= Rex Sterling =

Fictional character from the American CBS soap opera The Young and the Restless

- The Young and the Restless character
- Portrayed by: Quinn Redeker
- Duration: 1987–1994; 2004
- First appearance: July 2, 1987
- Last appearance: July 6, 2004
- Created by: William J. Bell
- Introduced by: Edward J. Scott (1987); William J. Bell, David Shaughnessy and John F. Smith (2004)
In-universe information
- Other names: Brian Romalotti
- Occupation: Businessman; Con artist
- Wife: Katherine Chancellor (1988–1990, 1992–1994); Jill Abbott (1990)
- Children: Gina Roma; Danny Romalotti
- Grandchildren: Daniel Romalotti (legal)

Rex Sterling is a fictional character from The Young and the Restless, an American soap opera on the CBS network. He was portrayed by Quinn Redeker from July 1987 to the character's exit in December 1994. He reprised the role in July 2004 for a one-episode guest appearance.

== Casting ==
Redeker signed on to portray Rex on The Young and the Restless just before departing his role of Alex Marshall on Days of Our Lives, where he last aired on July 23, 1987. Previously, he portrayed Nick Reed, the abusive father of Nikki Newman (Melody Thomas Scott), for five weeks in 1979. Redeker portrayed the role from July 1987 to the character's death in December 1994; prior to his exit, Redeker had been demoted to recurring status. A year prior to his exit, Redeker was vocal in his lack of screen time. The character and actor's exit left a large hole, with his co-star Jeanne Cooper (who played his widow Katherine Chancellor) stating: "When Rex died, I didn't want to go onto my set for two months. I was depressed for two months after he died." Redeker reprised the role on July 6, 2004, when he reappeared to an inebriated Katherine.

== Characterization ==
Rex evolved into a wealthy businessman.

== Storylines ==
When Jill Foster Abbott (Jess Walton) found Rex Sterling on a park bench and paid him to seduce her enemy Katherine Chancellor (Jeanne Cooper), she had no idea his real name was Brian Romalotti. He was the father of Danny Romalotti (Michael Damian) and Gina Roma (Patty Weaver), a con man that did time for the crimes he had committed with his wife. Rex did his job wonderfully and his relationship to Katherine suddenly turned into a romance. Kay found out the truth about Jill's job, but she didn't care. Rex even decided to sign a pre-nuptial agreement to prove to Kay that she should trust him.

Rex was stunned when Kay suddenly started to act strange and he couldn't take it anymore, so he decided to move out and move in with Jill, who then tried to make him divorce Kay and marry her. Rex had no idea that Kay was actually Marge Cotrooke (Jeanne Cooper), Kay's look-alike hired by his former cellmate Clint Radison (James Michael Gregary) to take over Kay's identity. During her tenure as Kay, Marge sold Chancellor industries and Clint was able to control Kay's assets, but not for long. Kay's son Brock and lawyer Mitchell were able to get rid of Clint in time.

Rex married Jill during Katherine's absence, but Kay was able to prove that their marriage wasn't legal because Marge had signed the divorce papers, not her. Rex and Jill were, however, apparently in love, so Kay decided to respect that. Jill found her way back into the arms of her former husband John Abbott (Jerry Douglas), while Rex got interested in Leanna Love (Barbara Crampton). Kay found out about their affair and revealed everything in a party she held. Rex and Kay eventually remarried while Rex was pretending to be dying from a heart attack. Their lives were perfect at that moment.

However, things changed when Kay's maid Esther Valentine (Kate Linder) started dating Norman Peterson (Mark Haining) and had no idea he was a con man. Kay and Rex agreed to go along with Esther's plan to pretend to be the owner of the mansion to impress Norman. Norman eventually found out and asked Esther to convince Kay to include her in her will. Rex and Kay found it strange when Norman proposed marriage to Esther, so they faked a wedding. Norman wasn't satisfied and he broke into the house safe only to be caught by Rex. In order to cover his tracks, Norman shot Rex to death.

In 2004, when Kay starts drinking excessively again, she passes out and dreams of Rex and Phillip Chancellor III (Thom Bierdz) encouraging her to stop drinking.
