= List of The Young and the Restless characters introduced in the 1980s =

This is a list of notable characters from the CBS soap opera The Young and the Restless that significantly impacted storylines and debuted between January 1980 and December 1989, in order of first appearance.

== Julia Newman ==
Julia Newman
- The Young and the Restless character
- Portrayed by: Meg Bennett
- Duration: 1980–1984, 1986–1987, 2002, 2018, 2020
- First appearance: February 8, 1980
- Last appearance: February 10, 2020
- Created by: William J. Bell
- Introduced by: William J. Bell and John Conboy (1980); Bell and H. Wesley Kenney (1986); Bell and David Shaughnessy (2002); Mal Young (2018)
In-universe information
- Occupation: Owner and Operator of Martin Designs
- Husband: Victor Newman (1970–81); Charles Martin (1984–85)
- Daughters: Jamie Martin

Julia Newman first appeared in February 1980 along with Victor Newman (Eric Braeden). She was portrayed by Meg Bennett until June 9, 1981, with reprise appearances in July 1982 and from October 13, 1982 to December 20, 1984, from September 9, 1986 to March 25, 1987, and also from March 1 to September 3, 2002. In February 2018, it was reported that Bennett would be returning as Julia to commemorate with the show's 45th anniversary. Bennet also returned in February 2020, to celebrate Braeden's 40th anniversary on the soap.

On June 13, 1970, Julia and businessman Victor Newman (Eric Braeden) were married. Ten years later, she and Victor moved to Genoa City so that he could help run Chancellor Industries for Katherine Chancellor (Jeanne Cooper). He was very protective of his wife, and kept her secluded at the ranch. Victor was so consumed by his work, he was barely there himself. Julia met and became friends with Katherine Chancellor's son, Brock Reynolds. Victor got jealous and had a one-night stand with his secretary, Eve Howard, in retaliation. Julia admitted she was falling in love with Brock, but they were not lovers, and she agreed to break it off if Victor fully committed to their marriage. Victor, however, was not convinced and turned to Lorie Brooks for attention. Brock caught Victor and Lorie kissing, so he tried to resume his romance with Julia, but he finally left town because of Julia's inability to end her marriage to Victor. Thinking it would convince Victor of her love for him, Julia told him that she wanted to have a baby. Victor responded by having a vasectomy without telling her.

When offered a job modeling for photographer Michael Scott (Nick Benedict) at his studio, Julia jumped at the chance. For once, Victor did not say no. Michael admired the dark-haired beauty, and they became close friends. While Victor was out of town, Eve suddenly resurfaced. Eve let Julia know that she was there to get Victor back. Feeling vulnerable and confused by Eve's presence, Julia slept with Michael. Julia was immediately overwhelmed with shame. Her friendship with Brock had remained strictly platonic but now that she had slept with Michael, Julia had actually cheated on Victor for the first time. When Julia began talking about her friend, Michael, Victor became jealous and began following them and taping their conversations. Then, Julia turned up pregnant.

Convinced the baby was Michael's, Victor kidnapped Michael and held him prisoner in the bomb shelter under the Newman Ranch. Victor had had it outfitted with cameras so he could observe and torture Michael by making him watch Victor and Julia making love. Victor fed Michael sparingly and taunted him often. Once, dinner even turned out to be a dead rat. Victor hired Paul Williams to feed Michael when he was out of town and told Paul that Michael was a mentally disabled relative who was not allowed out because he was violent and delusional. Eventually, when Julia discovered that Michael was being held hostage, she and Paul freed him. When Victor intervened, they had a struggle and Julia tumbled down a flight of stairs. Julia was rushed to the hospital where she miscarried, and Victor learned that he had, despite his vasectomy, fathered Julia's baby. Soon after, Julia and Michael both left town, but not together.

In 1982, Eve Howard ran into the now-divorced Julia in Paris and heard about Lorie Brooks abandoning Victor at the altar. She told Julia that she was involved with a wealthy count, Max Siebalt. Soon after, Eve went to Genoa City to be sure that Victor was going to continue to provide for their son, Cole Howard, and learned that Victor had put him in his will. Max and Eve began to scheme to get Victor's fortune, because Max was broke. Eve convinced Victor to hire her back as his personal assistant and, for a while, everything seemed fine. When Victor's manservant, Charlie, left, Eve offered to cook Victor's meals for him, lacing them with a slow-acting poison that, in small doses, could not be traced. Victor began to lose weight and appeared ill and, after Victor's dog ate some of his poisoned food and died, Victor became suspicious. Julia overheard part of their plan on the phone and warned Victor that he was in danger, but it was too late. Apparently not totally too late, though, because an antidote was found and Victor survived.

Julia proved that Eve was involved by having the poison analyzed. Victor realized that Eve had tried to poison him so that their son, Cole, could inherit half of his wealth. With the help of Julia and his friend, Douglas Austin, Victor began a scheme to trap Eve into confessing and even proposed to her which the greedy Eve quickly accepted. The day of Victor and Eve's wedding, she arrived at the Newman estate to learn that Victor had died. Eve arranged to have Victor's coffin placed in the Newman living room and took over as the grieving fiancée. Max, sensing that she was losing her grip on reality, quickly married her, since it appeared that Victor had left his estate to Eve. When Julia confided to Eve that she thought Victor was murdered and that she wanted to exhume his body for an autopsy, Eve sent Max to the graveyard to dig up the corpse. At the cemetery, Max was so shocked to see Victor alive that he fell against a pitchfork and died. Eve tried to stab Victor and was committed to a sanitarium.

A year later, Victor was marrying former stripper, Nikki Reed. Julia was at the ceremony and Eve Howard even escaped the sanitarium to try to stab Nikki. She failed, however. Around the same time, Julia tested another modeling career as Victor's enemy, Jack Abbott, hired Julia as Jabot Cosmetics' top model instead of his mistress, Diane Jenkins. At the same time, Julia had an affair with Ashley Abbott's fiancé, Eric Garrison. Julia ended up pregnant, but Eric never knew that Julia had given birth to his child. By 1985, Julia and her little girl, Jamie, left Genoa City and Julia ended up marrying Charles Martin. Jamie grew up assuming that Charles was her father, not Eric. During this time, Julia also built up a major interior design firm, Martin Designs, in Lake Forest, Illinois.

In March 2002, a newspaper article alerted Victor that a hostile takeover was threatening Julia's Martin Designs, so he dropped everything to go to Lake Forest. Julia was happy and surprised to see him. He told her that she looked wonderful and that he knew about the takeover bid, then offered to help. After some reminiscing, Julia told him how she and her late husband, Charles, had created their successful design business together and said that she did not think Victor was the kind of person that could work side-by-side with his wife in business. She joked that he was not as controlling as when they were married, but she was young and he was older and set in his ways. She asked about his kids and his love life and was pleased that he was dating Nikki again, whom she liked. Julia told him about her daughter, Jamie, who was in college.

They met with Maxwell Hollister who refused Victor's offer to buy all the stock in Julia's company, even at ten percent over the value. Before Hollister could leave, Victor promised to create a similar design division at Newman Enterprises, put Julia in charge of it, attack Hollister's company at its weak spots and run him out of business. Thwarted, Hollister signed Victor's purchase agreement and left. Julia thanked Victor for saving the company that meant so much to her. After a few more reminisces, Victor asked her what she thought of their time together when she looked back. She said that he was domineering and always in control of any relationship that he entered. They hugged and even kissed then said goodbye. She seemed sad to see him leave. An angry Max tracked down Leanna Love. He told her he would read Ruthless and knew she was once married to Victor, then told her how Victor humiliated him and that he wanted revenge. Leanna explained that Victor's actions for Martin Designs was much more than business, explaining that Julia was Victor's first wife. Max agreed to do Leanna's TV show and give her the scoop on Julia and Victor, in exchange for some recent photos her photographer shot of Victor and Ramona Caceres.

Nikki Newman saw the show and was upset that Victor had visited both Ramona and Julia without telling her. Soon, Max approached Nikki and suggested she join him against Victor. Victor tried to explain to Nikki his soul-searching visits to Julia and Ramona, as well as Hope Wilson. He said that he did not want to repeat his mistakes of the past and proposed to Nikki with an engagement ring. Nikki was also reluctant to try again and said she would give him an answer when she returned to town in two weeks. Max went to Victor and let him know that he was courting Nikki for revenge. Victor ended up telephoning Hope, Julia, and Ramona. They convinced Leanna to do a retraction of the story. When Nikki returned, she accepted Victor's proposal. Then, Lorie Brooks showed up in town looking for Max to sign their divorce papers. When Max found out that Lorie was once a love of Victor's, he tried to get her to join him in his revenge. She ended up agreeing, but their scheme (which involved Lorie's seduction of Victor while Nikki watched on videotape) fell apart as Lorie ended up falling for Victor and could not follow through on the scheme. Victor and Nikki ended up remarrying in September 2002.

== Mary Williams ==
Mary Williams
- The Young and the Restless character
- Portrayed by: Carolyn Conwell
- Duration: 1980–2004
- First appearance: March 17, 1980
- Last appearance: May 10, 2004
- Introduced by: William J. Bell
In-universe information
- Family: Williams
- Siblings: Jane
- Husband: Carl Williams (1953–98)
- Children: Paul Williams; Patty Williams; Todd Williams; Steven Williams
- Grandchildren: Heather Stevens; Ricky Williams; Dylan McAvoy

Mary Williams first appeared in March 1980 as the Williams family matriarch. She was portrayed by actress Carolyn Conwell until May 10, 2004. Beginning and ending as a series regular, Conwell had been bumped back and forth between contract and recurring.

Mary was the wife of officer Carl Williams and the mother of Patty, Paul, Steven and Father Todd Williams. She also has a late sister named Jane. Mary was first introduced as the understanding mother of four children. She was front-burner early in her run when her character had a sudden late life pregnancy yet ended up miscarrying the child. Mary spent much time either volunteering at her Catholic church or fretting over her children, especially troubled Patty who was involved with the wealthy playboy Jack, and the rebellious Paul who went through a brief teen marriage which produced a daughter. Mary became worried in 1982 when Carl was all of a sudden fired from the police thanks to Pete Walker, a mob boss determined to keep Carl's nose out of his business. Thanks to Paul, Carl was cleared, but not before Mary was held hostage by Walker's men. Carl and Mary were horrified when it was revealed that their good friend Alex Morgan was on the mob payroll and had Carl fired. Pete and Alex would kill each other in a shoot-out. Later, Mary and Carl were devastated by the death of Paul's new girlfriend Cindy Lake, a former prostitute trying to make a go of it. It was ironically around this time when daughter Patty found Jack having an affair with Diane Jenkins and shot him, afterwards forgetting what she had done.

Sometime after this, Mary underwent a personality transformation, becoming more demanding and nosy and trying to push Paul into relationships with women he did not love. Mary could not stand Paul's new girlfriend, wealthy Lauren Fenmore whom she found too uppity for the likes of her son. Carl tried to make his wife see that her sudden meddling ways would harm her relationship with her children rather than help it, but Mary would not budge. When Lauren submitted a nude photo of Paul as part of a centerfold, Mary took "I told you so" to a new level.

In the late 1980s, Carl went missing and was presumed dead, devastating Mary and her children. Paul, having become a private detective, desperately tried to locate Carl, but to no avail. Ten years later, after Mary had accepted a marriage proposal from Charlie Ottwell, Paul's wife Christine was shocked to discover that Carl was still alive, and living in Norfolk under the name Jim Bradley. It was revealed that he had been captured by criminals while working on a police case, and was beaten and left for dead. An amnesiac Carl had been found and rescued by a woman named Ruth Perkins. Christine convinced "Jim" to return to Genoa City with her. Mary was shocked when Carl returned, and eventually broke off her engagement with Charlie. However, Carl never regained his memory or reconnected with his family, and he went back to Norfolk with Ruth.

Paul and Christine divorced, and Mary became intent on breaking up Paul's latest marriage, to Isabella Braña, of whom Mary did not approve. She enlisted Christine's help in breaking up the marriage, but Christine was unable to convince Paul to leave Isabella. Despite the fact that Isabella had given Mary the grandchild that she had always wanted, a boy who was named Ricardo Carl Williams, Ricardo went to live with Isabella's parents in California. Mary has not been seen on-screen since 2004 after a sudden drunk driving charge was made against her after an argument with Paul. In 2009, a "slowing down" Mary returned (off-screen) with her eldest son, Father Todd Williams, for Paul's nuptials to Nikki Newman. As of 2014, Paul revealed to Nikki that Mary had died.

In 2024, Charlie Mason from Soaps She Knows included Mary in his list of the best mothers in American soap operas, writing, "She never did manage to set up son Paul with that nice Lynne Bassett. But it was not for lack of trying on the buttinsky's part. And heaven knows, none of Mary's kids ever wanted for spare ribs and sauerkraut!"

== Eve Howard ==
Eve Howard
- The Young and the Restless character
- Portrayed by: Margaret Mason
- Duration: 1980–84; 1993
- First appearance: September 3, 1980
- Last appearance: December 9, 1993
- Introduced by: William J. Bell
In-universe information
- Other names: Eve Siebalt
- Occupation: Personal assistant
- Siblings: Jordan Howard
- Husband: Max Siebalt (1982–83)
- Sons: Cole Howard
- Granddaughters: Claire Newman

Eve Howard first appeared on September 3, 1980 as an assistant to Victor Newman (Eric Braeden), whom she had earlier had a brief fling with. She was also the mother of Cole Howard (J. Eddie Peck). She was portrayed by actress Margaret Mason from September 3, 1980 to September 10, 1981, and again from October 13, 1982 to June 29, 1983. Mason later reprised the role from April 6, 1984 to April 16, 1984 and from July 27, 1984 to August 15, 1984. Mason later appeared nearly ten years later from February 4, 1993 to December 9, 1993.

Originally a resident of Washington, in the 1970s, Eve lived in Chicago and worked as an assistant to businessman Victor Newman at Newman Enterprises. Victor's wife, Julia Newman, felt lonely as Victor worked for hours on end away from their home. Julia and Victor moved to Genoa City in early 1980. Earlier, Julia ended up becoming close friends with Katherine Chancellor's son, Brock Reynolds. Although Julia and Brock were never lovers, Victor had felt jealous, and he slept with Eve in retaliation. Eve, who had feelings for Victor, was saddened when he informed her that it was only a one-night stand. When Eve ran into Julia during her first visit to Genoa City, she told her that she wanted Victor. However, Victor was out of town at the time. Julia, nonetheless, was frightened of the possibility of losing Victor, noting his recent affair with Lorie Brooks. Eve also accepted Jill Foster's offer to move in with her son to the old Foster home. Julia ended up having an affair with her photography instructor, Michael Scott. When Victor returned, Eve made several attempts to woo him, but he ended up making a deal with Eve for her to leave town. The deal allowed Eve to leave town and work with one of his other companies and Victor would accept that Eve's son, Cole, was his son and therefore provide for him. Eve accepted his offer and left again. With Eve gone, Victor ended up imprisoning Michael Scott in the Newman Ranch basement once he learned that Julia was pregnant. Julia ended up discovering this and she rescued Michael, but she suffered a miscarriage in the process.

In 1982, Eve ran into the now divorced Julia in Paris and she heard about Lorie Brooks abandoning Victor at the altar. She told Julia that she was involved with a wealthy count, Max Siebalt. Soon after, Eve went to Genoa City to be sure that Victor was going to continue to provide for their son, Cole Howard, and she learned that Victor had put him in his will. During this time, Victor was having an affair with former stripper, Nikki Reed. Max and Eve began to scheme to get Victor's fortune because Max was broke. Eve convinced Victor to hire her back as his personal assistant. When Victor's manservant, Charlie, left, Eve offered to cook Victor's meals for him, lacing them with a slow-acting poison that, in small doses, could not be traced. Victor began to lose weight and appeared ill, but after his dog ate some of his poisoned food and died, Victor became suspicious. Julia overheard part of their plan on the phone, and she warned Victor that he was in danger, but it was too late. Soon after, an antidote was found, and Victor survived.

Julia proved that Eve was involved in the plot against Victor by having the poison analyzed. Victor realized that Eve had tried to poison him so that their son, Cole, could inherit half of his wealth. With the help of Julia and his friend, Douglas Austin, Victor began a scheme to trap Eve into confessing, and he even proposed to her, which the greedy Eve quickly accepted. The day of Victor and Eve's wedding, she arrived at the Newman estate to learn that Victor had died and Eve began to have psychotic lapses, at one moment mourning, the next minute celebrating. Eve arranged to have Victor's coffin placed in the Newman living room, and she took over as the grieving fiancée. Max, sensing that she was losing her grip on reality, quickly married her, since it appeared that Victor had left his estate to Eve. When Julia confided to Eve that she thought Victor was murdered, and that she wanted to exhume his body for an autopsy, Eve sent Max to the graveyard to dig up the corpse. At the cemetery, Max was so shocked to see Victor alive that he fell against a pitchfork and died. Eve tried to stab Victor, and she was consequently committed to a sanitarium.

By 1984, Victor was planning on marrying Nikki. When Eve read about this in the newspaper at the sanitarium, she tried to switch places with her roommate, who was about to be released but wanted to stay in the sanitarium. Eve knocked out a caterer and changed clothes with her to get into the hotel where Victor and Nikki were being married. After the wedding, Eve went to Nikki's room, and she prepared to stab her, but she was interrupted by Nikki's sister, Dr. Casey Reed. So, Eve climbed into Victor's trunk which was about to be placed on the plane for his honeymoon. At the last moment, the newlyweds changed their minds and decided to stay home. Victor learned that Eve had escaped; he found her and returned her to the sanitarium. A couple of months later, while Victor and Nikki were vacationing, Eve and Nikki's former lover, Rick Daros, escaped from the sanitarium and returned to Genoa City. Rick had amnesia, forgetting he had tried to kill Nikki earlier in the year, and he became Eve's lover. After breaking into the ranch, Eve stole money from Victor's safe, and the two escaped to Europe.

Ten years went by without a mention of Eve or her son, then she showed up in 1993, looking as glamorous as ever. Her past crimes totally overlooked; Victor simply fondly recalled her working for him years before and recalled that they had shared some "good times". When Eve brought up Cole, whom she still claimed was Victor's, Victor wanted nothing to do with him. Eve left in a huff, slipping Cole's picture into Victor's book. Some time afterward, a lonely Victor contacted Eve and asked her to bring Cole to Genoa City. Eve returned to Genoa City with Cole, a young and handsome aspiring novelist. Cole built up a relationship in Genoa City with Victor's daughter with Nikki, Victoria Newman, while Eve left. She would periodically visit or call him to see how he was doing in his new life. Soon after, Cole wrote to his mother saying he had fallen for Victoria. Eve, while on a cruise, read the letter and was horrified by the thought of her son unknowingly becoming involved with his half-sister. She arranged to leave the ship, and she flew to Genoa City. While on the plane, she became ill from being bitten by a mosquito.

Upon arrival to Genoa City, she was rushed to the hospital, and Cole was notified of his mother's condition. Eve lingered for weeks, in and out of a coma, and, while somewhat lucid, tried and failed to tell Cole that Victor was his father. Not long after Eve's funeral, Cole and Victoria Newman eloped in Las Vegas. Luckily, Eve was wrong. While going through Eve's belongings, Victor discovered a letter from another man to her which cast doubt on Victor being Cole's father. Victor immediately arranged to have blood tests run on Cole, himself and Eve's corpse. The father ended up being Eve's former lover, Marvin Oakley, who resented Victor for Eve's obsession but still felt that Eve had been a wonderful woman who could have loved him had Victor not been around. Four years later, while Cole and Victoria's baby struggled for her life, Victoria told Cole she wanted to name her Eve, after his mother. Soon after, Victoria learned from Cole that their baby had died.

In 2023, Curtis Harding from Soaps She Knows called the character "obsessive" and wrote that, due to Cole being the son of her and "psychotic Rick Daros", it " you'd have expected Cole to turn out a bad seed himself".

It was later revealed that Eve's estranged sister Jordan Howard, who worked as a traveling nurse on the day that Cole and Victoria's daughter was born. Jordan, who was angry at Cole and the Newmans after the death of her sister decided to steal baby Eve and switch her with another baby who died the same day to punish the family, and raised her by naming her, "Claire Grace", while telling her that Cole and Victoria did not want her and begin their revenge scheme against the Newmans.

== Andy Richards ==
Andy Richards
- The Young and the Restless character
- Portrayed by: Steven Ford
- Duration: 1981–87; 2002–03
- First appearance: June 18, 1981
- Last appearance: May 9, 2003
- Introduced by: William J. Bell
In-universe information
- Occupation: Partner in Williams Investigations; Bartender at The Bayou
- Wife: Diane Jenkins (1984–86); Farren Connor (1986–2001)

Andy Richards first appeared on June 18, 1981, and later became a love interest for Diane Jenkins (Alex Donnelley) and Farren Connor (Colleen Casey). He was portrayed by Steven Ford until December 2, 1987. However, Ford reprised his role from October 29, 2002, to May 9, 2003.

In the 1980s, Andy worked as a partner in the Paul Williams Detective Agency, and originally dated Nikki Reed. In 1982, Andy, estranged from his alcoholic wife Karen, began seeing Jill Foster. Jill liked Andy, but was not content with the wages that he earned. She attempted to convince him to take a higher-paying job, and he eventually proposed marriage to her. After Karen finally promised him a divorce, Jill reluctantly agreed to marry Andy, but was horrified to learn that his plan was for them to move into his mother's old house to save on expenses. Andy broke off their engagement when Jill became close to Jabot Cosmetics tycoon John Abbott. In 1984, Andy began dating Diane Jenkins. They fell in love, and married later that year. However, they divorced two years later. Andy then set his sights on mysterious singer Farren Connor. The two became close, but Andy's friend Lauren Fenmore was suspicious of Farren, who eventually confided in Andy that she had severe amnesia and could not remember anything about her past or identity. A concerned Lauren convinced a wary Diane to reconcile with her ex-husband to keep him away from Farren, but Andy wanted only a friendship with Diane. Instead, Andy married Farren, and Lauren reluctantly gave the couple her blessing.

Determined to find out about Farren's past, Lauren put a personal ad in the newspaper. A man named Evan Sanderson answered the ad and revealed that Farren was really his missing wife, Michelle, and the mother of their daughter, Betsy. Farren did not remember her husband or her daughter. After Evan had accepted his wife's amnesia as permanent and prepared to return home to Pittsburgh, Farren's memory suddenly returned. Farren reconnected with Evan and Betsy, but Evan was shot dead by his jealous housekeeper and former lover, Janet. Andy decided to marry Farren and move to Pittsburgh to be a family with Betsy. Fifteen years later, Andy returned to Genoa City alone, and decided to go back to work as a detective with Paul Williams at his agency. He revealed that he and Farren had divorced a year prior to his return. Andy and Diane also briefly rekindled their romance, however, after six months, Andy left Genoa City once again.

== Mamie Johnson ==
Mamie Johnson
- Young and the Restless character
- Portrayed by: Marguerite Ray (1982–1990); Veronica Redd (1990–2024)
- Duration: 1982–1995; 1999–2004; 2023–2024
- First appearance: April 1, 1982
- Last appearance: June 25, 2024
- Created by: William J. Bell
In-universe information
- Occupation: Owner of LBB Financial; Housekeeper; Nanny
- Sisters: Lillie Belle Barber
- Nieces: Olivia Barber; Drucilla Barber
- Other relatives: Devon Hamilton (adoptive); Lily Winters; Nate Hastings

Mamie Johnson is a fictional character on the CBS soap opera, The Young and the Restless. The role originated on April 1, 1982, being portrayed by Marguerite Ray, who was replaced on May 16, 1990, by Veronica Redd. Redd departed the series on September 28, 1995, but returned from April 22, 1999, to September 14, 2004, and again in 2023. Mamie was the series' first regular African American character.

Mamie was introduced in 1982 as the Abbott family's loyal housekeeper. She served as the nanny to the three Abbott children, Jack, Ashley, Traci, when they were growing up after patriarch John Abbott separated from his first wife Dina. Along with the three Abbott children, Mamie disapproved of John's 1982 marriage to Jill Foster, and tried to keep a sharp eye on his second wife until they divorced in 1986. Mamie also provided support to the Abbott family during John's brief 1988-89 marriage to the AIDS-stricken Jessica Blair Grainger, and when John had a heart attack after learning that Victor Newman had taken over the Abbott's Jabot Cosmetics in 1989.

Mamie remained a supporting character to the Abbott family until the 1990 introduction of her nieces Drucilla and Olivia Barber. Drucilla had run away from her home as a teenager and suddenly showed up at Mamie's door. Mamie convinced John to let Drucilla stay with her in the servants quarters for the time being, while Olivia came into town to work as a doctor at Genoa City Memorial Hospital. Mamie then provided support to her nieces, as Drucilla worked her way up from the Jabot mailroom to fashion model. As the show progressed, Drucilla married Neil Winters and Olivia married Nathan Hastings, Olivia is diagnosed with ovarian cancer, and Drucilla confronted her mother Lillie Belle who admitted to her daughter that she was an unwanted child.

Mamie disapproved of John remarrying Jill in 1993, but she gave her support when Jill gave birth to Billy Abbott later that year. John and Jill's second marriage also ended up in divorce in 1996; the bitter custody battle over Billy caused John to suffer another stroke. While John was recuperating, Mamie admitted that she was in love with him. John reciprocated her feelings, but later lapsed into a coma. When he recovered, John devastated Mamie by rebuking those feelings for Billy's sake. Mamie then accepted Jill's payout of one million of dollars and left town to travel the world.

She periodically returned between 1999 and 2004, providing help when needed. Mamie returns in 2023, to help celebrate Genoa City's Bicentennial.

In September 2023, Mamie returned to Genoa City and was revealed to be Chancellor-Winters’ mystery investor. Having relocated to Detroit, Michigan a few years back after purchasing Walter and Lillie Bell’s home, Mamie founded a small investment firm named after her sister, LBB.

== Gina Roma ==
Gina Roma
- The Young and the Restless character
- Portrayed by: Patty Weaver
- Duration: 1982–2009; 2013; 2023; 2025
- First appearance: October 14, 1982
- Last appearance: November 24, 2025
- Created by: William J. Bell
- Introduced by: H. Wesley Kenney (1982); Jill Farren Phelps (2013); Anthony Morina and Josh Griffith (2023); Anthony Morina and Sally McDonald (2025)
In-universe information
- Occupation: Restaurant manager
- Father: Rex Sterling
- Brothers: Danny Romalotti
- Husband: Clint Radison (1989–94)
- Nephews: Daniel Romalotti (legal)

Gina Roma is a fictional character from the CBS soap opera, The Young and the Restless, portrayed by Patty Weaver.

The role was portrayed by Patty Weaver throughout her entire run on The Young and the Restless. Weaver appeared from October 1982 through 2005 when she was taken off contract, remaining on recurring until 2009. She made a guest visit for Katherine Chancellor's funeral in September 2013.

Gina is the sister of Danny Romalotti and uses the shortened last name "Roma". She first appeared in 1982 wanting to help her brother. Danny at first did not trust her but eventually warmed up to his sister and helped arrange to get her a job singing at one of the town's popular gathering spots, Jonas' Restaurant (formerly known as Pierre's during The Young and the Restless's debut on 1973). She eventually bought the restaurant after Jonas put it up for sale, renaming it Gina's. As a result, she got to know many of the town's residents who frequented the place.

In 1987, Danny and Gina's father, Brian Romalotti turned up in town, a homeless drifter just out of prison. He was molded and renamed by Jill Foster Abbott as "Rex Sterling" in order to con Katherine Chancellor. Rex and Kay ended up falling in love, and he became a "good guy". Danny, Gina and Rex then became very close.

Rex's former cellmate Clint Radison showed up in town in 1989. He found out that Gina was Rex's daughter, so he developed a plot to seduce her, and eventually married her. Clint also hired Marge Cotrooke, a diner waitress who was also a look-alike of Kay, to impersonate her. His plan was foiled when Kay's son Brock Reynolds and lawyer Mitchell Sherman revealed their plot. Clint went to prison after Marge decided to help Kay. Clint escaped a few months later and Kay nearly attacked him when he showed up on her doorstep, but she was stopped by Gina who declared she still had feelings for Clint. Realizing Kay was upset over her encounter with Clint, Brock decided to talk some sense into Gina. Ignoring Gina's plea to give Clint another chance, however, Brock planned to turn him in. While Gina was begging Clint not to turn himself in, Brock was attacked by an armed robber. Clint arrived on the scene, but it was too late to stop the robber from shooting Brock. Although Clint wanted to help Brock, Clint decided to make a run for it. Kay later assumed Clint was responsible for Brock's shooting. However, Clint managed to call for help for Brock and Brock was rushed to the hospital. Rex was shocked by Kay's admission that Clint saved Brock's life. Later, Rex arrived at Gina's, demanding that she tell him where Clint was. Coming out of hiding, Clint told Rex he never intended to hurt Gina. Gina was mortified when Clint admitted he called the police. Clint was returned to prison.

After Gina's Restaurant burned down in 2003 due to arson, she decided against rebuilding it and instead worked as the manager of the Athletic Club.

Gina left town in 2009, but returned for Katherine's funeral in 2013, and the Genoa City bicentennial in 2023, to commemorate the show’s 50th anniversary. She returned again in 2025 for Danny's wedding to Christine Blair.

== Neil Fenmore ==
Neil Fenmore
- The Young and the Restless character
- Portrayed by: Jim Storm
- Duration: 1983–85
- First appearance: October 13, 1983
- Last appearance: September 16, 1985
- Introduced by: William J. Bell
In-universe information
- Occupation: CEO of Fenmore's Boutiques
- Wife: Joanna Manning (1959–83)
- Daughters: Jill Abbott; Lauren Fenmore
- Grandsons: Phillip Chancellor III; Billy Abbott; Scotty Grainger; Dylan Fenmore (legal); Fenmore Baldwin

Neil Fenmore first appeared October 13, 1983, and was portrayed by Jim Storm. The character of Neil was the father of Lauren Fenmore (Tracey E. Bregman), and years later revealed to be the father of Jill Abbott (Jess Walton). Neil was also the ex-husband of Joanna Manning (Susan Seaforth Hayes). Storm departed from the role September 16, 1985, but Neil's fate was not addressed until 1987 when Neil died of a stroke making Lauren his sole heir.

Neil Fenmore was the father of two daughters: Jill and Lauren. Neil Fenmore came from a wealthy family. He went to high school with Gary Reynolds, Katherine Chancellor, John Abbott, Dina Mergeron, Joanna Manning, Stuart Brooks, and Suzanne Lynch. Most of those early friendships lasted throughout the years. When Neil was a teenager, his girlfriend had a baby girl, gave her up for adoption and then committed suicide. That baby turned out to be Jill Foster Abbott. He ran the department store chain Fenmore's Boutiques and had raised another daughter, Lauren Fenmore, on his own after his wife, Joanna Manning, left town. Neil and Lauren were fairly close. However, he died of a stroke in 1986. Lauren was the sole heir to the department store chain.

After learning that Neil was her father, Jill made Fenmore a part of her last name. She then sued Lauren for half of Neil's estate. Jill was at Neil's gravesite being interviewed for television. Lauren appeared and said she was there to make sure they got the real story. Lauren said Jill did not give her time to adjust before she went on the attack. Jill said she was not on the attack; she wanted to be part of the family but Lauren would not even show her photographs of Neil. Lauren reminded her about her lawsuit and threatened to get a restraining order. Jill claimed all she cared about was being part of the family. Lauren knocked her down into an empty grave and asked if she felt closer to Daddy now. However, despite all these events, Jill and Lauren reconciled and remain close to date.

== Dina Abbott Mergeron ==
Dina Abbott Mergeron
- The Young and the Restless character
- Portrayed by: Marla Adams (1983–2020); Cathy Marks (2018)
- Duration: 1983–1986; 1991; 1996; 2008; 2017–2020
- First appearance: April 22, 1983
- Last appearance: October 16, 2020
- Introduced by: William J. Bell and H. Wesley Kenney (1983); Bell and Edward J. Scott (1991, 1996); Maria Arena Bell and Paul Rauch (2008); Mal Young and Sally Sussman Morina (2017)
In-universe information
- Other names: Phyllis Palmer "Madame Mergeron"
- Occupation: Businesswoman; Socialite
- Husband: John Abbott (1950–72); Marcel Mergeron
- Children: Eric Vanderway; Jack Abbott; Ashley Abbott; Traci Abbott
- Stepsons: Marc Mergeron
- Grandchildren: Theo Vanderway; Keemo Volien Abbott; John Abbott III; Kyle Abbott; Abby Newman; Colleen Carlton
- Other relatives: Allie Nguyen; Harrison Locke

Dina Abbott Mergeron first appeared on April 22, 1983, as the ex-wife of John Abbott (Jerry Douglas) and the mother of Jack, Ashley, and Traci Abbott. The role is portrayed by Marla Adams. From April 22, 1983 to July 16, 1986, Adams appeared as a series regular (she was dropped to recurring in late 1985) with return appearances in 1991 and 1996. In 2008, Adams reprised the role from November 14 to 18, 2008, and again starting on May 3, 2017. In October 2020, it was announced that she would exit the role.

Dina is the first wife of Jabot founder, John Abbott. She is the mother of Jack, Ashley, and Traci Abbott. Dina came from a professional upper-class society family of Genoa City. She was very close with Katherine Chancellor; a prime example came when they were having tea at the Chancellor Estate and remembered the day Dina and John asked Katherine to be Ashley's godmother a few days after she was born. It was revealed that it was Katherine who gave Ashley the middle name of Suzanne as a tribute to a former close friend of theirs in high school who had died because she was such a "beauty".

It had also been comically noted over the years that Dina, John, Katherine, Joanna Manning, Neil Fenmore, Stuart Brooks, and Gary Reynolds had gone to the same high school and developed a strong friendship beyond those years. Dina left John to raise their children on his own. Thanks to his housekeeper, Mamie Johnson, he had the help he needed. In 1983, Dina was now the widow of a wealthy cosmetics baron, Marcel Mergeron. She came to Genoa City as the mysterious "Madame Mergeron", shocking the Abbott family when her identity was revealed. As the head of her own cosmetics firm, she tried unsuccessfully to buy Jabot Cosmetics. When she was in town, the secret also came out that Ashley was not John's daughter. Dina was at Jack's side after he was shot by his first wife, Patty Williams.

When Ashley accepted Parisian painter Eric Garrison's marriage proposal, his belongings arrived from Paris. Ashley found among them a painting of her estranged mother which was signed, "All My Love, Eric". Ashley soon broke it off with Eric and fell in love with Marc Mergeron, who turned out to be Dina's stepson from Marcel. Soon, former Genoa City Country Club tennis pro Brent Davis returned to town and began an affair with Katherine Chancellor. When he found out that he was dying, Brent wanted to reveal that he had been Dina's lover and was Ashley's biological father. Dina and Kay tried to talk him out of it, but Ashley was traumatized by the news when he told her, and she ended up losing her memory at a roadside diner, where she took the name "Annie" and worked as a waitress. When Brent and Kay returned from a vacation together, Dina confronted Brent about what he had done. Dina shot Brent but missed, and Kay was shot instead. Jack figured out what had happened, and he and his flame at the time, Jill Abbott, confronted Dina. Dina and John began a search for Ashley. A truck driver saw one of their fliers, figured out who "Annie" really was and offered her whereabouts to John for ransom. Victor Newman ended up finding her at the diner and took her home to recuperate with him and his wife, Nikki Newman, at the Newman Ranch. Ashley forgave Brent just before his death, and she vowed that John Abbott would never find out. At the time, only Ashley, Dina, Jack, Jill, Katherine, and Victor knew of Ashley's real parentage. Dina faded out of the story with the assumption that she had returned to Paris after being jealous of John's newfound friendship with Joanna Manning.

When Traci remarries Brad Carlton in 1991, Dina surprised everybody by showing up and, once again, John became entranced by her classiness and sophistication. While Jack was overjoyed by her return, Ashley and Traci both have resentments towards their mother for her absence. John, lonely after his divorce from Jill, quickly proposed, and Dina accepted. But Jill was suspicious and hired Paul Williams to investigate Dina's whereabouts. It turned out that Dina was broke after a series of bad affairs with wealthy lovers and Jill insisted that Dina was only after John's money. Dina insisted that this was not the case but John refused to believe otherwise. Dina bid farewell to her children once again and departed for parts unknown.

In 1996, at Katherine's request, a wiser (yet sadder) Dina reappeared in Genoa City, still beautiful but determined to make up for past mistakes. Dina learned that John's former secretary, Audrey North, had lied years before about having had an affair with John which caused Dina to leave him in the first place. John resumed his romance with Dina and again proposed. Although Jack was elated that his parents were involved again, Ashley and Traci were opposed. The stress John suffered while dealing with Jill, whom he had remarried, caused him to have a stroke. However, he quickly recovered. Jill and John finally agreed to divorce, and Jill made plans to live in a new home with her son, Billy. Dina surprised her family by suddenly leaving town again, suffering guilt from the hurt she had caused her family.

Dina made infrequent visits but, for the most part, remained in Paris, running Mergeron Cosmetics. She was mentioned when an imprisoned John mistook his last wife, Gloria Bardwell, as Dina whom Jack had him "disown" from his will. In 2006, Dina and Mamie sent flowers to remember John, as they both were unable to attend his funeral. In 2008, Dina returned to Genoa City for Katherine's funeral, when in reality her look-alike, Marge Cotrooke, was the one who died. She got a chance to meet Jack's wife at the time, Sharon Abbott, and get reacquainted with her children. After the funeral, Dina left to attend a charity drive in Palm Springs. In 2009, Dina also sent flowers for her granddaughter Colleen's funeral, as she was unable to attend because she was on a cruise.

In 2017, Dina decides to sell her company and meets with Devon Hamilton and Neil Winters, who are looking to buy it. Neil's experience as an executive does not impress Dina but Devon's connection to Katherine Chancellor does because he is her grandson. Ashley, still holding resentment towards her mother, hosts an Abbott family dinner. Tracy comes in from New York on her way to a book signing and is thrilled to see her mother after all these years. Ashley still wonders if something is up with her mother's visit but cannot put her finger on it. The dinner goes well and the night ends with the family taking a selfie. Graham, Dina's companion, seems to be controlling of Dina and it begins to bother Jack and Ashley. Abby Newman, Ashley's daughter, finally gets to meet her grandmother and confesses that she called her days ago saying she was from Newman (just to hear her voice) but instead Dina (not knowing who she is) tells her that she can tell Victor that under no circumstances will she sell her company to him and hangs up. Dina's personality has changed over the years and Ashley begins to think something is up with Graham and confronts him before they fly back to Paris and implies that he is after her mother's money. He is appalled by the accusation and assures her he is not after her money. Ashley visits her mother in her hotel room one last time before she leaves to convince her to stay but Dina says she is leaving. Just as Ashley walks out the door, Dina tells her to tell Abby goodbye for her. This sets Ashley off and she tells her that she does not have the decency to tell her granddaughter goodbye herself and is walking out of her life just like she did with her kids long ago. Abby finds out through Jack that Dina is going back to Paris and is bothered that she did not say goodbye. She heads over to the Athletic Club and sees her before she leaves and ask her to stay, but Dina says no, however she later reconsiders out of her love for Abby.

In October 2017, Dina accidentally reveals Ashley's true paternity, has a mini-stroke, and is flown to Florida by her companion Graham – who is revealed to be Brent Davis's stepson, who was only after Dina for her money, after feeling abandoned by Brent. Jack and Ashley find her, and take her to Genoa City. Dina (in the mid stages of Alzheimer's disease) accidentally burns down Nicholas Newman's bar. Dina then confesses to having Alzheimer's to her family on Thanksgiving, causing them all to gather for her sake. Dina has frequent memory losses and mood swings. In January 2018, Dina temporarily moves to Paris with Abby.

In March 2018, Dina gets lost in Paris, which causes distress for Jack and Ashley. Dina is found, and Jack decides to bring Dina home. Abby attempts to make a memoir of Dina and starts videotaping her, to try to capture Dina's moments of clarity and rashness. In one of these video recordings, Dina, reveals that Jack is not John Abbott's son, later incorrectly identifying Phillip Chancellor for Jack's father. However, that October, it is revealed that Jack is in fact John Abbott's son, as it was all a ruse created by Ashley to gain control at Jabot. Over the holidays, Dina's memory remains scattered, but she does manage to share a pleasant Christmas with Jack, especially one where she stayed at home with him while his father worked rather than meeting friends at the country club. In May 2019, Dina enters a care facility in Genoa City. On October 16, 2020, Dina dies.

In 2024, Charlie Mason from Soaps She Knows included Dina in his list of the worst mothers in American soap operas, writing, "Oh, we know, we know—she and her kids kissed and made up in the end. But there wouldn't have been so many hard feelings to soften if Dina hadn't been a more glamorous than nurturing mom to begin with."

== Skip and Carol Evans ==
Skip and Carol Evans
- The Young and the Restless character
- Portrayed by: Todd Curtis (Skip); Christopher Templeton (Carol)
- Duration: 1983–1993
- First appearance: May 26, 1983
- Last appearance: 1993
- Introduced by: William J. Bell
In-universe information
- Occupation: Photographer (Skip); Secretary (Carol)
- Spouse: Married 1989
- Daughters: Skylar Evans (adoptive)

Carol Robbins Evans and Skip Evans became a couple while working at Jabot Cosmetics. They were portrayed by actress Christopher Templeton from May 26, 1983, to 1993 and actor Todd Curtis from March 10, 1987, to June 7, 1990. Templeton's real-life disability was incorporated into her character.

Carol worked as one of Jabot's executive secretaries, mostly for Jack Abbott. Meanwhile, Skip Evans served as the company's photographer, replacing Joe Blair, who was Christine Blair's cousin. After falling in love, the couple married in 1989 with the support of the Abbotts. Carol survived a childhood illness that left her leg permanently disabled. The illness also prevented her from conceiving a baby, and adoption agencies refused to let them adopt. Carol and Skip then came into contact with a young, unwed pregnant mother, Nancy "Nan" Nolan, who was unsure whether the father of her baby was her boyfriend or the result of a rape. She planned on giving her baby to Carol and Skip after the birth. After her baby was born, Nan discovered that the father was indeed her boyfriend and had second thoughts about giving up her baby to the Skip and Carol. Eventually, she let Skip and Carol adopt her baby after realizing that she was unprepared for the responsibilities of raising a child. Eventually, Carol and Skip left Genoa City with their adoptive daughter, Skylar Evans.

== Matt Miller ==
Matt Miller
- The Young and the Restless character
- Portrayed by: Robert Parucha (1985–1987, 2003, 2020); Richard Gleason (2018)
- Duration: 1985–1987; 2003; 2018; 2020
- First appearance: May 1, 1985
- Last appearance: February 19, 2020
- Created by: William J. Bell
- Introduced by: H. Wesley Kenney (1983); David Shaughnessy and John F. Smith (2003); Mal Young (2018); Anthony Morina and Josh Griffith (2020)
In-universe information
- Family: Newman
- Parents: Albert Miller; Cora Miller
- Brothers: Victor Newman
- Nieces and nephews: Victoria Newman; Nicholas Newman; Adam Newman; Abby Newman

Matt Miller is the younger brother of Victor Newman (Eric Braeden), whose birth name was Christian Miller. He was portrayed by Robert Parucha when he first appeared in 1985 and departed in 1987. Parucha returned for a brief visit in October 2003. In 2018, Richard Gleason was cast in the role. Gleason made his debut on September 20, 2018.

He is the youngest son of Albert and Cora Miller. Matt's father abandoned the family when he and his brother Christian were young. Cora could not feed her sons, so she gave them to an orphanage. In 1985, Matt came to Genoa City where he reunited with Christian, now known as Victor Newman. In an attempt to get Victor away from Ashley Abbott (Eileen Davidson), Victor's wife Nikki Newman (Melody Thomas Scott) set her and Matt up, but it did not work. He left town in 1987. In 2003, he returned briefly to reveal to Victor that their father Albert was actually alive and on his deathbed.

== Lindsey Wells ==
Lindsey Wells
- The Young and the Restless character
- Portrayed by: Lauren Koslow (1984–86)
- Duration: 1984–86
- First appearance: January 19, 1984
- Last appearance: April 28, 1986
- Introduced by: William J. Bell
In-universe information
- Occupation: Worked at Jabot Cosmetics
- Husband: Jack Abbott (1986)

Lindsey Wells first appeared in January 1984. She is an ex-wife and girlfriend of Jack Abbott. She was portrayed by actress Lauren Koslow from 1984 to 1986. The character was also seen in disguise as early as November 1983.

Lindsey was a former girlfriend of Jack Abbott who worked for Jabot. She took illicit photos of Jack and Jill Foster Abbott's affair, then blackmailed the two into giving her higher positions in the company and other concessions – knowing that if John Abbott ever saw her pictures, he would disown his son Jack and divorce Jill. In order to get close to the negatives, Jack concocted a plan to marry Lindsey in a fake ceremony. As soon has she discovered the marriage ceremony was a fake, she sold the negatives to Jill's nemesis Katherine Chancellor. John eventually saw the pictures, but both Lindsey and Katherine tried to protect him by covering up Jack's face, and resisted any requests to testify at his divorce trial with Jill. Jill ultimately confessed to John that it was indeed Jack with her in the photos, and John then confronted Lindsey to confirm the truth. Soon after that, Lindsey left Genoa City and moved to New York.

== Miguel Rodriguez ==
Miguel Rodriguez
- The Young and the Restless character
- Portrayed by: Anthony Pena
- Duration: 1984–2006
- First appearance: April 25, 1984
- Last appearance: May 16, 2006
- Introduced by: William J. Bell
In-universe information
- Occupation: Housekeeper; Servant

Miguel Rodriguez first appeared in April 1984, portrayed by Anthony Pena. He was placed on contract with the series until being downgraded to recurring status in May 2006. The character was a longtime servant to the Newman family.

For over twenty years, soft-spoken Miguel Rodriguez was the loyal servant of the Newman family. He started working for Victor Newman, but later took care of the entire Newman family and eventually became the head of the Newman Ranch staff. He was best known for his delicious cooking and for setting up parties for the entire family. He was always there when someone needed advice, but he never really had a storyline of his own until 1997. Before that, he was only known to have briefly dated Esther Valentine, a servant at the Chancellor mansion. Miguel had said he was only going to work for the Newmans until his brother graduated from medical school and then he would be free to explore a more intellectual career of his own. That goal never materialized for Miguel, as he apparently preferred to spend his years working for the Newmans.

In 1997, Miguel fell in love with Veronica Landers, but he knew her as "Sarah", a new servant at the ranch. Veronica was plotting revenge on her ex-husband Joshua Landers, who was at the time married to Nikki Newman. "Sarah" got her revenge by fatally shooting Joshua and wounding Nikki. Miguel did not know of "Sarah's" crimes and continued to support her and looked for possible jobs for her, until it was finally revealed that "Sarah" was really Veronica. She died in Miguel's arms.

Miguel would continue to serve as the Newman's butler/house manager until 2008, though he was not seen after 2006. A new house manager, Estella Munoz, was introduced in April 2008. On June 5, 2008, it was revealed that he had officially left his position at the Newman Ranch in order to care for his aunt, who had been diagnosed with diabetes. The Newman family was saddened to see him go, but understood the necessity. As a farewell gift, Nikki and Victor decided to send him a small gold clock that had sat on the fireplace mantle for many years and which Miguel had often wound up.

== Tyrone Jackson ==
Tyrone Jackson
- The Young and the Restless character
- Portrayed by: Phil Morris
- Duration: 1984–86
- First appearance: May 30, 1984
- Last appearance: June 6, 1986
- Created by: William J. Bell
In-universe information
- Other names: Leon; Robert Tyrone
- Occupation: Attorney; Former law student
- Brothers: Elwood "Jazz" Jackson
- Wife: Alana Anthony (1984–86)

Tyrone Jackson is a fictional character from the CBS soap opera, The Young and the Restless. The role was portrayed by Phil Morris from 1984 to 1986.

In 1984, Jazz Jackson's (Jon St. Elwood) younger brother, Tyrone, a law student, arrives in Genoa City and becomes reacquainted with his brother. Shortly after arriving in town, Tyrone investigates the activities of Genoa City's local organized crime family, headed by Joseph Anthony (Logan Ramsey). The mob boss orders his henchman, Jazz, to kill Tyrone, unaware that Jazz is working undercover with Tyrone, and further unaware that Jazz is Tyrone's brother. To save both their lives, Jazz takes the corpse of a man whose face is damaged beyond recognition and fools Anthony into believing the body is Tyrone. Meanwhile, Tyrone (who is African American) uses heavy theatrical make-up to disguise himself as a Caucasian and infiltrate Anthony's organization. Under the alias "Robert Tyrone", he quickly becomes one of Anthony's most trusted advisors. No one else is aware of the ruse except Jazz, Tyrone's former girlfriend, Amy Lewis (Stephanie E. Williams), and private investigator Andy Richards (Steven Ford).

As part of his cover, Tyrone romances Anthony's daughter, Alana (Amy Gibson), who is unaware of her father's criminal activities. After Alana falls in love with "Robert", her father insists that he marry her. With Tyrone's help, Jazz and Andy manage to gather enough evidence to dismantle the organization, but their investigation is discovered by Anthony, who orders their deaths. Tyrone breaks his cover and convinces one of Anthony's men, "Kong", to help him save Jazz and Andy. The police arrive to rescue the two men and bring Anthony to justice, but not before "Robert" and Alana are married. A shootout ensues and Anthony is killed. Because his assistance saved Jazz and Andy from certain death, Kong—whose real name is Nathan Hastings (Nathan Purdee) -- is granted immunity from prosecution.

With the Anthony organization destroyed, "Robert" removes his disguise, revealing to a shocked Alana that his real name is Tyrone Jackson and that he is Black. Although initially hurt and betrayed, Alana becomes obsessed with Tyrone and claims she still loves him, regardless of his true identity or the color of his skin. Although Tyrone has developed genuine affection for Alana, he is not in love with her. After Alana finally accepts this, the couple has the marriage annulled and she leaves Genoa City. Tyrone attempts to reconcile with Amy, but discovers that she is more interested in Nathan. Soon thereafter Tyrone, now a licensed attorney, leaves town.

== Shawn Garrett ==
Shawn Garrett
- The Young and the Restless character
- Portrayed by: Tom McConnell (1984); Grant Cramer (1984–86)
- Duration: 1984–86
- First appearance: August 16, 1984
- Last appearance: March 21, 1986
- Introduced by: William J. Bell
In-universe information
- Mother: Vivian Garrett

Shawn Garrett first appeared in September 1984, portrayed by Tom McConnell. Grant Cramer then took over the role until March 21, 1986.

Shawn Garrett was a stalker who is obsessed with singer Lauren Fenmore (Tracey E. Bregman). First, Shawn tries to sabotage Lauren's singing partner, Danny Romalotti, by slipping him poison that affected his voice. Shawn then threatened Lauren to divorce her husband at the time, Paul Williams, and move in with him or he would arrange a hit man to kill Paul. Lauren tried to contact Paul to tell him the truth about Shawn's plans, but she was watched too closely by Shawn to make any contact with her former husband. Shawn later took a reluctant Lauren to San Francisco where he showed her the area near his childhood home. Lauren later got in touch with Shawn's stepfather, Mark Wilcox, who revealed that Shawn had burned down his childhood home, killing his mother, after she and Mark told him they were marrying, which Shawn opposed. After discovering that she did not love him and was only agreeing to his demands to keep Paul alive, Shawn tried to bury Lauren alive. Lauren was rescued by Paul and his detective partner, Andy Richards, who found her with the help of her psychic friend, Tamra Logan. Shawn had poisoned Tamra after Lauren confessed to her while she was comatose in the hospital that she hated Shawn. Tamra awoke and murmured the words, "Lauren" and "danger", to her doctor. Her doctor then went to Paul Williams to tell him of what she knew. Shawn was killed in the ensuing gunfire with Paul and Andy.

== Joanna Manning ==
Joanna Manning
- The Young and the Restless character
- Portrayed by: Susan Seaforth Hayes
- Duration: 1984–89; 2003; 2005–07; 2010
- First appearance: December 7, 1984
- Last appearance: August 18, 2010
- Introduced by: William J. Bell
- Crossover appearances: The Bold and the Beautiful
In-universe information
- Husband: Neil Fenmore (1959–83)
- Daughters: Lauren Fenmore
- Grandsons: Scotty Grainger; Dylan Fenmore (legal); Fenmore Baldwin

Joanna Manning first appeared in 1983 as the mother of Lauren Fenmore and ex-wife of the late Neil Fenmore. She was portrayed by actress Susan Seaforth Hayes from 1984 to 1989. She returned in 2005 after a 17-year absence for several guest appearances, and then returned again in 2006, 2007 and 2010. She also appeared on sister show The Bold and the Beautiful on May 15, 2003 and in 2005.

Joanna Manning went to high school with Neil Fenmore, John Abbott, Dina Mergeron, Stuart Brooks, Suzanne Lynch, Katherine Chancellor and Gary Reynolds. Many of the friendships they formed lasted through the years. Lauren was the only child of wealthy Genoa City retailer Neil and socialite Joanna who divorced when Lauren was a small child. Joanna did not come back into Lauren's life until she was out of high school. At one point, Lauren heard Joanna say she wished she had an abortion, which was devastating to Lauren. Joanna only came back after Neil had contacted her while Lauren was being held captive by an obsessed fan, Shawn Garrett.

When Lauren and Joanna were reunited, Lauren at first wanted nothing to do with her, but as Joanna began to win over Lauren's trust, their reconciliation became inevitable. Lauren hoped that Joanna and Neil would reconcile, but while the bitterness of their divorce had dwindled, Joanna insisted that she had moved on. She set her sights on wealthy John, then separated from Jill Foster, and prevented John from reconciling with his ex-wife, Dina, by insinuating that there was more than just friendship involved. However, John and Joanna never made it past a few comfortable evenings together, and Joanna ended up in an affair with the younger Marc Mergeron, Dina's stepson, whom she did not love, but who provided what she needed as a lover. After Marc left her to return to France, Joanna remained as a confidante to her daughter after Neil died, but when Marc asked her to join him, she could not resist and bid farewell to her daughter once again.

In 2005, Joanna returned to town to attend Lauren's wedding to Michael Baldwin after being unseen for 17 years. When Lauren and Michael's son, Fenmore Baldwin, was born, he had to stay in the hospital for a little while. He was finally able to go home, but the Baldwin household was frantic due to the bickering between Joanna and Michael's mother Gloria Fisher, amongst other issues. Joanna returned to town the following year and worked at Jabot for John as a designer/stylist. She was attracted to John which was not reciprocated and she left town; she reconciled with Marc. Later, Joanna came back to town on several occasions and had an affair with John.

In 2010, Jill's lawyer, Morgan Belford, files a lawsuit to get half the inheritance that Lauren had received after their father Neil's death. Lauren tried an amicable settlement, but Jill thought she was faking the peace offering and pulled another publicity stunt; an interview at Neil's gravesite. Lauren showed up, they fought on the air, and Lauren shoved Jill into an open grave. They went to court and Jill's lawyer put Joanna on the stand. She told how Neil brooded about his illegitimate daughter throughout their marriage, and his guilt was responsible for turning Lauren into a spoiled brat. After Neil recovered from learning Jill's mother had died, he tried to track down the child and failed. Joanna claimed Neil cared more for a dead woman and her child than his own wife, which was why they divorced when Lauren was only a little girl and Lauren stayed with her father. The judge ruled that Neil knew of another child when he wrote his will saying, "Any and all of my living heirs." The judge awarded 50% of Neil's assets to Jill. Lauren caught her mother as they left court asking how she could be so cruel to her own daughter, asking if she even knew that Lauren had been kidnapped a few months earlier by Sarah Smythe. Lauren told Joanna to go back to her villa and her younger men, and stay out of her life.

== Michael Crawford ==
Michael Crawford
- The Young and the Restless character
- Portrayed by: Colby Chester
- Duration: 1985–1990
- First appearance: October 14, 1985
- Last appearance: May 7, 1990
- Introduced by: William J. Bell
In-universe information
- Occupation: Defense Lawyer

Michael Crawford appeared from October 1985 to May 1987 and from December 1988 to May 1990, portrayed by Colby Chester. The character was one of Genoa City's most active lawyers during the 1980s.

Michael was one of the Genoa City's active lawyers during the 1980s. He entered the picture in 1985 when Jill Foster Abbott approached him for representation in her divorce from John Abbott. During that time, he began having an affair with Jill during and after her first divorce from John. Michael and Jill later ended their affair. In 1986, he saved Jill's life after she was shot by who was thought to be Katherine, John or Jack but it turned out to be Sven, a masseur at the Genoa City Hotel that Jill rejected earlier. Jill later attempts to enlist Michael as a model for Jabot Cosmetics' men's line.

From 1989 into early 1990, Michael represented Nina Webster in her lawsuit against Katherine Chancellor and Jill for possession of Phillip Chancellor III's estate after his presumed death. Michael was last seen in 1990 before moving to Chicago. In October 1991, Jill had some problems with Nina and her mother, Flo. Jill called Michael's secretary in Chicago, and Jill was informed that Michael moved his law practices to New York (off-screen).

== Farren Connor ==
Farren Connor
- The Young and the Restless character
- Portrayed by: Colleen Casey
- Duration: 1986–87
- First appearance: January 8, 1986
- Last appearance: December 2, 1987
- Introduced by: William J. Bell
In-universe information
- Husband: Evan Sanderson (1982–85); Andy Richards (1986–2001)

Farren Connor first appeared on January 8, 1986, portrayed by Colleen Casey. The character is the ex-wife of Andy Richards, and rival of Diane Jenkins. Casey made her final appearance as the character on December 2, 1987.

In 1986, Andy Richards set his sights on mysterious singer Farren Connor. The two became close, but Andy's good friend Lauren Fenmore was suspicious of Farren, who eventually confided in Andy that she had severe amnesia and could not remember anything about her past or true identity. While touring Europe, Diane Jenkins figured out that she loved Andy so she returned, only to find Andy happy with Farren. A concerned Lauren convinced a wary Diane to reconcile with her ex-husband to keep him away from Farren, but Andy wanted nothing more than a friendship with Diane. Soon after, Andy was shot. Paul Williams had to break the news of Andy's shooting to Farren. Andy came out of the emergency room still unconscious which left Farren deeply worried. Paul and Farren prayed for Andy to pull through and later received happy news from Dr. Hank Steele. Paul and Farren were glad when Andy finally woke up. Later, Jazz Jackson and Amy Lewis dressed up as nurses and paid Andy a surprise visit in the hospital. Paul, Jazz and Amy continued to investigate Andy's shooting.

Farren and Paul learned that Andy was released from the hospital the next day. Lauren visited Andy and then ran into Paul at the hospital. Andy was greeted by his friends upon his release. Farren consoled Paul after his unexpected meeting with Shawn Garrett and Lauren. Farren called Paul for help when she was having plumbing problems. Andy confided in Paul that he thought Farren was holding something back. He wondered if another man could be the reason. Farren invited Paul over for dinner with her and Andy. Farren was intrigued when she caught a glimpse of woman posing in a magazine ad. Amy then filled Farren in that the woman was Diane, who asked Farren about her intentions regarding Andy because it seemed she was not entirely over her ex-husband. Andy's love life became far more complicated with Farren being jealous of Diane. While Farren was waiting at home, Andy was at Diane's and they kissed. Meanwhile, Andy assured Farren that he was trying to get information on her past. Lauren shared her doubts about Farren with Andy. She was not convinced that Farren really did not remember her past and thought she might have been faking her amnesia. Diane told Lauren that she was giving in and leaving town because Andy and Farren were rock solid. Lauren said she could convince her otherwise. Later on, Andy asked for Lauren's help to dig into Farren's past. Andy and Lauren arrived in Minneapolis to delve into what little information they had on Farren's past. They questioned a doctor who first treated Farren when she wound up in the city. Andy and Lauren arrived at the police station where Farren had an accident. They learned that Farren's car was burned out completely leaving no traces about its origin or owner. There were also no missing person reports matching Farren's description so the police had to close the unsolved case. The only clue they gained was that Farren did not appear to come from the Minneapolis area.

Lauren told Paul about her trip to Minneapolis with Andy. She admitted that Farren's story was true and that were no leads as to her real identity other than a burned powder compact which survived the fire. Nevertheless, Lauren suspected that Farren might not want to regain her memory. Andy also wondered whether Farren left Minneapolis so quickly after her recovery to flee from her past. Farren paid Lauren a visit who then showed her the powder compact but it did not trigger any memories for her. Lauren planned a dinner party for Andy and Farren. Unbeknownst to anyone, Farren had left town. Andy told Lauren and Paul that Farren was missing. Soon after Farren returned and announced she was ready to face her past. Farren's recent disappearance fueled Lauren's mistrust again. She called Diane and told her not to give up hope on Andy. Farren arrived at the hospital for an intensive medical evaluation. Farren had medical tests. In another room of the hospital, Lauren paid her psychic, Tamra Logan, a visit. Lauren handed Tamra Farren's powder compact and asked for her insight. Lauren told Diane that if Farren regained her memory it could easily break up her and Andy. At the hospital, Farren and Andy were waiting for test results. After a brief chat with Diane, Lauren went to the hospital where Andy was anxiously waiting for Farren's test results. Dr. Sloan informed Farren that there was no medical reason for her amnesia. It was simply a question of time and the right context to trigger her memory. Andy proposes to Farren. Farren and Andy broke the news of their engagement to Paul, Amy and Nathan Hastings. Lauren suggested Diane publish Farren's story in national newspapers to find her relatives. Lauren decided to pay a visit to her old friend Gary Thompson, editor at the Genoa City Chronicle. Determined to find out about Farren's past, Lauren put a personal ad in the newspaper. Andy and Farren decided to have an impromptu wedding at Paul's apartment. Paul, Amy and Nathan were by their side. Lauren however could not be reached. Across town, Lauren informed Diane that she set their plan in motion and pretty soon someone would react to the newspaper articles and unveil Farren's identity. Lauren was shocked to learn that Farren and Andy had married. Andy arrived home and found an unexpected visitor in bed; a naked Diane. When Farren showed up, Diane hurried to hide herself. Lauren unsuccessfully tried to pull the article on Farren now that she and Andy were married. The ménage à trois at Andy's was cut short when Farren showed a shocked Diane her wedding band. Lauren received news that the article on Farren had gotten feedback from Minnesota. This unexpected move did not change Diane's mind, though: The former Mrs. Richards had decided to go back to London despite Lauren's pleas to stay. Andy and Farren basked in their newlywed happiness.

Andy and Farren had a belated wedding celebration with Paul and Lauren. Lauren reads the letter which said that Farren's real name is Jennifer and she has a husband waiting for her. Lauren immediately called Wayne Navalle and asked him some questions. As this proves to be false lead Lauren plead with Gary to pull any further articles. Meanwhile, a mysterious stranger looked at an article about Farren and wrote a letter. Farren feared that Lauren did not support her marriage. Lauren said that Andy's happiness was her only concern. Then, Gary called to inform Lauren that a new letter regarding Farren had arrived. Farren thanked Paul for his advice to talk with Lauren. She was convinced that Lauren was not opposed to her marriage any longer. Lauren was torn over opening the letter but decided to just burn it. Paul sought advice from Andy and Farren about Lauren's idea to join them at the Paul Williams Detective Agency. Unlike Paul they said they could fully understand Lauren's motives. Lauren received an unexpected visit from Gary, another letter regarding Farren had arrived. After having dinner with Farren, Lauren assured Paul that she was now fully behind Farren and Andy's relationship. Eventually Lauren opened the letter and learned that the previous letter which she burned was written by the same person, Farren's supposed husband. Lauren re-read the letter by Farren's supposed husband, Evan Sanderson, when Farren stopped by unexpectedly for a visit. Farren told Lauren that she Andy planned on having a baby. Lauren discussed Farren's case with Gary. He thought Lauren should go see the ominous Evan to either confirm his story or put him off Farren's case. Lauren booked a flight to Pittsburgh. When Paul arrived home, instead of Lauren he only found a letter where she vaguely explained her absence. Farren and Andy went house hunting. Lauren showed up at the Sanderson home in Pittsburgh. After a brief chat with Janet, the maid, Lauren met Evan who was thrilled to hear that Lauren's visit was a result of his letter.

Under the fake name Kathy Wilson, Lauren inquired about Sanderson's story, his wife Michelle had been missing for nearly two years, vanishing while he was on a business trip. Lauren was shocked to see a picture of Michelle Sanderson which had a striking resemblance to Farren. Lauren learned that the Sandersons had a five-year-old daughter, Betsy. Everything implied that Farren was in fact Michelle Sanderson. However, Lauren told Evan that his wife and her good friend were not the same person. Farren explained to Andy, Paul and Amy that she was no longer curious about her past but was looking forward. Returning home, Lauren apologized to Paul who was infuriated by her secrecy. In Pittsburgh, Evan saw a resemblance between his wife and the woman pictured in the paper. After a chat with Farren, Paul went to see Lauren and apologized for his overblown reaction. Lauren told Gary the complex story about her visit with Evan. Evan came to town and revealed Michelle's story to Farren. Farren did not remember her husband or her daughter. After Evan had accepted his wife's amnesia as permanent and prepared to return home to Pittsburgh, Farren's memory suddenly returned. Farren reconnected with Evan and Betsy, but Evan was shot dead by his jealous housekeeper and former lover, Janet. In 1987, Farren decided she needed to move to Pittsburgh to be a mother to Betsy. Andy decided to move to Pittsburgh to be a family with Farren and Betsy. In 2002, Andy returned to town after being unseen for fifteen years, and mentioned that he and Farren divorced a year earlier, suggesting a separation in 2001.

== David Kimble ==
David Kimble
- The Young and the Restless character
- Portrayed by: Drew Pillsbury (1986); Michael Corbett (1986–91)
- Duration: 1986–91
- First appearance: April 23, 1986
- Last appearance: October 7, 1991
- Introduced by: William J. Bell
In-universe information
- Other names: Tom Harper; Jim Adams
- Occupation: Con artist
- Wife: Rebecca Kimble (1984–85); Nina Webster (1990–91); Florence Webster (1991 - invalid: he had been posing as "Jim Adams" at the time)

David Kimble first appeared on April 23, 1986. The character was the second husband of Nina Webster and a murderer and a con artist. Most notable in the role, Michael Corbett made his final appearance as the character on October 7, 1991.

In 1986, David showed up in Genoa City as the attractive new assistant to Jill Abbott, who was in charge of the men's line at Jabot Cosmetics. David romanced Jill, knowing that she was connected to the Chancellor fortune, and hoping to get his hands on it. But Jill moved on to attorney Michael Crawford, and fired David. Once David realized that Jill's daughter-in-law, Nina Webster, had just inherited a sizable fortune from her deceased husband, Phillip Chancellor III, he wanted to acquire it from her. Nina started dating David. She fell for him despite the warnings of her best friends Christine "Cricket" Blair, Danny Romalotti and Chase Benson who were all suspicious of David's motives.

David threatened Christine that he would cut up her face and she would never model again if she did not stay out of his business. Christine told Nina, but Nina was so in love she did not believe her. David and Nina shocked everyone by quickly eloping, and he signed a prenuptial agreement to prove his love. Nina set up David in a company named David A. Kimble Investments, but he really had no clients, just sat at a desk in an office reading the paper and faked business calls whenever Nina would drop by. It did not take long before he began an affair with the mail room attendant, Diane Westin. David soon realized that all of Nina's inheritance was in a trust for her son, Phillip Chancellor IV, so the only way he could get his hands on the Chancellor fortune was to adopt her son. David pressured Nina to agree to the adoption, but Jill and Katherine Chancellor helped her resist. Diane came across a New Jersey newspaper clipping about heiress Rebecca Harper who had been murdered by her husband, Tom. The photo of Tom and Rebecca showed a man who looked like David, and she was wearing a brooch like the one David had given to Diane to wrap as a present for Nina. David discovered that Rebecca's friend, Vivian, was in Genoa City intent on finding the brooch to prove that David murdered Rebecca, but it was not long before her body was discovered electrocuted in her bathtub.

While digging into David's background, Cricket also found the photo of Rebecca with David and recognized the brooch. Cricket broke the news about him to Nina, but she had already learned about it from Diane. Nina had also learned that David was plotting to murder both her and little Phillip. While she was with Danny in New Jersey, Cricket found a jeweler who identified the brooch as belonging to Rebecca.

David then framed Danny for cocaine possession to get them off his tail, but all charges were eventually dropped. Soon after, Danny and Cricket married. Feeling betrayed and infuriated, a crazed Nina welcomed David home by shooting him five times. David survived, but pretended to be paralyzed, and Nina was arrested for attempted murder. While on the witness stand, Nina testified that she shot David out of self-defense because she was convinced that he wanted to kill her and Phillip. Her emotional testimony moved the jury and she was found not guilty. Meanwhile, David stole a body from the morgue, planted it in his hospital bed, and set it on fire to fake his own death. David coerced a plastic surgeon to make him look like David Hasselhoff. Instead, the surgeon carved the word "killer" on his forehead and fled while David was under the anesthetic. David returned to Genoa City as "Jim Adams" with makeup on his forehead, hair dyed gray, a mustache and a Southern accent. He romanced and married Nina's mother, Flo Webster, and manipulated Nina into changing her will so that he and Flo would be co-beneficiaries in the event of Nina's death. In 1991, Nina, Danny and Cricket attended a masquerade ball charity event, and David showed up dressed in the same costume as Danny (a wolf) intending to kill them all. But David's former mistress, Diane, learned of his plan and replaced the bullets in his gun with wax ones. When David cornered the trio in a maze outdoors, they were in on it and convinced David that he had shot and killed all three. While David was being pursued by the police and private detective Paul Williams, he ducked into a garbage chute and was then fatally mutilated by a garbage compactor.

In 2022, Charlie Mason from Soaps She Knows placed David 22nd on his list of the best 25 characters from The Young and the Restless, calling him the "antithesis" of Traci Abbott (Beth Maitland) and a "manipulative monster" who "enjoyed a reign of terror that didn't end until he made the mistake—the hilariously appropriate mistake!—of trying to avoid his comeuppance by hiding in a garbage compactor and giving "trashed" a whole new meaning!".

== Steven Lassiter ==
Steven Lassiter
- The Young and the Restless character
- Portrayed by: Rod Arrants
- Duration: 1987–88
- First appearance: January 6, 1987
- Last appearance: December 2, 1988
- Introduced by: William J. Bell
In-universe information
- Wife: Ashley Abbott (1988)

Steven Lassiter first appeared on January 6, 1987, portrayed by Rod Arrants on a contract status. The character was a psychiatrist and the first husband of Ashley Abbott. Arrants made his final appearance on December 2, 1988, when the character was shot to death.

In 1986, Steven was the psychiatrist of Ashley Abbott and Leanna Love. He fell in love with Ashley. When Nikki Newman went into remission, Victor Newman was free to be with Ashley, but she had moved on to Steven. Ashley and Steven married in 1988, but before long Steven was shot to death by the son of one of his patients.

== Jessica Blair Grainger ==
Jessica Blair Grainger
- The Young and the Restless character
- Portrayed by: Rebecca Street
- Duration: 1988–89
- First appearance: January 7, 1988
- Last appearance: November 11, 1989
- Introduced by: William J. Bell
In-universe information
- Husband: John Abbott (1988–89); Jim Grainger (1989)
- Daughters: Christine Blair
- Nephews: Joe Blair

Jessica Blair Grainger first appeared in January 1988 as the mother of Christine Blair. She was also a wife of John Abbott. She was portrayed by Rebecca Street.

Jessica, the estranged mother of Christine Blair, arrived in Genoa City dying from AIDS and hoping to reunite with her daughter. Eventually, Jessica and Cricket made amends. However, Jessica originally tried to keep her illness a secret from everybody in town, including John Abbott, with whom she fell in love, but they all learned of her illness after she had to be hospitalized due to the symptoms. While being treated, she realized her doctor, Scott Grainger, was the son of her ex-lover, Jim Grainger, making him Cricket's half-brother. Despite her illness, John proposed to a hesitant Jessica and, two months later, she and John were married. In early 1989, Cricket located Jim Grainger and arranged for him to come to Genoa City and got proof of him being her father. With her condition worsening, Jessica's last wish was to reunite with her family: Jim, Scott and Cricket. John granted her a divorce, and Jessica and Jim married shortly before she died from AIDS.

== Lynne Bassett ==
Lynne Bassett
- The Young and the Restless character
- Portrayed by: Laura Bryan Birn
- Duration: 1988–2005
- First appearance: March 7, 1988
- Last appearance: 2005
- Introduced by: William J. Bell
In-universe information
- Occupation: Secretary

Lynne Bassett first appeared in April 1988, portrayed by Laura Bryan Birn, daughter of former writer Jerry Birn. The character was a secretary and romance of Paul Williams. She made her final appearance in 2005.

Paul Williams hires Lynne as his replacement secretary after former secretary Amy Lewis left town to take care of her father. Lynne becomes his friend and was always there for him in his time of need both on the job and off. Lynne also had a crush on Paul, but he never returned her feelings, even though they briefly dated. When Christine Blair was date-raped in 1989, Lynne confided to Christine that she was once a victim of rape. Lynne committed the crime of breaking and entering into Michael Baldwin's office, in which she, along with Paul's mother, Mary, were arrested as they were looking for evidence that Michael was conspiring with Paul's then-wife, Isabella Brana. In fall 2004, Lynne was out of a job when Paul closed his practice. He teamed up and went to work as an investigator at the Baldwin and Blair Law Firm with Michael and Christine. Soon after, Lynne leaves town to visit her mother.

== Lisa Mansfield ==
Lisa Mansfield
- The Young and the Restless character
- Portrayed by: Lynne Harbaugh
- Duration: 1988–89
- First appearance: March 31, 1988
- Last appearance: March 3, 1989
- Introduced by: William J. Bell
In-universe information
- Husband: Brad Carlton (1982–83)

Lisa Mansfield first appeared in March 1988. She is the first ex-wife of Brad Carlton. She was portrayed by Lynne Harbaugh until March 3, 1989.

Lisa and Brad married in 1982, but Brad divorced Lisa in 1983 after her father, who disapproved of their marriage, paid Brad a large sum of money to divorce his daughter. In 1988, Lisa resurfaced in Brad's life, who was now married to Traci Abbott, and Lisa offered Brad a lucrative job in Chicago. When Brad declined and instead accepted a job offer from his former lover, Lauren Fenmore, Lisa became obsessed with Brad, and she drugged and kidnapped him. Lisa held Brad captive in a cage in a deserted mountain cabin for several weeks. During this time, Traci felt that Brad had abandoned her, and she later suffered a miscarriage. Brad's absence caused her to take comfort with her former lover, Tim Sullivan. In early 1989, Lauren was on a ski trip with Jack Abbott, and they spotted Lisa. Suspecting that Lisa was somehow linked to Brad's mysterious disappearance, Lauren followed her back to the cabin, where she was holding Brad. Lisa spotted Lauren, and she threw her into the cage with Brad, intending to gas them both to death. Fortunately, Jack, who had tracked Lauren to the cabin, rescued them. Lisa fled town and has not been seen since.

== Scott Grainger Sr. ==
Scott Grainger Sr.
- The Young and the Restless character
- Portrayed by: Peter Barton
- Duration: 1988–93
- First appearance: March 15, 1988
- Last appearance: November 16, 1993
- Introduced by: William J. Bell
- Crossover appearances: The Bold and the Beautiful
In-universe information
- Occupation: Physician
- Father: Jim Grainger
- Half-sisters: Christine Blair
- Wife: Lauren Fenmore (1989–91, 1992–93); Sheila Carter (1991–92)
- Sons: Scotty Grainger

Scott Grainger first appeared in March 1988, portrayed by Peter Barton until November 2, 1993. Scott Grainger was known for being a part of the love triangle with Lauren Fenmore and Sheila Carter. The character also briefly appeared on The Bold and the Beautiful from November 2 to 16, 1993, when the character was killed off.

Scott entered the picture as the doctor working on Jessica Blair, who had AIDS. In 1989, Jessica's daughter, Christine Blair, fell in love with Scott and they became engaged. The engagement was brought to an end when Christine discovered that Scott was her brother, as the result of an affair between Jessica and Scott's father, Jim. While Christine was disappointed, she was thrilled to be able to meet her real father, Jim. Scott began dating Lauren Fenmore. Christine was raped by Derek Stuart and pressed charges against him. Infuriated by the prospect of a long prison sentence, Derek cornered Christine with a gun, but as he pulled the trigger, Scott arrived and jumped in front of Christine, taking the bullet for her. Scott's near death experience prompted him to propose to Lauren. They married in 1990, despite Lauren's feelings for ex-husband Paul Williams.

Lauren suffered a miscarriage. Scott was not bothered, as he was unaware that Lauren was even pregnant. He turned to nurse Sheila Carter for comfort. Scott and Lauren decided to give their marriage another try, but both Lauren and Sheila then announced that they were pregnant with Scott's child. Sheila's baby was stillborn. Desperate to have Scott's child, she stole Lauren's newborn son and named him Scott Grainger Jr., replacing him with a black market baby, who Lauren named Dylan. Scott left Lauren and married Sheila. Sheila's mother, Molly Carter, discovered the truth about the "baby switch" and decided to tell Lauren. However, on her way to Lauren's office, Molly had a stroke, which left her mute. Lauren began to visit Molly in hospital, so Sheila formed an elaborate scheme to make it look like her mother had committed suicide. She then had Molly committed to a psychiatric hospital. Lauren's "son", Dylan, soon died of meningitis. Worried that Molly would tell Lauren the truth, Sheila kidnapped both her mother and Lauren and held them hostage at a farmhouse out of town. Intending to kill them both, Sheila confessed to switching the babies. She then set fire to the farmhouse, with Lauren and Molly barely escaping. Sheila was pronounced dead and Lauren returned to Scott and Scotty.

Shortly after, Scott was diagnosed with a terminal illness, which he kept secret from Lauren. When Lauren discovered Sheila to be alive and well in Los Angeles, she persuaded Scott to vacation with her on Catalina Island, so she could humiliate Sheila in front of her new husband Eric Forrester. Lauren was later amazed to learn that Scott already knew that Sheila was alive, as she had visited him in the hospital shortly before. Lauren persuaded him to talk to Eric about Sheila, but an ill Scott died before he could say anything. His dying wish was for Lauren to move on with her life and to give Sheila a second chance.

== Chase Benson ==
Chase Benson
- The Young and the Restless character
- Portrayed by: Stephen Gregory
- Duration: 1988–91
- First appearance: July 28, 1988
- Last appearance: February 1991
- Introduced by: William J. Bell

Chase Benson first appeared in July 1988, portrayed by Stephen Gregory. The character was a man hired by Katherine Chancellor and Jill Foster Abbott to get Nina Webster out of Phillip Chancellor III's life. Gregory made his final appearance in February 1991.

Storylines Chase arrived on the scene when Jill Foster Abbott and Katherine Chancellor hired and paid him to get Nina Webster out of Phillip Chancellor III's life. Jill and Kay could not stand Nina, who kept pursuing Phillip and became pregnant with his son, Chance. Chase Benson's job was to keep Nina occupied while Jill and Kay sought custody of Chance, but Nina ended things with Chase after she learned that he was working with Jill and Kay. While escorting Nina, Chase fell for Christine Blair, who did not trust him at all before the truth came out about him working for Jill and Kay. After the chaos with Jill, Kay and Nina was over, Chase went from being a bad guy to a good guy and became friends with Nina, Christine and Danny Romalotti. Chase was hired at Jabot Cosmetics by Jack Abbott to work in the advertising department. Chase later began flirting with Lauren Fenmore, who originally led him to believe that she was merely a salesperson at Fenmore's Department Stores instead of its wealthy CEO, but he stopped seeing her after learning the truth. In 1990, Chase was fixed up with a woman named Vivian, who was later murdered by David Kimble. Chase was last seen in early 1991.

== Clint Radison ==
Clint Radison
- The Young and the Restless character
- Portrayed by: Sal Landi (1988–89); James Michael Gregary (1989–2009)
- Duration: 1988–91; 2009
- First appearance: December 12, 1988
- Last appearance: March 26, 2009
- Introduced by: William J. Bell
In-universe information
- Occupation: Criminal
- Wife: Gina Roma (1989–94)

Clint Radison first appeared on December 12, 1988, portrayed by Sal Landi. The role was then taken over by James Michael Gregary in 1989. The character became the husband of Gina Roma, and former cellmate of Rex Sterling. Gregary returned to the role on January 16, 2009, after a 19-year absence. His return occurred over three months until March 26, 2009.

History
A former cellmate of Rex Sterling, Clint showed up in Genoa City and found out that Gina Roma was his daughter, so he developed a plot to seduce her, and eventually married her. In the meantime, he had stumbled upon Marge Cotrooke, a look-alike of town's richest citizen, Katherine Chancellor, so he started training Marge, along with his friends, to take over Kay's position and kidnap Kay and her maid Esther Valentine. His plan was foiled when Kay's son Brock Reynolds and lawyer Mitchell Sherman revealed their plot and saved Kay and Esther's lives. Clint went to prison after Marge decided to help Kay. Clint escaped a few months later and Kay nearly attacked him when he showed up on her doorstep, but she was stopped by Gina who declared she still had feelings for Clint. Realizing Kay was upset over her encounter with Clint, Brock decided to talk some sense into Gina. Ignoring Gina's plea to give Clint another chance, however, Brock planned to turn him in. While Gina was begging Clint not to turn himself in, Brock was attacked by an armed robber. Clint arrived on the scene, but it was too late to stop the robber from shooting Brock. Although Clint wanted to help Brock, Clint decided to make a run for it. Kay later assumed Clint was responsible for Brock's shooting. However, Clint managed to call for help for Brock and Brock was rushed to the hospital. Rex was shocked by Kay's admission that Clint saved Brock's life. Later, Rex arrived at Gina's, demanding that she tell him where Clint was. Coming out of hiding, Clint told Rex he never intended to hurt Gina. Gina was mortified when Clint admitted he called the police. Clint was returned to prison.

Nineteen years later in January 2009, after leaving prison, Clint found his way back to Genoa City to get his hands on the Chancellor fortune. He started working with Roger Wilkes in a plot to marry Esther. At the same time, Clint found out that Marge ended up in a car crash with Kay, and that Kay might still be alive, but unable to prove her identity. When Roger and Clint's plot to marry Esther was going too slow for them because Esther thought Kay might be alive, Clint decided to take a different plan and kidnap Kay, which he eventually did, taking her to an unknown location where she was being watched by Annie Wilkes, another one of Clint's accomplices.

Kay attempted to escape on several occasions, even by convincing Annie to help her out, but Clint always came in time to stop them. When he realized he was done watching over them, he set up a bomb at the hotel where Kay and her maid Esther were being held and then ran away along with Roger and Annie. While going away, Clint kidnapped Kevin Fisher and decided to use him for his future plans. Sensing how dangerous Clint had become, Annie and Roger ran away, leaving Kevin alone with Clint. After learning about Kevin's childhood traumas on television, Clint tortured and traumatized Kevin into robbing banks dressed in a chipmunk costume. Clint was overjoyed every time Kevin brought him money until one day he had a heart attack and collapsed on the floor, leaving Kevin worrying that he could have killed Clint. Amber Moore first saw Clint's body when Kevin locked her inside the closet, and Clint's body was later found by Michael Baldwin and Daniel Romalotti. On March 26, 2009, Clint's eternal fate was disclosed by the spirit of Marge Cotrooke. Back one more time while her corpse was disinterred for DNA testing, Marge revealed Clint did not make it to heaven, having taken a "southern detour" instead.

== John Silva ==
John Silva first appeared on July 7, 1989, portrayed by John Castellanos under contract until choosing to drop to recurring in the late nineties to focus on his writing. The character was an active lawyer in Genoa City. Castellanos made his final appearance in April 2004.

History
John arrived in town in 1989 when he served as Derek Stuart's lawyer when on trial for date raping Christine Blair. Eventually, John Silva became the town's most active lawyer, mostly working on cases with new lawyer Christine. Silva represented residents of the town in various cases, from drug charges, sexual harassment, murders, divorces to custody battles. He primarily worked for the Newman and Abbott families. His personal life was not fully explored, but he did have a brief relationship with Nina Webster and an affair with Jill Foster Abbott before simply not being seen again.

== Glenn Richards ==
Glenn Richards
- The Young and the Restless character
- Portrayed by: Brendan Burns
- Duration: 1989; 1991–93; 1995–97; 1999; 2001; 2003–06
- First appearance: July 20, 1989
- Last appearance: January 25, 2006
- Introduced by: William J. Bell
In-universe information
- Occupation: District Attorney; Prosecutor

Glenn Richards first appeared in August 1989, portrayed by Brendan Burns on a recurring status. The character was an active prosecutor and later district attorney in Genoa City. Burns made his final appearance on January 25, 2006.

History
Glenn is a tough prosecutor and later district attorney, who always wanted to see Genoa City residents prosecuted to the full extent of the law and usually Glenn came out on top, but something would usually come to light about the person whose in trouble that led Glenn to losing cases once the person got off when evidence came to light proven them innocent. He was the prosecutor on Nina Webster's case after she shot her then husband David Kimble and prosecuted the 1995 case against Nicholas Newman who was tried for the shooting of Matt Clark. Glenn was later appointed District Attorney and for a good while worked with Christine Blair. Glenn is not related to Andy Richards despite the fact they have the same last name.

== Marge Cotrooke ==
Marge Cotrooke
- The Young and the Restless character
- Portrayed by: Jeanne Cooper
- Duration: 1989–90; 2008–09
- First appearance: September 20, 1989
- Last appearance: March 26, 2009
- Created by: William J. Bell
- Introduced by: Edward J. Scott (1989); Maria Arena Bell (2008)
In-universe information
- Other names: Katherine "Kay" Chancellor

Marge Cotrooke first appeared in 1989 as Katherine Chancellor's look alike. She was also portrayed by Cooper from 1989 to 1990, before returning in 2008 and 2009.

History
In 1989 when Katherine Chancellor married Rex Sterling, a bum that spent some time in prison, his former cellmate Clint Radison found Marge Cotrooke, a diner waitress, and realized that she looked exactly like Katherine. He decided to use her in his plan to replace Kay with Marge and get to her fortune. His friends got jobs at the Chancellor mansion, while Marge was taught to act like Kay. Kay Chancellor and her housekeeper, Esther Valentine, were held captive while Marge replaced Kay. Marge immediately changed things in Katherine's life, starting with unintentionally pushing Rex into the arms of Jill Abbott. She also sold Chancellor Industries. When Kay's son, Brock Reynolds, returned from India, he realized that someone had replaced Kay. Marge later helped Kay catch Clint and his friends and get them in jail before returning to her life as a waitress.

Marge returned to Kay's life in October 2008, asking her for help with her problems. Katherine realized that Marge had become an alcoholic, and Kay wanted to help her beat the addiction as a payoff for Marge saving her life years ago. Kay never told anyone about Marge's problems and started showing signs of dementia, but she refused to give up on shipping Marge to a rehabilitation center. While at a local pub, Jeffrey Bardwell spotted Marge, drunk, and he thought she was Katherine. Kay finally decided to drive Marge to the center herself, but she ended up in a serious car crash. Marge died in the crash, but the general populace of Genoa City was convinced that Katherine Chancellor was dead.

Marge briefly returned as a ghost, aware that she was dead, but realized after seeing the people attending her funeral, specifically Esther, that they incorrectly believed she was Katherine. Deducing that Kay must still have been near the scene of the accident, she appeared near the crash site and discovered Kay's body lying motionless by the riverbank. She unsuccessfully attempted to awaken her friend. Her spirit soon dissipated. Patrick Murphy arrived and rescued Kay, believing she was Marge. He took care of her until it was revealed that she was really Katherine and had lost her memory.

== See also ==
- The Young and the Restless characters (1970s)
- The Young and the Restless characters introduced from 1980–1984
- The Young and the Restless characters (1990s)
- The Young and the Restless characters (2000s)
- The Young and the Restless characters (2010s)
