= Danny Romalotti =

Fictional character from the American CBS soap opera The Young and the Restless

- The Young and the Restless character
- Portrayed by: Michael Damian
- Duration: 1981–1998; 2002–2004; 2008; 2012–2013; 2022–present
- First appearance: June 24, 1981
- Created by: William J. Bell
- Introduced by: John Conboy (1981); David Shaughnessy (2002); David Shaughnessy and John F. Smith (2003); Josh Griffith (2008); Maria Arena Bell and Paul Rauch (2008); Jill Farren Phelps (2012, 2013); Anthony Morina and Josh Griffith (2022); Bradley Bell (2024)
- Crossover appearances: The Bold and the Beautiful
In-universe information
- Other names: Daniel Romalotti, Sr.
- Occupation: Rock singer
- Father: Rex Sterling
- Sisters: Gina Roma
- Wife: Traci Abbott (1985); Christine Blair (1990–1994, 2025–present); Phyllis Summers (1994–1996, 1997)
- Sons: Daniel Romalotti (legal)
- Granddaughters: Lucy Romalotti (legal)

Danny Romalotti is a fictional character from the CBS soap opera The Young and the Restless, portrayed by Michael Damian. The character of Danny first appeared in Genoa City, the town where Y&R is set, in 1981. Damian and his character Danny exited the show in 1998, though Danny has returned on several occasions in 2002, 2003 to 2004, 2008, 2012 to 2013, and 2022 to 2023. A rock star, the character is known for his relationships with Traci Abbott, Lauren Fenmore, Christine "Cricket" Blair, and Phyllis Summers.

== Storylines ==
=== 1981–98 ===
Danny began his career at 16 years old in 1981 as a teenage rock star doing concerts in Genoa City. He was often joined by his sister, Gina Roma (Patty Weaver), and his friends Traci Abbott (Beth Maitland), Lauren Fenmore (Tracey E. Bregman), and Amy Lewis (Stephanie E. Williams), who sang with him when he performed on stage. Lauren also joined him on the road for a time.

In 1984, Danny married friend and fan club president, Traci Abbott, when she became pregnant by her college professor, Tim Sullivan. Danny had been seeing Patty Williams, who left town devastated. Danny and Traci's marriage was later annulled after she miscarried. Danny became a rock star, toured worldwide and recorded many albums, but home was always Genoa City, where he returned nearly ever summer to do a big concert. He once lost his voice after being slowly poisoned by Shawn Garrett, who was jealous of his relationship with Lauren. He was told he'd never sing again, but he had a miracle recovery during a Christmas Eve church service.

In 1987, Danny and Gina's father, Brian Romalotti (Quinn Redeker), turned up in Genoa City, a homeless drifter just out of prison. He was molded and renamed by Jill Foster Abbott (Jess Walton) as "Rex Sterling" in order to con Kay Chancellor (Jeanne Cooper). Then, Rex and Kay fell in love, and he became a "good guy" after all. They married in 1988, and again in 1992. Danny, Gina and Rex ended up becoming very close until Rex's untimely death in 1994.

Though the much younger Cricket Blair (Lauralee Bell), now using her given name, Christine, had been thought a mere kid in Danny's eyes, the two began to date; and, as fate would have it, soon fell deeply in love. Cricket's recently widowed best friend, Nina Chancellor (Tricia Cast), was, at this time, being pursued romantically by David Kimble (Michael Corbett). Danny and Christine became convinced that Kimble was a gold digger and after Nina's residual inheritance. The two tried to disrupt the relationship; and, in consequence, David set up Danny to be arrested on false charges of cocaine possession. The conspiracy was exposed during his trial and Danny was thus acquitted; David however was never implicated in the crime. In 1990, Danny and Christine were married in a lavish Hawaiian wedding and honeymoon where Nina and David stood up for them.

In 1991, David Kimble redoubled his efforts to get his slimy hands on Nina's fortune. In the midst of a masquerade ball, and while disguised in a costume similar to that of Danny Romalotti's, David attempted to murder both Christine and Nina. Genoa City Detective Paul Williams (Doug Davidson) foiled the plan in time to save the two. Later, as Paul pursued and ultimately closed in upon David Kimble, a nearly cornered Kimble escaped down an industrial garbage chute, landing almost Lucas-like into a trash compactor. Attempting to climb out, he inadvertently started the compacting action; and it was there, with Christine and Danny looking on, that Kimble was smooshed to death.

Life, such that it was for the young couple, soon found Danny and his bride Christine living a happy young married life—Christine discovering notoriety and success as a prominent trial attorney, and Danny, whilst on the road, touring, finding an altogether different kind of fame for his increasingly popular music. Over time, Christine's boss, Michael Baldwin (Christian LeBlanc) became obsessed with Christine; his unwanted attention leading to accusations of sexual harassment. Chris filed charges against Michael who was ultimately fired from the firm. He quickly married Hilary Lancaster in 1992. Michael was soon working for another competing law firm. He arranged for a woman named Rebecca to pose for photos with a drugged Danny. He used the photos in his trial to insinuate that Christine made the advances since Danny was cheating on her. Christine got Hilary to testify against Michael; he was found guilty, and he was censured by the State Supreme Court.

Danny temporarily left town to appear on Broadway in Joseph and the Amazing Technicolor Dreamcoat, as did Michael Damian in real life. The show was renewed, causing Danny to stay away much too long. His marriage to Christine began to suffer, and she began to spend more time with Paul Williams. While in New York, Danny was stalked by Phyllis Summers (Michelle Stafford), an obsessed fan. She drugged him, got him into her bed, and then she claimed to be pregnant with his child. Danny divorced Christine in 1994, and he married Phyllis to do right by the child. Once Danny realized how manipulative his new wife was, he divorced her in 1996.

Danny began to see Phyllis in a new light after their son, Daniel Romalotti, Jr., contracted bacterial meningitis. Danny then remarried Phyllis in 1997, and Christine and Paul stood up for them. Christine and Paul planted enough doubt in Danny's mind that he ordered a paternity test on his "son". Danny was devastated to discover that Daniel Jr.'s father was really Brian Hamilton, a fling of Phyllis' from her past. She had set Danny up the entire time. However, Danny was Daniel's legal father on his birth certificate, and he still had parental rights. A vicious divorce and custody battle ensued; Christine was Danny's lawyer, and the recently paroled Michael Baldwin served as Phyllis' lawyer. Shortly after, Phyllis and Michael began a wild affair. With the help of Brian Hamilton, all of Phyllis's lies and manipulations were brought out in court – including the fact that Phyllis drugged Danny, and she tricked him into thinking they had sex, which was also false. The court found Phyllis to be unstable and an unfit mother. Danny won custody of Daniel, and Phyllis was allowed visitation rights.

Just as Paul and Christine were about to be married, Danny decided that he wanted her back. He got Christine to reminisce with him about their past, and Paul walked in on the two of them making love. Paul forgave Christine, but he and Danny began a contest for Christine's love, pressuring her to make a decision. Before she could make up her mind, Danny was attacked by a mugger, and he received major kidney damage; he needed a transplant to survive. His sister, Gina, as well as Paul, Phyllis and Christine were all ruled out as possible donors; things began to look bleak. In a last-ditch effort to prove to Christine that he was a changed man, Michael Baldwin came to the rescue, and he donated his kidney to Danny. After Danny's recovery, Chris made her decision, and she chose Paul. Soon after in 1998, Danny left with toddler Daniel for a European tour as a rock star. Before leaving, Danny coerced Phyllis into agreeing that it was not in Daniel's best interest for Phyllis to stay in contact with them.

=== Guest appearances ===
In 2003, Danny returned to Genoa City to lend moral support to his sister. He helped her get her life back together after the devastating loss of her restaurant by arson. Of course, the first person he visited after his return was Christine, who was once again separated from Paul. Still, Christine still harbored some romantic feelings for him. Soon after, Danny ran into Phyllis. He refused to give her any information on Daniel, who was still in boarding school. It was revealed that while Phyllis spent years pining for the child who was taken from her, Daniel grew up in a Swiss boarding school. Danny seldom saw Daniel, and he never told him that he was not his real father. Whenever Phyllis inquired about Daniel to Gina, she was given the cold shoulder. She was not even allowed to see any pictures of her son.

In 2004, Daniel returned to Genoa City as 16-year-old with raging hormones. He came home to visit his father for spring break. Phyllis heard that he was coming home, and she was desperate to get to know her son again. Danny and Christine told Phyllis to wait until they informed Daniel about his mother. Meanwhile, Daniel was befriended by Colleen Carlton (then portrayed by Lyndsy Fonseca), Lily Winters (Christel Khalil) and their friends. Phyllis ran into Daniel at the Crimson Lights coffeehouse; she realized who he was, and she began to talk to him. She told Daniel that she was his mother, and eventually, he asked her to tell him the truth about his family. Once Daniel discovered that Danny was not his biological father, he took off to confront him and Christine, who had resumed their romance. Daniel then decided that he should move in with his mother so they could get to know each other. Unable to find a suitable apartment, Phyllis and Daniel moved into Victoria Newman's (Heather Tom) house on the Newman Ranch. After being exposed as a neglectful parent who dumped his son in boarding school, Danny left Genoa City and went back on tour in 2004.

Through a tragic turn of events, Daniel Jr. was charged with vehicular manslaughter in the death of Cassie Newman (Camryn Grimes), and Christine represented him in court. Both Christine and Phyllis contacted Danny about Daniel's legal problems. Daniel and his new love, Lily Winters, then went on the run together. After hearing about Daniel's problem, Danny decided to stay in Los Angeles in case Daniel and Lily came to him. They did turn up in Los Angeles, and they befriended Danny's musician friend, Brendan. Daniel began having dreams with flashes of the accident, and he finally realized that Cassie was driving the car, not him. Meanwhile, Brendan returned to his home to find Phyllis, Cassie's father, Nick Newman (Joshua Morrow) and Lily's father, Neil Winters (Kristoff St. John) waiting for him. They turned Lily and Daniel over to the police, and both were returned to Genoa City. Lily was released on bail, but Daniel went on trial for vehicular manslaughter, where Christine and Paul Williams failed to prove that Cassie was driving the car. Daniel talked to Danny by phone, and he begged him to stay away. In the end, Cassie's father brought forth evidence to prove Daniel's innocence, and he was acquitted of all charges. Lily was subsequently sent to boarding school as punishment, and she and Daniel were separated.

In 2008, Danny returned to Genoa City to appear at the opening party for Phyllis' new magazine and webzine venture, Restless Style. Danny returned as a favor to Phyllis and to apologize to Daniel for lying to him about his paternity. Soon after, Danny left for the road again. Later in 2008, Daniel was involved with a new woman, Amber Moore (Adrienne Frantz). Just as they were about to get married, Danny made a surprise visit to Genoa City, and he asked Daniel to go on the road with him as tour photographer for six months. Daniel accepted his offer, and the two left Genoa City together. In late 2008, Danny returned to Genoa City to attend the funeral of his stepmother, Katherine Chancellor (Jeanne Cooper). In reality, she was not dead. A woman posing as Katherine, Marge Cotrooke, was really the one who had died. Danny mentioned that it was like a reunion tour seeing Daniel Jr., Gina and Nina Webster. Paul then told Danny that Christine was away in Europe, and she could not attend the services. Among the bequests in Katherine's will, both Danny and Gina each received one-half of one percent of the huge estate in cash. Since Katherine was proven to be alive, their inheritance was short-lived. After the funeral, Danny returned to his home in Malibu, California, where he currently resides.

Danny reappeared in May 2012 when Daniel arrives at one of his concerts with Lucy, Daniel's daughter and Danny's granddaughter, when Daniel asks Danny how he handled being with Phyllis just to be a father to Daniel. Danny returns to Genoa City at the same time as Christine; they have an affair, he offers for her to move to California with him, but she rejects. Later on, Danny meets his new daughter-in-law, Daisy. He returned several months later to attend Phyllis' trial for running over Christine and Paul Williams (Doug Davidson) with her car, however, the trial was called off by the judge and Danny left Genoa City again soon after. When Christine and Paul began dating again, Christine made an unseen visit to California to end any possible relationship she had with Danny.

In September 2013, Danny returned to Genoa City for the memorial service of his stepmother, Katherine Chancellor.

== Reception ==
In 2022, Charlie Mason from Soaps She Knows placed Danny 24th on his list of the best 25 characters from The Young and the Restless, writing, "Rock on? Don't mind if we do! Michael Damian's character was exactly the sort of larger-than-life character that turned viewers of The Young and the Restless into The Enraptured and Addicted."
