= Marguerite Ray =

American television actress

- Born: March 18, 1931; New Orleans, Louisiana, U.S.
- Died: November 18, 2020 (aged 89); Los Angeles, California, U.S.
- Occupation: Actress
- Years active: 1953-2002

Marguerite Ray (born March 18, 1931 – died November 18, 2020) was an American television actress, known for originating the role of Mamie Johnson in the soap opera The Young and the Restless; she was the first Black regular on the show. In a career that lasted from the 1960s until 2001, she also appeared in Sanford and had a recurring role in Dynasty.

== Biography ==
Ray was born March 18, 1931, in New Orleans, to African American parents, Walter Ray, Sr. and his spouse Jeannette. She had two sisters, Verna (Peters) and Jacqueline (Jackson), and four brothers, Walter, Jr., Ronald, Henry, and Burt. She attended the University of California, Berkeley, gaining a degree in Recreation and Theatre Arts. She started acting in television in the 1960s, gaining a regular part in Sanford (1980–81), playing a widow who is the girlfriend of the lead. She originated the role of Mamie Johnson in the soap opera The Young and the Restless, playing the character from 1980 to 1990. She was the first Black regular on the show, which was the soap opera with the highest ratings among African-American viewers in 1988.

She had a recurring role in Dynasty (1989), and her many other television credits include roles in Bewitched, The Bill Cosby Show, The Odd Couple, Quincy, M.E., The Rockford Files and Ironside. Ray also had minor roles in films including Blood's Way (1973), Cheech and Chong's Next Movie (1980) and To Sleep with Anger (1990). Her final television appearance was in 2001.

She died on November 18, 2020, in Los Angeles.

In June 2021, Ray was misidentified during the "In Memoriam" segment of the Daytime Emmy Awards for living actress Veronica Redd. The Daytime Emmys released a statement apologizing for the mistake.

== See also ==
- List of The Young and the Restless characters
