= Cole Howard =

Fictional character from the soap opera The Young and the Restless

- The Young and the Restless character
- J. Eddie Peck as Cole Howard
- Portrayed by: N.P. Schoch (1980–1981); J. Eddie Peck (1993–2025)
- Duration: 1980–1981; 1993–1999; 2023–2025
- First appearance: September 1980
- Last appearance: July 3, 2025
- Created by: William J. Bell
- Introduced by: John Conboy (1980); Edward J. Scott (1993); Josh Griffith (2023)
In-universe information
- Other names: Charles Victor Howard
- Occupation: Professor at Oxford University; Novelist; Ranch hand
- Parents: Rick Daros; Eve Howard
- Spouse: Victoria Newman (1993–1994, 1994–1998); Ashley Abbott (1998–1999)
- Children: Claire Newman
- Aunts: Jordan Howard

Cole Howard was a fictional character from The Young and the Restless, an American soap opera on the CBS network. The role was originated by N.P. Schoch in 1980 and was dropped in 1981, before being brought back and portrayed by J. Eddie Peck from April 2, 1993, to November 16, 1999. On November 21, 2023, Peck reprised the role. On July 3, 2025, he exited the role when his character was killed off, a victim of Legionnaires' disease.

== Storylines ==
Cole is the son of the late Eve Howard, who thought Victor Newman fathered her son from an affair they had when she worked as his secretary while he was married to his first wife, Julia Newman. In 1980, Cole (then named Charles) was seen as a child on a recurring basis as Victor provided a trust fund in his name.

After Victoria Newman divorced Ryan McNeil, Victoria set her sights on the new ranch hand, Cole Howard. When Victoria's father, Victor, was presumed dead in a car accident, Cole offered his support to Victoria's grieving mother, Nikki Abbott. Victoria, unaware of Cole's friendship with Nikki, told him she wanted to sleep with him. Cole turned her down and began an affair with Nikki. When Victoria found out about this, she told Cole that she loved him. Cole then wrote to his mother, Eve, informing her that he had fallen for Victor's daughter. Unbeknownst to Cole, Eve had had an affair with Victor years ago, and had been keeping a secret from him: Cole was Victor's son. Distraught that her son was romantically involved with his half-sister, Eve rushed to Genoa City, determined to stop their wedding. However, before she could tell her son the truth, she suffered a massive stroke that left her in a coma. Cole and Victoria eloped to Las Vegas.

When they returned, Victor and Nikki were horrified that Cole and Victoria had wed. Victor told Cole that he was his father, forcing Cole and Victoria to annul the marriage. It was soon revealed that Victor in fact wasn't Cole's father after all, and Cole and Victoria remarried. They had a daughter they named Eve Nicole Howard, who died several days after birth.

Apart from some minor problems, and Cole's brief flirtation with Nina, Cole and Victoria's marriage remained strong for the next three years. While Victoria was out of town for a while, Cole developed an attraction to Ashley Abbott. The two shared a few kisses at work. When Victoria returned, she was shocked to see Cole and Ashley kissing through the window. She left Cole and moved back in with Nikki, who had separated from Victor. Victoria and Ashley began to compete for Cole's affection, with Ashley ultimately winning.

After divorcing Victoria, Cole married Ashley. When Ashley went to Paris on a business trip later that year, Victoria began trying to seduce Cole, which was unsuccessful. When Ashley returned, she began pressuring Cole to have a child with her. Cole wasn't interested, so he accepted a teaching position in England and divorced Ashley.

Years later, Cole returns to Oregon after being lured by his aunt Jordan and his newly discovered presumed dead daughter Eve Nicole, now known as Claire Grace, in order to get revenge on him and the Newmans, whom they blamed for the death of his mother. Jordan told Cole and Victoria after her sister's death, she sought revenge on them by stealing baby Eve after she was born and switched her with another child that died on the same day. After Jordan escaped and Claire was arrested, Cole and Victoria visited Claire in jail and recognized the signs of brainwashing by Jordan and hired Michael Baldwin to represent her in order to get her into treatment. Later, Cole sneaks back into the house to get a few items in order to provide a DNA test to prove Jordan's claims. Later, at the Newman Ranch in front of Victoria, Michael, Victor and Nikki, Cole received the DNA test results from his cell phone that proved 97.8 percent that Claire is his and Victoria's daughter. Later, Victoria and Cole decide to try to get to know their newfound daughter, while Claire was sent to the psychiatric ward at Genoa Memorial Hospital. Claire at first decides to push them away out of guilt, but slowly starts to develop a bond with both of them. Claire later asked them if she could visit Jordan in prison in order to get closure. They agreed, with Claire taking Victoria and Cole with them. After her confrontation with Jordan, Claire cuts ties with her, and later follows her parents out of prison. After Jordan escapes prison after setting the place on fire, Cole and Victoria visit Claire in the hospital to inform her of her aunt's escape from prison. Victor had ordered Michael to release Claire from the hospital and into the custody of her parents in order to plan a trip for Jordan, who began a revenge plot against the family.

== Reception ==
In 2023, Curtis Harding from Soaps.com wrote that "you'd have expected Cole to turn out a bad seed himself" due to being the son of "obsessive" Eve and "psychotic Rick Daros", and called Cole a "pretty decent guy". He also expressed his excitement in seeing what Cole had been up to in his years away, in addition to how Victoria and Ashley would "react".
