= Veronica Redd =

American actress (born 1948)

- Born: August 8, 1948 (age 78); Washington, D.C., U.S.
- Occupations: Actress, acting coach
- Years active: 1977–2005, 2023–present
- Children: Marion Henderson

Veronica Redd (born August 8, 1948) is an American actress, known for her role as Mamie Johnson in the CBS daytime soap opera, The Young and the Restless.

== Life and career ==
Redd was born in Washington, D.C. In her first Hollywood acting role and TV series appearance, Redd appeared on the CBS-TV sitcom The Jeffersons playing Edith "Edie" Stokes (George Jefferson's old Navy buddy former best friend) who has transitioned to George's disbelief initially, before he slowly accepted her in the Season 4 episode titled "Once a Friend". The following years, she guest-starred on Good Times, Eight Is Enough, Lou Grant, Hill Street Blues, WKRP in Cincinnati and Diff'rent Strokes. Redd starred in the 1982 CBS miniseries The Blue and the Gray set during the American Civil War. She later co-starred in The Atlanta Child Murders (1985) and The Women of Brewster Place (1989). Her film credits include Clean and Sober (1988), The Five Heartbeats (1991) and Blue Hill Avenue (2001).

Redd played the character of Mamie Johnson on The Young and the Restless. She is the second actress to play the role, having taken over from Marguerite Ray. Redd played the role from 1990 to 1995, and again from 1999 to 2004. She was the show's first contract African-American character. She returned to role in 2023 in celebration of its 50th anniversary.

The Y&R recently confirmed that actress Veronica Redd will reprise her role as Mamie Johnson, The Abbott Family's beloved ex-nanny.

== Selected filmography ==
- Blue Hill Avenue - Nana (2001)
- The Five Heartbeats - Mrs. Matthews (1991)
- Clean and Sober - Head Nurse (Detox) (1988)
- Picket Fences - Dairy Queen - Dr. Rizzo (Billed as Veronica Redd Forrest) (1993)
- The Young and the Restless - Mamie Johnson #2 (1990–1995, 1999–2004, 2023-present)
- Small Wonder - Ms. Findlay (1986)
- Johnnie Mae Gibson: FBI - Momma Melden (1986)
- The Blue and the Gray (miniseries) - Hattie (1982)
- WKRP in Cincinnati (TV series) -Cora Isley (1981)
- Diff'rent Strokes - The Magician - Ms. Buxton (1981)
- Good Times - Willona's New Job - Mavis (1978)
- The Jeffersons (TV series) - Edie Stokes (1977)
