= John Abbott (The Young and the Restless) =

- The Young and the Restless character
- Jerry Douglas as John Abbott
- Portrayed by: Sean Garrison (1980); Brett Halsey (1981–1982); Jerry Douglas (1982–2016); Jason Thompson (2017); Jonathan Stoddard (2018–2020)
- Duration: 1980–2013; 2015–2020
- First appearance: May 13, 1980
- Last appearance: October 16, 2020
- Created by: William J. Bell
In-universe information
- Other names: John Robert Abbott, Sr.
- Occupation: Businessman
- Parents: Robert Abbott
- Siblings: Ivan Abbott
- Spouse: Dina Mergeron (1950–1972); Jill Abbott (1982–1986, 1993–1996); Jessica Blair Grainger (1988–1989); Gloria Abbott Bardwell (2004–2005, 2005–2006)
- Children: Jack Abbott; Ashley Abbott (legal); Traci Abbott; Billy Abbott
- Grandchildren: Keemo Volien Abbott; John Abbott III; Kyle Abbott; Colleen Carlton; Abby Newman; Johnny Abbott; Delia Abbott; Katie Newman; Allie Nguyen (great); Harrison Abbott (great); Dominic Philip Newman Abbott Chancellor (great)

John Abbott is a fictional character from the American CBS Daytime soap opera, The Young and the Restless. He was the patriarch of the Abbott family, one of the core families introduced to the series in 1980. After a brief portrayal by Brett Halsey, the role was portrayed by Jerry Douglas. After the character's onscreen death, Douglas has continued in the role as a hallucination to various other characters. John's children are Jack, Traci, Ashley, and Billy Abbott.

== Casting and conception ==
The role was originated briefly by Sean Garrison on May 13, 1980, then by Brett Halsey from March 9, 1981, until March 1, 1982. Then, Jerry Douglas took over the role on April 7, 1982. When John died in 2006, Douglas was only out of work for a few months. Maria Arena Bell, the head writer for the series, brought him back as a recurring guest star on September 1, 2006. Since John's death, Douglas has portrayed the role of John Abbott's spirit, and he appears to his children and friends in times of great need. In 2008, Douglas portrayed the role of Alistair Wallingford on the series for three months.

Following Alistair's departure, Douglas still returns on occasion as Jack's inner conscience. He has also appeared to Ashley on occasion.

== Development ==
Following the death of Douglas in 2021, the soap opera aired a special episode focused on John on June 22, 2023, which featured Douglas' widow Kym Douglas portraying Zelda Wilford, the agent of Traci who gives her advice on how to bring her family back together.

== Storylines ==
=== 1980–1999 ===
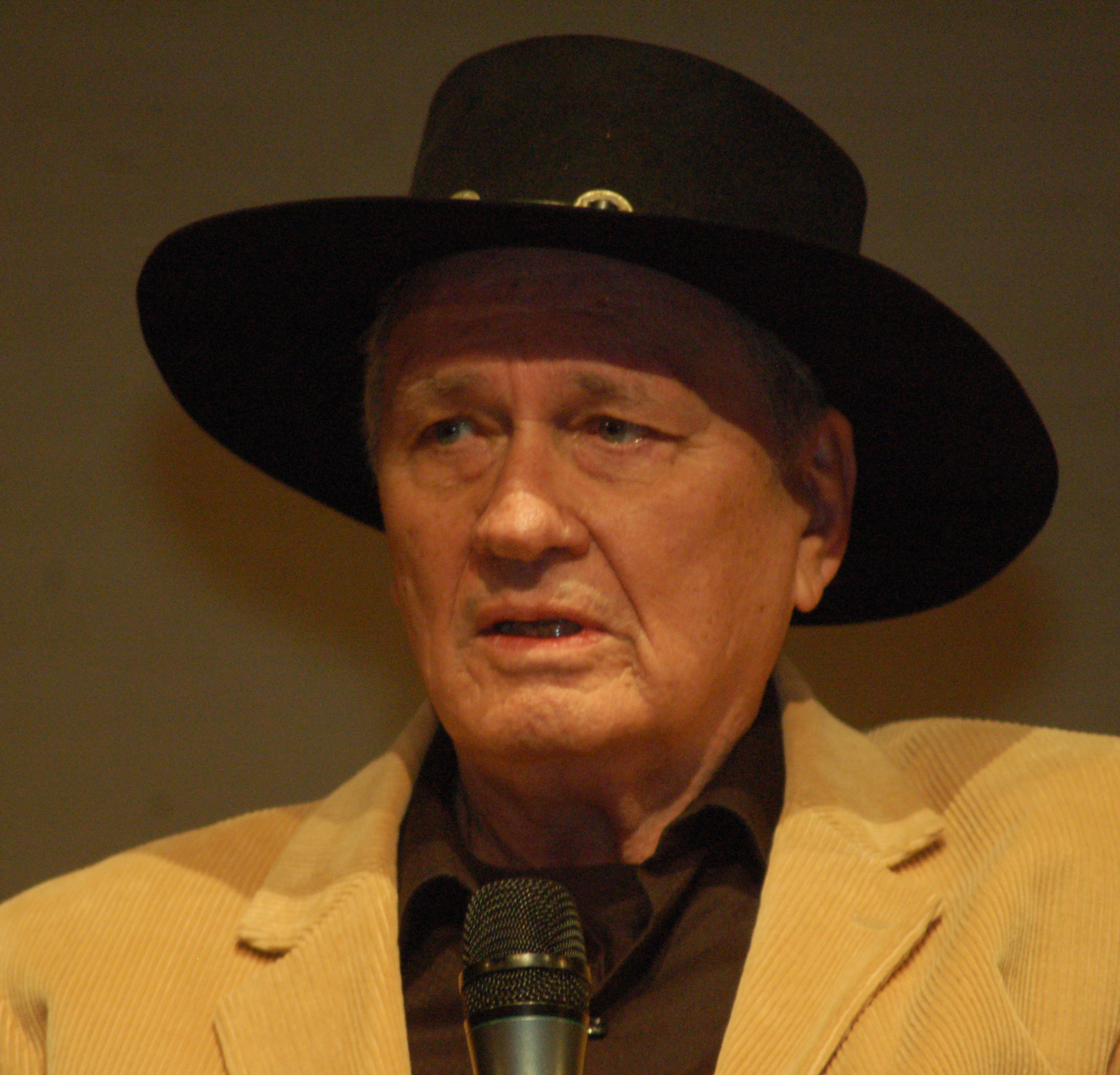
Brett Halsey (pictured, 2011) was the second actor to portray John Abbott

In 1980, John Abbott was introduced as the founder of Genoa City conglomerate, Jabot Cosmetics. He went to high school with his first wife, Dina Mergeron, as well as other prominent Genoa City residents: Stuart Brooks, Neil Fenmore, Katherine Shepherd, Joanna Manning, Gary Reynolds, and Suzanne Lynch, who Ashley's middle name came from. In 1972, Dina left John to raise their three children: Jack, Ashley, and Traci, with their maid, Mamie Johnson, helping. Ashley discovered in 1982 that Dina had been unfaithful and that Brent Davis was her biological father. Jack graduated from Harvard University and, along with Ashley, who graduated from Colorado State University, prepared to one day take over their family company. Traci graduated from Stanford University and became a best-selling novelist.

John continued to run Jabot, but he often butted heads with Jack over business deals. By the early 1980s, John began dating the much younger Jill Foster, but Jack tried to convince his father to stay away from her given her past marriages to Phillip Chancellor II and Stuart Brooks. Yet, Jack ended up having an affair with Jill, and when John found them she immediately wanted to end their relationship. Even Jack decided to stay away from Jill, who in turn launched a sexual harassment lawsuit where she was awarded $10,000. By 1982, John and Jill finally reunite and marry despite Jack and Katherine's pleas against it.

Mamie Johnson also tried to keep an eye on Jill, who quickly began another affair with Jack despite his romances with Diane Jenkins and his marriage to Patty Williams. Eventually, Katherine obtained pictures of Jill with Jack. Upon seeing the photos, John had a stroke. In 1986, John and Jill divorced, and John fired Jack and threw him out of his house. Jill received 25% of Jabot Cosmetics, a seat on the board of directors, and a cushy executive position with Jabot at $150,000 a year. With this huge settlement, John and Jack hoped that Jill would stay quiet in order to protect Jabot's image.

John replaced Jack at the company with Traci's new husband Brad Carlton (Don Diamont), formerly an Abbott gardener. After his divorce from Jill, he began seeing Joanna Manning (Susan Seaforth Hayes), a high school friend and Lauren Fenmore's (Tracey E. Bregman) mother. He soon moved on to the director of the local soup kitchen, Ellen Winters. John put his love life on hold when Ashley disappeared. He found her in a mental institution in New York, and she had amnesia. Thankfully, she quickly recovered, and John brought her back home to Genoa City. Then, Brad quit his job, and John was forced to hire Jack again. John became involved with Jessica Blair Grainger. Jessica was Christine Blair's (Lauralee Bell) mother, who had recently returned to town. Jessica was diagnosed with AIDS, but she kept her illness a secret from everyone, including John. She tried to move back to Kansas City, Missouri, but she collapsed during her travels. Christine discovered her illness, and she told John. Undeterred, the couple still married in 1988 until Christine's father, Jim Grainger, came to town. John nobly ended the marriage in 1989, and Jessica, Jim, and Christine reunited as a family. Jessica died later that year with her loved ones, including John, at her bedside.

Then, Jack decided to take Jabot public, and Victor Newman (Eric Braeden) took over the company. John's shock over this news caused him to have another heart attack. Jack tried to bring Jabot back by ending his romance with Victor's ex-wife Nikki Newman and in turn, Victor would let the Abbotts regain control of Jabot. However, Victor had tricked Jack and he remained in control of Jabot. Out of spite, Jack married Nikki. Victor had also managed a short time afterwards to have a romance with John's ex-wife Jill.

Then, Jill and John reunited when she was rejected by Victor Newman. They remarried in 1993, and Jill wanted to have a baby. Still, John complained that he was too old to be a father. She managed to get pregnant before John had a secret vasectomy. John wanted Jill to have an abortion, but she refused. Thus, William Foster Abbott was born in 1993. John thought that Victor might be Billy's father, but when he found out that Billy was his biological son, he grew to love him. Then, Jill had an affair with Jed Sanders due to John's impotence. As Jill and John separated, John's first wife, Dina, returned to Genoa City and John began romancing her again. John eventually proposed and filed a divorce from Jill. Stress from the divorce and the custody battle over Billy gave John a stroke, but he quickly recovered. Dina left Genoa City again much to John, Jack, Ashley, and Traci's surprise. John eventually won custody of Billy and moved to New York where Billy attended boarding school. Jack and Ashley ran Jabot while their father was raising Billy. John returned to Genoa City with a 16-year-old Billy in 1999. He returned to help Jack and Ashley fight to maintain control of Jabot.

=== 1999–2006 ===
While in town, John began dating his old friend, Gina Roma (Patty Weaver), and he occasionally sang with her at her restaurant, Gina's. Billy graduated high school, and he went to Louisiana for volunteer work. Meanwhile, Traci's daughter, Colleen Carlton (then played by Lyndsy Fonseca), was placed into John's guardianship when she was expelled from school for smoking marijuana in 2001. Colleen began dating J.T. Hellstrom (Thad Luckinbill), but John forbade his granddaughter from seeing J.T., who was much older than she was. Colleen soon began living with her father, Brad Carlton. In 2003, Ashley and Brad were married and expecting a child, but Ashley got into a horrific car accident, and their son, Robert, did not survive. Meanwhile, Gina's restaurant, Gina's, caught on fire, and John watched out for her until she found new employment. Then, John and Ashley scolded Jack for the troubles he brought upon the company. Victor ended up paying Jabot $75 million for his commercial bribery scandal, and Jack was forced to resign.

In 2004, John was lovestruck by the much younger Gloria Fisher (Judith Chapman). He was unaware that her sons were Michael Baldwin (Christian LeBlanc) and Kevin Fisher (Greg Rikaart). Kevin had almost murdered Colleen, and he set Gina's on fire. John and Gloria went on a cruise, and they came back as Mr. and Mrs. John Abbott. Ashley and Jack were shocked by their father's latest romance; Jack accepted Gloria if his father was happy, but Ashley refused to accept her new stepmother. Then, John found out about Gloria's sons, and he vowed to divorce her for deceiving him. Suddenly, he fell down a flight of stairs, and he was forced to have hip replacement surgery. Gloria nursed him back to health, and he forgave her for her deceit. Ashley became the CEO of Jabot, but John fired her when she began working with her on-and-off lover, Victor Newman. John came out of retirement, and he resumed his position as CEO of Jabot until he could find a proper replacement. He settled on making Jill Abbott the new CEO.

In 2004, Ashley was pursued by a mysterious man, Tom Callahan (Roscoe Born). In reality, Tom was Gloria's estranged husband, Tom Fisher, who she never officially divorced. Tom was Kevin's biological father; he was known as "Terrible Tom" because he abused Kevin as a child. Tom eventually cornered Gloria, hoping she would give him money now that she was married to a wealthy Abbott. She tricked John into giving her large sums of money that he thought was being used for Michael's wedding. Michael wanted to tell John the truth, but Tom confessed to him first. In the end, Gloria went along with Tom's lie in order to stay in John's good graces. She continued taking money from John because Tom was blackmailing her. Gloria told John that Tom was dead, but their divorce was never finalized. John forgave Gloria for lying to him, and they "officially" remarried in 2005. Tom wreaked havoc on Michael and Lauren Fenmore's wedding day, and he took Lauren hostage. Gloria was going to meet Tom in order to free Lauren, but John overheard her phone call. He met Tom in an alley, and during their struggle, his gun went off, and Tom was killed. John drove away, and he got into a car accident. At first, he had no recollection of his night, and Ashley confessed to killing Tom. When he remembered, John confessed to killing Tom, and the charges against Ashley were dropped. John was sentenced to seven years in prison for the murder. While John was in prison, Gloria and her sons schemed against the Abbotts. They landed themselves jobs at Jabot, and they sabotaged Ashley and Jack's business plans.

Then, John began fighting with his inmates, and he believed that his first wife, Dina, had just left him. A doctor examined him, and Jack, Ashley and Gloria found out that John was being overmedicated. Jack wanted to trick his father into changing his will to remove Gloria. He made John believe that he was cutting Dina out of the will. Six months after his incarceration, John was due to be pardoned by the Governor. Before his release, he had a stroke, and he was left in a vegetative state. John signed a DNR, and Gloria and her stepchildren agreed that they wanted to abide by John's wishes. John's family and friends came to the hospital to say good-bye, and John died in 2006. Jack and Ashley overruled Gloria's wish to have a lavish funeral. Instead, they told her the wrong time for the ceremony, and they held a small family-only memorial for John. Then, Kevin discovered that his mother was tricked, and he held another service for John with his mother. After his death, the Abbotts were appalled to discover that Gloria was left 50% of John's billion-dollar estate. The remaining 50% was to be divided among John's four children. While Gloria was expecting a big payout, she was stunned when a prison chaplain arrived in court, and he handed the judge a handwritten note by John that wrote Gloria out of his will. In addition, news broke that Gloria's marriage to John was invalid because she never officially divorced Tom. Gloria returned "home" to the Abbott Mansion to find her belongings in trash bags outside while Jack looked on smugly from behind the door. In 2007, the judge made it official that Gloria was not included in John's final will.

John's youngest son Billy would later have a son, John Robert "Johnny" Abbott IV named in honor of Billy's late father, John Abbott.

=== Afterlife appearances ===
John has occasionally appeared as a viewable representation of Jack's conscience. He has often berated Jack for his shabby treatment of Gloria and his unethical behavior, but always reminds him of how much he loves him. While John's spirit has occasionally manifested in ways that could indicate a supernatural origin, he has never known about Gloria's various misdeeds until Jack found out about them. Thus, the "spirit" is nothing more than a figment of Jack's imagination, appearing as his conscience, rather than a supernatural presence. Ashley, Billy and Katherine Chancellor have had similar visits from John's "spirit."

On December 24, 2013, Jack looks at photos of Phyllis, who is now in a coma. John appears. He tells Jack he needs to be with someone who can take care of him - Phyllis wouldn't want to see him home alone talking to a ghost. Jack tells him he's right, but first he has to do something. He calls Phyllis to chat to her. This is the last appearance of John until the episode aired on March 24, 2015.

John appeared to Ashley in December 2015, when she passed out due to her brain aneurysms. John appeared to Jack in September and October 2016, to tell Jack to forgive Billy and Phyllis for their affair.
