= Kate Linder =

American actress (born 1947)

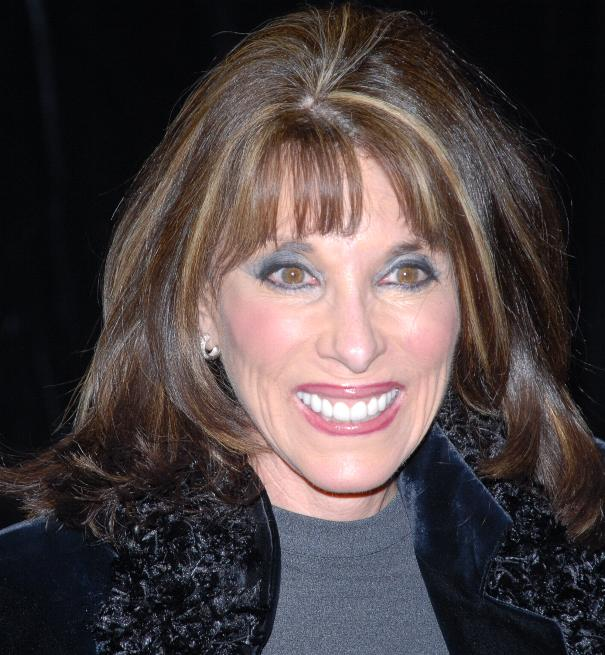
- Linder at a fashion show in 2008
- Born: November 2, 1947 (age 78); Pasadena, California, U.S.
- Occupations: Actress; flight attendant
- Years active: 1973–present
- Spouse: Ronald L. Linder (m. 1976; death 2017)
- Children: 3 stepchildren

Kate Linder (born November 2, 1947) is an American actress, best known for her role as Esther Valentine on The Young and the Restless, which she has played since 1982. After appearing in the soap opera for more than 40 years, she is one of the longest serving actors on an American soap opera. Linder received a star on the Hollywood Walk of Fame in 2008, and was honored at The Hollywood Museum in 2022.

== Early life and education ==
Linder was born in Pasadena, California, and graduated with a BA in theatre arts from San Francisco State University. During that time, she also began working as a flight attendant for Transamerica Airlines. After graduation, Linder found work on television, including roles on Archie Bunker's Place and Bay City Blues.

== Career ==
In 1982, she was cast as Esther Valentine on the CBS soap opera The Young and the Restless. It was supposed to be a one day role. Linder has been starring on The Young and the Restless for more than 40 years and is also one of two Daytime Governors at the Academy of Television Arts and Sciences, who present the Emmys. Linder is also the national spokesperson for The ALS Association and is active with TV Cares, ATAS's AIDS fundraising and awareness organization, the Make-a-Wish Foundation, and national spokesperson for March of Dimes Canada's Conductive Education Program.

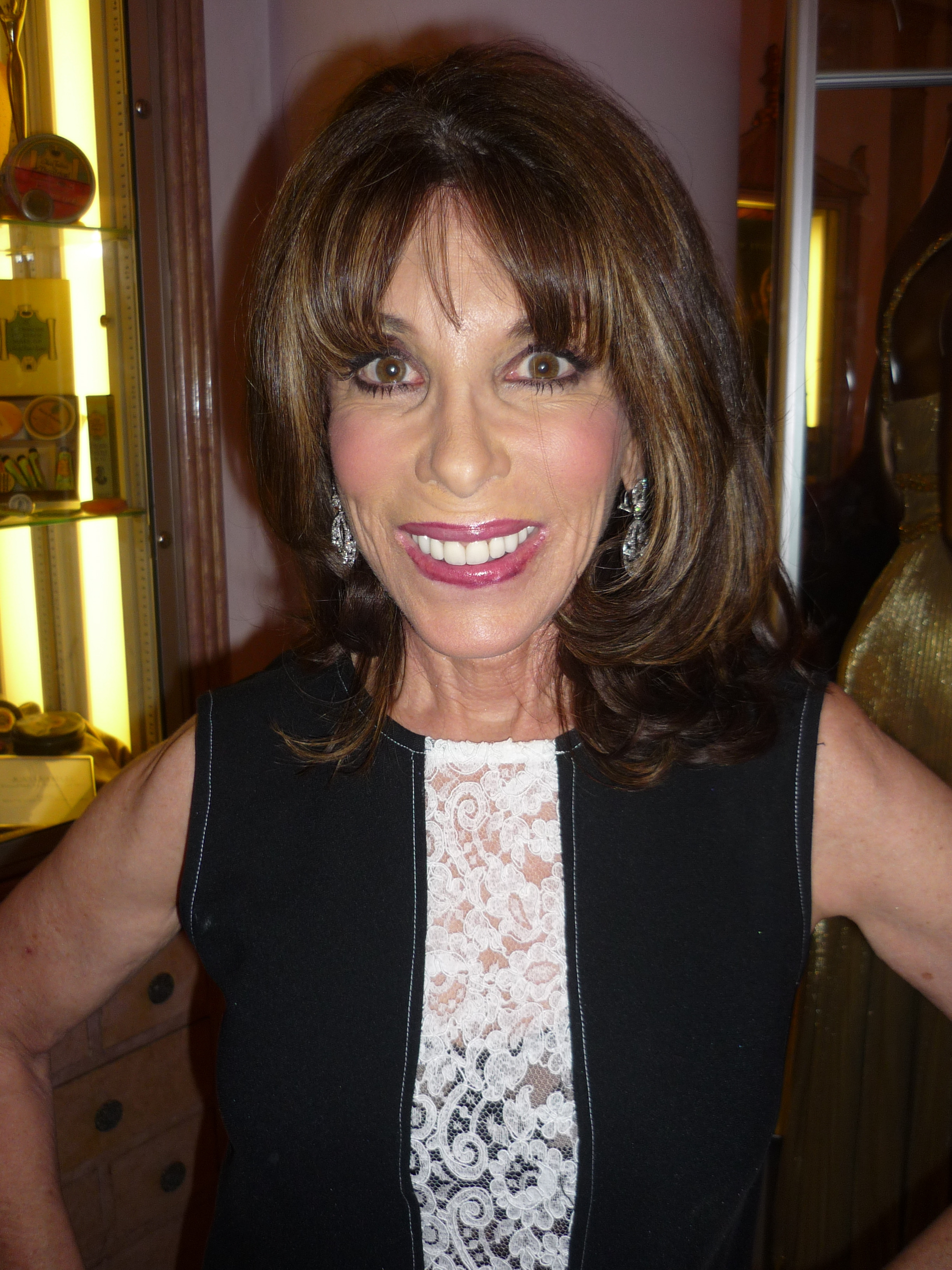
Linder in 2010

For her contributions in television, Linder earned a star on the Hollywood Walk of Fame on April 10, 2008. She is the third actor to earn a star on the Walk of Fame solely on the merits of acting on a soap opera, after Jeanne Cooper in 1993 and Susan Lucci in 2005.

In the 2000s, after 30 years in daytime, Linder made her film debut, starring in a number of independent productions, such as Hysteria and Erased. In 2016, she co-starred with Julia Roberts, Jennifer Aniston, and Kate Hudson in Garry Marshall's final film Mother's Day.

On April 30, 2018, Kate Linder appeared in a 30 minute television interview talk show with Host Ken Boxer on "Ken Boxer Live," taped in Santa Barbara, California.

In 2023, she starred in A Little White Lie, opposite Michael Shannon, Kate Hudson, Zach Braff, and Don Johnson.

In 2025, Kate Linder received a silver circle award from the National Academy of Television Arts & Sciences (NATAS).

In addition to her work on television, Linder serves as a flight attendant for United Airlines, as of 2022.

== Personal life ==
She was married to Dr. Ronald L. Linder for 41 years, from February 14, 1976 (Valentine's Day), until his death from ALS in 2017. She has three stepchildren from his first marriage, Jay, Jon, and Karyn.

== Filmography ==
Year	Title	Role	Notes
1982–present	The Young and the Restless	Esther Valentine	Recurring: 1982–1985, Contract: 1985–present
2005	Cotillion '65	Miss Tiffany	Short film
2006	The Divorce Ceremony	Dr. Valentine	
2007	A Couple of White Chicks at the Hairdresser	Katie Bender	
2009	The Gold & the Beautiful	Gloria Howard	
2010	Lights Out	Jerika Lane	
2011	Hysteria	Lady Cherwell	
2012	Sebastian	Celia Grant	
2012	Erased	Principal Gibbons	
2013	Miracle at Gate 213	Sandrine Simpson	Television film
2014	Miss Meadows	Trudy Navis	
2016	Mother's Day	Gigi	
2016	Better Off Single	Mrs. Staut	
2016	The Charnel House	Aunt Rachel	
2017	Voice from the Stone	LaVecchia	
2018	Dead Love	Caterina	
2019	Act Super Naturally	Rhonda Rooney	
2019	Loners	Senator Difford	
2019–2022	Donna on the Go	Laura Reed	Also producer Nominated — Indie Series Award for Best Lead Actress – Comedy (2020)
2020	Echo Boomers	Kathy Tucker	
2023	A Little White Lie	College President	
2023	The Book of Leah	Aileen Gold	
2023	The Bold and the Beautiful	Esther Valentine	Special Guest - 5 episodes (October 25-31, 2023)
2026	Basic		
