= Jerry Douglas (actor) =

American television and film actor (1932–2021)

- Born: Gerald Rubenstein; November 12, 1932; Chelsea, Massachusetts, U.S.
- Died: November 9, 2021 (aged 88); Los Angeles, California, U.S.
- Occupation: Actor
- Spouses: Arlene Martel (m. 1962; div. 1973); Kymberly Bankier (m. 1985)
- Children: 3

Gerald Rubenstein (November 12, 1932 – November 9, 2021), known professionally as Jerry Douglas, was an American television and film actor. For 25 years, Douglas reigned as patriarch John Abbott in the fictional Genoa City on the daytime television serial The Young and the Restless. In 2006, his character was killed off, but his character later made special appearances.

== Early life ==
Douglas was born as Gerald Rubenstein in Chelsea, Massachusetts, on November 12, 1932, to Russian Jewish immigrants, Rose (Silbert) and William Rubenstein, a junk seller and later mattress manufacturer. His brother was record producer Alan Douglas. He attended Brandeis University and law school in Boston before he dropped out, began auditioning for acting roles and moved to California. There he met his first wife, Arlene Martel, who had a young son by the name of Adam Palmer. They went on to have two children of their own, Avra and Jod.

== Later career ==
In March 2006, after 25 years on the show, Douglas departed The Young and The Restless in a storyline-dictated exit revolving around his character's involvement in the Tom Fisher murder case. Douglas claimed that former headwriter of The Young and The Restless Lynn Marie Latham killed his character off because she could not understand why a man would run a cosmetics company. He continued to recur on the show for the next few months and was put back on contract with the show in June to play his now-deceased character's ghost. He left the show for good on August 18, but continued to make occasional appearances. In March 2008 he began appearing as a new character Alistair Wallingford, a drunken hack actor involved in a gaslighting plot, but was written out a few months later.

In 2007, Douglas released a CD, The Best Is Yet to Come, a collection of jazz standards, and has performed around the United States and Canada.

== Personal life and death ==
Settling in the San Fernando Valley, Douglas sold insurance by day and took acting classes at night. Although he still struggled, he received encouragement after appearing in the play John Brown's Body.

For several years, Douglas appeared on such TV shows as Mission: Impossible and The Feather and Father Gang, often portraying villains. At the same time, Martel decided to move herself and their two children, Avra and Jod, to Carmel. They eventually divorced. He remarried to Kymberly Bankier, whom he met at a Muscular Dystrophy Association event. They were married from April 6, 1985, until his death in 2021, and have a son, Hunter.

Douglas died after a brief illness in Los Angeles, California, on November 9, 2021, three days before his 89th birthday.

== Filmography ==
Year	Title	Role	Notes
1961	Blast of Silence	Gangster #2	
1963	Black Zoo	Perkins - Lab Technician	
1965	Harlow	Minor Role	Uncredited
1967	Gunn	Dave Corwin	
1978	Good Guys Wear Black	Joe Walker - The Black Tigers	
1978	Avalanche	Phil Prentiss	
1979	The Rockford Files	Al	
1981	Mommie Dearest	Radio Interviewer	
1981	Looker	Laxative Spokesman	
1989	Hunter	Michael Murdoch	
1991	JFK	Board Room Man	
1998	The Godson	Freddie Green	
2011	Head Over Spurs in Love	Uncle Billy Bob	
2012	Silent But Deadly	Captain	Final film role
