= Esther Valentine =

Fictional character from The Young and the Restless

- The Young and the Restless character
- Portrayed by: Kate Linder
- Duration: 1982–present
- First appearance: April 8, 1982
- Introduced by: William J. Bell
- Crossover appearances: The Bold and the Beautiful
In-universe information
- Occupation: Housekeeper, personal assistant, residential manager, barista
- Husband: Norman Peterson (1994); Roger Wilkes (2009) (Note: Esther's marriage to Roger Wilkes was invalid, due to him being a bigamist.)
- Daughters: Chloe Mitchell
- Grandsons: Miles Fisher
- Granddaughters: Delia Abbott; Bella Fisher

Esther Valentine is a fictional character from the American CBS Daytime soap opera The Young and the Restless. The role has been portrayed by actress Kate Linder since April 8, 1982. For over three decades, Esther has been known as the long-serving maid, housekeeper and confidant for businesswoman Katherine Chancellor (Jeanne Cooper).

== Casting and character creation ==
Linder was hired to play a "one-day, one-line role". The actress remained on recurring until 1985, when she was offered a contract. In the beginning, the character remained unnamed. Jeanne Cooper, who portrayed Katherine, coined the name "Esther" when she began calling the character that "out of the blue". Linder said: "Then other people started calling me that and the writers picked up on it. That's how Esther was born." A national contest was held to give Esther a surname, the options picked by the public were: "Valentine" and "Diamond", with Linder picking Valentine.

Linder and her character crossed over to The Bold and the Beautiful in a 5-day story arc along with the character of Lauren Fenmore. Linder’s appearances on The Bold and the Beautiful were October 25 to 31, 2023.

Throughout her entire tenure on the soap opera, Linder has continued to work as a flight attendant for United Airlines.

== Character development ==
Linder has described the character of Esther as a "very loyal and very giving person", adding: "She gets run over and people take advantage of her."

== Storylines ==
Esther has served as Y&R's comic relief and has been Katherine Chancellor's (Jeanne Cooper) maid since 1982. She is also a trained alcohol abuse counselor. She had a one night stand with a plumber named "Tiny", with whom she had a daughter, Katherine Tina Valentine, who was only shown a handful of times as a child before emerging as Jabot Cosmetics fashionista, Chloe Mitchell (Elizabeth Hendrickson).

Esther was indirectly responsible for the death of Katherine's husband, Rex Sterling (Quinn Redeker) when she answered a personal ad and met Norman Peterson (Mark Haining), a notorious con man. In an effort to impress Norman, she posed as lady of the manor, and Rex and Katherine went along with it and disguised themselves as her servants. Norman coerced Esther into convincing Katherine to include her in her will and marry him. A suspicious Katherine and Rex arranged a fake wedding. Then, not content to wait for Katherine to die to inherit her riches, Rex caught Norman breaking into the estate safe. Rex was shot and killed in the altercation, leaving Katherine devastated. Norman was then arrested for murder and Esther has since been forgiven and named in Katherine's will. It was later revealed that Chloe Mitchell is her daughter. Esther then started attempting a normal relationship with her, but Chloe/Kate is frequently embarrassed by her mother's status as a maid and her lack of bashfulness regarding the chosen career. At Cane's yearning, they are getting somewhat close again.

On November 20, 2008, at the reading of a presumed-dead Katherine's will, Esther inherited 1/10 of 1 percent of Katherine's 1 billion dollar estate (1 million dollars) as well as Katherine's half-ownership of the Chancellor Estate. Esther was now financially secure for life and can enjoy the life of luxury living in her newly owned mansion. At the same time, Esther went out on a date with Roger Wilkes (David Leisure), with whom she became engaged after only a few dates. Esther seems completely unaware of the fact that Roger is scamming her. Esther and Roger eventually married, but their marriage was declared invalid after it became clear that Roger was in fact a bigamist. It was soon discovered that Katherine was actually alive. Esther now takes great joy in being a grandmother to Chloe's daughter, Delia.

In recent years, Esther has dealt with many losses. First, her longtime boss, Katherine Chancellor died. She left Esther a generous salary with the stipulation that she continue keeping house at the Chancellor Mansion. Shortly thereafter, her granddaughter, Delia was killed in a hit and run by Adam Newman (Michael Muhney, later Justin Hartley and Mark Grossman).

Esther ends up leaving her job at the Chancellor Mansion, unable to deal with Colin, who she claims was making passes at her, though this was never proven. She takes a job as a barista at Crimson Lights under owner Dylan McAvoy.

Jill, realizing how much she misses Esther, hires her back, and she now works as the housekeeper at Chancellor Mansion once again.

== Reception ==
Tommy Garrett of Canyon News praised Linder's portrayal of Esther when the character was grieving over the loss of Katherine Chancellor in 2008. Garrett wrote: "She’s bringing the show the much needed and deserved attention it’s been wanting for months with a role that continues getting better by the day." He added that continually she "amazes" audiences and critics with her performance. In 2019, writers from Soap Opera Digest praised Linder's performance of Esther reuniting with Chloe, which they cited as one of the most memorable performances in American soap operas of 2019.
