= James Michael Gregary =

American actor (born 1953)

- Born: May 20, 1953 (age 73); Baltimore, Maryland, USA
- Occupation: Actor
- Years active: 1989–94, 2009

James Michael Gregary (born May 20, 1953) is a Greek–American actor, best known for playing the recurring role of Clint Radison on the CBS soap opera The Young and the Restless, which he had played from 1989 to 1990, and again briefly in 1991, and returned to the role briefly in early 2009. Between his break from the soap, he had no other TV or movie appearances.

Gregary began his professional career onstage in New York City where he worked with the Light Opera of Manhattan (an Off-Broadway Gilbert and Sullivan repertory company) for almost six years and soon afterwards went on to appear Off-Broadway in the musicals Five After Eight and City of Life. In 1992, he starred in the smash comedy hit Beau Jest at the Lamb's Theatre. He also performed the role of Orin, the dastardly dentist in Little Shop of Horrors.

Besides guest starring on CBS' Legwork in 1987, he appeared on most soaps in New York City at the time, most notably as Art Mueller on Ryan's Hope and Inspector Pappas on As the World Turns. After his initial stint as Clint Radison on Y&R, Gregary appeared on Guiding Light from 1992 to 1994 as Jory Andros, the brother of Eleni Andros, played by Melina Kanakaredes. He also portrayed the role of Ken Fontana briefly on The Bold and the Beautiful in 1991.

His first and only role in movies was in 1989 when he appeared as Selim on The Favorite.

== Career ==
| show | role | year |
|---|---|---|
| The Young and the Restless | Clint Radison | 1989–1991, 2009 |
| Guiding Light | Jory Andros | 1992–1994 |
