= J. Eddie Peck =

American television and film actor (born 1958)

- Born: John Edward Peck; October 10, 1958 (age 68); Lynchburg, Virginia, U.S.
- Occupation: Actor
- Years active: 1985–present
- Height: 6 ft 3 in (1.91 m)
- Spouse: Sonya Zaza (m. 1989)
- Children: 2

John Edward Peck (born October 10, 1958) is an American television and film actor. His roles in TV series include Tommy McKay in Dallas (1989), Howard "Hawk" Hawkin on Days of Our Lives (1991–92), Cole Howard on The Young and the Restless and Jake Martin on All My Children. He also appeared as Lance Apollonaire, a student of Diane Chambers in a college course she was teaching in an episode of Cheers.

== Early life and education ==
He lived in Joplin, Missouri during the 1970s and graduated in 1976 from Joplin Parkwood High School, where he was a member of the varsity tennis team. He attended Missouri Southern State University, where he earned a BA in marketing .

== Work ==
Early in his career, Peck guest-starred on a number of television series, including Diagnosis: Murder, Highway to Heaven, Cheers, Murder, She Wrote and Knight Rider. Peck guest-starred in the ABC Family television series Kyle XY as Adam Baylin in the season finale of season one and certain episodes of season two.

Much of Peck's work has been on both daytime and prime time soap operas. He played Cole Howard on The Young and the Restless from 1993 to 1999 and 2023 to 2025, and he succeeded Michael Lowry in the role of Jake Martin on All My Children, from 2000 to 2003. His other soap credits include Days of Our Lives (1991–1992); Dynasty (1988–1989) and Dallas (1989).

Peck also appeared in the films Dangerously Close, Lambada, To Grandmother's House We Go and Blind Heat, and was one of the hosts of the Miss USA 1998 pageant.

== Filmography ==
Film
Year	Title	Role	Notes
1986	Dangerously Close	Donny Lennox	
1987	Breaking Home Ties	Brad	TV movie
1989	Curse II: The Bite	Clark Newman	
1990	Lambada	Kevin "Blade" Laird	
1992	To Grandmother's House We Go	Eddie Popko	TV movie
2001	Blind Heat	Victor	
2009	Mexican Gold	Pick Randall	Alternative title: Return of the Outlaws
2016	Divorce Texas Style	Quentin Stewart	
TBA	Bright Ideas	Mr. Hall	Post-production

Television
Year	Title	Role	Notes
1985	Wildside	Sutton Hollister	Main cast (6 episodes)
1986	Knight Rider	Erik Whitby	Episode: "Out of the Woods"
1986	Murder, She Wrote	Coby Russell	Episode: "Dead Man's Gold"
1986	Cheers	Lance Apollonaire	Episode: "Knights of the Scimitar"
1987	Highway to Heaven	Richard Davies	Episode: "A Night to Remember"
1988–1989	Dynasty	Roger Grimes	Recurring role (8 episodes)
1989	Dallas	Tommy McKay	Recurring role (13 episodes)
1991	Dark Justice	Danny Sicani	Episode: "Brother Mine"
1991–1992	Days of Our Lives	Howard "Hawk" Hawkins	Unknown episodes
1993–1999, 2023–2025	The Young and the Restless	Cole Howard	Series regular (April 2, 1993-November 16, 1999); Recurring role (November 21, 2023-July 3, 2025)
1995	Diagnosis: Murder	J. Eddie Peck	Episode: "Death in the Daytime"
2000–2003	All My Children	Jake Martin	Main cast (15 episodes)
2006–2008	Kyle XY	Adam Baylin	Recurring role (12 episodes)
2008	Just Jordan	Coach	Episode: "Let Sleeping Dogs Lie"
