= Patty Weaver =

American actress (born 1949)

Patty Weaver is an American actress who played the role of Gina Roma on The Young and the Restless on a contract basis from 1982 until August 2005 when she was dropped to recurring status; she last appeared in 2025.

Weaver was born in Clarksburg, West Virginia. Before her role on The Young and the Restless, Weaver played the role of Trish Clayton Banning on Days of Our Lives from 1974 to 1982.

Before starting to act, Weaver formed a band, The Loved Ones. She has released several albums.

She began her acting career by guest-starring on television series, including Maude and All in the Family, then she began her daytime acting career with a six-year stint on Days of Our Lives. Weaver is active on the night club circuit, and she has opened for Bob Newhart, Don Rickles, Jerry Lewis, and George Burns in Las Vegas and Atlantic City.

She was a regular on some telethons, and she has helped to raise millions of dollars for charities. Weaver lives in Southern California. She divorced her first husband, Larry Stewart, an entertainment-law attorney, when he became physically abusive to her, and a few years later, she married actor Gary Faga. She was married to former Young and the Restless writer Jerry Birn from 1994 until his death in 2009.

== Roles ==
- The Young and the Restless as Gina Roma (1982–2009, 2013, 2023, 2025)
- Days of Our Lives as Trish Clayton Banning (1976–1982)
- Huckleberry Finn as Mary Jane (1975)
- All in the Family (episode "Archie Goes Too Far") as Joanie (27 January 1973)

== Discography ==
=== Studio albums ===
- Feelings (1976)
- Patty Weaver Sings 'As Time Goes By' (1976)
- No One's Ever Seen This Side Of Me (1978)
- Patty Weaver (1982)
- Patty Weaver Sings Christmas: Country and City Favorites (1993)

=== Singles ===
- "Christmas Is..." b/w '"You're All I Want for Christmas" (1976)
- "Shot in the Dark" b/w "Line of Fire" (1982)
- "Don't Want a Heartache (Edit)" b/w "Part Time Man" (1982)
