= Ashley Abbott =

- The Young and the Restless character
- Eileen Davidson as Ashley Abbott
- Portrayed by: Eileen Davidson (1982–1988, 1999–present); Brenda Epperson (1988–1995); Shari Shattuck (1996–1999); Julia D'Arcy Badinger (2018)
- Duration: 1982–present
- First appearance: June 11, 1982
- Created by: William J. Bell
- Introduced by: H. Wesley Kenney (1982); Edward J. Scott (1996, 1999); Bradley Bell (2007); Josh Griffith (2008); Jill Farren Phelps (2013); Anthony Morina and Josh Griffith (2019)
- Crossover appearances: The Bold and the Beautiful
In-universe information
- Other names: Ash, Mrs. Abbott, Belle (alternate personalities); Ashley Suzanne Abbott; Susan Ashley; Annie; Ashley Lassiter; Ashley Newman; Ashley Bladeson; Ashley Howard; Ashley Carlton; Ashley McCall
- Occupation: Businesswoman; Chemist; Socialite
- Father: Brent Davis; John Abbott (legal)
- Mother: Dina Mergeron
- Stepfather: Javier Delgado (1964–1976); Marcel Mergeron (1977–1982)
- Half-brothers: Jack Abbott; Billy Abbott (legal); Eric Vanderway
- Half-sisters: Traci Abbott
- Spouse: Steven Lassiter (1988); Victor Newman (1990–1993, 2009); Blade Bladeson (1994–1995); Cole Howard (1998–1999); Brad Carlton (2000–2006); Tucker McCall (2011–2012, 2023–2024)
- Sons: Robert Carlton
- Daughters: Abby Newman
- Stepsons: Devon Hamilton
- Grandsons: Dominic Abbott Newman Winters Chancellor
- Grandfathers: Robert Abbott
- Uncles: Ivan Abbott
- Nephews: Keemo Volien Abbott; John Abbott III; Kyle Abbott; Johnny Abbott (legal); Theo Vanderway; Harrison Locke (great)
- Nieces: Colleen Carlton; Allie Nguyen (great); Delia Abbott (legal); Katie Abbott (legal); Ruby Spectra-Abbott

Ashley Abbott is a fictional character from The Young and the Restless and The Bold and the Beautiful, two American soap operas on the CBS network. She has been most notably portrayed by Eileen Davidson, who originated the role on June 11, 1982, before departing in 1988. Brenda Epperson portrayed Ashley from 1988 to 1995, before Shari Shattuck portrayed the role for the next three years, until Davidson's return on March 19, 1999. Davidson was nominated in 2003 for Daytime Emmy Award for Outstanding Lead Actress in a Drama Series, and she later won that award in 2018.

The character is the daughter of Dina Mergeron and Brent Davis, although she believed John Abbott was her biological father until she reached adulthood. She has had relationships with various men throughout the years, most notably Steven Lassiter, Victor Newman, Blade Bladeson, Cole Howard and Brad Carlton. She has a daughter with Victor, Abby Newman. She is also known for her business contributions to her father's company, Jabot Cosmetics, much like her brother Jack. In 2006, it was announced that Davidson was to leave The Young and the Restless. She last appeared on January 11, 2007. Shortly after, the character crossed over to its sister soap, The Bold and the Beautiful. There, she became intertwined with the Forresters and Forrester Creations; she also had a romance with Ridge Forrester. She left The Bold and the Beautiful in 2008 and returned to The Young and the Restless, where she has since had relationships with Victor once again and Tucker McCall.

In May 2012, it was announced that Davidson was let go from The Young and the Restless, leading to her exit on August 3, 2012. Davidson initially hadn't known why, but it was reported later that Sony Pictures Television terminated her contract with the show for her to return to Days of Our Lives as Kristen DiMera, a character she had portrayed there over 14 years prior. Davidson made a brief return to The Young and the Restless in March 2013 for the soap's 40th anniversary. After subsequent guest appearances, Davidson returned to The Young and the Restless on September 3, 2014, as a series regular. In 2018, Davidson again exited the role; she returned in March 2019, following the installment of head writer Josh Griffith.

== Casting ==
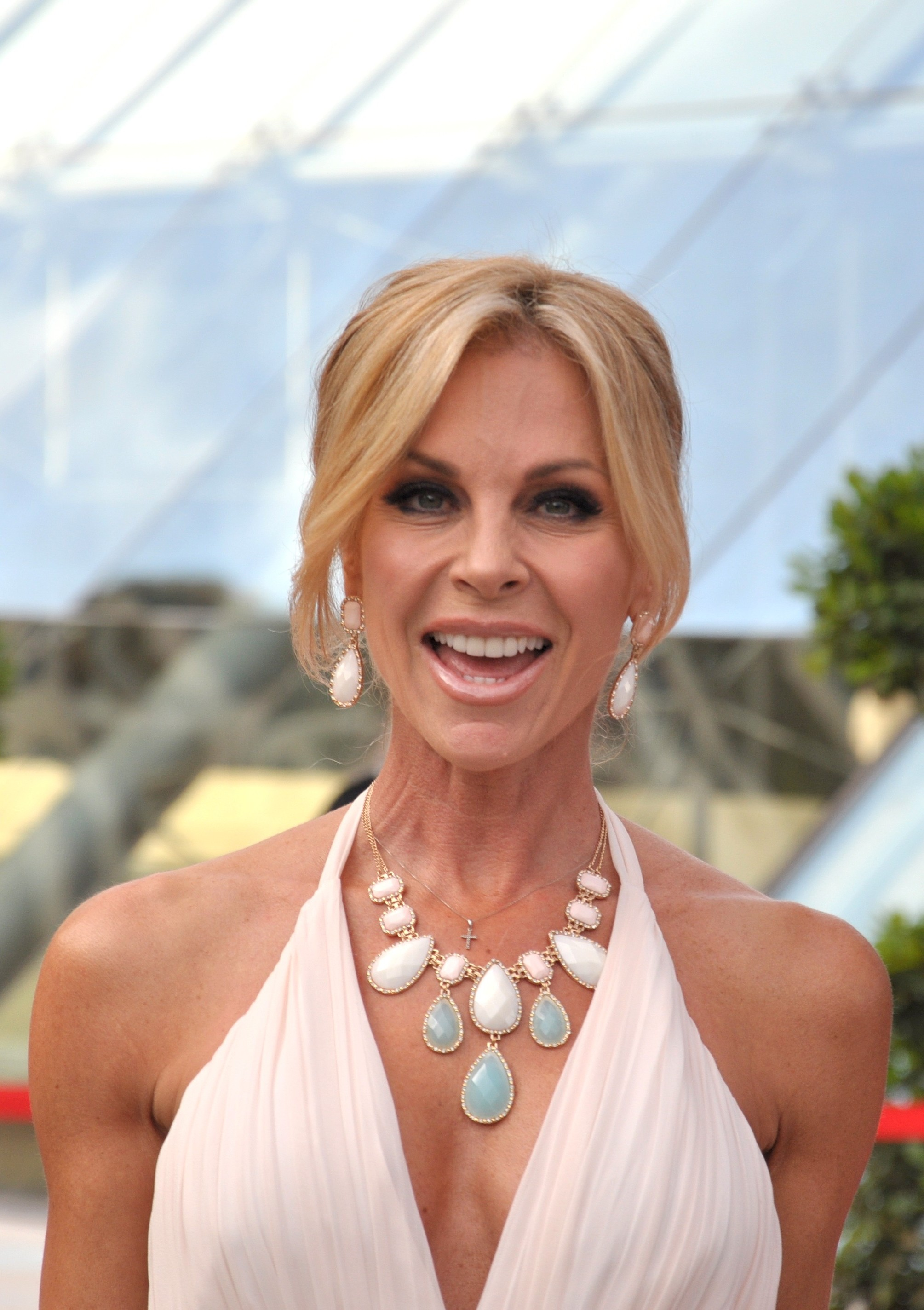
Cindy Ambuehl screen-tested for the character in 1996, opposite Don Diamont (Brad Carlton).

Eileen Davidson originated the role of Ashley Abbott on June 11, 1982, until her first exit on December 2, 1988. The role was immediately recast with Brenda Epperson, who portrayed Ashley for seven years from December 5, 1988, before leaving the role on December 21, 1995. Cindy Ambuehl screen-tested for the character in 1996, but Shari Shattuck assumed the role from March 21, 1996, to February 22, 1999, with Davidson returning on March 19, 1999. Davidson took maternity leave in the summer of 2003. In 2006, news broke that Davidson was to exit the soap opera, and she last aired on January 11, 2007. She then carried the role of Ashley over to the show's sister soap, The Bold and the Beautiful. On September 25, 2008, Davidson returned to The Young and the Restless, and subsequently made one final appearance on The Bold and the Beautiful on November 25 of the same year when Ashley resigned from her position at Forrester Creations.

In May 2012, Davidson informed followers on her Twitter page that she had been let go from The Young and the Restless. Davidson further confirmed she did not know why she was let go, but was seeing the positive light from it. It was then announced by Nelson Branco that Sony Pictures Entertainment wanted Davidson on both The Young and the Restless and Days of Our Lives, but that Y&R would not share the actress, leading to Sony terminating her contract with the soap. Thus it was announced that Davidson would reprise her role as Kristen Blake on the NBC soap. Davidson made her onscreen exit on August 3, 2012. Speaking about her upcoming return to Days and departure from the show with TV Guide, Davidson stated: "What happened to me at Y&R was shocking — I've been in this business a very long time and have never seen anything like it — but it's not like I haven't been fired before." She also went on to say that "I was led to believe that I was fired, though it was a bad news-good news thing — the bad news is Y&R is firing you, the good news is Days wants you." In February 2013, it was announced that Davidson would return to The Young and the Restless for "very special episodes" that would commemorate the show's 40th anniversary, airing on March 18 and 19. In spite of this, the actress remained a part of Days of our Lives full-time.

In August 2013, following the announcement of Davidson's departure from Days of our Lives, it was announced that she would again reprise the role for three episodes airing from October 24 to 28, later returning for a guest appearance on November 27 and December 2, 2013. In June 2014, it was announced that Davidson had signed a two-year contract with The Young and the Restless to appear as a regular cast member again, and would return to the series in September. Davidson also revealed her contract would allow for her to continue making appearances on Days of Our Lives.

In 2018, Julia D'Arcy Badinger portrayed a younger Ashley in flashbacks. That June, Daytime Confidential broke news that Davidson had quit the role. Davidson last appeared in the role on October 29, 2018. On February 25, 2019, Davidson announced she would return to the role for several appearances; first airing on March 29, 2019. Since then, she has remained on the show on a recurring status.

== Character development ==
Davidson describes Ashley as a "dynamic character". She has been characterized as "sassy" yet an "honorable heroine". The Record describes Ashley as "headstrong". She is recognized for her unluckiness and long-term suffering. Davidson stated, "She is a heroine. So often she was being victimized by people and trying to always rise above that, and being driven insane and losing babies, etc." In 1990, The Washington Times described Ashley as a "smart woman", known for her "level head" and "business success". Ashley is dedicated to her work and has a strong sense of family. She is a beloved member of the Genoa City community. Her passion for the family business, Jabot Cosmetics, cost Ashley her marriage to Cole Howard (J. Eddie Peck).

"Ashley has more humor lately. She's lightened up. Not so serious. No reason why a business woman has to be so straight. Better yet, she hasn't lost her femininity

— Brenda Epperson, speaking of Ashley's character (1990)

Ashley has been involved in a number of different romantic relationships over her duration on the series. Her relationship with Brad Carlton (Don Diamont) came as a shock, due to Brad being beneath her socially. Epperson, who played Ashley at the time, was uncertain of Ashley and Brad's decision to get married.

Davidson opined that a storyline in which Victor's son Adam Newman (Michael Muhney) gaslighted a pregnant Ashley in 2009 was payback for Ashley stealing Victor's sperm years ago to conceive Abby. She stated: "I think the character really suffered after she stole Victor's sperm from Diane [...] After that, the viewers lost a lot of respect for Ashley. People wanted Ashley to pay for it. My opinion? Although last summer's gaslighting storyline was used to propel a lot of other stories, it was also about making Ashley pay. Now we can close that entire chapter because Ashley paid. It was Ashley's redemption". Around this story arc, Tommy Garrett of Canyon News described Ashley as a "damsel in distress", stating that she had a "twisted mind" due to suffering a hysterical pregnancy after losing her unborn child at the hands of Adam.

Following the death of John, Jack works desperately to remove his wife Gloria Abbott (Judith Chapman) from the family, even illegally making changes to John's will. Explaining Ashley's ambivalence towards the situation, Davidson stated: "Just because you don't like somebody doesn't mean you should do something illegal [...] The point is, their father loved her. And even if they don't like her, they have to honor what he wanted. Ashley never wanted to do anything that went against her father's wishes." The actress stated that Ashley "just wants" Jack to "do the right thing".

== Storylines ==
Ashley is born on April 29, 1960, to John Abbott, Sr. (Brett Halsey, later Jerry Douglas) and Dina Abbott Mergeron (Marla Adams). Twenty-two years later, after completing college, Ashley returns to Genoa City and applies for a job as a lab chemist at Jabot Cosmetics, the family company, using the name Susan Ashley so she will be hired for her skills, not her family connections. She takes over as president of the company after her brother Jack Abbott (Terry Lester, later Peter Bergman) is shot on his one-year anniversary by his wife, Patty Williams (Andrea Evans) . Ashley commences an unlucky streak of relationships; starting with French artist Eric Garrison, who slept with her mother, and Marc Mergeron, who is revealed to be her former stepbrother. Capitalizing on her unluckiness, it is revealed that Ashley's biological father is Brent Davis, not John Abbott, who remains unaware of Ashley's true paternity. Trauma leads Ashley to become missing with amnesia, where she is found by business tycoon Victor Newman (Eric Braeden), who takes her back to Genoa City. Ashley has an affair with Victor, who is married to Nikki Newman (Melody Thomas Scott). To spite Ashley, Nikki engages in an affair with Jack and tries to have Victor's brother, Matt Miller (Robert Parucha), unsuccessfully seduce Ashley. Ultimately, Victor chooses to be with Ashley, angering Nikki. When Ashley falls pregnant with Victor's child, Nikki is diagnosed with cancer, causing Victor to leave Ashley, who secretly has an abortion. Ashley suffers a mental breakdown, before marrying her psychiatrist Steven Lassiter (Rod Arrants). Steven's former patient Leanna Randolph (Barbara Crampton) stalks the couple and attempts to destroy Ashley. She writes a biography about Victor that exposes information about his dysfunctional relationship with Ashley. Steven is later shot and killed by an unstable patient.

Following a short affair with Brad Carlton (Don Diamont), Ashley marries Victor. The marriage suffers because of Nikki's ongoing problems as well as Victor's daughter Victoria Newman's (Heather Tom) constant schemes to break them up. After her divorce from Victor, Ashley falls in love with Jabot's mysterious photographer Blade Bladeson (Michael Tylo), and they get married. Blade's vengeful twin brother Rick Bladeson arrives in town, holds Blade hostage and impersonates him. Eventually, Ashley and Blade's marriage ends. She then falls romantically for Kurt Costner (Leigh McCloskey), who is shot saving her from muggers. The romance is short-lived, as Kurt leaves Ashley to be with Victor's ex-wife Hope Wilson (Signy Coleman). Ashley engages in an affair with Victoria's husband Cole Howard (J. Eddie Peck), an author who is writing a novel about her life, which requires them to spend time together. Ashley and Victoria compete for Cole, and because of past “issues” with Victoria, Cole decides to divorce Victoria, and proposes to Ashley, who accepts. Afterwards, when Victoria’s pregnancy is revealed, she at first lies and says Cole isn’t the father, but then admits he is. Months later, Victoria delivers a premature baby when she has emergency surgery for a ruptured appendix. Their critically ill baby, Eve Nicole, passes away after a week in NICU. Cole follows through on his plans to marry Ashley. Their marriage suffers a rough patch when Ashley travels to Madrid to help her stepbrother Rafael Delgado (Carlos Bernard), who is dealing with dangerous customers after selling them forged paintings. Cole assumes that she is having an affair with Rafael, unaware of who he is. During this, Victoria attempts to sabotage the marriage. Ultimately, upon Ashley's return to Genoa City, the couple divorce.

By 2000, one of Jack's former lovers and Victor's latest ex-wife, Diane Jenkins (Alex Donnelley) steals Victor's sperm from a sperm bank, though Nikki switches the sample with Jack's sperm. Ashley then steals Victor's sperm and impregnates herself, claiming that the father is a stranger; this was to make up for the abortion she had years prior. She then marries Brad Carlton and gives birth to Abby Carlton, who is raised to believe she is the daughter of Brad. Ashley is diagnosed with breast cancer, and feeling that she may not have time left, she confesses the truth about Abby's paternity to Victor. Brad and Ashley split, though are brought together when she becomes pregnant with their child. Stress over the battle between Jabot and Newman Enterprises causes her to leave town. While she is driving back, she is involved in a car accident, killing the unborn child. Victor is blamed for the child's death. Brad and Ashley's marriage continues to diminish and they are divorced. Tom Fisher (Roscoe Born), the dangerous ex-husband of John's wife Gloria Abbott (Judith Chapman), arrives in town. To protect his family, John shoots and kills Tom. Ashley covers this up by confessing to the crime herself, though John soon confesses himself, and is jailed for seven years. Gloria contaminates Ashley's new line of beauty cream, which causes a woman to die. John suffers a heart attack following his release from prison, and passes away. Jack removes Gloria from the family, and Ashley leaves town to escape the drama. During a business trip to France, Ashley meets Rick Forrester (Kyle Lowder), and they have an affair. She later travels to Los Angeles to work with Forrester Creations as a lab chemist. Rick and Ashley decide to keep their affair a secret, and she commences a serious relationship with Ridge Forrester (Ronn Moss), whom she becomes engaged to. Ridge's attentiveness to his former love Brooke Logan (Katherine Kelly Lang) ends the engagement. Ashley then has a short-lived romance with Brooke's brother Storm (William deVry). Forrester Creations decide to discontinue their fragrance line, diminishing Ashley's role in the company. She leaves Los Angeles and moves to Europe with Abby.

Ashley locates a missing Victor in France, where they reunite. Upon their return to Genoa City as a couple, they are married and Ashley becomes pregnant. Victor's manipulative son Adam Newman (Chris Engen, later Michael Muhney) gas lights Ashley, making her believe that she is seeing the ghost of Victor's late wife, Sabrina Newman (Raya Meddine). Adam causes Ashley to fall down a staircase and miscarry her baby, though he convinces her that this was a dream, and she suffers an hysterical pregnancy. Ashley checks herself into a psychiatric hospital where Sharon Newman (Sharon Case), also pregnant, is staying. After Ashley begins experiencing hysterical labor, Adam kidnaps Sharon's newborn baby Faith Newman and gives her to Ashley, with Sharon believing her baby was stillborn. In the ensuing months, Sharon marries Adam and develops a close friendship with Ashley. Six months after Faith is born, the doctor that delivered her (who was being blackmailed by Adam) confesses the truth in a letter. Ashley is forced to hand Faith over to Sharon and the child's father, Victor's son Nicholas Newman (Joshua Morrow). Ashley moves on with her life, and becomes engaged to wealthy tycoon Tucker McCall (Stephen Nichols). Prior to their engagement, he slept with Diane Jenkins (Maura West). They briefly split up because of Tucker's secret business plans with Jack, but reunite shortly thereafter. Abby accidentally runs over Tucker with her car, and Ashley protects her by taking the blame. She is accused of attempted murder and driving under the influence. All charges are ultimately dropped, and she marries Tucker. Their marriage quickly lands in divorce because of Tucker's business scheming and his affair with a previous lover, Harmony Hamilton. Ashley is later forced out as CEO of Jabot by Jack, and Ashley decides to move to New York City with Traci. She returns briefly a few months later for the wedding of Victor and Nikki. Months later, Ashley returns for the funeral of her niece Delia Abbott and comforts her brother Billy on his loss. She returns later to spend Thanksgiving with her family. While there, she sprained her ankle and met Dr. Stitch Rayburn (Sean Carrigan). Abby pushed for a romance, but Ashley reminded her that Stitch was married and had a young son.

In town for Abby and Tyler's engagement party, Ashley left early to drop by the hospital and "run into" Dr. Rayburn. But she found Victoria waiting for him to take her on a date. Ashley reminded her that she'd only been separated a week. When Ben arrived, Victoria was jealously catty, informing Ben that Ashley was her former stepmother.

In September 2014, Ashley does not show up in Genoa City after calling a meeting among the major Jabot stockholders, Jack, Billy, Traci, and Abby. Jack phones her, and she explains that she is working on a special project, but had decided it was not yet ready to present to them. The following month, Ashley returns and confirmed that her idea was for a revolutionary new fragrance, and she made a deal with Jack to become Co-CEO of Jabot again if it panned out. Abby had been treating Ben Rayburn nasty and spiteful ever since she found out that he had killed his father as a teen and taken someone else's identity to get his degree in medicine, and broken Victoria's heart. So Abby was shocked when Ashley hired Ben as a chemist for Jabot, despite Abby's objections. Ashley returned to New York City to wrap things up, tasking a reluctant Abby with bringing Ben up to speed on the cosmetics industry. Before she left, she consoled Billy that maybe she could help keep Ben away from Victoria for him.

On Ashley's return, she asks Ben to smell the new fragrance, he found it repulsive, but he kissed her. Ashley reveals that the fragrance contained pheromones and is a love potion, and the kiss has proven it. What she needs was his help to make the scent bearable. Later after Ben was arrested for fraud by a former patient, Ashley bailed him out. She confided in Ben, that she too had taken a murder rap for someone she loved. Ashley asked him to accompany her to Madison on business.

Ben showed up in Ashley's office drunk after seeing Billy and Victoria snuggling with their baby. Ashley threw him in the shower to sober him up, and he pulled her in too. They had sex, and Stitch spent the night. The next day, they agreed to tell no one after Ben found out that he still had a chance with Victoria.

Victor invited Ashley to lunch and tried to get her to take a deal to leave Jabot and work for him at Newman-Chancellor. But Ashley declined and left early, arriving back at the lab in time to see her lab assistant Tobias taking photos of their secret work. She guessed that he was working for Victor, and decided to let him continue to feed him bogus information. Ashley runs into Joe Clark at the athletic club. After referring to them having a good thing going back in New York City, they made plans to spend New Year's Eve together. In May 2017, Ashley's mother Dina came for a "permanent" visit. In October 2017, Dina exposed that John Abbott wasn't Ashley's father. Ashley leaves Genoa City in October 2018, following a series of events that leave her feeling alienated from both the Abbott family and Jabot, following the discovery that John and Dina left legal documents leaving all of Ashley's product patents to her; she confesses she's leaving for Paris to launch her own company with said-patents.

== Reception ==
Jamey Giddens of Zap2it described Davidson as "one of Genoa City's most beloved heroines". Upon learning of Davidson's return to the role in 1999, Candace Havens of the McCook Daily Gazette declared that she had made Ashley "one of the most popular characters on soaps". In October 1999, when all of the Abbott siblings and their father John were together again, the Orlando Sentinel wrote: "In the meantime, having the entire Abbott clan together [...] is like a joyous family reunion for longtime viewers". John Goudas of The Gadsden Times was favorable of Epperson's performance two years into her duration, stating that she "is holding her own", though he noted her to be "Eileen's double". He stated that the front-burner status of Ashley and Brad's romantic storyline demonstrated that producer William J. Bell "has full confidence in [Epperson]".

The character has had a rivalry with Nikki Newman (Melody Thomas Scott) for many years; a poll run in 2008 by website Daytime Confidential asking, "Who would win a cat fight, Nikki Newman or Ashley Abbott?", saw 63% of voters say Nikki would win, with 37% saying Ashley would win. Giddens was favorable of Ashley running Jabot Cosmetics in 2008, writing: "Okay this has to stop. My heart simply can't take it. It's like the effects of yo-yo dieting. Everytime I sincerely think I am done with this genre, something like The Young and the Restless heiress Ashley Abbott (Eileen Davidson) announcing that she, not Lil' Billy (Billy Miller), not Cruella de Bardwell (Judith Chapman) or Gary Ewing (Ted Shackelford) and no, not even Smilin' Jack (Peter Bergman) will be running Jabot Cosmetics, happens." In 2009, Jillian Bowe (also of Zap2it) wondered if Ashley was "insane in the membrane" due to her hearing a crying child around the Newman ranch, writing: "Is "The Beauty" starting to crack up? Certainly looks that when some freaky things take place on The Young and the Restless."

In 2010, Tommy Garrett of Canyon News praised a scene in which Ashley discovers a sex tape made by her spoiled daughter, Abby, that was posted online. Garrett wrote: "Davidson's performance is spot on as the mother Ashley who is fed up. The tears of despair and exhaustion came streaming down Davidson's beautiful face in character, while her spit-fire daughter didn't give a damn." Giddens later wrote that he thought it was "ridiculous" and "outlandish" to make Ashley pregnant with Victor's child in 2009. Also in 2010, Neeketa Borden of Zap2it created a list of "curiously quirky couplings", with Ashley and Tucker listed as an "honorable mention". In a separate review, Garrett credited Davidson as one of the "powerful performers who daytime TV could not exist without having". When the truth was going to come out that Faith Newman wasn't Ashley's child, Giddens wrote: "Lord, I hope this doesn't make my Ashley Abbott go cuckoo for Cocoa Puffs again!" Mike Jubinville of Zap2it wrote that the character's relationship with Neil Winters (Kristoff St. John) had been a "slow burn, one going on for weeks, but one that is hard to miss. It has the ingredients of a hot romance." Upon Davidson's firing in 2012, Giddens wrote: "I am sincerely hoping the brass at Y&R can't possibly be this stupid, but if they are, Gary Tomlin better blow up Davidson's phone STAT about a Days of Our Lives return!"

In 2022, Charlie Mason from Soaps She Knows placed Ashley 18th on his list of the best 25 characters from The Young and the Restless, commenting "Jane Austen only wished she'd ever dreamt up a heroine as compelling as Eileen Davidson's Jabot chemist, a strong-willed protagonist whose luck in love should have convinced her to steer clear of Las Vegas for… frankly, ever!" The following year, Mason from placed Shattuck's portrayal of Ashley on his list of soap opera recasts that should not have happened, commenting:

We get it — it's hard to fill a legend's stilettos. Y&R kinda pulled it off when it first replaced Eileen Davidson with lookalike Brenda Epperson; if you only glanced at your screen, you could almost think they were the same actress. But subsequent Ashley Shari Shattuck — at the time Mrs. Ronn Moss (then Ridge, The Bold and the Beautiful) failed to strike a match, much less catch fire.
