= Victoria Newman =

Fictional Character in the Young and the Restless

- The Young and the Restless character
- Amelia Heinle as Victoria Newman
- Portrayed by: Ashley Nicole Millan (1982–1990); Heather Tom (1990–2003); Sarah Aldrich (1997); Amelia Heinle (2005–present)
- Duration: 1982–2003; 2005–present
- First appearance: November 17, 1982
- Created by: William J. Bell
- Introduced by: H. Wesley Kenney (1982); Edward J. Scott (1990); John F. Smith (2005)
In-universe information
- Other names: Victoria Nicole Newman; Victoria McNeil; Victoria Howard; Victoria Carlton; Victoria Hellstrom; Victoria Abbott; Victoria Locke
- Occupation: Businesswoman (1992–present); Artist (2003–2005); Socialite
- Family: Newman
- Father: Victor Newman
- Mother: Nikki Newman
- Brothers: Nicholas Newman
- Half-brothers: Dylan McAvoy; John Abbott III; Adam Newman
- Half-sisters: Abby Newman
- Husband: Ryan McNeil (1992–1993); Cole Howard (1993–1998) (Note: The first marriage between Cole and Victoria on December 31, 1993 was annulled in February 1994. However, they remarried in April 1994 before divorcing in 1998.); Brad Carlton (2006–2007); J.T. Hellstrom (2008–2010); Billy Abbott (2010–2014) (Note: Billy and Victoria have been married three times. The first ceremony on May 14, 2010, was not legal. They legally married for the first time in September 9, 2010. They divorced on November 28, 2011, and remarried a month later on December 24, 2011 (the episode aired on December 26, 2011). The couple divorced again on September 9, 2014. However, they were married consecutively from 2010 to 2014.); Ashland Locke (2021–2022)
- Sons: Reed Hellstrom
- Daughters: Claire Newman; Katie Abbott
- Adoptive sons: Johnny Abbott
- Grandfathers: Albert Miller; Nicholas Reed
- Grandmothers: Cora Miller; Barbara Reed
- Uncles: Matt Miller
- Aunts: Casey Reed
- Nephews: Noah Newman; Connor Newman; Christian Newman; Dominic Abbott Newman Winters Chancellor
- Nieces: Cassie Newman (adoptive); Summer Newman; Faith Newman

Victoria Newman is a fictional character from The Young and the Restless, an American soap opera on the CBS network. Created by William J. Bell, she is currently portrayed by Amelia Heinle. Victoria was born onscreen in 1982 and was portrayed by child actress Ashley Nicole Millan for her first eight years. Having been rapidly aged to a teenager, Victoria returned to the soap opera and was portrayed by Heather Tom. Tom portrayed the character into her early adult years and remained in the role for thirteen years. Due to creative differences, Tom left the soap opera in 2003 and Heinle, who debuted as Victoria on March 21, 2005, was cast in the role.

The daughter of businessman Victor Newman (Eric Braeden), Victoria was described as "the teenager from hell" during her early years, and as an adult she was written as a ruthless character. Her storylines have involved romances with older men, family conflicts, and difficult pregnancies. Victoria is the third member of the Newman family to appear in the program and was joined later by her younger siblings. Her early romances included long-standing relationships with Ryan McNeil (Scott Reeves) and Cole Howard (J. Eddie Peck). Upon her second return to the show she had relationships with J.T. Hellstrom (Thad Luckinbill) and Billy Abbott (Jason Thompson). In 2026, she began a sexual relationship with Kyle Abbott, many years her junior. Victoria has four children: Claire Grace (Hayley Erin) by Cole, Reed Hellstrom (Tristan Lake Leabu) by J.T., Johnny Abbott, Billy's son whom she adopted as her own, and Katie Abbott.

Tom won the Daytime Emmy Award for Outstanding Younger Actress in a Drama Series twice for her portrayal of Victoria, and received nominations for eight other Emmy awards. Critics praised Tom's portrayal of the character, though her marriages at an early age were criticized. Heinle's portrayal later won her the Daytime Emmy Award for Outstanding Supporting Actress in a Drama Series in 2014 and 2015.

== Casting ==
Between 1982 and 1990, Victoria was portrayed by child actress Ashley Nicole Millan. After Millan left the series, Victoria was rapidly aged to become a teenager, and Heather Tom assumed the role on December 12, 1990. In 1997, Tom took a nearly eight-month leave of absence from the role, departing on February 21 and returning on October 2. During Tom's absence, Sarah Aldrich was cast as her temporary replacement, appearing from April 2 to July 17, 1997.

In 1999, Carrie Genzel was in talks to replace Tom, who was experiencing "touch-and-go" contract negotiations. However, Tom signed another three-year deal with the soap opera and said she was "very excited" about her continuation. In September 2003, Tom's spokesman announced that she would leave the show because of "creative differences" with executive producer David Shaughnessy. Speaking of her departure, Shaughnessy said that it was "tough" to see her go and that "they would miss her tremendously". Tom made her final appearance as Victoria on December 17, 2003, and she later said that she left the role because "things weren't going in her best interests".

The soap opera's producers intended Victoria to return in January 2004 but auditions failed to find a suitable replacement for Tom. Amelia Heinle was later cast in the role and made her first appearance on March 21, 2005. Rachel Kimsey also auditioned for the role and Heinle had auditioned for Mackenzie Browning; Kimsey was given Mackenzie and Heinle was given Victoria. Heinle has stated on many occasions that she had "serious doubts" about taking over Tom's role. In 2013, she recalled on what intimidated her about Tom, saying: "Heather is pure backbone, and that's probably what intimidated me about following in her footsteps because that's not me naturally." In 2008, she took maternity leave and was off-screen for weeks. In March 2011, Heinle announced that she had signed a new contract which would secure her in the role for an unspecified period. In November 2013, it was announced that Heinle had signed another contract to continue her portrayal of Victoria for an additional two years.

== Development ==
=== Characterization and portrayal ===
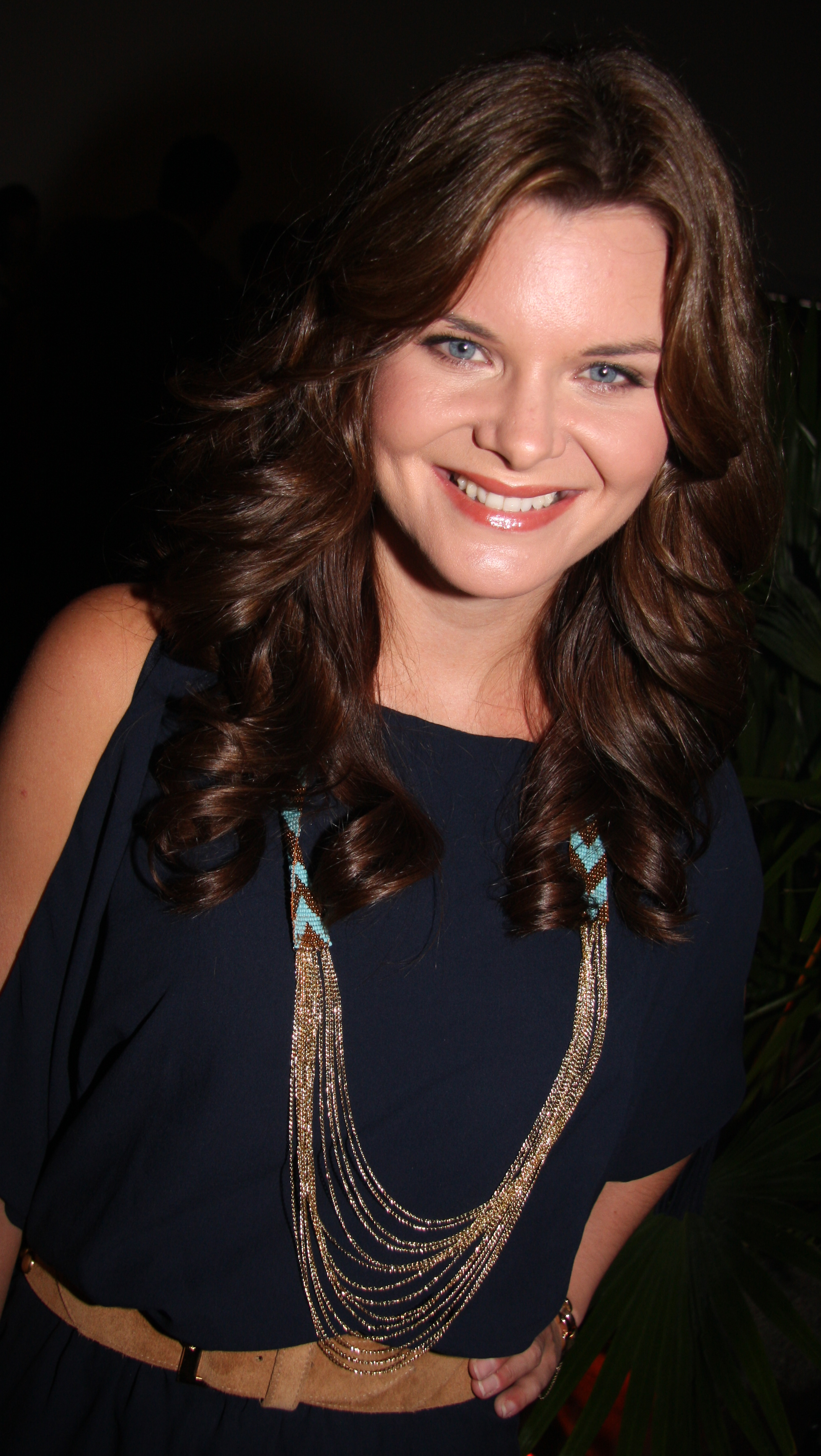
Heather Tom described Victoria as having her father's strength and her mother's "manipulative skills".

"Victoria is such a rich character, so I have found the way that I want to play her and a way that the fans seem to be okay with. What I've been trying to do over the years is a mix of heroine and humor, but someone who could run a business. Sometimes, I felt I failed miserably and sometimes, it's been okay. If you're smart, you remember that somebody better can always come along, so it keeps you on your toes."

— Heinle, describing the way she portrays Victoria (2013)

According to SoapNet, Victoria is "ruthless in the board room" and "nobody's damsel in distress". The soap opera's official website describes the character as having "displayed both her father's headstrong qualities and her mother's tendency to be impulsive". While the character was a teenager, Kelly O'Sullivan of the New York Daily News called her "the teen from hell". Heather Tom said that Victoria had Victor's strength and the manipulative skills of her former-alcoholic mother Nikki. Of the character's determination, Tom said that "Victoria knows disappointment, yet she gets her way most of the time" and "she goes after what she wants, and wins". During Victoria's divorce from Cole Howard (J. Eddie Peck), The Orlando Sentinel said that Victoria's behavior was "pig-faced".

=== Relationships ===
Victoria has her first romance with Ryan McNeil, which ends when he leaves her for Nina Webster (Tricia Cast). The series' creator William J. Bell said that Victoria knew Nina still loved Ryan and suspected that the marriage would not last, and that "in Victoria's mind, the threat is still there". She is then married to Cole Howard for four years but they begin to have marital problems after Cole's affair with Ashley Abbott (Shari Shattuck). Tom said that being married on a soap opera is "short lived" and that she knew Cole and Victoria would eventually face difficulties, which she found challenging to act. While pregnant with Cole's child, Victoria has a relationship with Neil Winters (Kristoff St. John) and plans to raise the child with him, but her daughter Eve Howard dies shortly after birth and she and Neil separate. After being raped by an insane man, Victoria reunites with Ryan and they plan to marry before he is shot dead by his ex-wife, Tricia Dennison (Sabryn Genet). Victoria also has brief relationships with Diego Guittierez (Greg Vaughan) and Michael Baldwin (Christian LeBlanc).

A decade after her marriage to Cole, Victoria marries Brad Carlton (Don Diamont); their marriage ends after Brad has an affair. She then becomes pregnant with J.T. Hellstrom's (Thad Luckinbill) child and during her pregnancy becomes comatose. Heinle believed Victoria and J.T. would "stay together for a while before they wreck it". After it was announced that Luckinbill was leaving the soap opera, Victoria and J.T. drift apart and eventually divorce. Victoria next begins a relationship with Billy Abbott that their feuding families are against; Heinle described Billy as "the forbidden fruit" and compared their romance to Romeo and Juliet. They later marry in a 1950s-styled screen wedding; her wedding dress was inspired by a gown worn by Audrey Hepburn in the film Funny Face. Actress Elinor Donahue was cast to portray the judge that officiates their wedding, as former co-head writer Scott Hamner felt that Donahue could help them achieve the sense of a "retro-fantasy of better, simpler times". After their wedding, Billy illegally purchases a baby girl for Victoria. Heinle felt this plot was a good way to add conflict drama to the soap opera. The couple lose custody of the child, Billy leaves Genoa City and Victoria divorces him, but her father hides Billy from his family. The pair are later reunited in a New York airport bar. Hamner noted that Victoria would be "absolutely furious" at her father for what he had done: "[There is a] potential for a huge rift between father and daughter, and there will be some consequences for Victor with his relationship with Victoria in light of all that he's done to keep her apart from the man she loves." He also stated that the "impact of those secrets coming to light was going to be very serious in Billy and Victoria's ability to move forward together".

== Storylines ==
In 1990, eight-year-old Victoria becomes upset that her mother Nikki Newman (Melody Thomas Scott) has married Jack Abbott (Peter Bergman), even after he saves her from drowning in a swimming pool. When she continues to misbehave, her parents send her to boarding school in Switzerland. Later that year, Victoria returns as a moody teenager who is working in the mailroom at her father's company, Newman Enterprises, and becoming smitten with Ryan McNeil (Scott Reeves), who is older than her. Victor offers Ryan money to leave town but he and Victoria elope. Their marriage ends when Ryan leaves her for Nina Webster (Tricia Cast) in 1993. Victoria then falls in love with Cole Howard (J. Eddie Peck) and they marry the following year, but their marriage is quickly annulled when it is believed by their parents that they are half-siblings, as Victor is believed to be Cole's father. When this is proved untrue they wed again; this marriage breaks down four years later when in 1998 Cole has sex with Ashley Abbott (Shari Shattuck/Eileen Davidson), her former stepmother. Victoria becomes pregnant with Cole's child and chooses to raise it with Neil Winters (Kristoff St. John). Her baby girl, Eve Howard, was believed to have died a few days after birth and Victoria ends her union with Neil. Victoria briefly tries and fails to win Cole back from Ashley. In 1999, Victoria meets Gary Dawson (Ricky Paull Goldin) and they begin dating, though she soon discovers that he is stalking her and ends the relationship. Enraged, Gary kidnaps Victoria in a tree house and she is raped. She takes months to recover. She and Ryan then reunite and plan to remarry, but on their wedding day in November 2001 Ryan's ex-wife Tricia Dennison shoots and kills him, leaving Victoria devastated. She then has a brief relationship with Diego Guittierez (Diego Serrano/Greg Vaughan) in 2002, and afterward dates Michael Baldwin (Christian LeBlanc). The following year, some of Victor's crimes come to light and Victoria leaves town when these and other family problems overwhelm her. She moves to Florence, Italy, where she studies Art History.

In 2005, Victoria returns to Genoa City after Jack makes her a job offer to run Jabot. She tries to resume her relationship with Michael, only to discover he has married Lauren Fenmore (Tracey E. Bregman). She then begins dating her father's business rival Brad Carlton (Don Diamont) and in 2006 they marry, much to Victor's disapproval. Victoria becomes pregnant with Brad's child but miscarries. Their marriage ends in 2007 when Victoria discovers that Brad had an affair with Sharon Newman (Sharon Case), her former sister in law, before their wedding. During her marriage she forms a friendship with J. T. Hellstrom (Thad Luckinbill) and they have sex twice, resulting in a pregnancy of unknown paternity. J.T. is revealed as the father, and during her pregnancy Victoria is hit by falling rocks—caused by an explosion—which leaves her comatose. She recovers and gives birth to a son, Reed Hellstrom (Max Page), and she marries J. T. in February 2008. After J. T. kisses his ex-girlfriend Colleen the following year, Victoria has an affair with Deacon Sharpe (Sean Kanan), complicating their marriage, which ends in 2010 after J. T. becomes intimate with Mackenzie Browning (Clementine Ford).

Victoria then begins a secret romance with Billy Abbott. She and Billy marry while intoxicated in Jamaica, but the marriage is declared invalid and they remarry. During the ceremony, Victor has Victoria arrested in an attempt to stop the wedding. J.T. gains full custody of Reed and moves to Washington, DC with his new wife Mackenzie for her job. Victoria and her siblings pursue a lawsuit against Victor to gain control of a cosmetics line. After Victoria miscarries a child with Billy, he illegally pays $2,000,000 for a child, whom they name Lucy in January 2011. Phyllis Summers (Michelle Stafford) gains custody of Lucy and Billy leaves town without disclosing his whereabouts to his wife. Victoria later pursues divorce proceedings in Billy's long absence. After their divorce, Victoria and Billy's mother, Jill Fenmore, try unsuccessfully to locate Billy whose daughter, Delia Abbott has Leukemia and needs a bone marrow transplant. The pair find each other in a New York airport bar, reunite, and remarry in December 2011. As they return home from their honeymoon, Chelsea Lawson (Melissa Claire Egan) arrives, announcing she is pregnant with Billy's child. Chelsea barters with Billy demanding 3 million dollars. She later gives birth to a boy, Johnny, but gives Billy full custody of their son. Victoria decides to stay in her marriage to Billy and help him raise the child. Later, Victoria returns to Newman Enterprises to try to save it from Sharon's destruction. While on business in Miami in November 2012, she is kidnapped by Eddie G. (Blake Gibbons), who demands that Billy repay a gambling debt as a ransom. Eddie is shot and killed in front of her, and she is finally rescued by her brother Nick, and recovers. Billy later relapses in his gambling addiction, and the couple briefly separate. However, Victoria again decides to reconcile with Billy and continue their marriage. In October 2013, Billy's daughter Delia is struck and killed by Adam in a hit and run accident. Billy embarks on an affair with a woman in his grief support group, Kelly Andrews (Cynthia Watros). Meanwhile, Victoria grows close with Stitch Rayburn (Sean Carrigan). Victoria files for legal separation after Billy's affair is exposed, and she ends up sleeping with Stitch. Victoria then finds out she is pregnant but is unsure of the child's paternity. The child, named Katherine Rose after Victoria's late godmother Katherine Chancellor (Jeanne Cooper), later turned out to be Billy's, but Victoria decides to continue her relationship with Stitch regardless. However, Victoria and Stitch's relationship comes to an end soon thereafter when Stitch develops feelings for Victoria's half-sister, Abby (Melissa Ordway). Victoria and Billy end up reuniting again, much to Victor's chagrin. The reunion with Billy doesn't last long and she later begins a brief relationship with Travis Crawford.

In 2017, J. T. returns to Genoa City to investigate Victor's personal bank accounts, following some "sizable" transfers to off-shore accounts. He finds out that Nikki was stealing money from Victor but does not turn her in. J. T. tells her that his marriage to Mackenzie is over, and they get back together. She hires him as head of security at Newman while he is secretly working as a spy for Paul Williams (Doug Davidson) and Christine Blair (Lauralee Bell) to dig up information on Victor and Newman Enterprises. J. T. becomes abusive towards Victoria, and they end up having a horrible fight where Victoria was able to escape through the bathroom. It turns out Victor had been spying on them, and he sees what J. T. did to Victoria and finds out J. T. is spying on him. A fight ensues, causing J. T. to push Victor down the stairs, leaving him unconscious. J. T. leaves, and Victor's condition is blamed on Jack. While he is in the hospital. J. T. tried to kill Victor by turning off his ventilator, but the problem was resolved by the staff. J.T. apologizes to Victoria and proposes to her. While they are on vacation in Hawaii with the kids, Victoria finds his phone and finds out that Paul and Christine hired him to investigate Victor. She confronts him, and he tells her he did it in exchange for the fact she and Nikki wouldn't go to jail. She breaks up with him. During a girl's night with her mother, Sharon, Mariah (Camryn Grimes), and Phyllis (Gina Tognoni), Victoria tells them everything about her relationship with J. T. Later that night, J. T. sneaks into her bedroom in an attempt to win her back. She tells him no and finds out that he was the one who put Victor in the hospital and tried to kill him while he was there. As she tries to call the police, he slaps her. Hearing what's going on, Sharon, Nikki, and Phyllis rush upstairs to see J. T. assaulting her. Nikki grabs a fire poker and hits him on the head. When they feel no pulse, assuming he is dead, they bury him. In March 2019, J. T. is revealed to be alive and watching the Newman women at the Abbott cabin.

In 2021, Victoria meets with Ashland Locke (Richard Burgi) in an attempt to buy his company, Cyaxares. He ends up selling it to her father and Adam (Mark Grossman). When Ashland has to go to New York to finalize his divorce from his wife, Tara (Elizabeth Leiner), he invites Victoria to tag along. She turns him down initially but changes her mind. He tells her that he has been diagnosed with Stage six Small-cell carcinoma, and the two get closer. When Ashland goes public with his diagnosis, Victoria suggests merging Locke Communications Group with Newman Enterprises. Victoria and Ashland get engaged and marry in Tuscany. Ashland tells Victoria his backstory and that his real name is Robert DeFranco, and it is later revealed Ashland lied about his cancer diagnosis, and Victoria realizes he was playing her. Victoria pretends to still be in love with him while the Newman's plots revenge against him. Adam offers Ashland five million dollars to leave town. He initially refuses, but Victoria convinces him to take it, saying they can leave town and start over. He takes the money, Victoria reveals she was playing him, and Ashland admits he truly loves her. Following a car accident that resulted in Ashland saving Victoria's life and the death of Sharon's husband, Rey Rosales (Jordi Vilasuso), Victoria gets back together with Ashland. She turns her back on her family and resigns as co-CEO of the company. The two try to start a new company but struggle to fund it, and Victoria convinces him to put the $5 million in their joint account. Victoria transfers the funds and books a flight back home. She tells Ashland that she was manipulating him all along and that she was saying goodbye. Ashland also returns to Genoa City and is arrested when he violates his restraining order against his son Harrison, who is actually Kyle Abbott's (Michael Mealor) biological son. He gets out on bail and follows Victoria home. There, he tells her that she is no better than him; she laughs at him, provoking him to hurt her. As she defends herself, Nick arrives. She tells Nick what just happened, so Nick punches Ashland, causing him to hit his head on the hearth. They try to save him, but they feel no pulse. They walk outside, but when they return, Ashland is not there. Michael tells Victor that Ashland's body was found dead in a car after crashing into a ravine. It turns out Victor's security team went inside, took the body, put it in a rental car, and staged the accident. Victor tells Victoria and Nick that Ashland died the moment he was punched.

Victoria later begins an affair with Nate Hastings, (Sean Dominic) who was in a relationship with Elena Dawson (Brytni Sarpy). A suspicious Elena travels to Los Angeles, where Nate is on a business trip, and catches him having dinner with Victoria. He confesses sleeping with Victoria, and she breaks up with him. Victoria and Nate briefly become a couple afterwards. During a hostage situation in Oregon between Victoria, her parents, Nick, and Cole Howard, Nikki's assistant, Claire Grace (Hayley Erin), claims to be Victoria and Cole's daughter Eve, who supposedly died after childbirth. Claire's aunt Jordan (Colleen Zenk) told her she was their child and brainwashed her into thinking Victoria and Cole abandoned her. They don't believe that Claire is their daughter. They tell her Jordan is lying; they didn't abandon their baby; she died after birth, and they loved her. Jordan is Cole's aunt, who had an estranged relationship with her sister, Eve. Jordan, who was a nurse at Memorial stole baby Eve and switched her with a dead baby. She did this in revenge for how the Newman's treated Eve and not having the chance to make up with her before she died. Hearing this revelation, Claire turns her back on her aunt and tries to process everything. A DNA test confirms that Claire is in fact baby Eve. Later, Victoria and Cole decide to try to get to know their newfound daughter, while Claire was sent to the psych ward at Genoa Memorial. Claire, at first decides to push them away out of guilt, but slowly starts to develop a bond with both of them. Claire later asked them, if she could visit Jordan in Prison in order to get closure. They agreed, with Claire taking Victoria and Cole with them. After, her confrontation with Jordan, Claire cuts ties with her and later follows her parents out of prison. After Jordan escapes prison after setting the place on fire, Cole and Victoria visit Claire in hospital to inform her of her aunt's escape from Prison. Victor had ordered Michael to release Claire out to the hospital and into the custody of her parents, in order to plan a trip for Jordan, who began a revenge plot against the family. After Jordan kills Nikki's friend and her AA sponsor, Seth Morgan (Brian Gaskill) by pushing him into an upcoming speeding car, Jordan calls Claire, who informs her that she is staying with her mother, unaware that Victoria and Claire are staying at the Newman Ranch. Later, Victoria receives a phone call from authorities to inform her that Jordan set her house on fire. When Victoria and Victor arrive at her house, the entire house is permanently damaged. As a result, Victoria moves into the tack house at the ranch with Claire and Victoria and Cole start bonding about their past together at the same very house. Soon after Cole kisses Victoria.

== Reception ==
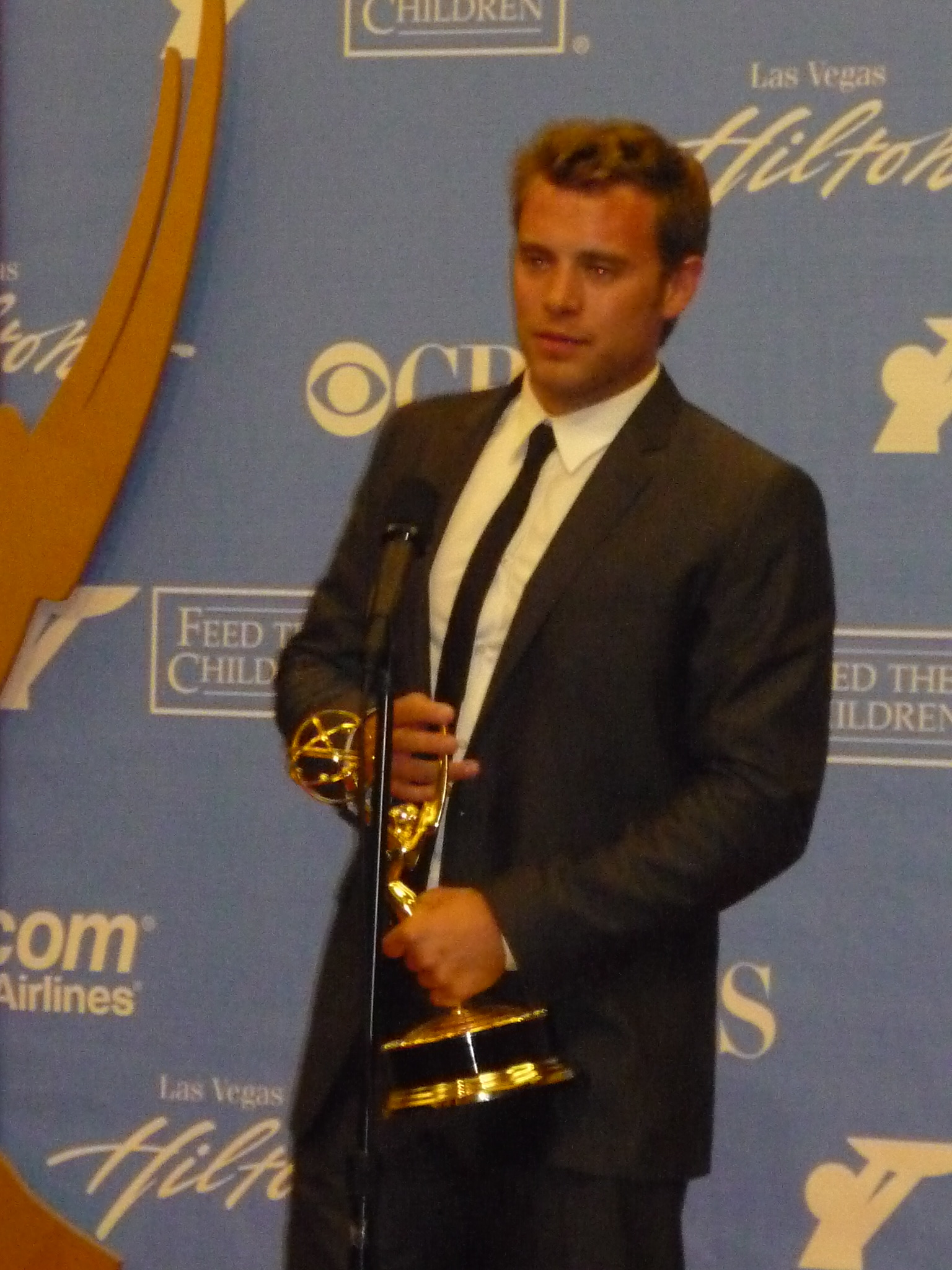
Victoria's relationship with Billy Abbott, portrayed by Billy Miller, has been positively received.

Connie Passalacqua of the Herald Journal compared Victoria's scheme to reunite her parents in 1991 to the plot of the 1961 film The Parent Trap. She wrote, "[w]hat makes Victoria a true terror teen? We venture that it may be the supernatural soap aging by which she aged from 5 to 15 last fall." Fort Worth Star-Telegram criticized Victoria's early romances, saying: "[s]he's divorced, rich and hates sex. And now she wants her husband back. As soap operas go, Victoria Newman's plight ... is standard daytime fare. But Victoria has one characteristic that many of her counterparts don't—she is only 17." A syndicated article that appeared in The Fort Oglethorpe Press described Ryan McNeil's attempts to seduce Victoria as "a path that's fraught with peril and which forces the good-natured actor to search hard for inspiration". SoapNet said it was "no surprise" Victoria has a history of "messy relationships" given her parents' history. Lilana Novakovich of the Toronto Star said that Heather Tom made Victoria become "one of her favorite characters" on the soap upon her debut in 1991. The Austin American-Statesman said that Tom was "always a pleasure to watch".

"Victoria has definitely let her hair down and showing that her robo-pack does come equipped with a funny bone and smile mechanism. Love is bringing about a change in these two. Billy’s midas touch has emboldened Victoria to stand up to her overbearing father, while the former playboy has been unusually tame, his pillow talk peppered with declarations of love and babies."

— Nekeeta Borden of Zap2it on Victoria and Billy's relationship (2010)

Dan J. Kroll of the website SoapCentral wrote that the process to find a replacement for Tom was an "exhaustive search". Amelia Heinle, who critics praised for her portrayal of Victoria, has been listed on the "Top 5 Actresses" poll of CBS Soaps in Depth for over eight consecutive weeks. Her relationship with Billy has garnered a significant fan following, allowing them to lead CBS Soaps in Depth's "Top 10 Couples" poll for over six consecutive weeks. Elinor Donahue, who portrayed the judge that marries Victoria and Billy, said she thought their "retro wedding" was "adorable" and "extremely well written and not overdone". Zap2it placed Victoria and Billy at number four of their "10 Best Soap Couples of 2011". Jamey Giddens of Zap2it said Victoria and Billy are "so scrumptious together", and that "it's so nice to have some reason to say something kind about The Young and the Restless for a change". Giddens also said that he "adores this pairing that he was so prepared to hate". Sara Bibel of Xfinity wrote of their relationship: "Billy (Billy Miller) and Victoria (Amelia Heinle), who have already had three weddings in the year and a half that they have been together, actually seem rational. They should change the wedding vows in the G.C. from "until death to us part," to "until one of us changes our mind." However, Bibel was later unfavorable of the couple attempting to have a child less than six months after marrying.

In 2011, during a storyline that saw Victoria and her siblings sue their father for control of a cosmetics line, Bibel wrote: "Victoria, whose true motivation was to get her hands on Beauty of Nature so she could become its CEO, got a rude awakening when Nick told her in no uncertain terms that he had no interest in trading the settlement money for the company. I think the second stage of the battle will be the Newman siblings squabbling over the money a la King Lear, assuming the show actually allows Victor to lose for more than a few episodes." Soon after, Bibel said that Victoria had been "whiny" and found the character's mother Nikki's storyline "far more interesting". That same year, Giddens wrote that a blogger from The Washington Post compared Victoria to Rupert Murdoch, saying: "[a] partial nod must go to the soap opera The Young and the Restless, whose character Victoria Newman was arrested on her wedding day for allegedly bribing a foreign dignitary. Television and Murdoch and ’round-the-clock FCPA conjecture—it's a welcome publicity storm for the FCPA bar."

In 2013, Bibel criticized the soap opera when Victoria "decided to give up a corporate career to become a children’s book author", writing: "From the time she was SORASED into a teen, Victoria’s ambition was to run Newman Enterprises. She was the child who inherited Victor’s (Eric Braeden) business acumen. He, being a male chauvinist, always viewed the more family oriented Nick as his heir apparent. Her struggle to get her father’s recognition is what fueled her." She also stated that while watching the series, there was "the sense that women could, if that was what interested them, be power players". Of Victoria's choice to leave Newman Enterprises, Bibel wrote: "For Victoria, it came across as giving up Peggy Olsen’s life for Betty Draper’s. I was also peeved by her telling her mother that she didn't have the first idea of how to become an author. She ran a major cosmetics company. She should have a hundred contacts in publishing, and the confidence and skills to figure out what she doesn't know. I got to thinking about all of the ways that, over the past few months, the women of Genoa City have been, to use the lingo of Leaning In, the most popular non-fiction book in the country right now, leaning out." Tommy Garrett of Highlight Hollywood blamed head writer Josh Griffith for turning the character into a "hard-nosed unforgiving socialite".

Heather Tom won two Daytime Emmy Award for Outstanding Younger Actress in a Drama Series for her portrayal of Victoria in 1993 and 1999, and received eight other nominations for the same award. She also won a Soap Opera Digest Award for Outstanding Leading Younger Actress in 1997, and was nominated for two other awards.

In 2022, Charlie Mason from Soaps She Knows placed Victoria 23rd on his list of the best 25 characters from The Young and the Restless, saying "Passion's plaything. Daddy's girl. Boss lady. Whatever you choose to call Victoria, from Heather Tom to Amelia Heinle, she’s always been front and center, a lightning rod for electric storylines."
