= Cindy Ambuehl =

American actress and fashion designer

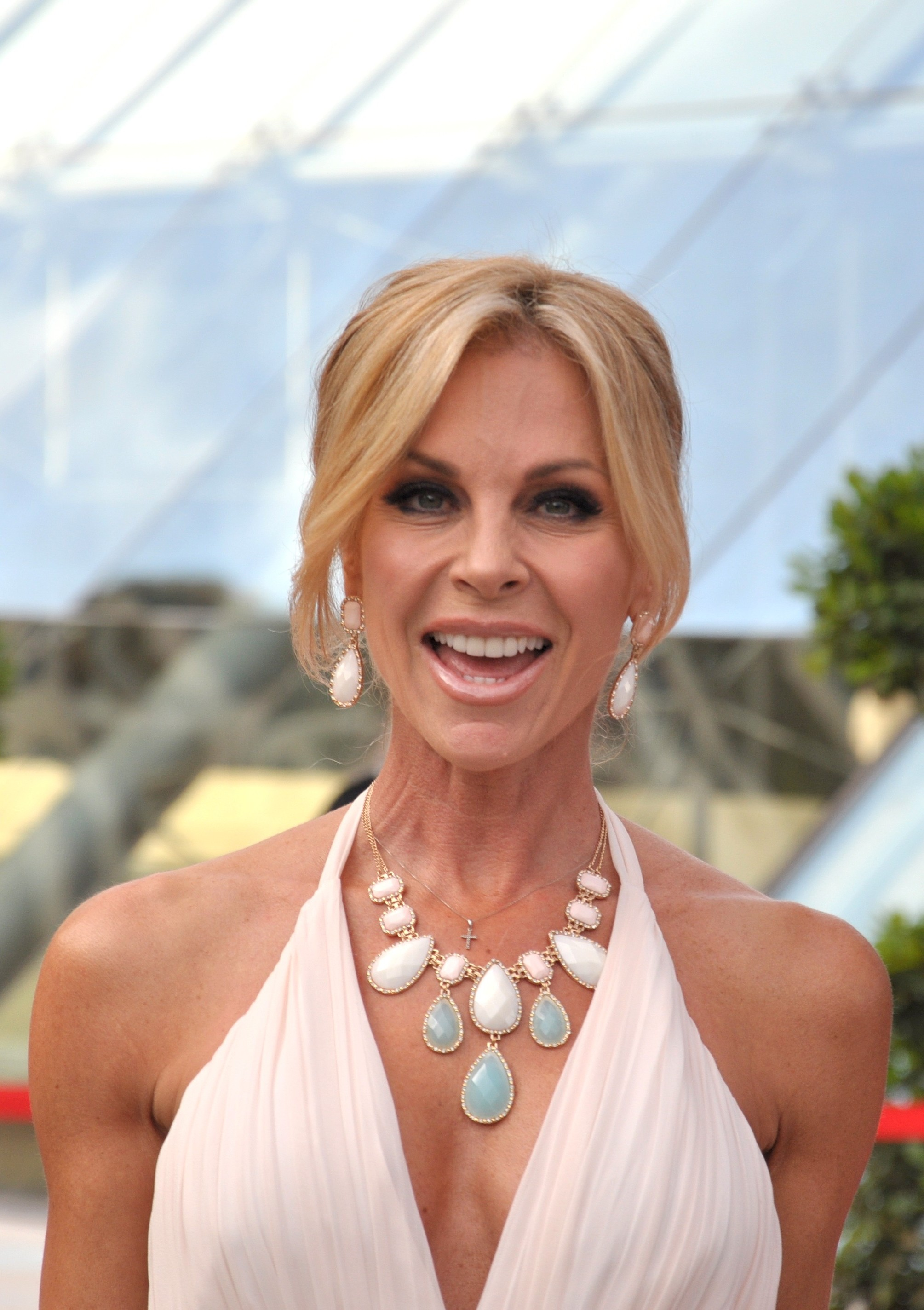
- Ambuehl at the 2013 Monte-Carlo Television Festival
- Born: Cindy K. Ambuehl; January 31, 1965 (age 61); Los Angeles, California, U.S.
- Occupations: Actress; realtor; model
- Years active: 1990–2010; 2016
- Spouse: Don Diamont (m. 2012)
- Children: 2

Cindy K. Ambuehl (born January 31, 1965) is an American actress and real estate agent.

== Career ==
Ambuehl was born in Los Angeles, California. Before becoming an actress, she was signed by the Judith Fontaine Modeling and Talent Agency as a model. She appeared in Wings as Stella in the season five episode "A Black Eye Affair" and in Seinfeld as Sophie in "The Burning". She also was in the second episode "Temptation" of the first season of Men Behaving Badly. From 2000 to 2003, she had a recurring role on the television series JAG as a TV producer and Harmon Rabb's girlfriend, Rene Peterson.

== Personal life ==
She married actor Don Diamont on June 12, 2012. They have twin sons, born in 2000, Anton and Davis Diamont.

== Filmography ==
=== Film ===
Year	Title	Role	Notes
1992	The Naked Truth	Miss Italy	
1994	Phantasm III: Lord of the Dead	Edna	
1995	Body Count	FBI Special Agent Janet Hood	
1996	Dark Breed	Burgess	
1997	Meet Wally Sparks	Lola Larue	
2001	Outlaw	Michelle Silverman	

=== Television ===
Year	Title	Role	Notes
1990	Archie: To Riverdale and Back Again	Ethel Muggs	Television film
1990–2016	The Bold and the Beautiful	Kim Swanson / Amy / Bunny	14 episodes
1991–1996	Silk Stalkings	Various Roles	3 episodes
1992	Down the Shore	Tawny	Episode: "Schwing Time"
1993	Sisters	Brittany Mills / 'Frankie'	Episode: "Moving Pictures"
1993	Fallen Angels	Auditioning Blonde #2	Episode: "Since I Don't Have You"
1993	Wings	Stella	Episode: "Black Eye After"
1993, 1995	Renegade	Maureen / Susan Caruso	3 episodes
1994	Dave's World	Sarah	Episode: "Four Characters in Search of a Ring"
1994	Good Advice	Chardonnay	Episode: "Divorce, Egyptian Style"
1994, 1996	Weird Science	Li-Zar / Brooke	2 episodes
1995	Cybill	Cat	Episode: "Virgin, Mother, Crone"
1995	Platypus Man	Kristi	Episode: "Without a Hitch"
1995	Fast Company	Kimberly Dawn	Television film
1995	High Tide	Susan Davis	Episode: "Personal Property"
1995	Pointman	Marcie Fry	2 episodes
1995	The Pursuit of Happiness	Linda	Episode: "The Transference"
1996	Strange Luck	Penny Dickinson	Episode: "In Sickness and in Wealth"
1996	Can't Hurry Love	Sarah	Episode: "Between the Lines"
1996	Diagnosis: Murder	Ginger	Episode: "The Murder Trade"
1996	Men Behaving Badly	Cindy	Episode: "Temptation"
1996	Pacific Blue	Sandy Kellogg	4 episodes
1996	Boys & Girls	Denise	Television film
1997	Chicago Sons	Amy	Episode: "The Things We Do for Love"
1997	The Jeff Foxworthy Show	Pam	Episode: "Mooseface Loves Nuzzles"
1997	Caroline in the City	Kristin	Episode: "Caroline and the Reception"
1997	Head over Heels	Valentina	7 episodes
1997	Union Square	Patty	Episode: "Get Rusty"
1998	Seinfeld	Sophie	Episode: "The Burning"
1998	Love Boat: The Next Wave	Tanya	Episode: "I Can't Get No Satisfaction"
1998	Ellen	Candy	Episode: "Ellen: A Hollywood Tribute: Part 2"
1998	The Secret Diary of Desmond Pfeiffer	Mona	Episode: "A.O.L.: Abe on Line"
1998	Buddy Faro	Harmony Vandermeer	Episode: "Ain't That a Kick in the Head"
1998	Frasier	Madeline	Episode: "Secret Admirer"
1998	Brother's Keeper	Lisa	Episode: "The Boss of Me"
1999	The Jamie Foxx Show	Lana	Episode: "Bro-Jack"
1999	DiResta	Brittany	Episode: "Your Daddy Don't Dance"
1999–2000	Action	Jane Gianopolis	4 episodes
2000	18 Wheels of Justice	Sherry Beltran	Episode: "Ordeal"
2000	Ally McBeal	Lorna Flood	Episode: "Turning Thirty"
2000	Rude Awakening	Lamella	Episode: "All's Well That Amends Well"
2000–2003	JAG	Rene Peterson	24 episodes
2001	Son of the Beach	Nicorette	Episode: "Grand Prix"
2001	Nikki	Emily	Episode: "Take This Job and Love It"
2001	Charmed	Beverly "Bev"	Episode: "Muse to My Ears"
2005	Malcolm in the Middle	Darlene Fisher	Episode: "Mrs. Tri-County"
2005	Inconceivable	Joanne Marrak	Episode: "Secrets and Thighs"
2006	Cold Case	Stephanie Levine	Episode: "Lonely Hearts"
2009	Meteor	Cheryl	2 episodes
2010	Jonas	Maggie Belle	Episode: "Beauty and the Beat"
