= Brad Carlton =

Fictional character from the American CBS soap opera The Young and the Restless

- The Young and the Restless character
- Don Diamont as Brad Carlton
- Portrayed by: Don Diamont (1985–2009); Russell Todd (1993)
- Duration: 1985–1996; 1998–2009
- First appearance: April 7, 1985
- Last appearance: September 17, 2009
- Created by: William J. Bell
- Introduced by: H. Wesley Kenney
- Crossover appearances: The Bold and the Beautiful
In-universe information
- Other names: George Kaplan (birth name); Bradley George Carlton (alias); Brad (nickname)
- Occupation: Businessman; Gardener; Navy SEAL
- Father: Arthur Kaplan
- Mother: Rebecca Kaplan
- Sisters: Stephanie Kaplan
- Wife: Lisa Mansfield (1979–1984); Traci Abbott (1986–1989, 1991–1992); Cassandra Rawlins (1991); Ashley Abbott (2000–2006); Victoria Newman (2006–2007)
- Sons: Robert Carlton
- Daughters: Colleen Carlton
- Adoptive daughters: Abby Newman
- Grandsons: Dominic Abbott-Newman-Chancellor (adoptive)
- Aunts: Isabel Montalcini

Brad Carlton is a fictional character from the CBS soap opera The Young and the Restless, portrayed by Don Diamont. The character became a mainstay on the series for over 20 years. He was known for his relationships with Traci Abbott, Ashley Abbott and Victoria Newman, as well as his business rivalries with Jack Abbott and Victor Newman. In 2009, the character drowned in a frozen lake.

== Casting ==
Don Diamont portrayed the role of Brad for the character's entire run on the series. He first appeared on April 7, 1985, as the new Abbott family gardener. In 1993, Russell Todd was temporarily recast in the role.

Diamont’s character has also appeared on The Bold and the Beautiful in past crossover events. Diamont’s appearances on the show were April 19-21, 1993 and March 8, 1995.

Diamont departed The Young and the Restless in 1996 and returned after two years on July 28, 1998. Ten years later in December 2008, news broke that Diamont had been let go from The Young and the Restless. Fellow cast member Eric Braeden, who portrays Victor Newman, spoke out on Diamont's firing, saying:

I was very sad about that, to be quite frank with you. He did some of his best work in the last months, where he played the "shifty" guy and the bad guy and you don't know quite what he is up to. I think he played that extremely well. I always think that's a mistake to let people go that have been part of the fabric as long as he has been. Furthermore, he was related to people on the show, and personally, I think those things are a mistake. If you want to save money, then cut down on hiring new actors.

Diamont filmed his final scenes for the series in January 2009, and his final airdate was on February 5 when he drowned after falling in a frozen lake. Shortly after, it was announced that Diamont had been hired on The Bold and the Beautiful. He was to portray Bill Spencer Jr., created specifically for him by head writer Bradley Bell. "It's funny how one door closes and another opens," Diamont said. "I had a lot of emotion tied to Y&R. My entire adult life had been there, including so many relationships. Little did I know that such a great character and work situation was literally around the corner." Diamont briefly reprised the role eight months after the character's death as a hallucination by his daughter, Colleen.

== Storylines ==
=== 1985–2005 ===
Brad Carlton was first introduced as the Abbotts' gardener, who caught the eye of the youngest Abbott daughter, Traci. The two were married twice, with the second marriage producing a daughter, Colleen Carlton. During his second marriage to Traci, Brad was held captive in a cage by his unstable first ex-wife, Lisa Mansfield. After he divorced Traci, Brad was tricked into marrying the wealthy widow, Cassandra Rawlins, after a ski trip to Aspen. Brad eventually returned to Genoa City with plans to divorce Cassandra, but en route to finalize her divorce plans, Cassandra was hit by a truck and killed. Brad inherited her fortune and her estate. Throughout his on-and-off relationship with Traci, he had feelings for her sister, Ashley Abbott. They eventually married, and he adopted her daughter who was given his last name, Abby Carlton. Ashley was pregnant with Brad's child, but she lost the baby in a car accident. They split up, and he later married Victoria Newman in November 2006.

Known as a "playboy," Brad has also had flings with Lauren Fenmore, Jill Abbott, Diane Jenkins and Olivia Winters. He was also briefly engaged to Nikki Newman. In one 1994 storyline, Brad had a heart attack during a passionate night with Lauren.

The consummate opportunist, Brad rose to prominence in Genoa City's business world somewhat quickly, with his marriage to Traci Abbott and relationship with the Abbott family giving him his start. He stepped on a lot of toes over the years, particularly Victor Newman and his one-time brother-in-law, Jack Abbott. Brad's anger boiled over in 2005 when Jack refused to instate him as CEO of Jabot. Brad stormed out of the office, and he soon took a job at Newman Enterprises to spite Jack.

=== 2006–2009 ===
In 2006, Brad married Victor's daughter, Victoria, much to her father's dismay. For the duration of their marriage, Brad continued to fight his feelings for Victoria's one-time sister-in-law, Sharon Newman. During this time, he also had an affair with Sharon. Upon Victor's initiation of a background check on Brad, it was discovered in a retconned storyline after almost 20 years of being on the show that Brad was not who he had initially claimed to be. Brad's real name was George Kaplan, and he assumed the identity of a friend who died in an accident in order to hide from the people who had killed his family.

A 2006 story arc involved Brad's past catching up with him, as his mother, Rebecca Kaplan, had to help find an artifact that was stolen from its rightful owners by the Nazis who had put Rebecca to work in a concentration camp cataloging stolen art. Rebecca had been forced to do this because she was Jewish.

Victoria became pregnant with Brad's child, but she, too, miscarried shortly thereafter. Brad and Victoria subsequently divorced. Victoria discovered that she was pregnant again, but the father turned out to be J.T. Hellstrom, to whom she was now married. After the collapse of Clear Springs, Victoria got struck by falling debris, and she was in a coma for months. After waking up, Brad let the cat out of the bag about Victor firing Nick from Newman Enterprises. After the divorce, Brad still tried to be with Sharon, several times, but he failed.

Frustrated and angered at his inability to advance at Newman Enterprises, Brad joined Jabot Cosmetics in May 2008 as Chief Operating Officer. At Jabot, Brad became somewhat of a confidant–spy for Chancellor Industries CEO, Jill Abbott. Brad also had a somewhat difficult relationship with David Chow, the co-CEO of Jabot. Because of his dislike for Chow, who admitted to a problem with compulsive gambling, Brad repeatedly invited David to card games, lent him large sums of money to pay off gambling debts and gave him tips on horse races in a successful effort to take advantage of David's gambling addiction and to gain leverage over him.

Following the death of his wife Sabrina Costelana Newman, Victor disappeared to Mexico only to be declared dead by Mexican authorities after an apparent boating accident. As stipulated in Victor's new will, the lion's share of his estate was bequeathed to his son, Adam Newman, who was going by his birth name of Victor Adam Newman Jr. Adam embarked on radical changes within the company, assuming the position of chairman of the board and installing Brad as CEO of Newman Enterprises and right-hand man in "expanding Newman globally" . Adam fired long-time Newman employees Neil Winters and Victoria Newman, while making an enemy of the executor of the Newman estate, Michael Baldwin. Having schemed, back-stabbed and betrayed to get ahead, it appeared that Brad had finally achieved the executive position that he had coveted for so long. Shortly after being hired by Adam to be CEO of Newman Enterprises, Victor returned and fired his son. Victor also reinstated Neil Winters as CEO. Later that week, Neil asked Brad to step down as CEO of Newman saying that if he did not, then he would sue Brad for hacking into Newman Enterprises personal files and taking them to Jabot Cosmetics. Brad agreed, and he stepped down as CEO.

When Sharon's marriage started to crumble again, Brad got another chance to approach her, especially after Phyllis had called him and tried to convince him to seduce Sharon so that she would stay away from Nick. Brad eventually revealed to Sharon that Phyllis sent him after her, and Sharon was not able to forgive Brad. He followed Sharon to Jack's cabin, where he apologized and explained how much he still loved her, but she was not able to return his feelings. He left the cabin, and on the road home, he found Noah Newman drowning in a lake after falling through the ice. He managed to pull Noah out of the water and back onto the ice, but fell in himself and was swept under the frozen lake by the current. He drowned and his dead body, frozen in the ice, was discovered later. His last appearance was several months later when he appeared to his daughter, Colleen, as she herself was drowning in the same lake while trying to escape the clutches of the demented Patty Williams.

== Reception ==
In 2022, Charlie Mason from Soaps She Knows placed Brad 17th (just behind Ashley) on his list of the best 25 characters from The Young and the Restless, commenting "Slap whatever label you want on Don Diamont's pre-The Bold and the Beautiful character. Heartthrob. Himbo. Heel. You name it. We still hung on his every word—and assumed that the sometime lawn boy's handling of shrubbery had rightly earned him his accolades as one of the world's best... er, gardeners."
