= The Bold and the Beautiful =

American television soap opera (since 1987)

- Also known as: B&B
- Genre: Soap opera
- Created by: William J. Bell; Lee Phillip Bell
- Written by: Various (currently Bradley Bell and Michael Minnis)
- Directed by: Michael Stich; Deveney Kelly; Cynthia J. Popp; David Shaughnessy; Jennifer Howard
- Starring: Present cast; Past cast
- Theme music composer: Jack Allocco; David Kurtz; John Nordstrom
- Opening theme: "High Upon This Love" by Allocco and Kurtz
- Country of origin: United States
- Original language: English
- No. of episodes: 9,000

Production
- Executive producer: Various (currently Casey Kasprzyk)
- Producers: Cynthia J. Popp; Mark Pinciotti
- Production locations: Sunset Las Palmas Studios; Hollywood, California
- Camera setup: Multi-camera
- Running time: approx. 19 minutes (US); approx. 21 minutes (International)
- Production company: Bell-Phillip Television Productions Inc.

Original release
- Network: CBS
- Release: March 23, 1987 – present

Related
- Beyond the Gates; The Young and the Restless

The Bold and the Beautiful (often referred to as B&B) is an American television soap opera created by William J. Bell and Lee Phillip Bell for CBS. It premiered on March 23, 1987, as a sister show to the Bells' other soap opera The Young and the Restless; several characters from each of the two shows have crossed over to the other since the early 1990s. Set in Los Angeles, California, the show centers upon the Forrester family and their haute couture business.

The program features an ensemble cast, headed by its longest-serving actors John McCook as Eric Forrester and Katherine Kelly Lang as Brooke Logan. Since its premiere, the show has become the most-watched soap in the world, with an audience of an estimated 26.2 million viewers. As of 2010, it continued to hold on to the second-place position in weekly Nielsen Ratings for daytime dramas. The Bold and the Beautiful has also won 77 Daytime Emmy Awards, including three Daytime Emmy Awards for Outstanding Drama Series, in 2009, 2010 and 2011.

On September 7, 2011, the series switched to high-definition television, making it the second-to-last American soap to make the switch, at the time. B&B was the last American soap opera to make the transition due to the cancellation of ABC's One Life to Live before it returned along with All My Children on April 29, 2013. The series celebrated its thirtieth anniversary on March 23, 2017. The serial aired its 9,000th episode on April 18, 2023. Currently, the serial has been renewed by CBS to run through the 2027–2028 television season.

== Premise ==
The Forrester family, 'c. 2008 (l–r): Kristen (Tracy Melchior), Thorne (Winsor Harmon), Felicia (Lesli Kay), Eric (John McCook), Stephanie (Susan Flannery) and Ridge (Ronn Moss)

The Bold and the Beautiful debuted on March 23, 1987. Set in Los Angeles, it centers around the Forrester family and their fashion house business, Forrester Creations. Like many soap operas, B&B looks into the lives of wealthy families and how love affairs, scandals, and betrayals affect each of the family members and their relationships with each other.

Following the original premise of sister show The Young and the Restless (Y&R) with the wealthy Brooks and the working-class Foster families, B&B also introduced the middle-class Logan family as a source of conflict with the Forresters. Like the Fosters of Y&R, the Logans were also initially headed by a single mother. The rivalry between Forrester matriarch Stephanie Forrester and the Logan's eldest daughter Brooke Logan plays a key role in the drama of B&B, like the Katherine Chancellor–Jill Abbott rivalry in Y&R. Another enduring B&B storyline is the star-crossed love of Brooke and the Forresters' eldest son Ridge.

The back story was that Stephanie Douglas, the strong-willed daughter of wealthy Chicago businessman John Douglas, met her husband-to-be Eric Forrester, who aspired to become a fashion designer, while they both studied at Northwestern University in 1959. The young lovers rushed to get married after Stephanie became pregnant, forcing Eric to break up with his college sweetheart Elizabeth "Beth" Henderson in the process.

Eric and Stephanie then moved to Los Angeles where they established Forrester Creations, designing and producing upscale men's and women's fashion, based on a combination of a loan from Stephanie's father, Eric's designing talent and Stephanie's business acumen and connections. While winning international recognition, fame, and wealth with their work, the couple managed to raise four children: elder and favorite son Ridge, brother Thorne and younger sisters Kristen and Felicia. Meanwhile, Beth married their classmate Stephen Logan on the rebound, raising their own family in the San Fernando Valley of Los Angeles. The Logans had four children of their own: eldest son Stephen "Storm" Jr., and daughters Brooke, Donna and Katie. Unable to achieve success like Eric and live with the shadow of Eric's memory in Beth's heart, Stephen walked out on the family, leaving Beth as a working-class single mother.

=== Start and development of the series ===
The pilot episode of the show focuses on the preparations for the wedding of the Forresters' eldest son, Ridge, to Caroline Spencer, the daughter of the media mogul Bill Spencer. At this time Ridge has already become a fashion designer and vice president of Forrester Creations. Many media outlets throughout the world, from the big television networks to the most honorable newspapers, to the last gossip newspapers publicize their wedding, declaring it "the wedding of the year in the fashion world." Thousands of women see the pictures of Ridge and speculate on the identity of the woman who has won the heart of the man who has, until recently, been a playboy, and who has refused to settle for one woman.

One of the curious is Brooke, whose life soon becomes a key element in the series. Her love affair with Ridge sets up much of the storyline, beginning in the first year after the aforementioned "wedding of the year in the fashion world" was called off when Ridge was caught cheating on Caroline with an old flame. Every so often, Ridge and Brooke reunite only to break up due to various circumstances, and Ridge invariably finds comfort (in most cases, this would lead to marriage) with another love of his life, Taylor Hayes. Following one of her breakups with Ridge, Brooke marries his father, Eric, who divorces Stephanie to do so. Brooke gives birth to two children with Eric. The couple eventually divorce and Eric reconciles with Stephanie. Likewise, Brooke and Ridge resume their pattern of an on-again-off-again relationship, between Brooke's relationships with other men and Forrester family members, and Ridge's multiple reunions with Taylor. Eric eventually marries Brooke's sister, Donna Logan, and legally adopts her son Marcus. They later divorce due to their family's bitter history.

The rivalry between Stephanie and Brooke also becomes a key storyline in the series. The strong-willed Stephanie originally has a cordial relationship with the Logans after hiring their catering company. But she soon disapproves of Brooke becoming part of the Forresters' lives, believing she is an "opportunist from the valley" who swooped in after the "wedding of the year in the fashion world" was called off. Stephanie also does not initially recognize that Beth is the same woman who was Eric's former college girlfriend. Having marital problems since the start of series, Eric soon seeks the comfort of Beth. Once Stephanie learns of the affair, she secretly hires a private investigator to track down Steven Logan and then sends an anonymous letter to the Logan household as to his whereabouts. After Donna finally convinces their father to return home, Stephanie arranges with Bill Spencer to give Stephen a job in Paris. Only Brooke figures out that Stephanie was the one working behind the scenes. When confronted, Stephanie justifies her actions to Brooke saying that she is trying to save both of their families, and threatens Brooke that otherwise she will ruin her relationship with Ridge. After her parents reunite and move to Paris, and realizing to what extremes Stephanie would go to get what she wants, Brooke swears revenge.

Felicia and Kristen Forrester eventually choose to follow their own paths, leaving the family company to be run by Ridge, Thorne, Rick, Marcus, and their families. A key element of the show in the late 1990s was Brooke and Eric's son Rick's relationship with singer turned fashion designer Amber Moore.

=== Complementing families ===
The Spencer family and their media conglomerate Spencer Publications were first introduced in the pilot episode. Patriarch Bill Spencer was a widower and originally claimed that Caroline was his only daughter. A love triangle develops between Caroline, Ridge and Thorne, leading to a point in 1988 where a drunk Thorne shoots his older brother in the back (which Stephanie covers up to protect both of her sons by lying to authorities that she had fired the gun, thinking it was a burglar). After Caroline dies from leukemia in 1990, her twin sister Karen Spencer, who was abducted from the Spencers when she was a baby, resurfaces. In 2009, Bill dies from a terminal illness, dividing Spencer Publications between Karen and his previously unknown illegitimate son, Bill Spencer Jr. The Spencers have been expanded in recent years to include Karen's daughter Caroline Spencer and Bill Jr.'s sons Wyatt Spencer, Liam Spencer, and Will Spencer.

For many years, Spectra Fashions was Forrester's main rival, headed by Sally Spectra. Sally, a larger-than-life character with outrageous clothes and a sizable red hair, is a key element in both comedic and dramatic storylines, with the help of long-time confidante Saul Feinberg, ditzy receptionist Darla Forrester, and fashion designer Clarke Garrison, who in 1991 fathered C. Garrison Fathman, Sally's son. Originally, Sally and Stephanie Forrester are bitter enemies; Spectra is only referred to in 1987 when Stephanie hires Clarke away from her rival. Sally and Spectra Fashions finally appear on-screen in 1989 when Clarke goes back to his former boss. In later years, Sally and Stephanie develop a friendship; Sally even ends up working at Forrester Creations in 2006 after she finally makes the decision to shut down her own company.

Sally's daughter, Macy Alexander, a singer, undergoes many traumas, most notably alcoholism. She and Thorne Forrester are involved in an on-again-off-again marriage. After she eventually loses Thorne to Brooke, Macy goes abroad and into hiding with her father, Adam in 2000. After being discovered in Italy in 2002, Macy returns to Los Angeles where she reunites with Thorne Forrester before developing an interest in fellow recovering alcoholic, Deacon Sharpe, whom she marries in 2003. Weeks later, Macy is gravely injured at a nightclub where she is headlining as a singer. She enters a coma and it is implied that her family pulls the plug off-camera.

The Spectra family and friends are gradually supplanted after the 2001 introduction of Massimo Marone and his entourage. Marone, a billionaire shipping magnate, was a childhood friend of Stephanie and dated her in college. They slept together once just before Stephanie began dating Eric Forrester, and after forty-something years, a medical crisis reveals that Massimo is actually Ridge's biological father. In 2003, Jackie Payne, a former lover of Massimo, arrives on the scene and announces that her son, Dominick "Nick" Payne, a captain at Marone Industries, was also fathered by Massimo. Unlike Ridge, Nick was not a businessman and took the surname Marone.

== Production ==
=== Development ===
In 1986, CBS was on the hunt to replace Capitol, and contacted several writers and producers for proposals. Paul Rauch created Grosse Pointe as a replacement. During her absence from Ryan's Hope, Michael Brockman, former President of CBS Daytime, asked Claire Labine to develop a new serial in 1986. Her proposal was entitled Celebration, but never made it to the air. Had it been greenlit, Jane Greenstein would have been Assistant to the Head Writer like she was on General Hospital. William J. Bell created The Bold and the Beautiful, which was originally titled Rags, a reference to the garment industry. On June 20, 2017, CBS announced its decision to renew the serial through the 2017–18 television season. On April 20, 2020, CBS announced plans to begin airing a week of vintage episodes, following the soap's shutdown, due to the COVID-19 pandemic in the United States. On May 20, 2020, it was announced that CBS had renewed the soap through 2022. On June 15, 2020, TVLine reported the series would be the first to resume production on June 17 as the first scripted series on American soil to get back up and running following Hollywood's three-month, coronavirus-imposed shutdown with a representative telling the website: "The health and safety of our cast and crew are of foremost importance to us, We will be following all protocols set forth by the State, City, Television City, and the various guilds."

On March 2, 2022, it was announced that CBS had renewed the soap through 2024; an optional third year was included in the renewal, with the option picked up in February 2024. In April 2025, it was announced the serial had been renewed for three additional seasons, through the 2027–2028 television season. That October, Casey Kasprzyk was named co-executive producer of the serial. His appointment makes him the first non-Bell family member in the serial's history to hold the position.

=== Taping ===
Since its inception, production has been shot at Stage 31 at Television City in Los Angeles for its entire run so far. The show typically uses the traditional soap opera look, featuring constructed sets such as the Forrester Mansion, the Shady Marlin and the Forrester Creations offices. Like other soap operas, B&B is usually taped three to four weeks in advance. In recent times, the show has increased shooting on location, in the way fellow CBS soap Guiding Light did in its final two network years. Many of the characters have taken trips to the fictional "Bikini Beach", which is actually a nearby California beach, and there have been scenes around the Forrester Creations building which appear to be shot somewhere on the lot or inside of CBS Television City. On June 5, 2025, it was announced production would leave Stage 31 at Television City, following a multi-year expansion and renovation plan for the studio spaces. Production relocated to Sunset Las Palmas Studios in Hollywood, California, when production resumed on August 19, following the serial's annual summer break. Subsequent reports claimed the move came at the conclusion of their current lease at Television City.

=== Theme song and title sequence ===
Pre-launch logo for The Bold and the Beautiful, used in promos

"High Upon This Love", the theme song of The Bold and the Beautiful, was written by David Kurtz and Jack Allocco and features a prominent saxophone sample played by Eric Marienthal. From November 1998 to July 1999 in the United States, a vocal version of the theme song performed by Dionne Warwick was played during the end credits.

Some international versions, most notably in Italy and France, have different opening and ending credits. In Italy, the opening and closing theme was composed by Roberto Colombo. The opening theme (Tutti Beautiful) was used since his Italian premiere until 2011, while the closing theme (Beautiful Caroline) was used until 2017.

For the 30th anniversary season in 2017, the show rolled out a title sequence based on the original used in one form or another from 1987 to 2004. At the same time, it also introduced an instrumentation of "High Upon This Love" based on the original.

== Cast and crew ==
=== Cast ===
John McCook (Eric Forrester) and Katherine Kelly Lang (Brooke Logan) are the only two cast members who have remained on the show since it first aired on March 23, 1987. During the show's first 25 years, McCook and Lang were part of the "core four" original cast members, the other two being Susan Flannery (Stephanie Forrester) and Ronn Moss (Ridge Forrester). When Moss announced that he was leaving the show in August 2012, the role of Ridge was eventually recast more than a year later. When Flannery also announced her departure later that year, it was decided to have Stephanie's character die after losing her battle with cancer. Two other original characters currently appear on the show, Donna Logan and Katie Logan, but both have been recast since the show's premiere.

=== Executive producers and head writers ===
==== Executive producers ====
The Bold and the Beautiful executive producers
Name	Years
William J. Bell	March 23, 1987 – June 6, 1988
William J. Bell and Lee Phillip Bell	June 7, 1988 – February 14, 1996
Bradley Bell	February 15, 1996 – November 13, 2025
Casey Kasprzyk	since November 14, 2025

==== Head writers ====
The Bold and the Beautiful head writers
Name	Duration
William J. Bell	March 27, 1987 – May 4, 1993
Bradley Bell	May 5, 1993 – January 28, 2008
Co-head writer John F. Smith	May 5 – 19, 1993
No head writer listed	January 29, 2008 – February 4, 2008
Kay Alden (WGA strike)	February 5, 2008 – April 15, 2008
Bradley Bell	April 16, 2008 – July 3, 2023
Co-head writer Kay Alden	January 2, 2009 – October 2, 2013
Co-head writer Michael Minnis	January 2, 2009 – July 3, 2023
Michael Minnis (WGA strike)	July 5, 2023 – November 7, 2023
Bradley Bell and Michael Minnis	November 8, 2023 – present

== Awards and nominations ==
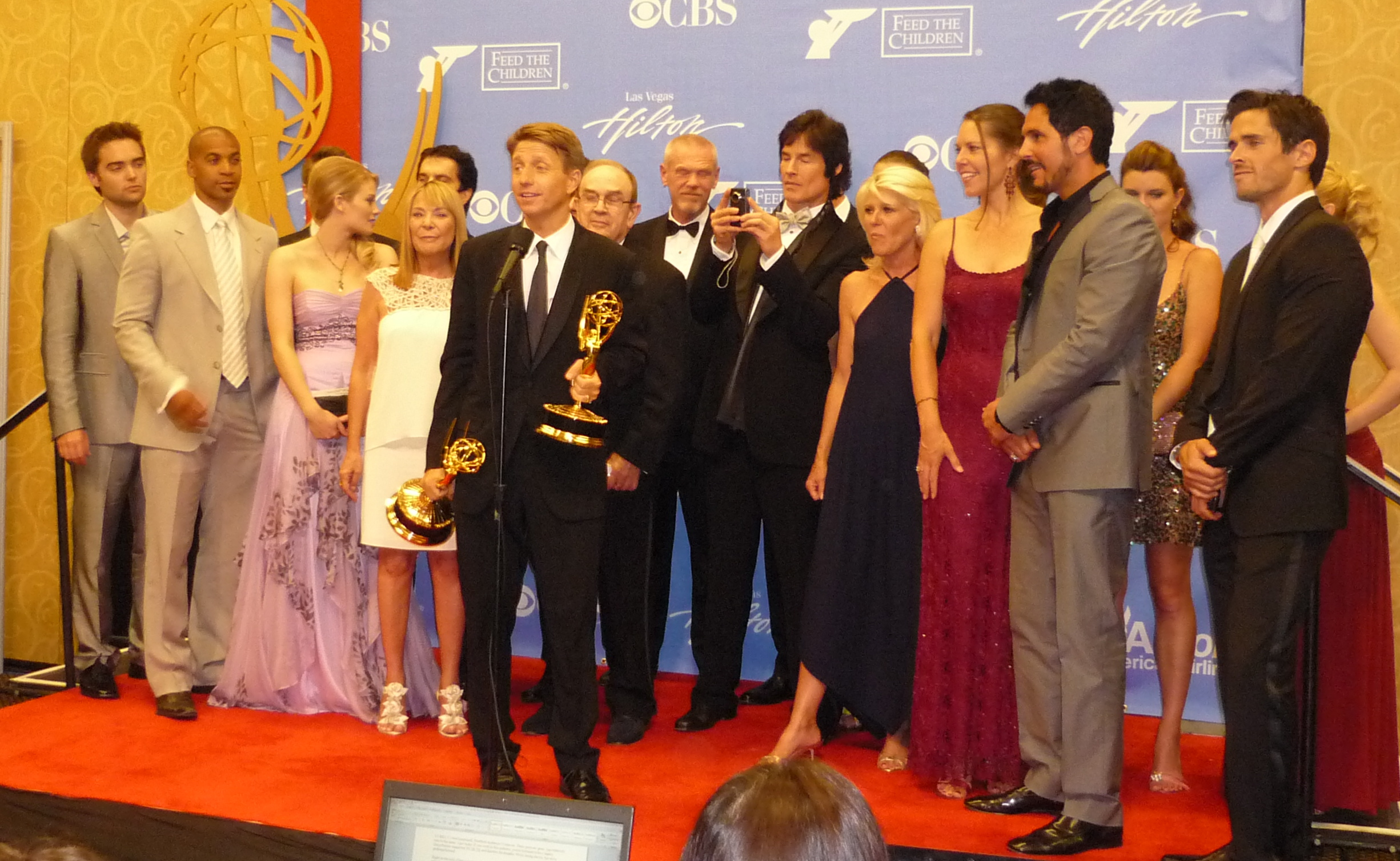
The cast and crew of The Bold and the Beautiful at the 2010 Daytime Emmy Awards

Nominated for over two hundred prizes and accolades since its debut, the series has won several awards over the years, including the Daytime Emmy Award for Outstanding Drama Series, in 2009, 2010 and 2011. The Writing team also won the Daytime Emmy Award for Outstanding Drama Series Writing Team in 2010 and 2013. Susan Flannery has personally won a Daytime Emmy Award for Outstanding Lead Actress in a Drama Series on three separate occasions.

== Ratings ==
Upon its debut as the replacement of former soap opera Capitol in the CBS Daytime lineup, The Bold and the Beautiful ended eighth in the final year ratings. Initially CBS's lowest-rated soap, its numbers were still respectable and began to climb. By 1992, after a successful crossover involving villain Sheila Carter from The Young and the Restless, it had climbed to third. By the mid-to-late 1990s, following yet another crossover, it moved up to second and has consistently remained there since. Throughout the 2000s, The Bold and the Beautiful and all the other remaining network daytime dramas witnessed a steady erosion of viewers, mainly due to vastly altered viewing habits induced by cable networks and alternative genres such as reality, court shows, and talk shows on minor network affiliates, along with consistent breaking news pre-emptions that often unexpectedly broke viewing momentum.

== Distribution ==
=== Broadcast ===
Since the cancellation of Port Charles, it is currently the only American soap opera with a running time of 30 minutes (including commercials) and was the last remaining American soap broadcasting in the fullscreen standard-definition television picture format, until the show upgraded to 16:9 aspect ratio high-definition television in September 2011. Episodes airing in the United States air for approximately 19 minutes, while international broadcasts air to a runtime of approximately 21 minutes.

=== International broadcast ===
The series has aired in Italy since 1990 under the dub title Beautiful. The series first aired on Rai Due from June 4, 1990 to April 3, 1994, airing up until episode 1502, which on Rai were reassembled as 902 episodes of varying length. From April 5, 1994, episode 1503 aired on Canale 5, with reruns of recent seasons airing on sister channels over time. Since June 2024, Mediaset Extra airs repeats of episodes starting from season 23.

The Flemish broadcast started in 1990 on TV1; at its peak, the ratings surpassed one million viewers. The rights were handed over to VTM in 1999 and then to Vijf TV in 2006 - each time the rights moved to another network, the ratings declined. In May 2015, VIJF ceased airing the series due to declining ratings.

In 1995, Canal 1 in Portugal broadcast the series as Malha de Intrigas. Only a package of 240 episodes aired.

South African channel SABC 3 aired the soap between September 1997 and March 4, 2019, when it was removed from the schedule due to cost issues. The series returned to African television on the now-defunct pan-African channel Eva on DStv, with the English and Portuguese feeds airing episodes from 2019 starting in May 2020.

In Latvia, the series aired on LTV1 from January 4, 1995 to July 20, 2010. showed Latvijas Televīzija. Initially a package of 200 episodes was scheduled to air (starting from episode 170), but this has since increased to more than 6000 episodes broadcast at the time LTV ended the series. The voice-over translation was provided by Harijs Spanovskis, who made his last recording of the series on July 8. Interest in the series decreased over time; by the mid-2000s, the series had left circulation in Estonia and Lithuania; LTV1 stopped airing the series due to declining ratings.

In Poland, the series is known as Moda na sukces. It first aired on TVP1 from September 5, 1994, to December 9, 2014, when it was cancelled due to high distribution costs. The series returned on April 1, 2015, to TVN's Player VOD service, where it aired until October 3, 2022. On September 22, 2022, the series moved to Red Go VOD service and continued until on May 7, 2025, when episode 8857 was released.

In the United Arab Emirates, the series aired on Dubai 33 until its closure in 2004. Due to complaints from viewers, the series returned on Dubai One.

=== Home media ===
The earliest DVD releases of The Bold and the Beautiful came in 2008 and 2009, when "Fan Favourites Collection" and "Best of Weddings" were released in Europe and Australia. These DVD sets contained a random selection of 21 and 25 episodes, respectively, from 1987 up until that point in time. These sets sold well and from 2010 to 2011, Beyond Home Entertainment in Australia released another 3 sets containing a random selection of 25 episodes each. These sets, however, only contained episodes from 2003 onwards, frustrating some long-term fans, as a large proportion of the show was left out. One of these sets, entitled "Most Shocking Moments", was also released in the US on July 23, 2012, on the Amazon Video service, but only contained 15 episodes.

The series was released from the very beginning in Germany (April 29, 2011), Sweden (November 23, 2011), the United States (November 6, 2012) and Australia (December 3, 2012). All DVD sets contain 25 episodes, with the exception of the US release only containing 16. The German releases have sold well, with distributor Fernsehjuwelen having released box 2 later in 2011 and boxes 3-7 throughout 2012. Boxes 8, 9 and 10 are set for release in late 2014 through 2015.

In March 2026, a streaming service was released that included every episode from the first thirty-seven seasons as well as specials and behind the scenes content to celebrate the shows 39th anniversary.

Home media releases
DVD title	Number of episodes	Release date		
DVD title	Number of episodes	Region 2 (EU)	Region 4 (AU)	Region 1 (US)
Fan Favorites Collection	21	September 3, 2008	November 19, 2008	—N/a
Best of Weddings	25	March 11, 2009	April 1, 2009	—N/a
Most Shocking Moments	25 (AU) / 15 (US)	—N/a	October 6, 2010	July 23, 2012
Catfights and Brawls	25	—N/a	December 1, 2010	—N/a
Best of Brooke, Ridge & Taylor	25	—N/a	March 2, 2011	—N/a
How It All Began [Box 1]	25 / 16 (US)	April 29, 2011	December 3, 2012	November 6, 2012
How It All Began [Box 2]	25	October 14, 2011	May 1, 2013	TBA
How It All Began [Box 3]	25	February 17, 2012	May 1, 2015	TBA
How It All Began [Box 4]	25	April 27, 2012	September 1, 2015	TBA
How It All Began [Box 5]	25	August 3, 2012	TBA	TBA
How It All Began [Box 6]	25	November 23, 2012	TBA	TBA
How It All Began [Box 7]	25	November 23, 2012	TBA	TBA
How It All Began [Box 8]	25	November 28, 2014	TBA	TBA
How It All Began [Box 9]	25	November 28, 2014	TBA	TBA
How It All Began [Box 10]	25	April 2, 2015	TBA	TBA

== Crossovers ==
There have been several crossovers among other CBS Daytime shows.

=== The Young and the Restless ===
==== 1992 ====
- The Bold and the Beautiful: Sheila Carter (Kimberlin Brown) was the first major character to cross over to The Bold and the Beautiful. Sheila appeared on The Young and the Restless from 1990 to 1992 (returning as a guest in 1993, 1994, and 1995), and again from 2005 to 2006 (Michelle Stafford took over the role of Sheila from 2006 to 2007). She was on The Bold and the Beautiful from 1992 to 1998, with shorter-lived stints in 2002 and 2003, and from July 2017 to March 2018.
- The Bold and the Beautiful: Molly Carter (Marilyn Alex) appeared several times after her daughter, Sheila, was revealed to be living in Los Angeles.

==== 1993 ====
- The Young and the Restless: Eric Forrester (John McCook) called Lauren from his office to invite her to Los Angeles.
- The Bold and the Beautiful: Brad Carlton (Don Diamont) crossed over to confront Sheila Carter about the photos of his tryst with Lauren Fenmore (Tracey E. Bregman), fearing that he would lose custody of his daughter, Colleen, if they became public. Although Brad's threats were enough to make Sheila give up the photos, Lauren later discovered that there was still more evidence proving their affair.
- The Young and the Restless:Stephanie Forrester (Susan Flannery) appeared on Y&R to inform Lauren of Sheila's marriage to Eric.
- The Bold and the Beautiful: Dr. Scott Grainger (Peter Barton) and Lauren Fenmore were vacationing on Catalina Island in November, where they were shocked to find Eric Forrester and Sheila Carter also on a romantic retreat. The character Scott Grainger died during this crossover, but not before he forgave Sheila for her past and begged Lauren not to reveal their history to Eric.

==== 1995 ====
- The Young and the Restless: Eric Forrester (John McCook) appears at his office in Los Angeles to inform Sheila that Lauren will be coming to town.
- The Young and the Restless: James Warwick (Ian Buchanan) made a brief crossover when he called Lauren from Sheila's dungeon. Brad Carlton also makes an appearance.
- The Bold and the Beautiful: Lauren Fenmore (Tracey E. Bregman) crossed over to The Bold and the Beautiful, where she stayed until 1999, and briefly returned in 2002, 2004, and 2007. She had already appeared on the show several times prior to her becoming a regular cast member, mostly due to Sheila's crossover in 1992.

==== 1998 ====
- The Young and the Restless: Brooke Logan (Katherine Kelly Lang) crossed over to meet with Victor Newman (Eric Braeden) at his Newman Enterprises office in Genoa City, Wisconsin. In her effort to spice up the deal she's trying to work out, Brooke drops her jacket and reveals that she is wearing very little. Much to Victor's chagrin (and possible enjoyment), Brad Carlton (Don Diamont) and Jack Abbott (Peter Bergman) walk in on the scene.
- The Bold and the Beautiful: Jack Abbott (Peter Bergman) crossed over to meet with Eric Forrester (John McCook), Brooke Logan (Katherine Kelly Lang), Ridge Forrester (Ronn Moss), and Thorne Forrester (Winsor Harmon). The Forresters were looking for a new scent to go along with Brooke's Bedroom Line, and thought that Jabot Cosmetics could help.

==== 1999 ====
- The Bold and the Beautiful: Victor Newman (Eric Braeden) appeared to meet with Brooke Logan (Katherine Kelly Lang), and to make Ridge Forrester (Ronn Moss) jealous. With prodding from Brooke, Victor agreed to kiss her, thus enraging Ridge and ruining his night out with Dr. Taylor Hayes Forrester (Hunter Tylo). (January 25 – 28, 1999)

==== 2000–2001 ====
- The Bold and the Beautiful: Dr. Tim Reid (Aaron Lustig), who was Phyllis Summers' therapist, moved to Los Angeles and helped Morgan DeWitt (Sarah Buxton).

==== 2003 ====
- The Bold and the Beautiful: Lauren Fenmore's (Tracey E. Bregman) mother, Joanna Manning (Susan Seaforth Hayes), appeared in her capacity as a ranking employee of Fenmore's Department Stores. (May 15, 2003)

==== 2004 ====
- The Bold and the Beautiful: Lauren Fenmore (Tracey E. Bregman) received an angered phone call from the husband of her employee Jacqueline Payne Marone, who demanded to know if the two had really gone out drinking the night before like he was being told. Although she was caught off-guard, Lauren said they had, assuming Jacquie had a good reason for lying to her husband. In truth, Jacquie had told her husband this to help cover up her one night stand with Deacon Sharpe (Sean Kanan). (May 17–20, 2004)

==== 2005 ====
- The Young and the Restless: Eric Forrester (John McCook) crossed over to warn Michael Baldwin (Christian LeBlanc) about Sheila Carter. (August 11, 2005)
- The Bold and the Beautiful: While eating lunch at the Café Russe in Los Angeles, Katherine Chancellor (Jeanne Cooper) was approached by Massimo Marone (Joseph Mascolo). Massimo introduced her to friend Stephanie Douglas Forrester (Susan Flannery), the daughter of an old business acquaintance (John Douglas) belonging to Katherine. It was learned that Katherine was the actual owner of Forrester Creations, via the Stephanie Douglas Trust, which her associate's daughter sought to reclaim from her estranged husband (Eric Forrester). With Katherine's blessing, Stephanie achieved her goal, leaving the grand dame of Genoa City free to focus on her numerous other assets. (October 31 – November 1, 2005)
- The Young and the Restless: Eric Forrester (John McCook) crossed over to Genoa City, Wisconsin, a second time to attend the wedding of Michael Baldwin and Lauren Fenmore. (December 9 – 12, 2005)
- Lauren's mother, Joanna Manning (Susan Seaforth Hayes), appeared on both The Bold and the Beautiful and The Young and the Restless (the latter in December to attend her daughter's wedding to Michael Baldwin).

==== 2006 ====
- The Young and the Restless: In November Amber Moore (Adrienne Frantz) arrived in Genoa City to stay. (November 13, 2006)

==== 2007 ====
- The Bold and the Beautiful: Lauren Fenmore appeared in January 19–22, 2007.
- The Bold and the Beautiful: Ashley Abbott (Eileen Davidson) crossed over in early March when Eric Forrester put plans in motion to launch a fragrance line for his new fashion house, Forrester Originals. (March 9, 2007)
- The Bold and the Beautiful: Traci (Beth Maitland), Ashley Abbott's sister, also appeared in March, while talking to her sister on the telephone. (March 20, 2007)
- The Bold and the Beautiful: Abby Carlton (Darcy Rose Byrnes) joined Ashley in Los Angeles. (May 11, 2007)
- The Bold and the Beautiful: Christine Blair (Lauralee Bell) arrived in Los Angeles in June to defend Ridge Forrester (Ronn Moss) after he was arrested for the murder of Shane McGrath (Dax Griffin). Christine got the charges dropped after Rick Forrester's (Kyle Lowder) testimony. The Forresters thanked Christine and she returned to Genoa City. (June 12–21, 2007)
- The Young and the Restless: Brooke Logan (Katherine Kelly Lang), while at her office in Los Angeles, received a phone call from Cane Ashby (Daniel Goddard) regarding his wife, Amber Moore. Brooke filled Cane in on her history with Amber, leaving Cane with even more questions about his marriage. (July 5, 2007)
- The Young and the Restless: Ashley Abbott (Eileen Davidson) returned to visit her brother Jack Abbott and Victor Newman for the new year. (December 28, 2007 – January 3, 2008)

==== 2008 ====
- The Young and the Restless: Eric Forrester (John McCook) met with Jack Abbott in February about the magazine Restless Style at Forrester Creations. During that same trip to Los Angeles, Jack and his wife, Sharon Abbott (Sharon Case), paid a visit to Ashley Abbott (Eileen Davidson) and Abby Carlton (Darcy Rose Byrnes). (February 26–28, 2008)
- The Young and the Restless: In March, Ashley Abbott (Eileen Davidson) and Felicia Forrester (Lesli Kay) flew to Genoa City for the launch of the magazine Restless Style. (March 25–26, 2008)
- The Young and the Restless: Felicia Forrester (Lesli Kay) crossed over in April on recurring status. (April 8, 2008-August 2008)
- The Young and the Restless: Ashley Abbott (Eileen Davidson) crossed over at the end of June to attend the wedding of Victor Newman and Sabrina Costelana. Her daughter with Victor, Abigail "Abby" Carlton, was also in attendance as a flower girl. While back in Genoa City, Ashley was shocked to learn that Nikki Newman had beaten Victor to the punch; her brother, Jack Abbott, had allowed their former stepmother, Gloria Bardwell, to move into the pool-house; and that Jack and his wife, Sharon Abbott, were about to redecorate her childhood home. (June 19–23, 2008)

==== 2009 ====
- The Young and the Restless: In July Deacon Sharpe (Sean Kanan) arrived in Genoa City to stay.

==== 2010 ====
- The Bold and the Beautiful: Amber Moore (Adrienne Frantz) returns from Genoa City to Los Angeles when Whip Jones asks her to work as a fashion designer at Jackie M, on July 1, 2010.

==== 2011 ====
- The Bold and the Beautiful: Olivia Barber Winters (Tonya Lee Williams) attends wedding of her cousin, Justin Barber (Aaron D. Spears) and Donna Logan (Jennifer Gareis).

==== 2013 ====
- The Young and the Restless: In March Eric Forrester crossed over for two episodes for Victor's and Nikki's wedding. (March 18, 2013 – March 19, 2013)
- The Young and the Restless: In May Oliver Jones (Zack Conroy) crossed over for two episodes. (May 21, 2013)

==== 2014 ====
- The Young and the Restless: In April Rick Forrester (Jacob Young) and Caroline Spencer (Linsey Godfrey) crossed over for two episodes. (April 14, 2014)
- The Bold and the Beautiful: Gloria Abbott Bardwell appeared in November for a fashion show at Forrester Creations. (November 20, 2014)

==== 2015 ====
- The Young and the Restless: The Forresters were mentioned by Devon Hamilton while planning for his wedding to Hilary Curtis.

==== 2020 ====
- The Young and the Restless: Courtney Hope (Sally Spectra) crossed over in November 2020 on a full-time basis.

==== Possible connection ====
- Robert Clary played Pierre Roulland on The Young and the Restless from 1973 to 1974, before playing Pierre Jourdan on The Bold and the Beautiful from 1990 to 1992.

=== CBS Daytime game shows—The Price Is Right and Let's Make a Deal ===
- 2002
  - The Bold and the Beautiful: Host Bob Barker and the Models of The Price Is Right appeared to discuss the new fashion line by Amber Moore.
- 2008
  - The Price Is Right: Bridget Forrester (Ashley Jones) makes an appearance during the Showcase to offer a contestant a spot as an extra for a segment. The contestant won the Showcase.
    - Immediately after the contestant won, she was whisked away to Studio 31 for hair, makeup, and wardrobe before taping her segment. The segment was later posted on the Web site for the two shows.
- 2009
  - The Price Is Right: Dominick Marone (Jack Wagner) interrupts taping of Price (which is taped in the Studio 33; The Bold and the Beautiful is taped next door in Studio 31) on March 6. Wagner talks to Carey about soap appearances and "crashes" the taping. At the end of the show, a Marone-themed Showcase is presented.
  - The Bold and the Beautiful: Donna Logan (Jennifer Gareis) and Pam Douglas (Alley Mills) take a trip to The Price is Right in June, and to their surprise Donna becomes a contestant, ultimately winning both showcases.
  - The Price Is Right: Dominick Marone (Jack Wagner) and Bridget Forrester (Ashley Jones) appear together on June 19 to model wedding attire during a special "Ultimate Wedding Shower" edition of The Price is Right.
- 2010
  - The Price Is Right and The Young and the Restless: Stephen Logan (Patrick Duffy) and Jack Abbott (Peter Bergman) appear in a war of words in a One Bid, then each present their own themed Showcase at the end of the show.
- 2011
  - The Price Is Right: A contestant on the March 2011 Ultimate Spring Break episode wins a walk-on role as an extra; that episode airs April 19 and is linked to the Web site of the show.
  - The Price Is Right: Thomas Forrester (Adam Gregory) models wedding attire for the Ultimate Wedding Shower episode along with show model Rachel Reynolds. The wedding attire is a prize on this episode.
- 2012
  - The Bold and the Beautiful: Tiffany Coyne meets the Forresters and Pam Douglas (Alley Mills), asking Pam and Nick to appear on Let's Make a Deal. Dominick Marone (as a lobster) and Pam Douglas (as a fisherman) appear in a deal.
  - Let's Make a Deal: Wagner appears to offer a contestant a walk-on role on the show, a common practice now with both CBS Daytime game shows with this show.
- 2013
  - The Price Is Right: Starting with Season 42, guest models often appear on the show. B&B stars Karla Mosley and Lawrence Saint-Victor appear as models after this practice begins, which continues into Season 43 (2014–15).
  - The Bold and the Beautiful: Former Executive Producer for both CBS Daytime game shows Mike Richards, and models Rachel Reynolds (Price) and Danielle Demski (Deal; substitute model for most of 2013–14) are employees of Forrester Creations, meeting with Thorne (Winsor Harmon) and Ally (Ashlyn Pearce).

=== Big Brother houseguest appearances ===
Numerous former Big Brother houseguests have guest starred, occasionally making references to their time in the house.

== See also ==
- List of The Bold and the Beautiful cast members
- List of The Bold and the Beautiful characters
- CBS Daytime
