= Jack Abbott (The Young and the Restless) =

Fictional character from The Young and the Restless

- The Young and the Restless character
- Peter Bergman as Jack Abbott
- Portrayed by: Terry Lester (1980–1989); Brett Porter (1986); Peter Bergman (1989–present); Graham Taylor (2017–2018)
- Duration: 1980–present
- First appearance: July 22, 1980
- Created by: William J. Bell
- Introduced by: William J. Bell and John Conboy (1980); William J. Bell and Edward J. Scott (1989); Bradley Bell (1998); Michael J. Weithorn (2001); Michele Val Jean and Tracey Thomson (2026) (Note: In addition to Michele Val Jean and Tracey Thomson, other executive producers for Beyond the Gates include Sheila Ducksworth, Lela Coffey, Anna Saalfeld, Julie Hanan Carruthers, Leon W. Russell, and Derrick Johnson.)
- Crossover appearances: The Nanny (1997); The Bold and the Beautiful (1998); The King of Queens (2001); Beyond the Gates (2026)
- Terry Lester as Jack Abbott
In-universe information
- Other names: John Robert Abbott, Jr.
- Occupation: Businessman; Senator of Wisconsin; Soldier
- Father: John Abbott
- Mother: Dina Mergeron
- Sisters: Traci Abbott
- Half-brothers: Eric Vanderway; Billy Abbott
- Half-sisters: Ashley Abbott
- Wife: Patty Williams (1982–1984, 2010); Lindsey Wells (1984); Nikki Newman (1990–1994, 2012); Luan Volien (1995–1996); Phyllis Summers (2001–2004, 2015–2016); Sharon Newman (2007–2009); Diane Jenkins (2023–present)
- Children: Keemo Volien Abbott; John Abbott III; Kyle Abbott
- Stepdaughters: Mai Volien
- Grandchildren: Allie Nguyen; Harrison Abbott
- Grandparents: Robert Abbott
- Uncles: Ivan Abbott
- Nephews: Theo Vanderway; Johnny Abbott
- Nieces: Abby Newman; Colleen Carlton; Delia Abbott; Katie Newman; Ruby Spectra-Abbott

Jack Abbott is a fictional character from the American CBS soap opera The Young and the Restless. The character was introduced in 1980 being portrayed by Terry Lester. Lester departed from the series in 1989 and was replaced by Peter Bergman shortly thereafter. Bergman relocated to California after successfully auditioning for the part. His first episode aired on November 27, 1989. Jack is known for his longstanding feud with the Newman family patriarch, Victor Newman as well as his romances with Diane Jenkins, Nikki Newman, Phyllis Summers, and Sharon Newman. Jack has represented the Abbott family as the patriarch since the 2006 passing of his father, John Abbott.

== Casting ==
The role of Jack Abbott was written into the series on July 22, 1980, being portrayed by Terry Lester. In May 1985, it was announced that Lester would be leaving the role; he stated that it was because of a CBS film (Blade) he starred in which could have possibly become a series: "I wanted to work something out. I've enjoyed being with the show. However, I was concerned about the possibility of Blade being picked up as a series and being tied to The Young and the Restless." However, he ended up staying. Brett Porter briefly portrayed the role in 1986. The writers picked up on Lester having "played with Jack's dialogue" according to his intuitions. In 1989, Lester quit out of anger, as he felt that Jack was being "squeezed" out of the storyline, and was upset that Lauralee Bell's character Christine Blair was moved to the forefront of several storylines. Lester made his last appearance on September 1, 1989. The producers immediately began exploring recast options. At the time, Bergman, who had risen to super stardom as Dr. Cliff Warner on All My Children, had recently been fired. Bergman's firing made headlines, and Melody Thomas Scott, who portrays Nikki Newman, suggested Bergman as Jack to her husband and former executive producer Edward J. Scott when she read of the news in Soap Opera Digest. Bergman revealed that the producers had contacted his agent and asked about his height; he initially thought it was a joke. They then inquired about Bergman's feelings about replacing someone, and he was hesitant to take the role. He stated in 2009: "I was on All My Children and replacing someone was sheer death, and it never worked on All My Children." When the producers called him again, he decided it "couldn't hurt" to audition. Scott arranged for Bergman to come to California and audition with Jerry Douglas and Jess Walton, who portrayed John and Jill Abbott respectively. After a successful audition, Bergman was offered the part. Bergman reluctantly relocated to California after accepting the part. He made his debut on November 27, 1989. Other actors were considered for the role, including Jon Lindstrom, who screen tested for William J. Bell, which was later broadcast on an episode of 48 Hours.

In 1997, Bergman appeared as Jack on an episode of the popular CBS series The Nanny entitled "The Heather Biblow Story". In the episode, he shared a kiss with fellow guest star Pamela Anderson. Bergman also guest starred as Jack on another of the network's comedy series' The King of Queens; he appeared in the episode "Inner Tube" along with fellow cast members Melody Thomas Scott and Scott Reeves (who portrayed Ryan McNeil).

In December 1998, Bergman’s character appeared on The Bold and the Beautiful in a crossover event. Bergman’s appearances on the show were December 24 and 28, 1998. In 2006, Bergman stated: "I love what I do! I get a new script every day, and I can't wait to find out what happens next. I've been doing this for 18 years, and I still can't wait to see what Jack has in store for us next."

On January 27, 2026, it was announced Bergman would crossover to Beyond the Gates as Jack. This event is scheduled to air from June 9 to June 12 of the same year.

== Development ==
=== Characterization ===
Jack is very passionate about everything. He doesn't do anything in a small way. This also goes with how he falls in love. These were all really clear choices I made with Jack. I have learned over time that there is a kind of snide nature to Jack. He felt himself above everybody, smug.

— Bergman on his portrayal of Jack.

While he was in the role, Lester stated that Jack was a villain, but not entirely: "I think Jack has changed in the past four years, although there's a tendency to make him the same old circus villain he was in the beginning. Happily the producers, the writers and myself were able to keep Jack progressing - never a wonderful person, but not nasty just to be nasty." Of the character, Bergman stated that: "Jack goes from tender, loving scenes at the beginning of an episode with Nikki, where he's so pathetic and loving and sincere, to taking someone's head off by Act 5. Jack is mercurial that way. He can be in a perfectly good mood and you scuff his shoe and he wants to kill you. I don't have any problems supporting that with real emotions."

According to Bergman, "Jack is not annoyed by the 'little people' ever." Though Jack is a villain, Bergman "wanted Jack to have Achilles heels." Jack spends majority of his life longing for "a solid happy family." Bergman's first lines as Jack on the show were "Smiling Jack is back. No more Mr. nice guy." Jack has always had trouble finding and keeping the right woman. When compared to his former alter ego Cliff Warner, Bergman explained: "It is quite the contrast, the guy who found his one true love, followed by the most unlucky-in-love guy out there, someone who can't seem to hold on to it. Love is just out of his grasp." During his 20th anniversary reflection, Bergman described Jack as "a reckless, selfish, uncaring cad" changed by love. Jack's playboy issues stem from missing his mother. Bergman stated that Jack's unfaithfulness was a way of unconsciously punishing all women for his mother abandoning him.

For Bergman's portrayal of Jack, Mamie Johnson (Veronica Redd) is his "Achilles heel". Mamie is the woman who has been around since he was a child, even when his mother isn't. Jack cannot get anything past Mamie; Bergman said that she "saw right through him". However, John fills the role of father and mother for Jack which makes him a "therefore larger than life figure in Jack's life." Bergman described John as Jack's "rudder" or "consciousness." So when John dies, Jack feels alone. Soon after, Jack begins seeing John's ghost. According to Bergman, Jack is "so desperate to keep his dead dad around, he keeps conjuring him up!"

=== Relationships ===
Your original question was there one true love. There are three. Each of these three women were the loves of his life, and he is never completely comfortable if he is standing in a room with any one of them.

— Bergman on the loves of Jack's life (2009)

Bergman stated that Jack's three most significant romances with Nikki Newman (Melody Thomas Scott), Phyllis Summers (Michelle Stafford) and Sharon Newman (Sharon Case) helped to reform him. Jack goes after Nikki initially for business and revenge. He intends to get Nikki to fall for him and then use her to get Jabot Cosmetics back from Victor. Jack's plan to bargain for the company by using Nikki backfires when he falls for her. Jack falls hard and is at "his most vulnerable" with Nikki. Though quite a few women fall victim to Jack's philandering ways, Nikki forgives him. When they lose their son in March 1993, Bergman said that, "Jack learned empathy for the first time in his life." Jack usually has a lot of control over his life, but he cannot save Nikki from her addiction; in fact, he makes it worse. By the time the relationship does fall apart, "[Jack] is still a cad, but not as bad as before."

These two people should have never been left in the same room together! They were perfectly wrong for each other, and yet both came out of the relationship as better people. Here's a situation where two people, who are truly, deeply in love with each other and can't make it work.

— Bergman, on Jack and Phyllis (2009)

Jack has a long-standing relationship with Phyllis Summers. Bergman described Jack and Phyllis's pairing as one of his "least likely pairings", stating that Jack and Phyllis are the complete "opposite of star-crossed". Despite divorcing after only three years, the couple remains close. Phyllis ends up having an affair with Nicholas Newman (Joshua Morrow), resulting in a pregnancy. Bergman said that, "It truly hurts him. He's in pain" when he sees Phyllis pregnant. Following Phyllis's betrayal, Bergman felt Jack changes again, "in a big way", and that he becomes very "complex".

Jack then begins a romance with Nick's ex-wife, Sharon Newman, who was also hurt by the affair. Of the decision to pair the characters, Bergman said that it may have been an "ill-conceived last resort" after the Phyllis and Nick pairing. The co-stars decided to make the relationship work. Bergman revealed that he and Case made the "concerted effort to turn this relationship into something". Of the relationship, Bergman said: "It is only appropriate that Jack and Sharon found each other. Wherever Sharon goes, she is embarrassed. Will Phyllis come walking around the corner? But Sharon doesn't have any reason to be embarrassed with Jack." However, Bergman also noted that his intimacy with Sharon "all happens so quickly. Jack is doing something manipulative." He also noted that Jack is attracted to Sharon's "simple honesty". The only thing Sharon wants in return is honesty, and Jack cannot give it to her. Sharon is the closest Jack's ever come to having a solid family unit. Though the relationship only last three and half years, Sharon is there for Jack during the death of his father and his niece, Colleen (Tammin Sursok).

Jack has had other various romances. In 1994, Jack became romantically involved with newly introduced character Mari Jo Mason (Diana Barton), after a "year of going" it solo without a love interest. Nancy Reichardt of The Tuscaloosa News noted that Jack was back "romantically speaking", finding love again. However, Mari had a hidden past; a relationship with Blade Bladeson (Michael Tylo), who was married to his sister Ashley Abbott (Eileen Davidson). Bergman said he was "having fun" playing out the storyline, but speaking of Mari, he said: "I uík quite make out whether she's a big event in Jack's life or a big event in Blade Bladeson's life ... I certainly love the idea that it's a convoluted a story as it is." Bergman said that he is happy that Jack is "feeling saucy again", stating: "I like Jack being on the prowl. I like the energy Jack gets to play. It's different from what I've been playing for some time." Of working with a newly cast soap opera actress, Bergman said it could be difficult working with someone lacking "technical experience" but at the same time, praised Barton's work. The romance failed.

=== Rivalries ===
Following a 2006 storyline which saw the Abbott children team up against their late father's wife Gloria Fisher (Judith Chapman), Bergman said: "It's almost laughable that anyone feels sorry for Gloria." He said that "a woman died possibly because of her malfeasance (Gloria tainted Ashley's skin cream sample), and we're feeling sorry for her? Not to mention how she changed the last part of John's life: He spent the last month of his life in prison." Bergman, however, stated that Jack changed after his father's passing; all he wanted was to regain the family company, Jabot Cosmetics and would do anything good or bad to get it. Bergman said: "Jack changed at the funeral. A switch changed immutably the day John died. John was Jack's moral compass. Now he's not encumbered by that course of right and wrong. There are not too many places he won't go to protect his family."

=== Doppelgänger ===
Can you imagine what it feels like to get out of jail and suddenly be Jack Abbott? Life with the beautiful Phyllis. The luxury. The expendable cash. It's a candy store! And he can't get enough of it fast enough. And unlike Jack, who is the ultimate in restraint when it comes to clothes, this guy likes things loud ... Fake Jack has a very large appetite for life. He's very careless, but even when he makes a mistake, he's confident he can fix it.

— Bergman on Fake Jack, TV Insider

In April 2015, it is revealed that there are two Jacks, one being Jack himself and another being Marco Annicelli, a doppelgänger hired by Victor. On-Air On-Soaps noted that there was much speculation leading up to the reveal, observing that "Many in the audience guessed it". Bergman took on dual roles, the first time he had done this in his career. The actor said that he was "having a ball" playing two characters, saying: "The challenge is to make it entertaining and the best way to do that is to make a lot of it funny, and we do." Luke Kerr of Daytime Confidential wrote: "[Victor] went shopping at Moguls-R-Us and came home with a shiny, new Jack Abbott (Peter Bergman) doppelganger, whom he's unleashed on Genoa City." Little is known about Fake Jack upon his introduction to the soap opera, apart from the fact that he was found by Victor in a Peruvian prison, although Bergman speculated that the character "is quite literally a doppelgänger, that lookalike we all supposedly have walking around on the planet somewhere". The character is described as a "loose cannon". Bergman also told TV Insider that Fake Jack "likes to wear bright stuff. [Laughs] I've been having a ball with the people in the wardrobe department!"

== Storylines ==
=== Backstory ===
John Robert Abbott, Jr. known commonly as Jack, was born on June 29, 1954 to Dina Abbott and John Abbott. He has two younger sisters, Ashley and Traci. Dina walks out on the family when Jack is only thirteen. John is left to raise their children on his own with assistance from housekeeper and nanny, Mamie Johnson (Marguerite Ray, and Veronica Redd). At the age of 19, Jack travels to Vietnam to serve in the army where he falls in love with a young Vietnamese woman known as Mai Yun. At war's end, Jack is forced to evacuate Mai Yun's village and loses contact with his soul mate. After graduating from college, Jack attends Harvard Business School where he becomes captain of the debate team. Jack graduates with an MBA and also gains the reputation of a playboy.

=== 1980–present ===
In the early 1980s, Jack begins working alongside Jill Foster, who is dating his father John. When John ends the relationship, Jill begins dating Jack. This causes tension between all three of them, and Jill and Jack split up as well. Jill files a sexual harassment suit against Jack and wins $10,000. By 1982, Jill and John reunite and get married. Shortly thereafter, Jack marries Patty Williams in an effort to convince his father to make him president of Jabot. However, Jack begins an affair with Jabot model Diane Jenkins. Diane continuously threatens to tell Patty about the affair to get her way. Once upset with Jack, Diane arranges to have Patty walk in on her and Jack having sex, and in the process causes Patty to miscarry her baby. When Patty overhears Jack admitting that he only married Patty to get ahead in his career, Patty shoots him. She loses her memory of the incident, and when she regains her memory Jack chooses not to press charges.

Next Jack has an affair with his now-stepmother Jill. Jack's ex-girlfriend, Lindsey Wells takes pictures and blackmails him into marrying her in 1985. Jack retrieves the photos and reveals that the marriage is invalid. Lindsey then sells the remaining pictures to Katherine Chancellor, who makes them into a puzzle and sends it piece by piece to John. John throws Jack out of the Abbott Mansion and divorces Jill. When Jill is found shot, Jack, John and Katherine are among the main suspects. Jack originally confesses in order to prevent his affair with Jill from going public, but the truth comes out that the killer was a masseur named Sven from the Genoa City Hotel. In the late 1980s, Jack and Victor Newman hire Leanna Love to write a biography on Victor. Unknowingly to Jack, Leanna adds a chapter that exploits the affair between Victor and Jack's sister Ashley Abbott. Victor believes Nikki Newman is behind the publication, and divorces her. He marries Leanna, which is later declared invalid. Victor eventually returns to Nikki, and gains reigns over Jabot Cosmetics. Victor fires Jack and replaces him with Brad Carlton. In response, Jack spitefully marries Nikki, who is again estranged from Victor.

Problems arise early in Jack and Nikki's marriage, and Nikki soon develops addictions to painkillers and alcohol. Following an argument with Victor, Nikki's child, to be named John Abbott III, is stillborn. Victor offers Jack a chance to regain control of Jabot if he leaves Nikki, to which Jack agrees. Victor helps Nikki deal with her addiction, and they reconnect. By 1994, Jack and Nikki divorce but remain close friends. Shortly after the divorce, Jack marries Luan Volien Abbott, a woman he had a relationship with during the Vietnam war. Luan had been living in the United States, looking for her son Keemo Volien. Once found, Luan and Keemo had moved to Genoa City, where they connected with Jack. Luan develops a terminal illness, which she keeps from Jack. Jack inadvertently finds out but keeps her secret. When Luan passes away, Keemo leaves town. A grieving Jack becomes involved with Mari Jo Mason, but disowns her upon discovering she shot Victor. In 1997, Diane returns to Genoa City and begins another romance with Jack. They quickly become engaged, but Ashley Abbott tries to push Diane away. Victor hires Diane to design a building and suddenly seems to be romancing her. Diane breaks off the engagement with Jack and marries Victor. When Nikki is shot, Victor convinces Diane to allow a divorce so he can marry Nikki on her deathbed. However, Nikki lives and Victor stays with her, leading Diane to return to Jack. However, Diane learns that Jack is only using her in his war against Victor, and she leaves him again.

Meanwhile, Jack plots with Brad Carlton to take over Newman Enterprises while Victor is being held captive in New Mexico, and succeeds. When Victor returns, Jack offers to return Jabot in exchange for Newman. Victor counters that Jabot must be purchased to close the deal, and Brash & Sassy would stay with Newman. The Abbots try to raise the funds, but Jack has to accept a loan for the remainder. Victor buys all the Abbott loans and is about to control Jabot again, but backs down due to his renewed involvement with Jack's sister Ashley. However, Victor still plots revenge against Jack and Brad.

In 2000, despite Diane's divorce from Victor, she remained affectionate towards Victor, and she stole Victor's sperm intending to impregnate herself with his child. After a round of thefts by Nikki and Ashley before regaining it, in a twist of fate, Diane ends up pregnant with Jack's son through his own sperm bank donation. Jack later begins romancing Phyllis Summers; they marry however, it is revealed that Diane's son is his. Their marriage was at risk, as Diane tried to use Kyle to get Jack back. She moves in the Abbott pool house and develops a bitter rivalry against Phyllis. Diane sets the pool house on fire to frame Phyllis, and she is sent to jail for arson and attempted murder. She is freed and Jack and Phyllis gain custody of Kyle; but later hand Kyle back to Diane.

Cosmetics War between Jabot and Newman Enterprises began. Jack was from Jabot and his wife, Phyllis, worked for the rivals Newman. Phyllis decided to side with Victor and Newman, ending their marriage. Jack was fired from Jabot as a result of a lawsuit against the company. He was once again single, and briefly romanced Jill again. Jack and Ashley are against their father's new wife Gloria Fisher, who they believed is a gold digger. John is sent to prison for murdering Gloria's ex-husband Tom Fisher. With John in prison and not at the mansion to protect her, Gloria grew tired of the way Jack and Ashley treated her and vowed to get even. She contaminated a new skin product Ashley was working on with cleaning solution. Gloria asked for a sample to show everyone her facial burns. Women ended up dying after using the cream. Jabot's reputation was ruined.

In prison, John began going off the rails. Jack took this opportunity to make John cut out Gloria from his will, making John believe it was Dina. John was released early due to being ill, but was rushed to hospital and died. Jack and his siblings manipulated the funeral's time so that Gloria wouldn't be there. They also kick Gloria out of the mansion. It is discovered that John actually left Gloria fifty percent of his billion dollar estate. The Abbotts were livid when Gloria continued to climb up the corporate ladder at Jabot. Jack begins dating Nick's ex-wife Sharon Newman and they eventually marry in April 2007. Jack runs against Nikki for Wisconsin State Senate and wins with the help of Phyllis and Sharon scheming against Nikki. He has a rocky career as a senator, and ultimately resigns in December because of various events that ultimately lead to a senatorial ethics hearing including Victor's public release of a private conversation between Jack and Ji Min Kim. Nick, Phyllis, Jack and Sharon begin a magazine entitled Restless Style which becomes a huge success. However, eventually Sharon and Jack leave the company. Sharon and Jack eventually divorce after his part in forging a diary to implicate Victor for murder. He romances Mary Jane Benson, who is eventually revealed to be his psycho ex, Patty. Patty wreaks havoc and shoots Victor three times, nearly killing him. Patty manages to escape town with the help of Adam Newman.

Aided by Tucker McCall, Jack regained control of Jabot and also had an affair with Adam's wife Skye Newman. Jack used Abby to file a lawsuit against Victor. Later, Diane returned to town with Kyle. Jack pushed her away although she wanted him, and she had romances with Tucker, Nick and remarried Victor. Jack later got involved with Genevieve Atkinson and they eventually were engaged. However, Patty returned and was posing as Genevieve's burnt maid. He was enraged at her when she used her holding company to gain control of Beauty of Nature. when Genevieve left Jack at the altar, only for Patty to take her place in her wedding dress. Patty shot Jack and was sent to prison; Jack had to have surgery which nearly ended his life. He was left paralyzed. During his ordeal, Nikki supported him greatly and they rekindled their romance. They eventually were married. However, Victor went missing following the wedding and Nikki left Jack to find him, ending the marriage after only two days. Sharon took control of Newman while Victor was missing and stock prices fell. Jack was able to gain enough stock to own the company, which he nearly renamed Abbott Enterprises.

Jack had to undergo another risky surgery to remove the bullet which was still inside of him, which made him temporarily step away from Newman and give Adam the position in his absence. He rekindled his friendship with Phyllis, leading to a kiss. Jack continues to struggle with his pains from the surgery, and became dependent on pain killers. In a bid to gain his company back, Victor fed information to the Genoa City Chronicle about Jack's pill addiction problems, further distressing him. Jack relapsed and woke up New Year's Day to find a dead prostitute, and the daughter of a congressman, on his floor. Adam got rid of the body, a setup by Victor, and Jack went to rehab. Phyllis helped him get through withdrawal.

Nikki told Jack about her multiple sclerosis diagnosis and he encouraged her to share the news with Victor. Later, Congressman Wheeler put a hit on Victor, so Jack and Victor worked together to prove Wheeler was involved in the death of Belinda Rogan.

Jack and Phyllis moved in together. Phyllis revealed to Jack that he was Summer's real dad and all three grew closer. After a fall at the MS Gala, Phyllis needed brain surgery, but was never able to tell Jack that Sharon had switched the results and Nick was really Summer's father before she slipped into a coma. Jack put a ring on Phyllis' finger and considered them engaged. Summer and Jack began to connect.

Jack regularly flew to Georgia to be with Phyllis, who was still in a coma. He also kept everyone together when his niece Delia was killed in a hit-and-run accident.

Jack and his team realized a Chancellor subsidiary was illegally selling pills online, which put Summer in the hospital. Jack was able to get an investigation launched.

Adam asked Jack to be his son Connor's godfather. Jack agreed. Adam admitted Victor was blackmailing him but wouldn't tell Jack why. When Adam was thought to have been killed, Jack urged Chelsea to keep Connor away from Victor.

His assistant Hilary Curtis spontaneously kissed him at the Delia Project Valentine's Day Benefit, but he seemed more intrigued with Kelly Andrews. A hostage situation arose at the gala and he was able to negotiate Chelsea's release. After he learned Kelly had sex with his brother Billy, he offered her money to leave town. Insulted, she tore the check up in his face. Jack began running into Kelly around town and eventually she softened toward him and they began dating. Summer was initially upset that Jack was 'giving up' on her mom, but she eventually came to accept that Jack couldn't be expected to wait for something that might never happen. Jack and Kelly weathered Summer running off with fugitive Austin, and later marrying him. Jack, who had seen Kelly hugging Ben, learned that they were siblings with a family secret. When Jack decided it was time to move on with Kelly officially, he paid the comatose Phyllis a visit to say goodbye. Jack and Kelly later told Summer together about their decision and that Kelly had moved into the Abbott mansion. She was accepting, but vowed never to give up hope for Phyllis' recovery.

Jack and Kelly were attending Nick and Sharon's wedding when Phyllis appeared dressed in a white dress in the church. Jack rushed to her side as she collapsed and went with her to the hospital. Jack arrived at home to find Kelly moving out. They had sex, but she left in the morning. Jack then brought Phyllis home from the hospital and due to the doctor's warnings, elected not to tell her about Kelly right away. Phyllis brought out the truth about Summer's paternity, and she and Jack told Summer that Nick, not Jack, was her biological father together. Jack was angry with Phyllis for not telling him before luring Sharon back to the scene of the crime for a public reveal and took up with Kelly at the club for comfort. Resigned to telling Phyllis he and Kelly were now together, Jack headed home to find Phyllis, who had discovered the truth on her own after stealing Jack's phone, wanting to cement their commitment. Jack proposed and had sex with Phyllis, who declared she would have Kelly Andrews plan their engagement party. Jack prepared to tell Kelly he was engaged to Phyllis, but her mother had a heart attack. Kelly assumed Jack had told Phyllis about them.

In 2016, Phyllis cheats on Jack, with his half brother, Billy, leading them to divorce when Jack learns of this in September. After his divorce, Jack finds ways to get back to Phyllis, but focuses his attention more on getting back at Billy, such as raising the rent of the company he works for, Brash & Sassy.

Jack spends up to a year showing disregard and dislike to Billy, although Billy tries numerous times to get his relationship with his brother back to where it used to be. However, Jacks attention shifts, when his mother, Dina comes back to town, after selling her company to Devon Hamilton and Neil Winters. This brings up numerous emotions and feelings for Jack, as he has not seen his mother in almost a decade, as well as her walking out on him as a child. However, Jack decides to give his mother a chance, and they spend countless hours with each other. Jack later starts to notice that Dina is not acting as herself, and calls a doctor to examine her. Throughout the examination, Dina becomes frazzled, and Jack frantically ushers the doctor out. Jack and Ashley come to the terms that Dina has Alzheimer's. Jack starts to remember the importance of family, and forgives Billy, and works to fix their relationship. However, Jack's newfound relationship with Nikki Newman finds itself at an end, as she agitates Dina.

== Reception ==
Bergman said that his initial casting was met with criticism when compared to his portrayal of the "nice guy" Cliff Warner on All My Children. Bergman however was able to win over majority of Lester's fans within the first six months of his tenure. He stated: "The All My Children fans were the hardest ones to win over because Cliff was such a nice character." Marla Hart of the Chicago Tribune noted that since joining the soap opera, "Bergman has traded on his pretty-boy image to underscore Jack's less savory side." Jamaica Gleaner news wrote: "It's Jack's humanity that keeps him from being just plain bad. Jack is the anti-hero that you just can't help but root for, especially when viewers get to glimpse Jack's vulnerability." On Jack's rivalry with Victor Newman (Eric Braeden), Allison Waldman of AOL TV said: "After all, their characters' on screen feud has been the stuff of soap legend. Victor and Jack have shared wives, corporations, but mostly, unabashed hatred. They despise each other." In July 2020, Bergman's casting was cited as the best all-time recast on a soap opera, by Soaps.com.

Terry Lester earned four Lead Actor Daytime Emmy nominations for his portrayal (from 1984 to 1987). Peter Bergman has been nominated for the Daytime Emmy Award for Outstanding Lead Actor in a Drama Series 24 times between 1990 and 2025, winning in 1991, 1992, and 2002.

In 2022, Charlie Mason from Soaps She Knows placed Jack fourth on his list of the best 25 characters from The Young and the Restless, commenting "The loverboy who's worked so hard to fill father John's shoes — as well as so many a lady's bed! — may never best his rival at No. 2 [Victor] on this list. Nonetheless, Peter Bergman's alter ego (originally played by Terry Lester) remains a vital part of the Genoa City landscape, a natural born Casanova who has no equal. A doppelganger, yes — right, Marco? — but an equal? No."
