= Terry Lester =

American actor (1950–2003)

- Born: April 13, 1950; Indianapolis, Indiana, U.S.
- Died: November 28, 2003 (aged 53)
- Education: DePauw University
- Occupation: Actor
- Years active: 1974–2001

Terry Lester (April 13, 1950 – November 28, 2003) was an American actor. His best known roles include Jack Abbott on The Young and the Restless, Mason Capwell on Santa Barbara (replacing Lane Davies) and Royce Keller on As the World Turns. Lester died due to complications from AIDS on November 28, 2003.

== Early life and education ==
Lester was born in Indianapolis, Indiana. He graduated from Southport High School and began an acting career while at DePauw University.

== Career ==
He starred in the 1976 children's series Ark II, followed by roles in Airport 1975 and the 1978 Kiss movie Kiss Meets the Phantom of the Park.

Lester's big break came when he joined the CBS daytime soap The Young and the Restless in 1980. He originated the role of Jack Abbott, a scoundrel who never met a woman (including his own father's wife) he didn't want to take to bed. Lester was so popular that The Young and the Restless creator William J. Bell wrote an entire family for him. The series was going through a transition period, and many fans believed his star quality helped the show build more viewership rising to #1 in daytime soap ratings.

In spite of his popularity, by the end of the decade Lester felt his role on the show was steadily declining. In 1989, he not only quit but also went to the daytime press and blamed Bill Bell's young daughter, Lauralee Bell (who played Christine Blair), for his dwindling role. He felt the excess airtime given to her came at the expense of both himself and other actors. Lester switched to NBC to take over the role of Mason Capwell on Santa Barbara for a year. In November 1992, he joined As the World Turns to play the charming Royce Keller, who was soon revealed to be suffering from multiple personalities which caused him to kill his own sister in the series. The role was complex, causing raves for Lester, but the headwriter behind the story, Douglas Marland, died suddenly in 1993, and Lester once again found his screentime diminishing. He left the series on May 5, 1994.

The remainder of his professional life consisted of appearances in primetime shows such as Walker, Texas Ranger and Star Trek: Voyager along with various tours in musicals and plays.

== Filmography ==
Roles in television and film
Year	Title	Role	Notes
1974	Airport 1975	Mr. Kelly	Film; uncredited
1975	Barbary Coast	Bret Hollister	Episode: "The Barbary Coast"
1976	Ark II	Jonah	Main role
1978	Kiss Meets the Phantom of the Park	Sam	Television film
1978	Flying High	Billy Bob	Episode: "Swan Song for an Ugly Duckling"
1979	Eight Is Enough	Reed Ellis	Episode: "The Cupid Crisis"
1979	Dallas	Rudy Millington	Episode: "Return Engagement"
1980	Once Upon a Spy	Rudy	Television film
1980–1989	The Young and the Restless	Jack Abbott	Regular role
1985	Blade in Hong Kong	Joe Blade	Television film
1985	Hotel	Chad Wheeler	Episode: "Echoes"
1987	In Self Defense	Dan Edwards	Television film
1989–1990	Santa Barbara	Mason Capwell	Regular role
1992–1994	As The World Turns	Royce Keller	Regular role
1995	Star Trek: Voyager	Haron	Episode: "Maneuvers"
1997	JAG	Chief Petty Officer Fred Holst	Episode: "Rendezvous"
1997	Diagnosis: Murder	Jeffrey Porter	Episode: "Open and Shut"
1999	Walker, Texas Ranger	Earl McMartin	Episode: "Power Angels"

Preceded by First	Jack Abbott (role); 1980–1989	Succeeded by Peter Bergman
