= Don Diamont =

American actor

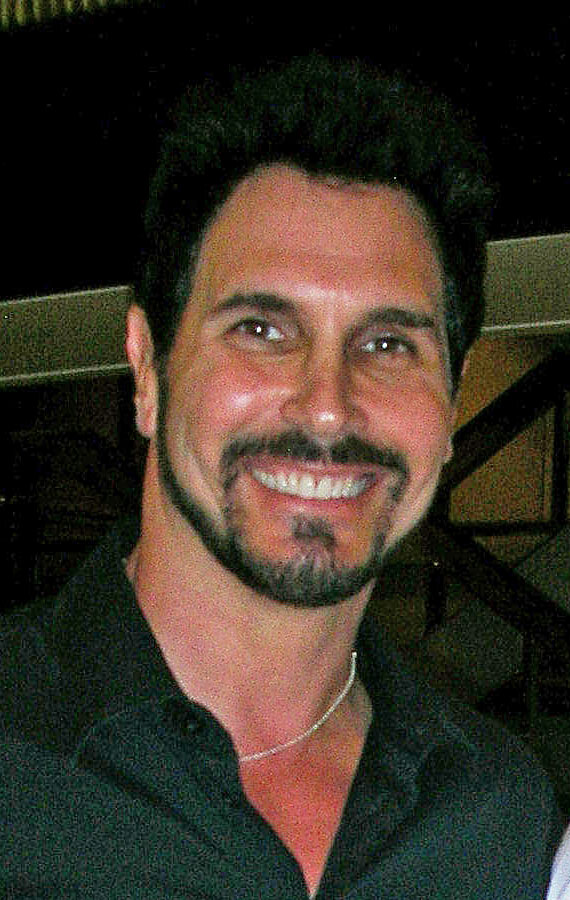
- Diamont in 2010
- Born: Donald Feinberg; December 31, 1962 (age 63); Oceanside, New York, U.S.
- Other name: Donald Diamont
- Occupation: Actor
- Years active: 1984–present
- Known for: The Young and the Restless as Brad Carlton (1985–1996, 1998–2009); The Bold and the Beautiful as Bill Spencer Jr. (2009–present)
- Spouses: Rachel Braun (m. 1994; div. 2002) Cindy Ambuehl (m. 2012)
- Children: 6 including Zander
- Relatives: Judy Diamont (mother)

Don Bruce Diamont (born Donald Feinberg; December 31, 1962) is an American television actor. His best known roles include Brad Carlton on The Young and the Restless and Bill Spencer Jr. on The Bold and the Beautiful. In 1990, Diamont was chosen as one of the 50 most beautiful people in the world by People Magazine, becoming the first daytime actor to receive the honor.

== Career ==
After several years as a successful model, Diamont's first major acting role was as Carlo Forenza on Days of Our Lives. He joined the cast in 1984 after being hired by Ken Corday, and was with the show for a year.

Diamont is best known for his portrayal of opportunistic businessman Brad Carlton on The Young and the Restless. He initially joined the show in 1985 and left the cast in 1996, but returned in 1998, remaining on the show until his character was killed off in early 2009.

On March 5, 2009, it was announced that Diamont would be joining the cast of the CBS daytime drama The Bold and the Beautiful in the contract role of Bill Spencer Jr. His first air date was May 12, 2009. "Don is a versatile actor with a vast range of talent," B&B's Executive Producer and Head Writer, Bradley Bell, said in a statement, "It is my pleasure to welcome him to B&B. He has also expressed an interest in being a script writer."

Diamont is also known for being the spokesperson for Morris Home Furnishings in Dayton, Ohio.

In 2006, Diamont was voted No. 1 on the Sexiest Soap Hunks of All Time list at the Shrine to the Soap Hunks.

Diamont was also a cover model for Playgirl magazine twice, in 1988 and 1995.

He is active with the National Multiple Sclerosis Society, and has a niece afflicted with the illness.

Don was named "Sexiest Veteran Soap Actor" by People Magazine in 2009.

He was in 1995's Sure Ultra Dry commercial campaign.

In 2018 he took part in the cast of the talent show conducted by Milly Carlucci, Ballando con le Stelle (the Italian adaptation of Strictly Come Dancing / Dancing with the Stars)

In 2021, Diamont announced that he would appear on The Young and the Restless as Bill Spencer Jr. in a crossover event and marking his return since Brad Carlton who is the previous cast after 12 years.

== Personal life ==
Diamont is the son of Judy (née Diamont; died 2006) and Albert Feinberg (died 1990). He has three siblings, two sisters Bette (died 1998) and Elena, and one brother, Jack (died 1989).

With his ex-wife Rachel Braun, he had four sons. Two of those, Zander and Luca, played college football for the Indiana Hoosiers and Duke Blue Devils respectively. Diamont married his long-time girlfriend Cindy Ambuehl in Eze, France on June 12, 2012, and they are parents to twin boys Anton and Davis, born December 2003. Diamont also raised his late sister Bette's son and has counted him as a seventh child.

== Filmography ==
=== Film ===
Year	Title	Role	Notes
1992	Unbecoming Age	Alfredo	
1994	A Low Down Dirty Shame	Chad	
1998	The Incredible Adventures of Marco Polo	Marco Polo	
2003	Anger Management	Man in Seat	Credited as Donald Diamont

=== Television ===
Year	Title	Role	Notes
1984	Days of Our Lives	Carlo Forenza	series regular
1985–1996	The Young and the Restless	Brad Carlton	Series regular
1998–2009	The Young and the Restless	Brad Carlton	Series regular
2021	The Young and the Restless	Bill Spencer Jr.	1 episode
1995	OP Center	Brent	Miniseries
1993	The Bold and the Beautiful	Brad Carlton	3 episodes
1995	The Bold and the Beautiful	Brad Carlton	1 episode
2009–present	The Bold and the Beautiful	Bill Spencer Jr.	Series regular
1994	Burke's Law	Cosmo	Episode: "Who Killed the Romance?"
1997	Country Justice	Ray	TV film
1997	High Tide	Mikey	Episode: "Dead Men Don't Snore"
1997	Diagnosis: Murder	Max Halik	Episode: "The Merry Widow Murder"
1998	Loyal Opposition: Terror in the White House	Secret Service Agent John Vendome	TV film
1998	Baywatch: White Thunder at Glacier Bay	Gavin	Video only
