= Victor and Nikki Newman =

Victor and Nikki
- The Young and the Restless character
- Eric Braeden and Melody Thomas Scott as Victor and Nikki
- Duration: 1981–present
- Created by: William J. Bell
- Introduced by: William J. Bell and John Conboy
In-universe information
- Other names: Niktor
- Family: Newman
- Spouse: 1984–1988 • 1998; 2002–2008; 2013–present
- Children: Victoria Newman; Nicholas Newman
- Grandchildren: Cassie Newman (adoptive); Noah Newman; Claire Newman; Summer Newman; Reed Hellstrom; Faith Newman; Johnny Abbott (adoptive); Katie Newman; Connor Newman; Christian Newman

Victor and Nikki Newman are fictional characters and a supercouple from the American CBS soap opera The Young and the Restless. Victor is portrayed by Eric Braeden and Nikki is portrayed by Melody Thomas Scott. Together, they have shared three marriages and two children; Victoria and Nicholas Newman (Amelia Heinle and Joshua Morrow). The couple is often referred to by the portmanteau "Niktor" by fans on internet message boards and in magazines. Nikki was originally from the lower walks of life, having been a prostitute and stripper. After multiple failed relationships, she began a romance with Victor, who taught her about society. Nikki gave birth to Victoria in 1982, and the pair were married in 1984. Ashley Abbott (Eileen Davidson, Brenda Epperson) then came between Victor and Nikki, causing them to divorce and each of them remarrying to Ashley and Victor's nemesis, Jack Abbott (Peter Bergman), respectively. However, the pair continued to be linked to one another, with an affair between the two resulting in second child Nicholas.

The soap opera's writers originally detailed Victor and Nikki to marry and divorce or depart from each other in some form or fashion or continuous cycle, a take on the original supercouple formula. Their pairing, regarded as an "inspired decision", led to Victor and Nikki becoming the most successful supercouple on The Young and the Restless. Despite Victor marrying architect Diane Jenkins (Alex Donnelley) in 1997, Nikki suffered a gunshot wound the following year and came close to death, resulting in Victor supposedly divorcing Diane and remarrying Nikki on her deathbed. However, Victor and Diane's divorce was never legal, invalidating the pair's remarriage. An actual divorce between Victor and Diane took place, resulting in the reunion of Victor and Nikki. In September 2002, they remarried again at the site of their first wedding, which would last six years. In 2008, Nikki began an affair with the devious David Chow (Vincent Irizarry), resulting in the pair's second divorce. Scott has stated that she thinks the couple always has to get back together, but "not without a challenge". In March 2013, after four years of an on-and-off relationship, Victor and Nikki remarried for the third time, coinciding with the 40th anniversary of The Young and the Restless.

Victor and Nikki are recognized as one of daytime television's most prominent pairings, as well as receiving a positive response from critics throughout the years. Scott has also stated that she believes the pair "will always be a huge dynamic". Braeden has stated that he thought Victor and Nikki's storyline was an "honestly felt love story with great material for conflict with Nikki". The News & Advance cited Victor and Nikki with other romances considered "epic" of the early supercouple era.

== Development ==
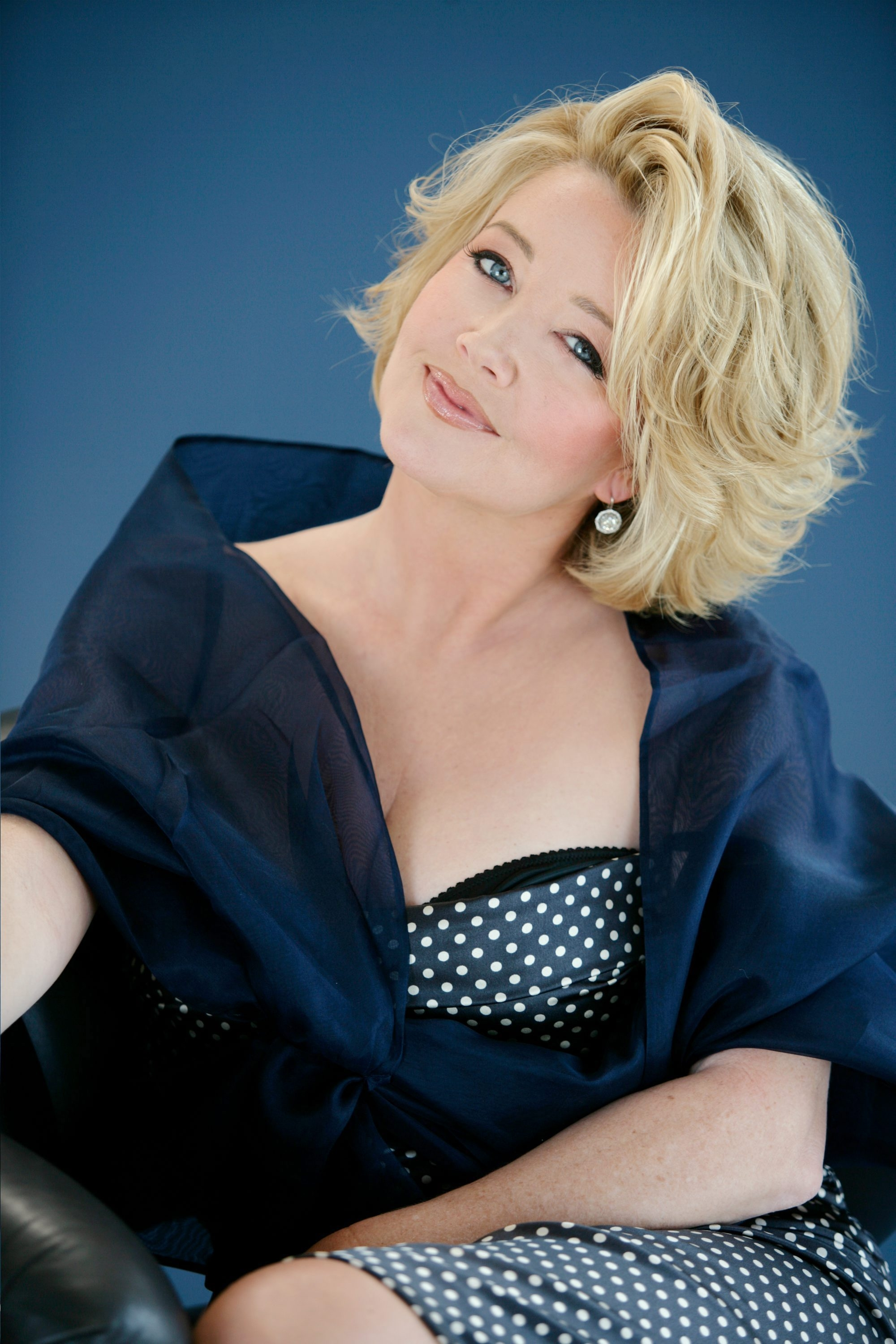
Melody Thomas Scott stated that the couple always get back together.

Nikki was originally from the lower walks of life, having been a stripper. After multiple failed relationships, she began a romance with Victor, who taught her about society. They fell in love and had a baby, Victoria Newman (Heather Tom), and later a son Nicholas Newman (Joshua Morrow). The couple are widely considered a supercouple within the realm of soap operas. The writers of The Young and the Restless detailed characters Victor Newman and Nikki Reed to marry and divorce or depart from each other in some form or fashion in a continuous cycle. This has taken place for as long as the couple has been together, a take on the original supercouple formula. Soap Opera Digest relayed the beginning of the pairing's creation and their impact. The "inspired decision" led to Victor and Nikki becoming the series' most successful supercouple. In an interview with Dose magazine, Melody Thomas Scott said that the couple always has to get back together, but not without a challenge. She stated:

That's the writers' job to come up with something believable. I mean, that is always their challenge. Nikki and Victor have played this cycle over and over again and it’s very successful because people care about them. I would imagine just because I've watched the show for 33 years as well as played it – they've got to get back together! There’s nothing else they could do! They have to get back together, as for how, I don't know. The writers have a rough job coming up with something that I hope will be good!

The characters had their first wedding on the episode that aired on April 13, 1984.

== Storylines ==
=== 1981–2000 ===
Victor Newman met Nikki Reed, who, barely out of her teens, was working as a stripper at the Bayou. Victor was intrigued by her and took her home, where under his influence, she was transformed into a classy young lady. Victor is adamant at first that he has no romantic feelings for Nikki, but he soon succumbed to her charms and they had a night of passionate love-making. Victor cast this off as a mistake, and instead took up with a woman named Lorie Brooks, who in truth only wanted to be with Victor to write an exposé on him. Victor later admitted that he truly is in love with Nikki, and she eventually gives birth to a daughter, Victoria Newman, and the couple was married in a lavish ceremony two years later.

Victor and Nikki in 1982.

One of the greatest threats to Victor and Nikki's union is arguably Ashley Abbott, as some time later, Victor fell in love with her, who happens to be the sister of his archenemy Jack Abbott. Victor was heartbroken in discovering that Ashley had aborted his baby so that he would stay with a dying Nikki. Nikki later recovered, but intentionally hadn't informed Victor to stay clear of the threat Ashley posed. Yet, they share one final night of passion together, which resulted in the birth of Nicholas Newman. Victor and Nikki ended up divorcing after he lashed out at her for purposely providing information about Ashley's abortion to an unauthorized biographer — Leanna Love. Victor marries her, all while being unaware of her true intentions. The marriage is quickly annulled and Victor pays Leanna a settlement, but she remains a bothersome component in Victor's life on occasion. Victor then married Ashley by 1990, but the marriage ended after three years due to extreme marital problems. Nikki married Jack, which ended after four years when Victor told Jack he would give him Jabot Cosmetics if he divorced Nikki.

After Victor was blasted by Nikki, Ashley and teenaged Victoria, all resenting the control he tried to exert in their lives, he left town, and during his trip, he is robbed of his wallet, jewelry, and car. After his car is found with a body inside burned beyond recognition, word reaches Genoa City that Victor is dead. However, Victor turned up at the Kansas farm of the blind Hope Wilson just in time to rescue her from a rapist. After Victor lived with Hope, they grew close, and they returned to Genoa City and married. Afterward, Hope gave birth to a son, Victor Adam Newman, Jr., and shortly after she left Victor. Victor hoped to return to Nikki, but she was engaged to Brad Carlton. After Victor was shot by Mari Jo Mason, Nikki returned to his side until he decided to visit Hope again. By 1997, Victor married architect Diane Jenkins, Jack's ex-fiancée, but when Nikki was shot by her husband's ex-wife Veronica Landers, Victor left Diane to remarry Nikki on her deathbed, and eventually Nikki survived. They realized they wanted to be together, and thus led Victor to divorce Diane, although with his speedy marriage to Nikki, the divorce wasn't legal. Eventually, Diane reluctantly agreed to a legal divorce after she acquired millions in the divorce settlement in a very lengthy divorce. Yet, by that time Victor and Nikki had gone their separate ways again.

=== 2002–2011 ===
Two years later, Victor and Nikki remarried legally at the site of their first wedding. Nikki and Victor again started up the rocky aspect of their romance when Victor's unethical and illegal business practices harm Jabot, as Nikki had made a notable investment there. Nikki started to have horrible flashbacks of accidentally shooting Joshua Cassen when she was five years old, and she was stunned to discover that Joshua was the older brother of her new business associate Bobby Marsino, with whom she has a brief romance. Victor came to Nikki's rescue after Bobby's mob associates kidnapped her. Nikki moved on, and she and Victor partnered with Phyllis Summers to create a chain of Wellness Spas across the country. However, when Victor learns that Nick, married to Sharon Newman, had an affair with Phyllis, Victor fires her and returned to holding the reins of his company.

When Victor suffers a head injury while rescuing Nikki from a carjacking, Victor becomes epileptic. His loved ones were well off at the seemingly new laid-back personality Victor now encompasses, but they soon became worried for his health when he began experiencing seizures. Making things even more complicated, as well as bizarre, he suddenly developed a friendly relationship with his main enemy Jack. Nikki later became concerned that Jack was manipulating a vulnerable Victor for his own personal financial gain. After a while, Victor finally appeared in good health. Victor and Nikki had their ups and downs, but typically manage to find their way back to each other romantically through various situations. Victor's son Victor, Jr. returned to town, now going by Adam Newman. However, they divorce again, and Victor married Victoria's friend Sabrina Costelana, and Nikki married David Chow. The following year, Victor remarried Ashley, but Nikki and Victor reunited after he was shot by Patty Williams and given a heart transplant. They went to Europe, and Victor and Ashley divorced.

Victor returned from Belgium with Nikki on his arm. Victor declared himself as head of Newman Enterprises, and Victor and Nikki move back into their Ranch house, and helped discover and return their kidnapped infant granddaughter Faith Newman back to her parents Nick and Sharon. Adam ends up being found "dead", and Victoria and Nick were arrested. In order to protect his children, Victor takes the blame saying he did it for everything Adam did to his family. Victor is later released and Nick is the main suspect. However, there was a growing amount of proof to suggest that Adam killed Richard Hightower to fake his own death. In order to protect Nick, Victor went to Canada trying to find Adam. There he befriended Meggie McClaine and he ended up nearly being killed. Back at the Newman Ranch, Victor tries to rebuild his relationship with Nikki, but she felt that Meggie was in the way. Victor claimed that he was trying to protect her and she became Nikki's personal assistant. In reality, she put together a scheme to get Nikki drinking again, therefore opening up the way for her to marry Victor. Once she marries him, she would kill him and get his money. Meggie eventually recruits Deacon Sharpe to help spike Nikki's drinks. Eventually, Deacon and Meggie set up Victor and Nikki to look like Nikki and Deacon were having an affair. Once Victor caught them, he sent Nikki to rehab, where Deacon soon ends up to continue scheming with Meggie. In rehab, he tried to actually help Nikki, and their relationship did turn romantic, especially when Meggie was able to elope with Victor. Meggie posted their wedding photo online and Nikki saw it, giving into romance with Deacon. Meggie fully revealed herself as a manipulative gold-digger targeting the Newman fortune as a widow after she mortally eliminates him. After apparently many spiked drinks, Victor appeared to suffer a heart attack, but stunningly unveiled his sobriety and caught her in a sting operation set up by him, Patrick Murphy, and the cops though Nikki didn't know. Meggie was arrested and Victor went to fill in Nikki, but before he did found her in bed with Deacon, blemishing the chances of another marriage. Victor explained that Meggie caused her alcoholic craving by spiking all her drinks to rid her from the ranch and get to him and his money.

=== 2011–present ===
Nikki continued her romance with Deacon, while Victor ended up remarrying Diane Jenkins. Nikki broke up with Deacon after his role in Meggie's scheme came to light, and Victor and Nikki eventually had an affair, but their reunion was short lived. Eventually, Victor sent Nikki back to rehab as her alcoholism issues had resurfaced. After a quick annulment from Victor, Diane posted pictures of him and Nikki in bed online. She was murdered months later. After Nikki returned—having escaped from rehab—memories of Diane's murder caught up with her. She then confessed to being the killer to Victor, who admitted to killing his ex-wife to protect Nikki.

Victor was jailed, and later married Sharon to keep Nikki away from him, though the marriage ended days later. Deacon blackmailed Nikki into marrying him, using fake information about Diane's murder. Nikki agreed, however this marriage was short lived. When Victor was released from jail, the two reunited again.

Victor brought Chelsea Lawson and her mother to town to ruin Victoria's marriage to Billy Abbott. When Nikki learned of this, she left him. Victor then pursued a genuine relationship with Sharon, much to everyone's dismay. Nikki moved on from Victor when she reunited with Jack after eighteen years apart, and ended up marrying him. Hours after this marriage, Victor eloped with Sharon, despite showing up at the wedding and unsuccessfully telling Nikki not to go through with it.

Yet soon after Victor disappeared and ended up in Los Angeles in amnesia. Sharon set out to get revenge by taking over Newman, while Nikki left Jack to try to find Victor. As a result of an explosion, it was believed that Victor died and the family was shocked. Yet, Victor actually survived.

Nikki and Victor reunited, while they set out to destroy Sharon and Tucker McCall who wanted to keep Victor away so he could take over Newman.

== Reception and impact ==
Victor and Nikki are recognized as one of daytime's most prominent couples. The couple has received positive reviews from critics throughout the years, The News & Advance cited Victor and Nikki with other romances considered "epic" of the early supercouple era.

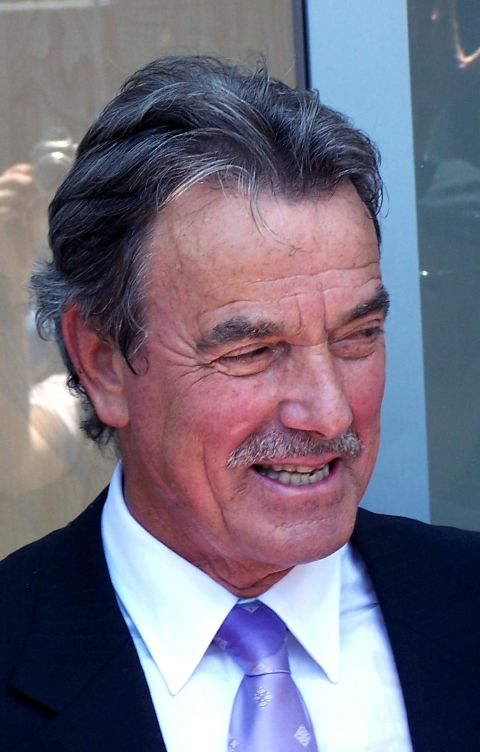
Eric Braeden (pictured) portrays Victor, a vital character to the series.

They have garnered a large fan following, being commonly referred to as "Niktor" on internet message boards. In addition, the couple's weddings have been reported by mainstream media. Melody Thomas Scott has said, "Let’s face facts: Victor and Nikki will always be a huge dynamic, they’ve been in a circular cycle for over 30 years! Finding a new leading man that you have chemistry with is like finding gold." Eric Braeden has said, "I love working with Melody [as well]. I always thought it was an honestly felt love story with great material for conflict with Nikki." Former As the World Turns actress Martha Byrne has said, "Young and Restless' Victor and Nikki are the perfect example of a couple who they can tear apart and put back together how many times? And [the writers] do it really well because they're so stable as characters that you can basically do anything with them now, and the audience will go on the journey with them." Daytime expert Michael Fairman stated: "Victor and Nikki just can’t, we mean can’t, ever get it together long enough to find any happiness with each other. So, many would say that they deserve each other and the baggage and betrayals that come along with their co-dependent relationship."

== See also ==
- List of supercouples
