= Victor Newman =

- The Young and the Restless character
- Portrayed by: Eric Braeden
- Duration: 1980–present
- First appearance: February 8, 1980
- Created by: William J. Bell
- Introduced by: William J. Bell and John Conboy (1980); Bradley Bell (1999); Michele Val Jean and Tracey Thomson (2026) (Note: In addition to Michele Val Jean and Tracey Thomson, other executive producers for Beyond the Gates include Sheila Ducksworth, Lela Coffey, Anna Saalfeld, Julie Hanan Carruthers, Leon W. Russell, and Derrick Johnson.)
- Crossover appearances: Beyond the Gates; The Bold and the Beautiful
In-universe information
- Other names: Christian Miller; Victor Christian Newman
- Occupation: Businessman
- Family: Newman
- Father: Albert Miller
- Mother: Cora Miller
- Brothers: Matt Miller
- Spouse: Julia Newman (1970–1981); Nikki Newman (1984–1988, 1998, 2002–2008, 2013–present); Leanna Love (1988); Ashley Abbott (1990–1993, 2009); Hope Wilson (1994–95); Diane Jenkins (1997–1999, 2011); Sabrina Costelana (2008); Meggie McClaine (2010); Sharon Newman (2012) (Note: Victor and Sharon were married twice in 2012. From January 13–30, 2012, and again from August 2 – October 8, 2012. Both marriages were annulled.)
- Children: Victoria Newman; Nicholas Newman; Adam Newman; Abby Newman
- Stepsons: Dylan McAvoy
- Grandsons: Noah Newman; Reed Hellstrom; Johnny Abbott (adoptive); Connor Newman; Christian Newman; Dominic Abbott Newman Chancellor
- Granddaughters: Cassie Newman (adoptive); Eve Nicole Howard “Claire Grace”; Summer Newman; Faith Newman; Katie Newman

Victor Newman is a fictional character from the American CBS soap opera The Young and the Restless. He has been portrayed by Eric Braeden since 1980. Initially a guest character who was to last for eight to twelve weeks, Victor has evolved into the soap opera's leading male figure. Created by William J. Bell as a "despicable, contemptible, unfaithful wife abuser", the character was planned to be killed off and never heard of again. However, after Bell saw Braeden's performance, he decided to sign the actor onto a contract. Braeden was hesitant to work on a soap opera, but eventually signed a contract, and has remained on the series as a regular cast member for over 45 years. The character is widely described as a ruthless villain, while loving to those he holds dear. Over the years, he has also been the center of several controversial plots and relationships.

Victor arrived in Genoa City, Wisconsin for business, and he eventually formed his own worldwide conglomerate, Newman Enterprises. After his first marriage to Julia Newman (Meg Bennett), he formed a romance with stripper Nikki Reed (Melody Thomas Scott). Their union developed into a supercouple pairing, which has lasted over three decades. He shares two children with Nikki, Victoria (Heather Tom/Amelia Heinle) and Nicholas Newman (Joshua Morrow). During his first marriage to her, he cheated with Ashley Abbott (Eileen Davidson). He has also had a long-standing romantic history with Ashley, and they share a child together, Abby Newman (Melissa Ordway). He was briefly married to a woman named Hope Wilson (Signy Coleman) and they had a son together, Adam Newman (Chris Engen/Michael Muhney/Justin Hartley/Mark Grossman), who grew up without knowledge of Victor being his father. He is also known for his long-standing business rivalry with Jack Abbott (Peter Bergman). Victor has had several other romantic relationships, including one with his former daughter-in-law Sharon Newman (Sharon Case), which was poorly received by the actors and public.

Considered an icon and leading man of the soap opera genre, Braeden's distinct performance of Victor has garnered widespread praise from critics, who have described him as legendary and "enthralling". Victor is famously characterized for his power-hungry ways and low-toned voice. Because of the character's popularity, he was made a spokesperson for the Canadian discount store Zellers. Apart from popularity and critical praise, Braeden has also garnered numerous accolades for his performance; most notably a star on the Hollywood Walk of Fame, presented to him in 2007. He has been nominated at the Daytime Emmy Awards ten times for Outstanding Lead Actor in a Drama Series, having won the award in 1998. He has been pre-nominated three times in this category. Additionally, he was the recipient of the "Favorite Male Performer in a Daytime Serial" award at the 18th Annual People's Choice Awards in 1992.

== Casting and creation ==
William J. Bell created Victor as a short-term non-contractual role, debuting on February 8, 1980. Bell stated in 1997, "[Victor] would last between eight to twelve weeks, at which time he was to be shot by his wife." However, once he saw Braeden's performance, he thought "the voice, the power, the inner strength", and knew he didn't want to lose the actor; "The first thing was to get Eric under contract, but he didn't want to go under contract", he said. However, Braeden was uneasy about the daytime soap opera genre, admitting years later he thought it was "too confining"; although soon signed a six-month contract. Bell immediately changed Victor's storyline to salvage, redeem and develop the character.

In January 1999, Braeden’s character appeared on The Bold and the Beautiful in a crossover event. Braeden’s appearances on the show were January 25 to January 28 of the same year. On January 27, 2026, it was announced Braeden would crossover to Beyond the Gates as Victor. This event is scheduled to air from June 9 to June 12 of the same year. Braeden made his first appearance during the June 5 episode.

== Development ==
=== Characterization ===
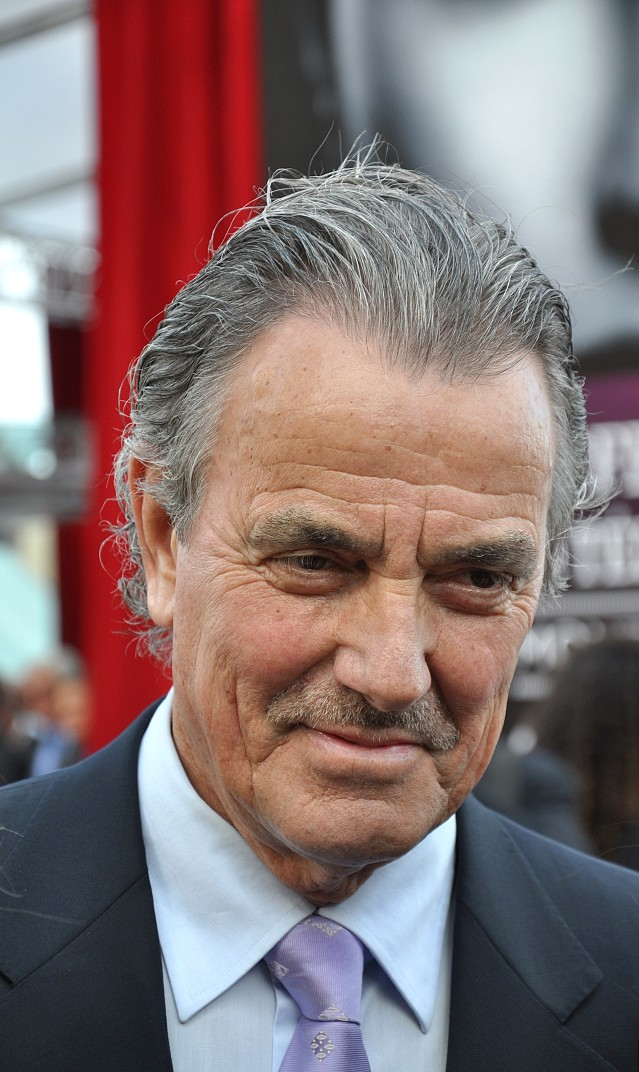
Eric Braeden stated that Victor always uses money to get what he wants.

William J. Bell created Victor as a "despicable, contemptible, unfaithful wife abuser". The soap opera's official website notes: "Victor is loving and protective toward family and loved ones, but if crossed, or if Victor feels that one is not living up to one's full potential; then he can more than live up to the adjective that many have used to describe him ruthless." The Los Angeles Times characterizes him as "charming but complicated", while others publications have described him as a villain, as well as an evil, powerful and ruthless character. Sara Bibel of Xfinity wrote that Victor is a male chauvinist. Although he is often considered malicious, Braeden stated that "Bill Bell was a very wise man" and that "he created someone in Victor who is a very lonely man yet also a man who can be affectionate and loving and forgiving". Shelly Fralic of the Winnipeg Free Press described Victor in 2009, stating:

The blackest of blackguards. If these are the adjectives that pad the resume of a first-class villain, then there has never been a better candidate for the job, at least of the fictional variety, than Victor Newman. As the revered scion and Machiavellian manipulator of the Newman dynasty on the daytime soap The Young and the Restless, Victor Newman, right down to the Snidely Whiplash moustache, is so bad that he's good; good at business if not relationships, good at skulduggery if not morality, good at keeping a daily story line addictively interesting for nearly three decades.

Fralic also described the character as being "quixotic", who is "deeply layered with arrogance and angst, imbued with all the failings and bravado that a true villain possesses, his dastardly deeds leaving him most recently responsible not only for the death of his own heart donor, but for the near-death of his granddaughter Summer from peanut poisoning". She also noted that he's been jailed, thrown in a psychiatric ward and shot, had amnesia, epilepsy among other events, but "like all villains worth their salt, he's survived it all and inspired respect, if not adoration". Braeden describes the character as "the villain" and as "defensive and always self-protective", stating that he's "not here to win a popularity contest". He stated that he enjoys portraying Victor "more than anything", also describing him as "very complex". Braeden said that "he fought himself to the position he arrived at a number of years ago", and that "he obviously doesn't suffer fools easily, doesn't suffer enemies easily. He wants relationships badly, but doesn't quite trust them. It's a tragic flaw in him because of his childhood." The actor, comparing himself to the character, noted that he is nothing like Victor, stating: "Money makes a lot of things happen for Victor. My God almighty, that's something else that I, Eric Braeden, would never do. I always confront things directly. But when that doesn't work for Victor, he gets out his wallet [...] If you are abusive to him, he will be abusive to you. No one gets away with that. I will not allow anyone to cross that line with the character."

In June 2011, Michael Logan of TV Guide felt that Victor was "pushing it with the fans", stating: "The megalomaniacal patriarch earned considerable viewer backlash last month when he threw his ex-wife [Diane] from the back of an ambulance and left her bruised and bloodied." In an interview with Logan, Braeden stated that Victor "doesn't give a shit" and "he doesn't take any shit", saying that is "the whole point of the character". The actor also stated he does not like women defeating Victor, admitting that he wasn't pleased in a 2003 scene where his daughter Victoria (portrayed by Heather Tom) slaps him.

When asked which storyline he felt affinity for or strongly about in his thirty years during an interview with AOL TV, Braeden stated it was the scenes in which he met his dying mother, Cora Miller (Dorothy McGuire), for the first time since he was seven years old. The actor credited it as the turning point of his career on the show, describing it as "a deeply-felt scene" and something he would never forget. He said:

Victor met his mother for the first time, because she had left him at the doors of an orphanage when he was 7 years old. The very first time I told that story to Nikki was at Christmastime, and she never knew about my background. I revealed to her my story, and something in that storyline just got to me [...] The scene was just full of anger and sadness, all at once. It touched me because, when you grow up during the war as I did, you never forget such massive destruction around you. Such tragedy. All of this horror is indelibly imprinted on your brain. What insanity that war was, and all because of a man with a huge superiority complex.

=== Relationships ===
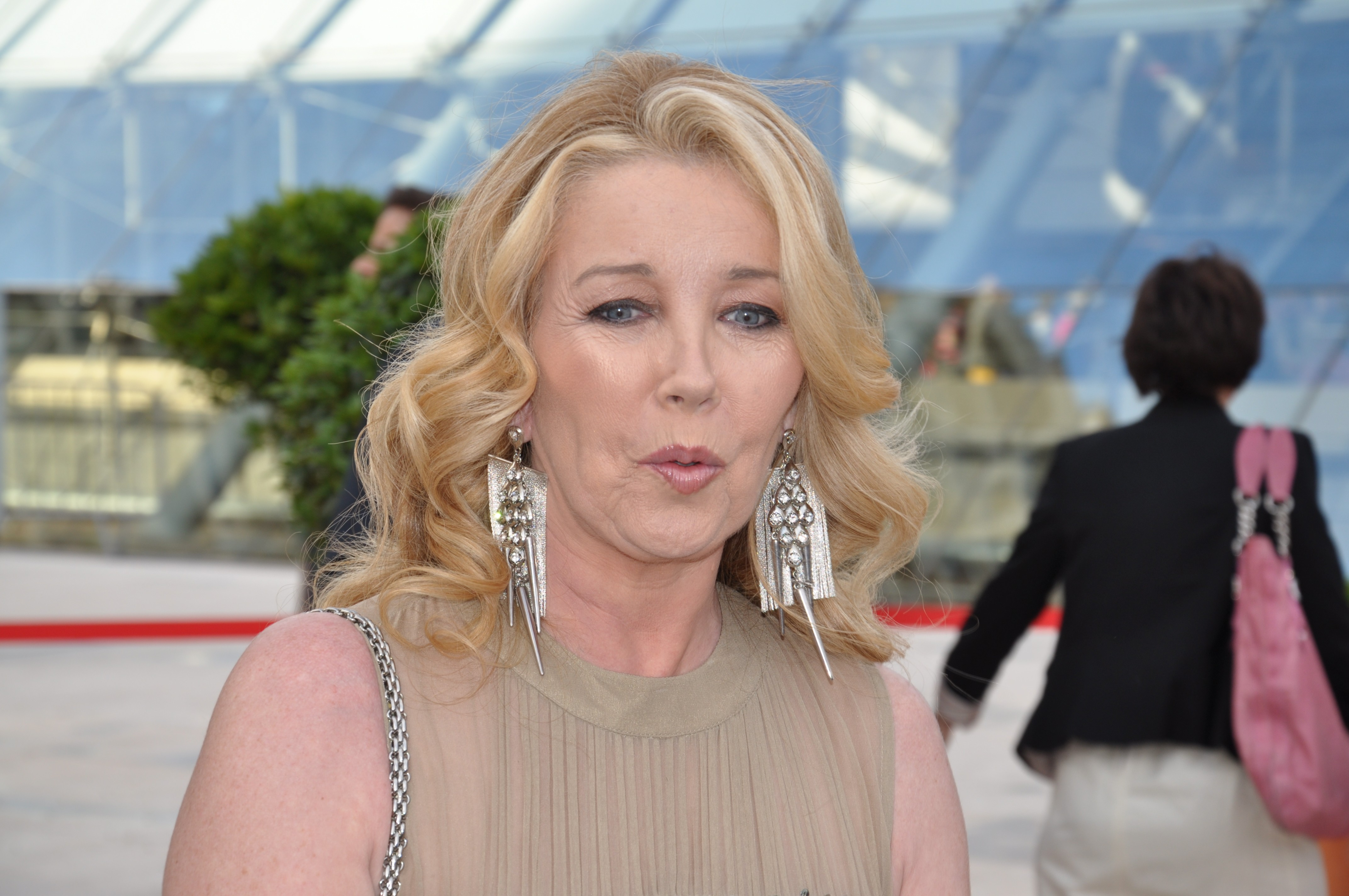
Melody Thomas Scott portrays Nikki, Victor's main love interest for over three decades. Their union has registered "an enduring appeal" among viewers.

For over three decades, Victor has been romantically linked with Nikki Reed (Melody Thomas Scott). Nikki was originally from the lower walks of life, having been a stripper. After multiple failed relationships, she began a romance with Victor, who taught her about society. They fall in love and have a child, Victoria Newman (Amelia Heinle), and later a son, Nicholas Newman (Joshua Morrow). The couple are widely considered a supercouple within the soap opera media. The writers of The Young and the Restless detailed their characters to marry and divorce or depart from each other in some form or fashion in a continuous cycle, which is a take on the original supercouple formula. Soap Opera Digest relayed the beginning of the pairing's creation and their impact, described as an "inspired decision", led to Victor and Nikki becoming the series' most successful supercouple. In an interview with Dose magazine, Scott said that the couple always has to get back together, but not without a challenge.

Victor and Nikki are recognized as one of daytime television's most prominent couples. They have also garnered a large fan following, dubbed "Niktor" by viewers. In addition, the couple's weddings have been reported by mainstream media. Scott has said: "Let's face facts: Victor and Nikki will always be a huge dynamic, they've been in a circular cycle for over 30 years! Finding a new leading man that you have chemistry with is like finding gold." In a 1994 interview with The Los Angeles Times, the newspaper reported that Victor's relationship with Nikki had "registered an enduring appeal among viewers", with Braeden replying that, "Arguably, it's the idea of this incredibly powerful, wealthy man taking a woman who comes from the wrong side of the tracks into his life, and shaping her and forming her more to his liking. But, of course, no one can shape or form anyone, she remains who she is, has retained her strength, and that causes conflict." In other interviews, Braeden stated that he loves working with Scott and that he "always thought it was an honestly felt love story with great material for conflict with Nikki". He also stated in an interview that he considers Victor's storylines with Nikki to be some of his favorites. Discussing Victor and Nikki's union, former As the World Turns actress Martha Byrne stated: "Young and Restless' Victor and Nikki are the perfect example of a couple who they can tear apart and put back together how many times? And [the writers] do it really well because they're so stable as characters that you can basically do anything with them now, and the audience will go on the journey with them." The Museum of Television and Radio wrote: "Combined with a series of social-issue storylines covering everything from AIDS to date rape to the plight of the elderly, as well as featuring a group of popular young African-American characters, and several long-term romantic and professional relationships, Victor and Nikki's love story has kept viewers enthralled for many years." They also described their relationship as being a "dominant force" in the soap opera. Daytime journalist Michael Fairman stated: "Victor and Nikki just can't, we mean can't, ever get it together long enough to find any happiness with each other. So, many would say that they deserve each other and the baggage and betrayals that come along with their co-dependent relationship."

Aside from Nikki, Victor is known for his relationship with Ashley Abbott (Eileen Davidson). While Ashley was at a low point in her life, he had an affair with her. This led to Ashley's pregnancy, and Victor left Nikki. However, Nikki was diagnosed with cancer and he returned to her, and Ashley aborted her baby; a move she regretted for many years. Ashley stole his sperm many years later, and had a child, Abby Carlton. Abby was believed to be Brad Carlton's (Don Diamont) daughter until she was five years old. Victor was married to Ashley from 1990 to 1993. In 2008, Victor married Sabrina Costelana (Raya Meddine), which was short-lived following her accidental death. Afterward, he left town and Ashley tracked him down when nobody else could. They reconnected their romantic relationship, later remarried and Ashley became pregnant. Davidson stated she was surprised by Ashley's pregnancy, but decided she liked the storyline as it was unexpected. Victor and Ashley's second marriage ended after she miscarried the child.

Victor was noted for his controversial relationship with both of his sons' ex-wife, Sharon Newman (Sharon Case), with whom he initially had a father-daughter relationship. In 2003, Victor and Sharon shared a kiss, causing issues in her marriage to Nicholas; she left town to "find herself". Victor supported Sharon throughout her legal problems, and paid her bail at first when she was wrongly convicted of murder in 2011. Case stated that she thinks Sharon thinks of Victor "in a way like a father figure, but not quite. When she was younger she saw him as that, and then when she grew up she saw him less as a father and more like a hero", also stating that Victor is Sharon's "security blanket". The dynamic of their relationship changed when Victor proposed a platonic marriage to Sharon in December 2011, and while they end up marrying, it is annulled shortly after. However, months after the annulment, they begin a genuine romance. Joshua Morrow, who portrays Nicholas, told Soaps in Depth that he was "always kind of surprised that Nick just accepted this from his dad", and that "there were never any scenes showing legitimate anger". Braeden didn't agree with the pairing either, stating that, "We all have gone through periods of playing something we didn't really like to play so much, but you do it."

Michael Fairman of On-Air On-Soaps said that the relationship "hasn't worked out or caught fire through the writing, or with the fans watching on-screen!" In August 2012, Victor and Sharon married a second time, and when he disappeared shortly after, she thought he was abandoning her. Sharon later burned their prenuptial agreement, and took over this company. Talking about the situation, Case stated that the writers could have done this storyline "a million other ways" without "marrying him [Victor]". In another interview, she characterized the relationship as incestuous: "Sometimes controversial storylines can work because you're bringing attention to a controversial issue that the nation is trying to decide on. But this was not one of those things. Everybody is universally against incest! It was just so upsetting to the audience. Whenever the actors went to do [personal appearances], the fans would bring it up. Literally, every actor in the building was coming up to me, giving me feedback that they were getting about it!" When asked if the marriage was about "daddy issues", Case said: "That's usually the case in a story like that, but I don't think it's one most people want to watch!" Victor later returned home and annulled their second marriage. During an interview with The Province, Michael Muhney, who portrays Victor's son Adam, said that Victor and Sharon's marriage was "almost like an inside joke".

=== Departure and return ===
In 2009, Braeden experienced multiple contract negotiation issues, leading to former executive producer and head writer Maria Arena Bell writing both Victor and Nikki (Melody Thomas Scott) out of the series. Their departures were reportedly due to sudden salary cuts in the middle of already negotiated contracts. During his onscreen absence, contract negotiations ensued with unknown predictions from the series. On the situation of the soap cutting his contract, Braeden stated during an interview: "When I sign a three-year deal, I'm obligated to fulfill that deal. The producers, however, can come to me after a half-year and say, 'We've changed our minds.' Where in the world of business does this kind of contract exist? Do I blame the people for wanting to squeeze as much out of us as they can? I do not. The question is, when do you squeeze too much?"

In another interview with Soap Opera Digest, the actor said of his departure: "It's not that one hadn't agreed to a reduction, but they hit you with a sledgehammer. It's done in such an insulting fashion. It could have been dealt with in a far more gracious way. It is cold and hard-nosed... The whole thing was so calculated it was unbelievable... It's not even about the money." Despite this, during contract negotiations, Braeden refused to say that he had departed fully, but did not know when a return would occur. However, within weeks, news broke that the actor and the series had managed a new contract. In a statement issued by CBS Daytime, they said: "We're very happy that Eric will be remaining with The Young and the Restless. Victor Newman has been an important part of the Genoa City canvas for nearly 30 years, and we know our audience will be tuning in to see what his plans are next." Onscreen, Braeden exited November 2, 2009, and made his return on January 15, 2010. That same year, the actor celebrated thirty years on the soap opera. In 2012, Braeden experienced further contract negotiations and speculation arose again that he would be leaving. Published reports said that Victor would be absent from the canvas for two weeks and that his contract expired that November. Two months later, it was announced that the actor had signed a new contract with The Young and the Restless, furthering his portrayal of Victor for an unspecified period of time. Braeden stated that he was "very glad we got the negotiations successfully behind us".

== Storylines ==
=== Backstory ===
Victor Newman was born Christian Miller on March 7, 1947, in Buffalo, New York. He was put in an orphanage by his mother, Cora Miller (McGuire), when he was seven years old. His father was Albert Miller. By the time he was a teenager, he left the orphanage and started to work his way through to becoming one of the world's wealthiest tycoons. He changed his name to "Victor Christian Newman," Victor standing for "victorious" and Newman standing for "new man," as he was a completely new man. In 1970, Victor married Julia Newman (Meg Bennet) as he began to develop a strong business reputation.

=== 1980–present ===
In 1980, Victor and his wife Julia move to Genoa City to help Katherine Chancellor (Jeanne Cooper) run her company, Chancellor Industries. Julia felt neglected by Victor and sleeps with her photographer, a man named Michael Scott (Nick Benedict). Victor created his own company, Newman Enterprises, and ended up cheating on Julia as well, with Eve Howard (Margaret Mason) and later Lorie Brooks (Jaime Lyn Bauer). Julia became pregnant and it is assumed that it was Michael's child; Victor attacks him and Julia loses the child, revealed to actually have been Victor's. Eve later has a child, Cole Howard (J. Eddie Peck), believed to be Victor's son. Julia and Victor divorce and she leaves town with Michael, just as Victor begins a romance with stripper Nikki Reed (Melody Thomas Scott). Having been from the lower walks of life, Victor teaches Nikki about society. He later takes over the Prentiss family company, Prentiss Industries, and they scheme to get it back by using Lorie to seduce Victor into a marriage. On their wedding day, Victor signs the company back over to them and Lorie stands him up. Victor then tries to return to Nikki, who recently married Kevin Bancroft. Nikki ended up pregnant with Victor's child, but she ended up being manipulated into a marriage to Tony DiSalvo to save her relationship with Kevin. Nikki later gives birth to a daughter named Victoria Newman (Ashley Nicole Millan). Nikki also later got involved with a man named Rick Daros, who nearly killed her before being saved by Victor. Eve Howard returns with her boyfriend, demanding that money be allocated to Cole in Victor's will, and later takes a job as his assistant, which prompts Julia to return to protect Victor. He planned to marry Eve but faked his death on the day of their wedding, and ends up marrying Nikki in April 1984. The following year, while Victor and Nikki are vacationing, Eve reappears with Rick, and they end up stealing money from them and escaping. Nikki facilitates Victor's reunion with his mother, Cora Miller, before her death.

Despite loving Nikki, Victor begins to fall for Ashley Abbott (Brenda Epperson) and they have an affair, enraging Nikki to sleep with Jack Abbott (Peter Bergman), Ashley's brother and Victor's business rival. Ashley becomes pregnant and Victor leaves Nikki, but when Nikki is diagnosed with cancer, Victor returns to her and Ashley aborts the child. When Nikki goes into remission, Victor wanted to be with Ashley, who had moved on with her psychiatrist Steven Lassiter (Rod Arrants); Steven later dies, and while Ashley wanted Victor back, he had returned to Nikki in an attempt to salvage their marriage, resulting in the birth of their son Nicholas Newman (Joshua Morrow). Victor and Jack later hire Leanna Love (Barbara Crampton) to write a biography on Victor, when in reality, Jack wanted the book to be a tell-all exposé on Victor. Leanna later writes a chapter about Victor's affair with Ashley and Nikki's illness, causing Victor to believe Nikki was behind the publication. He divorces her and marries Leanna to prove to the press that he didn't want to be with Ashley; their marriage was invalid, as the divorce wasn't finalized. Victor later takes over Jack's family company, Jabot Cosmetics, replacing him with Brad Carlton (Don Diamont). As a result, Jack spitefully marries Nikki, causing her relationship with Victor to become bitter. Victor marries Ashley, and years later; he tells Jack that he will give him back Jabot Cosmetics if he divorces Nikki. He agrees to do so, but Jack wasn't given full control of the company due to a legal loophole. Victor has a heart attack during a confrontation with Jack, and while he leaves him for dead, Victor recovers. As Jack and Nikki's marriage strained to due her alcoholism and pain killer addiction, she reconnected with Victor, who had decided to divorce Ashley

Eve later returned to town again with her now-grown son Cole, who romanced Victor's daughter Victoria, unaware he was believed to be Victor's son. Victor later left Genoa City and traveled to Kansas, letting Nikki and the rest of the Newman family believe he had died. He meets Hope Adams (Signy Coleman). They returned to Genoa City and married. While Victor was in Kansas, Cole and Victoria had eloped, and when Victor revealed their sibling relation, the marriage was annulled. However, when Eve died, it was revealed that Cole was never Victor's son; Victoria and Cole remarry. Victor and Hope later have a son, Victor Adam Newman Jr. Hope wanted to return to Kansas and Victor was not interested; he divorced her and Victor Jr. was raised without knowing Victor was his father. Nikki had been engaged to Brad, much to Victor's dismay. On their wedding night, Victor was shot and Nikki returned to him; the mentally unstable Mari Jo Mason (Diana Barton) was revealed as the gunwoman. Victor and Nikki briefly reunite before he returns to Kansas after Hope's new husband, Cliff Wilson, had died. In 1997, Victor marries Diane Jenkins (Alex Donnelley), Jack's ex-girlfriend. Nikki had Victor have a vasectomy, but had frozen sperm for a future possibility. Nikki later marries Joshua Landers (Heath Kizzier), and in 1998, she is shot by Joshua's ex-wife, Veronica Landers (Candice Daly); Victor divorces Diane to marry Nikki on her deathbed, promising to remarry Diane after Nikki's death. When Nikki survived, their second marriage was invalidated, as Victor and Diane's divorce was never processed. Victor and Diane begin a bitter divorce over many months, during which Nikki reunites with Brad, and he and Jack take control of Newman Enterprises.

Diane remained in love with Victor, and stole his frozen sperm to artificially inseminate herself. Unbeknownst to her, Ashley had also stolen Victor's sperm to inseminate herself. Diane gave birth to Christian Victor Newman, but was shocked to discover the sperm she'd stolen was that of Jack. Ashley had received Victor's actual sperm sample and gives birth to Abby Carlton, whom she decides to pass off as Brad's child. Victor and Nikki later reunite, and in 2002, Maxwell Hollister (Sam Behrens) attempts to destroy Victor, using his estranged wife, revealed to be Lorie Brooks, in his plot. Originally, Max attempted to lead a hostile takeover of Julia Newman Martin's design firm, which Victor prevented. Now, Max used Lorie to keep Victor and Nikki apart, but Lorie could not follow through, and a ruined Max ends up leaving town. Months after, Victor and Nikki remarry in front of all of their loved ones. Ashley reveals that Abby is in fact Victor's daughter as she was diagnosed with cancer, and he welcomes her with open arms. After rescuing Nikki from a carjacker, Victor is diagnosed with temporal lobe epilepsy. Victor and Nikki's marriage slowly strained as he was caught up in taking Jabot Cosmetics away from Jack, dealing with NVP Retreats, and Nikki's campaign for State Senator, which resulted in an affair with her campaign manager David Chow. Victor and Nikki eventually divorce after six years in 2008. Soon after, Hope dies and Victor's estranged son, now known as Adam Newman (Michael Muhney), comes to Genoa City and works at Newman Enterprises.

Victor later falls in love with Sabrina Costelana (Raya Meddine), but she dies in a car accident with Nikki's devious husband, David Chow. Victor travels to Mexico and nearly dies, and Ashley is able to find him; they end up rekindling their romance. They remarried when Ashley became pregnant, but she miscarries when Adam gaslights her into having a hysterical pregnancy, but convinced her that she was still pregnant. Despite Adam stealing Nicholas' daughter, Faith, and passing her off as Ashley's, she and Victor divorce as he reunites with Nikki again. Victor was later shot by Patty Williams (Stacy Haiduk) and needed a heart transplant, receiving Colleen Carlton's (Tammin Sursok) heart. Victor and Nikki left for treatment in Europe, and upon their return, Adam's scheme was revealed and he faked his death. Victor went searching for him in Canada and met Meggie McClaine (Sean Young); he brings her to Genoa City and she works as Nikki's assistant, but causes her to relapse into alcoholism. In reality, Meggie was trying to foil Victor and Nikki's union to marry him for his money. Victor marries her, but has her arrested soon after; Nikki moves on with Deacon Sharpe (Sean Kanan). Afterward, Victor's children file a lawsuit against him over a cosmetics line, which they win.

Diane (Maura West), who had returned to Genoa City, reconnects with Victor and they remarry, however, it is annulled shortly after she finds him sleeping with Nikki and Victor learns of her affair with Tucker McCall (Stephen Nichols) and Jack. Afterward, Victor sends Nikki to a rehabilitation center for her alcoholism. Diane is murdered in August 2011, with Victor as a suspect. Nikki in fact murdered Diane in self-defense, causing Victor to falsely confess to murdering her to protect Nikki. While in jail, Victor marries his former daughter-in-law, Sharon Newman (Sharon Case), to push Nikki away, however when the entire murder plot is revealed, Nikki is not charged and Victor is freed. Victor and Sharon's marriage is annulled and he reunites with Nikki, however, she leaves him when some of his past schemes involving Victoria's marriage are exposed. To gain control of the cosmetics line Beauty of Nature, Victor slept with Genevieve Atkinson (Genie Francis). When Nikki reunites with Jack, Victor develops a genuine romance with Sharon to spite her. They marry a second time, however he disappears from town shortly after and Sharon believed he was abandoning her. She burned their prenuptial agreement and took over Newman Enterprises, while Jack and Tucker were buying up its stocks. While away, Victor had lost his memory and was working as a dock worker in Los Angeles; he was demanding better working conditions and the other workers planned to have him killed in an explosion, as a result, Genoa City believed Victor had died, but he returned shortly after. Upon his return, he annuls his marriage to Sharon and reunites with Nikki, just before Jack announces he is taking over Newman Enterprises, firing all of the Newman family and instating Adam. However, due to his addiction to pain killers, Jack gave up control of the company, leaving it to Adam.

Victor and Nikki finally remarry in March 2013 just before she is diagnosed with multiple sclerosis. At their wedding, an assassin attempts to shoot Victor, but Adam takes the bullet and nearly dies for his father. As a result, he offers Victor the position of co-CEO at Newman, and they begin working together. However, their partnership ends several months later when Victor discovers that Adam's silent partner used to take Newman private again was Jack. Victor fears that Adam and Jack have been scheming to take back the company for themselves without Victor. In retaliating, Victor, who now owns Chancellor Industries according to Katherine Chancellor's will, has all major Newman clients sign to Chancellor, as Victor leaves Newman worthless so he could build up Chancellor. Adam signs over his shares in Newman over to Victor, who plans to merge Chancellor Industries with Newman. Nikki then reveals she gave birth to another son decades earlier before she was with Victor, revealed to be Dylan McAvoy (Steve Burton). A subsidiary of the newly merged conglomerate, named Bonaventure Industries, later produced an illegal speed drug that Summer Newman (Hunter King) ended up overdosing on. Jack reported Victor to the FDA and he and his company were put under investigation. Dylan's supposed father and Nikki's former lover Ian Ward (Ray Wise) then arrives in town and causes pandemonium, to which Victor tries to get him out of town. It was later revealed that Victor had hired a lookalike to his granddaughter Cassie, named Mariah Copeland (Camryn Grimes), to haunt Sharon and learn a supposed secret she has. When his scheme is revealed, Nick and Sharon shun him and Nikki decides to move out for a while, but she and Victor later reunite. Victor and Nikki later learn that Ian is incapable of fathering children, leading to confusion. It is later revealed that Paul Williams (Doug Davidson), Nikki's ex-lover and longtime friend, is in fact Dylan's father, causing tension in Victor and Nikki's marriage, which continues when Victor goes to extensive lengths to awaken Phyllis (Gina Tognoni) from a coma to find out more information on Sharon's supposed secret. Nikki falls off the wagon and begins drinking again; she leaves Victor and refuses to take him back. Victor also sells Chancellor Industries back to Jill (Jess Walton), leaving the rest of the Newman family confused as to why he gave Chancellor up so easily.

In 2015, Victor has Jack kidnapped and replaced by a lookalike, who turns out to be a Peruvian drug lord named Marco Annicelli, all for him to take over Jabot Cosmetics and merge it with Newman, becoming Newman Abbott Enterprises. Meanwhile, Victor and his children discover that Nikki has fallen off the wagon; they convince her to quit drinking again and she and Victor end up reuniting. Jack makes his way back to Genoa City just as Victor learns that Marco is dangerous; he plans on shooting Marco dead in the park, but it is actually Jack who he ends up shooting, who had finally returned to confront him. Jack ends up falling comatose while Victor frantically tries to get rid of Marco, who continues to masquerade around town. When Jack awakens, he reluctantly agrees to help Victor get Marco out of town and back in prison, which they end up doing successfully. With the real Jack back in Genoa City, the Newman Abbott merger comes to an end and both companies return to their separate states. Meanwhile, Adam, who had returned to town under the false identity of Gabriel Bingham, had teamed up with Ian (who had escaped prison) to create a computer virus to destroy Newman Enterprises for separate revenge on both their parts; the virus was known as the Paragon project, which later led to the revelation that "Gabriel" is in fact Adam. He agrees to stop Paragon, but Ian makes no such promise; on Halloween, when a party was being thrown in the Newman Enterprises ballroom, Ian is responsible for the building catching fire and a great panic ensuing. As a result, Ashley and Billy (Burgess Jenkins) offer to share office space at Jabot with Newman while the Newman building is being repaired, but Victor refuses to trust them. It is later revealed that Billy revived Paragon as an act of revenge against Victor, leading to Jack firing him and Victor filing a lawsuit against Jabot.

== Reception and legacy ==
"Newman has become a daytime television icon during his unparalleled tenure as soap opera's biggest star ... Victor Newman quickly developed into a main character and firmly planted himself into the hearts of millions of fans across the globe."

— Good News Weekly on Victor Newman (2010)

Chris Jancelewicz of The Huffington Post described Victor as "the very definition of daytime TV icon" and noted that, "Even people who have never seen an episode in their lives know his name, his face, and his powerful low voice." In the early 1990s, he was described as a heartthrob. He is credited as being one of the soap opera world's leading stars. Jamey Giddens of Zap2it considers Braeden the soap opera's leading male. Tommy Garrett of Highlight Hollywood stated that Braeden "is known in the industry as the biggest daytime leading man of all time". In 1993, Nancy Reichardt of The Los Angeles Times stated: "Victor Newman is one of those characters. When Eric Braeden first came on the show in the role, Victor was a villain, and what a villain! His portrayal proved so dynamic that this "minor" plot point has been ignored over the years. Today, Braeden is one of the show's leading men. The character has never lost his edge, but his knife-wielding days are long forgotten."

In 1997, The Museum of Television and Radio wrote that with the arrival of the character, who was an "enigmatic stranger popular with women", "the show's revived tableau was complete", saying it was an "amazingly seamless transition" and praised William J. Bell for the character's introduction. Deanna Barnert of MSN Entertainment wrote of Braeden's tenure: "Eric Braeden first signed onto The Young and the Restless in 1980 for a mini-stint as a baddy, but stayed on to change the game in Genoa City forever, becoming one of daytime's most recognizable forces on and off screen." In 2010, Global News wrote that, "From the early days of The Young and the Restless, Victor Newman has been a symbol of power in Genoa City."

Braeden's biography at Yahoo! notes that upon his casting as the ruthless businessman Victor, he "clicked with both the audience and the creative powers, and has been one of the series leading men for close to two decades". Kim Muraro of LimeLife stated that instead of his originally planned three-month stay at the series, he "has become one of the most iconic characters in daytime TV". Garrett, writing from Canyon News, wrote: "[Braeden] plays the mastermind mogul with real gusto. His innate acting skills are as legendary as his distinguished career. This week, we saw Braeden play ruthless, conniving and ultimately a loving father." Good News Weekly wrote: "There are some men that are larger than life. There are some men that transcend the TV screen. There are some men that touch the lives of millions of viewers. Victor Newman is one of those men." In 2005, Lynette Rice of Entertainment Weekly wrote that Braeden has transformed the character into a "global phenom". BuddyTV noted the storyline where Victor locked his wife Julia's lover in a bomb shelter as "the turning point" in the character's life, making him a villain.

The character of Victor has been used as a spokesperson for the Canadian discount store Zellers and appeared in an advert for it. The commercials aired in November 1998. In the adverts, Victor breaks the proverbial fourth wall, and begins speaking to the Zellers shopper on the other side of the television screen, praising her admirable combination of style and thrift. He steps closer and squashes his nose against the camera lens. According to the website StrategyOnline, the promotional ad campaign for Zellers featuring Victor proved to be the most popular installment to date as of May 1999; the staff of StrategyOnline wrote that the campaign "has garnered considerable praise in the marketing community – and small wonder. Not only does it perform the considerable task of balancing an affordability message with strong branding, it does so in a category seldom noted for the quality of strategic thinking that goes into its advertising."

Victor's pairing with Nikki has received positive reviews from critics throughout the years; The News & Advance cited Victor and Nikki with other romances considered "epic" of the early supercouple era. Global News wrote of their long-standing relationship, "Victor is the consummate womanizer and has been a part of many relationships over the years. Nonetheless, his heart belongs to one woman alone, the stunning Nikki Reed. Despite true love and good intention, the relationship between Victor and Nikki has always been troubled by poor timing and miscommunication." In 1990, The Washington Times wrote that, "Victor Newman's sudden marriage to Ashley Abbott fooled us all." In 1995, Sports Illustrated wrote of Victor's marriage to Hope, saying a "man with that much power could have married anyone, but he fell in love with a blind woman. Not for what she is, but who she's about." In 2002, Entertainment Weekly wrote that the soap opera was "keeping it real" with Victor and Nikki's third wedding. Upon their fourth wedding in 2013, the magazine stated: "Say what you will about Victor (and we've all said a lot), but the ol' boy definitely knows who is best for him — Nikki."

On Victor's rivalry with Jack Abbott (Peter Bergman), Allison Waldman of AOL TV said: "After all, their characters' on screen feud has been the stuff of soap legend. Victor and Jack have shared wives, corporations, but mostly, unabashed hatred. They despise each other." Additionally, Waldman wrote: "Braeden's contribution to the show these past three decades really cannot be understated. He's been a driving force as Victor primarily because he's a villain who's not quite pure evil. He has a heart and on occasion shows a vulnerability that makes him likable and even sympathetic" but "like a big jungle cat, he is not one to be tamed. That's why at any point, Victor can turn on someone he once professed to love [...] See, that's Victor. He makes viewers crazy with his actions, but he's so dynamic and interesting, that you can't stop watching him. Thank you, Eric Braeden. You are Victor and you have made him completely compelling for 30 years." In another article, Waldman called Braeden one of the biggest stars in the soap opera business. Victor has adopted several nicknames on the show that have carried into the media. This includes "The Mustache" and "The Dark Night".

When asked during the same interview why he believed Victor had so much commercial appeal, Braeden responded: "I really don't know. I've always been a very emotional actor, in other words, the only criterion I go by when I film scenes is to make them as believable and real as possible. Maybe it's that. Maybe – and I'm not sure if there's any truth to this – but people can perhaps sense that I've seen a lot in my life. I've been through a lot, and maybe for that reason I can feel empathy."

Tommy Garrett of Highlight Hollywood also compared his performance to his portrayal of John Jacob Astor IV in the 1997 film Titanic, stating that the performances are "equally enthralling". A writer from The Age describes Victor's voice as "gravel". Toby Goldstein of The Orlando Sentinel stated that Victor is one of the characters contributing to the soap opera's longtime popularity. Shelley Fralic of the Winnipeg Free Press named Braeden along with Susan Lucci (who portrayed Erica Kane on All My Children) to be the soap opera genre's biggest icons. Fralic stated that he is the "eye of the Genoa City hurricane" and that "the thought of Y&R without Victor Newman – his character is recovering from a heart transplant and was going to "disappear" to Belgium for rehabilitation – is hard to imagine, rather like Dallas without J.R. Ewing, or The Sopranos without Tony."

In 2022, Charlie Mason from Soaps She Knows placed Victor second on his list of the best 25 characters from The Young and the Restless, commenting "You know you've reached the status of icon when your mustache has a space reserved for it at the Smithsonian. Then again, you also have a pretty good hunch that you're the stuff of legend when, as Eric Braeden's womanizing character has (well, should have), you have a former-wives wing at the American Museum of Natural History that rivals Henry VIII's."

== See also ==
- Victor and Nikki Newman
- List of soap opera villains
