= Sharon Case =

American actress and former model (born 1971)

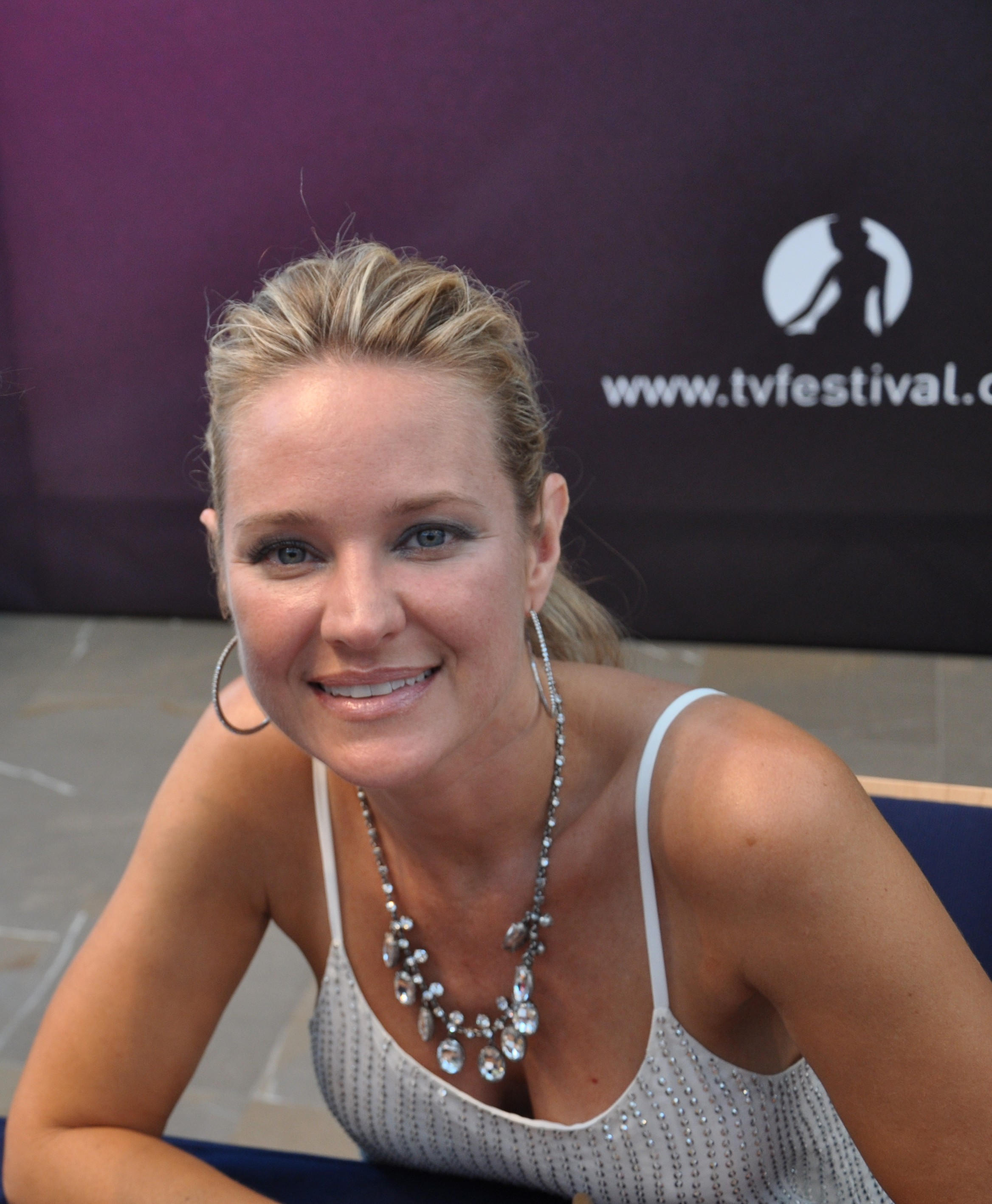
- Case at the 2013 Monte-Carlo Television Festival
- Born: February 9, 1971 (age 55); Detroit, Michigan, U.S.
- Occupations: Actress, jewelry designer, model
- Years active: 1989–present
- Spouse: Sandy Corzine (2007–09)

Sharon Case (born February 9, 1971) is an American actress and former model. At the age of 17, Case began working as a model, relocating briefly to Japan, before pursuing an acting career. She is best known for her roles on daytime television soap operas, scoring parts in the serials General Hospital and As the World Turns during the early stages of her career. In 1994, she stepped into the role of Sharon Newman on the CBS daytime soap opera The Young and the Restless, which she still plays. Case, who is considered a leading actress in the series, won the 1999 Daytime Emmy Award for Outstanding Supporting Actress in a Drama Series for her performance.

== Personal life ==
Case was born on February 9, 1971, in Detroit, Michigan. During her childhood, she was involved heavily in dancing, devoting herself to ballet and jazz. When she was three, Case relocated to Chatsworth, California.

She was married to businessman Sandy Corzine from April 2007 to November 2009, with the marriage ending in divorce.

In December 2001, Case became the first soap opera actress to be featured on the cover of FHM, a men's lifestyle magazine. This issue featured multiple other daytime television actresses. Case is active on social networking website Twitter. As of May 2019, Case was in a relationship with her The Young and the Restless co-star, Mark Grossman, who plays Adam Newman, one of the character's love interests on the soap.

== Career ==
=== Beginnings ===
Although Case's main goal was to become an actress, she turned her attention to modeling as a teenager. She stated: "I thought modeling would be a good start in the business". At the age of 17 in 1988, Case caught the eye of a scout while attending a modeling event, and was offered a modeling job in Japan. She traveled to Japan for five months, before returning to Los Angeles. She later took part in theater, garnering lead role credits in the musicals Grease, The Wizard and The Nutcracker.

=== Television and film ===
In November 1989, Case scored her first television role playing Dawn Winthrop on the ABC Network soap opera General Hospital. Case wanted to "perfect" her audition prior to screen testing as Dawn, who served as the long-lost daughter of the long-running character Monica Quartermaine (Leslie Charleson). Speaking of the audition, Case stated: "I practiced night and day [...] It was a heavy scene in which Dawn learned that her boyfriend Ned (Kurt Robin McKinney) had once slept with her mother! I knew I had to do the best job [possible]". She departed General Hospital the next year, after a guest appearance on another ABC series, the comedy drama Doogie Howser, M.D.. In 1991, Case appeared in various other television series, including Diplomatic Immunity, Beverly Hills, 90210, Parker Lewis Can't Lose and Cheers. From November 1992 to 1993 Case stepped into her second soap opera role, as Debbie Simon on the CBS Network drama As the World Turns. Case has stated that she loved the role, and wanted to stay on to explore more into the character of Debbie who was a "manic depressive", an issue that hadn't been covered on daytime television. During this, she also appeared on the CBS crime drama Silk Stalkings as Bonnie Abagail. In 1994, a year after departing from As the World Turns, she became a regular on the primetime soap opera Valley of the Dolls, which was based on the romantic novel of the same name. In 1997, Case had a role in the HBO film Breast Men. Previously, she turned down a larger role in the film due to being uncomfortable topless on-screen. Instead, she accepted a smaller, clothed role.

In 2005, Case appeared in an independent film entitled Carpool Guy with The Young and the Restless co-star Lauralee Bell. Also that year, she starred in the short film Wentworth. The film was about a man named Wentworth who had to choose between the women of his dream, Emily, and the "perfect" woman in his dreams, "Dream" Emily, both played by Case. It was directed by Steve Suettinger, and produced independently by students at the University of Southern California.

In 2007, Case starred with Debra Hopkins in her second short film, Repressions, which ran for 24 minutes. Produced by Roundhay Garden films and directed by Adam Kargman, it was filmed from May 14 to July 16, 2006. In the film, Janie (Case) is being tricked by her therapist into believing she has repressed memories of sexual child abuse. The film was met with critical acclaim from independent movie reviewers who found her performance "mesmerizing" and "stunning". Oscar Award nominee Jesse Friedman heavily praised the film, and encouraged people to watch it. In 2009, Case appeared on an episode of the sex comedy web series Poor Paul which was created by former The Young and the Restless co-star Kevin Schmidt. In June 2010, Case starred opposite David James Elliott in the romantic comedy Dad's Home for the Hallmark Channel.

=== The Young and the Restless ===
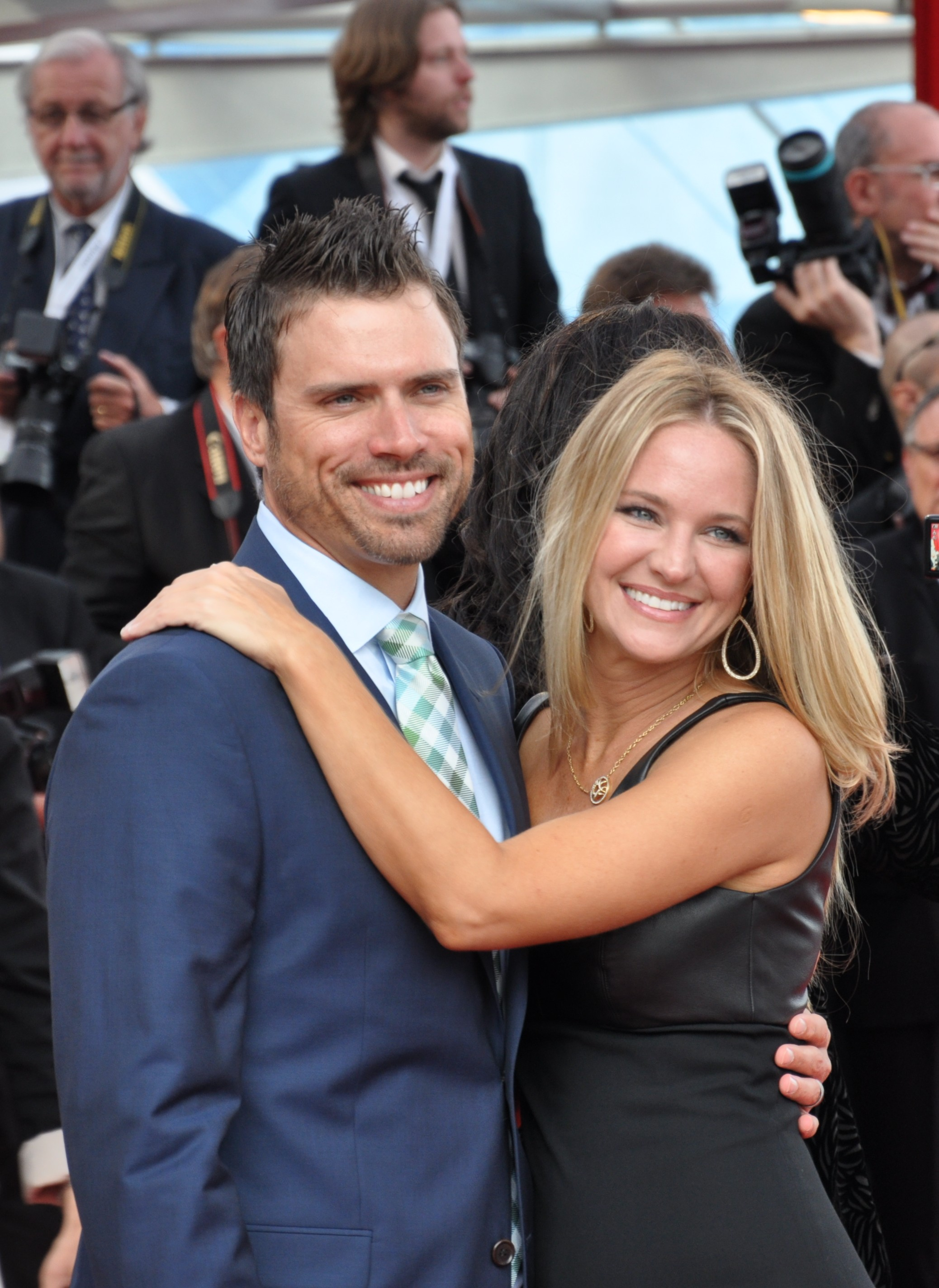
Case with co-star Joshua Morrow in 2013.

In August 1994, Case was cast in the role of Sharon Newman on the CBS soap opera The Young and the Restless. The character had been introduced by the show's creator William J. Bell earlier that year, on March 24, 1994. The role was previously played by Monica Potter and Heidi Mark for two months each. Of her casting, Case stated: "Not only is this my third soap, but I'm also the third actress to play the role of Sharon Collins. So, if three times is the charm, this should be it." The actress wanted to "breathe new life" into the role and make it her own. Case was upgraded from a recurring status to a contract in early 1995. In 2001, Case revealed that she had only expected to remain on the show for six months. February 2003 saw her temporarily leave the show due to contract negotiations, with Case eventually returning that April. The character who grew up on the "wrong side of the tracks" has developed into a mother and business woman; known for her supercouple romantic pairing with Nicholas Newman (Joshua Morrow) and a "darker" relationship with Adam Newman (Michael Muhney).

Since 2011, the character's storylines have been met with controversy and negative feedback. Case herself has stated that she has been unhappy with the character being paired with "too many men" because it "waters" the storyline down. A storyline in which she let her children believe she was dead was heavily frowned upon by Yahoo!. The show's cast and viewers were appalled when Sharon was romantically paired with her former father-in-law who she had grown to have a father-daughter relationship with, Victor Newman (Eric Braeden). The storyline was considered an "inside joke" by cast members. Case was unhappy with the romance she considered almost "incestuous", stating: "Sometimes controversial storylines can work because you're bringing attention to a controversial issue that the nation is trying to decide on. But this was not one of those things. Everybody is universally against incest! It was just so upsetting to the audience."

The show's former head writer and executive producer Maria Arena Bell has been highly criticized for the "destruction" of Sharon. Jillian Bowe, a writer of the website Zap2It said that the character was "beloved" but Bell had "assassinated" her "via one ill-conceived storyline and/or romance after another." Tommy Garrett of Canyon News praised Case, and wrote that: "Maria Bell knows that consummate actress Sharon Case plays the consummate heroine Sharon Newman with aplomb." Garret also has described Case's performance as "flawless" playing a "role of a lifetime and giving the performance of a lifetime." Case has received several awards for her work on The Young and the Restless. Canyon News suggested that her performance needed more Emmy attention. The character has tackled issues such as infidelity and rape, and in recent years, mental health social issues like kleptomania and most notably bipolar disorder. Case continues to play Sharon today.

== Jewelry line ==
In January 2010, Case announced that she had created a signature line of fashion jewelry entitled "Pomp". She created it with her best friend and fashion stylist Elif Inanc. The line was designed to have a "piece for everybody" which could be worn on any occasion. 20 different designs of jewelry pieces were featured in the line's initial reveal through the shopping cable QVC Network in August 2010; prices ranged from $20–40. Nine more additional pieces were added to the "Pomp" jewelry line on January 15, 2011. Kim Daugherty of Yahoo! noted that "they are touted to be ideal for a night on the town, giving 'The Young and the Restless' fans an affordable way to sparkle and shine with star-quality by wearing star-designed jewelry". Case described the line as being affordable "chic, fun and hip".

== Filmography ==
=== Television ===
Year	Title	Role	Notes	Ref.
1989–90	General Hospital	Dawn Winthrop	Recurring role	
1990	Doogie Howser, M.D.	Blonde girl	Episode: "Ask Dr. Doogie"	
1991	Diplomatic Immunity	Ellen Hickel		
1991	Beverly Hills, 90210	Darla Dillon	Episode: "April Is The Cruelest Month"; Episode: "Spring Dance"	
1991	Parker Lewis Can't Lose	Donna Sue Horton; Joanne	Episode: "Future Shock"; Episode: "My Fair Shelly"	
1991	Cheers	Bride	Episode: "Go Make"	
1992	Silk Stalkings	Bonnie Abagail West	Episode: "Working Girl"	
1992–93	As the World Turns	Debbie Simon	Recurring role	
1994–present	The Young and the Restless	Sharon Newman	Regular role	
1994	Valley of the Dolls	Anne Welles	Regular role; 65 episodes	
2009	Poor Paul	Lisa	Web series	
2014	Hell's Kitchen	Herself	Season 12 Episode 4: "17 Chefs Compete"	

=== Film ===
Year	Title	Role	Notes	Ref.
1997	Breast Men	Circulating Nurse	HBO television film	
2005	Wentworth	Emily; Dream Emily	Short film	
2005	Carpool Guy	Vanessa		
2007	Repressions	Janie	Short film	
2010	Dad's Home	Hope	Hallmark television film	

== Awards and nominations ==
List of acting awards and nominations
Year	Award	Category	Title	Result	Ref.
1996	Daytime Emmy Award	Outstanding Younger Actress in a Drama Series	The Young and the Restless	Nominated	
1997	Daytime Emmy Award	Outstanding Younger Actress in a Drama Series	The Young and the Restless	Nominated	
1997	Soap Opera Digest Award	Hottest Romance (shared with Joshua Morrow)	The Young and the Restless	Nominated	
1998	Soap Opera Digest Award	Hottest Female Star	The Young and the Restless	Won	
1999	Daytime Emmy Award	Outstanding Supporting Actress in a Drama Series	The Young and the Restless	Won	
2000	Daytime Emmy Award	Outstanding Supporting Actress in a Drama Series	The Young and the Restless	Nominated	
2003	TV Soap Golden Boomerang Award	Younger Female Star	The Young and the Restless	Won	
2003	Soap Opera Digest Award	Outstanding Supporting Actress	The Young and the Restless	Nominated	
2004	Daytime Emmy Award	Outstanding Supporting Actress in a Drama Series	The Young and the Restless	Nominated	
2008	Method Fest Award	Best Actress (Short Film)	Repressions	Nominated	
2016	Soap Awards France	Best Actress of the Year	The Young and the Restless	Nominated	
2017	Soap Awards France	Best Actress of the Year	The Young and the Restless	Nominated	
2018	Soap Awards France	Best Couple of the Year — "Sharon and Nick" (shared with Joshua Morrow)	The Young and the Restless	Nominated	
2018	Soap Awards France	Best Actress of the Year	The Young and the Restless	Won	
2019	Soap Awards France	Best International Actor / Actress	The Young and the Restless	Won	
2020	Soap Hub Awards	Favorite The Young and the Restless Actress	The Young and the Restless	Won	
2021	Soap Awards France	Best International Actress	The Young and the Restless	Won	
2023	Daytime Emmy Award	Outstanding Lead Actress in a Drama Series	The Young and the Restless	Nominated	
2025	Daytime Emmy Award	Outstanding Lead Actress in a Drama Series	The Young and the Restless	Nominated	
