= Hope Wilson =

Fictional character from the American CBS soap opera The Young and the Restless

- The Young and the Restless character
- Portrayed by: Signy Coleman (1993–1997,2002, 2008,2012); Beth Toussaint (2006); Maggie Gwin (2020)
- Duration: 1993–1997; 2000; 2002; 2006; 2008; 2010; 2012; 2020
- First appearance: May 1993
- Last appearance: August 26, 2020
- Introduced by: William J. Bell
In-universe information
- Other names: Hope Adams; Hope Newman; Hope Adams Newman
- Husband: Victor Newman (1994–1995); Cliff Wilson (1996)
- Sons: Adam Newman
- Grandsons: Connor Newman; Christian Newman

Hope Wilson is a fictional character from the CBS soap opera The Young and the Restless, portrayed by Signy Coleman. The character was introduced as a love interest for Victor Newman (Eric Braeden) in 1993. After her departure in 1997, Coleman reprised the role in 2000 and 2002. The role was then briefly portrayed by Beth Toussaint in 2006. In 2008, the character died onscreen, though Coleman continued to reprise the role as a vision had by other characters in 2010 and 2012. In 2020, Maggie Gwin briefly played the role of a younger Hope.

== Development ==
Despite Hope's heroic values, her son Adam is considered a monster. During an interview with TV Guide, Coleman talked about what Adam would be like if his mother was alive: "I understand the importance of creating conflict, but that was very sad to me. And it would have devastated Hope and broken her heart! She was such a standup gal with a strong moral compass. If she had lived, she would have been on Adam like white on rice, telling him to straighten up his act and clean up his messes! She'd make him own it!"

In addition, Coleman also expressed interest in returning to the show as Hope's long-lost twin sister. She adds, "Last time I was on the show, I pitched an idea to Steve Kent and Paul Rauch that Hope's mother had actually given birth to twins — which I realize never happens on a soap opera! — and that she decided to separate them. Hope was left on the doorstep of a church and raised by nuns until she was adopted by an elderly couple who raised her as their own child. I had the other twin, named Faith, being dropped somewhere in Texas, and she did not fare as well. She fell through the cracks of the foster care system, which happens all the time in our country, and as a result she turned out to be damaged goods. She's been there, done that, and she's an emotional wreck who has no idea how to connect with people or how to tell the truth. And, of course, she one day shows up in Genoa City with absolutely no idea who Hope was." In the end, the executives that she pitched her idea to were not interested in expanding the soap's cast.

== Storylines ==
In 1993, business tycoon Victor Newman (Eric Braeden) left his life in Genoa City behind, and he was presumed dead. He turned up in Kansas just in time to save a blind Hope Adams from a rapist. Victor and Hope bonded on her farm in Kansas until Victor decided to return home to his company, Newman Enterprises. When he heard from a friend that everyone in Genoa City thought he was dead, he decided to stay in Kansas with Hope. Victor and Hope's romance was cut short when Hope revealed that she was engaged to her longtime friend, Cliff Wilson. Victor decided that he should go home for good, but Hope couldn't bear to let him go. She broke off her engagement to Cliff, and she accompanied Victor back to Genoa City. When the pair arrived, Hope met Victor's longtime love and ex-wife, Nikki Newman (Melody Thomas Scott). Nikki was threatened by Hope, but Hope did not want to interfere with Victor and Nikki's relationship. She decided to return home to Kansas, but Victor followed her.

Once back in Kansas, Hope revealed to Victor that she was a virgin. Soon after, Victor and Hope had sex. Victor then proposed to Hope, and she accepted. In 1994, the engaged couple returned to Genoa City to wed. Nikki crashed the wedding upon hearing the news. Still, Victor and Hope were married in 1994. Then, Hope found out that she was pregnant. Victor and Hope found out that their baby could inherit Hope's blindness, and Victor urged Hope to have an abortion. Upset with Victor's idea, Hope returned to Kansas, and she began to spend time with Cliff Wilson again. Victor's friend, Douglas Austin, went to Kansas, and he urged Hope to return to Genoa City and to Victor. During the argument, Hope tripped over a chair, and she was rushed to the hospital. Victor went to Kansas to make sure that she was okay. The next day, Victor Adam Newman, Jr. was born. When Hope told Victor that she planned to raise Victor Jr. on her farm in Kansas, he became upset. Victor and Hope divorced in 1995. Victor then returned to Genoa City, leaving Hope to raise Victor Jr. alone in Kansas.

In 1996, Victor suffered injuries from a gunshot wound. He left town after his recovery, and he visited Hope in Kansas. She was then married to Cliff Wilson, who adopted Victor Jr. and changed his name to Victor Adam Wilson. Victor spent time with his son during his visit, but Cliff was adamant that the boy believed that he was his father. Victor soon returned to Genoa City and his longtime love, Nikki. Suddenly, Victor received word that Cliff was killed in a tractor crash (This was changed to a drunk driving incident as cause of death in 2020). He went to Kansas to support Hope, who was devastated when Cliff died from his injuries in 1996. Nikki ended her relationship with Victor when she believed that he left her for Hope. She then met Dr. Joshua Landers, and the two spontaneously married soon after. Victor decided to bring Hope and Victor Jr. back to Genoa City with him. He renovated the Newman Penthouse for Hope so that her blindness would not impede her navigational skills. Still, Hope didn't fit well in Victor's big-city lifestyle. She soon returned to Kansas with Victor Jr. in 1997.

Hope was not seen or heard from until 2006. Victor was diagnosed with epilepsy, and he returned to Kansas to get away from his busy life. Victor Jr. was away at soccer camp. Victor stayed with Hope for a while, and they returned to their quiet, simple lifestyle that they once shared. One day, Victor had a seizure on the floor of the farm, but Hope didn't realize that Victor was in trouble because of her blindness. Victor recovered from the seizure in time, and he told Hope that he just slipped and fell. Victor soon left Kansas, and he continued on his spiritual journey by traveling the world without contact from his family. Victor returned home when he received word that his son Nicholas Newman (Joshua Morrow) was missing and presumed dead. In 2007, Hope called Victor to tell him that she couldn't find their son. He had been hanging out with a bad crowd, and she lost contact with him. Victor traveled the globe, searching for Victor Jr. to no avail.

In 2008, Hope called Victor with tragic news: she was diagnosed with terminal pancreatic cancer. Victor sent his top doctors to Kansas to help Hope, but she was unable to be saved. Hope asked Victor to return to Kansas once more to say goodbye. Eventually, their son, now going by "Vic", returned to Kansas, shocked to see his mother's condition. Hope was sent home from the hospital to die in peace. Both Victor and Vic (Chris Engen) were with her when she announced her dying wish: she wanted Vic to be reunited with his biological father. After 27 years of uncertainty, Vic was shocked to discover that Victor was his father. Hope told Victor all about their son and his bright future. He attended Harvard University, and he was a successful stock broker in New York. She also mentioned how similar he was to his father. Hope died from her illness in 2008 with Victor and Vic at her side. After her death, Victor offered his son a job at Newman Enterprises, and both father and son returned to Genoa City together. Still, Vic began to go by the name Adam Wilson, angered that Victor abandoned him as a child.

In August 2010, Adam was in some trouble with the law after getting in over his head with scheming and revenge. Hope appeared to him in a dream, telling him that she can never rest in peace knowing what he has done. In addition, Hope appeared to an angry and lonely Victor in a dream at Christmastime, taking him on a trip through his past. She took him back to the orphanage where he grew up, and she showed him what Nikki had done for him throughout their relationship. She helped him change and reunite with his family for the holidays.

In 2012, Adam lost his sight due to Patty throwing poison in his face. When he was released from the hospital, Sharon went with him to the farm. While there, Adam spoke with his deceased mother.
