= Chris Engen =

Chris Engen may refer to:

- Chris Engen (actor), actor (The Young and the Restless)
- Chris Summers (drummer), real name Christer Engen, Norwegian drummer (Turbonegro)
