= Adam Newman =

Fictional character from The Young and the Restless

- The Young and the Restless character
- Mark Grossman as Adam Newman
- Portrayed by: Chris Engen (2008–2009); Michael Muhney (2009–2014); Justin Hartley (2014–2016); Mark Grossman (2019–present); Dane West (2020); (and child actors)
- Duration: 1995–1997; 2002; 2008–2016; 2019–present
- First appearance: April 24, 1995
- Created by: William J. Bell
- Introduced by: Edward J. Scott (1995); David Shaughnessy (2002); Josh Griffith (2008); Jill Farren Phelps (2014); Anthony Morina and Josh Griffith (2019)
In-universe information
- Other names: Spider; Gabriel Bingham; Victor Adam Newman, Jr; Victor Adam Wilson
- Occupation: Bartender (2010); Corporate businessman; Investment banker
- Family: Newman
- Parents: Victor Newman; Hope Wilson
- Adoptive parents: Cliff Wilson
- Stepmother: Nikki Newman
- Siblings: Victoria Newman; Nicholas Newman; Abby Newman
- Wife: Sharon Newman (2009–2010); Skye Lockhart (2010); Chelsea Lawson (2012–2013, 2014–2016)
- Sons: Connor Newman; Christian Newman
- Daughters: Ava Newman
- Grandparents: Albert Miller; Cora Miller
- Uncles: Matt Miller
- Nephews: Noah Newman; Reed Hellstrom; Johnny Abbott (adoptive); Dominic Newman-Abbott-Winters-Chancellor
- Nieces: Claire Newman; Cassie Newman (adoptive); Summer Newman; Faith Newman; Katie Newman

Adam Newman is a fictional character from The Young and the Restless, a soap opera on the CBS network. Adam was created by William J. Bell as the son of Victor Newman (Eric Braeden) and Hope Wilson (Signy Coleman) and was introduced on April 24, 1995. Adam left town two years after his birth and was raised in Kansas by his mother, growing up without knowing that Victor is his father.

In 2008, Chris Engen began portraying Adam as an adult. After a year in the role, Engen announced his exit from The Young and the Restless because of objections over his storyline, and Michael Muhney was recast in the role. Controversy arose two weeks after Muhney's debut when Adam seduced male character Rafe Torres (Yani Gellman). The media accused Engen of homophobia, but the actor dispelled these rumors, saying he was unhappy with his storyline long before the homosexuality plot twist was aired. In 2013, Muhney was fired from the role and made his last appearance on January 30, 2014; later that year, Justin Hartley was cast as Adam, who portrayed Adam for an additional two years before vacating the role on September 1, 2016. In May 2019, Mark Grossman took claim over the role, receiving his first credit as Adam on May 9.

The character is known as an anti-hero, described as "one of the most devious characters on daytime" by The Advocate. He is notable for his relationships with Sharon Newman (Sharon Case)—a pairing regarded as "dark" by SoapNet—and Chelsea Lawson (Melissa Claire Egan). Adam has a severely bad relationship with his father, who often does not accept him as part of his family.

Muhney, Hartley and Grossman's performances in the role have been met with favorable reception from audiences and critics. Muhney was nominated for the Daytime Emmy Award for Outstanding Lead Actor in a Drama Series for his portrayal of Adam in 2013. Hartley received a nomination in that same category in 2016. Meanwhile, Grossman earned himself an Emmy nomination in the Outstanding Supporting Actor in a Drama Series category in 2020.

== Casting and creation ==
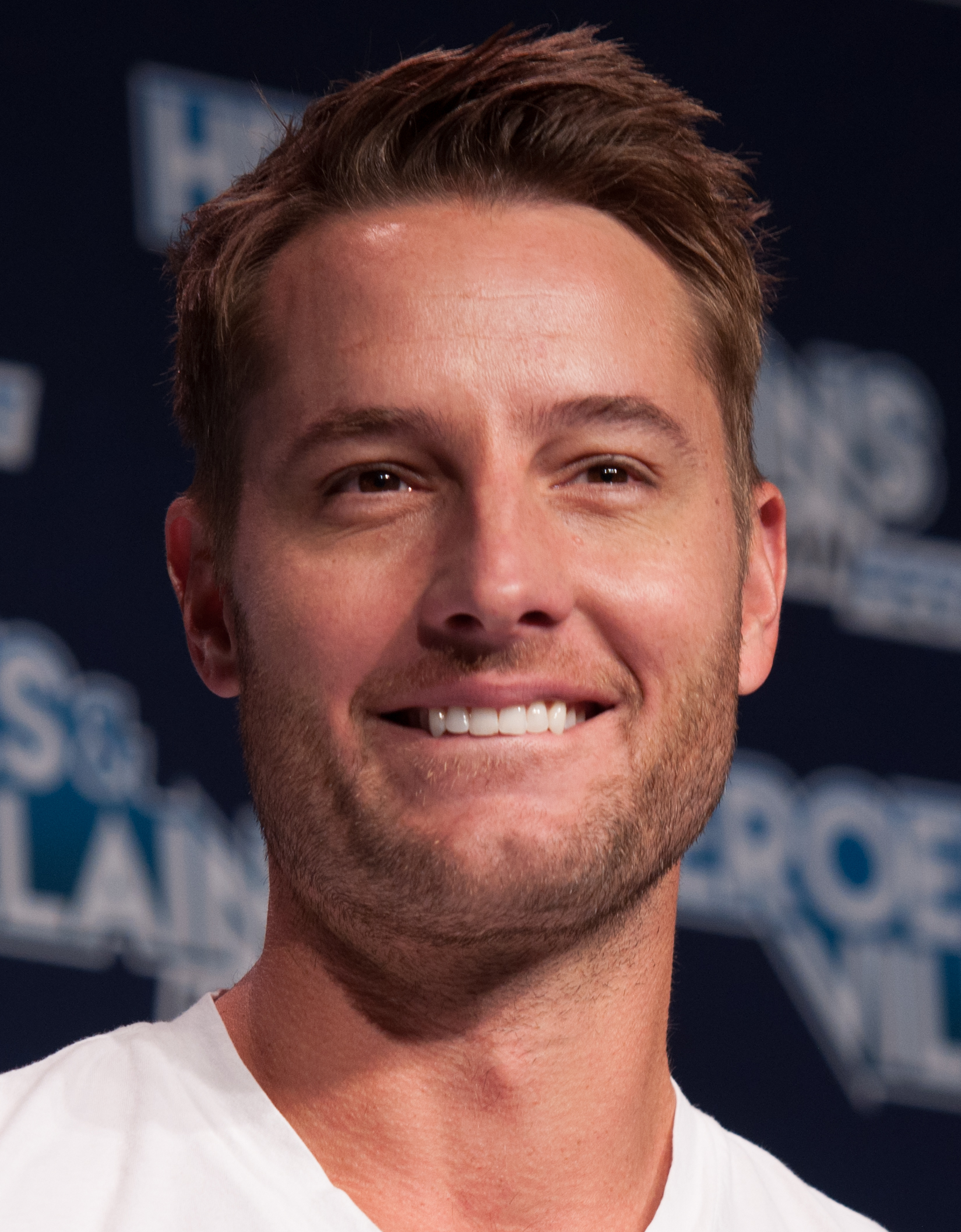
Justin Hartley was cast in the role of Adam in 2014, and exited in 2016, when the character was presumed dead.

Series creator William J. Bell created Victor Newman Jr. in 1995 as part of a social issue storyline. The plot involved Hope Adams' decision to carry Victor's child to term despite the possibility that he could inherit his mother's blindness, which could manifest later in life. Adam was first portrayed in 1995 by infant actors, including twins Celeste and Coryn Williams, followed by Danielle and Sabrina Helper and then Spencer Klass. Hayden Tank played the role from December 1996 to August 1997, and returned for a guest appearance on June 26, 2002. In 2008, it was announced that the character had been rapidly aged to an adult. Chris Engen assumed the role of Adam on February 12, 2008.

In May 2009, it was announced that Engen was leaving the program and that Muhney had immediately been recast in the role. Muhney made his first appearance as Adam on June 25, 2009. In 2011, Muhney signed a contract that would keep him in the role for an unspecified period. In April 2013, Muhney announced that he had signed a new contract that would expire in June 2015. In December, however, Muhney announced that he had been abruptly let go from the soap opera, with his last airdate on January 30, 2014. In August, it was announced that Hartley had been cast as Adam, due to begin taping in September; he first aired on November 5, 2014. Upon the news of his casting, the actor told TV Guide: "I'm so pumped about joining Y&R — I watch it all the time and can't wait to get in there and get my hands dirty!" In 2016, it was announced that Hartley had been cast in a regular role on the NBC drama series This Is Us, which was picked up by the network, placing his future with The Young and the Restless into question. In September 2016, Hartley confirmed his exit from the soap opera on his Facebook page, thanking fans for their support as well as encouraging them to watch him on This Is Us. He had last appeared on September 1, 2016.

In March 2019, Daytime Confidential broke the news that actor Mark Grossman had been cast in the role. He received his first credit in the role on May 9, although his first appearance would be on May 13, 2019. In 2020, child actor Dane West was cast in the role, portraying Adam in newly created flashbacks.

== Development ==
=== Characterization and portrayal ===
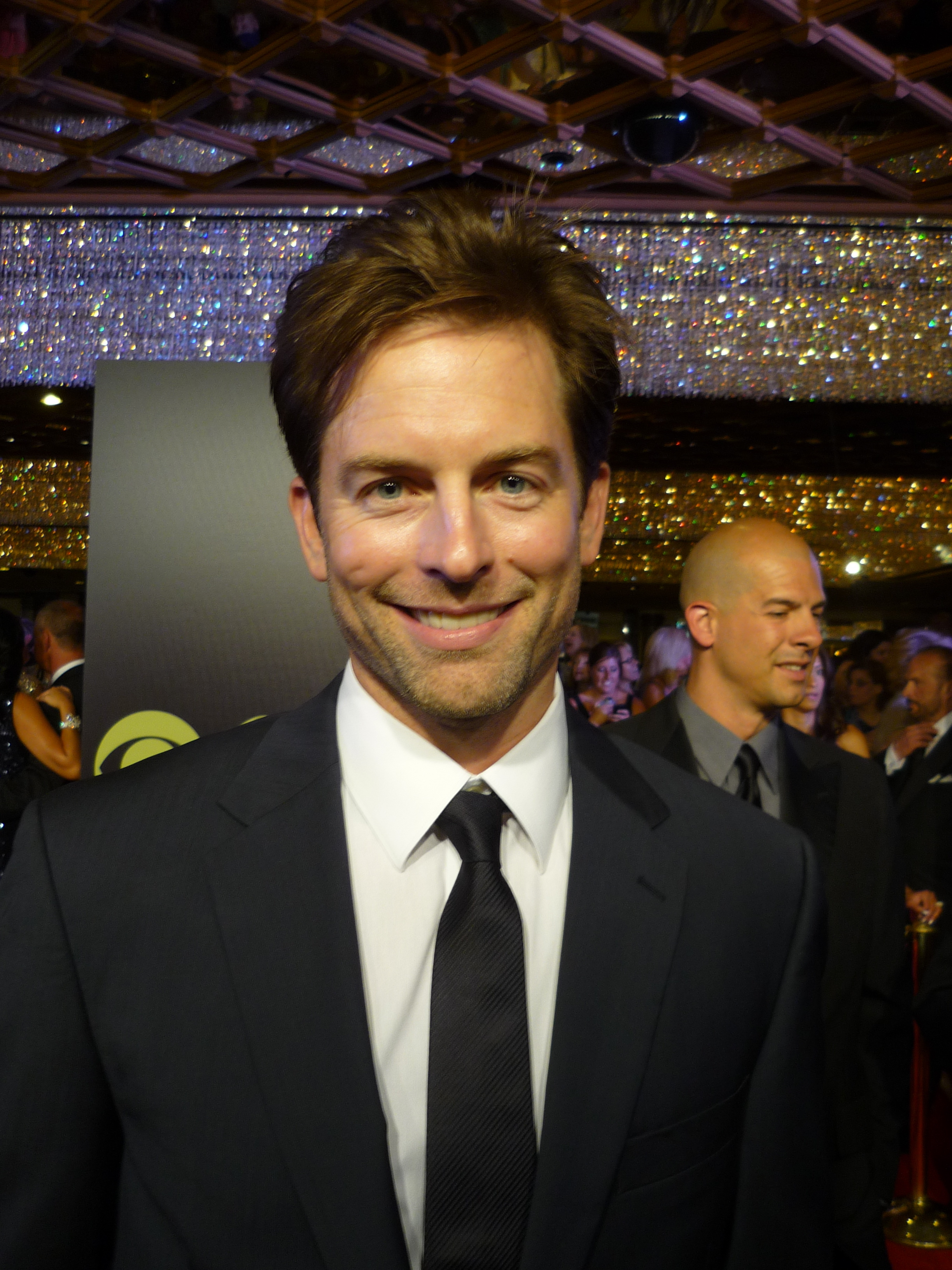
Michael Muhney described Adam as a "puppeteer" with "survival instinct", but also someone with a conscience.

Adam's off-screen background was established to reflect that of his father; the character was highly self-motivated, studying at college and beginning a career in finance. In an interview with Soaps In Depth, Engen said, "Luckily, I'm not going to be compared to anyone else ... anything I do and anything I try to project, and [the] kind of ideas that I have to influence the character are okay". The actor stated his intent to portray Adam as a "rich, three-dimensional character with ambitions, flaws, and the positive qualities of his mother Hope".

As the character's storyline progressed, he became "one of the most devious characters on daytime" as part of a Gothic plot in which Adam secretly torments Ashley, Victor's love interest, to get revenge on his father. The story called for Adam to be blind, with uncertainty whether his condition is genuine. Engen told Julie McElwain of Soaps In Depth that he was not sure how to portray the blindness. He said, "I didn't want to nail it on the head completely with the blindness, because I wasn't sure if the blindness was real. Signy [who portrayed Hope] won awards for her portrayal of retinitis pigmentosa, and I thought it would be a dishonor to that if I came too close to the mark." Engen said that he thought that former executive producers, Maria Arena Bell and Paul Rauch, and the writers "know what they're doing, and right now it would seem like Adam is instigating more ... drama." The actor worried whether the character's actions might lead to him becoming "irredeemable", but also said he took it as a challenge to make what Adam does "interesting and human".

"It is because of how he mixes it up. I guess there is no other way to describe it but being a catalytic character. It is nicer when you can be in the center of the hub of the wheel where the spokes all meet, so I have a lot of spokes sticking out from my character that takes him in a lot of directions. It makes it interesting. It is not just a paycheck."

— Muhney, when asked what he likes portraying about Adam (2013)

Muhney said in an interview that the plot point of seducing Rafe broadened Adam's horizons. He said, "What it did was move a character who represents a person who lives in Genoa City and moved him outside of a box that you can neatly check off. 'He is straight, he is this, or he is that,' and the fact that some lines are blurred makes him more real. When they did that with this character, I loved the opportunity to play into a different realm which is usually not touched upon on television." Muhney described the character as a "puppeteer" with "survival instinct", but also someone with a conscience. In another interview, when asked what he likes about portraying Adam, Muhney stated: "You want to play a catalytic character. You know a troublemaker is good business. You know someone who doesn't swim with the fishes, who swims upstream in the other direction, is someone who is going to cause friction and turbulence in storyline with other characters. I have been told by many of my cast members that the role to play is Adam. They say, "If I were to have a choice, the character I would want to play is your role, Adam."

=== Relationships ===
Adam's first romance was with Heather Stevens (Vail Bloom), which received viewer support. Engen said that he "thanked God" for that aspect of his storyline, that he felt Adam "genuinely loves" Heather and that she had been "the only light in this world of darkness that the character had lived in" since Engen started portraying the character.

Adam has been involved with his brother's ex-wife, Sharon Newman (Sharon Case)—a relationship which SoapNet described as "dark". Adam stole Sharon's newborn baby, Faith, and gave her to Ashley Abbott (Eileen Davidson)—whom he caused to have a miscarriage and a phantom pregnancy. Despite knowing this and seeing Sharon grieve, Adam bonded with her out of guilt; however, they fell in love and married. Muhney told SoapNet that Adam "unequivocally loves her 100%", and said, "You can argue as much logic as you want about what Adam has done and what he is doing." Sharon remained in love with Adam after his kidnapping of Faith was revealed. The soap's other characters, who viewed him as a criminal, were displeased with the romance. Case described Sharon's ability to forgive Adam as a "tough pill to swallow", and also compared it to Nick's love for Phyllis—who had "blown people up and ran people over". Jamey Giddens of Zap2it described Adam and Sharon's relationship as "inappropriate" yet "red-hot". Several of Sharon's friends, including her ex-husband Jack, disowned her because of the relationship. After Sharon's conviction for the murder of Adam's ex-wife Skye, she escaped after being sentenced to life imprisonment. During this storyline, Case still supported the couple—dubbed "Shadam" by viewers—saying that the pairing "took us all by surprise". Case also said, "That is what I was referring to with this storyline because of the pace and the vitality that "Shadam" has." While on the run, Sharon slept with a man named Sam when Adam thought she was dead. Feeling betrayed, Adam tricked her into a jailhouse wedding where he abandoned her, leaving Sharon heartbroken and angry.

Nicholas – Sharon's first husband and Adam's brother – later forced Sharon to get a restraining order against Adam. The night before it became active, she spent the night with Adam, who vowed to fight the order, refusing to give Sharon up. Jae' Jones from Yahoo! said that Sharon's actions "always" lead her back to Adam. Adam was attacked by Patty Williams (Stacy Haiduk), and his impaired vision returned. Sharon looked after Adam and even returned him to his mother's farm in Kansas where they reconnected. Adam proposed to her and they returned to Genoa City. However, Sharon ended their relationship shortly after learning of Adam's role in freeing Patty—who went on to wreak havoc and hurt loved ones—from a psychiatric hospital two years earlier. Although Sharon knew Adam had changed, she refused to bet anything on him.

Despite Adam's marriage to Chelsea Lawson (Melissa Claire Egan), he helped Sharon after she had a mental breakdown and burned down the Newman ranch. Case said that Sharon's relationship with Nick "held more weight", and that Sharon and Adam is "just as deep". Adam had an arsonist set fire to another building to avoid Sharon being implicated for the fire at the ranch. The arsonist burned down a restaurant owned by Chelsea's father. Chelsea became insecure and bitter towards Sharon, and was enraged at Adam for breaking the law to save Sharon. Chelsea warned Sharon to stay away from Adam; Sharon told her that Adam would never love Chelsea the way he loves her. Luke Kerr of Zap2It said that Chelsea was "out of her league" and the storyline was "fun".

Egan said: "I love working with Michael Muhney. I heard about him because my mom had watched Y&R before I joined. So when I told her my character was going to be mixed up with Adam, she went, 'Oh! He is so good, but so bad'". Egan said that her mother "told me he was a great character, but an evil one, so I was really excited. And now knowing Michael, it has been so much fun." She said that "everyone seems to think we have good on-screen chemistry" and that "it's an interesting energy between Chelsea and Adam being the "bad guys" in town." Egan said Adam was Sharon's biggest supporter when Chelsea had Billy's baby and gave him up.

Adam (Mark Grossman) was in a relationship with Sally Spectra played by (Courtney Hope), was currently expecting with his fourth child and his first daughter before the baby died in 2023.

Adam reunited with ex-wife Chelsea in March 2025 and is still in a relationship as of March 2026.

=== Controversial plot twist and recast ===
"I felt generally unhappy about my contribution to the show, and had greater and greater difficulty making any sense of the challenges they were asking me to face ... I was allowed ONE meeting with Maria Bell, and I called in sick ONCE in my 16 months on the show. In the end, I didn't feel that decisions were being made in my best interests, personally or professionally ... Ultimately, the producers were very understanding and amenable and I, in fact, worked until they told me they didn't need me anymore."

— Engen's posting on his Myspace page to as why he left The Young and the Restless (2009)

When news broke of Engen's exit from the show, reporters speculated that he had quit because of personal objections over an upcoming same-sex relationship between Adam and Rafe Torres (Yani Gellman). Commentators—including celebrity blogger Perez Hilton who wrote "homophobe" on an image of the actor—criticized Engen.

In an interview with TV Guide Canada, former executive producer and head writer Maria Arena Bell stated that while she would not comment on Engen's decision, she was "saddened that they had to recast because Engen was really gelling in the role", but added that she had "no doubt" that Muhney would make Adam his own.

In another interview, Eileen Davidson, who portrayed Ashley Abbott, said that she "couldn't judge" Engen's decision since it was a "personal one". Davidson said, "Everybody has his or her own demons—and makes their own choices due to their creative process." In other interviews, Eric Braeden, who portrays Adam's father Victor Newman, stated his disappointment with Engen's departure, and told Soap Opera Digest that he unsuccessfully tried to convince the actor to stay with the soap opera. Braeden stated, "He was somewhat disturbed by the fact that he was playing this evil character. I said, 'Listen, I remember Victor feeding rats to people.' I told him to embrace it because he had the most riveting storyline around, period." In another interview with Soaps In Depth, Braeden said that he too was "saddened by the fact that he left", saying it was a "hell of a role". Braeden also said, "Whatever personal reasons he has, you've got to respect that. But he was a very nice guy, very professional. We all liked working with him. We were shocked when he decided to leave, but that's his personal decision." After the controversy surrounding his departure from the show, Engen posted a message on his Myspace page stating he had been unhappy with Adam's storyline long before the homosexual plot twist had emerged.

=== Muhney's exit and controversial allegations ===
After the sudden announcement that Muhney had been fired from the role in December 2013, viewers and critics alike expressed their disappointment in the decision. Michael Ausiello of TVLine wrote that the news was the "worst Christmas present ever", as well as Jamey Giddens of Zap2it writing: "Outspoken and insanely-gifted, Michael Muhney has definitely shaken things up in daytime since joining The Young and the Restless. Whether he was demanding changes in the Daytime Emmy nomination process, or getting into fights with his TV pappy on Twitter, one thing was for certain — Muhney always brought it on screen as bad seed Adam Newman. Well, not anymore." Immediately after the news of his firing, Muhney conducted an interview with the Huffington Post and stated: "Part of me feels this is because I've always been outspoken, and sometimes I've been too outspoken. Sometimes I've walked around with a big backpack full of hubris. That is entirely on me. CBS, Sony, and Jill Phelps are not to blame for that." Muhney also said that the writers were planning to "take a break from Adam for 3 to 6 months" and then recast the role.

In January 2014, however, celebrity gossip site TMZ reported that according to multiple sources that the reason Muhney was allegedly let go from the soap was because Muhney had sexually harassed co-star Hunter King (who portrays Summer Newman). The site wrote: "38-year-old Muhney allegedly bullied and harassed 20-year-old Hunter King, who plays Summer on the show. She went to higher-ups and complained recently Muhney had fondled her breasts on 2 occasions — and she said both were unsolicited and unwanted." The rumor generated significant negative publicity for the soap opera; Margaret Eby of the New York Daily News wrote, "The set of "The Young and the Restless" may have turned into a real life soap opera thanks to star Michael Muhney, who was allegedly fired for groping one of his co-workers." Fox News reported that several viewers were upset by Muhney's firing and the sexual harassment allegations, writing: "Many Y&R fans were none too pleased to find out Muhney was leaving, and several blasted the allegations." TMZ later reported that angered viewers had paid US$785 to have an airplane fly over CBS Studios in Los Angeles with a banner to have Muhney rehired, and the plane flew three days later. Muhney made his final appearance on January 30, 2014. In August 2014, Muhney claimed on his Twitter page that the allegations were indeed false and it was only a salacious rumor.

== Storylines ==
Hope gives birth to Victor Adam Newman Jr. in 1995, and soon after she and Victor divorce, prompting Hope to move to Kansas with Victor Jr. He was raised believing Cliff Wilson was his father until June 2002, when Victor visited Kansas to see Victor Jr. Six years later in February 2008, Hope tells Victor that she is dying from pancreatic cancer, and tells their son—known as "Vic"—that Victor is his father. A Harvard Business School graduate, Vic is resentful of Victor for abandoning his own child. He later agrees to move to Genoa City with Victor and work at his company, Newman Enterprises, but still refuses to build a relationship with his father. Vic then begins using the name Adam Newman, and is resented by Victor's other children Victoria and Nicholas Newman (Amelia Heinle and Joshua Morrow) for splitting up their parents during Victor and Hope's marriage. Victor's girlfriend Sabrina Costelana (Raya Meddine) urges him to mend his relationships with his children. Adam then begins dating Heather Stevens (Vail Bloom), and Victor's dislike of her causes their romance to become secretive. When Victor is presumed dead while in Mexico searching for the men responsible for Sabrina's death, Adam takes over at Newman Enterprises, fires his siblings and instates Victor's nemesis Brad Carlton (Don Diamont). Adam's family are powerless to stop him after they discover Victor left most of his possessions to Adam in his will. Adam plots to frame Jack Abbott (Peter Bergman) for murder, but when Victor appears alive, Jack reverses the plot and Adam is framed for murder, resulting in his imprisonment. Heather begins to notice Adam's failing eyesight; he may have inherited his mother's blindness. After Adam is brutally beaten by an inmate, Victor has the charges against his son dropped.

In 2009, Adam becomes friends with Ashley Abbott (Eileen Davidson), who continuously hears a baby crying and finds things supposedly left for her by Sabrina, who is dead. The housekeeper Estella Munoz (Anne Betancourt) is blamed and arrested; however, Adam was secretly gaslighting Ashley. Adam dresses as Sabrina, scares Ashley and she falls down a staircase, causing her to miscarry her child, whose father is Victor. Adam then blackmails her doctor, Charles Taylor, into telling her that her child was still alive. Rafe Torres (Yani Gellman) is appointed to investigate Adam, who seduces him to divert his attention from Adam's criminal activity. Heather discovers Adam's affair with Rafe and ends her relationship with Adam. Ashley is admitted to a psychiatric hospital, where a pregnant Sharon Newman (Sharon Case) is also staying. Sharon goes into labor and Adam steals her daughter, Faith, and passes her off as Ashley's child. Sharon believes her child had died, and guilt-ridden, Adam pursues a relationship with Sharon and they elope, but she leaves him when she remembers elements that contradict her losing her child. A note from a dying Charles Taylor saying that Ashley had miscarried and Faith is really Sharon and Nicholas’ daughter is found. Adam is jailed again but gets the insane Patty Williams (Stacy Haiduk) to help him escape to attend a masquerade ball, where he unsuccessfully begs Sharon for forgiveness. An explosion at the ball occurs and a burned corpse is positively identified as Adam. Nicholas is arrested for Adam's murder. The corpse is actually that of Richard Hightower, to whom Adam had donated bone marrow and carries Adam's DNA. Adam meets up with Skye Lockhart (Laura Stone) and they plot a confidence trick together, but Adam still dreams of Sharon.

Adam and Skye, now married, return to Genoa City to testify on Nicholas’ behalf, but Adam fakes a mental breakdown and is sent to the psychiatric hospital where Patty is being treated. She recollects the night of Hightower's death to the district attorney, but Adam confuses her, leads her out of the hospital, gives her a new identity and tells her never to return. Adam and Sharon reunite in New Orleans, just before he faces charges for murdering Skye. Sharon travels to Hawaii to prove Skye is alive, but Skye falls to her death in a volcano and Sharon is arrested for her murder. Adam helps Sharon to escape from prison and flee the state, and she is presumed dead when her burned-out car is found. Sharon is actually carjacked and the carjacker died in the fire. Adam is devastated and still looks for proof that Sharon did not kill Skye. He eventually finds proof but when he discovers that Sharon had been living with a veterinarian in New Mexico, he disposes of the evidence in a river in July 2011. Adam then plots with Diane Jenkins (Maura West) to make Victor suffer, almost framing him for Diane's murder. However, when Diane's murdered body is found, a six-month investigation ensues with Adam as an initial suspect. Adam again takes over at Newman Enterprises when Victor falsely confesses to the murder and later reunites with Sharon, but she leaves him again when his scheme against Patty is revealed. Adam later befriends Chelsea Lawson (Melissa Claire Egan) and they begin dating in April 2012, later eloping to Kansas where Sharon tries to stop the wedding. Chelsea becomes pregnant but miscarries in a car accident with Summer Newman (Hunter King). Adam takes in Sharon, who is mentally unstable, and gets her the help she needs; Chelsea disapproves. After he is reinstated as chief executive officer at Newman Enterprises and shares a kiss with Sharon, Adam promises Chelsea they can move to Paris, but when he cannot leave the company they decide to divorce. While trying to save Victor, Adam is shot at Victor's wedding in March 2013, and they mend their relationship by working together at Newman Enterprises. Chelsea discovers she is pregnant again, but tells Adam the child was fathered by Dylan McAvoy (Steve Burton). After Adam finds out Connor is his son, he plans to go for full custody and plans to cut Chelsea out of Connor's life, believing she is an unfit mother. Victor and Adam's partnership at the company ends months later when it is revealed that Adam's silent partner in taking Newman Enterprises private again was Jack. When Victor announces Katherine Chancellor (Jeanne Cooper) left her company, Chancellor Industries, to him in her will, Adam leaves him all of his shares in the company and resigns. Shortly after, Adam suspects he may have struck Delia Abbott (Sophie Pollono) with his car while driving on a dark road. After Delia dies in the accident, investigations begin to find the driver, leaving Adam guilt-ridden. Chelsea moves in with him to help take care of Connor, and they eventually reunite.

After not telling anyone about hitting Delia, Adam fears the investigation is closing in on him. He names Jack Connor's godfather and makes him promise to protect him should anything happen to him, and then proposes to Chelsea again and asks her to move to Paris with him like they had planned during their first marriage. At the same time, Victor's private investigation on the hit-and-run driver leads him to Adam. He agrees to not turn him in as long as he can take part in Connor's life; a role he had initially refused him. Adam agrees as he and Chelsea remarry. Days before their flight to Paris, Delia's father Billy Abbott (Billy Miller) put the pieces together and realizes Adam is the one who killed his daughter. He holds him at gunpoint and demands he drive them to places where milestones in Delia's life occurred. While driving, Adam attempts to grab the gun as a shot is fired and the car drives off a ravine. One of them staggers away from the crash and collapses, revealed to be Billy. Nick and Paul Williams (Doug Davidson) find the overturned vehicle as it catches fire and explodes. Adam's body is thrown from the vehicle, is not recovered and he is presumed dead, devastating Chelsea just as news that Adam killed Delia breaks. However, Adam's bloody hand is later shown to be moving, alluding that he survived. Soon after, he is shown to be lying in a bed, being held captive by an unknown captor. Later Victor informs Chelsea that his investigators have found Adam's remains, but elsewhere Adam is seen paying off Victor's investigator, confirming that Adam has faked his death.

In November 2014, Adam is revealed to be recovering from multiple facial reconstruction surgeries, and is in the care of Sage Warner (Kelly Sullivan). When Adam is told of Chelsea and Billy's new relationship he makes a plan to reunite with Chelsea and their son Connor. He eventually recovers enough to have the bandages removed from his face and it is revealed that his face had been replaced by Gabriel Bingham, the man who died saving Adam's life. Under the alias of Gabriel, Adam returns to Genoa City married to Sage to claim Gabe's inheritance from Constance Bingham and avoid law enforcement after he killed Billy's daughter. Posing as husband and wife, Gabriel (Adam) and Sage buy an apartment across the hall from Chelsea and her boyfriend, Billy. Billy later invites Sage and Adam to stay at the Abbott mansion, as their apartments caught fire, and he was suspicious that Adam, posing as Gabriel, was getting close to his now fiancée, Chelsea. Sage also gets involved with Adam's brother, Nicholas Newman (Joshua Morrow), she reveals to Nick that she is married to Gabriel but it is only a marriage of convenience. As the pair grow closer, one day Sharon walked in on them having sex and Nick's bar, the Underground. Sage later tells Adam that she is seeing Nick, and Adam is extremely taken aback yet unhappy. However, he uses this information to seek comfort from Chelsea, making her think that he is in love with Sage, and that she does not feel the same. Chelsea confronts Sage and demands an explanation. Sage tells Chelsea that she has been played this whole time, and that all the events that lead up to "Gabriel" and Chelsea's friendship was a scam. She hints to Chelsea that Gabriel isn't who she really thinks he is, almost revealing his true identity.

Adam and Sage meet up at the Athletic Club to meet with the attorney who is in charge of giving them Constance's inheritance. Sage lashes out at "Gabriel" in front of the attorney, tells him that he does not deserve the inheritance, and that she is filing for divorce. She later runs into Nick, tells her she has moved out and is divorcing Gabriel. After telling him that he's the reason why she has done this, they make love in her suite. Sage marries Nick and Adam reconnects with Chelsea - confessing his true identity. When the truth behind Adam's true identity comes out, it puts a brief strain on Sage's marriage to Nick. Sage becomes pregnant and when she accidentally sees Adam in Chancellor Park they have a heated argument. She goes into labor and Adam helps her deliver the premature baby Christian Newman. When Christian passes away suddenly in the weeks following his birth, it is revealed that Adam is the birth father of Christian, not Nick, unbeknownst to Sage's knowledge. Riddled with grief, Sage grows distant from Nick; the pair eventually reconcile and plan to adopt a child but it falls through. Sage then grows an attachment to Sharon's son, Sullivan, who is later discovered to actually be Christian; confronting Sharon, Sage demands her son be returned to her. When Sharon refuses, Sage leaves and attempts to find Nick. Becoming distracted while driving on her cell phone, Sage enters into a car accident; discovered by Sharon, Sage holds Christian in her arms for the final time before dying on April 29, 2016, from the wreck. For the next couple of weeks Sage appeared in Sharon's dreams, haunting Sharon to tell Nick that Sully is really Christian and Sharon confesses it to Nick.

Adam and Chelsea slowly begin to piece their lives back together with plans to relocate to Paris, until Victor stepped in to sue for custody of Connor, keeping them in Genoa City. Adam would stand trial for his role in Delia's death. He was sentenced to ten years in prison. Upon leaving the courthouse, he was run over by an unknown assailant. Christine later found the car at a nearby motel. The car turned out to be a rental and it was revealed that Chloe Mitchell (Elizabeth Hendrickson) was behind the attack after Kevin Fisher (Greg Rikaart) found a surveillance picture that showed Chloe behind the wheel. Adam regains consciousness after the surgery and expressed no ill will towards Chloe.

In August 2016, Chloe returned to Genoa City again to frame Adam for poisoning Constance Bingham. When Adam found the evidence to clear his name, it disappeared and he winds up in prison. Victor later helped Adam escape and planned to help Adam leave the country with Chelsea and Connor. Adam decided to let Nick care for and be a father to Christian. Adam and Chelsea escape with Connor to a cabin. Connor, at the time, was sick so Chelsea called Nick to help her get medication for Connor in town while Adam stayed at the cabin, seen as he was wanted and Chelsea didn't want him risked getting arrested. After Nick and Chelsea, Chloe appeared at the cabin and shot Adam with a tranquilizer gun. She then revealed that she had never forgiven him for Delia's death and that she wanted him to suffer the same fate Delia did. When Chelsea returned with Nick, the cabin exploded and Adam was presumed dead as DNA evidence indicated that he was inside at the time.

In April 2019, Victor met with a mysterious man in Las Vegas. Nikki becomes suspicious and wants to find out what Victor was hiding so she hires Rey Rosales (Jordi Vilasuso) to track him down. Sharon later joins Rey on his investigation and they both leave for Las Vegas. Later, Victor catches onto them and makes a surprise visit to their hotel room, where he revealed to Sharon that Adam is confirmed alive and survived the explosion at the cabin. He also said Adam has amnesia and has no memory prior to the explosion. He asked Sharon to meet with Adam to help him regain his memory and gave her Adam's phone number. Sharon later meets with Adam at an apartment after he texted her the location. The two talk about their past and how they were connected. Sharon then convinces Adam to return to Genoa City to see if his brain will trigger any memories, in which he agrees. Soon after Adam returns to town, he is shot by an unknown assailant, traumatizing him enough to gain his memories back. After recovering from surgery, he hires a private investigator to track down Chloe Mitchell, who he affirms shot him. Adam later finds out that Chelsea got remarried and that her new husband adopted Connor. Devastated by this news, he tries to get custody of his other son, Christian, who is fathered by Nick. Adam turns to Phyllis to hack into Nick's company Dark Horse and tries to make a deal with his brother, he can keep his company in exchange for custody of Christian. Nick doesn't give into Adam's threats and gives him the keys to Dark Horse, but Adam knew Nick wouldn't have chosen the company over Christian and only used this situation as a warning to Nick. Kevin returns to Genoa City and tells Adam that he had kidnapped Phyllis, who he thought was his new girlfriend as he wanted to use her to make Adam release Chloe who he knows had tracked her down and had her kidnapped. Adam makes a deal with Kevin, if he wants to be reunited with Chloe he needs to work for him to find dirt on Nick as leverage to use it against him in the custody battle for Christian. Kevin hesitated at first but ultimately agreed for Chloe's sake. Kevin soon discovers scandalous security camera footage of Nick pulling off a mask looking like J.T. Hellstrom. Kevin gives Adam the information and he agrees to release Chloe. Phyllis returned to town and believed that Adam was the one behind her kidnapping so she went to Vegas to find dirt on him. Adam is shocked when Phyllis reveals that she discovered his mysterious connection with Chance Chancellor and blackmails Adam into giving her control over Dark Horse, which does indeed does. Soon after Chelsea returns to Genoa City and tells Adam to let her go but her husband Calvin Boudreau ends up suffering a heart attack and dies. Subsequently, she moves in with Nick and enters a relationship with him which devastates Adam. Adam then sleeps with Sharon and afterwards decides to drop the custody suit for Christian. A few weeks later, a receives a cryptic message from an unknown person telling him to meet him at a roadside and when he arrives Billy comes speeding out with a car in an attempt to kill him. But Chloe pushed him out of the way saving him. Adam is now under the impression that this attempted hit and run was from the machinations of Victor since he gave him a warning to leave town a couple weeks prior to this event. Adam takes matters into his own hands to exact revenge against his father by switching his medication out with a much higher dosage. Victor and the rest of the family caught on to Adam's revenge plot and decided to use this to their own advantage by having Victor fake his death. However, their plan ends up backfiring on them when Adam frames Victoria for it by placing Nate's tablet that included all of Victor's vital health information on it, in her office desk. Victoria is later released and Victor lures Adam back to the ranch where he reveals himself alive. The father and son duo have an emotional conversation with Adam telling Victor that all he's ever wanted from him more than anything was his respect. Adam then comes to the decision to leave Genoa City and go back to Vegas. Adam returns under the identity of Spyder and returns to the poker games, but returns to town when Connor begins having trouble. Chelsea pasts comes back to haunt her when a man by the name of Simon Black (Jeffrey Vincent Parise) arrives in Genoa City claiming to be her late husband, Calvin, brother and wanted all the money he left her. Simon threatens Chelsea that if he doesn't get what he wants he intends on harming her son Connor. Chelsea was unable to retrieve the money since she had asked Kevin to launder the money. Simon takes The Grand Phoenix hostage and holds Chelsea, Connor and Adam hostage at gun point. Adam and Chelsea pleads with Simon to not hurt Connor but eventually they are rescued by Chance Chancellor when he knocks Simon out. After the traumatic event, Connor begins having nightmares which forces Adam and Chelsea to spend much more time together in order to help their son. A few weeks later Adam and Chelsea got back together and Adam proposes to her at Victor's gala. Adam, Chelsea, and Connor go on a trip to Kansas where Adam reconnects with his old friend Alyssa Montalvo.

== Reception ==
"As Adam Newman, who has seen some very dark days, and who has perpetrated some very dark misdeeds to many a resident in Genoa City, Muhney had made the role of Adam one-of-a-kind on the soap landscape."

— Michael Fairman of On-Air On-Soaps on Muhney's portrayal (2013)

Soaps In Depth reported that Engen quickly gained viewer support after joining the cast as Adam, as did the character's romance with Heather. The support continued when the character took a dark turn. Engen said, "To think there was any likability left in the character baffles me! I'm very grateful to the fans ... they've been so supportive." The actor said fans wanted Adam either redeemed or turned into a gray character. Davidson credited the character's likability to Engen's looks, saying, " ... he really nailed this character. Chris' all-American looks add another layer to this story: he looks like he regrets being so evil, but he can't help himself. When Chris informed me he was leaving, I told him he really accomplished something by being so likable playing this villain." Nelson Branco repeatedly praised Engen's acting and Adam's storyline with Ashley and Victor, saying, "[t]he Haunting of Ashley is fast becoming one of my favorite all-time soap storylines ever. It's so 1970s. I have no doubt former Another World master scribe and Paul Rauch BFF/frenemy, Harding Lemay, is freaking if he's watching this gothic, macabre and super-creepy mystery. Moreover, camp-ilicious Chris Engen (Adam) is stealing the story with his very bitchy, and sexy performance of a deranged son scorned." Soaps In Depth also commended Adam's storyline. The magazine awarded Engen a gold star for portraying Adam as a gray character with "sardonic humor". Soap Opera Digest named Engen "performer of the week" for his final scenes as Adam, saying the actor "gave a performance that elevated Adam from an average villain to a complex mastermind".

The story of Adam causing Ashley's miscarriage was named "editor's choice" by the magazine. Engen was nominated for a SoapCentral Award for Outstanding Supporting Actor in 2009. Some fans were upset that Adam and Rafe's "sex scene" was implied rather than shown onscreen; Branco spoke out about the issue, saying, "[f]ilming a sex scene between a straight and gay man could come off as offensive. Firstly, Adam would have to appear uncomfortable in the situation which could anger gay right groups, etc." Muhney also approved of the decision not to show the sex scene, saying, "[f]or me, the way it was done was tasteful and it almost makes the audience wonder what exactly happened. You can create that in your head and try to interpret it by how the characters reacted afterwards."

Muhney's performance in the role, has been met with critical acclaim, having garnered him his first nomination for the Daytime Emmy Award for Outstanding Lead Actor in a Drama Series in 2013. Branco referred to him "as the most-talked-about recast in Y&R history" and praised his debut performance on the show. Denette Wilford of TV Guide Canada also complimented the actor's portrayal of Adam, saying, "[v]iewers aren't supposed to empathize with him, but his portrayer managed to make it happen—a testament to Muhney." Michael Jensen of AfterElton.com wrote that viewers enjoyed the character as portrayed by Muhney. The actor said he received both positive and negative reviews from online fans. Paulette Cohn of About.com wrote that Adam was one of "daytime's best villains". Muhney's onscreen romance with Chelsea has received praise; Zap2it placed them at number three on their "Top 10 Soap Opera Couples of 2012" list. Writing for Music Times, Cate Meighan observed that Muhney's performance kept "longtime fans glued to their television", noting that ratings dropped following his exit.

Upon Grossman's casting in 2019, many discussed his noticeably younger appearance compared to his predecessors. Soaps.com editor Lori Wilson discussed this at length, suggesting that Grossman's casting brings the character back to his initial age-range, stating: "Recasting with a noticeably younger actor is a curious choice, but character-wise, a 32-year-old Adam is closer to the character’s real age than the other previous incarnations." The following year, the website cited Grossman's casting as one of the all-time best recasts on a soap opera.

In 2020, Candace Young from Soaps She Knows put Adam on her list of the hottest soap opera villains, saying "Adam Newman has a horrific history of malicious acts and can be as cold and calculating as they come. He's a looker though, and his villainy is tempered by the deep love he feels for the women in his life and the underlying pain of his difficult relationship with his father. When Adam shows his vulnerable side it's swoon-worthy." In 2021, Richard Simms from Soaps She Knows noted how the audience "never took" to Adam's romance to Heather. In 2022, Charlie Mason from Soaps She Knows placed Adam 20th on his list of the best 25 characters from The Young and the Restless, commenting "Good and bad have no meaning, really, for Victor's younger son. As a result, whether he's been played by Michael Muhney, Justin Hartley or Mark Grossman, we’ve been riveted, poised on the fine line between rooting for and against the schemer."
