= William J. Bell (producer) =

American screenwriter (1927–2005)

- William J. Bell in 2003
- Born: William Joseph Bell; March 6, 1927; Chicago, Illinois
- Died: April 29, 2005 (aged 78); Los Angeles, California
- Education: University of Michigan
- Occupations: Writer, producer
- Years active: 1956–1998 (as a writer); 1973–2005 (as a producer)
- Spouse: Lee Phillip Bell (m. 1954)
- Children: 3, including Bradley Phillip Bell and Lauralee Bell Martin

William Joseph Bell (March 6, 1927 – April 29, 2005) was an American screenwriter and television producer, best known as the creator of the soap operas Another World, The Young and the Restless and The Bold and the Beautiful.

== Early life ==
Bell was born and raised in Chicago as an only child. His father was an accountant for the Link-Belt Company. His mother was primarily a homemaker, with a part-time job with Mrs. Steven's Candies. (In later years, his parents adopted a daughter.) Bell grew up listening to radio soap operas when he came home from school for lunch and late at night, including Life Can Be Beautiful, The Romance of Helen Trent and Our Gal Sunday. As a depression-era child, he would work at various odd jobs on weekends to help the family. In high school, he participated in the ROTC. After serving in the Navy as a corpsman, he attended the University of Michigan.

== Career ==
=== Chicago radio writer ===
At the age of 21, Bell worked at WJJD radio as a writer for two shows, with the focus being teen problems. That work led him to seek a job at WBBM radio as a comedy writer; specifically, character-oriented comedy, rather than jokes. He worked there for about three years.

=== Advertising industry ===
Bell went to McCann Erickson, then the second-largest advertising agency worldwide. He wrote radio and television commercials for Standard Oil of Indiana, the agency's biggest account; he was subsequently promoted to account executive, responsible for five small accounts. After three years there. Bell was offered an account executive position with Cunningham & Walsh.

=== Procter and Gamble Productions ===
During his time as a comedy writer at WBBM radio in Chicago, he made a call to Irna Phillips' secretary Rose Cooperman asking her if Phillips had an opening for a writer, as she was a well-known soap opera creator and Bell had become aware that Phillips also resided in Chicago. Cooperman said Phillips did have an opening. While Bell was composing a sample script, he was informed that the writer who was supposedly leaving had decided to stay, so the writing job was not available. Later, during the time that Bell was in the advertising business, he ran into Phillips' niece. She mentioned him to her aunt and Phillips remembered who he was; she also knew his wife, who was a well-known celebrity due to her work on local television.

He started his writing career on Guiding Light and then moved over to As the World Turns, working under Phillips; Phillips' other protegee at the time was Agnes Nixon. Bell co-created Another World with Phillips in 1964. In 1965, he co-created the primetime As the World Turns spinoff Our Private World.

=== Days of Our Lives ===
In 1966, he was hired as head writer of the then-struggling soap Days of Our Lives. Bell was credited with the show's initial surge of popularity. Bell changed the dynamics of soaps when he began focusing on sexuality. Formerly, soap operas did not delve into the sexual side of their romances. He intended to leave the show around 1972 when he began creating his own show The Young and the Restless, but the owners of the show sued him, and he agreed to write long-term story projections for them. He remained as head writer until 1975.

=== The Young and the Restless ===
In 1972, CBS executives wanted a new daytime serial that was youth oriented. William along with his wife Lee Phillip Bell created The Young and the Restless for the network under the working title, The Innocent Years. However, before the show went into production, he had to rename the series as Bell mentioned..."We were confronted with the very disturbing reality that young America had lost much of its innocence,". "Innocence as we had known and lived it all our lives had, in so many respects, ceased to exist." They renamed the series The Young and the Restless because they felt it "reflected the youth and mood of the early seventies." He spent between ten and sixteen hours a day writing stories.

The Young and the Restless debuted on March 26, 1973. Although slow to rise in the ratings (he got very frustrated and asked head of CBS Daytime Bud Grant to cancel the serial), CBS had faith in the show and gave it a chance. Y&R was credited for breathing new life into the daytime serial, with its brightness, humor and cutting-edge storylines. As he did on Days of our Lives, Bell saw to sexuality also playing a major role in the stories. Bell guided Y&R as head writer from 1973 until stepping down in 1998, the longest tenure of any head writer in soap opera history. Y&R has been the highest-rated soap on the air since 1988 in households, and 1989 among viewers.

==== Controversy ====
Brenda Dickson, an original cast member of The Young and The Restless, claims that Bell blacklisted her after 15 years on the show after they partook in a secret love affair. He then went on to wreak havoc on her personal and professional life by hiring "Mafia cartel judges and attorneys" to "ruin" her life. As a result, she ended up "broke and homeless" and has been blocked from working ever since.

=== The Bold and the Beautiful ===
In 1986, he began working on creating another soap for CBS Daytime, but plans were halted until the end of the year when the network decided to cancel the soap Capitol and needed a replacement. He created The Bold and the Beautiful, which debuted on March 23, 1987. B&B is known for its glamorous look as it is set in the fashion industry. It followed Y&R and has been a ratings success as well.

== Personal life ==
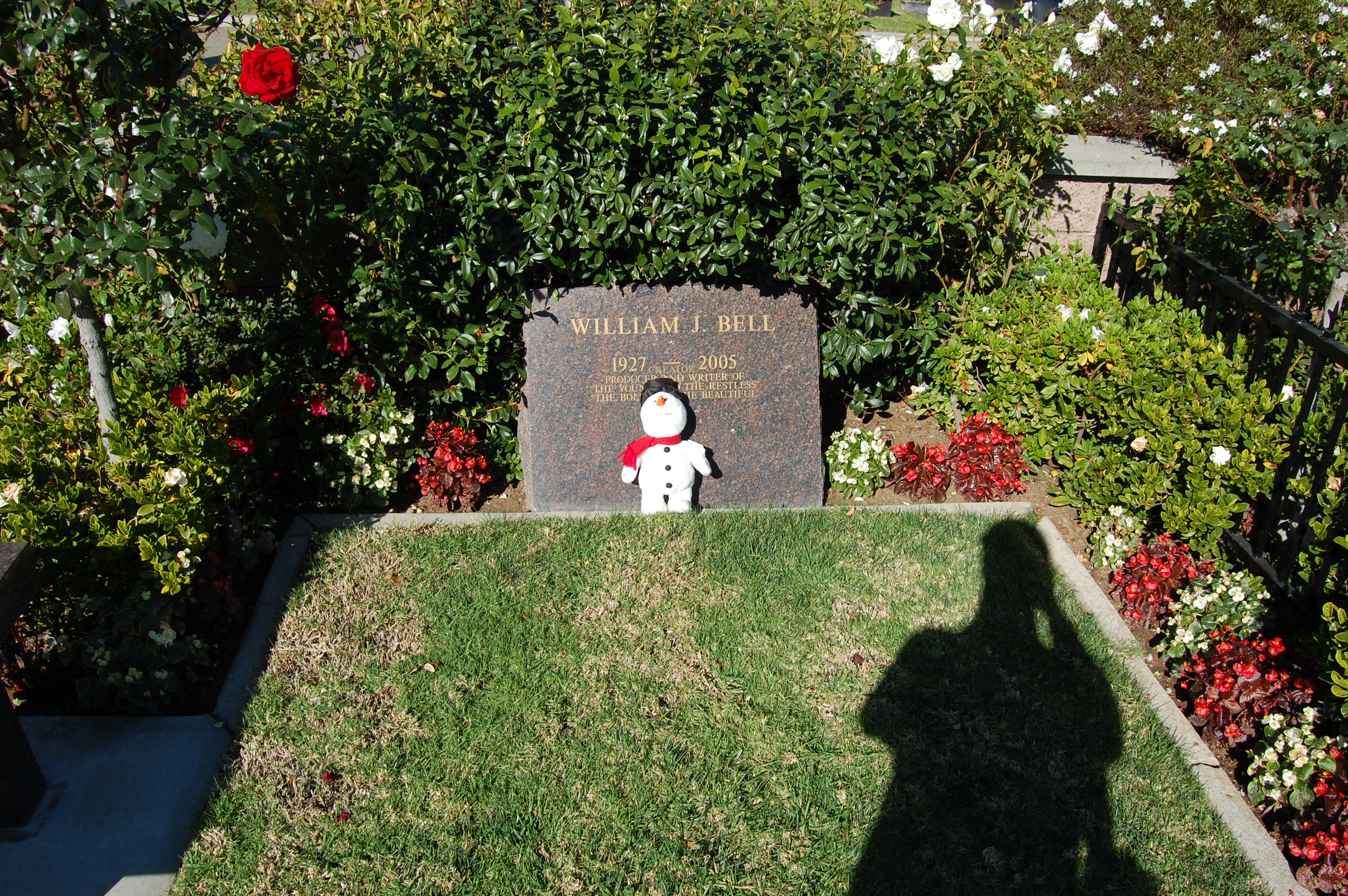
William J. Bell's grave

Bell was married to former talk show host Lee Phillip Bell (born Loreley June Phillip), who co-created The Young and the Restless and The Bold and the Beautiful with him. Their three children, William James Bell, Bradley Phillip Bell, Lauralee Bell Martin, and relatives all been involved in the family’s businesses in some capacity.

On April 29, 2005, Bell died at age 78 from complications of Alzheimer's disease. He is buried at Westwood Village Memorial Park Cemetery in Los Angeles.

Bell acquired the Wallace Neff designed Sol Wurtzel House in Bel Air, Los Angeles in 1991.

== Awards and recognition ==
- In 1992, he was awarded the Lifetime Achievement Award at the 19th annual Daytime Emmy Awards.

== Producing and writing credits ==
Another World

- Co-Creator (with Irna Phillips)
- Co-Head Writer: May 1964 – March 1965

As the World Turns

- Co-Head Writer: 1965–1966
- Writer: 1950s–1960s

The Bold and the Beautiful

- Co-Creator (with Lee Phillip Bell)
- Executive Producer: March 23, 1987 – January 11, 1996 (with Lee Phillip Bell: June 7, 1988- January 11, 1996)
- Head Writer: March 23, 1987 – May 4, 1993
- executive story consultant: May 5, 1993 - July 31, 1996

Days of Our Lives

- Head Writer: July 5, 1966– May 6, 1975

Guiding Light

- Writer: 1950s

Our Private World

- Co-Creator (with Irna Phillips)

The Young and the Restless

- Co-Creator (with Lee Phillip Bell)
- Executive Producer: January 4, 1982 – November 13, 1987, (with H. Wesley Kenney: January 4, 1982 - December 11, 1986) January 12, 2004 – April 29, 2005
- Senior Executive Producer: November 16, 1987 – January 9, 2004
- Head Writer: March 26, 1973 – July 3, 1998
- Executive Story Consultant: July 6, 1998 – April 29, 2005

== Legacy ==
As of December 2020, Bell holds the distinction of having created the largest number of soap opera characters that are still appearing, with over 25 characters on either The Young and the Restless, The Bold and the Beautiful, or Days of Our Lives such as:

- Doug Williams (Days of Our Lives) - 1970–1984, 1986–1987, 1993–1996, 1999–present (played by Bill Hayes)
- Jill Foster Abbott (The Young and the Restless) - 1973–present (currently played by Jess Walton)
- Maggie Horton (Days of Our Lives) - 1973–1984, 1985–present (played by Suzanne Rogers)
- Paul Williams (The Young and the Restless) - 1978–present (played by Doug Davidson)
- Nikki Newman (The Young and the Restless) - 1978–present (currently played by Melody Thomas Scott)
- Victor Newman (The Young and the Restless) - 1980–2009, 2010–present (played by Eric Braeden)
- Jack Abbott (The Young and the Restless) - 1980–present (currently played by Peter Bergman)
- Esther Valentine (The Young and the Restless) - 1982–present (played by Kate Linder)
- Ashley Abbott (The Young and the Restless) - 1982–1995, 1996–2007, 2008–2012, 2013–present (currently played by Eileen Davidson)
- Traci Abbott (The Young and the Restless) - 1982–1996, 1999, 2001–2002, 2006, 2007–present (played by Beth Maitland)
- Victoria Newman (The Young and the Restless) - 1982–2003, 2005–present (currently played by Amelia Heinle)
- Lauren Fenmore (The Young and the Restless) - 1983–1995, 2000, 2001–present (played by Tracey E. Bregman)
- Christine Blair (The Young and the Restless) - 1983–2001, 2002–2006, 2009–present (played by Lauralee Bell)
- Eric Forrester (The Bold and the Beautiful) - 1987–present (played by John McCook)
- Ridge Forrester (The Bold and the Beautiful) - 1987–2012, 2013–present (currently played by Thorsten Kaye)
- Brooke Logan (The Bold and the Beautiful) - 1987–present (played by Katherine Kelly Lang)
- Donna Logan (The Bold and the Beautiful) - 1987–1994, 1996–1998, 2000–01, 2004, 2006–present (currently played by Jennifer Gareis)
- Katie Logan (The Bold and the Beautiful) - 1987–1989, 1991–2004, 2007–present (currently played by Heather Tom)
- Nicholas Newman (The Young and the Restless) - 1989–present (currently played by Joshua Morrow)
- Chloe Mitchell (The Young and the Restless) - 1990–1991, 1994, 2008–2017, 2019–present (currently played by Elizabeth Hendrickson)
- Rick Forrester (The Bold and the Beautiful) - 1990–2006, 2007–present (currently played by Jacob Young)
- Michael Baldwin (The Young and the Restless) - 1991–1993, 1997–present (played by Christian LeBlanc)
- Nate Hastings (The Young and the Restless) - 1992–2002, 2011, 2019–present (currently played by Sean Dominic)
- Billy Abbott (The Young and the Restless) - 1993–2003, 2006, 2008–present (currently played by Jason Thompson)
- Sharon Newman (The Young and the Restless) - 1994–present (currently played by Sharon Case)
- Phyllis Summers (The Young and the Restless) - 1994–1997, 1997-1999, 2000–2013, 2014–present (currently played by Michelle Stafford)
- Adam Newman (The Young and the Restless) - 1995–1997, 2002, 2008–2016, 2019–present (currently played by Mark Grossman)
- Lily Winters (The Young and the Restless) - 1995–1998, 2002–present (currently played by Christel Khalil)
