= Raya Meddine =

Lebanese American actress

- Born: Rana Alamuddin; New York City, United States
- Years active: 2003–present
- Spouse: Elie Karam (m. 2004)
- Children: 2

Rana Alamuddin (Arabic: رنا علم الدين), known professionally as Raya Meddine, is a Lebanese-American actress. She is known for her role as Sabrina Costelana Newman on The Young and the Restless.

== Personal life ==
Born in New York City, Meddine is a Lebanese Druze who has lived in several countries due to her father's work in diplomatic missions. Her father was originally from Mimess, and her mother from Kfeir, both in Hasbaya District.

== Career ==
Meddine studied Media at the Lebanese American University. She initially worked at Orbit TV as a host and reporter. She has later worked in Paris, Beirut and Los Angeles. In February 2008, Meddine joined the cast of the American soap opera The Young and the Restless in the contract role of Sabrina Costelana Newman. A shift in story line killed off the character, and Meddine left the role of Sabrina in August 2008. In June 2009, due to the popularity of the Sabrina character, Meddine signed a deal with The Young & the Restless to appear on a recurring basis as Sabrina's "ghost".

Some of her other acting roles include Isabelle in the Lebanese box office hit Bosta (2006), and as Wanda in the short award-winning film Recycling Flo (2004). She also made a guest appearance as Kayla on the NBC TV series, She Spies alongside Natasha Henstridge in 2003. In 2009, Meddine guest starred on the hit CBS series, CSI: Miami, then appeared in a featured role in the hit summer movie "Sex and the City 2" opposite Sarah Jessica Parker in 2010.

In January 2012, Meddine appeared on the pilot episode of the FOX television series, Touch, starring Kiefer Sutherland. In 2018, she started to host a program titled "Bayneh W Baynek", with Nadine Labaki as the first guest, in which she discussed women issues.

== Social awareness ==
Meddine is cultural ambassador for the Levantine Cultural Center in Los Angeles.

== Personal life ==
Meddine married Lebanese-Canadian director/writer Elie Karam in a civil marriage in Cyprus in 2004, they have two kids together.

== Filmography ==
Film

- 2004: Baby's Momma Drama
- 2004: Recycling Flo as Wanda
- 2005: Bosta as Isabelle
- 2010: Sex and the City 2 as Annesha
- 2017: Wajib
- 2017: Bonbone
- 2019: Beirut Hold'em as Carole

TV series

- 2003: She Spies as Kayla (1 episode)
- 2008: The Young and the Restless as Sabrina Costelana Newman (Role: February 28-August 4, 2008, September 24, 2008, June 2, 2009 to June 5, 2009, December 23, 2010
- 2008: CSI: Miami as Kate Hawkes (1 episode)
- 2010: Rizzoli & Isles as Claire (1 episode)
- 2012: Touch as Mrs. Kosta

Video games

- 2012: Diablo III
- 2014: Diablo III: Reaper of Souls
