= Mark Grossman =

American actor

Mark Grossman (born February 3, 1987) is an American actor. He is best known for his role as Adam Newman in the television series The Young and the Restless which he has been playing since 2019. In 2020, he was nominated for a Daytime Emmy Award for Outstanding Supporting Actor in a Drama Series.
