= Chris Engen (actor) =

American actor

Chris Engen (born October 25, 1979) is an American former actor best known for his portrayal of Adam Newman on the daytime soap opera The Young and the Restless.

== Personal life ==
Born in Apple Valley, California, Engen is also a writer and a musician. He graduated from Bishop Montgomery High School in 1997.

== Career ==
Engen has guest-starred in various television programs. He was a recurring character in Saints & Sinners, CSI: NY and Felicity. He began appearing as Adam Newman on The Young and the Restless on February 12, 2008.

Engen abruptly left his role on The Young and the Restless in mid-May 2009; the role was immediately recast with actor Michael Muhney. Engen's departure was allegedly due to "the dark direction his character [was] taking" and an upcoming same-sex storyline. It was alleged that Engen abruptly left the show "mid-contract due to objections over Adam's storyline and character direction," but the precise objections have never been established beyond the realm of unsubstantiated rumors. In a subsequent statement on the subject, Engen stated, among other things, "I felt generally unhappy about my contribution to the show, and had greater and greater difficulty making any sense of the challenges they were asking me to face. I know a great many of you have endured far worse than what you perceive to have been my circumstance, but I do not believe that just because you have suffered a particular injustice, so too must everyone else in order to understand that injustice. I want to apologize to any of my fellow actors who I may have disappointed." Addressing reports of homophobia, he stated, in part:

I would also like to apologize to those of you who feel slighted by this choice, as I have been branded a "homophobe" by several members of the press. This is, of course, absurd and many of my dearest friends are homosexuals who would be more than happy to speak on my behalf. My decision had nothing to do with religion, or anything I learned at Bishop Montgomery High School. Bishop is a great institution of learning that encourages tolerance and acceptance of others. I do not ascribe to any one religious ideology but do value the truth that exists in them all. I think the unfortunate assumption that has been made is that Catholics are intolerant of homosexuals on the basis of their Catholicism. Intolerance of anything is a product of one's underlying belief system as an experience of limitation. It is the line we intellectually draw within ourselves that prevents us from understanding those things we reject, because it defines the boundaries of who we are as individuals. We are what we are, but we are also NOT what we are not. Intolerance is a natural reaction that, I believe, we must understand in order to defeat. It is not a fire to be stomped out by an angry foot or extinguished by an inundating stream of media exposure. Homosexuality is a quality of beingness: one of many qualities that make up the rich diversity that humanity expresses.

== Filmography ==
=== Film ===
Year	Title	Role	Notes
2004	Dirty Dancing: Havana Nights	Steph	
2006	Sasquatch Mountain	Chris Logan	
2006	Left In Darkness	Doug	Direct to Video
2007	God's Ears	The Bar Fly	
2012	Easy Rider: The Ride Back	Virgil William	
2012	Raincheck Romance	Nathan	Short

=== Television ===
Year	Title	Role	Notes
2000	Felicity	Finn	4 Episode Guest Star
2001	Popular	Jared	Guest Star
2001	Go Fish	Tommy Simpson	Guest Star
2002	As If	Rob	7 Episode Guest Star
2006	CSI: NY	John Hayes	Guest Star
2007	Saints & Sinners	Richard Vargas	Recurring Character
2008–2009	The Young and the Restless	Adam Wilson	Role held: February 12, 2008 – June 24, 2009
