= Daytime Emmy Award for Outstanding Supporting Actress in a Drama Series =

Daytime Emmy Award

- Awarded for: Outstanding Supporting Performance in a Drama Series: Actress
- Country: United States
- Presented by: NATAS; ATAS
- First award: 1979
- Currently held by: Beth Maitland, The Young and the Restless, (2026)

Highlights
- Most awards: Two (2) wins each: Julia Barr; Tamara Braun; Nancy Lee Grahn; Amelia Heinle; Beth Maitland; Gina Tognoni
- Most nominations: Linsey Godfrey, (6)
- Website: theemmys.tv/daytime

The Daytime Emmy Award for Outstanding Supporting Actress in a Drama Series is an award presented annually by the National Academy of Television Arts and Sciences (NATAS) and Academy of Television Arts & Sciences (ATAS). It is given to honor an actress who has delivered an outstanding performance in a supporting role while working within the daytime drama industry.

At the 6th Daytime Emmy Awards held in 1979, Suzanne Rogers was the first winner of this award, for her role as Maggie Horton on Days of Our Lives. The awards ceremony was not aired on television in 1983 and 1984, having been criticized for voting integrity. Following the introduction of a new category in 1985, Outstanding Younger Actress in a Drama Series, one criterion for this category was altered, requiring all actresses to be aged 26 or above.

Since its inception, the award has been given to 43 actresses. General Hospital is the soap opera with the most awarded actresses, with a total of nine. In 1989, Nancy Lee Grahn and Debbi Morgan made Daytime Emmy Award history when they tied in this category. Morgan also became the first African-American woman to have garnered the award. Julia Barr, Tamara Braun, Grahn, Amelia Heinle, Beth Maitland and Gina Tognoni are the only actresses to have won the award twice. Heinle is the only one to have won it, consecutively. Linsey Godfrey has the most nominations in this category, with a total of six. Following Sonya Eddy's passing in December 2022, she became the first posthumous winner in the category when she received the award in 2023. As of the 2026 ceremony, Maitland is the most recent winner in this category for her role as Traci Abbott on The Young and the Restless.

== Winners and nominees ==
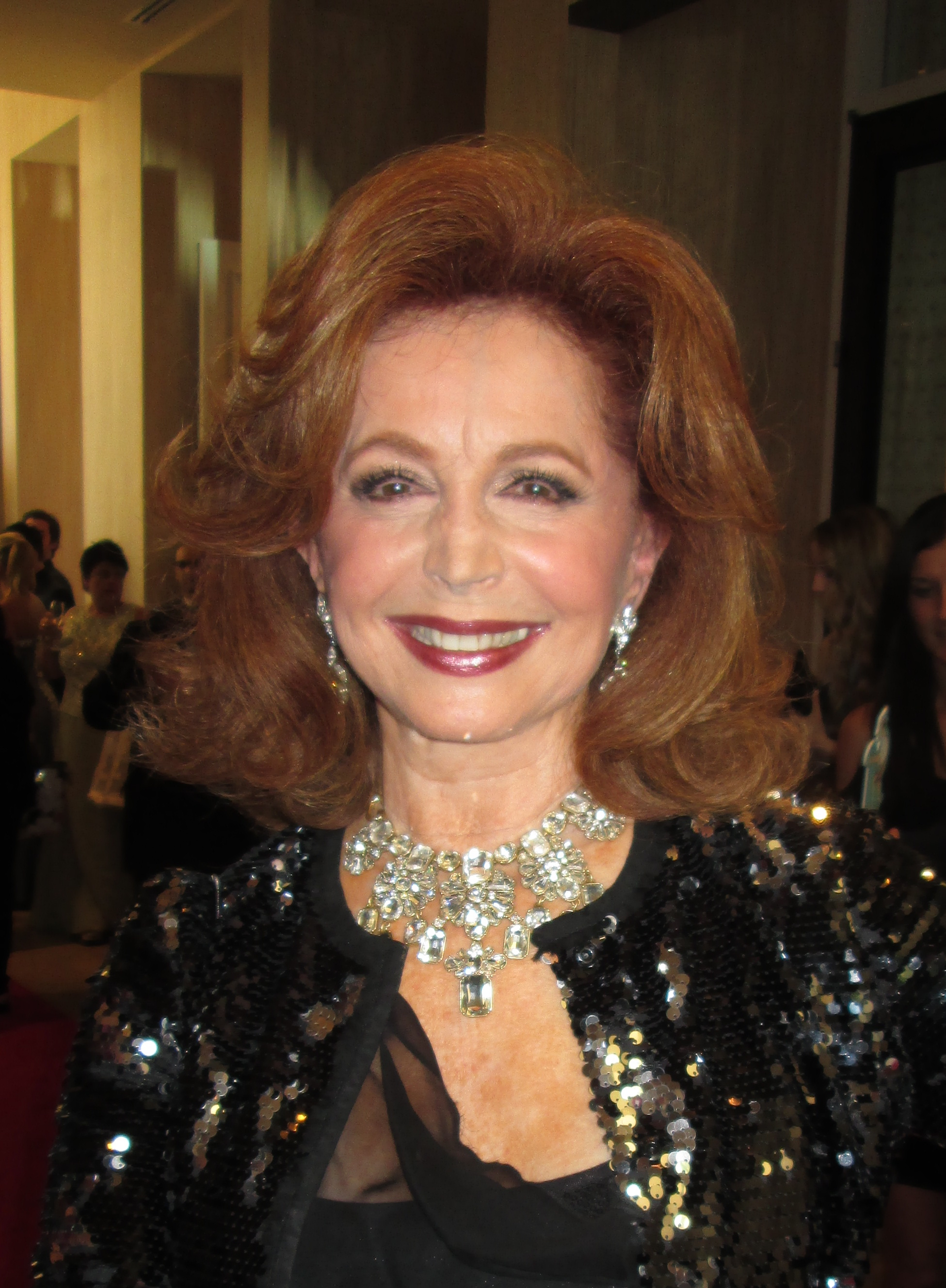
Suzanne Rogers was the first winner, for her role as Maggie Horton on Days of Our Lives.

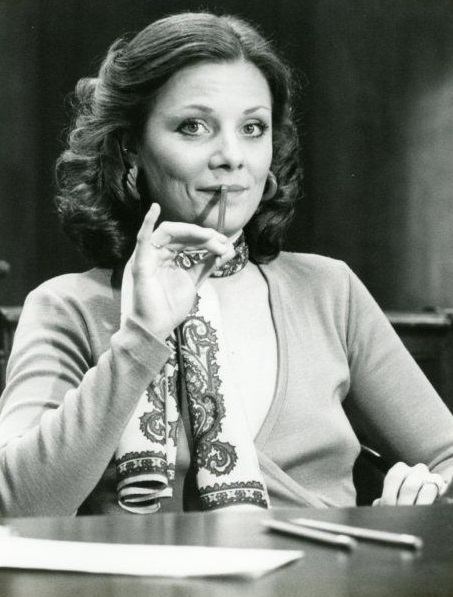
Jane Elliot won in 1981, and was nominated three times, for her work on General Hospital. She was also nominated in 1989 for her work on Days of Our Lives.

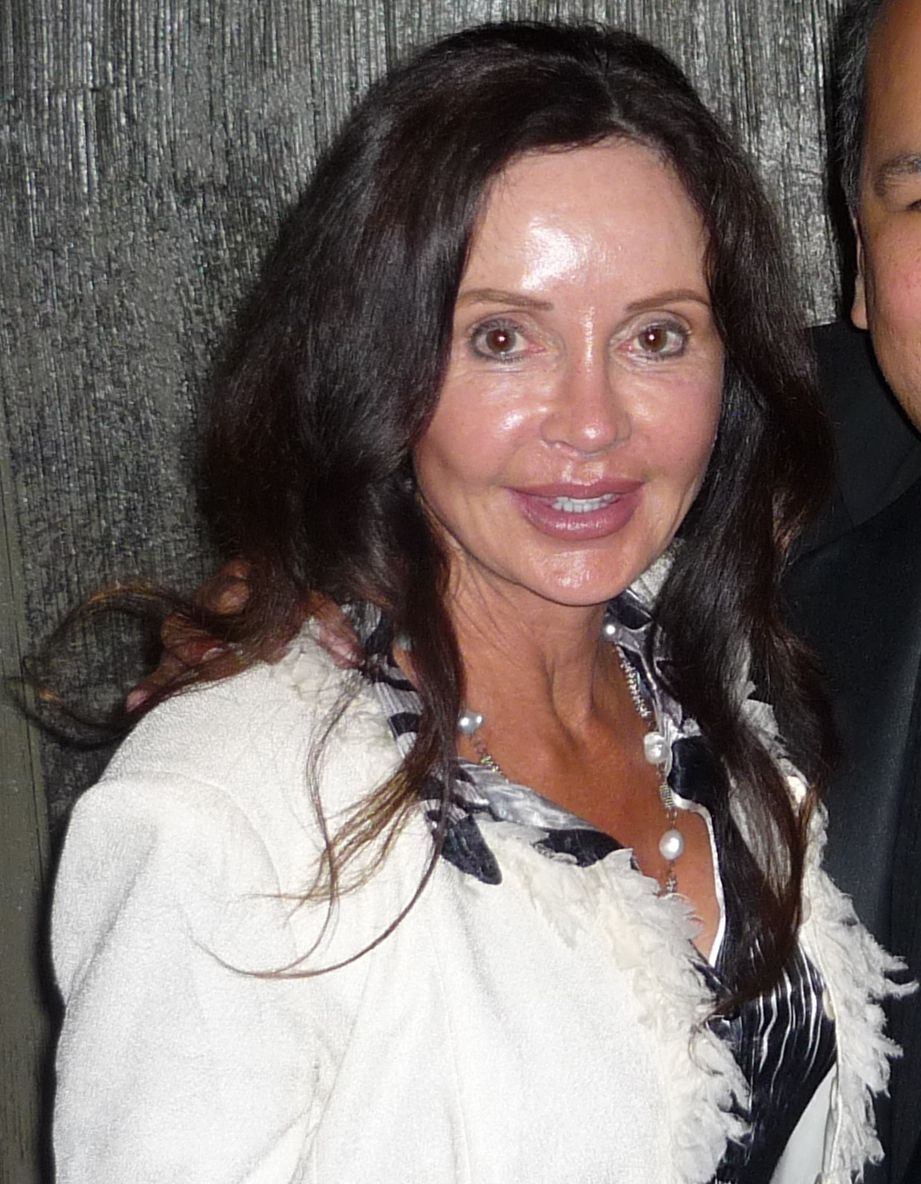
Jacklyn Zeman was nominated three times for her role as Bobbie Spencer on General Hospital.

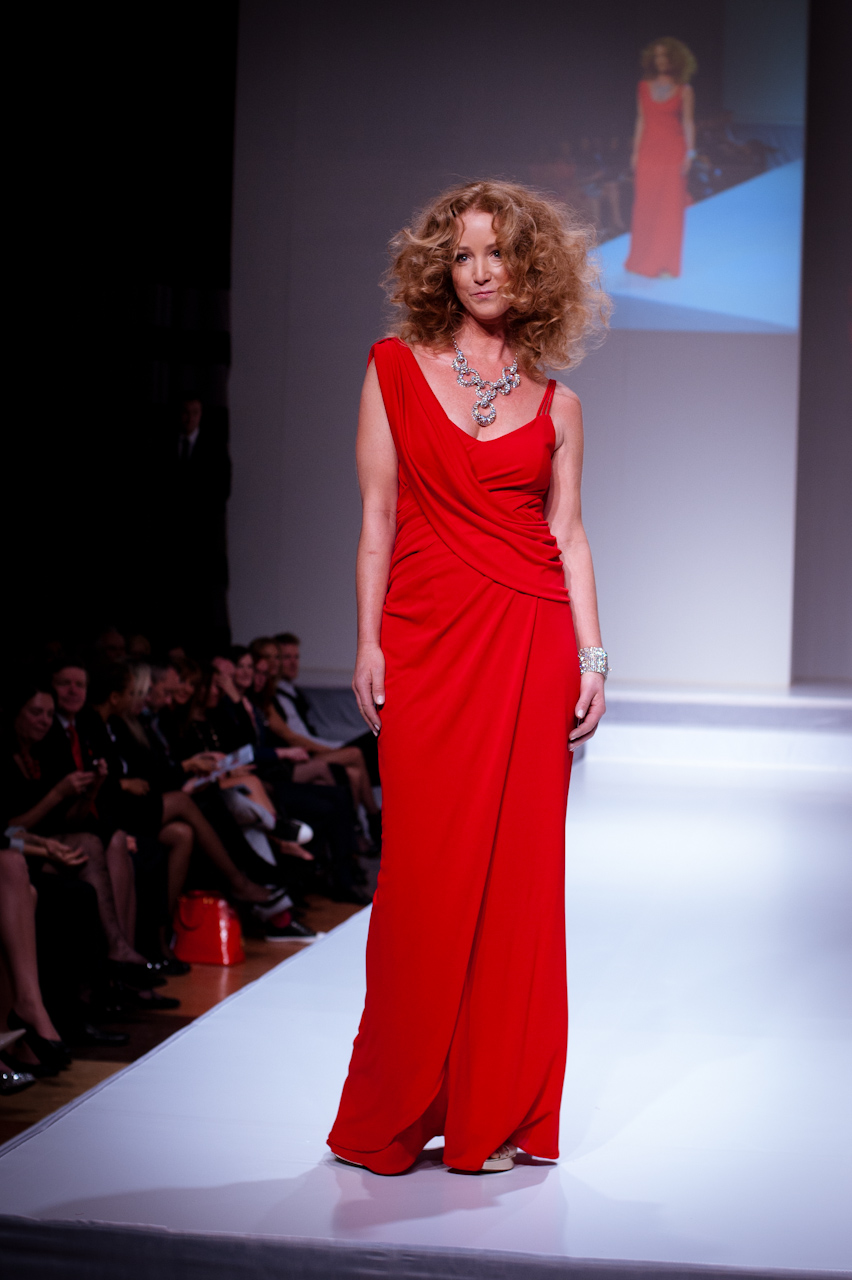
Susan Haskell won in 1994 for her role as Marty Saybrooke on One Life to Live.

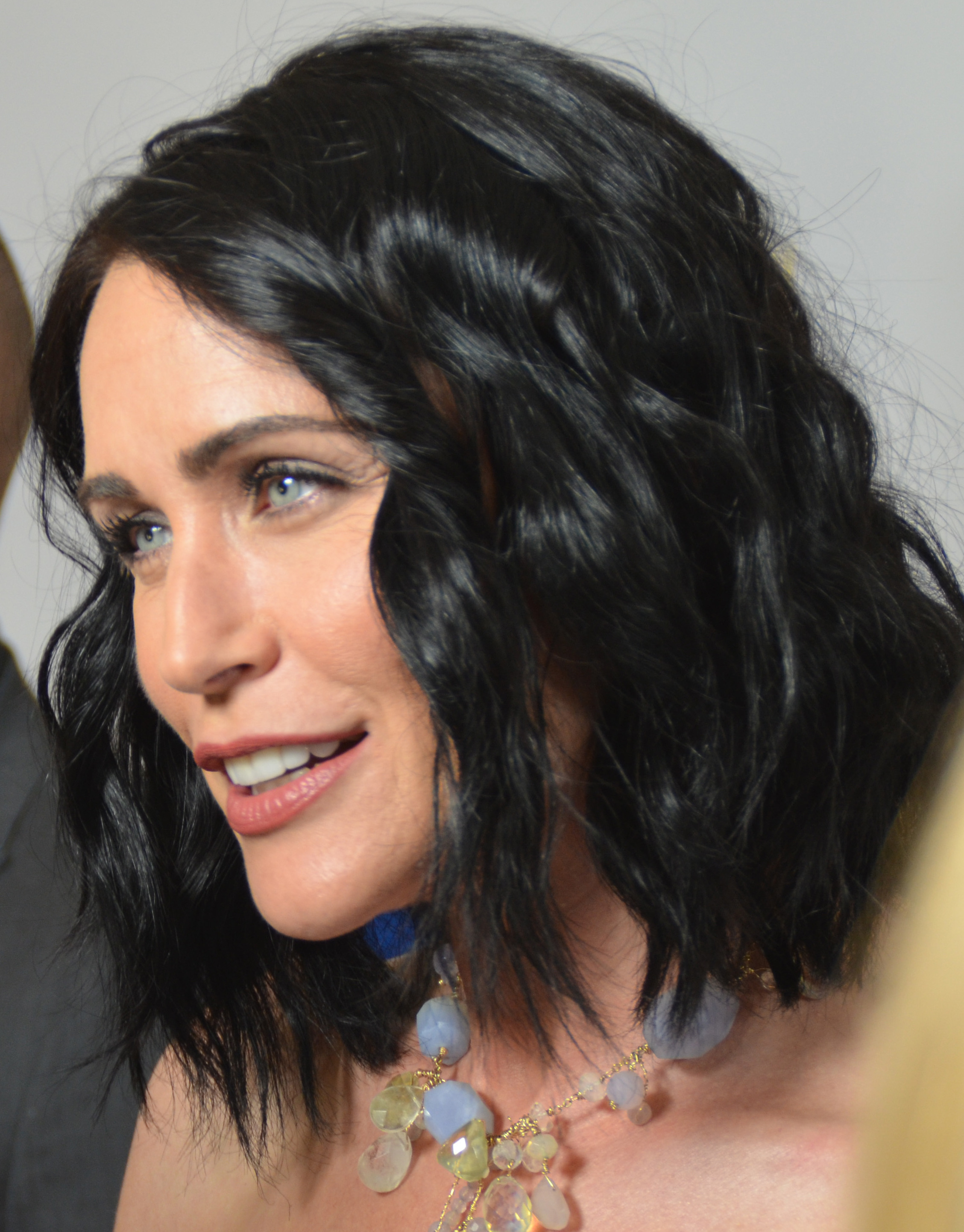
Rena Sofer won in 1995 for her role as Lois Cerullo on General Hospital.

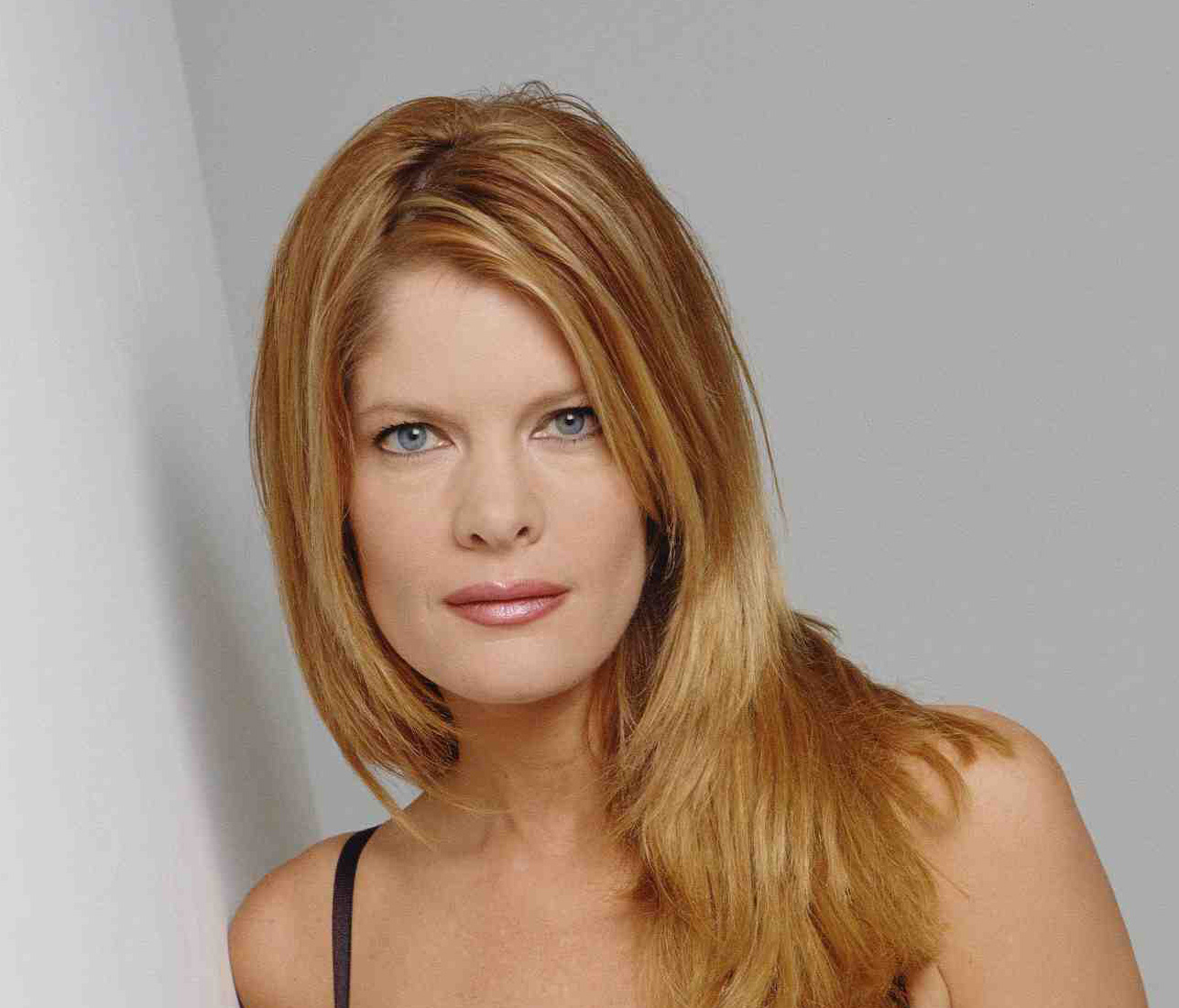
Michelle Stafford was nominated once, before winning in 1997, for her role as Phyllis Summers on The Young and the Restless.

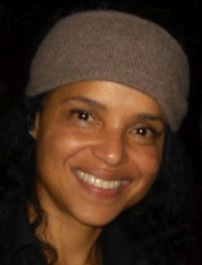
Victoria Rowell was nominated three times for her role as Drucilla Winters on The Young and the Restless.

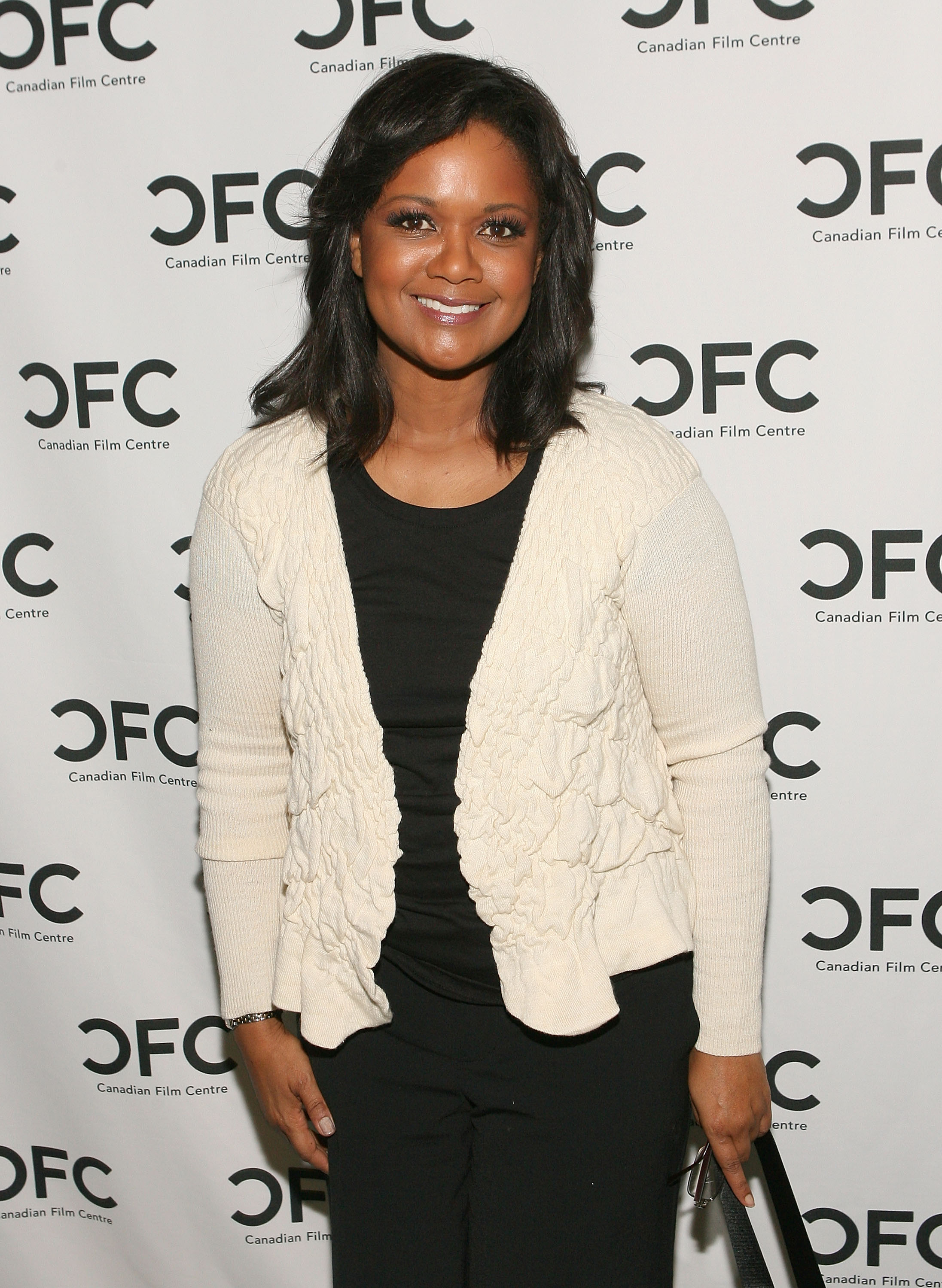
Tonya Lee Williams was nominated twice for her role as Olivia Barber Winters on The Young and the Restless.

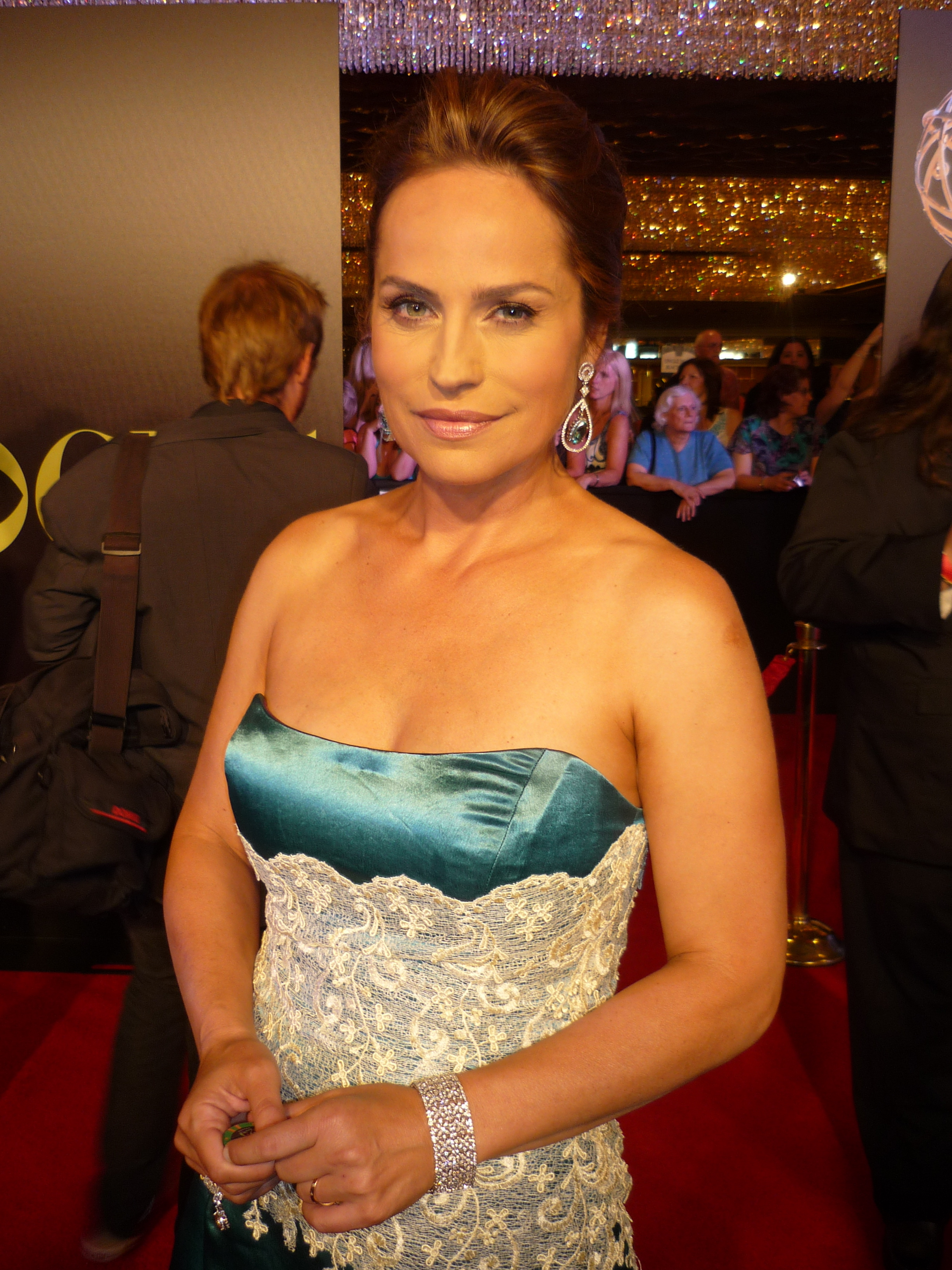
Crystal Chappell won in 2002 for her role as Olivia Spencer on Guiding Light.

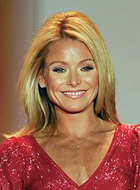
Kelly Ripa was nominated twice for her role as Hayley Vaughan on All My Children.

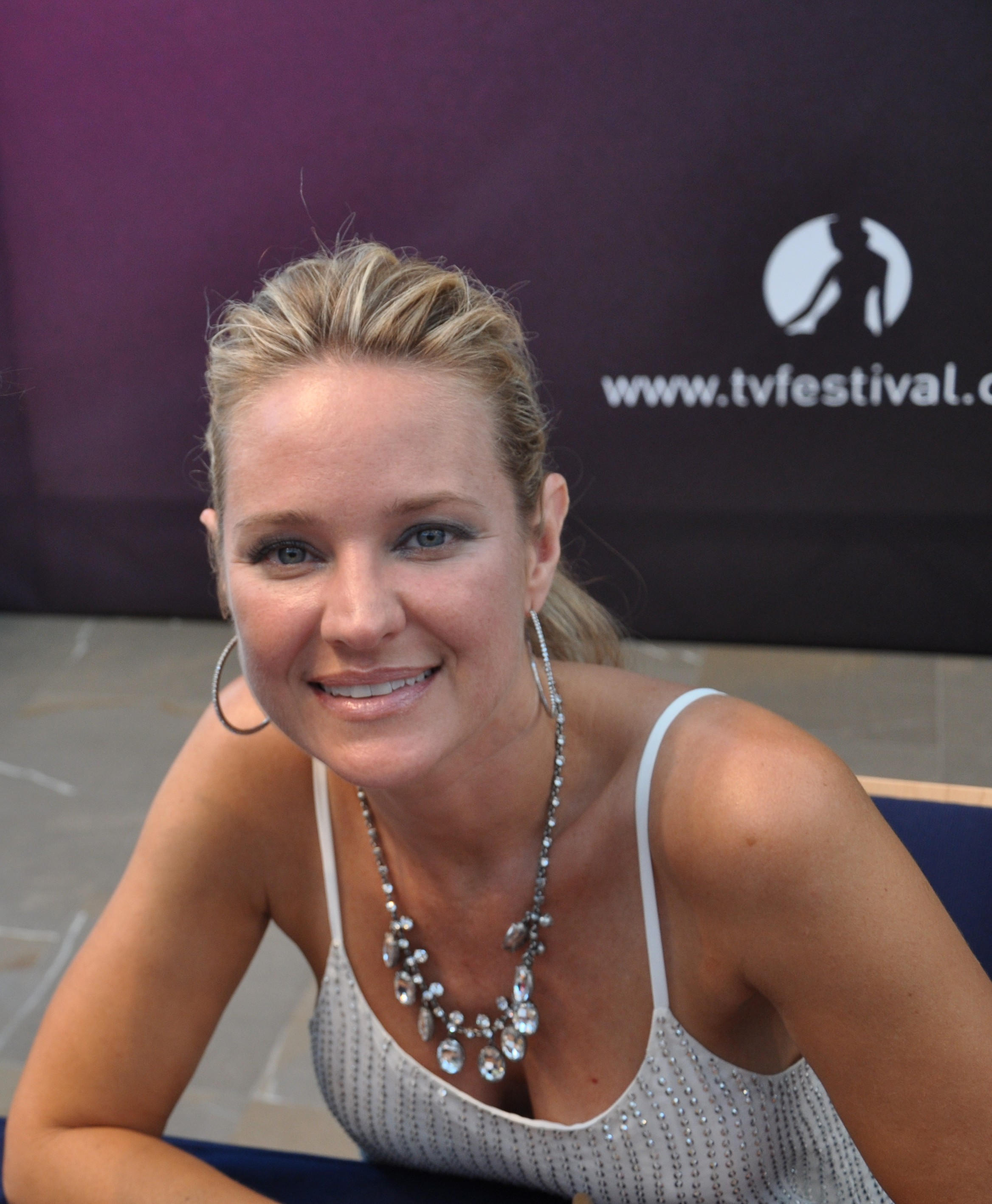
Sharon Case won in 1999 for her role as Sharon Newman on The Young and the Restless, having been nominated on two other occasions.

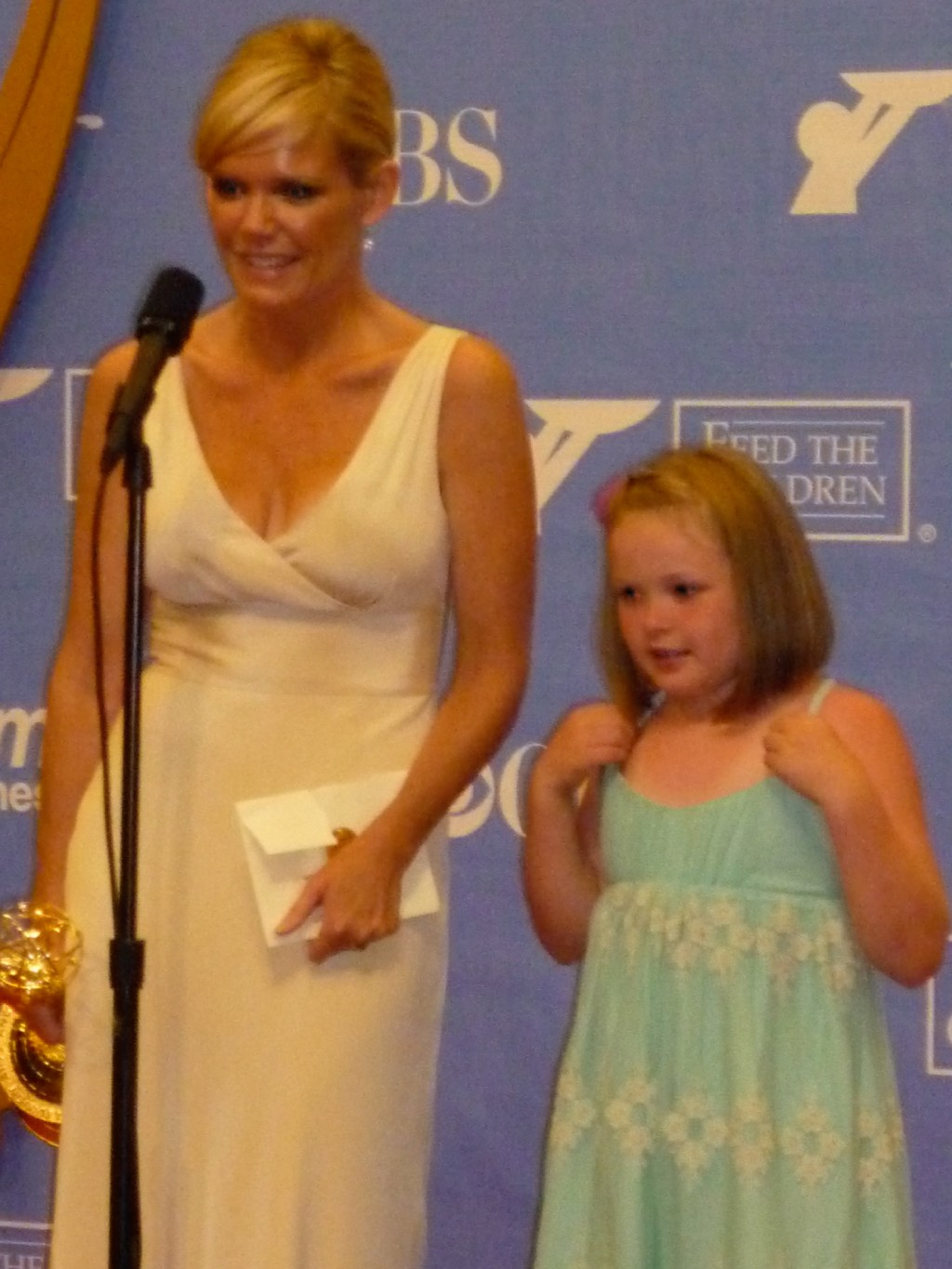
Maura West (left) was nominated twice for her role as Carly Tenney on As the World Turns.

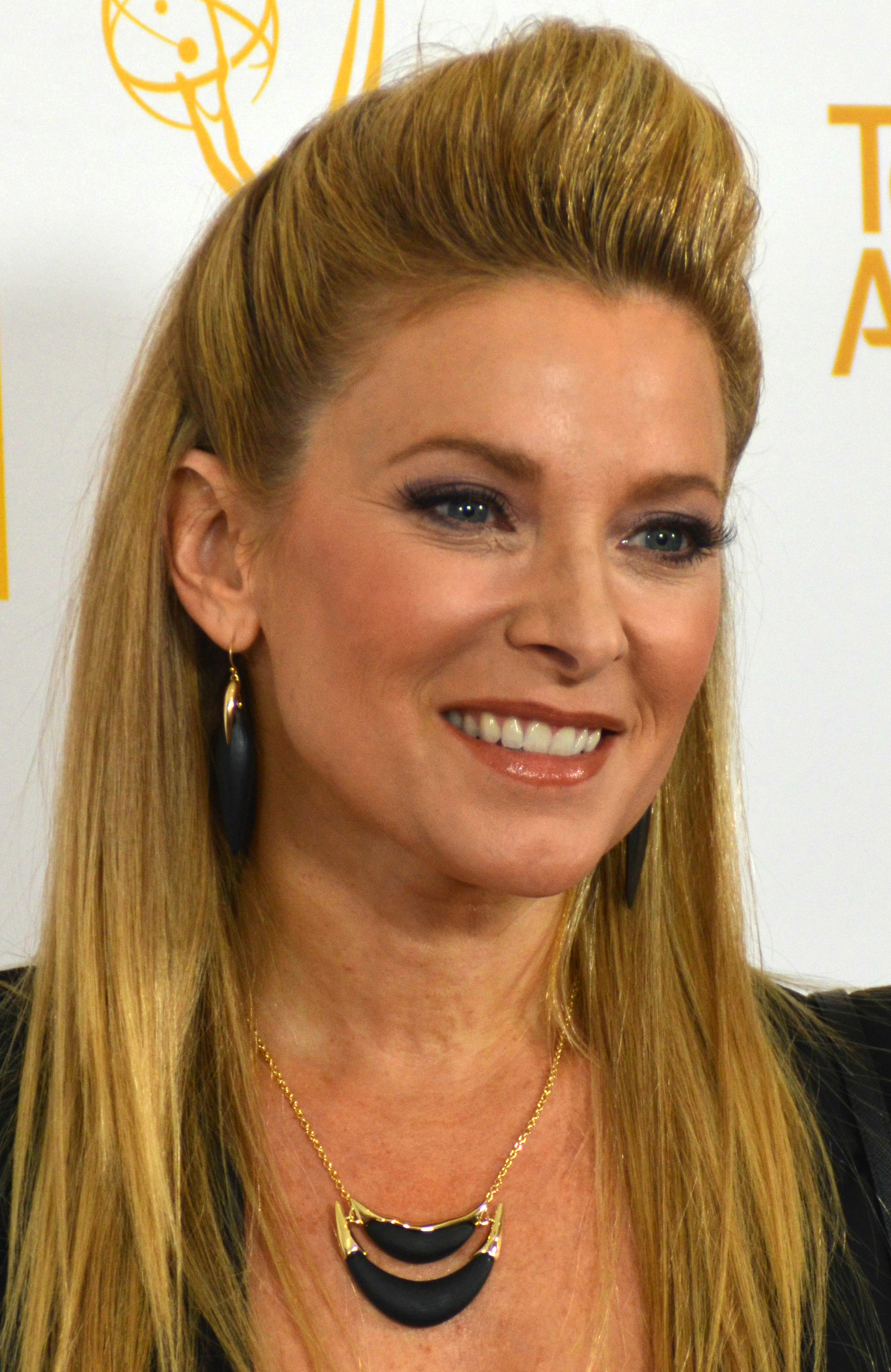
Cady McClain was nominated once for he work All My Children, before winning in 2004 for her role as Rosanna Cabot on As the World Turns.

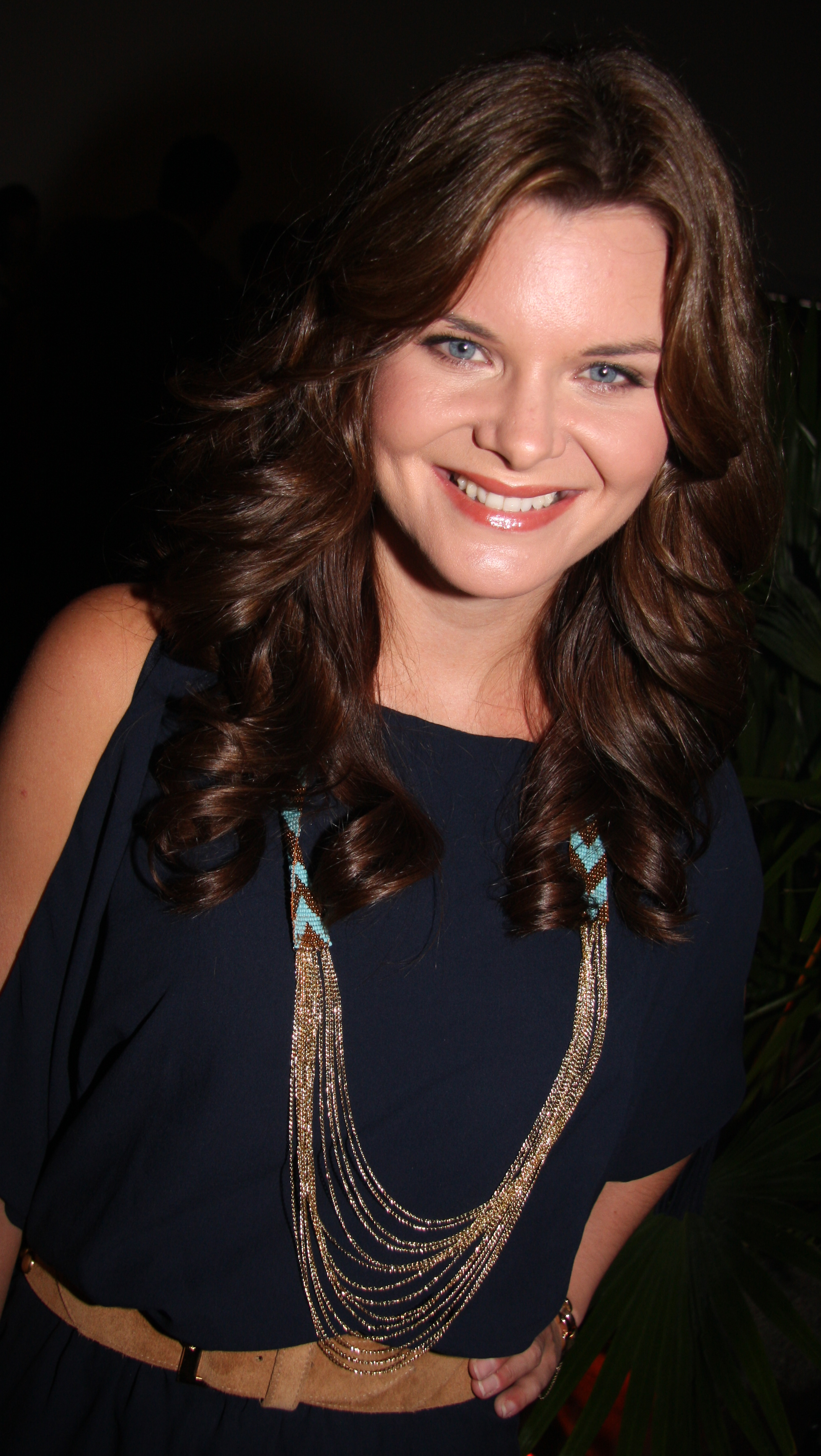
Heather Tom was nominated for her roles on The Young and the Restless and One Life to Live, before receiving a nomination in 2008 and winning in 2011 for her role as Katie Logan Spencer on The Bold and the Beautiful.

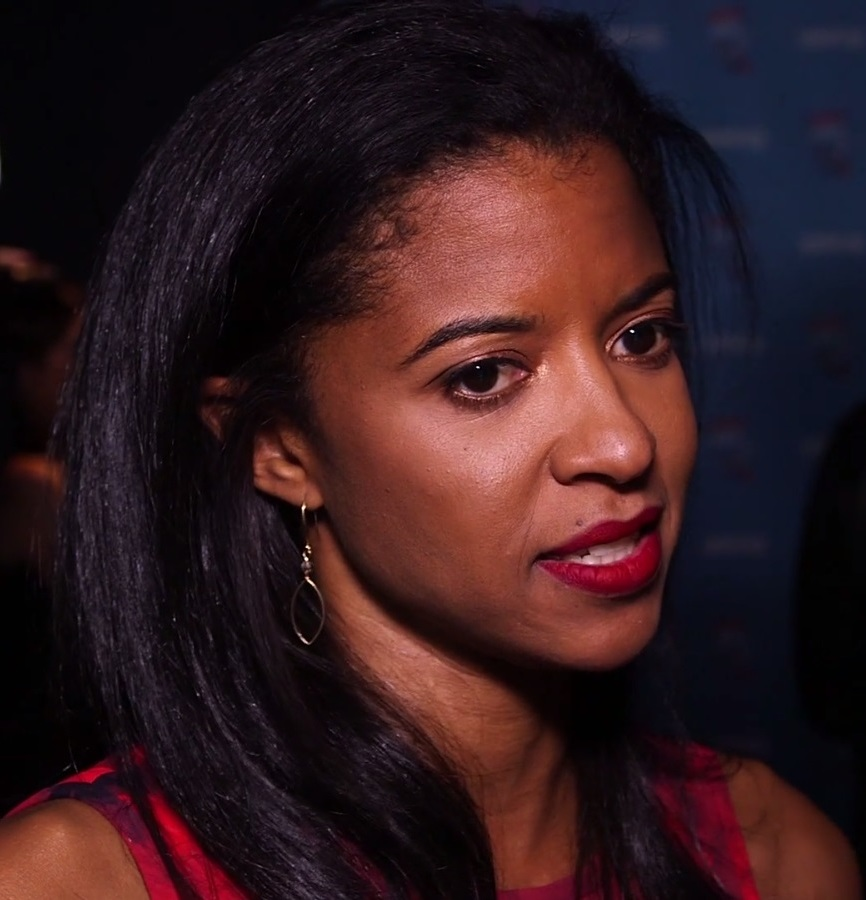
Renée Elise Goldsberry was nominated twice for her role as Evangeline Williamson on One Life to Live.

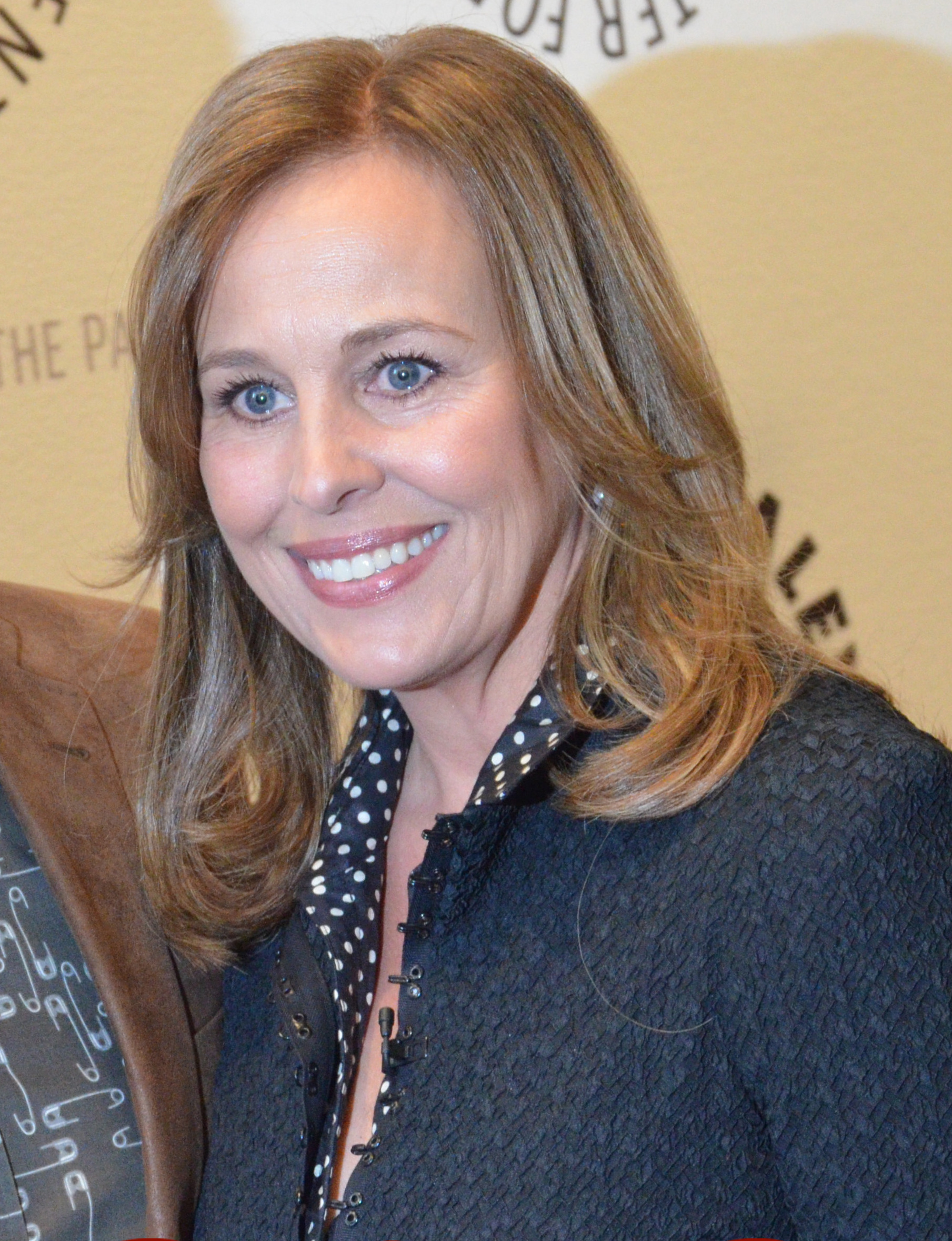
Genie Francis won in 2007 for her role as Laura Spencer on General Hospital. She was nominated once more, in 2012, for her role as Genevieve Atkinson on The Young and the Restless.

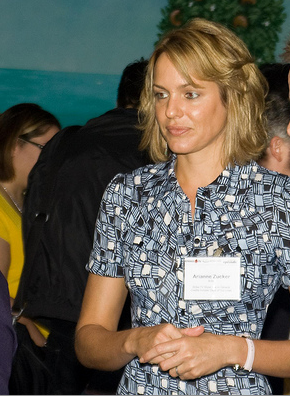
Arianne Zucker was nominated twice for her role as Nicole Walker on Days of Our Lives.

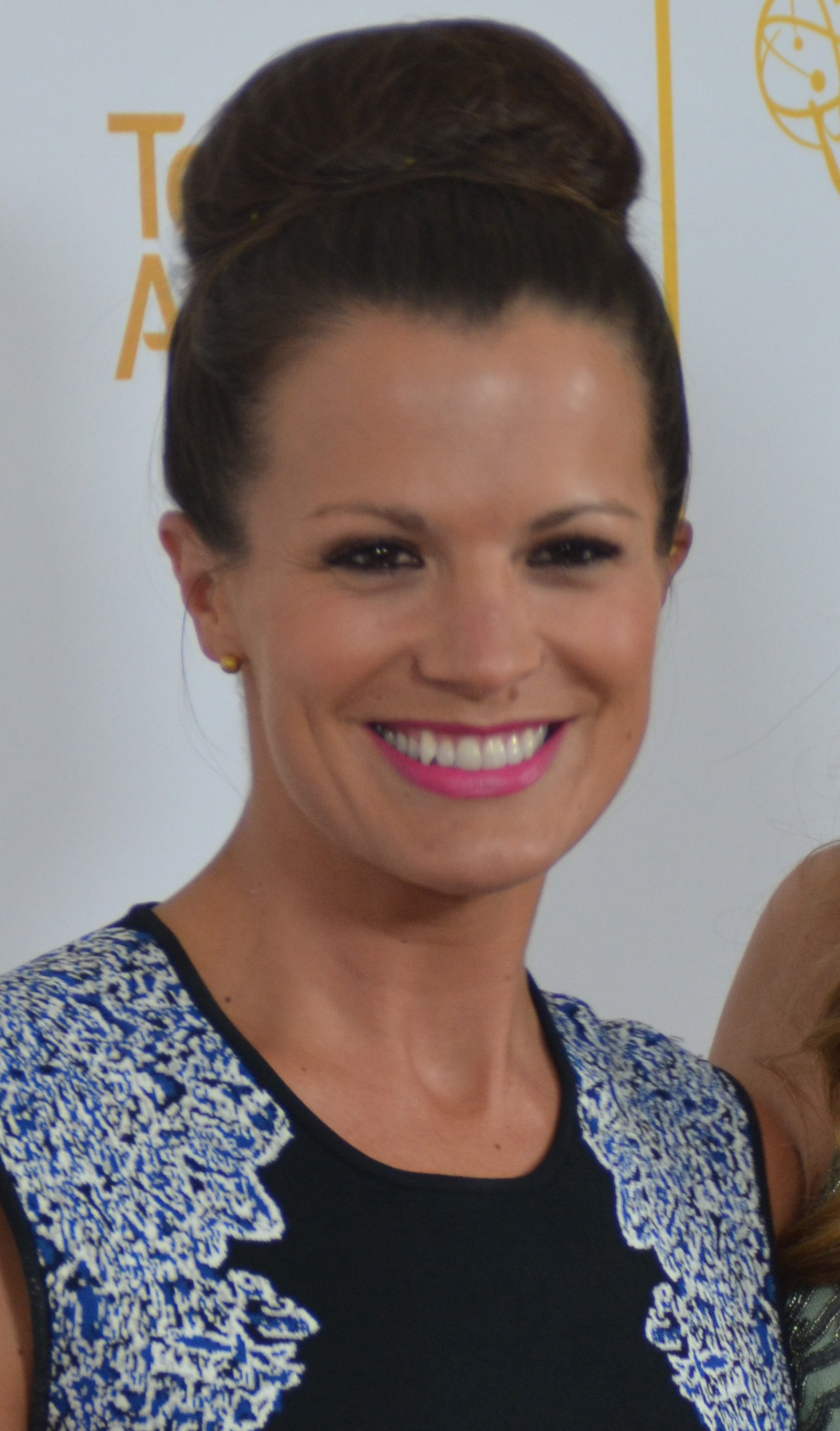
Melissa Claire Egan was nominated three times for her role as Annie Lavery on All My Children and twice for her role as Chelsea Newman on The Young and the Restless

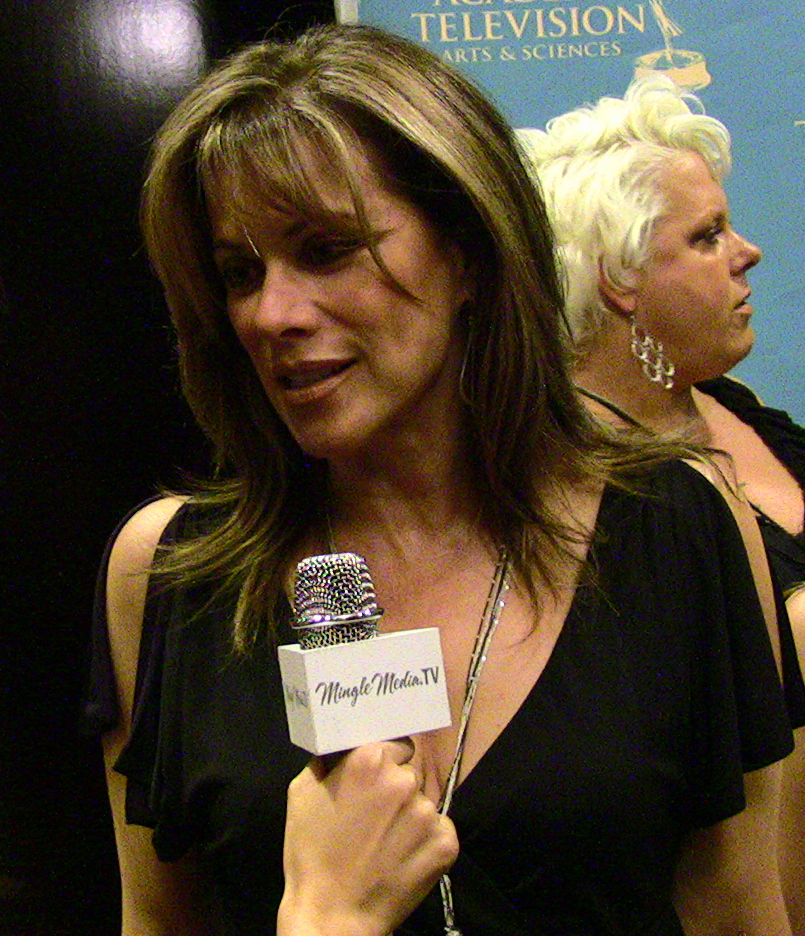
Nancy Lee Grahn won in 1989 for her role as Julia Wainwright Capwell on Santa Barbara. She was later nominated twice more, in 2000 and 2011, later winning in 2012 for her role as Alexis Davis on General Hospital.

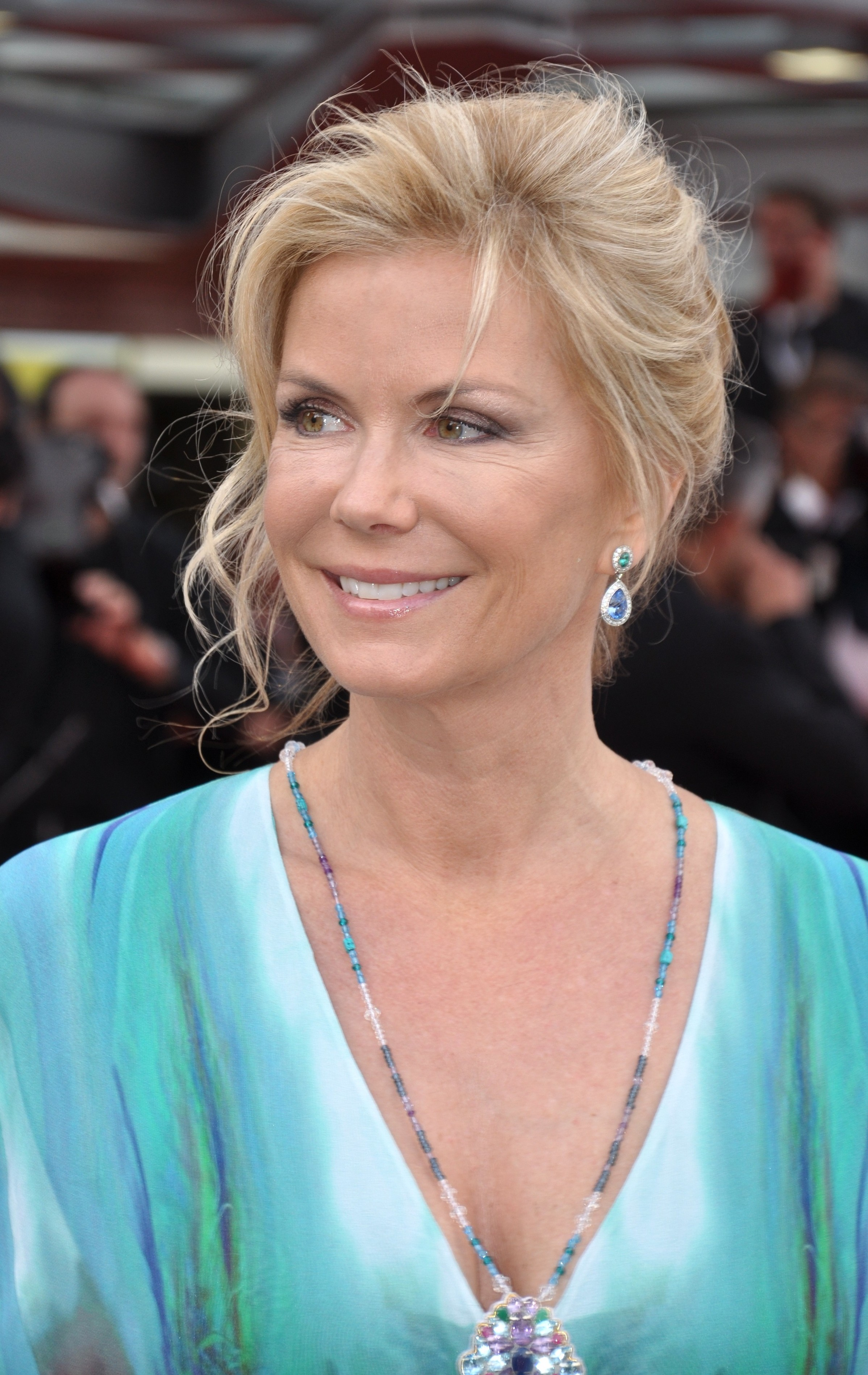
After 26 years on the series, Katherine Kelly Lang was nominated in 2013 for her role as Brooke Logan on The Bold and the Beautiful.

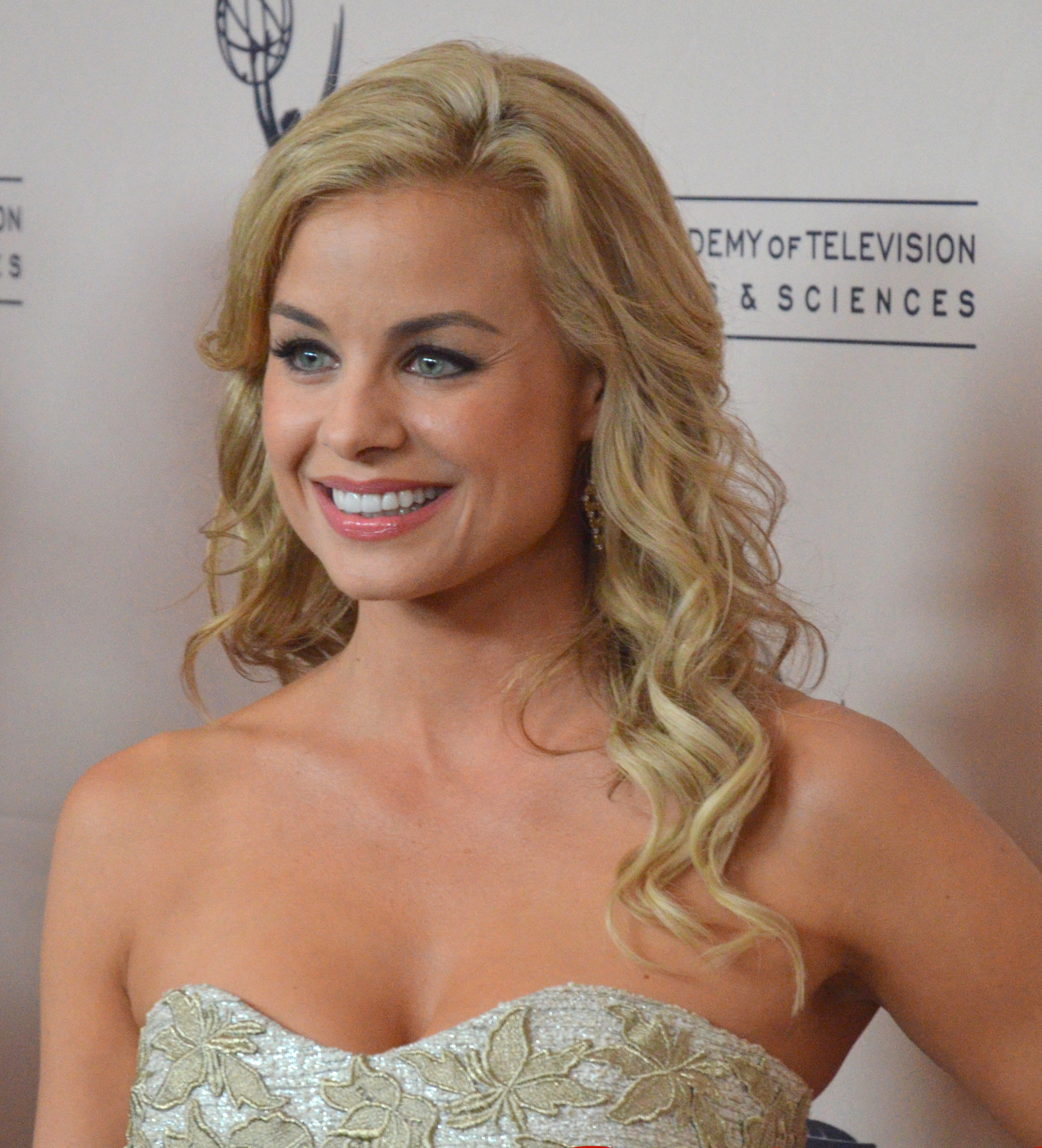
Jessica Collins was nominated in 2013, and won in 2016, for her role as Avery Bailey Clark on The Young and the Restless.

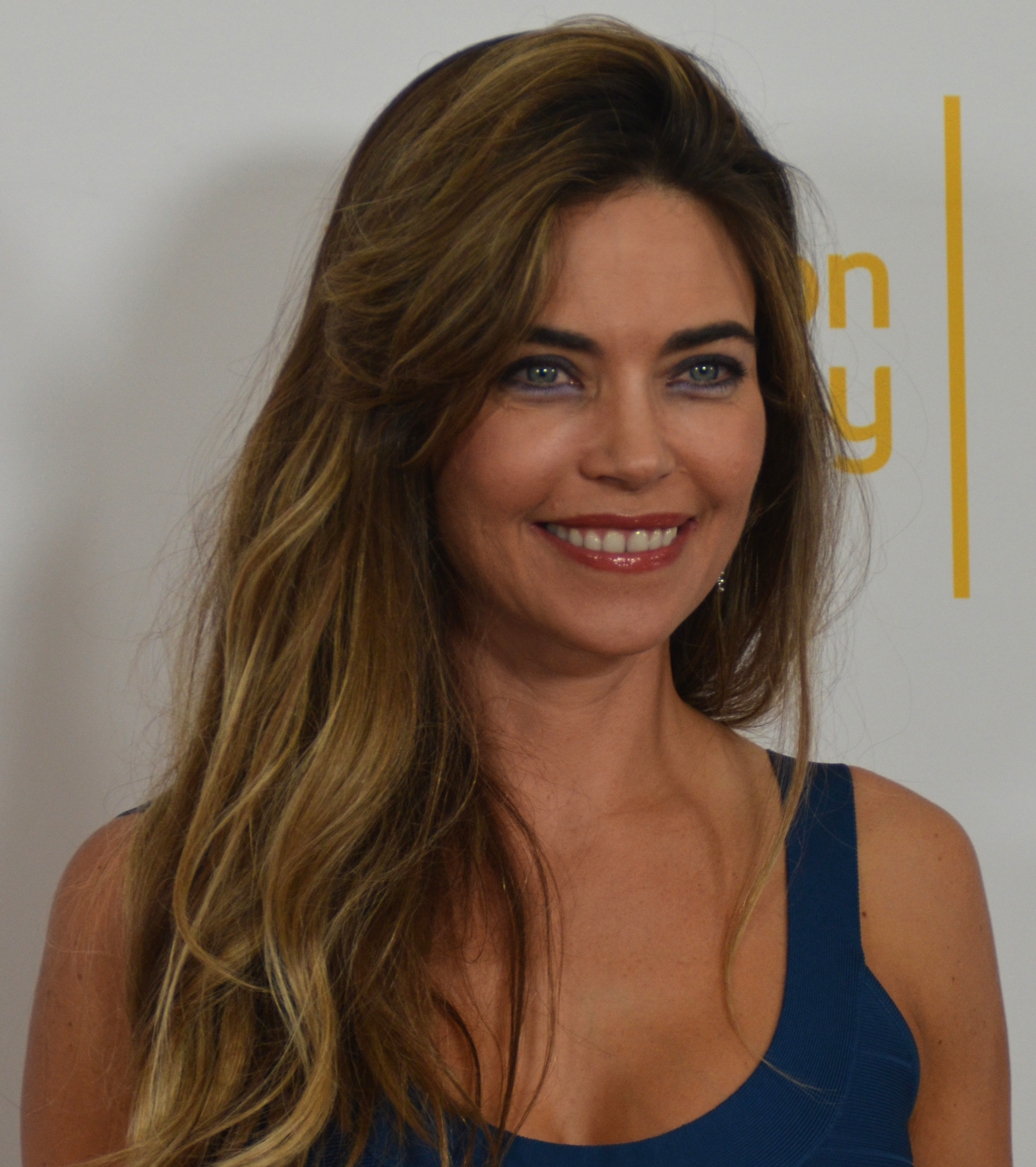
Amelia Heinle won in 2014 and 2015 for her role as Victoria Newman on The Young and the Restless

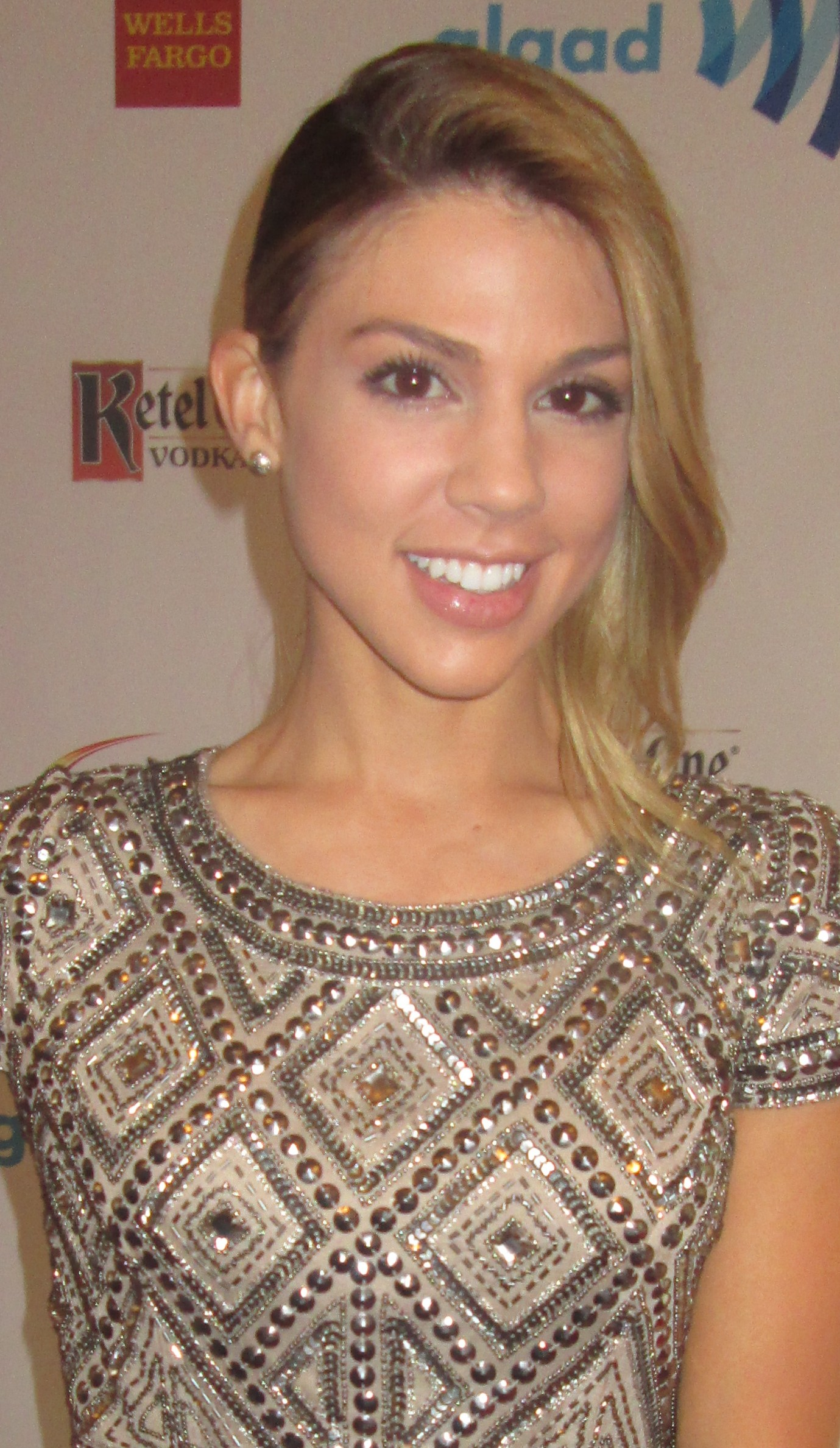
Kate Mansi won in 2017 for her role as Abigail Deveraux on Days of Our Lives.

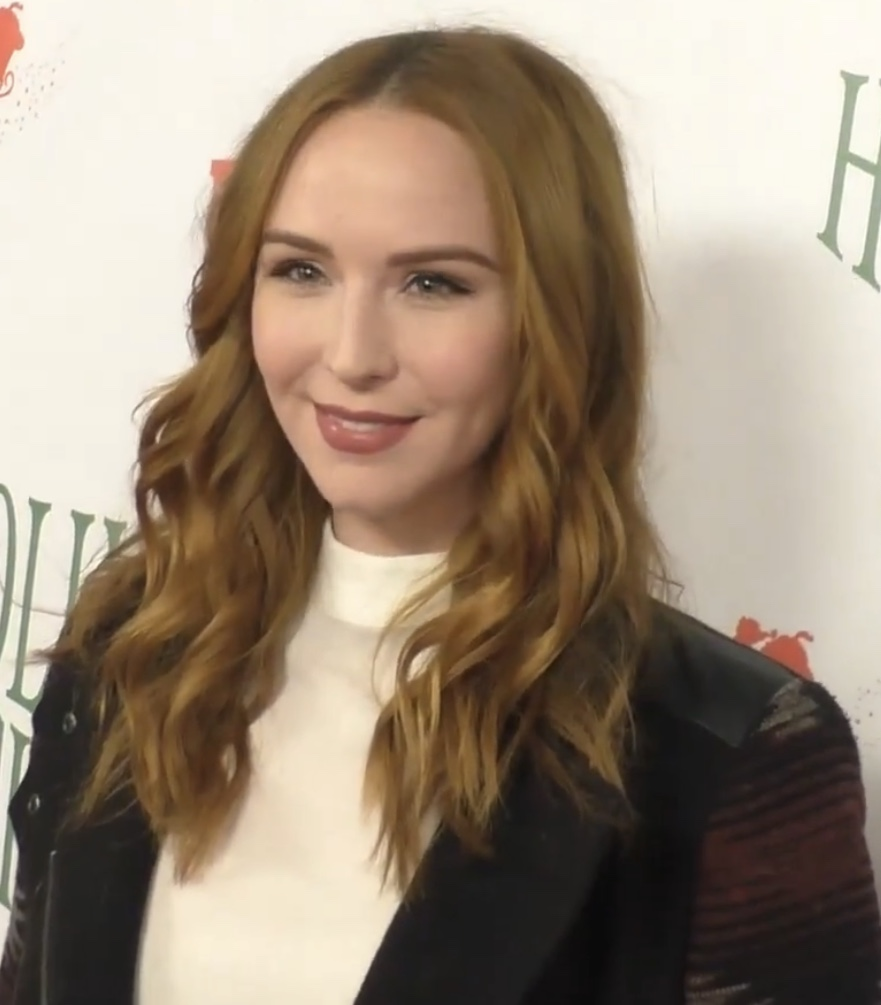
Camryn Grimes received two nominations, winning in 2018 for her role as Mariah Copeland on The Young and the Restless

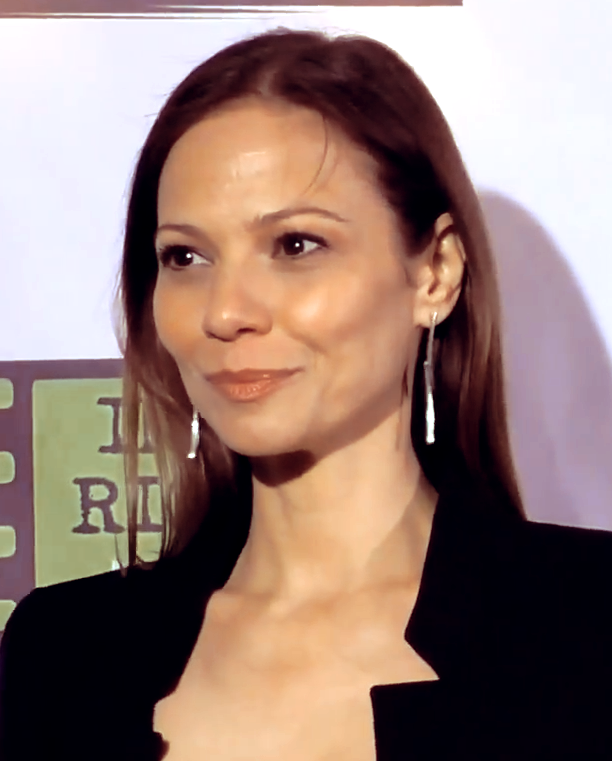
Tamara Braun won the award twice: first in 2009, for her role as Ava Vitali on Days of Our Lives; and in 2020, for her role as Dr. Kim Nero on General Hospital.

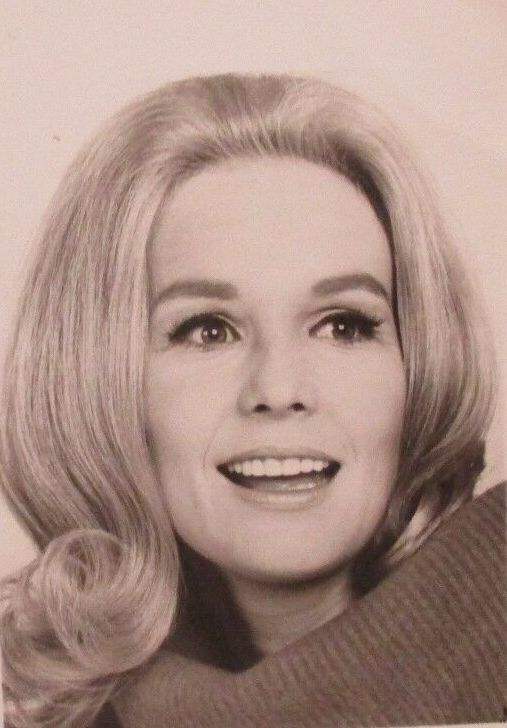
Marla Adams won in 2021 (receiving a previous nomination in 2018) for her role as Dina Mergeron for on The Young and the Restless.

Listed below are the winners of the award for each year, as well as the other nominees.

Table key
‡	Indicates the winner
†	Indicates a posthumous winner
*	Indicates a posthumous nominee

=== 1970s ===
Year	Actress	Program	Role	Network	Ref.
1979 (6th)
1979 (6th)	Suzanne Rogers ‡	Days of Our Lives	Maggie Horton	NBC	
1979 (6th)	Rachel Ames	General Hospital	Audrey March Hardy	ABC	
1979 (6th)	Susan Brown	General Hospital	Gail Adamson Baldwin	ABC	
1979 (6th)	Lois Kibbee	The Edge of Night	Geraldine Whitney Saxon	ABC	
1979 (6th)	Frances Reid	Days of Our Lives	Alice Horton	NBC	

=== 1980s ===
Year	Actress	Program	Role	Network	Ref.
1980 (7th)
1980 (7th)	Francesca James ‡	All My Children	Kelly Cole Tyler	ABC	
1980 (7th)	Deidre Hall	Days of Our Lives	Marlena Evans	NBC	
1980 (7th)	Lois Kibbee	The Edge of Night	Geraldine Whitney Saxon	ABC	
1980 (7th)	Elaine Lee	The Doctors	Mildred Trumble	NBC	
1980 (7th)	Valerie Mahaffey	The Doctors	Ashley Bennett	NBC	
1981 (8th)
1981 (8th)	Jane Elliot ‡	General Hospital	Tracy Quartermaine	ABC	
1981 (8th)	Randall Edwards	Ryan's Hope	Delia Coleridge	ABC	
1981 (8th)	Lois Kibbee	The Edge of Night	Geraldine Saxon	ABC	
1981 (8th)	Elizabeth Lawrence	All My Children	Myra Murdoch	ABC	
1981 (8th)	Jacklyn Zeman	General Hospital	Bobbie Spencer	ABC	
1982 (9th)
1982 (9th)	Dorothy Lyman ‡	All My Children	Opal Gardner	ABC	
1982 (9th)	Elizabeth Lawrence	All My Children	Myra Murdoch	ABC	
1982 (9th)	Meg Mundy	The Doctors	Mona Aldrich Croft	NBC	
1982 (9th)	Louise Shaffer	Ryan's Hope	Rae Woodard	ABC	
1983 (10th)
1983 (10th)	Louise Shaffer ‡	Ryan's Hope	Rae Woodard	ABC	
1983 (10th)	Kim Delaney	All My Children	Jenny Gardner	ABC	
1983 (10th)	Eileen Herlie	All My Children	Myrtle Fargate	ABC	
1983 (10th)	Robin Mattson	General Hospital	Heather Webber	ABC	
1983 (10th)	Brynn Thayer	One Life to Live	Jenny Wolek	ABC	
1983 (10th)	Marcy Walker	All My Children	Liza Colby	ABC	
1984 (11th)
1984 (11th)	Judi Evans ‡	Guiding Light	Beth Raines	CBS	
1984 (11th)	Loanne Bishop	General Hospital	Rose Kelly	ABC	
1984 (11th)	Christine Ebersole	One Life to Live	Maxie McDermont	ABC	
1984 (11th)	Eileen Herlie	All My Children	Myrtle Fargate	ABC	
1984 (11th)	Lois Kibbee	The Edge of Night	Geraldine Whitney Saxon	ABC	
1984 (11th)	Marcy Walker	All My Children	Liza Colby	ABC	
1985 (12th)
1985 (12th)	Beth Maitland ‡	The Young and the Restless	Traci Abbott	CBS	
1985 (12th)	Norma Connolly	General Hospital	Ruby Anderson	ABC	
1985 (12th)	Eileen Herlie	All My Children	Myrtle Fargate	ABC	
1985 (12th)	Maeve Kinkead	Guiding Light	Vanessa Chamberlain	CBS	
1985 (12th)	Elizabeth Lawrence	All My Children	Myra Murdoch	ABC	
1986 (13th)
1986 (13th)	Leann Hunley ‡	Days of Our Lives	Anna DiMera	NBC	
1986 (13th)	Judith Anderson	Santa Barbara	Minx Lockridge	NBC	
1986 (13th)	Uta Hagen	One Life to Live	Hortense	ABC	
1986 (13th)	Eileen Herlie	All My Children	Myrtle Fargate	ABC	
1986 (13th)	Kathleen Widdoes	As the World Turns	Emma Snyder	CBS	
1987 (14th)
1987 (14th)	Kathleen Noone ‡	All My Children	Ellen Dalton	ABC	
1987 (14th)	Lisa Brown	As the World Turns	Iva Snyder	CBS	
1987 (14th)	Robin Mattson	Santa Barbara	Gina Blake Lockridge	NBC	
1987 (14th)	Peggy McCay	Days of Our Lives	Caroline Brady	NBC	
1987 (14th)	Kathleen Widdoes	As the World Turns	Emma Snyder	CBS	
1988 (15th)
1988 (15th)	Ellen Wheeler ‡	All My Children	Cindy Parker	ABC	
1988 (15th)	Lisa Brown	As the World Turns	Iva Snyder	CBS	
1988 (15th)	Eileen Fulton	As the World Turns	Lisa McColl	CBS	
1988 (15th)	Maeve Kinkead	Guiding Light	Vanessa Chamberlain	CBS	
1988 (15th)	Robin Mattson	Santa Barbara	Gina Blake Lockridge	NBC	
1988 (15th)	Arleen Sorkin	Days of Our Lives	Calliope Jones	NBC	
1989 (16th)
1989 (16th)	Nancy Lee Grahn ‡	Santa Barbara	Julia Wainwright Capwell	NBC	
1989 (16th)	Debbi Morgan ‡	All My Children	Angie Hubbard	ABC	
1989 (16th)	Jane Elliot	Days of Our Lives	Anjelica Deveraux	NBC	
1989 (16th)	Robin Mattson	Santa Barbara	Gina Blake Lockridge	NBC	
1989 (16th)	Arleen Sorkin	Days of Our Lives	Calliope Jones	NBC	

=== 1990s ===
Year	Actress	Program	Role	Network	Ref.
1990 (17th)
1990 (17th)	Julia Barr ‡	All My Children	Brooke English	ABC	
1990 (17th)	Mary Jo Catlett	General Hospital	Mary Finnegan	ABC	
1990 (17th)	Michelle Forbes	Guiding Light	Sonni Carrera	CBS	
1990 (17th)	Lynn Herring	General Hospital	Lucy Coe	ABC	
1990 (17th)	Jess Walton	The Young and the Restless	Jill Abbott	CBS	
1991 (18th)
1991 (18th)	Jess Walton ‡	The Young and the Restless	Jill Abbott	CBS	
1991 (18th)	Darlene Conley	The Bold and the Beautiful	Sally Spectra	CBS	
1991 (18th)	Maureen Garrett	Guiding Light	Holly Lindsey	CBS	
1991 (18th)	Jill Larson	All My Children	Opal Cortlandt	ABC	
1991 (18th)	Kathleen Widdoes	As the World Turns	Emma Snyder	CBS	
1992 (19th)
1992 (19th)	Maeve Kinkead ‡	Guiding Light	Vanessa Chamberlain	CBS	
1992 (19th)	Darlene Conley	The Bold and the Beautiful	Sally Spectra	CBS	
1992 (19th)	Linda Dano	Another World	Felicia Gallant	NBC	
1992 (19th)	Maureen Garrett	Guiding Light	Holly Lindsey	CBS	
1992 (19th)	Lynn Herring	General Hospital	Lucy Coe	ABC	
1993 (20th)
1993 (20th)	Ellen Parker ‡	Guiding Light	Maureen Bauer	CBS	
1993 (20th)	Kimberlin Brown	The Young and the Restless	Sheila Carter	CBS	
1993 (20th)	Jane Elliot	General Hospital	Tracy Quartermaine	ABC	
1993 (20th)	Jill Larson	All My Children	Opal Cortlandt	ABC	
1993 (20th)	Tonja Walker	One Life to Live	Alex Olanov	ABC	
1994 (21st)
1994 (21st)	Susan Haskell ‡	One Life to Live	Marty Saybrooke	ABC	
1994 (21st)	Signy Coleman	The Young and the Restless	Hope Adams Wilson	CBS	
1994 (21st)	Hilary Edson	Guiding Light	Eve Guthrie	CBS	
1994 (21st)	Maureen Garrett	Guiding Light	Holly Lindsey	CBS	
1994 (21st)	Sharon Wyatt	General Hospital	Tiffany Donely	ABC	
1995 (22nd)
1995 (22nd)	Rena Sofer ‡	General Hospital	Lois Cerullo	ABC	
1995 (22nd)	Jean Carol	Guiding Light	Nadine Cooper	CBS	
1995 (22nd)	Melina Kanakaredes	Guiding Light	Eleni Andros Cooper	CBS	
1995 (22nd)	Sydney Penny	All My Children	Julia Santos	ABC	
1995 (22nd)	Jacklyn Zeman	General Hospital	Bobbie Spencer	ABC	
1996 (23rd)
1996 (23rd)	Anna Holbrook ‡	Another World	Sharlene Frame	NBC	
1996 (23rd)	Rosalind Cash	General Hospital	Mary Mae Ward	ABC	
1996 (23rd)	Victoria Rowell	The Young and the Restless	Drucilla Winters	CBS	
1996 (23rd)	Michelle Stafford	The Young and the Restless	Phyllis Summers Romalotti	CBS	
1996 (23rd)	Tonya Lee Williams	The Young and the Restless	Olivia Barber Hastings	CBS	
1997 (24th)
1997 (24th)	Michelle Stafford ‡	The Young and the Restless	Phyllis Summers Romalotti	CBS	
1997 (24th)	Eva LaRue	All My Children	Maria Santos Grey	ABC	
1997 (24th)	Vanessa Marcil	General Hospital	Brenda Barrett	ABC	
1997 (24th)	Victoria Rowell	The Young and the Restless	Drucilla Winters	CBS	
1997 (24th)	Jacklyn Zeman	General Hospital	Bobbie Spencer	ABC	
1998 (25th)
1998 (25th)	Julia Barr ‡	All My Children	Brooke English	ABC	
1998 (25th)	Amy Carlson	Another World	Josie Watts	NBC	
1998 (25th)	Amy Ecklund	Guiding Light	Abigail Blume	CBS	
1998 (25th)	Vanessa Marcil	General Hospital	Brenda Barrett	ABC	
1998 (25th)	Victoria Rowell	The Young and the Restless	Drucilla Winters	CBS	
1999 (26th)
1999 (26th)	Sharon Case ‡	The Young and the Restless	Sharon Newman	CBS	
1999 (26th)	Jennifer Bassey	All My Children	Marian Colby	ABC	
1999 (26th)	Beth Ehlers	Guiding Light	Harley Cooper	CBS	
1999 (26th)	Kathleen Noone	Sunset Beach	Bette Katzenkazrahi	NBC	
1999 (26th)	Kelly Ripa	All My Children	Hayley Vaughan	ABC	

=== 2000s ===
Year	Actress	Program	Role	Network	Ref.
2000 (27th)
2000 (27th)	Sarah Joy Brown ‡	General Hospital	Carly Benson	ABC	
2000 (27th)	Sharon Case	The Young and the Restless	Sharon Newman	CBS	
2000 (27th)	Patrika Darbo	Days of Our Lives	Nancy Wesley	NBC	
2000 (27th)	Nancy Lee Grahn	General Hospital	Alexis Davis	ABC	
2000 (27th)	Tonya Lee Williams	The Young and the Restless	Olivia Barber Hastings	CBS	
2001 (28th)
2001 (28th)	Lesli Kay ‡	As the World Turns	Molly Conlan	CBS	
2001 (28th)	Rebecca Budig	All My Children	Greenlee Smythe	ABC	
2001 (28th)	Cady McClain	All My Children	Dixie Cooney	ABC	
2001 (28th)	Maura West	As the World Turns	Carly Tenney	CBS	
2001 (28th)	Colleen Zenk Pinter	As the World Turns	Barbara Ryan	CBS	
2002 (29th)
2002 (29th)	Crystal Chappell ‡	Guiding Light	Olivia Spencer	CBS	
2002 (29th)	Beth Ehlers	Guiding Light	Harley Cooper	CBS	
2002 (29th)	Kelley Menighan Hensley	As the World Turns	Emily Stewart	CBS	
2002 (29th)	Kelly Ripa	All My Children	Hayley Vaughan	ABC	
2002 (29th)	Maura West	As the World Turns	Carly Tenney	CBS	
2003 (30th)
2003 (30th)	Vanessa Marcil ‡	General Hospital	Brenda Barrett	ABC	
2003 (30th)	Rebecca Budig	All My Children	Greenlee Smythe	ABC	
2003 (30th)	Robin Christopher	General Hospital	Skye Chandler	ABC	
2003 (30th)	Linda Dano	One Life to Live	Rae Cummings	ABC	
2003 (30th)	Cady McClain	As the World Turns	Rosanna Cabot	CBS	
2003 (30th)	Kelly Monaco	Port Charles	Livvie Locke/Tess Ramsey	ABC	
2004 (31st)
2004 (31st)	Cady McClain ‡	As the World Turns	Rosanna Cabot	CBS	
2004 (31st)	Kathy Brier	One Life to Live	Marcie Walsh	ABC	
2004 (31st)	Sharon Case	The Young and the Restless	Sharon Newman	CBS	
2004 (31st)	Ilene Kristen	One Life to Live	Roxy Balsom	ABC	
2004 (31st)	Heather Tom	The Young and the Restless	Victoria Newman	CBS	
2005 (32nd)
2005 (32nd)	Natalia Livingston ‡	General Hospital	Emily Quartermaine	ABC	
2005 (32nd)	Crystal Chappell	Guiding Light	Olivia Spencer	CBS	
2005 (32nd)	Robin Christopher	General Hospital	Skye Chandler	ABC	
2005 (32nd)	Jeanne Cooper	The Young and the Restless	Katherine Chancellor	CBS	
2005 (32nd)	Ilene Kristen	One Life to Live	Roxy Balsom	ABC	
2005 (32nd)	Heather Tom	One Life to Live	Kelly Cramer	ABC	
2006 (33rd)
2006 (33rd)	Gina Tognoni ‡	Guiding Light	Dinah Marler	CBS	
2006 (33rd)	Tracey E. Bregman	The Young and the Restless	Lauren Fenmore	CBS	
2006 (33rd)	Crystal Chappell	Guiding Light	Olivia Spencer	CBS	
2006 (33rd)	Jennifer Ferrin	As the World Turns	Jennifer Munson	CBS	
2006 (33rd)	Renée Elise Goldsberry	One Life to Live	Evangeline Williamson	ABC	
2007 (34th)
2007 (34th)	Genie Francis ‡	General Hospital	Laura Spencer	ABC	
2007 (34th)	Renée Elise Goldsberry	One Life to Live	Evangeline Williamson	ABC	
2007 (34th)	Rebecca Herbst	General Hospital	Elizabeth Webber	ABC	
2007 (34th)	Lesli Kay	The Bold and the Beautiful	Felicia Forrester	CBS	
2007 (34th)	Gina Tognoni	Guiding Light	Dinah Marler	CBS	
2007 (34th)	Heather Tom	One Life to Live	Kelly Cramer	ABC	
2008 (35th)
2008 (35th)	Gina Tognoni ‡	Guiding Light	Dinah Marler	CBS	
2008 (35th)	Tracey E. Bregman	The Young and the Restless	Lauren Fenmore Baldwin	CBS	
2008 (35th)	Judi Evans	Days of Our Lives	Bonnie Lockhart/Adrienne Johnson	NBC	
2008 (35th)	Kelley Menighan Hensley	As the World Turns	Emily Stewart	CBS	
2008 (35th)	Heather Tom	The Bold and the Beautiful	Katie Logan	CBS	
2009 (36th)
2009 (36th)	Tamara Braun ‡	Days of Our Lives	Ava Vitali	NBC	
2009 (36th)	Melissa Claire Egan	All My Children	Annie Lavery	ABC	
2009 (36th)	Alicia Minshew	All My Children	Kendall Hart	ABC	
2009 (36th)	Julie Pinson	As the World Turns	Janet Ciccone Snyder	CBS	
2009 (36th)	Bree Williamson	One Life to Live	Jessica Buchanan	ABC	

=== 2010s ===
Year	Actress	Program	Role	Network	Ref.
2010 (37th)
2010 (37th)	Julie Pinson ‡	As the World Turns	Janet Ciccone Snyder	CBS	
2010 (37th)	Beth Chamberlin	Guiding Light	Beth Raines	CBS	
2010 (37th)	Carolyn Hennesy	General Hospital	Diane Miller	ABC	
2010 (37th)	Bree Williamson	One Life to Live	Jessica Buchanan	ABC	
2010 (37th)	Arianne Zucker	Days of Our Lives	Nicole Walker	NBC	
2011 (38th)
2011 (38th)	Heather Tom ‡	The Bold and the Beautiful	Katie Logan Spencer	CBS	
2011 (38th)	Tricia Cast	The Young and the Restless	Nina Webster	CBS	
2011 (38th)	Melissa Claire Egan	All My Children	Annie Chandler	ABC	
2011 (38th)	Nancy Lee Grahn	General Hospital	Alexis Davis	ABC	
2011 (38th)	Julie Pinson	As the World Turns	Janet Ciccone	CBS	
2011 (38th)	Bree Williamson	One Life to Live	Jessica Buchanan	ABC	
2012 (39th)
2012 (39th)	Nancy Lee Grahn ‡	General Hospital	Alexis Davis	ABC	
2012 (39th)	Melissa Claire Egan	All My Children	Annie Chandler	ABC	
2012 (39th)	Genie Francis	The Young and the Restless	Genevieve Atkinson	CBS	
2012 (39th)	Elizabeth Hendrickson	The Young and the Restless	Chloe Mitchell	CBS	
2012 (39th)	Rebecca Herbst	General Hospital	Elizabeth Webber	ABC	
2013 (40th)
2013 (40th)	Julie Marie Berman ‡	General Hospital	Lulu Spencer	ABC	
2013 (40th)	Melissa Claire Egan	The Young and the Restless	Chelsea Newman	CBS	
2013 (40th)	Jessica Collins	The Young and the Restless	Avery Bailey Clark	CBS	
2013 (40th)	Katherine Kelly Lang	The Bold and the Beautiful	Brooke Logan	CBS	
2013 (40th)	Arianne Zucker	Days of Our Lives	Nicole Walker	NBC	
2014 (41st)
2014 (41st)	Amelia Heinle ‡	The Young and the Restless	Victoria Newman	CBS	
2014 (41st)	Melissa Claire Egan	The Young and the Restless	Chelsea Newman	CBS	
2014 (41st)	Jane Elliot	General Hospital	Tracy Quartermaine	ABC	
2014 (41st)	Elizabeth Hendrickson	The Young and the Restless	Chloe Fisher	CBS	
2014 (41st)	Kelly Sullivan	General Hospital	Connie Falconeri	ABC	
2015 (42nd)
2015 (42nd)	Amelia Heinle ‡	The Young and the Restless	Victoria Newman	CBS	
2015 (42nd)	Linsey Godfrey	The Bold and the Beautiful	Caroline Spencer	CBS	
2015 (42nd)	Elizabeth Hendrickson	The Young and the Restless	Chloe Fisher	CBS	
2015 (42nd)	Finola Hughes	General Hospital	Anna Devane	ABC	
2015 (42nd)	Lisa LoCicero	General Hospital	Olivia Falconeri	ABC	
2016 (43rd)
2016 (43rd)	Jessica Collins ‡	The Young and the Restless	Avery Bailey Clark	CBS	
2016 (43rd)	Lauralee Bell	The Young and the Restless	Christine Williams	CBS	
2016 (43rd)	Linsey Godfrey	The Bold and the Beautiful	Caroline Spencer	CBS	
2016 (43rd)	Peggy McCay	Days of Our Lives	Caroline Brady	NBC	
2016 (43rd)	Melissa Reeves	Days of Our Lives	Jennifer Horton	NBC	
2017 (44th)
2017 (44th)	Kate Mansi ‡	Days of Our Lives	Abigail Deveraux	NBC	
2017 (44th)	Stacy Haiduk	The Young and the Restless	Patty Williams	CBS	
2017 (44th)	Anna Maria Horsford	The Bold and the Beautiful	Vivienne Avant	CBS	
2017 (44th)	Finola Hughes	General Hospital	Anna Devane	ABC	
2017 (44th)	Kelly Sullivan	The Young and the Restless	Sage Warner	CBS	
2018 (45th)
2018 (45th)	Camryn Grimes ‡	The Young and the Restless	Mariah Copeland	CBS	
2018 (45th)	Marla Adams	The Young and the Restless	Dina Abbott Mergeron	CBS	
2018 (45th)	Susan Seaforth Hayes	Days of Our Lives	Julie Olson Williams	NBC	
2018 (45th)	Elizabeth Hendrickson	The Young and the Restless	Chloe Fisher	CBS	
2018 (45th)	Jacqueline MacInnes Wood	The Bold and the Beautiful	Steffy Forrester	CBS	
2018 (45th)	Mishael Morgan	The Young and the Restless	Hilary Curtis	CBS	
2019 (46th)
2019 (46th)	Vernee Watson ‡	General Hospital	Stella Henry	ABC	
2019 (46th)	Kassie DePaiva	Days of Our Lives	Eve Donovan	NBC	
2019 (46th)	Linsey Godfrey	Days of Our Lives	Sarah Horton	NBC	
2019 (46th)	Martha Madison	Days of Our Lives	Belle Black	NBC	
2019 (46th)	Beth Maitland	The Young and the Restless	Traci Abbott	CBS	
2019 (46th)	Mishael Morgan	The Young and the Restless	Hilary Curtis	CBS	

=== 2020s ===
Year	Actress	Program	Role	Network	Ref.
2020 (47th)
2020 (47th)	Tamara Braun ‡	General Hospital	Dr. Kim Nero	ABC	
2020 (47th)	Rebecca Budig	General Hospital	Hayden Barnes	ABC	
2020 (47th)	Susan Seaforth Hayes	Days of Our Lives	Julie Olson Williams	NBC	
2020 (47th)	Christel Khalil	The Young and the Restless	Lily Winters	CBS	
2020 (47th)	Annika Noelle	The Bold and the Beautiful	Hope Logan	CBS	
2021 (48th)
2021 (48th)	Marla Adams ‡	The Young and the Restless	Dina Mergeron	CBS	
2021 (48th)	Tamara Braun	Days of Our Lives	Ava Vitali	NBC	
2021 (48th)	Carolyn Hennesy	General Hospital	Diane Miller	ABC	
2021 (48th)	Briana Nicole Henry	General Hospital	Jordan Ashford	ABC	
2021 (48th)	Courtney Hope	The Bold and the Beautiful	Sally Spectra	CBS	
2022 (49th)
2022 (49th)	Kelly Thiebaud ‡	General Hospital	Dr. Britt Westbourne	ABC	
2022 (49th)	Kimberlin Brown	The Bold and the Beautiful	Sheila Carter	CBS	
2022 (49th)	Nancy Lee Grahn	General Hospital	Alexis Davis	ABC	
2022 (49th)	Stacy Haiduk	Days of Our Lives	Kristen DiMera	NBC	
2022 (49th)	Melissa Ordway	The Young and the Restless	Abby Newman	CBS	
2023 (50th)
2023 (50th)	Sonya Eddy †	General Hospital	Epiphany Johnson	ABC	
2023 (50th)	Krista Allen	The Bold and the Beautiful	Dr. Taylor Hayes	CBS	
2023 (50th)	Stacy Haiduk	Days of Our Lives	Kristen DiMera	NBC/Peacock	
2023 (50th)	Brook Kerr	General Hospital	Dr. Portia Robinson	ABC	
2023 (50th)	Kelly Thiebaud	General Hospital	Dr. Britt Westbourne	ABC	
2024 (51st)
2024 (51st)	Courtney Hope ‡	The Young and the Restless	Sally Spectra	CBS	
2024 (51st)	Jennifer Gareis	The Bold and the Beautiful	Donna Logan	CBS	
2024 (51st)	Linsey Godfrey	Days of Our Lives	Sarah Horton	Peacock	
2024 (51st)	Allison Lanier	The Young and the Restless	Summer Newman Abbott	CBS	
2024 (51st)	Emily O'Brien	Days of Our Lives	Gwen Rizczech	Peacock	
2025 (52nd)
2025 (52nd)	Susan Walters ‡	The Young and the Restless	Diane Jenkins Abbott	CBS	
2025 (52nd)	Linsey Godfrey	Days of Our Lives	Sarah Horton	Peacock	
2025 (52nd)	Courtney Hope	The Young and the Restless	Sally Spectra	CBS	
2025 (52nd)	Kate Mansi	General Hospital	Kristina Corinthos Davis	ABC	
2025 (52nd)	Emily O'Brien	Days of Our Lives	Theresa Donovan	Peacock	
2026 (53rd)
2026 (53rd)	Beth Maitland ‡	The Young and the Restless	Traci Abbott	CBS	
2026 (53rd)	Linsey Godfrey	Days of Our Lives	Sarah Horton	Peacock	
2026 (53rd)	Camryn Grimes	The Young and the Restless	Mariah Copeland	CBS	
2026 (53rd)	Trisha Mann-Grant	Beyond the Gates	Leslie Thomas	CBS	
2026 (53rd)	Amanda Setton	General Hospital	Brook Lynn Quartermaine	ABC	

== Performers with multiple wins ==
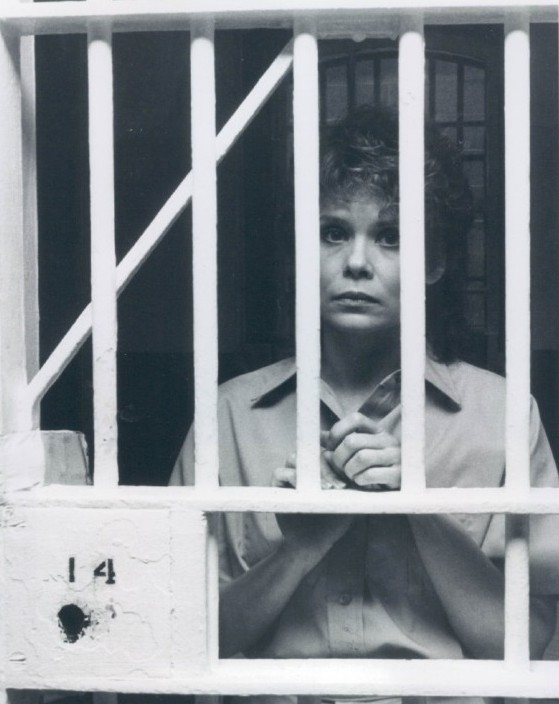
Julia Barr is one of the actresses who has received the award more than once, winning twice for her role as Brooke English on All My Children.

The following individuals received two or more wins in this category:

2 wins

- Julia Barr
- Tamara Braun
- Nancy Lee Grahn
- Amelia Heinle
- Beth Maitland
- Gina Tognoni

== Performers with multiple nominations ==
The following individuals received two or more nominations in this category:

6 nominations

- Linsey Godfrey

5 nominations

- Melissa Claire Egan
- Nancy Lee Grahn
- Heather Tom

4 nominations

- Jane Elliot
- Elizabeth Hendrickson
- Lois Kibbee
- Robin Mattson

3 nominations

- Tamara Braun
- Rebecca Budig
- Sharon Case
- Crystal Chappell
- Maureen Garrett
- Stacy Haiduk
- Eileen Herlie
- Courtney Hope
- Maeve Kinkead
- Elizabeth Lawrence
- Beth Maitland
- Vanessa Marcil
- Cady McClain
- Julie Pinson
- Victoria Rowell
- Gina Tognoni
- Kathleen Widdoes
- Bree Williamson
- Jacklyn Zeman

2 nominations

- Marla Adams
- Julia Barr
- Kimberlin Brown
- Lisa Brown
- Tracey E. Bregman
- Robin Christopher
- Jessica Collins
- Darlene Conley
- Linda Dano
- Beth Ehlers
- Judi Evans
- Genie Francis
- Renée Elise Goldsberry
- Camryn Grimes
- Amelia Heinle
- Carolyn Hennesy
- Kate Mansi
- Kelley Menighan Hensley
- Rebecca Herbst
- Lynn Herring
- Finola Hughes
- Melina Kanakaredes
- Lesli Kay
- Ilene Kristen
- Jill Larson
- Peggy McCay
- Mishael Morgan
- Emily O'Brien
- Kelly Ripa
- Melissa Reeves
- Louise Shaffer
- Arleen Sorkin
- Kelly Sullivan
- Kelly Thiebaud
- Jess Walton
- Maura West
- Tonya Lee Williams
- Arianne Zucker

== Series with most awards ==
12 wins

- General Hospital
- The Young and the Restless

7 wins

- All My Children

6 wins

- Guiding Light

4 wins

- Days of our Lives

3 wins

- As the World Turns
