= 12th Daytime Emmy Awards =

- Date: August 1, 1985
- Presented by: National Academy of Television Arts and Sciences
- Hosted by: Bob Barker

Highlights
- Outstanding Drama Series: The Young and the Restless
- Outstanding Game Show: The $25,000 Pyramid

Television/radio coverage
- Network: CBS

The 12th Daytime Emmy Awards were held on Thursday, August 1, 1985, on CBS to commemorate excellence in daytime programming from March 6, 1984, to March 5, 1985. Two new categories were added: Outstanding Young Man in a Daytime Drama Series and Outstanding Ingenue in a Daytime Drama Series. Of the 13 categories (including Lifetime Achievement) available that year, the broadcast showed the presentation of awards in seven categories.

Broadcast from 3-4:30 p.m., it preempted Guiding Light and Body Language. The telecast marked the last time the Daytime Emmys would preempt any network programming airing at 4 p.m. EST.

Winners in each category are in bold.

== Outstanding Daytime Drama Series ==
- **The Young and the Restless**
- All My Children
- Days of Our Lives
- General Hospital
- Guiding Light

== Outstanding Actor in a Daytime Drama Series ==
- David Canary (Adam Chandler and Stuart Chandler, All My Children)
- James Mitchell (Palmer Cortlandt, All My Children)
- **Darnell Williams** (Jesse Hubbard, All My Children)
- Larry Bryggman (John Dixon, As the World Turns)
- Terry Lester (Jack Abbott, The Young and the Restless)

== Outstanding Actress in a Daytime Drama Series ==
- Susan Lucci (Erica Kane, All My Children)
- Gillian Spencer (Daisy Cortlandt, All My Children)
- Deidre Hall (Marlena Evans, Days of Our Lives)
- **Kim Zimmer** (Reva Shayne, **Guiding Light**)
- Robin Strasser (Dorian Lord, One Life to Live)

== Outstanding Supporting Actor in a Daytime Drama Series ==
- Louis Edmonds (Langley Wallingford, All My Children)
- Robert LuPone (Zach Grayson, All My Children)
- David Lewis (Edward Quartermaine, General Hospital)
- **Larry Gates** (H.B. Lewis, Guiding Light)
- Anthony Call (Herb Callison, One Life to Live)

== Outstanding Supporting Actress in a Daytime Drama Series ==
- Eileen Herlie (Myrtle Fargate, All My Children)
- Elizabeth Lawrence (Myra Sloane, All My Children)
- Norma Connolly (Ruby Anderson, General Hospital)
- Maeve Kinkead (Vanessa Chamberlain, Guiding Light)
- **Beth Maitland** (Traci Abbott, The Young and the Restless)

== Outstanding Young Man in a Daytime Drama Series ==
- Steve Caffrey (Andrew Cortlandt, All My Children)
- Michael E. Knight (Tad Martin, All My Children)
- **Brian Bloom** (Dusty Donovan, As the World Turns)
- Jack Wagner (Frisco Jones, General Hospital)
- Michael O'Leary (Rick Bauer, Guiding Light)

== Outstanding Ingenue in a Daytime Drama Series ==
- **Tracey E. Bregman** (**Lauren Fenmore Williams**, **The Young and the Restless**)
- Kristian Alfonso (Hope Williams, Days of Our Lives)
- Melissa Leo (Linda Warner, All My Children)
- Lisa Trusel (Melissa Anderson, Days of Our Lives)
- Tasia Valenza (Dottie Thornton, All My Children)

== Outstanding Daytime Drama Series Writing ==
- Another World
- Days of our Lives
- Guiding Light
- **All My Children**

== Outstanding Daytime Drama Series Directing ==
- All My Children
- One Life to Live
- As the World Turns
- **Guiding Light**
- Days of our Lives

== Outstanding Game Show ==
- **The $25,000 Pyramid** - A Bob-Sande Stewart Production for CBS
- Family Feud - A Mark Goodson Production for ABC (Syn. by Viacom)
- Jeopardy! - A Merv Griffin Production (Syn. by KingWorld)
- The Price Is Right - A Mark Goodson Production for CBS
- Wheel of Fortune - A Merv Griffin Production for NBC (Syn. by KingWorld)

== Outstanding Game Show Host ==
- **Dick Clark** (The $25,000 Pyramid)
- Bob Barker (The Price Is Right)
- Bill Cullen (Hot Potato)
- Richard Dawson (Family Feud)
- Pat Sajak (Wheel of Fortune)

== Outstanding Animated Program ==
- **Jim Henson, Margaret Loesch, Lee Gunther, Bob Richardson, John Gibbs, Hank Saroyan and Jeffrey Scott (Muppet Babies)**
- Joe Ruby, Ken Spears, Janice Karman, Ross Bagdasarian Jr., Charles A. Nichols, Rowby Goren, Janis Diamond, Cliff Ruby and Elana Lesser (Alvin and the Chipmunks)
- Lou Scheimer, Marsh Lamore, Phil Harnage and Rowby Goren (Fat Albert and the Cosby Kids)
- William Hanna, Joseph Barbera, Bob Hathcock, Gerard Baldwin, Carl Urbano, George Gordon, Ray Patterson, Oscar Dufau, John Walker, Rudy Zamora, Alan Zaslove, Tedd Anasti, Patsy Cameron and Sandy Fries (The Smurfs)

== Outstanding Film Sound Editing ==
- **Richard C. Allen, Robert T. Gillis, Richard Bruce Elliott, Michael L. DePatie, Michael Tomack and Ron Fedele (Muppet Babies)**
- David Gelfand (ABC Afterschool Specials)

== Lifetime achievement award ==
- **Charita Bauer**
- **Larry Haines**
- **Mary Stuart**
