= Suzanne Rogers =

American television actress (born 1943)

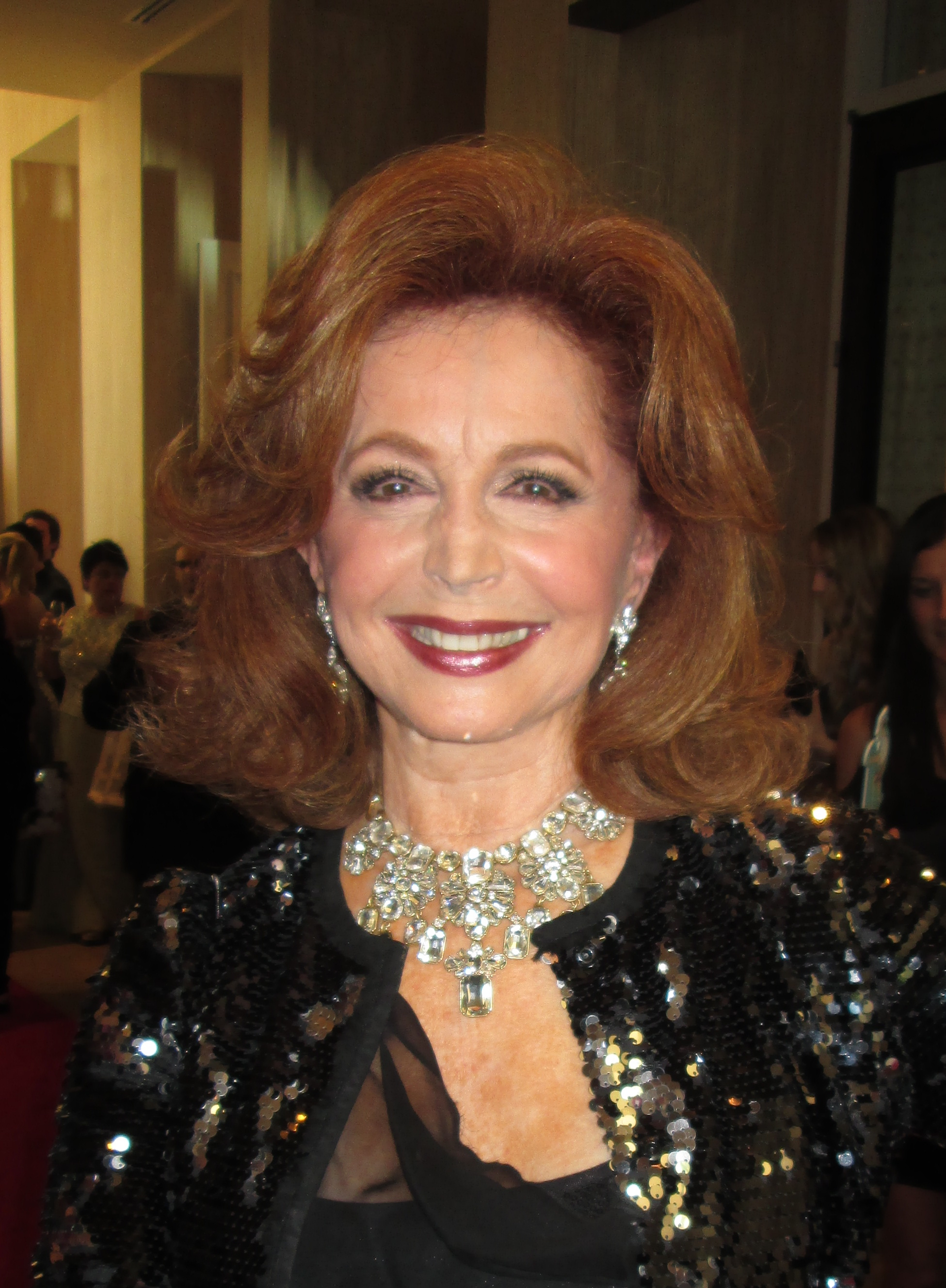
- Rogers in 2014
- Born: Suzanne Crumpler; July 9, 1943 (age 83)
- Education: Stella Adler Studio of Acting
- Occupation: Actress
- Years active: 1973–present
- Spouse: Sam Groom (m. 1980; div. 1982)

Suzanne Rogers (born Suzanne Crumpler, July 9, 1943) is an American actress with film and television credits. Her stage name was inspired by Ginger Rogers, whom she cites as a personal inspiration for joining the entertainment industry. Rogers got her start as a dancer/performer at New York City's Radio City Music Hall, but she is best known for playing Maggie Horton, a role she originated in 1973 on the NBC/Peacock soap opera Days of Our Lives. In her over five-decade run as Maggie, Rogers is the longest-running actor in an American soap opera and plays the longest-running character role in American soap opera history.

== Early years ==
Suzanne Rogers was born Suzanne Crumpler on July 9, 1943. While growing up in Colonial Heights, Virginia, she took an interest in dancing. She expressed interest in it at the age of two and started taking dancing lessons during her childhood.

== Career ==
At the age of 17, Rogers left her hometown and decided to pursue a dancing career. She moved to New York City and became one of the dancers at the Radio City Music Hall. Along with becoming a Rockette, Rogers performed in several Broadway musicals including Coco, Hallelujah Baby and Follies, distinctly heard on the original cast album and mentioned in the book Everything Was Possible which covered the creation and history of the hit Broadway show. After spending 10 years in New York City, the actress wanted to try out an acting dream and moved to California in January 1973.

She attended acting classes in California with Stella Adler at the Stella Adler Studio of Acting. Soon after, she landed the role of Maggie Horton on NBC's Days of Our Lives. Maggie was introduced as a guest character in August 1973, by scriptwriter William J. Bell and executive producer Betty Corday. From the beginning, Bell considered the role ideal for her. He approached Rogers about taking the role of Maggie, and she agreed. She was immediately described by critics who gave reviews of the show as being one of the most energetic girls on daytime television. The news of Rogers being cast as Maggie was a different move, taking an actress who loves to dance, to a character of a crippled farm girl. This was her first television assignment, after being the youngest girl to take the stage at Radio City Music Hall. In 1979, she was the first recipient of the Daytime Emmy Award for Outstanding Supporting Actress in a Drama Series.

In 1984, Rogers was diagnosed with the rare muscle disorder myasthenia gravis. This disease affected her facial muscles, and the medicine the doctors put her on made her feel ill, and her face appeared swollen while also suffering hair loss. She temporarily left the show after 11 years when the effects of the disease became increasingly worse.

Because of the myasthenia gravis and the medication, her entire appearance changed, and Rogers did not return to Days of Our Lives for a year. Rogers returned to the serial when her health became better. Rogers, wanting to educate viewers about the disease, encouraged executive producer Betty Corday to have her character be diagnosed with the disease. Corday agreed, and a storyline played out with Maggie learning she has myasthenia gravis. The actress went into remission in 1995, and has remained in remission since. In 2010, after her character's husband is killed off, Maggie began to notice some effects she experienced when diagnosed with the disease in 1984.

In 2003, a major series of serial killings occurred on the show. Maggie was "killed off" in a "whodunnit?" murder storyline involving a serial killer. Maggie's murder forced Rogers to depart from the series, although she made occasional appearances as Maggie's "spirit", appearing with all of the other victims when the apparent culprit, Marlena Evans, attacked Alice. To help with falling ratings at the time, current head writer James E. Reilly decided to bring all the characters back from the dead. They all turned up in the fictional town of Melaswen, or New Salem spelled backwards. This storyline sparked major controversy, and proved to be a daring move.

Since the death of original cast member Frances Reid (Alice Horton) in 2010, Rogers has been the longest-running actress to appear continuously on Days of Our Lives as the new Horton family matriarch.

In 2024, Rogers was honored with induction into the Emmys' Gold Circle by the National Academy of Television Arts and Sciences (NATAS). This award recognizes individuals who have made a significant and lasting impact on television for 50 years or more,

== Personal life ==
Rogers married Sam Groom in 1980. They divorced in 1982. In October 2025, she revealed she had undergone treatment for colorectal cancer.

== Filmography ==
Film
Year	Title	Role	Notes
1995	Never Say Never: The Deidre Hall Story	Herself and Maggie Horton	Television film

Television
Year	Title	Role	Notes
1973–present	Days of Our Lives	Maggie Horton	3300+ episodes
1977	Quincy, M.E.	Elaine Farrell	Episode: "The Two Sides of Truth"
1980	Little House on the Prairie	Molly Reardon	Episode: "Second Spring"
1985	Knight Rider	Lydia Arkett	Episode: "The Wrong Crowd"

== Awards and nominations ==
List of acting awards and nominations
Year	Award	Category	Title	Result	Ref.
1979	Daytime Emmy Award	Outstanding Supporting Actress in a Drama Series	Days of Our Lives	Won	
