= Norma Connolly =

American actress

- Born: August 27, 1927; Boston, Massachusetts, U.S.
- Died: November 18, 1998 (aged 71); Los Angeles, California, U.S.
- Education: Brandeis University
- Occupation: Actress
- Years active: 1951–98
- Known for: Lena Karr Gilroy (The Young Marrieds); Ruby Anderson (General Hospital)
- Spouse: Howard Rodman (m. 1954; died 1985)
- Children: 3

Norma Connolly (August 27, 1927 – November 18, 1998) was an American actress having a career spanning five decades and known for her roles on The Young Marrieds as Lena Karr Gilroy and General Hospital as Ruby Anderson.

== Early life ==
Connolly was born on August 27, 1927, in Boston, Massachusetts to Beulah and Archie Connolly, where her father owned a lumber business. She graduated from Brandeis University in 1958. Connolly studied acting with Morris Carnovsky at the Leland Powers School of Drama, with both Harold Clurman and Stella Adler at Actors Studio, and at the Cushing Academy.

== Career ==
=== Film and television ===
Connolly started her career as a guest star on Pulitzer Prize Playhouse in 1951. She next was in Celanese Theatre as Marcia in 1952. Connollly would guest star in a number of television programs such as Danger, Naked City, The Twilight Zone, Dr. Kildare, Mr. Novak, The F.B.I., I Dream of Jeannie, The Bold Ones: The New Doctors, Columbo, Little House on the Prairie, and Charlie's Angels. She starred in the made-for-TV-movies Mr. and Mrs. Cop and F. Scott Fitzgerald in Hollywood. Connolly starred in the miniseries QB VII as Corinne. She is best known for her roles as Lena Karr Gilroy in The Young Marrieds from 1964 to 1966 and Ruby Anderson on General Hospital from 1979 to 1998. She was in Alfred Hitchcock's The Wrong Man (1956), Robert Lewin's Third of a Man (1962), Robert Mulligan's The Other (1972), and James Goldstone's They Only Kill Their Masters (1972). She was nominated for a Daytime Emmy Award for her performance as Ruby Anderson in 1985 at the 12th Daytime Emmy Awards.

=== Theatre ===
On stage, Connolly was in A Streetcar Named Desire on Broadway. She was in Night of the Iguana and The Crucible at Los Angeles' Ahmanson Theatre. Connolly also appeared on Broadway in such plays as The Love of Four Colonels and Make a Million.

== Personal life and death ==
Connolly married Howard Rodman in 1954; the marriage ended when he died on December 5, 1985. Together, they had three children: two sons and one daughter. She was active in the battle against AIDS, serving on the board of Hollywood Helps. Connolly addressed the concerns of actresses in their limited roles in television and film productions. She died on Wednesday, November 18, 1998, from complications of a stroke.

== Filmography ==
=== Film ===
Year	Title	Role	Notes
1956	The Wrong Man	Betty Todd	Docudrama film directed by Alfred Hitchcock.
1962	Third of a Man	Extra	Drama film directed and written by Robert Lewin.; Uncredited
1972	The Other	Aunt Vee	Psychological thriller film directed by Robert Mulligan and adapted for film by Tom Tryon from his novel of the same name.
1972	They Only Kill Their Masters	Mrs. DeCamp	Mystery film directed by James Goldstone.

=== Television ===
Year	Title	Role	Notes
1951	Pulitzer Prize Playhouse	Guest	Episode: "Ned McCobb's Daughter" (S 1:Ep 15)
1952	Celanese Theatre	Marcia	Episode: "On Borrowed Time" (S 1:Ep 20)
1953	Danger	Guest	Episode: "Missing Night" (S 3:Ep 41)
1956	Star Stage	Guest	Episode: "Scandal on Deepside" (S 1:Ep 30)
1959	Alcoa Theatre	Guest	Episode: "How's Business?" (S 2:Ep 15)
1960	Naked City	Ruth Peters	Episode: "Killer with a Kiss" (S 2:Ep 6)
1961	The Twilight Zone	Night Nurse	Episode: "Twenty Two" (S 2:Ep 17)
1962	The Real McCoys	Carol Dorset	Episode: "The Washing Machine" (S 5:Ep 13)
1962	Dr. Kildare	Therapist	Episode: "Breakdown" (S 2:Ep 7)
1962	Eleventh Hour	Ruth	Episode: "Ruth" (S 1:Ep 7)
1962	The Real McCoys	Ethel	Episode: "Luke the Reporter" (S 6:Ep 13)
1963	The Lloyd Bridges Show	Winnie	Episode: "The Ramp" (S 1:Ep 31)
1963	Naked City	Pearl Wystemski	Episode: "Golden Lads and Girls" (S 4:Ep 33)
1964	Many Happy Returns	Laughing Woman	Episode: "Walter Meets the Machine" (S 1:Ep 2)
1964	The Young Marrieds	Lena Karr Gilroy	Contract role from October 5, 1964 – March 25, 1966
1964	Mr. Novak	Mrs. Parker	Episode: "'A' Is for Anxiety" (S 2:Ep 10)
1965	Ben Casey	Mrs. Mangiopani	Episode: "Eulogy in Four Flats" (S 4:Ep 24)
1965	The F.B.I.	Woman	Episode: "The Giant Killer" (S 1:Ep 10)
1966	Gidget	Miss Beckley	Episode: "Ask Helpful Hannah" (S 1:Ep 29)
1966	The F.B.I.	Aline Spencer	Episode: "The Animal" (S 1:Ep 29)
1967	The Invaders	Waitress	Episode: "The Spores" (S 2:Ep 7)
1967	Dundee and the Culhane	Guest	Episode: "The Widow's Weeds Brief" (S 1:Ep 11)
1970	I Dream of Jeannie	Mrs. Ross	Episode: "Jeannie, the Recording Secretary" (S 5:Ep 20)
1970	Adam-12	Eva Foster	Episode: "Log 75: Have a Nice Weekend" (S 3:Ep 7)
1970	The Bold Ones: The New Doctors	Mrs. Dorsey	Episode: "First: No Harm to the Patient" (S 2:Ep 4)
1971	The F.B.I.	Ruth Oliver	Episode: "Unknown Victim" (S 6:Ep 15)
1971	Columbo	Celia	Episode: "Ransom for a Dead Man" (Second pilot)
1972	The Man and the City	Guest	Episode: "Diagnosis: Corruption" (S 1:Ep 15)
1973	The Streets of San Francisco	Mrs. Carter	Episode: "A Wrongful Death" (S 2:Ep 1)
1974	QB VII	Corinne	Miniseries directed by Tom Gries
1974	Mr. and Mrs. Cop	Mother	Made-for-TV-Movie directed by Harvey Hart.
1974	Ironside	Lydia Todd	Episodes: Raise the Devil: Part 1 (S 8:Ep 1); Raise the Devil: Part 2 (S 8:Ep 2)
1974	Police Woman	Stage Mother	Episode: "The Beautiful Die Young" (S 1:Ep 2)
1974	Little House on the Prairie	Mrs. Kirkwood	Episode: "Ma's Holiday" (S 1:Ep 8)
1975	Harry O	Mrs. Hodges	Episode:"Lester" (S 1:Ep 20)
1975	F. Scott Fitzgerald in Hollywood	Zelda's Nurse	Made-for-TV-Movie directed by Anthony Page.
1976	Police Woman	Landlady	Episode: "Mother Love" (S 2:Ep 22)
1976	The Bionic Woman	Mrs. Noah	Episode: "Jaime's Mother" (S 1:Ep 8)
1976	Charlie's Angels	Mrs. Lemson	Episode: "Hellride" (S 1:Ep 1)
1977	Mary Hartman, Mary Hartman	Prisoner	Episode: "Episode #2.90" (S 2:Ep 153)
1977	The Edge of Night	Mrs. Yost	Unknown number of episodes
1979-1997	General Hospital	Ruby Anderson	Contract role (final appearance)
1999	Intimate Portrait	Herself	Episode: "Donna Reed"; Aired posthumously

== Awards and nominations ==
List of acting awards and nominations
Year	Award	Category	Title	Result	Ref.
1985	Daytime Emmy Award	Outstanding Supporting Actress in a Drama Series	General Hospital	Nominated	

== See also ==
- List of longest-serving soap opera actors
