= Traci Abbott =

Fictional character from The Young and the Restless

- The Young and the Restless character
- Beth Maitland as Traci Abbott
- Portrayed by: Beth Maitland (1982–present); Valentina Sky Gordon (2018)
- Duration: 1982–1996; 1999; 2001–2002; 2006–present
- First appearance: June 17, 1982
- Created by: William J. Bell
- Introduced by: H. Wesley Kenney (1982); Edward J. Scott (1999, 2001); John F. Smith (2006); Bradley Bell (2007)
- Crossover appearances: The Bold and the Beautiful
In-universe information
- Other names: Traci Carlton; Traci Connelly
- Occupation: Novelist; Singer; Fan club president; CEO of Jabot
- Parents: John Abbott; Dina Mergeron
- Siblings: Jack Abbott; Ashley Abbott; Eric Vanderway; Billy Abbott
- Spouse: Danny Romalotti (1985); Brad Carlton (1986–1989, 1991–1992); Steve Connelly (1993–2014)
- Children: Colleen Carlton
- Grandparents: Robert Abbott
- Uncles: Ivan Abbott
- Nieces and nephews: Keemo Volien Abbott; John Abbott III; Abby Newman; Theo Vanderway; Kyle Abbott; Delia Abbott; Johnny Abbott; Katie Abbott; Allie Nguyen; Harrison Locke; Ruby Spectra-Abbott

Traci Abbott is a fictional character from the CBS soap opera, The Young and the Restless. Created and introduced by William J. Bell, the role has been portrayed by Beth Maitland since 1982. Traci is the daughter of John Abbott and Dina Mergeron.

Initially a short-term role that would last three months, Maitland impressed the series' producers and was placed on contract, remaining until 1996. Traci was known for her relationship with Danny Romalotti and her marriages to Brad Carlton, with whom she had a daughter, Colleen. Both relationships caused a notable rivalry with Lauren Fenmore.

Since 2006, Maitland has remained on a recurring status with the soap opera. Described as a fan favorite by Soaps in Depth, Maitland's portrayal won the 1985 Daytime Emmy Award for Outstanding Supporting Actress in a Drama Series, with additional nominations in the category in 2019 and 2026.

== Casting ==
Intended to be a short-term contract role lasting three months, Maitland impressed the producers. She stayed with the show on from June 17, 1982, to June 4, 1987, and from November 24, 1987 to December 22, 1989, September 1990 to June 1993, making guest appearances in December 1993, February to August 1994, February to April 1995, and April to May 1996. She reappeared in 1999, 2001 through 2002, and since 2006 on a recurring basis. On March 20, 2007, Traci made an appearance on the show's sister soap opera, The Bold and the Beautiful. In 2009, Maitland recorded a song that served as the background music for Traci's daughter, Colleen Carlton's funeral. The song was entitled "An Angel's Lullaby." Since Maria Arena Bell became a writer for the show, Traci was seen more often: "It got to the point where the show stopped calling altogether and I thought my soap ship had sailed. But, after Maria took over, I suddenly had 30 episodes when [Traci's daughter] Colleen died – the biggest storyline I'd had in over 10 years. I don't have those problems anymore. I feel like an honored member of the cast. The climate has changed."

== Character development ==
Since the death of John Abbott, Traci has become the family rock. Although she is the second youngest Abbott sibling, Maitland says, "Traci has kind of moved into his spot to make everyone accountable in the Abbott universe. She's the conscience everyone has to 'fess up to." When her niece, Abby Newman (Marcy Rylan), began acting out, Tracy acted as a mediator between her siblings and her niece. Maitland said, "Traci sees all of Abby's nightmarish behavior, the drinking, the manipulative pranks, the naked-heiress stuff, as what it really is – a cry for help."

== Storylines ==
Like many of Genoa City's privileged youth, Traci Abbott attended boarding school until her return home in 1982. She had low self-esteem because she was overweight, and her older sister, Ashley Abbott, was more glamorous and successful than she was. Traci became the president of rocker Danny Romalotti's (Michael Damian) fan club, and she decided to attend college locally at Genoa City University to be near him. She became a singer in Danny's band, and she fought for his attention with Lauren Fenmore (Tracey E. Bregman). In addition, Traci's mother, Dina, returned to town for the first time since she left Traci as an infant. The stress caused Traci to become conscious of her weight, and Lauren exploited her to get Danny's attention. Traci became addicted to diet pills while in college, and she would often sing (to the melody of "Turn to Stone" by the Electric Light Orchestra), "I turn to pills, when I'm feeling ill, I turn to pills". Her addiction culminated when she found out that Danny and Lauren were engaged. She got high, crashed her car and sustained serious heart damage. After her recovery, she went onstage at one of Danny's concerts to speak about the dangers of drug addiction.

Then, Traci began seeing her college professor, Tim Sullivan. When she found him in bed with another student, she became suicidal. She tried to kill herself, but Christine "Cricket" Blair (Lauralee Bell) saved her. Traci then found out that she was pregnant with Tim's child, and Danny Romalotti wanted to marry her to give the baby a family. They married in 1984, but Danny's former flame, Patty Williams (then played by Andrea Evans), was angry because Traci stole Danny. She pushed Traci down a flight of stairs, causing her to miscarry. Traci decided to annul her marriage to Danny, and Patty left town shortly after. Traci then got involved with groundskeeper Brad Carlton (Don Diamont). The two were quickly married in 1986, but Brad chose his budding career over his wife. Traci left town to continue her education at Stanford University.

During their separation, Brad had an affair with Lauren Fenmore, and Traci reconnected with Tim Sullivan. Still, Brad ended his romance with Lauren when Traci came home. To keep her in Genoa City, he agreed to have a baby with her. When Traci found out she was pregnant again, Brad's insane ex-wife, Lisa Mansfield, kidnapped Brad, and she tried to make Traci believe that Brad didn't love her anymore. Lisa's scheme caused Traci to have a second miscarriage. When Brad was freed, he worked to win Traci's heart, but instead, Ashley Abbott worked her magic, and she stole Brad from her younger sister. Thus, Traci and Brad divorced in 1989. She went on to write two best-selling books, Echoes of the Past and Epitaph for a Lover. The former novel was based on her life of living in Ashley's shadow.

Ashley eventually left Brad for Victor Newman (Eric Braeden). Brad spontaneously married Cassandra Rawlins, and he inherited her fortune when she died in a car accident. He then returned to Traci, and they were remarried in 1991. Traci was pregnant again soon after, and she kept the secret from everyone except her father because she wanted Brad to love her without obligations to their child. Soon, Brad grew close to Ashley again when her marriage to Victor fell apart. Still, Traci finally told Brad about their child, he refused to let her raise their child alone. Traci gave birth to Colleen Carlton in 1992. Colleen's birth did not help Brad and Traci's failing marriage, and they divorced later that year. Traci's publisher, Steve Connelly, moved to Genoa City, and the two soon began a romance. Brad became jealous, but he realized that Traci was truly happy. Then, Traci moved to New York City with Colleen, where she married Steve in 1993.

In 1994, Traci visited Brad at the hospital when he had a heart attack. Before leaving town, she got into a heated argument with Lauren Fenmore, whom she blamed for Brad's heart attack. In 1996, Traci returned to Genoa City when her father considered remarrying her mother, Dina Mergeron. In 1999, When the Abbotts reclaimed Jabot from Newman Enterprises, Traci returned home to join in the family celebration.

In 2001, Traci came home after she learned that Steve cheated on her. At first, Colleen did not believe her mother, but she turned on Steve when she learned the truth. Traci became close to Brad during her stay at home, but he was married to Ashley at the time. Traci decided to forgive Steve and work on their marriage, but Colleen became disgusted with her mother's "almost-reunion" with Brad. She rebelled against Traci and Steve until she was expelled from school for smoking marijuana. Then, Traci decided to send Colleen to Genoa City to live with her grandfather John Abbott. In 2006, John Abbott had a stroke, and Traci rushed to his bedside. John died soon after from complications from the stroke, and Traci truly began to see the hardships that her family faced while she was away. John's widow, Gloria Abbott (Judith Chapman), was hated by all of John's children. Traci was shocked to learn of the animosity that spread through her family, and she was also unaware of her siblings vendetta with their stepmother.

In 2007, Colleen was trapped in a burning building that was set on fire by Kevin Fisher (Greg Rikaart). Traci rushed to support her daughter, and she also reconnected with her sister, Ashley. Traci returned later that year when Jack dealt with the fallout from a fraud scandal. The next year, Traci was present at the Jabot Cosmetics annual stockholders meeting. She offered her support to Brad in his bid for CEO of the company, but Cane Ashby (Daniel Goddard) was appointed CEO in a turn of events. Several months later, Traci came home to attend the "funeral" of Katherine Chancellor (Jeanne Cooper). In reality, Katherine's doppelganger, Marge Cotrooke, had died. At the funeral, Traci ran into her mother, Dina, and the two argued about Dina's lacking role in Colleen's life. In addition, Lauren Fenmore apologized for the way she had treated Traci those many years ago. Traci went back to New York, but she returned again at Christmas to visit Colleen. She also shared a touching moment with Brad, and he called her "the one who got away." Several days later, Brad tragically drowned after he saved Noah Newman from a frozen pond. Traci stayed in town to attend Brad's funeral, and then she returned to New York.

Colleen was kidnapped by Patty Williams. Upon escaping, she fell into a lake, and she almost drowned. She was rushed to the hospital, only to be declared braindead. Patty shot Victor Newman when he attempted to help save Colleen from the lake, and Colleen's heart was donated to him at Traci's request. Traci's brother, Billy Abbott, organized a celebration of Colleen's life that all of her friends and family attended. All of the mourners present released red balloons to honor Colleen while Beth Maitland's song, "An Angel's Lullaby," played in the background. Traci and Steve stayed in town long enough to be present for the christening of Ashley's "daughter", Faith Colleen Abbott. Faith became Traci's goddaughter, and she wore Colleen's christening gown for the ceremony. Adam Newman (Michael Muhney) became Faith's godfather, but in a turn of events, he schemed to make Ashley believe that Faith was her child. In reality, Nick (Joshua Morrow) and Sharon Newman (Sharon Case) were Faith's biological parents. Adam stole Faith from Sharon at birth, and he passed the baby off as Ashley's baby. In reality, Ashley had a hysterical pregnancy, and she never actually gave birth. This dark point in Ashley's life occurred after Traci and Steve went back to New York City. Traci also returned to visit her family for Christmastime. In 2010, Colleen's best friend, Lily Winters (Christel Khalil), had recently overcome a battle with ovarian cancer. Lily could not bear children, but she and her husband, Cane Ashby, were able to conceive through a surrogate mother, Mackenzie Browning (Clementine Ford). When Lily and Cane's twins were born, Lily asked Traci to be their godmother in honor of Colleen, and Traci happily accepted. In 2011, Cane was shot to death on the steps of a church, and Traci attended his "funeral." In reality, Cane's twin brother, Caleb Atkinson, was killed on the church steps. Lily believed that she was having hallucinations because she was seeing Cane's "ghost." Traci was the only person to sympathize with Lily when everyone else thought that she was insane.

Traci's older brother, Jack Abbott, was preparing to marry Genevieve Atkinson (Genie Francis). Traci returned to Genoa City to spend time with Genevieve and her sister, Ashley, before the ceremony. On the day of the wedding, Patty Williams took Genevieve's wedding dress, and she crashed the wedding. She shot Jack when he realized who she was, and Jack refused to marry Genevieve because she bought his prized company, Beauty of Nature. Traci stayed by Jack's bedside in the hospital while the doctors told him that he may not be able to walk again. Traci returned in August for Jack's wedding to Nikki, and invited her sister Ashley to come home with her. Traci also returned to support Abby when Victor Newman supposedly died. Victor had been suffering amnesia and was involved in an explosion. As a result of Victor's "death", Jack was forced to sell Beauty of Nature, and Traci urged Jack to be careful in his business deals. Traci would return shortly thereafter as she moved back to the Abbott Mansion, and became a thorn in Jack's latest relationship with Phyllis Summers (Michelle Stafford), who recently moved in with Jack. Eventually, Traci gave her blessing, but an accident left Phyllis in a coma and she left for Georgia for experimental treatments. Traci briefly hinted to Jack that her return to Genoa City was sparked by issues with her marriage to Steve following Colleen's death.

In 2019, Traci writes another book based on Cane Ashby.

== Reception ==
Maitland won the Daytime Emmy Award for Outstanding Supporting Actress in a Drama Series for her role as Traci in 1985. In 2022, Charlie Mason from Soaps She Knows placed Traci 21st on his list of the best 25 characters from The Young and the Restless, commenting "What's that, you say? Traci's not exciting? Nothing happens to Traci? She doesn't even have a love interest? Traci, friends, is us. Beth Maitland's character is the voice of reason to which no one listens, the well-adjusted personality we should all aspire to be. Also, we couldn't freaking adore her more."
