= Beth Maitland =

American actress (born 1958)

- Born: May 12, 1958 (age 68); Rapid City, South Dakota, U.S.
- Occupation: Actress
- Years active: 1982–present
- Spouse: Christopher Banninger (m. 1989; div. 2018)
- Children: 1 daughter
- Awards: Daytime Emmy Award for Outstanding Supporting Actress in a Drama Series; 1985 The Young and the Restless

Beth Maitland (born May 12, 1958) is an American actress who is best known for her portrayal of Traci Abbott in the CBS Daytime soap opera The Young and the Restless from 1982 to 1996 and since 2001 on a recurring basis. For her performance in this role, she won the Daytime Emmy Award for Outstanding Supporting Actress in a Drama Series in 1985 and 2026.

== Biography ==
=== Early life ===
Born in Rapid City, South Dakota, Maitland and her family moved to Scottsdale, Arizona when she was seven. By age thirteen, she had already appeared in numerous community theatre and dinner theatre productions. She attended Arizona State University, majoring in music and theatre. Maitland moved to Los Angeles in 1978 and worked in night clubs while taking acting classes at the Los Angeles Film Industry Workshop.

=== Career ===
On television, Maitland has appeared in several made-for-television movies, and a supporting role in 1995 feature film Mr. Holland's Opus.

== Partial filmography ==
Year	Title	Role	Notes
1982–1996; 1999; 2001–present	The Young and the Restless	Traci Abbott Connelly	
1987	Plaza Suite		TV movie
1991	$100,000 Pyramid	Herself	
1995	Mr. Holland's Opus	Deaf School Principal	
2007	The Bold and the Beautiful	Traci Abbott Connelly	1 episode (March 20, 2007)
2013	The Grove	Gloria	TV movie
2017	Criminal Minds	Eleanor Parsons	Episode: "Surface Tension"
2019	Number 2	Renae	Short film

== Awards and nominations ==
List of acting awards and nominations
Year	Award	Category	Title	Result	Ref.
1985	Daytime Emmy Award	Outstanding Supporting Actress in a Drama Series	The Young and the Restless	Won	
1986	Soap Opera Digest Award	Outstanding Young Leading Actress on a Daytime Serial	The Young and the Restless	Nominated	
2019	Daytime Emmy Award	Outstanding Supporting Actress in a Drama Series	The Young and the Restless	Nominated	
2026	Daytime Emmy Award	Outstanding Supporting Actress in a Drama Series	The Young and the Restless	Won	
