= Recurring status =

Recurring status is a class of actors that perform on U.S. soap operas. Recurring status performers consistently act in less than three episodes out of a five-day work week, and receive a certain sum for each episode in which they appear. This is opposed to contract status, where the performers have a contract to be paid flat fees over time—often multi-year. Contract evaluations are periodically conducted, and actors that don't meet their "quota" may be dropped from their contract to cut costs. The practice has become widespread across the soap opera industry since the 1980s.

== Description ==
In the U.S. soap opera industry, actors billed as recurring status are paid a certain sum for each episode in which they appear. Conversely, actors on contract are paid a flat fee over a timeframe—often multi-year. Recurring performers consistently perform in less than three episodes out of a five-day work week whereas contract roles are guaranteed to appear in a certain number of episodes each week. Actors on contract are also committed to working for the show and cannot leave until the contract has expired; recurring roles allow actors to take other jobs.

Contract evaluations are typically done every fiscal quarter, and the actors that don't meet their "quota" of episodes are in danger of being dropped from their contract to cut costs. Former contract actors may then return as recurring cast members, and recurring actors can be promoted to a contract role.

== Dynamics ==
Almost unheard of from the beginning of television until the 1980s, more and more actors have been placed on "recurring" so the production company in charge of making the show doesn't go over-budget. Dwindling viewership and economic downturn have led to all U.S. soaps to placing actors (usually veterans who have been with the series in excess of ten years, and who are usually acclimated to higher salary figures) on recurring. Some actors accept the move to recurring status, while other actors balk at the contract cut, instead finding work on Broadway, prime time television series, or rival soap operas.

== Other regions ==
On Australian and British soap operas, contract negotiations are different, and a term such as "recurring status" does not exist. However, many of those shows have guest stars that appear frequently enough that literally speaking they could be described as "recurring".
