= Maeve Kinkead =

American actress

- Born: May 31, 1946 (age 80); New York City, U.S.
- Education: Radcliffe College
- Spouse: Harry Wilbur Streep III
- Children: 2

Maeve Kinkead (born May 31, 1946) is an American soap opera actress, writer and poet.

== Career ==
After numerous roles on stage, Kinkead's first major role was as Angie Perrini on the soap Another World (1975–80). Her longest running role was as Vanessa Chamberlain on the soap opera Guiding Light. She played the role on a contract basis from June 2, 1980 to August 28, 1981, February 1, 1982 to September 1996, and April 1997 to September 5, 2000. She garnered five Daytime Emmy nominations during her time on the show, winning for Outstanding Supporting Actress in 1992. In 1993, she received her first nomination as Outstanding Lead Actress.

In 2000, Kinkead left Guiding Light. She made special guest appearances as Vanessa in 2002 for Guiding Light's 65th anniversary on-screen. In 2005, Kinkead returned, and was included in the 70th anniversary cast photo. Kinkead appeared as Vanessa until the series finale on September 18, 2009.

== Other work ==
In 2008, Kinkead graduated from the Warren Wilson College Master of Fine Arts Program for Writers with a degree in poetry. She released her first book of poetry, A Dangling House, in 2017.

== Personal life ==
Kinkead lives in New York City with her husband Harry Streep, brother of actress Meryl Streep, and their children.

Kinkead was diagnosed with breast cancer (time frame unknown). In 2006, she appeared on the PBS program The New Medicine, hosted by Dana Reeve (who died of lung cancer the same year), in a segment that discussed the comfort level patients have when they are interacting with physicians, and how empowered they feel about talking to their physicians about health concerns.
