= Yolanda Hamilton =

Yolanda Hamilton may refer to:

- Yolanda Hamilton (The Young and the Restless)
- Yolanda Hamilton (footballer) (born 1987), Jamaican footballer
