= List of The Young and the Restless characters introduced in the 2000s =

This is a list of notable characters from the CBS soap opera The Young and the Restless that significantly impacted storylines and debuted between January 2000 and December 2004, in order of first appearance.

== Alex Perez ==
Alex Perez
- The Young and the Restless character
- Portrayed by: Alexia Robinson
- Duration: 2000–02
- First appearance: November 29, 2000
- Last appearance: May 9, 2002
- Created by: Kay Alden; Trent Jones
- Introduced by: Edward J. Scott

Alex Perez first appeared on November 29, 2000, later becoming the fiancée of Malcolm Winters and lover of his brother, Neil. The role, portrayed by Alexia Robinson, was created to fill the void left by Victoria Rowell. Prior to her debut, the character was only known as "Erin". In 2002, it was announced that Robinson was to exit The Young and the Restless after the expiration of her contract, and departed onscreen on May 9, 2002.

History
Alex arrived in Genoa City to work on an important case for Newman Enterprises and the firm's boss Victor Newman was immediately impressed by the way she was doing business. She was working together with Neil Winters and the attraction between them was high even though they were constantly fighting. Olivia Winters helped Alex win the case however, the two were never friends because Olivia was constantly afraid of losing Neil to Alex.

Meanwhile, Neil's brother Malcolm Winters fell for Alex and they started dating. Neil was extremely bothered by this because he was in love with Alex and he was about to reveal the truth when Alex finally decided to accept Malcolm's proposal of marriage. Alex desperately tried to hide any sign of involvement with Neil, while Neil was going through a rough time due to a death of his close friend. In a moment of depression, Neil admitted his feelings for Alex to Malcolm, but Alex reassured Malcolm that she did not care for Neil, and the couple went back to planning their life together.

Malcolm, Alex and Neil ended up a trip to Kenya where Malcolm overheard Alex talking about her feelings for Neil, but did not hear that Alex decided to fully commit to Malcolm. Malcolm ended up in an accident, as Alex and Neil returned to Genoa City. They realized that Malcolm must have overheard their conversation and that's why he left. Alex decided to move back to Minneapolis after she wasn't able to deal with the guilt.

== Sean Bridges ==
Sean Bridges
- The Young and the Restless character
- Portrayed by: Christopher Douglas (2001); David Lee Russek (2001–02)
- Duration: 2001–02
- First appearance: March 20, 2001
- Last appearance: July 1, 2002
- Created by: Kay Alden; Trent Jones
- Introduced by: Edward J. Scott
In-universe information
- Occupation: Former jabot cosmetics website designer

Sean Bridges first appeared on March 20, 2001, portrayed by Christopher Douglas. He would later become a prominent boyfriend of both Phyllis Summers and Jill Abbott. In July 2001, it was announced that Douglas had been let go from the role, and that it would be recast. The recast was "due more to the way that character had been written than the performer's work" and that the writers wanted to take the character in a different direction. He was last seen in the role on July 27, 2001. The role was recast with David Lee Russek, who debuted on August 6, 2001. In June 2002, it was announced that Russek was to exit in a "storyline dictated" departure, and was last seen on July 1, 2002.

I was caught in the middle of a power struggle between [executive producer Edward] Scott and [head writer Kay] Alden. Everyone at the show has been more than supportive of my situation, and I do realize that this decision has less to do with Chris Douglas, per say [sic] and more to do with a difference of opinion between an executive producer and head writer.

—Douglas on his firing from the soap opera (2001)

History
According to Sean, he dropped out of MIT as an 18-year-old junior, and began traveling the country for five years with a backpack as his only possession. He stopped long enough to get involved on the ground floor with a web company and made a killing on his stock options before the company made their down fall. He lived in a 35-room Long Island Victorian mansion, filled with great art, furniture from around the world, and all the "toys." When he realized that he was living to maintain his possessions instead of enjoying his life, he left it all behind and took a job in Genoa City. At some point along the way he had a relationship with Phyllis Summers.

Sean arrived in Genoa City coincidentally to replace Phyllis as Jabot Website Designer, complete with nose ring and laid back wardrobe. He lives in a high rise apartment with no furnishings but a card table, two chairs and a futon, in an attempt to return to a minimalist way of life from his younger years. But he does still keep a Picasso in the closet. Sean seems to have a lot of connections in his past, counting entertainers Lionel Richie and B.B. King among his friends.

The mysterious Sean seemed to have scoped out the options and chose "older woman" Jill Abbott as his companion. While Jill remained wary of this hot younger man and his motives, he managed to sweep her off her feet. Sean was a good influence on the embittered Jill, showing us a bit of the fun-loving innocent woman she once was. Sean moved into the Chancellor Estate and lived with Jill. But Sean pressured her to get married, and Jill balked one too many times. Sean quit Jabot and returned to New York City.

== Amanda Browning ==
Amanda Browning
- The Young and the Restless character
- Portrayed by: Denice Duff
- Duration: 2001–02
- First appearance: August 31, 2001
- Last appearance: July 5, 2002
- Created by: Kay Alden; Trent Jones
- Introduced by: David Shaughnessy
In-universe information
- Spouse: Ralph Hunnicutt (unknown dates)
- Children: Mackenzie Browning
- Grandsons: Dylan Hellstrom
- Granddaughters: Becca Hellstrom

Amanda Browning first appeared on August 31, 2001, as the mother of Mackenzie Browning, portrayed by Denice Duff. In June 2002, it was announced that Duff would exit The Young and the Restless after the expiration of her contract, departing onscreen on July 5, 2002.

History
Amanda Browning, and her former lover, Brock Reynolds, had a daughter together named Mackenzie. As part of her history, Amanda and Brock fell in love off screen while working together in India. The relationship ended when Amanda left the country with their baby. Amanda married Ralph, who abused Mackenzie. She did not believe her daughter, so Mac ran away.

In 2001, Amanda arrived in Genoa City looking for her daughter after Brittany Hodges set out looking to locate Mac's mother. After realizing the truth about the abuse, Amanda divorces Ralph and returns to town to become closer to her daughter again. She begins volunteering at the homeless shelter where Mac used to stay. Ralph tracks her down in Genoa City. Knowing she is close to Katherine Chancellor, Ralph takes advantage of this and blackmails Amanda into stealing things from the Chancellor house. Ralph's terrorizing of Amanda is stopped by Larry Warton, with whom Amanda has developed a relationship. Amanda chooses to leave town after Jill Abbott shows her the security camera footage of Amanda stealing jewels from the mansion and nearly getting people killed.

== Ralph Hunnicutt ==
Ralph Hunnicutt
- The Young and the Restless character
- Portrayed by: Angelo Tiffe (2001–02); Daniel Quinn (2002)
- Duration: 2001–02
- First appearance: December 7, 2001
- Last appearance: July 5, 2002
- Created by: Kay Alden; Trent Jones
- Introduced by: David Shaughnessy
In-universe information
- Spouse: Amanda Browning (unknown dates)
- Stepchildren: Mackenzie Browning

Ralph Hunnicutt first appeared on December 7, 2001, as the ex-husband of Amanda Browning, portrayed by Angelo Tiffe, who was last seen in the role on January 6, 2002. In March 2002, it was announced that the role had been recast with Daniel Quinn, who assumed the role on April 18, 2002, as his first daytime role. By June, it was announced that Quinn, along with Denice Duff, would exit in a storyline dictated departure. He was last seen on July 5, 2002.

History
Ralph was married to Amanda Browning and played stepfather to her daughter, Mackenzie. Amanda left Ralph when she found out that he was abusing Mac. Amanda did not believe her daughter at first; thus, Mac ran away from home to Genoa City. Amanda came to Genoa City to find Mac, resulting in her leaving Ralph. Angered, Ralph tracked Amanda down, and he began to stalk Mac. He started blackmailing Amanda into stealing things from the Chancellor mansion, where Mackenzie lived with her paternal grandmother, Katherine Chancellor. Mac was shocked to realize that Ralph was in town, and Mac's one-time love, Billy Abbott, jumped to her rescue when Mac came face-to-face with Ralph. Billy hit Ralph in the head, and he thought that he had killed him, but Ralph recovered. He then kidnapped Katherine, but Amanda's new boyfriend, Larry Warton, rescued her. Ralph had plans to get his revenge on Mac, but Larry stopped him in time. Ralph left town, and he was never seen again.

== Hank Weber ==
Hank Weber
- The Young and the Restless character
- Portrayed by: Sherman Augustus
- Duration: 2002–05
- First appearance: 2002
- Last appearance: August 11, 2005
- Created by: Kay Alden; Trent Jones
- Introduced by: David Shaughnessy
In-universe information
- Occupation: Police detective

Hank Weber was a detective who appeared in and around Genoa City, first seen in 2002 and last seen in 2005. The recurring role was portrayed by Sherman Augustus.

History
Detective Hank Weber arrived on the scene when Diane Jenkins was involved in a fire at the Abbott poolhouse. The fire was believed to be caused by Phyllis Abbott at the time but was revealed to be in fact caused by Diane. Detective Weber was seen in serious crimes on and off in Genoa City in the years following this incident.

== Anita and Frederick Hodges ==
Anita and Frederick Hodges
- The Young and the Restless character
- Portrayed by: Mitzi Kapture (Anita); John Martin (Frederick)
- Duration: 2002–05
- First appearance: August 14, 2002
- Last appearance: February 22, 2005
- Created by: Kay Alden; Trent Jones; John F. Smith
- Introduced by: David Shaughnessy
In-universe information
- Occupation: Banker (frederick)
- Spouse: 1966–present
- Children: Brittany Hodges
- Grandsons: Joshua Marsino

Anita and Frederick Hodges first appeared on August 14, 2002, as the parents of Brittany Hodges. Anita was portrayed by Mitzi Kapture, and Frederick by John Martin. They were last seen on February 22, 2005.

Anita and Frederick Hodges are the parents of Brittany. Their marriage was not going well because Anita needed more attention, and Frederick was more focused on his job as a banker. Anita had an affair with the young J.T. Hellstrom, who once dated Brittany. The affair caused a conflict with J.T. and his girlfriend at-the-time, Colleen Carlton. Meanwhile, Frederick sought comfort in the arms of Jill Abbott, but their relationship did not evolve. Frederick was the first family member to see Brittany stripping in Bobby Marsino's strip club. Neither Frederick nor Anita had much of a story aside from being included in their daughter's story lines. Both parents mostly disapproved of Brittany's relationship with Raul Guittierez, but they were not happy when she was dating Bobby either. Anita and Frederick were last seen in early 2005, when Brittany told them that she was pregnant; neither parent offered her any support. They then moved to New York City.

== Wesley Carter ==
Wesley Carter
- The Young and the Restless character
- Portrayed by: Ben Watkins
- Duration: 2002–04
- First appearance: August 26, 2002
- Last appearance: January 20, 2004
- Created by: Kay Alden; Trent Jones; John F. Smith
- Introduced by: David Shaughnessy
In-universe information
- Occupation: Psychiatrist

Wesley Carter first appeared on August 26, 2002. He later became the fiancé of Olivia Winters after being involved with her sister, Drucilla. He was portrayed by Ben Watkins.

History
When Drucilla Winters returned to Genoa City from Paris with her rebellious teenage daughter Lily, Dru's boyfriend Wesley, a psychiatrist, appeared when Lily called him to take her and Dru back to Paris. After Lily persuaded Wesley to fly out to Genoa City, Dru was surprised by Wesley's arrival. Wesley then met and introduced himself to Dru's ex-husband, Neil Winters, who was dealing with his alcoholism issue. Wesley tried to convince Neil to let Lily and Dru move back to Paris. During this time, Neil's companion, Serena, asked Wesley for help in keeping Neil and Dru apart. Wesley later told Neil about Serena's feelings for him. Wesley began questioning Dru about her feelings for Neil. When Neil insisted he and Dru should live together for Lily to have a sense of family, Wesley wasn't happy about the idea other than Lily having a real family; then, Wes proposed to Dru.

To keep Wesley out of his way of getting back with Dru, Neil asked Dru's sister, Olivia, to keep Wesley busy. Wesley started to realize the extent of Dru's feelings for Neil by the end of the year when she changed her mind about spending the holidays with Wesley in Paris. She later told him she and Lily were moving in with Neil. Even though he and Dru were growing apart, Wesley remained close with Lily and occasionally gave her advice for her problems. Wesley decided to stay in town despite his separation from Dru.

When Olivia and Wesley confided in each other about their relationship situations, they became close and began a romantic relationship. Afterwards, Wesley and Dru officially ended their relationship. Olivia was afraid of moving too fast with Wes, but he later surprised her with a candlelight dinner and explained he wanted a chance to be with her. Months later, Wesley proposed to a hesitant Olivia, who weeks later, finally accepted his proposal. While in town, Wesley helped Christine Blair by hypnotizing her after she presumably had killed Isabella Brana, who was actually alive. After a few months, Olivia and Wesley called off their engagement, and he moved back to Paris.

== Damon Porter ==
Damon Porter
- The Young and the Restless character
- Portrayed by: Keith Hamilton Cobb
- Duration: 2003–05
- First appearance: May 23, 2003
- Last appearance: May 23, 2005
- Created by: Kay Alden; John F. Smith
- Introduced by: David Shaughnessy; John F. Smith
In-universe information
- Spouse: Adrienne Markham
- Children: Elias Porter

Damon Porter first appeared on May 23, 2003, portrayed by Keith Hamilton Cobb. His casting in the role was announced in April 2003. Viewers reportedly accused the soap of using Cobb to fill the void left by Shemar Moore. In May 2005, it was announced that Cobb was to exit, departing onscreen on May 23, 2005.

Character history
Intending to live a life of solitude, chemist Damon Porter found himself going back on his word when he received a phone call from Drucilla Winters in 2003. Dru found out that Damon used to work for Satine Cosmetics, and she managed to bring him to work at her company, Jabot, much to the displeasure of Neil Winters, who tried to get Damon to work at his company, Newman Enterprises. At Jabot, Damon replaced Ashley Abbott, who went on maternity leave. She reluctantly allowed Damon to take her place. Damon was a calm man who refused to get involved in the war between Newman and Jabot, especially after Brad Carlton asked Damon to seduce Phyllis Abbott, the wife of Jabot employee Jack Abbott. Phyllis and Damon were attracted to each other, and they shared a kiss even though Phyllis was married to Jack.

Drucilla was also attracted to Damon, but he did not seem to care for her. She then moved on to Neil Winters, where she found true love. One night, Damon shared a private conversation with Victoria Newman, who poured her heart out to him, only to realize later that Damon was the new chemist for her family's greatest rival. Victoria's family was against their relationship, but Victoria and Damon began to get closer. Damon was also getting close to Vanessa Lerner, his old girlfriend. He traveled to Japan with Vanessa to find a rare orchid that could help Jabot. He found himself sharing the trip with Dru and Neil, who were going to get married, and Jack and Sharon Newman, who went along with the couple. Phyllis broke up with Jack after a fight over the orchid, and she started a relationship with Damon. Vanessa was upset over Damon's relationship with Phyllis, and she decided to give her project to Newman. Damon was fired by Jack after learning about his relationship with Phyllis, but his sister, Ashley Abbott, rehired Damon.

Damon helped Phyllis cope with her problems, but even he wasn't perfect. Phyllis' son, Daniel Romalotti, had just arrived in town. He didn't tolerate Damon, and he preferred to spend his time with Jack. Damon's fights with Daniel helped him open up to Phyllis about his past. Years earlier, Damon's young son, Elias, was murdered by Dominic Hughes with a bullet that was intended for Damon. Since then, Damon had been meditating to find inner peace. The animosity between Damon and Daniel wore off after Damon had saved Daniel and his friend, Kevin Fisher, from a thug named Alex that was blackmailing them.

Phyllis visited Dominic Hughes in prison in hopes of keeping him away from Damon, who was keen on getting revenge one day. Dominic, however, showed up in Genoa City claiming to be a changed man, which even Damon believed, but Phyllis discovered that Dominic was setting up Damon, and she went to confront him. Dominic tried to rape Phyllis, but she was saved by Damon, who was then shot by Dominic. Damon injured Dominic with a sword, and they both ended up in the hospital. Damon's spirit left his body at the hospital, and he reunited with his son, but then he had to go back. Phyllis and Damon were under investigation for a possible murder, and they had to find a way to free themselves. Phyllis even contacted her sworn enemy, Christine Blair, to help them, but Christine accepted only after Daniel asked her to. Dominic managed to get the upper hand on Christine, so Phyllis hired Michael Baldwin to defend her, and both Phyllis and Damon were cleared of all charges. Damon reunited with his ex-wife, Adrienne Markham, and they moved to Atlanta together in 2005.

== Bobby Marsino ==
Bobby Marsino
- The Young and the Restless character
- Portrayed by: John Enos III
- Duration: 2003–05
- First appearance: June 9, 2003
- Last appearance: August 10, 2005
- Created by: Kay Alden; Trent Jones; John F. Smith
- Introduced by: David Shaughnessy; John F. Smith
In-universe information
- Other names: Charles Robert Cassen
- Occupation: CEo of marsino's (marilyn's) strip nightclub
- Parents: Elizabeth Anne Cassen; Robert Patrick Cassen
- Siblings: Joshua Cassen
- Spouse: Brittany Hodges (2005)
- Children: Joshua Marsino
- Aunts and uncles: Betty Marsino; Al Marsino

Bobby Marsino first appeared on June 9, 2003, portrayed by John Enos III. In June 2005, it was announced that Enos was to exit the soap due to budget cuts, departing onscreen on August 10, 2005.

Character history
Bobby Marsino entered the series as the owner of the strip club, Marsino's. He gave Brittany Hodges a job at the club, allowing her to sing and eventually strip. Brittany's new occupation caused problems in her relationship with her boyfriend, Raul Guittierez. He attempted to get the club shut down with the help of Brittany's father, Fredrick Hodges. Brittany was electrocuted and scarred by one of Bobby's business associates out of revenge for her father and boyfriend's actions against the strip club. Bobby, who developed feelings for Brittany, was there for her after the incident. He turned his associates in to the police, and he eventually married Brittany.

Bobby's past was brought into light after a body was discovered behind the Genoa City Rec Center. The body was that of Joshua Cassen, who was childhood friends with Nikki Newman. Joshua and Nikki were fighting over Nikki's father's gun, and it went off by accident, killing Joshua. Nikki's father buried the body until it was found many years later. When Nikki tried to find Joshua's family, she discovered that Bobby was actually Charlie Cassen, the younger brother of Joshua Cassen. Eventually, Bobby found out what happened to his brother, and Nikki and Bobby grew close after their revelation. Brittany, meanwhile, was pregnant, and she gave birth to a baby boy. They named their son Joshua Marsino, after Bobby's late older brother. Brittany had many complications during her pregnancy, and to pay for the medical bills, Bobby got involved with the mob. When the mob tried to recruit him, he found evidence to incriminate the members that he knew of, and he was forced to go into the Witness Protection Program. Brittany and Joshua were going to join Bobby in the Witness Protection Program once Joshua was in good health, but Bobby died in a hit and run accident in 2005, before they could reunite as a family.

== Cameron Kirsten ==
Cameron Kirsten
- The Young and the Restless character
- Portrayed by: Linden Ashby
- Duration: 2003–2004, 2023–2025
- First appearance: November 21, 2003
- Last appearance: January 27, 2025
- Created by: Kay Alden, Trent Jones and John F. Smith
- Introduced by: William J. Bell, David Shaughnessy and John F. Smith (2003); Josh Griffith (2023)
In-universe information
- Occupation: Owner of Kirsten Corporation

Cameron Kirsten first appeared on November 21, 2003, portrayed by Linden Ashby. Ashby departed from the role on August 12, 2004. After nearly twenty years, Ashby reprised the role on May 26, 2023. Ashby departed a month later when Cameron was killed off in the episode that aired on June 16 of that year. In 2024, Ashby was shortlisted for the Daytime Emmy Award for Outstanding Guest Performer in a Drama Series for his role as Cameron. On July 30, 2024, it was announced that Ashby would reprise the role of Cameron, beginning August 1, 2024, and exited once more on January 27 of the following year.

In 2003, when Sharon Newman fled Genoa City after kissing Victor Newman, she went to Denver to find herself. While in a bar, she met Cameron Kirsten, and he instantly fell in love with her. He followed her up to her motel room, offering her wine all the while. They had sex, and apparently, immediately afterwards he started abusing her by punching her in the face and trying to suffocate her with a pillow. However, before he could finish the beating, he fell asleep. Given this chance of escape, Sharon left Denver and came back to her family in Genoa City.

A year after these events, Cameron came to Genoa City to do a business deal with Newman Enterprises, Victor's company, now turned over to Nick Newman, Sharon's husband. While he was there, Cameron taunted and threatened Sharon, telling her that he would reveal to Nick what happened in Denver the year before unless she gave in to his wishes. Cameron then announced that he was planning a New Year's party and wanted Sharon to help him with it. Sharon said that she definitely would not do this, but, as Cameron had already told Nick about the party, there was nothing she could do. During the party, Cameron wrote down the address of a motel on the south side of Genoa City on the back of one of his business cards. He then gave it to Sharon, telling her that he wanted to meet her there after the party was over. Sharon felt that she had no choice but to do this, seeing as Cameron could tell Nick about Denver at any time.

After putting a long, black hooded coat on to disguise herself, Sharon went to the motel, apparently known as the Seedy Side. Once she got there, she met Cameron and told him that nothing would ever happen between them again, and that she wanted each of them to go their separate ways and forget all about Denver. Cameron, infuriated, started to beat her up again, pushing her onto the bed. Sharon then kicked him and sent him sprawling to the floor. As he tried to get up, Sharon looked for any sort of weapon she could find. Seeing an opened champagne bottle, she grabbed it and walked over to Cameron. He looked up, horrified, to see the bottle she was holding, and brought up a hand to try to shield himself from the blow that would undoubtedly come, but it was too late. The champagne bottle came crashing down on his head.

Sharon thought he was dead, but he was only knocked unconscious. So, Sharon dragged him out behind a dumpster in the alley. A few hours later, Cameron awakened, snow-covered and angrier than he had ever been in his life. After he got up, Cameron returned, his face bleeding, to his "stand-in Sharon" lover, Grace Turner, who had been there the whole time. Grace then attended to Cameron's wounds, and right there Cameron vowed to take his revenge on Sharon for almost killing him. And so, for the next few months, Cameron put on makeup and pretended that he was his own ghost, haunting Sharon by looking into her windows, chasing her in her house on the Newman ranch and even kissing her. All the while, Sharon believed that she was going insane, seeing gruesome hallucinations of the man she thought she killed.

Finally, she couldn't take it anymore, and went into the sewer, where Larry Warton had put "Cameron's" body after finding it in her car while she was trying to move it to see the body, and make sure that Cameron was really dead. She actually did find a body, but it, of course, wasn't Cameron's. For some strange reason, Cameron actually had killed Frank Barritt, the biological father of Sharon's daughter Cassie; apparently, for the sole purpose of driving Sharon out of her mind.

At the Mother's Day Brunch at the Genoa City Athletic Club, Cameron made the fact that he was alive known, surprising not only Sharon but also Nick and Nikki Newman, who, at this point, thought that Cameron was dead for sure, although the former had no idea that Sharon could have been involved in the disappearance, as Sharon had told Nikki of her ordeal. When asked about his whereabouts, Cameron made up a fake story about finding an old girlfriend of his in a bar and flying away with her to an island in the Caribbean. When Sharon confronted him later on, Cameron denied that the events of New Year's Eve even occurred.

Later on, Cameron arrived at the Newman ranch to give Nick a job offer; to be the COO of Kirsten Incorporated. Cameron even said that sooner or later, he might hand the entire company over to Nick, as at the time, didn't think he wouldn't have any heirs. Nick said he'd think about the offer. Upon hearing about this, Sharon decided that she would tell Nick about everything that had happened between her and Cameron. Immediately going to Cameron's hotel suite, Nick demanded that Grace tell him everything. She said that she didn't know what he was talking about, and wondered why he believed the lies that Sharon had told him. Before leaving, Nick punched Cameron in the face, and told him that that was for what he did to Sharon in Denver.

Nick then repeatedly came to the hotel suite and tried to interrogate Cameron, but to no avail. Near the end of his stay in Genoa City, Sharon began to visit him and it was only then that he started to open up. During one of those visits, he told her about his mother and father and his history, which he had never told anyone before. When asked if there was anything he could do to help her escape murder charges for killing Frank, as the body had been found by now and Sharon was the prime suspect, he said that the only way it was possible was if she would be with him the rest of his life; and fly in his jet to one of the islands he owned. That way, she couldn't be brought back to the United States to face the criminal charges. Faced with no other choice, Sharon reluctantly accepted. She told Cameron that she would be ready to leave on the following night, but he said that that wasn't going to work. He told her that either they would leave then, or he would go it alone. Although Sharon wasn't expecting this, she went along with him to the airport and boarded the jet. Nicholas, however, was following them and somehow boarded his jet.

At one point during the flight, Sharon attempted to kill herself by jumping out of the door of the jet. Cameron restrained her and told her that she had so much to live for and that her life had just begun. He comforted her and held her in his arms. Sharon finally calmed down and returned to her seat. Just as Cameron tried to kiss Sharon, Nick rushed out of the curtain behind them and pushed Cameron to the floor. He delivered blow after blow to Cameron, who, at this point was too shocked by Nick's appearance to try to defend himself. Sharon jumped out of her seat and stood, watching in horror as the abuse continued.

Finally, Nick knocked Cameron unconscious and dragged him to the door, strapping a parachute onto him. He roughly pushed Cameron out of the jet, and he began his plummet to the ground. Meanwhile, in the jet, Nick strapped parachutes to him and Sharon too, and they followed Cameron. In the morning, Cameron awoke to find himself in a cornfield, where, incidentally, Nicholas and Sharon had also landed. When he woke up, Cameron had noticed a horrible pain in his right leg, but he didn't realize the severity of his wound until Nicholas tried to move the leg and Cameron screamed. Although they knew about this, Nicholas and Sharon forced Cameron to walk until they found civilization. If Cameron made any moves, Nicholas threatened to beat him with a large stick he found in the field.

As they walked down the dirt road, Nicholas and Sharon treated Cameron very cruelly, with Sharon even pushing him and telling him to move faster. Soon, they came upon a stand selling sweet corn, and there they called the police. Those police believed Nicholas and Sharon's story and put Cameron into a police car. Cameron Kirsten was last seen on the show being hauled away in that police car, with a look of cold fury and determination upon his face.

In May 2023, Sharon received a mysterious bottle of champagne, with a note which made her reminisce about the past. The champagne bottle had blood marks on it. Soon after, Sharon informed Nick of other gifts that she mysteriously received and that relate to Cameron, without any sender address or information. Concerned that the gifts are connected to Cameron, Sharon informs Detective Chance Chancellor of the mysterious gifts and their connection to her previous assailant, who then finds out that Cameron has indeed been released from prison. At that same moment, Cameron checks into the Athletic Club in Genoa City.

== Arthur Hendricks ==
Arthur Hendricks
- The Young and the Restless character
- Portrayed by: David Hedison
- First appearance: January 20, 2004
- Last appearance: November 29, 2004
- Created by: Kay Alden; Trent Jones; John F. Smith
- Introduced by: David Shaughnessy; John F. Smith
In-universe information
- Occupation: Former judge
- Spouse: Eleanor Bartlett
- Sons: Tucker McCall
- Stepsons: Harrison Bartlett
- Grandsons: Devon Hamilton

Arthur Hendricks appeared from January 20 to November 29, 2004, as an ex-lover of Katherine Chancellor, portrayed by David Hedison.

History
In her early days, Katherine Chancellor had an affair with her husband's golfing partner, Arthur Hendricks, which resulted in a pregnancy. Kay had a baby, whom she gave away for adoption and later was thought to be Jill Abbott (Jess Walton). In early 2004, Arthur came to Genoa City to visit Kay, and Jill hoped that Arthur would find a way to give Katherine hope for life, being that she was in a downward spiral of alcoholism at that time. Arthur moved into the Chancellor Mansion and got to know his "daughter" better. Arthur, along with several other family members, did an intervention to prevent Kay from drinking anymore, which eventually helped her realize that she needed to go to rehab.

Arthur and Kay became closer again after all of the time that they spent apart. Arthur planned to propose to Kay, but his stepson, Harrison Bartlett, came into town during that time, claiming that Arthur had killed his mother, Eleanor Hendricks, to get his hands on her fortune. Arthur was investigated in the case, but he was never charged. Jill and Kay confronted Arthur about his stepson, but Arthur did not want to get into it. He just said that Harrison had a big hand in ruining his life. Kay decided to trust Arthur and marry him, but he wasn't able to handle the suspicious minds, so he decided to leave town, which prompted yet another feud between Kay and Jill.

While Arthur was still out of town, it was discovered that Jill was not Kay and Arthur's daughter. It later came out that Arthur and Katherine's baby was actually a boy; Tucker McCall (Stephen Nichols). Arthur also has a grandson Devon Hamilton (Bryton James).

== Tom Fisher ==
Tom Fisher
- The Young and the Restless character
- Portrayed by: Jonathan Fraser (2004); Roscoe Born (2005–09)
- Duration: 2004–06; 2009
- First appearance: April 9, 2004
- Last appearance: April 8, 2009
- Created by: Kay Alden; Trent Jones; John F. Smith
- Introduced by: David Shaughnessy; John F. Smith
In-universe information
- Occupation: Con man Former carpenter
- Spouse: Gloria Bardwell (1976–2004)
- Children: Kevin Fisher; Ryder Callahan; Daisy Carter
- Grandchildren: Lucy Romalotti; Bella Fisher

Tom Fisher first appeared on April 9, 2004, as the abusive father of Kevin Fisher, initially portrayed by Jonathan Fraser. The role was then assumed by Roscoe Born on April 7, 2005, but within nine months, it was announced that Born was to exit the soap, with his last appearance on January 13, 2006.

History

Roscoe Born portrayed Tom Fisher from 2005 to 2006, with a reappearance in 2009

The infamous Terrible Tom, the abusive father of Kevin Fisher and stepfather of Michael Baldwin, who had been violent towards them and their mother, Gloria Fisher, when they were young, arrived in Genoa City. Having learned that Kevin had won in the lottery, Tom visited his estranged son, hoping to scare him into giving him money. Kevin, who had dreaded his father's return for years, bravely told him to go away, but Tom promised he would return. Tom went to see Michael, who was now a highly successful lawyer, and asked for $10,000, in exchange for his leaving town. Michael reluctantly agreed, threatening to kill him if he ever returned.

The money didn't last long, and Tom soon came back, trying to embezzle more from Michael. When that was unsuccessful, Tom paid a visit to Gloria, who was now happily married to the wealthy John Abbott Sr. Gloria believed that Tom was dead, and realized that she is still legally married to him, invalidating her marriage to John. Tom threatened to tell John about this if she didn't pay him indefinitely. Fearful that the revelation could cause John to leave her, Gloria gave in and began to give Tom money, despite Michael's warnings not to.

Tom and Gloria legally ended their marriage, and John and Gloria remarried. John and his daughter, Ashley Abbott, who Tom had been dating, found out that he was Gloria's abusive ex-husband and warned him to stay away from their family. When Gloria refused to pay him anymore, Tom threatened to kill John, so Gloria kept giving him money, being careful not to let John find out.

Tom met psychotic Sheila Carter, whom he knew only as the alias Brenda Harris. They teamed up to exact revenge on the Abbotts and on Michael and his fiancé, Lauren Fenmore, who Sheila had wanted dead for years. Sheila told Tom that her plan was to kidnap Lauren on her honeymoon with Michael and then ransom her. However, her real plan was much more sinister; Sheila planned to kill Lauren and Tom. Upon learning of his ally's deception, Tom saved Lauren's life and dragged her to safety when her honeymoon yacht exploded.

Lauren was presumed dead, but was actually stranded in a bomb shelter with Sheila and Tom. Tom had both women tied up in the shelter, and decided to go back to Genoa City to extort money from Gloria in return for Lauren's safe return. While Gloria agreed to meet Tom, Ashley instead headed to meet Tom in an alley, but John, who overheard Tom's phone call to Gloria, got there first and shot Tom. Tom was taken to the hospital and, with his last strength, tried to tell an angry Michael and Kevin that Lauren was not dead, but died before he could do so. The doctors tried to revive him, but to no avail and it was the classic blanket over the head. Days later, Paul Williams arrived at the bomb shelter and rescued Lauren, who had managed to work with Sheila to escape. However, Sheila fell behind and disappeared once again. John was sentenced to seven years in prison for killing Tom, where he resided until his death from a stroke in August of that year. After John's death, it was revealed that Tom and Gloria's divorce was never finalized, therefore again invalidating Gloria and John's second marriage.

Three years after his death, Kevin saw a ghost of Tom and said goodbye and good riddance to him. Kevin then had him cremated and the ashes down Michael's sink. A safe deposit box key was one of the few things Tom left to Kevin in his will, though neither he nor Michael could determine where the box was located.

Years after Tom's death, it was revealed that his affair with Sheila had resulted in the birth of twins; Daisy Carter and Ryder Callahan.

== Dominic Hughes ==
Dominic Hughes appeared from October 14, 2004, to January 25, 2005, as a nemesis of Damon Porter. He was portrayed by Kevin Alejandro.

History
Damon Porter and his son, Elias Porter, lived in Atlanta, Georgia. Elias loved horses and wanted to be an Olympic champion. Damon and Elias had been riding horses, stopped at a fast food joint and were eating their burgers when they were harassed by some street kids. Damon put them straight. As he was using the encounter as a lesson to Elias on the way home in the car, a car drove up and Dominic Hughes fired a shot. The shot meant for Damon hit Elias and the boy died in his father's arms.

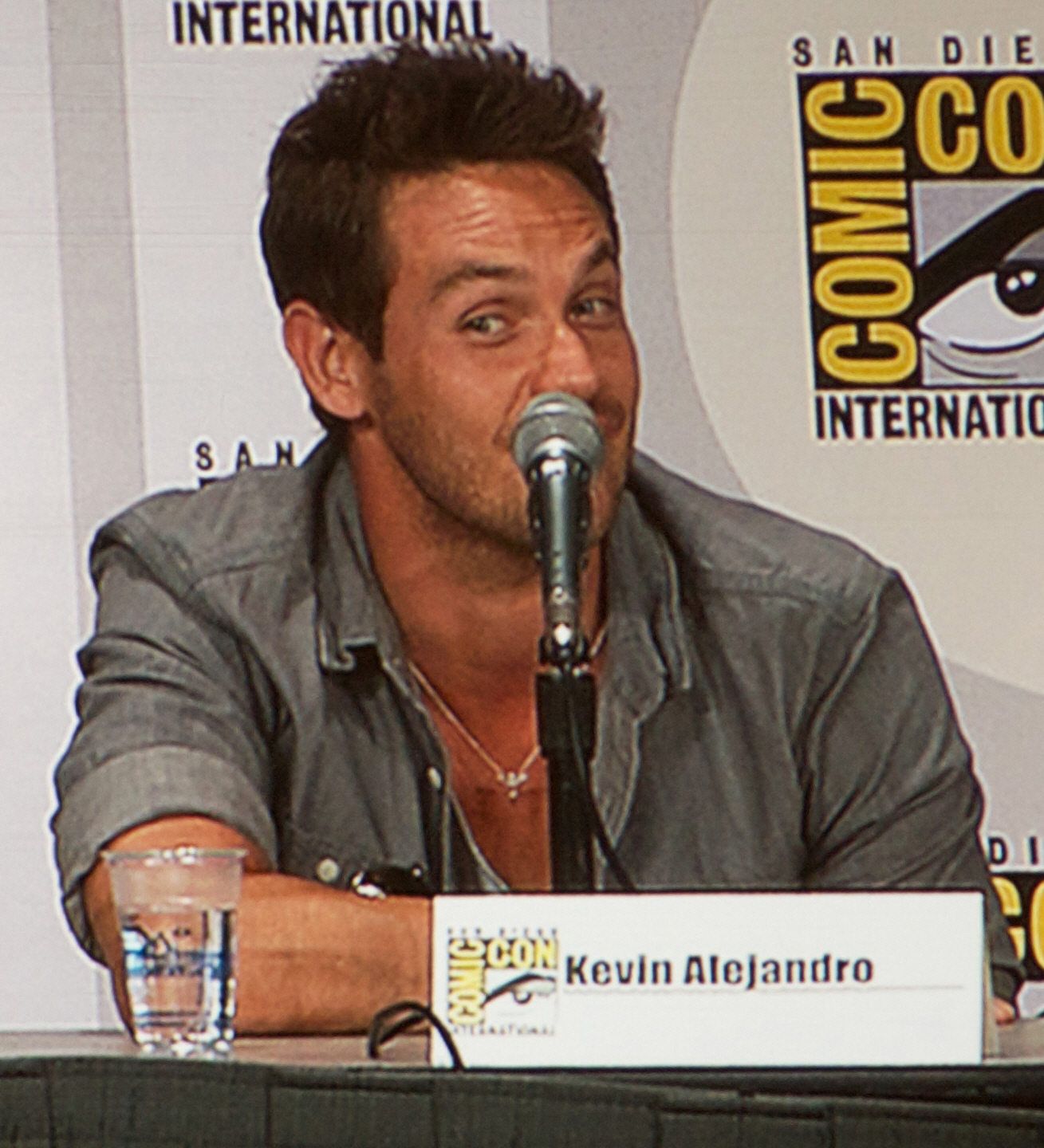
Kevin Alejandro portrayed the devious Dominic Hughes.

Damon changed, bought a gun and was consumed with revenge hunting down his killer. Hughes was finally captured, tried, convicted and sent to prison but the rage was still there for Damon. He wasn't there for his grieving wife, Adrienne Markham, and she couldn't bear to be around him so they were divorced. Years later, reality finally set in that mourning wouldn't bring Elias back. Damon learned to build a facade of control through meditation to cover the rage that was always still there.

In 2004, Damon got word that Hughes was up for parole and began spending his time contemplating his Samurai sword so Damon's girlfriend, Phyllis Summers, visited Hughes in prison to warn him to stay away because Damon still wanted to kill him. Dominic told her he already knew that Damon lived in Genoa City and he fully intended to head there upon his release. He claimed he was born again and had to see Damon to plead for his forgiveness. Phyllis left and Dominic sneered behind her back.

Dominic got paroled and showed up in Genoa City immediately. Phyllis met him and brought him to Damon hoping to help Damon keep his cool. Damon didn't believe a word until Dominic showed him the tattoo on his inner arm in memory of Elias. Later Damon felt sorry for the guy spending his parole money on a trip to see him so he sent Phyllis to deliver some cash to Dominic. As Phyllis approached his motel room door, another thug was leaving discussing a heist they were going to pull and how they had suckered Damon.

Phyllis made a call on her cell phone then daringly burst into Dominic's room. Dominic pulled a gun and threw her on the bed intending to rape her. Damon broke down the door wielding his Samurai sword. Hughes was knocked down and his gun flew across the floor. Phyllis convinced Damon not to kill him but, when she stepped between them, Hughes went for the gun. Damon jumped between them as Hughes fired and Damon took the bullet. With a last surge of rage, Damon ran Dominic through with the sword.

Both were rushed to the hospital where Phyllis said to Dominic that she wishes he'll die as his gurney passed. Damon was near death in the ER and his spirit left his body and stood by Phyllis as she frantically watched them work over him. The spirit of Elias appeared, told Damon it wasn't his time and to return to Phyllis who needed him. Elias forgave Damon for not protecting him and told Damon that he would always be in Damon's heart. Damon lived. While still in the hospital recovering, Damon and Phyllis were questioned for suspicion of conspiracy to murder Dominic thanks to the lies Hughes told the Genoa City police.

Phyllis had to beg Christine Blair to represent her and, although Christine said no, Phyllis's son Daniel Romalotti talked her into taking the case. Phyllis decided it was time for drastic measures, dressed up as a man, got thrown in jail for drunk driving and attempted to get Dominic to confess. But Dominic recognized her. Phyllis was arrested then later Damon was arrested for conspiracy to commit attempted murder. Phyllis hired Michael Baldwin to be her lawyer instead. Things were looking bleak so Phyllis pulled another disguise as Atlanta reporter Sandra King.

Her interview questions of District Attorney Glenn Richards helped him doubt that the felon Dominic was telling the truth. Paul Williams called Hank Weber into his office to talk to him about Damon's case. Paul wondered if Hank was as gung-ho about going after Damon as Glenn was. Later, Hank met Glenn at the Genoa City Athletic Club's restaurant to tell him that Dominic wasn't changing his story. When Michael walked up to the two men, Glenn spotted "Saundra," Phyllis's alter ego, talking to Christine.

Michael pretended not to know what was going on and, as Glenn complained about the publicity she could cause, Hank said there was something about "Saundra" he wasn't buying. Michael took over the case and broke Dominic's story in questioning before the DA and the charges against Damon and Phyllis were dropped. By 2005, Dominic left Genoa City.

== Yolanda Hamilton ==
Yolanda Hamilton
- The Young and the Restless character
- Portrayed by: Chene Lawson (2005–2006, 2023–2024); Debbi Morgan (2011–2012)
- Duration: 2005–2006; 2011–2012; 2023–2024
- First appearance: June 30, 2005
- Last appearance: November 13, 2024
- Created by: Kay Alden and John F. Smith
- Introduced by: John F. Smith (2005); Maria Arena Bell (2011); Josh Griffith (2023)
In-universe information
- Other names: Harmony Hamilton
- Occupation: Receptionist at restless style magazine/webzine former waitress at a milwaukee diner worked in the jabot mailroom
- Sisters: Tyra Hamilton (adoptive)
- Sons: Devon Hamilton
- Daughters: Ana Hamilton
- Grandsons: Dominic Chancellor-Newman

Yolanda Hamilton (also Harmony Hamilton) first appeared on June 30, 2005, as the biological mother of Devon Hamilton, and later Ana Hamilton. The role was originated by Chene Lawson until January 24, 2006. The character later returned on October 7, 2011, portrayed by Debbi Morgan, who remained until her firing the following year. She made her onscreen exit on October 30, 2012. All My Children actress Debbi Morgan confirmed via her official website that she would be joining the cast of The Young and the Restless. The actress expressed her excitement about joining the new role, and it was good to play another character other than her All My Children iconic character, Angie Hubbard for a change. She also denied rumors that she would be resurrecting the role of Drucilla Winters (Victoria Rowell).

On what to expect with the character upon her return in an interview with TV Guide, Morgan stated "She has no idea what's been happening with Devon – that his father, Tucker [Stephen Nichols], is the son of Katherine Chancellor [Jeanne Cooper]." Morgan jokingly stated in addition, "Who knows? Maybe Harmony will turn out to be the black Erica Kane! People have already been connecting the dots and are assuming that Harmony will wind up with Neil (Kristoff St. John)." A commercial aired promoting Morgan's joining The Young and the Restless. In September 2012, Morgan confirmed on Twitter that she had been let go from the soap. She taped her final scenes on October 5, exiting onscreen on October 30.

In April 2023, it was announced Lawson would reprise the role, beginning May 5.

When Devon Hamilton finally gained enough courage to see his homeless mother, Yolanda, he found her living in a park, anorexic and dirty, addicted to drugs. It was revealed that any money she earned she spent on drugs. She explained to Devon that she would never accept any ones money (including his) due to her addiction. She told Devon to return to Genoa City, and he did. Devon occasionally would go back and check on his troubled mother. She refused time and time again to go to a rehab facility. Yolanda later went to live with Devon and his adoptive parents, Neil and Drucilla. She stole a watch from Neil and sold it to buy drugs. She later attended rehab and got a job at Jabot Cosmetics. She came on to Neil, and later left Genoa City due to her troubled ways.

Years later, (Yolanda had not been seen) however Devon found out he had a sister (Yolanda's daughter) Ana Hamilton, who Yolanda gave to her adoptive sister Tyra Hamilton to raise due to her drug addiction. Later, Yolanda had contacted Genoa City wanting custody of Ana back due to her cleaning her act, however never acted on this. Years later, it was revealed that Tucker McCall (a wealthy businessman) had a son, and around this time it was revealed that Yolanda had written a letter to her "lover" from years ago. Katherine Chancellor (Tucker's mother) hired Paul Williams to find her grandson. It was revealed that Devon in fact was Tucker's son, and Yolanda and Tucker had an affair twenty years prior, and Tucker had forgotten. He referred to Yolanda as "Candy Cane" during their affair.

Yolanda came back to Genoa City five years later under the alias Harmony Hamilton. When news broke that Tucker was Devon's biological father, she returned to Genoa City to support her son. She came face to face with Tucker for the first time since she was pregnant with Devon. After a confrontation with Devon, Harmony claimed she was leaving town because her son didn't want her in Genoa City any longer.

Still, Harmony surfaced again when she arrived to see Tucker renew his wedding vows to Ashley Abbott. Neil caught Harmony before she could enter the church, and he told her that it wasn't her place to be at the wedding and that she should leave. Soon after, Harmony was invited to have Thanksgiving dinner with Katherine Chancellor. Although Jill Abbott Fenmore strongly disliked Harmony's presence in her house, Katherine encouraged her to stay. Katherine's generosity ruined her chances of reconciling with her son. He stopped by with a peace offering of red hot candies because he knew that they were both his and her favorite. He told her that for Devon to accept him, he needed to accept her. While their reunion was taking place, Tucker saw Harmony in Katherine's house and became enraged that Katherine was using Harmony to get to Devon.

With Harmony's constant presence in Genoa City, she began to grow on Neil, Devon and Tucker. She organized the Children's Christmas Pageant, which pleasantly surprised Devon, where she got to reunite with her daughter. He started to appreciate her effort to get to know him better. In addition, Neil apologized for being so rude to Harmony when they ran into each other after Neil's wedding to Sofia Dupre. Tucker also apologized to Harmony for his rude behavior upon her return to Genoa City. Harmony persuaded both Devon and Tucker to talk to Katherine after she told them how pure and kind she was. Both Neil and Harmony began to have increasing romantic feelings for each other, despite his marriage to Sofia, who began to see the connection between the two. Harmony also began a friendship with Sarge, a physiotherapist. However, after Ashley left Tucker during an argument, he got drunk and fell into bed with Harmony in which Ashley walked in on them, leaving her guilt ridden, especially when Katherine then told her to leave her house; Katherine came to her senses and said she could stay. After Neil confessed his true feelings for Harmony to Sofia, they decided to divorce. After it was finalized, Neil asked Harmony out on a real date, and they pursued a relationship. However, it ended when Harmony announced she was leaving Genoa City to help daughter Ana in another town.

In 2023, Harmony returned to Genoa City for Neil Winters’ memorial service at the Jazz Lounge in the Genoa City Athletic Club. Upon Harmony's arrival, Ashley Abbott felt a bit uncomfortable seeing her considering all that had happened the last time she was in town, but ended up reconciling with her. Harmony then apologized to Neil's immediate family for not attending his funeral and gave her condolences.

== William Bardwell ==
William Bardwell
- The Young and the Restless character
- Portrayed by: Ted Shackelford
- Duration: 2006–07
- First appearance: February 2, 2006
- Last appearance: July 18, 2007
- Created by: Kay Alden; John F. Smith
- Introduced by: John F. Smith
In-universe information
- Siblings: Jeffrey Bardwell
- Wife: Miranda Montgomery (1992–97); Gloria Bardwell (2007)
- Nieces: Chelsea Lawson
- Other relatives: Connor Newman

William Bardwell first appeared on February 2, 2006, portrayed by former Knots Landing star Ted Shackelford. His run lasted until July 18, 2007, when the character died after complications from a stroke. Weeks later, Shackelford returned to portray William's identical twin brother, Jeffrey Bardwell.

History
In 2006, John Abbott Sr. finally remembered what happened the night Tom Fisher was shot. He went to D.A. Will Bardwell to tell him the truth to free his daughter, Ashley Abbott, who was taking the blame for his crime. John told Will that he was the one who shot and killed Tom Fisher. Will thought that John was lying, but a lie detector test proved him wrong. John was then sentenced to seven years in prison. Will then moved on to investigate the tainted Glo-Again face cream, which resulted in a consumer death. Since no new evidence and leads were found, the case became cold.

In 2006, Jill Abbott decided to join an online dating agency, and she was shocked to discover that Will was her anonymous date. Will's wife, Miranda, a well-known fashion editor, had died several years earlier. Jill was his first physical relationship after his wife's death. Will was involved in a love triangle between Jill and Gloria Bardwell, whom he met at a grieving spouse support group. Gloria's husband was John Abbott, who had recently died of a stroke. Gloria's interest in Will was certainly strengthened by her knowledge that he was the sole heir to a multibillion-dollar oil fortune.

In 2007, William and Gloria were married. Soon after, new evidence arose in the Glo-Again scandal, and most of Jabot Cosmetics employees were subject to DNA testing. Will suspected that Gloria was the culprit. She was very hesitant to give a DNA sample for the case. After much persuasion, Gloria finally gave her DNA sample. She got her son (Kevin Fisher) to get a fake sample. Upon handing her sample over, she performed a sleight of hand trick, switching her sample with the fake. Of course, her test came back negative. However, when dining out, William watched Gloria's friend, Evan Owen, do the same trick. He discovered his wife's secret, and he set out to prove the truth. Upon meeting Gloria at the Athletic Club, William staged a hug in which his watch got caught in her hair. Pulling the hairs he needed for her DNA sample, he ran the test anonymously; it was positive.

Will confronted Gloria with the test results, and she admitted her secret to him. During their argument, Will suffered a stroke. While he was in hospital, Gloria's other son, Michael Baldwin, and Kevin were able to get Gloria's test results. An unknown copy, however, remained at the lab, where Detective Maggie Sullivan found it. She then took over William's cases, and she was determined to find out who was the positive match. William died of complications from the stroke. Shortly after, Gloria found a letter saying that Will's uncle's company had recently left $50 million to him, which was then given to Gloria. She decided to use some of the money to throw him a wonderful celebration of his life. At his wake, his identical twin brother, Jeffrey Bardwell, arrived to express his condolences to Gloria. He regretted not spending more time with his brother.

== Carmen Mesta ==
Carmen Mesta
- The Young and the Restless character
- Portrayed by: Marisa Ramirez
- Duration: 2006–07
- First appearance: May 8, 2006
- Last appearance: February 17, 2007
- Created by: Lynn Marie Latham; Kay Alden; John F. Smith
- Introduced by: Lynn Marie Latham
In-universe information
- Other names: Carmen Jones
- Occupation: Public relations representative
- Siblings: Antonio Mesta
- First cousins: Ines Varges

Carmen Mesta first appeared on May 8, 2006, portrayed by former General Hospital actress Marisa Ramirez. The Young and the Restless has issued a casting call and by April 11, 2006, it was announced that Ramirez had secured the role as "Carmen, a businesswoman whose storyline would be tied to Jack Abbott." She filmed her first scenes on April 4. By September 2006, it was announced that Carmen was to depart only four months after a debut. The show cited a lack of chemistry between her and her co-star, Kristoff St. John (as Neil Winters). The character was found murdered on October 27, 2006, and a "Who Killed Carmen Mesta?" storyline followed. Carmen's killer was Jana Hawkes (Emily O'Brien), who was initially never considered a suspect.

History
Carmen is a freelance public relations consultant that Katherine Chancellor hires for Jabot Cosmetics in 2006 because of Jack Abbott's handling of a scandal that results from Jabot's test release of tainted face cream. Jack resents her involvement but soon becomes attracted to her and eventually he and Carmen have a one-night stand. Afterward, Carmen is hired by Victor Newman to work for Newman Enterprises' new cosmetics division, Beauty Of Nature.

While at Newman Enterprises, Carmen begins an emotional affair with Neil Winters, who is estranged from his wife Drucilla. The physical extent of Carmen's relationship with Neil is a kiss. Believing that the two are having an affair, Drucilla ransacks Carmen's room and cuts her clothing with scissors. Carmen has Drucilla arrested for aggravated burglary and gets a restraining order. Dru violates the restraining order on more than one occasion, even attacking Carmen in Newman Enterprises' break room. Unbeknownst to Dru, the attack is captured on a hidden video camera accidentally left on by Noah Newman. The footage is discovered by Dru's enemy Phyllis Newman, who alerts Carmen, who in turn takes the tape to the police, which lands Dru in more trouble.

During these events Neil helps Dru deal with her feelings towards Carmen and tries to act as peacemaker. Carmen can not understand how he can condone Dru's actions. She informs him she is going to ask the District Attorney William Bardwell to prosecute Dru. Neil believes that Carmen is overzealous in wanting revenge on Drucilla. Dru hires Michael Baldwin as her attorney, and Michael asks Paul Williams to investigate Carmen's background. Paul discovers that at Carmen's previous job, prior to her arrival in Genoa City, she had an affair with a married executive, and that she left the job after being paid a large settlement. Michael confronts Carmen with this information in an attempt to get her to drop her lawsuit against Dru, but she refuses. Carmen is found dead behind Neil's jazz club, Indigo, on the club's opening night. William Bardwell believes that she was murdered and, out of numerous possible suspects, arrests Devon for her murder. Michael becomes Devon's defense attorney and looks for other plausible suspects, particularly Brad Carlton and Jack, so that he can establish reasonable doubt as part of Devon's defense. Carmen's murderer turns out to be Jana Hawkes. Jana killed her because Carmen saw Jana looking through a folder containing pictures and facts about the Grugeon Reliquary, a fictional piece of medieval art with foreign letters engraved on it, revealed to be the keys to a massive fortune, which Jana stole from Victoria Newman's car.

== Rebecca Kaplan ==
Rebecca Kaplan
- The Young and the Restless character
- Portrayed by: Millie Perkins (2006); Lorna Raver (2006–07)
- Duration: 2006–07
- First appearance: July 28, 2006
- Last appearance: February 13, 2007
- Created by: Lynn Marie Latham; Kay Alden; John F. Smith
- Introduced by: Lynn Marie Latham
In-universe information
- Siblings: Isabel Montalcini
- Spouse: Arturo Kaplan
- Children: Brad Carlton; Stephanie Kaplan
- Grandchildren: Colleen Carlton; Abby Newman (adoptive)

Rebecca Kaplan first appeared on July 28, 2006, portrayed by Millie Perkins (known for her role in the film adaptation of The Diary of Anne Frank). By September 19, Lorna Raver at joined the role. The character wasn't seen past February 2007. Rebecca was introduced prior to her first appearance as "a woman who holds a key to the mystery of Brad's past." She is the mother of the late Brad Carlton and the grandmother of the late Colleen Carlton.

History
In 1943, Rebecca's family members were killed by Nazis during World War II, and Rebecca was put to work in a concentration camp, cataloging stolen Jewish artworks. Rebecca escaped and testified at war crime trials against the commandant, who was sentenced to death. She also returned all of the stolen artworks to their rightful owners. After receiving death threats, Rebecca and her sister, Isabel, immigrated from Rome to the United States, where Rebecca met and married Arturo "Arthur" Kaplan. The couple had two children, George and Stephanie, and the family lived in Ohio. When George and Stephanie were teenagers, the Nazis managed to track the Kaplan family down, and Arthur, Stephanie and Isabel were thus killed. The Nazis mistakenly took Isabel to be her sister, Rebecca, who was spared.

Later, Rebecca and George were forced to go on the run from the Nazis, and when George's friend, Brad Carlton, was killed, George took his identity and moved to Genoa City, with Rebecca still in hiding. In July 2006, "Brad," now in his forties, finally told his then-wife, Victoria Newman, and his daughter Colleen, about his past and his true identity, and introduced them to Rebecca, whom they had believed to be dead. Rebecca continues to stay in hiding, even during Brad's untimely death, when she could not leave hiding to come to his funeral.

== Adrian Korbel ==
Adrian Korbel
- The Young and the Restless character
- Portrayed by: Eyal Podell
- Duration: 2006–08
- First appearance: September 18, 2006
- Last appearance: August 5, 2008
- Created by: Lynn Marie Latham; Kay Alden; John F. Smith
- Introduced by: Lynn Marie Latham
In-universe information
- Occupation: Writer professor

Adrian Korbel first appeared on September 18, 2006, portrayed by Eyal Podell. He departed nearly two years later on August 5, 2008. He is described by the official website as ––

"An opinionated professor at Genoa City University, Adrian may have met his match in outspoken student Colleen Carlton."

The character has been described as a "Hunk" teacher. On his working with the cast, Podell said during an interview with Soap Opera Digest "It's fun, it's challenging. It's just great to come in and work." In a later September 2007 interview he talked about his character's status and the storylines at The Young and the Restless " It's been great. There's been a bit of a lull, but they've been setting up storylines. Adrian's still writing the book about Brad and somewhere in the future that's going to blow up. Then this thing with Heather could blow up things between him and Colleen."

History
Colleen Carlton found herself being drawn to her college art history professor, Adrian Korbel, and she became his research assistant in 2006. They started off on the wrong foot, but the two shared a one-night stand at Genoa City University when they were stuck there during an ice storm. A guilty Colleen decided to stop things with Adrian to salvage her relationship with her then-boyfriend, J.T. Hellstrom. Adrian seemed to move on from Colleen, and he became bed buddies with Amber Moore. Still, he found himself sketching pictures of Colleen, and he often reminisced about their night together during the storm. Meanwhile, Colleen's father, Brad Carlton, distrusted Adrian, and he hired J.T. to investigate Adrian. Brad's mother, Rebecca Kaplan, worked in a concentration camp cataloging stolen Jewish artwork during World War II. The Nazis who were involved began to track Rebecca and her family. They were looking for a piece of artwork, the Grudgeon Reliquary. After Brad acquired the artwork, Rebecca found an inscription in the artwork that was in code. Colleen gave the inscription to Adrian, and he solved the code that revealed a treasure worth millions hidden in the catacombs of the Czech Republic. Then, Jana Hawkes kidnapped Colleen and Kevin Fisher to get to the treasure before Brad. Luckily, JT and Adrian saved them from a fiery blaze before they were seriously hurt.

Adrian and Colleen resumed their secret relationship. Once Brad found out about his daughter's secret affair, he forbade her from seeing Adrian. Colleen was forced to move in with her uncle Jack Abbott, who also paid for her college tuition after her father cut her off. Adrian received a job offer at a museum in Paris, and he and Colleen were going to move to France together. Brad donated a piece of art to the museum, and he persuaded the museum to take back their job offer to Adrian. With nowhere to go, Colleen moved in with Adrian at his apartment while he wrote a tell-all about Brad's past. Jana and Colleen helped Adrian reveal the secrets of Brad's past. Colleen was unaware that by revealing her family's secrets, she was putting them in danger. Adrian gave Colleen an advanced copy of the book, entitled SAVED: From The Ashes. After reading the book, Colleen's fear for her family's safety escalated. She gave the book to her father, and he used his money to stop the book's publication. Adrian was furious with Colleen for betraying him, and their relationship soon crumbled. Colleen then left Genoa City for Beijing, China to take a work study position. Adrian was offered a position as a writer for Restless Style magazine, and he was in charge of writing an article about Victor Newman's most recent wife, Sabrina Costelana. Colleen's uncle, Jack Abbott, edited Adrian's work to increase magazine sales, which upset Adrian. Upon Colleen's return from China, Adrian was willing to forgive her, but she refused his advances. In 2008, Adrian relocated to Maine because he had no reason to stay in Genoa City any longer. In 2009, Collen tragically died after drowning in a lake. Adrian was unable to attend the funeral, but he sent flowers to the family to express his condolences.

== Ji Min Kim ==
Ji Min Kim
- The Young and the Restless character
- Portrayed by: Eric Steinberg
- Duration: 2006–07
- First appearance: October 2, 2006
- Last appearance: September 5, 2007
- Created by: Lynn Marie Latham; Kay Alden; John F. Smith
- Introduced by: Lynn Marie Latham

Ji Min Kim first appeared on October 2, 2006, portrayed by Eric Steinberg. He last appeared on September 5, 2007, after being murdered. On working with the cast, Steinberg said "Jess is one of the pillars of the show and this is the first soap I have ever done. I have done a lot of other things but not a soap. It is an extraordinarily, technically speaking as an actor, difficult."

History
Ji Min entered the picture as the owner of House of Kim, a dummy corporation that Jack Abbott had set up so that he could secretly buy back Jabot Cosmetics from Katherine Chancellor. Ji Min quickly became embroiled in the corporate intrigue surrounding Katherine, Jack and Victor Newman.

Ji Min had recently become interested in Jill Abbott, and was consistent in asking her out for drinks and meals. Gloria Bardwell, with the help of her son Kevin Fisher, had been monitoring the security cameras in Ji Min's office, determined to prove that Jack was the one pulling the strings at Jabot. Gloria had also been slipping Jill sexual enhancement drugs to ensure that she and Ji Min had sex in the office, thus destroying Jill's relationship with William Bardwell.

Although Gloria's plan ended any possibility of a Jill and William pairing, it also united Jill and Ji Min, who found they had an attraction to each other outside of a libido enhancer. Jill and Ji Min stumbled upon Gloria's scheme, when Jill's routine physical showed an abnormal amount of hormones. Ji Min, a self-professed chemist, and Jill figured out what Gloria had done and were last seen plotting their payback while at the Extreme Catwalk shoot. Jill spiked Gloria's and Evan's coffee, trying to do to her what she had done to them. Evan and Gloria did have a tryst, but unfortunately, William came by too late to catch them in the act. Katherine, Jill's mother and CEO of Chancellor Industries, was not a fan of Ji Min. Due to his involvement with Jack's Jabot scheme Katharine distrusted Ji Min and did not like his involvement with her daughter. Katherine bought Jabot back from Jack and wanted Ji Min to leave Genoa City. Although Ji Min confessed that he had always found his calling as that of an evil math teacher, he nevertheless stayed in town. Trying to make her daughter end her relationship with Ji Min, Katherine gave Jill an ultimatum: either she remained Jabot's CEO and gave up her relationship with Ji Min or she stepped down as CEO, which would allow Ji Min to be CEO, and therefore keep her man. Jill decided to keep her man. He proposed to Jill and the two were engaged. Katherine fired him from Jabot and he began working with Jill to start their own company, which would compete with Jabot.

Ji Min was found dead in his room at the Genoa City Athletic Club. The cause of death was strangulation; it was not known who the killer was, but evidence suggested that it was either Jack Abbott or Victor. Later video footage suggested it was Victor and he was arrested. In 2008, Paul Williams concluded that Ji Min had been murdered after discovering that Walter and David had mob connections. He had been silenced when he attempted to break free of their influence.

== Maggie Sullivan ==
Maggie Sullivan
- The Young and the Restless character
- Portrayed by: Tammy Lauren
- Duration: 2006–08
- First appearance: October 30, 2006
- Last appearance: February 21, 2008
- Created by: Lynn Marie Latham; Kay Alden; John F. Smith
- Introduced by: Lynn Marie Latham
In-universe information
- Occupation: Police detective

Maggie Sullivan first appeared on October 30, 2006, portrayed by actress Tammy Lauren. She was last seen on February 21, 2008, without a proper exit.

On her character, Lauren stated "Women who act as tough as Maggie are probably more scared of things than others". Lauren also said that when the character joined, she was only for the purpose of the Carmen Mesta murder case.

History
Maggie Sullivan first came onto the scene in Genoa City to investigate the murder of Carmen Mesta, whose body was found behind the club Indigo. Throughout the case, she remained a force to be reckoned with and continued to search for the truth as to who killed Carmen, where she was murdered and why. She also began a relationship with Paul Williams, but it had a rocky start when she tracked him to an abandoned warehouse and found what she believed to be Phyllis Newman imprisoned in a cage, but it was actually the psychotic Sheila Carter, who had undergone plastic surgery to look like Phyllis. Maggie let "Phyllis" out, only to be choked by her and left for dead. Sheila then imprisoned Paul in the cage with Maggie and shot Maggie.

After Sheila-as-Phyllis was killed, Paul visited Maggie in the hospital and told her that when questioned, she should leave Lauren and Michael out of the story, as they too, like Maggie, had "stumbled into this themselves." Then, a fellow detective came to ask Maggie about her shooting and Paul was asked to step outside. Maggie never told anyone of Michael, Paul, or Lauren's involvement and she and Paul resumed dating. Months later, Paul gave Maggie another shock when he revealed that the new Assistant D.A. in town was his daughter Heather Stevens that he'd had with his ex-wife, April. The only thing was Heather did not know Paul was her biological father. This led Maggie to encourage him to tell Heather the truth.. She and Paul did not break up on camera, and no mention was made of her when Paul began seeing Nikki.

== David Chow ==
David Chow
- The Young and the Restless character
- Portrayed by: Vincent Irizarry
- Duration: 2007–08
- First appearance: January 9, 2007
- Last appearance: August 1, 2008
- Created by: Lynn Marie Latham; Scott Hamner
- Introduced by: Lynn Marie Latham
In-universe information
- Other names: Angelo Serafini (birthname); Clark
- Occupation: Mobster hit man
- Spouse: Janelle Chow (1989–94); Angela Perkins (1995–2000); Bitsy Hartford (2001–06); Nikki Newman (2008)

David Chow first appeared on January 9, 2007, portrayed by Vincent Irizarry, investigating the murder of ex-fiancée Carmen Mesta. Later marrying Nikki Newman, David was a mobster hit man who later died in a car accident with Sabrina Costelana.

Casting
Irizarry's casting for the role was announced by multiple sources in November 2006. He taped his first scenes on November 21, 2006, and was to "tackle the role of David Chow, a character who is connected to the recently-murdered Carmen Mesta." In 2008, it was reported that Irizarry was to exit The Young and the Restless. After the announcement of his departure, news broke that Irizarry was to reprise his All My Children alter-ego, David Hayward.

History
David Chow was a savvy political operative who arrived in Genoa City to avenge the murder of his former fiancée, Carmen Mesta. He quickly zeroed in on Drucilla Winters as the chief suspect in her murder, and gave a tape of a heated argument between the two to the press, which elevated further suspicions on Dru, who was extremely angry with Carmen for her involvement with her husband, Neil Winters. David waged an ugly campaign to drive Dru crazy by hiring Carmen's look-alike cousin, Ines, to appear around town and haunt Dru. After Jana Hawkes confessed to killing Carmen, David and Ines came to Dru's competency hearing to prove her sanity.

Meanwhile, Victor Newman made David a lucrative offer to work on Jack Abbott's Wisconsin state senate campaign. David then released a video of Jack's competition, Victor's then-wife Nikki Newman, stripping to make her look bad, leading to his firing. Nikki saw this move as an opportunity to get David to work for her, and she then had two campaign managers in the forms of him and Karen Taylor. David and Nikki connected, even after her son Nicholas Newman was hurt by him. When Victor was out of town looking for his estranged son, Nikki and David shared a kiss, which unbeknownst to them was recorded by Sharon Abbott and Phyllis Newman. Victor discovered their kiss online, which caused more marital problems for the couple and ruined Nikki's senate campaign. She lost the election to Jack, but continued to see David afterward.

Soon after, Nikki hired David to work for her company, N.V.P. Following an accident, Nicholas was presumed dead and then found alive, and an accident left Nikki's daughter Victoria Newman in a coma. These events brought Nikki and Victor back together, and Nikki insisted that David get out of her life. Evidently, this didn't last long as her reunion with Victor was shattered, and she and David became engaged. However, Nikki lost N.V.P. in her divorce settlement. Later on, David and Nikki became co-CEOs of Jabot Cosmetics. Victor warned her about David's eventful past, which included three previous marriages. He believed David was after Nikki's money, but she didn't listen to Victor and they continued their engagement.

Walter Palin then arrived in town, a loan shark who David paid off his debt to. Walter was the only person who knew David's true identity, "Clark". After a heated fight between the two men, David agreed to tell Nikki about his gambling problem and debt, which she chose to pay off and tried to commit him to help with his addiction, which he refused. However, Brad Carlton set David up to relapse with the help of Skye Lockhart, as he did not believe David was worthy of his CEO position. Skye ended up taking money from David in a poker game.

Victor became engaged to Sabrina Costelana, which made Nikki jealous, and she and David thus eloped to Mexico to "one-up" him. Paul Williams then investigated David's previous marriages, which revealed that both of them were extremely wealthy and had been met with untimely, suspicious ends. David's third wife Bitsy Hartford told Paul that he got away with killing his first wife Janelle by saying she committed suicide after he cheated on her. Paul then met Mina King, the daughter of David's second wife, Angela Perkins, who, convinced that he murdered her, told Paul that David told Angela to cut her out of the will, leaving him the sole beneficiary, and that he cut the brakes in her car, causing the fatal car accident that killed her. When Paul confronted David with this information, he said Mina was cut from the will because of her drug addiction. Eventually, David had no choice but to tell Nikki of his eventful past.

David said Janelle died of a sleeping pill overdose while they were traveling the world on humanitarian missions, and that he was never charged for her murder. Angela supposedly crashed her car into a telephone pole and died after a heated argument with him, and Bitsy was supposedly extremely paranoid which led to an affair with Carmen, a divorce and allegations against David.

Brad continued to feed his gambling addiction, debts began to appear again and David became desperate for money. Eventually, he asked Nikki for a divorce as he feared he'd gamble all her money away. Nikki refused to give up on him; however Paul continued to search through his past and discovered his real name was Angelo Sarafini, and was in fact a mobster hit man for Walter, or Tony Amato. He was then involved in the death of Ji Min Kim acting on Walter's behalf, and then Mina died under suspicious circumstances. Learning of all these events, Nikki left David and planned to divorce him.

At a charity gala, David spiked Nikki's drinks with dangerous amounts of morphine; however, she was rescued and brought to hospital before it affected her. At the same time, Sabrina insisted that she and David ride home together as she didn't feel well. Their limousine crashed; Victor got a call about a Mrs. Newman in distress and arrived on the scene, expecting it to be Nikki, when in reality, it was Sabrina. Victor was confused as to why she was with David, but they both ended up dying from their severe injuries. Later revelations state that Walter was responsible for the accident. After his death, David was continually suspected in the murder of Ji Min Kim and then Skye, which proved to be a fake-out.

== Karen Taylor ==
Karen Taylor
- The Young and the Restless character
- Portrayed by: Nia Peeples
- Duration: 2007–09
- First appearance: April 18, 2007
- Last appearance: May 14, 2009
- Created by: Lynn Marie Latham; Scott Hamner
- Introduced by: Lynn Marie Latham
In-universe information
- Occupation: Director of marketing Editor; Head of Public Relations; Director of Newman Enterprises Consolidated Cosmetics Division; Singer; Campaign manager for Nikki Newman's senate race Worked at Granville Global; Campaign manager in Columbus, Ohio
- Husband: Neil Winters (2008–09)
- Adoptive daughters: Ana Hamilton (foster)

Karen Taylor first appeared on April 18, 2007, portrayed by actress Nia Peeples. Initially a small guest role, she departed on May 13, 2008. However, Peeples returned to the role on June 13, 2008. In March 2009, it was announced that Peeples had been let go from the role, and her last airdate was May 14, 2009. A month before her final airdate, Peeples spoke out about her firing from the role, blasting her fellow cast members such as Kristoff St. John who played her onscreen husband, and Eva Marcille. The character was described as "a savvy political operative who, after managing Nikki Newman's senatorial campaign, landed a powerful executive position at Newman Enterprises."

History
Karen arrived in Genoa City as Nikki Newman's campaign manager for her Wisconsin state senate campaign; however Nikki lost the campaign and Karen was fired. She dated Neil Winters after his wife's death. His children, Lily Winters and Devon Hamilton, didn't approve of Karen after their mother's death, however later began to give her a chance. Karen and Neil moved in together; Lily then found herself pregnant by her boyfriend, Cane Ashby; Neil proposed to raise the child with Karen, but Karen was extremely against Neil's proposal, and subsequently moved out. Realizing he was still mourning over his late wife, Drucilla, Karen left town.

A month later, Neil traveled to New York to win Karen back; and proposed marriage. She rejected him however she returned to Genoa City and they got back together. She started to show a different side of herself when a woman named Tyra Hamilton came to town and began to spend time with Neil. Tyra was Devon's adoptive aunt and his birth mother Yolanda Hamilton's adoptive sister. Drucilla's sister, Dr. Olivia Winters, returned to Genoa City, and she recognized Karen as a past patient. After meeting, they agreed to keep the secret between them hidden. Shortly after, Karen confessed to Neil that she had a hysterectomy after learning that she could give her child cancer. She asked him to decide if he still wanted to be with her even though she could not bear children. Neil quickly reassured an uneasy Karen that he still wanted to be with her.

Upon hearing the news of Katherine Chancellor's "death", Neil started to think about his life, and he decided to again propose to Karen, who happily accepted after a little reluctance. They planned to get married, but when Devon's biological sister, Ana Hamilton, was taken away from her aunt Tyra's custody, they decided to get married sooner so that they could become foster parents for Ana. The couple married on New Year's Eve 2008. Karen quickly became jealous of Tyra and Neil's relationship. She decided that she wanted to adopt Ana to start a family with Neil. Neil was reluctant yet open to the idea. Meanwhile, Tyra kissed Neil on two separate occasions. The second time, Karen witnessed the kiss; she kept them apart by making it appear as though Neil was attempting to adopt Ana behind Tyra's back. Karen was deeply distraught upon learning that Neil had a one-night stand with Tyra, but she managed to collect herself and continue battling to become a foster parent for Ana. In a turn of events, Neil testified on Tyra's behalf, and Tyra was then granted custody of Ana once again. Appalled, Karen packed her bags and left town, telling Neil that she hated him before she left.

== Ben Hollander ==
Ben Hollander
- The Young and the Restless character
- Portrayed by: Billy Warlock
- Duration: 2007–08
- First appearance: May 7, 2007
- Last appearance: January 7, 2008
- Created by: Lynn Marie Latham; Scott Hamner
- Introduced by: Lynn Marie Latham
In-universe information
- Occupation: Head of the John Abbott Memorial Foundation; Formerly State Senator Jack Abbott; Former Campaign Manager for Jack Abbott

Ben Hollander first appeared on May 7, 2007, portrayed by veteran actor, Billy Warlock. Casting was announced on March 29, 2007. Warlock is known for his previous roles on Days of Our Lives and General Hospital. The character appeared from May to August 2007, with brief appearances from November 29 to December 10; and two episodes in 2008.

History
When Jack Abbott decided to run for the Wisconsin State Senate seat, he fired David Chow as his campaign manager and hired Ben to take over the position. Jack's opponent, Nikki Newman, hired David Chow, and the two campaign managers began their battle for a better campaign. Ben stayed as Jack's manager after Jack had won the election, but he lost his job after Jack had to step down from his seat due to a scandal. Since then, Ben has been working on the John Abbott Memorial Foundation.

== Jeffrey Bardwell ==
Jeffrey Bardwell
- The Young and the Restless character
- Portrayed by: Ted Shackelford; Kin Shriner (2011)
- Duration: 2007–15
- First appearance: August 8, 2007
- Last appearance: January 9, 2015
- Created by: Lynn Marie Latham; Scott Hamner
- Introduced by: Lynn Marie Latham
In-universe information
- Occupation: Con artist
- Siblings: William Bardwell
- Spouse: Anita Lawson (dissolved); Gloria Bardwell (2008, 2008–09, 2012–16)
- Daughters: Chelsea Lawson
- Grandsons: Johnny Abbott; Connor Newman

Jeffrey Bardwell first appeared on August 8, 2007, as the identical twin brother of William Bardwell, portrayed by Ted Shackelford on a recurring status. In 2011, Shackelford briefly stepped out of the role and it was temporarily assumed by Kin Shriner. Shackelford has since returned to the role.

Casting
Ted Shackelford has portrayed the role since 2007, and previously portrayed the role of William Bardwell for over a year. In 2011, it was announced that Shackelford would briefly vacate the role and it would be temporarily assumed by Kin Shriner, who briefly appeared on The Young and the Restless as Harrison Bartlett in 2004. He began airing on April 20, 2011, and was last seen in the role on September 16. Shackelford returned to the role on December 6 for a brief appearance, and then returned for additional appearances beginning January 11, 2012.

History
Jeffrey is the identical twin brother of the late William Bardwell, first appearing in Genoa City at his wake. Gloria Bardwell, William's widow, was confused to as who Jeffrey was, and later revelations stated that Jeffrey came to town after receiving a package from William with a sample of a face cream called Glo'Again, with a note telling him to not let "her" (Gloria) get away with it. In reality, Gloria had tampered with the cream at Jabot Cosmetics causing several customers' faces to be burned. Jeffrey blackmailed Gloria into marrying him, threatening to tell the police about the incident. In reality, Jeffrey just wanted to inherit the money left to Gloria by his brother and even Gloria's other late husband John Abbott Sr. They eloped to Las Vegas, and lived in the Abbott mansion together. Jeffrey wanted to have sex with Gloria to make the marriage fun, but he was teaming up with Jack Abbott and Sharon Newman to get Gloria to leave the mansion by hiring a man named Alistair Wallingford, who was identical to John, in an effort to scare her away. However, Alistair was smitten by Gloria, and he confessed to the entire endeavor. Afterward, Jeffrey's Korean mistress, Kyon, arrived at the mansion, and after Gloria caught them together, she left him, and afterward Jeffrey became involved with Jill Abbott and asked Gloria for a divorce.

Their divorce left Gloria penniless, forcing her to work at Crimson Lights coffeehouse. She decided to get back at Jeffrey and Jill by pouring hot sauce into their coffees, not realizing Jeffrey was in fact highly allergic to such which sent him to the hospital. Jeffrey nearly died from the incident, and as an act of revenge Jill told Gloria he had died. Jeffrey was really recuperating at the Chancellor estate, where he wrote a note to Gloria which he tore up. When Gloria discovered Jeffrey was alive, she went to the estate to apologize, where Jill spoke about her scheming history, leading Gloria to believe Jeffrey told her about the face cream incident. Gloria felt betrayed by Jeffrey and decided to cut him out of her life, while at the same time Katherine Chancellor discovered the torn up note he wrote to her. Realizing he loved Gloria, she found him in the arms of Alistair. Eventually, Jeffrey confessed his love for her and they had sex, but she discovered his passport with a stamp from the Cayman Islands, accusing him of stealing her missing diamonds. Jeffrey ended things with Gloria and returned to Jill. However, despite returning to Jill's arms, he confessed his affair with Gloria and thus their relationship ended. Jeffrey begged Gloria for a second chance, and they married for a second time in Vegas. He also confessed to taking the missing diamonds which was met with forgiveness from Gloria.

Jeffrey and Gloria then wanted to acquire all the shares in Jabot, enlisting the help of Gloria's son Michael Baldwin to set up a dummy corporation. He agreed to do so if Jeffrey gave him the face cream, which he believed Kyon took by mistake. Jeffrey went to Korea to find Kyon and the face cream, returned to reveal he was unsuccessful but in reality he had it in his briefcase. Soon after, Gloria's ex-husband and Michael's father River Baldwin came to town, making Jeffrey jealous. River was a longtime fugitive, so Jeffrey reported him to the police for Gloria's safety. She ended up helping River with his daughter Eden Baldwin, causing Jeffrey to leave her. However, he returned weeks later and they reunited, but Jeffrey told Gloria that he indeed has the face cream with a written letter he will send to the police to report her if she ever crosses him again. He then found a photo of Gloria and River which he tore up, and told her that their marriage was now nothing more but a business arrangement. Gloria told Jeffrey she loved him and only him, which Jeffrey chose not to believe, and they divorced again.

When Katherine was believed to be dead, it was revealed that she left 5% of her Jabot stock to Gloria, and she and Jeffrey decided to then take over Jabot with Jack, which was unsuccessful. Despite two divorces, Gloria and Jeffrey remained on good terms, and eventually they reunited. However, Jeffrey supposedly left Genoa City to go to Vegas, where it was revealed that he had gambled away all of Gloria's money, leaving her broke. In reality, Angelo Veneziano had Jeffrey kidnapped and stole her money so he could make a move on Gloria and help her run her nightclub, Gloworm. Jeffrey was later seen on a deserted island trying to make a fire, and eventually Gloria's other son Kevin Fisher and Angelo's daughter Angelina Veneziano found him living in Angelo's fishing cabin, and supposedly suffered memory loss. He stole their motor boat and eventually made it back to Genoa City, where Jill brought him to an extremely angry Gloria. Still having no memory of the last few months, Gloria made him a bus boy, where he met Anita Lawson, who was astounded that he had no memory of her. Gloria and Angelo became engaged, and he locked Jeffrey in a dumpster behind Gloworm when he realized he'd regained his memory and what Angelo did to him. After breaking free, Jeffrey told Gloria what Angelo had done causing him to leave, and the ceremony was given to him and Gloria. However, Anita's daughter Chelsea Lawson claimed that Jeffrey was his father, which was confirmed by a DNA test. Anita then revealed to Jeffrey that they were still legally married, and he sent her on a trip around the world. Since then, she has returned and revealed to Gloria and Chelsea that she and Jeffrey were married.

There was initially some hostility, but Jeff and Gloria were able to work through this. Later, Jeff was able to convince Chelsea to come spend time with him at Gloworm. Although she initially suspected him of trying to scheme money out of her, he surprised her with pleasant company and giving her money to buy a present for her expecting child in his name.

== Roxanne Barrington ==
Roxanne Barrington
- The Young and the Restless character
- Portrayed by: Tatyana Ali (2007–2013); Tetona Jackson (since 2026)
- Duration: 2007–2013, since 2026
- First appearance: September 17, 2007
- Created by: Lynn Marie Latham and Scott Hamner
- Introduced by: Lynn Marie Latham and Josh Griffith (2007); Sally McDonald (2026)

Roxanne Barrington first appeared on September 17, 2007, portrayed by former The Fresh Prince of Bel-Air actress Tatyana Ali as the love interest for Devon Hamilton. The role was initially a guest meant to air only on September 17 and 18, but Ali's stint on the show was extended and eventually upgraded to a recurring status.

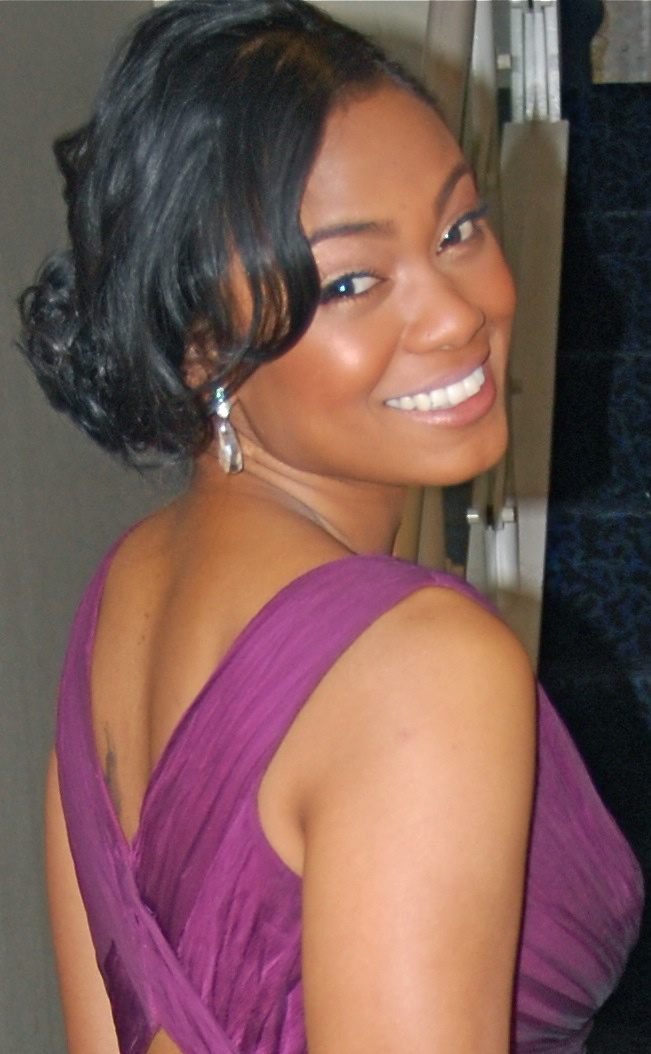
Tatyana Ali took home an NAACP Image Award for her portrayal of "Roxanne"

For her recurring work on The Young and the Restless, Ali won an NAACP Image Award in 2011, beating out the likes of Debbi Morgan for the award, surprising the public. The award was for Outstanding Actress in a drama series despite her on and off role and lack of airtime. She was nominated for the same award in 2012. In October 2026, it was announced the role had been recast with Tetona Jackson. She made her first appearance during the November 20 episode that same year.

Roxanne was introduced during Lily Winters' divorce party, where she hooked up with Lily's brother, Devon Hamilton. The two began a relationship, with Roxanne making occasional, brief appearances on the show. In August 2009, after a particularly vicious argument, Devon and Tyra Hamilton had sex, unaware that Roxanne had walked in and discovered them in the act. The day after, Roxanne confronted Devon and Tyra, and she eventually broke up with Devon for his infidelity. Later, Lily was diagnosed with ovarian cancer, and Roxanne came back to town to visit her.

She revealed to Lily that she and Devon had broken up because of his relationship with Tyra. Lily confronted Devon about what she had heard, and he revealed his secret tryst with Tyra to her. Lily encouraged Devon to make things right with Roxanne. Initially, Roxanne resisted Devon's sincere attempts to apologize, but eventually she accepted and they resumed their relationship. Roxanne then went on an extended stay to Paris, France, while Devon stayed back in Genoa City to work on his music producing career.

Devon did not see anyone while Roxanne was away. One of her last appearances was at the christening of Moses Winters, before Devon later ended their relationship. She returned to Genoa City in November 2026.

== Reed Hellstrom ==
Reed Hellstrom
- The Young and the Restless character
- Portrayed by: Asher and Cole (2007–2008); Quin and Reed Baron (2008–2009); Max Page (2009–2016); Tristan Lake Leabu (2016–2020)
- Duration: 2007–2020
- First appearance: December 3, 2007
- Last appearance: March 3, 2020
- Created by: Lynn Marie Latham and Scott Hamner
- Introduced by: Lynn Marie Latham and Josh Griffith (2007); Mal Young and Sally Sussman Morina (2016); Mal Young (2018); Anthony Morina and Josh Griffith (2019)
In-universe information
- Other names: Reed Newman Hellstrom
- Occupation: Newman Heir; Student; Aspiring Musician
- Family: Newman
- Father: J.T. Hellstrom
- Mother: Victoria Newman
- Stepfather: Billy Abbott (2010–14)
- Stepmother: Mackenzie Browning (2010–18)
- Half-brothers: Dylan Hellstrom; Johnny Abbott (adoptive)
- Half-sisters: Claire Grace; Katie Abbott; Becca Hellstrom
- Grandparents: Victor Newman; Nikki Newman; Tom Hellstrom; Martha Hellstrom
- Aunts and uncles: Dylan McAvoy; Nicholas Newman; John Abbott III; Adam Newman; Abby Newman
- First cousins: Cassie Newman (adoptive); Noah Newman; Faith Newman; Summer Newman; Connor Newman; Christian Newman; Dominic Abbott Newman Chancellor

Reed Hellstrom is the son of J.T. Hellstrom and Victoria Newman. He was born on December 3, 2007; however, his birth year was later changed to 2005.

Character History
Reed was born prematurely on November 29, 2007, after an accident left his mother, Victoria, in a coma. Victoria was exiting a partially destroyed parking garage in Clear Springs when a piece of falling debris struck her in the head. Victoria did not know Reed's paternity during the pregnancy. His biological father could have been Victoria's estranged husband, Brad Carlton, or her lover and future husband, J.T. Hellstrom. With Victoria and the unborn child's life at stake, the Newman Family went to court to determine whose life should be saved. That decision, thankfully, did not have to be made as both Reed and Victoria survived. J.T. was revealed to be the father after Reed was born, and he and Victoria married in February 2008 after she woke up from her coma. Soon after the marriage, Reed contracted a staph infection, but he recovered. After his parents separated, J.T. and Victoria shared joint custody of their son.

Reed traveled back and forth between Genoa City, where he stays with Victoria, and Washington, D.C., where he stays with J.T. Reed is nine years old as of 2014. In 2016, he is now a teenager, portrayed by Tristan Lake Leabu. He moved back to Genoa City to live with Victoria. The duo suffered a strained relationship due to Reed's rebellious nature and Victoria's strict love and inattentiveness due to work. Reed grew close to Victoria's ex-husband Billy Abbott, who helped the two grow closer together and advised Victoria to encourage Reed's burgeoning musical talent. During this time, Reed also begins a relationship with Mattie Ashby that ends when Reed is arrested for a DUI.

J.T., separated from Mackenzie, returns to Geona City; to Reed's delight, he and Victoria reunite romantically. Unbeknownst to him, J.T. returned to town to investigate Victor, and later begins physically and emotionally abusing Victoria, culminating in J.T. attempting to murder Victor and later relocate the family internationally. Victoria takes a stand and kicks J.T. out, upsetting Reed, who was left in the dark about his father's corrupt side. J.T. returned to attack Victoria, leading to his murder, in self-defense, by Nikki, with Victoria, Sharon Newman, and Phyllis Summers. As the women cover up the murder, Reed feels abandoned by his father's sudden disappearance, and he and Victoria grow closer as she consoles him. Reed ultimately leaves town in 2018 to engross himself in a music program, focusing on his music instead of his missing father. Reed returned to Genoa City in December 2018.

== Sabrina Costelana Newman ==
Sabrina Newman
- The Young and the Restless character
- Portrayed by: Raya Meddine
- Duration: 2008–10
- First appearance: February 28, 2008
- Last appearance: December 23, 2010
- Created by: Josh Griffith and Maria Arena Bell
- Introduced by: Josh Griffith and Maria Arena Bell
In-universe information
- Occupation: Professional art consultant and former chairman, newman art foundation
- Parents: Zara Costelana
- Spouse: Victor Newman (2008)

Sabrina Costelana Newman appeared from February 28 to August 5, 2008, portrayed by Raya Meddine. She was introduced as a friend of Victoria Newman (Amelia Heinle), later pursuing a romance with her father Victor Newman (Eric Braeden). Despite the character dying onscreen, Meddine reprised the role numerous times after Sabrina's death.

History
Sabrina was introduced as a friend of Victoria Newman, whom she had met while she was living in Florence. She arrived in Genoa City in February 2008 to visit Victoria after Victoria had contacted her via e-mail and instantly found herself attracted to Victoria's recently divorced father, Victor Newman, with whom she shared an interest in art. It was soon revealed to viewers that Sabrina had worked as an art curator in Florence, and that she had recently broken up with a man named Phillipe. Before she was about to leave Genoa City, she shared a kiss with Victor Newman. Their attraction soon turned into a relationship, leaving both Victor and Sabrina worried over Victoria's reaction. After learning about it, Victoria furiously confronted her friend, leaving their friendship shattered. Meanwhile, Sabrina accepted Victor's proposal to manage an art gallery that Victor was going to open up for her in Genoa City. Sabrina revealed she was pregnant, and afterward they married.

Zara Costelana, Sabrina's mother, arrived in Genoa City the day before the wedding, even though she was not invited. Victoria later explained to Nick and Phyllis that the reason mother and daughter have a strained relationship is because Zara was not a nurturing parent, preferring instead to treat Sabrina as more of a sister or friend following Mr. Costelana's assassination, rather than a daughter. Sabrina's father was a diplomat who was killed while performing his job, which shattered Sabrina and her mother's relationship.

Sabrina agreed to be in an article in the new magazine, Restless Style, which was started by Jack Abbott, Nicholas Newman, Sharon Newman Abbott and Phyllis Newman. The article was to be approved by Victor and Sabrina and show her in a good light. However, Jack was intent on selling more magazine copies, so he got in contact with sources, including Sabrina's recent ex-boyfriend, and made changes that portrayed her as a woman who would do anything to get ahead – including sexual favors. Sabrina was livid and embarrassed over the article, and especially angry at Victoria because of her accusations. However, she did not let it get to her and she kept her head held up high. In July 2008, she was helping to plan a charity gala that would soon be taking place in Genoa City. On August 1, 2008, she was involved in a fatal car crash along with David Chow and a limo driver, and subsequently miscarried her child. The crash was an intentional attack on David, as a hit had been put out by the mob. Sabrina had asked David to take her home from the charity gala because she was not feeling well. David and the driver were killed instantly but Sabrina was soon found by police alive and was rushed to the hospital. The doctors at the hospital, including experts and specialists brought in at Victor's request by attorney Michael Baldwin, said she did not have much time to live. She needed a liver transplant, as hers was lacerated. However, according to the doctors, there were more needy and longtime transplant candidates ahead of her and she could not be moved up the list quickly enough. Towards the end of her life, Victoria made peace with her and they were friends again. On August 5, she died soon after going into cardiac arrest and could not be resuscitated. After her death, her possessions were given to charity. Her funeral was being planned by Jana Hawkes at Victor's request, but was unexpectedly canceled by Victor so that he could attend Sabrina's burial alone.

Several weeks after Sabrina's death, Nikki Newman had numerous dreams that Sabrina and a little girl, presumably Sabrina and Victor's miscarried child, were talking with her, causing her to feel extremely guilty about Sabrina's death. David Chow also appeared in some of the dreams, telling Nikki that she was at fault for Sabrina's death, despite her having nothing to do with it in reality. Victor also accused Nikki of having a hand in her death because he felt that she had brought David into their lives by marrying him. This caused Nikki to become extremely upset several times, but eventually the dreams and accusations from Victor stopped.

Sabrina appeared as a ghost on September 24, 2008, when an emotional Victor asked her to come and take him, but Sabrina refused to take Victor along. Sabrina reappeared as a ghost on June 1, 2009, when Ashley Abbott Newman dreamed that she was in front of a statue of Sabrina on the Newman Ranch, which Victor had paid someone to create before her death. Ashley asked Sabrina to give her and her baby peace. Sabrina told Ashley not to be afraid, that she was completely sane, and did not need to worry anymore because as long as Victor was happy that is all that matters to her. Sabrina also tells Ashley that she is giving Victor what she had hoped to give him (a baby) before she was "called away."

Sabrina made subsequent appearances to Ashley in her mind (hallucinations) over the course of the next several months in 2009 while Ashley was having mental problems and believed Sabrina to somehow be alive and trying to "take her baby." Ashley's mental distress eventually resulted in her having a miscarriage when she fell down the staircase at the Newman Ranch after thinking she saw Sabrina and trying to run away from her. However, she had actually seen Victor's son, Adam Newman, who was wearing a dress similar to the one Sabrina was wearing the night of the car accident that killed her and playing an audio recording of Sabrina's voice to scare Ashley and cause her further mental anguish. After the miscarriage, Ashley's visions of Sabrina eventually stopped and Ashley's mind tricked her body into thinking it was still pregnant, which a doctor later deemed was a "hysterical pregnancy." Sabrina did not make any further appearances to Ashley after August 2009.

On December 23, 2010, Sabrina appeared to Victor in a dream he had along with Hope Wilson and Colleen Carlton as the "ghost" who was showing Victor the present, while Hope showed him the past and Colleen (whose face was not shown) showed what the future would be like if Victor continued treating his family badly. This dream prompted Victor to go see his family and friends on Christmas, despite the fact he was planning on spending Christmas alone.

== Alistair Wallingford ==
Alistair Wallingford
- The Young and the Restless character
- Portrayed by: Jerry Douglas
- Duration: 2008
- First appearance: March 18, 2008
- Last appearance: June 11, 2008
- Created by: Maria Arena Bell
- Introduced by: Maria Arena Bell
In-universe information
- Occupation: Actor

Alistair Wallingford first appeared on March 18, 2008, portrayed by Jerry Douglas, who portrayed the late John Abbott Sr. The character departed on June 11, 2008. His character was announced to interact with Jack and Sharon Abbott, and Jeffrey Bardwell. When asked to describe his character in an interview, Douglas stated ––

He is a devoted stage artist in his own mind. He has no qualms about telling you how great he is. And he is very charming! Now that I have portrayed him for a few weeks, I think he is genuinely a good person with a good heart. He is a bit of a lost soul. He has no roots. A kind of wandering minstrel from theater to theater for most of his life but he loves the stage and he loves performing. I find him fascinating.

Douglas also said it was very fun to play a character other than the "ghost" John. Alistair was a down-on-his-luck actor who happened to be a lookalike of the late John Abbott Sr.

History
Alistair enjoyed his beer and wine and was usually drunk, causing problems with Jack and Sharon's plans. They finally fired him and tried to keep him hidden away in a room at the Genoa City Athletic Club, but he escaped from Sharon and returned to the Abbott mansion to pursue his attraction for Gloria. When he entered the house, Lauren was about to walk down the stairs when she saw him and, thinking he was John Abbott, fainted and fell down the stairs. Alistair later ran into Katherine Chancellor at Crimson Lights Coffeehouse, and she was surprised at how similar Alistair looked to John. She then saw Alistair near her house and invited him inside, where she learned more about Alistair. Jill Foster Abbott, her daughter, was also shocked when she first saw Alistair. The two women later learned more about Jack's plot against Gloria, and the fact that Alistair had fallen in love with Gloria. Eventually, Jack and Sharon decided that it was time to be rid of Alistair. The Abbotts made a $50,000 donation to a struggling, out-of-area theater group in exchange for Alistair being cast in both their summer and fall productions (the latter being the role of "Felix" in The Odd Couple). Before he could leave, however, Alistair insisted on saying goodbye to Gloria.

== Skye Lockhart ==
Skye Lockhart
- The Young and the Restless character
- Portrayed by: Laura Stone
- Duration: 2008; 2010
- First appearance: April 29, 2008
- Last appearance: December 29, 2010
- Created by: Maria Arena Bell
- Introduced by: Maria Arena Bell
In-universe information
- Occupation: Co-founder of the newman hedge fund
- Husband: Adam Newman (2010)

Skye Lockhart first appeared on April 29, 2008, as a friend from Adam Newman's past. She was portrayed by Laura Stone. She left on July 11, 2008, returning briefly on March 3, 2010, and again for a final stint beginning June 7, 2010.

By November 2010, it was speculated that Skye was to leave The Young and the Restless permanently. Skye fell into a volcano and died; the character's last air date was December 29, 2010.

History
Shortly after Adam Newman returned to Genoa City as an adult, his old Harvard friend, Skye, came to visit. Skye graduated first from Harvard Business School while Adam was second. Skye arrived to catch up for old times' sake. She spent a few days in town playing poker with David Chow, and she won a large amount of money. Then, she disappeared after she was last seen at the airport. A few months later, a body was found in one of the horse stalls at the Newman ranch, dismembered into little pieces. The body was identified as Skye Newman after her Harvard ring was discovered at the scene. In March 2010, Adam had a vision of Skye giving him life advice. Three months later, Adam faked his own death and fled town as a part of a con that he and Skye were involved with. Skye, revealed to be alive, appeared in Brazil lying in bed with Adam. Skye provided for the couple, winning large sums of money by gambling. Soon, the couple was tracked down. The body believed to be Adam Newman was actually discovered to be that of Richard Hightower, and Adam was a suspect in his murder. Skye stayed behind in Brazil, and the authorities took Adam back to Wisconsin. After Adam was brought back to Genoa City, Skye appeared at his arraignment, much to Adam's surprise. Adam was sentenced to prison with bail. Skye agreed to pay Adam's bail if he married her.

Once married to Adam, Skye decided to hire Vance Abrams, a skilled attorney, to take on his case. Because of this, Adam won his case and became a free man, much to the shock of everyone in town. Skye and Adam then started "The Newman Fund", a company designed to spite her father-in-law, Victor Newman, and also to make them millions. It was quickly obvious that Skye had the upper hand in their relationship, as she ordered Adam around and told him what he could and could not do. Later, Skye accepted Jack Abbott's proposal to invest in the Newman Fund. She continued to promote the Newman hedge fund, and she persuaded Billy Abbott to let her appear on the front cover of his magazine, Restless Style, which upset Victor. She also had sex with Jack Abbott to make Adam jealous.

Adam was jealous of Skye and Jack's relationship, but he was also suspicious of Jack, fearing that he and Victor were working together on a plan to bring him down. Skye was aware that Adam was paranoid about Victor and Jack, but she soon became furious after Billy's article damaged The Newman Fund. She then found Jack attempting to access her computer. Each time, Jack was able to talk his way out of the sticky situation, and he and Skye had sex several times. Victor managed to destroy The Newman Fund, and Skye was left in a state of shock after she lost everything, including Adam. After another intense confrontation with Adam, Skye turned up missing, leading Genoa City residents to believe that Adam killed Skye. However, Skye was later seen flying on the Newman jet with Victor. Skye called Victor, who arranged to help her by trashing her room and flying her off to Hawaii to again fake her death for Adam to be arrested and locked up. Over the following weeks, Adam was arrested and jailed while his new love interest, Sharon Newman, tried to help prove that Adam did not kill Skye.

In December 2010, Sharon got a lead as to where Skye might be. She headed to Hawaii, and she came face-to-face with Skye on top of an active volcano during a hike which Skye was participating in. She took a photo of her to prove that she was alive. They had a heated argument, which ended when Skye fell back towards a cliff. Sharon attempted to hang on to Skye, but she was not strong enough to pull her up. Skye lost her grip and fell over into the volcano itself, presumably dying once she hit the lava. Victor had been watching the entire argument unfold from a distance, and he watched as Skye fell, without attempting to help her. After Sharon left the volcano, Victor approached the area, and he threw Skye's glove into the volcano, destroying any evidence of her being there. He then proceeded to burn the hut in which Skye had been living, and he burned all of her clothes. Sharon, having lost the camera with Skye's picture in it, was unable to prove to Hawaiian police that she had seen Skye. She returned to Genoa City empty-handed, and she informed Adam of the incident. Soon after, Adam was freed on all charges while Sharon was now accused of murdering Skye. After several months, Sharon was finally acquitted, and neither she nor Adam was found to be guilty of murdering Skye.

== Ana Hamilton ==
Ana Hamilton
- The Young and the Restless character
- Portrayed by: Jamia Simone Nash (2008–2012); Loren Lott (2018–2024)
- Duration: 2008–2009; 2011–2012; 2018–2019; 2024
- First appearance: June 25, 2008
- Last appearance: November 13, 2024
- Created by: Maria Arena Bell
- Introduced by: Josh Griffith (2008, 2024); Maria Arena Bell (2011); Mal Young (2018)
In-universe information
- Other names: Anastasia Hamilton
- Occupation: Singer; Songwriter; Record producer; Executive assistant; Ghostwriter
- Father: Jett Slade
- Mother: Harmony Hamilton
- Adoptive father: Neil Winters (foster)
- Adoptive mother: Karen Taylor (foster)
- Half-brothers: Devon Hamilton
- Aunts: Monica Dawson; Tyra Hamilton (legal)
- Nephews: Dominic Abbott Newman Chancellor
- First cousins: Elena Dawson
- Other relatives: Virginia Hamilton

Ana Hamilton is the daughter of Harmony Hamilton and sister of Devon Hamilton, first seen on June 25, 2008, portrayed by Jamia Simone Nash. She departed in 2009, returning for guest appearances in both 2011 and 2012. In November 2018, it was announced that Loren Lott had been cast as Ana; she made her debut during the November 28, 2018, episode.

Ana Hamilton came to Genoa City in the summer of 2008 with her "mother", Tyra Hamilton. They surprised her "cousin", Devon Hamilton, with her singing ability. Tyra revealed to Devon's adopted father, Neil Winters, that Ana was actually her sister, Yolanda's daughter, which meant she was Devon's sister. Ana was afraid that Tyra would send her to school in New Hampshire to get rid of her, but Tyra convinced her otherwise when she decided to go to New Hampshire along with Ana. She and Tyra were on their way to Chicago after Ana dropped out of school. Ana ran away from Tyra to be with Devon, but Tyra followed her back. The two reunited and stayed in Genoa City. Soon after their arrival, Yolanda filed a missing persons report on Ana. Ana was put in temporary foster care while the Winters family and Tyra tried to find a way to bring her home. Rafe Torres was working on the case for Ana. Tyra ended up getting legal custody of Ana.

In September 2011, Devon brought up his sister's singing ability to his boss at the time, Tucker McCall. Devon worked for Tucker's record label with Noah Newman until Noah left, and Tucker gave Devon 24 hours to find a replacement act. Tucker later fired Devon because he was unable to find a replacement. It is unknown whether Ana will come back to Genoa City once the news breaks that Devon is the biological son of Tucker McCall and the biological grandson of Katherine Chancellor. She returned on December 21, 2011, after Katherine flew her in for Genoa City's Christmas pageant and surprised both Devon and her biological mother Yolanda, now going by Harmony, whom she hasn't seen since she was a little girl. She returned again on June 27, 2012, to reunite with Harmony and Devon at the birthday party of Charlie and Mattie Ashby and has been working with Devon to produce a single for her.

Ana returned to Genoa City in November 2018, accepting a job offer to become Devon's assistant at Hamilton-Winters.

== Tyra Hamilton ==
Tyra Hamilton
- The Young and the Restless character
- Portrayed by: Eva Marcille
- Duration: 2008–09
- First appearance: June 25, 2008
- Last appearance: August 17, 2009
- Created by: Maria Arena Bell
- Introduced by: Maria Arena Bell
In-universe information
- Sisters: Harmony Hamilton (adoptive)
- Daughters: Ana Hamilton (adoptive)
- Aunts and uncles: Virginia Hamilton (adoptive)
- Nieces and nephews: Devon Hamilton (adoptive)

Tyra Hamilton first appeared on June 25, 2008, and was portrayed by American fashion model and actress Eva Marcille until August 17, 2009.

The characters Tyra and Ana have met with negative reactions from viewers, especially due to the fact that her character has disappeared several times for more than a week. However, the producers have given Marcille a commitment to develop her character and she has been nominated for NAACP Image award.

History
Tyra arrives in Genoa City with her daughter Ana during Lily Winters' birthday party to surprise her nephew Devon Hamilton. Devon's father Neil Winters is worried about the sudden arrival of Devon's aunt and decides to find out more about why Tyra has come to town. After learning that Tyra has lost her job, Neil offers her a job as the manager of Indigo.

Tyra surprises Neil when she confesses that Ana is in fact her sister's daughter and Devon's sister. She then applies for her to get in a private school in New Hampshire, funded by Katherine Chancellor but it backfires when Ana intercepts the call and finds out that Yolanda is her biological mother. Ana accepts to go to New Hampshire and Tyra decides to go with her, but their absence becomes a problem when Devon learns that Ana does not like the school. Kay informs Neil that Ana and Tyra left the school. Tyra comes back to Genoa City looking for Ana, who has run away, and they reunite the same day. Neil tries to convince Tyra to stay in town, much to Karen's displeasure. Tyra begins dating a cop named Gil and develops feelings for Neil. Neil's sister-in-law, Olivia, pushes Tyra to go after Neil even though he is in a relationship with Karen Taylor.

Ana is taken away from Tyra when Yolanda decides to claim her. It is revealed that Yolanda filed a missing child report on Ana. Though Tyra has raised Ana for years, Yolanda has retained custody of her daughter. Neil and Karen marry to become Ana's foster parents. Karen wants to formally adopt Ana, which infuriates Tyra, who can only see her daughter during supervised visits. In a moment of weakness, Tyra kisses Neil, and then runs away from him. They later kiss again, which Karen witnesses. Karen tries to keep them apart by making it appear as though Neil also wants to adopt Ana without Tyra's knowledge. Tyra and Ana run away. Ana texts Neil before it's too late and they make up an excuse to prevent Tyra being stripped from visitation rights. Later on Neil tries to fire Tyra to avoid marital trouble and Tyra accepts both this and Ana being adopted and proceeds to leave telling Neil he is her hero and has been good to her. Neil stops her and they begin to have sex.

They both regret it but are confronted by Devon, Lily and Karen on separate occasions. Neil then helps Tyra get custody of Ana, even though his marriage blows up as a result. They then begin a new relationship but decide to take things slow. Soon thereafter at Lily's wedding to Cane Ashby, Tyra's aunt Virginia reveals to Devon that Tyra is not his biological aunt, having been left with Devon's grandmother as a baby. This revelation leads to a widening rift between Tyra and Devon, who still blames her for the end of Neil and Karen's marriage. However, Devon finds that he is actually quite attracted to Tyra. After a particularly vicious argument, Devon and Tyra have sex with each other, unaware that his girlfriend Roxanne has walked in and discovered them in the act. Roxanne later confronts Devon and breaks up with him, while Tyra hopes that Neil won't find out. However, Devon tells Neil about the one-night stand. Tyra asks Neil for another chance, but he tells her that Lily has his attention at the moment, leading Tyra to announce that she is leaving town.

== River Baldwin ==
River Baldwin
- The Young and the Restless character
- Portrayed by: Michael Gross
- Duration: 2008–09
- First appearance: August 15, 2008
- Last appearance: January 15, 2009
- Created by: Maria Arena Bell
- Introduced by: Maria Arena Bell
In-universe information
- Occupation: Worked as geru at an ashram resort in malibu, ca
- Wife: Gloria Bardwell (1957–75)
- Children: Michael Baldwin; Eden Baldwin
- Grandsons: Fenmore Baldwin

Lowell "River" Baldwin first appeared on August 15, 2008, notably portrayed by former Family Ties actor Michael Gross. TV Guide announced his casting in August 2008, as Michael Baldwin's father, "the one whom he thinks is a low-life, reprobate. A guy who refused to go to Vietnam and left Gloria to raise their son alone."

History
As part of his back story, he and Gloria were anti-establishment hippies, and Lowell left Gloria in 1975, while Michael was still a child, because he was accused of terrorist activity. He stayed on the run for 40 years. Before the character's first appearance, Michael searched for him without success. He accidentally found Lowell, going by the name River, at an Ashram in Malibu.

After coming in contact with Michael and his family, River was arrested for the crimes he was accused of 40 years prior. This arrest led his 15-year-old daughter, Eden Gerick Baldwin, to come to Genoa City to support him. River was put on trial and found innocent after Gloria testified on his behalf. Michael discovered though that River was, in fact, guilty of the crimes of which he was accused, and tried to turn him in. River went on the run again, leaving Eden in Genoa City with Michael.

== Rafe Torres ==
Rafe Torres
- The Young and the Restless character
- Portrayed by: Yani Gellman
- Duration: 2008–12
- First appearance: December 1, 2008
- Last appearance: July 26, 2012
- Created by: Maria Arena Bell; Hogan Sheffer; Scott Hamner
- Introduced by: Maria Arena Bell
In-universe information
- Occupation: Lawyer
- Aunts and uncles: Estella Muñoz

Rafael "Rafe" Torres is a lawyer who first appeared on December 1, 2008. He is portrayed by Yani Gellman. Rafe is the first and only openly gay character to appear on The Young and the Restless since it began airing in 1973. During an interview with Michael Fairman on Advocate.com, Gellman talked about his character, and the fact that he didn't know about Rafe's sexuality going into The Young and the Restless. He also stated he had no reservations about portraying a gay character.

I did not know it going in. It was something that the producers ran by me a little later on in the filming process. It took me maybe all of two milliseconds to respond. I thought it was a great idea and we jumped right in. No hesitancy whatsoever. I had some questions about the story line and where they saw it going and really standard questions you would have for any character you play. They assured me that the role was going to be written in a way that would be quite sensitive and conscientiously written, so that really appealed to me. I gravitated toward it and having this great new character to play. I am just like the viewer, wanting to know what's it going to be and what they are going to throw my way. I am ready for any of the great twists that come my way in the story. –– Yani Gellman on his character

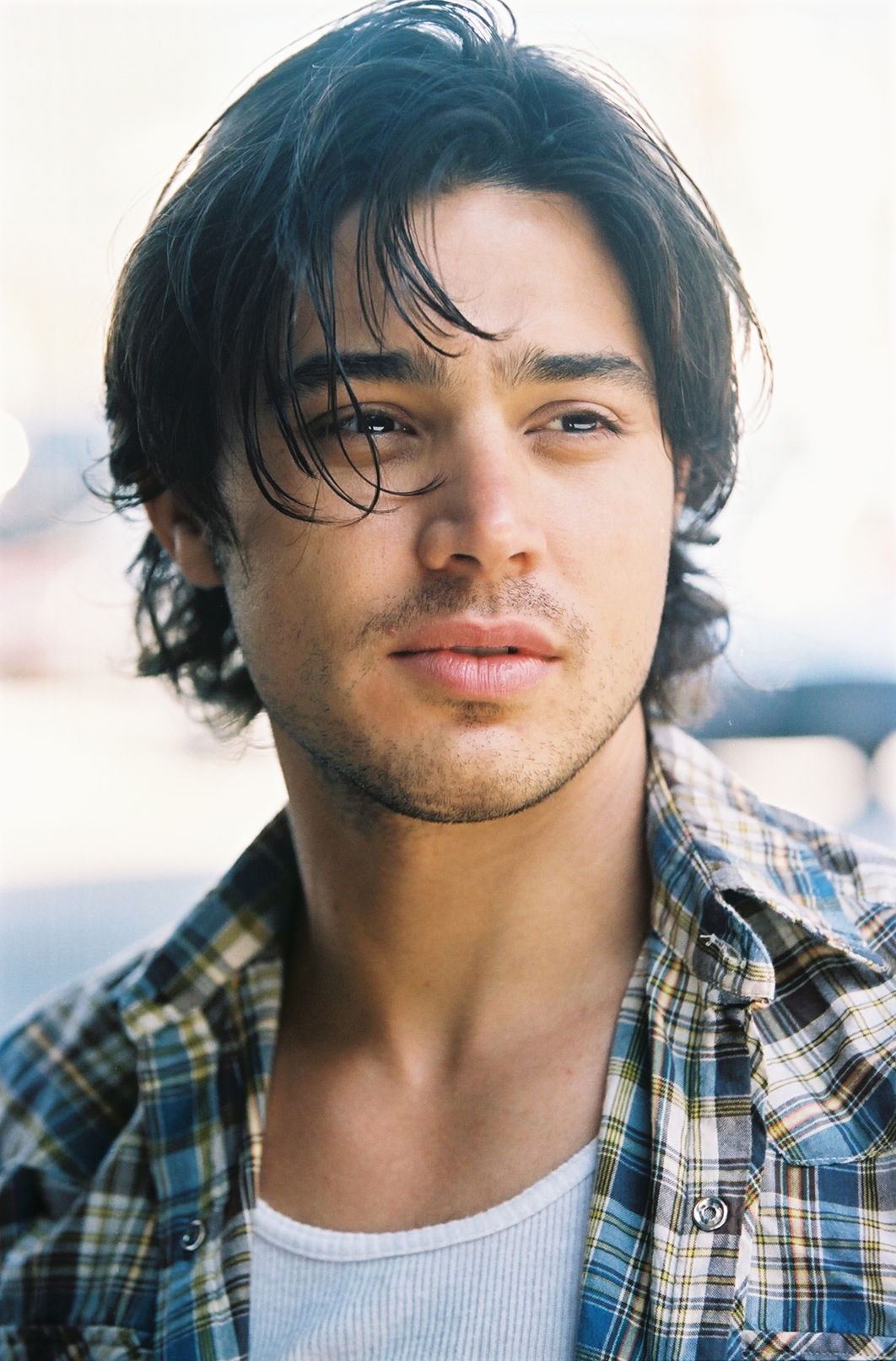
Yani Gellman (pictured) portrayed Rafe Torres.

History
Rafael Torres was a lawyer introduced during Ana Hamilton's foster care battle. He was a longtime friend of Billy Abbott. Rafe also worked as Adam Wilson's lawyer when he was prosecuted for forging the incriminating diary of his father, Victor Newman, and helped out Billy in the custody battle for his daughter with Chloe, Delia. It was also revealed that the Newman's housekeeper, Estella Muñoz, was Rafe's aunt.

Rafe was revealed to be gay when Lily Winters, unaware of his sexual orientation, attempted to set him up on a date with Colleen Carlton. After a matter of fact revelation of his being gay, the two agreed to be friends. After his aunt, Estella, was accused of gaslighting Ashley Abbott, he became determined to prove his aunt's innocence. After talking with Nikki Newman about who might really be behind the gaslighting, he became suspicious of his friend and former client Adam. However, when Rafe went to the Newman Ranch to accuse a house-arrested Adam, Adam tried to distract Rafe by seducing him. He lied to Rafe telling him he had feelings for him. A conflicted Rafe decided to believe him, revealing that he had actually been feeling the same way about Adam. It wasn't what Adam expected to hear, but this did not stop his seduction. Later, the two men had a sexual encounter.

Though it was not shown onscreen, the seduction scene stopped just before a kiss between them and then, when their scene later resumed, Adam and Rafe were shown putting back on their clothes. Post-sexual encounter, Rafe told Adam that he understood that Adam was in love with Heather and knew how negatively Genoa City viewed him, so perhaps Adam was just sexually confused. Rafe explained that he needed to leave, but told Adam that he would stay with Adam (presumably to have more sex) if it was what he wanted. Adam, who was visually shaken by the entire homosexual encounter he'd initiated just to keep Rafe from discovering his lies, tried to remain calm and told Rafe to go citing that because Adam was on house-arrest at the Ranch, Victor would often walk into his bedroom without knocking. As soon as Rafe had left, Adam immediately called Heather and asked her to come over. Once she arrived, he almost immediately initiated sex with her—seemingly to get his mind off what had just happened between him and Rafe.

As the story of Ashley's gaslighting continued (and was seemingly resolved—with his Aunt Estella being proven innocent and insane Patty Williams being wrongly accused instead of the guilty Adam), Rafe was not seen as often. Rafe has recently been acting as Billy Abbott's attorney, and has been helping Billy write an article to expose Adam. In July 2012, Rafe reappeared as Abby Newman's legal counsel after her publicity stunt involving a staged kidnapping with Carmine Basco. Abby wanted Rafe to take Carmine's case as well, but he was unable to handle both cases as well. Rafe was able to get Abby to accept a deal including a fine and community service offered by District Attorney Michael Baldwin and Ronan Malloy. After Abby's deal, he was convinced to take on Carmine's case as well, explaining to Abby that the circumstances make it very unlikely Carmine will be able to get a deal like hers, if at all.

== Patrick Murphy ==
Patrick Murphy
- The Young and the Restless character
- Portrayed by: Michael Fairman
- Duration: 2008–14; 2017
- First appearance: October 29, 2008
- Last appearance: March 3, 2017
- Created by: Maria Arena Bell; Hogan Sheffer; Scott Hamner
- Introduced by: Maria Arena Bell (2008); Mal Young and Sally Sussman Morina (2017)
In-universe information
- Other names: Murphy
- Occupation: Owner of murphy's bait and tackle shop former marine, served in korea
- Spouse: Betty Murphy (1960–62); Katherine Chancellor (2009–13)
- Children: Francis Murphy

Patrick Murphy, better known as simply Murphy, first appeared on October 29, 2008, portrayed by Michael Fairman on a recurring status.

History
Patrick Murphy was a long-time friend of Marge Cotrooke, with whom he often talked at Joe Jr.'s diner. His son Francis Murphy died after an accident and his wife Betty died not too long afterward. When Marge ended up in a car accident with her look-alike Katherine Chancellor, Murphy found Kay at the edge of a lake and nursed her back to health, without realizing that 'Marge' was actually Kay. When her health got better, Kay realized who she really was and Murphy accepted her as a friend, but romance also started blooming between the two. They had been trying to prove Kay's identity for a few weeks with help from Amber Moore, Michael Baldwin, Kevin Fisher and others.

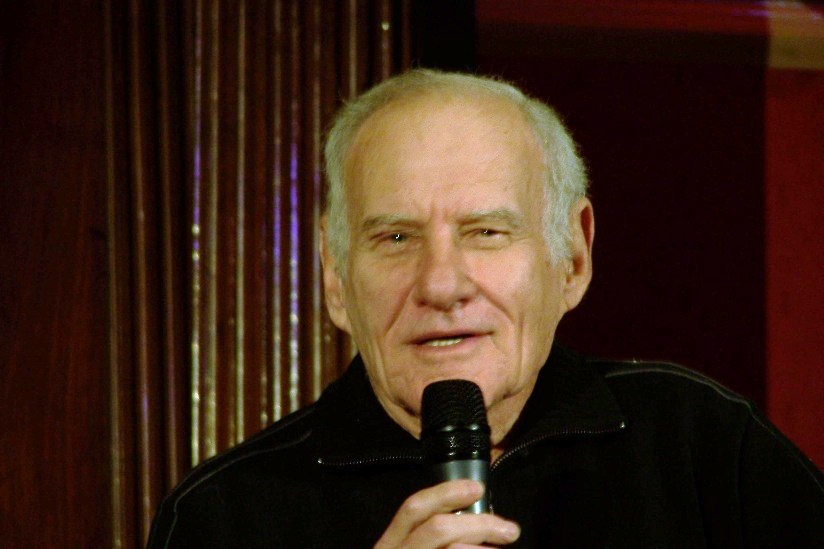
Michael Fairman portrayed Murphy

Murphy was shocked when he returned home one day to find a goodbye note from Katherine claiming that she wasn't really Marge and that she had to leave. Murphy, heartbroken when Katherine could not remember who he was after the explosion (Kay was kidnapped and caught in an explosion by criminals who thought that she was Marge), decided to leave Katherine alone. However, Katherine returned to Murphy after another DNA test showed she was not Katherine, and they reconciled. At the diner, Murphy expressed his happiness that Katherine had brought to him. He proposed to Katherine and she accepted. He had planned to propose on Christmas Eve but Kay had slipped and fallen on some ice, so had Murphy decided to wait. Kay and Murphy later married. A year later Murphy falls gravely ill after he came face to face with Meggie McClaine, a woman from his past. Though mainly it's because as he was about to call Victor to warn him about Meggie, Meggie corners him in his car, thus causing him to have a heart attack. When Murphy attempts to take his medication, Meggie cruelly takes his medication from him and sadistically watches him groan in pain and is later found unconscious from his heart attack.

As a result, he was a prisoner in his own body at the Genoa City hospital, unable to talk or move; however he could blink his eyes, and was attempting to communicate via morse code with his eyelids. He has since made a full recovery and turned Meggie in.

In 2011, Katherine had a stroke, and Murphy found himself in the same position, needing to decide life or death for his comatose wife. Luckily Katherine came-to.

While fishing in Genoa City Park, in August 2011, Murphy found Diane Jenkins' lifeless body. He called the authorities.

In November 2011, Murphy supported Katherine during the reveal of Devon being her grandson.

On May 1, 2012, Katherine and Murphy celebrated their third wedding anniversary back with the old gang at Joe's Diner.

The theme of the 2012 annual Chancellor July 4 pool party/barbeque turned out to be forgiveness. While Murphy tended the grill, Devon forgave Katherine and Tucker, with Roxanne and Ana beaming their approval.

Katherine came out of retirement and became co-CEO of Chancellor again with Jill. Murphy tried not to resent all the time that Chancellor took from their lives.

In April 2013, when Katherine realized she had forgotten to go to Victor and Nikki's remarriage, she was shocked, but fearing Alzheimer's, she did her best to keep it secret. Cane finally realized her problem and coaxed Katherine to see a doctor. She was diagnosed with a brain tumor. Although he tried to persuade her to tell her loved ones, Katherine swore Cane to secrecy. Katherine went in for her surgery to remove the tumor and have it biopsied. Jill and Murphy showed up out of the blue, and offered to call Brock, Devon, Nina and Esther. With good news that the tumor had been benign, Devon, Murphy, Cane, and Jill assembled around Katherine's hospital bed until she finally awakened, feisty as ever. She announced that she was stepping down as CEO, and named Cane as her successor.

Cane gets Katherine home and tells her to close her eyes. She opens them to Murphy, Esther, Chloe, and Kevin shouting, "Surprise!" Murphy wishes her a happy anniversary. Later, Murphy tells Kay he could marry her all over again – but without the drama. "If I lost ya'..." Kay says she plans to be there for quite a while.

During the summer of 2013, Murphy and Katherine leave Genoa City (offscreen), to do a trip around the world (Murphy helps Katherine secretly finalizing her bucket list). On August 19, at the Chancellor estate, the gathered group continues to try to understand what's going on with the postcards they received from Katherine. Murphy arrives and informs them that Katherine died. Murphy says they must now take Katherine on her final journey. Murphy tells them to think about love when they think about Katherine; to think about life, not death. Champagne is passed around. They each flash to a memory of Katherine. They toast. "To Katherine."

Katherine's Memorial is held on September 3. Murphy takes the podium with an urn. He says Katherine wants everyone to participate in remembering her. Murphy tells them there is one more surprise – today is the dedication of Chancellor Park, Katherine's place for now and for always. Then Murphy revealed a plaque saying Chancellor Park. In loving memory of Katherine Chancellor.

Days later, on September 11, when Katherine's will was read, Murphy was bequeathed her vintage automobile collection, one quarter of her money, the cabin on Lake Michigan, and a fishing pole that she never could master.

During periods of being unseen, Patrick's absences were usually explained as having "gone fishing."

== Owen Pomerantz ==
Owen Pomerantz
- The Young and the Restless character
- Portrayed by: Albie Selznick
- Duration: 2009–10
- First appearance: January 13, 2009
- Last appearance: September 17, 2010
- Created by: Maria Arena Bell; Hogan Sheffer; Scott Hamner
- Introduced by: Maria Arena Bell
In-universe information
- Occupation: District attorney (2009–10)

Detective and District Attorney Owen Pomerantz first appeared on January 13, 2009, portrayed by Albie Selznick. His last airdate was September 17, 2010.

History
He first appeared when Adam Wilson was being convicted for forging a diary framing his own father, Victor Newman for murder. He is later seen taking care of a case aiming to find Patty Williams and put her in jail.

Again, after Adam Newman teamed up with and drugged Patty and escaped from the hospital he was staying at, Adam was at the Policeman's Ball where someone killed Richard Hightower to frame Nicholas Newman for murder. Upon the club's explosion he fled town leaving Genoa City authorities with the belief that he had been murdered. Later it was discovered that the body discovered was that of Richard Hightower not Adam Newman. Owen accuses Nick of murder and since he has vendetta against the Newmans, will not drop charges although enough evidence suggests Nick was framed by Adam. This continues for several months until Adams returns to town with Skye Lockhart. Nick's charges are eventually dropped and Adam is put in jail for conspiracy but is soon released on bail by Skye

Owen then discovered that dirty cops were dealing drugs to the inmates of the Genoa City Jail. He puts Chance on the case and then makes it his duty to guard Heather Stevens, since someone involved with the investigation was trying to kill her. Later, Owen hired a new partner for Chance, detective Ronan Malloy. Later it was revealed that Owen was working with det. Sid Meeks and that he was in fact, one of the dirty cops. Ronan is also pretending to be a dirty cop, and when Meeks told him he had to kill Chance, Ronan requested a meeting with the head of the operation, and when he got there, the man in question was Owen. He handed Ronan a gun, and told him that to prove his fidelity, he had to shoot and kill Chance.

Chance then discovered that there were secret meetings being had in an old warehouse by the dirty cops. He decides to go see to try to close the case and to get reinstated as detective. When he got there and he discovered that the dirty cops were Meeds and Owen, Chance made them throw down their guns and assume the position. Ronan Malloy then entered the room with a gun pretending to be a dirty cop to help him. He held his gun to Chance and when Owen saw that Ronan had no intention of shooting Chance, he told Meeks to kill them both. Ronan took a desperate shot to try to kill Meeks, but instead shot and killed Chance accidentally. Owen is later arrested at Chance's funeral. He warns Ronan that he will end up dead like Chance, but Ronan is not betting on it.

== Roger and Annie Wilkes ==
Roger Wilkes
- The Young and the Restless character
- Portrayed by: David Leisure
- First appearance: January 14, 2009
- Last appearance: March 11, 2009
- Created by: Maria Arena Bell; Hogan Sheffer; Scott Hamner
- Introduced by: Maria Arena Bell
In-universe information
- Occupation: Conman
- Wife: Annie Wilkes (1977–); Esther Valentine (2009)

Annie Wilkes
- The Young and the Restless character
- Portrayed by: Marcia Wallace
- First appearance: February 16, 2009
- Last appearance: March 11, 2009
- Created by: Maria Arena Bell; Hogan Sheffer; Scott Hamner
- Introduced by: Maria Arena Bell
In-universe information
- Husband: Roger Wilkes (1977–)

Roger Wilkes was portrayed by David Leisure from January 14 to March 11, 2009. His wife, Annie Wilkes, was portrayed by Marcia Wallace from February 16 to March 11, 2009.

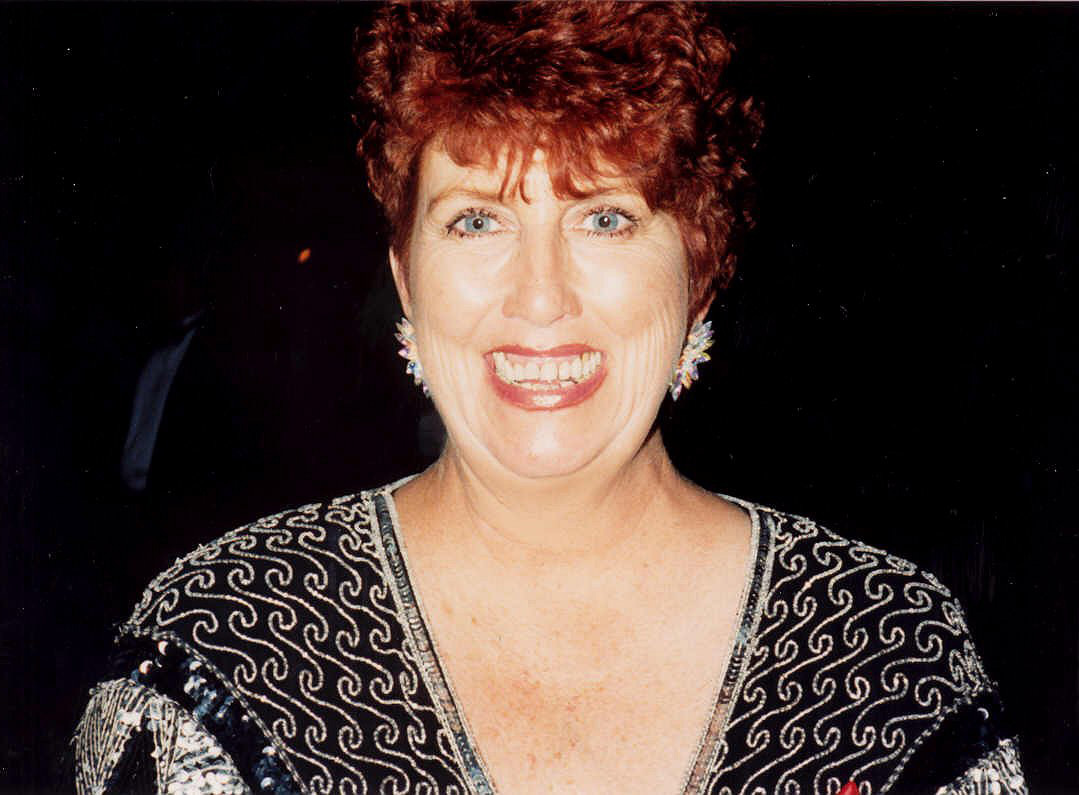
Marcia Wallace (pictured) portrayed the partly compassionate Annie for under a month.

Roger is a con man that was hired by Cane Ashby as an accountant at Jabot, without Cane knowing Roger's real intentions. Roger is working with Clint Radison, a man that had criminal past connected to Katherine Chancellor and who came back to town looking for revenge. Cane's wife Chloe Mitchell asked Roger to go out on a date with her mother Esther Valentine and Roger gladly accepted, then changed his plan to get the Chancellor wealth. He decided to marry Esther to get her money, and decided to rush by asking Esther to marry him just a few days after they had met. Esther gladly accepted, while others started suspecting Roger might have an agenda.

Clint and Roger kidnapped Katherine and brought her to a seedy motel, where she is being watched by Annie Wilkes, Roger's first wife. Annie at first did not trust Kay when she claimed she is not Marge, but Kay slowly started putting doubt in Annie and trying to make her help out while Clint wasn't there to watch over her. Annie was revealed to be a big Katherine Chancellor fan, which also helped Kay convince Annie to help her out. They both tried to escape, only to be stopped by Roger and Clint various times. Clint tried to get rid of everyone by putting a bomb in the motel, while Annie reconsidered and decided to stick with Clint and Roger after all. While running away, Clint took Kevin hostage, but Roger and Annie decided to abandon Clint by escaping before he could find them.

With help from Canadian authorities, Paul Williams tracked down Annie and Roger and brought them back to Genoa City, where they confessed to everything that had happened to free Kevin Fisher from a mental institution, where he had ended up after being mentally tortured by Clint, who had died a few weeks prior to their capture.

== Delia Abbott ==
Delia Abbott
- The Young and the Restless character
- Portrayed by: Riley, Olivia and Isabelle Jones (2009–2010); Alix and Madeline Dubois (2010–2011); Sophie Pollono (2011–2020)
- Duration: 2009–2016; 2020
- First appearance: February 16, 2009
- Last appearance: December 16, 2020
- Created by: Maria Arena Bell, Hogan Sheffer and Scott Hamner
- Introduced by: Maria Arena Bell and Paul Rauch (2009); Jill Farren Phelps (2014); Anthony Morina and Josh Griffith (2020)
In-universe information
- Other names: Cordelia Katherine Valentine Abbott
- Father: Billy Abbott
- Mother: Chloe Mitchell
- Half-brothers: Johnny Abbott; Miles Fisher
- Half-sisters: Katie Newman; Bella Fisher; Ruby Spectra Abbott
- Grandfathers: John Abbott
- Grandmothers: Jill Abbott; Esther Valentine
- Uncles: Jack Abbott; Phillip Chancellor III
- Aunts: Ashley Abbott (legal); Traci Abbott Connelly
- First cousins: Keemo Abbott; Kyle Abbott; Chance Chancellor; Colleen Carlton; Abby Newman (legal)
- Other relatives: Allie Nguyen; Harrison Locke

Delia Abbott was born onscreen on February 16, 2009. The role was first portrayed by various infant child actors, including triplets Riley, Olivia and Isabelle Jones and twins Alix and Madeline Dubois. In 2011, the character was rapidly aged to a 6-year-old, portrayed by Sophie Pollono, when the character was diagnosed with leukemia. Pollono portrayed the role for two years until October 2013, when the character was struck by a car and killed. However, Pollono continues to make appearances as a hallucination to other characters.

Delia was born in February 2009, at the Abbott cabin, with Billy and Lily Winters (Christel Khalil) helping deliver her. Since the character's rapid aging, Delia had been kidnapped, and was later diagnosed with acute myeloid leukemia and was in need of a bone marrow transplant. All of her relatives get tested to become her donor, but none are a match. Billy, who had left town after marital problems, was unable to be located to be tested. Victor Newman (Eric Braeden) later found him in prison in Myanmar and brought him home, but enlisted the help of Chloe's boyfriend Kevin Fisher (Greg Rikaart), who would pose as the donor when in fact it would be Billy. The ruse was successful; Delia received the transplant and later recovered from the illness. In 2013, Delia is scheduled to portray the Wicked Witch of the West in her school play of The Wizard of Oz. Billy gets her a dog, whom she names Dash, for the play, angering Chloe. On the way home from the show with Delia in the car, Billy stops at a store to pick up ice cream. While in the store, Delia opens the car door and Dash runs away. She runs out into the road to follow him, and is struck by a black SUV. Billy finds her on the side of the road and she is brought to the hospital, where she is tragically pronounced dead. Chloe's friend Chelsea Lawson's (Melissa Claire Egan) son Connor is facing blindness and is in need of a cornea transplant. Billy and Chloe offer Delia's corneas to Connor; the transplant is successful and his eyesight is saved. The driver who struck Delia then remained unknown, however, Connor's father Adam Newman (Michael Muhney) was shown to be on that road that night, and later found Delia's scarf trapped on the bottom of his car. It was later revealed that Adam had killed Delia, which ignited Chloe's thirst for revenge.

== Charles Taylor ==
Charles Taylor
- The Young and the Restless character
- Portrayed by: John Rubinstein
- Duration: 2009–10
- First appearance: June 9, 2009
- Last appearance: January 13, 2010
- Created by: Maria Arena Bell; Hogan Sheffer; Scott Hamner
- Introduced by: Maria Arena Bell
In-universe information
- Occupation: OB/GYN

Dr. Charles Taylor first appeared on June 9, 2009, portrayed by John Rubinstein, who portrayed the role for 12 episodes. Dr. Taylor first came to Genoa City when his friend Adam Newman asked him to check on his pregnant stepmother Ashley Abbott.

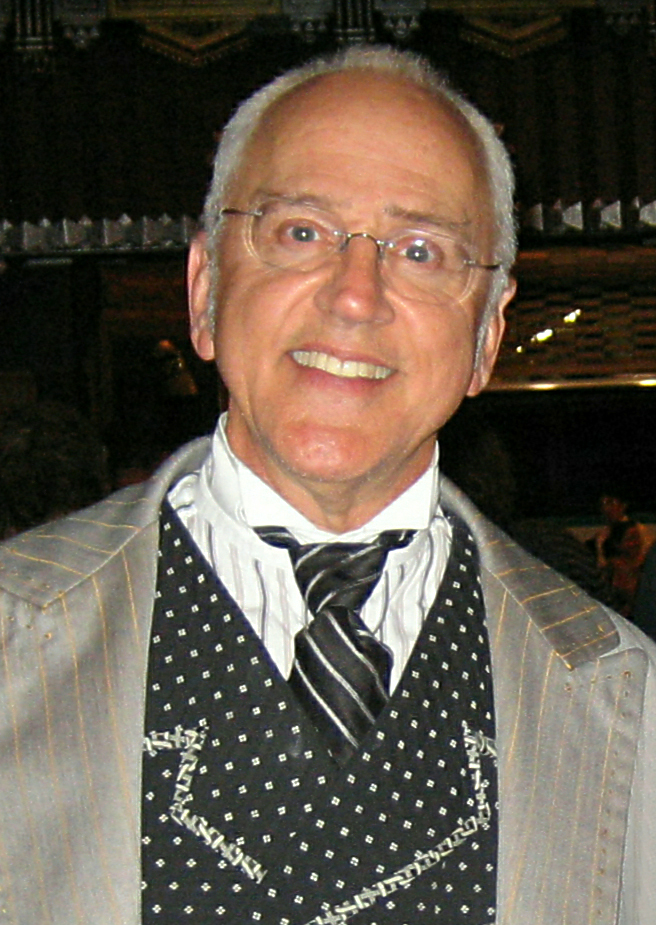
John Rubinstein played a big part in the baby switch

History
Dr. Taylor found out that Ashley had miscarried the child (due to Adam haunting her, which caused her to fall down the staircase). Adam wouldn't let Dr. Taylor tell her, however he was insisting on letting Ashley know. Adam revealed his (then believed to be deceased) girlfriend, Skye Lockhart and told Dr. Taylor that Skye wrote about being molested by him, Dr. Taylor. Adam used this to blackmail Dr. Taylor into keeping Ashley's miscarriage a secret. Together with Adam, they convince Ashley she is pregnant, and she suffers from a hysterical pregnancy.

When Sharon Newman was in labor at the same psychiatric ward that Ashley was in, Sharon was actually pregnant and went into labor. At the same time, Ashley believed that she was in labor despite nothing happening. Dr. Taylor delivered Sharon's baby, and Adam, stressed as to find a solution about Ashley's fake labor, stole Sharon's baby Faith from Dr. Taylor's hands while Sharon suffered from bleeding and passed out in her room. When Sharon went to the hospital (despite her daughter being alive and well) Adam blackmailed Dr. Taylor into revealing to Sharon that Faith was stillborn and "deformed" and told Sharon that she couldn't see the child for these reasons. Sharon was forced to grieve the loss of her alive child, while Ashley raised Faith as her own. Dr. Taylor returned a few months later intend on telling Ashley and Sharon the truth. Instead, Adam shoved him into traffic. He was rushed to the hospital but soon died. But Phyllis Newman found out that he wrote a note before he died. She got her hands on it and brought it to the Newmans and the Abbotts and told them that it said that Ashley suffered a hysterical pregnancy. They soon put the pieces together and Faith was returned to her real mom.

== Ryder Callahan ==
Ryder Callahan
- The Young and the Restless character
- Portrayed by: Wilson Bethel
- Duration: 2009–11
- First appearance: June 23, 2009
- Last appearance: March 3, 2011
- Created by: Maria Arena Bell; Hogan Sheffer; Scott Hamner
- Introduced by: Maria Arena Bell
In-universe information
- Parents: Tom Fisher; Sheila Carter
- Sisters: Daisy Carter
- Half-brothers: Kevin Fisher; John Finnegan
- Half-sisters: Mary Carter Warwick; Diana Carter
- Grandparents: Molly Carter
- Aunts: Sarah Smythe
- Nieces and nephews: Luna Nozawa; Lucy Romalotti; Hayes Finnegan

Ryder Callahan first appeared on June 23, 2009, portrayed by Wilson Bethel. The following year, on July 3, he confirmed his exit, last appearing exactly a month later. Of his exit, he stated, "I have had a great time on this show, I wish it could have lasted a little longer."

On February 21, 2011, his return was confirmed however, it was only for a single episode.

History
Ryder Callahan is the son of Tom Fisher and Sheila Carter, and the twin brother of Daisy Carter. He is the paternal half-brother of Kevin Fisher, and the maternal half-brother of Mary Carter Warwick, Diana Carter and John Finnegan.

Ryder first appeared as a sidekick of Deacon Sharpe. Ryder later came to Kevin and revealed their connection through Tom Fisher. After a DNA test, it was proven that Ryder was Kevin's half-brother. Ryder and Daisy came to Genoa City to get revenge on Lauren Fenmore, whom they held responsible for their mother's death. With the help of their aunt, Sarah Smythe, they committed a series of crimes and eventually kidnapped Lauren and Jana Hawkes. Kevin and Michael Baldwin discovered where they were being held and rescued them.

Daisy and Ryder escaped Genoa City, but he later returned and turned himself in. He began a friendship with Jana. She was sympathetic to him because he showed her kindness during the kidnapping. Jana left Kevin, her husband, for Ryder, and they left Genoa City together. She tried to get him to return to face the charges against him, but he refused. Ryder returned briefly to Genoa City in March 2011 to see Jana, asking for her help in searching for Daisy's baby that she abandoned after Daniel Romalotti, the baby's father, helped her give birth. Ryder is unaware that Jana was his niece's nanny, he left town again.

== Emily Peterson ==
Emily Peterson
- The Young and the Restless character
- Portrayed by: Stacy Haiduk
- Duration: 2009–12
- First appearance: October 13, 2009
- Last appearance: February 8, 2012
- Created by: Maria Arena Bell; Hogan Sheffer; Scott Hamner
- Introduced by: Maria Arena Bell and Paul Rauch
In-universe information
- Other names: Patty Williams
- Occupation: Psychiatrist
- Siblings: Jamie Peterson

Emily Peterson was portrayed by Stacy Haiduk from October 13, 2009, to August 6, 2010, November 29 to December 7, 2011, and January 30 to February 8, 2012. Haiduk had already been portraying Patty Williams for eight months. Haiduk was let go from the show on June 21, 2010, however, she briefly returned in 2011 and again in 2012.

History
Dr. Emily Peterson was the psychiatrist who was treating Patty Williams in Minneapolis prior to her return to Genoa City in early 2009. With her arrival, it was obvious that Patty had altered her appearance with plastic surgery to look exactly like her doctor, Emily, so she was able to come to Genoa City under the alias of "Mary Jane Benson." After Patty's reign of terror that resulted in Victor Newman wounded and near death from a bullet-damaged heart and Colleen's death from drowning while trying to escape from Patty, Emily read a story in a Minnesota newspaper about Patty's crimes. She came to Genoa City to find out what exactly had happened. After talking with Paul Williams about Patty's disturbed history while living in Minneapolis, she confronted Victor and Jack Abbott, and told them they were both responsible for what ultimately happened to Patty. Emily took a job with the Psychology Department of Genoa City University (funded, much to her initial anger, by Jack through the Abbott Family Foundation) and planned to stay in town to continue to treat Patty's psychosis as well as take on new patients. Emily and Jack have become romantically involved. On Christmas Eve, Jack treated Emily to ice skating and the two later decorated the Christmas tree at the Abbott mansion while reminiscing about Christmas past. Emily revealed that her parents are deceased, and she has a brother. Emily was going to stop treating Patty due to the lack of progress she was making, but Patty suddenly had a breakthrough, and this encouraged her to continue as Patty's doctor. On New Year's Eve, Jack proposed to Emily, who said yes. They were planning to get married on Valentine's Day 2010.

While Patty is in her padded cell, her former doctor, Emily Peterson arrives checking up on her trying to reach out to her. Emily soon realizes that Patty knew about her planned wedding with Jack. Patty angry at this, she forces Emily into the wall knocking her to the ground. As Emily wakes up a little, Patty forces medicated water into her mouth trying to hurt her. Later, Patty colors Emily's hair so it matches hers and escapes her cell with her hair covered. Back in the cell, Paul, Patty's brother, found Emily (believing it to be Patty) unresponsive on her cell bed. Emily gets rushed to the hospital. Paul calls Patty (thinking it's Emily) to come to the hospital. Patty fakes her identity and is on the road to marry her longed husband Jack making Jack think she's Emily.

While Emily is in grave condition and near death and is revealed comatose, Jack instead unwittingly married Patty on Valentine's Day, thinking that she was Emily. Patty's other brother Todd, a priest, also unwittingly performed the ceremony. Emily wakes up from her coma and tries to convince Paul and her doctor she is Emily, not Patty, but they do not believe her.

Jack, Paul, and Heather discover that Patty has been impersonating Emily and they rush to the sanitarium to get her. Patty, knowing full well that her lies had been revealed, went to the cell and took Emily's place again. She gave the real Emily a shot that would make her seem to be dead and barely have a pulse, Patty then wheeled her down to the morgue and left a Jane Doe tag on her foot. On May 10, Jack is with Patty in the cell and he figures out what Patty did because he could smell the peroxide and see the cat scratch she had. He begged with her to tell him where Emily is and all Patty said was "she's gone" and Jack ran down to the morgue and found her body about to be cut open for an autopsy, Jack was crying and thought she was dead until he saw a tear run down her cheek. She then wakes up and they go to Patty's cell where Patty is about to commit suicide and Emily talks her out of it. Jack then takes Emily to the hospital. Emily and Jack share a tearful farewell as Emily states that she will be moving away from Genoa City, most likely back to Minneapolis, where she lived and worked before her arrival.

Months later it was revealed during one of Tucker McCall's therapy sessions, that his psychiatrist was in fact Emily, who returned a little more than a year after leaving. Emily has been revealed to have been living in Chicago, prior to her return to Genoa City. She then runs into Paul Williams, who believes, at first, that she is Patty. While still in town, Emily goes to visit Jack, who also thought at first she was Patty, and Emily had to prove to him that she was Emily. After their visit ended, she presumably returned to Chicago.

In January 2012, Patty began posing as Emily again to attempt to win Jack away from Genevieve Atkinson (Genie Francis), his fiancée. However, Jack turns "Emily" down, telling her he loves Genevieve. Patty plans to shoot Genevieve, whom she had been working for as a housekeeper for months before under the alias Myrna Murdock. However, Patty arrives at Genevieve's house only to find that she is writing him a Dear John letter all before leaving town. Meanwhile, Tucker, who had spoken to someone he thought was Emily earlier that day, discovers the real Emily at Crimson Lights, who arrived in town for a psychiatrist conference. Emily discovers that Patty has been impersonating her once again. She later confronts Patty at the police station, though Patty is soon imprisoned in a mental facility. Emily has not been seen since; she presumably returned home to Chicago.

== Others ==
Date(s)	Character	Actor	Information
March 6 – August 27, 2002	Maxwell Hollister	Sam Behrens	In March 2002, Victor Newman (Eric Braeden) offered to buy his ex-wife's company, Martins Designs, from Maxwell. When he refused the offer, Victor threatened to run him out of business and he signed the purchase agreement. He then appeared on Leanna Love's (Barbara Crampton) television show and spoke about Victor, worrying Nikki Newman (Melody Thomas Scott). Lorie Brooks (Jaime Lyn Bauer) was then revealed to be Maxwell's estranged wife, and because she is Victor's ex-lover, she joined his plot against him. However, when Victor and Lorie sorted out their differences, Maxwell's plan was ruined, and he left Genoa City.
February 14, 2003 – February 23, 2006	Sierra Hoffman	Asia Ray Smith	Sierra first appeared in 2003 when she joined Lily Winters (Christel Khalil) and Colleen Carlton (Lyndsy Fonseca) as a part of the younger scene in Genoa City. She attended the Walnut Grove Academy with them and went to Genoa City University afterward. She was always there whenever her friends needed help, most notably when Lily was involved with Kevin Fisher (Greg Rikaart) and when Colleen had relationship problems. She also was there for Lily when she went on the run with her other boyfriend, Daniel Romalotti (Michael Graziadei). Sierra even gave advice to the young Cassie Newman (Camryn Grimes). Sierra developed a relationship with Devon Hamilton (Bryton James) after supporting him during his troubled years of dealing with his drug-addicted mother. Sierra made her final appearance in 2006, without a proper exit.
October 29, 2003 – March 31, 2004	Vanessa Lerner	Dawn Stern	Vanessa arrived in Genoa City looking for her ex-lover, Damon Porter (Keith Hamilton Cobb), to persuade him to hunt for an orchid that she discovered would straighten hair. Vanessa traveled with Damon to Japan at the same time that Drucilla and Neil Winters (Victoria Rowell and Kristoff St. John) were getting married. They found themselves on the same plane as the couple, as well as Phyllis Summers and Jack Abbott (Michelle Stafford and Peter Bergman). Damon and Vanessa secretly went looking for the orchid, eventually finding it in Drucilla's wedding bouquet. Somehow, the others found out about the orchid, and Phyllis ended up stealing it. Phyllis and Jack consequently broke up, Damon and Phyllis became lovers. Their relationship angered Vanessa to the point where she decided to offer her entire orchid project to Newman Enterprises.
February 16 – May 14, 2004	Shiloh	Julie Pinson	When Colleen Carlton (Lyndsy Fonseca) arranged for her boyfriend J.T. Hellstrom (Thad Luckinbill) to sing at Crimson Lights, J.T. wasn't aware that a record promoter named Shiloh was in the audience. She was so impressed with his performance that she offered him a contract, and the two left to Los Angeles to make J.T. a singing star. Shiloh asked J.T. to change a part of his personality to be a better star. Colleen was hurt when J.T. said at a press conference that he was single on Shiloh's orders. Shiloh prepared a record release party for J.T., but he did not attend.
August 2004, July 2006	Alex	Nick Chastain	In August 2004, Alex was approached by Kevin Fisher (Greg Rikaart) and Daniel Romalotti (Michael Graziadei) with a plot to hurt Lily Winters (Christel Khalil); however, the plot was only for Kevin to save Lily and look like a hero. Alex slipped Lily the date rape drug, and while he left town soon after, he returned to blackmail Kevin and Daniel but was stopped by Daniel's mother, Phyllis Summers (Michelle Stafford). Alex briefly reappeared in July 2006, looking for money to keep quiet about Kevin and Daniel's plot. While they paid him off, Alex continued to blackmail them until Kevin's mother Gloria Fisher (Judith Chapman) and Jana Hawkes (Emily O'Brien) gained material against him. He disappeared from Genoa City soon after.
December 16, 2004 – May 23, 2005	Adrienne Markham	Lisa Canning	Adrienne was married to Damon Porter (Keith Hamilton Cobb) in 1990s, and they had a son, Elias, who was killed by Dominic Hughes (Kevin Alejandro). After Elias's death Adrienne and Damon's marriage fell apart; they divorced and she moved to Africa. In 2004, Adrienne arrived in Genoa City, after spending all that time in Africa getting over the tragedy of losing her son. While in town, Adrienne briefly dated Malcolm Winters (Shemar Moore). By 2005, Damon and Adrienne had reunited, and they decide to move back to Atlanta for a fresh start.
June 11 – October 30, 2007	Logan Armstrong	Deanna Russo	While hiking in the woods on a remote island, student doctor Logan Armstrong discovered an injured Nicholas Newman (Joshua Morrow), who was in a plane crash. Logan took him back to her cabin, where she nursed him back to health before bringing him back to Genoa City. Logan stayed in Genoa City for a few months; she went out on a few dates with Brad Carlton (Don Diamont). Logan shared with Brad the tragic story of when she, her late husband, and two sons were involved in a car accident. She was the only one who survived, with the rest of her family tragically dying. Logan took a job working with Genoa City Memorial Hospital, but she left the job and Brad to join "Doctors Without Borders" in Malawi.
July 13 – September 13, 2007	Carson MacDonald	Marsh Mokhtari	Carson arrived in Genoa City claiming to be a war soldier. He later kidnapped Amber Moore (Adrienne Frantz), also threatening her and her friends, Kevin Fisher (Greg Rikaart) and Daniel Romalotti (Michael Graziadei) to give him money which they found. He left town soon after.
May 9, 2008 – August 14, 2009	Estella Muñoz	Anne Betancourt	Estella became the head of the staff at the Newman ranch in May 2008. She held this position until the following year, at which time she was transferred briefly to Newman Enterprises before being fired completely due to ongoing conflict involving Ashley Abbott (Eileen Davidson). Estella was known as having a friendly relationship with Victor's wife Sabrina Costelana (Raya Meddine), who was killed in a car crash in August 2008. Her relationship with Ashley, with whom Victor had renewed his relationship, had been much more contentious. In the spring of 2009, Ashley was being "haunted" by the spirit of Sabrina, and often confronted Estella about being the one who was trying to make her believe Sabrina was still alive. With evidence mounting against her—plotted by Adam Newman (Michael Muhney)—Estella was permanently fired by the Newmans and left Genoa City.
July 25, 2008 – August 2009	Gil Wallace	Cassius Willis	Gil Wallace was a detective with the Genoa City Police Department. He was first seen working on the case of the suspicious car accident deaths of David Chow (Vincent Irizarry) and Sabrina Costelana (Raya Meddine). He handled other cases as well and eventually developed a relationship with Tyra Hamilton (Eva Marcille), but it did not last after Gil had to report to the Child Care Authorities that Ana Hamilton (Jamia Simone Nash) wasn't Tyra's daughter and Ana had to be put into foster care.

== See also ==
- The Young and the Restless characters (1970s)
- The Young and the Restless characters (1980s)
- The Young and the Restless characters (1990s)
- The Young and the Restless characters (2010s)
