= List of The Young and the Restless characters introduced in 2021 =

The Young and the Restless is an American CBS soap opera which debuted on March 26, 1973. This is a list of its characters that debuted in 2021, in order of first appearance. Meredith (Evelina Martinez), the caregiver of Chelsea Lawson (Melissa Claire Egan), debuted in January, as did specialist Lena Cavett (Dana Sparks). Tara Locke, a woman that Kyle Abbott (Michael Mealor) had had an affair with, was introduced in March, with her husband, Ashland (Richard Burgi/Robert Newman) debuting later that month. Sutton Ames, played by Jack Landrón, debuted in April, followed by Harrison (Kellen Enriquez/Redding Munsell), the son of Tara and Kyle, in May. Detective Denise Tolliver (Telma Hopkins) made her first appearance in June, with Danny and KJ, played by father and son Keith Carlos and Keith Carlos, Jr, respectively, also making their appearance that month. Jesse Gaines (Jamison Jones) made his first appearance in September, whilst Kim Dunaway, played by Roxanne Hart, debuted in November. Additionally, several other characters appeared throughout the year.

== Meredith ==
Meredith, played by Evelina Martinez, made her first appearance on January 6, 2021, remaining until April 2021. Meredith was introduced as the caregiver of Chelsea Lawson (Melissa Claire Egan). In real life, Martinez is a close friend of Egan. The two enjoyed working together and found it fun, with Martinez writing on Instagram, "Chelsea is well taken care of!!! Nurse Meredith is on her side", whilst Egan wrote "How lucky am I that my dear friend Evelina Martinez was cast as my nurse! She's fantastic!" Candace Young from Soaps She Knows found the casting to be "something of a trend" due to Egan's husband, Matt Katrosar, having played two roles in 2020 on the soap, which was due to COVID-19 social distancing guidelines.

Meredith is the personal nurse of Chelsea, who takes care of her when she is immobilized from a stroke. She later becomes Chelsea's sole caregiver but moves out when she quits, with Chelsea's best friend, Chloe Mitchell (Elizabeth Hendrickson), taking over.

== Lena Cavett ==
Lena Cavett, played by Dana Sparks, made her first appearance on January 7, 2021, and made multiple appearance throughout the year in a recurring role. She is introduced as a specialist who works with stroke patients. Sparks wrote on Instagram that she was happy to be cast on the soap. Sparks has described the character as "kind" but "direct", as well as very grounded and in a very understanding, compassionate way". Sparks added "I play her as doing the best she can to help the situation, whether it's being honest or encouraging". Sparks had previously appeared on another soap opera, Passions, from 1999 to 2007.

Adam Newman (Mark Grossman) hires Lena, a specialist doctor, to help with the recovery Chelsea Lawson (Melissa Claire Egan), who has suffered a stroke and cannot move or speak. Lena promises to be straightforward about Chelsea's prognosis and later tells Chelsea to not get discouraged, though she avoids answering Adam's question about the likelihood of Chelsea recovering. When Chelsea does not show improvement, Lena suggests to Adam that depression might be hindering Chelsea's process, and recommends a psychiatrist. It is later revealed that Chelsea is making progress on her own but is tricking Lena into thinking she is still immobile.

== Tara Locke ==
Tara Locke
- The Young and the Restless character
- Portrayed by: Elizabeth Leiner
- First appearance: March 1, 2021
- Last appearance: August 6, 2021
- Introduced by: Anthony Morina and Josh Griffith
In-universe information
- Occupation: Shoe designer
- Brothers: Shane
- Husband: Ashland Locke
- Sons: Harrison Locke

Tara Locke, portrayed by Elizabeth Leiner, made her first appearance on March 1, 2021. Rebekah Graf was initially hired to portray the role, but the role was recast with Leiner due to scheduling conflicts. She was introduced as the married woman that Kyle Abbott (Michael Mealor) had had an affair with, which produced a son, Harrison (Kellen Enriquez). Amy Mistretta from Soaps She Knows speculated that Tara's arrival could "Blow Kyle's World Apart" and "put a damper" on Kyle and his girlfriend Summer Newman (Hunter King)'s "ongoing quest for a bright future". Harrison and Tara's and husband Ashland (Richard Burgi/Robert Newman) were later introduced. Tara left the show when the character was arrested for stealing, with Leiner making her last appearance on August 6, 2021.

Richard Simms from Soaps She Knows put Tara on his list of the most hated soap opera characters, commenting that "Although she hit Genoa City with a legendarily malevolent husband, adorable moppet and lust-filled backstory, Elizabeth Leiner's Young & Restless alter ego was soon reduced to a Kyle-obsessed vixen who wasn't really all that vixenish." Charlie Mason from the same website criticised Tara's writing and characterisation, saying that the character was given "no edge" and that the show transformed her from "hot new love-to-hate character" to a character he could not "be bothered to care" about. Mason noted that the character was supposed to be "seductive", "intriguing" and "vixen" and that it was not Lanier's fault. Mason also criticised the revelation that Tara was embezzling from her own company. Mason and Simms named Tara as the "Biggest Waste of a Character" of 2021 in American soap operas, writing that the character had "potential to be a supervixen on par with old-school Jill or Lauren", but instead was written "with all the flair of a limp dishrag, rendering her about as interesting as a paperweight (and as likely to scheme her way out of a tight spot)" to the point that "no one even cared enough to cheer" when she was written out.

== Ashland Locke ==
Ashland Locke
- The Young and the Restless character
- Portrayed by: Richard Burgi (2021–22); Robert Newman (2022)
- Duration: 2021–22
- First appearance: March 11, 2021
- Last appearance: July 26, 2022
- Introduced by: Anthony Morina and Josh Griffith
In-universe information
- Occupation: Businessman; CEO
- Wife: Tara Locke (until 2021); Victoria Newman (2021–22)
- Stepsons: Harrison Locke; Reed Hellstrom; Johnny Abbott
- Stepdaughters: Katie Abbott

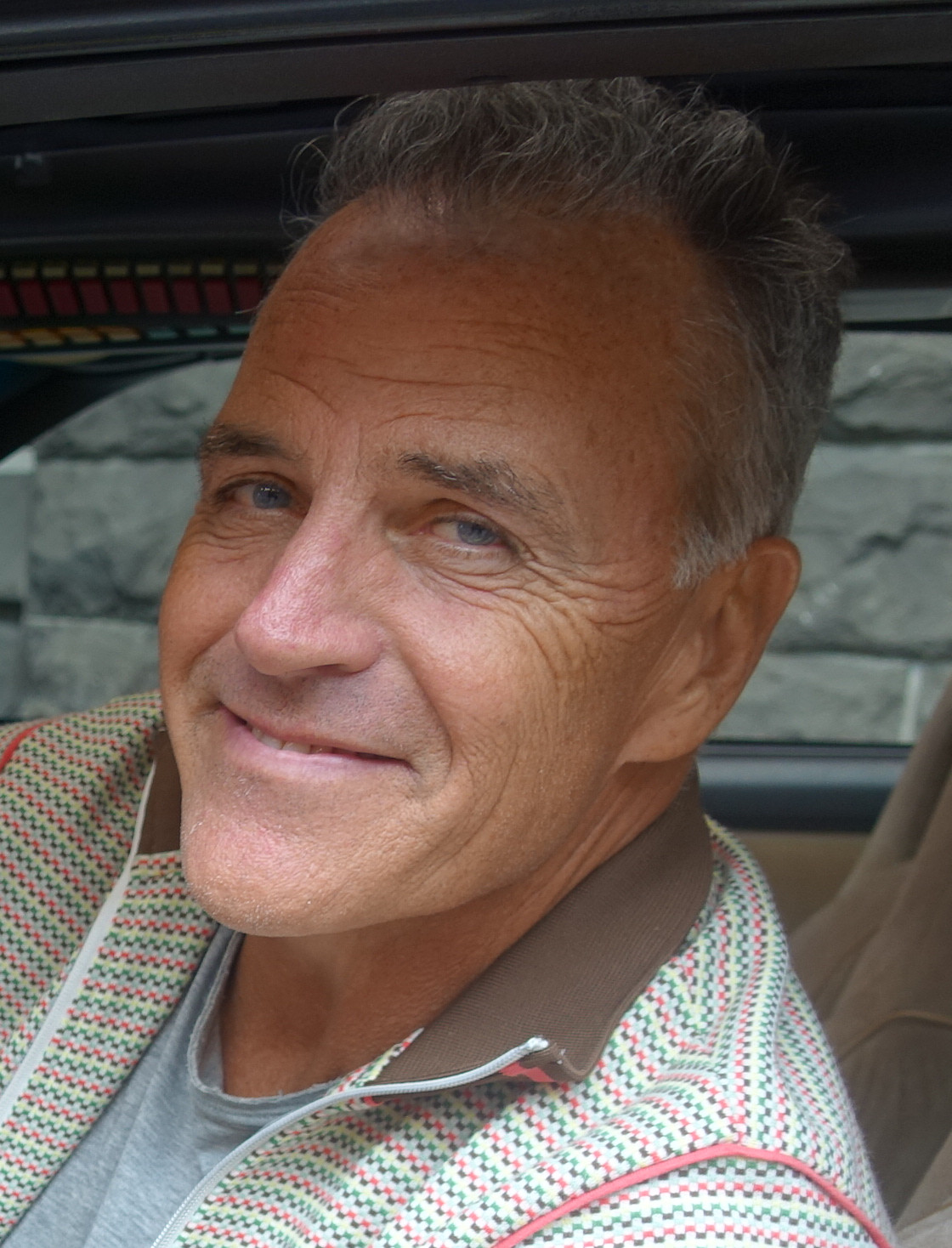
Richard Burgi portrayed Ashland before being recast.

Ashland Locke made his first appearance on March 11, 2021, played by Richard Burgi in a recurring role. The character was referred to as an "uber successful tycoon with a reputation for being a shrewd businessman", who comes to town to oversee a bidding war between the Abbotts and the Newmans. The character was recast with Robert Newman in 2022. It was later reported that Burgi had been let go for violating the soap opera's COVID-19 policy, which he said was inadvertent. In July 2022, Newman exited the role, with the actor confirming the news on social media and thanking his fans. Of his exit, Newman told fans, "I very much enjoyed playing the character, and I hope you enjoyed seeing me in the role. I know for some of you, it was a tough transition from Richard's [Burgi] work, but I really, really enjoyed playing the character and working with these fantastic people". Ashland departed after being killed off in a fight with Nicholas Newman (Joshua Morrow).

Prior to his introduction, Amy Mistretta from Soaps She Knows referred to the character as a "ruthless business mogul". Richard Simms from the same website referred to Ashland as a "legendarily malevolent husband". Simms, alongside Charlie Mason, later wrote that Ashland was the "Second-Best New Character" of 2021 in American soap operas, calling him the "Locke Ness Monster", but wanted the soap to show "just how bad Richard Burgi's Big Bad is instead of merely telling us over and over again that he's powerful and scary". The following year, they called Burgi's firing from the soap as the "Biggest Shock, On Screen" of 2022 in American soap operas. Following the news of the recast, Mason noted that whilst it was a "bummer" that Burgi had departed, the soap "couldn't have picked a finer successor for him than Newman". Mason also noted that Ashland and Victoria's pairing was one of The Young and the Restless' "biggest successes of 2021". Simms referred to Burgi's departure as a "twist nobody saw coming" and noted that Burgi had joined the soap to "great fanfare", as well as noting that the "unexpected pairing" of Ashland and Victoria "almost immediately caught fire" rather than a love triangle between Tara, Kyle and Summer. However, Mason and Simms later placed Ashland as the "Least-Missed Character" of 2022, writing:

Maybe it was the fact that Young & Restless' Ashland didn't live up to his pre-introduction hype. Maybe it was that the part had to be recast mid-story. Or maybe it was that even in death, he remained the most talked about person in town. As the saying goes, "How can I miss you if you won't actually leave?"

== Sutton Ames ==
Sutton Ames
- The Young and the Restless character
- Portrayed by: Jack Landrón
- First appearance: April 5, 2021
- Last appearance: November 3, 2021
- Introduced by: Anthony Morina and Josh Griffith
In-universe information
- Daughters: Naya Benedict
- Granddaughters: Hilary Curtis; Amanda Sinclair; Imani Benedict
- Aunts: Florence
- Nieces: Rose Turner

Sutton Ames, played by Jack Landrón, made his first appearance on April 5. His casting was announced the previous month. Sutton was introduced as the father of established character Naya Benedict (Ptosha Storey) and the grandfather of Hilary Curtis (Mishael Morgan), Amanda Sinclair (Morgan) and Imani Benedict (Leigh-Ann Rose).

Sutton is part of a powerful politician family and he forced Naya to give away her twins Hilary and Amanda. Years later, he is accused of causing the death of the twins' father, Richard Nealon, who died in a car crash. Naya asks Amanda, a lawyer, to represent Sutton, which she agrees to. Amanda later meets Sutton and is angry at him for making Naya give her and Hilary up. Sutton understands her anger but says he does not regret his decision. Amanda warns him that she can lose the case as she has not worked in criminal law before. Sutton reveals that he followed Amanda and Hilary's lives and careers and is impressed with what they accomplished, and suggests that taking on his case will help her career and give her a chance to get to know her family. Amanda and Sutton agree the keep the relation private. A few weeks later, Sutton is impressed with Amanda's work and invites her to his house to meet the rest of the family, with Amanda emotionally accepts. She has a lovely time and Sutton gifts her some photos, and tells off Naya for not spending time with Amanda.

Sutton gets frustrated at Amanda for not following the defence strategy that he wants. When Amanda learns that Richard knew she existed and went looking for, Amanda starts to suspect that Sutton is hiding something and ends up dropping the case when she realises that Sutton really was behind Richard's death. Naya turns herself in and Amanda becomes determined to make Sutton face justice. With the help of Victor Newman (Eric Braeden), Amanda is able to get a confession from Sutton, who is arrested for his crimes. Sutton later visits Amanda at her home and asks for leniency, which she refuses. Sutton tries to record Amanda saying that she got him arrested as a grudge against him in order to discredit her in court, but Amanda gets the recording and gives it to the DA. Sutton is later found guilty of his crimes and sent to prison.

Chris Eades from Soaps In Depth noted that the character has a "whole lot of complicated backstory".

== Harrison Locke ==
Harrison Locke
- The Young and the Restless character
- Portrayed by: Kellen Enriquez (2021–2024); Redding Munsell (2024–present)
- Duration: 2021–present
- First appearance: May 14, 2021
- Created by: Josh Griffith
- Introduced by: Anthony Morina and Josh Griffith
In-universe information
- Other names: Harrison Abbott
- Father: Kyle Abbott
- Mother: Tara Locke
- Adoptive mother: Summer Newman
- Stepfather: Ashland Locke
- Grandfathers: Jack Abbott; Nicholas Newman (adoptive)
- Grandmothers: Diane Jenkins; Phyllis Summers (adoptive)
- Uncles: Keemo Volien Abbott; John Abbott III; Shane; Noah Newman (adoptive); Daniel Romalotti (adoptive)
- Aunts: Cassie Newman (adoptive); Faith Newman (adoptive)
- First cousins: Allie Nguyen; Lucy Romalotti (adoptive)
- Other relatives: Ashley Abbott; Traci Abbott; Billy Abbott; Abby Newman

Harrison Abbott (also Locke) made his first appearance on May 14, 2021, played by Kellen Enriquez. The character has been referenced earlier that year when it was revealed that he is the biological son of Kyle Abbott (Michael Mealor) and Tara Locke (Elizabeth Leiner), though Harrison had grown up believing Tara's husband, Ashland (Richard Burgi/Robert Newman), was his father. It was reported that Harrison's debut could force Kyle to publicly announce that he is Harrison's biological father. The character departed later that year but returned in 2022, following the departure of Mealor. In 2024, the role was recast with Redding Munsell, who made his first appearance on April 12 of that year.

Years after Harrison is conceived, Kyle confronts Tara, knowing that Harrison looks like him and that Tara was not having sex with her husband, Ashland, when they had the affair. Tara admits that she had a DNA test done which confirmed that Kyle is the father. Tara tells Kyle to not tell Ashland about Harrison. Over the months, Tara tells Kyle things about Harrison and shows him pictures before eventually introducing him to Kyle and his fiancée, Summer Newman (Hunter King/Allison Lanier).

In 2021, Candace Young from Soaps She Knows called Harrison a "Cutie Patootie" and believed it was "safe to assume" that Harrison's debut would cause "some amount of upheaval". Michelle Moro Parkerton from Soaps In Depth called Harrison a "sweet little boy" with "adorable curls" and noted that he had "certainly been a hot topic of conversation" even prior to his first appearance.

== Denise Tolliver ==
Denise Tolliver, played by Telma Hopkins, made her first appearance on June 1. Denise is a detective who comes to deliver "shocking information" about the past of Amanda Sinclair (Mishael Morgan). Hopkins was reunited with her co-star Bryton James, who plays Devon Hamilton, as they played mother and son in the 1990s in the sitcom Family Matters.

== Danny and KJ ==
Danny and KJ, played by father and son Keith Carlos and Keith Carlos, Jr, respectively, appeared on June 14, 2021. Keith Carlos had previously recurred as Danny, a bartender, on sister soap The Bold and the Beautiful, in 2018 and 2019.

Danny and KJ meet Kyle Abbott (Michael Mealor) and his son Harrison Locke (Kellen Enriquez) in the park, with Danny explaining that he is town visiting his parents. Harrison and KJ play tag with some other children, with KJ saying that there is joy in seeing your children have fun.

Richard Simms from Soaps She Knows called Danny's "subtle" crossover a twist that he "Never Saw Coming", and speculated whether Danny may be connected to other characters in The Young and the Restless due to Danny mentioning that he is visiting his parents.

== Jesse Gaines ==
Jesse Gaines, played by Jamison Jones, made his first appearance on September 21. His casting was announced earlier that month by Soap Opera Digest, and it was revealed that Jesse would help give a "little insight" into the past of Ashland Locke (Richard Burgi). Jones, who had appeared on other soap operas, appeared in a recurring role as Jesse, and it was hinted that the character would be the "key" in exposing Ashland. Amy Mistretta from Soaps She Knows questioned whether Jesse would be a "friend of foe" and whether his presence would lead to Ashland "scrambling to hide the truth".

Jesse used to be a lawyer but got his license revoked for malpractice, so he began to blackmail Ashland. A month before his wedding to Victoria Newman (Amelia Heinle), Jesse starts texting Ashland and the two meet up, where it is revealed that Ashland has been paying Jesse $300,000 annually for years due to the blackmail. Having heard about Ashland's illness, Jesse wants to secure having a lavish lifestyle after Ashland's death and demands $3 million from him. Ashland reluctantly agrees, not wanting his secret to be exposed. Billy Abbott (Jason Thompson) offers to pay Jesse for information on Ashland, but Victor Newman (Eric Braeden) stops this and pays Jesse off. Jesse then abruptly leaves town and is untraceable, but Billy's investigators manage to find him. Billy brings Jesse back to Genoa City, offering him protection and money if exposes Ashland's secret. Jesse reveals that his father forged a letter so that Ashland could inherit the estate of Camilla Rhodes.

Jesse escapes and is found by Victoria's brother, Nicholas Newman (Joshua Morrow), who locks him in a room when he reveals everything. Jesse records a video exposing Ashland's secret and sends it to him, saying that he will release the video within an hour. Victor and Adam Newman (Mark Grossman) take Jesse and lock him in a storage room. With Jesse missing, Billy believes that Victor and Adam have done something to him. Jesse then arrives at Billy's apartment and tells him how they had locked him up. Billy is unsure whether to believe him, so he keeps him in an apartment.

== Kim Dunaway ==
Kim Dunaway, played by Roxanne Hart, made her first appearance on November 18. Hart's casting in the recurring role was announced earlier that month by Soap Opera Digest, with it being reported that Kim would "hold the key to a mystery that unfolds". A writer from TV Seasons & Spoilers revealed that the character would be part of some "puzzling storylines".

Kim and her husband, Errol, are medics who worked in Chance Chancellor's (Conner Floyd) in Iraq. They are close to Chance and think of him as their child. When Chance is missing, his wife, Abby Newman (Melissa Ordway) calls the couple, who have retired in Spain. Kim pretends that she has not heard from him but later calls Abby back. Abby goes to Kim's house in Spain to meet Chance, who had gone there to hide and recover after surviving an explosion. Abby later asks Kim to lie and say that Chance is not well enough to continue his mission but Kim refuses, not wanting to deceive Chance.

Chris Eades from Soaps In Depth speculated that Kim would be related to the mystery of what happened to Chance, though she also speculated that she may have information on Ashland Locke (Richard Burgi). Amy Mistretta from Soaps She Knows also speculated that Kim would be related to Chance or Ashland, as well as suggesting that she may be connected to Gaines, and wrote that she was looking forward to seeing how the mystery "unfolds".

== Others ==
Character	Episode date(s)	Portrayer	Details	Ref
Dr Coleman	January 18	Laurine Price	The OB-GYN of Abby Newman (Melissa Ordway) who tells Abby that she is unable to carry a child due to the intensive scarring from her miscarriage in 2016. Abby's father, Victor Newman (Eric Braeden), wants a second opinion but Abby says that she trusts Dr Coleman's opinion as she been her patient for years.	
Wayne	April 16	Donald Bowen	A teenager who attends the same school as Faith Newman (Reylynn Caster) and Moses Winters (Jacob Aaron Gaines). He is angry that Jordan (Madison Thompson) has been expelled as he needs her study notes. When Faith returns from the hospital, he calls her a loser, but Moses stands up to him, which causes a speechless Wayne to leave.	
Dr Hedges	May 11–June 15	Michael Bofshever	A man who Victor Newman (Eric Braeden) pays to pretend to assess the mental state of Chelsea Lawson (Melissa Claire Egan), who has faked having a psychotic breakdown. Dr Hedges feels uncomfortable with lying but Victor assures him he will be paid accordingly. Chelsea discovers that Victor is using the doctor to keep her in the mental hospital. Chelsea later tricks Dr Hedges into admitting that he is being paid by Victor on a recording and demands to be released from the hospital, threatening to send the recording to his supervisors and have him fired. However, this risks exposing the fact that Chelsea faked her mental breakdown with his help, though Victor is able to get Chelsea out eventually.	
Angelina Marchetti	June 18–July 30	Cristina Serafini	Angelina is the owner of a successful fashion company, Marchetti, in Italy. Sally Spectra (Courtney Hope) schemes to get rid of Summer Newman (Hunter King) by getting her a job there. Angelina calls Summer to offers her a position there and later calls to follow up on her decision. Angelina later meets with Phyllis Summers (Michelle Stafford) and Eric Forrester (John McCook) when they want to find out how Summer got the job there. The following year, Angelina sells the company, which is suffering financially, to Jabot and retires.	
Tyler	July 8 and 9	Christian Telesmar	A man who escorts and looks after Chelsea Lawson (Melissa Claire Egan) when they take a trip to the park from the Mental Hospital that Chelsea has been staying at. Tyler allows Chelsea to spend extra time in the park.	
Tigirlily Gold (Kendra and Krista Slaubaugh)	July 22	Themselves	Kendra and Kirsta are a music duo that Faith Newman (Reylynn Caster) is a big fan of. Knowing how much Faith loves them, Moses Winters (Jacob Aaron Gaines), with the help of Devon Hamilton (Bryton James), arranges Faith to meet the duo at the coffee shop Crimson Lights. Faith tells Krista and Kendra how she discovered their music when she was going through a difficult time, and they invite her and Moses to watch their charity concert from backstage. They also take a photo with Faith and give her and Moses a preview of one of their upcoming songs, leaving Faith very happy.	
