= Kyle Abbott (The Young and the Restless) =

Fictional character from The Young and the Restless

- The Young and the Restless character
- Michael Mealor as Kyle Abbott
- Portrayed by: Garrett Ryan (2010–2012); Blake Hood (2012–2013); Hartley Sawyer (2013–2014); Lachlan Buchanan (2015–2016); Michael Mealor (2018–present); (and child actors)
- Duration: 2001–2004; 2010–2016; 2018–present
- First appearance: January 8, 2001
- Created by: Kay Alden and Trent Jones
- Introduced by: Edward J. Scott (2001); Maria Arena Bell and Paul Rauch (2010); Jill Farren Phelps and Charles Pratt, Jr. (2015); Mal Young (2018); Anthony Morina and Josh Griffith (2022); Michele Val Jean and Tracey Thomson (2026) (Note: In addition to Michele Val Jean and Tracey Thomson, other executive producers for Beyond the Gates include Sheila Ducksworth, Lela Coffey, Anna Saalfeld, Julie Hanan Carruthers, Leon W. Russell, and Derrick Johnson.)
- Crossover appearances: Beyond the Gates (2026)
- Lachlan Buchanan as Kyle Abbott

- Garrett Ryan as Kyle Abbott
In-universe information
- Other names: Christian Newman; Timothy Bilton; Kyle Jenkins
- Occupation: Business executive; Ordained minister
- Parents: Jack Abbott; Diane Jenkins
- Half-brothers: Keemo Volien Abbott; John Abbott III
- Spouse: Summer Newman (2019, 2021–2024); Lola Rosales (2019–2020)
- Children: Harrison Abbott
- Grandfathers: Kyle Jenkins; John Abbott
- Grandmothers: Dina Mergeron
- Aunts and uncles: Ashley Abbott; Traci Abbott; Billy Abbott; Eric Vanderway
- Nieces: Allie Nguyen
- First cousins: Colleen Carlton; Abby Newman; Delia Abbott; Johnny Abbott; Katie Newman; Theo Vanderway

Kyle Abbott is a fictional character from The Young and the Restless, an American soap opera on the CBS network. Introduced on January 8, 2001, the character is the son of businessman Jack Abbott (Peter Bergman) and Diane Jenkins (Susan Walters). For the character's first three-year run, he was portrayed by a series of infant toddler actors. In 2010, the character returned, portrayed as slightly older by child actor Garrett Ryan. After two years, he was rapidly aged to an adult, with Blake Hood stepping into the role in April 2012. Upon his return, Kyle began dating Eden Baldwin (Jessica Heap).

In March 2013, after a year in the role, Hood was let go and announced to be replaced by Hartley Sawyer. The soap opera had initially issued a casting call for a character named Connor Boyd, and due to his characteristics resembling that of Kyle, his casting was kept quiet. Hood stated that his ouster came as a shock to him. Sawyer made his debut on April 24, 2013. The character's six-year absence was criticized, and his age upon his 2010 return received unfavorable reviews. Hood was positively received in the role, and the decision to release him and replace him with Sawyer has also been criticized. Australian actor Lachlan Buchanan took claim of the role in 2015, making his first appearance on February 25 and departing on April 26, 2016. The role is presently portrayed by Michael Mealor, who played the role from March 29, 2018, to August 6, 2021, reprising the role briefly that October and March 2022 before returning full-time in April 2022.

== Casting ==
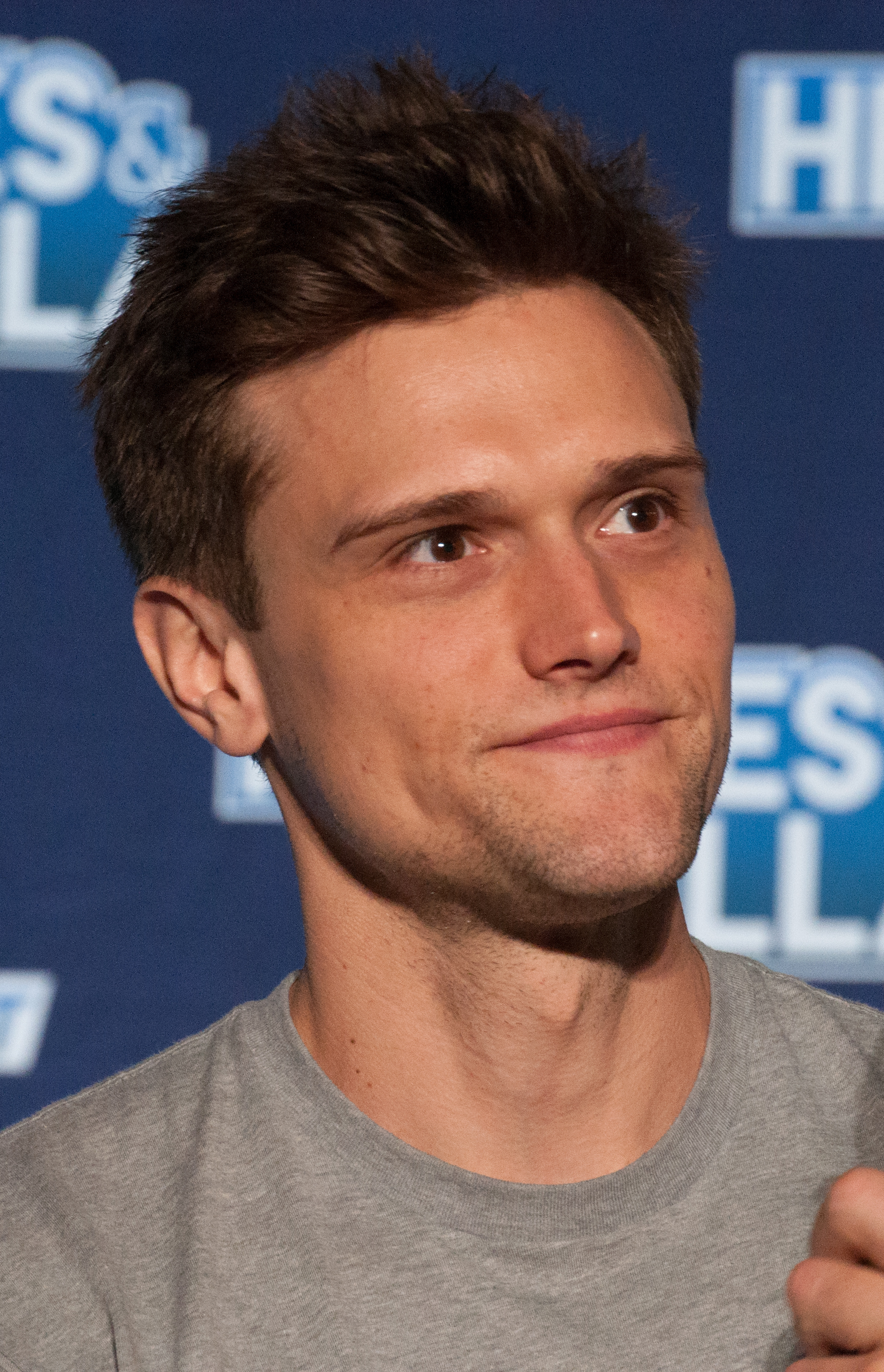
Hartley Sawyer was cast in the role in 2013 before being let go nine months after his debut.

The role was originally portrayed by two sets of twins, Connor and Garret Sullivan and Marissa and Madison Poer from 2001 to 2002, and twins Cooper and Oliver Guynes in 2002. Seth Stern portrayed the role in 2004. Following the character's return after a 6-year absence, the role was assumed by Garrett Ryan on February 25, 2010. He initially departed after two episodes, though returned as a recurring cast member eight months later on October 12, 2010. When asked at the 38th Daytime Emmy Awards if he was remaining with the series, Ryan replied: "Um, yes. I'm definitely sticking around on the show. I've been on a lot lately..." Ryan was last seen as Kyle on January 5, 2012.

In March 2012, the character was rapidly aged, with Blake Hood cast to portray Kyle as an adult. He was previously known for his role of Mark Driscott on The CW's 90210. Hood debuted on April 27, 2012. Hood was surprised at how fast the process of soap operas where, and also credited Peter Bergman (who plays his on-screen father, Jack) as being very "gracious" and kind to him, lending experience. In March 2013, after a year in the role, Hood was let go and replaced with Hartley Sawyer. The soap opera had issued a casting call for a character named "Connor Boyd" in January and, due to the character sounding very much like Kyle, Sawyer's casting was kept quiet. Casting directors used a scene previously been performed by Noah Newman to recast the character. Hood stated his ouster and replacement came as a shock to him. Sawyer made his debut on April 24, 2013.

In December, it was announced that Sawyer had been let go from the role eight months after a debut. He made his last appearance on January 27, 2014. In January 2015, it was announced that Australian actor Lachlan Buchanan had been cast in the role, and he debuted on February 25, 2015. In October, a representative for the soap opera confirmed that Buchanan had been dropped to a recurring status, but would continue to make appearances in the role. In March 2016, it was revealed that after months of being on recurring, Buchanan had been dismissed from the role; he last appeared on April 26, 2016.

In January 2018, it was announced that The Young and the Restless was "actively" working to recast the role of Kyle. On March 1, 2018, it was announced that Michael Mealor had been cast in the role of Kyle. He made his first appearance on March 29, 2018, in celebration of the soap's 45th anniversary. After weeks of speculation, in July 2021, Mealor announced his exit from the serial through social media. Mealor last aired, alongside Hunter King on August 6, 2021.

Days later, it was reported that King and Mealor would briefly return to the show; they made their appearances for October 12 to 15, 2021. Mealor briefly appeared on March 15, 2022; that same month, it was announced that he would return as a regular. Mealor returned on April 25, 2022.

On January 27, 2026, it was announced Mealor would crossover to Beyond the Gates as Kyle. This event is scheduled to air from June 9 to June 12 of the same year.

== Character development ==
Ryan described Kyle as being a "little brat" but noted that it was "fun to play". Following Kyle being rapidly aged and returning to town, Hood stated that his new agenda was to "be close to his dad and move on with his life". However, Hood talked about how Kyle's goal to "live a happy full life" may not happen because he just happened to have "stepped into this situation where the woman who killed his mother is still here." Kyle was "less than pleased" that his father Jack was re-developing a relationship with his ex-wife Nikki, who killed his mother in self-defense. Hood further said: "What’s great is that [Kyle’s] come back and [is] so much older now. It really feels like I can do whatever I want with the character ... [Kyle] hasn’t seen these people in 15 years or so."

== Storylines ==
=== 2001–04 ===
Kyle was born with the name Christian Victor Newman on January 8, 2001. His mother Diane learned that her ex-husband, Victor Newman, had his sperm frozen, and when she obtained it she had herself artificially inseminated to carry Victor's child, and she later gave birth and told him he was the father. In reality, Diane's nemesis Nikki Newman had switched the sperm sample, and she was shocked to discover it was that of Jack. Soon after, she renamed the baby Kyle. Jack sued for sole custody of Kyle but lost, but once Diane burned down the Abbott poolhouse and tried to frame Jack's wife Phyllis Summers for it, he and Phyllis obtained custody of Kyle. However, Jack eventually gave Kyle back to Diane, and they moved to Chicago.

=== 2010–present ===
Six years later, as an arranged surprise for Jack from his new wife, Emily Peterson (Stacy Haiduk), Kyle, along with Diane, made a brief return to Genoa City to visit with Jack while Jack and Kyle became acquainted. Diane returned to town with Kyle again eight months later. Kyle resided in Genoa City, while both of his parents were being investigated by the SEC for plotting against Victor and making money off his stocks after making the world believe that he died. His mother sent him to boarding school in Switzerland without informing Jack because she was planning on faking her own murder and then joining her son. She also pleaded with Victor to sign the custody papers for Kyle if anything were to ever happen to her. It was unknown whether Diane was just following Adam Newman's (Michael Muhney) orders in her faked murder plot, or if she really did want Victor to have custody of Kyle over Jack. Then, Jack found out that Diane sent Kyle away the night that she was actually murdered. After Diane's death, Jack tracked Kyle down under his alias, Timothy Bilton, and went to Switzerland to bring his son home. Jack then had to tell Kyle that his mother was killed.

While his father was under investigation, Kyle stole Jack's Harvard class ring that the police were looking for as evidence. He reasoned that he already had his mother taken away from him, and he wanted to keep his dad. Later, Victor showed Jack the custody papers that Diane made him sign, and Jack was infuriated at Victor and his deceased ex-wife for trying to take his son away from him. Jack vowed to fight to keep Kyle with his biological family. Kyle and Jack revealed to everyone that Kyle would be moving to New York to attend a hockey boarding school, and he left two weeks later. Kyle returns a grown adult for his new cousin's christening in April 2012. Upon seeing Nikki, the woman who killed Diane, and Jack together, he expresses his anger and distaste towards their relationship, claiming that they were bashing his mother's memory by being together. Afterward, Kyle went to Victor to ask if he could move in with him as Victor always said he was "welcome," and takes a job at Newman Enterprises. He then began dating Eden Baldwin (Jessica Heap), and made friends with many pillars of the town.

When Victor suddenly went missing and his wife Sharon Newman (Sharon Case) took over the ranch, Kyle eventually moved out after he could no longer deal with her. As a result of him insulting her, Sharon stole Kyle's driver's license as part of her kleptomania. Afterward, Jack told Kyle he was welcome to move back to the Abbott mansion, which he did. While working at Newman Enterprises, Kyle takes a liking to Phyllis and enlist her help in keeping an eye on Jack. When Kyle realizes that his father has been abusing his pain medications, he leaks the story to the press in an attempt to get Jack to realize he needs help. When Jack resigns as CEO of Newman Enterprises, he offers Kyle a job at Jabot Cosmetics, where he attracts the attention of young model Summer Newman (Hunter King). While initially dismissing her as too young, he later takes a liking to her and they begin a relationship. Summer's parents, Phyllis and Nicholas Newman (Joshua Morrow), secretly know that Summer is actually Jack's daughter, and Kyle is dating his half-sister. In an attempt to lure Kyle away from Summer, Phyllis kisses him and he ends their relationship. They briefly reunite before the truth about Summer's paternity is revealed, bringing their relationship to a permanent end. Kyle then continues working at Jabot alongside his father and later Hilary Curtis (Mishael Morgan) when Jack wants to find out what Victor is doing with Newman Enterprises' merger with Chancellor Industries. In order to do so, Jack enlists Kyle to ask Victor to rehire him at his company so he can get information on Bonaventure Industries, one of the company's subsidiaries. While working there, Kyle clashes with Noah Newman (Robert Adamson), who eventually reports him to Victor and he is fired. Soon after, it is said that Kyle was sent to work for Jabot in New York. In February 2015, Kyle (Lachlan Buchanan) returns to Genoa City, when he is rescued and believed to be missing resident Austin Travers (Matthew Atkinson).

In 2016, Kyle and Summer had a full-blown romance. Kyle and Summerknew they were each other's loves of their lives, each other's true loves, and each other's soulmates, but the timing was never right for them.

In 2020, Kyle and Summer got back together.

Kyle and Theo had a falling out with their friendship in New York. And Summer always had a wonderful and special relationship with Dina, Kyle's grandmother, that Kyle even gave part of Dina's emerald necklace to Summer as a special gift for Summer.

In February 2021, Kyle's secret is revealed after learning from his friend Sally Spectra (Courtney Hope) about Kyle and Summer's trip to Los Angeles to dig up dirt on Sally, his cousin Theo Vanderway (Tyler Johnson) decides to give Sally leverage to use against Kyle and Summer by revealing while Theo and Kyle were at the party in the Hamptons, Kyle meets and fell in love with the much older and beautiful Tara Locke (Elizabeth Leiner), the wife of a ruthless Business mogul Ashland Locke (Richard Burgi) nicknamed "The Locke Ness Monster", and the affair between Kyle and Tara produced a son named Harrison Locke. Ashland doesn't know about his wife's affair with Kyle or that Kyle is the father of Harrison. Later, while visiting Kyle at the Jabot boardroom, Theo tells him that while he was in New York, he ran into Tara and her three-year-old son Harrison, who Theo mentioned that he has Kyle's dimples. Then Theo tells Kyle what would "Daddy Locke Ness Monster" would do to him, even Summer. After Theo left, Kyle mentioned to Sally don't believe into what Theo is saying, Sally replied she hoped that whatever Theo say isn't true, but if it is, she hope she doesn't want blow up his life. Later at the Grand Phoenix, Kyle tells Summer that Theo and Sally knows about his affair with Tara, but not about the possibility of him being the father of Harrison. Now Kyle, Summer and Sally have the ammunition that can be used against each other, they have decided to cease fire for now. Kyle later decided to contact Tara about Theo's claims about Harrison, but Tara texted Kyle to tell him not to contact her. Then, Kyle later confides his fears to Mariah Copeland (Camryn Grimes) about his situation with Tara, the possibility of Harrison being his son and what would Ashland do to him, if he found out that Kyle had an affair with his wife and him not being the father of Harrison. In March 2021, Kyle was on his way board a plane to New York to confront Tara, when he was reunited with Tara at the Grand Phoenix, she pleaded with him to drop the search for the truth about Harrison. He tells her that he knows during the time they were together, she didn't sleep with Ashland and while looking at the photos of Harrison, he noticed the similarities, because Harrison looks just like him and one way or other, he is getting a DNA test. Then Tara admitted that she had a DNA test done on Harrison and Kyle is the father. Before she left, she tells him that Harrison is happy and not to come looking for them.

In 2021, Kyle and Harrison moved to Milan to be with Summer, and Kyle and Summer were married and raising Harrison, becoming wonderful parents and thriving in their careers while becoming a stronger couple together.

== Reception ==
In 2009, Jamey Giddens of Zap2it wrote that Zack Conroy would fit well as a teenaged version of the character, saying he "would kill to see Conroy create the role of a teenage Kyle Abbott on The Young and the Restless". He also criticized Kyle's absence over the years and predicted his return to the soap opera, writing: "Imagine Kyle Abbott arriving in Genoa City with a massive chip on his shoulder. Maybe he could seduce that annoying Eden away from Noah, or get involved in a steamy affair with a woman twice his age, like Lauren Fenmore (the woefully-underutilized Tracey Bregman)?" Jillian Bowe (also of Zap2it) criticized Ryan's introduction and the character's return in 2010, writing: "Sound the alarm and blow the trumpets. After years of begging and pleading with the regime over at The Young and the Restless to bring back Jack Abbott's (Peter Bergman) sons, one of them finally appears—sort of. Since Diane (now played by 30-something Maura West) returned, Y&R has all but beat fans over the head in reminding us of how Kyle was conceived, all the while neglecting to explain why Abby—who was conceived at the very same time as her cousin—is now decades older than him. What gives? De-SORASing the long-anticipated character of Kyle Abbott is a huge no-no and gigantic re-write of history. Good, bad or sticky, Y&R fans will always remember that two babies came from Kay Alden's wacky, sperm caper. My vote is Y&R needs to age Kyle appropriately before fans decide to flush this story (if not Jack and Victor's swimmers) down the drain." Tommy Garrett of the website Highlight Hollywood wrote that Hood's performance was "sensational" and found him "very handsome"; though was unfavorable of his successor, Sawyer, writing: "Hartley Sawyer, who with all due respect, is not attractive and actually very boring in the role." Soap Opera Digest described the decision to "dump the charming Blake Hood" and recast the character with Sawyer as "puzzling".

Charlie Mason from Soaps She Knows placed the 2015 recast of Kyle on his list of the worst soap opera recasts of all time, commenting that while Buchanan had a "promising career", he had been "a flop in the role" that Michael ", and also commented on how Sawyer's portrayal was also "short-lived". He also said that Mealor had made the role "very much his own".
