= Nicholas Newman =

- The Young and the Restless character
- Joshua Morrow as Nicholas Newman
- Portrayed by: Marco and Stefan Flores (1989); Griffin Ledner (1990–1991); John Alden (1991–1994); Joshua Morrow (1994–present); Thad Luckinbill (2018)
- Duration: 1988–present
- First appearance: December 31, 1988
- Created by: William J. Bell
- Introduced by: William J. Bell and Edward J. Scott (1988–1994); Mal Young (2018)
In-universe information
- Occupation: Businessman (1995–2012, 2015, 2018–present); Magazine owner; Coffeehouse owner
- Parents: Victor Newman; Nikki Newman
- Siblings: Dylan McAvoy; Victoria Newman; Adam Newman; John Abbot III; Abby Newman
- Spouse: Sharon Newman (1995–2007) (Note: The first marriage between Nick and Sharon took place from 1995 to 1996, and the couple re-married in 1996 until their divorce in 2007. However, they were married consecutively from 1995 to 2007.); Phyllis Summers (2007–2010, 2012–2013); Sage Warner (2015–2016)
- Children: Noah Newman; Summer Newman; Faith Newman; Christian Newman (legal)
- Adoptive children: Cassie Newman
- Grandchildren: Harrison Abbott (adoptive)
- Grandparents: Albert Miller; Cora Miller; Nicholas Reed; Barbara Reed
- Aunts and uncles: Matt Miller; Casey Reed
- Nieces and nephews: Claire Grace; Reed Hellstrom; Johnny Abbott (adoptive); Connor Newman; Katie Newman; Dominic Abbott Newman Winters Chancellor

Nicholas Newman is a fictional character from the American CBS soap opera The Young and the Restless. Created and introduced by William J. Bell, he was born onscreen in 1988 as the second child of supercouple characters Victor and Nikki Newman. Portrayed by a set of twins and later two child actors for his first six-year period, the writers of the series decided to rapidly age the character to a teenager in the summer of 1994. That June, Joshua Morrow began portraying Nick, and has remained in the role ever since. The character was reintroduced with the purpose of developing a relationship with another character, Sharon Collins, who was introduced around the same story arc. The pairing, which yielded three children, Cassie, Noah and Faith Newman, proved popular with viewers. They are regarded as a prominent supercouple by the soap opera media.

In 2005, the character underwent a dramatic change in storyline when Nick and Sharon's fourteen-year-old daughter Cassie was killed off after a car accident. This led Nick to seek comfort in the arms of another woman, Phyllis Summers, which resulted in an affair. Phyllis became pregnant with Nick's child, Summer Newman. Nick divorced Sharon and married Phyllis the following year. For years, however, Nick battled between his ongoing feelings with Sharon and Phyllis. His other storylines have included trying to seek independence away from his powerful father as well as multiple other relationships. In 2013, a storyline regarding Summer's paternity was visited, centered on speculation that she is actually the daughter of Jack Abbott, Phyllis' ex-husband.

Morrow regards Nick as a "good dude" who has a "fiery" protective personality, which has developed into a "more mature" persona as the character grew. Nick and Morrow gained a significant amount of crazed fan attention and popularity during the late 1990s, considered a long-time fan favorite by TV Guide. The pairing of Nick and Sharon has been met with notable success, listed as one of the genre's best supercouples by The Huffington Post and SoapNet, among other sources. Morrow's performance has been met with critical acclaim, having garnered him the Daytime Emmy Award for Outstanding Younger Actor in a Drama Series nomination consecutively from 1996 to 2000.

== Casting and creation ==
Created and introduced by William J. Bell, the role of Nicholas Newman was born onscreen during the episode dated December 31, 1988. The character was portrayed by infant twins Marco and Stefan Flores in 1989, while child actor Griffin Ledner took over the following year, departing in January 1991. Child actor John Alden played the role of Nick from 1991 to 1994. On June 21, 1994, the producers of the series decided to rapidly age Nick to a teenager; ending speculation that another teenage child of Victor Newman (Eric Braeden) would be introduced to the soap opera. The character's return as a teenager was written as him returning from boarding school after a long duration. Since then, the role has been portrayed by actor Joshua Morrow. Morrow had previously auditioned for the role of Dylan Shaw on another CBS soap opera The Bold and the Beautiful, making it to the final two casting options, but lost the role to Dylan Neal. The network later requested him to read for the part of Nick, which he won. Morrow, who worked in a restaurant prior to debuting on The Young and the Restless, considered his change in profession a "quantum leap in careers". He said that accepting the role was "a very easy decision" considering how popular the show was. The Record newspaper described the role as being "tailor-made" for Morrow.

In 2002, Morrow signed a new contract with the soap opera that would ensure his portrayal of the role for an additional five years. His contract was considered "record-breaking" at the time, as no soap opera contract had exceeded four years prior to this. Upon his contract's expiration in 2007, Morrow agreed to an additional five years with The Young and the Restless. He stated he was "happy to know" where he was going to be for the next five years, as well as expressing gratitude towards the soap opera for accommodating his living conditions and schedule. Morrow has portrayed the role ever since.

Thad Luckinbill stepped into the role on July 16, 2018, when it was revealed Nicholas had been posing as J. T. Hellstrom (Luckinbill).

== Development ==
=== Characterization ===
"Nick is ready to assume this role in life which can only be achieved by when your father is out of your way. So, I guess those would be three of the top reasons Nick would want to 'stick it' to Victor".

— Morrow, on Nick suing his father (2011)

Nick is described by the soap opera's official website as often thinking "with his heart instead of his head". When the teenaged version of Nick debuted on the series in 1994, he was characterized as a "frisky" 16-year-old "rich-kid", with Morrow being able to "kick back and relax in typical teenager attire—jeans, tees, etc". Morrow said "Nick's eager and fun-loving ... and that's fun to play". Nick also has an "eye for the ladies". In 1999, Morrow told soap magazine Soap Opera Digest that Nick has a "fiery personality", and "if you attack him, he's going to fight back". Morrow has insisted that he is not concerned about viewer backlash towards Nick, having stated: "My job is not to be palatable to the audience. I want to tell a convincing story. I have never been a man in love with two women. I can only imagine what that must be like." The actor felt that if he needed to "look like an ass and a bad guy" to keep people interested in his portrayal, "so be it". He told Tommy Garrett of Canyon News: "I’d rather be playing an imperfect good guy than a boring one. There is a lot of me in Nick, there is not that big of a stretch for me on a daily basis". A controversial storyline occurred in 2011 when alongside his sisters Abby Newman (Marcy Rylan) and Victoria Abbott (Amelia Heinle), Nick sued his father. Morrow felt that Nick wants to teach Victor a lesson, hoping he will "appreciate his children more". He also stated Nick wants to get respect, as he isn't "this young and impressionable boy who looks at his father in this hero light anymore." By the following year, Morrow opined that Nick is now "more mature" with his decision-making, and that "He's got a very practical view of the world, and I like that he's kind of become a steady character on the show". He stated that although the part isn't as "splashy or flashy" as Adam Newman (Michael Muhney), Nick's onscreen brother, he "really" likes Nick because "he's a good dude" and a "very supportive" person.

=== Nick and Sharon ===
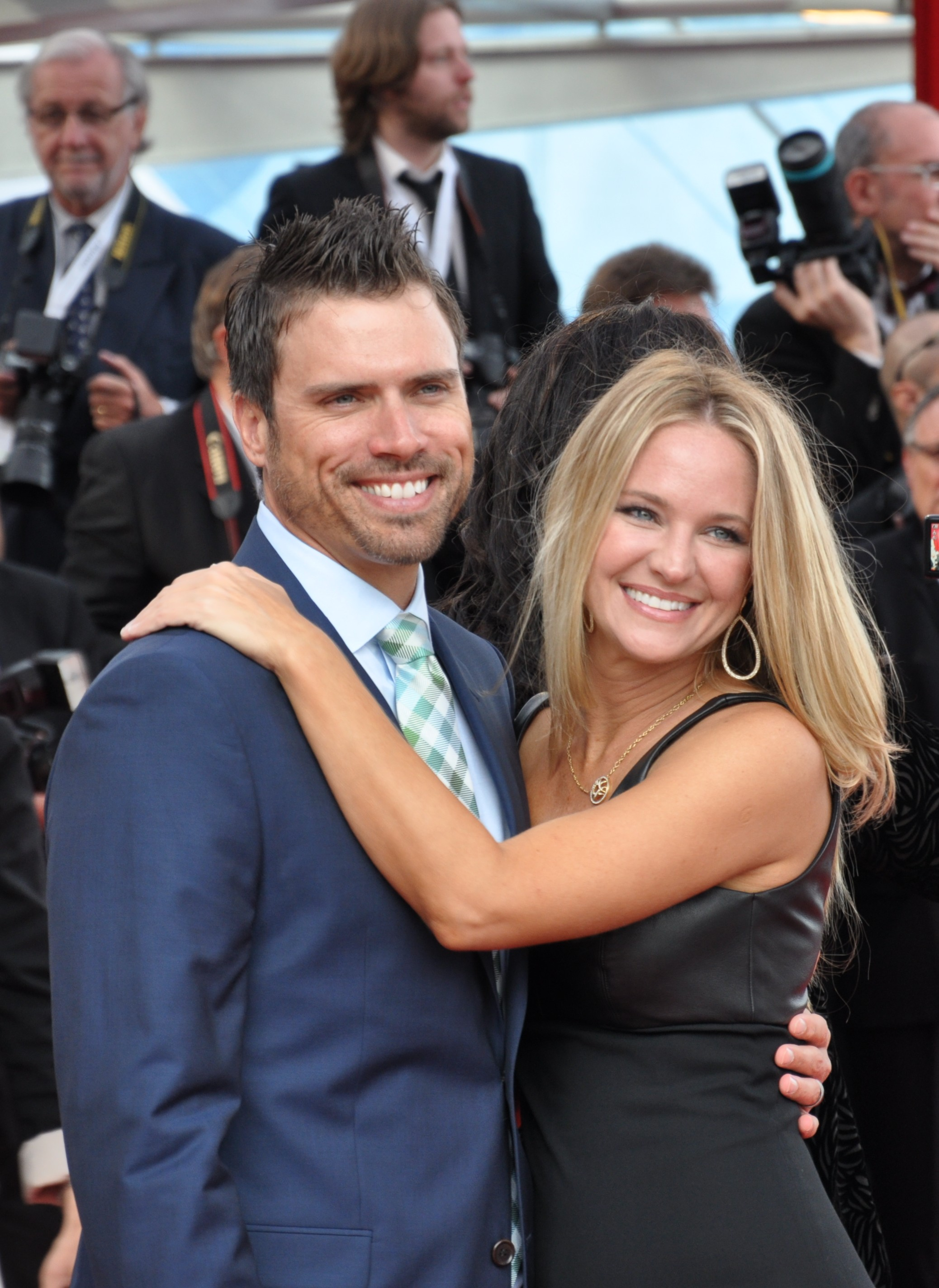
Joshua Morrow and Sharon Case portray Nick and Sharon

Since 1994, Nick, whose love life according to Morrow is "messy and convoluted", has been romantically linked to his high-school sweetheart Sharon Collins (Sharon Case). As teenagers, they dream of eloping, and face major hurdles when Sharon's ex-boyfriend Matt Clark (Eddie Cibrian) exposes Sharon's teenaged motherhood (when she gave her baby, fathered by her former boyfriend in Madison, up for adoption). Nick, believing Sharon is a virgin, briefly breaks up with her but they reunite. With Matt behind them, they marry in February 1996 and have their first child—Noah (Robert Adamson)—in 1997, the year Sharon is reunited with her daughter Cassie (Camryn Grimes). Sharon's best friend Grace Turner (Jennifer Gareis) seduces Nick, triggering another breakup; Sharon and Nick reunite during a custody battle for Cassie. Of their highly anticipated reunion, former head writer Kay Alden noted that during the previous several months "there's been a lot of stop-and-go" and "mixed messages" between the couple, but their feelings were "definitely clear" again; Morrow felt that Nick loved Cassie as much as he loves Noah. However, in 2002, Sharon has an affair with Diego Guittierez (Greg Vaughan), causing additional martial struggles for the pair. In May 2005, 14-year-old Cassie is killed in a car accident. Nick becomes distant from Sharon, and cheats on her with Phyllis Summers (Michelle Stafford). The marriage ends the following year; Nick marries a pregnant Phyllis, who gives birth to their daughter, Summer Newman (Hunter King).

Despite his marriage to Phyllis, Nick remains in love with Sharon, causing the love triangle between Nick, Sharon and Phyllis to reemerge in 2009. Nick became unable to forget Sharon, who began unraveling in her own life after a recent divorce. Morrow said Sharon "seems kind of vulnerable and susceptible to people saying things about her. So, Nick feels he has to protect her." However, this came at the expense of his marriage to Phyllis which began falling apart. In January 2009, Nick and Sharon reunite at the Abbott cabin, an affair "much anticipated" by viewers. According to Case, Sharon wanted Nick "more than anyone" but only if he left Phyllis; Morrow told TV Guide that although the reunion was "messy", fans "wanted this for a long time", sure that they would become a solid couple again. After another one-night stand Sharon becomes pregnant, briefly lying that Jack Abbott (Peter Bergman)—Sharon's ex-husband—is the baby's father when Summer becomes ill and Phyllis needs Nick. Nick soon finds out, but their daughter Faith is kidnapped at birth by Nick's brother, Adam Newman (Michael Muhney), and given to Ashley Abbott (Eileen Davidson). Sharon, believing Faith has died, seduces a guilty Adam. Faith is eventually reunited with her parents, and Adam's crimes are revealed. Nick and Sharon are briefly engaged in November 2010, but they break up when she sleeps with Adam and their relationship becomes bitter. Although Case and Morrow believe the couple won't "ever be over" and "belong together", they are not currently together and may not reunite "anytime soon".

=== Cassie's death and affair with Phyllis ===
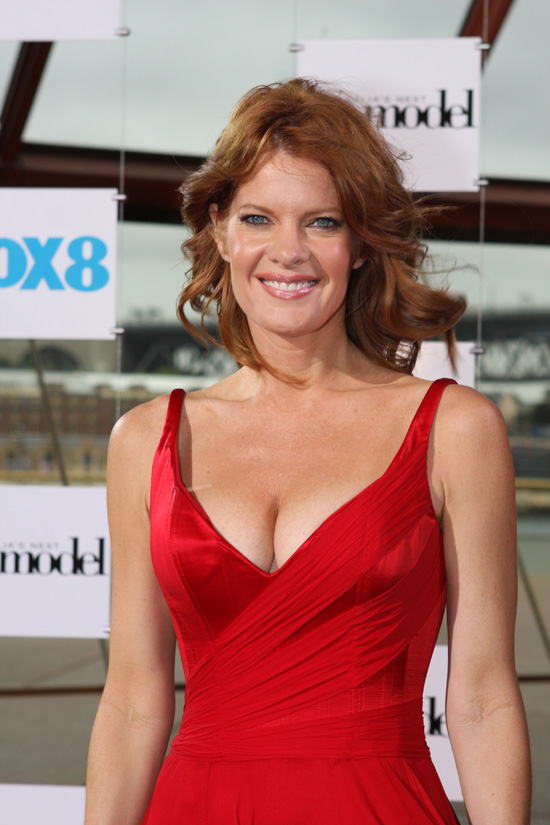
Michelle Stafford portrays Phyllis Summers, whom Nick has an affair with following the death of Cassie, which resulted in the birth of Summer Newman.

In 2005, former "good-girl" Cassie becomes a rebellious teenager; Nick and Sharon have a difficult time dealing with her. Cassie has a crush on bad-boy Daniel Romalotti (Michael Graziadei), who is dating Lily Winters (Christel Khalil). One night, against her parents' wishes she sneaks out to a party. In a ploy to impress a drunken Daniel she attempts to drive him home, despite being underage. The car crashes, leaving them with no memory of the accident. Daniel is thought to have been driving, and is blamed for the accident. A weakened Cassie escapes from the hospital to find Daniel and tell him she was driving; she is returned to the hospital. During the episode dated May 24, Cassie dies with Nick and Sharon at her side. Grimes said she did not think Cassie would die, but if it was "meant to happen, it's meant to happen". The actress found filming her last scenes with Case and Morrow "ridiculously hard". Daniel is cleared of all charges and Nick and Sharon begin Cassie's Foundation, a movement to prevent teenage drinking and driving. Following her death, the strong relationship between Nick and Sharon changes forever. Weighing in on the "groundbreaking" and "shocking" plot, Morrow stated, "As a person who watched Camryn grow up, I was devastated and it was not that difficult to use those feelings in the scenes we had to play. But as an actor, I have to commend our producer and writers at that time because it gave the show a huge new storyline that years later we are still playing out". He felt that losing a child gave Nick "an edge and a change" that affected him deeply. In 2012, during a court battle over Newman Enterprises (the family company), Nick tells a judge that Sharon's mental problems date to Cassie's death. Luke Kerr of Zap2it referred to this as playing the "Cassie card".

Nick uses an affair with workmate Phyllis Summers (Michelle Stafford) to numb his emotions after Cassie's tragic death. Phyllis and Nick go their separate ways as he reunites with Sharon, although he marries Phyllis when she becomes pregnant with his child. Their daughter, Summer Newman, is born in December 2006. Their three-year marriage eventually succumbs to Nick's ongoing feelings for Sharon, which resulted in an affair and the birth of their daughter, Faith. Nick divorces Phyllis in 2010. They briefly reunite and remarry in 2012, although it ends because of Phyllis' adultery and lies. Morrow stated that "not many husbands would put up with what he has" in his marriages to Phyllis.

=== Summer's paternity ===
For years, it has been speculated that Summer was fathered by Jack, not Nick. When asked about this in 2010, Morrow stated: "The way Nick and Summer bond...Well, it’ll be tough if he reveals he’s not her dad now. But I’m a betting man and I’ll bet anything that she’s Jack’s baby". In 2013, eighteen-year-old Summer (Hunter King) is intent on losing her virginity, and develops an interest for Jack Abbott's son Kyle Abbott (Blake Hood). Responding to this, head writer Josh Griffith stated that they were "looking at the possibility of anything". A poll run by Daytime Confidential revealed that most audiences believe Summer is the daughter of Jack, with 79% of votes.

In May 2013, Morrow spoke with Michael Logan of TV Guide, revealing that the question of Summer's paternity would be visited, as Nick's "game-changing deception" would be uncovered. It later revealed onscreen that Summer may in fact not be his daughter; the paternity results read only by Nick years ago were inconclusive. Logan called it "messy development", stating that his character may be "trashed forever". According to Morrow, after Cassie's death, Nick withheld the fact that the results were corrupted because "he just couldn't bear the thought of losing Summer, too", but called it "out of character". "But now he's freaking out because there's a good likelihood that Summer and Kyle are brother and sister," he stated. Nick later secretly does another test using hair from Summer's hairbrush, which comes back conclusive. Later that May, Morrow stated during an interview with TV Buzz that Nick would be devastated by the paternity test outcome; confirming that Summer is in fact Jack's daughter. He stated that Nick is "terrified" of the potential repercussions and the reactions, from Jack, Sharon, Noah, and most importantly Summer. However, months later it was revealed that the paternity test results were actually switched by Nick's ex-wife Sharon Newman (Sharon Case), while she was off her bipolar medication, in a ploy to win Nick back, meaning that he is in fact Summer's biological father after all. Sharon's secret has yet to be revealed. Speaking of the forthcoming reveal, King stated, "I'm very curious as to how they're going to play it out with Summer. I'm sure she's still going to have the close bond that she now has with Jack."

=== Addiction (2026) ===
In 2026, an addiction was introduced for the character of Nicholas. Following an overdose during the May 28 episode, Morrow spoke with TV Insider disclosing that the near-fatal event may not be the rock bottom moment for his character. "OD seems pretty rock bottom-y, but the fans will just have to stay tuned. There's still more runway here to go. This isn't going to be a quick fix for him," he told the website. Michael Maloney of TV Insider called Morrow's continued work during the storyline was a "reminder how addiction can happen to anyone and should never be judged".

== Storylines ==
Business tycoon Victor Newman (Eric Braeden) and his socialite wife Nikki Newman's (Melody Thomas Scott) marriage deteriorates and they decide to divorce. However, they end up conceiving a child. A son, Nicholas, is born on New Year's Eve of 1988. Nick grows up with two prominent men in his life, his father and stepfather Jack Abbott (Peter Bergman). Much like his older sister Victoria Newman (Amelia Heinle), Nick is sent to boarding school at a young age. In 1994, Nick returns to Genoa City, a typical sixteen-year-old teenager. He briefly dates Amy Wilson (Julianne Morris), but soon falls for her best friend, new resident Sharon Collins (Sharon Case). Nick and Sharon fall deeply in love, as she earns Victor's love and trust. However, Nikki is outraged, as she thinks Sharon, who is struggling financially, happens to be using Nick to get to the Newman fortune. Nonetheless, the relationship continues to blossom. Nick believes that Sharon is a virgin and agrees to wait for her, however, her ex-boyfriend Matt Clark shows up in town to expose Sharon's secret. It is revealed that Sharon gave birth to a daughter at age sixteen, which she gave up for adoption. Nick and Sharon briefly split because of this, but soon reunite. They continue to face problems, such as Sharon being raped by Matt. When Matt is nearly shot to death, Nick becomes the main suspect and is sent to jail. He eventually returns home and marries Sharon. She quickly becomes insecure in her marriage and stops using birth control, which results in a pregnancy. Months later, a premature son, Noah Newman, is welcomed. When it is feared that Noah would die at birth, Sharon's best friend, Grace Turner, tracks down her long-lost daughter, Cassie. However, when Noah lives, Grace attempts to keep Cassie as her own, but soon relinquishes her back to Sharon. Nick develops a bond with Cassie and becomes her father figure. Sharon and Nick's marriage weakens for months after he cheats on her with a manipulative Grace. However, they soon reunite during a custody battle over Cassie, where they are pronounced her official parents.

Matt returns to Genoa City with a reconstructed face, rapes Sharon once more, and is eventually captured. When Sharon ends up pregnant, it is unknown who the father is: Nick or Matt. An argument with Nick causes Sharon to give birth to a stillborn daughter, which is revealed to be Nick's following her death. Nick and Sharon's marriage weakens further when they both cheat on each other once more, Nick with Grace and Sharon with the Newman stableman Diego Guittierez (Greg Vaughan). Nick tries to forgive her, but when he witnesses Sharon and Victor kissing, things become harder to mend than ever. Sharon later runs away from town, depressed. When she returns, Nick accepts her and they reunite. However, a man named Cameron Kirsten (Linden Ashby) who physically abused her (after having an affair with her) followed Sharon to Genoa City, wanting to bed her again. Eventually, Cameron's schemes are foiled and Sharon and Nick return to their normal life at last. In 2005, a fourteen-year-old rebellious Cassie is killed in a car accident. Nick closes off his emotions and cheats on Sharon with his Newman Enterprises work friend Phyllis Summers. Phyllis ends up pregnant, with Jack or Nick as possible fathers. The original DNA test to determine the child's paternity returns inconclusive, but the thought of losing another child leads Nick into lying, and claiming that he is Summer's father. Nick and Sharon divorce after an eleven-year marriage and he marries Phyllis instead. Their daughter, Summer Newman, is born. Sharon also moves on with her life, marrying Jack, which makes Nick feel uncomfortable. In 2007, Nick's flight on the Newman jet crashes and a body is never recovered; he is presumed dead, devastating his family and Sharon.

Six months after being presumed dead, Nick is revealed to be alive, living with amnesia. Upon his return to Genoa City, he believes that Cassie is alive and that he is still married to Sharon and kisses her, intent on winning her back. However, soon his memory returns, and he reunites with Phyllis and Summer. Jack, Phyllis, Nick and Sharon soon start a business venture, creating a new magazine entitled Restless Style. However, the four constantly clash, and Jack and Sharon are driven out of the company. However, Nick and Sharon grow closer. While in Paris searching for a teenage Noah, Nick and Sharon share a kiss on the bridge, which is witnessed by Phyllis. Back in Genoa City, Nick and Sharon are snowed in at the Abbott cabin and end up making love. Their emotional affair continues, and they sleep together a second time three months later. This results in Sharon's pregnancy. She gives birth to Faith Newman in September 2009. She is stolen by Nick's brother Adam Newman at birth, presumed dead for months. Faith is eventually returned to her parents, after Sharon developed a relationship and married a manipulative Adam, unaware of his actions. Nick's marriage to Phyllis is over by this point.

Nick and Sharon grow closer co-parenting Faith and eventually reunite. However, it is short-lived when she sleeps with Adam, unable to shake her deep-rooted feelings for him. Nick, disgusted with her actions, takes full custody of Faith from her when Sharon is unjustly arrested for murder, but continues to support her. Sharon is sentenced to life in prison and skips town, leaving everyone to believe she is dead. Nick begins a relationship with Diane Jenkins (Maura West), who is also developing a courtship with his father, Victor, at the same time. Diane is killed by Nikki in self-defense. Sharon returns and is freed with the help of lawyer Avery Bailey Clark (Jessica Collins). Nick has a short affair with Avery, until he returns to Phyllis. Phyllis becomes pregnant once more, but soon miscarries the child. Nonetheless, Nick still marries her. However, the marriage is short-lived, ending just months later, with Nick moving on to a relationship with Avery. Nick begins a new phase in his life. He decides to end his career as a businessman at Newman Enterprises and open up a club, which he names The Underground. When Summer finds herself attracted to Jack's son Kyle Abbott (Blake Hood), Nick panics, knowing that Summer may become involved with her biological brother. He has another DNA test performed, which appears to confirm that Nick is not Summer's biological father. However, in reality, Sharon (who has stopped taking medication to treat her bipolar disorder), altered the results in an attempt to get Nick to return to her. Nick confesses to Summer that Jack is her father. Sharon's attempts fail, and Nick and Avery become engaged; Avery misses the wedding after tending to her mentally distraught ex-boyfriend Dylan McAvoy (Steve Burton), and the relationship ends. Nick grows closer with Sharon, who continues to withhold the truth. Sharon's memories of changing the DNA results are wiped out after she undergoes electroconvulsive therapy to get rid of her "visions" of Cassie's ghost, which in actuality is Mariah Copeland (Camryn Grimes), a Cassie lookalike hired by Victor to haunt Sharon.

== Reception ==
TV Guide noted Morrow to be one of the soap opera's longtime fan favorites. In his early years, The Chicago Tribune described the character as a "heartthrob". Also during his early tenure on the series, Liz Wilson of The Record wrote that Morrow is a "soap opera hunk", noting his large group of "mostly young female fans". In July 1995, more than 12,000 fans of the show attended a "Men of Y&R" event, which also featured fellow actors Eddie Cibrian, Shemar Moore and Don Diamont. The event organizer stated that it was a "mob scene", as over 6,000 fans turned up to meet each actor. According to The Augusta Chronicle, by 1999, "Wedding proposals, prom invitations and underwear-tossing fans are a part of everyday life for soap opera star Joshua Morrow", noting his fans to be "trembling" and "starry-eyed" in his presence. Nancy Dehart of The Spectator noted that his "mostly female" fans "even seemed to know more about his soap opera life than he did", quoting a fan exclaiming, "He's so sexy, I've got 100 pictures of him at home on my walls," at another event. Morrow revealed that his fans commonly refer to him as Nick, not Joshua, stating: "Fans see me every day as Nick Newman, so I don't fault them for calling me that [...] It's important that they do realize it's pretend, though".

Michael Fairman of On-Air On-Soaps describes the character of Nick to be "not-so-upstanding", however has lauded Morrow as "one of the most underrated actors in daytime, who delivers real and honest performances day after day, no matter what the material". Luke Kerr of Zap2it wrote that Nick is "smooth, suave and did we mention rich?", naming him the "Newman prince". Tommy Garrett of the website Highlight Hollywood has often lauded Morrow's acting. Garrett stated that he "makes perfect choice daily as an actor" and is "solid as a rock from outer space" who "continues to shine" on screen. In a separate article, Garrett referred to Nick as someone who is occasionally "out of control" and "fights for what he wants", stating that "Morrow is the man in control" of his storyline, naming him "even more talented than any of daytime TV’s actors".

The supercouple pairing of Nick and Sharon has been met with notable popularity among viewers as well as critics. SoapNet placed them on a list of "Best of 2000s Decade: Couples", stating: "...They've been apart since the death of their daughter, Cassie, but we all know that they belong together". On a list of "Greatest Soap Opera Supercouples" by Kim Potts of The Huffington Post, Nick and Sharon were placed 16th. They are referred to by fans as "Shick", a combination of Sharon and Nick's names. The couple's onscreen reunion in 2009 allowed the show's Nielsen Ratings to rise by an average of 447,000, capitalizing on their popularity. Nick's relationship with Phyllis has also gained a fan following, who refer to them as "Phick".

Morrow's performance earned him five Daytime Emmy Award nominations for Outstanding Younger Actor consecutively from 1996 to 2000. However, the actor has won two Soap Opera Digest Awards, one for "Outstanding Younger Newcomer" in 1996 and another for "Outstanding Hero" in 2001. Amid critical praise for Cassie's storyline in 2005, Dan J. Kroll of the website Soap Central noted that it had "widely been expected" that Morrow and Case would receive nominations for Outstanding Lead Actress and Actor at the 33rd Daytime Emmy Awards; however, they were not. Despite this, Grimes was nominated for the Outstanding Younger Actress award.

The paternity reveal in which Summer was (falsely) revealed to be Jack's daughter was met with a negative response. Sara Bibel of the website Xfinity praised the acting performances delivered, but panned the writing as it "fell flat". Bibel wrote: "When a secret like this is released into the soap wild, its consequences should ricochet through the town. But this time the impact is minimal". Jamey Giddens of Zap2it stated that it was "sad to see a storyline that started with such huge, game-changing potential devolve into a head-scratching stink bomb".

In 2022, Charlie Mason from Soaps She Knows placed Nicholas 16th on his list of the best 25 characters from The Young and the Restless, commenting "A dreamboat run ashore, Joshua Morrow's on-screen persona is the hero in every romance novel… crossed with the mistake that every woman has ever warned a gal pal against making. Of note, no one has ever listened to the warnings. Also of note, yeah, we get it. Even now, we fall for Nick over and over again."
