= Diane Jenkins =

Fictional character from The Young and the Restless

- The Young and the Restless character
- Susan Walters as Diane Jenkins
- Portrayed by: Alex Donnelley (1982–2001); Susan Walters (2001–2010, 2022–present); Maura West (2010–2011)
- Duration: 1982–1984; 1986; 1996–2004; 2010–2011; 2022–present
- First appearance: April 28, 1982
- Created by: William J. Bell
- Introduced by: H. Wesley Kenney (1982); David Shaughnessy (2001); Maria Arena Bell and Paul Rauch (2010); Anthony Morina and Josh Griffith (2022); Michele Val Jean and Tracey Thomson (2026) (Note: In addition to Michele Val Jean and Tracey Thomson, other executive producers for Beyond the Gates include Sheila Ducksworth, Lela Coffey, Anna Saalfeld, Julie Hanan Carruthers, Leon W. Russell, and Derrick Johnson.)
- Crossover appearances: Beyond the Gates (2026)
- Alex Donnelley as Diane Jenkins
In-universe information
- Other names: Diane Amelia Jenkins; Diane Richards; Diane Newman; Taylor Jensen; Diane Abbott
- Occupation: Architect; Businesswoman; Model
- Father: Kyle Jenkins
- Husband: Andy Richards (1984–1986); Victor Newman (1997–1999, 2011); Jack Abbott (2023–present)
- Sons: Kyle Abbott
- Grandsons: Harrison Locke

Diane Jenkins is a fictional character from the American CBS soap opera The Young and the Restless. The role was first portrayed by Alex Donnelley, who debuted on April 28, 1982. Diane was initially a two-day bit role, but was developed into a long-term character. Donnelley left the role two years later, returning briefly in 1986 before returning again fully in 1996. In 2001, Donnelley left again in what was supposed to be a storyline-dictated departure, however, the role was later recast with Susan Walters. After three years, Walters chose to drop to recurring status in 2004, but wasn't seen again until a brief guest appearance in February 2010. Seven months later, the role was recast a second time with Maura West, who took over in October; she exited in August of the following year. In March 2022, Walters returned to the role.

Diane has had relationships with business tycoons Jack Abbott (Peter Bergman) and Victor Newman (Eric Braeden). Diane has a son with Jack, Kyle Abbott (Michael Mealor), who was supposed to be Victor's son before his sperm sample was switched. Donnelley described Diane as "taking herself much too seriously", while Walters criticized the character for existing solely to advance another character's storyline. Former head writer Maria Arena Bell was heavily criticized for the writing for West; Zap2it said Bell missed an opportunity to focus on Diane's rivalry with Jack. In 2011, within eight months of joining the cast, West was let go and the character was killed off two months later in a whodunit murder storyline. The storyline also was harshly criticized for progressing too slowly, as it was a six-month period before the revelation that Nikki Newman (Melody Thomas Scott) thought that she had killed Diane in self-defense. However, further video evidence shows that it was Nikki's then husband, Deacon Sharpe (Sean Kanan) who delivered the final blow with a rock to Diane's head, resolving the death investigation of Diane and clearing Nikki. It was later revealed in 2022 that Deacon helped fake her death and left Kyle to be raised by Jack.

== Casting and creation ==
Maura West was cast as Diane in 2010 following the cancellation of As the World Turns; she exited the following year.

A guest appearance Donnelley made on Simon & Simon attracted the attention of the series' casting department, and she was eventually cast in the intended short-term role of Diane. The role was later expanded and Donnelley signed a three-year contract. In 1984, Donnelley left the role to pursue a career in primetime television and feature films, but returned for a brief guest appearance in 1986. In 1996, Donnelley returned to the role fully, remaining for an additional five years until it was announced that she would exit in a storyline dictated departure during the February sweeps period of 2001. After her onscreen departure, Donnelley was officially let go from the soap but was said to possibly return at a later date. Instead, the role was recast with Walters due to the writers wanting to take the character in a different direction. Donnelley commented that it was disappointing not to be returning to the role. In 2004, Walters opted not to renew her contract and was bumped to recurring status. She explained that she wasn't ruling out a possible return in the future. However, she wanted the character to have a storyline of her own rather than existing for the sole purpose of advancing another character's story. After nearly six years off-screen, Walters reprised the role in a two-episode guest appearance in February 2010.

In August, seven months later, it was announced that Maura West would take over the role. West said the character had potential and was interesting. In May 2011, eight months after joining the cast, West was let go from the role and exited onscreen in August as part of a whodunit murder storyline.

Walters returned to the role at the conclusion of the March 23, 2022, episode. On January 27, 2026, it was announced Walters would crossover to Beyond the Gates as Diane. This event aired from June 9 to June 12 of the same year.

== Storylines ==
=== 1982–1984, 1986 ===
Calculating that dating Jack Abbott would help her become a top model at Jabot, Diane Jenkins decided to start sleeping with him and fell in love with him, but Jack left her when he decided to marry Patty Williams as a way to show his father that he is a grown man. Despite that, Jack was late to his own wedding because he was sleeping with Diane. Diane and Jack continued their affair, and she was able to blackmail her way into becoming Jabot's top model. Jack, however, was more interested in having Julia Newman be Jabot's top model. When Diane learned this, she heightened her affair with Jack. Later, Patty miscarried upon seeing Jack and Diane making love in the Jabot headquarters lobby. Nonetheless, Patty wanted to continue her marriage to Jack just out of spite to Diane. After Patty's miscarriage, she wanted to have another baby and to move out of the Abbott Mansion and into their own house. Soon after, Jack spoke with former romance and current stepmother, Jill Abbott, about the real reason why he married Patty. Patty eventually found out and shot Jack. Jack lived, and Patty was sent to a mental facility. They later divorced.

Diane came to the conclusion that Jack isn't worth her time and focused on a new love, a detective named Andy Richards. Andy worked alongside Paul Williams, Patty's brother. The couple married and led an uneventful life, which led Diane to begin another affair with Jack. Later, Diane heard that Jack was going to give her a gift, which she had hoped was an engagement ring. Clearly, Jack had changed, so she asked Andy for a divorce and was looking forward to being with Jack, only to learn that the gift was a bracelet, which was his way of saying he would be unable to commit to her. Disappointed, Diane left to Europe, but even there she couldn't rest. She figured out that she loved Andy, so she returned to town only to find Andy happy with Farren Connor. She left town again.

=== 1996–2004 ===
Ten years later and now working as an architect, Diane returned to Genoa City a free woman. She began working for Jack again, leaving their families to worry that they might hook up again. Diane and Jack admitted their feelings for each other and got engaged. Jack's nemesis Victor Newman hatched a plan to steal Diane away from Jack as a way of getting revenge, but he fell for Diane. The couple got married and started living a good life until Diane decided to have a baby. She was bitterly disappointed to learn that Victor had a vasectomy suggested by his former wife, Nikki Newman. Nikki was shot by her husband's ex-wife, Veronica Landers, and was on her deathbed, so Victor divorced Diane in order to marry Nikki before she died. A twist of fate kept Nikki alive, while Diane was hoping that Victor would be able to remarry her. Victor and Nikki realized they still loved each other and decided to get married — because their quick marriage in the hospital wasn't legal. Diane didn't take this easily and decided to get revenge. At their divorce settlement in February 1999, Diane got a permanent board seat at Newman Enterprises.

Diane was taken by surprise when she learned Victor had his sperm frozen at Robertson Labs, so she arranged to get it in order to be artificially inseminated and carry Victor's child. Several people found out about it, and the sperm was stolen and transferred various times. When Diane finally got her hands on it again, she rushed to the doctor to be inseminated. Diane gave birth to a boy and named him Christian Victor Newman. She told Victor that the baby was his child. A DNA test proved that the baby wasn't Victor's, and Diane left town not long after. What Diane didn't know was that Nikki asked to switch Victor's sample with another, and she was shocked to learn that it was Jack's. Keen on finding out if Diane was a good mother, Nikki tracked her down in Milan and went to see her. She decided to keep quiet about the baby's paternity.

Diane returned to town not long after that trying to find out why Nikki went to see her. She renamed the baby Kyle and eventually found out that Jack was the father. Jack, who at the time was married to Phyllis Abbott, sued for sole custody of the child but didn't get it after Phyllis ruined her testimony on the stand. Diane got custody of the baby but refused to stop there — she wanted Jack back. She moved into the Abbott pool house and started playing games with Phyllis. Jack made an agreement to let Diane stay at the pool house but forbade her to go near the main house. One night, the pool house was burned down with Diane barely surviving. Phyllis was the main suspect for arson, but she was able to eventually prove that Diane set it up to look like Phyllis wanted her dead. Jack and Phyllis were able to get custody of Kyle. Diane's life got a bit better when Andy returned to Genoa City, and they started dating again, but he left not long after he arrived. Diane broke any attachment to Jabot, and Jack decided to give her Kyle back. She started working on a project for Newman with Drucilla Winters, but the project didn't last long. Diane then left to live in Chicago with her son.

=== 2010–2011 ===
In late February 2010, Diane returned to town to visit Jack with their son Kyle Jenkins Abbott as a surprise arranged by Jack's new wife Dr. Emily Peterson (Stacy Haiduk) as a wedding gift. In the process of her return, Diane had a run-in with her longtime nemesis Phyllis and unknown to Diane, as well as everyone, she also came face to face with Jack's first wife Patty Williams (Haiduk), who was posing as Emily, after causing her to be hospitalized and unconscious.

Diane returned to Genoa City in October 2010, admitted to Jack that she returned to town because of their son, Kyle (Garrett Ryan). Diane admitted that she hoped that Jack and Kyle could connect as father and son, revealing her intentions of moving back to town, leaving Toronto permanently. After sleeping with Tucker McCall (Stephen Nichols), McCall refuses to hire Diane due to an article published by Restless Style Magazine, owned by her rival Phyllis. Diane soon begins a romantic relationship with Nicholas Newman (Joshua Morrow), which is cut short due to Victor's jealousy. After being hired by Victor to do some work on The Newman Ranch, the pair in a mutually beneficial relationship.

The marriage fails to last when Victor rediscovers his love for Nikki, ending the marriage in an annulment. Consumed with robbing Victor of all he's worth, Diane schemes up a plan with Victor's son Adam Newman (Michael Muhney) to fake a pregnancy. However, when Victor discovers the scheme is a sham, he throws Diane out of the ambulance. Diane turns her attentions back to Jack for help, but after a night of passion, Jack refuses to let Diane back into his life in a romantic capacity. Determined to escape town, Diane purchases Kyle a fake passport to send him to Switzerland under the alias Timothy Bilton and with the help of Adam would escape town and join him there.

On the night she was expected to leave, Diane tried extorting Victor into giving her money for a tape that showed Abby Newman (Marcy Rylan) responsible for an accident which caused Tucker to land in the hospital for several months in a coma. When her attempt to extort Victor failed, she took her efforts to Ashley. Diane then confessed to having slept with Tucker, leading Ashley to slap her straight across the face. Diane then sends a mass text message to everyone who had wronged her: Abby, Ashley, Jack, Nicholas, Phyllis, Tucker and Victor. The morning after, Diane's dead body is discovered in the lake in the park by Patrick Murphy (Michael Fairman). Diane's death leads to a prolonged investigation.

In January 2012, more evidence is brought to the attention of Ronan Malloy (Jeff Branson), indicating Nikki Newman killed Diane Jenkins in self-defense. However, further video evidence shows that it was Nikki's then-husband Deacon Sharpe (Sean Kanan) who delivered the fatal blow from a rock to Diane's head, finally resolving the death investigation of Diane Jenkins.

=== 2022-present ===
In March 2022, it was revealed it was Diane who had been sending Jack mysterious text messages to inform him about the death of his son Keemo Volien Abbott (Philip Moon) and the existence of his long-lost granddaughter Allie Nguyen (Kelsey Wang). After Jack left Los Angeles, she sent him a text, informing him that he shouldn't have left LA and she would help him give Allie some time to get to know him. Later, she visited Allie at her father Keemo's house after purchasing it under her alias, Taylor Jensen. After meeting Jack and Allie at her new home, Diane reveals herself to Jack and reveals to Jack that she faked her death with the help of Deacon Sharpe. She later decides to return to Genoa City and stays at The Grand Phoenix hotel, run by Phyllis Summers (Michelle Stafford). As a result of Diane's decision, Nikki Newman, Phyllis Summers, and Jack's sister, Ashley Abbott, join forces to try and run her out of town, but their attempts fail. Diane eventually reconnects with her son, Kyle Abbott (Michael Mealor), and becomes romantically involved with his father, Jack Abbott (Peter Bergman) again. Jack and Diane get so serious that Jack proposes. Diane is hesitant at first, but later says yes to Jack. Jack and Diane then announce their engagement to everyone at the Genoa City bicentennial. The couple soon marries a few months later in a simple ceremony at the courthouse. Afterwards, the happy couple throws a celebration attended by family members and friends.

== Reception ==
Charlie Mason and Richard Simms from Soaps She Knows named the reveal of Diane still being alive as the "Biggest Shock" of 2022, saying they "never once suspected Diane would rise from her (premature) grave to stir things up again!" The following year, they wrote that Diane had the "Best Reinvention" in American soap operas of 2023, writing that there are "those who will never accept that Young & Restless' Diane has changed for the better. We are not among them. We love that she's done what so few characters are allowed to: She's learned from her mistakes and evolved." In 2024, Mason included Diane in a feature about the worst mothers in American soap operas, calling her a "scheme queen" who "probably did Kyle a favor by letting him grow up believing that she'd been murdered. But try telling that to her son, whose emotional wounds she selfishly reopened by upending his life with her "resurrection"". In December 2024, as part of their year-end listings, Walters received an honorable mention on Soap Opera Network's top female performers list.
