= Alex Donnelley =

German-born American actress

Alex Donnelly
- Born: Alexandra Donnelley; August 13, 1959 (age 67); Frankfurt, West Germany
- Occupation: Television actress
- Spouse: Robert Lamm (m. 1985; div. 1991)
- Children: 2

Alexandra Donnelley (born August 13, 1959) is a German-born American former actress.

== Career ==
Donnelley's best-known role is that of Diane Jenkins on the CBS soap opera The Young and the Restless from 1982 to 1984, and again in 1986. Donnelley went on to reprise her role again from October 1996 to February 2001. She also appeared in other television shows and films, such as Cruel Intentions 3.

== Personal life ==
Donnelley has two daughters from her marriage to musician Robert Lamm.

== Filmography ==
=== Film ===
Year	Title	Role	Notes
1979	Love and Bullets	Phoenix Diner Waitress	Uncredited
1994	My Girl 2	Acting Troupe	
1996	Bio-Dome	Woman in Crowd	Uncredited
2004	Cruel Intentions 3	Professor Eldridge	
2008	Drillbit Taylor	Filkins' Mom	
2009	Miss March	Mrs. Whitehall	

=== Television ===
Year	Title	Role	Notes
1982	Simon & Simon	Policewoman Barbara	Episode: "Matchmaker"
1982	Fantasy Island	Nurse	Episode: "The Angel's Triangle/Natchez Bound"
1982	Matt Houston	Secretary Alex	6 episodes
1983–2001	The Young and the Restless	Diane Jenkins	354 episodes
1985	The Other Lover	Lisa	Television film
1993	In Living Color	Party Guest	Episode: "Stacy Koon's Police Academy"
2007	Entourage	Wife	Episode: "The Day Fuckers"
2010	Wildlife	Cougar	Television film
2023	Bad Behaviour	Lucas	Episode: "The Worst"

First	Diane Jenkins (role); 1982–2001	Succeeded by Susan Walters
