= Phyllis Summers =

- The Young and the Restless character
- Michelle Stafford as Phyllis Summers
- Portrayed by: Michelle Stafford (1994–1997, 2000–2013, 2019–present); Sandra Nelson (1997–1999); Gina Tognoni (2014–2019)
- Duration: 1994–present
- First appearance: October 18, 1994
- Created by: William J. Bell
- Introduced by: William J. Bell and Edward J. Scott (1994, 2000); Jill Farren Phelps (2014); Anthony Morina and Josh Griffith (2019)
In-universe information
- Other names: Phyllis Romalotti; Phyllis Abbott; Phyllis Newman
- Occupation: Hotelier; Chief Executive Officer; Businesswoman; Editor-in-chief; Campaign manager; Webmaster; Computer operator
- Father: George Summers Jr
- Mother: Lydia Callahan
- Sisters: Avery Bailey Clark
- Husband: Danny Romalotti (1994–1996, 1997); Jack Abbott (2001–2004, 2015–2016); Nicholas Newman (2007–2010, 2012–2013); Jeremy Stark (2023)
- Sons: Daniel Romalotti
- Daughters: Summer Newman
- Grandsons: Harrison Abbott (adoptive)
- Granddaughters: Lucy Romalotti
- Grandfathers: George Summers Sr
- Grandmothers: Harriet Summers

Phyllis Summers is a fictional character from The Young and the Restless, an American soap opera on the CBS network. The character was created and introduced by William J. Bell, and debuted in the episode airing on October 18, 1994. Phyllis was originally and most notably portrayed by actress Michelle Stafford, until 1997, when Stafford was replaced by Sandra Nelson. Nelson continued in the role until 1999, when the character left; upon the character returning in 2000, head writer Kay Alden rehired Stafford. Stafford has been praised for her portrayal, for which she has won three Daytime Emmy Awards, but left the series after nearly sixteen years, with the character being written into a coma; Stafford last appeared on August 2, 2013. The role passed to Gina Tognoni, who debuted on August 11, 2014, and continued for nearly five years until she departed in June 2019, when Stafford re-claimed the role.

Phyllis was introduced as a groupie of fictional rock singer Danny Romalotti (Michael Damian), and claimed to have given birth to his child, Daniel (Michael Graziadei). Danny married Phyllis out of obligation to his son, sparking a rivalry between Phyllis and Danny's ex-wife, Christine Blair (Lauralee Bell), which is a continuing storyline. The character is known for scheming to get what she wants. Phyllis has also been involved with Jack Abbott (Peter Bergman), Nicholas Newman (Joshua Morrow) and Billy Abbott (Jason Thompson); all three relationships have fan followings.

== Casting ==
Stafford made her debut on October 18, 1994. Her stint on the soap opera was initially a short-term role; however, her work impressed the producers and she was placed on contract. On February 14, 1997, Stafford left the soap opera to pursue other career opportunities, and the role was recast with Sandra Nelson. She portrayed the role from March 21, 1997, until February 22, 1999. In July 2000, Stafford was brought back to the soap opera by former head writer Kay Alden. Stafford first aired on July 13 of that year. Speaking of her return, Stafford stated:

[The show] had approached me before, and then when this [opportunity] came up it wasn't through agents or anything like that. It was through Jerry Birn, one of the writers, who's still a really good friend of mine. He plays golf with my stepfather, so it came that way. We met for a drink, Jerry and I, and we just talked loosely because I wasn't sure that I wanted to come back on the show. [I saw] how excited he was about the character and what he wanted to do with the character was really cool. That's rare to find as an actress...that people are really excited and willing to work [and] write for you. Then I talked to Kay [Alden]. Everybody [that I spoke with] really had a strong opinion of the character and of where she would be in the show.

In 2009, Stafford signed a new contract with The Young and the Restless which would ensure her portrayal of Phyllis for an unspecified period of time. In May 2013, it was announced that Stafford would be exiting the soap opera after sixteen years in the role. Stafford later confirmed that her final scenes would air sometime that August.

In July 2013, Stafford appeared on the cover of Soap Opera Digest which was dubbed "Her Final Interview." In the interview with editor Stephanie Sloane, she confessed that she was completely done with the soap opera, though wouldn't mind if the role of Phyllis was recast, stating: "They may, as a courtesy, ask if I wanted to come back; I don't know, they may not. It's okay with me. It doesn't matter because I am done. I'm completely done. And I'm not upset if they recast, I totally would understand." Stafford also stated she had some ideas for a recast, but would not detail the specifics of those ideas.

Stafford also opened up as to her reasons for departing the series, stating, "There were other things that I really wanted to do. And the way that the show runs right now, the climate of daytime, the producers, the company, isn’t so apt to be as accommodating with other projects. I don’t say that as a criticism; as a producer, I’d do the same. And recently, probably at the end of last year, I was considering it seriously. I think it coincided with my sister getting sick in September, and being a mother, and really thinking about life, the future and other things that I wanted to create,” says Stafford on why she decided to leave the show. “There were a lot of personal reasons that I just think are not important to share with the world. Only my good friends should know." Stafford exited the series on August 2, 2013.

In May 2014, when Stafford joined the cast of General Hospital in the role of Nina Clay, the show went ahead with plans to recast the role of Phyllis. On May 22, 2014, reports surfaced that former One Life to Live and Guiding Light actress Gina Tognoni had been cast in the role of Phyllis, following her "flawless" audition. Tognoni began taping on July 9 and made her debut on August 11, 2014.

In March 2019, Daytime Confidential reported that Tognoni had been let go from the soap, with Stafford returning to the role. Tognoni made her last appearance on June 7, 2019; Stafford returned during the final moments of the June 17, 2019, episode.

== Development ==
=== Characterization ===
When she debuted, Phyllis was known to scheme to get what she wanted. The Record said she is "usually scheming and she wouldn't have her any other way." Of her "damaged" familial background, Stafford stated: "I think Phyllis is looking for something she decided must exist in life that maybe doesn’t. She is looking for something she never had, which is a family unit and real love. She is looking for that and she is thinking that it should be a certain way, because it is not what she had. In truth, that thing that she is looking for might not even exist. But she is trying to find it."

=== Relationships ===
Phyllis' first romance on the soap opera was with Danny Romalotti (Michael Damian), whom she conned into believing he had fathered a child with her. During their loveless marriage, Stafford stated: "Phyllis is trying to figure out how to hold on to (her husband) Danny. Her shrink tells her, 'Don't exaggerate your sexuality.' But she doesn't get it. Danny isn't even the father of the baby. That's something that might come up later. But in the meantime, this woman is going to get him." When he discovered her deception, a vicious divorce battle ensued. They later briefly remarried before Danny obtained custody of Phyllis' son, Daniel, and left town with him. Upon her return in 2000, Phyllis began dating Jack Abbott (Peter Bergman) and they were later married. Of their romance, Bergman stated: "These two were perfectly wrong for each other. These two people cared about each other and wanted this to work in the worst possible way, but just couldn’t make it work. That is not normal for soaps. It was fun to play and for the audience to watch, because these two people were desperately loving each other and they are destructive of each other, and someone is going to hurt someone here. These are two type “A” personalities." After being told more children weren't possible, Phyllis and Jack attempted to gain custody of Jack's son, Kyle Jenkins, from Diane Jenkins (Susan Walters), which failed and they eventually divorce in 2004.

In 2005, Phyllis and Jack reunited, just before she began an affair with Nicholas Newman (Joshua Morrow). Nick used the affair to numb his emotions after his daughter's tragic death, having been married to Sharon Newman (Sharon Case). A love triangle forms between the three characters, and while Nick initially returns to Sharon, Phyllis becomes pregnant and is unsure if Nick or Jack is the father. A paternity test supposedly revealed Nick as the father, and their daughter, Summer Newman (Hunter King), is born in December 2006, and they are married in May 2007. Their three-year marriage eventually succumbs to Nick's ongoing feelings for Sharon, which resulted in an affair and the birth of their daughter, Faith. Nick divorces Phyllis in 2010. They briefly reunite and remarry in 2012, although it ends due to Phyllis' adultery and lies. Morrow stated that "not many husbands would put up with what he has" in his marriages to Phyllis. For the years following Summer's birth, speculation arose that Jack was in fact Summer's father, not Nick. In 2013, it was revealed that the paternity test conducted in 2006 was inconclusive.

== Storylines ==
=== Backstory ===
Phyllis was born on June 14, 1974 in Darien, Connecticut, to parents George Summers and Lydia Callahan. She then ran away from home as a teenager for undisclosed reasons, leaving behind a younger sister who was revealed to be Avery Bailey Clark in 2011. In 1994, Phyllis gave birth to a son, Daniel, who was fathered by Brian Hamilton who wanted nothing to do with Phyllis or her unborn child. Thus, she conned Danny Romalotti into believing Daniel was his son, and he married her out of obligation. In 1995, her parents came to Genoa City to visit her but Phyllis chased them out of town.

=== 1994–present ===
Phyllis arrived in Genoa City in 1994. She was a fan of rockstar Danny Romalotti, whom she drugged to get in bed with her. When she got pregnant, Phyllis altered the DNA results to show Danny as the father. Danny left his wife, Christine Blair, and married Phyllis, who gave birth to Daniel Romalotti Jr. Danny eventually left Phyllis. Intent on revenge, Phyllis ran down Christine and her fiancé, Paul Williams. They survived.

Danny and Phyllis underwent therapy. Phyllis had an affair with her psychiatrist, Tim Reid; and taped them having sex to blackmail him into telling the courts that Danny and Phyllis should not divorce. They divorced anyway and Phyllis was briefly engaged to Tim before reuniting with Danny. Eventually, Brian Hamilton was revealed to be Daniel's biological father; however, Danny fought for custody and won, leaving town with him. During this time, Sasha Greene was blackmailing Phyllis before the custody case for Daniel, threatening to expose her of running down Christine with a car. The day before the trial, She confronted Sasha for the last time about possibly tricking her when Sasha died unexpectedly in her hotel room. Sasha was seen clutching a tabloid headline before her death, indicating that she may have sold her story to a tabloid. Phyllis feared that she might have killed Sasha, but the judge proclaimed that Sasha's death was accidental, as Sasha was a known careless smoker and heavy drinker.

Phyllis later had relationships with Malcolm Winters, Michael Baldwin, and Jack Abbott, before leaving town. She returned as a web designer for Jabot Cosmetics, but was later fired and went to work for Newman Enterprises.

Phyllis married Jack and they learned she was unable to have any more children. She and Jack tried to get custody of his son, Kyle Jenkins Abbott from Kyle's mother, Diane Jenkins, and Phyllis tried to get Diane out of their lives. Diane set Phyllis up to be jailed for arson and attempted murder, but Phyllis was released. She and Jack divorced. In 2004, Phyllis' son Daniel returned as a teenager and she eventually bonded with him as mother and son. Phyllis later reunited with Jack and began working with Nikki Newman on NVP, a new company funded by Newman Enterprises.

She then had an affair with Nick Newman while he was married to Sharon, and grieving the loss of their daughter Cassie. Phyllis became pregnant, and Nick divorced Sharon and then married Phyllis, who gave birth to Summer Newman. Phyllis blackmailed Brad Carlton over his own affair with Sharon, so he would vote for what she wanted on the Newman board.

While on a business trip with Sharon and Drucilla Winters, the three women got into a fight, and Drucilla and Sharon fell off a cliff; Dru was never found. Phyllis went to jail for blackmailing Brad and Sharon. Nick was later involved in a plane crash and presumed dead. He showed up months later, with amnesia, believing he was still married to Sharon. He eventually regained his memory. Later, Phyllis, Nick, Jack, and Sharon develop a "Restless Style" magazine, but Jack and Sharon eventually leave. After witnessing Nick and Sharon kissing in Paris, Phyllis tried to get Brad to keep Sharon away from Nick. This failed, and Nick and Sharon had sex at the Abbott cabin. Sharon wound up pregnant, giving birth to Faith Newman. Phyllis divorces Nick due to his connection with Sharon.

Nick and Phyllis eventually reconnected, despite their divorce. Phyllis got custody of Daniel's daughter Lucy, who had been illegally adopted by Billy and Victoria Abbott. In 2012, Phyllis became pregnant and Nick proposed. Phyllis lost the baby, but they still got married. Their marriage was strained when Phyllis finally faced charges for running down Paul and Christine in December 1994. Phyllis' former therapist, Tim Reid, came to town and blackmailed Phyllis. When Tim dropped dead in Phyllis' apartment, she moved the body and then turned to Ronan Malloy for help. Her marriage to Nick ended when Phyllis slept with Ronan, also straining Phyllis' relationship with a teenaged Summer. Phyllis eventually regained a close relationship with her daughter, while also rekindling her romance with Jack.

In the summer of 2013, it was revealed that Nick had lied and claimed paternity over Summer, despite the original paternity test taken years before having been corrupted. He takes a second test, which still proves that he is the father. However, Sharon now wants Nick back, and tampers with the test results, allowing everyone to believe Jack is now the father of Summer. Phyllis ultimately hears Sharon confessing to this at Cassie's grave, resulting in an altercation between the two and ending with Phyllis falling down a flight of stairs. At the hospital, Phyllis briefly awakes with Jack at her side, and he proposes, but Phyllis is unresponsive. She then has a panic attack at the sight of Sharon in the window of the door. This causes her to relapse into a coma and is diagnosed with a bruise on her brain. This causes Daniel to request that she be moved to an experimental facility off the coast of where he resides, in Georgia. This is much to the dismay of Jack, Summer, and Avery, as they do not want her to be so far away. After much convincing, the group decides to try everything possible to help Phyllis, and agrees to send her to Georgia. Before leaving for Georgia, Jack is seen placing a ring on an unresponsive, comatose Phyllis to make their engagement official.

In the summer of 2014, Summer makes a visit to inform her mother that she has married Austin Travers (Matthew Atkinson). While she lay in her coma, Jack comes to visit Phyllis to tell her that he needed to see her one last time before he officially moves on with the new woman in his life, Kelly Andrews (Cady McClain). He also speaks with her doctor, who informs him that there has been very little change in Phyllis' condition over the past year, and there is very little that they can do. In an attempt to uncover Sharon's paternity test-switch secret, Victor goes to Georgia and gathers information about a risky form of medication that may be able to wake up patients who are in comas. The doctor later tells him that in order for the medication to be used, he would need the approval and signature of an immediate family member. Triggered by Victor's visit, Phyllis begins to display small responses of movement. After Victor secretly gets Summer to forge her signature on the required documents, Phyllis' doctor begins to administer the drug, and she emerges from her coma. Escaping the clinic, she hitchhikes her way back to Genoa City and crashes the wedding of Nick and Sharon.

Phyllis' friends and family are thrilled that Phyllis is back. Kelly, however, is not due to the fact that Phyllis' return to Genoa City caused the termination of Kelly and Jack's relationship. In November, when Sharon is getting ready for her second attempt to marry Nick, Phyllis shows up and tricks Sharon into going with her to the stairwell where Phyllis fell.

In September 2016, Phyllis and Jack divorced due to Phyllis and Billy's affair. Phyllis desperately tries to regain Jacks love and trust, but fails to do so and gives up in December 2016 after sharing a kiss. They now have a civil work relationship and continue to involve themselves in each other's lives.

In August 2017, Phyllis and Benjamin Hochman create a plan to take down Victoria Newman's company, Brash and Sassy so Phyllis can spend more time with Billy.

In April 2018, Phyllis helps bury the body of J.T Hellstorm, with the help of Sharon Newman, Victoria Newman, and Nikki Newman after Nikki hits J.T over the head with a fire poker.

In July 2018, Phyllis sleeps with Nicholas despite being in a relationship with Billy Abbott. In September, Mariah Copeland learns of Nick and Phyllis’s betrayal, and tells her mother, Sharon Newman, on the day she is supposed to marry Nick. Sharon confronts Nick, in front of their family and friends, and leaves him at the altar. Once Billy learns of this, he sleeps with Summer in retaliation, leading to the end of Billy and Phyllis’s relationship.

Phyllis becomes Jabots CEO in late October 2018, and enlists the help of newcomer Kerry Johnson to replace the position of the absent Ashley Abbott.

Hot off the heels of her breakup, Phyllis finds comfort in Nick, and they decide to start a relationship, as well as move in together, much to the dismay of Sharon. However, this relationship is short lived, as Phyllis persuades the D.A, Christine Blair to give her immunity, in return to confessing about the murder of J.T. Hellstrom, and leaving the others to fend for themselves. Nick, being irritated and angry, leaves Phyllis soon after. After breaking up, Nick and Phyllis eventually find their way back to each other but their relationship fails to last and they end up going their separate ways again. Phyllis later rekindles her romance with Jack, but the relationship is short lived when Phyllis becomes more focused on throwing it in Diane Jenkins’ (Susan Walters) face.

After learning that Diane Jenkins was actually alive and had faked her death for years, Phyllis teams up with Ashley Abbott and Nikki Newman to try and run Diane out of town. In April 2023, she was reportedly killed in a fiery ambulance crash, despite faking her death with the help of conman Jeremy Stark (James Hyde), who claimed to be Phyllis’ husband. At first, it seems as if Phyllis and Stark have the perfect plan up their sleeves, but Stark’s demands and threats become extremely overwhelming and pressuring for Phyllis to put up with that she ends up killing him by stabbing him with a pair of scissors. Afterwards, Phyllis reveals herself, alive and well, to her daughter, Summer Newman (Allison Lanier), and begs her not to tell anyone about her being alive, to which Summer agrees to. However, Summer doesn’t seem to live up to her promise and she soon informs her brother, Daniel Romalotti, who is adamant on letting everyone know about his mother.

== Reception ==
Stafford has been praised for her portrayal. In 1995, Lilana Novakovich of the Toronto Star stated: "Michelle Stafford is every bit as irrepressible as Phyllis Romalotti, her character on The Young and the Restless." The Sharon/Nick/Phyllis love triangle, which initially took place from 2006 to 2010, was considered one of the genre's most titillating storylines. Jamaica Gleaner was enthralled by the twists and turns of the love triangle and published an interview with Stafford; the newspaper asked whether Nick would end his ten-year marriage to Sharon and rather enter into an official romance with her pregnant character Phyllis. Stafford replied, "In a perfect world, she'd wish [the baby was] Nick's. But he's married; he's not going to leave Sharon. And she doesn't want him to." The love triangle was a prominent topic of soap opera debate during its run. Daniel R. Coleridge of TV Guide labeled it "A can't-miss week for the popular Sharon/Nick/Phyllis triangle" when Phyllis's OB-GYN is to inform her that she is expecting. On-Air On-Soaps has noted that both Phyllis' pairings with both Jack and Nick have garnered fan followings; they recognized her pairing with Nick as the "Phick vs. Shick" fan-base war.

Stafford has received a number of honors for her portrayal of Phyllis, including Soap Opera Digest Award wins for Outstanding Female Newcomer in 1996, for Outstanding Villainess in 1997 and for Outstanding Lead Actress in 2003, earning another nomination in the same category in 2005. Stafford also received a nomination for the Soap Opera Digest Award for Outstanding Female Scene Stealer in 2001. She received a Daytime Emmy Award nomination for Outstanding Supporting Actress in a Drama Series in 1996, winning in 1997. Stafford has also received eight nominations for the Daytime Emmy Award for Outstanding Lead Actress in a Drama Series in 2003, 2005, 2007, 2008, 2010, 2011, 2013, winning only once in 2004. At the 32nd Daytime Emmy Awards, Stafford and co-star Peter Bergman were nominated for the Special Fan Award for Irresistible Combination.

Tognoni's performance of Phyllis has been met with critical acclaim, earning a Daytime Emmy nomination for Outstanding Lead Actress in a Drama Series in 2015, yet winning the award in 2017.

In 2022, Charlie Mason from Soaps She Knows placed Phyllis 9th on his list of the best 25 characters from The Young and the Restless, commenting "A hurricane in high heels, this pot-stirrer makes every scene more exciting simply by walking into it. Yes, there’s a price to pay — oy, the miles of carnage in her wake! But to paraphrase Jessica Rabbit, the infamous strumpet brought to life by Michelle Stafford isn't bad, she's just drawn that way. And whatever way she goes, so do we — helplessly!"

In 2024, Mason cited Phyllis as one of the worst mothers in American soap operas and criticised her for faking her death after she had judged Diane for doing the same thing. For her performance as Phyllis, Stafford was named by TV Insider as their eighteenth best performance, in ranking their "21 Best Soap Performances of 2024". In the article, editor Michael Maloney wrote: "She refuses to be shut down or be called a hypocrite by anyone, which makes her an unstoppable force of nature!"
