= Blake Hood =

American actor (born 1985)

- Born: May 25, 1985 (age 39)
- Occupation: Actor
- Years active: 2007–2018

Blake Hood is an American former actor. His best known roles include Mark Driscoll on The CW's 90210 and Kyle Abbott on the CBS Daytime soap opera The Young and the Restless.

== Filmography ==
Film
Year	Title	Role	Notes
2008	The Shift	Dutch	Short film
2008	Playing with Fire	Omar	
2009	Safe Harbor	Randy	Television film
2010	Easy A	Kennedy Peters-Booth	
2010	Death and Cremation	David	
2015	For the Defense	Brad Fairbanks	Television film
2017	A Moving Romance	Robert	Television film

Television
Year	Title	Role	Notes
2007	'Til Death	Brian	Episode: "The Colleague"
2007	Studio 60 on the Sunset Strip	Actor playing Scott	Episode: "4 A.M. Miracle"
2007	Desperate Housewives	Boomer	Episode: "Smiles of a Summer Night"
2008	Do Not Disturb	Austin	Episode: "Dosing"
2009	Ghost Whisperer	Boyfriend	Episode: "Body of Water"
2009–10	90210	Mark Driscoll	8 episodes
2010	Cold Case	Cole Austen (1989)	Episode: "Almost Paradise"
2012	2 Broke Girls	Dr. David Shecter	Episode: "And the Broken Hearts"
2012–13	The Young and the Restless	Kyle Abbott	April 27, 2012 – April 12, 2013
2012	The Vampire Diaries	Dean	Episode: "The Killer"
2013	Revolution	Jeff	Episode: "Born in the U.S.A."
2014	Selfie	Miller	Episode: "Pilot"
2014	NCIS	Bennett Jermaine	Episode: "Semper Fortis" (Season 12, Episode 8)
2016	Forever 31	Nick	Mini-series; Main cast, episode 2-7
2018	Grey's Anatomy	Clive Johnson	Season 14; Recurring Character
