= Michael Mealor =

American actor and model (born 1992)

- Born: February 29, 1992 (age 34); Atlanta, Georgia, U.S.
- Occupations: Actor model
- Years active: 2014–present
- Known for: The Young and the Restless

Michael Mealor (born February 29, 1992) is an American actor and model. He is known for his role as Kyle Abbott on the CBS daytime soap opera The Young and the Restless (2018–present). He previously worked as a model for Abercrombie and Fitch. Originally from Atlanta, Georgia, he moved to Los Angeles to pursue a career in acting. He joined the main cast of The Young and the Restless in 2018 and departed in 2021. In 2022, it was announced that Mealor would return to reprise his role as Kyle on a long-term contract.

== Career ==
=== The Young and the Restless ===
Mealor joined the CBS daytime soap opera The Young and the Restless in 2018 for the role of Kyle Abbott, the prodigal son of Jack Abbott (Peter Bergman) in celebration of the soap's 45th anniversary. He joined his co-star Hunter King who played Summer Newman as her character's love interest. In 2021, Mealor confirmed his exit from Y&R and only made brief appearances on the show. In 2022, it was announced that Mealor would return to reprise his role as Kyle following the return of Y&R veteran Susan Walters who plays Kyle's mom, Diane Jenkins.

== Filmography ==
=== Television ===
Year	Title	Role	Notes
2014	Chasing Life	Frat Guy	Season 1 Episode 13: Guess Who's Coming to Donate
2015	Here Now	Bart	Short film
2015	Supergirl	Fratty dude	Season 1 Episode 4: Livewire
2016	Fall into me	Tom Shield	Season 1 Episode 1: Pilot; Season 1 Episode 2: Measurements
2016	Roadies	Josh the Runner	Season 1 Episode 5: Friends and Family
2018–present	The Young and the Restless	Kyle Abbott	Main Role: March 29, 2018 – August 6, 2021; October 12–15, 2021; March 15, 2022; April 25, 2022 – present
2021	It's Always Sunny in Philadelphia	Tony	Season 15 Episode 4: The Gang Replaces Dee With a Monkey

=== Films ===
Year	Title	Role	Notes
2014	Indigenous	Michael	
