= Jack Landrón =

American Afro-Caribbean actor and folksinger

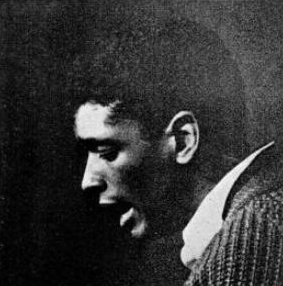
- Landrón in 1962

Background information
- Also known as: Jackie Washington
- Born: Juán Cándido Washington y Landrón; June 2, 1938 (age 88); Puerto Rico
- Origin: Puerto Rico
- Occupations: Folksinger, Songwriter, Actor

Jack Landrón (born Juán Cándido Washington y Landrón, June 2, 1938) is an Afro-Puerto Rican folksinger, songwriter, and actor.

== Jackie Washington ==
Born Juán Cándido Washington y Landrón on June 2, 1938, in Puerto Rico, he grew up in the Boston, Massachusetts, neighborhood of Roxbury. He studied at Emerson College as a theater arts major. As part of the Cambridge/Boston folk music scene in the early and mid-1960s, he released four albums on Vanguard, appearing in person and recording under the name Jackie Washington. Vanguard tried to groom Washington as a male counterpart to Joan Baez. The albums are titled Jackie Washington (1962), Jackie Washington/2 (1963), Jackie Washington at Club 47 (1965), and Morning Song (1967). The last of these LPs consisted entirely of original compositions and was his first with a band.

None of Washington's folk albums was re-released on CD, but individual songs have appeared on anthologies. His sole single, for instance, "Why Won't They Let Me Be?" (1966), is included in Northern Soul's Classiest Rarities 2 (Kent, 2005).] The live album, Jackie Washington at Club 47, featuring a cover collage by Eric Von Schmidt, gives a feel for his live act, including the patter between numbers. Washington not only relates the context of the songs but also relates personal anecdotes in a style reminiscent of the early stand-up comedy of Bill Cosby. "Esta Navidad" from his first album is included in the 1995 Vanguard compilation A Folksinger's Christmas.

While coming home in the early hours of December 3, 1962, Washington was arrested by the Boston Police: what happened was the subject of dispute, with the police saying that when they questioned him, Washington assaulted one of the officers and Washington asserting that he was stopped, and subsequently beaten by two officers, for no reason other than his race. The case resulted in a cause célèbre which Washington's supporters believed had exposed racism in the Boston police force. Washington was ultimately acquitted of all charges, in a verdict that took the jury only five hours to reach.

In the summer of 1964 Washington y Landrón participated in Freedom Schools conducted in the South as part of the civil rights movement. Three of the performances from his live album are included in the double-CD anthology Freedom Is A Constant Struggle (Songs of the Mississippi Civil Rights Movement) (1994). At one point he was Dr. Martin Luther King's personal assistant in Mississippi. In 1964, Washington also teamed for a time with Tony Saletan and Irene Kossoy (formerly and subsequently of the Kossoy Sisters) to form the Boston Folk Trio, which presented school concerts through the non-profit Young Audiences Arts for Learning.

Washington's version of the traditional English nonsense song "Nottamun Town" was the tune and arrangement used by Bob Dylan as the basis for "Masters of War", . (Clinton Heylin in Revolution In the Air (2009) rejects this idea as "patently absurd" (p. 116), but Jackie Washington, including "Nottamun Town", was released in December 1962, and The Freewheelin' Bob Dylan, with "Masters of War", was released 27 May 1963; Dylan loved Washington's rendition, repeatedly requested he perform it, and asked Vanguard Records to give him a copy of Washington's debut album; Jean Ritchie, whose version Heylin and others give as Dylan's source, sings the song in a minor key but plays the accompaniment in major chords. Washington reset the melody to minor chords, and in the process changed it somewhat—Dylan liked this version and used it as the model for "Masters of War.") Washington's role in the song's transmission is acknowledged in Bob Dylan by Greil Marcus: Writings 1968–2010 (Public Affairs, 2010, p. 410).

Washington taught Joan Baez "There But For Fortune" by Phil Ochs, which provided Baez with her first appearance on the singles chart. (Evidence that Baez learned the song from him lies in a lyric change; where Ochs had written "whose face is growing pale", Washington, being black, had substituted "whose life has grown stale"—which is how Baez sings it.)

On 25 July 1968 Washington was master of ceremonies for a political rally supporting anti-Vietnam War presidential candidate Eugene McCarthy held at the Red Sox' Fenway Park.

As the first performer to headline the Caffè Lena in Saratoga Springs, New York, in 1960, Washington was invited back in January 2010 to perform as part of an ongoing celebration of the club's 50th anniversary, with Bill Staines as the opening act. On 1 Feb 2013 he returned to Club Passim (formerly Club 47) in Cambridge, Mass.

Washington y Landrón's first album in 45 years, Curbside Cotillion, was released in 2012, his first recording as Jack Landrón. He is featured in the documentary For the Love of the Music: the Club 47 Folk Revival (2013). On 19 Dec 2014 Landrón spoke at the Cambridge Forum in Harvard Square, Massachusetts, about his experiences during Freedom Summer's voter registration drive in Mississippi in 1964. This appearance can be viewed on YouTube.

Originally managed by Manny Greenhill, Joan Baez's manager, Washington was later managed by Mitch Greenhill (Manny's son) through Folklore Productions. He later did his own bookings. Apart from his acting career, Washington in later years presented himself more as a storyteller than as a singer.

== Actor ==
Washington y Landrón relocated to Manhattan to pursue acting under the name of Jack Landrón. One of his earliest performances was in the 1966 National Educational Television production of Tennessee Williams' one-act play Ten Blocks on the Camino Real (1948), starring Lotte Lenya and Martin Sheen; this has been available on DVD. He has done extensive work in commercials and continues to compose. In 1975, as Jack Landrón, he performed in the Broadway musical Doctor Jazz.

Landrón is a member of the board of the New York Screen Actors' Guild.

In the fall of 2007 Landrón appeared in Maxwell Anderson’s Night Over Taos, directed by Estelle Parsons..

In 2009 he relocated to West Hollywood, Los Angeles, to pursue work in television and film. He currently lives in Los Angeles' Chinatown.

Landrón had two daughters.
