= Nikki Newman =

- The Young and the Restless character
- Melody Thomas Scott as Nikki Newman
- Portrayed by: Erica Hope (1978–1979); Melody Thomas Scott (1979–present); Robin Eisenman (1984)
- Duration: 1978–present
- First appearance: May 11, 1978
- Created by: William J. Bell
- Introduced by: William J. Bell and John Conboy (1978); Michael J. Weithorn (2001); Bradley Bell (2022)
- Crossover appearances: The King of Queens; The Bold and the Beautiful
In-universe information
- Other names: Nicole Reed; Nicole Newman; Nikki Reed; Nikki Foster; Nikki Abbott; Nikki Landers; Sherry
- Occupation: Businessperson; Socialite; Stripper
- Parents: Nicholas Reed; Barbara Reed
- Siblings: Casey Reed
- Spouse: Greg Foster (1979–1981); Kevin Bancroft (1982–1983); Tony DiSalvo (1983); Victor Newman (1984–1988, 1998, 2002–2008, 2013–present); Jack Abbott (1990–1994, 2012); Joshua Landers (1996–1998); David Chow (2008); Deacon Sharpe (2011–2012)
- Children: Dylan McAvoy; Victoria Newman; Nicholas Newman; John Abbott III
- Stepchildren: Adam Newman; Abby Newman
- Grandchildren: Cassie Newman (adoptive); Noah Newman; Claire Newman; Reed Hellstrom; Summer Newman; Faith Newman; Johnny Abbott; Katie Newman Abbott

Nikki Newman is a fictional character from The Young and the Restless, an American soap opera on the CBS network. Created and introduced by William J. Bell in 1978, the role was portrayed by Erica Hope before being recast to Melody Thomas Scott in 1979. Introduced as a stripper, the character became well known for her relationship with businessman Victor Newman (Eric Braeden), a union that developed into a supercouple pairing that has spanned over four decades. She shares two children with Victor: Victoria (Heather Tom/Amelia Heinle) and Nicholas Newman (Joshua Morrow). In 2013, she disclosed her previous decision to give up a child for adoption, who later turned out to be Dylan McAvoy (Steve Burton). The character has also had several other notorious relationships, including Paul Williams (Doug Davidson), Jack Abbott (Peter Bergman), and Brad Carlton (Don Diamont).

== Casting ==
The role of Nikki Reed was portrayed by actress Erica Hope from May 11, 1978, to February 19, 1979, in 58 episodes. The role was recast with Melody Thomas Scott (then Melody Thomas), who began appearing on February 20, 1979. Scott recalled in 1989 that she was surprised to have received the role, as she had not acted in several years; in 2023, she further referred to her recast as an "emergency" due to Hope's dismissal, following conflicts with several cast members. In 1984, Robin Eisenman temporarily portrayed the role.

In May 2001, Scott and the show's producers entered contract negotiations following rumors that she was unhappy because of Nikki's lack of airtime. Soap Opera Digest speculated that she was possibly joining General Hospital as Heather Webber. Three months later, controversy arose when Scott was seen moving personal belongings from her dressing room. However, speculation ended in August 2001, when it was announced that Scott had signed a contract to further extend her portrayal of Nikki.

In May 2009, Nelson Branco of TV Guide Canada reported that Scott had been asked to accept a salary cut, or be taken off her contract and dropped to a recurring status. The actress reportedly refused either option. Scott later began contract negotiations again, which resulted in Nikki being written out of the soap opera after an agreement could not be met. Scott later signed another contract to continue her portrayal, but in 2011, the actress' future was left in uncertainty, because of the soap opera's financial issues. Scott expressed disappointment, stating: "It was not handled very well. I've been in this business since I was three and I know how this works. If a show is having problems with money or budget, they call the actor very respectfully and say, "We have a little financial crunch here. Let's try to work something out, okay?" That's what should have happened. The problem was that such a phone call was never made to me and I was left in the lurch." However, Scott renewed her contract and returned after an onscreen absence.

In September 2022, a crossover event between The Young and the Restless and The Bold and the Beautiful was announced involving Scott’s character along with the Character Deacon Sharpe. Scott’s appearance on The Bold and the Beautiful occurred on September 26 of that year.

== Development ==
=== Characterization ===
According to the soap opera's website, the character "has matured from the girl from the wrong side of the tracks to the serial’s luminous and resourceful heroine." The Observer–Reporter described Nikki as "oft-married". Of playing the character's ongoing tragic life, Scott stated: "Ever since I have been an actress, which is 56 years now, I have always preferred high drama, angst, and catastrophes. I find it more interesting to play. I guess it’s no accident that I found my way into soap operas." In 1988, Scott stated in an interview that in her first nine years on the soap opera, she thought that Nikki had "grown up". In 1995, Scott said that she was "quite bored" with her character, stating: "We seem to be in a bit of a slump — all Nikki seems to do is have coffee and do needlepoint. She has beautiful clothes and her makeup is perfect and she never leaves her house. She used to sit here and drink — that was actually more fun. But needlepoint — I'm sorry." Speaking about Nikki's "desperation housewife" problems with Michael Logan of TV Guide, Scott stated, "Nikki should never have a job! She would never want a job. She's not capable of doing anything, and she wouldn't want to be trained to do anything. It's so much better when she stays home. I'm looking forward to playing her as a crazy old lady."

=== Relationships ===
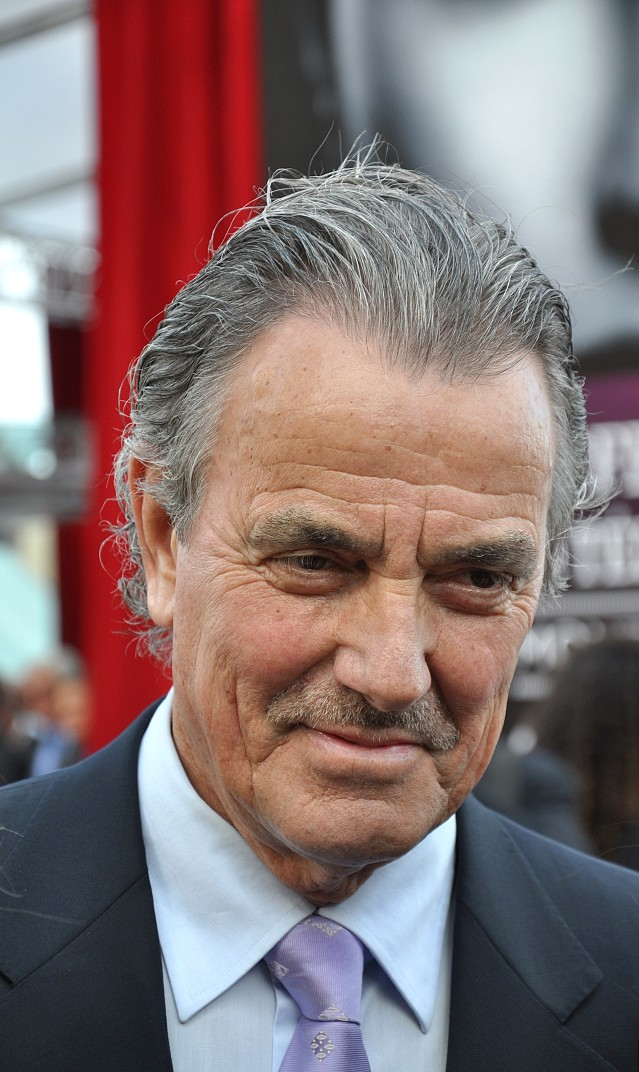
Eric Braeden portrays Victor, Nikki's main love interest for over four decades. Their union has registered "an enduring appeal" among viewers.

For over three decades, Nikki has been romantically linked with Victor Newman (Eric Braeden). Nikki was originally from the lower walks of life, having been a prostitute and stripper. After multiple failed relationships, she began a romance with Victor, who taught her about society. They fall in love and have a child, Victoria Newman (Amelia Heinle), and later a son, Nicholas Newman (Joshua Morrow). The couple are widely considered a supercouple within the soap opera media. The writers of The Young and the Restless detailed their characters to marry and divorce or depart from each other in some form or fashion in a continuous cycle, which is a take on the original supercouple formula. Soap Opera Digest relayed the beginning of the pairing's creation and their impact, described as an "inspired decision", led to Victor and Nikki becoming the series' most successful supercouple. In an interview with Dose magazine, Scott said that the couple always has to get back together, but not without a challenge.

"Nikki and Victor have played this cycle over and over again and it’s very successful because people care about them. I would imagine just because I’ve watched the show for 33 years as well as played it – they’ve got to get back together! There’s nothing else they could do! They have to get back together, as for how, I don’t know."

— Scott, on Nikki and Victor's "formula" (2012)

Nikki and Victor are recognized as one of daytime television's most prominent couples. They have also garnered a large fan following, dubbed "Niktor" by viewers. In addition, the couple's weddings have been reported by mainstream media. Scott has said: "Let’s face facts: Victor and Nikki will always be a huge dynamic, they’ve been in a circular cycle for over 30 years! Finding a new leading man that you have chemistry with is like finding gold." In a 1994 interview with The Los Angeles Times, the newspaper reported that Victor's relationship with Nikki had "registered an enduring appeal among viewers", with Braeden replying that, "Arguably, it's the idea of this incredibly powerful, wealthy man taking a woman who comes from the wrong side of the tracks into his life, and shaping her and forming her more to his liking. But, of course, no one can shape or form anyone, she remains who she is, has retained her strength, and that causes conflict." In other interviews, Braeden stated that he loves working with Scott and that he "always thought it was an honestly felt love story with great material for conflict with Nikki". He also stated in an interview that he considers Victor's storylines with Nikki to be some of his favorites. Discussing Victor and Nikki's union, former As the World Turns actress Martha Byrne stated: "Young and Restless' Victor and Nikki are the perfect example of a couple who they can tear apart and put back together how many times? And [the writers] do it really well because they're so stable as characters that you can basically do anything with them now, and the audience will go on the journey with them." The Museum of Television and Radio wrote: "Combined with a series of social-issue storylines covering everything from AIDS to date rape to the plight of the elderly, as well as featuring a group of popular young African-American characters, and several long-term romantic and professional relationships, Victor and Nikki's love story has kept viewers enthralled for many years." They also described their relationship as being a "dominant force" in the soap opera. Daytime journalist Michael Fairman stated: "Victor and Nikki just can’t, we mean can’t, ever get it together long enough to find any happiness with each other. So, many would say that they deserve each other and the baggage and betrayals that come along with their co-dependent relationship."

Aside from Victor, Nikki is known for her relationships with Paul Williams (Doug Davidson) and Jack Abbott (Peter Bergman), Victor's business rival. Tommy Garrett of Canyon News called the character the love of Paul's life. Nikki often "ditches" other men if Victor is in trouble; Scott called her leaving Brad Carlton (Don Diamont) at the altar following Victor being shot "another dramatic ditching". In 2012, she left Jack the day after their wedding to find a missing Victor; Scott commented, "It was written as it was, so I don’t speculate. She has done it before ... perhaps she will do it again." She stated that she doesn't desire for Nikki and Victor to be happy together for long because it is "boring" and there must be some kind of conflict. Teasing the Nikki and Victor storyline, Scott said that, "Trouble follows trouble and when it rains it pours." From 2010 onward, Nikki was in a relationship with Deacon Sharpe (Sean Kanan). However, it was later revealed that he was working with Meggie McClaine (Sean Young) to ruin her sobriety and send her back to rehab. However, Deacon began to fall for Nikki. Of their relationship, Scott stated: "Deacon has more balls than Nikki expected and he keeps coming back, determined to convince her he truly loves her. At one point, he slips the AA serenity prayer under her door, which she is disgusted to see. She just ignores it and drinks all night. She really does have feelings for him. But this betrayal is something she won't get over soon."

=== Illnesses ===
Over the course of her duration on the soap opera, the character has battled alcoholism, breast cancer and most recently, multiple sclerosis. Scott has stated in multiple interviews that she enjoys portraying Nikki's struggle with alcohol. In an interview with Entertainment Weekly in 2011, Scott said that she "loves Nikki drinking" and enjoys the material as an actress, stating: "It’s much more fun, and everybody seems to prefer a drunk Nikki." During the character's battle with alcoholism, she also developed an addiction for prescription pills. To the dismay of Scott, the storyline concluded abruptly. The actress said, "It never really finished properly. Nikki just woke up one day and decided that she's fine now. I felt that was unrealistic. I would like to follow Nikki through rehab and detox. I want to find a good conclusion. Maybe this new story line will address that. It's looking like it might." Scott has previously voiced her admiration for playing Nikki's alcoholism because "it's so much fun to play" a "drunk or insane or flawed".

In February 2013, it was revealed that Nikki would be diagnosed with multiple sclerosis (MS). Jillian Bowe of Zap2it said viewers got "a bit of shock when they saw the socialite’s hands shake after she tickled the ivories in her new deluxe apartment." Scott discussed the storyline with TV Guide. She said she wants the story to "educate people" that it's "controllable with the proper treatment". Not all people can easily "control" their MS. MS is a highly variable and often disabling disease, and effects each person very differently. Scott met a worker on the set of the show who was diagnosed with MS, and said it was "very encouraging" to know about her for the storyline. She further said, "I did have a sit-down meeting, a little three-way with [head writer] Josh Griffith and [executive producer] Jill Farren Phelps. They wanted to know how I felt about the idea, and I told them I thought it was great. Josh didn't know I used to play piano on Y&R way back when, so he decided to revive that and use it to show the beginnings of Nikki's symptoms — the shaky hands, the cramping, the feeling you've got arthritis."

=== Rivalries and friendships ===
Nikki is known for her rivalries with Ashley Abbott (Eileen Davidson), Jill Abbott (Jess Walton), Sharon Newman (Sharon Case) and Diane Jenkins (Maura West). She fought with Diane over Victor for years as their bitter rivalry climaxed; she later killed Diane in self-defense in August 2011. Scott didn't think Nikki should have been the killer in a whodunnit? storyline. She stated, "Nikki has always hated Diane and because Maura is so good in the role, Nikki hates her even more now." Sharon is Nikki's former daughter-in-law, having been married to her son Nicholas (Joshua Morrow) for over a decade. Nikki later became outraged when Sharon had a brief romance with Victor. Luke Kerr of Zap2it said: "It’s always reassuring to know Nikki will usually jump to "blame Sharon" for just about everything. Based on their past, it's not surprising, but it's a comfort food type Y&R trope." Nikki and Sharon even ended up in a physical fight in the Newman stables over Victor in 2012; Jillian Bowe, also of Zap2it, called it the "Newman Divas" face off, and said, "Victor's ladies go for blood. It boggles the mind these two sophisticated women are fighting over Victor's giblets and gravy." Scott stated that she loved the Newman stables fight, saying: "Our director was very gracious, and was very loose and not rigid about blocking, and let us do our own choreography. So, if you look at it again, there are many elements of an I Love Lucy episode. Guess where that came from? But I couldn’t resist it. I had to do it! All the water and hair pulling and dunking in the bucket, that was all me, because that was "Lucy"!"

Amid her rivalries with most women in Genoa City, she is close with the show's matriarch Katherine Chancellor (Jeanne Cooper), Scott said that "Katherine and Nikki have a very special relationship, and they have a very special heartbeat". However, off-screen, there was a period of time in which Scott experienced a "rocky" relationship with Cooper. Cooper explained: "It was just some silly thing, I guess [...] You think it’s strange. You should have been me! I mean, here is someone who is like a daughter to me. I really was very protective of her".

== Storylines ==
Nikki was introduced with her sister Casey in 1978. The following year, she killed her abusive father Nick Reed (Quinn Redeker) in self-defense after he drunkenly tried to rape her. During the murder trial, Jill Foster (Brenda Dickson) hired a Nick look-alike named Joseph Thomas to scare Nikki and Casey. Following the trial, she dated Paul Williams (Doug Davidson), but it ended after he gave her a venereal disease. Nikki would go on to romance Greg Foster (Wings Hauser). While Paul opposed the relationship, she ultimately married Greg. Rose DeVille (Darlene Conley) signed Nikki to a "modelling agency" which was later revealed to be a prostitution ring. Nikki resisted a customer, who later had a heart attack. A man named Tony was charged for the murder, with Greg representing him. Nikki was threatened not to testify in the case or Greg would be killed. She decided to leave town, but returned a little while later. Nikki would later join the New World Commune and Paul would join her. However, they discovered that it was actually a cult, and Nikki would become pregnant after being raped by a cult leader, Ian Ward. Steven Williams and Peggy Brooks worked to expose the cult, and Nikki ended up escaping to Chicago. She gave birth to the child, later to be known as Dylan McAvoy, in a church, but passed out during labor and the nuns took the baby away. Greg, thinking Nikki and Paul had reunited, divorced Nikki. Once Nikki returned to Genoa City, she became a stripper while romancing Kevin Bancroft (Christopher Holder). Kevin's mother Allison Bancroft (Lynn Wood) hated Nikki, and bought a pornographic film titled Hot Hips, purportedly starring Nikki, hoping Kevin would leave her, which he did. A criminal named Tony DiSalvo distributed the film. Nikki married him in hopes of getting her hands on the film rights, and later found out she wasn't even in the film. Paul and his partner Andy Richards investigated Tony and killed him.

While still a stripper, she had a fling with rich business tycoon Victor Newman (Eric Braeden), and became pregnant with his child. Initially, however, Nikki believed that the child was Kevin's, but it turned out to be Victor's. She gave birth to Victoria in 1982 while still married to Kevin. After Tony's death, Victor moved on with Lorie Brooks (Jamie Lyn Bauer), while Nikki hooked up with Rick Daros. Unknown to Nikki, Rick killed his first wife and intended on doing the same to Nikki. Once Victor learned of Rick and Victoria's true paternity, he, Paul, and Andy rushed to St. Croix to save Nikki. In a gunfight, Rick escaped while a shot Victor professed his love for Nikki and proposed. Once Victor recovered, he and Nikki married in 1984 despite interference from his ex Eve Howard. Eve had previously tried to kill Nikki before the wedding ceremony, later running off with Rick Daros. Victor and Nikki's marriage was strong until he had an affair with Ashley Abbott (Eileen Davidson), the sister of rival businessman Jack Abbott (Terry Lester). At the same time, Jack was attracted to Nikki, and they began an affair. Victor left Nikki for Ashley who ended up pregnant, but secretly had an abortion. Nikki schemed to break up Victor and Ashley by using Matt Miller (Victor's brother) to seduce Ashley, but failed. Nikki was soon diagnosed with a terminal illness bringing Victor back. Once she recovered and lied to Victor about it, Victor returned to Ashley until he learned of her abortion. Nikki ended up giving birth to a son, Nicholas Newman (Joshua Morrow), but shortly thereafter Victor divorced Nikki thinking she was involved in Jack's role in a tell-all biography about Victor. Unknown to Victor, the book was actually written by Leanna Love (Barbara Crampton).

Once Victor learned the truth of Leanna's book, he tried to win back Nikki through a business deal with Jack (now Peter Bergman). Yet the deal fell through and, out of spite, Jack and Nikki married in 1990 as Victor ended up marrying Ashley. Her marriage to Jack was unsuccessful; his business with Jabot Cosmetics got in the way of their "friendly" marriage. Following a riding accident where she miscarried a child of hers and Jack's, she sunk into a state of depression, developing addictions to painkillers and being an alcoholic to help her recovery. Victor would eventually return to Nikki's side in her addictions, but Nikki ended up pregnant with Jack's son. After an argument with Victor, Nikki gave birth to a stillborn, John Abbott III, and Jack divorced Nikki, but they remained friends. Nikki was devastated soon after when Victor "died" after finding a burned body inside his car in Kansas, although it turned out he was alive. Victor had been living in Kansas with Hope Adams (Signy Coleman). Nikki during this time began a relationship with Brad Carlton (Don Diamont) and later got engaged. Victor and Hope came back to Genoa City, much to everyone's amazement. On the night of Nikki and Brad's wedding, Victor was shot by Mari Jo Mason. She left Brad at the altar and rushed to Victor's side. Victor ended up choosing to return to Hope.

While Victor returned to Kansas, Nikki married her doctor Dr. Joshua Landers (Heath Kizzier). Victor's relationship with Hope ended, and he returned to Genoa City to stop Nikki and Joshua from marrying. However, Victor would go on to get involved with Jack's former lover Diane Jenkins (Alex Donelley). Jealous of Diane, Nikki convinced Victor to have a vasectomy before she secretly stored his sperm in a bank. Joshua was shot and killed by his presumed dead mentally ill ex-wife, Veronica (Candice Daly), who had disguised herself and had been posing as Nikki and Joshua's maid, Sarah Lindsey. Hours later, having been the victim of emotional abuse from Nikki for many months, Veronica shot and severely wounded her employer, leading Victor to divorce Diane and remarry Nikki on her deathbed. Victor promised Diane that he would remarry her after Nikki died. When Nikki miraculously recovered, Victor decided to be with her instead of Diane. Yet, Victor was still legally married to Diane and their divorce continued into 2000. Diane remained in love with Victor and stole his sperm to impregnate herself with his child. However, Ashley and Nikki too stole the sperm and a mix-up was created. Ashley became pregnant with Victor's child and Diane with Jack's. Ashley gave birth to Abby Carlton (Brad was thought to be the father) and Nikki was engaged to Victor by 2002. Their engagement was hindered by Victor's old fiancée Lorie Brooks and her soon to be ex-husband Max Hollister schemed to break them up. Max was involved in a bad business deal with Victor regarding Julia Newman Martin's design firm. In the end, Lorie couldn't follow through, and Victor and Nikki remarried in September.

Shortly into Victor and Nikki's remarriage, Nikki was kidnapped resulting in post-traumatic stress disorder and was shot by a carjacker. Nikki began having more memories about her childhood and ended up having an affair with Bobby Marsino, who was the brother of one of Nikki's childhood friends whom she accidentally killed. In 2005, their granddaughter Cassie (Camryn Grimes) was killed in a car accident. Then, Nikki developed more of an interest in business. Several years earlier, with Jabot in dire straits, Nikki gave them $35 million to help get the company out of debt. Nikki then became a stockholder at the company and had a seat on the board; much to everyone's dismay. Nikki later sold her stock to start her own company, NVP Retreats (a wellness spa company). In 2007, she ran against ex-husband Jack in the race for Wisconsin state senate, but after a few mistakes and being caught on tape kissing her campaign manager, David Chow (Vincent Irizarry), she lost the election. Victor and Nikki eventually divorced, fueled by her involvement with David Chow. She walked away with a $100-million divorce settlement. After Katherine Chancellor stepped down as CEO of Jabot, Nikki took over; this caused tension between Nikki and Katherine's "daughter" Jill. Nikki stepped down as CEO of Jabot after hearing that David had killed Ji Min Kim, Jill's current lover. Regardless, Nikki married David Chow in June 2008 in Mexico. It was revealed that he was addicted to gambling. Paul Williams investigated David and found that "David" was not even his real name. Upon learning David was going to drug her, Nikki was going to ask for a divorce. However, David died in a car accident, which also killed Victor's wife Sabrina Newman. Victor and Nikki's relationship as friends broke down around this time, too, after she tried to console him. After Victor disappeared again, Nikki became determined to find him, however, she ended up getting involved with her early love, private investigator and long time friend Paul, while Victor and Ashley reconnected. By May 2009, Nikki accepted Paul's marriage proposal, but the night before their wedding, she broke things off and left town. She once again returned, and after Victor was shot by Patty Williams, Nikki left with him after a heart transplant to undergo rehabilitation in a center in Europe.

When Victor and Nikki returned in 2010, they were engaged. Meggie McClaine, a friend of Victor, had moved in for her own protection. Meggie sabotaged Nikki, getting her drunk so that she could marry Victor instead of Nikki. Meggie recruited Deacon Sharpe to help get Nikki off the wagon. Nikki went to rehab. When she learned of Victor and Meggie's marriage (which was just a scam to have Meggie caught) she had an affair with Deacon, ending her relationship with Victor. Nikki continued her romance with Deacon, without knowing the truth. Nikki and Victor slept together after he lost a lawsuit against his children; however, he was involved with Diane Jenkins at the time. Upon learning the truth about Deacon's role in her drinking, Nikki left him but it was too late for her to return to Victor, who had married Diane. Alone, she began drinking once again. After several attempts at trying to get back together, Victor and Nikki parted ways, and she returned to rehab. Diane was killed months after, and Victor was jailed for her murder.

After being missing from rehab for several months, Nikki returned home. She confesses that she escaped rehab to help her family in the aftermath of the Diane Jenkin's murder investigation. Deacon threatened to confess that he saw Victor, Victoria and Nicholas in the park the night of Diane's murder unless Nikki would marry him; she agreed. Nikki began having memory lapses of her night in the park with Diane; realizing that she had killed her, not Victor. She confessed to this at Victor's trial. Detective Ronan Malloy arrested Nikki for the murder; however, footage from the night, shot by Deacon, revealed that while Nikki did kill Diane at the park, it was in self-defense. Additional footage showed that Deacon finished her off, serving the last fatal blow to Diane's head. Deacon was jailed and his marriage to Nikki ended. Nikki's brief relationship with Victor failed; she began to reconnect with Jack who was suffering from a gunshot wound from Patty Williams that had left him paralyzed. Their relationship heated up, much to the dismay of Kyle, yet he came to accept the relationship, and Nikki and Jack remarried. Yet, the day of her marriage, Victor remarried Sharon Newman, but then went suddenly missing. Nikki ended up leaving Genoa City to try to find Victor, but to no avail. When she returned, Jack decided they should divorce. Victor later returned, having lived in Los Angeles with amnesia. He reunited with Nikki and set out to destroy Sharon and Tucker McCall who took control of Newman during his absence. After Victor lost control of Newman to Jack through a hostile takeover, Victor suffered a heart attack, and later Sharon burned down the Newman Ranch during a mental breakdown. Once Victor escaped the hospital to visit the ruins, he and Nikki finally got engaged. However, their wedding was delayed because Nikki was diagnosed with multiple sclerosis.

Victor and Nikki finally remarried on March 20, 2013, in a ceremony that ended with Adam Newman (Michael Muhney) taking an assassin's bullet meant for Victor. Adam survived, and he and Victor began to rebuild their relationship. Nikki continued with her MS treatments, and held fundraisers for research. Katherine Chancellor died in August after a three-month vacation around the world. Katherine left Nikki and Jill in charge of her memorial service, and left Nikki a letter encouraging her to look into the child she had following her stay at the New World Commune. The child is later revealed to be Dylan McAvoy (Steve Burton), the son of Nikki and Paul.

== Reception ==
"Nikki has done some outrageous things, from sleeping with Victor's worst enemy, Jack Abbott, to hitting the bottle and blacking out. Victor gets disgusted with Nikki's actions, yet he always find his way right back to her bed. No matter how many men Nikki sleeps with, she finds her way back to Victor as well."

— Jae Jones of Yahoo! on Nikki's storylines over the years (2011)

The character and actress are considered icons in American daytime television. TV Guide has said that Scott has become "immensely popular" over the course of her run. Michael Fairman of On-Air On-Soaps describes Scott as the "leading lady of Y&R". BuzzWorthy Radio wrote that Scott is "a true fan favorite and daytime royalty". Former executive producer and head writer Maria Arena Bell called Nikki one of the "hearts and souls" on the soap opera, and said: "Melody is a phenomenal actress. Nikki is one of the great core characters of The Young and the Restless." Nikki's pairing with Victor has received positive reviews from critics throughout the years; The News & Advance cited Victor and Nikki with other romances considered "epic" of the early supercouple era. Global News wrote of their long-standing relationship, "Victor is the consummate womanizer and has been a part of many relationships over the years. Nonetheless, his heart belongs to one woman alone, the stunning Nikki Reed. Despite true love and good intention, the relationship between Victor and Nikki has always been troubled by poor timing and miscommunication." Jae Jones of Yahoo! wrote in 2011, "Over the years fans have watch Victor and Nikki break up and get back together more times than they can keep track. The love between the two has always been strong, but it doesn't seem strong enough to keep the two together." In 1987, Lilana Novakovich of the Toronto Star wrote that Nikki was the "lucky missus of the sexy Eric Braeden". A syndicated article that appeared in The Vindicator in 2003 stated of Nikki and Victor's relationship, "Their relationship is both strong and mistrustful, fraught with passion and tension." The Austin American-Statesman acclaimed Scott's portrayal in 1991, writing: "After 12 long years of portraying Nikki Newman Abbott on The Young and the Restless, Melody Thomas Scott has become a master at tackling one on-screen dilemma after another. Since Nikki's arrival in Genoa City back in 1979, she has been brainwashed by a bizarre religious cult; gotten caught up in the world of striptease and circa 1987 miraculously survived a "fatal" disease called sarcoidosis." In October 1992, Marla Hart of the Chicago Tribune wrote of the character's life at the time, saying: "There's the Newman living room and its bar, where Nikki has gotten plastered; the ruffly bedroom where she has fretted over her two main squeezes, Jack Abbott and Victor Newman; and Victor's marble-ized office, where Nikki Newman Abbott has cried on the leather sofa scores of times." In 2002, Entertainment Weekly wrote that the soap opera was "keeping it real" with Victor and Nikki's third wedding. Upon their fourth wedding in 2013, the magazine stated: "Say what you will about Victor (and we’ve all said a lot), but the ol’ boy definitely knows who is best for him — Nikki."

In 2006, when Scott celebrated 27 years on the soap opera, the Jamaica Gleaner wrote of her portrayal and the character's evolution, "As Nikki Reed Newman — a character who has been married seven times (twice to Victor), been addicted to alcohol and pain pills, killed her sexual-molester father and been shot several times — Melody has an exciting alter ego. Through it all, Nikki has matured into the strong, independent woman that she is today." In 2011, the soap opera's ratings reportedly decreased when Scott was absent. When she renewed her contract with the series, Michael Logan of TV Guide wrote: "Our long national nightmare is over! Execs at The Young and the Restless have finally seen the light and are bringing Melody Thomas Scott back to the show." He also wrote that it was "not a smooth move" to keep Scott off the soap opera, saying: "Considering Thomas Scott was at the top of storyline — and giving the performance of her career — when Nikki suddenly left Genoa City and went into rehab. Curiously, those money issues at Y&R didn't stop the suits from hiring lots of new high-profile faces in recent months, including Emmy-winning suds greats Genie Francis and Debbi Morgan — a fact that did not go ignored by Thomas Scott's legion of irate fans who organized a massive Twitter campaign to bring their girl back." Lori Harito of Global wrote that "the woman we love to hate" would be "back on our screens, no doubt butting heads with Victor Newman".

Sara Bibel of Xfinity wrote that she had hoped Nikki's relationship with Deacon Sharpe (Sean Kanan) would blossom into a "real romance". She also wrote about Nikki and Victor's union, stating: "Nikki and Victor’s (Eric Braeden) romance has lasted three decades because they were separated for years at a time, involved in fully developed, longterm relationships with other characters, while continuing to be drawn into each other’s orbit. It’s a shame that the current regime has not realized the story potential of keeping these characters apart." Bibel criticized Nikki's reunion with Jack in 2012, blaming it on the soap opera's "creative trouble". She wrote: "They were a great couple the first time they got together. There seemed like a parallel between the back problems that Nikki was struggling with when they were married and Jack’s paralysis. It seemed like the recipe for a beautiful love story, as Nikki helped Jack realize that he was still desirable despite his injury and help him adjust to the changes in his life until, being that this is a soap, he miraculously regains the ability to walk again. Instead of watching a friendship bloom into romance, Jack and Nikki hooked up one night in Vegas and, bam, instant relationship." The following year, she predicted Nikki could be potentially diagnosed with either multiple sclerosis or Parkinson's disease. Bibel wrote that she usually finds soap opera medical storylines "tedious because I know going in that the character will inevitably be cured. But giving a character a chronic but manageable illness is a fresh spin."

Scott's portrayal has garnered numerous accolades throughout the years, including nominations for the Daytime Emmy Award for Outstanding Lead Actress in a Drama Series in 1999 and the Special Fan Award in 2001. She has received six Soap Opera Digest Award nominations, winning once in 2001 for Outstanding Lead Actress.

In 2022, Charlie Mason from Soaps She Knows placed Nikki third (just after Jack and behind Victor) on his list of the best 25 characters from The Young and the Restless, commenting that "Melody Thomas Scott's character practically defines the term "rags to riches"… except for the fact that when she caught the eye of the character at No. 2 [Victor], the then-stripper from the wrong side of the tracks was wearing less than rags. We also can't resist the fact that, while snobbish Nikki isn't to the manor born, she certainly acts like she's for the manor made." In 2024, Mason included Nikki in his list of the best mothers in American soap operas, joking that she is "the more fun parent with whom to judge party guests" and writing, "Sure, she once slept with a horseman who’'d go on to marry daughter Victoria. Nikki is still the Newman likeliest to try to keep anyone from stampeding at the ranch". Mason also placed Nikki 10th on his ranked list of Soaps' 40 Most Iconic Characters of All Time, commenting, "Since the recovering alcoholic can't, we'll raise a glass to the stripper-turned-exec that since 1979 Melody Thomas Scott has kept as unpredictable as a Friday cliffhanger".

== See also ==
- Victor and Nikki Newman
- Supercouple – Popular or wealthy pairing
