= List of The Young and the Restless cast members =

The Young and the Restless is an American television soap opera, created by William J. Bell and Lee Phillip Bell for CBS. It debuted on March 26, 1973. The longest-running cast members are Melody Thomas Scott and Eric Braeden, who portray Nikki and Victor Newman, having joined in February 1979 and February 1980, respectively, making them two of the longest-tenured actors in American soap operas. Jeanne Cooper, who portrayed the soap opera's matriarch Katherine Chancellor, previously held the record for the series' longest-running cast member, airing from November 1973 until her death in May 2013. Kate Linder, who has portrayed Esther Valentine since April 1982, serves as the third longest-running cast member. Lauralee Bell (Christine Blair) and Jess Walton (Jill Abbott) share the title of fourth and fifth longest-tenured actors on the soap. The following list is of cast members who are currently on the show: both main and recurring members, as well as those who are debuting, departing or returning to the series.

== Cast ==
=== Main cast ===
Main cast members
Actor	Character	Duration
Peter Bergman	Jack Abbott	1989–present
Peter Bergman	Marco Annicelli	2015
Eric Braeden	Victor Newman	1980–present
Sharon Case	Sharon Newman	1994–present
Sean Dominic	Nate Hastings	2019–present
Melissa Claire Egan	Chelsea Lawson	2011–present
Hayley Erin	Abby Newman	2008–2010
Hayley Erin	Claire Newman	2023–present
Billy Flynn	Cane Ashby	2025–present
Michael Graziadei	Daniel Romalotti	2004–2013, 2016, 2022–present
Camryn Grimes	Cassie Newman	1997–2007, 2009–2010, 2013–2014, 2020–2021, 2024
Camryn Grimes	Mariah Copeland	2014–present
Mark Grossman	Adam Newman	2019–present
Amelia Heinle	Victoria Newman	2005–present
Courtney Hope	Sally Spectra	2020–present
Bryton James	Devon Winters	2004–present
Christel Khalil	Lily Winters	2002–present
Christian LeBlanc	Michael Baldwin	1991–1993, 1997–present
Kate Linder	Esther Valentine	1982–present
Michael Mealor	Kyle Abbott	2018–present
Joshua Morrow	Nicholas Newman	1994–present
Melody Thomas Scott	Nikki Newman	1979–present
Zuleyka Silver	Audra Charles	2022–present
Michelle Stafford	Phyllis Summers	1994–1997, 2000–2013, 2019–present
Michelle Stafford	Sheila Carter	2006–2007
Jason Thompson	Billy Abbott	2016–present
Jason Thompson	John Abbott	2017
Susan Walters	Diane Jenkins Abbott	2001–2004, 2010, 2022–present

=== Recurring and guest cast ===
Recurring and guest cast members
Actor	Character	Duration
Lucas Adams	Wesley	2012
Lucas Adams	Noah Newman	2025–present
Lauralee Bell	Christine Blair	1983–2006, 2010–present
Tamara Braun	Sienna Bacall	2025–present
Tracey E. Bregman	Lauren Fenmore Baldwin	1983–1995, 2000–present
Tracey E. Bregman	Sarah Smythe	2010
Jere Burns	Laurence Markham	2026
Ashley Campbell	Coco Spectra	2026
Tina Casciani	Riza Thomson	2019–2020, 2026
Reylynn Caster	Faith Newman	2021–present
Ethan Ray Clark	Dominic Winters	2026
Matt Cohen	Detective Burrows	2025–present
Christopher Cousins	Alan Laurent	2024–present
Michael Damian	Danny Romalotti	1981–1998, 2002–2004, 2008, 2012–2013, 2022–present
Patrika Darbo	Shirley Spectra	2021, 2026
Eileen Davidson	Ashley Abbott	1982–1988, 1999–present
Cait Fairbanks	Tessa Porter	2017–present
Vivica A. Fox	Stephanie Simmons	1994–1995, 2026
David "Shark" Fralick	Larry Warton	1995–96, 1999–2005, 2026
Stacy Haiduk	Patty Williams	2009–2012, 2015–2016, 2026
Jade Harlow	Marie Kirkland	2026
Elizabeth Hendrickson	Chloe Mitchell	2008–2017, 2019–present
Roger Howarth	Matt Clark	2025–present
Tetona Jackson	Roxanne Barrington	2026
Catherine Kresge	Annie Stewart	2025–present
Loren Lott	Ana Hamilton	2018–2019, 2024–present
Judah Mackey	Connor Newman	2019–present
Beth Maitland	Traci Abbott	1982–1996, 1999, 2001–2002, 2006–present
Sienna Mercuri	Katie Abbott	2016–present
Paxton Mishkind	Johnny Abbott	2022–present
Shemar Moore	Malcolm Winters	1994–2002, 2004–2005, 2014, 2019, 2023, 2026
Mishael Morgan	Hilary Curtis	2013–2019
Mishael Morgan	Amanda Sinclair	2019–present
Redding Munsell	Harrison Locke	2024–present
Lily Brooks O'Briant	Lucy Romalotti	2023–present
Melissa Ordway	Abby Winters	2013–present
Nathan Owens	Holden Novak	2025–present
Valarie Pettiford	Amy Lewis	2024–present
Veronica Redd	Mamie Johnson	1990–1995, 1999–2004, 2023–present
Greg Rikaart	Kevin Fisher	2003–present
Leigh-Ann Rose	Imani Benedict	2020–present
Jess Walton	Jill Abbott	1987–present
Fareed Ward	Andrew Bishop	2026
Alex Wilson	Christian Newman	2019–present
