= Jim Wolf (musician) =

American singer/songwriter

James Matthew Wolf is an American singer-songwriter best known for his commercial success in South Korea with the hit single, "Make You My Lady."

== Early life ==
Jim Wolf
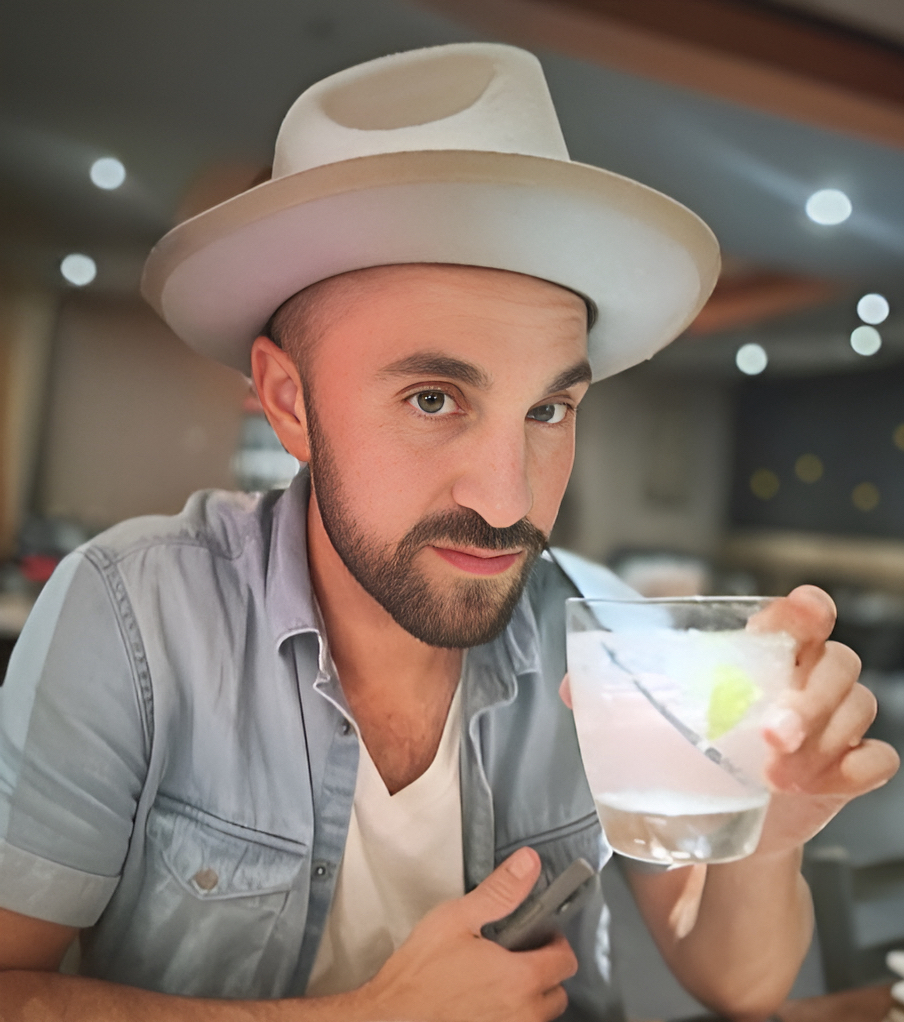

Background information
- Born: James Matthew Wolf; December 4, 1979; Norwalk, Connecticut, U.S.
- Origin: Fairfield, Connecticut, U.S.
- Genres: Pop, Rock, Singer-Songwriter
- Occupations: Singer-Songwriter, Producer
- Instruments: Vocals, guitar, bass, synth, ukulele, QChord
- Years active: 2005–present
- Label: Peermusic
- Website: Jim Wolf official site

Wolf grew up in Fairfield, Connecticut. Wolf began making music in 1995 after becoming inspired watching his brother's band, Villanova Junction., which at the time featured a young John Mayer. At a young age, Wolf participated in writing and recording sessions with the band, which led him to pursue his own career in music. In November 1994, Wolf bought his first guitar at Sam Ash Music in New Haven, Connecticut, with the members of Villanova Junction. At the time, the band was playing electric guitars, and they felt it would be best for Jim to start with the same setup. After some deliberation, they chose a sunburst Fender Stratocaster Tex/Mex and a small retro Epiphone amp.

Switching to acoustic felt more natural to Wolf. He spent his early years playing in many local bands across Connecticut before setting out on his own as a solo artist and finding himself performing original pop-folk music in the club and bar scene of New York City, where he met and played alongside acts such as The Alternate Routes, Charley Crockett, and Mark Normand (comedian).

== Career ==
Wolf is signed as both an artist and songwriter with Peermusic Group Worldwide (via Peermusic Korea). Wolf has been represented by Neon Entertainment for college and corporate events since 2009.

Wolf has been performing live and touring across the U.S. for nearly two decades. In addition to domestic tours, Wolf has also toured Singapore and South Korea, which included a press tour in 2019. Over the years, Wolf has released five independent full-length albums, along with 18 singles and EPs, which have garnered moderate airplay on both commercial and independent radio stations across the U.S. Notable airplay includes stations such as The Mountain Radio KHTP 103.7, 99.1 WPLR, and WMRQ-FM Radio 104.1, as well as international airplay on TBS Traffic Broadcasting System Radio Korea and MBC Munhwa Broadcasting Corporation Radio. Wolf also made an appearance on the Anna & Raven Morning Show, which is syndicated to 36 radio markets nationwide, to discuss the success of the song "Make You My Lady."

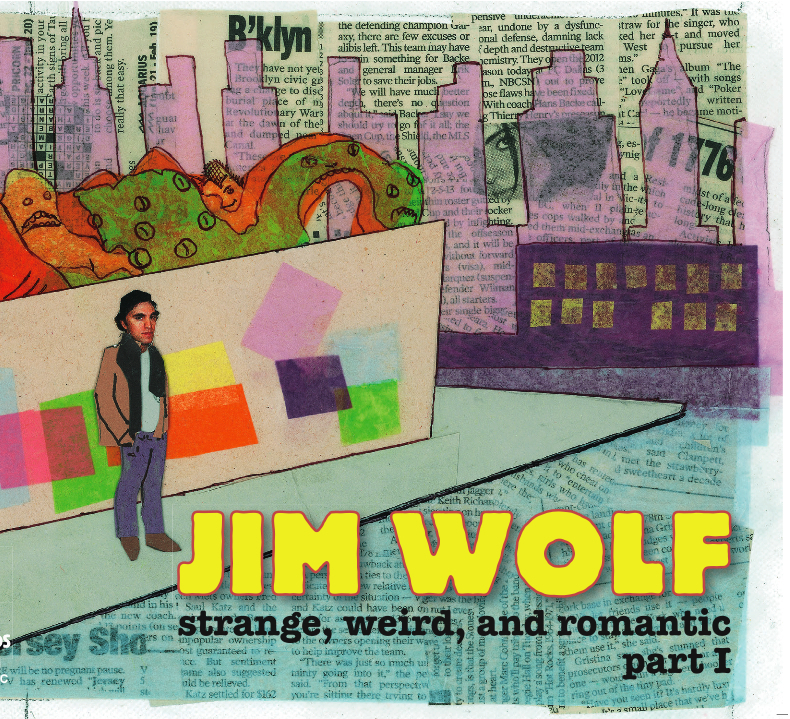
EP by Jim Wolf (released in 2012)

Wolf's success in South Korea harkens back to 2014 when his single, “Make You My Lady,” was used in a wedding video for popular actors Chae Rim and Gao Zi Qi.

Wolf's single "Make You My Lady" from part 1 of the series "Strange, Weird, and Romantic", landed in the top 100 Mnet (TV channel) Comprehensive Pop Charts for Asia in October–November 2014 for three weeks, peaking at #44 above “Let It Go” by Idina Menzel and staying in the Top 50 for 19 days. "Make You My Lady" was included in a Korean drama, gaining him international exposure.

"Make You My Lady" continued to see streaming success for many years; peaking at #2 on Melon (online music service) Top 100 Country/Folk/Blues (해외 포크/블루스/컨트리) chart as recently as January 14, 2019 (01월), "Make You My Lady" peaked at #2 on Melon (online music service) Top 100 Country/Folk/Blues chart (해외 포크/블루스/컨트리), where it stayed in place for 9 days, averaging 2nd place for the weekly chart(↓↑ 주간차트) of January 14 to January 20. and ended up in the Top 3 songs for the monthly chart (월간차트) of January (01월) in the same year. Melon is South Korea's largest music subscription service, with over 28 million users. Melon is the most popular music streaming service in South Korea.

Wolf independently released several acoustic and folk recordings, gradually building an international audience. His music gained particular traction in South Korea, where it was featured across media and maintained long-term streaming performance on regional platforms.

In February 2026, Wolf was included in Rolling Stone UK's "Top 10 Spotlight Artists" feature.

In March 2026, Billboard Brasil named Wolf among its "10 Artists to Watch" for the year, highlighting emerging international artists gaining attention across multiple markets.

== Songs In Popular Television - Asia ==
"Make You My Lady" by Jim Wolf was featured in ‘如果爱第2季’ (translated as ‘If You Love’ or ‘If Love’), Season 2, Episode 6, which premiered on August 6, 2015. '如果爱' is a Chinese television series that also stars popular South Korean actors, including Lee Kwang-soo. In this particular episode, Zhang Meng (张檬), known professionally as Lemon Zhang, and Fan Shi Qi (范世錡) begin an intimate relationship.

The Korean Broadcasting System KBS Network television series titled ‘잘 부탁드립니다’ (roughly translated as ‘Please Take Care of Me’) featured the song "Make You My Lady” by Jim Wolf in Episode 3 (3회) (aired on February 28, 2016). The song plays at the timestamp 42:52. This reality show centers around Kaolion Cosmetics, a pioneering natural cosmetics company in Korea. To help manage the employees' vacation time, celebrity stand-ins 은지원 (Eun Ji-won), 김종민 (Kim Jong-min), in Gangnam (강남) — popular South Korean entertainers — step in to oversee the skincare needs of both domestic and international customers.

"Make You My Lady" was used as background music on the South Korean television series My Secret Romance (Hangul: 애타는 로맨스; RR: Aetaneun Romaenseu), a 2017 drama starring Sung Hoon (actor) and Song Ji-eun. It aired during Episode 11, titled "I'm the Only One Who Can't Date" (나만 안 되는 연애), which was first broadcast on Monday, May 23, 2017, on the cable network OCN and rebroadcast the following day.

On October 26, 2017, the EBS Educational Broadcasting System featured "Make You My Lady" by Wolf on a documentary series titled ‘불의 땅 물의 고향 캄차카 4부 대륙 끝에서 만난 행복’ (translated as ‘Land of Fire, Home of Water: Kamchatka - Happiness Found at the End of the Continent, Part 4’). This episode, titled ‘개썰매, 밀키온천, 아바차만 낚시 투어배, 낚시배 선장과의 에피소드’ (translated as ‘Dog Sledding, Milky Hot Springs, Avacha Bay Fishing Tour Boat: Episode with the Fishing Boat Captain’), showcased the natural beauty and unique experiences of Kamchatka, Russia - and debuted the song at the 12:51 mark.

In the following year, 2018, South Korean primetime TV drama ‘Heart Signal 2' used "Make You My Lady," a mainstay single by Wolf, as background music (BGM) in two different episodes. The track appeared in Episode 4 and Episode 8 of the series.

"I’m Here For You" is featured in two episodes of ‘So I Married the Anti-fan’ a 2021 South Korean streaming television series starring Choi Tae-joon, Choi Soo-young, Hwang Chan-sung, Han Ji-an and Kim Min-kyu. “I’m Here For You” was featured on Episode 4 and Episode 11. The series is produced by Warner Bros. and Godin Media. All episodes are available on Rakuten Viki.

Other songs by Wolf appeared in multiple episodes of 'So I Married The Anti-Fan' TV series in 2021, including Episode 9, which featured “Who Am I?” by Jim Wolf: “Forever Sunday,” featured in Episode 13 of the series, and “Just To Be With You (Featuring Tessa Allison)” showcased in Episode 15.

On September 25, 2018, the acoustic version of Wolf's “Make You My Lady” was featured in Episode 5 of the Chinese television hit ‘Heart Signal (Chinese TV series),’ a popular Chinese dating reality show modeled after the South Korean series with the same title. Episode 5 was titled《心动的信号 悠享版》 悠享版第5期 (or Signal of Heartbeat: Leisure Edition, Episode 5).

On October 25, 2018, Wolf's song "Make You My Lady" was featured on the debut episode of ‘IZ*ONE CHU,’ a popular South Korean based television show. The show highlights the activities of IZ*ONE, a K-pop and J-pop crossover girl group signed to Off the Record, Swing Entertainment, EMI, Vernalossom label. Episode 1 or [1회] '두근두근' 첫 MT를 앞둔 비글력 만렙의 아이즈원, which translates to 'Excited' IZ*ONE's Beagle-level Maximum Energy Before Their First Memebership Training.

"Make You My Lady" was featured in Episode 6 (6회) of the reality dating show '비포 썸 라이즈' (Before Sunrise), which aired on February 18, 2019, on the MBN (Maeil Broadcasting Network) network. The song debuted during a segment where the two main cast members, Haneul (하늘) and Gilhwan (길환), are shown as a couple visiting the Seville Cathedral in Spain.

Other songs by Jim Wolf such as “Door’s Open (Feat. Meghann Wright)’ were featured in South Korean broadcast including on Episode 320 ([320 회]) titled 웃음버튼 (‘Laugh Button’) of the South Korean reality series ‘나 혼자 산다’ (translated as ‘I Live Alone (TV program)’) aired on the MBC network (Munhwa Broadcasting Corporation) on November 15, 2019, and the song can be found at the 1:38 timestamp.

"Make You My Lady" was featured in Episode 346 of the South Korean reality television series ‘나 혼자 산다’ (translated as ‘I Live Alone (TV program)’), which aired on the MBC network (Munhwa Broadcasting Corporation) in South Korea. The show, known for showcasing the daily lives of celebrities living independently, and highlights the personal and often humorous moments of its celebrity participants, offering viewers a glimpse into their private lives. Pak Se-ri, a renowned South Korean golfer, appeared on the show during this episode in the series debuting on May 22, 2020, further increasing the Wolf's song's exposure.

"Make You My Lady" by Jim Wolf was featured as background music in ‘돌싱글즈' 8회 (Dol Singles) Episode 8, which aired on August 29, 2021. The episode, titled "[준호수진] 키즈카페의 주인공은 나야! 준호의 재롱 타임" (“[Juno and Sujin] I’m the Star of the Kids' Café! Juno’s Playtime"), was broadcast on the South Korean MBN Network (Maeil Broadcasting Network).

"Make You My Lady" by Jim Wolf featured in the South Korean reality dating television show ‘I Am Solo’ (Korean: ‘나는 SOLO’), which airs on the SBS TV network. ‘I Am Solo’ is a popular dating series in which a group of 14 single men and women participate in the show in search of true love. The song was prominently featured during a romantic date scene on February 3, 2022, in Season 5, Episode 6 ( 5기 06회) of the series, which aired at the timestamp 57:50.

== Songs In Popular Television - Worldwide ==
One of Wolf's singles, "Just To Be With You" was licensed to the long-running daytime drama, and the highest rated soap opera, CBS’s ‘The Young and the Restless’ (Sony Pictures). The song was used as part of the storyline for Season 44 in the groundbreaking same-sex relationship when character Tessa Porter (played by Cait Fairbanks), who was an independent musician on the show, performed the song as one of her originals in (Episode 173 / Episode 11172). The character of Tessa was a fan-favorite as she was one half of the series' first same-sex couple to get married on the show, when Tessa married character Mariah Copeland (played by Camryn Grimes) in 2022.

"Just to Be With You" was licensed for another episode of CBS’s ‘The Young and the Restless’ (produced by Sony Pictures) as part of a storyline in which characters Reed Hellstrom (played by Tristan Lake Leabu) and Tessa Porter (played by Cait Fairbanks) performed the song on stage in Season 44 Episode 176 (Episode #11175).

One of the deep cuts from Wolf's emotive ‘Legacy’ album, “Living The Good Life," was featured as background music on the popular daytime soap opera CBS’s 'The Young and the Restless'. The song made its television debut on January 17, 2019, during Season 46, Episode 96 (Episode #11604).

“Door's Open(feat. Meghann Wright)” is a single from Jim Wolf's ‘Legacy’ album. The song was featured as background music on the popular CBS Sony Pictures daytime soap opera, 'The Young and the Restless'. It made its television debut in the episode titled "Season 47, Episode 124" (Episode #11894), which aired on March 12, 2020.

"Just To Be With You" (featuring Tessa Allison)” by Jim Wolf was featured in an episode of the popular CBS daytime soap opera 'The Young and the Restless'. The song appeared on September 13, 2021, during Season 48, Episode 244 (Episode #12194).

== Music In Film ==
In 2002, while attending college at Eastern Connecticut State University, Jim Wolf interned at i98 Radio WILI-FM WILI (AM) in Willimantic, Connecticut. During his internship, the station’s owner, Colin Rice, asked Wolf to create an acoustic version of the town's theme song, "Willimantic U.S.A." Wolf rearranged and recorded the song at the station, which became a regular feature on WILI A.M. Radio, airing on Wayne Norman's Morning Show. Later that year, filmmaker Josh Goldbloom found Wolf's version of the work. Goldbloom (known for be a producer the 2024 film ‘V/H/S/Beyond’, as well as other films in the V/H/S (franchise) horror anthology series, which are available on the streaming service Shudder (streaming service))featured Wolf's acoustic cover of "Willimantic U.S.A." in his documentary ‘Heroin Town’ in its most climactic scene. The film, which serves as a rebuttal to a controversial CBS’s ’60 Minutes’ segment by Dan Rather that labeled Willimantic as “Heroin Town”. The documentary originally premiered on DVD, was later broadcast on IFC (American TV channel), and is now available for streaming on Netflix. Unbeknownst to him at the time, this was Wolf's first placement in any media production.

In 2021, Wolf's song "I'm Here For You" was featured in the UK-based independent film ‘You Are My Sunshine’. The connection was made when a longtime fan of Wolf's reached out to him via Facebook, introducing him to filmmaker Dave Hastings. When an opportunity arose, Hastings felt that "I'm Here For You" would be the perfect musical accompaniment for the film's love story and included it in the ending through the credits.

== Public Speaking Appearances ==
Jim Wolf was a Special Guest and Panel Speaker at KCON 2018 in New York on June 24, 2018, on a panel titled 'The Art of K-Pop Music Design’ at the Prudential Center in New York / New Jersey. Wolf shared the panel stage with K-Pop Hit Songwriter, Andreas Oberg, and was moderated by Emma Chang (UMU of ReacttotheK).

== Awards And Recognition ==
Jim Wolf has been a finalist five different times in the International Acoustic Music Awards (I.A.M.A.), with his songs "In The Meantime”, "Many Moons”, "Save Me, Save You", "Fair-Weather Friend", and most recently "Monster In My Head" (as of 2024).

Wolf was nominated for an American Songwriting Award in the Folk music category for "Just to Be with You".

Jim Wolf's single from the album, Legacy, “Door's Open (Feat. Meghann Wright)", was picked Best of 2014 for Radio 104.1 WMRQ.

On December 16, 2014, he performed at the Finals for the Locals Live Competition at Mohegan Sun's Wolf Den in Uncasville, Connecticut.

== Partial discography ==
- Little Cash, Big Dreams (2026)
- House Of Cards (Little Cash Version) (2026)
- Door’s Open (Little Cash Version) (2026)
- End Of Our Rope (2026)
- How Did We Get Here? (2025)
- Adventures In Day Drinking (2024)
- Promises (Feat. Solrac Tracks) (2023)
- Monster In My Head (2023)
- Drunken Love (2022)
- Strange, Weird, and Romantic (Part. 3) (2021)
- I’m Here For You (2020)
- Wild Heart (2020)
- Forever Sunday (2020)
- Another Lover (2020)
- The Way Your Body Feels At Christmas (2019)
- November Rain (2019)
- Can’t Get Away From You (2019)
- Lemon Wine (2019)
- Demos From The Before Time (2018)
- Turn This World Around (2018)
- First Kiss (2018)
- Acoustic (2017)
- Strange, Weird, and Romantic (Part. 2) (2016)
- Legacy (2014)
- Strange, Weird, and Romantic (Part. 1) (2012)
- Sleeping with Strangers (2010)
