= Sam Gibson (The Young and the Restless) =

- The Young and the Restless character
- Portrayed by: Sean Patrick Flanery
- First appearance: April 18, 2011
- Last appearance: November 4, 2011
- Introduced by: Maria Arena Bell
In-universe information
- Occupation: Veterinarian

Sam Gibson is a fictional character from the American soap opera The Young and the Restless, portrayed by Sean Patrick Flanery. He made his first appearance on April 18, 2011. Introduced by head writer Maria Arena Bell, Sam was created as a love interest for Sharon Newman while she was a fugitive. A rural veterinarian, Sam takes Sharon, posing under the alias Sheri Coleman, into his barn. They eventually fall in love; but she is located and arrested. Although they remained friends, the relationship ended when she returned to Genoa City. Flanery was let go after a few months, last airing on November 4, 2011.

== Character creation and casting ==
On March 9, 2011, the show's executive producer and head writer Maria Arena Bell told TV Guide that Flanery would be joining the cast as Sam. Flanery, primarily a movie actor, is best known for his roles as Conner MacManus in The Boondock Saints, Greg Stillson in The Dead Zone, Jeremy "Powder" Reed in Powder and Indiana Jones in The Young Indiana Jones Chronicles, as well as Bobby Dagen in Saw 3D. Of working on a soap opera, Flanery said "I enjoy switching it up like that. It was a medium I had never explored before. It is a different kind of break." His full name was later announced as Sam Gibson, and his first air-date was April 18, 2011.

Prior to his debut, a TV Guide Canada columnist Nelson Branco noted in his 'Suds Report' column that Sam's characteristics and traits resembled that of another character Adam Newman's (Michael Muhney) mother Hope Adams (Signy Coleman). Adam is the song of multi-millionaire business tycoon Victor Newman (Eric Braeden), and Branco speculated in his article that Sam could possibly end up being "the real Adam Newman". This led fans to speculate about who Sam "will turn out to be".

On September 14, it was announced by various sources that Flanery along with four other cast-mates: Eden Riegel (Heather), Darius McCrary (Malcolm) and Tristan Rogers (Colin), were to leave The Young and the Restless. CBS Soaps In Depth reported that the characters were on the "shopping block" as part of a "true cast shake-up". Sara Bibel of Xfinity said "While I never take pleasure in an actor losing his or her job, these characters are not essential to the show." TV Guide Canada's Amber Dowling reported that all actors had been let go, to make way for returning and new cast members, including the highly anticipated return of Melody Thomas Scott as long-running character Nikki Newman. Dowling said "The housecleaning had many fans abuzz, wondering if it meant Scott would finally return to the series." Initially, only Rogers was expected to have been fired following an announcement via Twitter until an insider from the show shared the news with CBS Soaps In Depth of additional departures.

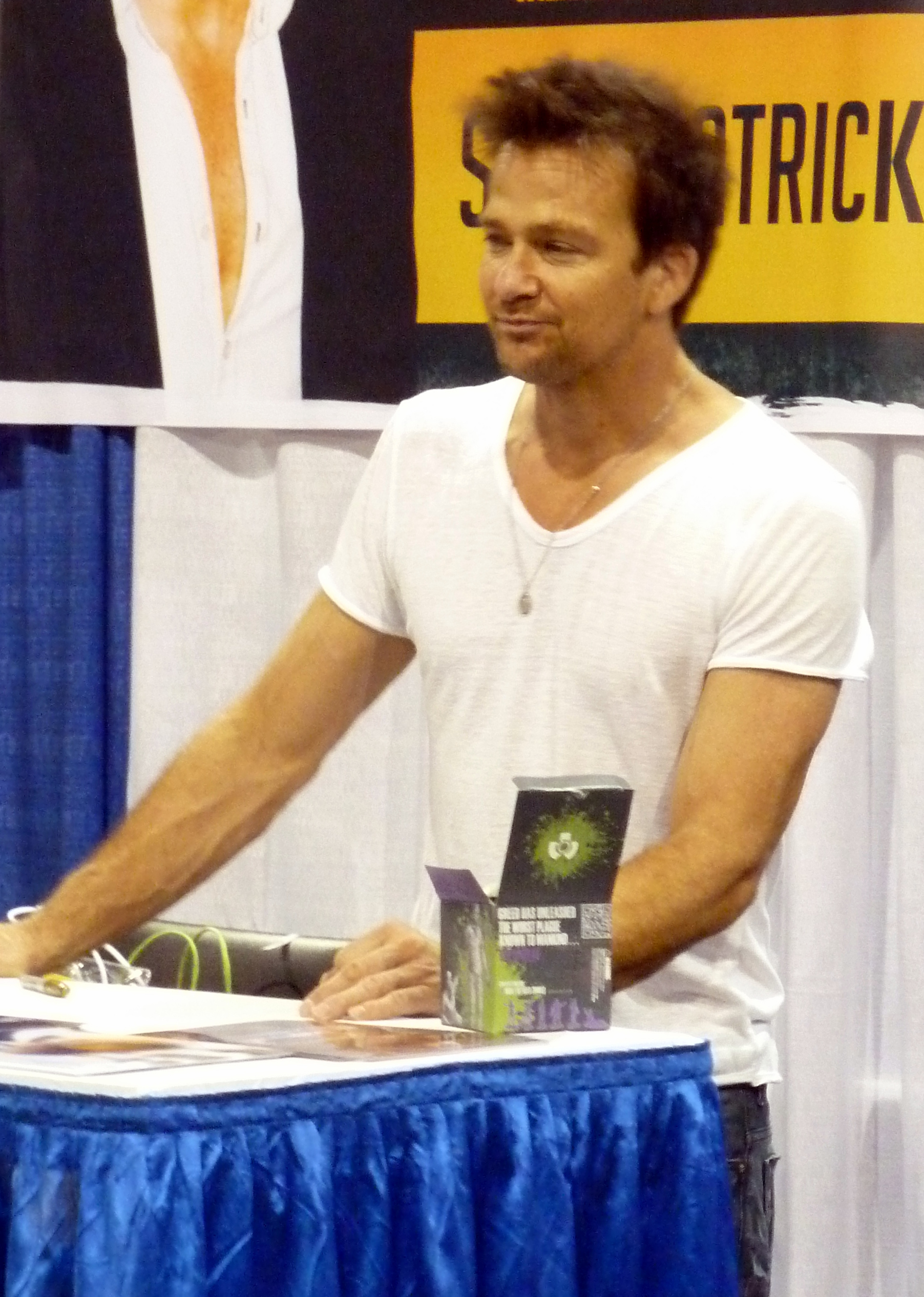
Flanery (pictured) said that Sam was a departure from the usual "filthy rich" characters.

== Development ==
Sam, a rural veterinarian from New Mexico is described as being "kind, decent, and full of common sense". The character was introduced as a love interest for Sharon Newman (Sharon Case) while she was on the run, after being sentenced un-rightfully for the murder of Skye Newman (Laura Stone). Daytime Confidential revealed that he who would enter Sharon's "orbit". On-Air On-Soaps described him as a "salt of the earth" veterinarian who would be paired with "non other" than the "troubled" Sharon, who is a regular and one of the show's longest-running cast members. TV Guide's Michael Logan noted that Flanery wouldn't end up playing "yet another rich, Genoa City power-schemer" but he would be playing "rather a salt o' the earth country veterinarian" who would romance Sharon. Flanery said that Sam "seems logical and down to earth, of average means. Sort of a departure from normal “filthy rich” characters."

Sam is a widower, and hadn't found love since the death of his wife. Sam discovered Sharon sleeping in his barn and invited her in, giving her a place to stay. At the time, Sharon, who was a fugitive, was posing under the pseudonym Sheri Coleman. Sam is good friends with a local young girl named Piper, whom 'Sheri' bonds with as well. They formed a close relationship together. While she was in New Mexico, Sharon let her loved ones in Genoa City, Wisconsin believe she was dead.

Of working with Flanery, Sharon Case said that she "loved him" and said "I thought the storyline turned out really lovely, but what a 180 degree turn in energy – that the storyline was going in one direction and all of a sudden it was going in another direction. I thought it was an interesting choice and the story turned out really beautiful." Case said that the romance between Sharon and Sam "turned out great" and praised the writing. Of the story, On-Air On-Soaps said "Sharon went on the run, faked her own death, ended up on a farm, met a handsome stranger, and from there the story seems to get even more complex."

== Storylines ==
Sam discovered 'Sheri' in his barn. She threatened him not to come close to her, but he assured her he wasn't going to hurt her. After speaking with the mysterious Sheri, he let her stay at a room attached to the barn. She helped Sam deliver a lamb, which they named Fanny. Sam told Sharon about him being a widow, and they became close. Piper Sheffield (Ellery SprayBerry), a young animal-loving local girl, met Sheri and instantly gravitated towards her. Sam provided Sheri with a laptop. Unable to check her e-mails, she decided to look at a memorial page on Faceplace which was created in honor of her, but was horrified to realize people believed she killed herself. Sam found it hard to ask Sheri to leave the barn, which she eventually agreed to. She attended a local fair with Piper and Sam, where she saw her ex, Adam Newman. Adam was in New Mexico trying to prove that Sharon's "death" was an accident, and she didn't commit suicide. In reality, Sharon was carjacked, and the women who stole her car, identification card and jewelry was killed in the car accident.

O'Keefe, Sam's beloved elderly dog, died on a night where he asked Sheri out on a date. He showed up at the barn drunk; Sheri slapped him but they ended up making love after she comforted him. The following morning, she ended up in his bed. Sheri decided to write a letter to Sam telling him the truth about her life as Sharon. However, after hours of writing, she tore up the letter. At a party Sam took Sheri to, Piper's father, a cop, arrested Sharon for the murder of Skye and fleeing Genoa City. Back in Genoa City, where Sam followed Sharon to, she explained everything. Sam wasn't angry, and decided to support Sharon. Sharon was sentenced to a thirty-year life imprisonment. Sharon told Sam, who had temporarily relocated to Genoa City to support her, to return to his life. He said goodbye to her and left. Sam returned for another visit. After Sharon was acquitted, she returned to New Mexico for a short holiday with her daughter Faith Newman (Alyvia Alyn Lind). Sam has not appeared since.

== Reception ==
Michael Logan of TV Guide called the character a "nice switch-up" from the typical character on the show. Sara Bibel of Xfinity said that Sam "seemed like a short term character" who she thought "was going to help Sharon go on a journey of self-exploration while away from Genoa City. Instead, she did not seem to learn anything from her time with the veterinarian. Once she was arrested and rejected him for another shot at Adam, I did not understand why he continued to stand by her." Following the news of Sam and three others' departures, Soaps.com held a poll entitled "Which possible departure upsets you most?", where Sam's received the most votes (1,100).
