= Grace Turner =

Fictional character from the American CBS soap opera The Young and the Restless

- The Young and the Restless character
- Jennifer Gareis as Grace Turner
- Portrayed by: Josie Davis (1996–1997); Jennifer Gareis (1997–2014)
- Duration: 1996–2000; 2002; 2004; 2014
- First appearance: June 6, 1996
- Last appearance: November 25, 2014
- Created by: William J. Bell
- Introduced by: Edward J. Scott (1996); David Shaughnessy (2002); David Shaughnessy and John F. Smith (2004); Jill Farren Phelps (2014)
In-universe information
- Occupation: Consultant for Newman Enterprises in New York City

Grace Turner is a fictional character from the CBS soap opera The Young and the Restless. Originated by actress Josie Davis, the role has been most-recognized by actress Jennifer Gareis.

== Casting ==
The role was originated by Josie Davis, who appeared from June 1996 to February 25, 1997. Jennifer Gareis then notably took over until November 22, 1999, with additional guest appearances in 2000 and 2002. Gareis then reprised her role again from January to August 13, 2004. On August 19, 2014, over a decade later, Gareis returned to the series for a guest appearance, which she was required to keep a secret. Having since joined the show's sister soap opera The Bold and the Beautiful as Donna Logan which tapes across the hall, Gareis stated, "Y&R was like my home away from home. Being able to go back to that was awesome. It was the best." Due to the positive response to her reprisal, Gareis was offered to return months later, and appeared once again on November 13, 2014. She departed on November 25 of the same year.

== Characterization ==
On-Air On-Soaps described Grace as a "sexy bad girl". The Daily Courier characterized her as "Frisky". Gareis has stated that "I love playing bad girls", explaining: "It's just so much fun because you never know what they're going to do next! They're always conniving and manipulative."

== Storylines ==
Grace was introduced as Sharon Newman's best friend, who had moved from Madison, Wisconsin, to Genoa City with her boyfriend, Tony Viscardi. Upon learning that Sharon and her husband, Nick Newman's newborn baby, Noah, was going to die, Grace and Tony decided to find Sharon's first child, a daughter she had given up at birth, to ease Sharon's pain. They finally tracked down the 5-year-old girl, Cassie, and learned her adoptive mother, Alice Johnson, had left Cassie with her adoptive Grandmother, Millie. Realizing that she was barely able to take care of herself, let alone a young child, Millie eventually let Grace and Tony take Cassie back to Genoa City with them. Noah unexpectedly survived, and Grace decided to keep Cassie's identity a secret from Nick and Sharon. Tony reluctantly agreed to help her.

Although Cassie missed Millie, she grew to think of Tony and Grace as her parents. Grace introduced Cassie to Nick and Sharon as Grace's "niece from out of town." After a year, Grace finally told Sharon the truth about Cassie's maternity. While Sharon was furious with Grace for keeping the secret, she was ecstatic to have her daughter back. Cassie, on the other hand, was devastated and angry with Sharon for giving her up at birth. Eventually, after spending time with the Newmans, Cassie came to think of Nick and Sharon as her parents.

While babysitting Cassie and Noah, Grace plotted to steal Nick from Sharon. Nick arrived home drunk. He thought that Grace was Sharon, and he had sex with her. The following morning, Nick was furious with Grace, and he swore her to secrecy. Grace blackmailed Nick into giving her a job at Newman Enterprises. She constantly tried to get Nick alone so that she could seduce him, but she didn't succeed. Grace's obsession with Nick caused Tony to leave her. One night, while on a business trip, Nick finally gave into temptation, and he slept with Grace again. The next morning, Sharon, who had come to surprise Nick, overheard Nick and Grace talking about the night before. Devastated, she wandered out onto the road, and she was hit by a car. When Sharon recovered, she and Nick reunited. After a short-lived affair with Michael Baldwin, Grace left town.

Grace briefly returned to town to visit Sharon, before returning two years later. Sharon was mortified to realize that software tycoon Cameron Kirsten was in town to make a business deal with Newman Enterprises. It was soon revealed that, during her recent absence from Genoa City, Cameron raped Sharon. When Cameron attempted to rape Sharon again, she knocked him out with a wine bottle, thinking she had killed him. After dragging the body behind a dumpster, Sharon asked Larry Warton to dispose of it for her. At a bar, Sharon ran into Grace, who told her that she had been dating Cameron, and she accused her of murdering her lover.

Sharon began having what she thought were paranoid delusions of Cameron's rotting body appearing in her living room. Desperate to find out for sure if Cameron was dead, Sharon and her mother-in-law Nikki Newman went into the sewer, where Larry had dumped the body. They found a body that was wearing Cameron's clothes, but it had decomposed beyond recognition. It was revealed later that Cameron was still alive. The "hauntings" had been a trick set up by Cameron and Grace, and the body Sharon and Nikki had found was actually that of Frank Barritt, Cassie's biological father, whom Cameron had killed himself. Nick and Sharon convinced Grace to testify against Cameron, and he was jailed for his crimes. The Newmans were grateful to Grace for saving Sharon, and Grace now works for a Newman Enterprises subsidiary in New York City.

In August 2014, Nick calls Grace and asks her to come back to Genoa City. He meets up with her in a hotel room, where Grace waits for him in her underwear, ready to seduce Nick. He tells her that he has gotten back with Sharon and isn't there for a booty call. Nick wants Grace to help him. He tells her about Cassie's look-alike Mariah Copeland. She was hired by Nick's father Victor Newman to drive Sharon insane. After the plan failed, Sharon took Mariah in. However Nick is questioning Mariah's past. He asks Grace if she can remember Cassie's birth. Grace opens up about the day, telling Nick that she and Sharon's mother Doris were with Sharon in the hospital. While neither of them got to witness Cassie's birth, Grace remembers a nurse named Helen - Mariah's mother. Nick thanks Grace for her help. Grace returns to Genoa City again, this time in November 2014, arriving at Sharon's doorstep to see Mariah for herself; the pair exchange conversation, with Grace admitting she attempted to seduce Nick the last time she was in town months earlier. Infuriated, Sharon throws Grace out, with Grace remarking how she cannot wait to see how things turn out for Sharon and Nick.

== Reception ==
Candace Young from Soaps She Knows called Grace "Seductive", a "Trouble-Maker" and a "bad girl" who "had her eye on her best friend's man."
