= Cassie Newman =

Fictional character from the American soap opera The Young and the Restless

- The Young and the Restless character
- Portrayed by: Camryn Grimes
- Duration: 1997–2007; 2009–2010; 2013–2014; 2020–2021; 2024; 2026
- First appearance: March 19, 1997
- Last appearance: August 10, 2026
- Created by: William J. Bell
- Introduced by: Edward J. Scott (1997); John F. Smith (2005–2006); Lynn Marie Latham and Josh Griffith (2007); Maria Arena Bell and Paul Rauch (2009–2010); Jill Farren Phelps (2013); Anthony Morina and Josh Griffith (2020); Josh Griffith (2024); Sally McDonald (2026)
In-universe information
- Other names: Cassidy Ann Newman; Cassidy Ann Johnson; Cassie Johnson; Cassidy Johnson
- Family: Newman
- Father: Frank Barritt
- Mother: Sharon Newman
- Adoptive father: Nicholas Newman
- Adoptive mother: Alice Johnson (former)
- Sisters: Mariah Copeland
- Half-brothers: Noah Newman; Christian Newman (adoptive)(legal)
- Half-sisters: Summer Newman (adoptive); Faith Newman
- Grandfathers: Victor Newman (adoptive)
- Grandmothers: Doris Collins; Nikki Newman (adoptive); Millie Johnson (former adoptive)
- Uncles: Dylan McAvoy (adoptive); John Abbott III (adoptive); Adam Newman (adoptive)
- Aunts: Victoria Newman (adoptive); Abby Newman (adoptive)
- Nephews: Harrison Abbott (adoptive)
- Nieces: Aria Porter-Copeland (adoptive)
- First cousins: Eve Nicole Howard (adoptive); Reed Hellstrom (adoptive); Johnny Abbott (adoptive); Connor Newman (adoptive); Katie Newman (adoptive); Christian Newman (adoptive); Dominic Abbott Newman Chancellor (adoptive)

Cassie Newman is a fictional character from The Young and the Restless, an American soap opera on the CBS network. Portrayed by Camryn Grimes, the character was introduced on March 19, 1997, by William J. Bell as the biological daughter of Sharon Newman (Sharon Case) who had been adopted. Grace Turner (Jennifer Gareis), Sharon's best friend, tracked Cassie down in hopes of reuniting her with Sharon, but decided to keep the girl for herself. A year passed before Sharon learned Cassie was her daughter, regaining custody with her husband Nicholas Newman (Joshua Morrow), who adopted her.

In 2005, the producers decided to kill off Cassie by having her die from injuries sustained in a car accident, the episode aired on May 24, 2005. The character's death was felt in storyline for years to follow, leading to the dissolution of her parents' marriage and numerous events thereafter. Grimes continued to recur following her character's death, usually in flashbacks, dreams or as a hallucination to the mentally ill; these returns aired from June 7, 2005, until June 14, 2007, and again on May 6, 2009, and March 15, 2010. Grimes' final return as a hallucination was over the course of July 8, 2013, to October 30, 2014, during which the actress would return to The Young and the Restless as a main cast member, as Cassie's previously unknown twin sister, Mariah Copeland. In January 2020, it was reported that Grimes would be reprising the role of Cassie, appearing on February 7. She then made another one-off appearance on December 24, 2021.

Both the actress and character were well received by fans and enjoyed critical acclaim, with Grimes becoming the youngest recipient of the Daytime Emmy Award for Outstanding Younger Actress in a Drama Series in 2000, at age 10.

== Character development ==
When she debuted, Cassie was 6 years old, having been born on January 8, 1991. She was adopted by Alice Johnson (Tamara Clatterbuck) as an infant. However, in 1994, Alice disappeared and left her in the care of her elderly mother Millie. Sharon's best friend Grace Turner (Jennifer Gareis) later tracked down Cassie and took her for herself. The Pittsburgh Post-Gazette said that Grace wanted Cassie as a "pet" despite knowing Sharon was her biological mother. As she grew up, she went from a sweet child to a "rebellious" teen who began to lie to her parents. She also wanted to hang out with older kids at school, like Daniel Romalotti (Michael Graziadei) and Lily Winters (Christel Khalil). She was grounded because of her "rebellious streak". Cassie was described as a "good girl" who wanted to "fit in" but began cutting classes, giving her parents attitude and "a whole host of other angsty teenage pleasantries."

Cassie died following a car crash on the episode that aired May 24, 2005. Grimes said that she has missed the show since leaving, and was shocked to find out that Cassie was killed off. She stated: "If it's meant to happen, it's meant to happen. Everything happens for a reason, I think." Of Cassie's last scene, she said it was "ridiculously hard [...] If you watch my death scene, where Sharon is crying over me - I'm supposed to be dead - but I'm crying." If Cassie wasn't killed off, Grimes wanted her to have a love interest, stating: "I always wanted a love interest. If I'd stayed on the show, I had hoped that was where it would go eventually.

Liberty Kontranowski of About.com labeled Cassie's death as one of the "saddest and hardest-hitting storylines" of daytime. After her death, her parents began 'Cassie's Foundation', a movement "to prevent teenage drinking and driving."

== Storylines ==
Cassie was born in 1991, when her then sixteen-year-old mother Sharon Collins (Sharon Case) was pressured to sleep with her high school boyfriend, Frank Barritt (Phil Dozois), which she did. Sharon gave the child up for adoption, as she and her mother were financially struggling, and Frank wanted nothing to do with the child. Three years later, in 1994, Sharon moves to Genoa City, where she meets and eventually marries Nicholas Newman (Joshua Morrow), son of wealthy business tycoon Victor Newman (Eric Braeden).

In 1997, Sharon and Nick's newborn son, Noah Newman (Rory Gibson) becomes ill and it is believed that he may die. As a result, Sharon's best friend Grace Turner (Josie Davis, replaced mid-storyline by Jennifer Gareis) tracks down the baby Sharon gave up for adoption, Cassie, who had been adopted by a woman named Alice Johnson (Tamara Clatterbuck). However, Alice abandoned Cassie, and her frail, elderly mother Millie ended up caring for her. Millie reluctantly allows Grace to bring Cassie to Genoa City. When Noah survives, Grace decides to keep Cassie, wanting to raise the six-year-old with her boyfriend Tony Viscardi (Nick Scotti). Sharon meets Cassie, unaware that she is her daughter. A year later, Sharon learns the truth about Cassie being her daughter. In the process, Grace attempted to run away with Cassie, but her plans are foiled. Cassie is soon adopted by Sharon and Nick. At age eleven, Cassie almost drowns in a frozen pond.

In 2003, Frank Barritt shows up in town, surprising Sharon and Cassie at Fenmore's Boutique, without divulging to Cassie who he is. Cassie and Frank share another encounter at Crimson Lights. Frank, having read about her near-death in the pond, wants to form a relationship with his daughter. Nick warns Frank to stay away, and Sharon simply tells Cassie that Frank is someone from her past. Later, Cameron Kirsten (Linden Ashby) murders Frank and frames Sharon. At the time of his death, Frank had plans to look into his parental rights with Cassie. Nick and Sharon tell Cassie that Frank was her father, and the prospect of never knowing her biological father devastates her.

In 2005, Cassie turns fourteen and yearns to be a part of the "popular kids" clique at school. She develops a crush on Daniel Romalotti (Michael Graziadei), who is two years older than her, and socializes with the older teens: Daniel, Lily Winters (Christel Khalil), Colleen Carlton (Lyndsy Fonseca), Devon Hamilton (Bryton James), and Sierra Hoffman (Asia Ray Smith). The five of them laugh behind Cassie's back at her attempts to act mature around them. Cassie begins rebelling, skipping classes and being rude to her parents. One night, Cassie attends a party, despite telling her parents that she was going to see a movie. At the party, she finds a drunken Daniel passed out, and decides to drive him home to the Newman ranch, where he lives with his mother Phyllis Summers (Michelle Stafford). Cassie, who is under-age and without a license, crashes the car, injuring herself significantly, and Daniel to a lesser extent. Daniel and Cassie are both rushed to the hospital with no memories of the crash, and it is believed that Daniel drove while intoxicated. A severely injured Cassie remembers that she was driving, and staggers out of the hospital to find Daniel and tell him. Nick finds her at Crimson Lights where she collapses, and dies hours later at the hospital with Nick and Sharon by her side; she manages to tell Nick part of the truth, and promises her parents that they will have another daughter. Nine months after Cassie's death, with Sharon spending more and more time with work and Brad Carlton, Nick cheats on Sharon with Phyllis, resulting in the birth of a daughter, Summer Newman (Hunter King), which ends his marriage to Sharon.

After her death, Cassie appears on multiple occasions to both Nick and Sharon as a spirit or in a dream. In 2009, she visits Sharon in a dream, while she is pregnant with Nick's child. Sharon gives birth to a daughter, Faith Newman (Alyvia Alyn Lind), who is stolen at birth by Adam Newman (Michael Muhney), and it is believed for six months that she was stillborn. Nick and Sharon are reunited with Faith in 2010. Before this, Cassie visits Sharon and assures her that she will be reunited with her daughter. In 2013, Cassie made various appearances as an apparition to Sharon while she was off her bipolar disorder meds, and had altered DNA test results between Nick and Summer in order to get closer to Nick. Cassie continued appearing in dreams and visions to Sharon throughout 2014.

== Reception ==
She was awarded the Daytime Emmy Award for Outstanding Younger Actress in a Drama Series in 2000 for her portrayal of Cassie, becoming the youngest winner to receive the award, at age 10, beating Kimberly McCullough, who won at age 11. Grimes was credited in 2009 as the medium's most talented younger actress right up until the end, and her character's death is named #41 in the list of The 100 Most Memorable Moments in Soap History, both recognitions by Soaps Hunks.

After Cassie was killed off, fans were upset. According to Akron Beacon Journal, some fans were "depressed" and angry that Cassie was killed off. They also hoped that she could possibly be "brought back to life" like the character of Taylor Forrester (Hunter Tylo) on the show's sister-soap, The Bold and the Beautiful. Liberty Kontranowski of About.com praised the character, stating "Cassie was a great character, brilliantly played by the Emmy-winning Camryn Grimes. It was devastating to see her go, but it was a story that will continue to impact the members of Genoa City for years to come."
