= Sharon Newman =

- The Young and the Restless character
- Sharon Case as Sharon Newman
- Portrayed by: Monica Potter (1994); Heidi Mark (1994); Sharon Case (1994–present)
- Duration: 1994–present
- First appearance: June 27, 1994
- Created by: William J. Bell
- Introduced by: William J. Bell and Edward J. Scott
In-universe information
- Other names: Sharon Collins; Sharon Abbott; Sharon McAvoy; Sheri Coleman; Sharon Rosales
- Occupation: Businesswoman; Cosmetics spokeswoman; Barista; Model; Coffeehouse owner; Victim liaison; Psychologist
- Family: Newman
- Mother: Doris Collins
- Spouse: Nicholas Newman (1995–2007) (Note: Nicholas and Sharon were married first in 1995, although the marriage was invalid. They were married again from 1996 to 2006, though their divorce was finalized a year later in 2007.); Jack Abbott (2007–09); Adam Newman (2009–2010); Victor Newman (2012) (Note: Victor and Sharon were married twice in 2012. From January 13–30, 2012, and again from August 2 – October 8, 2012. Both marriages were annulled.); Dylan McAvoy (2015–2017); Rey Rosales (2020–2022)
- Sons: Noah Newman
- Daughters: Cassie Newman; Mariah Copeland; Faith Newman
- Granddaughters: Aria Porter-Copeland (adoptive)

Sharon Newman is a fictional character from The Young and the Restless, an American soap opera on the CBS network, currently portrayed by Sharon Case. Created by William J. Bell as a love interest for Nicholas Newman, the character debuted on June 27, 1994. Before Case took over in September 1994, the character was portrayed briefly by Monica Potter and then by Heidi Mark. When introduced, Sharon was a young girl from the poor side of town; her early storylines included being raped by Matt Clark and the revelation that she had given up a child for adoption. Nick and Sharon married, had a son named Noah, and later won custody of Cassie, the daughter she had as a teenager. Their marriage faced a number of problems, including infidelity on both sides. Following Cassie's death in an automobile accident, Nick cheated on Sharon with Phyllis Summers, resulting in a pregnancy which ended their 11-year marriage.

Despite her second marriage to Jack Abbott, Nick and Sharon had an affair and conceived another child: Faith. During the pregnancy, Sharon experienced kleptomania. Faith was kidnapped by Adam Newman, Nick's half-brother, who married Sharon after leading her to believe Faith had died. When Adam's crimes were revealed, Sharon remained in love with him; SoapNet considered the relationship "dark". Since 2009, former showrunner Maria Arena Bell and subsequent head writers that followed have significantly changed the character's direction, receiving negative backlash from critics and audiences. In 2012, Sharon controversially marries her former father-in-law Victor Newman twice, gains control of his company and burns down his ranch — a sequence of events which resulted in her being diagnosed with bipolar disorder. Sharon then altered DNA test results to make Nick believe his daughter Summer was fathered by Jack. Her subsequent storylines have included being reunited with her other daughter (and Cassie's twin) Mariah Copeland; marrying Nick's other half-brother Dylan McAvoy; experiencing a phantom pregnancy after miscarrying their child, which led her to keep a child that wasn't hers for months; and battling breast cancer before marrying Rey Rosales.

Sharon has been characterized as "insecure" and "a survivor" by Case, who recognized the character's history of "weird" behavior prior to her bipolar diagnosis. Despite her crimes and faults, Sharon is described as an "ever-suffering heroine" by Canyon News, and has been called soap opera's "hottest mess" by Daytime Confidential. The supercouple pairing of Nick and Sharon attracted a large fan following. Case has become popular with viewers and her performance has received praise from critics (particularly for overcoming heavily panned writing), while also earning her several award nominations, including winning a Daytime Emmy Award for Outstanding Supporting Actress in a Drama Series in 1999.

== Development ==
=== Casting ===
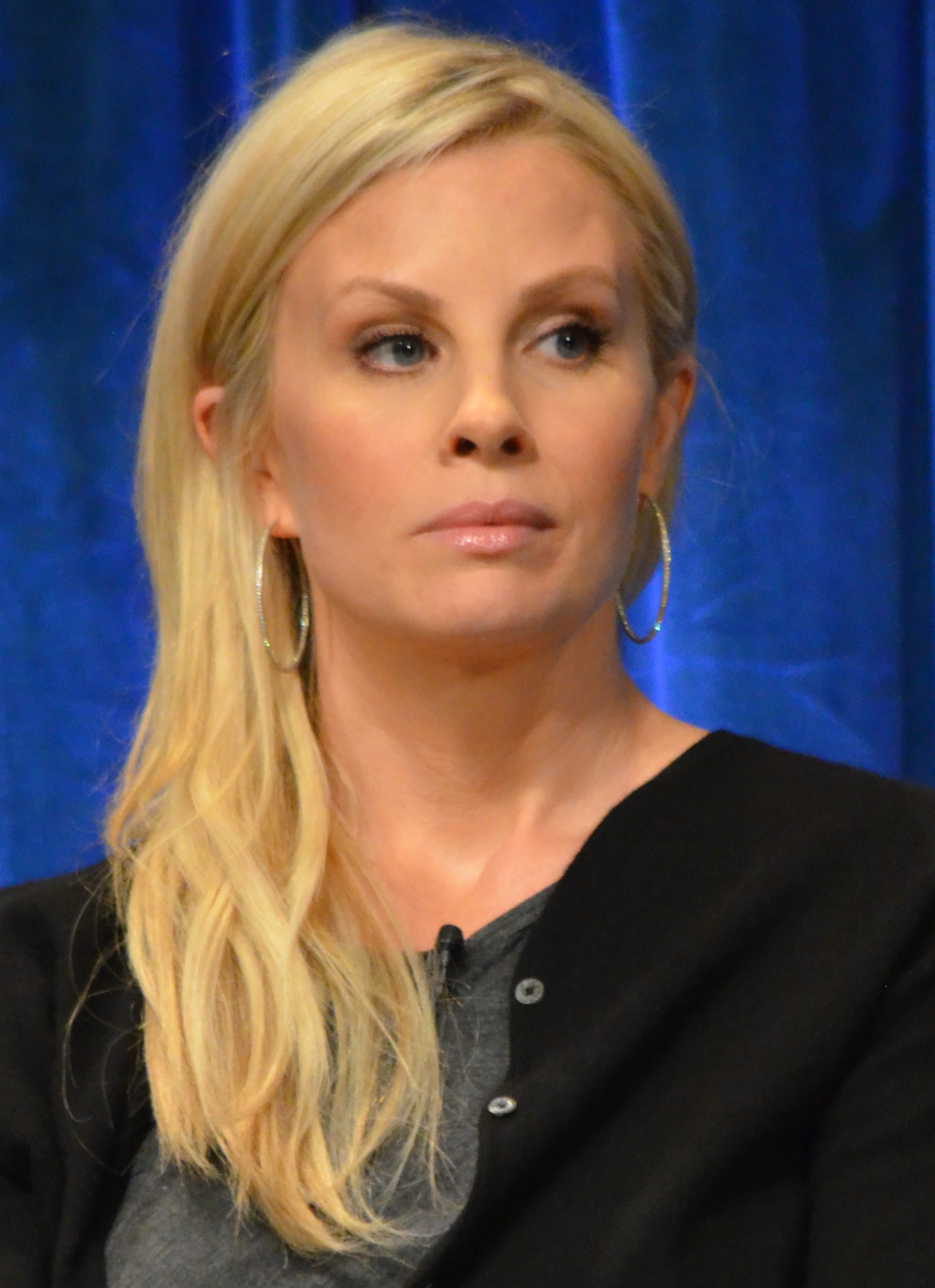
Monica Potter originated the role of Sharon, although she was fired afterward.

Sharon Newman was created and introduced by William J. Bell, with the character making her first appearance June 27, 1994. Sharon Case, who plays Sharon to the present day, is the third actress to play the role. Previously, struggling actress Monica Potter originated the role, but was fired. She confessed years later, "I was fired because I was terrible". Heidi Mark then briefly took over the role on July 11, 1994; Potter and Mark together had a three–month stint.

Case, who had previously worked on the soap operas General Hospital and As the World Turns, was chosen as Mark's replacement after a casting search. She was selected from a group of six other possible recasts after a screen testing with co-star Joshua Morrow, and began airing on September 7, 1994. Initially, Case believed she would only be playing the role for a maximum of six months. Of her casting, she stated: "Not only is this my third soap, but I'm also the third actress to play the role of Sharon Collins. So, if three times is the charm, this should be it." The actress wanted to "breathe new life" into the role and make it her own. In 2003, Case was off-screen from February 17 to May 1, during contract negotiations. These were resolved that April, when she signed a new contract to remain on the show for another four years, until 2007. Case revealed that while she considered leaving the series, "I would not have been negotiating if I did not want to come back. I've always had a great story to play. I love the way they write Sharon. It was just a matter of hammering out the deal points."

=== Characterization ===
Known for her long-term suffering, Sharon is first introduced as a "troubled teen" and "the girl from the wrong side of the tracks". In 1995, Case observed that despite being raped and caring for her disabled mother, Sharon would "not let herself be a victim". Nekeeta Borden of the website Daytime Confidential described the character as being a kindhearted "shero" during her early years on the show, noting that she wanted to start her own trends rather than follow other members of the Newman family. However, Case compared Sharon to a younger Jill Foster Abbott (Jess Walton), telling Soap Opera Weekly that Jill "was kind of like Sharon. She was nice...no one thought she was a gold digger—at first."

According to the actress, Sharon does "weird things" and panics when stressed, and her mistakes "eat away at her". Case recognized that Sharon has "always been kind of off" and "experienced these weird jags", which would eventually be addressed by the character's bipolar disorder diagnosis. Case also described Sharon as being insecure and feeling unworthy of being in a happy relationship, and would later criticize the writers for pairing Sharon with "too many men" because it "waters her down". The character often sees visions of her deceased daughter Cassie (Camryn Grimes), with Case stating that Sharon believes "she is connected to the spiritual world".

Having played many facets of Sharon over the years, Case said: "It’s almost like I’ve played 15 different characters in my career when I’ve only played one. There’s never a dull moment", calling the character an "optimist and a survivor". Case has stated that the character's main drive is searching for love, which to Sharon is "her survival". She described Sharon as having "so many different layers to her" and one of the more complex characters on The Young and the Restless. The actress further opined that Sharon was initially a damsel in distress and "wasn't very colorful", which is why the writers chose to have her do "bad things" over the years. Former head writer Charles Pratt, Jr. likened Sharon's story to The Perils of Pauline (1914).

=== Relationship with Nicholas Newman ===
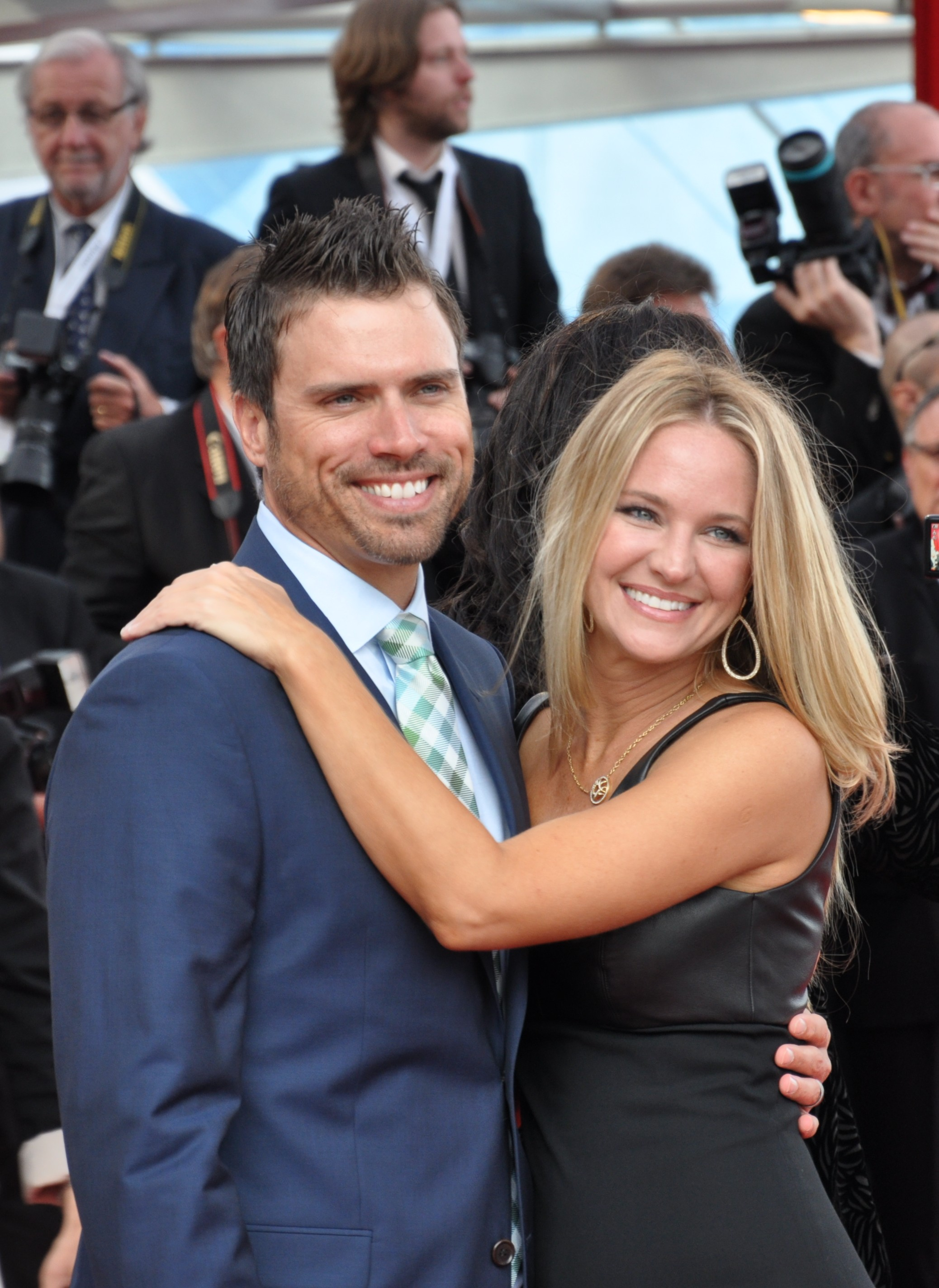
Case (right) with co-star Joshua Morrow (left), who portrays Nicholas Newman.

Since her debut on the series, Sharon has had an on-again, off-again relationship with her high-school sweetheart, Nicholas "Nick" Newman (Joshua Morrow). As teenagers they dream of eloping, and face their first hurdle when Sharon's ex-boyfriend Matt Clark (Eddie Cibrian) exposes Sharon's teenage motherhood. Nick, who believed Sharon was a virgin, briefly breaks up with her but they reunite. With Matt behind them, they marry in February 1996 and have their first child—Noah (Robert Adamson)—in 1997, the year Sharon is also reunited with her daughter Cassie (Camryn Grimes). Nick and Sharon split up when he is seduced by her best friend Grace Turner (Jennifer Gareis), but are later reunited during a custody battle for Cassie. Of their highly anticipated reunion, head writer Kay Alden noted that after months of "mixed messages", the couple's feelings were definitely clear again. After 14-year-old Cassie is killed in a car accident, Nick becomes distant from Sharon, and cheats on her with Phyllis Summers (Michelle Stafford). The marriage ends when Phyllis becomes pregnant and later gives birth to their daughter, Summer Newman (Hunter King). Case said that Sharon saw Phyllis as a "poison" in their lives, noting: "Sharon is a religious person, and that was the devil’s work."

Although Sharon also moved on, marrying Jack Abbott (Peter Bergman), Nick and Sharon remain in love. Phyllis grows resentful of Sharon's presence in her marriage, insulting her in an article in her magazine Restless Style. Nick and Sharon eventually reunite in a sexual affair at the Abbott cabin, an event much anticipated by viewers. According to Case, Sharon wanted Nick more than anyone at the time but only if he left Phyllis; Morrow noted that although the reunion was "messy", viewers wanted this for a long time. Another one-night stand with Nick results in Sharon becoming pregnant, and she later gives birth to their daughter, Faith. Nick and Sharon are briefly engaged, but break up again when she sleeps with his brother (and Faith's kidnapper) Adam, and their relationship becomes bitter.

Although Case and Morrow believe the couple belong together, they are apart for several years; during which they both believed a reunion wouldn't happen anytime soon. In late 2013, the couple begin to reconnect romantically despite Sharon having secretly switched the paternity test results of Nick's daughter Summer; Case stated in an interview that Sharon is in "constant turmoil" regarding her secret, and Morrow stated that he believed a reunion was a possibility given Nick's vulnerability. Given Sharon's secret, Soaps In Depth wrote that "the supercouple's fans may need a holiday miracle" to keep the couple's relationship from "exploding".

=== Cameron Kirsten ===
Sharon looks at the body of Frank Barritt in disbelief, believing it to be Cameron Kirsten (2004).

"You have to have people doing bad things or what type of story are you going to have?"

— Case, on the storyline (2004)

In February 2003, Case temporarily exited the show as a result of lengthy contract negotiations. Instead of having the character depart permanently (or be killed off), executive producer David Shaughnessy chose to have her leave town after issues with her marriage to Nick. While away, Sharon becomes suicidal; Case explained that Sharon's life had fallen apart and she left town to commit suicide, drinking herself into "a complete stupor". Travelling to Denver, she meets (and has an affair with) businessman Cameron Kirsten (Linden Ashby), who physically abuses her. In April, Case signed a new contract with the show. Executive producer and head writer at the time John F. Smith said that upon Sharon's return to Genoa City, she wants to keep where she was a secret. That December, Sharon is horrified when Cameron arrives in town for apparent business with Newman Enterprises. Smith stated that the story with Cameron and Sharon would be one that "builds quickly into a lot of drama". Explaining their relationship, Ashby revealed that Cameron and Sharon were "kindred spirits" and hooked up, but Cameron becomes abusive, with Ashby calling him "really disturbing". Cameron blackmails Sharon into meeting him at a motel. When she arrives they have a physical altercation in which Sharon throws a bottle at him to keep him from raping her, "killing" him (or so she believes). Australian magazine TV Soap noted that "sweet, demure" Sharon had become a murderer. After driving around with his body in her car trunk for days, she dumps it in an alley. Sharon's former friend, Grace, returns to town; she discovers Cameron alive, and nurses him back to health. Detective Weber (Sherman Augustus) is suspicious of Sharon's involvement in Cameron's disappearance. Sharon begins "hallucinating" with visions of Cameron's "ghost" (which is actually him, alive). Case noted that Sharon was getting into deeper trouble by making mistakes "trying to do the right thing".

A scene where Sharon and Nick's mother Nikki (Melody Thomas Scott) were searching the sewers for what they believed was Cameron's dead body became popular with fans of the show. Scott described the sewer shoot as a "horrific day at work" with "20 live f--king rats on the set", while comparing the unlikely duo of Sharon and Nikki to Lucy and Ethel from I Love Lucy. Cameron eventually reveals himself. He had murdered Sharon's ex-boyfriend (and Cassie's biological father) Frank Barritt (Phil Dozois), who was visiting town, and hid the body in Sharon's car trunk. Cameron's crimes are revealed; he is jailed, absolving Sharon of wrongdoing. Although Sharon did not actually murder Cameron, Case praised the storyline and called Sharon a heroine. She explained: "Your romantic lead shouldn't just be a simple romantic lead. Sharon was that for a long time. She was in this love story with Nick and nothing really happened to her. You can only carry that so far."

=== Cassie's death ===
In 2005, good-girl Cassie becomes a rebellious teenager; Nick and Sharon have a difficult time dealing with her. Cassie has a crush on bad-boy Daniel Romalotti (Michael Graziadei), who is dating Lily Winters (Christel Khalil). One night, against her parents' wishes she sneaks out to a party. In a ploy to impress a drunken Daniel she attempts to drive him home, despite being underage. The car crashes, leaving them with no memory of the accident. Daniel is thought to have been driving, and is blamed for the accident. Cassie becomes hospitalized and escapes to find Daniel to tell him she was driving, but is soon re-admitted. During the May 24 episode, Cassie dies with Nick and Sharon at her side. Grimes said she did not think Cassie would die, but if it was "meant to happen, it's meant to happen". The actress found filming her last scenes with Case and Morrow "ridiculously hard". Case also found taping the scenes devastating: "It was too real for Joshua and me to even go through it. We did it in one take. The scene is still devastating in my mind and Joshua's. It's almost not watchable. If it comes on, I can't get through it."

Daniel is cleared of all charges and Nick and Sharon begin Cassie's Foundation, a movement to prevent teenage drinking and driving. According to Case, when Sharon loses something in her life it "reminds her and reactivates Cassie’s death for her". After Nick cheats on Sharon following Cassie's death, Case said it "makes you so fearful that you are going to be alone for the rest of your life; that no matter what you go out in life to create, it’s going to be ruined anyway". The actress also believed that Sharon lost her identity after Cassie's death. In 2012, during a court battle over Newman Enterprises (the family company), Nick stated that Sharon's mental problems date to Cassie's death.

=== Subsequent relationships ===
According to Case, Sharon loses her identity after her divorce from Nick, which leads to her beginning a romance with Phyllis's ex-husband Jack Abbott, played by Peter Bergman. They marry in April 2007, but divorce two years later as a result of Jack's dishonesty which severely weakened the marriage. Case praised the pairing for its accurate representation of a "modern marriage" and noted that Sharon could not deal with Jack's "broken promises again and again". Years before marrying Jack, Sharon had a brief affair with Brad Carlton (Don Diamont). Case believed that the romance could have been further explored. During a blizzard, Brad visits Sharon at the Abbott cabin and declares his love for her, although she rejects him. Moments later, Brad is killed while saving her son, Noah, from drowning in an icy lake; he falls through the ice himself. Case stated that Sharon was guilty over Brad's tragic death.

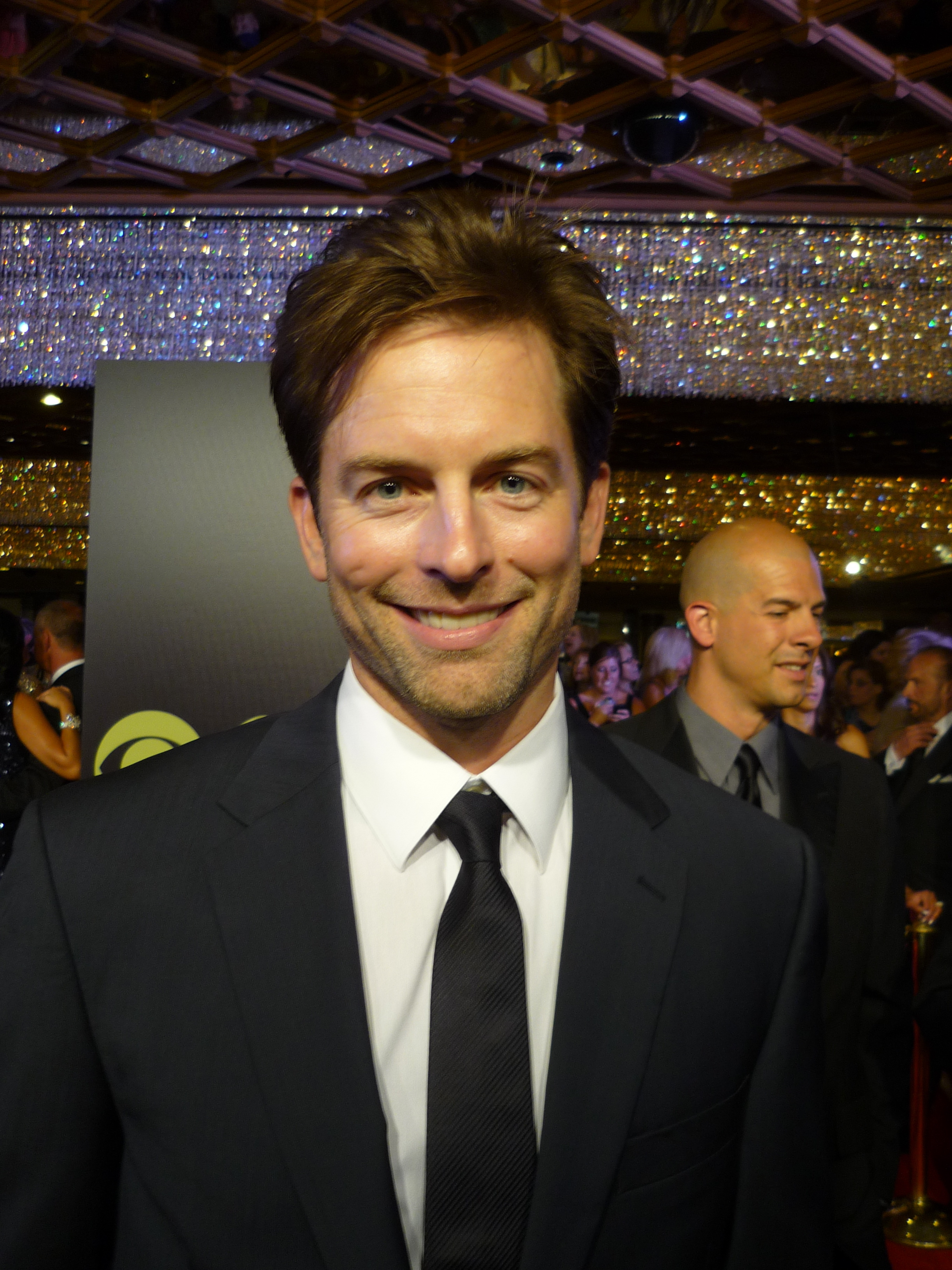
Michael Muhney plays Sharon's "darker" love interest, Adam.

After kidnapping her newborn daughter Faith, Adam Newman (Michael Muhney) bonds with Sharon out of guilt, which results in the two getting married. Despite his actions, Muhney stated that Adam "unequivocally" loves Sharon. After Adam's kidnapping of Faith is revealed, Sharon remains in love with him, angering her family and friends. Case described Sharon's ability to forgive Adam as "a tough pill to swallow", while Jamey Giddens of Daytime Confidential described them as "inappropriate, yet red-hot". After trying to get Adam acquitted for Skye's (his ex-wife's) murder, Sharon is jailed. Case liked "Shadam", noting that the relationship "took us all by surprise...that is what I was referring to with this storyline because of the pace and the vitality that 'Shadam' has." While a fugitive, Adam believes Sharon is dead; however, she sleeps with Sam Gibson (Sean Patrick Flanery). Adam feels betrayed when Sharon returns to Genoa City; he cons her into a jailhouse wedding, and leaves her heartbroken and angry.

To spend time with Faith, Nick forces Sharon to get a restraining order against Adam. The night before the order becomes active, Adam and Sharon make love. Jae' Jones of Yahoo! noted that Sharon's actions would always lead her back to Adam. After Adam is attacked (losing his vision), Sharon brings him back to his mother's farm in Kansas and they become engaged. However, she breaks up with Adam again when his additional past crimes come to light. After marrying Chelsea Lawson (Melissa Claire Egan), Adam helps Sharon through an emotional breakdown (which drove her to burn down Victor's home) and covers her tracks so she is not arrested. Sharon and Adam's attraction drove a wedge between him and Chelsea. Luke Kerr of Daytime Confidential considered Chelsea "out of her league" against Sharon. While Case felt that Nick and Sharon's history "held more weight", she said Sharon's relationship with Adam is "just as deep".

Unlike Nick's mother Nikki Newman (Melody Thomas Scott), his father Victor Newman (Eric Braeden) adored Sharon and maintained a paternal relationship with her over the years. Case described Victor as being Sharon's hero and a "father figure". However, their dynamic changes in January 2012 when Victor marries Sharon so that she can protect his assets while he is in jail; the non-romantic marriage is annulled days later. Several months later, they become romantically involved. Joshua Morrow told Soaps In Depth that he was puzzled as to why Nick had no "legitimate anger" about the relationship, while Braeden was also unhappy with the storyline, stating: "We all have gone through periods of playing something we didn't really like to play so much, but you do it." Case described the relationship as incestuous: "Sometimes controversial storylines can work because you're bringing attention to a controversial issue that the nation is trying to decide on. But this was not one of those things", calling it "upsetting to the audience". The actress was also unfavorable of Sharon marrying Victor in August 2012, believing the writers could have handled the storyline other ways. The short-lived marriage between Victor and Sharon was considered an "inside joke" for the actors. Reflecting on the storyline, Case admitted: "I didn’t understand how I was going to sell a love story between Sharon and Victor for obvious reasons. What motivated Sharon to fall in love with Victor when she’s in love with Adam and Nick?"

=== Imprisonment and escape ===
Sharon posing as her alias, Sheri Coleman, on a farm in New Mexico.

In January 2011, Sharon is arrested for the murder of Adam's ex-wife, Skye Newman (Laura Stone), and sinks into a state of depression. She had previously traveled to Hawaii to find Skye, who fell into an active volcano. CBS Soaps In Depth reported that a distraught Sharon might commit suicide. After she is sentenced to life in prison Sharon claims she is ill, going to a bathroom where Adam hid a duffel bag for her escape. She overcomes an officer with chloroform, and escapes through a window. Adam has given her a false identification, a passport and cash. She stops at a gas station, where she dyes her hair brunette and changes into a revealing outfit. Case said that although the storyline was fun, she disliked being a brunette. Later, Sharon is carjacked and her possessions stolen; the female carjacker dies after the car crashes. The body is identified as Sharon's, leaving her family and friends believing she died. Case, who wanted to do a Mr. & Mrs. Smith-type storyline, said that she had her chance when Sharon became a fugitive. The actress enjoyed playing the "aggressive" side of Sharon when she attacked the prison guard.

After escaping from Genoa City, Sharon then lives under the pseudonym of Sheri Coleman for several months in New Mexico. While there she seduces Sam Gibson (Sean Patrick Flanery), who lets her stay at his farm; she bonds with the barn animals and a young local girl named Piper. Case said that although she hoped the "recklessness" of her character would continue, she found Sharon's storyline with Sam, Piper and the animals "really beautiful". Case hoped the story would take a different route, where she could meet Adam on the run and create a Bonnie and Clyde scenario.

Head writer Maria Arena Bell dedicated the 4th of July episode to Sharon, stating that the episode would "shed more light on Sharon and all the factors that caused her to be in this situation, why she's acted the way she has and why she's gone into the pit of [low] self-esteem." Case noted that she wanted to show viewers why Sharon is in the place she's in, as well as examine her life over the years during the episode. Jae' Jones of Yahoo! analyzed the storyline in anticipation of Sharon's homecoming, hoping that Nick, Adam and Noah would not forgive her because of all the "unforgivable things" she has done (especially her devious move of letting them believe she was dead). Jones further said: "Some will say she did what she thought she had to do. Even though it seemed as if it was easy, it's never that easy to walk away from the people you love".

In July 2011, Sharon is arrested in New Mexico, and returned to Genoa City to serve her life sentence. Case said that although she was happy to be at the barn because it was "relaxing", she became restless as an actor and was glad her character was returning home. Sharon's actions do have repercussions: Nick is immensely angry with her, and Adam dumps her for sleeping with Sam. In November 2011 (almost a year after the accident at the volcano), evidence of Sharon's innocence surfaces and she is acquitted.

=== Mental illness and personality change ===
In 2009, Sharon has kleptomania (an impulse-control disorder), causing her to steal items from people and stores. As a result, she is forced to admit herself into a psychiatric hospital while pregnant. While she believed Sharon's "craziness" made sense, Case also welcomed the challenge in deciding how functional the character appears to viewers, and got into debates with directors. Michael Fairman noted that Sharon is "acting so bizarre". Case attributed Sharon's breakdown to Brad Carlton's death and the failure of her marriage to Jack, explaining that each time Sharon mapped out her life, it is "torn to pieces". Sharon continues to experience recurrent kleptomania in subsequent years.

In 2012, after Victor disappears following his wedding to Sharon, she realizes she must be married to Victor for more than eight days to obtain his money. She then burns their prenuptial agreement after Nikki sends her a text from Victor's phone saying he has left her. Sharon decides to run his company (Newman Enterprises) in his absence. Case thought a scene where Sharon crashed a Newman board meeting was fun and different, confessing that she had wanted to play "this version of Sharon for years". As Victor's proxy she became CEO of the company, secretly aided by manipulative businessman Tucker McCall (Stephen Nichols). The stock price for the company drops (with Tucker secretly buying stock), and Sharon is labelled "Newman's Grim Reaper" by the media of Genoa City, leaving Nick and Victoria to regain the company from her clutches. They demonstrate her history of kleptomania to a court judge, forcing her to return to the psychiatric hospital for an evaluation. After passing the evaluation, Sharon returns to her position as CEO. Case called Sharon's return a "fun aspect of the story", but hoped that the writers wouldn't go the typical route whereby Victor would return and "wreak havoc on everyone". Sharon continues behaving out of character; when she discovers that Victor is alive, she tells everyone he died after identifying a burned body which was not his (Case said that Sharon took advantage of the situation). At Victor's funeral Sharon wears white, nearly marrying Tucker afterwards. Victor then returns, expelling Sharon from his family, home and company. Despite her crimes, Sharon avoids prison.

Case said she was unconcerned about the storyline because the writers had a plan to explain Sharon's behavior. New head writer Josh Griffith told TV Guide that the character would reach a "total mental breakdown", which would take her to the edge and beyond before being rebuilt. Griffith said the breakdown would help her find salvation, with a "stronger, more together, more evolved Sharon" emerging. Sharon breaks down at the main house of the Newman ranch, burning it down while under the influence of alcohol. Griffith stated that the damage Sharon has done to the Newman family is "physical, professional and emotional". After seeing a doctor, Sharon is diagnosed with bipolar disorder and begins treatment; however, she is alarmed after discovering she must take prescribed medication, possibly for the rest of her life. Case was happy with the outcome of the storyline, as were viewers of the show, with the actress stating: "Playing someone who is bipolar is very exhausting but it worked out perfectly and explained all of Sharon’s past behavior. I applaud Josh for making that decision because I think it makes the most sense considering her history." Case was also pleased that she didn't have to continue justifying Sharon's questionable actions.

"I've gotten a lot of comments from fans about how bipolar disorder has affected their own families, which has been very rewarding (...) The fact that the show opted to go in this brave, realistic route with Sharon has meant a lot to them."

— Case on the show's depiction of Sharon's bipolar disorder (2012)

In mid-2013, the paternity of Summer (now 18 years old) is questioned upon the revelation that Nick declared himself her father despite the initial paternity test being corrupt. Nick did this to fill the void left by Cassie's death. Sharon feels that Summer's birth and the affair between Nick and Phyllis ruined her destiny with him, so she makes the decision to change the results of another test undertaken by Nick; which revealed that he was in fact Summer's father. Following her controversially changing the results, Jack is believed by everyone to be Summer's father. The storyline received negative complaints from fans of the character. Discussing the storyline, Case explained that an unstable Sharon was trying to reverse the damage caused by Nick's affair with Phyllis. Phyllis overhears Sharon confessing to altering the test results; a fight between the two women in a stairwell results in Phyllis falling down the stairs and slipping into a coma.

In a February 2014 "super-secret plot twist", it was revealed that Victor had hired a Cassie doppelganger to haunt Sharon, who has been known to see visions of her deceased daughter while she was off her bipolar medication. Camryn Grimes (who is playing Cassie's lookalike Mariah Copeland) stated that Victor and Fake Cassie's "initial plan" was to make Nick believe Sharon was "nuts and seeing ghosts" so that he would not reunite with her. However, "then they find out Sharon has an explosive secret — one Victor can really use", that being the secret of Summer's paternity, which Sharon no longer recalls due to recent ECT treatment having resulted in memory loss. Sharon's mental instability continues to play a role in later storylines, with Case stating that she enjoys the challenging nature of playing Sharon as going "off the rails".

=== Baby Sully ===
In 2015, Sharon begins a relationship with Nick's other brother, Dylan McAvoy (Steve Burton), and becomes pregnant with his child. Sharon suffers miscarriage but does not tell Dylan, instead checking into Fairview Sanitarium; Case was disappointed when she heard Sharon would be institutionalized again. Case explained that Sharon was "feeling insecure at the time about her [relationship]. She was trying to build her relationship with Dylan and wasn't sure if he really wanted to be with her or if it was just because of the baby." The actress added that Sharon did not want "Dylan to go through what he went through before", having lost children previously. While in Fairview, Sharon encounters psychiatrist Dr. Anderson (Elizabeth Bogush), who in actuality is Sandra Allen, a woman seeking revenge on Nick for a diving accident during their high school years which left her paralyzed. At first, Case was not aware of Anderson's true identity, until she asked Bogush about her character. Sharon, who had been trying to conceive again, is drugged by Anderson into experiencing a phantom pregnancy. Anderson later presents Christian, the kidnapped newborn son of Nick's wife Sage Newman (Kelly Sullivan), to Sharon as her own child. Sharon, who does not remember giving birth, accepts that the baby is hers, and names him Sully. Case noted that "from Sharon's point of view, [Dr. Anderson] pulled off a miracle. And that's why she trusts her so much."

"No one in town wants to acknowledge that, for a long time, she really did think this baby was hers. She bonded with him. She loves him. The child’s real mother is dead and he’s been in good hands and in good health. Once Sharon learned the truth, she just froze. Giving up this baby would be devastating."

— Case explaining why Sharon concealed the truth about "Sully" (2016)

After experiencing memories of her stay at Fairview and suspicions about the birth of "Sully", Sharon pieces together the truth about Christian in April 2016. Dylan's aunt Patty Williams (Stacy Haiduk), who had been residing in Fairview at the time, informs Sharon that she never gave birth; Sharon conducts a DNA test which confirms that "Sully" is really Christian. Sage also discovers the truth herself and confronts Sharon, but ends up dying in a car accident. Sharon then decides to continue raising "Sully" as her own, not wanting to destroy her family with Dylan. She has nightmares of Sage and begins seeing her ghost, and briefly decides to stop taking her medication in order to "stay in control". Sharon tells nobody else besides Mariah the truth; Case enjoyed building Sharon and Mariah's relationship in the process of the storyline, observing that "they are each others confidantes".

Sharon ultimately confesses the truth about Christian in November 2016. Case noted that the fallout to Sharon's lies are "even bigger than she fears", with Sharon also wanting to protect Mariah who has become "guilty by association". The scandal surrounding Sharon and "Sully" breaks on the television show GC Buzz, with Case stating: "Sharon always knew the truth would come out. She was just trying to adjust her mind and heart to the inevitability, even though she was only making things worse." Despite her crime, Case also described Sharon as a victim, and contended that this was not the worst thing Sharon has done. After losing Christian to Nick, Sharon decides to fight for a place in his life. CBS Soaps In Depth wrote that her frustration over no one willing to understand her "is what finally lights a tiny flame of defiance deep inside Sharon".

== Storylines ==
Born on June 20, 1974, Sharon Collins grew up in Madison, Wisconsin. Having been abandoned by her father, she lived with her mother, Doris Collins (Karen Hensel), who uses a wheelchair after chasing a rebellious Sharon years earlier. Sharon became pregnant by high-school boyfriend Frank Barritt (Phil Dozois), but gave the child up for adoption.

In 1994, 18-year-old Sharon arrives in Genoa City and begins attending a local high school. She meets Nick Newman (son of wealthy tycoon Victor Newman), who is dating Amy Wilson (Julianne Morris). Nick falls in love with Sharon, despite Sharon's ex-boyfriend Matt Clark's (Eddie Cibrian) attempts to win her back. Nick and Sharon briefly separate after Matt exposes Sharon's secret about her motherhood at 16, but they reunite shortly afterwards. An angry Matt later rapes Sharon in his car, traumatizing her. Nick and Sharon become engaged; she tells him about the rape, which leads him to avenge Matt. Matt is shot, and Nick is the chief suspect. He is convicted and acquitted several months later, when Amy confesses to the shooting. After Matt leaves town, Nick and Sharon marry; to hold on to Nick, Sharon stops using birth control and becomes pregnant. Nick complains that he is unready for fatherhood; Sharon nearly has an abortion, but he stops her. In 1997, she gives birth to Noah Newman, who nearly dies after his premature birth. While Noah was critically ill Sharon's best friend Grace Turner (Jennifer Gareis) tracks down the child Sharon gave birth to as a teenager (Cassie) and brings her to Genoa City, believing Cassie would lessen the pain if Noah died. Noah survives, and Grace decides to raise Cassie as her own; however, her plans are foiled when Nick and Sharon win custody. Nick had cheated on Sharon with Grace (which nearly ended his and Sharon's marriage), but the custody battle for Cassie reunited them.

In 2001, Matt (Rick Hearst) returns to town after plastic surgery with a false identity, Carter Mills. He rapes Sharon, and his true identity is revealed when he dies after driving off a cliff. Sharon becomes pregnant, with Matt possibly the father of her child. During an argument with Nick Sharon trips and falls, giving birth to a stillborn baby girl. After a paternity test, Nick is revealed to be the baby's father. Sharon finds solace with the Newman ranch's handyman Diego Guittierez (Greg Vaughan), who had been dating Nick's sister Victoria, and her infidelity results in a breakup with Nick. Nick later sees Sharon kissing Victor, which leaves Sharon humiliated and depressed. She leaves town and meets Cameron Kirsten; they begin an affair, and he brutally abuses her. Sharon returns to Genoa after her injuries heal, but is horrified when Cameron comes to town on business with Newman Enterprises. She briefly believes that she killed him, but he is later tracked down and jailed for his crimes. Sharon becomes restless as a housewife, and wants to become a stripper; Nick gives her a job at spokesperson for Jabot Cosmetics to occupy her. In 2005, Cassie dies in a car accident after driving without a license. While Sharon is grieving, Nick cheats on her with Phyllis Summers and Sharon has a one-night stand with Victoria's husband, Brad Carlton. Nick and Sharon divorce, after twelve years of marriage, when Phyllis becomes pregnant with Nick's baby.

Sharon dates Phyllis' ex, Jack Abbott, and they eventually marry. Phyllis discovers Sharon's affair with Brad, and blackmails her. During a cliffside photo shoot Phyllis threatens to tell Jack about the affair, triggering a fight. Sharon and her best friend Drucilla Winters (Victoria Rowell) fall from the cliff, and Drucilla dies. Sharon is found apparently dead, but she is revived. Nick is later presumed dead after his plane crashes; he returns with amnesia (thinking he is still married to Sharon), regains his memory and returns to Phyllis. Jack, Phyllis, Nick and Sharon develop a magazine, Restless Style; however, clashes among the four drive Jack and Sharon from the company. In October 2008, Sharon and Nick meet in Paris; they kiss on a bridge, and Phyllis sees them. Sharon divorces Jack because his dishonesty; she and Nick make love at the Abbott cabin. Confused, Sharon spirals out of control; she develops kleptomania and has a brief affair with Jack's brother, Billy (Billy Miller). Sharon becomes pregnant; Nick goes back and forth between her and Phyllis, choosing Phyllis when Sharon lies about Jack being the father of the child. After being arrested for larceny a second time, Sharon checks herself into Fairview sanitarium (a psychiatric hospital) when her kleptomania becomes uncontrollable. She gives birth to a baby girl, Faith, who is stolen by Adam Newman (Nick's brother) and given to Jack's sister Ashley (Eileen Davidson) after he caused her miscarriage and hysterical pregnancy. Believing her baby is dead, Sharon grows close to Adam (who bonds with her out of guilt). Sharon and Adam are married, but when the truth about Faith is revealed the marriage ends. Several months later, Sharon shoots Adam when he tries to visit her at the Abbott cabin (mistaking him for a burglar); he survives. Nick and Sharon briefly reunite, but break up again when she cheats on him with Adam (who follows her to New Orleans).

Adam is convicted for the murder of his ex-wife, Skye Newman (Laura Stone). Sharon tries to help him, but is arrested for murder after finding Skye in Hawaii (where Skye fell into a volcano). After escaping and returning (after several months of being thought dead), Sharon is acquitted. She then dedicates herself to Victor, who is in jail protecting Nikki from a murder charge. Victor marries Sharon platonically to protect his assets, although the marriage is annulled two weeks later. Adam is believed to be permanently blind after an attack by Patty Williams, and Sharon helps him recover. They reunite, but more of his past schemes are revealed. After another nervous breakdown and a diagnosis of bipolar disorder (which made her remarry Victor and take over Newman Enterprises), Sharon is re-hired at Newman as vice president for research and development. Adam is shot saving Victor's life; before slipping into a coma he asks Sharon, his closest friend, to run Newman Enterprises. Sharon again becomes CEO of the company, angering the Newman's. She leaves the company upon Victor's return to run the company with Adam. Victor forces Adam, who is engaging in a sexual relationship with Sharon, to stop seeing her.

In 2013, it is revealed that the test conducted to determine Summer's paternity was inconclusive, which Nick kept a secret. Sharon, who now wants Nick back, tampers with the test results, allowing everyone to believe Jack is Summer's father. Phyllis hears Sharon confessing to this at Cassie's grave, resulting in an altercation between the two and ending with Phyllis falling down a flight of stairs, and into a coma. Noah discovers that Sharon is off her medication, attributing to her erratic behavior. Sharon realizes that she needs help, and soon begins taking new medication. She is hired by Jabot Cosmetics to mentor younger models. Sharon later undergoes electroconvulsive therapy (ECT) to stop experiencing visions of Cassie; which in reality is a Cassie lookalike named Mariah Copeland (Camryn Grimes) hired by Victor to haunt her. After the ECT, Sharon loses her memories of switching Summer's paternity results and witnessing Phyllis fall. By this point, Nick and Sharon have resumed their romantic relationship. After Victor's gaslighting of Sharon is exposed, Sharon becomes drawn to Mariah; inviting her to live with her family and having Nick hire her for a job at his club. Sharon throws Mariah out after realizing that Mariah has been trying to seduce Nick away from her. Simultaneously, Nick does some investigating and discovers that Mariah is Cassie's twin sister, and Sharon had no knowledge of giving birth to twins. Soon, Nick and Sharon are engaged; but their wedding is interrupted by a now awakened Phyllis (Gina Tognoni), who walks in and collapses. Later, Phyllis makes Sharon remember switching the test, and her engagement to Nick ends. A furious Nick sues Sharon for full custody of Faith and wins.

In 2015, Sharon is framed and arrested for the murders of Austin Travers (Matthew Atkinson) and Noah's fiancée Courtney Sloane (Kelli Goss), but acquitted due to lack of evidence. During this period, Dylan McAvoy (Steve Burton) becomes her confidant and the two start a romantic relationship. Sharon becomes pregnant with Dylan's child but suffers a miscarriage, and attempts to conceive again rather than tell him. After skipping her medication once again, Sharon returns to Fairview for treatment. There, she is drugged by Dr. Anderson (Elizabeth Bogush) into experiencing a false pregnancy. Dr. Anderson kidnaps what was believed to be Nick's baby with Sage Newman (Kelly Sullivan), Christian, and presents him to Sharon as her own; Sharon names him Sullivan "Sully" McAvoy. After being discharged from Fairview, Sharon and Dylan get married. In 2016, following Dr. Anderson's murder, both Sharon and Sage discover the truth about Sully being Christian. After Sage is killed in a car accident, Sharon continues raising Christian as her own, telling nobody aside from Mariah the truth. Months later, her secret is exposed and Christian is returned to Nick's custody. Soon after, Dylan goes undercover and is forced into the federal witness protection program. In order to conceal this, Sharon agrees to tell everyone Dylan left as a result of her lies about Christian's identity.

Sharon resumes ownership of the coffeehouse Crimson Lights, which was left to her by Dylan, and decides to return to university by enrolling at Genoa City University (GCU). With her marriage to Dylan over, she begins dating Scotty Grainger (Daniel Hall), but the relationship ends when he cheats on her with Abby (Melissa Ordway). In 2018, Sharon learns that Christian is actually Adam's son, a fact Chelsea Lawson (Melissa Claire Egan) and Victor had kept hidden. After being assaulted by Chelsea in an attempt to borrow time, Sharon ultimately tells Nick the truth about Christian's paternity. Nick moves back into Sharon's place and they soon get back together. In the midst of this, Sharon witnesses Nikki killing J.T. Hellstrom (Thad Luckinbill) in defense of Victoria, which she agrees to hide from everyone including Nick. Sharon assumes a maternal role in Christian's life, but Victor uses her history of mental illness to win temporary custody of Christian. Nick and Sharon subsequently become engaged again. Nick is briefly under the impression that Sharon ended their engagement, and sleeps with Phyllis. Meanwhile, Sharon graduates with a degree in psychology, and shortly thereafter is hired at the GCPD as a victim's liaison by Rey Rosales (Jordi Vilasuso). On the day of their wedding, Sharon learns about Nick's one night stand with Phyllis and dumps him at the altar. She soon develops feelings for Rey, and confesses the truth about J.T.'s death to him in 2019. Along with Victoria and Nikki, Sharon is arrested and sentenced to prison for covering up J.T.'s murder, but all are acquitted when it emerges that J.T. is alive. Sharon then begins a romance with Rey, though her renewed closeness with Adam causes them to break up. After sleeping with Adam, Sharon reunites with Rey. In 2020, Sharon is diagnosed with breast cancer, and later marries Rey.

== Reception ==
=== Characterization and criticism ===
Despite her crimes and faults, Global TV describes Sharon as a central heroine who has endured many challenges to get to where she is. After a few months in the role, Soap Opera Digest credited Case with making Sharon a popular teen heroine. Nine.com.au wrote that "While Sharon was introduced to Y&R as a love interest for Nick, she has become an iconic character in her own right." She is considered a fan favorite on the soap opera, but also a "love-her-or-hate-her character", and has divided viewer opinions. In an early observation of the character, Kathleen Sloan of the Toronto Star noted that Sharon's "angelic demeanor" could mask a "devil in disguise". Tommy Garrett of Canyon News describes Sharon as an "ever-suffering heroine, who can't find a break in life", stating that she has "faced it all". In 2009, Luke Kerr of Daytime Confidential noted that all of Sharon's love interests—including Jack, Brad and Nicholas—"seem to think" that she is "the perfect woman". Jamey Giddens (also from Daytime Confidential) described her as soap operas' "hottest mess".

During Maria Arena Bell's tenure as executive producer and head writer, the character's storyline underwent a change in creative direction, inciting unfavorable reviews. Bell had promised to make the character into a "stronger woman", but Jillian Bowe of Daytime Confidential criticized Bell for not living up to her pledge: "Has transforming Sharon into a promiscuous, recovering kleptomaniac, who never considers what her sexual choices will mean for her children, really made her stronger in [Bell]'s eyes?" She also contended that the beloved character was being "utterly assassinated, via one ill-conceived storyline and/or romance after another". Michael Logan of TV Guide noted that the character turned from heroine to a "psycho slut-nut" when she's "not channeling Joan Crawford in the Pepsi board room." Another writer from Daytime Confidential praised Case for giving "one wonky storyline after another" her best efforts in a character that was "once beloved" but had been "royally assassinated". Despite the negative reception, it was also noted by MSN's Deanna Barnert that viewers were "definitely loving Bitch Sharon" during the storyline where Sharon took control of Newman Enterprises in 2012. Furthermore, a September 2012 scene in which Sharon wore white to her husband Victor's funeral was described by co-star Joshua Morrow as "one of the best and funniest scenes" in the show's history. By the end of 2012, Aaron Hagey-MacKay of Global TV compared the "tortured soul" of Sharon to the character Nicole Walker on Days of Our Lives, writing: "Who had it worse this year, Sharon or Nicole?"

Mental health advocate Arthur Gallant of The Huffington Post commended the show's initial portrayal of Sharon's bipolar disorder, writing: "I praise the writers for their diligence in how mental illness has been depicted and feel the show has done their part in helping to eliminate mental health stigma." However, the storyline in which Sharon switched Summer's paternity test was heavily criticized by critics, who felt that the character still had not been repaired. About.com listed the paternity twist as one of the worst storylines of 2013 on the soap opera. Sara Bibel of Xfinity slammed Josh Griffith's writing, stating that he "undid all his great work rehabilitating the character of Sharon" in a "character-destroying" storyline. Soap Opera Digest named the character of Sharon as the "Most Ruined" soap opera character in both 2012 and 2013, while in turn praising the performance of Case. In December 2014, Daytime Confidential described Sharon as one of the most "drastically damaged" characters in the history of the soap opera genre, and wrote, "You name it, one head writer or another has had her do it. Kleptomania. Three baby daddies. Bipolar disorder. It was almost like a reward was passed out in the Y&R writing room anytime anyone came up with something more awful to have Sharon do." Giddens criticized Charles Pratt Jr. in 2015 for enjoying writing Sharon as "crazy", "despite legions of fans demanding the bipolar character be given back her dignity". Writing for TV Insider, Michael Logan said in 2016 that fans of the character were tired of seeing her written as "the liar, the villain, the nutcase, the doormat".

In 2022, Charlie Mason from Soaps She Knows placed Sharon 11th on his list of the best 25 characters from The Young and the Restless, commenting that "The Perils of Pauline got nothin' on The Travails of Sharon, a hard-luck heroine whose good fortune seemed to end with the discovery of the right actress to play the part (Sharon Case, on try No. 3). Since then, she's been cheated on, divorced, assaulted, imprisoned, diagnosed as bipolar and taken too deeply into our hearts to ever be removed."

=== Romances ===
The relationship between Sharon and Nick relationship is popular with viewers, and they are considered a prominent soap-opera supercouple. The pair are known by the portmanteau "Shick" in social media. Kim Potts of The Huffington Post ranked Nick and Sharon 16th on a list of "Greatest Soap Opera Supercouples". Potts observed that although they have not become "enduring love", a reunion is "always a possibility". Upon their anticipated reunion in February 2009, the show gained an average of 447,000 viewers, boosting it to nearly 5.7 million viewers and a 4.0 household rating. The couple were nominated for "Best Chemistry" at the CBS Fan Awards for 2014. Sharon's romance with Adam has also gained a fan following, and they are known as "Shadam" in social media. The couple are perceived as "showing us the many shades of love. In this case, mostly dark", according to SoapNet. The show gained 115,000 viewers after their reunion in December 2010. In 2012, Sharon's romance with Victor was the source of disapproval from actors, critics and viewers. Of the relationship, journalist Michael Fairman said it "hasn’t worked out or caught fire through the writing, or with the fans watching on-screen!" Several cast members expressed negative opinions about the relationship, and Daytime Confidential placed Sharon and Victor atop its "Worst Soap Opera Couples" list for that year.

=== Portrayal ===
"Since she began her journey as Sharon 16 years ago, Sharon Case has shown off her flexibility as an actress. From Nick's sweet and slightly shy girlfriend to young wife and mother, from business-savvy executive to bipolar tart with a penchant for bad choices, we've seen many sides to the beauty."

— Soaps in Depth (2013)

Case has received a number of honors for her portrayal of Sharon, including Daytime Emmy Award nominations in 1996 and 1997 for Outstanding Younger Actress. At the Soap Opera Digest Awards in 1998, she won the Hottest Female Star award. In 1999 she won a Daytime Emmy Award for Outstanding Supporting Actress in a Drama Series, her first nomination in that category; she was nominated for the same category in 2000 and 2004. At the 2003 Soap Opera Digest Awards, Case received an Outstanding Supporting Actress nomination. That year, she won an Australian TV Soap Golden Boomerang Award for Younger Female Star. Dan J. Kroll of Soap Central noted that it had "widely been expected" that Morrow and Case would receive nominations for Outstanding Leading Actress and Actor at the 33rd Daytime Emmy Awards, calling these "surprising oversights".

Tommy Garrett of Canyon News wrote, "Maria Bell knows that consummate actress Sharon Case plays the consummate heroine Sharon Newman with aplomb." In January 2011, a Daytime Emmy Awards "final push" by Canyon News suggested that Case's performance needed more Emmy attention. Soap Opera Digest praised Phyllis finding the evidence that freed Sharon from prison in 2011, writing: "The twist that Phyl hijacked the glory from both Adam and estranged sister Avery was downright delicious—and made Sharon beholden her worst enemy. The cherry on top? Sharon giving Adam an overdue verbal beatdown. Justice has finally been served." Case's performance in 2012, described as a "whirlwind year", was met with critical acclaim due to writing by Bell (which, in turn, was criticized). On-Air On-Soaps commented, "Surviving probably one of the worst on-screen character assassinations in soap opera history, which virtually left viewers wondering, what the heck are the writers doing to the integrity of Sharon Newman, the once befallen heroine of Genoa City?, Case rebounded by making her performances noteworthy, no matter what the creative teams decided to do to her character." This led Soap Opera Uncensored to name her Entertainer of the Year in January 2013. In December 2015, Soap Opera Digest praised her portrayal of the character's "emotional roller coaster" and remarked, "Sharon Case has a knack for bringing emotional depth and reality to even the most outrageously soapy situations".

Charlie Mason from Soaps She Knows placed the casting of Mark as Sharon on his list of the worst soap opera recasts of all time, and said that the soap "finally found a Sharon with staying power" when they cast Case in the role.

In December 2024, as part of their year-end listings, Soap Opera News named Case at their top female performer. For her performance as Sharon, Case was named by TV Insider as their sixth best performance, in ranking their "21 Best Soap Performances of 2024". In the article, editor Michael Maloney wrote: "One reason that Case is so compelling to watch is that even when Sharon Newman is out of control, viewers are witnessing a tour de force by Sharon Case, who is in total command of her craft. Case especially shines when Sharon stands toe-to-toe with rival Phyllis, played by Michelle Stafford."

== In other media ==
Sharon Newman is featured on the cover of the book You Know Your Life is a Soap Opera If... (2007) by author Gerry Waggett. In November 2014, the character appeared in a comedic skit on the HBO television program Last Week Tonight with John Oliver.
