= List of The Young and the Restless characters introduced in 2017 =

The Young and the Restless is an American television soap opera. It was first broadcast on March 26, 1973, and airs on CBS. The following is a list of characters that first appeared on the soap opera in 2017, by order of first appearance. All characters are introduced by executive producer Mal Young and co-executive producer/head writer Sally Sussman. In October 2017, Sussman departed as co-executive producer and head writer; Young remained as executive producer and was promoted as head writer.

== Alex Dettmer ==
Alex Dettmer, portrayed by Jessica Nicole Webb, was introduced on January 11 as the employee of crime lord, Luther Fisk. Serial Scoop reported the casting on January 6, 2017. Webb's previous credits include They Live Among Us, The Exorcist Files and Futurestates. Alex was created as part of Steve Burton's exit storyline for the character of Dylan McAvoy.

== Craig Shields ==
Craig Shields portrayed by Kristian Kordula is introduced as a friend of Michael Baldwin (Christian LeBlanc). Kordula made his debut on January 18, 2017. The casting and character were first reported on January 8 by Serial Scoop.

== Zoey ==
Zoey, portrayed by Annalisa Cochran, is introduced as the love interest of Reed Hellstrom on January 24, 2017.

== Benjamin Hochman ==
Benjamin Hochman, portrayed by Ben Hermes, is introduced in January 2017 as a recently divorced billionaire corporate raider and financier from Chicago with a reputation for having dismantled nationwide department stores. He met with Lauren Fenmore hoping to invest in her company but Lauren's mother-in-law Gloria Abbott Bardwell interfered and stopped the deal. He appeared in April when he encountered Ashley Abbott and Ravi Shapur in New York City where he attempted a romance with Ashley but she resisted and Ravi defended Ashley and both left with a low opinion of Hochman.

Hochmnan returned to Genoa City in August 2017 looking for new investment opportunities and unexpectedly began a professional and personal relationship with Victoria Newman. He entered into a secret business alliance with Jack Abbott and Phyllis Summers to take down Victoria's company Brash & Sassy. The venture was successful at first despite many people warning Victoria not to trust or do business with Hochman but she ignored the warnings due to her company's dire financial situation. Jack raised the rent on Brash & Sassy 25% and secretly told Hochman to get Victoria to sign a bridge loan agreement with Hochman that would end Brash & Sassy and thus eliminate Jack's major competitor. Initially ready to sign Victoria tore up the contract when she discovered Hochman had a meeting with her former employee Cane Ashby and ended their professional and personal relationship. Hilary Curtis clandestinely taped Hochman and Victoria as they discussed their past business and personal matters and aired the footage on her show The Hilary Hour.

== Jordan Wilde ==
Jordan Wilde
- The Young and the Restless character
- Portrayed by: Darnell Kirkwood
- Duration: 2017–18
- First appearance: February 10, 2017
- Last appearance: February 5, 2018
- Created by: Sally Sussman
- Introduced by: Mal Young
In-universe information
- Occupation: Photographer

Jordan Wilde, portrayed by Darnell Kirkwood, is introduced as a photographer for Brash & Sassy on February 10, 2017.

Jordan is brought in as a photographer for a photo shoot at Brash & Sassy. Jordan reconnects with Lily Winters (Christel Khalil) whom he worked with when he was starting out as a photographer at Jabot Cosmetics. They reminisce about their early days in the industry and Jordan credits his first shoot with Lily as the reason for him being a success. Lily later confides in Jordan that she is considering giving up modeling again to focus on her marriage but he encourages her to do what makes her happy.

In December 2016, the series released a casting call for the character under the alias "Ryder." The actor was due to start filming on January 6, 2017. Kirkwood's casting and character was officially announced on January 10. The original casting notice described the character as an African-American male in his early 30s, at least "6 feet tall" and a "gifted photographer with swagger." Kambra Clifford said the casting notice was reminiscent of a young Malcolm Winters, a role originated by Shemar Moore. The character was written out in November 2017. However Soaps Opera Digest hinted at the possibility of a return.

== Juliet Helton ==
Juliet Helton
- The Young and the Restless character
- Portrayed by: Laur Allen
- Duration: 2017
- First appearance: February 28, 2017
- Last appearance: November 8, 2017
- Created by: Sally Sussman
- Introduced by: Sally Sussman and Mal Young
In-universe information
- Occupation: Consultant for Brash and Sassy
- Children: Sam Ashby

Juliet Helton, portrayed by Laur Allen, was introduced in 2017 as a consultant hired by Victoria Newman (Amelia Heinle) for her cosmetics company, Brash & Sassy. Allen's casting was exclusively reported by Soaps in Depth on January 31, 2017. Allen made her debut on February 28. Juliet and Cane Ashby have a drunken one night stand while on business in Tokyo. Juliet soon discovers she is pregnant, and the revelation shatters Cane and Lily's marriage. Juliet, with encouragement from Hilary Curtis, files a sexual harassment suit against Cane after he tries to cover up what happened in Tokyo. Juliet wins the case and Lily kicks Cane out of their house. Cane moves into the Chancellor mansion, and Juliet soon follows, as her pregnancy becomes risky after she suffers fainting spells. Cane and Lily file for divorce, and at the courthouse, Juliet comes in just as Cane and Lily are about to reconcile. Juliet's appearance causes Lily to change her mind and carry on with the proceedings. Juliet returns to the lobby, and she sits down and realizes she is bleeding. She faints and Charlie Ashby catches her and calls for help. Juliet is rushed to the hospital where she gives birth prematurely and passes away. The baby survives, and Cane names him Sam, after his late sister. Nobody attends Juliet's funeral, save for Cane and Hilary. Juliet's father refuses to attend as he believes his daughter disgraced the family with the affair. Cane and Lily begin to bond again while tending to Sam.

== Tessa Porter ==
Tessa Porter
- The Young and the Restless character
- Portrayed by: Cait Fairbanks
- Duration: 2017–present
- First appearance: March 24, 2017
- Created by: Sally Sussman
- Introduced by: Sally Sussman and Mal Young
In-universe information
- Occupation: Restaurant manager; Model; Barista; Assistant; Musician; Con-woman
- Sisters: Crystal Porter
- Wife: Mariah Copeland (2022–present)
- Adoptive children: Aria Porter-Copeland

Tessa Porter, portrayed by Cait Fairbanks, was introduced in 2017. The casting was announced on February 24, 2017, and Fairbanks made her debut on March 24. Fairbanks was demoted to recurring status in July 2019. One of Tessa's major storylines was her prostitute sister Crystal, and working with Mariah Copeland to save her. Tessa dated Noah Newman for a few months but the couple broke up when Noah found out that she kissed Mariah.

Tessa was signed as an artist to Devon Hamilton's label and streaming service but was dropped when she lied about using Mariah's words from a journal to create a new song. Tessa was subsequently hired as Devon's assistant.

Tessa later finds out that Nikki Newman killed J. T. Hellstrom, with the help of Sharon, Phyllis, and Nikki's daughter, Victoria. Tessa uses this information to secretly blackmail them, and uses the money to help her sister cross the border to Canada. This causes a strain on her and Mariah's relationship. In J. T.'s murder trial, it is exposed publicly that Tessa is the blackmailer, and was awaiting trial, however the charges were dropped against her.

In April 2019, Tessa begins to tap back into her love of music, and is signed once again by LP Streaming, however this time managed by Ana Hamilton. Mariah and Ana clash, when Ana insists on changing Tessa's music as well as image, however later all come to a mutual understanding. Tessa also begins singing to Abbott matriarch Dina Mergeron, as she transitions into a memory care facility.

In 2022, Tessa and Mariah married. Eventually they adopt a baby girl they name Aria Porter-Copeland. Recently, their marriage has been put to the test when Ian Ward came back to town and Tessa and Daniel Romalotti became closer.

== Zack Stinnet ==
Zack Stinnet, portrayed by Ryan Ashton, was introduced as a love interest for Abby Newman (Melissa Ordway). The casting was announced in April 2017 and Ashton made his debut on May 18. Zack dated Abby Newman while she helped finance his dating app Design Date through her incubator project. It was eventually revealed that the site was a front to a sex trafficking ring. Zack was killed after being shot by Crystal, one of his former girls, while he threatened Abby and Scott Grainger.
