= Cait Fairbanks =

American actress and singer-songwriter (born 1993)

- Born: Caitlin Elizabeth Baunoch; July 29, 1993 (age 33); Michigan, U.S.
- Other names: Cait Baunoch, Ginesse
- Occupations: Actress; singer-songwriter
- Years active: 2001–present

Caitlin Elizabeth Baunoch (born July 29, 1993), known professionally as Cait Fairbanks, is an American actress and singer-songwriter. She plays Tessa Porter in the CBS daytime soap opera The Young and the Restless, for which she was nominated for two Daytime Emmy Awards. As a musician, she performs as Cait Fairbanks and Ginesse.

== Career ==
Fairbanks started performing on stage at the age of eight and has since performed in over 20 professional, regional, and community theatre productions, including the Off-Broadway production of Heathers: The Musical in 2014 (she played Veronica and Heather Duke) and 13 (musical) (she played Lucy).

Fairbanks also played Young Mindy in CSI:NY and Gabby Walsh in Untold Stories of the E.R.. Since 2017, Fairbanks has been playing Tessa Porter, a singer-songwriter, on The Young and The Restless. Portraying Tessa Porter allows Fairbanks to perform her own compositions on the daytime soap opera.

== Personal life ==
As of 2019, Fairbanks confirmed that she was dating fellow co-star Zach Tinker who portrayed Fenmore Baldwin. They broke up in 2021.

== Filmography ==
Year	Title	Role	Notes
2006	Untold Stories of the E.R.	Gabby Walsh	Episode: "Director Down"; Credited as Caitlin Elizabeth Baunoch
2007	CSI: NY	Mindy Sanchez (age 14)	Episode: "Cold Reveal"; Credited as Caitlin Elizabeth Baunoch
2008	Everybody Hates Chris	Darlene	Episode: "Everybody Hates the Ninth-Grade Dance"; Credited as Caitlin Elizabeth Baunoch
2008	Lincoln Heights	Kennedy	Episode: "The New Wild Ones"; Credited as Caitlin Baunoch
2010	Two and a Half Men	Joanne	Episode: "Three Girls and a Guy Named Bud"; Credited as Cait Baunoch
2013	The Middle	Amanda	Episode: "Valentine's Day IV"
2016	K.C. Undercover	Ursula Witt	2 episodes
2017–present	The Young and the Restless	Tessa Porter	Contract role
2021	The Goldbergs	Paula Hogan	Episode: "Alligator Schwartz"
2023	Chicago Fire	Kayla	Episode: "How Does It End?"

== Discography ==
As Cait Fairbanks:

- Digging My Own Grave – single (2016)
- Fight or Flight – single (2017)
- With Me – single (2017)
- Joy to the World – single (2017)
- How Could a Lie Feel So True – single (2018)
- When I See You – single (2019)
- Clear My Mind - single (2019)
- Umbrella (Live) [Unplugged] – single (2019)
- Love Me – single (2019)
- Something in You - single (2019)
- If You're not Busy - single (2019)
- More Than a Vow - single (2020)
- Milky Way (Feat. RC Cates) - single (2021)
- Everytime - single (2022)
- Silver Line - single (2022)

As Ginesse:

- Bedford – single (2018)
- Noise – single (2019)
- The Inbetween – single (2019)
- Somewhere to Die - EP (2020)
- Gatorade - single (2021)
