= Camryn Grimes =

American actress (born 1990)

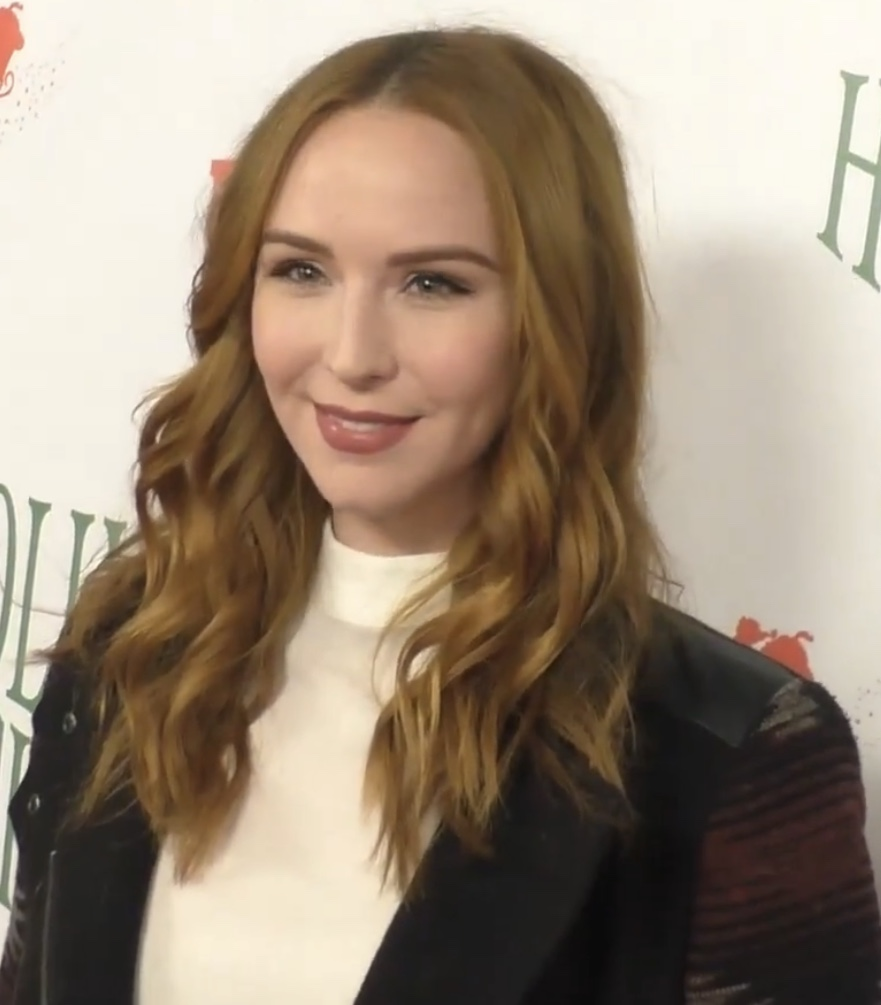
- Grimes in 2016
- Born: January 7, 1990 (age 36)
- Occupation: Actress
- Years active: 1997–present
- Spouse: Brock Powell (m. 2025)
- Children: 1
- Relatives: Scott Grimes (uncle)

Camryn Grimes (born January 7, 1990) is an American actress. She is best known for playing Cassie Newman on The Young and the Restless (1997–2005), later making sporadic appearances before returning full-time to the soap opera in 2014 as a new character, Mariah Copeland (2014–present). For her performances, she has received six Daytime Emmy Award nominations and won twice: Outstanding Younger Actress in a Drama Series in 2000 for her role as Cassie (out of four nominations in the category), and Outstanding Supporting Actress in a Drama Series in 2018 for her role as Mariah (out of two nominations in the category).

== Career ==
She played Cassie Newman on The Young and the Restless starting in 1997. In May 2005, Grimes's character was written off the show when she died from injuries sustained in a car accident. Since departing the show, she has made several guest appearances as Cassie's spirit. In 2014, she began a new role on the series, playing a woman with a resemblance to Cassie, named Mariah Copeland, later revealed to be Cassie's twin sister. It was announced on May 5, 2014, that Grimes was put on contract with The Young and the Restless.

Grimes played the part of Holly in the 2001 film Swordfish alongside Hugh Jackman, Halle Berry, and John Travolta. She guest-starred on Medium, JAG, NCIS, and ER.

== Personal life ==
Grimes is the daughter of Preston Lee and Heather Grimes and the niece of actor Scott Grimes. She is the oldest of seven children. In November 2025, she married Brock Powell after they began dating in 2020. Together, they have one child, a son, born in December 2023.

== Filmography ==
Film roles
Year	Title	Role	Notes
2001	Swordfish	Holly Jobson	
2005	Paper Bags	Daughter	Short film
2012	The Bournes Anonymous	Jason Bourne	Short film
2012	Magic Mike	Birthday Girl	
2013	A.W.O.L.	Lucia	Short film; also executive producer
2016	I Would Kill for That	Tracy	Short film
2022	Mickey Saves Christmas	Mrs. Claus (voice)	Short film

Television roles
Year	Title	Role	Notes
1997	JAG	Lisa Frankel	Episode: "The Court-Martial of Sandra Gilbert"
1997–2007, 2009–10, 2013–present	The Young and the Restless	Cassie Newman; Mariah Copeland	Role from: March 19, 1997 – May 24, 2005, June 7, 2005, July 5 and 25, 2005, August 19, 2005, September 8, 2005, January 13, 2006, May 23–24, 2006, June 14, 2007, May 6, 2009, March 15, 2010, July 9, 2013 – January 9, 2014, September 7, 2014, October 30, 2014, February 7, 2020, March 31, 2021, December 24, 2021; Role from: January 27, 2014 – present
2000	Sharing the Secret	Rachel	Television film
2005	Medium	Sharona	Episode: "Coming Soon"
2005	ER	Erin Short	Episode: "Alone in a Crowd"
2008	Ghost Whisperer	Diana Morrison	Episode: "Bloodline"
2009	Cold Case	Edna Reed 1944	Episode: "WASP"
2010	NCIS: Los Angeles	Diane Farley	Episode: "Special Delivery"
2011	Make It or Break It	Suzanne	Episode: "The Buddy System"
2014	The Mentalist	Deanne Price	Episode: "Forest Green"
2016	Animal Kingdom	Jasmine	Episode: "Dead to Me"
2017	The Get	Pregnant Amy	Television film
2019	NCIS	Marine Corporal Laney Alimonte	Episode: "Wide Awake"
2022–23	Hamster & Gretel	Tina, Record Scratch (voice)	2 episodes

Video Games
Year	Title	Role	Notes
2026	Mouse: P.I. for Hire	Tammy Tumbler	Grouped under "Voice Cast"

== Awards and nominations ==
List of acting awards and nominations for Camryn Grimes
Year	Award	Category	Title	Result	Ref.
1998	Daytime Emmy Award	Outstanding Younger Actress in a Drama Series	The Young and the Restless	Nominated	
1998	Young Artist Award	Best Performance in a Daytime Drama: Young Performers (Male & Female)	The Young and the Restless	Nominated	
1998	YoungStar Award	Best Young Actress in a Daytime TV Program	The Young and the Restless	Nominated	
1999	Daytime Emmy Award	Outstanding Younger Actress in a Drama Series	The Young and the Restless	Nominated	
1999	Young Artist Award	Best Performance in a Daytime Serial: Young Performer	The Young and the Restless	Nominated	
2000	Daytime Emmy Award	Outstanding Younger Actress in a Drama Series	The Young and the Restless	Won	
2000	YoungStar Award	Best Young Actress in a Daytime TV Program	The Young and the Restless	Nominated	
2006	Daytime Emmy Award	Outstanding Younger Actress in a Drama Series	The Young and the Restless	Nominated	
2018	Daytime Emmy Award	Outstanding Supporting Actress in a Drama Series	The Young and the Restless	Won	
2026	Daytime Emmy Award	Outstanding Supporting Actress in a Drama Series	The Young and the Restless	Pending	
