= Mariah Copeland =

Fictional character from The Young and the Restless

- The Young and the Restless character
- Portrayed by: Camryn Grimes
- Duration: 2014–present
- First appearance: January 27, 2014
- Created by: Shelly Altman, Jean Passanante and Tracey Thomson
- Introduced by: Jill Farren Phelps
In-universe information
- Other names: Cassie Newman
- Occupation: Business executive; Producer; Talk show host; Fashion assistant; Bartender; Con-woman
- Parents: Frank Barritt; Sharon Newman
- Siblings: Cassie Newman; Noah Newman; Faith Newman
- Spouse: Tessa Porter (2022–present)
- Children: Aria Porter-Copeland
- Grandparents: Doris Collins

Mariah Copeland is a fictional character from the American soap opera The Young and the Restless, portrayed by Camryn Grimes. Introduced by executive producer Jill Farren Phelps, the character made her first appearance on January 27, 2014. Grimes had previously played the role of Cassie Newman from 1997 to 2005, when the character was killed off.

Mariah first appears in Genoa City, hired by Victor Newman to gaslight his former daughter-in-law Sharon Newman by posing as the ghost of Sharon's deceased daughter, Cassie, with whom she bears a remarkable resemblance. When the truth about her association with Victor is revealed, Sharon becomes drawn to a troubled Mariah, whom she moves into her home. Meanwhile, it is revealed that Mariah is the notorious ex-girlfriend of Tyler Michaelson; and she is also linked to cult leader Ian Ward. While living with Sharon and Nick Newman, Cassie's adoptive father, Mariah develops an infatuation with Nick. It is soon discovered that Mariah is actually Cassie's twin sister and the daughter Sharon did not know she had. Her birth was kept secret, following Ian's arrangements for Mariah to be stolen at birth, and Ian acted as a father figure to her for years. Mariah subsequently has relationships with Kevin Fisher—a dynamic which allowed Grimes to explore comic relief—and Devon Hamilton. She then develops feelings for her brother's girlfriend, Tessa Porter.

Phelps described Mariah as a "loose cannon," while Grimes has characterized her as a "bad girl with a heart" and more dimensional than what viewers would expect her to be. Reaction to Grimes' return to the soap opera has been positive. Mariah's relationship with another woman proved controversial due to the soap opera's conservative audience, with TV Insider reporting that a gag order prevented Grimes from discussing it with the press. Nonetheless, the storyline also received positive reception and earned Grimes the Daytime Emmy Award for Outstanding Supporting Actress in a Drama Series in 2018, her second Daytime Emmy win. She received a second nomination in the category in 2026.

== Casting and creation ==
Camryn Grimes first appeared as the character on January 27, 2014. Grimes had previously portrayed the role of Cassie Newman, Mariah's twin sister, on the series from 1997 to 2005, when the character was killed off in a car accident. Grimes was seven when she originated the role of Cassie and, in 2000, became the youngest recipient of the Daytime Emmy Award for Outstanding Younger Actress in a Drama Series. Over the years following her death, Grimes made several guest appearances as Cassie's ghost, which she played most recently from July 2013. Although "Ghost Cassie" continued to make numerous appearances to her mother Sharon Newman (Sharon Case), it became apparent in February 2014 on-screen that the character appearing was not a spirit, and was in fact a real person. Grimes later revealed that her return as Cassie's ghost was only slated to last four to six episodes.

When Grimes learned that she was no longer portraying Cassie's ghost but another character, the actress stated: "I heard rumors that the storyline might be changing, that somehow I would be continuing on the show. I had all these ideas going through my head but I was thinking of the obvious things, like maybe Cassie had a twin sister nobody knew about (...) But what the writers came up with is so much fun and so unexpected," stating that the new character had "potential to go all over the place". In March 2014, Grimes stated that she had little knowledge of the character, stating that it was "very much a reveal for me as it is for the audience" and "I am still learning new things about who the character is." The following month, it was revealed that the character's name was Mariah Copeland, the ex-girlfriend of already established character Tyler Michaelson (Redaric Williams). In May 2014, Grimes announced that she was now on contract with The Young and the Restless. In a featured interview with Soaps in Depth, Grimes stated: "Looking back after a year, it's kind of crazy to see how things have developed. I'm playing a completely new character and I'm under contract — I would never have guessed that a year ago it would've turned into this!"

== Development ==
=== Characterization and portrayal ===
"Whereas Cassie had everything, Mariah had nothing, and the more she sees of the Newmans' life, the more she resents getting so little. Sure, we've seen that Mariah has a heart — she knows how much her Cassie face means to Sharon and is touched by that — but that's not the real her. There are no limits to what this woman will do to get what she doesn't have. Mariah is one very loose cannon."

— Executive producer Jill Farren Phelps discussing Mariah (April 2014)

Mariah experienced an "emotionally deprived youth", and according to Grimes, acts a "little bitchy". Executive producer Jill Farren Phelps labelled Mariah as a "have-not", which is a "very powerful" driving force for her behavior. Soap Opera Digest noted the character to be mischievous. Grimes loves the "bite" and stated that she is a "bad girl with a heart". Mariah has a "sassy, sarcastic, dry humor".

Grimes has praised the show's writing team for giving her material that makes her return a "seamless transition". Explaining how the differences between Mariah and Cassie impact her portrayal, she said: "(...) as I've gotten older, you grow and your personality grows. I think I've honed in on what my thing is. A lot of me is very sarcastic and very dry, so I incorporate that. Now that I'm older and I have more sense of self, I try to incorporate who I am now, as opposed to who I was when I was playing Cassie. So Mariah is a fuller person."

=== Introduction ===
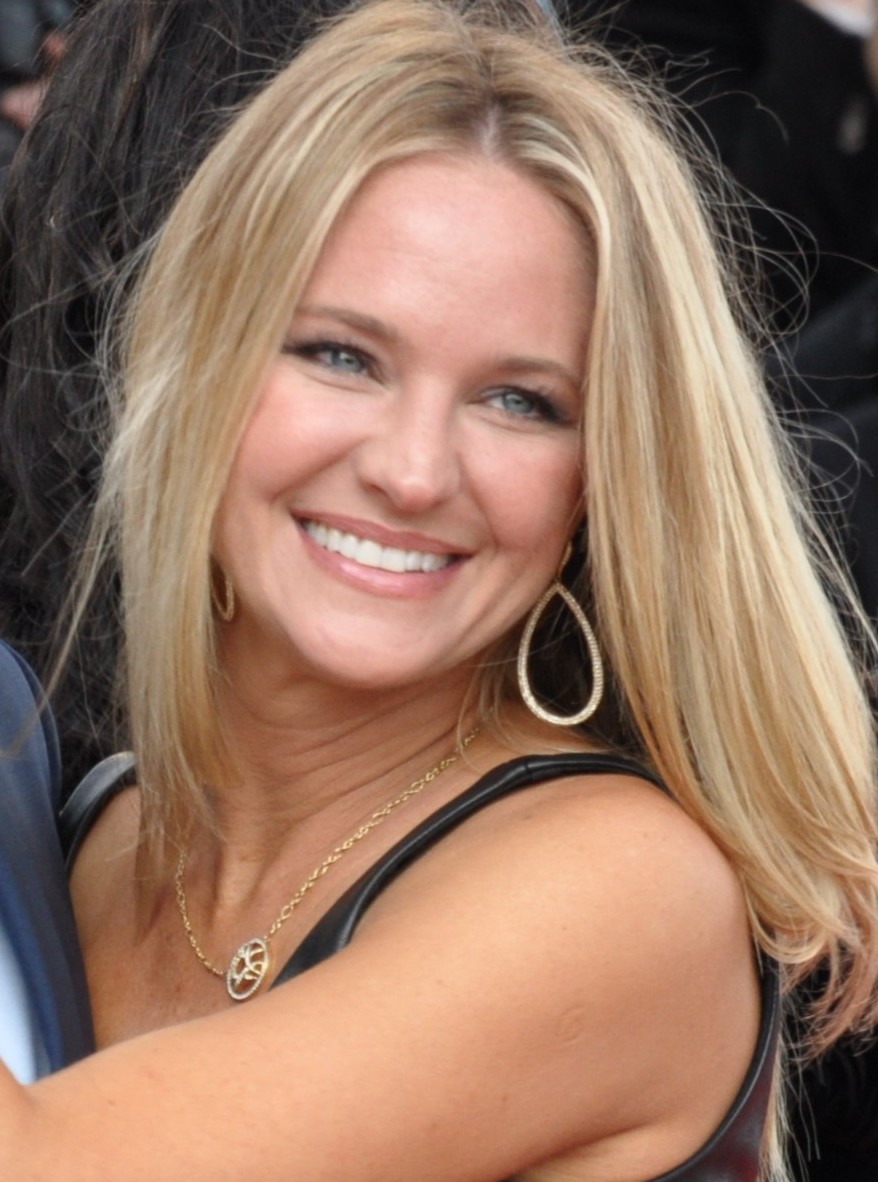
Sharon Case plays Sharon Newman, Mariah's biological mother whom she comes into contact with after being hired to gaslight her by Victor Newman (Eric Braeden).

Upon the revelation that Cassie's "ghost" was an actual person hired by Cassie's adoptive grandfather, Victor Newman (Eric Braeden) to gaslight her mother Sharon, several connections which Mariah shared with other characters on the show's canvas came to light. Victor's intentions were to make his son, Nicholas Newman (Joshua Morrow) believe Sharon is mentally unstable and "seeing ghosts" so that he would not become romantically involved with her again. Grimes described the character as "ballsy" and found the nature of her relationship with her employee, Victor, to be surprising. Co-head writer Jean Passanante noted that the character's edge became clear in her interactions with Victor, finding it "startling and exciting". TV Guide characterized Mariah as a "scam artist" for her role in Victor's scheme against Sharon. However, Mariah became somewhat sympathetic towards Sharon, with Grimes stating that the audience would see a "more dimensional character than everybody would think". Grimes also stated that she likes how Mariah "is not Cassie", stating: "It would be fun to have her make some friends her own age. Nobody likes Mariah! And I'd like to explore just who she is. What is she good at? Does she have any talents? Is she a closeted photographer?" The actress is also not opposed to a love interest, but wishes they would "stay away from incest with Nick or Noah". Grimes pictures Mariah being paired with a "bad boy".

Executive producer Jill Farren Phelps stated that it was the soap's intention to make Cassie's doppelgänger turn out to be Mariah all along. She said: "As soon as Tyler even mentioned there was a Mariah, the writers new it would be Fake Cassie", stating that Mariah would now become a threat to Tyler's relationship with Abby Newman (Melissa Ordway). Phelps described Mariah as a "wild girl" as opposed to Cassie, who was a "good girl". Simultaneously, it was revealed that Mariah was connected to the "nefarious" and "evil" Ian Ward (Ray Wise). Phelps noted that both Mariah and Ian were both "plain bad", and that there would be a "much bigger picture to be revealed" in relation to their relationship. Writer Shelly Altman stated that, "It is clear that Ian cared for her differently than the way he relates to other people."

=== Crush on Nick ===
"Other than Ian, Mariah hasn't really had a father figure, and Nick is a good guy, so it makes sense. I just hope she starts to realize that's not actually the right avenue to explore!"

— Camryn Grimes explaining Mariah's infatuation with Nick Newman (Joshua Morrow)

While living with Nick and Sharon, Mariah develops an "increasing interest" and crush on Nick and begins planning to seduce him, despite the fact that she is identical to his deceased daughter. She prepares a meal for Nick and begins wearing revealing outfits. Grimes, who portrayed Morrow's on-screen daughter for years, said that she "really did not think they would really go down that road, and then ... they really went down that road". In an interview with Soaps in Depth, Grimes stated: "I've known Joshua [Morrow] since I was 6! I kind of saw him as my own dad, so I would never, ever look at him that way. It's just not possible for me to think like that. At the end of the day, I am an actor, but it's not my favorite storyline. Of course, Josh thinks it's hysterical while I'm off cringing in the corner. I'm ready to gag, and he's laughing his head off!" She described Morrow as being like her father: "I saw him every day for the first 10 years of my life. They gave me hell because they saw how uncomfortable I was and they thought it was the funniest thing on the planet." Christian Today noted that Mariah was in "hot pursuit" of Nick. Mariah begins misinterpreting Nick's kindness to her. The peak of the story line involved a fantasy of Mariah's, in which she and Nick drew in for a kiss, before the shot ended. Grimes said, "We did this thing where I literally got so close to Joshua's face, and then they yelled 'Cut!' Then after that, I fell to the ground." Sharon soon catches Mariah dressed in "intimate apparel", and Mariah confesses to her "hidden motives" where Nick is concerned, inciting a major argument which results in a sickened Sharon throwing Mariah out. Speaking of the scenes where Sharon and Mariah engaged in a "war of words", Grimes stated that "Those were tough, because there was a lot of dialog, and it was scene after scene (...) it’s fun to get in a fight with somebody on-screen, especially when it’s that charged."

=== Maternity reveal ===
After being thrown out by Sharon, Mariah disappears and it is soon revealed that she has been kidnapped by Ian. Ian drugs Mariah and forces her to marry him. After being rescued by Nick and Sharon, Mariah learns that Sharon, "the woman she despises", is actually her biological mother, and does not handle the news well. Prior to the kidnapping, Nick tracked down the doctor (Dr. Hill) that delivered Cassie and learns that Sharon (a poor teenager at the time) was drugged after giving birth to her, and had in fact delivered twins. Helen Copeland (Karina Logue), a "bitter" woman who claimed to be Mariah's mother for her entire life, was the nurse present who bought the baby for Ian from Dr. Hill, who needed the money for gambling debts. Grimes explained that Mariah has had the "rug pulled from out under her" with this news, stating that "This has been a stressful time for her. I think any change or new information at this point, or anybody's perceived happiness, will be very upsetting, because she has been through so much." The actress also noted that Mariah finds herself in a state of limbo, "She is wandering about, and she is not really sure what she wants. She is trying to determine if she is going to flee, because that is what she is so used to doing, or what is keeping her here. I think right now she is trying to figure out where she belongs, and how she is going to take this next step." Mariah maintains that she wants nothing to do with Sharon, but they later forge a relationship. Grimes opined: "Mariah is smart and independent, but she has a lot of growing up to do. She needs to find her place in the world and reaching out to those around her—including her new family—will only help that process. I don't think Sharon and Mariah will ever stay mad at each other for too long."

=== Relationship with Kevin ===
After the revelation of learning Sharon was her mother, Mariah grows closer to Kevin Fisher (Greg Rikaart) who is also going through a rough patch. Grimes noted that Mariah is "figuring out where she stands in this new city, with this new family, having had the rug pulled out from under her about what she thought she knew about her past", describing her as being in a phase of "soul searching". The actress enjoys working with Rikaart, as they play "into a very real element" from both of their real personalities. She compared the characters of Kevin and Mariah, noting that they both "have a checkered past but good hearts". Grimes, who felt as if the series didn't know what to do with Mariah after revealing her as Cassie's twin, credited Mariah's longevity on the series to her relationship with Kevin. She said: "...that gave me a chance to do comedy (...) Comedy didn’t come naturally to me, and a lot of what I learned, I learned from Greg."

=== Relationship with Tessa and sexuality ===
"It existed without labels. I really appreciated that at a time where labels could be so restrictive for some people. It just felt like a really genuine, authentic story about two individuals falling for each other, no matter the circumstances."

— Grimes on Mariah and Tessa's relationship (2021)

Upon learning from one of her co-stars that the writers were planning to make a character gay, Grimes recalled: "immediately, in my head, I went, 'It's going to be me.'" In August 2017, Mariah shares a kiss with Tessa Porter (Cait Fairbanks) in the midst of dating Devon Hamilton (Bryton James), while Tessa is involved with Mariah's brother, Noah. Despite their circumstances, the women realize they share a "powerful connection" with each other. The build-up of their attraction had previously consisted of "longing looks, meaningful pauses and a tender touch here and there". A same-sex relationship between Mariah and a new character named Tessa was one of the stories then-head writer and executive producer Sally Sussman Morina had pitched to CBS after being hired in September 2016. However, Sussman Morina did not consider it a "gay story", noting: "This is a love story; it's not a gay story. It's about falling in love with a person, not a gender. It is about Mariah and Tessa's self-discovery and it catches them both off guard. People fall in love unexpectedly for all sorts of reasons. Some they understand; some they don't." The network "enthusiastically approved" of the story, with Sussman Morina saying: "I think they saw the value and the freshness in the way it would be told. They did however note that they have a very conservative audience and this story may offend some people. CBS knows their audience very well, which could be the reason Y&R never did a story like this before, except in the early 70's when Bill Bell tried it and it was very negatively received." Mariah and Tessa's kiss marked the first time The Young and the Restless had delved into a relationship between two major characters of the same gender. Both women appear to be in denial about their feelings and become desperate to make their relationships with Devon and Noah work. After kissing Tessa, Mariah tells Devon that she loves him, although he does not say he loves her back. Mariah confides in Kevin about her feelings for Tessa, confessing that it's the deepest thing she has felt for anyone.

While it was speculated that the series had been "backing away" from Mariah and Tessa's romance, it ultimately received more focus in 2018. Grimes believed that it was always the writers' intention to revisit the couple, observing: "So much happened between Noah, Mariah, and Tessa that you couldn’t just jump into a relationship after all of that went down and she stole the notebook. There had to be a build." Due to same-sex relationships being "uncharted territory" on The Young and the Restless, Grimes also felt that this slow pacing was necessary; "you gotta take your time and do it right," she said.

== Storylines ==
Early Deception (2014–2015):

Mariah Copeland, portrayed by Camryn Grimes, made her debut on The Young and the Restless in January 2014. Initially introduced as a mysterious woman bearing a striking resemblance to Sharon Newman's late daughter, Cassie, Mariah's true identity was soon revealed. She was, in fact, Cassie's twin sister, separated at birth due to a conspiracy involving cult leader Ian Ward. Victor Newman orchestrated Mariah's appearance in Genoa City to manipulate Sharon and keep her away from his son, Nick. Over time, Mariah integrated into the Newman family, forming complex relationships with Sharon, Nick, and others.

Relationships and Personal Growth (2016–2021):

In 2016, Mariah's character underwent significant development. She began a romantic relationship with Tessa Porter, marking a milestone as one of the show's first same-sex couples. Their relationship faced challenges, including Mariah's struggles with her past and Tessa's own issues. Despite these obstacles, the couple grew closer, and in 2021, Mariah agreed to be a surrogate for Abby Newman and Chance Chancellor, carrying their child to term. Tragically, during the surrogacy, Mariah was kidnapped, leading to a harrowing ordeal before her eventual rescue.

Recent Developments (2025):

As of September 2025, Mariah's storyline has taken a darker turn. After returning from a business trip, she confided in her wife, Tessa, revealing that she had attempted to kill a man during her absence. This revelation shocked Tessa and strained their relationship. Mariah explained that the incident was linked to her past involvement with Ian Ward's cult, suggesting that the trauma from her past had resurfaced. She also disclosed that her therapist had recommended a program in Boston to address her mental health issues.

In the aftermath of this confession, Mariah's behavior became more erratic. She received a mysterious blackmail message from Lauren Fenmore, indicating that Lauren was aware of her secret and threatening to expose it. This development has added a layer of suspense to her storyline, as viewers are left wondering why Lauren is behind the blackmail and what her motives are.

Family Dynamics and Future Prospects:

Mariah's relationship with Tessa and their adopted daughter, Aria, is currently in jeopardy. Tessa has been spending more time with Daniel Romalotti Jr., leading to speculation about a potential romantic involvement. Meanwhile, Mariah is grappling with her past actions and the consequences they may have on her family. The upcoming episodes promise to delve deeper into Mariah's psyche and the impact of her past on her present relationships.

== Reception ==
On-Air On-Soaps lauded the Grimes performance when she learned that Sharon was her mother, naming hers the "Power Performance of the Week". "Through all these emotional scenes it was Camryn Grimes who made the story plausible with her top-notch acting as she went from hurt, to angry, to betrayal, to disbelief, to completely lost, while the whole time keeping the character's harder edges." In the "Best and Worst of 2014" issue of Soaps in Depth, the magazine wrote of Grimes' return: "Sure, Mariah's storyline hasn't always made a ton of sense — Tyler's stalker sure chased him for a long time to give up on him so fast! But it's still great to have Cassie's former portrayer back in the fold." Soaps in Depth also praised Mariah's snark, including it on a list of "5 Things We're Loving Right Now" in March 2015. When referencing Mariah's attempt to seduce Nick, Aaron Hagey-MacKay of Global TV wrote: "Some people are just bad!"

=== Mariah and Tessa ===
Mariah and Tessa's kiss in August 2017 generated polarized reactions from viewers. While the soap opera had been criticized by journalists and fans of the genre for its reluctance to write LGBT stories, the storyline proved controversial with fans. Having been away from the daytime genre for a decade (a period in which other soap operas had featured LGBT characters), Sally Sussman Morina was "taken aback" by the negativity surrounding the kiss. However, it also received positive feedback on social media; Grimes responded to these reactions by writing: "Your strength is power, progress, and potential." Supporters of the couple dubbed them "Teriah". Michael Logan of TV Insider reported that network executives were "super skittish" about the storyline, and that there was a gag order banning Grimes and her co-stars from discussing it with the press. Logan posed the question, "Will a new day finally dawn in Genoa City?", observing that "there’s no getting around the fact that Y&R—the only current daytime soap without any out and proud LGBTQ characters—has been historically phobic when it comes to same-sex amour". Jeremy Helligar of HuffPost praised the show's depiction of Mariah and Tessa's feelings for one another as "just two women falling for each other and attempting to make sense of it without putting a label on it." Helligar remarked that "gender almost seems to be an afterthought" in the storyline, "It’s backing up an assertion some of us have been making forever: Two men or two women fall in love the same way a man and a woman do. Love is neither 'gay' nor 'straight.' Love is love, regardless of the gender(s) or sexual orientation of the people falling into it." Likewise, Helligar praised The Young and the Restless for not making race an issue in Mariah's relationship with Devon. In 2021, Lynette Rice of Entertainment Weekly—who observed Mariah and Tessa to be the only "full-time, same-sex couple in daytime right now"—highlighted viewers' appreciation of "how organically the relationship developed. There was no coming out story; instead, it followed two women who happened to fall in love."

The storyline earned Grimes her second Daytime Emmy Award, winning for Outstanding Supporting Actress in a Drama Series in April 2018. Grimes had submitted the scenes where Mariah confides in Sharon about her feelings for Tessa. The actress dedicated her acceptance speech to "everyone who dares to love truthfully". In August 2018, Grimes elaborated on receiving online backlash as a result of Mariah and Tessa's relationship, stating:

"I’ve gotten over clapping back to everything because I realize it’s just not the important conversation. The important conversation is something we’re already doing. We’re continuing this story. It’s happening and those people who don’t agree, I’m sorry, but they’re just going to kind of go away eventually. It’s an old mentality that I think will die out."
