= Isabella Braña =

Fictional character from the American CBS soap opera The Young and the Restless

- The Young and the Restless character
- Portrayed by: Eva Longoria (2001–03); Uncredited actress (2012)
- Duration: 2001–03, 2012
- First appearance: March 8, 2001
- Last appearance: July 2, 2012
- Created by: Kay Alden, Trent Jones
- Introduced by: Edward J. Scott
In-universe information
- Father: Ricardo Braña
- Mother: Trinidad Braña
- Husband: James Franklin (1999–2000); Paul Williams (2002–03)
- Sons: Ricky Williams
- Uncles: Juan
- Aunts: Marta

Isabella Braña is a fictional character from the American CBS Daytime soap opera The Young and the Restless. She was portrayed by Eva Longoria, created by Kay Alden and introduced by former executive producer Edward J. Scott on March 8, 2001. During her run, the character gave birth to Paul Williams' (Doug Davidson) son and later tried to kill his ex-wife, Christine Blair (Lauralee Bell). Described as "crazy", "evil" and a "whack job", Longoria said the character was a challenge to portray. The actress was let go and Longoria last aired on August 15, 2003.

== Casting ==
Eva Longoria began portraying the role during the episode dated March 8, 2001, on a contract status. The role was introduced when regular Christine Blair (Lauralee Bell) was written out of the series due to her pregnancy, and Longoria was brought to fill her position. Longoria had previously appeared on the soap operas The Bold and the Beautiful and General Hospital. In June 2003, it was announced that along with two other actors, Longoria would be leaving The Young and the Restless in what was called a "shocking plot twist". Isabella last aired on August 15, 2003. Flashbacks of Longoria's scenes as Isabella were shown on November 9, 2011. On July 2, 2012, the character briefly reappeared, however not portrayed by Longoria, but by an unidentified actress whose face was never shown.

== Character development ==
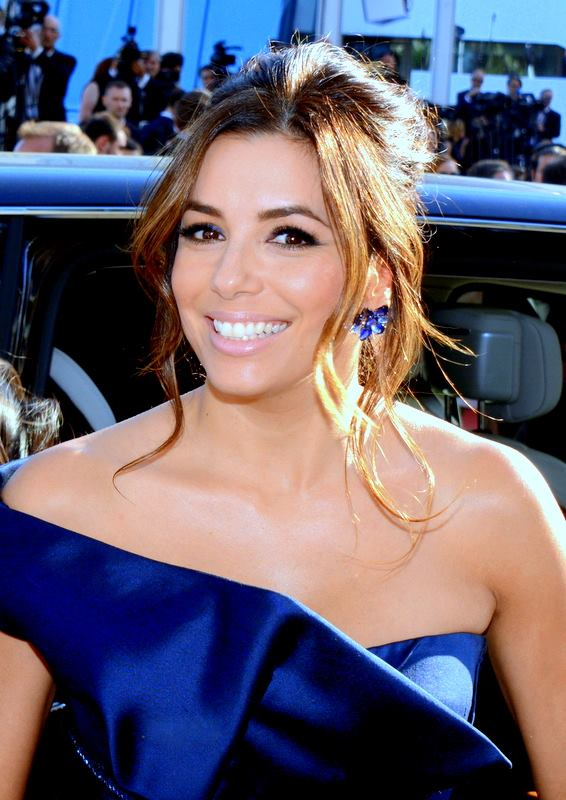
Eva Longoria stated the character was a challenge to portray.

Isabella was a mentally ill woman who had an affair with Christine Blair's (Lauralee Bell) husband Paul Williams (Doug Davidson), resulting in the birth of their son Ricky Williams. The character was penned by Michael Logan of TV Guide as a "nutjob" who made Christine's life a "living hell". Additionally, Isabella has been characterized as "crazy", with the National Post calling her "evil". A year after her departure from the series, Longoria reflected on her past roles, and said: "I feel like I've been very lucky in the roles I've played [...] Isabella, for example, was so complex, so full of anger and love at the same time." Longoria said that she was "a challenge to play".

In 2011, the child Isabella and Paul had, Ricky Williams was re-introduced to the series as an adult, now portrayed by Pete Porte. The role had been dramatically rapidly aged over the duration of 8 years to an adult. Adam Hughes of Yahoo! stated that bringing the character back would work well, he wrote: "Regardless of his initial motivation for heading back to Wisconsin, Ricky will undoubtedly open up many old wounds and many new story line possibilities. Will he angrily confront Paul? Will Isabella manage to return home, as well, to see her big boy?" Doug Davidson stated that Paul harbored possible guilt in regards to Ricky's upbringing, having been raised by his grandparents. Lauralee Bell spoke about the love triangle between Paul, Christine and Isabella and what kind of twists would occur through Ricky returning. She said: "That whole Isabella thing was a very scary time for Chris and Paul and now they wonder if there's something off about Ricky. At first, no one knew Isabella was crazy. He could be a whack job like his mother. Time will tell. But seeing Ricky for the first time as a man is really startling for Chris. And for me, too." Ultimately, Ricky turned out to be psychotic like his mother and was killed by his own father Paul to prevent him from killing Eden Baldwin (Jessica Heap).

== Storylines ==
Isabella came to Genoa City to distract Paul Williams as a favor to Michael Baldwin (Christian LeBlanc), who wanted to break up Paul and his wife, Christine. Isabella approached Paul at his office with a case against her husband, which he took. Paul gave Isabella shelter, and the two were drawn to each other. Upon the ending of the case, Isabella's past as a call girl came out, but Paul forgave Isabella for lying, and they became even closer. Isabella was keen on leaving the city after the case was over, but both Michael and Paul had their reasons for keeping her in town. Isabella was surprised to learn that she was pregnant with Paul's child. Paul's marriage took another hit when Christine returned home to find him passionately kissing Isabella. However, Isabella didn't want Paul, and she decided to tell Michael that she was carrying his child after a night of passion that they had. Michael reluctantly agreed to pay for her expenses and went along with all of her demands, while Paul became closer to his ex-wife, Lauren Fenmore (Tracey E. Bregman). Paul found out that he was the father of Isabella's child and decided to raise his son with her. Both Michael and Mary Williams (Carolyn Conwell), Paul's mother, were not happy to learn the truth. Mary did her best to break up the couple, and Paul eventually realized that he couldn't be one happy family with Isabella and their baby.

After giving birth to their son, Ricky Williams, Isabella was convinced that her life would get better. Isabella was suspicious of a woman named Kelly Simmons that tried to investigate her, without realizing it was Christine in disguise. Paul decided to go back to Isabella and was even ready to move away with her. Christine found out about Michael's plot with Isabella and told everything to Paul. The couple reunited, and an unhappy Isabella decided to have her revenge. She made it seem like Christine had murdered her and, at the same time, she was plotting her next move. While everyone thought she was dead, Isabella confronted Christine in a bathtub after drugging her. Isabella was about to kill Christine when Paul arrived to stop her in time. Christine and Paul reunited but were unaware that Isabella was still alive. Michael came just in time to save Christine's and Paul's lives and Isabella was committed to a psychiatric hospital in Los Angeles.

Isabella's parents started raising Ricky and took him to see his mentally ill mother from time to time until she checked out completely from reality and started becoming violent. Ricky suffered from this experience and also felt abandoned by his father. When Ricky returned to Genoa City nine years later and grown up, Paul and Christine recalled all that Isabella had done. Paul then went to see Isabella following Ricky's tragic death, in which Paul shot him to stop him from killing Eden Baldwin (Jessica Heap). However, Isabella's face was not shown and she was only seen brushing her hair while humming from the back.

== Reception ==
For her portrayal, Longoria received an ALMA Award nomination for Outstanding Actress in a Daytime Drama in 2002. The actress became popular with viewers. In 2012, much speculation occurred whether Longoria would return to the series following flashbacks and a brief appearance showing Isabella from behind, portrayed by an unidentified actress. Dave Masko of Huliq noted that soap operas are suffering according to The New York Times, which reported that "things are not looking good for the soap opera". Masko said that The Young and the Restless suffered at the Daytime Emmy Awards in 2012 and bringing Longoria back could be "opening the door" for "Y&R to do something desperate to both boost ratings and become a contender again for the Daytime Emmy’s that it won in spades back in the day when this soap was the top dog on daytime TV".
