= Daisy Carter =

- The Young and the Restless character
- Portrayed by: Yvonne Zima
- Duration: 2009–12
- First appearance: October 30, 2009
- Last appearance: September 28, 2012
- Created by: Maria Arena Bell, Hogan Sheffer and Scott Hamner
- Introduced by: Maria Arena Bell and Paul Rauch
In-universe information
- Other names: Daisy Thompkins; Scarlett; Daisy Sanders; Daisy Romalotti
- Father: Tom Fisher
- Mother: Sheila Carter
- Brothers: Ryder Callahan
- Half-brothers: Kevin Fisher; John Finnegan
- Half-sisters: Mary Warwick; Diana Carter
- Husband: Daniel Romalotti (2012)
- Daughters: Lucy Romalotti
- Grandmothers: Molly Carter
- Aunts: Sarah Smythe
- Nephews: Hayes Forrester Finnegan
- Nieces: Luna Nozawa

Daisy Carter is a fictional character from the American CBS soap opera The Young and the Restless. Created and introduced by former head writer Maria Arena Bell, the character was portrayed by Yvonne Zima. She debuted during the episode airing on October 30, 2009, under an alias, later revealed to be the daughter of Sheila Carter (Kimberlin Brown) and Tom Fisher (Roscoe Born). Bell created Daisy and stated Sheila was back in a new form. Daisy later raped Daniel Romalotti (Michael Graziadei), drugging him to believe he was sleeping with his then wife Amber Moore. She became pregnant with his child, and gave birth to a girl, Lucy, in 2011. However, she later abandoned her in a church and the child was placed in an illegal adoption ring. After Daisy was sent to prison for her actions, Daniel's mother Phyllis Summers (Michelle Stafford) gained custody of Lucy after Daniel gave up his parental rights. In 2012, Daisy was released from prison by Avery Bailey Clark (Jessica Collins) and reclaimed her daughter, later earning full custody. Daniel then married Daisy to be close to his child, and after Daisy went missing, Daniel has been raising Lucy. Despite a brief stint in a psychiatric hospital, Daisy's whereabouts are still unknown.

In May 2012, it was announced that Zima had been permanently let go from the role after three years, with her last appearance on June 25, 2012, when Daisy went missing. Within three months, reports announced that Zima would reprise the role, which occurred from September 6 to 28, 2012.

== Storylines ==
The character is first introduced as Daisy Thompkins (later Sanders), a new friend of Abby Newman (then Hayley Erin). She works at Fenmore's boutique and lives in the dorms at her high school. She and her brother, Ryder Callahan (Wilson Bethel) arrive in Genoa City to get revenge against Lauren Fenmore (Tracey E. Bregman) for killing their mother, Sheila Carter (Kimberlin Brown). They work with their aunt Sarah Smythe, Sheila's sister, to commit a series of crimes and ultimately kidnap Lauren and Jana Hawkes (Emily O'Brien), their brother Kevin Fisher's (Greg Rikaart) wife. Lauren and Jana are later rescued by Kevin and Michael Baldwin (Christian LeBlanc).

Daisy then found herself attracted to Daniel Romalotti (Michael Graziadei), who at the time was married to Amber Moore (Adrienne Frantz). After drugging him, she rapes an unconscious Daniel, mirroring what her mother did with Lauren's first husband. Afterward, Daisy and Ryder left town, but she promised to return someday. While Ryder and Daisy both blame Lauren for their mother's death, they do not seem to realize that their half-sister, Mary, cut Shelia out of her life because of what she was. Daisy later returned to Genoa City on Halloween, unnoticed by anyone (except Lauren, who came to the conclusion that she was hallucinating). Daisy goes to Daniel's apartment and tells him that she is pregnant with his child. It was revealed that the baby was conceived through her raping him and later a paternity test proved that Daniel fathered the child. Daisy was sent to jail, and later left in Daniel's mother, Phyllis Summers' custody as Phyllis wanted to protect her unborn grandchild. Daisy also stayed briefly at Daniel's apartment, and later gave birth on New Year's Eve with Jana at her side. She was later found in labor on the side of the road by Daniel, who delivered their child. She knocked him unconscious on the head afterwards, when he rejected her advances of wanting a "happy family". She then left her daughter at a church. A couple found her and sold her away. Daisy returned months later. It was revealed that the child which Billy Abbott and Victoria Newman were raising, Lucy, was Daisy's child prior to this. Her return consisted of solely claims to regain a life with her daughter. Phyllis promised her multiple things in order to do what she wanted, however Daisy never acquired what she was looking for. Avery Bailey Clark later stepped in as her lawyer for revenge on her sister Phyllis, and Daisy was released.

After her release from prison, Daisy regained custody of Lucy from Phyllis. In an attempt to keep his daughter safe, Daniel had his parental rights restored. He fought for custody of Lucy, but lost to Daisy and must wait six months before he can try for custody again. Afraid for his daughter's safety, Daniel proposed to Daisy, and the two eloped. Although Daisy got what she wanted, Daniel refused to ever really love her. When Phyllis refused to allow Daisy to attend her wedding, Daisy heartlessly walked out as Phyllis miscarried. Angered by Phyllis and Daniel's continuing rejection, Daisy has teamed up with Ricky Williams to bring down Phyllis and see her suffer. Daisy has also conned Kevin into believing she's the innocent victim, and that she's really changed. Kevin gave her job at Crimson Lights, much to everyone else's dismay. Phyllis and Daniel discovered that Daisy walked away when Phyllis was miscarrying, but she claimed she paused for a few moments to think about apologizing which is not true. Avery then teamed up with Heather Stevens to arrest Daisy for not helping Phyllis when she was miscarrying.

Daisy blackmailed Phyllis to treat her nicely, or she reveal that Phyllis hit Paul Williams (Doug Davidson) and Christine Blair (Lauralee Bell) with a car eighteen years prior. Daisy also blackmailed Ricky to help her and Lucy to leave Genoa City, or she reveal that he is spying on Heather's apartment with cameras. Ricky agree to help her, but Daisy saw a video on Ricky's laptop of him murdering his ex-girlfriend Rachel Dalton, and she decided to tell Michael about that. When Michael told Phyllis and Daniel that Daisy wanted to see him, Phyllis assumed it was to tell him about the hit-and-run incident that she did to Paul and Christine. Ricky found out that Daisy saw the video, and he went to see her in the alleyway where she was supposed to meet Michael, and he saying to her that he was about to make her disappear. When Daniel discovered that Daisy had gone missing, he and Phyllis assumed she went on the run to avoid the arrest. Daniel became the prime suspect in her disappearance, which deepened when it was revealed that Daisy's credit card had been in use near Canada, when in fact Ricky had been using the card to frame Daniel, who was about to be released when the police found an email Daisy wrote to Kevin, saying that she knew Daniel hated her and that she was afraid. This led to Michael realizing that in fact all evidence was pointing to Daniel. At the same time, Eden Baldwin (Jessica Heap), Ricky's former roommate, was adamant that Ricky was involved in Daisy's disappearance, and she found Daisy's wallet and cell phone in Ricky's hotel room, meaning she was right about his involvement. However, Ricky tried to kill Eden when he found out and she hit her head on a bathtub and passed out. Paul arrives and he shoots Ricky to stop him from killing Eden and Ricky dies.

Three months later, while Sharon Newman (Sharon Case) was checking into Fairview psychiatric hospital, a woman called her name in the waiting room: Daisy. Sharon explained that everyone in Genoa City believed that she was dead, and Daisy revealed that after Ricky threatened to make her disappear, she ran away and checked into Fairview under an alias, Scarlett, as she was terrified that Ricky would kill her as he did Rachel. Daisy was unaware of Ricky's death, and tried to convince the doctors to release her, which they refused to do without legal proof of her true identity. Daisy then decided to overdose on pills she had been harboring with hopes of landing in the hospital where she could then escape. After she did so, the doctors received the results of her fingerprint scan, and Ronan Malloy (Jeff Branson) got a call about Daisy's whereabouts. Yet, just as Michael secured a court order to question Daisy, she disappeared. A woman claiming to be Daisy's mother checked her out of a mental institution, signing the name "Sheila Carter" on the release form. Michael had the signature analyzed to see if it fit Sheila's handwriting, and results turned out to be inconclusive. The doctor who released Daisy was unable to identify the woman claiming to be Daisy's mother as his glasses were broken when Daisy was signed out. Paul got a hold of the security footage of the woman who checked Daisy out but unfortunately, the woman was wearing a head scarf and big sunglasses making her face unidentifiable. In June 2017, Sheila Carter reappears in Los Angeles, revealing herself to Quinn Fuller. This reveals that Sheila is still alive, and is probably the one who took Daisy from the hospital. In February 2023, Lucy, now a teenager returns to Genoa City.

== Reception ==
TV Guide Canada listed Zima's appearance as Daisy in 2010 as the "worst comeback" of a character. Chris Eades from Soaps In Depth called Daisy a "troubled young woman." In 2021, Richard Simms from Soaps She Knows put Daisy on his list of the most hated soap opera characters, commenting that she "most definitely wasn't as popular — even in a love-to-hate-her way" as Sheila, and that it was odd that Sheila had not mentioned Daisy in her stint. In 2023, Dan from Endante.com referred to the mysterious disappearance of Daisy Carter on ‘The Young and the Restless’ “a captivating storyline that kept viewers hooked.” He also wrote: “Daisy’s complex character and enigmatic nature made her a fan favorite, and her sudden vanishing act left fans speculating about her fate. The impact of her disappearance was felt throughout the show, forcing characters to confront their past actions and viewers to eagerly await her return.”
