= Paul Williams (The Young and the Restless) =

- The Young and the Restless character
- Portrayed by: Doug Davidson
- Duration: 1978–2020
- First appearance: May 23, 1978
- Last appearance: November 19, 2020
- Introduced by: William J. Bell
In-universe information
- Occupation: Genoa City chief of police
- Parents: Carl Williams; Mary Williams
- Siblings: Todd Williams; Steven Williams; Patty Williams
- Spouse: April Stevens (1981); Lauren Fenmore (1984–86); Christine Blair (1996–2002, 2013–2023); Isabella Braña (2002–2003)
- Children: Dylan McAvoy; Heather Stevens; Ricky Williams

Paul Williams is a fictional character on the American CBS soap opera The Young and the Restless. Paul was introduced to the show on May 23, 1978, and has been portrayed by Doug Davidson until 2020. Initially, Paul was a "bad boy", who had a romance with Nikki Reed (Melody Thomas Scott), giving her an STD. The relationship ended, but the two have remained friends since. After a year on the series, Bell gave the character a proper backstory, surname and family. This included his notoriously unstable sister Patty Williams (most recently Stacy Haiduk). After a failed marriage to April Stevens (Cynthia Eilbacher)—who gave birth to his daughter Heather Stevens (Jennifer Landon)—focus turned towards Paul's career as a private investigator, as well as his relationship and eventual marriage to and later divorce from Lauren Fenmore (Tracey Bregman). Paul's string of unsuccessful romances with women—including his ill-fated bride Cindy Lake (DeAnna Robbins), and Cassandra Rawlins (Nina Arvesen), the wife of one of his clients—continued. Over the years, Paul continued to become heavily involved in various storylines as a private investigator.

The character's most prominent love story occurred when he married attorney Christine Blair (Lauralee Bell). The couple faced various challenges together, with their first marriage ending as a result of his affair with the psychotic Isabella Braña (Eva Longoria). The affair produced Paul's son Ricky Williams (Peter Porte); Isabella was admitted to a mental institution and Ricky grew up away from his father. Years later, Paul established a relationship with his daughter Heather, who returned to Genoa City (now an adult) as a lawyer. After years away, Paul's adult son Ricky returned to town and it was revealed that he, like his mother, was mentally unstable. In a controversial storyline, Paul was forced to shoot and kill Ricky to prevent him from killing Eden Baldwin (Jessica Heap). Paul has since assumed the role of police chief for the Genoa City Police Department and remarried Christine.

Davidson's performance of Paul has garnered him acclaim from both critics and audiences, and he has emerged as one of the soap opera genre's most popular actors. Davidson's high Q Score has allowed him to be recognized as daytime's most desirable performer; although TV Guide has labelled him "underrated". Similarly, Canyon News described his performance as "understated", yet "overpowering" and "strong". TVSource magazine stated that the actor has maintained "raw honesty and conviction" in his portrayal. The storyline in which Paul was forced to kill his son earned Davidson a Daytime Emmy Award for Outstanding Lead Actor in a Drama Series, having previously been nominated for this award twice. Additionally, Davidson has claimed three Soap Opera Digest Awards from six nominations.

== Casting ==
Doug Davidson joined the cast of the show on May 15, 1978; the episode aired on May 23, 1978. Its creator, William J. Bell, discovered him during one of Bell's trips to Chicago, while Davidson was modelling for magazines. The actor learned that he had been cast as Paul when a costumer contacted him for measurements. Before joining the soap opera Davidson studied marine biology, abandoning his studies to pursue acting full-time. Former executive producer Wes Kenny had a profound impact on his career: "Wes taught me to listen, respond and to play the situation". In mid-1979 Davidson signed a five-year contract, and began receiving more airtime. In September 1994 he was hired to host The New Price Is Right, which taped down the hall from The Young and the Restless at CBS Television City.

By May 2002, the actor had appeared in over 3,600 episodes of the daytime drama. Reflecting on the "unique demands" of the soap-opera genre, Davidson said: "You must see each day as fresh, but it's also dangerous to invest too much because you do have to come back tomorrow. It's not the Super Bowl every day." In September 2018, Davidson was bumped to recurring status. Davidson hasn’t appeared on Y&R since November 19, 2020.

== Storylines ==
The character Paul Williams was born in May 1960, the son of police detective Carl Williams (Brett Hadley) and Mary Williams (Carolyn Conwell). He has three siblings: Todd, Steven and Patty.

Paul begins dating close friend, Nikki Reed (Melody Thomas Scott), giving her a sexually transmitted disease. The romance ends when she takes up with Greg Foster (Wings Hauser); Paul begins dating April Stevens (Cynthia Eilbacher), who gives birth to his daughter Heather (Eden Riegel) despite his desire for her to terminate the pregnancy. He leaves town with Nikki to join a cult, the New World Commune. Paul's brother, Steven, helps to save them from the cult and rescues the former lovers. While Paul and Nikki are away, Greg dates April. However, April falls ill and Greg convinces Paul to marry her. The ill-conceived marriage ends in divorce; Paul focuses on his detective career, unsuccessfully trying to find his mentally unstable sister Patty (Stacy Haiduk). While Paul and business partner Andy Richards (Steven Ford) work undercover to infiltrate organized crime, he dates prostitute Cindy Lake. Cindy takes a bullet for Paul, dying in his arms. His mother opposes his relationship with Cindy, and also disapproves Paul's marriage to Lauren Fenmore (Tracey Bregman). Their union suffers when she is stalked by Shawn Garrett (Grant Cramer), who convinces Paul that Shawn and Lauren had an affair. The marriage ends, although Paul comes to her rescue when Lauren is kidnapped and buried alive by Shawn. Pregnant, Lauren has a miscarriage. She and Paul reconcile, although when Lauren submits a nude photo of Paul for a magazine centerfold they break up permanently.

Paul becomes involved with his friend George Rawlins' (Jonathon Farwell) wife Cassandra (Nina Arvesen), unaware of the marriage. Cassandra's announcement that she is filing for divorce causes George to have a heart attack, and he becomes terminally ill. He learns about the affair, planning to kill himself and frame Paul for his murder. Paul fakes his own suicide and goes into hiding; he, his father and Victor Newman (Eric Braeden) work to clear Paul's name. George's killer is Adrian, Cassandra's lover from Bermuda. She marries Brad Carlton (Don Diamont), who leaves her after learning that she drugged him. Cassandra tries to reconcile with Paul, but she dies in a car crash. After dating his secretary Lynne Bassett (Laura Bryan Birn), Paul falls in love with his partner Christine Blair (Lauralee Bell). After his mother declares his father Carl dead, Christine discovers that he is an amnesiac living in Norfolk. She brings Carl to town to see Paul, although he remembers little. Despite Mary wanting him back, Carl does not remember anything and returns to Norfolk. After Christine's marriage to Danny Romalotti (Michael Damian) ends, Paul and Christine begin a relationship. April, married to Robert Lynch, returns to town with Paul's daughter Heather. Lynch abuses April, and she stabs him. She is arrested, and Christine is her legal representative. April is acquitted, and returns to New York with Heather.

Christine still loves Danny; his mistress Phyllis Summers (Michelle Stafford) faked her son Daniel Romalotti's (Michael Graziadei) paternity, and he is not Danny's biological child. However, Christine and Paul continue their wedding plans. A crazed Phyllis believes that Christine will try to reconcile with Danny. The night before the wedding Phyllis crashes her car into Christine and Paul, postponing the marriage. Christine and Danny briefly reconcile before she returns to Paul, whom she marries shortly thereafter. She begins a law practice with Michael Baldwin (Christian LeBlanc), who try to rape her years ago, which requires her to spend months out of town working on cases in Hong Kong and Australia. Paul begins an affair with a client, Isabella Braña (Eva Longoria), who previously dated Michael. Christine finds out and divorces Paul after a six-year marriage. Isabella becomes pregnant; she does not tell Paul because of his feelings for Christine, telling Michael that he is the father. She and Michael begin a relationship, and reconciles with his ex-wife Lauren. When Paul learns about Isabella's baby he moves in with her, and they eventually marry despite Mary's opposition. She gives birth to their son, Ricky Williams (Peter Porte). However, when Christine and Michael become engaged Paul recognizes his feelings for her and wants to reconcile. He assaults her sexually, and she leaves town. Christine returns in disguise, and works with Mary to expose Isabella as manipulative and scheming. Christine and Michael's engagement ends when he tells her he set up Isabella and Paul so he could have Christine for himself, and she and Paul reconcile. An unstable Isabella tries to frame Christine for her own murder, and later tries to drown Christine in her bathtub. Paul rescues Christine, Isabella is institutionalized and Ricky is sent to live with her parents. Paul and Christine's relationship again ends.

Paul closes his investigative company and begins a partnership with Christine, hiring fledgling PI J.T. Hellstrom (Thad Luckinbill) as an apprentice. He continues detective work, rescuing J.T. and Sharon Newman (Sharon Case) when they are kidnapped by the attempted murderers of Brad's family decades earlier (when he was known by his birth name, George Kaplan). Paul investigates Lauren's enemy Sheila Carter (Kimberlin Brown), who had plastic surgery to look like Phyllis (Lauren's best friend) and scheme her way into Lauren's life. Paul captures Sheila, locking her in a warehouse cage, and begins dating detective Maggie Sullivan (Tammy Lauren). Sheila escapes, shoots Maggie (leaving her locked in the cage with Paul) and goes on a rampage, kidnapping Lauren, Phyllis and their children until she is shot and killed by Lauren. Maggie agrees not to tell the authorities about Paul (and eventually Michael), keeping Sheila trapped. Paul's daughter Heather (Vail Bloom) returns to Genoa City as an assistant district attorney, and develops a relationship with her father.

He reconciles with first love Nikki, and they become engaged. She then breaks up with Paul, unable to move past her feelings for ex-husband Victor. Paul investigates a businesswoman, Mary Jane Benson, only to discover that she is his unstable sister Patty. Patty goes on a crime spree, poisoning Nikki and Victor's granddaughter Summer Newman (Haley King), kidnapping Colleen Carlton (Tammin Sursok)—who eventually drowns—and shooting Victor three times before escaping. Paul tracks down Nikki, and brings her back to town to help Victor recover.

Patty is found and sent to a mental institution, where Paul visits her regularly. He begins dating Christine's former best friend, Nina Webster (Tricia Cast). A love triangle forms between Paul, Nina and Christine when the latter briefly returns to Genoa City, and Paul helps Nina track down her long-lost son Ronan Malloy (Jeff Branson). Paul's son Ricky (now an adult) returns to Genoa City, working for attorney Avery Bailey Clark (Jessica Collins). Paul attempts to bond with Ricky, but soon discovers that Ricky is psychotic like Isabella. Paul is forced to shoot and kill Ricky to keep him from killing Eden Baldwin (Jessica Heap). Before dying, Ricky confesses that he murdered his ex-girlfriend Rachel when she dumped him. Paul surrenders to the police, and is shocked when no knife (with which Ricky threatened Eden) is found at the scene and Eden has no memory of the event. Christine returns to town, and with her and Heather's help Paul is acquitted. Months later he becomes the Genoa City police chief, remaining involved in a number of legal cases. Eleven years after their divorce, Christine and Paul remarry at their friend Katherine Chancellor's (Jeanne Cooper) funeral, with Paul following Katherine's advice in a letter he received during the ceremony.

== Character development ==
=== Portrayal ===
I think at this juncture, it’s hard to separate. Pretty much my entire adult life I spent on this show, and from arriving at my early 20s and until now, there is a separation between Paul and Doug, but it’s pretty blurred. There’s certain things that I just innately know, like how he’d react to things. It’s hard to, after so many years, it’s truly hard to separate the two.

— Davidson, on distinguishing himself from Paul

Global Regina describes Paul, a detective, as always doing "his best to see that justice is done". CBS created him as a "charismatic" private investigator who was compassionate and attractive. Canyon News described Paul as a "sexy private eye who many Genoa City citizens have called upon to save their lives and their companies". Bell had introduced Paul as a "bad boy" who would be a rival for Nikki Reed's (Melody Thomas Scott) affections (which he won), and "too green to know anything". Only after an estimated 450 episodes, according to The Age, was Paul given a surname, family and backstory. Davidson said: "Bill brought in my family and the show went to an hour and that was a huge transition for my character". In 1989, he described coping with the ever-changing storylines as "mental": "Just when you think you know everything ...you get fooled by complacency. I've been playing Paul Williams for a long time and I have to keep my performance fresh and new". In an interview with The Gadsden Times, the actor said he treats himself as an "open vessel" and has a "childlike frame of mind" when undertaking a variety of storylines.

=== Relationships ===
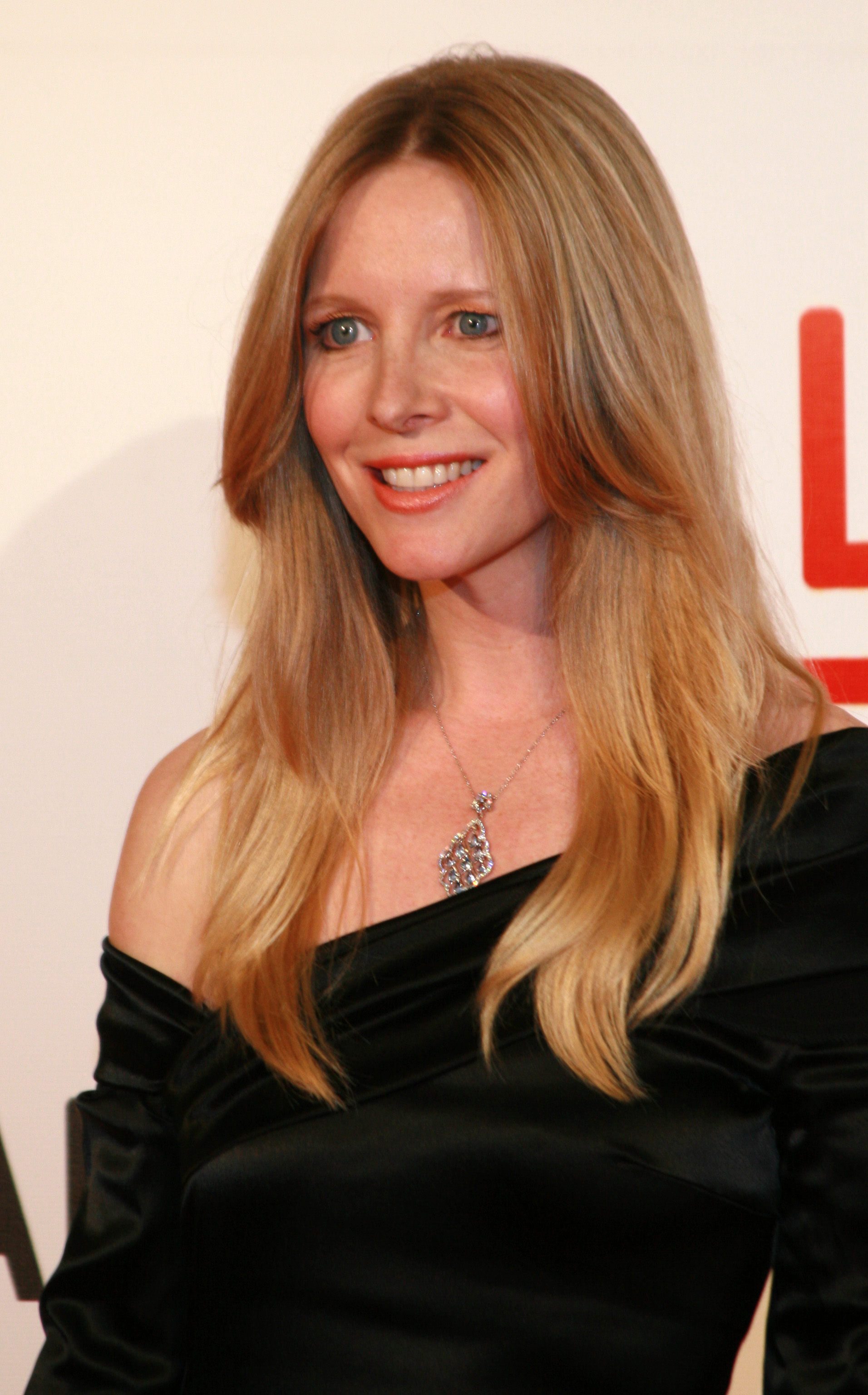
Lauralee Bell plays Christine Blair, one of Paul's main love interests.

Paul has had several unsuccessful relationships, and has been described as "often luckless in love". His main love interest during the 1980s was Lauren Fenmore (Tracey Bregman). Davidson described the relationship as Paul's "first non-drama fling" and said that Bell decided to pair the characters on the "spur of the moment", uncertain of the outcome. He enjoys the dynamics between Lauren and Paul: "I always am excited whenever I get to work with her. We’ve played friends, husband and wife, enemies, you name it. She is a dynamic actress and a wonderful friend and person". The couple have faced a number of challenges, including Lauren's crazed stalker Shawn Garrett (Grant Cramer) and disapproval from Paul's mother, Mary Williams (Carolyn Conwell). Lauren and Paul divorced: Lynda Hirsch of the Sun Sentinel wrote, "The marriage didn't work out, since Lauren desperately wanted a career in music and Paul wanted her to be a stay-at-home wife and eventually a mom".

Paul had a "strong interest" in Cindy Lake (DeAnna Robbins), a prostitute with whom he fell in love. Before their scheduled marriage, Cindy took a bullet for Paul and died. He later fell for a "mysterious" woman, Cassandra Rawlins (Nina Arvesen), the wife of Paul's client George Rawlins (Jonathan Farwell). George was shot through the heart and killed, and Paul was a suspect in his death; The actor credited the Cassandra-and-George storyline with significantly changing Paul's character, telling the Orlando Sentinel: "It was a tremendous story. Until then I was the younger leading man, and this was really a departure for me." He previously described it as his "first adult storyline", in which Bell transformed Paul "from a juvenile lead into a lead male". The actor told BuddyTV it is his favorite storyline: "I usually claim that the most exciting story for me was Cassandra’s storyline, simply because it was the transition from Paul as a young man to an adult."

For years Paul has been romantically involved with Christine Blair, played by Lauralee Bell (daughter of the show's creator, William J. Bell). In 2013, the couple were married for a second time during the memorial service for their friend Katherine Chancellor (Jeanne Cooper). Davidson felt that the couple never fell out of love, although they were driven apart by characters such as Isabella Braña (Eva Longoria) and Michael Baldwin (Christian LeBlanc). The actor said, "The fact that they have such a strong foundation and relationship beyond husband and wife, is the reason it’s probably going to last forever."

As a teenager Paul dated Nikki Reed (Melody Thomas Scott), and they remained friends for thirty years. In November 2008, Paul and Nikki slept together. Davidson described their reunion as "love in the purest sense": "They've been friends for 30 years and are supporting each other in the most intimate way possible. They do not judge the rightness or wrongness of their actions, nor do they want to tell anyone about it. They know their kids probably won't understand." He also said, "It was the other end of the trail and I don’t think for Paul, at this juncture, was the love of Nikki’s life, nor was Nikki the love of Paul’s." In 2010 the show explored a romance between Paul and Christine's best friend, Nina Webster (Tricia Cast). Cast has praised the couple's storyline for not being "overly dramatic" and more "normal": "Paul and Nina are less exciting—and I like that. There are no shenanigans ...it’s kind of like a real relationship." However, it yielded to Paul and Christine's ongoing affinity.

=== Isabella and Ricky ===
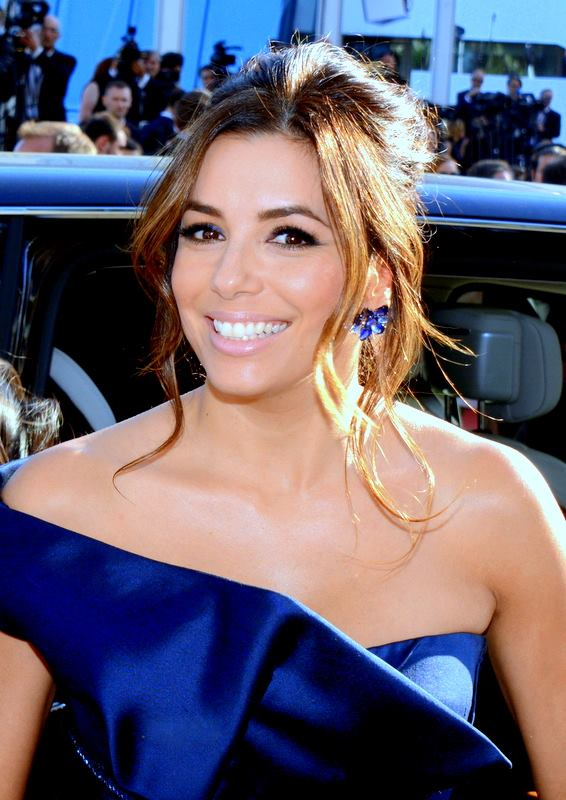
Eva Longoria played Isabella Braña, Paul's mentally unstable lover and (later) wife.

In 2001 Paul cheated on his wife Christine with the mentally unstable Isabella Braña (Eva Longoria), impregnating her. The writers had introduced Isabella as a love interest (and eventual spouse) for him when the pregnant Lauralee Bell was written out of the show. During her two years as a character Isabella developed an obsession with Paul, faked her death (framing Christine) and tried to kill Christine. She was committed to a mental institution, where she remains. Michael Logan of TV Guide called Isabella a "nutjob" who made Christine's life a "living hell", and the National Post called Isabella "evil". Of the show not reintroducing Paul and Isabella's son Ricky, Davidson said at the time: "It’s hard to bring something like that up without delving deeper. I always make the assumption that I am communicating with him offscreen."

In 2011 it was announced that Peter Porte would play Paul and Isabella's rapidly aged adult son, Ricky Williams. Ricky arrived in town as a legal intern working on Sharon Newman's court case. Michael Logan wrote: "But what's he really up to? To get this mystery moving, Y&R needs to remind viewers of the emotional havoc caused by Ricky's mama". Ricky's appearance in Genoa City sparked uncertainty about his motives and personality. Lauralee Bell, who returned for this story arc, said: "That whole Isabella thing was a very scary time for Chris and Paul and now they wonder if there's something off about Ricky. At first, no one knew Isabella was crazy. He could be a whack job like his mother". Bell described Christine's seeing Ricky as a man as "really startling". Davidson said that Paul may have been guilty about Ricky's upbringing, since he was raised by his grandparents.

Viewer suspicions were confirmed when Ricky turned out to be a psychotic like his mother, acting strangely and tormenting Paul. Davidson described the discovery that Paul had a "psycho son" as painful: "You feel it in your heart, and it’s supported by the things you discover with logic. It’s hard to ignore when people are disappearing or dropping dead". One night, Paul arrived at Ricky's place and found his son holding a knife to Eden Baldwin's (Jessica Heap) throat. Paul pulled out a gun, threatened to shoot Ricky and did so, killing his son. Moments before, Ricky had confessed his crimes to Paul (including murdering his former girlfriend). Jillian Bowe of Zap2it asked of the guilt-ridden Paul: "Will this lead him to the brink?" During an interview with On-Air On-Soaps, Davidson said that preparing for the scene where Paul kills his son made him nervous and the storyline was described as one of Paul's toughest yet. About what would happen to Paul after Ricky's death, Davidson felt that it would be "incredibly hard" for the character to come to terms with what happened: "It would be a dark place for the rest of Paul’s life when he thinks of Ricky. It’s like a war veteran. It’s like a part of your life that you have to deal with and go on."

== Reception ==
Davidson's portrayal of Paul has made him one of daytime television's most popular actors in the U.S. He has had a high Q Score, making him a desirable daytime-drama performer. The score is based on "talent, familiarity and likability". Michael Logan of TV Guide has called Davidson "one of daytime's best yet most underrated actors" for his 30-year portrayal of Paul. The Toronto Star has called him "one of soapdom's favorite pin-ups", with Lilana Novakovich calling the actor "one of daytime television's most popular stars". The authors of The Soap Opera Book: Who's Who in Daytime Drama (1992) have called Williams "one of daytime's leading stars". After ten years on the show he was described as a "veteran" by John Goudas of The Gadsden Times, who noted Davidson's "very large fan following". The Washington Times described Paul as a "hero" to the audience. Donna Gable of USA Today called him "daytime's consummate good guy". When Davidson celebrated thirty years on the show, "Melodie" wrote on Zap2it: "Paul's journey from teenage bad boy to resident hero has been an interesting one and I sure hope we see 30 more years from Doug".

Paul's long-term romance with Lauren Fenmore was disliked by fans during the 1980s. John Goudas of the TimesDaily noted that viewers had wanted Paul to dump Lauren for three years, but by the early 1990s fans wanted the couple back together. Discussing a storyline in which a "loyal and protective" Paul dealt with his sister Patty's dementia, Tommy Garrett of Canyon News called Davidson's performance "strong" and "overpowering" yet "understated": "...each week for the past three decades we wonder how he does it so well". In a separate article, Garrett called Davidson "one of the most popular and beloved actors in television history". Michael Fairman of On-Air On-Soaps praised the actor: "Doug is that dependable performer who can make us smile or break us down in tears." TVSource said, "Through the years we've seen Paul at his best and at his worst, but the one constant has always been the raw honesty and conviction in Davidson’s portrayal".

The storyline in which Peter Porte joined the show as Paul's psychotic son Ricky was praised. Adam Hughes of Yahoo! described the possibilities stemming from his return: "Ricky will undoubtedly open up many old wounds and many new story line possibilities. Will he angrily confront Paul? Will Isabella manage to return home, as well, to see her big boy?" After Paul was forced to shoot (and kill) Ricky, Michael Logan of TV Guide wrote that "the actor tackled his toughest story yet when his character unintentionally killed his own son and nearly went to the slammer. Davidson's performance was so beautiful and poignant it made our souls ache". Zap2it placed Davidson on a list of "Top 10 Male Entertainers" by the end of 2012: "For the better part of a decade, daytime's best male crier, Doug Davidson rode the bench on The Young and the Restless. This was strange, since his popular, P.I. character Paul Williams had previously and consistently driven story on the soap throughout the late 70s, 80s, 90s and early 00s". The website was pleased with Paul's new storylines, saying that the "harrowing image" before Paul shot and killed his son "will stay with us for a while". Dave Masko of the website Huliq called "turning the character of Paul from a mainstay on the series for 30 years, into someone who murders his own son" one of the stops pulled out by The Young and the Restless to boost "slipping" ratings.

For his work on The Young and the Restless, Davidson has been awarded three Soap Opera Digest Awards and six nominations. He was nominated for Outstanding Younger Actor in 1986 before his nomination for Outstanding Hero two years later, an award he won in 1990 and 1991. In 1992 and 1997, Davidson won the Soap Opera Digest Award for Outstanding Supporting Actor. The actor was nominated for a Daytime Emmy Award for Outstanding Lead Actor in a Drama Series in 2003, 2010 and 2014 winning the award in 2013. Two years earlier in 2011, he was nominated in the Daytime Emmy Award category for Outstanding Supporting Actor in a Drama Series.

In 2012, Paul was named by writers from Soaps She Knows as the best character of the soap in that year, who wrote that:

He doesn't have the biggest front-burner storylines, yet he always proves to be a character that gets viewers talking. This year was no exception. Whether dealing with Patty, in shock and anguish over shooting his own son, or reuniting with a past love, Paul can be counted on to bring a one-two punch of genuine emotion to each and every scene he is in – it's astounding how Doug Davidson never fails to deliver. Perhaps not the choice one would expect for best use of a character, given that he's not a lead, but he deserves to be recognized.

In 2022, Charlie Mason from the same website placed Paul seventh on his list of the best 25 characters from The Young and the Restless, commenting "There's a good reason that everyone from Eric Braeden (Victor) to, um, the entire audience is always calling for Doug Davidson to get more screentime — and it ain't just nostalgia: We all watched the Emmy winner grow up as Paul, a beach bum — emphasis on the "bum"! — who became the kind of do-right guy that any man would want to be and any woman would want to have."
