= Heather Stevens =

Fictional character from the American CBS soap opera The Young and the Restless

- The Young and the Restless character
- Vail Bloom as Heather Stevens
- Portrayed by: Vail Bloom (2007–2010, 2023–2024); Eden Riegel (2010–2011); Jennifer Landon (2012); (and child actors)
- Duration: 1979–1982; 1993–1994; 2007–2012; 2023–2024
- First appearance: 1979
- Last appearance: October 31, 2024
- Created by: William J. Bell
- Introduced by: William J. Bell and John Conboy (1979); William J. Bell and Edward J. Scott (1993); Lynn Marie Latham and Josh Griffith (2007); Josh Griffith (2023)
- Jennifer Landon as Heather Stevens
In-universe information
- Occupation: District Attorney of Genoa City; Lawyer
- Parents: Paul Williams; April Stevens
- Half-brothers: Ricky Williams; Dylan McAvoy
- Adoptive daughters: Lucy Romalotti
- Grandparents: Carl Williams; Wayne Stevens; Mary Williams; Dorothy Stevens
- Aunts and uncles: Steven Williams; Todd Williams; Patty Williams; Barbara Ann Harding

Heather Stevens is a fictional character The Young and the Restless, an American soap opera on the CBS network. Created by William J. Bell, she was introduced in 1979 as the daughter of Paul Williams (Doug Davidson) and April Stevens (Cindy Eilbacher). She was portrayed by a series of child actors for her first three-year period, followed by Conci Nelson as a teenager. In 2007, the character was reintroduced by then-head writer Lynn Marie Latham as an adult, portrayed by Vail Bloom. At first, she is unaware that she is Paul's daughter, but they develop a father-daughter relationship. She becomes district attorney and later a high-profile lawyer.

Upon her return, she develops a romance with villain Adam Newman (Chris Engen), which received fan support. In 2010, Bloom announced her exit from the soap opera in order to pursue other career opportunities. The role was then recast with Eden Riegel, who remained in the role until her exit in November 2011. Seven months later, Jennifer Landon became the second recast for the role; within five months of joining the cast, she was let go and exited in November 2012. In January 2023, Bloom announced her return to the soap opera in February 2023.

== Casting ==
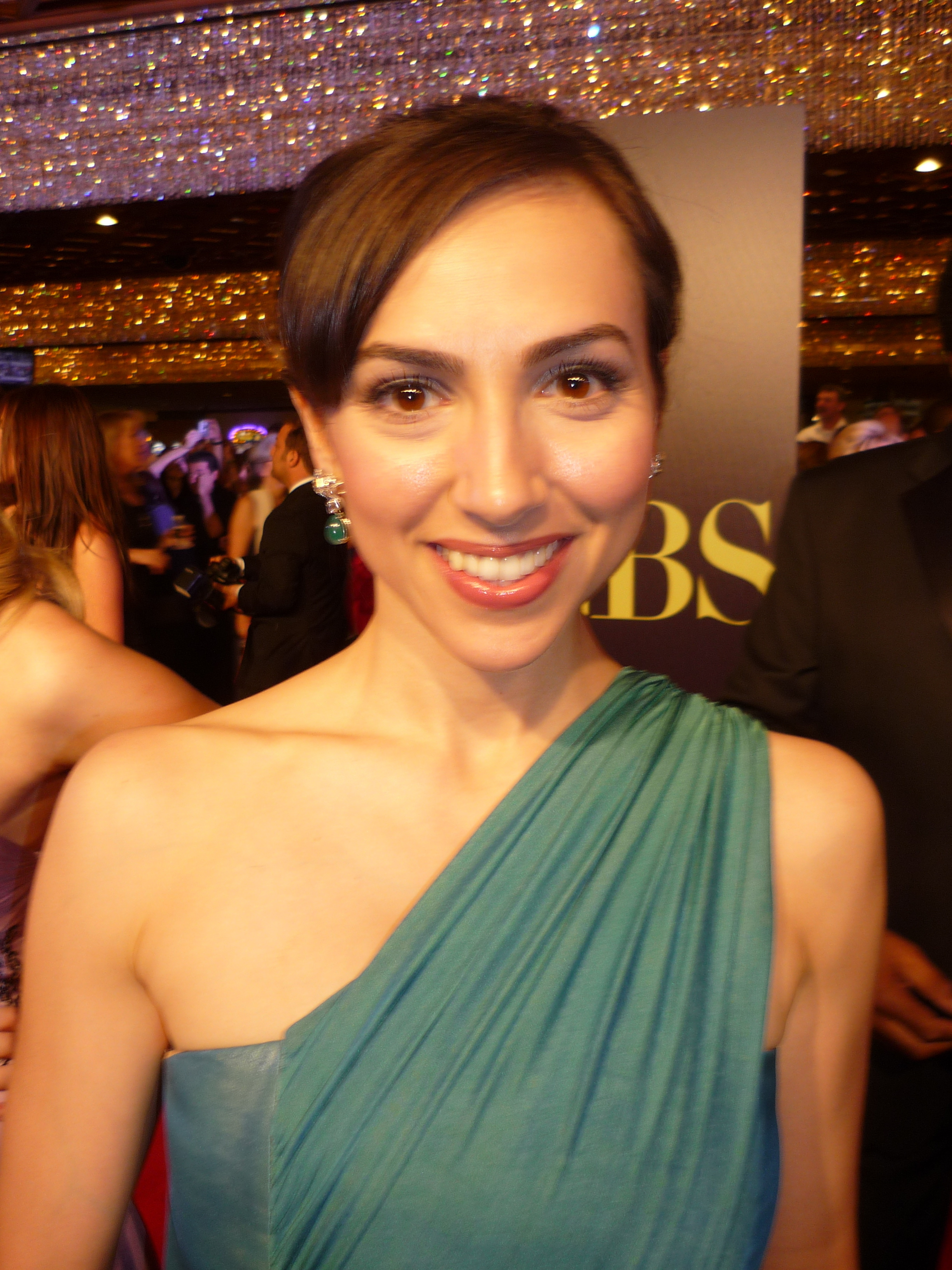
After a ten-year stint as Bianca Montgomery on All My Children, Eden Riegel joined the cast as Heather in 2010, leaving the role a year later in 2011.

The role was first portrayed by twin infants Dana and Lauren Schankman in 1979, followed by Claire and Elizabeth Schoene until 1982. In 1993, the character returned as a teenager portrayed by Conci Nelson, daughter of former head writer Kay Alden. Nelson departed after a year in 1994.

In 2007, it was announced that Bloom, a newcomer to daytime television, would join the cast as an adult version of the character. She made her first appearance on July 13. In 2009, speculation arose that Bloom was preparing to vacate the role, but all rumors were denied. In March 2010, Bloom announced her exit from the soap opera to pursue other career opportunities, as confirmed in a statement from her publicist. Riegel was then announced to be replacing Bloom in the role, after declining to return to her iconic role on All My Children. Bloom made her final appearance on April 6, 2010, with Riegel taking over on April 20.

In September 2011, after returning from a maternity leave, it was announced that Riegel would be leaving the role and exited on November 4. Seven months later, Landon became the second recast for the role and made her debut on June 7, 2012. However, after less than five months with The Young and the Restless, it was announced that Landon was to exit reportedly due to budgetary cuts. Landon departed on November 2, 2012.

In January 2023, it was announced Bloom would return to the role in February of the same year. Bloom made her appearance on February 15, 2023. In July 2023, Bloom made another appearance in a recurring fashion.

== Storylines ==
=== Early years ===
Heather is the daughter of Paul Williams (Doug Davidson) and his first wife, April Stevens (Cindy Eilbacher). As a child, she believes that she is actually the daughter of April's second husband, Robert Lynch. April and Heather re-enter Paul's life at the time when Robert was physically and mentally abusive towards April, and April eventually kills him in self-defense. She is put on trial and convicted of manslaughter, but allowed to fulfill her community service back in New York, so she leaves Genoa City with Heather without letting her know that Paul is her father.

=== 2007–2012 ===
Heather returns to Genoa City in July 2007 to assist district attorney William Bardwell (Ted Shackelford) after he suffers a stroke. However, William dies shortly after and she is assigned all his cases, including the case against Jana Hawkes (Emily O'Brien), Phyllis Newman (Michelle Stafford), and one against opposing counsel Michael Baldwin's (Christian LeBlanc) brother Kevin Fisher (Greg Rikaart) and his friends, Daniel Romalotti (Michael Graziadei) and Amber Moore (Adrienne Frantz). Hoping to establish a connection with his daughter, Paul offers to assist her and decides to tell Heather the truth after much support from Maggie Sullivan, even though April doesn't want him to. Just before Paul tells her the truth, Heather learns of his involvement in the case against Sheila Carter (Kimberlin Brown), but she decides to forgive him and they slowly start to establish a connection as father and daughter. Heather is later surprised to learn that her old college professor, Adrian Korbel (Eyal Podell), is in town. She is then assigned to prosecute tycoon Victor Newman (Eric Braeden) for the murder of Ji Min Kim, who constantly berates her for going up against him, even after the case is dropped and subsequently loses her job by Victor's orders. Heather contemplates leaving town, but is convinced by her father to remain in Genoa City. She gets a job at Jabot Cosmetics and starts a relationship with Victor's son, Adam Newman (Chris Engen).

When Ji Min's murderer is revealed and tied to the case of other murders, Paul lets Heather take full credit for finding the information, resulting in her getting her job back as the assistant district attorney (ADA). After becoming increasingly exhausted from work, Heather learned that she had Epstein-Barr disease. After becoming engaged to Adam, Heather becomes deeply hurt to learn that he had lied to her about forging his father's diary, who was presumed dead. She arrests him and decides to continue trying to find out if Victor actually killed a man named Walter Palin. After helping Adam get released into his father's custody due his becoming blind, Heather admits to Adam that she still loved him even though he asked her to stay away from him, knowing that he could do her harm. With Ashley Abbott's (Eileen Davidson) persuasion, Victor allows Heather free visits to Adam's room at the ranch. After learning Adam's supposed love affair with his lawyer, Rafe Torres (Yani Gellman), Heather ends their relationship. In an attempt to hurt Adam for his betrayal, Heather sleeps with Restless Style editor Billy Abbott (Billy Miller) in attempt to write an exposé on him.

After a bomb is found in her vehicle, Heather is assigned a bodyguard, who turns out to be Chance Chancellor (John Driscoll). Chance's fiancée, Chloe Mitchell (Elizabeth Hendrickson), becomes increasingly concerned with Heather's intentions concerning him, and during a night of heated passions, Heather and Chance give into temptations and sleep together. After Chance is presumed dead and shot by his half-brother Ronan Malloy (Jeff Branson), Heather begins a relationship with him, causing another rift between her and Chloe, who also had relationships with Malloy. Heather is soon granted the position as the temporary district attorney of Genoa City. As she campaigns to hold the position, she receives an offer from Victor to reopen the case against Adam in exchange for campaign funding. Suspicious, Billy publishes an article in Restless Style exposing Heather's false honesty, which in turn makes her drop her campaign for district attorney. She later becomes the general prosecutor in the case against Sharon Newman (Sharon Case) for murder. After reconnecting with her half-brother, Ricky Williams (Peter Porte), and believing she could trust him, he takes pictures of her kissing Adam, who was a key suspect in the case against Sharon. He publishes them in Restless Style and ruins her reputation, causing her to leave Genoa City and return to New York City.

Seven months later in June 2012, Heather returns to town at the request of Michael, who offers her the position as assistant district attorney. Originally skeptical about the job, she later accepts it and moves back to Genoa City. In her new position, Heather takes on the case of the disappearance of Daisy Carter (Yvonne Zima) and suspects her husband, Daniel Romalotti, as the culprit, but later exonerates him. She still holds a grudge against Ricky, though when her father Paul becomes increasingly concerned that Ricky is dangerous, she thinks nothing of it. Heather becomes frustrated with her father when he shoots and subsequently kills Ricky, who was threatening to hurt Eden Baldwin (Jessica Heap). After an ongoing flirtation with Daniel, the pair begin an affair, despite his marriage to the missing Daisy. Heather later becomes frustrated when Ronan takes the lead in the case against her father. She spends the majority of her time looking for a way to exonerate Paul, while still maintaining her relationship with Daniel. When Daisy is found at a psychiatric hospital, Heather bows out of any romance with Daniel, but when Daisy disappears yet again, they reunite. In November 2012, Heather and Paul's ex-wife, Christine Blair (Lauralee Bell), travel to Los Angeles to find evidence to prove Paul's innocence. Heather is later have said to met up with Daniel in Chicago, and when he briefly returns, he announces that he is moving to Savannah, Georgia and Heather is moving with him. Both Heather and Daniel also lived in Europe, before returning to Savannah. After their return to Savannah in 2018, Heather and Daniel continued to face numerous challenges, which strengthened their bond. Their journey was marked by personal growth and resilience.

=== 2023–2024 ===
In early 2023, Heather and Lucy return to Genoa City to visit Daniel. Heather ultimately decides to stay in Genoa City long-term with Lucy and reunites with Daniel as they move in together. Heather also represents Phyllis as her attorney during her legal troubles involved with the faking of her death earlier in the year. Heather, Lucy, and Daniel maintain a period of relative bliss while their family has been reunited.

In July 2024, the couple decided to leave Genoa City for a new beginning in Portugal, seeking a fresh start and new opportunities, symbolizing their commitment to each other and hope for a peaceful future.

After weeks of harassment by Sharon Newman against their family, Heather was murdered in late September 2024. The murder, which was revealed in the form of a flashback dream by Sharon, occurred in Heather and Daniel's apartment. Heather and Sharon engaged in a fight as Heather discovered Sharon breaking into her home. A brief struggle ensues and Sharon falls unconscious onto the couch. Once Sharon awakens, she discovers Heather dead on the floor. Distraught and panicked, Sharon decides to take Heather's body and wraps it into a rug. Sharon takes the body into her vehicle and dumps it into a nearby river. Daniel, who begins to worry as Heather has gone missing, soon learns that Heather has been killed and her body was recovered from the river. Sharon believes she has murdered Heather, as revenge on Daniel for his role in the death of her daughter Cassie. Sharon, believing she was the one who killed Heather, then attempted to frame Daniel for the murder, as further revenge. However, in November 2024 it is revealed that Sharon did not kill Heather. Heather was killed by Cole Howard's aunt Jordan Howard, on behalf of Ian Ward.

== Reception ==
In 2021, Richard Simms from Soaps She Knows put Heather on his list of the most hated soap opera characters, commenting that "It didn’t much matter who played the part of Paul’s daughter on The Young and the Restless, the audience never took to the character (or her romance with Adam Newman). When even the actress who was beloved as All My Children's Bianca can’t give viewers a heroine addiction, you know something’s not working". In 2023, Simms and Charlie Mason questioned Heather's choice to represent Phyllis Summers (Michelle Stafford) in court, calling it the "Strangest Choice" of American Soap Operas of that year and "bewildering" that Heather would represent "the woman who once upon a time ran down dad Paul with her car".
