= Ricky Williams (The Young and the Restless) =

- The Young and the Restless character
- Peter Porte as Ricky Williams
- Portrayed by: Peter Porte (2011–12) (and child actors)
- Duration: 2002–2003, 2011–2012
- First appearance: May 10, 2002
- Last appearance: July 2, 2012
- Created by: Kay Alden; Trent Jones
- Introduced by: David Shaughnessy (2002); Maria Arena Bell (2011)
In-universe information
- Other names: Ricardo Carl Williams
- Occupation: Former Reporter for Restless Style magazine/webzine Former Intern for attorney Avery Clark; Former Graduate student in journalism at Northwestern University; Former Undergraduate student at University of California at Berkeley
- Father: Paul Williams
- Mother: Isabella Braña
- Half-brothers: Dylan McAvoy
- Half-sisters: Heather Stevens
- Grandfathers: Ricardo Braña; Carl Williams
- Grandmothers: Trinidad Braña; Mary Williams
- Uncles: Todd Williams; Steve Williams
- Aunts: Patty Williams

Ricky Williams is a fictional character from the CBS Daytime soap opera The Young and the Restless. The character was created as the son of Paul Williams (Doug Davidson) and Isabella Braña (Eva Longoria), born onscreen on May 10, 2002. After being portrayed by a series of unidentified infant child actors, the character was raised by Isabella's parents in Los Angeles, California. In 2011, Ricky was rapidly aged to an adult, with Peter Porte being cast to play the character. Zap2it described Ricky as "a one-dimensional villain with daddy and mommy issues".

Upon his return as an adult, Ricky was resentful of his father Paul for his lack of involvement in his life in his early years. In June 2012, Porte was let go from the soap opera and his departure was slated to be a dramatic exit. Within the storyline, Paul found Ricky about to kill Eden Baldwin (Jessica Heap) and shot him to save her, killing him.

== Casting and development ==
"Regardless of his initial motivation for heading back to Wisconsin, Ricky will undoubtedly open up many old wounds and many new story line possibilities. Will he angrily confront Paul? Will Isabella manage to return home, as well, to see her big boy? Will Ricky shake up the local singles scene?"

— Adam Hughes of Yahoo! TV on Ricky's return

For the character's first year, he was portrayed by a series of unidentified infant actors. In August 2011, reports announced that Peter Porte would be joining the cast as an adult Ricky. Porte debuted on September 13, 2011. After less than a year in the role, it was announced in June 2012 that Porte had been let go, and his "dramatic exit" aired on July 2. Of Porte's exit, Nelson Branco of Soap Opera Unsensored stated, "Too bad, since the improved actor has finally been winning over fans and critics with his surprisingly intense and compelling performance of a man unhinged. Expect a sensational climax and conclusion in Ricky’s storyline that involves Daisy and Phyllis." Porte said he was disappointed to be leaving the role.

Porte compared Ricky to his mother Isabella, saying, "I was there just under a year, but when you start stealing babies, threatening lead characters and murdering people, you know your time is going to be limited. He certainly was his mother's son!" Zap2it described Ricky as "a one-dimensional villain with daddy and mommy issues".

== Storylines ==
After being sent to live with Isabella's parents who raised him, Ricky returned to Genoa City working for Avery Bailey Clark (Jessica Collins) during the Sharon Newman murder case. He meets his half-sister, Heather Stevens (then Eden Riegel), for the first time. Heather was the general prosecutor in the murder case, causing them to be on opposing sides of the case. Ricky took pictures of Heather kissing Adam Newman (Michael Muhney), a key suspect in Sharon's case. He originally intended to give the pictures to Phyllis Newman to publish in Restless Style magazine, however, he gave them to Avery for safe keeping instead. When Sharon was finally set free thanks to Phyllis and Ronan Malloy, Avery brought the pictures to the courthouse, and she left them on the desk. When Avery wasn't looking, Phyllis took the pictures and published them on the internet. She ruined Heather's reputation, and this meltdown caused Heather to leave Genoa City permanently. Paul was furious that Ricky was responsible for Heather's departure, but he looked past his son's mistake in order to reconnect with him again. Ricky then sought to bring Phyllis down for stealing his pictures, enlisting in Avery's help to sue her.

While battling Phyllis, Ricky decided to apply for Editor-in-Chief of Restless Style, being that it was under new management. Before his interview, Ricky snuck into the police station and took pictures of a file involved in the Diane Jenkins murder investigation. Billy Abbott (Billy Miller) denied Ricky's application, and he decided to go to Phyllis with his incriminating pictures. Ricky made a deal with Phyllis which allowed him access to Restless Style's website, and he published an article about Nikki Newman's (Melody Thomas Scott) involvement in the murder investigation. Later on, he meets his uncle Todd Williams and he meets and offers to help his aunt Patty Williams (Stacy Haiduk) who is hiding from police, however that was all a scam in order to write an article about Patty and Jack Abbott (Peter Bergman). Ricky then wanted to write that article with Phyllis, though she turned him down as she promised her ex-husband Nick that she wouldn't write an article on the subject. However, Ricky took matters into his own hands and wrote the article anyway then published it online, aggravating various other people, including Paul, who confronted Ricky. The only excuse he gave was that Paul never looked out for his psychotic mother Isabella. Paul claims that he hasn't gone through what Patty has, but Paul never did realize that he did grow up watching his insane mother. Ricky then gets recruited by Phyllis to get close to Daisy Carter so that she can use whatever information he can get against her so that Daniel can get full custody of Lucy. Ricky does just that and more, even going so far as to have sex with Daisy on March 29, 2012. However, he's unaware that Eden Baldwin, who Ricky had recently started dating, has caught them in the act. The tables turn for Phyllis when Ricky decides to become Daisy's ally, whether she wants it or not at times. He willingly helped kidnap Lucy for Daniel to lose custody. He may have grown an obsession with her as he became very angry when she announced she's still trying to win Daniel. But he blackmails her into giving him her old apartment. Despite the uneasiness, Daisy's still fully supportive of helping him bring down Phyllis and tormenting her. Paul is also beginning to doubt how innocent his son really is. Daisy discovered Ricky was a murderer.

In June 2012, Eden goes to see Ricky offering to have a drink with him. They go to the bar and she claims to have to go to the bathroom, leaving Ricky waiting. In truth Eden had been suspicious of Ricky for some time, and convinces a maid to unlock his door and let her in. She discovers Daisy's purse and finds her ID inside, and is about to call Kevin when Ricky catches her. She tries to run, but ends up having a struggle with Ricky, and ends up knocking herself unconscious after hitting her head on the side of the bathtub. Ricky is discovered in the nick of time by Paul, who, just moments earlier, attempted to have a purported heart-to-heart conversation with his son. He catches Ricky holding an unconscious Eden with a large knife in his hand. Paul pulls out a gun and pleads with Ricky to drop the knife, but is met with malicious words from Ricky, saying that it was Paul's fault for the way he turned out. Ricky confesses to killing his ex-girlfriend Rachel. He clearly implies that he also killed Daisy Carter, who he says he "got rid of", and his college friend Craig Hunt. Ricky refuses to drop the knife and, in a rage, dares Paul to shoot him. After more shouting from Ricky and repeated attempts by Paul to get Ricky to drop the knife, Ricky stands up and violently taunts Paul to shoot him. When it appears that Ricky is about to stab Eden, Paul shoots him in the right arm, causing him to fall backwards through the upper-floor bathroom window to his death.

== Reception ==
Jamey Giddens of Zap2it said it was "too bad" Porte never received "any material worth his talent during his stint", also saying, "Dude isn't a bad actor!" On-Air On-Soaps said Porte's dismissal came "just as fans were starting to dig evil Ricky Williams". Giddens predicted Porte's exit within the storyline would give Paul's tear ducts "a workout".
