= Abby Newman =

- The Young and the Restless character
- Melissa Ordway as Abby Newman
- Portrayed by: Madison and Morgan Reinherz (2000–2003); Rachel and Amanda Pace (2003); Darcy Rose Byrnes (2003–2008); Hayley Erin (2008–2010); Emme Rylan (2010–2013); Melissa Ordway (2013–present)
- Duration: 2000–present
- First appearance: November 13, 2000
- Created by: Kay Alden
- Introduced by: William J. Bell and Edward J. Scott (2000); Bradley Bell (2007); Maria Arena Bell and Paul Rauch (2008); Jill Farren Phelps (2013); Michele Val Jean and Tracey Thomson (2026) (Note: In addition to Michele Val Jean and Tracey Thomson, other executive producers for Beyond the Gates include Sheila Ducksworth, Lela Coffey, Anna Saalfeld, Julie Hanan Carruthers, Leon W. Russell, and Derrick Johnson.)
- Crossover appearances: Beyond the Gates; The Bold and the Beautiful
In-universe information
- Other names: Abby Rachel Carlton Newman; Abby Rayburn; Abby Chancellor; Abby Winters
- Occupation: Hotelier; Businesswoman; Business investor; Marketing executive; Reality television star; Sales promoter; Socialite
- Family: Newman
- Father: Victor Newman
- Mother: Ashley Abbott
- Adoptive father: Brad Carlton
- Stepfather: Tucker McCall (2011–2012, 2023–2024)
- Stepmother: Nikki Newman
- Half-brothers: Nicholas Newman; Adam Newman; Robert Carlton
- Half-sisters: Victoria Newman; Colleen Carlton (adoptive)
- Spouse: Stitch Rayburn (2015–2016); Chance Chancellor (2020–2023); Devon Hamilton (2024–present)
- Sons: Dominic Abbott Newman Winters Chancellor
- Grandfathers: Albert Miller; Brent Davis; Arthur Kaplan (adoptive); John Abbott (legal)
- Grandmothers: Cora Miller; Dina Mergeron; Rebecca Kaplan (adoptive)
- Uncles: Matt Miller; Jack Abbott; Billy Abbott (legal); Eric Vanderway
- Aunts: Traci Abbott; Stephanie Kaplan (adoptive)
- Nephews: Noah Newman; Reed Hellstrom; Johnny Abbott (adoptive); Connor Newman; Christian Newman
- Nieces: Claire Newman; Cassie Newman (adoptive); Summer Newman; Faith Newman; Katie Abbott
- First cousins: Keemo Volien Abbott; Kyle Abbott; John Abbott III; Colleen Carlton; Delia Abbott (legal); Johnny Abbott (legal); Katie Abbott (legal); Theo Vanderway

Abby Newman is a fictional character from the American CBS soap opera The Young and the Restless. The character was introduced on November 13, 2000, as the daughter of Ashley Abbott (Eileen Davidson) and Victor Newman (Eric Braeden). The role was portrayed by Darcy Rose Byrnes as a child until 2008, when the character was rapidly aged to a teenager, with Hayley Erin assuming the role the following year. In 2010, the character rapidly aged to adulthood, with Emme Rylan cast as Erin's replacement. Rylan was let go in 2012 due to budgetary cuts but returned months later in February 2013 on a recurring status following viewer complaints. However, her return was cut short once Rylan vacated the role to join General Hospital as Lulu Spencer. Melissa Ordway was then hired as her recast, who made her debut on April 16, 2013. Rylan compared Abby to her previous role, Lizzie Spaulding on Guiding Light, saying they were both wealthy heiresses who cause trouble. Upon Abby's return in 2013, Rylan felt that she had become "more mature".

== Casting ==
In 2003, Darcy Rose Byrnes began portraying the character on The Young and the Restless and The Bold and the Beautiful. Byrnes' run came to an end in June 2008 when Noah Newman was aged to a teenager, and Abby's character was soon to follow. In December 2008, it was announced that Hayley Erin had been cast to portray a teenaged version of the character. In March 2010, it was announced that the character had rapidly aged again to an adult, with Marcy Rylan scheduled to join the cast. Erin made her final appearance on April 14, with Rylan's debut on May 18, 2010. Previously, Rylan was known for her three-year portrayal of Lizzie Spaulding on Guiding Light.

In December 2011, Rylan took a maternity leave and was absent from the soap opera for several weeks. In September 2012, it was announced that Rylan had been let go from The Young and the Restless reportedly due to budgetary cuts, with her last airdate on October 23, 2012. Within two months of her departure, it was announced that Rylan would be returning due to viewer complaints; her recurring return began on February 11, 2013. However, Rylan was announced to exit again soon after when news broke of her casting in the contract role of Lulu Spencer on ABC's General Hospital, Rylan vacated the role on April 10, 2013. Melissa Ordway was then announced to take over the role, with her debut on April 16, 2013. From late 2017 to February 2018, Ordway took maternity leave, with Abby returning during the episode that originally aired on March 8, 2018. In November 2024, Ordway announced she had been demoted to recurring status.

On January 27, 2026, it was announced Ordway would crossover to Beyond the Gates as Abby. This event is scheduled to air from June 9 to June 12 of the same year.

== Development ==
=== Characterization ===
"Now that I’m in the trenches, I don’t feel that way... After hitting the stage, I realized immediately that Abby and Lizzie are very different, especially when it comes to the relationships they share with their family."

— Rylan, TV Guide

Abby was conceived when Ashley Abbott, desperate to have Victor Newman's child to replace the one whom she aborted years prior, stole his sperm from Diane Jenkins, who had obtained the sample illegally from a fertility lab. Ashley then secretly inseminated herself, and Abigail, "Abby" for short, was born on November 13, 2000. Abby believed her father was Brad Carlton and was consequently given his last name. When Ashley had cancer, she recorded a video message for Abby to see when she was older and revealed Victor was her biological father. Ashley survived her cancer, but Abby saw the video without her mother's knowledge and ran to Victor. After the truth came out, she changed her name to Abigail Carlton Newman. In 2008, Abby's birth year was revised to 1994 when she was said to be 14 years old in December 2008. With the role being recast in 2010, Abby's birth year is revised to 1988 when she is aged to 21.

Rylan was initially afraid that Abby was very similar to Lizzie Spaulding as they were both wealthy rich heiresses who caused trouble. Rylan embraces typecast and stated that as an actor, it is good to be seen as someone who can play "good, bad, and the in-between". Rylan's Abby first appears in May 2010, promoting herself as an animal rights activist. She garners the nickname 'The Naked Heiress' when she flashes photographers in the lobby of Jabot Cosmetics.

Rylan states that Abby is a member of the Newmans and the Abbotts and "Abby is a little more half-and-half." Emme Rylan believes that Abby is such a rebel because she needs attention to feel like she matters to those around her. Abby's reality-TV star personality leads many to believe that Abby is the next Paris Hilton.

After a short departure, Abby returns to Genoa City in 2013. Rylan felt that she was "more mature" and said, "For the first time, Abby is feeling a little embarrassed about her previous choices [...] She's trying really hard to be a better person...and figure out where she fits if she's not running around naked."

=== Romance ===
In 2010, Abby was romantically linked with Daniel Romalotti. Soon after, she began flirting with Daniel Romalotti when the two begin sharing romantic interactions. Abby had sex with Daniel in the Newman pool house, and she recorded it for her reality show. Abby and Daniel's relationship was outed when Nikki Newman and Daniel's mother, Phyllis Summers, saw Abby and Daniel making out in public. Their relationship continued for a while, but when Abby found out that Daniel fathered a child with Daisy Carter, she broke up with him.

Upon Abby's return, Abby is romantically linked to Marco Dapper's Carmine Basco, when the two begin dating, much to him being shunned by the town, but Abby is able to convince some of them that Carmine is a good soul. However the relationship wasn't given closure upon Rylan's exit from the soap opera. Dapper admitted in an interview that the writers "didn't really know what to do with him after Abby left the first time". He also stated that he hoped Carmine would have more of a "darker turn", and that he still believes there is a "left over spark" with Abby as their storyline "was never finished" and "nothing was wrapped up properly".

Shortly after her failed relationship with Carmine, Abby took romantic interest in Detective Ignacio Serricchio's Alex Chavez, and they began dating. However, the relationship was short-lived when the writers soon began developing Abby's relationship with Redaric Williams's Tyler Michaelson. According to Williams, Tyler is "intrigued" by Abby's unpredictable nature and said that their natural attraction could lead to romance. However, Williams hinted that Tyler's interest in Abby could be his attempt to "suppress his feelings" for Lily. Abby and Tyler's relationship faced some interference from Tyler's ex-fiancée, Mariah Copeland, but she seemed to back off leading to Tyler proposing to Abby and they became engaged. However, Abby breaks off the engagement when Mariah's interferences causes Abby to believe Tyler is still in love with Mariah.

== Storylines ==
Abby Newman - the goddess herself. She practically invented viral videos.

— Nazanin to Abby, The Young and the Restless

Abby went with Ashley when she left Genoa City to work for Jabot International in Hong Kong. Ashley later moved to Los Angeles with Abby, and later London, England for Ashley's work with Forrester Creations. Ashley traveled to Paris, France in search of Abby's father, Victor. Abby's parents eventually reunited and Brad became jealous when Abby bonded more with her real father Victor. However, Brad drowned in 2009, and his daughter, Colleen Carlton, died by a similar fate several months later in 2009, leaving Abby as the sole beneficiary to the Carlton estate. After the deaths of the Carltons, Abby began to rebel against her parents. She pursued the much older Ryder Callahan, and she unknowingly assisted with one of his schemes with his sister, Daisy Carter. Eventually, they were caught, and Abby decided to avoid the siblings.

Abby protested in front the lobby of Jabot Cosmetics after Tucker McCall became the company owner. Abby did not know that her mother returned to become CEO. Then, Abby planned to start her own reality television show, entitled "The Naked Heiress", but she didn't have the money to fund her dream. After her parents refused to help her, Abby hired Rafe Torres as her lawyer to sue her parents for her inheritance. Soon after, she began flirting with Daniel Romalotti. When Billy and Victoria Newman Abbott refused to help Abby with her reality television dream, she blackmailed Billy to be featured in his magazine, Restless Style. She eventually revealed Billy and Victoria's secret Jamaican marriage to their family and friends. Seemingly unstoppable, the judge then denied Abby's plea for her inheritance. Meanwhile, Abby had sex with Daniel in the Newman pool house, and she recorded it for her reality show. Abby and Daniel's relationship was outed when Nikki Newman and Daniel's mother, Phyllis Summers, saw Abby and Daniel making out in public. Their relationship continued for a while, but when Abby found out that Daniel fathered a child with Daisy Carter, she broke up with him. After she witnessed her mother kissing Tucker McCall, she asked him to go into business with her. When Tucker turned her down, Abby decided to take a bubble bath in Katherine Chancellor's pool at the annual Chancellor Fourth of July party. Abby's inheritance was then withheld indefinitely. To spite her parents, Abby rode a horse, while naked, inside the Genoa City Athletic Club while Victor and Nikki were celebrating their engagement. She was arrested and thrown in jail. Upon her release, Abby decided to reopen her lawsuit against Victor, with the help of her uncle Jack Abbott. Later, Abby's half-siblings Victoria and Nicholas Newman joined her in her lawsuit. Victor tried to bargain with his children, but they wanted his cosmetics line, Beauty of Nature. He refused their offer, and with the help of testimonies from their estranged half-brother Adam Newman and Neil Winters, they each received $500 million in the settlement.

When a powerful storm hit Genoa City, Abby searched for her mother, and she found Tucker with Diane Jenkins. When Tucker proposed to Ashley in 2010, Abby was disgusted with her stepfather-to-be. Meanwhile, Abby now had the funds to produce The Naked Heiress, and she made her debut by stripping at Gloworm. She was then arrested and thrown in jail for indecent exposure. Abby invited her mother on a girls' night out in an attempt to repair their relationship. In reality, she lured her mother to a cabin where she had manipulated Tucker into meeting Diane. On the way, Abby accidentally crashed into Tucker, leaving him severely injured. Ashley switched places with Abby, and she was jailed for her "reckless driving". Abby soon remembered that she was the driver, but her parents sent her to rehab to prevent her from confessing the truth. Before she left, she made a confessional tape with the truth about the accident, and the tape fell into the hands of Diane Jenkins and Deacon Sharpe. Abby returned from rehab after only a few days, and Tucker woke up from his coma soon after. He married Ashley from his hospital bed the next day. He, too, remembered that Abby hit him, not Ashley. Abby decided to come clean to Tucker, and he forgave her. They decided to keep the truth between the two of them. With Diane threatening to reveal her confession tape to the public, she met her in the town park. The next day, Abby woke up with dirt on her clothes to hear the news that Diane's body was found in the park. Abby remembered wrestling with Diane for a key to a safe where her confession tape was located. Detective Ronan Malloy revealed that a key was found in Diane's throat. Ashley also met with Diane on the night of the murder, and she learned that Tucker did actually have an affair with Diane. Ashley apologized to Abby for not believing her. Detective Malloy eventually found a flash drive with Abby's confession hidden in a piece of evidence. The police arrested Abby for hitting Tucker with her car, but Tucker saved her when he told the police that Abby was not the driver. After Ashley and Tucker's official wedding ceremony in 2011, Abby went on vacation to Los Angeles, California for the holidays.

She is now working at Newman alongside her sister Victoria and father Victor and just married Ben Rayburn on December 31, 2015, but is having doubts.

Married life seemed to be agreeing with Abby. It looked as if Ben and Abby had the perfect life laid out for them. That is until Stitch's (Ben Rayburn's) son Max was orphaned after his mom (Ben's ex) was killed in a car accident the day of his and Abby's wedding. Stitch's son and mother were en route to the wedding so Max could be a part of his father's wedding. But misfortune took and Ben's son ended up at the Genoa City Police Department with the department's police chief and lead detective, Paul Williams. Following the wedding, Ben is phoned by Paul from the station of an emergency and he and Abby rush to join Max and Paul there.

== Reception ==
Tommy Garrett of the website Highlight Hollywood slammed executive producer Jill Farren Phelps for her initial firing of Rylan, who he described as "the best thing on Y&R in decades". Garrett was unfavorable of Ordway's performance, calling her "Melissa Ordinary" and stating that she is "as exciting to watch, as being stuck in traffic on the L.A. Freeway". Soap Opera Digest wrote that letting Rylan "slip away" to join General Hospital was "puzzling". Soaps in Depth was also critical of the soap opera's decision to let Rylan leave for General Hospital, writing: "Turns out if you snooze, you really do lose. Anyone requiring proof that The Young and the Restless corrected a recent blunder by bringing Emme Rylan back as Abby... and then allowed her to be stolen away by General Hospital, where she'll take over the role of Lulu. Adding insult to injury? Just how much Rylan's return reminded us of how much we loved her as Abby!" They also wrote that they would "never understand how Y&R was foolish enough to let Rylan slip through their fingers not once but twice". The magazine praised the character's change in maturity, describing her as the "new, improved Abby". They wrote:

Almost immediately, it became clear that this was a different Abby than the one who'd left Genoa City a few months earlier. While she still had a way with a quip, her remarks were less pointed and more loving. Gone were the antics of the Naked Heiress and in their place was a young woman determined to take full advantage of her position as the rare Newman/Abbott hybrid. Despite Abby's newfound maturity, Rylan had plenty of opportunity to let her alter ego's mischievous side to play... especially where her former beau Carmine was concerned.

In 2022, Melissa received her first Daytime Emmy nomination for Outstanding Supporting Actress in a Drama Series.

Charlie Mason and Richard Simms from Soaps She Knows named Abby's affair with Devon Hamilton (Bryton James) as the "Most Shocking Hookup" of soap operas of 2022, commenting that their "jaws definitely dropped when Young & Restless' Devon and Abby suddenly started going at it on the couch... and the stairs... and against the wall...".
