= Daniel Romalotti =

Fictional character from the American CBS soap opera The Young and the Restless

- The Young and the Restless character
- Michael Graziadei as Daniel Romalotti
- Portrayed by: Cam Gigandet (2004); Michael Graziadei (2004–present); (and others)
- Duration: 1994–1998; 2004–2013; 2016; 2022–present
- First appearance: May 19, 1994
- Created by: William J. Bell
- Introduced by: Edward J. Scott (1994); David Shaughnessy and John F. Smith (2004); Charles Pratt Jr. and Mal Young (2016); Anthony Morina and Josh Griffith (2022)
In-universe information
- Occupation: Artist; Photographer's assistant
- Father: Brian Hamilton; Danny Romalotti (legal)
- Mother: Phyllis Summers
- Half-sisters: Summer Newman
- Wife: Lily Winters (2006–2007); Amber Moore (2009–2010); Daisy Carter (2012)
- Daughters: Lucy Romalotti
- Grandfathers: George Summers; Rex Sterling (legal)
- Grandmothers: Lydia Callahan
- Aunts: Avery Bailey Clark; Gina Roma (legal)
- Nephews: Harrison Abbott (adoptive)

Daniel Romalotti is a fictional character on the CBS soap opera The Young and the Restless. The role has most notably been portrayed by Michael Graziadei since 2004.

Daniel is the son of Phyllis Summers (Michelle Stafford/Sandra Nelson/Gina Tognoni) and Danny Romalotti (Michael Damian), however a later storyline revealed that Daniel's biological father is a man named Brian Hamilton. Daniel's major storylines have included a love story and marriage with Lily Winters (Christel Khalil/Davetta Sherwood), of which their parents disapproved, as well as being married to Amber Moore (Adrienne Frantz). Daniel fathered a child named Lucy after the mother, Daisy Carter (Yvonne Zima), raped Daniel. Other storylines include his strong friendship with Kevin Fisher (Greg Rikaart), the death of Cassie Newman (Camryn Grimes), and short-lived romances with Abby Newman (Marcy Rylan/Melissa Ordway) and Eden Baldwin (Jessica Heap).

Graziadei's performance in the role received positive reviews from audiences and critics. He was nominated for the Daytime Emmy Award for Outstanding Younger Actor in a Drama Series in 2005 and 2006, and for Outstanding Supporting Actor in a Drama Series in 2025 and 2026.

== Casting ==
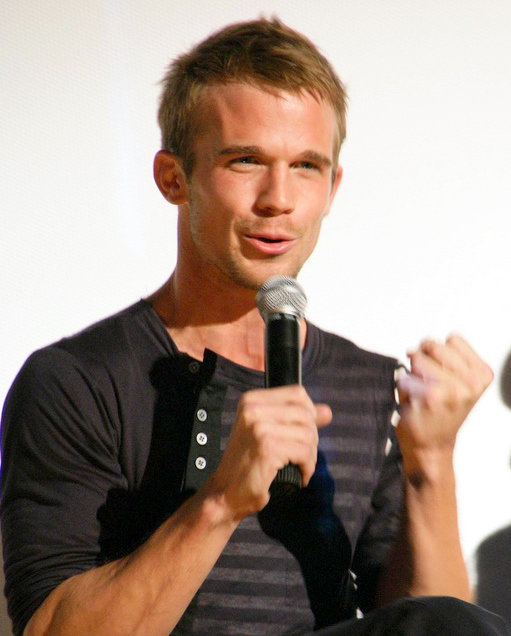
Cam Gigandet's portrayal of Daniel was short-lived as he was let go shortly after his arrival.

The character was first portrayed by twins Desiree and Hannah Wheel from 1994 to 1996, after which Michael McElroy took over the recurring role from 1996 to 1997. Chase MacKenzie Bebak portrayed Daniel from 1997 to 1998, followed by Roland Gibbons, who had a brief stint until the character was written out.

Subsequently, the character was rapidly aged, with Cam Gigandet assuming the role on March 10, 2004. The actor was fired after only a few days, and he last aired as Daniel on May 6, 2004. The role was recast with Owen Beckman, but the actor was also fired soon after landing the role; as opposed to Gigandet, Beckman's scenes were deleted when Michael Graziadei was cast in the role, who debuted on May 10, 2004. In May 2009, Graziadei signed a new contract with the soap, but in 2012, he chose not to renew his contract. He made his last appearance on January 3, 2013. However, Graziadei later reprised the role for four episodes from July 30 to August 2, 2013, to help usher his onscreen mother, Michelle Stafford, out of the series.

In July 2016, Entertainment Weekly reported that Graziadei would briefly return on August 25, 2016, coinciding with The Young and the Restless's 11,000th episode.

In September 2022, it was announced Graziadei would return; he returned on November 21 of the same year.

== Storylines ==
Daniel was born off-screen on August 17, 1993; his birth year has since been revised to 1987. Daniel first arrived in Genoa City in 2004 after returning from boarding school to live with his mother, Phyllis Summers. Because she did not raise him as a child, Daniel resented Phyllis as well as her boyfriend, chemist Damon Porter. Daniel then befriended Kevin Fisher, who was desperate to regain some respect after performing some not so nice deeds. Daniel agreed to help him out in exchange for hooking him up with Mackenzie Browning. The two had a lowlife named Alex come on to Lily Winters too strong, so that Kevin could rescue her and that she would like him. Alex went too far and slipped her a date rape drug and attempted to rape her. However, Kevin did arrive in time to "save" her. When Alex kept threatening Daniel and Kevin, Phyllis found out, and she and Damon scared Alex enough to get him out of town. Daniel then decided to give Phyllis a chance.

Michael Graziadei and Christel Khalil as Daniel Romalotti and Lily Winters

Daniel had a romance with Lily Winters in 2005, after he was involved in an accident with Cassie Newman, resulting in her death. Suffering memory loss from the accident, Daniel could not remember that fourteen-year-old Cassie was driving in an ill-fated attempt to drive a drunken Daniel home herself. Daniel and Lily then ran away to Los Angeles to escape vehicular homicide charges, and a Romeo and Juliet-style romance unfolded. The fugitives were caught, and Daniel was soon exonerated. Lily's furious parents, Neil and Dru Winters, soon sent her away to boarding school, leaving Daniel devastated. Lily returned in February 2006, and they reunited and eloped in Las Vegas. Later on, Alex returned to blackmail Daniel and Kevin. Daniel then decided to come clean to Lily, who then told her parents. However, she decided to forgive him as did her parents.

In early 2007, Daniel began a flirtation with the conniving Amber Forrester, of which Lily was unaware. He then began helping her in her mission to keep her new husband, Cane Ashby, so that she could get her hands on his newfound family's money. To say thank you, Amber gave Daniel a pass to watch a video of her on an adult website, which eventually led to Daniel becoming addicted to pornography. After Lily figured out that Amber was the person that had a picture of her naked breasts on Daniel's cellphone, she realized that she couldn't trust her husband any longer and subsequently kicked him out. When Neil found out about Daniel's recent behavior, he fired him from his job at Newman Enterprises. Daniel then moved in with Kevin and Amber.

Daniel, Amber, and Kevin found a princely sum of money ($700,000 to be precise) belonging to Plum, one of Amber's beaus from her Strangers By Night days. They found the money next to Plum's dead body and decided to keep it all a secret. They then received a visit from John Bonacheck who claimed to be looking for Plum and his money because Plum had stolen it from his war buddy, Carson McDonald. It turned out Bonacheck was a rogue member of the FBI who wanted the money for himself and even kidnapped Amber, Cane and Carson. Once they were rescued, Daniel, Kevin and Amber were arrested.

However, Kevin's brother and lawyer, Michael Baldwin, had the charges against them dropped. All of this commotion caused Daniel and Lily to end their marriage. Lily then began a relationship with Cane, while Daniel soon began a flirtation with A.D.A. Heather Stevens, after she began to show her more sensitive side, which was a big deal considering that she was attempting to prosecute him, Kevin and Amber. She also managed to send his mother to prison for extortion, although she was released after two months. After Daniel threw Heather a party to cheer her up in the midst of her court cases, and he and a drunken Amber had sex.

Since the encounter made their living together awkward, Amber moved out. However, the two were unable to stay away from each other, and they had sex again, which ended with Daniel discovering that Amber had kept some of the stolen money that they got from Plum. Although she tried to convince him and Kevin to keep it, they decided to burn it. Daniel then got Amber a job at his mom, Nicholas Newman, Jack Abbott, and Sharon Newman's new magazine Restless Style. While at the launch party for the magazine, Amber helped convince Daniel to mend the rift between him and his father, Danny Romalotti, who came to perform at the event. He and Amber then began an actual relationship. Daniel's father offered him a job on his tour as an assistant photographer, which Daniel accepted.

Daniel returned home on July 10, 2008, and he found out from his girlfriend, Amber, that his mother, Phyllis Summers Newman, had been trying to break them up by making Amber believe that Daniel had been cheating on her. Soon after, she informed him that she had sex with Adrian Korbel out of inadequacy, whereupon he angrily and suddenly broke up with her and left her apartment, much to her devastation. He struggled to get over the break-up via rebound dates with Colleen Carlton. On October 15, 2008, Amber and Daniel got back together. In early 2009, Daniel started his painting and drawing with Amber at his side as a fashion designer. In mid 2009, Daniel was asked to make a fake copy of a 'Terroni,' and he would get paid a sum of money for it. Later, it is believed that he and Jana Hawkes, Kevin's wife, killed the man who asked him to do this in an alley. Daniel managed to stay out of jail long enough to meet Deacon Sharpe, Amber's ex-lover and father of Amber's adopted child, Eric Sharpe, when she was in Los Angeles. Then, Daniel was put in jail, leaving Amber to get him out of jail herself. While Daniel was in jail, he received a phone call from Deacon, claiming to be Michael, Daniel's lawyer. On the other end, he heard Amber and Deacon having sex. When Amber visited him later, he yelled at her, asking her why she did that and what was he supposed to do now that he was going to propose to her. Amber and Daniel consequently broke up. Daniel was soon released, due to the DVD that Deacon sent to the A.D.A, Heather Stevens.

On September 14, 2009, Daniel proposed to Amber, calling her his "soul mate". Two months later, he and Amber were finally married. The couple ignored the fact that the date was Friday the 13th, which was often associated with bad luck. Their marriage began to fall apart over Amber's obsession of her adoptive son, Eric Forrester Sharpe, and Daisy Callahan's personal obsession with Daniel. Daisy was the daughter of Sheila Carter and Tom Fisher, making her Kevin's half-sister. She drugged and had sex with a barely conscious Daniel, who thought he was having sex with his wife, Amber, while her aunt, Sarah Smythe, posing as Lauren Fenmore, attempted to kill Phyllis on another scheme with Patty Williams, who was posing as Dr. Emily Peterson. Amber then realized that Daniel didn't betray her. However, her fear over Eric's safety led to her abandoning him, and therefore ending their marriage. Amber left Genoa City with Eric in tow, and a heartbroken Daniel finally gave up on their marriage. Daniel decided not to give up on his friendship with Jana Hawkes just because she and Kevin were getting a divorce. Jana was touched by Daniel's kind words.

Soon after, Daniel began a flirtation with a now grown-up, Abby Newman. In October 2010, a powerful storm hit Genoa City, and Daniel decided to help a worried Abby look for her mother, Ashley Abbott. When the storm became too much, the two took shelter at Crimson Lights. Daisy then returned to town, pregnant with Daniel's daughter. Phyllis did not believe that the pregnancy was possible, and she ordered a paternity test. It was confirmed that Daniel was the father; however, he did not take the news well. He ultimately agreed to have Daisy stay with him until the baby was born, which caused friction between him and Kevin, who planned to become the baby's guardian once she was born, being that the baby would be his niece.

On New Year's Eve, Daniel searched for Daisy when she went into labor and escaped from Jana, who was supposed to be driving her to the hospital. He ultimately found her on the side of the road, stopped on her way to Canada and about to give birth. He helped her deliver their baby girl. As Daniel was holding his daughter, Daisy took a flashlight and hit Daniel over the head with it. He was later found and taken to the hospital for his injuries inflicted by Daisy. A few days later, Daniel was released and brought home.

Meanwhile, Abby was sent to rehab by her parents, Victor Newman and Ashley Abbott, in order for her to keep her mouth shut about the truth regarding Tucker McCall's accident. Upon returning to Genoa City from rehab, Abby tried to reconnect with Daniel, since they both got caught up in their own lives and grew apart. Diane Jenkins arranged for paparazzi to come to GloWorm, where Daniel and Abby were talking. Daniel thought that Abby set the entire thing up as a publicity stunt for her alter ego, the "Naked Heiress". He told her that what they had was over because he didn't want to deal with her constant need for attention. In February 2011, Daniel found out from a DNA test that Billy and Victoria Abbott's baby daughter, Lucy Abbott, was his biological child. Daisy left her baby in a safe house after she knocked Daniel out. The couple who found the baby gave it to Primrose DeVille in exchange for money. Primrose worked on the black market, selling abandoned children to couples who could afford to skip the adoption process. When Victoria found out that she could not have any more children, Billy decided to adopt a baby girl from Primrose for her, and he paid $2 million for their daughter, Lucy. Upon seeing Lucy, Daniel knew that she was his daughter, which was confirmed after the DNA test. Daniel wasn't sure whether he would let her be raised by Billy and Victoria or if he would file for custody of her. He decided in the end that it was better for Lucy to have Billy and Victoria as her parents because he saw how much that they love her. He did, however, confide in his friend and ex-wife, Lily Ashby, as they have both lost someone that they loved in a way. Being that Lily lost her husband, Cane Ashby, who faked his own death in order to protect Lily and their twins, and Daniel lost his daughter, although that choice was his own.

In May 2011, Lucy and Delia Abbott, Billy's daughter with his ex-wife Chloe Mitchell, were kidnapped by Lucy's nanny, Jana Hawkes. Daniel came clean to both Billy and Victoria about being Lucy's biological father. Daniel then signed away his parental rights, despite the objections of an angry and outraged Phyllis, who wanted custody of Lucy herself, now that she knew that Billy got the baby off the black market. Daniel tried to reason with his mother that he was doing the right thing and that Lucy was with parents that love her. Phyllis, however, refused to listen to Daniel, and she vowed to fight for custody of her granddaughter. On June 17, 2011, Daisy was awarded custody of Lucy with the judge overruling the Abbott's adoption. Daniel was livid at his mother for what she did, and he disowned her. On July 7, 2011, Daniel kissed Lily at Jimmy's Bar, not knowing that Cane was watching. On August 18, 2011, Lily helped Daniel celebrate his birthday with her brother, Devon Winters, Noah Newman and his friend Hunter, and Kevin and his "sister" (Michael Baldwin's half sister who Kevin treats as a sister), Eden Baldwin, at Jimmy's Bar. Lily then took Daniel back to the Athletic Club where she rented a room for the two of them, making it clear that she wanted to pursue a romantic relationship with him. While they were half-naked and making out on the bed, Lily began to flash back to her life with Cane, and she told Daniel that she couldn't have sex with him, and she walked out.

The next day, Lily went to Daniel's apartment to apologize for leading him to believe that she wanted something that she really wasn't sure that she wanted. During their heartfelt talk, the two got caught up in the moment and had sex. Daniel told her that he wasn't expecting it, but it just felt right, and she agreed with him. However, Daniel hurt his budding relationship with Lily when he told her father, Neil, that Lily was allowing Cane to visit their children again. Neil then berated Lily for allowing Cane back into her life. Angered that Daniel would tattle on her to her father, she told him that she wanted him to stay away from her. Cane and Lily would later reunite, much to Daniel's dismay. On November 8, 2011 Daniel finds out from Daisy that Avery Bailey Clark is his aunt. Unhappy over Lily's decision to stay with Cane despite his warnings, Daniel turns to Eden Baldwin, who is unhappy over her former boyfriend Noah Newman not wanting to be with her anymore, as a shoulder to cry on. Both talk about their broken relationships, and their friendship becomes something more.

Daniel then finds himself being a source of comfort and support to Chloe Mitchell after Kevin is forced to leave her at the altar, no thanks to a mobster's daughter named Angelina, who has a major crush on Kevin. Daniel continues to be Chloe's shoulder to cry on when she finds out that Kevin is not only back in town but also married to Angelina. Chloe goes to the party being held in their honor at Gloworm and slaps Kevin in the face, leaving him devastated. She then leaves with Daniel. Daniel, with help from Angelina, get Kevin and Chloe back together and watches them marry on March 27, 2012.

Daniel then finds himself in a difficult position when he discovers that Daisy wants custody of Lucy. Phyllis evens goes as far as hiring Ricky Williams to get close to Daisy so that whatever information he gets from her can be used against her in the custody hearing. It proves, however, not to work as Daisy wins custody of Lucy, and Daniel is forced to wait six months before he can try again. Fearing for his daughter's safety, Daniel proposes to Daisy, who accepts, and the two elope. The marriage proves to be an unhappy one as Daisy is happy to finally have what she wants while Daniel is only married to her for Lucy's sake. Deeply hurt over her husband's unwillingness to love her and his mother's hatred of her, Daisy decides to team up with Ricky Williams to get him to help her and Lucy leave town. However, when Daisy turns up missing, Daniel is the prime suspect despite the fact that Ricky is the one setting him up.

Daniel, despite his ill-will towards Daisy, regrets that she has died for Lucy's sake. He is forced to come to terms with the fact that his mother attempted to kill Paul and Christine in 1994. And on top of all of this, he has begun to develop new feelings for Heather, although things get complicated as she is leading the case against Phyllis. Daniel and Heather ended up kissing several times, which angered Phyllis, calling Daniel a traitor to their family. To appease the public, Daniel and Heather agreed to start dating in private.

After a lengthy period of absence (which according to Christine, is because he went back to Chicago to search for Daisy, who had been residing at Fairview, very much alive, but was recently released), Daniel returned to Genoa City and announced that he and Heather would be moving with Lucy to Savannah, Georgia. Daniel made his last appearance on January 3, 2013. Daniel returned six months later, in July 2013, when Phyllis fell into a coma. He made known his intentions to take Phyllis to a facility outside of Savannah where she would be taken care of; despite resistance from Avery, Phyllis' loved ones eventually agree to let Daniel take his mother back with him to Georgia.

Since then, Daniel has been mentioned infrequently whenever characters go to visit Phyllis in Georgia. Most recently, after Phyllis awoke from her coma and escaped her treatment facility, Jack Abbott called Daniel to clue him in. In August 2016, Daniel briefly returned to Genoa City to attend the engagement party of his half-sister Summer Newman and her fiance Luca Santori, before their engagement was called off when it was revealed by Victoria's boyfriend Travis Crawford that Luca was responsible for the destruction of the oil rigs owned by Newman Enterprises, and Luca was arrested for that crime and sent to prison. He also met Cassie's long-lost twin sister Mariah Copeland, and he told her of how he was involved in Cassie's death. He later also visited his old friend Kevin before he left town again to go back to Savannah, GA, and gave him advice about his rekindled relationship with Chloe and also met her daughter Bella.

== Reception ==
In 2023, Charlie Mason and Richard Simms from Soaps She Knows wrote that Daniel and Lily's rekindled romance had the "Most Potential" in American soap operas of that year, writing, "From the moment Daniel returned to Genoa City, it was pretty obvious that Young & Restless was going to give his pairing with Lily another try. And we're so glad they did! The chemistry shared by Michael Graziadei and Christel Khalil is off the charts, and throwing Heather into the mix shows real potential".

== See also ==
- Daniel and Lily
