= Christine Blair =

Fictional character from The Young and the Restless

- The Young and the Restless character
- Portrayed by: Lauralee Bell
- Duration: 1983–2007; 2010–present
- First appearance: July 15, 1983
- Created by: William J. Bell
- Introduced by: H. Wesley Kenney (1983); Bradley Bell (2007, 2024); Maria Arena Bell and Paul Rauch (2010)
- Crossover appearances: The Bold and the Beautiful
In-universe information
- Other names: Christine Romalotti; Christine Williams; Christine Marie Ellen Blair; Kelly Simmons
- Occupation: Genoa City district attorney
- Parents: Jim Grainger; Jessica Blair Grainger
- Siblings: Scott Grainger, Sr.
- Spouse: Danny Romalotti (1990–1994, 2025–present); Paul Williams (1996–2001, 2013–2023)
- Nieces and nephews: Scotty Grainger
- First cousins: Joe Blair

Christine Blair is a fictional character from The Young and the Restless, an American soap opera on the CBS network, portrayed by Lauralee Bell, the daughter of series creators William J. Bell and Lee Phillip Bell. "Cricket" (as the character was originally called) was introduced in 1983 as a teen model, developing into a lawyer and district attorney. In 2001, Bell asked to be moved to recurring status after maternity leave, though she returned to regular status the following year. In 2005, she returned to recurring for another year. In 2007, the character was brought over to The Bold and the Beautiful by executive producer Bradley Bell, the actress' real-life brother, for a short-term stint, returning to The Young and the Restless in 2010, where she continues to make recurring appearances.

Christine has been married to rock singer Danny Romalotti (Michael Damian), a union that lasted four years until he left her to be with Phyllis Summers (Michelle Stafford), a woman he believed to be pregnant with his child. This sparked an ongoing rivalry between the two women that continues to present time. Later, she became involved with investigator Paul Williams (Doug Davidson) and, although their first marriage ended after five years, they continued as friends. After 12 years apart, Christine and Paul remarried at Katherine Chancellor's funeral. Bell's performance has garnered her a Daytime Emmy Award nomination for Outstanding Supporting Actress in a Drama Series in 2016.

== Casting ==
Beginning in 1983 at the age of fifteen, Lauralee Bell is the sole actress to portray the role. In 1986, she was given a contract. In 2001, after fifteen years as a regular, Bell only made sporadic appearances after returning from a maternity leave. The following year, she returned as a regular for a bigger storyline, though later took another leave of absence, slated to be shorter than the last. She returned in January 2003, remaining as a regular until 2005 when she was bumped back to recurring upon request. She appeared on The Bold and the Beautiful in the episodes dated June 12–21, 2007. In 2008, Bell was asked for a short term reprisal, though declined the offer, explaining she would return if "the show crafts a substantial storyline for her". Bell explained in an interview that she'd "never been pressured so much in the nicest way when [she] was asked to come back".

In 2010, it was announced that Bell would return to The Young and the Restless. Since then, the actress has remained on recurring status.

== Storylines ==
=== 1983–2007 ===
Cricket Blair, the teenage niece of Jabot Cosmetics photographer Joe Blair (John Denos), was introduced as a model for Jabot Cosmetics, and made her way to Genoa City in 1983. She befriended a young Nina Webster (Tricia Cast) and was engaged to Phillip Chancellor III (Thom Bierdz), before she discovered them in bed together. She was forced to grow and toughen up after being raped by Derek Stuart (Ken Olandt). Despite being traumatized, Cricket decided to press charges, which in turn allowed for more victims of Derek to come out. Derek vowed revenge on Cricket and even tried to shoot her, but Scott saved Cricket and took the bullet. Derek tried to escape by jumping through a window, but ended up falling to his death. This experience moved Cricket away from modeling to pursue a legal career. She also abandoned the nickname "Cricket" for her full first name, Christine.

While working at the Whitman, Walker, and Wilson firm, she was sexually harassed by fellow lawyer Michael Baldwin (Christian LeBlanc). She taped their conversations and got him fired, which only pushed Michael to stalk her and eventually kidnap her, then hold her captive for days before she was rescued by Paul Williams (Doug Davidson) and Nathan Hastings (Randy Brooks). Michael was put in prison. Christine found love again in Scott Grainger Sr. (Peter Barton) and they even got engaged, but it turned that they shared a father and the relationship ended.(The Paul Grainger as Cricket's brother storyline was before Michael Baldwin)

Christine and Danny Romalotti's (pictured) marriage was thwarted by Phyllis Summers.

In 1990, Christine married her longtime friend Danny Romalotti (Michael Damian), but their marriage ended when Danny cheated on her with a fan of his, Phyllis Summers (Michelle Stafford), who became pregnant. Years later, it was discovered that the baby – Daniel Romalotti – was not Danny's biological son. Also, it was learned that Phyllis drugged Danny and made him think they had slept together. Christine's business life, on the other hand, was quite successful. She defended many residents of the town and accompanied Paul Williams on various adventures, including one where they traveled to Vietnam to find Jack Abbott's long-lost son, Keemo Volien. The two fell in love and planned to get married, but were prevented by Phyllis, who ran them over in December 1994, leaving Paul in bad health. Just before the accident, Christine shared a brief kiss with Danny, obliviously enough to make Phyllis jealous. At the time, it was never publicly known that Phyllis ran them over. Christine later discovered this in July 2012 and Phyllis was then prosecuted. As for Christine, she reunited with Danny after the accident, but she ended up choosing to stay with Paul and they were later married by 1996.

With Paul and Christine finally married, the two planned to have children, but their careers ended up taking away time and began to strain their marriage. Once Michael Baldwin returned from prison, he convinced Christine that he was a changed man and she testified for him in court. She and Michael ended up starting up a very successful legal practice. Christine ended up taking up a case in Hong Kong and convinced Paul to come along, but he backed out at the last minute. The case ended up taking months, and when it finished, she was offered a new case in Australia. She turned it down to return to Genoa City to repair her marriage. Yet, when she returned she found Paul in bed with his new client Isabella Braña (Eva Longoria). She took the job in Australia and left. Isabella ended up pregnant but claimed that a brief romance she had with Michael led to the pregnancy. In reality, Paul was the father, but Isabella didn't tell him because she felt that he was still in love with Christine. The truth quickly came out and Paul wanted to be with Isabella to do right by the child. Christine ended up building a romance with Michael.

Michael proudly announced to Paul that he got engaged to Christine, which angered Paul who punched Michael and then forced himself on Christine, although Chris never said no to him. Paul was, at the time, married to Isabella. Several months later, Christine went to see Paul in L.A. and had sex with him, then disappeared for a few weeks, leaving Michael and Paul wondering what's going on. Paul's marriage to Isabella was over when he admitted the truth to her. Christine returned, after a short absence, disguised as Kelly Simmons, keen on finding out more about Isabella. Paul knew the truth and decided to stick with Isabella, while Christine went back to Michael. The two were going to get married, but Michael admitted the truth about plotting with Isabella to ensure Christine stayed away from Paul. Christine, in turn, rushed back to Paul, and they had sex on the beach. Isabella plotted revenge against the couple and made it look like Christine had murdered her, then went to attack Chris in a bathtub. Paul saved Chris, and then they were both saved by Michael.

Christine and Paul moved in together, but decided to part ways when Chris didn't accept Paul's proposal. Chris decided to concentrate on her new job, being a prosecutor, but several months later realized that she didn't like the job. Christine started dating her ex-husband Danny Romalotti again, but he left town before anything more serious could happen. Since then, Christine was only seen working on cases, mainly defending people in trouble, including Daniel Romalotti, Jr. (Michael Graziadei) when he was accused of manslaughter, and she was also seen defending Ridge Forrester (Ron Moss) in Los Angeles.

=== Since 2010 ===
Christine returned to Genoa City in July 2010, unsure whether to stay or go back to Washington, D.C. Her return also coincided with her anniversary with ex-husband Paul Williams. They ended up making love, but Paul realized it was a mistake given that he was now in a relationship with Christine's old friend Nina Webster. Nina actually saw Christine and Paul kiss that night and quickly her romance with Paul was strained, as was her friendship with Christine. Hurting their friendship even more was that Christine knew that the police detective Ronan Malloy was actually Nina's long-lost son. Ronan was actually FBI, working undercover to expose some dirty cops that Nina's other son, Chance Chancellor, was being blackmailed by. Eventually, Ronan shot and killed Chance just as Nina found out about their connection. Yet, a few weeks later it was learned that Chance faked his death and was now in the Witness Protection Agency where only Nina, Paul, Christine, Ronan, and Phillip Chancellor III know the truth about him.

Some months later, Christine returned again when Ronan was sick. Apparently, he was suffering from a liver condition that also plagued his biological father, and was going to need a liver transplant. Thanks to Christine, Chance was able to return and donate his liver to his half-brother. During his return, everyone else, including his grandmother, Jill Abbott Fenmore, Katherine Chancellor, and his former romance, Chloe Mitchell, learn the truth.

Christine returned in November 2011 for a visit, in which she and Paul talk about his son Ricky Williams, and also recollect his psychotic mother, Isabella. Chance reveals to her that he will be working at the Pentagon and that he will be closer to her. Christine, Nina, and Paul decide to confront Ronan and ask him why he refuses to talk to them. He never really gives them a straight answer, but after a one-on-one with Christine, he feels bad about the way he has acted. Christine returns to Washington, D.C., on November 9, 2011.

Christine returned to Genoa City in May 2012 to represent the Department of Justice regarding the case the built against Genevieve Atkinson. Paul confides in her that he believes that Ricky might be like his mother, Isabella. She later has a sexual encounter with Danny Romalotti, who had recently returned to Genoa City as well. She returned to town in July to offer her support to Paul, announcing her decision to take a leave of absence in D.C. to defend Paul in his case of murder against his son, claiming no one else would be able to defend Paul as well as she could. During this time, Christine also learned the truth about Paul's and her car accident in December 1994; Phyllis Summers hit them. Phyllis denied it, but a credit card receipt connected Phyllis to it and later her admitting that she saw Christine and Danny kiss just before the accident gave Phyllis a motive. The trial was called off by the judge.

Paul and Christine ended up beginning another relationship, and Christine decided to stay in Genoa City to become the new district attorney since Michael Baldwin had resigned. On September 3, 2013, Paul and Christine held an impromptu wedding ceremony following Katherine Chancellor's memorial service. Katherine suggested Paul propose in a letter written to him before her death that he received during Katherine's memorial. Paul and Christine marry the same day after brief preparations from close friends.
