= Carolyn Conwell =

American actress (1930–2012)

- Born: May 16, 1930; Chicago, Illinois, U.S.
- Died: October 22, 2012 (aged 82); Long Beach, California, U.S.
- Occupation: Actress
- Years active: 1966–2004

Carolyn Conwell (May 16, 1930 – October 22, 2012) was an American actress.

Conwell studied under Herbert Berghof in New York and Jeff Corey in Los Angeles. She appeared in many theatre productions, including Hamlet and A Streetcar Named Desire. Conwell had three children and resided in Los Angeles. She was best known for playing Mary Williams on The Young and the Restless (1980–2004). She played Mrs. Wiggins in The Big Valley episode “Run of the Savage.”

== Filmography ==
- Torn Curtain (1966) – Farmer's Wife
- The Big Valley (1967–1968, TV Series) – Mrs. Wiggins / Idanell Bowles
- The Boston Strangler (1968) – Irmgard DeSalvo
- Medical Center (1969, TV Series) – Doris Webb
- Nanny and the Professor (1970, TV Series) – Mrs. Parsons
- Adam at 6 A.M. (1970) – Mavis
- The Magnificent Seven Ride! (1972) – Martha
- The Quest (1976, TV Series) – Luana
- Lou Grant (1978, TV Series) – Mrs. Pratt
- Little House on the Prairie (1979, TV Series) – Bess Slade
- General Hospital (1980, TV Series)
- Knots Landing (1980, TV Series) – Hooker
- Cheech & Chong's Next Movie (1980) – Swedish Maid
- The Young and the Restless (1980–2004, TV Series) – Mary Williams (final appearance)
