= Soap opera rapid aging syndrome =

Plot device in television dramas

Soap opera rapid aging syndrome (SORAS) is the practice of accelerating the age of a television or film character (usually a child or teenager) in conflict with the timeline of a series or the real-world progression of time. This allows, for instance, storylines around a pregnancy and birth to be relatively quickly followed by storylines around the travails of that child as a teenager or young adult. This is usually accomplished by recasting the actor playing the part, although in some cases the character is not shown onscreen, only mentioned, until after they have been "rapidly aged".

The process originated (and is most commonly used) in daytime soap operas, though it is also sometimes used in prime time shows. On sitcoms, a newborn infant character is sometimes aged quickly into a kindergartener, for greater comic potential, as was done with the character Chrissy Seaver on Growing Pains in 1990.

The term was coined by Soap Opera Weekly founding editor-in-chief Mimi Torchin in the early days of the magazine, which began publishing in 1989. It is now widely used with regard to the practice in soap operas and is sometimes used as a verb as well ("the character was SORASed"). Torchin has jokingly called it "my one greatest contribution to the world of soap operas."

== Examples ==
The practice of rapidly aging characters dates back to the early years of television soap opera. In As the World Turns, Tom Hughes was born onscreen in 1961. By 1970, he had been to college and fought in the Vietnam War. Subsequent recasting exhibited a reverse phenomenon, keeping him in his 30s for 20 years, with Tom hitting his 40s in the 1990s. Dan Stewart, born onscreen on As the World Turns in 1958, reappeared as a 26-year-old doctor in 1966. A 1993 secret history storyline on All My Children established that lead character Erica Kane had been raped immediately before the series' 1970 debut. In this retcon, Erica represses all memory of the assault until 16-year-old Kendall Hart, the child conceived during the rape and put up for adoption by Erica, appears in 1993. Viewer reaction to the discrepancy created by Erica having a 16-year-old daughter as the result of a 24-year-old rape prompted the series to immediately adjust Kendall's age to 23.

On the sitcom Growing Pains, the character Chrissy Seaver was born in October 1988. She was an infant for the remainder of season four (1988–1989) and a toddler (played by twin sisters Kelsey and Kirsten Dohring) in season five (1989–1990). However, for the final two seasons (6–7), Chrissy was rapidly aged to five. She was played by seven-year-old Ashley Johnson.

The repeated use of SORAS on Days of Our Lives led to characters Tom Horton and his great-great-grandson Scotty Banning both working as doctors in the same hospital at the same time.

Jersey Boys uses SORAS for Frankie Valli's daughter, Francine. Through the first three quarters of the musical and film, she ages in real time with the narrative, then jumps several years ahead while the story remains in the late 1960s, to the point that her 1980 death occurs at roughly the same time of the narrative as Valli's 1967 hit solo record "Can't Take My Eyes Off You".

== See also ==
- Floating timeline
