= Jessica Heap =

American actress

- Occupation: Actress
- Years active: 2008–2013

Jessica Heap is an American former actress. She is perhaps best known for her portrayal of Eden Baldwin on the CBS soap opera The Young and the Restless. She has also appeared on various television series including CSI: Miami. In addition to television, Heap has made appearances in the films Battle: Los Angeles, Sinners and Saints, I Love You Philip Morris, Death Toll, and Spring Break '83, as well as in the made-for-television films Fab Five: The Texas Cheerleader Scandal and Journey to Promethea.

== Career ==
=== The Young and the Restless ===
In June 2011, it was announced that Heap had been cast in the role of Eden Baldwin, a character previously portrayed by Vanessa Marano. Of her first day, Heap said: "When I worked my first day, I was shooting two episodes, all back to back. So it was a lot of dialogue, a lot of material and it really helped having someone there who was like 'Here's what's happening,' as it was going on. For me, I'm just loving it, because I’m learning from people like Christian and these other great actors and I’m learning new skills." After a year in the role, it was announced that Heap was to exit the soap. The actress later confirmed her departure on Twitter, saying she'd completed filming and described her experience on the show as "an unforgettable ride".

== Filmography ==
List of acting credits in film and television
| Title | Year | Role | Notes |
|---|---|---|---|
| Meet The Spartans | 2008 | Spartan woman's Friend | Uncredited |
| Death Toll | 2008 | Councilman McGraw's assistant | |
| Fab Five: The Texas Cheerleader Scandal | 2008 | Jeri Blackburn | TV movie |
| College | 2008 | College Girl #2 | |
| Mutants (USA) | 2008 | Hannah | |
| Abduction of Jesse Bookman | 2008 | Bartender | |
| The Grapevine | 2008 | Beatrice Clooney | Short |
| Middle of Nowhere | 2008 | Justine Spitz | |
| I Love You Philip Morris | 2009 | Secretary | |
| Terrebonne | 2010 | Jean Mauriere | Short |
| Journey to Promethea | 2010 | Aria | TV movie |
| Sinners and Saints | 2010 | Becky | |
| Trance | 2010 | Paula | Horror film |
| Battle: Los Angeles | 2011 | Jessy | |
| CSI: Miami | 2011 | Corinne Palmer | TV series, 1 episode: "Paint It Black" |
| Mardi Gras: Spring Break | 2011 | Casamento Girl | |
| Spring Break '83 | 2011 | Hottie #2 | |
| The Young and the Restless | 2011–13 | Eden Baldwin | TV soap opera, role from: June 28, 2011 – January 31, 2013 |
