= Jill Abbott =

Fictional character from The Young and the Restless

- The Young and the Restless character
- Jess Walton as Jill Abbott
- Portrayed by: Brenda Dickson (1973–1980, 1983–1987); Bond Gideon (1980); Deborah Adair (1980–1983, 1986); Melinda O. Fee (1984); Jess Walton (1987–present); Judith Chapman (1994); Lauren Koslow (2026)
- Duration: 1973–present
- First appearance: March 27, 1973
- Created by: William J. Bell
- Introduced by: William J. Bell and John Conboy (1973, 1980); William J. Bell and H. Wesley Kenney (1983–1984, 1986); William J. Bell and Edward J. Scott (1987, 1994); Sally McDonald (2026)
In-universe information
- Other names: Jill Atkinson; Jill Fenmore; Jill Foster
- Occupation: Businesswoman; Beautician; Paid companion
- Parents: Neil Fenmore
- Adoptive parents: Bill Foster; Liz Foster
- Brothers: Snapper Foster (adoptive); Greg Foster (adoptive)
- Half-sisters: Lauren Fenmore
- Husband: Brock Reynolds (1975); Phillip Chancellor II (1975); Stuart Brooks (1978); Derek Thurston (1978); John Abbott (1982–1986, 1993–1996); Rex Sterling (1990); Colin Atkinson (2011, 2014–2019)
- Children: Phillip Chancellor III; Billy Abbott
- Grandchildren: Chance Chancellor; Delia Abbott; Johnny Abbott; Katie Newman; Ruby Spectra-Abbott
- Uncles: Bruce Henderson (adoptive)
- Nieces and nephews: Chuckie Roulland (adoptive); Jennifer Foster (adoptive); Scotty Grainger; Fenmore Baldwin
- First cousins: Mark Henderson (adoptive); Lorie Brooks (adoptive)

Jill Abbott is a fictional character from the American CBS soap opera The Young and the Restless. The longest-running and only remaining original character, Jill was created and introduced by William J. Bell. Originally portrayed by Brenda Dickson, when Dickson departed in 1980, the role was first recast with Deborah Adair. Dickson returned in 1983 and, although she stated that she would never leave the role again, she was replaced by Jess Walton in 1987, who continues in the role to present time.

When she debuted, Jill was an 18-year-old manicurist working to support her struggling family. The character is known for her rivalry with Katherine Chancellor (Jeanne Cooper), which is the longest feud in the history of American soap operas. Their rivalry began when she fell in love and had sex with Katherine's husband Phillip Chancellor II (Donnelly Rhodes) and became pregnant. Following Phillip's accidental death, the women fought over custody of Jill's son, Phillip Chancellor III (Thom Bierdz), as well as numerous of Katherine's other husbands. A 2003 plot twist shockingly revealed Jill to be Katherine's long lost biological daughter, although in 2009, former head writer Maria Arena Bell rewrote their history, reversing that decision. In 2010, Jill discovered she is the daughter of Neil Fenmore (Jim Storm).

The character is considered an icon on the soap opera, and has been described as an integral part of the series. Both Dickson and Walton have characterized her as "manipulative". Walton, who classes her as a "savvy businesswoman", has opined she is similar to Gone with the Wind character Scarlett O'Hara. Critics have described her as both vindictive and a vixen. John Goudas of The Miami News said that the show "flourishes when her character takes center stage," while Nekeeta Borden of Zap2it noted that Jill has always craved a sense of belonging despite her personality. Walton's portrayal has been met with acclaim, having garnered her two Daytime Emmy Award wins.

== Casting ==
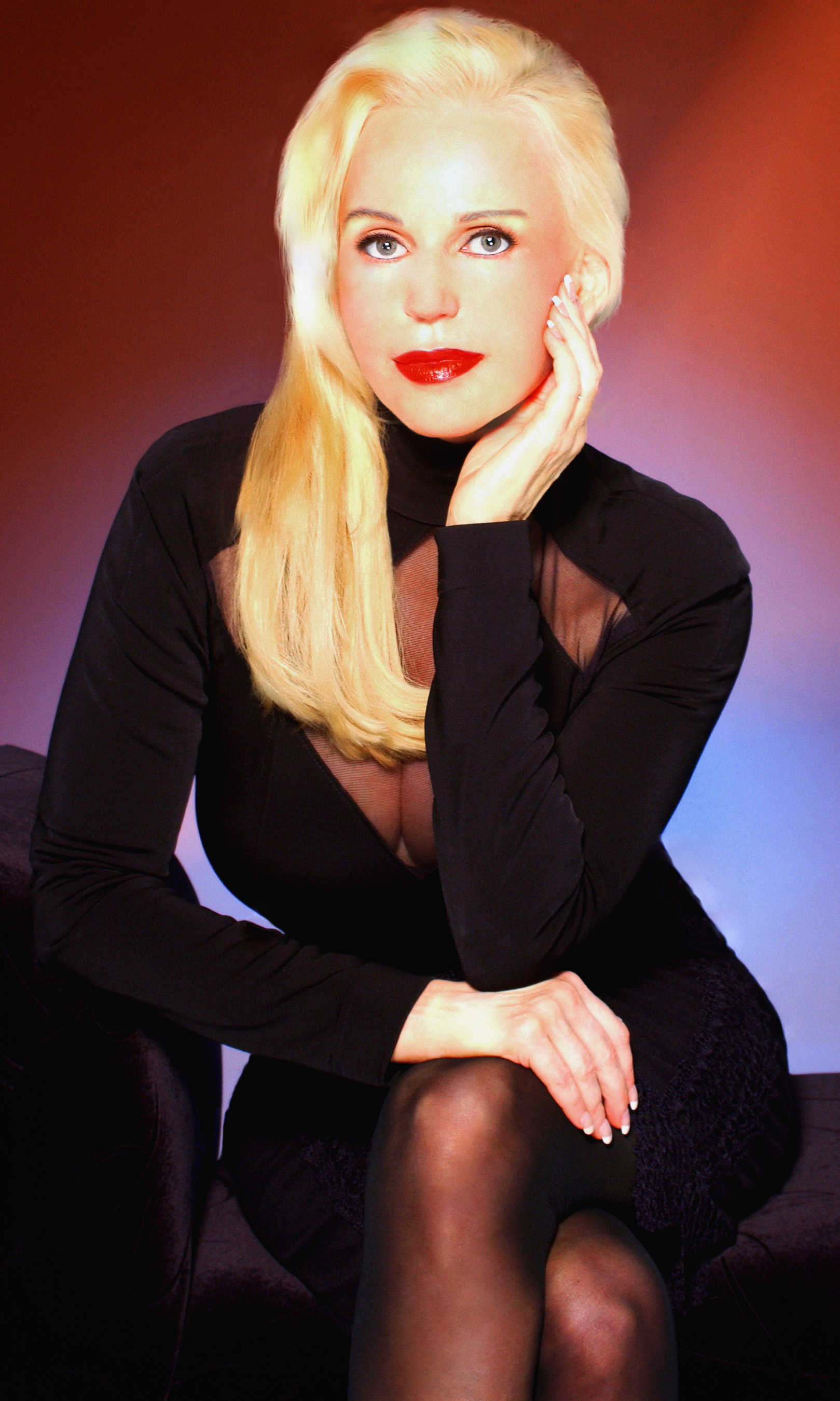
Brenda Dickson originated the role of Jill

Dickson debuted as the character on the second episode of the series. Footage of Dickson as Jill appears in the film Taxi Driver. On January 9, 1980, Dickson left the role. In May 1980, Bond Gideon briefly took over before Adair portrayed the character for an additional three years, from 1980 to 1983. Dickson returned to the role on September 8, 1983. Melinda Fee served a temporary recast also in 1984, and Adair briefly reprised the role in 1986 as a fill-in for Dickson. In 1987, when asked if she would ever leave the character of Jill again, Dickson stated: "I'm planning to branch out, maybe even a miniseries. But [that] only means shooting here at night to fill in. I can't give up Jill. I'm having too much fun with her. Besides, it's all so easy." Despite this, Dickson was later replaced by Walton: first serving as a temporary replacement on June 19, 1987; then as a permanent recast airing on June 25, 1987. Dickson briefly vacated the role on June 18, 1987, due to illness. Dickson returned on June 22, 1987 and ultimately made her final appearance as Jill on June 24, 1987.

In March 2009, speculation arose that Walton had taken a medical leave; however, Nelson Branco of TV Guide Canada reported that she had been asked to accept a salary cut and had decided to leave. The soap opera issued a casting call for Jill, describing her as "late '50s, Caucasian, female. This woman is a smart and confident CEO of a successful company. She is a mother and grandmother who wants what is best for her family." However, soon after, Walton was able to sign a new contract to continue her portrayal of Jill. She later clarified her departure as having to do with "family and this economy". She stated: "I felt so bad that so many people have lost their jobs, that, all of a sudden, I thought: 'This is really silly. I have a wonderful job and I really think I owe it to myself and my family to continue on.'" In February 2012, Walton signed a new contract with the soap opera, which would continue her portrayal of the role for an unspecified amount of time. The actress was then announced to be taking a leave of absence beginning that April, slated to last six months. She made her return on November 2, 2012. After her return, Walton announced in an interview with Soap Opera Digest that she had voluntarily dropped to recurring status to allow for more time with her family.

In May 2026, it was announced that Lauren Koslow would temporarily take over the role due to Walton's unavailability caused by a scheduling conflict. Scenes featuring Koslow, who previously appeared on The Young and the Restless as Lindsey Wells, began airing on June 29 of the same year. In an interview with TV Insider, Koslow revealed that she filmed her scenes as Jill alongside her scenes as Kate Roberts on Days of Our Lives.

== Development ==
=== Characterization ===
"There is a basic insecurity that came from her being the housekeeper's daughter. She was around Katherine with her rich society country club friends, and she had this deep feeling of inadequacy, and that is where I think it all stems up."

— Walton, on Jill's insecurity as a person (2010)

Global BC describes Jill as "driven and ambitious". Lilana Novakovich of the Toronto Star stated she was "one mean lady", and later noted her to be manipulative. Dickson was "delighted" when viewers compared Jill to Alexis Colby (Joan Collins) on the television series Dynasty, and believed that Jill could give "lessons in rottenness" to Alexis. While Jill, still portrayed by Dickson, was in a middle of a custody battle for her son, John Goudas of The Miami News said: "Jill is hot again this winter. In a court battling for her son she never gave a darn about, quixotic Jill Foster Abbott gives The Young and the Restless a few heady jolts." Additionally, he described Jill as a "two-timing, self-absorbed, vindictive little witch" who fans always sympathize with. In 1992, Donna Gable of USA Today described Jill as volatile.

In 1994, Walton described her character as, "Very much like a latter-day Scarlett O'Hara. She is very manipulative and feels she is strongly justified in her actions. Jill is an individual who has a lot of difficulty in seeing what she truly is." Additionally, she said that once Jill "she gets a plan in her head, nothing will divert her." In 1998, Walton's co-star Jeanne Cooper described Jill as "Wile E. Coyote". Walton conceded that the analogy is true, saying that Jill is in "constant turmoil". She stated: "She gets the anvil dropped on her head and falls off the cliff. She cries and then tells everyone her new plan and how she's going to rule the world. Then it's off the cliff again." Walton has said that Jill "can be such a shrew" and "gets her happiness where she can, and she certainly is not going to contain her anger. She lets it out, so it does not fester in there. She is on a roller coaster though, I will say that much." In 2009, Walton stated that she had "really missed Jill being bad", but upon the character crashing Katherine's wedding to Patrick Murphy (Michael Fairman), she said that "this is pretty bad". Walton stated in an interview in 2003 that she does like portraying the "dark side" of Jill, but rather her comedic side. She also described Jill as being "so strong" and "such a survivor".

Jill is known as a businesswoman, after working as a manicurist during her youth. Walton has said that she wants to see Jill's business side incorporate into the storyline more, stating: "That's what Jill has always done, and she does it well. She was a really successful businesswoman. Jill did a lot of foolish things, but she was a savvy businesswoman." Additionally, Walton described Jill's business as the "core of the whole character", stating: "Jill is really a part of me – this is a unique job in that part of me does live as Jill, and I know Jill is a very savvy businesswoman."

=== Relationships ===
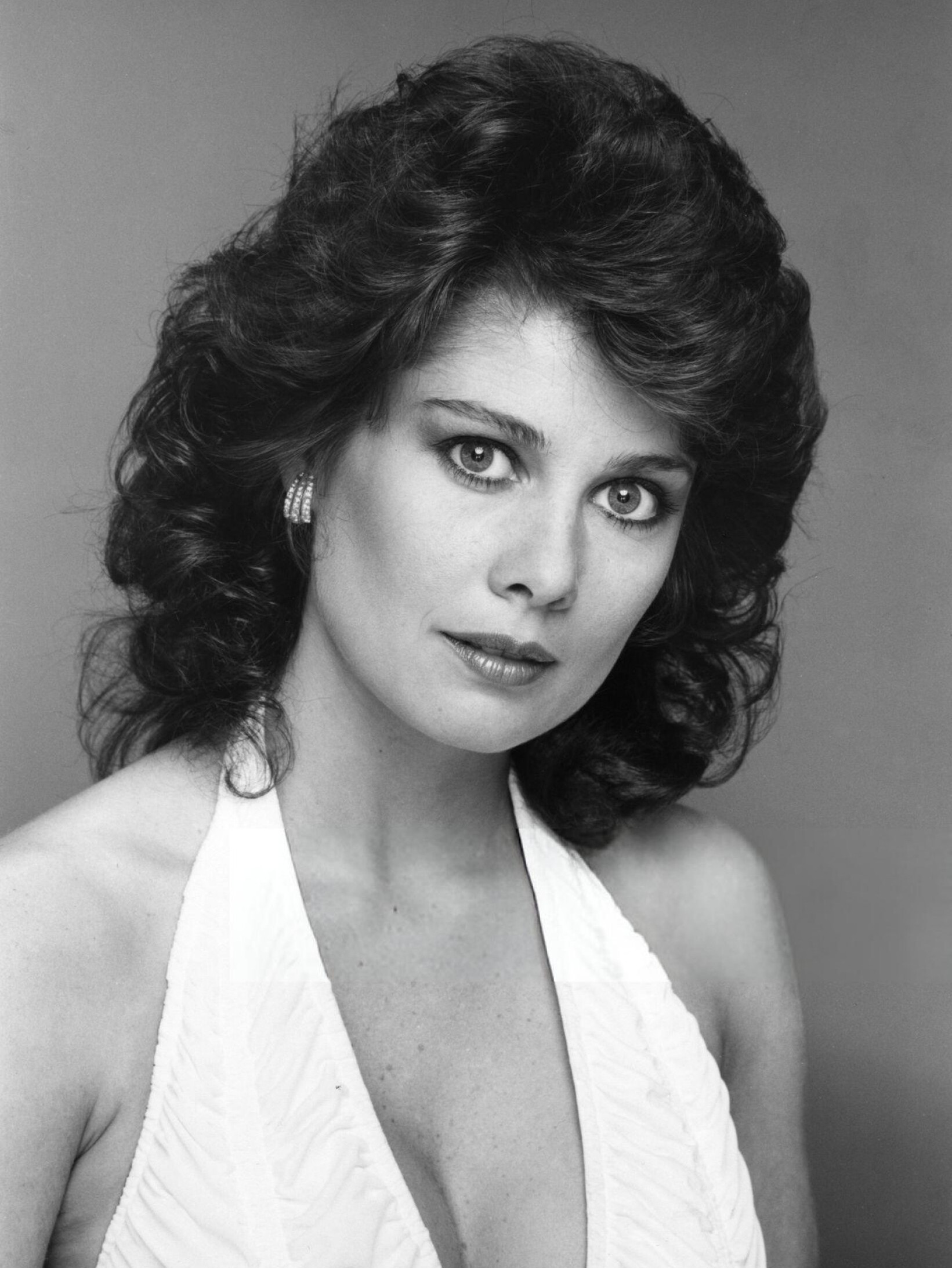
Jill's relationship with John Abbott began when Deborah Adair (pictured) was portraying the role of Jill.

Walton said that "Jill is attracted to powerful men" but is a "bossy little lady" who isn't going to "buckle under" to them. She romanced many of Katherine's husbands, including Rex Sterling (Quinn Redeker). Walton said that their romance was "great" but "he only fell in love with her because the real Katherine had been spirited away and a fake Katherine was in her place". Walton described Jill's romance Sean Bridges (David Lee Russek), who was a young web designer, as a "boy toy". Jill is known for infidelity, Nekeeta Borden of Zap2it noted that she has had sex with Katherine's husbands and had an affair with Jack Abbott (Peter Bergman) while she was married to his own father, John Abbott (Jerry Doulgas). Former head writer Kay Alden called her affair with Jack "massive" and it was "devastating to both of them" when it broke up her marriage to John. Lydna Hirsch of Sun Sentinel noted that after the affair, John threw Jack out of the house and divorced Jill; he forgave them years later but it took "Jack being paralyzed and Jill dealing with the death of her son Philip to get him to come around". Several years later, Walton said that John was one of the character's "best matches" because "Jill had a real love and respect for him – I just don't think she had the physical passion for him so she got restless." Of her relationship with ex-con Larry Warton (Shark Fralick), Walton said: "Larry Warton was hilarious; he was really, really fun. I loved doing that, because that was almost all comedy, all the time."

After years of not having a relationship, Jill has a brief romance with district attorney William Bardwell (Ted Shackelford) in 2007, which ends when Gloria Abbott (Judith Chapman) schemes to have him for herself. She later has a relationship with businessman Ji Min Kim (Eric Steinberg), who became her fiancé, however, he was murdered before they were able to marry. Jill's most recent relationship was with Cane Ashby's (Daniel Goddard) father, Colin Atkinson (Tristan Rogers). He had a criminal past, angering Katherine, who was protective of Jill. Allison Waldman of AOL TV wrote: "Is he sincere, or is Colin just using Jill to get to Cane?" Jill accepted his "insane marriage offer" and considered eloping. Walton said that Colin was a "good match" for Jill and she hoped that she could "reform" him. Amid everyone telling Jill that she should stay away from Colin, Walton said: "She's only seeing the good in him. I really believe there's a real love between those two, and we're playing it like there is." Their marriage was later declared invalid after Genevieve Atkinson (Genie Francis) revealed that she and Colin were still married.

=== Feud with Katherine ===
Jill is known for her feud with Katherine Chancellor (Jeanne Cooper), which took place over four decades. BuddyTV wrote that, "Nothing spells rivalry like the on-going feud between Jill Foster Abbott and Katherine Chancellor." In 1993, Katherine was diagnosed with breast cancer and shared several tender scenes with Jill. Nancy Reichardt of the Los Angeles Times noted that the characters were acting out of character; she wrote: "Katherine's breast cancer scare was touching and seeing Katherine and Jill come together added an intriguing new dimension to their relationship. To confuse us, the show has thrown out this budding friendship as if it never happened. How much more moving it would have been if these two women faced Katherine's request for Jill to name her child Phillip as former adversaries trying to put the past behind them instead of as bitter enemies of days gone by." Of working with Cooper, Walton has stated: "I thank God every day for that woman. She feeds me. She is like a shot in the arm when you see her in the morning. She is funny and sharp and I love her."

In 2003, Katherine and Jill were believed to be mother and daughter after Katherine's friend, Charlotte Ramsey, provided factual proof. Of the storyline, Walton stated: "She's [Abbott] going down a bad road. In looking back over the past 16 years, she's gone down a lot of bad roads, for a lot of different reasons. She'll survive this one and, hopefully, maybe this time she'll learn something from it." She also described Jill as being in a "soul-searching period" during the storyline, saying: "Now she's numbing herself with the alcohol because all those feelings of love are coming up for her mother, and she doesn't know how to deal with them." Walton said she felt Jill had been "shaken to the very foundation" upon the revelation that Katherine is her mother, stating: "A big part of who she has been all these years has to do with her anger towards Katherine. She always shoved any feeling of love down. Now, she's questioning everything about herself. That's why she is in such pain and why she is drinking. That hate thing is baseless now." While admitting to having been surprised with the maternity revelation, Walton thought it was "fabulous and rich, and it's opened up a whole new facet to the story". However, in 2009, the characters' history was rewritten by Maria Arena Bell; Charlotte had made up this information for revenge against Katherine, and they were not mother and daughter.

A writer from the Jamaica Gleaner noted that viewers had been getting restless with Jill's newfound closeness to Katherine, noting that, "Katherine and Jill are at their best when they are at each other's throats." Of the storyline where she returned to Jabot Cosmetics, Cooper stated: "Since I went back into the business of business, I've been taking away some of Jill's power. You wanna go broke? Leave your company in the hands of Jill! The other day, we were filming some confrontational scenes, and Jess [Walton] says, 'Doesn't it feel good?' And the crew is like: 'Good! The girls are at it again!'" Lilana Novakovich of The Record noted that the rivalry between the two women has "outlived most marriages". Cooper stated: "The audience – both young and old – relate to the Kay/Jill relationship". Walton describes their relationship as "incredible" and said: "The love and the hate is so mixed, and there is never any telling when it will bubble out now. It used to be, “This month I like her... this month I hate her.” Now, it's more from moment to moment."

=== Paternal discovery ===
In June 2010, when Jill's adoptive mother, Liz Foster (Julianna McCarthy), died, it was then learned that her biological father was Neil Fenmore. Walton stated: "Liz was the dream mother for Jill. She always could handle Jill." During an interview with On-Air On-Soaps speaking about how her character has been thrown in different directions, Walton said: "It used to bother me. I would try and keep a steady course with it, and now I can't. Now I just roll with the punches. It's impossible." Walton noted that Jill was finally happy to have a blood relative through Neil's other daughter, Lauren Fenmore (Tracey E. Bregman). She said: "Liz dies within a week and all of a sudden it's, 'I am a Fenmore'. And we really didn't have a chance to explore it much, but in real life that happens. My first thought as Jill is, 'I actually know who my blood is, and I have a sister.' And, Jill was very moved and touched and shocked from the death of Liz, but full of love for her sister." On her relationship with Lauren, Walton stated that, "Most people don't like Jill, and she hasn't particularly loved Lauren. I have never had that much to do with Lauren, really." Nekeeta Borden of Zap2it noted: "The redhead told Jill in no uncertain terms that she intended to keep her father's memory, and only child status, firmly intact and had no interest in a close relationship." Borden also noted that Jill always wanted a sense of belonging, which prompted her to legally change her name to Jill Fenmore. The sisters were initially bitter towards each other having to share half of the Fenmore Boutique, but have since gotten closer. Walton said that, "From my point of view, I think that Lauren has a really big heart; she's a naturally lovely person. Lauren was really awful a few times, and that just came out of her pain. So, it looks like Lauren and Jill are kind of getting along okay, but there's nothing else coming up in the scripts for them yet."

=== Heart disease ===
"My character thinks she's invincible, super-strong, super-tough and doesn't want to show any weaknesses. A lot of people are like that (...) They have ostrich syndrome; they want to bury their head in the sand so they don't hear anything they don't want to know. She tried taking it lightly and cavalierly, but then it starts to sink in and get serious."

— Walton describing Jill's response to her diagnosis (2017)

In February 2017, after learning that her husband Colin stole her life savings (millions of dollars), Jill suffers from a near-fatal heart attack. In the weeks leading up to this, she had been experiencing feelings of warmth and jaw aching. Nancy Brown of The Huffington Post noted: "In typical fashion, she blamed the warmth on others keeping the heat turned up and dismissed the jaw pain to likely grinding her teeth at night." She is subsequently diagnosed with heart disease and blocked arteries, something she struggles to accept.

The storyline idea was developed by head writer and co-executive producer Sally Sussman Morina. For this storyline, the soap opera partnered with the American Heart Association in order to highlight the issue of women's heart health. Executive producer Mal Young felt that the character of Jill was the "perfect choice to show how a woman's life can dramatically change as a result of heart disease." He further mentioned that "Along with providing us with some very emotional and dramatic episodes, the subject also gives us the opportunity to educate and highlight a very pertinent issue using characters our viewers know well. As well as seeing how it affects Jill as she comes to terms with her condition, the story will also illustrate how it impacts her family and those closest to her." The producers considered Jill to be the right character to tackle this issue due to her being the show's longest-running character, as well as other factors: her unhealthy lifestyle, age and "bullish personality that would deny anything was wrong". Following the episode where Jill is diagnosed, Walton appeared in a public service announcement urging viewers to visit the American Heart Association website. Young knew that the soap opera had to be "very responsible", stating: "We did not want to sensationalize this. We wanted to get the facts in while at the same time telling a good, dramatic story."

== Storylines ==
=== Backstory ===
Jill Foster was born in Genoa City, Wisconsin. She is raised by her mother, Liz Foster, and her two older brothers, Snapper (William Gray Espy) and Greg (James Houghton). The family struggles to make ends meet and things aren't easy when their father, Bill abandons them. Liz Foster worked at Mr Chancellor's factory, and Jill worked at a beauty shop, to help support their family, and put her brothers through college. Jill had aspirations of being a model. In 2003, Jill's birth certificate confirmed the year of her birth as September 29, 1957.

=== 1973–present ===
Jill was working at a beauty shop to help support her family, until a regular at the shop, the wealthy Katherine Chancellor (Jeanne Cooper), hires her as a hairdresser and paid companion. "Jill tolerated Kay's habits of regularly drinking herself into oblivion and smoking to such an extent that her husband Phillip Chancellor, couldn't stand to be near her. Jill pitied Kay, and desperately, wanted to do everything in her power to help her." "All of Jill's many acts of kindness and great patience toward Katherine did not escape Phillip's notice and he became inexorably drawn to the innocent and beautiful young lady." Since Phillip wanted nothing to do with his wife, Kay shamefully carried on with Jeff the stable boy, meanwhile Jill & Phillip Chancellor II were falling deeply in love, even though they were fighting their feelings for each other at every turn. But eventually Phillip and Jill (who was a virgin) gave into their feelings and had sex. It was the only time they had ever sex, but Jill became pregnant. Phillip divorced Kay so he could marry Jill. But "Upon Phillip's return from the Dominican Republic, a stone sober Katherine met him at the airport and offered to drive him home." Kay begged him for a second chance when Phillip refused, Kay purposely drove them off a cliff. As Phillip "lay dying in his hospital bed, he had one last request to make of his beloved Jill:marry him to give their unborn child his name and his fortune!" But after Phillip's death Kay waged an endless round of legal maneuvers, which invalidated Phillip's divorce from her, and his marriage to Jill. So "Jill and her family were evicted from the Chancellor Estate, where they had been living since Phillip's death."

Jill gave birth to Phillip Chancellor II's baby, Phillip Chancellor III (eventually portrayed by Thom Bierdz in 1986), which sets off a rivalry between the ladies that would last for decades. Kay's son, Brock, would try numerous ways to broker a peace between the two of them, but the plans never worked out. Since Katherine had invalidated Jill's marriage, she was left penniless with a newborn infant. Kay offered Jill $1 million for her baby, which she declined. Jill later romances David Mallory, who was the recipient of her late father Bill's eye cornea. However, she never loved him. He proposed, but she declines after Liz warned her of a loveless marriage. She had an affair with Derek Thurston (Joe Ladue) and later romanced Stuart Brooks (Robert Colbert), whose wife Jennifer had just died. He was really in love with her mother Liz, but Jill tricked him into marriage following a one-night stand. He left her after she faked a pregnancy and miscarriage. Jill wanted to reunite with Derek, who marries Katherine after she promised him a salon and a $100,000 trust for Jill's son. Derek's ex-wife Suzanne Lynch (Ellen Weston) arrives in town and wanted him back. Kay was briefly presumed dead and finding himself free of Suzanne and Kay, Derek planned to marry Jill. Kay showed up alive at the wedding and reclaimed her life with Derek.

Jill begins to work for cosmetics company Jabot and its owner, John Abbott (Jerry Douglas), promotes her to head of merchandising, impressed by her work. They become involved, but she cheated on him with his son, Jack Abbott (Terry Lester). John dumped her and she filed a sexual harassment suit worth $10,000 against Jack when he will not be with her. She reunites with John and they married in 1982. However, Abbott family housekeeper, Mamie Johnson (Veronica Redd), seemed to be a thorn in Jill's new marriage. Mamie, who wants to protect John, kept an eye on Jill, who had another affair with Jack. Katherine gets a hold of pictures of Jack and Jill and showed them to John, who has a stroke. Jill divorced John in 1986 and gets 20% of Jabot in their settlement, and a seat on the board of directors after threatening to sell her story turning it into a novel or film. Jill strives at her business, but is later found in her shower having been shot, just as her son Phillip returned to town after years away at boarding school. The three main suspects in the shooting are John, Jack, and Katherine. Jack confesses so that his affair with her won't become public. The real culprit is Sven, a masseur at the Genoa City Hotel. He had been rejected by Jill earlier in the night and shot her after getting drunk. Sven kidnapped Jill and locked her in a meat freezer. Jack rescued her and Sven escaped. Jill and Katherine fight over custody of her son Phillip, who is now a teenager and had a past of acting out. Kay was awarded temporary custody, but she was denied the right to adopt him. So much to Jill's dismay, Phillip III lives his high school years at the Chancellor mansion with Kay. After graduation Kay bought Phillip a shiny red sports car, and has Phillip begin his training as an executive at Chancellor Industries, in hopes he will take over his father's company someday. Phillip turned to alcoholism, but quit with help from Jill and Katherine. Phillip has sex with Nina Webster (Tricia Cast) and she ends up pregnant. He later died after driving under the influence, devastating both women. Jill hired a former con man Rex Sterling (Quinn Redeker) to seduce Katherine. Rex's real name was Brian Romalotti, father of Danny Romalotti (Michael Damian) and Gina Roma (Patty Weaver). He married Katherine, but Jill then wanted Rex for herself and convinced him to divorce Katherine. In reality, Katherine had been replaced by a look alike Marge Cotrooke who pushed Rex away. He divorced her, and married Jill, but the real Katherine finally returned and reunited with Rex. Rex eventually was shot and killed while Jill began romancing John again.

Jill begins an affair with wealthy Victor Newman (Eric Braeden) and was convinced he would ask her to marry him, but he told her it was just a fling. Mortified, she quickly remarried John, much to the dismay of his children. Jill wanted another child, but John felt he was too old. She quickly got pregnant before he had a secret vasectomy. He wanted her to have an abortion but she didn't, and gave birth to Billy Abbott (Billy Miller). John and Jill continuously had arguments and she had an affair with Jed Sanders. Mamie found out and told John, ending the marriage. They had a bitter custody battle, but John suffered another stroke. Mamie confessed her love to John; Jill then paid her millions to leave town. John gained custody of Billy and left for New York. Later, Jill found a letter from Phillip Chancellor II which named her the sole owner of the Chancellor Estate; she evicted Katherine. Katherine found a legal loophole, allowing her to stay on the estate. Billy Abbott and Brock Reynold's teenage daughter MacKenzie Browning began a romance. Jill had a brief romance with a young web designer, Sean Bridges (David Lee Russek). Katherine allowed ex-con Larry Warton (Shark Fralick) to move in for housework, and Jill had an affair with him but kept it secret because of his social class. Katherine found out and confronted Jill, who denied it. Jill even insulted Larry, causing him to show up at a Jabot board meeting and expose the affair.

In 2003, Liz was diagnosed with a brain tumor and admitted to Jill that she was adopted and that Charlotte Ramsey provided proof that she was Katherine's daughter. Everyone was shocked that she is the daughter of her sworn enemy, and Katherine suffered a heart attack. They were forced to break up Billy and Mackenzie from marrying, because them being mother and daughter meant that Mac and Billy are cousins. Jill helped Katherine recover from paralysis and they begin to work out their issues. Four years later, Katherine uncovers repressed memories of kidnapping Phillip III years ago just after he was born and switching him with another baby. Jill refused to believe this at first, DNA testing of the corpse in Phillip III's grave confirms that he was not Jill's biological son. They are led to believe that her true biological son is Ethan "Cane" Ashby (Daniel Goddard), an Australian national whose visa has expired and is fighting deportation. As the true Phillip III, he would be a native-born American citizen and is thus permitted to remain in Genoa City. Cane bonded with Katherine and Jill. She began a romantic relationship with District Attorney William Bardwell (Ted Shackelford), the District Attorney, who has just inherited a fortune from his late uncle. John Abbott's widow Gloria Abbott (Judith Chapman) also wanted Will, and drugged Ji Min Kim (Eric Steinberg) and Jill with libido pills and arranged for William to walk in on them. William married Gloria. Jill developed real feelings for Ji Min develop genuine feelings, they plan to marry. He is murdered in September by David Chow, devastating Jill.

In 2008, Katherine retires as CEO of Chancellor Industries and made Jill her successor. She stepped down and made Cane CEO, angering Billy. In November, Katherine "dies" in a car accident. However, the true victim is her lookalike, Marge Cotrooke. Katherine returned months later alive and is proved to be her by DNA testing. However, the test also uncovers the truth – Jill is not Katherine's biological daughter, and Charlotte Ramsey made this up to get back at Kay. She rejected Katherine's affection despite this, and their feud is reignited. Jill briefly goes broke after a bank in Cayman Islands where she has stored all her money collapsed. It is eventually learned the Cane is not Jill's son, and that Phillip is really alive and had faked his death and told Cane to come to Genoa City and pretend to be Jill's son. It is learned that Phillip is gay. Initially angry, Jill forgives Cane, who she has a bond with. She split her estate three ways between Phillip, Billy, and Cane—despite the fact that Cane is not her son. In June 2010, Liz fell ill again and was dying. Jill reunited with her adoptive brothers Greg and Snapper who returned to town. Liz died in hospital with her children by her side. Snapper ended up telling Jill the truth, Neil Fenmore was her biological father. Jill changed her name to Fenmore and now had access to half of everything Fenmore, including Lauren's boutique. Lauren rejected her and they form a bitter feud; they eventually calmed down and became closer.

Jill became engaged to Australian businessman Colin Atkinson (Tristan Rogers). Unbeknownst to her, he is Cane's biological father and the head of an organized crime syndicate in Australia. Cane was shot and "killed" on the day of her wedding to Colin, however it was actually Caleb (Cane's twin) that died. Jill found out that Colin was married to a woman named Genevieve Atkinson (Genie Francis), Cane's mother. Jill ended things with Colin and he was sent to jail for his crimes. In 2012, Jill leaves town for several months to help Phillip in Australia. Upon her return, she agrees to help Katherine come out of retirement to take control of Chancellor Industries, but Katherine ends up with a brain tumor. She has the tumor successfully removed and leaves town indefinitely with Murphy. Murphy later returns to Genoa City alone, revealing Katherine died while they were away. She leaves Nikki and Jill in charge of her funeral arrangements, and during this time Jill begins trying to figure out cryptic messages left by Katherine in a personal letter to her. Jill expected Katherine to have left everything to her in her will, but she only ends up with the Chancellor Estate, for which she can't afford the upkeep, and a mysterious music box. Jill tries for months to figure out the meaning of the music box and finally decides to sell it online, only to have Esther (Kate Linder) buy it back for her as she believes it truly means something.

Jill is later kidnapped by Colin, who is revealed to have been released from jail. He blackmails her into remarrying him as he alludes that he has information on the music box that Katherine once told him. However, his information ends up being a dead end. After Colin's lies are exposed, Jill locks him in the attic and refuses to let him out until he owns up to his lies, which he eventually does and they patch things up. Almost a year after Katherine's death, Jill finds her most expensive jewelry to have been hidden in a chandelier at the Chancellor Estate. Enclosed with a note, Katherine left them there for Jill to find before her death as they are worth a significant amount. However, the meaning of the music box remains unknown to everyone. Afterward, all of Katherine's loved ones receive letters from her that were to be delivered on the one-year anniversary of her death. She also asks them to throw a party and celebrate, which they do. Once the party in the park is finished, Jill leaves the music box there, only for it to be stolen by an unidentified person. Jill and Colin return soon after to find the box missing, but Colin convinces her to finally let go of it.

Years later, the box was found. This time, a key was found hidden in a secret compartment. It led to Collin finding a safe deposit box with a letter from Katherine and a ring from Phillip for Jill.

== Reception ==
John Goudas of The Miami News noted that following Dickson's return in 1984 following a four-year absence, the soap opera's ratings gained. Goudas praised Dickson, noting that, "Y&R flourishes when her character takes center stage." Jillian Bowe of Zap2it was critical of Dickson's portrayal, stating: "When contemplating the four decades of feuding between Genoa City's grande dame Katherine Chancellor (Jeanne Cooper) and hellcat [Jill] on The Young and the Restless, cartoon characters don't necessarily spring to mind — okay, maybe during the Brenda Dickson years." Jamey Giddens, also of Zap2it, described her portrayal as "cheesetastic". Head writer Josh Griffith stated that he "adores" Walton, saying that he's "always thought Jill was an integral character to the show". Of Jill's long-standing feud with Katherine, Global TV wrote: "Katherine vs. Jill The ongoing feud between Katherine Chancellor and Jill Foster Abbott sets a record as daytime's longest rivalry. For nearly 27 years, these two women have been constantly getting in the way of the each other's happiness. Whether it's over men, money, or the custody of a child, Katherine and Jill are always in direct competition."

In 2008, Tommy Garrett of Canyon News awarded Walton a "Daytime Gold Standard" for her portrayal. He stated: "Walton played each scene in this “Bette Davis-like” emotional marathon of a week. How did Walton do it? With aplomb and greatness." The following year, when Jill opened her own nail salon, Mike Jubinville, also of Zap2it, noted that the character had "stepped into a time warp". Prior to being paired with Colin, Nekeeta Borden wrote that, "Jill Foster Abbott (cough, cough) Fenmore's (Jess Walton) Jimmy Choos must have crossed paths with a black cat, because she can't find a good man to bless her somewhat shriveled heart." Of the character's possible pairing with Colin, she added: "I, for one, hope that Maria Arena Bell and Co. keep Colin in Genoa City and surprise us all by making him a dream lover for Jill. She is a multidimensional character with a lot of fire, and a great capacity to be soft and vulnerable. Goodness knows she's been through the ringer [sic]. Can Jill find love with Colin, or will her newest dalliance lead to heartbreak?" In 2013, Giddens wrote of Walton's portrayal throughout her run, stating: "Unlike most soap opera recasts, where success or failure depends on chemistry with an opposite sex romantic lead, newcomer Jess Walton would sink or swim, based on her ability to connect with fellow female powerhouse Jeanne Cooper, who played Jill's bitter rival Katherine "Kay" Chancellor." He also commended Walton and Cooper's portrayal of their characters' rivalry, "To say Walton swam alongside Cooper would be an understatement. The two women did a backstroke even Ryan Lochte and Michael Phelps would have to admire, during their 26 years as acting partners," he wrote.

Walton won a Daytime Emmy Award in 1997 for Lead Actress in a Drama Series for her portrayal of Jill, and was nominated in 1996, 2000, and 2017. She also won the Daytime Emmy for Outstanding Supporting Actress in 1991, after a nomination in 1990. Dickson won a Soap Opera Digest Award in 1988 for Outstanding Villainess for the role, and Walton won one for Outstanding Lead Actress in 1994.

Charlie Mason from Soaps She Knows placed the initial two recasts of Jill on his list of the worst soap opera recasts of all time, commenting that "Nowadays we think of Jess Walton and only Jess Walton as Billy's Mommie Dearest. But in the 1970s and '80s, Brenda Dickson owned the role of the man-eating manicurist. When she exited stage right in 1980, first Bond Gideon, then Deborah Adair (later Kate, Days of our Lives) tried to fill in…but fell so flat that Dickson was lured back three years later." In 2022, Mason also placed Jill 8th on his list of the best 25 characters from The Young and the Restless, commenting "How ironic — and perfect — that the onetime manicurist would become infamous for her talons! The mercurial mantrap (played first by Brenda Dickson and longest by Jess Walton) sank her insatiable claws into one unsuspecting fella after another, in the process earning herself a reputation — since mellowed — as Genoa City's resident queen of mean."
