= Janice Lynde =

American actress

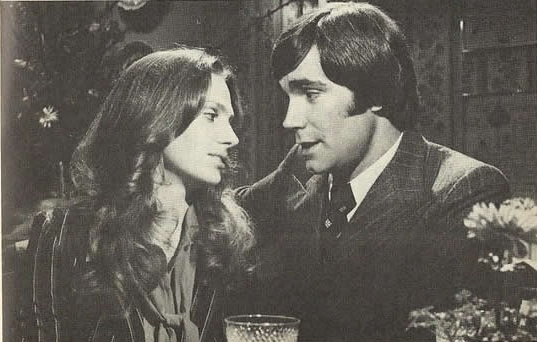
- Lynde and John McCook in a scene from The Young and the Restless
- Born: Janice Lynne Zoch; March 28, 1948 (age 78); Houston, Texas
- Education: Indiana University; University of Pennsylvania
- Occupation: Actress
- Years active: 1973–present
- Known for: TV soap opera roles

Janice Lynde (born Janice Lynne Zoch; March 28, 1948) is an American actress.

== Early years ==
The Houston-born, Lake Charles, Louisiana-reared The child of German parents Marvin and Sophia Zoch, she had to learn English in kindergarten. After graduating from Sulphur High School in 1964, she attended Indiana University (IU) and the University of Pennsylvania, studying music at both institutions. Lynde's performances at IU brought her to the attention of musician Fred Waring, which led to her being a soloist with Waring and his Pennsylvanians choir for two years. By July 1972 she was using Janice Lynde as her professional name.

In 1961, Lynde won the Miss Teenage Lake Charles title and went on to participate in the Miss Teenage America contest, where she was one of the finalists.

At IU Lynde made the Dean's List and pledged Delta Zeta sorority. She left there in the fall of 1965 to begin touring with Waring.

== Career ==
Lynde began her career with the Dallas Symphony, both as a pianist and as a vocal soloist. After she graduated from college, she began a career in acting in New York City, where her Broadway credits include Applause, The Me Nobody Knows, and Butterflies Are Free.

In 1973, she moved to Los Angeles, where she was among the original cast members of the CBS soap opera The Young and the Restless, playing "Leslie Brooks". She left the series in early 1977. Two years later, Lynde joined Another World as "Tracy DeWitt"; she left the role in 1981. In 1984, she starred as Laurel Chapin Wolek in One Life to Live, which she left in 1986.

She appeared in several film and television programs, including a notable role in the episode "A Hand for Sonny Blue" of Quinn Martin's Tales of the Unexpected (1977) as well as Match Game. Lynde also appeared on episodes of the game show Tattletales along with her then-partner, Young and the Restless co-star William Gray Espy.

== Filmography ==
=== Film ===
Year	Title	Role	Notes
1980	Beyond Evil	Alma Martin	
1991	Missing Pieces	Marion	
1994	In the Living Years	Erika Donahue	
1996	Subterfuge	Newscaster	
2002	The Marriage Undone	Alice	
2009	2 Dudes and a Dream	Mrs. Stevenson	
2009	A Letter to Dad	Erika Donahue	
2010	Father vs. Son	Ruth Coletti	

=== Television ===
Year	Title	Role	Notes
1973	Griff	Lynette	"The Framing of Billy the Kid"
1973	Mannix	Maria Vaughn	"Sing a Song of Murder"
1973–1977	The Young and the Restless	Leslie Brooks	Continuing role
1974	The Odd Couple	Phyllis	"Cleanliness Is Next to Impossible", "Vocal Girl Makes Good"
1974	Lucas Tanner	Vicki	"Thirteen Going on Twenty"
1974	The F.B.I. Story: The FBI Versus Alvin Karpis, Public Enemy Number One	Bernice Griffiths	TV film
1974	Barnaby Jones	Edna Triplett	"Odd Man Loses"
1975	Get Christie Love!	Eva	"I'm Your New Neighbor"
1975	Tattletales	Herself (panelist)	5 daytime episodes with The Young And The Restless co-star William Gray Espy
1976	Barnaby Jones	Samantha Yates / Alice Caldwell	"Silent Vendetta", "The Fatal Dive"
1976	Match Game	Herself (panelist)	5 daytime episodes, 1 in syndication
1976	Roxy Page	Roxy Hagopian	TV film
1977	Tales of the Unexpected	Brenda Jackson	"A Hand for Sonny Blue"
1978	Quincy, M.E.	Tracy Boulder	"Ashes to Ashes"
1978	Escapade	Paula Winters	TV film
1979	240-Robert	Mrs. Kline	"The Apology"
1980	Top of the Hill	Josie	TV film
1980	Nightside	Lilly	TV film
1979-1981	Another World	Tracy Matthews / Tracy DeWitt	Regular role
1981	Love, Sidney	Karen	"The Party"
1984–85	One Life to Live	Laurel Chapin	Regular role
1986	Family Ties	Monica	Episode 96: 'My Back Pages'
1986	Sledge Hammer!	Evelyn Collins	"Magnum Farce"
1987	9 to 5	Suzanne	"Judy's Dream"
1987	Night Court	Toni Corbin	"No Hard Feelings"
1987	Who's the Boss?	Joan	"Just Mona and Me"
1989	Baywatch	Mary Porter	"The Cretin of the Shallows"
1989	Dear John	Dr. Davenport	"The Dilemma with Emma"
1990	Sister Kate	Mrs. Ferguson	"Kandid Kate"
1990	ABC Afterschool Specials	Nina	"A Question About Sex"
1990	Adam-12	Annette Collier	"Escapees"
1990	General Hospital	Gloria	TV series
1992	Doing Time on Maple Drive	Judy	TV film
1997	Promised Land	Aunt Anne	"St. Russell"
1998	Beyond Belief: Fact or Fiction	Ms. Wiseman	"The Hooded Chair"
1998	Touched by an Angel	Phyllis	"An Angel on the Roof"
1999	Air America	Valentina	"Red Sub"
2000	One Kill	Evelyn Gray	TV film
2002	Another Pretty Face	Dr. Devaughn	TV film
2002	Great Performances	Zozo	"The Merry Widow"
2005	Six Feet Under	Loretta Smith Sibley	"Hold My Hand"
2009–2011	Diary of a Single Mom	Peggy	Main role
2010	Deal O'Neal	Mrs. Bittlemen	TV film
2018	The Young and the Restless	Leslie Brooks	Guest role
2021	The Young and the Restless	Leslie Brooks	Guest role
