= Beau Kazer =

Canadian actor

- Born: May 22, 1951; Toronto, Ontario, Canada
- Died: December 30, 2014 (aged 63); Thousand Oaks, California, U.S.
- Other name: Beau Kayser
- Occupation: Actor

Beau Kazer (May 22, 1951 – December 30, 2014) was a Canadian actor who worked primarily on television. He was best known for his recurring role as Brock Reynolds on the American soap opera The Young and the Restless.

Kazer studied drama at the Stella Adler Studio of Acting. After graduation, Kazer landed his first acting job in 1974 on the fledgling CBS daytime drama The Young and the Restless. His character, Brock Reynolds, was the adult son of Katherine Chancellor (Jeanne Cooper).

Kazer had appeared on Y&R semi-regularly since the character's introduction to the show. He played the role of Brock from 1974 to 1980, then again from 1984 to 1986. Brock returned to Genoa City in 1988 and stayed through 1992, then returned in 1999 before departing in 2003. He had appeared occasionally since then, including a brief return in November 2008 to deliver the eulogy at "Katherine's funeral." However, Brock's mother did not die (instead it was Katherine's look-alike, Marge). Kazer reprised the role temporarily in April 2009.

In the 1976 film Taxi Driver, Robert De Niro's character Travis Bickle is shown kicking over a television set that is playing a scene from an episode of Y&R featuring Kazer as Brock and Brenda Dickson as Jill. Both Kazer and Dickson are credited in the film as "Soap Opera Man" and "Soap Opera Woman", respectively.

Outside of Y&R, Kazer had roles on General Hospital (where he played Dr. Bunny Wilson), Hart to Hart, B. J. and the Bear and Barnaby Jones. He was married to photographer Sharon Alkus, and the two owned a ranch in central California. Kazer died on December 30, 2014, in Thousand Oaks, California at the age of 63.

== Partial filmography ==
- November Children (1972)
- Taxi Driver (1976) - Soap Opera Man
