= Greg Foster (The Young and the Restless) =

Fictional character from the American CBS soap opera The Young and the Restless

- The Young and the Restless character
- Portrayed by: James Houghton (1973–76, 2003); Brian Kerwin (1976–77); Wings Hauser (1977–81, 2010); Howard McGillin (1981–82)
- Duration: 1973–82, 2003, 2010
- First appearance: April 3, 1973
- Last appearance: June 21, 2010
- Created by: William J. Bell
In-universe information
- Occupation: Attorney in private practice in Chicago; Worked at Legal Aide as an attorney Opened a law office after graduation Graduate of Yale Law School
- Parents: William Foster; Elizabeth Foster
- Siblings: Snapper Foster; Jill Foster Abbott (adoptive)
- Wife: Nikki Newman (1979–81)
- Aunts and uncles: Bruce Henderson
- Nieces and nephews: Chuckie Roulland; Jennifer Foster; Phillip Chancellor III (adoptive); Billy Abbott (adoptive)
- First cousins: Mark Henderson; Lorie Brooks

Greg Foster is a fictional character from the CBS soap opera, The Young and the Restless. A string of actors played the role from 1973 to 1982, most notably James Houghton and Wings Hauser, who reprised the role in 2003 and 2010, respectively.

== Casting ==
The character of Greg Foster was brought to life by James Houghton in the series premier on March 26, 1973 and aired until April 21, 1976. Houghton later returned to The Young and the Restless as one of the soap's writers in 1991. The character was recast with Brian Kerwin, who aired from October 12, 1976, to March 30, 1977, when the character was written out for a few months. He was followed by Wings Hauser from December 10, 1977, to 1981 and Howard McGillin from 1981 to 1982. The character was then not seen again for 21 years - Greg's return on February 28, 2003. James Houghton only stayed until March 5, 2003. The character returned again seven years later in 2010, portrayed this time again by Wings Hauser, from June 17 to 21, 2010.

== Storylines ==
=== 1973–82 ===
Greg Foster is the second and youngest son of Bill Foster Sr. and Liz Foster. Greg has two siblings, Snapper Foster, who put Greg through law school after their father walked out on them, and Jill Foster Abbott, who was adopted at birth.

Greg finds himself attracted to his brother Snapper's love interest, Chris Brooks, who takes a job as Greg's secretary at his new law firm. When she learns that her father had financially helped the firm in return for her employment, Chris is furious and quits. Greg eventually overcomes his feelings for Chris when he falls in love with a woman named Gwen Sherman. He makes plans to marry her but changes his mind when he discovers she was a prostitute. Instead, he tries to help lead Gwen out of prostitution, but her pimp uses physical force to pressure her into continuing to accept clients. Greg finally persuades Gwen to press charges against her pimp and Gwen is freed of prostitution. Greg and Gwen's relationship ends when she experiences a spiritual awakening and becomes a nun.

Greg represents Snapper, who is charged with murder after their father, Bill, dies. However, the reality was that Bill's life-support machine had been disconnected by Liz, who later had a stroke and lost her memory. With Greg's help, Snapper is cleared of the murder charges.

Greg offers his legal services at Snapper's clinic while working with one of Snapper's employees, Dr. Casey Reed, with whom Greg pursues a brief relationship. Greg then meets and falls in love with Casey's sister, Nikki Reed. Greg and Nikki's involvement eventually develops into love, and they plan to marry. However, Nikki is still dealing with the emotional aftermath of killing her father, which led her to question her self-worth. Nikki's ex-boyfriend, Paul Williams, tries to stop her from marrying Greg, but Nikki insists she is in love. Greg and Nikki marry at the Brooks family home with their loved ones in attendance. But married life proves too dull for Nikki; she takes a modeling job at a place which turned out to be a front for prostitution. Nikki's client, Walter Addison, is killed. Greg is forced to take the case of a young man named Tony Baker who is accused of the murder, but evidence later points to Nikki. Greg decides to break up with her. Later, a hitman arrives in Genoa City with plans to kill Greg, but the hitman accidentally shoots Liz, who recovers. Nikki rushes to the hospital when she hears the news, but Greg chastised Nikki. They divorce in 1981.

Greg next falls for April Stevens, but he turns hostile when she reveals that Paul Williams is the father of her daughter, Heather Stevens. When Heather becomes gravely ill, Greg convinces Paul to marry April and be a real father to Heather. Two years later, Greg leaves town.

=== 2003, 2010 ===
Greg returns to Genoa City twenty-one years later with Liz, who is preparing to undergo brain surgery and admits to Jill that she was adopted. Seven years afterwards, Greg makes another visit to town when Liz is sick again. She later dies of natural causes.
