= Katherine Chancellor =

- The Young and the Restless character
- Jeanne Cooper as Katherine Chancellor
- Portrayed by: Jeanne Cooper (1974–2013); Beverly Garland (1981); Gisele MacKenzie (1986); Michael Learned (2011)
- Duration: 1973–2013
- First appearance: November 1973
- Last appearance: May 3, 2013
- Introduced by: William J. Bell
- Crossover appearances: The Bold and the Beautiful
In-universe information
- Other names: Katherine Shepherd; Katherine Sterling; Katherine Murphy
- Occupation: Author; Businesswoman; Philanthropist
- Family: Chancellor
- Father: Walter Shepherd
- Husband: Gary Reynolds (1950–60); Phillip Chancellor II (1961–75); Derek Thurston (1978–81); Rex Sterling (1988–90, 1992–94); Patrick Murphy (2009–13)
- Sons: Brock Reynolds; Tucker McCall
- Grandsons: Devon Hamilton
- Granddaughters: Mackenzie Browning
- Other relatives: D.J. Hellstrom (great-grandson); Becca Hellstrom (great-granddaughter); Dominic Abbott Newman Winters Chancellor (great-grandson); Ashley Abbott (godchild); Victoria Newman (godchild); Chloe Mitchell (godchild)

Katherine Chancellor is a fictional character from the CBS Daytime soap opera The Young and the Restless, portrayed by Jeanne Cooper for most of her time on the show. She was created and introduced by show creator William J. Bell in January 1974. Cooper's Katherine was introduced in an effort to increase the show's struggling ratings. When Bell's plan proved successful, Cooper was signed to a contract. Cooper went on to become one of the longest-running cast members in the show's history, ending her nearly 40-year run on May 3, 2013, five days before her death.

Throughout Katherine's history, a majority of her storylines were focused on her controversial and also chaotic relationship with Jill Abbott. The feud is one of the longest-running in the history of American soap operas. The rivalry was ignited by Jill's affair with Katherine's then-husband, Phillip Chancellor II, and how Katherine's attempt to win back his affections led to his death. Afterward, the women fight over Jill and Phillip's son, Phillip III, as well as numerous other men, including Katherine's husband, Rex Sterling. A 2003 plot twist led to Katherine and Jill believing they were mother and daughter; however, this plot was undone in 2009 by head writer Maria Arena Bell, and Katherine is given another son, Tucker McCall.

Cooper is regarded as an icon of the genre, with some critics believing her character and performance are chiefly responsible for the soap opera's success and longevity. She is also famed for having her own facelift performed onscreen in 1984, as Katherine gets the same procedure within the story. It is referred to as daytime television's first "extreme makeover".

== Casting ==
The character was introduced by Bell, after he was disappointed with the series' weak ratings, and hired Cooper as a quick fix to add controversy to the storylines. In 2010, Cooper said she was called in by producer John Conboy for the role, who thought she was "such a good actress" and "hoped she would be interested in daytime". The actress signed a three-year contract and expected to depart after its expiration, but became a crucial character. Beverly Garland substituted for Cooper in the role in January 1981 for a few days when she fell ill. Gisele MacKenzie briefly substituted for Cooper for six episodes in August 1986. Cooper also appeared as Katherine on The Bold and the Beautiful for two episodes on October 31 and November 1, 2005. In 2005, Cooper was awarded with the Daytime Emmy Award for Lifetime Achievement. In 2008, after several years of being nominated, Cooper received the Daytime Emmy for Outstanding Lead Actress. In 1989, Cooper won Soap Opera Digest's Editor's Award along with the award for Outstanding Lead Actress. In October 2011, it was announced that Cooper had taken a medical leave, and the role was temporarily recast with Michael Learned. Shortly after, it was announced Cooper had returned to work, reclaiming the role on December 23, 2011. Cooper's final appearance as Katherine aired on May 3, 2013, five days before her death.

== Development ==
=== Characterization ===
Katherine has been referred to as "The Dame of Genoa City" and "The Duchess". Cooper has said every time she goes to work, she "assumes somebody is watching for the first time." The actress has said a longtime fan became attached to the character "because with all her money, she still had the same problems they did–it's just nicer to go through it all with money!" Cooper has also said she felt it was "so smart" for the show to start Katherine off as a drunk, "because that has given her such a range of personality traits to express over the years." In 2012, she felt Katherine had been "pretty dumb" because she had been acting as a minister, also stating the character becoming a minister was "funny". Afterward, she told the producers, "Fun is fun, but Katherine is not a minister!"

=== Feud with Jill ===
Jill and Kay's infamous "cake catfight" in 2009.

Katherine is known for her rivalry with Jill Foster Abbott which has lasted for nearly four decades, becoming the longest rivalry on any American soap opera. Their storyline has included believing they were mother and daughter for years, though it was proven false. On the rivalry, BuddyTV wrote: "Nothing spells rivalry like the on-going feud between Jill Foster Abbott and Katherine Chancellor." Of working with Brenda Dickson who originated the role of Jill, Cooper said: "Brenda had as much fun with the Katherine/Jill relationship as Jess and I did. When there was the 'Who Killed Phillip?' storyline and our characters were in court, and being thrown about, a faction of fans lined up at CBS with posters marching, and this group flew in from the east coast. And they were pro- Brenda. Then, I in turn said to her, 'Well all these people must have gotten pregnant by someone else’s husband.' They had to get us out of the studio because we had death threats! They would say that I or she 'deserved to die.' Oh, the studio was very quiet about that, and they had police stand there. It was wild!" In 1993, Katherine was diagnosed with breast cancer and shared several tender scenes with Jill. Nancy Reichardt of the Los Angeles Times noted the characters were acting out of character; she wrote: "Katherine's breast cancer scare was touching and seeing Katherine and Jill come together added an intriguing new dimension to their relationship. To confuse us, the show has thrown out this budding friendship as if it never happened. How much more moving it would have been if these two women faced Katherine's request for Jill to name her child Phillip as former adversaries trying to put the past behind them instead of as bitter enemies of days gone by." Of working with Cooper, Walton has stated: "I thank God every day for that woman. She feeds me. She is like a shot in the arm when you see her in the morning. She is funny and sharp and I love her."

A writer from the Jamaica Gleaner noted fans have been getting restless with Jill's newfound closeness to Katherine, writing: "Katherine and Jill are at their best when they are at each other's throats." Cooper has said of the storyline where she returned to Jabot: "Since I went back into the business of business, I've been taking away some of Jill's power. You wanna go broke? Leave your company in the hands of Jill! The other day, we were filming some confrontational scenes, and Jess [Walton] says, 'Doesn't it feel good?' And the crew is like: 'Good! The girls are at it again!'" Lilana Novakovich of The Record noted that the rivalry between women has "outlived most marriages." Cooper stated: "The audience - both young and old - relate to the Kay/Jill relationship". Walton describes their relationship as "incredible" and said: "The love and the hate is so mixed, and there is never any telling when it will bubble out now. It used to be, “This month I like her... this month I hate her.” Now, it's more from moment to moment."

=== Death ===
Jeanne Cooper died on May 8, 2013. On May 28, the series dedicated an entire episode to Cooper in which those closest to her reminisced about their time with her. Executive producer Jill Farren Phelps also revealed that in addition to the memorial tribute for Cooper, the writers would also incorporate Katherine Chancellor's death into the series. Throughout most of the summer, Katherine being off screen is explained as being off on vacation with her husband, Murphy. Phelps denied rumors the show was planning to recast and revealed Kay's exit would be "as dramatic and meaningful as possible". Phelps said the ramifications of the character's death would be big, especially in regard to what would happen with the character's company, Chancellor Industries. However, Phelps could not comment on what would happen to the iconic Chancellor Mansion set. It was revealed that Katherine's last words were adlibbed by Cooper herself. Cooper's real life son, Corbin Bernsen, officiated Katherine's memorial as Father Todd. Cooper's co-star, Daniel Goddard, revealed on Facebook that filming for Katherine's memorial began on July 16, and was slated to air on September 3 and 4. Entertainment Weekly later revealed Katherine's death would be acknowledged on August 16, 2013. Despite Katherine's family and friends being blindsided as they initially come to welcome her home, a fight immediately ensues over her fortune.

== Storylines ==
=== Background ===
Katherine is the daughter of Army intelligence officer, Walter Shepherd, and his wife. She was born on October 25, 1928, in Genoa City. Katherine attends high school with several Genoa City residents including best friend, John Abbott, and his future wife, Dina. Katherine is even named godmother to their daughter, Ashley. After her graduation from Genoa City University, Katherine marries her high school and college classmate, Gary Reynolds. They have a son, Brock in 1952. When we first heard Katherine Chancellor refer to her son Brock Reynolds, his father Gary had died years earlier, and he was cavorting on his inheritance in Europe with Lorie Brooks, daughter of newspaper editor Stuart Brooks, while attending college. Brock was estranged from his mother, and it was implied that after his father's untimely death and her remarriage, he had gone rather wild with sex and drugs. Katherine's new husband Phillip Chancellor II was deeply rooted in the history of Genoa City, which was founded by Phillip's great-great-grandfather Civil War hero Garfield Dandridge Chancellor. Garfield Dandridge Chancellor's company built many of the early buildings in Genoa City, which are now considered historical landmarks, but the show begins with Phillip Chancellor II running Chancellor Industries.

=== 1973–1998 ===
When Katherine is first introduced, she and Phillip have been married for 12 years, but the marriage is crumbling due to Katherine's drinking. After discovering Phillip's affair with Jill (Brenda Dickson), she convinces Brock (Beau Kazer) to romance Jill. However, Phillip files for divorce when he learns Jill is pregnant with his child. In August 1975, after Phillip returns from obtaining a divorce, Kay tries to win him back and ends up driving their car off a cliff. Phillip dies after a deathbed wedding to Jill. To honor Phillip's memory, Katherine decides to get sober. In the late 1970s, Katherine falls for Derek Thurston (Joe Ladue), who tricks her into marriage, despite his love for Jill. However, in exchange for staying in the marriage, Katherine would set up a $100,000 trust fund for Jill's son, Phillip Chancellor III. When Derek's ex-wife, Suzanne Lynch, drugs Kay and sends her to the sanitarium, Kay is presumed dead in a fire. Derek and Jill marry only for Katherine to show up at the wedding to reclaim her fortune, and her husband. Katherine put her faith in Derek and put him in charge of Chancellor Industries; however, when the company begins to fail, she hires Victor Newman (Eric Braeden) to take Derek's place. Katherine later becomes godmother to Victor and Nikki Newman (Melody Thomas Scott)'s daughter, Victoria.

In an attempt to save her marriage, Katherine and Derek go on a cruise. However, after realizing her marriage is over, Katherine jumps over board and is taken hostage by her savior, Filipe Ramirez. They fall in love and she divorces Derek for Filipe. In 1984, Katherine went under the knife for a facelift with her close friend, Liz Foster (Julianna McCarthy), by her side despite her feud with Jill, Liz's daughter. Katherine later romances tennis pro, Brent Davis, the former lover of Dina Abbott. When Brent discovers he is dying and decides to tell Ashley he is her biological father, Dina and Katherine fail to talk him out of it. An angry Dina tries to kill Brent, but accidentally shoots Kay; however, she quickly recovers. When Katherine discovers Jill's affair her husband John's son, Jack (Terry Lester), she exposes them which leads to John having a stroke. In May 1986, when Jill is shot, Katherine is one of the suspects. Katherine and Jill then battle over Phillip III (Thom Bierdz). To cope, Phillip turns to drinking. With help from Katherine and Jill, he gets sober. After Phillip's supposed death in 1989, Katherine and Jill team up to take custody of Phillip Chancellor IV from Phillip III's widow, and get back Phillip's fortune. However, Nina wins that battle. Jill later hires conman, Brian Romalotti, aka Rex Sterling (Quinn Redeker) to romance Katherine and steal her fortune, but the plan backfires when the duo actually falls in love and marry.

Later, Rex's former cellmate, Clint Radison finds Marge Cotrooke (also played by Cooper), who is a dead ringer for Kay and switches her with the real Katherine. Turned off by his wife's behavior, Rex divorces "Katherine" for Jill. With Rex gone, Clint begins selling off Katherine's assets, starting with the company. However, Brock returns and rescues his mother and her maid, Esther Valentine (Kate Linder) exposing the scheme. However Katherine and Marge form a bond Katherine helps gets Marge released from prison, realizing she was innocent. Katherine and Rex eventually remarry when he fakes a heart attack. Katherine later becomes the godmother and namesake to Esther's daughter, Katherine Valentine aka Chloe Mitchell (Elizabeth Hendrickson). To help Esther impress her love interest Norman Peterson (Mark Haining), Katherine and Rex agree to pretend to be Esther's servants. With encouragement from Norman, Esther convinces Kay to put her in her will. However, Norman is unwilling to wait for Katherine's death, and breaks into the safe. Rex discovers him and Norman shoots and kills him in late 1994. Katherine forgives Esther and includes her in her will once again.

=== 1998–2005 ===
In July 1998, Jill discovers a letter from Phillip II leaving the Chancellor Mansion to her. Jill tries to evict Katherine who finds a legal loophole which results in Katherine and Jill being forced to share the house. Jill nearly drives Katherine to drink again; instead, Katherine runs off and contemplates suicide. Lost and broke, after being robbed, Katherine is taken in by a homeless girl, Mac (Ashley Bashioum). Katherine is shocked when Mac is revealed to be her granddaughter, Brock's daughter from an affair during his time in India. Kay brings Brock to town and reunites her family by moving them into the estate. When Brock leaves town, Katherine petitions for sole custody of Mac from her mother, Amanda Browning (Denice Duff). When Amanda reveals she has also run away from her husband, Ralph Hunnicutt (Angelo Tiffe, Daniel Quinn), Katherine convinces her to move into the mansion. Ralph shows up to cause trouble and the two eventually leave town together. In 2003, Katherine and Jill are mortified when they are mistakenly led to believe they are mother and daughter. The revelation forces Mackenzie to end her marriage to Jill's son, Billy Abbott (Ryan Brown) due to them being cousins. Jill and Katherine eventually form a bond, despite their feud still remaining as intense as ever. Katherine begins having nightmares about giving away a baby, believing she gave Phillip away at birth to a woman named Violet Montgomery, and gave Jill another child who was raised as Phillip Chancellor III. The baby turns out to be Cane Ashby (Daniel Goddard), who had recently "married" the scheming Amber Moore (Adrienne Frantz). However, Katherine forgives Amber and they eventually become close friends.

=== 2005–2013 ===
In 2005, Cooper appears as Katherine on The Bold and the Beautiful when she is approached by Massimo Marone (Joseph Mascolo) who introduces her to Stephanie Forrester (Susan Flannery), the daughter of Katherine's old business acquaintance, John Douglas. Katherine is revealed to be the true owner of Forrester Creations, thanks to a trust set up by Stephanie's father. Katherine helps Stephanie reclaim the company from her estranged husband, Eric Forrester (John McCook).

In 2008, Katherine has a minor stroke while secretly trying to help Marge - who has recently returned - get into rehab. In November of that year, Katherine and Marge get into a car accident on the way to the rehab center. Katherine is mistaken for Marge and pronounced dead at the scene. Kay is rescued by Marge's friend, Patrick Murphy (Michael Fairman), believing she is Marge. Katherine regains her memories and convinces Murphy to take her home. However, Jill is hesitant, believing Katherine is really Marge, a belief that is affirmed when Katherine fails several tests comparing her and Jill's DNA. Despite this, Katherine convinces her closest friends, including Victor and Nikki, to believe her identity. Meanwhile, Katherine and Murphy become engaged. When Katherine's DNA matches Brock's and doesn't match Jill's, it is confirmed that they are not related, leaving Jill devastated. Katherine and Murphy are married in May 2009.

In the summer of 2009, it is revealed Cane is not Jill's son, but a man hired by the real Phillip who faked his death because he was gay. Katherine becomes an ordained minister to marry Amber and Daniel Romalotti (Michael Graziadei). Katherine later decides to take Chancellor Industries public only for her to become the victim of a hostile takeover by Tucker McCall (Stephen Nichols), who is revealed to be her biological son; the child Jill was supposed to be. Despite a rocky relationship, Katherine rushes to Tucker's side when he ends up in a coma and is given control of his company, McCall Unlimited. Katherine is shocked to discover Tucker has been searching for his son, and decides to pick up the search. In the meantime, Katherine stops Tucker's attempt to buy up shares of Victor's company, Newman Enterprises, and even fires his executive, Sofia Winters (Julia Pace Mitchell), and Ashley from Jabot. Tucker recovers and takes back his company while Katherine learns Devon Hamilton (Bryton James), the adopted son of her close friend, Neil Winters (Kristoff St. John), is actually Tucker's son. After Tucker fires Devon from his record label, Katherine launches a label under 'Chancellor Industries and puts Devon in charge. When Tucker steals Jabot out from under Katherine, she has a stroke and the truth about Devon's paternity is revealed. Both father and son are furious with her, but she and Devon eventually begin to work through their differences. When Tucker goes along with another scam allowing everyone to believe Victor is dead, Katherine writes him out of her will and leaves his share to Devon.

When Jack takes control of Newman Enterprises and steals Neil away from Chancellor, Katherine comes out of retirement to run her company on her own. Katherine begins suffering from lapses of memory and Jill blames her new assistant, Adriana Stone (Jhoanna Flores). However, it is eventually revealed Katherine has a brain tumor, and Katherine makes Cane keep the secret while she undergoes surgery. The tumor is benign. Katherine steps down as CEO and names Cane as her successor much to Jill's dismay. Cooper's last appearance is Katherine wishing Jill goodnight after a welcome home party.

Katherine and Murphy then embark on a three-month-long vacation to several locations where they send postcards to her relatives instructing them to meet her at the mansion on August 16. Jill is shocked to realize the places on the list are on Katherine's bucket list. Murphy returns and tells everyone Katherine died in her sleep following a reunion with Tucker on August 1. Katherine leaves Jill a mysterious letter, while she encourages Nikki to track down the child she gave up as a teenager. After Katherine's funeral, she appears to Jill and Nikki smiling. Katherine instructs her family and friends to celebrate her life, instead of mourning her death. In the meantime, she leaves Devon the remainder of her estate, amounting in $2.45 billion.

== Reception ==
Katherine is considered a daytime television icon, described as "the matriarch of all soaps". Some critics have said that Cooper's performance as Katherine has contributed to the show's success and longevity. HuffPost TV ranked her at number four on "The 15 Most Memorable Female Soap Opera Characters Ever", with Michael Maloney writing:

We've watched Katherine Chancellor lose her husband to a younger woman, undergo a face-lift, battle alcoholism and return to her family after her doppelganger died in a car wreck. Cooper's Kay lends sympathetic support to loved ones like her best pal Nikki and her granddaughter Mac, but what we love to see Kay do more than anything is outwit her rival Jill, a feat she often excels at.

In 2022, Charlie Mason from Soaps She Knows named Katherine as the best character on his list of the best 25 characters from The Young and the Restless, commenting "Who on earth could possibly outrank the undisputed king of Genoa City? The late, great Jeanne Cooper's beloved Mommy Warbucks, that’s who. A rare gem, the so-called Duchess was a fabulously flawed individual who was fated to follow her heart… even when that foolish organ convinced her that it was a great idea to drive over a cliff with her estranged husband in tow!"
