= Lynne Topping =

American stage and television actress

- Topping in 1982
- Born: Lynne Edea Topping; July 10, 1949; Terre Haute, Indiana, U.S.
- Died: April 17, 2011 (aged 61)
- Occupations: Stage and television actress
- Spouse(s): Jeff Richter; James Francis Farrell
- Children: 2

Lynne Edea Topping (July 10, 1949 – April 17, 2011) was an American stage and television actress. She was best known for playing Chris Brooks Foster in the American soap opera television series The Young and the Restless.

== Life and career ==
Topping was born in Terre Haute, Indiana, the daughter of Malachi and Edea Topping. One of her parents was a physician. She had four brothers. She attended Wiley High School. She also attended the University of Miami. During her junior year at the university, she won the title of Miss Florida in a beauty pageant in 1969, She signed a contract with Universal Studios after she won the American College Theater Festival. She moved to California, and she began her screen career in 1970, appearing in her and only film The Naked Zoo, starring Rita Hayworth, Stephen Oliver, and Fay Spain. In 1977, she appeared in the television programs Quincy, M.E., Kojak and Aspen.

Topping in 1977

Later in her career, from 1979 to 1982, Topping played Chris Brooks Foster in the CBS soap opera television series The Young and the Restless, the daughter of newspaper owner Stuart Brooks (Robert Colbert). She guest-starred in television programs including The Incredible Hulk, What Really Happened to the Class of '65, Knight Rider, Hardcastle and McCormick, It's a Living and Hunter. During her screen career, in 1993, she appeared in the Florida stage play The Taming of the Shrew, and in 2007, she appeared in Michael Page's Off-Broadway play Hot Flashes at the Miracle Theatre in New York.

== Personal life and death ==
Topping was married twice. She was first married to Jeff Richter, but their marriage ended. She then married James Francis Farrell, whom she met in Florida in 1993. They had two daughters. Her second marriage lasted until her death in 2011.

Topping died on April 17, 2011, at the age of 61.
