= List of The Young and the Restless characters introduced in the 1970s =

A list of notable characters from the CBS soap opera The Young and the Restless that significantly impacted storylines and debuted between March 1973 and December 1979. All characters introduced during this time were created by series co-creator William J. Bell.

== Brad Elliot ==
Brad Elliot
- The Young and the Restless character
- Portrayed by: Tom Hallick
- Duration: 1973–78
- First appearance: March 26, 1973
- Last appearance: March 17, 1978
- Introduced by: William J. Bell
In-universe information
- Occupation: Former Reporter at The Genoa City Chronicle; Former Neurosurgeon and psychiatrist
- Spouse: Leslie Brooks (1975–77)
- Children: Unknown child

Brad Elliot first appeared on March 26, 1973, and was portrayed by Tom Hallick until 1978.

The very first episode of The Young and the Restless began with Brad Elliot being mugged, carjacked, and left for dead beside the highway. A semi-truck driver picked him up and dropped him off in Genoa City, Wisconsin. Stuart Brooks, owner of The Genoa City Chronicle watched Brad eat breakfast at Pierre's Restaurant, then admit that he was unable to pay the check, and offer to work it off. Stuart paid the check for him, they spoke for a while, and Stuart gave Brad a job at his newspaper and an advance on his wages, suggesting he rent a room above the restaurant. Brad did just that and became a friend and confidant to Sally McGuire, the waitress. Brad went to work at the newspaper and discovered and destroyed a newswire that declared that Chicago doctor, Brad Eliot, had died in a car crash, his body burned beyond recognition. Stuart's oldest daughter, Leslie Brooks, fell in love with Brad who encouraged her to come out of her shell and enjoy a very successful career as a concert pianist. Leslie's 21-year-old sister, Lorie, who had always been jealous of Leslie because Stuart had spent so much time nurturing Leslie's talent, returned home from college in Paris, where she had led a wild life of sex, alcohol, and drugs. Unable to spark any interest from Brad, Lorie started intercepting their letters and phone calls while Leslie was on tour. Lorie managed to convince Brad that Leslie was no longer interested, and convinced Leslie that she had seduced Brad. As the thought of Brad and Lorie having sex haunted Leslie, she had a nervous breakdown, freezing at the piano during a concert in New York City. After being led off stage by her mentor, Maestro Fautsch, Leslie wandered through Central Park, her purse was stolen, and she wound up institutionalized for weeks with no memory in a ward with a few other mentally disturbed women who taunted her mercilessly. Eventually her doctor discovered who she was from a publicity photo and notified Stuart, who flew to New York and rescued Leslie.

Stuart and his wife Jennifer secretly supported Leslie through her recovery in a sanitarium near Genoa City. Meanwhile, Lorie became engaged to Brad. After months of therapy Leslie was released. When Brad found out what Lorie had done, he broke up with Lorie, and he and Leslie got back together. With Brad's encouragement, Leslie bought Pierre's Restaurant and turned it into The Allegro, a nightclub where she could perform without having to travel. Stuart and Jennifer spent many evenings at Allegro, proud of their talented daughter who was also singing there. Lorie had dug up Brad's past, and she exposed it once she was no longer in his life. Brad had been a Chicago neurosurgeon/psychiatrist who had gone against hospital rules to operate on his own son who had died on the table. Brad had been so distressed that he had left Chicago, leaving his practice, his parents, and his girl friend Barbara Anderson behind. His wrecked and burned car had been found later with a body inside which had been burned beyond recognition, and he had been declared dead. Leslie ended up healing Brad by getting him to talk to Barbara and other neurosurgeons who convinced him that he had done all anyone could have for their son, and that their son's death was not Brad's fault. Leslie also arranged a reconciliation between Brad and his parents. Brad and Leslie then married. They honeymooned in Palm Springs where the Mid-America Symphony was performing. Brad had gotten tickets and arranged a meeting with Maestro Fautsch, who talked Leslie into resuming her career as a concert pianist.

While performing in Paris, Leslie ran into old friend Lance Prentiss, wealthy eligible bachelor and co-owner of Prentiss Industries, who lived in an estate not far from Genoa City on Lake Geneva. Leslie would often spot Lance in the audience as she toured the world performing, and he would meet her afterward for dinner. Lance finally revealed to Leslie that he was in love with her. But although their marriage was occasionally rocky, Leslie demurred, saying that her heart belonged to Brad. The kind and forgiving Leslie set Lance up with her younger sister, Lorie. After being lavishly romanced by Lance with intimate dinners all around the country and the world, Lorie gave in to his charms. Lance and Lorie were married on the spur of the moment during a trip to Lake Tahoe. Later that year Brad discovered that he had chronic neuritis and was going blind. Rather than let Leslie give up her career for him, he kept it a secret and made Leslie fall out of love with him, then asked her for a divorce. But when Brad discovered that Leslie was pregnant, he told her the truth, learned to read Braille, and they agreed that Leslie would never give up her career for him. After Brad accidentally hit Leslie in the stomach with a suitcase which caused her to miscarry, Brad filed for divorce and left town. Brock Reynolds helped Leslie get over Brad and proposed with a ruby ring, but she gently told Brock that she wasn't ready. Brad later returned, his eyesight restored by a risky operation, but Leslie rejected him, and he again left town.

== Stuart Brooks ==
Stuart Brooks
- The Young and the Restless character
- Portrayed by: Robert Colbert
- Duration: 1973–83
- First appearance: March 26, 1973
- Last appearance: May 30, 1983
- Introduced by: William J. Bell
In-universe information
- Occupation: Owner and Publisher of The Genoa City Chronicle
- Spouse: Jennifer Brooks (1947–77); Jill Foster (1978); Liz Foster (1980–84)
- Sons: Eric Vanderway
- Daughters: Leslie Brooks; Chris Brooks; Peggy Brooks
- Stepdaughters: Lorie Brooks
- Grandchildren: Theo Vanderway; Brooks Prentiss; Jennifer Foster

An original core character first appearing on March 26, 1973, Stuart Brooks was portrayed by Robert Colbert and is known for his marriages to Jill Foster and her mother, Liz. He made his last appearance in 1983, and was said to have died off-screen in 1984.

Stuart ran the city newspaper, the Genoa City Chronicle, and was married to Jennifer Brooks, with whom he had four daughters. The eldest, Leslie, an accomplished pianist, was very introverted and dateless due to music having consumed her entire life. The second, college student Lorie, was studying in Paris, where she led a life of sex, alcohol, and drugs with Brock Reynolds, son of Stuart's old friend, Katherine Chancellor. Third daughter, Chris, was a caring, thoughtful, and idealistic college student also working at the Chronicle with her father. Red-headed Peggy, the youngest, was still in high school. During the very first episode, Stuart helped drifter Brad Elliot, with whom Leslie ended up falling in love, get a job at the newspaper. Upon learning that Snapper Foster was secretly having an affair with waitress Sally McGuire while publicly in a relationship with Chris, Stuart tried to break up them up however, Chris refused to believe her father and moved out. Stuart was also busy helping Leslie through a mental breakdown thanks to Lorie's affair with Brad.

Later, Bruce Henderson, a former lover of Jennifer, came back to town following a divorce hoping to reunite with her. Jennifer hoped to leave Stuart but, his heart attack delayed her decision with them reconciling fully after Jennifer was diagnosed with breast cancer. Upon Jennifer's passing, Stuart began getting close to Snapper Foster's mother, Liz. She, however, resisted by claiming she was out of his class, leaving Stuart to be seduced by her daughter, Jill. Tricking Stuart into believing he had gotten her pregnant, he and Jill married. However, when the truth of Jill's fake pregnancy came to light, he promptly divorced her and turned back to Liz.

Lorie later released a book, 'In My Sister's Shadow,' all about her relationship with Leslie, causing Leslie another breakdown. Stuart berated Lorie for its release. Around the same time, Liz and Stuart finally got married and Peggy began working with Chronicle reporter Steven Williams to help expose the New World Commune, which had trapped Paul Williams and Nikki Reed. Steven and Peggy were eventually engaged but, due to her being in an affair with Jack Abbott, she left him at the altar.

During a happy marriage to Liz, Stuart was briefly entranced by his new secretary, Eve Howard, but her obsession with Victor Newman took precedence for her, with nothing ever happening between her and Stuart. Stuart and Liz's happiness was not to last, however, as, by late fall, Snapper's ex-lover, Sally Roulland, returned wanting Snapper to perform a much needed operation on their illegitimate son, Chuckie. For the first time in years, Snapper and Chris faced interference from Stuart, causing Liz to leave. After another failed attempt at romance, this time with Gina Roma, Stuart slowly faded from view after Jill tried and failed to help him and Liz reconcile. As editor of the Genoa City Chronicle, Stuart was involved in an attempt to prove that police officer Carl Williams had been framed by the mob. While his four daughters returned for Victor and Nikki's wedding in 1984 and mentioned Stuart still being in town, he was later said to have died.

== Chris Brooks Foster ==
Chris Brooks Foster
- The Young and the Restless character
- Portrayed by: Trish Stewart (1973–1978, 1984); Lynne Topping (1978–1982)
- Duration: 1973–1982; 1984
- First appearance: March 26, 1973
- Last appearance: April 13, 1984
- Introduced by: William J. Bell
In-universe information
- Occupation: Former Jabot Cosmetics Model; Former social worker Former secretary Formerly worked at The Genoa City Chronicle
- Parents: Jennifer Brooks; Stuart Brooks
- Siblings: Leslie Brooks; Lorie Brooks; Peggy Brooks; Eric Vanderway
- Spouse: Snapper Foster (1974–)
- Children: Jennifer Elizabeth Foster
- Stepsons: Chuckie Roulland
- Nieces and nephews: Brooks Prentiss; Theo Vanderway

Christine "Chris" Brooks Foster first appeared in March 1973 as one of the daughters of newspaper owner Stuart and Jennifer Brooks. Chris is best remembered for her romance and marriage to Dr. Snapper Foster. She was portrayed by actress Trish Stewart until March 17, 1978, and then Lynne Topping from September 15, 1978, to August 20, 1980, and from March 2, 1981, to September 14, 1982, before Stewart briefly appeared again in April 1984.

History
Nineteen-year-old college student Chris Brooks began working at her father's newspaper, The Genoa City Chronicle. She quickly began a romance with Snapper Foster, the son of Liz Foster. Snapper's family was relatively poor in comparison to the Brooks family as Liz Foster was forced to work on the assembly line at Chancellor Industries while Snapper held a part-time job and was attending medical school all to support his family that also includes Greg and Jill Foster. Snapper was against a relationship with Chris because of how busy he was and did not want to upset Chris. Yet, Chris was determined and left home when Stuart tried to prove that Snapper was having an affair. Chris began working alongside Greg Foster as a secretary, yet Greg fell for her. When Chris learned that her father paid her salary, she quit, which also hurt Greg. Afterwards, Chris was raped by George Curtis while job hunting. The memory ended up hurting her romance with Snapper as memories haunted her. Snapper ended up convincing Chris to press charges, which she eventually did, but he was set free. Snapper even ended his affair to Sally McGuire and proposed to Chris, who accepted. However, Sally was pregnant and hoped to convince Snapper to marry her. But Liz talked Sally out of it with Snapper overhearing.

Chris and Snapper ended up marrying and she quickly got pregnant. But she miscarried when she learned about Snapper's child with Sally, and they briefly separated as Chris began working as a social worker with Greg again. Chris was assigned to help Ron and Nancy Becker, and their young daughter Karen. Chris' sister, Peggy, was raped, and Peggy identified her attacker as Ron. Chris urged Peggy to file charges, Ron was arrested, but in a trial was found not guilty. When Nancy discovered evidence that proved Ron was actually guilty, she became catatonic, and was committed to a mental hospital. Since Chris was having trouble getting pregnant, and she wanted to save Karen from living with her rapist father, she and Snapper convinced Ron to give them custody of Karen. But after Nancy recovered, Karen was returned to Nancy's custody. Chris was so devastated that she separated from Snapper again and left town. Months later, Chris returned to find that Snapper was involved with Dr. Casey Reed. Chris forced Snapper to choose between them, and Casey ended up bowing out to save Snapper's marriage. By 1977, Chris's mother Jennifer died and Stuart began seeing Snapper's mother Liz and they eventually married after Stuart ended his marriage to Jill Foster.

By 1981, Chris gave birth to Jennifer Elizabeth Brooks, and soon after, Snapper's former lover, Sally McGuire, re-entered Snapper's life with their son, Chuckie, who was seriously ill. While Chuckie was hospitalized with a kidney problem, Sally realized that she was still attracted to Snapper, but Snapper was adamant that she move on with her life. When Chuckie was cured, Snapper shared an emotional goodbye with both Sally and Chuckie as they returned home with Sally's fiancée, Stan. Snapper ended up accepting a fellowship teaching and research opportunity in London. But Chris, who was now a model at Jabot Cosmetics, was opposed to moving there. Eventually, Chris moved there with Jennifer, later joined by her mother-in-law and stepmother, Liz. During their stay in London, Chris's father Stuart ended up dying. In 1984, Chris briefly returned to Genoa City along with her sisters Peggy, Leslie, and Lorie to attend the wedding of business tycoon Victor Newman and Nikki Reed, the younger sister of Casey Reed.

== Leslie Brooks ==
Leslie Brooks
- The Young and the Restless character
- Portrayed by: Janice Lynde (1973–77, 2018, 2021); Victoria Mallory (1977–84)
- Duration: 1973–82; 1984; 2018; 2021
- First appearance: March 26, 1973
- Last appearance: October 15, 2021
- Created by: William J. Bell
- Introduced by: Bell and John Conboy (1973); Bell and H. Wesley Kenney (1984); Mal Young (2018)
In-universe information
- Other names: Pricilla
- Occupation: Professional concert pianist Owner of The Allegro Nightclub
- Parents: Jennifer Brooks; Stuart Brooks
- Sisters: Lorie Brooks; Chris Brooks; Peggy Brooks
- Half-brothers: Eric Vanderway
- Spouse: Brad Elliot (1975–77); Lucas Prentiss (1978–81)
- Children: Brooks Prentiss
- Nieces and nephews: Jennifer Foster; Theo Vanderway

Leslie Brooks (formerly Elliot and Prentiss) first appeared March 26, 1973, as one of the daughters of newspaper owner Stuart and Jennifer Brooks. Leslie is best remembered for the love triangle between her, Brad Elliot, and her sister Lorie Brooks, as well as her relationships with Lucas and Lance Prentiss. She was portrayed by actress Janice Lynde until January 7, 1977, and then by Victoria Mallory from January 13, 1977, through December 9, 1982, and again briefly in 1984. In February 2018, it was reported that Lynde would be returning as Leslie to commemorate with the show's 45th anniversary.

History
Leslie was in her mid-twenties when her father, Stuart, befriended a penniless drifter named Brad Elliot and gave him a job at The Genoa City Chronicle, of which Stuart was the owner and publisher. Leslie fell in love with Brad who encouraged her to come out of her shell and enjoy a very successful career as a concert pianist. Leslie's 21-year-old sister, Lorie, had always been jealous of Leslie. Unable to spark any interest from Brad, Lorie started intercepting their letters and phone calls while Leslie was on tour. Lorie managed to convince Brad that Leslie was no longer interested, and convinced Leslie that she had seduced Brad. As the thought of Brad and Lorie having sex haunted Leslie, she had a nervous breakdown, freezing at the piano during a concert in New York City. After being led off stage by her mentor, Maestro Fautsch, Leslie wandered through Central Park, her purse was stolen, and she wound up institutionalized for weeks with no memory in a ward with a few other mentally disturbed women who taunted her mercilessly. Eventually her doctor discovered who she was from a publicity photo and notified Stuart, who flew to New York and rescued Leslie. While away, Lorie became engaged to Brad, but when he found out what Lorie had done, he broke up with Lorie, and he and Leslie got back together. Lorie quit her job at the Chronicle and published her first book, which Stuart editorialized as "a disgusting piece of trash". With Brad's encouragement, Leslie bought Pierre's Restaurant and turned it into The Allegro, a nightclub where she could perform without having to travel.

Lorie had dug up Brad's past, and she exposed it once she was no longer in his life. Brad had been a Chicago neurosurgeon/psychiatrist who had gone against hospital rules to operate on his own son who had died on the table. Brad had been so distressed that he had left Chicago, leaving his practice, his parents, and his girlfriend Barbara Anderson behind. His wrecked and burned car had been found later with a body inside which had been burned beyond recognition, and he had been declared dead. Leslie ended up healing Brad by getting him to talk to Barbara and other neurosurgeons who convinced him that he had done all anyone could have for their son, and that their son's death was not Brad's fault. Leslie also arranged a reconciliation between Brad and his parents. Brad and Leslie then married. They honeymooned in Palm Springs where the Mid-America Symphony was performing. Brad had gotten tickets and arranged a meeting with Maestro Fautsch, who talked Leslie into resuming her career as a concert pianist. While performing in Paris, Leslie ran into an old friend Lance Prentiss, a wealthy eligible bachelor and co-owner of Prentiss Industries. Lance would follow Leslie across the world as she performed and he eventually confessed his love for her. Despite his intentions, Leslie claimed her love was for Brad, and helped to set Lance up to her sister Lorie. Soon after, Brad discovered that he had chronic neuritis and was going blind. Rather than let Leslie give up her career for him, he kept it a secret and made Leslie fall out of love with him, then asked her for a divorce. But when Brad discovered that Leslie was pregnant, he told her the truth, learned to read Braille, and they agreed that Leslie would never give up her career for him. After Brad accidentally hit Leslie in the stomach with a suitcase which caused her to miscarry, Brad filed for divorce and left town. Brock Reynolds helped Leslie get over Brad and proposed, but Leslie claimed she wasn't ready yet. Brad later returned, with his eyesight restored by a risky operation, but Leslie rejected him, and he again left town by 1978.

Then, Lance's mother Vanessa Prentiss informed Leslie that she much preferred her to be with Lance rather than Lorie, but Leslie defended her by suggesting that Lorie didn't release her book In My Sister's Shadow about their relationship. Yet, Lorie ended up releasing the book, which caused her to have another nervous breakdown when reporters confronted her about it. When Lance learned about its release, he was disgusted with Lorie and ran to comfort Leslie. Although Leslie convinced Lance to return to Lorie, Leslie ended up pregnant with Lance's child. When confiding to Lance's brother Lucas, who had also fallen for Leslie, he eventually proposed, and they were married. Leslie and Lucas also agreed not to tell Lance the truth about the son, Brooks Lucas Prentiss. Vanessa, hoping to destroy Lorie and Lance's marriage, made Lucas president of Prentiss Industries. Lance tried to tempt Lucas away with a position in Paris, but he refused. Lance visited Leslie on tour, and Lucas caught them. Fearing he was going to lose Leslie, Lucas rescinded his offer of the Paris position, which Lance had eventually accepted, and instead offered him a position in their dangerous Santo Domingo office. Leslie and Lucas' marriage was strained by then, though, and they were divorced by 1981. Lance invited Leslie to live with him and Lorie, but after Lorie learned that Brooks was actually Lance's son, Leslie suffered another mental breakdown. She left town, and while wandering around with amnesia, ended up having a romance with Jonas, the owner of a local bar, as she claimed her name was Priscilla. Lucas and Jonas ended up meeting when both went off to fight the dictator of San Leandro. Lucas discovered "Priscilla" as a stowaway on the jet, but Leslie didn't recognize him, and it was obvious that she was in love with Jonas. After their successful adventure, they all returned to Genoa City. "Priscilla" met Lorie, but did not recognize her either. Lorie and Lucas told Leslie who she was and who they were, but Leslie became confused and overwhelmed. Lorie worried that Leslie would soon regain her memory and demand custody of Brooks. But Leslie explained that she couldn't be a proper mother to a child she did not remember, and she gave full custody of Brooks to Lorie.

Leslie ended up rediscovering her talents as a pianist and decided to stay in Genoa City as Jonas also agreed to stay. After falling and hitting her head, Leslie regained her memory and recalled her love for Lance and that he was the father of her son. Leslie filed for custody of Brooks, but lost him to Lorie because she was the only mother he had ever known. Vanessa suggested Leslie tell Lance that he was the father of Brooks, so she, Lance and Brooks could be together. But in the end, when Lance discovered that Brooks was his son, he rejected both Lorie and Leslie for keeping it from him. And when Brooks refused to have anything to do with Lance, he returned to Paris alone. Leslie then became involved with Attorney Robert Laurence, and they made plans to marry. But when Robert's ex-wife Claire, who was institutionalized, was given a drug that finally worked that brought her back to reality, Robert returned to her to try to rebuild their family with their daughter Angela. Leslie went back to touring in Europe, and was seen again when she and her sisters returned to Genoa City to attend the wedding of Victor Newman and Nikki Reed in 1984. Leslie briefly returned for the soap's March 27, 2018 episode.

== Liz Foster ==
Liz Foster Brooks
- The Young and the Restless character
- Portrayed by: Julianna McCarthy
- Duration: 1973–1986; 1993; 2003–04; 2008; 2010
- First appearance: March 27, 1973
- Last appearance: June 18, 2010
- Introduced by: William J. Bell
In-universe information
- Occupation: Former Housekeeper and maid to Katherine Chancellor; Former Factory worker at Chancellor Industries
- Brothers: Bruce Henderson
- Spouse: Bill Foster (194?–75, 1976); Stuart Brooks (1980–84)
- Sons: Snapper Foster; Greg Foster
- Adoptive daughters: Jill Foster Abbott
- Grandsons: Chuckie Roulland; Phillip Chancellor III; Billy Abbott
- Granddaughters: Jennifer Foster
- Nephews: Mark Henderson
- Nieces: Lorie Brooks

Elizabeth "Liz" Foster Brooks is an original character to The Young and the Restless; she was known for her marriages to William Foster and Stuart Brooks and was one of the show's two original matriarchs. She was portrayed by actress Julianna McCarthy on and off for 37 years until her death onscreen on June 18, 2010. Until her initial departure on April 8, 1985, McCarthy was the show's longest running cast member although she hadn't been on contract since September 1984.

Elizabeth Foster was an assembly line laborer at Chancellor Industries, and the mother to William "Snapper" Foster and Greg Foster. She is also the adoptive mother of Jill Foster Abbott although this wasn't made known to viewers until several decades into the series. Liz dated a man named Sam Powers until her long-departed husband, Bill Foster, returned. She was married to Bill, and then he walked out on her and their children in the late 1960s, only to return in 1975 with ailing health, unbeknownst to the Fosters. During the first year of the show, Liz's family history was explored. Her brother, Bruce Henderson, appeared briefly as Jennifer Brooks' former lover who turned out to be Laurie Brook's biological father. Liz blamed Bruce for neglecting their aging mother, Mrs. Henderson (Dorothy Adams) who lived on the family farm, struggling for years only with help from Liz who was having a difficult enough time supporting herself and her children. Bruce had chosen to leave the Genoa City area years before to pursue a medical career, only returning when Jennifer and her husband Stuart were separated. While Laurie Brooks liked Liz, she never acknowledged that Bruce was her father, blaming her mother for stealing her birthright and her man, having fallen in love with Bruce's son, Mark.

Snapper had sex with a woman named Sally McGuire, and later started dating another woman named Chris Brooks. Sally found out that she was pregnant, while Snapper and Chris were going to get married. Sally was also married to Pierre Roulland. She and Snapper kept the baby's paternity hidden; in reality, Snapper was the baby's father, and not Pierre. Sally gave birth to a son, Pierre Charles "Chuckie" Roulland, and everyone was led to believe that Pierre was his father. Thus, Liz's first grandson was born.

In 1976, Liz suffered a stroke and lost her memory temporarily after she pulled Bill's life support. Snapper took the fall for Liz, who had no memory of what happened. Eventually, Liz regained her memory of the incident. Liz began dating and later married Stuart Brooks, who also had an affair with Jill. Jill faked a pregnancy in order for Stuart to marry her; in reality, she was not pregnant and was only after his money. Stuart planned to marry Jill, although he loved Liz, until Jill fell down a flight of stairs and "miscarried." Stuart found out that he had been conned, and he and Liz soon married. During that time, she became an employee and close friend of Katherine Chancellor, despite Jill's ongoing feud with her. In 1979, Liz was shot when her politically ambitious son, Greg, became involved with a ruthless men attempting to influence Greg's campaign. She recovered and settled into her new marriage to Stuart, becoming a beloved step-mother to his four daughters, one of whom was her own daughter-in-law, Chris.

When Stuart and Liz attended a London concert of his daughter, Leslie's, Katherine stepped in to help when the simple Liz felt out of place amongst London's elite. Earlier, Stuart's glamorous secretary, Eve Howard, Jill's new roommate, had helped Liz throw a lavish cocktail party in his honor. In 1982, Liz left Stuart after his attitude towards Snapper got harsher upon the return of Sally Roulland and Chuckie, her son by Snapper. The same year, most of the Brooks and Foster families were written out with Snapper moving to London. Liz was off-screen for a short time but was back to aid Jill in her quest to win back old boyfriend, John Abbott, whom Liz liked very much. Stuart faded out of the story in 1983 after using his newspaper to help clear police detective Carl Williams of being a crooked cop. He died off screen in 1984 after efforts from Liz's friends and even Jill failed to reconcile them.

When Jill married John Abbott, Liz attended the wedding and befriended Jill's step-daughter, Tracy. Liz was also there for Katherine when she had her face lift. Liz helped Katherine mourn for Nikki (Liz's former daughter-in-law) when they falsely believed that Nikki had been killed while on vacation with psychotic Rick Darros but, Nikki was very much alive, and Liz was a guest at Nikki and Victor Newman's wedding where Stuart Brook's former secretary, Eve, tried to kill the bride. Detective Carl Williams became suspicious when Jill reported her jewelry stolen and a pawnbroker identified Liz as the seller. It turned out that Jill was being blackmailed for a fling she had with Jack Abbott and asked Liz to pawn the jewelry for her. After this, Liz decided to move to England to be near Snapper. She visited Genoa City in 1986 along with Jill's son, Phillip Chancellor III, upon learning about Jill's shooting. Liz visited town again in 1993 when Jill gave birth to Billy Abbott after Katherine discovered that Jill hadn't even notified her mother about being pregnant. During that time, Liz loses her temper with Katherine after she insults her daughter, telling Katherine that the hatred caused by their feuding turned Jill into the woman that she is now.

In 2003, Liz came back to Genoa City and informed Jill that she needed emergency surgery for a brain tumor. She revealed to Jill that she was adopted. Liz only knew that her first husband, William, brought her home in a baby blanket one day. However, Liz had recently received information that a woman named Charlotte Ramsey had proof that her biological mother was actually Katherine. Liz's surgery was successful and she remained in town for her recovery, returning to London the following year. However, in 2009, it was revealed that Katherine was not Jill's mother after all. Liz came back in 2008 when Katharine was believed to have died in a car accident.

Liz returned in June, 2010, in ill health with sons, Snapper and Greg, and some news for Jill about her birth parents. On June 18, 2010, Liz died onscreen due to a condition that had gone too far without being treated. Liz told Snapper on her deathbed about Jill's true parentage, and she made him promise not to tell Jill, but he told her anyway.

In 2024, Charlie Mason from Soaps She Knows included Liz in his list of the best mothers in American soap operas, writing, "The single mom worked a crap job for years to support her kids. She always had advice at the ready, whether or not it was wanted. And with regard to daughter Jill[…] Well, points for trying, Liz".

== Phillip Chancellor II ==
Phillip Chancellor II
- The Young and the Restless character
- Portrayed by: John Considine (1974); Donnelly Rhodes (1974–75)
- Duration: 1974–75
- First appearance: January 28, 1974
- Last appearance: June 20, 1975
- Introduced by: William J. Bell
In-universe information
- Occupation: Founder and former CEO of Chancellor Industries
- Family: Chancellor
- Parents: Phillip Chancellor I
- Spouse: Katherine Chancellor (1961–75); Jill Foster (1975)
- Sons: Phillip Chancellor III
- Grandchildren: Chance Chancellor
- Grandparents: Garfield Dandridge Chancellor

Phillip Robert Chancellor II first appeared January 28, 1974, only 10 days after Katherine Chancellor (Jeanne Cooper). He was first portrayed by John Considine until February 14, 1974, and was then notably portrayed by Donnelly Rhodes from March 4, 1974, until his death onscreen on June 20, 1975. Rhodes portrayed him again in newly recorded voice, and for the last time, on an episode that aired on July 21, 1998, while character Jill was at his graveside celebrating his birthday, imagining what life would have been like if he had lived.

History
“The history of the Chancellor family is deeply rooted in the history of Genoa City, which was founded by Civil War hero Garfield Dandridge Chancellor. In 1973, Garfield’s great-great-grandson, Phillip Chancellor II, was running Chancellor Industries. He resided in the Chancellor mansion with his alcoholic and promiscuous wife Katherine (Kay)". Phillip is born on June 19, 1928. He attends college with Gary Reynolds and the two become friends. In November 1973, wealthy Phillip first appeared in the series as the husband of Katherine Chancellor, Gary's widow, his wife of twelve years. Phillip and Kay's marriage was strained due to Kay's bad habits of infidelity, smoking and alcohol addiction. He tried to help Kay with her vices, but he wound up starting an affair of his own with Kay's new paid companion, Jill Foster, and the two fell in love. After declaring their love for one another, Phillip made plans to end his marriage to Kay and to marry Jill. Later, Phillip and Jill conceived a child together, and he officially left Kay to be with Jill. Phillip served an upset Kay with divorce papers, and then he left for the Dominican Republic where he got the divorce granted before returning to Genoa City.

Katherine picked him up from the airport and gave him a ride home, and she begged him for a second chance. Phillip refused, and an angry Kay sped up and drove off a cliff in an attempt to kill them both. Phillip survived the crash long enough to marry Jill on his deathbed. Phillip was buried on the Chancellor estate property in the backyard. Jill later gave birth to his son and his only child, Phillip Chancellor III.

== Lorie Brooks ==
Lorie Brooks
- The Young and the Restless character
- Portrayed by: Jaime Lyn Bauer (1973–2018); Wesley Ann Pfenning (1980)
- Duration: 1973–82; 1984; 2002; 2018
- First appearance: December 20, 1973
- Last appearance: March 27, 2018
- Created by: William J. Bell
- Introduced by: Bell and John Conboy (1973); Bell and H. Wesley Kenney (1984); Bell and David Shaughnessy (2002); Mal Young (2018)
In-universe information
- Occupation: Novelist; Author of In My Sister's Shadow; Author of first trashy novel (unknown title); Formerly "enquiring reporter" for The Genoa City Chronicle; Formerly went to school in Paris, France
- Parents: Bruce Henderson; Jennifer Brooks
- Stepfather: Stuart Brooks
- Half-brothers: Mark Henderson
- Half-sisters: Leslie Brooks; Chris Brooks; Peggy Brooks
- Spouse: Lance Prentiss (1977–80, 1984–96); Maxwell Hollister (1997–2002)
- Adoptive sons: Brooks Prentiss
- Aunts: Liz Foster
- Nephews: Brooks Prentiss
- First cousins: Jill Abbott (adoptive); Snapper Foster; Greg Foster

Lauralee "Lorie" Brooks first appeared on December 20, 1973, as the daughter of Stuart Brooks. She was portrayed by actress Jaime Lyn Bauer until August 6, 1982, with reappearances in 1984 and 2002. In February 2018, it was reported that Bauer would be returning as Lorie to commemorate with the show's 45th anniversary.

=== Storylines ===
Lorie arrives in Genoa City from Europe in December 1973. Lorie is jealous of her older sister, concert pianist, Leslie Brooks, whom she felt got all the attention from her parents. Determined to make her life miserable, Lorie found out that Leslie had a budding romance with new man in town Brad Elliot and schemed to get him for herself. When the plan worked, Leslie had a nervous breakdown and ended up in hospital. She eventually accused Lorie of causing her breakdown. Brad then dumped Lorie and married Leslie. After losing Brad, Lorie dated her publicist Jed Andrews. When she discovered he was married she pushed him away and helped him reconcile with his wife. Lorie then began a romance with medical intern Mark Henderson, the romance was serious and they became engaged. Mark was the son of Bruce Henderson. Little did anyone know that Lorie was the result of an affair Bruce and Lorie's mother Jennifer had years before. When Jennifer admitted the truth Lorie and Mark split and Mark left town. At the same time Lorie decided to write a thinly disguised autobiography about her life about being in her sister Leslie's shadow, which included details about Leslie's breakdown. She eventually shelved the book when she and Leslie became close. After Leslie became friends with a very wealthy fan of hers, Lance Prentiss, who ran his mother's company, Prentiss Industries, she pushed Lorie to date him. Although the pair traded barbs they also fell in love, though Lorie knew she was second choice. She also had to contend with Lance's mother Vanessa, a recluse, scarred in a house fire while saving Lance, his guilt making him indebted to her. Lorie managed to hold her own and ended up marrying Lance.

However, the news of their marriage made Vanessa furious, and she tried to shoot Lorie but hit Lance instead. Later, Lorie found Lance's brother Lucas and returned him to Genoa City. Vanessa was grateful to Lorie and the pair began to get along, until Lorie accused Vanessa of faking her injuries to hold onto Lance. Furious with Lorie, Vanessa found a copy of Lorie's unpublished book and paid someone to publish and distribute it. The book caused a scandal and Leslie refused to perform in public again. Lance rushed to comfort Leslie and they had sex, and Leslie became pregnant with his child. When Lucas found out he married Leslie and the pair moved to Europe so as not to raise suspicion. When Leslie returned to Genoa City for family reasons, Vanessa took the opportunity to make sure Lorie saw her sister naked in the shower, Lorie soon realized Leslie was too far along to be pregnant by Lucas and she confronted her sister who admitted the truth. Leslie rushed back to Europe with Lucas and had her son, Brooks Prentiss. Shortly after, Leslie's marriage to Lucas fell apart and she moved in with Lance and Lorie. Lorie was extremely unhappy with her sister living in her home and after a confrontation Leslie tried to kill herself. The stress caused another breakdown and she went missing. Meanwhile, Vanessa stripped Lance of all duties at Prentiss Industries and put Lucas in charge in the hopes of once again destroying Lance and Lorie's marriage.

Lance fell into a depression and began gambling. Lorie begged Vanessa to reinstate Lance, Vanessa agreed, on the condition that Lorie divorce Lance. At the same time Lucas decided he wasn't meant for the boardroom and handed back responsibility of Prentiss to Lance. Vanessa managed to keep this a secret from Lorie and made her think Lance's return to the company was because of her. She pushed Lorie to divorce Lance and flew her to Haiti for a quickie divorce. Lance assumed now that he had his life back on track, he and Lorie would reconcile, and was stunned when he discovered Lorie went through with the divorce. Heartbroken, Lance fled to Paris. Making only a brief return a few months later to visit Lucas in the hospital after he was shot. Meanwhile, Lucas had found Leslie who had amnesia and eventually brought her back to Genoa City. That same year Victor Newman took an interest in Lorie and the pair began a mild flirtation but it ended in friendship. The following year Lance returned to Genoa City, around the same time Leslie regained her memory and fought Lorie for custody of Brooks, though Lorie won. Meanwhile, Victor began buying shares of Prentiss Industries. He just needed Lorie's to secure control, but Lorie and Lance reconciled and she refused to sell. Meanwhile, Vanessa discovered she was dying and determined to rid Lorie from Lance's life for good, Vanessa jumped off the balcony of Lorie's penthouse and framed her for murder. Lucas believed Lorie guilty, while Lance thought her innocent and even proposed, though soon after seeing all the evidence against her, Lance walked out on her. Lorie took solace in the arms of her lawyer Robert Laurence, while Victor, disgusted by Lance's actions, vowed to take control of Prentiss. Lance began to realise Lorie was innocent and worked to help her, though it was revealed during the trial that Lance is Brooks father, Lance once again turned his back on Lorie, until Brooks reveals information about Vanessa that led to proving Lorie innocent. Meanwhile, Victor managed to gain control of Prentiss through Lorie. Lance realising he can never be a father to his son and unable to truly forgive Lorie, left town. Regretting her decision to give Victor control of Prentiss, Lorie began a romance with Victor and under the guise of writing a novel about him gained access to business files which allowed her to return control of Prentiss to Lance. Though she was to marry Victor, she left town and a heartbroken Victor behind.

Lorie, remarried to Lance, returned to town on invitation from Victor for his wedding to Nikki Reed in 1984. The pair mended old wounds, and Lorie reunited with her sisters for the big event, leaving again shortly after. She returned again in 2002, this time determined to keep Nikki and Victor from remarrying. Her soon to be ex-husband, Max Hollister, had business dealings with Victor and an interest in getting revenge and stealing Nikki away. He convinced Lorie to seduce Victor and have cameras watching so he could show the whole thing to Nikki. The plan backfired when Lorie felt compassion for Victor and refused to go through with the plan. She left town again soon afterward.

=== Reception ===
In 2022, Charlie Mason from Soaps She Knows placed Lorie 13th on his list of the best 25 characters from The Young and the Restless, commenting that "Jaime Lyn Bauer put the "super" in "supervixen," crafting a calculating character from whom you couldn't look away... and at whom you all too often wanted to direct a backhand. She was, to put it mildly, something."

== Brock Reynolds ==
Brock Reynolds
- The Young and the Restless character
- Portrayed by: Beau Kazer
- Duration: 1974–80; 1984–86; 1990–92; 1999–2004; 2008–11; 2013
- First appearance: October 18, 1974
- Last appearance: September 4, 2013
- Introduced by: William J. Bell
In-universe information
- Occupation: Ordained minister; Chairman of the Chancellor Foundation; Volunteer building houses for Hurricane Katrina victims in New Orleans, Louisiana; Lawyer; Singer
- Parents: Gary Reynolds; Katherine Chancellor
- Half-brothers: Tucker McCall
- Spouse: Jill Foster (1975)
- Daughters: Mackenzie Browning
- Grandsons: Dylan Hellstrom
- Granddaughters: Becca Hellstrom
- Grandfathers: Walter Shepherd
- Nephews: Devon Hamilton

Brock Reynolds first appeared on October 18, 1974, as the son of Katherine Chancellor and her first husband, Gary Reynolds, portrayed by Beau Kazer. He left the show on September 13, 1980. He would make guest appearances later, starting in April 1984, then from July 16, 1985, to August 7, 1986, and from April 6, 1990, to October 9, 1992. Kazer then made recurring appearances from 1999 to 2003, and then in 2004, 2008, 2009, 2010, 2011, and 2013.

Brock Reynolds is the son of Katherine Chancellor and her first husband Gary Reynolds. After his father's death and the failings of Katherine's new marriage with Phillip Chancellor II, Brock became quite rebellious with women and drugs. Eventually, Brock ran off to Europe with his friend Lorie Brooks, the daughter of newspaper mogul Stuart Brooks. Once Brock returned to Genoa City in 1974, he tried to make peace with his mother as he had found religion in his life and become a minister. Katherine, however, had become an alcoholic and heavy smoker, and was now losing her husband to her paid companion Jill Foster. Kay talked Brock into marrying Jill, but Jill quickly learned she was pregnant with Phillip's child. Brock allowed Jill to back out given that their marriage wasn't even legal. Later, Katherine and Phillip got into a car accident after he refused to give her another chance. Kay then decided to buy Jill's baby, but Brock talked Kay out of it. Over the next several years, Brock developed relationships with Casey Reed and Leslie Brooks, whom he even proposed to, but she claimed that she was not ready following her divorce from Brad Elliot. Brock had also earned a law degree and was able to represent Snapper Foster, and helped Snapper and his wife Chris Brooks Foster in a custody dispute.

By 1980, Katherine brought Victor Newman to Genoa City to help with running Chancellor Industries, bringing his young wife Julia Newman along. Julia, longing for something to do, ended up building a close friendship with Brock, and things nearly turned romantic. However, Brock and Julia never had a sexual relationship, despite Victor's fears that it was. Out of jealousy, Victor had an affair with his secretary, Eve Howard. Julia admitted she was falling in love with Brock, but they were not lovers, and she agreed to break if off if Victor would commit completely to their marriage. But Victor was not persuaded and turned to Brock's old friend Lorie Brooks for attention. Brock caught Victor and Lorie kissing, so he tried to resume his romance with Julia, but he finally left town because of Julia's inability to end her marriage to Victor. Thinking it would convince Victor of her love for him, Julia told him that she wanted to have a baby. Victor responded by having a vasectomy without telling her. In the end, Julia ending up having an affair and Victor's extreme response caused their divorce in 1981.

By 1984, Victor married Nikki Reed and Brock was invited to return. Brock had returned just before then helping Kay recover from her face-lift. Brock ended up staying around to cool the tensions as Kay and Jill's rivalry reached another breaking point with Kay's attempt to destroy Jill's marriage to John Abbott. By 1988, Kay married Rex Sterling, a bum who had spent some time in prison that Jill hired and cleaned up to trick Kay. His former cellmate Clint Radison finds Marge Cotrooke, a diner waitress and realizes that she looks the same as Katherine. He decides to use her in his plan to replace Kay with Marge and get to her fortune. His friends get jobs at the Chancellor Mansion, while Marge is taught to act like Kay. Kay Chancellor and her housekeeper Esther Valentine are held captive while Marge replaces Kay. Marge immediately changes things from Katherine's life, starting from unintentionally pushing Rex away into the arms of Jill Abbott, to selling Chancellor Industries. When Brock returns from India, he realizes that someone has replaced Kay. Marge later helps Kay catch Clint and his friends and get them in jail, before returning to her life as a waitress.

On the verge of losing her life in 1999, Kay befriended a teenager at a homeless shelter named Mackenzie Browning, who coincidentally ended up being Brock's daughter with Amanda Browning, a woman that Brock had a relationship with in India years ago. Kay decided to inform Brock of the baby he never knew he had. Brock and Mackenzie built a father-daughter relationship and lived with Kay. Brock eventually left town again to work in India, but reappeared in town from time to time. He was involved in the intervention that Kay's close friends held to make her stop drinking. He eventually relocated to New Orleans to assist in cleanup following Hurricane Katrina.

In 2008, Brock returned to Genoa City to deliver the eulogy at Kay's "funeral". When Kay's will was read, Brock learned that he got one percent of a billion-dollar estate to continue his charity work and was named chairman of the Chancellor Foundation. However, it was Marge, Kay's look-alike who had died so Brock returned again in April 2009 to take a DNA test to confirm his mother's identity. He comes back to Genoa City to take another DNA test with Tucker claiming to be Katherine's son and asked Mac if she was willing to carry Lily and Cane's twins and if she would help raise them if Lily did not make it. Brock continues to make periodical visits to Genoa City.

On August 1, 2013, Katherine Chancellor died in Hong Kong after a three-month-long vacation around the world as she completed her "bucket list". On September 3, Brock returned to Genoa City for his mother's memorial service.

== Phillip Chancellor III ==
Phillip Chancellor III
- The Young and the Restless character
- Portrayed by: Dick Billingsley (1978–1981); Chris Hebert (1981–1982); Jimmy Keegan (1983); Thom Bierdz (1986–2011)
- Duration: 1976–1983; 1986–1989; 2004; 2009–2011
- First appearance: January 1976
- Last appearance: May 30, 2011
- Introduced by: William J. Bell (1976); Maria Arena Bell (2009; 2011)
In-universe information
- Other names: Phillip Robert Chancellor III; Phillip Foster; Langley Ashby
- Occupation: Bar owner/bartender in Australia; Former GCU college student Worked at Chancellor Industries
- Family: Chancellor
- Father: Phillip Chancellor II
- Mother: Jill Abbott
- Stepfather: Stuart Brooks (1978); Derek Thurston (1978); John Abbott (1982–1985, 1993–1996); Rex Sterling (1990); Colin Atkinson (2011, 2014–2019)
- Half-brothers: Billy Abbott
- Spouse: Nina Webster (1989)
- Sons: Chance Chancellor
- Grandsons: Dominic Abbott Newman Winters Chancellor
- Grandparents: Phillip Chancellor I Neil Fenmore; Bill Foster (adoptive); Liz Foster (adoptive)
- Uncles: Snapper Foster (adoptive); Greg Foster (adoptive)
- Aunts: Lauren Fenmore
- Nieces and nephews: Johnny Abbott; Delia Abbott; Katie Newman
- First cousins: Chuckie Roulland (adoptive); Jennifer Foster (adoptive); Scotty Grainger; Dylan Fenmore (legal); Fenmore Baldwin

Phillip Chancellor III first appeared in January 1976, born onscreen as the son of Phillip Chancellor II and Jill Foster. The role was most notably portrayed by Thom Bierdz, who made his first appearance on May 13, 1986. He remained for three years until the character was believed to have died. In 2009, Bierdz was rehired by the soap opera, who kept secrecy around a plot twist that would reveal Phillip to be alive by sneaking Bierdz in to tape scenes and asked that he not tell anyone of his return. Bierdz remained on a recurring status through May 2011.

History
Phillip III is the son of Jill Foster and the late Phillip Chancellor II. He was born onscreen in December 1975 and appeared as a toddler by 1978. In 1982, Jill began seeing John Abbott and introduced Phillip to John, making both John and Phillip uncomfortable around each other. Later that year, Phillip acted out, forcing Jill to send him to boarding school. In the following year at Christmas time, on behalf of her mother, Liz Foster, Jill called Phillip at boarding school; he told her he did not want to spend the holidays with her.

In 1986, the character is SORASed to age 16, and he returns to town after Jill is shot. After Jill recovered, Phillip stayed in town but was resentful about the lack of time Jill spent with him while he grew up. Eventually, Katherine and Jill fought over Phillip as he moved into the Chancellor Estate and Katherine even tried to adopt him. Phillip even changed his name from Phillip Foster to Phillip Chancellor. Yet, Phillip began drinking heavily and became the center of a love triangle between friends Christine Blair and Nina Webster. After seducing him while he was drunk, Nina became pregnant with Phillip's son and gives birth to Phillip "Chance" Chancellor IV in late March 1988. Phillip marries Nina in April 1989 despite struggling with being a father, husband, and living up to Jill and Katherine's expectations which leads to him becoming dependent on alcohol. After a drunken car accident, Phillip "dies" on May 26, 1989, from his injuries.

In 2009, Phillip III returned, revealing he staged his death because of all the stress in his life and to keep his homosexuality secret. During his absence, Phillip sent his friend, Cane Ashby, to Genoa City as a replacement son of sorts for his mother and to fill the void he left behind for his family. When their ruse was discovered, Phillip attempted to form a relationship with his son, Chance, but decided to return to Australia shortly after. In September 2010, Phillip's son, Chance, was accidentally shot "dead" by his maternal half-brother, Ronan Malloy. Chance was pronounced dead at the scene. On September 17, 2010, it was revealed that Chance faked his death. Only Nina, Phillip, Ronan, Katherine and Christine must know that he was still "alive", as he was going into the Witness Protection Program. Phillip then left to go back home to Australia after Chance left to go into the Witness Protection Program. In May 2012, Jill temporarily moved to Australia to help Phillip recover after knee surgery.

== Vanessa Prentiss ==
Vanessa Prentiss
- The Young and the Restless character
- Portrayed by: K.T. Stevens
- Duration: 1976–81
- First appearance: May 28, 1976
- Last appearance: December 12, 1981
- Introduced by: William J. Bell
In-universe information
- Occupation: Former Co-Owner of Prentiss Industries with Lance
- Spouse: Albert Prentiss (1944–47)
- Children: Lance Prentiss; Lucas Prentiss
- Grandchildren: Brooks Prentiss

Vanessa Prentiss first appeared on May 28, 1976, and was portrayed by K.T. Stevens. She would later become widely known for being an archenemy of Lorie Brooks. In 1981, Stevens departed from the role when the character committed suicide to frame Lorie for her murder.

Vanessa was the mother of Lance and Lucas Prentiss. During the first year she was introduced, the lower part of her face was concealed with a veil because of a scar she received in about 1972 while rescuing Lance from a fire, which was accidentally caused by Lucas, who ran off after feeling guilty over the accident. Embarrassed by her condition, Vanessa never ventured into public. Vanessa was strongly against Lance's relationship with Lorie Brooks, whom she immediately took a disliking to upon their first meeting as she wanted Lance to pursue Lorie's sister Leslie, who met Lance first when on vacation in Paris. Vanessa then began her long tenure of conspiring to get Lorie out of Lance's life in order to get Lance and Leslie together. Pressured by Lorie to have cosmetic surgery, a resentful Vanessa unveiled her scars to Lorie. Vanessa later bought a revolver and planned to get even with Lorie after getting her to take off her veil revealing her scar. Unaware that Vanessa was out to get her, Lorie convinced Vanessa to consult a plastic surgeon. After the death of Lorie's mother Jennifer, she started feeling closer to Vanessa and set out to find Vanessa's son, Lucas. After Lorie found Lucas and brought him to Genoa City, Vanessa was astonished to her son for the first time in years and vetoed his plan to leave town. Vanessa was grateful to Lorie for bringing Lucas back into her life. Persuaded by Lucas, Vanessa underwent successful surgery for her scars. Vanessa was later shocked to learn that Lucas had married Leslie. After it was learned that Vanessa's disfiguring scars were a thing of the past, she went out in public for the first time without the veil.

After feeling miffed that Lance always seemed to side with Lorie, Vanessa plotted to shift their family company, Prentiss Industries, into Lucas' control, unbeknownst to Lance, and she later followed through with her plan. Lance was disappointed when Vanessa oust him as the company boss while Vanessa told Lorie she would not put Lance back in charge unless Lorie divorced him, which put a series of pressures on Lorie after Lance began spinning out of control. Lorie finally gave into Vanessa's demands by straining her marriage to Lance, which led to Lance leaving town.

In 1981, Vanessa learned she had two months to live after being diagnosed with a terminal illness and she kept quiet about it. After learning she had a short time to live, Vanessa, who had kept mum for over two years about Lance being the father of Leslie's baby, wrote in a journal that Lance has a son. When Lance returned to town with his fiancée, he later ended his engagement and resumed his romance with Lorie. Vanessa then plotted to shove Lorie down a stairway, but changed her plan and made Lance back down from Lorie after lying that Lorie was still involved with Lucas. Vanessa applauded when Lance turned to Leslie. As Vanessa's illness deteriorated, she still plotted against Lorie and then forged a venomous letter to herself signing Lorie's name to it. Vanessa later plunged to her death off a balcony after staging a fight with Lorie.

In 2024, Charlie Mason from Soaps She Knows included Vanessa in his list of the worst mothers in American soap operas, writing, "Helicopter parents had nothin' and Lance and Lucas' mom, whose threats were rarely as veiled as her scarred face and who wound up plunging to her death in hopes of erasing from her boys' life Lorie, aka the strumpet no mother wanted in the room, much less in-law."

== Derek Thurston ==
Derek Thurston
- The Young and the Restless character
- Portrayed by: Caleb Stoddard (1976); Jeff Cooper (1976); Joe Ladue (1977–84)
- Duration: 1976–81, 1984
- First appearance: July 23, 1976
- Last appearance: April 13, 1984
- Introduced by: William J. Bell
In-universe information
- Other names: George Bowen (birth name)
- Occupation: CEO of Chancellor Industries; Hair dresser
- Spouse: Suzanne Lynch (1960–70); Katherine Chancellor (1977–81); Jill Foster (1978)
- Children: Jamie Thurston

Derek Thurston first appeared in July and August 1976 and was first portrayed by both Caleb Stoddard and Jeff Cooper, who had brief stints on the series before Joe Ladue took over the role on April 28, 1977. The character was then married to Katherine Chancellor and romanced Jill Foster. Ladue departed from the role on March 3, 1981, but returned for a special guest appearance on April 13, 1984.

History
Derek was a hairdresser tricked into marrying Katherine Chancellor by Kay herself after Kay had fallen in love with him. Derek was actually attracted to Kay's sworn enemy, Jill Foster Abbott, but he decided to go along with Katherine because he knew he would gain wealth if he lived with her for a year and could then set up his own salon. However, Derek's past in organized crime came back to haunt him when the mob tried to shoot him, but accidentally shot Katherine, who was left paralyzed. Even after she recovered, Kay used her health as a way to hold onto Derek. Derek's life took another strange turn when his ex-wife, Suzanne Lynch, came to town prepared to do anything to win Derek back. By lacing candy with drugs, she attempted to drive Kay to insanity but it backfired when it appeared Kay had been killed by the candy and Derek, free of both his wives, inherited the Chancellor fortune and planned to marry Jill. Everyone was shocked when thought-to-be-dead Katherine showed up at the wedding to reclaim her fortune—and Derek, as well. The newly reunited couple decided to go on a cruise, but while traveling they had a fight that resulted in Kay jumping overboard. When she returned from being held captive by and falling in love with a man named Felipe, she divorced Derek. Derek had a friendly reunion with both Jill, who informed him she had gotten married, and Kay, who had just recently had a face-lift, when he appeared at the wedding of Victor Newman and Nikki Reed in 1984.

== Casey Reed ==
Casey Reed
- The Young and the Restless character
- Portrayed by: Roberta Leighton
- Duration: 1978–81; 1984–89; 1998
- First appearance: March 20, 1978
- Last appearance: June 30, 1998
- Introduced by: William J. Bell
In-universe information
- Occupation: Medical doctor
- Parents: Nicholas Reed; Barbara Reed
- Siblings: Nikki Reed
- Nieces and nephews: Dylan McAvoy; Victoria Newman; John Abbott III; Nicholas Newman

Dr. Cassandra "Casey" Reed first appeared on March 20, 1978, and was portrayed by Roberta Leighton. The character is better known as the older sister of longtime Genoa City resident Nikki Newman. Originally a main character with the actress on contract, she left June 8, 1981. Leighton returned for her sister, Nikki's wedding in April 1984 and then on recurring status from October 23, 1985, to August 12, 1989. Her most recent appearance was in April 1998.

History
Dr. Casey Reed is Nikki Reed's older sister. Casey takes a job at Snapper Foster's medical clinic in 1978. Snapper falls in love with Casey after he separates from his wife, Chris Brooks Foster. Casey and Snapper's relationship is troubled from the start because Casey suffers from a fear of sex and she is also worried about her younger sister, Nikki, who is a promiscuous teenager. When Nikki and Casey's mother is killed in a car crash, their father, Nick Reed, returns to Genoa City. Seeing her father again, Casey remembers a traumatic incident that has been buried deep in her subconscious. When she was a child, Nick raped her. When Casey, accompanied by her friend, Brock Reynolds, goes to confront Nick, he is in the process of trying to rape Nikki. During Nikki's struggle to defend herself, she accidentally kills their father.

Casey later begins seeing Lucas Prentiss, who has separated from his wife, Leslie Brooks. As Lucas turns his sights on Casey, who is making great strides in recovering from her troubled childhood, Casey is also trying to emotionally detach herself from Snapper, whose wife, Chris, has returned to Genoa City. When Chris realizes Snapper was involved with Casey, she introduces herself to the new woman in her husband's life. Since Snapper cannot decide which woman he wants to see exclusively, Chris and Casey jointly decide to cut off contact with him until he is able to make a decision. Casey ends her association with Lucas after realizing he still has feelings for Leslie. In 1981, Casey is harassed by a secret stalker, who eventually shifts his focus to Nikki. Meanwhile, Casey leaves Genoa City when she accepts a job in another town. In 1984, Casey briefly returns to Genoa City to attend her sister's wedding to Victor Newman. Casey returns to Genoa City in 1985 and leaves town again in 1989. In 1998, Casey makes another visit to Genoa City upon learning about the shooting of Nikki who has been shot by a psychotic woman named Veronica Landers who was posing as a maid named Sarah Lindsay. It was revealed in 2010 that Casey had been diagnosed with breast cancer, but was able to fight it.

== Rose DeVille ==
Rose DeVille
- The Young and the Restless character
- Portrayed by: Darlene Conley
- Duration: 1979–80; 1986–87
- First appearance: June 6, 1979
- Last appearance: January 21, 1987
- Introduced by: William J. Bell
In-universe information
- Occupation: Black market baby racketeer Leader of a prostitution ring
- Nieces: Primrose DeVille

Rose DeVille first appeared in 1979 as the owner and runner of a prostitution ring and, later, a black market baby organization. She was portrayed by Darlene Conley until 1980, with a return appearance from 1986 to January 1987.

History
Rose DeVille had a modeling agency that was really a front for drugs and prostitution. An unwitting, young Nikki Reed signed on and became entangled in the death of a businessman, Walter Addison. Rose later ran a home for unwed mothers while actually operating a black-market baby ring. She took a teenage Nina Webster under her wing, only to later abandon her on the delivery table and kidnap her son. Nina was led to believe the baby was stillborn. Eventually learning the truth, however, it was too late: Rose was gone and never seen again. The ordeal haunted Nina on and off over the years, the show occasionally featuring flashbacks, which featured Rose. The last of these happened in 2000 and 2010. In 2010, Nina and her friends, Paul Williams and Christine Blair all reminisced about the sad day. As Paul investigated Nina's lost-son whereabouts, he mentioned that Rose was deceased.

== April Stevens ==
April Stevens
- The Young and the Restless character
- Portrayed by: Patricia Albrecht (1979); Janet Wood (1980); Cindy Eilbacher (1980–94); Rebecca Staab (2008)
- Duration: 1979–82; 1992–94; 2008
- First appearance: December 4, 1979
- Last appearance: January 14, 2008
- Introduced by: William J. Bell (1979); Josh Griffith and Maria Arena Bell (2008)
In-universe information
- Parents: Dorothy Stevens; Wayne Stevens
- Siblings: Barbara Ann Harding
- Husband: Paul Williams (1981); Robert Lynch (1991–92)
- Daughters: Heather Stevens

April Stevens first appeared December 4, 1979, originally portrayed by Patricia Albrecht until December 24, 1979, before Janet Wood took over from January 21, 1980, to February 7, 1980. The role was finally assumed by Cindy Eilbacher, on February 21, 1980. She remained in the role until March 9, 1982. Eilbacher reprised her role from 1992 to 1994. April was last portrayed by Rebecca Staab for two episodes in January 2008.

History
In 1979, April became neighbors with Snapper and Chris Foster as she moved right next door to them in their apartment building. April Stevens then began to see and have an affair with Paul Williams and she became pregnant. Paul urged April to have an abortion and, when she refused, Paul turned his back on her. Paul ended up leaving Genoa City to join the New World Commune with his ex-girlfriend, Nikki Reed Foster. Steven Williams and Peggy Brooks were able to expose the commune as a cult. Nikki's husband Greg Foster ended up falling for April. When Greg learned April was gravely ill, he pressured Paul to finally marry April for their child, Heather. A reluctant Paul eventually married her in January 1981. Their marriage, however, turned dull and parental responsibility proved too much for Paul; he and April divorced. April's parents, Dorothy and Wayne Stevens, were introduced in 1980 as having struggled to make ends meet to take care of April, having been forced to give up another baby for adoption. An heiress by the name of Barbara Hartling discovered on her father's death bed that she was adopted and that Dorothy and Wayne were her parents. Barbara came to Genoa City and lavished them with money and gifts, eventually convincing them to move to New York City with her. After saying goodbye to Paul, April took Heather and left town.

Later, April married Dr. Robert Lynch, who physically abused April. On a visit to Genoa City back in 1992, Paul and his friend and future wife, Christine Blair, ended up figuring out the truth about April's marriage. April ended up leaving Heather behind out of protection but, back in New York, April stabbed Robert in self-defense. April was charged with murder while Christine and John Silva offered to represent her. Once the case was dropped, Paul hoped to have a new life with April and Heather, but April wanted to leave Genoa City again. April briefly returned to Genoa City in 2008 and revealed to Heather that Paul was her father, allowing them to begin to rebuild their father-daughter relationship. Heather left Genoa City in November 2011 and went to New York.

== See also ==
- The Young and the Restless characters (1980s)
- The Young and the Restless characters (1990s)
- The Young and the Restless characters (2000s)
- The Young and the Restless characters (2010s)
