= Jim Houghton =

American actor (1948–2024)

James Houghton
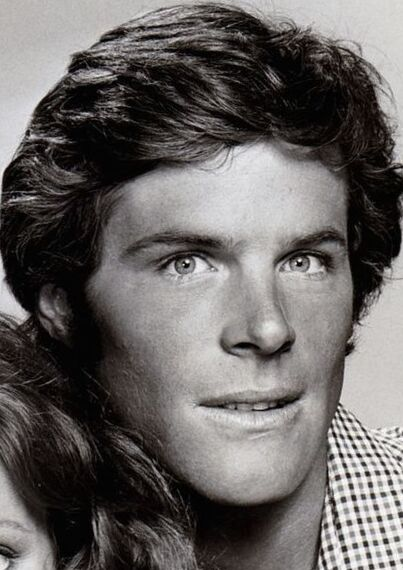
- Houghton in Knots Landing (1979)
- Born: November 7, 1948; Los Angeles, California, U.S.
- Died: August 27, 2024 (aged 75); Los Angeles, California, U.S.
- Occupations: Actor; script writer
- Years active: 1959–2006

James Carter Houghton (November 7, 1948 – August 27, 2024) was an American actor and soap opera writer. He was best known as an original cast member of CBS prime time soap opera Knots Landing in the role of Kenny Ward during seasons one through four (1979–1983).

== Life and career ==
Houghton was born in Los Angeles, California on November 7, 1948. He was the son of producer Buck Houghton. He began his acting career with appearances in the television shows Man with a Camera, The Twilight Zone, and McKeever & the Colonel. He was an original cast member of CBS daytime soap opera The Young and the Restless where he played Greg Foster from 1973 to 1976. After leaving daytime, Houghton was cast in a leading role in the short-lived CBS action series Code R in 1977.

His most prominent role is that of Kenny Ward, Kim Lankford's character's husband, on the long-running CBS prime time soap opera Knots Landing from 1979 to 1983. During the 1980s, he also guest-starred on Fantasy Island, Hotel, The Love Boat, and Remington Steele. In 1986, he had a small role in the ABC miniseries North and South, Book II and went on to play Cash Cassidy on the ABC prime time soap opera The Colbys from 1986 to 1987.

Houghton appeared in a number of films, including, Sweet Sugar (1972), One on One (1977), I Wanna Hold Your Hand (1978), More American Graffiti (1979), Superstition (1982) and Purple People Eater (1988).

In 1991, Houghton returned to The Young and the Restless and also The Bold and the Beautiful as a script writer, a position he held into the 2000s. He is also credited along with his sister, Mona Houghton, for writing several episodes of the long-running series, Knots Landing.

Houghton died of peritoneal mesothelioma on August 27, 2024, at the age of 75. His death was not announced until February 28, 2025.

== Awards and nominations ==
Daytime Emmy Awards

- WINS (1992, 1997, 2000, 2006; Best Writing Team; The Young and the Restless)
- NOMINATIONS (1993, 1994, 1995, 1998, 1999, 2001, 2003, 2004 & 2005; Best Writing; The Young and the Restless)

Writers Guild of America Award

- WGA WINS (2002 & 2005 seasons; The Young and the Restless)
- WGA NOMINATIONS (1999 & 2001 seasons; The Young and the Restless)
