= Snapper Foster =

Fictional character from the American CBS soap opera The Young and the Restless

- The Young and the Restless character
- Portrayed by: William Gray Espy (1973–75, 2003); David Hasselhoff (1975–82, 2010)
- Duration: 1973–82, 2003, 2010
- First appearance: March 26, 1973
- Last appearance: June 21, 2010
- Created by: William J. Bell
In-universe information
- Other names: William Foster, Jr.
- Occupation: Physician; Founder of a free clinic in Genoa City; Resident at Genoa City Memorial Hospital; Intern at Genoa City Memorial Hospital; Graduate of Genoa City Medical School
- Father: Bill Foster
- Mother: Elizabeth Foster
- Brothers: Greg Foster
- Sisters: Jill Foster Abbott (adoptive)
- Wife: Chris Brooks Foster (1974–)
- Sons: Chuckie Roulland
- Daughters: Jennifer Foster
- Uncles: Bruce Henderson
- Nephews: Phillip Chancellor III (adoptive); Billy Abbott (adoptive)
- First cousins: Mark Henderson; Lorie Brooks
- Other relatives: Chance Chancellor (adoptive); Cordelia Abbott (adoptive); Johnny Abbott (adoptive); Katie Newman Abbott (adoptive)

Snapper Foster is a fictional character on the CBS daytime soap opera The Young and the Restless. An original character since the show's inception, the role was played by William Gray Espy from March 26, 1973 to September 26, 1975, and David Hasselhoff from December 8, 1975 to April 30, 1982. Espy briefly reprised the character from February 28, 2003 to March 5, 2003, and Hasselhoff briefly reprised the role from June 15–21, 2010.

== Conception and casting ==
With The Young and the Restless originally conceived as focusing on two core families, the wealthy Brookses and the poor Fosters, Snapper was designed as the oldest son of the latter. As a student going through medical school, the character was given the nickname "Snapper" because of his personality of quickly snapping on people with whom he disagreed.

Since show co-creator William J. Bell wanted to hire relatively unknown actors for his original cast, William Gray Espy was eventually selected to portray Snapper. Espy played the character for about two years before leaving the show in 1975.

Then-unknown actor David Hasselhoff was picked to replace Espy. Snapper would be Hasselhoff's first major television role. He spent six years playing the character before leaving The Young and the Restless in 1982 to star in the television show Knight Rider. Hasselhoff's decision to quit the soap opera was one of the major factors that led to Bell phasing out the Foster family (sans the youngest sibling Jill) and turning the focus to relatively newer characters like Victor Newman.

Espy reprised Snapper for a few episodes in 2003, revolving around a storyline where his sister Jill discovers that she was actually adopted by the Fosters as a child. Hasselhoff would then later be invited back to play Snapper again for a few episodes in 2010. Reacting to the invitation, he said:

In 1976 [sic], Bill Bell, creator of America's No. 1 soap opera, took a chance on a young and very green actor. Playing Snapper in 850 shows during the six years I appeared molded my craft, my attitude and my work ethic. Being asked to come back to appear in several episodes gives me a chance to say thanks, as I have an amazing amount of respect and heartfelt emotion for Bill, his family and my time on 'Young and the Restless.'

== Storylines ==
=== 1973–1982 ===
As the series opened up in 1973, 24-year-old medical student Snapper Foster was juggling his feelings for two women: Chris Brooks the daughter of newspaper mogul Stuart Brooks; and Sally McGuire, a waitress who worked at Pierre's.

Stuart was not thrilled when Snapper caught the eye of his trusting daughter, Chris. Stuart was less offended by Snapper's blue-collar roots than by his indifference to Chris. Handsome Snapper was not only putting himself through medical school, but being "man of the family" after his father, William "Bill" Foster, deserted them seven years earlier. As the eldest son, Snapper was helping his mom Liz Foster who worked as a factory worker, put his brother Greg through law school and keeping a big-brother eye on his sister Jill Foster who dreamed of being a fashion model while working as a beautician. Liz wished the best for all her children and encouraged Snapper to pursue a nice, well-bred girl like Chris. However, with enough obligations already, Snapper preferred to keep his freedom. However, Snapper was already seeing Sally McGuire. One evening, Chris invited Snapper to the Brooks home for dinner but he didn't show. After a day at school and work he had visited Sally, fell asleep and she conveniently forgot to wake him as he had asked. His half-truth—that he fell asleep after a full day—satisfied Chris enough to get her through the hurt of disappointment. Stuart, however, grew more displeased with Snapper. When Stuart learned that Snapper was seeing Sally, he was quick to tell Chris that Snapper was cheating on her. Chris moved out and went to work as a secretary for Snapper's brother Greg, unaware that Stuart had financially helped his new law practice in return for her employment. When she found out, she angrily quit. Greg was especially saddened because he had fallen in love with Chris.

Chris was raped by a man named George Curtis and the rape left her traumatized until she found it hard to make love with Snapper and refused to have sex with him even though she loved him very much. Snapper showed a great deal of patience and respect for Chris, offering her emotional support but finding his own sexual pleasure with lover Sally. Sally had fallen in love with Snapper, too, and was desperate to keep him. In spite of her friend Brad Eliot's advice that she'd only end up getting hurt, Sally decided to use a desperate single woman's oldest trick. She threw away her birth control pills and got pregnant by Snapper. Meanwhile, Snapper was growing more and more fond of Chris. He broke off with Sally without knowing he would be the father of her child. With Snapper's encouragement, Chris was able to file charges against her attacker. Unfortunately, because of lack of evidence, he was not convicted. Determined all the more to stand by her side, Snapper proposed marriage. It took him a long time to get her to accept, but Chris finally did and they became engaged. Sally was devastated when she found out about Snapper's engagement and took a drug overdose, but Brad saved her life when he found her and rushed her to the hospital. Later when Sally was out and about again, she intended to tell Snapper that he had gotten her pregnant, hoping he would break his engagement to Chris and marry her instead. Liz found out and successfully did her best to change Sally's mind about interfering with Snapper's future. Sally accepted Pierre's proposal and they eloped a few days before Chris and Snapper. Although Snapper overheard the conversation between Sally and Liz, Snapper had no intention of changing his plans. He and Chris exchanged their vows in a lovely ceremony. After an uneasy sexual start, Chris and Snapper worked through her problems and were happy together, living in a small apartment. When Chris became pregnant, however, Snapper's pleasure was tinged by fears that having another responsibility might hinder his medical career aspirations. When Sally's husband Pierre was killed, Sally wanted to leave town, but Snapper urged her to stay until the baby was born. Eventually, Snapper confessed to Sally that he wanted to keep an eye on her because he feared that her unborn baby might have been injured by her recent suicide attempt, which occurred during the time she learned about Snapper and Chris's engagement. Sally gave birth to her and Snapper's son, Pierre Charles (aka Chuckie). Feeling sympathy for Sally's plight of raising a baby alone, Chris encouraged Snapper to spend time with Sally and her baby. However, Chris eventually realized that Snapper was the baby's father and Snapper confirmed Chris's fears. Distraught, Chris suffered a miscarriage. Soon after, she separated from Snapper and accepted a job as a social worker in Legal Aid working for Greg. Meanwhile, Sally moved to Chicago. With Sally out of the way, Chris and Snapper soon afterwards reconciled.

In 1975, Snapper had finally convinced Liz to have his father Bill declared legally dead. Unknown to Liz and her children, Bill was alive in a town nearby. Later, Bill resumed contact with the family, via a letter, after he was diagnosed with cancer. With the exception of Snapper, the entire Foster family embraced Bill's return. Shortly after Bill returned, he collapsed and was rushed to the hospital as Snapper detected Bill's ailing health. The following year, Snapper had long made amends with his father, but Bill's cancer had progressed leading to him being on life-support. Snapper later found himself in legal trouble after he was accused of killing Bill when it was actually his mother Liz who pulled Bill's life-support system, which left Liz traumatized and led to her suffering a stroke and forgetting her actions. With Greg's help, Snapper was cleared of murder charges. Snapper after this left the hospital and opened up his own clinic.

In the late 1970s, Snapper and Chris had become foster parents for a little girl named Karen Becker as her mother Nancy was institutionalized and her father Ron was a rapist. When both Ron and Nancy became more stable, Snapper and Chris returned custody of Karen to the Beckers.

By 1981, Snapper and Chris had given birth to their daughter who they named Jennifer Elizabeth Foster after Chris's late mother Jennifer Brooks and Snapper's mother Liz. After Jennifer's birth, Snapper was opposed to Chris's idea of getting a bigger home. Soon after, Snapper's former lover, Sally McGuire, re-entered Snapper's life with their son, Chuckie, who was seriously ill. While Chuckie was hospitalized with a kidney problem, Sally realized that she was still attracted to Snapper, but Snapper was adamant that she move on with her life. When Chuckie was cured, Snapper shared an emotional good-bye with both Sally and Chuckie as they returned home with Sally's fiancee, Stan. One month later, Snapper left town, and Chris joined him a few months after that. At some point Sally & Stan divorced and Chuckie discovered that Snapper was his father.

=== 2003, 2010 ===
Snapper briefly returned to town in 2003 when Liz broke the news to Jill that the Fosters were not her biological family.

In 2010, Liz was making a visit to Genoa City to visit Jill and brought Snapper along with her as a surprise, but Jill and Kay quickly left for the hospital after receiving a call about an ailing Liz, who was rushed to the hospital after she had collapsed shortly after she and Snapper got off their plane. The hospital allowed Snapper doctor privileges in order to work on Liz, who on her deathbed confessed a secret to Snapper about Jill's true parentage.

== Reception ==
In 2022, Charlie Mason from Soaps She Knows placed Snapper 12th on his list of the best 25 characters from The Young and the Restless, commenting "The first in a long, long line of playboys on The Young and the Restless, this med student — most famously played by The Hoff — could have coined the term "playing doctor." In addition, throughout the 1970s, he was the Rx for any and every storyline lull."
