= Brenda Dickson =

American actress

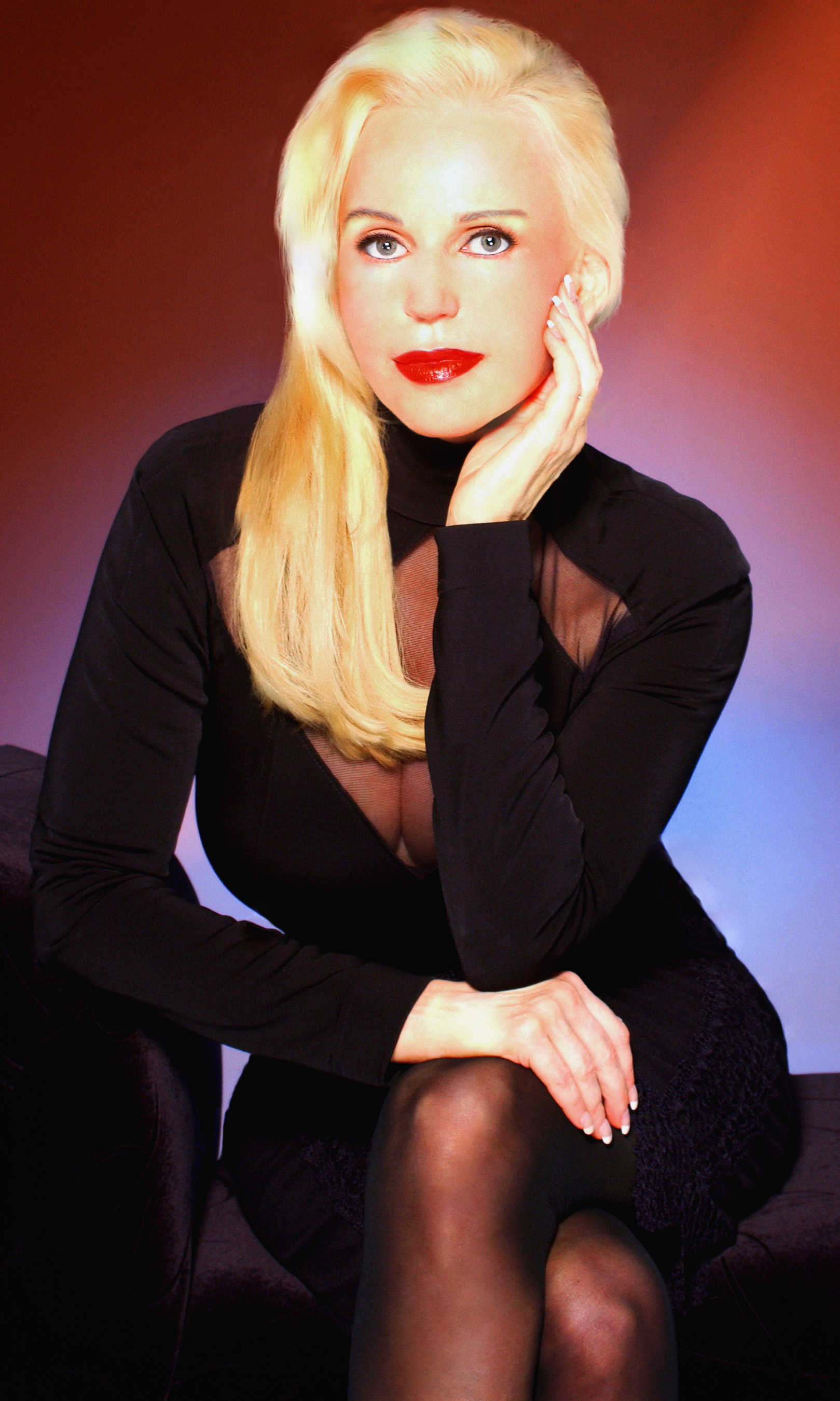
- Born: Long Beach, California, U.S.
- Other name: Brenda Dickson-Weinberg
- Education: Lee Strasberg Theatre and Film Institute
- Occupation: Former Actress
- Spouses: Robert Rifkin (m. 1976; div. 1983) Jan Weinberg (m. 1997; div. 2006)

Brenda Irene Dickson is an American actress who originated the role of Jill Foster Abbott on the soap opera The Young and the Restless.

== Early life and education ==
Dickson was born in Long Beach, California. As a teenager, she toured Southeast Asia singing and dancing for the armed forces with Bob Hope. At the age of 17, she won the title of Miss California USA in the Miss World pageant; it led to acting offers but she decided to continue performing at USO shows while studying acting at the Lee Strasberg Theatre and Film Institute in Los Angeles.

== Career ==
Dickson made her stage debut at the Beverly Hills Playhouse and went on to appear in stage roles in the Los Angeles area. She made her feature film debut in the 1972 film Deathmaster. She appeared in guest roles on Men at Law; The F.B.I.; Love, American Style; Here We Go Again; and the prime-time soap opera Falcon Crest.

Dickson played the role of Jill Foster Abbott on The Young and the Restless from 1973 to 1980, then again from 1983 to 1987. Dickson was let go from the show in 1987. She filed a $10 million lawsuit against Columbia Pictures in an effort to be reinstated. In the lawsuit, Dickson claimed William J. Bell blacklisted her and wreaked havoc on her personal and professional life by hiring "Mafia cartel judges and attorneys" to "ruin" her life. As a result, she ended up "broke and homeless" and claimed to have been blocked from working.

In 1987, Dickson released the film Welcome to My Home, described as a "vanity film" which showcased her home and wardrobe. A YouTube parody became an Internet meme and has been removed and re-uploaded several times. In 2018, its influence was profiled in Vanity Fair. Dickson, who was interviewed for the article, revealed that she financed the film with $5,000 of her own money.

In May 2013, Dickson released her memoir, My True Hidden Hollywood Story.

== Personal life ==
=== Marriages ===
Dickson has been married twice. Her first husband was dentist Robert Rifkin whom she married on September 30, 1976. She married attorney Jan Weinberg on December 25, 1997. They were divorced in 2006.

=== Legal issues ===
In 2007, Dickson was jailed in Hawaii because of a civil contempt order stemming from a divorce judgment from her ex-husband, Jan Weinberg. Dickson claimed she was in fact the victim and wasn't given a fair divorce hearing. She was released from jail after 16 days; however, she was sent back for a further 3 months.

In 2009, the judgment in Weinberg v. Dickson was set aside after an appeals court found that the judge in the original trial had abused his discretion in not guaranteeing Dickson a fair trial and that her imprisonment had been unlawful.

In September 2025, Dickson revealed that she had been evicted from her condo and was now homeless. She requested that her followers on social media donate to her GoFundMe page. The money would be used for an attorney, food and shelter.

On July 9, 2026, Dickson was arrested on a battery charge in Los Angeles following a dispute with her landlord. It was later reported the charges had been dismissed due to the landlords claims Dickson had slapped his daughter were found untrue.

== Filmography ==
Year	Title	Role	Notes
1971	Men at Law		Episode: "One American"
1972	The F.B.I.	Donna	Episode: "The Set-Up"
1972	Deathmaster	Rona	
1973	Love, American Style	Girl	Segment: "Love and the Sexpert"
1973	Here We Go Again	Donna	Episode: "There's a Boy in My Rumaki"
1973–1980; 1983–1987	The Young and the Restless	Jill Foster Abbott	Contract role: March 27, 1973 – January 9, 1980, September 8, 1983 – June 18, 1987, June 22 – 24, 1987
1976	Taxi Driver	Soap Opera Woman	Archive footage from The Young and the Restless
1983	Falcon Crest	Tony's Girlfriend	Episode: "Maelstrom"

== Awards and nominations ==
- 1986 Soap Opera Digest Award nomination for Outstanding Villainess in a Daytime Serial The Young and the Restless.
- 1988 Soap Opera Digest Award for Outstanding Villainess in a Daytime Serial The Young and the Restless.
