= William Gray Espy =

American actor (born 1948)

William Gray Espy (born July 19, 1948 in Dothan, Alabama, U.S.) is an actor, best known for roles in serials such as The Young and the Restless as William "Snapper" Foster (1973-1975, 2003) and Another World as Mitch Blake (1979-1982, 1986-1990).

Espy also appeared in the 1977 movie Haunts, and had a guest-starring role in 1984 on the popular Miami Vice.

He left acting in the early 1990s and returned to Alabama to take care of family matters. He is devoted to preserving and reforesting land and developing a wildlife habitat for turkey, quail, and deer.

He currently resides in Dothan, Alabama.
