= List of previous The Young and the Restless cast members =

This is a list of past cast members on the CBS Daytime soap opera, The Young and the Restless.

== Previous cast members ==
Actor	Character(s)	Duration
Philip Abbott	Grant Stevens	1986
Robert Ackerman	John Harding	1981
Wanda Acuna	Keesha Monroe	1995
Deborah Adair	Jill Abbott	1980–83, 1986
R. J. Adams	Doctor Kirst	1978
R. J. Adams	Dave	1981
R. J. Adams	Officer Griffen	1994
Marla Adams	Dina Abbott Mergeron	1983–86, 1991, 1996, 2008, 2017–20
Robert Adamson	Noah Newman	2012–18, 2020
Josh Albee	Tony Baker	1979–80
John Alden	Nicholas Newman	1991–94
Sarah Aldrich	Victoria Newman	1997
Marilyn Alex	Molly Carter	1991–93, 1995
Tatyana Ali	Roxanne	2007–13
Hunter Allan	Noah Newman	2005–08
Laur Allen	Juliet Helton	2017
Christopher Allport	Gene Desmond	2000
Victoria Ann Lewis	Doris Collins	1994
Beverly Archer	Shirley Sherwood	1999
Lamon Archey	Mason Wilder	2012–14
Carmen Argenziano	Dennis Ellroy	2008–09
Tina Arning	Sasha Green	1995–97, 2002
Rod Arrants	Steven Lassiter	1987–88
Nina Arvesen	Cassandra Rawlins	1988–91
Linden Ashby	Cameron Kirsten	2003–04, 2023–25
Ryan Ashton	Zack Stinnett	2017
Matthew Atkinson	Austin Travers	2014–15
Sherman Augustus	Hank Weber	2002–05
Ethel Ayler	Nurse Potter	1997
Obba Babatundé	Carter Campbell	2007
Catherine Bach	Anita Lawson	2012–19
Pamela Bach	Mari Jo Mason	1994
Penn Badgley	Chance Chancellor	2000–01
Julia D'Arcy Badinger	Ashley Abbott	2018
Samantha Bailey	Summer Newman	2009–12
Victoria Barabas	Quinn	2013
Tammy Barr	Reporter	2005
Tammy Barr	Patty Williams	2009
Diana Barton	Mari Jo Mason	1994–96
Peter Barton	Scott Grainger, Sr.	1988–93
Ashley Bashioum	Mackenzie Browning	1999–2002, 2004–05
William Bassett	Pete Walker	1982–83
Meredith Baxter	Maureen Russell	2014
Robert Beecher	Willy	1986
Fred Beir	Mitchell Sherman	1975–80
Nick Benedict	Michael Scott	1980–81
Meg Bennett	Julia Newman	1980–84, 1986–87, 2002, 2018, 2020
Carlos Bernard	Rafael Delgado	1999
Frank M. Bernard	Marc Mergeron	1984, 1987–88
Wilson Bethel	Ryder Callahan	2009–11
Jack Betts	Roberto	2002
Leslie Bevis	Ruth Perkins	1998–99
Thom Bierdz	Phillip Chancellor III	1986–89, 2004, 2009–11
Dick Billingsley	Phillip Chancellor III	1978–81
Laura Bryan Birn	Lynne Bassett	1988–2005
Sean Blakemore	Ben	2004
Vail Bloom	Heather Stevens	2007–10, 2023–24
Donny Boaz	Chance Chancellor	2019–21
Vasili Bogazianos	Al Fenton	1998–99
Jay Bontatibus	Tony Viscardi	1999–2000
Roscoe Born	Tom Fisher	2005–06, 2009
Denise Boutte	Imani Benedict	2022
William Boyett	Walter Edmonson	1986
Katrina Bowden	Flo Fulton	2021
Philip Boyd	David	2003
Jeff Branson	Ronan Malloy	2010–12
Robin Braxton	Lillie Belle Barber	1994
Danny Breen	Alvin Peyser/Clerk	1986, 1993
Jared Breeze	Max Rayburn	2016
Brooke Marie Bridges	Lily Winters	1997–98, 2000
Darin Brooks	Wyatt Spencer	2021
Randy Brooks	Nathan Hastings	1992–94
Kimberlin Brown	Sheila Carter	1990–95, 2005–06
Kimberlin Brown	Sugar	2005–06
Peter Brown	Robert Laurence	1981–82, 1990
Ryan Brown	Billy Abbott	2002–03
Sylvia Browne	Herself	2006–07
Karl Bruck	Maestro Faustch	1974–82, 1984–85
Ian Buchanan	James Warwick	1995
Jensen Buchanan	Elise Moxley	2015–16
Lachlan Buchanan	Kyle Abbott	2015–16
Richard Burgi	Ashland Locke	2021–22
John Burke	Calvin Boudreau	2019
Brendan Burns	Glenn Richards	1989, 1991–93, 1995–97, 1999, 2001, 2003–06
Steve Burton	Dylan McAvoy	2013–17
Lindsay Bushman	Summer Newman	2012
Darcy Rose Byrnes	Abby Newman	2003–08
Barry Cahill	Sam Powers	1974–75
Sasha Calle	Lola Rosales	2018–21
Jason Canela	Arturo Rosales	2018–20
Lisa Canning	Adrienne Markham	2004–05
Cathy Carricaburu	Nancy Becker	1976–78
Sean Carrigan	Stitch Rayburn	2013–17, 2021
Colleen Casey	Farren Connor	1985–87
Martin Cassidy	Frank Grainger	1986
Tricia Cast	Nina Webster	1986–2001, 2008–14, 2020–21, 2023, 2025
John Considine	Phillip Chancellor II	1973–74
John Castellanos	John Silva	1989–2004
Loyita Chapel	Judy Wilson	1980–81
Erin Chambers	Melanie Daniels	2013
Judith Chapman	Jill Abbott	1994
Judith Chapman	Gloria Abbott Bardwell	2005–18, 2020–21
Don Chastain	Alan Carey	2000
Nick Chastain	Alex	2004, 2006
Colby Chester	Michael Crawford	1985–90
Chino XL	Buzz	2004
Eddie Cibrian	Matt Clark	1994–96
Aidan Clark	Charlie Ashby	2013–16
Robert Clary	Pierre Roulland	1973–74
Tamara Clatterbuck	Alice Johnson	1998–2000, 2005, 2017
Keith Hamilton Cobb	Damon Porter	2003–05
Robert Colbert	Stuart Brooks	1973–83
Dennis Cole	Lance Prentiss	1981–82
Signy Coleman	Hope Wilson	1993–97, 2000, 2002, 2008, 2010, 2012
Chase Coleman	Tanner Watts	2020
Gary Collins	Harry Curtis	2000
Jessica Collins	Avery Bailey Clark	2011–15
Phoenix and Zion Collins	Moses Winters	2011–13
Darlene Conley	Rose DeVille	1979–80, 1986–87
Terri Conn	Model	1995
Sid Conrad	Judge Patrick Sullivan	1986
Zack Conroy	Oliver Jones	2013
John David Conti	Elevator Technician	1998
John David Conti	Andy	2004
Angell Conwell	Leslie Michaelson	2010–17, 2019
Carolyn Conwell	Marion Reeves	1977
Carolyn Conwell	Mary Williams	1980–2004
Jeanne Cooper	Katherine Chancellor	1973–2013
Jeanne Cooper	Marge Cotrooke	1989–90, 2008–09
Jeff Cooper	Derek Thurston	1976
Alicia Coppola	Meredith Gates	2016
Michael Corbett	David Kimble	1986–91
Melinda Cordell	Dorothy Stevens	1980–82, 1993
Melinda Cordell	Madame Estelle Chavin	1990–94
Bayley Corman	Summer Newman	2018
Christopher Cousins	Alan Laurent	2024
Christopher Cousins	Martin Laurent	2024–26
Grant Cramer	Shawn Garrett	1985–86
Grant Cramer	Adam Hunter	1996
Barbara Crampton	Leanna Love	1987–93, 1998–2002, 2006–07, 2023
Lee Crawford	Sally McGuire	1973–74, 1981–82
Steven Culp	Brian Hamilton	1995
Todd Curtis	Skip Evans	1983–93
Abby Dalton	Lydia Callahan	1995
Linwood Dalton	Jared Markson	1984–85
Candice Daly	Veronica Landers	1997–98
Bianca and Chiara D'Ambrosio	Summer Newman	2008
Linda Dangcil	Mrs Martinez	2004
Edgar Daniels	Sebastian Crown	1980
Shell Danielson	Bunny Hutchinson	2001
Brooks Darnell	Nate Hastings	2018–19
Doug Davidson	Paul Williams	1978–2020
Josie Davis	Grace Turner	1996–97
Terie Lynn Davis	Lydia Callahan	1996
June Dayton	Mr Wilcox's Housekeeper	1986
Marita De Leon	Joani Garza	1995–98
Lee Debroux	John Harding	1981
Dick DeCoit	Ron Becker	1976–78
Diana DeGarmo	Angelina Veneziano	2011–12
John Denos	Joe Blair	1983–87
Mark Derwin	Adrian Hunter	1989–90
Geoffrey Deuel	Dave Campbell	1977
Don Diamont	Brad Carlton	1985–96, 1998–2009
Don Diamont	Bill Spencer, Jr.	2021
Brenda Dickson	Jill Foster Abbott	1973–80, 1983–87
Maria DiDomenico	Alyssa Montalvo	2020
Elinor Donahue	Marie Anderson	2010–11
Norma Donaldson	Lillie Belle Barber	1990–94
Alex Donnelley	Diane Jenkins	1982–84, 1986, 1996–2001
Christopher Douglas	Sean Bridges	2001
Damon Douglas	Roger	1986
Jerry Douglas	John Abbott	1982–2013, 2015–16
Jerry Douglas	Alistair Wallingford	2008
J. Downing	Clarence	2014
Phil Dozois	Frank Barritt	1995, 1997, 2003–04
John Driscoll	Phillip Chancellor IV	2009–11
Denice Duff	Amanda Browning	2001–02
Olive Dunbar	Margaret	1986
John Dye	Jason Carter	1986
Max Ehrich	Fenmore Baldwin	2012–15
Cindy Eilbacher	Jody Conway	1977
Cindy Eilbacher	April Stevens	1979–82, 1992–94
Robin Eisenman	Nikki Newman	1984
Scott Elrod	Joe Clark	2014–15
Chris Engen	Adam Newman	2008–09
John Enos III	Bobby Marsino	2003–05
Brenda Epperson	Ashley Abbott	1988–95
Stephanie Erb	Janice Mead	2014
William Gray Espy	Snapper Foster	1973–75, 2003
Andrea Evans	Patty Williams	1983–84
Andrea Evans	Tawny Moore	2010
Michael Evans	Douglas Austin	1980–85, 1987–95
Vanessa Lee Evigan	Brittany Hodges	1999–2000
Michael Fairman	Patrick Murphy	2008–14
Sharon Farrell	Florence Webster	1991–96
Jonathan Farwell	George Rawlins	1988-90
Walter Fauntleroy	Nate Hastings	2011
Susan Flannery	Stephanie Forrester	1993
Sean Patrick Flanery	Sam Gibson	2011
Johanna Flores	Adriana Stone	2013
Marco and Stefan Flores	Nicholas Newman	1989
Conner Floyd	Chance Chancellor	2021–25
Melinda O. Fee	Jill Foster	1984
Lyndsy Fonseca	Colleen Carlton	2001–05
Clementine Ford	Mackenzie Browning	2009–10
Stephen Sean Ford	Steven	2005
Steven Ford	Andy Richards	1981–87, 2002–03
Genie Francis	Genevieve Atkinson	2011–12
Bonnie Franklin	Sister Celeste	2012
Margarita Franco	Mrs Martinez	2012, 2016–17
Adrienne Frantz	Amber Moore	2006–10, 2013
Jonathan Fraser	Tom Fisher	2004
Dee Freeman	Nurse	1997
Dee Freeman	Judge	2009
Brady and Cooper Friedman	Connor Newman	2013
Alan Fudge	Stan Kinsey	1999
Gunner and Ryder Gadbois	Connor Newman	2015–18
Steve Gagnon	Terry McAvoy	2013
Robert Gant	David Sherman	2013–17
Jennifer Gareis	Grace Turner	1997–2000, 2002, 2004, 2014
Beverly Garland	Katherine Chancellor	1981
Joy Garrett	Boobsie Caswell Austin	1983–85
Kelly Garrison	Rebecca Harper	1990
Kelly Garrison	Hilary Lancaster	1991–93
Sean Garrison	John Abbott	1980
Brian Gaskill	Seth Morgan	2024
Justin Gaston	Chance Chancellor	2020
Jennifer Gatti	Keesha Monroe	1995–96
Anthony Geary	George Curtis	1973
Deborah Geffner	Gwendolyn Gardner	2020
Carlton Gebbia	Janina	1999
Yani Gellman	Rafe Torres	2008–12
Sabryn Genet	Tricia Dennison McNeil	1997–2001
Roslyn Gentle	Linda Franklin	2023
Donald Gibb	Worm	2003
Amy Gibson	Alana Anthony	1985
John Gibson	Jerry "Cash" Cashman	1980–82
Robert Gibson	David Mallory	1976–78
Rory Gibson	Noah Newman	2021–25
Cam Gigandet	Daniel Romalotti	2004
Hannah and Jessica Gist	Scotty Grainger	1993–94
Bond Gideon	Jill Foster	1980
Daniel Goddard	Cane Ashby	2007–19
Daniel Goddard	Caleb Atkinson	2011
Richard Gleason	Matt Miller	2018
Linsey Godfrey	Caroline Spencer	2014
Siena Goines	Callie Rogers	1998–2000
Ricky Paull Goldin	Gary Dawson	1999–2000
Noemi Gonzalez	Mia Rosales	2018–19
Justin Gorence	Peter Garrett	1995–98
Kelli Goss	Courtney Sloane	2013–15
Mckenna Grace	Faith Newman	2013–15
Jacob Aaron Gaines	Moses Winters	2021–22
Antione Grant	Giancarlo	2022
Bruce Gray	Mark Wilcox	1986
Charles H. Gray	William "Bill" Foster, Sr.	1975–76
Veleka Gray	Ruby Collins	1983
Veleka Gray	Sharon Reaves	1983–84
Michael Graziadei	Daniel Romalotti	2004–13, 2016
Alice Greczyn	Emma Randall	2015
Darla and Sandra Greer	Chloe Mitchell	1990–91
Dorothy Green	Jennifer Brooks	1973–77
James Michael Gregary	Clint Radison	1989–91, 2009
Stephen Gregory	Chase Benson	1988–91
Michael Gross	River Baldwin	2008–09
Bennet Guillory	Walter Barber	1992–94
Cooper and Oliver Guynes	Kyle Abbott	2002
Maggie Gwin	Hope Wilson	2020
Brett Hadley	Carl Williams	1980–91, 1998–99
Daniel Hall	Scotty Grainger	2017–18
Deidre Hall	Barbara Anderson	1973–75
Tom Hallick	Brad Elliot	1973–78
Brett Halsey	John Abbott	1980–81
James Handy	Governor	2009-11
Lynn Hamilton	Mae Dawson	1997
Lynne Harbaugh	Lisa Mansfield	1988–89
Holden and Ryan Hare	Johnny Abbott	2012–21
Gabriella Hart	Cindy	2022
Justin Hartley	Adam Newman	2014–16
Justin Hartley	Gabriel Bingham	2015
David Hasselhoff	Snapper Foster	1975–82, 2010
Wings Hauser	Greg Foster	1977–81, 2010
Jessica Heap	Eden Baldwin	2011–13
Rick Hearst	Matt Clark	2000–01
Kay Heberle	Joann Curtis	1975–78
Chris Hebert	Phillip Chancellor III	1981–82
David Hedison	Arthur Hendricks	2004
Ben Hermes	Benjamin Hochman	2017
Sophia and Angelia Hert	Summer Newman	2008–09
Briana Nicole Henry	Esmeralda	2013–14
Karen Hensel	Doris Collins	1994–2003, 2005, 2008–09, 2011–12
Kelley Menighan Hensley	Emily Stewart	2007
John Michael Herndon	Homeless Man	2016
Anthony Herrera	Jack Curtis	1975–77
Christopher Holder	Kevin Bancroft	1982–84
Randy Holland	Rick Daros	1983–84
Blake Hood	Kyle Abbott	2012–13
Erica Hope	Nikki Newman	1978–79
James Houghton	Greg Foster	1973–76, 2003
Ken Howard	George Summers	2012
Alice Hunter	Kerry Johnson	2018–19
Brody Hutzler	Cody Dixon	1999–2004
James Hyde	Jeremy Stark	2022–23
Vincent Irizarry	David Chow	2007–08
James Ivy	Jeremy Ross	1997
Jeremiah Jahi	Dr Huffman	2022
Laura James	Jane	2018
Erika Jayne	Farrah Dubose	2016–18
Burgess Jenkins	Billy Abbott	2014–16
Gladys Jimenez	Ramona Caceres	1999–2000, 2002
Jossara Jinaro	Rosa	2006
Jay Kenneth Johnson	Brendon	1999
Tyler Johnson	Theo Vanderway	2019–21
Ashley Jones	Megan Dennison	1997–2001
Bryant Jones	Nate Hastings	1996–2002
Malese Jow	Hannah	2008
David Joyner	Keith Joyner	2008
Sean Kanan	Deacon Sharpe	2009–12, 2022
Shannon Kane	Monica	2007
Mitzi Kapture	Anita Hodges	2002–05
Jennifer Karr	Ellen Winters	1986–87
Lesli Kay	Felicia Forrester	2008
Beau Kazer	Brock Reynolds	1974–80, 1984–86, 1990–92, 1999–2004, 2008–11, 2013
Jimmy Keegan	Phillip Chancellor III	1983
Sally Kellerman	Constance Bingham	2014–15
George Kennedy	Albert Miller	2003, 2010
Jay Kerr	Brian Forbes	1982–83
Elara and Rhea Kerwin	Summer Newman	2006–08
Brian Kerwin	Greg Foster	1976–77
Christian Keyes	Ripley Turner	2020
Andre Khabbazi	Alec Moretti	1997–98
Anna Khaja	Dr Malone	2022
Rachel Kimsey	Mackenzie Browning	2005–06
B.B. King	Himself	2001
Hunter King	Summer Newman	2012–16, 2018–22
Kent Masters King	Drucilla Winters	2000
Darnell Kirkwood	Jordan Wilde	2017–18
Heath Kizzier	Joshua Landers	1996–98
Luke Kleintank	Noah Newman	2010–11
Michael E. Knight	Simon Neville	2015–16
Kristian Kordula	Craig Shields	2017
Lauren Koslow	Lindsey Wells	1984–86
Lauren Koslow	Jill Abbott	2026
Bert Kramer	Brent Davis	1984–85
Casey Kramer	Homeless Woman	2013
Kelly Kruger	Mackenzie Browning	2002–03, 2018–19
Jerry Lacy	Jonas	1979–82
Joe LaDue	Derek Thurston	1977–81, 1984
David Lago	Raul Guittierez	1999–2004, 2009, 2018
Sal Landi	Clint Radison	1988–89
Jennifer Landon	Heather Stevens	2012
Allison Lanier	Summer Newman	2022–25
Katherine Kelly Lang	Gretchen	1981
Katherine Kelly Lang	Brooke Logan	1999, 2007
Jill Larson	Connie Ross	2014
Russell Latham	Russell/Eric, NYC hairstylist	1994–2005
Greg Lauren	Brett Nelson	1998–99
John Phillip Law	Jim Grainger	1989
Russell Lawrence	Matt Clark	2000
Chene Lawson	Yolanda Hamilton	2005–06, 2023–24
Adam Lazarre-White	Nathan Hastings	1994–96, 2000
Tristan Lake Leabu	Reed Hellstrom	2016–20
Ken Lally	Richie	2016
Jennifer Leak	Gwen Sherman	1974–75
Owen and Henry Leark	Connor Newman	2014–15
Michael Learned	Katherine Chancellor	2011
Griffin Ledner	Nicholas Newman	1990–91
Amanda Leighton	Raven	2013–14
Anne Leighton	Stephanie Gayle	2013
Roberta Leighton	Casey Reed	1978–81, 1984–89, 1998
Elizabeth Leiner	Tara Locke	2021
Stephanie Lemelin	Jenna Kieran-Rayburn	2014
Adrianne Leon	Colleen Carlton	2006–07
Terry Lester	Jack Abbott	1980–89
Tom Ligon	Lucas Prentiss	1977–82
Alyvia Alyn Lind	Faith Newman	2011–21
Karina Logue	Helen Copeland	2014
William Long, Jr.	Wayne Stevens	1980–82
Tony Longo	Ray/Fred Caffey	1999–2006
Eva Longoria	Isabella Braña Williams	2001–03
Loren Lott	Ana Hamilton	2018–19, 2024
Rianna Loving	Rianna Miner	1999–2000
Heather Lowe	Cynthia Harris	1977–78
Thad Luckinbill	J. T. Hellstrom	1999–2010, 2017–19, 2023
Thad Luckinbill	Nicholas Newman	2018
Nic Luken	Theo Vanderway	2019
Aaron Lustig	Tim Reid	1996–97, 2002, 2012
Janice Lynde	Leslie Brooks	1973–77, 2018, 2021
Ryan MacDonald	Robert Haskell	1989–90
Gisele MacKenzie	Katherine Chancellor	1986
Ann Magnuson	Madame Miranda	2013
Victoria Mallory	Leslie Brooks	1977–82, 1984
Vanessa Marano	Eden Baldwin	2008–10
Eva Marcille	Tyra Hamilton	2008–09
Heidi Mark	Sharon Newman	1994
Cathy Marks	Dina Abbott Mergeron	2018
Frank Marth	Lt. Phil Parker	1986
John H. Martin	Frederick Hodges	2002–05
Devon Martinez	Shawn Taylor	2016
Margaret Mason	Eve Howard	1980–84, 1993
Brian Matthews	Eric Garrison	1983–85
Brad Maule	Reverend Palmer	2004
Mara McCaffray	Natalie Soderberg	2016
Julianna McCarthy	Liz Foster	1973–86, 1993, 2003–04, 2008, 2010
Cady McClain	Kelly Andrews	2014–15
Leigh McCloskey	Kurt Costner	1996–97, 2013
Tom McConnell	Shawn Garrett	1984
John McCook	Lance Prentiss	1976–80
John McCook	Eric Forrester	1993, 1995–96, 2005, 2008, 2013, 2017, 2021
Darius McCrary	Malcolm Winters	2009–11
Ed McCready	Will Ashland	1986
Asher and Brayden McDonell	Connor Newman	2015
Howard McGillin	Greg Foster	1981–82
Dorothy McGuire	Cora Miller	1984
Chris McKenna	Mark Harding	2014–15
Dawn McMillan	Drucilla Winters	1996
Will McMillan	Jerry Gunderson	2004
Jim McMullan	Brent Davis	1984
Sam McMurray	Dwight	2022
Terrence E. McNally	Robert Lynch	1993–94
Hugh McPhillips	Andre	1986
Raya Meddine	Sabrina Costelana Newman	2008–10
Eddie Mekka	Bud	2011
Tracy Melchior	Veronica Landers	1996–97
Ernestine Mercer	Millie Johnson	1997–2000
Freeman Michaels	Drake Belson	1995–96
Jeanna Michaels	Karen Richards	1981–82
Kerry Leigh Michaels	Monique	1991
Ashley Nicole Millan	Victoria Newman	1982–90
Billy Miller	Billy Abbott	2008–14
William Mims	Sam Powers	1973
Victor Mohica	Felipe Ramirez	1980–81
Julia Montgomery	Tanya	2022
Philip Moon	Keemo Volien Abbott	1994–96
Natalie Morales	Talia Morgan	2022
Debbi Morgan	Harmony Hamilton	2011–12
Melissa Morgan	Brittany Norman	1988–90
Julianne Morris	Amy Wilson	1994–96, 2014
Phil Morris	Tyrone Jackson	1984–86
Karla Mosley	Amanda Sinclair	2021
Michael Muhney	Adam Newman	2009–14
Jack Murdock	Howard Morrison	1986
Rosemary Murphy	Lydia Callahan	1998
Jamia Simone Nash	Ana Hamilton	2008–09, 2011–12
Steve Nave	Todd	1978, 1986, 1988
Sandra Nelson	Phyllis Summers	1997–99
Robert Newman	Ashland Locke	2022
Lee Nicholl	Sven Peterson	1985–86
Nichelle Nichols	Lucinda Winters	2016
Stephen Nichols	Tucker McCall	2010–13
Nadine Nicole	Gwen Randall	2014–15
Shi Ne Nielson	Sheryl Gordon	2013
Michael Nouri	Elliott Hampton	2004
Morgan Obenreder	Crystal Porter	2017, 2022
Emily O'Brien	Jana Hawkes	2006–11
John O'Hurley	Jim Grainger	1989–90
Ken Olandt	Derek Stuart	1989
Rachel and Amanda Pace	Abby Newman	2003
Julia Pace Mitchell	Sofia Dupre	2010–12, 2019
Scott Palmer	Tim Sullivan	1983–89
Frank Parker	Unknown role	Unknown year
Peter Parros	Leo Baines	1986–87
Robert Parucha	Matt Miller	1985–87, 2003, 2020
Rick Pasqualone	Ken	2013
Craig Patton	Ray	1978
Patsy Pease	Patricia Fennell	1996
J. Eddie Peck	Cole Howard	1993–99, 2023–25
Nia Peeples	Karen Taylor	2007–09
Anthony Pena	Miguel Rodriguez	1984–2006
Millie Perkins	Rebecca Kaplan	2006
Sofia Pernas	Marisa Sierras	2015–17
Brock Peters	Frank Lewis	1982–85
Devon Pierce	Diane Westin	1990–91
Drew Pillsbury	David Kimble	1986
Julie Pinson	Shiloh	2004
Mark Pinter	Marcus Wheeler	2013
Eyal Podell	Adrian Korbel	2006–08
Marissa and Madison Poer	Kyle Abbott	2001–02
Sophie Pollono	Delia Abbott	2011–16, 2020
Daniel Polo	Jamie Vernon	2012–13
Peter Porte	Ricky Williams	2011–12
Brett Porter	Jack Abbott	1986
Monica Potter	Sharon Collins	1994
Ely Pouget	Laura Braun	2008–10
Nathan Purdee	Nathan Hastings	1984–92
Daniel Quinn	Ralph Hunnicutt	2002
Francesco Quinn	Tomas Del Cerro	1999–2001
Marisa Ramirez	Carmen Mesta	2006–07
Marisa Ramirez	Ines Vargas	2007
Logan Ramsey	Joseph Anthony	1984–85
Dax Randall	Moses Winters	2016, 2019
Margueritte Ray	Mamie Johnson	1980–90
Alex Rebar	Vince Holiday	1979–80, 1986–87
Quinn Redeker	Nicholas Reed	1979
Quinn Redeker	Joseph Thomas	1979–80
Quinn Redeker	Rex Sterling	1987–94, 2004
Blair Redford	Scott Grainger, Jr.	2005–06
Marianne Rees	Mai Volien	1994–96
Della Reese	Aunt Virginia	2009
Scott Reeves	Ryan McNeil	1991–2001
Madison and Morgan Reinherz	Abby Newman	2000–03
Donnelly Rhodes	Phillip Chancellor II	1974–75
David Richards	Sid Garber	1996–98, 2000
Caryn Richman	Lauren Fenmore	1991
Lynne Topping	Chris Brooks Foster	1978–82
Eden Riegel	Heather Stevens	2010–11
Jermaine Rivers	Damian Kane	2025
Michael Roark	Travis Crawford	2016
Eric Roberts	Vance Abrams	2010–11
McKenna Roberts	Matilda Ashby	2013–17
Deanna Robbins	Cindy Lake	1982–83
Alexia Robinson	Alex Perez	2000–02
Mo Rocca	Milton	2014, 2023
Tristan Rogers	Colin Atkinson	2010–12, 2014–17, 2019, 2025
Victoria Rowell	Drucilla Winters	1990–98, 2000, 2002–07
John Rubinstein	Charles Taylor	2009–10
Tim Russ	Judge Morrison	2011
David Lee Russek	Sean Bridges	2001–02
Deanna Russo	Logan Armstrong	2007
Jodean Russo	Regina Henderson	1975–76
William Russ	Tucker McCall	2009–10
Danielle Ryah	Chloe Mitchell	1994
Garrett Ryan	Kyle Abbott	2010–12
Marcy Rylan	Abby Newman	2010–13
David Sage	Reverend	1997
Erin Sanders	Eden Baldwin	2008
Tiffany Salerno	Alice Johnson	2000
Henry G. Sanders	Walter Barber	1990–91
Isabel Sanford	Sylvia	2002
Brytni Sarpy	Elena Dawson	2019–24
Lanna Saunders	Betty Andrews	1974–75
Lori Saunders	Cynthia Harris	1977
Hartley Sawyer	Kyle Abbott	2013–14
Rick Scarry	Minister	2009
David Schall	Reverend Davies	1998
Beth Scheffel	Barbara Ann Harding	1981–82
Kevin Schmidt	Noah Newman	2008–12
N.P. Schoch	Cole Howard	1980–81
Marnie Schulenburg	Alison Stewart	2007
Aaron Schwartz	Lucas	2022
Robin Scott	Amy Wilson	1994
Nick Scotti	Tony Viscardi	1996–99
Susan Seaforth Hayes	Joanna Manning	1984–89, 2005–07, 2010
Bill Sebastian	Stannis	2022
Tom Selleck	Jed Andrews	1974–75
Diego Serrano	Diego Guittierez	2001–02
Scott Seymour	Billy Abbott	2006
Paula Shaw	Judge Rebecca Harper	1989
Paula Shaw	Judge Anne Newton	1990, 1994
Shari Shattuck	Ashley Abbott	1996–99
John Shearin	Evan Sanderson	1986–87
Mary Sheldon	Nancy "Nan" Nolan	1989–90
Davetta Sherwood	Lily Winters	2006
Max Shippee	Graham Bloodworth	2017–18
Kin Shriner	Harrison Bartlett	2004
Kin Shriner	Jeffrey Bardwell	2011
Ruth Silvera	Shirley Haskell	1989–90
Marc Singer	Chet Delancy	1999
Randall L. Smith	Moses Winters	2014
Pamela Peters Solow	Peggy Brooks	1973–81, 1984
Dana Sparks	Lena Cavett	2021
Jon St. Elwood	Jazz Jackson	1983–86
Kristoff St. John	Neil Winters	1991–2019
Trevor St. John	Tucker McCall	2022–24
Rebecca Staab	April Stevens	2008
Reese and Kennedy Staib	Katie Newman	2014–16
Vincent Stalba	Carter	2025
Jack Stauffer	Scott Adams	1978–79
Chrishell Stause	Bethany Bryant	2016
Eric Steinberg	Ji Min Kim	2006–07
Brandin Stennis	Charlie Ashby	2016–17
Dawn Stern	Vanessa Lerner	2003–04
Lilibet Stern	Patty Williams	1980–83
Seth Stern	Kyle Abbott	2004
K. T. Stevens	Vanessa Prentiss	1976–81
Leslie Stevens	Rose Turner	2013
Paul Stevens	Bruce Henderson	1975–76
Trish Stewart	Chris Brooks Foster	1973–78, 1984
Caleb Stoddard	Derek Thurston	1976
Jonathan Stoddard	John Abbott	2018–19
Jim Storm	Neil Fenmore	1983–85
Rebecca Street	Jessica Blair Grainger	1988–89
Maxine Stuart	Margaret Dugan	1993, 1996
Connor and Garret Sullivan	Kyle Abbott	2001–02
Kelly Sullivan	Sage Newman	2014–16
Liam Sullivan	Joseph Lerner	1986
Elizabeth Sung	Luan Volien Abbott	1994–96
Don Swayze	Charlie Shaw	2010
Tammin Sursok	Colleen Carlton	2007–09
Mark Tapscott	Earl Bancroft	1982–83
Nicole Tarantini	Mackenzie Browning	2001
Graham Taylor	Jack Abbott	2017–18
Joseph Taylor	Tony DiSalvo	1982–83
Josh Taylor	Jed Sanders	1993–1994
Tammy Taylor	Patty Williams	1980
Christopher Templeton	Carol Evans	1983–93
Michelle Thomas	Callie Rogers	1998
Madison Thompson	Jordan	2020–21
Gordon Thomson	Patrick Baker	1997–98
Alexis Thorpe	Rianna Miner	2000–02
Terrell Tilford	Barton Shelby	2014–16
Zach Tinker	Fenmore Baldwin	2018–20, 2023
Jamie & Alister Tobias	Christian Newman	2015–19
Matthew Tobin	Dr. Cole	1986
Jeffrey Christopher Todd	Tobias Gray	2014–15
Russell Todd	Brad Carlton	1993
Tony Todd	Gus Rogan	2013
Gina Tognoni	Phyllis Summers	2014–19
David Tom	Billy Abbott	1999–2002, 2014
Heather Tom	Victoria Newman	1990–2003
Beth Toussaint	Hope Adams	2006
Brandi Tucker	Karen Becker	1976–78
Robbie Tucker	Fenmore Baldwin	2009–12
Peter Tuiasosopo	Koa	2011
David Tutera	Himself	2014
Michael Tylo	Blade Bladeson	1992–95
Michael Tylo	Rick Bladeson	1994–95
Jordi Vilasuso	Rey Rosales	2018–22
Joan Van Ark	Gloria Bardwell	2004–05
Granville Van Dusen	Keith Dennison	1997–2001
Vincent Van Patten	Christian Page	2000–01
Greg Vaughan	Diego Guittierez	2002–03
Miles Gaston Villanueva	Father Martin	2013
Miles Gaston Villanueva	Luca Santori	2015–16
Gregory Walcott	Ralph Olson	1975–77
Paul Walker	Brandon Collins	1992–93
Tommy Walker	Logan Kirkland	2026
George D. Wallace	Arthur Nicholls	1986
Marcia Wallace	Annie Wilkes	2009
Billy Warlock	Ben Hollander	2007–08
Myk Watford	Richard Womack	2013–14
Ben Watkins	Wesley Carter	2002–04
Cynthia Watros	Kelly Andrews	2013–14
Patty Weaver	Gina Roma	1982–2009, 2013, 2023, 2025
Jessica Nicole Webb	Alex Dettmer	2017
Nolan and Michael Webb	Connor Newman	2013–14
Bruce Weitz	Barry	2013
Dane West	Adam Newman	2020
Maura West	Diane Jenkins	2010–11
James Westmoreland	Decker	1982
Ellen Weston	Suzanne Lynch	1978–80
Darnell Williams	Sarge Wilder	2012–13
Redaric Williams	Tyler Michaelson	2012–14
Stephanie E. Williams	Amy Peters Lewis	1983–88, 1990
Tonya Lee Williams	Olivia Winters	1990–2005, 2007–12
Cassius Willis	Gil Wallace	2008–09
David Winn	Steven Williams	1980–81
William Wintersole	Mitchell Sherman	1986–96, 1998, 2003, 2008–09, 2011
Ray Wise	Ian Ward	2014–16, 2024–26
Janet Wood	April Stevens	1979
Lynn Wood	Alison Bancroft	1982–84
Lauren Woodland	Brittany Hodges	2000–05, 2018–21
Greg Wrangler	Steve Connelly	1992–96, 1999, 2001, 2009
Jona Xiao	Angie	2013
Patti Yasutake	Judge Wilkerson	2011
Jacob Young	Rick Forrester	2014
Sean Young	Meggie McClaine	2010–11
Colleen Zenk	Jordan Howard	2023–25
Yvonne Zima	Daisy Carter	2009–12
Darrell Zwerling	Judge Patrick Sullivan	1986

== See also ==
- List of The Young and the Restless cast members
