= List of The Young and the Restless characters =

This is a list of characters that appear (or have appeared) on the soap opera, The Young and the Restless.

== A ==
Character	Portrayer	Duration
Ashley Abbott	Eileen Davidson	1982–88, 1999–
Ashley Abbott	Brenda Epperson	1988–95
Ashley Abbott	Shari Shattuck	1996–99
Ashley Abbott	Julia D'Arcy Badinger	2018
Billy Abbott	Katrin and Margret Ingimarsdottir	1993
Billy Abbott	Brett Sherman	1993
Billy Abbott	Shane Silver	1993–95
Billy Abbott	Josh Michael Rose	1995–96
Billy Abbott	Scotty Leavenworth	1996–98
Billy Abbott	David Tom	1999–2002, 2014
Billy Abbott	Ryan Brown	2002–03
Billy Abbott	Scott Seymour	2006
Billy Abbott	Billy Miller	2008–14
Billy Abbott	Burgess Jenkins	2014–16
Billy Abbott	Jason Thompson	2016–
Delia Abbott	Riley, Olivia and Isabelle Jones	2009–10
Delia Abbott	Alix and Madeline Dubois	2010–11
Delia Abbott	Sophie Pollono	2011–16, 2020
Jack Abbott	Terry Lester	1980–89
Jack Abbott	Brett Porter	1986
Jack Abbott	Peter Bergman	1989–
Jack Abbott	Graham Taylor	2017–18
Jill Foster Abbott	Brenda Dickson	1973–80, 1983–87
Jill Foster Abbott	Bond Gideon	1980
Jill Foster Abbott	Deborah Adair	1980–83, 1986
Jill Foster Abbott	Melinda O. Fee	1984
Jill Foster Abbott	Jess Walton	1987–
Jill Foster Abbott	Judith Chapman	1994
Jill Foster Abbott	Lauren Koslow	2026
John Abbott	Sean Garrison	1980
John Abbott	Brett Halsey	1980–81
John Abbott	Jerry Douglas	1982–2013, 2015–16
John Abbott	Jason Thompson	2017
John Abbott	Jonathan Stoddard	2018–19
Keemo Volien Abbott	Philip Moon	1994–96
Kyle Abbott	Connor and Garret Sullivan	2001
Kyle Abbott	Marissa and Madison Poer	2002
Kyle Abbott	Cooper and Oliver Guynes	2002–03
Kyle Abbott	Seth Sturm	2004
Kyle Abbott	Garrett Ryan	2010–12
Kyle Abbott	Blake Hood	2012–13
Kyle Abbott	Hartley Sawyer	2013–14
Kyle Abbott	Lachlan Buchanan	2015–16
Kyle Abbott	Michael Mealor	2018–
Luan Volien Abbott	Elizabeth Sung	1994–96
Traci Abbott	Beth Maitland	1982–96, 1999, 2001–02, 2006–
Traci Abbott	Valentina Sky Gordon	2018
Vance Abrams	John Sloman	2010
Vance Abrams	Eric Roberts	2010–11
Hope Adams	Signy Coleman	1993–97, 2000, 2002, 2008, 2010, 2012
Hope Adams	Beth Toussaint	2006
Hope Adams	Maggie Gwin	2020
Scott Adams	Jack Stauffer	1978–79
Harry Aldridge	Tom Virtue	2009
Dan Ananda	Michael Harding	2010–11
Barbara Anderson	Deidre Hall	1973–75
Betty Andrews	Lanna Saunders	1974–75
Jed Andrews	Tom Selleck	1974–75, 2005
Kelly Andrews	Cynthia Watros	2013–14
Kelly Andrews	Cady McClain	2014–15
Lee Ann	Jillian Reeves	2009
Marco Annicelli	Peter Bergman	2015
Alana Anthony	Amy Gibson	1985
Joseph Anthony	Logan Ramsey	1984–85
Eric Appleton	Don Stewart	1998
Logan Armstrong	Deanna Russo	2007
Cane Ashby	Daniel Goddard	2007–19
Charlie Ashby	Parker Rose Curry	2010–12
Charlie Ashby	Aidan Clark	2013–16
Charlie Ashby	Brandin Stennis	2016–17
Charlie Ashby	Noah Alexander Gerry	2017–19
Mattie Ashby	Jordan Lemnah	2010–12
Mattie Ashby	McKenna Roberts	2013–17
Mattie Ashby	Lexie Stevenson	2017–19
Will Ashland	Ed McCready	1986
Chad Atherton	D. C. Douglas	1996–97
Caleb Atkinson	Daniel Goddard	2011
Colin Atkinson	Tristan Rogers	2010–12, 2014–17, 2019
Genevieve Atkinson	Genie Francis	2011–12
Boobsie Caswell Austin	Joy Garrett	1983–85
Douglas Austin	Michael Evans	1980–85, 1987–95

== B ==
Character	Portrayer	Duration
Marvia Bagano	Sumalee Montano	2007–08
Leo Baines	Nicholas Tierney	1984
Leo Baines	Derek Thompson	1985
Leo Baines	Peter Parros	1986–87
Leo Baines	Lou Beatty Jr.	1992
Patrick Baker	Gordon Thomson	1997–98
Tony Baker	Josh Albee	1979–80
Eden Baldwin	Erin Sanders	2008
Eden Baldwin	Vanessa Marano	2008–10
Eden Baldwin	Jessica Heap	2011–13
Fenmore Baldwin	Amiel and Avital Weiss	2006–07
Fenmore Baldwin	Riley and Matthew Esham	2007–08
Fenmore Baldwin	Aidan and Andrew Gonzales	2008–09
Fenmore Baldwin	Robbie Tucker	2009–12
Fenmore Baldwin	Max Ehrich	2012–15
Fenmore Baldwin	Zach Tinker	2018–20, 2023
Michael Baldwin	Christian LeBlanc	1991–93, 1997–
Lauren Fenmore Baldwin	Tracey E. Bregman	1983–95, 2000–
Lauren Fenmore Baldwin	Caryn Richman	1991
River Baldwin	Michael Gross	2008–09
Alison Bancroft	Lynn Wood	1982–84
Earl Bancroft	Mark Tapscott	1982–83
Kevin Bancroft	Christopher Holder	1982–84
Lillie Belle Barber	Norma Donaldson	1990–94
Lillie Belle Barber	Robin Braxton	1994
Walter Barber	Henry G. Sanders	1990–91
Walter Barber	Bennet Guillory	1992–94
Gloria Abbott Bardwell	Joan Van Ark	2004–05
Gloria Abbott Bardwell	Judith Chapman	2005–18, 2020–
Jeffrey Bardwell	Ted Shackelford	2007–15
Jeffrey Bardwell	Kin Shriner	2011
William Bardwell	Ted Shackelford	2006–07
Frank Barritt	Phil Dozois	1995, 1997, 2003–04
Harrison Bartlett	Kin Shriner	2004
Lynne Bassett	Laura Bryan Birn	1988–2005
Karen Becker	Brandi Tucker	1976–78
Nancy Becker	Cathy Carricaburu	1976–78
Ron Becker	Dick DeCoit	1976–78
Imani Benedict	Leigh-Anne Rose	2020–
Imani Benedict	Denise Boutte	2022
Chase Benson	Stephen Gregory	1988–91
Gabriel Bingham	Justin Hartley	2015
Blade Bladeson	Michael Tylo	1992–95
Rick Bladeson	Michael Tylo	1994–95
Christine "Cricket" Blair	Lauralee Bell	1983–2006, 2010–
Jessica Blair Grainger	Rebecca Street	1988–89
Joe Blair	John Denos	1983–87
Carter Bodi	Steve Vinovich	2006–07
Isabella Braña	Eva Longoria	2001–03
Isabella Braña	Uncredited	2012
Sean Bridges	Christopher Douglas	2001
Sean Bridges	David Lee Russek	2001–02
Christabel "Chris" Brooks	Trish Stewart	1973–78, 1984
Christabel "Chris" Brooks	Lynne Topping	1979–82
Jennifer Brooks	Dorothy Green	1973–77
Lauralee "Lorie" Brooks	Jaime Lyn Bauer	1973–82, 1984, 2002, 2018
Leslie Brooks	Janice Lynde	1973–77, 2018, 2021
Leslie Brooks	Victoria Mallory	1977–84
Peggy Brooks	Pamela Peters Solow	1973–81, 1984
Stuart Brooks	Robert Colbert	1973–83
Amanda Browning	Denice Duff	2001–02
Mackenzie Browning	Ashley Bashioum	1999–2002, 2004–05
Mackenzie Browning	Nicole Tarantini	2001
Mackenzie Browning	Kelly Kruger	2002–03, 2018–19
Mackenzie Browning	Rachel Kimsey	2005–06
Mackenzie Browning	Clementine Ford	2009–10
Bethany Bryant	Chrishell Hartley	2016
Simone Burch	Shanica Knowles	2018
Felix Burke	Booth Colman	1986–2000

== C ==
Character	Actor/Actress	Duration
Ramona Caceres	Gladys Jimenez	1999–2000, 2002
Ryder Callahan	Wilson Bethel	2009–11
Gloria Capshaw	Rae Norman	1994
Alan Carey	Don Chastain	2000
Brad Carlton	Don Diamont	1985–96, 1998–2009
Brad Carlton	Russell Todd	1993
Colleen Carlton	Ashley, Kelly and Bobby Brown	1992
Colleen Carlton	Caitlin Taylor and Jessica Jaymes Miley	1993
Colleen Carlton	Natalie and Victoria McCormick	1993–94
Colleen Carlton	Alanna Masterson	1994–95
Colleen Carlton	Lyndsy Fonseca	2001–05
Colleen Carlton	Adrianne Leon	2006–07
Colleen Carlton	Tammin Sursok	2007–09
Colleen Carlton	Uncredited	2010
Daisy Carter	Yvonne Zima	2009–12
Molly Carter	Marilyn Alex	1991–93, 1995
Sheila Carter	Kimberlin Brown	1990–95, 2005–06
Sheila Carter	Michelle Stafford	2006–07
Wesley Carter	Ben Watkins	2002–04
Jerry "Cash" Cashman	John Gibson	1980–82
Chance Chancellor	Andrew Clark Rogers	1988
Chance Chancellor	Chuckie and Kenny Gravino	1988–89
Chance Chancellor	Scott and Shaun Markley	1991–93
Chance Chancellor	Courtland Mead	1993–95
Chance Chancellor	Alex D. Linz	1995–96
Chance Chancellor	Nicholas Pappone	1996–99
Chance Chancellor	Penn Badgley	2000–01
Chance Chancellor	John Driscoll	2009–11
Chance Chancellor	Donny Boaz	2019–21
Chance Chancellor	Justin Gaston	2020
Chance Chancellor	Conner Floyd	2021–
Katherine Chancellor	Jeanne Cooper	1973–2013
Katherine Chancellor	Beverly Garland	1981
Katherine Chancellor	Gisele MacKenzie	1986
Katherine Chancellor	Michael Learned	2011
Phillip Chancellor II	John Considine	1973–74
Phillip Chancellor II	Donnelly Rhodes	1974–75
Phillip Chancellor III	Dick Billingsley	1978–81
Phillip Chancellor III	Chris Hebert	1981–82
Phillip Chancellor III	Jimmy Keegan	1983
Phillip Chancellor III	Thom Bierdz	1986–89, 2004, 2009–11
Audra Charles	Zuleyka Silver	2022–
Carol Chen	Lisa Lord	2001
Judge Robert Chong	Keone Young	2007
David Chow	Vincent Irizarry	2007–08
Avery Bailey Clark	Jessica Collins	2011–15
Joe Clark	Scott Elrod	2014–15
Matt Clark (a.k.a. Carter Mills)	Eddie Cibrian	1994–96
Matt Clark (a.k.a. Carter Mills)	Russell Lawrence	2000
Matt Clark (a.k.a. Carter Mills)	Rick Hearst	2000–01
Ron Clark	Dennis Haysbert	1986
Brandon Collins	Paul Walker	1992–93
Doris Collins	Victoria Ann Lewis	1994
Doris Collins	Karen Hensel	1994–2003, 2005, 2008–09, 2011–12
Ruby Collins	Veleka Gray Walker	1983
Steve Connelly	Greg Wrangler	1992–96, 2001, 2009
Farren Connor	Colleen Casey	1985–87
Helen Copeland	Karina Logue	2013
Mariah Copeland	Camryn Grimes	2014–
Sabrina Costelana	Raya Meddine	2008–10
Kurt Costner	Leigh McCloskey	1996–97, 2013
Marge Cotrooke	Jeanne Cooper	1989–90, 2008–09
Michael Crawford	Colby Chester	1985–90
Sebastian Crown	Edgar Daniels	2000
George Curtis	Anthony Geary	1973
Harry Curtis	Gary Collins	2000
Hilary Curtis	Mishael Morgan	2013–19
Jack Curtis	Anthony Herrera	1975–77
Joann Curtis	Kay Heberle	1975–78
Russ Curtis	Christopher Curry	2010

== D ==
Character	Actor/Actress	Duration
Roy Daley	James Avery	2012
Patrick Dalton	Bronson Pinchot	2008
Melanie Daniels	Erin Chambers	2013
Rick Daros	Randy Holland	1983–84
Trina Davidson	Michelle Sorri	2000–01
Brent Davis	Jim McMullan	1984
Brent Davis	Bert Kramer	1984–85
Gary Dawson	Ricky Paull Goldin	1999–2000
Mae Dawson	Lynn Hamilton	1997
Tomas Del Cerro	Francesco Quinn	1999–2001
Chet Delancy	Marc Singer	1999
Rafael Delgado	Carlos Bernard	1999
Keith Dennison	Granville Van Dusen	1996–2001
Keith Dennison	David Allen Brooks	1999
Megan Dennison	Ashley Jones	1997–2001
Tricia Dennison	Sabryn Genet	1997–2001
Gene Desmond	Christopher Allport	2000
Shirley Desmond	Beverly Archer	1999
Alex Dettmer	Jessica Nicole Webb	2017
Primrose DeVille	Ellen Greene	2011
Rose DeVille	Darlene Conley	1979–80, 1986–87
Oliver Dillion	Rob Brownstein	2008
Tony DiSalvo	Joseph Taylor	1982–83
Cody Dixon	Brody Hutzler	1999–2004
Kieran Donnelly	Daniel Romer	2012–13
Rick Dooley	Michael Burkhardt	1991
Richard Douglas	Ryan T. Husk	2012
Evan Drake	James McCauley	2009
Farrah Dubose	Erika Jayne	2016–18
Margaret Dugan	Maxine Stuart	1993, 1996
Miles Dugan	Parley Baer	1993–96
Sofia Dupre	Julia Pace Mitchell	2010–12

== E ==
Character	Actor/Actress	Duration
Frank Eames	Ryan Alosio	2005
Eddy	Michael Santiago	1984–85
Mario Edmonds	Neal Matarazzo	1998–99
Walter Edmonson	William Boyett	1986
Brad Elliot	Tom Hallick	1973–78
Charles Elliott	Brad Blaisdell	1994
Frank Ellis	Larry Bagby	2008–09
Frank Ellis	Kanin Howell	2010
Dennis Ellroy	Carmen Argenziano	2008–09
Peter Endicut	Terence Ford	1986
Carol Robbins Evans	Christopher Templeton	1983–93
Skip Evans	Todd Curtis	1987–93
Skylar Carol Evans	Melissa and Rebecca Bruseth	1989–90
Skylar Carol Evans	Mallory Brooks	1990

== F ==
Character	Portrayer	Duration
Francis Fallon	James Harper	1994
Anne Fatone	Fanshen Cox	2011
Maestro Ernesto Fautsch	Karl Bruck	1974–82, 1984–85
Al Felton	Vasili Bogazianos	1998–99
Neil Fenmore	James Storm	1983–85
Curtis Fielding	Bradley Snedeker	2016
Addison Fields	Evan MacKenzie	2000
Kevin Fisher	Greg Rikaart	2003–
Tom Fisher	Jonathan Fraser	2004
Tom Fisher	Roscoe Born	2005–06, 2009
Rosa Flinn	Ivonne Coll	2008
Nellie Flint	Lois Auer	1986
Brian Forbes	Jay Kerr	1982–83
Michael Forester	Paul Savage	2002, 2005–06
Felicia Forrester	Lesli Kay	2008
Eric Forrester	John McCook	1993, 1995–96, 2005, 2008, 2013, 2017, 2021
Rick Forrester	Jacob Young	2014
Stephanie Forrester	Susan Flannery	1993
Liz Foster	Julianna McCarthy	1973–86, 1993, 2003–04, 2008, 2010
Greg Foster	James Houghton	1973—76, 2003
Greg Foster	Brian Kerwin	1976–77
Greg Foster	Wings Hauser	1977–81, 2010
Greg Foster	Howard McGillin	1981–82
Snapper Foster	William Gray Espy	1973–75, 2003
Snapper Foster	David Hasselhoff	1975–82, 2010
William "Bill" Foster, Sr.	Charles H. Gray	1975–76
Sarah Fox	Danette Wilson	2016
Suzanne Fuller	Kelly Coffield Park	2019
Flo Fulton	Katrina Bowden	2021
Roger Furney	C. Lindsay Workman	1992

== G ==
Character	Portrayer	Duration
Eddie G.	Blake Gibbons	2012
Richard Gallagher	Tim Misuradze	1997
Sid Garber	David Richards	1996–98, 2000
Eric Garrison	Brian Matthews	1983–85
Peter Garrett	Justin Gorence	1995–98
Shawn Garrett	Tom McConnell	1984
Shawn Garrett	Grant Cramer	1984–86
Joani Garza	Marita De Leon	1995–98
Meredith Gates	Alicia Coppola	2016
Russel Gates	David Grant Wright	2016
Stephanie Gayle	Anne Leighton	2013
Martin Gentry	Paul Carr	1986
Andrew Gibson	Will Schaub	2006
Sam Gibson	Sean Patrick Flanery	2011
Rory Gleason	Krizia Bajos	2009
Sheryl Gordon	Shi Ne Nielson	2013
Sydney Gorman	Renee Ridgeley	2002
Claire Grace	Hayley Erin	2023-
James "Jim" Grainger	John Phillip Law	1989
James "Jim" Grainger	John O'Hurley	1989–90
Scott Grainger, Jr.	Jessica and Hannah Gist	1991–93
Scott Grainger, Jr.	Joseph David Tello	1993–94
Scott Grainger, Jr.	Gemini Barnett	1994
Scott Grainger, Jr.	Blair Redford	2005–06
Scott Grainger, Jr.	Daniel Hall	2017–18
Scott Grainger, Sr.	Peter Barton	1988–93
Tobias Gray	Jeffrey Christopher Todd	2014–15
Kent Grazier	Jonas Fisch	2010–11
Howard Green	David Faustino	2016–
Sasha Green	Tina Arning	1995–97, 2002
Beth Greene	Laura Niemi	2015
Nolan Grimes	Vince Corazza	2009
Diego Guittierez	Diego Serrano	2001–02
Diego Guittierez	Greg Vaughan	2002–03
Raul Guittierez	David Lago	1999–2004, 2009, 2018
Jerry Gunderson	Will McMillan	2004

== H ==
Character	Portrayer	Duration
Ana Hamilton	Jamia Simone Nash	2008–09, 2011–12
Ana Hamilton	Loren Lott	2018–19
Brian Hamilton	Steven Culp	1995
Brian Hamilton	William A. Wallace	1997, 2002
Devon Hamilton	Bryton James	2004–
Tyra Hamilton	Eva Marcille	2008–09
Yolanda "Harmony" Hamilton	Chene Lawson	2005–06, 2023
Yolanda "Harmony" Hamilton	Debbi Morgan	2011–12
Elliot Hampton	Michael Nouri	2004
Barbara Ann Harding	Beth Scheffel	1981–82
John Harding	Robert Ackerman	1981
John Harding	Lee Debroux	1981
Detective Mark Harding	Chris McKenna	2014–15
Rebecca Harper	Kelly Garrison	1990
Cynthia Harris	Lori Saunders	1977
Cynthia Harris	Heather Lowe	1977–78
Robert Haskell	Ryan MacDonald	1989–90
Shirley Haskell	Ruth Silveira	1989–90
Nate Hastings	Shantel and Shenice Buford	1992–95
Nate Hastings	Christopher Pope	1995
Nate Hastings	Malcolm Hunter	1995–96
Nate Hastings	Bryant Jones	1996–2002
Nate Hastings	Walter Fauntleroy	2011
Nate Hastings	Brooks Darnell	2018–19
Nate Hastings	Sean Dominic	2019–
Nathan Hastings	Nathan Purdee	1984–92
Nathan Hastings	Randy Brooks	1992–94
Nathan Hastings	Adam Lazarre-White	1994–96
Pamela Hathaway	Toni M. Youngblood	2014
Glen Hauserman	Charles Carroll	1997
Jana Hawkes	Emily O'Brien	2006–11
Marvin Hawkins	Gary McGurk	1986
Michelle Hazelton	Kelly Fryr	2016
J. T. Hellstrom	Thad Luckinbill	1999–2010, 2017–19, 2023
Reed Hellstrom	Asher and Cole	2007–08
Reed Hellstrom	Quin and Reed Baron	2008–09
Reed Hellstrom	Max Page	2009–16
Reed Hellstrom	Tristan Lake Leabu	2016–20
Juliet Helton	Laur Allen	2017
Bruce Henderson	Robert Clarke	1973-74
Bruce Henderson	Paul Stevens	1974–75
Mark Henderson	Steve Carlson	1974–76
Regina Henderson	Jodean Russo	1975
Arthur Hendricks	David Hedison	2004
Richard Hightower	Jay Huguely	2010
Sally Hightower	Elizabeth Roberts	2010
Greg Hillman	Robert Clotworthy	1995–97
Benjamin Hochman	Ben Hermes	2017
Anita Hodges	Mitzi Kapture	2002–05
Brittany Hodges	Vanessa Lee Evigan	1999–2000
Brittany Hodges	Lauren Woodland	2000–05, 2018–21
Frederick Hodges	John H. Martin	2002–05
Mark Hogan	Mike Badalucco	2010
Vince Holiday	Alex Rebar	1979–80, 1986–87
Ben Hollander	Billy Warlock	2007–08
Beth Hortense	Brett Butler	2012
Cole Howard	N.P. Schoch	1980–81
Cole Howard	J. Eddie Peck	1993–99, 2023–
Eve Howard	Margaret Mason	1980–84, 1993
Jordan Howard	Colleen Zenk	2023–
Jason Hoyt	Michael Medico	2002
Ralph Hunnicutt	Angelo Tiffe	2001–02
Ralph Hunnicutt	Daniel Quinn	2002
Adrian Hunter	Mark Derwin	1989–90
Bunny Hutchinson	Shell Danielson	2001

== I ==
Character	Portrayer	Duration
Judith Isabel	Kerrie Keane	2008–10

== J ==
Character	Portrayer	Duration
Rob Jace	Lee Spencer	1997, 1999, 2001
Jazz Jackson	Jon St. Elwood	1983–86
Tyrone Jackson	Phil Morris	1984–86
Don Jacob	Brian Patrick Clarke	2000
Lynn Jacobs	Boti Bliss	2010
Samir Jain	Ravi Kapoor	2015
Carrie James	Julie Basem	2009
Donald James	David Hall	1986
Diane Jenkins	Alex Donnelley	1982–84, 1986, 1996–2001
Diane Jenkins	Susan Walters	2001–04, 2010, 2022–
Diane Jenkins	Maura West	2010–11
Judge Russell Jennings	Robert Clotworthy	1998–2006
Alice Johnson	Tamara Clatterbuck	1998–2000, 2003, 2005, 2017
Alice Johnson	Tiffany Salerno	2000
Kerry Johnson	Alice Hunter	2018–19
Mamie Johnson	Marguerite Ray	1982–90
Mamie Johnson	Veronica Redd	1990–95, 1999–2004, 2023
Millie Johnson	Ernestine Mercer	1997–2000
Justin Jones	Ron Fassler	2000
Trent Jordan	Beau Billingslea	1995
Blake Joseph	Paul Leyden	2010–11
Keith Joyner	David Joyner	2008

== K ==
Character	Portrayer	Duration
Hannah Kang	Karen Lew	2006–07
Rebecca Kaplan	Millie Perkins	2006
Rebecca Kaplan	Lorna Raver	2006–07
Candace Katsumoto	Emily Kuroda	1998
Terrence Kelley	Gary Sandy	2011
Naheim Kennedy	Omari'yon Harris	2017
Alan Kester	David Orr	1990–92
Ji Min Kim	Eric Steinberg	2006–07
David Kimble	Drew Pillsbury	1986
David Kimble	Michael Corbett	1986–91
Mimi King	McCready Baker	2008
Rob King	Christopher Rob Bowen	2014
Tony Kingston	Michael Mansini	2018
Stan Kinsey	Alan Fudge	1999
Randall Kirby	Tom Fuccello	1992
Cameron Kirsten	Linden Ashby	2003–04, 2023
Stan Kline	Alec Holland	2000
Adrian Korbel	Eyal Podell	2006–08
Marnie Kowalski	Tara Lipinski	1999
Cynthia Kwan	Pape Leong	2007

== L ==
Character	Portrayer	Duration
Joe Lacerra	Stephen Liska	1998–2005
Cindy Lake	DeAnna Robbins	1982–83
James Lake	Glenn Corbett	1983
Mary Margaret Lake	Fawne Harriman	1983
Sammy Lake	Danny McCoy Jr.	1978
Hilary Lancaster	Kelly Garrison	1991–93
Joshua Landers	Heath Kizzier	1996–98
Veronica Landers	Tracy Lindsey Melchior	1996–97
Veronica Landers	Candice Daly	1997–98
Fred Lansing	Eldon Quick	1987
Helen Lansing	Susan Quick	1986
Larry Larkin	Gary Giem	1978
Linda Larkin	Susan Walden	1978
Wesley Larkin	Mitchell Edmonds	1988–89
Steven Lassiter	Rod Arrants	1987–88
Robert Laurence	Peter Brown	1981–82, 1990
Angela Lawrence	Elizabeth Keifer	1982–83
Anita Lawson	Catherine Bach	2012–19
Chelsea Lawson	Melissa Claire Egan	2011–
Chantal Lebasque	Chantal Abbey	2000–02
Jerry Lee	Charles Chun	1996
Ross Leigh	Dave Roberts	1999
Bob Lemon	Mitch Gibney	2011–12
Joseph Lerner	Liam Sullivan	1986
Vanessa Lerner	Dawn Stern	2003–04
Amy Lewis	Stephanie E. Williams	1983–88, 1990
Frank Lewis	Brock Peters	1982–85
Emerson Lintz	Jonathan Emerson	2013
Ashland Locke	Richard Burgi	2021–22
Ashland Locke	Robert Newman	2022
Harrison Locke (a.k.a. Harrison Abbott)	Kellen Enriquez	2021–24
Harrison Locke (a.k.a. Harrison Abbott)	Redding Munsell	2024–
Tara Locke	Elizabeth Leiner	2021
Skye Lockhart	Laura Stone	2008, 2010
Brooke Logan	Katherine Kelly Lang	1998, 2007
Amy Long	Calleigh Scott	2010
Granton "Grant" Long	Tom Whyte	1996
Benita Lopez	Sandra Teres	1996–97
Leanna Love	Barbara Crampton	1987–93, 1998–2002, 2006–07, 2023
Kara Ludwig	Sandra Hess	2006
Robert Lynch	Terrence McNally	1993–94
Suzanne Lynch	Ellen Weston	1978–80
Andrew Lynford	Cody Ryan McLaughlin	2018

== M ==
Character	Portrayer	Duration
Carson MacDonald	Marsh Mokhtari	2007
Sherm Madisen	Jack Stauffer	1987
David Mallory	Robert Gibson	1976–78
Ronan Malloy	Jeff Branson	2010–12
Joanna Manning	Susan Seaforth Hayes	1984–89, 2005–07, 2010
Lisa Mansfield	Lynne Harbaugh	1988–89
Adrienne Markham	Lisa Canning	2004–05
Jared Markson	Linwood Dalton	1984–85
Bobby Marsino	John Enos III	2003–05
Mari Jo Mason	Pamela Bach	1994
Mari Jo Mason	Diana Barton	1994–96
Dylan McAvoy	Steve Burton	2013–17
Terry McAvoy	Steve Gagnon	2013
Tucker McCall	William Russ	2009–10
Tucker McCall	Stephen Nichols	2010–13
Tucker McCall	Trevor St. John	2022–
Edna McCallister	Miriam Flynn	2007
Frank McCallister	Don Stark	2007
Meggie McClain	Sean Young	2010–11
Sally McGuire	Lee Crawford	1973–74, 1981–82
Ryan McNeil	Scott Reeves	1991–2001
Detective Sid Meeks	Kevin McCorkle	2009–11
Dina Abbott Mergeron	Marla Adams	1983–86, 1991, 1996, 2008, 2017–20
Dina Abbott Mergeron	Cathy Marks	2018
Marc Mergeron	Frank M. Bernard	1984, 1987–88
Carmen Mesta	Marisa Ramirez	2006–07
Leslie Michaelson	Angell Conwell	2010–17, 2019
Tyler Michaelson	Redaric Williams	2012–14
Albert Miller	George Kennedy	2003, 2010
Cora Miller	Dorothy McGuire	1984
Cora Miller	Carrie Anne James	2010
Matt Miller	Robert Parucha	1985–87, 2003, 2020
Matt Miller	Richard Gleason	2018
Edith Mills	Jeanne Bates	1981
Rianna Miner	Rianna Loving	1999–2000
Rianna Miner	Alexis Thorpe	2000–02
Chloe Mitchell (a.k.a. Kate Valentine)	Darla and Sandra Greer	1990–91
Chloe Mitchell (a.k.a. Kate Valentine)	Danielle Ryah	1994
Chloe Mitchell (a.k.a. Kate Valentine)	Elizabeth Hendrickson	2008–17, 2019–
Keesha Monroe	Wanda Acuna; Jennifer Gatti	1995; 1995–96
Amber Moore	Adrienne Frantz	2006–10, 2013
Tawny Moore	Andrea Evans	2010
Alec Moretti	Andre Khabbazi	1997–98
Seth Morgan	Brian Gaskill	2024
Elise Moxley	Jensen Buchanan	2015–16
Estella Munoz	Anne Betancourt	2008–09
Patrick Murphy	Michael Fairman	2008–2014, 2017

== N ==
Character	Portrayer	Duration
Abjhit Nair	Jay Harik	2006
Roy Namaguchi	James Saito	1986
Robert Napolitano	Tony Colitti	2004
Cynthia Nash	Debra Sullivan	2009
Wayne Navalle	Clayton Day	1986
Brett Nelson	Greg Lauren	1998–99
Simon Neville	Michael E. Knight	2015–16
Abby Newman	Morgan and Madison Reinherz	2000–03
Abby Newman	Rachel and Amanda Pace	2003
Abby Newman	Darcy Rose Byrnes	2003–08
Abby Newman	Hayley Erin	2008–10
Abby Newman	Marcy Rylan	2010–13
Abby Newman	Melissa Ordway	2013–
Adam Newman	Celeste and Coryn Williams	1995
Adam Newman	Danielle and Sabrina Hepler	1995
Adam Newman	Spencer Klass	1995–96
Adam Newman	Hayden Tank	1996–97, 2002
Adam Newman	Chris Engen	2008–09
Adam Newman	Michael Muhney	2009–14
Adam Newman	Justin Hartley	2014–16
Adam Newman	Mark Grossman	2019–
Adam Newman	Dane West	2020
Cassie Newman	Camryn Grimes	1997–2007, 2009–10, 2013–14, 2020–21
Connor Newman	Brady and Cooper Friedman	2013
Connor Newman	Nolan and Michael Webb	2013–14
Connor Newman	Owen and Henry Leark	2014–15
Connor Newman	Asher and Brayden McDonell	2015
Connor Newman	Gunner and Ryder Gadbois	2015–18
Connor Newman	Judah Mackey	2019–
Faith Newman	Lutsky Twins	2009–11
Faith Newman	Madison & Brynn Bowie	2011
Faith Newman	Alyvia Alyn Lind	2011–21
Faith Newman	Mckenna Grace	2013–15
Faith Newman	Reylynn Caster	2021–
Julia Newman	Meg Bennett	1980–84, 1986–87, 2002, 2018, 2020
Nicholas Newman	Marco and Stefan Flores	1989
Nicholas Newman	Griffin Ledner	1990–91
Nicholas Newman	John Nelson-Alden	1991–94
Nicholas Newman	Joshua Morrow	1994–
Nicholas Newman	Thad Luckinbill	2018
Nikki Newman	Erica Hope	1978–79
Nikki Newman	Melody Thomas Scott	1979–
Nikki Newman	Robin Eisenman	1984
Noah Newman	Samantha and Zachary Elkins	1997
Noah Newman	Lauren Summer Harvey	1997
Noah Newman	Hunter Preisendorfer	1997–2000
Noah Newman	C.J. Hunter	1998–99
Noah Newman	Nicholas Graziano	1999
Noah Newman	Blake Michael Bryan	2000–01
Noah Newman	McKay Giller	2001–04
Noah Newman	Blake Woodruff	2004—05
Noah Newman	Chase Ellison	2005
Noah Newman	Hunter Allan	2005–08
Noah Newman	Kevin Schmidt	2008–12
Noah Newman	Luke Kleintank	2010–11
Noah Newman	Robert Adamson	2012–18, 2020
Noah Newman	Rory Gibson	2021–2023
Noah Newman	Lucas Adams	2025–
Sharon Newman	Monica Potter	1994
Sharon Newman	Heidi Mark	1994
Sharon Newman	Sharon Case	1994–
Summer Newman	Elara and Rhea Kerwin	2006–08
Summer Newman	Bianca and Chiara D'Ambrosio	2008
Summer Newman	Sophia and Angelina Hert	2008–09
Summer Newman	Samantha Bailey	2009–12
Summer Newman	Lindsay Bushman	2012
Summer Newman	Hunter King	2012–16, 2018–22
Summer Newman	Bayley Corman	2018
Summer Newman	Allison Lanier	2022–2025
Victor Newman	Eric Braeden	1980–
Victoria Newman	Ashley Nicole Millan	1982–90
Victoria Newman	Heather Tom	1990–2003
Victoria Newman	Sarah Aldrich	1997
Victoria Newman	Amelia Heinle	2005–
Evelyn Newsome	Peggy Dunne	2008
Anne Newton	Paula Shaw	1990
Allie Nguyen	Kelsey Wang	2022–2023
Arthur Nicholls	George D. Wallace	1986
George Nicols	Paul Palmero	1993
Alan Noah	John DeMita	1990
Alan Noah	Greg Allan Martin	1990–92
Claudia Noels	Karla Droege	2011
Nancy "Nan" Nolan	Mary Sheldon	1989–90
Brittany Norman	Melissa Morgan	1988–90
Audrey North	Constance Towers	1996
Josh North	Zach Luna	1994
Tom Norwood	Ron Daly	2000
Holden Novak	Nathan Owens	2025-
Vicki Novell	Jamie Tompkins	2016

== O ==
Character	Portrayer	Duration
Mickey O'Brien	Bill Ferrell	1998–2005
Angel Ochoa	Frank Runyeon	2015
Charlie Ockwell	Christopher Kriesa	1998–99
Dennis Okamura	Clyde Kusatsu	2006–12
Karen Olsen	Judyann Elder	1986
Ralph Olson	Gregory Walcott	1975–77
Doug Overman	Timothy Guest	1995
Evan Owen	Chris Potter	2007

== P ==
Character	Portrayer	Duration
Frank Pacelli	Scott Beenner	2000
Christian Page	Vincent Van Patten	2000
Walter Palin	Scott Hoxby	2008
Phil Parker	Frank Marth	1986
Oscar Paulsen	Carl Gillard	2004
Jed Paulson	Joseph C. Phillips	2008
Jeff Pearson	Kevin Light	1997
Marisol Pena	Elena Lyons	2008–09
Alex Perez	Alexia Robinson	2000–02
Ruth Perkins	Leslie Bevis	1998–99
Emily Peterson	Stacy Haiduk	2009–12
Gwen Peterson	Erica Shaffer	2004–05
Jamie Peterson	Jamie Elman	2010
Norman Peterson	Mark Haining	1994
Sven Peterson	Lee Nicholl	1985–86
Stevenson Petrie	Christopher Pennock	1986
Alvin Peysers	Danny Breen	1986
Mike Phillips	Jeremy Denzlinger	2011
J. Pinner	Timothy Dale Agee	1999–2000
Owen Pomerantz	Albie Selznick	2009–10
Damon Porter	Keith Hamilton Cobb	2003–05
Ralph Porter	Burt Saunders	1990
Tessa Porter	Cait Fairbanks	2017–
Sam Powers	William Mims	1973
Sam Powers	Barry Cahill	1974–75
Lance Prentiss	John McCook	1976–80
Lance Prentiss	Dennis Cole	1981–82
Lucas Prentiss	Tom Ligon	1977–82
Vanessa Prentiss	K. T. Stevens	1976–81
Mitch Pullman	Lamont Thompson	2016

== Q ==
Character	Actor	Duration
Penelope Quinlan	Carolyn Hennesy	2002

== R ==
Character	Portrayer	Duration
Clint Radison	Sal Landi	1988–89
Clint Radison	James Michael Gregary	1989–91, 2009
Felipe Ramirez	Victor Mohica	1980–81
Charlotte Ramsey	Elizabeth Harrower	2003
Emma Randall	Alice Greczyn	2015
Gwen Randall	Nadine Nicole	2014–15
Cassandra Rawlins	Nina Arvesen	1988–91
George Rawlins	Jonathan Farwell	1988–89
Ben "Stitch" Rayburn	Sean Carrigan	2013–17, 2021
Jenna Rayburn	Stephanie Lemelin	2014
Max Rayburn	Jared Breeze	2016
Sharon Reaves	Veleka Gray	1983–84
Casey Reed	Roberta Leighton	1978–81, 1984–89, 1998
Nicholas "Nick" Reed	Quinn Redeker	1979
Nicholas "Nick" Reed	Scott Anthony Lett	2004
Marion Reeves	Carolyn Conwell	1977
Timothy Reid	Aaron Lustig	1996–97, 2002, 2012
Brock Reynolds	Beau Kazer	1974–80, 1984–86, 1990–92, 1999–2004, 2008–11, 2013
Andrew Rhyne	David Franklin	2007
Andy Richards	Steven Ford	1981–87, 2002–03
Glenn Richards	Brendan Burns	1989, 1991–93, 1995–97, 1999, 2001, 2003–06
Santos Rio	Rudy Dobrev	2008
Graham Roberts	Armin Shimerman	2007
Miguel Rodriguez	Anthony Peńa	1984–2006
Gus Rogan	Tony Todd	2013
Callie Rogers	Michelle Thomas	1998
Callie Rogers	Siena Goines	1998–2000
Gina Roma	Patty Weaver	1982–2009, 2013
Daniel Romalotti	Hannah and Desiree Wheelan	1994–96
Daniel Romalotti	Michael McElroy	1996–97
Daniel Romalotti	Chase MacKenzie Bebak	1997–98
Daniel Romalotti	Roland Gibbons	1998
Daniel Romalotti	Cam Gigandet	2004
Daniel Romalotti	Michael Graziadei	2004–13, 2016, 2022–
Danny Romalotti	Michael Damian	1980–98, 2002–04, 2008, 2012–13, 2022–
Arturo Rosales	Jason Canela	2018–20
Celeste Rosales	Eva LaRue	2019–20
Lola Rosales	Sasha Calle	2018–21
Mia Rosales	Noemi Gonzalez	2018–19
Rey Rosales	Jordi Vilasuso	2018–22
Connie Ross	Jill Larson	2014
Jeremy Ross	James Ivy	1997
Marianne Roulland	Lilyan Chauvin	1974
Pierre Roulland	Robert Clary	1973–74
Roxanne	Tatyana Ali	2007–13
Keith Rudman	Robert Benedict	1989
Peter Ryan	Rueben Grundy; Bill Billions	2007–08; 2008

== S ==
Character	Portrayer	Duration
Harvey Sakin	James Sloyan	2000
Jed Sanders	Josh Taylor	1993–94
Evan Sanderson	John Shearin	1986–87
Luca Santori	Miles Gaston Villanueva	2015–16
Michael Scott	Nicholas Benedict	1980–81
Ravi Shapur	Abhi Sinha	2016–
Deacon Sharpe	Sean Kanan	2009–12, 2022
Charlie Shaw	Don Swayze	2010
Barton Shelby	Terrell Tilford	2014–16
Gwen Sherman	Jennifer Leak	1973–75
Mitchell Sherman	Fred Beir	1975–76
Mitchell Sherman	William Wintersole	1977–82, 1986–96, 1998, 2003, 2008–09, 2011
Craig Shields	Kristian Kordula	2017
Marisa Sierras	Sofia Pernas	2015–17
John Silva	John Castellanos	1989–2004
Stephanie Simmons	Vivica A. Fox	1994–95
Stephanie Simmons	Angelle Brooks	1996
Eric Singer	John Rubinow	1991
Amanda Sinclair	Mishael Morgan	2019–
Amanda Sinclair	Karla Mosley	2021
Courtney Sloane	Kelli Goss	2013–15
Jesse Smith	Max Adler	2017
Sarah Smythe	Tracey E. Bregman	2010
Natalie Soderberg	Mara McCaffray	2016
Sally Spectra	Courtney Hope	2020–
Shirley Spectra	Patrika Darbo	2021
Bill Spencer Jr.	Don Diamont	2021
Caroline Spencer	Linsey Godfrey	2014
Wyatt Spencer	Darin Brooks	2021
Jeremy Stark	James Hyde	2022–23
Rex Sterling	Quinn Redeker	1987–94, 2004
April Stevens	Patricia Albrecht	1979
April Stevens	Janet Wood	1980
April Stevens	Cynthia Eilbacher	1980–82, 1992–94
April Stevens	Rebecca Staab	2008
Dorothy Stevens	Melinda Cordell	1980–82, 1993
Heather Stevens	Dana and Lauren Schankman	1979
Heather Stevens	Claire and Elizabeth Schoene	1979–82
Heather Stevens	Conci Nelson	1993–94
Heather Stevens	Vail Bloom	2007–10, 2023–24
Heather Stevens	Eden Riegel	2010–11
Heather Stevens	Jennifer Landon	2012
Wayne Stevens	William Long, Jr.	1980–82
Zack Stinnet	Ryan Ashton	2017
Adriana Stone	Johanna Flores	2013
Derek Stuart	Ken Olandt	1989
Maggie Sullivan	Tammy Lauren	2006–08
Patrick Sullivan	Sid Conrad	1986
Patrick Sullivan	Darrell Zwerling	1986
Tim Sullivan	Scott Palmer	1983–89
George Summers	Duke Stroud	1995
George Summers	Unknown	2002
George Summers	Ken Howard	2012
Lydia Callahan Summers	Abby Dalton	1995
Lydia Callahan Summers	Terie Lynn Davis	1996
Lydia Callahan Summers	Rosemary Murphy	1998
Phyllis Summers	Michelle Stafford	1994–97, 2000–13, 2019–
Phyllis Summers	Sandra Nelson	1997–99
Phyllis Summers	Gina Tognoni	2014–19

== T ==
Character	Portrayer	Duration
Kristen Talbert	Susan Angelo	1991, 1995
Daniel Tanaka	George Takei	2003
Rose Tatlin	Maria Stanton	1997–2000
Charles Taylor	John Rubinstein	2009–10
Karen Taylor	Nia Peeples	2007–09
Shawn Taylor	Devon Martinez	2016
Marshall Tenney	Jared Day	2008
Joseph Thomas	Quinn Redeker	1973
Keith Thomas	Kevin Ashworth	2011
Debbie Thompson	Andrea Elson	1998
Gary Thompson	Ned Hall	1986
Nora Thompson	Anita Finlay	1999–2006
Derek Thurston	Caleb Stoddard	1976
Derek Thurston	Jeff Cooper	1976
Derek Thurston	Joe LaDue	1977–84
Denise Tolliver	Telma Hopkins	2021
Rafe Torres	Yani Gellman	2008–12
Vinny Trabuco	Joe Maruzzo	2005
Austin Travers	Matthew Atkinson	2014–15
Erica Trott	Kyli Santiago	2002
Grace Turner	Josie Davis	1996–97
Grace Turner	Jennifer Gareis	1997–2000, 2002, 2004, 2014
Rose Turner	Leslie Stevens	2013

== V ==
Character	Portrayer	Duration
Esther Valentine	Kate Linder	1982–
Kate Valentine	Darla and Sandra Greer	1990–91
Ryan Vanderbilt	Gordon Greene	2000
Theo Vanderway	Tyler Johnson	2019–21
Ines Vargas	Marisa Ramirez	2007
Simone Vauban	Anita Jodelsohn	1981
Angelina Veneziano	Diana DeGarmo	2011–12
Angelo Veneziano	Mike Starr	2010–12
Carla Vente	Kate Miller	2013
Jamie Vernon	Daniel Polo	2012–13
Sally Vincent	Juliette Jeffers	1992
Tony Viscardi	Nick Scotti	1996–99
Tony Viscardi	Jay Bontatibus	1999–2000
Mai Volien	Marianne Rees	1994–96
Maris Voorhies	Marianne Muellerleile	1999

== W ==
Character	Portrayer	Duration
Susan Wade	Carole Ruggier	2018
Pete Walker	William Bassett	1982–83
Gil Wallace	Cassius Willis	2008–09
Alistair Wallingford	Jerry Douglas	2008
Fuzzy Walsh	Dylan Kenin	2004–05
Ian Ward	Ray Wise	2014–16
Sage Warner	Kelly Sullivan	2014–16
Thad Warner	Carl Weyant	2006–08
Larry Warton	David "Shark" Fralick	1995–96, 1999–2005
James Warwick	Ian Buchanan	1995
Connie Wayne	Kathleen Fitzgerald	1990–97
Connie Wayne	Lise Simms	1999–2004
Calvin Wealey	Erwin Fuller	1992
Paul Webb	David Starzyk	2007–08
Dorothy Weber	Muriel Minot	1996–97
Hank Weber	Sherman Augustus	2002–05
Piper Welch	Ellery Sprayberry	2011
Florence Webster	Sharon Farrell	1991–96
Nina Webster	Tricia Cast	1986–2001, 2008–14, 2020–
Lindsey Wells	Uncredited	1983
Lindsey Wells	Lauren Koslow	1984–86
Diane Westin	Devon Pierce	1990–91
Marcus Wheeler	Mark Pinter	2013
Fran Whittaker	Susan Brown	1975
Mark Wilcox	Bruce Gray	1986
Bob Wilkins	Phil Proctor	1995
Roy Wilkins	Rodney Saulsberry	1990
Jordan Wilde	Darnell Kirkwood	2017–18
Mason Wilder	Lamon Archey	2012–14
Sarge Wilder	Darnell Williams	2012–13
Annie Wilkes	Marcia Wallace	2009
Roger Wilkes	David Leisure	2009
Carl Williams (a.k.a. Jim Davis)	Brett Hadley	1980–84, 1986–90, 1998–99
Mary Williams	Carolyn Conwell	1980–2004
Patty Williams	Tammy Taylor	1980
Patty Williams	Lilibet Stern	1980–83
Patty Williams	Andrea Evans	1983–84
Patty Williams	Stacy Haiduk	2009–12, 2015–16
Patty Williams	Tammy Barr	2009
Paul Williams	Doug Davidson	1978–2020
Ricky Williams	Unknown actors	
Ricky Williams	Peter Porte	2011–12
Steven Williams	David Winn	1980–81
Todd Williams	Corbin Bernsen	2003–04, 2009–10, 2012–14, 2017
Amy Wilson	Robin Scott	1994
Amy Wilson	Julianne Morris	1994–96, 2014
Cliff Wilson	David Cowgill	1993–96
Judy Wilson	Loyita Chapel	1980–81
Jodi Wing	Brittany Ishibashi	2011
Drucilla Barber Winters	Victoria Rowell	1990–98, 2000, 2002–07
Drucilla Barber Winters	Dawn McMillan	1996
Drucilla Barber Winters	Kent Masters King	2000
Ellen Winters	Jennifer Karr	1986–87
Lily Winters	Vanessa Carlson	1996
Lily Winters	Brooke Marie Bridges	1997–98, 2000
Lily Winters	Christel Khalil	2002–
Lily Winters	Davetta Sherwood	2006
Lucinda Winters	Nichelle Nichols	2016
Malcolm Winters	Shemar Moore	1994–2002, 2004–05, 2014, 2019, 2023
Malcolm Winters	Darius McCrary	2009–11
Neil Winters	Kristoff St. John	1991–2019
Olivia Barber Winters	Tonya Lee Williams	1990–2005, 2007–12
Richard Womack	Myk Watford	2013–14
Laird Worthington	Nick Meaney	1999–2005

== Y ==
Character	Actor/Actress	Duration
Mary Yeaker	Elizabeth Karr	2007
Sam Yemoto	Ken Narasaki	
Kaito Yoshida	Eidan Hanzei	2012
