= List of The Young and the Restless characters introduced in 2024 =

List of The Young and the Restless characters that debuted in 2024

The Young and the Restless is an American CBS soap opera which debuted on March 26, 1973. This is a list of its characters that debuted in 2024, in order of first appearance. The first character to be introduced was Seth Morgan (Brian Gaskill), the sponsor of Nikki Newman (Melody Thomas Scott), who debuted on January 8. Alan Laurent (Christopher Cousins), a psychiatrist and friend of Ashley Abbott (Eileen Davidson), made his first appearance on April 30. Additionally, multiple other characters appeared throughout the year.

== Seth Morgan ==
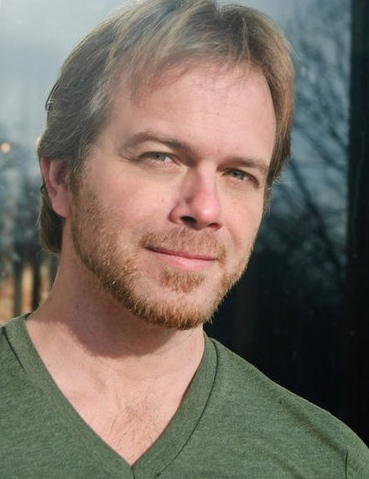
Brian Gaskill portrayed Seth Morgan from January to March 2024.

Seth Morgan, played by Brian Gaskill, made his first appearance on January 8, 2024. The character and casting was announced on December 29, 2023. The character was introduced as the sponsor of Nikki Newman (Melody Thomas Scott), whom she meets at an Alcoholics Anonymous meeting, with Seth being described as the man who would "Nikki Get Her Life Back on Track". Gaskill, who had previously appeared on five other American soap operas, recorded his audition at his home and found out over several weeks that he had won the role, which he found "pretty affirming" as he had not auditioned for some time. Following the casting announcement, Gaskill spoke about it on his Facebook page, saying that he felt "honored" to be on the soap. Gaskill had previously been unsure of whether he would appear in daytime television again due to there being less soap operas and opportunities than there used to be. He found adjusting to The Young and the Restless's climate stressful "in a good way", and revealed that he had previously spoken to some of his co-stars, such as J. Eddie Peck, on Facebook before he began working on set. Speaking of the character, Gaskill explained: "As of now, Seth is a good person but he's certainly not a hero. He feels reachable and comfortable for me. In recent years, when I look at the kind of stuff that I would really like to be doing, Seth falls into that category. I usually try to find some lightness where it's dark and darkness where it's light, and I'm just trying to find that balance. This character sort of seems to allow all of that. So far, it's been an incredible experience." On March 5, 2024, Gaskill made his final appearance as Seth, with the character being killed off. Following the episode being aired, Gaskill confirmed the departure with a statement on his Instagram page, where he explained that he enjoyed working on the soap with the cast and the rest of the team, and called it "incredible" to have received "so much support" on social media.

Seth becomes the sponsor of recovering alcoholic Nikki, who has relapsed after having had alcohol injected into her veins by Jordan Howard (Colleen Zenk). Nikki drops him as a sponsor when she finds out that he has drunk alcohol and tells him that she cannot be around him. The following month, he meets "Isabelle", not knowing that she is Jordan in disguise, who claims to be a friend of Nikki's who wants Seth and Nikki to reconnect. He and Nikki later meet, where she tells him about Jordan and he tells her about his encounter with "Isabelle". Having figured out that Jordan is Isabelle, Seth confronts her and tells her that she is going to bring her to the police. Jordan pretends to agree to his plan, but when they are outside, she kills him by pushing him into an incoming vehicle.

Prior to his first appearance, Amy Mistretta from Soaps She Knows called having Gaskill appear on the soap a "real treat". Mistretta's colleague, Charlie Mason, wrote that he had "high hopes" for the character, partially due to Seth not being related to other characters in the show. Following Seth's death, Mason wrote that he would miss the character and called him "a short-term pawn in Crazy Aunt Jordan's game of Kill the Newmans." Mason believed that Seth had made the "fatal mistake" by confronting Jordan. Terrell Smith from What to Watch wrote that Seth's departure would upset fans, commenting, "Gaskill had a good run on the soap, and it's sad to see him leave". EmilyAnn Jackman from Pennlive.com wrote that Seth's death "took a lot of fans by surprise" due to it being an exit "most probably didn't see coming", and she reported how fans commented on his Instagram statement to "express their shock" regarding his departure.

== Alan Laurent ==
Alan Laurent, played by soap veteran Christopher Cousins, made his first appearance on April 30, 2024. Alan - who had already been mentioned in prior episodes - was reported to appear in multiple episodes in a recurring role. Alan was introduced as a psychiatrist and friend of Ashley Abbott's (Eileen Davidson) from her time in Paris.

Prior to the character's first appearance, Diane Brounstein from Soap Opera Digest called Alan a "pivotal role". Chris Eades from Soaps In Depth hoped that the character would be able to help Ashley, who he believed needs professional help due to her struggling with Dissociative identity disorder. Kelli Boyle from TV Insider called Alan joining the Paris mystery storyline an "interesting twist". Charlie Mason from Soaps She Knows named Alan as one of the best successes of the 2024 American May Sweeps, writing, "We may not be crazy about Young & Restless' story of Ashley's alters, but we love having Christopher Cousins around as Alan. Can we please keep the soap vet for [Ashley's sister] Traci?" Cousins made his final appearance as Alan on June 7, 2024, with the character being killed by his identical twin brother, Martin Laurent, who assumed his identity. Although Alan last appeared on June 7, 2024, Cousins continued to be credited as Alan until April 10, 2025, when Martin’s deception was exposed and the actor exited the role.

== Others ==
Character	Episode date(s)	Portrayer	Details	Ref(s).
Nadia	February 14	Coco Nation	A child with pneumonia who Claire Grace (Hayley Erin) looks after at the hospital. They bond over their love of Greek mythology and Claire introduces Nadia to her mother, Victoria Newman (Amelia Heinle).	
Dr Alcott	March 4–5, March 19	Catherine Dyer	The psychiatrist of Connor Newman (Judah Mackey).	
Truck driver	April 23	Andre Hotchko	A truck driver involved in the kidnapping of Harrison Abbott (Redding Munsell).	
Martin Laurent	May 30, 2024–April 10, 2025 (recurring basis) July 22, 2026 (special guest appearance)	Christopher Cousins	Alan Laurent’s identical twin brother, who posed as him following Alan’s death on June 7, 2024, until his deception was exposed on April 10, 2025. Martin returned for a special guest appearance on July 22, 2026.	
Dawn	June 3–4	Gina Garcia-Sharp	The assistant of Tucker McCall (Trevor St. John) who helps him in Paris with his rivalry with Audra Charles (Zuleyka Silver).	
Doctor	June 17	Marc Forget	A Parisian doctor who helps Tucker McCall (St. John) with a crisis.	
Miriam	July 22	Isabella Dake	A friend of Faith Newman (Reylynn Caster). When she and Faith are talking, Lucy Romalotti (Lily Brooks O'Briant) approaches them and is excited to go with them to a pool party, but Faith tells that she is not allowed to come with them and she and Miriam leave.	
Reverend Holmes	November 13–14	Melvin Robert	A minister who marries Abby Newman (Melissa Ordway) and Devon Hamilton (Bryton James).	
