= California Girls (film) =

- Film Poster
- Genre: Comedy; Drama
- Written by: Charles Rosin
- Directed by: Rick Wallace
- Starring: Robby Benson; Doris Roberts; Martin Mull; Zsa Zsa Gabor; Martha Longley; Charles Rocket
- Music by: Mark Snow
- Country of origin: United States
- Original language: English

Production
- Producer: R.W. Goodwin
- Cinematography: Gil Hubbs
- Editor: Michael Jablow
- Production company: ABC Circle Films

Original release
- Network: ABC
- Release: March 24, 1985

California Girls is a 1985 American made-for-television comedy-drama film starring Robby Benson and Martin Mull, directed by Rick Wallace. It originally aired on ABC on March 24, 1985.

== Plot ==
A Jersey City auto mechanic travels to California in search of his dream girl, the "California Girl", a girl he saw in cosmetics commercials. He meets the woman of his dreams and a Hollywood photographer, who show him the good life of Los Angeles. The "dream girl" convinces him to follow his dreams and open his own garage with an inheritance from his father. However, the manager may have other plans, and he sees that having his own business is not as hunky dory as he believed. He is a great mechanic, but, because he lacks business acumen, he ends up doing all the hard work at the garage.

He is left high and dry as the business goes belly up, the manager skips town, and his girlfriend has a new beau, thereby throwing him out on the street, just as a California earthquake strikes. Turns out, it is all a dream/nightmare, and the mechanic has second thoughts about going to California after all, but is convinced by his bowling buddy to give it a shot. Upon arrival, he is shocked to learn that it is not much different from his hometown, i.e., rude people, dreary weather, until he meets a nice, down-to-earth woman who also came from New Jersey.

== Cast ==
- Robby Benson as Nathan Bowzer
- Martin Mull as Elliot
- Charles Rocket as Barry
- Ernie Hudson as Ernie
- Tawny Kitaen as Karen Malone
- Doris Roberts as Mrs. Bowzer
- Robert Pastorelli as Mechanic
- Norman Alden as Mr. Pegem
- Zsa Zsa Gabor as herself
- Regis Philbin as himself
- Martha Longley as Heather
- Robert Firth as Sean
- Robert Parucha as Corky
