= Rory Gibson =

American actor (born 1995)

- Born: November 22, 1995 (age 30); Long Beach, California, US
- Occupation: Actor
- Years active: 2018–present
- Television: The Young and the Restless; General Hospital
- Spouse: Alicia Ruelas (m. 2026)

Rory Gibson (born November 22, 1995) is an American actor. Born and raised in southern California, Gibson moved to Los Angeles to pursue an acting career. Since 2018, Gibson has appeared in several films and short films, including A Night to Regret, Grace, Twisted Twin, Severed Road and Rebel Moon – Part One: A Child of Fire. Between 2021 and 2023, Gibson portrayed Noah Newman on the CBS soap opera The Young and the Restless. In 2025, he assumed the role of Michael Corinthos on General Hospital.

== Early life and career ==
Rory Gibson was born on November 22, 1995, in Long Beach, California. Gibson's father Gary Gibson was a professional football player who played for the San Francisco 49ers. Gibson was raised in southern California, but he then moved to Los Angeles to pursue his acting career. In 2018, Rory portrayed Eric in the television film A Night to Regret, and the following year he appeared as Lucas Walker in the short film Grace. In 2020, he portrayed Damon in the television film Twisted Twin. Gibson also portrayed Nathan in the Severed Road and Billy in How Jessica Died. Gibson has also worked as a fitness instructor for the gym Barry's Bootcamp, where he interacted with many celebrities.

In August 2021, it was announced that Gibson had joined the cast of the CBS soap opera The Young and the Restless as Noah Newman, the son of supercouple Nick and Sharon (Joshua Morrow and Sharon Case), taking over the role from Robert Adamson. Gibson had previously auditioned for a small role on the soap a few years prior but was unsuccessful, which Gibson believed was because they asked him to sing. When Gibson's agent sent him a casting notice about the role of Noah, Gibson sent in a self-tape. The producers contacted Gibson to say that they were bringing him in for a callback but they did not really like the tape, which Gibson believed was because he played Noah more on his "tense and greedy side". Speaking about his second audition, Gibson revealed, "I changed it up this time and I guess they liked it because they brought me in to test with Joshua Morrow. It was a really chill experience. Everyone was super-accommodating. I actually dropped one of my very first lines, and Josh took the rap for it." Gibson called Morrow "such a nice dude" and explained that he welcomed him after he was cast on the soap, and that Morrow made it easier for him on his first day on set. Gibson revealed that he was "loving" being on the soap. In 2025, Gibson said that he was still close to Morrow and regarded him as a second father.

Gibson made his first appearance as Noah in October 2021. Gibson's storylines as Noah included his heartbreak with his ex-girlfriend Tessa Porter (Cait Fairbanks), moving from London back to Genoa City, working at New Hope, developing a romance with Allie Nguyen (Kelsey Wang) and the introduction of Noah's ex-girlfriend, Audra Charles (Zuleyka Silver), who broke his heart. In November 2022, it was confirmed that Gibson and Wang had been moved to recurring status on the soap and they continued to make sporadic appearances until 2023. Charlie Mason from Soaps She Knows reported how viewers wanted Gibson and Wang to return as Noah and Allie. After he stopped appearing on the soap, Gibson struggled financially due to a lack of roles and the 2023 SAG-AFTRA strike, which led to him and his fiancée "couch-surfing" for about a year as they could not afford rent due to Gibson's difficulties and the lack of work that his fiancée found as a professional model. Their financial situation improved when he began working as a trainer at a gym in 2024. Gibson reflected that he did not feel "terribly fulfilled" on The Young and the Restless.

In 2023, Gibson had a minor role in the space opera film Rebel Moon – Part One: A Child of Fire. Though he only worked there for less than two weeks, Gibson called being part of the film "incredible" and an "amazing experience" and he enjoyed working with director Zack Snyder and actress Sofia Boutella. Gibson has also been part of Brad Everett Young's "Dream Loud" campaign, an organization which works on preserving arts and music programs in schools. In 2025, it was announced that Gibson had been cast in the new science fiction movie Fugitive from Asteron, where he will portray Arial, one of the leading characters.

In May 2025, it was announced that Gibson had joined the cast of the soap opera General Hospital as Michael Corinthos, taking over from Chad Duell. He made his debut in the episode that originally aired on May 23 of that year. Gibson originally read for a different role and spoke to the soap's executive producer, Frank Valentini; he was then called back for the role of Michael and had various screentests with other cast members before being cast. Gibson's family had watched the soap growing up and he first told his grandmother that he got the role as she was a "diehard" fan of the soap, who was very happy about the news. He found playing the role "intense" but exciting, and noted how many viewers had speculated that he had been cast on the soap after he posted a picture in his dressing room. He also felt a "really strong connection" to Michael's character and noted that he got on well with his co-stars, calling it a "wonderful time". Gibson's recast was well-received by viewers and critics; Charlie Mason from Soaps She Knows wrote that "the feat that Gibson has pulled off is impressive" and considered him one of the best recasts in American soap operas, commenting "what a job he's done" in regards to bringing out Michael's "dark side". Matthew Biggin from Screen Rant believed that Gibson could "breathe new life into Michael as a character". Gibson expected to receive some negative reactions but felt "very welcomed" by viewers being "unbelievably, overwhelmingly kind". He has also noted that he felt more "fulfilled" than he did whilst on The Young and the Restless.

== Personal life ==
Gibson is a pescetarian and practises intermittent fasting. Gibson practises Muay Thai and likes spending time outdoors. Gibson has been in a relationship with professional model Alicia Ruelas, whom he met in high school; the couple celebrated 14 years together in 2025. In October 2022, Ruelas announced on social media that she and Gibson were engaged. The following year, the couple announced the death of their dog, Clementine, on social media, with Gibson revealing that she had died from heart disease and heart failure after being diagnosed roughly a month prior, having been born with several birth abnormalities. Gibson had another dog named Chet, who died shortly before Gibson proposed to Ruelas in Hawaii. Gibson and Ruelas later obtained two new dogs named Cloud and Clementine.

== Filmography ==
List of acting roles
Year(s)	Title	Role	Notes
2018	A Night to Regret	Eric	Television film
2019	Grace	Lucas Walker	Short film
2020	Twisted Twin	Damon	Television film
2021–23	The Young and the Restless	Noah Newman	Regular role
2023	Rebel Moon – Part One: A Child of Fire	Kora's classmate	Space opera film
TBA	Severed Road	Nathan	To be released
TBA	How Jessica Died	Billy	In post-production
TBA	Fugitive from Asteron	Arial	In production
2025–	General Hospital	Michael Corinthos	Regular role
