= Anthony Pena =

American actor (born 1947)

- Born: February 18, 1947 (age 78); San Antonio, Texas

Anthony Pena (born February 18, 1947) is an American actor best known for his portrayal of Newman family butler, Miguel Rodriquez, on the CBS daytime soap opera, The Young and the Restless. Prior to joining the series in 1984, Pena starred on General Hospital as Harry Greg. His numerous television credits include guest roles on Highway to Heaven, Dynasty and MacGyver. In 1996, Pena won a Nosotros Silver Anniversary Golden Eagle Award for his contributions to Daytime television.

He left The Young and the Restless in 2006 after 22 years, but his character was not written out off-screen until 2008.

He also appeared in the 1982 movie Megaforce, the 1983 film Porky's II: The Next Day as John Henry's Brother, and the 1987 movie The Running Man as Valdez (credited as Anthony Penya).

== Filmography ==
Year	Title	Role	Notes
1976	Marathon Man	Guard in Uruguay #2	
1979	The Last Word	Chuy	
1980	Humanoids from the Deep	Johnny Eagle	
1982	Megaforce	Sixkiller	
1983	Porky's II: The Next Day	Bill Jumper	
1984	Weekend Pass	Officer Anthony	
1987	The Running Man	Valdez	
1988	Colors	Traffic Officer	
1989	Born on the Fourth of July	Bartender	
1990	Catchfire	Taos Sheriff	
1993	The Cool Surface	Policeman #1	
