= List of The Young and the Restless characters introduced in 2022 =

The Young and the Restless is an American CBS soap opera which debuted on March 26, 1973. This is a list of its characters that debuted in 2022, in order of first appearance. Allie Nguyen (Kelsey Wang), the previously unknown granddaughter of Jack Abbott (Peter Bergman), made her first appearance in March, as did Tanya (Julia Montgomery), an estate agent. Investigative reporter Talia Morgan (Natalie Morales) made her first appearance in August, whilst Audra Charles (Zuleyka Silver) debuted in September. Jeremy Stark (James Hyde), a man from Diane Jenkins's (Susan Walters) past, first appeared in October. Additionally, several other characters appeared throughout the year.

== Allie Nguyen ==
Allie Nguyen
- The Young and the Restless character
- Portrayed by: Kelsey Wang
- Duration: 2022–2023
- First appearance: March 10, 2022
- Last appearance: April 18, 2023
- Created by: Josh Griffith
- Introduced by: Anthony Morina and Josh Griffith
In-universe information
- Occupation: Chemistry student
- Father: Keemo Volien Abbott
- Grandfathers: Jack Abbott
- Grandmothers: Luan Volien
- Uncles: John Abbott III; Kyle Abbott
- Aunts: Mai Volien
- Other relatives: Ashley Abbott; Traci Abbott; Billy Abbott; Abby Newman

Allie Nguyen, played by Kelsey Wang, made her first appearance on March 10, 2022. She was introduced as the previously unknown granddaughter of Jack Abbott (Peter Bergman). Prior to her first appearance, Allie was referred by the soap as being "a mysterious, young professional who catches the eye of one of Genoa City’s eligible bachelors", with Charlie Mason from Soaps She Knows speculating that she may be a love interest for Noah Newman (Rory Gibson). Mason also correctly speculated that Allie may be the daughter of Keemo Volien Abbott (Philip Moon), the estranged son of Jack. Mason also speculated that Allie and Noah would be the "New Kyle and Summer". Wang teased a romance for Allie and Noah and assured fans that Allie was not a scammer for the Abbott family. In November 2022, it was announced that Wang and Gibson had been dropped to recurring status, but continued to make appearances.

"There's a blossoming relationship with Noah. A lot is going to come very soon, and I think the viewers will be very happy."

— Wang on Allie and Noah's romance (2022)

When Jack finds out that Keemo has died, he and Phyllis Summers (Michelle Stafford) travel to Keemo's old house for closure. Whilst there, Jack finds a photo of Keemo with Allie and her phone number and, not knowing who she is, arranges to meet with her, where it is revealed that she is his granddaughter. Allie is initially unsure of getting to know Jack, with Keemo having told her that he had never met his father, but after some persuasion from a woman calling herself "Taylor Jensen", she decides to meet up with him in a cafe, where she reveals that she wants to be a chemist. It is revealed that "Taylor" is actually Diane Jenkins (Susan Walters), the mother of Jack's son Kyle Abbott (Michael Mealor), who has been presumed dead for more than a decade. Allie is shocked at Diane abandoning her son.

Allie visits Jack in the Abbott Mansion in Genoa City and meets Jack's siblings and their children. She is welcomed by Jack's sisters Traci (Beth Maitland) and Ashley Abbott (Eileen Davidson) and Ashley's daughter Abby Newman (Melissa Ordway), who want to get to know her. Allie meets several other residents, including Abby's nephew Noah and his half-sister and Kyle's wife Summer Newman (Allison Lanier), who encourages Allie to accompany her to Mariah Copeland (Camryn Grimes) and Tessa Porter (Cait Fairbanks)'s wedding. A romance develops between Allie and Noah. The couple then leave Genoa City, with Allie working in a Jabot lab in Paris but continuing to see Noah regularly. The couple return briefly in 2023 to support Summer when her mother, Phyllis, is presumed dead.

Candace Young from Soaps She Knows called Allie "ever-understanding and mature" and criticised the lack of development and drama that happened in Allie and Noah's relationship, also noting that fans were shocked with the fact that the two characters were sent overseas when already being underused. Charlie Mason and Richard Simms from the same website wrote that Allie had the "Strangest Monologue" of 2022 in American soap operas, commenting that "We actually felt kinda bad for Young & Restless newcomer Kelsey Wang when her Allie was stuck wandering around Keemo's empty house talking to her dead dad. Thankfully, she soon had a new talk-to in ~~Taylor~~ Diane… not to mention a beau in Noah." Chris Eades from Soaps In Depth said that whilst Allie was a new character, she's "also steeped in the show’s history".

== Tanya ==
Tanya, played by Julia Montgomery, appeared on March 23, 2022. Tanya's casting was announced earlier that month, with it being reported that Tanya would Los Angeles real estate agent. Montgomery, who had previously appeared on another soap opera, is also a real estate agent, which Amy Mistretta from Soaps She Knows called "a fun twist". Due to this, the directors allowed Montgomery to change a few words to make it sound more realistic, with the actress saying she felt like she had "free rein". Montgomery enjoyed working on the soap and said that she would be interesting in returning, adding that "Genoa City could use a good real estate agent".

Tanya is a real estate agent who meets with Allie Nguyen (Kelsey Wang) about selling her father's house. Taylor reveals that the women who bought the house will be coming soon, and she leaves Allie to talk to her once she arrives. The women is revealed to be the presumed dead Diane Jenkins (Susan Walters), who is using a fake name "Taylor Jenson".

== Talia Morgan ==
Talia Morgan, played by Natalie Morales, made her first appearance on August 17, 2022, as a recurring role. Her casting was announced in July 2022, with it being reported that the part would be "small" but that she would appear throughout the months to explore to mystery of Diane Jenkins's (Susan Walters) past. Morales revealed on The Talk that she had been having "so much fun" on the soap and that she would "love to do one of those soap opera slaps!" Morales enjoyed working with her co-stars Walters, Melody Thomas Scott (Nikki Newman) and Michelle Stafford (Phyllis Summers), calling them "incredible women".

Talia is an investigative journalist who initially reaches out to Nikki to do a story on the death of her son-in-law, Ashland Locke (Robert Newman). However, Nikki suggests Talia to do a story on the return of Diane, who had been presumed dead for over a decade. Talia continues meeting up with Nikki and Phyllis to discuss the story. When the story on Diane is finally published, the planned follow-ups in the series are cancelled by Talia's publisher. It is then revealed that the publisher was pursued by Tucker McCall (Trevor St. John) to ditch the articles, and Talia interviews him. Talia also talks to Nikki about Deacon Sharpe (Sean Kanan). Talia eventually grows tired of the "smear campaign" against Diane.

Lauren Huff from Entertainment Weekly wrote "Talk about life imitating art" following the news of Morales joining the soap opera.

== Audra Charles ==
Audra Charles, portrayed by Zuleyka Silver, made her first appearance on September 23, 2022. Silver began filming on August 13 of that year. The CBS website refers to the character as a "successful businesswoman" who "arrives in Genoa City with a secret agenda and a mysterious past." Speaking of Audra's characterisation in 2023, Silver revealed that Audra does not "fully" trust anyone, explaining: "She's been let down enough times to know better. But the more time you spend with someone, there's always the possibility of becoming vulnerable to them. And she's not a robot, right? But she likes to keep people at a distance, emotionally, especially after what she went through with Noah".

Audra arrives to Genoa City to help the Chancellor-Winters company go public, having been hired by Jill Abbott (Jess Walton). Audra then bumps into Noah Newman (Rory Gibson) in a nightclub, and it is revealed that he is her ex-boyfriend. Noah tells his new girlfriend, Allie Nguyen (Kelsey Wang), that their relationship was toxic as they were always fighting. Audra is revealed to be working with Tucker McCall (Trevor St. John), giving him information on when Chancellor-Winters will go public. However, the plan later begins to go wrong.

Candace Young from Soaps She Knows referred to Audra as Noah's "vixen-ish lost love from London. Charlie Mason and Richard Simms from the same website called Audra the "Most Improved Character" in American soap operas in 2023, writing that Audra "finally came into her own thanks to a risky alliance with Nate, a tawdry affair with Kyle and a real flair for reaction shots". Michelle Parkerton from Soaps In Depth called Audra a "troublemaker" who has caused "havoc" in Genoa City. Parkerton's colleague, Chris Eades, noted that Audra had "established herself as someone who can hold her own among the town's power players", and added that she was "determined to make her mark". Candace Young from Soaps She Knows commented on how Audra has "been wrangling one man after another since arriving in Genoa City". A writer from Daytime Confidential called Audra a "business-minded character".

== Jeremy Stark ==
Jeremy Stark, played by James Hyde, made his first appearance on October 21, 2022. He was described as a "mystery man" from Diane Jenkins's (Susan Walters) past. Hyde had previously acted in three other American soap operas and had thought that he would want to be on The Young and the Restless if he ever returned to Daytime television, with the actor's agent reaching out to the soap over several roles. After Hyde unsuccessfully auditioned for Tucker McCall, the soap's casting associate, Greg Salmon, emailed Hyde suggesting that they could incorporate him into the soap, and he was later offered the part of Jeremy, which he began filming in Late September. Hyde found his first day on set "amazing" and enjoyed working with Walters. Hyde felt welcomed by the over cast on the show, with Peter Bergman, who plays Jack Abbott, being the first co-star to "step forward" and make him feel "at home".

Hyde made his last appearance on April 17, 2023, when the character was killed-off after being stabbed by Phyllis Summers (Michelle Stafford). Hyde confirmed on Instagram that he had departed the soap, saying that he "loved the character" and that "it was unfortunate the way it happened, but that's the way it goes." Hyde had previously hinted on social media that he would be departing the soap, where he included "Nothing lasts forever". When asked over whether Jeremy was really dead, Hyde revealed that it was the "end" for Jeremy but added that "We're doing a soap, so you never know", and referenced the fact that fans did not see Jeremy's dead body "wrapped" in the sheet. On behalf of his character, Hyde said that he hoped that Diane would be arrested. Hyde also urged fans to reach out to The Young and the Restless if they wanted him to return to the soap. Hyde's co-star, Rory Gibson (Noah Newman), expressed regret that he had not been able to work with Hyde.

Jeremy used to blackmail Diane into laundering money for him, and he later goes to prison, having not given the police any information on Diane. After being released from prison, Jeremy turns up at the Abbott's house, looking for Diane, after being tipped off by Phyllis. Diane's son, Kyle Abbott (Michael Mealor), warns Jeremy away from Diane. Jeremy confronts Diane and tells her to repay him the money that she stole. Jack offers to pay back the money but Jeremy refuses. Diane claims to Jeremy that she is conning Jack and wants a partnerships with Jeremy. Jeremy, wanting proof that she is being truthful, orders her to commit theft, so she presents him with Nikki Newman's (Melody Thomas Scott) necklace, leading to Jeremy and Diane kissing. Jeremy realises that he has been set up when he is arresting by Chance Chancellor (Conner Floyd) for stealing the necklace due to it being found at his house.

Jeremy returns a month later and asks Phyllis to team up with him. She turns him down but eventually agrees. Jeremy tells Diane and Jack that he is not looking for payback, but Diane and Jack go into hiding regardless. Phyllis lures them back into town by claiming that Jeremy had left town looking for Diane. Diane accuses Phyllis and Jeremy of working together, but they deny it. Phyllis and Jeremy attend Genoa City's bicentennial celebrations, and Phyllis lures Diane into a confrontation and accuses her of trying to kill her. Phyllis then collapses and taken into an ambulance by two men that Jeremy had hired to pose as paramedics. Jeremy announces that he and Phyllis are now married and accuses Diane of harming her. Phyllis is then announced to have died in an ambulance explosion and Diane is arrested for harming her. It is then revealed that Phyllis is alive and it was set up by Phyllis and Jeremy to set up Diane.

Phyllis, who is hiding in a motel, begins having second thoughts about the plan, so Jeremy threatens to kill her. Jeremy refuses to leave Phyllis, despite initially intending to go their separate ways, due to not trusting her, and unsuccessfully tries to kiss Phyllis. Fearing she will ruin the plan, Jeremy tries to kill Phyllis with a pair of scissors, which ends with Phyllis stabbing him to death with the scissors in the ensuring struggle. Phyllis disposes of his body in the river, where it is found by Chance, who was looking for Jeremy due to believing that he was an accomplice of Diane. Phyllis is later arrested for his murder and is sentenced to six months of community service and one year of probation.

Candace Young from Soaps She Knows called Jeremy a "baddie" and "nefarious" character who had "insinuated himself into Genoa City society while seeking revenge on his ex for sending him to prison and keeping his money". Young noted that fans were "thrilled" when Jeremy returned after being framed, and added that fans were left "concerned" when Hyde hinted that he would be leaving the role. Young's colleagues, Charlie Mason and Richard Simms, called Phyllis and Jeremy's plan to frame Diane the "Most Harebrained Scheme" of 2023 in American soap operas.

== Others ==
Character	Portrayer	Episode date(s)	Details	Ref(s).
Dr Huffman	Jeremiah Jahi	March 3 and 11	Dr Huffman is therapist of Chance Chancellor (Conner Floyd), who is seeking help for his PTSD.	
Cindy	Gabriella Hart	March 8	Cindy, a social media influencer, bumps into Noah Newman (Rory Gibson) and they begin chatting. It later transpires that she is a big fan of Noah's half-sister, Mariah Copeland (Camryn Grimes) and her girlfriend, Tessa Porter (Cait Fairbanks). She gets excited when she meets the couple is overjoyed when Tessa gives her a compliment. Cindy then asks Mariah a lot of questions about her relationship with Tessa.	
Dwight	Sam McMurray	May 23	A man who Esther Valentine (Kate Linder) meets on a dating app for seniors. They meet in a park, with Esther's daughter, Chloe Mitchell (Elizabeth Hendrickson), keeping an eye on them to ensure that Esther is safe. Dwight and Esther have a nice together	
Giancarlo	Antione Grant	June 10–14	Giancarlo is the date of Imani Benedict (Leigh Ann Rose) that she brings to the Chancellor-Winters launch party. After he buys her coffee, Imani's half-sister Amanda Sinclair (Mishael Morgan) suggests that Imani should ask him out.	
Stannis	Bill Sebastian	July 7–8	Stannis is a henchman of Ashland Locke (Robert Newman). He helps Ashland keep Michael Baldwin (Christian LeBlanc) captive in Peru and then comes to Genoa City to spy on the Newman family for Ashland.	
Lucas	Aaron Schwartz	August 24–25	Lucas is the criminal associate of Adam Newman (Mark Grossman). Adam get Lucas to steal Kevin Fisher's (Greg Rikaart) laptop, wanting to see if the police have any evidence of Victor Newman (Eric Braeden) being involved in Ashland Locke's (Robert Newman) car accident. Lucas breaks into Kevin's car to do so and asks Adam if he can keep Kevin's laptop bag. He also hacks into the laptop and gets the information for Adam.	
Dr Malone	Anna Khaja	November 8 and 11	Dr Malone is the therapist of Chelsea Lawson (Melissa Claire Egan). She encourages Chelsea to be open about her feelings and not hold back, and admits that she used to feel on edge when talking to patients who had attempted suicide. Chelsea then talks to her about her history and what led to her suicide attempt.	
