= Rianna Loving =

American entrepreneur and former actress

Rianna Loving (born September 13, 1980) is an American entrepreneur, beauty product developer, and former actress. She is the founder of the skincare company Organic to Green and is a licensed aesthetician, certified life coach, and real estate agent.

== Early life ==
Loving was born in Burbank, California, and is of mixed Filipino, French, German, and British descent. From age six, she trained in dance, piano, and vocals, later becoming a California Performing Arts Scholar in dance.

== Acting career ==
Loving began appearing in television commercials at age fifteen. From 1999 to 2000, she portrayed Rianna Miner on the CBS soap opera The Young and the Restless.

Her other television credits include recurring roles in Undressed, Beverly Hills, 90210, and The Bold and the Beautiful. She also appeared in episodes of The Andy Dick Show, American Family, and All That, and was featured in a Pepsi commercial alongside Ricky Martin.

== Business and writing career ==
In 2009, Loving launched Organic to Green, a clean beauty brand that debuted at Fred Segal in Santa Monica. The company focused on handcrafted organic products and established a community-based glass bottle reuse program in Venice, California, titled "ReUseCycle."

In 2018, she opened a flagship wellness space in Santa Monica that integrated traditional spa services with medical aesthetics.

Loving is a co-author of The Self-Care Guide for Girl Athletes (2023), written with her daughter, Sasha Giammarco. The book provides strategies for young women to manage the physical and mental pressures of competitive sports

== Professional certifications ==
Loving is a California Licensed Esthetician and a California Licensed Real Estate Agent. She is also a Certified Professional Life Coach, having completed her training through Loyola Marymount University.

=== Bibliography ===
- The Self-Care Guide for Girl Athletes (2023) – Co-authored with Sasha Giammarco. ISBN 979-8864746202
