= Leslie Bevis =

American model, actress (born 1954)

- Born: February 13, 1954 (age 72); Washington, D.C., U.S.
- Occupations: Actress; model
- Years active: 1983–1999

Leslie Bevis (born February 13, 1954) is an American former model and actress.

== Career ==
Bevis worked as a model in Europe before her work in film and television. Besides making several appearances on Star Trek: Deep Space Nine, she has made numerous other television appearances, such as in Matlock, V, Dallas, Street Hawk, Night Court, Falcon Crest, MacGyver, Hunter, Who's the Boss? and Murder, She Wrote. Bevis is perhaps best known for the role of Ruth Perkins in The Young and the Restless, which she played in 1998 and 1999.

She has also had minor roles in feature films such as Commanderette Zircon in Spaceballs, Cassandra in Alien Nation, and a news reporter in The Opposite of Sex.
