= Robert Parucha =

American actor

- Born: Robert Carl Parucha; October 2, 1955 (age 70); Los Angeles County, California
- Occupations: Actor, author, businessman
- Years active: 1983–present

Robert Carl Parucha (born October 2, 1955) is an American television actor who is most likely remembered for his ongoing roles in daytime soap operas as Matt Miller The Young and the Restless and as Eddie Reed in The Days of Our Lives. He is also an author.

== Background ==
Parucha was born in Los Angeles County, California, on October 2, 1955. He attended UC Santa Barbara, where he got a bachelor's degree in Psychology and master's degree in Religious Studies.

He is married with three children.

In The Young and the Restless, he played the part of Matt, brother of Victor. His character was also the son of Albert Miller, played by George Kennedy. He played that role from 1985 to 1987. From 1988 to 1989, he played Eddie Reed in The Days of Our Lives until the role was taken over by Deke Anderson.

== Career ==
One of Parucha's earliest roles played was Dean in Dynasty in the "Reunion in Singapore", which was aired on ABC on March 2, 1983. In January 1984, he appeared as Mark Tanner in an Emerald Point N.A.S. episode, "Secrets". On January 16, episode #1.3267 of The Young and the Restless was aired. He played the role of Matt Miller. Many more episodes featuring him were to follow. By the mid 80's his status as a soap opera star was evident, and he appeared at various public events with other celebrities and television actors. In 1986, Parucha was co-hosting a televised fashion show, "Spring Fashions for Men and Women".

According to the St. Louis Post-Dispatch in its September 20, 1987 issue, the writing was on the wall that he as Matt Miller in The Young and the Restless was being phased out.

Years later in 2003 and again February 18–19, 2020, when he reprised his Matt Miller role.

== Partial filmography ==
Television shows
Show	Episode	Role	Director	Year	Notes #
Dynasty	"Reunion in Singapore"	Dean	Gwen Arner	1983	
Emerald Point N.A.S.	"Secrets"	Mark Tanner	Ernest Pintoff	1984	
Lottery!	"St. Louis: Win or Lose"		Barry Crane	1984	
Dynasty	"Krystina"	Chauffeur	Jerome Courtland	1984	
Dynasty	"Reconciliation"	Alexis' Chauffeur	Nancy Malone	1985	
The Young and the Restless	105 episodes from 1985 to 1987	Matt Miller	Various	1985 to 1987	
Star's Table	Episode #1.5	Himself		1986	
Days of Our Lives	Various episodes from 1988 - 1989	Eddie Reed	Various	1988 to 1989	
Baywatch	"Money, Honey"	Dr. Frank Enriquez	Monte Markham	1991	
Santa Barbara	Episode #1.1927	Hurley	Peter Brinkerhoff	1992	
Santa Barbara	Episode #1.1931	Hurley	Peter Brinkerhoff	1992	
L.A. Law	"Finish Line"	Jury Foreperson		1994	
The Client	"The High Ground"	Pastor		1996	
High Incident	"Follow the Leader"	Reporter #2		1996	

Films
Title	Role	Director	Year	Notes #
California Girls	Corky	Rick Wallace	1985	

== Publications ==
Title	Pub	Year	ISBN	Notes #
The Maestro and Leaky Lopez	Xlibris Corporation	2009	1441529462, 9781441529466	
