= Marilyn Alex =

American actress

- Born: Los Angeles, California, U.S.
- Occupation: Actress
- Years active: 1972-present
- Children: 2

Marilyn Alex is an American actress. She is best known for playing the role of Molly Carter on the CBS soap operas The Young and the Restless (1991 to 1993, 2005) and The Bold and the Beautiful (1992 to 1993, 1994, 1997 to 1998).

== Early life ==
Alex was born and raised in Los Angeles, California. Her family ran an electrical appliance store.

== Career ==
Alex had a small role on the NBC soap opera Days of Our Lives in 1972. She then moved to New York, where she was an understudy for Broadway productions of Deathtrap and Agnes of God. Alex replaced the leads and joined national tours of both productions. She also played the title role in a production of Driving Miss Daisy in New Jersey.

Alex appeared as Mrs. Dawson on the ABC soap opera General Hospital. As Nurse Doris on the CBS soap opera As the World Turns in 1990, she had a recurring role. She was then cast as Molly Carter on the CBS soap opera The Young and the Restless. The character was the mother of Sheila Carter (Kimberlin Brown). In 1992, Sheila crossed over to The Bold and the Beautiful and Molly eventually joined her, with Alex making recurring appearances. Alex has continued to appear on The Young and the Restless, most recently in 2020.

Alex guest starred on Sex and the City in 2000. She appeared in the film Deep Blood (also titled Homecoming) in 2005. Her most recent role was in the 2011 film Paranormal Activity 3.

== Personal life ==
As of 1992, Alex was divorced. She has two children, a son and a daughter.
