= Vasili Bogazianos =

American actor

- Born: February 1, 1945 (age 81); Astoria, New York
- Years active: 1979–2012

Vasili Bogazianos (born February 1, 1945) is an American actor, best known for his role as Benny Sago #2 on the television series All My Children, which he played from 1980 to 1990.

He began his television career by playing the small role of Mickey Dials, alias Tobias, on The Edge of Night. Later, he was hired to replace actor Lawrence Fleischman in the role of Benny. He had a recurring role on Home Improvement as Antonio, a rude and sarcastic waiter at an Italian restaurant.

He has also appeared on the California-produced serial Days of Our Lives as well as The Young and the Restless and, in 2004, spent a number of months on As the World Turns in the recurring role of gym manager Bud Simpson.

He returned to All My Children for the funeral of Phoebe Wallingford (Ruth Warrick) in 2005.

== Filmography ==
Year	Title	Role	Notes
1979	...And Justice for All	Avilar	
1985	Turk 182!	Man in Ward	Uncredited
2002	The 4th Tenor	Pilot	
