= Victoria Ann Lewis =

American dramatist

- Known for: Disability theatre
- Notable work: Knots Landing

Victoria Ann Lewis is an American former theatre artist, actress, and scholar. Ann Lewis played Peggy on Knots Landing. She is the editor of Beyond Victims and Villains: Contemporary Plays by Disabled Playwrights.

== Early life ==
Ann Lewis had polio as a child, leaving her right leg weaker. As a result, she walks with a limp and uses a leg brace.

When Ann Lewis was 14, her parents enrolled her in drama school. She attended Columbia University where she pursued an MA in English literature. Ann Lewis has a Ph.D. in theatre from the University of California at Los Angeles.

== Career ==
Ann Lewis is the founder and director of Mark Taper Forum's Other Voices Project. The Other Voices Project teaches theatre to disabled people and educates the public about disability.

In 1983, Ann Lewis produced, developed and performed in Tell Them I'm a Mermaid, a televised musical theatre performance exploring the lives of seven disabled women. She later developed and performed in Who Parks in Those Spaces?, another televised special centring around disability.

From 1984 to 1993, Ann Lewis played Peggy, the secretary, on Knots Landing. In 1993, she played Edna Miles in Light Sensitive at the Old Globe Theatre.

In 1994, she originated the role of Doris Collins on the CBS daytime drama The Young and the Restless.

Ann Lewis edited Beyond Victims and Villains: Contemporary Plays by Disabled Playwrights, which was published by Theatre Communications Group in 2006. In 2010, her chapter "Disability and Access: A Manifesto for Actor Training" was published as part of The Politics of American Actor Training. She is currently an Assistant Professor of Theatre at the University of Redlands.

=== Plays ===
- Tell Them I'm a Mermaid (1983)
- Teenage Ninja Mothers
- P.H.*reaks: The Hidden History of People with Disabilities (1993) – adapted by Doris Baizley and Victoria Ann Lewis from writing by Isaac Agnew, Mary Martz, Ben Mattlin, Peggy Oliveri, Steve Pallet, Vince Pinto, John Pixley, Paul Ryan, Leslye Sneider, Bill Trzeciak and Tamara Turner
- Stuck (1998)
