= Karen Hensel =

American actress

Karen Hensel is an American former actress. She is perhaps best known for the recurring role of Doris Collins, the mother of Sharon Newman, on the American soap opera The Young and the Restless. She played Doris from 1994 to 2005, and returned to the show in 2009 to resume the role.

Hensel has guest-starred in:

- Star Trek: The Next Generation
- Star Trek: Deep Space Nine
- Murder, She Wrote
- Knots Landing
- Strong Medicine
- The Practice
- Judging Amy
- Frasier
- Mama's Family
- The Magnificent Seven television series

She also appeared in the films Chained Heat, Faith and Psycho III.
