= Noah Newman =

Fictional character from The Young and the Restless

- The Young and the Restless character
- Lucas Adams as Noah Newman
- Portrayed by: Hunter Allan (2005–2008); Kevin Schmidt (2008–2010, 2011–2012); Luke Kleintank (2010–2011); Robert Adamson (2012–2020); Rory Gibson (2021–2023); Lucas Adams (2025–present); (and child actors)
- Duration: 1997–2018; 2020–2023; 2025–present
- First appearance: March 3, 1997
- Created by: William J. Bell
- Introduced by: Edward J. Scott (1997); Josh Griffith (2008); Maria Arena Bell and Paul Rauch (2010); Jill Farren Phelps (2012); Mal Young (2018); Anthony Morina and Josh Griffith (2020); Josh Griffith and Sally McDonald (2025) (Note: Josh Griffith reintroduced the character of Noah Newman in October 2025, with an uncredited actor; however, Lucas Adams' first episode appearance occurred under the executive production of Griffith and Sally McDonald.)
- Rory Gibson as Noah Newman
In-universe information
- Other names: Noah Christian Newman
- Occupation: Business executive; Restaurant manager; Bartender; Business intern; Musician; Photographer; Socialite
- Parents: Nicholas Newman; Sharon Newman
- Sisters: Cassie Newman (adoptive); Faith Newman
- Half-brothers: Christian Newman (legal)
- Half-sisters: Mariah Copeland; Summer Newman
- Grandparents: Victor Newman; Nikki Newman; Doris Collins
- Aunts and uncles: Dylan McAvoy; Victoria Newman; John Abbott III; Adam Newman; Abby Newman
- Nephews: Harrison Abbott (adoptive)
- Nieces: Aria Porter-Copeland (adoptive)
- First cousins: Eve Nicole Howard; Reed Hellstrom; Johnny Abbott (adoptive); Connor Newman; Katie Newman; Christian Newman (legal); Dominic Abbott Newman Chancellor

Noah Newman is a fictional character from The Young and the Restless, an American soap opera on the CBS network. He is the only son of Nicholas Newman and Sharon Collins. Introduced in 1997, numerous child actors portrayed the character before being rapidly aged. Kevin Schmidt was the first actor to play Noah after being aged, appearing from 2008 to September 2010, when the role was recast with Luke Kleintank before being let go in April 2011 with Schmidt being rehired. Schmidt was again let go in 2012 and replaced by Robert Adamson, who held the role until his departure in 2018; he reprised the role twice in 2020. Rory Gibson debuted in the role in 2021 and made his last appearance in April 2023, when Noah leaves Genoa City and moves to London. The character returned in 2025, with Lucas Adams assuming the role; Noah returned during the October 15 episode, with Adams first appearing on November 4.

== Casting ==
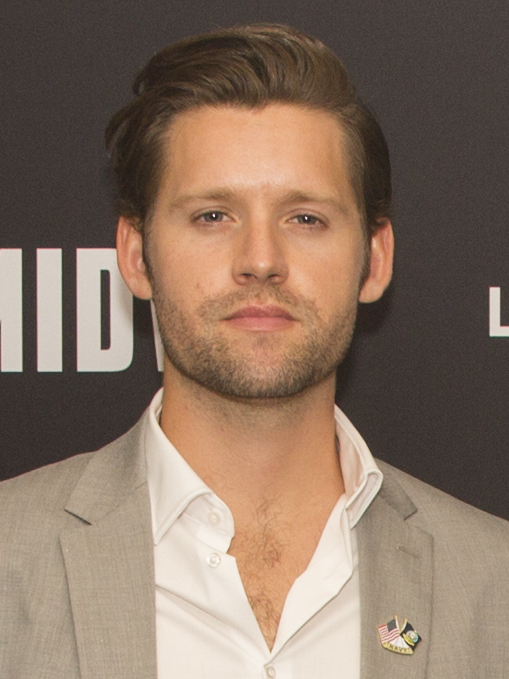
Luke Kleintank appeared in seven episodes as Noah

The role was first played as an infant by twins Samantha and Zachary Elkins in March 1997 before being replaced with Lauren Summer Harvey that same year. The character was then portrayed by Hunter Preisendorfer from the fall of 1997 to 1998 and again from 1999 to November 22, 2000. Other actors who've played the role include C.J. Hunter from 1998 to 1999, Nicholas Graziano in 1999, and Blake Michael Bryan from December 20, 2000, to June 6, 2001. McKay Giller took over the role on July 4, 2001, portraying Noah through December 7, 2004. Blake Woodruff played the role briefly from December 24, 2004, to April 27, 2005, followed by Chase Ellison from May 11 to September 20, 2005, when the role was recast with final child actor Hunter Allan from September 28, 2005, to June 9, 2008.

The character of Noah was then rapidly aged, and Kevin Schmidt was cast in the role as a teenager, making his debut on August 13, 2008. Just months later, Schmidt acquired other roles and speculation arose that the role would be recast, however, Schmidt ended up staying with the soap. In 2010, Schmidt took a leave of absence to appear on the Cartoon Network series Unnatural History. Schmidt was expected to return to the role later that summer. In July 2010, Schmidt revealed that he had not been asked to return to the soap and plans for an older recast were announced. In August 2010 Soap Opera Digest confirmed on their website that Luke Kleintank had been cast in the role of Noah. Kleintank first appeared on September 21, 2010. However, the recast was very brief and Kleintank only appeared in seven episodes; his last air date was April 8, 2011. Schmidt had previously alluded to a possible return on Facebook and returned to the role on April 14, on a recurring status. Kleintank later revealed that he chose to vacate the role to focus on other projects. In August 2012, Schmidt informed his followers on Twitter that he had been let go and revealed that the role would be recast.

Several days after Schmidt's announcement, it was announced that Robert Adamson had been placed on contract and would join the cast as Noah. He made his debut on October 1, 2012. In March 2016, it was revealed that Adamson was placed off contract and put on recurring status. In early 2018, Soap Central announced Adamson's exit from the role of Noah. He last appeared on February 16, 2018. He returned later the same year from October 4 to 10, and again from December 25 to 27. In 2020, Adamsom briefly reprised the role for a multi-episode guest stint, beginning on February 18, 2020. That August, Soaps.com reported that Adamson would again reprise the role; he returned from September 3 to 9, 2020. In August 2021, it was announced the role had been recast, with newcomer Rory Gibson debuting as Noah later that year on October 12. Scenes concerning his departure from the role aired on April 21, 2023.

In September 2025, it was announced Lucas Adams had been recast in the role. Adams previously appeared on the soap in 2012 as a day-player, Wesley. He made his first episodic appearance on November 4, 2025.

== Development ==
=== Adolescence ===
Most of Noah's storylines as a teenager and young adult revolve around his reactions to his parents' decisions in life. With the casting of Schmidt as Noah, the character develops into a catalyst for bigger storylines. Noah begins to take more of an interest in what his parents and stepparents are doing. When Schimdt was cast, he told Soap Opera Digest that although his television parents (Joshua Morrow and Sharon Case) are relatively young, "Joshua has kids of his own and Sharon definitely has a maternal instinct, so we play well off of each other." He said that he was excited Noah is "back from camp and ready to do things on his own". Schmidt noted "the younger Noah definitely gave me a good base to build from. It's my job to explore his familial relationships from the perspective of a teenager". Noah goes on to question whether his stepfather Jack Abbott (Peter Bergman) is treating Sharon right, and if she really is in love with him; these were questions that "a younger Noah wouldn't be able to question". Following Noah's aging, he becomes involved with Eden Baldwin (Vanessa Marano), his first love interest; prior to this, Schmidt said that he would like to play Noah with a love interest. However, Noah and Eden's relationship is immediately met with disapproval from their families. They eventually get their families to accept the relationship, only to face another obstacle when Daisy Callahan (Yvonne Zima) sets out to frame Eden for several crimes in Genoa City. To get away, the couple rushes off to Paris.

=== Adulthood ===
Upon Kleintank's introduction as a young adult Noah, the character reveals that he and Eden have ended their relationship. Noah finally gets a chance to bond with younger sister, Faith and his stepmother, Phyllis Newman (Michelle Stafford). In the meantime, the character also launches a short-lived music career and enters into a brief romance with Jana Hawkes (Emily O'Brien).

In 2012, when Adamson stepped into the role, Noah becomes more outspoken about his parents behavior. According to Adamson, "Noah will be giving his parents more of a hard time, while figuring out who he is." Adamson observed that Noah is a guy "who has transitioned into being a man" and "is recognizing the difficult position he was given as a kid. He's a middle man, a kid who's learned to be deflective and you may see some self-righteousness" in his attitude toward his parents, realizing his mistakes "are not nearly as bad" as theirs. Adamson's first major storyline as Noah starts very subtly. Luke Kerr noted that Noah seemed to be hiding something because of his mysterious and vague phone calls. This led to the introduction of New York City police detective, Alex Chavez portrayed by Adamson's former Lincoln Heights costar, Ignacio Serricchio. Chavez demands information from Noah about his ex-girlfriend, Adriana Stone. As Noah denies having contact with her, the series introduced Jhoanna Flores as Adriana. As of April 5, 2013, Noah was stated to be 23 years old. Noah begins Genoa City Police Officer Courtney Sloane (Kelli Goss). Adamson viewed Courtney as marking Noah's first "strong relationship", saying: "His past relationship with Adriana, it was all trouble all around. So he sees this as a grown up relationship." Courtney is later murdered as part of a killer storyline in 2015, on the day she and Noah were planning to marry.

=== Recasts ===
Ahead of his November 4, 2025, debut, Adams spoke to TV Insider about his take on the role, describing his Noah as a more mature take on the character; he further described Noah as a "good kid and has a great heart, and I think that he's always trying to do the best for everyone around him. His parents are very protective of their family, and I think he's a very similar person."

== Storylines ==
Insecure about her new marriage, Sharon Collins Newman stops taking birth control unbeknownst to husband, Nicholas Newman. Sharon convinces Nick that the pregnancy is accidental and he wants her to get an abortion; however, at the last minute, she changes her mind. Sharon later falls and gives birth to a premature baby boy, Noah Christian. When it appears that Noah may die, Sharon's best friend, Grace Turner and her boyfriend, Tony Viscardi track down Cassie, the child Sharon gave up in high school to help ease her pain. Noah lives, and Nicholas eventually adopts Cassie.

In 2005, a 14-year-old Cassie dies from injuries after a drunken car accident with Daniel Romalotti. Noah put Cassie's doll, "Cindy", on her casket at her funeral. Following Cassie's death, a devastated Noah begins acting out, while his parents are torn apart. Noah becomes a big brother with the birth of half-sister Summer when his father has an affair with Daniel's mother, Phyllis Summers. An angry Noah is sent to therapy and Nick and Phyllis buy him a puppy called "Fisher" to stop him from acting out. Sharon then marries Jack Abbott while Nick is presumed dead in a plane crash and Phyllis lands herself in prison. Sharon sends Noah back to therapy after he locks Fisher in a closet for being bad. In August 2008, a now 15-year-old Noah begins getting into a lot of trouble, when he attends wild parties, gets into fights, lies to his parents and starts dating Eden Baldwin. Noah and Eden lie to Phyllis and Eden's brother, Michael Baldwin about their relationship and continue seeing one another in secret. Noah and Eden go ice skating on a frozen lake during a blizzard when he falls through the ice. Noah is rescued by Brad Carlton who drowns after saving him. Later, Noah and Eden lose their virginity to one another and later begin dating officially. Noah is also forced to deal with kids teasing him due to Sharon's kleptomania. When Sharon and Nick reunite, Noah wants to emancipate himself from them, believing their reunion will only end in heartache. Noah and Sharon briefly move into Brad Carlton's mansion until Daisy Carter attempts to kill Eden by starting a fire. Victor's wife, Ashley Abbott, then invites them to live at the Newman Ranch. In early 2010, Noah and Eden leave town for Paris to visit her long-lost relatives.

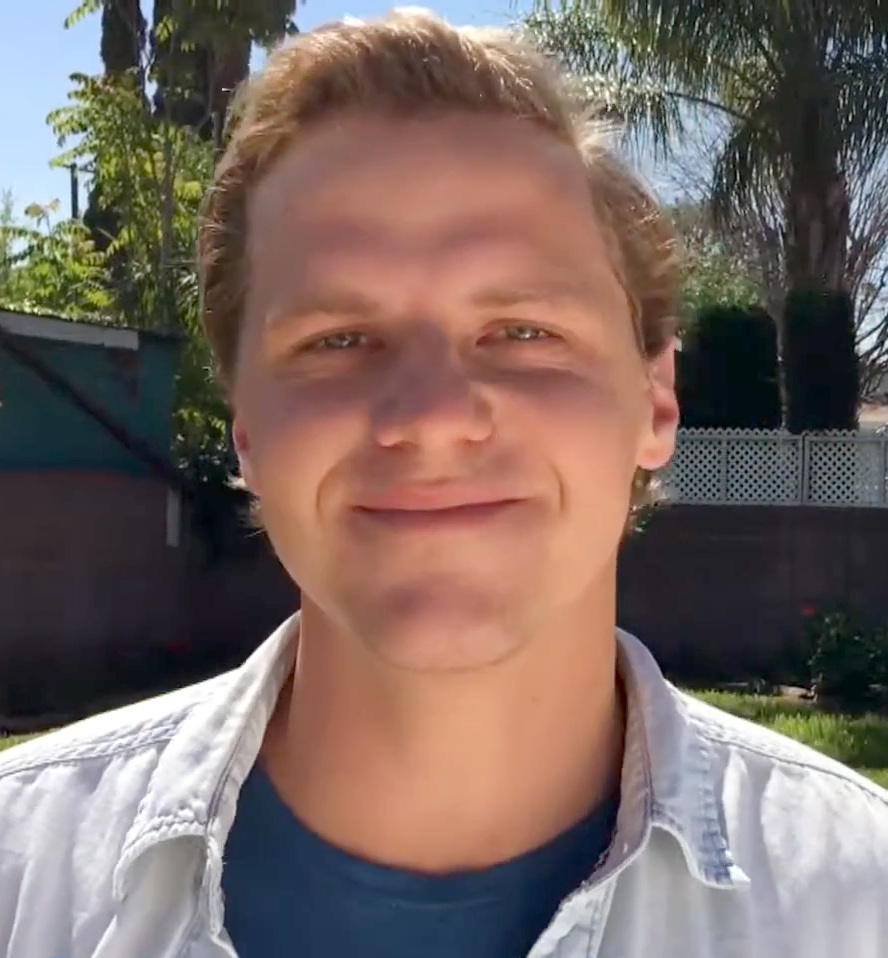
Kevin Schmidt was cast as Noah in 2008 when the role of rapidly aged.

A now-adult Noah returned in September 2010, revealing that he and Eden have broken up. Because both his parents are single, Noah realizes it is only a matter of time before they reunite. Noah later pursues the recently divorced Jana Hawkes and also reveals his new passion for music. After Jana rejects his sexual advances, he realizes she is still in love with her ex, Kevin Fisher, and he subsequently leaves town. Noah returns home in April 2011 when a fugitive Sharon is presumed dead and moves into his mom's house. Sharon is revealed to be alive and the murder charges she is running from are dropped. Noah returns to New York City for work and returns months later to find out Sharon and Victor are dating. Noah briefly moves back in with Eden until he returns to New York.

In October 2012, Noah returns home when Victor is presumed dead and he is upset with Sharon for not inviting him to the funeral. He also helps celebrate his little sister Faith's birthday. Noah later takes a job as the bartender at the athletic club. Noah becomes very protective of Sharon when she is diagnosed with bipolar disorder. He tries to convince her to reach out to Nick while keeping Adam at arm's length, believing his mother's dependency on him is unhealthy. Noah gets a bag of money from his ex, Adriana Stone, and must hide it. He tries to contact her, but he is unable to contact her. In December 2012, Noah contemplates leaving town, but stays to support his mom and later receives huge amount of cash from his ex-girlfriend. Meanwhile, he is confronted by New York Detective Alex Chavez, who is looking for Adriana. Adriana arrives and thanks Noah for hiding the money. His family immediately disapproves of Adriana, thinking she is trouble. The money is stolen, and their reunion is short-lived as Adriana steals the money back and leaves town. Noah befriends Tyler Michaelson (Redaric Williams), who gets him a job as a photographer's assistant as Jabot Cosmetics; they later get an apartment together. Noah eventually begins dating Summer's best friend, Courtney Sloan, as he settles into his new job working for Victor. Noah is uneasy when Victor hires Jack's son, Kyle Abbott (Hartley Sawyer).

In 2014, Noah finds out that he has another half-sister, Mariah Copeland (also Grimes). In 2017, Noah begins a relationship with Tessa Porter, but it breaks down and Mariah falls in love with her. Noah leaves town the following year but returns for their parents wedding, which does not go ahead. Noah criticizes his parents for their behavior but also gives Mariah his blessing to be with Tessa. Noah returns for two visits in 2020, before returning the following year, where he reveals that he is still in love with Tessa. Despite this, he helps organize Tessa and Mariah's wedding.

== Reception ==
Michael Fairman of On-Air On-Soaps applauded Luke Kleintank's casting describing the actor as a "younger Joshua Morrow-type." Fairman said that Kleintank would bring a very different vibe compared to Kevin Schmidt's portrayal. Upon Kleintank's departure, he encouraged Schmidt on his return and said "Kevin should do great." Schmidt was very upset following his 2012 ousting and even sent a direct message to Y&R's Twitter page saying, "How many times you gonna try and bring in a "New Noah"? There's only one!" and he apologized for the fans who watched for him. Prior to Adamson's casting, Jamey Giddens of Zap2it's Daytime Confidential did a "Wishful Casting" and recommended Adamson as a recast of Noah. Giddens said that Adamson would fit the role very well. Giddens described Adamson as being a "doppelganger" for Joshua Morrow. Soap Opera Digest responded to the news of Adamson's casting, saying that it happened rather quickly. "Majorly awesome news!" Giddens said in the response to the official announcement. In addition to his looks, Giddens believed that Adamson would bring "a much-needed edge and sex appeal" to the character. Michael Fairman said, "Adamson certainly has the looks to be Nick and Sharon’s son!"

Omar Nobles of TVSource acknowledged that prior to Adamson's casting, Noah was not a major factor in storylines, and hoped that it would change under the new executive producer and head-writer. Nobles explained that while he was sad to see Schmidt go, he was "thrilled" with the casting news and explained the storyline potential that the recast provided. The casting news did not come as a shock due to the recently hired executive producer and head-writer, Jill Farren Phelps and Josh Griffith working on the primetime teen soap, Hollywood Heights which Adamson also appeared on. The news led to speculation that Adamson would be followed by several more Hollywood Heights alumni. However, the speculation turned out to be true when Adamson's former costar, Hunter King stepped into the role of Summer Newman, Noah's half-sister. Jamey Giddens pointed out how weird it would be for Adamson and King who had previously portrayed one another's love interest on Hollywood Heights to now play siblings. Adamson ranked at No. 5 on Daytime Confidential's list of the "Top 5 Soap Opera Newcomers of 2012." Adamson was also listed as the Best Male Newcomer of 2012 by On-Air On-Soaps; "Noah’s come and Noah’s go, we think this one will stick! Handsome, charming and he can act" said Michael Fairman.

In 2022, Charlie Mason and Richard Simms from Soaps She Knows criticised Noah's storylines after being recast with Gibson, saying "Young & Restless recast Noah with the appealing Rory Gibson, only to turn the legacy character into a sad sack obsessing over an ex who was never all that into him in the first place. Why? Fortunately, Noah would eventually find a new lady over whom to moon in Allie."
