= Zuleyka Silver =

Mexican-American model and actress (born 1991)

- Born: August 2, 1991 (age 35); Tijuana, Baja California, Mexico
- Citizenship: Mexico, United States
- Occupations: Actress; fashion model; beauty pageant contestant
- Years active: 2009–present

Zuleyka Silver (born August 2, 1991) is a Mexican and American actress and former fashion model. She was the seventh runner-up on Univision's Nuestra Belleza Latina 2013. Her film and television work started in 2010, primarily in the United States.

== Early life ==
Silver was born in Tijuana, Baja California, Mexico.

== Career ==
Commencing her acting career by appearing in the American television film The Strip (2010), Silver has appeared in single episodes of American television series, such as 90210, Big Time Rush, Touch, CSI: Crime Scene Investigation, and The Bold and the Beautiful.

She portrayed Anna in the Canadian horror thriller film Girl House. She also played the role of Daniela Welker in a three-episode arc on the TV series The Mentalist.

In 2016, she appeared in one episode of the American TV series Code Black playing the role of Kamilla. In 2016, she appeared in one episode of the American TV series Hawaii Five-0 playing the role of Isabel. In 2017, she appeared in the episode "Potato Salad, a Broomstick, and Dad’s Whiskey" of the American TV series Young Sheldon playing the role of Selena.

In August 2022, it was announced that Silver has joined the cast of CBS’ The Young and the Restless as high-powered executive Audra Charles who's lured to town by one of Genoa City's business icons. She first appeared on the soap in September 22, 2022, in a recurring role that is ongoing as of 2025.

== Filmography ==
=== Film ===
Year	Title	Role	Notes
2011	In Time	Pasha	
2012	Up or Down?	Samantha	Short film
2013	Cavemen	Alicia	
2014	Girl House	Anna	
2015	Gerardo Ortiz: Como un Sueño	Gerardo's Girlfriend	
2016	Barrio Tales 2	Marisol	
2017	The Lay of LaLa Land	Betty Anne	
2021	Estilo Americano	Veronica	Short film

=== Television ===
Year	Title	Role	Notes
2009	Model Latina	Contestant (Season 2)	10 episodes
2010	90210	Beautiful Waitress	Episode: "They're Playing Her Song"
2010	The Strip	Maria	Television film
2011	Big Time Rush	Tiffany	Episode: "Big Time Contest"
2012	Blue Eyed Butcher	Maria	Television film
2012	Touch	Marisol Flores	Episode: "Entanglement"
2012	CSI: Crime Scene Investigation	Elena Punto	Episode: "Wild Flowers"
2013	The Bold and the Beautiful	Model	Episode #1.6558
2013	Nuestra Belleza Latina 2013	Contestant (Season 7)	9 episodes
2014	The Mentalist	Daniela Welker	3 episodes
2015–2021	Jimmy Kimmel Live!	Mrs. Guillermo / Monica	8 episodes
2016	Code Black	Kamilla	Episode: "First Date"
2016	Hawaii Five-0	Isabel Ortega	Episode: "Ka Haunaele"
2016	Real Husbands of Hollywood	Maria	Episode: "The Suitor"
2018, 2019	Young Sheldon	Selena	2 episodes
2019	Too Old to Die Young	Lolita	Episode: "Volume 9: The Empress"
2021	9-1-1	Nora Perez	Episode: "Suspisious"
2022–present	The Young and the Restless	Audra Charles	Recurring contract role
