= List of The Young and the Restless characters introduced in 2011 =

The Young and the Restless is an American television soap opera. It was first broadcast on March 26, 1973, and airs on CBS. The following is a list of characters that first appeared in 2011, by order of appearance. All characters were introduced to the series by its head writer that year, Maria Arena Bell. Lucy Romalotti, Primrose DeVille and Caleb Atkinson all debuted in January, while Angelo Veneziano first appeared in February. Davis Holloway debuted in July while Moses Winters debuted in October.

== Lucy Romalotti ==
Lucy Romalotti
- The Young and the Restless character
- Portrayed by: James, Monte & Viviana (2011); Abigail and Olivia Moore (2012–2013); Lily Brooks O'Briant (2023–present)
- Duration: 2011–2013; 2023–2024; since 2026
- First appearance: January 3, 2011
- Created by: Maria Arena Bell, Hogan Sheffer and Scott Hamner
- Introduced by: Maria Arena Bell and Paul Rauch (2011); Josh Griffith (2023); Sally McDonald (2026)
In-universe information
- Other names: Lucy Nicole Romalotti; Lucy Abbott; Lucy Summers; Lucy Carter
- Father: Daniel Romalotti
- Mother: Daisy Carter
- Adoptive mother: Heather Stevens
- Grandfathers: Brian Hamilton; Tom Fisher; Danny Romalotti (legal); Paul Williams (adoptive)
- Grandmothers: Phyllis Summers; Sheila Carter; April Stevens (adoptive)
- Uncles: Kevin Fisher; Ryder Callahan; John Finnegan; Ricky Williams (adoptive); Dylan McAvoy (adoptive)
- Aunts: Summer Newman; Mary Carter Warwick; Diana Carter
- First cousins: Bella Fisher; Miles Fisher; Luna Nozawa; Hayes Finnegan; Harrison Abbott (adoptive)

Lucy Romalotti is the daughter of Daniel Romalotti and Daisy Carter. Lucy was born January 1, 2011. She was illegally adopted by Billy Abbott and was raised with him and his wife, Victoria Newman, who became emotionally attached to her. She was in the care of Daniel's mother, Phyllis Summers, who wanted control of her for her own (as she believed the child should be with her grandmother, [Phyllis] if not Daniel). The loss of Lucy to Phyllis affected Victoria and Billy's marriage. However, Lucy resided briefly with her biological mother Daisy after she was released from prison in February 2012. Currently, Lucy resides with Daniel as Daisy mysteriously disappeared.

Daisy became pregnant after drugging Daniel and raping his unconscious body in May 2010. Daniel, in his drugged state, thought he was having sex with his wife, Amber Moore. Daisy left town afterward but returned on October 31, 2010. Daisy showed up at Daniel's apartment and told him that she was pregnant with his child. A paternity test was taken and revealed Daniel to be the father of the child. In December 2010, Daisy was put into the custody of Daniel's mother, Phyllis Newman, for the remainder of her pregnancy. Afterward, she would be returned to the Genoa City Jail. Daisy was also allowed to stay at Daniel's apartment. Jana Hawkes Fisher let Daisy escape there, and she took off in Jana's van.

Daniel went to search for Daisy himself after she never showed up to the hospital to give birth, and he found Daisy’s abandoned ankle monitor. Meanwhile, Daisy’s labor intensified, she was found parked at the side of the road, and Daniel delivered their unnamed daughter. Daisy, still insanely, convinced Daniel loves her, begs him to stay with her. Daniel, however, wants nothing to do with her. She knocks him out and runs away with the baby. Daisy left her baby in a church, and a couple found her and sold her to a black market dealer, Primrose. After Billy and Victoria Abbott found out that Victoria cannot have any more children, Billy bought Daisy's baby from Primrose for $2 million. Billy told Victoria that they were "adopting" the baby, who they named Lucy after the popular TV show, I Love Lucy. The adoption never went before the courts; therefore, it was not a valid adoption. On June 7, 2011, Billy and Victoria's adoption of Lucy was made official with the courts, but Daisy arrived back in town. Daisy made a deal with Phyllis to turn herself in for her crimes so Phyllis could petition the courts to have her parental rights reinstated. After Daisy won custody, Victoria and Billy handed Lucy over to her biological mother. But since she was incarcerated, Daisy gave Lucy to her biological grandmother, Phyllis, where she currently resides, leaving Billy and Victoria heartbroken. Lucy was seen on screen for the first time in several weeks on September 6, 2011. Phyllis was with her and her babysitter at Crimson Lights. Later, Phyllis asked Jack if he thought that it was okay if Lucy called her "mommy". Lucy appeared once again on September 23, 2011 with Phyllis at Crimson Lights. The nanny had cancelled so Phyllis had to watch Lucy herself.

Shockingly, despite Daisy's criminal history, the courts give Lucy freely to Daisy without trying to test Daisy through parenting classes or let Lucy into either her grandmother's custody or foster care. Fearing for Lucy's safety, Daniel marries Daisy. Daniel was constantly unhappy with having to live with Daisy and was enraged at her attempts to make them into a real family. With Daisy's apparent murder at the hands of psychotic Ricky Williams, however, Daniel has shown regret for Daisy's death because Lucy will have to grow up without her mother. Daisy later turned out to still be alive, hiding in a mental institution from Ricky under an alias. A woman claiming to be Sheila Carter, Daisy's mother, checked her out of the institution. Daisy never came back to Daniel and Lucy.

A now teenage Lucy returns to Genoa City in February 2023.

== Primrose DeVille ==
Primrose DeVille
- The Young and the Restless character
- Portrayed by: Ellen Greene
- First appearance: January 7, 2011
- Last appearance: April 1, 2011
- Introduced by: Maria Arena Bell
In-universe information
- Occupation: Illegal child trafficker
- Aunts: Rose DeVille

Primrose DeVille first appeared as a guest from January 7 to 14, 2011, and returned again briefly that March and April. She was portrayed by actress Ellen Greene. Her casting was announced on November 19, 2010. She provides Billy Abbott with a child illegally.

Greene is known for her roles in Little Shop of Horrors and Pushing Daisies. Of her casting as the guest role, Green stated "My agents got the call from Y&R and really liked the role and the whole idea. They said, "Ellen, you should do this." But I was too afraid. Soaps move so fast and I'm a snob." She initially didn't want to work on any Soap due to a bad experience playing a nurse years ago. In the same interview with TV Guide she said about the script and storyline "I read the script. It was so good I was shocked. I just had to do it. I can only tell you this much: Primrose will bring happiness into Billy's life." Greene enjoyed working with Billy Miller (Billy Abbott) also. Prior to her appearance, Primrose's situation/character was described as "a gal who represents a surprising link to the past that brings unexpected joy to Billy and Victoria." She appeared for just 5 episodes in January, and returned in March for another 5-episode stint and departed on April 1.

Primrose is the niece of the late black market baby racketeer, Rose DeVille, a notorious woman who once stole the first baby of Nina Webster. Primrose arrived in the picture as Billy Abbott began looking into illegal adoption shortly after he and his wife Victoria got word from their doctor that it would be near impossible for them to conceive a child together. It appeared that Primrose took over the business of her dead aunt as she willing handed over a newborn to Billy, which she got by a money troubled couple. Fugitive Daisy Carter abandoned her daughter with Daniel Romalotti in a safe house, and the couple that found the baby sold her to Primrose. She gave Billy the baby girl after he wired two million dollars for the price of happiness on January 14, 2011. Billy welcomed his new daughter together with Victoria and they name her Lucy Abbott; they did not know that their daughter was the biological daughter of Daniel and Daisy, daughter of psychotic Sheila Carter. Primrose later discovered that Stella, who was really Jana Hawkes in disguise, was faking a pregnancy to gain information about one of her baby deals. After confronting Jana, Primrose left town to avoid a scandal.

== Caleb Atkinson ==
Caleb Atkinson
- The Young and the Restless character
- Portrayed by: Daniel Goddard
- First appearance: January 2011
- Last appearance: February 3, 2011
- Introduced by: Maria Arena Bell
In-universe information
- Occupation: Mobster
- Father: Colin Atkinson
- Mother: Genevieve Atkinson
- Brothers: Cane Ashby
- Sisters: Samantha Atkinson
- Nephews: Charlie Ashby; Sam Ashby
- Nieces: Matilda Ashby

Caleb Atkinson first appeared in January 2011 as the son of Colin and Genevieve Atkinson, and Cane Ashby's identical twin brother, who is shot dead, thought to be Cane at the time of the shooting. Subsequently, most of the revelation that Cane was alive and that Caleb was the person that died occurred only in May 2011, months after Caleb's death, meaning the character had no legitimate airtime. The "visions" that Lily Winters (Christel Khalil) had been experiencing were declared real, and for a short amount of time viewers were led to believe that it was Caleb posing as Cane. However once Caleb was the one to be revealed dead after the shooting, the storyline finally seemed clear.

Lynette Rice praised the show for giving fans closure after their outrage due to Cane's "death" (Goddard's exit) she stated: "Confusing? Heck, yeah. But it should ultimately be good news for fans who were outraged at the Y&R writers for offing the beloved character in the first place." Goddard said during an interview with EW.com "I was completely overwhelmed by the fans and all the things they did, all the love and support. I really appreciate my fan base and I love them very much."

Caleb was born along with his twin brother Ethan "Cane" Atkinson, known generally as Cane Ashby. Caleb and Cane also had a sister, Samantha Atkinson. Caleb played a key role in her tragic death. Apparently, Caleb came to Genoa City in January 2011 to help his father in his efforts to bring Cane back to Australia. The night Colin married Jill Abbott, Caleb was shot and killed, having been mistaken for his brother Cane, who wanted to stop the wedding. After Caleb's death, it was believed that Cane had died. Even his father believed that it was Cane. However, Cane began secretly working with his mother, Genevieve, in a scheme to stop Colin, who now wanted Cane's children, Charlie and Matilda. The night Colin implemented his plan to steal the children, he learned the devastating truth that Caleb had died, and not Cane. For Cane, now going public with the truth, it proved to be much harder to convince his wife, Lily Winters, that it was really him and not his brother. However, Lily eventually faced the truth and forgave Cane for his tactics against her in his scheme to play as Caleb as a part of his plan with his mother.

== Angelo Veneziano ==
Angelo Veneziano
- The Young and the Restless character
- Portrayed by: Mike Starr
- Duration: 2011–12
- First appearance: February 11, 2011
- Last appearance: February 22, 2012
- Introduced by: Maria Arena Bell
In-universe information
- Occupation: Crime Boss
- Daughters: Angelina Veneziano

Angelo Veneziano first appeared on February 11, 2011, originated by Mike Starr. He is the father of Angelina Veneziano and is the ex-fiance of Gloria Abbott Bardwell. Initially, Angelo was a guest role from February 11 to 14, 2011, and returned months later to escort Gloria to Victoria Abbott's Halloween Party. Angelo later began to help out at Gloria's restaurant, Gloworm, due to her hard money situation. In later episodes, Angelo and Gloria requested Devon Hamilton's help with Angelo's daughter, Angelina, with her "new-found singing talent." However, everyone but Angelo and Angelina realized that she had no talent whatsoever. Angelo forced Kevin Fisher to babysit Angelina and keep her away from her ex-boyfriend, Carmine. He also agreed to pay for Kevin and his fiancee's, Chloe Mitchell, new home if they let Angelina sing at their wedding.

It was revealed later that Angelo had chased Gloria's husband, Jeffery to far away to have Gloria to himself, which paid off as they are now officially a couple. He also proves to be a major problem for Kevin, who later marries Angelina, but realizing that he deserves better, she agrees to have their marriage annulled. Angelo's attempts to marry Gloria are dashed by Jeffrey, who crashes the ceremony and tells Gloria that not only did Angelo kidnap him, but Angelo was the one who stole her money. Afterward Gloria agrees to remarry Jeffrey instead, and Angelo and Angelina decide to leave town for Los Angeles to focus on Angelina's singing career.

In 2012, writers from Soaps She Knows placed Angelina and Angelo as the worst characters of the soap of that year, writing that the characters "never fit the "Y&R" canvas and seemed like over-the-top cartoon characters compared to those they interacted with in their storylines."

== Piper Welch ==
Piper Welch
- The Young and the Restless character
- Portrayed by: Ellery Sprayberry
- Duration: 2011
- First appearance: April 29, 2011
- Last appearance: November 4, 2011
- Introduced by: Maria Arena Bell
In-universe information
- Occupation: Elementary student
- Father: Lee Welch
- Mother: Beverly Sheffield

Piper Welch first appeared on April 29, 2011 and is portrayed by young actress Ellery Sprayberry for a total of seventeen episodes. Piper is the daughter of Lee Welch (Matthew John Armstrong) and Beverly Sheffield.

Piper is an eleven-year-old girl who lives on a farm in New Mexico. She is shy and friends with her neighbor, Sam Gibson (Sean Patrick Flanery), who is a widowed veterinarian. Sharon Newman (Sharon Case) poses under a fake identity, Sheri Coleman, and goes on the run after being sentenced to life for a crime she didn't commit. 'Sheri' ends up in New Mexico at Sam's farm. Piper, who loves playing with the animals at Sam's barn, develops a friendship with Sheri. Sharon Case called the relationship with Piper, Sam and Sheri "really beautiful".

At first, Piper didn't like Sheri, but warmed up to her. Piper's father Lee is a Sheriff in Mexico. Her mother, Beverly Sheffield, is also grateful towards Sheri for being friends with Piper who was shy and didn't have many friends. Piper and Sam convinced Sheri, who didn't want to go outside afraid of being captured. Eventually, Sheri went to a local annual dance with Sam and Piper. There, Piper's father Lee arrested Sharon and took her back to Genoa City, where everyone thought she was dead. Piper was devastated. Sharon was eventually freed and returned to New Mexico to visit Sam and Piper with her daughter Faith Newman (Alyvia Alyn Lind), under her real identity. Piper was last seen on November 4, 2011, along with Sam.

== Davis Holloway ==
Davis Holloway first appeared on July 5, 2011 as a board member of Newman Enterprises. The role is portrayed by Alex Straggs on a recurring basis. Davis Holloway first appeared as a member of the Newman Enterprises' board of directors, and has appeared on and off at board meetings. Genevieve Atkinson made a deal with Holloway, who worked for her holding company, FMN, for the information that she sought, eventually helping her acquire Beauty of Nature. He then made minor appearances regarding Genevieve and Beauty of Nature. It was later revealed that when Genevieve lost all of her financial assets, Davis took control of both FMN and Genevieve's Newman shares.

== Moses Winters ==
Moses Winters
- The Young and the Restless character
- Portrayed by: Phoenix and Zion Collins (2011–2013); Uncredited actor (2013); Randall L. Smith (2014); Dax Randall (2016–2019); Jacob Aaron Gaines (2021–2022)
- Duration: 2011–2014; 2016; 2019; 2021–2022
- First appearance: October 11, 2011
- Last appearance: May 18, 2022
- Created by: Maria Arena Bell, Hogan Sheffer and Scott Hamner
- Introduced by: Maria Arena Bell (2011); Mal Young and Charles Pratt, Jr. (2016); Anthony Morina and Josh Griffith (2019, 2021)
In-universe information
- Family: Winters
- Father: Neil Winters
- Mother: Sofia Dupre
- Half-brothers: Devon Hamilton (adoptive)
- Half-sisters: Lily Winters (legal)
- Grandfathers: Ellis Winters; Moses Dupre
- Grandmothers: Lucinda Winters
- Uncles: Malcolm Winters
- Nephews: Charlie Ashby (legal); Dominic Abbott Newman Winters Chancellor (adoptive)
- Nieces: Mattie Ashby (legal)
- First cousins: Lily Winters; Nathan Hastings, Jr. (adoptive); Holden Novak

Moses Dupre Winters is the son of Sofia Dupre and Neil Winters. He was born onscreen on October 11, 2011. At the time of his birth, it was unknown if Neil or his brother and Sofia's husband at the time, Malcolm Winters, was his father. In 2021, the role was rapidly aged with the casting of Jacob Aaron Gaines; he made his first appearance on April 1. He last appeared in the role in May 2022.

On October 14, 2011, the paternity test showed that Neil was Moses' father, causing Malcolm to leave Genoa City permanently. On October 19 Sofia and Moses went home from the hospital with Neil to stay at his home. Neil and Sofia planned a christening ceremony for Moses, with Tucker McCall as his godfather and Olivia Winters as his godmother. At first, Neil was upset that Sofia chose Tucker to be Moses' godfather, being that Genoa City was just rocked with the news that Tucker was the biological father of Neil's adopted son, Devon Hamilton. Still, Neil didn't want to fight with Sofia, and he allowed her to choose Tucker as the godfather.

In November 2011, Moses is christened, and on the same day, Neil suggested to Sophia that they get married so that they raise Moses the proper way. They marry later in December but divorced a few months later as Neil had feelings for Harmony Hamilton.

== Other appearances ==
Duration (from 2011)	Character	Actor	Notes	Source
March 16 – 21	Detective Sid Meeks	Kevin McCorkle		
March 16	Judge	Andy Umberger		
March 16	Defense Attorney Grammer	David Gautreaux		
March 16–21	Koaa	Peter Navy Tuiasosopo		
March 22–24	Kent	Jonas Fisch		
March 22	Gossip Reporter	Lauren Sanchez	Returning Role	
March 24 – December 15	Reverend Fulton	David Wells		
March 24	Martin	David Lipper		
March 24	Agnes	Melissa Hayden		
August 30	Amy	Pamela Des Barres		
September 1–2	Jodi Wing	Brittany Ishibashi		
September 6–7	Dr. Larson	Meera Simhan		
September 6–22	Judge Morrison	Tim Russ		
September 23	Jade	Tara Platt	A prisoner who picks a fight with Sharon Newman (Sharon Case)	
September 27	Madame Estelle Chauvina	Mary Anne McGarry		
September 27	Dr. White	Jade Carter		
October 3–5	Mitchell Sherman	William Wintersole		
October 4–6	Dr. Felix	Marcus Giamatti		
October 7	Bud	Eddie Mekka	The owner of a diner	
November 15–16	Guy	Christopher Cho		
November 15–16	Myanmarian Official	Tohoru Masamune		
November 15–17	Tank	Matthew Willig		
December 7	Reporter	Terri Seymour	Actor is correspondent for the nationally syndicated television show Extra.	
December 7–16	Judge Click	Rebecca Wisocky	Appeared on December 7 and 8, and again on 16.	
December 9	Detective Mauro	Erica Gimpel		
December 23	Guardian Angel	Missy Yager	Appeared as Nikki Newman (Melody Thomas Scott)'s Guardian Angel	
