= Cane Ashby =

Fictional character from The Young and the Restless

- The Young and the Restless character
- Billy Flynn as Cane Ashby
- Portrayed by: Daniel Goddard (2007–2019); Billy Flynn (2025–present)
- Duration: 2007–2019, 2025–present
- First appearance: January 12, 2007
- Created by: Lynn Marie Latham and Scott Hamner
- Introduced by: Lynn Marie Latham and Josh Griffith (2007); Josh Griffith (2025)
In-universe information
- Other names: Ethan Montgomery; Phillip Chancellor III; Caleb Atkinson; Ethan Atkinson; Aristotle Dumas (2025–present)
- Occupation: Businessman
- Parents: Colin Atkinson; Genevieve Atkinson
- Siblings: Caleb Atkinson; Samantha Atkinson
- Spouse: Amber Moore (2007); Chloe Mitchell (2008–2009); Lily Winters (2009–2019) (Note: Cane and Lily were married twice; their first marriage lasted from 2009 to 2011, and their second lasted from 2012 to 2019. Both marriages ended in divorce.)
- Children: Mattie Ashby; Charlie Ashby; Samuel Ashby

Cane Ashby is a fictional character from The Young and the Restless, an American soap opera on the CBS network, portrayed by Billy Flynn. Created by head writers Lynn Marie Latham and Scott Hamner, Cane was introduced in January 2007, portrayed by Daniel Goddard. Latham created Cane as the son of Phillip Chancellor II (Donnelly Rhodes) and Jill Abbott (Jess Walton); the character's background was rewritten by Latham's successor Maria Arena Bell in 2009, re-establishing him as the son of Colin and Genevieve Atkinson (Tristan Rogers and Genie Francis).

Though characterized as "mysterious", Cane is "loyal and dedicated", while Goddard described the character as a "typical Australian, working-class kind of guy". He was the first member of the Atkinson family to appear on the series, followed by his parents and identical twin brother. Soon after his debut, he became a leading character, a decision praised by viewers and critics. The character has been involved with Amber Moore (Adrienne Frantz), Chloe Mitchell (Elizabeth Hendrickson), and most notably Lily Winters (Christel Khalil), a romance that garnered significant fan attention. In 2009, Cane and Lily were married; Global BC would later call Lily the love of Cane's life. The pair had two children, Charlie and Mattie Ashby.

Goddard was fired in 2011; following a viewer campaign for his rehiring, Goddard returned to the role that same year. In 2019, he exited the role. In 2025, the character was reintroduced by Josh Griffith under the pseudonym of Aristotle Dumas, with Flynn assuming the role.

== Casting and creation ==
Goddard auditioned for Brad Snyder on As the World Turns and, though he was not cast in the part, Barbara Bloom, the senior vice-president of CBS Daytime, recommended Goddard to The Young and the Restless' head writer and executive producer, Lynn Marie Latham. After testing for the character of Cane for Latham and casting director Karen Rea, Goddard received the role. The Australian actor auditioned with an American accent, but when the writers found out about his Australian background, that influenced Cane's backstory. The actor stated that, "The concept of Cane was that he was given away at birth. So he could have been from Mongolia. It just worked out luckily for me that I was the right person for the job." Since the producers could not understand the actor's real Australian accent, Goddard "Americanized" it while portraying the character.

In October 2019, Goddard announced his exit from the role. In a post on social media, he cited his disappointment over the exit, and noted he was "shocked and gutted" by the decision; Cane exited on November 26 of the same year. In March 2025, Billy Flynn's casting was announced; he made his first appearance on June 19.

== Development ==
=== Characterization ===
The writers first detailed Cane as "a smart, loyal, and moral survivalist with an edge". Goddard describes Cane as a "typical Australian, working-class kind of guy who mined opals, raised goats, then went off for travel and adventure to sort of find himself". Global BC penned Cane as "mysterious". SoapNet described Cane as a "pretty stand-up guy", as well as "loyal and dedicated to the people he cares about". The network said his time in Genoa City has "made him a good man". In an interview with On-Air On-Soaps, Goddard said that Cane working at Jabot Cosmetics is "very enthusiastic and cautious about falling into a family business which is an Abbott company", and that he is "very sensitive about that". He also stated that Cane "has no fears in doing business with anybody" because if you can come from a "family of gangsters then business people don't really measure up". Looking back on Cane's "power jobs", Goddard stated: "I don’t think Cane has the book learning skills side of it, but I think he has the life lessons side of it, based on who he is and where he has come from. The way he does business with people, he kind of understands who they are as people."

=== Backstory and maternity ===
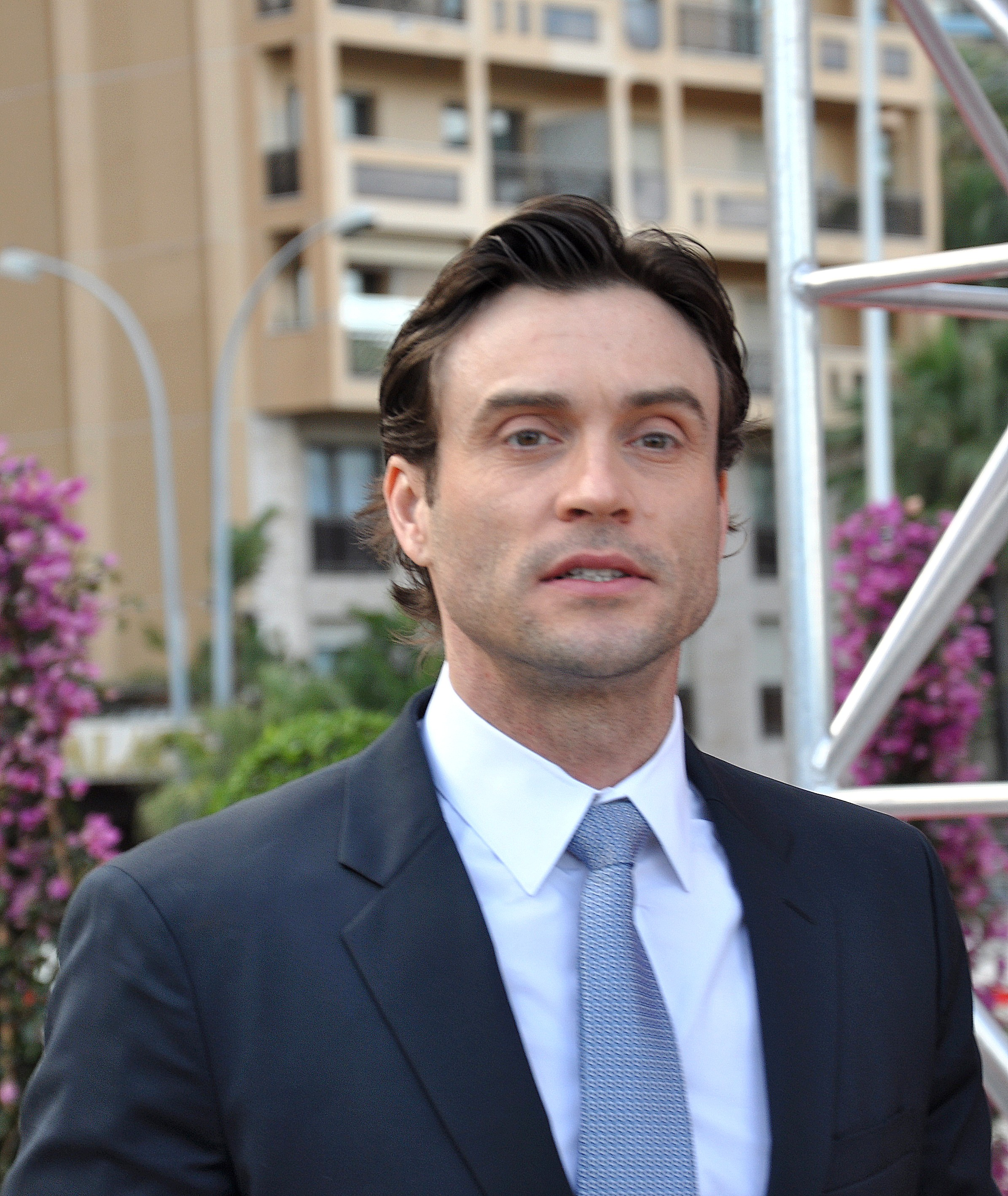
Daniel Goddard stated that he welcomed the revelation that Jill Abbott (Jess Walton) was Cane's mother as it "added more color to his portrayal", and enjoyed the 2009 rewrite of the character's backstory.

William J. Bell had created the character of Phillip Chancellor III in 1976, and he remained a vital part of the soap opera's storylines until his death onscreen in 1989. In 2007, Latham rewrote Chancellor's birth by establishing that Katherine Chancellor (Jeanne Cooper), Jill's enemy and Phillip Chancellor II's wife, switched their child with another hours after his birth; the character was brought back to the series as an adult named Cane Ashby, an Australian looking for his birth mother. During that time, Goddard did not want to know the real motives of his character because he did not want that to influence his performance. After the revelation that Jill was Cane's mother, his views changed, saying he "now welcomed the information as it added more color to his portrayal". The initial lack of information made portraying Cane difficult since there was an amount of ambiguity over whether he was a good, bad, or mediocre character. The ambiguity deepened when Goddard read the script revealing that a DNA test performed for Jill and Cane came back negative. He stated that he had never asked Latham "what was going on" with the storyline, but told her that he could "play anything he needed to". A second DNA test later confirmed Cane as Jill's son. Goddard also said it was "too good to be true" for Cane to be Jill's son, adding that, "But, down the road you realize these people actually do care about you, that you can reciprocate that care. For Cane, he's had so much time without them it's pointless to have the time with them and not enjoying it." Though the maternity question was answered, more ambiguity about Cane's intentions appeared as the character received a phone call from his uncle Langley that hinted about Cane scheming against Jill and Katherine. The original intent of the call was to show that Cane wanted what was owed to him after being given away as an infant. The writers changed directions after the popularity of the character grew. Goddard said he felt the phone call was resolved within the story when Cane sent money to his uncle as part of taking care of him.

In 2008, the storyline about the call Cane received from Langley was readdressed, as re-written by Maria Arena Bell. In her revised version of the storyline, Langley is really Phillip Chancellor III, portrayed by Thom Bierdz. The series kept secrecy around the plot twist by sneaking Bierdz in to tape scenes and asked that he not tell anyone of his return. Goddard liked the plot twist because it added another dimension to Cane, saying that the change would "allow another metamorphosis to begin" and additional "development and evolution of Cane". He also said that Cane had always been a "three-dimensional character" and "a fourth dimension" would soon be seen because the viewers would finally find out where he came from and who he is. Bell later introduced Tristan Rogers as Colin Atkinson and Genie Francis as Genevieve Atkinson, who would portray Cane's biological parents. Goddard stated that Rogers being on the soap opera "created a father/son rapport" for the character, which he thought had "a lot of promise" and was a "wonderful dynamic".

=== Relationships ===
The character's first romance on the soap opera was with Amber Moore (Adrienne Frantz). She later tricked him into believing they were married, and they separated after the truth surfaced. After the relationship ended, the writers planned on pairing Cane with Phyllis Summers (Michelle Stafford), but the popularity of Phyllis' romance with Nicholas Newman (Joshua Morrow) halted the plans for the pairing. Cane was instead written into a romance with Lily Winters (Christel Khalil); Goddard described Lily as becoming Cane's "anti-Amber". He felt the character lost a "certain amount of edge" and a "certain amount of his dynamic" after being paired with Lily but said it was replaced with "a level of compassion, understanding, tolerance, romance and love", since that those characteristics were "all the things that daytime is really about at its core".

Goddard on why Cane's romance with Lily has garnered fan attention (2012)

It rings true in their hearts. Other couples on the show might have infidelities or say one thing and do another, but the fans understand that there's such a love between Cane and Lily that every time they face an obstacle, they want one to help the other through the obstacle. It goes back to the core of soap values, which is strong, romantic couples – beautiful ingénues who sweep up the hearts of strong leading men. It's about creating a place where you can say, "I believe in romance".

— Deanna Barnert, MSN Entertainment

Goddard compared the romance between Lily and Cane to Lady Chatterley's Lover since both characters grew and learned from the relationship. Cane developed an attraction to Heather Stevens (portrayed by Vail Bloom) while with Lily; Goddard noted it would "come down to what Cane needs" when choosing between the two women. The storylines written for the lovers included a controversy with the characters' age gap, a miscarriage, and a love rectangle with Chloe Mitchell (Elizabeth Hendrickson) and Billy Abbott (Billy Miller). Within the love rectangle story, Chloe tricks Cane into thinking they conceived a child together. To make the storyline work, the writers scripted Cane as less intelligent, a strategy they used previously during his storyline with Amber. To keep the character from looking bad, Goddard said he made acting choices to justify Cane's actions. Despite the lessening of the character's intelligence, Goddard said he liked the story because of the originality of the plot. Love triangles and questioned paternity happen regularly in soap operas, but he felt that former head writer Maria Arena Bell managed to make those conventions fresh and new. Khalil stated that she "loved" the storyline, also saying she loved the actors involved in it. Khalil said she thought it "was a possibility" for Lily and Cane to have a happy ending, and that Lily "can see the hope, and they can adapt and love each other in a more mature and honest way". Cane married Lily in 2009, and the following year, Global BC called Lily the love of Cane's life. In 2011, Lily divorced Cane after he continued to lie to her about his faked death. However, she eventually discovered Cane was trying to protect her, and they were remarried. Goddard commented that their relationship "had come full circle" and "was being done well". Of Cane and Lily's second wedding, Goddard stated that Cane and Lily have "certainly had a lot of ups and downs", but he thought through all of that their fans "stayed true and they have expressed their desire for what they want to see". Goddard also thought their wedding of "this caliber" would make their fans "very, very happy and that is what this is about".

=== 2011 departure ===
Goddard was fired from the soap opera in 2011, and Cane was shot to death onscreen on the episode dated February 2. There were rumors that Maria Arena Bell, Latham's successor, killed the character because he was created by Latham, but this was denied. Soap Opera Weekly reported another rumor regarding the firing, saying tension between the actor and his co-stars resulted in Goddard's exit. Cane's onscreen death caused a "massive outcry" from viewers, and fans campaigned for the actor's return by sending emails and making phone calls to CBS and Sony Pictures Television. As part of the campaign, a group of viewers paid for an airplane to fly over CBS Studios with the message: "Y&R Fans Want Daniel Goddard As Cane Ashby". The plane flew over the building for about an hour. Regarding the campaign, Goddard stated: "When they started their campaign to bring Cane back, I wrote on my Facebook page that I never expected this. I have the greatest fans. There are no ifs, ands or buts about it. One of my fans coined Goddard's Family of Fans and that's what it is, GFF." In another interview, he stated he was "humbled" by viewer efforts to have him remain as the character. The actor was then rehired, revealing within the storyline that Cane's death had been faked and his twin brother, Caleb, was the one who died. Goddard had stated that he was very impressed with the soap opera's ability to keep Cane's faked death a secret. For his death scene, Goddard said he did research on how the human body reacts muscularly, how much control the person has, and what their breathing is like. Goddard stated that he did not know which character he was portraying until a certain point through the storyline, and that he "had to play it ambiguously". He also commented that it was difficult as an actor as he did not want it to look like Cane was ever manipulating Lily, however, he said it thought it was a "great storyline the fans could get behind".

=== Aristotle Dumas (2025–present) ===
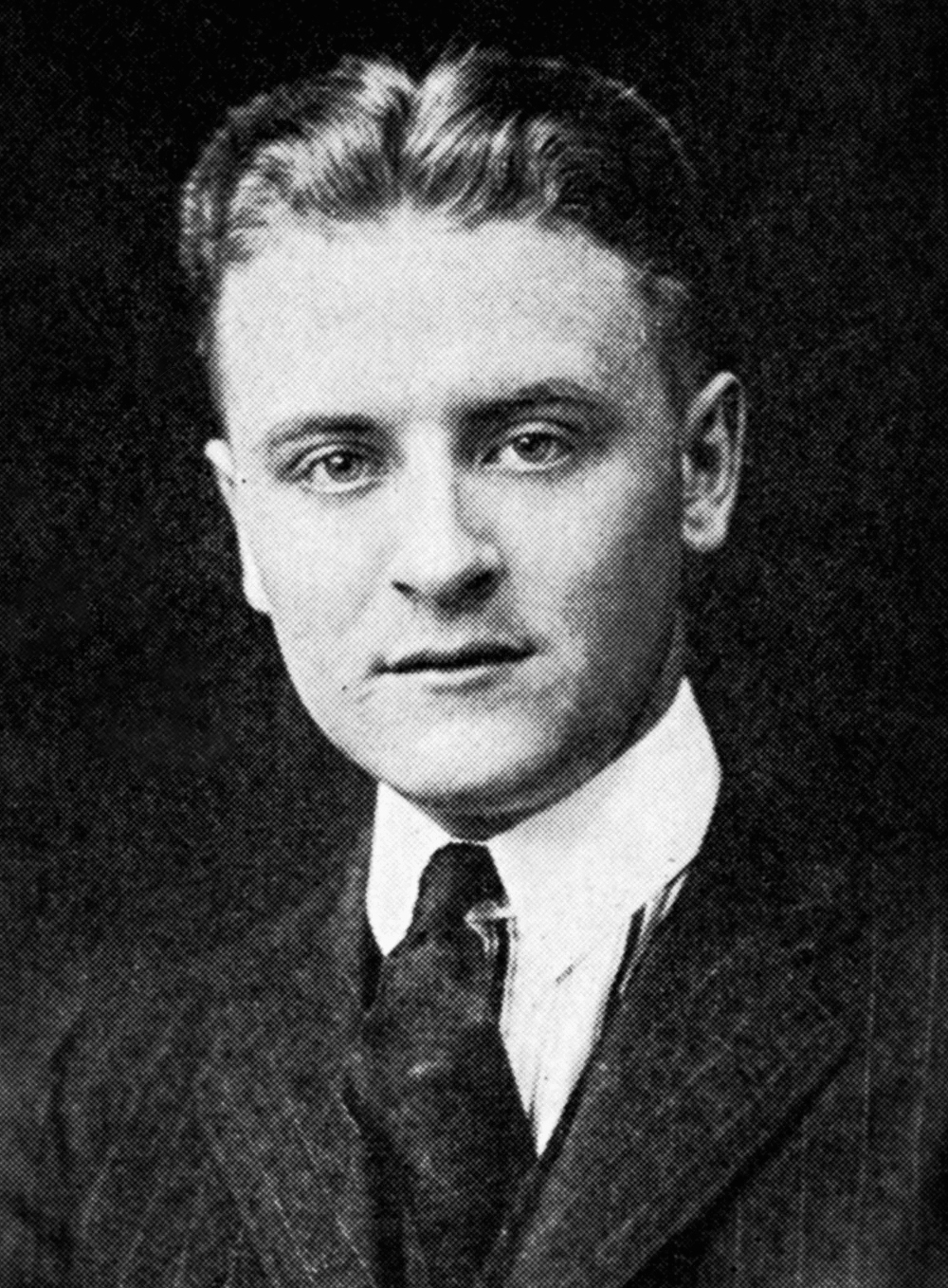
Cane's pseudonym of Aristotle Dumas is a comparison to Jay Gatsby in F. Scott Fitzgerald's (pictured) novel The Great Gatsby (1925).

In early 2025, Josh Griffith began to introduce the mysterious storyline of Aristotle Dumas, who is first mentioned when Victor Newman (Eric Braeden) investigates Damian Kane's (Jermaine Rivers) newfound fortune and discovers it was acquired from Aristotle; with this information, Victor tells Lily it is Aristotle who is interested in the Hamilton Winters Group. Confronted, Damian revealed he claimed to be the owner of the companies per the request of Aristotle, whom he only communicated with via email or text. Billy (Jason Thompson) begins interacting with Aristotle, who expresses his interest in Abbott Communications. That May, Amanda Sinclair (Mishael Morgan) returned to Genoa City, revealing she works for the mysterious Aristotle.

In June, Griffith previewed to Soaps.com that he had found "exactly the right person" to portray Aristotle, with the website noting it was "hard to imagine it being a coincidence that the character and Billy Flynn begin airing the same week". When Flynn's casting was announced as Aristotle, he compared himself in the role to that of "the person behind the Great Gatsby", recalling the character of Jay Gatsby from F. Scott Fitzgerald's 1925 novel, The Great Gatsby. This led soap media and fans to further suspect Aristotle Dumas as a pseudonym for Cane; Screen Rant cited the fan theory of Flynn's casting as changing "everything", while also stating his casting "only adds more speculation to who Aristotle really is". Following the June 20 reveal that Cane was Aristotle Dumas, Flynn spoke to TV Insider regarding his casting. He revealed the hardest part was "the idea that I'm playing Aristotle Dumas, this refined businessman who Cane created". He further explained his previous comparison to The Great Gatsby, stating: "Cane created Aristotle Dumas the way that James Gatz created Gatsby. Lily is Daisy. He created this world to prove to her that he’s good enough for her, and that is a beautiful story to me."

Flynn also revealed plans to rebrand the role, stating, "Cane is a fascinating character. Essentially, we're going to rebrand it a bit, so they [Cane and Lily] have a closer age range, and I don't have a sexy accent. I can't replicate it, so I'm going to do my thing. When people see this Cane and the relationship that I have as Cane with Lily, I think they'll be happy." Khalil echoed Flynn's statement, stating she believed Griffith had done a "good thing" in changing the character with Flynn's casting. She further explained it was "not going to be the same Cane. It's a completely different person, and I really hope that everybody gives Billy a chance and tries to look at the character through new eyes, because it is a new person, and honestly, it's a new character. He's nothing like Daniel Goddard, and that's kind of the point. The point was to make this character something completely different. And so hopefully people give it a chance and look at it like a new relationship rather than like an old one coming back."

Of his casting, Flynn referred to it as a "dream come true" and recalled, "I know all these actors, watching them and admiring them for years". Michael Fairman suggested the potential foreshadowed death of Rivers' Damian, predicting, "Is Y&R going White Lotus on us? Stay tuned." Khalil complimented Flynn's casting, stating, "I heard great things from some of the other cast members who had either worked with him or knew people that worked with him. He's such a great guy and great to work with."

== Storylines ==
In January 2007, Cane debuted as a bartender at "Indigo", Neil Winters' (Kristoff St. John) nightclub, remaining in the United States beyond the expiration of his visa, leaving him fearful of being deported. Thereafter, he became involved with Amber Moore (Adrienne Frantz), who first used him to make Adrian Korbel (Eyal Podell) jealous and later found out Cane was looking for his birth mother. He had been adopted by a woman named Violet Montgomery and raised by her brother, Langley Ashby, after her death in Canberra, Australia. Amber was trying to find Phillip Chancellor III, Jill Abbott's (Jess Walton) lost son, who was really switched at birth with another child by Katherine Chancellor (Jeanne Cooper). Amber realized that Cane might be Jill's son and decided to marry him; they went to Las Vegas, became intoxicated and Amber tricked Cane into thinking they were married. Amber's suspicions of Cane being Jill's son were proven true, and Cane shared a reunion with Jill, as well as prevented his deportation. Cane and Amber then moved into the Chancellor Estate and he began working for Katherine's company. Cane then found their marriage certificate and noticed that his signature was unrecognizable, leading to his discovery that the marriage was invalid. Cane then rejected a devastated Amber. Cane shared a kiss with Lily Winters (Christel Khalil) in September 2007, sparking an attraction to Heather Stevens (Vail Bloom). Cane and Heather decided to be friends and Cane pursued Lily romantically, despite initial hesitations due to their age difference. Lily then became pregnant with Cane's child but soon miscarries. They later move into a house together, and Cane proposes in August 2008; she accepts. Cane then passed out intoxicated in Chloe Mitchell's (Elizabeth Hendrickson) car, Chloe takes advantage of Cane and tricks him into believing they slept together. Chloe was pregnant prior to her scheme but Cane was not excluded as a possible father. Lily moved out of their house upon this discovery and convinced Cane to marry Chloe for the sake of the child, however, Chloe's real identity was Kate Valentine, daughter of Esther Valentine (Kate Linder). Cane had the marriage annulled but still decided to stay with Chloe. Billy Abbott (Billy Miller) then discovered he was the father of Chloe's child, but decided to let Cane raise it. Billy and Lily then began an affair despite Cane still being in love with Lily and Chloe with Billy. Cane later discovers that the child, Delia, was not his and was convinced by Lily not to fight for custody but instead resume their relationship; they were later married.

After the wedding, Cane recalled a phone call he had with his "Uncle Langley" regarding their con with Jill and Katherine. Afterward, Langley was revealed to be the long deceased Phillip Chancellor III in June 2009; Cane was in fact not Jill's son but someone hired by Phillip. Lily and Cane separated upon this revelation, but soon reunited upon her diagnosis with ovarian cancer. Her uterus was taken out during surgery, but the doctors were able to harvest two of her eggs; they decided to start a family with Mackenzie Browning (Clementine Ford) acting as their surrogate mother. Browning became pregnant with twins. Afterward, an immigration officer arrested Cane and planned to deport him, as he was not truly Phillip. Since he was present for the birth of his children, Charlie and Mattie in June 2010 and helped Lily overcome cancer he was not deported. Cane was then blackmailed by the crime family he turned to in Australia, and embezzled money from Tucker McCall's (Stephen Nichols) company with the help of Sofia Dupre (Julia Pace Mitchell). Cane's biological father, Colin Atkinson (Tristan Rogers), then came to Genoa City in December 2010 to help Blake Joseph blackmail Cane. Colin then became engaged to Jill much to Cane's dismay. Cane then tried to stop their wedding but was shot in the chest by Blake on the church steps; he died afterward, leaving Lily devastated. Lily then began believing she was receiving afterlife messages from Cane and sought professional help. After seeing Cane several times, Lily realized he wasn't a figment of her imagination; it was then revealed in May 2011 that the man shot at the church wasn't Cane, but his identical twin brother, Caleb, who was scheming with Colin to kidnap Charlie and Mattie. However, Cane continued to act as Caleb to stop the plot with Colin and later his mother, Genevieve (Genie Francis). When Lily found out about the entire conspiracy, she refused to forgive Cane and divorced him. After Colin tried to kidnap her children, Lily began to forgive Cane and let him protect her. When Cane threatened to return to Australia, Lily let him back into her life. Later, they reunited when she realized the cause of all the secrets: to take down Colin. Cane proposed to her again and they married in Provence, France in February 2012. Genevieve stays in town, and Cane constantly rejects her for everything she has done. Cane and Lily then go to work at Jabot Cosmetics, where Cane is interim CEO. Tyler Michaelson (Redaric Williams) becomes smitten with Lily and the two develop an attraction, making Cane jealous. Lily and Tyler share a kiss, but she turns him down and returns to Cane.

Cane then helps Katherine discover she has a brain tumor that needs to be removed. While she is on sick leave, she names Cane interim CEO of her company, Chancellor Industries. He later hires an assistant, Hilary Curtis (Mishael Morgan), whom Jill and then Lily become suspicious of. Meanwhile, an unknown blogger is targeting the Winters family online, with photos of Hilary kissing Cane as well as the two of them in a hotel room. After a private investigation, the Winters figure out Hilary is the blogger (as she blames Neil for her mother's death years prior) just as Hilary attempts to drug Cane. She is fired from Chancellor Industries and shunned by the family. Soon after, everyone gets word that Katherine has died from terminal cancer while on trip around the world. She leaves Cane as CEO, but leaves her percentage to Victor (Braeden). After recovering their marriage, Cane and Lily agree to become the new managers of the Genoa City Athletic Club after her brother Devon Hamilton (James) buys it. In 2015, Cane and Lily experience marital problems after Lily learns Cane knew about Devon and Hilary's affair. Cane takes a job at Fenmore's and begins to grow close to his step-aunt, Lauren Fenmore (Tracey Bregman). The two eventually share a kiss which causes further problems within his marriage. Incorrectly thinking he and Lauren are having an affair, Lily lashes out by sleeping with Cane's friend and one-time business associate, Joe Clark (Scott Elrod). Cane dumps Lily after she confesses to the tryst. The two reconcile a few months later with Joe having become obsessed with Lily. He is subsequently framed by Joe as having involvement in Hilary's disappearance. Lily is unsure of what to believe causing Cane to be upset that she would question his innocence and the two separate, with Cane moving out of their home. Lily sleeps with Joe again before finding out the truth. Lily agrees to help Cane clear his name but he rejects her attempts to reconcile. The two eventually reconcile in early 2016. Jill purchases Brash & Sassy and appoints Cane co-CEO alongside Billy (Thompson) and Victoria Newman (Amelia Heinle).

In 2017, Jill sells Brash & Sassy to Victoria and Lily becomes their brand ambassador. Cane believes Victoria's romantic feelings for Billy make her bias, so Cane plots to have Billy fired. After Billy secures a lucrative deal for Brash &Sassy everyone travels to Los Angeles to film a national commercial. Cane pays a videographer to alter footage involving Billy. The footage airs during a live broadcast causing a PR nightmare. As a result, Lily's commercial is pulled and Brash & Sassy loses a substantial amount of money. Prior to this, while on a business trip to Tokyo, Cane gets drunk and has sex with a colleague, Juliet Helton (Laur Allen). Cane tries to keep the one-night-stand a secret but when Victoria fires Juliet for approving the footage, she files a sexual harassment lawsuit against the company naming Cane as her harasser. Cane at first denies anything sexual happened but when Juliet announces her pregnancy he finally admits to a tearful Lily that he had sex with Juliet. Victoria feels forced to settle the suit and fires Cane for costing her company a substantial amount of money. After a DNA test proves Cane is the father, he is thankful that Lily decides to stay in their marriage but the videographer comes back asking for more money. Cane, afraid of Lily learning he is responsible for her national commercial being pulled, uses the twin's private high school tuition money to pay him off. When Lily learns of this from Billy and Victoria, she kicks him out and he moves into the Chancellor Mansion. After months of unemployment Jill agrees to appoint him interim CEO of Chancellor Industries. He is devastated when Lily files for divorce but when Juliet dies during childbirth the divorce is postponed. Upon Lily's suggestion, Cane names his newborn son Sam, after his deceased younger sister Samantha.

In 2018, Cane pursues Lily to Paris, the two have a romantic reunion and they renew their vows on Valentine's Day. Lily is later sentenced to a year in prison for vehicular homicide and is sent to prison. Cane struggles with loneliness in her absence and kisses Victoria Newman twice. The second of which Billy Abbott interrupts and relays to Lily that Cane is cheating on her while she's in prison. She is upset but vows to "survive this by any means necessary." Lily subsequently cuts off communication with Cane and removes him from her visitors list. When Cane later receives divorce paper in the mail, he rips them up and vows to fight for his marriage. Cane pleads with Lily to work on their marriage but Lily sticks to her decision. Neil unexpectedly passes away on the day of Lily's release in April 2019 and Lily leaves Genoa City after her father's funeral. Cane is devastated at the loss of his marriage and after weeks of hoping Lily will return to him, he finally signs the divorce papers. During this time Cane develops a friendship with Traci Abbott (Beth Maitland) who supports him as tries to figure out his future without Lily. Traci develops a crush on Cane, which Cane is initially unaware of but later reciprocates which leads to him kissing her but the two decide to remain good friends instead of exploring a romantic relationship. In the fall of 2019, will pages are discovered that names Cane as the heir to the bulk of Katherine Chancellor's fortune, as opposed to his former brother-in-law Devon. Wanting to honor his late grandmother's wishes, Devon signs over the 2.4 billion dollars he inherited to Cane. Afterward, it is discovered that the new will pages were a forgery by Colin and Colin implicates Cane as a co-conspirator in the scam. Colin confesses to taking the money out of Cane's account and escapes from police custody. Cane vows to track down Colin, clear his name and return the money to the rightful heir.

In 2025, a mysterious billionaire Aristotle Dumas begins to seek interest in several companies based on Genoa City—namely Hamilton Winters Group and Abbott Communications. His name strikes interest in several residents, including Victor (Braeden) and Jack Abbott (Peter Bergman). With the assistance of Amanda Sinclair (Morgan) and his assistant Carter (Vincent Stalba), Aristotle invites select guests to Nice, France, where he intends to lift his mysterious identity. With Amanda's assistance, Aristotle reveals himself as Cane to Lily, telling her things would be explained after he greets his other guests.

== Reception ==
Tommy Garrett on Cane's storylines (2009)

Goddard seems to be one of the most honest actors in his scenes. Weeks ago when his Cane married Lily, you could see the joy on the actor's face playing those scenes. This week you could not only see but feel Cane's despair as he realized by the real Phillip Chancellor, III coming back to Genoa City, he would be the one losing. Cane lost his wife, his mother and grandmother in one big scene. This is a storyline that Maria Bell brilliantly brought to fruition in almost secrecy and with aplomb.

— Garrett, Canyon News

Cane's debut in 2007 received a mixed response. Soap Opera Digest praised the storyline as "a riveting tale". Nelson Branco of TV Guide Canada found the story unrealistic, but praised the addition of Goddard and Cane to the series, saying: "A few eyebrows were raised when The Young and the Restless decided to rewrite history by bringing in Daniel Goddard to play Jill's 'real' son, Phillip Chancellor. But as romantic rogue Cane Ashby, the talented newcomer seduced us into suspending our disbelief — for now!" Soon after the character's introduction, Cane and Goddard became popular among viewers and gained praise from critics. BuddyTV described Goddard as "spicing up The Young and the Restless" as Cane with "his character's storylines surrounding his true identity and his whirlwind relationship with Amber". Cane's romance with Lily later gained "a very vocal, and loyal fan base".

Janet Di Lauro of Soap Opera Weekly commended Maria Arena Bell's change to Cane's backstory, saying: "This story also breathes new life into Cane, who was becoming increasingly dull as a whitewashed, pompous do-gooder. Suddenly, he has his edge back." Soap Opera Digest gave the storyline a thumbs up and a thumbs down because, though it was an exciting twist, it happened too closely to the other Chancellor family rewrite undoing the mother and daughter relationship between Jill and Katherine. The magazine later named the storyline the "Most Preposterous Plot Twist" of 2009 because the rewrite "was way out of sync with Y&R's usual authentic approach to storytelling". In 2011, Tommy Garrett of Canyon News said that Goddard is "forever second guessing his character when asked about Cane by the media", also stating that, "To keep an edgy Cane, never to make him boring and lifeless. That's why Cane is forever keeping secrets from his wife Lily and step mom Jill." Garrett added that he was "interested to see what Maria Bell's plan is" to keep the character edgy, and that Goddard's performance is "always dependable, on fire and exciting". In 2013, another writer from Canyon News, LaDale Anderson, commented that it was difficult for Lily to resist attraction to Tyler Michaelson (Redaric Williams), saying that "trouble in paradise is brewing".

What's on TV's Terrell Smith compared the Flynn's potential casting as Cane to that of Rory Gibson assuming the role of Michael Corinthos on General Hospital, suggesting he wouldn't "rule out the possibility that a new actor can add some excitement to a veteran character." In response to the story involving Flynn's casting, Soap Opera Digest columnist Carolyn Hinsey wrote that "the story focused solely on the recast Cane holding Genoa City's A-listers hostage. Bringing Cane back to Genoa City, where he's on equal footing with Victor, Jack, and even Billy, is much more interesting because the action is balanced."
