= Genevieve Atkinson =

Fictional character from the American CBS soap opera The Young and the Restless

- The Young and the Restless character
- Portrayed by: Genie Francis
- Duration: 2011–2012
- First appearance: May 27, 2011
- Last appearance: November 2, 2012
- Created by: Maria Arena Bell, Hogan Sheffer and Scott Hamner
- Introduced by: Maria Arena Bell
In-universe information
- Other names: Jenny
- Occupation: Businesswoman
- Husband: Colin Atkinson (Backstory)
- Sons: Cane Ashby; Caleb Atkinson
- Daughters: Samantha Atkinson
- Grandsons: Charlie Ashby; Sam Ashby
- Granddaughters: Matilda Ashby

Genevieve Atkinson is a fictional character from the American CBS soap opera The Young and the Restless. Created by former head writer Maria Arena Bell as the mother of Cane Ashby (Daniel Goddard), the role was portrayed by Genie Francis, who is widely known for her three-decade long portrayal of Laura Spencer on the ABC soap opera General Hospital. Francis was excited to join The Young and the Restless, expressing disappointment in her former daytime role and saying that her fan base would "follow whatever she does." She made her first appearance during the episode airing on May 27, 2011.

Francis described Genevieve as harsh, saying her tragic past is the reason she acts this way. Her first storyline involved the revelation of her past with Colin Atkinson (Tristan Rogers), as she was intertwined with his life as a mob boss. The character would later develop a romance with Jack Abbott (Peter Bergman), which Francis hoped would give the audience "more insight into who this woman really is". Their relationship ends after Genevieve lied to Jack about a business deal she made. She also had a brief affair with Jack's business rival Victor Newman (Eric Braeden), which both their families criticized, and was revealed to have had a past with Tucker McCall (Stephen Nichols).

In September 2012, Francis was let go from the soap opera due to budgetary cuts. The actress stated she was disappointed to leave, but that executive producer Jill Farren Phelps was "very kind" in breaking the news to her. She made her last appearance on November 2, 2012. While the news of Francis' casting in the role was positively received, the actress received generally negative reviews for her portrayal, with Jamey Giddens of Zap2it calling it "embarrassingly-bad". Sara Bibel of Xfinity wrote that the character was not an "audience favorite", feeling that the written material was not on par with Francis' strengths as an actress. Despite negative feedback, Francis received a Daytime Emmy Award nomination for her portrayal in 2012.

== Casting ==
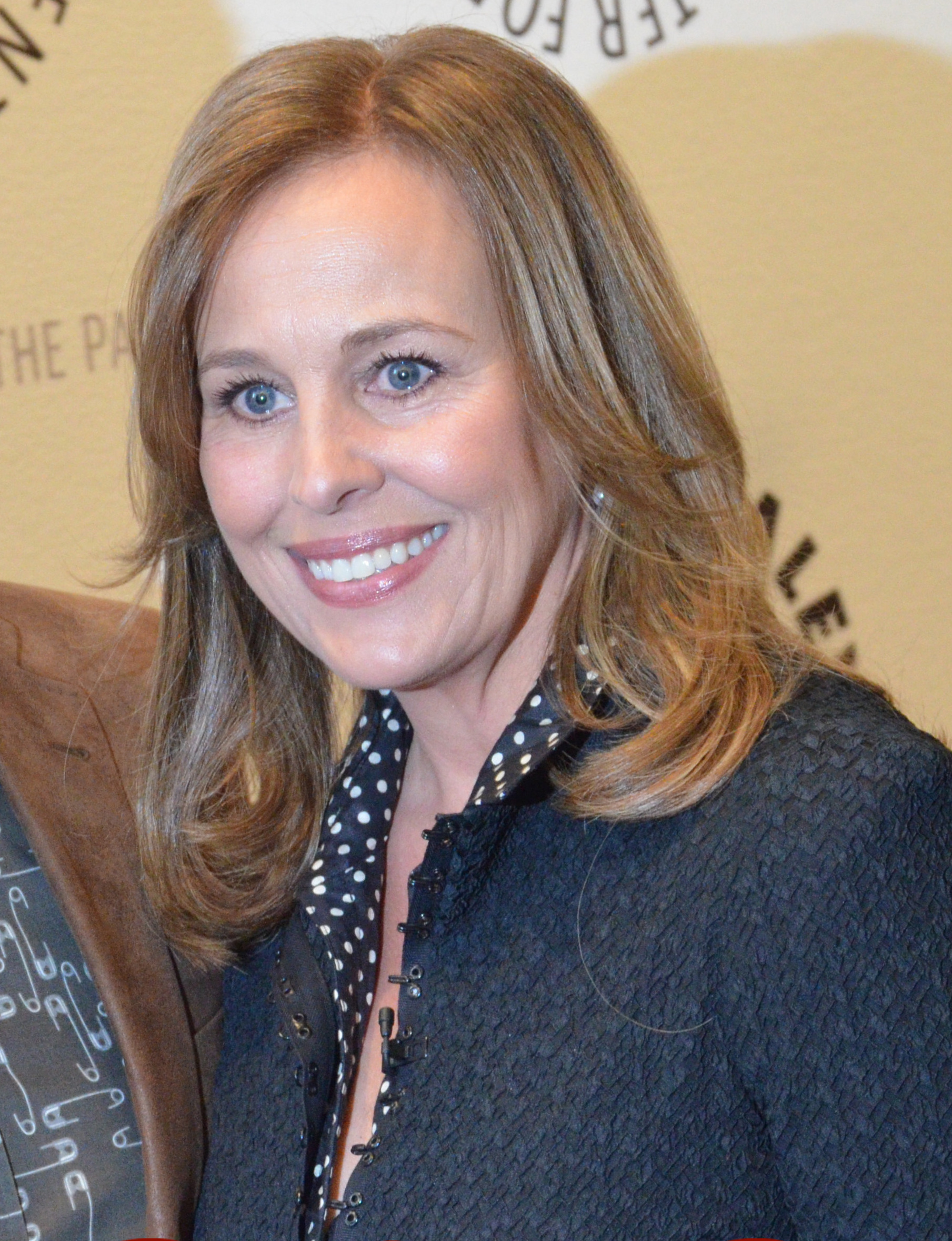
Genie Francis expressed disappointment in her former daytime role on General Hospital and stated that her "fan base will follow" whatever she does.

In February 2011, Francis, a soap opera "legend", reunited with her former onscreen husband, Anthony Geary, during the "Soap Opera Spectacular" episode of The Oprah Winfrey Show. Both Francis and Geary were part of the supercouple pairing of Luke and Laura on the ABC Daytime soap opera General Hospital. When questioned by show host Oprah Winfrey if Francis would ever reprise the role of Laura Spencer, she revealed: "I would like her to be funny and have a little bit of an agenda that might look a little bit vengeful, but it really isn’t. I think she’d have a plan. If there is a way to go forward with Laura and make her into what I'd like her to be now, then perhaps I would do it. There is nothing in me that is willing to play a victim anymore. I’m sort of done with the wounded dove in my life."

A month later in March 2011, it was announced that Francis had landed the newly created role of the mother of Daniel Goddard's character, Cane Ashby, on The Young and the Restless. The casting would reunite her with several of her former General Hospital alumni, including Tristan Rogers, Stephen Nichols, Judith Chapman and Kin Shriner. In a statement on how she received the newly created role, Francis revealed that Maria Arena Bell, the series' executive producer and head writer, called her (having seen her appearance on The Oprah Winfrey Show) and offered her a role personally, to which Francis accepted.

Francis also expressed her disappointment in her former daytime role on General Hospital. She said that she has found that her "fan base will follow" her whatever she does. She explained that, "My job is not to disappoint [My fans], not to cheat them. And I feel like the last little appearance on GH cheated them. I welcome the opportunity to do something new to continue to entertain my audience. What I loved about Laura—and what people loved about Laura—is that she is a terrific memory, but it’s just not there anymore." Soap Opera Digest later confirmed the character's name to be Genevieve Atkinson. Co-head writer of The Young and the Restless, Scott Hamner, stated that the role was going to be a "very, very different character than we've seen Genie Francis portray". Bell opened up about hiring Francis, revealing: "Genie is amazing and a real pro. I put pen and paper and she ran with it. She is really a brave, courageous actress" and added that "It really has been fantastic to watch, and I think she is terrific."

Prior to her onscreen debut, Francis appeared on the CBS talk show The Talk and stated that she "would not have this job without Oprah Winfrey", saying: "I must thank Oprah Winfrey here and now. I would not have this job without her. She made my dream come true as well." In August 2011, Francis began experiencing lack of screen-time, leading viewers to speculate she had been let go from the soap opera and possibly returning to her General Hospital role. However, a spokesperson for The Young and the Restless confirmed that Francis was simply taking a brief hiatus to film a sequel to her Hallmark Channel film The Note.

== Development ==
=== Characterization ===
"I will tell you it made me feel immediately lighter in my person. I just felt like I don’t have to wring my hands and cry all the time, and worry and focus on the pain, you know. Now the focus of this new character was: how do I entertain myself, even if it’s at your expense? It’s kind of like the character in House. I just say what I want to say because it tickles me. That was a fun-freeing part of the character to play and I enjoyed it."

— Francis, on how it felt from portraying Laura Spencer to Genevieve Atkinson (2011)

Francis characterized Genevieve as "harsh", attesting this quality to her past tragedy. In an interview with AOL, Francis said that, "Although tragic things have happened to her, she is not tragic." Michael Fairman of On-Air On-Soaps described Genevieve as an "eerie bitch". Jamey Giddens of Zap2it described her as "kooky" and "The Pervy-Odd Mob Mama". The soap opera's official website describes her relationship with Colin Atkinson (Tristan Rogers) as "twisted" and "confusing". Genevieve was considerably "darker" than the role of Laura Spencer on General Hospital, which Francis loved. She said, "It's so freeing to let your dark side shine for a minute and when you do a scene when you've been really evil, when the scene ends, you laugh. It's just fun."

Despite her history with Colin, the character happily pursued a romantic relationship with Jack Abbott (Peter Bergman). Speaking about the relationship, Francis stated: "I would like to continue to work with him because he is just so good, and Peter is so nice. I did do a couple scenes with him that I was really proud of, and they were right before the two of them make love for the first time. There were two scenes where Genevieve bares her soul to him. And through that, the audience hopefully got more insight into who this woman really is."

Genevieve ultimately damaged and destroyed her relationship with Jack after purchasing "Beauty of Nature" using her holding company, ForgetMeNot. Jack was previously working to take over this company, and broke up their engagement, suing her for fraud. Genevieve later told Jack that she will give him Beauty of Nature if he would give their relationship another try, but this did not work out. Genevieve has also had a rivalry with Jill Abbott (Jess Walton); as Jill previously believed she was Cane's mother.

=== Departure ===
In September 2012, following the hiring of former General Hospital executive producer Jill Farren Phelps onto the series, Francis was let go from the soap opera due to budgetary cuts from Sony Pictures Television and CBS. Phelps had previously stated that there would be cast changes to the series due to monetary reasons. When asked specifically about reports indicating Francis' dismissal, she said: "Genie and I had a wonderful talk when I came to Y&R and I think we're really quite fond of each other. She's a magnificent actress." Despite confirmations that the actress' dismissal was due to budgetary reasons, Jillian Bowe of Zap2it reported a rumor that "the veteran's tenure on the show wasn't well-received by the brass at CBS and Sony". Sara Bibel of Xfinity reported another rumor about her dismissal, saying it was "no secret" that Francis and Phelps "did not get along" while both worked on General Hospital, and that "few are surprised that the two were not eager to work together again".

After news broke of Francis' exit, several sources, including Entertainment Weekly, TVLine and TVSource, speculated that Francis would be returning to her General Hospital role. Francis made her final appearance on November 2, 2012. When asked how she heard she was let go from The Young and the Restless from Phelps, Francis said that she had no hard feelings, stating that she observed Phelps to be "mortified". She explained: "There are no bad feelings. Look, she's a very accomplished, powerful producer and she couldn’t get there by being petty and bitchy. Her back is to the wall. She had to cut people out because she had to balance her budget." In January 2013, Francis returned to the role of Laura Spencer on General Hospital.

== Storylines ==
In May 2011, Genevieve arrives in Genoa City with her presumed dead son, Cane Ashby (Daniel Goddard), who is posing as his actually dead twin brother, Caleb. Genevieve and her son are working against Colin Atkinson (Tristan Rogers), her husband and Cane's father, who she believes murdered her daughter by Colin, Samantha. Genevieve later lures Colin to her home where she set up a shrine for Samantha and tries to push him off a balcony because he was abducting their grandchildren, Charlie and Mattie Ashby. Colin is saved from his fall by his wife, Jill Abbott Fenmore (Jess Walton), and at the hospital it is revealed that Colin and Genevieve are still legally married, invalidating his marriage to Jill. Genevieve attempts to bond with Charlie and Mattie, however, Cane's wife Lily Winters (Christel Khalil) is against that as she believes her mother-in-law is dangerous. Colin is put in prison, and his marriage to Genevieve legally ends thereafter. Genevieve then starts flirting with Jack Abbott (Peter Bergman), leading to a relationship, and Jack also hires her at Jabot Cosmetics. Later, Colin locks Genevieve in the wine cellar at her home, planning an explosion that would kill her and Gloria Bardwell (Judith Chapman). The explosion goes awry when Lily and Genevieve’s unseen housekeeper, Myrna Murdock, ends up as the explosion’s victim. Colin is arrested and deported back to Australia. Myrna is revealed to be Patty Williams (Stacy Haiduk), Jack's ex-wife who is still obsessed with him. She (Myrna/Patty) claims she is shy following the explosion and refuses to show her face in public. Soon after, Jack proposes to Genevieve and she accepts, enraging Patty.

When Adam Newman (Michael Muhney) sells cosmetics line Beauty of Nature off to the highest bidder, Jack was planning on becoming the highest bidder and winning the line, however, Genevieve's bid, made through her holding company FMN, is the highest and she becomes the owner of Beauty of Nature. Jack becomes suspicious of her money source when he finds a bank statement of hers. Cane remembers that FMN stands for "Forget Me Not", the words engraved on the urn holding Samantha's ashes. Genevieve later realizes she cannot marry Jack as she was disloyal to him; she writes him a Dear John letter and plans to leave town, however, Patty steals Genevieve's wedding dress and walks down the aisle in her place with her face covered. When Jack uncovers her, an enraged Patty shoots Jack in the stomach. At the hospital, it is revealed that FMN is Genevieve's holding company, and Jack and his family reject her due to her betrayal. She finds solace in Victor Newman (Eric Braeden). Genevieve later agrees to sell Beauty of Nature to Jack if he gives their relationship another try. They agree to get married in Las Vegas, but Genevieve overhears Jack telling Nikki Newman (Melody Thomas Scott) that he doesn't love her and he is just marrying her to get back ownership of Beauty of Nature. A heartbroken Genevieve leaves Jack before the wedding, ends up having sex with Victor and sells the cosmetics line back to him. The SEC later begins investigating Genevieve and where she got the funds to buy Beauty of Nature, and they later cut off all her assets, including her home. She then discovers that she is being stolen from, and asks expert hacker Kevin Fisher (Greg Rikaart) to help her determine the culprit. Her stolen money is later found on Cane’s doorstep and her room at the local athletic club is trashed, leading to suspicion that Samantha is alive and doing all of these actions.

Tucker McCall (Stephen Nichols) is later seen with a photograph of Genevieve as a teenager, revealing that the two dated before she ran off to Australia with Colin. When Victor goes missing, Tucker enlists Genevieve’s help and promises to reward her if she does. Genevieve finds Victor in Los Angeles suffering from amnesia. Victor believes his name is "Christian." Genevieve poses as a barmaid, calling herself Jenny, so she can watch Victor. After Victor regains his memory, Genevieve helps him get home to Genoa City. After their return, Genevieve is shunned by the town for keeping Victor away. Afterward, someone began impersonating Samantha, and when Cane found the woman, she insisted that Genevieve put her up to this. Genevieve denied any involvement but was convinced Colin was behind the plot. When the woman's hotel room was found trashed with blood on the floor, Ronan Malloy (Jeff Branson) considered Genevieve a suspect. Fearing conviction for something she didn't do, she was able to get Tucker's help to disappear; they shared a heartfelt goodbye before she left town.

== Reception ==
Francis received generally negative reviews for her portrayal. Jamey Giddens of Zap2it wrote of the decision to sign Francis onto the series: "Maria Arena Bell just made Brian Frons kick a puppy in the face." After her debut, he called Francis' portrayal of Genevieve "embarrassingly-bad", stating: "I'm sure I will catch hell for going here about a daytime treasure, but Francis' portrayal of Cane and Caleb's (Daniel Goddard) unhinged mother has been cartoonish and abysmal from her first air show. I don't know if Francis is painfully attempting to channel the late Elizabeth Taylor’s fun, campy turn as Luke and Laura's arch nemesis Helena Cassadine on General Hospital 30 years ago, or going for Evil-Lyn from the old He-Man and the Masters of the Universe cartoon, but she's missing the mark either way." He also wrote that as much as he would "love to solely blame this performance on the writing—because let’s face it, the story is dreadful—Francis is the one making the choices to jerk, gasp and wince as Genevieve registers each and every emotion or painful memory. This is not the Genie Francis we know and love." Adam Hughes of Yahoo! wrote of viewers' reactions to Francis' debut and her portrayal, stating: "Since Francis arrived on the scene this spring, fan reaction to her revised on-screen attitude has been a mixed bag, but she continues to draw a ton of interest to her new CBS television digs. Former General Hospital followers may find her more biting character hard to swallow, and longtime fans of The Young and The Restless have watched her push aside some of their favorites, but Francis has undoubtedly shaken up the local landscape. Buzz is half the game when comes to keeping soap opera fans interested, and Francis has certainly delivered that."

Upon the news of Francis' casting, Sara Bibel of Xfinity wrote that the soap opera had "finally mastered the art of stunt casting". She also stated that seeing Francis paired with Tristan Rogers "will be delicious", and that she thought "we can all agree this is a far more exciting addition to the show than Eric Roberts or Sean Young". She gave "kudos" to the soap opera for creating "what is sure to be must-see daytime TV". When news broke of Francis' dismissal, Bibel wrote: "Francis's character, Genevieve, was, to put it mildly, not an audience favorite. She started out as a dark psychopath hellbent on revenge then, when that persona made the character less than viable over the longterm, morphed overnight into an aspiring business woman. Neither incarnation played to Francis’s strengths as an actress." Omar White-Nobles of TVSource wrote: "Genevieve was determined to bring down her crime lord husband Colin (Tristan Rogers) and attempt to reconcile with her son. Unfortunately for Francis, playing a vengeful ice queen turned shrewd businesswoman didn’t work for the audience. Subsequent attempts to soften the character failed as well, leaving aborted pairings with Jack Abbott (Peter Bergman) and Victor Newman (Eric Braeden)."

In 2012, Francis received a nomination for Outstanding Supporting Actress in a Drama Series at the 39th Daytime Emmy Awards for her portrayal of Genevieve. On her nomination, Francis felt that she had "tremendous good fortune" and was extremely thrilled to be a part of the show. She said: "I've only been with this show for a year, so I'm thrilled that we managed to put together some nice work that people are enjoying." However, she lost her bid for the award to former General Hospital co-star Nancy Lee Grahn for her portrayal of Alexis Davis.
