= List of The Young and the Restless characters introduced in 2010 =

The Young and the Restless is an American television soap opera. It was first broadcast on March 26, 1973, and airs on CBS. The following is a list of characters that first appeared in 2010, by order of appearance. All characters were introduced to the series by its head writer that year, Maria Arena Bell. Doppelgänger Sarah Smythe first appeared in April. June saw the arrival of Meggie McClaine, Spencer Walsh and twin characters, Charles and Matilda Ashby, born on-screen. Vance Abrams and Sofia Dupre debuted in July, followed by Blake Joseph's stint beginning in October. Colin Atkinson made his debut in December.

== Sarah Smythe ==
Sarah Smythe
- The Young and the Restless character
- Portrayed by: Tracey E. Bregman
- First appearance: April 9, 2010
- Last appearance: June 4, 2010
- Created by: Maria Arena Bell, Hogan Sheffer and Scott Hamner
- Introduced by: Maria Arena Bell and Paul Rauch
In-universe information
- Other names: Lauren Fenmore Baldwin
- Mother: Molly Carter
- Sisters: Sheila Carter
- Nephews: Ryder Callahan; John Finnegan
- Nieces: Daisy Carter; Mary Carter Warwick; Diana Carter

Sarah Smythe first appeared on April 9, 2010, portrayed by Tracey E. Bregman, who also portrays Lauren Baldwin, of whom Sarah is a doppelgänger. Sarah is the sister of Sheila Carter, Lauren's longtime nemesis. The character's creation was first announced in early April 2010. In an interview with TV Guide Magazine actress Tracey E. Bregman stated "I think it’d be too easy to kill Lauren. Sarah really wants Lauren to suffer because Sarah has suffered so much. In Sarah’s mind, Sheila was murdered in cold blood by Lauren. Also, Sarah had to raise Sheila’s children because Sheila was always so obsessed with Lauren that she wasn’t around to raise her kids properly." Bregman also noted that Sarah was "setting up this revenge" and was as powerful as Sheila.

Sarah mysteriously arrived in town with her niece, Daisy, and her nephew, Ryder, to torture Lauren Fenmore months before revealing her face, to avenge her sister's death. Daisy, Ryder and Sarah kidnap Lauren and locked her in a cage. When Sarah reveals herself to Lauren, she is revealed to have had plastic surgery to look exactly like Lauren, who thought Sarah was really Sheila. Sarah wanted revenge on Lauren for killing Sheila. Sarah plans to take over Lauren's life with her husband Michael Baldwin (Christian LeBlanc) and her young son Fenmore, but it wasn't so easy because Michael and Fenmore were suspicious. While Sarah was in Genoa City posing as Lauren, Michael sent her to therapist Dr. Emily Peterson (who was really Patty Williams). During their first session, Sarah saw right away that "Emily" was really Patty and became reacquainted with her by reminding her they previously met as they were friends in a South American plastic surgery office when Patty had cosmetic surgery to look like Emily. The two then conspired to help each other in continuing their deceitful impersonations of Emily and Lauren. When Ryder turned on Sarah and let Lauren free, Sarah chased Lauren into a house of mirrors and Sarah, who was about to shoot Phyllis Summers, is shot and killed by Lauren, leading Daisy and Ryder to escape and evade custody.

== Meggie McClaine ==
Meggie McClaine
- The Young and the Restless character
- Portrayed by: Sean Young
- Duration: 2010–11
- First appearance: June 8, 2010
- Last appearance: March 4, 2011
- Introduced by: Maria Arena Bell
In-universe information
- Occupation: Con artist Former assistant to Nikki Newman; Barmaid
- Husband: Francis Murphy (1986–87); Victor Newman (2010)

Meggie McClaine first appeared on June 8, 2010, portrayed by actress Sean Young. Her casting was announced by multiple sources in April 2010. On her casting and getting the role, Young said: "Getting the chance to work with my dear friend Eric Braeden, one of the true gentlemen in entertainment, was certainly a deciding factor for me as well as wanting to get back to work after taking a few years off to raise my kids." Young had previously worked with Braeden (Victor Newman) in a film The Man Who Came Back. When introduced, Meggie is described as "a feisty barmaid who is involved in a mystery with Victor Newman." Young also described her character as being "Spunky!". In the same interview, Young stated that her character was "Kindhearted" however the character proved ultimately opposite. In an interview with TV Guide Magazine, Young said "Meggie’s not very sophisticated. She wears an apron and a plaid shirt. She breaks up a bar brawl. She reminds me of Joan Blondell in that old TV series Here Come the Brides. I just sort of walk onto a set that way. “Sultry” was their description. [Laughs] I just call it me." Initially a guest role only appearing for a 5-episode stint, Young returned to The Young and the Restless in July 2010, and Entertainment Weekly reported that she would stay until August, however her storyline ended in October 2010. She returned in February 2011, with brief appearances until March 2011, with the character still being jailed at the time.

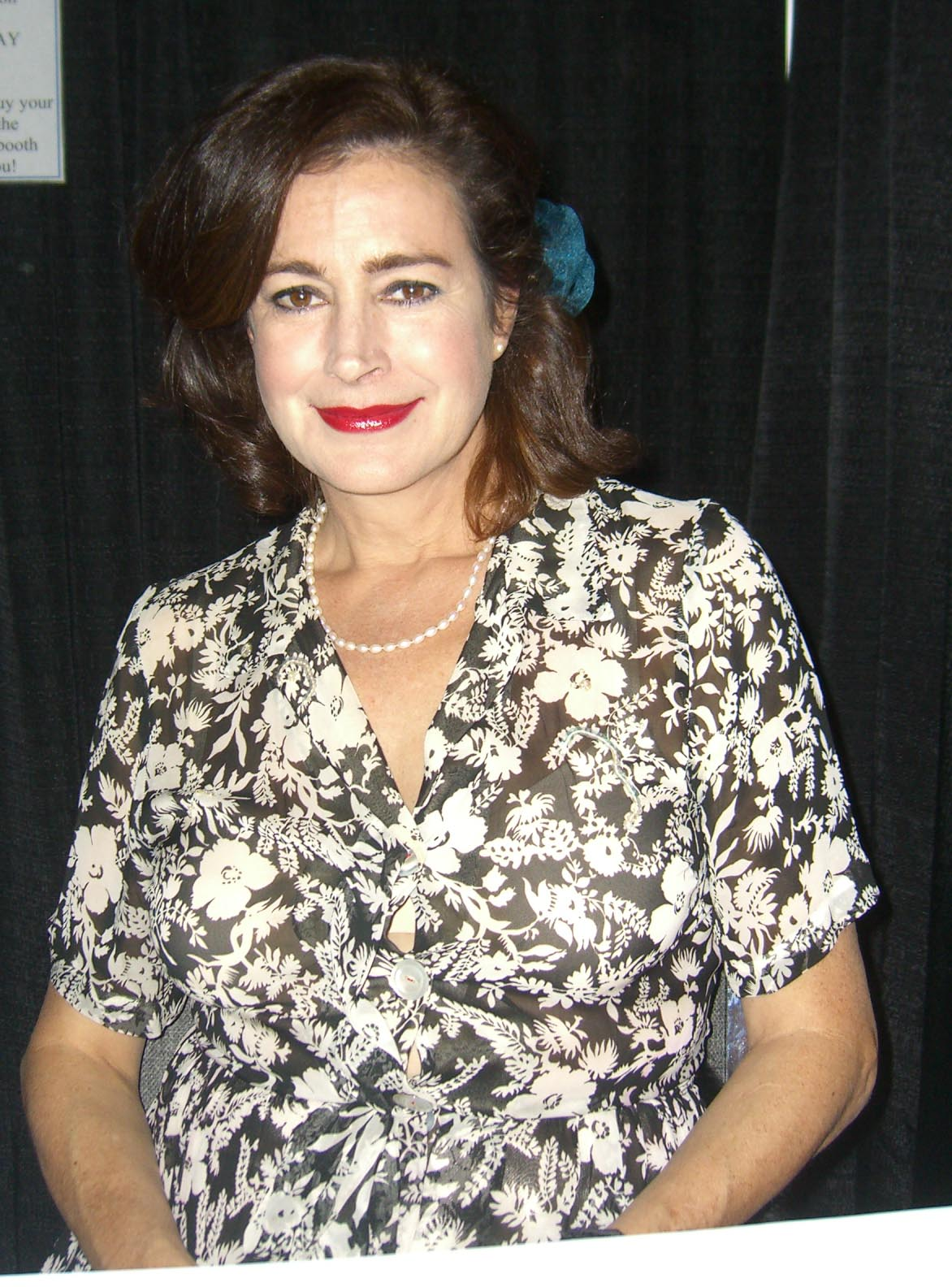
Sean Young (pictured) played the scheming con-artist, Meggie.

Meggie McClaine was a Canadian barmaid whom Victor Newman met while searching for his invidious son, Adam Newman, who faked his own death. Meggie helped Victor by handling a few customers at the bar that Victor needed information from. He promised Meggie that if she ever needed something that she could come to him as a repayment for her services to him. She tried to flirt with Victor, but he made it clear that he already had a special lady in his life, Nikki Newman, and he left Ottawa. Meggie picked up on Victor's offer only a few weeks later when she appeared on his doorstep and told him that she had to flee.

As a well-known business tycoon, Victor did a background check on Meggie, but he did not find anything that would lead him to believe that she was using him. Meggie began to work for Victor's fiancée, Nikki, as an assistant to her charity work, and she also became the right hand for planning the couple's wedding. When Meggie found out that Nikki was an alcoholic and has been sober for over a decade, she used this information to her advantage. She began to spike Nikki's drinks with vodka.

When Meggie got an assignment to bring a check from Victor to Katherine Chancellor, she met an old acquaintance in Katherine's husband, Patrick Murphy. Murphy planned to warn Nikki and Victor about her, but he suffered a heart attack in front of Meggie because she prevented him from taking his pills on time. Meggie watched with glee as Murphy gave into his heart attack. Murphy found himself in the hospital in recovery, not able to say anything about what happened to him. Meggie was revealed to be Murphy's ex-daughter-in-law, and she presumably killed Murphy's son. To continue her plan, Meggie found help in bartender, Deacon Sharpe, who was an alcoholic himself. He became Nikki's drinking buddy for a short while. With Victor and Nikki's wedding coming up, Meggie arranged for Nikki to be found drunk in Deacon's bed, and she was consequently shipped off to rehab.

Meggie used her time wisely in order to get closer to Victor so that she could become the next Mrs. Victor Newman. Like her previous husbands, Meggie most likely intended to kill Victor for his money after marrying him. Unfortunately, no one noticed how alarmed Murphy got whenever Meggie came near him, and no one noticed how dangerous she truly was. In November 2010, Meggie drugged Victor, and she finally tricked Victor into marrying her. When they arrived back at the Newman Ranch, Meggie gave Victor heart medication, trying to kill him. Victor woke up, demanding to know why she was rushing their relationship. Meggie was then exposed as a black widow, with Victor knowing about her devilish plan. With the arrival of Murphy and the police, Meggie was arrested for her crimes, just as Victor found out that Meggie was responsible for Nikki's relapse into alcoholism. Meggie currently resides in jail.

== Sofia Dupre ==
Sofia Dupre
- The Young and the Restless character
- Portrayed by: Julia Pace Mitchell
- Duration: 2010–12; 2019
- First appearance: July 20, 2010
- Last appearance: April 25, 2019
- Created by: Maria Arena Bell, Hogan Sheffer and Scott Hamner
- Introduced by: Maria Arena Bell and Paul Rauch (2010); Anthony Morina and Josh Griffith (2019)
In-universe information
- Other names: Sofia Winters
- Occupation: Chief Financial Officer at Tucker McCall Unlimited
- Father: Moses Dupre
- Husband: Malcolm Winters (2011); Neil Winters (2011–12)
- Sons: Moses Winters

Sofia Dupre first appeared on July 20, 2010, portrayed by actress Julia Pace Mitchell. Sofia was Mitchell's first major role. When the character arrived, she was described as "the feisty former right-hand woman to billionaire Tucker McCall and fiancée of Malcolm Winters. She is also introduced as a "Savvy business woman" and a generally "no-nonsense person" During an interview, Mitchell said she was a big fan of the show. Of her character, Mitchell that "she's actually been changing just in the seven months that she's been on the air. I hate to use the word "bossy," but I definitely think that she's bossy. She's a big boss." Mitchell said that Sofia runs things in her "relationship and in her business life". In September 2012, it was announced that Mitchell had been taken off her contract and bumped to a recurring status; however, she was not seen again after October 9, 2012. She returned in 2019.

Sofia arrives in Genoa City working on business for Tucker McCall. Sofia meets with Katherine Chancellor and Neil Winters in Tucker's place. The meeting leads to a confrontation between Sofia and Neil. Later, Sofia is revealed to be the fiancée of Neil's brother, Malcolm Winters. Neil is unhappy about this, which causes friction between him, Sofia, and Malcolm. Despite tensions there, Sofia has positive relations with the rest of the Winters family. She became aware of, and involved with, the problem Cane Ashby had been having with the men from Australia. While furious with him at first, she later decides to help him. Tucker finds out about her and Cane's cover up of some bad reports supposedly done by a new contractor named Blake that Cane claimed had a good reputation in business. In reality, Blake is one of the Australian men after Cane, and has been blackmailing him the whole time. This turns ugly and Tucker fires both Cane and Sofia. Malcolm is furious that Sofia did not tell him any of this, since Cane is married to his legal niece, and biological daughter, Lily. He breaks their engagement, within a few weeks of their scheduled Valentine's Day wedding. Shortly thereafter, Cane is murdered. The entire Barber/Winters family comes together to support Lily and her twin babies with Cane, Charlie and Matilda. Impressed with how Sofia has taken great pains to support Lily, and with Sofia estranged from Malcolm, Neil allows his deep-seated attraction to Sofia to surface. The two have sex, just before Malcolm decides to repair his fractured relationship with Sofia.

As Malcolm and Sofia repair their relationship, Neil seems worried over the relationship and confronts Sofia about it. She claims that she loves Malcolm and wants to be with him. Sofia and Malcolm married. During the honeymoon, Sofia learns that she is pregnant. While Malcolm is thrilled, Sofia wonders to herself if Neil is the baby's father. The baby – named Moses after her father, is born, and DNA testing reveals that Neil is the father. Malcolm leaves Genoa City and promptly divorces Sofia, who moves in with Neil when she and Moses are discharged from the hospital. A month later, Sofia and Neil agree to get married, for the baby's sake. However, Sofia struggles to connect with Neil and fears he doesn't truly love her, especially when he continuously flirts with Harmony Hamilton. When Neil and Harmony kiss, Neil admits to Sofia that he has feelings for her. Heartbroken, Sofia attempts to work on her marriage but nothing comes of it, and they announce they are divorcing. Afterward, Sofia tells Moses that they should start packing as nothing will be keeping them in Genoa City after the divorce. Sofia was offered a job in New York. After telling to Neil about the prospect of moving there with Moses, he warned her that she would not be taking Moses with her and threatened to file for sole custody.

== Charlie Ashby ==
Charlie Ashby
- The Young and the Restless character
- Portrayed by: Parker Rose Curry (2010–2012); Aidan Clark (2013–2016); Brandin Stennis (2016–2017); Noah Alexander Gerry (2017–2019)
- Duration: 2010–2019
- First appearance: June 25, 2010
- Last appearance: April 26, 2019
- Created by: Maria Arena Bell, Hogan Sheffer and Scott Hamner
- Introduced by: Maria Arena Bell and Paul Rauch (2010); Mal Young and Sally Sussman Morina (2017)
In-universe information
- Other names: Charles Ethan Ashby
- Occupation: Student
- Family: Winters
- Father: Cane Ashby
- Mother: Lily Winters
- Sisters: Mattie Ashby
- Half-brothers: Samuel Ashby
- Grandfathers: Malcolm Winters; Colin Atkinson; Neil Winters (legal)
- Grandmothers: Drucilla Winters; Genevieve Atkinson
- Uncles: Holden Novak; Nate Hastings (adoptive); Devon Hamilton (adoptive); Caleb Atkinson
- Aunts: Samantha Atkinson
- First cousins: Nate Hastings; Dominic Abbott Newman Winters Chancellor(adoptive)

Charlie Ashby is the son of Cane Ashby and Lily Winters. He was first portrayed as an infant by Parker Rose Curry, from 2010 to 2012, followed by Aidan Clark from 2013 to 2016, Brandin Stennis from 2016 to 2017 and Noah Alexander Gerry in 2017. Gerry was downgraded to recurring status in 2019.

He was born along with his twin sister, Matilda Ashby. Lily was diagnosed with ovarian cancer. Her uterus was taken out during a surgery to remove the cancer, but the doctor was able to harvest two of her eggs. Lily and Cane decided to start a family and pursued surrogacy options. Mackenzie Browning agreed to act as their surrogate and became pregnant. Mac went into labor at 28 weeks, and the twins were delivered. Mac then left Genoa City to be with JT Hellstrom, and Cane was thought to be killed, leaving Lily alone to raise the babies. Charlie and his sister, Mattie, were kidnapped by their grandfather, Colin Atkinson, in his attempt to take them back to Australia and mold them into model grandchildren that would be useful in his schemes in the mob. In a turn of events, Cane was found to be alive, while his twin brother, Caleb, was actually killed.

The twins almost died in an explosion as Cane fought off his father in order to save his children. After the twins were both in safe hands, Lily was shocked that her husband lied to her and vowed that she wouldn't let Cane be a part of their children's lives anymore. Lily later filed for divorce from Cane, who decided to move back to Australia because he had no reason to stay in Genoa City since Lily didn't love him anymore. While at the airport, Lily arrived with the twins, and the family reunited again in an embrace. Lily then allowed Cane to see the babies for supervised and scheduled visits, much to the dismay of Neil Winters and Daniel Romalotti. After Lily learned that Cane was keeping secrets from her because he was working with law enforcement to take down his father, Colin, she forgave him for being so standoffish, and the couple reunited with their children.

== Mattie Ashby ==
Mattie Ashby
- The Young and the Restless character
- Portrayed by: Jordan Lemnah (2010–2012); McKenna Roberts (2013–2017); Lexie Stevenson (2017–2019)
- Duration: 2010–2019
- First appearance: June 25, 2010
- Last appearance: April 26, 2019
- Created by: Maria Arena Bell, Hogan Sheffer and Scott Hamner
- Introduced by: Maria Arena Bell and Paul Rauch (2010); Mal Young and Sally Sussman Morina (2017)
In-universe information
- Other names: Matilda Colleen Ashby
- Occupation: Student
- Family: Winters
- Father: Cane Ashby
- Mother: Lily Winters
- Brothers: Charlie Ashby
- Half-brothers: Samuel Ashby
- Grandfathers: Malcolm Winters; Colin Atkinson; Neil Winters (legal)
- Grandmothers: Drucilla Winters; Genevieve Atkinson
- Uncles: Holden Novak; Nate Hastings (adoptive); Devon Hamilton (adoptive); Caleb Atkinson
- Aunts: Samantha Atkinson
- First cousins: Nate Hastings; Dominic Abbott Newman Winters Chancellor (adoptive)

Mattie Ashby, is the daughter of Cane Ashby and Lily Winters. Jordan Lemnah first portrayed the role as an infant, followed by McKenna Roberts, who took over in 2013 until 2017, then Lexi Stevenson in 2017. Stevenson was downgraded to recurring status in 2019.

She was born along with her twin brother, Charlie Ashby. Lily was diagnosed with ovarian cancer. Her uterus was taken out during a surgery to remove the cancer, but the doctor was able to harvest two of her eggs. Lily and Cane decided to start a family and pursued surrogacy options. Mackenzie Browning agreed to act as their surrogate and became pregnant. Mac went into labor at 28 weeks, and the twins were delivered. Mac then left Genoa City to be with J.T. Hellstrom, and Cane was thought to be killed, leaving Lily alone to raise the babies. Mattie and her brother, Charlie, were kidnapped by their grandfather, Colin Atkinson, in his attempt to take them back to Australia and mold them into model grandchildren that would be useful in his schemes in the mob. In a turn of events, Cane was found to be alive, while his twin brother, Caleb, was actually killed.

The twins almost died in an explosion as Cane fought off his father in order to save his children. After the twins were both in safe hands, Lily was shocked that her husband lied to her and vowed that she wouldn't let Cane be a part of their children's lives anymore. Lily later filed for divorce from Cane, who decided to move back to Australia because he had no reason to stay in Genoa City since Lily didn't love him anymore. While at the airport, Lily arrived with the twins, and the family reunited again in an embrace. Lily then allowed Cane to see the babies for supervised and scheduled visits, much to the dismay of Neil Winters and Daniel Romalotti. After Lily learned that Cane was keeping secrets from her because he was working with law enforcement to take down his father, Colin, she forgave him for being so standoffish, and the couple reunited with their children.

== Spencer Walsh ==
Spencer Walsh appeared from June 2010 to May 9, 2012, portrayed by Evan Parke. He is the former District Attorney in Genoa City. He had handled cases including Sharon Newman, Victor Newman and been involved in the Diane Jenkins Murder Case, which he had been involved with most recently. He has also handled legal issues with Chance Chancellor. In May 2012, it was revealed that Walsh had resigned from his post as District Attorney, with Michael Baldwin (Christian LeBlanc) taking over.

== Vance Abrams ==
Vance Abrams
- The Young and the Restless character
- Portrayed by: John Sloman (2010); Eric Roberts (2010–11)
- Duration: 2010–11
- First appearance: July 12, 2010
- Last appearance: April 11, 2011
- Introduced by: Maria Arena Bell
In-universe information
- Occupation: Attorney

Vance Abrams first appeared on July 12, 2010, played by John Sloman. Days later, the role was recast with Eric Roberts, brother of renowned actress Julia Roberts and father of teen star Emma Roberts. Roberts remained in the role from July 23, 2010, until April 11, 2011, and hasn't been seen since. Casting was announced on June 17, 2010, by TV Guide among other sources. Before appearing, his storyline was revealed to involve the scandalous and scheming Adam Wilson (Michael Muhney), who escaped from prison and then faked his own death –– and Vance would represent him in court. His character's appearance was initially to span just over August.

In 2010, Adam Newman and his new wife, Skye hired Vance due to charges (from his own family) that Adam was facing. Vance committed himself viciously to the case. Vance suggested that they expose Sharon Newman (Adam's true love at the time), however Adam refused to. Adam ended up winning in court. Since the Adam Newman case, Vance turned his attention to the young Abby Newman, who was being pressured by her uncle, Jack Abbott, to file a lawsuit against her father, Victor, for mishandling her trust fund. Vance offered his services to a reluctant Abby, but she ultimately agreed. Later on, Abby's sister, Victoria Newman Abbott joined the lawsuit and seemingly hijacked the case away from Abby. Regardless, Vance sparred off with Victor's longtime attorney, Michael Baldwin, regarding the operations of Newman Enterprises and the trust funds of Victoria and Abby. Adam Newman ended up testifying for Victor in his trial to suggest while he was CEO of Newman Enterprises, he forged trust documents. Thus, Victor had no idea of what was real or not. However, Neil Winters disproved Adam's testimony, and each of the three Newman children won $500 million each. Nicholas Newman joined his sisters in their lawsuit against their father upon finding out that Victor was lying about his involvement with Skye Newman.

Around the same time, Skye disappeared and Adam, who was back in a romance with Sharon Newman, was accused of her murder. With little money left, Sharon offered to pay for his legal fees and brought in Vance and his new legal partner, Leslie Michaelson. When Adam testified for Victor against his siblings wishes, Leslie was shocked to see Adam, but he learned that as a part of this deal, Victor pledged to come forward to the DA regarding his involvement in Sharon's case and would win a trust of his own. After some detective work by Sharon, Adam's charges were dropped, but as a result of her work, she was now accused of murder. In Hawaii, Sharon found Skye, but after an argument, Skye fell to her death in a volcano. It was soon discovered by Adam, Jack, and Phyllis Summers that Victor set Skye up in Hawaii and he was in Hawaii when Sharon was there to make sure no one learned the truth. In Sharon's trial, despite the testimony of Victor, and Vance's sharp legal tactics, Sharon was found guilty. Adam feared that this would happen, so he secretly arranged for her to escape afterward. Upon escaping, she was car-jacked and presumed to be dead after the carjackers got into a serious accident. Vance was not involved in any legal cases after Sharon's murder trial. When Sharon was found alive in New Mexico and brought back to Genoa City for sentencing, Victor hired a new lawyer, Avery Bailey Clark, to help get Sharon out of prison.

== Blake Joseph ==
Blake Joseph
- The Young and the Restless character
- Portrayed by: Paul Leyden
- Duration: 2010–11
- First appearance: October 6, 2010
- Last appearance: February 2, 2011
- Introduced by: Maria Arena Bell
In-universe information
- Occupation: Worked for Colin Atkinson

Blake Joseph first appeared October 6, 2010, harassing Cane Ashby and his family. He was portrayed by Australian actor Paul Leyden, who as well known for a role on As the World Turns he also had guest roles in Home and Away and BeastMasters. Casting for the role was announced on September 6, 2010. It was also speculated (which came true) that his storyline would be about Cane (Daniel Goddard)'s "Australian Adventure".

Blake came to town from Australia and was watching Cane's family. He disguised himself as a police officer when Cane took his wife Lily to the cottage to hide out. Blake told Cane the organization back in Australia wanted five million dollars from him in payback. When Cane devised a plan to extort the money from McCall Unlimited, Blake began posing as a consultant named James Collier to enable the scam. He has tried to insinuate himself into Lily's good graces. Blake was revealed to be Colin (Cane's father)'s henchmen. Blake ended up shooting Caleb who he believed was Cane at the time.

== Colin Atkinson ==
Colin Atkinson
- The Young and the Restless character
- Portrayed by: Tristan Rogers
- Duration: 2010–2012, 2014–2017, 2019, 2025
- First appearance: December 8, 2010
- Last appearance: August 26, 2025
- Introduced by: Maria Arena Bell
In-universe information
- Occupation: Crime boss Businessman
- Wife: Genevieve Atkinson (divorced); Jill Abbott (2011, 2014–2019)
- Sons: Cane Ashby; Caleb Atkinson
- Daughters: Samantha Atkinson
- Grandsons: Charlie Ashby; Sam Ashby
- Granddaughters: Mattie Ashby

Colin Atkinson first appeared on December 8, 2010, as the estranged biological father of Cane Ashby, portrayed by Tristan Rogers who previously was well known for his role as Robert Scorpio on General Hospital. TV Guide announced Rogers' casting on October 25, 2010. Prior to his appearance, he was described as "a mysterious and charming stranger named Colin who comes to Genoa City with a dark secret and a threatening agenda". He began taping with The Young and the Restless on October 27. His storyline was equally to "charm his way into Jill Abbott's heart." By September 2011, it was announced that Rogers would be leaving The Young and the Restless. Of his exit, Rogers said he had nothing but positive things to say and that it was a great experience. He also said that the exit came as a shock to him. In March 2012, it was announced that Rogers was to make a recurring return, however only made one appearance on May 8, 2012. In November 2013, it was announced that Rogers would be making another return to the role. He returned on February 5, 2014. On January 5, 2015, Rogers revealed he re-signed to the series for another year. However, in August 2015, Rogers was demoted back to recurring status.

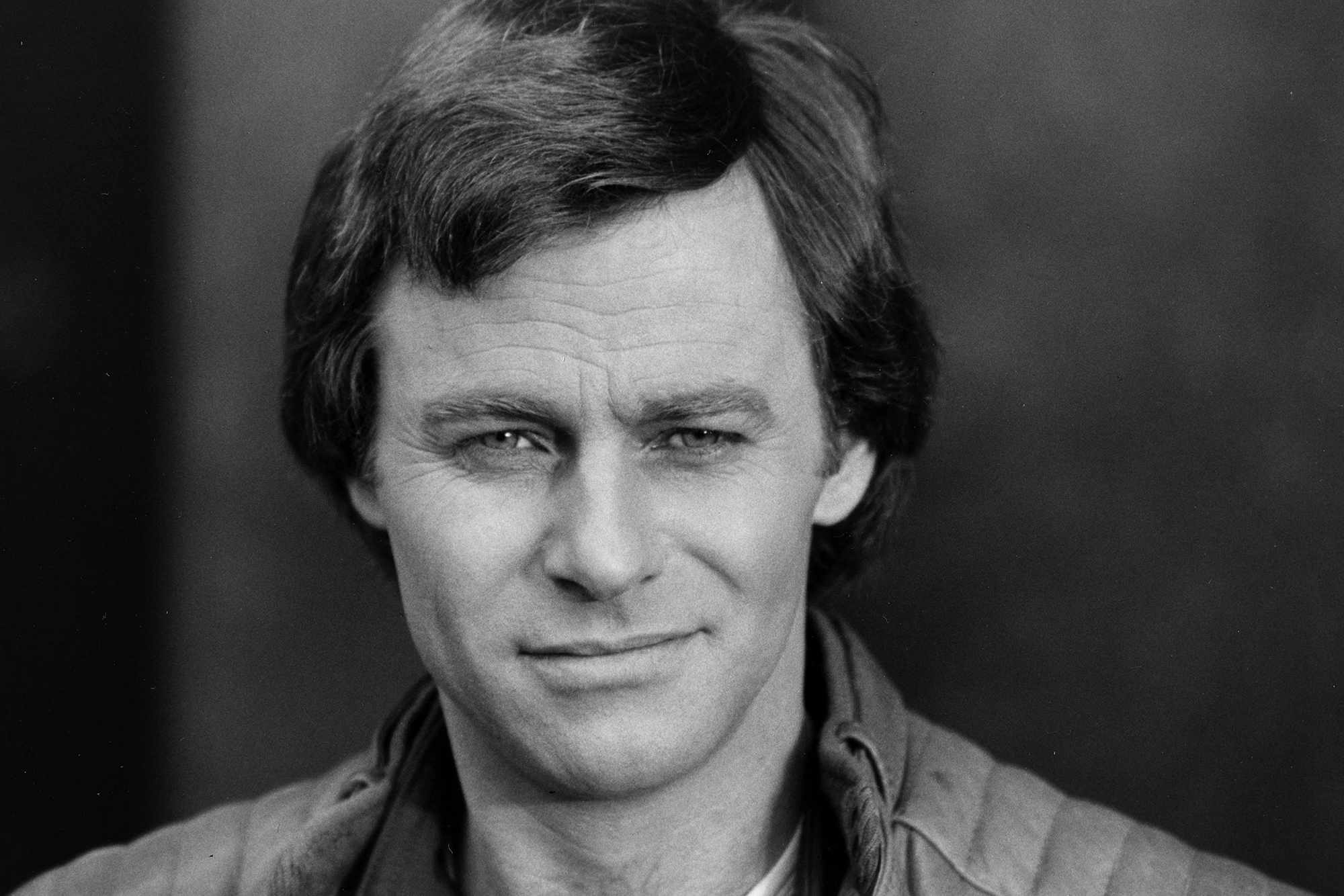
Tristan Rogers portrayed the role of Colin Atkinson

Colin arrived in Genoa City after being released from prison in Australia. He consulted with Blake Joseph, who has been keeping an eye on Cane. Colin became acquainted with Cane's adoptive mother Jill Abbott and she gave him information about Cane, without knowing who he truly was. Cane and Colin met after years, and both refused to tell anybody else (including Cane's wife, Lily Winters) about their connection. Colin wanted Cane to get involved with the family crime organization in Australia gain, or he would reveal Cane's "troubling" past. It is revealed Cane had a sister, Samantha, who died years ago. Jill and Colin have sex and later fall deeply in love (despite Colin using her) and as they wed Cane is shot by Blake (while rushing to the church to stop the wedding) and "died". Colin actually was deeply saddened, as he didn't want Cane to be killed but just manipulated and he comforted Jill too. Cane's divorce appears to Lily, however it was later revealed that the "ghost" was Cane's twin brother Caleb. Once again, this storyline was reversed, and it was revealed the ghost was in fact Cane, alive and the person that was shot was Caleb. During this storyline, Colin's estranged wife, Genevieve returned to Genoa City, wanting revenge on Colin. He later falls off the balcony at Genevieve's mansion, and was sent to hospital, and later arrested for his crimes. He was released and determined to get Jill back and divorced Genevieve after it was revealed they were still legally married. However, Jill constantly rejected him. Colin had sex with Genevieve for comfort, and Genevieve told Jill about this, putting an end to any sort of reunion between Jill and Colin. Genevieve however moved on with no problem, with businessman Jack Abbott. Colin was also locked in Genevieve's wine cellar, and this led Jill to believe that he was overseas with Genevieve. The combination to get out of the cellar was the date that they (Genevieve and Colin) had first consummated their relationship with lovemaking.

For a long time, Cane had been working with Ronan Malloy to expose Colin, as Cane thought Colin was setting up a scheme to kill Genevieve and even Gloria Abbott Bardwell. He set up a fake phone call to get Gloria to Genevieve's house, however, due to a family crisis, Gloria had to cancel. Cane's ex-wife Lily soon calls Genevieve and asks her if she can come over to her house to talk. However, when Lily arrives, an explosion, caused and set up by Colin, occurs. Cane rushes Lily out of the burning house, thus saving her life. Genevieve, who wasn't home at the time, gets a call from firefighters moments later. During this entire time, Colin was with Jill in his suite at the Genoa City Athletic Club, while Jill had handcuffed him to the bed, trying to get the truth out of him. Jill, eventually realizes that he can't be trusted and calls Ronan, who arrests him. Meanwhile, Genevieve rushes to the hospital to check on her housekeeper Myrna (who had never been seen, only mentioned), who was in the house at the time of the explosion. Colin is sentenced to time in prison, deported and jailed in Australia. In May 2012, Genevieve received a phone call from Colin in which he stated he had been released from jail and was somewhere comfy and cozy in the world.

In February 2014, Jill is abruptly kidnapped from the Chancellor Mansion grounds. It is revealed that Colin kidnapped her as he is facing deportation and he needs her to marry him again for him to stay in the country. She refuses, but he alludes that he knows the truth behind the mystery of a music box Katherine left to Jill before she died. As a result, Jill marries Colin again and they return to Genoa City, where Jill lies to her loved ones by saying she fell in love with Colin all over again and remarried him.

He shortly returned in September 2016, and found out that Jill knew about Phyllis and Billy's affair. He offered Jack Abbott to reveal something a secret about his wife for $1 million. Jack firstly refuses the offer but eventually comes back to Colin with a bag of cash to discover the truth.

Jill and Colin briefly separated in 2017 after he emptied her personal bank account.

In June 2025, it is revealed that Colin had died due to an illness and made amends with Cane. Before his death, he helped Cane build his successful empire under the pseudonym of Aristotle Dumas.
