= Billy Flynn (actor) =

American actor and producer

- Born: William Flynn; May 29, 1985 (age 41); St. Francis, Minnesota, U.S.
- Education: St. Cloud State University
- Occupations: Actor; producer
- Years active: 2013–present
- Agent: PCM International
- Height: 1.83 m (6 ft 0 in)
- Spouse: Gina Comparetto (m. 2016)
- Children: 3

William Flynn (born May 29, 1985) is an American actor and producer. He is recognized for portraying Chad DiMera on the soap opera Days of Our Lives. and he plays Cane Ashby on the soap opera The Young and Restless .

== Early life ==
Flynn was born in St. Francis, Minnesota. He graduated from St. Cloud State University in 2007, majoring in finance and minoring in economics. In the same year Flynn did an internship and worked at Accenture as a financial analyst. In 2010, he took a job as an analyst at Warner Bros. Studios, where he worked for four years.

== Career ==
Flynn is managed by PCM International. He moved to Los Angeles to pursue an acting career. Before making his acting debut, Flynn worked with director Jake Scott in 2013, by appearing in a Taco Bell commercial. In the same year, he made his acting debut as Liret in the short movie 80 in 10. He did a campaign of "Silk" for photographer Bryony Shearmur.

In February 2014, Flynn had a guest role on the CBS television series Hawaii Five-0, in the episode "Hoku Welowelo". Flynn played Nick Spitz, opposite Melanie Griffith. Flynn also co-produced a short movie, Solely. In August of the same year, it was announced he had joined the cast of Days of Our Lives as a recast of Chad DiMera; he made his first episodic appearance on September 12, 2014. In October 2016, Deadline Hollywood confirmed that Flynn had booked a role in the thriller movie D.O.A. Blood River.

In March 2025, Flynn announced he would depart Days of Our Lives and had joined the cast of The Young and the Restless. He made his first episodic debut on June 19, in the role of Aristotle Dumas—the pseudonym of Cane Ashby. Due to the former's advanced taping schedule, he continued being seen as Chad until March 2026.

== Personal life ==
Flynn became engaged to Gina Comparetto on May 29, 2015, his 30th birthday. He and Comparetto married on October 1, 2016. Together, they have 3 children. In a 2021 episode of Maurice Benard's program State of Mind, Flynn acknowledged battling substance addiction.

== Filmography ==
Film roles
| Year | Title | Role | Notes | Ref. |
|---|---|---|---|---|
| 2013 | 80 in 10 | Liret | Short film | |
| 2014 | Solely | Michael | Short film | |
| 2017 | Dead on Arrival | Sam Collins | | |
| 2017 | Escape Room | Victor | | |
| 2021 | Days of Our Lives: A Very Salem Christmas | Chad DiMera | Peacock Original Movie | |
| TBA | Willowbrook | Kyle | Post-production | |

Television roles
| Year | Title | Role | Notes | Ref. |
|---|---|---|---|---|
| 2014 | Hawaii Five-0 | Nick Spitz | Season four, episode 16 | |
| 2014–2026 | Days of Our Lives | Chad DiMera | Series regular | |
| 2021 | Days of Our Lives: Beyond Salem | Chad DiMera | Limited series; season one | |
| 2025–present | The Young and the Restless | Cane Ashby | Series regular | |

== Awards and nominations ==
| Year | Award | Category | Work | Result | Ref. |
|---|---|---|---|---|---|
| 2017 | Daytime Emmy Award | Outstanding Lead Actor in a Drama Series | Days of Our Lives | Nominated | |
| 2019 | Daytime Emmy Award | Outstanding Lead Actor in a Drama Series | Days of Our Lives | Nominated | |
| 2023 | Daytime Emmy Award | Outstanding Lead Actor in a Drama Series | Days of Our Lives | Nominated | |

| Preceded by Casey Deidrick | Chad DiMera (role); 2014–26 | Succeeded by Connor Floyd |
| Preceded by Daniel Goddard | Cane Ashby (role); 2025–present | Incumbent |
