= Tucker McCall =

Character from The Young and the Restless

- The Young and the Restless character
- Trevor St. John as Tucker McCall
- Portrayed by: William Russ (2009–2010); Stephen Nichols (2010–2013); Trevor St. John (2022–2024)
- Duration: 2009–2013; 2022–2024
- First appearance: December 2, 2009
- Last appearance: June 18, 2024
- Created by: Maria Arena Bell, Hogan Sheffer and Scott Hamner
- Introduced by: Maria Arena Bell and Paul Rauch (2009); Anthony Morina and Josh Griffith (2022)
- Stephen Nichols as Tucker McCall
In-universe information
- Occupation: Businessman
- Family: Chancellor
- Parents: Arthur Hendricks; Katherine Chancellor
- Half-brothers: Brock Reynolds
- Spouse: Ashley Abbott (2011–2012, 2023–2024)
- Children: Devon Hamilton
- Stepchildren: Abby Newman (2011–2012, 2023–2024)
- Grandchildren: Dominic Abbott Newman Winters Chancellor
- Nieces and nephews: Mackenzie Browning

Tucker McCall is a fictional character from The Young and the Restless, an American soap opera on the CBS network. Introduced by former head writer Maria Arena Bell, the character debuted during the episode airing on December 2, 2009, portrayed by William Russ. The character was slated to be a new businessman and billionaire, leading to speculation that Tucker would become a replacement character for icon Victor Newman (Eric Braeden), as Braeden's future with the series was in jeopardy at the time. However, Tucker ended up being a new character who would be revealed as Katherine Chancellor's (Jeanne Cooper) long lost son. Russ was let go shortly after his debut because producers wanted to take the character in a different direction, resulting in the hiring of Stephen Nichols as his replacement. After nearly a decade hiatus, McCall returned to the show. From 2022 to 2024, McCall was portrayed by former OLTL actor, Trevor St. John.

The character then became involved with Ashley Abbott (Eileen Davidson) and the two were later married; their union ended after a year due to Tucker's adultery. In 2011, it was revealed that Tucker was the previously unknown father of Devon Hamilton (Bryton James), which also revealed a long ago affair with Yolanda Hamilton (Debbi Morgan); a plot that was met with positive reviews. While several television critics were surprised by the decision to replace Russ with Nichols, the actor was well received throughout his run. In December 2012, it was announced that Nichols had been let go from the soap opera; he made his final appearance on January 29, 2013. In September 2022, Trevor St. John assumed the role of Tucker.

== Casting ==
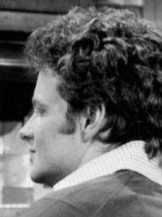
William Russ (pictured in 1977) originated the role of Tucker McCall.

In October 2009, it was announced that William Russ would be joining the cast of The Young and the Restless as Tucker McCall, a billionaire. Initially, Russ' casting was questioned by the press due to the lack of information on the character and the unsuccessful contract negotiations between Sony Pictures Television and Eric Braeden, who portrays icon businessman Victor Newman. Speculation arose that the producers were attempting to recast Victor or looking for a character to replace him, but Tucker ended up being a completely new character. Russ made his debut on December 2, 2009. Weeks after his debut, it was announced that Russ had been replaced by soap opera veteran Stephen Nichols. Former executive producer and head writer Maria Arena Bell released a statement concerning the casting switch, saying that Russ is a "talented actor" and they "enjoyed working with him", but they had decided to take the character in a "different direction". Bell and co-executive producer Paul Rauch stated that Nichols brought many "complexities, a strength, sexuality, and drama to this character". Afterward, Nelson Branco of TV Guide revealed that former vice president of CBS Daytime, Barbara Bloom, wanted Nichols for the role from the start. Nichols made his debut on January 27, 2010. In December 2012, it was announced that Nichols had been let go from the soap opera and had taped his final scenes. He made his final appearance on January 29, 2013. In May, following the death of Jeanne Cooper, several sources reported that the soap opera planned to recast the role, however, the producers decided against an immediate recast and believed it would be too much of a distraction.

In August 2022, it was reported former One Life to Live actor, Trevor St. John, was cast in an unknown role. One month later, it was reported St. John would be playing a recast Tucker; debuting on September 28, 2022.

== Character development ==
The soap opera's official website describes the character as the "powerful millionaire-tycoon with a secret agenda to take everything from his long-lost mother Katherine Chancellor (Jeanne Cooper)." Nichols describes Tucker as "a self-made success, a regular guy who can tend bar and shoot pool and talk shit with anybody. He's very unassuming in many ways." Nichols stated that he doesn't consider Tucker a villain, but considers him a "player". Following the reveal that Katherine was Tucker's long lost mother, Nichols was asked if Tucker has abandonment issues, to which he stated: "He has all that stuff, but he has found a way to create a very strong armor. He doesn’t let it break very often. He does not let anyone see his true feelings, and I think the reason he is such a player is, and it’s my take on it now, is that it’s for that very reason. He does not want to get close to anyone. He does not want to get hurt." In a separate interview, the actor stated: "Family and Katherine in particular means more to Tucker than he is willing to admit and his feelings for Katherine are sneaking up on him." He also described the character as "very, very cool, and "full of a lot of fire and a lot of surprises".

The character's main love interest throughout his duration on the soap opera was Ashley Abbott (Eileen Davidson), whom he married in 2011. Nichols had previously stated in an interview that he thought Tucker would "definitely 'team up' when he finds the right woman". Davidson stated in an interview that the pair will "have their ups and downs, but they're definitely in each other's lives." In September 2011, it is revealed that Tucker is the biological father of Devon Hamilton (Bryton James), the result of a long-ago affair with Harmony Hamilton (Debbi Morgan). When asked of Tucker's reaction to the news, Morgan stated: "It's revealed that Devon was the result of a one-night stand between Harmony and Tucker. That night meant the world to her—Tucker was the love of her life—but it meant so little to him that he doesn't even recognize Harmony when they meet again. Not a clue! It's like a dagger through her heart." James said he was "overjoyed" at the revelation, stating: "There's so much they can do with this story. The relationship between Tucker and Devon—my character allowing that relationship to grow. How it affects Neil. And there's a plethora of possibilities that can come from his relationship with Mrs. Chancellor. I'm sure that relationship will develop just as it will with Devon and Tucker. And then, there's Devon's mother, Harmony, who is back." Tucker and Ashley's marriage ended the following year, after he cheated on her with Harmony. Following their divorce, Nichols stated in an interview with Xfinity that Tucker would "have to find a new woman" as he "can't be without female companionship".

== Storylines ==
=== Backstory ===
Tucker was born on September 29, 1957, and raised by a poor family in Ohio. As a teenager, he falls in love with a girl named Genevieve (Genie Francis), who ends up breaking his heart by running off to Australia with Colin Atkinson (Tristan Rogers). After his adoptive parents are unable to send him to college, Tucker travels to Europe in hopes of making a name for himself, while being homeless. In the 1970s, he becomes a manager for a rock band, known as "Mick" to his closest friends. He shared one-night stands with several groupies whose names he didn't know. A groupie named Candy Cane would later contact him, saying she gave birth to his son but refused to let Tucker see him. He spent years looking for his son but was unsuccessful.

=== 2009–2013 ===
In December 2009, Tucker is introduced as J.T. Hellstrom’s (Thad Luckinbill) employer, while pursuing a business deal with Katherine Chancellor (Jeanne Cooper) and beginning an affair with Jill Abbott (Jess Walton). Tucker secretly gains control of Katherine's company, Chancellor Industries, after she buys stock in a dummy corporation and at a shareholders' meeting, Tucker reveals that he is Kay's long-lost son, and he was behind a woman named Jojo Glover pretending to be her daughter. After years of planning, Tucker had finally gotten his revenge on Katherine for giving him away and he begins slowly dismantling Chancellor Industries by selling its subsidiaries. Meanwhile, Katherine's other son, Brock Reynolds (Beau Kazer) advises Tucker to get to know their mother, but Katherine refuses to accept him, and Tucker is hurt. He hires Adam Newman (Michael Muhney) and plans to sell off Chancellor Industries piece by piece, including Jabot Cosmetics. Adam's father Victor Newman (Eric Braeden) wins Jabot in a bidding war; Tucker refuses to hire Jill at Chancellor Industries. Katherine threatens to reveal Tucker's bribing of Alexander Thomas until she begins feeling guilty and backs off; an impressed Tucker puts a hold on the selling of her company. While Katherine and Tucker bond, he asks about his father, Arthur Hendricks (David Hedison), while Jill finds the information on Tucker and runs it in Restless Style magazine. Tucker and Katherine come to an agreement where she gets 51% of Chancellor Industries, but Tucker mistakenly believes Jill and Katherine were working together, and he promises to dismantle the company before their agreement comes into effect. Thanks to Jill, Tucker is investigated by the SEC while he bonds with Ashley Abbott (Eileen Davidson), who is struggling with letting go of the child she thought was her daughter. Tucker supports her, much to the dismay of her boyfriend, Neil Winters (Kristoff St. John), while he announces his plans to purchase Jabot for himself. Tucker blackmails Katherine into giving him back control of Jabot in exchange for him keeping quiet about Adam giving Victor access to the bids and he offers Ashley the CEO position.

Tucker asks J. T. to help him acquire Newman Enterprises cosmetics subsidiary, Beauty of Nature, while Ashley accepts the CEO position at Jabot. While urging J. T. to get information on Beauty of Nature's deal with a Japanese department store, he lets Ashley in on his and her brother Jack's (Peter Bergman) plans to obtain Beauty of Nature. Ashley and Tucker go to Japan and discover Victor's daughter, Victoria Newman (Amelia Heinle), bribing the Japanese Minister of Zoning with an antique gun. They commiserate over how their mother's abandoned them and make love for the first time. However, Ashley still wants to be with Neil and Tucker decides to give her some space. When Neil breaks up with Ashley, Tucker tries to cheer her up. With help from Jill, Tucker and Ashley confront Victor about Victoria bribing the Japanese official with the antique gun. However, Ashley decides against turning Victor into the feds to protect the company and her daughter, and Tucker agrees to obtain Beauty of Nature another way. Tucker supports Ashley when she must testify against Adam and helps Ashley get past her insecurities about their relationship as well her ability to work as CEO. Tucker goes ahead with his plan, and makes Jack co-CEO despite their plans for BON being stalled and they discuss using Abby to get to Victor. Despite being rejected by her family, Tucker supports Katherine when her great-grandson Chance Chancellor (John Driscoll) is presumed dead. Meanwhile, Katherine warns Tucker that she will back Victor in Abby's lawsuit and Abby becomes suspicious of Tucker when she sees him comforting Jill due Katherine cutting both of them out when her husband, Murphy (Michael Fairman), is hospitalized. Tucker is about to hire Diane Jenkins (Maura West) and they end up sleeping together; however he changes his mind when he learns that Diane lied about her previous job. Victoria reveals that she is pursuing Beauty of Nature in the lawsuit and she promises to sell it to him, on the condition that she is the CEO of the newly merged cosmetics company. Tucker buys Abby a horse for her birthday, her parents disapprove and he and Ashley get engaged on Christmas Eve.

When the Newmans win their lawsuit, Katherine decides to help Victor get Beauty of Nature back for Victor. In May 2011, Tucker ends up in a coma after being run down by a drunken Abby and Ashley takes the blame. Tucker signed a DNR but Katherine and Ashley keep Tucker from being taken off life support and Katherine is left in charge of McCall Unlimited. Tucker's living will also reveals that he has a son who stands to inherit 20 million dollars if he is found. Meanwhile, Katherine reverses all of Tucker's most recent business decisions and he and Ashley marry when he wakes up from his coma. Though Tucker is physically recovered, he lost all of his business sense and Ashley must run the company in secret until he recovers fearing Katherine may try to take his company again. Afterward, Tucker is one of several suspects when Diane is murdered and he fires Devon Hamilton (Bryton James), from his record label. In turn Katherine launches her own record label as a subsidiary of Chancellor Industries and hires Devon to run it. Tucker teams up with Jack again to overturn the sale of Jabot and a shocked Katherine ends up in the hospital after a stroke. Tucker accidentally learns from Jill that Devon is his son, and Devon refuses to accept Tucker as his new father, and disowns Katherine for hiding the truth. Meanwhile, Devon's formerly drug addicted mother, now known as Harmony (Debbi Morgan), returns to Genoa City to explain her reasons for hiding Devon's paternity. Tucker stands in as the godfather of Moses Winters, the son of his longtime friend and confidant, Sofia Dupre (Julia Pace Mitchell). Tucker does his best to build a relationship with his son, but Devon constantly rejects him. He and Ashley later renew their vows and Devon finally lets his guard down and comes to the wedding.

Tucker and Devon continue to bond over their shared interest in music while Tucker manages to put aside his differences with Katherine. He and Harmony later find a specialist to operate on Devon to fully repair his hearing. Afterward, Ashley and Tucker begin having marital problems when it is revealed that Tucker had a relationship with Genevieve Atkinson, Jack's ex-fiancée, when they were teens. Ashley decides they need a break and before leaving town, she catches Tucker and Harmony in bed and files for divorce. Tucker's actions destroy all the progress he's made with Devon, but the two manage to rebuild their relationship. Tucker supports Ashley when Abby is supposedly kidnapped and they even share a kiss but Ashley still serves him with divorce papers. Tucker then began to advise Sharon Newman (Sharon Case) to take more power at Newman Enterprises, as Victor had disappeared after their wedding. She takes over as CEO while beginning an affair with Tucker; in reality, Tucker had hired Genevieve to find Victor and keep him away from Genoa City so Tucker can buy up all of the Newman Enterprises stock. Once Victor was presumed dead in Los Angeles, Sharon decided to marry Tucker, but Genevieve turned her back on Tucker and brought Victor back alive, who stopped the wedding. With Victor alive, Jack was forced to sell all of his Newman stock as well as Beauty of Nature to Tucker to make his margin call. Yet, Jack, with Genevieve's help, tried to blackmail Tucker to win back Beauty of Nature or else the SEC would investigate his recent actions. Tucker decided to face the SEC and sell Beauty of Nature back to Victor to stop Victor from pursuing continuing a criminal investigation into Sharon's actions. Victor agreed to Tucker's deal but an unaware Sharon went to the SEC and told them of the shell corporations Tucker set up to secretly buy up Newman stock. Victor informed Sharon of his deal with Tucker and she rushed to his office only to find Tucker being arrested by the SEC and FBI as she apologized to Tucker as he was led away asking if Sharon was responsible for his arrest. He was eventually released after Sharon recanted her story to the SEC. Jill later tried to convince Katherine to forgive Tucker, which she eventually did. After they became on better terms, Tucker announced he was moving to Hong Kong, leaving Katherine devastated. Tucker and Katherine are reunited just before she passes away. According to Devon, Katherine's death hits Tucker a lot harder than he would like to admit. Tucker is so devastated that he cannot attend Katherine's funeral. Katherine leaves Tucker her record collection saying music was his first and true passion.

=== 2022–present ===
Tucker returns to Genoa City, meeting up with Diane (Susan Walters) in her hotel room before taking a helicopter to Kyle Abbott and Summer Newman's vow renewal at the Abbott mansion.

== Reception ==
"Instead of dragging the story line out for years, Tucker discovered the news pretty quickly and has had to deal with the ramifications of not putting his considerable assets toward finding his son, while PI Paul, who Katherine probably hired for a chicken dinner, solved the case in a matter of days. In one fell swoop, there's another layer to the discontent between mother and son (Katherine hid the truth from Tucker) and Devon's had to cope with learning he's the child of billionaires, not to mention it brought Debbi Morgan (Yolanda/Harmony) into the fold. Indeed, this twist promises years of rich story to come."

— Yahoo! TV, praising the revelation that Tucker is Devon Hamilton's biological father (2011)

Roger Newcomb and Matt Richenthal, writing for websites We Love Soaps and TV Fanatic respectively, both described the decision to replace Russ with Nichols as surprising. Allison Waldman of AOL TV said the recast was "bad news", as Russ was "doing just fine as Tucker McCall, new billionaire in Genoa City". However, she also wrote that the role would be "better suited" for Nichols with Tucker becoming more of a "romantic figure". Tara Blake of TVSource speculated that the character would be tied to a "major Genoa City player" and that was the reason for the recast. Gwen Morrett of About.com said that Nichols joining The Young and the Restless was "truly their gain" from Days of Our Lives (where the actor had previously portrayed Steve Johnson). Upon Nichols' debut, Megan Lynn of SoapNet wrote: "Stephen certainly has soap experience — he's previously played Steve Johnson on Days of our Lives and Stefan Cassadine on General Hospital, but then again – we were kind of warming up to William." Michael Fairman of On-Air On-Soaps wrote of the decision to hire Nichols onto the series: "This week, daytime fans get one of their wishes, to see Stephen Nichols back on daytime. From his role as Stefan on GH to Patch on DAYS, you know that Stephen Nichols is going to play Tucker for all he is worth, and then some." In August 2010, Tommy Garrett of Canyon News wrote of Nichols' portrayal, saying: "Now going into the 21st century, Stephen has reinvented another part of himself and inhabits Genoa City as the town’s newest and most handsome billionaire on CBS’s number-one daytime drama The Young and the Restless."

Nekeeta Borden of Zap2it was favorable of the early pairing of Tucker and Ashley, giving them an "honorable mention" on a list of "curiously quirky couplings". Candace Young of the website She Knows Soaps wrote that, "Ashley and Tucker have been interesting as a power couple, if you will, in business and the corporate world." In January 2011, Garrett awarded Nichols a "Leading Men Gold Standard" and praised his portrayal that week, writing: "Stephen Nichols as Tucker was all over the place this week. Initially Tucker decided to back the recording label of Devon Winters and Noah Newman. Nichols played a man who wanted to help two young men break into the music industry. However, the shocking news that Cane and Sofia have been lying to Tucker and allowing a conman to swindle Tucker’s company was destined to be revealed. Although the climax came at the end of the week, the intensity in which Stephen Nichols played the revelation was exciting to say the least. Fans know that next week Tucker McCall’s going to cause heads to roll." Jae Jones of Yahoo! praised the storyline revealing Tucker as Devon's father as it gave the soap opera's matriarch, Katherine, a biracial grandson. She wrote: "What seems to make the story line even more interesting is the fact that she has a biracial grandson. Who would have ever thought the show could catch up with the current times? There are not too many daytime soaps left for housewives and house husbands to enjoy, but those who watch this show are always in for a special treat each afternoon." They later named the storyline the "best reveal" of 2011.

In May 2012, when speculation arose that a male star would be exiting the soap opera, Sara Bibel of Xfinity wrote that it could be Tucker, saying: "Who despite being played by one of daytime’s most popular actor's [sic] has never really gelled with the audience. His recent one night stand with Harmony leaves him hated by pretty much everyone in Genoa City." Of the possible pairing between Tucker and Sharon Newman (Sharon Case), Luke Kerr (also of Zap2it) wrote: "Billionaire Tucker McCall (Stephen Nichols) is the latest white knight to ride in and save Sharon Newman (Sharon Case) from herself on The Young and the Restless. Granted, Genoa City's answer to Sir Richard Branson has ulterior motives, but there's no denying the two share at least a little chemistry." During a storyline in which Tucker attempted to take over Newman Enterprises, Jamey Giddens (also of Zap2it) wrote, "You know, I'm starting to dig ol' Tucker." When Nichols was let go from the soap opera, Giddens wrote, "Daytime television's answer to Richard Branson is no more." Bibel wrote: "The billionaire who turned out to be Katherine’s long lost son and Devon’s father suffered from inconsistent writing throughout his three year tenure on the show." In 2024, as part of their year-end review, Soap Opera News editor Michael Thomas listed St. John's exit as Tucker as their fourth most-shocking soap opera exit of the year.
