= Stephen Nichols =

American actor (born 1951)

- Born: Stephen Earl Nichols; February 19, 1951 (age 75); Cincinnati, Ohio, U.S.
- Years active: 1978–present
- Spouse: Lisa Gordon (m. 1984)
- Children: 3

Stephen Earl Nichols (born February 19, 1951) is an American television actor who is recognized for his roles on various daytime soap operas. He has portrayed Steve "Patch" Johnson on NBC's Days of Our Lives on and off since 1985. In 1996, he joined the cast of ABC's General Hospital as Stefan Cassadine; he exited the role in 2003. From 2009 to 2013, he portrayed the role of Tucker McCall on The Young and the Restless.

Stephen Nichols has three children: Vanessa, Aaron, and Dylan. All three children have had small parts on Days of Our Lives. Nichols’ son, Aaron, played young Steve Johnson. Nichols’ daughter, Dylan, has a burgeoning music career. Nichols has two grandchildren.

== Career ==
After turning down an art scholarship to Ohio State University, he traveled west, studied yoga and lived as a monk while preparing vegetarian meals for the monks and nuns in a Hollywood ashram.

After three years of celibacy, a steady diet of ice cream and the films of Truffaut and Bergman, he landed at the Theater Academy of Los Angeles City College where he studied for two years. Nichols went on to study with Stella Adler, Jack Colvin and Harry Mastrorgeorge.

For his stage work, Nichols has been honored with three Drama-Logue Awards and two LA Weekly Theater Awards for his performances in such notable productions as Pieces of Time (for his portrayal of real-life killer, Donald Bashor), for Delirious (directed by Ron Link), and as Jim Morrison in the last thirty-six hours of his life in The Lizard King. Nichols also appeared at LATC in Rick Clutchey's The Cage, in the award-winning production of Michael Cristofer's The Shadow Box at Theater East and Love Letters, during its initial run at the Canon Theater.

Most recently, Nichols appeared in He Hunts at the Geffen Playhouse and was seen in the U.S. première of Joe Pintaro's The Dead Boy, for which Nichols received a Maddy Award.

=== Days of Our Lives ===
His portrayal of Steve "Patch" Johnson (1985–90) earned him an Emmy nomination for Outstanding Actor in a Leading Role and five Soap Opera Digest Best Actor Awards. The characters Steve and Kayla (Mary Beth Evans) have been a frequently featured couple on Days of our Lives ever. Nichols talked about one of their favorite storylines and shared, “Mary Beth likes Emily and Gideon. It was a fantasy, it wasn’t really us, but we were reading this beautiful diary, in the old mansion, and then it would flash to the characters.”

Nichols returned to the role of Steve (Patch) Johnson on Days of Our Lives in 2006, and played the role until 2009.

On April 17, 2015, it was reported that Nichols would return as reprise the role of Steve "Patch" Johnson of NBC's Days of our Lives and Nichols second return air date on September 15. He continues to play the role as of April 2025.

From December 2019-January 2020, Nichols played the role of Stefano DiMera as part of a storyline where Dr. Wilhelm Rolf implanted a chip into Steve Johnson's brain that turned him into "the new Stefano DiMera".

==== Other work ====
Nichols also portrayed Stefan Cassadine on the soap General Hospital (1996–2003). This role reunited him with Evans, while his character was later paired with Laura Spencer, played by Genie Francis.

Other TV appearances have included Matlock, L.A. Law, Diagnosis: Murder, The Nanny (with former Days of our Lives co-star Charles Shaughnessy), Second Chances, Sisters, a recurring role on Empty Nest, and playing Jesse James opposite Pierce Brosnan in the NBC mini-series Around the World in 80 Days.

Nichols has appeared in several feature films, first co-starring with Demi Moore in Choices. He was also in Witchboard; Soapdish with Kevin Kline, Whoopi Goldberg and Robert Downey, Jr.; Heaven's Tears; Cover Me with Paul Sorvino; Phoenix with Brad Dourif and William Sanderson; and the Showtime short A Hard Rain with John Mahoney, which earned best film honors at the British Film Festival for director Dennie Gordon.

Nichols has directed several stage productions, including Sixty Minutes from L.A., a presentation pilot for television, Wild Horses (co-director) and most recently, wrote and directed the dramatic short film Get the Dime starring Daniel Bess and Robert Picardo. Get the Dime was a director's pick at the Palm Springs International Festival of Short Films. Upcoming, Nichols will direct the feature films Eau de L.A. and Fear of Falling.

On December 17, 2009, it was reported on stephennichols.net and cbs.com that he had joined the cast of CBS's The Young and the Restless as Tucker McCall, replacing William Russ. Nichols's first air date was January 27, 2010. On Y&R, he would later be reunited with General Hospital counterpart Genie Francis, who played Genevieve Atkinson on the show. Nichols's last day on Y&R was January 29, 2013.

== Filmography ==
=== Film ===
Year	Title	Role
1978	A Different Story	Man at Bath
1981	Choices	Chris
1984	Killing Time	Jim
1985	House	Scott
1986	Witchboard	Brandon Sinclair
1991	Soapdish	Self
1994	A Hard Rain	Munson
1995	Cover Me	Dimitri
1995	Phoenix	Tyler McClain
1995	Heaven's Tears	Peter Steiner
1995	The Glass Cage	Renzi
1997	Deep Cover	Dutch Leonard
1998	Merchants of Venus	The Stud
2009	Get The Dime (Short Film)	Director, editor, writer
2014	I See (Short Film)	Director, editor
2019	A Beauty & The Beast Christmas	Howard

=== Television ===
Year	Title	Role	Notes
1981	Dynasty	Flight Attendant	Episode: "Oil: Part 1" (uncredited)
1983	Wizards and Warriors	Ogden	
1982–1983	Dallas	Paramedic	2 episodes
1985	T.J. Hooker	Tony Perino	Episode: "Street Bait"
1985	Crazy Like a Fox	Croiser	Episode: "The Geronimo Machine"
1985–90, 2006–09, 2015–	Days of Our Lives	Steve Johnson	Regular role
2019–20	Days of Our Lives	Stefano DiMera	Regular role
1989	Around the World in 80 Days	Jesse James	Episode 3
1990	Matlock	Cliff Lockwood	Episode: "The Biker"
1991	L.A. Law	Corrinne's Lawyer	Episode: "He's a Crowd"
1991	Shades of LA	Walt Canton	Episode: 'Burial Ground"
1992	Murder, She Wrote	Barry Carroll	Episode: "Danse Diabolique"
1992	FBI: The Untold Stories	William Timothy Kirk	
1992	2000 Malibu Road	Brad Dimitri	4 episodes
1992	Santa Barbara	Dr. Skyler Gates	Recurring role, 24 episodes
1993	Renegade	Steve Harris	Episode: "Endless Summer"
1993	Melrose Place	Carl Canin	Episode: "Collision Course"
1993	The Nanny	Brock Storm	Episode: "Personal Business"
1993–1994	Second Chances	Tommy Simmons	5 episodes
1994	In the Heat of the Night	Chuck Booker	Episode: "Conspiracy of One"
1994	Sisters	Steve	Episode: "Heroes"
1994	Diagnosis Murder	Miles Archer	Episode: "Georgia on My Mind"
1995	Empty Nest	Matt Kane	3 episodes
1997–2003	General Hospital	Stefan Cassidine	Regular role
1997–2003	Port Charles	Stefan Cassidine	
2002	She Spies	Kurt Maxim	
2009	Crash	Thigpen's Client	Episode: "You, I'll Be Following"
2010–2013	The Young and the Restless	Tucker McCall	Contract role
2022	Days of Our Lives: Beyond Salem	Steve Johnson	Chapter 2
2023	Body and Soul	Tucker McCall as Thrust Manning	a soap within a soap on Days of Our Lives

== See also ==
- Supercouple

Preceded by William Russ	Tucker McCall (role); 2010–13	Succeeded by Trevor St. John
Preceded by Joseph Mascolo	Stefano DiMera (role); 2019–20	None
