= Daniel Goddard (actor) =

Australian American actor and model (born 1971)

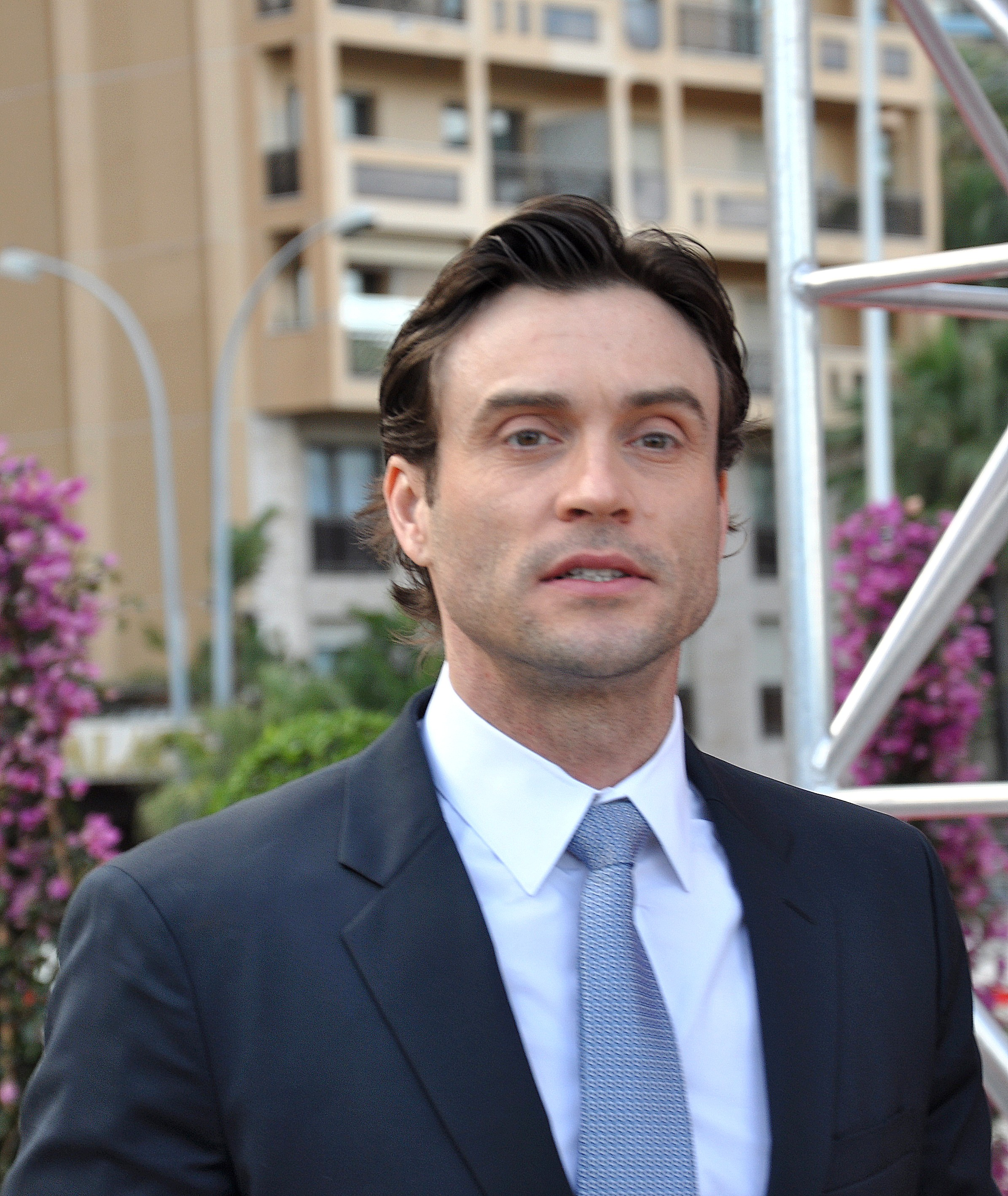
- Goddard in 2013
- Born: Daniel Richard Goddard; 28 August 1971 (age 55); Sydney, Australia
- Citizenship: Australia; United States
- Occupations: Actor, model
- Spouse: Rachael Marcus (m. 2002)
- Children: 2

Daniel Richard Goddard (born 28 August 1971) is an Australian-American actor and model. He is known for his starring role as Dar on the syndicated action drama BeastMaster, based on the 1982 film The Beastmaster, and for playing Cane Ashby on the CBS daytime soap opera The Young and the Restless from 2007 to 2019.

== Career ==
He had nearly completed a degree in finance, but he transferred to the Ensemble Actors Studio without finishing the degree. After several theatrical appearances, Goddard landed his first television role in the Australian soap opera Home and Away, as Eric Phillips.

Goddard then departed for Hollywood, modelling for Calvin Klein and Dolce & Gabbana. He landed the lead role of Dar on the series BeastMaster from 1999 to 2002, returning to his native country, Australia, to film the series.

In January 2007, he joined the cast of the American soap The Young and the Restless, playing the role of Cane Ashby. Owing to his popularity with the female audience, on occasion Goddard has modeled on another CBS Daytime television series, The Price Is Right. In October 2019, he announced he was leaving The Young and the Restless.

== Personal life ==
Goddard was born in Sydney, New South Wales, Australia. He married Rachael Marcus on 3 February 2002. They have two sons, born February 2006 and December 2008. On 12 June 2020, Goddard became an American citizen.

== Filmography ==
=== Actor ===
Television and film roles
| Year | Title | Role | Notes |
|---|---|---|---|
| 1995 | Home and Away | Eric Phillips | Guest Role: Season 8 (10 Episodes) |
| 1999–2002 | Beastmaster | Dar | Main Role: Seasons 1–3 (66 Episodes) |
| 2001 | South Pacific | N/A | Television film; uncredited |
| 2003 | Dream Warrior | Rage | Film |
| 2004 | Wild Card | Nigel | Episode: "Auntie Venom" |
| 2004 | Monk | Evan Coker | Episode: "Mr. Monk and the Captain's Wife" |
| 2005 | Age of Kali | N/A | Film |
| 2006 | Lightspeed | Python / Edward Bartlett | Television film |
| 2007 | These Boots Are Made for Walken | Bennie Brenner | Short film |
| 2007–2019 | The Young and the Restless | Cane Ashby | Main role (1169 Episodes) |
| 2009 | Immortally Yours | Alex Stone | Direct-to-DVD film; also known as Kiss of The Vampire |
| 2009 | The Perfect Sleep | Sergei | Film |
| 2025 | General Hospital | Henry Dalton | Recurring role (22 Episodes) |

=== Writer ===
| Year | Title | Notes |
|---|---|---|
| 2000–2002 | Beastmaster | 6 episodes |

| First | Cane Ashby (role); 2007–19 | Succeeded by Billy Flynn |
