= Maria Arena Bell =

American television writer and freelance writer

- Born: Maria Arena; March 10, 1963 (age 63)
- Occupations: Head writer; television producer
- Years active: 1988–present
- Known for: Former executive producer and head writer of The Young and the Restless
- Spouse(s): William J. Bell, Jr.
- Children: 2
- Relatives: William J. Bell (father-in-law); Lee Phillip Bell (mother-in-law); Bradley Bell (brother-in-law); Lauralee Bell (sister-in-law)

Maria Arena Bell (née Arena; born March 10, 1963) is an American novelist, television and freelance writer. She is the former head writer and executive producer of the CBS Daytime soap opera The Young and the Restless.

== Early life and education ==
Maria Arena grew up in Newport Beach, California and graduated from Newport Harbor High School in 1981. She received a Bachelor of Arts double degree in Fiction Writing and Art History from Northwestern University and did post graduate work in 19th Century Art.

== Career ==
Arena began her career as a fashion designer for a major Los Angeles based garment manufacturer.

In 1988, writer William J. Bell hired Arena for The Bold and the Beautiful in 1987. There, she created the character of Sally Spectra who was loosely based on her step-father who worked in the Los Angeles garment industry.

After leaving The Bold and the Beautiful, Arena developed television formats for CBS and NBC. She also worked as an essayist for publications such as The New York Times Style Magazine, "C" Magazine, Aspen Magazine, and Aspen Peak Magazine.

Bell returned to daytime television in December 2007 and was ultimately named sole head writer and became one of the show's executive producers alongside Paul Rauch. Formerly a member of Writers Guild of America West, she left and maintained financial core status during the 2007–08 Writers Guild of America strike. In 2011, she was awarded a Daytime Emmy Award alongside her writing team, in addition to a total of six nominations as writer and producer on the show. In 2012, Sony ended her contract as head writer.

In 2013, Arena Bell founded Vitameatavegamin Productions.

Arena Bell is a professor at Harvard University in their Extension Program.

== Philanthropy ==
Arena Bell is involved philanthropically in arts education organizations and is the former chair of PS Arts (2003–2013); the Museum of Contemporary Art, Los Angeles (2009–2014); and for a decade Americans For The Arts National Arts Awards and other organizations. In 2024, the 2028 Summer Olympics named her as chair of the Cultural Olympiad.

== Credits ==
The Bold and the Beautiful (credited as Maria Arena)

- Script Writer: April 13, 1989 – June 8, 1992
- Fashion Consultant: February 9 – October 17, 1989

The Young and the Restless

- Script Writer: 1990-92
- Co-head writer: December 26, 2007 - April 21, 2008 (with Josh Griffith) (chose financial core status during the WGA strike)
- Head writer: April 22, 2008 – October 22, 2012 (with Hogan Sheffer: 7/15/08-10/22/12) (with Scott Hamner: 8/11/08-10/22/12) (with Josh Griffith: 10/11/12-10/22/12)
- Co-Executive Producer (with Paul Rauch: October 3, 2008 – May 10, 2011)
- Executive Producer May 11, 2011 – October 22, 2012

== Awards ==
The Young and the Restless writing team won the WGA Award for Best Daytime Serial in February 2010 and again in 2013 for work airing under Bell's tenure.

In 2011, Bell, along with her writing team, won the Daytime Emmy Award for Outstanding Drama Series Writing Team. In December 2012, Bell was honored with the Women's Image Network Humanitarian Award for her contributions to arts and arts education.

In 2015, Bell was named to the Newport Harbor Hall of Fame.

== Personal life ==
Bell is married to Bill Bell, the elder son and oldest child Y&R creators William J. Bell and Lee Phillip Bell. They have two children.
