= Ryan McNeil =

Fictional character from the American CBS soap opera The Young and the Restless

- The Young and the Restless character
- Portrayed by: Scott Reeves
- Duration: 1991–2001
- First appearance: June 26, 1991
- Last appearance: December 5, 2001
- Created by: William J. Bell
- Introduced by: Edward J. Scott
In-universe information
- Occupation: Businessman
- Spouse: Victoria Newman (1992–1993); Nina Webster (1994–1998); Tricia Dennison (1998–2001)

Ryan McNeil is a fictional character from The Young and the Restless, an American soap opera on the CBS network. Created by William J. Bell, the character was portrayed by Scott Reeves, who made his first appearance on June 26, 1991, as a businessman who wanted to "work his way to the top of the corporation ladder". The character gained popularity upon his relationship with Victoria Newman (Heather Tom), which initially received criticism due to the characters' age gap. He was also involved with Nina Webster (Tricia Cast) and the insane Tricia Dennison (Sabryn Genet).

Reeves, who described Ryan as a "go-getter" who was "shrewd" and a "charmer", found his seduction storyline with Victoria hard to "play out", considering her age. In October 2001, the actor announced his exit from The Young and the Restless, stating that it was to pursue other projects. The producers kept quiet about the storyline surrounding his exit, although confirmed that he would depart "in a big way". Within the story, Ryan prepared to remarry Victoria but Tricia Dennison, his ex-wife, attempted to shoot her and Ryan took two bullets and died from the injury. Throughout his time on the soap opera, Reeves became popular with fans as one of the genre's leading men, garnering multiple awards and nominations.

== Casting ==
Reeves first appeared as Ryan in May 1991, on contract. In March 2000, it was announced Reeves had signed a three-year deal with Sony Pictures, which would have furthered his portrayal until 2003. However, by August 2001, reports began to surface that Reeves had been released from his contract and would be exiting in a "storyline-dictated" departure, during the November sweeps period. In October, Reeves officially announced his exit from the soap opera, stating that it was to pursue other projects. The producers kept quiet about his exit storyline, but stated that he would leave "in a big way". His character died on the episode dated November 27, 2001.

== Character development ==
"What his main goal is, is to get to the top, at anyone's expense. He'll do anything to anyone, for anyone, just so he can climb".

— Reeves on the character's incentives (1991)

Upon Ryan's introduction to the series, arch-villain David Kimble was on his way out, leaving the manipulative character of Jack Abbott (Peter Bergman) "mellowing". This is why Reeves was brought in, to fill the void, and portray a character which he best described as "cads". A businessman, Ryan wanted to work his way to the top of the corporation ladder. While Reeves is a family man, The Toronto Star characterized Ryan as "rake" and a "soap seducer". While he was still a newcomer on the series, Reeves stated he was having a "great time" playing the role. He described Ryan as a "go-getter" who was "very shrewd—and a real charmer". "He gets what he wants", the actor explained to the Daily News of Los Angeles.

Months into the character's duration on the series, he manipulatively seduced businessman Victor Newman's (Eric Braeden) teenage daughter Victoria (Heather Tom). Reeves found it challenging to play out this storyline. He stated, "You have to make up something, a situation in your mind, and play off that. I try to remember people I've known, or stories that I've heard about people who've been like [Ryan]". Eventually, Ryan and Victoria were married. Their marriage ended after Victoria refused to consummate it due to her fear of sex, resulting in Ryan beginning an affair with Nina Webster (Tricia Cast). The series' creator William J. Bell said that Victoria knew Nina still loved Ryan and suspected that the marriage would not last, and that "in Victoria's mind, the threat is still there". Of Victoria's refusal to consummate her marriage, yet desperateness to get her husband back, the Fort Worth Star-Telegram said: "She's divorced, rich and hates sex. And now she wants her husband back. As soap operas go, Victoria Newman's plight [...] is standard daytime fare. But Victoria has one characteristic that many of her counterparts don't – she is only 17".

== Storylines ==
While working in the mail room at Newman Enterprises, 19-year-old Ryan meets 15-year-old Victoria Newman (Heather Tom), the daughter of the company's founder and CEO, Victor Newman. The two fall in love and marry, to Victor's dismay; however, Victoria refuses to consummate their relationship and Ryan cheats on her with Nina Webster. Victoria divorces him, and he then moves in with Nina and her son, Phillip Chancellor IV (Thomas Dekker), and he later marries Nina out of obligation. He eventually develops genuine feelings for Nina; however, she has fallen in love with novelist Cole Howard (J. Eddie Peck). After Cole rejects Nina, she has a nervous breakdown causing Ryan to sleep with Tricia Dennison (Sabryn Genet). Nina then tries to commit suicide and shoots herself in a struggle with Ryan; he is arrested for the shooting. Nina suffers short-term amnesia, and although she regains her memory and exonerates Ryan, they divorce. Ryan then ends up marrying Tricia, much to the disapproval of her father Keith Dennison (David Allen Brooks). However, Tricia is very jealous of Ryan's relationship with Phillip, who accuses her of breaking apart his family. In desperation, Tricia stops taking her birth control pills and they conceive a child; Ryan is against the idea, though he warms up to it. When she eventually miscarries, Tricia sees it as her punishment for having deceived her husband.

Tricia then becomes obsessed with destroying her sister Megan Dennison's (Ashley Jones) relationship with Tony Viscardi (Nick Scotti). She runs Tony down in Megan's driveway, and is suspected of having done so intentionally. Eventually, all the Dennisons leave town, including Tricia, who leaves Ryan to move to London, England. Six months later, Tricia returns to Genoa City and asks Ryan to take her back; he refuses, as Victoria has become interested in him again. Tricia turns to Carter Mills, who is really rapist Matt Clark (Rick Hearst). He uses her, leading Tricia to attempt suicide, but Ryan is able to stop her. After Ryan and Victoria reunite, Victor has Tricia move in with him to keep her away from them. They decide to remarry, and on their wedding day Tricia arrives in a wedding dress identical to Victoria's, locks her in a closet and takes her place at the altar, where she holds Ryan at gunpoint to remarry her instead. Victor breaks Victoria free, who enters the chapel; Tricia shoots twice at her, but Ryan jumps in front to save her life. Eventually, Ryan dies from the gunshot wounds, leaving Victoria devastated and alone. Shortly after, Ryan appears to Victoria in a dream where they say their vows, and she awakes with a ring on her finger.

== Reception ==
A syndicated article that appeared in The Fort Oglethorpe Press described Ryan's attempts to seduce Victoria as "a path that's fraught with peril and which forces the good-natured actor to search hard for inspiration". Over his duration on The Young and the Restless, Reeves became popular with fans, and his performance was met with acclaim from his peers. In 1994, he garnered a Soap Opera Digest Award for Outstanding Younger Actor. In 1997 and 1998, he earned Daytime Emmy Award nominations for Outstanding Supporting Actor. The following year, he received a Soap Opera Digest Award nomination for Best Supporting Actor. Upon learning of the actor's decision to quit following ten years on the soap opera, the Herald Journal said it was "hard to believe" that one of "daytime's most popular young leading men are leaving the fold". Fans of Reeves hoped that the show's writers would play "the ghost card" for him to return to the series.
