= List of The Young and the Restless characters introduced in the 1990s =

The following is a list of notable characters from the CBS soap opera The Young and the Restless that do not have their own pages but significantly impacted storylines and debuted between January 1990 and December 1999.

== Lillie Belle Barber ==
Lillie Belle Barber
- The Young and the Restless character
- Portrayed by: Norma Donaldson (1990–94); Robin Braxton (1994)
- Duration: 1990–94
- First appearance: December 5, 1990
- Last appearance: 1994
- Created by: William J. Bell
- Introduced by: Edward J. Scott
In-universe information
- Family: Barber
- Sisters: Mamie Johnson
- Husband: Walter Barber (1957–)
- Daughters: Olivia Barber; Drucilla Winters
- Grandchildren: Lily Winters; Devon Hamilton (adoptive); Nathan Hastings, Jr.

Lillie Belle Barber first appeared in 1990 as the mother of Olivia and Drucilla Barber. The role was originated by Norma Donaldson, who portrayed the role for four years before being replaced by Robin Braxton briefly in 1994.

History
Lillie Belle and her husband Walter are the parents of Drucilla and Olivia Barber. Lillie Belle, in particular, tended to favor her older daughter, Olivia, because Drucilla was the product of Walter and Lillie Belle having unprotected sex. The favoritism of Olivia over Drucilla caused Dru to run away from home to Genoa City as a teenager. Years later, when Lillie Belle and Walter reunited with Drucilla during a visit to Genoa City, she discovered the truth about her conception. Olivia was furious over this revelation and berated her mother mercilessly for mistreating her sister for her entire life. Later, Lillie Belle returned to town after leaving Walter, and she decided to live with Olivia and her husband, Nathan Hastings. Lillie Belle caused various problems in their marriage, and she remained a problem for everyone due to her health situation. Dru tried to get Lillie Belle to move in with her, but Lillie Belle, once again, chose Olivia over Dru. Eventually, Walter arrived and took Lillie Belle back home.

In September 2023, Lily revealed Walter and Lillie Belle had been deceased for years.

== Walter Barber ==
Walter Barber
- The Young and the Restless character
- Portrayed by: Henry Sanders (1990–91); Bennett Guillory (1992–94)
- Duration: 1990–94
- First appearance: December 14, 1990
- Last appearance: 1994
- Created by: William J. Bell
- Introduced by: Edward J. Scott
In-universe information
- Family: Barber
- Brothers: Wesley Barber
- Wife: Lillie Belle Barber (1957–)
- Daughters: Olivia Barber; Drucilla Barber
- Grandsons: Nathan Hastings, Jr.; Devon Hamilton (adoptive)
- Granddaughters: Lily Winters
- Nephews: Justin Barber

Walter Barber first appeared in 1990 as the father of the late Drucilla Barber, and Olivia Barber. The role was originated by Henry Sanders, and then taken over by Bennett Guillory from 1992 to 1994.

History
Walter and his wife Lillie Belle were married in 1957. Lillie Belle, in particular, tended to favor her older daughter, Olivia, because Drucilla was the product of Walter and Lillie Belle having unprotected sex. The favoritism of Olivia over Drucilla caused Dru to run away from home to Genoa City as a teenager. Years later, when Lillie Belle and Walter reunited with Drucilla during a visit to Genoa City, she discovered the truth about her conception. Walter assured Drucilla that he always accepted her despite the fact that the pregnancy was unplanned. Olivia was furious over this revelation and berated her mother mercilessly for mistreating her sister for her entire life. Later, Lillie Belle returned to town after leaving Walter, and she decided to live with Olivia and her husband, Nathan Hastings. Lillie Belle caused various problems in their marriage, and she remained a problem for everyone due to her health situation. Dru tried to get Lillie Belle to move in with her, but Lillie Belle, once again, chose Olivia over Drucilla. Eventually, Walter arrived and took Lillie Belle back home.

In September 2023, Lily revealed Walter and Lillie Belle had been deceased for years.

== Molly Carter ==
Molly Carter
- The Young and the Restless character
- Portrayed by: Marilyn Alex
- Duration: 1991–95; 1997–98
- First appearance: March 7, 1991
- Last appearance: April 27, 1998
- Created by: William J. Bell
- Introduced by: Edward J. Scott
- Crossover appearances: The Bold and the Beautiful
In-universe information
- Daughters: Sheila Carter; Sarah Smythe
- Grandchildren: Mary Carter Warwick; Daisy Carter; Ryder Callahan; Diana Carter; John Finnegan

Molly Carter first appeared on March 7, 1991, on The Young and the Restless the mother of Sheila Carter, portrayed by Marilyn Alex. The character departed Y&R in 1993, and returned again briefly in 1995. From October 8 to November 20, 1992, the character appeared on its sister soap The Bold and the Beautiful. The character appeared again on B&B on January 6, 1993; May 4, 1993; January 11, 1994; January 14, 1994; April 7, 1994; and from January 23, 1997, to April 27, 1998.

History
Molly Carter is the mother of former nurse Sheila Carter, and Sarah Smythe. When Molly visited her daughter in 1991, she discovered that Sheila stole Lauren Fenmore's newborn son, Scotty, and was passing him off as her own. After Molly suffered a stroke that left her inarticulate, Sheila sent her back to her farmhouse in Michigan, but Molly partly regained her voice and was able to communicate the truth to Lauren. Furious, Sheila kidnapped both Lauren and Molly and held them hostage at the farmhouse. An accidental fire broke loose and everyone believed Sheila perished in the flames. Lauren and Molly were rescued by Paul Williams and his secretary, Lynne Bassett.

It was revealed that Sheila had escaped the farmhouse fire and started a new life in Los Angeles. She began to use Molly to win Lauren's favor in the hopes that Lauren would eventually forgive her for her crimes. Then, Sheila could marry the renowned fashion CEO, Eric Forrester. Her plan, however, did not work; Lauren and Sheila remained at odds for years. Molly returned to Los Angeles years later to attend Sheila's wedding to James Warwick.

== Florence Webster ==
Florence Webster
- The Young and the Restless character
- Portrayed by: Sharon Farrell
- Duration: 1991–97
- First appearance: April 16, 1991
- Last appearance: December 24, 1997
- Created by: William J. Bell
- Introduced by: Edward J. Scott
In-universe information
- Occupation: Prostitute
- Husband: "Jim Adams" (1991)
- Daughters: Nina Webster
- Grandsons: Ronan Malloy; Chance Chancellor

Florence "Flo" Webster is the mother of Nina Webster (Tricia Cast), portrayed by Sharon Farrell from 1991 to 1997. Florence was Farrell's first role on daytime television. Charlie Mason from Soaps She Knows referred to the character as "trashy" and called Farrell a "Scene Stealer".

History
Florence, also known as "Flo", came to Genoa City in 1991, living with her daughter Nina Webster for a few years. Flo worked as a part-time prostitute. She later was conned by a romance of her daughter, David Kimble (Michael Corbett) into marrying him, believing his name was "Jim Adams". Their marriage was declared invalid. In 1997, Flo left Genoa City and moved to Los Angeles.

== Hilary Lancaster ==
Hilary Lancaster
- The Young and the Restless character
- Portrayed by: Kelly Garrison
- Duration: 1991–93
- First appearance: April 24, 1991
- Last appearance: May 5, 1993
- Created by: William J. Bell
- Introduced by: Edward J. Scott
In-universe information
- Occupation: Trustee
- Husband: Michael Baldwin (1992-1993)

Hilary Lancaster was portrayed by Kelly Garrison from April 24, 1991 (episode 4595) to May 5, 1993 (episode 5106).

== Blade Bladeson ==
Blade Bladeson
- The Young and the Restless character
- Portrayed by: Michael Tylo
- Duration: 1992–95
- First appearance: January 14, 1992
- Last appearance: 1995
- Created by: William J. Bell
- Introduced by: Edward J. Scott
In-universe information
- Siblings: Rick Bladeson
- Wife: Ashley Abbott (1994–95)

Alexander "Blade" Bladeson first appeared in 1992. He is the twin brother of Rick Bladeson. Both Bladeson twins were portrayed by actor Michael Tylo until 1995.

History
Blade was introduced as a Jabot Cosmetics photographer in 1992. After engaging in an affair with Jill Abbott, Blade began dating Ashley Abbott but Blade would not open up to her about his past beyond telling her that Blade was a stage name, he was escaping his past and he had a brother. They fell in love and married. They took up residence at the Abbott mansion awaiting the building of their new home. In 1994, Blade helps Malcolm Winters become Genoa City's most prominent photographer. Blade's former lover Mari Jo Mason comes to town telling him she read about his upcoming marriage to Ashley Abbott. Mari Jo said she wanted to see him, but Blade refused. Later, Blade couldn't identify the "Mari-Lyn" who sent him a painting as a wedding gift. As head of Jabot's art department, Mari Jo was working with Ashley. Afterward, Blade told Marilyn not to call him again. They both agreed to keep their shared past a secret. Blade never forgave Mari Jo for sleeping with his twin brother, Rick. Mari Jo knew that Blade heard Rick's cries for help while he supposedly drowned. She used that knowledge to her advantage.

In November 1994, Rick turned up alive in Genoa City and was angry with his brother for leaving him to die. Rick went on to date Mari Jo again. Ashley saw them together, and she thought Blade was having an affair. Blade was unable to explain things to Ashley without revealing the truth. Mari Jo went on to fall in love with Ashley's brother, Jack Abbott, while Ashley and Blade try to work on their marriage. Rick kidnapped Blade and replaced him as Ashley's husband. Ashley was overjoyed in the sudden change "Blade" goes through, but Blade managed to escape and convinced Rick to leave town. They switch places a few more times. One night Rick, again impersonating Blade, was with Ashley in her and Blade's bedroom when Blade called. Blade heard Ashley talking in the background and Rick taunting Blade, threatening to have sex with Ashley and impregnate her. Blade told Rick he was coming over to stop him and quickly drove home. Rick left the house to stop Blade, but Blade was killed in a tragic car wreck when his car was hit by a train. Rick left, leaving Ashley thinking Blade had died after he left the house. When Rick returned to attend Blade's funeral, he revealed the entire truth to Ashley and she decided to leave Genoa City to privately deal with the pain of her husband's death. Jill and Mari Jo soon learn of Rick's sick game and convinced Rick to leave town.

== Steve Connelly ==
Steve Connelly
- The Young and the Restless character
- Portrayed by: Greg Wrangler
- Duration: 1992–96; 1999; 2001; 2009
- First appearance: April 23, 1992
- Last appearance: October 9, 2009
- Created by: William J. Bell
- Introduced by: Edward J. Scott
In-universe information
- Occupation: Book publisher
- Wife: Traci Abbott Connelly (1993–2014)
- Stepdaughters: Colleen Carlton

Steve Connelly first appeared in April 1992, and would later be known as the husband of Traci Abbott. The role was originated by Greg Wrangler until August 1992, and again from 1993 to 1996. The character returned from September 21 to December 17, 2001, and again from September 21 to October 9, 2009.

Steve Connelly was the publisher of Traci's book. He moved to Genoa City to help Traci out with writing. The two bonded and soon started a relationship, which caused her ex-husband, Brad Carlton, to become jealous. Traci eventually decided to leave town and go to New York with Steve and her daughter with Brad, Colleen. Steve and Traci got married off-screen. In 2001, Traci revealed that Steve was cheating on her, and she moved back to Genoa City. Colleen was hurt by the fighting between Traci and Steve, while Ashley Abbott, who feared that Traci's return might threaten her current marriage to Brad, encouraged Traci to try and work on her marriage with Steve. Steve and Traci eventually reconciled and returned to New York with Colleen. Steve returned to Genoa City in 2009 to support Traci after Colleen tragically died.

== Nate Hastings ==
Nate Hastings
- The Young and the Restless character
- Portrayed by: Various child actors (1992–94); Christopher Pope (1995); Malcolm Hunter (1995–1996); Bryant Jones (1996–2002); Walter Fauntleroy (2011); Brooks Darnell (2018–2019); Sean Dominic (2019–present)
- Duration: 1992–2002; 2011; 2018–present
- First appearance: September 22, 1992
- Created by: William J. Bell
- Introduced by: Edward J. Scott (1992); Maria Arena Bell and Paul Rauch (2011); Mal Young (2018)
In-universe information
- Other names: Nathan Hastings, Jr.
- Occupation: Physician
- Family: Winters
- Father: Nathan Hastings, Sr.
- Mother: Olivia Barber
- Adoptive father: Malcolm Winters
- Half-brothers: Damien Kane
- Half-sisters: Lily Winters (adoptive)
- Grandparents: Walter Barber; Lillie Belle Barber; Ellis Winters (adoptive)
- Aunts and uncles: Drucilla Barber; Neil Winters (adoptive)
- Nephews: Charlie Ashby
- Nieces: Mattie Ashby
- First cousins: Lily Winters; Devon Hamilton (adoptive); Moses Winters

Nate Hastings first appeared on September 22, 1992, when he was born onscreen as the son of Olivia Barber and Nathan Hastings, Sr. The character was portrayed by a series of child actors (see below) between 1992 and 2002. The character briefly returned in February 2011 after a 9-year absence, portrayed by Walter Fauntleroy.

Casting
The role was originated by Shantel and Shenice Buford from 1992 to 1995, during which Ashaneese and Nasharin Holderness served as back-up in 1993. Christopher Pope then took over in 1995, before being replaced by Malcolm Hunter that same year. Bryant Jones then portrayed the role from 1996 to 2002 on contract. In 2011, the role was briefly portrayed by Walter Fauntleroy. In June 2018, Entertainment Weekly reported that former Shadowhunters actor Brooks Darnell has been cast as Nate, making his debut on July 3, 2018. In March 2019, with the installation of new head writer Josh Griffith, it was announced that actor Sean Dominic had been chosen as a recast for the role; debuting on April 10, 2019.

History
Nate is the son of Olivia Barber Winters and her first husband, the late Nathan Hastings, Sr. He was delivered early due to his mother's ovarian cancer scare. Later, when Olivia found out about her husband's affair with Keesha Monroe, a woman with AIDS, Nathan kidnapped Nate and disappeared. After several weeks on the run, Nathan decided to return Nate to Olivia. When Nate wandered away from his father on a crowded street, Nathan rushed to find his son and was fatally struck by a car.

After Nathan's death, Olivia became close to Malcolm Winters, who also had a soft spot for Nate. Olivia enrolled Nate at the Walnut Grove Academy. Malcolm soon married Olivia and raised the possibility of adopting Nate, who considered Malcolm to be his father, even though he was old enough to remember his biological father. Olivia spent many hours at the hospital as a doctor, and Nate was often neglected; Malcolm and Nate's nanny, Julia, raised him more than his own mother. Olivia and Malcolm eventually divorced, yet Malcolm remained a staple in Nate's life. Olivia contracted aplastic anemia and changed her will so Malcolm's brother, Neil Winters, would raise Nate if she were to pass away. Once Olivia became healthy again, she took away all of Malcolm's paternal rights to Nate; Malcolm later sued Olivia for joint custody and won. Malcolm remained present in Nate's life until he was presumed dead after disappearing from a photoshoot in Africa. Neil became an alcoholic, and Olivia refused to let him see Nate. Therefore, Nate no longer had a father figure in his life. Brad Carlton, Olivia's friend Ashley Abbott's husband, tried to step in as a father figure to Nate. Still, Nate missed Malcolm, and he decided to go away to boarding school. Malcolm came back to Genoa City to see Nate, but he didn't realize that Nate was away at school. Nate never returned to Genoa City. In 2008, Olivia mentioned that Nate was attending Johns Hopkins School of Medicine in Baltimore, Maryland.

After a nine-year hiatus, the character returned on February 8, 2011, as the Boston physician treating former FBI agent, Ronan Malloy and his liver ailment. After the situation with Ronan, Nate met up with his family: cousins Lily Winters and Devon Hamilton, as well as Neil and Malcolm; he also met Lily's twins, Charlie Ashby and Matilda Ashby. Nate stayed with Lily for a short time while she mourned the loss of her husband, Cane Ashby. Then, he decided to live with Lily in her spare bedroom. He left town again, but returned in 2018 to care for Nikki Newman as her personal physician. He is currently a surgeon at Memorial Hospital.

== Mari Jo Mason ==
Mari Jo Mason
- The Young and the Restless character
- Portrayed by: Diana Barton (1994–96)
- Duration: 1994–96
- First appearance: February 1994
- Last appearance: July 1996
- Created by: William J. Bell
- Introduced by: Edward J. Scott
In-universe information
- Other names: Marilyn

Marilyn JoAnne "Mari Jo" Mason first appeared in February played by Diana Barton, who originated and remained in the role until 1996. Although Pamela Bach was initially cast as Mari Jo, she never aired as the character, being recast beforehand.

History
In 1994, Mari Jo Mason was the head of the Jabot Cosmetics art department. She contacted her former lover, Blade Bladeson (Michael Tylo). She read about his upcoming marriage to Ashley Abbott (Brenda Epperson, then Shari Shattuck), and she wanted to see him, but Blade refused. Mari Jo was still in love with Blade, but he could not forgive her for sleeping with his twin brother, Rick Bladeson (also Michael Tylo). She agreed to keep their past hidden until she began blackmailing Blade. She witnessed the "fatal" drowning of Rick, while Blade ignored his brother's cries for help.

Later, Rick shocked everyone by returning to Genoa City alive. He was determined to get revenge on his brother for leaving him to die. Rick and Mari Jo had a short-lived romance, and Ashley, not knowing that Blade was a twin, thought that Rick was Blade. She believed that Blade was having an affair with Mari Jo. Upon confrontation, Blade had no choice but to tell Ashley about his twin brother. Mari Jo soon struck up a romance with Jack Abbott (Peter Bergman), and the two were engaged to be married. Jack broke off their engagement when he was reunited with his former lover, Luan Volien (Elizabeth Sung). Mari Jo tried to break Jack and Luan up by following them to St. Thomas on a vacation, where Ashley and Blade were also staying in an attempt to fix their marriage. After several switches between the twins, things took a turn for the worse, and Blade was fatally struck by a car in 1995.

Mari Jo decided to support Jack and Luan's relationship when Luan confided in Mari Jo that she was dying. She decided to try a with romance Jack's son with Luan, Keemo Volien Abbott (Philip Moon), but she still loved Jack. Keemo ended their relationship after Mari Jo hired a hooker to impersonate her in bed. After Luan's death, Mari Jo supported Jack after his loss, and they fell in love again. Meanwhile, Keemo (still scorned by Mari Jo's rejection) sent a scathing fax of Mari Jo's misdeeds to Victor Newman (Eric Braeden). She became fearful that Victor would find the fax that listed all of her misdeeds so she attempted to kill him by shooting him. After recovering, Victor decided to set Mari Jo up. He made it look like Christine Blair (Lauralee Bell) had a copy of the fax. Mari Jo drugged Christine, and she took her hostage. Along with Paul Williams (Doug Davidson), Victor found Mari Jo and Christine after they planted a tracking device on her. Mari Jo was about to kill Christine until she realized that the gun that Victor planted was full of blanks. Mari Jo was charged with the attempted murder of Victor and the kidnapping of Christine, and she was committed to a psychiatric facility in 1996. She had a final moment with Jack where she tried to explain herself and ask forgiveness.

== Doris Collins ==
Doris Collins
- The Young and the Restless character
- Portrayed by: Victoria Ann Lewis (1994); Karen Hensel (1994–2012)
- Duration: 1994–2003; 2005; 2008–09; 2011–12
- First appearance: May 1994
- Last appearance: September 28, 2012
- Created by: William J. Bell
- Introduced by: Edward J. Scott
In-universe information
- Daughters: Sharon Newman
- Grandchildren: Cassie Newman; Mariah Copeland; Noah Newman; Faith Newman

Doris Collins first appeared in May 1994 as the mother of Sharon Newman. Portrayed by Victoria Ann Lewis, she was replaced the same year by Karen Hensel until 2003, returning in 2005, 2008, 2009, 2011, and 2012.

History
Before debuting on the series, Doris became a paraplegic after going out to search for Sharon in a snowstorm and getting in a car accident. Doris was once again shaken up when her daughter Sharon Newman became pregnant at sixteen years old and suggested adoption. Sharon agreed, but years later, both Doris and Sharon were overjoyed when they were reunited with Cassie. Doris has been there for Sharon whenever she needs advice and continues to visit periodically. Doris visited again when Sharon's ex-husband Nicholas Newman invited her back to Genoa City to help him and Sharon's children, Noah and Faith, spread Sharon's "ashes" while believing her dead. Doris returned to Genoa City again the following year to ask Sharon to return to Madison with her after everyone in Genoa City despised Sharon after what she did when her husband, Victor Newman, went missing and then supposedly died.

== Luan Volien Abbott ==
Luan Volien Abbott
- The Young and the Restless character
- Portrayed by: Elizabeth Sung
- Duration: 1994–96
- First appearance: June 1994
- Last appearance: April 1996
- Created by: William J. Bell
- Introduced by: Edward J. Scott
In-universe information
- Other names: Mai Yun
- Occupation: Owner and hostess of the Saigon Shack restaurant
- Family: Abbott
- Husband: Doan Volien (pre–1994); Jack Abbott (1995–96)
- Sons: Keemo Volien Abbott
- Daughters: Mai Volien
- Grandchildren: Allie Nguyen

Luan Volien Abbott first appeared in June 1994. She would later be known for her relationship and marriage to Jack Abbott. Luan is also the late mother of Keemo Volien Abbott and Mai Volien. The role was portrayed by actress Elizabeth Sung until the character's onscreen death in April 1996.

History
While serving in Vietnam, Jack fell in love with Luan, but they were separated at the conclusion of the war. Twenty years later in 1994, Luan appeared in Genoa City, at her Vietnamese restaurant that she ran with her daughter, Mai. She and Jack soon reunited. Luan informed Jack that after the war, she gave birth to their son, Keemo. When Luan was shot at her restaurant by burglars, Keemo was found and brought to Genoa City by Christine Blair and Paul Williams. Keemo resented his parents, Luan and Jack, because they abandoned him, but he later made amends with Luan, who recovered from her injuries.

After Luan recovered, she and Jack rekindled their romance and married. Luan's daughter, Mai, lives with them and attends the local high school. Shortly after getting married, Luan was diagnosed with a terminal illness and kept it hidden from Jack at first, until later when Jack learned the truth. Luan later died from the unnamed terminal illness. Upon his mother's death, Keemo returned to Vietnam with Mai in tow.

== Keemo Volien Abbott ==
Keemo Volien Abbott
- The Young and the Restless character
- Portrayed by: Philip Moon
- Duration: 1994–96
- First appearance: July 1994
- Last appearance: April 1996
- Created by: William J. Bell
- Introduced by: Edward J. Scott
In-universe information
- Other names: Hao Nguyen II
- Father: Jack Abbott
- Mother: Luan Volien
- Stepmother: Nikki Newman (1994, 2012); Phyllis Summers (2001–04, 2015–16); Sharon Newman (2007–09)
- Half-brothers: John Abbott III; Kyle Abbott
- Half-sisters: Mai Volien
- Daughters: Allie Nguyen
- Grandfathers: John Abbott
- Grandmothers: Dina Mergeron
- Uncles: Billy Abbott; Eric Vanderway
- Aunts: Ashley Abbott; Traci Abbott
- Nephews: Harrison Locke
- First cousins: Colleen Carlton; Abby Newman; Delia Abbott; Johnny Abbott; Katie Newman; Theo Vanderway

Keemo Volien Abbott first appeared in July 1994 as the son of Jack Abbott and Luan Volien. The role was portrayed by actor Philip Moon until April 1996.

History
In July 1994, he was found living in the jungles of Vietnam by Christine Blair and Paul Williams when they went to Vietnam to locate him to bring him to his mother Luan Volien, who had been shot by a robber at her restaurant in Genoa City.

Upon Keemo's arrival in Genoa City, Keemo resented his parents for abandoning him, but he eventually formed a relationship with them and his sister, Mai. Keemo developed feelings for Christine, who let him down easy by telling him she wanted to be friends. Keemo had an aptitude for science and was put to work in the labs at Jabot. Keemo later became romantically involved with Mari Jo Mason, but he got tired of Mari Jo's mind-games and ended the relationship after she paid a prostitute to sleep with him. In April 1996, when Luan dies from a terminal illness, Keemo leaves Genoa City, along with his sister Mai.

Keemo had barely been mentioned and not seen for years. In 2022, Jack got texts from an address owned by Keemo's late grandfather Hao Nguyen. Jack then revealed to Phyllis and Traci that, although he and Keemo had reconciled before he left town, Keemo had later denounced Jack altogether for keeping his mother's illness a secret from him, prompting him to change his name to his grandfather's name Hao Nguyen. While doing some research, Jack and Phyllis found an obituary that confirmed Keemo had died a couple of weeks prior of a heart attack. Jack and Phyllis arrived in Los Angeles and learns that Keemo has a daughter named Allie that Jack has never met and Keemo was divorced a few years ago.

== Rick Bladeson ==
Rick Bladeson
- The Young and the Restless character
- Portrayed by: Michael Tylo
- Duration: 1994–95
- First appearance: November 1994
- Last appearance: 1995
- Created by: William J. Bell
- Introduced by: Edward J. Scott
In-universe information
- Siblings: Blade Bladeson

Richard "Rick" Bladeson first appeared in November 1994 as the twin brother of the late Blade Bladeson. Both Bladeson brothers were portrayed by Michael Tylo. Tylo portrayed Rick through 1995.

History
Rick was believed to have drowned, and his brother, Blade Bladeson, refused to help him. But in November 1994, Rick turned up alive in Genoa City and was angry with his brother for leaving him to die. Rick went on to date Mari Jo Mason, Blade's ex-girlfriend who Rick had had a previous romance with. Blade's wife Ashley Abbott, unaware that Rick was Blade's identical twin brother, saw them together and thought Blade was having an affair. Blade was unable to explain things to Ashley without revealing the truth. Rick kidnapped Blade and replaced him as Ashley's husband. Ashley was overjoyed in the sudden change "Blade" went through, but Blade managed to escape and convinced Rick to leave town. Rick told Blade that he owed Rick for saving his marriage to Ashley and giving Blade a second chance with Ashley. They switched places a few more times. One night Rick, again impersonating Blade, was with Ashley in her and Blade's bedroom when Blade called. Blade heard Ashley talking in the background and Rick taunting Blade, threatening to have sex with Ashley and impregnate her. Blade told Rick he was coming over to stop him and quickly drove home. Rick left the house to stop Blade, but Blade was killed in a tragic car wreck when his car was hit by a train. Rick left, leaving Ashley thinking Blade had died after he left the house. When Rick returned to attend Blade's funeral, he revealed the entire truth to Ashley. Mari Jo and Jill soon learned of Rick's sick game and confronted him and threatened to inform the police unless he left town. Rick left town and soon Ashley also left Genoa City to privately deal with the pain of her husband's death.

== Norman Peterson ==
Norman Peterson was portrayed by Mark Haining in 1994 as a con artist who married Esther Valentine and later murdered Rex Sterling.

History
Norman Peterson was a con artist that put a personal ad in the newspaper which was found by Esther Valentine, who could not resist but to answer. To impress the gentleman, Esther posed as the owner of the Chancellor mansion, while the real owner Katherine Chancellor and Rex Sterling agreed to go along with her plan and dress as servants. In a rather short time, Norman convinced Esther to ask Kay to put her in her will. Kay and Rex were very suspicious of Norman when he proposed marriage to Esther, so they decided to have a fake wedding. Norman knew his plans were foiled and he wasn't ready to wait years until he could get his hands on the Chancellor fortune, so he tried to break into the safe. Rex caught him, so Norman killed him and was arrested for his murder later.

== Amy Wilson ==
Amy Wilson
- The Young and the Restless character
- Portrayed by: Robin Scott (1994); Julianne Morris (1994–96, 2014)
- Duration: 1994–96; 2014
- First appearance: 1994
- Last appearance: November 25, 2014
- Created by: William J. Bell
- Introduced by: Edward J. Scott

Amy Wilson first appeared in 1994 as a high school girlfriend of Nicholas Newman, and then a victim of rapist Matt Clark. She was originally portrayed by Robin Scott, before being replaced by Julianne Morris who remained in the role until 1996.

History
When Nicholas Newman returned to Genoa City in 1994 as a 16-year-old, he started dating Amy Wilson, a respected teenager that was well liked by Nick's parents. Amy was best friends with Sharon Collins, with whom Nick fell in love, but Nick decided to stay with Amy because Sharon was dating Matt Clark at the time. Amy was put aside when Nick decided to fight for Sharon. Much later, Nick's father Victor found Amy in bad mental state, recovering from some sort of trauma that happened on the night Matt Clark was shot. Amy realized during that time that she had shot Matt after he raped her. Afterward, she left town to seek mental help. In November 2014, more than 18 years after she departed, she appeared in a dream of Nicholas Newman, in which he sees all the women he had loved.

== Frank Barritt ==
Frank Barritt
- The Young and the Restless character
- Portrayed by: Phil Dozois
- Duration: 1995; 1997; 2003–04
- First appearance: 1995
- Last appearance: May 2004
In-universe information
- Children: Cassie Newman; Mariah Copeland
- Granddaughters: Aria Porter-Copeland (adoptive)

Frank Barritt first appeared in 1995 as the biological father of the late Cassie Newman and her previously unknown twin sister Mariah Copeland. He was a high school boyfriend of Sharon Newman, portrayed by Phil Dozois. He returned in 1997 and again in 2003 until the character's onscreen death in 2004.

Character background
During Sharon Collins' early years of high school in Madison, Wisconsin, she ran off in rebellion to join her best friend, Grace Turner, and boyfriend, Frank. A dangerous snow storm developed. Sharon's mother, Doris Collins, tried to look for Sharon and was paralyzed in car accident. When Sharon told Frank that she was pregnant after he had pressured her to have sex, he wanted nothing to do with her or his child. Sharon had the baby anyway. Sharon's daughter, Cassie, was given up for adoption at birth as Sharon was only 17 years old at the time of the birth.

Frank returned in 2003; he ran into Sharon and Cassie suddenly at Fenmore's Boutiques. Cassie wanted to know who he was, but her parents, now Sharon and her husband Nick Newman, wouldn't tell her. While on a trip in Denver, Sharon had a one-night stand with a man named Cameron Kirsten who tried to see her again in Genoa City. When Sharon tried to leave, Cameron tried to rape her. She smashed a champagne bottle over his head and thought she killed him. She asked Larry Warton to hide the body, which he did in the sewer. When Sharon started being haunted by the "ghost" Cameron, she went to see the body in the sewer to make sure Cameron was dead. Much to everyone's shock, the body turned out to be that of Frank who had stopped trying to see Cassie around New Year's Eve. Sharon became the number one suspect in his murder. Frank's body was found after it washed out of the sewer. Cameron had set Sharon up for Frank's murder, but she was later exonerated.

== Brian Hamilton ==
Brian Hamilton
- The Young and the Restless character
- Portrayed by: Steven Culp (1995); William A. Wallace (1997, 2002)
- Duration: 1995; 1997; 2002
- First appearance: 1995
- Last appearance: December 11, 2002
- Created by: William J. Bell
- Introduced by: Edward J. Scott
In-universe information
- Sons: Daniel Romalotti Jr.
- Granddaughters: Lucy Romalotti

Brian Hamilton first appeared in 1995 as the biological father of Daniel Romalotti and former lover of Phyllis Summers. The role was originated by Steven Culp, who portrayed the role in 1995. William A. Wallace portrayed the role briefly in 1997 and again for one episode on December 11, 2002.

History
In 1995, Danny Romalotti was devastated to discover that his son with Phyllis Summers, Daniel, was really the child of a man from Phyllis' past named Brian Hamilton. She had set Danny up all along. However, because Danny was the legal father on the birth certificate and had always acted as such, he still had rights. A vicious divorce and custody battle ensued, with Christine Blair as Danny's lawyer, and the recently paroled Michael Baldwin assisting Phyllis' legal counsel. Brian arrived in Genoa City to meet his son.

Phyllis and Michael began a wild affair. With the help of Brian, all of Phyllis's lies and manipulations were brought out in court, including the fact that Danny had been drugged that first time and never even made love with Phyllis as she had claimed. The court found her to be unstable and an unfit mother. Danny won custody of Daniel, whom he still considered his son, although Phyllis was allowed visitation. Brian left town soon after the custody agreement was finalized.

== George Summers ==
George Summers
- The Young and the Restless character
- Portrayed by: Duke Stroud (1995, 2002); Ken Howard (2012)
- Duration: 1995; 2002; 2012
- First appearance: February 14, 1995
- Last appearance: February 27, 2012
- Created by: William J. Bell
- Introduced by: Edward J. Scott (1995); Maria Arena Bell (2012)
In-universe information
- Father: George Summers Sr.
- Mother: Harriet Summers
- Wife: Lydia Callahan
- Daughters: Phyllis Summers; Avery Bailey Clark
- Grandsons: Daniel Romalotti
- Granddaughters: Summer Newman

George Summers was first seen in 1995 as the father of Phyllis Summers and Avery Bailey Clark. The character reappeared in 2002 in a vision that Phyllis had about her enemies whilst in prison. On January 18, 2012, it was announced that Ken Howard was cast in the role. He began taping on January 19, and aired from February 23 to 27 for three episodes. Duke Stroud portrayed the role briefly in 1995. Howard is the president of the Screen Actors Guild.

== Lydia Callahan ==
Lydia Callahan
- The Young and the Restless character
- Portrayed by: Abby Dalton (1995); Terie Lynn Davis (1996); Rosemary Murphy (1998)
- Duration: 1995–96; 1998
- First appearance: 1995
- Last appearance: 1998
- Created by: William J. Bell
- Introduced by: Edward J. Scott
In-universe information
- Husband: George Summers (196?–2012)
- Daughters: Phyllis Summers; Avery Bailey Clark
- Grandsons: Daniel Romalotti
- Granddaughters: Summer Newman
- Other relatives: Lucy Romalotti

Lydia Callahan first appeared in 1995 as the mother of Phyllis Summers. She was portrayed by Abby Dalton in 1995, Terie Lynn Davis in 1996, and Rosemary Murphy in 1998.

Character history
Lydia is the mother of Phyllis Summers and Avery Bailey Clark, introduced in 1995. She made occasional visits to Genoa City throughout the 1990s. In 2012, Phyllis revealed that her family turned against her when she exposed her father for robbing potential investors.

== Sasha Green ==
Sasha Green
- The Young and the Restless character
- Portrayed by: Tina Arning
- Duration: 1995–97; 2002
- First appearance: March 1995
- Last appearance: December 11, 2002
- Created by: William J. Bell
- Introduced by: Edward J. Scott
In-universe information
- Occupation: Lab geneticist

Sasha Green first appeared in March 1995 as a former co-worker of Phyllis. The role was portrayed by Tina Arning until July 1996, and again from January 1997 to May 27, 1997, when the character died in an apartment fire. However, she returned in a dream had by Phyllis on December 11, 2002.

History
Sasha came to town when her former co-worker, Phyllis Romalotti, contacted her for her to switch her son's, Daniel, paternity tests as her then-husband, Danny Romalotti, wanted one, feeling that Phyllis was not being honest about it. Christine Blair was also investigating Daniel's paternity for Danny. Sasha did what Phyllis wanted, and Phyllis outsmarted Christine. Phyllis then paid a former love of hers, Peter Garrett, to romance Sasha. The two began dating and moved to New York City together.

In 1997, after Phyllis and Danny got married again and were happy together while raising their son, Sasha re-entered their lives. She had been dumped by Peter, and she was in need of some cash. She blackmailed Phyllis into giving her money to keep quiet about the real paternity of Phyllis' son. After Phyllis initially refused, Sasha went to Christine with the same offer, but Phyllis was able to get a loan from Dr. Timothy Reid to pay off Sasha. Sasha made sure that she had copies of all of the documents that showed everything that Phyllis had done to Danny, but Phyllis managed to get rid of them. She confronted Sasha for the last time about possibly tricking her when Sasha died unexpectedly in her hotel room. Sasha was seen clutching a tabloid headline before her death, indicating that she may have sold her story to a tabloid. Phyllis feared that she might have killed Sasha, but the judge proclaimed that Sasha's death was accidental, as Sasha was a known careless smoker and heavy drinker. The truth about Sasha's death remains unrevealed. In 2012, Ricky Williams was going to start digging into it before his death.

== Keesha Monroe ==
Keesha Monroe
- The Young and the Restless character
- Portrayed by: Wanda Acuna (1995); Jennifer Gatti (1995–96)
- Duration: 1995–96
- First appearance: July 1995
- Last appearance: May 1996
- Created by: William J. Bell
- Introduced by: Edward J. Scott
In-universe information
- Husband: Malcolm Winters (1996)

Keesha Monroe first appeared in July 1995, portrayed by Wanda Acuna. Jennifer Gatti took over the role shortly after, and remained in the role through May 1996. Keesha is known as the late wife of Malcolm Winters.

History
In 1995, Nathan Hastings' wife Olivia had begun suspecting that Nathan was having an affair, which he was. Keesha, whose voice was only heard, later called Nathan without leaving her name. Nathan later confessed to Paul that he had been having an affair, but asked Paul to keep quiet. Keesha was first seen at Gina's Place, where Malcolm Winters stumbled upon her, and the two slowly started dating. After a few months of happiness, Malcolm found out that Keesha had an affair with Nathan. Nathan and Keesha's affair was over, but Keesha's troubles did not end there. After another altercation with an upset Malcolm as Keesha pleaded with him to forgive her, Keesha phoned her former boyfriend, Stan, after she realized how much he had meant to her. Keesha was puzzled when the number Stan gave her was for a hospital and was shocked when Stan's brother, Dave, said Stan had just died of AIDS. Later, she retrieved an old letter from Stan, who had written that he had HIV. Olivia was Keesha's physician when Keesha went and had herself checked and learned she had HIV. Fearing that she could've exposed Nathan to the virus, Keesha confessed her affair with Nathan to a furious Olivia.

Malcolm dropped his hostility and forgave Keesha for her affair with Nathan after he learned about her ailing health. Keesha's health took a turn as the virus worsened. On Keesha's dying breath to give her a few final moments of happiness, Malcolm arranged a wedding ceremony. Keesha lost her battle with AIDS as she died in Malcolm's arms moments after reciting their vows.

== Peter Garrett ==
Peter Garrett
- The Young and the Restless character
- Portrayed by: Justin Gorance
- Duration: 1995–98
- First appearance: November 1995
- Last appearance: January 1998
- Created by: William J. Bell
- Introduced by: Edward J. Scott

Peter Garrett first appeared in November 1995 as an ex-boyfriend of Phyllis Summers, whom she dated during her first separation from Danny Romalotti. The role was portrayed by Justin Gorence until July 1996, and again from 1997 to January 1998.

History
Peter was a man whom Phyllis Summers began dating during her separation from her ex-husband, Danny Romalotti. Phyllis dated Peter, who was also a patient of Phyllis' therapist, in hopes of making Danny jealous. Danny was jealous mostly because of Peter's connection with Phyllis and Danny's son, Daniel, Phyllis' plan backfired because it turned out that Danny was happy that Phyllis and Peter were together. Later, Phyllis ended things with Peter and fixed him up with her friend and former co-worker, Sasha Green, and the two moved to New York.

== Larry Warton ==
Larry Warton
- The Young and the Restless character
- Portrayed by: David "Shark" Fralick
- Duration: 1995–96; 1999–2005; since 2026
- First appearance: December 5, 1995
- Created by: William J. Bell
- Introduced by: Edward J. Scott (1995, 1999); Sally McDonald (2026)

Larry Warton first appeared in December 1995, portrayed by David "Shark" Fralick. His first run ended after a month in January 1996, though Fralick later returned on both contract and recurring status from December 29, 1999, to June 9, 2005.

History
Larry became the cellmate of Nick Newman when Nick was wrongly convicted for shooting Matt Clark and ended up in prison. Larry constantly tormented and intimidated Nick. One day, a fight erupted between the two, which would have ended in Nick's death if his father Victor Newman had not intervened. Victor then proceeded to beat Larry to a pulp. Larry was released on probation, and he was recruited by a vengeful Matt, under the alias Carter Mills, to bring the Newman family down. While plotting to frame Nick for manufacturing and selling ecstasy, Larry developed a soft spot for his young daughter, Cassie Newman, who eventually persuaded him to testify for Nick rather than against him.

Larry gradually began to reform after Nick's mother, Nikki Newman, gave him a job as a janitor at Jabot Cosmetics. He also rescued young lovers Billy Abbott and Mackenzie Browning from Mackenzie's stepfather, Ralph Hunnicutt, and ended up sleeping with Mackenzie's mother, Amanda Browning. Larry then began an affair with Billy's mother, Jill Abbott, who kept their affair a secret for fear that it would damage her reputation that she was dating a man so "beneath" her. Katherine Chancellor caught Larry sneaking out of Jill's room one night, and she confronted Jill about the affair. Jill viciously denied it, insulting Larry in the process. Larry retaliated by emptying a box of Jill's sex toys over the table at a Jabot board meeting. Larry then helped Nick's wife Sharon Newman cover up the fact that she had accidentally killed Cameron Kirsten. It was later revealed that Cameron was actually alive. Larry was last seen in 2005, when he returned to town to take Sharon for a ride on his motorcycle to cheer her up after Cassie's tragic death.

== Tim Reid ==
Tim Reid
- The Young and the Restless character
- Portrayed by: Aaron Lustig
- Duration: 1996–97; 2001–02; 2012
- First appearance: March 1996
- Last appearance: August 20, 2012
- Created by: William J. Bell
- Introduced by: Edward J. Scott (1996); Bradley Bell (2001)
- Crossover appearances: The Bold and the Beautiful
In-universe information
- Occupation: Family counselor psychologist security guard

Dr. Timothy "Tim" Reid first appeared in March 1996 on The Young and the Restless as a therapist of Phyllis Summers, who would later blackmail her. The role was portrayed by Aaron Lustig on that soap until November 29, 1997. In 2001, it was announced that Lustig would reprise the role on The Bold and the Beautiful, airing from February 20 to May 11, 2001. He briefly returned to The Young and the Restless in December 2002, during a dream that Phyllis had whilst in prison. In April 2012, it was announced that the character would return to The Young and the Restless for a brief guest period, his first appearance in 15 years. He aired from May 30 to June 8, with further appearances from July 27 to the character's death onscreen on August 20, 2012.

History
The Young and the Restless
Timothy, whom Phyllis called Tim, was the psychiatrist of Phyllis Romalotti. Phyllis told him her most deep secrets, from disappointments in her childhood to her current life problems. Tim slept with Phyllis after she seduced him, and she used the videotape of their lovemaking to blackmail him to testify on her behalf in court during the trial to end her marriage to Danny Romalotti. Tim later recanted his testimony, which resulted in the confiscation of his psychiatrist's license. After her marriage to Danny was over, Phyllis used Tim to make Danny jealous, even though Danny was never aware who Phyllis was sleeping with. Tim proposed to Phyllis and she accepted, but nothing came out of that after Danny wanted Phyllis back.

Fifteen years after being unseen in Genoa City, Tim was contacted by Ricky Williams after he found Tim's business card in Phyllis's home. Tim told Ricky he didn't ever want to hear Phyllis's name again, but Ricky was able to convince Tim to tell him about his history with Phyllis, and he then stole Phyllis' therapy file from his apartment. Tim then told Ricky to look into the events of Christmas 1994, when Phyllis ran over Christine Blair and Ricky's father Paul Williams with her car. Afterward, Tim was reported missing and the news hit Genoa City, earning the attention of Paul and Phyllis' sister, Avery. Phyllis later told Avery that she paid Tim to leave town permanently to cover up the hit-and-run incident from eighteen years earlier. His neighbor Beth placed a call to him and he was seen on some sort of vacation, informing him of recent developments about Phyllis. Ronan Malloy, by tapping into Beth's phone records, then discovered Dr. Tim and brought him back to Genoa City where he, along with Michael Baldwin and Heather Stevens, questioned him. He revealed that Phyllis paid him to get out of town to keep her secrets safe. As a favor to Heather, who was also Ricky's sister, he talked to Paul about his son and his character. Tim then revealed to Phyllis that he had a recording of her admitting to the hit and run during a therapy session, and begun to blackmail her again by making her transfer large sums of money into an offshore bank account. Despite having the money, all Tim really wanted was a sexual encounter with Phyllis. She became so desperate that she had to tap into her daughter's trust find, leading her husband, Nicholas Newman, to find out what she had done and her sister quit as her legal counsel. Even as Nick told her by giving in to Tim's blackmail she strengthened the prosecution's case, she agreed to spending an evening with him as a final option to keep him quiet. Her plan was not to sleep with Tim, but drug him to fall asleep so he would believe they did. Unbeknownst to Phyllis, before she could drug him, Tim took a large amount of erectile dysfunction pills, which made him have a heart attack and die in front of her. Afterward, Phyllis enlisted the help of Kevin Fisher to dispose of Tim's body at his apartment, to make it look like he died whilst at home.

The Bold and the Beautiful
In 2001, Tim moved to Los Angeles, where he was found by Morgan DeWitt, a woman he knew from when they were young. Morgan seduced Tim and convinced him that it was okay what she did—chained Taylor Hayes in the basement. They slept together and had an agreement to move Taylor from the basement to the living room. Once Taylor was free, the couple ran away, but Morgan had to return and ended up captured.

== Joshua Landers ==
Joshua Landers
- The Young and the Restless character
- Portrayed by: Heath Kizzier
- Duration: 1996–98
- First appearance: June 1996
- Last appearance: March 23, 1998
- Created by: William J. Bell
- Introduced by: Edward J. Scott
In-universe information
- Occupation: Former gynecologist at genoa city memorial hospital
- Wife: Veronica Landers (1990–95); Nikki Newman (1996–98)

Dr. Joshua Landers first appeared in June 1996, portrayed by Heath Kizzier. He would later be known as the late husband of Nikki Newman. Kizzier portrayed the role until his character's death onscreen on March 23, 1998.

History
Joshua Landers was Nikki Newman's gynecologist, whom she got involved with. As Joshua and Nikki's relationship grew, he was thought to have been a widower, and he had no idea that his presumed deceased wife, Veronica Landers, was actually alive, locked away in a mental institution.

In October 1996, Nikki and Joshua eloped in Las Vegas. Nikki's ex-husband, Victor Newman, tried to stop them, but he arrived too late. Joshua then moved in with Nikki at the Newman ranch, and they enjoyed a happy marriage until Veronica escaped from the mental institution. She made her way to the ranch in hopes of reuniting with Joshua. She managed to get herself hired as a servant at the ranch under the alias, "Sarah Lindsey". Over the following months, Veronica lurked around the ranch getting agitated with Joshua and Nikki's relationship. One night, Veronica finally revealed herself to Joshua, but he made it clear to her that he didn't want to be with her, and he asked her to leave him alone. Upset by Joshua's rejection, Veronica pulled out a gun, shot and killed Joshua.

== Veronica Landers ==
Veronica Landers
- The Young and the Restless character
- Portrayed by: Tracy Melchior (1996–97); Candice Daly (1997–98)
- Duration: 1996–98
- First appearance: November 1996
- Last appearance: August 20, 1998
- Created by: William J. Bell
- Introduced by: Edward J. Scott
In-universe information
- Other names: Sarah Lindsay
- Husband: Joshua Landers (1990–95)

Veronica Martin Landers first appeared in November 1996 as the insane ex-wife of Joshua Landers. The role was originated and portrayed by actress Tracy Lindsey Melchior until 1997, when the role was taken over by Candice Daly until the character's death onscreen on August 20, 1998.

History
Veronica Landers, the unstable wife of Joshua Landers, was presumed dead when a body was found at the bottom of a lake along with her wedding ring. However, Veronica turned up alive at Genoa City Memorial Hospital, having undergone extreme facial reconstruction after a car accident that left her hideously disfigured. She was determined to recover and return to her husband. After tracking Joshua down, she called him on the phone, but she was shocked when a woman, Joshua's new wife, Nikki Newman, answered the phone. Devastated that her husband had remarried, Veronica came up with a plan. Disguised as a quiet, shy woman named Sarah Lindsey, Veronica came to work as Nikki and Josh's new maid. For months, she spied on her husband and his new wife, who both thought "Sarah" was a fantastic maid. She wanted to reveal her true identity to Josh, but she could never find the right time. Soon, Veronica stopped taking her medication for her psychotic problems, and she became careless and edgy; she knocked over a vase, smashing it on the floor, and she showed no remorse to Nikki.

On a stormy night, Nikki and Josh were in bed discussing plans to have a baby. Veronica, who had bugged their bedroom, heard the conversation, and she was determined not to let them conceive. Nikki then received a phone call from her son, Nick Newman, and she left the house. Veronica saw this time as the perfect opportunity to reveal herself to Josh. Josh was shocked to see her alive, and he rejected her advances. Then, a shattered Veronica shot him dead. Then, dressed as "Sarah", she went downstairs to face Nikki when she returned home. Veronica frightened Nikki by talking in riddles, saying that Joshua was upstairs and would be asleep for a very long time. At first, Nikki thought "Sarah" had been drinking, but after seeing the crazed look in her eyes, she demanded that "Sarah" packed her things and got out. When Sarah refused, Nikki went to call the police, but Veronica shot her four times before she picked up the phone.

The following day, Nikki was found unconscious and in a pool of blood on her living room floor by her ex-husband Jack Abbott. Nikki was rushed to the hospital, but the doctors informed Nikki's family that her chances of surviving were slim. Nikki's other ex-husband, Victor Newman, divorced his wife, Diane Jenkins, and he married Nikki on her death bed. In a turn of events, Nikki miraculously survived, and Victor opted to stay married to her, however the marriage was invalid as Victor and Diane's divorce was never finalized.

Meanwhile, Veronica was living on the run from the law in a seedy motel. No longer disguised, she ran into Nikki and Victor's butler, Miguel Rodriguez, at a local Mexican restaurant. Much to Veronica's relief, he didn't recognize her. After many such meetings, Miguel fell in love with Veronica. They began dating, and Veronica eventually developed genuine feelings for him. They soon became engaged, and he took her back to the Newman Ranch. Veronica was relieved that Nikki didn't recognize her upon her arrival.

Veronica was horrified to learn that novelist Cole Howard was researching Josh's murder for his new novel. Nikki mentioned to Victor that Veronica seemed vaguely familiar, she was concerned for Miguel, who barely knew his new fiancée. Victor suggested that she run a background check. Afraid Nikki would recognize her, Veronica resolved that Nikki had to die. When Nikki decided to take a moonlit horse ride, Veronica took her gun, and she headed for the stables. Meanwhile, Cole and Malcolm Winters compared Veronica and Miguel's engagement photo with Sarah's wanted poster, and they discovered that Veronica was Sarah. Victor stopped by the ranch just as an old photo of Veronica fell out of one of Josh's medical books that Miguel was packing. At the same moment, they realized that Veronica was Sarah, just as Cole called and told them that Veronica and Sarah were the same person. Victor and Miguel went straight to the stables, where they found Veronica holding Nikki at gunpoint. Miguel distracted Veronica, while Victor wrestled her for the gun. During the struggle, Veronica fatally impaled herself on a hay hook. Nikki was safe and no longer had to worry about Veronica, or Sarah, haunting her.

== Kurt Costner ==
Kurt Costner
- The Young and the Restless character
- Portrayed by: Leigh McCloskey
- Duration: 1996–97; 2013
- First appearance: November 26, 1996
- Last appearance: October 2, 2013
- Created by: William J. Bell
- Introduced by: Edward J. Scott
In-universe information
- Occupation: Physician
- Wife: Linda Costner (1990–95); Liz Costner (2007–12)
- Daughters: Janet Costner

Dr. Kurt Costner first appeared on November 26, 1996, portrayed by Leigh McCloskey. His first run ended after a year on August 21, 1997. In March 2013, it was announced that McCloskey would be reprising the role for an extended run; his first appearance in 16 years.

History
While walking through the woods, Ashley Abbott (Shari Shattuck) was rescued from two thugs by the mysterious Kurt Costner. During her rescue, Kurt wound up being shot, and Ashley went along as he was rushed to the hospital. An attraction grew between the two, and they began dating, but Kurt's mysterious past kept getting in the way of their happiness. Kurt's past included a wife and a daughter who were killed in a car accident, something that Kurt had always blamed himself for. Ashley eventually proved that Kurt was not responsible for it. Kurt also saved the life of Hope Wilson (Signy Coleman), an event that pushed him to decide to become a doctor again. Stuck between two women, Ashley and Hope, he eventually chose to go to Kansas with Hope.

In 2013, Kurt reappeared in Genoa City as Nikki Newman's (Melody Thomas Scott) doctor upon her diagnosis with multiple sclerosis (MS), and also treats Adam Newman (Michael Muhney) after he was shot. He also revealed that he had married a woman named Liz while away from Genoa City, and she later died.

== Tony Viscardi ==
Tony Viscardi
- The Young and the Restless character
- Portrayed by: Nick Scotti (1996–99); Jay Bontatibus (1999–2000)
- Duration: 1996–2000
- First appearance: December 1996
- Last appearance: January 19, 2000
- Created by: William J. Bell
- Introduced by: Edward J. Scott
In-universe information
- Occupation: Auto mechanic
- Wife: Megan Dennison (2000)

Antonio "Tony" Viscardi first appeared in December 1996, portrayed by Nick Scotti, who departed on January 22, 1999. The role was then portrayed by Jay Bontatibus from February 5, 1999, to the character's death onscreen on January 19, 2000. Tony is notable for being an ex-boyfriend of Grace Turner, and for being briefly married to Megan Dennison.

History
Tony, an Italian mechanic, was introduced as the boyfriend of Grace Turner, who neglected Tony's feelings and flirted with other guys. As Tony continued trying to get back together with Grace, he usually found himself in altercations with other guys. While Grace never fully wanted to rekindle her relationship with Tony, she would use him to get something. In 1997, they both started looking into what happened with the first child Grace's friend Sharon Newman gave up for adoption and both located the child, Cassie Newman, in Madison, Wisconsin. When Grace became attached to the child, Tony constantly tried to encourage her to do the right thing. In 1998, Tony dumped Grace for good due to her obsession with Nicholas Newman.

One day at Crimson Lights Coffee House, Tony met college student Megan Dennison. He took an instant liking to her and thought she was a welcome relief from the manipulative Grace. Tony and Megan began dating, much to the disapproval of Megan's father, Keith and her sister, Tricia. When Megan defiantly told Keith that she was going to keep seeing Tony despite what he thought, Tricia became unhealthily obsessed with breaking them up. Her efforts were futile. On Tony and Megan's wedding day, Megan became concerned when the groom did not show up. Speeding to stop the wedding, Tricia had blindly run Tony down in the Dennisons' driveway. Tony was rushed to hospital and married Megan moments before dying.

== Keith Dennison ==
Keith Dennison
- The Young and the Restless character
- Portrayed by: Granville Van Dusen (1997–2001); David Allen Brooks (Temp. 1999)
- Duration: 1997–2001
- First appearance: January 8, 1997
- Last appearance: October 4, 2001
- Created by: William J. Bell
- Introduced by: Edward J. Scott
In-universe information
- Occupation: Businessman
- Daughters: Tricia Dennison; Megan Dennison

Keith Dennison first appeared on January 8, 1997; he would later be known for being the father of Tricia and Megan Dennison. The role was portrayed by Granville Van Dusen until 1999, and again in 2000 and 2001. The role was temporarily recast with David Allen Brooks briefly in 1999.

History
Keith Dennison is the father of Tricia and Megan Dennison. He raised his daughters alone and was overprotective of them, especially Tricia, during her relationship with Ryan McNeil. In 1996, Jill Abbott became involved with Keith. Keith proposed to Jill, but she turned him down.

Keith was against Tricia and Ryan's marriage and was worried that his daughter would end up getting hurt. After she miscarried, Tricia began acting strangely and committed a number of crimes before leaving town with her father. Keith returned to Genoa City later, once again to take care of Tricia, who was slowly losing her mental health. Keith decided to institutionalize his daughter, but she recovered later, even though Keith did not believe her. Tricia tried to kill Keith one day, but he suffered a stroke and ended up comatose in the hospital. Keith left town, but he was contacted by Victoria Newman, who was interested in Tricia's husband, Ryan. Victoria wanted Keith to convince Tricia to leave town as well. Tricia ended up attacking Victoria and fatally shooting Ryan on their wedding day. She was then institutionalized, and Keith has not returned to Genoa City since his daughter's episode.

== Tricia Dennison McNeil ==
Tricia Dennison McNeil
- The Young and the Restless character
- Portrayed by: Sabryn Genet
- Duration: 1997–2001
- First appearance: February 18, 1997
- Last appearance: November 28, 2001
- Created by: William J. Bell
- Introduced by: Edward J. Scott
In-universe information
- Father: Keith Dennison
- Sisters: Megan Dennison
- Husband: Ryan McNeil (1998–2001)

Tricia Dennison McNeil first appeared on February 18, 1997, portrayed by Sabryn Genet. Tricia was known for her marriage to Ryan McNeil, whom she later shot to death. In September 2001, reports speculated that Genet was to exit, with no confirmations of such information by the soap opera. The actress's last airdate was November 28, 2001, when Tricia was institutionalized.

History

Sabryn Genet (pictured) portrayed Tricia Dennison.

Tricia, the eldest daughter of Keith Dennison, met Ryan McNeil, who was having marital problems with his wife, Nina Webster. Ryan was attracted to Tricia, ultimately causing Ryan and Nina to divorce.

Ryan married Tricia, much to the disapproval of her father. Tricia became increasingly jealous of the attention Ryan lavished on Nina's son, Phillip, whom he thought of as his own. When in private, the child was hostile to Tricia, believing her to have destroyed his family. Tricia pretended to be nice to Phillip for Ryan's benefit, but confided in her sister, Megan, that she didn't like him. In desperation, Tricia stopped taking her birth control pills, unbeknownst to Ryan, and conceived. While Ryan was furious at first, he warmed to the idea of having a child. When Tricia miscarried, she believed it was punishment for deceiving her husband in the first place.

Tricia became obsessed with destroying Megan's relationship with Tony Viscardi, of whom Tricia and her father, Keith, disapproved. When she ran Tony down in Megan's driveway, it was suspected that Tricia had gone over the edge and intentionally killed him. Whether this was true or not was never revealed. Megan disowned her sister and left town. Tricia left Ryan and moved to London England with Keith.

Tricia returned six months later and asked Ryan to take her back, but he turned her down. Tricia then turned to Carter Mills, who was actually rapist Matt Clark, having had major reconstructive surgery. Matt drugged and slept with Tricia, before convincing her to frame Nicholas Newman, who had had Matt convicted years ago. Upon discovering that Matt had Rohypnol in his possession, Tricia realized that Matt had raped her the first time they had had sex and attempted suicide, but was foiled by Ryan. Tricia stopped Matt from raping Nicholas' wife, Sharon Newman, by driving off a cliff, hoping to kill them both. In the hospital, Matt killed himself, and framed Nick for murder.

Ryan and his ex-wife, Victoria Newman, resumed their relationship. Suspicious of Tricia, Victor Newman arranged for her to move in with him to keep her away from his daughter, not realizing that Tricia was conspiring with the "ghost" of Matt (the ghost being nothing more than a psychotic delusion) and that they were plotting against him. One night, she slipped a sleeping sedative into Victor's drink. Tricia then led Victor up to his room and laid him on the bed. Victor then realized something was wrong when Tricia disrobed and had sex with him. The next day, Tricia had beaten herself to make it seem like Victor had raped her. Victor was arrested and placed in jail. Once in jail, Victor had to fight for his life, but during his court hearing, he escaped to save Victoria. On Ryan and Victoria's wedding day, Tricia barged into the church wearing a gown identical to Victoria's, locked Victoria in a closet and took her place at the altar, holding a gun to Ryan. Victor freed Victoria and had convinced Tricia to leave the wedding, but Victoria entered the room and Tricia shot at her. Ryan jumped in front of Victoria, taking the bullet for her. He was rushed to hospital, but died shortly after, with Victoria at his bedside. Tricia was then locked away in a mental institution for Ryan's murder. In her mental state, she waved goodbye to the evil Matt who helped persuade Tricia to perform those diabolical plots.

== Megan Dennison Viscardi ==
Megan Dennison Viscardi
- The Young and the Restless character
- Portrayed by: Ashley Jones
- Duration: 1997–2001
- First appearance: February 18, 1997
- Last appearance: August 8, 2001
- Created by: William J. Bell
- Introduced by: Edward J. Scott
In-universe information
- Father: Keith Dennison
- Sisters: Tricia Dennison
- Husband: Tony Viscardi (2000)

Megan Dennison Viscardi first appeared on February 18, 1997, as the youngest daughter of Keith Dennison and sister of Tricia Dennison. The role was portrayed by actress Ashley Jones until 2000, and again in 2001.

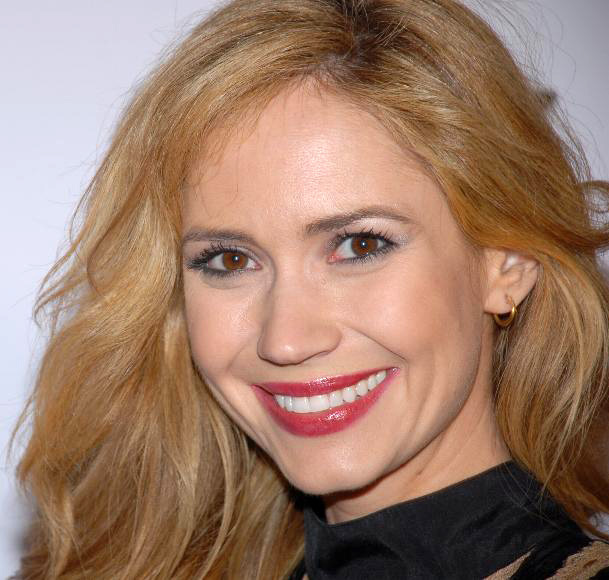
Ashley Jones portrayed Megan Dennison.

History
Megan, the youngest daughter of Keith Dennison and the younger sister of Tricia Dennison, was a college student before getting an apprenticeship at the Genoa City Chronicle. Megan had been dating Alec Moretti (Andre Khabbazi) for a while, but he wanted their relationship to be more serious than Megan did, so she broke it off with him. Megan then met the older mechanic Tony Viscardi at Crimson Lights Coffee House, and she was instantly attracted to him. Tony, who had just broken up with the manipulative Grace Turner, thought that Megan was a breath of fresh air. Megan's uptight father and sister both disapproved of Tony, believing him to be unworthy of Megan. A defiant Megan told them that she didn't care what they thought of Tony, and she moved in with him.

When Tony and Megan were arrested for unknowingly driving a stolen car, Tony begged the District Attorney Glenn Richards to get Megan off. He did, and eventually, Grace posted Tony's bail, and Tony moved back in with her. Tony soon admitted his feelings to Megan, and they got back together. At Keith's request before he left town, Tricia vowed to break Tony and Megan up. She teamed up with Grace, but the two were unsuccessful in breaking up the pair. Tricia then began to pretend to accept Tony. Everyone except Megan saw through the charade. The tension between Tricia and Tony finally erupted on New Year's Eve. During a physical fight between the two of them, Tricia stopped and violently kissed Tony.

As Tricia became increasingly psychotic, Tony resolved to marry Megan quickly. A small group of the couple's friends congregated with the Justice of the Peace for the wedding, with Sharon Newman and Nina Webster standing up for Tony and Megan. Sharon's daughter, Cassie Newman, was the flower girl. Megan arrived, but she was horrified when Tony didn't show up. Tony had been run down on his motorcycle by Tricia, as she blindly backed out of the Dennison driveway in a desperate rush to stop the wedding.

Tony was rushed to hospital, and he married Megan moments before he died. Megan, furious with Tricia for killing her husband, left town and attended college at Boston University. Tricia and Keith went to Megan's graduation ceremony. Megan traveled through Europe before settling down in Boston, while her sister was institutionalized, and her father subsequently left Genoa City for an unknown location.

== Callie Rogers ==
Callie Rogers
- The Young and the Restless character
- Portrayed by: Michelle Thomas (1998); Siena Goines (1998–2000)
- Duration: 1998–2000
- First appearance: July 27, 1998
- Last appearance: February 17, 2000
- Created by: Kay Alden
- Introduced by: Edward J. Scott
In-universe information
- Occupation: Singer
- Spouse: Trey Stark (1991—)

Callie Rogers first appeared on July 27, 1998, originated by Michelle Thomas until the actress' death in late 1998. The role was recast with Siena Goines on December 28, 1998, who remained in the role until February 17, 2000. Callie is the ex-fiancée of Malcolm Winters.

History
Malcolm Winters was surprised when Callie Rogers came back into his life. Prior to her arrival in town, Callie and Malcolm were lovers broken up by her father. Callie hooked up with Malcolm again, while Malcolm was dealing with his failed marriage to Olivia Winters. However, Malcolm and Callie had a hard time rekindling their former relationship due to Callie's troubled marriage to Trey Stark, who served as her manager for her singing gigs and loved to remind Callie that he owned her and everything she did. With the problems from Trey, Malcolm decided to step aside and let Callie work out her marital issues but, Callie knew she wanted to be with Malcolm and out of her deal with Trey. Finally, the day came where Callie ended her relationship with Trey for good just as Malcolm's marriage to Olivia was finalized.

Malcolm and Callie officially started their relationship. The couple became engaged and Malcolm moved in with Callie, but their happiness was soon destroyed when they found out Callie was still married to her Trey. Callie was pressured by Malcolm into divorcing Trey, while Trey refused to let Callie go. Malcolm could not handle Callie's indecisiveness and they broke up.

== Alice Johnson ==
Alice Johnson
- The Young and the Restless character
- Portrayed by: Tamara Clatterbuck (1998–2017); Tiffany Salerno (2000)
- Duration: 1998–2000; 2003; 2005; 2017
- First appearance: December 4, 1998
- Last appearance: October 3, 2017
- Created by: Kay Alden
- Introduced by: Edward J. Scott
In-universe information
- Occupation: Madam
- Mother: Millie Johnson
- Daughters: Cassie Newman (former adoptive)

Alice Johnson first appeared on December 4, 1998, as the former adoptive mother of the late Cassie Newman. She was portrayed by Tamara Clatterbuck on a recurring status until October 26, 2000. She returned for guest appearances in September 2003, and again on August 18, 2005. In 2017, Clatterbuck returned to the serial, first appearing on August 29 and departing on October 3.

History
In 1991, Sharon Collins gave birth to a baby girl at the age of 17. She thought it would be best for the baby to give her up for adoption, and she was adopted by Alice and named Cassidy.

In 1997, Alice left Cassidy in the care of her aging mother, Millie, to pursue a man. Millie loved Cassidy but didn't have the energy to keep up with a young girl thus leaving Cassidy to entertain herself with her beloved doll collection. Grace Turner searched for Sharon's baby and found Cassidy. Nicholas Newman and Sharon, now Nick's wife, tried to get custody of the now renamed Cassie. Alice showed up and tried to take Cassie back. Christine Blair and Michael Baldwin were adversaries again when Michael represented Alice in the custody battle over Cassie. The Newmans later gained custody, however, Alice made numerous visits to Cassie after losing custody of her. In 2005, Alice returned to Genoa City to visit Sharon and Nick after Cassie's tragic death. Alice returns to Genoa City in 2017.

== Rafael Delgado ==
Rafael Delgado
- The Young and the Restless character
- Portrayed by: Carlos Bernard
- First appearance: January 25, 1999
- Last appearance: July 26, 1999
- Created by: Kay Alden
- Introduced by: Edward J. Scott
In-universe information
- Occupation: Painter
- Stepfather: Brent Davis

Rafael Delgado appeared from January 25 to July 26, 1999, as the step-brother of Ashley Abbott. The role was portrayed by Carlos Bernard.

History
Rafael made his first appearance in Genoa City when his step sister, Ashley Abbott, went to Madrid to rescue him. Ashley's biological father, Brent Davis, was married to Rafael's mother, who was never named. Ashley helped him out by buying back forged paintings that he had painted and sold to unsuspecting customers.

Ashley's husband at the time, Cole Howard, assumed that Ashley was having an affair with Rafael without knowing who Rafael actually was. Victoria Newman hooked up with Rafael while trying to break up Ashley and Cole, but nothing serious developed from their short adventure. Rafael then returned to his hometown of Madrid, Spain.

== Raul Guittierez ==
Raul Guittierez
- The Young and the Restless character
- Portrayed by: David Lago
- Duration: 1999–2004; 2009; 2018
- First appearance: August 2, 1999
- Last appearance: March 29, 2018
- Created by: Kay Alden
- Introduced by: William J. Bell and Edward J. Scott (1999); Maria Arena Bell and Paul Rauch (2009); Mal Young (2018)
In-universe information
- Other names: Raul Evan Guittierez
- Occupation: Assistant director of a relief organization
- Parents: Vicente Guittierez; Adela Guittierez
- Brothers: Diego Guittierez; Dante Guittierez
- Spouse: Brittany Hodges (2010–)
- Adoptive sons: Joshua Marsino

Raul Guittierez first appeared on August 2, 1999, portrayed by David Lago until August 13, 2004. The character returned five years later from May 22 to June 17, 2009. In February 2018, it was reported that Lago would be returning to commemorate with the show's 45th anniversary. Lago returned on March 28, 2018.

History
Raul, who had lived in Genoa City all his life, came from a large and poor Cuban family and was Billy Abbott's best friend from his grade school years. While attending Walnut Grove Academy, which Raul could only afford to attend via a scholarship, he became friends with Mackenzie Browning, Rianna Miner, J.T. Hellstrom and Brittany Hodges. Raul fell in love with Mackenzie and they began dating, but it wasn't long before Mac left Raul for Billy, thus destroying Raul and Billy's friendship. Raul soon started seeing Rianna.

Raul was then diagnosed with type 1 diabetes after having a seizure at the Abbott pool house. Rianna (now played by Alexis Thorpe) stayed by his side at the hospital. After being released from hospital, Raul seemed to cope well with his illness, but lapsed into a diabetic coma after overdosing on insulin. When he awoke, he tried to break it off with Rianna "for her own good", but she convinced him to stay with her. When Raul discovered that she had lost her virginity to J.T. when they were together, he demanded sex. Rianna was furious with Raul, and dumped him. The pressure of his illness, failed relationships and school, coupled with the expectations his family and friends had for him, caused Raul to lash out at everyone, and soon his grades began to slip, canceling out his dreams of becoming the first in his family to attend college. Soon Raul's brother Diego Guittierez arrived in town intending to help Raul through his problems, but Raul resented his brother for running away from the family, leaving Raul with all the responsibilities. Raul eventually got his life back on track.

Raul and Brittany began dating. Brittany, who had only ever had boys interested in her for her appearance, dumped Raul, for fear that she was falling in love. Raul eventually convinced her to be with him. Raul and Brittany's relationship was going well, and Raul stood up for Billy (then Ryan Brown) at his wedding to Mac (then Kelly Kruger). On Billy and Mac's wedding night, they discovered that they were, in fact, cousins. The marriage was annulled and they both left town, devastated, leaving Raul and Brittany broke. Desperate, they rented the spare room in the loft to J.T. Raul's relationship with Brittany was dealt a devastating blow when she was offered a job stripping at Bobby Marsino's gentlemen's club. Brittany soon fell for Bobby and dumped Raul. Raul left Genoa City for Boston, having won a scholarship to the prestigious Pemberton College.

Raul returned to Genoa City five years later, in a relationship with Mac, which does not sit well with Billy. Billy has a problem with his best friend from high school dating his former "wife." Raul didn't think it would be a problem (it was only recently that it came out that Billy and Mac were not cousins) and informs Billy that he wants to marry Mac before never being seen or mentioned again.

== Tomas Del Cerro ==
Tomas Del Cerro
- The Young and the Restless character
- Portrayed by: Francesco Quinn
- Duration: 1999–2001
- First appearance: October 1, 1999
- Last appearance: January 31, 2001
- Created by: Kay Alden
- Introduced by: Edward J. Scott
In-universe information
- Occupation: Novelist

Tomas Del Cerro first appeared on October 1, 1999, as a fictional world-renowned novelist who became involved with Nina Webster. The role was portrayed by Francesco Quinn until January 31, 2001, after which the character was not featured.

History
Nina Webster met world-renowned novelist, Tomas Del Cerro, in 1999, and the two developed a friendship as they spent time together discussing novel writing. Nina felt that Tomas tried to distance himself and hold back his feelings. Even though Nina found out that Tomas was suffering from writer's block at the time, he helped her continue her career, and they became lovers. Tomas helped Nina deal with the fact that she never found her baby that had been stolen by Rose DeVille. Nina's career began to thrive after Tomas' publisher expresses interest in her novel. Tomas decided to propose to Nina, and she reluctantly accepted. Still, their relationship was soon over because Tomas was unable to get past Nina's new-found success as a writer. Nina left town with her son, Chance Chancellor, and Tomas disappeared from Genoa City.

== Gary Dawson ==
Gary Dawson
- The Young and the Restless character
- Portrayed by: Ricky Paull Goldin
- Duration: 1999–2000
- First appearance: October 5, 1999
- Last appearance: August 29, 2000
- Created by: Kay Alden
- Introduced by: Edward J. Scott
In-universe information
- Occupation: Former marketing expert

Gary Dawson first appeared on October 5, 1999. He was portrayed by Ricky Paull Goldin until August 29, 2000. Gary dated Victoria Newman, however he began stalking her and was eventually deemed insane, and committed to a sanitarium.

History
Gary Dawson was a shy man who worked as a marketing expert. Victoria Newman was attracted to him, and they began a relationship, although Victoria was unaware that Gary was actually the man who has been stalking her for weeks. In Gary's apartment, Victoria eventually found a collage of her photos, including the centerfold she posed for years earlier. Gary kidnapped and raped Victoria in the Newman's treehouse before she was eventually rescued by her brother, Nick Newman, and her friend, Paul Williams. Gary ended up in a sanitarium where he currently resides.

== Rianna Miner ==
Rianna Miner
- The Young and the Restless character
- Portrayed by: Rianna Loving (1999–2000); Alexis Thorpe (2000–02)
- Duration: 1999–2002
- First appearance: December 30, 1999
- Last appearance: June 25, 2002
- Created by: Kay Alden
- Introduced by: Edward J. Scott
In-universe information
- Mother: Kathy

Rianna Miner first appeared on December 30, 1999, portrayed by Rianna Loving, who departed on October 5, 2000. The role was then portrayed by Alexis Thorpe from October 12, 2000, to February 14, 2002, and again briefly from June 5 to 25, 2002.

History
A part of the teen scene in 1999, Rianna was known in school for dating a rich bad boy J.T. Hellstrom who wasn't treating her right, and they broke up. Rianna was a part of the Glow by Jabot Kids, a promotion that Jabot ran. Rianna fell for Raul Guittierez and their relationship seemed perfect from the very beginning. Rianna was there for Raul when he had diabetes and it seemed like they were able to handle any problem future would give them, until Raul got careless with his medication and began acting strange again. Rianna was hurt when Raul wanted to break up with her, especially after he asked her for sex. Rianna started dating with J.T. again, convinced that J.T. had finally become a better person, but eventually realized that he was using her again, so she decided to move out of Genoa City. She returned to town once again in time to attend prom with Raul. They were friends again, and Rianna even helped Raul get closer to Brittany Hodges, who started to have feelings for Raul. Rianna left to attend the University of Michigan.

== See also ==
- The Young and the Restless characters (1970s)
- The Young and the Restless characters (1980s)
- The Young and the Restless characters (2000s)
- The Young and the Restless characters (2010s)
