= Matt Clark (The Young and the Restless) =

- The Young and the Restless character
- Roger Howarth as Matt Clark
- Portrayed by: Eddie Cibrian (1994–1996); Russell Lawrence (2000); Rick Hearst (2000–2001); Roger Howarth (2025–present)
- Duration: 1994–1996; 2000–2001; 2025–present
- First appearance: 1994
- Created by: William J. Bell
- Introduced by: William J. Bell and Edward J. Scott (1994, 2000); Josh Griffith and Sally McDonald (2025)
- Russell Lawrence as Matt Clark
In-universe information
- Other names: Carter Mills; Mitch Bacall
- Occupation: Server at Crimson Lights; Nightclub owner
- Spouse: Sienna Bacall

Matt Clark is a fictional character on The Young and the Restless, an American soap opera on the CBS network. William J. Bell created and introduced the character. Alongside co-executive producer Edward J. Scott, Eddie Cibrian first portrayed the role from 1994 to 1996. In July 2000, the character was reintroduced by Bell and Scott, under the pen of head writers Kay Alden, John F. Smith, and Jerry Birn, with Russell Lawrence assuming the role. Rick Hearst, who first appeared on October 30 of the same year, replaced Lawrence after four months. In November 2001, Matt was written off following Hearst's dismissal; in-story, Matt (under the alias of Carter Mills) dies after he rips out his own breathing tube. In October 2025, Josh Griffith and Sally McDonald reintroduced the character, under the alias of Mitch Bacall, with Roger Howarth assuming the role.

Introduced as an antagonistic villain who created problems for Nicholas Newman (Joshua Morrow) and Sharon Collins (Monica Potter/Heidi Mark/Sharon Case), beginning when they were teens in high school. He raped Sharon, Amy Wilson (Julianne Morris), and Tricia Dennison (Sabryn Genet). He also framed Nicholas for multiple crimes, including his own death. The character was reintroduced in 2025 under the pseudonym of Mitch Bacall, a nightclub owner and husband to Sienna Bacall (Tamara Braun).

== Casting and characterization ==
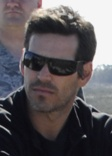
Eddie Cibrian (left) and Rick Hearst (right) both portrayed the role of Matt Clark.

In 1994, Eddie Cibrian was cast in the role of Matt. In October of that year, he was promoted to regular status. Cibrian said that he believed the writers "were going to turn the story into something bigger" and wanted to keep it going. The character exited in 1996. Russell Lawrence became the next actor in the role, portraying Matt in 2000. He was recast with Rick Hearst, who debuted on October 30, 2000. In response to Hearst's casting, TimesDaily wrote: "Expect the storyline of the vengeful Matt to be stepped up with Hearst in the role".

In April 2001, it was announced that Hearst would exit, and the character died onscreen the following month. However, due to Hearst's popularity with viewers, the actor returned for several recurring guest appearances beginning July 2001 as a vision being seen by the insane Tricia Dennison after his character's death. Speaking on his exit and appearances afterward, Hearst said: "I look at every opportunity as a gift. When I was let go (...) and was brought back as a freaking apparition for six months, I looked at it as, they called me for work this week."

Matt has been characterized by Soaps In Depth as the show's previous "bad boy", and a "cocky jock-turned rapist" by Star-News. Cibrian called him "horrific", stating: "I've never encountered anybody like him in my life. Nor would I ever want to." The character started out as a "regular guy" on the show, but after Cibrian became a regular cast member, he began doing "awful things" and became "the bad guy", beginning with raping Sharon Collins (Sharon Case). Cibrian found the role challenging and said: "Unfortunately there are people in the world like Matt. That’s why they put this in the script, so people could be aware."

In August 2025, it was announced Roger Howarth had been cast in an undisclosed role. Discussing his joining the soap, Howarth described himself as lucky; he began filming in mid-September. It was revealed he would portray a character called Mitch Bacall. Howarth debuted at the conclusion of the October 31 episode, where Mitch is revealed to be Matt Clark. Discussing his take on the role, Howarth told Soap Opera Digest: "With this character, you get to see what supports his villainy, and in terms of his past, the villainy was turned up pretty high the last time Matt Clark was in town! Faking your own death to spite someone else is not a small or insignificant thing! It's a big, bold move." The following month, Hearst responded to the character's return, stating he never believed Matt would return from the dead, and referred to Howarth's casting a "brilliant choice". Prior to Howarth's casting, it was revealed Cibrian was in talks to reprise the role; however, those discussions took a different direction for the character.

== Storylines ==
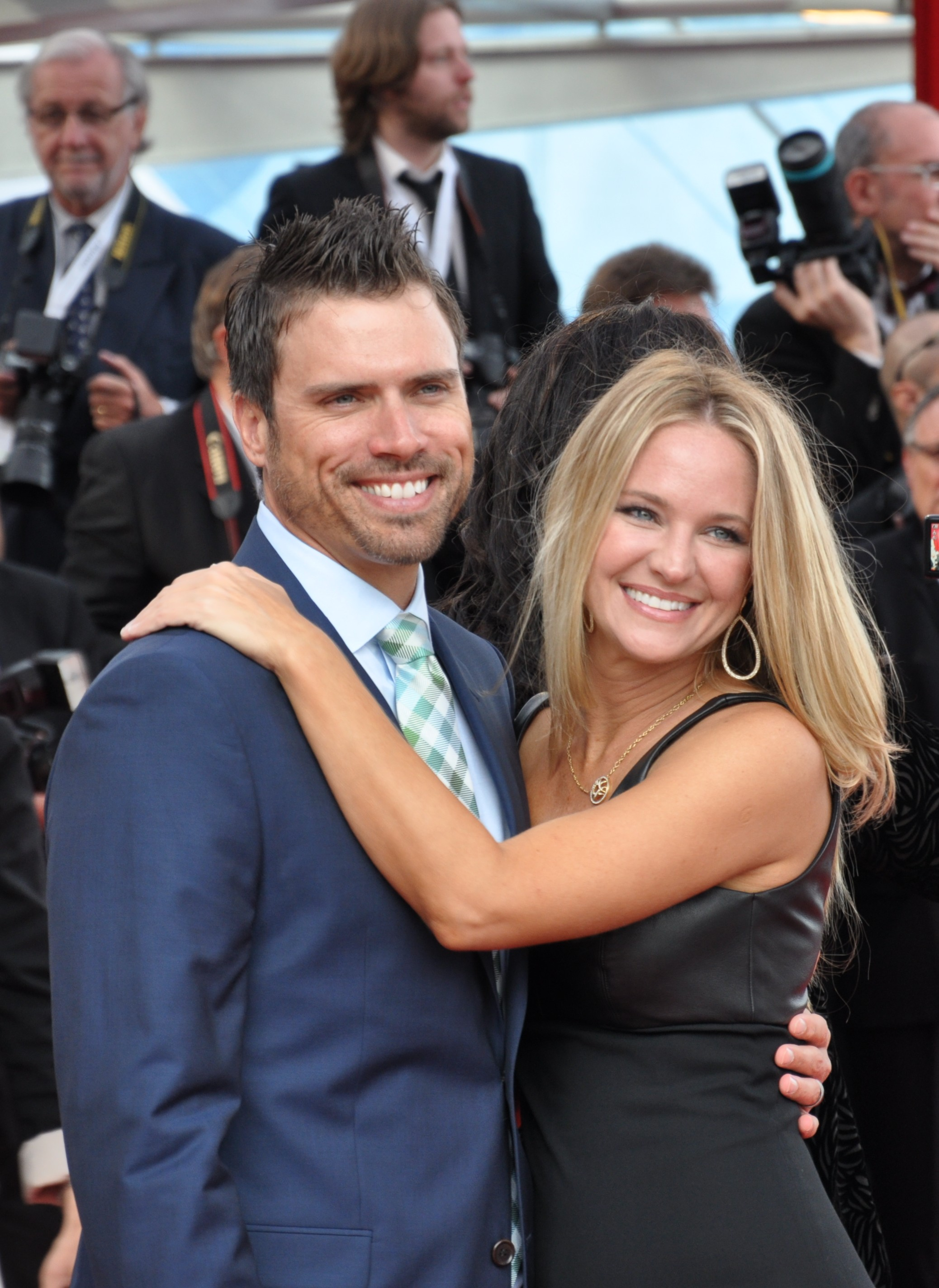
Matt's role as an antagonistic villain was often pointed towards Nick and Sharon Newman (Joshua Morrow and Sharon Case, respectively).

As a high school senior in 1994, Matt Clark dates Sharon Collins and develops a bitter rivalry with Nicholas Newman (Joshua Morrow) who ends up winning Sharon from him. A fight between Matt and Nick results in Nick being badly beaten. Shortly thereafter, Matt rapes Sharon, causing her to sink into a depression. Matt then dates Amy Wilson (Julianne Morris), Sharon's best friend. Reacting to Nick and Sharon becoming king and queen of their high school Polynesian dance, Matt exposes Sharon's secret: that she is not a virgin, and had given up a baby for adoption when she was 16. While Nick is briefly angry at Sharon, he forgives her and the pair become engaged. After Sharon confesses to Nick that Matt raped her just prior to their planned wedding, Nick goes after Matt but instead finds him lying in a pool of blood on his apartment floor, having been shot. Nick is arrested, while Matt survives and falsely claims that Nick shot him. After a trial, Nick is found guilty and sentenced to 15 years in prison. Nick's father Victor Newman (Eric Braeden) tracks down Amy in a mental institution, who has been suffering from PTSD. Amy reveals that she was the person who shot Matt after he raped her. Nick is acquitted and Matt leaves town in 1996.

In 2000, Matt Clark resurfaces in town under the alias of Carter Mills, having had plastic surgery to change his appearance, and begins working at Nick and Sharon's coffeehouse. Carter uses Tricia Dennison (Sabryn Genet), a woman he slept with, to frame Nick for selling drugs. Sharon grows close with Carter while Nick is in jail. Carter nearly succeeds in raping Sharon by using a date rape drug, but Nick arrives home and his plans are thwarted. Paul Williams (Doug Davidson) begins searching for Matt Clark, realizing that he may have had plastic surgery. Carter later meets Sharon at a cabin in the woods and tries to rape her there, but is stopped when Victor arrives. Tricia drives off with Carter in her car but deliberately drives off a cliff in an attempt to kill them both. While Tricia survives the crash, Carter had fatal injuries. Carter pulls out his own breathing tube, killing himself and framing Nick for his murder. Nick is implicated in Carter's murder, but is ultimately found not guilty.

Just before Matt's death, he lied to Nick, telling him that he had raped Sharon. Sharon becomes pregnant, and Nick demands a paternity test, which she refuses (not wanting to harm the child). After a fight with Nick, Sharon runs after him and trips over a chair. The fall causes her to give birth prematurely to a stillborn baby. A paternity test confirmed that Nick was the father, not Matt.

In 2025, Matt is revealed to be alive and living in Los Angeles, under the pseudonym Mitch Bacall, where he owns and runs the Shadow Room with his wife, Sienna (Tamara Braun). While in London, Matt interacted with Noah Newman (Lucas Adams), encouraging him to visit Los Angeles and open a club. Sharon discovers Matt after running into him outside of the club. Believing he had Noah run off the road, both Nick and Sharon continue to confront Mitch, who denies being Matt and his involvement in Noah's crash. Angered over Noah's affair with Sienna, he has them both kidnapped and held hostage. Upon their escape, Matt chases after them; he ceases when Victor freezes his bank account via an artificial intelligence software program.

== Reception ==
Both Cibrian and Hearst became popular for their portrayals of Matt. In 1996, soap opera journalist Seli Groves of The Beaver County Times newspaper opined that it was likely for Matt to return one day, writing that "characters with this sort of seething history are often recalled from soap limbo". A message published in the newspaper by a viewer named Andrea P. described the character of Matt as "a real rat", but with the observation that Cibrian "played it so well". When Lawrence was cast in the role, Toby Goldstein of TimesDaily noted that Matt was "likely to bring misery to Nick and Sharon's lives". Global TV's Aaron Hagey-MacKay included the character's death on a list of the "Top drunken, brutal, mysterious and volcanic deaths of Y&R". Entertainment Weekly called Matt an "evil rapist", while Sara Bibel of Xfinity argued in 2009 that the character was written out due to being a rapist, stating that the soap opera was "the one show with a zero tolerance for sexual assault".
