= Tylo =

Tylo is a surname. Notable people with the surname include:

- Hunter Tylo (born 1962), American actress, author, and model, wife of Michael 1987–2005 (their divorce)
- Michael Tylo (1948–2021), American actor

== See also ==
- Tylo, a moon orbiting Jool in Kerbal Space Program
