= Randy Brooks (actor) =

American actor

Randy Brooks is an American television and film actor known for his role as L.A.P.D. Detective Holdaway in the 1992 film Reservoir Dogs. Brooks also starred in the 1988 drama film Colors.

Randy Brooks appeared on a number of soap operas. Among his roles were Eric Royal on Generations (in 1990); Nathan Hastings on The Young and the Restless (from 1992 to 1995); Marshall Lincoln Kramer on Another World (from 1994 to 1995); and Hayes Grady on All My Children (in 1996).

He starred in a few short-lived television series: Brothers and Sisters in 1979, The Renegades in 1983, and Emerald Point N.A.S. in 1983.

Brooks has made guest appearances on many television shows, including One Day at a Time, The Fall Guy, In the Heat of the Night, The White Shadow, Hill Street Blues, The Jeffersons, Hunter, 21 Jump Street, Murder, She Wrote, Family Law, and Judging Amy. He also had a recurring role on The West Wing.

== Filmography ==
- Halls of Anger (1970) – Sabin
- The Monkey Hustle (1976) – Win
- Underground Aces (1981) – Ollie
- Senior Trip (1981, TV Movie) – David
- The Jeffersons (1984, TV series 10x12) – Walter
- 8 Million Ways to Die (1986) – Chance
- Assassination (1987) – Tyler Loudermilk
- Colors (1988) – Ron Delaney
- Black Snow (1990) – The Afrikan
- Daughter of the Streets (1990, TV Movie) – Byron
- Defenseless (1991) – Monroe
- Reservoir Dogs (1992) – Detective Jim Holdaway
- Miracle in the Woods (1997, TV Movie) – Henry Cooper Sr.
- Rocket's Red Glare (2000, TV Movie) – Owen
- Redemption (2002) – Phillips
- Don't Touch if You Ain't Prayed (2005) – Jordan Bryant
- VooDoo Curse: The Giddeh (2006) – Professor Harris
- Sorority Sister Slaughter (2007) – Billy Bart
