= Nathan Hastings =

Fictional character in The Young and the Restless

- The Young and the Restless character
- Adam Lazarre-White as Nathan Hastings
- Portrayed by: Nathan Purdee (1984–92); Randy Brooks (1992–94); Adam Lazarre-White (1994–1996, 2000)
- Duration: 1984–1996; 2000
- First appearance: 1984
- Last appearance: July 12, 2000
- Created by: William J. Bell
- Introduced by: William J. Bell; H. Wesley Kenney
- Nathan Purdee as Nathan Hastings

- Randy Brooks as Nathan Hastings
In-universe information
- Other names: Kong (mob name)
- Occupation: Detective; Mobster
- Wife: Olivia Barber (1991–96)
- Sons: Nathan Hastings, Jr. Damien Kane

Nathan Hastings is a fictional character from the CBS soap opera The Young and the Restless. The role was originated in 1984 by Nathan Purdee, who portrayed the character until 1992. The character was subsequently portrayed by Randy Brooks (1992–1994), and was later de-aged, as evidenced by later portrayal by Adam Lazarre-White (1994–1996, 2000), who was nineteen years younger than both Purdee and Brooks.

== Storylines ==
Nathan Oliver Hastings was born in Genoa City to Oliver and Loretta Hastings, an electrician and housewife, respectively. Nathan grew up with learning problems and, as a result, performed badly in school and could not read. When he was a teenager, he dropped out of school and joined a local organized crime family.

In 1984, attorney Tyrone Jackson (Phil Morris), his brother Jazz Jackson (Jon St. Elwood) and private investigator Andy Richards (Steven Ford) gather enough evidence to dismantle the local organized crime family, headed by Joseph Anthony (Logan Ramsey). They receive assistance from one of Anthony's men, "Kong", whose real name is Nathan Hastings. As a result, Nathan is granted immunity from prosecution for his crimes. After secretary Amy Lewis (Stephanie E. Williams) realizes that Nathan is illiterate, she secretly teaches him to read and write. The two soon start dating, but she eventually leaves town, ending their relationship.

Having completely reformed, Nathan becomes a private investigator, and he joins Paul Williams' (Doug Davidson) detective agency. While working security for Fenmore's Department Store, he catches a shoplifter—runaway Drucilla Barber (Victoria Rowell). Once Nathan realizes that Drucilla is illiterate as he once was, he convinces the court to release her into his custody. Nathan teaches Dru how to read. She soon falls in love with Nathan, and is determined to steal him away from his girlfriend. Remarkably, his girlfriend turns out to be Dru's estranged sister, Dr. Olivia Barber (Tonya Williams). Dru's attempts to seduce Nathan away from Olivia prove to be unsuccessful, and she later turns her attention to her future husband, Neil Winters (Kristoff St. John). Nathan and Olivia are married in 1991, and they have a son, Nathan Hastings, Jr. (nicknamed "Nate") in 1992. The birth poses a great risk to Olivia's health when she develops ovarian cancer. Following the birth, she has a hysterectomy.

Nathan and Olivia experience serious marital problems when Olivia becomes infatuated with Neil. Later, Olivia's parents Walter and Lillie Belle Barber separate, and Lillie Belle comes to live with Nathan and Olivia. Lillie Belle is clinically depressed, and Nathan and Olivia argue about her strange behavior. Drucilla tries to persuade her mother to live with her so that Olivia and Nathan can repair their marriage, but Lillie Belle chooses to remain with Olivia, whom she favors over Drucilla. Soon after, Walter comes to Genoa City to reunite with his wife, and the couple leave town together. Due to his mounting marital problems, Nathan begins an affair with Keesha Monroe (Jennifer Gatti), although he does not tell Keesha that he is married until later in their relationship. Soon, Keesha meets Neil's half-brother, photographer Malcolm Winters (Shemar Moore). After much effort, Malcolm manages to woo her away from her boyfriend, who unknown to him is Nathan. When Malcolm learns of Keesha's affair with Nathan, he breaks up with her, even though she has already stopped seeing Nathan. However, Malcolm keeps the affair hidden from Olivia, as do Neil and Dru, who also learn of Nathan's infidelity.

Soon thereafter, Keesha learns that her ex-boyfriend Stan has died from AIDS. After being tested by Olivia, Keesha discovers that she is also HIV-positive, and she breaks the news to Nathan. Dru then decides to tell Olivia about Nathan's affair with Keesha. Realizing that Nathan has been unfaithful and has potentially exposed both her and their son to the HIV virus, a furious Olivia throws Nathan out, forbidding him to ever see their son again. Nathan, Olivia and Nate all turn out to be HIV-negative, but Keesha develops AIDS. Heartbroken, Malcolm realizes how much he cares for Keesha, and he reunites with her. Malcolm marries Keesha on her deathbed in 1996. Meanwhile, desperate to see Nate, Nathan kidnaps him. The police, as well as Olivia and her family and friends, search for Nathan and Nate. Days later, Nathan realizes that life on the run is no place for his son, and he decides to return Nate to Olivia. In the process of returning his son, Nathan is hit by an automobile. Later, after an emotional hospital visit with his wife and son, Nathan dies.
