= Nina Webster =

- The Young and the Restless character
- Portrayed by: Tricia Cast
- Duration: 1986–2001; 2008–2014; 2020–2021; 2023; 2025–2026
- First appearance: June 26, 1986
- Last appearance: August 20, 2026
- Created by: William J. Bell
- Introduced by: H. Wesley Kenney (1986); Maria Arena Bell and Paul Rauch (2008); Anthony Morina and Josh Griffith (2020); Josh Griffith (2023); Josh Griffith and Sally McDonald (2025)
In-universe information
- Other names: Nina Chancellor; Nina Kimble; Nina McNeil
- Occupation: Novelist; Screenwriter
- Mother: Florence Webster
- Husband: Phillip Chancellor III (1989); David Kimble (1990–1991); Ryan McNeil (1994–1998)
- Sons: Ronan Malloy; Chance Chancellor
- Grandsons: Dominic Abbott Newman Chancellor (legal)

Nina Webster is a fictional character from The Young and the Restless, an American soap opera on the CBS network, portrayed by Tricia Cast. She was introduced during the episode airing on June 26, 1986, as a pregnant teenager whom Christine Blair (Lauralee Bell) befriends. Cast remained a regular cast member for fifteen years before asking for a contract release and departing onscreen in February 2001. In 2008, the actress returned for several guest spots, and the following year, she returned for a bigger storyline, and has continued to make occasional appearances until 2014. Cast later returned in 2020 to present.

Cast described Nina as "someone who is confused generally". After her child was stolen from her hands at birth, Nina was later involved in a romance with Phillip Chancellor III (Thom Bierdz), which resulted in another child, Phillip Chancellor IV (John Driscoll). Phillip III then died—which many years later proved to be faked—and Nina raised Phillip IV as a single mother. She became a novelist and screenwriter, also having marriages to David Kimble (Michael Corbett) and Ryan McNeil (Scott Reeves). Nina was also involved with a man named Tomas Del Cerro (Francesco Quinn), a publisher interested in a novel of hers about her stolen son. In 2010, Nina met her long lost son, revealed to be Ronan Malloy (Jeff Branson). In 1992, Cast won a Daytime Emmy Award for her portrayal.

== Casting ==
Cast debuted in the role onscreen on June 26, 1986, with her first run lasting fifteen years. She went on to reveal in 1993 that she only expected her role to be short term on the soap opera. In September 2000, it was announced that Cast had requested to be released from her contract, leading to much speculation as to why she chose to leave. Cast's publicist later issued a statement, saying: "Tricia has decided to take a sabbatical from Hollywood for an indefinite period of time. She is looking forward to spending some quality time with her new husband in Tennessee." Her last airdate was January 31, 2001. In 2008, it was announced that Cast would be returning for several guest appearances along with various other previous actors, airing from November 14 to 20, 2008. In April 2009, Cast was announced to be reprising the role again for a bigger storyline. She then remained on a recurring status with the soap opera for the following three years. She then made guest appearances in September 2013 and on August 27, 2014.

In October 2020, Entertainment Weekly announced Cast would return to the role in "early November," as well as the week of November 30 of the same year, to celebrate the soap's 12,000th episode. Cast returned to the show on November 18, 2020. She appeared for two episodes in 2025 — November 21 and November 24 — when Nina returned for Christine's wedding to Danny. In August of the following year, it was revealed Cast had again reprised the role, with scenes concerning Nina's return set to air during the week of August 17, 2026.

== Storylines ==
=== 1986–2001 ===
After getting pregnant by a man named Jimmy, Nina Webster ran away from her home and spent nights on a park bench in Genoa City, before being found by Christine Blair, with whom she soon became friends. She found a place to live at Rose DeVille's home, but had no idea that Rose was involved in a black-market baby snatching. When Nina gave birth to a son, she decided to keep the baby, but Rose made sure that this would not happen as she stole the baby and sold him to a couple, the Lansings, who were desperate to adopt, afterwards Rose left town. Nina decided to get her life back on track, but things did not seem to work out well. She set her sights on Christine's boyfriend Phillip Chancellor III (Thom Bierdz), seduced him and ended up pregnant yet again. In a rare act of unity, Phillip's mother Jill Foster Abbott and her sworn enemy Katherine Chancellor attempted to pay Nina to leave town, but she refused.

After a difficult delivery, Nina gives birth to a baby boy named Phillip Chancellor IV. She and Phillip marry and not even Jill or Kay can separate the happy couple; however, their happiness is ruined when Phillip dies from injuries sustained after a car accident. She ended up with a considerable fortune despite Jill and Katherine's attempt to keep Nina away from the Chancellor fortune.

Soon after, Nina began dating Jill's former assistant David Kimble. Nina's friends Christine and Danny Romalotti warned Nina against David, but Nina and David continued their romance. David even threatened Christine to keep away from Nina, and when Christine told Nina, she did not believe her. Nina and David ended up quickly eloping and he signed a prenuptial agreement, but David ended up having an affair with a mailroom attendant Diane Weston. It was soon discovered that David had killed his first wife Rebecca and when Rebecca's friend showed up in Genoa City to prove David killed her, she herself was killed. Christine and Danny continued to look into David, and David tried to frame Danny for cocaine possession in retaliation. Nina ended up learning from Diane that David was going to kill her and Phillip IV. Soon after, Nina shot David five times and was in turn arrested for attempted murder. It was later dropped when she convinced the jury that she shot David in self-defense.

By 1991, David returned in disguise and with the name of Jim Adams, and began romancing Nina's mother Florence. He was able to convince Nina to change her will to make Florence and him the co- beneficiaries of Nina's estate. At a masquerade ball, David intended to kill Nina, Christine, and Danny, but his ex-lover Diane warned them. They ended up tricking David to think that he killed them all and was soon being investigated by the police. He hid in a garbage chute at one point and was then killed by a garbage compactor.

She then started an affair with Ryan McNeil, who at the time was married to Victoria Newman. Their relationship continued after Ryan and Victoria's marriage ended, and Nina ended up pregnant once again, leaving Ryan with no choice but to marry her. Nina miscarried, and it was then when Ryan realized how much he loved her. During their marriage though, Nina fell for Cole Howard, who incidentally was another one of Victoria's husbands. Cole didn't want to be with her and Nina was having hard time dealing with the truth, and her marriage to Ryan suffered because of it. Ryan fell for another woman, Tricia Dennison, and the feelings of rejection from both Cole and Ryan caused her to try to die by suicide. Ryan convinced her not to do this but a shot was fired and she lost her memory. She survived, however Ryan was believed to have shot Nina, who later regained her memory and told the police the truth.

Nina evolved into a more mature woman; she continued writing novels and began a friendship with a man named Tomas Del Cerro, a world-renowned novelist. Their friendship soon evolved into a relationship. Nina's career took an upswing when Tomas' publisher became interested in her novel "A Cry in Thin Air", which involved her story regarding her long-lost child. He decided to propose to Nina and she reluctantly accepted, but their relationship was soon over when Tomas was unable to get over Nina's success as a writer. Tomas disappeared from Genoa City, and Nina left town to escape her past.

=== 2008–2014 ===
In 2008, Nina returned to Genoa City to attend Katherine's funeral (although in truth, Katherine was alive, and it was her lookalike Marge Cotrooke who had died). She revealed that she is still writing screenplays, although without much success and that her son Phillip IV was now enlisted in the army and currently serving in Iraq. Nina returned to town again for Katherine's wedding to Patrick Murphy. She discovered a drunken Jill at the door as she was arriving; she promptly tied Jill up and hid her in the hall closet so she would not disturb the ceremony. However, she wasn't in there for long, as Lauren Fenmore Baldwin heard her muffled screams and let her out. After the wedding, she decided to approach Katherine with the idea of turning her recently published autobiography into a film; Katherine complied under the condition that her collaborator, Amber Moore, co-write the movie with her.

During Nina's long absence from Genoa City, it was revealed that Jill's son Phillip III was switched shortly after birth by a jealous and alcoholic Katherine. Jill's true son was taken to Australia, returning years later under the name Cane Ashby. The other child, whose true identity remains unknown, was raised as Phillip and eventually married Nina. Following his wedding to Lily Winters, Cane recalled his telephone conversation two years earlier with a man regarding their joint plan to con Jill and Katherine. The man bore a startling resemblance to the supposedly deceased Phillip. It was revealed that Phillip was indeed the other gentleman, and that he is still very much alive; unknown to everyone except Cane.

Nina shocks Katherine and Jill by stating that she is having Phillip III's body exhumed for a DNA test. She explains that her motives are not only to find out if the body is actually that of Phillip III, but to obtain some crucial information about her son. Nina informs Jill and Katherine that before being deployed in Iraq, her son had a physical and explained some symptoms he had been experiencing. The doctor asked if he had any family history of the deadly Huntington's disease. She explains that she isn't a carrier of the disease, and if his father wasn't either then Phillip IV will be in the clear. Jill informs Nina that the results from the previous exhumation of Phillip III's body should still be on file at the lab. After a couple of phone calls, it was revealed that the lab had no record of such a test, and the doctor who signed the autopsy report that Jill had on file had previously falsified forensic evidence and had disappeared. Nina goes back to her original plan of having Phillip III's body exhumed. After much pleading from both Jill and Katherine, Nina agrees to only have the test for Phillip IV done rather than both DNA tests. Once Katherine and Jill leave the room however, Nina calls the lab back to order the second DNA test. The body of Phillip III is exhumed, and Nina requests to be present for the opening of the casket. When it is discovered that Phillip's casket is empty and in fact never contained a corpse at all, Nina demands that Cane submit to DNA testing to verify his status as Jill's biological son. Upon learning of Nina's demand, Cane retrieves a vial of Phillip's blood from a carousel of vials he has kept in a hidden freezer for use in DNA testing. Thus, it becomes apparent that Phillip III, not Cane, is Jill's biological son. Nina confronts Cane accusing him of tampering with the blood samples for the DNA test. The blood had been frozen at one time, and the lab detected that. Cane finally breaks down and admits that he is not Phillip, but has no time to explain why he did what he did as Phillip III makes his grand return to Genoa City. Nina stands there with a horrified look upon her face as she sees her husband who was long thought deceased standing before her very much alive.

When Phillip appears, Nina is shocked, and Katherine collapses. Phillip briefly disappears, but is found at the hospital by Murphy, who keeps him there until Nina arrives. They all go into Katherine's hospital room to have a sort of family meeting. Nina listens as Phillip explains why he and Cane deceived everyone. When Phillip explains that he didn't want to live the life he had 20 years earlier. Nina is furious at Phillip for faking his death, leaving her to raise their son by herself. Phillip claims that he faked his own death for his son, stating that he wouldn't have been a good father while suicidal and alcoholic. Nina, Jill and Katherine are left in a very familiar place, in a hospital room, filled with pain, rage and guilt, exactly the same as 20 years earlier when Phillip "died".

Nina then demands more answers from Phillip, who is reluctant to reveal anything else. He follows her when she storms out of the Chancellor Mansion, and tells her to ask him anything she wants. After their conversation, Phillip reveals that he always wanted to call Nina and their son but didn't know what to say. He then reveals that he is gay, and has always been. Nina seems to support him, and even convinces him to tell Jill and Katherine. Phillip IV returned from his tour of duty in Iraq, now going by the nickname Chance. This allowed for Chance to finally meet his father, but the two get into an argument. Nina wanted Phillip and Chance to develop relationship, but Phillip wanted Nina to let things be. Over time Phillip and Chance develop a relationship. Yet, Phillip ended up moving back to Australia, but returns occasionally.

Nina then began dating Paul Williams. Christine returns to Genoa City fully aware about the truth about Nina's son being Ronan Malloy, an FBI agent working undercover at the Genoa City Police Department. However, for security reasons, Christine cannot tell Nina. Ronan and Chance became enemies at the department as Chance thought Ronan was a corrupt cop. Chance ended up being framed for drug possession and pleaded guilty in order to infiltrate corrupt police schemes. Chance is later released on bail.

At the premiere Gloria and Jeffrey Bardwell's nightclub, Gloworm, Paul and Christine shared a kiss in remembrance of it being their wedding anniversary. Nina sees this and disappointingly walks away. The next day, when Nina sees the two of them she believes that the two of them had sex. The two of them deeply apologizes to her and assure her that they did not have sex. However Paul and Christine later kiss again almost to the point of them having sex. Christine abruptly leaves with Paul chasing after her. Nina sees Paul chasing after Christine. Paul confess to Nina about this. Nina is so mad slaps Paul on his face and storm out the room. Paul later begs for Nina's forgiveness and reminds her that he is still committed to finding her son. However, Chance is accidentally shot by Ronan and is pronounced dead at the scene just as Nina finally discovered the truth about Ronan.

It was revealed that Chance faked his death and entered into the Witness Protection Program. Only his parents, Nina and Phillip, as well as Ronan and Christine knew before Chance later returned to donate his kidney to Ronan. When Chance returned, Katherine, Jill, as well as everyone else found out about Chance. He left Witness Protection before he left again to pursue a career at the Pentagon. In 2012, When Paul is arrested for the shooting death of his son Ricky, Nina returns for moral support. She remains in town until Paul is proven to have only shot Ricky because he was threatening the life of Eden Baldwin. She is ready to continue a relationship with Paul until she sees him with Christine and leaves him and Genoa City.

In September 2013, Nina returned to Genoa City for Katherine Chancellor's memorial service. She made her peace with Paul and Christine on the advice of a letter written by Katherine before her death. The service ended with an impromptu wedding ceremony between Paul and Christine, in which Nina ended up being Christine's maid of honor. She returned the following August for Katherine's remembrance party.
