= Olivia Winters =

Fictional character from the American CBS soap opera The Young and the Restless

- The Young and the Restless character
- Portrayed by: Tonya Williams
- Duration: 1990–2005; 2007–2012
- First appearance: June 15, 1990
- Last appearance: February 15, 2012
- Created by: William J. Bell
- Introduced by: Edward J. Scott (1990); Lynn Marie Latham (2007); Bradley Bell (2011)
- Crossover appearances: The Bold and the Beautiful
In-universe information
- Other names: Olivia Barber; Olivia Hastings
- Occupation: Physician
- Family: Barber
- Father: Walter Barber
- Mother: Lillie Belle Barber
- Sisters: Drucilla Winters
- Husband: Nathan Hastings (1991–1996); Malcolm Winters (1997–1999)
- Sons: Nathan Hastings, Jr.
- Uncles: Wesley Barber
- Aunts: Mamie Johnson
- Nieces and nephews: Lily Winters; Devon Hamilton (adoptive)
- First cousins: Justin Barber
- Other relatives: Moses Winters (godson)

Olivia Winters is a fictional character from the CBS Daytime soap opera, The Young and the Restless. The role was portrayed by Tonya Williams, on contract beginning in June 1990, until agreeing with the show to drop to recurring status in 2005. She returned to the role in 2007 to 2012.

In January 2011, a crossover event between The Young and the Restless and The Bold and the Beautiful was announced involving Williams’ character along with the B&B character of Justin Barber, revealing that the characters are cousins. Williams’ appearances on The Bold and the Beautiful were February 1–2, 2011.

== Development ==
Previously, Olivia was a doctor at Genoa City Memorial Hospital and is a graduate of both the University of Colorado at Boulder and Seton Hall University Medical School. Currently, Olivia is a travelling lecturer for Doctors Without Borders. Prior to being married to Malcolm Winters (Shemar Moore), Olivia was married to Nathan Hastings, Sr. and the two are the parents of Nate Jr. Olivia, an honest and principled woman, is keenly aware of the importance of doing the right thing and lives by the code words "duty" and "responsibility," however, because of this, she is often quick to judge those who do not live by the same morals. She is, though, also known for her compassion, kindness and forgiveness. "Liv" (as she is known by family and close friends) has always been very close to her aunt, Mamie Johnson.

Olivia was a popular and central character. She and her sister, Drucilla (Victoria Rowell), became lead characters, becoming two of the most iconic African American characters for the daytime genre. A setback, however, was that the Barber sisters and the Winters brothers mainly only interacted with each other unless a storyline was business-related.

Under Bill Bell, Olivia was best friends with Ashley Abbott (most prominently portrayed by Eileen Davidson), an adversary of Drucilla's. John F. Smith, however, separated the two as friends in a controversial love triangle involving Ashley's then-husband, Brad Carlton (Don Diamont). This was Olivia's final storyline as a series regular.

== Storylines ==
=== 1990–2005 ===
Lillie Belle and Walter Barber had two daughters who were as different as night and day, and bitter rivals. Older sister Olivia could do no wrong. Younger sister Drucilla could do no right. Their mother, Lillie Belle, admitted many years later that Dru was an unwanted child, the result of husband Walter's drunken lust. It was no wonder that Dru ran away as a teenager and spent years on the streets racking up a criminal record. Olivia was shocked by this revelation, needless to say and saw Dru in a new light for the first time in years. Walter assured Olivia that even though Dru's conception was not planned, he loved her regardless and had no regrets over having her. Olivia was relieved and grateful to hear this, but was furious with Lillie Belle for mistreating Dru all those years.

Nathan Hastings, detective with the Paul Williams Detective Agency, caught a shoplifter while working security for Fenmore's Department Store, the same Drucilla Barber. Nathan ended up talking the judge into releasing Dru into his custody and took her in once he realized another thing they shared, as Nathan was once illiterate too. Nathan taught Dru to read and be more ladylike, and eventually Dru fell in love with him. But lo and behold, Nathan's girlfriend was Olivia, Drucilla's "perfect" sister. The sisters were reunited, but it was obvious no love was lost between them. Nathan explained that his heart was with Olivia. Dru plotted to win him away by seducing him, but that didn't work. Olivia informed their parents of Dru's presence in Genoa City. They came to see Dru, but were rebuffed, so returned home.

Pushed by Olivia to produce her mystery "boyfriend", Drucilla talked Jabot executive trainee and Stanford MBA graduate, Neil Winters, into playing the part. Neil ended up falling in love with Olivia himself. Olivia decided that Dru was setting them up, so moved up her wedding date. This was the year of the grand masquerade ball. Olivia had to work, so Nathan dressed as an Arabian and took Dru dressed as "The Firebird" ballerina. Nathan and Olivia married with Dru as reluctant maid of honor. Dru and Neil commiserated, and ended up falling in love. It was obvious both couples were mismatched. The scholarly Olivia was married to the former criminal Nathan, and the former criminal Dru with the well-educated Neil Winters. Neil supported Dru in her rise to ballerina stardom. But she turned down a chance to tour with the ballet for a modeling career. Neil thought it unforgivable, to be giving up art for self-gratification and big money, so they broke up.

A pregnant Olivia was found to have ovarian cancer, but refused to abort the baby to save her life. After the birth, Olivia was to have a hysterectomy, but it and the cancer subject was dropped. Their son, Nathan Hastings, Jr., was delivered early to save Olivia's life.

Shortly after Dru and Neil were married at the Chancellor Estate, Lillie Belle left Walter and showed up in Genoa City. She stayed with Olivia and Nathan, and drove a huge wedge between them with her bizarre behavior due to clinical depression. Dru tried to talk Lillie Belle into staying with them in hopes of giving Liv and Nathan space to repair their marriage. But as always, Dru's mother rebuffed her in favor of her chosen daughter Olivia. Walter ended up claiming his wife and returning home with Lillie Belle in tow.

Neil's black sheep half-brother Malcolm Winters suddenly showed up in Genoa City, intent on patching up differences with Neil. Neil was convinced that Malcolm was only there to freeload, but Dru got Mal a job at Blade's photo studio which helped convince Neil he was wrong about Mal. One night, Dru over-medicated her cold and ended up being raped by Malcolm, knowing she mistook him for her husband, Neil. Malcolm had secretly been falling for Dru, but never thought she gave him a second look. Dru soon found herself pregnant, and not knowing which Winters brother was the father, considered abortion. But when her doctor told Dru that her former life on the streets had left her with a condition that made it lucky she had conceived, let alone ever would again, she reconsidered. Dru and Mal decided the baby would remain Neil's no matter what, and only they and her sister Olivia would know the rape had ever happened.

Meanwhile, Nathan and Olivia were still on the outs since Olivia took her mentally ill mother's side against Nathan. So Nathan began an affair with the beautiful Keesha Monroe. Olivia became suspicious, and both Dru and Neil tried to caution Nathan after they caught him with Keesha. Each time Nathan tried to end the affair, Olivia did something to drive Nathan back to Keesha's arms. Nathan finally ended the affair, and he and Liv began trying for another child. Just as Keesha was falling in love with Malcolm, he found out about the affair with Nathan and dumped her. Then Keesha began getting persistent calls from old boyfriend Stan, who later died of AIDS. Keesha went to Dr. Liv, turned out to be HIV positive, and had to tell Nathan. It was about this time that Dru decided to tell Olivia about Nathan's affair with Keesha. Liv was furious, not only that Nathan had betrayed her, but had also endangered her and Nate with HIV. She kicked Nathan out and forbade him to ever see their son again. All 3 of them were HIV negative, but Keesha was doomed now with AIDS. The compassionate Malcolm began seeing her again, helping her through the difficult times as she grew weaker and thinner, and would have otherwise been left all alone to die. Malcolm cared for her so, he brought her flowers and a veil and married her on her death bed so she could at least die happy. Nathan became desperate to see his son, and ended up kidnapping him. Life on the run was rough on Nate, so Nathan finally did the right thing, and was returning Nate to Olivia when he was struck by a car and killed.

After the birth of her baby, Lily, Dru signed a contract and returned to modeling, which took her away from home and infuriated Neil. Neil felt that unless a wife had a meaningful job (such as being a doctor like Liv), her place was in the home. In his loneliness he turned to Liv. Liv agreed with Neil's neanderthal ideas. Meanwhile, thanks mainly to Malcolm's bond with Nate since the death of his father, Malcolm (now a successful photographer) fell in love with Olivia and proposed. Time passed and Dru and Neil split and reunited again and again mostly for the sake of Lily, then thanks to Neil's beliefs conflicting with Dru's dreams, they split for good. Dru finally took off with Lily for the runways of Paris and filed for divorce.

Malcolm and Olivia were married, and Nate was thrilled to have the exciting and fun-loving Malcolm as his new "daddy." But eventually Liv began spending too much time at the hospital and not enough time on her marriage. Malcolm and Nate's nanny Julia were raising Nate. Olivia suddenly began being suspicious of Malcolm over nothing. When Malcolm's old love, singer Callie Rogers, arrived in town, Liv was convinced they were resuming their romance. Liv obsessed over Malcolm so, she ended up driving him to Callie, who had never stopped loving him. Malcolm tried to patch things up with Liv and convince her she was wrong about him, but Liv suddenly decided she didn't know if she wanted Malcolm or not. Her mind was on Malcolm's brother Neil, the man to which she was always drawn and much more suited. Much to Nate's disappointment, Malcolm asked Liv for a divorce and moved out. Liv made a play for Neil, but Neil was shocked and rebuffed her. So then, of course, Liv wanted Malcolm back and refused to let him go. Malcolm asked Callie to move in with him, Liv accepted the end, and the divorce did happen. Callie kept putting off marriage to Malcolm because, as it turned out, she was secretly married to her mobster manager Trey. When Malcolm was beaten to a pulp by the mobsters for "messing with Trey's wife", he broke it off with Callie. Of course, Liv found out and accused Malcolm of putting little Nate in jeopardy.

Then the always work-obsessive Olivia started getting symptoms she refused to recognize and ended up on her deathbed with aplastic anemia. She further alienated Malcolm when she changed her will so that Neil would raise Nate should she die. Dru returned to Genoa City with Lily in tow and donated necessary bone marrow to save Olivia's life. Olivia's near-death changed her holier-than-thou attitude, but it was short-lived. Then Olivia decided that Mal was not a fit role model for her son, refused to let them see each other, and set her sights on Neil. Malcolm sued for visitation and won.

Malcolm was presumed dead from an accident on a photo shoot in Kenya, and since Neil was hitting the bottle heavily, Liv, forbade him to see her son Nate. Liv's best friend Ashley's husband Brad Carlton began playing father figure in Nate's life.

Olivia's best friend, Ashley Abbott, faced the biggest crisis of her life: the discovery that she had rapidly spreading breast cancer. She has finished undergoing radiation and chemotherapy treatments and has lost her hair. The stress involved affected her relationship with her husband Brad Carlton (Don Diamont), and Ash drove him into Olivia's arms. Brad was wise enough to stop it at one kiss, but Liv had a hard time forgetting - especially once she uncovered Ashley's secret - that Ashley's daughter, Abby, was fathered by theft of Victor Newman's sperm. Liv and Dru coerced Ashley into telling Brad the truth - or they would. Ash did, Brad was furious and left. Only days later, he and Liv had sex. Then Ashley discovered she was pregnant with Brad's child. They have now reunited, and Liv is left out in the cold. Liv turned to her sister's spurned boyfriend, Psychiatrist Wesley Carter, and they became engaged. But somewhere along the line, Wesley disappeared back to Paris, and the engagement was broken.

Three years after he was declared dead, Malcolm has shown up in Genoa City, very much alive, sporting cornrows and a bad attitude. Malcolm is out for revenge against the brother whom he thinks stole his fiancée and left him for dead in Kenya. Malcolm explained that a family took him in and nursed him back to health, then he ended up having to take care of them. But now mostly he returned to see Nate again. Olivia is resentful that Malcolm didn't make himself known to Nate as soon as possible, sparing him the devastation of his death, and is making Malcolm wait to reveal himself until Nate returns from boarding school at the end of the semester. Until then, Olivia convinced him to stay in her extra bedroom. But both Malcolm and Liv left town before that ever occurred. Olivia moved to Africa and took a position with "Doctors Without Borders".

=== 2007–12 ===
In April 2007, Dru was presumed dead when she fell off a cliff at a NVP photo shoot. A prayer vigil was held at Indigo, where memories were shared by family and friends. Olivia remembered what a precocious child Dru had been, and how she had shown her love for Liv when she donated needed bone marrow when Liv was once on her deathbed. Sharon remembered her brutal honesty and her one-of-kind hats. Devon recalled that before Dru came into his life, no one had ever believed in him, and how she forced him through her love to believe in himself. Lily said Dru was the kind of woman who did it all - career and family, and was her role model. Neil believes Dru is still alive and he is not going to give up looking for her, called her loyal and passionate about life.

In 2010, Lily went to visit Olivia in New York City while she was lecturing there for Doctors Without Borders, and returned to Genoa City with her. She was surprised to learn that Neil's current flame Karen Taylor was a former patient in New York City.

She has then returned and is working at the hospital once again. She began treating Ashley Abbott in her pregnancy, but after some disagreements she has stopped treating her, but they are still good friends. She is now treating and supporting her niece, Lily Winters, during her fight against ovarian cancer.

In February 2011, Olivia met with her cousin Justin Barber in Los Angeles, who told her about his wedding plans and invited her to stay for the ceremony. She ended up being one of the guests seeing Justin marrying Donna Logan, the mother of his son Marcus. Liv also had an odd run-in with business man Bill Spencer, who thought he knew her from somewhere else.

She also returned to Genoa City that same year for Malcolm's wedding to Sofia Dupre, for the birth of Neil's son with Sofia, Moses Winters, and then again for Neil's wedding to Sofia.

Olivia made additional appearances when she accompanied the Winters family, Cane Ashby and Jill Abbott to Provence, France, for Lily's second wedding with Cane.
