= Michael Tylo =

American actor (1948–2021)

- Born: Michael Edward Tylo; October 16, 1948; Detroit, Michigan, U.S.
- Died: September 28, 2021 (aged 72); Henderson, Nevada, U.S.
- Occupation: Actor
- Years active: 1963–2014
- Spouses: Deborah Eckles (m. 1978; div. 19??); Hunter Tylo (m. 1987; div. 2005): Rachelle Reichert (2010–2021; his death)
- Children: 5

Michael Edward Tylo (October 16, 1948 – September 28, 2021) was an American actor.

== Career ==
Among his numerous soap opera roles, he was best known for his portrayal of Quinton Chamberlain on Guiding Light. He played the role from 1981 to 1985 and again from 1996 to 1997. He was half of the very popular supercouple Quint and Nola, with the role of Nola played by actress Lisa Brown. Tylo also appeared on the soap operas All My Children (as Matt Connolly), General Hospital (as Charlie Prince), and The Young and the Restless as Blade Bladeson and Rick Bladeson. He also made a brief appearance in The Bold and the Beautiful (as Sherman Gale). In addition to soaps, Tylo has done several movie and television roles, including two seasons as Alcalde Luis Ramon in Zorro and as Dee Boot in Lonesome Dove.

Tylo was a full-time professor at the University of Nevada, Las Vegas, teaching in the film department of the College of Fine Arts. He appeared in several productions at the Nevada Conservatory Theatre, most recently in The Prime of Miss Jean Brodie, Twelfth Night and Come Back, Little Sheba.

== Personal life ==
Michael Edward Tylo was born in Detroit, Michigan, the oldest child of Elmer Edward Tylo (1927–2010), a plumber, and his wife, Margaret Ann Tylo (1929–2015).

Tylo's first marriage in 1978, to Deborah Eckles, ended in divorce. He had three children with his second wife, actress Hunter Tylo: son Michael Edward Tylo II (April 24, 1988–October 18, 2007), and daughters Izabella Gabrielle (November 12, 1996) and Katya Ariel (January 15, 1998), as well as a stepson, Christopher "Chris" Morehart (January 22, 1980), from Hunter Tylo's first marriage to Tom Morehart. That union also ended in divorce.

In 1998, his infant daughter Katya was diagnosed with a rare cancer of the eye, retinoblastoma. Doctors removed the eye and began chemotherapy, but later in the year a tumor was detected in Katya's other eye; to the amazement of her doctors, that tumor soon inexplicably disappeared. Katya recovered and wears a prosthetic right eye.

On October 18, 2007, nineteen year old Michael Edward Tylo Jr. accidentally drowned in the family pool in Henderson, Nevada. The Clark County Coroner concluded that "the cause of death was drowning due to seizure disorder," and was ruled accidental. Tylo married his third wife, long-time fiancée Rachelle Reichert, on January 10, 2010. They had two daughters; Kollette Tylo (born 2012) and Gianna Tylo (born 2015).

Michael Edward Tylo died in Henderson, Nevada on September 28, 2021, at the age of 72.

== Selected filmography ==
- Even Stevens (Dave Woods, 2001)
- The Bold and the Beautiful (Sherman Gale, 2000)
- Mike Hammer, Private Eye (Craig Sanderson, 1997)
- Murder, She Wrote (Sonny, 1996)
- The Young and the Restless (Blade Bladeson/Rick Bladeson, 1993–1995)
- Perry Mason: The Case Of The Killer Kiss (Evan King, 1993)
- Gabriel's Fire (Daniel Kelly, 1991)
- Zorro (Alcalde Luis Ramon, 1990–1991)
- Lonesome Dove (Dee Boot, 1989)
- A Man Called Hawk (1989)
- General Hospital (Charlie Prince, 1989)
- All My Children (Matt Connolly #1, 1986–1988)
- Guiding Light (Quinton Chamberlain/ Quint McCord, a.k.a. Sean Ryan, 1981–1985, 1996–1997)
- Another World (Lord Peter Belton, 1980)
