= Sabryn Genet =

American actress

- Born: Sabryn Genet Ertle; May 14, 1971 (age 55); Whittier, California, USA
- Years active: 1993–2001

Sabryn Genet (born May 14, 1971, as Sabryn Genet Ertle in Orange County, California) is an American former actress.

She is best known for her role as Tricia Dennison McNeil in The Young and the Restless from 1997 to 2001. She received the Outstanding Female Newcomer Award at the 14th Soap Opera Digest Awards in 1998 for her role as Tricia. Shortly after leaving The Young and the Restless, she experienced several health issues leading to her diagnosis of Dysautonomia. This chronic health condition has prevented her from being able to pursue future acting roles and she has since left the business.
