= Tricia Cast =

American actress (born 1966)

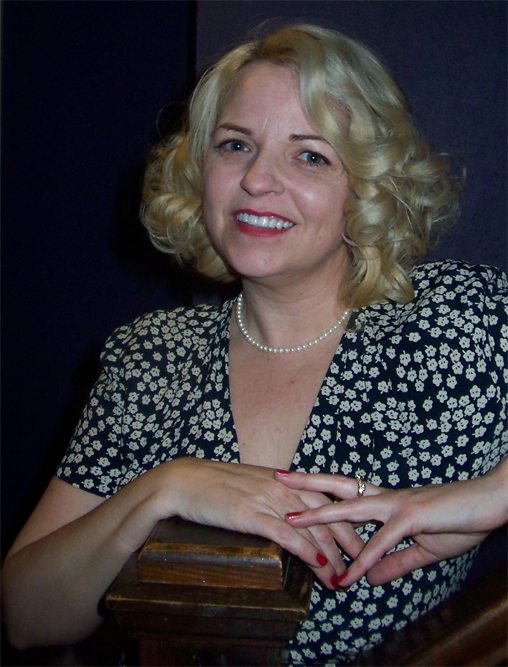
- Cast in 2008
- Born: Patricia M. Cast; November 16, 1966 (age 59); Medford, New York, U.S.
- Years active: 1979–present
- Spouses: Jack Allocco (m. 1989–2000); Bat McGrath (m. 2000–2019)

Patricia M. Cast (born November 16, 1966) is an American actress. She is best known for her portrayal of Nina Webster on the CBS soap opera The Young and the Restless.

== Career ==
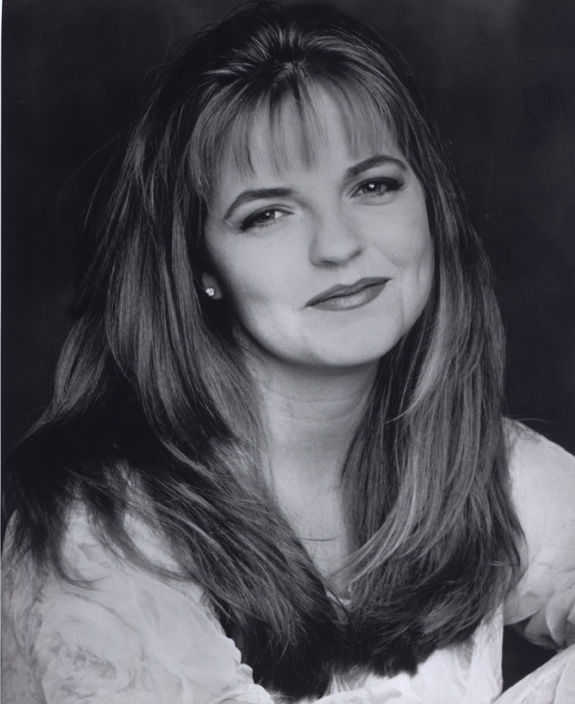
Cast, pictured in 1996

Cast came to prominence on the television series The Bad News Bears in 1979 as Amanda Whirlitzer, the role initially played by Tatum O'Neal in the 1976 film of the same name. After years of acting in television films, she starred with Jason Bateman as his sister on the television series It's Your Move. This performance led to a short stint on the soap opera Santa Barbara.

In 1986, Cast began her most notable role, Nina Webster on the soap opera The Young and the Restless, where she was reunited with her good friend and Bad News Bears co-star, Kristoff St. John. In 1992, she won a Daytime Emmy Award for her portrayal. Cast went on to reveal in 1993 that she only expected her role to be short term on the soap opera. In September 2000, it was announced that Cast had requested to be released from her contract, leading to much speculation as to why she chose to leave. Cast's publicist later issued a statement, saying: "Tricia has decided to take a sabbatical from Hollywood for an indefinite period of time. She is looking forward to spending some quality time with her new husband in Tennessee." She made her last appearance on January 31, 2001. In 2008, it was announced that Cast would be returning for several guest appearances along with various other previous actors, airing from November 14-20, 2008. In April 2009, Cast was announced to be reprising the role again for an extended run, remaining on a recurring status with the soap opera for the next three years. In 2011, she was nominated for another Daytime Emmy Award in a different category.

== Personal life ==
Cast was married to Jack Allocco, a composer for The Young and the Restless and The Bold and the Beautiful, from 1989 to 2000. On July 20, 2000, Cast married Bat McGrath and they remained married until his death in 2019.

== Filmography ==
=== Television ===
Year	Film	Role	Notes
1979	Friendships, Secrets and Lies	B.J.'s Daughter	Movie
1979–1980	The Bad News Bears	Amanda Wurlitzer	Main role (26 episodes)
1980	The Ghosts of Buxley Hall	Posie Taylor	Movie
1981	It's a Living	Amy	Episode: "R-E-S-P-E-C-T"
1981	Little House on the Prairie	Jenny	Episode: "Growing Pains"
1981	CBS Schoolbreak Special	Gilly Hopkins	Episode: "The Great Gilly Hopkins"
1982	CBS Schoolbreak Special	Tricia	Episode: "Help Wanted"
1982	Desperate Lives	Susan Garber	Movie
1983	Night Partners	Francine McGuire	Movie
1984–1985	It's Your Move	Julie Burton	Main role (17 episodes)
1985	Mr. Belvedere	Jennifer Simpson	Episode: "What I Did for Love"
1985	Santa Barbara	Christy Duvall	Recurring role (56 episodes)
1986	Simon & Simon	Stacey Fielding	Episode: "Eye of the Beholder"
1986–2001, 2008, 2009–13, 2014, 2020–21, 2023, 2025	The Young and the Restless	Nina Webster	Regular role (1986–2001); recurring role (2009–13), guest star (2008, 2014, 2020–21, 2023, 2025)
1997	Married... with Children	Starla	Episode: "The Desperate Half-Hour"
1998	ER	Mary Jo Reynolds	Episode: "My Brother's Keeper"
1998	L.A. Doctors	Rebecca Williams	Episode: "The Code"
1999	Chicago Hope	Mrs. Berryman	Episode: "White Rabbit"
2016	Local Air	Sherri Easley	

=== Film ===
Year	Film	Role	Notes
2000	Puppy Love	Connie	Short film
2006	Fay in the Life of Dave	Fay Maloney	Short film
2007	Shudder	Sophie	Video
2008	The Delivery	Robina Hatch	Short film
2009	Old Habits Die Hard	Mama Hollis	
