= Julianne Morris =

American actress (born 1968)

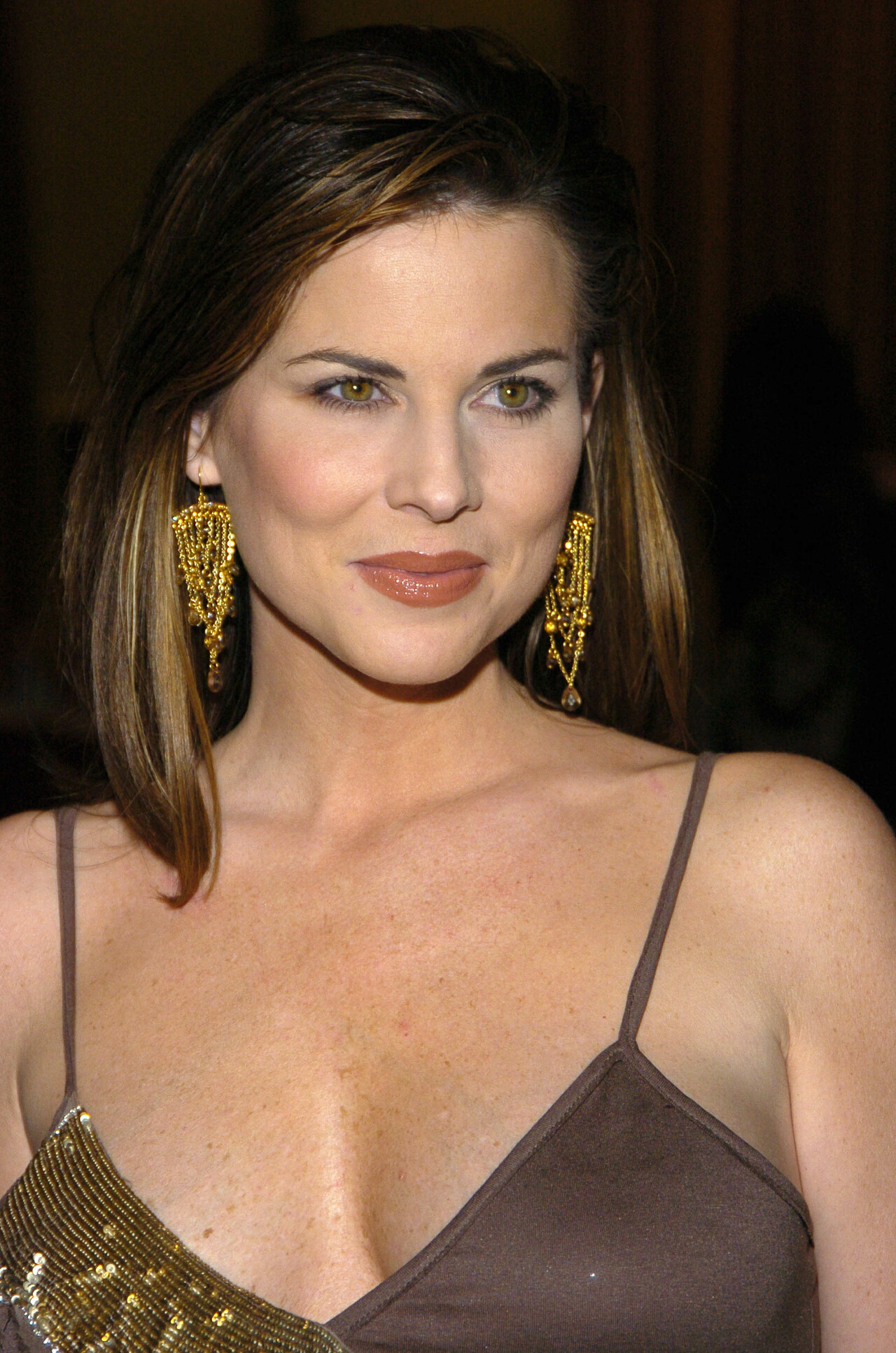
- Morris in 2005
- Born: May 8, 1968 (age 58); South Carolina, U.S.
- Occupation: Actress
- Years active: 1994–present
- Spouse: Kristoffer Polaha (m. 2003)
- Children: 3

Julianne Morris (born May 8, 1968) is an American actress.

== Early life ==
Morris was born in South Carolina. Her family relocated to Windermere, Florida, when she was young and she was raised there. She is the youngest of two children. Morris attended American Academy of Dramatic Arts in New York, and graduated from North Carolina School of the Arts.

== Career ==
In 1994, Morris landed a role as Tracy Pinkem in television film Witch Hunt. She played Amy Wilson on the soap opera The Young and the Restless from November 18, 1994, to May 22, 1996, and made a guest appearance on November 25, 2014. Morris portrayed Greta Von Amburg on Days of Our Lives from May 15, 1998, to April 19, 2002. She was first introduced on Days of Our Lives as "Swamp Girl". Between her time on Y&R and Days of Our Lives, Morris spent time in South Africa, playing Rumina on the fantasy television series The Adventures of Sinbad. She portrayed Amber Sullivan in television film Another Pretty Face (2002). She has also appeared on Two and a Half Men.

== Personal life ==
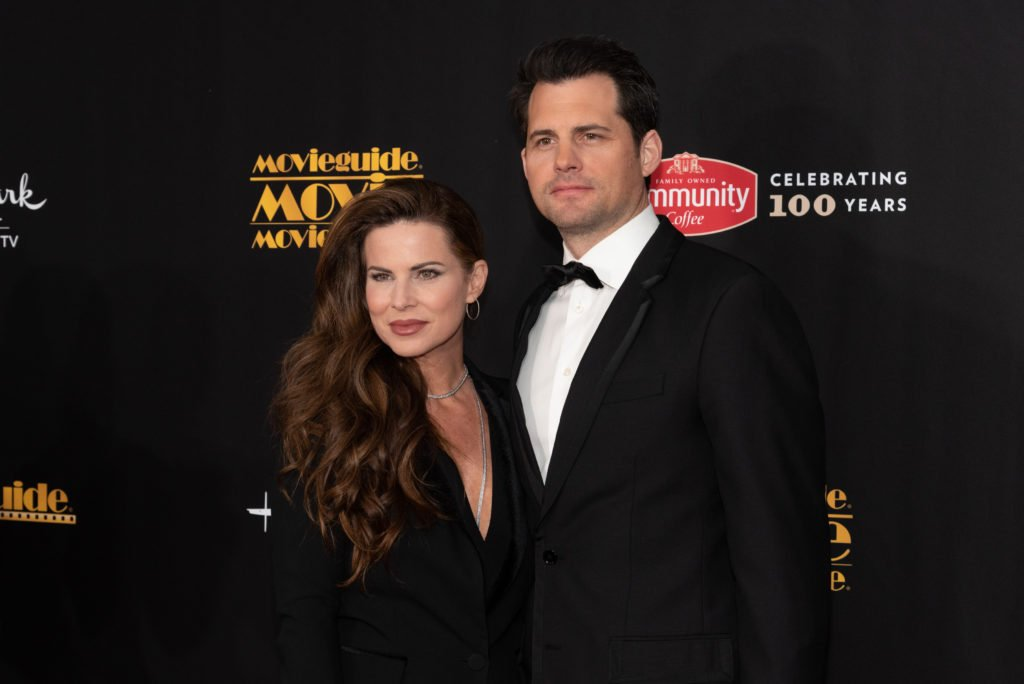
Morris and Kristoffer Polaha

Morris married actor Kristoffer Polaha on June 7, 2003, at the Windermere Chapel. The couple has three sons born in 2004, 2006, and 2011.

She is a practicing Christian. She advocates sexual abstinence before marriage, saying "I believe marriage is ordained by God. The Bible teaches quite explicitly that the romantic attachment between a husband and a wife is a parallel to our relationship to God. There could be no stronger indication of its importance."

== Filmography ==
Television roles
Year	Title	Role	Notes
1994	Witch Hunt	Tracy Pinkem	Television film
1994–1996, 2014	The Young and the Restless	Amy Wilson	Recurring role
1996	Baywatch Nights	René O'Gill	Episode: "Epilogue"
1996–1997	The Adventures of Sinbad	Rumina	Recurring role, 7 episodes
1999	L.A. Heat	Melissa Morrison	Episode: "Widow Maker"
1998–2002	Days of Our Lives	Greta Von Amburg / Swamp Girl	Recurring role
2002	Another Pretty Face	Amber Sullivan	Television film
