= List of The Young and the Restless characters introduced in 2014 =

The Young and the Restless is an American television soap opera. It was first broadcast on March 26, 1973, and airs on CBS. The following is a list of characters that first appeared on the soap opera in 2014, by order of first appearance. All characters are introduced by executive producer Jill Farren Phelps and head writers Shelly Altman and Jean Passanante.

== Ian Ward ==
Ian Ward
- The Young and the Restless character
- Portrayed by: Ray Wise
- Duration: 2014–2016, 2024–2026
- First appearance: January 23, 2014
- Last appearance: February 2, 2026
- Created by: Shelly Altman and Jean Passanante
- Introduced by: Jill Farren Phelps (2014); Josh Griffith (2024)
In-universe information
- Other names: Fred; John Darwin; Warren Masters
- Occupation: Cult leader
- Spouse: Willah Ward (divorced); Mariah Copeland (2014)

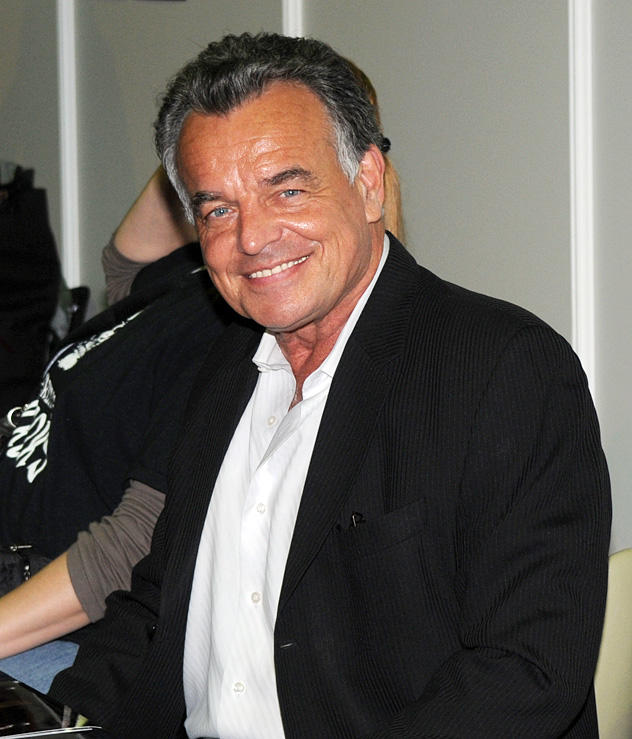
Ray Wise, who portrayed Ian Ward

Ian Ward, portrayed by Ray Wise, made his first appearance on January 23, 2014, as a former cult leader, believed to be the biological father of Dylan McAvoy (Steve Burton) and former lover of Nikki Newman (Melody Thomas Scott). Wise's casting in the recurring role was announced in December 2013. The character was slated to "play an integral role in the lives of several Genoa City residents". Michael Fairman of On-Air Soaps wrote that, "Now this is actually good casting if you look at the eyes of Ray Wise and Steve Burton!", and also asked if the character "could become the next Mitch Laurence of daytime". Jillian Bowe of Zap2it wrote that, "Nikki (Melody Thomas Scott) and Dylan (Steve Burton) will soon have another family reunion in Genoa City." Soap Opera Digest described Ian as a "charismatic former cult leader who seduced a teen Nikki, resulting in the son he never knew he had (Dylan)". In an interview with the magazine, Wise stated that the director of How I Met Your Mother, a sitcom where Wise recurs, recommended him for the role to the soap opera's producer, Jill Farren Phelps. Wise also described and explained the character, stating: "I think he's like everybody else; there's good and bad in all of us. Ian certainly has that. In the past, he's been the leader of a group of people. [Now] he has a philosophy and a kind of religion that he follows called The Path. He's in town to find out about a certain individual, but he's probably there to stir it up a little bit and I think he will." After a nearly year long absence, Wise returned on September 4, 2015. Wise reprised the role when Ian returned to Genoa City in November 2024, opposite Jordan Howard (Colleen Zenk).

Ian arrives in Genoa City suddenly after being informed by a co-worker that two people were looking for him in Indiana. He surprises Nikki by appearing in her home and she immediately tells him to leave before slapping him twice; he is surprised that Nikki never told him he fathered a child with her. He then introduces himself to Dylan, who is not pleased that he is in town. Ian later overhears Summer Newman (Hunter King) talking about being confused about her future, and he gives her a business card for The Path, the present-day version of his cult. He later convinces her to begin counseling with him, but Nikki and Summer's father Nicholas Newman (Joshua Morrow) are able to stop him from scamming Summer. Dylan later confronts Ian and asks why he should not kill him, where he claims to have a secret. Ian is arrested and his case is taken by Leslie Michaelson (Angell Conwell), generating controversy. Later, Dylan and Nikki's husband Victor Newman (Eric Braeden) work to get Ian out of town, contacting his ex-wife Willah, who later reveals that Ian is unable to father children. Leslie also breaks the client/attorney confidentiality clause by revealing his secret. This leads Nikki to realize that Ian was never Dylan's father and that her lover at the time, Paul Williams (Doug Davidson), is. Ian defends himself by saying that when Nikki said that he was Dylan's father, he decided to come to town and go along with her assumptions. He also threatens to report Leslie for revealing his secret if she does not file a lawsuit against Nikki. The lawsuit ends up happening and goes to court, where Nikki is forced to read a diary she kept while in Ian's cult.

Mariah Copeland (Camryn Grimes), who had been shown to have been linked with Ian somehow, was later revealed to be Sharon Newman's (Sharon Case) daughter, Cassie Newman's twin sister who was stolen at birth by Ian. After Mariah had revealed that he had been a father figure to her all her life, Ian later kidnaps her, drugs her and marries her while she is under the influence of the drugs. Ian escapes from being arrested, and Dylan is left looking suspicious in what happened to him. He is later arrested for Ian's murder, but Paul reveals that he knows Dylan is innocent and Ian is alive. He enlists the help of he and Nikki to lure Ian back to Genoa City. Nikki successfully gets Ian to a hotel room, where he is finally arrested, and Dylan is cleared of all charges.

Ian returns to Genoa City in 2015, revealing he escaped prison and is working on a secret project with Adam Newman (Justin Hartley) to take down Victor and Newman Enterprises, Paragon. Adam, at the time, had assumed the identity of Gabriel Bingham, but had disclosed his true identity to Ian. The project is a computer virus that Ian had created to destroy Newman Enterprises' computer system, but Adam soon begins having doubts over the long-term consequences of their project. Meanwhile, Ian encounters Phyllis Summers (Gina Tognoni) and convinces her he is a fisherman named Fred, as Phyllis was out of town in a coma when Ian was first in Genoa City and is unaware of who he really is. She attempts to get her husband Jack Abbott (Peter Bergman) to meet him, but Ian manages to always disappear to hide his true identity when Phyllis arrives with Jack. Summer later notices Phyllis engaging with "Fred" in the park and immediately alerts her mother of who he really is and what he has done to the people of Genoa City. Victor soon finds out that Ian is out of prison and reports the situation, only to find Ian in prison where he belongs when visiting the jail with Nikki. On Halloween, a fire is set to the Newman Enterprises tower and Ian is revealed as the one who started it. After almost everyone has been evacuated from the building, Ian encounters Patty Williams (Stacy Haiduk), who had escaped from the psychiatric hospital and convinces her to run away with him.

Ian and Patty are next seen in a motel room, with him telling her that she has to choose a new name if she is going to continue on with him. Victor and Phyllis soon arrive at his motel room, having tracked him down. Victor holds Phyllis by the throat and threatens to kill her if he does not evacuate and stop Paragon. Ian, distressed, agrees to do so. A month later, Patty is found by police, having been living on the streets after Ian dumped her.

== Mark Harding ==
Mark Harding
- The Young and the Restless character
- Portrayed by: Chris McKenna
- Duration: 2014–15
- First appearance: February 17, 2014
- Last appearance: August 24, 2015
- Created by: Shelly Altman; Jean Passanante
- Introduced by: Jill Farren Phelps

Detective Mark Harding, portrayed by Chris McKenna, made his first appearance on February 17, 2014. McKenna, known for his portrayal of Joey Buchanan on One Life to Live, announced his casting on social media site Twitter on January 17. According to the actor, the role was expected to last for "a few episodes". The casting was later officially confirmed by a spokesperson for the series on January 21. McKenna taped his first scenes on January 22. The character is slated to "appear during an exciting event that will bring several Genoa City residents together."

McKenna last appeared on August 25, 2015 when Harding is killed by Paul Williams.

== Austin Travers ==
Austin Travers
- The Young and the Restless character
- Portrayed by: Matthew Atkinson
- Duration: 2014–15
- First appearance: April 17, 2014
- Last appearance: August 12, 2015
- Created by: Shelly Altman; Jean Passanante
- Introduced by: Jill Farren Phelps
In-universe information
- Other names: 4MJ (Online pseudonym)
- Mother: Mary Jameson
- Wife: Summer Newman (2014–15)

Austin Travers, portrayed by Matthew Atkinson, made his first appearance on April 17, 2014. Atkinson's casting in the recurring role was announced in March, slated to be a cameraman working with Avery Bailey Clark (Jessica Collins). Jamey Giddens of Zap2it wrote that the series was "upping its hunk quotient" by hiring Atkinson. In an interview with On-Air On-Soaps before his debut, Atkinson revealed that Austin would also be involved in a storyline with Summer Newman (Hunter King).

Austin debuts as a cameraman, working with Avery on her new online cooking show. After the first episodes are posted, an anonymous person begins posting rude and suspicious comments, under the screen name "4MJ". Avery suspects Ian Ward (Ray Wise) is behind it, despite denying it. Austin later meets Summer Newman and is smitten with her, and they begin dating. It is then revealed that Austin is the unknown person posting comments, and he later kidnaps Avery and makes her confess to freeing the man that killed his mother years prior. Avery's boyfriend Dylan McAvoy (Steve Burton) rushes to save her, despite warnings from police chief Paul Williams (Doug Davidson). After Dylan arrives and Austin pulls a gun, Dylan tackles him as Paul and the police force arrive. Austin fires the gun and Paul is shot, leaving him in critical condition. Austin escapes and goes on the run, where Summer insists on accompanying him. The police catch up with him, but Austin is able to leave Summer and return to Genoa City to turn himself in. Summer then insists on finding a lawyer to represent him, even asking Avery to do it. Leslie Michaelson (Angell Conwell) takes the case and Summer bails him out. Later, she suggests they get married, which they do, shocking all of Summer's loved ones who are convinced Austin will be convicted. At his hearing, all he is given is a fine to pay, which Summer pays from her trust fund. They resume their marriage as tension surrounding their union begins to lift.

Tension quickly rose on their union as Summer became increasing jealous when Austin develops a friendship with Cassie's twin sister Mariah Copeland, whom she strongly dislikes. When Summer's mother returns from her coma, Summer introduces Austin as her friend, upsetting Austin with Summer claiming that the doctor is requiring her family not to give upsetting or shocking information to Phyllis. Soon after, Phyllis learns from Summer that the two are "engaged" which enrages her. Phyllis becomes even more furious when she learns the two are married and Austin is a felon. As Phyllis sees their relationship begin to blossom, Phyllis agrees to ease up, which allows the pair to be together. Months after it is revealed to Summer that Sharon switched her paternity results, Summer and Austin once again face relationship problems, when Summer learns Mariah kissed Austin. Abby Newman invites Summer, Austin, Mariah, Kevin Fisher, Fenmore Baldwin, Noah Newman, and Courtney Sloane to the Abbott Cabin. After Fenmore spiked Abby's punch, everyone falls asleep. After the group wakes up, they discover Austin is missing and, while discussing his possible whereabouts, Austin falls out of a wardrobe and Courtney declares him dead.

== Barton Shelby ==
Barton Shelby
- The Young and the Restless character
- Portrayed by: Terrell Tilford
- Duration: 2014–16
- First appearance: June 13, 2014
- Last appearance: July 21, 2016
- Created by: Shelly Altman; Jean Passanante
- Introduced by: Jill Farren Phelps
In-universe information
- Occupation: Physician
- Wife: Leslie Michaelson (2014–)

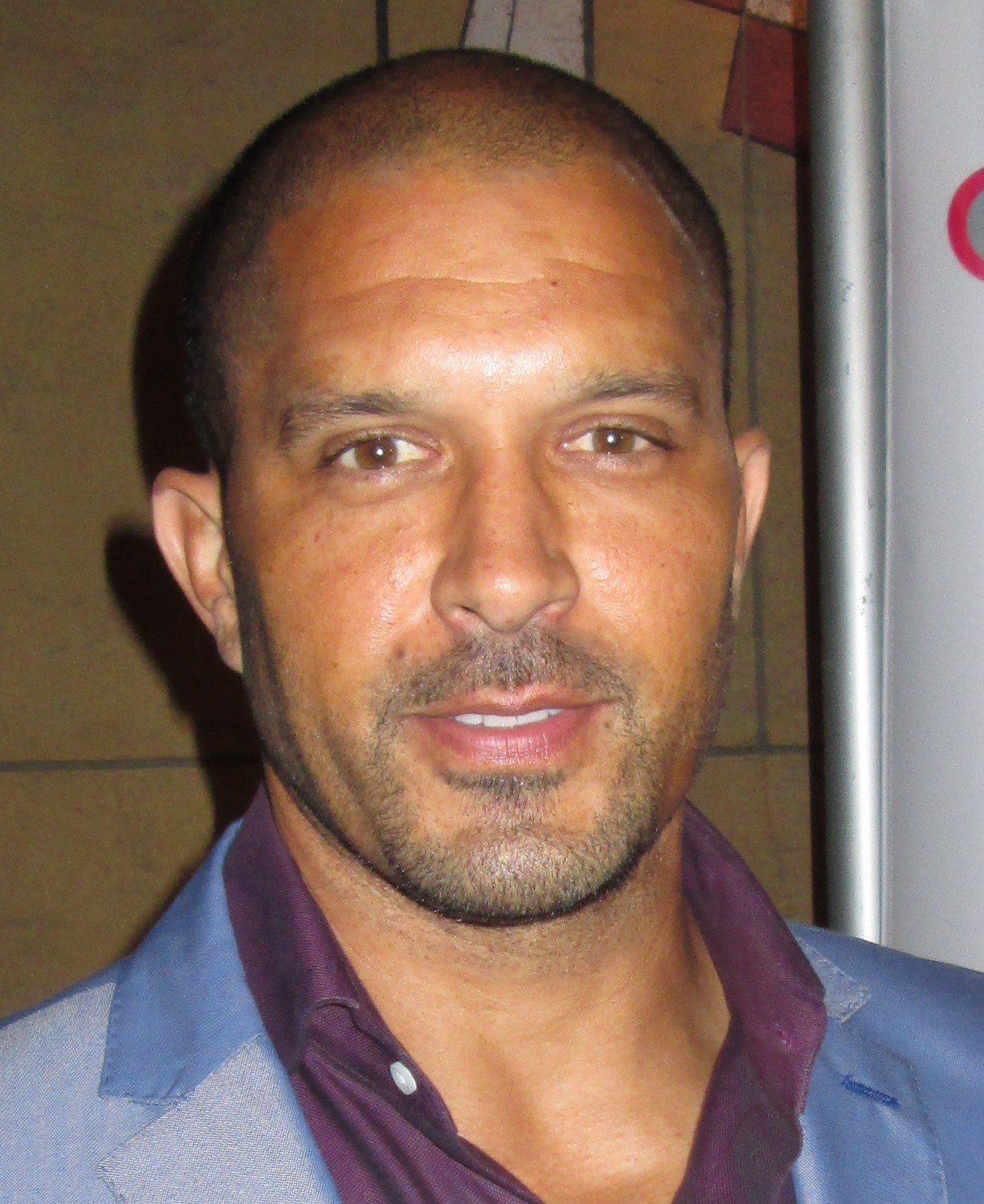
Terrell Tilford portrays Barton, the husband of Leslie Michaelson (Angell Conwell).

Barton Shelby portrayed by Terrell Tilford, made his first appearance on June 13, 2014. A casting call for the role released in April described him as "an African-American doctor in his late 30s to early 40s, handsome, intelligent, and a highly capable surgeon". Tilford's casting in the recurring role was later announced in May, slated to be Leslie Michaelson's (Angell Conwell) new husband whom she met online. Upon the news of Tilford's casting, Jillian Bowe of Zap2it wrote, "So much for my idea of Nate Jr being Leslie's secret husband on 'The Young and the Restless."

Shortly after breaking off her engagement with Neil Winters (Kristoff St. John), Leslie reveals that she met a doctor named Barton Shelby on an online dating website, and they later decided to get married. After a lengthy period of being unseen, Barton debuts as a surgeon at Genoa City Memorial Hospital.

== Joe Clark ==
Joe Clark
- The Young and the Restless character
- Portrayed by: Scott Elrod
- Duration: 2014–15
- First appearance: October 1, 2014
- Last appearance: December 11, 2015
- Created by: Shelly Altman; Jean Passanante
- Introduced by: Jill Farren Phelps
In-universe information
- Occupation: Real estate broker
- Wife: Avery Bailey Clark (1996–2001)

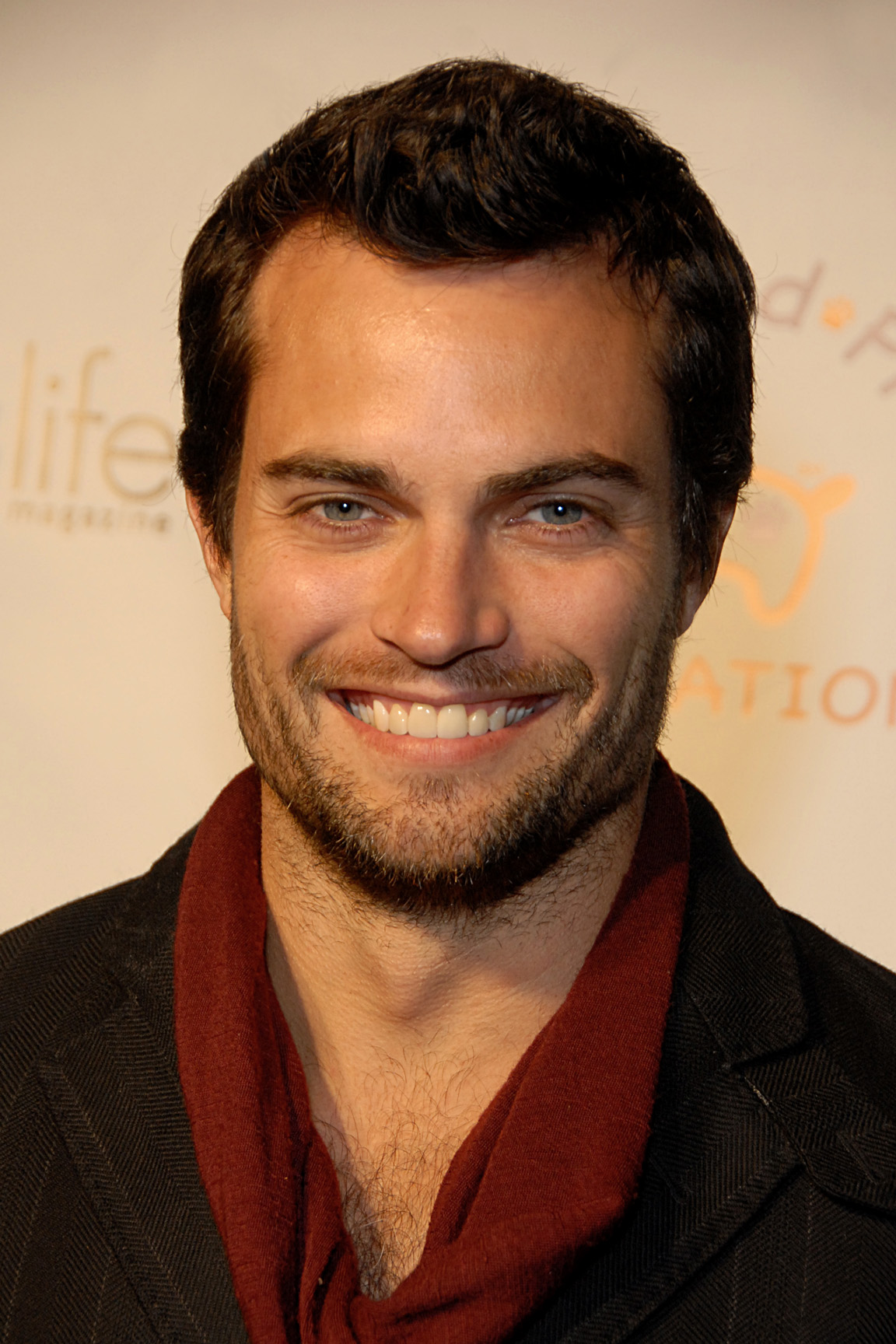
Scott Elrod has been cast as Joe Clark, the ex-husband of Avery Bailey Clark (Jessica Collins).

Joe Clark, portrayed by Scott Elrod, made his first appearance in October 2014, as the ex-husband of Avery Bailey Clark (Jessica Collins). Avery cheated on Joe with Dylan McAvoy (Steve Burton), which led to the end of their marriage. Elrod, who joined The Young and the Restless as a regular, was previously noted for his roles in the feature Argo (2012) and the television series Men in Trees. A spokesperson for the soap opera stated that "Viewers can expect Joe to have more than a few tricks up his sleeve as he crosses paths with several key ‘Y&R’ characters." TV Guide's Michael Logan described the introduction of Joe as a "recipe of disaster" and wrote "Which Genoa City gal will benefit from Joe's handiwork?" In November 2015, it was confirmed that Elrod had been taken off contract and bumped to a recurring status; he made his last appearance on December 11, 2015.

Joe Clark arrives in Genoa City from Chicago and was first seen at Crimson Lights, and immediately caught the attention of Mariah Copeland. He also went to the Genoa City Athletic Club (GCAC), where he was noticed by Lauren Fenmore Baldwin. Joe went to his ex-wife Avery's apartment and they talked about the past and their present, he tells her he has no bitterness for her affair with Dylan McAvoy. Joe tells Avery he is in town on business working on a real estate deal for his investors but that he would only be in town for a short time. Joe was later seen at Crimson Lights and he ran into Avery again. Avery was visibly upset, so he tried to comfort her. Avery questioned why he was still in town, and he said his business was taking longer to complete than he initially thought.

It's revealed that Joe is hired by someone to acquire the property that Crimson Lights currently sits on. Joe goes to the GCAC and runs into Cane Ashby and his wife, Lily. It's revealed that Cane and Joe are business associates and worked together on real estate deals together when Cane was working at Chancellor Industries. Lily is impressed by Joe's charm and charisma but also suspicious and feels that Joe is manipulative. Cane recommends Michael Baldwin and Joe retains Michael as his attorney on his real estate deal unaware that Michael is his ex-wife's new business partner. Avery is suspicious when she learns Joe is Michael's new client but Joe assures Avery that it is a coincidence and strictly business. Joe also meets Dylan in person for the first time and is civil assuring Dylan that he has no hard feelings from Dylan's affair with Joe's wife. Dylan is mistrustful of Joe and begins to questions Avery's devotion to their relationship and feels she still has feelings for Joe. He begins to buy up the properties in the warehouse district of Genoa City for his silent employer. This includes Crimson Lights, which is owned by Dylan, and creates a media frenzy, led by Dylan and Avery, from citizens that oppose Joe's project. He says his project is to improve the area but Dylan feels Joe is doing this in revenge for Dylan stealing Avery away from Joe. Things escalate between Dylan and Joe and Dylan hits him.

Joe goes to a meeting with Michael, who is gone, and runs into Avery and they kiss. Avery tells Joe it can't happen again and that she is engaged to Dylan. Joe congratulates her and later congratulates Dylan as well. Later Joe confesses to Avery that he wants her back but she says that she wants to marry Dylan. An increasingly frustrated Dylan asks his father police chief Paul Williams to investigate Joe but Paul finds nothing incriminating. Joe runs into Ashley Abbott, her daughter Abby Newman, and Stitch Rayburn at Jabot and it is revealed Joe and Ashley knew each other in New York. Its implied that Joe and Ashley also had a romance. Joe asks Ashley to be his date at the New Years party at GCAC and she accepts. At the GCAC party Dylan and Avery run into Joe and Ashley and Avery is visibly jealous that Joe has another woman in his life. Joe organizes a presentation at GCAC to the business community to showcase his project and layout his business plan. Kevin Fisher discovers that a holding company, Gerolamo Limited, that owns the warehouse district properties and Kevin informs Avery and Dylan. Dylan confronts Joe at his presentation and reveals that Joe's silent employer is Dylan's stepfather Victor Newman. Dylan and his mother Nikki Newman confront Victor and Dylan again attempts to assault Joe. Later Joe asks Victor if he is going to back out of the deal and Victor replies that he never backs out of a deal.

After Dylan and Avery break up, Joe continues to make advances toward her, wanting to reunite. On one occasion, Avery accidentally pushes Joe over the balcony of her apartment when he tried to kiss her; he survives with minor injuries. Soon after, Avery is raped in an alleyway and is adamant that Joe is the man who attacked and raped her. Joe tells both Avery and the police that he did not assault her, physically or sexually, and the Genoa City police later find proof that Avery was attacked by a group of men, none of which were Joe. Avery, feeling lost and at a crossroads in her personal life, later leaves town to find herself, upsetting Joe. He then begins an affair with Lily, angering Cane. Lily initially threw herself at Joe as she believed Cane was having an affair with Lauren, when all Cane and Lauren shared was a kiss. Lily continued to sleep with Joe to spite Cane after their marital problems increased. Afterward, Cane is implicated in Hilary Curtis' (Mishael Morgan) disappearance when a bag of ransom money that was mentioned is found in a closet in Lily and Cane's home. Cane swears he is innocent and that he must have been framed, but Lily refuses to believe him and he is further alienated by the Winters family. Months later, it is revealed that Joe planted the money in the closet to secure his relationship with Lily, knowing that Cane would be implicated in Hilary's disappearance. Lily, convinced by Cane that Joe is dangerous, promptly ends her affair with him, and Joe is then arrested by Genoa City Police Chief Paul Williams and is extradited back to his hometown in Chicago offscreen to face charges in framing Cane for kidnapping Hilary.

== Sage Warner ==
Sage Warner Newman
- The Young and the Restless character
- Portrayed by: Kelly Sullivan
- Duration: 2014–16
- First appearance: October 28, 2014
- Last appearance: June 22, 2016
- Introduced by: Jill Farren Phelps
In-universe information
- Other names: Sage Bingham; Sage Newman
- Occupation: Manager of The Underground
- Husband: Gabriel Bingham (2014); Nicholas Newman (2015–16)
- Sons: Christian Newman

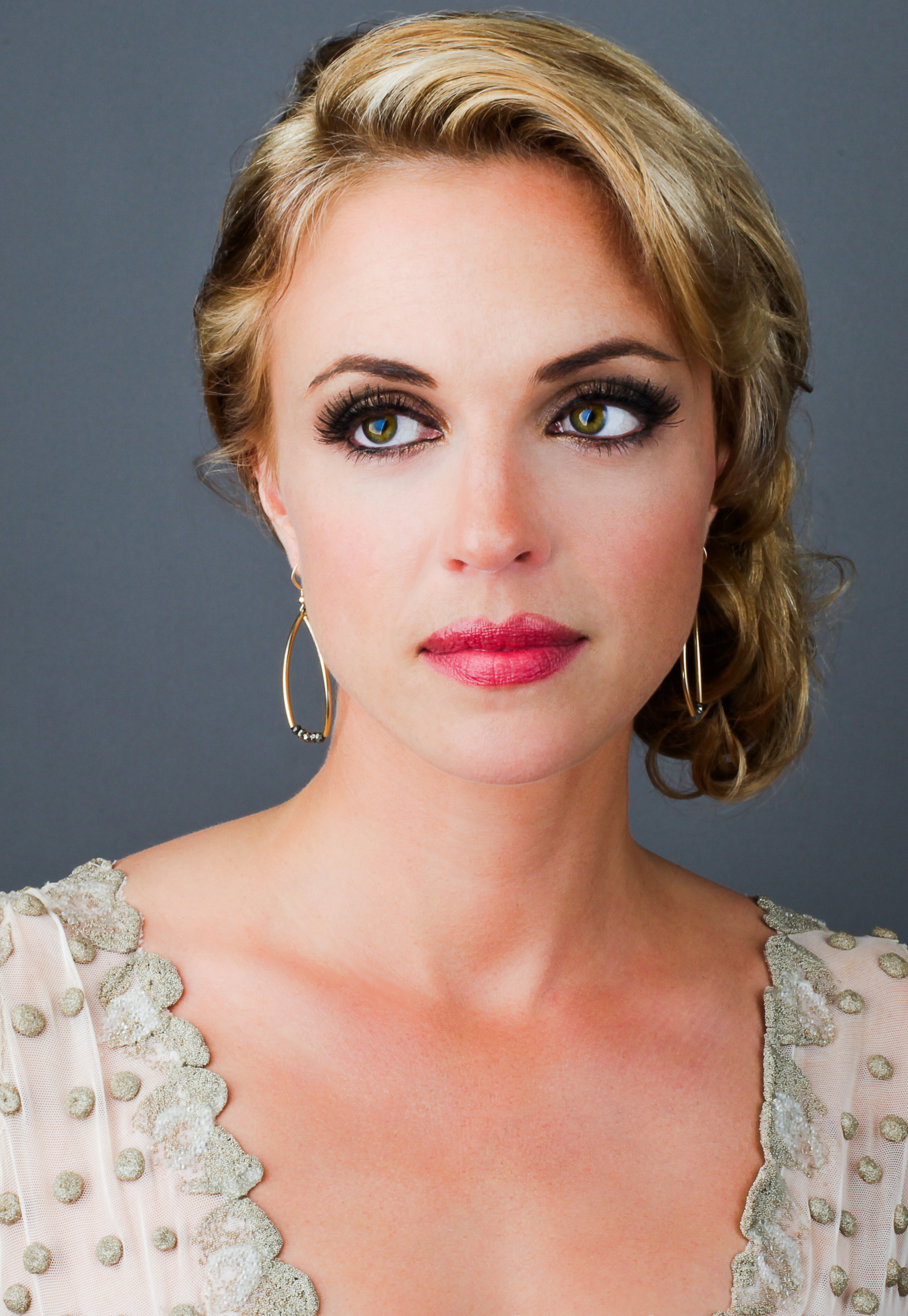
Kelly Sullivan joined the cast as Sage, caretaker to Constance Bingham and cohort to Adam Newman.

Sage Warner Newman, portrayed by actress Kelly Sullivan, made her first appearance October 28, 2014. Sullivan previously portrayed Connie Falconeri on General Hospital. The character's debut was to coincide with the plot involving the return of Adam Newman (portrayed by Justin Hartley at the time), after a long period off screen. Sage is first seen covered in a long scarf at the hospital's chapel, after which she takes an item that Adam's wife, Chelsea Lawson (Melissa Claire Egan), had left behind. She later anonymously returns it to Chelsea's doorstep.

After Adam and Billy Abbott (Billy Miller) got into a car crash in the woods, another man by the name of Gabriel Bingham was killed. Sage found Adam lying in the rubble, barely recognizable because of his injuries. She brought him to Gabriel's grandmother's house, and hired doctors in order to help him heal. Sage, aware of who Adam was, also hired a plastic surgeon, in order to make Adam pass off as Gabriel Bingham. Adam could pass off as another man in order to avoid law enforcement after he accidentally killed Billy's daughter in a car accident. After Constance passes away, Sage reveals that she is Gabriel's wife, that she married Gabriel the day that he died in the car crash, and that they would have to stay married for three years in order to receive Constance's inheritance.

She encounters Chelsea and Billy (Burgess Jenkins) for the first time at Delia's memorial site next to the road, as she was caught spying on them. She unconvincingly told them that her car had broken down. Adam, adamant on reuniting with Chelsea and their son Connor, moves to Genoa City with Sage. Posing as husband and wife, Sage goes along with the act in order to ensure that no one becomes suspicious of Adam's true identity. They eventually buy an apartment across the hall from Chelsea and her boyfriend, Billy. After many encounters, Sage and Adam reveal to Billy and Chelsea that their marriage was for money, rather than for love. She also reveals that she is infertile and therefore incapable of having children, after which Adam surprisingly comforts her. Billy later invites Sage and Adam to stay at the Abbott mansion, as their apartments caught fire, and he was suspicious that Adam, posing as Gabriel, was getting close to his now fiancée, Chelsea.

Sage also gets involved with Adam's brother, Nicholas Newman (Joshua Morrow). She first sees him unconscious near Constance's house, as he was bleeding a lot after being caught in a bear trap. After calling the ambulance, she quickly flees. When she arrives in Genoa City, she goes to the Underground, which was the club that Nick owned. Nick recognizes her, and thanks her for her help. After getting relatively close, Sage reveals to Nick that she is married to Gabriel, who is in fact one of Nick's friends from boarding school. However, this did not stop Sage from comforting Nick as he was going through a rough time while dealing with the custody case between him and Sharon Newman (Sharon Case) over their daughter, Faith. Sage later revealed to him that her marriage to Gabriel was in fact a marriage of convenience, and that there was nothing else to it. Nick and Sage had various discussions about her "arrangement" with Gabriel, Nick believing that Sage is sacrificing her life without just cause.

As Nick and Sage share a kiss in the Underground on Valentine's Day, the ceiling collapses, and Nick pushes Sage out of the way. Both of them escape without harm. Sage also meets Nick's daughter, Faith, who is unimpressed with Sage, seeing her as a threat to her family. Sage, on the other hand, responds nicely and tries to befriend her, which turned out to be a wasted effort. As the Underground was being rebuilt, Sage went to go visit Nick several times. Sharon eventually walks in on them having sex amongst the construction materials in the storage room. Sage later tells Adam that she is seeing Nick, and Adam is extremely taken aback yet unhappy. However, he uses this information to seek comfort from Chelsea, making her think that he is in love with Sage, and that she does not feel the same.

After Adam tells Chelsea that Sage was in love with another man, Chelsea confronts Sage and demands an explanation. Sage tells Chelsea that she has been played this whole time, and that all the events that lead up to "Gabriel" and Chelsea's friendship was a scam. She hints to Chelsea that Gabriel isn't who she really thinks he is, almost revealing his true identity. Adam and Sage meet up at the Athletic Club to meet with the attorney who is in charge of giving them Constance's inheritance. Sage lashes out at "Gabriel" in front of the attorney, tells him that he does not deserve the inheritance, and that she is filing for divorce. She later runs into Nick, tells her she has moved out and is divorcing Gabriel. After telling him that he's the reason why she has done this, they make love in her suite.

Sage marries Nick, when the truth behind Adam's true identity comes out, putting a brief strain on her marriage to Nick. Sage becomes pregnant, giving birth to her son, Christian Newman prematurely. When Christian passes away suddenly in the weeks following his birth, it is revealed that Adam is the birth father of Christian, not Nick, unbeknownst to Sage's knowledge. Riddled with grief, Sage grows distant from Nick; the pair eventually reconcile and plan to adopt a child in an attempt to build their family together. When their planned adoption falls through, the pair agree to eventually try adoption again. Sage then grows an attachment to Sharon's son, Sullivan, who is later discovered to actually be Christian; confronting Sharon, Sage demands her son be returned to her. When Sharon refuses, Sage leaves and attempts to find Nick. Becoming distracted while driving and using her cell phone, Sage has a car accident; discovered by Sharon, Sage holds Christian in her arms for the final time before dying on April 29, 2016, from injuries sustained from the accident.

In May 2016, Sullivan dropped to recurring status after her characters death, by appearing in Sharon's dreams and visions, haunting Sharon to tell Nick that Sully is really Christian. Her recurring tenure ended in the end of October that year, when Sharon finally confessed to Nick.

== Constance Bingham ==
Constance Bingham
- The Young and the Restless character
- Portrayed by: Sally Kellerman
- Duration: 2014–15
- First appearance: November 13, 2014
- Last appearance: January 2, 2015
- Introduced by: Jill Farren Phelps
In-universe information
- Husband: Harrison Bingham, Sr.
- Sons: Harrison Bingham, Jr.
- Grandsons: Gabriel Bingham

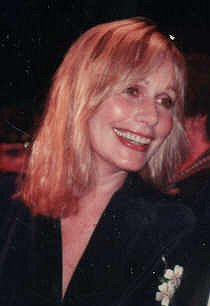
Sally Kellerman played Constance Bingham for a number of episodes in late 2014.

Constance Bingham, portrayed by Sally Kellerman, first appeared on November 13, 2014, for a multiple episode stint. News that the Oscar-nominated actress had been cast on the soap was announced on October 2. A casting call, released in September, described Constance as being "in her 70s, a sweet and old fashion grandmother who is active and alert even though she's in a wheelchair." Kellerman began taping on October 8. It was revealed that Constance would be interacting with several characters. This marks the first time Kellerman had appeared on a soap opera, with the longtime actress stating, "I'm really excited. I really am, but God help me." Additionally, referring to the fast pace of daytime dramas in comparison to other mediums, Kellerman confessed: "I never thought about doing a daytime soap before, not even for a moment. I am on my knees in adulation for the people who do this (...) I kept thinking to myself, “How could I have possibly signed up for this?”"

The character appeared in a storyline which assisted the return of the character Adam Newman, after being recast with Justin Hartley. Adam has had excessive reconstructive surgery to look like her deceased grandson, Gabriel, and Constance believes that he is Gabriel. In actuality, the real Gabriel had died months prior saving Adam. Sage Warner (Kelly Sullivan), a woman who has been living with Constance for years since the death of her parents, is involved in the scheme to pass Adam off as Gabriel. Speaking of the character, Kellerman said: "She is a good person, and she doesn't like her enemies. She is part of one family, and there is another family that has bad people in it (...) She loves her grandson and she loves Sage, and Sage loves her, too. Sage is caught in the middle of a lot of stuff; she is the character that is walking a fine line." Constance' health deteriorates and she is dying. Adam, as "Gabriel", goes to say goodbye to her. Constance tells "Gabriel" about her animosity towards Victor Newman (Eric Braeden), Adam's father, and the Newman family. This is due to the fact that Victor orchestrated a hostile takeover of Gabriel's father's company which led to him committing suicide. Constance asks "Gabriel" to avenge the death of his father.

== Katie Abbott ==
Katie Abbott
- The Young and the Restless character
- Portrayed by: Reese and Kennedy Staib (2014–16); Sienna Mercuri (2016–present)
- Duration: 2014–2021; 2024–present
- First appearance: November 17, 2014
- Created by: Jean Passanante and Shelly Altman
- Introduced by: Jill Farren Phelps (2014); Josh Griffith (2024)
In-universe information
- Other names: Katherine Rose Abbott; Katie Abbott
- Family: Newman
- Father: Billy Abbott
- Mother: Victoria Newman
- Half-brothers: Reed Hellstrom; Johnny Abbott
- Half-sisters: Claire Newman; Delia Abbott; Ruby Abbott
- Grandfathers: John Abbott; Victor Newman
- Grandmothers: Jill Abbott; Nikki Newman
- Uncles: Jack Abbott; Phillip Chancellor III; Dylan McAvoy; Nicholas Newman; John Abbott III; Adam Newman
- Aunts: Ashley Abbott (legal); Traci Abbott; Abby Newman
- First cousins: Chance Chancellor; Colleen Carlton; Kyle Abbott; Abby Newman (legal); Robert Carlton (legal); Keemo Volien Abbott; John Abbott III; Cassie Newman (adoptive); Noah Newman; Summer Newman; Faith Newman; Connor Newman; Christian Newman; Dominic Abbott Newman Winters Chancellor
- Other relatives: Jack Abbott (godfather); Abby Newman (godmother); Allie Nguyen; Harrison Locke

Katie Abbott was born onscreen on November 17, 2014. Katie is the daughter of Billy Abbott (Jason Thompson) and Victoria Newman (Amelia Heinle). When she was born, Victoria was not sure if Billy or Stitch Rayburn (Sean Carrigan) was her father.

Victoria goes into labor after Maureen Russell (Meredith Baxter) locks her in a storage closet in Jabot's parking lot. Stitch and Billy find her, and deliver her baby in the parking garage. Victoria and Abby Newman (Melissa Ordway) reveal her name at the Newman family Thanksgiving dinner: Katherine "Katie" Newman, in honor of Katherine Chancellor (Jeanne Cooper). Victoria later learns that Billy is Katherine's biological father. Victoria and Billy decide on the middle name "Rose" in honor of Katie's sister Delia Abbott, who loved tea roses. Katie is christened as Katherine Rose Abbott Newman with Jack Abbott (Peter Bergman) and Abby as her godparents.

In 2018, Katie takes kindly to Victoria and J.T’s relationship.

In early 2019, Katie is kidnapped by a mystery person at the Newman Ranch. Katie at first is confused as to who he is, but later gives her father Billy Abbott a clue to as who it could have been, when she sings a song that the presumably deceased J.T. Hellstrom sang to a young Reed Hellstrom, gives the ultimate clue to J.T. bring alive.

== Gwen Randall ==
Gwen Randall
- The Young and the Restless character
- Portrayed by: Nadine Nicole
- Duration: 2014–15
- First appearance: December 3, 2014
- Last appearance: December 23, 2015
- Introduced by: Jill Farren Phelps
In-universe information
- Sisters: Emma Randall

Gwen Randall, portrayed by Nadine Nicole, made her first appearance on December 3, 2014. Gwen is an accountant at Jabot Cosmetics. The initial casting call for Gwen described her "as being either Asian or Latina, and in her 20s. She’s an introverted accountant during the day, but once the sun goes down she’s a party girl!" Soap Opera Digest revealed that her character is "conservative", but also someone who becomes a "different person" at night. In response to this, Luke Kerr of Daytime Confidential wrote: "Now whatever could that mean? Is she a government spy, a lady of the night, a vampire? There are so many possibilities." Nicole, who previously appeared on shows such as CSI, 90210 and The Bold and the Beautiful, will portray Gwen on a recurring basis. Gwen first appears as someone Hilary Curtis (Mishael Morgan) enlists to pretend to be Devon Hamilton's (Bryton James) girlfriend. This is due to the fact that Hilary is having an affair with Devon while married to his blind father, Neil Winters (Kristoff St. John).

== Tobias Gray ==
Tobias Gray, portrayed by Jeffrey Christopher Todd in a recurring capacity, made his first appearance on December 5, 2014. Tobias is a Jabot Cosmetics employee, working as a lab tech for Ashley Abbott (Eileen Davidson) who is developing a new fragrance. The casting call for Tobias, released in October, described the character as a lab technician in his mid 20s to early 30s who is "quirky" but also has a "cold, calculating energy about him". The role was stated to be a major part, with the series looking for what they described as a "charactery" actor to play the role. In response, On-Air On-Soaps likened this description to the character Damien Spinelli (Bradford Anderson) from General Hospital with "an edge". Todd's casting was announced on November 3, having begun filming on October 24. Tobias is a lab tech in Jabot, working for Ashley, but quickly appears to be a spy hired by Victor Newman (Eric Braeden) to divulge details to him about Ashley's developing fragrance. Ashley realizes that Tobias is a spy for Victor, and feeds him misinformation about the scent. After showing up at an event at the Genoa City Athletic Club intoxicated, Tobias leaves and is involved in a fatal car crash. Before succumbing to his injuries, he manages to mention the name Austin. Evidence implicating him in the murders of both Austin and Courtney is then found in his hotel room by Kevin Fisher and Mariah Copeland. His final airdate is May 27, 2015.

== Others ==
Date(s)	Character	Actor	Information
January 20–22, August 28-September 2, 2014	Clarence	J. Downing	Clarence appeared as someone who works at an organization called The Path, founded by Ian Ward (Ray Wise), who was going under an alias. He claimed to know nothing of an Ian Ward to his biological son, Dylan McAvoy (Steve Burton), but later called Ian to warn him. Clarence reappears in August when Ian had kidnapped Mariah Copeland (Camryn Grimes) and officates their wedding.
January 22 & February 6, 2014	Himself	David Tutera	David Tutera airs as himself, hired by Gloria Bardwell (Judith Chapman) to plan the wedding of Neil Winters (Kristoff St. John) and Leslie Michaelson (Angell Conwell).
June 13–16, 2014	Jenna Kieran-Rayburn	Stephanie Lemelin	Jenna appears as the ex-wife of Stitch Rayburn (Sean Carrigan), who had taken their son Max and moved to Australia. She is contacted by Billy Abbott (David Tom) and Chelsea Lawson (Melissa Claire Egan), who were attempting to discover a secret Stitch was keeping. She caught on to their scam before she could reveal any valuable information. On January 6, 2016, it is revealed that Jenna had died in a car accident.
August 14–15, 2014	Helen Copeland	Karina Logue	Helen appears as the mother of Mariah Copeland (Camryn Grimes), contacted by Nicholas Newman (Joshua Morrow). She is reluctant to reveal information about her or Mariah, but Nick later overhears Helen telling Ian Ward (Ray Wise) that Nick has no idea who Mariah truly is.
