= Tyler Michaelson =

- The Young and the Restless character
- Portrayed by: Redaric Williams
- Duration: 2012–2014
- First appearance: December 17, 2012
- Last appearance: September 30, 2014
- Created by: Josh Griffith
- Introduced by: Jill Farren Phelps
In-universe information
- Other names: Davis Rogan
- Occupation: Graphic designer; Marketing director at Jabot Cosmetics
- Father: Gus Rogan
- Mother: Belinda Rogan
- Sisters: Leslie Michaelson

Tyler Michaelson is a fictional character from the American CBS soap opera The Young and the Restless. Created by head writer Josh Griffith, the role is portrayed by international model Redaric Williams. Executive producer Jill Farren Phelps introduced him during the episode that aired on December 17, 2012, as the younger brother of lawyer Leslie Michaelson (Angell Conwell). Tyler's storyline saw him become a potential threat to the marriage of Lily and Cane Ashby (Christel Khalil and Daniel Goddard). However, a story arc about Tyler and Leslie's past occurs, revealing that their father Gus Rogan (Tony Todd) was wrongly convicted for the murder of their mother, Belinda, and they changed their names, originally being Davis and Valerie.

== Casting ==
"With Redaric and Lamon [Archey], we were really looking for that void that has never quite been filled with the departure of Shemar Moore as Malcolm. When Shemar left the show, there was that opening that was never properly been filled. We really were looking for a very specific man to fill those big shoes, and we found two of them! So we had an extensive audition process. We went through seeing a lot of gentlemen and very talented guys. When we saw both Redaric and Lamon, we thought right away that we needed to have these two guys on Y&R, and we are so happy to have them. So yes, we were looking to fill one role and this may be the first time that they may be hearing this!"

— Angelica McDaniel on Williams' casting (2012)

In August 2012, with the installation of new executive producer Jill Farren Phelps and head writer Josh Griffith, The Young and the Restless released a casting call for the contract role of "Tyler Douglas". A casting call released for the role of Lily led to speculation that the producers were recasting the role of Lily's brother, Devon Hamilton, portrayed by Bryton James. However, Phelps later confirmed that Tyler was a new character. Williams' audition tape would later surface revealing some very crucial information about the character. Initially, Tyler "Douglas" was to be introduced as the nephew of Sarge Wilder (Darnell Williams) and interacts with Lily when he starts working at Jabot Cosmetics. Later, Griffith stated that the character's familial relationship to Sarge was subject to change. After much speculation, Soap Opera Digest later revealed that the character would be the younger brother of Leslie Michaelson. In October, it was confirmed that Williams had been cast in the role; he taped his first scenes during the week of November 5, and was scheduled to begin airing on December 12. According to legendary casting director Judy Blye Wilson, despite Williams being very well known as a model, he was not on the soap opera's radar. Williams' manager heard about the casting call and had the actor upload his audition tape to his personal YouTube channel so Wilson could see it. Williams later revealed that after sending in his audition tape, he was contacted by the series to screen test with Khalil and Goddard. Williams made his first onscreen appearance on December 17, 2012. After a short time on a recurring status, Williams was placed on contract. He stated that he had "mixed emotions" of signing a contract, saying that he was "a little concerned" about being "locked in for years", but added: "On the other hand, knowing how this industry is, it felt good to have job security." Williams was taken off contract in 2014, and was last seen on September 30.

== Development ==
=== Characterization ===
"His versatility. I've done work in the past where you show up to film and it's not a prolonged thing. This is a journey. This is a character that's going to unfold and it's going to be a while. The fact that he is a versatile individual, without one set way, that's what I like. He's somebody that's playful, but then he can also be an aggressor and as I said, he's very capable of handling himself in this new corporate situation. He's polished, but he came from the other side of the tracks, so he has that side as well. He can go anywhere."

— Williams on what excites him about Tyler (2012)

The initial casting call described Tyler's age as being in his late 20s or early 30s. Tyler becomes an orphan at the age of 16 and works his way through college to get an MBA. Williams said that, "He's driven to succeed. Smart, energetic. Well-read. Smoothly sexy and confident, with a witty, sometimes cynical sense of humor." In an interview with Soap Opera Digest, Williams described the character as being a confident, well-rounded, and ambitious, "street-smart guy", with intelligence. However, the character is also very impatient. Tyler is "Quick to draw, quick to shoot," with a marketing and design background that makes him very appealing to the corporate raiders of Genoa City. According to Williams, Tyler at first may come off as a bad guy, and compared him to "a bull in a china shop". Williams described Tyler "as not your typical schooled cookie-cutter graphic designer. He is an artsy and urban art guy." CBS Daytime's senior vice-president, Angelica McDaniel, described the character as a "young and hip" artist who understands the power of social media and marketing. Williams stated that Tyler has a "strong presence", and can be a "live wire". Tyler is "agenda driven, and he is not just there to cause trouble". Williams explained that what appealed to him the most was that Tyler's personality gave him a lot of freedom in his portrayal of the character. According to McDaniel, the character has many layers that will need to be explored. In an interview with Deanna Barnet of TV Buzz, Williams categorized Tyler as being a "social chameleon" and explained that Tyler is capable of adapting to any social setting. He stated: "He's kind of a square peg in a round hole." However, instead of adapting to his environment, he tries to change that environment. If met with disapproval, Tyler changes his approach. According to Williams, Tyler isn't easily shaken and he's "seasoned by life". According to Williams, Tyler is confident "because he knows he's competent". If Tyler feels that "he is coming off as cocky, which is often, then he will back off". Williams explained to Rolling Out magazine that Tyler's overconfident demeanor is his way of hiding his pain. Despite what may appear on the surface, Williams feels the character has a good heart. "He's developing, as a human being. He's coming of age. He's a man. And he's now in a new environment…"

=== Secret past ===
According to Williams, Leslie and Tyler are very comfortable with one another and have a very playful relationship. In an interview with Soaps In Depth, Williams compared Tyler and Leslie's relationship to his relationship with his real life sister, who is also a lawyer. Leslie is very patient with Tyler and has always "coddled him," according to Conwell. When Tyler must finally face his father, "[Leslie] feels she has to treat him like the little brother again."

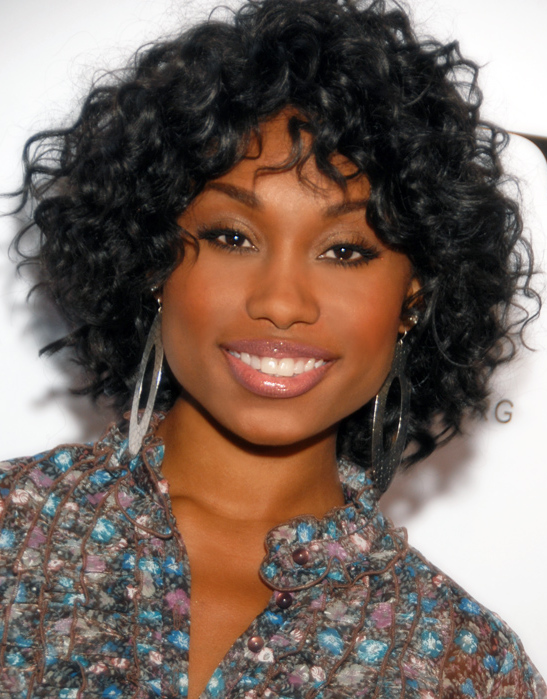
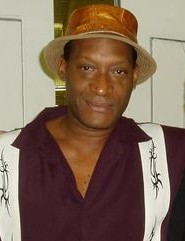
Angell Conwell (left) and Tony Todd (right) play Tyler's sister and father

In February 2013, Angelica McDaniel confirmed that several stories would climax during the celebration of the show's 40th anniversary, including the story about Tyler and Leslie's past; "[…] Tyler and Leslie have some sort of [secret] history that will come to fruition." In January 2013 when Mark Pinter joined the cast as Congressman Marcus Wheeler, an associate of popular characters, Victor Newman (Eric Braeden) and Jack Abbott (Peter Bergman), Tyler and Leslie's past is explored. While Leslie is terrified to see Wheeler, Tyler initially doesn't think it's a big deal. It is eventually revealed that Tyler and Leslie were born, Davis and Valerie Rogan. The teenagers change their names after Valerie is forced to testify against their father for killing their mother Belinda. Their father is convicted thanks to Valerie and Wheeler's testimonies. When Tyler learns that their father is trying to get an appeal, he wants to reveal his true identity and testify against him, but Leslie urges him not to as she questions their father's guilt. In late December 2012, veteran actor, Tony Todd, known for his starring role as the Candyman in the horror franchise confirmed that he had been cast in the role of Tyler and Leslie's incarcerated father, Gus Rogan. Soaps In Depth revealed that Gus's arrival would stir up trouble for his children. In the meantime, Tyler changes his tune about wanting to testify against his father as he is faced with the reality of Gus's release. With Gus's exoneration, Tyler cannot pretend everything is "OK" just because Gus did not kill their mother. According to Williams, "Tyler is being asked to be somebody else" and he's already gone through that. However, Tyler is pretty much fearless so he will have no choice but to "bite the bullet" and deal with his father. Tyler gets drunk and reminisces with a photo of himself and Leslie as children. According to Williams, "[Tyler]'s feeling like he's losing his sister." It is the first time Tyler and Leslie have not been in one another's corner, and him being estranged from his sister is such unfamiliar territory for him that he starts to lose it. For so long, Tyler thought Gus was responsible for Belinda's death and when all of that suddenly changes, "it's kind of a cool place to be in as an actor!" said Williams.

=== Romance ===
Williams revealed to TV Source that Tyler falling in love is "a stretch". Tyler views himself as being in a "tunnel" and "love is this little glimmer off in the distance". Though Tyler still looks for love, according to Williams, finding it would be anything but smooth. Tyler is in a constant state of metamorphosis: "What you see right now is not what you’re going to get."

"For Tyler, I think it will be either all or none... He's the kind of guy who would go into a casino and put all his chips on one table. He's chosen to open to Lily. He hasn't confided in anyone else. She's his co-worker, but he's attracted to her. If he goes forward, it will be all or nothing. He's either looking to be totally engulfed in this woman, and lay it on the line, or he will be 100 percent a friend. It could go either way."

— Williams on potential Tyler/Lily romance.

In December 2012, head writer, Josh Griffith revealed that Tyler would set his sights on Lily in the New Year. However, Tyler's initial interest in Lily seems to be just for kicks. He's new in town and has nothing to lose by flirting with Lily, even if she's married. However, Tyler does not expect his flirting to become something genuine, and he embraces that "realness" of his bond with Lily. According to Williams, Lily is "special". Lily sees beyond his hard exterior, and finds his vulnerability. When Tyler is honest about his past, Lily's comfort strikes a nerve with Cane. Tyler's intentions with Lily are not clear cut, which adds to the storyline's unpredictability. The genuine feelings leads to a kiss when Tyler is in need of comfort. When Tyler tries to walk away from Jabot for her, she confesses her feelings, and "things come to a head".

Tyler tries to cover up his feelings for Lily by dating other women including Quinn (Victoria Barabas) who serves as an outlet for Tyler when he is faced with his father's mortality. The writers soon began developing Tyler's relationship with Melissa Ordway's Abby Newman. According to Williams, Tyler is "intrigued" by Abby's unpredictable nature and said that their natural attraction could lead to romance. However, Williams hinted that Tyler's interest in Abby could be his attempt to "suppress his feelings" for Lily.

== Storylines ==
After Leslie sets up an impromptu job interview with her boss and Jabot Cosmetics CEO, Neil Winters (Kristoff St. John), Tyler is hired to help with marketing. Though Tyler has great ideas, his flirtatious behavior with Neil's daughter Lily doesn't sit well with her husband Cane. Tyler also gets a job marketing new night club The Underground. Tyler and Leslie's past unravels with the arrival of Marcus Wheeler (Mark Pinter). It is revealed that their father Gus (Tony Todd) who was convicted of their mother's murder is looking for an appeal. Upon Gus's release, Tyler has trouble adjusting, and he is shocked when Wheeler is arrested for his mother's murder instead. Just when Tyler lets his father in, Gus dies. In the meantime, Tyler bonds with Lily and begins to fall for her. After a kiss, Tyler sees she is overwhelmed and backs off. However, Tyler cannot deny his feelings and decides to quit his job; instead Lily agrees to work in another division. When Tyler and Devon butt heads over decisions for a campaign, Tyler accuses Neil of nepotism and ends up getting fired. Fortunately he finds another job based in New York that allows him to work from Wisconsin. Tyler befriends Noah Newman (Robert Adamson) and they get an apartment together. In addition, Tyler begins dating Noah's aunt, Abby (Melissa Ordway).

In the meantime, a mystery blogger begins targeting Lily's entire family even insinuating that Lily is jealous of Tyler and Abby's relationship. After Thanksgiving, Tyler thanks Lily for helping him find love in another person. Afterward, Tyler reveals to Abby that he was engaged to a woman named Mariah who keeps telephoning him. Abby becomes jealous and threatened when Tyler struggles to cut Mariah out of his life. The two travel to Los Angeles for Christmas, during which a mysterious woman goes into their hotel room. Abby believes the woman to be Mariah, which Tyler continuously denies.

== Reception ==
Jillian Bowe applauded the initial casting and praised the official casting announcement. Jamey Giddens praised Williams' audition tape and along with other critics applauded the writers for introducing Tyler as Leslie's brother, adding a new African American family to canvas. Entertainment Weekly said Williams's casting was reminiscent of the Shemar Moore casting in 1994 and said the Tyler character could help fans get past Moore's 2005 departure. Rolling Out Magazine said like Moore's Malcolm, "Tyler is that bad guy-good guy." Williams was "flattered" by the comparison but he did not agree with it. In November 2012, Sheryl Underwood of CBS Daytime's The Talk stated that Williams was worthy of People magazine's Sexiest Man Alive title and co-host Julie Chen Moonves even extended an invitation to Williams to appear on the talk show. On December 7, Williams appeared on The Talk along with costars Ignacio Serricchio, Lamon Archey and Marco Dapper to discuss their new roles. Williams who posted the video of his audition on his own personal YouTube channel was forced to take the video down when it attracted too much attention. We Loves Soaps named Williams as the "Sexiest Male" in Daytime for the year 2012. Y&R's casting director, Judy Blye Wilson described Williams as a "real natural" and applauded the actor for being able to make the transition from modeling to acting so easily. Williams's hiring also garnered the attention from other casting directors inquiring about where Wilson found him. Williams, along with several other high-profile castings helped Wilson win her 11th Artios Award from the Casting Society of America. In 2014, Williams was nominated for NAACP Image Award for Outstanding Actor in a Daytime Drama Series.

During a press conference for the show's 40th anniversary, CBS Daytime's senior vice-president Angelica McDaniel accredited Williams and the other new younger hires as complements to the already very talented cast. McDaniel included Williams as being part of the "next generation" that would help the show thrive in the future.

Tyler's potential romance with Lily received mixed reviews. Some embraced the potential pairing, while others were a bit cynical believing like past regimes, the new bosses would fold under the pressure of Lane (Cane and Lily)'s fans. Sara Bibel stated that the character had proven to be a formidable potential love interest for Lily and Jamey Giddens agreed describing Tyler as the more "palpable" threat to the couple compared Cane's sketchy past. However, majority of Soaps In Depth readers disagreed; according to a poll in the February 25, 2013 issue, 65% of fans said that Tyler would not be able to come between Cane and Lily. Meanwhile, some fans questioned the writers' motives. Other viewers believed Lily falling for Tyler would make her look naive, while some believed Tyler would run away from Lily because she was a mother, with others concluding that Tyler was not Lily's type. Soaps In Depth described Lily and Tyler getting stuck in the elevator as unrealistic because neither used a cellphone and said the scene "came across as very unnatural to the viewer!"

Viewers and critics also praised the plot centered around Leslie and Tyler's secret past. Sara Bibel said it made her care about Tyler (and Leslie) as a family. Bibel appreciated that the characters were not being isolated, like the African American characters of the past had been. Tyler and Leslie were also listed at No. 3 in the "5 Things We're Loving" section. "Leslie and Tyler are as sexy as their hush-hush past is intriguing" said the article. Sara Bibel later commented that Tyler and Leslie's visit with a falsely accused and incarcerated Gus was one of the highlights during the week of Y&R's anniversary.
