= Leslie Michaelson =

Fictional character from the American CBS soap opera The Young and the Restless

- The Young and the Restless character
- Portrayed by: Angell Conwell
- Duration: 2010–2017; 2019
- First appearance: December 2, 2010
- Last appearance: April 25, 2019
- Created by: Maria Arena Bell, Hogan Sheffer and Scott Hamner
- Introduced by: Maria Arena Bell and Paul Rauch; Anthony Morina and Josh Griffith (2019)
In-universe information
- Other names: Valerie Rogan; Leslie Shelby
- Occupation: Attorney; Legal Counsel at Jabot Cosmetics
- Father: Gus Rogan
- Mother: Belinda Rogan
- Brothers: Tyler Michaelson
- Husband: Barton Shelby (2014–)

Leslie Michaelson is a fictional character from the American CBS soap opera The Young and the Restless. Created and introduced by former head writer Maria Arena Bell, the role is portrayed by Angell Conwell, who made her first appearance on the episode that aired on December 2, 2010. Bell introduced Leslie as a high-powered attorney who would air on a recurring status. In December 2012, after two years on recurring, Conwell was placed on contract by executive producer Jill Farren Phelps however, was dropped back to recurring in August 2014, appearing until June 2017. Conwell made a guest appearance on April 25, 2019, to honour Kristoff St. John's character Neil Winters passing, as well as the actor's real life death.

Conwell described the character as "sharp as a tack" and "self-assured". Redaric Williams was later introduced as Leslie's younger brother Tyler Michaelson, and a story arc about their past occurs, revealing that their father Gus Rogan (Tony Todd) was wrongly convicted for the murder of their mother, Belinda, and they changed their names, originally being Valerie and Davis. Conwell's portrayal has garnered praise among critics and viewers; she is described as a "scene stealer", and has earned an NAACP Image Award nomination for her portrayal of Leslie.

== Casting and portrayal ==
Conwell first appeared in the role of Leslie Michaelson on December 2, 2010, introduced by the soap opera's former executive producer and head writer Maria Arena Bell on a recurring status. Conwell auditioned for the role because her "entire family watches the show", she explained "the character was one that I really wanted to play. When I went to the audition, I just really felt it and I think it came off in the audition. I really enjoy working with the cast. They are such great actors which I don’t think a lot of people realize. The whole experience has been just great". Conwell prepared for the role by researching characteristics of lawyers. Additionally, she said, "I also watched a lot of movies where actors or actresses I admire played lawyers. I then added my own spin on it which I think is very important. I had been a fan of the show, so I had an idea of the role. But thank goodness for the internet." Conwell said that she enjoys playing Leslie, a role which signifies "growth" for her career. In December 2012, after two years on recurring, Conwell was placed on contract by Bell's successor, Jill Farren Phelps however, was dropped back to recurring in August 2014.

In March 2015, Soap Opera Digest announced that Conwell would reprise the role of Leslie, which she did on the episode airing March 24.

Conwell made her last appearance as Leslie on June 22, 2017, but returned in April 2019 in a brief guest appearance for the death of Kristoff St. John and his character Neil Winters.

== Development ==
=== Characterization ===
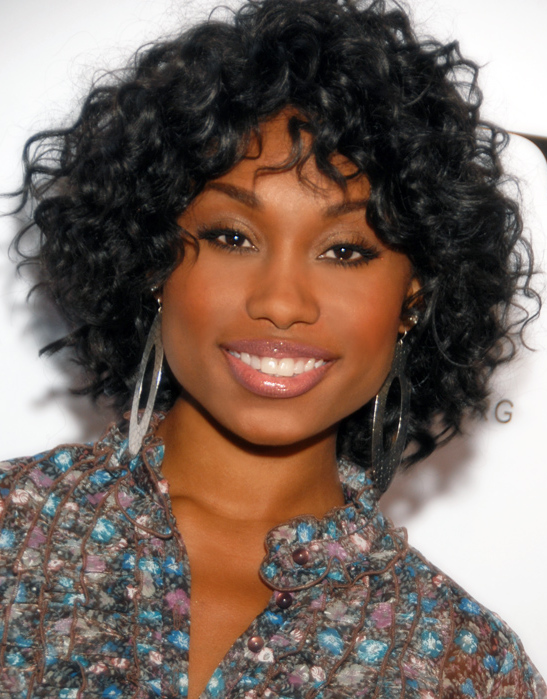
Angell Conwell said Leslie is always busy and finds different angles through her legal work.

The show's official website describes Leslie as a "skilled attorney". She is a lawyer at Vance Abram's law firm. Conwell stated: "She's sharp as a tack and self-assured." Of Leslie's on and off storyline, Conwell said: "With my character being a lawyer there always seems to be something going on in the city so Leslie is out there tending to her business". She explained that Leslie loves what she does, and "finds different angles" in cases which she can focus on. When Leslie first arrived, she became a "one-time" love interest for long-running character Neil Winters (Kristoff St. John). The couple didn't last long. Conwell said that when Leslie and Neil first hooked up, they went "in for the kill" and moved fast, but she wasn't sure whether the romance would be revisited.

Conwell talked to Zap2it about Leslie's romance with Neil, stating "hopefully we'll be working together more. I think they have good energy." They have since began to inch closer and he gave her a job offer for Jabot Cosmetics. Luke Kerr from Daytime Confidential recapped the storyline, "At Jabot, Leslie told Neil she couldn’t accept his job offerbecause she was thinking about him as a man. She told him it would be inappropriate for them to end up in a relationship if they were working together. Neil finally convinced her that if they had an overwhelming urge to date, he would fire her. Leslie accepted the job." In December 2012, Redaric Williams was introduced to the series as her brother Tyler Michaelson, Leslie's first family member to appear on the soap opera. Williams told Soap Opera Digest that although Tyler is "impatient", he gets along with his sister "really well" and they are "very comfortable with each other".

=== Secret past ===
In February 2013, Angelica McDaniel confirmed that several stories would climax during the celebration of the show's 40th anniversary, including the story about Tyler and Leslie's past; "[…] Tyler and have some sort of [secret] history that will come to fruition." It is eventually revealed that Tyler and Leslie were born, Davis and Valerie Rogan. The teenagers changed their names after Valerie is forced to testify against their father for killing their mother in 2001. Their father in convicted thanks to Valerie and Wheeler's testimonies. In late December 2012, veteran actor, Tony Todd, known for his starring role as the Candyman in the horror franchise confirmed that he had been cast in the role of Tyler and Leslie's incarcerated father, Gus Rogan. Soaps In Depth revealed that Gus's arrival would stir up trouble for his children. Later it was revealed Gus was in fact wrongly convicted of murdering his wife. It was later proved via DNA evidence that Congressmen Marcus Wheeler (Mark Pinter), the man Belinda Rogan had an affair with while she was working on his political campaign, had murdered her.

== Storylines ==
Leslie appears on the canvas as an attorney who works at a legal firm owned by Vance Abrams (Eric Roberts). Having previously experienced success as a lawyer in Hollywood, she represents Adam (Michael Muhney) and Sharon Newman (Sharon Case) when they are both wrongly convicted for the murder of his ex-wife Skye Newman (Laura Stone). Adam is freed and soon Sharon is blamed for the murder after witnessing Skye's death (after she fell in a volcano). Sharon skips town after being sentenced to life in prison, and leaves everyone believing she died. Leslie briefly resumes her position as her lawyer once she is found and brought back to Genoa City, but is replaced by Avery Bailey Clark (Jessica Collins).

Leslie represents Abby Newman (Marcy Rylan) and Victoria Abbott (Amelia Heinle) in their lawsuit against their father, Victor Newman (Eric Braeden). Eventually, their brother Nicholas Newman (Joshua Morrow) joins the lawsuit. Under Leslie's representation, the Newman children win the lawsuit, winning $500 million each. Leslie begins having an on-and-off romance with Jabot Cosmetics executive Neil Winters (Kristoff St. John), which neither take too seriously. She represents Phyllis Summers (Michelle Stafford) twice; once during a custody battle for Phyllis' granddaughter Lucy, and a second time when she was put on trial for attempted murder.

Leslie reconnects with Neil and is hired as the legal council at Jabot Cosmetics by him. They attempt to keep their relationship professional, but struggle doing so. Leslie fantasies about Neil but refuses to become involved with him. Later, however, she shows up at his apartment and they make love. Leslie is reunited with her brother Tyler Michaelson (Redaric Williams), a business marketer. Tyler hits on Neil's daughter Lily Ashby (Christel Khalil) who is married to Cane Ashby (Daniel Goddard). It is revealed that Leslie and Tyler are hiding a secret about their past. Marcus Wheeler (Mark Pinter) later recognizes Leslie, calling her "Valerie". It is later revealed that Leslie, Tyler and Wheeler testified against Gus Rogan (Tony Todd), Leslie and Tyler's father who was believed to have killed their mother and his wife, Belinda Rogan, who was having an affair. Leslie and Tyler's real names were Valerie and Davis Rogan, and after Gus was sentenced to life in prison, they changed their names. Wheeler is suspected to have been somehow involved with Belinda's murder, and Avery Bailey Clark (Jessica Collins) finds DNA evidence pointing to Wheeler. Gus is released and Wheeler is arrested, and convicted of murdering Belinda.

Leslie and Tyler both struggle to reconnect with Gus, even after he moves in with Leslie. She later finds a box of Gus' which he asked her not to look in, but disobeys her father's wishes and finds letters from a mystery women named Rose Turner. Gus then suffers a heart attack and dies, unable to tell Leslie who Rose was. Afterward, Avery asks Leslie to become her partner in a law firm together, which she accepts. After Gus' death, Leslie looks into who Rose was, and finds out that she supposedly died in 2007, and has a daughter, Anne, who lives in Europe. She also realizes that Gus was unaware of her death, leading to more confusion.

Leslie last appeared to assist Juliet Helton, in her lawsuit she filed against Brash and Sassy in mid 2017.

== Reception ==
The character has been met with a positive response. Jamey Giddens of Zap2it commended Conwell's casting in the role, writing: "Praise the Lord, and pass the diversity." Giddens later wrote that "Genoa City received an additional helping of sexual chocolate" in the form of Conwell, adding: "As take-no-prisoners barrister Leslie Michaelson on The Young and the Restless, Conwell has gone up against some of the most powerful performers on daytime's top soap, and from where we're watching, she's definitely held her own." Giddens later lauded the romance storyline between Neil and Leslie, "For the first time since Victoria Rowell decided to exit the serial, Y&R is telling a sexy, intriguing, multi-ethnic tale, featuring the talented St. John. In Conwell, Y&R has finally found a post-Dru leading lady worthy of being by Neil's side during the next phase of his soap operatic life." Conwell has been described as a "scene stealer", and in December 2012 received an NAACP Image Award for Outstanding Actress in a Daytime Drama Series nomination of her portrayal of Leslie.
