= List of The Young and the Restless characters introduced in 2013 =

The Young and the Restless is an American television soap opera. It was first broadcast on March 26, 1973, and airs on CBS. The following is a list of characters that first appeared on the soap opera in 2013, by order of first appearance. All characters through October were introduced by executive producer Jill Farren Phelps and head writer Josh Griffith; characters after October were introduced by Phelps and head writers Shelly Altman and Jean Passanante.

== Adriana Stone ==
Adriana Stone
- The Young and the Restless character
- Portrayed by: Jhoanna Flores
- Duration: 2013
- First appearance: January 7, 2013
- Last appearance: April 9, 2013
- Created by: Josh Griffith
- Introduced by: Jill Farren Phelps
In-universe information
- Brothers: Alex Chavez

Adriana Stone, portrayed by Jhoanna Flores, made her first appearance on January 7, 2013. The news of her casting was confirmed in December 2012 by co-star Robert Adamson, who portrays Noah Newman, on Twitter. He welcomed her to the soap opera, saying that he'll "keep it under wraps for now who she’s playing. But she’s doing a great job." CBS Soaps In Depth later announced that Flores would portray Noah's ex-girlfriend, Adriana. Previously, Soap Opera Network's Errol Lewis reported that Flores "has joined the cast in an as yet to be determined role." Flores described her character in an interview, saying "she's bad news" and a "feisty seductress who has her own ideas about what is legal and what isn't." According to the actress, "[Adriana]'s fun to play and I think her relationship with Noah will excite the viewers." In April 2013, within four months of joining the cast, it was announced that Flores had been let go, and had already made her last appearance on April 9. A spokesperson from the soap opera confirmed that the role would not be recast.

Adriana showed up at Noah's doorstep and threw herself at him, despite the fact that she had cheated on him for someone else. However, she made it clear that she still had feelings for him. She learned that the half a million dollars in cash she sent him has been stolen. Later, Alex Chavez (Ignacio Serricchio), a New York detective who had been hassling Noah with questions about Adriana and the stolen money for months, finds Adriana at the Genoa City Athletic Club and confronts her. She denies knowing anything about the money. In reality, Chloe Mitchell (Elizabeth Hendrickson) and Kevin Fisher (Greg Rikaart) had stolen the stolen money from Noah's house. Alex and Adriana are then revealed to be siblings. After the stolen money mishap is resolved, Adriana is hired by Katherine Chancellor (Jeanne Cooper) as her personal assistant and restarts her relationship with Noah. However, Jill Abbott Fenmore (Jess Walton) believes Adriana is scamming Katherine, and later accuses her of stealing a piece of her jewelry. As a result, Adriana quits working for Katherine. She and Noah begin to discuss moving in together, but she abruptly disappears from Genoa City. Alex later mentions that Adriana is known to run away from serious relationships.

== Marcus Wheeler ==
Marcus Wheeler
- The Young and the Restless character
- Portrayed by: Mark Pinter
- Duration: 2013
- First appearance: January 10, 2013
- Last appearance: April 12, 2013
- Created by: Josh Griffith
- Introduced by: Jill Farren Phelps
In-universe information
- Occupation: Congressman
- Wife: Ann Wheeler (divorced)
- Daughters: Stephanie Gayle

Congressman Marcus Wheeler, portrayed by Mark Pinter, first appeared on January 10, 2013. Marcus, penned as "a powerful and sophisticated congressman who will go to any lengths to protect his image and career" and "another ruthless politico", would get into business with rivaling business tycoons Jack Abbott (Peter Bergman) and Victor Newman (Eric Braeden). Pinter was previously famed for portraying "slimy senator-turned-mayor" Grant Harrison on the soap opera Another World. Pinter, described by On-Air On-Soaps as playing "slimy bad guy so good that you want to throw something at the TV set", began taping scenes for the soap opera on December 6, 2012. Jillian Bowe of Zap2it called the casting "juicy" and confirmed that Pinter would remain on the show beyond February sweeps. Jill Farren Phelps, executive producer of the soap opera, was responsible for Pinter's hiring on both Another World and General Hospital. It was later announced that Pinter had finished his four-month stint as the character, with his last airdate scheduled for April 12, 2013. Speaking of Phelps hiring him Pinter told Soap Opera Digest that "You get jobs generally because of where you've been and if you're a director or producer, you want to work with people you've worked with before. I'm very appreciative of Jill. She's a woman who has a great allegiance to people and I don't know anybody who has worked with Jill who doesn't have great allegiance to her as well."

In January 2013, Jack Abbott wakes up in his mansion to find a woman named Stephanie Gayle dead in his living room. His colleague Adam Newman (Michael Muhney) helps him realize that Stephanie, a hooker, was hired by Victor Newman to be with Jack so that she would be seen walking out of his house. Victor was scheming to get back his company, Newman Enterprises, which Jack took over. Adam disposes of the body, and Victor later investigates and finds out that Stephanie is Stephanie Wheeler, daughter of Congressman Marcus Wheeler. Stephanie died due to overdosing on pills. Victor becomes very concerned, as Marcus is a very powerful man. Wheeler is later revealed to have had an affair with Belinda Rogan, the mother of Leslie and Tyler Michaelson (Angell Conwell and Redaric Williams), who was believed to be murdered by her husband, Gus, as he was convicted for the crime. Victor kept looking to Wheeler's affairs and when he refused to stop, he hired an assassin named Bob to plant a bomb at the Newman ranch while Victor was remarrying Nikki Newman (Melody Thomas Scott). The bomb was defused but Adam was shot, leading Victor to much suspicion that Wheeler was behind the incident. Afterward, evidence surfaced that Wheeler was in fact the one who murdered Belinda and Gus was set free. Wheeler made bail, but Bob later turned on his employer and revealed that Wheeler was the one who hired him to bomb the Newman ranch. He was arrested and sent to prison.

== Gus Rogan ==
Gus Rogan
- The Young and the Restless character
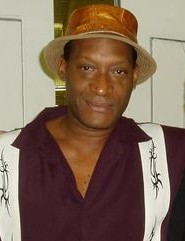
- Portrayed by: Tony Todd
- Duration: 2013
- First appearance: March 15, 2013
- Last appearance: May 7, 2013
- Created by: Josh Griffith
- Introduced by: Jill Farren Phelps
In-universe information
- Wife: Belinda Rogan (divorced)
- Sons: Tyler Michaelson
- Daughters: Leslie Michaelson

Gus Rogan, portrayed by veteran actor Tony Todd, made his first appearance on March 15, 2013. Todd had previously confirmed his casting in an interview on February 27. Gus is the estranged father of Leslie and Tyler Michaelson. The casting news went relatively unnoticed until Jillian Bowe of Zap2it linked Todd's interview with Horror Society. The initial casting call described Gus as a "small-time criminal after one of his own children testified against him." Todd stated that the role was something he just couldn't refuse. At the time, Todd had only filmed 4 of the 20 episodes he was originally expected to appear in. Later, Soaps In Depth reported that his run had been lengthened. Todd made his last appearance on May 7, 2013, upon the character's death. Following Todd's departure, Leslie Stevens was cast in the role of Rose Turner, the women from Gus's past who would also shed some light on the blogger targeting Leslie's boyfriend, Neil Winters (Kristoff St. John).

Gus is first mentioned as the incarcerated unnamed father of Leslie (Angell Conwell) and Tyler Michaelson (Redaric Williams). As of January 2013, Gus's case is taken on by the Innocence Foundation because he claims to have been falsely accused. Local attorney, Avery Bailey Clark (Jessica Collins) is assigned as Gus's attorney. Meanwhile, Congressman Marcus Wheeler (Mark Pinter) begins pressuring Tyler and Leslie about coming out of hiding and testifying against their father again to keep him in prison. Tyler and Leslie hate their father for killing their mother, Belinda, but Leslie is too terrified to come out of hiding. As Avery gets closer to getting Gus's conviction overturned, someone attempts to kill her and Leslie believes it is one of Gus's associates. However, thanks to Avery, Leslie begins to think Gus could be innocent. Later, DNA evidence turns up that reveals implicates Wheeler in Belinda's murder, exonerating Gus. He is released from prison and Leslie and Tyler attempt to repair their relationships with their father. Soon after, Gus suffers a heart attack and is hospitalized, while Leslie finds a box with Gus' possessions in it. She finds love letters written to him from a woman named Rose, and when Gus awakens she confronts him over them. He is later discharged from the hospital and returns to Leslie's apartment, where he reveals that Belinda knew about his affair with Rose. Moments later, Gus suffers another heart attack and is pronounced dead by paramedics. Gus is buried in Milwaukee next to Belinda.

== Courtney Sloane ==
Courtney Sloane
- The Young and the Restless character
- Portrayed by: Kelli Goss
- Duration: 2013–15
- First appearance: April 10, 2013
- Last appearance: August 12, 2015
- Created by: Josh Griffith
- Introduced by: Jill Farren Phelps
In-universe information
- Other names: Farrah
- Occupation: Police detective; Jabot Cosmetics Intern

Courtney Sloane, portrayed by Kelli Goss, made her first appearance on April 10, 2013, as the best friend of Summer Newman (Hunter King). Speculation had first arose in September 2012 that Goss could be up for the role of Summer, but the role was given to King. Goss had previously appeared on Hollywood Heights as the friend of King's character. Rumors of Goss's casting circulated in March 2013; CBS Sports listed her as a cast member. The casting was later confirmed by Soap Opera Digest. The character has been well received by critics. In April 2015, the actress confirmed her departure from the series. Goss thanked the show for allowing her to portray a role for "the best two weeks that turned into two years." Goss last aired on April 6, 2015. Goss temporarily returned in newly created flashbacks on August 12, 2015.

Initially introduced as Summer's "co-conspirator and confidant", Courtney soon becomes the voice of reason when Summer's life begins falling apart. She gives Summer "level headed advice," and is willing to risk their friendship to make sure Summer is safe. Courtney even impresses Summer's aunt, Abby Newman (Melissa Ordway), during an interview, which leads to her getting an internship at Jabot Cosmetics. In addition, Courtney has a crush on Summer's brother, Noah Newman (Robert Adamson), which eventually develops into a romance. Though it seems Courtney and Noah's relationship is smooth sailing from the beginning, Goss admitted that Courtney is "treading lightly". Speaking of the character's relationship with Noah, the actress stated: "She is an 18-year-old who is freaking out inside." Soap Opera Digest was unfavorable of the series' decision to kill Courtney off, writing: "True, she was a peripheral character but so was Sharon until she married Nick almost 20 years ago (...) The same potential could have been realized for Ms Sloane, a smart and compassionate cop". The magazine also said that Courtney "didn't get the airtime she deserved".

Courtney is Summer's close friend from high school. She helps Summer sneak into a bar by providing her with fake identification so she can impress Kyle Abbott (Hartley Sawyer). Courtney has a crush on Summer's brother, Noah and when Summer runs away, Noah charms Courtney into giving up Summer's location. In September 2013, Noah invites Courtney to a concert and they begin dating. Soon after, Courtney is seen receiving strange text messages and phone calls. Fenmore Baldwin (Max Ehrich) later tells Summer that Courtney does drugs. Summer confronts her friend and asks her why she is so hesitant to share anything about her personal life; Courtney firmly denies that she does drugs. It is eventually revealed that Courtney is actually a cop, who was undercover as a high schooler.

In February 2015, she, along with Noah, Summer, Austin Travers, Kevin Fisher, Mariah Copeland, Fenmore Baldwin and Abby Newman, head to the Abbott cabin for a Valentine's Day celebration. After Fen slips a party drug into the punch bowl, everyone is put to sleep. Everyone wakes up and does not remember anything that happened, and soon discover that Austin is nowhere to be seen. Courtney opens a closet in the cabin, only to find Austin's corpse. She declares him dead immediately, and realizes that he was in fact murdered, having his head smashed in with a bookend. Soon after, herself, along with the rest of the young crowd at the cabin, come up with a plan to cover up the murder, which goes against her duty as a cop. Two months later, Noah proposes to Courtney in Crimson Lights, saying that after all the events that happened to Summer and Austin, he does not want to live a second without her by his side. Courtney happily accepts, and the pair plan their wedding for the following day. After telling the group to meet her at the Abbott cabin, Courtney is found dead in a closet.

== Melanie Daniels ==
Melanie Daniels, portrayed by Erin Chambers, appeared from June 6 to August 26, 2013. Her casting in the role was announced in April, slated to be a paralegal who interacts with the Newman family. In an interview with Soaps In Depth, Chambers compared Melanie to her previous role, Siobhan McKenna on ABC's General Hospital, stating that the differences between the two characters go "beyond hair color and vocal inflection". She stated: "Melanie's a professional. She's very ambitious. Siobhan was more of a wanderer. She didn't know what she wanted. Melanie is very sure, driven and ambitious." Soaps In Depth also said of Chambers' character, "And seeing how so many characters on Y&R are often in trouble with the law, she should be kept pretty busy, even though the role is currently only recurring." Zap2it told viewers to look for "paralegal Melanie to mix it up with the always-in-need-of-legal-assistance Newman clan". The character and her storyline were critically panned. Upon news of her departure, Jillian Bowe of Zap2it remarked that "prayers have been answered".

Melanie first appears in June 2013 as a paralegal, hired by Avery Bailey Clark (Jessica Collins), to work with Adam and Victor Newman (Michael Muhney and Eric Braeden) at Newman Enterprises. Melanie began to pursue Adam romantically, however, in reality, Victor had ordered her to do so in order to spy on Adam and his business deals. When Adam discovered what Melanie was doing, he agreed to pay her extra to feed Victor false information. Victor saw through Melanie's lies and fired her, followed by Adam ending their romantic affair, despite her saying that she had begun to have genuine feelings for him. Melanie then decides to sue Adam for sexual harassment. Her decision generates much bad publicity for Adam and Newman Enterprises. Before the case can go to court, Adam's ex-wife Chelsea Lawson (Melissa Claire Egan) convinces Melanie that Adam is not worth the lawsuit; she then drops the charges and disappears from Genoa City.

== Stitch Rayburn ==
Stitch Rayburn
- The Young and the Restless character
- Portrayed by: Sean Carrigan
- Duration: 2013–2017; 2021
- First appearance: June 28, 2013
- Last appearance: August 30, 2021
- Created by: Josh Griffith
- Introduced by: Jill Farren Phelps (2013); Anthony Morina and Josh Griffith (2021)
In-universe information
- Other names: Benjamin Russell; Benjamin Rayburn
- Occupation: Physician; Chemist
- Parents: Richard Russell; Maureen Russell
- Siblings: Kelly Andrews
- Spouse: Jenna Kieran (divorced); Abby Newman (2015–2016)
- Children: Max Rayburn

Stitch Rayburn portrayed by Sean Carrigan, made his first appearance on June 28, 2013. His casting in the recurring role was announced in May; he was slated to be an "old army buddy" of Dylan McAvoy (Steve Burton). Errol Lewis of Soap Opera Network wrote that the soap opera was "gaining another strong army man". In November, it was announced that Carrigan had been put on contract with the series. In January 2017, Carrigan was bumped back to recurring status, and eventually exited the role. In June 2021, it was announced he would reprise the role of Ben. He returned on June 25 and departed on August 30 of that year.

Stitch arrives in Genoa City in June 2013 to visit his friend Dylan McAvoy (Steve Burton). Stitch is a doctor and was a part of Dylan's troop when they were in Afghanistan; they were the only two to survive as Stitch had returned home on leave. He is later Dylan's best man when he marries Chelsea Lawson (Melissa Claire Egan), and returns months later to comfort his friend after it is revealed that the child Chelsea was carrying was never Dylan's. Stitch announces he has taken a job at Genoa City Memorial Hospital and moves to town. Stitch then begins to grow close with Victoria Newman (Amelia Heinle), who was having marital problems with Billy Abbott (David Tom) and at the same time, is revealed to know Kelly Andrews (Cynthia Watros) and that he is hiding something about his past; to the point of her calling him a "murderer". Stitch and his wife Jenna then are said to be divorcing and she takes full custody of their son, Max, and moves to Melbourne, Australia, upsetting Stitch. Victoria and Billy separate and she wants to pursue a relationship with him, and they later sleep together. Soon after, Victoria learns she is pregnant but is unsure whether the child is Stitch's or Billy's. Billy ends up being the father of the child.

In 2015, Stitch marries Victoria's half-sister Abby Newman (Melissa Ordway) and they were expecting a baby until Abby miscarried.

== Rose Turner ==
Rose Turner
- The Young and the Restless character
- Portrayed by: Leslie Stevens
- Duration: 2013
- First appearance: July 25, 2013
- Last appearance: August 8, 2013
- Created by: Josh Griffith
- Introduced by: Jill Farren Phelps
In-universe information
- Family: Ames Family
- Adoptive daughters: Hilary Curtis
- First cousins: Naya Benedict
- Other relatives: Hilary Curtis; Amanda Sinclair; Imani Benedict

Rose Turner, portrayed by Leslie Stevens, appeared from July 25 to August 8, 2013. Her casting was announced in June; Soaps In Depth wrote of the character: "The mystery woman involved with Leslie and Tyler's dad, Gus and who just may hold the answer to the mystery regarding the online blogger targeting Neil." Kambra Clifford of Soap Opera Network wrote: "Fans have been chomping at the bit for more information regarding The Young and the Restless Rose, the mystery woman that Leslie (Angell Conwell) and Tyler’s (Redaric Williams) dad, Gus (Tony Todd), has been dating. Well good news: One more piece of the puzzle has been revealed!" She also told viewers to "watch the craziness begin to unfold when the actress first airs".

Rose was first mentioned when her letters to Gus Rogan (Tony Todd) were found; his daughter Leslie Michaelson (Angell Conwell) was unable to ask for the truth as Gus died soon after. Leslie continued to look into who Rose was, and found out she died in April 2007 and Gus was unaware of her death. Rose then appeared in several flashbacks to Leslie's boyfriend Neil Winters (Kristoff St. John), revealing that he met her in a bar in Evanston. They got drunk and later went to a hotel room, where Rose passed out. Neil left a "do not disturb" sign on the door and left, assuming she would sleep it off. However, Rose in fact died that night, and her daughter Ann Turner is posing as Hilary Curtis (Mishael Morgan) and targeting the Winters family as she blames Neil for her mother's death.

== Connor Newman ==
Connor Newman
- The Young and the Restless character
- Portrayed by: Brady and Cooper Friedman (2013); Nolan and Michael Webb (2013–2014); Owen and Henry Leark (2014–2015); Asher and Brayden McDonell (2015); Gunner and Ryder Gadbois (2015–2018); Judah Mackey (2019–present)
- Duration: 2013–present
- First appearance: August 12, 2013
- Created by: Josh Griffith
- Introduced by: Jill Farren Phelps (2013); Anthony Morina and Josh Griffith (2019)
In-universe information
- Other names: Connor Adam Newman; Terrence Connor McAvoy II
- Family: Newman
- Father: Adam Newman
- Mother: Chelsea Lawson
- Adoptive father: Calvin Boudreau
- Half-brothers: Johnny Abbott; Christian Newman
- Grandfathers: Victor Newman; Jeffrey Bardwell
- Grandmothers: Hope Wilson; Anita Lawson
- Uncles: Nicholas Newman
- Aunts: Victoria Newman; Abby Newman
- First cousins: Claire Grace; Cassie Newman (adoptive); Noah Newman; Summer Newman; Faith Newman; Reed Hellstrom; Johnny Abbott (adoptive); Katie Newman; Dominic Abbott Newman Chancellor

Connor Newman was introduced on August 12, 2013, as the son of Adam (Justin Hartley) and Chelsea Newman (Melissa Claire Egan). He was formerly believed to be the son of Dylan McAvoy (Steve Burton).

Chelsea goes into labor just hours after marrying Dylan who delivers the child before mother and son are taken to the hospital. By the time of Connor's birth, Adam had given up on his belief that he is the child's father. However, Chelsea worried about Dylan asking questions. Connor is named after Dylan's late father, Terrence Connor McAvoy. Adam realizes he is Connor's father after he overhears Dylan tell Billy Abbott (Billy Miller) that Connor may have a genetic eye disorder - Retinitis Pigmentosa. After being examined by an eye specialist, it is determined that Connor suffers from Peters Anomaly, and requires an immediate cornea transplant to save his sight. After Delia Abbott is killed in a hit and run by Adam, her corneas are harvested and transplanted to Connor. The surgery is a success and Connor's eyesight is saved. In 2018, he leaves town with his mother, however, returns in 2019.

== Others ==
Date(s)	Character	Actor	Information
January 1–11, 2013	Stephanie Gayle	Anne Leighton	Stephanie first appears as a prostitute hired by Victor Newman (Eric Braeden) to seduce Jack Abbott (Peter Bergman) on New Year's Eve. Stephanie and Jack share a kiss at midnight and she accompanies him back to his mansion. The pill popping Jack wakes up to find Stephanie dead on his living room floor. With assistance from Victor's son, Adam Newman (Michael Muhney), Stephanie's body ends up in an ally An autopsy report reveals she died from a combination of ecstasy and alcohol. Stephanie turns out to be the daughter of congressman, Marcus Wheeler (Mark Pinter) and his wife, Anne. Though Jack eventually confesses, Marcus decides against pressing charges to avoid scandal.
March 5–11, 2013	Terry McAvoy	Steve Gagnon	Terrence Connor "Terry" McAvoy is the widowed father of Dylan McAvoy (Steve Burton). Terry and his wife, initially raise Dylan in Darien, Connecticut and the family later relocates to Chicago. Terry starts his own construction company; but when Dylan is in college, Terry falls off a ladder and breaks his back forcing Dylan to drop out of college and run the business. Terry is expected to never walk again, but he eventually regains use of his limbs. However, an infection during a surgery leads to a decline in Terry's health forcing him to live with an around the clock nurse. Terry passes away on March 11, 2013, in Genoa City.
April 17–19, 2013	Barry	Bruce Weitz	Barry first appeared at the local restaurant, The Boulevard, recognizing Billy Abbott (Billy Miller) from his gambling days. He offered Billy a game of poker and while he initially refused, some other men at the restaurant joined in and so he changed his mind. Barry was in fact the owner of The Boulevard and Billy ended up winning ownership of the restaurant in the poker game.
April 26–29, 2013	Quinn	Victoria Barabas	Quinn appeared as a woman who Tyler Michaelson (Redaric Williams) met at a bar, and they later spent the night together.
May 2–October 23, 2013	Sheryl Gordon	Shi Ne Nielson	Detective Sheryl Gordon debuted as the partner of Detective Alex Chavez (Ignacio Serricchio). Abby Newman (Melissa Ordway), who was dating Alex at the time, was jealous of their close relationship.
May 17–22, 2013	Madame Miranda	Ann Magnuson	Madame Miranda is a psychic first appearing at a carnival while Chelsea Lawson (Melissa Claire Egan) and Chloe Mitchell (Elizabeth Hendrickson) are visiting. It is later revealed that Adam Newman (Michael Muhney) hired her to get information on the paternity of Chelsea's baby.
May 17–20, 2013	Angie	Jona Xiao	Angie first appears as a close friend of Summer Newman (Hunter King) at a prom party thrown by the latter. She dares Fenmore Baldwin (Max Ehrich) to kiss Summer, resulting in Kyle Abbott (Hartley Sawyer) punching Fen, upon realizing he has feelings for Summer.
June 10, 2013 – January 17, 2014	Raven	Amanda Leighton	Raven first appears as a classmate of Fenmore Baldwin (Max Ehrich), who invites him to a graduation party, where they do drugs and talk about their social struggles. She has since been established as a drug dealer, providing Fen and Courtney Sloane (Kelli Goss) with drugs when they want them.
November 8, 2013–February 19, 2014	Richard Womack	Myk Watford	Womack first appears as a fellow prison inmate to Fenmore Baldwin (Max Ehrich). After Fen's father and former district attorney Michael Baldwin (Christian LeBlanc) is released from prison, Fen can no longer be protected from the other inmates' beatings. Womack gets them to back off before Fen is released, and promises him that Fen can pay him back from the outside. Michael and Fen's mother Lauren Fenmore (Tracey E. Bregman) later receive a cake with the words "Forget Me Not" written in icing, leading Fen to suspect Womack sent it. When Fen is sent back to prison, Womack continues to harass Fen. He robs the Valentine's Day Gala shortly after his prison release, and is shot dead by Colin Atkinson (Tristan Rogers) during a struggle.
December 12, 2013–May 29, 2014	Esmeralda	Briana Nicole Henry	Esmeralda, a longtime model, interacts with Summer Newman (Hunter King) at a Jabot Cosmetics photo shoot, and afterward offers her the phone number of her drug dealer for energy pills. Esmeralda quickly comes forward when Summer ends up in the hospital from the pills and admits that she gave the energy pills to Summer. In 2014, Esmeralda hooks up with billionaire, Devon Hamilton (Bryton James) at the Valentine's Day gala. They later embark on a relationship, evidently for Devon to suppress his feelings for Hilary Curtis (Mishael Morgan). Devon keeps Esmeralda interested by buying her expensive things with his fortune. After being convinced that the relationship was going nowhere, Devon breaks up with her over the phone and she is not seen again afterward.
