= Lily Winters =

- The Young and the Restless character
- Christel Khalil as Lily Winters
- Portrayed by: Vanessa Carson (1996); Brooke Marie Bridges (1997–2000); Christel Khalil (2002–2005, 2006–present); Davetta Sherwood (2006)
- Duration: 1995–1998; 2000; 2002–present
- First appearance: June 26, 1995
- Created by: William J. Bell
- Introduced by: Edward J. Scott (1995, 2000); David Shaughnessy (2002); John F. Smith (2006); Lynn Marie Latham and Josh Griffith (2006); Michele Val Jean and Tracey Thomson (2026) (Note: In addition to Michele Val Jean and Tracey Thomson, other executive producers for Beyond the Gates include Sheila Ducksworth, Lela Coffey, Anna Saalfeld, Julie Hanan Carruthers, Leon W. Russell, and Derrick Johnson.)
- Crossover appearances: Beyond the Gates
- Davetta Sherwood as Lily Winters
In-universe information
- Other names: Lily Ashby; Lily Romalotti
- Occupation: Businessperson; Marketing director; Model; Freelance photographer; Hotel manager
- Parents: Malcolm Winters; Neil Winters (legal); Drucilla Winters
- Siblings: Holden Novak (half); Devon Hamilton (adoptive); Nate Hastings (adoptive); Moses Winters (legal)
- Spouse: Daniel Romalotti (2006–2007); Cane Ashby (2009–2011, 2012–2019)
- Children: Charlie Ashby; Mattie Ashby
- Grandparents: Walter Barber; Lillie Belle Barber; Lucinda Winters (legal)
- Aunts and uncles: Olivia Winters
- Nieces and nephews: Dominic Abbott Newman Winters Chancellor (adoptive)
- First cousins: Nate Hastings; Moses Winters

Lily Winters is a fictional character The Young and the Restless, an American soap opera on the CBS network. Created by William J. Bell, the character appeared as a child for her first five-year period. In 2002, Christel Khalil began portraying Lily as a teenager after the character rapidly aged. In 2005, Khalil left the series, resulting in the character's recasting with Davetta Sherwood; however, Sherwood's portrayal was brief when Khalil was asked to return the following year. Khalil began playing the character as a "rebellious, yet naive teenager", later becoming one of the soap opera's heroines.

Winters is the daughter of supermodel-turned-executive Drucilla Winters (Victoria Rowell) born in the midst of a questioned paternity storyline, with Neil Winters (Kristoff St. John) believing he was her father. Eleven years later, the storyline was readdressed with the revelation that Malcolm Winters (Shemar Moore) is her biological father. Lily later began a relationship with Daniel Romalotti (Michael Graziadei), a romance inspired by Romeo and Juliet. The couple were popular with viewers, who were saddened at their separation (because of Daniel's addiction to pornography).

Lily was later paired with leading character Cane Ashby (Daniel Goddard), a romance that has attracted significant fan attention. In 2009, the pair were married just before Lily was diagnosed with ovarian cancer, a storyline praised by viewers and critics. Lily and Cane had two children: Charlie and Mattie Ashby, born in 2010. The following year the couple divorced (after Cane faked his death and kept secrets from Lily), but reunited and were remarried in 2012. Khalil has received critical acclaim for her portrayal, which has garnered her an NAACP Image and Daytime Emmy Award. Critics have described her as having evolved from a "teen star" into a "leading lady".

== Casting ==
Winters was first portrayed as a child by Vanessa Carson in 1996, followed by Brooke Marie Bridges from 1998 to 2000. In August 2002, Khalil was cast in the role as a teenager at age 14. Lily was the first soap-opera role for which she auditioned. After screen tests with co-star Kristoff St. John and casting director Marnie Saitta, Khalil was given the part. In 2005 (after portraying the character for three years), Khalil left the series, citing stress as the reason for her departure. The producers tried unsuccessfully to convince Khalil to stay, and recast her role with Sherwood. Sherwood said that while the character Lily was the same, she and Khalil were not the same actress so it would be "a little different". Although she replaced a popular actress, Sherwood said she felt no anxiety over the recasting because Khalil chose to leave the part.

After leaving the series, Khalil and the producers began discussing her possible return. In 2006, she agreed to come back, and Sherwood was released from her contract. Former executive producer and head writer Lynn Marie Latham said she was happy with the casting change; she was impressed by Khalil's work, saying that she is a "brilliant actress". Latham noted that Sherwood did a "fine job" as the character, but "shows generally prefer to have original players back when they can get them". On her MySpace blog, Sherwood said she felt negativity from others on the set of the soap opera before her replacement; she was not told the reason for her firing, which she thought neither right nor fair. Khalil stated in 2007 that her return was a difficult decision to make, but was "the best decision ever".

On August 21, 2012, The Young and the Restless put out a casting call for the role of "Sally Tate", and the character description lead to speculation that it was a recast for Lily Winters and Khalil was exiting the soap. On August 22, Khalil's official website confirmed that she was leaving the show due to a contract dispute and her contract was set to expire in late-September. On August 23, 2012, Khalil gave an interview to MSN Entertainment in which she expressed her desire to remain on the show. Saying that she hoped she and the show could eventually come to a mutual agreement.

Upon learning of her impending exit, fans of Khalil began a letter write-in, snail mail, e-mail and phone call campaign in support of her remaining on the show. Fan outcry led producers to rethink recasting the role with newly appointed executive producer Jill Farren Phelps later saying that negotiations with Khalil had resumed and she "didn't yet know" how that would work out. On September 6, 2012, a plane carrying a banner stating "Y&R Fans Want Christel Khalil as Lily Ashby" was flown over CBS Television City in support of Khalil. Fans did a similar campaign in spring 2011 when Khalil's co-star Daniel Goddard was let go from the soap. In late September, newly appointed head writer Josh Griffith confirmed in an interview with TV Guide that contract negotiations had been resolved and Khalil would remain in the role. On August 27, 2018, Khalil announced her decision to drop to recurring status. As of August 2020, Khalil was once again listed as a series regular.

In October 2026, it was announced Khalil would crossover to Beyond the Gates as Lily. She appeared during the November 4 episode.

== Development ==
=== Characterization ===
In 2002, when Lily was rapidly aged to a teenager, the character was designed as an "angst-ridden" heroine who struggled with "trauma"; she was also described as strong, rebellious, and sassy. Khalil said that Lily "doesn't take anybody's crap" and "she's her own person". Sherwood was said to have brought a "fire" to the role, and was told to use it only when necessary. She described Lily as "a lot like her mother": "It makes sense. She spent a lot of time with her mother growing up and she's seen how her mother reacts to certain situations when there is a problem or a dilemma." When Khalil returned to the role she felt that Lily had changed "a great deal" since she last played her; she was more immature and although it was more fun, it was "definitely different".

In 2009, Soap Opera Digest said that Khalil and Lily had evolved from a "teen star" into a "leading lady". Khalil described her happiness with her character's evolution, with more adult storylines and having to "deal with things like losing a baby or breaking off her engagement [to Cane]". During her marital problems with Cane, Khalil described Lily as a "doormat" and "hopeless romantic", saying that her "daddy issues" were part of that.

=== Relationships ===
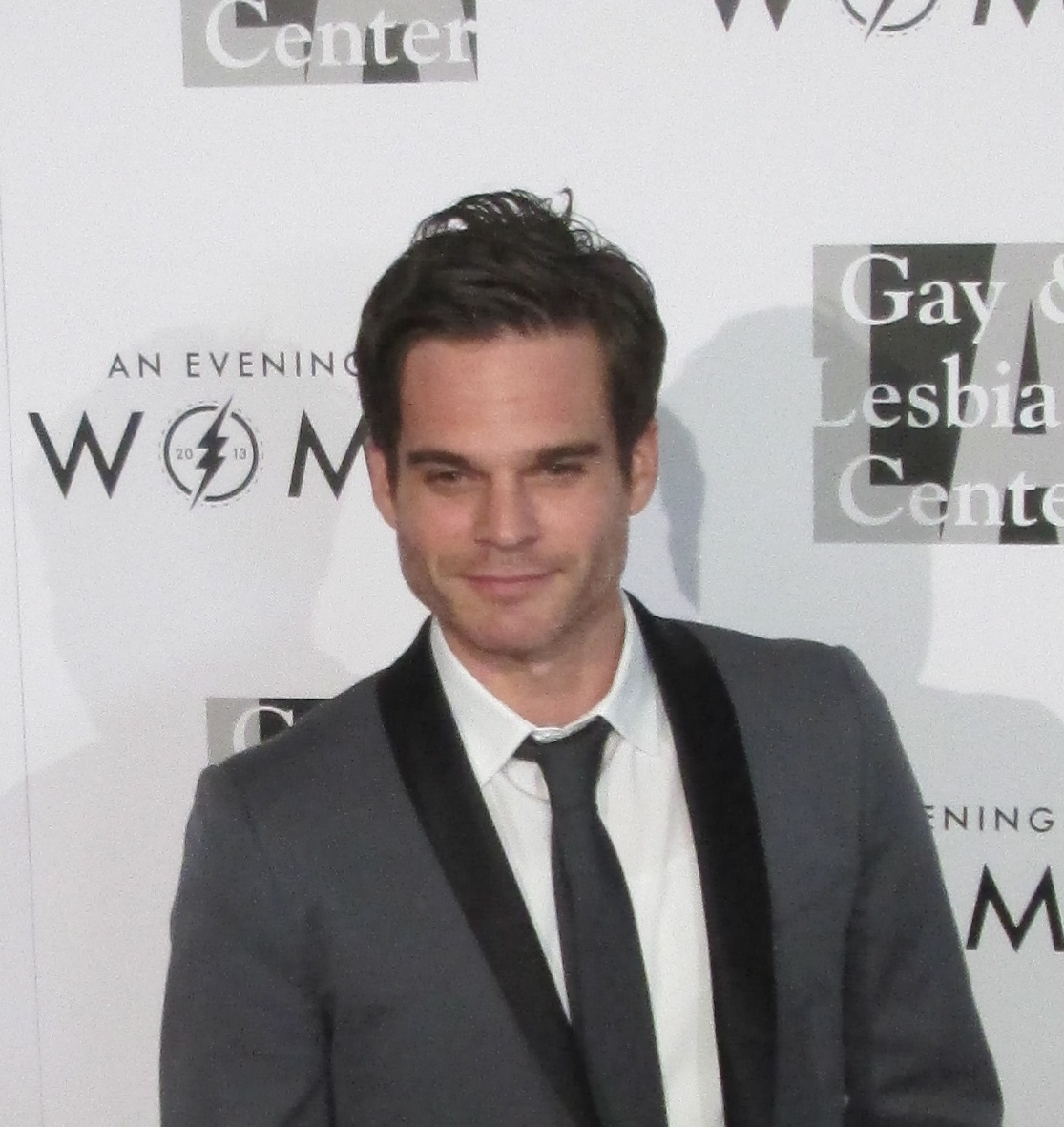
Greg Rikaart portrays Kevin, formerly an internet predator who targets Lily and infects her with chlamydia.

One of Lily's first storylines centered around her manipulation by internet predator Kevin Fisher (Greg Rikaart), who gives her the sexually transmitted disease chlamydia. Khalil taped public service announcements related to the story, and considered the plot one of her favorites: "How many soaps have really covered that? The meeting on the Internet, getting an STD, it was really great stuff." Lily was next involved in a Romeo and Juliet-inspired romance (attracting a significant fan following) with Daniel Romalotti (Michael Graziadei), Kevin's friend. Lily was said to have brought out a new side to Daniel's character, "taming" him. When Khalil left the show, former head writer John F. Smith promised the character's recast would "bring an entirely new level" to Lily and Daniel's romance. They fell in love and were married; the pair's popularity continued with Sherwood in the role.

Sherwood gave Lily more feistiness, although the character was never written as timid. Sherwood's interpretation drew comparisons to Lily's mother, Drucilla; that "fire" was brought into Daniel and Lily's relationship. Sherwood said that "Dru can be a little dramatic", and when Lily faces an issue with Daniel "she's not going to remain calm, she's going to do what she saw her mother do". The actress praised the pair's storyline for not focusing on the different races of the characters. Khalil was surprised by the advancement of Lily and Daniel's storyline when she returned, particularly the characters' marriage. The plot ended with a social issue: Daniel's addiction to pornography. Graziadei said, "My initial conflict was that Daniel has had so many problems with his wife that I couldn't figure out why he'd be doing this", and was concerned that Daniel might be seen as "lecherous and creepy". The pair tried to work through Daniel's addiction, but it ended their marriage.

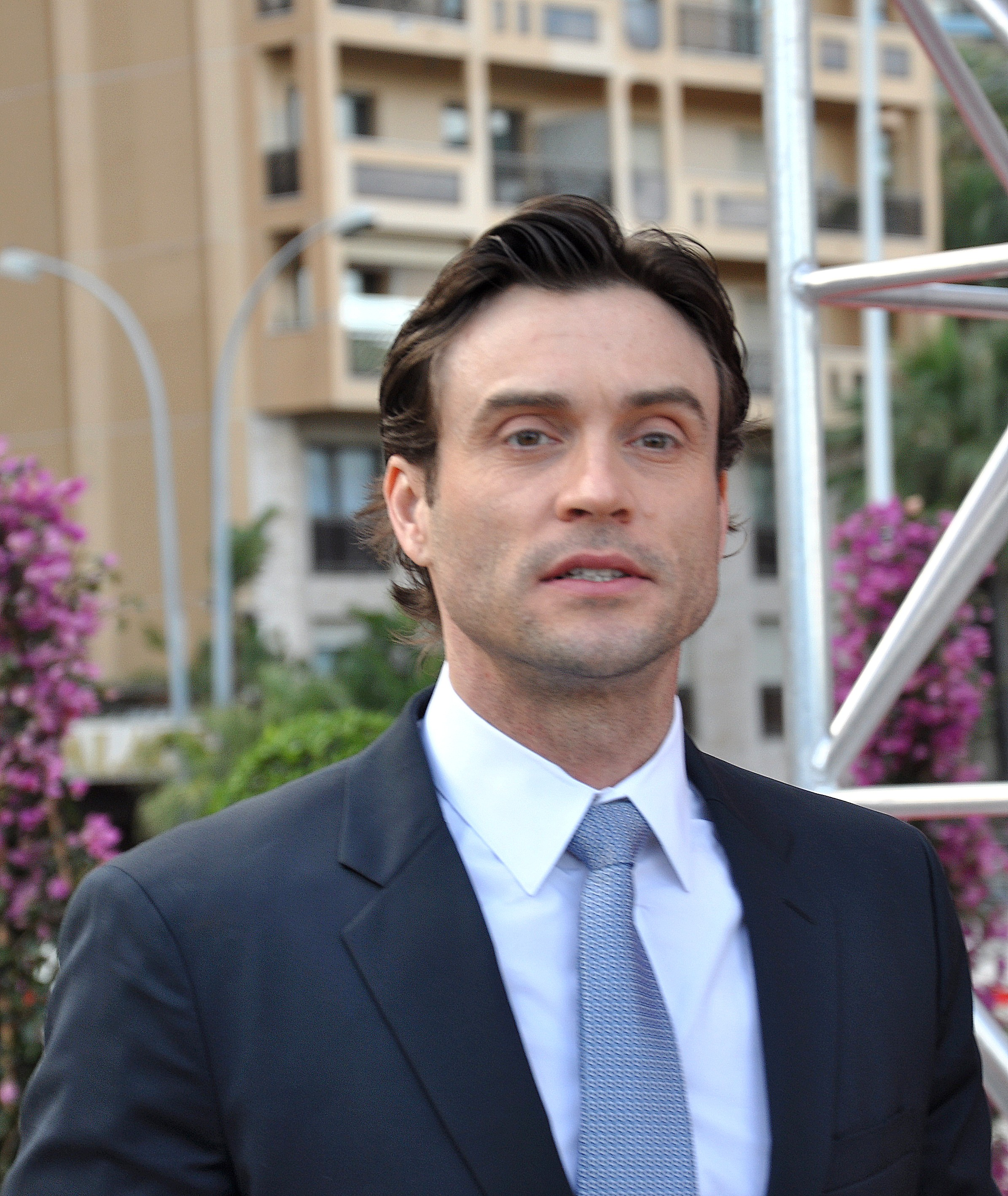
Daniel Goddard portrays Cane, Lily's love interest and later husband. Their pairing has garnered significant fan attention.

Lily was later written into a romance with Cane Ashby (Daniel Goddard) intertwined with a modeling career. The couple was designed as star-crossed true loves, and the relationship was said to add further growth to Lily's character. Khalil said that Lily had been in "kind of an immature relationship" and she thought being with a "real man" would make Lily grow up and "start thinking about her life and situation in a different way" and "would change Lily for the better". Goddard compared the romance to Lady Chatterley's Lover, as both characters grew and learned from the relationship. Storylines for the lovers included the characters' age gap, a miscarriage and a love rectangle with Chloe Mitchell (Elizabeth Hendrickson) and Billy Abbott (Billy Miller). In the love-rectangle story, Chloe deceives Cane into thinking they conceived a child. Goddard said he liked the storyline because of its originality. Love triangles and questioned paternity occur frequently in soap operas, but he felt that Maria Arena Bell made the plots fresh. Khalil said that she "loved" the storyline and the actors in it; she thought it "was a possibility" for Lily and Cane to have a happy ending, and Lily "can see the hope, and they can adapt and love each other in a more mature and honest way". In 2009, the pair were married. For their wedding, Lily wore the dress her mother Drucilla (Victoria Rowell) wore at her 1995 wedding to Neil. Rowell's dress was altered, at Khalil's request; she said it was an "old-fashioned, a typical '90s-style gown", and she "didn't really like it". Khalil spoke with Bell and the head of the wardrobe department about updating the dress. Bell agreed; there were "little details" about the original dress she wanted to keep, and it became "a really beautiful dress".

In 2010, Global BC said Lily was the love of Cane's life. The following year, she divorced him after his continued lies about his faked death. However, she eventually discovered that Cane was trying to protect her and they remarried. Khalil said that she never lost faith in the pair reuniting, since their romance is "so popular": "No matter what happens, they'll always get through it." Goddard noted that their relationship "had come full circle" and "was being done well". About Cane and Lily's second wedding, Goddard said that Cane and Lily have "certainly had a lot of ups and downs" but he thought their fans "stayed true and they have expressed their desire for what they want to see". He thought a wedding of "this caliber" would make their fans "very, very happy and that is what this is about".

=== Paternity and cancer ===
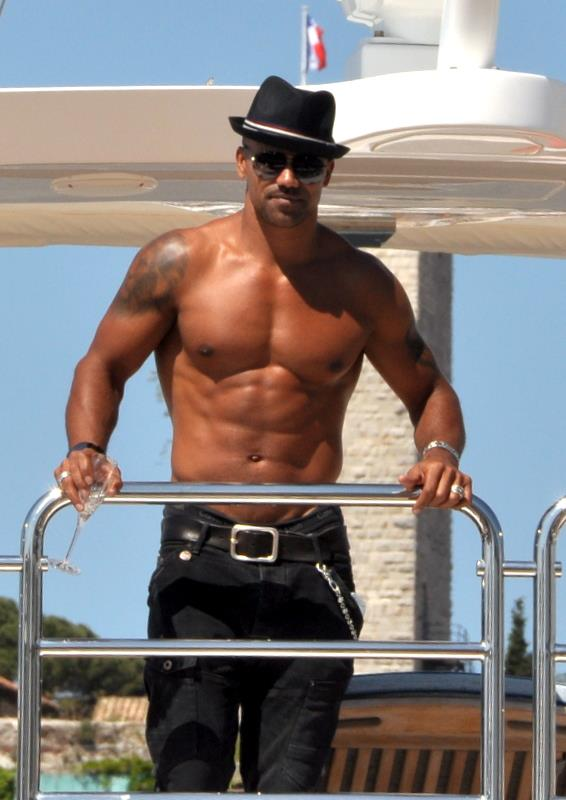
Shemar Moore portrayed Lily's biological father, Malcolm Winters.

Lily was born into a paternity storyline, with brothers Neil or Malcolm Winters her father. Her mother, Drucilla, had been dating Neil but, was raped by Malcolm (who knew full well that she thought he was Neil while she was groggy from medication). The storyline continued unresolved for several years, with Neil believing he was Lily's father. In 2006, former co-head writer Jack Smith decided to resolve Lily's paternity by revealing that Malcolm was her father. About the storyline, Smith said:

Well, if you think about it as a storyteller the potential for interesting drama is much more interesting if Malcolm is the biological father and not Neil. If Neil was the biological father, the whole sub textual romantic potential between Drucilla and Malcolm fades away. The relationship between Lily and Malcolm becomes your normal, traditional uncle/niece relationship. The relationship between Neil and Lily becomes your typical father/daughter relationship. But if Malcolm is the biological father then, wow! You've got the potential for years to come for fireworks.

In 2009, former head writer Maria Arena Bell developed a storyline about ovarian cancer for Lily. Bell said that the way Lily's struggle was playing out "is very much how it would play out in real life": "There's days where you feel exhausted and you feel powerless...It helps that on our writing team, we have one writer who's currently suffering from breast cancer, who put a lot of her own heart and soul into this story. I myself am a survivor [of] two different cancers." Khalil filmed a public-service announcement for CBS Cares about ovarian cancer and those affected by the disease. Lily shaves her head, requiring Khalil to wear hats, scarves, a bald cap and wigs. The wigs were shorter than the actress' real hair because the writers wanted to make sure the audience knew they were wigs. In 2010 Lily went into remission, and has since been cancer-free.

== Storylines ==
In 2002, Lily is a rebellious teenager. After living in Paris, her mother Drucilla (Victoria Rowell) moves her back to the United States after she sprayed graffiti in the city. Drucilla hopes that Lily's father, Neil (Kristoff St. John), will reason with her; however, they end up helping him deal with his alcoholism. Lily's parents reunite and plan to remarry—to her dismay, since she wanted her mother to be with Wesley Carter (Ben Watkins). Lily comes to terms with their relationship, becoming friends with Colleen Carlton (Lyndsy Fonseca). In 2004, Lily is victimized by Internet predator Kevin Fisher (Greg Rikaart), who rapes her and gives her a sexually transmitted disease. She forgives him after he saves her from another predator who is trying to rape her, but the situation was staged by Daniel Romalotti (Michael Grazaidei) to make Kevin look like a hero. Lily and Daniel begin dating, to their parents’ dismay. In 2006, they marry, and soon afterwards Lily discovers her biological father is her uncle Malcolm (Shemar Moore); this strains her relationship with her mother. They reconcile before Drucilla is presumed dead after falling off a cliff during an argument with Daniel's mother, Phyllis Summers (Michelle Stafford) and Sharon Abbott (Sharon Case). Lily discovers that Daniel has been hiding a pornography addiction which, despite counseling, ends their marriage. Lily is then attracted to Cane Ashby (Daniel Goddard), but they hesitate to begin a relationship because of their age difference. They eventually begin dating, despite disapproval from Neil.

Chloe Mitchell (Elizabeth Hendrickson) deceives Cane into believing he fathered her child; however, the child's biological father is Billy Abbott (Billy Miller). Cane's relationship with Lily is interrupted, but they become engaged when the truth about the child's paternity is revealed, and marry in February 2009. They briefly separate when Cane's true identity is revealed, but are reunited when Lily is diagnosed with ovarian cancer (and mourns the death of her best friend, Colleen). During her hysterectomy, two of her eggs are preserved; Cane and Lily want to have children, using Mackenzie Browning (Clementine Ford) as their surrogate mother. She gives birth to twins, Charlie and Mattie Ashby, in June 2010. Soon afterwards, Lily goes into remission; an Australian (Blake Joseph) arrives in Genoa City and blackmails Cane, followed by his father Colin Atkinson (Tristan Rogers) in December 2010. Colin is later engaged to Jill Abbott (Jess Walton), and Cane is shot to death by Blake as he tries to stop their wedding. After Cane's death, Lily sees hallucinations of him in the afterlife, leading her family to suggest therapy. After her “hallucination” leaves footprints in the snow, Lily realizes that Cane is alive, having faked his death; his twin brother, Caleb, was the one who died. Lily feels betrayed and decides to divorce Cane, but later realizes that the story surrounding his faked death was to protect her. They decide to remarry in February 2012 and work at Jabot Cosmetics, where Lily develops an attraction to Tyler Michaelson (Redaric Williams) which makes Cane jealous. Lily and Tyler share a kiss, but she turns him down and returns to Cane.

Afterward, Cane hires an assistant at Chancellor Industries, Hilary Curtis (Mishael Morgan), whom Jill and then Lily become suspicious of. Meanwhile, an unknown blogger is targeting the Winters family online, with photos of Hilary kissing Cane as well as the two of them in a hotel room. After a private investigation, the Winters figure out Hilary is the blogger (because she blames Neil for her mother's death years prior) just as Hilary attempts to drug Cane. She is fired from Chancellor Industries and shunned by the family. In 2014, after repairing their marriage, Cane and Lily agree to become the new managers of the Genoa City Athletic Club after her brother Devon Hamilton (Bryton James) buys it. In early 2015, on the heels of finding out Cane helped Hilary and Devon conceal their affair from her father, trust issues once again arise in Lily and Cane's marriage. Which are further exacerbated by Cane's new found closeness to his step aunt, Lauren Fenmore (Tracey Bregman). Lily expresses her discomfort at their closeness, which both dismiss, even though they share a kiss, which Lily later finds out about. The marriage continues to deteriorate to the point where Lily believes the two are having an affair and she, in an act of revenge, beds Joe Clark (Scott Elrod), a business associate and friend of Cane's. She confesses to Cane, who promptly dumps her. The two reconcile a few months later with, unbeknownst to them, Joe having grown obsessed with Lily. In fall 2015, Joe frames Cane for being involved in Hilary's disappearance, leaving Lily unsure of what to believe, which again drives a wedge between the two and Cane moves out of their home. Lily has sex with Joe again before realizing that he framed Cane. Lily helps Cane clear his name and is left devastated when Cane rejects her attempt to reconcile. The two eventually reconcile in 2016.

In 2017, Lily becomes the face of Brash & Sassy and quits the Athletic Club. While on a business trip to Tokyo, Cane gets drunk and has sex with their new co-worker, Juliet Helton (Laur Allen). Cane keeps the tryst a secret from Lily until months later Juliet reveals that she's pregnant. After a DNA test confirms Cane is the father, Lily initially chooses to stay with Cane due to their children and her own past infidelity. However, after Cane uses money set aside for the twins private school tuition to pay off a blackmailer, Lily is heartbroken by Cane's continued deception and kicks him out. During their separation Lily continues to get closer to her old friend and current Brash & Sassy photographer, Jordan Wilde (Darnell Kirkwood). The two share a kiss but Lily needs time to figure out what she wants. She later files for divorce from Cane but after Juliet dies during childbirth, she postpones the divorce for Cane's sake. Lily suggests Cane name his newborn son after his deceased younger sister, Samantha. In early 2018, Cane pursues Lily to Paris and the two reconcile. In the summer of 2018, Lily and a pregnant Hilary are involved in a car accident that ends Hilary's life. Lily, racked with guilt and being forced to by Devon, confesses to running the red light that caused the accident and is sentenced to 1 year in prison. In April 2019, Lily is released early and files for divorce from Cane, stating she wants a fresh start. Neil passes away unexpectedly on the day of her release, leaving her devastated. Cane pleads with Lily to stay with him in Genoa City but she leaves the day after her father's funeral to start a new life in Lakewood, Wisconsin as a teacher to the inmates with whom she was once imprisoned. In March 2020, Lily returned to Genoa City to run the new Chancellor Communications division alongside Billy Abbott.

== Reception ==
"Few people could have played the emotionally pummeled Lily as well as Christel Khalil. Physically, the young actress has an ethereal kind of beauty that works well in scenes of crisis... Yet Khalil has more to offer than her fragile appearance; there is an inner fire in her big, dark eyes that suggests she is no pushover, either."

— CBS Soaps In Depth on Khalil's portrayal during Lily's loss of her mother (2007)

Khalil as Winters has grown in popularity among viewers, who voted her onto "Top Actress" lists in publications such as Soap Opera Digest, Soaps In Depth and Soap Opera Update. Critics have also praised Khalil for her portrayal; Soap Opera Digest named her performer of the week during Lily's internet-predator storyline, citing the subtlety of her performance. Mark McGarry of Soap Opera Weekly named the actress outstanding performer of the week on February 28, 2005, praising Khalil's "remarkable range". CBS Soaps In Depth said Sherwood "got off to a slow start", but praised her work during the revelation that Lily's husband Daniel was responsible for her attempted rape by Alex. Khalil's return in 2006 was greeted positively by viewers.

Lily's cancer storyline was praised by critics and viewers. Janet Di Lauro of Soap Opera Weekly praised the storyline for highlighting Neil and Lily's relationship, saying that they "are one of the most effective and heartfelt father-daughter combos in daytime. Kristoff St. John and Christel Khalil share a chemistry that lets the viewers feel Neil's pain when Lily is hurting, and relate to his anger when she has been wronged." Di Lauro criticized the writers for placing a young character such as Lily into so many traumatic stories, including the cancer and hysterectomy. Soap Opera Digest made the cancer story its editor's choice; Di Lauro praised Khalil for her performance during the death of Lily's best friend Colleen Carlton (Tammin Sursok), calling Lily and Colleen's final scenes "a bona-fide tearjerker" and "one of the most touching scenes to air" during Colleen's death: "Lily could have easily fallen apart and chastised Colleen for leaving her during her house of need. Instead, she held her head high and gave Colleen a proper sendoff... It was as if Lily was gathering strength from Colleen, even as Colleen let go."

Lily's relationships with Daniel and Cane were listed among Soaps In Depth's 100 Greatest Soap Opera Couples. The Daniel-and-Lily storyline attracted viewer support for both Khalil and Sherwood, and the magazine called the scene when Daniel and Lily make love after his acquittal for the death of Cassie Newman (Camryn Grimes) one of the top three moments of 2005. Roscoe Born, who played Tom Fisher, praised their storyline: "It really brought the two families into so much conflict, and I thought they were very believable as young lovers. They were very passionate, and at the same time, really evoked that feeling of first love." When Lily and Daniel's marriage ended, fans of the couple were saddened.

Lily's romance with Cane first received a mixed response; viewers were divided on the couple because of the age difference between the characters. Khalil said that she was sure there were going to be people "who will always feel" that Cane is too old for Lily, but there are others "who just don't care about the age difference": "You can't please everyone. You just have to do your best with the storyline and hope that people will like it." Soap Opera Digest gave the couple a thumbs-up: "On paper, a Cane-and-Lily pairing shouldn't work. They've both just left marriages (to Amber and Daniel, though Cane's wasn't legal), their exes are living together, and Cane is older than Lily. Yet, the adorable Aussie and the cute coed make a charming match." The magazine praised the couple because they united the core families, the Winters and the Chancellors. Soap Opera Weekly considered their Valentine's Day surprise in 2008 "a hit".

Michael Fairman of On-Air On-Soaps called Cane and Lily "one of daytime's most popular couples", and their story with Billy and Chloe "one of soaps all-time best quadrangle story arcs". Mallory Harlen of Soap Opera Digest praised the quadrangle for adding another layer to Lily: "The always prim, always perfect Lily reminded me way too much of Christine Blair...in a bad way. But being a woman scorned really worked for her; her newfound feistiness is completely fitting for Drucilla's daughter." Nelson Branco of TV Guide Canada criticized the couple; he thought they had no chemistry and wanted Cane "in the big leagues and not with little girls", but conceded that they had "a very vocal, and loyal fanbase". Soap Opera Update named Cane and Lily the best couple on The Young and the Restless in 2008, and viewers voted them into top-couple polls in soap-opera magazines.

Khalil received two nominations for Outstanding Younger Actress at the 2004 and 2006 Daytime Emmy Awards, and two Young Artist Award nominations for Leading Young Actress in 2003 and 2004. Khalil and Sherwood received NAACP Award nominations for Lead Actress in a Daytime Drama Series in 2007. The following year, Khalil won the award, receiving another nomination in 2009. She earned a third Daytime Emmy Award nomination for Outstanding Younger Actress in 2010, for the episode when Lily learns she has cancer. In 2012 Khalil received another NAACP Award nomination, winning her first Daytime Emmy Award for Outstanding Younger Actress in a Drama Series in the role after four nominations in the category. In 2020, Khalil received her first nomination in the category of Daytime Emmy Award for Outstanding Supporting Actress in a Drama Series.

In 2023, Charlie Mason and Richard Simms from Soaps She Knows wrote that Daniel and Lily's rekindled romance had the "Most Potential" in American soap operas of that year, writing, "From the moment Daniel returned to Genoa City, it was pretty obvious that Young & Restless was going to give his pairing with Lily another try. And we're so glad they did! The chemistry shared by Michael Graziadei and Christel Khalil is off the charts, and throwing Heather into the mix shows real potential".
