= Angelica McDaniel =

American television producer

- Born: Minneapolis, Minnesota, U.S.
- Occupations: Television executive; Producer
- Years active: 1994–present
- Spouse: Brian McDaniel (2007–Present)

Angelica Rosas McDaniel is an American executive and multi-platform producer with experience in television, web and radio. She began her career in the entertainment industry at the age of 15 as an on-air personality for national children's network, Radio AAHS (1994) where she hosted a daily afternoon talk show. Soon she began producing What's Up with Evan Roberts? for a then 13-year-old Evan Roberts, who would eventually become the youngest afternoon talent for the New York sports station WFAN. In 2001 she joined the startup team of XM Satellite Radio where she produced the talk channel BabbleOn 167 for young adults.

McDaniel piloted the national afterschool Media Smart Youth' program with Secretary of Health and Human Services, Tommy Thompson (2004). In 2005 she moved to Los Angeles, California, where she became a producer for the Emmy award-winning daytime talk show "The Tyra Banks Show" for three seasons, followed by a position as a development and current executive for Telepictures Productions, a division of WarnerBros.

In 2010, she joined CBS as VP of daytime programming, overseeing the launch of the network's first daytime talk show, The Talk. In February 2012, Angelica was upped to SVP and became network TV's youngest Head of Daytime. In 2012, she was featured on THR's Next Gen 2012 list as one of Hollywood's fastest rising stars and appeared in Variety as a Daytime Impact Nominee. During McDaniel's rookie year as head of daytime, CBS nabbed 51 Daytime Emmy nominations and 21 wins, more than any other network.

McDaniel was named executive vice president of daytime programs and syndicated program development at CBS Entertainment and CBS Television Distribution in March 2015. She reports to Nina Tassler, chairman of CBS Entertainment, and Armando Nuñez, president and chief executive officer of CBS Global Distribution Group.

In this newly created role, McDaniel continues to oversee CBS Network's top-rated lineup in the day-part (daytime dramas The Young and the Restless and The Bold and the Beautiful, game shows The Price is Right and Let's Make a Deal, and the entertainment talk show The Talk), as well as development for all new first-run programming at CBS Television Distribution (CTD), the industry's leading domestic syndication company. She is also in charge of developing new series across all traditional and new genres of programming for the syndication marketplace.

McDaniel also oversaw the 2013–2014 season rebranding of CBS's Saturday morning programming block to “The CBS Dream Team, It's Epic!,” a three-hour FCC educational/informational-compliant programming block of six high-definition half-hours with a pro-social message targeted to viewers 13 to 16 years old and appealing to viewers of all ages.

On September 5, 2019, Angelica McDaniel exited her post as Executive VP in Daytime Programs, CBS Entertainment. McDaniel left amid a restructuring that saw her department absorbed by current programming.

Angelica has been recognized with seven Imagen Awards for her work as a Latina in entertainment and founded Raise Women, a mentorship organization connecting ambitious women of color with female leaders.

Angelica states that her two daughters motivate her work in supporting women’s professional advancement and leadership.

== See also ==
- Radio AAHS
- Evan Roberts (radio personality)
- The Talk (U.S. TV series)
