= Jabot Cosmetics =

Fictional cosmetics company

- The real and fictional logo for Jabot Cosmetics
- Company type: Publicly held company
- Industry: Cosmetics
- Founded: 1960s by John Abbott
- Headquarters: Genoa City, Wisconsin, United States
- Key people: Jack Abbott, Majority Owner and Chairman
- Products: Perfumes, Hair Care, Makeup

Jabot Cosmetics is a fictional cosmetics business on the CBS daytime soap opera The Young and the Restless. Jabot Cosmetics was founded by John Abbott in the 1960s. His children Jack Abbott, Ashley Abbott, and Billy Abbott have worked there with Jack the current CEO. It is currently owned by the Abbott family, with Kyle Abbott, Jack's son with Diane Jenkins, also working there. It is described as a line of "advanced scientific skincare and luxurious fragrances." In 2011, following a deal between CBS Consumer Products and Sony Pictures Television, the line became a "reality". The name Jabot is a portmanteau of John Abbott's first initial and surname, stylised into a more glamorous French; the word "jabot" refers to a garment style element, the ruffle on the front of a shirt.

The headquarters of the company is at Jabot Tower, which is depicted in establishing shots for scenes set there. The Ludwig Mies van der Rohe-designed Toronto-Dominion Centre is shown in these shots, with the Jabot logo on the top mechanical floors of the tallest tower, the TD Bank Tower.

== Fictional ==
=== Key people ===
Current owners

- The Abbott Family (majority owner)

Former owners

- John Abbott (majority owner) (deceased)
- Jack Abbott (majority owner)
- Victor Newman (majority owner)
- Nikki Newman (minority owner)
- Brad Carlton (minority owner) (deceased)
- Ji Min Kim (partnership with Jack Abbott) (deceased)
- Gloria Bardwell (minority owner)
- Jeffrey Bardwell (minority owner)
- Katherine Chancellor (majority owner) (deceased)

Current employees

- Jack Abbott (Chief Executive Officer and Chairman of the Board of Directors)
- Kyle Abbott (Chief Executive Officer of Marchetti Fashion, a division of Jabot Cosmetics)
- Summer Newman (Creative director for Marchetti Fashion a division of Jabot Cosmetics)

Former employees

- John Abbott (Founder, Chief Executive Officer, Chairman of the Board of Directors) (deceased)
- Ashley Abbott (Shareholder; Former CEO and Chemist)
- Jill Abbott (Shareholder, Board Member)
- Hilary Curtis Winters (Executive Assistant)
- Blade Bladeson (Photographer)
- Chelsea Newman (Fashion designer)
- Tyler Michaelson (Graphic designer)
- Leslie Michaelson (Legal council)
- Mari Jo Mason (Art Director)
- Cane Ashby (Chief Executive Officer)
- Sharon Newman (Spokesmodel)
- Malcolm Winters (Photographer)
- Carmen Mesta (PR Consultant) (deceased)
- Ji Min Kim (Chief Executive Officer) (deceased)
- Damon Porter (Chemist)
- Drucilla Winters (Executive) (Presumed dead)
- Victor Newman (Executive Consultant, Chief Executive Officer)
- Chloe Mitchell (Fashion Coordinator)
- Nikki Newman (Chief Executive Officer, Board Member)
- David Chow (Co-Chief Executive Officer, Board Member) (deceased)
- Victoria Newman (Vice President, Board Member)
- Gloria Abbott Bardwell (Shareholder, Former Director of Creative Affairs; Former Receptionist)
- Jeffrey Bardwell (Shareholder)
- Heather Stevens (Corporate Attorney, In-House Counsel)
- Brad Carlton (Former Chief Operating Officer) (deceased)
- Lily Winters (Fresh Face of Jabot Spokesmodel)
- Skip Evans (Photographer)
- Noah Newman (Photographer's Assistant, Photographer)
- Phyllis Summers (Chief Executive Officer)
- Kelly Andrews (Event manager)
- Theo Vanderway (Director of Social Media)

=== Products ===
- Tuvia
- Men's Line
- Glow By Jabot
- Passkey
- Jabot Go
- Marchetti Fashion

Former employees:
Brittany Hodges
Colleen Carlton
JT Hellstrom
Mackenzie Browning
Phyllis Summers
Raul Guittierez
Rianna Miner
Sean Bridges

=== Fictional company history ===
Jabot has had a tumultuous history. In the early 1980s, John considered following his son Jack's advice to sell Jabot but then changed his mind once he found out that the company offering to buy Jabot (Mergeron Enterprises) was owned by his ex-wife Dina Mergeron (Marla Adams). A few years later Jabot had another shake up when after finding out his son Jack Abbott (then Terry Lester, now Peter Bergman) was having an affair with his younger wife Jill Foster Abbott (then Brenda Dickson, now Jess Walton) he disowned Jack and fired him from Jabot. John filed for divorce and because he didn't want the facts about Jack and Jill's affair made public he gave Jill a divorce settlement that included 1/4 ownership of Jabot, an executive position worth $150,000 a year, and a seat on the Jabot Board of Directors. John replaced Jack with his new son-in-law Brad Carlton (Don Diamont), who was a salesman to that point. Jill and Brad started the Jabot Men's Line and made it into a success. But after a while the job became too much for Brad to handle and so John hired Jack back.

In 1990, Jack convinced John to go public with Jabot, by selling shares of Jabot stock in the stock market. This backfired on Jack when his rival Victor Newman (Eric Braeden) bought enough shares to take over control of Jabot. Losing Jabot caused John to have a heart attack and caused Victor to fire Jack and replace him with Brad (this because Victor and John were good friends). To get back at Victor, Jack married Victor's ex-wife Nikki Newman (Melody Thomas Scott), before Victor could propose remarriage to Nikki. Victor offered to give control of Jabot back to the Abbott family, if Jack divorced Nikki. Even though Jack had fallen in love with Nikki, he accepted Victor's offer out of guilt and loyalty to John. But Victor used a loophole in the contract and voided the deal. Jack did however return to work at Jabot. After Nikki found out Jack chose Jabot over her she started divorce proceedings. But after Jack saved her daughter Victoria's life and then finding out she was pregnant with Jack's child, Nikki decided to stay with Jack. Victor later married Jack's sister and Jabot's chemist Ashley Abbott (then Brenda Epperson, now Eileen Davidson).

A couple of years later Jack with Brad planned a hostile takeover of Newman Enterprises. But Victor found out about it and during a heated exchange Victor fired Jack and then collapsed. Jack walked over Victor and towards the door leaving him to die. But Jack used his better judgement and called 911, saving Victor's life.

After having confrontations with Ashley, Nikki, and his daughter Victoria, Victor went on a trip to the country to get away from his problems. Victor was robbed and carjacked and the man who did it ended up dying in a car accident in Victor's car. Everyone back in Genoa City thought Victor was dead and so Jack used "Victor's death" to his advantage and took over control of Newman Enterprises. This also meant he controlled Jabot as well. Jack appointed Brad head of Newman Enterprises. Months later Victor returned to Genoa City alive and well. Victor once again fired Jack for taking over control of Newman Enterprises and as a result John and Ashley resigned from Jabot. The Abbotts decided to create a new cosmetics company to rival Jabot. But because of Victor their loan application was denied and so their plans were halted. Jack then promised to stay away from Jabot if Victor hired John and Ashley back. Eventually Jack returned to Jabot as well.

Many years later, Victor was missing and once again thought to be dead after his airplane crashed in New Mexico. Jack and Brad once again took over control of Newman Enterprises by changing spreadsheet numbers and packing the Newman Board of Directors with Jack's old flame and Victor's newest ex-wife Diane Jenkins (Alex Donnelley) and with her lawyer Michael Baldwin (Christian LeBlanc). When Victor returned it was tougher for him to wrest control of his company away from Jack and Brad.

In the fall of 2012, Jack took control of Newman Enterprises and implemented a merger between the two companies. He hired Neil as CEO so he could concentrate on running Newman Enterprises. However, Jack fired Neil after a disagreement and brought in Cane to act as CEO. Cane, who was uncomfortable with replacing his father-in-law, brought Neil back in to run the company while Jack was distracted by his pill addiction and ongoing efforts by Victor to regain control of Newman.

== Real Jabot cosmetics ==
Jabot Cosmetics
- Company type: product line
- Industry: Cosmetics
- Founded: June 2011
- Headquarters: United States
- Key people: Tracey E. Bregman (spokesperson); Patricia Denney (wardrobe/stylist)
- Products: Perfumes, Hair Care, Makeup
- Website: Jabot Cosmetics on Twitter www.shopjabot.com www.jabotcosmetics.com

In June 2011, the cosmetics line was made a "reality" when a licensing deal was struck between CBS Consumer Products and Sony Pictures Television. The cosmetics are manufactured by Fusion Brands. The products range from $15 to $40 USD. In a statement, then-executive producer/head writer Maria Arena Bell stated: "For the first time our fans can own a piece of the show, and at the same time, share in the storyline as it unfolds live on TV [...] The brand launch is going to be completely integrated to the show. The back story on how Jabot started and product development is going to be featured in Y&R story lines, and we are going to use actual Jabot products on-set with the same packaging as you will see in retail. Plus, viewers will soon see a new Jabot set as well!" The line had its official debut at the Daytime Emmy Awards of 2011; additionally Tracey E. Bregman who plays Lauren Fenmore hosted a special on the Home Shopping Network. Jabot products are no longer manufactured, but some can still be found for sale online.

== See also ==
- Ashley Abbott
- Victor Newman
