= Redaric Williams =

American actor

- Born: Jimmie Williams; June 8, 1981 (age 45); Petoskey, Michigan
- Education: University of North Texas (dropped out, 2002–04)
- Occupations: Actor, model, songwriter, author
- Years active: 1992–present
- Known for: Tyler Michaelson on The Young and the Restless

Jimmie Williams, known professionally as Redaric Williams, (born June 8, 1981) is an American actor, model, author and musician. As an actor, he is best known for his role as Tyler Michaelson on the U.S. daytime drama, The Young and the Restless.

== Personal life ==
Redaric Williams was born in Petoskey and raised in Detroit. He has four older sisters, a twin sister, as well as a younger sister and a younger brother. Frequently moving as a youth, he attended three different high schools before graduating from Denby High School in Detroit Williams attended the University of North Texas as a student athlete for UNT's NCAA Division One football team, also running track and field. He majored in business but developed a passion for performing as a result of taking drama and theater courses throughout his years in school. He eventually left college to pursue a career in acting. He was given the nickname "Red" due to his skin tone.

== Career ==
Redaric began acting at the age of 11 on a Canadian children's TV series. After leaving college, Redaric relocated to New York City where he began professional training as an actor doing theater and independent films while working night shifts as a bouncer, doorman, and bartender at various New York City nightclubs. Though he initially opposed the idea, Redaric finally started modeling after receiving multiple modeling job offers. After several successful brand campaigns, he quickly became the face of Carling Black Label based in South Africa. At this time, Redaric decided to recommit himself to acting and he signed on for the role of Tyler Michaelson on The Young and the Restless. He revealed that when he registered with the Screen Actors Guild (SAG), the name, Jimmie Williams was already being used, so he chose to go by Redaric Williams.

While living in New York, Williams founded a social media company with two other friends.

== Filmography ==
Year	Title	Role	Notes
1992	Hands Up, Hands On	Himself	Recurring role
2010	Hanging in the Paint	Unknown	Lead role
2011	Adrenaline Lifeline	Pretty Boy Floyd	
2011	Damages	Aggressive patron	2 episodes
2012	Allegiance	Private Adams	
2012–2014	The Young and the Restless	Tyler Michaelson	Contract role
2016	Lucifer	Ty Huntley	1 episode
2017	The Quad	Jason King	
2017	Miss Me This Christmas	Franklin Young	
2021	Don't Waste Your Pretty	Michael	
2022	Haus of Vicious	Kane	Main role
2022–2023	Double Cross	DeAndre	Main role (Seasons 3–4)
2023–present	Zatima	Paul	Main role (Season 2–present)

== Awards and nominations ==
Year	Award	Work	Result	Ref
2014	NAACP Image Award for Outstanding Actor in a Daytime Drama Series	The Young and the Restless	Nominated	
