= Mark Pinter =

American actor (born 1950)

- Born: March 7, 1950 (age 75); Decorah, Iowa, U.S.
- Education: Iowa State University (BA); Wayne State University (MFA)
- Occupation: Actor
- Years active: 1978–present
- Spouses: Colleen Zenk (m. 1986–2010) Jenie Dahlmann (m. 2017)
- Children: 6
- Relatives: Carson Daly (son-in-law)

Mark Pinter (born March 7, 1950) is an American actor best known for his numerous roles in daytime soap operas.

== Early life and education ==
Pinter was born in Decorah, Iowa. He earned a Bachelor of Arts degree in theatre arts from Iowa State University and a Master of Fine Arts from the Hilberry Theatre at Wayne State University.

== Career ==
=== Acting ===
Often cast as a villain, Pinter has been a contract player on such shows as Love of Life, Guiding Light, As the World Turns, Loving, and All My Children. His most famous role was that of crooked politician Grant Harrison on Another World (1991–99), for which he won the Soap Opera Digest Award for Best Villain in 1996.

In addition to his work in daytime television, Pinter has guest-starred on numerous primetime television series such as Law & Order and performed extensively on regional theatre stages across the country. He has also appeared in Norman Jewison's Other People's Money and Cameron Crowe's Vanilla Sky. He has starred in the independent films Season of Youth and The Eden Myth.

A classically trained stage actor, Pinter has enjoyed numerous roles on renowned stages across the country including The Arena Stage in Washington, DC and The Old Globe Theater in San Diego, CA, and The York Theater Company off Broadway. Most recently, he played Avery Brundage in the world premiere production of Kemp Power's play The Nineteenth at The Old Globe Theater.

=== Directing ===
Pinter made his directorial debut in 2003 when he directed the world premiere of Jonathan Bell's Portraits at the Union Square Theatre in New York. The play starred Roberta Maxwell and Dana Reeve.

== Personal life ==
Pinter has six biological children and three step-children. His daughter, Siri, is married to television and radio host Carson Daly. Pinter was married to fellow soap opera star Colleen Zenk from 1986 to 2010. In 2017, he married Jenie Dahlmann who serves as co-CEO and Chief Marketing and Communications officer for Overture Center for the Arts in Madison, WI. They reside in Madison.

== Filmography ==
=== Film ===
Year	Title	Role	Notes
1991	Other People's Money	Bart	
1999	The Eden Myth	Edward Speck	
2001	Vanilla Sky	Carlton Kaller	

=== Television ===
Year	Title	Role	Notes
1978	Go West, Young Girl	Lieutenant	Television film
1978	Barnaby Jones	Mark	Episode: "A Dangerous Affair"
1978	Crash	Stretcher Bearer	Television film
1980	Love of Life	Dr. Tom Crawford	2 episodes
1980	The Love Boat	Hud Hanson	Episode: "Target Gopher/The Major's Wife/ Strange Honeymoon/The Oilman Cometh"
1980–1981	Secrets of Midland Heights	Calvin Richardson	11 episodes
1981	Hart to Hart	Chris Barber	Episode: "Blue Chip Murder"
1981	Charlie's Angels	Ted Markham	Episode: "Angel on a Roll"
1981	Behind the Screen	Karl Madison	Television film
1982–1983	Guiding Light	Mark Evans	7 episodes
1984–1987	As the World Turns	Brian McColl	39 episodes
1988–1989	Loving	Dan Hollister	9 episodes
1990	Hunter	Ken Delwin	Episode: "Sudden Withdrawal"
1991–1999	Another World	Grant Harrison / Spencer Harrison	177 episodes
1999	Law & Order	Raymond Quinn	Episode: "Sundown"
2001	Law & Order: Special Victims Unit	Jordan Owens	Episode: "Secrets"
2001–2002	All My Children	Roger Smythe	8 episodes
2004	Law & Order: Criminal Intent	James Townsend	Episode: "Ill-Bred"
2008	Cold Case	Hayden Chapin	Episode: "Ghost of My Child"
2008–2010	General Hospital	Agent Thomas Rayner	41 episodes
2010	FutureStates	Senator	Episode: "Play"
2010	NCIS: Los Angeles	Sebastian Renner	Episode: "Absolution"
2013	The Young and the Restless	Marcus Wheeler	22 episodes
2014	Mad Men	Irwin Podolsky	Episode: "Time Zones"
2016	Grace and Frankie	Jerry	Episode: "The Test"
2018	Reverie	Male Boardmember	Episode: "Point of Origin"
2020	Narcos: Mexico	John Bell	2 episodes
