= Jill Farren Phelps =

American television producer

- Born: Jill Farren; New York City, New York, U.S.
- Education: Carnegie Mellon University
- Occupation: Television producer
- Known for: The Young and the Restless, General Hospital
- Spouse: Robert Phelps
- Children: 1

Jill Farren Phelps is an American television producer. She is known for her work with American soap operas, having served as executive producer of Santa Barbara, Another World, Guiding Light, One Life to Live, General Hospital, and The Young and the Restless.

== Background ==
Jill Farren was born in New York City and earned a BFA in directing from Carnegie Mellon University in Pittsburgh, Pennsylvania. She became a stage manager at McCarter Theater in Princeton, New Jersey before becoming a production assistant for various New York stage productions.

She began her television career in 1974 with Guiding Light as a production assistant. From 1977 to 1984, she served as an Emmy Award-winning music director on the ABC Daytime drama General Hospital. In 1984 she joined Santa Barbara where she ultimately rose to the position of executive producer. She has since worked as an executive producer at all three major U.S. television networks producing six daytime dramas, as well as two prime-time dramas on cable television.

== Career overview ==
Phelps has been the executive producer of six American television daytime dramas, a record in the soap industry, including Santa Barbara (1987–1991), Guiding Light (1991–1995), Another World (1995–1996; resigned August 4, 1996), One Life to Live (December 29, 1997– January 22, 2001), General Hospital (January 2001–January 2012), and The Young and the Restless (October 2012–July 2016).

Additionally, she has served as executive producer of two prime time cable dramas, the first season of SOAPnet's prime time General Hospital spin-off General Hospital: Night Shift (2007), and Nick at Nite's Hollywood Heights (2012). Phelps broke into the daytime television industry as a production assistant on Guiding Light. She served as a music director on General Hospital and later on Santa Barbara before she started producing. During Phelps' time at Santa Barbara, the show won three consecutive Daytime Emmy Awards for Outstanding Drama Series (1988 - 1990). She won four more Emmys in the same category while serving as executive producer at General Hospital (2005, 2006, 2008, and 2012).

On December 1, 2011, it was announced that Phelps' run in the television industry was coming to an end, and that she would be replaced as General Hospital's executive producer by former One Life to Live executive producer Frank Valentini. In January 2012, Phelps accepted a position as executive producer of Hollywood Heights, a night-time soap opera airing on Nick at Nite. On July 26, 2012, Sony Pictures Television, which produced Hollywood Heights, announced Phelps had been named executive producer of The Young and the Restless. Phelps was dismissed in June 2016, following the appointment of British television producer, Mal Young.

=== Santa Barbara ===
In 1984, Phelps was hired as a music director after previously working in a similar capacity at General Hospital. She rose through the ranks, and was later promoted to producer. In 1987, when executive producer Mary-Ellis Bunim was let go, NBC Daytime named Phelps executive producer. Under Phelps' leadership, the show saw a moderate increase in the ratings and won three consecutive Daytime Emmy Awards for Outstanding Drama Series in 1988, 1989, and 1990.

=== Guiding Light ===
After Robert Calhoun left Guiding Light, Phelps, who had recently departed Santa Barbara, took over as executive producer in 1991.

=== Another World ===
While Phelps was executive producer at Another World, the creation of an updated opening sequence and refreshed sets, along with casting and other changes, were credited with ratings improving in the key demographic of women 18–49 by 34%.

=== One Life to Live ===
After Phelps resigned as executive producer of Another World, ABC Daytime hired her as executive producer of One Life to Live in 1997.

=== General Hospital ===
Phelps was named executive producer of General Hospital in 2001. During her tenure there, the show won four Daytime Emmy Awards for Outstanding Drama Series (2005, 2006, 2008, and 2012).

One highlight of Phelps' time at General Hospital was the addition of television and screen actor James Franco to the cast. Franco has portrayed the mysterious Robert "Franco" Frank intermittently since 2009.

Phelps was replaced by former One Life to Live executive producer Frank Valentini in January 2012. The future of the show Phelps led for over a decade has been uncertain due to poor ratings, but GH was renewed in April, 2012 for another year.

=== General Hospital: Night Shift ===
In 2007, Phelps served as the executive producer for the first season of SOAPnet's prime time General Hospital spin-off General Hospital: Night Shift.

=== Hollywood Heights ===
In January 2012, Phelps was hired as executive producer of Hollywood Heights, a soap opera for Nick at Nite. The 80-episode limited series, which premiered on June 18, revolves around Loren (Brittany Underwood), a teen whose life is transformed after becoming a music star. Phelps shared producing duties with Hisham Abed and the show's head writer, fellow daytime drama veteran Josh Griffith, and she is working with several former daytime television actors on the show, most notably recurring General Hospital cast member James Franco (ex-Franco).

=== The Young and the Restless ===
In July 2012, following the firing of executive producer and head writer Maria Arena Bell and co-head writer Scott Hamner, Sony Pictures Television appointed Phelps executive producer of The Young and the Restless, alongside the show's former head writer Josh Griffith. She was let go from the show in June 2016.

Phelps returned to The Young and the Restless as a producer in August 2025.

== Controversies ==
=== Firing of Anna Lee ===
In 2003, Phelps did not renew the contract of nonagenarian veteran screen and television actress Anna Lee, who had portrayed matriarch Lila Quartermaine on General Hospital for a quarter of a century. According to fellow cast member Leslie Charleson, Lee had been promised the role for life by former executive producer Wendy Riche. Charleson said in 2007, "The woman was in her 90s ... they fired her, and it broke her heart. It was not necessary." Lee died of pneumonia the following year, aged 91.

=== The Young and the Restless sets ===
Among other changes at The Young and the Restless, Phelps' (and head writer Josh Griffith) revamped some long-running sets. In 2012, the Newman Ranch was destroyed by fire in a storyline, with Entertainment Weekly noting, "Who won't miss the way-too-compact Newman ranch?" The magazine praised the set's successor, Victor Newman's penthouse, calling it "a welcome step in the right direction".

However, polled fan reaction was largely negative to the 2016 revamp of the Chancellor mansion set. Phelps was dismissed in June 2016, following CBS' decision to promote Mal Young to the executive producer position.

== Awards and nominations ==
As an executive producer, Phelps has been nominated for fifteen Daytime Emmy Awards and has won nine times (1988–1990, 2005–06, 2008, 2012, and 2014–15).
