= Gloria Abbott Bardwell =

Fictional character

- The Young and the Restless character
- Judith Chapman as Gloria Abbott Bardwell
- Portrayed by: Joan Van Ark (2004–2005); Judith Chapman (2005–2023)
- Duration: 2004–2018; 2020–2023
- First appearance: June 9, 2004
- Last appearance: December 28, 2023
- Created by: Kay Alden, John F. Smith and Trent Jones
- Introduced by: William J. Bell and John F. Smith (2004); Bradley Bell (2014); Anthony Morina and Josh Griffith (2020)
- Crossover appearances: The Bold and the Beautiful
In-universe information
- Other names: Gloria Simmons; Gloria Fisher; Clarissa
- Occupation: Executive assistant; Waitress; Realtor; Nightclub owner (2010–2012)
- Husband: River Baldwin (1957–1975); Tom Fisher (1976–2006); John Abbott (2004–2005, 2005–2006); William Bardwell (2007); Jeffrey Bardwell (2008, 2008–2009, 2012–2016)
- Sons: Michael Baldwin; Kevin Fisher
- Grandsons: Fenmore Baldwin; Miles Fisher
- Granddaughters: Bella Fisher

Gloria Abbott Bardwell is a fictional character from The Young and the Restless, an American soap opera on the CBS network. The role was originated by Joan Van Ark on June 9, 2004, who portrayed the role until 2005, with Judith Chapman assuming the role on January 17, 2005. She is the mother of Michael Baldwin (Christian LeBlanc) and Kevin Fisher (Greg Rikaart). She is known for attracting troublesome men, and being quite troublesome herself. Gloria can be naive at times, always taking things to the extreme. Known for her over-the-top personality, she owned and operated Gloworm, the hottest Genoa City club, until it burned down.

== Casting ==
In March 2004, it was reported that former Knots Landing star Joan Van Ark would join The Young and the Restless as Gloria Fisher, mother of Michael Baldwin and Kevin Fisher. CBS reportedly wanted a "big name" star to tackle the role of Gloria. Van Ark debuted on June 9, 2004. By December, news broke that Van Ark had decided to leave The Young and the Restless because she was unaccustomed to the rigors of daytime television, including the long work days and the fast turnaround on scripts and production. Within weeks, the role was recast with Judith Chapman; Van Ark was last seen on January 7, 2005, and Chapman assumed the role on January 17, 2005. In March 2011, it was announced that Chapman had been taken off her contract and bumped to a recurring status.

In October 2014, it was announced that Chapman would appear as Gloria on the soap opera's sister series, The Bold and the Beautiful, with her scenes airing on November 20, 2014 (episode 6958). In September 2015, Chapman stated on her Facebook page that she had "no idea" whether or not she would ever be asked back to The Young and the Restless, writing that she personally believed she would never return. In November 2016, however, upon the installation of Sally Sussman as co-executive producer and head writer, Chapman was announced to be returning to The Young and the Restless the following month for an unspecified amount of time. Upon her return, the actress stated: "This is all such a nice surprise. I had truly made peace with the idea that I would never be called back to the show." She last appeared on October 1, 2018. In September 2020, it was announced Chapman would again reprise the role; she returned October 20.

== Development ==
Gloria is known for her larger-than-life personality. According to Chapman, "She makes gallons of lemonade when the world gives her lemons!" Chapman also admires Gloria's resilience: "Somehow she just keeps finding the bright things. She gets very depressed of course, but the universe keeps throwing her a bone. I love that about her; that she's willing to pick herself up by the boot straps. Even though her intentions and her judgments are often times misguided. Gloria is not a malicious person, but she will certainly take every opportunity to improve her lot in life!"

On October 21, 2014, Michael Logan from TV Guide reported that Chapman would cross over to The Young and the Restless' sister soap The Bold and the Beautiful on November 20. Gloria will attend a Forrester fashion show, where she makes "a beeline" for Eric Forrester (John McCook), whom she previously met at Victor (Eric Braeden) and Nikki Newman's (Melody Thomas Scott) wedding in 2013. A show spokesperson commented, "expect some business talk and a little flirting."

== Storylines ==
=== Backstory ===
In the 1960s, Gloria Simmons was a naive 16-year-old girl living in Detroit, Michigan. She met the charming River Baldwin (Michael Gross) in Ann Arbor, Michigan, and he dropped out of college to live in a hippie commune with Gloria. Then, Gloria got pregnant, and she gave birth to their son, Michael Baldwin (now played by Christian LeBlanc). River and Gloria became Vietnam War protesters, and River was accused of a bomb conspiracy that killed a janitor. In reality, River tried to stop the bomb threat, but he was forced to flee to Canada in order to protect Gloria and Michael. Thus, Gloria was left alone to raise her son for 10 years.

In the 1970s, Gloria still lived in Detroit with Michael, and she worked as a waitress at a diner. There, she met Tom Fisher. Gloria and Tom got married, and their son, Kevin Fisher, was born. Terrible Tom, as he soon became known, was an alcoholic who often took out his anger on the boys. When Michael was a teenager, he left home to escape Tom's wrath. Gloria was too afraid to stop her husband, and Kevin was often beaten and locked in closets by his father. When Kevin was old enough, he ran away from Tom, and he moved in with Michael. Both brothers ended up in Genoa City; Michael became a prominent lawyer, but both boys got into their fair share of troubles. Eventually, Kevin fled Genoa City, and he found Gloria in Detroit, living in the same apartment as before. Kevin's criminal activity followed him there, and Gloria accompanied him back to Genoa City when he was found with her. Reluctantly, Michael agreed to let Kevin and Gloria live with him.

=== 2004–2018 ===
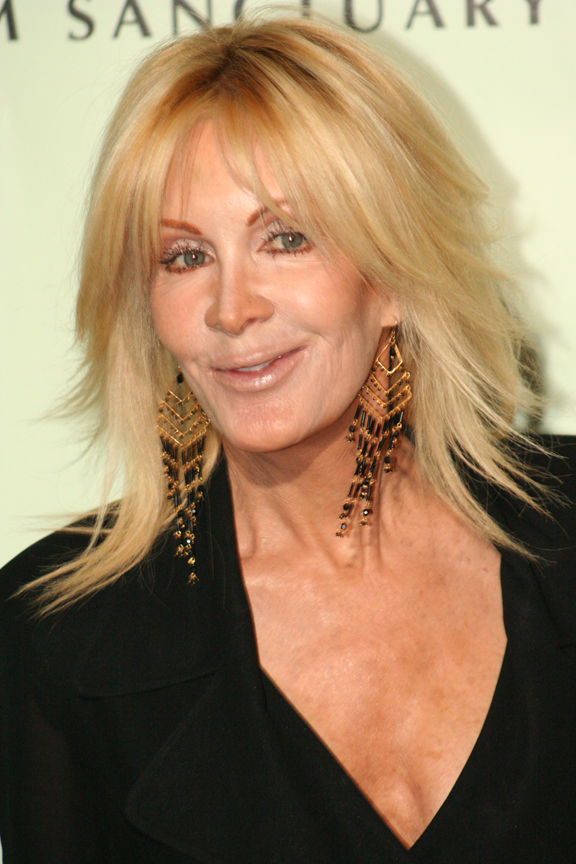
When Gloria arrived in Genoa City, Joan Van Ark portrayed the role; she exited due to the demands of production.

Gloria arrived in Genoa City in April 2004. Soon Gloria enchanted the much older owner of Jabot Cosmetics, John Abbott, Sr. Gloria and John went on a cruise together, and they returned as a married couple. John's children, Ashley and Jack Abbott, disapproved of their new stepmother. The following year, Tom arrived in Genoa City. While investigating, Michael found out that Gloria never officially divorced Tom as Gloria believed he had died, invalidating her marriage to John. Tom blackmailed Gloria into stealing money from John, while she led him to believe that she was using the money for Michael's wedding to Lauren Fenmore. Tom and Gloria legally ended their marriage and she and John remarried in an official ceremony. Gloria went along with Tom's lie in order to prevent herself from being outed by him to John. Tom teamed up with an old accomplice, Sheila Carter, to take down Michael and Lauren on their wedding day. Eventually, John gunned down Tom in an alley after Tom and Sheila took Lauren hostage. During a struggle, Tom was killed and John later got into a car accident, where he lost his memory.

Though Ashley falsely confessed, John soon remembered what he had done and after confessing, was sentenced to seven years in prison for killing Tom. While John was incarcerated, Gloria, hoping to endear herself to her stepchildren, obtained a sample of "GloAgain," Jabot's latest skincare product, from Ashley. She tainted it, planning on catching the "mishap" just in time, before the product went out to the market, hoping she'd look like the hero. Unbeknownst to Gloria, however, Jack sent the samples of product out early to select Jabot customers, and a woman died from using the tainted skin cream. Katherine Chancellor, who was running Jabot in John's absence, blamed Jack for the tragedy, firing him from the company. Gloria became friends with Katherine and John's ex-wife, Jill Abbott. She moved Kevin into the Abbott Mansion, and both she and Kevin got jobs at Jabot. While John was in prison, Jack, Ashley, and Gloria found out that he was being over-medicated. While his father was not in his right mind, Jack convinced him to write a letter that wrote Gloria out of his will. Six months after his incarceration, John was due to be pardoned by the governor. Before he was released, he suffered a massive stroke, and he was left in a vegetative state. Before his health decline, John signed a DNR, and he died with his family and friends surrounding him in 2006.

Jack, still resentful over the circumstances that led to his father's incarceration, intentionally lied to Gloria about the time of the service, causing her to miss John's funeral. When Gloria, Michael, Kevin, and Lauren arrived and discovered that they'd missed the funeral, they held their own memorial, where Gloria eulogized John. Jack and Ashley were stunned to discover that Gloria received 50% of their father's fortune through his will. A prison chaplain came forward, and he gave a judge John's handwritten letter that wrote Gloria out of the will. Appalled, Gloria did not receive any of John's fortune through his final modification and she discovered that her divorce from Tom was never finalized, yet again invalidating their second marriage. Jack kicked Gloria and Kevin out of the Abbott Mansion and they were forced to move in with Michael and Lauren. Still, Gloria wasted no time moving on. She romanced district attorney William Bardwell, who recently inherited a fortune from his uncle's death. William was also recently widowed and he and Gloria met at a grief counseling session. Jill Abbott also pursued William, but Gloria schemed in order to win his heart. She then discovered that William was investigating the Jabot skin cream scandal and she quickly married him to throw him off in 2007. William soon admitted that he didn't receive his inheritance yet due to legality issues. When William discovered that Gloria tainted the skin cream, he loved her too much to turn her in. The stress of his decision affected his health. Suddenly, he had a stroke and Gloria went to turn herself in. William stopped her from throwing her life away but his condition worsened and he later died in 2007. After his death, Gloria received a letter that William's inheritance was finalized and she received $50 million. The truth about John's "modification" to his own will was revealed, and the judge's previous decision was overruled. Gloria received half of John's billion dollar fortune and she quickly went from rags to riches in no time at all. She threw an extravagant memorial service for William at the Genoa City Athletic Club, and William's twin brother, Jeffrey Bardwell (also played by Ted Shackelford), arrived for the service.

Jeffrey came to Genoa City, intent on getting his brother's money. When he discovered Gloria's secret about the skin cream scandal, he blackmailed her into marrying him. Gloria and Jeffrey moved back into the Abbott Mansion, but Jack and his then-wife, Sharon Abbott (Sharon Case), were also living there. The two couples shared the mansion but both intended on keeping it for themselves. With Jeffrey's help, Jack hired Alistair Wallingford (Jerry Douglas) to haunt Gloria due to his uncanny resemblance to John Abbott. In the end, Jack felt guilty and he and Sharon moved out of the mansion. Gloria felt guilty and she gave the mansion back to Jack. Gloria and Jeffrey moved into the Abbott pool house. While there, they admitted their feelings for each other and they had sex. Suddenly, Jeffrey filed for divorce, including half of Gloria's net worth, because they couldn't agree on her finances. Meanwhile, Gloria decided to donate half of her net worth to the Marksalogria Charitable Foundation. "Marksalogria" was an anagram for "Gloria's Karma." When she and Jeffrey were divorced in 2008, he received the other half of her fortune. Gloria was then left without a penny to her name. Gloria tried to find a stable job, but when Jeffrey saw how his ex-wife was living, he reconciled with her. Jeffrey also felt guilty about stealing Gloria's diamonds before their divorce.

Jill Abbott wanted Jeffrey, but when he chose Gloria, she made Gloria her slave at Jabot, where Gloria was a receptionist. Jeffrey and Gloria eloped in Las Vegas, Nevada with Little Richard officiating the ceremony in 2008. Upon their return, Jill fired Gloria from Jabot. Kevin and his fiancée, Jana Hawkes (Emily O'Brien), decided to get married at an ashram in Malibu, California. In a turn of events, the guru who officiated the ceremony was Michael's father, Lowell Baldwin. While living on the run, Lowell changed his name to River Baldwin. Michael investigated his father in the past and he knew that he was a wanted criminal. Still, he and Gloria vowed not to turn him in. When River came to Genoa City to apologize, Gloria and Michael forgave him but Jeffrey turned him in to the FBI out of jealousy. Michael worked to clear his father's name but Gloria's damage from the past was coming back to haunt her. She pretended to be someone else and she called Lowell the "ringleader" of their activist group. When Michael found out that Gloria incriminated Lowell, she confessed and she apologized to Lowell, stating that she was only trying to protect baby Michael. Gloria testified for Lowell, against Jeffrey's wishes. Lowell was then released from prison, which infuriated Jeffrey.

Shortly after, Gloria and Jeffrey wanted to take over Jabot. She conned Katherine Chancellor into giving her shares of Jabot stock in her will. Gloria and Jeffrey set up a company called Agreeing Lovers, to buy more shares. Agreeing Lovers was an anagram for "Gloria's Revenge." The four Abbott children united with Gloria and when Katherine Chancellor suddenly died, Gloria and the Abbotts once again had controlling interest in Jabot. Jeffrey was still angry that Gloria testified for River and he burned himself with the tainted skin cream in order to incriminate Gloria. She was sent to jail and she met Marge Cotrooke, Katherine's doppelganger. Marge was really Katherine and she tried to convince Gloria about her true identity had actually died. Katherine was in jail and everyone thought that she was Marge. Kevin discovered the truth and soon everyone found out that Katherine was really alive. Everyone began to focus on Gloria's shares of Jabot. Jeffrey visited Gloria in jail to tell her that he wanted a divorce. In the end, Victor Newman (Eric Braeden) bought Gloria's shares and he transferred her payment into an offshore account. Michael cleared Gloria's name when he proved that the woman who supposedly died from the skin cream had a previous medical condition. Gloria was released from jail and she found Jeffrey in bed with Jill. She signed off on their divorce papers and she never wanted to see him again. To make matters worse, River left town when Michael discovered that he stole millions of dollars from a bank located near the bombing in the 1960s, and Kevin was admitted to a mental institution.

Still, Gloria was not off the hook. She was sued in a civil suit against Jabot for the financial damage of her skin cream tainting. Jabot received a large sum of money in the settlement and Jeffrey revealed that he only divorced Gloria to protect her assets. Katherine and Jill joined forces with Gloria and Jeffrey against Victor Newman. When Gloria and Jill discovered that the bank holding the money from the sale of the Jabot stock had gone under, they rushed to the bank to get their money. Victor sped up the demolition process, and Gloria, Jill, and Jeffrey were trapped inside. Fortunately, Jack rescued them in time, but Gloria and Jeffrey came home without a penny to their name. They moved out of the Genoa City Athletic Club into Phyllis Newman's (Michelle Stafford) penthouse apartment suite. Gloria and Jeffrey wanted Victor to pay them back for stealing their money and they exploited Colleen Carlton (Tammin Sursok) as part of Victor's dirty work. Gloria and Jeffrey used Patty Williams (Stacy Haiduk) to further sabotage Victor. They took Patty hostage in order to receive a ransom payment from Victor and Jack Abbott. In the end, Gloria and Jeffrey opened two suitcases that they believed had millions of dollars inside, but instead, blue dye exploded in their faces. Intent on giving up her life of trickery, Deacon Sharpe (Sean Kanan) offered Gloria $5 million if she retrieved an original Terroni painting for him. He used Gloria because "Terrible Tom" stole the original painting and it was in his safety deposit box. In the end, Daniel Romalotti (Michael Graziadei) returned the painting to the museum.

Gloria's luck finally turned around when Billy Abbott (Billy Miller) exposed Victor Newman in his magazine, Restless Style, regarding the death of his niece, Colleen Carlton. The SEC discovered Victor's involvement in the destruction of the bank that held Gloria's money. She and Jeffrey were then repaid the money that they made from the sale of their Jabot stocks and the Bardwells were rolling in the dough once again. Gloria then teamed up with Jack to maintain control of Jabot but Victor Newman bought the company from them. He hired Gloria as Jabot Ambassadress to spite Jack. Phyllis kicked Gloria and Jeffrey out of her penthouse apartment and Neil Winters (Kristoff St. John) decided to sell his nightclub Indigo to Jeffrey. He gave the club to Gloria as an anniversary gift, even though they were still divorced. Gloria renamed the club Gloworm, and she held its grand opening in 2010 with Jeffrey as her date. Soon after, Gloria found out that Jeffrey was laundering money out of Gloworm to run his own gambling operation. Gloria forced Jeffrey to work to pay back Gloworm, but she forgave him. She bought him the title of Count for Valentine's Day in 2010.

Gloria became upset when Kevin's ex-wife, Jana, began stalking her son. She teamed up with Kevin's friend, Chloe Mitchell (Elizabeth Hendrickson), and they broke into Jana's apartment. They were arrested for trespassing, but the charges were soon dropped. In addition, Gloria became a real estate agent and she sold her first house to her former stepson, Billy Abbott, and his new wife, Victoria Newman (Amelia Heinle). Still, Jeffrey was stressed because he had no way to pay back the people involved in his gambling business. Eventually, mobster Angelo Veneziano (Mike Starr) began to threaten Jeffrey. Soon after, Jeffrey scrounged up enough money to pay the mob by draining Gloworm's bank account. He left Gloria for Las Vegas, Nevada in 2011. With no money to run her beloved club, Gloria began to romance Angelo to keep her business afloat. He gave Gloria money in exchange for becoming a business partner for Gloworm. Angelo's daughter, Angelina Veneziano (Diana DeGarmo), began to pursue Kevin, but he was engaged to Chloe Mitchell. In 2012, Kevin left Chloe at the altar when he was tricked by Angelina. While "on the run," Angelo hired one of his henchmen to kill Kevin, and Gloria believed that he was leading the search to find him. Kevin and Angelina returned to Genoa City as a married couple, and at the same time, Jeffrey returned from "Las Vegas." He had amnesia and he could not remember who Gloria was. Gloria was furious with Jeffrey for stealing all of her money and she ran into Angelo's arms, having no idea that he almost murdered Kevin. However, Jeffrey later regains his memory but is later bound and gagged in an alley outside of Gloworm no thanks to Angelo, who intends to run off and marry Gloria. With some help from Jill, Jeffrey is freed and goes on to crash Angelo and Gloria's wedding, explaining to her that not only did Angelo kidnap him but that he was the one who stole her money. Jeffrey and Gloria married; however, during the wedding, Chelsea Lawson stormed into the room and announced Jeffrey as her father. Jeffrey denied it as Anita snuck out.

On December 21, 2016, after over a year offscreen, Gloria returned to celebrate Christmas with her family. It didn't take long for Gloria to lash out at Chloe for dating her son Kevin again. She also offended Esther Valentine (Kate Linder) as she tried to defend her daughter. Michael and Kevin try to keep her in check. Gloria reveals that she has once again left Jeffrey and never wants to hear his name again. It is revealed that Jeffrey spent all of Gloria's money and she is now broke. As a result of this, Gloria asks Lauren for a job at Fenmores, which is struggling. After Lauren refuses, Gloria betrays her by telling Jack that she'll help him gain control of Fenmores, with the stipulation that she gains a "small role" in running the company. She then tricks multiple investors into not investing in Fenmores so that Jack will be Lauren's only option. Jack ends up acquiring 49% of Fenmores. Gloria then goes to Jack to cash in the job promise, but is turned away and told she cannot and will not be offered a position. Gloria and Jack later end up drinking together, eventually having sex. Gloria attempts to disguise this incident as sexual assault on gossip show GC Buzz and tries using it to blackmail Jack into giving her some sort of compensation. Jack ends up giving Gloria a job as his executive assistant, which Gloria accepts reluctantly, as she had hoped for a more important job title. Jack and Gloria soon become friends with benefits but Jack calls it off after it begins to interfere with their working relationship and his personal life. Jack and Gloria still remain friends and often get involved in each other's personal business. Gloria continues to work as Jabots executive assistant when former son in-law Billy Abbott becomes CEO. However Gloria is replaced by newcomer Ted when Ashley Abbott takes over in mid October.

== Reception ==
In 2022, Charlie Mason from Soaps She Knows placed Gloria 25th on his list of the best 25 characters from The Young and the Restless, writing that "Somewhere, Bette Davis is gnashing her teeth over the fact that she never got to play Michael and Kevin's mother — and Joan Van Ark is facepalming, having abandoned the role of the femme fatale whose sex appeal is second only to her wicked wit."
