= Chelsea Lawson =

- The Young and the Restless character
- Portrayed by: Melissa Claire Egan
- Duration: 2011–present
- First appearance: November 11, 2011
- Created by: Maria Arena Bell, Hogan Sheffer and Scott Hamner
- Introduced by: Maria Arena Bell (2011); Anthony Morina and Josh Griffith (2019)
In-universe information
- Other names: Alexandra West; Andi West; Chelsea Boudreau; Chelsea McAvoy; Chelsea Newman; Joan Archdale
- Occupation: Hotelier (2019); Businesswoman; Fashion designer; Con-woman
- Father: Jeffrey Bardwell
- Mother: Anita Lawson
- Stepparents: Gloria Abbott Bardwell (2008–2009, 2012–2016)
- Husband: Adam Newman (2012–2013, 2014–2016); Dylan McAvoy (2013); Calvin Boudreau (?–2019)
- Sons: Johnny Abbott; Connor Newman
- Uncles: William Bardwell

Chelsea Lawson is a fictional character from The Young and the Restless, an American soap opera on the CBS network. Portrayed by Melissa Claire Egan, she was created by former head writer Maria Arena Bell and made her debut during the episode airing on November 11, 2011. Egan was said to be joining the soap opera as a mystery woman involved with Billy Abbott (Billy Miller).

Introduced as a con artist and "bad girl", Chelsea developed into a loving person. She arrived in town revealing that she had become pregnant with Billy's child, later giving up all her parental rights. She then began a romance with Adam Newman (Michael Muhney) which has garnered significant fan attention. Egan's portrayal has garnered a positive response, for which she received Daytime Emmy Award nominations in 2013, 2014, and 2021.

== Casting ==
In October 2011, it was announced that actress Melissa Claire Egan, previously known for her role as Annie Lavery on ABC's All My Children, had been cast in a contract role named Chelsea. Egan's character was to be "a mysterious woman named Chelsea who is connected to Billy’s arrest in Myanmar". On the topic of Egan working with her former co-star Billy Miller, the actress said: "We are buds from way back, of course, from our days on All My Children, and so we have been hanging out even before I came to Y&R. Now being here with Billy I get to see him double." Egan debuted on November 11, 2011.

In January 2018, Daytime Confidential reported that Egan had decided not to renew her deal with the serial and would soon vacate the role. However, the door would be left open for the actress to return. The following day, Egan announced her decision to leave the serial, citing it as a "goodbye for now" on her social media. Egan departed on March 2, 2018, episode. In April 2019, Entertainment Weekly announced that Egan would reprise her role as Chelsea. She began filming in May, and Chelsea returned at the conclusion of the June 28, 2019, episode.

== Development ==
=== Characterization ===
Chelsea was originally portrayed as a con artist and bad girl. Egan said that she "knew some people hate her", and she finds Chelsea "fun because she's a con artist". Catherine Bach was cast in the role of Anita Lawson, Chelsea's mother, to "play a vital role in Egan's character storyline". Egan said that "you see where Chelsea gets it from because her mom is a con artist, but way worse than Chelsea", and that "Chelsea has more of a conscience than Anita". Jeffrey Bardwell (Ted Shackelford) was then revealed as Chelsea's father, after which Egan said "it came out of nowhere", though "it’s great to have so many people to be intertwined with, if you will." On the topic of her character's personality, the actress said: "The viewers met Chelsea as a schemester and pregnant with child. She did not have any friends. And now, you will be able to see her personality. We can see her finally in some hot clothes, maybe a skirt, and high heels. She is no longer the beached whale at the bar." In an interview in 2013, Egan stated that she thought Chelsea had "certainly evolved a lot", saying: "Well she’s certainly evolved a lot; I mean she’s done a complete 180 as far as her intentions are. When I started, like you said, she was kind of a con artist, and manipulative, and doing things for money, and you know – completely, kind of not a very good person. But since then, she’s fallen in love, she’s gotten married – she’s gotten divorced! –and experienced life, its highs and lows and ups and downs and learned about family she didn’t know she had. She’s gotten closer to certain members of her family and gained friendships. I don’t think Chelsea was someone who had girlfriends before when she was on the road and cons don’t really have good relationships. So she’s just a better person; a better human being. She’s kind of lived life a little bit and definitely become more of a genuine, well-rounded person."

=== Relationships ===
After giving birth to Billy's baby, Chelsea's next love interest was Adam Newman (Michael Muhney). On the topic of working with Muhney, Egan said: "I love working with Michael. I heard about him because my mom had watched Y&R before I joined. So when I told her my character was going to be mixed-up with Adam, she went, 'Oh! He is so good, but so bad'". Egan noted that her mother "told me he was a great character, but an evil one, so I was really excited. And now knowing Michael, it has been so much fun." She said that "everyone seems to think we have good on-screen chemistry" and that "it’s an interesting energy between Chelsea and Adam being the "bad guys" in town." Egan said that through Chelsea having Billy's baby and giving him up, Adam was her biggest support. The pair eventually married.

However, trouble arose following Chelsea's miscarriage of their child and Adam's ex-wife Sharon Newman (Sharon Case) re-entering his life. Muhney was glad that Chelsea had a miscarriage because he did not want to work with young children, saying they have "strange hours". Adam felt responsible for Sharon being diagnosed with bipolar disorder, because of all of the hurt he caused her in their relationship. He even tried to cover up Sharon burning down Victor Newman's (Eric Braeden) home, working under the law to do so. Chelsea became outraged at him, creating cracks in their marriage; she warned a fragile Sharon to stay away. While telling Chelsea he wasn't attracted to Sharon, Adam later kisses her, which is witnessed by Chelsea. Egan stated it was "devastating" to Chelsea to realize that Adam was still in love with Sharon. After the couple divorced due to Adam's inability to abandon his corporate life, Egan stated that she was sad to see Chelsea and Adam breaking up, but was excited for the material as an actress. When asked if Chelsea or Sharon was Adam's "true love", Muhney stated: "It’s this back and forth. And if anyone has noticed since I have been on the show, I like to play as much ambiguity in scenes as possible, because then you keep the audience guessing."

After Chelsea's separation from Adam, she discovered she was pregnant with his child, but was hesitant to tell him. Of the storyline, Egan said: "Chelsea’s just really scared that she’s seen this other side that she’s been hearing so much about – the manipulative, Newman side to Adam, and she’s scared he’ll take the baby." After sharing a one-night stand with Dylan McAvoy (Steve Burton), Chelsea decides to pass Adam's child off as Dylan's, and the two are later married. Egan described the character's decision to keep the child's paternity a secret as a "ticking time bomb". Burton stated that Dylan is "not the sharpest tool in the shed", as he was believing what Chelsea was telling him. When asked about the child, Burton said: "This kid is everything to him, so once we figure out whose it is, if it’s not his, it’s not going to be a good situation for anybody." When asked if Dylan could forgive Chelsea, Burton added: "That’s a tough one. I don’t know what kind of mental state this is going to put Dylan in, to even think about that."

=== Rivalries and friendships ===
Chelsea is known for her rivalry with Sharon Newman, when Sharon began re-entering Adam's life after she had a mental breakdown and burned down the Newman ranch. Adam had an arsonist set fire to another building to avoid Sharon being implicated for the fire at the ranch. The arsonist burned down a restaurant owned by Chelsea's father. Chelsea became insecure and bitter towards Sharon, and was enraged at Adam for breaking the law to save Sharon. Chelsea warned Sharon to stay away from Adam; Sharon told her that Adam would never love Chelsea the way he loves her. Luke Kerr of Zap2It said that Chelsea was "out of her league" and the storyline was "fun".

== Storylines ==
When Billy Abbott (Billy Miller) was in Myanmar and away from his family, he met Chelsea at a beach bar where she was working. After returning home after being arrested there, Billy enlists the help of Cane Ashby (Daniel Goddard) to go to Myanmar and find Chelsea to help prove his innocence. Cane talks to a woman at a bar, and unbeknownst to him, the woman was actually Chelsea but she disappears before she can talk to him. Two months later, Chelsea shows up on Billy and his wife Victoria’s (Amelia Heinle) doorstep looking for "Liam", an alias Billy used. She reveals she is pregnant with his son after he forced himself onto her while intoxicated, and a DNA test proves that Billy is actually the father. Afterward, Billy secretly records Chelsea admitting that their one night stand was consensual and that her rape claim was a con she used against tourists. After Chelsea moves in with Billy and Victoria, Chelsea's mother Anita Lawson (Catherine Bach) arrives in town, creating conflict. Billy and Victoria later learn that Victoria's father, Victor Newman (Eric Braeden) brought both Chelsea and Anita to town to thwart his daughter's marriage.

Chelsea later discovers that Jeffrey Bardwell (Ted Shackelford) is her father and confronts him; a paternity test is conducted proving Chelsea's accusations, but Jeffrey attempts to make everyone believe that his deceased twin brother William was her father. Chelsea then befriends Adam Newman (Michael Muhney), and although he tells her he isn’t good enough for her, she persists and they form a friendship, even after Victoria's warnings. After Victoria finds Chelsea having had dinner with Adam, she storms off and falls into a frozen lake; Adam rescues her and ends up delivering her baby, a son named John Robert Abbott IV. After the birth of Johnny, Chelsea terminates all of her parental rights and allows Billy to raise the child with Victoria. After declining Victor's offer of $10 million to leave town, she moves in with Adam and develops their relationship; he helps study for exams to receive a high school diploma, and while Adam's feelings for her are unmet, he proposes to her in the rain and she accepts. They decide to elope to Adam's childhood home in Kansas (where Sharon unsuccessfully attempts to stop the wedding), and return home to join in a business venture with Chloe Mitchell (Elizabeth Hendrickson) and Kevin Fisher (Greg Rikaart), a website called TagNGrab. Chelsea then becomes pregnant and while leaving town on a trip, their car crashes with that of Summer Newman (Hunter King), causing Chelsea to miscarry her son, who she named Riley.

Adam then helps nurse his ex-wife, Sharon Newman (Sharon Case), back to health after feeling responsible for her bad mental state. Chelsea suspects that Adam still has feelings for her, and considers leaving him after witnessing them kiss. Adam then promises Chelsea they can move to Paris, but because of his inability to abandon his corporate life at Newman Enterprises, she leaves him and asks for a divorce. After their separation, Chelsea discovers she is pregnant with Adam's child, and while attempting to tell him on several occasions, her new friend Chloe convinces her not to do so. Chelsea and Chloe later start a fashion business, which is picked up by Jabot Cosmetics. After sharing a one-night stand with Dylan McAvoy (Steve Burton), Chloe convinces Chelsea to pass the child off as Dylan's, despite Adam's suspicions. After Chelsea moves in with Dylan, he proposes and she accepts, and later has to pay off Jeffrey to keep his mouth shut about the child's true paternity. After their wedding, Chelsea goes into labor and Dylan delivers her child, a son named Connor McAvoy. Soon after Connor's birth the truth about Adam being his father comes out after finding out he'll go blind from eye disease. Adam is furious with her and wanted to sue for full custody, but on the advice of Avery didn't. Adam forced Chelsea and Connor to move in with him, and while there, she gets served with divorce papers by Dylan. She and Adam rekindle their relationship, however they keep running into bad luck. Chelsea eventually leaves town in 2018 with Connor.

In 2021 and 2022, Chelsea experienced several health episodes. She attempts to kill Sharon's husband, Rey, and thereafter ends of in an accident which leads to her being left in a wheelchair, unable to speak. She began having delusions about killing Adam, and inflicting pain on others. She was checked into a psych ward. Soon after, she became good friends with Rey, who managed to forgive her before his own death by car crash. In 2022, Chelsea informed Connor and Johnny of birthing Johnny, much to their dismay and that of Adam, Victoria, and Billy. Both children were unable to process this information, and lashed out against their biological mother. Soon thereafter, Chelsea experienced a major depressive episode, and became the centre of a depression storyline after having attempted suicide by jumping from the top floor of a hotel and being saved by Billy. The storyline marked the Young and the Restless' first portrayal of a suicide storyline. Chelsea is later checking into a psych ward by Billy and Sharon, and is released. Sharon, putting aside her differences with Chelsea, offers her refuge at the vacated apartment above Crimson Lights.

== Reception ==
"Egan imbues Chelsea with the perfect mix of vulnerability and spunk that makes her both linkable and sympathetic. You can't help but root for Chelsea in spite of the baby ruse, which is a testament to Egan's layered, committed performances."

— Soap Opera Digest on Egan's portrayal (2013)

Egan's portrayal of the role has garnered praise. Michael Fairman of On-Air On-Soaps wrote: "With so many stories yet to play out, the Y&R writers and producers are certainly ready to put it in the more than capable hands of Egan." The character's romance with Adam has received significant fan attention (who refer to them as "Chadam") as well as a positive response from critics; the website Daytime Confidential placed Adam and Chelsea number three on their "Top 10 Soap Opera Couples of 2012" list. They wrote: "The Young and the Restless made a smart move in pairing sexy grifters Adam Newman (Michael Muhney) and Chelsea Lawson (Melissa Claire Egan) in 2012. By building first a friendship, then a love affair for Chadam, Y&R managed to save Chelsea from becoming yet another boring, cookie cutter, lady psycho (Daisy, anyone?)" Luke Kerr of Zap2it felt that Chelsea was "out of her league" when competing against Sharon for Adam's attention, and thought the storyline was "fun". Kerr later wrote that of the possible pairing of Chelsea and Dylan: "I’m not sure what to think about the obvious Dylan and Chelsea chemistry test going on." The character's romance with Dylan has received a negative response, criticized for being "boring"; Kerr wrote that their storyline was "everyone’s favorite storyline for curing insomnia". Egan received Daytime Emmy Award nomination for Outstanding Supporting Actress in a Drama Series for her portrayal of Chelsea, in 2013 and 2014.
