= Kate Valentine =

Kate Valentine may refer to:

- Kate Spade (Katherine Noel Valentine Brosnahan Spade, 1962–2018), also known as Kate Valentine, American fashion designer and entrepreneur
- Kate Valentine, fictional true identity of character Chloe Mitchell in the soap opera The Young and the Restless
- Sister Kate Valentine, a fictional character in Japanese manga series Chrono Crusade
