= Angelina Veneziano =

Character from the CBS soap opera The Young and the Restless

- The Young and the Restless character
- Portrayed by: Diana DeGarmo
- Duration: 2011–12
- First appearance: October 31, 2011
- Last appearance: March 27, 2012
- Introduced by: Maria Arena Bell
In-universe information
- Occupation: Recording artist
- Father: Angelo Veneziano
- Husband: Kevin Fisher (2012)

Angelina Veneziano is a fictional character from the American CBS soap opera The Young and the Restless. She is portrayed by Diana DeGarmo, who is famed for being runner-up on the third season of the reality television competition American Idol. She was introduced by former executive producer and head writer Maria Arena Bell on October 31, 2011, as the daughter of mob boss Angelo Veneziano (Mike Starr). Angelina was described as a mob boss daughter and aspiring singer by Zap2it. DeGarmo described her as an over-the-top "jersey girl", and noted her flamboyant costumes and voice. The show's executive producer and head writer Maria Arena Bell offered DeGarmo the role of Veneziano after seeing her performance of Penny Pingleton in the musical production of Hairspray.

Originating from New Jersey, Angelina arrived in Genoa City, Wisconsin to be with her father Angelo. She also wanted to fulfill her new-found dreams of becoming a recording artist. Her father hired music producer Devon Hamilton (Bryton James) to create her music. However, it was soon evident that she lacked in talent. She developed a crush on Kevin Fisher (Greg Rikaart), which she takes to extreme heights, conning him into a short-lived marriage with the help of her father. Angelina eventually achieved her musical dream, having released a song entitled "Good Goodbye" which was written and produced by DeGarmo. The song was about how the character evolved into a better person when she left, and detailed her "emotional journey". DeGarmo said that she had finally gotten rid of her selfish ways and expressed this through music. After a five-month stint on the series, on March 27, 2012, Angelina left Genoa City to further pursue her music career in Los Angeles. Described as "mafia princess" and an alter ego, TV Guide credited her as being comedic relief for the daytime drama. However, Luke Kerr of Zap2it was not receptive of the character's Jersey Shore concept, criticizing the soap opera for it. DeGarmo likened Angelina's transformation to My Fair Lady.

== Casting ==
On September 12, 2011, it was announced that DeGarmo was to join the cast of The Young and the Restless in the contract role of "jersey girl" Angelina. DeGarmo is well known for placing second on the third season of the reality television competition, American Idol. After her departure from American Idol, she ventured into on-stage musicals. Upon Angelina's debut on the show, it was revealed that she would be romantically linked to Kevin Fisher (Greg Rikaart). According to Entertainment Weekly, "Angelina, wants to be a singer – but she's not exactly good at it." DeGarmo began filming scenes on September 22, with her first airdate being October 31, 2011. Speaking about how she landed the role of Angelina, DeGarmo said that she was doing a special performance of the musical Hairspray at the Hollywood Bowl for three nights that August, to which head writer Maria Arena Bell had attended. She stated:

[Bell] happened to come see it just as they were starting to look for Angelina, which is so not the kind of character role people think of me doing. First of all, I've changed so much. People know the little 16-year-old blonde from American Idol. Now I'm 24, and definitely not blonde anymore. I'm back to being au naturel, thank goodness! Everyone at Y&R has been so nice and welcoming, which is refreshing. As you know, the entertainment industry is not so sweet all the time

According to CBS Soaps In Depth DeGarmo said: "I'm definitely spicing things up! Angelina is getting into a bit of shenanigans and trouble along the way, just to make sure people are on their toes." Additionally, she noted that: "Angelina may have a little bit of a crush on Kevin and she is not afraid to show it." CBS Soaps In Depth wrote: "viewers definitely can expect Angelina to make her mark in Genoa City." DeGarmo confessed that she never watched daytime soap operas because she was in school, but her family was "super excited" about seeing her on one. Because she never had experience working on soaps, she talked about how fast-paced it was, stating: "I would equate this to guerrilla theater. It’s very fast. You do your presentation and you’re done. It keeps me on my toes. I have to give my best performance at that very moment." She also discussed having crossed over in the genre: "Sometimes being a ‘reality’ person can be a bit of a stigma. ‘The Young and the Restless’ was willing to take a chance on me. They are so fantastic."

== Development ==
=== Characterization ===
TV Guide introduced Angelina as: "the Jersey girl daughter of mob boss Angelo Veneziano (Mike Starr). She comes to Genoa City with dreams of being a chart-topping vocalist. And what Angelina wants, Angelina gets!" Fred Bronson of The Hollywood Reporter noted that DeGarmo already had experience of playing the part of a "Jersey Girl" because she had once starred in the musical The Toxic Avenger, which is set in New Jersey. Bronson also noted that she was having a fun time playing the part. Describing Angelina, DeGarmo labeled her as "over-the-top" and a "gum-smacking, tone-deaf princess whose hair is as large as her attitude." She said "I'm having a blast! Angelina believes she's Barbra Streisand mixed with Celine Dion." The character is described as an alter ego by DeGarmo. DeGarmo revealed that she was having a "blast" picking out costumes for the over-the-top part: "Her hair and make-up are icing on the cake" she stated. Additionally, she noted that "Angelina’s style has taken a few notes from the cast of Jersey Shore." Comparing Angelina to herself, she said: "There are some things that I, Diana, would be too terrified to walk out of the house wearing, but Angelina is not afraid." She is also described as a "mafia princess". DeGarmo said: "You never know what she's going to do, which keeps everyone on their toes. One minute she's nice, the next she snaps". According to DeGarmo, Angelina is fully aware that her father is a mob boss and: "she doesn't mind. She likes throwing around her weight at any time. She loves the perks of being a mob boss's daughter. She lives for it." Also, her character was probably based on Angela Viracco, in the 1985 movie The Last Dragon.

=== Music career ===
"[Angelina] is from Jersey. You can't just throw her in the south and expect her to sound like Dolly Parton. The great thing is we've been able to gradually transform this character, and it's going to be a great, huge, poignant moment for her and I think everyone is going to be really surprised."

— DeGarmo on how Angelina evolved

Angelina's dream is to be a successful singer on the music charts. DeGarmo noted that her father, Angelo, "who thinks his spoiled-brat daughter sings like a choir of angels" puts pressure on Devon Hamilton (Bryton James), a young and upcoming music producer, to show Angelina the ropes of the music industry and make her a success. DeGarmo said: "Unfortunately, she’s not as good a singer as she and her father think she is [sic] Angelina is a bit oblivious to reality, but will slowly come to grips with it over the next few weeks. As a singer myself, it’s liberating to get on the set and throw all ego – and notes – aside and surprise people." DeGarmo commented: "It's fantastically hilarious because it puts the poor kid in a horrible predicament!" She said that Angelina was into Top 40 music at first, but: "the writers have her singing the American standards — Judy Garland, that sort of thing. We want the audience to be really familiar with the songs, so they can tell how badly Angie is butchering them." Michael Logan of TV Guide noted that you needed "skill to play a bad singer", to which DeGarmo said that it's harder than people realize: "but it's really liberating to get out there and be bad. You just throw your ego to the wind and sing for Jesus." Devon would eventually go on to make Angelina a good singer. Angelina briefly fired Devon for adding rap verses to a song of hers which was soaring on the charts, but he retained the rights of the track.

As her time on the show was nearing its end, it was announced that DeGarmo was to debut a country ballad song entitled "Good Goodbye". Kelly Ballhorn of Ryanseacrest.com noted that: "Fans of 'Young and the Restless' and Diana have been waiting for her to sing on the show like she can in real life ... well, the wait’s over". "Good Goodbye" was co-written by DeGarmo and her real-life fiance Ace Young, who was also a competitor on American Idol, and details Angelina's "emotional journey" on the show. She was approached by the show's award-winning composer David Kurtz, and he asked her to make a song for Angelina. Rodney Ho of The Atlanta Journal-Constitution said: "It’s supposed to be a turning point to her character. Her character on the most part has been pushy and full of herself." During an interview with TV Guide, DeGarmo said that the song will "tug at your heartstrings" and marks a big turning point for Angelina's storyline: "where she's finally starting to grow up. She's coming to realize that she needs to get rid of her selfish ways. She doesn't know how to go about that like a normal person, so she does it through song."

=== Relationship with Kevin Fisher ===
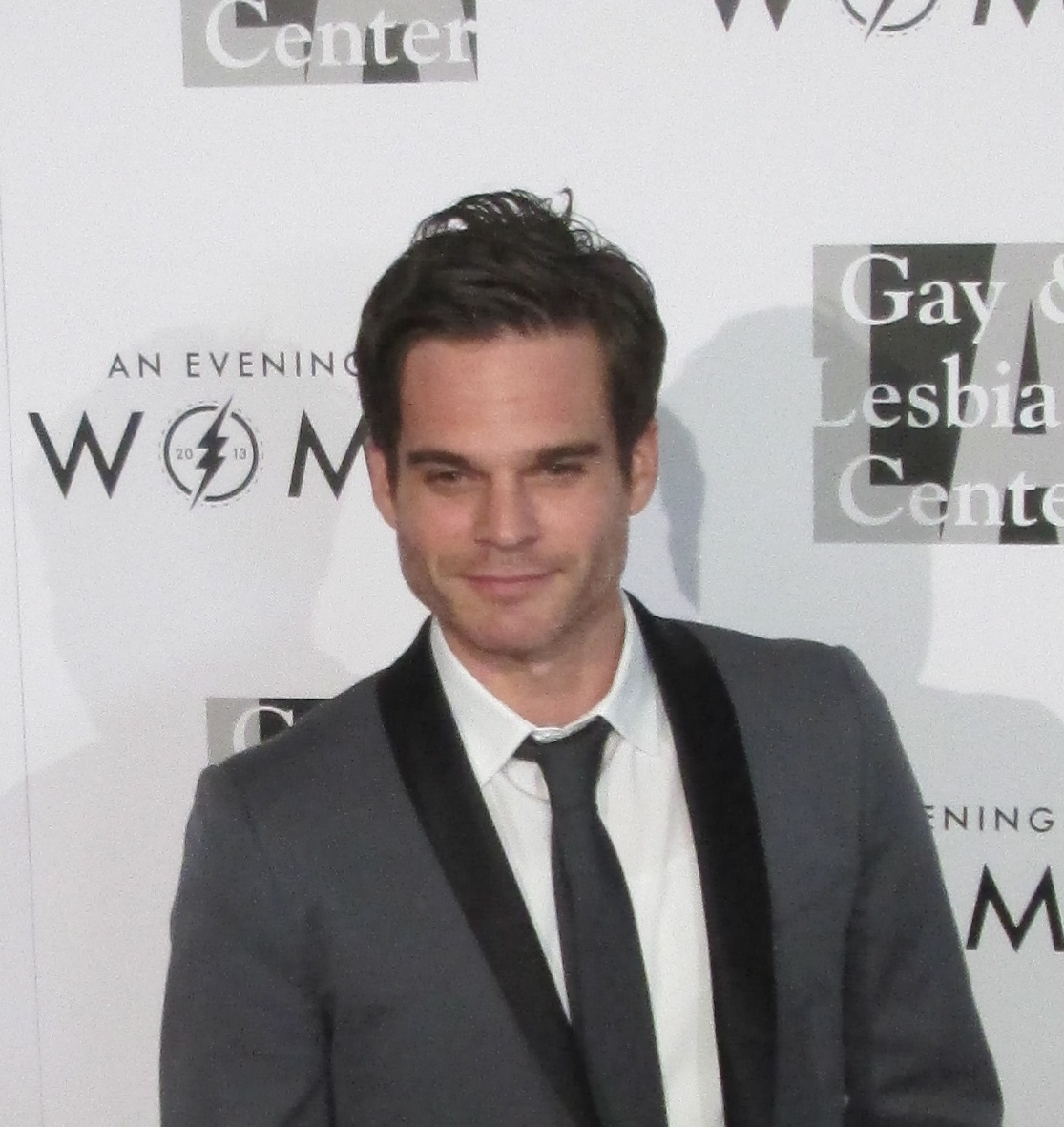
Greg Rikaart plays Kevin Fisher, Angelina's crush, who eventually becomes her husband.

When she first arrived in Genoa City, Angelina set her eyes on Kevin Fisher (Greg Rikaart), whom she developed a huge crush on. Of her crazy crush, DeGarmo said: "Ooh, she wants him bad! Angie has her eyes, her heart and her body set on landing Kevin — and it scares him to death." She said that Kevin was too sweet and nervous, and is weakened to Angelina's preying on him. "She loves seeing him squirm" DeGarmo stated. Of working with Rikaart, she said: "Greg and I can't stop laughing during our scenes together." During an interview with MSN, she stated: "I've had the great pleasure sharing the screen with Mr. Greg Rikaart. Angelina gets a little bit of a crush on Kevin, and she's not afraid not to show it. It's a blast, because she makes him incredibly nervous [sic] The sparks that fly on screen are just hilarious. It's wonderful to be a part of." Just before Kevin was set to marry his girlfriend Chloe Mitchell (Elizabeth Hendrickson), Angelina persuaded him to help her escape town, as she was in danger. They returned home safe.

Eventually, things got to the stage where Angelina's father forced Kevin to marry his daughter. Becca Badget of Yahoo! wrote: "Kevin keeps to himself that he married Angelina to avoid a bullet from Angelo's henchman. The guests are unaware that he married her to stay alive." While this happened, Kevin's mother Gloria Bardwell (Judith Chapman) was involved with Angelo, who had kidnapped and sent away her husband Jeffrey Bardwell (Ted Shackelford) to have Gloria for himself. On whether or not Kevin will ever love her, DeGarmo said: "I know she sure hopes so. She did try to get him to marry her." The relationship, however, ended when Angelina realizes that he never loved her. DeGarmo said: "Kevin does see the light inside Angelina, even though that light may be a little dim sometimes."

== Storylines ==
Angelina was introduced as Angelo's daughter who had a dream of becoming a successful recording artist. Angelo's girlfriend Gloria requested that music producer Devon should help her out, only for everyone to find out she had no talent. Angelina developed a crush on Gloria's son, Kevin Fisher, who was already engaged to his girlfriend Chloe. Angelina attempted to seduce Kevin, making Chloe hate her. Angelo put Kevin in charge of keeping Angelina safe from her dangerous ex-boyfriend Carmine Basco (Marco Dapper). Devon found out that Angelina sang well only if staring into Kevin's eyes. At Kevin and Chloe's wedding, Angelina told Kevin that she was pregnant with Carmine's child and that they needed to leave town immediately. Kevin ran away with her after shots were fired during the wedding ceremony.

They set out on a journey to get away from Carmine, first going to a hotel near Niagara Falls. Hearing of this, Angelo assumed that Kevin wanted to win over Angelina, and sent over his friend Dino to "break his legs". They fled to Angelo's fishing cabin on an island where a homeless man is living. It is later revealed to be Gloria's estranged husband Jeffrey who had been kidnapped and sent away by Angelo, but lost memory of it. Jeffrey stole their motor boat, leaving them stranded there. Angelina then finally revealed to Kevin that she was never pregnant and faked the ordeal so that he would fall in love with her. Dino arrives at the Island and nearly killed Kevin, but Angelina tells him he can't because she will be married to Kevin. Because of this, Kevin reluctantly had to marry her at a ceremony in Glowarm because Angelo forced him. Kevin was extremely miserable and told Chloe that the marriage was a sham.

Angelo told Kevin that he would hurt Chloe if he didn't devote himself wholeheartedly to Angelina. While at a bar at Jimmy's, Angelina revealed to him that she really does love him, and he admits to her that he doesn't, breaking her heart. The marriage ended and Angelina confessed to tricking Kevin into marrying her. They are officially divorced and she released a song entitled "Good Goodbye". She made sure that Chloe and Kevin get back together. She left Genoa City to further pursue her music career in Los Angeles, with Angelo as her manager. Moments after they leave, Angelina's infamous ex-boyfriend Carmine arrived and threatened that he is going to steal Chloe from Kevin because Kevin "stole" Angelina from him. Carmine ended up kidnapping Abby Newman (Marcy Rylan). Days after he kidnapped her, they ended up falling love and returned to Genoa City.

== Reception ==
The character's reception has been mixed. Upon DeGarmo joining the show, Luke Kerr of Zap2It was not receptive of the character's concept. He compared her to Snooki of the reality television series Jersey Shore and said that the show has fallen under Jersey Shore's "drunken spell". He wrote: "Regardless of who portrayed the character—because I have absolutely nothing against DeGarmo—why does Y&R need yet another big name stunt cast?" Additionally, he said: "every time I read something about the new character I find myself asking myself why, just why?" DeGarmo said: "Angelina nor I need to watch ‘Jersey Shore’ for pointers. But we are fans. Definitely Snooki is someone we look up to."

Before the character aired, Deanna Barnert of MSN TV said of DeGarmo: "The young songstress may even prove there's something more dangerous than a mob wife or a "Jersey Shore" diva: a mob daughter." Michael Logan of TV Guide praised DeGarmo and Angelina as comic relief for the show. Lynette Rice of Entertainment Weekly regarded Angelina as Angelo's ambitious "little angel" and called DeGarmo's casting as "not exactly the next Mariah Carey" a "bit of a twist". Lyndsey Parker of Yahoo! Music called her a: "gum-smacking mob princess with a heart of gold".

In 2012, writers from Soaps She Knows placed Angelina and Angelo as the worst characters of the soap of that year, writing that the characters "never fit the "Y&R" canvas and seemed like over-the-top cartoon characters compared to those they interacted with in their storylines. Angelina grew on some viewers a tad by the time she left, but on the whole, they just didn't work and haven't been missed". In 2021, Richard Simms from the same website put Angelina on his list of the most hated soap opera characters, calling her a "songbird whose mafioso pop forced Kevin Fisher to marry his talent-free daughter" and commenting that the audience were not very "thrilled" by the storyline.
