= Jana Hawkes =

Fictional character from the American CBS soap opera The Young and the Restless

- The Young and the Restless character
- Portrayed by: Emily O'Brien
- Duration: 2006–2011
- First appearance: May 11, 2006
- Last appearance: May 6, 2011
- Created by: Kay Alden, John F. Smith and Lynn Marie Latham
- Introduced by: John F. Smith
In-universe information
- Other names: Stella
- Occupation: Coffeehouse owner Art teacher Nanny
- Parents: Milan Hawkes; Hannah Hawkes
- Husband: Kevin Fisher (2008–10)
- Grandparents: Carl Hawkes; Jenny Hawkes

Jana Hawkes is a fictional character from the American CBS soap opera The Young and the Restless. The role was portrayed by Emily O'Brien, first on a recurring status and then on contract until the character's death onscreen on May 6, 2011. Jana was married to Kevin Fisher, is the murderer of Carmen Mesta, and was involved in a number of illegal activities. She died of an aneurysm during a fight with her ex-husband's girlfriend, Chloe Mitchell.

== Casting ==
O'Brien portrayed the role initially on a recurring status from May 11 to September 5, 2006, and then on contract from October 10, 2006 to February 20, 2007, when the character disappeared from the canvas temporarily until her return on June 15, 2007. In March 2011, news broke that O'Brien had been let go from The Young and the Restless, with her final airdate on May 6, 2011. Speaking of her exit, O'Brien revealed, "I was on a run and my manager called me to say I was let go. If someone could have taken a photograph of me, I would have looked like I had just been electrocuted. I was thinking all these things. How am I going to say goodbye to this incredible role?"

== Storylines ==
Jana Hawkes, a British woman with a mysterious past, came to Genoa City in 2006 and was hired as an employee at Kevin Fisher's coffee house, Crimson Lights. Jana soon bonded with Kevin and they began dating. Lauren Fenmore also gave Jana a job tending her infant son, Fenmore. Much of Jana's past was a mystery, and her reasons for moving to the United States were initially unclear.

Jana disappeared then, and Kevin suspected that Adrian Korbel was responsible for that and the murder of Newman Enterprises executive Carmen Mesta. After Colleen Carlton and Kevin were held hostage in a walk-in refrigerator, they discovered that Jana was responsible for their kidnappings and Carmen's murder. She and her father wanted the reliquary, a piece of Jewish artwork that was originally stolen by the Nazis during World War II and subsequently lost. To cover up their crimes, they planned to kill Kevin and Colleen by setting the building they were in on fire. Despite her love for him, Jana tried to make it look like Kevin was trying to kill Colleen again, as he had years before, and accidentally trapped himself in the process.

Jana disappeared, and the Grugeon Reliquary was turned over to foreign officials. Kevin and Colleen escaped with their lives. As Kevin recovered, Jana began contacting him. He used her feelings for him to lure her back to Genoa City. Once Jana returned, Kevin attempted to kill her, only to be stopped by Michael, Colleen, and Daniel. She was arrested for her crimes and began having seizures. It was revealed that Jana had a tumor in her brain, which may have caused her to become psychotic. After investigating the situation, Kevin forgave Jana for her actions and fell back in love with her. Kevin's mother Gloria Bardwell paid for the surgery to remove Jana's tumor. She was then found competent to stand trial and was sent to prison. Kevin convinced A.D.A. Heather Stevens to review Jana's case and she was released. Jana and Kevin eventually married.

Jana then got a job as an assistant to Victor Newman's fiancée, Sabrina Costelana Newman, at her art gallery. Jana was pleasantly surprised when Sabrina chose her to be her maid of honor. Sabrina and Jana had a good friendship until Sabrina's death a few months later. At Sabrina's deathbed, Jana was put in charge of planning the funeral.

Kevin and Jana shared a friendship with Daniel Romalotti and Amber Moore. The four supported each other during their romantic and legal troubles. They also became entangled in the problems of Kevin's mother and brother.

In 2010, Jana was taken hostage with Lauren and locked in a cage by Daisy Carter, Ryder Callahan, and Sarah Smythe. During the experience, Jana became sick and Ryder tried to help her, against Daisy and Sarah's orders. Kevin saved her life and let Ryder escape when he learned how kindly he treated Jana. However, she collapsed and was rushed to the hospital where she suffered an aneurysm. Jana underwent surgery which resulted in damage to the part of her brain that governed emotion. She remembered events and people she knew, but she seemingly lost all sense of feeling and emotion.

Jana took out a loan on Crimson Lights to get Ryder out of jail and began an affair with him, which devastated Kevin when he found them in bed together.

Jana saw Kevin out at the opening of his mother Gloria's nightclub Gloworm with Chloe Mitchell and apologized to him for what happened with Ryder. She also told him that she wanted to give their marriage another chance, but Kevin refused, still hurt over Jana cheating on him.

Jana also became jealous of Kevin and Chloe's friendship, fearing that it would become something more than it already was. She became even more jealous when she saw them posing for pictures at Crimson Lights with Chloe's daughter Delia. In order to keep an eye on them, Jana took a job as an art teacher at Delia's preschool. Soon after, she went out on a date with a grown-up Noah Newman, though in truth she was using him to make Kevin jealous. Upon Daisy's return to Genoa City, she was frightened but used this as an opportunity to get Kevin's attentions. Daisy's arrest caused Jana's plan to get Kevin's attention to fail.

On December 16, 2010, in the heat of the moment, Kevin, hurt over what he felt is Chloe's rejection, had sex with Jana. Later, while helping to organize a church recital which will have featured Kevin's nephew Fenmore, Gloria, who had not forgiven Jana for cheating on Kevin, told her to stay away from her son.

On New Year's Eve, Chloe told Kevin how she truly feels about him, and they kissed outside of Jimmy's Bar. Jana became angry and jealous over seeing them kiss and vowed to do whatever she could to get Kevin back. She even let Daisy, who was in labor, escape. Jana even went so far as to fake an injury & claim that Daisy attacked her in order to play on Kevin's sympathy. On Thursday January 5, 2011 it was said that Jana suffered a setback and now thought she and Kevin were still married. Later, it appeared to be all a part of Jana's scheme to win Kevin back. The plan proved to be a failure however because of Kevin's strong feelings for Chloe.

On Valentine's Day 2011, Kevin and Chloe, realizing quickly that they were being set up by Gloria and Katherine Chancellor, were locked in Gloria's office together at Gloworm. Jana caught them kissing. She claimed to have been worried about Kevin when he had not come home, but he made it clear to her that they were no longer together and told her not to worry about him anymore. Kevin closed the door, and Jana walked away, hurt over his rejection.

Kevin and Chloe later had sex for the first time in Gloria's office.

In March 2011, Jana, after moving out of Kevin's apartment, got a job as a nanny for Billy and Victoria Abbott. However, her former lover, Ryder Callahan, returned searching for his niece and tried to get Jana to tell him where the baby was, threatening to tell the police that Jana was the one who let Daisy escape. During his confrontation with Jana, however, he was unaware that Lucy, the baby Jana was holding, was none other than his niece.

Jana went undercover under the alias of "Stella" as a pregnant woman looking to make a deal with the baby broker, Primrose, in order to gain information about Daniel's baby. Jana's rouse is eventually discovered by Primrose, but not before Jana steals documents that eventually led Jana to realize that Lucy is Kevin's niece. She kidnapped both Delia and Lucy, and took Kevin hostage. Kevin eventually convinced Jana to return the children, leaving them in a church. Jana held Kevin at gunpoint, locking him in a closet for several days in an abandoned preschool. All the while, she was delusional in hoping that Kevin would love her as he once did.

On May 6, 2011, Jana called Chloe to come to the preschool without the police. When Chloe arrived, Jana was ready to shoot both of them. Kevin knocked the gun out of her hand, causing Jana and Chloe to struggle. Jana suffered another aneurysm and died. Although initially Kevin and Chloe are suspected of murdering Jana, autopsy results prove that Jana died of natural causes.

== Reception ==
For her role as Jana, O'Brien earned two Daytime Emmy Award nominations for Outstanding Younger Actress in 2008 and 2009. Prior to her 2011 firing, O'Brien was pre-nominated for another Daytime Emmy in the same category. Michael Fairman from Michael Fairman TV noted that fans "loved" O'Brien as "crazy" Jana, adding that there were "many twists and turns in their dark romantic storyline".
