= Chloe Mitchell =

Fictional character from The Young and the Restless

- The Young and the Restless character
- Elizabeth Hendrickson as Chloe Mitchell
- Portrayed by: Darla and Sandra Greer (1990–1991); Danielle Ryah (1994); Elizabeth Hendrickson (2008–present)
- Duration: 1990–1991; 1994; 2008–2017; 2019–present
- First appearance: July 27, 1990
- Created by: William J. Bell
- Introduced by: Edward J. Scott (1990, 1994); Josh Griffith (2008); Mal Young and Charles Pratt, Jr. (2016); Anthony Morina and Josh Griffith (2019)
In-universe information
- Other names: Katherine Tina Valentine; Chloe Ashby; Chloe Abbott; Chloe Fisher; Helen Jones; Chelsea Lawson; Dorothy Gale; Margaret Harris
- Occupation: Fashion stylist; Website designer; Fashion editor; Wedding planner; Fashion consultant; Model handler
- Parents: Tiny; Esther Valentine
- Spouse: Cane Ashby (2008–2009); Billy Abbott (2009); Kevin Fisher (2012–2014, 2014)
- Children: Delia Abbott; Bella Fisher; Miles Fisher

Chloe Mitchell is a fictional character from The Young and the Restless, an American soap opera on the CBS network. Introduced by former executive producer Edward J. Scott as the daughter of trusty Chancellor family maid, Esther Valentine (Kate Linder), the character was born onscreen on July 27, 1990. Portrayed by twins, Darla and Sandra Greer, until 1991, upon her brief return in 1994, child actress, Danielle Ryah, portrayed the role. On February 6, 2008, executive producer/head writer Josh Griffith introduced a new character, Chloe Mitchell, played by former All My Children actress, Elizabeth Hendrickson. That August, a change in storyline revealed Chloe was Kate, having legally changed her name while offscreen, when the character was away in boarding school. Upgraded from recurring to contract status, Hendrickson became an integral part of the cast.

Immediately upon her arrival on the show, Chloe was characterized as a manipulative "bad girl" by Soap Opera Digest. Hendrickson expressed pleasure in portraying a vixen, stating that it was her idea to make the character "edgy and funny" instead of "some girl who was putting on fancy clothes". Chloe is first hired as a fashion consultant at Jabot Cosmetics by Cane Ashby (Daniel Goddard), whom she develops an attraction for. She breaks up Cane's relationship with his girlfriend, Lily Winters, (Christel Khalil) by announcing that she is pregnant with his child. Upon the birth of her daughter Cordelia "Delia" Abbott (Sophie Pollono) the truth is revealed: Billy Abbott (Billy Miller) fathered the child, not Cane. After brief marriages to Cane and then Billy, Chloe begins an unsuccessful streak of relationships with men including Chance Chancellor (John Driscoll), Ronan Malloy (Jeff Branson), and most recently Kevin Fisher (Greg Rikaart). Other storylines the character encountered included Delia facing leukemia in 2011, and later when she was killed in a hit and run accident in 2013.

Despite temporarily breaking up the popular pairing of Lily and Cane, Chloe was met with popularity among viewers and critics. Soap Opera Weekly described the character as "complex" and her storyline "meaty". Nelson Branco of TV Guide hailed Chloe as "one of the most legendary bitches in soap history", crediting her for rejuvenating the "dying breed" of soap opera vixens. The character's various relationships have been met with mixed reviews. While the pairing of Chloe and Billy has been popular, Sara Bibel of Xfinity heavily criticized the romance between Chloe and Chance for mellowing the character out, wanting the "sassy" Chloe back. While Chloe and Kevin were initially met with favorable reviews, Zap2it placed them on a list of "Worst Soap Opera Couples" and said that the soap opera "needs to put a fork in this relationship". Hendrickson's performance has been met with critical acclaim, having garnered her four Daytime Emmy Award nominations for Outstanding Supporting Actress in a Drama Series in 2012, 2014, 2015 and 2018. After six years in the role, Hendrickson chose to leave The Young and the Restless in 2014, returning for two brief guest stints thereafter. She later returned as a series regular from 2016 to 2017. Hendrickson briefly reprised the role in June 2019 and permanently since August 23, 2019.

== Casting ==
Katherine Tina Valentine was introduced by former executive producer Edward J. Scott, born onscreen during the episode that aired July 27, 1990. She was portrayed by twins Darla and Sandra Greer from 1990 to 1991, with child actress Danielle Ryah taking over the role briefly in 1994. Upon the character's re-introduction as an adult by executive producer Josh Griffith on February 6, 2008, actress Elizabeth Hendrickson assumed the role. Hendrickson was previously known for her role as Maggie Stone on All My Children, one half of the iconic Bianca Montgomery and Maggie Stone lesbian supercouple. Having been offered the part in 2007 as a ten-episode guest stint, she was soon promoted to a contract status. Reflecting on her casting, Hendrickson described the process as a "lovely surprise" and said, "I used to always watch Y&R when I was on AMC. I always liked the look and feel of the show, so I’ve always been a big fan. Chloe wasn’t even on the page when I came in for a chemistry audition." As a result of the character's positive response, co-executive producer and head writer Maria Arena Bell decided to write Chloe's backstory which revealed her to be the daughter of long-running character Esther Valentine (Kate Linder) while also providing her with additional storyline. "Everyone is so pleasant here and it's such a great, warm environment and it just feels really right. If they ask me to stay that would be a blessing," Hendrickson said, before being offered a contract. In March 2014, following increased speculation, Hendrickson confirmed her exit from the series, stating: "I need to stretch my wings and fly into the unknown. The one thing that remains true and what I will hold close to my heart as I embark on this new adventure is that I will ALWAYS have you." She made her last appearance on May 27, 2014. Hendrickson reprised the role for one episode on October 14, 2014 to commemorate the passing of Chloe's daughter, Delia. In October 2015, Hendrickson also reprised the role of Chloe from October 12 to 28.

In May 2016, Daytime Confidential revealed that Hendrickson will reprise the role of Chloe as a series regular. She returned on July 14, 2016. In March 2017, the website reported that Hendrickson had been taken off contract and the character was to be written out. However, it was said that Hendrickson could stick around on a recurring basis. In May 2017, Hendrickson announced she was leaving the serial. Hendrickson last aired on July 18, 2017, alongside Greg Rikaart's Kevin Fisher.

In May 2019, it was reported that Hendrickson would reprise the role once again; she returned for a two-episode guest stint on June 27 and 28, and on recurring status beginning August 23.

== Character development ==
=== Characterization ===
Chloe is characterized as a "dynamic fashion guru" by Global BC and a "bad girl" by Soap Opera Digest. Hendrickson expressed her happiness in playing a "manipulative" character who takes advantage of people. She said, "I get to play, not only this edgy, spicy kind of character, but she's actually pretty funny too, so it's nice to bring some humor into it as well." Chloe is a "bitchy" stylist who is hired at Jabot Cosmetics as a fashion consultant. Explaining her initial portrayal of Chloe, Hendrickson stated, "I was the one who wanted to make her edgy and funny. Most of the people I know who are in the fashion business are a little bitchy. I wanted to make Chloe interesting, instead of just playing her like some girl who was putting on fancy clothes. There was no conflict there. The writers definitely gave me that in the writing, and I tweaked it a little. They seemed to enjoy it. Each day, Chloe kept getting funnier and bitchier." She first works with young model Lily Winters (Christel Khalil), the new face of Jabot whom she treats harshly. According to Hendrickson, Chloe "takes her job very seriously. [She] is used to working with more professional models and is very hard on Lily regarding, you know, keeping up some sort of appearance if you will, regarding the fashion industry, which is weight. So [Chloe] starts to give [Lily] a little weight complex because she is constantly throwing in her face that either she doesn't fit into things or they have to make things larger for her, etc."

=== Chloe is Kate ===
"I think that what happened was that they created Chloe not really sure who she was going to be and what she was going to be doing. Then, I think they wanted to keep her around – thank you, writers! And the best way to keep someone around is to attach them to a family member, and I think that’s just what they came up with."

— Hendrickson, on why the writers decided to make Chloe the daughter of Kate Linder's character Esther Valentine (2012)

As her story progresses following her constant manipulative behavior, Chloe reveals her true identity: Kate Valentine, the daughter of the Chancellor maid Esther Valentine (Kate Linder). The storyline was dubbed "Chloe is Kate". Hendrickson was pleased that the writers decided to give Chloe a backstory, saying, "I was so excited when I found out Chloe was going to have some family ties. I knew it would give me, as an actor, a chance to finally explain to viewers why Chloe is the way she is." The actress felt that her family reveal proved that she's not "this bitch who likes to destroy people's lives", attesting her behavior to not being raised by parents; "She never had anyone tell her wrong from right," Hendrickson stated. Her backstory revealed that Chloe hadn't seen her mother or her employer Katherine Chancellor (Jeanne Cooper) and Jill Abbott (Jess Walton) since she "was young and overweight with braces". Kate Linder was also pleased with the writing direction, describing it as an "honor" to work with Hendrickson. She said, "When they decided to bring [Chloe] back, I was stunned and pleasantly surprised. Maria Bell called me and told me that it was top secret. It was a great reveal." Chloe initially gives Esther the cold shoulder. Of her reasoning behind this, Hendrickson said, "Chloe is very young and immature — as well, hurt and ashamed about her upbringing. She’s not going to let her mother forget it easily." She described their initial relationship as "realistic" and similar to "a lot of mother-and-daughter relationships".

=== Relationships ===
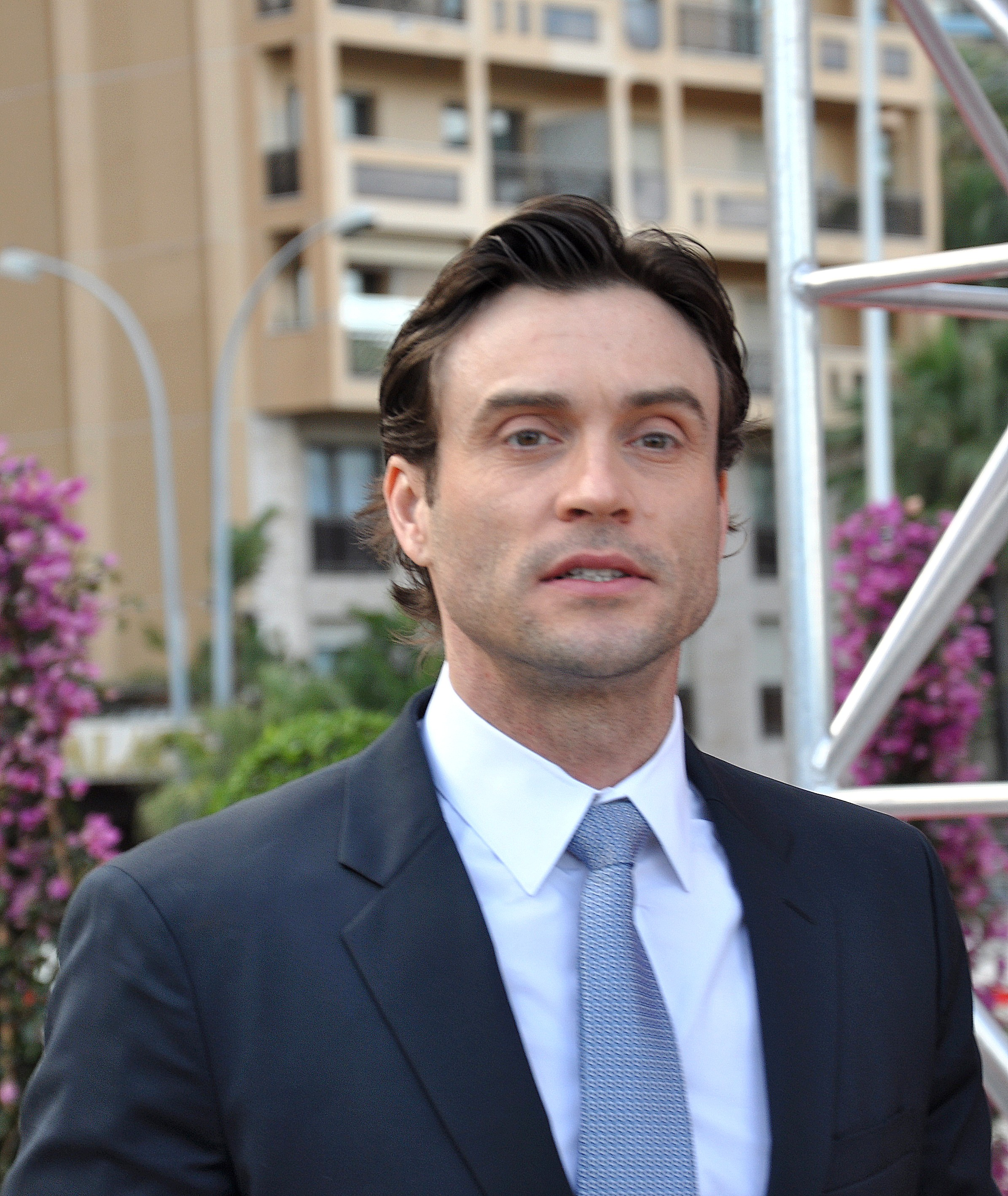
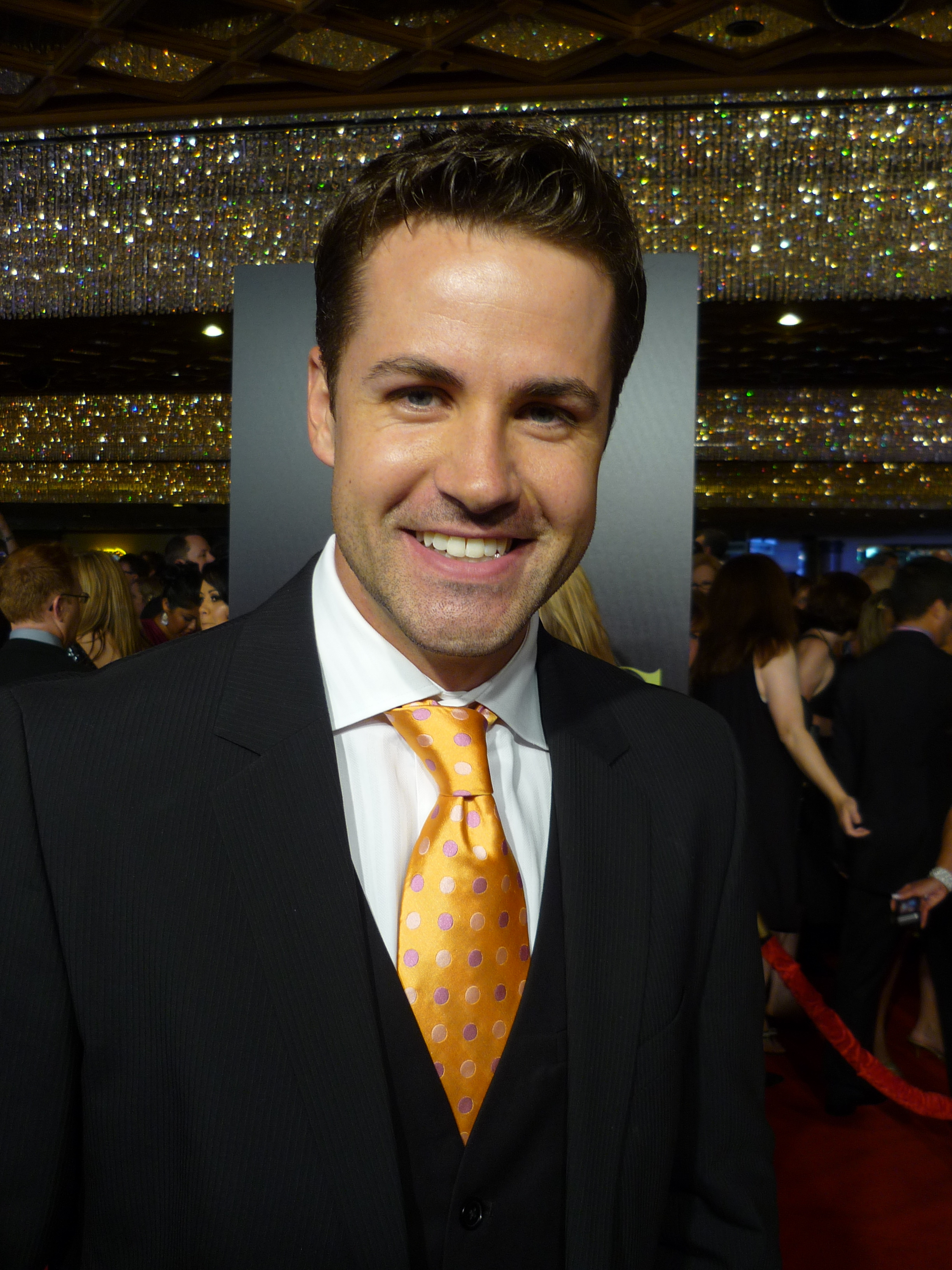
Daniel Goddard (left) portrays Cane Ashby, Chloe's first love interest whom she manipulates into marriage; Hendrickson compared their relationship to the psychological thriller Fatal Attraction (1987). John Driscoll (right) portrays Chance Chancellor, whose engagement to Chloe ends as a result of his cheating.

Chloe's first romantic relationship is with the man believed to be the millionaire son of Jill Abbott, Cane Ashby (Daniel Goddard). In July 2009, it is revealed that Cane Ashby is not the son of Jill Abbott. Hendrickson compared their relationship, which ensued as a result of Chloe practically "threatening him", to the psychological thriller film Fatal Attraction (1987); "I've definitely channeled my inner Glenn Close at times. But I'm trying really hard not to make Chloe go down the crazy path. I don't think she's crazy. She just desperately wants to be loved," she said. While Cane is drunk, Chloe sleeps with him and becomes pregnant. Hendrickson described Chloe's actions as "definitely plotting" but, in reference to Chloe's backstory, said it was "not because of who he is. She just wanted him". Prior to the revelation that she is Kate Valentine, Chloe marries Cane, angering the Chancellors. According to the actress, Chloe's "defense" is, "I came here to start fresh and I wanted to do it on my own. I didn't tell Cane because I was afraid he would think I was going after him for his money. There was no plotting." Chloe disrupts the pairing of Cane and Lily Winters (Christel Khalil), creating a "bitchy" rivalry between the female characters. Ultimately, Chloe gives birth to a daughter named Cordelia "Delia" Abbott (Sophie Pollono). In a dramatic love rectangle storyline, it is revealed that Delia's father is actually Jill's son, Billy Abbott (Billy Miller); this revelation ends Chloe's manipulations of Cane, despite his excitement at the prospect of being a father.

Her involvement with Billy Abbott is another significant romance for Chloe, and the characters marry shortly after Delia is born. However, the marriage ended, paving the way for a reunion between Billy and his high school sweetheart, Mac Browning (Clementine Ford). In response to whether or not the Chloe and Billy pairing should be revisited, Hendrickson stated, "You know what, I really hope so. I’ve definitely asked for it." Chloe's next relationship is with Chance Chancellor (John Driscoll), Jill's grandson who is a virgin. Speaking of the developing romance, John Driscoll said, "At this point Chloe is the object of his affection, and he is attracted to her. He is very interested in her because she has a very rocky background, but through and through she has just been herself. He respects her, and there is a spark and energy between them." Chance loses his virginity to Chloe and they become engaged, though she develops into a "clingy" fiancé. The relationship ends after he cheats on her with Heather Stevens (Eden Riegel). Soon after, Chance fakes his death and enters the Witness Protection Program. Of Chloe's "heartbroken" reaction to his "death" in spite of the bitter break-up, Hendrickson said, "to open up and show what was going on with her was a great release for me, because that entire time she was remaining strong and stable, and like no one is going to mess with her. I mean, no one dumps Chloe Mitchell!"

In the midst of these events, Chloe begins a recurring relationship with Chance's brother Ronan Malloy (Jeff Branson). The actress was pleased with the pairing's potential; "My fingers are crossed that there will be more to come because I think those two characters could go so far with each other". Jeff Branson was also hopeful for the pairing, commending them for bringing out a "different side" of Ronan, describing them as "a chance for him to drop the frosty, crusty exterior he puts on because Chloe really gets under his skin, but in a good way."

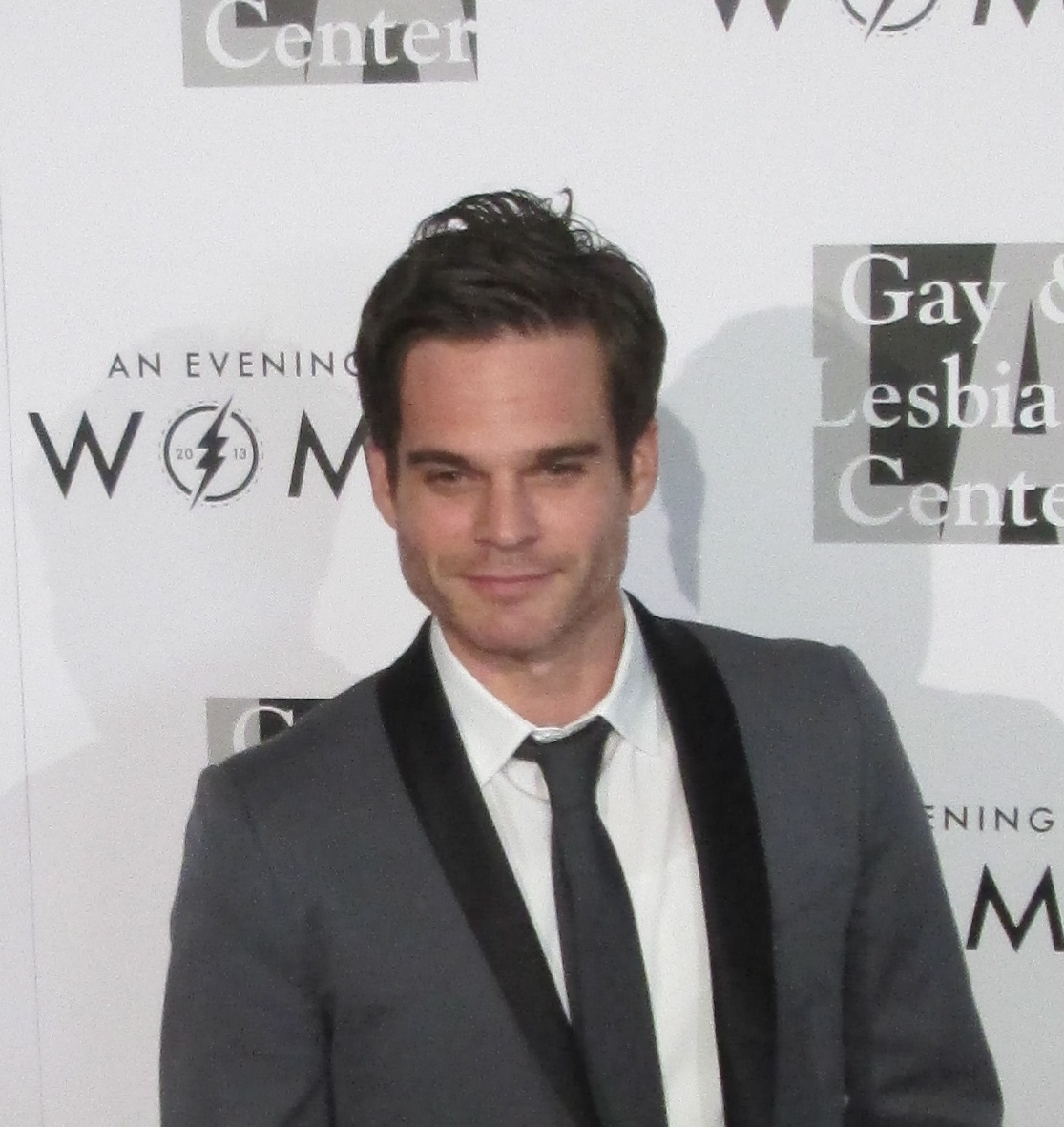
Greg Rikaart plays Kevin Fisher, Chloe's best friend whom she ends up marrying.

Another pivotal romantic relationship for the character occurred when Chloe began dating her best friend Kevin Fisher (Greg Rikaart). The decision to develop the friendship into a romance was debated by the writers, as it was Hendrickson and Rikaart who approached the writers wanting to work together. Due to their real-life friendship, Rikaart said of the storyline turn, "The level of comfort is so easy, certainly for portraying the friendship part of the Kevin/Chloe relationship, that is a no-brainer. So it was like, when are we going to have to start acting?" The relationship is plagued with constant issues, such as interference from Kevin's mentally unstable ex-wife Jana Hawkes (Emily O'Brien), and mob princess Angelina Veneziano's (Diana DeGarmo) intense crush on Kevin (which leads to a brief marriage, with Angelina's mob father threatening to kill Kevin if he doesn't wed his daughter). Angelina leaves town and Chloe and Kevin finally marry. In 2013, Kevin and Chloe have financial troubles which Kevin thinks can be solved through criminal acts; Hendrickson said, "Money is usually a common issue between couples. They’re kind of battling through this struggle. He’s trying to do his best to take care of the family and morally, it just doesn’t sit well with her. Especially with what he’s been through in the past." Rikaart told On-Air On-Soaps that he and Hendrickson have discussed wanting the characters to break up, "We always say, 'We have done this. We have played this. Now let’s play breaking up.' That will be different."

=== Delia's leukemia ===
Chloe sees her daughter Delia through a difficult battle with leukemia in late 2011. Hendrickson was described as giving a "solid performance".

Hendrickson told On-Air On-Soaps of the impact Chloe's daughter, Delia, has on her scenes, "It’s like the best thing ever. I love the way that children change the scenes. It’s so honest, and you have a baby that is screaming and crying when she is supposed to be smiling and happy in the scene, and we have to just go, go, go, and it becomes real and natural. I like being mom for ten minutes and then handing them back."

In September 2011, Delia is rushed to hospital after spiking a high temperature of 105, where she is diagnosed with leukemia, devastating Chloe. SoapNet noted that "Chloe's world is turned upside down" as a result of the diagnosis. The leukemia storyline spans into January 2012. Hendrickson was happy with the storyline, stating that "it was my supporting actors who supported me through the entire shooting day, and the writing. It was just all wrapped up in a neat little package. I could not ask for a better show." Delia needs a bone marrow transplant to survive. Billy is being forced away from town by his wife's father Victor Newman (Eric Braeden). Victor arranges for Billy to secretly be able to donate his bone marrow, saving Delia's life, though he passes the donation off as Kevin's. Hendrickson praised the writing for the storyline as a "full arc" which had a "beginning, middle and an end". She said, "It was a great story. I got to show a lot of range, and also got to work with some great supporting actors who were in those scenes." For the 39th Daytime Emmy Awards, Hendrickson submitted the scenes in which Chloe is informed of Delia's leukemia, which allowed her to receive a nomination in the category of Outstanding Supporting Actress in a Drama Series. In July 2013, Delia has a health scare. In light of Chloe's marriage to Kevin ending and Billy experiencing troubles in his marriage to Victoria Newman (Amelia Heinle), Jamey Giddens of Zap2it observed that this could act as a catalyst towards a "Chilly" (Chloe and Billy) reunion, writing, "The perfect storm of two failing marriages and a sick child seems to be conjuring up the right elements for some Chilly weather in Genoa City."

=== Delia's death ===
In October 2013, Delia is killed in a hit and run accident. Hendrickson felt that it was hard to have her on-screen daughter die, but she was pleased to have an "emotional storyline" that you can "sink your teeth into", stating, "I had been wanting [one] for a long time, which I really haven’t had since [Delia] got cancer. So I was just happy to be a part of an emotional storyline that I was really excited to attempt and be challenged by as an actress." Moments before her death Billy left Delia alone in his car to buy ice-cream, but after her puppy Dash ran away, Delia followed. Billy arrived to find Delia's barely alive body on the side of the road, and called the ambulance. Due to her rough medical history and weak immune system, Delia succumbed to her injuries and died after being rushed to the hospital. Chloe initially blames Billy for their daughter's death, with Hendrickson calling this her "automatic response".

"Delia’s death is the catalyst that will not only force a visceral reaction with viewers, but shake up the canvas with the fallout from the accident. How do you survive the death of a child? It’s something no parent should ever have to experience"

— Omar White-Nobles of TVSource, speaking of the impact that Delia's death will have (2013)

Audiences and critics were unfavorable of the storyline, outraged that Delia was killed off. Jeevan Brar of MSN TV asked the rhetorical question: "If Y&R was so intent on killing off a child and an Abbott, then why not Johnny Abbott?", pointing out that it would have been a more "symbolic" storyline for different reasons. Shortly after her death, Delia's corneas were given to Connor Newman, the newborn son of Chloe's best friend Chelsea Lawson (Melissa Claire Egan) and her ex-husband Adam Newman (Michael Muhney), who was in desperate need of a cornea transplant. Coincidentally, Adam happens to be the driver of the car that killed Delia.

In response to Delia's corneas being donated to Connor Newman in a transplant surgery, Jeevan Brar brought up Colleen Carlton (Tammin Sursok), Delia's cousin, being killed off years earlier for her heart to be donated to a dying Victor Newman (Eric Braeden), Connor's grandfather. Brar wrote, "Now we’ve got another Abbott organ saving a Newman. The character of Delia Abbott was also rich in history because of her parentage: she’s Billy’s child with the daughter of the Chancellor maid. This was a legacy character belonging to two families: the Abbotts and the Chancellors." Similarly, Jamey Giddens of Zap2it noted Delia to be "not only an Abbott, but the granddaughter of original character, Jill Foster. Did I mention Delia is also the child of Kate Valentine aka Chloe Mitchell, herself the goddaughter of Katherine Chancellor, whose death the canvas is still reeling from?", referring to the death of Katherine Chancellor that occurred only two months earlier, which was still a prominent topic in Genoa City.

Hendrickson told TVSource magazine that she was "petrified" of filming the heavily emotional storyline. She stated, "I was just really intimidated because I don’t have a child. I’ve never experienced that unconditional love with someone – for someone [...] I really didn’t have that much to connect to in my own personal life. I think that’s what scared me the most – how I was going to find it within myself to tell a truthful story." Having previously noted that becoming a mother "matured" Chloe, Hendrickson said, "I would love to see a little bit of the old Chloe come out of this extreme loss that she’s just experienced. I think it would make a lot of sense."

== Storylines ==
In 1989, the Chancellor maid Esther Valentine (Kate Linder) engages in a one-night stand with a plumber named Tiny and gives birth to a child, who she names Kate. Esther's employer Katherine Chancellor (Jeanne Cooper) pays for Chloe to attend boarding school at a young age. She makes occasional visits to Genoa City as a child. In 2008, a feisty fashion consultant named Chloe Mitchell arrives in Genoa City after being hired by Cane Ashby (Daniel Goddard) to handle his girlfriend model Lily Winters (Christel Khalil), The Fresh Face of Jabot Cosmetics. Chloe briefly moves in with Lily and her brother Devon Hamilton (Bryton James), but is kicked out for flirting with both Cane and Devon. Chloe discovers that she is pregnant and manipulatively sets up a drunk Cane to believe that they had sex. At a charity gala, Chloe reveals to Cane that they are expecting a child together. A paternal DNA test proves that Cane is not ruled out as the father. Lily dumps Cane who moves in with Chloe and proposes to her for the sake of the unborn child. After Cane and Chloe marry, a party thrown for them by Cane's "mother" Jill Abbott (Jess Walton) reveals that Chloe is in fact Kate Valentine. Despite initial resentment towards her mother, Chloe gives Esther a chance, and they become close.

Before the birth of Chloe's child, an affair she had with Cane's "brother" Billy Abbott (Billy Miller) is revealed through flashbacks, making it clear that he is the father of the baby. Following the birth of Cordelia "Delia" Abbott and the truth being revealed, Cane is enraged and still wants to be Delia's legal father, filing a custody suit against Chloe which is soon dropped. Chloe then briefly marries Billy for Delia's sake. The marriage is tainted from its inception due to Billy sleeping with Sharon Newman (Sharon Case) the night before their wedding. They are soon divorced, and she moves on with Phillip "Chance" Chancellor IV (John Driscoll), Jill's grandson through Phillip Chancellor III (Thom Bierdz). He loses his virginity to her and the couple are soon engaged, though the engagement is thwarted when Chance cheats on Chloe with attorney Heather Stevens (Eden Riegel). Her unlucky romantic streak continues when Chloe and her best friend Kevin Fisher (Greg Rikaart) begin falling for each other. They soon begin a relationship, though Kevin's mentally unstable ex-wife Jana Hawkes (Emily O' Brien) comes in between them. Due to her mental illness, Jana kidnaps Kevin. Chloe tracks them down and threatens to fight with Jana; Jana suffers an intracranial aneurysm and dies on the spot. Kevin and Chloe are then free to be together, but he leaves her due to her inability to move past previous relationships. Chloe briefly sleeps with Ronan Malloy (Jeff Branson), Chance's brother.

Chloe takes over full custody of her daughter from Billy; Delia is later diagnosed with leukemia, and Billy's bone marrow donation saves her life. During this trying time, Chloe reconnects with Kevin, and they become engaged following Delia's recovery. Mob princess Angelina Veneziano (Diana DeGarmo) arrives in town and develops a crush on Kevin. Her father Angelo Veneziano (Mike Starr) blackmails Kevin into leaving Chloe at the altar and marry Angelina, which he does. Once Angelina leaves town, Chloe and Kevin marry and resume their courtship. The couple join forces with Adam (Michael Muhney) and Chelsea Newman (Melissa Claire Egan) to start a fashion website entitled TagNGrab. The site ends unsuccessfully, leaving Chloe and Kevin in need of money. In a Bonnie and Clyde themed story arc, they steal money to save their house. Their marriage flounders as Kevin continues to steal and lets Chloe spend a night in jail for his crime, and they decide to get a divorce, which particularly affects Delia who adored her stepfather. During this period Chloe develops a fashion line for Jabot's fashion division with her best friend, Chelsea. Months later, Chloe and Kevin decide to start over and begin dating again. On the night of Delia's performance in a play, Billy leaves Delia and her dog, Dash, alone in his car while purchasing ice-cream. Dash runs off, causing Delia to run after him. Delia is struck down by a car believed to be driven by Adam, before being rushed to the hospital and dying of her injuries. When she learns of Delia's death from Billy at the hospital, Chloe breaks down and begins lashing out emotionally at Billy and everyone around her. Chloe decides to honor Delia by donating her corneas to Adam's son, Connor, who needs a transplant to save his eyesight. The operation is successful and Connor's vision is restored.

Following Connor receiving Delia's corneas, Chloe began to become more attached to him. Unbeknownst to Chelsea and Kevin, Chloe's attachment becomes unhealthy, especially when Kevin finds that Chloe included photographs of Connor in Delia's baby scrapbook. While Billy goes to grief counseling, Chloe refuses and says she is handling her grief from Delia's death by herself. When it is revealed that Chelsea's husband Adam in fact struck Delia with his car that night and is later presumed dead, Chloe becomes increasingly angry with Chelsea and goes so far as blaming her for Delia's death. Afterward, Chloe breaks down at a fundraiser event for a foundation in Delia's name and goes into Chelsea's home (who had initially planned on moving to Paris with Adam and Connor), takes Connor and Chelsea's passport and poses as her at the airport, where she intends on flying to Paris with Connor and starting a new life. Chelsea and Kevin meet Chloe and Connor in Paris, where she comes to terms with what she's done. Back in Genoa City, Chloe is arrested for kidnapping and is given the choice of psychiatric inpatient or outpatient treatment. Wanting outpatient treatment, she has to be placed under a conservatorship, and not wanting it to be under Esther, Kevin proposes to her and they abruptly marry again. Not considering their reunion to be genuine, Chloe refuses to consummate her marriage with Kevin, hurting him. Despite Chelsea and Chloe making up, she is offended when Chelsea registers a restraining order against her, keeping her away from Connor. They later appear to make up, but Chloe still harbors anger for her and tears up one of the dresses Chelsea designed for a Jabot fashion shoot. Despite receiving treatment, Chloe decides that she wants another child to replace Delia, however not fathered by Kevin but by Billy. She asks Billy for his sperm so she can be inseminated and become pregnant, but he immediately refuses and alerts Chelsea, Kevin and her other loved ones. While they plan an intervention, Chloe goes to the sperm bank at the hospital and is able to steal a specimen of sperm that Billy donated when he was trying to get pregnant with his wife, Victoria. She is blindsided by what her loved ones propose, which is getting treatment from a psychiatric facility. Kevin also accepted that he can't give Chloe the help she needs and Chloe accepts that she needs help. She chooses a facility in California, the night before leaving, she and Kevin make love one last time. She leaves town soon after, having had heartfelt goodbyes with her friends and family. However, she reveals that she still has Billy's sperm in her bag before leaving town. Soon after, Kevin sends her flowers, but she refuses them, and asks that Kevin not visit her, devastating him.

Chloe briefly returns to Genoa City on the one-year anniversary of Delia's death. She reveals to Kevin that she had been given a 24-hour pass from the clinic in order to visit the accident site. She tells Kevin that she also does not plan on returning to Genoa City, instead wishing to begin a new life somewhere else, without Kevin and her family. As she leaves, she rubs her pregnant belly, assuring Delia that her emptiness would once again by fulfilled, believing that the child is Billy's when it could also be Kevin's. She returns again in 2016, working as an outside aid to Victor under the alias of Dorothy Gale, helping plot out his revenge against Adam. When Victor ends up shot and in the hospital, Chloe unveils herself and confesses that she and her daughter, Bella, will be making a permanent return to Genoa City, to make sure Adam ultimately pays for his crimes, once and for all. She later shoots Adam and orchestrates an explosion, leading to his death, but covers up her involvement in the ordeal with Victor's help. After returning to Genoa City permanently with her daughter, Chloe reconnects with Kevin and Chelsea as she and Kevin prepare to remarry. However, Nick Newman (Joshua Morrow) expresses suspicion to Chelsea over Chloe's possible role in Adam's death and her crimes are revealed at her wedding to Kevin; once again with Victor's help, she arranges to disappear again. Meanwhile, Bella is revealed as Kevin's biological daughter. Chloe later fakes her death and brings Kevin into her scheme, convincing him it was the only way for them to be a family with their daughter. They move to Portland, Oregon under different names and disappear; however, Kevin later returns to Genoa City with Bella, with no mention of Chloe's whereabouts as she is believed to be dead. In 2019, Chloe resurfaces in Genoa City and shoots Adam upon finding out that he survived the explosion. Adam shuts down the investigation by finding a fall guy to take the rap for the shooting and he takes matters into his own hands to track down an alive Chloe. Chloe is then kidnapped and placed in a motel room and Kevin eventually comes to get her out. Adam arrives with him as well and stands his ground with Chloe. He pours his heart out about his regrets of the night Delia died and tells Chloe that her vendetta against him needs to end and she should do it for Bella’s sake. Afterwards, Chloe meets up with Billy and he is shocked that she is alive. She asks him to look over Kevin because she knows that he agreed to work for Adam in exchange for her freedom. Chloe then leaves Genoa City again for Oregon. In August 2019, Chloe is arrested and brought back to town but Michael is able to get the charges dropped against her and get her out of custody considering he was the new district attorney. Chloe is freed and moves into the Chancellor Estate with Kevin and Bella as she rebuilds her life. On Christmas Day, Chloe tells Kevin she’s pregnant and later on asks Chelsea to the baby’s godmother. In August 2020, Chloe gives birth to a boy and allows Kevin to choose the name. He decides on the name Miles because it was the name of a man in his past who helped through a difficult time in his life when he was growing up. In 2021, Chloe is offered a job by Adam at Newman Media to help create a fashion division at the company as she is hesitant at for but ultimately accepts. She becomes friends with Sally Spectra (Courtney Hope) when she suggests to Adam to hire her at the company in which he does.

== Reception ==
"Classic soap vixens are a dying breed. Thanks to this past year’s writers’ strike, daytime-TV fans have been treated to a rare gift: the birth of what could become one of the most legendary bitches in soap history, thanks to The Young and the Restless casting acting sensation Elizabeth Hendrickson as mean girl Chloe Mitchell."

— Nelson Branco, TV Guide (2008)

Upon her introduction, Chloe was received positively by audiences. Soap Opera Weekly praised the character, stating, "What started as a 10-episode arc as a bitchy stylist transformed into a meaty contract character and an even meatier storyline for Elizabeth Hendrickson." The magazine also considered Chloe the "complex Genoa City bad girl", and observed that "viewers aren't exactly loving Chloe" for driving a wedge between the popular pairing of Cane and Lily. Speaking of the character's pregnancy, Allison Waldman of TV Squad was unconvinced of Chloe's schemes regarding the child's paternity, writing, "I'm having doubts about Chloe's bun in the oven. She claims that Cane's the father, based on one drunken night in a car that he has blacked out of his memory. Chloe's hardly a reliable source, especially since it's just been revealed that she's Kate, Esther's daughter. Yes, Esther, Kay's maid for the last 20 years or so. Cane's had DNA tests done, but they only prove he could be the baby's father. Watch, this baby is going to have an interesting back story." Carolyn Hinsey of the New York Daily News said Chloe's backstory reveal was a "shock" to fans and in light of her pregnancy wrote, "Anyone who thinks Chloe's lies are over hasn't been paying attention. Is the baby even Cane's?" Jillian Bowe of Zap2it credited the character as a "quirky fashion diva", and penned the reunion between Chloe and Esther "long overdue".

After it became known that Billy, not Cane, fathered Chloe's daughter Delia, journalist Michael Fairman of On-Air On-Soaps praised the storyline that involved Chloe, Lily, Billy and Cane as "one of soaps all-time best quadrangle story arcs". Jeevan Brar of TV Buzz noted the popularity that Chloe and Billy (a couple that fans have named "Chilly") generated, writing, "A lot of fans saw that pairing end way too quickly to make way for the ill-fated Billy & Mac redux." Referring to the love triangle between Chance, Chloe and Heather, Nekeeta Borden (also writing for Zap2it) said, "All things considered, will Chance and Chloe survive Hurricane Heather?" In another article, Borden heavily criticized the writing for Chloe's character. She wrote, "Initially I hated the pint-sized minx when she first planted her stilettos in Genoa City and on Lily’s face a few years back, but lately I've come to realize how much I miss the scheming, sassy Chloe of old [...] The pairing with [Chance] killed poor Chloe dead. She, like Phyllis Newman (Michelle Stafford), is not meant to be some happy housewife, married to a boy scout. Chloe needs a sparring partner and partner-in-crime. She is way too much woman to be cheated on by someone like Chance." Also unfavorable of the relationship was Sara Bibel of Xfinity, who wrote that "Chance and Chloe never had much chemistry. She was attracted to him because she thought he was a safe, dependable guy who would not cheat on her", describing Chance as "the anti-Billy" in Chloe's eyes.

Reception towards the pairing of Chloe and Kevin was initially positive. In December 2010, On-Air On-Soaps said of the potential couple, "If there are two young stars that break the mold from your standardized soap opera acting style, the names Greg Rikaart and Elizabeth Hendrickson of The Young and the Restless are at the very top of the list." Andrea W. of Yahoo! Voices was also receptive of the potential pairing. She wrote, "Chloe and Kevin make a wonderful couple and I surly hope they overcome all of the obstacles they may or may not face. Kevin is wonderful with her daughter which is one of the most important parts of a relationship. I also hope they stay together because deep down Kevin has changed and he has turned into such a great and nice guy."

In contrast to a positive early response, Zap2it placed Chloe and Kevin fifth on their list of "10 Worst Soap Opera Couples of 2012" by the end of the year. They wrote, "sometimes the Geek and the Glamour Puss are meant to just be friends." In June 2013, over two years into the Kevin/Chloe romance, Luke Kerr (also of Zap2it) said, "I love Greg Rikaart and Elizabeth Hendrickson separately, but the Kevin/Chloe pairing has gone from a nice, Crimson Lights latte to rotten, spoiled, curdling milk. The Young and the Restless needs to put a fork in this relationship — it's done." Hendrickson's portrayal earned her a Daytime Emmy Award nomination for Outstanding Supporting Actress in a Drama Series in 2012 and 2014.
