= Diana DeGarmo =

American singer (born 1987)

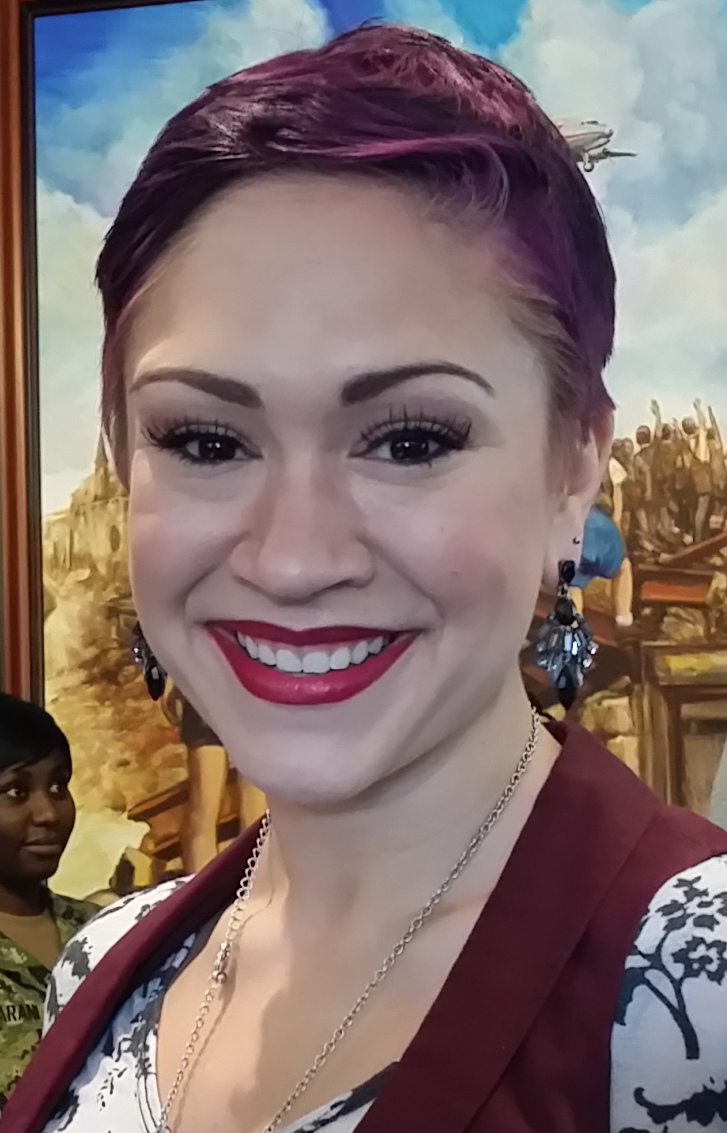
- DeGarmo on the 2015 USO tour

Background information
- Born: Diana Nicole DeGarmo; June 16, 1987 (age 39); Birmingham, Alabama, U.S.
- Origin: Snellville, Georgia
- Genres: Country; pop
- Occupations: Singer; actress
- Years active: 1996–present
- Labels: RCA; Mailboat
- Spouse: Ace Young (m. 2013)
- Website: dianadegarmo.com

Diana Nicole DeGarmo (born June 16, 1987) is an American singer. She rose to fame in 2004 as the runner-up of the third season of American Idol, releasing her debut studio album, Blue Skies, later that year. The following year, DeGarmo ventured into a career in musical theatre. She has starred in two Broadway, one off-Broadway and three national tours. She made her television acting debut in a six-month arc as Angelina Veneziano on The Young and the Restless. DeGarmo has since released two extended plays, Unplugged in Nashville (2009) and Live to Love (2012). She is married to fifth season American Idol finalist Ace Young.

== Early life ==
Diana DeGarmo was born on June 16, 1987 in Birmingham, Alabama, but was raised primarily in the Atlanta suburb of Snellville, Georgia. DeGarmo began singing at a young age, including the 1997 Georgia Music Hall of Fame Awards, and in Atlanta-based stage productions of Annie and Joseph and the Amazing Technicolor Dreamcoat.

At age ten, she was part of the Cartoon Gang on Cartoon Network, appearing in various bumper segments. In third grade, she was a Coca-Cola Kid during the 1996 Summer Olympics in Atlanta. The next year, she sang at Opryland USA during the Christmas season. In 2002, she was named Miss Georgia's Teen and was also a finalist on the NBC talent search program America's Most Talented Kid.

== Career ==
=== American Idol ===
DeGarmo took part in the third season of American Idol in 2004, finishing second to winner Fantasia Barrino. She was 16 years old at the time she competed. She reached the bottom three and was at risk for elimination on three occasions. She became one of the front-runners by week six.

She performed around the country with the other third-season top-ten contestants during the summer of 2004.

==== Performances ====
Week #	Song choice	Original artist	Result
Top 32	"I've Got the Music in Me"	Kiki Dee	Advanced
Top 12	"Think"	Aretha Franklin	Safe
Top 11	"A Broken Wing"	Martina McBride	Bottom 3
Top 10	"Do You Love Me"	The Contours	Safe
Top 9	"I'm Still Standing"	Elton John	Bottom 3
Top 8	"My Heart Will Go On"	Celine Dion	Bottom 3
Top 7	"One Voice"	Barry Manilow	Safe
Top 6	"Turn the Beat Around"	Vicki Sue Robinson	Safe
Top 5	"Someone to Watch Over Me" "Get Happy"	Gertrude Lawrence; Ruth Etting	Safe
Top 4	"This Is It" "No More Tears (Enough Is Enough)"	Melba Moore; Donna Summer & Barbra Streisand	Safe
Top 3	"Ain't No Mountain High Enough" "Because You Loved Me" "Don't Cry Out Loud"	Marvin Gaye & Tammi Terrell; Celine Dion; The Moments	Safe
Finale	"I Believe" "No More Tears (Enough Is Enough)" "Don't Cry Out Loud" (Encore)	Fantasia Barrino/Diana DeGarmo; Donna Summer & Barbra Streisand; The Moments	Runner-up

=== Post-Idol music ===
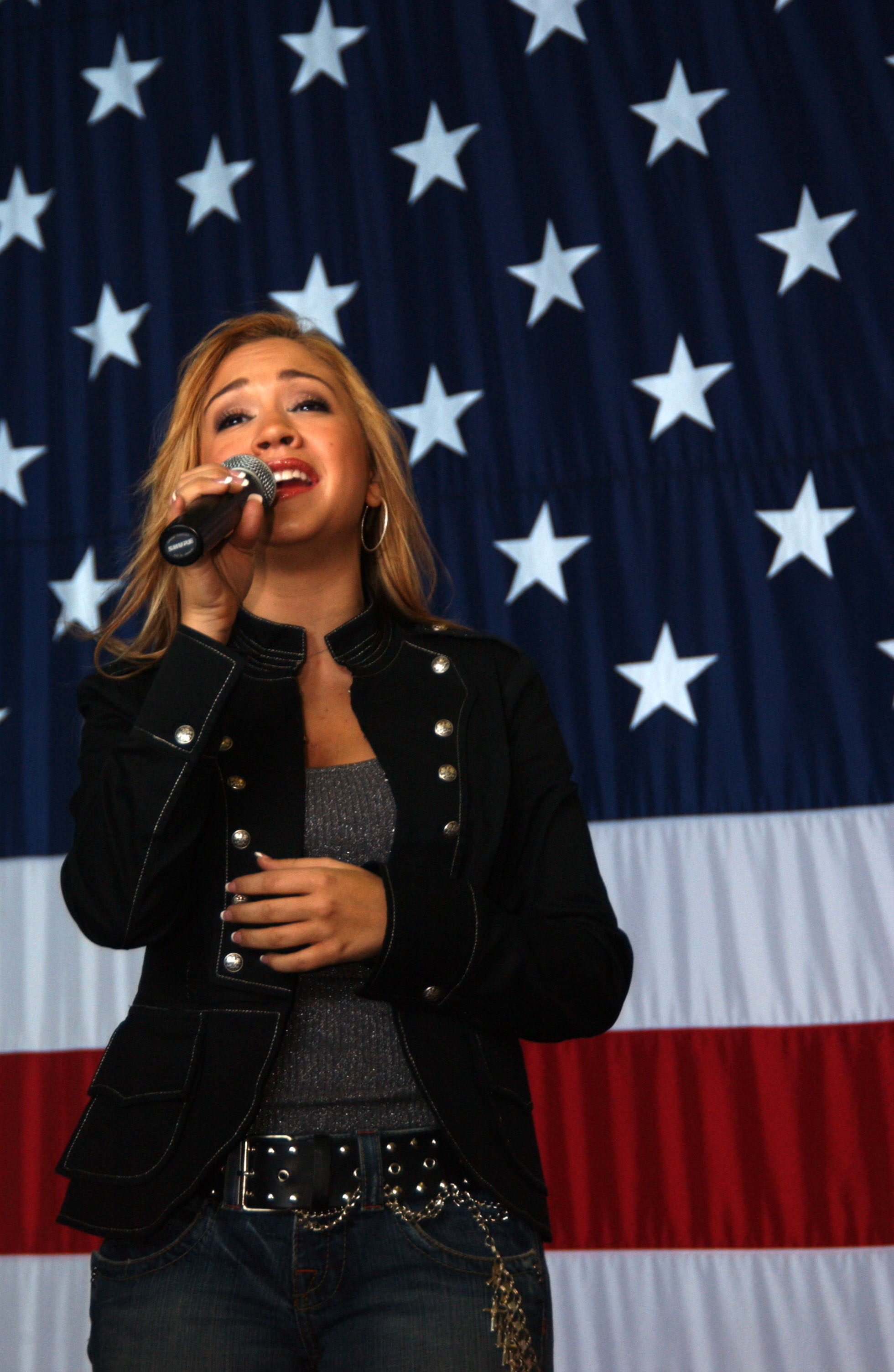
DeGarmo on a 2005 USO tour

DeGarmo was signed to RCA Records shortly after the Idol finale and released her single, "Dreams," on June 29, 2004. The single reached number 2 in Canada and number 14 on the Billboard Hot 100 chart. The single also included her version of "I Believe" and a remake of Melissa Manchester's "Don't Cry Out Loud". She recorded her debut album in between Idol summer tour stops.

DeGarmo's debut album, Blue Skies, was released on December 7, 2004, to opening week sales of 47,000. The album debuted at number 52 on the Billboard 200 and included songs written by future American Idol judge Kara DioGuardi, as well as Desmond Child, Adam Shankman, and Andreas Carlsson, among others. As of fall 2008, the album had sold 168,000 copies with little to no advertising. The lone single from the CD, "Emotional", was released to radio in November 2004, peaking at number 54 on the Mediabase Pop Chart. She toured independently in the spring and summer of 2005 in support of Blue Skies. During the same time she recorded a song for the soundtrack of the Disney movie Ice Princess. "Reaching for Heaven", written by Desmond Child, can be heard during the climactic ice skating scene in the movie. In June 2005, RCA and DeGarmo parted ways. On September 17, 2005, DeGarmo received the Horizon Award at the Georgia Music Hall Of Fame Awards ceremony; the award recognizes Georgia artists on the path to successful and lengthy careers.

DeGarmo began recording a pop/R&B album in 2007; however, she backed out of the project to return to her country music roots. After filming CMT's Gone Country in late 2007, she relocated to Nashville. She signed to John Rich's production company and recorded material with him in 2008. The songs were never released and DeGarmo moved on to other collaborators. In February 2009 she self-released a four-song acoustic country EP, Unplugged in Nashville, to digital retailers.

In March 2012, DeGarmo wrote "Good Goodbye" for use with her character on The Young and the Restless. It was released to iTunes and was included on her May 2012 EP Live to Love. After producing a music video for "Good Goodbye," fans were asked to vote on two versions of the video on the American Idol website. The winning video became available on iTunes.

DeGarmo's second album, Gemini, was released August 2, 2019 with a release concert at Sony Hall. DeGarmo presented and streamed a live concert of Gemini in the summer of 2020, ultimately winning the 2020 BroadwayWorld Award for Best Streamed Concert.

=== Musical theatre ===
DeGarmo appeared as Maria in an American Musical Theatre of San Jose production of West Side Story in November 2005. The following February, she succeeded Tracy Miller as Penny Pingleton in a four-month run of Hairspray. She also performed the lead role of Brooklyn in the 2006 national tour of Brooklyn: The Musical alongside Melba Moore. DeGarmo returned to Hairspray for a second engagement from September 2006 to February 2007. She made her Carnegie Hall debut in April 2007 at a tribute to Neil Sedaka.

In 2008, DeGarmo was set to star in a Broadway revival of Godspell at the Ethel Barrymore Theatre, but on August 19, it was announced that the show was postponed indefinitely due to the loss of an investor.

In May 2009, DeGarmo starred in the musical revue Back to Bacharach and David, which featured the songs of Burt Bacharach and Hal David. The Kathy Najimy created and produced show played a limited two-week engagement in Los Angeles at the Music Box Theater on Hollywood Boulevard. In July 2009, she starred as the narrator in the Oklahoma Lyric's Theatre production of Joseph and the Amazing Technicolor Dreamcoat alongside Idol alum Anthony Federov. Her next role saw her return to New York City when she debuted in August 2009 as Sarah, the "sexy, blind librarian" and love interest of Toxie, in the off-Broadway musical The Toxic Avenger. The show was housed at New World Stages. DeGarmo remained with Avenger until it closed on January 3, 2010.

DeGarmo made her return to Broadway, starring as Sheila in the Broadway company of Hair where she met her future husband, Ace Young. She succeeded original cast member Caissie Levy beginning March 9, 2010. She played Sheila until the show's closure on June 27, 2010.

DeGarmo played the role of Doralee Rhodes in the national tour of 9 to 5, which was launched in Nashville on September 21, 2010. She ended her run as Doralee after the July 2011 Minneapolis tour stop.

DeGarmo appeared on musical theatre composer Scott Alan's third album, What I Wanna Be When I Grow Up with the song "I Wish", released November 1, 2010.

She reprised the role of Penny Pingleton in the Hollywood Bowl production of Hairspray, which ran from August 5–7, 2011.

DeGarmo has done several readings for new musicals over the years, starting with In Your Dreams in early October 2006. In 2009, she played the title role in a concert for Liberty: A New Musical at the New York Musical Theatre Festival (NYMF) and in 2009 played the role of Chris in the much anticipated reading of an updated Carrie: The Musical. In 2011 and again in 2013 she played Fern/Vylette in Manhattan industry readings of "Jawbreaker," a musical based on the 1990s movie of the same name.

In January 2013, DeGarmo played "Sally" in the pre-Broadway run of the new musical "NERDS," in Raleigh, NC, for the North Carolina Theatre.

DeGarmo played The Narrator in the national tour of Andrew Lloyd Webber's musical Joseph and the Amazing Technicolor Dreamcoat from March 4, 2014, to April 2015.

In June 2015, DeGarmo starred as Dorothy in Studio Tenn's production of The Wizard of Oz at The Schermerhorn Symphony Theater in Nashville, Tennessee.

She played Lucy in the 2016 to 2017 world tour of Jekyll & Hyde.

In 2023, she played the Witch in a regional production of Into the Woods. In September 2024, she returned to the regional stage as Audrey in Little Shop of Horrors.

=== Film and television ===
In 2006, DeGarmo was the singing voice of Cosmo on the "Fairy Idol" episode of The Fairly OddParents.

DeGarmo joined the cast of The Young and the Restless in October 2011. She portrayed Angelina Veneziano, the daughter of resident mobster, Angelo. Her character was a terrible singer who was obsessed with gaining the affections of Kevin Fisher. Her character went through a redemption arc, and by the time her last episode aired in March 2012, Angelina not only could sing, she had matured into a kinder and gentler character.

In film, DeGarmo played Dora Hand, a dance hall singer in the 2012 western film Wyatt Earp's Revenge.

DeGarmo made a cameo appearance as herself in the Lifetime Network holiday movie All About Christmas Eve starring Haylie Duff. She also appeared on the second season of TLC's wedding dress show Brides of Beverly Hills, which documented her search for a wedding dress.

During 2013, DeGarmo and Ace Young hosted a weekly one-hour entertainment show, Planet 360. It started on the Hallmark Movie Channel in March, moved to TVGN in May and was canceled in December.

In 2013, DeGarmo starred in an independent film comedy, Alto. DeGarmo's character, Frankie, is a struggling musician who falls in love with the daughter of a mafia don, and the two women become involved in a murder while also trying to come out to "Family." As of June 2015 the film has been shown at four festivals: The Miami Gay and Lesbian Film Festival, The VisionFest Film Festival in New York City, the Hoboken International Film Festival in Middletown, New York and the Frameline LGBTQ film festival in San Francisco. DeGarmo was nominated for the Jack Nance Breakthrough Performance Award at VisionFest, where Alto won the Audience Award.

In 2016, DeGarmo's third film, The Morning Sun, based on the play The Morning the Sun Fell Down, was released.

=== Charities ===
DeGarmo is a celebrity ambassador of the Muscular Dystrophy Association, and supports the cause at events including the 2012 MDA "Show of Strength" Telethon to raise money for children and adults with neuromuscular disease. She also supports and performs in fundraisers for a number of charitable organizations both nationally and locally, including Broadway Cares/Equity Fights Aids.

=== Other activities ===
DeGarmo was the first American Idol finalist to participate in a USO tour. She has been on four USO tours overseas:

- From December 2005 through January 2006 she entertained troops in Southwest Asia on a tour hosted by General Peter Pace. Her song "Thank You" is inspired by this trip.
- In April 2012, she and Ace Young toured, accompanied by fellow performers and athletes Anthony Anderson, Weeman, Dennis Haysbert, Randy Johnson, and The Dallas Cowboys Cheerleaders.
- In February 2013 she toured with Ace Young, Peyton Manning, Austin Collie, Curt Schilling and the Dallas Cowboys Cheerleaders.
- In March 2015, DeGarmo, Andrew Luck, Weeman, Miss America, and several other celebrities toured the Middle East and military installations in Korea, Japan, and Hawaii.

In late 2007/early 2008, DeGarmo participated as a Southern celebrity in television ads for the Zaxby's restaurant chain.

== Personal life ==
DeGarmo is the niece of Eddie DeGarmo of DeGarmo & Key.

DeGarmo married Ace Young on June 1, 2013, at the Luxe Sunset Boulevard hotel in Los Angeles. She lives in Nashville, Tennessee with Young.

== Discography ==
=== Albums ===
Title	Details	Peak chart positions	Sales
Title	Details	US	Sales
Blue Skies	Release date: December 7, 2004; Label: RCA; Format: CD, digital download	52	US: 168,000
GEMINI	Release date: August 2, 2019; Label: Dixie Rose Entertainment; Format: LP, digital download	—	US: N/A
"—" denotes a recording that did not chart.

=== Extended plays ===
Title	Details	Peak chart positions	Sales
Title	Details	US	Sales
Unplugged in Nashville	Release date: February 27, 2009; Label: Independent release; Format: Digital download	—	US: N/A
Live to Love	Release date: May 22, 2012; Label: Young Brothers Entertainment; Format: Digital download	—	US: N/A
"—" denotes a recording that did not chart.

=== Singles ===
Year	Title	Chart positions		Album
Year	Title	US	CAN	Album
2004	"Dreams"	14	2	Non-album single
2004	"Emotional"	—	—	Blue Skies
2012	"Good Goodbye"	—	—	Live to Love; featured on The Young and the Restless

=== Other recordings ===
Released	Title	Album
March 15, 2005	"Reaching for Heaven"	Ice Princess Original Soundtrack
November 1, 2010	"I Wish"	What I Wanna Be When I Grow Up – The Songs of Scott Alan

=== Music videos ===
Year	Title	Director
2012	"Good Goodbye"	Spenser Cohen
