= Kevin Fisher (The Young and the Restless) =

- The Young and the Restless character
- Portrayed by: Greg Rikaart
- Duration: 2003–present
- First appearance: July 11, 2003
- Created by: Kay Alden and John F. Smith
- Introduced by: David Shaughnessy and John F. Smith (2003); Anthony Morina and Josh Griffith (2019)
In-universe information
- Other names: Kevin Baldwin
- Occupation: Computer expert Waiter
- Father: Tom Fisher
- Mother: Gloria Abbott Bardwell
- Half-brothers: Michael Baldwin; Ryder Callahan
- Half-sisters: Daisy Carter
- Wife: Jana Hawkes (2008–10); Angelina Veneziano (2012); Chloe Mitchell (2012–14, 2014)
- Sons: Miles Mitchell Fisher
- Daughters: Bella Fisher
- Nephews: Fenmore Baldwin
- Nieces: Lucy Romalotti

Kevin Fisher is a fictional character from the American CBS soap opera The Young and the Restless, portrayed by Greg Rikaart. Created by former head writers Kay Alden and John F. Smith, the character made his debut during the episode airing on July 11, 2003.

Rikaart's portrayal of the role was only slated to be short term, however, the character's popularity resulted in the actor being placed on contract. Introduced as an internet predator, the character later developed into a "good person", keeping away from criminal activity. Kevin is known for his relationships with Jana Hawkes (Emily O'Brien), which was well received by viewers and garnered a fan following, as well, with Chloe Mitchell (Elizabeth Hendrickson). Their romance has been subject to mixed reviews. Rikaart has been praised for his portrayal of the role; Michael Fairman of On-Air On-Soaps considers him to be "one of the most talented and best young actors on daytime".

Rikaart's performance has been met with critical acclaim, having garnered him Daytime Emmy Award nominations for Outstanding Supporting Actor in a Drama Series in 2006, 2007, 2008, and 2018, winning the award in 2005.

== Development ==
=== Early years ===
Rikaart, on Kevin's "bad side" (2008)

Going back to Kevin's earliest roots, when we first met him he was just, on paper, this evil guy, who, if you told people he was sympathetic, they would have looked at you like you were crazy. But it wouldn't have been challenging to play this 'evil bad guy' who was doing evil, bad things.

— Candace Young, Soaps.com

Kevin was introduced as an internet predator, and later committed multiple other felonies. After his criminal activity died down, Rikaart commented that, "In a way, it's almost like he got what he wanted". He stated: "This life that has always seemed so appealing to him - a wife, he owns his own business, and is respected in the community. But he's had a moment to reflect and say, 'Wait a second, is that it?' I think it seems kind of complacent and boring to him, and again, it's fighting the urges of his past versus what he knows is the right thing to do. And let's be real—if he stopped being who he was, people might like him, but eventually they'd grow tired of watching Kevin just pour coffee." He added that, "Most of us are good people, but we've done bad things, and if someone has a mean streak, it doesn't mean they're incapable of doing good things." Upon his debut, Kevin targeted Lily Winters (Christel Khalil); they had a sexual encounter and he infected Lily with the sexually transmitted disease chlamydia. Khalil taped public service announcements related to the story, and considered the plot one of her favorites. She stated: "How many soaps have really covered that? The meeting on the Internet, getting an STD, it was really great stuff." When asked why he is able to "tap into Kevin's vulnerability so well", Rikaart stated: "I think showing vulnerability gets me through the tough stuff that comes his way sometimes, where it’s like me as an ethical person might judge Kevin’s motives." Rikaart stated what he liked most about Kevin is "the push/pull that happens in his brain, where he is like, “I want to be a better person. I want to be a good guy.” Then it's really easy for him to get lured into some sort of underhanded stuff."

=== Relationships ===
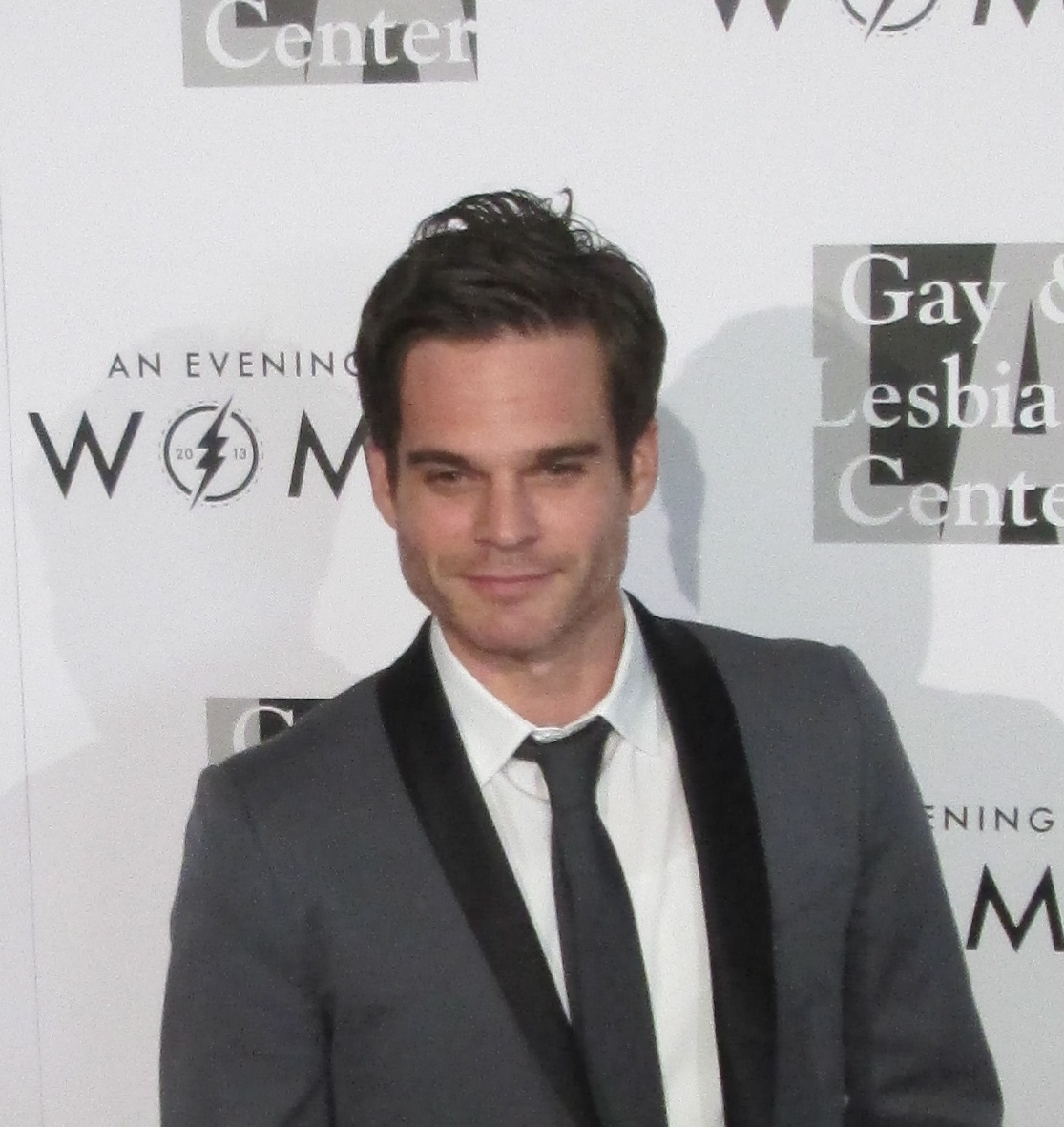
Greg Rikaart stated that his personal relationship with Elizabeth Hendrickson influenced former head writer Maria Arena Bell to pair their characters.

In 2008, Kevin married Jana Hawkes (Emily O'Brien), and their pairing garnered a fan following. Of their relationship, Rikaart stated: "Jana's very suspicious of Kevin and what he's done, and feels really bad about it. I have faith that we're solid as a couple to survive that, but it's also going to provide some really great, and much needed, conflict between the two." Jana later began to have bizarre behavior, which was explained after her diagnosis of a brain tumor. Rikaart stated: "That is what we are banking on, at least for Kevin. The tumor was this great explanation for Jana’s behavior. I think he never really understood why she did what she did. Kevin is trying to create this whole defense for her; that everything she did was because of the tumor." In 2010, Kevin divorced Jana and later began dating Chloe Mitchell (Elizabeth Hendrickson). Rikaart and Hendrickson later stated that their personal relationship influenced former head writer Maria Arena Bell to pair the characters. Of Kevin's love and relationship with Chloe, Rikaart stated, "It came out of that sort of build of emotions that have been happening within him, that whether he realized it or not, has been going on for a long time already." Hendrickson added that she thought Chloe "had been through so much with guys, and even if she had feelings for Kevin, it was so deep down that it wasn’t even something she was willing to recognize. I think that what happened between her two great loves had damaged her so much, that I don’t think she was willing to accept the fact that this is possibly what love could be like."

In 2011, when she first arrived in Genoa City, Angelina Veneziano (Diana DeGarmo) set her eyes on Kevin, whom she developed a huge crush on. Of her crazy crush, DeGarmo said: "Ooh, she wants him bad! Angie has her eyes, her heart and her body set on landing Kevin — and it scares him to death." She said that Kevin was too sweet and nervous, and is weakened to Angelina's preying on him. "She loves seeing him squirm", DeGarmo stated. Of working with Rikaart, she said: "Greg and I can't stop laughing during our scenes together." During an interview with MSN, she stated: "I've had the great pleasure sharing the screen with Mr. Greg Rikaart. Angelina gets a little bit of a crush on Kevin, and she's not afraid not to show it. It's a blast, because she makes him incredibly nervous [sic] The sparks that fly on screen are just hilarious. It's wonderful to be a part of." Just before Kevin was set to marry Chloe, Angelina persuaded him to help her escape town, as she was in danger.

Things later got to the stage where Angelina's father forced Kevin to marry his daughter. Becca Badget of Yahoo! wrote: "Kevin keeps to himself that he married Angelina to avoid a bullet from Angelo's henchman. The guests are unaware that he married her to stay alive." On whether or not Kevin will ever love her, DeGarmo said: "I know she sure hopes so. She did try to get him to marry her." The relationship, however, ended when Angelina realizes that he never loved her. DeGarmo said: "Kevin does see the light inside Angelina, even though that light may be a little dim sometimes." Kevin and Chloe were able to marry in March 2012. They decided to start a website together, titled TagNGrab.

In 2013, Kevin and Chloe battle money struggles, causing him to commit crimes in order to obtain money. Hendrickson stated they were having "a blast" with the storyline, saying: "Money is usually a common issue between couples. They’re kind of battling through this struggle. He’s trying to do his best to take care of the family and morally, it just doesn’t sit well with her. Especially with what he’s been through in the past." Rikaart told On-Air On-Soaps that he and Hendrickson have discussed wanting the characters to break up, "We always say, 'We have done this. We have played this. Now let’s play breaking up.' That will be different." Kevin and Chloe's relationship has been subject to mixed reviews. Although Zap2it praised the pairing in 2010, they later listed the pair on their "10 Worst Soap Opera Couples of 2012". They stated: "We were all fans of John Hughes' movies in the '80s, but sometimes the Geek and the Glamour Puss are meant to just be friends; this is certainly the case with Kevin Fisher's (Greg Rikaart) sexless romance with Chloe Mitchell (Elizabeth Hendrickson) on The Young and the Restless. We adore Kev and Chloe—separately—but as a couple they do absolutely nothing for us."

In May 2017, it was reported that Rikaart would be exiting the show, last airing in August. Rikaart last aired on July 18, 2017, alongside Elizabeth Hendrickson's Chloe Mitchell. However, Rikaart continued to make appearances until February 20, 2018. In April 2019, following Rikaart's departure from Days of Our Lives, it was announced that he would return in the role, returning during the final moments of the June 7, 2019, episode.

== Storylines ==
In 2003, teenaged Lily Winters met a mentally unstable internet predator, Kevin Fisher, in an online chat room. Even though Kevin was much older than Lily, the two start dating, and Kevin often persuaded Lily to skip school to hang out with him. He eventually convinced her to have sex with him. The statutory rape resulted in Kevin giving Lily chlamydia, a common sexually transmitted disease. Colleen Carlton, Lily's best friend, hated Kevin and Lily's relationship and often told Kevin how she felt. In return, Kevin attempted to kill Colleen by locking her in the refrigerator at local restaurant, Gina's, and then setting it on fire. He was never found guilty for these crimes. However, in 2004, while working as a bookkeeper at Marilyn's Cabaret, Kevin was wrongly accused of electrocuting Brittany Hodges. Desperate to avoid jail time, Kevin turned to his half-brother, Michael, for help. They were soon joined by their mother, Gloria, after Kevin ran away back home to Detroit, fearing that he would be sent to jail. Gloria decided to return with Kevin and Michael after Michael made a deal with the police. Later, Kevin was sent to prison, where he was beaten to a pulp by cellmates because they knew that he committed statutory rape. Later, Kevin befriended Daniel Romalotti, who just returned to Genoa City from boarding school, and MacKenzie Browning. Mac was a very good friend to Kevin, and she persuaded him to seek counseling to become a better person. Michael won some money in the lottery and gave Kevin some money to enter a partnership with Mac and purchase Crimson Lights Coffee House from Nicholas Newman and his wife, Sharon Newman. Kevin's abusive father, "Terrible Tom" Fisher, surfaced in 2005 and Kevin was forced to relive the memories of the physical and emotional violence that Tom inflicted upon him as a child. Tom was later shot by John Abbott, who later died in prison while serving time for the killing.

In 2006, Mac left town after a bad break up with J.T. Hellstrom, and Kevin was left to run Crimson Lights alone. Shortly after Mac left, Kevin began dating new Crimson Lights worker, Jana Hawkes. Kevin and Jana married and it was later revealed that, suffering from a brain tumor, Jana had killed Carmen Mesta. She was freed from jail after being found not responsible for her actions due to her medical condition. In February 2007, Jana staged the kidnapping of herself and Colleen and set up Kevin for kidnapping and attempted murder. Kevin and Jana reunited after it was revealed that Jana's brain tumor had caused her deranged behavior. Kevin proposed to Jana on Thanksgiving Day. Months later, the two were married in an Ashram in Malibu, California, by a guru who turned out to be Michael's father, Lowell "River" Baldwin. Lowell was later revealed to be a con man. Later, Katherine was kidnapped by Clint Radison, with whom she'd had trouble twenty years earlier. As Clint and his accomplices, Roger and Annie Wilkes, held Katherine and her maid, Esther Valentine, hostage in a motel, Kevin and Amber Moore managed to track them down. However, Kevin was tricked by Clint and drugged. The three criminals took photos of Kevin holding a bomb to make it seem as if he was planning to blow up the motel with Katherine and Esther inside. Kevin was then locked in a closet where he was forced to relive the abuse he suffered as a child from "Terrible Tom." Meanwhile, Kay and Esther were rescued by Gloria and Amber. While being held hostage, Kevin (wearing a giant chipmunk mascot head) was ordered to rob banks. Clint had a sudden heart attack and died. Amber soon found Kevin, who was not in his right mind. She was taken hostage by Kevin and forced to rob a bank with him. Kevin and Amber were arrested and Michael had Kevin admitted for psychological evaluation. While Kevin was going through his own problems, Jana had her fair share of misfortunes as well; she and Lauren Fenmore were kidnapped by Kevin's half-siblings, Daisy Carter and Ryder Callahan, and locked in a cage at an amusement park. After their rescue, Kevin was devastated to discover that Jana had begun an affair with Ryder.

Kevin then found a friend in Chloe Mitchell, who was dealing with some devastation of her own after breaking up with her fiance, Chance Chancellor, after he revealed to her that he had had a one-night stand with Heather Stevens. Jana became jealous of Kevin and Chloe's growing closeness. Jana, still wanting Kevin for herself, kidnapped Daniel's daughter, Lucy, and Chloe's daughter, Delia. Kevin told Jana to let the girls go and she then took Kevin hostage and forced him go into a closet, making him again relive "Terrible Tom's" abuse. Jana ended up dying in a struggle with Chloe, who had come to rescue Kevin. Jana's autopsy revealed she had died of natural causes. As Chloe and Kevin were to get married he called it off after Angelina Veneziano convinced him her boyfriend Carmine was after Kevin and that he and Angelina were in danger. Kevin told Chloe they could not get married at that time, leaving her heartbroken. First Kevin and Angelina ran off to a hotel room in Niagara Falls. Angelina then revealed the truth to Kevin: she put the whole scheme together in hopes he would fall in love with her while on the run. Meanwhile, Anglina's mobster father, Angelo, sent a goon, Dino, to find them and kill Kevin. Angelina told her father over the phone that she and Kevin were getting married. Kevin and Angelina were forced into marrying each other in front of Dino in order to save Kevin's life. Back in Genoa City, Kevin told Chloe why he had to leave her at the altar. He lets her know that there was never any doubt in his mind about their relationship whatsoever, that she is the one he wants to be with, not Angelina. Eventually, Angelina released Kevin from the marriage. Kevin and Chloe stop Gloria from marrying Angelo and Michael announces that Kevin's marriage to Angelina has been annulled. Jeffrey and Kevin then get down on their knees and propose to both Gloria and Chloe, who both accept. Both couples marry on March 27, 2012. Kevin and Chloe get married and turn their attention to running Crimson Lights. Their marriage falls apart after Delia dies, but Kevin still stays friends with Chloe worried about her mental well-being. Chloe briefly returns to Genoa City on the one-year anniversary of Delia's death. She reveals to Kevin that she had been given a 24-hour pass from the clinic in order to visit the accident site. She tells Kevin that she also does not plan on returning to Genoa City, instead wishing to begin a new life somewhere else, without Kevin and her family. As she leaves, she rubs her pregnant belly, assuring Delia that her emptiness would once again by fulfilled, believing that the child is Billy's when it could also be Kevin's. She returns again in 2016, working as an outside aid to Victor under the alias of Dorothy Gale, helping plot out his revenge against Adam. When Victor ends up shot and in the hospital, Chloe unveils herself and confesses that she and her daughter, Bella, will be making a permanent return to Genoa City, to make sure Adam ultimately pays for his crimes, once and for all. She later shoots Adam and orchestrates an explosion, leading to his death, but covers up her involvement in the ordeal with Victor's help. After returning to Genoa City permanently with her daughter, Chloe reconnects with Kevin and Chelsea as she and Kevin prepare to remarry. However, Nick Newman expresses suspicion to Chelsea over Chloe's possible role in Adam's death and her crimes are revealed at her wedding to Kevin; once again with Victor's help, she arranges to disappear again. Meanwhile, Bella is revealed as Kevin's biological daughter. Chloe later fakes her death and brings Kevin into her scheme, convincing him it was the only way for them to be a family with their daughter. They move to Portland, Oregon under different names and disappear; however, Kevin later returns to Genoa City with Bella, with no mention of Chloe's whereabouts as she is believed to be dead.
