= Greg Rikaart =

American actor (born 1977)

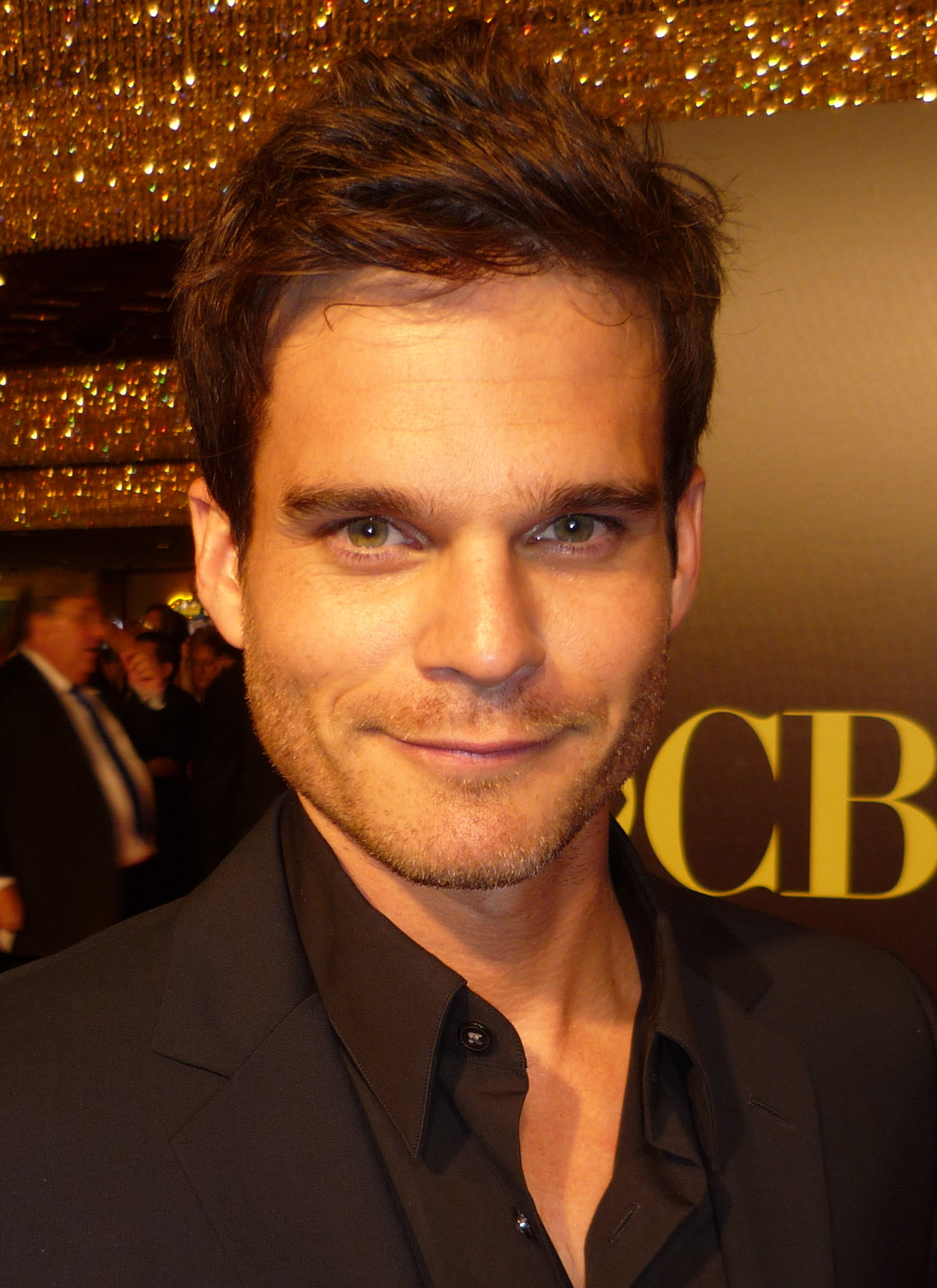
- Rikaart in 2010
- Born: Gregory Andrew Rikaart; February 26, 1977 (age 49); New York City, U.S.
- Education: Villanova University
- Occupation: Actor
- Years active: 1999–present
- Spouse: Robert Sudduth (m. 2015)
- Children: 1

Gregory Andrew Rikaart (born February 26, 1977) is an American television actor. He is best known for playing Kevin Fisher on the television soap opera The Young and the Restless since 2003, and also playing Leo Stark on Days Of Our Lives.

Rikaart has received six nominations for the Daytime Emmy Award for Outstanding Supporting Actor in a Drama Series and won once in 2005.

== Early life ==
Rikaart was born and raised in New York City; born in Brooklyn and raised in New Springville, Staten Island. He graduated with honors from Villanova University in Pennsylvania. He has a sister, Keri. While in college, he spent a semester in Washington, D.C., as an intern for a congressman on Capitol Hill.

== Career ==
Rikaart is best known for his role as Kevin Fisher on the CBS daytime soap opera The Young and the Restless, which he originated in 2003. In May 2017, Rikaart confirmed earlier reports that he would be exiting the soap with his last taping date to be the following month. However, on August 3, the official Twitter account for The Young and the Restless confirmed Rikaart was back taping. In September, Entertainment Weekly reported that Rikaart was back for a 2-week stint.

Beginning in 2018 Rikaart has portrayed the character Leo Stark, on Days of Our Lives.

He has hosted the podcast called Soapy with Rebecca Budig premiered on June 8, 2025, and the first special guest is Eric Braeden.

== Personal life ==
In June 2013, Rikaart revealed that he was in a committed relationship with writer Robert Sudduth. Rikaart posted a photograph with his boyfriend captioned, "Not getting married anytime soon, but celebrating #equality tonight nonetheless", in response to the 2013 United States Supreme Court decisions in favor of same-sex marriage equality.

Rikaart and Sudduth married in Maui, Hawaii, on May 9, 2015. Their first child, a son named Montgomery, was born June 12, 2016, via surrogacy.

== Filmography ==
Year	Series	Role	Notes
1999	Felicity	Art Student	Episode: "Portraits"
2000	Strong Medicine	Traylor	Episode: "BRCA2"
2000	Gilmore Girls	Kid #4	Episode: "Rory's Birthday Parties"
2001	Grounded for Life	Jason	Episode: "Dream on"
2001	That's Life	Waiter	Episode: "Sex in the Suburbs"
2002	As If	Josh	Episode: "Alex's POV"
2002–2003	Dawson's Creek	David	Recurring role, 7 episodes
2003	Prey for Rock & Roll	Scott	Movie
2003	X2	Museum Teenager #2	Movie
2003	Fake Stacy	Josh Patterson	Short
2003–present	The Young and the Restless	Kevin Fisher	Series regular (2003–2017); Recurring role (2017–present)
2005	The Closer	Craig Sherman	Episode: "L.A. Woman"
2005	Wannabe	Trevor FYI	Movie
2007	CSI: Miami	Scott LeBrock	Episode: "Chain Reaction"
2008	Imaginary Bitches	Mark	Episode: "It's Totally What You Think"
2009	Seeds	Paul	Short
2013	Bones	Jeffrey Baxter	Episode: "The Cheat in the Retreat"
2013	Four Brothers. Or Three. Wait ... Three.	Greg	Short
2015	Major Crimes	Bobby G. Monroe	Season 4, episodes 4, 13, 16 & 17
2018–2020; 2022–present	Days of Our Lives	Leo Stark	Contract role; Guest (2020)
2021	Days of Our Lives: Beyond Salem	Leo Stark	Limited series
2021	Days of Our Lives: A Very Salem Christmas	Leo Stark	Movie

== Awards and nominations ==
List of awards and nominations for Greg Rikaart
Year	Award	Category	Work	Result	Ref.
2005	Daytime Emmy Award	Outstanding Supporting Actor in a Drama Series	The Young and the Restless	Won	
2005	Soap Opera Digest Award	Outstanding Younger Lead Actor	The Young and the Restless	Nominated	
2006	Daytime Emmy Award	Outstanding Supporting Actor in a Drama Series	The Young and the Restless	Nominated	
2007	Daytime Emmy Award	Outstanding Supporting Actor in a Drama Series	The Young and the Restless	Nominated	
2008	Daytime Emmy Award	Outstanding Supporting Actor in a Drama Series	The Young and the Restless	Nominated	
2009	Daytime Emmy Award	Outstanding New Approaches - (Daytime Entertainment) (shared with others/credited as a Performer)	Imaginary Bitches	Nominated	
2018	Daytime Emmy Award	Outstanding Supporting Actor in a Drama Series	The Young and the Restless	Nominated	
2019	Daytime Emmy Award	Outstanding Supporting Actor in a Drama Series	Days of Our Lives	Nominated	
2025	Daytime Emmy Award	Outstanding Lead Actor in a Drama Series	Days of Our Lives	Nominated	
