= Devon Hamilton and Hilary Curtis =

Devon and Hilary
- The Young and the Restless character
- Bryton James and Mishael Morgan as Devon and Hilary
- Duration: 2013–18
- Created by: Jean Passanante and Shelly Altman (Note: While seeds for the couple's story were planted during Josh Griffith's tenure, Devon and Hilary's actual romance doesn't start until the summer of 2014 during Passanante and Altman's tenure.)
- Introduced by: Jill Farren Phelps
In-universe information
- Other names: Hevon
- Family: Chancellor; Winters
- Spouse: 2015–17, 2018
- Children: unnamed child (miscarried, 2018)

Devon Hamilton and Hilary Curtis are fictional characters and a supercouple from the American CBS soap opera, The Young and the Restless. Devon Hamilton, portrayed by Bryton James is the biological grandson of the show's iconic matriarch, Katherine Chancellor, portrayed by Jeanne Cooper and the adopted son of Neil Winters and Drucilla Winters, played by Kristoff St. John and Victoria Rowell. Hilary Curtis, portrayed by Mishael Morgan was introduced in 2013 as a woman looking for revenge on Neil and the Winters family for Neil's part in her mother's death.

The couple quickly rose to popularity in the summer of 2014 as they began a forbidden affair soon after Hilary's wedding to Neil. The duo faces several obstacles including Hilary being intimidated by Devon's billion-dollar inheritance, Devon believing Hilary is interested in other men, their trepidation in hurting Neil, Hilary's disappearance on their honeymoon, her kidnapping and subsequent memory loss at Neil's hands and Hilary's consistent lying driving Devon away.

Devon and Hilary were first called super couples when they started their affair and they are commonly referred to by the portmanteau "Hevon" in magazines, on social media, and internet message boards. Viewers and critics have praised the undeniable chemistry between the characters which is credited as the reason for the duo's success—despite inconsistencies in the writing. The duo has been compared to William Shakespeare's Romeo and Juliet. Devon and Hilary also won the Fan Favorite Award for "Most Romantic Duo" at the 42nd Daytime Emmy Awards in 2015 and the plot earned Bryton James a Daytime Emmy Award nomination Outstanding Supporting Actor in a Drama Series in 2016.

== Development ==
=== Creation ===
While the producers had not actually taken notice, Mishael Morgan actually suggested Devon and Hilary be paired together feeling as if there was a connection. When Morgan predicted that their characters would end up together, James couldn't see it because Devon hated Hilary for going after his family. James finally saw the potential when a producer told how good they looked together. When Devon finally does confront Hilary about her actions, Morgan plays up that Hilary is "hurt" despite the truth of his accusations because she cares what he thinks. Having recently turned her life around, Devon manages to forgive Hilary for her past transgressions against his family. By the end of 2013, Devon and Hilary have bonded and according to Morgan, Hilary brings excitement to Devon's life. It would be the very first "love story" for the character of Devon. In a 2017 interview, Morgan revealed that she felt her existing friendship with Bryton translated well onscreen. "A couple [of] months before we started shooting anything related to 'Hevon' we would go out for lunch, and I think that that bleeds through."

=== Background ===
While relatives sharing love interests is not unusual in soaps, for the Barber and Winters families, it had become a main staple in stories. Throughout the 1990s and 2000s, brothers Neil and Malcolm Winters (Shemar Moore) shared love interests several times. The two are best known for their quadrangle with sisters Olivia (Tonya Lee Williams) and Drucilla Barber (Victoria Rowell). Malcolm's one-night-stand with Dru during her marriage to Neil results in daughter Lily (Christel Khalil) – raised by Neil. Neil later has an affair with Malcolm's fiancée Alex Perez (Alexia Robinson). In 2011, Neil's affair with Malcolm's (then Darius McCrary) estranged fiancée Sofia Dupre (Julia Pace Mitchell) results in her pregnancy and her eventual divorce from Malcolm.

The plot device is utilized again with Devon and Neil when Devon has a one-night stand with Neil's former mistress Tyra (Eva Marcille). James defends Devon reminding viewers that Neil and Tyra's relationship was an extramarital affair while also taking into account Devon's age, romantic inexperience and immaturity at the time of his tryst with Tyra and that Devon did not make mistakes like that often, unlike Neil. James relished in the idea of Devon battling Neil for Hilary's affections as it put the father-son duo at odds for a change and because Devon could come at Neil as his equal.

=== Friendship and true love ===
While James worried about potential backlash because of the affair, the actors agreed it helped that Devon and Hilary's attraction was well established for viewers prior to her involvement with Neil. After Hilary saves the young billionaire from identity theft at the hands of her former accomplice, Mason (Lamon Archey) and defends him against ruthless paparazzi, they end up spending Christmas and New Year's Eve together. Devon also defends Hilary against Lily's attacks. The friendship makes the attraction seem like a "natural thing" Morgan explained. Devon sees beyond Hilary's flaws and accepts her. Though the relationship seems like "old hat" for the Winters family, the actors and the writers insisted that Devon and Hilary shared undeniable true love. Devon is the kind of guy that Hilary will always be in love with Morgan explained; they have that "having sex on the kitchen floor love!" Hilary's feelings for Devon are a "different kind of love" because he provides the "excitement" and "adventure" that Hilary enjoys. James believed the couple has "true love" and though they're betraying Neil, "it's the classic story -- you can't help who you fall in love with." Devon doesn't intend to hurt Neil, but his connection to Hilary is so strong that it is worth the sacrifice. Morgan likened the dynamic to "Romeo and Juliet" and said, "[Devon is] the love of her life." James hoped the pairing would take on the original super couple formula of splitting up and always reuniting but still having undying fan support.

== Storylines ==
=== Obstacles and triangle with Neil ===
Devon and Hilary face several obstacles before becoming a couple. According to James, Devon initially has to work up the courage to tell Hilary how he feels and Morgan said they avoid owning their feelings "for whatever reason." Devon is very straightforward about his attraction and even asks her on a date twice, with Hilary ultimately saying they should remain friends. When Devon tries to confront Hilary again, he overhears her in bed with someone else—however, he doesn't know it's Neil. Besides the bad "timing," Devon's jealousy over Hilary's apparent attraction to her boss Jack Abbott (Peter Bergman) sends him into the arms of Esmeralda (Briana Nicole Henry). While Esmeralda assumes Devon and Hilary are sleeping together, Hilary doesn't know Devon's fling with Esmeralda is a direct response to her kiss with Jack; but Hilary believes there is no future for them. While Devon's new billionaire status makes him seem like the obvious choice, the money scares the reformed Hilary away. It would look suspicious if Hilary chose to pursue Devon after putting him in the "friend zone".

Neil vs. Devon

There are such benefits to both of them! Neil is a man who is established and who is very admirable and has lived so much of his life, and he can teach her so much and help her grow as a person. And then you have Devon. He’s younger, he’s her peer and they can grow together which would be an interesting dynamic too.

— Mishael Morgan, Soaps.com

The most significant obstacle for the couple is Hilary's brief romance and sudden marriage to Neil. Then head writer Jean Passanante described it as a "great big mess, with much story opportunity" because of Hilary's dynamic with each member of the Winters family. Upon discovering Neil and Hilary's affair, Devon is "kicking himself" for not pursuing Hilary hard enough. It would be impossible for Devon not to be affected by Hilary's relationship with Neil. Morgan was surprised because she thought the triangle would involve Mason instead. Furious at the sight of them together, Devon exposes the relationship to Lily and her husband Cane (Daniel Goddard), accuses Hilary of using Neil to work out her "daddy (and mommy) issues." Hilary and Neil's romance increases the tension between Devon and Hilary. Devon pines away as Neil and Hilary take several major steps in their relationship including moving in together and becoming engaged within a matter of weeks—which Devon is against. Lily later encourages the newly single Devon to seduce Hilary but he rejects the idea. Meanwhile, Cane urges Devon to confront his feelings before it's too late and Devon kisses Hilary the night before her wedding to Neil and gets rejected. Hilary is tortured by Devon's admission because she can't deny that she feels the same way but she thinks marrying Neil will do away with her feelings for Devon. However, Hilary reminisces about the kiss as she and Neil are pronounced man and wife on June 25, 2014. While Devon intends to stop the wedding knowing the attraction is mutual, he also wants spare Neil's feelings. When a drunken Devon crashes their wedding party, Hilary traps him in an elevator hoping to talk some sense into him and she is terrified by his sudden profession of love.

Unable to deny his feelings, Devon baits Hilary by announcing that he is leaving town hoping she will stop him—though he expects rejection. But when Hilary begs him to stay and they nearly sleep together, they agree that his leaving would be best. This time, it is Neil that convinces Devon to stay. Devon is "torn" between keeping quiet and coming clean—knowing Neil would be hurt by the lies. Devon refuses to tell Neil himself because he feels it is Hilary's place to speak with her husband. Devon gets Hilary to admit her feelings and they share a romantic night when they get stranded on the side of the road after his car breaks down; their bond grows even stronger. "They truly enjoy each other," James said. Meanwhile, Hilary has difficulty being intimate with Neil as Devon tries to move on by dating other women, making Hilary jealous. Devon gives Hilary an ultimatum promising to leave town for good unless she meets him at a bar outside of town. Shelly Altman said Devon and Hilary seem destined to be together. As Hilary confesses her love for Devon and they prepare to tell Neil, an accident leaves Neil blind.

=== The Affair and fallout ===
Devon and Hilary finally gave in and began sleeping together on September 17, 2014. Throughout the affair, Devon and Hilary are riddled with guilt, even more so when Neil is blind. They both feel obligated to Neil, for their unique reasons. Hilary stays with Neil because he serves as a constant reminder of her past misdeeds—that reminder keeps her on the straight and narrow. Hilary sticks with Neil out of obligation because the recovering alcoholic fills the void of her late alcoholic mother and abandoning him would feel like abandoning Rose all over again. Also, Neil is the "stable" choice for Hilary who fears Devon might not live up to her expectations. Hilary feels guilty not only for rushing the relationship but also because he is so good to her—she doesn't want to hurt her hero. Once he is blind, Hilary can't abandon Neil when he needs her most. Devon is also afraid to hurt his hero because Neil saved Devon's life by giving him a home. Neil is the first man Devon has ever called father and he doesn't want to crush him.

Cane discovers the affair and urges them to end it while Cane's father Colin Atkinson (Tristan Rogers) blackmails Devon for money in exchange for his silence. Hilary enlists nerdy accountant by day Gwen Randall (Nadine Nicole) to pose as Devon's girlfriend and Devon ends up sleeping with Gwen when Neil falsely leads him to believe that he and Hilary are trying to have a baby. Neil discovering Hilary's birth control is just a preview of how complicated things can get. However, Devon is prepared to deal with the fallout and is willing to fight to find happiness. Devon and Hilary go to extreme "emotional lengths" to protect each other which solidifies their love. When Devon wants to wait until Neil can adjust to the news of his blindness being permanent, Hilary begins to crack under pressure because she feels "powerless." During a business trip, Neil confronts them and they end up stranded during a blizzard after their plane crashes. The crash mirrors the destruction of the splintered family. Head writer Charles Pratt, Jr. used the crash along with several other disasters as a way to reset the canvas. Pratt also revealed he had gotten the impression that the actors involved felt the material had gotten repetitive so he wanted to progress the story. Hilary's first instinct is to try to make amends and she shockingly claims that she never loved Devon or Neil and started the affair to hurt Neil. Devon and Hilary are forced to team up to help the alcoholic Neil avoid prison when he causes a car accident that kills Paul Williams (Doug Davidson) and Christine Blair (Lauralee Bell)'s unborn child which culminates in Hilary seducing and blackmailing the assistant district attorney.

=== Marriage and Hilary's disappearance ===
With Neil free, Hilary can't hide her feelings and reveals that she left Devon to give him a chance at salvaging a relationship with his family. They reunite, but not wanting to repeat their past mistakes, they go public with the relationship. Pratt said Hilary and Devon would pursue their love even if it means losing their loved ones. Devon and Hilary become engaged in June 2015 after her divorce, as Neil plots revenge. Neil has Colin drug Devon at his bachelor party and record him going to bed with a hooker. Devon is so distraught that he snaps at Hilary during the wedding planning. Lily forces him to admit what happened and convinces him to keep quiet because he doesn't know what happened. Colin intends to blackmail Devon for money, however, at the last minute, Neil changes his mind and orders Colin to delete the video and gives his blessing as Devon and Hilary wed on August 17, 2015. Devon has plans to come clean himself but changes his mind at the altar. Neil interrupts the ceremony to give his blessing. Devon and Hilary are finally married and leave on their honeymoon to Virgin Gorda. James said the couple's wedding really "solidifies them." However, Neil follows them and confronts Hilary with the video of Devon going to bed with a prostitute and Hilary doesn't believe it. Though Devon is worried when he doesn't hear from Hilary, he becomes the prime suspect when Hilary goes missing. Devon returns to Genoa City to avoid being arrested and unbeknownst to him and everyone else, Neil follows the couple on their honeymoon. After his failed attempt to turn Hilary against Devon, she runs from him and falls off a cliff forcing Neil to save her. Neil secretly flies Hilary back to the United States where he hires Dr. Simon Neville (Michael E. Knight) to awaken her from a coma. After months of failed attempts to locate Hilary, Devon, and Hilary are reunited when she turns up at the hospital but she is suffering from amnesia and believes she is still married to Neil leaving Devon devastated. Devon is furious to learn Neil is behind Hilary's kidnapping and plans to turn him in when Hilary talks him out of it. After Devon walks in on Hilary and Neil sleeping together, he serves her with divorce papers but she suddenly remembers her feelings for Devon and refuses to sign them.

=== Trust issues and divorce ===
Though he hesitates to trust, Devon and Hilary team up with Neil and Ashley Abbott (Eileen Davidson) to develop Neville's miracle drug. Meanwhile, Hilary also convinces Devon to donate to Jack and Neil's foundation in support of rehabilitation centers and she also vies for a seat on the board of directors but Devon interferes fearing the trouble she could cause. Hilary's health begins to decline and she collapses in Devon's arms and they learn she is dying. Devon fires Neville and gets another doctor to save his wife. It is later revealed that Hilary bribed a lab technician to falsify reports to rush the drug to market. To avoid a lawsuit, Devon and Hilary settle out of court with the victims of the failed medical trial. In September 2016, Devon buys the GC Buzz and makes plans to shut it down until Hilary convinces him to keep it on the air and just change the way they tell stories. Devon goes a step further and decides to make Hilary lead anchor. Hilary becomes obsessed with keeping viewers happy and spiking ratings which goes against Devon's wishes of telling stories without destroying people's lives. Meanwhile, Devon enlist Hilary's new assistant Mariah Copeland (Camryn Grimes) to help keep Hilary on the straight and narrow. Hilary and Mariah clash over how to handle the revelation that her mother Sharon Newman (Sharon Case) has secretly been raising her ex-husband Nick's (Joshua Morrow) presumed dead son. When Hilary edits an interview with Sharon's husband Dylan McAvoy (Steve Burton) to smear Sharon to get back at Mariah, a furious Devon fires her. According to Bryton James, Devon reaches his breaking point because "She's twisting people's words, and Devon won't stand for that." While Hilary doesn't take back the job when Devon offers after a failed attempt at hiring Mariah, they reconcile and Devon buys a new home for the two of them. The plot featured a guest appearance from Housewives of Beverly Hills star Erika Girardi as the couple's real-estate agent. After Lily exposes that Hilary has been lying about fielding other job offers to trick Devon into rehiring her, the couple agrees to a fresh start and being completely honest. But when Mariah exposes that Hilary lied about being responsible for her fall during a charity gala, a furious Devon leaves Hilary. Hilary doesn't know what to expect when Devon disappears because they've always been able to "hash things out" by talking—but this time he wasn't interested in an explanation. Neil gets Hilary to understand that her consistent dishonesty might have pushed Devon away for good. As Hilary struggles to figure out how to reconcile with Devon, she learns Devon has been badly injured in a car accident. However, Devon does not remember the incident due to a concussion, and Hilary is quite relieved but still worried she will lose in the end. Devon regains his memory and leaves Hilary but convinces her to co-host GC Buzz with Mariah. According to James, Devon is testing himself "and see if he can be strong enough and smart enough" to separate his personal life from business. Devon is shocked when Hilary serves him with divorce papers that don't include a big settlement James explained. But Hilary's prior threats about taking half of his fortune make Devon question her sincerity. According to Morgan, Hilary's motives are innocent—she wants to reassure Devon that she was never after his money and that she is still the woman he fell in love with. Though she wants to be proven "right", Mishael Morgan said that Hilary is terrified that she will lose "the love of her life" if Devon signs. Instead, Devon offers Hilary a $250 million divorce settlement if she signs -- "It's a test" James revealed. Morgan described the dynamic as "a game of chess." Devon and Hilary ultimately divorce in April 2017.

== Reception and impact ==
=== Critical ===
TVSource Best Couples

They are vibrant, fun, sexy, and filled with so much chocolaty goodness it gives us a toothache. The Young and the Restless would be smart to market this pairing and use them as an anchor for storylines in their age group. The late 20s/early 30s set has a boredom issue, and Hevon is the cure to that.

— TVSource Magazine (2014)

Commonly known by the portmanteau "Hevon" (Hilary + Devon), the couple's popularity skyrocketed rather quickly and they received nearly universal critical praise. Soaps in Depth took notice of their chemistry in their very scenes in August 2013. TV Fanatic's also praised the chemistry and urged the writers to go forward with a romantic pairing. Jeevan Brar of The TV Watercooler said Hevon was "the show's best new pairing in years." Luke Kerr of Daytime Confidential said "Hilary (Mishael Morgan) and Devon (Bryton James) are making a splash" as the show's "next epic super couple" despite the dramatic decline in "super couple" worthy pairings in daytime as a whole. Nelson Branco listed Devon and Hilary as "Best Couple" in 2014, while the pairing also appeared on the "Best Couples" list for both Daytime Confidential and TVSource Magazine in 2014.

Hevon Must Be Missing Angels

The dawn of long marriages seems to have passed in soap operadom. Sad but true. Perhaps Hevon is one of the few potential young pairings that can break this pattern, this notion that supercouples are extinct.

— Gingersnap, Femfilmrogue

Writer Gingersnap praised the decision to pair the African American Hilary with an African American male, instead of reverting to the typical interracial pairing. She declared "Urban drama, angst, and sexy off the charts chemistry galore has come right back to Y&R with a fiery diligence!" While Gingersnap insisted that there was nothing wrong with interracial love, she said "I'm sick of black women being valued and rewarded only when white [men] desire them and vice versa for black men." The writer also credited James and Morgan's acting with making her believe that Devon is Hilary's "soul mate" and likened the pairing to the "brown skinned Romeo Montague to brown skinned Juliet Capulet." She continued, "You know a couple is worth weight in pure gold if the actors can have great eye sex.… Even if they only have a three minute scene without uttering dialogue to one another. It's that abyssal deep." She later explained of the couple: "Alas Hilary and Devon's story brought seeded a hope that brown skinned woman could be coveted by a brown skinned man, desirable, wanted and appreciated. Devon worshiped Hilary like a queen, a goddess. To see these characters show affection, to kiss was beautiful, a representation humanizing an experience rarely depicted, shedding light on Hilary and Devon as a phenomenon, as a promised beacon in the predominately white driven daytime world." Ashley Dionne said that the pairing gave fans "the audacity to hope." While previous writing regimes did not recognize it, "Devon Hamilton is a catch" Dionne stated. "James has proven that along with the sometimes emotional storylines he's been given, he can also be the romantic daytime hunk his fans knew he would be if given the chance." Sean O'Brien from Soap Opera Spy applauded James and Morgan for their consistent portrayal. "They've taken scripts from various writers and created solid on-screen chemistry." he stated. O'Brien continued, "When all snarky provocative paragraphs have ended, the honest assertion of this scribe is that ‘Hevon’ is great entertainment!" Soaps In Depth praised the duo's "painfully honest" break-up in 2017. Meanwhile, Sean O'Brien argued that the plot seemed "trumped up." He continued that if not for the writers' obvious intentions on changing the couple's dynamic, the "overreaction" from Devon wouldn't "add up." He argued that the writers "pushed Devon to act out of character" to push Devon and Mariah together.

Devon and Hilary's affair received positive reviews while response to triangle with Neil was mixed. Jeevan Brar listed Devon and Hilary's affair as one of the "Best" Soap Moments in 2014. Brar said "Y&R has given fans an actual couple to root for in 2014 after many pairings that were quickly thrown together without any emotional attachment from the viewers or the characters." Daytime Confidential listed the affair at #7 on its list of the "10 Best Soap Storylines of 2014." TV Guide's Michael Logan described the triangle as "Daytime's hottest and juiciest mess." Carol Cassada of Bubble News admitted that the storyline with Hilary made her invest in the character of Devon and root for the pairing of Devon and Hilary. Navell Lee of BuzzWorthy Radio also praised the storyline as "one of the hottest love triangles on “Y&R” to date." However, Soaps In Depth disapproved of the writers completely doing away with Hilary's feelings for Neil. "A triangle made up of two equally appealing couples is a triangle that can run years!" Stephanie Sloane, editor of Soap Opera Digest hailed the duo's split as "mature, relatable drama." Sloane continued, "It was darn good soap, stripped back to basics."

=== Popularity ===
Out of Focus

It's rare nowawadys on soaps that two people have the fire-filled passion that burns between Devon and Hilary. I hope the writers realize it soon and continue to invest in this pairing. They have so much potential as a G.C. power couple, and I would love to see them start a family soon. But at the moment, Hilary and Devon are sorely missed on my screen!

— Soap Opera Digest (2017)

Mishael Morgan herself credited fans as the reason for the couple's existence. Less than a year after they first shared the screen together, and even before they were officially a couple, Devon and Hilary had amassed a very vocal fan base. By July 2014, James, Morgan and the pairing of Devon and Hilary made their debuts in online fan polls from We Love Soaps and TVSource Magazine. In September 2014, Devon and Hilary debuted on the CBS Soaps in Depth fan poll. The duo peaked would eventually peak at #1 on the TVSource poll in November 2014 and January 2015 on both the couples and the actors polls. "Hevon" were voted the #1 couple in the February 23, 2015 issue of CBS Soaps In Depth interrupting Cane and Lily's nearly three year long reign on top of the poll while James and Morgan were both voted #1 on the "Top 5" actors and actresses polls. The pairing ranked at #10 on We Love Soaps list of the 25 Most Popular Couples for the year and were the only Y&R pairing to rank in the top 10, and the only African American to make the list overall. Devon and Hilary won the Fan Favorite Award for "Most Romantic Duo" at the 42nd Daytime Emmy Awards in 2015. Morgan admitted that she thought her character would be killed off in the plane crash while James said that their substantial fan base made them safe. 64% of Soaps In Depth readers believed Devon and Hilary could make a relationship work, despite their past. Most readers thought the pair had strong "enough chemistry" to survive anything. While the affair turned some viewers against the pairing—most viewers began rooting for the couple again once the affair was exposed. Lauren R. of Chicago was "thrilled" at the focus on the couple's internal marital struggles in early 2017. "The chemistry is smoking between them, whether it's during a steamy love scene or a heated argument!" However, the viewer criticized the writers as the duo disappeared for several weeks with no follow up after. Gingersnp of Femfilmrogue said "'Hevon' were so popular, they topped polls and covered soap magazines, becoming the Angie and Jesse of our generation."

=== Controversy ===
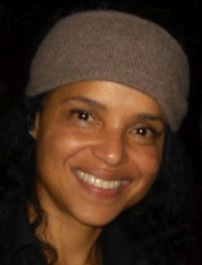
In February 2015, actress Victoria Rowell (ex-Drucilla Winters) launched a lawsuit against the series and the network citing racism behind the scenes.

However, Ashley Dionne of TVSource Magazine blasted the writers for the quick shift when the pairing was seemingly abandoned in favor of Neil and Hilary when Josh Griffith was replaced as head writer leaving Devon on the sidelines as Hilary and Neil started an affair, moved in together, professed their love and married within a span of 6 weeks. Not only did the writers incorrectly assume all viewers would believe Hilary could choose Neil over Devon, but Dionne also accused the writers of inserting a "proven lead" character like Neil because they didn't think Hevon was appealing enough on their own. Dionne questioned the decision to pair Neil and Hilary over Hevon despite Neil's string of failed pairings. According to Dionne, making Neil blind made it much worse. "Not because it kept Hilary and Devon apart, but because that was the SOLE purpose of the plot" she said. Though the writing encouraged viewers to sympathize with Neil, "The only thing [fans] saw was the heavy handed guilt trip the writers laid on anyone who dared to prefer Hilary with [Devon]" Dionne said. While Neil's motives in pursuing Hilary were clear, Hilary's motives were hard to understand and the character's point of view was never explained. Dionne argued that fans were "creeped out" by Neil and Hilary's relationship because without Hilary's point of view, it seemed like she was being manipulated. Next, the story became stagnate with the writers skipping various opportunities for progression while Hevon faced even more obstacles, interruptions and revising of history before even becoming an official couple.

Decreased airtime

We're not intentionally playing those actors less. But budget is budget. Money is money, and that affects some decisions. Sometimes a story is really thriving so other stories that are finishing up or moving into a new area will temporarily slow down. Actresses get pregnant. Certain things get in there and mess with us as we rebuild the show, but these characters and actors are of great importance to us.

— Charles Pratt Jr., TV Insider

Some critics and fans accused the writers of outright racism. Gingersnap blamed the writing when the couple's "great love" was overlooked or seemingly dismissed in Aaron Foley's article about diversity in daytime. Unlike her white counterparts, Hilary "was the only unhappily married." Gingersnap also viewed the writing as an "obvious attempt to dirty up a brown couple's forbidden love" by refusing to develop the couple beyond their early friendship before trying to water down their popularity with the affair. Dionne who voiced similar thoughts accused the writers of never truly investing in Devon and Hilary. Dionne said that while daytime had been lacking a young African American couple that was popular enough to be showcased as a much as their white counterparts—with Hevon, "Y&R has that right in the palm of their hands and are doing everything they can to demolish it. And for what?" After the plane crash, viewers saw a dramatic decline in airtime for all the African American characters—Devon and Hilary included which led to fan debate on social media accusing the writers of showing the pairing less because they are black. Gingersnap said the series had become a "Once A Week Minority Madhouse Exhibit." CBS Soaps In Depth also noted that while the issues with airtime seemed to improve once the network took notice of Devon and Hilary's popularity, the writers fell back into the pattern of only airing the Winters family once a week not long after. "They are yet again being written as also-rans." Head writer Chuck Pratt sparked further controversy when he seemingly attributed the lack of airtime to budgetary restraints and Mishael Morgan's real-life pregnancy. In January 2016, the creators of the couple's official fan site ceased operations indefinitely, feeling as if the writers and producers were not truly invested in writing for the couple outside of how they affected Neil. The site owners also accused Pratt of dismissing fan outcry by resetting the triangle, and having an amnesiac Hilary fall in love with Neil who had recently kidnapped her.

=== Fan campaign ===
Fansite on lack of airtime

There’s a bigger issue at hand here. Why, if there really are budget issues, is the Black family the first to be cut on The Young and the Restless? Why is Mishael being punished for being pregnant in 2015? Why is Pratt so shocked at the support for Hevon?

— Hevon Nation

On April 5, 2015, the couple's fan site Hevon Nation launched the "More for Hevon" Twitter campaign in hopes of increasing the pairing's airtime. While The Young and the Restless had been the number 1 ranked daytime drama for over 20 years, the fan site attributed the show's long-term success to the large portion of African American viewers. "We need to let CBS Daytime and YR know that receiving kudos for having black characters on their roster isn't enough. Where is the airtime? Where is the writing? Where is the investment?" While the campaign was initially scheduled to last for a week, the fans extended the campaign beyond the launch week to get attention of the producers to fix the situation. Participants who could not participate live due to other obligations were instructed to use TweetDeck to schedule Tweets to be sent out at specific times during the hours in which the series aired on a daily basis. The tweets were directed towards CBS Daytime as a whole including vice president Angelica McDaniel and Chuck Pratt. The fan site cited Pratt's controversial interview with Michael Logan as the reason for launching the campaign. "We saw the blatant lack of airtime and scenes. It was clear that the Winters and Devon/Hilary were not on Pratt’s list of characters to write for." By July 2015, the problems with airtime seemed to have worsened with James and Morgan being featured in only 12 out of 65 episodes during the months of April and June. Another bulletin from the site accused the producers of harboring "unconscious bias" incorrectly assuming viewers can't root for pairings who don't look like them. "It's not intentional. Most times it's not malicious. It's racism's gentler, kinder little brother. However, how else can you explain a couple as popular and beloved as Hevon being back burned and essentially erased at the height of their popularity?" The site owners also questioned the decision from a business standpoint considering the recent successes of prime time drama Empire and comedy Black-ish both of which had ethnically diverse casts.

== See also ==
- List of supercouples
