= Hilary Curtis =

Fictional character from the American CBS soap opera The Young and the Restless

- The Young and the Restless character
- Portrayed by: Mishael Morgan
- Duration: 2013–2019
- First appearance: June 14, 2013
- Last appearance: December 5, 2019
- Created by: Josh Griffith and Shelly Altman
- Introduced by: Jill Farren Phelps (2013); Anthony Morina and Josh Griffith (2019)
- Crossover appearances: The Price Is Right
In-universe information
- Other names: Ann Turner; Hilary Winters; Hilary Hamilton
- Occupation: Talk show Host; Celebrity Reporter; Research Spokeswoman; Executive Assistant
- Father: Richard Nealon
- Mother: Naya Benedict
- Adoptive mother: Rose Turner
- Sisters: Amanda Sinclair
- Half-sisters: Imani Benedict
- Spouse: Neil Winters (2014–2015); Devon Hamilton (2015–2017, 2018)
- Grandfathers: Sutton Ames
- Other relatives: Rose Turner

Hilary Curtis is a fictional character from the original CBS daytime soap opera The Young and the Restless portrayed by Mishael Morgan. The character was introduced by executive producer Jill Farren Phelps in 2013 under head writers Josh Griffith and Shelly Altman. Hilary comes to town as the seemingly innocent assistant to the CEO of Chancellor Industries Cane Ashby (Daniel Goddard) but it is soon revealed that she has a vendetta against Cane's father-in-law Neil Winters (Kristoff St. John), whom she blames for her mother's death. With the help of her accomplice Mason Wilder (Lamon Archey), Hilary takes pleasure in tormenting the entire Winters family by trying to get Neil to fall off the wagon and drugging Cane into her bed. After she is exposed, and finds forgiveness and compassion from Neil and Jack Abbott (Peter Bergman), a grateful Hilary becomes involved with Neil despite developing feelings for his son Devon Hamilton (Bryton James). Hilary marries Neil in 2014 and begins an affair with Devon soon after. Hilary's actions ignite a feud with Neil's daughter and Cane's wife, Lily (Christel Khalil).

Despite their forbidden romance, Devon and Hilary garner quite a vocal fan base and are considered to be supercouple. Morgan's performance has been met with critical acclaim, having garnered her consecutive Daytime Emmy Award nominations for Outstanding Supporting Actress in a Drama Series in 2018 and 2019.

== Storylines ==
Hilary comes to town as Cane Ashby's new assistant at Chancellor Industries. In the meantime, an anonymous blogger targets Cane and his wife Lily's (Christel Khalil) entire family and even insinuates that Cane and Hilary are sleeping together. Hilary is working with Mason Wilder (Lamon Archey) to ruin the Winters family because she blames Neil Winters (Kristoff St. John) for her mother's death. Hilary goes so far as to serve liquor to the recovering alcoholic Neil. After Neil apologizes for his part in Rose's death and also forgives Hilary for her schemes, he helps her get a job at Jabot Cosmetics as Jack Abbott's (Peter Bergman) assistant. In December 2013, Hilary helps Devon uncover that Mason has stolen his identity and they become friendly. Hilary works Jack, his son Kyle (Hartley Sawyer) and Jill Abbott (Jess Walton) take Chancellor Industries from Victor Newman (Eric Braeden) and Kyle accuses Hilary of falling for Jack. Though she rejects the idea, Hilary impulsively kisses Jack at a Valentine's Day gala and he encourages her to act like it never happened. Hilary also badges Devon about his relationship with model Esmeralda (Briana Nicole Henry) and assuages him of his guilt after a hostage crisis at the club and they grow closer. Hilary clashes with Lily when Jack handpicks her to organize a fashion show at the club. Hilary later accompanies Neil to Los Angeles for a meeting with Forrester Creations where she fulfills her childhood dream of appearing on The Price Is Right. When she and Neil start an affair, Hilary convinces Neil to keep quiet until Devon exposes them. Neil convinces Hilary to move in with him despite his children's protest and they are married by late June 2014, the day after Hilary rejects Devon's kiss. Hilary follows a drunk Devon after he crashes her wedding reception and encourages him to move and he in turn professes his love for her. After Devon and Hilary nearly give in to their feelings on several occasions, Devon announces he is leaving town and Hilary stops him by admitting that she is in love with him too. As they are set to tell Neil about their feelings, he is blinded in a freak accident and they agree to wait until he recovers. However, Devon and Hilary cannot deny their feelings and begin their affair on September 17, 2014. Cane discovers the affair when Devon and Hilary sneak off to New York together and demands they end it. However, they continue seeing one another behind his back and are discovered by Cane's father Colin (Tristan Rogers) and Colin blackmails Devon for cash.

To keep Lily, Neil, and Cane from questioning Devon about his love life, Hilary enlists Jabot accountant Gwen Randall (Nadine Nicole) to pose as Devon's girlfriend. Meanwhile, Hilary tricks Neil into believing she wants a child which upsets Devon and he finds comfort with Gwen. As they realize it is only a misunderstanding, Hilary struggles to keep the secret any longer and Devon asks her to keep quiet until Neil can adjust to the news that his condition may be permanent. However, Neil regains his sight and confronts them during a plane ride to Chicago just as the plane crashes. Hilary then claims that she never loved Devon or Neil and only slept with Devon to finish her plan of destroying the Winters family. When a drunken Neil causes a car accident that kills the unborn child of district attorney Christine Blair (Lauralee Bell), Hilary seduces the assistant DA Winston Mobley (Ryan Caltagirone) and blackmails him into recommending a suspended sentence for Neil instead of prison. Hilary then confesses that she lied and dumped Devon so he could salvage his relationship with his family. Neil divorces Hilary and she and Devon marry in August 2015. Their happiness is short-lived as Neil follows them and fails to convince Hilary that Devon has cheated on her. In an attempt to get away, Hilary falls over a cliff and Neil saves her. He then hires Doctor Simon Neville (Michael E. Knight) to bring Hilary out of her comatose state. However, Hilary awakens believing she is still married to Neil, and rejects Devon. Neil later confesses to being responsible for Hilary's disappearance and Hilary forgives and narrowly convinces Devon not to turn him in. Hilary sleeps with Neil in January 2016 and Devon serves her with divorce papers. However, she refuses to sign them and claims to have had a change of heart. Though he is reluctant to trust her, Devon and Hilary reconcile. Hilary later convinces Devon to invest in Neville's medical research project and donate to Jack and Neil's new foundation in support of rehabilitation centers as she vies for a seat on the board. Hilary is furious when she learns Devon instructed Neil to keep her off the boarding fearing the trouble she could cause. However, they reconcile when Hilary collapses in Devon's arms and they learn Hilary is dying from Neville's experimental drugs.

Devon fires Neville and brings in another doctor to save his wife. It is later revealed that Hilary bribed a lab technician to falsify reports and rush the drug to market. To avoid a lawsuit, Devon and Hilary settle out of court with victims of the failed medical trial. In September 2016, Devon and Hilary embark on another business venture together when he buys the GC Buzz and hires Hilary as the host. Hilary becomes obsessed with keeping viewers happy and spiking ratings which goes against their initial plan of telling stories without destroying people's lives. Hilary hires a new assistant in Mariah Copeland (Camryn Grimes) and they clash over how to handle the revelation that Mariah's mother Sharon (Sharon Case) has secretly been raising her ex-husband Nick's (Joshua Morrow) presumed dead son. When Hilary edits an interview with Sharon's husband Dylan McAvoy (Steve Burton) to smear Sharon and get back at Mariah, Devon fires her and convinces Mariah to fill in. Despite Mariah suffering a humiliating fall on air, Devon refuses to rehire Hilary and she contacts a talent agent to trick Devon into believing that she can land a new gig. The couple reconcile just as they move into their new penthouse and Devon agrees to rehire Hilary as host and executive producer of the GC Buzz. After Devon forgives Hilary for lying about the job offers, they agree to wipe the slate clean. On New Year's Eve, Hilary is devastated when Devon leaves after it is revealed that she sabotaged Mariah. Devon gets into a car accident and Hilary is relieved when he doesn't remember the fight and the doctor instructs his family not to upset him while he is recovering. However, Devon remembers after Mariah fills him in and files for divorce. A remorseful Hilary agrees not to contest the divorce and is prepared to leave everything behind when Devon asks her to stay with GC Buzz and co-host with Mariah. Though he can't forgive her, Devon stalls the divorce and even causes a scene when Hilary goes on a date with Jordan Wilde (Darnell Kirkwood). Hilary gives Devon an ultimatum, and they sign divorce papers and Hilary finally accepts a divorce settlement — complete with ownership of GC Buzz and the stipulation that she can't fire anyone for a year. Hilary knows Devon attempts to protect Mariah, whom he is now dating.

== Development ==
=== Casting and creation ===
Character concept

When I was hired to play Hilary Curtis she was a devious vision with a dark and lonely past. Her father was imprisoned her whole life and her mother had passed away. She blamed Neil Winters for her death and was on a vendetta to make him pay for it.

— Mishael Morgan, The Huffington Post

Mishael Morgan's casting was exclusively reported by Soap Opera Digest on May 17, 2013. The actress had previously appeared in the 2012 film Total Recall and recently guest starred in an episode of The CW series, Supernatural. Upon her debut, the actress was listed as a recurring cast member. After several episodes on recurring, Morgan was first credited as a series regular on July 8, 2013. Soon after Morgan's debut, the network replaced the writing team which leads to speculation that several new characters, including Hilary would be departing from the series, but Shelly Altman revealed that Hilary would remain on canvas. Morgan got hired on the spot when she sent in an audition tape which was quite rare. "The executive producer couldn't remember someone getting on a show through just forwarding a tape," she said. The Canadian actress later revealed that she was immediately offered a contract with the series so that she could obtain a work permit.

Morgan revealed that when she booked the gig, the producers did not have any solid plans for the character set in stone. The writers told her, "Yeah, you know we have a couple of directions we want to go in but we’re not sure." The series planned to wait for the fan response before they chose a direction for the character. Morgan, who grew up watching the soap with her mother was relieved that she got to build her character from scratch. "This is a brand new character which is good for me because I didn't have to figure out how to play her any differently than someone else had" Morgan stated. She continued "I [modeled] her after me when I was in university."

=== Characterization ===
During an interview with The Huffington Post, Mishael Morgan said "When I was hired to play Hilary Curtis she was a devious vision with a dark and lonely past." According to Morgan, Hilary has "an A-type of personality." The actress described Hilary as someone who is "very insecure"." Hilary "does not know what she wants and rubs people the wrong way." Morgan described Hilary as having "a troublemaker". Hilary often takes the path of least resistance whether she causes trouble or not. When Hilary is first introduced, "She felt the need to be vindicated." Hilary views the world as an "evil place where everybody is out to get her." Shelly Altman insisted that Hilary "was never a psychopath." Instead, "Hilary is a woman in pain because she lost the most important relationship in her life."

=== Introduction (2013) ===
Hilary is introduced as the new assistant to Cane Ashby (Daniel Goddard), then the CEO of Chancellor Industries. Though Hilary flies under the radar upon her introduction, Hilary comes to town looking for "vengeance." Hilary's schemes put further strain on Cane and Lily's marriage as her arrival comes at a time when the couple is already on shaky ground.

In October 2013, then-head writer Shelly Altman revealed plans to expand the character and have her branch out on canvas. But first, Hilary must make peace with "the truth of what happened with her mother" before she can "see things differently." Hilary struggles to accept that her mother was responsible for her death and she needs someone to blame. The realization is what allows the writers to move Hilary beyond her dangerous schemes. According to Mishael Morgan, Hilary is in the process of "identifying who she is" when she finds a friend in Jack Abbott. Hilary is quite surprised by Jack's kindness because it is the last thing she expects. Thanks to Jack, Hilary comes to understand that she has to "make amends." Though Neil forgives her, it is Jack's "support" that is a "real turning point" for Hilary. Morgan insisted that Hilary was sincere in her change of heart.

=== Relationships ===
Morgan on Hilary's attraction to Devon

[Hilary] seemed to care what Devon thought from the very beginning, without really knowing him too well. And I played that kind of genuinely and I think that they kind of picked up on that and started playing with that a little bit.

— Mishael Morgan, TVSource Magazine

Morgan revealed in an interview that Hilary's romantic future was uncertain when she made her debut However, Hilary's most significant romance proved to be her forbidden relationship with then stepson Devon Hamilton, portrayed by Bryton James. Morgan revealed that she suggested the pairing because she always felt a connection between the characters. According to Morgan, Hilary brings nothing but trouble to Devon's life. Devon can see beyond Hilary's "vindictive nature" and offers that "unspoken acceptance" that she craves. Devon and Hilary face several small obstacles early on including their mutual denial, Hilary's kiss with Jack and Devon's brief romance with gold digging supermodel Esmeralda (Briana Nicole Henry). The two also face major obstacles one of which is Hilary avoiding Devon due to his recent billion-dollar inheritance. While Devon's money "adds to the attraction," the reformed Hilary is focused on "doing the right things" and Hilary's interest in Devon would appear suspicious. Later, Hilary's brief romance and sudden marriage to Neil presents yet another major obstacle. Head writer Shelly Altman described Neil as the duo's most "surprising obstacle." In addition, Lily's refusal to accept Hilary at all made for "a great big mess, with much story opportunity" according to Jean Passanante. Hilary marries Devon in August 2015 with their wedding airing throughout 4 episodes.

Due to the initial lack of direction, Hilary has various romantic entanglements before Devon. It initially appears that Hilary is pursuing a romance with her then-boss Cane Ashby (Daniel Goddard). In August 2013, it is revealed that Hilary's interest in Cane is purely about revenge. Hilary had been sleeping with her accomplice in her vendetta Mason Wilder (Lamon Archey). Morgan assumed Mason might become one of Hilary's love interests in an impending triangle but the character was written out after his part in Hilary's schemes are exposed. In early 2014, the writers hint at a potential romance with Hilary's new boss, Peter Bergman's Jack Abbott. Despite an impulsive kiss on Valentine's Day, Morgan said Hilary's "insulted" by the idea that she is after Jack because she has ulterior motives. Though she is "relieved" he doesn't make a huge deal of the incident, Hilary realizes that "Jack's unwillingness to discuss the kiss" is his attempt to avoid embarrassing her further or ruin their professional relationship. In April 2014 when Neil's latest romance falls apart, Hilary comforts him. According to Morgan, Hilary is attracted to Neil because he keeps her grounded when she is struggling to turn her life around. However, Morgan described the relationship as "creepy" due to Neil's brief fling with Hilary's late mother. Meeting Neil who is willing to forgive her and help her out changes Hilary's views on the world and people in general. Jean Passanante insinuated that Hilary's feelings for Neil stem from growing up without a father. On her relationships with Neil and Jack, Morgan agreed that the allure is "more about daddy issues than romance." Morgan said Hilary "wants reassurance from older men." However, Hilary often overcompensates with these men which and that leads to trouble. Feeling obligated to honor her commitment to Neil, Hilary marries him June 2014. However, the marriage crumbles due to her feelings for Devon.

=== Departure (2018) ===
In June 2018, TVSource Magazine reported to rumblings that negotiations between Morgan and the serial were falling through and that she might potentially be departing the role. Hours later, Daytime Confidential announced Morgan's departure from the serial. She last appeared in the role on July 27, 2018 when the character was killed off.

=== Ghostly appearances (2019) ===
Morgan made an unannounced return during the May 1, 2019, episode. She continued to make several recurring appearances for several additional episodes.

== Reception ==
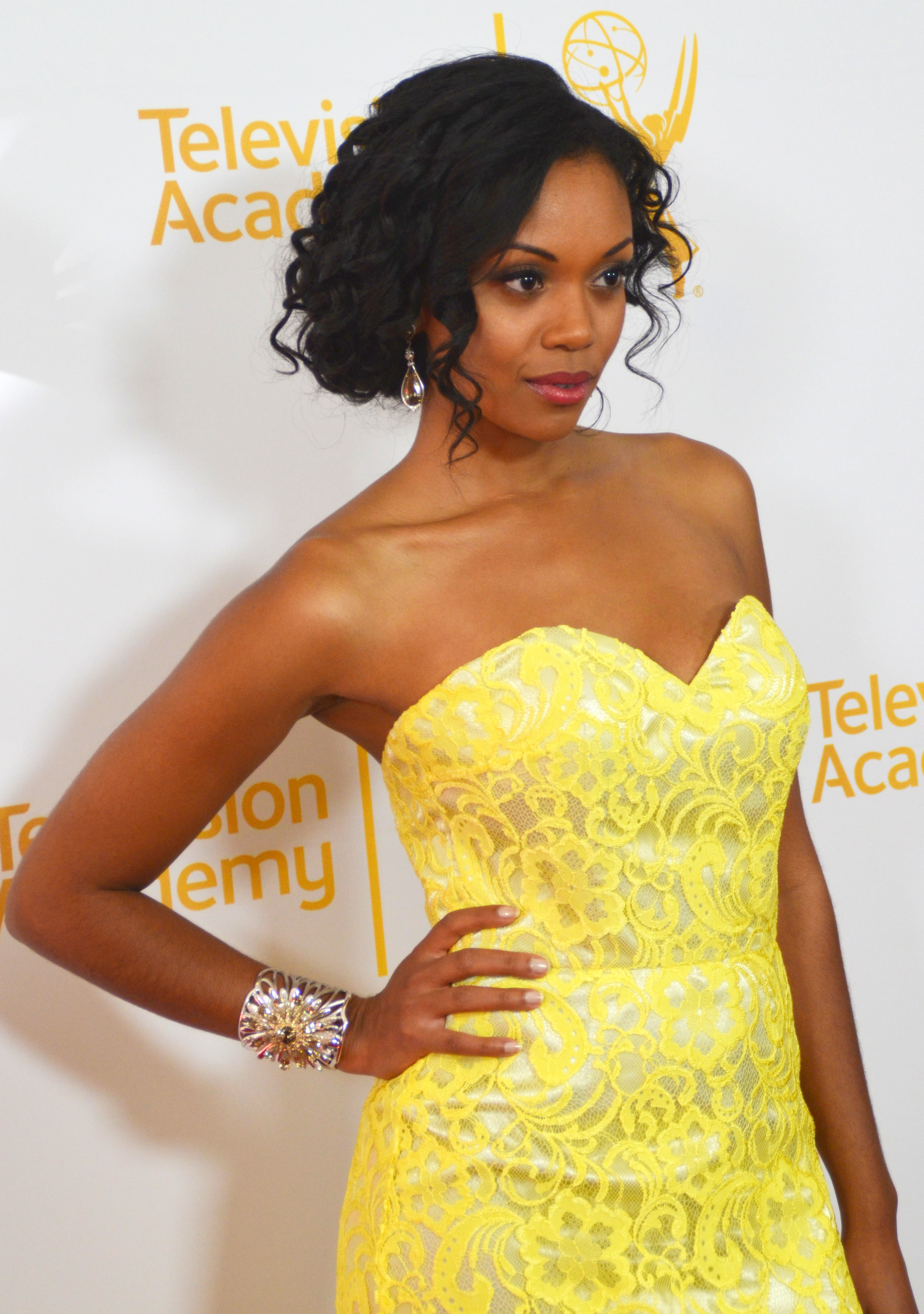
Mishael Morgan's portrayal of Hilary has received praise from critics despite questionable writing at times.

Performer of the Week

Hilary's no saint, but Morgan's genuine portrayal of her love for her husband keeps her a far cry from a one-note sinner.

— Stephanie Sloane, Soap Opera Digest

The character's introduction storyline was critically panned and poorly received by viewers as well. However, the actress was praised for her portrayal and has since been regarded as a fan favorite on the soap opera. Soaps In Depth said "Mishael Morgan steals every scene that she's in." Michael Fairman of On-Air On-Soaps named Hilary the "worst new character" of 2013, but praised Morgan's portrayal as well. He wrote: "This whole storyline from the blogger to Rose, to Hilary’s revenge with the help of Mason (Lamon Archey), which gave the story to the Winters clan, was just not needed, and this character isn’t either, even though Mishael Morgan plays her to the hilt!" While Daytime Confidential also panned the blogger storyline, they praised Morgan for her "sex-sational" performance. They wrote: "Someone give that girl a Kim Zimmer Award. She turned sh** to sugar in 2013." Morgan also ranked at #7 on their list of the "10 Best Soap Opera Newbies" for the year 2013. They wrote: "Much like a boring lump of coal can sometimes turn into a sparkling diamond, The Young and the Restless found quite the gem in Mishael Morgan (Hilary), via the soap's snorefest blogger storyline. Sexy, manipulative, and on the make, Hilary descended on Genoa City like a one-woman plague of locusts in 2013. That isn't quite accurate, since she had help in the form of previously-wasted hottie Mason (Lamon Archey). When was the last time daytime had a pair of mocha schemers this delicious? We can't remember either." Soap Opera Digest described the storyline as the "Most Boring Story" for the entire year. However, the reveal of Mason as Hilary's secret accomplice proved to a highlight for viewers and critics alike. Of the revelation, Soaps In Depth said it was "The twist you didn't see coming!" Lamon Archey said the revelation garnered quite the reaction from fans on Twitter. Soap Opera Digest named Morgan the "Performer of the Week" for her portrayal of Hilary in the aftermath of Devon's car accident in early 2017. Stephanie Sloane wrote, "Mishel Morgan has Hilary's bitchiness down to a science, but when Devon was nearly killed in a car wreck after they'd had a doozy of a fight, she was equally as precise in showing the character's vulnerability."

Barely a year into her tenure, Morgan's Hilary was paired with her then-stepson Devon Hamilton in a forbidden romance that was soon called a super couple. Critics took notice of the pairing's chemistry in their very first scenes together, long before a romantic relationship was even a possibility. Hilary's relationship with Devon garnered quite a vocal fan base very quickly with the duo debuting on fan polls in both magazines and online. Devon and Hilary would make several year end "best-of" lists in 2014 including Daytime Confidential, TVSource Magazine and the duo was listed as the "Best Couple" of 2014 by Nelson Branco of TV Guide (Canada). The TV Watercooler hailed the pairing as "the show's best new pairing in years." Devon and Hilary won the Fan Favorite Award for "Most Romantic Duo" at the 42nd Daytime Emmy Awards in 2015.
