= Devon Hamilton =

Fictional character

- The Young and the Restless character
- Portrayed by: Bryton James
- Duration: 2004–present
- First appearance: June 1, 2004
- Created by: John F. Smith, Kay Alden and Trent Jones
- Introduced by: William J. Bell and John F. Smith (2004); Michele Val Jean and Robert Guza Jr. (2025) (Note: In addition to Michele Val Jean and Robert Guza Jr., other executive producers for Beyond the Gates include Sheila Ducksworth, Kimberly Doebereiner, Anna Saalfeld, Julie Hanan Carruthers, Leon W. Russell, and Derrick Johnson.); Michele Val Jean and Tracey Thomson (2026) (Note: In addition to Michele Val Jean and Tracey Thomson, other executive producers for Beyond the Gates include Sheila Ducksworth, Lela Coffey, Anna Saalfeld, Julie Hanan Carruthers, Leon W. Russell, and Derrick Johnson.)
- Crossover appearances: Beyond the Gates
In-universe information
- Other names: Devon Winters
- Occupation: Music executive; Record producer; Hotelier; Media proprietor; Businessman; Philanthropist
- Family: Chancellor; Winters; Barber
- Parents: Tucker McCall; Yolanda Hamilton
- Adoptive parents: Neil Winters; Drucilla Winters
- Siblings: Lily Winters (adoptive); Ana Hamilton; Moses Winters (adoptive)
- Spouse: Hilary Curtis (2015–2018) (Note: Devon and Hilary Curtis were first married from 2015 to 2017; they remarried in 2018 prior to Hilary's death.); Abby Newman (2024–present)
- Children: Dominic Abbott Newman Winters Chancellor
- Grandparents: Arthur Hendricks; Katherine Chancellor; Ellis Winters (adoptive); Lucinda Winters (adoptive); Walter Barber (adoptive); Lillie Belle Barber (adoptive)
- Aunts and uncles: Brock Reynolds; Malcolm Winters (adoptive); Olivia Winters (adoptive); Tyra Hamilton (adoptive)
- Nieces and nephews: Charlie Ashby (adoptive); Mattie Ashby (adoptive)
- First cousins: Mackenzie Browning; Nate Hastings (adoptive)

Devon Hamilton (also Winters) is a fictional character from The Young and the Restless, an American soap opera, portrayed by Bryton James. The character made his first appearance on June 1, 2004. He was introduced as a homeless teenager who is taken in by the Winters family, the core African-American family within the series. Drucilla Winters (Victoria Rowell) sympathizes with Devon because she too was a product of the foster care system. Drucilla and her husband Neil (Kristoff St. John) raise Devon along with their daughter Lily (Christel Khalil) and legally adopt him in 2006.

Unlike most young male characters whose stories typically centered around romance and teen angst, the character of Devon became a vehicle for social and human interest stories, focusing on the challenges of having a drug addict for a parent, being a product of the foster care system, and deafness. While Devon has a consistent love interest, the romance was rarely displayed and severely undeveloped. In 2009, the character was involved in a controversial storyline in which he had an affair with Tyra Hamilton (Eva Marcille), a woman he'd come to know as his aunt, though it was later revealed they are not related. The foster care, meningitis and deaf story arcs received critical acclaim for their social impact and earned James five Daytime Emmy Award nominations for Outstanding Younger Actor in a Drama Series and James won the award in 2007. James also earned seven NAACP Image Award nominations for Outstanding Actor in a Daytime Drama Series and he won the award in 2009.

In 2011, the character would be written into more traditional soap opera plots starting with the revelation that he is the long lost grandson of the wealthy Katherine Chancellor (Jeanne Cooper). However, the plot twist would only bring him closer to his adoptive father, Neil. In 2013, Devon inherits the bulk of Katherine's billion dollar estate which turns his life upside. In 2014, Devon enters into an affair with Neil's young wife Hilary Curtis (Mishael Morgan). Devon's forbidden love affair with Hilary would mark the character's first major love story and would also solidify the character as a viable romantic lead. Due to the chemistry between the characters, the pairing of Devon and Hilary quickly amassed a very active fan base and as well as critical acclaim which propelled them to supercouple status. James earned six Daytime Emmy Award nominations for Outstanding Supporting Actor in a Drama Series; he won the award in 2020. In 2025, the character made a crossover appearance on Beyond the Gates, the first in the serial's production; he made subsequent appearances in 2026.

== Storylines ==
The character is introduced in 2004 as a delinquent living out of group homes. The homeless teenager is fostered and eventually adopted by Drucilla Winters (Victoria Rowell) and her husband, Neil (Kristoff St. John). In 2006, Devon contracts meningitis and completely loses his hearing and he receives a cochlear implant to restore his hearing. Later Devon is implicated in the murder of Carmen Mesta (Marisa Ramirez). Fortunately his name is cleared when Jana Hawkes (Emily O'Brien) admits to the murder. In December 2006, Devon is officially adopted by Neil and Dru but his happiness is short-lived when Dru is presumed dead in April 2007. Later that year, Devon starts dating Lily's friend, Roxanne (Tatyana Ali). In 2008, Devon meets his "aunt" Tyra (Eva Marcille) for the first time and he learns that Tyra's adopted daughter, Ana (Jamia Simone Nash) is actually his biological half-sister, also abandoned by Yolanda.

In 2009, Neil and his new wife Karen Taylor (Nia Peeples) make plans to adopt Ana but those chances are destroyed when Neil cheats with Tyra—and Devon witnesses the affair. In May 2009, Devon meets his great-aunt Virginia (Della Reese) who reveals that Tyra is adopted and Devon disapproves when she starts dating Neil. However, Devon realizes his disdain for Tyra stems from the fact that he is attracted to her and after she splits with Neil, they end up sleeping together after he berates her for breaking up Neil's marriage. Roxanne finds them together and immediately dumps him while Tyra skips town with Ana. Devon and Roxy reconcile in October 2009.

After he graduates college in 2010, Devon takes a job as a photographer's assistant to support his music career. He lands a gig at Tucker McCall's label Resurrection Music producing with Noah Newman (Luke Kleintank). However, when Noah abandons him for another gig, Devon convinces Tucker to give him another chance which culminates with Tucker firing him. Fortunately, Tucker's estranged mother Katherine Chancellor (Jeanne Cooper) launches her own label and hires Devon to run it. When Katherine falls into a coma, it is revealed that Tucker is Devon's biological father. Devon rejects Tucker and Katherine as Yolanda (Debbi Morgan), now called Harmony, returns looking to make amends and explain her actions. Ana convinces Devon to forgive Yolanda, and try and connect with his new family. In 2012, Tucker and Harmony convince Devon to get another surgery to improve his hearing. Devon befriends Abby Newman (Marcy Rylan) who invests in his label as he produces for Angelina Veneziano (Diana DeGarmo). Devon offers her a record contract, but Angelina instead goes to California and Devon closes down his label and joins the marketing team at Jabot Cosmetics. In 2013, Tucker offers Devon a position at his record label but Devon turns it down because it would keep him away from his family and Roxy is furious that Devon considered taking the position without consulting her. Katherine passes away and Devon is shocked when he inherits the bulk of her billion dollar estate. Devon offers a million-dollar reward for Cordelia Abbott's killer and even funds a charity in her name. However, Devon's paranoia about his new found wealth leads to Roxy leaving him. Devon befriends Mason Wilder (Lamon Archey) and the reformed bad girl Hilary Curtis (Mishael Morgan) who tips him off about Mason stealing his identity after Devon gets arrested for destroying a hotel room in Las Vegas. Devon also defends Hilary against Lily's attacks.

In 2014, Devon buys the Genoa City Athletic Club, hires Lily and her husband Cane Ashby (Daniel Goddard) to run it. After Hilary rejects him, Devon has several flings, including the gold digger model Esmeralda (Briana Nicole Henry). Despite that, Devon is still attracted to Hilary and is furious to learn she is sleeping with Neil. Devon professes his love for Hilary and kisses Hilary the night before she marries Neil. Hilary rejects him, Devon reluctantly stands in as Neil's best man at the wedding. Devon drowns his sorrows in alcohol, getting Hilary's attention, and she urges him to forget about her. Devon admits his love for her and after several close moments, Devon decides to leave town. Though she doesn't want to hurt Neil, Hilary admits her feelings for Devon and they grow closer after they are stranded on the side of the road over night. Devon later agrees to a date with Abby (Melissa Ordway) hoping to get Cane and Lily off his back just as Hilary is ready to make a decision about their future. Hilary finally professes her love for Devon and they agree to tell Neil the truth just as Neil lands in the hospital after being electrocuted and left blind. Because Hilary refuses to leave Neil until he recovers, Devon and Hilary give in to temptation and begin an affair. They are later discovered by Cane who orders them to end it immediately. However, they continue seeing each other in secret only to be caught by Cane's father Colin Atkinson (Tristan Rogers) who blackmails Devon into paying him off in exchange for his silence. Colin later demands more money so he can help Jill acquire Chancellor Industries from Victor Newman. Cane neutralizes Colin and Devon gives the money directly to Jill and makes her promise to cut Colin out of the company.

Devon wants to wait for Neil to adjust to the news that his condition isn't treatable, only for Neil to confront them when they are on a plane trip to Chicago looking for office space for Chancellor. The plane later crashes leaving the group stranded in a blizzard and they are eventually rescued. Devon is devastated when Hilary announces that she faked her love for Devon to avenge her mother's death. In March 2015, during a drunken binge, Neil causes a car accident that leads to district attorney Christine Blair (Lauralee Bell) and police chief Paul Williams (Doug Davidson) losing their unborn child and to keep Neil out of prison, Devon immediately contacts Leslie to represent him. Devon is shocked when Hilary blackmails ADA Winston Mobley (Ryan Caltagirone) into giving Neil a suspended sentence. Hilary finally comes clean about her schemes and tells Devon she is still in love with him and she only left him so he could salvage a relationship with Neil. Devon and Hilary reunite and announce their engagement shortly after Hilary and Neil's divorce is finalized. Devon and Hilary support Lily when her marriage falls apart after her own affair Joe Clark (Scott Elrod) and she assist them with wedding planning.

At his bachelor party, Devon presumably gets drunk and cheats on Hilary with a prostitute. While he doesn't remember anything, Lily warns a distraught Devon to keep quiet unless he is sure. Neil finally gives his blessing on Devon and Hilary's wedding day they on their honeymoon soon after. When Hilary goes missing, Devon is the prime suspect and he returns to Genoa City to avoid being arrested. Devon is about to be extradited back to Virgin Gorda until Nikki Newman (Melody Thomas Scott) pulls strings to stop the transfer. As Devon awaits news after offering a reward, he tracks down the pilot that transported Hilary from the island who reveals she is in Genoa City. Devon receives a ransom note and someone steals the reward and Cane is implicated. Hilary resurfaces suffering from amnesia and believing she is married to Neil and rejecting Devon. Devon is furious when Neil confesses to rescuing Hilary after accidentally causing her accident; Neil has hired Dr. Simon Neville (Michael E. Knight) to help bring her out of the coma. Devon is about to turn Neil in until Hilary talks him out of it. Devon's hopes for reconciliation are dashed when Hilary regains her memories but not her feelings for Devon. Devon rescues Neil from Neville's blackmail attempt by investing in Neville's medical research and Devon puts Neil in charge. Ashley Abbott (Eileen Davidson) comes aboard and allows the research project to set up shop in Jabot Cosmetics lab. Hilary also becomes the spokes model for the project to help protect Devon's investment.

In January 2016, Neil tries to orchestrate Devon and Hilary's reunion and Devon is furious to find the duo sleeping together. Devon then serves Hilary with divorce papers and after Neil rejects her, Hilary suddenly changes her mind about loving Devon but he is hesitant to believe her. A drunken Neil causes trouble at a press conference forcing Devon to fire allowing Hilary to take over. Devon is suspicious when Ashley suddenly gives up her position at the research company to Hilary. When Jack and Neil form the Abbott-Winters Foundation to support recovery centers across the country, Hilary convinces Devon to donate $1 million to challenge Ashley. Hilary also fights for a seat on the board of the foundation and Devon convinces Neil not to hire her fearing the trouble she could cause. A furious Hilary announces plans to divorce Devon and take half his fortune but when Hilary ends up in the hospital again, he rushes to her side as Neville administers treatment. Though Neville believes his medicine is working, Hilary collapses in Devon's arms—she is dying. Devon fires Neville and hires another doctor to save his wife. When the victims of the failed drug protocol announce plans to sue, Hilary convinces Devon to settle with them to avoid escalated scandal. Devon, Hilary, Lily and Cane later support Neil when he reconnects with his estranged mother who dies shortly after their reunion.

In September 2016, Devon attempts to bribe the GC Buzz to kill a story about Jack Abbott (Peter Bergman) allegedly abusing his wife Phyllis (Gina Tognoni) and it backfires when the tabloid runs a story about Devon bribing the press. To stop the stories' circulation, Devon buys the production company and plans to shut down production until Hilary convinces him to keep it on the air and just change the way they tell stories. Devon goes a step further and decides to make Hilary the lead anchor. However, Hilary becomes obsessed with keeping viewers happy and spiking ratings which clashes with Devon's wishes of telling stories without destroying lives. Devon enlist Hilary's new assistant Mariah Copeland (Camryn Grimes) to help keep Hilary on the straight and narrow. Hilary and Mariah clash over how to handle the revelation that her mother Sharon Newman (Sharon Case) has secretly been raising her ex-husband Nick's (Joshua Morrow) presumed dead son. When Hilary edits an interview with Sharon's husband Dylan McAvoy (Steve Burton) to smear Sharon to get back at Mariah, a furious Devon fires her. Despite a humiliating fall on air, Devon convinces Mariah to serve as a temporary replacement until he can find a permanent host as Hilary refuses to return to the job. Meanwhile, Devon and Hilary reconcile and they move into a new penthouse.

After Lily exposes that Hilary tricked Devon into rehiring her, the couples decides to start over and keep honesty first. During a charity gala, Mariah reveals that Hilary sabotaged her on-air and Devon leaves her and gets into a car accident. While Devon survives, he has short term due to a concussion. Despite filing for divorce, Devon convinces Hilary to co-host GC Buzz with Mariah. He later convinces Hilary to co-host GC Buzz with Mariah. Devon and Hilary divorce in April 2017 though he is obviously jealous of her budding romance with Jordan Wilde (Darnell Kirkwood). Hilary gains ownership of GC Buzz in the divorce with stipulation that she can't fire anyone for a year, to protect Mariah, whom Devon is now dating. Devon launches the Hamilton-Winters Group with Neil and they acquire Mergeron Enterprises from Dina Mergeron (Marla Adams). Devon signs Tessa Porter (Cait Fairbanks) to his new record label. Meanwhile, Devon's romance with Mariah is plagued by his struggle to move on from Hilary and they ultimately break up in November 2017.

In 2018, Devon cuts Tessa from the label when she steals lyrics from Mariah. Later, Devon buys GC Buzz from Hilary as she needs cash to ensure financial security as she plans for a baby. Devon exposes that Hilary knew Cane had been falsely accused of sexual harassment and soon starts dating his new artist Simone (Shanica Knowles). Devon is about to fire Hilary for missing a GC Buzz taping until he learns she is mentoring the 17-year-old Shauna (Camryn Hamm). Devon agrees to be Hilary's sperm donor and draws up a co-parenting contract. Despite their plans to keep the relationship platonic, Devon and Hilary sleep together and he calls off the arrangement as it complicates his budding romance with Simone. Neil urges Devon to honor his commitment to Hilary, and he breaks up with Simone, he and Hilary go forward with the insemination. While they play matchmaker for Shauna and Devon's nephew Charlie (Noah Alexander Gerry), Devon and Hilary bond over their future and rekindle their romance. Devon invites the pregnant Hilary and Shauna to move in with him. Despite the efforts of Devon's cousin Nate Hastings (Brooks Darnell), Devon is devastated when Hilary dies from injuries sustained in a car accident. He lashes out when he discovers Lily caused the accident after she ran a red light during an argument with Hilary. While Neil blocks Devon's attempts to punish Lily, she turns herself into the police and Devon urges the judge to impose the maximum sentence. Devon has a last minute change of heart and Lily is sentenced to 1 year in prison. Devon forgives Lily after the sentencing and also pays for Shauna's college education in Hilary's name. Devon's mood swings and wild parties lead to Neil luring Ana (Loren Lott) to town to keep an eye on him. Devon is furious when Cane arranges for Shauna to move to Colorado with her family because she doesn't feel comfortable living with Devon anymore. Devon experiences panic attacks and starts taking anxiety medication when he attends therapy. As Devon's new assistant, Ana convinces Devon to sign Fenmore Baldwin (Zach Tinker) to a record contract. In December 2018, Devon partners with Abby Newman when she wants to launch a new restaurant with Lola Rosales (Sasha Calle) as the chef.

== Development ==
=== Creation and casting ===
The character of Devon was created by the writers as a vehicle to explore the foster care system. Actress Victoria Rowell who portrayed Devon's adoptive mother Drucilla, had pitched the storyline to co-head writer John F. Smith. Rowell, a product of the foster care system herself, pitched the storyline multiple times before it was approved. In an interview with Daytime Confidential in 2008, Rowell revealed that she was adamant that the actor portraying the role of the foster child be a Black actor due to the population of kids in the system being predominantly African-American boys.

Bryton James (previously credited as Bryton McClure) was cast in the role of Devon in April 2004. James was previously known for his portrayal of Richie Crawford on the ABC sitcom Family Matters. As he finished high school in 2004, James took up acting again and one of his first auditions was for The Young and the Restless. James reminisced about the audition process in a 2014 interview with Soap Opera Digest. "I remember very vividly walking through the big door on the third floor for the read. The scenes for my audition were heavy drama so I had a sense of what I would be in for." While the scenes had nothing to do with the character of Devon, James made quite the impression on casting director Marnie Saitta. "She stopped me halfway through my reading and said, ‘Finally! Someone reading the character the way it’s supposed to be read!’" A few days later, James was invited to do a screen test opposite Christel Khalil with four new scenes. James and Khalil had previously worked together when she guest starred on Family Matters. James credited Khalil with helping him land the gig. "Christel put in a good word for me and the rest is history" he said. In a 2019 interview, James revealed that he didn't know anything about the role or the character when he first auditioned. Once he got hired, "I remember sitting down and having some deep conversations with Victoria Rowell." James made his debut on the June 1, 2004 episode.

n July 2025, it was announced that James would crossover as Devon into Beyond the Gates. He made his appearance during the episode that aired on August 11. On January 27, 2026, it was revealed that James would crossover once more, along with several of his cast members. This event aired from June 9 to June 12 of the same year. James again appeared during the November 4, 2026, episode.

=== Characterization ===
==== Personality ====
In 2014, James said Devon is "so complex." Upon his introduction, Devon is a "homeless foster kid with trust issues." In a 2004 with Soap Opera Weekly, James described the character of Devon as a "very guarded kid." According to James, Devon likes to stand on his own. He is not the kind of person that likes to be "babied" the actor said to Soap Opera Digest in 2006. He has a tendency to lash out if feels like he is being coddled. In 2011, head writer Scott Hamner described Devon as being "very independent and confident in his ability to take care of himself and shape his own destiny." In 2013, James described Devon as being "very down to earth." According to James, Devon had to become accustomed to dealing with huge life changes. In 2018, James described Devon as "always" having a "quick-temper" but said that over time, he has evolved the character be more "easygoing" like himself. In 2019, James said of the character's development throughout the years, "I think the writers have done a really great job at making the character accurate to how he would be, how he would feel, how he would treat others."

==== Backstory ====
Devon is born on February 7, 1988, to Yolanda Hamilton. Devon grows up believing his father abandoned them though he apparently lives in Genoa City. Devon even runs into the man he believes is his father outside of a pool hall once but doesn't interact with him. Yolanda, who struggled with an addiction to crack, disappears often leaving Devon in her mother's care. His grandmother proves to be the most stable force in his life. Every year, Devon would spend his birthday with her at the zoo and every Christmas, they'd make 7 layer bars together. After his grandmother's death, Devon is placed in foster care as Yolanda is unable to care for him. Devon goes from one foster home to the next, and has been in approximately a 12 different foster homes. Each time, Devon went in hoping his new foster parents would keep him longer than a few weeks, but his hopes were always crushed. One set of foster parents in particular, the Taylors, Devon believed wanted to keep him. However, he ended up back in the system when their marriage fell apart. In the beginning, Yolanda would visit him until she just stopped. By the time of his introduction, Devon hadn't seen or heard from Yolanda in years. Devon has also been arrested for small crimes such as shop lifting and breaking curfew. He even spent three days in juvenile detention for stealing a sandwich. After all of his bad luck in foster homes, Devon is placed in New Promises Group in Genoa City in the summer of 2003. While in foster care, Devon is forced to attend therapy and at one point, even takes antidepressants.

=== Foster care and hearing impairment ===
Soap Opera Digest said Devon's introduction as a homeless foster child taken in by Neil and Drucilla landed the character on the "front burner in a social-issue saga." With Victoria Rowell as a story consultant, the foster care storyline was only expected to run through the summer of 2004. However, Devon was soon integrated into the canvas. Rowell helped craft the story by "framing it" with the necessary characters from Devon's social worker, Lorena Davis (Davenia McFadden) to Devon's birth mother Yolanda (Chene Lawson). Rowell herself is a product of the foster care system having spent the first 18 years of her life growing up in the system. The actress had been heavily involved in working with foster children over the years after she found success which inspired her to incorporate it into the series. Rowell taught James all she could about the foster care system and James would use the lessons to inform his portrayal of Devon whose life was drastically different from his own. According to James, Devon's earliest plots "were all directly from experiences that Victoria herself had." Most famously, when Devon runs off to the zoo after the Winters forget his birthday was a mirror image of one of Rowell's many experiences in foster care. James and his co-stars filmed opposite a real life lion for the scenes in which Devon gets trapped at the zoo. Rowell "gave me great insight into Devon and what he was feeling" James recalled. When James realized just how important the plot was to Rowell and the producers at the time, he assumed it would last for quite a while. "But never in a million years did I expect it would be this integrated into the canvas of such an iconic show." Of Devon's eventual adoption in December 2006, James said "It showed commitment. It showed someone following through with their word. Devon had encountered families that ‘talked the talk,’ but didn't ‘walk the walk.’ He dealt with a lot of emotional insecurity. To have the Winters family commit to him meant a great deal. It showed that they were in for the long haul with him even though he'd put them through a lot."

Bryton Brings it on!

Devon struggles a lot more with then he lets on. He believes that things are going to get better but at the same time, he doesn't want to be treated different. He doesn't want to feel like a handicapped person.

— Bryton James, theyoungandtherestless.com

Bryton James (above) as Devon wearing his cochlear implant in 2012.

From 2006 to 2007, James who had been asking for the writers to challenge him with a great storyline got the chance to show off his acting chops when his character contracts meningitis and the disease nearly kills him. When Devon starts college, he refuses the recommended immunization shots for the infection. However, the most significant part of the storyline is Devon losing his hearing. Though Devon definitely needs help, he wants to keep everyone at arms length because he wants to deal with the situation on his own. He puts on that tough "exterior." Devon who already has to make his own way in the world due to his chaotic childhood, is forced to re-learn to communicate with his family and friends while starting college. After learning from doctors that surgery is his only option, Devon gets the Cochlear Implant surgery on November 26, 2006. At the time of Devon's meningitis scare, Neil and Dru are on the verge of divorce and it is his illness that brings the Winters family back together. Devon's illness helps them to realize that there a lot more important things to deal with then their "trivial problems." James did a lot of online research to prepare for the storyline about the different levels of severity in meningitis cases, to how much hearing one could lose, to how much of their hearing a person could get back. James also reached out to some of his own real life friends who are deaf to get a feel for what Devon would feel. James compared it to Devon's foster care storyline: "[Y]ou can't completely understand unless you have been through it. Losing any of your senses is difficult. You can act it all you want but to do the best job, it is something you need to explore with someone who really has been through it." James admitted that he was worried about the storyline not knowing if he could completely grasp the situation because he had not experienced it. James had to "wing it." However, Devon is not completely hopeless; he believes anything is possible because he's already survived so much. Devon does not just accept that he will always be deaf. However, James said it was difficult to ignore his co-stars in scenes as if he could not hear them. Bryton and his co-stars immediately had to learn sign language from an onset coach. Fortunately, Devon can still speak, so James does not have to use sign language that often. The Young and the Restless worked in conjunction with Advanced Bionics for the storyline.

The storyline was revisited in early 2012 when the character's hearing is fully restored due to another surgery. James revealed that Devon's most recent surgery to restore his hearing was actually inspired by real life advances in cochlear implants. His co-star, Eileen Davidson, whom at the time played his stepmother, Ashley Abbott, brought the information to James's attention, who presented the information to Maria Arena Bell. The advances were eventually incorporated into the show. Of the decision to incorporate the real life medical advancements into the story James said, "For it come to fruition and for me to play someone going through is very humbling." The story culminates on April 11, 2012, with Devon getting his new implants activated restoring his hearing completely. Of the story, James said that Devon's hearing loss was "something you can't really understand unless you experience it, so you just try to the best you can." The actor praised the writers for giving him the opportunity to play the story. James appreciated that his early storylines could not be categorized as the "traditional" soap opera plots, but instead the stories were very socially relevant.

=== Early romances (2007–2009) ===
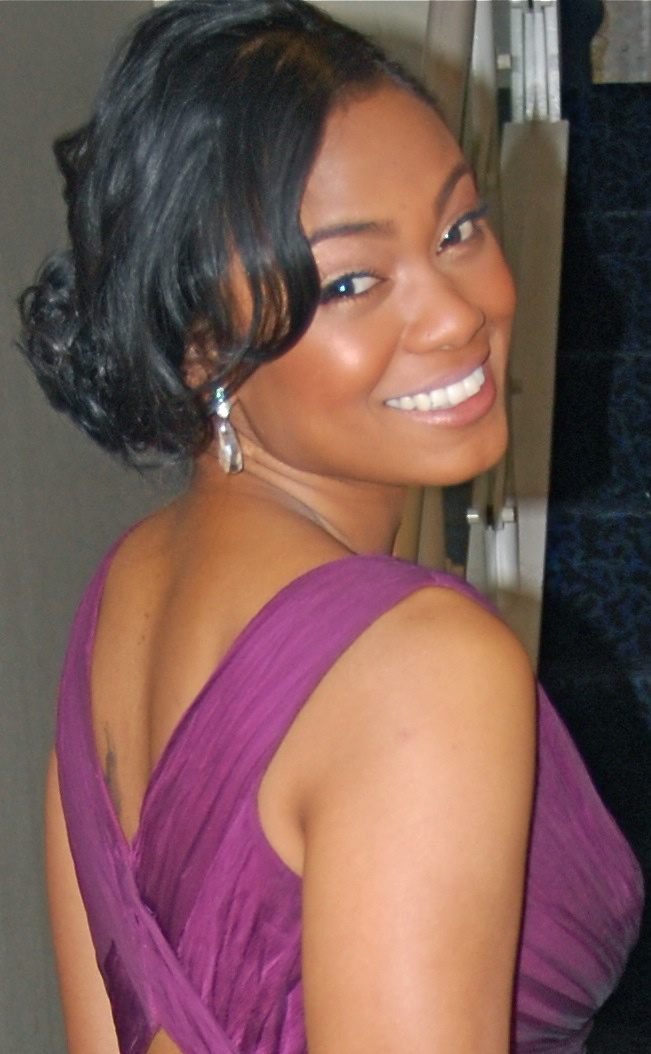
Tatyana Ali appears as Devon's girlfriend "Roxanne" from 2007 to 2013.

Prior to Hilary, Devon had seen very little romantic development. However, James appreciated that his character was not immediately thrust into a romance but was instead "given extremely meaningful and big stories over the first nine years." The actor believed it gave the audience time to see Devon grow into a "believable" leading man. While the character has brief dalliances here and there, he has a stable girlfriend in Roxanne (Tatyana Ali) starting in 2007. However, the pairing receives very little development. The character's most controversial story to date involved Devon's affair with his "aunt" Tyra (Eva Marcille). In May 2009 the writers introduced Devon's great-aunt, Virginia (Della Reese) who reveals several family secrets, including that Tyra is not biologically or legally related to the Hamiltons. In June 2009, Daytime Confidential published a spoiler article which revealed that Devon would begin to develop romantic feelings for Tyra and Devon even fantasizes about kissing her. At the time, Devon is upset with Tyra for breaking up Neil's marriage to Karen Taylor (Nia Peeples). During an argument on August 12, 2009, an angry Devon brings Tyra to tears and when he comforts her, they end up sleeping together; the two are caught by Roxanne. Bryton defended Devon by reminding fans that Devon was only 19 years old when he slept with Tyra and until the affair Hilary, Tyra is the only big mistake Devon had made in his romantic life. Devon has grown up a bit since his tryst with Tyra. Also, the lack of a family connection between Devon and Tyra made it seem a little less dramatic for James. They "didn't grow up together. It's not like someone you see at every family reunion or anything like that." Ultimately, James regretted the storyline because it made Devon look like a hypocrite when he comes down on his biological parents for having an affair when Tucker is still married.

=== Paternal lineage (2009–2013) ===
While his mother's history was well documented, the topic of Devon's paternity was rather unclear. The seeds for the story were first planted in 2009. James expressed to executive producer and head writer Maria Arena Bell his hopes for Devon's paternity to be explored at some point. "I always liked the idea of Devon finding his father and hoped it would be someone already in Genoa City." In May 2009, Devon's great-aunt Virginia (Della Reese) presents him with a letter that reveals that Devon's father never knew about his existence. It changes everything for Devon who grew up believing his father was a junkie like his mother or just some guy who chose not to be in his life. According to James, the revelation "leaves it wide open to the possibilities of what kind of man this could have been." To further complicate matters, it is not clear what state Yolanda was in at the time of his conception. This turn of events also made James hopeful that the writers would soon explore his character's paternity. James initially envisioned the character of Michael Baldwin (Christian LeBlanc) as Devon's father.

Top of the World

While James clearly had fleshed out his fantasy, nothing could have prepared him for the reality of being informed that Devon's father is actually Tucker, making him the grandson of Genoa City's matriarch, Katherine.

— Julie McElwain, CBS Soaps in Depth (2011)

In May 2011, Daytime Confidential reported that Devon would soon come into contact with his biological father. In July 2011, it was announced that All My Children superstar Debbi Morgan had been cast in an undisclosed role. Yahoo! TV suggested several scenarios for her potential character including a recast of Devon's mother Yolanda, or the mother of Tucker McCall's (Stephen Nichols) long lost son. Upon Morgan's debut, it was revealed that the two potential roles were one and the same – Devon was Tucker's son.

After he married in March 2011, James planned to take time off for his honeymoon when the producers informed of plans to feature Devon in a major storyline. "It was a bad and very good thing" James remarked. The actor admitted that he was not really in favor of introducing a new character as Devon's father. While Tucker was still a relatively new character, the plot twist made Devon the grandson of Katherine Chancellor (Jeanne Cooper), the show's matriarch. Of the storyline, James said "… it was more than I could ever have dreamed for myself. I never in a million years thought [Devon] would end up tied to the very core of the show. You can't get more entrenched than that!" According to Maria Arena Bell, she'd been looking to revisit the story since James first mentioned it in 2009.

According to co-head writer Scott Hamner, the manner in which Devon finds out about his paternity "leaves a very bad feeling for Devon" and makes him "bitter." Devon had such high hopes and learning that Katherine not only found out about his paternity, but chose to keep it from him, and give him a job instead leaves Devon angry. Devon also feels slighted that it took two billionaires like Katherine and Tucker so long to find him despite their wealth and power as he realizes they could have saved him from the struggles he faced early in life. However, the revelation only strengthens Devon's bond with his adoptive family. "Devon always will be Neil's son" James insisted. According to the actor, it is Devon's connection to the Winters family that keeps grounded when he suddenly comes into wealth. While most people would allow money to change them, James believed that nothing could ever make Devon turn away from Neil.

As a unit, the Winters family were given several stories over the years, but not many of which allowed the family to intermingle with the non-African American characters often. Devon's connection to Katherine further removes the family from the proverbial "Black Box" in which the characters only interact with other African American characters. The storyline makes Devon the first biracial character to be introduced in the series and also reflected Bryton's own heritage.

Upon Jeanne Cooper's passing in May 2013 and the subsequent announcement that Katherine's death would soon be acknowledged onscreen, many wondered who would benefit from Katherine's vast empire. Deanna Barnert concluded that Devon would be the biggest winner considering he would be Katherine's only blood relative still on the canvas at the time of Katherine's death. Because Devon's connection to Katherine was still fairly new compared to her other more well established relatives, many wondered exactly how much Devon would benefit compared to Katherine's other and more well established relatives. In an interview with Soaps in Depth's Julie McElwain, James hinted that there was quite a bit of story coming for Devon while McEwin questioned if someone could come after Devon's new inheritance. Devon has no problems using his new wealth to shower his loved ones with expensive gifts, but he is caught off guard when his longtime girlfriend Roxanne (Tatyana Ali) suddenly puts a down payment on a new place for them. The money brings a new dynamic to the relationship and Devon starts questioning Roxy's motives. According to James, Devon feels very guilty for accusing Roxy and though he doesn't really believe she is with him for the money, he would have rather they made a decision like that together. While James insisted that Devon's new wealth would not change him, Devon struggles to keep up with the sudden changes, from billionaire Victor Newman (Eric Braeden) suddenly taking an interest in him to Roxy's decision to move in together, and Mason Wilder's (Lamon Archey) schemes to suck up to Devon. It would be even harder for Devon to find his "passion" because the money brings him so many more opportunities leaving him a bit overwhelmed. In the fall of 2016, newly installed head writer Sally Sussman Morina revealed that she felt that Devon's inheritance "left him without drive, without a goal." She continued, "What does he want? What does he strive for? I don't think those questions were ever asked, so we need to fix that." Over the years, Devon has proven to be quite generous with his fortune. According to James, "it's understandable because he never came from it." Devon's idea of "money and giving back and sharing wealth and helping to uplift others, it comes from what he never had and what he always wished people did for him."

=== Relationship with Hilary Curtis (2013–2018) ===
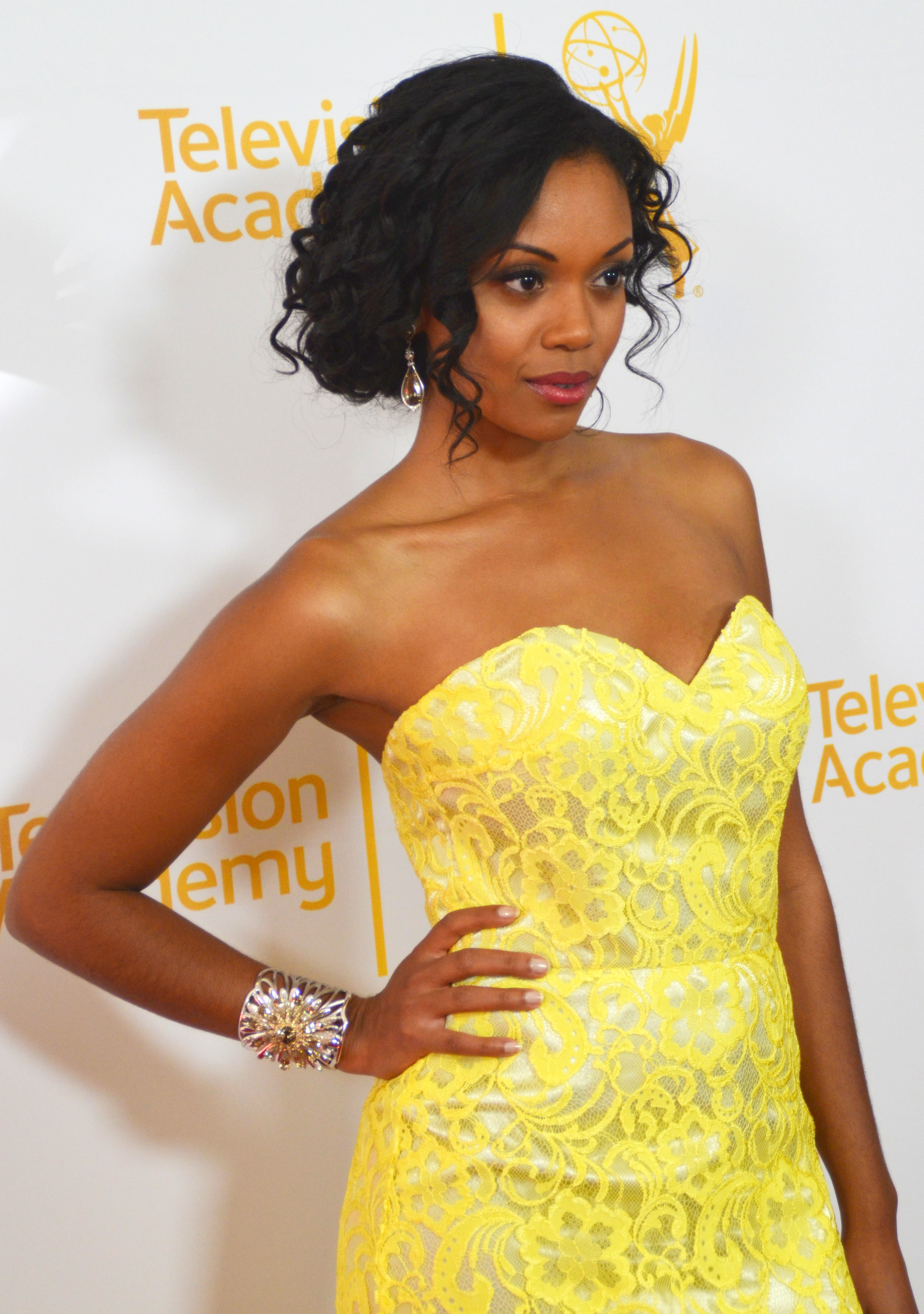
Devon and Hilary's (Mishael Morgan) "forbidden love" garnered fan support very early on, and even more so after Hilary marries Neil (Kristoff St. John).

Devon's most significant and popular pairing proved to be his romantic pairing with Hilary Curtis (Mishael Morgan). The couple faces several obstacles before they even become a couple including Hilary's "denial" of her feelings and Hilary's misunderstood attraction to her boss Jack Abbott (Peter Bergman) which sends Devon into the arms of the gold digging supermodel Esmeralda (Briana Nicole Henry). Jean Passanante said "Esmeralda is unabashedly attracted to Devon's money, perhaps as much as she is to Devon himself." Devon thinks he has missed his chance with Hilary after seeing her with Jack. Writer Shelly Altman insisted that the duo shared a mutual attraction but they would need to overcome yet another and "very surprising obstacle!" That obstacle comes in the form of Hilary's short lived romance and sudden marriage to Neil. James viewed the situation differently then he did Devon's affair with Tyra because at the time, he was very young, still only a teenager when it occurred. In the triangle with Neil and Hilary, Devon is an adult and he can come at Neil as an equal. Despite unflattering circumstances, the pairing was a hit with most fans and critics which James accredited to the writers for "taking the time, and letting the fans get invested in really caring about Devon and Hilary's feelings for each other." According to James, Devon believes he has found "true love" with Hilary. Devon and Hilary face a long uphill battle once their affair is exposed. James was "thrilled" to finally get the opportunity to play a more "traditional soap" story like Devon and Hilary's affair. Devon and Hilary married in August 2015 with their wedding airing over the course of 4 episodes. Devon and Hilary's marriage is plagued by many ups and downs and the couple ultimately divorces in 2017. During his separation from Hilary, Devon quickly rushes into a romance with his friend Mariah Copeland (Camryn Grimes), and Hilary's co-worker. "I think Devon's friendship with Mariah happened at the right time, and they do have feelings for each other," James said. However, the relationship is plagued by Mariah's growing attraction to a woman, which Devon isn't aware of, and Devon's unwillingness to profess his love for Mariah when pressures him to do so. According to James, Devon and Mariah are "testing each other's feelings, trying to figure out what's going on." The relationship happens so fast after Devon's split from Hilary, "that it's hard not to think a rebound-esque thing is going on" James insisted. After failed romances with other people, Devon and Hilary reunite in 2018 in a unique way – by agreeing to conceive a child together, strictly as platonic co-parents. However, they soon rekindle their romance and prepare for their child. After failed contract negotiations in the summer of 2018, Mishael Morgan vacates the role of Hilary and executive producer Mal Young chose to kill off Hilary and their unborn child. The actors weren't aware of the plans until they received the scripts. James revealed "One day everything's fine. The next day she's in the hospital with days to live." In preparation of Morgan's final scenes, Young sent James clips of Devon and Hilary's journey together which the actor said "Just watching them made me emotional all over again." James admitted that he would miss working with Morgan. "Mishael was always ready to commit 110 percent to the material that was on the page, which is an acting partner's dream." While he enjoyed playing it, James thought it was one of the more unbelievable plots Devon was involved in.

=== Grief (2018–2019) ===
While he would miss Devon and Hilary's relationship, Bryton looked forward to whatever the producers had in store for Devon next. After the sudden deaths of Hilary and his unborn child, "Devon is in a state of shock from experiencing so much pain in such a short amount of time." Meanwhile, Neil worries Devon will shut his family out when he needs them the most like Neil did when he lost Dru. According to Julie McElwain, Devon struggles with "anger issues" over Lily involvement in Hilary's death. Though he understands the animosity Lily has for Hilary, Devon believes that "Hilary has done so much to make up for what she did and everyone has given her another chance except Lily. Even when Lily has said she would try, in the next breath, she said something insulting and degrading toward Hilary." But for Devon, finding out Lily is responsible for Hilary's death is the "last straw" for him. He wants to punish her. When Cane begs Devon not to press charges, Devon remembers that Cane was at Lily's side whenever she set out to cause trouble for Hilary. And while most of his anger is reserved for Lily, Devon harbors "resentment" for Cane trying to cover up Lily's involvement. Though Neil promises he won't let it get that far, Devon is angry enough to go against Neil. He isn't surprised that Neil is protecting Lily, but he also knows if it was anyone else, Neil would support "Devon's need for justice." Though they are the only consistent family he's ever had, it's very "difficult" for Devon to see beyond his grief. Devon throws himself into work, and his coldness toward Lily forces Neil to interfere. But the last thing Devon wants is advice about how he should be handling his grief. "I think Devon is at his tipping point!" James declared. James vowed that whatever happened "would changed the dynamic of the [Winters] family for the rest of their lives!" What Lily did can't be undone, "So there are certain [familial] feelings that also won't be coming back!" The pressure from his family to forgive Lily only leaves Devon further "frustrated." Devon feels he needs to see Lily punished to grieve. As Lily's trial approaches, Devon starts realizes just how much is ridding on what he says to the judge. "Lily and Cane have children who will suffer greatly if their mother goes away for a long time, so Devon's not blind to all of that." While getting "justice" for the family he lost is his "top priority" Devon knows he can't be too "one-sided." Facing his family in court "makes it very real" for Devon. Though Devon isn't moved by Cane's testimony, Shauna asking the judge not to punish Lily has a drastic effect on him. "She's a young girl who doesn't want to have a hand in somebody's life being ruined because of an accident." Ultimately, Devon decides against burying Lily in court and she is sentenced to prison for a year. However, James said "It doesn't look like Devon is going to get over Hilary's death anytime soon." Devon "needs to grieve" the actor continued. In November 2018, Loren Lott steps into the role Ana whom Neil lures to town due to Devon's battles with depression because of his grief.

With the sudden passing Kristoff St. John in February 2019, the writers decide to kill off the Neil character. By the spring of 2019, Devon seems to be moving forward, both professionally and personally as he had started dating Elena Dawson (Brytni Sarpy). He even shares a happy reunion with Lily when she attends the grand opening of his new restaurant. "Seeing Lily makes the night even better for him. Despite what they went through to have her end up in prison, forgiveness has been made and the relationship is mended." Unfortunately, Devon's hopes for a new beginning are crushed when he finds Neil has passed away. Devon returns to the restaurant "visibly shaken" where he is forced to break the news to his family at the worst possible moment. Devon experiences "great difficulty coping with Neil's death so soon after losing Hilary and their unborn child." For Bryton James, it was harder for him to film Neil's funeral than it was to attend Kristoff St. John's real life funeral, the week before. Seeing the set decorated with flowers and Kristoff's portrait made it "more real for me." James reasoned that it was "because it's at the studio where I met him, worked with him, lived with him and had so many special moments with him." Having so many cast members return to honor Kristoff and Neil added to those feelings for James. Despite the large number of people working that day, the filming "went smoothly." James continued, "Kristoff would've been proud and I was grateful to be part of it." When Devon sees Neil at home, the writers gave James the opportunity to personalize some of his dialogue. James revealed that his own father's passing in 2016 helped him with the story as well.

On May 1, 2019, Mishael Morgan makes an unannounced return as Devon mistakes Hilary for Elena after a dream which leads to them kissing. CBS Soaps in Depth confirmed that Morgan would appear in several more episodes. According to the magazine, Hilary would help Devon move past his grief. However, Hilary's looming presence is proof of how hard it is for Devon to move on without Hilary. "Having this new romance and love just kind of came out of nowhere. You want to move on. And Devon is still very young. So it's natural to have these new feelings. But it's also normal to have a difficult time with letting go of someone that you were that attached to." James appreciated that the writers paced it out instead of having "Devon get over [his grief] too quickly." Morgan hinted that it wouldn't be the last time Devon would be visited by Hilary.

== Reception ==
=== Awards and nominations ===
Bryton James has received critical acclaim for his portrayal of Devon throughout the years. Bryton was nominated for the Daytime Emmy in the Outstanding Younger Actor in a Drama Series category 5 times from 2006 to 2009, and once again in 2013. He won the award in 2007. For his 2009 Emmy nomination, James submitted the scenes of Devon's reaction to losing his little sister, Ana to the foster care system, after interference from his biological mother. Bryton's portrayal of Devon has also garnered him several NAACP Image Award nominations for Outstanding Actor in a Daytime Drama Series, from 2005 to 2009. James won the award in 2009. James was nominated for the Daytime Emmy Award for Outstanding Supporting Actor in a Drama Series six times: in 2016, 2019, 2021, 2022, and 2024; he won the award in 2020.

=== Foster care ===
Deanna Barnert of Soap Opera Weekly said "The foster care community has taken note" of the storyline and fans immediately took a liking to James. Soap Opera Digest praised the storyline as the "Best Social Issue" arc for the year 2004. The magazine said, "A social-issue soap story needn't be controversial or shocking to be effective, as Y&R proved with an intelligent and realistic tale about foster care. Not an inherently 'sexy' topic, the story was nonetheless compelling" specifically due to Victoria Rowell, who played Devon's foster mother Drucilla was so heavily involved in the story. "The result was an involving storyline" that received several accolades. "By allowing for vastly different viewpoints, it wasn't preachy or emotionally manipulative" and like all great soap stories, it added layers to an existing relationship.

=== Hearing loss ===
Sign (Language) of the Times

Bryton's accurate depiction of a cochlear implant (C.I.) recipient has been so well-acted that we continue to receive many comments from actual C.I. recipients inquiring if the actor is a real C.I. patient!

— Deanna Barnert, Soap Opera Digest (2007)

He won his first and only Emmy Award in 2007 for his portrayal of Devon during the hearing loss storyline. Despite some thinking the characters picked up sign language too quickly, Bionic Ear experts praised the storyline and James for his portrayal. The storyline also led to increased interests in cochlear implants and provided hope for those dealing with hearing loss. James expressed gratitude to viewers thanking him for his portrayal of Devon's situation. James earned his fifth Emmy nomination in the Outstanding Young Actor category in 2013, for his portrayal of Devon during the scenes where Devon's hearing is completely restored after a new cochlear implant.

=== Paternity and inheritance ===
The storyline about Devon's paternity received both positive and mixed criticism. Jae Jones from Yahoo! TV praised the series for reflecting "current times" by making Devon the biracial grandson of one of the show's core characters. Yahoo! TV also hailed the plot as the best reveal of 2011. Wordwiley complimented the series for making an established character like Devon Tucker's son instead of introducing a new character. The author also commented that the dynamic between Katherine, Tucker, Devon and Harmony was rich with potential story. Carolyn Hinsey said Nichols's Tucker was not a strong enough character to hang such a heavy story one. Naomi Rabinowitz appreciated that the plot cemented both Tucker and Devon to the canvas, and that it made for an interesting dynamic pitting Neil vs. Tucker, but disapproved of the constant rewriting of Katherine's history. Luke Kerr said that while he wasn't a big fan of the initial story, he enjoyed seeing Devon and Tucker bond over their shared interest in music. Sara Bibel praised the story arc because it allowed James to showcase his talent, and it provided the very underused character with a storyline, and described the plot twist as a "juicy way of defining" the character. However, Bibel admitted that the execution could have been better. During the week of Devon's paternity reveal, the show gained 282, 000 total viewers rebounding from a previous week of a new ratings low.

In response to Devon's inheritance, Sara Bibel described the plot twist as a "doozy." Bibel praised the twist for "transforming" Devon without having to make him act "out of character." Boone of Soapcentral said "I'm kind of curious to know what Devon's role will be in the future." However, the column also said that Devon has never been a leading character. Others were completely dumbfounded by the twist and said it didn't make any sense. Sara Bibel appreciated that the storyline was the most upbeat of the storylines on the series, but disapproved of Devon's need to maintain his normal way of life; "God forbid we should get to see someone having fun even though aspirational, wish-fulfillment storylines are a daytime staple," Bibel said. Bibel later criticized how instead of having some fun, pursuing his own dreams, or a new business venture, Devon reacts to his inheritance "by feeling guilty about unearned wealth despite being surrounded by people with trust funds." CBS Soaps in Depth also criticized the writing for Devon's reaction due to the money bringing him more misery than happiness. ABC Soaps in Depth said of Devon becoming the go-to-guy for money, "Why are the numerous rich folks of Genoa City treating The Young and the Restless' Devon like their own personal piggybank?"

=== Romances ===
After nine years with the series, James' character entered into a forbidden relationship with his then stepmother Hilary Curtis that was soon called a supercouple. Critics took notice of the pairing's chemistry in their very first scenes together, long before a romantic relationship was even a possibility. Devon's relationship with Hilary garnered quite a vocal fan base very quickly with the duo debuting on fan polls in both magazines and online. Devon and Hilary would make several year end "best-of" lists in 2014 including Daytime Confidential, TVSource Magazine and the duo was listed as the "Best Couple" of 2014 by Nelson Branco of TV Guide (Canada). The TV Watercooler hailed the pairing as "the show's best new pairing in years." One writer known as Gingersnap appreciated the decision to pair the African American Devon with the African American Hilary and likened them to the Black version of William Shakespeare's Romeo and Juliet. Ashley Dionne from TVSource Magazine said Devon and Hilary gave fans "the audacity to hope" while simultaneously proving Bryton James' status as a "romantic daytime hunk." Devon and Hilary won the Fan Favorite Award for "Most Romantic Duo" at the 42nd Daytime Emmy Awards in 2015.

Despite the critical acclaim and fan response, fans of the pairing controversially accused the writers of racism, while others accused the producers of underestimating James' appeal as a romantic lead by suddenly pushing Devon aside and rushing Hilary into a romance with Neil and then forcing a triangle. Then executive producer Charles Pratt Jr. sparked further controversy when he attributed the couple's lack of airtime to budgetary restraints and Mishael Morgan's real-life pregnancy.

Devon's previous romances were rather poorly received. Critics and fans were very much against Devon's affair with Tyra a full two months prior to the story playing out onscreen. The storyline was compared to fellow CBS soap, Guiding Light's incest storyline in which first cousins, Tammy Winslow (Stephanie Gatschet) and Jonathan Randall (Tom Pelphrey) fall in love and marry. Tammy is killed off just days after their wedding. TV Guide listed Devon and Tyra's one-night-stand as the "WORST AFFAIR" of 2009. Naomi Rabinowitz of Soap Opera Digest also disapproved of the storyline and described the dynamic between Tyra and Devon as "creepy " due to their lives being so intertwined and Devon being raised to believe Tyra is his aunt. On the other hand, while Lauren Flynn agreed that the plot was a turn off to viewers due to their relation, Flynn argued that the tryst was a "welcome twist" to an otherwise lackluster storyline. However, Flynn liked that the storyline gave Devon something to do instead of serving as a talk to for Lily. Jamey Giddens who immediately disapproved of the storyline agreed to wait until after the storyline played out and said the plot was "ridiculous," due to their attraction coming out of nowhere. However, a poll posted on Daytime Confidential saw 60% of voters being against the storyline as well. Fans tend to hold Devon's affair with Tyra against the character because of how judgmental he is. Soaps in Depth also praised the decision to put an end to Devon and Roxy's romance, and accused prior regimes of treating James and Ali as glorified day players.

Charlie Mason and Richard Simms from Soaps She Knows named Devon's affair with Abby Newman (Melissa Ordway) as the "Most Shocking Hookup" of soap operas of 2022, commenting that their "jaws definitely dropped when Young & Restless' Devon and Abby suddenly started going at it on the couch… and the stairs… and against the wall…".
