= Neil Winters =

Fictional character from the American CBS soap opera The Young and the Restless

- The Young and the Restless character
- Portrayed by: Kristoff St. John
- Duration: 1991–2019
- First appearance: February 14, 1991
- Last appearance: February 6, 2019
- Introduced by: William J. Bell
In-universe information
- Other names: Neil Ellis Winters
- Occupation: Businessman, Nightclub owner
- Family: Winters
- Father: Ellis Winters
- Mother: Lucinda Winters
- Half-brothers: Malcolm Winters
- Wife: Drucilla Barber (1993–98, 2003–07); Karen Taylor (2008–09); Sofia Dupre (2011–12); Hilary Curtis (2014–15)
- Sons: Moses Winters
- Daughters: Lily Winters (legal)
- Adoptive sons: Devon Hamilton
- Grandsons: Charlie Ashby (legal); Dominic Phillip Newman Abbott Winters Chancellor (adoptive)
- Granddaughters: Mattie Ashby (legal)
- Nephews: Holden Novak; Nate Hastings (adoptive)

Neil Winters is a fictional character from The Young and the Restless, an American soap opera on the CBS network. Created and introduced by William J. Bell, the role was portrayed by Kristoff St. John from 1991 until St. John's death in 2019. As of 2019, Neil is the longest-running African American character to appear on the series. St. John last appeared as Neil on February 6, 2019.

Over the years, Neil's storylines have involved his marriages to Drucilla Winters (Victoria Rowell), as well as his volatile relationship with his half-brother Malcolm Winters (Shemar Moore). Neil's daughter, Lily Winters (Christel Khalil), was involved in a paternity storyline, with Neil and Malcolm as her potential fathers. In 1994, Bill Bell had Malcolm walk into Drucilla's bedroom after she had taken prescription drugs. Fully understanding the drugs she had taken caused her to believe him to be her husband, Malcolm chose to take advantage of the situation leaving Dru pregnant. While both her and Malcolm were unsure of the baby's paternity, Neil believed he was the father. Bell chose not to follow up on this plot point, leaving it unresolved until 2005 when then-Executive Producer, John F. Smith, revealed Malcolm as the father. Neil and Drucilla have shared two marriages and adopted a son, Devon Hamilton (Bryton James). Since Drucilla's presumed death in 2007, Neil has had numerous other romances, including Karen Taylor (Nia Peeples), Sofia Dupre (Julia Pace Mitchell), Leslie Michaelson (Angell Conwell), and Hilary Curtis (Mishael Morgan). St. John's portrayal of Neil has garnered a positive response over the years, awarding him two Daytime Emmy Awards and eight NAACP Image Awards.

== Character development ==
Lilana Novakovich of the Toronto Star characterized Neil as an "over-achiever". The Philadelphia Inquirer wrote that Neil was "a young and restless makeup company executive". In 1994, St. John described Neil as "the typical overachiever", stating he's "energetic and striving for the top spot at Jabot Cosmetics. He doesn't really see himself as a ladies' man but rather quite sensual; he's very secure." Neil is known for his pairing with Drucilla Winters (Victoria Rowell). Their romance began in 1991; St. John stated at the time that he wanted the series to "take its time as romance blossoms" between Neil and Drucilla. Following St John's death, Neil was killed off in April 2019.

== Storylines ==
In 1991, rising Jabot Cosmetics executive trainee Neil Winters becomes involved in a love quadrangle with Drucilla Barber (Victoria Rowell), Olivia Barber (Tonya Lee Williams), and Nathan Hastings (Nathan Purdee). Olivia and Nathan are engaged but Olivia's sister Dru wants Nathan for herself. She has Neil attempt to woo Olivia away from Nathan. While doing so, he falls in love with Olivia. Neil and Dru's attempt to break up the couple is unsuccessful. Neil and Dru fall for one another and become romantically involved. They are married in a private ceremony at Katherine Chancellor (Jeanne Cooper)'s estate in March 1993.

Neil's half-brother Malcolm Winters (Shemar Moore) comes to town in 1994. There is animosity between Malcolm and Neil (now an executive at Newman Enterprises), but Malcolm befriends Dru and soon falls in love with her. While she is over-medicated on cold medicine, they have sex and Dru becomes pregnant. She does not know if Neil or Malcolm is the father. They decide to keep their affair a secret and to allow Neil to raise the baby whether he is the father or not.

Neil and Dru's daughter, Lily Winters, is born in 1995. Dru's career as a fashion model caused problems in her marriage to Neil. He wanted her to be a stay at home mom. These problems eventually led to a divorce. Dru and Lily leave Genoa City and Neil for Paris. After Victoria Newman (Heather Tom) becomes pregnant with the baby of Cole Howard, her former husband, she and Neil bond and decide to raise the child together. They plan to marry. Victoria goes into an early labor and gives birth to a premature baby, Eve, who dies shortly after birth. After this they decide to end their engagement. Subsequently, Neil has a relationship with Dru's sister Olivia, and comes very close to having an affair with Malcolm's fiancée Alex Perez (Alexia Robinson).

After the murder of his best friend, Ryan McNeil (Scott Reeves), and the apparent death of his brother, Malcolm, Neil also battles alcoholism. Neil eventually manages to get his illness under control, but almost loses his family and career.

In 2002, Drucilla and Lily (Christel Khalil), now age 14, return to Genoa City. Dru hopes Neil can help rein in their rebellious daughter. They end up reuniting romantically and remarry in 2004. They become entangled in business issues as he works for Newman Enterprises and she works for Newman's rival, Jabot Cosmetics. They also have to deal with their daughter's troubles as Lily becomes involved with Internet predator and hebophile Kevin Fisher (Greg Rikaart), who infects her with chlamydia, a sexually transmitted disease.

Neil and Dru meet juvenile delinquent Devon Hamilton (Bryton James) in 2004. Although Neil is initially reluctant, they take him in and become his foster parents. Soon after Devon turns 18, they adopt him.

Malcolm returns to town in 2004. He demands a paternity test from Dru, to prove once and for all if he or Neil is Lily’s father. When the test proves that Malcolm is Lily’s biological father, they agree to keep it a secret and Malcolm leaves town.

In 2006, Neil and Dru's marriage becomes strained when he finds out Malcolm is Lily's biological father. He separates from Dru and develops romantic feelings for Carmen Mesta (Marisa Ramirez). They fight their feelings and Dru becomes increasingly jealous of their relationship. She breaks into Carmen's hotel room and cuts up her clothes. Carmen has her arrested and presses charges. Neil tries to get her to drop them. When she refuses Neil completely stands behind Dru. It is revealed that Carmen had an affair at her previous job with married executive David Chow (Vincent Irizarry). She sued the man's company for sexual harassment after she was fired by the man's wife. Carmen is eventually killed outside of Neil's new jazz club, Indigo. Devon is wrongfully arrested for her murder, but he is soon exonerated.

In April 2007, Dru and her best friend Sharon Newman (Sharon Case) attend a cliff-side photo shoot for NVP. After an argument with Phyllis Summers, who also attended, Dru and Sharon fall backwards off the cliff. A nearly dead Sharon is later rescued; however, search and rescue personnel only find the remains of Dru's jacket. Her body is never recovered. Neil briefly turns to alcohol once again, but stops when he sees the effect it is having on Lily.

Later that year, Neil begins a romantic relationship with Karen Taylor (Nia Peeples). They move in together. Devon is united with his aunt Tyra Hamilton (Eva Marcille) and half-sister Ana Hamilton (Jamia Simone Nash). Tyra develops romantic feelings for Neil but keeps them to herself. Olivia tries to push Tyra and Neil together because Tyra reminds her of her sister Dru. Neil stays with Karen.

Tyra raised Ana because her birth mother, Yolanda Hamilton, could not. Yolanda reports Ana missing and Ana is taken away from Tyra. So Ana will not be taken away and given to strangers, Neil and Karen marry and become her foster parents. Karen convinces Neil to take it a step further by adopting Ana. Tyra soon reveals her feelings to Neil, who eventually reciprocates. The two make love, unaware that their tryst was discovered by Devon. Devon confronts him and Neil is horrified when he sees how much he hurt his son. Neil soon admits his infidelity to Karen, who still wants to proceed with Ana's adoption. However, at the adoption hearing Neil tells the judge that Tyra has been and would be the best parent for Ana. Tyra is awarded full and permanent custody of Ana, and a devastated Karen leaves and divorces Neil.

With Neil's extramarital affair exposed, he pursues a relationship with Tyra. Soon thereafter, it is revealed that Tyra is not biologically related to Devon or any of the Hamiltons, a secret she kept to protect her chances of gaining custody of Ana. Despite his anger and resentment toward Tyra, Devon finds that he is attracted to her. Following a particularly vicious argument, Devon and Tyra have sex with each other, unaware that his girlfriend Roxanne (Tatyana Ali) has walked in and discovered them in the act. The following day, Roxanne angrily breaks up with Devon, who later admits his indiscretion to a stunned Neil. Tyra leaves town with Ana, and Devon eventually reunites with Roxanne.

In April 2009 Neil resigns from Newman Enterprises, recognizing that he would never rise any higher in the family-owned business. The following day, he accepts the position of chief executive officer of Chancellor Industries, the conglomerate owned by Katherine Chancellor (Jeanne Cooper). In December, the company is acquired in a hostile takeover by Tucker McCall, who is revealed to be Katherine's long-lost son. Chancellor Industries becomes a subsidiary of Tucker McCall Unlimited. Consequently, Neil begins to work closely with Tucker and with McCall Unlimited's chief financial officer, Sofia Dupre (Julia Pace Mitchell). He is stunned to discover that Sofia is engaged to his brother Malcolm (now Darius McCrary), who has recently returned to Genoa City.

In 2010 Neil and Ashley Abbott (Eileen Davidson) begin dating, after many years of friendship. The couple parts on friendly terms after Neil decides to focus on his children and new grandchildren and readjust his life.

In February 2011, Neil's son-in-law Cane Ashby (Daniel Goddard) is murdered. The entire Barber/Winters family comes together to support Lily and her twin babies with Cane, Charlie and Matilda. At the time, Sofia is estranged from Malcolm. Impressed with how Sofia has taken great pains to support Lily, Neil allows his deep-seated attraction to Sofia to surface, and the two have sex.

In March 2011, Neil testifies in the lawsuit that Victoria, Nicholas and Abby Newman brought against their father and his former boss Victor Newman. Victor's younger son Adam had previously testified that while Victor in Mexico and Adam was in control of Newman Enterprises he forged the Newman trust funds, which was what Victoria, Nick, and Abby based their lawsuit on, thus helping Victor's case. This means that if Adam was the one that committed this crime, that the entire lawsuit could be dismissed. Victor had secretly made Adam testify to this in return for Victor helping Sharon be cleared on criminal charges. Neil testified that it was impossible for Adam to forge the trust funds because Adam did not have access to Victor's private files. Neil's testimony helps win the case for Victoria, Nick, and Abby. The judge order Victor to pay the three each $500 million for a total of $1.5 billion.

Neil then finds himself attracted to Leslie Michaelson, the lawyer who represented the Newman children in the lawsuit. The two get a room at the GCAC, but agreed to nothing sexual. Later Michael Baldwin catches the two flirting at the coffee shop. He said that the judge might think that Neil and Leslie have done business under the table. She cleverly responded that the judge would be more concerned about Adam lying under oath.

Neil asked Leslie to be his date to Malcolm and Sofia's wedding. At the reception at Glow Worm, Sofia had to rush herself to the bathroom because she felt sick. On their honeymoon, she found out that she is pregnant, but is not sure if Neil or Malcolm is the father. Sofia confides in Dr. Olivia Winters about this. Olivia mathematically concluded that Neil must be the father, but Sofia, who is still in love with Malcolm, is holding on to hope that the father is Malcolm until a DNA test can prove the paternity for sure. Sofia later confesses the entire situation. Malcolm is so hurt that he moves into a hotel room after nearly getting into a fight with Neil.

Cane Ashby is revealed to still be alive and that it was his twin Caleb that had died. Cane's father Colin wanted to kidnap the twins and take them to Australia. Colin thought he was being aided by Caleb, but in reality it is Cane that is working against his father. Cane does this by making Lily think that she is slowly losing her mind by appearing as a ghost figment of her imagination. Lily breaks down and commits herself into a mental hospital. Cane was able to stop Colin's plan. He then reveals himself to be alive. Every one is disgusted at Cane for what he did to Lily and let a dangerous man like Colin around the twins knowing Colin would eventually try to kidnap them as soon as he knew he would become a grandfather. Neil is so irate at Cane that he punches Cane and says "that was for Lily". Cane is now working as a bartender at a bar called Jimmy's and Colin. He was arrested but was set free citing diplomatic immunity. In October 2011, Sofia's baby—named Moses after her father—is born, and DNA testing reveals that Neil is the father. Malcolm leaves Genoa City and promptly divorces Sofia, who moves in with Neil when she and Moses are discharged from the hospital. A month later, Neil and Sofia agree to get married—for the baby's sake. Throughout the time of their marriage, Neil continues to flirt with temptation with Harmony Hamilton, which increases Sofia's insecurities about her marriage to Neil. The pair later decide to divorce as the best interest for Moses.

In April 2019, Devon found that Neil had died in his sleep from a stroke.

== Reception ==
Months into St. John's debut, the Calhoun Times wrote: "At Jabot Cosmetics, where he's a junior executive, Neil Winters is just beginning to carve his professional niche." St. John won two Daytime Emmy Awards and eight NAACP Image Awards for his portrayal.

In 2022, Charlie Mason from Soaps She Knows placed Neil 10th on his list of the best 25 characters from The Young and the Restless, commenting that "The late Kristoff St. John's alter ego was sometimes led by his zipper, it's true. But in every other regard, he was our touchstone, our go-to. Neil was slighted time and again at the office — Victor, Victor, Victor! — yet in our minds, he'd long ago been promoted to the post of Character to Whom We Most Related. Now, sadly, he's also among the Characters We Miss the Most."
