= Drucilla Winters =

Fictional character from the American CBS soap opera The Young and the Restless

- The Young and the Restless character
- Victoria Rowell as Drucilla Winters
- Portrayed by: Victoria Rowell (1990–2007); Dawn McMillan (1996); Kent Masters King (2000)
- Duration: 1990–1998; 2000; 2002–2007
- First appearance: May 7, 1990
- Last appearance: April 6, 2007
- Created by: William J. Bell
- Introduced by: Edward J. Scott (1990, 2000); David Shaughnessy (2002)
In-universe information
- Other names: Drucilla Barber
- Occupation: Cosmetics spokeswoman; Executive Director of Cosmetics (Newman Enterprises); Businesswoman; Fashion model; Ballerina; Photographer's assistant
- Family: Barber
- Father: Walter Barber
- Mother: Lillie Belle Barber
- Sisters: Olivia Winters
- Husband: Neil Winters (1993–1998, 2003–2007)
- Daughters: Lily Winters
- Adoptive sons: Devon Hamilton
- Grandsons: Charlie Ashby; Dominic Newman-Abbott-Chancellor (adoptive)
- Granddaughters: Mattie Ashby
- Uncles: Wesley Barber
- Aunts: Mamie Johnson
- Nephews: Nathan Hastings, Jr.
- First cousins: Justin Barber

Drucilla Winters is a fictional character from the American CBS soap opera The Young and the Restless. Created by William J. Bell as an effort to add more African American characters to the cast, the role was portrayed by Victoria Rowell. Rowell left the role in 2000 to pursue other projects and Alexia Robinson was introduced as Alex Perez, a replacement character, shortly after. Rowell later returned in August 2002.

In 2007, Rowell became unhappy with the soap opera behind the scenes, labeling daytime television and The Young and the Restless as racist for not having enough African-American cast and crew. She also argued the directions of her storylines which weren't heard, prompting her to leave. Within the storyline, Drucilla fell off a cliff and was presumed dead as her body was never found. Rowell has openly expressed pleasure and willingness to return, and as a result of the character's strong appeal and popularity, viewers have campaigned for the series to rehire her. However, CBS has stated that having Drucilla return is not the creative decision they are looking for, which has disappointed fans of the actress. In 2015, Rowell filed a lawsuit against the soap opera and Sony Pictures Entertainment for retaliation, claiming that she had been blacklisted by the network for speaking out against what she believed was racial discrimination during her time portraying Drucilla.

The character is a ballerina-turned-model, with a forward personality and feisty persona. Introduced in 1990 as a runaway teen and street urchin whose aunt is Mamie Johnson (Veronica Redd), the housekeeper for the Abbott family. Drucilla's storyline revolves around normal soap style rags to riches story beginning as a rough around the edges illiterate young woman, to becoming a glamorous model and later a major business executive and one of the elite citizens of Genoa City. Most of her history also revolves around a long-term relationship with cosmetics executive later CEO Neil Winters (Kristoff St. John) with Dru and Neil becoming one of the main super couples on the show, being raped by Neil's brother, Malcolm (Shemar Moore), which resulted in the birth of a daughter, Lily (Christel Khalil), and on-again/off-again relationship with her sister, Olivia (Tonya Lee Williams). Drucilla's rivalries with Ashley Abbott (Eileen Davidson) and Phyllis Summers (Michelle Stafford) (the latter often providing the series' comic relief), and friendships with Victor Newman, Jack Abbott, Brad Carlton (Don Diamont) and Sharon Newman (Sharon Case) have also proved popular as plot points.

== Casting ==
Victoria Rowell originated the role on May 7, 1990. Dawn McMillan filled in for Rowell while she was on maternity leave from January 26 to February 9, 1996. Rowell left the show on April 2, 1998. She came back for a recurring gig from February to September 2000. During this time, Kent Masters King assumed the role for several episodes. That same year, Rowell chose to exit the soap opera again in order to star in a Showtime miniseries. She returned to the role in August 2002, after a two-year absence.

Drucilla's exit in 2007 was not without controversy. She was unhappy about her character, and voiced her opinion about it. Ultimately, Rowell opted to be let out of her regular contract. Months after Drucilla's death, Rowell had an interview with Black Press Magazine. She explained her reasonings for leaving: "We have the most popular daytime show and the number one show for African Americans, hands down. Yet, there are no black writers, there are no black producers, there are no black directors. There are no Black make up artists. There are no Black hairstylists." Rowell went on to say that to get any attention or recognition, she had to write her own script for it to be comfortable with her. She had pointed out signs of racism, as she was a top actress for her work on The Young and the Restless yet had failed to secure many Daytime Emmy Nominations, and never won once. Rowell even expressed her displeasure with the situation on social networking site Twitter, too. In an interview with Soap Opera Digest prior to her final airdate, Rowell stated:

I rewrote every single script I got. I've had to and the writers have always been receptive to that. It all started with Bill Bell giving me permission to tweak script after script and I've been able to do that for 14 years.

In the same interview, she had revealed that accomplished and central actors on the soap opera such as Eric Braeden, who portrays Victor Newman, had asked her to stay. Rowell said that she tweaked her script to give Dru a voice, but explained that "everything happens for a reason and where I couldn't exercise that particular artistic expression with Y&R." Since her departure, speculation has arisen multiple times that Rowell would return at some point, but this has never materialized.

In February 2015, Rowell sued The Young and the Restless and Sony Pictures Entertainment for retaliation, alleging that she was blacklisted by the network and production company due to her speaking out against lack of diversity on and behind the cameras at the soap opera. Rowell also alleged in her suit that she faced years of racial discrimination during her time on the series, and was denied writing and directing opportunities which have been granted to Caucasian actors.

== Storylines ==
=== Backstory ===
Drucilla "Dru" Barber runs away from home as a teenager, due to her problematic relationship with her mother, Lillie Belle (Norma Donaldson), and goes to stay with her aunt Mamie Johnson (Veronica Redd) who is a housekeeper for Jabot Cosmetics founder John Abbott, Sr. In doing so, she sacrifices her opportunity for a promising career as a ballerina.

=== 1990–2000 ===
Dru is illiterate, but is taught to read by private detective Nathan Hastings (who was once also illiterate). Nathan later marries and fathers a child by Dru's successful physician sister Olivia. Drucilla and Olivia originally have a relationship fraught with tension and anger, due to mother Lillie Belle's favoritism of Olivia over Drucilla. She admitted many years later that Dru was an unwanted child, the result of husband Walter's drunken lust. It was no wonder that Dru ran away as a teenager and spent years on the streets racking up a criminal record. Olivia was shocked by this revelation, needless to say and saw Dru in a new light for the first time in years. Walter assured Olivia that even though Dru's conception was not planned, he loved her regardless and had no regrets over having her. Olivia was relieved and grateful to hear this, but was furious with Lillie Belle for mistreating Dru all those years, leading the two sisters to reconcile in a very emotional manner and they have had a loving relationship ever since.

Dru eventually marries Neil Winters, but only after many trials and mistakes. One such misstep, is posing nude for a magazine, though Jill Abbott (Jess Walton) discovers and destroys the film. Over time, Dru eventually evolves into a glamorous model. In June 1993, after marrying Neil, Drucilla finally receives closure by telling off her mother for wanting to abort her and not showing love for her as a child. Dru becomes close with Neil's brother Malcolm Winters, who develops a crush on her. While she is under the influence of cold medication, Malcolm rapes her knowing she believed him to be her husband. When she ends up pregnant, they decide not to uncover the child's paternity and keep their affair a secret. Dru gives birth to her daughter, Lily, in 1995. Dru's marriage to Neil ultimately collapses because her desire for a career clashes with his desire for a wife who stayed home. Dru develops very close friendships with people in town, including Brad Carlton (Don Diamont), Sharon Newman (Sharon Case), Victor Newman (Eric Braeden), and Jack and Ashley Abbott (Peter Bergman and Eileen Davidson). She develops an adversarial relationship with Phyllis Romalotti (Michelle Stafford), which only intensifies as the years go on. Dru and Lily move to Europe where Dru continues her modeling career.

=== 2002–07 ===
Dru and Lily return to Genoa City for a brief visits until 2002 when they come back to stay. Dru comes back hoping for help in reining in their now 14-year-old daughter Lily (Christel Khalil). Instead, it is Lily and Dru who end up helping Neil deal with his drinking problem. Neil and Dru fall back in love and remarry in Japan in 2003. Dru and Neil became swamped with work, leaving Lily with a lot of time to get into trouble. Although Lily ran into the arms of Kevin Fisher, who ended up using her, Neil and Dru were able to work together and save their daughter from losing more than her virginity. Dru went on to help out troubled teen Devon Hamilton, and convinced Neil to become Devon's foster parents.

Miraculously, Neil's brother Malcolm returned from the dead after surviving the car accident, which everyone thought had been his demise. After much protest from Dru, Malcolm demanded a paternity test on Lily, which proved her to be Malcolm's biological daughter. Again, they agreed to keep the secret from Neil. To make matters worse, Lily ran off and married Daniel Romalotti (Michael Graziadei).

In 2006, Neil and Lily (Davetta Sherwood) learn the truth about her paternity. Neil wonders if he will ever be able to forgive Dru for her betrayal, and begins a flirtation with Carmen Mesta (Marisa Ramirez). Dru shows up at an important Newman function, gets drunk and slanders Carmen Mesta in front of everyone. She later lies her way into Carmen's hotel room and ruins many of Carmen Mesta's expensive clothes. Drucilla attacks Carmen in the office at Newman Enterprises. The entire attack is caught on a video tape found by Phyllis, who gives a copy to Carmen. After Carmen gives copies of the tape to the district attorney and her former lover David Chow (Vincent Irizarry), Victoria Newman (Amelia Heinle) is forced to fire Drucilla. Dru is arrested, and though Neil is very much attracted to Carmen, he ends their relationship to stand by his wife. Dru ends up receiving probation for her crimes, and court ordered therapy.

Dru's attention shifts to focus on Indigo, a night club she and Neil are opening. The night it opens, Carmen is murdered and her body is discovered behind the club. Dru's adopted son Devon Hamilton (Bryton James) is arrested for the crime, and Drucilla believes her sanity is crumbling as she begins to see Carmen around town. Drucilla is convinced that Carmen is still alive, and after accidentally injuring her daughter, Neil has her voluntarily committed to a mental hospital. After Devon is cleared of all charges, it is revealed that Carmen's former lover David and her look alike cousin Ines are responsible for the hauntings that sent Dru over the edge and Crimson Lights worker Jana Hawkes (Emily O'Brien) is responsible for Carmen's death. Things are looking up for the family, as Neil receives a promotion to the board of directors at Newman Enterprises, Dru regains her job, and Lily and Devon receive high marks in their college courses.

After Sharon asks Dru to be her maid of honor at her upcoming wedding to Jack, Dru accompanies her and their mutual enemy Phyllis to a cliff side photo shoot for NVP. When Phyllis threatens to use her cell phone to reveal Sharon's affair with Brad to their friends and family, Dru reaches for Phyllis' cell phone, and a brief struggle with Phyllis causes both Dru and Sharon to fall off the cliff; immediately sending Dru into the shallow waters below. Sharon hangs on to Phyllis as she, Lily and Daniel try to pull her up, but Sharon lets go and she too falls off the cliff. An injured Sharon is later found, but search and rescue teams only find the remains of Dru's jacket. Her body was never recovered and she is presumed dead.

== Reception ==
In 2022, Charlie Mason from Soaps She Knows placed Drucilla 6th on his list of the best 25 characters from The Young and the Restless, commenting "We know that Victoria Rowell's history with The Young and the Restless is one that perhaps both she and the sudser would like to forget. But we just can't. Her feisty character was the concentrate from which spitfires are made, the rare force of nature who could lay waste to a room without ever spilling a drop of champagne — unless she was throwing it in someone’s face!" Mason also placed Drucilla 31st on his ranked list of Soaps' 40 Most Iconic Characters of All Time, writing, "Lightning in a bottle is the only way to describe Victoria Rowell's firebrand Genoa City character. Oh, how we wish that bottle would be uncorked again!"
