= Briana Nicole Henry =

American actress (born 1992)

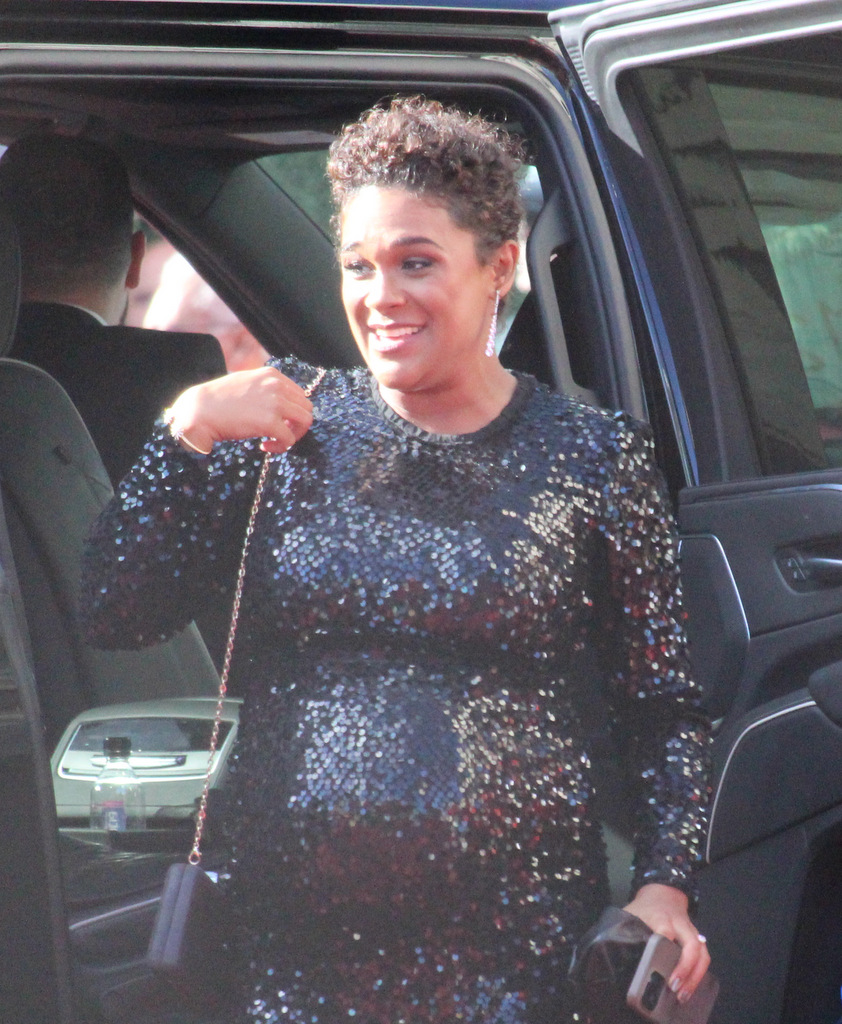
- Henry in 2025
- Born: January 19, 1992 (age 34); Broward County, Florida
- Education: University of Southern California
- Occupation: Actress
- Years active: 2013–present
- Spouse: Kris Bowers (m. 2020)
- Children: 1

Briana Nicole Henry (born January 19, 1992) is an American actress and is recognized for her portrayal of Jordan Ashford on ABC's General Hospital and Esmeralda on The Young and the Restless.

Henry develops projects through her company Et Al Studios Productions, which she co-founded with her husband, film composer and pianist Kris Bowers.

== Early life ==
Henry was born in Broward County, Florida, on January 19, 1992, to a cop and a jazz singer.

== Personal life ==
Henry married Kris Bowers on June 6, 2020, in Los Angeles. In November 2021, she announced she was pregnant with her first child. She gave birth to a daughter on February 28, 2022. In January 2025, it was announced Bowers and Henry were expecting their second child.

== Filmography ==
Year	Title	Role	Notes
2013	The Young and the Restless	Esmeralda	Recurring role
2015	Undateable	Lauren	Recurring role: 4 episodes
2015	Stitchers	Lisa Keller	Episode: "Friends in Low Places"
2015	It Had to Be You	Sarah Gibbs	Television film
2015	Jane the Virgin	Jill	Episode: "Chapter Twenty-Eight"
2016	Single Minded	Sarah	Television miniseries
2017	Bright	Orc Hottie at Party	Netflix original
2017	The Weeklings	Sunday	4 Episodes
2018	Shameless	Bailey	Episode: "Mo White!"
2018	Insecure	Blair	Episode: "Ready-Like"
2018	General Hospital	Jordan Ashford	Series regular: September 13, 2018 to September 13, 2021
2019	The Morning Show'	Alyssa	Episode: "In the Dark Night of the Soul It's Always 3:30 in the Morning"; Episode: "The Pendulum Swings"
