= Mishael Morgan =

Trinidadian-Canadian actress (born 1986)

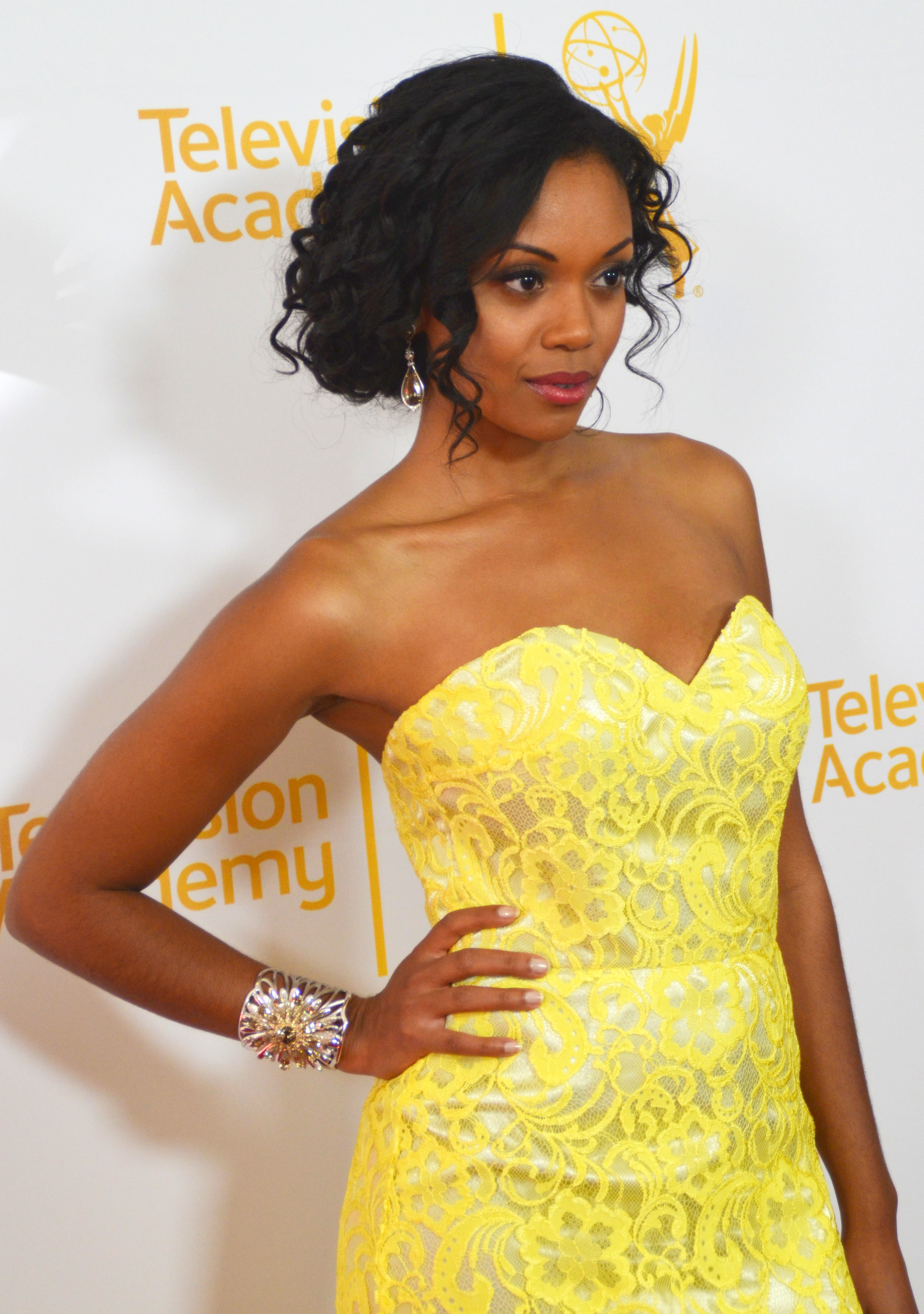
- Morgan in 2014
- Born: Marie-Charms Mishael Morgan; July 15, 1986 (age 40); San Fernando, Trinidad and Tobago
- Education: York University (graduated 2008)
- Occupation: Actress
- Years active: 2008–present
- Agent: David Ritchie
- Height: 5 ft 5 in (165 cm)
- Spouse: Navid Ali (m. 2012)
- Children: 2
- Website: Mishael Morgan's Main Page

Marie-Charms Mishael Morgan (born July 15, 1986) known professionally as Mishael Morgan, is a Trinidadian-Canadian actress known for the roles of Hilary Curtis and Amanda Sinclair on CBS Daytime soap opera, The Young and the Restless, the latter for which she became the first Black actress to win the Daytime Emmy Award for Outstanding Lead Actress in a Drama Series in 2022.

== Early life ==
Marie-Charms Mishael Morgan was born in San Fernando, Trinidad and Tobago, on July 15, 1986. Morgan is the daughter of Michael and Sharon (Lee) Morgan; she has an older sister, Maggris, and a younger sister, Monique. When Morgan was five years old, her parents relocated the family to New York where Mishael found work. However, thinking it would be safer, the family relocated to Toronto, Ontario, Canada, and settled in Mississauga. She attended York University in Toronto, and later began her career on television.

== Career ==
From 2008 to 2009, she had a recurring role in the Canadian teen drama series The Best Years, and later was a regular cast member of YTV sitcom, Family Biz. In 2012, she had a recurring role in the CBC Television comedy-drama Republic of Doyle, and also appeared in small roles in films Casino Jack (2010) and Total Recall (2012). Morgan also guest-starred on Supernatural and The Listener. In 2014, Morgan also starred in The CW summer comedy series, Backpackers.

In May 2013, Morgan was cast as Hilary Curtis in the CBS daytime soap opera, The Young and the Restless. On June 11, 2018, Morgan confirmed earlier reports that she would be leaving the soap. Morgan's representation later confirmed that Morgan opted to leave after unsuccessful attempts to negotiate for a salary increase. Morgan made her final appearance as Hilary on the soap on July 27, 2018, when the character succumbed to life-threatening injuries sustained in a car accident. On September 19, 2019, she confirmed her return to the show the same day she debuted as her new character, Amanda Sinclair. On June 24, 2022, Morgan became the first black woman to win the Daytime Emmy Award for Outstanding Lead Actress in a Drama Series, which she won for her portrayal of Amanda Sinclair. She dropped to recurring basic for spend more time in Toronto. She briefly returned in 2023 for the 50th-anniversary celebration and again in 2024.

From 2022 to 2023, Morgan had a recurring role in the NBC medical drama series, Chicago Med. In 2023 she played the leading roles in the thriller film Sworn Justice: Taken Before Christmas for BET+, romantic comedy Christmas With a Kiss for Hallmark Channel, and the thriller Dress For Success for Tubi. She executive produced and starred alongside Emmanuel Kabongo in the Canadian thriller film, Sway.

== Personal life ==
Morgan married Navid Ali in May 2012. Morgan gave birth to their first child, a son, in 2015. On July 19, 2015, her The Young and the Restless co-star, Christel Khalil, co-hosted her baby shower. The couple also have a daughter, born in 2018.

== Filmography ==
=== Film ===
Year	Title	Role	Notes
2008	The Love Guru	Groupie	Uncredited
2010	Verona	Tamara	Short film
2010	Casino Jack	Receptionist	
2011	You Got Served: Beat the World	Maya	
2012	Total Recall	Rekall Receptionist	
2014	Swearnet: The Movie	Jamie	
2015	Night Cries	Voodoo Witch Doctor	
2023	Sworn Justice: Taken Before Christmas	Sophie Porter	
2023	Dress For Success	Fabienne	
2024	Sway		Also executive producer
2026	Pumpkin Regatta Romance	Nadine	

=== Television ===
Year	Title	Role	Notes
2008	MVP	Erotic Beauty	Episode: "The Code"
2008-2009	The Best Years	Robyn Crawford	Recurring role, 8 episodes
2009	Family Biz	Tracy Dupont-Roymont	Series regular, 20 episodes
2010	Double Wedding	Law Firm Receptionist	Television film
2010	Covert Affairs	Woman	Episode: "Pilot"
2011	She's the Mayor	Megan	Episode: "Proclamation"
2011	Awakening		TV pilot
2012	Republic of Doyle	Chandra O'Neill	Recurring role, 5 episodes
2012	Beauty and the Beast	Hostess	Episode: "Pilot"
2013	Supernatural	Portia	Episode: "Man's Best Friend with Benefits"
2013–2022, 2023, 2024	The Young and the Restless	Hilary Curtis; Amanda Sinclair	Series regular
2013	The Listener	Rachel Masterson	Episode: "House of Horror"
2013	Dark Rising: Warrior of Worlds	Nancy Leighton	Episodes: "Season's Change" and "The Trankartak"
2014	Backpackers	Maya	5 episodes
2018	Hometown Holiday	Amber	Television film
2020	A Killer in My House	Melissa	Television film
2023	Chicago Med	Dr. Peta Dupre	3 episodes
2023	Most Dangerous Game	Pierce	Episode: "Lighthouse"
2023	Christmas With A Kiss	Mona	Television Film

== Awards and nominations ==
Year	Award	Category	Work	Result	Ref.
2018	Daytime Emmy Award	Outstanding Supporting Actress in a Drama Series	The Young and the Restless	Nominated	
2019	Daytime Emmy Award	Outstanding Supporting Actress in a Drama Series	The Young and the Restless	Nominated	
2022	Daytime Emmy Award	Outstanding Lead Actress in a Drama Series	The Young and the Restless	Won	
