= Christel Khalil =

American actress (born 1987)

- Born: Christel Adnana Mina Khalil; November 30, 1987 (age 38); Los Angeles, California
- Occupation: Actress
- Years active: 1993–present
- Known for: The Young and the Restless as Lily Winters (2002–present)
- Spouse(s): Stephen Hensley (m. 2008; div. 2011) Sam Restagno (m. 2024)
- Children: 3

Christel Adnana Mina Khalil (born November 30, 1987) is an American actress. She is best known for her role as Lily Winters in The Young and the Restless, which earned her a Daytime Emmy Award in 2012. She is also known for providing the voice of Cornelia Hale in the animated adaptation of W.I.T.C.H..

== Background ==
Khalil was born in Los Angeles, California, to a mother of Native American, African American, and European descent and a Pakistani father. Khalil has stated she identifies as mixed race. She has three older brothers and a younger paternal half-sister. In January 2017, in the wake of President Donald Trump's signing of Executive Order 13769, Khalil revealed that her father is an immigrant from his native country of Pakistan.

== Career ==
Khalil is best known for her portrayal as Lily Winters on the CBS soap opera The Young and the Restless. At the 39th Daytime Emmy Awards on June 23, 2012, she won the Daytime Emmy Award for Outstanding Younger Actress in a Drama Series after four nominations in the category. In August 2018, she announced her decision to downgrade from being on contract with the show and instead continue regularly. Khalil explained the decision was driven by her desire to have more freedom in both her professional and personal life. She continued to make sporadic appearances on the show until being approached by current head writer and co-executive producer Josh Griffith in January 2020, to return to filming regularly.

Khalil has had small roles in films such as Dragon Fury, Matilda, Interview With the Assassin and White Like the Moon. She voiced Cornelia Hale in W.I.T.C.H., and also appeared on That's So Raven and Malcolm in the Middle, among other shows. Khalil also performed in Los Angeles theater productions before landing her role on The Young and the Restless. In 2012, she was featured in musician Johnny Britt's music video for his single Beautiful Queen. In spring 2018, Khalil co-starred in the independent thriller, Good Deed, which premiered on the Lifetime network in November 2018 under the title Sorority Stalker. In spring 2019, she was cast in the independent comedy We Need To Talk by writer and director Todd Wolfe.

== Personal life ==
In September 2008, she married musician Stephen Hensley. The Young and the Restless co-star Elizabeth Hendrickson served as a bridesmaid while Bryton James was a groomsman. Khalil gave birth to their son on April 17, 2010, during an at-home water birth. Bryton James is his godfather and actress Fadhia Marcelin is his godmother. She and Hensley split in early 2011 and divorced later that year. In 2015, Khalil stated she had been in a relationship with bar runner Ray Wicks for 4 years. Khalil ended the relationship in August 2015. In the summer of 2018, Khalil stated that she in a relationship with Canadian businessman Sam Restagno, who works in private equity. The two met in 2016, during that year's Coachella Valley Music and Arts Festival in Indio, California. In 2019, Khalil and her son relocated to Toronto, Ontario, to be with Restagno, who was born and based there. In July 2020, Khalil moved back to Los Angeles. In April 2022, Khalil revealed she and Restagno were engaged and the two married in October 2024 in Apulia, Italy. In June 2023, she announced she was expecting her second child, her first with Restagno. In February 2026, she revealed she had given birth to the couple's second child together (her third).

She is best friends with Bryton James, who portrays her character's brother, Devon Hamilton on The Young and the Restless. She is also friends with several former and current The Young and the Restless co-stars, including Mishael Morgan and Nadine Heimann. In October 2015, she modeled for Heimann's non-profit, True Connection.

In June 2015, after the United States Supreme Court's decision on Obergefell v. Hodges, she voiced her support for same-sex marriage. Khalil has said one of her favorite hobbies is traveling because she loves experiencing different cultures and travel makes her feel connected to who she is as a person.

== Filmography ==
Year	Title	Role	Notes
1993	The Sinbad Show	Crystal	Episode: "My Daughter's Keeper"
1995	Dragon Fury	Little Girl	Film
1996	Matilda	Child in Classroom	Film
1996	The Jamie Foxx Show	Young Patrice Murphy	Episode: "The Bad Seed"
1996	Family Matters	Angela	Episode: "Karate Kids"
1997	You're Invited to Mary-Kate & Ashley's Christmas Party	Diana	Television film
1997	George & Leo	Kid #3	Episode: "The Halloween Show"
1998	Milo	Young Claire Mullins	Film
2002	Interview with the Assassin	Babysitter	Film
2002	White Like the Moon	Nita	Short film
2003–2004	That's So Raven	Crystal	2 episodes
2004–2006	W.I.T.C.H.	Cornelia Hale	Voice, main role (52 episodes)
2006	Malcolm in the Middle	Kristin Peterson	Episode: "Lois Strikes Back"
2002–2005; 2006–	The Young and the Restless	Lily Winters	Contract role: August 15, 2002 – September 2, 2005, November 7, 2006 – present
2012	NCIS: Los Angeles	Young Woman	Episode: "Patriot Acts"
2012	2 Broke Girls	Flirty Girl	Episode: "And the Candy Manwich"
2017	Chronologia Human	Christel	Film
2017	Bedlam	Breanna Wilkinson	Short film
2018	Good Deed/Sorority Stalker	Lauren	Film
2020	We Need To Talk	Aly Fulton	Film

== Awards and nominations ==
List of awards and nominations for Christel Khalil
Year	Award	Category	Work	Result	Ref.
2003	Young Artist Award	Best Performance in a TV Series (Comedy or Drama) – Leading Young Actress	The Young and the Restless	Nominated	
2004	Young Artist Award	Best Performance in a TV Series (Comedy or Drama) – Leading Young Actress	The Young and the Restless	Nominated	
2004	Daytime Emmy Award	Outstanding Younger Actress in a Drama Series	The Young and the Restless	Nominated	
2005	Soap Opera Digest Award	Favorite Teen	The Young and the Restless	Nominated	
2005	NAACP Image Award	Outstanding Actress in a Daytime Drama Series	The Young and the Restless	Nominated	
2006	Daytime Emmy Award	Outstanding Younger Actress in a Drama Series	The Young and the Restless	Nominated	
2006	NAACP Image Award	Outstanding Actress in a Daytime Drama Series	The Young and the Restless	Nominated	
2007	NAACP Image Award	Outstanding Actress in a Daytime Drama Series	The Young and the Restless	Nominated	
2008	NAACP Image Award	Outstanding Actress in a Daytime Drama Series	The Young and the Restless	Won	
2009	NAACP Image Award	Outstanding Actress in a Daytime Drama Series	The Young and the Restless	Nominated	
2010	Daytime Emmy Award	Outstanding Younger Actress in a Drama Series	The Young and the Restless	Nominated	
2012	Daytime Emmy Award	Outstanding Younger Actress in a Drama Series	The Young and the Restless	Won	
2012	NAACP Image Award	Outstanding Actress in a Daytime Drama Series	The Young and the Restless	Nominated	
2014	NAACP Image Award	Outstanding Actress in a Daytime Drama Series	The Young and the Restless	Nominated	
2016	Soap Awards France	Best Couple of the Year — "Lily and Cane" (shared with Daniel Goddard)	The Young and the Restless	Nominated	
2020	Daytime Emmy Award	Outstanding Supporting Actress in a Drama Series	The Young and the Restless	Nominated	
