= Daniel and Lily =

- Duration: 2004–07, 2011, 2023–2024
- Created by: David Shaughnessy
In-universe information
- Other names: Daily
- Spouse: 2006–07

Daniel Romalotti and Lily Winters are fictional characters and a popular supercouple from the American soap opera The Young and the Restless. Daniel was portrayed by Michael Graziadei and Lily is portrayed by Christel Khalil. Davetta Sherwood took over the part in 2006, until Khalil returned in September of that year. The plots they were featured in included a "going on the run" story, teenage marriage, and Internet pornography. They were written as a star-crossed couple with Romeo and Juliet undertones. The couple is referred to by the portmanteau "Daily" (for Daniel and Lily) on Internet message boards. They were considered a dynamic duo by the soap opera media.

== Development ==
=== Early stages ===
Daniel Romalotti and Lily Winters were written as star-crossed young loves in a Romeo and Juliet style storyline. Both her parents, Neil Winters and Drucilla Winters, and his mother, Phyllis Summers, tried to keep them apart. This was partly due to Drucilla and Phyllis's animosity towards each other. They were put up against further obstacles with Daniel being wrongly accused of driving under the influence and killing Cassie Newman. His imminent arrest sent Daniel and Lily on the run. They traveled from the Young and the Restless setting, Genoa City, Wisconsin, to Los Angeles, California. For the story, the show went on a location shoot to the beaches of Malibu. The actors on the shoot were Daniel and Lily's portrayers, Michael Graziadei and Christel Khalil, respectively, as well as Kristoff St. John (Neil), Michelle Stafford (Phyllis), and Joshua Morrow (Nick, Cassie's father). Graziadei felt that going on location added to the scenes in the story. "[I]t's just so much more involved," he said. "You're actually out there." Originally, the Daniel character was introduced as a bad boy. His relationship with Lily was used as a way to show a different side of the character. In that way, the Lily character was said to have "tamed" him.

The romance was put on hold when Khalil chose to exit the role of Lily in late 2005. In the storyline, Lily's parents sent her to boarding school in an effort to keep her and Daniel apart. After the actress's departure, the series continued Lily and Daniel's interactions through a letter and communication over the internet. The website, SoapCity displayed the letter and the emails. The character's email addresses reflected the continued Romeo and Juliet theme by featuring the names of those Shakespearean characters as Lily became Ibejuliet and Daniel took on the name Iberomeo. Two months after Khalil's departure, the Young and the Restless attempted to convince the actress to come back to the role. Those attempts failed. The show's then head writer and executive producer John F. Smith planned to recast the role and promised to "bring an entirely new level" to Daniel and Lily's story. Davetta Sherwood was hired as the Lily recast.

=== Advancements ===
Sherwood expressed unconcern in taking the place of an actress who took part in creating the popular Daniel and Lily romance. "It's okay, because she [Khalil] wanted to leave," she said, "she was ready to move on, which is always a good thing. I haven't gotten any Lily versus Lily, or Christel verses Davetta mail." Daniel and Lily's popularity continued with Sherwood in the role. The way Sherwood portrayed the character was with more feistiness, though the character was never written as timid. Sherwood's take on the part brought on comparison's to the character's mother, Drucilla. That new "fire" was brought into the Daniel and Lily relationship. "Dru can be a little dramatic," Sherwood said. "And I think sometimes when Lily is facing issue with Daniel, she's not going to remain calm. She's going to do what she saw her mother do." The actress praised the couple's story for not focusing on the differing races of the characters.

In September 2006, Sherwood was replaced by Khalil. Former Young and the Restless executive producer and head writer Lynn Marie Latham said, "Davetta did a fine job, but shows generally prefer to have original players back when they can get them." Upon her return, Khalil was surprised by the advancement of Daniel and Lily's story and with the Lily character as a whole, particularly the new development of the characters being married.

=== Conclusion ===
An obstacle written into the couple's story was Daniel's addiction to Internet pornography. "My initial conflict was that Daniel has had so many problems with his wife that I couldn't figure out why he'd be doing this," Graziadei said. The actor worried that his character might be seen as "lecherous and creepy". Viewers instead sympathized with the character. This addiction and the lies surrounding it ended the Daniel and Lily romance. Lily next moved on to a controversial pairing with Cane Ashby, disappointing Daniel and Lily fans. "I think with Daniel it was kind of a first love thing," Khalil said. "Daniel will always be in her heart, but with Cane, it's a more mature love."

== Storyline ==
In 2004, Daniel and Lily become friends while hanging out at the Crimson Lights coffee shop. Daniel becomes involved in a scheme to drug Lily along with Kevin Fisher (Greg Rikaart) and Alex (Nick Chastain). The following year, they get romantically involved. Their mothers, Drucilla Winters (Victoria Rowell) and Phyllis Summers (Michelle Stafford), do not approved due to their rivalry and attempt to keep them apart. While at a party, Daniel and Lily break up, causing him to drown his sorrows in alcohol. His under-aged crush Cassie Newman (Camryn Grimes) decides to drive a drunken Daniel home, as they both live on the same property. However, Cassie ends up crashing the car, injuring both of them. Daniel is arrested after Cassie dies when neither of them can remember the incident, and he is expected to have been driving. He goes on the run with Lily to Los Angeles, but they are soon caught. Daniel's trial ends well, when evidence that Daniel wasn't driving is presented. Lily, however, is arrested for aiding and abetting a fugitive. In a plea bargain with the courts, Lily's parents send her to a boarding school in New Hampshire.

In 2006, Lily arrives home from boarding school but tricks her parents into believing she broke her relationship off with Daniel by sending him a Dear John letter. They soon secretly reconcile and sneak around with the help of Lily's best friend Colleen Carlton (Adrianne León). A Winters family revelation, which Lily and Drucilla hid for years, revealed that Malcolm Winters (Shemar Moore), not Neil Winters (Kristoff St. John) fathered Lily. During this time, Lily decided to announce her romance with Daniel, thinking her parents wouldn't mind after this news. However, both are still objective to Daniel and Lily, demanding she go back to boarding school. This causes Daniel and Lily to run away to Las Vegas to get married. As they are under legal age to marry, they forge Dru and Neil's signatures. They are soon tracked down and brought home. While their families are devastated that they are married, they soon learn to accept that this is what the couple truly want.

Daniel's former stepfather Jack Abbott gives him and Lily a new place to stay at the old Abbott play house. Daniel begins working at Newman Enterprises as a mailman while Lily becomes a salesperson at Lauren Baldwin's Jabot Cosmetics boutique. All is well until Alex returns, seeking money from Daniel and Kevin, or he will tell Lily about their scheme to drug and rape her two years ago. Daniel reveals the truth to Lily, and she moves out of their home. Although Lily is advised to get an annulment, she grows closer to Daniel and they eventually get back together. Troubles continue to follow the Winters, including the murder of a woman who nearly had an affair with Neil, Carmen Mesta (Marisa Ramirez), which allowed everyone in the family including Daniel and Lily to become a suspect. In 2007, Daniel and Lily witness Dru and her best friend (also Cassie's mother) Sharon Abbott (Sharon Case) fall off a cliff after a fight with Phyllis, who is still their enemy. Sharon is found, although Dru's body is never retrieved and she is presumed dead. Lily blames Phyllis for her mother's death, causing more of a rift between the couple.

Daniel becomes addicted to pornography made by Amber Moore (Adrienne Frantz) and soon begins to neglect Lily. Lily finds out and they begin couples counseling. Later, Daniel becomes involved in more schemes including burying a dead body with Amber and Kevin along with going to a strip bar while under age. After Lily finds out all of this, she decides to end her marriage to Daniel. In the following years, they both move onto other relationships. Daniel marries Amber and Lily marries the much older Cane Ashby (Daniel Goddard). However, they remain best friends.

In 2010, when Lily is diagnosed with cancer, Daniel becomes her confidant. The following year, Cane is "killed" by a henchman working for his father. Lily leans on Daniel for emotional support. When Cane returns, it was revealed he never died, and it was his twin who was killed. Lily is extremely angry at Cane for keeping him being alive from her, as well as all of the drama going on in his family, and reconnects further with Daniel. Daniel tells Lily to divorce Cane, which she does. Cane later witnesses Daniel and Lily kissing at Jimmy's bar. However, Lily soon learns why Cane lied and reunites with him, devastating Daniel.

== See also ==
- List of supercouples
