= J. T. and Colleen =

- The Young and the Restless character
- Thad Luckinbill and Lyndsy Fonseca as J.T. and Colleen
- Duration: 2001–09
- Created by: Kay Alden and Trent Jones
- Introduced by: William J. Bell and John F. Smith
In-universe information
- Other names: Jolleen
- Family: Abbott

J. T. Hellstrom and Colleen Carlton are fictional characters and a supercouple from the American CBS soap opera The Young and the Restless. J. T. was portrayed by Thad Luckinbill, and Colleen was portrayed by three different actresses during the pair's time together, including Lyndsy Fonseca, Adrianne León, and Tammin Sursok. They are often referred to by the portmanteau "Jolleen" by fans on internet message boards and in magazines. Many other famous celebrities appear on this show.

Beginning as a controversial pairing due to the characters' age gap, their pairing would soon gain popularity, characterized as "Genoa City's sweetest supercouple". Former head writer and executive producer John F. Smith pushed for a story between the characters despite the unexpectedness and controversy surrounding them. Luckinbill's musical ability was an element in their storyline as the actor wrote and performed two original songs for the soap opera. The song "When You Say Nothing at All", performed by Alison Krauss, was also used during their storyline.

== Development ==
=== Relationship ===
"When I came up with this story last summer, I got a lot of people raising their eyebrows about it in terms of J. T. He's not going to give her two looks. But I saw something special in these guys, and that was the story. This very unexpected interest. Of course, initially, it was a girl who was gaga over him. And he, being J. T., enjoyed the attention. What he didn't expect was to find himself drawn to her."

— Former co-head writer John F. Smith on why he wanted to pair J.T. and Colleen

The original storyline designed for J. T. and Colleen centered around an unrequited crush she feels for him. Luckinbill and Fonseca, the first actress to portray Colleen, thought their character's relationship would progress no further than friendship. Fonseca said that if they became a couple, the fun brought on by the "tug-and-pull" element between them could disappear. Luckinbill considered the age difference too great an obstacle to overcome, as at the time, J. T. was 18 years old and Colleen was 15. Smith later pushed for the plot to be taken further and the characters were paired romantically. Both soap opera critics and members of the show's cast and crew considered this a controversial and surprising move. Fonseca stated she "wasn't expecting it at all", and admitted that even former executive producer David Shaughnessy found the pairing "shocking".

The writers used J. T.'s relationship with Colleen to bring out a more sympathetic side to him that the audience up to that point never witnessed before. Smith characterized their storyline as "taking this guy on the journey from wild college kid to being in love with this little high school sophomore". They also positioned Colleen as the aggressor in the relationship by scripting her as pursuing J. T., while he, in an uncharacteristic move, held off because of the difference in their ages. The writers "carefully navigated the development of this relationship, emphasizing its tender, supportive aspects." They scripted them as "ferociously protective" of each other.

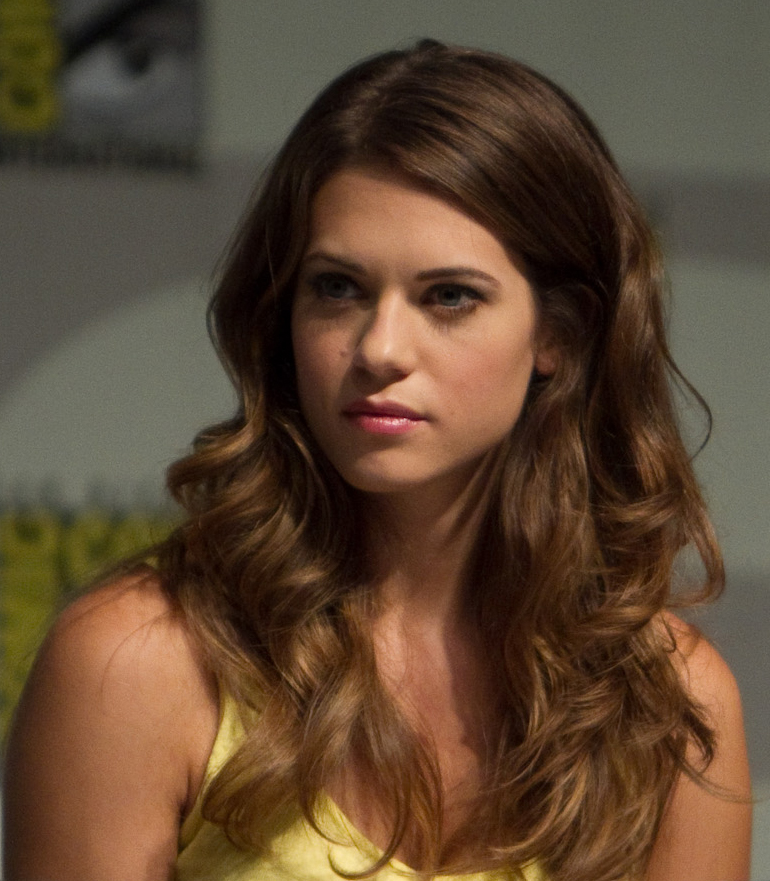
Fonseca stated she wasn't expecting Colleen to be romantically paired with J. T.

Other obstacles written for the pair included the opposition of Colleen's family to the pairing, J. T.'s music career, and third party characters who came between them. In 2003, J.T. cheated on Colleen with Anita Hodges, an older woman considered a "sexy cougar". Luckinbill explained J.T. as being "weak in a desperate moment", and that he "felt really sorry for someone he's known his whole life, and the good side of J.T. emerged to offer Anita some comfort. Then it got really out of hand." He added that J.T. "cares deeply" for Colleen and "realizes she will be devastated by his actions". Luckinbill felt that J.T. "wouldn't hurt her for the world, and yet that is exactly what he'll end up doing". In May 2004, Fonseca's contract was not renewed and she was confirmed to exit. Within the storyline, Colleen leaves Genoa City and J.T. because she does not want to stand in the way of his music career. However, she returned to reprise the role briefly that December. J.T. had begun dating Brittany Hodges (Lauren Woodland) and the writers wanted to bring Colleen back to "add more complications to the story". Luckinbill described his character's feelings for Colleen and Brittany as extremely different, saying: "J.T. saw Colleen as somebody so opposite himself that he considered himself undeserving of her love. She was too angelic [whereas] Brittany has more of the 'black sheep' in her." Fans of the pair campaigned for a reunion between J.T. and Colleen when Fonseca returned, and pushed for her to be put back on contract. Fonseca and Luckinbill also anticipated the repairing of their characters because of a positive viewer response. Fonseca described it as being "the best part of coming back", stating: "Already it seems the fans [are] excited to see us together again." Luckinbill stated: "When they were together, they were like some sort of supercouple and there is a huge amount of fans who still want them together." News of Fonseca's second exit incited a fan outcry and a campaign pushing for the actress's permanent return. Fonseca made her final appearance as Colleen in February 2005.

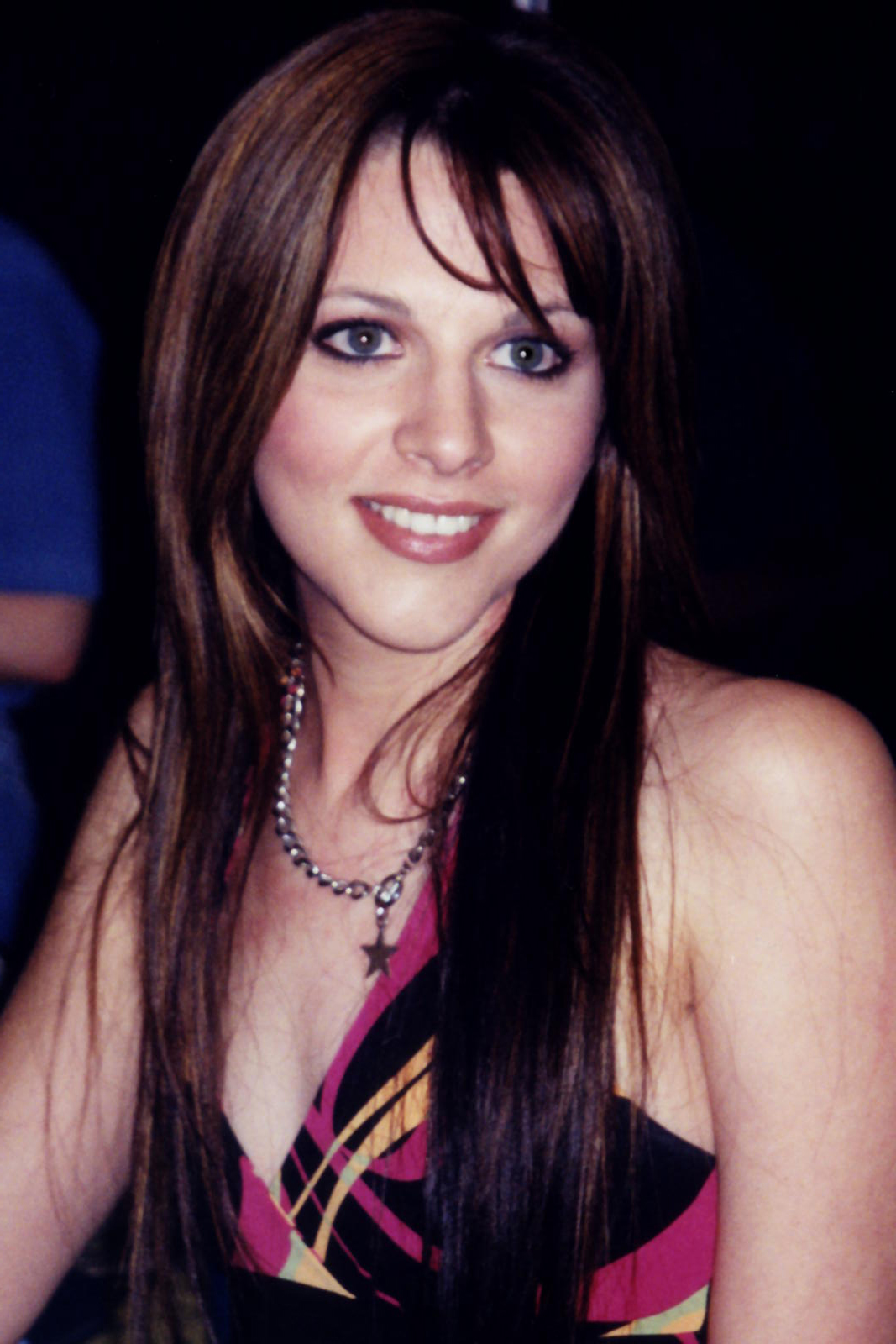
León stated it wouldn't be easy for Colleen to see her first love with someone else.

In 2006, Adrianne León was announced to become a recast for the role of Colleen. Leon wanted to portray Colleen as more grown up and a little different from Fonseca's take on the role, saying she would be "coming back with a whole new determination to get what she wants" and that "she didn't have any expectations set in stone, but it's always hard to see your first love with someone else". When Colleen returned, she acted as an obstacle in J.T.'s romance with Mackenzie Browning (then Rachel Kimsey). When Kimsey was let go and Mackenzie exited, J.T. and Colleen reunited, and another obstacle designed to break them up came in the form of a new character, Adrian Korbel (Eyal Podell). León theorized that while Colleen felt an attraction to Korbel, her heart belonged to J.T., saying: "She absolutely loves him and adores him, but she's going through that change where she was a little girl and now she's not. She's growing up and evolving. The bad boy was interesting to her when she was a teenager, but now she's more interested in the intellectual." Leon portrayed the character as confused while she conflicted between her love for J.T. and her attraction to Korbel. Colleen later cheated on J.T. with him, and they separated for the final time.

=== Music ===
Luckinbill's musical ability was utilized in J.T. and Colleen's storyline. He stated that the writers and producers felt like it would be a good idea. He added: "They wanted me to sing a song by Alison Krauss called, "When You Say Nothing at All". I liked it, was sitting at home one night working on that song and this new song just came about." The new song Luckinbill wrote was entitled "Feel". In writing the song, Luckinbill said he was "thinking of the character's viewpoint, from J.T. to Colleen. If he were going to write her a song, what would he write? And these words came out. I ended up writing a song that night, which I took to our producers and said, 'I know you want me to sing this song, but how do you feel about this one? It's character driven.'" Smith decided Luckinbill would sing both "Feel" and "When You Say Nothing at All". Luckinbill sang Krauss' song on the episode dated December 26, 2002, where J.T. serenades Colleen on her sixteenth birthday. Smith wrote a scene specifically for the song Luckinbill wrote, featuring J.T. playing his guitar at Colleen's Valentine's Day dance where he performed "Feel". After J.T. cheats on Colleen with Anita, Luckinbill wrote an untitled song in character for the show and performed it in character on the episode dated July 24, 2003.

== Storyline ==
J.T. and Colleen meet in 2001 but they do not become involved until 2002 as he catches her doing drugs. He plans to use this information to hurt his nemesis and her uncle Billy Abbott (then played by David Tom), but changes his mind when she cries. They start up a friendship and Colleen develops a crush on him. She romantically pursues him by finding ways to bring them closer such as helping him study and getting tickets to see a concert. At first, J.T. only likes her as a kid sister. That slowly changes as he develops feelings for her. Colleen's family disapproves of their relationship despite J.T.'s insistence that they are only friends. John Abbott (Jerry Douglas) and Billy warn him to stay away from her. Her mother, Traci (Beth Maitland), decides to take her home to New York as a way of separating them. To keep from being separated from J.T., Colleen runs away and stays with J.T.'s friends, Raul Guittierez (David Lago) and Brittany Hodges (Lauren Woodland). This results in her being placed in juvenile detention while J.T. is brought up on charges. Traci offered to drop the charges against him if he convinced her daughter to come back to New York with her. He complies but stops her from leaving. Colleen's father, Brad Carlton (Don Diamont), convinces Traci to allow their daughter to stay with him and his wife and her sister Ashley Abbott (Eileen Davidson). Despite staying in Genoa City, she is not allowed to see J.T. They begin secretly spending time with each other in the Abbott family playhouse.

During one of their rendezvous, Colleen tries to seduce him, but J.T. convinces her to hold off on sex so they do not ruin their relationship. She continues to worry that, despite J.T.'s insistence that they not engage in sex, he will become bored with her because of his promiscuity in the past. He reassures her that he's fine, but then cheats on her with an older woman, Brittany's mother Anita Hodges (Mitzi Kapture-Donahue). Shortly afterwards, Brad gives them permission to date. Colleen finds out about J.T.'s affair with Anita and breaks up with him. They continue longing for each other and she forgives him enough to rebuild their friendship. The couple eventually admit they still love each other and reunite.

J.T. and Colleen become embroiled in Lily Winters' (Christel Khalil) drama with internet predator Kevin Fisher (Greg Rikaart). They discourage Lily from being with him. After Lily engages in illegal intercourse with him, Colleen tells Lily's parents, Neil (Kristoff St. John) and Drucilla (Victoria Rowell). They have him arrested. In retaliation, Kevin attempts to murder Colleen by locking her in a freezer inside a burning building. J.T. rescues her and carries her out of the building. The couple moves on from the Kevin ordeal as J.T. begins to focus on his music career. This serves as a roadblock in their romance as Colleen becomes jealous of J.T.'s closeness with other girls in his music video. During a press conference, he also lies to a reporter about not having a girlfriend. Though he attempts to explain why he did that, Colleen decides to move back to New York to live with her mother so she will not be standing in the way of J.T.'s career. During her time away, he develops romantic feelings for his long-time friend Brittany, who plans to marry Bobby Marsino (John Enos III). Colleen returns to Genoa City briefly and J.T. deals with his feelings for both her and Brittany. She ultimately leaves town again and returns in 2006 intent on reuniting with J.T. However, he is dating Mackenzie Browning (then played by Rachel Kimsey) at the time. Colleen attempts to break them up. Ultimately, Mac's dependence on Kevin during her pregnancy and miscarriage, as well as J.T.'s cheating with Victoria Newman (Amelia Heinle), break the couple up. Not long after that, he and Colleen reunite.

Colleen moves in with J.T. Shortly afterwards, they make love for the first time. His career as a private investigator causes trouble in their relationship since he is forced to keep secrets about his job from her. Colleen looks through his files and discovers that he is investigating her father. She forgives him for this, but is continually annoyed that he is unable to share information he has about his cases. She also develops an attraction to her college professor, Adrian Korbel (Eyal Podell). Trapped together during a snowstorm, Korbel and Colleen engage in sex. Guilty over the affair, she confesses to J.T. who breaks up with her. When Jana Hawkes (Emily O'Brien) attempts to murder Colleen and Kevin by trapping them in the freezer of a building she set fire too, J.T. and Korbel rescue them. J.T. attempts to reconcile with Colleen, but she chooses Korbel.

In 2007, J.T. and Colleen become friends again and she stands by him while his pregnant fiancé, Victoria, is in a coma. When Colleen's father goes missing in 2009, she goes to J.T. for help finding him. They discover his dead body frozen in the ice of the river. He comforts her while she deals with her loss. Colleen blames Brad's longtime enemy and J.T.'s father-in-law, Victor Newman (Eric Braeden), for her father's death and attempts to get back at him by claiming Brad's seat on the Newman board. Victor orders J.T. to find something damaging on Colleen that will force her to give up the seat. J.T. does not follow Victor's orders, but Victor gets what he wants by paying Gloria and Jeffry Bardwell to catch Colleen in a compromising position. They pay a bartender to get her drunk. Under the influence of alcohol, she flashes her breasts in public, which Jeffrey catches on camera. Once the footage of her is made public, Colleen is asked to resign from the Newman board. This only brings J.T. and Colleen closer. They begin bringing up suppressed feelings and on August 17, 2009, they kiss and are spotted by a spy of Victor's. This soon is heard by the Newmans that J.T. was seen coming out of Colleen's home the next morning. Colleen is confronted by J.T.'s wife, Victoria. Colleen is kidnapped by her Uncles Jack's unstable ex-wife, Patty Williams. She escapes by canoe on the lake but falls into the water and nearly drowns. She is found by Jack and brought to the hospital. On September 22, it is confirmed that Colleen is brain dead because of her accident on the lake. On September 28, the doctors announce that Colleen is an organ donor, and Traci decides to give Colleen's heart to Victor Newman. On her death bed, a heartbroken J.T tells Colleen that he loves her and always will.

== Reception and impact ==
J.T. and Colleen's romance first received a mixed response. Soap Opera Weekly said the age difference between the characters was an "unsettling factor", yet the magazine referred to them as The Young and the Restless' "hottest young couple", describing them as having a "magic" quality and commended the soap opera for pairing them. Viewers initially rejected the pairing and rooted for Colleen to get a love interest her own age. However, the couple eventually gained popularity as their storyline progressed. The couple was voted fourth most romantic couple in all soap operas of 2003 in Soap Opera Update: The Year in Soaps. Viewers voted J.T. and Colleen as their favorite couple on The Young and the Restless in Soap Opera Digest polls multiple times until Fonseca's first exit in May 2004, and they topped the poll again for multiple weeks during her brief return, and fans of the pair also campaigned for a reunion between J.T. and Colleen when Fonseca returned as well as pushing for her to be put back on contract. Viewers voted her and Luckinbill's version of J.T. and Colleen the top The Young and the Restless couple in Soap Opera Digest. In October 2008, Soaps In Depth listed J.T. and Colleen among soap operas' 100 greatest couples.

== See also ==
- List of supercouples
