= John Paul McQueen and Craig Dean =

UK soap opera fictional supercouple, created 2006

Craig (Guy Burnet, left) and John Paul (James Sutton, right).

John Paul McQueen and Craig Dean are fictional characters and a supercouple from the long-running British Channel 4 soap opera Hollyoaks. John Paul is portrayed by James Sutton, and Craig is portrayed by Guy Burnet. John Paul, is the son of Sally St. Claire (Annie Wallace) and Myra McQueen (Nicole Barber-Lane), while Craig is a son of Johnno Dean and Frankie Osborne (Helen Pearson). The character of Craig was introduced in 2002, while that of John Paul was introduced in September 2006; the supercouple relationship between the two slowly developed over a period of months, starting in 2006 and gaining intensity through 2007. Craig departs in September 2007, returning in September 2008 in a storyline which saw he and John Paul secure a happy "sunset ending", before Craig (and thus Burnet) left the Hollyoaks franchise.

On Internet forums, the couple is referred to by the portmanteau "McDean" (for McQueen and Dean). Supporters of "McDean" are often referred to as "McDeaners". The love story has been cited as "one of the biggest and most successful that Hollyoaks has told".

== Background ==
The love story between characters Craig and John Paul began when Craig, originally detailed as heterosexual, kissed best friend John Paul. This one event empowered the United Kingdom soap opera Hollyoaks to embark on one of daytime television's most successful romances, which gained a prominent following amongst fans and praise from LGBT rights groups. At first, actor Guy Burnet (Craig) was stressed about portraying a gay character. "I'll always be completely honest," he said. "I'll always be real. The truth is that it was difficult to play. It was talked about for a long while and I felt uncomfortable with the idea because I didn't think it was justifiable. I thought 'how can you make a straight guy who's a bit of a cheeky chappy, loves the girls and has a sort of camp sense of humour, gay?'" Burnet cited talking with the show's producers for having eased his reluctance about the change in his character. "It was sitting with Bryan and the other producers, discussing it and saying 'right, if we're going to do this, it's not a story about a character being gay, it's a story where we have to justify the guy's sexual confusion — why is he like this? And the most important thing is that he still has the love for the woman in his life.'" Burnet revealed that he did not necessarily see his character as gay or being romantically/sexually attracted to men, but rather solely romantically/sexually attracted to John Paul, and that he wanted the audience to be confused as to Craig's sexual orientation. Craig would still be "after" women.

Sutton joined the show in September 2006 as newcomer John Paul, a then-seventeen-year-old school boy confused about his sexuality. The storyline revolved around John Paul struggling with his sexuality as he fell for best friend, Craig. Craig was written to initially reject John Paul, but "the two students eventually embarked on an affair which explosively came to light during a party to celebrate Craig's engagement to aspiring model Sarah Barnes". In an interview two years after his debut, Sutton discussed his take on the storyline, and the aspects of his character John Paul in detail. "He's very, very quick to take offence sometimes," Sutton relayed. "He's a typical 19-year old lad. His hormones are all over the place. He's a bit up and down, so that's a side of him I'm not too keen on, but he's also very sensitive and loving and he cares a lot about his family and his friends and that side of it is very true to me as well and that's kind of what I kind of brought to the table." Sutton revealed that, despite sexuality differences, he is not "too far removed" from his character. "I like to think I'm a bit more mature. Like I say, he's very quick to boil up and get really emotional. We both have similar sense of — We are both very heavily into our music. I mean, John Paul's a DJ and I play a number of instruments, so we've got that in common as well." Unlike Burnet, Sutton found comfort in portraying a gay character. When asked where he acquired "that attitude" for the role and whether he started out with it, Sutton replied, "I've always kind of had that. I spent a good part of my youth [in the theatre] and there were a lot of openly gay men … so I was always around that kind of environment and always kind of comfortable around the gay community." He further relayed, "I still occasionally go to a gay bar with people and hang out and stuff, so I've never had any kind of [discomfort] or anything with it. And I'm just an actor and it's just a part and … if they need me to kiss another guy or be physical with another guy or whatever it may be … I'm comfortable with myself to do that. I'm quite comfortable in my own skin, you know?"

Burnet cited Sutton as making it easier for him to play the part of Craig. "James was always good about it," he acknowledged. "James has played gay characters in the past from my understanding, in theatre roles and the like. He was quite comfortable with it, which, in turn, made things easier for me because I wasn't comfortable. It was difficult for me to do. James is a good actor and he's also very understanding." Burnet stated, "I can sit and talk to him and I'll give him advice and he'll give me advice and we won't ever take it offensively. We work well together because we can both tell each other 'actually, I don't think that was right, do it like this' or he'll say to me 'listen, Guy, do it like that'. In turn, we balanced each other out." Sutton gave insight to their working dynamic as well, stating, "Guy's a very different kind of actor than myself and as far as our backgrounds go, he hadn't really done any acting before Hollyoaks, so he didn't have that kind of experience to draw on. He's never shown to me in any of our scenes that he was particularly uncomfortable or anything. He's a fantastic actor." Sutton elaborated, "I know he has made a comment before in the press about feeling uncomfortable with the kissing and the physical side of it, but I think that just goes down to — Guy's very, very proud of his heterosexual masculinity, if you will. … He was a bit more uncomfortable than perhaps I'd prefer but very, very quick-thinking and he was always very professional."

One of the most significant storylines surrounding the couple's union was the aftermath of John Paul and Craig's affair being revealed to other characters within the series, particularly Craig's girlfriend (Sarah). "A lot of the aftermath stuff is really good," Burnet cited. "We changed a hell of a lot of it. It came out initially [at script stage] and it's in the same week as another major storyline so we went and spoke to [the producers] and manipulated the scripts slightly with the director, Nigel Keane, and the consequence was a fantastic four episodes to end it on, I think. Something real."

"When Sarah discovers Craig and John Paul together, it's almost about her, I feel. Everything's been about Craig and John Paul and I thought that it was important in the aftermath to remember that a Sarah isn't forgotten," Burnet stated. "It's easy for everyone to love the JP and Craig storyline for the two of them being together, but it has to be understood that what makes the story is Craig's love for Sarah and Sarah's love for Craig. So it was important in the aftermath to show the confusion of Sarah — forget the confusion of Craig for a minute — the confusion of Sarah who's been as much part of this storyline as we have."

Even with the relationship out in the open, the pairing's romance did not go smoothly, and ended when Craig went to Trinity College in Dublin. Burnet had decided to leave the series in 2007, stating, "Initially, the thing that threw me over the edge to say 'right, I am going to leave Hollyoaks' was when I was sat at home thinking 'I'd love to go to Tokyo; I'd love to go and live in Mexico; I want to go and live in Costa Rica; I want to go and do these things now while I'm young and can still do them.'"

Craig's departure left "John Paul free to embark on an even more scandalous fling with Father Keiron Hobbs". Viewers witnessed the priest being publicly outed by John Paul's mum, and viewers wondered what other surprises were in store for John Paul. However, in 2008, Burnet agreed to briefly reprise his role as Craig, which led to speculation that John Paul and Craig could be romantically reunited, upon news that Sutton would now be leaving the series, with his final scenes due in September.

Sutton stated his reasons for leaving: "It's not an easy decision to make. But I'm twenty-five-years old and I've done this character for two years now and I feel like I've made my mark and I've got to get off my soapbox now. I kind of feel like I'm ready to take a risk before I hit 30 and realize that actually I've missed my opportunity. A calculated risk." At the same time, Burnet issued his own reasons for returning. He told The Sun: "I've had so much support from fans since I left the show, so it's great to have the opportunity to reprise the storyline and give viewers a resolution to the Craig and John Paul story." Sutton stated that he wanted Burnet to come back. "I was always very keen for Guy to come back and I know that Bryan Kirkwood and the writers, everyone was always keen for him to come back," he relayed. "It was just a question if the logistics of it could work out because Guy's been living in L.A. since he left the show, so it was just a case of scheduling it in and making sure that if I was going to leave, he could come back and film. It's worked out perfectly." Sutton had planned on leaving sooner, but stayed around longer so that Burnet could come back. "I never really imagined myself staying on a show for two years," he revealed. "It's a great place to work because everybody's so young and so up for the job … and you kind of get caught up in it and before you know it, you've been there for two years. Which isn't a bad thing."

It was stated that the characters' reunion would start off with John Paul meeting up with Craig and John Paul not being pleased to see him because of the way "they left it at the airport". Craig comes back for John Paul "and some terrible things happen to John Paul and his life and Craig is there to comfort him".

== Storyline ==
John Paul arrives in town in 2006; he meets Craig while saving him from a beating by bully Sonny Valentine. The two become close friends. With some pressure from Craig, John Paul begins to date schoolmate Hannah Ashworth. John Paul is reluctant to be with Hannah; he knows that he "should" fancy her, but also knows that he does not. Despite this, he ends up having sex with Hannah, both losing their virginity to each other. However, they split up when John Paul reveals that he is harbouring affections for someone else, which is mistakenly believed to be Craig's girlfriend, Sarah Barnes. This sends Hannah on a downward spiral and puts a strain on John Paul and Craig's friendship, but due to the chaos John Paul's revelation causes, he begins to date Hannah again. Soon after, on Hannah's 18th birthday, John Paul breaks up a fight between Craig and Rhys Ashworth when Craig sees Sarah kissing Rhys. John Paul shouts that she is not good enough for Craig, he runs outside in tears and is confronted by Craig. John Paul confesses to Craig that he is in love with him. The following day, Craig is distant towards John Paul, but allows John Paul to explain his feelings. Craig says that he still wants John Paul as a friend, but only as a friend; John Paul says that he will continue to date Hannah and keep up the charade that he is heterosexual. He eventually reveals to everyone else that he is gay. At one point, Craig bullies him. Despite apologizing to John Paul for this, John Paul states that their friendship is over.

In early 2007, John Paul embarks on a relationship with Spike, a DJ whom he met during his sister Jacqui's wedding reception. John Paul and Spike's relationship is the source of much jealousy from Craig, who immediately takes a disliking to Spike and grows furious when John Paul tries to speak about his fears about having sex with Spike. During his exams in May 2007, Craig has trouble concentrating, as all he can think about is John Paul and Spike. He has been struggling to understand his romantic feelings for John Paul while maintaining a romantic relationship with girlfriend Sarah. Storming out of the exam, he goes to John Paul's house. After talking with each other, Craig frustrated and in tears, both reveal their true feelings and sleep together. Afterwards, however, Craig gets out of the bed and shouts homophobic obscenities before storming out. Subsequently, Craig's relationship with Sarah begins to deteriorate, as Craig struggles with his apparent homosexual tendencies. Unwilling to "come out", Craig concludes that he is not gay, stating instead that he only has romantic feelings for John Paul rather than actually being gay or bisexual. Craig negotiates an uneasy few months with Sarah, a situation further exacerbated by Sarah's modelling career, a source of even more jealousy from Craig.

Craig meets up with John Paul under a tree; he insists that he has sorted everything out in his head, he is not gay, and never will be, but this does not mean that he and John Paul cannot have sex from time to time; they can still continue to see each other, and no one will get hurt. John Paul reminds Craig of his love for him, and tells him that he is sick of being used. An unfazed Craig tells John Paul whether he likes it or not, they both know how it is going to end up: he'll knock at John Paul's door, and John Paul will open it.

A few weeks later, two of Sarah's friends from the modelling industry meet with her and Craig for a friendly get-together. Craig acts cold to the friends, particularly the male. The four dine at Il Gnosh and bump into John Paul who stays to chat for a short while before leaving, followed by Craig. Back at John Paul's house, Craig tells John Paul that he cannot stop thinking about him, and although he loves Sarah, he loves John Paul too. Craig then leads John Paul upstairs where they once again sleep together. Later, as Craig lies with John Paul in bed, his mobile phone rings, the caller ID showing that Sarah is calling him. However, Craig ignores it and goes back to sleep in John Paul's arms, leaving John Paul with a smile on his face.

John Paul eventually tells Craig to leave Sarah, and in turn he promises to leave Spike. Whilst John Paul and Spike break up, Craig and Sarah do not, leaving John Paul furious and frustrated. Craig then arranges a last minute get-away for Sarah, without telling John Paul. Angry and upset, John Paul writes a letter to Frankie Osborne saying that he has been sleeping with her son and that he is sorry that she had to hear about it from him. Later, once he has calmed down and realises his mistake, he manages to retrieve it with Spike's help. Despite no longer being a couple, Spike still offers John Paul something more casual, but he quickly realises he no longer has romantic feelings for Spike (despite Craig's betrayal) and tells him it is over for good. When Craig returns from his holiday, and tells John Paul that he still has feelings for him, John Paul snaps back that he has had enough and intends to end it with Craig for good. Despite this, they soon get back together again and the relationship continues in secret.

When Spike finds out about John Paul and Craig's secret relationship, he teases and mocks Craig about it. When Craig confronts him, Sarah overhears and thinks that he is having an affair. In an attempt to convince her that he loves her, Craig proposes marriage to Sarah, asking her to keep their engagement a secret. Throughout their engagement, Craig continues to see John Paul (who knows nothing of the engagement) and gives him a watch that once belonged to his grandfather. Once John Paul learns of Craig and Sarah's engagement, he becomes convinced that Craig will never leave Sarah for him. At an impromptu engagement party thrown by Frankie, John Paul and Craig hide upstairs and begin to be intimate. Secretly, John Paul texts Sarah on Craig's phone and tells her to come upstairs. She leaves the party and walks in on the two of them kissing. Completely in shock, Sarah runs downstairs and outs Craig to the party-goers, leaving John Paul to face the wrath of the Dean family and Mike Barnes. He later tries to apologise to Sarah, who demands to know the details of the affair. After telling her, Sarah says that she can never forgive him. John Paul calls Craig a coward for not accepting his sexuality.

Frankie and Sarah make attempts to reconcile the relationship, but it is no use, as Craig finally announces to his family that he is in love with John Paul. Craig's announcement leads to a show-down style confrontation between the McQueen family and the Dean family (where John Paul's sister says the famed words 'My brother is gayer then yours!), from which John Paul and Craig run away and discuss their feelings for each other. Craig tells John Paul he loves him, but denies being gay with the words "it's not about being gay, it's about who you fall in love with"; this takes place before asking John Paul to come with him to Dublin, an offer which John Paul accepts. As they prepare to leave together, Craig tells his brother Jake that he is not gay, and he only cares for John Paul. John Paul overhears this and expresses concern at Craig's reluctance to come out; this is further exacerbated by Craig not being able to bring himself to kiss or hold John Paul at the airport as they wait for the plane to Dublin. Although John Paul loves Craig, he realizes that he needs more than to be with a man who cannot not display affection towards him in public. Heartbroken, John Paul returns home, leaving Craig to go to Dublin alone. On Christmas Day 2007, John Paul gets a text message from Craig, wishing him a Merry Christmas, asking him to visit Dublin sometime and that he misses him. It is not shown if he texts back.

John Paul moves on with Kieron Hobbs. However, on September 2, 2008, Craig returns. John Paul's romance with Kieron is threatened when Kieron confronts John Paul about any lingering romantic feelings he may have for Craig.

On 5 September, Craig and John Paul end up in bed again and John Paul decides to tell Kieron he is still in love with Craig, but when he finds Kieron, he is dead. John Paul mistakenly believes that Kieron has taken his own life. Consumed with guilt, John Paul rejects Craig. However, they later agree to stay friends. Craig later slips a one-way ticket to Dublin into John Paul's pocket.

On 19 September 2008, John Paul realises that he cannot be without Craig. He rushes to the train station, arriving in time to see a train leaving. He is devastated, until he looks over onto the other platform, where Craig is standing. John Paul runs around it, to him, and rants at Craig. However, after he says that he loves Craig, Craig kisses him in front of everyone on the platform, proving that he does not care what people think. They are later seen on the train, where Craig tells him that when they get to Dublin, he is to tell everyone that he is Craig's cousin Steve. John Paul looks shocked, and Craig jokes that he was only kidding. They are last seen cuddling on the train.

When Craig returns in Hollyoaks Later, he reveals that John Paul has been on a couple of drinking benders as he struggles to cope with the after effects of Niall's actions. He gives a little insight into their life in Dublin – laughing with his sister about their sex life and how John Paul is a superstar DJ. On November 28, 2008, Craig's last appearance on Hollyoaks (Hollyoaks Later), after fighting with Niall for the last time, Craig returns to Dublin and to his boyfriend, John Paul.

John Paul and Craig were last spoken of on 2 November 2010. John Paul's sister Carmel McQueen, talking to their cousin Bart McQueen, said: "Look at our John Paul and his Craig. You know, they went through hell, but they got there eventually. Love always finds a way," confirming that the couple are still happy and together. They were mentioned again in July 2011, showing once again that they are still together and going strong. John Paul returned in December 2012, where he was seen chasing after a bus Craig was on. He later confirms that he and Craig have split up.

In May 2017, after failed relationships with Ste Hay and James Nightingale, John Paul leaves. As John Paul and son Matthew prepared to fly away to Singapore to their new life, his phone rang with Craig's name popping up, hinting a chance of reconciliation between the two.

John Paul returns to the village in November 2019, and reveals that he and Craig had split up again, and that Craig has moved on with a new boyfriend called Hans.

== Reception and impact ==
When Craig kissed John Paul, their subsequent romance became a "massive hit, gaining a cult following amongst fans". The John Paul/Craig/Sarah love triangle was also an aspect of the storyline intriguing viewers. Hollyoaks was named Broadcast of the Year at the 2007 Stonewall Awards, held at London's Victoria and Albert Museum. "The Channel 4 soap was honoured for its sensitive depiction of the gay love affair" between Chester teenagers John-Paul and Craig. Stonewall, an organisation that campaigns for equality for gay men and women, praised the show for its "sympathetic and convincing handling" of the "gritty and emotional" storyline. Hollyoaks producer Bryan Kirkwood stated, "I'm really chuffed that Hollyoaks has been recognised at the Stonewall Awards. It's a really prestigious award and one that means a lot to the show, to James and Guy, to our writers and most importantly the audience that engaged with the story." Sutton added that he was "incredibly humbled" by the award, saying, "Stonewall is such an important organisation and it's amazing that we've been recognised by them for all the hard work we put into the storyline."

Despite the show's plotlines sometimes being over-the-top, the romance between John Paul and Craig remained rooted in believability. Sutton's performance "so resonated with viewers" that he was voted “Most Popular Actor” at the 2008 Digital Spy Soap Awards. In addition, John Paul and Craig's love story was named “Storyline of the Year”. AfterElton.com cited Sutton for being "much of the reason for the storyline's success". They stated that when they did a poll of their readers in 2007 for The 25 Best Gay Characters on Television, John Paul came in at #21. Sutton had not known about the poll, and when told of it stated, "Wow. That's really cool. I don't tend to read too much press and stuff, but I mean I'm aware that we've sold the program to other countries and surfing through the Internet, I'm aware that there are people who really, really watch it. I mean I've heard from the States and there's a couple of people who are in the Far East, actually, who regularly post on forums about me and stuff. And that's just incredible.

John Paul's relationship with Kieron Hobbs created a certain rivalry between the fanbases; the ones wanting John Paul and Kieron together and the ones rooting for John Paul and Craig to end up together. When asked of his choice between the two, Sutton stated, "You're setting me up for a f**king fall now. Some people are going to be upset if I say Craig and some if I say Kieron. Oh, God. I'll have to say Craig, I suppose."

Burnet and Sutton, have had different experiences with the fan reaction to the storyline, but both positive. "I don't get to see the forums much," revealed Burnet, "and I don't read too much [on the Internet] but I do through James – he reads a lot of the online stuff – and he lets me know. It's so moving that so many people actually care about the storyline." Burnet stated his appreciation for the fans making the storyline what it was. "From my understanding," he cited, "DS is a community of fans – without the fans, there is no show so I think the genuine way to move forward is to base a lot of plotlines – obviously if they're realistic – around what fans and communities want. At the end of the day, it's purely based around them. He voiced that "one thing [he's] learned is that there's a lot of politics around television and awards shows – a lot of it is bullshit. But when it comes to the fans, they're genuine. You can't beat the people. It's not a communist society. There's a great power there".

Sutton spoke of his amazement to all the fan reaction. "Very, very surprised. I never prepared myself for that to happen – for such attention to be given to this character and I was a bit overcome by it all, to be honest." He felt that no one warned him what he was in store for: "This just sort of happened. It just really did. Nobody warned me that I would be the focus of so much attention. It's all been a bit mad, to be honest, in a really positive way. But no, no one could have prepared me for the interest that it's gained." Sutton stated that he had spoken to young gay men and had e-mail conversations with people about the storyline and being gay and that it "really" opened his eyes to how difficult it can be and the prejudice out there, even still in Middle England, toward homosexuality.

The Internet has made shows like Hollyoaks more accessible to audiences around the world. When John Paul and Craig first slept together, it was not seen as significantly controversial, though prominent controversy was expected, and was rather seen as "incredibly, incredibly popular". For any series to be on at half past six, which is the time that Hollyoaks broadcasts (in the evening), controversy is typical when it involves two young men going to bed together, but this was not a prominent factor for the John Paul and Craig love story. The actors were not slighted in national press, and it was all "fairly positive" and "a story that needed to be told". Producer Kirkwood relayed: “The Craig and John Paul story is one of the biggest and most successful that Hollyoaks has told, winning many awards and legions of fans."

In 2008, while counting down the top ten shows on the tenth birthday of T4, Hollyoaks was voted second, and the storyline was described as the best in the ten years as T4 showed some clips on it.

In September 2012, Inside Soap named John Paul and Craig's exit as their number 1 happy ending, "This tentative, tremulous, tortured romance is still regarded by Hollyoaks fans as one of the show's greatest-ever storylines - if not the greatest. So fervently were viewers wishing for a happy ending for gay teenager John Paul and his no-I'm-not-gay-but-maybe-I-am friend Craig, the producer even promised a happy ending in advance. And so, as they flew off to Dublin together, they kissed in front of a holiday poster of a sunset. Aw!"

== See also ==
- List of supercouples
