= List of supercouples =

Supercouples are fictional couples who have been titled supercouples by the media, usually with the addition of substantial fan support; they may have been referred to as power couples or dynamic duos, and are often defined by a standard set of criteria or circumstances; these circumstances include mania (significant press and media attention being placed on the couple, having to do with charm rather than negativity), the couple being labeled a supercouple by valid sources, the couple having notably impacted popular culture (such as by mania or by becoming a de facto symbol for its genre), and having been listed as an all-time top romance. Each of these examples have been identified by scholars, critics and press as defining supercouples.

== Soap opera ==
Supercouple	Duration	Show	Source(s)
Joe and Ruth	1970–2013	All My Children	
Cliff and Nina	1979–1989	All My Children	
Greg and Jenny	1981–1984	All My Children	
Jesse and Angie	1982–1988, 2008–2011, 2013	All My Children	
Adam and Brooke	1987–1989, 1991, 2002–2003, 2010–2013	All My Children	
Tad and Dixie	1989–2007, 2011	All My Children	
Dimitri and Erica	1991–2001	All My Children	
Edmund and Maria	1993–1997, 2003–2005	All My Children	
Noah and Julia	1994–1996	All My Children	
Ryan and Gillian	1998–2001	All My Children	
Leo and Greenlee	1999–2002, 2011	All My Children	
Bianca and Maggie	2002–2007	All My Children	
JR and Babe	2003–2008	All My Children	
Zach and Kendall	2005–2011	All My Children	
Steve and Alice	1968–1975	Another World	
Rachel and Mac	1975–1989	Another World	
Cass and Frankie	1989–1996	Another World	
Sam and Amanda	1987–1993	Another World	
Jeff and Penny	1956–1962	As the World Turns	
Bob and Lisa	1960–1964	As the World Turns	
Holden and Lily	1985–2005, 2010	As the World Turns	
Jack and Carly	1997–2010	As the World Turns	
Steve and Betsy	1982–1986	As the World Turns	
Tom and Margo	1981–2010	As the World Turns	
Will and Gwen	2005–2010	As the World Turns	
Luke and Noah	2007–2010	As the World Turns	
Eric and Stephanie	1987–1990, 1999–2005, 2006–2008, 2012	The Bold and the Beautiful	
Ridge and Brooke	1987–2014, 2016–present	The Bold and the Beautiful	
Ridge and Taylor	1990–2002, 2005–2006, 2009, 2011, 2022, 2025	The Bold and the Beautiful	
Finn and Steffy	2020–present	The Bold and the Beautiful	
Ken and Valerie	1961–1971	Coronation Street	
Stan and Hilda	1964–1984	Coronation Street	
Jack and Vera	1979–2008	Coronation Street	
Ken and Deirdre	1981–1992, 1999–2015	Coronation Street	
Bo and Hope	1983–1990, 1994–2015, 2022–present	Days of Our Lives	
Doug and Julie	1970–2024	Days of Our Lives	
Jack and Jennifer	1989–2012, 2019–present	Days of Our Lives	
John and Marlena	1986–present	Days of Our Lives	
Roman and Marlena	1981–1984, 1991–1994	Days of Our Lives	
Shane and Kimberly	1984–1990, 2010–present	Days of Our Lives	
Steve and Kayla	1986–1990, 2006–2009, 2015–present	Days of Our Lives	
Justin and Adrienne	1987–2015, 2017–2019	Days of Our Lives	
Lucas and Sami	1993–1995, 2004–2008, 2012, 2021–2022	Days of Our Lives	
Shawn and Belle	1999–2005, 2007–present	Days of Our Lives	
EJ and Sami	2006–2009, 2010, 2013–2014, 2018–2022	Days of Our Lives	
Will and Sonny	2012–2015, 2017–present	Days of Our Lives	
Chad and Abigail	2011, 2013, 2015–2022	Days of Our Lives	
Ben and Ciara	2018–present	Days of Our Lives	
Daniel and Zara	2009–2023	Doctors	
Adam and Nicole	1970–1975	The Edge of Night	
Kat and Alfie	2003–2012, 2013–2014, 2015–2019	EastEnders	
Ricky and Bianca	1994–2000, 2009–2012	EastEnders	
Robert and Aaron	2014–2019	Emmerdale	
Steve and Audrey	1965–1967, 1976, 1977–1996	General Hospital	
Alan and Monica	1977–1990, 1991–2007	General Hospital	
Edward and Lila	1978–2004	General Hospital	
Luke and Laura	1978–2006, 2008,	General Hospital	
Lee and Gail	1979–2004	General Hospital	
Robert and Holly	1982–1985, 1992, 2014-2018, 2024-present	General Hospital	
Frisco and Felicia	1984–1995, 2013	General Hospital	
Sean and Tiffany	1986–1995, 2008–2021	General Hospital	
Robert and Anna	1991–1992	General Hospital	
Duke and Anna	1986–1990, 2013–2015	General Hospital	
Stone and Robin	1993–1995	General Hospital	
Sonny and Brenda	1993–1995, 1997–1998, 2010–2011	General Hospital	
Jax and Brenda	1996–1998, 2002–2003, 2013	General Hospital	
Lucky and Elizabeth	1997–1999, 2004–2007, 2009–2010, 2024–2025	General Hospital	
Sonny and Carly	1999–2005, 2007, 2014–2022	General Hospital	
Nikolas and Emily	2003–2008	General Hospital	
Jason and Sam	2004–2007, 2009–12, 2017–2020	General Hospital	
Patrick and Robin	2005–present	General Hospital	
Jason and Elizabeth	2007–2008	General Hospital	
Spinelli and Maxie	2008–2010	General Hospital	
Dante and Lulu	2009–2019	General Hospital	
Nathan and Maxie	2013–2018	General Hospital	
Spencer and Trina	2021–2024	General Hospital	
Gus and Harley	2001–2008	Guiding Light	
Josh and Reva	1984–2009	Guiding Light	
Quint and Nola	1981–1985	Guiding Light	
Roger and Holly	1971–1980, 1989–1998	Guiding Light	
John Paul and Craig	2006–2008	Hollyoaks	
Juliet and Peri	2019–present	Hollyoaks	
Brendan and Ste	2010–2013	Hollyoaks	
Brax and Ricky	2013–2016	Home and Away	
Frank and Bobby	1988–1992	Home and Away	
Michael and Pippa	1990–1996	Home and Away	
Kane and Kirsty	2002–2005	Home and Away	
Shane and Angel	1993–1996	Home and Away	
Will and Dani	2000–2001	Home and Away	
Dean and Ziggy	2019–2023	Home and Away	
Alden Richards and Yaya Dub	2015–present	Kalyeserye	
Trisha and Trucker	1990s	Loving	
Karl and Susan	1994–present	Neighbours	
Des and Daphne	1985–1988	Neighbours	
Scott and Charlene	1986–1989, 2022	Neighbours	
Donna and Ringo	2009-2010	Neighbours	
Joe and Viki	1968–1970, 1972–1979	One Life to Live	
Larry and Meredith	1968–1973	One Life to Live	
Jim and Anna	1969–1981	One Life to Live	
Ed and Carla	1973–1979	One Life to Live	
Tim and Jenny	1975–1976	One Life to Live	
Clint and Viki	1982–1994, 2011–2013	One Life to Live	
Cord and Tina	1986–1993, 2011–2012	One Life to Live	
Bo and Nora	1994–2002, 2004–2008, 2009–2013	One Life to Live	
Todd and Blair	1994–1997, 1999–2003, 2011–present	One Life to Live	
Nash and Jessica/Nash and Tess	2005–2008	One Life to Live	
Cole and Starr	2006–2010, 2012	One Life to Live	
Luis and Sheridan	1999–2006	Passions	
Julian and Eve	2003–2008	Passions	
Caleb and Livvie	2001–2002, 2003	Port Charles	
Alison and Rafe	2002–2003	Port Charles	
Kevin and Lucy	1997–2003, 2013	Port Charles	
Eden and Cruz	1984–1991	Santa Barbara	
Mason and Julia	1986–1993	Santa Barbara	
Meg and Ben	1997–1999	Sunset Beach	
Victor and Nikki	1981–present	The Young and the Restless	
Danny and Christine	1990–1994, 2012, 2024–present	The Young and the Restless	
Ryan and Victoria	1992–2001	The Young and the Restless	
Neil and Drucilla	1992–1998, 2002–2007	The Young and the Restless	
Nick and Sharon	1994–2006, 2009–2010, 2013–2014, 2018	The Young and the Restless	
J.T. and Colleen	2001–2009	The Young and the Restless	
Daniel and Lily	2005–2007, 2011	The Young and the Restless	
Nick and Phyllis	2006–2013	The Young and the Restless	
Cane and Lily	2007–2019	The Young and the Restless	
Billy and Victoria	2010–2014, 2016, 2019–2020	The Young and the Restless	
Devon and Hilary	2013–2018	The Young and the Restless	

== Prime time television ==
Some notable supercouples within prime time television:

Supercouple	Duration	Show	Source(s)
Dwayne Wayne and Whitley Gilbert	1989–1993	A Different World	
Bobbi Morse and Lance Hunter	2014–2016	Agents of S.H.I.E.L.D.	
Jemma Simmons and Leo Fitz	2015–2020	Agents of S.H.I.E.L.D.	
Sydney Bristow and Michael Vaughn	2003–2006	Alias	
Julian Sark and Lauren Reed	2003–2004	Alias	
Oliver Queen and Felicity Smoak	2014–2020	Arrow	
Gaius Baltar and Number Six	2003–2009	Battlestar Galactica	
Brenda Walsh and Dylan McKay	1990–1994	Beverly Hills, 90210	
Donna Martin and David Silver	1991–2000	Beverly Hills, 90210	
Brandon Walsh and Kelly Taylor	1994–1998	Beverly Hills, 90210	
Leonard Hofstadter and Penny	2007–2019	The Big Bang Theory	
Sheldon Cooper and Amy Farrah Fowler	2011–2019	The Big Bang Theory	
Seeley Booth and Temperance Brennan	2010–2017	Bones	
Cory Matthews and Topanga Lawrence	1993–2000	Boy Meets World	
Shawn Hunter and Angela Moore	1997–2000	Boy Meets World	
Jake Peralta and Amy Santiago	2014–2021	Brooklyn Nine-Nine	
Buffy Summers and Angel	1997–1999	Buffy the Vampire Slayer	
Buffy Summers and Spike	2001–2003	Buffy the Vampire Slayer	
Richard Castle and Kate Beckett	2009–2016	Castle	
Piper Halliwell and Leo Wyatt	1998–2006	Charmed	
Sam Malone and Diane Chambers	1982–1987, 1993	Cheers	
Chuck Bartowski and Sarah Walker	2007–2012	Chuck	
Bobby Ewing and Pamela Barnes	1978–1987	Dallas (original)	
Joey Potter and Pacey Witter	2000–2003	Dawson's Creek	
J.T. Yorke and Liberty Van Zandt	2004–2007	Degrassi	
Eli Goldsworthy and Clare Edwards	2010–2015	Degrassi	
Fiona Coyne and Imogen Moreno	2011–2013	Degrassi	
Blake Carrington and Krystle Jennings	1981–1991	Dynasty	
Doug Ross and Carol Hathaway	1994–2000	ER	
Ephram Brown and Amy Abbott	2002–2006	Everwood	
Steve Urkel and Laura Winslow	1989–1997	Family Matters	
Barry Allen and Iris West	2014–2023	The Flash	
Sam Braddock and Jules Callaghan	2008–2012	Flashpoint	
Eric Taylor and Tami Taylor	2006–2011	Friday Night Lights	
Ross Geller and Rachel Green	1994–2004	Friends	
Monica Geller and Chandler Bing	1998–2004	Friends	
Jesse Katsopolis and Rebecca Donaldson	1989–1995	Full House	
D.J. Tanner and Steve Hale	1992–1994, 1995	Full House	
Rory Gilmore and Jess Mariano	2002–2004	Gilmore Girls	
Lorelai Gilmore and Luke Danes	2004–2007, 2016	Gilmore Girls	
Finn Hudson and Rachel Berry	2009–2013	Glee	
Will Schuester and Emma Pillsbury	2009–2015	Glee	
Kurt Hummel and Blaine Anderson	2010–2015	Glee	
Brittany Pierce and Santana Lopez	2011–2015	Glee	
Chuck Bass and Blair Waldorf	2007–2012	Gossip Girl	
Meredith Grey and Derek Shepherd	2005–2015	Grey's Anatomy	
Mark Sloan and Lexie Grey	2008–2012	Grey's Anatomy	
Callie Torres and Arizona Robbins	2008–2015	Grey's Anatomy	
Jackson Avery and April Kepner	2012–2022	Grey's Anatomy	
Zoe Hart and Wade Kinsella	2011–2015	Hart of Dixie	
Marshall Eriksen and Lily Aldrin	2005–2014	How I Met Your Mother	
Barney Stinson and Robin Scherbatsky	2008–2014	How I Met Your Mother	
Jane Villanueva and Rafael Solano	2014–2019	Jane The Virgin	
Mack MacKenzie and Karen Fairgate MacKenzie	1982–1993, 1997	Knots Landing	
Gary Ewing and Valene Ewing Gibson Waleska Ewing (Note: The characters first appeared as a couple in 1978 on Dallas, but their relationship was not expanded and explored in depth until Knots Landing began the following year.)	1979–1993, 1997, 2013	Knots Landing	
Ricky and Lucy Ricardo	1951–1957	I Love Lucy	
Sun Kwon and Jin Kwon	2004–2010	Lost	
Bette Porter and Tina Kennard	2004–2009	The L Word	
Daniel Castellano and Mindy Lahiri	2014–2017	The Mindy Project	
David Addison and Maddie Hayes	1985–1989	Moonlighting	
Angela Chase and Jordan Catalano	1994–1995	My So-Called Life	
Tony DiNozzo and Ziva David	2005–2013, 2025	NCIS, NCIS: Tony & Ziva	
Nick Miller and Jessica Day	2012–2018	New Girl	
Schmidt and Cece Parikh	2012–2018	New Girl	
Ryan Atwood and Marissa Cooper	2003–2006	The O.C.	
Seth Cohen and Summer Roberts	2003–2007	The O.C.	
Jim Halpert and Pam Beesly	2005–2013	The Office	
Prince Charming and Snow White	2011–2018	Once Upon a Time	
Emma Swan and Killian Jones	2013–2018	Once Upon a Time	
Lucas Scott and Peyton Sawyer	2003–2009	One Tree Hill	
Nathan Scott and Haley James	2003–2012	One Tree Hill	
Brooke Davis and Julian Baker	2009–2012	One Tree Hill	
Ben Wyatt and Leslie Knope	2011–2015	Parks and Recreation	
Andy Dwyer and April Ludgate	2011–2015	Parks and Recreation	
Aria Montgomery and Ezra Fitz	2010–2017	Pretty Little Liars	
Hanna Marin and Caleb Rivers	2011–2017	Pretty Little Liars	
Spencer Hastings and Toby Cavanaugh	2011–2017	Pretty Little Liars	
Betty Cooper and Jughead Jones	2017–2021	Riverdale	
Veronica Lodge and Archie Andrews	2017–2021	Riverdale	
Zack Morris and Kelly Kapowski	1989–1994	Saved by the Bell	
Usagi Tsukino and Mamoru Chiba	1991–1997, 2014–2018	Sailor Moon, Sailor Moon Crystal	
Haruka Tenouh and Michiru Kaioh	1994–1997, 2016	Sailor Moon, Sailor Moon Crystal	
Olivia Pope and Fitz Grant	2012–2018	Scandal	
Christopher Turk and Carla Espinosa	2001–2009, 2026–present	Scrubs	
Perry Cox and Jordan Sullivan	2001–2010	Scrubs	
Carrie Bradshaw and Mr. Big	1998–2004	Sex and the City	
Magnus Bane and Alec Lightwood	2016–2019	Shadowhunters	
Clark Kent and Lana Lang	2001–2009	Smallville	
Clark Kent and Lois Lane	2009–2011	Smallville	
Eleven and Mike Wheeler	2016–2025	Stranger Things	
Lucas Sinclair and Max Mayfield	2017–2025	Stranger Things	
Jim Hopper and Joyce Byers	2022–2025	Stranger Things	
Eric Forman and Donna Pinciotti	1998–2006	That '70s Show	
Stefan Salvatore and Elena Gilbert	2009–2012	The Vampire Diaries	
Damon Salvatore and Elena Gilbert	2012–2015, 2017	The Vampire Diaries	
Tyler Lockwood and Caroline Forbes	2011–2013	The Vampire Diaries	
Klaus Mikaelson and Caroline Forbes	2012–2013	The Vampire Diaries	
Stefan Salvatore and Caroline Forbes	2014–2017	The Vampire Diaries	
Glenn Rhee and Maggie Greene	2011–2016	The Walking Dead	
Rick Grimes and Michonne	2016–2018	The Walking Dead	
Kevin Arnold and Winnie Cooper	1988–1993	The Wonder Years	
Clarke Griffin and Lexa	2015–2016	The 100	
Jack Pearson and Rebecca Pearson	2016–2022	This Is Us	
Veronica Mars and Logan Echolls	2005–2007, 2014, 2019	Veronica Mars	
Adrianna Tate-Duncan and Navid Shirazi	2008–2013	90210	
Annie Wilson and Liam Court	2010–2013	90210	

== Film ==
Supercouple	Year(s)	Film	Source(s)
Rhett Butler and Scarlett O'Hara	1939	Gone with the Wind	
Rick Blaine and Ilsa Lund	1942	Casablanca	
Nickie Ferrante and Terry McKay	1957	An Affair to Remember	
Tony and Maria	1961	West Side Story	
Clyde Barrow and Bonnie Parker	1967	Bonnie and Clyde	
Han Solo and Princess Leia	1977–2015	Star Wars	
Danny Zuko and Sandy Olsen	1978	Grease	
Nausicaä and Asbel	1984	Nausicaä of the Valley of the Wind	
Pazu and Sheeta	1986	Castle in the Sky	
Westley/the Dread Pirate Roberts and Princess Buttercup	1987	The Princess Bride	
Harry Burns and Sally Albright	1989	When Harry Met Sally...	
Jesse and Céline	1995–2013	Before trilogy	
Dewey Riley and Gale Weathers	1996-2022	Scream	
Jack Dawson and Rose DeWitt Bukater	1997	Titanic	
San and Ashitaka	1997	Princess Mononoke	
Chucky and Tiffany Valentine	1998–	Child's Play	
Chihiro and Haku	2001	Spirited Away	
Aragorn II Elessar and Arwen	2001–2003	Lord of the Rings	
Howl Pendragon and Sophie Hatter	2004	Howl's Moving Castle	
Jack Twist and Ennis Del Mar	2005	Brokeback Mountain	
Troy Bolton and Gabriella Montez	2006–2008	High School Musical	
Peter Parker and Gwen Stacy	2014	The Amazing Spider-Man 2	
Hazel Lancaster and Augustus Waters	2014	The Fault in Our Stars	

== In other media ==
=== Comic book ===
Supercouple	Year of couple creation	Comic book	Source(s)
Superman and Lois Lane	1938	Superman	
Peter Parker and Mary Jane Watson	1966	Spider-Man	
Reed Richards and Susan Storm	1961	Fantastic Four	
Scott Summers and Jean Grey	1963	X-Men	
Rictor and Shatterstar	2009	Marvel Comics Universe	

=== Toys ===
Supercouple	Year of couple creation	Origin	Source(s)
Ken and Barbie	1961	Mattel	
Chuck E. Cheese and Helen Henny	1993	Chuck E. Cheese	
