= Nash Brennan and Jessica Buchanan =

Nash and Jessica
- Forbes March and Bree Williamson as Nash and Jessica
- Duration: 2005–08
- Introduced by: Frank Valentini
In-universe information
- Family: Buchanan; Lord
- Spouse: 2007–08
- Children: Bree Brennan; Chloe Brennan

Nash Brennan and Jessica Buchanan are fictional characters and a supercouple from the American daytime drama One Life to Live. Nash was portrayed by Forbes March, and Jessica is portrayed by Bree Williamson. They were originally paired together while Jessica's alternate personality, Tess, was in control. The Nash and Tess pairing also gained supercouple status.

The couple drew a large fanbase. They were a prominent couple on the series from 2005 to 2008, and were listed as one of fifteen top One Life to Live couples.

== Storyline ==
After months of struggling with dissociative identity disorder (DID), wealthy Llanview heiress Jessica Buchanan has herself committed to a mental institution. She believes that this will help her keep the DID a secret from both her boyfriend Antonio Vega and her mother (fellow DID-sufferer) Viki Davidson. Unfortunately for Jessica, her alternate personality Tess soon takes control and runs away to New York City. There, Tess meets Nash, an aspiring vineyard owner. Mistaking Nash for a wealthy investor, Tess comes on to him; when he turns her down, she retaliates by attempting to steal his car. Later, both attend a party in the Hamptons. When the party's host slips Tess a roofie, Nash steps in and saves Tess, taking her back to his loft to sleep off the effects of the drug. After this incident, the two become more civil to one another. They spend the next few weeks bonding, first as friends, and then as lovers.

Nash buys a vineyard in Napa Valley, California, and invites Tess to move there with him. While in Napa, Tess discovers that she's pregnant. Unsure about whether Nash or Antonio is the father, and insecure about the prospect of motherhood, Tess hides the pregnancy from Nash and plans to have an abortion. Before the procedure takes place, Jessica takes back control and returns to Llanview. Nash follows her there and seeing him causes Tess to re-emerge. Tess finally comes clean to Nash not only about the pregnancy, but about the fact that she is an alternate personality born of Jessica's DID. Nash, though stunned and confused, proclaims his love for Tess and the child that may or may not be his. Jessica's family members also learn about the DID, and plans are made for Jessica and Tess to begin integration therapy in the hopes of melding the two personalities into one.

Nash's past comes back to haunt him in the form of the powerful Reston family. Prior to meeting Tess, Nash had been involved with wealthy and mentally unstable Claudia Reston. Nash informs Tess that he used Claudia for her money, then dumped her afterward. Now Claudia and her father, George, are out for revenge against Nash. Tess tracks down Claudia and tries to convince her to drop the vendetta, but Claudia refuses and indicates that she still has feelings for him. The stress of the encounter causes Jessica to re-emerge for a few days, which she spends bonding with Nash. When Tess regains control, she worries that Nash may have started to fall for Jessica, but Nash assures her that it's not true.

Meanwhile, Viki and Clint uncover Tess's secret: Jessica developed DID because when she was five years old, she was molested by a kiddie porn ring operator, Norman Leeds, who recorded and distributed video tapes of the molestation. When Tess learns about Viki and Clint's discovery of one of the tapes, she is both devastated and humiliated. She and Nash track down Norman (now old, sickly and living in a nursing room) and contemplate killing him; ultimately, they decide that the risk of jail time isn't worth it. Tess and Nash then worry that the discovery of the tape means that Jessica will learn the truth, integration will happen, and Tess will cease to exist.

In late April, Tess starts to go into labor. She is taken to the hospital, and on May 1 she gives birth to a baby girl she names Brennan Buchanan. As Tess, Nash and Antonio wait for the paternity test results, Nash finds that the birth has led to renewed threats from the Restons. Nash decides to leave Llanview in order to protect Tess and Brennan by going after the Restons himself. After Nash leaves, Tess breaks down and voluntarily returns control over to Jessica. Jessica and Antonio reunite just in time to find out the results of the paternity test: Nash is the baby's father. When Nash returns home, he, Jessica and Antonio butt heads over visitation and custody issues. Nash retaliates by kidnapping Jessica and Brennan (who is nicknamed "Bree" by Jessica and Antonio) in the hopes of coaxing Tess out. The plan fails and all three return to Llanview, where Jessica undergoes the final phase of integration therapy. Integration finally takes place, and Jessica emerges the "victor" (with Tess relegated to only a part of Jessica's main personality). Nash, depressed over losing Tess, falls into a brief pattern of destructive behavior that includes drinking, brawling, and a one-night stand with Claudia. Jessica, meanwhile, accepts a marriage proposal from Antonio in spite of her steadily growing feelings for Nash. Nash tries to warn Jessica not to rush into marriage, but she ignores him, and she and Antonio are married on November 9.

Nash lets go of Tess, whom he knew is never coming back, only to fall for Jessica, who is now married to Antonio. A confused Jessica admits sharing his feelings, but refuses to leave her husband. Ultimately, she gives in, and tells Antonio that she was in love with Nash.

Jessica is soon diagnosed with Hepatitis C, presumably a result of Tess' wild lifestyle. It is also determined that as a result Jessica now has a related form of liver cancer and needs a transplant. As the search for a suitable donor begins, Jessica tells Antonio about her feelings for Nash; furious and devastated, he leaves town with Jamie. Antonio turns out to be a match, but not even his mother Carlotta knows where he is. Nash manages to track Antonio down and convince him to return just to save Jessica. An explosion during the surgery forces Nash to help save Antonio's life by closing his open incision. Jessica and Antonio divorce in July 2007, but she collapses in the courthouse as her body rejects the transplanted liver. David Vickers is determined to be a suitable liver donor; he makes a deal with Clint to donate in exchange for $10 million. Fearing that she won't make it, Nash arranges a wedding ceremony in Jessica's hospital room. The two are married before Jessica goes into surgery. Jessica pulls through the surgery and begins a recovery. Nash sets up a faux version of Niagara Falls in Jessica's hospital room to serve as a temporary honeymoon until she is well enough to go on a real one.

Recently released from prison, the mysterious Jared Banks arrives in Llanview in August 2007 with a particular interest in the Buchanan family. He manipulates Natalie into giving him a job at Buchanan Enterprises, swindles Nash at a game of poker and buys Antonio's shares of Nash's vineyard. It revealed that Jared shares a secret past with Tess, who had been responsible for sending him to prison and ruining his chances at a good business job. Jared wants revenge on Jessica, not believing that "Tess" had ever existed. His attraction to Natalie and understanding of Jessica's former mental illness soften him toward Jessica, but his ambition prompts him to step into the role of Asa Buchanan's long-lost son when the opportunity arises. Wanting to keep the identity of the real Buchanan heir — David Vickers — a secret to protect the family, Asa's butler Nigel goes along with Jared's plan.

Suspicious of Jared, Jessica pretends to be Tess to hopefully gain his confidence; he counters by notifying the doctors at St. Ann's, who take Jessica into custody under her own orders established should Tess ever return.

While at St. Ann's, Jessica comes face to face with Allison Perkins, who claims to know a huge secret about Jessica's family. Her interest piqued, Jessica eventually makes a deal with Allison; Jessica will help her escape from St. Ann's in exchange for what she knows. Jessica is released, but she and Natalie smuggle Allison out, planning to return her once they have heard her tale. Once free, Allison manages to elude them, but not before collecting a mysterious package from the Lord family mausoleum where Viki's father is buried. Allison later confronts Jessica with a gun but Jared steps in to save her; Allison lets herself fall from the Palace Hotel balcony, preferring to die with her secret rather than return to St. Ann's. She survives, but is left comatose and in critical condition.

Wanting to get out of business with Jared, Nash hastily agrees to take a deal with shady investors. They are a seemingly too good to be true deal as they give him money to fund projects as needed. However, Nash eventually learns that his deal was too good to be true when the investors declare that the vineyard is not a good investment and they want to tear it down to build a mall.

Jared's lie that he is a Buchanan is exposed by Dorian Lord at a shareholders’ meeting at Buchanan Enterprises. Dorian also exposes that Jared and Natalie have been sleeping together. She declares that all deals made under Jared are null and void. She declares that she owns Buchanan Enterprises. The deal that Jared had made with Nash's investors is voided, resulting in Nash losing the vineyard.

Nash confronts Jared and Natalie on the roof of Buchanan Enterprises. While chastising Natalie's behavior, Nash is pulled by Jared away from her and is thrown over a ledge. Nash crashes through a skylight and falls two stories below.

Nash is rushed to the hospital where every attempt is made to save him. But it is too late as the doctors declare that his injuries are too severe. Jessica's family says goodbye to Nash. Jessica brings Bree into the room to say goodbye to her father. She also tells Nash that she is pregnant with another child. After Bree leaves the room, Jessica and Nash share a tearful goodbye which includes one final kiss. Jessica tells Nash "You are my heart". Nash draws a heart on Jessica's hand with his finger. A few moments later, Nash flatlines with Jessica's head on his heart.

== Recurring theme ==
=== "My Heart" ===
A recurring theme in their romance is the drawing of a heart. When Jessica is sick in the hospital, Nash breathes on the window of her hospital room and draws a heart. "It’s funny because I got a lot of heat from the producers/directors for that," Forbes March said. "It was a spur of the moment decision on my part, but in the end, they kept it in." While on his deathbed, he draws a heart on Jessica's hand, taking her back to that moment in the hospital. Jessica tells Nash that he is more than in her heart, he is her heart, and always will be. After Nash's death, Jessica is stalked by a person who leaves her hearts and she believes the stalker is either Nash or Nash's ghost, it was later revealed that the stalker was none other than Jessica's presumed dead father, Mitch Laurence.

== Reception and impact ==
MSN/TV Guide routinely referred to the couple as a supercouple. The couple generated a loyal fanbase and were quickly labeled a supercouple, frequently being listed as a top supercouple to watch.

Nash's death had a significant impact on viewers. It has been attributed as one of the most touching death scenes in soap opera history. Within the story, the character plunges through a skylight and is killed, the action and plot described as "moving", while Williamson's performance as Jessica as Nash lay dying in the hospital was described as "amazing". Jessica tries to process the difficult truth that her husband is going to die. She goes through denial, anger, and defiance in that moment; Jessica's sheer and total devastation is the most significant emotion conveyed in the scenes. Williamson was praised for having taken "things to a superhuman level". When Jessica goes into the church and prays for Nash's recovery, this allowed viewers to see that she was holding on by a thread, "the hope of divine intervention the only thing tethering her to the ground".

SOAPnet named Tess and Nash one of One Life to Live's top fifteen couples and listed their storyline as one of the show's top forty best.

== See also ==
- List of supercouples
