= Colleen Carlton =

- The Young and the Restless character
- Tammin Sursok as Colleen Carlton
- Portrayed by: Lyndsy Fonseca (2001–2005); Adrianne León (2006–2007); Tammin Sursok (2007–2009); Uncredited (2010); (and child actors)
- Duration: 1992–1995; 2001–2010
- First appearance: March 5, 1992
- Last appearance: December 23, 2010
- Created by: William J. Bell
- Introduced by: Edward J. Scott (1992, 2001); David Shaughnessy and John F. Smith (2004); John F. Smith (2006); Lynn Marie Latham and Josh Griffith (2007)
In-universe information
- Other names: Colleen Cecile Carlton
- Occupation: Student at Genoa City University; Waitress at Crimson Lights; Spokesperson for Jabot Cosmetics
- Father: Brad Carlton
- Mother: Traci Abbott
- Stepfather: Steve Connelly
- Half-sisters: Abby Newman (adoptive)
- Grandfathers: Arthur Kaplan; John Abbott
- Grandmothers: Rebecca Kaplan; Dina Mergeron
- Uncles: Jack Abbott; Billy Abbott; Eric Vanderway
- Aunts: Ashley Abbott; Stephanie Kaplan
- Nephews: Dominic Abbott Newman Winters Chancellor
- First cousins: Keemo Volien Abbott; John Abbott III; Kyle Abbott; Abby Newman; Delia Abbott; Johnny Abbott; Katie Newman; Theo Vanderway; Allie Nguyen (once removed); Harrison Locke (once removed)

Colleen Carlton is a fictional character from The Young and the Restless, an American soap opera on the CBS network, last portrayed by Tammin Sursok. The character was born during the March 5, 1992, episode as the daughter of Brad Carlton (Don Diamont) and Traci Abbott (Beth Maitland). After leaving the soap opera three years later, the character returned as a teenager in 2001, portrayed by Lyndsy Fonseca, who remained in the role until 2005. The following year, the role was recast with Adrianne León, who portrayed the character for a year until Sursok took over. Sursok exited the role in 2009, following the death of the character. In 2010, an uncredited actress reprised the role in a dream.

The character was portrayed as a "sweet Daddy's girl" who rebelled during her teen years. She was also notorious for her romance with J.T. Hellstrom, a relationship considered a soap opera supercouple. Viewers voted them onto top couple lists multiple times. The character's onscreen death in 2009 met with both positive and negative reviews from critics.

== Casting ==
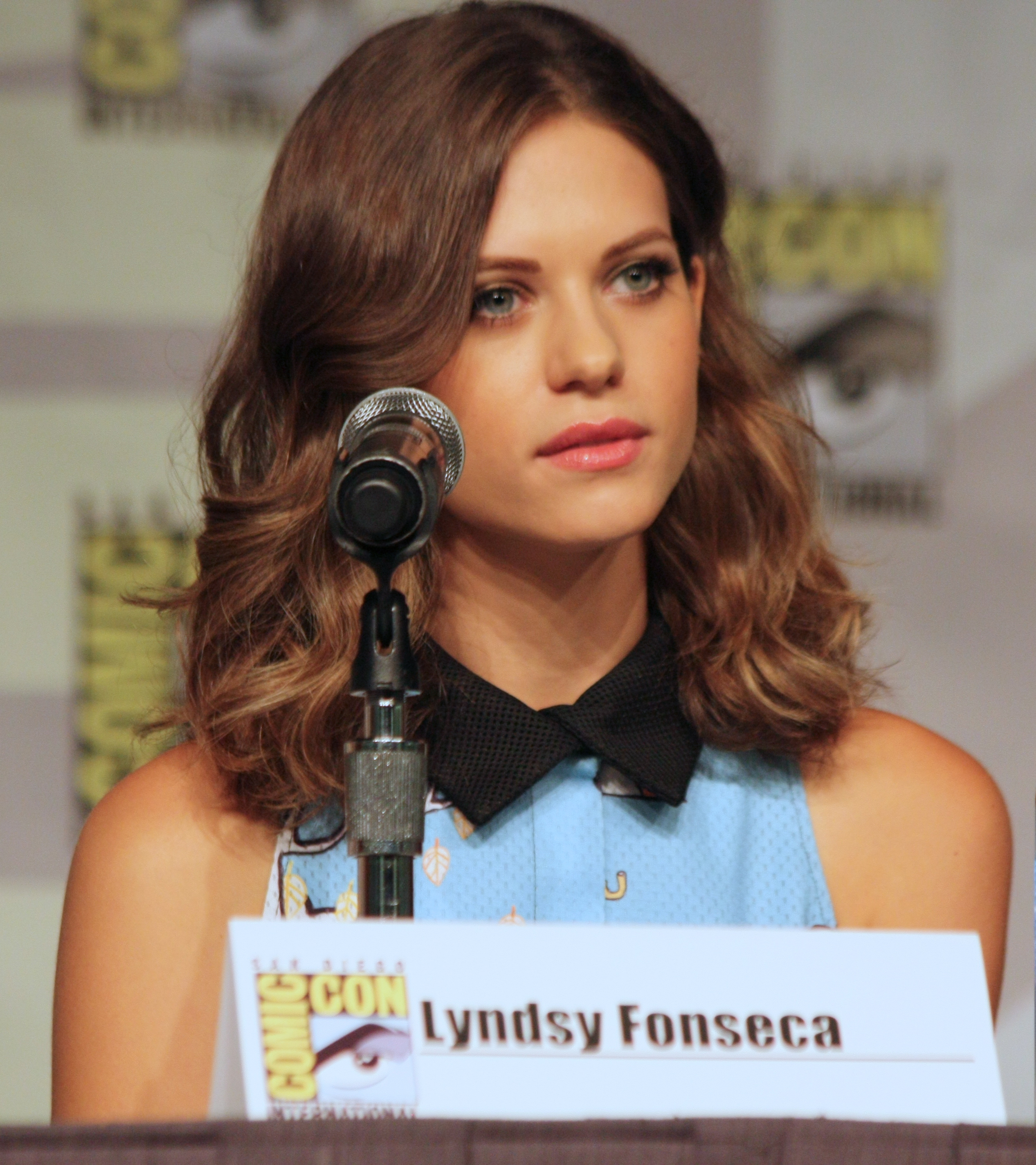
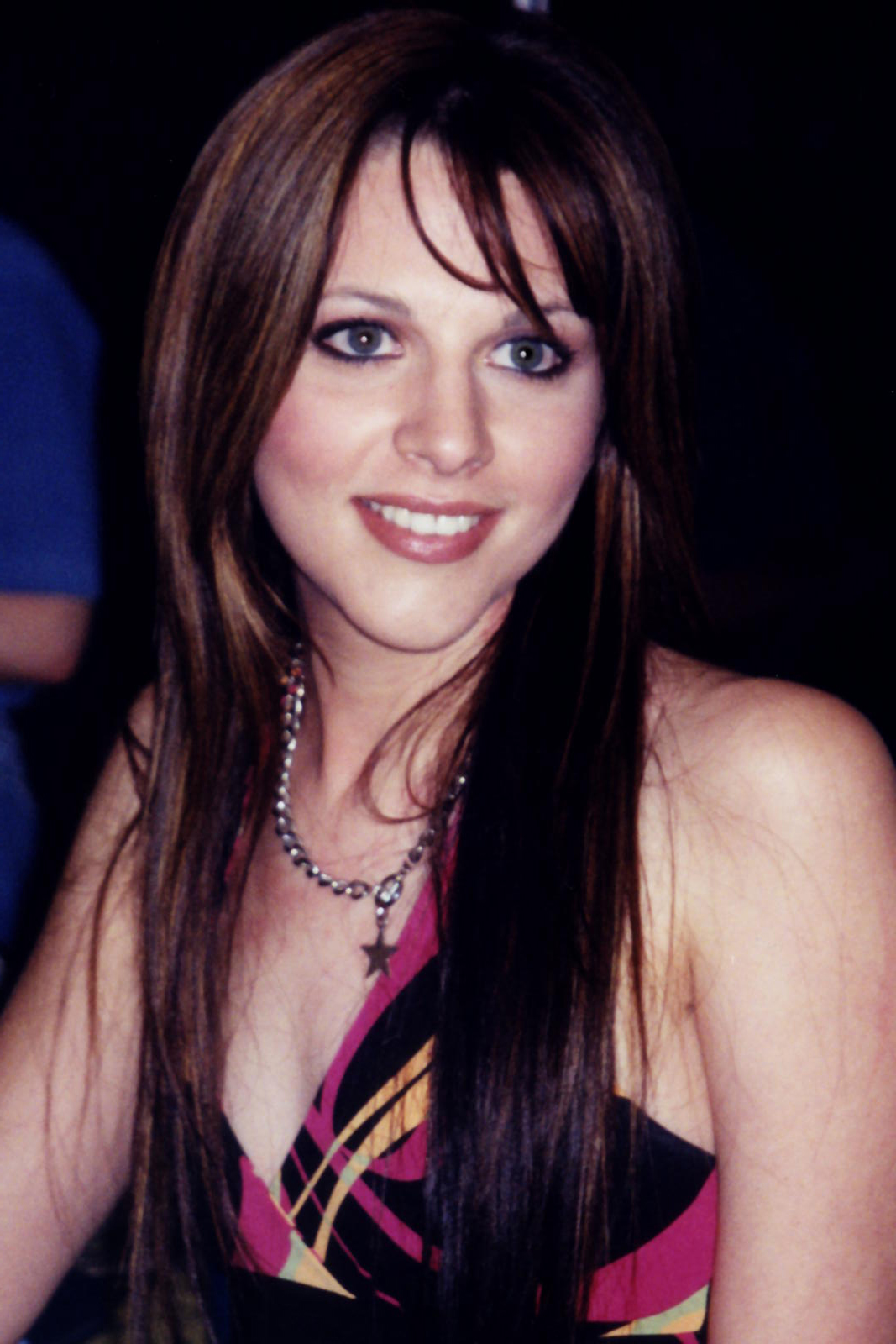
Actresses Lyndsy Fonseca and Adrianne León both portrayed a rapidly aged Colleen.

Colleen was born onscreen in 1992 and, after being portrayed by a string of child actors between then and 1995, the character left Genoa City for New York City with her mother, Traci. Colleen was rapidly aged to fifteen in 2001 when Lyndsy Fonseca assumed the role. In 2004, Fonseca was let go, as Colleen returned to New York to live with her mother. The Young and the Restless executive producer and head writer Jack Smith left the door open for Fonseca to return. "That means a lot to me," Fonseca said. "He's been really cool about that." Fonseca briefly reprised the role from December 2004 to February 2005. In 2005, Melissa Claire Egan screen tested for the role, and in January 2006, the role was recast with Adrianne León. Previously, Leon was recognized for her role as Brook Lynn Ashton on ABC's General Hospital. As her storyline on General Hospital diminished, executive producer Jill Farren Phelps told Leon to commence auditioning for other projects including other soap operas, and was soon cast as Colleen. Fan response to this news was negative, as viewers felt Leon would not fit in the role. Leon wanted to help the viewers with the transition. "Since I was leaving GH one day and airing the next as Colleen, it was a decision on my part to blend in her look with Brook's," she said. General Hospital also planned to write Brook out by scripting her new destination as the Carlton Music Academy in Genoa City. That plan was not followed through.

Leon was released from her contract in June 2007 and the role was recast with Australian actress and musician Tammin Sursok. In an interview with Soap Opera Weekly, Leon said her firing shocked her. "When I got the call, I asked when my last day was, and it had already passed," she said. "There was already a replacement. The whole thing was done and sealed." When she published the news on her Myspace page, she received a "flood of fan support." Rumors went around that Leon was fired because of her fluctuating weight. Leon said the extra weight she gained was a result of medication and a storyline that was never explored. She gained weight from the steroids she was taking for an allergic reaction to the wool she had to wear as part of Colleen's winter wardrobe. She was later asked to keep the weight on by Lynn Marie Latham, the Young and the Restless head writer. "Lynn contacted me about doing a weight storyline with Colleen," Leon said. "She wanted to put out the message that people come in all sizes- she wanted to put some balance out there. I agreed that was the right message and I loved that she asked me." So she kept the added weight on for authenticity. Whether her firing had to do with the weight gain, Leon said she did not know.

Sursok, who gained a following portraying Dani Sutherland on the Australian soap opera Home and Away in the early 2000s, met rejection from a number of The Young and the Restless viewers. Despite negativity she also received positive viewer feedback. "The fans have been really great," she said. In preparation for the role, Sursok tried to catch up on Colleen's history. "I watched the last six months of episodes," she said. After two years in the role, the actress departed and the writers killed off Colleen. In an interview with Soap Opera Digest in October 2009, Sursok said it was difficult to pursue outside projects and appear on The Young and the Restless as well. Her departure was a mutual decision by her and the show. "I was satisfied with the way that my character was written out," she said. "I think a little bit of drama is always fun, and I had a memorable ending that created some good storyline for so many other people. I'm glad I got to be a part of that." On December 23, 2010, an uncredited actress portrayed the role in a dream sequence of Victor Newman.

== Development ==
=== Characterization ===
Colleen was characterized as a "sweet Daddy's girl." Leon wanted to make the character more grown up. "She's still the same person, but she's 20 now and she's had a year of college," she said. "She's been in New York for a year, and New York itself can change a person. I wanted to bring that fresh element to that character." Leon said Colleen fans came over to her message board after she got the role and tried to fill her in on the details of the part so she would not "screw things up." Though she looked over the information, Leon said, "I didn't want to go into detail, because I did want to come in and have a fresh start with the character. Coming in as a recast was stressful already, so trying to mimic what she did…. I got this [role] for a reason — something I did — so I didn't want to lose that element. Plus, the character's grown up." Sursok hoped to bring something new to the role while keeping with the familiar. "It's very hard to come in and have a background already in place for a character," she said. "You want to remember who the character was from the beginning, but I'd like to change it up a bit. People evolve; characters evolve. I think Colleen is torn between two worlds right now. Her father treats her like a child, but she's trying to grow up." An element Sursok wanted to add to the character was drama. "Everyone wants to play what they don't have and my life's very settled at the moment," she said. "It would be nice to spice things up, maybe have an affair with someone."

=== Relationship with J.T. Hellstrom ===
The original storyline designed for J.T. and Colleen centered around an unrequited crush she feels for him. Luckinbill and Fonseca, the first actress to portray Colleen, thought their character's relationship would progress no further than friendship. Fonseca said that if they became a couple, the fun brought on by the "tug-and-pull" element between them could disappear. Luckinbill considered the age difference too great an obstacle to overcome, as at the time, J.T. was 18 years old and Colleen was 15. Smith later pushed for the plot to be taken further and the characters were paired romantically. Both soap opera critics and members of the show's cast and crew considered this a controversial and surprising move. Fonseca stated she "wasn't expecting it at all", and admitted that even former executive producer David Shaughnessy found the pairing "shocking".

The writers used J.T.'s relationship with Colleen to bring out a more sympathetic side to him that the audience up to that point never witnessed before. Smith characterized their storyline as "taking this guy on the journey from wild college kid to being in love with this little high school sophomore". They also positioned Colleen as the aggressor in the relationship by scripting her as pursuing J.T., while he, in an uncharacteristic move, held off because of the difference in their ages. The writers "carefully navigated the development of this relationship, emphasizing its tender, supportive aspects." They scripted them as "ferociously protective" of each other.

=== Death ===
For the scenes leading up to Colleen's death, The Young and the Restless went on location to Franklin Canyon, California. The inside of the lake that Colleen drowns in was recreated in the CBS Studios. The Bold and the Beautiful's head writer and executive producer Bradley Bell allowed Don Diamont to return to The Young and the Restless as Colleen's deceased father, Brad, as one of the visions Colleen has while unconscious. Diamont currently portrays The Bold and the Beautiful's Bill Spencer, Jr. "In order to accommodate contract constraints and actors' availability, we were writing scenes that were shot the following week, which is very unusual," said The Young and the Restless's co-headwriter Scott Hamner. "The appearance of Don gave a depth of feeling to the show that would not have been possible without him." During the taping of Colleen's final scenes, Sursok was not there. "They had to use insert shots of me [which were filmed beforehand] for when she was shown in bed at the hospital," she said.

== Storylines ==
=== 2001–07 ===
After returning to town with her mother, Colleen became friends with local girls Lily Winters and Sierra Hoffman, and begins a romance with J.T. Hellstrom. At first, Colleen's family was wary of J.T. as he had a bad track record with women, but they eventually accepted the relationship. Sex became a stumbling block for the couple. Colleen made sexual overtures to J.T. and he turned her down because of their age difference. Not long afterward, he gave in to the advances of an older woman, Anita Hodges. When Colleen found out, she was devastated and the two broke up, though however they reconciled soon after.

When Lily began dating Kevin Fisher, Colleen told Lily's parents Drucilla and Neil Winters after the relationship turned sexual. In retaliation, Kevin trapped Colleen in Gina Roma's restaurant and started a fire. Colleen survived after J.T. went into the building and carried her out. She remained distrustful of Kevin, who covered up his crimes. Colleen left Genoa City for New York because she felt she was getting in the way of J.T.'s music career. She later returned expecting to reunite with him, but he had moved on with Mackenzie Browning. She was also shocked to learn that Kevin had been accepted by most of the community, Lily included.

After Mac left town, Colleen and J.T. reconciled. She was rocked by the revelation that her father had assumed the name of Brad Carlton, and was in fact the son of Holocaust survivor and art historian Rebecca Kaplan. The majority of the Kaplan family had been killed because Rebecca had made it her life's work to return artwork stolen by the Nazis.

Following her grandmother's lead, Colleen began to study art history in college under a professor named Adrian Korbel, and it became apparent to both that they had more than a student/teacher relationship, much to the chagrin of the Kaplans, who were still in hiding, and her boyfriend J.T. Colleen used Professor Korbel's knowledge to help solve the mystery of the Grudgeon Reliquary, the artifact that lead to the Kaplan family's murder. Despite her family's objections and a growing possibility that Korbel is involved in the murder of Newman Enterprises executive Carmen Mesta, Colleen cheated on J.T. with Adrian on Valentine's Day.

Colleen and Kevin were then kidnapped by Jana Hawkes as part of her scheme involving the reliquary mystery. She attempted to kill them both and frame Kevin for the crimes she committed by setting the building on fire. As both Colleen and Kevin were succumbing to the smoke, J.T. and Korbel managed to save them. After Colleen recovered, she cleared Kevin's name, and afterward the two forgave each other and became friends.

After breaking up with J.T., Colleen tried to start a relationship with Korbel, but her family and J.T. threw up roadblocks. After Adrian nearly lost his job, they attempted to feign a break-up and continued to see each other, but Sharon Newman discovers them and told Brad. As a result, Brad cut his daughter off financially, though Colleen soon overcame this obstacle with a loan from her uncle Jack Abbott.

=== 2007–09 ===
Colleen, furious with Brad, gave Korbel permission to use her family's story in his new book, Saved From the Ashes. They broke up after she changed her mind about the book and Brad stopped the publication. Korbel moved on with Amber Moore while Colleen began a relationship with Daniel Romalotti. Their relationship ended soon after when Daniel reunited with Amber.

After Brad died saving Sharon's son Noah Newman from drowning in a frozen pond, Colleen resolved to honor her father's memory by stepping into his seat on the Newman Enterprises board of directors. She angrily lashed out at the company's founder and CEO, Victor Newman, Brad's long-time rival, as she believed he is partly to blame for her father's death. Victor paid Jeffrey and Gloria Bardwell to catch Colleen in a compromising situation so she could be kicked off the board. They succeeded by paying a bartender to get her drunk and tape her flashing her breasts in public.

Victor's vendetta against Colleen brought her closer to J.T., who at the time was married to Victoria Newman. They kissed before she is kidnapped and held hostage by Jack's mentally unstable ex-wife, Patty Williams. She later escaped by canoe on the nearby lake, but fell in and nearly drowned. Jack took her to the hospital, and she was declared brain dead. Traci made the decision to remove her daughter from life support and donated Colleen's heart to Victor. At Colleen's memorial service, her family gathered to remember the good times and say their goodbyes to her. They let red balloons float away in the air to as a way of saying goodbye to Colleen. One year later, Colleen made an appearance in a dream had by Victor. He realized it was her at the end when he knew he was doing wrong by her.

== Reception ==
Colleen became popular when paired with J.T. The couple was listed as the fourth most romantic couple of 2003 in Soap Opera Update: The Year in Soaps. After Fonseca was let go from the role, she was voted fourth "most missed actor" of 2004 in that year's issue of Soap Opera Update The Year in Soaps. When the role was recast with Leon, the couple was listed as the favorite The Young and the Restless couple in Soap Opera Digest and the couple's portrayers, Leon and Thad Luckinbill, were listed as the series' favorite actress and actor.

When Colleen was killed off in 2009, the storyline received both positive and negative feedback from critics. Soaps In Depth referred to the scenes while Colleen sank under the water, while her family worried about her whereabouts an "instant classic." Soap Opera Weekly's Mala Bhattacharjee said the dream sequences that Colleen had while drowning were ludicrous. Janet Di Lauro, from Soap Opera Weekly, criticized the plot twist and said the "mere thought of the Abbott family donating Colleen's heart to Victor is enough to melt the brain of even the most casual fan." Di Lauro considered the performances of Christel Khalil (Lily), Peter Bergman (Jack) and Beth Maitland (Traci) as the only positive element of the story. She said the scenes where Lily said goodbye to Colleen "was one of the most touching scenes to air during Colleen's last days. It was uplifting to see the ailing Lily keep her composure and promise Colleen she would live her life for the both of them." Soap Opera Digest named the story Editors' Choice for the week, praising it as a "chilling, rich and game-changing coda to this wrenching family tragedy" and a "fitting tribute to the lost Colleen."

== See also ==
- J.T. and Colleen
- Colleen Carlton @ soapcentral.com
