= Adrianne León =

American musician and actress (born 1987)

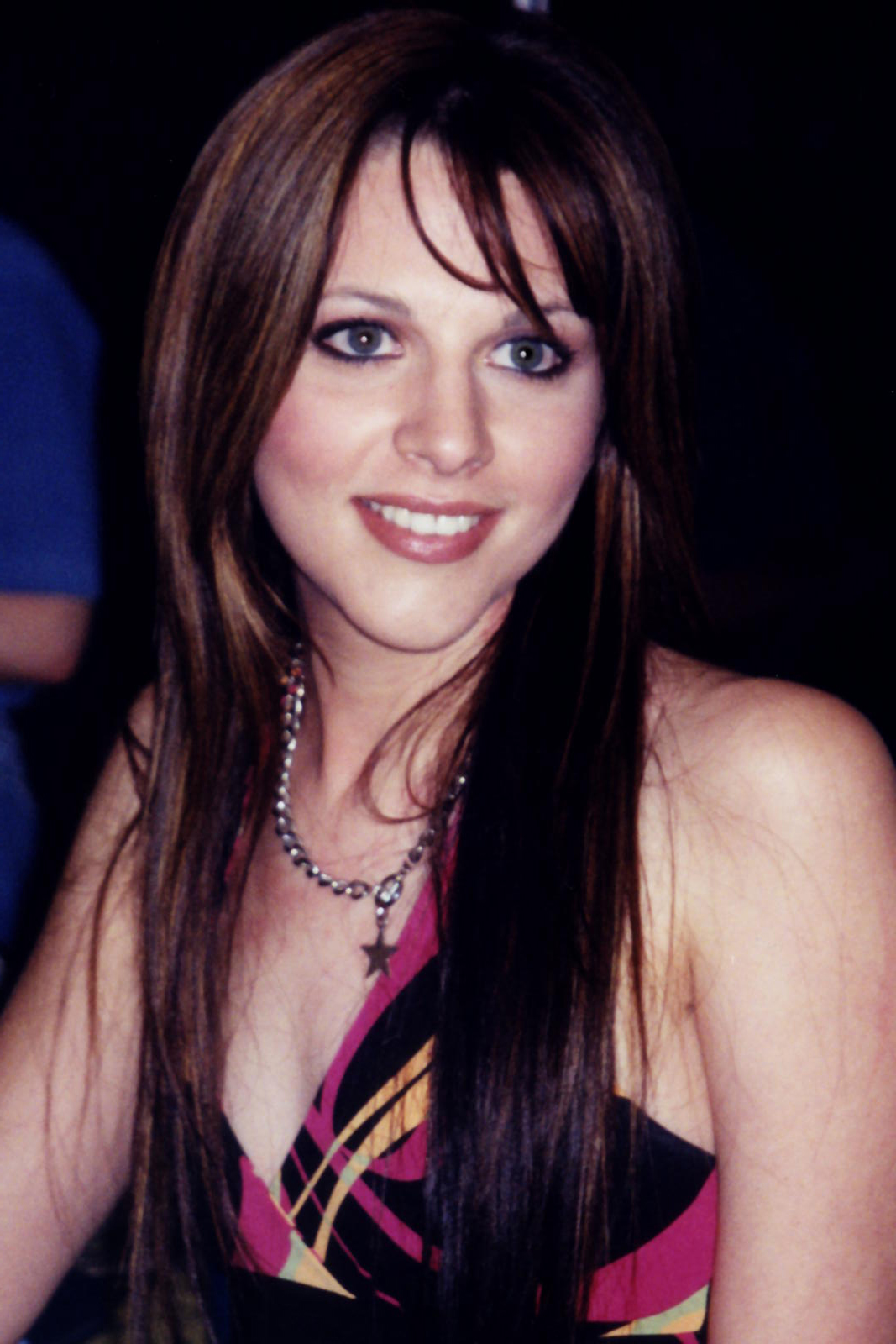
- León in 2007
- Born: Adrianne Therese León; March 15, 1987 (age 39)
- Occupations: Singer-songwriter; actress
- Years active: 2004–2011
- Musical career
- Origin: San Diego, California, US
- Genre: Rock
- Instruments: Vocals; guitar
- Years active: 2002–present
- Member of: Caught Crimson

Adrianne Therese León (born March 15, 1987) is an American singer-songwriter and actress. She is the co-founder and lead vocalist of the rock band Caught Crimson. León began her career writing songs for the soap opera General Hospital and went on to have a role as the punk rock teen Brook Lynn Ashton, which earned her a Daytime Emmy nomination and a Soap Opera Digest Award. She left the show for the CBS soap opera The Young and the Restless, where she took over the role of Colleen Carlton.

== Biography ==
=== Early life ===
Adrianne León was born in San Diego, California; she is of Ecuadorian and Puerto Rican descent and lived in Ecuador as a child. After moving to the US, León began modeling and performing. After completing the seventh grade, she was homeschooled by her mother and then rapidly advanced through high school. She is a member of the ASCAP and AFTRA.

=== Career ===
León voiced over a Glamma Jammas commercial and was also in a public service announcement for Vons, a supermarket chain.

León was hired in 2002 to write songs alongside Rick Krizman for the soap opera General Hospital. In 2003, she performed two songs for the documentary Hollywood's Magical Island: Catalina: "Everlasting Dream" and "She Heals You". She formed Caught Crimson with the help of Murray Yates, lead vocalist of the Canadian rock band Forty Foot Echo. León later recruited former Artension bassist Kevin Chown, former Alien Ant Farm guitarist Terry Corso, and former Forty Foot Echo drummer Rob Kurzretier. She provided vocals for a Glamma Jammas commercial song titled "Don't Get Me Started", written and produced by Kendall Marsh. She also sang "Favor Me" and "Falling In", both written and produced by Jody Whitesides. On October 4, 2003, Adrianne León performed at the California Avocado Festival and on August 23, 2003, she played at the Aloha Festival, where she opened for Dishwalla. Both festivals were held in Carpinteria, California.

In May 2004, León was cast as the feisty and rebellious teen Brook Lynn Ashton in the soap opera General Hospital. She portrayed the character as a talented punk rock singer and songwriter who constantly fights against her mother Lois Cerullo's pressure to become a rock star. Léon was named "Outstanding Performer of the Week" of September 13, 2004, by Soap Opera Weekly for her performance. The role earned her a Soap Opera Digest Award for "Outstanding Female Newcomer" as well as a Daytime Emmy Award nomination for "Outstanding Younger Actress in a Drama Series" later in 2005.

She also guest-starred on the ABC prime-time sitcom Hot Properties as the young music VJ Courtney alongside Harry Hamlin, as his much younger fiancée. In early 2006, León took over the role of Colleen Carlton on The Young and the Restless.

She returned as the character Brook Lynn Ashton in General Hospital on May 21, 2010. She was on the show until April 2011, when the character was written off. León told Soap Opera Digest in August 2019 that she would love to return to General Hospital to reprise the role someday. In November 2019, Amanda Setton debuted in the role of Brook Lynn.

== Filmography ==
Television roles
Year	Title	Role	Notes
2004–2006, 2010–2011	General Hospital	Brook Lynn Ashton	Contract role
2005	I Wanna Be a Soap Star	Herself	1 episode
2005	Hot Properties	Courtney	1 episode
2006–2007	The Young and the Restless	Colleen Carlton	Contract role

== Awards and nominations ==
Year	Award	Category	Work	Result	Refs
2005	Daytime Emmy Award	Outstanding Younger Actress in a Drama Series	General Hospital	Nominated	
2005	Soap Opera Digest Award	Outstanding Female Newcomer	General Hospital	Won	
