= Golden Globe Award for Best Actor in a Motion Picture – Musical or Comedy =

Golden Globe Award

Golden Globe for Best Actor in a Motion Picture – Musical or Comedy
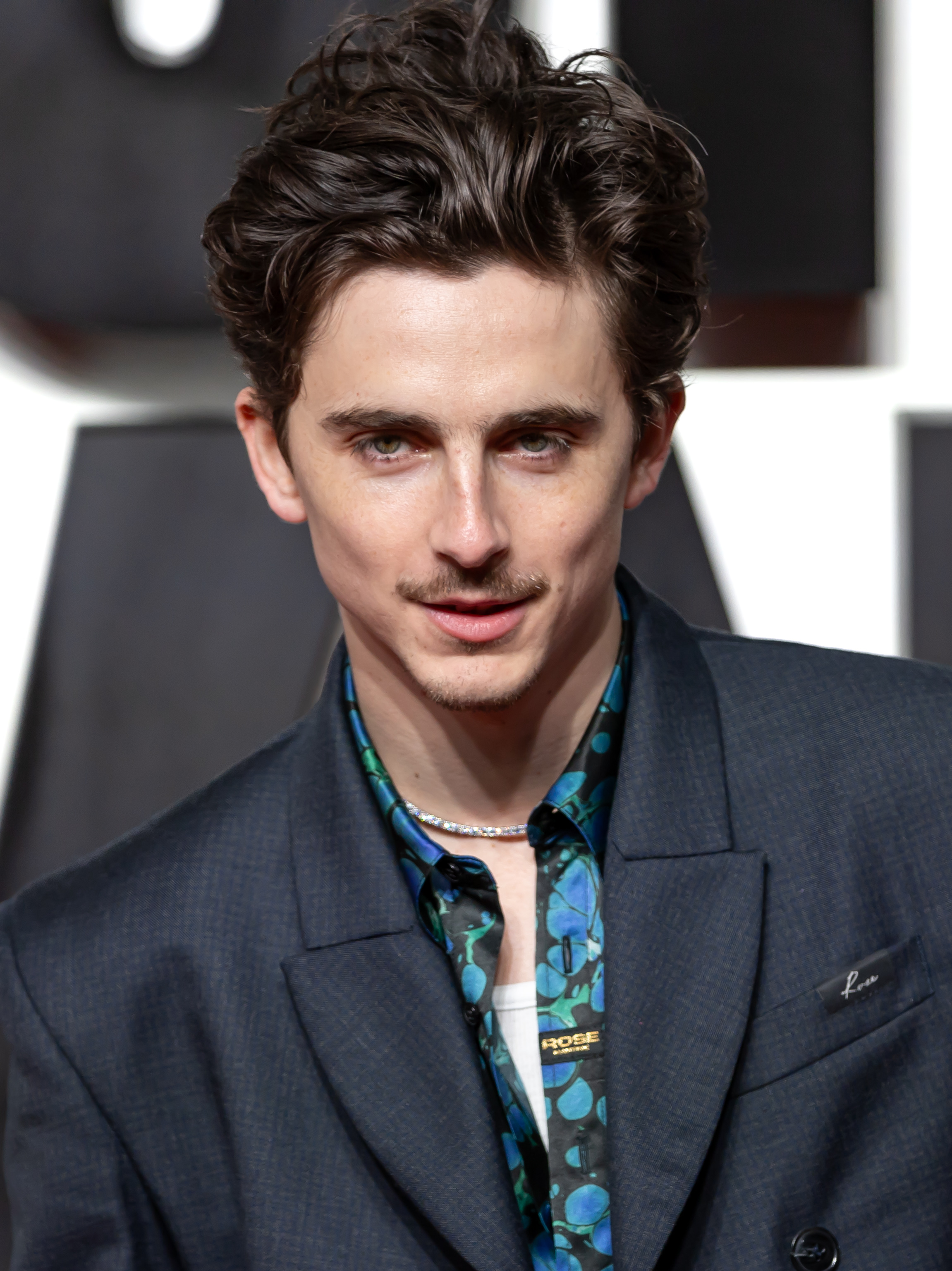
- The 2025 recipient: Timothée Chalamet
- Awarded for: Best Performance by a Leading Actor in a Musical or Comedy
- Location: United States
- Presented by: Dick Clark Productions
- First award: 1951 (for performance in films released during the 1950 film season)
- Currently held by: Timothée Chalamet for Marty Supreme 2025
- Website: goldenglobes.com

The Golden Globe Award for Best Actor in a Motion Picture – Musical or Comedy is a Golden Globe Award first presented by the Hollywood Foreign Press Association. It is given in honor of an actor who has delivered an outstanding performance in a leading role in a musical or comedy film. Previously, there was a single award for "Best Actor in a Motion Picture", but the creation of the category in 1951 allowed for recognition of it and the Best Actor – Drama.

The formal title has varied since its inception. In 2006, it was officially called: "Best Performance by an Actor in a Motion Picture – Musical or Comedy". As of 2013, the wording is "Best Actor in a Motion Picture – Musical or Comedy".

== Winners and nominees ==
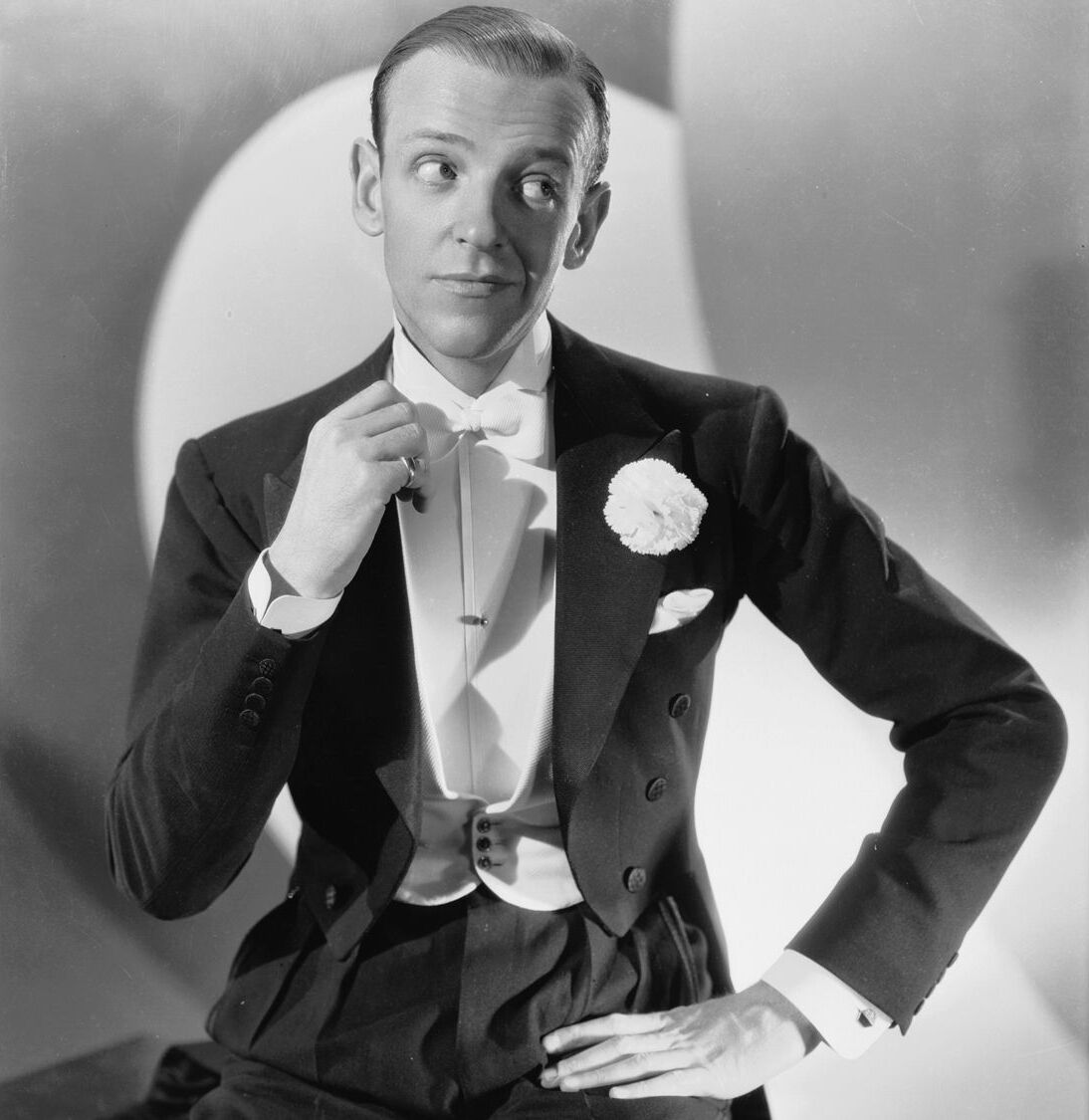
Fred Astaire is the first recipient of this award for Three Little Words (1950)

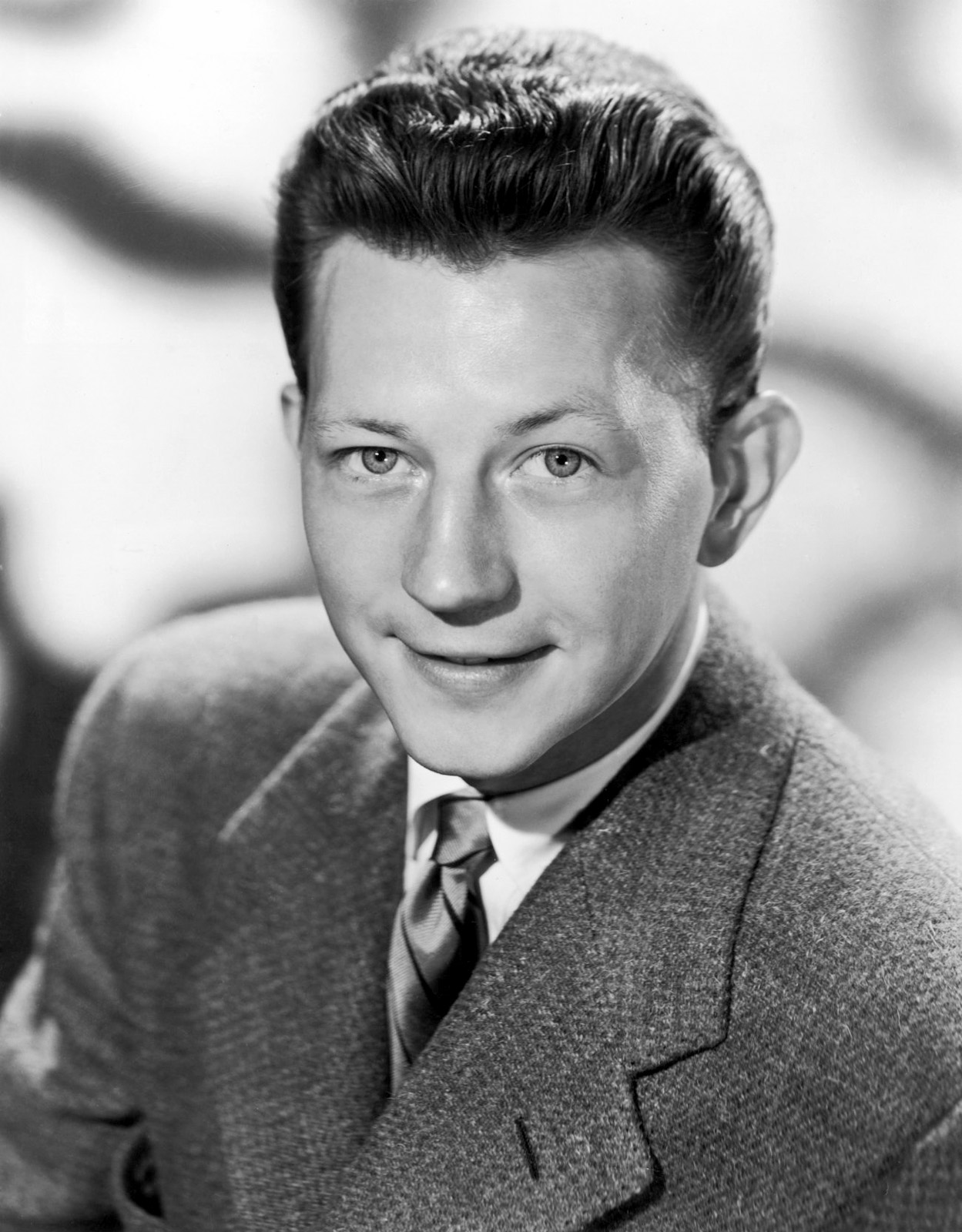
Donald O'Connor won for Singin' in the Rain (1952)

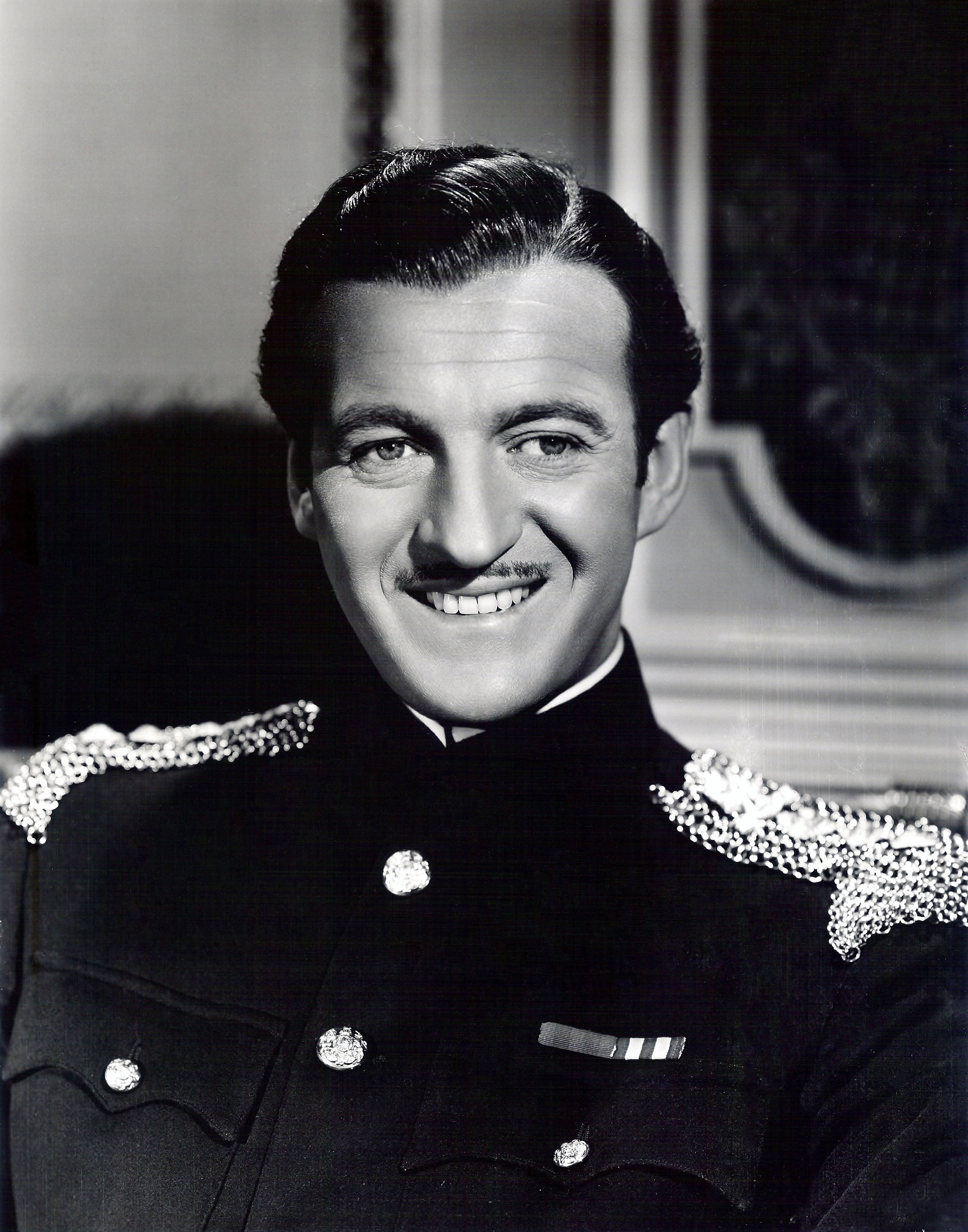
David Niven won for The Moon Is Blue (1953)

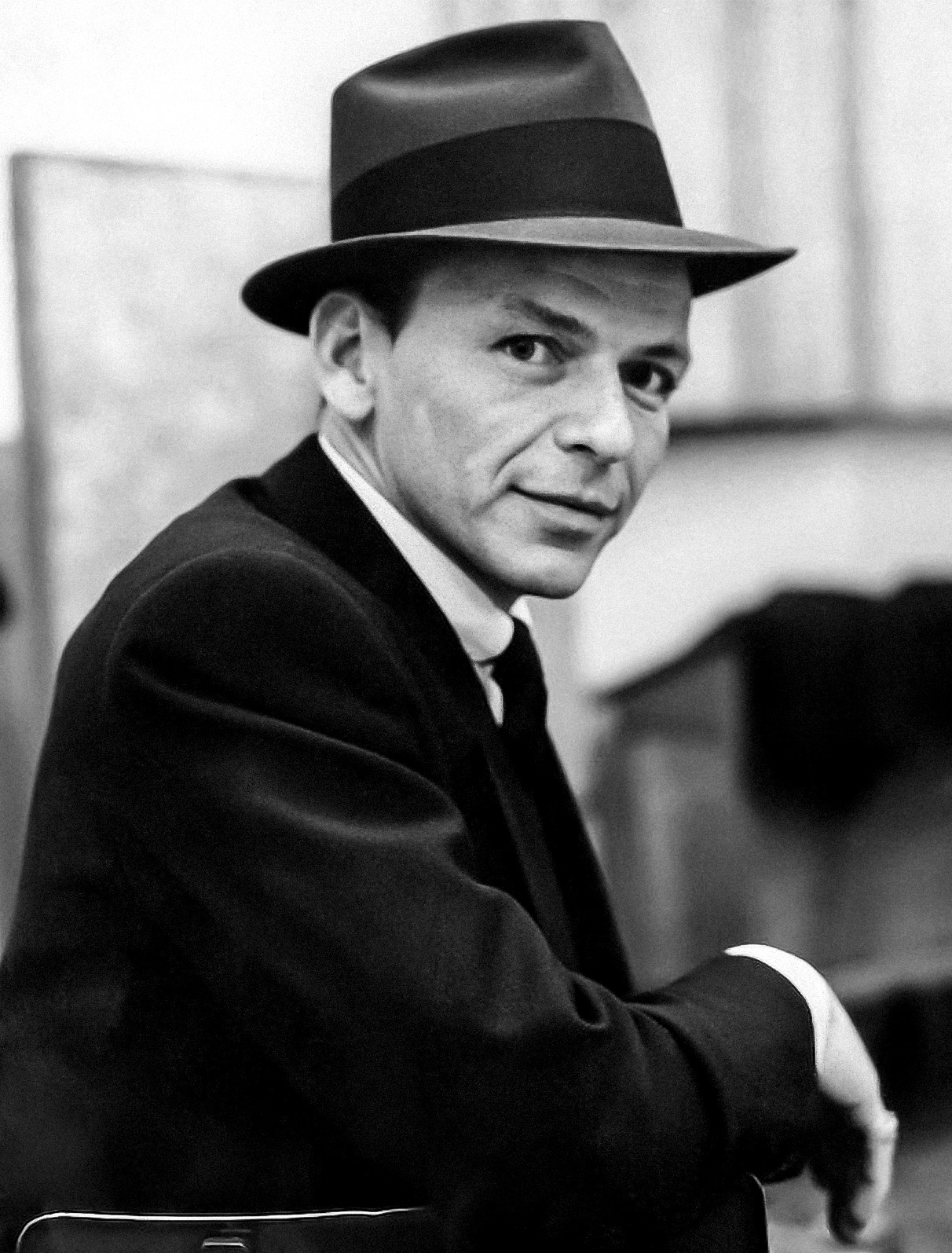
Frank Sinatra won for Pal Joey (1957)

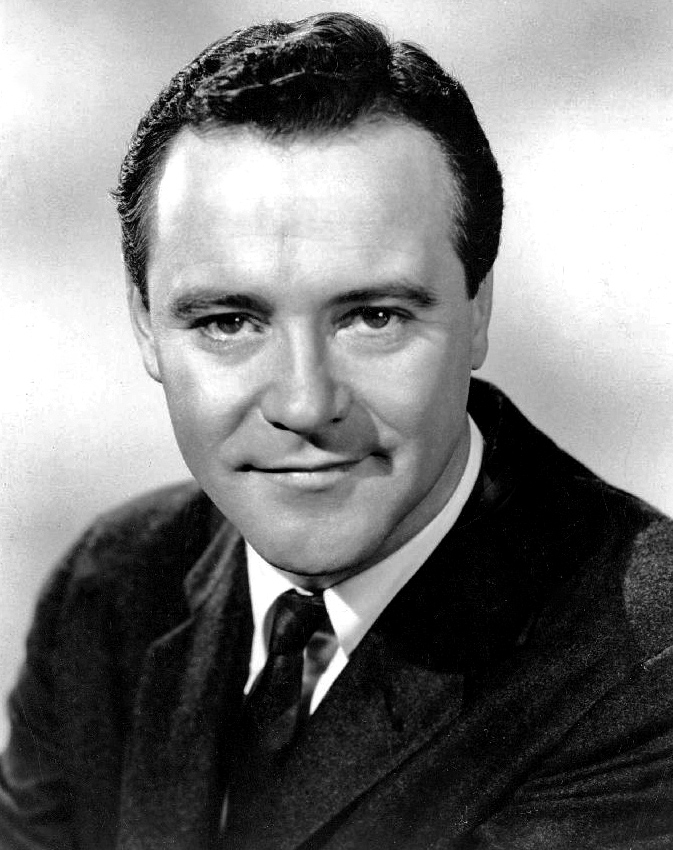
Jack Lemmon won thrice for Some Like It Hot (1959), The Apartment (1960), and Avanti! (1972)

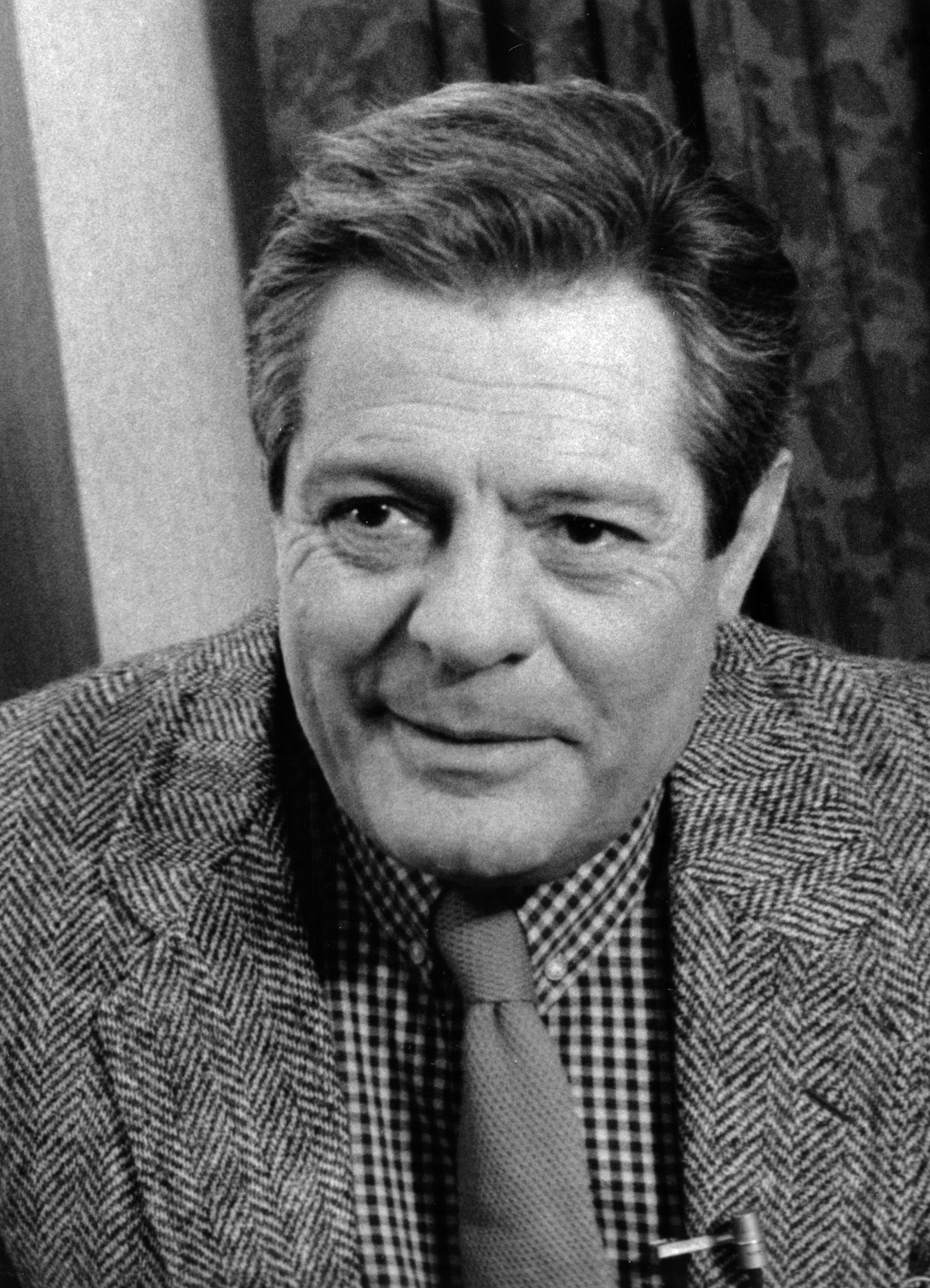
Marcello Mastroianni won for Divorce Italian Style (1962)

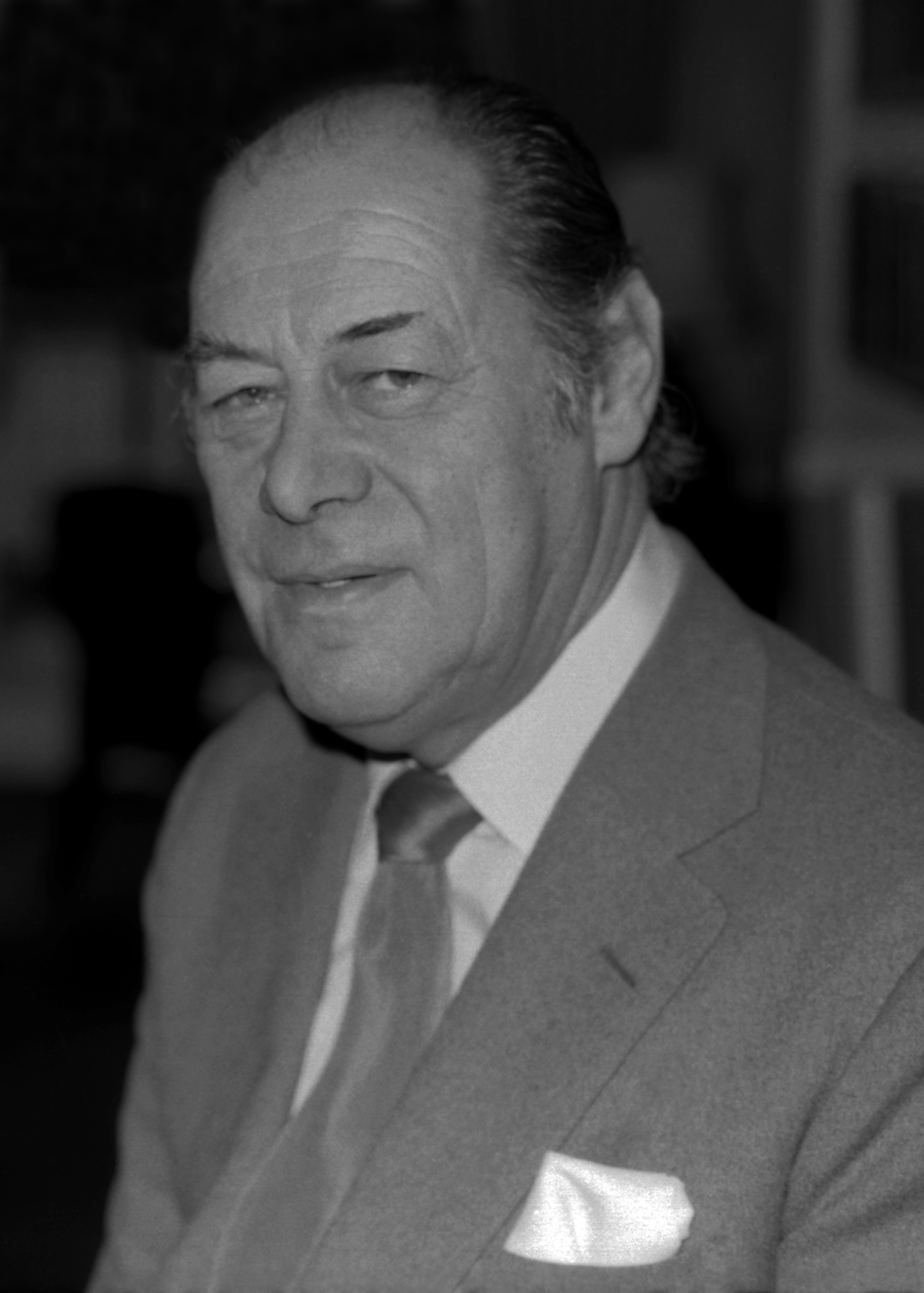
Rex Harrison won for My Fair Lady (1964)

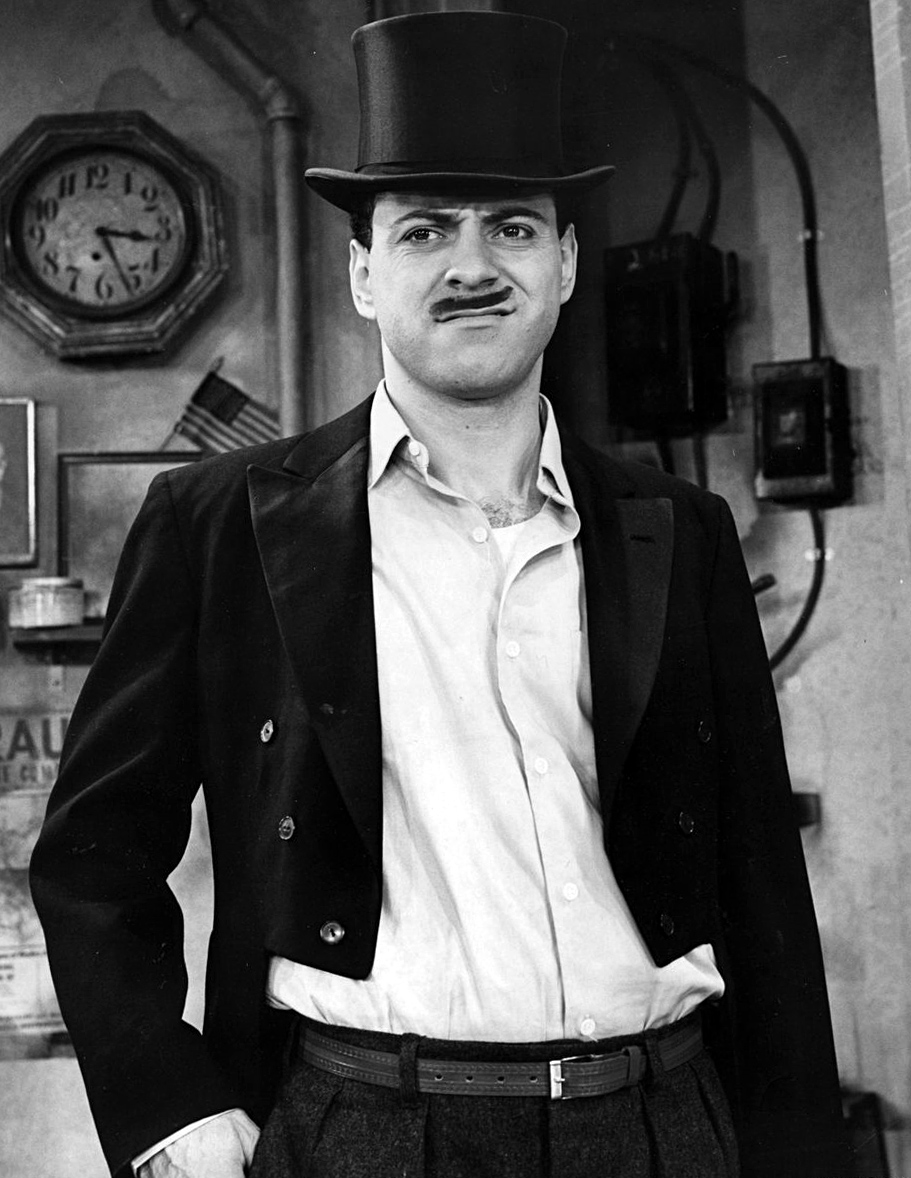
Alan Arkin won for The Russians Are Coming the Russians Are Coming (1966)

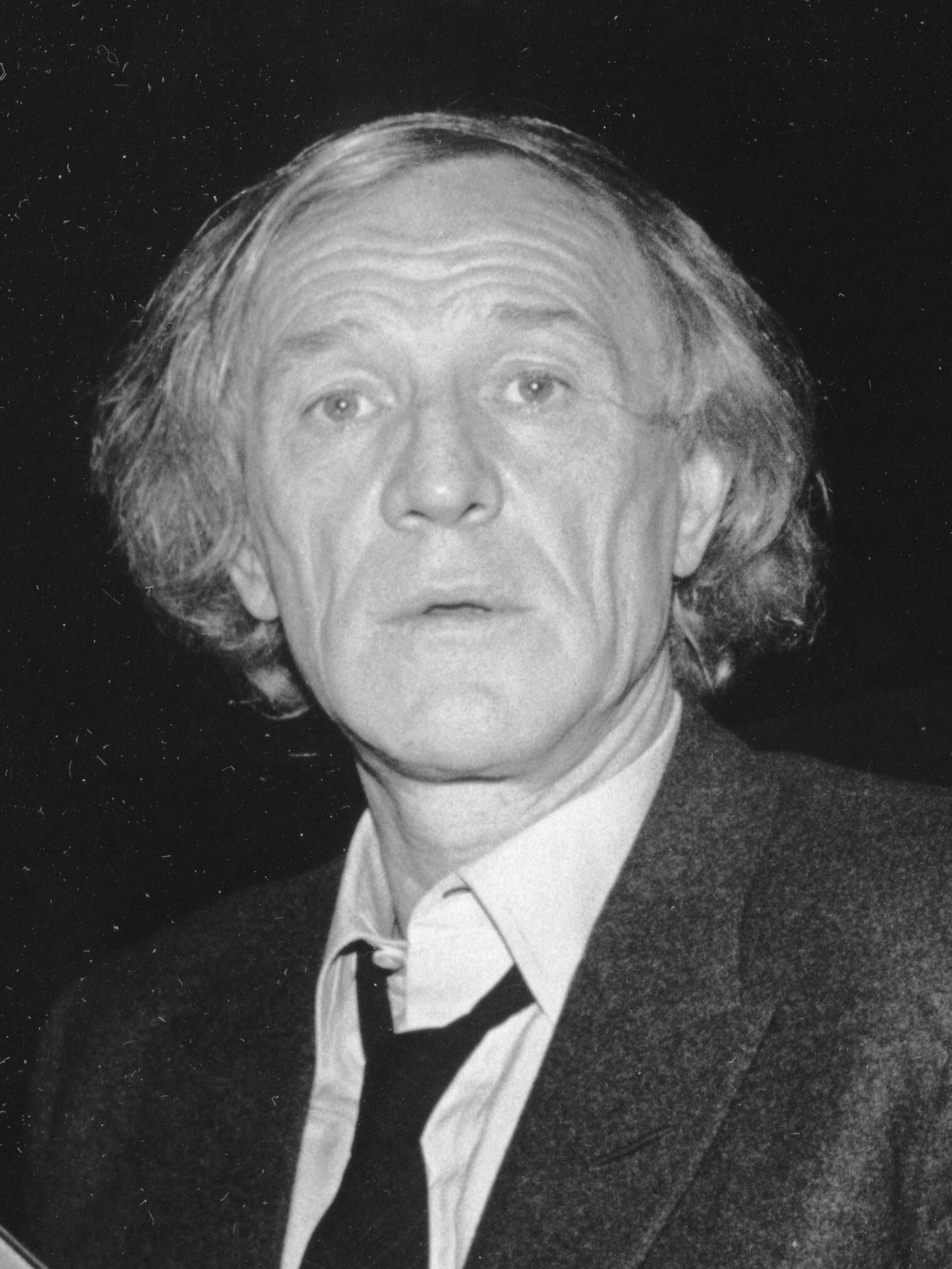
Richard Harris won for Camelot (1967)

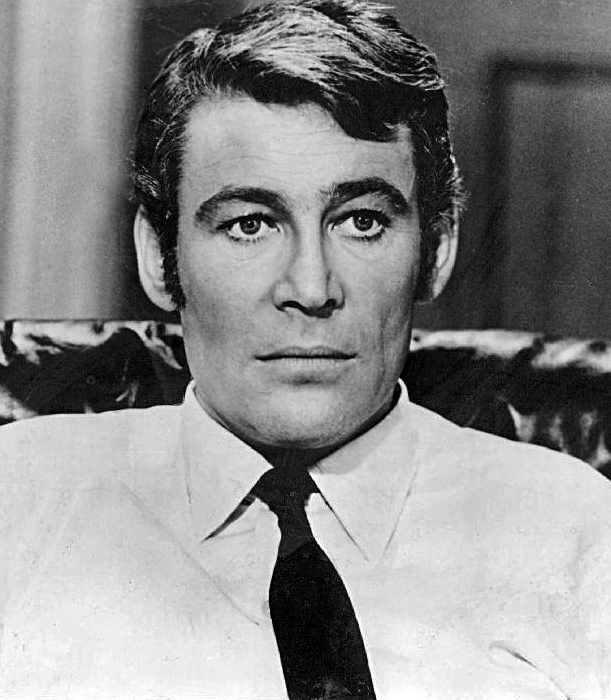
Peter O'Toole won for Goodbye, Mr. Chips (1969)

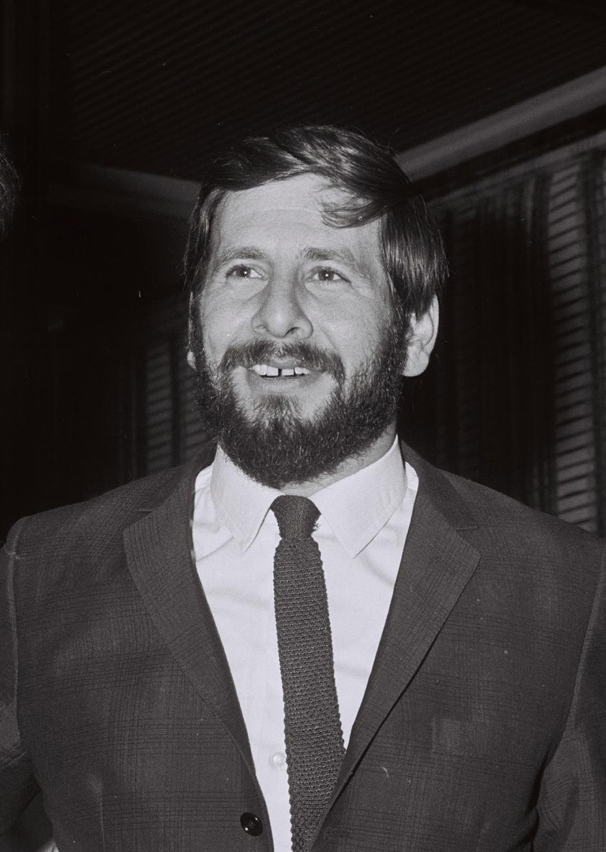
Topol won for Fiddler on the Roof (1971)

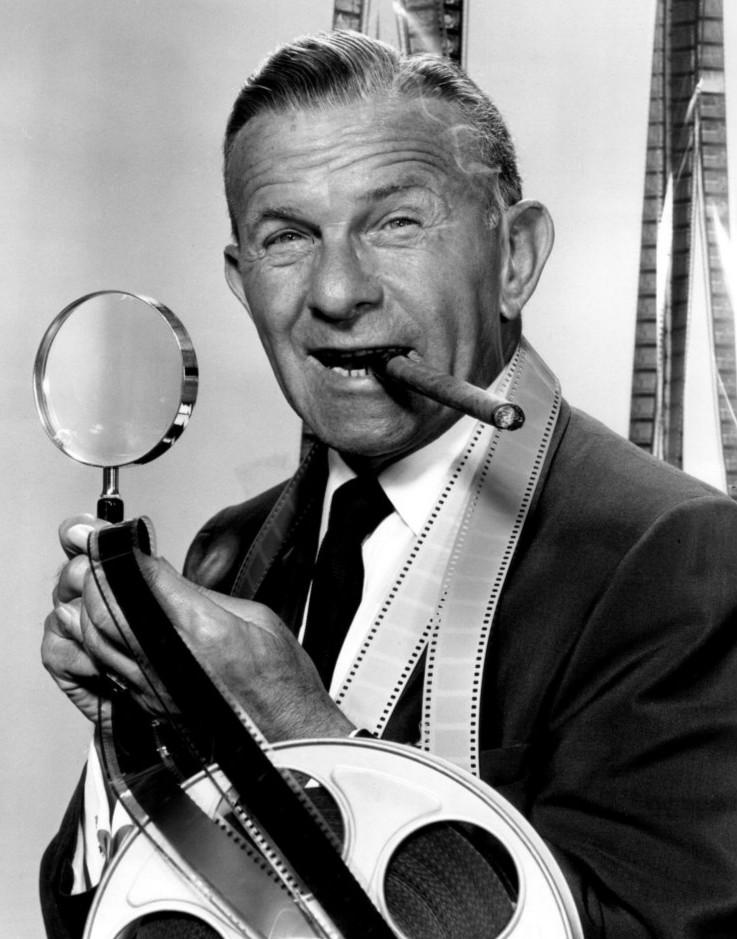
George Burns won for The Sunshine Boys (1975)

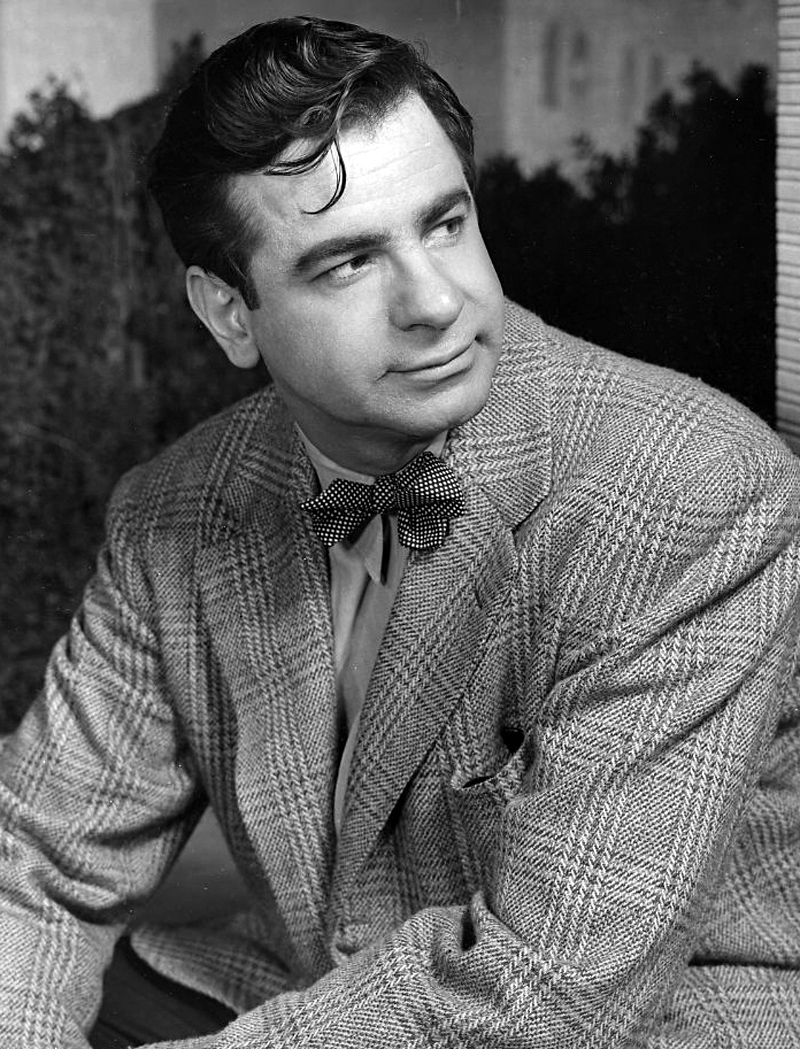
Walter Matthau won for The Sunshine Boys (1975)

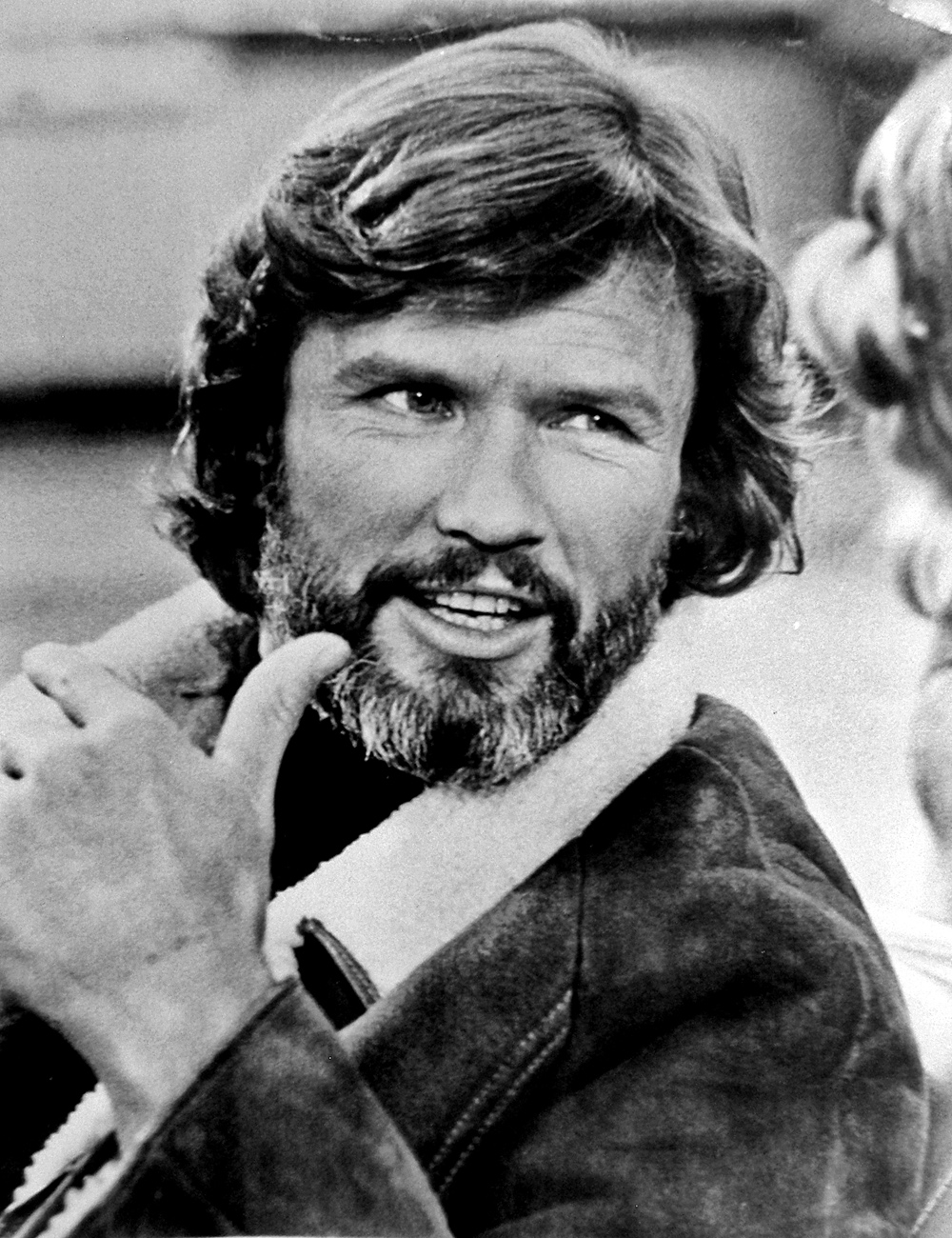
Kris Kristofferson won for A Star is Born (1976)

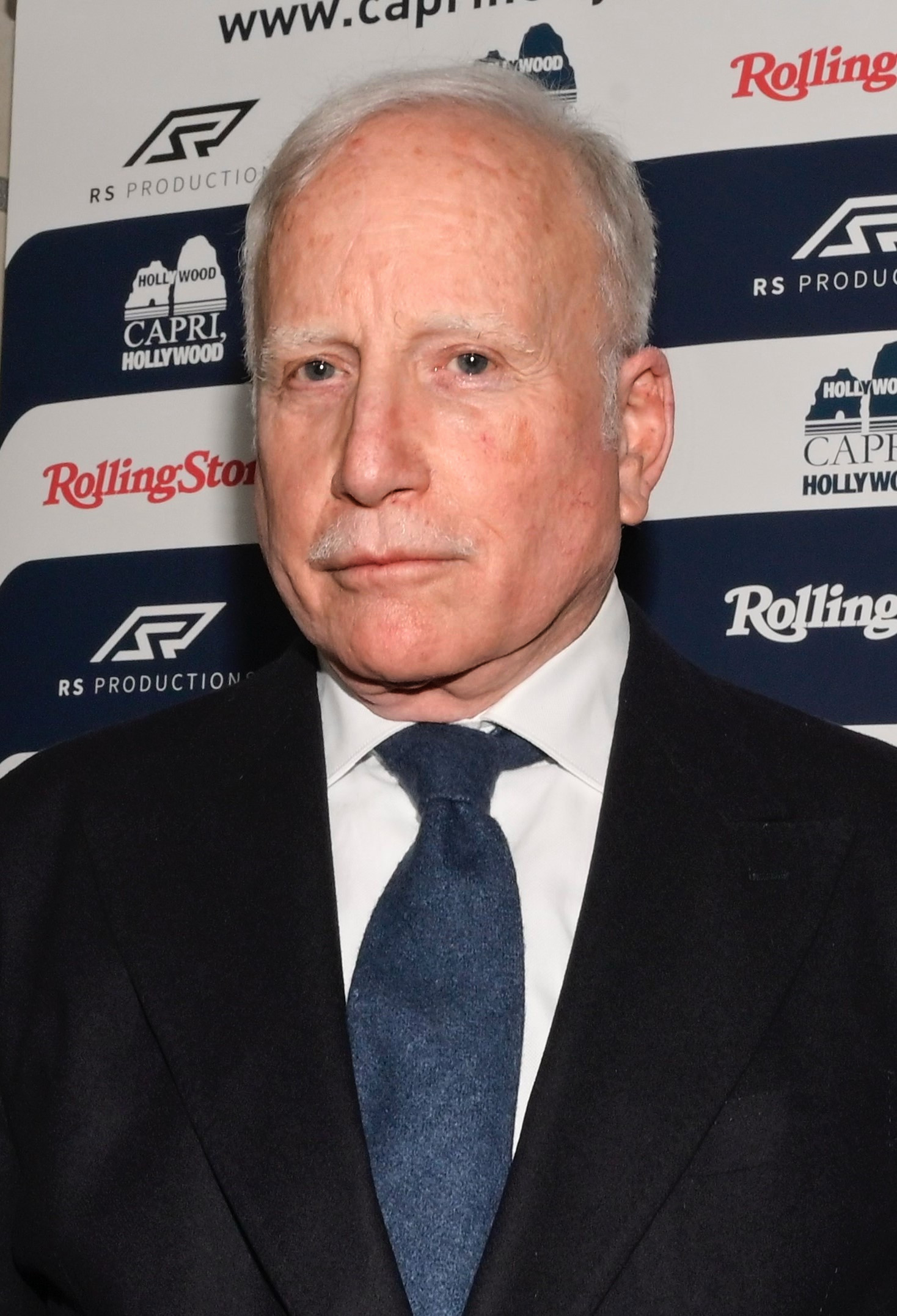
Richard Dreyfus won for The Goodbye Girl (1977)

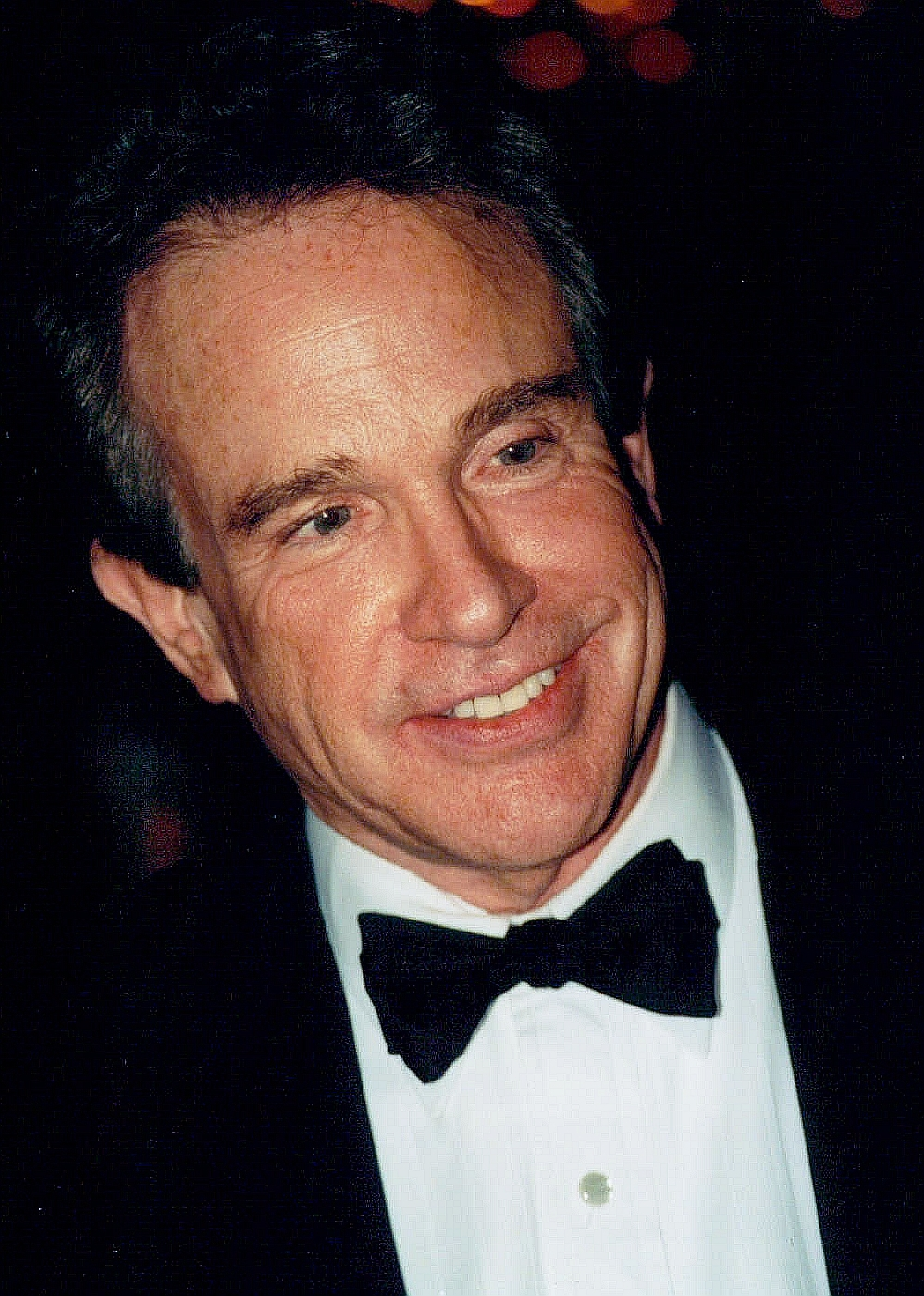
Warren Beatty won for Heaven Can Wait (1978)

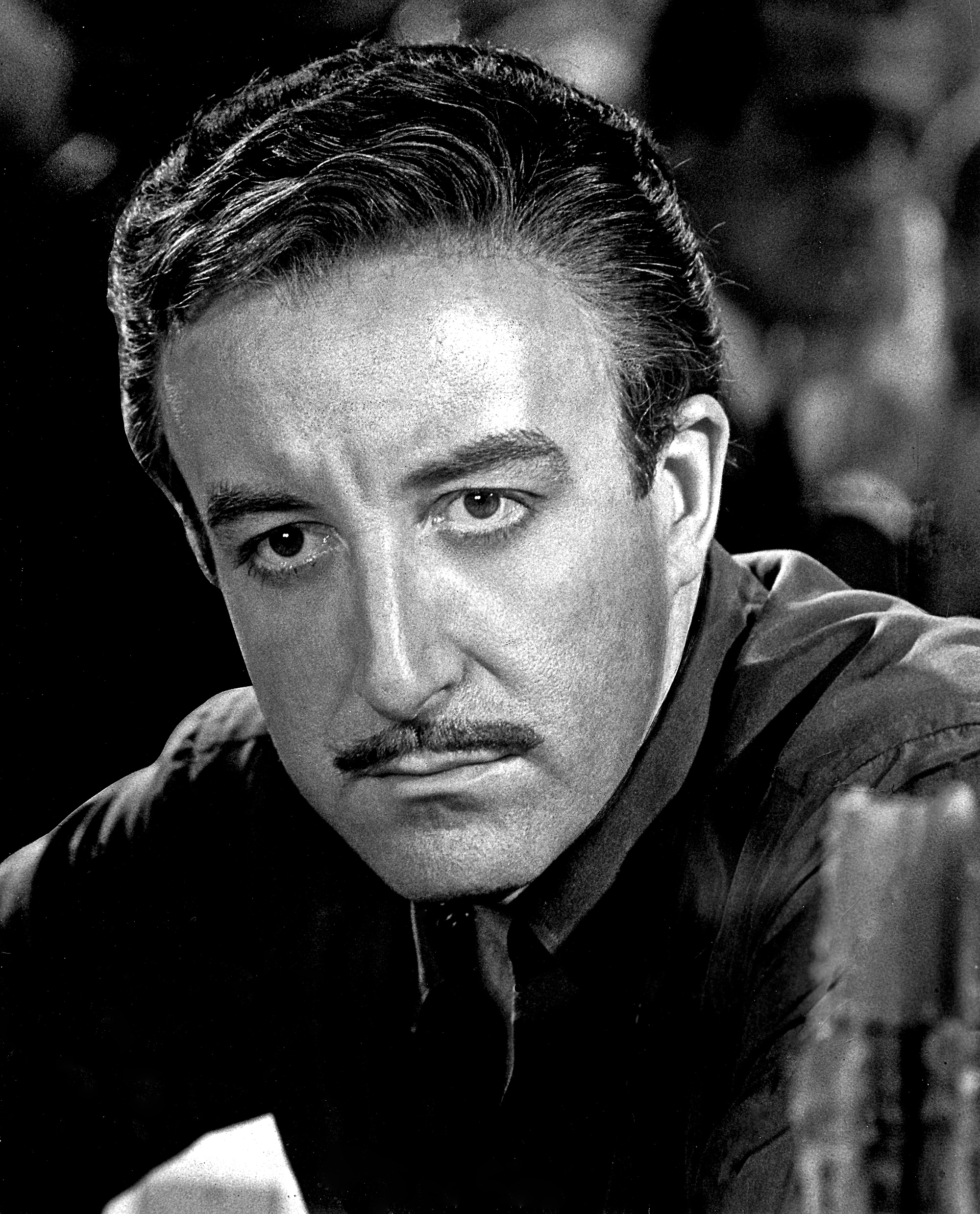
Peter Sellers won for Being There (1979)

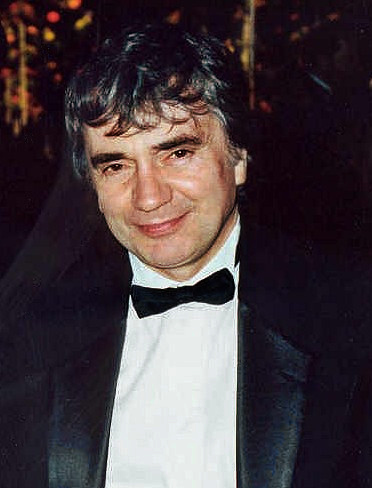
Dudley Moore won twice for Arthur (1981) and Micki & Maude (1984)

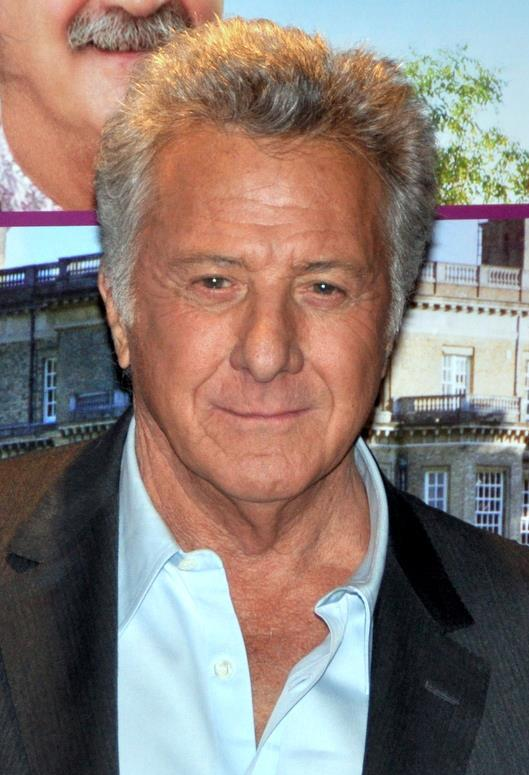
Dustin Hoffman won for Tootsie (1982)

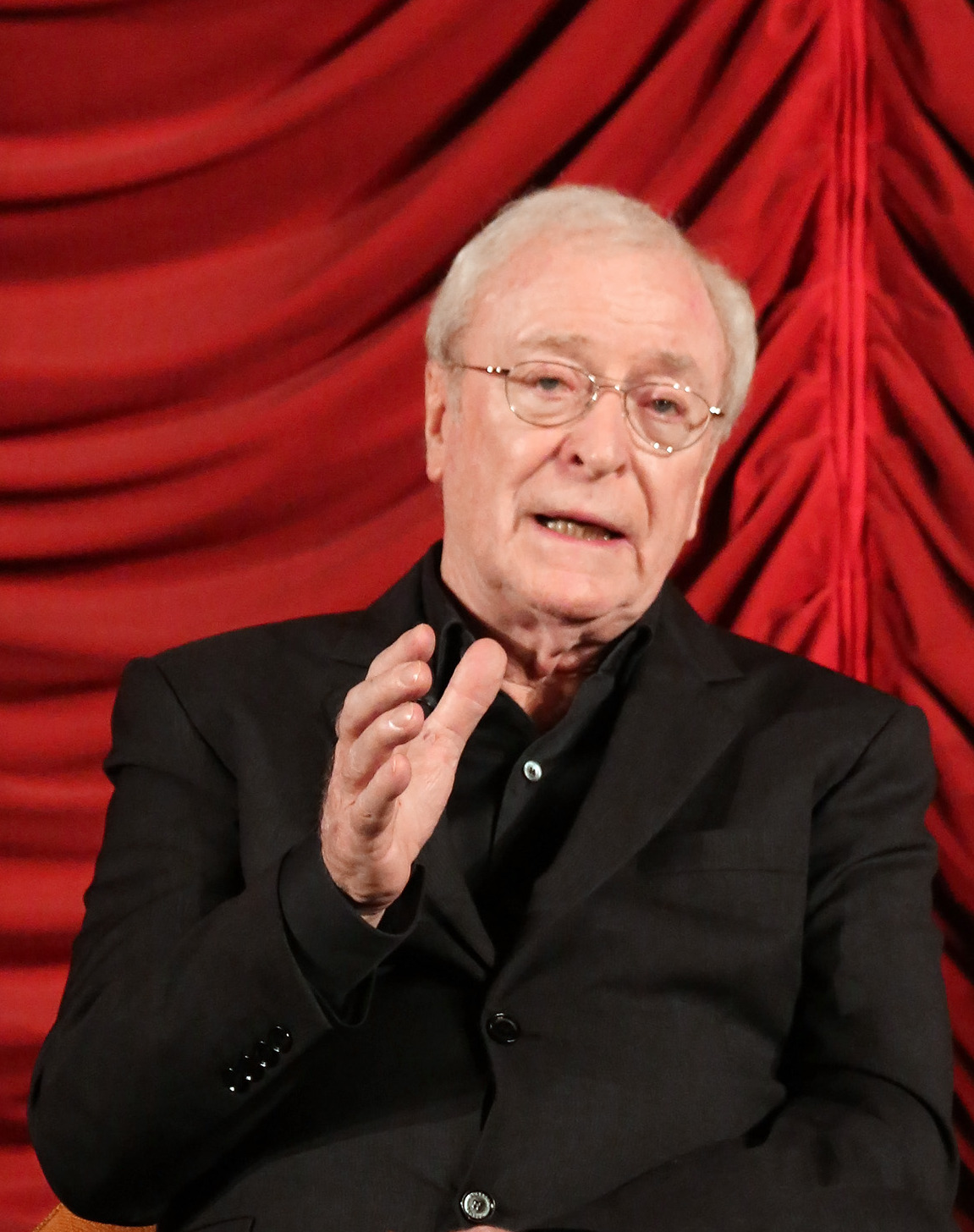
Michael Caine won for Educating Rita (1983) and Little Voice (1999)

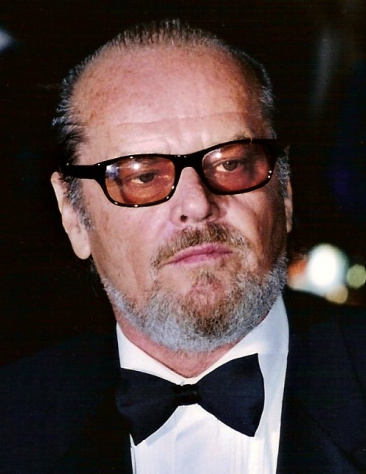
Jack Nicholson won twice for Prizzi's Honor (1985) and As Good as It Gets (1997)

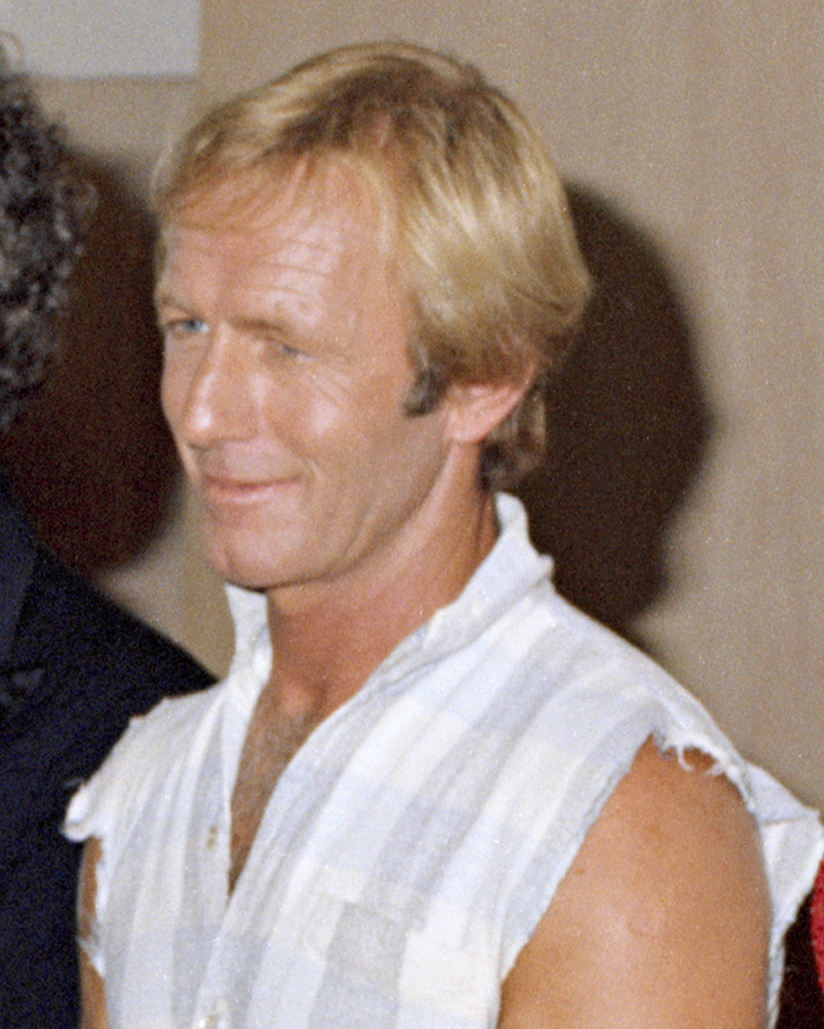
Paul Hogan won for Crocodile Dundee (1986)

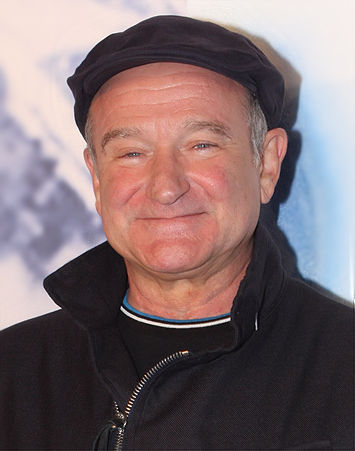
Robin Williams won thrice for Good Morning, Vietnam (1987), The Fisher King (1991), and Mrs. Doubtfire (1993)

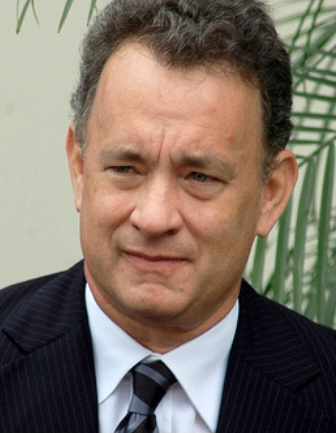
Tom Hanks won for Big (1988)

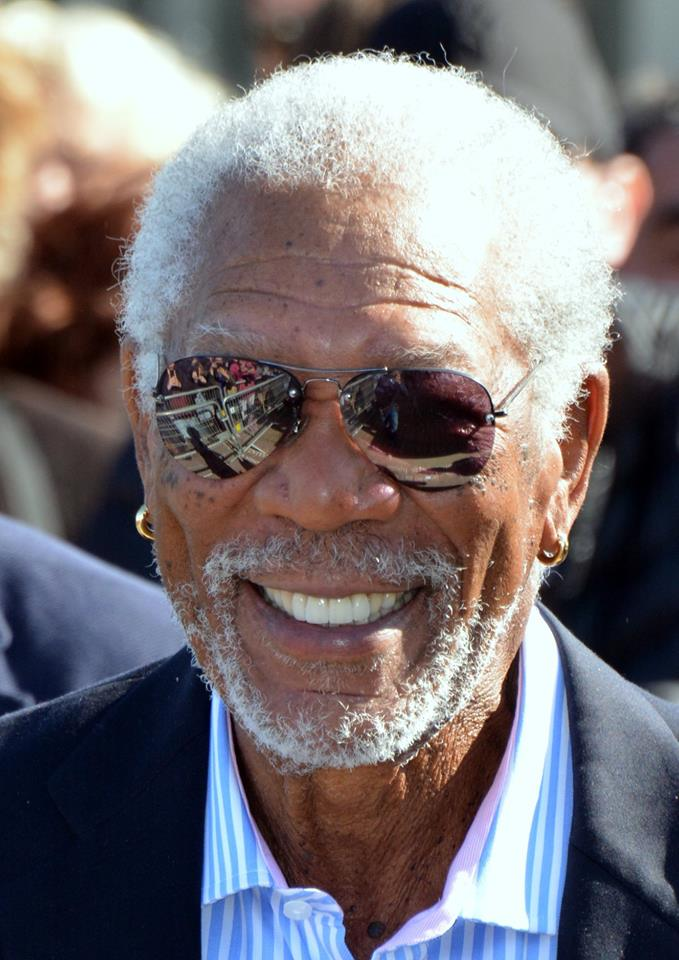
Morgan Freeman won for Driving Miss Daisy (1989)

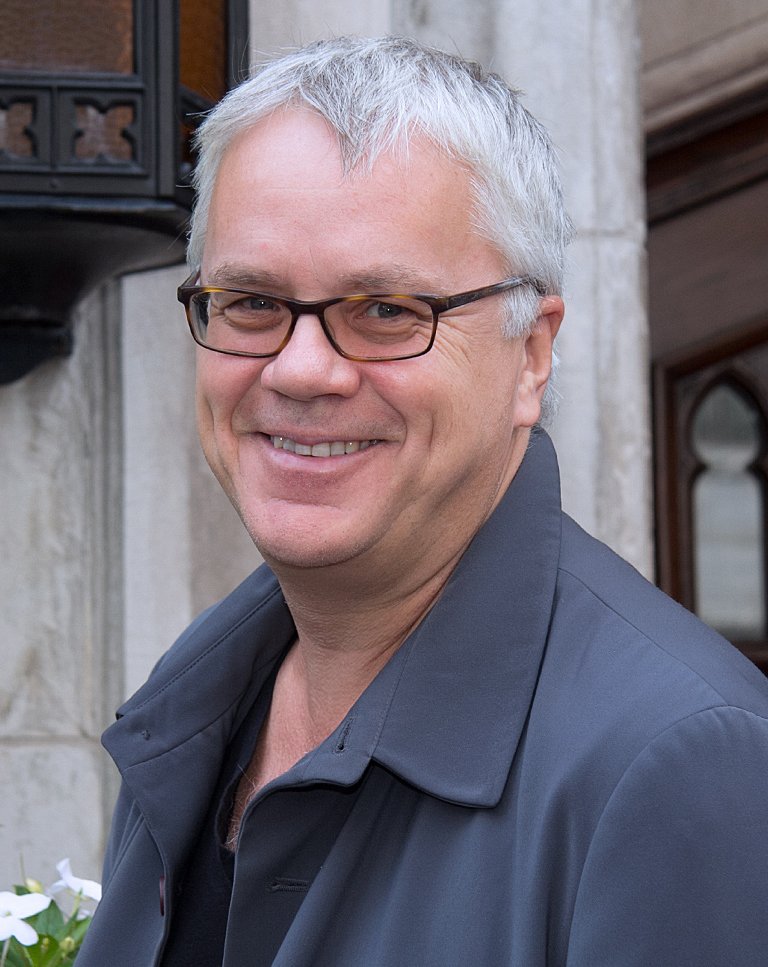
Tim Robbins won for The Player (1992)

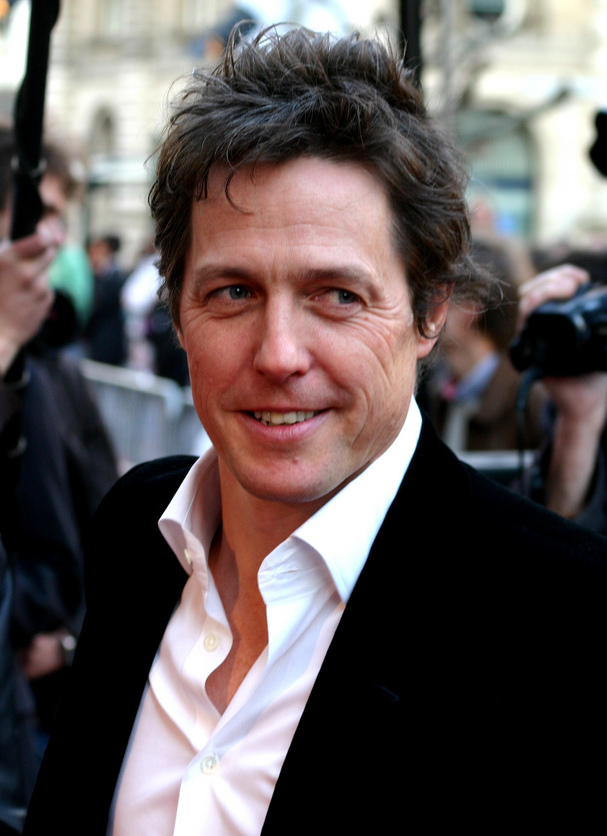
Hugh Grant won for Four Weddings and a Funeral (1994)

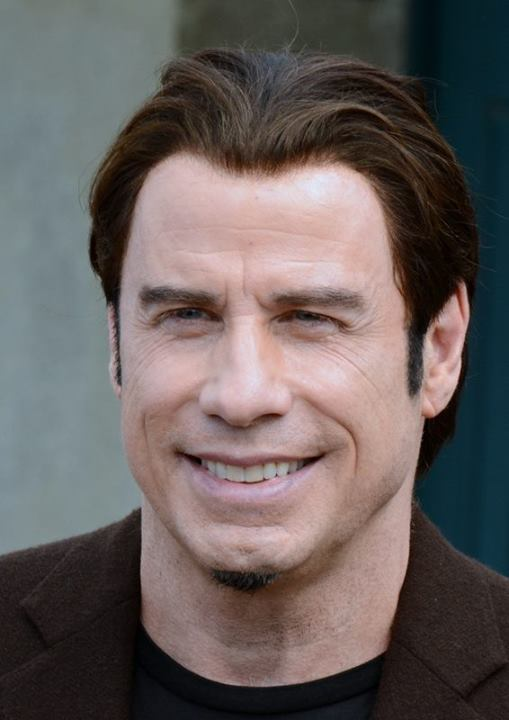
John Travolta won for Get Shorty (1995)

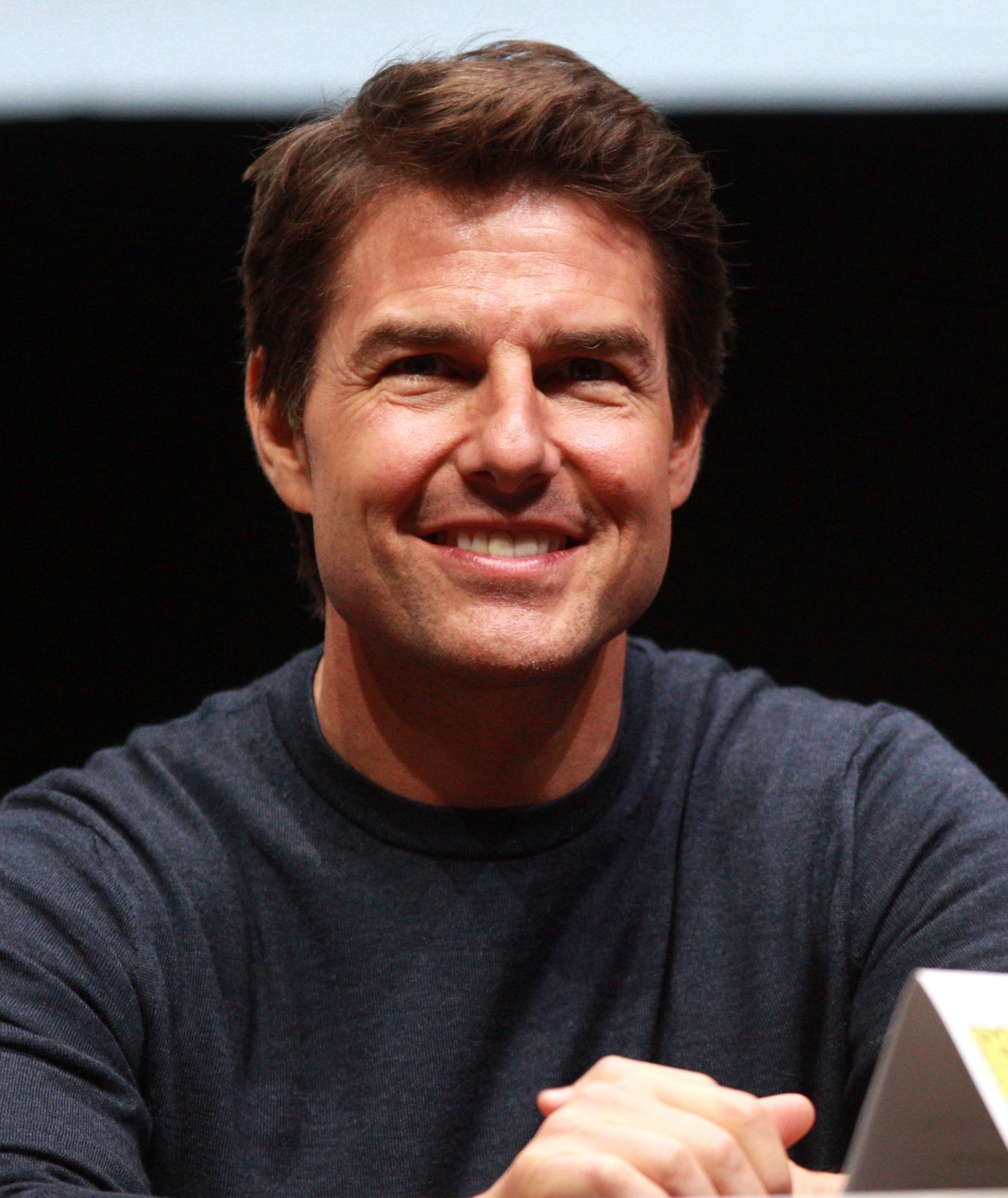
Tom Cruise won for Jerry Maguire (1996)

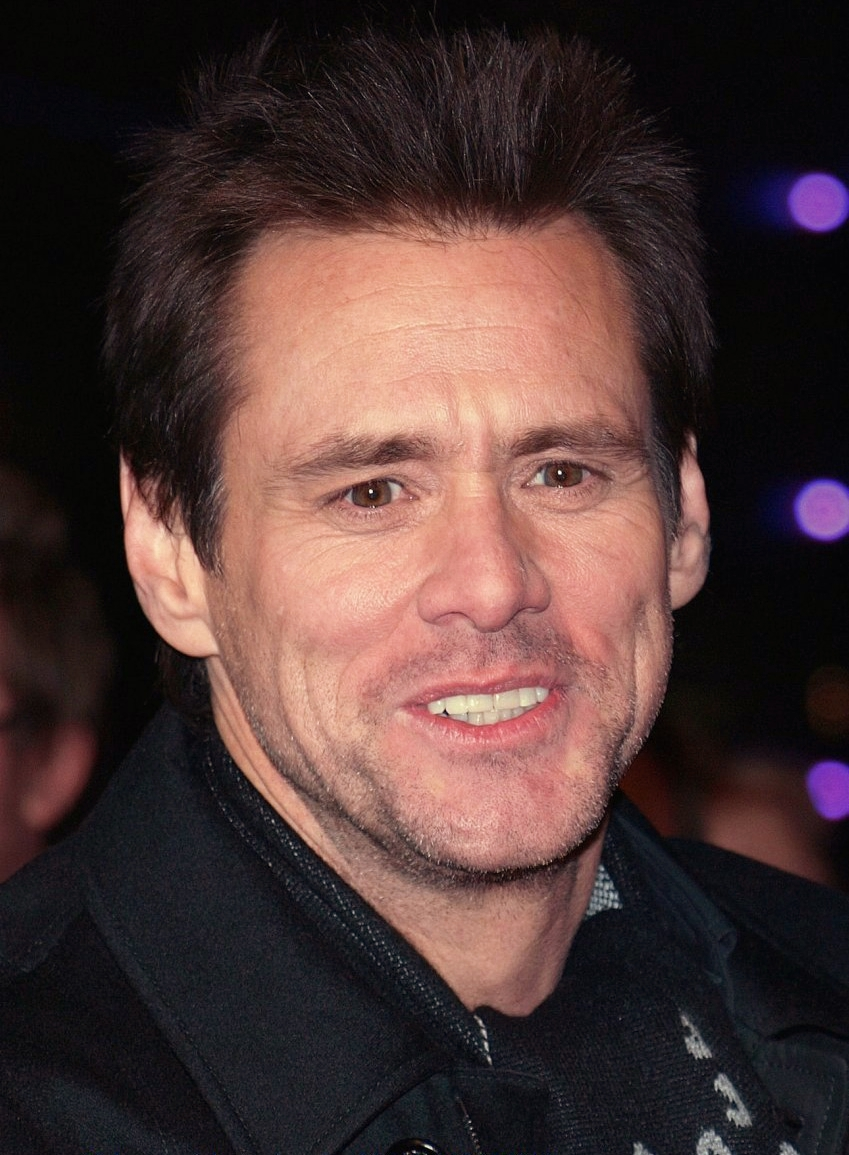
Jim Carrey won for Man on the Moon (1999)

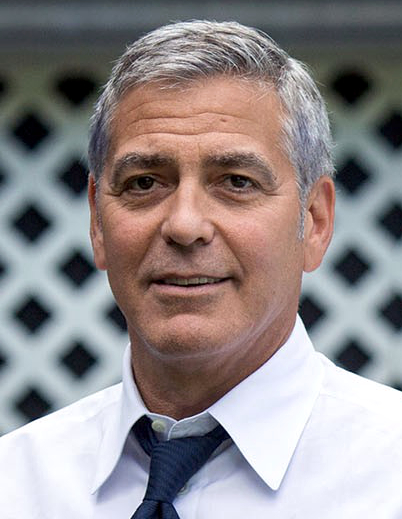
George Clooney won for O Brother, Where Art Thou? (2000)

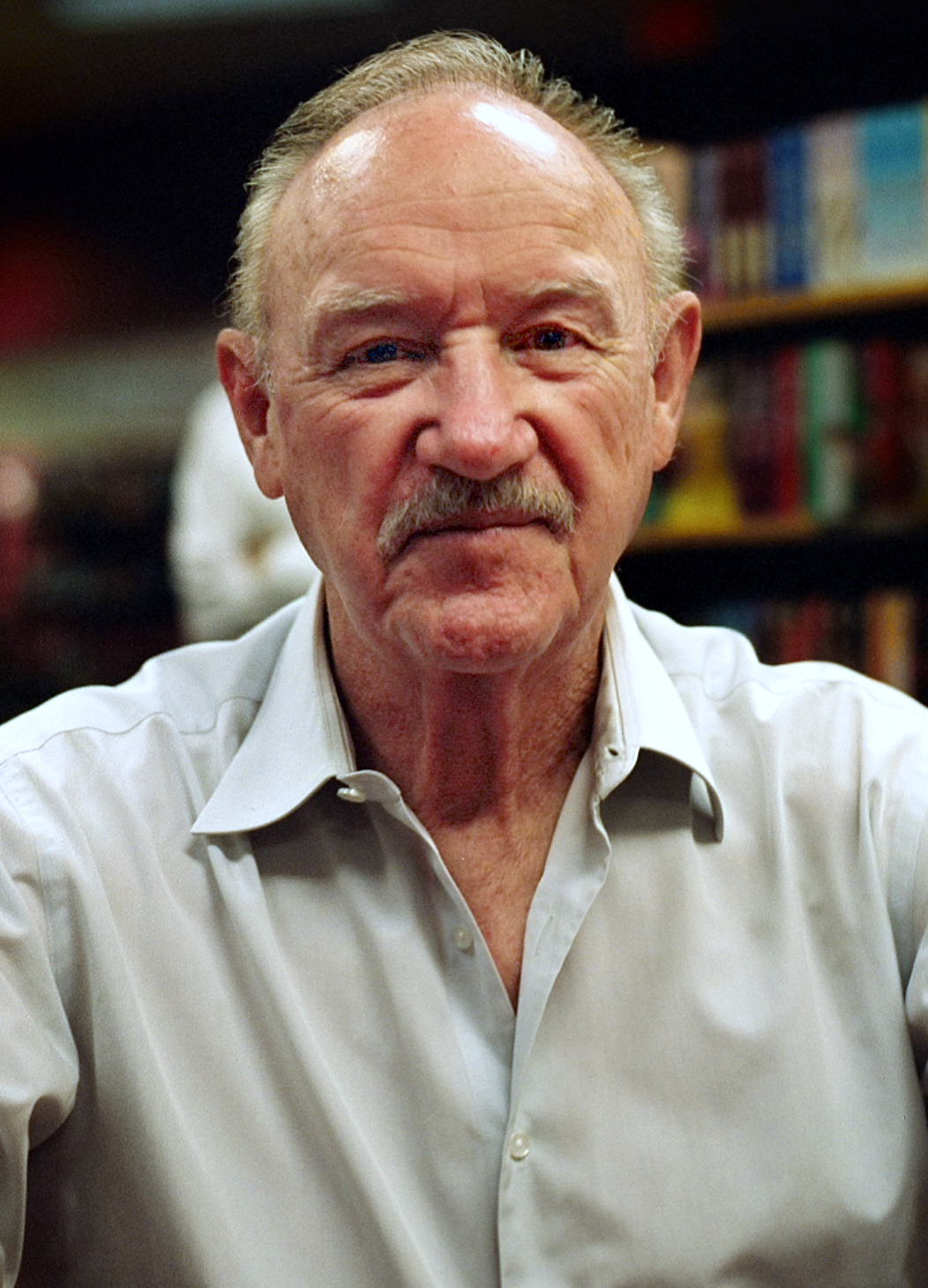
Gene Hackman won for The Royal Tenenbaums (2001)

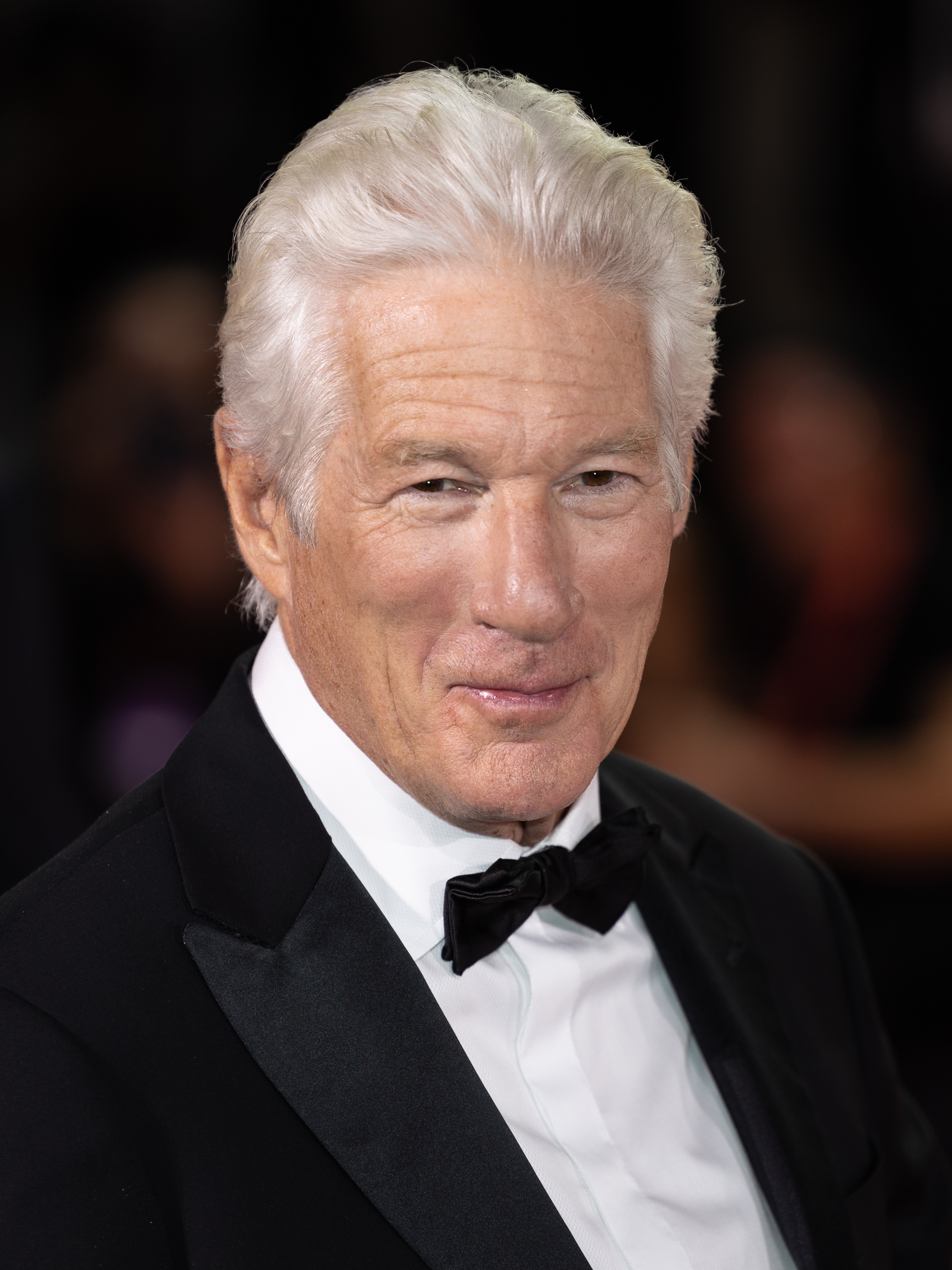
Richard Gere won for Chicago (2002)

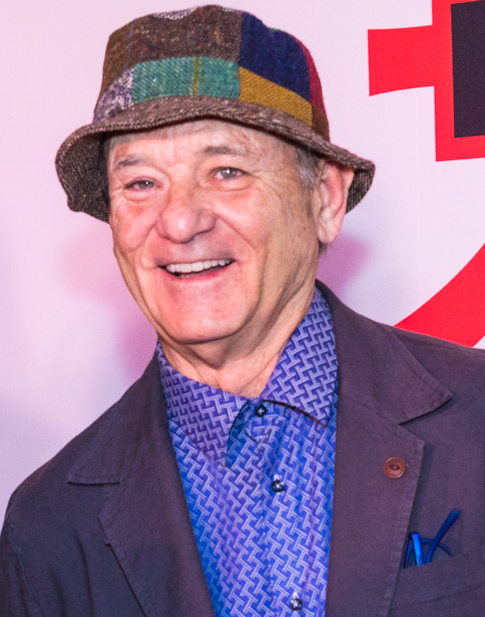
Bill Murray won for Lost in Translation (2003)

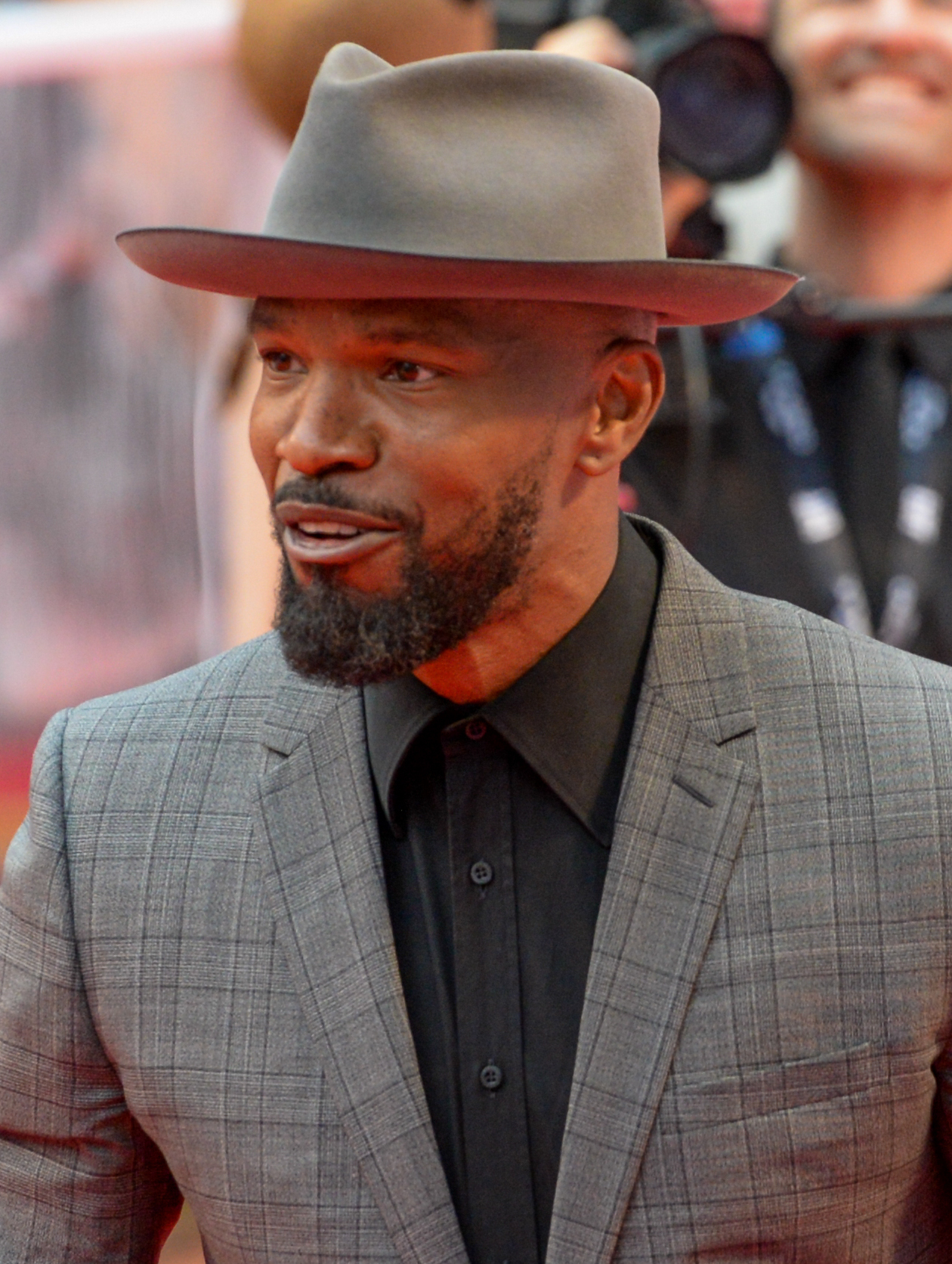
Jamie Foxx won for Ray (2004)

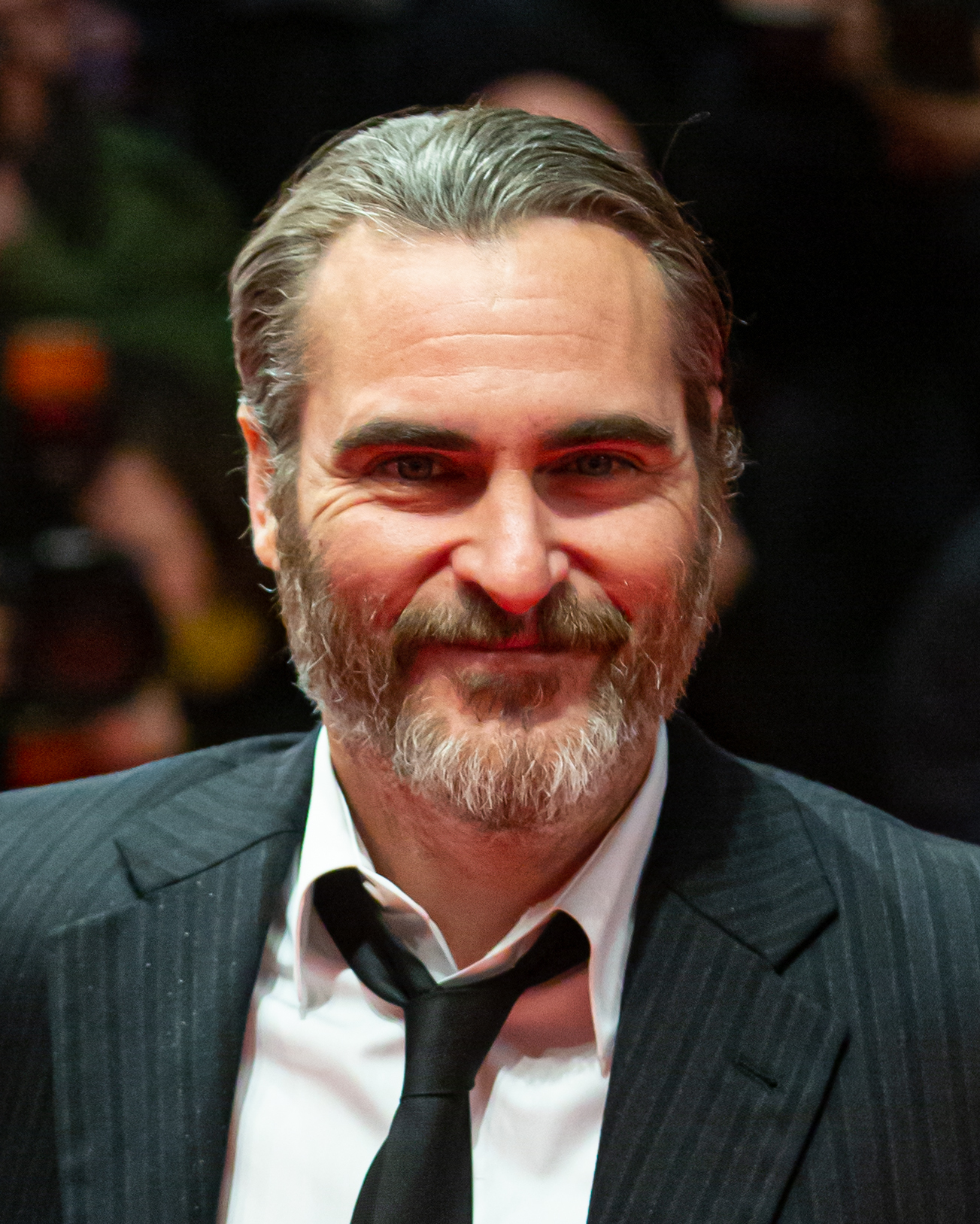
Joaquin Phoenix won for Walk the Line (2005)

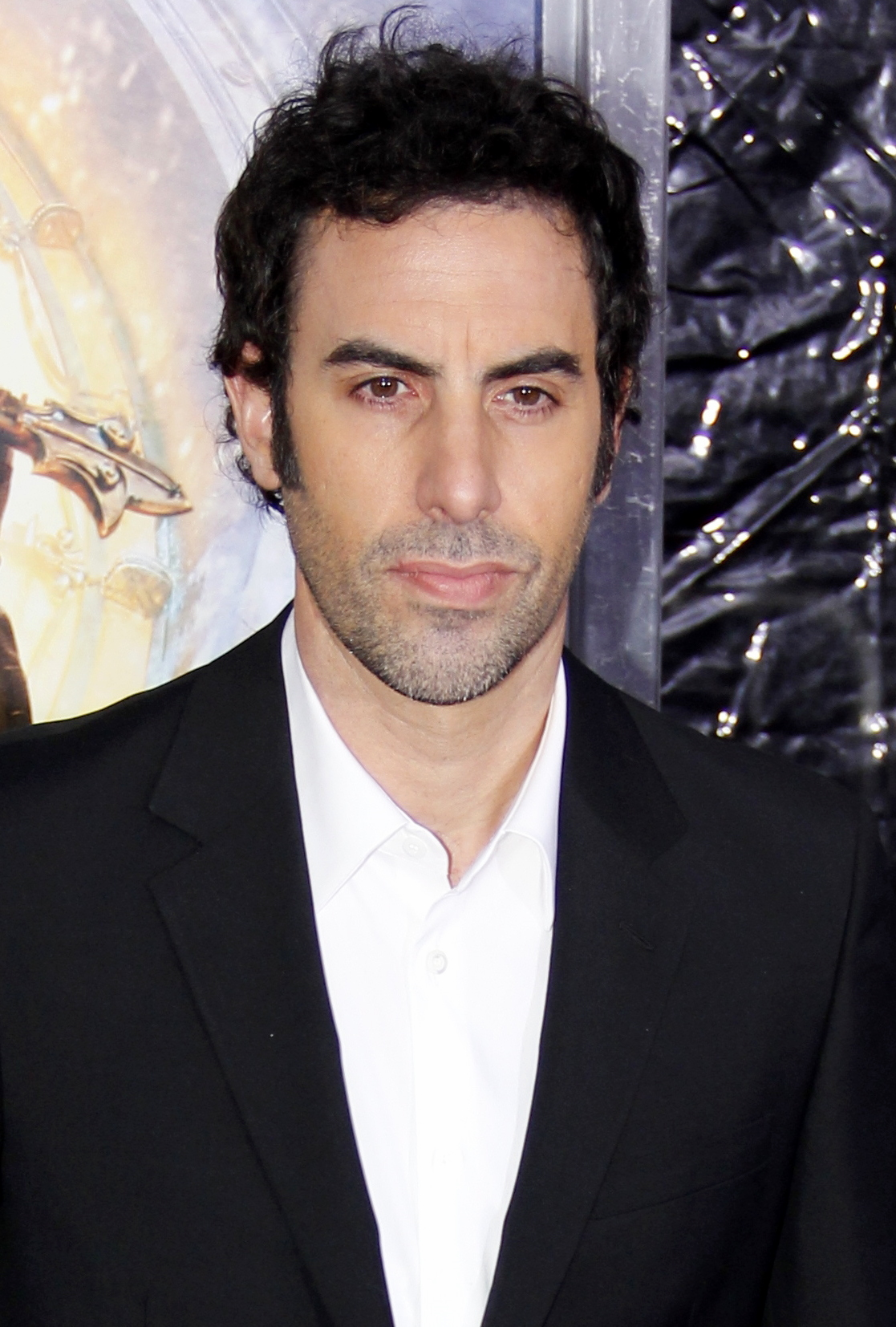
Sacha Baron Cohen won twice for Borat (2006) and Borat Subsequent Moviefilm (2020)

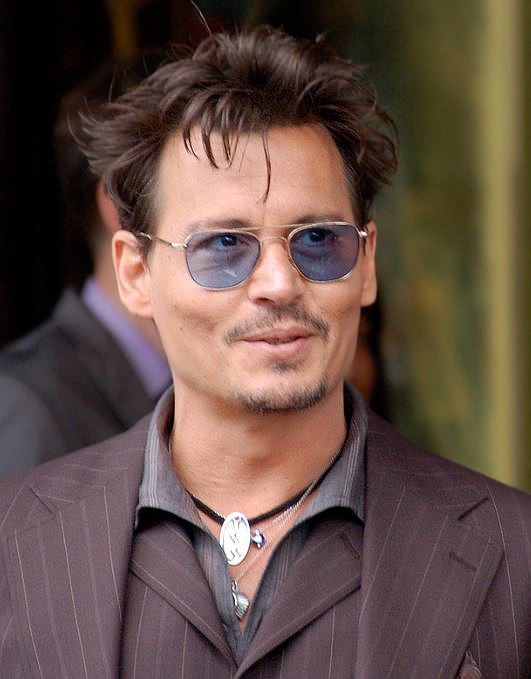
Johnny Depp won for Sweeney Todd: The Demon Barber of Fleet Street (2007)

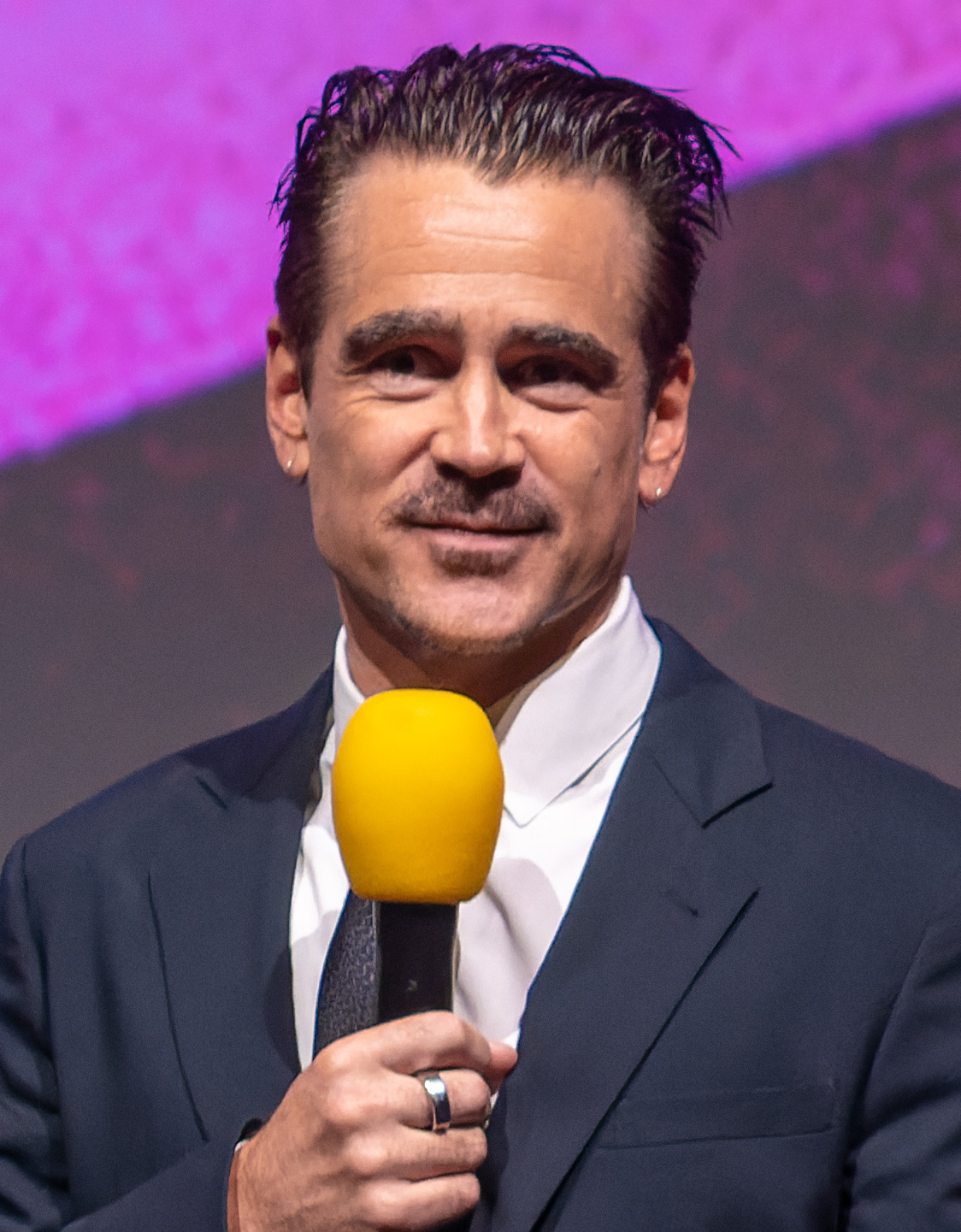
Colin Farrell won twice for In Bruges (2008) and The Banshees of Inisherin (2022)

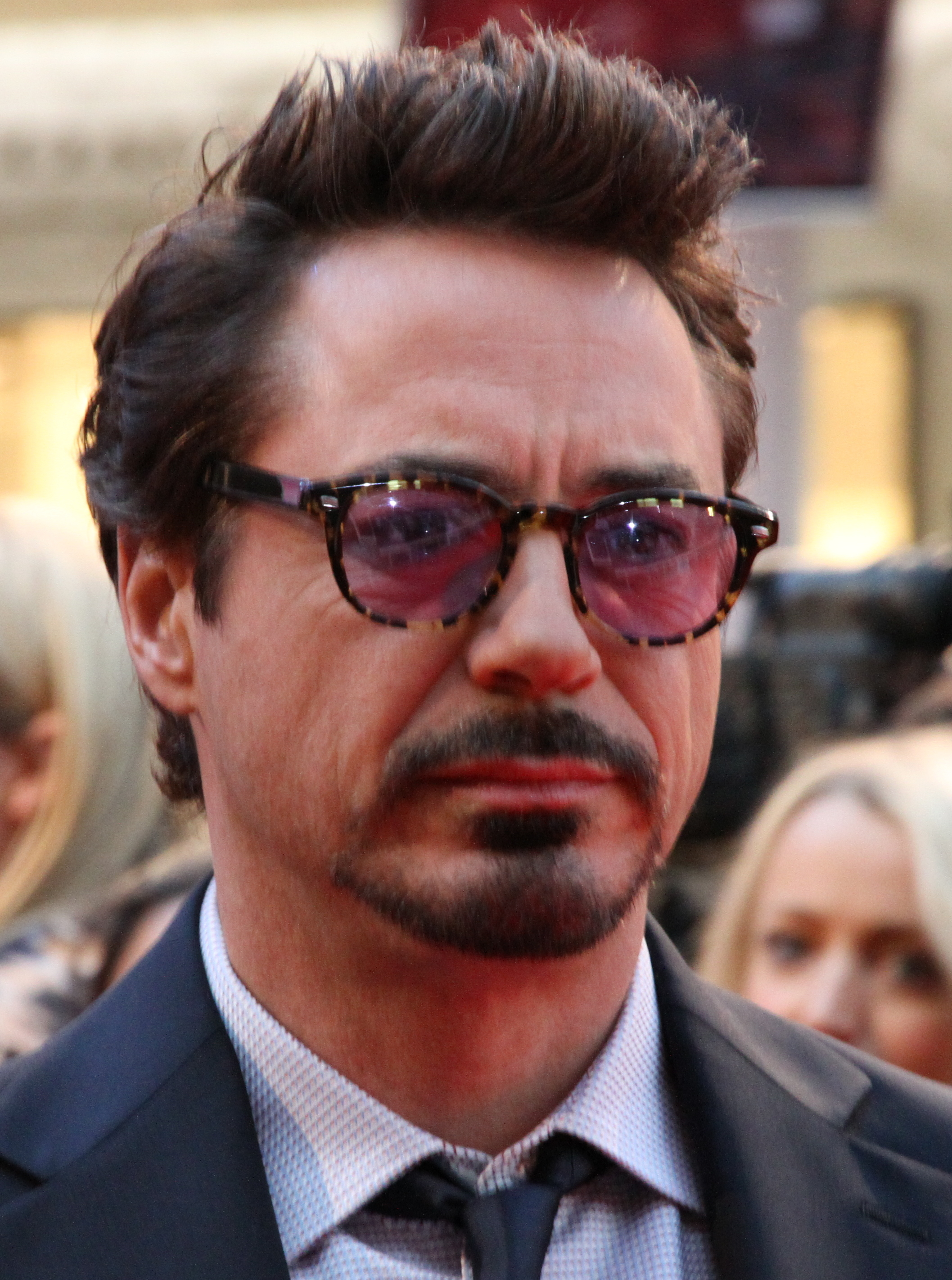
Robert Downey Jr. won for Sherlock Holmes (2009)

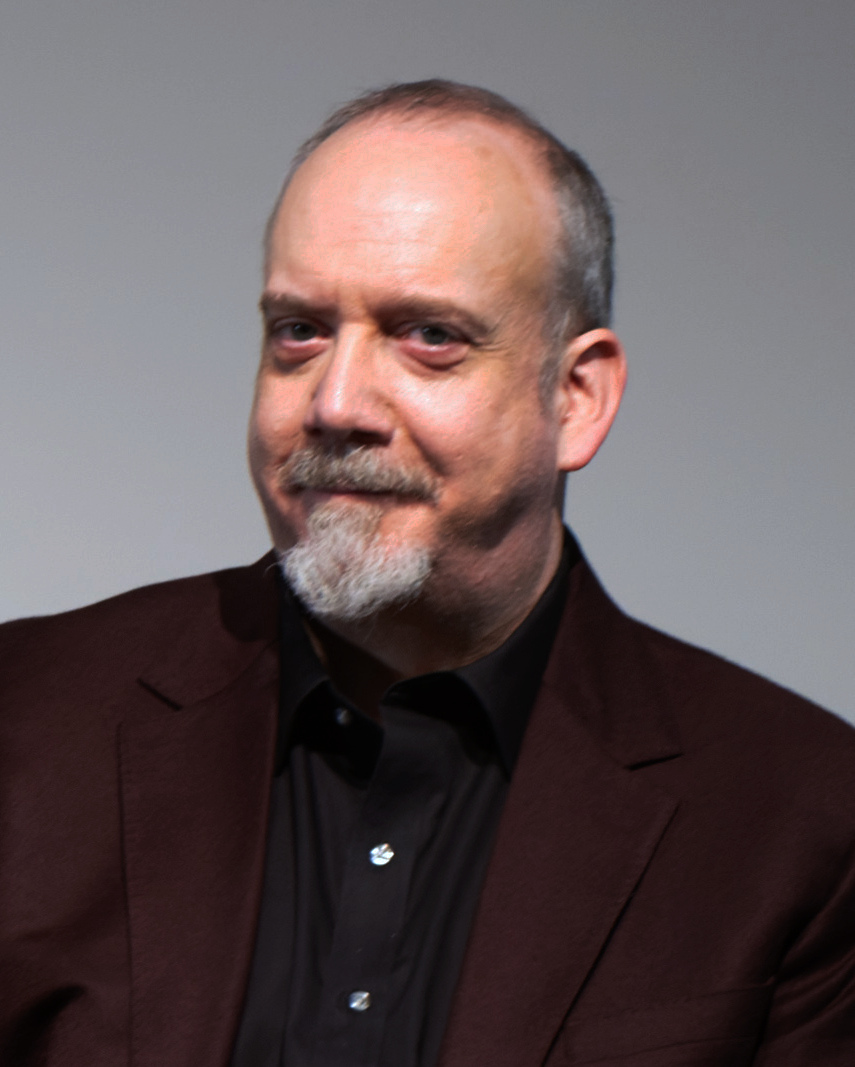
Paul Giamatti won twice for Barney's Version (2010) and The Holdovers (2023)

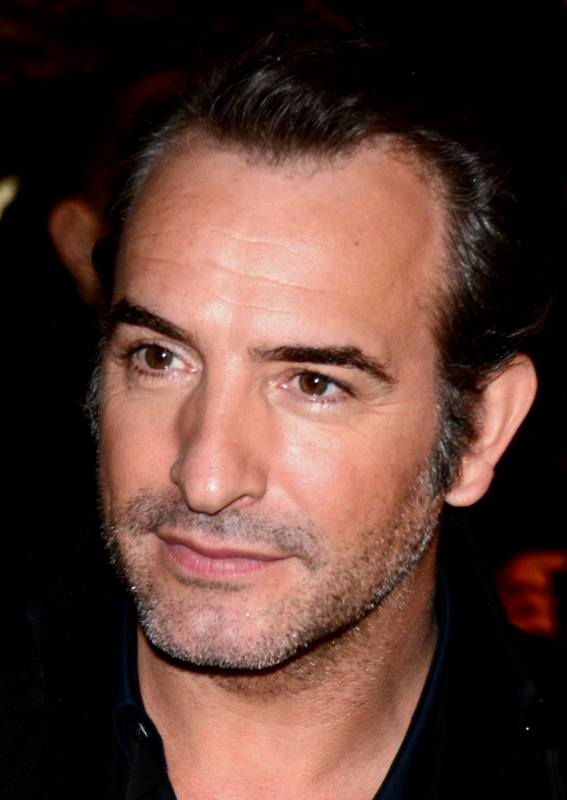
Jean Dujardin won for The Artist (2011)

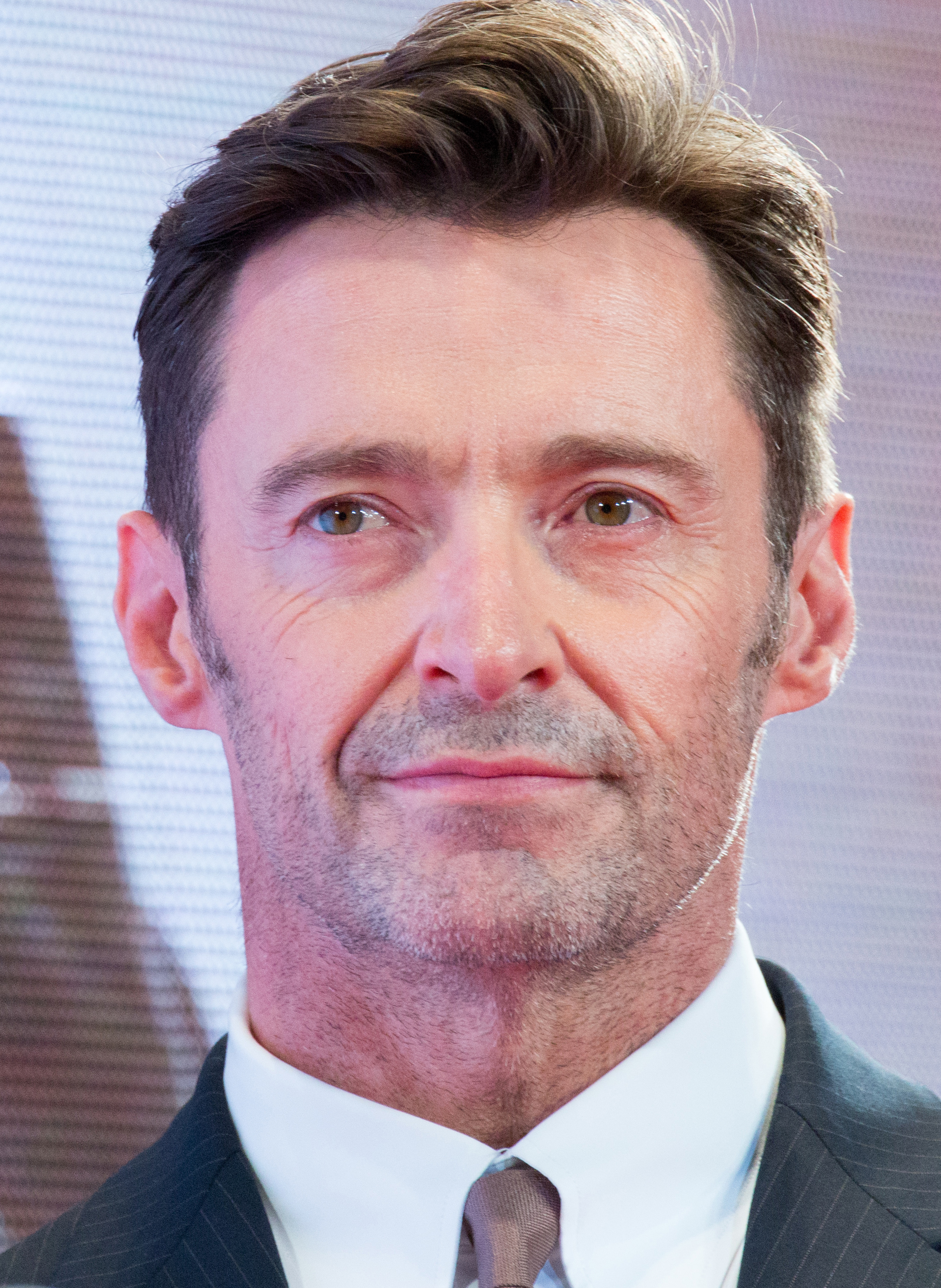
Hugh Jackman won for Les Misérables (2012)

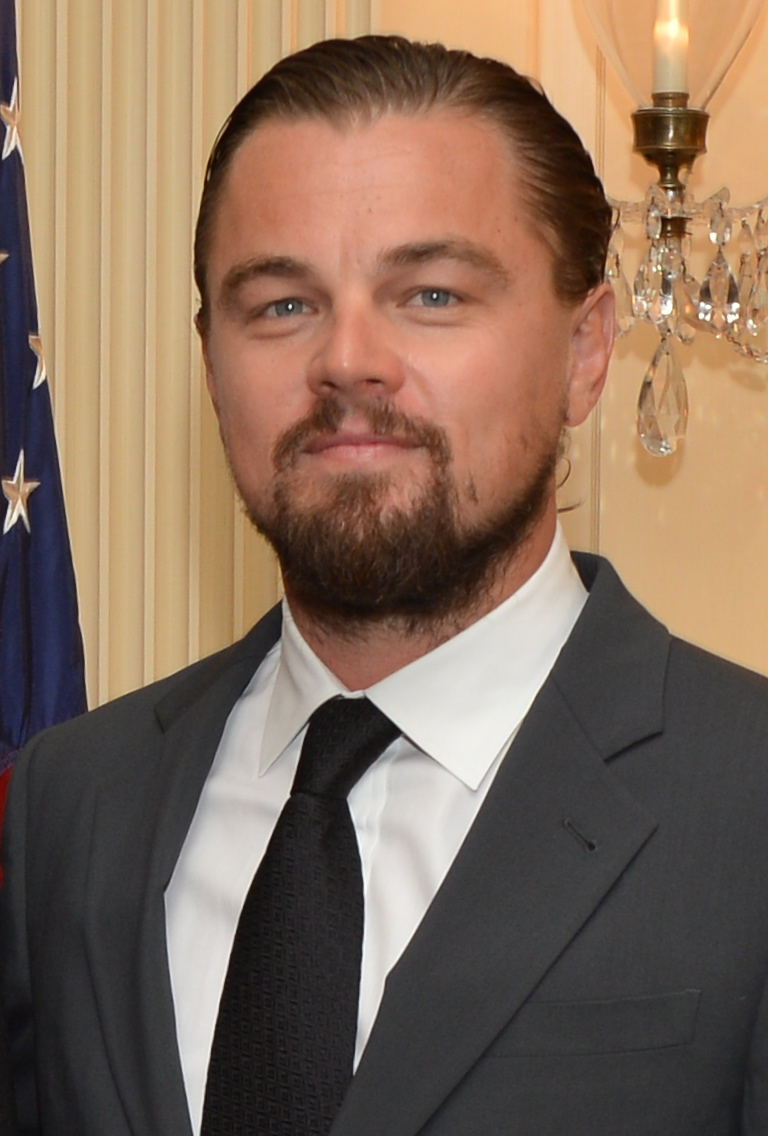
Leonardo DiCaprio won for The Wolf of Wall Street (2013)

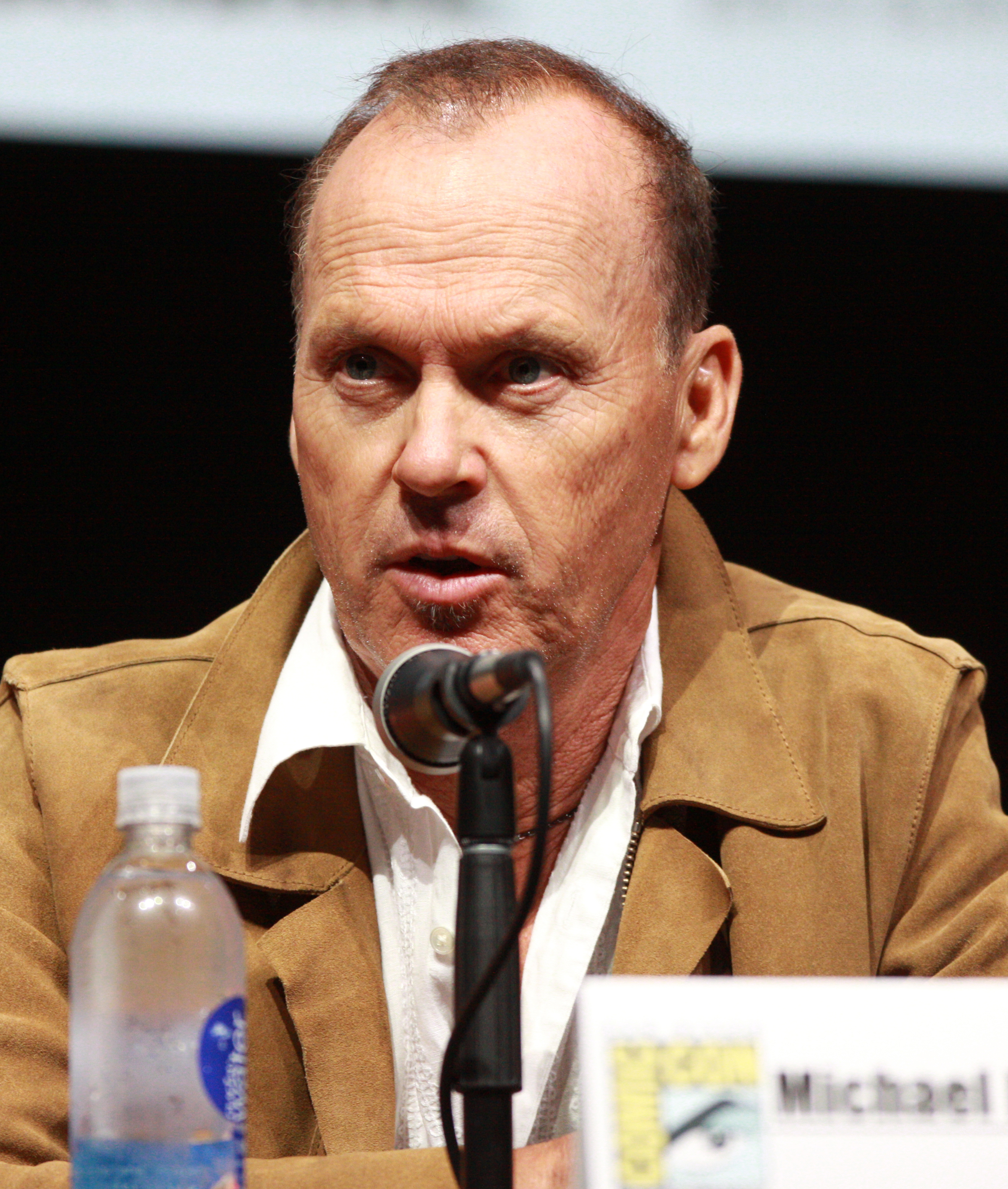
Michael Keaton won for Birdman or (The Unexpected Virtue of Ignorance) (2014)

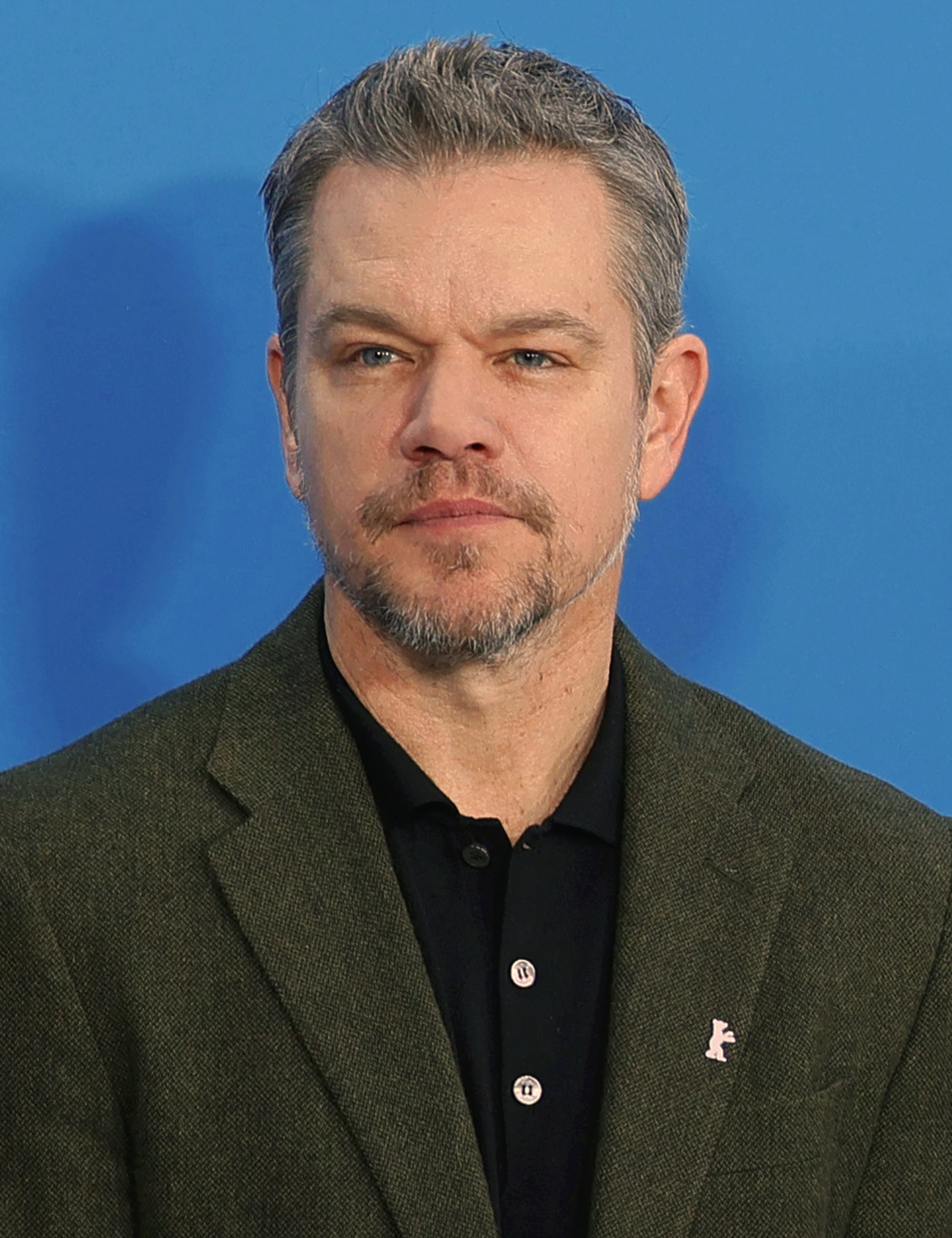
Matt Damon won for The Martian (2015)

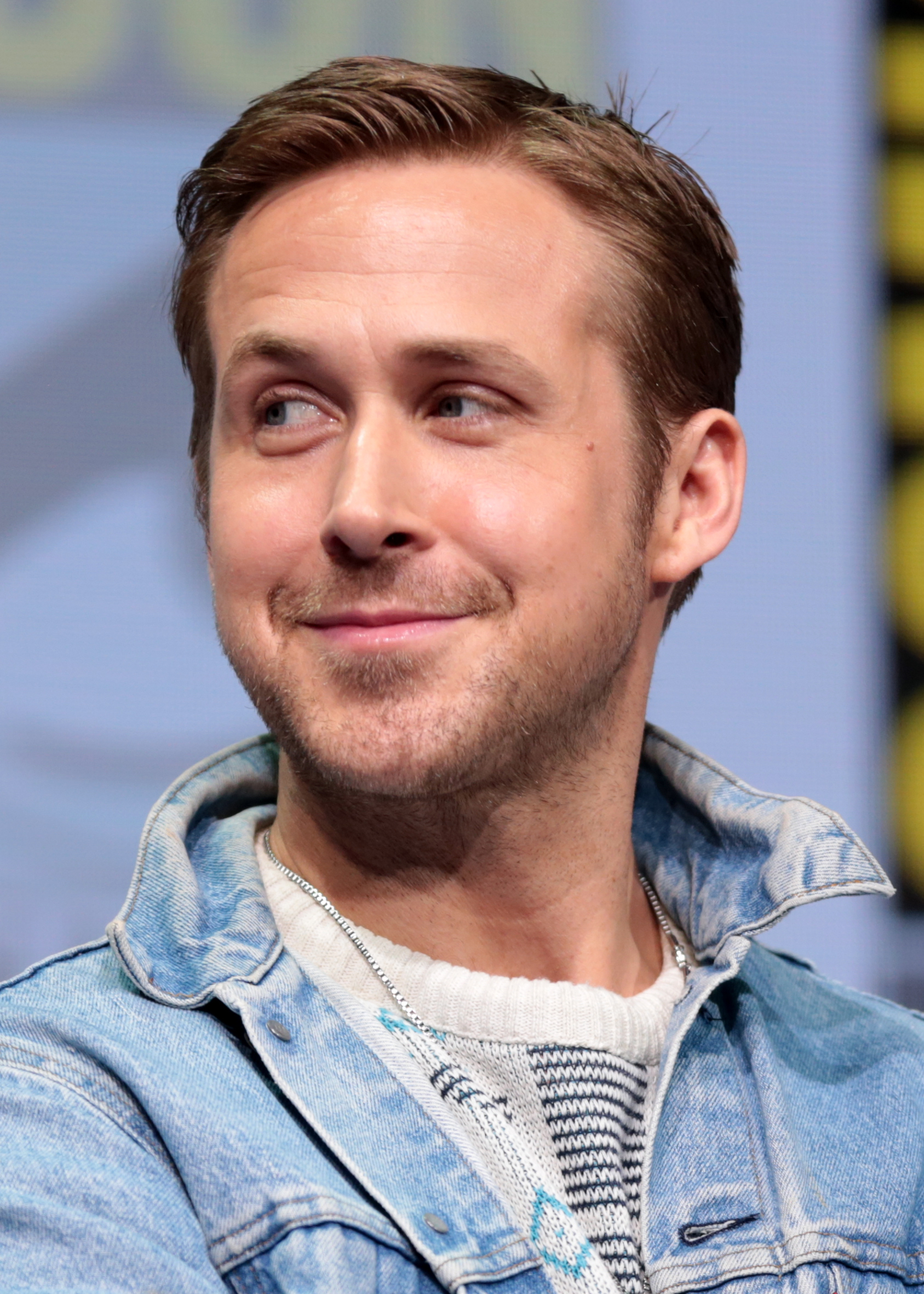
Ryan Gosling won for La La Land (2016)

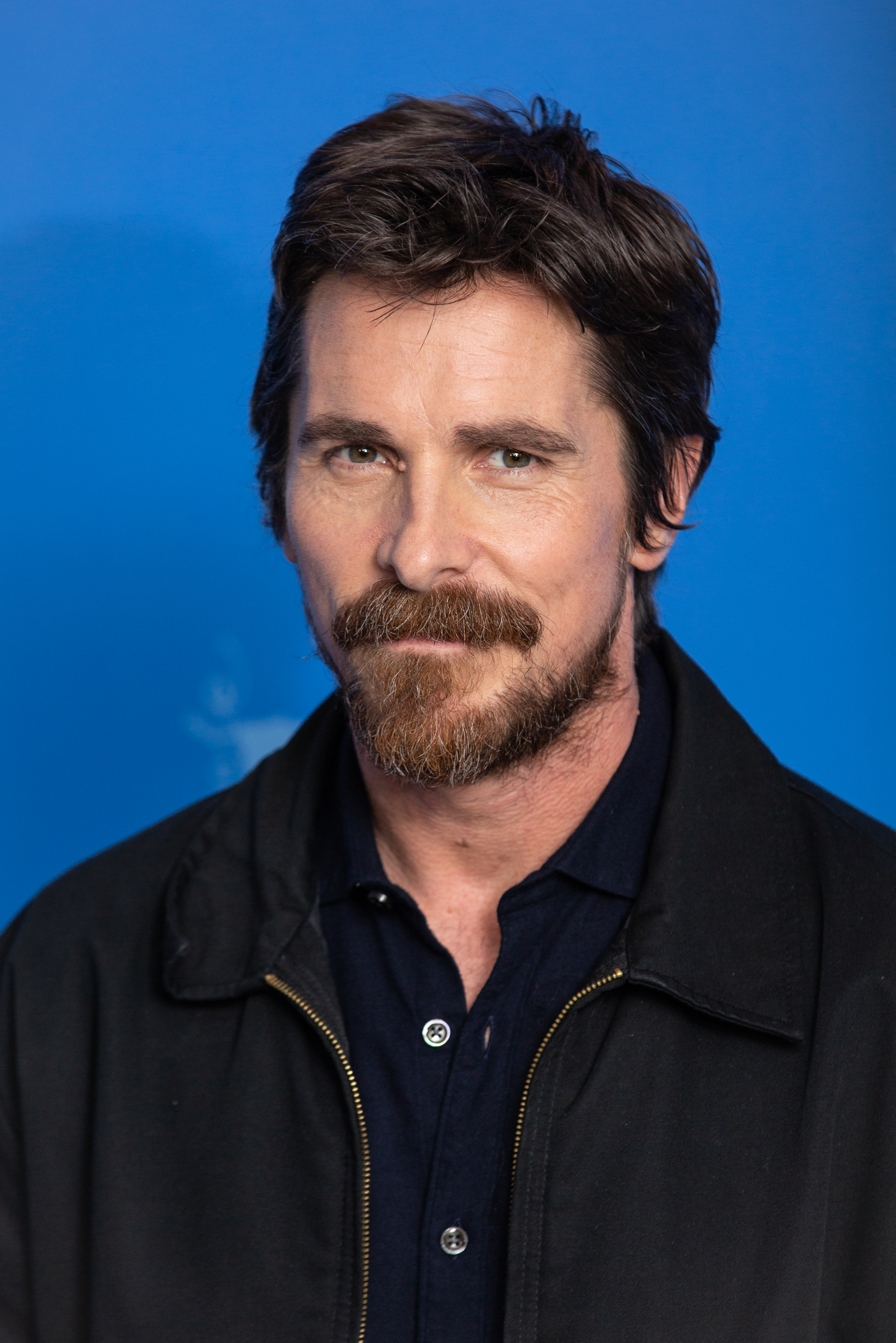
Christian Bale won for Vice (2018)

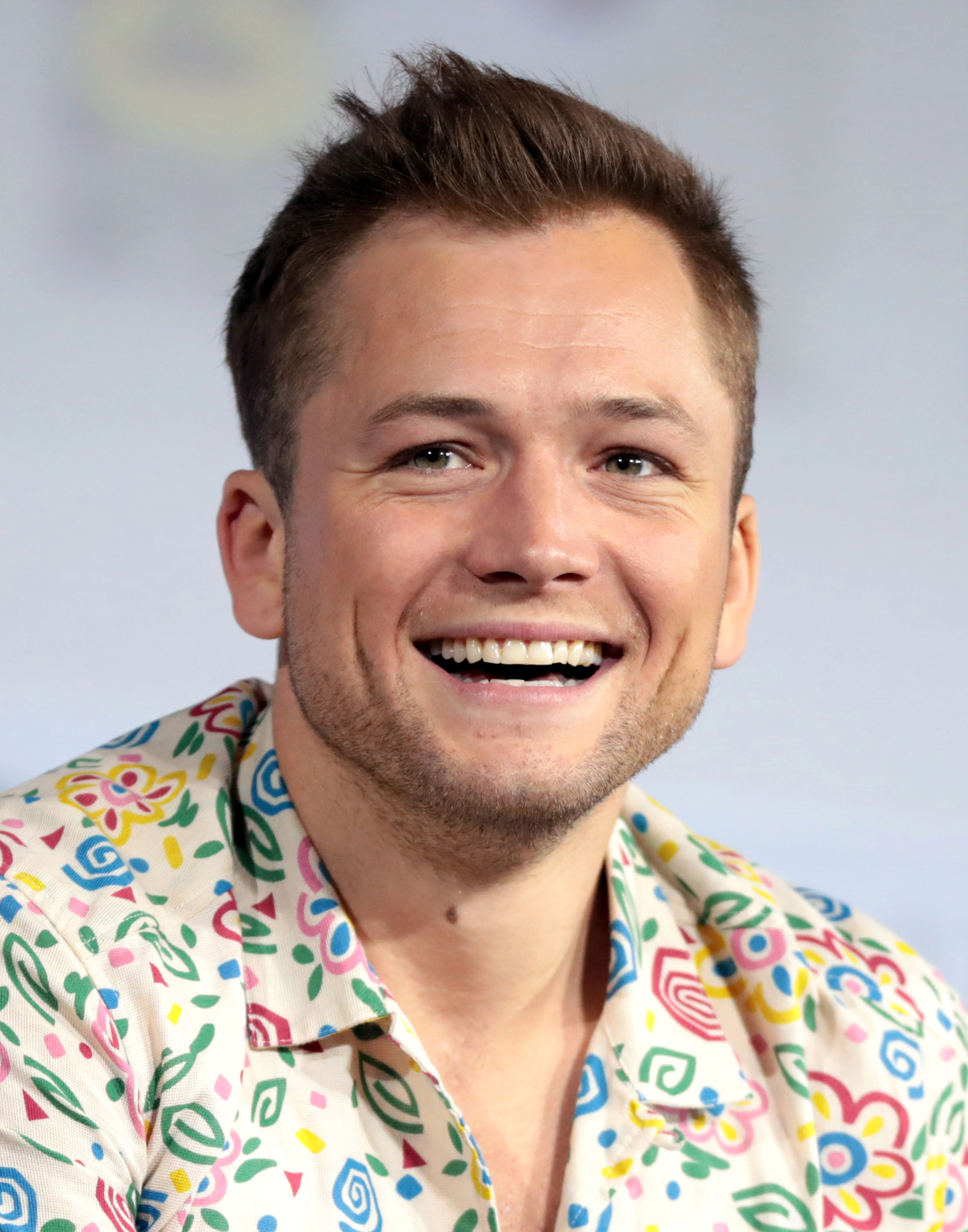
Taron Egerton won for Rocketman (2019)

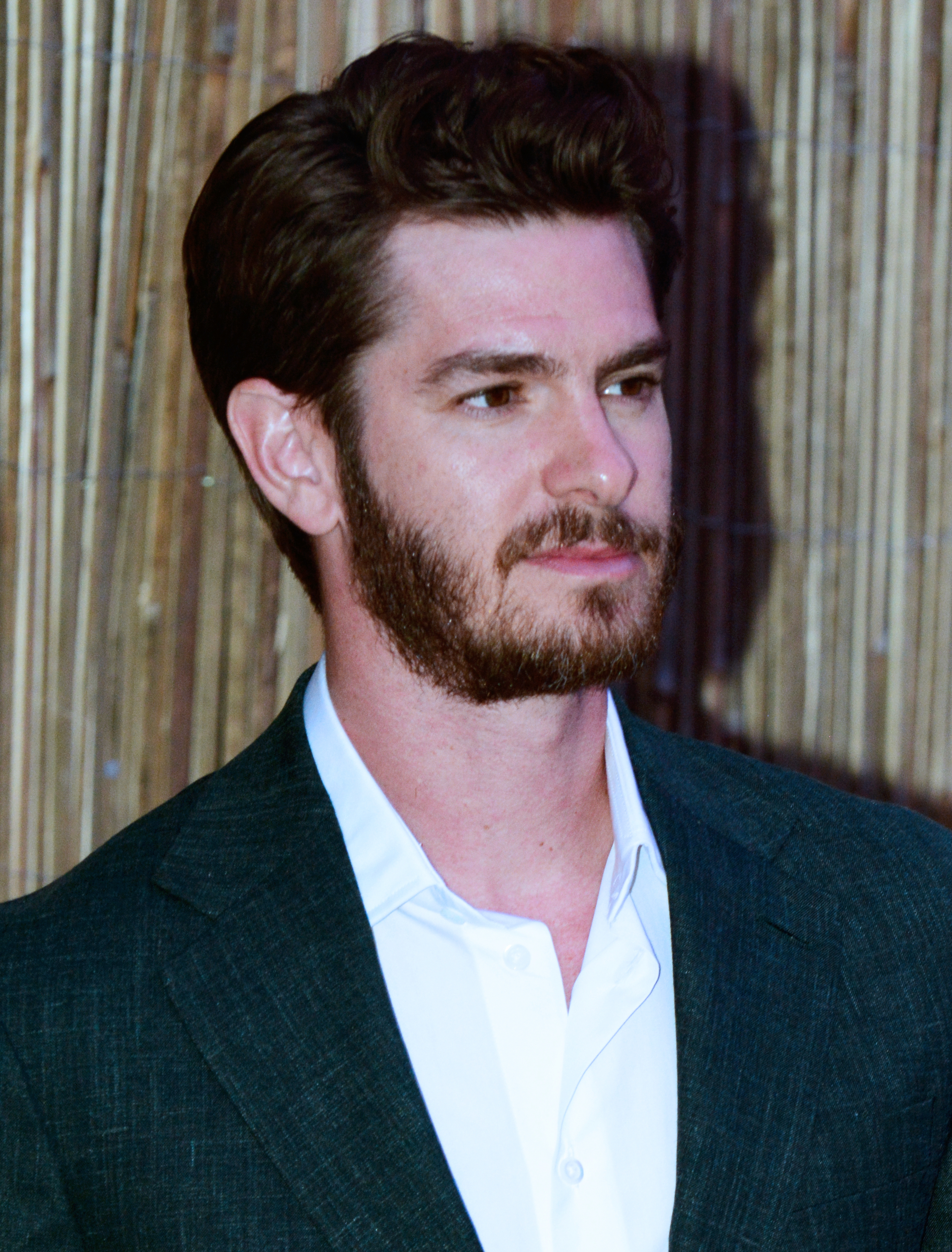
Andrew Garfield won for Tick, Tick... Boom! (2021)

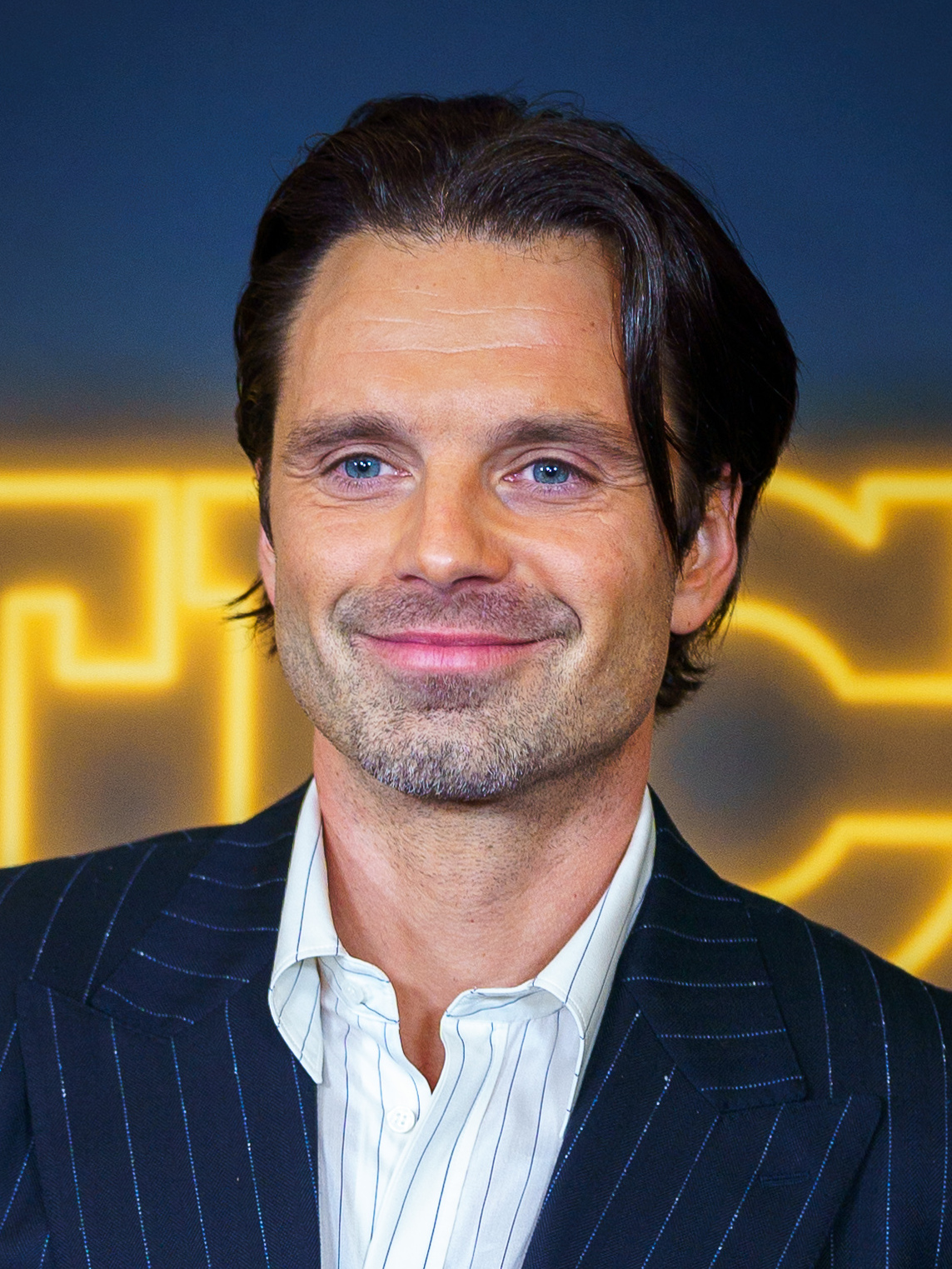
Sebastian Stan won for A Different Man (2024)

=== 1950s ===
Year	Actor	Role(s)	Film	Ref.
1950	Fred Astaire	Bert Kalmar	Three Little Words	
1951	Danny Kaye	Jack Martin / Henri Duran	On the Riviera	
1951	Gene Kelly	Jerry Mulligan	An American in Paris	
1952	Donald O'Connor	Cosmo Brown	Singin' in the Rain	
1953	David Niven	David Slater	The Moon Is Blue	
1954	James Mason	Norman Maine	A Star Is Born	
1955	Tom Ewell	Richard Sherman	The Seven Year Itch	
1956	Cantinflas	Passepartout	Around the World in 80 Days	
1956	Marlon Brando	Sakini	The Teahouse of the August Moon	
1956	Glenn Ford	Captain Fisby	The Teahouse of the August Moon	
1956	Yul Brynner	King Mongkut of Siam	The King and I	
1956	Danny Kaye	Hubert Hawkins	The Court Jester	
1957	Frank Sinatra	Joey Evans	Pal Joey	
1957	Maurice Chevalier	Claude Chavasse	Love in the Afternoon	
1957	Glenn Ford	Lt. J. G. Max Siegel	Don't Go Near the Water	
1957	David Niven	Godfrey Smith	My Man Godfrey	
1957	Tony Randall	Rockwell P. Hunter	Will Success Spoil Rock Hunter?	
1958	Danny Kaye	S. L. Jacobowsky	Me and the Colonel	
1958	Maurice Chevalier	Honoré Lachaille	Gigi	
1958	Louis Jourdan	Gaston Lachaille	Gigi	
1958	Clark Gable	James Gannon	Teacher's Pet	
1958	Cary Grant	Philip Adams	Indiscreet	
1959	Jack Lemmon	Jerry / Daphne	Some Like It Hot	
1959	Clark Gable	Russell Ward	But Not for Me	
1959	Cary Grant	Lt. Cmdr. Matt T. Sherman	Operation Petticoat	
1959	Dean Martin	Michael Haney	Who Was That Lady?	
1959	Sidney Poitier	Porgy	Porgy and Bess	

=== 1960s ===
Year	Actor	Role(s)	Film	Ref.
1960	Jack Lemmon	C. C. Baxter	The Apartment	
1960	Dirk Bogarde	Franz Liszt	Song Without End	
1960	Cantinflas	Pepe	Pepe	
1960	Cary Grant	Victor, Earl of Rhyall	The Grass Is Greener	
1960	Bob Hope	Larry Gilbert	The Facts of Life	
1961	Glenn Ford	Dave, the Dude	Pocketful of Miracles	
1961	Fred Astaire	Pogo Poole	The Pleasure of His Company	
1961	Richard Beymer	Tony	West Side Story	
1961	Bob Hope	Adam Niles	Bachelor in Paradise	
1961	Fred MacMurray	Ned Brainard	The Absent-Minded Professor	
1962	Marcello Mastroianni	Ferdinando Cefalù	Divorce Italian Style	
1962	Stephen Boyd	Sam Rawlins	Billy Rose's Jumbo	
1962	Jimmy Durante	Anthony Wonder / Pop	Billy Rose's Jumbo	
1962	Cary Grant	Philip Shayne	That Touch of Mink	
1962	Charlton Heston	Captain Paul MacDougall / Benny the Snatch / Narrator	The Pigeon That Took Rome	
1962	Karl Malden	Herbie Sommers	Gypsy	
1962	Robert Preston	Harold Hill	The Music Man	
1962	James Stewart	Roger Hobbs	Mr. Hobbs Takes a Vacation	
1963	Alberto Sordi	Amedeo Ferretti	To Bed or Not to Bed	
1963	Albert Finney	Tom Jones	Tom Jones	
1963	James Garner	Henry Tyroon	The Wheeler Dealers	
1963	Cary Grant	Brian Cruikshank	Charade	
1963	Jack Lemmon	Nestor Paptu / Lord X	Irma la Douce	
1963	Jack Lemmon	Mr. Hogan	Under the Yum Yum Tree	
1963	Frank Sinatra	Alan Barker	Come Blow Your Horn	
1963	Terry-Thomas	Spender	The Mouse on the Moon	
1963	Jonathan Winters	Lennie Pike	It's a Mad, Mad, Mad, Mad World	
1964	Rex Harrison	Henry Higgins	My Fair Lady	
1964	Marcello Mastroianni	Domenico Soriano	Marriage Italian-Style	
1964	Peter Sellers	Inspector Jacques Clouseau	The Pink Panther	
1964	Peter Ustinov	Arthur Simpson	Topkapi	
1964	Dick Van Dyke	Bert / Mr. Dawes Sr.	Mary Poppins	
1965	Lee Marvin	Kid Shelleen / Tim Strawn	Cat Ballou	
1965	Jack Lemmon	Professor Fate / Prince Hapnick	The Great Race	
1965	Jerry Lewis	Robert Reed	Boeing Boeing	
1965	Jason Robards	Murray Burns	A Thousand Clowns	
1965	Alberto Sordi	Count Emilio Ponticelli	Those Magnificent Men in their Flying Machines	
1966	Alan Arkin	Lt. Yuri Rozanov	The Russians Are Coming, the Russians Are Coming	
1966	Alan Bates	Jos Jones	Georgy Girl	
1966	Michael Caine	Harry Dean	Gambit	
1966	Lionel Jeffries	Stanley Farquhar	The Spy with a Cold Nose	
1966	Walter Matthau	Willie Gingrich	The Fortune Cookie	
1967	Richard Harris	King Arthur	Camelot	
1967	Richard Burton	Petruchio	The Taming of the Shrew	
1967	Rex Harrison	Doctor John Dolittle	Doctor Dolittle	
1967	Dustin Hoffman	Benjamin Braddock	The Graduate	
1967	Ugo Tognazzi	Sergio Masini	The Climax	
1968	Ron Moody	Fagin	Oliver!	
1968	Jack Lemmon	Felix Ungar	The Odd Couple	
1968	Walter Matthau	Oscar Madison	The Odd Couple	
1968	Fred Astaire	Finian McLonergan	Finian's Rainbow	
1968	Zero Mostel	Max Bialystock	The Producers	
1969	Peter O'Toole	Arthur Chipping	Goodbye, Mr. Chips	
1969	Dustin Hoffman	John	John and Mary	
1969	Lee Marvin	Ben Rumson	Paint Your Wagon	
1969	Steve McQueen	Boon Hogganbeck	The Reivers	
1969	Anthony Quinn	Italo Bombolini	The Secret of Santa Vittoria	

=== 1970s ===
Year	Actor	Role(s)	Film	Ref.
1970	Albert Finney	Ebenezer Scrooge	Scrooge	
1970	Elliott Gould	Captain John "Trapper" McIntyre	M*A*S*H	
1970	Donald Sutherland	Captain Benjamin "Hawkeye" Pierce	M*A*S*H	
1970	Richard Benjamin	Jonathan Balser	Diary of a Mad Housewife	
1970	Jack Lemmon	George Kellerman	The Out-of-Towners	
1971	Topol	Tevye	Fiddler on the Roof	
1971	Bud Cort	Harold Chasen	Harold and Maude	
1971	Dean Jones	Albert Dooley	The Million Dollar Duck	
1971	Walter Matthau	Joseph P. Kotcher	Kotch	
1971	Gene Wilder	Willy Wonka	Willy Wonka & the Chocolate Factory	
1972	Jack Lemmon	Wendell Armbruster	Avanti!	
1972	Edward Albert	Don Baker	Butterflies Are Free	
1972	Charles Grodin	Lenny Cantrow	The Heartbreak Kid	
1972	Walter Matthau	Pete	Pete 'n' Tillie	
1972	Peter O'Toole	Don Quixote de la Mancha / Miguel de Cervantes	Man of La Mancha	
1973	George Segal	Steve Blackburn	A Touch of Class	
1973	Carl Anderson	Judas Iscariot	Jesus Christ Superstar	
1973	Ted Neeley	Jesus Christ	Jesus Christ Superstar	
1973	Richard Dreyfuss	Curt Henderson	American Graffiti	
1973	Ryan O'Neal	Moses Pray	Paper Moon	
1974	Art Carney	Harry Coombes	Harry and Tonto	
1974	Jack Lemmon	Hildy Johnson	The Front Page	
1974	Walter Matthau	Walter Burns	The Front Page	
1974	James Earl Jones	Rupert Marshall	Claudine	
1974	Burt Reynolds	Paul "Wrecking" Crewe	The Longest Yard	
1975	George Burns	Al Lewis	The Sunshine Boys	
1975	Walter Matthau	Willy Clark	The Sunshine Boys	
1975	Warren Beatty	George Roundy	Shampoo	
1975	James Caan	Billy Rose	Funny Lady	
1975	Peter Sellers	Inspector Jacques Clouseau	The Return of the Pink Panther	
1976	Kris Kristofferson	John Howard	A Star Is Born	
1976	Mel Brooks	Mel Funn	Silent Movie	
1976	Peter Sellers	Inspector Jacques Clouseau	The Pink Panther Strikes Again	
1976	Jack Weston	Gaetano Proclo	The Ritz	
1976	Gene Wilder	George Caldwell	Silver Streak	
1977	Richard Dreyfuss	Elliott Garfield	The Goodbye Girl	
1977	Woody Allen	Alvy Singer	Annie Hall	
1977	Mel Brooks	Dr. Richard H. Thorndyke	High Anxiety	
1977	Robert De Niro	Jimmy Doyle	New York, New York	
1977	John Travolta	Tony Manero	Saturday Night Fever	
1978	Warren Beatty	Joe Pendleton	Heaven Can Wait	
1978	Alan Alda	George	Same Time, Next Year	
1978	Gary Busey	Buddy Holly	The Buddy Holly Story	
1978	Chevy Chase	Detective Tony Carlson	Foul Play	
1978	George C. Scott	Gloves Malloy / Spats Baxter	Movie Movie	
1978	John Travolta	Danny Zuko	Grease	
1979	Peter Sellers	Chance	Being There	
1979	George Hamilton	Count Dracula	Love at First Bite	
1979	Dudley Moore	George Webber	10	
1979	Burt Reynolds	Phil Potter	Starting Over	
1979	Roy Scheider	Joe Gideon	All That Jazz	

=== 1980s ===
Year	Actor	Role(s)	Film	Ref.
1980	Ray Sharkey	Vinnie Vacarri	The Idolmaker	
1980	Neil Diamond	Yussel Rabinovitch	The Jazz Singer	
1980	Tommy Lee Jones	Doolittle Mooney Lynn	Coal Miner's Daughter	
1980	Paul Le Mat	Melvin Dummar	Melvin and Howard	
1980	Walter Matthau	Miles Kendig	Hopscotch	
1981	Dudley Moore	Arthur Bach	Arthur	
1981	Alan Alda	Jack Burroughs	The Four Seasons	
1981	George Hamilton	Don Diego Vega / Zorro / Wigglesworth / Ramon Vega	Zorro, The Gay Blade	
1981	Steve Martin	Arthur Parker	Pennies from Heaven	
1981	Walter Matthau	Dan Snow	First Monday in October	
1982	Dustin Hoffman	Michael Dorsey / Dorothy Michaels	Tootsie	
1982	Peter O'Toole	Alan Swann	My Favorite Year	
1982	Al Pacino	Ivan Travalian	Author! Author!	
1982	Robert Preston	Caroll "Toddy" Todd	Victor Victoria	
1982	Henry Winkler	Chuck Lumley	Night Shift	
1983	Michael Caine	Frank Bryant	Educating Rita	
1983	Woody Allen	Leonard Zelig	Zelig	
1983	Tom Cruise	Joel Goodson	Risky Business	
1983	Eddie Murphy	Billy Ray Valentine	Trading Places	
1983	Mandy Patinkin	Avigdor	Yentl	
1984	Dudley Moore	Rob Salinger	Micki & Maude	
1984	Steve Martin	Roger Cobb	All of Me	
1984	Eddie Murphy	Axel Foley	Beverly Hills Cop	
1984	Bill Murray	Peter Venkman	Ghostbusters	
1984	Robin Williams	Vladimir Ivanoff	Moscow on the Hudson	
1985	Jack Nicholson	Charley Partanna	Prizzi's Honor	
1985	Jeff Daniels	Tom Baxter / Gil Sheperd	The Purple Rose of Cairo	
1985	Griffin Dunne	Paul Hackett	After Hours	
1985	Michael J. Fox	Marty McFly	Back to the Future	
1985	James Garner	Murphy Jones	Murphy's Romance	
1986	Paul Hogan	Michael J. "Crocodile" Dundee	Crocodile Dundee	
1986	Matthew Broderick	Ferris Bueller	Ferris Bueller's Day Off	
1986	Jeff Daniels	Charles Driggs	Something Wild	
1986	Danny DeVito	Sam Stone	Ruthless People	
1986	Jack Lemmon	Harvey Fairchild	That's Life!	
1987	Robin Williams	Adrian Cronauer	Good Morning, Vietnam	
1987	Nicolas Cage	Ronny Cammareri	Moonstruck	
1987	Danny DeVito	Owen Lift	Throw Momma from the Train	
1987	William Hurt	Tom Grunick	Broadcast News	
1987	Steve Martin	C. D. Bales	Roxanne	
1987	Patrick Swayze	Johnny Castle	Dirty Dancing	
1988	Tom Hanks	Josh Baskin	Big	
1988	Michael Caine	Lawrence Jamieson	Dirty Rotten Scoundrels	
1988	John Cleese	Archie Leach	A Fish Called Wanda	
1988	Robert De Niro	Jack Walsh	Midnight Run	
1988	Bob Hoskins	Eddie Valliant	Who Framed Roger Rabbit	
1989	Morgan Freeman	Hoke Colburn	Driving Miss Daisy	
1989	Billy Crystal	Harry Burns	When Harry Met Sally...	
1989	Michael Douglas	Oliver Rose	The War of the Roses	
1989	Steve Martin	Gil Buckman	Parenthood	
1989	Jack Nicholson	Jack Napier / The Joker	Batman	

=== 1990s ===
Year	Actor	Role(s)	Film	Ref.
1990	Gérard Depardieu	Georges Fauré	Green Card	
1990	Macaulay Culkin	Kevin McCallister	Home Alone	
1990	Johnny Depp	Edward Scissorhands	Edward Scissorhands	
1990	Richard Gere	Edward Lewis	Pretty Woman	
1990	Patrick Swayze	Sam Wheat	Ghost	
1991	Robin Williams	Henry "Parry" Sagan	The Fisher King	
1991	Jeff Bridges	Jack Lucas	The Fisher King	
1991	Billy Crystal	Mitch Robbins	City Slickers	
1991	Dustin Hoffman	Captain Hook	Hook	
1991	Kevin Kline	Jeffrey Anderson / Rod Randall	Soapdish	
1992	Tim Robbins	Griffin Mill	The Player	
1992	Nicolas Cage	Jack Singer	Honeymoon in Vegas	
1992	Billy Crystal	Buddy Young Jr.	Mr. Saturday Night	
1992	Marcello Mastroianni	Joe Meledandri	Used People	
1992	Tim Robbins	Bob Roberts	Bob Roberts	
1993	Robin Williams	Daniel Hillard / Mrs. Euphegenia Doubtfire	Mrs. Doubtfire	
1993	Johnny Depp	Sam	Benny & Joon	
1993	Tom Hanks	Sam Baldwin	Sleepless in Seattle	
1993	Kevin Kline	Dave Kovic / Bill Mitchell	Dave	
1993	Colm Meaney	Dessie Curley	The Snapper	
1994	Hugh Grant	Charles	Four Weddings and a Funeral	
1994	Jim Carrey	Stanley Ipkiss / The Mask	The Mask	
1994	Johnny Depp	Ed Wood	Ed Wood	
1994	Arnold Schwarzenegger	Alex Hesse	Junior	
1994	Terence Stamp	Ralph / Bernadette Bassenger	The Adventures of Priscilla, Queen of the Desert	
1995	John Travolta	Chili Palmer	Get Shorty	
1995	Michael Douglas	Andrew Shepherd	The American President	
1995	Harrison Ford	Linus Larrabee	Sabrina	
1995	Steve Martin	George Banks	Father of the Bride Part II	
1995	Patrick Swayze	Vida Boheme	To Wong Foo, Thanks for Everything! Julie Newmar	
1996	Tom Cruise	Jerry Maguire	Jerry Maguire	
1996	Antonio Banderas	Ché	Evita	
1996	Kevin Costner	Roy "Tin Cup" McAvoy	Tin Cup	
1996	Nathan Lane	Albert Goldman	The Birdcage	
1996	Eddie Murphy	Professor Sherman Klump / Buddy Love / Papa Klump / Mama Klump / Granny Klump / Ernie Klump / Lance Perkins	The Nutty Professor	
1997	Jack Nicholson	Melvin Udall	As Good as It Gets	
1997	Jim Carrey	Fletcher Reed	Liar Liar	
1997	Dustin Hoffman	Stanley Motss	Wag the Dog	
1997	Samuel L. Jackson	Ordell Robbie	Jackie Brown	
1997	Kevin Kline	Howard Brackett	In & Out	
1998	Michael Caine	Ray Say	Little Voice	
1998	Antonio Banderas	Alejandro Murrieta / Zorro	The Mask of Zorro	
1998	Warren Beatty	Senator Jay Billington Bulworth	Bulworth	
1998	John Travolta	Governor Jack Stanton	Primary Colors	
1998	Robin Williams	Dr. Hunter "Patch" Adams	Patch Adams	
1999	Jim Carrey	Andy Kaufman / Tony Clifton	Man on the Moon	
1999	Robert De Niro	Paul Vitti	Analyze This	
1999	Rupert Everett	Lord Arthur Goring	An Ideal Husband	
1999	Hugh Grant	William "Will" Thacker	Notting Hill	
1999	Sean Penn	Emmet Ray	Sweet and Lowdown	

=== 2000s ===
Year	Actor	Role(s)	Film	Ref.
2000	George Clooney	Ulysses Everett McGill	O Brother, Where Art Thou?	
2000	Jim Carrey	The Grinch	How the Grinch Stole Christmas	
2000	John Cusack	Rob Gordon	High Fidelity	
2000	Robert De Niro	Jack Byrnes	Meet the Parents	
2000	Mel Gibson	Nick Marshall	What Women Want	
2001	Gene Hackman	Royal Tenenbaum	The Royal Tenenbaums	
2001	Hugh Jackman	Leopold Hausmann	Kate & Leopold	
2001	Ewan McGregor	Christian	Moulin Rouge!	
2001	John Cameron Mitchell	Hedwig Robinson	Hedwig and the Angry Inch	
2001	Billy Bob Thornton	Terry Lee Collins	Bandits	
2002	Richard Gere	Billy Flynn	Chicago	
2002	Nicolas Cage	Charlie Kaufman / Donald Kaufman	Adaptation.	
2002	Kieran Culkin	Jason "Igby" Slocumb Jr.	Igby Goes Down	
2002	Hugh Grant	Will Freeman	About a Boy	
2002	Adam Sandler	Barry Egan	Punch-Drunk Love	
2003	Bill Murray	Bob Harris	Lost in Translation	
2003	Jack Black	Dewey Finn	School of Rock	
2003	Johnny Depp	Captain Jack Sparrow	Pirates of the Caribbean: The Curse of the Black Pearl	
2003	Jack Nicholson	Harry Sanborn	Something's Gotta Give	
2003	Billy Bob Thornton	Willie T. Stokes	Bad Santa	
2004	Jamie Foxx	Ray Charles	Ray	
2004	Jim Carrey	Joel Barish	Eternal Sunshine of the Spotless Mind	
2004	Paul Giamatti	Miles Raymond	Sideways	
2004	Kevin Kline	Cole Porter	De-Lovely	
2004	Kevin Spacey	Bobby Darin	Beyond the Sea	
2005	Joaquin Phoenix	Johnny Cash	Walk the Line	
2005	Pierce Brosnan	Julian Noble	The Matador	
2005	Jeff Daniels	Bernard Berkman	The Squid and the Whale	
2005	Johnny Depp	Willy Wonka	Charlie and the Chocolate Factory	
2005	Nathan Lane	Max Bialystock	The Producers	
2005	Cillian Murphy	Patrick "Kitten" Braden	Breakfast on Pluto	
2006	Sacha Baron Cohen	Borat Sagdiyev	Borat	
2006	Johnny Depp	Captain Jack Sparrow	Pirates of the Caribbean: Dead Man's Chest	
2006	Aaron Eckhart	Nick Naylor	Thank You for Smoking	
2006	Chiwetel Ejiofor	Lola Carter	Kinky Boots	
2006	Will Ferrell	Harold Crick	Stranger than Fiction	
2007	Johnny Depp	Sweeney Todd / Benjamin Barker	Sweeney Todd: The Demon Barber of Fleet Street	
2007	Ryan Gosling	Lars Lindstrom	Lars and the Real Girl	
2007	Tom Hanks	Charlie Wilson	Charlie Wilson's War	
2007	Philip Seymour Hoffman	Jon Savage	The Savages	
2007	John C. Reilly	Dewey Cox	Walk Hard: The Dewey Cox Story	
2008	Colin Farrell	Ray	In Bruges	
2008	Javier Bardem	Juan Antonio	Vicky Cristina Barcelona	
2008	James Franco	Saul Silver	Pineapple Express	
2008	Brendan Gleeson	Ken Daley	In Bruges	
2008	Dustin Hoffman	Harvey Shine	Last Chance Harvey	
2009	Robert Downey Jr.	Sherlock Holmes	Sherlock Holmes	
2009	Matt Damon	Mark Whitacre	The Informant!	
2009	Daniel Day-Lewis	Guido Contini	Nine	
2009	Joseph Gordon-Levitt	Tom Hansen	(500) Days of Summer	
2009	Michael Stuhlbarg	Larry Gopnik	A Serious Man	

=== 2010s ===
Year	Actor	Role(s)	Film	Ref.
2010	Paul Giamatti	Barney Panofsky	Barney's Version	
2010	Johnny Depp	The Mad Hatter	Alice in Wonderland	
2010	Johnny Depp	Frank Tupelo	The Tourist	
2010	Jake Gyllenhaal	Jamie Randall	Love & Other Drugs	
2010	Kevin Spacey	Jack Abramoff	Casino Jack	
2011	Jean Dujardin	George Valentin	The Artist	
2011	Brendan Gleeson	Sgt. Gerry Boyle	The Guard	
2011	Joseph Gordon-Levitt	Adam Lerner	50/50	
2011	Ryan Gosling	Jacob Palmer	Crazy, Stupid, Love.	
2011	Owen Wilson	Gil Pender	Midnight in Paris	
2012	Hugh Jackman	Jean Valjean	Les Misérables	
2012	Jack Black	Bernie Tiede	Bernie	
2012	Bradley Cooper	Patrizio "Pat" Solitano Jr.	Silver Linings Playbook	
2012	Ewan McGregor	Dr. Alfred Jones	Salmon Fishing in the Yemen	
2012	Bill Murray	Franklin D. Roosevelt	Hyde Park on Hudson	
2013	Leonardo DiCaprio	Jordan Belfort	The Wolf of Wall Street	
2013	Christian Bale	Irving Rosenfeld	American Hustle	
2013	Bruce Dern	Woodrow "Woody" Grant	Nebraska	
2013	Oscar Isaac	Llewyn Davis	Inside Llewyn Davis	
2013	Joaquin Phoenix	Theodore Twombly	Her	
2014	Michael Keaton	Riggan Thomson	Birdman	
2014	Ralph Fiennes	Monsieur Gustave H.	The Grand Budapest Hotel	
2014	Bill Murray	Vincent MacKenna	St. Vincent	
2014	Joaquin Phoenix	Larry "Doc" Sportello	Inherent Vice	
2014	Christoph Waltz	Walter Keane	Big Eyes	
2015	Matt Damon	Mark Watney	The Martian	
2015	Christian Bale	Michael Burry	The Big Short	
2015	Steve Carell	Mark Baum	The Big Short	
2015	Al Pacino	Danny Collins	Danny Collins	
2015	Mark Ruffalo	Cameron Stuart	Infinitely Polar Bear	
2016	Ryan Gosling	Sebastian Wilder	La La Land	
2016	Colin Farrell	David Matthews	The Lobster	
2016	Hugh Grant	St. Clair Bayfield	Florence Foster Jenkins	
2016	Jonah Hill	Efraim Diveroli	War Dogs	
2016	Ryan Reynolds	Wade Wilson / Deadpool	Deadpool	
2017	James Franco	Tommy Wiseau	The Disaster Artist	
2017	Steve Carell	Bobby Riggs	Battle of the Sexes	
2017	Ansel Elgort	Miles "Baby"	Baby Driver	
2017	Hugh Jackman	P. T. Barnum	The Greatest Showman	
2017	Daniel Kaluuya	Chris Washington	Get Out	
2018	Christian Bale	Dick Cheney	Vice	
2018	Lin-Manuel Miranda	Jack	Mary Poppins Returns	
2018	Viggo Mortensen	Frank "Tony Lip" Vallelonga	Green Book	
2018	Robert Redford	Forrest Tucker	The Old Man & the Gun	
2018	John C. Reilly	Oliver Hardy	Stan & Ollie	
2019	Taron Egerton	Elton John	Rocketman	
2019	Daniel Craig	Benoit Blanc	Knives Out	
2019	Roman Griffin Davis	Johannes "Jojo" Betzler	Jojo Rabbit	
2019	Leonardo DiCaprio	Rick Dalton	Once Upon a Time in Hollywood	
2019	Eddie Murphy	Rudy Ray Moore	Dolemite Is My Name	

=== 2020s ===
Year	Actor	Role(s)	Film	Ref.
2020	Sacha Baron Cohen	Borat Sagdiyev	Borat Subsequent Moviefilm	
2020	James Corden	Barry Glickman	The Prom	
2020	Lin-Manuel Miranda	Alexander Hamilton	Hamilton	
2020	Dev Patel	David Copperfield	The Personal History of David Copperfield	
2020	Andy Samberg	Nyles	Palm Springs	
2021	Andrew Garfield	Jonathan Larson	Tick, Tick... Boom!	
2021	Leonardo DiCaprio	Randall Mindy	Don't Look Up	
2021	Peter Dinklage	Cyrano de Bergerac	Cyrano	
2021	Cooper Hoffman	Gary Valentine	Licorice Pizza	
2021	Anthony Ramos	Usnavi de la Vega	In the Heights	
2022	Colin Farrell	Pádraic Súilleabháin	The Banshees of Inisherin	
2022	Diego Calva	Manny Torres	Babylon	
2022	Daniel Craig	Benoit Blanc	Glass Onion: A Knives Out Mystery	
2022	Adam Driver	Jack Gladney	White Noise	
2022	Ralph Fiennes	Julian Slowik	The Menu	
2023	Paul Giamatti	Paul Hunham	The Holdovers	
2023	Nicolas Cage	Dr. Paul Matthews	Dream Scenario	
2023	Timothée Chalamet	Willy Wonka	Wonka	
2023	Matt Damon	Sonny Vaccaro	Air	
2023	Joaquin Phoenix	Beau Wasserman	Beau Is Afraid	
2023	Jeffrey Wright	Thelonious "Monk" Ellis	American Fiction	
2024	Sebastian Stan	Edward Lemuel / Guy Moratz	A Different Man	
2024	Jesse Eisenberg	David Kaplan	A Real Pain	
2024	Hugh Grant	Mr. Reed	Heretic	
2024	Gabriel LaBelle	Lorne Michaels	Saturday Night	
2024	Jesse Plemons	Robert Fletcher / Daniel / Andrew	Kinds of Kindness	
2024	Glen Powell	Gary Johnson	Hit Man	
2025	Timothée Chalamet	Marty Mauser	Marty Supreme	
2025	George Clooney	Jay Kelly	Jay Kelly	
2025	Leonardo DiCaprio	Bob Ferguson	One Battle After Another	
2025	Ethan Hawke	Lorenz Hart	Blue Moon	
2025	Lee Byung-hun	Yoo Man-soo	No Other Choice	
2025	Jesse Plemons	Teddy Gatz	Bugonia	

== Multiple wins and nominations ==
=== Multiple wins ===
Wins	Actor
3	Jack Lemmon (Note: Won the award in consecutive years)
3	Robin Williams
2	Michael Caine
2	Colin Farrell
2	Paul Giamatti
2	Danny Kaye
2	Dudley Moore
2	Jack Nicholson
2	Sacha Baron Cohen (Note: Won the award for playing the same character)

=== Multiple nominations ===
Nominations	Actor
10	Jack Lemmon
9	Johnny Depp
8	Walter Matthau
6	Dustin Hoffman
5	Jim Carrey
5	Cary Grant
5	Hugh Grant
5	Steve Martin
5	Robin Williams
4	Nicolas Cage
4	Michael Caine
4	Robert De Niro
4	Leonardo DiCaprio
4	Danny Kaye
4	Kevin Kline
4	Eddie Murphy
4	Bill Murray
4	Jack Nicholson
4	Peter O'Toole
4	Joaquin Phoenix
4	Peter Sellers
4	John Travolta
3	Christian Bale
3	Warren Beatty
3	Billy Crystal
3	Matt Damon
3	Jeff Daniels
3	Colin Farrell
3	Albert Finney
3	Paul Giamatti
3	Ryan Gosling
3	Tom Hanks
3	Bob Hope
3	Hugh Jackman
3	Marcello Mastroianni
3	Dudley Moore
3	Patrick Swayze
3	Glenn Ford
2	Alan Alda
2	Woody Allen
2	Fred Astaire
2	Antonio Banderas
2	Sacha Baron Cohen
2	Jack Black
2	Mel Brooks
2	Steve Carell
2	Timothée Chalamet
2	George Clooney
2	Daniel Craig
2	Bing Crosby
2	Tom Cruise
2	Danny DeVito
2	Michael Douglas
2	Richard Dreyfuss
2	Ralph Fiennes
2	James Franco
2	Clark Gable
2	James Garner
2	Richard Gere
2	Brendan Gleeson
2	Joseph Gordon-Levitt
2	Charles Grodin
2	George Hamilton
2	Rex Harrison
2	Charlton Heston
2	Nathan Lane
2	Harold Lloyd
2	Lee Marvin
2	Lin-Manuel Miranda
2	James Mason
2	Ewan McGregor
2	David Niven
2	Al Pacino
2	Jesse Plemons
2	Robert Preston
2	John C. Reilly
2	Burt Reynolds
2	Tim Robbins
2	Alberto Sordi
2	Kevin Spacey
2	Billy Bob Thornton
2	Gene Wilder

== Multiple character nominations ==
Winners are in bold.

- Inspector Jacques Clouseau from The Pink Panther (Peter Sellers, 1963), The Return of the Pink Panther (Peter Sellers, 1975), and The Pink Panther Strikes Again (Peter Sellers, 1976)
- Willy Wonka from Willy Wonka & the Chocolate Factory (Gene Wilder, 1971), Charlie and the Chocolate Factory (Johnny Depp, 2005), and Wonka (Timothée Chalamet, 2023)
- Benoit Blanc from Knives Out (Daniel Craig, 2019) and Glass Onion: A Knives Out Mystery (Daniel Craig, 2022)

== Firsts ==
- Cantinflas became the first Latino as well as the first Mexican actor to win in 1957.
- Marcello Mastroianni became the first actor to win for a foreign language/non-English language performance in 1963.
- Topol became the first actor of Asian descent to win in 1972.
- Morgan Freeman became the first actor of African descent to win in 1990.
- Sacha Baron Cohen became the first actor to win for playing the same character (Borat Sagdiyev) twice in 2006 and 2021.

== See also ==
- Academy Award for Best Actor
- Actor Award for Outstanding Performance by a Male Actor in a Leading Role
- BAFTA Award for Best Actor in a Leading Role
- Critics' Choice Movie Award for Best Actor
- Critics' Choice Movie Award for Best Actor in a Comedy
- Golden Globe Award for Best Actor in a Motion Picture – Drama
- Independent Spirit Award for Best Lead Performance
