= Nigel Odell =

Australian film producer

Nigel Odell is an Australian film producer. He was a lecturer at the University of Melbourne. He is known for collaborations with Paul Hogan.

== Filmography ==
- Funny Man, (1994)
- Green Money, (1998, short)
- Muggers, (2000)
- The Upstairs Neighbour, (2002, short, executive)
- Till Human Voices Wake Us, (2002)
- Strange Bedfellows, (2004)
- Long Weekend, (2008)
- Torn, (2010, executive)
- Cliffy, (2013)
- That's Not My Dog!, (2018, executive)
- The Very Excellent Mr. Dundee, (2020)
