= Andrew Mackie (producer) =

Australian film distributor, producer and author

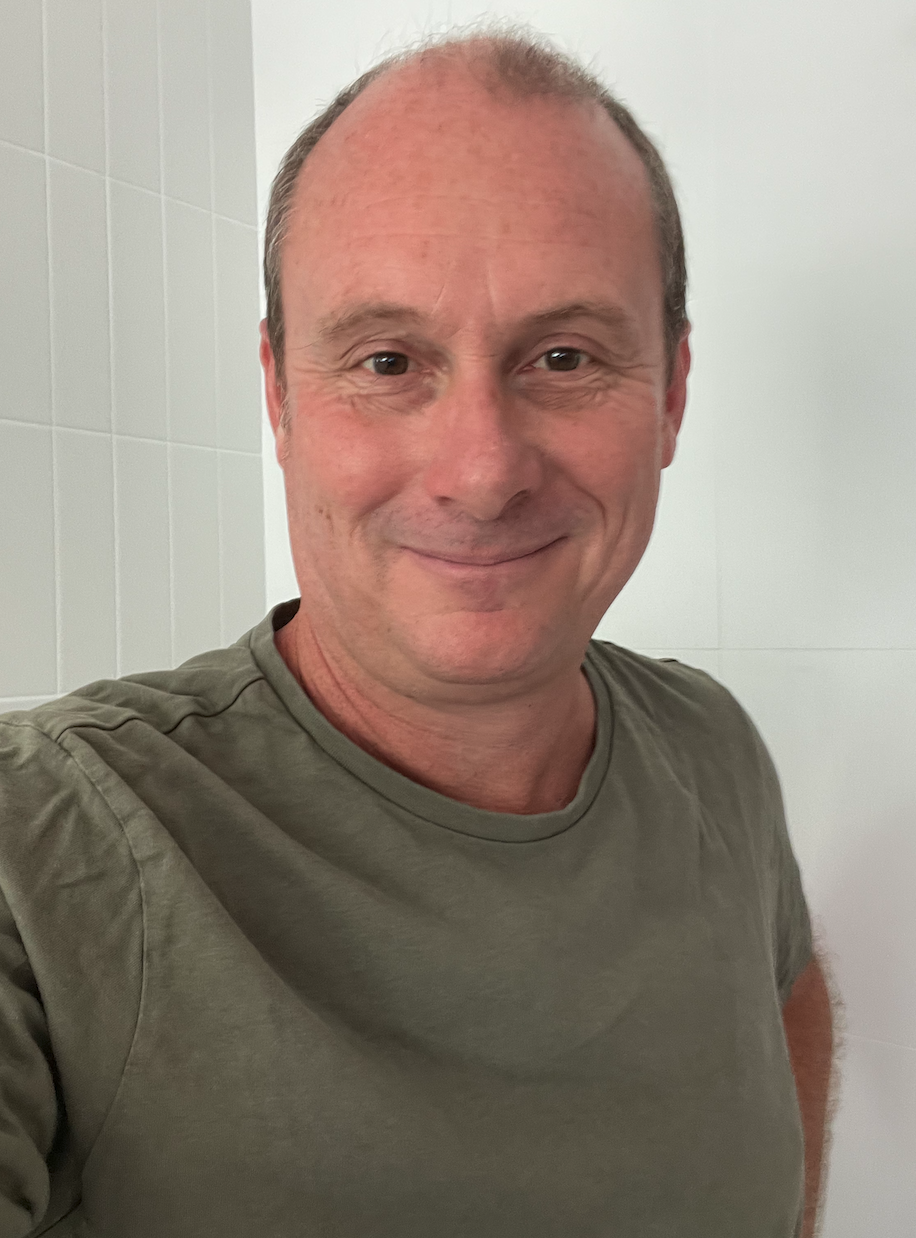
- Occupations: Film distributor, producer, author
- Years active: 2008–present
- Website: https://www.andrewmackie.com

Andrew Mackie is an Australian film distributor, producer and author. He is a co-founder of Australian film distribution company Transmission Films along with Richard Payten.

== Career ==
Mackie founded the Australian film distribution company Transmission Films with Richard Payten in 2008. Prior to Transmission Mackie and Payten were joint general managers of Dendy Films and The Globe Film Co. He and Payten have released over 180 films generating over $400 million at the box office. Films Mackie has acquired and distributed have won 9 Palme d’Ors, been nominated for 51 Academy Awards and received over 220 AACTA nominations. As a film distributor he has released films such as The King's Speech, Lion, Amour, Samson & Delilah, The Railway Man, Calvary, Shame, Ride Like A Girl and many more.

As a producer he has executive produced a number of films including Ride Like A Girl directed by Rachel Griffiths, Holding the Man directed by Neil Armfield, Mary & Max directed by Adam Elliot, Candy directed by Neil Armfield, The Eye of the Storm directed by Fred Schepisi, Tracks directed by John Curran, the UK/Australian co-production Oyster Farmer directed by Anna Reeves, On Chesil Beach directed by Dominic Cooke, Sweet Country directed by Warwick Thornton and Strangerland directed by Kim Farrant starring Nicole Kidman.

Mackie and Payten were also founding partners in See-Saw Films, the Oscar-winning UK/Australian production company behind The King's Speech and Shame.

In 2012 and 2013, The Australian, an Australian newspaper named Andrew Mackie as one of the most influential people in the Australian arts. In 2003 Mackie was named as one of The Hollywood Reporter's Next Gen Under 35 executives.

Mackie is a current board member of Screen Canberra and the Adelaide Film Festival.

In 2021 his first novel, The Tour, was published by Penguin Random House Australia.

== Filmography ==
=== As Executive Producer ===
- Juniper (2021)
- Six Minutes to Midnight (2021)
- The Very Excellent Mr Dundee (2020)
- Ride Like A Girl (2019)
- That's Not My Dog! (2018)
- On Chesil Beach (2017)
- Sweet Country (2017)
- David Stratton's Stories of Australian Cinema (2017)
- Lion: The Journey Home (2017)
- One Thousand Ropes (2016)
- Whiteley (2017)
- Holding the Man (2015)
- Strangerland (2015)
- Tracks (2013)
- The Eye of the Storm (2011)
- Charlie & Boots (2009)
- Mary and Max (2009)
- Candy (2006)
- Oyster Farmer (2004)

=== As Film Distributor ===
- The King's Speech
- Lion
- Ride Like a Girl
- The Nightingale
- I Am Woman
- Danger Close
- Ammonite
- Tea With The Dames
- Red Joan
- Viceroy's House
- Top of the Lake
- Last Flag Flying
- Suspiria
- At Eternity's Gate
- Collette
- The True History of the Kelly Gang
- Military Wives
- The Book Shop
- Book Club
- Amour
- Samson & Delilah
- The Railway Man
- Calvary
- Shame
- Tracks
- Mr. Turner
- Holding the Man
- Suffragette
- Carol
- Brooklyn
- Boy
- The Painted Veil
- Quartet
- Beneath Hill 60
- An Education
- Mr. Holmes
- Le Week-End
- Blue is the Warmest Colour
- 20 Feet From Stardom
- Control
- The White Ribbon
- Charlie & Boots
- Antichrist
- The World's Fastest Indian
- Good Night And Good Luck
- The Guard
- Volver
- Secrets & Lies
- Swimming Pool
- Fish Tank
- Super Size Me
- Rabbit Proof Fence
