= Hanging with Hoges =

2014 film

- Directed by: Dean Murphy
- Starring: Paul Hogan
- Country of origin: Australia
- Original language: English

Production
- Running time: 60 minutes

Original release
- Network: Australian Broadcasting Corporation
- Release: December 2014

Hanging with Hoges is a 2014 one-hour documentary about Paul Hogan hosted by Shane Jacobson. He talks about his success with Crocodile Dundee, his family life, and his battles with the Australian Taxation Office. It also shows excerpts from this live stage show.

Hogan agreed to make it because of his relationship with Jacobson and producer/director Dean Murphy; the three men had made Charlie and Boots together.

It aired on the ABC in December 2014.
