= The Very Excellent Mr. Dundee =

2020 film directed by Dean Murphy

- Theatrical release poster
- Directed by: Dean Murphy
- Written by: Robert Mond; Dean Murphy
- Produced by: Nigel Odell; Dean Murphy
- Starring: Paul Hogan; Rachael Carpani; Jacob Elordi; Charlotte Stent; Nate Torrence; Chevy Chase; John Cleese; Olivia Newton-John; Reginald VelJohnson; Shane Jacobson; Wayne Knight; Kerry Armstrong
- Cinematography: Roger Lanser
- Edited by: Peter Carrodus; Robert Mond
- Music by: John Foreman
- Production companies: Clock Sounds Productions Pty; Kathy Morgan International; Piccadilly Pictures; Salt Media & Entertainment
- Distributed by: Transmission Films
- Release date: 17 July 2020
- Running time: 88 minutes
- Countries: Australia; United States
- Language: English

The Very Excellent Mr. Dundee is a 2020 Australian comedy film directed by Dean Murphy, written by Robert Mond and Dean Murphy, and starring Paul Hogan, Rachael Carpani, Jacob Elordi, Charlotte Stent, Nate Torrence, Chevy Chase, John Cleese, Olivia Newton-John, Reginald VelJohnson, Shane Jacobson, Wayne Knight and Kerry Armstrong.

Paul Hogan is reluctantly thrust back into the spotlight as he desperately attempts to restore his sullied reputation on the eve of being knighted. The title pays homage to Hogan's famous role of Crocodile Dundee.

It was released on Amazon Prime Video on 17 July 2020, and was the final film Olivia Newton-John starred in before her death in 2022.

== Plot ==
Aussie Paul Hogan (of Crocodile Dundee), has been happily retired in Brentwood, California for decades. He is reluctantly thrust back into the public spotlight by his agent, who tells him the Queen wants to honour him with a knighthood for his services to comedy.

Paul attends a meeting with a young, modern production company that would like to do a reboot of Crocodile Dundee, by introducing Will Smith as his son. When he points out the obvious, that the actor being African-American isn't logical as both he and his screen partner are Caucasian, they label him a racist.

Paul attempts to return to his tranquil life at home, living with his son Chase, doing the daily crossword, spending time with his dog and enjoying regular calls from his 10-year-old granddaughter Lucy in Sydney.

Walking through Hollywood studio lots, Paul meets up with his long-time friend Reggie and explains how the production studio was quick to label him as a racist over his disapproval of casting Smith. They run into fellow Aussie Olivia Newton-John, who invites him to a charity event on the following Wednesday where John Travolta is meant to do a Grease duet with her.

On the way home, not liking the behavior of an ill-mannered Dundee impersonator on Hollywood Boulevard, Paul calls him out for it. In retaliation the man sics his costumed kids on him. Many snap pictures, which are broadcast on the TV news, portray him as the aggressor.

Paul insists he's not interested in the knighthood so, much to his agents' chagrin, turns down the offer. However, no sooner does she cancel it, but Lucy calls; she has excitedly told kids at her new school that her granddad has been offered a knighthood. They didn't believe her and laughed at her. So, Paul realises he needs to get the knighthood to help salvage her reputation. He does much begging and pleading, his agent reluctantly agrees to contact the Palace and gets the Knighthood back on.

Although Paul is always trying to do the right thing and salvage his quickly diminishing reputation, he keeps on being misunderstood and it seems as if life is conspiring against him. On his way to Olivia's Grease charity event, where he has to step in for no-show John Travolta and sing a duet with her, not only does he wrongly almost enter a black performers' event but also enrages the die-hard Grease fans. One of them throws a bottle at him, which he throws back, inadvertently knocking out a nun.

The media broadcasts story after story, all negative headlines about Paul. Paul's simple life becomes limiting to the point of no longer being able to go into public without drawing controversy.

Paul finds himself in a car with a mediocre paparazzi photographer with John Cleese, a most unexpected Uber driver. John ends up running from the law, as he doesn't have a driver's license nor owns the car. He dumps them at Paul's, abandons the car, and leaves. The chase is televised, and the police tackling Paul and the photographer is shown live.

Paul manages to restore his sullied reputation on the eve of being knighted by foiling a car thief. His agent goes to England without him, accepting the knighthood on his behalf. Paul has moved out of his LA home and returned to Australia to be near his granddaughter and has started seeing a friend of Olivia's.

== Cast ==
- Paul Hogan as Paul
- Jacob Elordi as Chase, Paul's son
- Chevy Chase as Chevy
- John Cleese as John
- Olivia Newton-John as Olivia
- Reginald VelJohnson as Reggie
- Wayne Knight as Wayne
- Rachael Carpani as Angie
- Nate Torrence as Luke
- Paul Fenech as Paul's Mexican Landscaper
- Shane Jacobson as Neville Dundee
- Kerry Armstrong as Ella, Paul's date
- Julia Morris as Carol Knight
- John O'May as Earl of Spencer
- Paul Henri as Gordon
- Charlotte Stent as Lucy
- Graham Tate as Graham
- Mark Ellis as Mark
- Rob Carlton as Father
- Betty Bobbitt as Betty
- Jessica Gower as Eve

== Production ==
Filming took place in Melbourne, Victoria, Australia and Los Angeles, California, USA in 2018.

== Release ==
The film was originally scheduled to be released in Australian cinemas on 30 April 2020, but had its theatrical release cancelled due to the COVID-19 pandemic.

The Very Excellent Mr. Dundee was released exclusively on Amazon Prime Video on 17 July the same year.

== Reception ==
This new film has been summarized by Penelope DeBelle in Adelaide Now as "the latest in a long line of old man movies... Crocodile Dundee was 34 years ago, followed two years later by Crocodile Dundee II. Not even surgical uplifts and impeccable veneers can alter the fact that Hogan is now 80 years old. ...the idea of Hogan trying to revive the warmth and affection we had for his younger self seems a forlorn hope, just as casting a creaky Harrison Ford as a man living off the land seems an unnecessary stretch."

The film mostly received negative reviews, with one and two-star reviews from ArtsHub, Screenspace, The Sydney Morning Herald and The Guardian. The Australian newspaper's Stephen Romei gave it one star: "The kindest comment I can make about Paul Hogan's new movie, The Very Excellent Mr Dundee, is that it includes John Cleese's worst performance ever (and, yes, I have seen Fierce Creatures from 1997)."

On the review aggregator website Rotten Tomatoes, 18% of 22 critics' reviews are positive. Metacritic, which uses a weighted average, assigned the film a score of 24 out of 100, based on four critics, indicating "generally unfavorable" reviews.

=== Accolades ===
Award	Category	Recipient(s)	Result	Ref.
Golden Raspberry Awards	Worst Supporting Actor	Chevy Chase	Nominated	

== See also ==
- Cinema of Australia
