= Death of Tina Watson =

Diving death under suspicious circumstances in 2003

- Date: 22 October 2003
- Time: 11:27 a.m. (AEST; UTC+10:00)
- Location: Yongala wreck Great Barrier Reef Townsville, Queensland Australia; 19°18′27″S 147°37′31″E
- Participants: Tina Watson and Gabe Watson
- Outcome: Death by drowning
- Deaths: Tina Watson
- Burial: Southern Heritage Cemetery, Pelham, Alabama, U.S.
- Inquest: Townsville
- Coroner: David Robert Glasgow
- Suspects: Gabe Watson
- Charges: Murder
- Convictions: Manslaughter (Australia)

Tina Watson was a 26-year-old American woman from Helena, Alabama, who died while scuba diving in Queensland, Australia, on 22 October 2003. Tina had been on her honeymoon with her husband, Gabe Watson, who was initially charged by Queensland authorities with his wife's murder. Watson pleaded guilty to manslaughter and was sentenced to a term of imprisonment.

Evidence presented at the trial included Watson's differing accounts of what had happened on that day, of the couple's diving experience (or lack thereof), and of Tina's life insurance. While Watson was serving his term in Australia, authorities in Alabama flagged an intention to charge him with murder at a later date. After his release, he was deported to Alabama on the condition that he would not be sentenced to death if found guilty of murder. Watson was then put on trial, but on 23 February 2012, Judge Tommy Nail dismissed the murder case due to lack of evidence.

== Background ==
Christina Mae "Tina" Watson (née Thomas) was born in West Germany on 13 February 1977, before relocating to the U.S. while still a baby. On 24 January 1980, she was legally adopted by Tommy and Cindy Thomas. They lived in Walker County, Alabama, with her younger sister before moving to Louisiana then Birmingham. David Gabriel "Gabe" Watson met Tina while they were students at the University of Alabama at Birmingham, and they began dating in January 2001.

Despite an earlier diagnosis of paroxysmal supraventricular tachycardia (PSVT), Tina began diving lessons in January 2003, and earned her certification just before her wedding to Watson on 11 October 2003. Watson was purportedly a qualified certified rescue diver, with experience in the lake at Oak Mountain State Park. Watson had completed 55 dives by the time of their marriage, and Tina 5. The couple had planned a scuba trip in the Great Barrier Reef for their honeymoon, and flew to Sydney for a week before heading to Townsville. They chose to dive the popular yet difficult wreck of SS Yongala, a passenger ship that sank in 1911, even though Watson had limited open ocean experience and Tina had never dived in the ocean or below 9 metres. The dive company had also offered an orientation and guided dive with a dive master, which the couple had refused.

== Incident ==
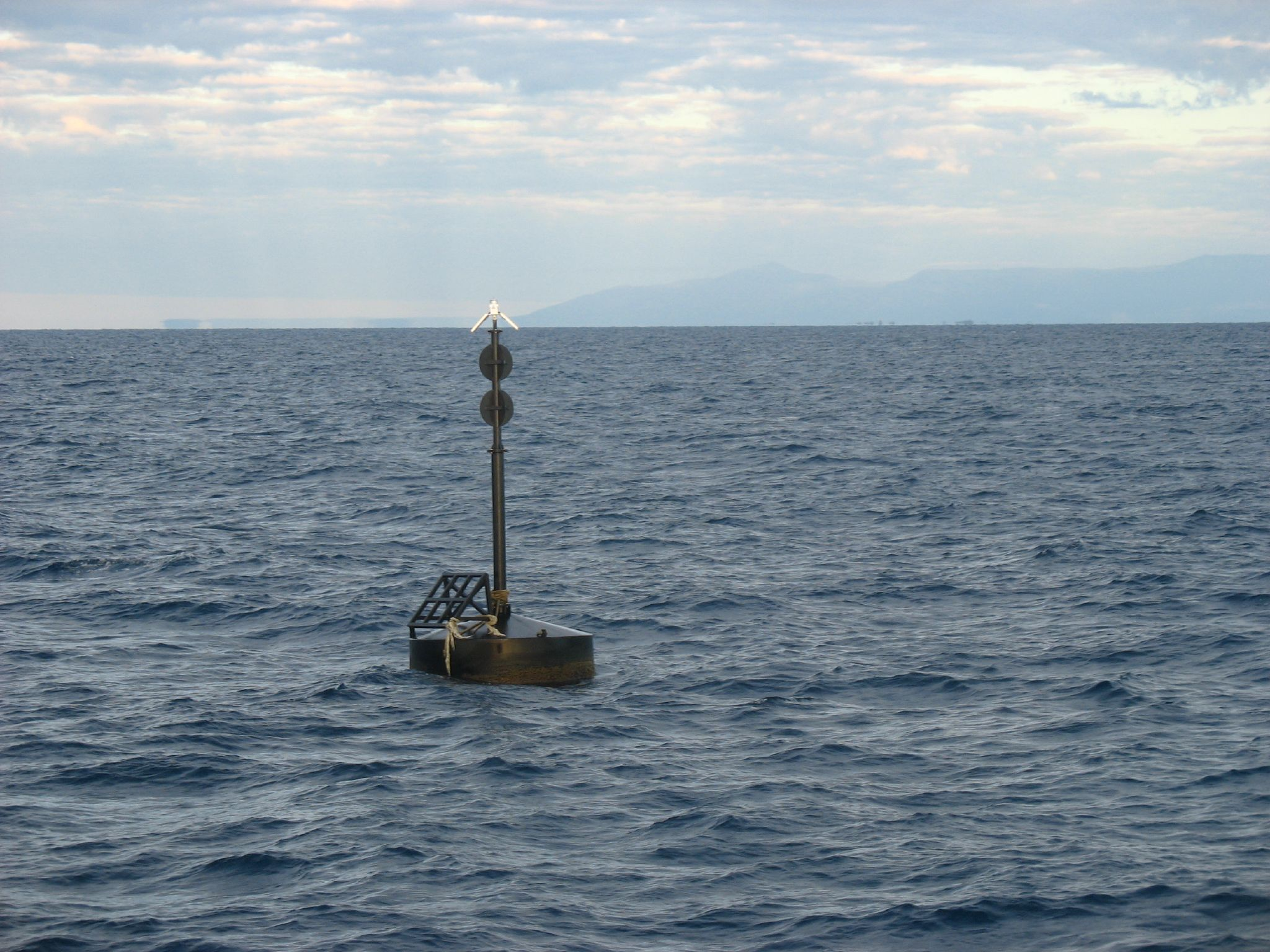
A buoy marks the site of the SS Yongala

At around 10:30 am on 22 October, during an excursion from the dive boat Spoilsport to the site of Yongala, Tina lost consciousness and sank to the bottom, 30 metres (98 ft) below the water's surface within two minutes of beginning the dive. Watson claimed the currents were stronger than they expected and that he responded to a signal from Tina to return to the dive rope, where he noted a look of worry on her face before she accidentally knocked his mask and air regulator loose. When Watson recovered his sight, Tina was sinking too quickly for him to retrieve her and he quickly surfaced to get help. He also stated that an ear problem prevented him from diving deeper to help her and that there was nothing in his training as a rescue diver "about how to get somebody" in trouble to the surface.

Other divers nearby at the time, including Stanley Stutz, saw Watson engaged in an underwater "bear hug" with his "flailing" wife, after which he headed for the surface while Tina fell to the ocean floor. One diver, Gary Stempler, photographed Tina by chance while taking a picture of his own wife that showed Tina in the background. The photo showed her lying face-up on the ocean floor, something that did not come to light until a couple of weeks later when the pictures were developed. Watson climbed aboard the Spoilsport and alerted dive instructor Wade Singleton, who brought Tina to the surface after ten minutes underwater. She was taken aboard the adjacent dive boat Jazz II, where a doctor tried to resuscitate her for 40 minutes while Watson remained on the Spoilsport, but she was unable to be revived.

== Investigation ==
The day following the death, Tina's autopsy was performed by Professor David Williams, consultant forensic pathologist to the Queensland Coroner. Williams found florid evidence of air embolism, but no degenerative disease. He gave the cause of death as drowning. Due to the unexpected nature of Tina's death and the implausible and conflicting statements given by Watson, the death was investigated by the State Coroner's office. A coronial inquiry was held, as is the usual practice in Australia. Watson had already left Australia by this point and declined to return, so did not testify during the inquest but gave evidence through his lawyers to the inquest and to the Queensland Police. During the inquest, prosecutors submitted evidence that Watson's story contradicted the record of his actions stored by his dive computer. They suggested the possibility that he turned off Tina's regulator and held her until she was unconscious, then turned the air back on and let her sink before surfacing himself. As evidence, they described the many painstaking re-enactments of various scenarios conducted by police divers. Tina's father claimed that Watson had asked Tina, shortly before their wedding, to increase her life insurance and make him the sole beneficiary.

=== Civil action commenced in Alabama ===
In March 2005, Watson launched legal action in Alabama's Jefferson County Circuit Court to recoup the cost of the couple's trip after the travel insurance company refused a payout. He was seeking $45,000 for the accidental death plus compensation for trip interruption, medical expenses, phone calls, taxi fares, fees for extra credit card statements and unspecified punitive damages for mental and emotional anguish. The action was dismissed in May 2008 at Watson's request on the grounds the Australian investigation into his wife's death caused him "to reasonably apprehend that he risks self-incrimination in this case". His Australian legal team believed "it was not in his best interest" to pursue the damages claim and his U.S.-based lawyer, Bob Austin, added that his client would not be voluntarily "going back to Australia."

== Indictment ==
On 19 June 2008, the Coroner laid the following charge:

That on the 22nd day of October 2003 at the site of the historical shipwreck Yongala forty-eight nautical miles south-east from the port of Townsville in the state of Queensland, David Gabriel Watson murdered Christina Mae Watson.

It was reported that the Coroner found "it was likely that Watson had killed his 26-year-old wife by turning off her air supply and holding her in an 'underwater bear hug' until she was dead"; the Coroner, however, had made no such finding.

== Trial and sentence in Australia ==
Gabe Watson
- Born: David Gabriel Watson; 5 March 1977 (age 49)
- Occupation: Salesman
- Spouse(s): Tina Thomas (2003 [11 days]; her death); Kim Lewis (2008–present)
- Parent(s): David and Glenda Watson
- Status: Released and deported
- Conviction: Manslaughter
- Criminal charge: Murder
- Penalty: 4½ years, to be suspended after 1½ years

After resisting extradition for six months, Watson travelled voluntarily from the U.S. to Australia in May 2009 to face trial. At the trial on 5 June 2009, he pleaded not guilty to murder and guilty to, and was convicted of, manslaughter. Crown prosecutor Brendan Campbell pointed out that over time Watson had given police sixteen different versions of what had happened to Tina and that none of those versions matched what the only eyewitness had seen. When Tina was brought to the surface, her regulator was still in her mouth, her tank still had air, and tests indicated no faults with her equipment. Campbell described Watson as an experienced diver trained in rescuing panicked divers, who had allowed his wife to sink to the ocean floor without making any serious attempt to retrieve her. Watson did not inflate Tina's buoyancy control device (BCD) or remove her weight belt, and had failed to fulfill his obligations as her "dive buddy" by not sharing his alternative air source. Watson was sentenced to four-and-a-half years in prison, to be suspended after serving only twelve months.

=== Reaction to the sentence ===
Tina's family stated that Watson's twelve-month term was an embarrassment to Australia. The day following the trial, Alabama Attorney General Troy King lodged an appeal with the Queensland Supreme Court and also wrote to Queensland Attorney-General Cameron Dick. Fairfax Media reported that the letter was leaked to them and published part of it in their newspapers.

The Queensland Director of Public Prosecutions, Tony Moynihan SC, issued a statement, which said: "The decision to accept Mr Watson's plea of guilty to manslaughter was made after a careful and thorough examination of the admissible evidence, and was not taken lightly. Given the complex circumstantial nature of the case, Mr Watson's admission that he breached his duty to render assistance to his wife ultimately meant there was no reasonable prospect of proving, beyond a reasonable doubt, that he was guilty of murder." On 18 June 2009, Dick announced the state would appeal against the inadequacy of Watson's sentence.

=== Appeal ===
The appeal was heard by the Queensland Court of Appeals on 17 July 2009. The Crown asked the court to increase Watson's prison term to two-and-a-half years. The defence argued that Watson had had a momentary lapse in judgment, had been accused of a crime he did not commit, and had voluntarily returned to Australia to co-operate with the court, and that the penalty imposed by the trial judge was fair and just. The findings on appeal were handed down on 18 September 2009. Two members allowed the prosecution's appeal, increasing Watson's period of incarceration by six months to a total of eighteen. One justice, by minority opinion, was in favour of dismissing the appeal.

== Further incidents ==
Tina was buried in her native Pelham, Alabama. Her remains were exhumed in 2007 and moved to a different lot bought by Watson. After being informed by her family that flowers and gifts were repeatedly being vandalized or disappearing from the grave site, even when chained down, police surveillance videos showed Watson removing them with bolt cutters and throwing them in trash cans. Watson later said he removed them because they were "big, gaudy, plastic arrangements". Her grave was unmarked until 2009, when Watson provided a foot marker, prompting her father to request her body be returned for reburial. In 2011, the Probate Court removed Watson as administrator of Tina's estate and appointed her father, who also requested that her school and college pictures and yearbooks be returned. Watson appealed against the ruling and refused to provide the court with an inventory of Tina's possessions. Pending Watson's trial, the Alabama Circuit Court ordered him to stay away from the grave.

== Trial in United States ==
=== Alabama investigation ===
In May 2010, King announced he had information not yet made public and wanted to try Watson for capital murder and kidnapping, asserting jurisdiction based on the theory that the alleged crime was planned in Alabama. King petitioned Australia for the evidence held by police, but was refused access until he gave an undertaking that the death penalty would not be imposed, as required under Australian law. This condition has been strongly criticised by King and Don Valeska, chief of the Attorney General's violent crime division, who stated: "If an Australian woman was killed here, we would immediately send the evidence there. We would not presume to tell the Australian authorities how to run their criminal justice system". In response to the announcement, Watson's parents came to the defence of their son, breaking their public silence on the case. Friends and family of Watson questioned whether he had any motive for the murder, noting that his affection for Tina had seemed genuine, there was no life insurance policy naming him as beneficiary, and he appeared to be emotionally devastated for an extended time following her death.

In June 2010, King assured the Queensland Attorney-General he would not seek the death penalty if Watson was tried in the U.S. for his wife's death. In August 2010 it was announced Watson would be released in November and was likely to be deported to the U.S., where he faced being charged with murder. Valeska stated he would pursue an additional charge of kidnapping by deception. The case was placed before a grand jury in Birmingham, Alabama in October 2010.

Watson was released from prison on 10 November 2010. He was transferred to an immigration detention centre while his deportation was delayed. During this time, Australian authorities sought further written assurances from the U.S. Attorney General that he would not face the death penalty in Alabama if convicted of murder. Under international human rights law, Australia could not deport Watson if he faced execution in his home country. On 25 November 2010 he was deported to the United States and immediately arrested.

=== Arrest ===
Alabama prosecutors charged Watson with murder and kidnapping at the conclusion of his prison sentence in Australia after finding what they claimed was evidence he had plotted to kill his wife while still in the United States. A Birmingham grand jury indicted Watson on murder and kidnapping charges in October 2010. In July 2011, the Circuit Court set the trial date for 13 February 2012; Watson was released on a $100,000 bond.

=== New evidence ===
Colin McKenzie, a key diving expert in the original investigation who had maintained that "a diver with Watson's training should have been able to bring Tina up", subsequently retracted much of his testimony after being provided with Tina and Watson's diver logs, certificates and medical histories, to which he had not previously had access. McKenzie claimed Watson should not have been allowed in the water and never as a dive buddy for his wife, who had no open water scuba experience. Tina had heart surgery to correct an irregular heartbeat two years earlier but on her dive application had stated that she had never had heart problems or surgery. Professor Michael "Mike" Bennett, a leading expert in dive medicine, stated that Tina was unfit to dive without clearance from a cardiologist. Watson had received his rescue certification, normally a four-day course, after completing a two-day course in an Alabama quarry. He had no rescue experience and little open water experience.

According to McKenzie, "He had no hope of being competent, he could barely save himself [that day] let alone his wife; I don't believe he intended to kill her." Revelations that Watson needed help to don his diving equipment that day underscored that he was a "dangerous amateur" who showed "a complete lack of courage" when he abandoned his wife. The dive company had offered an orientation and guided dive with a dive master, which both Tina and Watson had refused. Company head Mike Ball said his people took Watson at his word, believing he was an experienced and certified rescue diver. The company later pleaded guilty to contravening safety standards (their code of conduct said both Watson and Tina must be supervised by at least a divemaster on the dive in question) and was fined $6,500, plus costs of $1,500.

=== Dismissal of the case ===
Alabama judge Tommy Nail ruled that evidence of Watson's behaviour following Tina's death was inadmissible. Nail also blocked Tina's father from giving evidence regarding Watson's alleged attempts to increase Tina's life insurance. On 23 February 2012, Nail acquitted Watson for lack of evidence without the defence needing to present its case. Nail said that the state's evidence was "sorely lacking" and that the prosecution could not prove that Watson had any financial motive. Prosecutor Don Valeska said that this was the first time he had a trial end in a judge's acquittal in the 41 years he had been trying cases. Regarding the judge's decision, Thomas said, "It should have gone to the jury for them to decide."

== In media ==
A feature on the death of Tina Watson was broadcast in a 90-minute account that aired on Dateline NBC on 19 May 2008. An examination of Tina's death and Watson's subsequent trial and appeal was published by The Age on 17 July 2010. The author was Walkley Award winning investigative journalist, Peter Patrick. A feature on the death of Tina and her husband's Alabama acquittal was broadcast on an episode of the Australian 60 Minutes on 25 March 2012. Lifetime produced a made-for-TV movie, Fatal Honeymoon, based on the death of Tina Watson, starring Harvey Keitel, Billy Miller and Amber Clayton. It premiered on 25 August 2012. Tina Watson's death was explored on Casefile True Crime Podcast (Case 51) which was published on 22 April 2017.
