= Funny Man (film) =

1994 British comedy horror film

- DVD cover
- Directed by: Simon Sprackling
- Written by: Simon Sprackling
- Produced by: Nigel Odell
- Starring: Christopher Lee; Tim James; Pauline Black; Benny Young
- Cinematography: Tom Ingle Jr
- Edited by: Ryan Lee Driscoll
- Music by: Francis Haines; Stephen W. Parsons
- Distributed by: Arrow Media
- Release date: 7 October 1994
- Running time: 90 minutes
- Country: United Kingdom
- Language: English
- Budget: $1 million

Funny Man is a 1994 British comedy horror film written and directed by Simon Sprackling. It stars Christopher Lee, Tim James, Pauline Black and Benny Young.

== Plot ==
When Max Taylor wins the ancestral home of Callum Chance in a game of poker, little does he realize that the game is far from over. Max Taylor chooses to ignore Chance's ominous warning and moves into the house within days. After moving into the ancestral home with his family, the nightmare begins after Max spins a wheel of chance, (a wheel with four parts, two saying win, and two saying lose). It lands upon lose, and this awakens a demonic creature that lives in the soil of the ancestral home. Soon, one by one, Max's family are murdered by this strange creature known as the Funny Man, a Mr. Punch-like jester with a varied and imaginative repertoire of homicidal techniques and a highly irreverent sense of humor. This sense of humor is shared with the audience. He is the only character that addresses the audience directly, as in a pantomime.

He kills off Max's wife and both kids in gruesome yet humorous ways. Max's son being the first, after walking around a pillar in circles playing with Funny Man, he stops and is killed off screen. After, Funny Man changes his voice to sound like Max's son and talk Max's wife while looking at her through a key hole, he is then seen dragging the child's body away and telling the audience "when hosting a party, it's always good to put the little ones down first." Max's wife is beaten to death with a club after failing to escape an endless room. Max's daughter is killed while playing a Game Boy after Funny Man hooks jumper cables up to her head, electrocuting her to death to the point where she catches fire.

Meanwhile, Max's brother, Johnny Taylor, is on his way to the mansion with a bunch of hitchhikers. Among the hitchhikers is a voodoo woman who after using tarot cards later learns about the awakening of the Funny Man. At first, after arriving at the ancestral home, everything seems fine. But the Funny Man has made his targets, and his evil game has begun. It soon becomes a Scooby-Doo Rock'n'Roll madhouse with bizarre scenes, gruesome kills and many humorous moments.

== Cast ==
- Tim James as Funny Man
- Christopher Lee as Callum Chance
- Benny Young as Max Taylor
- Matthew Devitt as Johnny Taylor
- Ingrid Lacey as Tina Taylor
- Jamie Heard as Jamie Taylor
- Harry Heard as Harry Taylor
- Pauline Black as Psychic commando
- Rhona Cameron as Thelma Fudd
- Ed Bishop as Card Player

== Awards ==
Funny Man was nominated at the Fantasporto in 1995 for the International Fantasy Best Film Award.
