= Dean Murphy =

Australian screenwriter, producer and director

Dean Murphy is an Australian screenwriter, producer and director.

Dean Murphy wrote, produced and directed his first feature, 'Just Cruising' at the age of 17, he followed this with a sitcom pilot for the Nine Network. In 1992 he wrote, produced and directed his second feature before moving to Los Angeles to write and develop projects with producer George Folsey Jr. (Trading Places, Coming to America).

Dean returned to Australia in 1997 to direct his third feature and became a founding member of Instinct Entertainment. Dean went on to produce Till Human Voices Wake Us starring Guy Pearce and Helena Bonham Carter, co-write, executive produce and direct the Paul Hogan, Michael Caton feature Strange Bedfellows, (which took $5,000,000 at the Australian box office) produce the US set thriller Torn, the children's DVD series, Zokky – The Kangaroo and executive produce the feature documentary Salute. In 2009 Dean directed the Paul Hogan, Shane Jacobson feature Charlie & Boots, followed up by co-writing Kevin "Bloody" Wilson's Little Johnny. In 2012 Dean directed the top rating ABC telemovie, Cliffy, the ABC documentary Hanging with Hoges and has been producing live theatre including Mother & Son starring Noeline Brown and Shane Jacobson and An Evening with Hoges starring Aussie Icon, Paul Hogan. Dean also directed the ABC/Opera Australia project The Divorce starring Marina Prior, Lisa McCune, Hugh Sheridan and Kate Miller Heidke. In 2017 Dean wrote and directed That's Not My Dog! starring 30 of Australia's biggest stars in comedy before teaming up with John Cleese, Chevy Chase, Jacob Elordi, Paul Hogan and Olivia Newton John on his 12th feature. In 2023 Dean produced The Roast of Paul Hogan, in 2024 he co-wrote and co-directed the stage musical Midnight The Cinderella Story and again partnered up with a comedy legend for The Australian Roast of John Cleese.

== Credits ==
- Just Cruising (1988) (Video Feature) - Director, Writer, Producer
- Friends (1990) (TV Pilot) - Director, Writer, Producer
- Lex and Rory (1994) - Producer, Writer, Director
- Muggers (2000) - Director
- Till Human Voices Wake Us (2002) - Producer
- Strange Bedfellows (2004) - Executive Producer, Director, Writer
- Salute (2008) (Feature Documentary) - Executive Producer
- Zokky the Kangaroo (2009) (TV series) - Producer
- Charlie and Boots (2009) - Producer, Director
- The Best of Paul Hogan - 1 & 2 (2010) (TV Special) - Director
- Torn (2010) - Producer
- Little Johnny the Movie (2011) - Producer, Writer
- Cliffy (2013) (TV Movie) - Director
- Strange Bedfellows - The Musical (2014) (Musical) - Producer, Writer
- Mother and Son (2014) (Stage) - Producer
- Hanging with Hoges (2014) (Documentary) - Producer, Writer
- Sister Soul (2015) (Stage) - Producer
- The Subjects (2015) (Movie) - Producer
- Hoges; One Night Only! (2015) (TV Special) - Producer
- The Divorce (2015) (4 Part TV Series) - Director
- That's Not My Dog! (2017) (Movie) - Writer, Director
- The Very Excellent Mr. Dundee (2020) - Director, Writer, Producer
- The Roast of Paul Hogan (2023) Producer
- Midnight The Cinderella Musical (Stage) (2024) Co-Writer/Director - Producer
- The Australian Roast of John Cleese (2024) Producer - Head Writer
