= Lex and Rory =

1994 Australian film

- Directed by: Dean Murphy
- Written by: Dean Murphy
- Produced by: Scott Andrews & Dean Murphy
- Starring: Scott Andrews; Angus Benfield; Fiona MacGregor; Wendy Holics; Paul Robertson
- Cinematography: Tim Smart
- Edited by: John Leonard & Barry Minster
- Music by: Frank Strangio
- Release date: 17 July 1993
- Running time: 99 minutes
- Country: Australia
- Language: English
- Budget: $1.2 million
- Box office: A$39,285 (Australia)

Lex and Rory is a 1993 Australian film about four teenagers living in Albury-Wodonga, two of which strike up a connection by phone. It was directed by Dean Murphy and produced by Murphy and Scott Andrews.

== Plot ==
Two teenagers, Lex and Rory, are close friends who live in a garage and are trying to work out how to talk to girls. Meanwhile, Dai and Nikki wish that boys would approach them. Lex courts Dai by phone using a pseudonym, while Rory supports his attempts to seduce her behind the scenes. Dai also struggles with a father who will not let her follow her dreams.

== Production and release ==
The script was written while Murphy worked on a farm in Kiewa and Andrews worked in his father's Albury office furniture shop as an auctioneer. The story was partly based on their own life experiences, and both would "walk the streets at midnight, discussing ideas." Lex and Rory was conceived as a low-budget project that would cost around $10,000 to make, but ended up costing $1.2 million. Funding mostly came from friends, family members and local residents as well as product placement deals with Schweppes, Telecom and Porsche. The film was shot on location in Albury-Wodonga with the cooperation of the Royal Australian Army, who provided many of the sets in an area that was apparently "littered with unexploded bombs." Cast and crew were told, "If you go out there and get a leg blown off, you're on your own." The set for Lex and Rory's residence, "The Garage", was located in a "cold concrete block house" in the ammunition wing of the Ordnance Corps. The film premiered in Albury on 17 July 1993. It was released theatrically in Melbourne and Sydney, and later on VHS. Murphy and Andrews later traveled to the United States for screenings in Hollywood but seemingly a release there did not eventuate.

== Critical reception ==
Adrian Martin called Lex and Rory "puzzlingly unreal" in its combination of both melodramatic and teen comedy elements, comparing it to both Twin Peaks and the work of Savage Steve Holland. Robert Macklin in The Canberra Times felt that the film was "a metaphor for (Murphy and Andrews') own breakthrough" in making the film itself", adding: "It reminded me of the explorers and the bush pioneers, and Australia's young aviators of the 20s and 30s, and the spirit of Tobruk, and Betty Cuthbert and Raelene Boyle, and every young Australian writer or thinker who dares take on the establishment... While that spirit lives, we are all enriched and empowered."
