= Two Brothers Running =

- Directed by: Ted Robinson
- Written by: Morris Lurie
- Produced by: Phillip Emanuel
- Starring: Tom Conti; Elizabeth Alexander; Ritchie Singer; Asher Keddie
- Production company: Phillip Emanuel Productions
- Release date: 1988
- Country: Australia
- Language: English
- Budget: $2.4 million

Two Brothers Running is a 1988 Australian comedy film directed by Ted Robinson and starring Tom Conti, Elizabeth Alexander, Ritchie Singer, and Asher Keddie.

The film never obtained a cinema release.

== Cast ==
- Tom Conti as Moses Borstein
- Elizabeth Alexander as Barbara Borstein
- Ritchie Singer as Ben
- Asher Keddie as Ruthie Bornstein
- Debra Lawrance as Pat
- John Gregg as Nelson
