= The Last Warhorse =

- Directed by: Bob Meillon
- Written by: Colin Free
- Produced by: Helen Boyd
- Starring: Graham Dow; Rob Carlton
- Production company: JNP
- Release date: 1986
- Running time: 93 mins
- Country: Australia
- Language: English
- Budget: $500,000

The Last Warhorse is a 1986 Australian film about a Japanese businessman who tries to acquire a property belonging to a horse owning family. It was shot in Wahroonga and Glebe.

== Plot ==
Ishikawa, a Japanese businessman (Kazue Matsumoto), takes up residence in Sydney to direct the construction of a waterfront development. However, his employees secretly use his name to acquire the adjoining property to get access to horses.

== Cast ==
- Graham Dow
- Ritchie Singer as Lassiter
- Rob Carlton as Ray
- Richard Morgan as Bob
- Kazue Matsumoto as Ishikawa
- Olivia Martin
- Kristin Veriga
