= Emu Runner =

Australian film directed by Imogen Thomas

- Film poster
- Directed by: Imogen Thomas
- Written by: Imogen Thomas, Frayne Barker
- Produced by: Imogen Thomas, Victor Evatt
- Starring: Rhae-Kye Waites; Wayne Blair; Rob Carlton; Georgia Blizzard
- Release dates: 7 September 2018 (TIFF); 7 November 2019
- Running time: 95 minutes
- Country: Australia
- Language: English

Emu Runner is a 2018 Australian independent film. It was written and directed by Imogen Thomas, who wrote the film with Indigenous script consultant Frayne Barker. Thomas co-produced the film with Victor Evatt.

== Cast ==
- Rhae-Kye Waites as Gemma
- Wayne Blair as Jay Jay
- Rob Carlton as Stan
- Georgia Blizzard as Heidi Goodell
- Maurial Spearim as Darlene
- Stella Carter as Tessa
- Mary Waites as Daphne
- Lindsay Waites as Uncle Wes
- Letisha Boney as Valerie
- Rodney McHughes as Ecka

== Plot ==
The film centres around 9-year-old Ngemba girl Gemma "Gem" Daniels (played by 11-year-old Rhae-Kye Waites) who lives in the remote New South Wales town of Brewarrina.

Following a fishing trip on the banks of the Barwon River with her mother Darlene (Spearim) and older sister Valerie (Boney), Darlene unexpectedly collapses. Despite sprinting into town to get help from her father Jay Jay (Blair) and older brother Ecka (McHughes), there is little they can do.

As the family grieve following Darlene's death, Gemma finds comfort by spending time and bonding with a wild emu, her mother's Totem animal.

Despite having great potential at being a junior athletics champion as a talented runner, Gemma begins to wag school to spend time with the emu, stealing food for the emu to eat, which brings her to the attention of local police officer Stan (Carlton) and social worker Heidi (Blizzard) who make their own assumptions about Jay Jay's ability to look after his family. Gemma's older brother Ecker is facing issues of his own when he develops an alcohol problem, gets involved in drugs and is hospitalised after being assaulted, which leads to Jay Jay becoming involved in a scuffle outside the local hotel and arrested for affray.

Heidi attempts to remove Gemma from her family but after being forced to take a detour on an unsealed backroad due to an accident on the highway, she and Gemma become stranded after almost colliding with an emu, which damages the car. After spending the night together on the deserted road, Heidi begins to understand Gemma's behaviour and realises that she belongs with her family. The following morning, Gemma sprints the long distance back into town to get help for Heidi.

== Production ==
Production of the film commenced in Brewarrina in 2017.

The film was made with a very limited budget and relied on two crowd funding campaigns, and a "goodwill arrangement" of much of the cast and crew. More than $40,000 was raised on crowdfunding platform Pozible with completion funding obtained from Screen Australia. Additional post production funding consisted of grants from the Aboriginal Benefits Foundation and individual donations. Blair worked on the film between shooting days for Mystery Road.

Much of the cast, including Rhae-Kye Waites, were Brewarrina locals who had little or no acting experience, some of whom were also family members of Waites. Waites' grandmother Mary Waites played Gemma's grandmother in the film, her grandfather Lindsay Waites played Gemma's uncle, and her cousin, Letisha Boney, played Gemma's sister.

== Release ==
The world premiere of Emu Runner was held at the Toronto International Film Festival on 7 September 2018, prior to its Australian premiere at the Adelaide Film Festival on 14 October 2018.

Emu Runner was commercially released in a small number of Australian cinemas more than a year later on 7 November 2019.

The film was released on DVD on 5 February 2020.

== Reception ==
The film received mostly favourable reviews.

David Stratton awarded the film four stars in The Australian. He described the film as a "simple but evocative yarn beautifully told by Thomas and her cast" and praised the cinematography by Michael Gibbs which Stratton said proved to be a "major asset".

Eddie Cockrell praised the film in Variety for being a "serene and finely detailed coming of age tale" and credited Thomas for her "deep, rich meditation on family on family, community, country and racial tensions". He also praised cameraman Michael Gibbs for capturing the "magisterial vastness of the plains surrounding the town" with a "sobering yet beautiful effect" and the editors for seamlessly blending the emu footage (which was shot separately at an emu farm in Tooraweenah) into the movie.

Sandra Hall awarded the film three and a half stars in The Sydney Morning Herald. She said despite there being few surprises and "a slightly heavy-handed predictability in the way the denouement plays out", the viewer gains "a clear insight into the way racial prejudice can precipitate a rush to judgement by even the seemingly enlightened".

In her review for Seventh Row, Gillie Collins described the film as "an uplifting tale of communal solidarity in the face of personal, yet politically charged, hardship".

Stephanie Bunbury in The Age said that "in an ostensibly simple story, Thomas subtly explores complex themes of family and identity". Bunbury singled out Blair for praise describing him being "at his brusque best as Jay Jay" but also praising the Brewarrina locals who played their roles with "tremendous feeling".

In a more critical review, Cinema Scope's Sarah-Tai Black said that the film "stalls out" because of the lack of a "stronger directional construction". Black also described the presence of an "unfortunate parallel" between the idealistic white social worker and the film's white director Imogen Thomas. Black also wrote that the film's biggest fault was that "it takes more than it gives back" and suggested that it may have fared better if it had been directed by an Indigenous Australian filmmaker.

== Awards and nominations ==
The film won the Best Australian Independent Film Peer Award at the Gold Coast Film Festival in 2019.

It was nominated for the People's Choice Award at the 2018 Toronto International Film Festival, for Best Asia Pacific Film at the 2018 Hawaii International Film Festival, for the Michel Award for Best Children's Film at the 2019 Hamburg Film Festival, and for The Age Critic's Award at the 2019 Melbourne International Film Festival.

Emu Runner was also nominated for Best Indie Film at the 9th AACTA Awards in 2019.
