= Saracen (TV series) =

1989 British television drama series

- Country of origin: United Kingdom
- Original language: English
- No. of series: 1
- No. of episodes: 13

Production
- Running time: 1 hour (including ads)
- Production company: Central Independent Television

Original release
- Network: ITV
- Release: 2 September – 25 November 1989

Saracen is a 1989 British television drama series. Made for ITV by Central Independent Television, it starred Christian Burgess and Patrick James Clarke in the title roles. 13 episodes were made which were shown throughout the autumn of 1989.

== Series history ==
The series was created by Ted Childs and Chris Kelly. In the pilot episode, the action concentrated on SAS Major David Barber (played by Stephen Hattersley) who resigns his commission after being forced to undertake a badly-planned hostage rescue. He was Headhunted by elite private security company Saracen Systems and is partnered up with an Australian ex-Army sergeant Jack Carne (John Walton). Saracen Systems, operated at home and abroad, usually Africa, but could only carry firearms when on foreign missions.

This was a glossy, expensive film production, perhaps intended to bring back the success of previous ITV action drama like The Professionals.

== Main cast ==
- Christian Burgess as David Barber
- Patrick James Clarke as Tom Duffy
- Michael Byrne as Colonel Patrick Ansell
- John Bennett as Nugent
- Ingrid Lacey as Alice

== DVD release ==
Network released the full 13-part series on DVD as a 4-disc set on 7 June 2010.
