= Whiskey Echo =

2005 mini-series

- Also known as: Zona de Guerra (Brazil)
- Created by: David Young
- Starring: Joanne Kelly; Callum Keith Rennie; David Alpay; Jason Barry; Dominique McElligott
- Composer: Paul Intson
- Country of origin: Ireland; Canada
- No. of episodes: 4

Production
- Production location: South Africa
- Running time: 4 x 60 minutes
- Production company: Barna-Alper Productions

Original release
- Release: January 17 – February 8, 2005

Whiskey Echo is an Irish-Canadian mini-series that follows a group of young international aid workers who have set up a health centre in Sudan during the Second Sudanese Civil War.

== Characters ==
Whiskey Echo had a large ensemble cast of characters.

The aid workers

- Dr. Rollie Saunders (Callum Keith Rennie)
- Jenna Breeden (Joanne Kelly)
- Rachel (Dominique McElligott)
- Carlo (David Alpay)
- Rafe (Jason Barry)
- Mo (San Shella)

The refugees

- Bernadette (Nthati Moshesh)
- Kim (Thapelo Ragedi)

The military

- Simon Mabor (Frederick McCormack)
