= Outback Vampires =

- Guild Home Video VHS cover
- Written by: David Young; Colin Eggleston
- Directed by: Colin Eggleston
- Starring: Richard Morgan; Angela Kennedy; Brett Climo; John Doyle
- Country of origin: Australia
- Original language: English

Production
- Producers: James Vernon; Jan Tyrrell
- Cinematography: Gary Wapshott
- Editor: Josephine Cook
- Production companies: Cine Funds Limited; Somerset Film Productions

Original release
- Release: 1987

Outback Vampires is a 1987 Australian comedy horror film directed by Colin Eggleston. It features Richard Morgan, Angela Kennedy, Brett Climo and Richard Carter. It was written by Colin Eggleston and David Young. It was filmed in Yarralumla, Australian Capital Territory, Australia.

In the film, a trio of travelers are stranded in a strange small town. They are instructed by the locals to visit the mansion of a local aristocrat. The visitors discover that the house is occupied by a family of eccentric undead people, that the mansion's design keeps changing, and that the haunted house is seemingly celebrating a never-ending Christmas.

== Cast ==
- Richard Morgan as Nick
- Angela Kennedy as Lucy
- Brett Climo as Bronco
- John Doyle as Sir Alfred Terminus
- Maggie Blinco as Agatha / Frau Etzel
- David Gibson as George
- Antonia Murphy as Samantha
- Lucky Grills as Humphrey
- Richard Carter as Stinger
- Andy Devine as Jock
- David Whitford as Ambrose
- Annie Semler as Mavis

== Plot ==
Whilst on their way to a rodeo festival, Lucy (Angela Kennedy), Nick (Richard Morgan) and Bronco's (Brett Climo) car breaks down, leaving them stranded in a small town. The odd-ball locals send them to Sir Alfred's (John Doyle) mansion on the top of hill.

Once inside the mansion, things become even weirder. Sir Alfred's wife seems quite deranged, his daughter almost psychotic and his son is extremely eccentric. After becoming separated, Lucy, Nick and Bronco are taken on a surrealist journey through the mansion, which is still decorated with Christmas decorations.

The scenes in the house are shot in blue-tones, characters are able to climb on walls, people are told to "follow the bouncing ball", doors suddenly vanish and there is a music-video style performance by a band at one point. The three friends must band together to find a way out of this haunted house and rid the town of this undead family once and for all.

== Production ==
The film was also known as The Wicked and Prince at the Court of Yarralumla. The film was not released in cinemas and aired on TV 18 June 1988.
