= John O'May =

Australian actor

- Born: 1947 (age 78–79); Baltimore, Maryland, United States
- Education: Patapsco High School
- Occupations: Actor, writer
- Years active: 1972–current

John O'May (born 1947) is an American-born Australian actor, best known for his stage performances.

== Early life ==
O'May was born at Johns Hopkins Hospital in Baltimore, Maryland, one of four children. He grew up with a love of reading and literature. At university he dabbled in theatre, learning acting, stagecraft and building sets. He became a teacher at Patapsco High School, where he himself had attended high school. He taught English literature for two and a half years. He eventually travelled overseas, and after visiting his sister in Australia and ended up staying.

== Career ==
In 1972, O'May auditioned for the role of Ashley Wilkes in Gone with the Wind. He took singing lessons and found an agent. In 1973, he was offered an audition and role in Godspell, replacing John Waters as Judas. He created and performed in the revues Gershwin (with John Diedrich) in 1975 and The 20s and All That Jazz (with Diedrich and Caroline Gilmer) in 1977.

O'May played Che Guevara in the original Australian cast of Evita which opened in Adelaide in April 1980. In the 1980s he was a regular performer with the Melbourne Theatre Company, and played Bobby in Company for the Sydney Theatre Company in 1986 and Captain Corcoran in H.M.S. Pinafore for the Victoria State Opera in 1987.

He directed and starred in the musical Seven Little Australians in 1988.

O'May played Monsieur André in the original Australian cast of The Phantom of the Opera which opened at the Princess Theatre in Melbourne in December 1990. He later performed each of the two manager characters in various productions over the subsequent decades.

Other notable roles include Marvin in Falsettos in 1994 for the Sydney Theatre Company, Nick Arnstein in Funny Girl in 1999, John Wilkes Booth in Assassins in 1995, and Fredrik Egerman in A Little Night Music in 1997, both for the Melbourne Theatre Company. For the latter, he received a Green Room Award for male artist in a leading role. In 2014 he appeared as Doctor Tambourri in Sondheim's Passion. In 2022, he portrayed the Mysterious Man and Cinderella’s Father in Into the Woods in North Melbourne, Australia.

Film credits include supporting roles in the films Starstruck and Rebel and the television opera The Divorce (2015). In 2000, O’May guest-starred in season 2, episode 11, "Sponsorship and Media Discontent", of the ABC mockumentary, The Games.

== Acting credits ==
=== Film ===
Year	Title	Role	Type
1974	Between Wars	William Faulkner	Feature film
1982	Starstruck	Terry	Feature film
1983	Skin Deep	Roger Crane	TV movie
1985	Rebel	Benie	Feature film
1988	Georgia	Mr Leonard	Feature film
1988	The Four Minute Mile	Bill Easton	TV movie
2001	Child Star: The Shirley Temple Story	Louis B. Mayer	TV movie
2011	A Heartbeat Away	Desmond Fyfe	Feature film
2020	The Very Excellent Mr. Dundee	Earl of Spencer	Feature film
2023	Late Night with the Devil	Walker Bedford	Feature film
2024	Better Man	Terry Swinton	Feature film

=== Television ===
Year	Title	Role	Type
1978	The Sullivans	Yank Sergeant	TV series, 4 episodes
1983	Carson's Law	John Kendall	TV series, 14 episodes
1983	Kings	Dick Manning	TV series, 2 episodes
1985	The Flying Doctors	Michael	Miniseries, episode 3
1986	The Lancaster Miller Affair	J.F. Russell	Miniseries, 3 episodes
1988	The Flying Doctors	Max Prescott	TV series, season 3, episode 7: "Figures in a Landscape"
1990	The Paper Man	Victor Dove	Miniseries, 2 episodes
1992	Cluedo	Buzz Bradshaw III	TV series, season 2, episode 3: "With a Smile on His Dial"
1997	State Coroner	Marcus Brophy	TV series, season 1, 2 episodes
1998	Good Guys, Bad Guys	Tyrone O'Keefe	TV series, season 2, episode 11: "Doof"
2000	The Games	George Birmingham	TV mockumentary series, season 2, episode 11: "Sponsorship and Media Discontent"
2001	Crash Zone	Phil Kurtz	TV series, season 2, episode 12: "Skin Deep"
2007	City Homicide	Peter Murdoch	TV series, season 1, episode 13: "Rostered Day Off"
2015	The Divorce	Jed	Miniseries, 4 episodes

=== Theatre ===
==== As actor ====
Year	Title	Role	Type
1973	Godspell	Judas	Princess Theatre, Launceston, Theatre Royal, Hobart, Her Majesty's Theatre, Melbourne, Canberra Theatre with J. C. Williamson
1977	Money the Root of All...		Victorian regional tour with Arena Theatre Company
1978	No, No, Nanette	Billy	Playhouse Theatre, Perth with National Theatre Inc
1979	Sexual Perversity in Chicago	Adam Shapiro	Playbox Theatre, Melbourne with Hoopla Theatre Foundation
1979	The Ripper Show	Mr Barclay	Playbox Theatre, Melbourne with Hoopla Theatre Foundation
1980–1981	Evita	Che Guevara	Festival Theatre, Adelaide, Perth Entertainment Centre, Her Majesty's Theatre, Melbourne, Her Majesty's Theatre, Sydney
1981	Royal Charity Performance	Singer	Festival Theatre, Adelaide
1982	Moving Target		Upstage Theatre Restaurant, Sydney
1983; 1984	Insignificance		Adelaide Festival Centre, Sydney Opera House
1983	Beyond Therapy	Bruce	Playbox Theatre, Melbourne
1984	Extremities	Raul	Sydney Opera House with Sydney Theatre Company
1984	Pax Americana	The President	Playhouse, Melbourne with Melbourne Theatre Company
1984	The Curse of the Werewolf		Playhouse, Melbourne with Melbourne Theatre Company
1985	The Glass Menagerie	Jim	Playhouse, Melbourne with Melbourne Theatre Company
1985	Too Young for Ghosts		Fairfax Studio, Melbourne with Melbourne Theatre Company
1985	Blue Window	Griever	St Martins Theatre, Melbourne with Playbox Theatre Company
1986	Company	Bobby	Sydney Opera House with Sydney Theatre Company
1986	Heartbreak House		Playhouse, Melbourne with Melbourne Theatre Company
1986	The Servant of Two Masters		Playhouse, Melbourne with Melbourne Theatre Company
1986	The Shadow of a Gunman	Donal Davoren	Playhouse, Melbourne with Melbourne Theatre Company
1987	H.M.S. Pinafore	Captain Corcoran	Sydney, Brisbane, Adelaide, State Theatre, Melbourne, Canberra Theatre, Her Majesty’s Theatre, Ballarat with Victoria State Opera
1987	La belle Hélène	Paris	State Theatre, Melbourne with Victoria State Opera
1988–1989	Seven Little Australians	Captain Woolcott	Theatre Royal, Hobart, Comedy Theatre, Melbourne, Adelaide Festival Centre, University of Sydney
1989	The Normal Heart	Ned Weeks	Wharf Theatre, Sydney with Sydney Theatre Company
1989	Harold in Italy	Harold	Sydney Opera House with Sydney Theatre Company
1990	Daylight Saving	Joshua Makepeace	Russell Street Theatre, Melbourne with Melbourne Theatre Company
1990	Love Letters	Andrew Makepeace III	Playhouse, Melbourne with Victorian Arts Centre
1990	Woman in Mind	Andy	Playhouse, Melbourne with Melbourne Theatre Company
1990	Moby Dick		Malthouse Theatre, Melbourne for Melbourne International Arts Festival
1990; 1993	The Phantom of the Opera	Monsieur André	Princess Theatre, Melbourne, Theatre Royal, Sydney
1991	A Night of Infectious Laughter		Melbourne Athenaeum
1992	Showboat		Mietta's, Melbourne
1992	Into the Woods	Baker	State Theatre, Melbourne
1992	Six Degrees of Separation		Sydney Opera House with Sydney Theatre Company
1994	Falsettos	Marvin	Sydney Opera House, Monash University, Theatre Royal, Hobart, Canberra Theatre with Sydney Theatre Company
1994	Mack and Mabel - In Concert		State Theatre, Melbourne, State Theatre, Sydney
1994	Always		Victorian Arts Centre with Melbourne Theatre Company
1994	Cyrano	Ragueneau	Lyric Theatre, Brisbane
1995	Assassins	John Wilkes Booth	Fairfax Studio, Melbourne with Melbourne Theatre Company
1995	Candide	Singer	Lyric Theatre, Brisbane
1996	Christopher Columbus	Christopher Columbus	Her Majesty’s Theatre, Ballarat
1997; 1998	A Little Night Music	Fredrik Egerman	Playhouse, Melbourne, Princess Theatre, Melbourne, Theatre Royal, Sydney with Melbourne Theatre Company
1997; 1998	A One Night Stand with the Stars of Australian Musical Theatre		Melbourne Athenaeum, Melbourne Concert Hall
1997	Crazy for You	Bela Zangler	State Theatre, Melbourne
1999	The Merry Widow	Count Danilo Danilovich	State Theatre, Melbourne, Festival Theatre, Adelaide, Lyric Theatre, Sydney
1999	Funny Girl	Nick Arnstein	Melbourne Concert Hall with The Production Company
1999	Elegies for Angels, Punks and Raging Queens		Melbourne Athenaeum
2000	Ship of Fools	Destiny	Chapel Off Chapel, Melbourne
2000	Being Alive		Capers Cabaret, Melbourne
2001; 2002	Three Vile Men		Chapel Off Chapel, Melbourne, Space Theatre, Adelaide
2001	The Tempest	Alonso	Playhouse, Melbourne with Melbourne Theatre Company
2002–2004	Mamma Mia!	Harry Bright	Lyric Theatre, Sydney, Burswood Theatre, Perth, Festival Theatre, Adelaide, Civic Theatre, Auckland, Hong Kong Cultural Centre, Esplanade Theatre, Singapore, Lyric Theatre, Brisbane, Her Majesty's Theatre, Melbourne
2005	Kiss Me, Kate	General Harrison Howell / Harry Trevor	State Theatre, Melbourne with The Production Company
2006	This Is The Moment!		Sydney Opera House, Hamer Hall, Melbourne
2006–2009	The Phantom of the Opera	Monsieur Firmin / Monsieur Andre	Hong Kong Cultural Centre, Esplanade Theatre, Singapore, Princess Theatre, Melbourne, Lyric Theatre, Brisbane, Lyric Theatre, Sydney, The Civic, Auckland, Adelaide Entertainment Centre, Taipei Arena
2008	The Light in the Piazza	Signor Naccarelli	Lyric Theatre, Sydney
2008	The Music of the Night		Statement Lounge, Sydney
2011	Anything Goes	Elijah Whitney	State Theatre, Melbourne with The Production Company
2011	Grey Gardens	Major Bouvier / Norman Vincent Peale	State Theatre, Melbourne with The Production Company
2012	La Cage Aux Folles	Georges	National Theatre, Melbourne with Quirky Productions
2012	South Pacific	Captain Bracket	Sydney Opera House with Opera Australia
2013	Brel	Singer	Space Theatre, Adelaide for Adelaide Cabaret Festival
2014	The Last Confession	Cardinal Felici	His Majesty's Theatre, Perth, Lyric Theatre, Brisbane, Her Majesty's Theatre, Adelaide, Comedy Theatre, Melbourne, Theatre Royal Sydney
2014	Passion	Doctor Tambourri	Arts Centre Melbourne
2017	Cabaret	Herr Schultz	Hayes Theatre Co, Sydney, Melbourne Athenaeum
2018	A Little Night Music	Frederick Egerman	Geelong Performing Arts Centre, National Theatre, Melbourne, Whitehorse Centre, Melbourne
2019	Charlie and the Chocolate Factory	Grandpa Joe	Her Majesty's Theatre, Melbourne
2019	Ragtime	Henry Ford	State Theatre, Melbourne
2022	Into the Woods	Mysterious Man / Cinderella's Father	Arts House Meat Market, Melbourne
2023	Bloom	Roland	Arts Centre Melbourne with Melbourne Theatre Company

==== As writer/director ====
Year	Title	Role	Type
1975; 1976	Gershwin	Playwright	Arena Theatre, Melbourne, Total Theatre, Melbourne with Total Theatre, Production
1977–1979	The Twenties and All That Jazz	Playwright	Arena Theatre, Melbourne, Her Majesty's Theatre, Melbourne, Theatre Royal, Hobart, Regal Theatre, Perth, Canberra Theatre, Theatre Royal Sydney, Victorian regional tour, Her Majesty's Theatre, Brisbane, Orange Civic Theatre, The Griffith Duncan Theatre, Callaghan, Playhouse, Adelaide
1977	The Australian Travelling Patent Medicine Show	Director	Arena Theatre Company, Melbourne
1977	The Season Reason	Director	Victorian regional tour with Arena Theatre Company
1977	The Persecution and Assassination of Higher School Certificate Poetry as Performed by the Inmates of the Arena Theatre	Director	Arena Theatre Company, Melbourne
1978	Patrick's Hat Trick	Playwright	Playbox Theatre, Melbourne with Hoopla Theatre Foundation
1978	Makin' Wicky Wacky	Director	The Last Laugh, Melbourne
1981	A Couple of Strangers	Devisor	Nimrod Theatre, Sydney
1982	Patrick's Hat Trick	Playwright	Monash University
1983	The Twenties and All That Jazz	Playwright	The Hole in the Wall Theatre, Perth
2000	Being Alive	Devisor	Capers Cabaret, Melbourne
1988–1989	Seven Little Australians	Director	Theatre Royal, Hobart, Comedy Theatre, Melbourne, Adelaide Festival Centre, University of Sydney
2008	The Light in the Piazza	Director / Producer	Lyric Theatre, Sydney
