= Benny Young =

Scottish actor

- Born: Robert Young
- Occupation: Actor

Robert "Benny" Young is a Scottish film, television and stage actor.

In 2009, Young toured with the National Theatre of Scotland production Be Near Me.

In 2013 Young appeared in the West End production of The Resistible Rise of Arturo Ui at the Duchess Theatre.

Young appeared in the Edinburgh International Festival 2018 in the production of David Greig's Midsummer.

In 2018 Young played Sir Simon Fraser in the Netflix original film Outlaw King, which premiered at the Toronto International Film Festival on 6 September 2018. In autumn 2023, he played Moon in the Lyceum Theatre, Edinburgh and Pitlochry Festival Theatre production of Peter Arnott's Group Portrait in a Summer Landscape.

== Filmography ==
Year	Title	Role	Notes
1976	Nosey Dobson	PC MacLean	
1981	Chariots of Fire	Rob Liddell	
1981–1982	Maggie	Colin Scott	TV series
1985	White Nights	Flight Engineer	
1985	Out of Africa	Minister	
1985	The Girl in the Picture	Ron	
1986	Captive	Psychologist	
1994	Funny Man	Max Taylor	
2013	National Theatre Live: Macbeth	Scottish Doctor	
2018	Outlaw King	Sir Simon Fraser	
2018	Wild Rose	Judge	
2021	Shetland	James Pérez	TV series

== Theatre ==
Year	Title	Role	Theatre	Director	Notes
1 - 5 May 2014	Love with a Capital 'L'	John Reith	Traverse Theatre, Edinburgh	Hamish Pirie	play by Tony Cox
4 - 14 October 2023	Group Portrait in a Summer Landscape	Moon	Lyceum Theatre, Edinburgh	David Greig	play by Peter Arnott
5 March - 3 May 2025	Death of a Salesman	Charley	Trafalgar Theatre	Andy Arnold	play by Arthur Miller
