= Fatal Honeymoon =

- Written by: Teena Booth; Mac Gudgeon
- Directed by: Nadia Tass
- Starring: Billy Miller; Amber Clayton; Gary Sweet; Harvey Keitel
- Music by: Robert J. Kral & Robert Upward
- Countries of origin: United States; Australia
- Original language: English

Production
- Producers: David Parker; Nadia Tass
- Editor: Gary Woodyard
- Running time: 99 minutes
- Production company: Lifetime

Original release
- Network: Lifetime
- Release: August 25, 2012

Fatal Honeymoon is a 2012 made-for-television movie directed and produced by Australian filmmaker Nadia Tass. It is said to be based on the true story of the suspicious death of Tina Watson, a twenty-six-year-old American on her honeymoon with Gabe Watson whilst scuba diving near the Great Barrier Reef, Queensland, Australia. As a dramatisation, however, the majority of the movie is not based on known facts from the evidence presented at the various trials or independent investigations.

== Plot ==
Eleven days into their marriage, Alabama couple Gabe Watson and his wife Tina Watson go scuba diving near Australia's Great Barrier Reef, where Tina drowns in what appears to be a freak accident. But her father Tommy Thomas begins to suspect that his daughter's death was by no means an accident, a belief shared by authorities in both United States and Australia, including Detective Gary Campbell. An investigation ensues, as does a media frenzy and a series of legal battles.

== Cast ==
- Billy Miller as Gabe Watson
- Amber Clayton as Tina Watson
- Gemma Forsyth as Alanda McCarthy
- Gary Sweet as Detective Gary Campbell
- Harvey Keitel as Tommy Thomas
- Liz Alexander as Cindy Thomas
- Paul Henri as Ellis
- Brad McMurray as Officer Hantz
- Amanda Muggleton as Glenda Watson
- Kate Jenkinson as Kim Watson
- Alan David Lee as Simmons
- David Roberts as Daniel Samuels

== Release ==
It premiered in the United States on Lifetime on August 25, 2012 and received a cinematic release in Australia in 2014.

== Reception ==
Variety's Geoff Berkshire remarked that with "its strict fidelity to genre cliches and steadfast focus on the true-crime formula, Fatal Honeymoon plays like warmed-over comfort food for armchair detectives. Not even the unexpected presence of Harvey Keitel is enough to distinguish the pic from any number of similar efforts." He further criticized the lack of character depth in the film, commenting that writers Mac Gudgeon and Teena Booth 'seem more interested in dropping clunky references to scuba diving ... rather than providing the characters with any psychological depth or shading. There’s no sense that these stick figures trapped in a by-the-numbers melodrama could be real people swept up in tragic circumstances.

"There’s little for the actors to do other than go through the motions. Keitel has a few flashy scenes as a grieving father, but the largely dull role remains significantly below his skill level." Technically, Berkshire concluded, the film is "in line with low-budget telepic standards."

David Hinckley, of the New York Daily News gave the film two out of five stars, praised the performances of Clayton and Miller, commenting that she "suppresses what we know should be all her legitimate worries while Miller makes Gabe thoroughly unlikable at best and often downright sinister." He surmised that men "tend to be a miserable lot in Lifetime movies, most of them anyway, and it can make for tough viewing. ... In the end, “Fatal Honeymoon” seems vaguely unsatisfying — not because of its conclusion, but because it feels like an extended dramatization that in the end tells us less than a straight news report or documentary could have done. ... Whatever the truth, Gabe should go into Hallmark’s Male Villains Hall of Fame on the first ballot."

Many experienced scuba divers have expressed dissatisfaction with the movie based on claims made in the movie about diving. One of the defense's diving expert witnesses at the Alabama murder trial, Michael McFadyen, has stated that the movie bears little resemblance to what actually occurred and what witness statements say happened.
