= Lianna Rose =

Australian singer–songwriter

Lianna Rose is an Australian singer–songwriter.

== Early life ==
Lianna Rose's love of country music began during her childhood, growing up in the 1970s on the family farm. She was always surrounded by music, and idolised Loretta Lynn. Other musicians to whom she listened, and continued to love, include John Cougar Mellencamp, Suzie Quatro, Tom Petty, Hank Williams, John Prine and Johnny Cash. In adulthood, the list grew to include German heavy metal band Rammstein – to whom she paid tribute with the closing track 'Your Town' on her 2015 album Travellers.

== Career ==
Lianna Rose first took to the stage when she was 14 years old, a self-taught acoustic guitarist. From there, she graduated to playing venues and at events all over Australia.

According to Rose, she began her career as a travelling musician, touring the outback with her first husband and two young children. However, her career breakthrough came when she realised she wanted to write and sing her own songs, rather than performing cover versions of other people's work.

Her early work includes a gig as backing vocalist for Stevie Wright (formerly of The Easybeats).

Signed to Mushroom Music Publishing in 2007, Rose's original songs have appeared on Adam Brand's album Blame it on Eve, Talia Wittmann's debut Reckless Side of Me, and Victoria Baillie's debut Start Brand New.

Her debut album, Soak Up The World released in October 2008, resulted in her first single "Jack" featuring in the Australian film Charlie & Boots starring Paul Hogan and Shane Jacobson. Other songs from the album, "Sugar on It", "Jenny", "Angels", and "Don't Take the Girl", received airplay on Australian soap operas Home and Away and Neighbours.

Rose's third single, "I Want My Tractor Back", resulted in her first top 5 hit single. The music video for her hit single Directed By Ross Wood of 171 Entertainment featured Australia's Rocker Angry Anderson of Rose Tattoo.

== Achievements and honours ==
Winner of The Golden Saddles Award 2009 for Excellence in the Australian Independent Country Music Industry. Winner of the Rising Female Artist Award 2009 Southern Stars Independent Music Awards.

3 Gold Guitar Nominations for 2010 C.M.A.A Awards. Female Artist of the year (Angels), Video Clip of the year (I Want My Tractor Back) New Talent of the year (Jack).
