= Jason Barry =

Irish actor

- Born: 14 December 1972 (age 53); Artane, Dublin, Ireland
- Occupation: Actor
- Years active: 1994–present
- Spouse: Kristin Alayna (m. 2012)
- Children: 2

Jason Barry (born 14 December 1972) is an Irish actor best known for his portrayal of Tommy Ryan in the 1997 film Titanic. He also starred in The Still Life, for which he won numerous awards.

== Early life ==
Jason Barry was born in Artane, Dublin, Ireland. He has two brothers, Keith and Glen.

== Career ==
Barry is a graduate of The Samuel Beckett Center for performing arts at Trinity College, Dublin. His first lead role was in a BBC Film called Screen Two: O Mary This London (1994).

In 1997, he played Tommy Ryan in the film Titanic.

Jason had a recurring role as Dano, a member of the Continuity IRA in the third and fourth seasons of the Irish crime series Love/Hate.

In 2014, Jason played the role of Edgar Willcox in United Passions, a film detailing the history of FIFA. Its release was set to coincide with the beginning of the 2014 World Cup in Brazil.

In 2016, he performed voiceover and motion capture work as Corporal Sean Brooks in Call of Duty: Infinite Warfare, a first-person shooter video game developed by Infinity Ward and published by Activision.

== Personal life ==
Jason Barry has two daughters, Freya Barry, born in 2005, and Nova Barry, born in 2007.

In 2012, Barry married actress Kristin Alayna.

Barry is a Manchester United fan. He is a keen marathon runner.

== Filmography ==
Year	Title	Role	Notes
1994	O Mary This London	Mickey	
1995	Circle of Friends	Nasey Mahon	
1996	The Last of the High Kings	Nelson Fitzgerald	
1997	Titanic	Tommy Ryan	
1998	McCallum	Rory	
1998	Monument Ave.	Seamus	
1999	An Unsuitable Job for a Woman	Mickey	
2000	When the Sky Falls	Dempsey	
2000	Muggers	Gregor O'Reiley	
2000	Metropolis	Alistair Hibbert	
2002	Chaos	Killer	
2002	Man and Boy	Eamon Fish	
2003	Absolute Power	Alan Broadman	
2003	Conspiracy of Silence	David Foley	
2003	Servants	Frank Keneally	
2003	Beyond Re-Animator	Dr. Howard Phillips	
2005	The Baby War	Fergal	
2005	MirrorMask	Valentine	
2005	Whiskey Echo	Dr. Rafe Fletcher	A two part mini-series
2006	Honor (Fists of Rage)	Gabriel	
2006	The Still Life	Julian Lamont	
2008	Bog Bodies	Professor David Wallace	
2008	Valkyrie	SS Officer	uncredited
2009	For Christ's Sake	Father Beckman	
2012	Love/Hate Series 3	Dano	
2013	Love/Hate Series 4	Dano	
2014	United Passions	Edgar Willcox	
2014	Sons of Anarchy	Declan	
2016	I.T	Patrick	
2016	Call of Duty: Infinite Warfare	Corporal Brooks	Video Game

=== Video games ===
- Call of Duty: Infinite Warfare (2016) – Corporal Sean Brooks
- Call of Duty: Modern Warfare (2019) – Additional Voices
- Call of Duty: Modern Warfare II (2022) – Declan O'Conor
