= Ritchie Singer =

Australian actor

- Born: Australia

Ritchie Singer is an Australian actor.

Singer portrayed executive producer Richard Shapiro in the fictionalized 2005 American television movie/docudrama Dynasty: The Making of a Guilty Pleasure, based on the creation and behind the scenes production of the 1980s prime time soap opera Dynasty. He also played Terence James 'Terry' Madigan in season three of the Australian police procedural Water Rats (1998).

Singer graduated from NIDA in 1983.

== Filmography ==
=== Film ===
Year	Title	Role	Type
2013	Charlie's Country	Darwin Doctor	Feature film
2013	Rapture-Palooza	Reverend Rick Forrest / Preacher	Feature film
2007	La Croix	Assassin	Short film
2001	The Man Who Sued God	Sam Cohen	Feature film
1989	Blotto	Harry Zilco	Short film
1999	Paperback Hero	Rob Thomas	Feature film
1998	Terra Nova	Rob	Feature film
1998	Dark City	Hotel Manager / Kiosk Vendor	Feature film
1997	Blackrock	Mr Kamen	Feature film
1995	Mighty Morphin; Power Rangers	MC	Feature film
1991	Till There Was You	Robbo	Feature film
1989	Cappucino	Bollinger	Feature film
1988	Two Brothers Running	Ben	Feature film
1987	Those Dear Departed (aka Ghosts Can Do It!	Gordon	Feature film
1987	Incident at Raven's Gate	Richard Cleary	Feature film
1986	Crocodile Dundee	Con	Feature film
1985	Bliss	Waiter	Feature film

=== Television ===
Year	Title	Role	Type
2018	Reckoning	Dr Chaudhary	TV series
2017	Home and Away	Magistrate	TV series
2017	A Place to Call Home	Rabbi Cohen	TV series
2011	Crownies	Justice Rosenberg	TV series
2009	Gruen Transfer	Doctor Earnest	TV series
2008	Australia Welcomes Snoop Dogg	Bob Hardcastle	
2004	Dynasty: The Making of a Guilty Pleasure	Richard Shapiro	TV movie
1999	Airtight	Louie Lugarno	TV movie
1998	Kings in Grass Castles	Sam Emmanuel	TV miniseries
1998	Water Rats	Terry Madigan	TV series, season 3
1998	Blue Heelers	Justin De Carlo	TV series
1990	Fresh Start	Doctor Rogers	TV series
1989	Police Rescue	Daryl	TV series
1988	Mission Impossible	Youseff K	TV series
1988	The Flying Doctors	Barney Splatt	TV series
1987	Rafferty's Rules	Mr Yilmaz	TV series
1986	G.P.	Barry Lasker	TV series
1986	The Last Warhorse	Lassiter	TV movie
1985	Palace of Dreams	Myer	TV miniseries
1985	Shout	Max Moore	
1984	Sons and Daughters	Minder	TV series

== Stage ==
Year	Title	Role	Type
2019–21	West Side Story	Doc	Opera Australia world tour
2002	Cox Four	Weasel Covert	NIDA
1999	Laughter on the 23rd Floor	Val Skolsky	Ensemble Theatre
1993	Love Muscle	Fraser	NIDA
	A Flea In Her Ear / Don Carlos		NIDA
1992	Six Degrees of Separation	Dr Feine	STC
1992	I Hate Hamlet	Gary Peter Lefkowitz	Diana Bliss Prodns
1990	The Odd Couple	Manolo Costazuela	John Nicholls
1989	Death of a Salesman	Willy Loman	STC
1989	Man, Beast and Virtue	Dr Alpachio / Grisoldi	Newtown Players
1988	Silence / A Slight Ache	Jonathan / Roger	Lookout Theatre
1988	Cowgirls and Indians	Big Ralph	NIDA
1988	Conversations with Jesus	Rev Ledbeater	NIDA
1988	A Streetcar Named Desire	Steve Hubbell	
1986	Hamlet	Polonius / Gravedigger	Q Theatre
1986	Sweet Bird of Youth	Bud	Wilton Morley Productions
1985	The Dance of Death	The Lieutenant	STC
1984	Trafford Tanzi	The Ref	Theatre ACT
1984	The Department	Hans	Theatre ACT
1982	Limited Edition	Writer/Performer	STC

== Radio ==
Year	Title	Role	Type
2001	The Time is Not Yet Ripe	Mr Western	

== TVC ==
Year	Details	Role	Production
2016	BCF	Boss	The Sweet Shop, Nick Kelly
2013	Nando's	Costa	Plaza Films, Paul Middleditch
2010–11	First National Real Estate	Gary Bilson Agent	Plaza Films, Paul Middleditch
2011	Betfair Plaza	Interviewer	Dave Kleber
2007	Flashbeer	Panel Judge	Plaza Films for Carlton Draught, Paul Middleditch
1985	Why Dinnya Call?	Ritchie	Telecom
1984	Supa Cloth	Dad	Fink Productions, Fred Fink
