= The Divorce (TV series) =

Television series

- Soundtrack cover art
- Genre: Comedy; Opera
- Written by: Joanna Murray-Smith
- Directed by: Dean Murphy
- Composer: Elena Kats-Chernin
- Country of origin: Australia
- Original language: English
- No. of series: 1
- No. of episodes: 4

Production
- Executive producer: Christopher Gist
- Producer: Andrea Denholm
- Cinematography: Roger Lanser
- Running time: 4×30 minutes
- Production companies: Princess Pictures; Opera Australia

Original release
- Network: ABC
- Release: 7 December – 10 December 2015

The Divorce is an Australian comedy opera miniseries which was broadcast on ABC TV on four successive nights from 7 to 10 December 2015. The four-part series is written by Joanna Murray-Smith with music by Elena Kats-Chernin. Based on an original idea by Lyndon Terracini, it was developed by Opera Australia and directed for television by Dean Murphy. Outside filming took place at Werribee Park Mansion west of Melbourne. The work was shown again in 2017 in a single 95-minute broadcast on Sky Arts and ABC TV.

== Plot ==
Wealthy couple Iris (Marina Prior) and art critic Jed (John O'May) are happily getting a divorce and throwing an elaborate party. By the end of the evening, Iris and Jed's divorce has triggered a renegotiation of all certainties and the characters are set on an unanticipated course. Louise (Lisa McCune), the younger sister of Iris is secretly in love with art critic Jed. Toby (Hugh Sheridan) is an aspiring artist, hired to work as a waiter at the party. William (Matthew McFarlane) is Iris' young and handsome lover, an accountant who lacks charisma. Caroline (Kate Miller-Heidke) is Jed and Iris' personal assistant who is in trouble with loan sharks Alfie and Ludo. Patrick (Peter Cousens) and Ellen (Melissa Madden Gray) are the best friends of Jed and Iris.

== Cast ==
- Lisa McCune as Louise
- Marina Prior as Iris
- Hugh Sheridan as Toby
- Kate Miller-Heidke as Caroline
- John O'May as Jed
- Matthew McFarlane as William
- Peter Cousens as Patrick
- Melissa Madden Gray as Ellen
- Christopher Kirby as Dre
- Bob Franklin as Alfie, a loan shark
- Jane Allsop as police officer
- Dom Phelan as Ludo, a loan shark
- Nick Capper, the courier

== Soundtrack ==
The Divorce

Soundtrack album by soloists as above, Opera Australia Orchestra and Chorus, conducted by Vanessa Scammell
- Released: 31 March 2016
- Label: Universal Music Australia

Universal Music Australia partnered with the production company, Princess Pictures, to release the soundtrack to The Divorce. Elena Kats-Chernin's score was nominated for the 2016 AACTA Award for Best Original Music Score in Television and for ARIA Award for Best Original Soundtrack, Cast or Show Album at the 2016 ARIA Music Awards.

=== Track listing ===
1. Overture
2. Goodbye My Love – Marina Prior, John O'May
3. They Had Perfection – Chorus
4. Chilling Champagne – Kate Miller-Heidke
5. Greetings – Chorus
6. Other Ships – Marina Prior, Kate Miller-Heidke
7. Love and Fear – Melissa Madden Gray, Peter Cousens
8. Cosmopolitan Penguin – Hugh Sheridan
9. Tick Tock – Lisa McCune
10. Have you Lost All Love for Jed – Lisa McCune, Marina Prior
11. Sister, Sister – Lisa McCune
12. Company, Canapés, Drinks – Chorus
13. Love Love Bitter – Chorus
14. At Last – Lisa McCune
15. Dismemberment – Kate Miller Heidke, Matthew MacFarlane
16. Appetites – Kate Miller-Heidke
17. Old Friend, Congratulations – Melissa Madden Gray, Peter Cousens
18. The Proposal – Marina Prior
19. Cradle Snatchers – Chorus
20. What's Going On, What Did She Say – Chorus
21. No More Notes/I Cannot Wait – Lisa McCune
22. What's Going On With Caroline – Chorus
23. Grizzly Remains – Kate Miller-Heidke
24. I've Told Lou – John O'May
25. The Way the Light Plays – Lisa McCune, Hugh Sheridan
26. As a Child – Matthew MacFarlane
27. The Key – Melissa Madden Gray, Matthew MacFarlane
28. The Waiter – Lisa McCune
29. No Gentle Way – Lisa McCune
30. Hail Jehovah! – Melissa Madden Gray, Peter Cousens, Matthew MacFarlene, Marina Prior, Lisa McCune, Kate Miller-Heidke, Hugh Sheridan, Chorus
31. The Fitting Glove – Hugh Sheridan
32. A Charismatic Force – Marina Prior, John O'May
33. You Laughed, You Kissed – Chorus
