= Rob Carlton =

Australian actor and writer

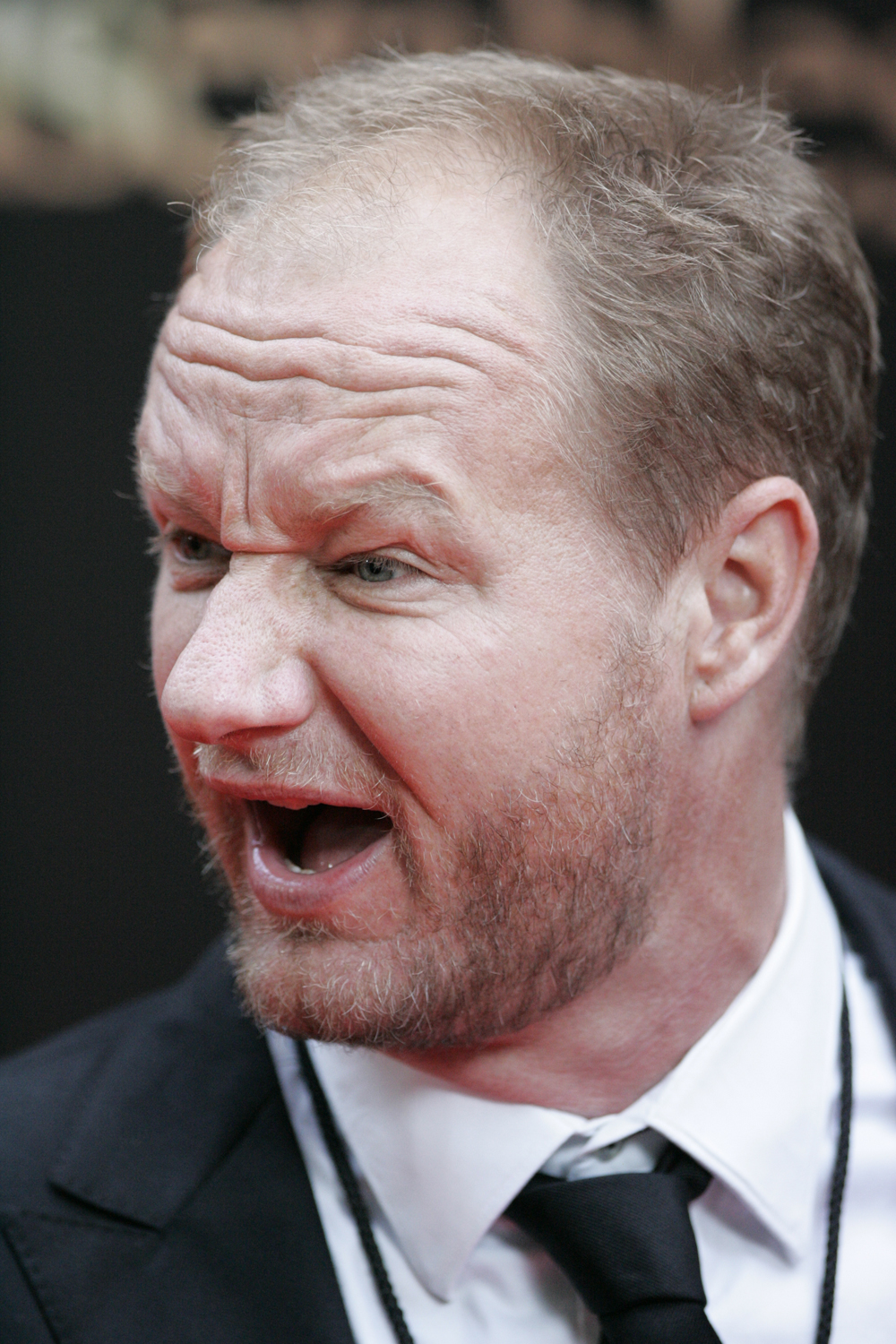
- Carlton at the premiere of Les Misérables in Sydney in December 2012
- Born: Robert Carlton; 4 May 1971 (age 55)
- Occupation: Actor
- Years active: 1986–present
- Spouse: Adrienne Ferreira
- Children: Jim Carlton; Leo Carlton
- Father: Jim Carlton

Rob Carlton (born 4 May 1971) is a Logie Award winning Australian actor and writer. He is best known for writing and starring in the comedy series Chandon Pictures. He also had a role in the comedy satire The Hollowmen, and a starring role in Netflix's Boy Swallows Universe, the television adaptation of the novel of the same name. His father was Jim Carlton, Australian businessman, politician, and humanitarian.

== Career ==
Carlton has been a professional actor since the age of 14 and has appeared in many television series from Young Ramsay to A Country Practice, Home and away, Blue Heelers, Water Rats, Fireflies, McLeod's Daughters and All Saints. He has also appeared in many movies including Emu Runner, Strange Bedfellows, You Can't Stop the Murders and The Year My Voice Broke. Carlton trained with the Australian Theatre for Young People in Sydney, Australia for many years learning the foundations of acting for screen and stage.

In the mid-1990s, Carlton was living in Los Angeles. He accepted the role of continuity coordinator for an Australian film in Melbourne.

Carlton starred in the short film Carmichael & Shane, which was the winner of Tropfest in 2006. He also wrote, co-produced and co-directed the film. He co-starred with his real-life twin sons Jim and Leo, who played the title characters Carmichael and Shane. He also won the award for Best Male Actor.

In April 2011, Carlton starred in the Australian Broadcasting Corporation's Paper Giants: The Birth of Cleo as the acerbic and charismatic king of Australian media, Kerry Packer. The mini-series rated strongly over two nights on 17 and 18 April 2011 and his performance, along with co-star Asher Keddie as Ita Buttrose, was well received by audiences and critics alike. In April 2012, he won a Silver Logie Award for his performance in the role.

Carlton had a supporting role in the 2012 Australian comedy Any Questions for Ben?, created by Working Dog Productions. He also played a role in the TV series Conspiracy 365.

Additionally, Carlton is a professional speaker, who has worked as a master of ceremonies, compère, facilitator and motivational speaker.

== Filmography ==
=== Film ===
Year	Title	Role	Notes	Ref
1986	The Last Warhorse	Ray	TV movie	
1987	High Tide	Pinball Boy	Feature film	
1987	The Year My Voice Broke	Pierdon	Feature film	
1991	Gotcha	Surfer	Short film	
1992	Nemesis	Waiter	Feature film	
1994	Cody: Bad Love	Slipper	TV movie	
1996	Boys	Tom Vare	Feature film	
1997	Barry and Garry	Passing man	Short film	
1998	Venus Factory	Cush		
1999	Strange Fits of Passion	Blackson	Feature film	
2000	Muggers	Freddie	Feature film	
2001	The Finder	Wheels	TV movie	
2003	You Can't Stop the Murders	Barry	Feature film	
2004	Shank	Michael	Short film	
2004	Strange Bedfellows	Monique	Feature film	
2005	The Writer	Detective Stone	Short film	
2006	How Many Doctors Does it Take to Change a Lightbulb?	Doctor	Short film	
2006	Carmichael & Shane	Angus Wilson	Short film - winner of Tropfest in 2006. Also wrote, co-produced and co-directed.	
2012	How Many More Doctors Does it Take to Change a Lightbulb?	Doctor	Short film	
2012	Mabo	Paddy Killoran	TV movie	
2012	Mental	Jack		
2012	Any Questions for Ben?	Ben’s Dad	Feature film	
2014	Parer’s War	Ken G. Hall	TV movie	
2015	Super Awesome!	Kim Devine		
2017	Melon Grab	Dad	Short film	
2018	Riot	Jack Mundey	TV movie	
2018	Emu Runner	Stan	Feature film	
2020	The Very Excellent Mr. Dundee	Father	Feature film	
2020	Sweet River	Wilkins		
2022	Svengali	Detective Hester	Short film	
2025	Dangerous Animals	Dave	Feature film	
2025	Kangaroo	Ted		
2026	Apex	Hunter		

=== Television ===
Year	Title	Role	Notes	Ref
1977-80	Young Ramsay		TV series	
1985-1993	A Country Practice	Pete / Budgie Markham / Gerry Barnes / Grant Frazer	TV series - 11 episodes	
1988	Joe Wilson	Tommy Spicer	TV miniseries - 2 episodes	
1989	E Street	Keith Bradley	TV series - 2 episodes	
1991	Police Rescue	Young Prisoner	TV series - 1 episode	
1991	Home and Away	Graham	TV series - 2 episodes	
1995	Janus	Brett Hayes	TV series - 1 episode	
1995	Spellbinder	Biker	TV series - 1 episode	
1995	Eat My Shorts	Noel		
1997	Roar	Morvern	TV series - 1 episode	
1998-2001	Water Rats	David ‘Kiwi Dave’ Crowe / Barry Elliot	TV series - 3 episodes	
1999-2006	All Saints	Hodgie / Ray Price / Col Beaty	TV series - 3 episodes	
2000	Farscape	Vija	TV series - 1 episode	
2001	Blue Heelers	Barry Lancer	TV series - 2 episodes	
2001	Do or Die	Gavin Kovacs	TV miniseries	
2001	McLeod's Daughters	Jed	TV series - 1 episode	
2003	Ocean Star	Reg Davies	TV series - 11 episodes	
2004	Fireflies	Kewie Holman	TV series - 2 episodes	
2007-09	Chandon Pictures	Tom Chandon	TV series - 16 episodes. Also creator, director & producer.	
2008	The Hollowmen	Kenny Pratt	TV series - 3 episodes	
2010	Underbelly: The Golden Mile	Neville ‘Scully’ Scullion	TV series - 10 episodes	
2011	Paper Giants: The Birth of Cleo	Kerry Packer	TV miniseries	
2012	Conspiracy 365	Vulkan Sligo	TV miniseries	
2012	A Moody Christmas	Elliot	TV miniseries - 1 episode	
2016	Rake	Anders	TV series - 1 episode	
2017	Kiki and Kitty	Bryce the Ice Man	TV series – 4 episodes	
2018	True Story with Hamish & Andy	Officer Campbell	TV series - 1 episode	
2018	Wanted	Karl Brady	TV series - season 3, 4 episodes	
2021	Total Control	George Jeffries	TV series - 6 episodes	
2022	Bali 2002	Robert Daniels	TV miniseries	
2022-23	Black Snow	Victor Bianchi	TV series - 6 episodes	
2023	Last King of the Cross	The Fixer	TV miniseries	
2023	North Shore	Lloyd Macklin	TV miniseries	
2023	Caught	Tony Barber	2 episodes	
2024	Boy Swallows Universe	Brian Robertson	5 episodes	
2025	The White Lotus	Rupert	1 episode	
2026	The Killings at Parrish Station	Snr Inspector Charlie Lockwood	6 episodes	
2026	Return to Paradise	Bob Shank	1 Episode (1.6 ' Vote 1 Murder')	

== Audiobooks ==
Year	Title	Role
2020	I Catch Killers: The Life And Many Deaths Of A Homicide Detective by Gary Jubelin	Narrator

== Personal life ==
Carlton is married to Adrienne Ferreira, an author, who wrote the book Watercolours. The couple lives in Avoca Beach, New South Wales with their twin sons, Jim and Leo Carlton.

Carlton spent some of his early years on Sydney's Northern Beaches, and attended Mona Vale Public School.
