= For Christ's Sake =

2011 comedy film

For Christ's Sake is a 2011 comedy film directed by Jackson Douglas, produced by Will Raee, written by Jeff Lewis and starring Alex Borstein.

== Plot ==
This film is about a small-town priest named Robert, who finds out his estranged brother greatly needs money for cancer treatment. He secretly borrows from the church emergency fund and lends it to his brother, but later finds out his brother used the money to finance a pornographic movie.

== Release ==
The film released on DVD on December 6, 2011.

== Cast ==
- Sara Rue as Candy
- Alex Borstein as Mrs. Marcus
- Will Sasso as Alan
- Ike Barinholtz as Buster Cherry
- William Morgan Sheppard as Father Monahan
- Armin Shimerman as The Pope
- Kyle Bornheimer as Tony
- Jed Rees as Robert
- Michael Hitchcock as Tom
- Judith Shekoni as Mia do'em
- Chad Willett as Sid
- Jason Barry as Father Beckman
- Scott L. Schwartz as Gordy
- Nicola Charles as Mary Murphy
- Matt Champagne as Carl
- David Dean Bottrell as Sam
- Paul Vato as Lance The Sound Guy
