= Richard Morgan (actor) =

Australian actor (1958–2006)

- Born: Richard Howard Morgan; 12 August 1958; Hobart, Tasmania
- Died: 23 December 2006 (aged 48); Melbourne, Victoria
- Resting place: Korumburra cemetery
- Occupation: Actor
- Years active: 1974–1990, 1999–2004
- Known for: The Sullivans as Terry Sullivan (1976–1983); Sons and Daughters as Alan Brandon (1984–1985); Stingers as Reg 'The Ferret' Masters (1999-2004)
- Spouse(s): Lisa Morgan (m. 19??)
- Children: 2

Richard Howard Morgan (12 August 1958 – 23 December 2006) was an Australian actor. He was most famous for playing the long-running role of Terry Sullivan in the Australian television series The Sullivans.

== Early career ==
After watching a film crew shooting a scene from a television series in his street—and observing the average performance of a child actor similar to his own age—Morgan decided that "he could do better than that" and got himself an acting agent and started going for auditions.

His professional career began when he was cast in guest roles in Crawford Productions television series Homicide (in 1975) and Solo One (1976).

After roles in the motion pictures The Devil's Playground and Break of Day (both 1976), Morgan became one of the original cast members of the hit television series The Sullivans, produced by Crawford Productions. Morgan played Terry Sullivan, the third and youngest Sullivan son. A scampish schoolboy at the beginning of the series, as he matured he harboured dreams of joining the air force, however inner-ear problems prevented this and he instead joined the army. He later married Caroline, however the war took a greater psychological toll on Terry than his brothers, and he struggled both with his marriage and his readjustment to civilian life. Terry was indirectly responsible for the death of his father Dave at the conclusion of the series.

Although the show contained soap-staple storylines, the war backdrop allowed for more serious moments than normally seen in Aussie soaps. It screened on Australian television from 1976 to 1983.

After the series ended, other motion picture roles followed, including the hit Phar Lap (1983) about the racehorse of the same name, and in Innocent Prey and Silver City (both 1984). He also appeared in the television film Outback Vampires, opposite Brett Climo, in 1987.

After this came a role in the Sydney-based television series Sons and Daughters in 1984, and guest roles in drama series like A Country Practice (1987), Home and Away (1989) and female cop drama Skirts (1990).

During this period he also acted in television movies and miniseries including D.H. Lawrence's The Boy in the Bush (1984 miniseries starring Kenneth Branagh and Sigrid Thornton); Great Expectations: The Untold Story (1986 telemovie directed by Tim Burstall) and The Charmer (1987 miniseries starring Nigel Havers).

He featured as 'Stretch' Lewis in the 1989 US picture Farewell to the King directed by John Milius, starring alongside Nick Nolte, James Fox and Nigel Havers.

== Later life ==
After a break of a number of years—when he got heavily involved in the booming computer business—Morgan returned to acting with guest roles in Australian television series such as Neighbours in 2000, Blue Heelers in 2000, Something in the Air in 2000, and the ABC-TV series MDA in 2002.

He gained a new generation of fans when he joined the cast of the popular Nine Network undercover cop series Stingers, where he played the recurring role of Reg 'The Ferret' Masters from 1999-2004.

== Death ==
In 2005 Morgan was diagnosed with motor neuron disease (MND / ALS) and died from the illness eighteen months later, on 23 December 2006.

He was survived by his wife Lisa and daughters Ella and Zoe.

== Filmography ==
=== Film ===
Year	Title	Role	Notes
1976	The Devil's Playground	Smith	
1976	Break of Day	John	
1983	Phar Lap	'Cashy' Martin	
1984	Silver City	Dan	
1984	Innocent Prey	Ted	
1989	Farewell to the King	'Stretch' Lewis	

=== Television ===
Year	Title	Role	Notes
1975	Homicide	Jamie Wright	1 episode
1976	Solo One	Timmy Savage	1 episode
1976–1983	The Sullivans	Terry Sullivan	1114 episodes
1984	The Boy in the Bush	Herbert	Miniseries, 3 episodes
1984–1985	Sons and Daughters	Alan Brandon	30 episodes
1986	The Last Warhorse	Bob	TV movie
1987	Great Expectations: The Untold Story	Pryce	TV movie
1987	The Charmer	Birdwatcher	Miniseries, 1 episode
1987	Outback Vampires (aka The Wicked)	Nick	TV movie
1987	A Country Practice	Wayne Baker	2 episodes
1989	Home and Away	James Donoghue	4 episodes
1990	Skirts	Burrell	1 episode
1991	Chances	Michael Tranzi	1 episode
2000	Blue Heelers	Peter Stamford	1 episode
2000	Neighbours	Damon Gaffney	6 episodes
2000	Something in the Air	Miles Middlemass	3 episodes
2001	Blonde	Buddy 2	Miniseries, 2 episodes
2002	MDA	Dr John Baldwin	1 episode
1999–2004	Stingers	Detective Senior Sergeant Reg 'The Ferret' Masters	38 episodes

== Stage ==
Year	Title	Role	Notes
1968	Sweethearts		Arts Theatre, Adelaide with The Metropolitan Light Opera Company of South Australia
1970	Salad Days	Timothy	Arts Theatre, Adelaide with Metropolitan Musical Theatre Company
1984	What About the Bond?	David	Not Another Theatre Company, Sydney
1984	Zombie Barbeque		Not Another Theatre Company, Sydney
1985	The Heiress from Punchbowl		Sydney Sailors' Home with Not Another Theatre Company
1989	Oh, What a Lovely War!		Price Theatre, Adelaide with Centre for the Performing Arts
1991	Tales from the Decameron		NIDA Parade Theatre, Sydney
1991	Serious Money		NIDA Parade Theatre, Sydney
