= Ingrid Lacey =

British actress (born 1958)

Ingrid Marcella Lacey (born 6 November 1958) is a British actress. She is known for her role as Julia in Series 2 of London's Burning, Helen Cooper in the Channel 4 sitcom Drop the Dead Donkey (1993–98). Her film appearances include Funny Man (1994), In Love and War (1996) and The Cat's Meow (2001).

== Career ==
Lacey is best known for her role as Helen Cooper in Drop the Dead Donkey. She was born in Surrey and educated at Godalming College and trained at the Bristol Old Vic Theatre School, graduating in 1981. She has acted in films, radio, TV series and theatre productions, such as Lolly Susi's Gone to LA at the Hampstead Theatre, London, where she had to shave her head for her role of a woman suffering from breast cancer and in The Knight of the Burning Pestle. She has also appeared at the Royal Court Theatre in the productions Blood and Our Late Night. In 2007, she was in the Bush Theatre's production of Elling, which transferred to the Trafalgar Studios, while in 2011, she appeared as Tricia in Brad Fraser's 5 @ 50, at the Royal Exchange Theatre, Manchester.

== Filmography ==
- The Cat's Meow (2001) as Jessica Barham
- In Love and War (1996) as Elsie 'Mac' MacDonald
- Funny Man (1994) as Tina Taylor (UK title: Funnyman)

== Theatre ==
- Desdemona: A Play About A Handkerchief (2014) - Emilia (Park Theatre, London)
- The Astronaut's Chair (2012) - Renee (Drum Theatre, Plymouth)
- 5 @ 50 (2011) - Tricia (Royal Enchange Theatre, Manchester)
- Elling - (2007) ( Bush Theatre, Trafalgar Studios ), London
- Knight of the Burning Pestle (2005) - Citizen's Wife (Young Vic, London; Mercury Theatre, Colchester)
- Blood (2003) - Madeleine (Royal Court Theatre, London)
- Gone To LA (2000) - Ella (Hampstead Theatre, London)
- Our Late Night (1999) - Kristin (Royal Court Theatre, London)
- After the Rain - (Gate Theatre, Dublin, Ireland)
- The Killing Of Sister George
- Charley's Aunt
- The Comedy Of Errors
- The Lion, The Witch And The Wardrobe as The Witch
- The History Of Mr Polly
- The Resistible Rise Of Arturo Ui (Bristol Old Vic)
- The Country Wife (Bristol Old Vic)
- Widowers' Houses (1981) (Bristol Old Vic)
- The Railway Children (Oldham Coliseum)

== Television filmography ==
- New Tricks (2013) as Jane Harlow
- Skins (2011) as Catherine Creevey
- Tracy Beaker Returns - "Moving On" (episode 13) (2010) as the Editor
- The Bill (2009) as Jilley S. 25 Ep. 10 & 11
- Casualty
  - Animals (2005) as Helen Wilder
  - Free Fall (1999) as Chrissie Holman
- The Last Detective - episode #1.1 (2003) as Roxanne Palmer
- Heartbeat - "Honor Among Thieves" (1999) as Honor Gale
- Getting Hurt (1998) (TV) as Helen Cross
- Pie in the Sky - "Game Pie" (1996) as Cynthia Hoskins
- The Bill - "Ties That Bind" (1995) as Jane Grant
- Look at the State We're In! (1995) (miniseries) as Sally
- Master of the Moor (1994) (TV)
- The Chief (1994) (TV) As Alison Dell
- Drop the Dead Donkey (1990) as Helen Cooper (1993–1998)
- A Woman's Guide to Adultery (1993) (TV) as Helen
- Harry Enfield's Television Programme
  - Episode #2.4 (1992)
  - Episode #2.5 (1992)
- She-Wolf of London (other title: Love & Curses) - "Moonlight Becomes You" (1990) as Diane
- Never Come Back (1990) (TV) as Sarah
- The Endless Game (1990) (TV) as Inga
- Saracen (1989) TV series as Alice
- Inspector Morse - "Last Bus to Woodstock" (1988) as Mary Widdowson
- The Two of Us - "Getting Better" (1987) as Tina
- Northanger Abbey (1987) (TV) as Eleanor Tilney
- Thunder Rock (1985) (TV) as Melanie
- London's Burning (1989)

== Radio ==
- Church Angels
- The Freedom Tapes (1995)
- That Girl In Twenty Seven (1982)

== Video game ==
- Star Wars: Knights of the Old Republic II - The Sith Lords (2004) (VG) (voice) - Additional voices (US short title: Star Wars: KOTOR II)
