= Arena Theatre Company =

Australian theatre company

Arena Theatre Company is an Australian theatre company and a long-running producers of Theatre For Young Audiences. It was established as a professional company in 1968 as the Children's Arena Theatre and focused primarily on schools performances.

In 2017, Arena moved its base from Melbourne to Bendigo and now a resident company at Bendigo Venues and Events' Engine Room.

== History ==
=== 1996-1970 ===
Arena Theatre Company began in 1966 when founder Naomi Marks, despondent by the lack of appropriate children's theatre, travelled overseas to "find out what was happening for children in the rest of the world". She was particularly impressed by the work of The Theatre Centre in London, and brought back The Crossroads by Brian Way to perform in Australia. Along with Elaine Clark, Robin Ramsay and Anne Sutherland, they created the Toorak Players Children's Theatre and performed The Crossroads on 18 May 1966 at the Mackenzie Theatre attached to the Toorak Presbyterian Church.

In June 1968, the Toorak Players Children's Theatre became known as Children's Arena Theatre as the team formed the professional theatre company.

Marks was very insistent in these early days that Children's Arena Theatre plays be educational as well as entertaining as she noted "I don't want the cast to go to the schools, leave after the performances and then be forgotten. It should not be a wasted few hours and purely entertainment for the children. I want them to become involved. I want drama to become part of the junior school curriculum....just so long as they benefit from it. Drama develops a child...drama can bring so much life to schooling.

=== 1970-1980 ===
Children's Arena Theatre (CAT) appointed their first artistic director in 1970, Roger Moulton from England. He migrated to Australia because of the exciting potential of children's theatre here. Moulton remained with CAT until 1972, during which time he directed a number of shows for the company including Brian Way's play, The Discoverers.

By 1973 CAT had secured ongoing funding from both the federal and state governments. On the basis of this, the company decided to appoint a full-time artistic director. It appointed David Young, a member of the Belgrade Theatre, Coventry, theatre-in-education team, a playwright and trained drama teacher. He took up the position in September 1973 and remained with the company for two years.

During 1974 Young secured a special grant from the Australia Council to set up a sub-company within CAT that was called Common Ground. This sub-company performed only for Melbourne's inner-city state schools, for which its work was provided free of charge - as was the case with the Belgrade's theatre-in-education team. The first project that Young developed for Common Ground was Eureka, a two-hour show based on events leading up to the 1853 Battle of Eureka Stockade. It was designed for an audience of a single class of upper primary school students, who were physically involved throughout the production. Eureka opened in February 1974 and played in about 40 Melbourne primary schools.

During Young's directorship of the company, he also directed shows for the main (charging) wing of CAT, including Simon Hopkinson's secondary school play, The Wreck of the Corsair, and Grazyna Monvid's The Battle of Lumbertub's Lane. The latter was performed in the Viaduct Theatre, South Yarra, which CAT took over and converted to an arena theatre in June 1974.

In 1975 John O’May took over as artistic director. He had previously been working as an actor with CAT in the Common Grounds project. He promoted Australian content, and in 1976 CAT developed an all Australian program for the primary school tour throughout the year.

Peter Tulloch, a former actor with CAT took over as artistic director in 1977 and expanded the holiday programs and workshops. Arena also began to umbrella small up and coming companies such as Bow-Tie and Mixed Company. 1981 saw Peter Charlton take charge and began reinstating high quality production values and increased theatre productions.

=== 1980-1990 ===
In 1982 Children's Arena Theatre shortened their name to Arena Theatre to remove the reference to children, which was limiting them from performing to secondary schools. Director Trina Parker explained " It was a deliberate....attempt to take away the...[patronising label] and be able to do plays for upper secondary. We found it very difficult to sell plays to secondary schools under the title Children's Arena Theatre because secondary kids do not regard themselves as children".

=== 1990-2000 ===
In 1996, Rosemary Myers designed an ambitious creative project entitled AnthroPOPtrilogy, which consisted of three separate plays, Autopsy, Mass and Panacaea. She collaborated with Bruce Gladwin, Hugh Covill and Julienne O’Brien to create these works. This hybrid theatre focused on projection techniques, kinetic art, amplified music and fragmented narrative. In 1999, Arena received the Honorary President's Award of the International Association of Theatre for Children and Young People (ASSITEJ). The judging panel for the award cited Arena's multimedia approach as indicative of a new direction for theatre for young people.

=== 2000-2010 ===
Rosemary Myers left the company in 2008 and was succeeded by Chris Kohn, former Artistic Associate.".

=== 2025 ===
As of 2025, Arena’s CEO is Debra Allanson, and Chair is Abe Watson
