= Muggers (film) =

- DVD cover
- Directed by: Dean Murphy
- Written by: Robert Taylor
- Starring: Matt Day; Jason Barry; Nicola Charles
- Release date: 25 May 2000
- Country: Australia
- Language: English
- Budget: A$4 million
- Box office: A$13,372

Muggers is a 2000 Australian black comedy about two medical students who are falling behind in their studies through lack of money. They become involved in the theft of kidneys from recently deceased bodies, in competition with a pair of ambulance paramedics who are running a similar racket.

== Plot ==
Two medical students - Brad and Gregor - live in a shabby apartment and owe a large sum of money to Mr. Rogers, a loan shark. Their grades are slipping, and they are warned by Professor Lawrence about being expelled if they don't pass their exams.

One night, Brad and Gregor sneak into Prof. Lawrence's office, and overhear him speaking with Dr. Browning's need for organs towards transplant operations. Later, the boys watch a man's body fall from a building to his death and in the pretext of saving his life, they steal his kidney and sell it to Dr. Browning, and buy themselves a sumptuous meal with the profits. Meanwhile, two paramedics who take custody of the dead body notice that the right kidney was cut out surgically.

Emboldened by the first organ sale, Brad and Gregor find a drunkard at a club and steal his kidney. They sell the second kidney to Dr. Browning, who informs the paramedics about the purchase, indicating new competition in the organ trade business. Brad and Gregor also mug a man and steal his kidney, but while fleeing the scene, are spotted by the same paramedics. The police are puzzled by the mugging, as the man's wallet and car aren't stolen, but the paramedics notice that the victim is missing a kidney.

With newfound wealth, Gregor suggests they visit call girls. Brad agrees to see one called Veronica, but is surprised to find that it's actually his classmate Sophie, who is doing this on the side to pay for her college fees. Brad and Gregor need only one more kidney to become fully free of debt, and decide to steal their landlord's kidney. However, while browsing their landlord's medical file on the hospital computer, they are observed by nurse Armstrong. After they knock out their landlord and steal his kidney, the loan shark's gangsters mistakenly throw the landlord down the stairs, severely injuring him. When handing over the third kidney to Dr. Browning, Brad correctly surmises that the liver is for the doctor himself, who confesses that he has cancer of the liver. The landlord is taken to the hospital, where nurse Armstrong recognizes his name on the computer and alerts the paramedics.

Prof. Lawrence informs Brad and Gregor that they have passed the exam, and they celebrate that evening. The next day, at a golf course, the paramedics arrive and assault Gregor, threatening him if he's found trafficking in kidneys in the future. Detectives arrive at the boys' apartment asking questions about a neighbor and landlord assaulted with a golf club, but leave without suspecting anything.

Mr. Rogers goes to the hospital for a routine check-up and is seen by nurse Armstrong. While they are having sex, he suddenly dies of a heart attack and the nurse calls the paramedics to take out his liver. But Brad and Gregor get there earlier, steal the liver just in time to save Dr. Browning's life. The boys go back to their apartment, where the gangsters are hiding to beat them up, but the paramedics also get there and they all start fighting each other. The detectives finally arrive to stop the fighting and pin the landlord's death on the gangsters.

At the college graduation, Gregor wins the golf championship and Brad wins the college medal.

== Cast ==
- Matt Day as Brad Forrest
- Jason Barry as Gregor O’Reiley
- Nicola Charles as Belinda
- Rod Mullinar as Marcus Browning
- Marshall Napier as Charles Lawrence
- Simon Bossell as Nigel Stamford-Street
- Petra Yared as Sophie
- Caroline Gillmer as Nurse Armstrong
- Reg Evans as Albert Crawford
- Chris Haywood as George Roy Rogers
- Frank Gallacher as Det Sgt Kernahan
- Natalie Mendoza as Tran
- Rob Carlton as Freddie

== Home media ==
Muggers was released on DVD by Magna Pacific.
