= Paul Henri (actor) =

Australian-American actor, director and entrepreneur

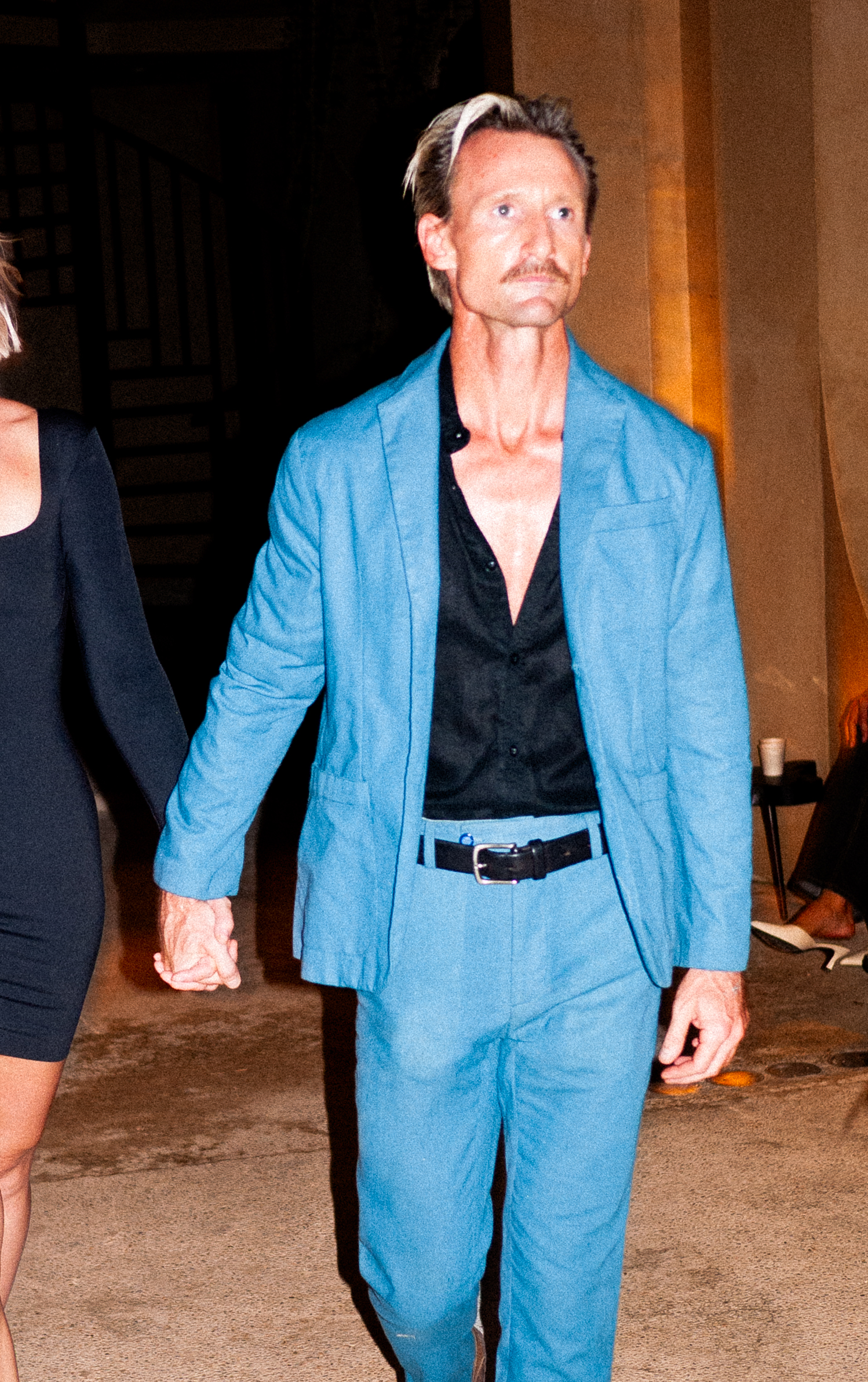
- Henri in 2025
- Born: California, U.S.
- Citizenship: American, Australian
- Occupations: Actor; Director
- Notable work: Run South; Wentworth; Fatal Honeymoon; No Hard Feelings

Paul Henri is an Australian-American actor, director and entrepreneur. He was born in California and grew up in Mullumbimby, New South Wales. Over the past decade he has worked across film, television and theatre in Australia and internationally, and co-founded the filmmaking technology company The One LUT.

== Early life ==
Henri was born in California and raised in Mullumbimby, a small town in the Northern Rivers region of New South Wales, Australia.

== Acting career ==
=== Television ===
Henri has appeared in a number of Australian and international television productions. These include the Netflix series Glitch, Wentworth on Foxtel (also broadcast on Showtime in the United Kingdom), Rush on Network Ten, Magazine Wars on ABC, and Fatal Honeymoon on the American Lifetime network. He also voiced the character DJ Fresh McFresh Fresh in Kuu Kuu Harajuku, an animated series created by Gwen Stefani.

=== Film ===
Henri's film credits include Deepsea Challenge, a National Geographic documentary directed by James Cameron, The Very Excellent Mr. Dundee (directed by Dean Murphy for Sony International), Fatal Honeymoon (directed by Nadia Tass), The Subjects (directed by Robert Mond) and Inheritance (directed by Tyler Savage). He is set to star as Billy Hatch in the upcoming action-horror feature Prey, directed by Frank Magree, who had previously directed Henri in Run South. According to Magree, Henri was involved in a motorbike accident with a Russian man shortly before Run South began filming, which led to a fist fight that left him with a facial wound; the production opted to keep the visible scar throughout the finished film. Magree also said Henri tore a pectoral muscle during filming, and that in the final river sequence he emerged from the water with a nail lodged deep in his foot, projectile vomiting from the pain and requiring hospital treatment.

== Short films ==
=== Sengatan ===
Henri co-directed Sengatan (2017) with Frank Magree. The film is based on the true story of an Australian man who became caught up in a drug ring while travelling in Indonesia. The Brooklyn Film Festival described Henri as "an American born, Australian raised actor and filmmaker" in their official programme notes for the film's East Coast premiere. The film won Best Film at the Gold Coast Film Festival, Best Short Film at the Capricorn Film Festival, Best Foreign Film at the Myrtle Beach Film Festival and Best Editing at Flickerfest. It was also shortlisted for the Sydney Film Festival Lexus Fellowship.

=== No Hard Feelings ===
Henri co-directed and starred in No Hard Feelings (2020) with James Ballard. The film was shot on an iPhone in Canggu, Indonesia, on a budget of US$4,000. Scenestr described the film as exploring "male fragility and mateship" and reported that Henri and Ballard made it using "some accessories, an app called Filmic Pro and an iPhone XS". The film premiered at the Santa Barbara International Film Festival in January 2020, where Henri and Ballard received the Outstanding Performers of the Year Award. It went on to screen at the Calgary International Film Festival, Aspen Shortsfest and the Athens International Film Festival, all of which are Academy Award-qualifying festivals.

=== Run South ===
Henri co-produced and acted in Run South (2021), directed by Frank Magree and David Cleeve. The Sydney Morning Herald reported the film was shot in Indonesia over three weeks on a budget of A$40,000, and that Henri served as co-producer and actor on the production. The film premiered at the LA Shorts International Festival and made its Australian debut at Flickerfest 2022. The film was selected as part of the Best of Australian Shorts programme at Flickerfest.

== The One LUT ==
In 2023, Henri and James Ballard co-founded The One LUT, a company producing colour grading tools for iPhone filmmakers. RedShark News described the company as being "set up by Australian filmmakers Paul Henri and James Ballard" and noted that former FiLMiC Pro team member Eliot Fitzroy joined as a third co-founder. Their flagship product, The One LUT for Apple Log, is designed to match the colour profile of the iPhone 15 Pro to that of the ARRI Alexa cinema camera. The product was covered by Newsshooter, PetaPixel, CineD, Pro Video Coalition and Videomaker upon its release in January 2024.

== Awards ==
Year	Award	Category	Work
2016	Capricorn Film Festival	Best Short Film	Sengatan
2017	Gold Coast Film Festival	Best Film	Sengatan
2017	Myrtle Beach Film Festival	Best Foreign Film	Sengatan
2017	Flickerfest	Best Editing	Sengatan
2020	Santa Barbara International Film Festival	Outstanding Performers of the Year	No Hard Feelings

== Filmography ==
Year	Title	Role	Notes
2014	Deepsea Challenge		National Geographic; directed by James Cameron
2015	Fatal Honeymoon		Lifetime; directed by Nadia Tass
2015	The Subjects		Directed by Robert Mond
2016	Inheritance		Directed by Tyler Savage
2017	Sengatan	Co-director	Brooklyn Film Festival East Coast Premiere; short film
2017	Wentworth		Foxtel / Showtime UK
2018	Glitch		Netflix
2018	Kuu Kuu Harajuku	DJ Fresh McFresh Fresh (voice)	Animated series created by Gwen Stefani
2019	The Very Excellent Mr. Dundee		Sony International; directed by Dean Murphy
2020	No Hard Feelings	Rodney / Co-director	Santa Barbara IFF 2020; short film
2021	Run South	Co-producer / Actor	Flickerfest 2022; short film
2026	Prey	Billy Hatch	Directed by Frank Magree
TBA	Six of One	Chris	Short film; completed
TBA	Guts	Frank	TV Movie; post-production
