= That's Not My Dog! =

- Film poster
- Directed by: Dean Murphy
- Written by: Shane Jacobson; Robert Mond; Dean Murphy
- Produced by: Shane Jacobson; Robert Mond; Dean Murphy
- Starring: Shane Jacobson; Paul Hogan
- Cinematography: Roger Lanser
- Edited by: Robert Mond
- Production companies: Ocean View Entertainment; Sounds Write Productions
- Distributed by: Transmission Films
- Release date: 15 March 2018
- Running time: 88 minutes
- Country: Australia
- Language: English

That's Not My Dog! is a 2018 Australian comedy film written and directed by Dean Murphy and starring Shane Jacobson. Each of the cast members in the film are portraying themselves. The film had a limited cinematic release from 15–18 March 2018, which was extended due to popular demand from audiences.

On 31 March 2018, the film was added to the library of streaming service Stan, despite still screening in some cinemas. The film was released on DVD on 9 May 2018, and includes a behind the scenes feature.

== Plot synopsis ==
The film centres on Shane Jacobson who is throwing a party for his father. Invited are the funniest people Shane knows—Australia's biggest stars along with several Australian music legends playing their biggest hits live, right throughout the party. Featuring little to no developing plot or storyline, the film is instead set on the premise that each invited guest needs to bring nothing except their favourite joke, which each proceeds to tell throughout the night.

== Cast ==
Note: All cast members play themselves.

- Michala Banas
- Christie Whelan Browne
- Paul Fenech
- Tim Ferguson
- John Foreman
- Paul Hogan
- Shane Jacobson
- Jimeoin
- Ed Kavalee
- Anthony Lehmann
- Fiona O'Loughlin
- Steve Vizard
- Marty Fields

== See also ==
- Cinema of Australia
