= Billy Miller (actor) =

American actor (1979–2023)

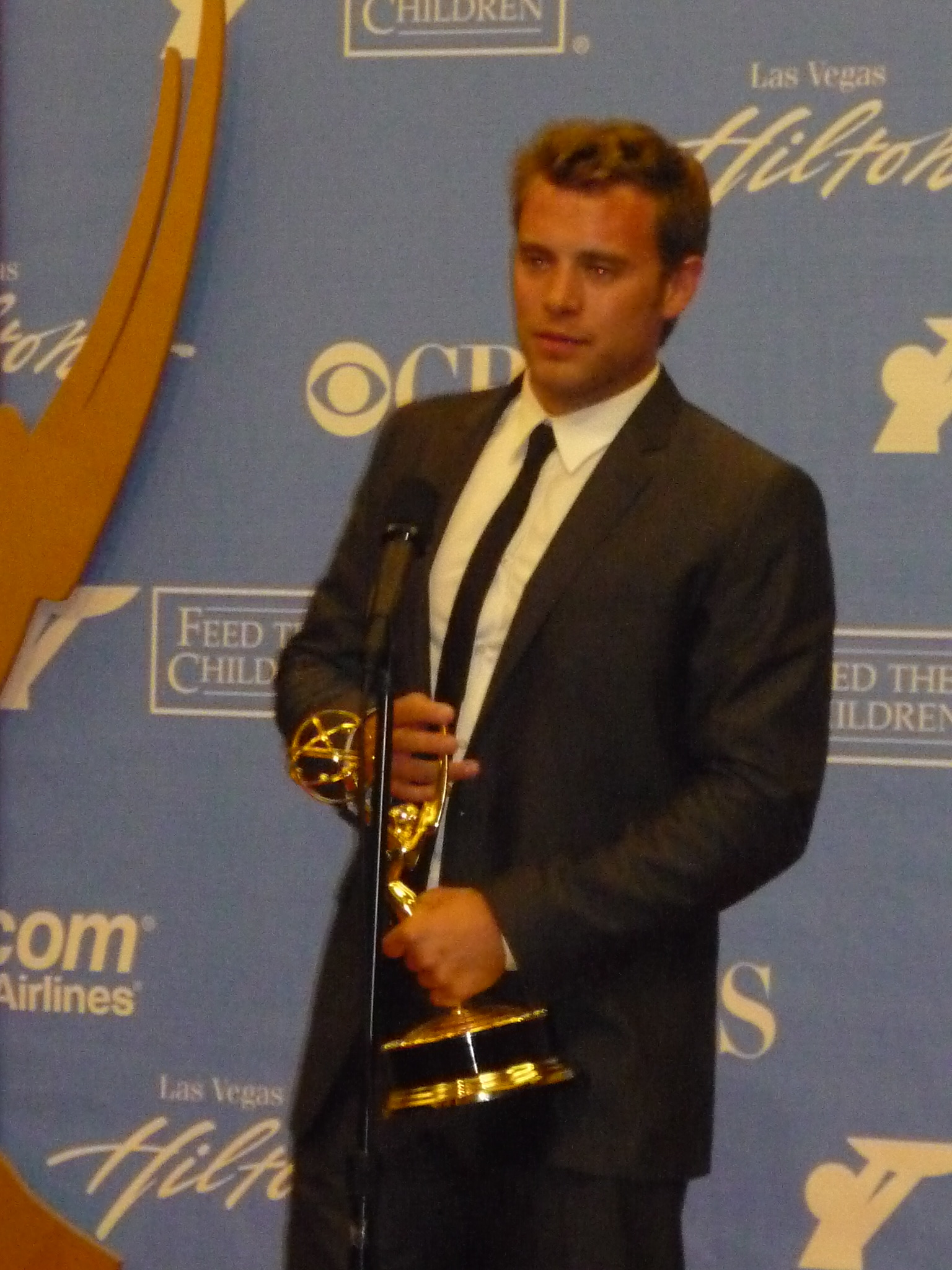
- Miller in 2010
- Born: William John Miller II; September 17, 1979; Tulsa, Oklahoma, U.S.
- Died: September 15, 2023 (aged 43); Austin, Texas, U.S.
- Other names: Billy J. Miller; B.J. Miller
- Education: University of Texas (B.A.)
- Occupation: Actor
- Years active: 2006–2022
- Awards: See below

William John Miller II (September 17, 1979 – September 15, 2023) was an American actor. He was recognized for his work on American soap operas, including his award-winning work as Billy Abbott on The Young and the Restless and his dual portrayals of Jason Morgan and Drew Cain on General Hospital.

== Early life and education ==
William John Miller II was born in Tulsa, Oklahoma, and grew up in Grand Prairie, Texas. As a child, Miller spent five years as a patient of Texas Scottish Rite Hospital for Children, an organization he also supported.

Miller attended Lamar High School in Arlington, Texas, and the University of Texas in Austin, Texas, where he received a communications degree and was one of only twenty students in the film department's intensive Production Sequence.

== Career ==
After graduating from college, Miller moved out to Los Angeles where he began working in the mail room of Industry Entertainment. His first break into acting came after he signed on with the Wilhelmina modeling agency. He appeared in six commercials, including two for Electronic Arts' The Sims. He also did commercials for JCPenney, Pizza Hut and pokerparty.com.

At the age of 24, Miller screen-tested for As the World Turns, a soap opera on the CBS network; he lost the audition, citing bad management, and subsequently parted ways with his agency and management company. He took a two-year hiatus from acting after that experience.

In 2006, Miller returned to acting, starring in an episode of CSI: NY. A year later, he landed the role of Richie Novak, the murdering and blackmailing brother of Annie Lavery on All My Children, a soap opera on ABC. His first appearance was August 30, 2007. When news of the character's demise broke in August 2008, Miller began the audition process again. Barbara Bloom (Senior Vice President, Daytime, CBS Entertainment), Julie Hanan Carruthers (Executive Producer, All My Children), Marla Kanelos (former script writer, All My Children, now Associate Head Writer, The Young and the Restless) and, screen-test partners Peter Bergman and Elizabeth Hendrickson, were instrumental in his casting at The Young and the Restless, where he was cast in the role of Billy Abbott. Miller, who submitted the longest Emmy reel among all nominated performers (over 32 minutes long—an entire episode), was awarded for his work in an It's A Wonderful Life-styled episode of The Young and the Restless with his first nomination and win as Outstanding Supporting Actor in a Drama Series on June 27, 2010, as well as June 14, 2013.

In 2011, he was nominated a second time in the Outstanding Supporting Actor category for the same role. Miller also appears, as himself, in an independent film titled Remembering Nigel, which premiered at the Paso Robles Digital Film Festival on November 25, 2009.

In August 2012, it was announced Miller would be appearing in primetime as a recurring cast member on The CW's Ringer. Miller was also cast as Gabe Watson in the Lifetime made-for-TV movie Fatal Honeymoon. In November 2013, it was announced Miller would depart the role of Billy; Miller's predecessor David Tom was named as his successor in the role. Miller called his decision to leave the role the "hardest thing" he had ever done.

On September 2, 2014, General Hospital executive producer Frank Valentini announced on Twitter that Miller would join the cast as Jason Morgan. In March 2018, for his portrayal of Jason, Miller earned a nomination for Outstanding Lead Actor. In 2017, with the return of Steve Burton to the role of Jason, Miller's casting was retconned to that of his twin, Drew Cain. In July 2019, Miller announced his exit from the soap.

== Death ==
Miller died in Austin, Texas, on September 15, 2023. In a statement, Miller's mother, Patricia, revealed his death was due to suicide following his battles with bipolar depression:

"He fought a long hard valiant battle with bipolar depression for years. He did everything he could to control the disease. He loved his family, his friends and his fans but in the end the disease won the fight and he surrendered his life."

== Filmography ==
Television roles
Year	Title	Role	Notes
2006	CSI: NY	Will Graham	Episode: "Live or Let Die"
2007–2008	All My Children	Richie Novak	Series regular
2008–2014	The Young and the Restless	Billy Abbott	Series regular
2011	Justified	James Earl Dean	Episode: "The Moonshine War"
2011–2012	Ringer	John Delario	Recurring role
2012	Fatal Honeymoon	Gabe Watson	Television film (Lifetime)
2013	Castle	Mickey Gerhardt	Episode: "Number One Fan"
2014	CSI: Crime Scene Investigation	Officer Robert Dolan	Episode: "The Fallen"
2014–2019	General Hospital	Jason Morgan	Series regular
2014–2019	General Hospital	Drew Cain	Series regular
2014	Major Crimes	Anthony Hunt	Episode: "Down the Drain"
2015–2019	Suits	Marcus Specter	Four episodes
2017	Ray Donovan	Todd Doherty	Three episodes
2019–2020	Truth Be Told	Alex Dunn	Recurring role
2022	NCIS	Ezra Moretti	Episode: "Unearth" Final performance

Film roles
Year	Title	Role	Notes
2009	Remembering Nigel	Himself	
2011	Ripper	Edward	3D short film
2014	Bad Blood	Garret Church	
2014	American Sniper	Naval Recruiter	

== Awards and nominations ==
List of acting awards and nominations
Year	Award	Category	Title	Result	Ref.
2010	Daytime Emmy Award	Outstanding Supporting Actor in a Drama Series	The Young and the Restless	Won	
2011	Daytime Emmy Award	Outstanding Supporting Actor in a Drama Series	The Young and the Restless	Nominated	
2013	Daytime Emmy Award	Outstanding Supporting Actor in a Drama Series	The Young and the Restless	Won	
2014	Daytime Emmy Award	Outstanding Lead Actor in a Drama Series	The Young and the Restless	Won	
2015	Daytime Emmy Award	Outstanding Lead Actor in a Drama Series	The Young and the Restless	Nominated	
2018	Daytime Emmy Award	Outstanding Lead Actor in a Drama Series	General Hospital	Nominated	

Preceded by Scott Seymour	Billy Abbott (role); 2008–14	Succeeded by David Tom
Preceded by Steve Burton	Jason Morgan (role); 2014–17	Succeeded by Steve Burton
First	Drew Cain (role); 2014–19	Succeeded by Cameron Mathison
