= Strange Bedfellows (2004 film) =

2004 film by Dean Murphy

- Theatrical released poster
- Directed by: Dean Murphy
- Written by: Stewart Faichney; Dean Murphy
- Produced by: Thomas Augsberger
- Starring: Paul Hogan; Michael Caton
- Cinematography: Roger Lanser; Sean McClory
- Edited by: Peter Carrodus
- Music by: Dale Cornelius
- Distributed by: Becker
- Release date: 22 April 2004
- Running time: 100 minutes
- Country: Australia
- Language: English
- Box office: $3 million

Strange Bedfellows is a 2004 Australian buddy comedy film directed by Dean Murphy and starring Paul Hogan and Michael Caton as heterosexual men who pass themselves off as a gay couple in order to get financial benefits from the government. A stage musical based on the film ran at the Princess Theatre in Melbourne.

== Plot ==
In the small Australian town of Yackandandah, Vince owns the local cinema and several other businesses, and is having trouble paying his taxes because his ex-wife got everything. The news of a new tax benefit for homosexual couples gives Vince an idea: he and best friend Ralph, a mechanic, can claim to be a couple and receive the benefits. Two complications develop: because of a careless mail delivery person, the postmaster sees their application for benefits and tells one person, and soon the whole town knows. Also, the national government is sending an investigator to make sure the men's relationship is legitimate.

Vince and Ralph take lessons in passing as gay from hairdresser Eric. They also visit Sydney and spend time at a gay club.

Russell, the investigator, shows up early, and so does Ralph's daughter Carla, who wants to introduce Peta, her girlfriend. It turns out that while Ralph is not gay, Carla is. Ralph and Vince redecorate Ralph's house and complete their interview, and they attend the local Fireman's Ball. Since Russell is there, Ralph and Vince have to continue their charade. Also, their friends from Sydney's gay club show up. Ralph makes a big speech about how his relationship with Vince is no one's business, and that their friends from out of town are normal people despite how they look. Carla is shocked by what her father has done, though Peta is pleased to learn about Ralph.

Russell tells the men he was not convinced in the interview, but he believes they are good people with a special relationship and should not be treated like criminals.

== Cast ==
- Paul Hogan as Vince Hopgood
- Michael Caton as Ralph Williams
- Pete Postlethwaite as Russell McKenzie
- Glynn Nicholas as Eric
- Roy Billing as Fred Coulson
- Alan Cassell as Stan Rogers
- Shane Withington as Father Xavier Delaney
- Paula Duncan as Yvonne Philpot
- Monica Maughan as Faith
- Kestie Morassi as Carla
- Stewart Faichney as Sergeant Jack Jenkins
- Lucy Rechnitzer as Peta
- Rob Carlton as Monique

== Alleged plagiarism ==
A very similar plot was later used in the American film I Now Pronounce You Chuck and Larry (2007), generating accusations that Chuck and Larry was a clone of Strange Bedfellows. In November 2007 the producers of Strange Bedfellows initiated legal action against Universal Pictures for copyright violation. The suit was withdrawn in April 2008 after the producers of Strange Bedfellows received an early draft of Chuck and Larry that predated their film, thus satisfying that they had not been plagiarised.

== Reception ==
=== Box office ===
Strange Bedfellows grossed $4,816,495 at the box office in Australia, which represented over 40% of the entire box office for Australian films for 2004. The film was awarded the Film Finance Corporation Australia IF Award for Box Office Achievement.

=== Critical response ===
The Sydney Morning Herald took a negative view of the film, concluding that "[Paul] Hogan's "ordinary bloke" humour was originally based on the fact that he once was one. He still plays the same character, but with less and less conviction."

On review aggregator Rotten Tomatoes the film has a score of 80% based on 5 reviews, with a 6.7/10 average rating.
