= Charlie & Boots =

- Directed by: Dean Murphy
- Written by: Stewart Faichney; Dean Murphy
- Produced by: Shana Levine; David Redman
- Starring: Paul Hogan; Shane Jacobson; Roy Billing; Morgan Griffin
- Distributed by: Paramount Pictures
- Release date: 1 September 2009
- Running time: 101 minutes
- Country: Australia
- Language: English
- Budget: A$8 million
- Box office: U.S.$3.4 million

Charlie & Boots is a 2009 Australian film starring Paul Hogan and Shane Jacobson. It had the best opening weekend for any Australian film in 2009 when it was released on Father's Day (1 September 2009). The film features many small towns in country Australia. It also has a cameo by Reg Evans, who died in the 2009 Victorian bushfires before the film was released, and the film is dedicated to the victims of the fires.

== Plot ==
Shane Jacobson plays Boots who takes his father (Paul Hogan) on a trip to fish on the northernmost tip of Australia because of something his father told him when he was a kid. Although he probably wasn't serious and can't remember it Boots decides to carry it out. They travel on a road trip from Victoria to the Cape York Peninsula in a Holden Kingswood, passing through towns like Tamworth. The film starts with the death of Gracie, Boots' mother and Charlie's wife. After Gracie's death, Boots goes to visit Charlie on the family farm, finding him locked away in the house in the dark, curtains drawn. Boots looks at a calendar on the wall with a picture of Cape York and remembers his father promising to take him fishing off the northernmost tip of Australia. As the trip starts out, Boots and Charlie seem tense, but as the days pass they begin to rekindle their father-son relationship.

Their journey involves visiting different towns, hang-outs in different restaurants, and visiting famous attractions. On their way, they start to reconcile and express their emotions about the recent death of Gracie, Charlie's wife and Boots's mother, and the drama unfolding around the death of Ben, Boots' son, by drowning.

They even help a young 16-year-old girl named Jess by allowing her to escape her boyfriend Tristan and aid her in her dream to go to the famous country city of Tamworth. The trio manage to arrive in the town, and Jess plays one of her songs in the famous large hall, after passing a manager. They push a car they thought was owned by a Tristan out of a car park at night and end up damaging it. They fly in a small aircraft with a pilot (Roy Billing). From the craft, they see the Great Barrier Reef. The pilot continuously hits the altitude meter, making Boots feel nervous. They are dropped off by the pilot and they both wave goodbye as it leaves. In the end, Charlie and Boots both make it to their destination, Cape York, the northernmost tip of Australia. They take their fishing rods and quote a few sentences they traveled with on their journey. As the credits roll, we learn that Jess has been discovered by a music industry manager and has made a single about an obnoxious boyfriend. At the end of the credits, we see a brief clip of Charlie and Boots traveling over the Sydney Harbour Bridge. They look up from their car in awe, causing Boots to marvel at how big the bridge is. Charlie quips "Yeah... imagine having to paint (it)" – a dig at Hogan's pre-fame occupation as a worker on it.

== Cast ==
- Paul Hogan as Charlie McFarland
- Alan Powell as Rodeo Clown
- Morgan Griffin as Jess
- Shane Jacobson as Boots McFarland
- Deborah Kennedy as Miles Waitress
- Reg Evans as Mac
- Roy Billing as Roly
- Alec Wilson as Rodeo Worker 1
- Val Lehman as Edna (Bowling Lady Driver) (billed as Valerie Lehman)
- Lisa N Edwards as Graeme's Wife
- Di Smith as Strawberry Lady (as Diane Smith)
- Anne Phelan as Female Truckie
- Bec Asha as Gunbar Waitress (billed as Rebecca Asha)
- Danny Baldwin as Bucking Horse Rider
- Beverley Dunn as Val
- Andy Pappas as Shearer 2
- Michael Morley as Young Cowboy Rodeo
- Sam Elia as Motorbike Cop
- Scott Harrison as Graeme
- Stewart Faichney as Truck Driver
- Anthony Hammer as Tristan
- Richard Payten as Toilet Guy
- Eloise Grace as Masseuse
- Charlotte Victoria as Granddaughter
- Deb Fryers as Massage Girl 1
- Patrick O'Meara as Rodeo Worker 2
- Fiona MacGregor as Toowoomba Waitress 1
- Patricia Wood as Bowling Lady
- Tanya Cinelli as Toowoomba Waitress 2
- Baxter James Thomson as Ben
- John Nutting as himself
- Anthony Sargeant as Country Band
- Robert McGluggage as Funeral Guest
- Joe Faulkner as Cowboy
- Ann Hurst as Bowling Lady
- John Leonard as Radio DJ
- Christopher Gaudion as Bull Rider
- Rob Mills as Rodeo Announcer
- Catherine Thomson as Therese
- Barbara MacMillan as Marge
- Korey Greehaigh as Troublemakers
- Adam Knowles as Rodeo Clown
- Bernie Hoefnagels as Motel Owner
- Steve Lack as Traveller
- Shelley Minson as Country Band
- Brodie Greenhalgh as Troublemakers
- Laline Engman as Massage Girl 2
- Cory Ford as Bull Rider
- Dallas Powell as Bucking Horse Rider
- Christopher Bruce as Grandson
- T.J. Alcaniz as Not Mexican Waiter
- Mary Fanello as Vendor Lady
- Matt Scullion as Country Band Singer
- Susan McGrath as Neighbour
- Peggy Thompson as Grace
- Brett Tomlin as Country Band
- Marisa Jones as Jogger
- Raheel Abid as Petrol Station Attendant
- Anne Herd as Line Dancer
- Shelley Moser as Leilani
- Dallas Olsen as Shearer 1
- Troy Furley as Holden Museum Guide
- Lesley Hurst as Bowling Lady
- Ross Stockham as Bull Rider
- Helen Hoefnagels as Breakfast Lady
- Heidi Williams as Woman with Tray
- Lawrie Minson as Country Band
- Brett Lobsey as Country Band
- Jean Hyde as Line Dancer

== Music ==
- Jack, single by songwriter Lianna Rose

== Production ==
Filming took place in Warrnambool, Horsham, Echuca, Hay, Tamworth, Tenterfield, Emerald and the Cape York Peninsula.

== Reception ==
The film received generally positive reviews with 58% positive rating on Rotten Tomatoes from 12 reviews as of July 2019. It was called a "likeable family comedy" by Sandra Hall of The Sydney Morning Herald and "a superbly relaxed and good-natured film" by Evan Williams of The Australian.
