= Transmission Films =

Film production and distribution company

- Type: Private
- Industry: Motion picture
- Founded: 2008
- Founder: Richard Payten; Andrew Mackie
- Headquarters: Sydney, Australia and Auckland, New Zealand
- Key people: Richard Payten; Andrew Mackie
- Products: Film distribution Film production
- Website: Official website

Transmission Films is an Australian-New Zealand film production and distribution company based in Sydney and Auckland, New Zealand founded in 2008 by Richard Payten and Andrew Mackie.

== History ==
Transmission Films was founded in 2008 by Richard Payten and Andrew Mackie, who were previously general managers at Dendy Films. It initially launched in partnership with Paramount Pictures, but in 2015 signed a multi-year home entertainment output deal with Sony Pictures.

As of 2009, Transmission was doing the physical distribution work for Australian film distribution company Footprint Films.

Transmission has released a number of films into the Australian and New Zealand market, including Rare Exports, The King's Speech, Amour, Samson & Delilah, The Railway Man, Calvary, Shame, Tracks, Mr. Turner, Holding the Man, Suffragette, Carol and Brooklyn. It has also released a number of successful New Zealand films into the NZ market including The World's Fastest Indian, Boy, The Dark Horse and The Dead Lands.

== Description ==
The company is based in Sydney. It is a sister company of See-Saw Films, an Oscar-winning producer of films as The King's Speech, Shame and Lion.

== Ranking ==
In May 2012, The Australian called Transmission Films principals Andrew Mackie and Richard Payten the 23rd most influential individuals in the Australian arts. In 2014 Transmission Films was ranked as the best-reviewed Australian distributor across all episodes of the TV series At The Movies.

== Film distributions ==
Year	Film	Director
2005	The World's Fastest Indian	Roger Donaldson
2009	Samson & Delilah	Warwick Thornton
2010	Boy	Taika Waititi
2010	Rare Exports: A Christmas Tale	Jalmari Helander
2011	Shame	Steve McQueen
2011	The King's Speech	Tom Hooper
2012	Amour	Michael Haneke
2012	In the House	François Ozon
2013	The Railway Man	Jonathan Teplitzky
2013	Tracks	John Curran
2014	Mr. Turner	Mike Leigh
2014	The Dark Horse	James Napier Robertson
2014	The Dead Lands	Toa Fraser
2014	Calvary	John Michael McDonagh
2015	Holding the Man	Timothy Conigrave
2015	Suffragette	Sarah Gavron
2015	Carol	Todd Haynes
2015	Strangerland	Kim Farrant
2015	Brooklyn	John Crowley
2019	Danger Close: The Battle of Long Tan	Kriv Stenders
2019	The Nightingale	Jennifer Kent
2019	Ride Like a Girl	Rachel Griffiths

== See also ==
- List of film production companies
- List of television production companies
