= Yves Rénier =

French actor (1942–2021)

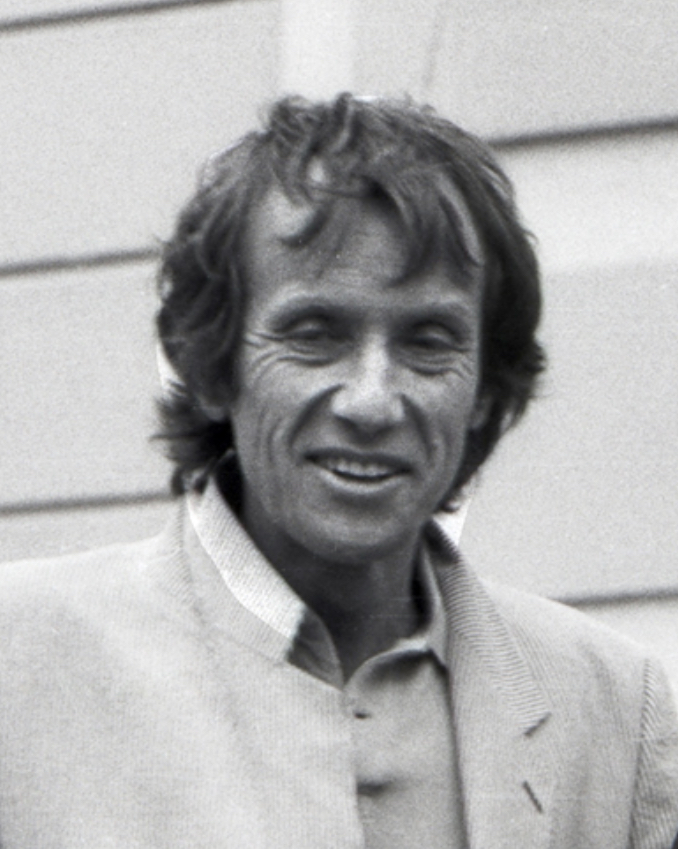
- Born: 29 September 1942; Bern, Switzerland
- Died: 24 April 2021 (aged 78); Neuilly-sur-Seine, France
- Occupations: Actor, director, screenwriter
- Years active: 1960–2021
- Children: 4

Yves Rénier (29 September 1942 – 24 April 2021) was a French actor, director, screenwriter, and voice actor, best known for starring in the long running television series Commissaire Moulin (1976-2006). The cause of his death, in France at age 78, was revealed by his wife to have been due to a heart attack. He reportedly suffered from a cardiac ailment, for which he'd undergone surgery three years prior to his death.

He was the son of dramatist Max Régnier.

== Filmography ==
=== Actor ===
Year	Title	Role	Director	Notes
1961	The Count of Monte Cristo	Albert de Mortcerf	Claude Autant-Lara	
1961	Les jours heureux	Bernard	Arnaud Desjardins	TV movie
1961	La vie que je t'ai donnée	Flavio	Guy Lessertisseur	TV movie
1963	Méfiez-vous, mesdames	Christian	André Hunebelle	
1963	Les vierges	The young drunk	Jean-Pierre Mocky	
1964	Les Cinq Dernières Minutes	Vicky Domont	Bernard Hecht	TV series (1 episode)
1965	Belphegor, or Phantom of the Louvre	André Bellegarde	Claude Barma	TV mini-series
1966	Illusions perdues	Lucien de Rubempré	Maurice Cazeneuve	TV mini-series
1966-69	Les Globe-trotters	Pierre Ribard	Jack Pinoteau & Claude Boissol	TV series (39 episodes)
1967	Le grand dadais	Germain	Pierre Granier-Deferre	
1968	The Most Beautiful Month	Bruno Besson	Guy Blanc	
1969	Un merveilleux parfum d'oseille	Yves de Kerfuntel	Rinaldo Bassi	
1971	Prière pour Éléna	François Sauvage	Abder Isker	TV movie
1972	Figaro-ci, Figaro-là	Gudin	Hervé Bromberger	TV movie
1973	George Who?	Alfred de Musset	Michèle Rosier	
1973	Un tyran sous la pluie	Patrick	Philippe Arnal	TV mini-series
1974	À trois temps	Walter	Jean Kerchbron	TV movie
1976	Le cheval évanoui	Hubert Darsay	Alain Dhénaut	TV movie
1976-2006	Commissaire Moulin	Commissioner Jean-Paul Moulin	Yves Rénier, Gilles Béhat, ...	TV series (69 episodes)
1977	Peppermint Soda	Philippe	Diane Kurys	
1978	Zigzags	Pierre Laisné	Bruno Gantillon	TV movie
1979	Pour tout l'or du Transvaal	Jacques Cervin	Claude Boissol	TV mini-series
1982	Les maupas	Antoine Chaumont	Jean-François Toussaint	TV series (1 episode)
1983	Quelques hommes de bonne volonté	Sammecaud	François Villiers	TV mini-series
1985	Adieu Blaireau	Professor	Bob Decout	
1985	Au théâtre ce soir	Gérard	Pierre Sabbagh	TV series (1 episode)
1986	Pékin Central	Yves Barnier	Camille de Casabianca	
1987	Marie Pervenche	Mondine	Claude Boissol	TV series (1 episode)
1988	Frantic	Inspector	Roman Polanski	
1991	Merci la vie	Robert	Bertrand Blier	
1994	Aventures dans le Grand Nord	Donald McRae	Gilles Carle	TV series (1 episode)
1995	Les Anges gardiens	Yvon Radmilo	Jean-Marie Poiré	
1996	Hold-up en l'air	Costa	Eric Civanyan	TV movie
1997	Enquête d'audience	Commissioner Jean-Paul Moulin	Laurent Pellicer	Short
1997	Le surdoué	Robert Blanc	Alain Bonnot	TV movie
1998	Un père inattendu	Francis Haudrant	Alain Bonnot	TV movie
1999	Je règle mon pas sur le pas de mon père	Richard	Rémi Waterhouse	
2000	Route de nuit	Marc	Laurent Dussaux	TV movie
2001	Mortel Transfert	Max Kubler	Jean-Jacques Beineix	
2001	Absolutely Fabulous	Alain Vaudoye	Gabriel Aghion	
2001	Philosophale		Farid Fedjer	
2002	The Race	Colonel	Djamel Bensalah	
2002	Sexes très opposés	The rich man	Éric Assous	
2002	Sentiments partagés	Stéphane	Daniel Janneau	TV movie
2005	Dolmen	Patrick Ryan	Didier Albert & Eric Summer	TV series (6 episodes)
2007	3 amis	Antoine	Michel Boujenah	
2007	Le monsieur d'en face	Maxime Martin	Alain Robillard	TV movie
2009	Otages	Antoine Pradeau	Didier Albert	TV movie
2011	Beur sur la ville	Captain Jancovic	Djamel Bensalah	
2011	Course contre la montre	Benjamin Tomasini	Roger Wielgus	TV movie
2011	Section de recherches	Veber	Olivier Barma	TV series (2 episodes)
2012	Médecin-chef à la Santé	/	Yves Rénier	TV movie
2014	Coût de chance	Michel Lacharrière	Denis Malleval	TV movie
2015	Flic, tout simplement	The director	Yves Rénier	TV movie
2017	Je voulais juste rentrer chez moi	Marc Essartier	Yves Rénier	TV movie
2018	Jacqueline Sauvage, c'était lui ou moi	Directeur Prison	Yves Rénier	TV movie
2019	Le temps est assassin	César Garcia	Claude-Michel Rome	TV series (8 episodes)
2020	I Love You Coiffure	The joker	Muriel Robin	TV movie
2021	La traque	Arnaud Costenoble	Yves Rénier	TV movie
2021	Léo Mattéï, Brigade des Mineurs	Pierre	Hervé Renoh	TV series (1 episode)

=== Director ===
Year	Title	Notes
1990-2006	Commissaire Moulin	TV series (16 episodes); Also writer
2012	Médecin-chef à la Santé	TV movie
2015	Flic, tout simplement	TV movie
2017	Je voulais juste rentrer chez moi	TV movie Also producer
2018	Jacqueline Sauvage, c'était lui ou moi	TV movie Nominated - Globe de Cristal Award for Best Television Film or Television Series
2021	La traque	TV movie

== Theater ==
Year	Title	Author	Director
1971	The Misanthrope	Molière	Antoine Bourseiller
1972	The Massacre at Paris	Christopher Marlowe	Patrice Chéreau
1973	Le Tournant	Françoise Dorin	Michel Roux
1998	Obsessions	Patrick Hamilton	Raymond Gérôme

== Dubbing ==
Year	Title	Role	Actor	Director	Notes
1974	The Great Gatsby	Tom Buchanan	Bruce Dern	Jack Clayton	
1982	Silkwood	Drew Stephens	Kurt Russell	Mike Nichols	
1983	The Best Little Whorehouse in Texas	Sheriff Ed Earl Dodd	Burt Reynolds	Colin Higgins	
1983	Two of a Kind	Zack Melon	John Travolta	John Herzfeld	
1983	Hardcastle and McCormick	J.J. Beal	Robert Desiderio	Guy Magar	TV series (1 episode)
1984	The World of Don Camillo	Don Camillo	Terence Hill	Terence Hill	
1984	Once Upon a Time in America	Sharkey	Robert Harper	Sergio Leone	
1984-91	Hunter	Det. Sgt. Rick Hunter	Fred Dryer	James Whitmore Jr., Michael Preece, ...	TV series (152 episodes)
1985	Code of Silence	Eddie Cusack	Chuck Norris	Andrew Davis	
1986	Remo Williams: The Adventure Begins	Remo Williams	Fred Ward	Guy Hamilton	
1986	Crocodile Dundee	Michael "Crocodile" Dundee	Paul Hogan	Peter Faiman	
1987	La Mission	Cooper	Robert Ginty	David Winters	
1987	Last Man Standing	Napoleon	Michael Copeman	Damian Lee	
1988	Stormy Monday	Cosmo	Tommy Lee Jones	Mike Figgis	
1988	Bloodsport	Ray Jackson	Donald Gibb	Newt Arnold	
1988	Crocodile Dundee II	Michael "Crocodile" Dundee	Paul Hogan	John Cornell	
1988	Mickey's 60th Birthday	Det. Sgt. Rick Hunter	Fred Dryer	Scott Garen	TV movie
1990	Almost an Angel	Terry Dean	Paul Hogan	John Cornell	
1994	Lightning Jack	Lightning Jack Kane	Paul Hogan	Simon Wincer	
1995	The Return of Hunter	Det. Sgt. Rick Hunter	Fred Dryer	Bradford May	TV movie
1996	Flipper	Porter Ricks	Paul Hogan	Alan Shapiro	
1998	Vampires	Jack Crow	James Woods	John Carpenter	
1998	Floating Away	Shane	Paul Hogan	John Badham	TV movie
2000	Rules of Engagement	Col. Hayes "Hodge" Hodges	Tommy Lee Jones	William Friedkin	
2000	Relic Hunter	Randall Fox	Fred Dryer	Terry Ingram	TV series (1 episode)
2001	Crocodile Dundee in Los Angeles	Michael "Crocodile" Dundee	Paul Hogan	Simon Wincer	
2002	Hunter: Return to Justice	Det. Sgt. Rick Hunter	Fred Dryer	Bradford May	TV movie
2003	Hunter: Back in Force	Det. Sgt. Rick Hunter	Fred Dryer	Jefferson Kibbee	TV movie
2003	Hunter	Det. Sgt. Rick Hunter	Fred Dryer	John T. Kretchmer, Winrich Kolbe, ...	TV series (5 episodes)
2008	No Country for Old Men	Ed Tom Bell	Tommy Lee Jones	Coen brothers	
2011	The Company Men	Gene McClary	Tommy Lee Jones	John Wells	
2011	Captain America: The First Avenger	Colonel Chester Phillips	Tommy Lee Jones	Joe Johnston	
2013	The Wrong Woman	Detective Sanford	Fred Dryer	Richard Gabai	TV movie

== Author ==
Year	Book	Publisher
1986	Le Parano	Balland
2008	Et si je m'étais trompé de vie…	Succès du livre éditions
