= Betty Bobbitt =

Australian actress (1939–2020)

- Bobbitt in TV series Prisoner as Judy Byrant
- Born: Betty Ann Bobbitt; 7 February 1939; New York City, U.S.
- Died: 30 November 2020 (aged 81); Melbourne, Victoria, Australia
- Occupations: Actress; director; singer; playwright
- Years active: 1957–2004, 2010–2020
- Known for: Prisoner (aka Prisoner: Cell Block H) (TV series) as Judy Bryant; cameos in Crocodile Dundee II; Crocodile Dundee III and The Very Excellent Mr. Dundee
- Spouse: Robin Hill (m. 1963; div. 1990)
- Partner: Mig Dann
- Children: Oliver Bobbitt; Christopher Hill

Betty Ann Bobbitt (7 February 1939 – 30 November 2020) was an American-born Australian actress, director, singer, and playwright, with a career that spanned over 60 years, encompassing theatre, television, and film.

Bobbitt was best known for her small screen role in TV series Prisoner (known as Prisoner: Cell Block H in the UK and North America, and Caged Woman in Canada) as lesbian mother figure Judy Bryant from 1980 to 1985, through 430 episodes.

== Early life ==
Bobbitt was born on 7 February 1939 in Manhattan, New York, to nurse Elizabeth Bobbitt (née Sprout) and Hubert Bobbitt, a steel mill worker and grew up in Norristown, a suburb of Philadelphia. She attended a Catholic school and Norristown High School.

== Career ==
=== Early career ===
When Bobbitt moved to Los Angeles, at the age of 18, to appear in a theatre production of Auntie Mame, she was approached by an Australian television producer who asked her if she "wanted to come to Australia and be funny". She was contracted for six months and appeared as a regular on a Melbourne television variety show, Daly at Night, as "a female Victor Borge, singing off-key and just plain acting like a dumb brunette". She was known in Australia in the early 1960s as "Betty Bobbitt the dizzy brunette from Big Bear", referencing a fictitious place ostensibly in Pennsylvania.

=== Theatre ===
Bobbitt appeared in many theatre productions with the Melbourne Theatre Company. She also teamed up with future Prisoner stars Anne Phelan and Colette Mann in a 1970s stage show called The Glitter Girls who performed 1940s songs. Notable theatre included Martin Cripps' Cruel and Tender and Jean Cocteau of The Human Voice

=== Television ===
Bobbitt was a fixture on Australian television from the mid-1960s with guest roles in serials including Matlock Police, Homicide, Cop Shop, A Country Practice, The Flying Doctors, All Saints, Marshall Law, and Blue Heelers.

She became best known for her role in Prisoner for her portrayal of lesbian character Judy Bryant, a series regular. She first appeared in the show in February 1980. After it started to gain a cult status in the US, billed as Prisoner: Cell Block H, an American actress was suggested by producers as a nod to local audiences. Her character was intended only for a short-term 13-episode appearance, but she became immensely popular, and was retained in the series. Bobbitt continued in the role until May 1985, making her the show's second-longest serving actor in the main cast, at 429 episodes, second only to Elspeth Ballantyne as officer Meg Jackson/Morris, an original who appeared at the series' inception.

In the series, the character of Judy was convicted of smuggling drugs so she could be with her lesbian lover Sharon Gilmore in the fictional Wentworth Detention Centre, whilst inside and out of prison she was raped, survived a murder attempt, broke out on two occasions and discovered she had a long lost daughter. Bobbitt was the second major star actress to portray a lesbian character in the series after Carol Burns, who played original character Franky Doyle.

During her time in Prisoner, Bobbitt performed with fellow cast members Jane Clifton and Colette Mann in a three-woman troupe named "The Mini Busettes" in the 1980s. They performed around Australia in RSL and similar clubs.

After Prisoner, Bobbitt continued in theatre roles and made guest appearances in television and film. In 2004, Bobbitt she made a brief uncredited appearance in the American television remake of the Stephen King classic, Salem's Lot.

In 2019, Bobbitt appeared in a guest role in TV series Neighbours, to celebrate the 40th Anniversary of Prisoner. She featured alongside fellow stars Jane Clifton, Jentah Sobott and Jenny Lovell, who arrive in Erinsborough to attend Sheila's Bookclub. Her appearance reunited her with other former Prisoner co-stars who had gone on to star in the series – Colette Mann, who played regular Sheila Canning and Jackie Woodburne, who has long played Susan Kennedy.

=== Film ===
On film, she had cameo roles appearing opposite Paul Hogan, in several of the Crocodile Dundee series including Crocodile Dundee II (1988), Crocodile Dundee in Los Angeles (a.k.a. Crocodile Dundee III) (2001) and the direct-to-video The Very Excellent Mr. Dundee (2020). She also appeared in the 2010 thriller, Torn.

=== Publication ===
In 2011, Bobbitt self-published her book "From the Outside" (ISBN 9780646561332), which documents her life and career playing the role of Judy Bryant on Prisoner.

== Personal life and death ==
Bobbitt was married to Australian artist, Robin Hill in 1963, with whom she had a son, Christopher Hill, who was born in the UK. In 1966 the couple were divorced. She also had a second son, Ollie Bobbitt Hill. Her partner was artist Mig Dann.

Bobbitt died in Melbourne on 30 November 2020, aged 81, five days after suffering a stroke.

== Filmography ==
=== Film ===
Year	Title	Role	Notes
1982	The Clinic	Wilma	Feature film
1988	Crocodile Dundee II	Tourist (Meg)	Feature film
1992	Survive the Savage Sea	Mrs. Haines	Television film
1997	Doing Time for Patsy Cline	Connie	Feature film
2001	Crocodile Dundee III	American Lady	Feature film
2003	The Cadet	The Addict	Short film
2010	Torn	Daniel's Mother	
2020	The Very Excellent Mr. Dundee	Betty	Feature film mockumentary

=== Television ===
Year	Title	Role	Notes
1966, 1975–1976	Homicide	Vicki Franklin, Blossom, Customs Officer	3 episodes
1974	Stopover	Cashier	TV movie
1975	Matlock Police	Mrs. Nelson, Valerie Praitt	2 episodes
1978, 1979	Cop Shop	Helen Walsh, Peggy Morgan	4 episodes
1980–1985	Prisoner	Judy Bryant	Seasons 2–7, 429 episodes (main role)
1981	Prisoner in Concert	Judy Bryant	TV special
1984	Special Squad	Daisy	Episode: "Until Death"
1986	A Country Practice	Ellen Dainty	2 episodes
1991	The Flying Doctors	Jo Magee	Episode: "Johnno Be Good"
1992	Frankie's House	Surgeon	Miniseries
1998–1999	All Saints	Olivia McCreadie	2 episodes
1989	Edens Lost	Mabel	TV miniseries, 1 episode
2000	The Games	Betty, Media Liaison	Episode: "The End"
2002	Marshall Law	Wanda	Episode: "The Samovar"
2000	Blue Heelers	Madge Harcourt	2 episodes
2004	Salem's Lot	Uncredited	Miniseries
2019	Neighbours	Erica King	Season 35, episode 8048

== Stage ==
=== As actor ===
Year	Title	Role	Notes
1962	Outrageous Fortune	Guest artist	Arrow Theatre, Melbourne
1974	Hansel and Gretel	Wilhelmina the Wicked Witch	Doncaster Shopping Centre, Melbourne
1975	The Shoemaker and the Elves		Monash University, Melbourne
1977	Desire Under the Elms	Abbie Putnam	Melbourne Athenaeum with MTC
1977	Ring Round the Moon	Isabelle's Mother	Melbourne Athenaeum with MTC
1978	The Human Voice	Solo performer	Russell Street Theatre, Melbourne with MTC
1978	The Beaux' Stratagem	Countrywoman	Melbourne Athenaeum with MTC
1978	Electra	Chorus	Melbourne Athenaeum with MTC
1978	The Resistible Rise of Arturo Ui	Dockdaisy	Melbourne Athenaeum with MTC
1979	Gentlemen Only	Algy	Playbox Theatre, Melbourne with Hoopla Theatre Foundation
1979	Errol Flynn's Great Big Adventure Book for Boys		Russell Street Theatre, Melbourne with MTC
1979; 1980	Cinderella	Queen Mother	Melbourne Athenaeum, Victorian regional tour, Northland Shopping Centre Theatre, Melbourne with MTC
1980	Jack and the Beanstalk		Victorian regional tour
1980	Goldilocks		Victorian regional tour
1980	Red Riding Hood		Victorian regional tour
1980	Alice in Wonderland	Queen of Hearts	Victorian regional tour
1980	The Old Woman Who Lived in a Shoe		Victorian regional tour
1980; 1981	Catch a Rising Star		Melbourne Theatre Restaurant
1984	Pack of Lies	Helen	Russell Street Theatre, Melbourne with MTC
1987–1988; 1990	Nunsense	Reverend Mother	Australian tour with Victorian Arts Council
1992	Humorists Read the Humorists		Melbourne Athenaeum for MICF
1992	Peroxide		Police Auditorium, Melbourne with High Fidelity Theatre for MICF
1994	Steaming	Mrs Meadow	Riverside Theatres Parramatta, Darwin Performing Arts Centre, Regal Theatre, Perth, Monash University, Melbourne with Gary Penny Productions
1999	Born Yesterday	Mrs Hodges	Playhouse, Melbourne with MTC
2005	Cruel and Tender	Housekeeper	Fairfax Studio, Melbourne with MTC
2008	Gala		Southbank Theatre, Melbourne with MTC
2009	Rockabye	Esme	Sumner Theatre, Melbourne with MTC
2019	A Normal Child		Northcote Town Hall, Melbourne

=== As director ===
Year	Title	Role	Notes
1987–1988; 1990	Nunsense	Director	Australian tour with Victorian Arts Council
1991	Dream Kitchen	Director	La Mama, Melbourne
