= Ken Shadie =

Australian screenwriter (1935–2020)

Ken Shadie OAM
- Ken Shadie c.1986, screenwriter, producer, journalist and playwright
- Born: Kenneth George Shadie; 8 December 1935; Bondi, New South Wales, Australia
- Died: 29 June 2020 (aged 84); Sydney, New South Wales, Australia
- Education: North Sydney Technical High School
- Occupations: Screenwriter; producer; journalist; playwright
- Spouse: Pam Jameson (m. 1957)
- Writing career
- Notable work: Crocodile Dundee

Kenneth George Shadie OAM (8 December 1935 – 29 June 2020) was an Australian screenwriter, producer and playwright, who co-wrote the Academy Award-nominated screenplay for the film Crocodile Dundee with Paul Hogan and John Cornell.

== Biography ==
Shadie was born in the Sydney suburb of Bondi and raised in Lane Cove. He was the son of Albert Nicholas Shadie, who was of Lebanese Christian descent, and Edith (née Rayner) from Manchester, England.

He started in the sound department of ATN7's studio, working on Pardon Miss Westcott (1959), which was Australia's first original TV musical film. From 1964 to 1968, he was chief writer and script editor of The Mavis Bramston Show. He worked on its less successful follow up News Revue, as the co-producer with Michael Pate.

Shadie served as a producer and writer for the 1972 rustic comedy Snake Gully with Dad and Dave, which reunited him with a number of Bramston colleagues. In 1974, he contributed scripts for the groundbreaking soap opera Number 96.

In the late 1970s he was writing a revue for comedy actor Ron Frazer. This was seen by Paul Hogan who loved the writing and asked to meet Shadie. The two of them started writing together on The Paul Hogan Show.

Hogan, Shadie and Cornell co-wrote the script for the film Crocodile Dundee, which went on to become a massive hit in Australia and abroad, with the screenplay nominated for the Academy Award for Best Original Screenplay in 1986.

In the late 1980s Ken Shadie wrote the first draft of the movie version of The Phantom.

Shadie was awarded the Medal of the Order of Australia (OAM) in the Queen's Birthday Honours in 2015, for service to the film and television industries as a writer, and to veterans (for his community work as president of the Brooklyn sub-branch of the Returned and Services League of Australia).

Shadie died at the age of 84, on 29 June 2020.

== Select Credits ==
- The Mavis Bramston Show
- The Undertakers (1970)
- Crocodile Dundee (1986)
