= Crocodile Dundee (film series) =

Film series (1986–2001)

- Official film series logo
- Based on: Characters by Paul Hogan
- Starring: Paul Hogan; Linda Kozlowski (See list below)
- Production companies: Rimfire Films; Paramount Pictures
- Distributed by: Paramount Pictures (Skydance)
- Countries: Australia; United States
- Language: English
- Budget: $47,800,000
- Box office: $607,202,827

The Crocodile Dundee trilogy consists of three action-comedy films centered on a crocodile hunter named Michael J. "Crocodile" Dundee. The trilogy stars Paul Hogan in the title role, over the course of three feature films. Hogan refused several proposals for more Crocodile Dundee films.

== Films ==
Film	U.S. release date	Director(s)	Screenwriter(s)	Story by	Producer(s)
Crocodile Dundee	September 26, 1986	Peter Faiman	Ken Shadie, Paul Hogan & John Cornell	Paul Hogan	John Cornell
Crocodile Dundee II	May 25, 1988	John Cornell	Paul Hogan & Brett Hogan	Paul Hogan & Brett Hogan	Jane Scott & John Cornell
Crocodile Dundee in Los Angeles	April 18, 2001	Simon Wincer	Eric Abrams & Matthew Berry	Eric Abrams & Matthew Berry	Paul Hogan & Lance Hool

=== Crocodile Dundee (1986) ===
New York reporter Sue Charlton travels to Australia to interview Mick “Crocodile” Dundee, a man known for his adventures in the rugged Australian wilderness. Intrigued by his personality and way of life, she invites him to New York City. There, Dundee encounters the sights, customs, and people of a busy urban environment, offering him a fresh perspective on life beyond the Australian outback.

=== Crocodile Dundee II (1988) ===
Mick "Crocodile" Dundee is just settling into his new way of life, in a home in Manhattan, when a South American drug dealer abducts his girlfriend, Sue. The drug dealer believes that images of his criminal activities, taken by her photographer ex-husband, are now being held by her. The crime boss holds her hostage in New York under threatening pretences, hoping that she'll give up the evidence. The legendary intrepid Dundee is soon on the criminal's trail and, as an expert hunter and adventurer, he aims to rescue his hostage girlfriend.

=== Crocodile Dundee in Los Angeles (2001) ===
Dundee, an expert adventurer in the truest sense: a crocodile hunter from the wilds of the Australian Outback, and survivor of the dangers of New York City, now finds he must move to the luxury of Tinseltown - Los Angeles, California - when his wife, Sue, receives a new job as a newspaper bureau chief. "Mick" becomes an amateur undercover investigator when a conspiracy arises surrounding a Hollywood studio and their next big film release.

=== Future ===
Following the overwhelmingly positive response to the fake trailers from the 2018 Super Bowl commercial campaign, Chris Hemsworth confirmed in February 2018 the possibility of creating a film. In discussing the production on the short, he stated:

"While shooting, Danny McBride and I spoke about if it could be a movie. We started to get worried that if this commercial is as good as we hoped it's going to be, people are going to be disappointed, we're going to have to make a movie. But I had so much fun making this commercial, I'd definitely be open to discussions about it."

== Cast and characters ==
List indicator

This section includes characters who will appear or have appeared in the franchise in main roles.

- An empty grey cell indicates the character was not in the film, or that the character's official presence has not yet been confirmed.

Character	Films			Marketing
Character	Crocodile Dundee	Crocodile Dundee II	Crocodile Dundee in Los Angeles	Dundee: The Son of a Legend Returns Home
Michael J. "Crocodile" Dundee	Paul Hogan	Paul Hogan	Paul Hogan	Paul Hogan
Sue Charlton Dundee	Linda Kozlowski	Linda Kozlowski	Linda Kozlowski	
Walter "Wally" Riley Sr.	John Meillon	John Meillon		
Luis Rico		Hechter Ubarry		
Miguel		Juan Fernández de Alarcon		
Arnan Rothman			Jere Burns	
Miloš Drubnik			Jonathan Banks	
Michael "Mikey" Dundee			Serge Cockburn	
Brian Dundee				Danny McBride
Walter "Wally" Riley Jr.				Chris Hemsworth
Lil' Donk				Margot Robbie
The Prime Minister				Hugh Jackman
J.P. Steele				Russell Crowe
Wes Windsong				Liam Hemsworth
Chief Jackson				Ruby Rose
Dr. Clark				Isla Fisher
The Cricket Legend				Luke Bracey
Bar Patron				Chris Carr
Jessica Mauboy				Herself

== Additional crew and production details ==
Film	Composer	Cinematographer	Editor	Production companies	Distributing companies	Running time
Crocodile Dundee	Peter Best	Russell Boyd	David Stiven	Rimfire Films	20th Century Fox; Hoyts Distribution; Paramount Pictures	1 hr 44 mins
Crocodile Dundee II	Peter Best	Russell Boyd	David Stiven	Rimfire Films; Paramount Pictures	20th Century Fox; Hoyts Distribution; Paramount Pictures	1 hr 52 mins
Crocodile Dundee in Los Angeles	Basil Poledouris	David Burr	Terry Blythe	Silver Lion Films; Bungalow Productions; Vision View Entertainment	Universal Pictures; Paramount Pictures	1 hr 28 mins

== Reception ==
=== Box office performance ===
Film	Release date	Box office gross			Box office ranking		Budget	Ref(s)
Film	Release date	North America	Other territories	Worldwide	All time North America	All time worldwide	Budget	Ref(s)
Crocodile Dundee	September 26, 1986	$174,803,506	$153,400,000	$328,203,506	#253	#371	$8.8 million	
Crocodile Dundee II	May 25, 1988	$109,306,210	$130,300,000	$239,606,210	#587	#570	$14 million	
Crocodile Dundee in Los Angeles	April 18, 2001	$25,635,682	$13,802,992	$39,438,674	#2,859		$21.15 million	

=== Critical and public response ===
Film	Rotten Tomatoes	Metacritic	CinemaScore
Crocodile Dundee	89% (35 reviews)	62 (13 reviews)	B+
Crocodile Dundee II	9% (32 reviews)	41 (12 reviews)	B+
Crocodile Dundee in Los Angeles	11% (82 reviews)	37 (23 reviews)	B−

== Home media ==
Paramount Pictures has released the Crocodile Dundee trilogy on Blu-ray in the U.S. on September 21, 2021. The third film is a debut for Blu-ray release.

== Other media ==
=== Super Bowl LII commercial ===
Hogan refused several proposals for more Crocodile Dundee films. In January 2018, two trailers were released online for what was marketed as another film in the series, titled Dundee, with the tagline The son of a legend returns home. The film was said to star Danny McBride as Brian Dundee, the son of the original Michael J. "Crocodile" Dundee. The trailers also feature cameo appearances by Australian actors Chris Hemsworth, Hugh Jackman, Russell Crowe, Margot Robbie, Isla Fisher, Ruby Rose, Liam Hemsworth, Jessica Mauboy, and Luke Bracey. Various aspects of the campaign made some publications believe that the film was an elaborate hoax. It was later reported that these ads were actually part of a lead up to a Super Bowl commercial for Tourism Australia. McBride and Hemsworth starred in the final commercial, which included Hogan in a cameo.

== See also ==
- The Very Excellent Mr. Dundee
