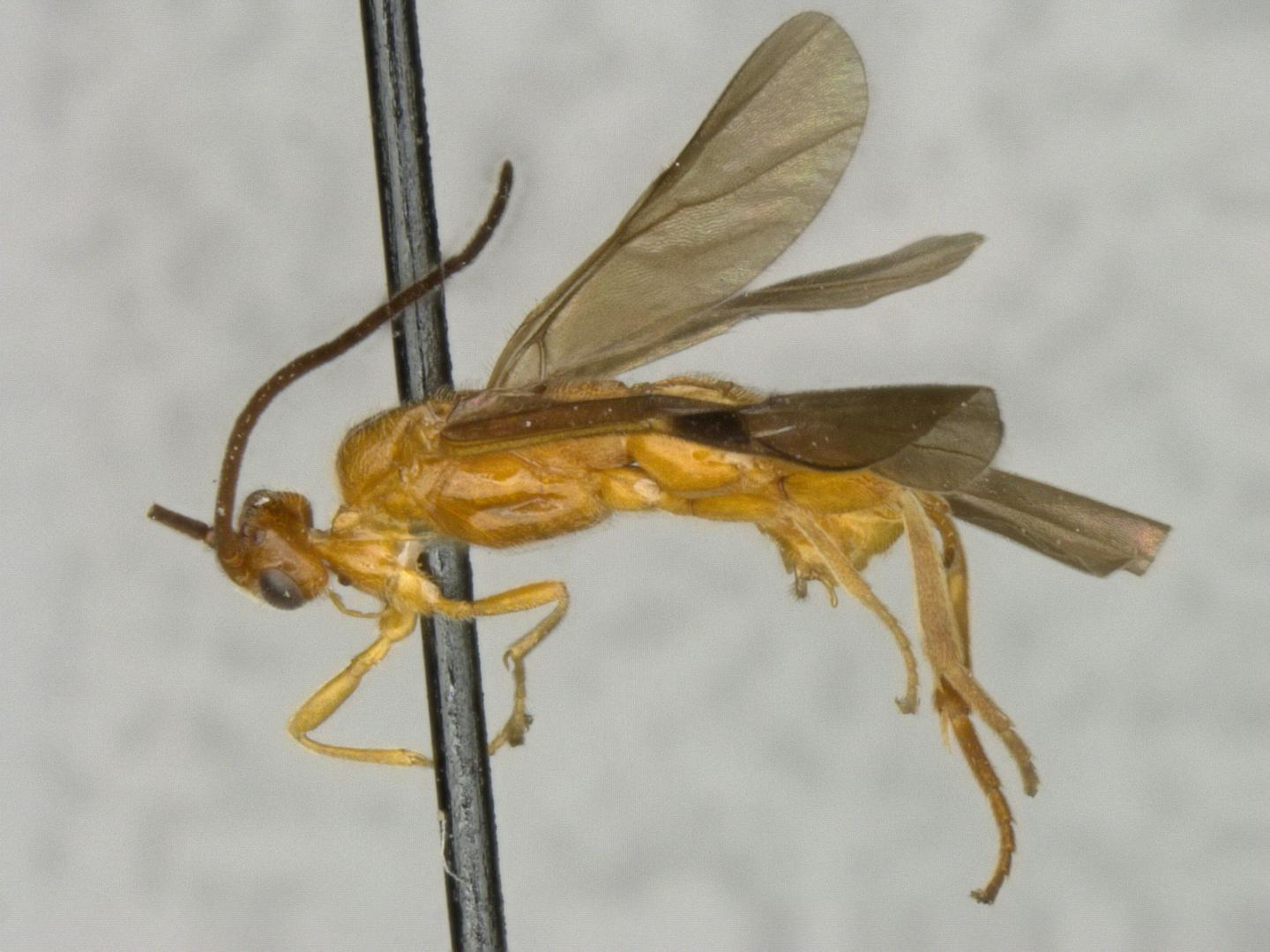
- Male holotype of Q. outbackense

Scientific classification
- Kingdom: Animalia
- Phylum: Arthropoda
- Clade: Pancrustacea
- Class: Insecta
- Order: Hymenoptera
- Family: Braconidae
- Subfamily: Microgastrinae
- Genus: Qrocodiledundee; Fernández-Triana, 2018

Species
- Qrocodiledundee outbackense Fernandez-Triana & Boudreault, 2018; Qrocodiledundee thailantis Moghaddam & Butcher, 2025

= Qrocodiledundee =

Genus of wasps

Qrocodiledundee is a genus of parasitoid wasps in the family Braconidae, with two known species only known from males. The genus was described in 2018 and named after the comedy film series Crocodile Dundee. It is known from Australia and Thailand.

== Description ==
The genus can be recognized by the flagellomeres with two rows of placodes (flat, plate-like sensory structures), the thorax relatively flattened, the pronotum enlarged dorsally, the propodeum with a lateral projection on each side near the hind margin, and with an incomplete median longitudinal ridge, the second tergite enlarged and rectangular, and the forewing without an areolet.

== Taxonomy ==
Two species are known to belong to this genus:

- Q. outbackense Fernández-Triana & Boudreault, 2018
- Q. thailantis Ghafouri Moghaddam & Butcher, 2025
