= Gerry Skilton =

Australian Actor (born 1945)

- Born: 12 March 1945 (age 81); Sydney, Australia
- Occupation: Actor
- Known for: Crocodile Dundee series

Gerry Skilton (born 12 March 1945) is an Australian actor, best known for playing the character Nugget in all three of the Crocodile Dundee series of films: Crocodile Dundee, Crocodile Dundee II, and Crocodile Dundee in Los Angeles. With permission from Paul Hogan, he reprised the character in 2010 for a proposed outback-adventure reality series Nugget Gets A Life which he self-financed and had hoped to sell to a network.

Among other roles, Skilton played Wayne Churchill in the 1986 Australian mini-series Cyclone Tracy, Corporal Andy Crilley (the ship's cook) in the 1989 British/Australian mini-series The Heroes and Reggie Muddle in the 1996 Australian film Mr. Reliable.
