= Fair Game (1986 film) =

- Film poster
- Directed by: Mario Andreacchio
- Screenplay by: Rob George
- Produced by: Ron Saunders; Harley Manners
- Starring: Cassandra Delaney; Peter Ford; David Sandford; Garry Who
- Cinematography: Andrew Lesnie
- Edited by: A.J. Prowse
- Music by: Ashley Irwin
- Production company: Southern Films International
- Distributed by: CEL Film Distribution
- Release date: 24 July 1986
- Running time: 90 minutes
- Country: Australia
- Language: English
- Budget: A$1.26 million
- Box office: AU$13,902 (Australia)

Fair Game is a 1986 Australian action thriller film directed by Mario Andreacchio from a screenplay by Rob George. Quentin Tarantino enthuses about the movie in the 2008 documentary Not Quite Hollywood.

== Plot ==
Jessica runs a wildlife sanctuary in the Outback and discovers that hunters have been illegally shooting kangaroos on her land, to sell the meat to pet food companies. As she drives into town, she is menaced by their vehicles, a transport van and a modified Ford F100. One of the hunters, Ringo, climbs onto her car, while her windscreen is broken. She notifies the police, who are indifferent and say they can do nothing without any hard evidence. She meets the leader of the hunters, Sunny, in the local store. He seems friendly and buys one of her paintings, but refuses to acknowledge that the hunters are doing anything wrong. As she leaves, Ringo attempts to take upskirt photos of her and she humiliates him.

Later, she finds a polaroid picture of her sleeping naked pinned to her fridge, and realises Ringo must have broken into her house to take it. She drives to see her friends the Taylors, where she finds Ringo and his friend Sparks using her painting for target practice. At Sunny's invitation, she borrows their rifle, and uses it to destroy Ringo's camera. In revenge, the hunters run her car off the road and pursue her on foot into the outback. She evades them, but loses her dog Kyla. When she returns to her house on foot, she finds that they have returned her broken-down car, with a dead kangaroo in the front seat. At night, they torment her horse, Frankie, and threaten her directly when she intervenes.

After hearing the hunters shooting all night, Jessica sneaks into their camp and welds their hunting rifles together, rendering them unusable. The hunters come to her house and indiscriminately blast it with their remaining weapons, destroying some outbuildings and killing many of the sanctuary animals. They then cut Jessica's clothes off, tie her to the front of the F100 and drive around the bush, to "even the score" as Sunny puts it.

Jessica steals the hunters' transport van and overturns it with Sparks inside, who survives. Riding Frankie, she then lures Ringo on his motorcycle into a canyon, with Ringo again narrowly escaping the destruction of his vehicle. She then lures the hunters into a cave and blocks them in with a rockslide. However, Ringo shoots Frankie as she is riding away. The hunters eventually escape. They destroy her house, but fall victim to traps she has placed around the property: Ringo is electrocuted, and Sparks impales himself on an anvil. Eventually, Sunny drives the F100 into a pit trap and Jessica burns him alive with a molotov cocktail. Surveying the destruction, she is reunited with Kyla, who arrives limping but alive.

== Cast ==
- Cassandra Delaney as Jessica
- Peter Ford as Sunny
- David Sandford as Ringo
- Garry Who as Sparks
- Don Barker as Frank
- Carmel Young as Moira
- Tony Clay as Derek
- Adrian Shirley as Victor

== Production ==
The movie was shot in South Australia with the assistance of the Australian Film Commission. Director Mario Andreacchio later said:

Fair Game came out of a situation where we were wanting to make a movie that was a B-grade video suspense thriller. I wanted to treat it like comic book violence – it was always like a comic book study of violence. What amazed me and the thing I found quite disappointing was that it started to become a cult film in some parts of the world and people were taking it seriously. And that, for me, became a real turning point. I thought, if people are taking this seriously, then I don't think I can make this sort of material.

== Box office ==
Fair Game grossed $13,902 at the box office in Australia.

== See also ==
- Cinema of Australia
