= Cassandra Delaney =

Australian actress (born 1961)

- Born: Cassandra Delaney; 8 September 1961 (age 64); Brisbane, Queensland, Australia
- Occupation: Actress
- Years active: 1982–present
- Spouse: John Denver (m. 1988; div. 1993)
- Children: Jesse Belle
- Family: Delvene Delaney (sister)

Cassandra Delaney (born 8 September 1961) is an Australian actress best known for her marriage to and divorce from American singer John Denver.

== Career ==
Delaney started her career in show business in 1982 with a one-off single, "Boots"—a reworked country version of the 1966 Nancy Sinatra hit "These Boots Are Made for Walkin'"—before moving into acting. Delaney starred in a number of Australian films, one of which, Fair Game (1986), has become a cult classic.

== Personal life ==
Delaney married Denver in 1988, after a two-year courtship. Settling at Denver's home in Aspen, the couple had a daughter, Jesse Belle. She and Denver separated in 1991 and divorced in 1993. Of this, his second marriage, Denver wrote "before our short-lived marriage ended in divorce, she managed to make a fool of me from one end of the valley to the other".

Delaney's older sister is actress Delvene Delaney.

== Filmography ==
=== Film ===
Year	Title	Role	Type
1984	One Night Stand	Sharon	Feature film
1985	Rebel	All Girl Band	Feature film
1986	Fair Game	Jessica	Feature film
1988	Pledge Night	Party Girl (as Cassandra)	Feature film (France)
1992	Hurricane Smith	Julie	Feature film
2008	Not Quite Hollywood: The Wild, Untold Story of Ozploitation!	Herself	Feature film documentary

=== Television ===
Year	Title	Role	Type
1987	Vietnam	Melissa	TV miniseries, 1 episode
1988	Barracuda	Cheri Scoane	TV movie
1988	Richmond Hill	Linda Preston	TV series, 3 episodes
1989	Rafferty's Rules		TV series, 1 episode
1989	Home and Away		TV series, 1 episode

=== Television (as self) ===
Year	Title	Role	Type
1988	Good Morning Australia	Guest (with John Denver)	TV series, 1 episode
1988	Christmas in Aspen	Herself	TV special, US
1992	The World Tonight	Guest	TV series, 1 episode
1992	In Sydney Today	Guest	TV series, 1 episode
1992	Tonight Live with Steve Vizard	Guest	TV series, 1 episode
1993; 2000	Good Morning Australia	Guest	TV series, 2 episodes
1998	Behind the Music	Herself	TV series, 1 episode
2002	Good Morning Australia	Guest performer (singing "Catch the Wind")	TV series, 1 episode
2013	John Denver: Country Boy	Herself	TV special, UK
2018	Fair Game: Extended Interview with Cassandra Delaney from Not Quite Hollywood	Herself	Video
