= Steve Rackman =

Australian actor and professional wrestler

Personal information
- Born: United Kingdom

Professional wrestling career
- Ring name: Steve 'Crusher' Rackman

Steve Rackman is an English-born Australian actor and professional wrestler, best known for his role as Donk in the film Crocodile Dundee. In his professional wrestling career, he wrestled under the ring name of Steve "Crusher" Rackman. Rackman was born in the United Kingdom, and worked as a doorman before he became a professional wrestler. He migrated to Australia in his teens, where he wrestled for World Championship Wrestling (Australia) on the channel Nine Network from 1973 to 1978.

== Wrestling career ==
Rackman was a wrestler first, in the 1970s, featuring alongside André the Giant for a number of years before moving into acting.

=== Championships and accomplishments ===
- World Championship Wrestling (Australia)
  - NWA Austra-Asian Tag Team Championship (1 time) – with The Missouri Mauler

== Acting career ==
He was in The Last of the Knucklemen in 1979, Turkey Shoot in 1982, and a string of other movies across the years.

Rackman played the role of Donk three times in the Crocodile Dundee movies – Crocodile Dundee, Crocodile Dundee II and Crocodile Dundee in Los Angeles.
