= Linda Kozlowski =

American actress (born 1958)

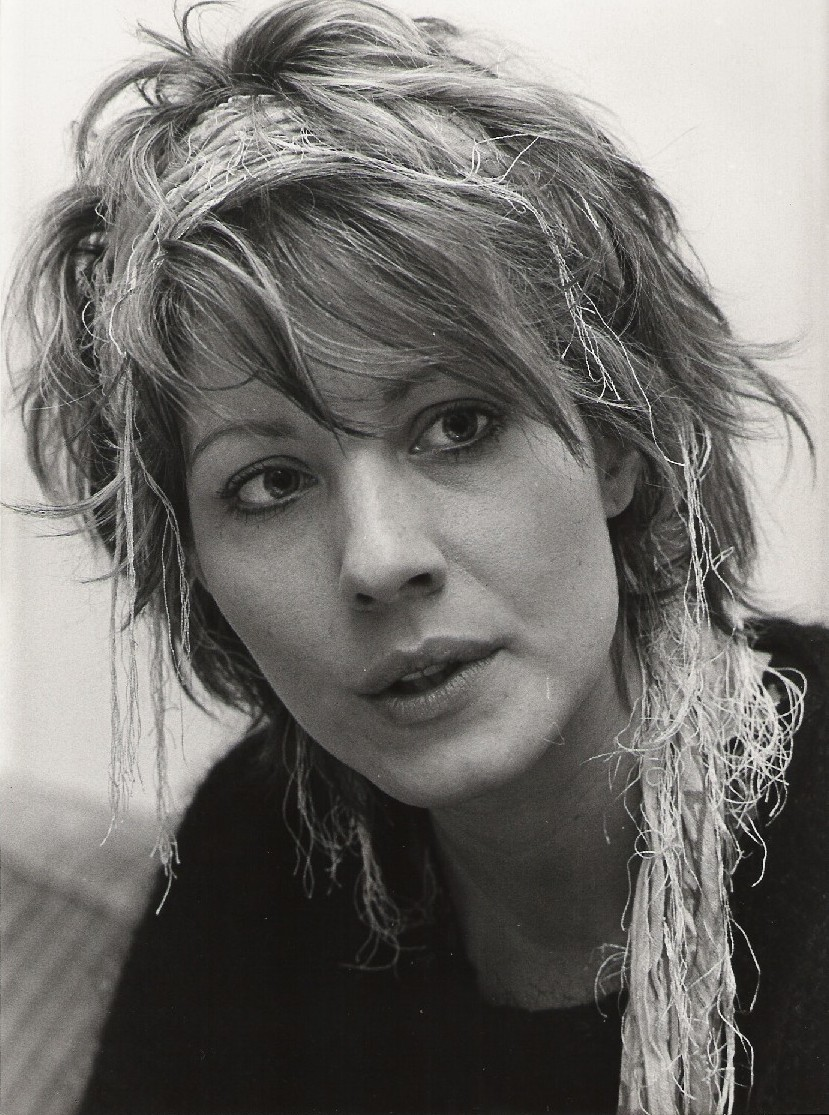
- Kozlowski in 1987
- Born: January 7, 1958 (age 68)
- Education: Juilliard School (BFA)
- Occupation: Actress
- Years active: 1982–2001
- Spouses: Paul Hogan (m. 1990; div. 2014) Moulay Hafid Baba (m. 2017)
- Children: 1

Linda Kozlowski (born January 7, 1958) is a retired American actress. She is best known for her role as Sue Charlton in the Crocodile Dundee film series (1986–2001), with the first installment earning her a Golden Globe Award nomination.

== Early life ==
Linda Kozlowski was born on January 7, 1958, the daughter of Helen E. (née Helena Parniawska) and Stanley M. Kozlowski (né Stanisław Kozłowski). She is a 1976 graduate of Fairfield Connecticut's Andrew Warde High School. Kozlowski graduated from the Juilliard School's drama division in 1981.

== Career ==
Kozlowski debuted in the 1981–1982 off-Broadway production How It All Began. She played "Miss Forsythe" on Broadway in Death of a Salesman and in 1984 took the same role for the 1985 film version.

Her big break came in 1986 when she was cast as the female lead, opposite Paul Hogan, in the Australian film Crocodile Dundee, during the filming of which their on-screen chemistry sparked a real-life romance. In 1987, Kozlowski was nominated for a Golden Globe award in the Best Supporting Actress category for her performance as Sue Charlton. Two years later, she revisited her starring role with Hogan in Crocodile Dundee II. Also, in 1988, she starred with Bill Paxton, Tim Curry and Annie Potts in Pass the Ammo and the TV miniseries Favorite Son.

Since that time, she has appeared in Almost an Angel (also starring Hogan) in 1990, Backstreet Justice (with Paul Sorvino) and The Neighbor (with Rod Steiger) in 1994, and Village of the Damned in 1995. In 2001, she starred again with Hogan in Crocodile Dundee in Los Angeles.

She has largely left the acting business because of dissatisfaction with her roles, stating: "These straight-to-video, schlocky films I was getting were giving me an ulcer, basically because I was the only one on the set that cared about anything... Between that and my biological clock, I decided to give it all away."

== Personal life ==
Kozlowski co-starred in Crocodile Dundee (1986) with Australian actor Paul Hogan, and two years later in Crocodile Dundee II, when they became a couple. They married on May 5, 1990, after his contentious divorce from his wife Noelene (initiated in 1986) was finalized. They tried to settle in Australia but moved to Los Angeles in the late 1990s.

Kozlowski and Hogan have one son, Chance. The pair divorced in 2014.

Kozlowski married Moroccan tour guide Moulay Hafid Baba in 2017. The couple live in Morocco and co-own a tour company.

== Filmography ==
Year	Title	Role	Notes
1986	Crocodile Dundee	Sue Charlton	
1987	Pass the Ammo	Claire	
1988	Crocodile Dundee II	Sue Charlton	
1990	Almost an Angel	Rose Garner	
1993	The Neighbor	Mary / Mrs. Hatch	
1994	Backstreet Justice	Keri Finnegan	
1994	Zorn	Emilie Bartlett	
1995	Village of the Damned	Jill McGowan	
2001	Crocodile Dundee in Los Angeles	Sue Charlton	(final film role)

== Awards and nominations ==
Year	Award	Category	Nominated work	Result
1987	Golden Globe Awards	Best Supporting Actress – Motion Picture	Crocodile Dundee	Nominated
1988	Bravo Otto	Best Actress	—N/a	Nominated
