= Robin Hill (Australian artist) =

Australian artist and writer (1932–2026)

Robin Hill (1932 – 8 August 2026) was an Australian artist and writer, who lived in the United States and specialised in natural history subjects, especially birds.

Hill was born in Brisbane, the capital of the Australian state of Queensland. He was trained at the Wimbledon School of Art and, after moving back to Australia in 1949, at the National Gallery of Victoria Art School and the Royal Melbourne Institute of Technology. In the early to mid 1960s, he worked for the Australian Broadcasting Corporation as the host on Bush Quest with Robin Hill. Helping to pioneer this television documentary on Australian wildlife with the producer Ken Taylor, Hill used his serious knowledge and love of birds to observe the local bird and wild life across various bush and wetlands of Victoria. Bush Quest with Robin Hill featured Hill describing the Victorian birdlife in an often improvised and poetic style as well as painting particular birds in watercolours that he had observed during the making of each episode. The Australian Broadcasting Corporation produced a total of six 30-minute episodes all in black and white. During this period of the 1960s, as well as producing and exhibiting his paintings, Hill was commissioned by a popular biscuit company to produce paintings for biscuit tins. These tins featured Hill's paintings of birds and circulated commercially within Australia at the time. Hill moved to the United States in 1971, where he established studios in Virginia and Washington D.C. Since then he has had several exhibitions, including a solo show at the Corcoran Gallery of Art and an exhibition cosponsored by the World Wildlife Fund and the Australian Embassy. He has also undertaken numerous commissions. During the 1970s and 1980s, for example, Hill was commissioned to paint complete sets of American birds—The Endangered Species; The Ducks, Geese, and Swans; The Upland Game Birds; The Birds of Prey; and The Marsh Birds.

== Background ==
Robin Hill was born in 1932, in the city of Brisbane in Queensland, Australia. When he was one, he and his family moved to England where he lived until he was 16. During his childhood in England, he developed his passion for observing Wildlife and the natural environment which later fuelled his art. Whilst living in England, at the age of 11 he began taking classes at the Wimbledon College of Arts in London. In 1949, at the age of 16, Hill moved back to Australia with his family. He transferred to National Gallery Art school where he was enrolled in for two years. Hill then transferred to the Royal Melbourne Institute of Technology (known at the time as the Melbourne Technical College) where he took classes until he began his hiatus from education. Hill was also a pioneer in the area of Turkey rearing. For three years, Hill lived on native Australian bushland around the Murrumbidgee River area, pausing his education to immerse himself in the Australian environment. After the three years of living in the bush, Hill returned to the Royal Melbourne Institute of Technology for another two years until he graduated. In this same year, Hill began his permanent residence in America, setting up art studios in the states of Virginia and Washington D.C.

He was married in 1963 to Australian Actress Betty Bobbitt with whom he had a son Christopher Hill. In 1966, Hill and Bobbitt divorced. Hill went on to marry Marcia née McGee, whom he met in 1971 whilst exhibiting his paintings in Middleburg at the Sporting Gallery.

Hill died on 8 August 2026, at the age of 94.

== Education ==
Hill attended the Wimbledon School of Art at age eleven during the 1940s, this being the first art education he undertook. Hill went on to study at the National Gallery Art school in Melbourne in 1949 taking painting classes, during which he won a student prize for a landscape artwork of demolished buildings in the suburb of Carlton, Victoria. After two years at the National Gallery Art School, Hill then attended Royal Melbourne Institute of Technology where he enrolled in Harold Freedman's ‘The Art of the Book’ four year book design course studying typography and illustration. During the final year of his education at the Royal Melbourne Institute of Technology, Hill was awarded with an illustration prize as well as a scholarship that funded his tuition. He graduated from the Royal Melbourne Institute of Technology with a diploma in book designing.

== Career ==
During the pause Hill took from his education at the Royal Melbourne Institute of Technology, he lived in the Australian bush and took on temporary seasonal occupation to support this lifestyle. Hill developed a wide range of occupations and skills including sheep shearing, blacksmithing, cattle herding, boundary riding, fruit picking and rail road track working. After graduating Hill took on various jobs that utilised the illustration skills he developed at the Royal Melbourne Institute of Technology, he worked for a packaging company designing packaging for three months, this being his first artistic employment. He then went on to work for an advertising agency, followed by working as a magazine illustrator for two years. He then taught art classes two years in clay sculpting, illustration and painting, among other artistic techniques. Hill's first profitable exhibition was held in 1958 at the Australian Galleries where he exhibited lithographs of birds of prey. His works sold out and he received around 500 pounds. After this, he went on to continue teaching whilst doing commissions.

=== Television series ===
Throughout the 1970s, Hill was involved graphic work for television, employed first by ABV2 television's graphic design department for which he designed the televised animations and title graphics for the Australian Broadcasting Corporation's first televised nature documentary series Bush Quest with Robin Hill with director and producer Ken Taylor. This series began broadcasting in 1970, with Hill as the host providing observations and commentary on bird species in the state of Victoria. The success of his contribution to wildlife television on the ABC was foundational for the formation of the 1973 ABC Natural History Unit. Hill increased traction for wildlife documentaries on the ABC with the series Wild Australia being based on Hill's series. The series focused on observing a wide range of species to showcase diversity and the importance of environmental sustainability, this being a common focus in 1970's wildlife documentaries. The series emphasised environmental issues of which Ken Taylor and Hill had become aware observing degradation of habitats in New South Wales. The series advocated for conservation of natural habitats, cultivating a rising awareness of environmental issues in Australian television, adding to a trend of televised recognition of human impact on the environmental that was gathering pace in the 1970s.

=== Paintings ===
Hill's subject-matter and capability is broad; he has painted not only birds, but also animals such as dogs and farm animals and human portraits, still life, landscapes, industrial sites and pre-Columbian ruins, in as watercolour, gouache and oils.

==== Inspiration ====
During Robin Hill's childhood he began birdwatching and observation of wildlife which inspired his later art. Hill also attributes the development of his artistic style to the drawings made while living in the bush and observing native birds in the Australian environment first-hand. The book designing course he took at the Royal Melbourne Institute of Technology further developed his natural history drawing style. His connection with the course's coordinator Harold Freedman led him to create a collection of Australian bird lithographs, with Freedman encouraging his artistic ability. His lithographs of birds of prey were exhibited by the Royal Melbourne Institute of Technology's print and lithography group exhibition. This was a catalyst for Hill's first commercial exhibition in the Australian Galleries in 1958, in which he exhibited around thirty paintings of birds of prey inspired by his lithographs. It took him eighteen months to prepare all the paintings he presented at this exhibition. A second exhibition in 1960 at the Australian Galleries built on its success. Hill has traveled extensively during the course of his artistic career, drawing inspiration from many species of birds from countries including Africa, Australia, Britain and America. An inspiration is other artists; Botticelli, Durer, Reubens and Michelangelo and there is also an eastern influence on Hill's works from Japanese screen prints and Chinese scroll paintings of animals.

==== Technique ====
The construction of Hill's watercolour artworks either develops from museum skin references or birdwatching sketches done in the natural environment. Hill's utilisation of museum skins as references for his works has brought both negative and positive criticism. Hill's works are often painted on watercolour canvases; these canvases are prepared with a wetted sponge to allow the watercolour background wash to be applied.

==== Exhibitions ====
Hill had works exhibited in many galleries, these include; the Australian Galleries in Melbourne, the Tyron Galleries in London, the Morris Museum of Art in Georgia and the Corcoran Gallery of Art in Washington D.C. Hill has had several exhibitions in many cities, such as; Melbourne, Sydney, Johannesburg, London, New York, Middleburg, Virginia, Georgia and Washington D. C. During the 1980s Hill had developed a set of paintings of upland game birds that were exhibited throughout various cities in America as part of a traveling exhibition held by the Smithsonian Institution. Hill has a permanent exhibition of more than two hundred endangered species of ducks, geese, swans, upland game birds, birds of prey and marsh birds at the Morris Museum of Art. His artistic presentation of endangered species contributes a promotion of awareness of environmental sustainability to the museum. Hill also went on to contribute works to a traveling exhibition that supported the World Wildlife Fund, this collection of works was titled the vanishing series and it included paintings of endangered and extinct bird species from North America. Hill was also commissioned in the 1980s by Clyde's Restaurant Group to create eighteen watercolour bird paintings that was displayed among the restaurants all of which were on large canvases, among these paintings was a nine by five feet triptych.

=== Publications ===
In addition to numerous articles in newspapers and magazines, Hill's publications include:

- 1960. Australia’s Waterfowl. (Text by M.C. Downes and Ina Watson). Victoria: Fisheries & Wildlife.
- 1962. Bushland and Seashore. An Australian nature adventure. Melbourne: Lansdowne Press.
- 1967. Australian Birds. Melbourne: Thomas Nelson.
- 1968. Bush Quest. Melbourne: Lansdowne Press.
- 1970. The Corner. A naturalist's journeys in south-eastern Australia. Melbourne: Lansdowne Press.
- 1987. The Waterfowl of North America. Augusta, GA: Morris Communications Corporation

From his experience of sailing, Hill has written for the magazine Cruising World; informative columns on bird species such as the brown pelican, the great blue heron and the snowy egret illustrated with original sketches of the birds. He participated the One-Two Race event held by Cruising World in Bermuda in 1981, but dropped out due to issues with the self-steering system of his Folkboat.

== Critical reception ==
Walkabout columnist P. J. Kadwell has compared Hill to the American ornithologist and painter Roger Peterson, praising Hill's works for their contribution to the reference catalogue of Australian bird species. Another Walkabout columnist Graham Pizzey regarded Hill highly, and owned his painting of egrets. A third Walkabout columnist Peter Fenton appraises Hill's unique talent and precision.

Reviews of his first exhibition of bird paintings at the Australian Galleries in 1958 were positive, with praise from the art critics Arnold Shore in the Melbourne Age and Alan Warren in the Sun News-Pictorial. The exhibition sold out earning Hill around five hundred euros. Hill's second exhibition at Australian Galleries in 1960 also received further critical commendation to Hill's profit. His published works were well received; Australian Birds sold over 30,000 copies within its first week of sales, and Bushland and Seashore won a design award. Bushland and Seashore was ranked in the top 25 of books representing the best of Australian publishing by a panel of book sellers in 1962. Hill's publishing success also led to the commissioning of his book Australian Birds by Thomas Nelson, Ltd.

== Legacy ==
Hill's works have inspired other artists; Brett Jarret has specifically taken inspiration from Hill's book Australian Birds.
