= Almost an Angel =

1990 American comedy-drama film by John Cornell

- Theatrical release poster
- Directed by: John Cornell
- Written by: Paul Hogan
- Produced by: John Cornell
- Starring: Paul Hogan; Elias Koteas; Linda Kozlowski
- Cinematography: Russell Boyd
- Edited by: David Stiven
- Music by: Maurice Jarre
- Production company: Ironbark Films
- Distributed by: Paramount Pictures
- Release date: December 19, 1990
- Running time: 95 minutes
- Country: United States
- Language: English
- Budget: $25 million
- Box office: $6 million

Almost an Angel is a 1990 American fantasy comedy-drama film directed by John Cornell and written and starring Paul Hogan. The original music score was composed by Maurice Jarre.

== Plot ==
Terry Dean, a professional burglar specializing in sabotaging electronic surveillance systems, stands before his release from yet another stint in prison. He decides to switch to bank robbery, with a special twist: first by having the security cameras record TV shows he would connect them to with a modified universal remote control, then entering disguised as a celebrity; the confusion over this unexpected appearance would distract witnesses.

Terry's first heist (disguised as Willie Nelson) is successful, but shortly afterwards he witnesses a young boy about to be run over by a van; he pushes the child away and is himself hit. While in the hospital, he has a nebulous experience in which he meets God. Though Terry has lived a sinful life, his last deed has earned him a second chance to save his soul—by doing God's work as an angel in training.

After reawakening, Terry tries another bank hold-up disguised as Rod Stewart, but a gang of amateur robbers interferes. As they escape, the youngest of the three thugs tries to shoot Terry, but the gun was loaded with blanks. Thinking himself to be an immortal Angel, Terry reconsiders his ways, seeks advice in a church (and donates/returns the money from his Nelson heist), and then follows several 'signs' to another town (“Moses Bros. Moving Company” and “Paradise Bar”). In a bar, he meets Steve Garner, an embittered young man who uses a wheelchair due to a terminal illness. To bring Steve out of his self-pity, Terry engages him in a fist-fight on equal terms, sitting fixed on a stool. Steve, taken with Terry's acceptance of him as a person, strikes up a friendship with Terry and offers him a place to stay at the youth center for children and teens that he runs with his sister Rose.

Rose is suspicious about Terry, but he proves himself by intimidating two drug dealers into leaving the center, teaching the kids boxing techniques, and fixing the arcade games, and Rose falls in love with him. The center, however, is in financial difficulties, since its backer George Bealeman refuses to provide more funds. Since he has no angel's powers, Terry uses his technical know-how to convince Bealeman otherwise: by recording and re-editing a segment from TV evangelist Rev. Barton's telecast (which Bealeman watches reverently) and fitting the cross at the rooftop of the center's church with lighting effects, triggered by his universal remote. While helping Terry out with the dealers and rigging the broadcast, Steve learns about Terry's past but decides “he’s not really a scumbag”.

In the evening, where Bealeman drops by, two police detectives close in on Terry. Steve, who overheard them, rushes off in his wheelchair to warn Terry. However, a sack of glass bottles Steve is carrying breaks while he outmaneuvers the detective chasing him, and his femoral artery is cut, causing him to bleed out. Just after Bealeman has left, who has been inspired via Terry to build a new center, Steve arrives at the center and delivers his warning. Afraid of death, Steve feels lost but is reassured he will find a place in Heaven when Terry uses the remote to trigger the lighted cross, creating a sign from God. No longer afraid of death, Steve dies peacefully in the arms of Terry and Rose.

Terry then announces that he has to leave and tries to comfort Rose, revealing that he is "almost an angel." Rose is skeptical, but after Terry leaves, she checks his universal remote, only to discover that it contains no batteries. As she stares up at the cross, it shines brilliantly on its own. Rose runs after Terry and calls out to him. Distracted, Terry slips and falls before a speeding truck and is about to be run over. Rose is shocked to witness that the truck passes through him, proving he really had died and was given another chance as an angel. Having passed his test, Terry continues on his quest to do God's work (though not without promising to return), and Rose is left comforted.

== Cast ==
- Paul Hogan as Terry Dean
- Elias Koteas as Steve Garner
- Linda Kozlowski as Rose Garner
- Doreen Lang as Mrs. Garner
- Douglas Seale as Father
- Ruth Warshawsky as Irene Bealeman
- Parley Baer as George Bealeman
- Michael Alldredge as Sergeant Freebody
- David Alan Grier as Detective Bill
- Larry Miller as Teller
- Travis Venable as Bubba
- Robert Sutton as Guido
- Ben Slack as Reverend Barton, TV Evangelist
- Troy Curvey Jr. as Tom, The Guard
- Eddie Frias as Young Guard Trainee
- Charlton Heston as God

== Reception ==
=== Box office ===
The film was a commercial failure. It grossed just under $7 million in ticket sales against a $25 million budget.

=== Critical response ===
On Rotten Tomatoes it has an approval rating of 33% based on reviews from 9 critics. Audiences surveyed by CinemaScore gave the film a grade "B" on scale of A to F.

Roger Ebert of the Chicago Sun-Times gave it 2.5 out of 4, writing that "the going gets a little thick at the end, and some of the plot developments are dumb... But that isn't to say I'm scornful of the film's special qualities and its gentle good humor."

Kevin Thomas of the Los Angeles Times wrote that "Almost an Angel might just as well be called "Crocodile" Dundee Gets Religion" and added that "the chronic dearth of family films, plus Hogan’s undeniable laid-back appeal, may work to the film’s advantage over the holidays, but Almost an Angel really belongs on the tube."

Chris Hicks of the Deseret News in Salt Lake City wrote that "this Frank Capra-style comedy manages a gentle, occasionally sweet nature, but "Almost An Angel" just isn't funny enough—and at times not even interesting enough—to hold the attention of the audience. In fact, like its star, this movie is so low-key it often seems half-asleep."

Hal Hinson of The Washington Post wrote that "watching Paul Hogan in "Almost an Angel" is like watching somebody take his afternoon nap, and just about as exciting. Hogan, who made his international reputation as "Crocodile" Dundee and wrote as well as executive-produced this new project, delivers his lines here as if the sandman had just sprinkled his script—he gives them the Perry Como treatment. He blinks once for the setup, twice for the punch line."

Janet Maslin of The New York Times said that "it will be a true miracle if Almost an Angel attracts even a small audience, let alone finds its way to a place alongside Mr. Hogan's Crocodile Dundee in box-office heaven", adding that "Mr. Hogan remains a modest, benign comic figure, but the energy that has been spent on keeping him busy here could barely run a light bulb."

== See also ==
- List of films about angels
