= The Paul Hogan Show =

1973–1984 Australian comedy TV series

- Genre: Variety
- Written by: Bill Harding; Paul Hogan; John Cornell
- Directed by: Peter Faiman
- Starring: Paul Hogan; John Cornell
- Country of origin: Australia
- Original language: English
- No. of seasons: 12
- No. of episodes: 60

Production
- Executive producers: Paul Hogan; John Cornell
- Producer: James Fishburn
- Production location: TCN-9 Willoughby, New South Wales (1978 – 1984)
- Cinematography: Tony Bartuccio
- Camera setup: multi-camera setup
- Running time: 50 minutes

Original release
- Network: Seven Network (1973 – 1977); Nine Network (1978 – 1984)
- Release: 1973 – 1984

The Paul Hogan Show is an Australian comedy show which aired on Australian television from 1973 until 1984 for a total of 12 seasons and 60 episodes. It made a star of Paul Hogan, who later appeared in Crocodile Dundee. Hogan's friend (and producer of Crocodile Dundee) John Cornell also appeared in the show, playing Hogan's dim flatmate Strop.

== Premise ==
Episodes of the series generally opened with Hogan, playing a version of himself he called 'Hoges', presenting a stand-up comedy routine dressed in his bridge rigger's costume of boots, shorts, and shirt with sleeves cut off. The show then presented a series of comedy sketches, usually with Hogan in the lead role and playing various recurring characters, including:

- Leo Wanker: an inept daredevil stuntman;
- George Fungus: a take-off of real-life television journalist George Negus of the Australian 60 Minutes;
- Super Dag: an ocker superhero complete with terry-towelling hat and zinc-creamed nose. His powers include his ability to use his esky in innovative ways;
- Perce the Wino: an old drunken derro who starred in a series of silent, Benny Hill-style, sketches;
- Donger: variants of this beer-gutted character include Sgt Donger, the tough cop with a bionic beer-gut.
- Arthur Dunger: a caricature of the suburban tinny-chugging Australian male.
- Nigel Lovelace: a skateboarding eleven-year-old ("almost twelve" as they say in the show);
- The Phantom: a parody of the famous comic book hero The Phantom
- Luigi: a magician with a thick Italian accent who spectacularly fails at attempted magic tricks. Sometimes he would have an assistant called Maria - Luigi would shout "dance-a Maria!!" to distract attention.

Another recurring sketch featured Hogan again playing "himself" as Hoges, depicting the character's situation of living the carefree bachelor life in a disorderly apartment with his flatmate Strop.

The show would generally end with him in his bridge painter getup trying to flip cigarettes into his mouth.

The series also regularly featured attractive female models and actresses in its sketches - frequently in revealing costumes. Television actress and presenter Delvene Delaney (who later married Cornell) was the most frequent and best-known of these. Other women to appear in the series were Sue McIntosh, Karen Pini, Anya Saleky, Karen West and Abigail.

Many sketches in the show were parodies of contemporary television shows. These included "Thick 'Ead" (Mastermind), "Pot o'Brass" (Pot o'Gold), "A Casual Affair" (A Current Affair) "Sale of the Week" (Sale of the Century), and "Benny Five'O" (a Benny Hill-inspired take-off of Hawaii Five-O).

== Theme music ==
The theme music was taken from the second movement of Tchaikovsky's Symphony No.5. This music was also used in contemporary advertisements for Winfield cigarettes, which featured Hogan.

== Reception ==
The show was very popular in Australia and was compared to Saturday Night Live and The Benny Hill Show. The series also became popular in the UK as a result of its scheduling within peak time on the new Channel 4, and was one of the shows shown on its launch night on 2 November 1982.

== Networks ==
After appearances on A Current Affair and specials for the Nine Network, Hogan and Cornell fell out with network owner Clyde Packer. The first three seasons from 1973 to 1975 of the Paul Hogan Show were on the Seven Network until Kerry Packer took over Channel 9 and invited them back.

== See also ==
- List of Australian television series
- Ocker
