= Delvene Delaney =

Australian actress (born 1951)

- Born: 26 August 1951 (age 75); Mackay, Queensland, Australia
- Occupations: Actress; television presenter; singer
- Years active: 1970−1986
- Known for: The Young Doctors (129 episodes); Sale of the Century (as co-host)
- Spouse: John Cornell (m. 1977; died 2021)
- Children: 2
- Family: Cassandra Delaney

Delvene Delaney (born 26 August 1951) is an Australian actress of soap opera and film, television presenter and singer.

== Early life ==
Delaney was born in Mackay, Queensland, Australia, on 26 August 1951.

The beauty pageant winner found fame on Australian television in the 1970s, initially as a weather presenter on Brisbane television.

== Career ==
She is best known for her with stints in soap operas including the local series The Box as Penny O'Brien in 1974, and internationally The Young Doctors as nurse Jojo Adams from 1976 to 1977.

Delaney became better known as a recurring cast member of The Paul Hogan Show in the late 1970s.

She made regular appearances as a panel member on the game show Blankety Blanks from 1977 to 1979. She was co-presenter of the local version of quiz show Sale of the Century from 1982 to 1986, opposite Tony Barber.

She now works for the Byron Bay Wildlife Hospital.

== In popular culture ==
Delaney was portrayed by actress Cariba Heine in Channel 9's 2012 biographical TV miniseries Howzat! Kerry Packer's War.

== Personal life ==
Delaney was married to The Paul Hogan Show co-star John Cornell for 44 years until his death in July 2021. They have two children.

Delaney's younger sister is actress Cassandra Delaney.

== Filmography ==
=== Film ===
Year	Film	Character	Director
1974	The Runner		Film short
1975	End Play	Janine Talbot	Feature film

=== Television ===
Year	Title	Character	Type
1970	Brisbane Nightly News	Weather presenter	TV series, regular
1974	The Box	Penny O'Brien	TV series, 22 episodes
1975	High Rollers	Hostess	TV series
1975	Celebrity Squares	Regular panelist	TV series
1975–1984	The Paul Hogan Show	'The Sheila' & various characters	TV series
1976–1977	The Young Doctors	Jojo Adams	TV series, 129 episodes
1978	Chopper Squad	Carol Webber	TV series, 1 episode
1981	The Love Boat in Australia	Cruise director Yvonne Petty	TV miniseries, 2 episodes
1982	The New You Asked For It	Host	TV series, US
1983	Paul Hogan's England	Various characters	TV special, UK
1983–1985	Sale of the Century	Co-host	TV series
1984	Paul Hogan Stung	Various characters	TV special
2019	Australian Story	Presenter	TV series, 1 episode
2022	Roast of Paul Hogan	Herself	TV special
