= Crocodile Dundee II =

1988 film directed by John Cornell

- Theatrical release poster by Dan Gouzee
- Directed by: John Cornell
- Written by: Paul Hogan; Brett Hogan
- Produced by: John Cornell; Jane Scott
- Starring: Paul Hogan; Linda Kozlowski; John Meillon; Hechter Ubarry; Juan Fernández; Charles S. Dutton
- Cinematography: Russell Boyd
- Edited by: David Stiven
- Music by: Peter Best
- Production company: Rimfire Films
- Distributed by: Hoyts Distribution (Australia); Paramount Pictures (International)
- Release dates: 20 May 1988 (Australia); 25 May 1988 (North America)
- Running time: 112 minutes
- Countries: Australia; United States
- Language: English
- Budget: $14 million
- Box office: $239.6 million

Crocodile Dundee II is a 1988 action comedy film and the second installment of the Crocodile Dundee trilogy. It is a sequel to Crocodile Dundee (1986) and was followed by Crocodile Dundee in Los Angeles (2001). Actors Paul Hogan and Linda Kozlowski reprise their roles as Mick Dundee and Sue Charlton, respectively, here shown opposing a Colombian drug cartel.

The film was directed by John Cornell and shot on location in New York City and Northern Territory, Australia. It cost $14 million to make. The film received negative reviews from critics upon release.

== Plot ==
Australian bushman Mick Dundee and American journalist Sue Charlton are living together in New York City. Although Mick's ignorance of city life is a hazard when he attempts to continue his former lifestyle by, for example, blast fishing in Manhattan's waters, Sue's writing and his easy-going personality have made him popular. Mick decides he needs a job to occupy his time and is offered work by a friend, Leroy Brown, a mild-mannered man trying to live up to the tough guy image evoked by his name.

Sue's ex-husband, Bob Tanner, while working for the U.S. Drug Enforcement Administration in Colombia, takes photographs of a drug cartel leader, Luis Rico, personally murdering a man and is spotted by one of the cartel's sentries. He mails the photographs to Sue before he is himself murdered.

Rico and his top lieutenant, Miguel, go to New York to retrieve the photos from Sue. They kidnap her, and Rico, learning that the envelope containing the photographs is in Mick’s possession, instructs him to take it to a subway station for an exchange in what is actually an attempt to kidnap him, too, but Mick escapes.

After an attempt is then made on his life, Mick turns to Leroy for help to extract Sue from Rico’s Long Island mansion. Leroy’s street reputation enables him to introduce Mick to Rat, the leader of a street gang; Rat agrees to create a distraction outside the mansion, which allows Mick to get in and rescue Sue.

Rico goes into hiding to avoid arrest, and after his henchmen fail in a subsequent attempt to kill Sue, Mick decides to take Sue to Australia to protect her on familiar ground. In Walkabout Creek, Mick is enthusiastically welcomed back by his friends. He and Sue take refuge in “Belonga Mick”, or Mick’s Place, a large plot of land he legally owns.

Rico and his men eventually track Mick and Sue to Australia, where they hire some locals to assist them, but their Aboriginal tracker promptly abandons the group upon learning that their quarry is Mick. Rico’s men then take Mick's friend Walter hostage; Rico threatens to kill Walter, but Mick saves him by faking an attempt to shoot him.

Rico believes that Mick tried to kill Walter because he is the best person to guide them, so he keeps him alive to serve as a replacement tracker. Walter, guided surreptitiously by Mick, then leads Rico and his men on a false trail through the Outback, as Mick, with Sue’s help and that of Aboriginal friends he summons with a bullroarer, reduces the opposition's numbers one by one by capturing them and holding them prisoner in a cave. Mick frees Walter by faking his being killed by a crocodile; this leaves Rico and Miguel to face Mick alone. When Walter tells Sue what Mick is planning to do, she leaves the cave to join Mick, and Walter goes with her.

Rico sets a bushfire in a ploy to corner Mick, but Mick captures Rico and switches clothes with him to lure Miguel into a vulnerable position, not expecting Sue and Walter to show up. Seeing the pair from a distance, Walter shoots Mick thinking he is Rico, Miguel shoots Rico thinking he is Mick, and Sue then shoots and kills Miguel; Rico falls down an escarpment to his death, but Sue and Walter initially believe the body is Mick’s until one of the Aboriginals tells them about the clothing switch. Mick, whom Walter's shot has only wounded, walks up, and he and Sue embrace. He asks her if she is ready to go home, meaning to New York City, to which she replies, "I am home."

== Cast ==
- Paul Hogan as Michael J. "Crocodile" Dundee
- Linda Kozlowski as Susan 'Sue' Charlton
- John Meillon as Walter Reilly
- Hechter Ubarry as Luis Rico
- Juan Fernández as Miguel
- Charles S. Dutton as Leroy Brown
- Kenneth Welsh as Brannigan
- Stephen Root as DEA Agent
- Dennis Boutsikaris as Bob Tanner
- Ernie Dingo as Charlie
- Steve Rackman as Donk
- Gerry Skilton as Nugget
- Gus Mercurio as Frank
- Susie Essman as Tour Guide
- Colin Quinn as Onlooker at Mansion
- Luis Guzman as Jose
- Alec Wilson as Denning
- Jim Holt as Erskine
- Bill Sandy as Teddy The Aboriginal Tracker
- Alfred Coolwell as Aboriginal
- Tatyana Ali as Park Girl
- Jace Alexander as Rat
- Betty Bobbitt as Tourist, a Meg
- Anthony Crivello as Subway Hitman

== Release ==
=== Theatrical ===
The film opened 25 May 1988 in the United States and Canada on a record 2,837 screens. In 1987, during the film's production, Paramount outbid the international unit of 20th Century-Fox for the worldwide rights to the film's sequel.

== Reception ==
=== Box office ===
Crocodile Dundee II was also a worldwide hit, but not as big as its predecessor.

The film set an opening weekend record in Australia with a gross of A$2,005,536 and went on to gross $24,916,805 in Australia, which is equivalent to $59,890,392 in 2022 dollars. It was the second highest-grossing Australian film in Australia behind the original.

The film was released theatrically in the United States by Paramount Pictures in May 1988. For its first six days of American release, its box office receipts of US$29.2 million exceeded those of Rambo III at $21.2 million. It grossed $109,306,210 at the box office in the United States and Canada. It was the second highest-grossing film that year for Paramount (second only to Coming to America) and the sixth highest-grossing film at the United States box office. It also had the biggest opening ever in the United Kingdom with an opening week gross of £2,797,164, including a record opening week gross for a European cinema of £169,139 at the Odeon Leicester Square.

=== Critical response ===
Janet Maslin of The New York Times deemed the sequel to be inferior, noting "the novelty has begun to wear thin, even if Mr. Hogan remains generally irresistible". Variety called the film "a disappointing follow-up to the disarmingly charming first feature with Aussie star Paul Hogan. [This] sequel is too slow to constitute an adventure and has too few laughs to be a comedy – resulting in a mildly entertaining 111 minutes that has much less of the freshness and spark that legions of filmgoers loved in the original". Gene Siskel of the Chicago Tribune gave the film two-and-a-half stars out of four and wrote that it "has too much action initially, losing its trademark, gentle touch for the first half of the movie. The film is much more compelling in its concluding scenes in the Australian outback than in its comedy-action scenes in New York City that open the film. The result is that we leave the theater with a bit of a smile, but just a bit. It's not a steady, complete film." On At the Movies, Siskel's co-reviewer Roger Ebert said the film deserves credit for retaining the imagination of the original, in that Dundee continues to defeat adversaries using his wits and survival knowledge rather than turning into a "violent superman" as many action heroes do in sequels, but he nonetheless joined Siskel in giving it "two thumbs down". Kevin Thomas of the Los Angeles Times was generally positive, calling it "almost as much fun the second time around. As an adventure, it's nothing special, yet it's an inspired and good-humored presentation of one of the freshest, most likable screen personalities to emerge in the past decade." Hal Hinson of The Washington Post called the film "about as laid-back a movie as you're ever likely to nap through. The actors take forever to recite their lines, and scenes unfold as if the filmmakers had rented the screen by the month." Hinson added that Cornell "seems not to have understood that for Dundee's heroic laconicism to work, the world around him has to have some energy, it's got to move. But Cornell doesn't know how to create pace or movement. He directs as if he were swinging in a hammock."

On review aggregator Rotten Tomatoes the film has a score of 12% from 33 reviews. The critics consensus reads, "Retelling its predecessor's same joke with diminishing returns, Crocodile Dundee II sees the franchise's enjoyability go down under." On Metacritic the film has a score of 41% based on reviews from 21 critics, indicating "mixed or average reviews". Audiences polled by CinemaScore gave the film an average grade of "B+" on an A+ to F scale, the same grade as its predecessor.

== Sequel ==
A sequel titled Crocodile Dundee in Los Angeles, was released in 2001.
