= Peter Faiman =

Australian film director

Peter Faiman AM
- Born: Peter Leonard Faiman; 1944 (age 81–82); Melbourne, Victoria, Australia
- Occupations: Television executive; TV producer; film producer and director
- Years active: 1971–present

Peter Leonard Faiman AM (born 1944) is an Australian television producer with experience in film, live television and events. He has had a long-standing working relationship with the Nine Network.

== Biography ==
Faiman was born in Melbourne. He directed/produced the Paul Hogan Show and the Graham Kennedy and Don Lane shows for about six years of its eight-and-a-half-year run. He also produced a show hosted by Bert Newton and one by Ernie Sigley. In 1981, he was awarded the Member of the Order of Australia in the 1981 Queen's New Years Honours List for his services to the media, particularly in the field of television production.

Faiman was involved in several Rupert Murdoch projects, including in the UK as creative and management consultant at BSkyB, and in the US at the Fox Network, where he produced the Emmy Award-winning news magazine program The Reporters and A Current Affair in New York City. He went on to become Vice President of Fox Circle Productions and later President of Programs and Production at 20th Century Fox Television in Los Angeles. He guided the launch of the FX Network in New York in 1994, and was the coordinating director for the opening and closing broadcasts of the Sydney 2000 Olympic Games on behalf of the Sydney Olympic Broadcasting Organisation (SOBO).

Faiman directed the 1986 blockbuster film Crocodile Dundee, and the 1991 American comedy Dutch, which was a box office disappointment. He also produced the 1992 animated feature FernGully: The Last Rainforest.

Since returning to Australia in 2002, he has been a program consultant for the Australian Broadcasting Corporation, acting as a consulting producer on Strictly Ballroom, Spicks and Specks and The Pet Show. Faiman also helped conceptualise the Webby Award-winning multi-platform project SkillsOne.
