= Crocodile Dundee in Los Angeles =

2001 film by Simon Wincer

- Theatrical release poster
- Directed by: Simon Wincer
- Written by: Eric Abrams; Matthew Berry
- Based on: Characters by Paul Hogan
- Produced by: Paul Hogan; Lance Hool
- Starring: Paul Hogan; Linda Kozlowski; Jere Burns; Jonathan Banks; Aida Turturro; Paul Rodriguez
- Cinematography: David Burr
- Edited by: Terry Blythe
- Music by: Basil Poledouris
- Production companies: Silver Lion Films; Bangalow Films
- Distributed by: Paramount Pictures (United States and Canada); Universal Pictures (through United International Pictures; select territories)
- Release dates: 12 April 2001 (Australia); 18 April 2001 (United States)
- Running time: 95 minutes
- Countries: United States; Australia
- Language: English
- Budget: $25 million
- Box office: $39.4 million

Crocodile Dundee in Los Angeles is a 2001 action comedy film directed by Simon Wincer and starring Paul Hogan. It is the sequel to Crocodile Dundee II (1988), and the third and final installment of the Crocodile Dundee series. Hogan and Linda Kozlowski reprise their roles as Michael "Crocodile" Dundee and Sue Charlton, respectively.

The film was shot on location in Los Angeles and in Queensland. Actor Paul Hogan reported that the inspiration for the storyline came during a tour of Litomyšl, Czech Republic in 1993. It was released on 18 April 2001 in the United States. It grossed $39.4 million worldwide and received negative reviews from critics who called it an unnecessary sequel.

== Plot ==
Thirteen years after the events from Crocodile Dundee II Michael "Crocodile" Dundee is living in the Australian outback with Sue Charlton and their young son Mikey. Crocodile hunting has been made illegal, and Mick is reduced to wrestling crocodiles for the entertainment of tourists. He has a rival in the business, another outback survivalist named Jacko. When an opportunity arises for Sue to become the Los Angeles bureau chief of a newspaper owned by her father, Mick and his family cross the Pacific to California.

In the United States, both Mick and his son have encounters with the locals, causing cross-cultural mishaps. Mick becomes an undercover amateur detective, helping to probe the mysterious death of his wife's predecessor at the newspaper, while Mikey attends a local school, where he quickly impresses his classmates and teacher with his outback survival skills. Because the case takes up so much of their time, Mick and Sue eventually call in Jacko to babysit their son; immediately, Jacko and Mikey's teacher become interested in each other.

It is revealed that the dead reporter had been investigating a film studio, which is about to make a sequel to the action film Lethal Agent, despite the title's commercial failure. Mick becomes suspicious when several paintings from Southern Europe are brought onto the set; although at first he suspects drug smuggling, the pictures themselves are revealed to be missing art from a museum in former Yugoslavia, thought lost in the recent civil wars. They are to appear in the film as mere props, to be publicly 'destroyed' in a scene in which they are set on fire, at which point they will have been exchanged for copies.

Attempting to secure one of the paintings as evidence, Mick, Sue, and Jacko run afoul of the studio director and his thugs. Using the studio's props and three lions used in filming to defeat the gangsters, Mick and Sue solve the case and return to Australia, where they are officially married.

== Cast ==
- Paul Hogan as Michael "Crocodile" Dundee
- Linda Kozlowski as Sue Charlton
- Jere Burns as Arnan Rothman
- Jonathan Banks as Miloš Drubnik
- Alec Wilson as Jacko
- Gerry Skilton as Nugget O'Cass
- Steve Rackman as Donk
- Serge Cockburn as Michael 'Mikey' Dundee II / Michael Charlton
- Aida Turturro as Jean Ferraro
- Paul Rodriguez as Diego
- Kaitlin Hopkins as Miss Mathis
- Slim de Grey as Minister
- Mike Tyson as Himself
- George Hamilton as Himself
- Betty Bobbitt as American Lady

== Production ==
Matthew Berry, Eric Abrams and Paul Hogan had a dispute over the script.

Unlike the other two films it is shot in 1.85:1 instead of 2.39:1. It is also the first film not to involve Rimfire Films. Paramount, the distributor of the other two films, distributed the film domestically with Universal Pictures handling a few other territories for the film. It is the first film in the series to not involve Hoyts. Various independent distributors handled the film in other territories. 20th Century Fox, the foreign distributor of the first film, distributed the film in Italy.

== Reception ==
=== Box office ===
The film grossed $7,759,103 at the box office in Australia. The film debuted in 4th place at the US box office behind Bridget Jones's Diary (which was #1 in its second weekend), Spy Kids and Along Came a Spider. It grossed $39 million worldwide, below the total gross of the previous two films. In a November 2017 interview, comedian Tom Green claimed that moviegoers under the age of 17 bought tickets to Crocodile Dundee in Los Angeles snuck in to the showing of his film Freddy Got Fingered, and that the box office receipts for that film did not reflect the actual attendance.

=== Critical response ===
On Rotten Tomatoes, the film has a score of 11% based on reviews from 80 critics. The site's consensus reads: "A sequel as unnecessary as it is belated, Crocodile Dundee in Los Angeles lacks virtually all of the easygoing humor and charm that delighted fans of the original". On Metacritic, the film has a score of 37% based on reviews from 33 critics, indicating generally unfavorable reviews. Audiences polled by CinemaScore gave the film an average grade of "B−" on an A+ to F scale.

Roger Ebert of the Chicago Sun-Times gave the film 2 out of 4 and wrote: "It may not be brilliant, but who would you rather your kids took as a role model: Crocodile Dundee, David Spade or Tom Green?", referring to the stars of contemporary theatrical releases Joe Dirt and Freddy Got Fingered, respectively. Variety called it "amiable rather than genuinely funny".

=== Accolades ===
The film was nominated for a Razzie Award for Worst Remake or Sequel but lost to Planet of the Apes.

== See also ==
- List of films featuring fictional films
