= Crocodile Dundee =

1986 film by Peter Faiman

- Australian theatrical release poster
- Directed by: Peter Faiman
- Screenplay by: Paul Hogan; Ken Shadie; John Cornell
- Story by: Paul Hogan
- Produced by: John Cornell
- Starring: Paul Hogan; Linda Kozlowski; Mark Blum; David Gulpilil; Michael Lombard; John Meillon
- Cinematography: Russell Boyd
- Edited by: David Stiven
- Music by: Peter Best
- Production company: Rimfire Films
- Distributed by: Hoyts Distribution (Australia); Paramount Pictures (United States and Canada); 20th Century Fox (International)
- Release dates: 24 April 1986 (Australia); 26 September 1986 (United States)
- Running time: 104 minutes (Australia); 98 minutes (International)
- Countries: Australia; United States
- Language: English
- Budget: A$8.8 million
- Box office: US$328 million

Crocodile Dundee is a 1986 romantic action-adventure comedy film directed by Peter Faiman and starring Paul Hogan as the namesake character and American actress Linda Kozlowski as reporter Sue Charlton. Inspired by the true-life exploits of Rod Ansell, the film was made on a budget of under $10 million as a deliberate attempt to make a commercial Australian film that would appeal to a mainstream American audience, but it proved to be a worldwide phenomenon.

Released on 30 April 1986 in Australia, and on 26 September in the United States, it was a critical and commercial success, grossing $328 million, being the highest-grossing film of all time in Australia, the highest-grossing Australian film worldwide, the second-highest-grossing film in the United States in 1986, the highest-grossing non-US film at the US box office ever, and the second-highest-grossing film worldwide for the year. The two versions of the film are the Australian version and an international version, which had much of the Australian slang replaced with more commonly understood terms and was slightly shorter. As the first installment in the Crocodile Dundee trilogy, it was followed by two sequels: Crocodile Dundee II (1988) and Crocodile Dundee in Los Angeles (2001), although both films failed to match the critical success of the original.

== Plot ==
Sue Charlton is a feature writer for her father's newspaper, Newsday, and is dating the editor, Richard Mason. She travels to Walkabout Creek, a small township in the Northern Territory of Australia, to meet Michael J. "Mick" or "Crocodile" Dundee, a bushman said to have lost half a leg to a saltwater crocodile before crawling 100 miles to safety. On arriving there, she meets Walter "Wally" Reilly, Mick's business partner, who assures Sue that Mick will be along soon. When Mick arrives that night, Sue observes that his leg is not missing, but he shows her a large scar he calls a "love bite". As Sue dances with Mick, a hunter from the city accuses him of being a poacher, and Mick responds by knocking him out with one punch.

At first, Sue is unimpressed by Mick's pleasant-mannered but uncouth behaviour, and his clumsy advances towards her. Mick admits he was once in a relationship with a woman, but she left him when he went on walkabout for 18 months. Sue is amazed, when once in the Outback, she witnesses Mick subduing a water buffalo, killing a snake with his bare hands, scaring away a band of drunken kangaroo hunters by tricking them into thinking one of the kangaroos is shooting back, and taking part in an Aboriginal (Pitjantjatjara) tribal dance ceremony.

After the first night, offended by Mick's assertion that as a "sheila", she would be incapable of surviving in the Outback on her own, Sue goes out alone to prove him wrong, although at his request, she takes his rifle with her. Mick secretly follows her to make sure she stays safe; when she stops at a billabong to fill her canteen, she is attacked by a crocodile and rescued by Mick. Overcome with gratitude, Sue finds herself becoming attracted to him.

Sue invites Mick to return with her to New York City on the pretext of wrapping up the story. At first, Wally scoffs at her suggestion, but he changes his mind when she tells him the newspaper would pay.

In New York, Mick is perplexed by local behaviour and customs, but he uses his survival skills, ability to improvise, and innate common sense to good-naturedly overcome problematic or even dangerous situations, including a disagreement with a pimp and an attempted mugging.

Sue resumes her relationship with Richard. She chastises Mick for punching Richard in an Italian restaurant after Richard had repeatedly made insulting wisecracks about Mick's unsophisticated lifestyle. Sue finds herself increasingly torn between Richard and her affection for Mick. At a dinner in her father's home in honour of Sue's safe return, to which Mick has been invited, Richard proposes marriage to Sue, and her confused nonresponse is taken by Richard and the other dinner guests, including Mick, as acceptance.

Disheartened at Sue's engagement, Mick decides he has had enough of New York City, and as he leaves his hotel, he tells Irving, the doorman, that he is going on walkabout around the United States. Shortly after Mick leaves, Sue arrives, and Irving tells her Mick is headed for the nearest subway stop. Sue kicks her shoes off and runs barefoot after Mick. When she arrives at the subway station, she cannot reach him through the crowd on the platform, but has members of the crowd relay her message to him; she is not going to marry Richard because she loves Mick. Hearing her message, Mick walks to Sue on the heads and raised hands of the onlookers and embraces her to the applause of the crowd.

== Cast ==
- Paul Hogan as Michael J. "Crocodile" Dundee
- Linda Kozlowski as Susan Charlton
- John Meillon as Walter Reilly
- David Gulpilil as Neville "Nev" Bell
- Mark Blum as Richard Mason
- Michael Lombard as Sam Charlton
- Reginald VelJohnson as Gus
- Terry Gill as Duffy
- Steve Rackman as Donk
- Gerry Skilton as Nugget
- David Bracks as Burt (Roo Shooter)
- Peter Turnbull as Trevor
- Rik Colitti as Danny
- Christine Totos as Rosita
- Graham 'Grace' Walker as Angelo
- Caitlin Clarke as Simone
- Nancy Mette as Karla
- John Snyder as Pimp
- Anne Carlisle as Gwendoline
- Anne Francine as Fran
- Paige Matthews as Party Girl
- Paul Greco as New Yorker
- Sullivan Walker as Tall Man
- Ritchie Singer as Con
- Burt as the saltwater crocodile

== Production ==
The idea to make the film came to Paul Hogan (the lead actor and one of the story writers) when he was in New York. He wondered what it would be like if a Northern Territory bushman arrived in town. As Paul Hogan said:

There's a lot about Dundee that we all think we're like; but we're not, because we live in Sydney. He's a mythical outback Australian who does exist in part—the frontiersman who walks through the bush, picking up snakes and throwing them aside, living off the land, who can ride horses and chop down trees and has that simple, friendly, laid-back philosophy. It's like the image the Americans have of us, so why not give them one? ... We've always been desperately short of folk heroes in this country. Ned Kelly is pathetic. So are the bushrangers.

The film's budget was raised through the 10BA tax concessions via Morgan Sharebrokers. Paul Hogan used his regular collaborators from TV, including John Cornell, Peter Faiman, and Ken Shadie. Linda Kozlowski was imported to play the American reporter; Actors' Equity Australia objected to this, but eventually relented.

Principal photography began on 13 July 1985. The first scenes were filmed in the small town of McKinlay in Queensland, where the hotel used has original warped and polished hardwood floors. Production decided to shoot in Kakadu National Park at the end of the dry season, since crocodiles were less active in the filming locations. Areas such as Gunlom Falls, also known as the UDP Falls back in the 1980s, are also featured in the movie. The crocodile-attack scene was filmed in Girraween Lagoon, just out of Darwin. Six weeks of filming were spent working out of Jaja, an abandoned uranium-mining camp in Kakadu National Park in the Northern Territory, with an additional week in Cloncurry. A further six weeks of filming were in New York City (including Newark Liberty International Airport, one of the airports serving the city). Filming wrapped on 11 October 1985.

When the filming finished, Hogan said he expected it would make millions of dollars around the world. Hogan also said of the film: "I'm planning for it to be Australia's first proper movie. I don't think we've had one yet—not a real, general public, successful, entertaining movie". Crocodile Dundee was offered to 20th Century Fox and Warner Bros. for North American release before Paramount picked it up for US$6 million.

== Release ==
=== Theatrical ===
The film was originally released on 30 April 1986 in Australia and on 26 September 1986 in the United States.

=== Home media ===
The film was released on VHS in the United Kingdom by CBS Fox Video on 24 September 1987 and sold a record 62,000 copies, generating a gross profit of £2.7 million (US$4.3 million). DVD 2001 and Bluray 2021

=== Television broadcasts ===
Crocodile Dundee remains the single most-viewed Christmas Day film or program in the United Kingdom when it debuted on 25 December 1989 on BBC One, with an audience of 21.8 million.

=== The Encore Cut ===
In January 2025, a version of the film subtitled The Encore Cut premiered in Sydney, ahead of a wider theatrical release in May. Along with a 4K remaster, the film received a number of edits, including the inclusion of a text land acknowledgement at the top of the film, extended scenes in Kakadu, and the removal of scenes that could be considered transphobic and homophobic. Production company Rimfire Films stated that the edits to the film were made at the request of Paramount Pictures. The Encore Cut will become the standard version for future releases.

Hogan defended The Encore Cut, arguing, "[I]t wasn't about being woke...it's better without [those scenes]". Faiman possessed a mixed response, arguing that while re-edits to films are not unprecedented, "I think that screwing around with history, in the arts particularly, is not a good idea." The Encore Cut received criticism from some fans and media outlets, including The Sydney Morning Herald and Seven News.

== Reception ==
=== Box office ===
The film was a hit, grossing US$328 million and surpassing Mad Max 2 as the highest-grossing Australian film at the worldwide box office.

Crocodile Dundee opened with a record A$2,047,026 in its first week in Australia. It went on to gross A$47,707,045 at the box office in Australia and was the highest-grossing film of all time there after 11 weeks, surpassing E.T. The Extra-Terrestrial. It was also the highest-grossing film of all time in New Zealand, with a gross of $5.1 million.

A number of minor changes were made to the film for its US release, where it was released theatrically by Paramount Pictures in September 1986. The film debuted at number one, grossing US$8 million in its opening weekend, and it remained at number one for nine weeks. It grossed US$174,803,506 at the U.S. and Canadian box office, being the second-highest-grossing film that year for both the studio and at the United States box office. Box Office Mojo estimates that the film sold over 46 million tickets in North America. The film was the highest-grossing, non-American film at the US box office.

It opened in London and Dublin on 12 December 1986 and was the highest-grossing film to open at only one cinema in the West End of London, where it grossed £163,990 in its first week at the Leicester Square Theatre, beating the house record. Similar to its performance in Australia, by its third week of release, the film had broken its own record, increasing its gross at the Leicester Square Theatre to £173,053 for the week. Its three-week gross of £463,460 was the biggest ever for a cinema in the UK at the time. It opened nationwide in the UK on 9 January 1987, where it became number one nationally and stayed for eight weeks to become one of the highest-grossing films of all time with a gross of £20 million. It was the highest-grossing film of all time in Ireland, with a gross of $2.8 million.

=== Critical response ===
On Rotten Tomatoes, the film holds an approval rating of 87%, based on 138 reviews, and an average rating of 6.9/10. The critics' consensus reads: "Infectiously easygoing charm and a leading man in the role he was born to play help Crocodile Dundee make the most of its familiar fish-out-of-water premise". On Metacritic the film has a score of 62 out of 100 based on reviews from 13 critics, indicating "generally favorable" reviews. Audiences polled by CinemaScore gave the film an average rating of "B+" on an A+ to F scale.

Roger Ebert gave the film 2 stars out of 4 and wrote: "All of the cliches are in the right places, most of the gags pay off and there are moments of real amusement as the Australian cowboy wanders around Manhattan as a naive sightseer. The problem is that there's not one moment of chemistry between the two stars: Paul Hogan as 'Crocodile' Dundee and Linda Kozlowski as the clever little rich girl. The movie feels curiously machine-made, as if they had all the right ingredients and simply forgot to add the animal magnetism". Nina Darnton of The New York Times thought that Paul Hogan was "delightful" in the title role, that the screenplay was "witty, with a fine sense of irony and the gift at poking fun at its own conceits", and that "Linda Kozlowski plays the reporter, Sue, very well", virtues which "go a long way toward compensating for the film's illogical plot and set-up situations". Variety stated that director Peter Faiman "has problems with the pacing and a script (by Hogan and longtime TV colleague Ken Shadie) that has its flat, dull spots. Hogan is comfortable enough playing the wry, irreverent, amiable Aussie that seems close to his own persona, and teams well with Kozlowski, who radiates lots of charm, style and spunk". Dave Kehr of the Chicago Tribune gave the film 3 stars out of 4 and wrote: "Handsomely directed by Peter Faiman, the film punches most of the right buttons at most of the right times and emerges as an effective crowd-pleaser". Paul Attanasio of The Washington Post said that the film "has a double 'fish out of water' structure—first she's the fish, then he's the fish—but the movie doesn't go anywhere with it, mostly because the characters are such nullities ... There's no drama in 'Crocodile Dundee' because there's no real conflict between these characters". Michael Wilmington of the Los Angeles Times wrote that the film "is nothing you can examine deeply or mull over afterward. It's simply an expert crowd-pleaser. It has such a sure, easy, confident touch that it's almost failure-proof—like a tip of the hat, a sip of beer, a quick, golden 'G'day'". Monthly Film Bulletin called it "as dull and lumbering as its hero".

Although Crocodile Dundee was a hit both in Australia and abroad, it became controversial with some Australian critics and audiences who resented the image of Australians as being ocker. Robert Hughes complained in 2000 that to Americans "Crocodile Dundee is a work of social realism", giving them a "'Wild West' fantasy" about Australia. In 2018, businessman David Droga said, "[T]here has been no better ad for Australia than that movie".

=== Accolades ===
Award	Category	Subject	Result
Academy Awards	Best Original Screenplay	John Cornell, Ken Shadie, and Paul Hogan	Nominated
BAFTA Awards	Best Original Screenplay	John Cornell, Ken Shadie, and Paul Hogan	Nominated
BAFTA Awards	Best Actor	Paul Hogan	Nominated
Golden Globe Awards	Best Actor – Motion Picture Musical or Comedy	Paul Hogan	Won
Golden Globe Awards	Best Supporting Actress – Motion Picture	Linda Kozlowski	Nominated
Golden Globe Awards	Best Motion Picture – Musical or Comedy	John Cornell	Nominated
Saturn Awards	Best Fantasy Film	John Cornell	Nominated
Saturn Awards	Best Writing	John Cornell, Ken Shadie, and Paul Hogan	Nominated
BMI Film & TV Award	Best Music	Peter Best	Won
Golden Screen	Best Sold Tickets		Won
MPSE Awards	Best Sound Editing – Foreign Feature	Tim Chau	Nominated

== Sequels ==
The film became the first in the Crocodile Dundee series, with two sequels and a Super Bowl commercial. The sequel titled Crocodile Dundee II was released in 1988, and the third film titled Crocodile Dundee in Los Angeles was released in 2001.
