= John Cornell =

Australian film producer and businessman (1941–2021)

- Born: 2 March 1941; Kalgoorlie, Western Australia, Australia
- Died: 23 July 2021 (aged 80); Byron Bay, New South Wales, Australia
- Occupations: Film producer; film director; writer; actor; businessman
- Spouse: Delvene Delaney (m. 1977)
- Children: 3

John Cornell (2 March 1941 – 23 July 2021) was an Australian actor, director, producer, writer, and businessman. He was best known for his role as "Strop" on The Paul Hogan Show, and he was instrumental in the introduction of World Series Cricket in 1977.

== Early life ==
Cornell was born in Kalgoorlie, Western Australia, on 2 March 1941. He was raised in Bunbury. He stated that he was considered a "ratbag" (Note: "Ratbag" is an Australian slang term for a non-conformist, a mischievous troublemaker, a scoundrel, a rascal or a lovable scallywag. The term can be used in a non-offensive way (as is the case in this article), or it may be used more pejoratively, as someone thoroughly disapproved of: a villain, a crook, a disreputable person.) at school, but he topped the class in both English and Economics at Bunbury High. Although he contemplated a career in pharmacy, it was his interest in journalism that saw him gain a cadetship at the Daily News in Perth.

== Career ==
As a journalist, Cornell reported on local events in Perth for The Daily News (a publication of West Australian Newspapers), becoming editor of that paper at 26 years of age.

In 1971, while working as a producer for the television show A Current Affair, Cornell recognised the talents of a Sydney Harbour Bridge rigger, Paul Hogan (who had been the subject of an interview by the station). Cornell became Hogan's manager and often appeared alongside him in his popular television show, The Paul Hogan Show, as a character called "Strop" (a dim-witted dinkum Australian surf lifesaver). He produced and co-wrote the screenplay for Hogan's 1986 film Crocodile Dundee which became the highest grossing Australian film. He also produced and directed the successful 1988 sequel, Crocodile Dundee II.

Cornell worked closely with Kerry Packer and Austin Robertson in setting up World Series Cricket (WSC) in 1977. Based on a suggestion in 1976 by Dennis Lillee (whom Cornell was managing at the time), Cornell presented the idea to Kerry Packer—primarily with the aim of providing better financial rewards to the players. Cornell was actively involved in the recruitment of players for WSC, for example travelling to New Zealand to sign players (including Doug Walters). Cornell engaged the Mojo agency to produce radio and television advertisements to promote WSC—including the production of the jingle "C'mon Aussie C'mon".

== Personal life ==
Cornell married Australian actress and television personality Delvene Delaney in 1977, and they had two children: Allira and Liana. He was married twice before, and had a daughter from one of those marriages (Melissa, born in 1970).

== Finances ==
Cornell built the Byron Beach Hotel (Byron Bay) for $9 million in 1990. In 2007, it was sold by Cornell to a consortium of businessmen led by Max Twigg (a Melbourne businessman and racing car driver), with varying reports on the sale price, e.g. either $44 million or a record $65 million. In 2017, Max Twigg later resold the property to the Liberman family–backed Impact Investment Group (IIG), a Melbourne-based firm that is a joint venture between the Liberman and van Haandel families, in an off-market deal brokered by CBRE Hotels's Wayne Bunz and Daniel Dragicevich for $70 million (below the initial $75–$80 million sales price ancipated in July 2016). Dragicevich stated that “There are very few landmark beachside freehold hotels like this in Australia, both in terms of scale and location." In November 2019, the Byron Beach Hotel was sold for a record $100 million to Moelis Australia Hotel Management. It was described at the time by the buyer (Dan Brady, CEO of Moelis Australia Hotel Management) as an "Iconic Australian establishment located on irreplaceable real estate". The hotel is known as "Top Pub" to locals. Melbourne restaurateurs and hospitality figures John and Lisa van Haandel have operated the hotel since 2007, with John van Handel still holding the original 10-year lease (ending mid-2017), which had two additional 10-year options.

Cornell and Paul Hogan were investigated for alleged tax evasion as part of the Australian Taxation Office's (ATO) Project Wickenby, which commenced in 2004. They were also investigated by the Australian Crime Commission "over the use of offshore accounts to bank royalties from the Crocodile Dundee films" (with both denying any dishonest conduct). They were later cleared of any wrongdoing by the Australian Crime Commission (ACC). In 2012, Hogan and Cornell confirmed that they had settled the eight-year dispute with the ATO.

== Death ==
Cornell suffered from Parkinson's disease and had undergone deep brain stimulation to alleviate the symptoms. The disease had rendered Cornell largely immobile; however, treatment by Peter Silburn at St Andrew's War Memorial Hospital in Brisbane enabled him to "enjoy 2 km walks with his wife".

Cornell died on 23 July 2021 at his home at Byron Bay. He was 80. His death was due to complications related to Parkinson's disease.

== Filmography ==
Cornell was involved in various roles in the following projects:

- Almost an Angel (1990) – producer, director
- Crocodile Dundee II (1988) – producer, director
- Crocodile Dundee (1986) – producer, writer
- Hogan in London (1975) – producer, actor, writer
- The Paul Hogan Show (1973 to 1984) – producer, actor, writer

== Awards and nominations ==
Year	Award	Category	Work	Subject	Result	Ref.
1987	Academy Awards	Best Original Screenplay	Crocodile Dundee	Nominated	John Cornell, Ken Shadie, and Paul Hogan	

== Bibliography ==
- Lillee, Dennis (2003). Lillee: An Autobiography (1st ed.). London: Headline. ISBN 0-7553-1231-7.
