= Paul Hogan =

Australian actor and comedian (born 1939)

Paul Hogan AM
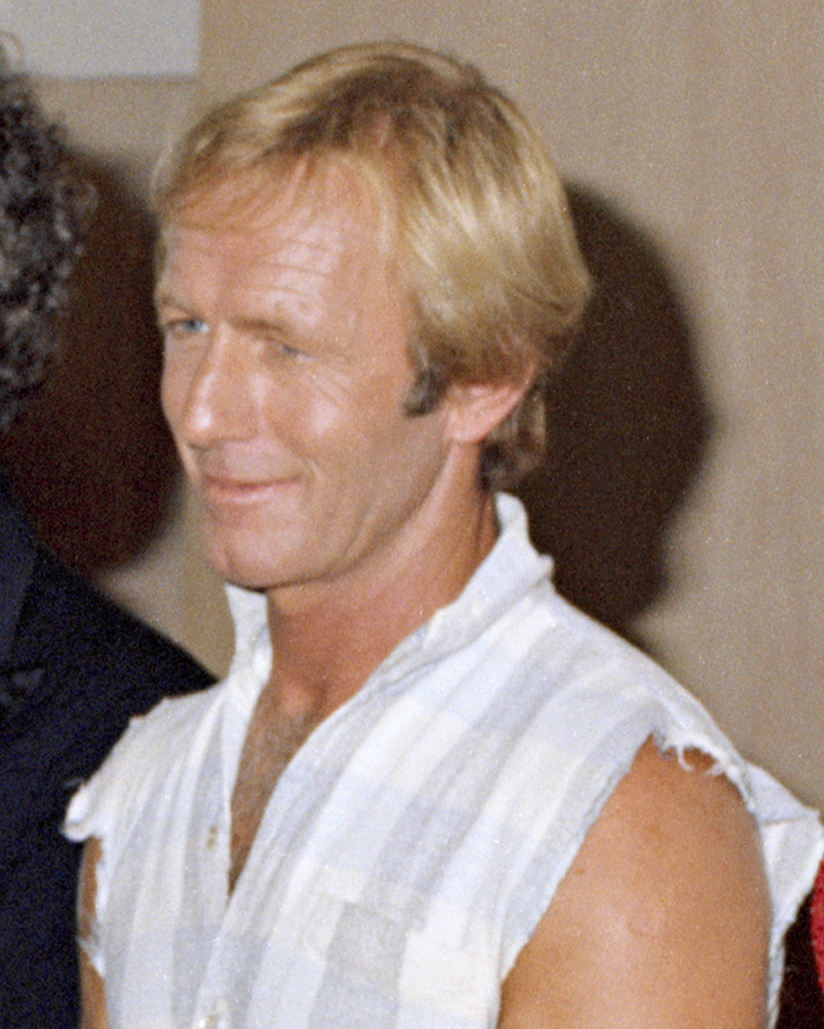
- Hogan at the Royal Charity Concert in 1980
- Born: 8 October 1939 (age 87); Parramatta, New South Wales, Australia
- Occupations: Actor; comedian; producer; writer
- Years active: 1971–present
- Spouses: Noelene Edwards (m. 1958; div. 1981) (m. 1982; div. 1989) Linda Kozlowski (m. 1990; div. 2014)
- Children: 6

Paul Hogan AM (born 8 October 1939) is an Australian actor and comedian. He was nominated for the Academy Award for Best Original Screenplay and won the Golden Globe Award for Best Actor – Motion Picture Musical or Comedy for his performance as outback adventurer Michael "Crocodile" Dundee in Crocodile Dundee (1986), the first in the Crocodile Dundee film series.

== Early life ==
At the start of his career, Paul Hogan said he was born in Lightning Ridge, New South Wales, to appear more interesting. He was actually born in Parramatta, a suburb in Greater Western Sydney. Hogan is of Irish descent.

Hogan moved to Granville in Western Sydney at a young age and worked as a rigger on the Sydney Harbour Bridge. He attended both Primary and High School at Parramatta Marist High School.

== Career ==
Hogan's first public appearance was on Australian television, the Nine Network's amateur talent program New Faces in 1971. Hogan had observed to his Harbour Bridge workmates that the program's entertainment value relied significantly on the judges ridiculing and belittling the performers, and suggested the judges deserved similar treatment. Hogan inveigled his way onto the program by claiming to be a "tap-dancing knife-thrower". Hogan appeared on stage in his work boots, holding elaborate prop "knives", and proceeded to make a series of jokes at the judges' expense; he finished by performing a rudimentary shuffle and throwing the knives onto the floor. Strong positive response from the viewing public saw Hogan invited back for repeated performances on New Faces; in another of these, he proposed to "play the shovels", which consisted of making a series of jokes before banging two shovels together a few times. Hogan's natural ability as a comedic performer attracted the attention of Mike Willesee, host of Nine's news magazine program A Current Affair. Willesee offered Hogan regular appearances on the series, during which Hogan would make humorous comment on some issue of the day. During this time, Hogan befriended A Current Affair producer John Cornell, who became Hogan's manager and business partner.

Hogan followed this with his own comedy sketch program The Paul Hogan Show, which he produced and wrote, and in which he played characters with Cornell, Delvene Delaney and Lynda Stoner. The series, which ran for 60 episodes between 1973 and 1984, was popular in the UK, where it aired on the new Channel Four from 1982 and also in South Africa, and showcased his trademark light-hearted but laddish ocker humour. Hogan won the 1973 TV Week Logie Award for 'Best New Talent'. The early series was on Channel Seven and, by 1975, it was screened on Channel Nine where it remained until the end of 1984.

In the 1970s, Hogan advertised Winfield cigarettes in television, print and billboard advertisements in which he wore a formal dinner suit. These ads always ended with the catchphrase "Anyhow, have a Winfield." During the early 1980s, Hogan filmed a series of television ads promoting the Australian tourism industry, which aired in the United States. An advertisement with the phrase "shrimp on the barbie", which aired from 1984, was particularly successful.

In 1985, Hogan appeared as an Australian World War I 'digger' named Pat Cleary in the miniseries Anzacs, which aired on the Nine Network. Cleary was described as the quintessential Aussie larrikin, and series writer John Dixon wrote the part of Cleary with Hogan in mind. The series included a "who's who" of Australian television and film actors of the day, including Jon Blake, Andrew Clarke, Megan Williams, Tony Bonner, Bill Kerr, Ilona Rodgers, Vivean Gray and Robert Coleby.

Throughout the decade, Hogan appeared on British television in advertisements for Foster's Lager, in which he played an earthy Australian abroad in London. The character's most notable line (spoken incredulously at a ballet performance) "Strewth, there's a bloke down there with no strides on!", followed Hogan for years, and the popularity of its "fish out of water" humour was repeated with his next endeavour. In another advertisement from the same Foster's series, Hogan's character is approached in a London Tube station by a Japanese tourist who asks, "Do you know the way to Cockfosters?" (referring to an area in North London), to which Hogan replies (with a puzzled look on his face): "Drink it warm, mate."

Hogan's breakout role was that of Mick "Crocodile" Dundee in the film Crocodile Dundee (1986). Hogan also co-wrote the movie, which was a massive critical and commercial success in many countries. He won the 1987 Golden Globe Award for Best Actor – Motion Picture Musical or Comedy and was also nominated for Best Actor at the BAFTAs. The screenplay was nominated for an Academy Award, a BAFTA and a Saturn Award. Along with Chevy Chase and Goldie Hawn, Hogan co-hosted the 59th Academy Awards, also in 1987. Hogan again portrayed Mick Dundee in the sequel Crocodile Dundee II, released in 1988. Hogan was also executive producer and co-writer with his son, Brett. Although less popular with critics than the first Crocodile Dundee, it was still a commercial success. The character made him popular in the United States, with phrases like, "That's not a knife... that's a knife!" entering the lexicon, though Hogan was troubled that the character was perceived as a cross between Chuck Norris and John Rambo, and turned down roles similar to those because of their violent nature, commenting:

"The movie scene is screaming out for the movie hero who doesn't kill 75 people...less of those commandos, terminators, ex-terminators and squashers. Mick's a good role model. There's no malice in the fellow and he's human. He's not a wimp or a sissy just because he doesn't kill people."

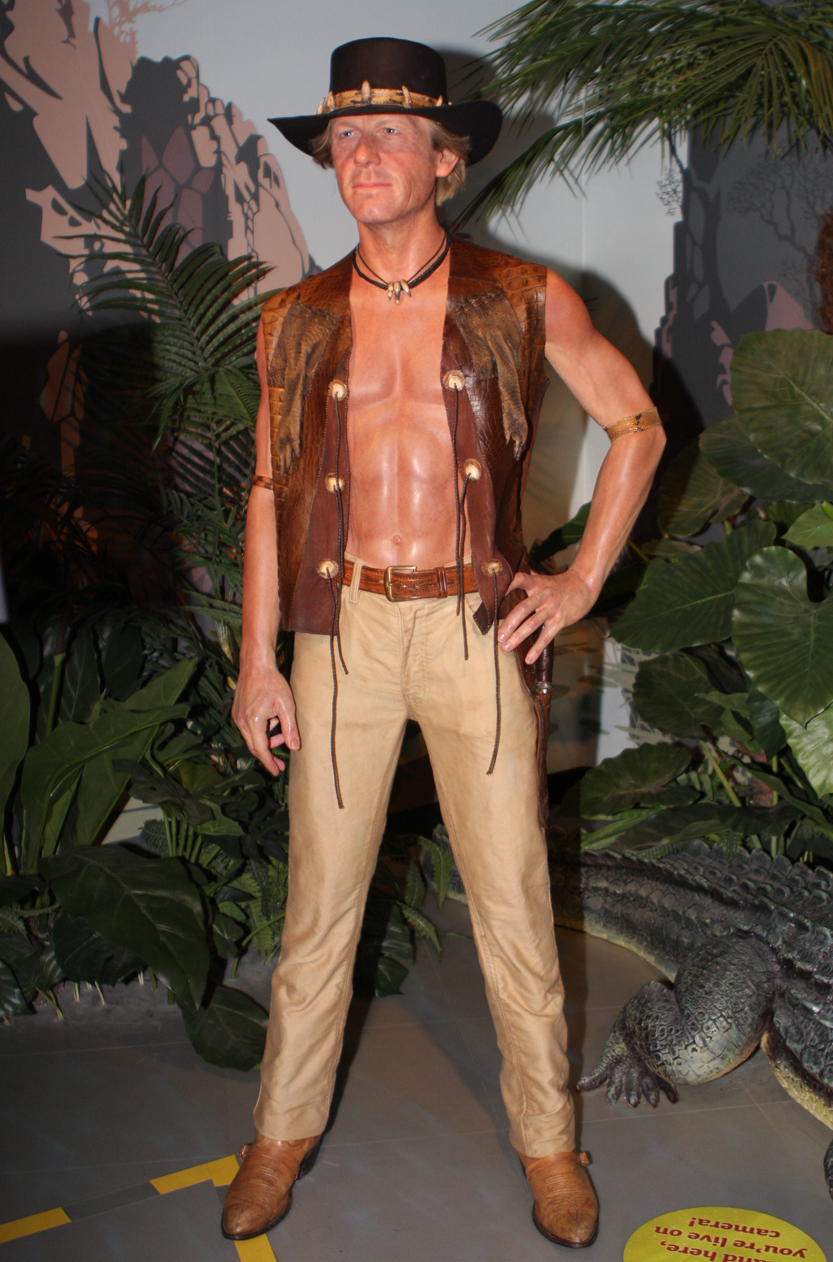
Wax figure of Hogan as Crocodile Dundee at Madame Tussauds Sydney

In the early 1990s, a Paramount executive pitched a concept of a Crocodile Dundee and Beverly Hills Cop crossover movie. Hogan refused the starring role in the hit film Ghost, choosing instead to make Almost an Angel (1990). In 1994, Hogan co-produced, wrote and starred in the Western comedy film Lightning Jack. In 1996, he starred in a remake of the 1963 film Flipper, a family-friendly movie about a dolphin. In 1998, he co-starred in the made-for-TV drama Floating Away, an adaptation of the Tim Sandlin book Sorrow Floats, and in which he played 'Shane', a recovering alcoholic.

In the late 1990s and early 2000s, Hogan was featured in advertisements for the Subaru Outback. In 2001, Hogan returned to the role that made him famous with Crocodile Dundee in Los Angeles.

In 2004, Hogan starred in the Australian-produced comedy film Strange Bedfellows, about two firemen pretending to be in a homosexual relationship for financial benefit. Strange Bedfellows was written and directed by Hogan's friend Dean Murphy and was the highest-grossing Australian-made film of 2004.

2005 saw the release of Paul Hogan – Stand Up Hoges, a DVD compilation of Hogan's favourite live performances throughout his career.

In 2009, Hogan starred in another of Murphy's films, Charlie & Boots, a road-movie concerning the relationship between a father (Hogan) and son (Shane Jacobson). It was the second-highest-grossing Australian-made film of 2009, after Mao's Last Dancer.

In 2013, 2014 and 2015, Hogan embarked on live stand-up performances throughout Australia. The 2013 tour entitled An Evening with Hoges featured capital cities only, but the 2014 tour Hoges: One Night Only featured 25 locations including regional Australia. 2015's Hoges: Live saw performances in Hobart, Melbourne and Sydney only. Some of this material was shown in the 2014 documentary Hanging with Hoges, in which Hogan was interviewed about his life and career by Jacobson.

In 2016, Hogan received the Longford Lyell Award for an outstanding contribution to the Australian screen. Hogan joked he had only ever been a "one-hit wonder".

Australia's Seven Network commissioned a two-part miniseries based upon Hogan's life, entitled Hoges: The Paul Hogan Story which aired in February 2017. Australian actor Josh Lawson portrayed Hogan. In 2019, to celebrate Hogan's upcoming 80th birthday, Australia's ABC produced a two-part episode of Australian Story, entitled "A Fortunate Life – Paul Hogan", in which Hogan and his family reflect on his life and career.

Following on from a 2018 Tourism Australia campaign, in 2020 Hogan starred in The Very Excellent Mr. Dundee, with Hogan portraying himself as an aging, out-of-touch movie actor with his legendary character Mick Dundee now monetised and manipulated by others.

In 2022, Hogan took part in a live TV roast entitled The Roast of Paul Hogan.

== Honours ==
- In 1985, Hogan was named Australian of the Year.
- In 1986, he was appointed a Member of the Order of Australia (AM) "for service to tourism and entertainment".
- In 1987, Hogan won a Golden Globe Award for Best Actor – Musical or Comedy for Crocodile Dundee.
- In 2016, Hogan received the Longford Lyell Award, the highest honour of the Australian Academy of Cinema and Television Arts (AACTA), for outstanding services to the Australian screen.

=== Logie Awards ===
The Logie Awards is an annual gathering to celebrate Australian television, sponsored and organised by magazine TV Week, with the first ceremony in 1959, known then as the TV Week Awards, the awards are presented in 20 categories representing both public and industry voted awards.

| Year | Nominee / work | Award | Result |
|---|---|---|---|
| 1973 | himself | George Wallace Memorial Logie for Best New Talent | Won |

=== Mo Awards ===
The Australian Entertainment Mo Awards (commonly known informally as the Mo Awards), were annual Australian entertainment industry awards. They recognise achievements in live entertainment in Australia from 1975 to 2016.

| Year | Nominee / work | Award | Result (wins only) |
|---|---|---|---|
| 1988 | Paul Hogan | Australian Showbusiness Ambassador | Won |

== Personal life ==
Hogan and his first wife, Noelene (née Edwards), married in 1958. They separated and divorced in 1981 and remarried less than one year later. A second divorce, initiated in 1986, was considered one of Australia's ugliest celebrity divorces. Hogan married his Crocodile Dundee co-star Linda Kozlowski in 1990. He had five children with Noelene (sons Brett, Clay, Scott, and Todd and daughter Lauren) and one son with Kozlowski (Chance). In October 2013, Kozlowski filed for divorce from Hogan, citing irreconcilable differences, with the divorce finalised in 2014.

Todd Hogan is the father of television presenter Mylee Hogan and her brother Jake Hogan.

=== Tax problems ===
From February 2003 until all charges were dropped in November 2010, Hogan faced a series of legal issues while under investigation by the Australian Taxation Office (ATO) for tax evasion.

His legal troubles were made public in 2007 when Hogan was named as one of a group in connection to an AU$300 million Australian tax fraud investigation called Operation Wickenby, investigating 23 companies for allegedly using overseas companies to hide income. In July 2008, Hogan commented to Network Ten that he had "paid plenty of tax" in Australia and that he had nothing to fear from the ATO investigation.

In October 2008, Hogan scored a major victory in his tax fight with the Australian Crime Commission, who were forced to pay up to an estimated AU$5 million for legal bills dating back to 2006 and were required to return seized personal financial documents that they had admitted were irrelevant. Hogan had not been charged in connection with the investigation, which began in 2003.

On 18 June 2010, in the Australian High Court, Hogan lost a long-running legal battle to keep the contents of his tax documents secret, paving the way for details of his offshore accounts to be published. Earlier the same year, Australian media reported that the Australian Crime Commission was in the final stages of preparing to lay criminal charges of tax evasion against Hogan, film producer John Cornell and their accountant Anthony Stewart, who it suspected channelled millions of dollars from the proceeds of the film Crocodile Dundee and other films into offshore tax havens. The release of the documents was expected to help finalise the Tax Office's case.

On 20 August 2010, Hogan returned to Australia to attend his mother's funeral. Upon arrival, he was issued a Departure Prohibition Order by the ATO, which prevented him from leaving the country until his alleged tax debt was paid or settled. The nation's tax office said he owed taxes on AU$37.5 million of undeclared income. On 3 September, Hogan was granted permission to return to the U.S. through an agreement between his lawyers and Australian tax officials. Hogan continued to deny any wrongdoing.

In November 2010, the Australian Tax Office dropped its criminal investigation of Hogan and his business manager for tax evasion.

In January 2011, Hogan's lawyer announced that Hogan was suing the Australian government, stating that Hogan's "earning potential and reputation has been decimated". Hogan likened the Australian Tax Office to the Taliban and referred to staff as "a-holes".

In May 2012, it was announced that, following mediation before an ex–High Court judge, the entities settled with the Commissioner of Taxation in an agreement "without admission". The parties agreed that the terms of the settlement would remain confidential, but as part of the settlement, the Departure Prohibition Order was revoked by the Commissioner. As of April 2013, Hogan's financial advisor Stewart remained in a dispute with the Australian Tax Office.

Hogan reappeared in the media in April 2013, because of a AU$32.3 million issue with a Swiss bank run by the Geneva firm Strachans. Following the placement of the money in an offshore account for the purpose of tax avoidance, Hogan was unable to access the funds as of April 2013, and a United States court action by Hogan that sought AU$80 million in damages proved unsuccessful. Hogan publicly stated that he believes that Philip Egglishaw, the principal of Strachans and a former tax advisor to Hogan, had absconded with the money, and Hogan's American legal representative Schuyler "Sky" Moore filed corresponding documents in a Californian court based on this statement. On 18 April 2013, it was reported that Egglishaw denied the allegations of his former client.

In May 2017, Chris Jordan, Commissioner of Taxation, implied that in spite of Hogan's claim of victory over the ATO in 2012, Hogan paid "tens of millions of dollars" to settle the matter. In response, Hogan denied paying the ATO, and criticised Jordan for breaking the confidentiality clause of the 2012 agreement.

== Filmography ==
=== Acting ===
| Year | Title | Role | Notes |
|---|---|---|---|
| 1973–84 | The Paul Hogan Show | Playing different characters | TV series |
| 1985 | Anzacs | Lance Corporal Pat Cleary | Mini-series, also known as Anzacs: The War Down Under |
| 1986 | Crocodile Dundee | Michael J. 'Crocodile' Dundee | Golden Globe Award for Best Actor – Motion Picture Musical or Comedy; Nominated – BAFTA Award for Best Actor in a Leading Role |
| 1988 | Crocodile Dundee II | Michael J. 'Crocodile' Dundee | |
| 1990 | Almost an Angel | Terry Dean/Bonzo Burger Man | |
| 1994 | Lightning Jack | Lightning Jack Kane | |
| 1996 | Flipper | Porter | |
| 1998 | Floating Away | Shane | |
| 2001 | Crocodile Dundee in Los Angeles | Michael J. 'Crocodile' Dundee | |
| 2004 | Strange Bedfellows | Vince Hopgood | |
| 2009 | Charlie & Boots | Charlie | |
| 2018 | That's Not My Dog! | Himself | |
| 2020 | The Very Excellent Mr. Dundee | Himself | |

=== Writing ===
| Year | Title | Notes |
|---|---|---|
| 1973 | The Paul Hogan Show | TV series |
| 1975 | Hogan in London | TV |
| 1986 | Crocodile Dundee | Screenplay and story (with Ken Shadie and John Cornell); Nominated – Academy Award for Best Original Screenplay; Nominated – BAFTA Award for Best Original Screenplay; Nominated – Saturn Award for Best Writing |
| 1988 | Crocodile Dundee II | with Brett Hogan |
| 1990 | Almost an Angel | |
| 1994 | Lightning Jack | |

=== Producing ===
| Year | Title | Notes |
|---|---|---|
| 1988 | Crocodile Dundee II | Executive producer |
| 1990 | Almost an Angel | Executive producer |
| 1994 | Lightning Jack | Producer |
| 2001 | Crocodile Dundee in Los Angeles | Producer |

=== Himself ===
| Year | Title | Notes |
|---|---|---|
| 1971 | A Current Affair | TV series |
| 1973 | The Paul Hogan Show | TV series |
| 1975 | Hogan in London | TV |
| 1984 | Olympic Gala | TV |
| 1987 | 59th Academy Awards | Co-host |
| 1991 | Thank Ya, Thank Ya Kindly | TV |
| 2013 | Adam Hills Tonight | Guest |
| 2023 | The Roast of Paul Hogan | TV special |
