= List of highest-grossing films in Australia =

This list charts the most successful films at cinemas in Australia by box office sales in Australian dollars. An overview of the top-earning films and record-holders is provided, as well as the highest-grossing Australian productions.

== Highest-grossing films ==
The following is a list of the highest-grossing films in Australia. The list is topped by James Cameron's Avatar (2009) which surpassed his Titanic (1997) to take the local record. Crocodile Dundee (1986) is the highest-grossing Australian film with a gross of A$47.7 million.

Background colour indicates films currently running in cinemas.

Rank	Title	Year	Gross (A$)
1	Avatar	2009	118,985,016
2	Star Wars: The Force Awakens	2015	94,052,875
3	Avatar: The Way of Water	2022	93,762,270
4	Top Gun: Maverick	2022	93,536,383
5	Spider-Man: Brand New Day	2026	~90,000,000
6	Avengers: Endgame	2019	~88,800,000
7	Barbie	2023	86,456,455
8	Spider-Man: No Way Home	2021	81,786,111
9	The Odyssey	2026	~69,500,000
10	Deadpool & Wolverine	2024	67,827,771
11	The Lion King	2019	64,139,148
12	Avengers: Infinity War	2018	62,041,989
13	Avatar: Fire and Ash	2025	58,700,809
14	Star Wars: The Last Jedi	2017	58,098,045
15	Titanic	1997	57,713,717
16	A Minecraft Movie	2025	56,299,998
17	Inside Out 2	2024	55,535,593
18	Bohemian Rhapsody	2018	55,387,802
19	The Avengers	2012	53,489,620
20	Jurassic World	2015	52,966,857
21	Harry Potter and the Deathly Hallows: Part 2	2011	52,684,127
22	The Super Mario Bros. Movie	2023	51,771,089
23	Moana 2	2024	51,645,993
24	Rogue One: A Star Wars Story	2016	51,482,727
25	Shrek 2	2004	50,395,866
26	The Lord of the Rings: The Return of the King	2003	49,370,354
27	Skyfall	2012	49,025,604
28	Jumanji: Welcome to the Jungle	2017	48,851,308
29	Wicked: Part One	2024	48,740,438
30	Finding Dory	2016	48,623,796
31	Beauty and the Beast	2017	48,013,655
32*	Crocodile Dundee	1986	47,707,598
33	The Lord of the Rings: The Fellowship of the Ring	2001	47,429,619
34	Star Wars: The Rise of Skywalker	2019	47,336,904
35	Jumanji: The Next Level	2019	46,752,414
Films marked as * are classified as Australian Films by Screen Australia.

== Highest-grossing film by year ==
Year	Title	Gross (A$m)
1972	The Godfather	2.0^{R}
1973	Alvin Purple	4.7
1974	The Sting	4.4^{R}
1975	Jaws	4.8^{R}
1976	The Towering Inferno	3.9^{R}
1977	The Spy Who Loved Me	2.1^{R}
1978	Star Wars	6.4^{R}
1979	The Muppet Movie	2.0^{R}
1980	Kramer vs Kramer	3.1^{R}
1981	Gallipoli	4.1^{R}
1982	The Man from Snowy River	7.8^{R}
1983	E.T. the Extra-Terrestrial	11.4^{R}
1984	Indiana Jones and the Temple of Doom	4.2^{R}
1985	Beverly Hills Cop	4.1^{R}
1986	Crocodile Dundee	40.8
1987	Beverly Hills Cop II	11.4
1988	Crocodile Dundee II	24.9
1989	Indiana Jones and the Last Crusade	15.8
1990	Pretty Woman	26.1
1991	Dances with Wolves	19.2
1992	Strictly Ballroom	18.7
1993	Jurassic Park	31.7
1994	The Lion King	24.7
1995	Batman Forever	17.9
1996	Independence Day	29.3
1997	Men in Black	22.7
1998	Titanic	47.3
1999	Star Wars: Episode I – The Phantom Menace	38.7
2000	Gladiator	30.7
2001	Shrek	32.1
2002	Star Wars: Episode II – Attack of the Clones	33.8
2003	Finding Nemo	37.1
2004	Shrek 2	50.4
2005	Star Wars: Episode III – Revenge of the Sith	35.5
2006	Pirates of the Caribbean: Dead Man's Chest	38.1
2007	Harry Potter and the Order of the Phoenix	35.5
2008	The Dark Knight	45.8
2009	Harry Potter and the Half Blood Prince	40.6
2010	Avatar	75.3
2011	Harry Potter and the Deathly Hallows – Part 2	52.6
2012	The Avengers	53.3
2013	Iron Man 3	39.2
2014	The Hunger Games: Mockingjay - Part 1	32.8
2015	Star Wars: The Force Awakens	62.8
2016	Finding Dory	48.6
2017	Beauty and the Beast	48.0
2018	Avengers: Infinity War	61.9
2019	Avengers: Endgame	84.2
2020	Jumanji: The Next Level	28.0
2021	Spider-Man: No Way Home	55.3
2022	Top Gun: Maverick	93.1
2023	Barbie	86.2
2024	Deadpool & Wolverine	67.8
2025	A Minecraft Movie	56.3

^{R}Distributor rental for entire run

=== Previous record holders ===
Timeline of the highest-grossing film record
Year	Title	Record setting gross (A$)
1940	Gone With the Wind	3,426,000^{R}
1965	The Sound of Music	4,437,000^{R}
1975	Jaws	4,620,000^{R}
1977	Star Wars	6,200,000^{R}
1982	The Man from Snowy River	7,821,420^{R}
1983	E.T. the Extra-Terrestrial	11,424,768^{R}
1986	Crocodile Dundee	47,707,598 (19,772,232^{R})
1998	Titanic	57,713,717
2009	Avatar	115,781,489

^{R}Distributor rental.

== Highest-grossing Australian productions ==
The following is a list of the highest-grossing Australian films at the Australian box office. Crocodile Dundee has remained the highest-grossing Australian film for 40 years, regardless of inflation.

Rank	Title	Year of release	Budget (A$)	Australian gross (A$)	Worldwide gross (US$)
1	Crocodile Dundee	1986	$11,500,000	$47,707,598	$328,203,506
2	Australia	2008	$200,000,000 (US$130,000,000, US$78,000,000 after tax incentives)	$37,555,757	$211,342,221
3	Babe	1995	$30,000,000	$36,797,861	$254,134,910
4	Elvis	2022	$120,000,000	$33,613,464	$285,781,077
5	Happy Feet	2006	$132,740,000	$31,786,593	$384,335,608
6	The Lego Movie*	2014	$60,000,000	$29,834,461	$468,060,692
7	Lion	2016	$15,000,000	$29,568,232	$140,312,928
8	Moulin Rouge!	2001	$52,000,000	$27,765,415	$179,213,434
9	The Great Gatsby	2013	$105,000,000	$27,395,350	$353,641,895
10	Peter Rabbit	2018	$50,000,000	$26,795,589	$351,266,433
Films marked as * are not classified as Australian by Screen Australia

=== Previous Australian record holders ===
Timeline of the highest-grossing Australian film record
Year	Title	Record setting gross (A$)
1966	They're a Weird Mob	2,417,000
1973	Alvin Purple	4,720,000
1975	Picnic at Hanging Rock	5,120,000
1979	Mad Max	5,355,490
1981	Gallipoli	11,740,000
1982	The Man from Snowy River	17,228,160
1986	Crocodile Dundee	47,707,598

== Other popular Australian films ==
High grossing Australian films from earlier decades include:

- 1900s – The Story of the Kelly Gang (1906) (gross £20,000)
- 1910s – The Fatal Wedding (1911) (£18,000), The Life Story of John Lee, or The Man They Could Not Hang (1912) (£20,000), The Martyrdom of Nurse Cavell (1915) (£25,000)
- 1920s – For the Term of His Natural Life (1927) (over £40,000)
- 1930s – On Our Selection (1932) (£60,000), The Silence of Dean Maitland (1934) (£50,000)
- 1940s – Forty Thousand Horsemen (1940) (£130,000), Smithy (1946) (over £50,000), The Overlanders (1946) (£250,000), Sons of Matthew (1949)
- 1950s – Walk Into Paradise (1956)

== See also ==
- Lists of highest-grossing films
