= List of Australian films of the 2020s =

This is a list of Australian films during the 2020s decade: from 2020 to 2029. For a complete alphabetical list, see Category:Australian films.

== 2020 ==
- List of Australian films of 2020

== 2021 ==
- List of Australian films of 2021

== 2022 ==
- List of Australian films of 2022

== 2023 ==
- List of Australian films of 2023

== 2024 ==
- List of Australian films of 2024

== 2025 ==
- List of Australian films of 2025

== 2026 ==
- List of Australian films of 2026

== 2027 ==
- List of Australian films of 2027

== 2028 ==
- List of Australian films of 2028

== 2029 ==
- List of Australian films of 2029
