= List of Australian films of 2025 =

The following is a list of Australian films that have been released in 2025.

== Films ==
Opening		Title	Director	Cast	Genre	Ref
J A N U A R Y	16	Magic Beach	Robert Connolly	Spencer Ellis Anderson, Rylee Chuck, Elliott Hayes, Azania Molefi, Summer Jeon, Frankie Pollard, Monty Newton Welsh, Flynn Wandin	Children's, anthology	
F E B R U A R Y	27	Hindi Vindi	Ali Sayed	Mihir Ahuja, Neena Gupta, Guy Sebastian, Rupanty Akid, Mathew Swift, Bhakti Kubavat, Tal Davida, Cooper Alexis, Pranam Janney, Kym Jackson	Drama	
F E B R U A R Y	27	Inside	Charles Williams	Guy Pearce, Cosmo Jarvis, Vincent Miller, Tammy Macintosh, Toby Wallace	Drama	
F E B R U A R Y	27	The Lost Tiger	Chantelle Murray	Thomas Weatherall, Rhys Darby, Celeste Barber, Jimi Bani, Nakkiah Lui	Children's	
M A R C H	6	Spit	Jonathan Teplitzky	David Wenham, Helen Thomson, David Field, David Roberts, Gary Sweet, Arlo Green, Pallavi Sharda, Ayik Chut	Comedy crime thriller	
A P R I L	17	The Correspondent	Kriv Stenders	Richard Roxburgh, Julian Maroun, Rahel Romahn, Yael Stone, Nicholas Cassim, Mojean Aria, Fayssal Bazzi	Biography, thriller	
M A Y	29	Bring Her Back	Danny and Michael Philippou	Sally Hawkins, Billy Barratt, Jonah Wren Phillips, Sally-Anne Upton, Stephen Phillips, Sora Wong, Liam Damons	Horror	
J U N E	12	Dangerous Animals	Sean Byrne	Hassie Harrison, Josh Heuston, Rob Carlton, Ella Newton, Liam Greinke, Jai Courtney	Horror	
J U L Y	2	Fear Below	Matthew Holmes	Hermione Corfield, Jake Ryan, Jacob Junior Nayinggul, Arthur Angel, Josh McConville, Maximillian Johnson, Clayton Watson	Action adventure horror	
J U L Y	31	Together	Michael Shanks	Dave Franco, Alison Brie, Damon Herriman, Mia Morrissey, Karl Richmond, Jack Kenny	Horror	
A U G U S T	21	Kangaroo Island	Timothy David	Rebecca Breeds, Adelaide Clemens, Erik Thomson, Joel Jackson	Drama	
A U G U S T	21	Primitive War	Luke Sparke	Ryan Kwanten, Tricia Helfer, Nick Wechsler, Jeremy Piven, Anthony Ingruber, Aaron Glenane	Science fiction action horror	
S E P T E M B E R	11	Lesbian Space Princess	Emma Hough Hobbs, Leela Varghese	Shabana Azeez, Bernie Van Tiel, Gemma Chua-Tran, Richard Roxburgh, Kween Kong, Aunty Donna	Adult animation, science fiction comedy	
S E P T E M B E R	11	Went Up the Hill	Samuel Van Grinsven	Dacre Montgomery, Vicky Krieps, Sarah Peirse, Arlo Green	Psychological drama	
S E P T E M B E R	18	Kangaroo	Kate Woods	Ryan Corr, Lily Whiteley, Deborah Mailman, Rachel House, Rarriwuy Hick, Rick Donald, Brooke Satchwell	Family	
O C T O B E R	9	We Bury the Dead	Zak Hilditch	Daisy Ridley, Mark Coles Smith, Brenton Thwaites, Chloe Hurst, Matt Whelan	Survival thriller	
O C T O B E R	9	The Travellers	Bruce Beresford	Luke Bracey, Bryan Brown, Susie Porter, Shubshri Kandiah, Celia Massingham, Nicholas Hammond	Drama	
O C T O B E R	12	One More Shot	Nicholas Clifford	Emily Browning, Aisha Dee, Sean Keenan, Pallavi Sharda, Ashley Zukerman, Hamish Michael, Anna McGahan, Contessa Treffone	Comedy	
O C T O B E R	15	Jimpa	Sophie Hyde	Olivia Colman, Aud Mason-Hyde, John Lithgow, Kate Box, Daniel Henshall, Eamon Farren, Deborah Kennedy, Hans Kesting	Drama	
O C T O B E R	16	Iron Winter	Kasimir Burgess	Feature documentary	Asia, environmental, First Nations, nature	
O C T O B E R	19	The Fox	Dario Russo	Jai Courtney, Emily Browning, Damon Herriman, voices of Sam Neill and Olivia Colman	Comedy	
O C T O B E R	26	Wolfram	Warwick Thornton	Deborah Mailman, Pedrea Jackson, Thomas M. Wright, Anni Finsterer, Natassia Gorey-Furber, Erroll Shand, Joe Bird, John Howard, Jason Chong, Matt Nable	Drama/Australian Western/First Nations	
N O V E M B E R	30	Bump: A Christmas Film	Margie Beattie	Claudia Karvan, Angus Sampson, Nathalie Morris, Carlos Sanson Jr, Paula Garcia, Christian Byers, Anita Hegh	Comedy drama	

== See also ==
- 2025 in Australia
- 2025 in Australian television
- List of 2025 box office number-one films in Australia

Preceded by Australian films 2024	Australian films 2025	Succeeded by Australian films 2026
