= List of 2026 box office number-one films in Australia =

The following is a list of 2026 box office number-one films in Australia by weekend.

== Number-one films ==
This is a list of films which have placed number one at the box office in Australia during 2026.

#	Weekend end date	Film	Weekend gross	Top 10 openings	Ref.
1	4 January 2026	Avatar: Fire and Ash	US$4,687,737	Song Sung Blue (#5), The Choral (#6)	
2	11 January 2025				
3	18 January 2025				
4	25 January 2025				
5	1 February 2025				

== Highest-grossing films ==
=== In-year releases ===
Highest-grossing films of 2026
Rank	Title	Distributor	Aus gross US$	Aus gross AU$
1	Spider-Man: Brand New Day	Sony	$62,034,532	
2	The Odyssey	Universal	$49,690,646	
3	Michael	Universal	$33,313,227	
4				
5				
6				
7				
8				
9				
10				

== See also ==
- List of Australian films of 2026
- 2026 in film
- List of 2027 box office number-one films in Australia

Preceded by 2025 Box office number-one films	Box office number-one films 2026	Succeeded by 2027 Box office number-one films
