= List of Australian films of 2026 =

The following is a list of Australian films that have been or will be released in 2026.

== Films ==
Opening		Title	Director	Cast	Genre	Ref.
J A N U A R Y	1	The Pout-Pout Fish	Ricard Cussó, Rio Harrington	Nick Offerman, Nina Oyama, Miranda Otto, Remy Hii, Jordin Sparks, Amy Sedaris	Children's	
J A N U A R Y	16	Killer Whale	Jo-Anne Brechin	Virginia Gardner, Mel Jarnson, Mitchell Hope, Isaac Crawley, Scott George	Survival thriller	
F E B R U A R Y	12	War Machine	Patrick Hughes	Alan Ritchson, Dennis Quaid, Stephan James, Jai Courtney, Esai Morales, Keiynan Lonsdale, Daniel Webber	Military science fiction action	
M A R C H	5	Live It Up: The Mental As Anything Story	Matthew Walker	Martin Plaza, Peter O'Doherty, Reg Mombassa, David Twohill, Greedy Smith	Documentary	
A P R I L	2	Whale Shark Jack	Miranda Edmonds, Khrob Edmonds	Abbie Cornish, Michael Dorman, Alyla Browne, Rachel Ward, Ursula Yovich, Karen O'Leary	Family	
A P R I L	23	Beast	Tyler Atkins	Russell Crowe, Daniel MacPherson, Luke Hemsworth, Mojean Aria, George Burgess	Action, drama	
M A Y	1	All My Friends Are Back in Brisbane	Louise Alston	Nelle Lee, Andrew Steel, Kym Jackson, Tim Ross, Julian Curtis, Dan Ewing	Romantic comedy	
M A Y	14	Life Could Be a Dream	Jasmin Tarasin	Maeve Dermody, Alexander England, Sonny McGee, Noam Sen-Gupta, Septimus Caton	Drama	
J U N E	11	How to Talk Australians: The Movie	Tony Rogers	Eddie Baroo, Stephen Curry, Madeleine Dyer, Alison Fonseca	Comedy	
J U N E	18	Leviticus	Adrian Chiarella	Joe Bird, Stacy Clausen, Jeremy Blewitt, Ewen Leslie, Davida McKenzie, Nicholas Hope, Zamira Newman, Mia Wasikowska	Romantic supernatural horror	
J U N E	26	The Get Out	Derrick Borte	Russell Crowe, Luke Evans, Teresa Palmer, Danny Zovatto, Josh McConville, Nina Dobrev, Aaron Paul	Crime thriller	
J U L Y	9	Saccharine	Natalie Erika James	Midori Francis, Danielle Macdonald, Madeleine Madden, Robert Taylor, Showko Showfukutei, Annie Shapero	Supernatural horror	
J U L Y	23	Penny Lane Is Dead	Mia'kate Russell	Alexandra Jensen, Steve Le Marquand, Ben O'Toole, Fletcher Humphrys, Bailey Spalding, Sophia Wright-Mendelsohn, Tahlee Fereday	Dark comedy horror	
J U L Y	30	The Birthday Trip	James Robert Woods	David Quirk, Luke Jacobz, Annelise Hall, Ben Gerrard, Sapphire Blossom, Nicola Frew, Robert Preston, Josephine Starte	Satirical comedy drama	
A U G U S T	12	Tina Arena: Unravel Me	Adrian Russell-Wills	Tina Arena, Marc Anthony, Ronan Keating, Jessica Mauboy, Johnny Young, Jessica Origliasso, Lisa Origliasso	Documentary	
A U G U S T	15	Poster Boy: Becoming Zyzz	Selina Miles	Aziz "Zyzz" Shavershian, Said Shavershian, Paolo Cianci, Shaun Hunt, Phillip Raymond, George Mourgalakis	Documentary	
S E P T E M B E R	3	Silenced	Selina Miles	Jennifer Robinson, Amber Heard, Brittany Higgins, Catalina Ruiz-Navarro, Philipa Cracknell, Nicola Stocker	Documentary	
O C T O B E R	5	Cop This	Ed Kavalee, Peter Lawler	Ed Kavalee, Nicolette Minster, Ray O'Leary, Rob Carlton, Tony Martin, Toby Truslove, Gary Sweet	Comedy	
O C T O B E R	9	Tenzing	Jennifer Peedom	Genden Phuntsok, Tom Hiddleston, Willem Dafoe, Caitríona Balfe, Thinley Lhamo	Biographical drama	
N O V E M B E R	12	Allen	Daley Pearson, Jeffrey Walker	T. J. Power, Charlotte Nicdao, Josh Helman, Emily Barclay, Benedict Hardie	Science-fiction, family	

== See also ==
- 2026 in Australia
- 2026 in Australian television
- List of 2026 box office number-one films in Australia

Preceded by Australian films 2025	Australian films 2026	Succeeded by Australian films 2027
