= List of 2021 box office number-one films in Australia =

This is a list of films which have placed number one at the box office in Australia during 2021.

== Number-one films ==
†	This implies the highest-grossing movie of the year.

#	Weekend end date	Film	Weekend gross	Top 20 openings
1	3 January 2021	Wonder Woman 1984	US$3,197,811	The Dry (#3), Monster Hunter (#4), Dragon Rider (#6), Another Round (#14)
2	10 January 2021	The Dry	US$1,584,417	Promising Young Woman (#5), Buddy Games (#8), Dreambuilders (#10), Maya the Bee 3: The Golden Orb (#11), Summerland (#12), Warm Hug (#15), Krack (#19)
3	17 January 2021	The Dry	US$1,456,939	Master (#6), Shadow in the Cloud (#8), Music (#9), Ammonite (#14), My Salinger Year (#17), Red (#18)
4	24 January 2021	Penguin Bloom	US$1,164,605	The Marksman (#4)
5	31 January 2021	The Dry	US$1,093,682	High Ground (#5), Occupation: Rainfall (#9), Pixie (#13)
6	7 February 2021	Promising Young Woman	US$239,241	The Nest (#2)
7	14 February 2021	A Writer's Odyssey	US$147,026	
8	21 February 2021	The Little Things	US$1,400,000	New Gods: Nezha Reborn (#3)
9	28 February 2021	The Little Things	US$742,000	
10	7 March 2021	Raya and the Last Dragon	US$1,110,130	
11	14 March 2021	Raya and the Last Dragon	US$1,078,300	
12	21 March 2021	Raya and the Last Dragon	US$1,119,496	Chaos Walking (#2), Nomadland (#3), Crisis (#4), Hi, Mom (#6), French Exit (#8), Demon Slayer: Kimetsu no Yaiba the Movie: Mugen Train (#9), Minari (#10), Jathi Ratnalu (#12), Judas and the Black Messiah (#15), Mumbai Saga (#16), Girls Can't Surf (#18), Boss Level (#19), Cosmic Sin (#20)
13	28 March 2021	Godzilla vs. Kong	US$5,864,961	Peter Rabbit 2: The Runaway (#2), The Father (#8), Rang De (#15), Mick Fleetwood & Friends celebrate the music of Peter Green (#16), The Last Vermeer (#18)
14	4 April 2021	Godzilla vs. Kong	US$3,574,555	Nobody (#3), Tom & Jerry (#4), The Courier (#5), Sulthan (#11), One (#19), Wild Dog (#20)
15	11 April 2021	Godzilla vs. Kong	US$2,591,125	Voyagers (#8), Vakeel Saab (#9), Ascendant (#10), Karnan (#12), My Donkey, My Lover & I (#13)
16	18 April 2021	Peter Rabbit 2: The Runaway	US$2,229,479	The Unholy (#5), Supernova (#9), Nayattu (#17)
17	25 April 2021	Mortal Kombat	US$2,806,014	Six Minutes to Midnight (#5), Every Breath You Take (#11), The United States vs. Billie Holiday (#15)
18	2 May 2021	Raya and the Last Dragon	US$99,688	
19	9 May 2021	Wrath of Man	US$979,092	June Again (#3), Fatale (#6), Locked Down (#9), Cliff Walkers (#14), My Love (#17), De Gaulle (#18)
20	16 May 2021	Those Who Wish Me Dead	US$871,811	Spiral (#3), Radhe (#7), Finding You (#10), Detective Conan: The Scarlet Bullet (#20)
21	23 May 2021	Wrath of Man	US$556,295	Death of a Ladies' Man (#14), Mama Weed (#18), Songbird (#20)
22	30 May 2021	A Quiet Place Part II	US$4,000,000	Cruella (#2), My Name is Gulpilil (#12)
23	6 June 2021	The Conjuring: The Devil Made Me Do It	US$2,236,187	Breaking News in Yuba County (#9), Minamata (#11), Love Will Tear Us Apart (#20)
24	13 June 2021	The Conjuring: The Devil Made Me Do It	US$1,713,157	Dream Horse (#4), Spirit Untamed (#5), Bon Jovi From Encore Nights (#9), Heroic Losers (#14)
25	20 June 2021	F9	US$6,695,630	Playing with Sharks: The Valerie Taylor Story (#10), From the Vine (#11), The Mole Agent (#13)
26	27 June 2021	F9	US$2,845,619	Hitman's Wife's Bodyguard (#2), In the Heights (#3), Buckley's Chance (#9), Monster Zone (#10), Moonbound (#11)
27	4 July 2021	F9	US$1,449,051	Escape Room: Tournament of Champions (#6), Herself (#14), Perfumes (#16), Werewolves Within (#20)
28	11 July 2021	Black Widow	US$4,596,798	Leonardo: The Works (#18)
29	18 July 2021	Space Jam: A New Legacy	US$1,695,375	Nine Days (#9), Sir Alex Ferguson: Never Give In (#20)
30	25 July 2021	Space Jam: A New Legacy	US$584,481	Old (#3), Rosa's Wedding (#12)
31	1 August 2021	Jungle Cruise	US$1,151,788	The Misfits (#9), Shiva Baby (#16)
32	8 August 2021	The Suicide Squad	US$1,039,880	Tunka Tunka (#6), The Rose Maker (#8), Blackpink: The Movie (#10)
33	15 August 2021	The Suicide Squad	US$925,724	Free Guy (#2), The Ice Road (#5), Puaada (#8)
34	22 August 2021	Free Guy	US$816,563	Respect (#3), The Night House (#5), Reminiscence (#7), Raging Fire (#10), The Cave (#14)
35	29 August 2021	Free Guy	US$648,895	Don't Breathe 2 (#4), Candyman (#5), Annette (#15)
36	5 September 2021	Shang-Chi and the Legend of the Ten Rings	US$1,452,428	Eiffel (#10), Summer of Soul (#12)
37	12 September 2021	Shang-Chi and the Legend of the Ten Rings	US$1,032,571	Respect (#2), Ride the Eagle (#11), Love in Bright Landscapes (#15), Yaar Anmulle Returns (#20)
38	19 September 2021	Shang-Chi and the Legend of the Ten Rings	US$833,951	PAW Patrol: The Movie (#3), Ainbo: Spirit of the Amazon (#6), Pig (#12), Die in a Gunfight (#14), The Killing of Two Lovers (#17), Dogtanian and the Three Muskehounds (#18), Thana Sadar (#20)
39	26 September 2021	Shang-Chi and the Legend of the Ten Rings	US$648,573	Joe Bell (#7), Time Is Up (#10), Oasis Knebworth 1996 (#11), Qismat 2 (#12), Flashback (#15), Love Story (#16)
40	3 October 2021	Shang-Chi and the Legend of the Ten Rings	US$697,872	Chal Mera Putt 3 (#6), Nitram (#10), Riders of Justice (#19)
41	10 October 2021	Shang-Chi and the Legend of the Ten Rings	US$394,571	My Country, My Parents (#11), Doctor (#13), Love Is Love Is Love (#14), A Fire Inside (#18)
42	17 October 2021	Shang-Chi and the Legend of the Ten Rings	US$1,057,862	Honsla Rakh (#3), Most Eligible Bachelor (#17)
43	24 October 2021	Shang-Chi and the Legend of the Ten Rings	US$847,579	The Last Duel (#2), Malignant (#3), Yes I am Student (#13), Love You Like That (#15), Roadrunner: A Film About Anthony Bourdain (#18)
44	31 October 2021	Shang-Chi and the Legend of the Ten Rings	US$1,217,156	Ron's Gone Wrong (#3), Antlers (#4)
45	7 November 2021	Eternals	US$4,864,865	Sooryavanshi (#5), The Many Saints of Newark (#6), Annaatthe (#7), Paani Ch Madhaani (#9)
46	14 November 2021	No Time to Die	US$8,247,000	Anita (#6)
47	21 November 2021	No Time to Die	US$4,802,326	Last Night in Soho (#3), Kurup (#7), Warning (#8), Bunty Aur Babli 2 (#10), Zola (#16), Fuffad Ji (#17), Railway Heroes (#18), Songs for While I'm Away (#19)
48	28 November 2021	Venom: Let There Be Carnage	US$4,613,339	A Boy Called Christmas (#5), Antim: The Final Truth (#8), Maanaadu (#10), Cliff Richard: The Great 80 Tour (#11), Best Sellers (#12), Cry Macho (#15), Titane (#17), Satyameva Jayate 2 (#18)
49	5 December 2021	Dune	US$3,379,160	Encanto (#4), André Rieu: Christmas with André (#6), Akhanda (#8), Marakkar: Lion of the Arabian Sea (#10), The Battle at Lake Changjin (#11), Delicious (#13), The Lost Leonardo (#17), Tadap (#20)
50	12 December 2021	Dune	US$1,986,931	The French Dispatch (#5), Resident Evil: Welcome to Raccoon City (#7), Dear Evan Hansen (#8), Teeja Punjab (#11), Sword Art Online: Progressive - Aria of a Starless Night (#12), Chandigarh Kare Aashiqui (#13), Monsta X: The Dreaming (#16)
51	19 December 2021	Spider-Man: No Way Home †	US$18,657,220	Pushpa: The Rise (#6), Shava Ni Girdhari Lal (#17)
52	26 December 2021	Spider-Man: No Way Home †	US$5,172,553	The Matrix Resurrections (#2), Sing 2 (#3), 83 (#4), West Side Story (#8), Shyam Singha Roy (#13), Licorice Pizza (#14), Royal Ballet: The Nutcracker (#19)

== Highest-grossing films ==
International film Australian film

Highest-grossing films of 2021
Rank	Title	Distributor	Domestic gross
1	Spider-Man: No Way Home	Sony	$37,912,478
2	Godzilla vs. Kong	Warner Bros.	$21,069,498
3	F9	Universal	$15,822,678
4	Peter Rabbit 2: The Runaway	Sony	$15,645,480
5	The Dry	Roadshow Films	$15,016,162
6	Shang-Chi and the Legend of the Ten Rings	Disney	$12,522,238
7	Eternals	Disney	$10,877,919
8	Wonder Woman 1984	Warner Bros.	$10,746,283
9	The Croods: A New Age	Universal	$10,679,106
10	Venom: Let There Be Carnage	Sony	$10,343,071

== See also ==
- List of Australian films – Australian films by year
- 2021 in film

Preceded by 2020 Box office number-one films	Box office number-one films 2021	Succeeded by 2022 Box office number-one films
