= List of 1990 box office number-one films in Australia =

This is a list of films which have placed number one at the weekly box office in Australia during 1990. Amounts are in Australian dollars.

== Number-one films ==
†	This implies the highest-grossing movie of the year.

#	Week ending	Film	Gross	Notes	Ref
1	3 January 1990	The War of the Roses	$1,411,276		
2	10 January 1990	The War of the Roses	$1,243,645		
3	17 January 1990	The War of the Roses	$1,036,591		
4	24 January 1990	Black Rain	$1,102,849		
5	31 January 1990	Black Rain	$804,156		
6	7 February 1990	Black Rain	$718,387		
7	14 February 1990	Black Rain	$481,393		
8	21 February 1990	Born on the Fourth of July	$788,618	Born on the Fourth of July reached number one in its second week of release	
9	28 February 1990	Tango & Cash	$766,882		
10	7 March 1990	Tango & Cash	$598,125		
11	14 March 1990	Tango & Cash	$621,362		
12	21 March 1990	Look Who's Talking	$1,586,624		
13	28 March 1990	Look Who's Talking	$1,278,892		
14	4 April 1990	Look Who's Talking	$1,121,286		
15	10 April 1990	The Hunt for Red October	$1,080,000	Six days only	
16	18 April 1990	Look Who's Talking	$1,596,872	Look Who's Talking returned to number one in its fifth week of release	
17	25 April 1990	The Adventures of Milo and Otis	$1,427,583	The Adventures of Milo and Otis reached number one in its fourth week of release	
18	2 May 1990	Look Who's Talking	$620,784	Look Who's Talking returned to number one in its seventh week of release	
19	9 May 1990	Pretty Woman †	$1,400,000		
20	16 May 1990	Pretty Woman †	$1,466,706		
21	23 May 1990	Pretty Woman †	$1,501,712		
22	30 May 1990	Pretty Woman †	$1,438,535		
23	6 June 1990	Pretty Woman †	$1,292,800		
24	13 June 1990	Pretty Woman †	$1,447,778		
25	20 June 1990	Pretty Woman †	$1,146,003		
26	27 June 1990	Dick Tracy	$1,673,890	Dick Tracy set an opening weekend record for a Disney film	
27	4 July 1990	Pretty Woman †	$1,430,180	Pretty Woman returned to number one in its ninth week of release	
28	11 July 1990	Pretty Woman †	$1,617,311		
29	18 July 1990	Pretty Woman †	$1,451,352		
30	25 July 1990	Pretty Woman †	$1,178,070		
31	1 August 1990	Pretty Woman †	$952,948		
32	8 August 1990	Teenage Mutant Ninja Turtles	$1,946,653		
33	15 August 1990	Teenage Mutant Ninja Turtles	$2,029,758		
34	22 August 1990	Teenage Mutant Ninja Turtles	$1,600,000		
35	29 August 1990	Teenage Mutant Ninja Turtles	$1,077,363		
36	5 September 1990	Die Hard 2	$1,758,085	Die Hard 2 had a record opening for a Fox film	
37	12 September 1990	Die Hard 2	$1,220,613		
38	19 September 1990	Days of Thunder	$1,811,611		
39	26 September 1990	Days of Thunder	$1,274,029		
40	3 October 1990	Days of Thunder	$1,165,084		
41	10 October 1990	Days of Thunder	$759,161		
42	17 October 1990	Days of Thunder	TBD		
43	24 October 1990	Flatliners	$480,963	On the official chart, Flatliners reached number one in its sixth week of release although previews of Ghost were higher with A$845,244	
44	31 October 1990	Ghost	$2,097,276		
45	7 November 1990	Ghost	$1,868,391		
46	14 November 1990	Ghost	$1,739,175		
47	21 November 1990	Ghost	$1,426,879		
48	28 November 1990	Ghost	$1,397,521		
49	5 December 1990	Ghost	$1,276,469		
50	12 December 1990	Total Recall	$1,989,771		
51	19 December 1990	Total Recall	$1,286,503		
52	26 December 1990	Home Alone	$900,005	Home Alone reached number one in its second week of release	

== See also ==
- List of Australian films - Australian films by year
- Lists of box office number-one films

1990	Succeeded by 1991
