= List of 2025 box office number-one films in Australia =

The following is a list of 2025 box office number-one films in Australia by weekend.

== Number-one films ==
This is a list of films which have placed number one at the box office in Australia during 2025.

#	Weekend end date	Film	Weekend gross	Top 10 openings	Ref.
1	5 January 2025	Paddington in Peru	US$1,863,606	Nosferatu (#3)	
2	12 January 2025	Sonic the Hedgehog 3	US$1,814,289	Conclave (#5), Den of Thieves 2: Pantera (#8), Game Changer (#10)	
3	19 January 2025	Mufasa: The Lion King	US$1,230,700	We Live in Time (#3), Wolf Man (#8)	
4	26 January 2025	A Complete Unknown	US$862,700	Flight Risk (#7), The Brutalist (#10)	
5	2 February 2025	A Complete Unknown	US$720,209	Babygirl (#2), Companion (#8), Creation of the Gods II: Demon Force (#9), Detective Chinatown 1900 (#10)	
6	9 February 2025	A Complete Unknown	US$541,957	Becoming Led Zeppelin (#5), Presence (#8), Vidaamuyarchi (#9)	
7	16 February 2025	Captain America: Brave New World	US$3,679,054	Bridget Jones: Mad About the Boy (#2), Ne Zha 2 (#3), Chhaava (#5)	
8	23 February 2025	Captain America: Brave New World	US$1,550,396	The Monkey (#4)	
9	2 March 2025	Bridget Jones: Mad About the Boy	US$1,121,937	In the Lost Lands (#8), The Last Journey (#9)	
10	9 March 2025	Mickey 17	US$1,056,263	One of Them Days (#9), Spit (#10)	
11	16 March 2025	Mickey 17	US$776,188	Black Bag (#2)	
12	23 March 2025	Snow White	US$1,874,258	Flow (#6), Locked (#7), The Alto Knights (#8)	
13	30 March 2025	Snow White	US$1,096,712	A Working Man (#2), L2: Empuraan (#3), The Day the Earth Blew Up: A Looney Tunes Movie (#7), Sikandar (#9)	
14	6 April 2025	A Minecraft Movie	US$8,266,766	Dog Man (#3), Novocaine (#7)	
15	13 April 2025	A Minecraft Movie	US$6,548,851	The Amateur (#2), The Chosen: Last Supper (#4), André Rieu's 75th Birthday Celebration: The Dream Continues (#5), Death of a Unicorn (#7), Good Bad Ugly (#9), Akaal: The Unconquered (#10)	
16	20 April 2025	A Minecraft Movie	US$3,807,375	Sinners (#2), Warfare (#5), Drop (#6), Kesari Chapter 2 (#9)	
17	27 April 2025	A Minecraft Movie	US$2,910,947	Star Wars: Episode III – Revenge of the Sith (20th Anniversary) (#2), The Accountant 2 (#4), Until Dawn (#6), Thudarum (#9), Pink Floyd: Live at Pompeii (2025 re-release) (#10)	
18	4 May 2025	Thunderbolts*	US$3,389,966	Guru Nanak Jahaz (#6), Raid 2 (#7), HIT: The Third Case (#8), Stelios (#10)	
19	11 May 2025	Thunderbolts*	US$1,957,622	Tina (#5), Ocean with David Attenborough (#6), Clown in a Cornfield (#7), The Chosen: Woes/The Same Coin/Because of Me (#9)	
20	18 May 2025	Final Destination Bloodlines	US$1,304,748	The Salt Path (#5), Unko Sweater - The Woolen Sweater (#9), Hurry Up Tomorrow (#10)	
21	25 May 2025	Lilo & Stitch	US$6,004,844	—N/a	
22	1 June 2025	Lilo & Stitch	US$4,097,417	Bring Her Back (#3), Peppa Meets the Baby Cinema Experience (#4), The Phoenician Scheme (#5), Saunkan Saunkne 2 (#8)	
23	8 June 2025	Lilo & Stitch	US$2,713,449	Karate Kid: Legends (#2), Housefull 5 (#5), Thug Life (#7)	
24	15 June 2025	How to Train Your Dragon	US$4,400,634	Materialists (#2)	
25	22 June 2025	How to Train Your Dragon	US$3,202,176	28 Years Later (#2), Elio (#5), Sitaare Zameen Par (#7), Kuberaa (#9)	
26	29 June 2025	F1: The Movie	US$5,055,852	M3GAN 2.0 (#7), Sardaar Ji 3 (#8)	
27	6 July 2025	Jurassic World: Rebirth	US$5,937,505	—N/a	
28	13 July 2025	Superman	US$5,331,324	—N/a	
29	20 July 2025	Superman	US$3,588,222	I Know What You Did Last Summer (#5), Sarbala Ji (#9)	
30	27 July 2025	The Fantastic Four: First Steps	US$4,221,796	Four Letters of Love (#9)	
31	3 August 2025	The Fantastic Four: First Steps	US$2,365,763	Chal Mera Putt 4 (#9), Together (#6), Bride Hard (#10)	
32	10 August 2025	Weapons	US$1,844,430	Freakier Friday (#2), Mahavatar Narsimha (#7), Stans (#9)	
33	17 August 2025	Weapons	US$1,279,791	Coolie (#2), War 2 (#5), Nobody 2 (#6), Mr Burton (#10)	
34	24 August 2025	Weapons	US$905,594	The Shadow's Edge (#8), Eddington (#9)	
35	31 August 2025	The Naked Gun	US$712,778	André Rieu's 2025 Maastricht Concert: Waltz the Night Away! (#3), Jaws: 2025 Re-release (50th Anniversary) (#5), Caught Stealing (#6), Lokah Chapter 1: Chandra (#9), Hridayapoorvam (#10)	
36	7 September 2025	The Conjuring: Last Rites	US$3,196,173	The Roses (#2), Madharasi (#9), Fight or Flight (#10)	
37	14 September 2025	Demon Slayer: Kimetsu no Yaiba – The Movie: Infinity Castle	US$2,713,222	Downton Abbey: The Grand Finale (#3), The Long Walk (#5), Mirai (#6), Toy Story: 2025 Re-release (#6)	
38	21 September 2025	The Conjuring: Last Rites	US$1,290,415	The Bad Guys 2 (#3), A Big Bold Beautiful Journey (#5), Kangaroo (#6), Jolly LLB 3 (#8), 731 (#10)	
39	28 September 2025	The Bad Guys 2	US$1,014,082	One Battle After Another (#2), Gabby's Dollhouse: The Movie (#4), They Call Him OG (#8)	
40	5 October 2025	The Bad Guys 2	US$1,595,597	Avatar: The Way of Water: 2025 Re-release (#3), Him (#5)	
41	12 October 2025	Tron: Ares	US$1,446,476	The Travellers (#6), Kantara: A Legend - Chapter 1 (#7)	
42	19 October 2025	Black Phone 2	US$908,773	Roofman (#3), After the Hunt (#10)	
43	26 October 2025	Chainsaw Man - The Movie: Reze Arc	US$740,467	Springsteen: Deliver Me from Nowhere (#2), Thamma (#9)	
44	2 November 2025	Chainsaw Man - The Movie: Reze Arc	US$410,118	Good Fortune (#4), Bugonia (#5), A PAW Patrol Christmas (#7)	
45	9 November 2025	Back to the Future	US$472,997	Predator: Badlands (#7)	
46	16 November 2025	Now You See Me: Now You Don't	US$1,305,715	Hamilton: 2025 Re-release (#3), De De Pyaar De 2 (#6)	
47	23 November 2025	Wicked: For Good	US$7,535,784	—N/a	
48	30 November 2025	Zootopia 2	US$3,793,886	Nuremberg (#5), Dead of Winter (#6), Tere Ishk Mein (#7)	
49	7 December 2025	Zootopia 2	US$2,745,671	Five Nights at Freddy's 2 (#2), Andre Rieu's 2025 Christmas Concert: Merry Christmas (#4), Jujutsu Kaisen: Execution (#6), Dhurandhar (#7), Eternity (#8)	
50	14 December 2025	Zootopia 2	US$2,339,312	Ella McCay (#9)	
51	21 December 2025	Avatar: Fire and Ash	US$8,293,872	—N/a	
52	28 December 2025	Avatar: Fire and Ash	US$5,553,138	Anaconda (#2), The Housemaid (#3), Rental Family (#7), Sentimental Value (#10)	

== Highest-grossing films ==
=== In-year releases ===
Highest-grossing films of 2025
Rank	Title	Distributor	Aus gross US$	Aus gross AU$
1	Avatar: Fire and Ash	Disney	$38,005,964	
2	Zootopia 2	Disney	$27,890,390	
3	Lilo & Stitch	Disney	$23,673,634	
4	Wicked: For Good	Universal	$21,674,617	
5	How to Train Your Dragon	Universal	$20,998,664	
6	Jurassic World: Rebirth	Universal	$20,600,908	
7	Mission: Impossible - The Final Reckoning	Paramount	$15,283,868	
8	The Fantastic Four: First Steps	Disney	$12,088,301	
9	Bridget Jones: Mad About the Boy	Universal	$10,454,436	
10	The Bad Guys 2	Universal	$10,381,708	

== See also ==
- List of Australian films of 2025
- 2025 in film
- List of 2023 box office number-one films in Australia

Preceded by 2024 Box office number-one films	Box office number-one films 2025	Succeeded by 2026 Box office number-one films
