= Ghost (1990 film) =

Film by Jerry Zucker

- Theatrical release poster
- Directed by: Jerry Zucker
- Written by: Bruce Joel Rubin
- Produced by: Lisa Weinstein
- Starring: Patrick Swayze; Demi Moore; Whoopi Goldberg; Tony Goldwyn
- Cinematography: Adam Greenberg
- Edited by: Walter Murch
- Music by: Maurice Jarre
- Production companies: Paramount Pictures; Howard W. Koch Productions
- Distributed by: Paramount Pictures
- Release date: July 13, 1990
- Running time: 127 minutes
- Country: United States
- Language: English
- Budget: $22–23 million
- Box office: $505.7 million

Ghost is a 1990 American supernatural romance film directed by Jerry Zucker, written by Bruce Joel Rubin, and starring Patrick Swayze, Demi Moore, Whoopi Goldberg, and Tony Goldwyn. The film's plot follows Sam Wheat (Swayze), a banker who is murdered and returns as a ghost, unable to interact with the living world. With the help of psychic con artist Oda Mae Brown (Goldberg), Sam attempts to uncover those responsible for his murder and communicate with his girlfriend, Molly Jensen (Moore), who is unaware of his presence.

Ghost was theatrically released on July 13, 1990 by Paramount Pictures to commercial success. It grossed $505 million against a budget of $22–23 million, was the highest-grossing film of 1990, and at the time of its release was the third-highest-grossing film of all time. The film was a sleeper hit, which unexpectedly outperformed several blockbuster action films released during that summer. Its success extended to the home video market, and it was the most rented film of 1991 in the United States. The film initially received mixed reviews from critics, with praise going towards the score and performances of the cast.

Ghost earned five nominations at the 63rd Academy Awards: Best Picture, Best Original Score, Best Film Editing, and winning Best Supporting Actress for Goldberg and Best Original Screenplay for Rubin.

== Plot ==
Banker Sam Wheat and his artist girlfriend Molly Jensen move into a Tribeca loft with the help of Sam's best friend and co-worker Carl Bruner. One night, the couple is attacked on the street by a mugger, and though Sam appears to chase him away, he returns to a devastated Molly cradling his bloodied corpse and realizes he has died. A bright beam of light shines down on Sam, but he stays with Molly, and the light disappears. As a ghost, a despondent Sam remains by Molly's side. He is unable to interact with the physical world, and the other ghosts he encounters are unhelpful.

Sometime later, the mugger breaks into Molly's apartment, but Sam drives him away by scaring her cat, which scratches the mugger's face. While pursuing the mugger, Sam is attacked by a hostile ghost on the subway train who can move physical objects. Sam follows the mugger back to his apartment, learning his name—Willie Lopez—and that he targeted Sam. Sam later encounters Oda Mae Brown, a charlatan psychic medium, but he realizes she can hear him. He harasses Oda Mae until she agrees to warn Molly that she is in danger.

Molly refuses to believe Oda Mae's claims that Sam's ghost is warning her until Sam tells Oda Mae to say "ditto"—his response whenever Molly said she loved him. Molly tells the police and Carl about Willie, but they dismiss the story and disclose Oda Mae's history of fraud, leaving Molly disheartened.

Meanwhile, Sam follows Carl and learns that he hired Willie to rob Sam of his book of bank passwords. He needs them to launder $4 million in drug money through an account held by the fictional "Rita Miller" for his criminal partners. Carl breaks into Molly's apartment and steals Sam's book. He later attempts to seduce Molly until an enraged Sam inadvertently knocks over a picture frame. Sam returns to the subway and convinces the hostile ghost to teach him to reliably interact with the physical world by focusing his emotions.

Sam visits Oda Mae, who has become popular with ghosts trying to contact the living, and sees another ghost possess Oda Mae but be exhausted by the effort. He convinces her to pose as Rita Miller to withdraw the drug money, which she reluctantly donates to charity. Molly sees the transaction occur during a visit to the bank. As Carl panics over the missing money, Sam uses his abilities to torment him. Carl visits Molly to discuss the haunting, and she unwittingly reveals that Oda Mae withdrew the money. While Molly is upstairs, Sam attacks Carl, who threatens to kill Molly if the money is not returned that night. Carl and Willie travel to confront Oda Mae, but Sam warns her to hide and then terrorizes Willie, causing him to run into the road and be struck by a car. Shadowy figures drag Willie's screaming ghost away.

Oda Mae and Sam return to Molly's apartment, where Sam levitates a penny to convince Molly he is present. After Molly calls the police, Oda Mae allows Sam to possess her so he can dance with Molly. However, the possession leaves him weakened and unable to help when Carl breaks into the apartment. Carl takes Oda Mae and Molly hostage and demands the drug money, but Sam recovers in time to attack him. In a panic, Carl swings a suspended metal hook towards Sam and tries to escape through a window. However, the hook swings back and shatters the window pane, causing a large shard of glass to impale and kill him. Sam witnesses the shadowy figures dragging Carl's ghost away.

As Sam checks on Molly and Oda Mae, the beam of light returns, allowing them both to see and hear him. Sam thanks Oda Mae for her help and kisses Molly, telling her he loves her. She responds, "Ditto", and Sam walks into the light.

== Cast ==
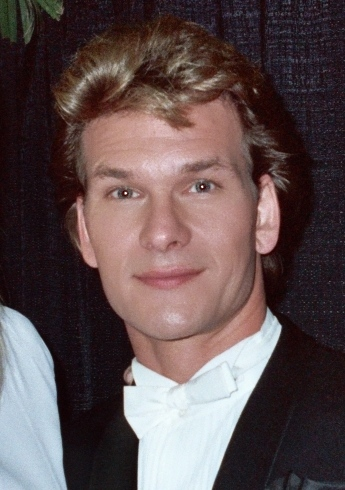
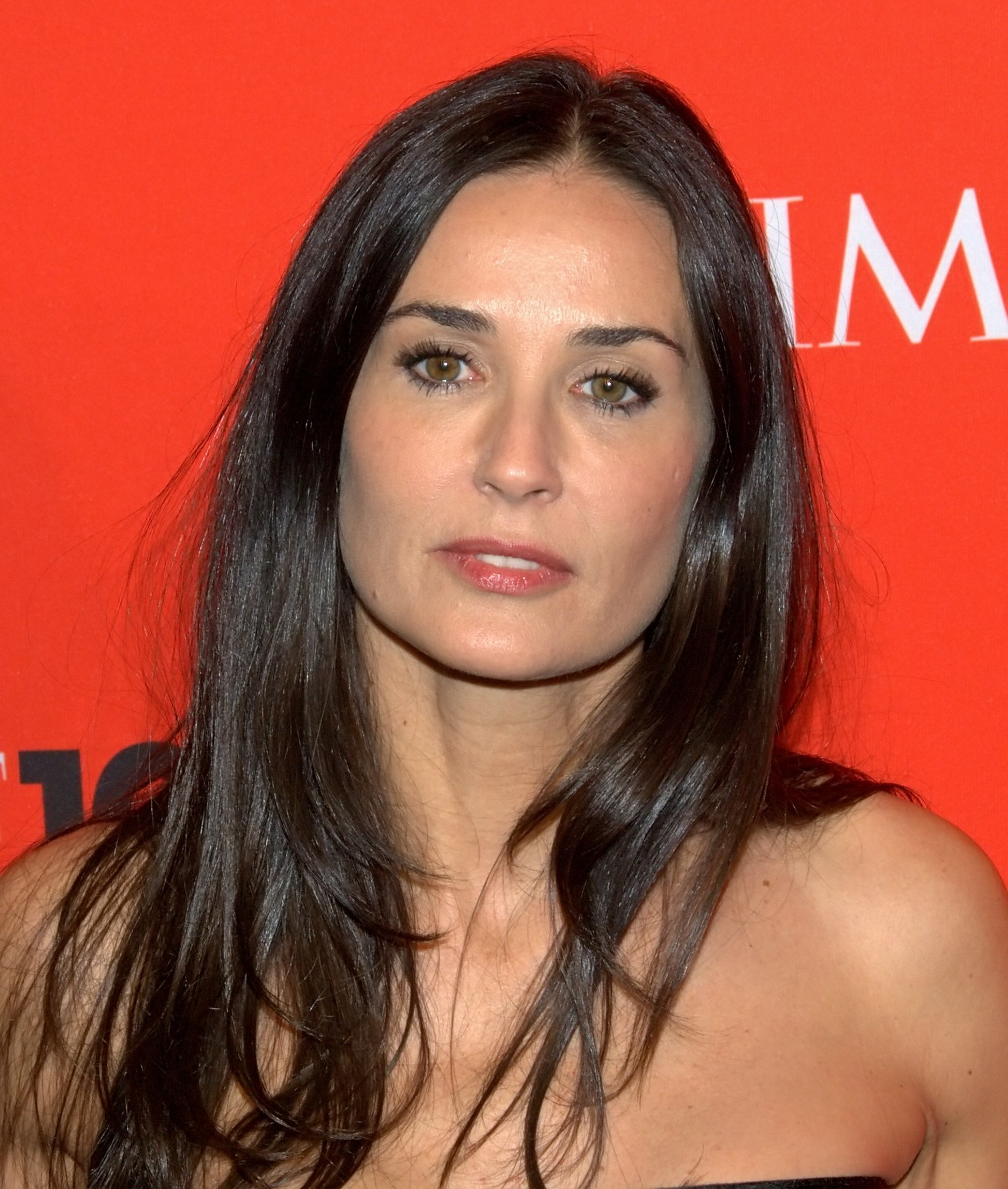
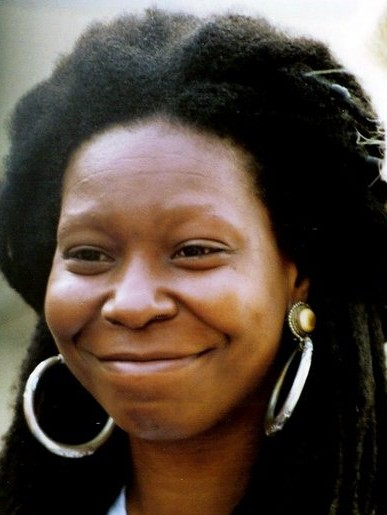
Patrick Swayze (in 1990), Demi Moore (2010), and Whoopi Goldberg (1992)
- Patrick Swayze as Sam Wheat, a banker who is murdered and, as a ghost, desperately tries to warn Molly of an impending danger.
- Demi Moore as Molly Jensen, Sam's girlfriend, and an artist, who is left grieving after his death.
- Whoopi Goldberg as Oda Mae Brown, a medium who is initially unable to actually communicate with the dead, but can hear Sam and agrees to help him save Molly.
- Tony Goldwyn as Carl Bruner, a corrupt banker who initially appears to be Sam's friend, but is revealed to be responsible for his death.
- Rick Aviles as Willie Lopez, Carl's accomplice and Sam's murderer.
- Sharon Breslau Cornell as Cemetery Ghost
- Vincent Schiavelli as Subway Ghost
- Armelia McQueen as Oda Mae's Sister, Clara Brown
- Gail Boggs as Oda Mae's Sister, Louise Brown
- Phil Leeds as Emergency Room Ghost
- Augie Blunt as Orlando
- Stephen Root as Police Sergeant
- Bruce Jarchow as Lyle Ferguson
- Angelina Estrada as Rosa Santiago, a client of Oda Mae Brown

== Production ==
=== Background and filming ===
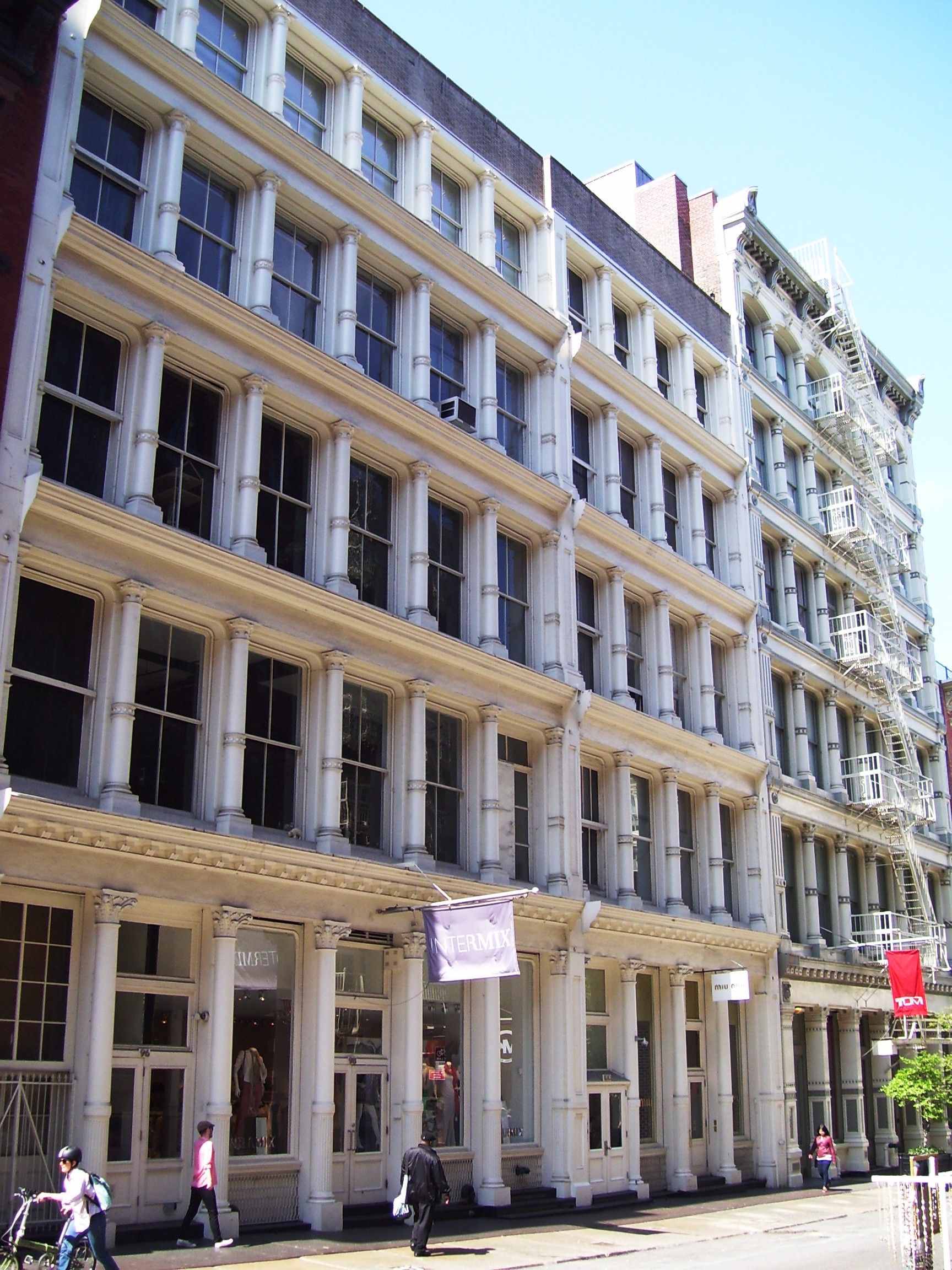
Filming of the apartment took place at 102 Prince Street, lower Manhattan.

Ghost was the first film Jerry Zucker directed on his own, as well as his first dramatic film. He had previously been part of the Zucker, Abrahams and Zucker directing team, known for their parody films. Zucker stated that his decision to direct Ghost was not made to distance himself from comedies or to mark a new chapter in his career, but he was merely "just looking for a good film to direct." The film had previously been pitched to both Frank Oz and Miloš Forman, who both accepted to direct it, but Oz left due to budget concerns not meeting his vision, while Forman was dismissed by Paramount when the studio and screenwriter Bruce Joel Rubin disliked his ideas. When Rubin learned that Zucker was to direct the film and wanted to make changes to his script, he was apprehensive, as he feared Zucker would turn his script into a comedy. However, Rubin changed his mind and warmed up after dining with Zucker and being impressed by how "deeply philosophical" he was.

Harrison Ford, Michael J. Fox, Paul Hogan, Tom Hanks, Kevin Bacon, Kevin Kline, Alec Baldwin, and Tom Cruise were considered for the role of Sam Wheat. Bruce Willis turned the role of Sam Wheat down as he did not understand the script and later called himself a "knucklehead" for declining and later stating he wished he had worked with Moore again. Similarly, Fox thought the film wouldn't work, and, in hindsight, regretted turning the role down. Zucker initially refused to consider Swayze for Sam, though Rubin pitched the project to Swayze behind Zucker's back after seeing him talk about his late father in an interview with Barbara Walters. Zucker then changed his mind after Swayze auditioned. Michelle Pfeiffer, Molly Ringwald, Meg Ryan, Julia Roberts, and Nicole Kidman were considered for the role of Molly Jensen before Moore was hired. Moore was Zucker and Rubin's preferred choice. Tina Turner, Patti LaBelle, and Oprah Winfrey were either considered or auditioned for the role of Oda Mae Brown. Both Zucker and Rubin initially were not interested in casting Whoopi Goldberg as Oda Mae, but Swayze advocated for her to be cast.

Zucker credited arguments from radio host Dennis Prager with deciding to "lighten" Rubin's original script with a moral message. Rubin noted that he "wanted to tell a ghost story from the ghost's perspective": "One day, I was watching a production of Hamlet, which begins with the ghost of Hamlet's father saying, 'Revenge my death,'" he recalled. "I thought, ‘Wow, let's transpose that into the 20th century; it'd be an interesting story.' And the idea hit me."

Filming for Ghost began in July 1989. Many of the interior scenes were shot at Paramount in Los Angeles. The interior of Sam and Molly's loft is a reproduction of the home and studio of artist Michele Oka Doner, built from plans she provided because she declined to allow filming in her loft. It was reconstructed in an unused loft nearby in her Soho neighborhood and featured many of the same details as the actual loft, such as radiators around columns, open stairs and a house-shaped enclosure for the refrigerator. Filming of the apartment took place at 102 Prince Street, Lower Manhattan. The exterior scenes were shot in New York City, particularly in Bedford–Stuyvesant, Soho, and Wall Street, for about five weeks. The film features about 100 special effects shots. Demi Moore's famous 'boy cut' in the movie was designed by Manhattan hair stylist John Sahag; Us Weekly declared Moore "the only woman since Audrey Hepburn who has been able to carry off such a hairdo and still look like a woman."

The final scene used digital video effects. Originally, it was meant to show Patrick Swayze kissing Demi Moore before walking up a mylar platform toward a bluescreen with grips in the shot. VFX supervisor Richard Edlund did not think the audience would buy it, and used Quantel's "Harry" video-compositing system to combine the workprint with Swayze with elements that had been shot on an Oxberry animation stand and things like an endoscope of Christmas tinsel.

=== Music ===
The music for Ghost was written by veteran French composer Maurice Jarre, whose work was nominated for the 1990 Academy Award for Best Original Score (won by John Barry for Dances with Wolves). The soundtrack also featured the 1955 song "Unchained Melody", composed by Alex North with lyrics by Hy Zaret. In Ghost, the song appears both in instrumental and vocal form, the latter being the version recorded by Bobby Hatfield of The Righteous Brothers in 1965.

The soundtrack album was issued worldwide on Milan Records, but licensed to Varèse Sarabande in North America. It was reissued with two extra tracks in 1995, and later as part of Milan's Silver Screen Edition series with the extra tracks and an interview with Maurice Jarre.

== Release ==
Ghost was originally scheduled to be released on July 27, 1990, but its release date was brought forward two weeks early to July 13, 1990. The film became an unexpected box-office success, grossing $505.7 million on a budget of $22 million to $23 million. The film debuted at number 2 behind Die Hard 2 during its first weekend, before topping the box office during its second weekend. The film routinely held the number 2 and number 1 box office spots for two months and also remained in the top five until November 1990.

It was the highest-grossing film of the year 1990. Box Office Mojo estimates that it sold over 51.46 million tickets in the US. It spent eight consecutive weeks at number one at the UK box office and became the highest-grossing film of all time in the UK surpassing E.T. the Extra-Terrestrial with a gross of £23.3 million. That record lasted for three years before getting surpassed by Jurassic Park in 1993. It also spent six consecutive weeks atop the Australian box office. It was the highest-grossing film in Indonesia at the time with a gross of $3.6 million and the highest-grossing foreign film in the Philippines. Then-married couple Demi Moore, who starred in Ghost, and Bruce Willis, who starred in Die Hard 2, therefore had films which they respectively starred in occupy the number 1 and number 2 spots at the box office, a feat that was not be accomplished again by such a couple until Deadpool & Wolverine and It Ends with Us in 2024.

=== Home media ===
Ghost was released on VHS and LaserDisc in the United States on March 21, 1991, and sold 646,000 VHS rentals, breaking the record set by Die Hard 2, and a record 66,040 LaserDiscs. It was the top video rental of 1991 in the United States, and generated a gross of $40 million for Paramount. The video went on sale in the fall and generated sales of $25 million.

The film was released on DVD in 2001, Blu-ray in 2008, and Ultra HD Blu-ray in 2024.

== Reception ==
=== Critical response ===
Most of the reviews for Ghost were so-so. The critics didn't love it, but we were the number one film in the country for 1990, and became one of the most commercially successful films of all time.

— Bruce Joel Rubin

Ghost initially received mixed reviews from critics upon release. Ghost has an approval rating of 76% based on 78 professional reviews on the review aggregator website Rotten Tomatoes, with an average rating of 6.9/10. Its critical consensus reads, "Ghost offers viewers a poignant romance while blending elements of comedy, horror, and mystery, all adding up to one of the more enduringly watchable hits of its era." Metacritic (which uses a weighted average) assigned Ghost a score of 52 out of 100 based on 17 critics, indicating "mixed or average" reviews. Audiences polled by CinemaScore gave the film an average grade of "A" on an A+ to F scale.

Roger Ebert gave Ghost two-and-a-half out of four stars in his review for the Chicago Sun-Times, regarding the film as "no worse an offender than most ghost movies, I suppose. It assumes that even after death we devote most of our attention to unfinished business here on Earth, and that danger to a loved one is more important to a ghost than the infinity it now inhabits." He was also critical of the film's "obligatory action climax", the "ridiculous visitation from the demons of hell", the "slow study" of the Molly character, and the "single best scene" in which Sam overtakes Oda Mae's body to caress Molly: "In strict logic, this should involve us seeing Goldberg kissing Moore, but of course the movie compromises and shows us Swayze holding her – too bad, because the logical version would actually have been more spiritual and moving."

David Ansen of Newsweek, despite finding the ending too sentimental, praised the film as "a zippy pastiche that somehow manages to seem fresh even though it's built entirely out of borrowed parts." Variety magazine called the film "an odd creation – at times nearly smothering in arty somberness, at others veering into good, wacky fun." Goldberg received considerable praise for her performance. In a review for The New York Times, Janet Maslin comments "Ms. Goldberg plays the character's amazement, irritation and great gift for back talk to the hilt. This is one of those rare occasions on which the uncategorizable Ms. Goldberg has found a film role that really suits her, and she makes the most of it." Even some critics who gave negative reviews of Ghost extended praise to Goldberg's work in the film.

=== Accolades ===
| Award | Category | Nominee(s) | Result | Ref. |
|---|---|---|---|---|
| Academy Awards | Best Picture | Lisa Weinstein | Nominated | |
| Academy Awards | Best Supporting Actress | Whoopi Goldberg | Won | |
| Academy Awards | Best Screenplay – Written Directly for the Screen | Bruce Joel Rubin | Won | |
| Academy Awards | Best Film Editing | Walter Murch | Nominated | |
| Academy Awards | Best Original Score | Maurice Jarre | Nominated | |
| American Cinema Editors Awards | Best Edited Feature Film | Walter Murch | Nominated | |
| American Comedy Awards | Funniest Supporting Actress in a Motion Picture | Whoopi Goldberg | Won | |
| American Society of Cinematographers Awards | Outstanding Achievement in Cinematography in Theatrical Releases | Adam Greenberg | Nominated | |
| ASCAP Film and Television Music Awards | Top Box Office Films | Maurice Jarre | Won | |
| British Academy Film Awards | Best Actress in a Supporting Role | Whoopi Goldberg | Won | |
| British Academy Film Awards | Best Original Screenplay | Bruce Joel Rubin | Nominated | |
| British Academy Film Awards | Best Make Up Artist | Ben Nye Jr. | Nominated | |
| British Academy Film Awards | Best Special Visual Effects | Bruce Nicholson, John T. Van Vliet, Richard Edlund, and Laura Buff | Nominated | |
| Dallas–Fort Worth Film Critics Association Awards | Best Supporting Actress | Whoopi Goldberg | Won | |
| Golden Globe Awards | Best Motion Picture – Musical or Comedy | | Nominated | |
| Golden Globe Awards | Best Actor in a Motion Picture – Musical or Comedy | Patrick Swayze | Nominated | |
| Golden Globe Awards | Best Actress in a Motion Picture – Musical or Comedy | Demi Moore | Nominated | |
| Golden Globe Awards | Best Supporting Actress – Motion Picture | Whoopi Goldberg | Won | |
| Golden Reel Awards | Outstanding Achievement in Sound Editing – Dialogue and ADR for Feature Film | Lee Haxall | Nominated | |
| Golden Screen Awards | | | Won | |
| Hugo Awards | Best Dramatic Presentation | Jerry Zucker and Bruce Joel Rubin | Nominated | |
| Japan Academy Film Prize | Outstanding Foreign Language Film | | Nominated | |
| Kansas City Film Critics Circle Awards | Best Supporting Actress | Whoopi Goldberg | Won | |
| Mainichi Film Awards | Best Foreign Language Film (Readers' Choice Award) | Jerry Zucker | Won | |
| NAACP Image Awards | Outstanding Supporting Actress in a Motion Picture | Whoopi Goldberg | Won | |
| Nikkan Sports Film Awards | Best Foreign Film | | Won | |
| People's Choice Awards | Favorite Dramatic Motion Picture | | Won | |
| Sant Jordi Awards | Best Foreign Film | Jerry Zucker | Won | |
| Satellite Awards | Best Classic DVD | | Nominated | |
| Saturn Awards | Best Fantasy Film | | Won | |
| Saturn Awards | Best Actor | Patrick Swayze | Nominated | |
| Saturn Awards | Best Actress | Demi Moore | Won | |
| Saturn Awards | Best Supporting Actor | Tony Goldwyn | Nominated | |
| Saturn Awards | Best Supporting Actress | Whoopi Goldberg | Won | |
| Saturn Awards | Best Director | Jerry Zucker | Nominated | |
| Saturn Awards | Best Writing | Bruce Joel Rubin | Nominated | |
| Saturn Awards | Best Music | Maurice Jarre | Nominated | |
| Saturn Awards | Best Special Effects | Bruce Nicholson, John T. Van Vliet, Richard Edlund, and Laura Buff | Nominated | |
| TV Land Awards | Favorite Character from the "Other Side" | Whoopi Goldberg | Nominated | |
| Writers Guild of America Awards | Best Screenplay – Written Directly for the Screen | Bruce Joel Rubin | Nominated | |
| Young Artist Awards | Most Entertaining Family Youth Motion Picture – Comedy/Horror | | Won | |

- In 2002, the film ranked #19 on AFI's 100 Years... 100 Passions.
- In March 2025, feminist art critic Jan Lisa Huttner honored Demi Moore at SWAN Day 2025 events in New York City and Chicago for her performances in Ghost and The Substance, the film which later earned her the Golden Globe Award for Best Actress in a Motion Picture – Musical or Comedy Huttner wrote:
  …when I watched Ghost again, I saw something I wasn’t even looking for in the Wayback: "Molly Jensen" – the character Demi plays in Ghost – is a sculptor preparing for her first public exhibition? What a perfect fit… "Molly Jensen" is now recognized worldwide as one of Demi’s most iconic roles. So high time to celebrate Demi’s courage, resilience, and, yes, persistence.

== Legacy ==
The pottery wheel scene became widely known and has been cited as "one of the most iconic moments of '90s cinema." It has also been parodied frequently, such as in The Naked Gun 2½: The Smell of Fear (of which Jerry Zucker served as an executive producer; it was directed by his brother David Zucker), the short British animated film Wallace and Gromit: A Matter of Loaf and Death and US TV series Two and a Half Men, and Euphoria, in which Rue Bennett (Zendaya) and Jules Vaughn (Hunter Schafer) recreate the scene in the episode "You Who Cannot See, Think of Those Who Can".

The film inspired a musical stage version, Ghost: The Musical. The show had its world premiere in Manchester, UK, in March 2011 before transferring to London from June 2011 and having its premiere on July 19, 2011. On November 13, 2010, Paramount and Shochiku released a Japanese remake of Ghost, titled Ghost: In Your Arms Again (ゴースト もういちど抱きしめたい, Gōsuto Mouichido Dakishimetai). The remake stars Nanako Matsushima, South Korean actor Song Seung-heon, and veteran actress Kirin Kiki. In this film, the ghost is a woman, played by Matsushima.

On January 17, 2023, it was revealed by Vanity Fair that Channing Tatum and his company Free Association acquired the rights to the film from Paramount. Tatum announced plans to produce and star in a remake of the film, with himself cast in Swayze's role.

The 2023 BET+ original film The Reading pays tribute with an Easter egg, naming a minor character Oda M. Brown.

== See also ==
- List of ghost films
