= Lightning Jack =

1994 film directed by Simon Wincer

- Theatrical release poster
- Directed by: Simon Wincer
- Written by: Paul Hogan
- Produced by: Greg Coote; Paul Hogan; Simon Wincer
- Starring: Paul Hogan; Cuba Gooding Jr.; Beverly D'Angelo
- Cinematography: David Eggby
- Edited by: O. Nicholas Brown
- Music by: Bruce Rowland
- Production company: Village Roadshow Pictures
- Distributed by: Savoy Pictures (United States); Roadshow Film Distributors (Australia); Buena Vista International (International)
- Release dates: 11 March 1994 (United States); 31 March 1994 (Australia)
- Running time: 98 minutes
- Countries: United States; Australia
- Language: English
- Box office: $25 million

Lightning Jack is a 1994 Western comedy film written by and starring Paul Hogan, as well as Cuba Gooding Jr. and Beverly D'Angelo.

== Plot ==
Lightning Jack Kane, a long-sighted Australian outlaw in the American west, lives with his horse, Mate. After the rest of his gang is killed in a robbery-gone-wrong, Jack survives only to read of the events in the newspaper that he was nothing next to others. Annoyed at not being recognised as an outlaw, Jack attempts a robbery by himself, and ends up taking young mute Ben Doyle as a hostage. He later discovers that, tired of never having been treated with respect due to his disability and his race, Ben wishes to join him.

Jack attempts to teach Ben how to fire a gun and rob banks, with his first attempt at "on-the-job" training ending with Ben shooting himself in the foot. Across the course of the training, they pay occasional visits to saloons where Jack shows Ben the truth about adult life, including helping him to lose his virginity. However, the true nature of the saloon visits is for Jack to make contact with showgirl Lana Castel, who, unbeknownst to Jack, is madly in love with him.

When Ben's training is complete, the two learn of a bank which is said to have the entire town armed and ready to protect it. Jack sees this as the test he has been waiting for, and together they hatch a plan to rob it. Everything seems to be going smoothly and they are set to begin, until Jack discovers that a rival gang of outlaws is also planning to rob the bank. He is prepared to give up when Ben has a plan of his own.

Ben silently tips off the townspeople, who quickly swarm the bank with the rival outlaws inside. The gang is arrested and the entire town celebrates, allowing Jack and Ben to slip unnoticed into the bank and swiftly strip it clean. Before leaving, Jack jumps into the celebrations, ensuring that his grinning face is seen at the top of the town photo. By the time the true robbery is discovered, the two - and Lana - are gone, with a bounty of thousands on their heads and all of America searching for them - the life that Jack had always wanted.

== Cast ==
- Paul Hogan as Jack 'Lightning Jack' Kane
- Cuba Gooding Jr. as Ben Doyle
- Beverly D'Angelo as Lana Castel
- Kamala Lopez as Pilar
- Pat Hingle as U.S. Marshal Dan Kurtz
- L.Q. Jones as Sheriff Tom
- Richard Riehle as Marcus
- Frank McRae as Doyle
- Roger Daltrey as John T. Coles
- Max Cullen as Bart
- Gus Mercurio as Tough Guy

== Production ==
Paul Hogan wanted to make a classic Western and he was attracted to the idea of making a movie about a bank robber.

Hogan created a company, Lightning Ridge Ltd, which he then floated on the Australian Stock Exchange to help fund the film through investors buying stock. Hogan raised funds this way in order to maintain creative control over the film. The company was delisted in 2001.

Filming took place in Santa Fe, NM; Tucson and Page, AZ; Moab, Utah; and Colorado with some interiors shot at Movie World Studios on the Gold Coast in Australia. Director Simon Wincer says making the film was a logistical nightmare because there were so many other westerns filming on the same locations at the same time, such as Wyatt Earp, Geronimo, City Slickers 2 and Tombstone.

Major League Baseball pitcher Roger Clemens makes an uncredited cameo appearance as the eye-patched outlaw character "Dutch Spencer".

== Reception ==
=== Critical reception ===
Lightning Jack got mostly negative reviews from critics. On Rotten Tomatoes the film has an approval rating of 6% based on reviews from 17 critics.

James Berardinelli rated the film one and a half out of four stars, describing it as a "well-meaning but completely lifeless comedy that is short on humor and long on boredom". He also felt that Hogan "had one story to tell, and, once Crocodile Dundee was made, the wellspring ran dry". Roger Ebert gave the film two out of four stars, writing: "It's impossible to dislike Paul Hogan, and almost as hard to like his movies. They're as goodhearted as they are simple-minded. "Lightning Jack, " his new comic Western, is an example. ... It generates some chuckles, but nothing much more, because the movie's too agreeable and easy-going for its own good."

=== Box office ===
The film opened at number 2 in the United States behind Guarding Tess with an opening weekend gross of $5.4 million but went on to gross less than $17 million in the United States and Canada. It opened over Easter weekend in Australia and was the number one film with a gross of A$1.8 million. It went on to gross A$6.4 million in Australia and $25 million worldwide.

== Year-end lists ==
- Top 18 worst (alphabetically listed, not ranked) – Michael Mills, The Palm Beach Post
- Dishonorable mention – Glenn Lovell, San Jose Mercury News
- Dishonorable mention – Dan Craft, The Pantagraph
- #2 Worst - Michael Medved, Sneak Previews
