= List of 1991 box office number-one films in Australia =

This is a list of films which have placed number one at the weekly box office in Australia during 1991. Amounts are in Australian dollars.

== Number-one films ==
†	This implies the highest-grossing movie of the year.

#	Week ending	Film	Box office	Notes	Ref
1	2 January 1991	Home Alone	$1,881,032		
2	9 January 1991	Kindergarten Cop	$2,486,194		
3	16 January 1991	Kindergarten Cop	$2,068,375		
4	23 January 1991	Look Who's Talking Too	$1,824,594		
5	30 January 1991	Kindergarten Cop	$1,541,532	Kindergarten Cop returned to number one in its fourth week of release	
6	6 February 1991	Green Card	$1,456,109		
7	13 February 1991	Green Card	$1,533,463		
8	20 February 1991	Green Card	$1,375,238		
9	27 February 1991	Green Card	$1,076,081		
10	6 March 1991	Dances with Wolves †	$1,196,451	Dances with Wolves reached number one in its third week of release	
11	13 March 1991	Dances with Wolves †	$1,140,841		
12	20 March 1991	Awakenings	$948,009		
13	27 March 1991	Edward Scissorhands	$1,120,625		
14	3 April 1991	Dances with Wolves †	$2,031,678	Dances with Wolves returned to number one in its seventh week of release	
15	10 April 1991	Dances with Wolves †	$1,283,091		
16	17 April 1991	Dances with Wolves †	$1,094,262		
17	24 April 1991	Dances with Wolves †	$1,027,869		
18	1 May 1991	Dances with Wolves †	$1,041,288		
19	8 May 1991	Dances with Wolves †	$755,565		
20	15 May 1991	The Silence of the Lambs	$1,720,659		
21	22 May 1991	The Silence of the Lambs	$1,625,037		
22	29 May 1991	The Silence of the Lambs	$1,425,975		
23	5 June 1991	The Silence of the Lambs	$1,348,903		
24	12 June 1991	Teenage Mutant Ninja Turtles II: The Secret of the Ooze	$1,639,812		
25	19 June 1991	The Silence of the Lambs	$984,812	The Silence of the Lambs returned to number one in its sixth week of release	
26	26 June 1991	The Silence of the Lambs	$837,662		
27	3 July 1991	Robin Hood: Prince of Thieves	$1,805,447	Robin Hood: Prince of Thieves reached number one in its third week of release	
28	10 July 1991	Robin Hood: Prince of Thieves	$2,048,624		
29	17 July 1991	Robin Hood: Prince of Thieves	$1,884,543		
30	24 July 1991	Robin Hood: Prince of Thieves	$1,393,426		
31	31 July 1991	Robin Hood: Prince of Thieves	$1,083,712		
32	7 August 1991	Robin Hood: Prince of Thieves	$942,747		
33	14 August 1991	Robin Hood: Prince of Thieves	$920,381		
34	21 August 1991	Backdraft	$485,038		
35	28 August 1991	Backdraft	$1,023,836		
36	4 September 1991	City Slickers	$941,127		
37	12 September 1991	Terminator 2: Judgment Day	$3,362,695	Terminator 2: Judgment Day set an opening weekend record of $2,410,617 surpassing the record set by Batman but did not set a record for the week	
38	19 September 1991	Terminator 2: Judgment Day	$2,250,045		
39	26 September 1991	Terminator 2: Judgment Day	$1,646,060		
40	2 October 1991	Terminator 2: Judgment Day	$1,662,687		
41	9 October 1991	Terminator 2: Judgment Day	$1,264,397		
42	16 October 1991	Terminator 2: Judgment Day	$826,961		
43	23 October 1991	Terminator 2: Judgment Day	$555,404		
44	30 October 1991	Terminator 2: Judgment Day	$539,077		
45	6 November 1991	Regarding Henry	$602,155		
46	13 November 1991	The Fisher King	$569,524		
47	20 November 1991	Drop Dead Fred	$752,801		
48	27 November 1991	Drop Dead Fred	$722,614		
49	4 December 1991	Drop Dead Fred	$718,776		
50	11 December 1991	Hot Shots!	$1,305,734		
51	18 December 1991	Hot Shots!	$1,025,491		
52	25 December 1991	Curly Sue	$572,118		

== See also ==
- List of Australian films - Australian films by year
- Lists of box office number-one films

== Chronology ==
Preceded by 1990	1991	Succeeded by 1992
