= List of 1995 box office number-one films in Australia =

This is a list of films which have placed number one at the weekly box office in Australia during 1995. Amounts are in Australian dollars.

== Number-one films ==
| † | This implies the highest-grossing movie of the year. |

| # | Week ending | Film | Box office | Notes | Ref |
|---|---|---|---|---|---|
| 1 | 4 January 1995 | Interview with the Vampire | $3,007,992 | | |
| 2 | 11 January 1995 | The Mask | $2,641,223 | | |
| 3 | 18 January 1995 | Disclosure | $2,400,006 | | |
| 4 | 25 January 1995 | Disclosure | $2,044,808 | | |
| 5 | 1 February 1995 | Terminal Velocity | $1,762,966 | | |
| 6 | 8 February 1995 | Terminal Velocity | $927,255 | | |
| 7 | 15 February 1995 | Nell | $1,290,535 | | |
| 8 | 22 February 1995 | Stargate | $2,980,413 | | |
| 9 | 1 March 1995 | Stargate | $1,762,191 | | |
| 10 | 8 March 1995 | Legends of the Fall | $2,374,046 | | |
| 11 | 15 March 1995 | Legends of the Fall | $1,569,352 | | |
| 12 | 22 March 1995 | Dumb and Dumber | $3,415,694 | | |
| 13 | 29 March 1995 | Dumb and Dumber | $2,271,619 | | |
| 14 | 5 April 1995 | Star Trek Generations | $1,748,640 | | |
| 15 | 12 April 1995 | The Brady Bunch Movie | $870,699 | Weekend only | |
| 16 | 19 April 1995 | Dumb and Dumber | $2,209,645 | Dumb and Dumber returned to number one in its fifth week of release | |
| 17 | 26 April 1995 | Dumb and Dumber | $1,912,233 | | |
| 18 | 3 May 1995 | Bad Boys | $1,421,808 | | |
| 19 | 10 May 1995 | While You Were Sleeping | $1,567,072 | | |
| 20 | 17 May 1995 | While You Were Sleeping | $1,427,871 | | |
| 21 | 24 May 1995 | While You Were Sleeping | $1,148,248 | | |
| 22 | 31 May 1995 | Die Hard with a Vengeance | $3,328,283 | | |
| 23 | 7 June 1995 | Die Hard with a Vengeance | $2,271,691 | | |
| 24 | 14 June 1995 | Die Hard with a Vengeance | $1,965,875 | | |
| 25 | 21 June 1995 | Braveheart | $1,325,428 | Braveheart reached number one in its third week of release | |
| 26 | 28 June 1995 | Casper | $3,200,000 | | |
| 27 | 5 July 1995 | Batman Forever † | $6,454,762 | | |
| 28 | 12 July 1995 | Batman Forever † | $4,828,457 | | |
| 29 | 19 July 1995 | Batman Forever † | $2,727,343 | | |
| 30 | 26 July 1995 | Batman Forever † | $1,341,953 | | |
| 31 | 2 August 1995 | Under Siege 2 | $1,622,997 | | |
| 32 | 9 August 1995 | Species | $2,478,267 | | |
| 33 | 16 August 1995 | Species | $1,333,163 | | |
| 34 | 23 August 1995 | Judge Dredd | $1,429,707 | | |
| 35 | 30 August 1995 | Apollo 13 | $858,793 | 4-day weekend gross | |
| 36 | 6 September 1995 | Apollo 13 | $2,893,068 | | |
| 37 | 13 September 1995 | Apollo 13 | $2,111,147 | | |
| 38 | 20 September 1995 | Waterworld | $2,219,052 | | |
| 39 | 27 September 1995 | Clueless | $1,839,425 | | |
| 40 | 4 October 1995 | Pocahontas | $1,736,643 | Pocahontas reached number one in its sixth week of release | |
| 41 | 11 October 1995 | Dangerous Minds | $1,339,116 | Dangerous Minds reached number one in its second week of release | |
| 42 | 18 October 1995 | The Bridges of Madison County | $988,161 | | |
| 43 | 25 October 1995 | Assassins | $1,419,449 | | |
| 44 | 1 November 1995 | Assassins | $1,029,860 | | |
| 45 | 8 November 1995 | Seven | $2,425,742 | | |
| 46 | 15 November 1995 | Seven | $2,186,359 | | |
| 47 | 19 November 1995 | Seven | $1,324,458 | 5 days only | |
| 48 | 29 November 1995 | Seven | $1,364,463 | | |
| 49 | 6 December 1995 | Ace Ventura: When Nature Calls | $4,155,049 | | |
| 50 | 13 December 1995 | Ace Ventura: When Nature Calls | $2,496,505 | | |
| 51 | 20 December 1995 | Babe | $3,418,960 | | |
| 52 | 27 December 1995 | Babe | $3,537,555 | | |

== Highest-grossing films ==
Highest-grossing films of 1995
| Rank | Title | Distributor | Gross A$ million |
|---|---|---|---|
| 1. | Batman Forever | Warner Bros. | $17,934,344 |
| 2. | Casper | UIP/Universal | $16,856,655 |
| 3. | Dumb and Dumber | Roadshow | $16,455,091 |
| 4. | Forrest Gump | UIP/Paramount | $13,246,189 |
| 5. | Apollo 13 | UIP/Universal | $12,448,615 |
| 6. | Die Hard with a Vengeance | Roadshow | $12,050,360 |
| 7. | Braveheart | Fox | $11,930,986 |
| 8. | Babe | UIP/Universal | $10,972,358 |
| 9. | While You Were Sleeping | Hollywood | $10,737,584 |
| 10. | Ace Ventura: When Nature Calls | Roadshow | $10,462,699 |

== See also ==
- List of Australian films - Australian films by year
- Lists of box office number-one films

| Preceded by 1994 | 1995 |
