= List of 1994 box office number-one films in Australia =

This is a list of films which have placed number one at the weekly box office in Australia during 1994. Amounts are in Australian dollars.

== Number-one films ==
†	This implies the highest-grossing movie of the year.

#	Week ending	Film	Box office	Notes	Ref
1	5 January 1994	Mrs. Doubtfire	$3,889,154		
2	12 January 1994	Mrs. Doubtfire	$3,515,732		
3	19 January 1994	Mrs. Doubtfire	$2,983,120		
4	26 January 1994	Mrs. Doubtfire	$2,447,549		
5	2 February 1994	Mrs. Doubtfire	$1,762,966		
6	9 February 1994	Mrs. Doubtfire	$1,187,509		
7	16 February 1994	Mrs. Doubtfire	$1,128,736		
8	23 February 1994	The Good Son	$1,073,372		
9	2 March 1994	Schindler's List	$914,472	Schindler's List reached number one in its third week of release	
10	9 March 1994	Cool Runnings	$1,465,439		
11	16 March 1994	The Pelican Brief	$1,925,788		
12	23 March 1994	The Pelican Brief	$1,220,771		
13	30 March 1994	Cool Runnings	$790,917	Weekend only. Cool Runnings returned to number one in its fourth week of release	
14	6 April 1994	Lightning Jack	$2,478,579		
15	13 April 1994	Lightning Jack	$1,605,927		
16	20 April 1994	Cool Runnings	$1,015,655	Cool Runnings returned to number one in its seventh week of release	
17	27 April 1994	Intersection	$1,094,117		
18	4 May 1994	Ace Ventura: Pet Detective	$952,379		
19	11 May 1994	Four Weddings and a Funeral	$2,248,063		
20	18 May 1994	Four Weddings and a Funeral	$2,531,944		
21	25 May 1994	Four Weddings and a Funeral	$2,208,927		
22	1 June 1994	Four Weddings and a Funeral	$1,844,055		
23	8 June 1994	Four Weddings and a Funeral	$1,694,877		
24	15 June 1994	Maverick	$2,695,922	Maverick reached number one in its fourth week of release	
25	22 June 1994	Maverick	$1,769,489		
26	29 June 1994	Maverick	$1,200,000		
27	6 July 1994	Speed	$2,886,463		
28	13 July 1994	Speed	$2,779,920		
29	20 July 1994	Speed	$2,287,785		
30	27 July 1994	Speed	$1,782,506		
31	3 August 1994	Speed	$1,494,312		
32	10 August 1994	Speed	$1,114,272		
33	17 August 1994	Speed	$930,195		
34	24 August 1994	Speed	$833,139		
35	31 August 1994	The Lion King †	$3,044,806		
36	7 September 1994	The Lion King †	$3,252,523		
37	14 September 1994	The Lion King †	$2,737,079		
38	21 September 1994	The Flintstones	$4,343,408		
39	28 September 1994	The Flintstones	$4,325,056		
40	5 October 1994	The Lion King †	$3,309,175	The Lion King returned to number one in its sixth week of release	
41	12 October 1994	Clear and Present Danger	$2,100,591		
42	19 October 1994	Muriel's Wedding	$1,622,900	Muriel's Wedding reached number one in its third week of release	
43	26 October 1994	The Specialist	$1,683,953		
44	2 November 1994	Muriel's Wedding	$1,385,772	Muriel's Wedding returned to number one in its fifth week of release	
45	9 November 1994	Muriel's Wedding	$1,467,315		
46	16 November 1994	Muriel's Wedding	$1,213,287		
47	23 November 1994	Forrest Gump	$4,594,391		
48	30 November 1994	Forrest Gump	$3,320,313		
49	7 December 1994	Forrest Gump	$2,531,161		
50	14 December 1994	The Mask	$3,928,864		
51	21 December 1994	The Mask	TBD		
52	28 December 1994	Interview with the Vampire	TBD	Interview with the Vampire grossed $5 million in its first 10 days	

== Highest-grossing films ==
Highest-grossing films of 1994
Rank	Title	Distributor	Gross A$ million
1.	The Lion King	Disney/Roadshow	$24,647,222
2.	Four Weddings and a Funeral	REP	$21,471,077
3.	Mrs. Doubtfire	Fox	$20,525,035
4.	Speed	Fox	$17,882,442
5.	Forrest Gump	Paramount/UIP	$16,329,786
6.	The Flintstones	Universal/UIP	$14,941,101
7.	The Adventures of Priscilla, Queen of the Desert	Roadshow	$14,760,104
8.	Muriel's Wedding	Roadshow	$13,954,530
9.	Cool Runnings	Disney/Roadshow	$13,385,021
10.	True Lies	Fox/UIP	$13,199,718

== See also ==
- List of Australian films - Australian films by year
- Lists of box office number-one films

== Chronology ==
Preceded by 1993	1994	Succeeded by 1995
