= List of 1993 box office number-one films in Australia =

This is a list of films which have placed number one at the weekly box office in Australia during 1993. Amounts are in Australian dollars.

== Number-one films ==
†	This implies the highest-grossing movie of the year.

#	Week ending	Film	Box office	Notes	Ref
1	6 January 1993	Bram Stoker's Dracula	$3,215,030		
2	13 January 1993	Bram Stoker's Dracula	$1,908,042		
3	20 January 1993	The Bodyguard	$4,367,344	The Bodyguard set an opening week record surpassing that set by Crocodile Dundee II	
4	27 January 1993	The Bodyguard	$3,398,125		
5	3 February 1993	The Bodyguard	$2,095,084		
6	10 February 1993	The Bodyguard	$1,417,604		
7	17 February 1993	Unforgiven	$1,252,793		
8	24 February 1993	Unforgiven	$1,135,157		
9	3 March 1993	Unforgiven	$812,263		
10	10 March 1993	The Last of the Mohicans	$1,214,246		
11	17 March 1993	The Last of the Mohicans	$859,657		
12	24 March 1993	Scent of a Woman	$747,832	Scent of a Woman reached number one in its second week of release	
13	31 March 1993	Forever Young	$1,381,503		
14	7 April 1993	Loaded Weapon 1	$1,145,122		
15	14 April 1993	Reckless Kelly	$2,034,810		
16	21 April 1993	Reckless Kelly	$1,629,188		
17	28 April 1993	Indecent Proposal	$1,157,997	3-day previews	
18	5 May 1993	Indecent Proposal	$2,435,465		
19	12 May 1993	Indecent Proposal	$1,598,720		
20	19 May 1993	Indecent Proposal	$1,270,913		
21	26 May 1993	Indecent Proposal	$1,021,323		
22	2 June 1993	Falling Down	$1,274,144		
23	9 June 1993	Aladdin	$1,783,182		
24	16 June 1993	Aladdin	$2,243,924		
25	23 June 1993	Aladdin	$1,628,695		
26	30 June 1993	Aladdin	$2,147,251		
27	7 July 1993	Aladdin	$2,711,330		
28	14 July 1993	Cliffhanger	$2,736,228	Cliffhanger reached number one in its second week of release	
29	21 July 1993	Cliffhanger	$1,923,934		
30	28 July 1993	The Firm	$2,610,466		
31	4 August 1993	The Firm	$1,904,932		
32	11 August 1993	Sleepless in Seattle	$1,386,671		
33	18 August 1993	The Fugitive	$1,853,879		
34	25 August 1993	The Fugitive	$1,766,005		
35	1 September 1993	The Fugitive	$1,617,935		
36	8 September 1993	Jurassic Park †	$6,807,969	Jurassic Park broke the opening weekend record set by Terminator 2: Judgment Day with a 4-day gross of $5,447,000 and the weekly record set earlier in the year by The Bodyguard	
37	15 September 1993	Jurassic Park †	$5,450,377		
38	22 September 1993	Jurassic Park †	$4,688,860		
39	29 September 1993	Jurassic Park †	$4,325,060		
40	6 October 1993	Jurassic Park †	$3,773,095		
41	13 October 1993	Jurassic Park †	$1,826,378		
42	20 October 1993	Jurassic Park †	$1,167,136		
43	27 October 1993	In the Line of Fire	$858,747	In the Line of Fire reached number one in its third week of release	
44	3 November 1993	Rising Sun	$1,237,615		
45	10 November 1993	Rising Sun	$827,292		
46	17 November 1993	Point of No Return	$950,435		
47	24 November 1993	Malice	$770,150		
48	1 December 1993	Addams Family Values	$1,137,024		
49	8 December 1993	Demolition Man	$1,695,480		
50	15 December 1993	Demolition Man	$1,067,391		
51	22 December 1993	Mrs. Doubtfire	$2,400,000		
52	29 December 1993	Mrs. Doubtfire	$3,286,073		

== Highest-grossing films ==
Highest-grossing films of 1993 by calendar gross
Rank	Title	Distributor	Gross (A$)
1.	Jurassic Park	UIP/Universal	$31,745,057
2.	The Bodyguard	Warner Bros.	$18,260,412
3.	Aladdin	Disney	$17,639,062
4.	Sister Act	Touchstone Pictures	$13,609,732
5.	The Fugitive	Warner Bros.	$11,700,288
6.	Cliffhanger	TriStar	$10,452,392
7.	Sleepless in Seattle	Tristar	$10,449,702
8.	Indecent Proposal	UIP/Paramount	$10,321,517
9.	The Piano	Miramax/Disney	$9,209,898
10.	The Firm	UIP/Paramount	$8,682,262

== See also ==
- List of Australian films - Australian films by year
- Lists of box office number-one films

== Chronology ==
Preceded by 1992	1993	Succeeded by 1994
