= List of 1992 box office number-one films in Australia =

This is a list of films which have placed number one at the weekly box office in Australia during 1992. Amounts are in Australian dollars.

== Number-one films ==
| † | This implies the highest-grossing movie of the year. |

| # | Week ending | Film | Box office | Notes | Ref |
|---|---|---|---|---|---|
| 1 | 1 January 1992 | The Addams Family | $2,372,558 | | |
| 2 | 8 January 1992 | Point Break | $1,866,158 | | |
| 3 | 15 January 1992 | Point Break | $1,416,234 | | |
| 4 | 22 January 1992 | Cape Fear | $1,150,676 | Cape Fear reached number one in its second week of release | |
| 5 | 29 January 1992 | JFK | $1,311,015 | | |
| 6 | 5 February 1992 | JFK | $1,057,036 | | |
| 7 | 12 February 1992 | JFK | $939,760 | | |
| 8 | 19 February 1992 | JFK | $783,470 | | |
| 9 | 26 February 1992 | JFK | $750,409 | | |
| 10 | 4 March 1992 | The Prince of Tides | $947,384 | | |
| 11 | 11 March 1992 | Medicine Man | $741,104 | | |
| 12 | 18 March 1992 | Medicine Man | $596,676 | | |
| 13 | 25 March 1992 | Medicine Man | $524,754 | | |
| 14 | 1 April 1992 | Hook | $2,114,735 | | |
| 15 | 8 April 1992 | Hook | $1,593,249 | | |
| 16 | 15 April 1992 | Hook | $812,275 | Weekend only figures | |
| 17 | 22 April 1992 | Hook | $2,296,334 | | |
| 18 | 29 April 1992 | Hook | $1,470,017 | | |
| 19 | 6 May 1992 | Hook | $593,268 | | |
| 20 | 13 May 1992 | The Lawnmower Man | $699,155 | The Lawnmower Man reached number one in its second week of release | |
| 21 | 20 May 1992 | Basic Instinct | $2,225,942 | | |
| 22 | 27 May 1992 | Basic Instinct | $1,897,712 | | |
| 23 | 3 June 1992 | Basic Instinct | $1,499,245 | | |
| 24 | 10 June 1992 | Alien 3 | $2,272,712 | | |
| 25 | 17 June 1992 | Far and Away | $1,089,544 | Far and Away reached number one in its second week of release | |
| 26 | 24 June 1992 | Batman Returns | $2,718,339 | | |
| 27 | 1 July 1992 | Batman Returns | $1,849,251 | | |
| 28 | 8 July 1992 | Wayne's World | $2,011,896 | | |
| 29 | 15 July 1992 | Beauty and the Beast | $2,223,605 | Beauty and the Beast reached number one in its fifth week of release | |
| 30 | 22 July 1992 | Wayne's World | $1,379,707 | Wayne's World returned to number one in its third week of release | |
| 31 | 29 July 1992 | Wayne's World | $712,814 | | |
| 32 | 5 August 1992 | Housesitter | $1,501,496 | Housesitter reached number one in its second week of release | |
| 33 | 12 August 1992 | White Men Can't Jump | $1,320,456 | White Men Can't Jump reached number one in its second week of release | |
| 34 | 19 August 1992 | Patriot Games | $1,590,544 | | |
| 35 | 26 August 1992 | Patriot Games | $1,237,688 | | |
| 36 | 2 September 1992 | Strictly Ballroom † | $1,307,825 | Strictly Ballroom reached number one in its second week of release | |
| 37 | 9 September 1992 | Lethal Weapon 3 | $2,787,661 | | |
| 38 | 16 September 1992 | Lethal Weapon 3 | $1,827,829 | | |
| 39 | 23 September 1992 | Lethal Weapon 3 | $882,085 | | |
| 40 | 30 September 1992 | Strictly Ballroom † | $1,625,087 | Strictly Ballroom returned to number one in its sixth week of release | |
| 41 | 7 October 1992 | Strictly Ballroom † | $1,747,800 | | |
| 42 | 14 October 1992 | Strictly Ballroom † | $1,403,525 | | |
| 43 | 21 October 1992 | Strictly Ballroom † | $1,355,699 | | |
| 44 | 28 October 1992 | Strictly Ballroom † | $1,134,176 | | |
| 45 | 4 November 1992 | Strictly Ballroom † | $1,008,516 | | |
| 46 | 11 November 1992 | Strictly Ballroom † | $803,052 | | |
| 47 | 18 November 1992 | Romper Stomper | $819,736 | | |
| 48 | 25 November 1992 | Sister Act | $2,368,709 | | |
| 49 | 2 December 1992 | Sister Act | $1,757,961 | | |
| 50 | 9 December 1992 | Sister Act | $1,518,632 | | |
| 51 | 16 December 1992 | Home Alone 2: Lost in New York | $1,899,988 | | |
| 52 | 23 December 1992 | Home Alone 2: Lost in New York | $1,867,651 | | |
| 53 | 30 December 1992 | Home Alone 2: Lost in New York | $2,193,259 | | |

== Highest-grossing films ==
Highest-grossing films of 1992
| Rank | Title | Distributor | Gross (A$) |
|---|---|---|---|
| 1. | Strictly Ballroom | Ronin | $18,732,864 |
| 2. | Basic Instinct | Roadshow Entertainment | $13,136,547 |
| 3. | Hook | TriStar Pictures | $11,805,836 |
| 4. | Lethal Weapon 3 | Warner Bros. | $11,651,169 |
| 5. | Beauty and the Beast | Disney | $10,341,346 |
| 6. | Batman Returns | Warner Bros. | $9,650,530 |
| 7. | Sister Act | Touchstone Pictures | $9,169,448 |
| 8. | Wayne's World | UIP/Paramount | $9,093,163 |
| 9. | Father of the Bride | Touchstone | $8,806,083 |
| 10. | Cape Fear | UIP/Universal | $8,099,839 |

== See also ==
- List of Australian films - Australian films by year
- Lists of box office number-one films

== Chronology ==
| Preceded by 1991 | 1992 | Succeeded by 1993 |
