= List of 2024 box office number-one films in Australia =

The following is a list of 2024 box office number-one films in Australia by weekend.

== Number-one films ==
This is a list of films which have placed number one at the box office in Australia during 2024.

| † | This implies the highest-grossing movie of the year. |

| # | Weekend end date | Film | Weekend gross |
|---|---|---|---|
| 1 | 7 January 2024 | Wonka | US$2,237,661 |
| 2 | 14 January 2024 | Mean Girls | US$1,858,052 |
| 3 | 21 January 2024 | Anyone but You | US$1,118,921 |
| 4 | 28 January 2024 | Anyone but You | US$996,142 |
| 5 | 4 February 2024 | Argylle | US$1,600,000 |
| 6 | 11 February 2024 | Force of Nature: The Dry 2 | US$1,065,412 |
| 7 | 18 February 2024 | Bob Marley: One Love | US$1,332,737 |
| 8 | 25 February 2024 | Bob Marley: One Love | US$841,935 |
| 9 | 3 March 2024 | Dune: Part Two | US$5,607,631 |
| 10 | 10 March 2024 | Dune: Part Two | US$4,046,079 |
| 11 | 17 March 2024 | Dune: Part Two | US$2,612,411 |
| 12 | 24 March 2024 | Ghostbusters: Frozen Empire | US$1,956,681 |
| 13 | 31 March 2024 | Godzilla x Kong: The New Empire | US$3,649,963 |
| 14 | 7 April 2024 | Kung Fu Panda 4 | US$2,418,073 |
| 15 | 14 April 2024 | Kung Fu Panda 4 | US$1,736,230 |
| 16 | 21 April 2024 | Kung Fu Panda 4 | US$1,289,655 |
| 17 | 28 April 2024 | The Fall Guy | US$2,415,135 |
| 18 | 5 May 2024 | The Fall Guy | US$1,627,030 |
| 19 | 12 May 2024 | Kingdom of the Planet of the Apes | US$2,653,361 |
| 20 | 19 May 2024 | Kingdom of the Planet of the Apes | US$1,646,799 |
| 21 | 26 May 2024 | Furiosa: A Mad Max Saga | US$2,207,008 |
| 22 | 2 June 2024 | The Garfield Movie | US$1,973,099 |
| 23 | 9 June 2024 | Bad Boys: Ride or Die | US$2,771,824 |
| 24 | 16 June 2024 | Inside Out 2 | US$6,056,462 |
| 25 | 23 June 2024 | Inside Out 2 | US$4,956,611 |
| 26 | 30 June 2024 | Inside Out 2 | US$3,972,377 |
| 27 | 7 July 2024 | Inside Out 2 | US$4,039,683 |
| 28 | 14 July 2024 | Despicable Me 4 | US$3,305,660 |
| 29 | 21 July 2024 | Despicable Me 4 | US$2,011,358 |
| 30 | 28 July 2024 | Deadpool & Wolverine † | US$11,522,650 |
| 31 | 4 August 2024 | Deadpool & Wolverine † | US$8,267,054 |
| 32 | 11 August 2024 | Deadpool & Wolverine † | US$4,920,584 |
| 33 | 18 August 2024 | Deadpool & Wolverine † | US$3,044,014 |
| 34 | 25 August 2024 | Deadpool & Wolverine † | US$2,008,030 |
| 35 | 1 September 2024 | Deadpool & Wolverine † | US$1,543,158 |
| 36 | 8 September 2024 | Beetlejuice Beetlejuice | US$2,600,000 |
| 37 | 15 September 2024 | Beetlejuice Beetlejuice | US$1,625,235 |
| 38 | 22 September 2024 | The Wild Robot | US$1,154,735 |
| 39 | 29 September 2024 | The Wild Robot | US$1,698,634 |
| 40 | 6 October 2024 | Joker: Folie à Deux | US$2,923,921 |
| 41 | 13 October 2024 | The Wild Robot | US$978,949 |
| 42 | 20 October 2024 | Smile 2 | US$1,273,245 |
| 43 | 27 October 2024 | Venom: The Last Dance | US$3,120,757 |
| 44 | 3 November 2024 | Venom: The Last Dance | US$3,120,757 |
| 45 | 10 November 2024 | Red One | US$1,400,000 |
| 46 | 17 November 2024 | Gladiator II | US$4,492,445 |
| 47 | 24 November 2024 | Wicked | US$5,819,482 |
| 48 | 1 December 2024 | Moana 2 | US$8,021,950 |
| 49 | 8 December 2024 | Moana 2 | US$4,467,106 |
| 50 | 15 December 2024 | Moana 2 | US$2,809,939 |
| 51 | 22 December 2024 | Mufasa: The Lion King | US$2,810,126 |
| 52 | 29 December 2024 | Sonic the Hedgehog 3 | US$4,317,939 |

== Highest-grossing films ==
=== In-year releases ===
Highest-grossing films of 2024
| Rank | Title | Distributor | Aus gross US$ | Aus gross AU$ |
|---|---|---|---|---|
| 1 | Deadpool & Wolverine | Walt Disney Pictures | $44,736,809 | |
| 2 | Inside Out 2 | Walt Disney Pictures | $34,833,863 | |
| 3 | Moana 2 | Walt Disney Pictures | $32,650,105 | |
| 4 | Wicked | Universal Pictures International | $30,690,041 | |
| 5 | Despicable Me 4 | Universal Pictures International | $28,922,999 | |

== See also ==
- List of Australian films of 2024
- 2024 in film
- List of 2025 box office number-one films in Australia

| Preceded by 2023 Box office number-one films | Box office number-one films 2024 | Succeeded by 2025 Box office number-one films |
