= List of 2022 box office number-one films in Australia =

This is a list of films which have placed number one at the box office in Australia during 2022.

== Number-one films ==
†	This implies the highest-grossing movie of the year.

#	Weekend end date	Film	Weekend gross	Top 10 openings
1	2 January 2022	Spider-Man: No Way Home	US$4,418,886	Ghostbusters: Afterlife (#3), House of Gucci (#5)
2	9 January 2022	Spider-Man: No Way Home	US$2,882,883	The King's Man (#4), The Addams Family 2 (#6)
3	16 January 2022	Spider-Man: No Way Home	US$1,955,229	King Richard (#6), The 355 (#9)
4	23 January 2022	Spider-Man: No Way Home	US$1,545,545	Nightmare Alley (#6), Spencer (#8)
5	30 January 2022	Spider-Man: No Way Home	US$1,162,815	
6	6 February 2022	Jackass Forever	US$1,753,244	Moonfall (#3), Belfast (#4)
7	13 February 2022	Death on the Nile	US$1,177,585	Marry Me (#2), Blacklight (#5)
8	20 February 2022	Uncharted	US$4,038,904	
9	27 February 2022	Uncharted	US$3,032,561	Gangubai Kathiawadi (#7), Bheemla Nayak (#9), Studio 666 (#10)
10	6 March 2022	The Batman	US$8,504,634	Monster Family 2 (#5)
11	13 March 2022	The Batman	US$5,284,095	Radhe Shyam (#3), Off the Rails (#7)
12	20 March 2022	The Batman	US$3,075,543	Dog (#2), Jujutsu Kaisen 0 (#3), Bachchhan Paandey (#9)
13	27 March 2022	The Batman	US$2,153,480	RRR (#2), X (#6)
14	3 April 2022	Sonic the Hedgehog 2	US$2,800,000	Morbius (#2), The Bad Guys (#3), The Duke (#5)
15	10 April 2022	Fantastic Beasts: The Secrets of Dumbledore	US$3,906,720	Ambulance (#5), Rabbit Academy (#9), Galwakdi (#10)
16	17 April 2022	Fantastic Beasts: The Secrets of Dumbledore	US$2,409,968	K.G.F: Chapter 2 (#3), Everything Everywhere All at Once (#4), Beast (#7)
17	24 April 2022	Fantastic Beasts: The Secrets of Dumbledore	US$1,649,625	The Northman (#3), The Unbearable Weight of Massive Talent (#4)
18	1 May 2022	Downton Abbey: A New Era	US$1,339,894	Acharya (#7), Kaathuvaakula Rendu Kaadhal (#10)
19	8 May 2022	Doctor Strange in the Multiverse of Madness	US$10,278,105	The Drover's Wife (#7), Maa (#8)
20	15 May 2022	Doctor Strange in the Multiverse of Madness	US$5,090,050	Operation Mincemeat (#3), Sarkaru Vaari Paata (#8), Firestarter (#10)
21	22 May 2022	Doctor Strange in the Multiverse of Madness	US$2,729,177	How to Please a Woman (#3), Last Seen Alive (#4), Bhool Bhulaiyaa 2 (#8)
22	29 May 2022	Top Gun: Maverick †	US$12,992,111	The Bob's Burgers Movie (#3), F3 (#8)
23	5 June 2022	Top Gun: Maverick †	US$9,300,000	Vikram (#3), Major (#10)
24	12 June 2022	Jurassic World Dominion	US$8,540,281	Ante Sundaraniki (#8)
25	19 June 2022	Jurassic World Dominion	US$4,811,357	Lightyear (#3)
26	26 June 2022	Elvis	US$4,678,888	Minions: The Rise of Gru (#2), Jugjugg Jeeyo (#6), Freedom Uncut (#9), Sher Bagga (#10)
27	3 July 2022	Minions: The Rise of Gru	US$5,567,454	The Roundup (#6), Rocketry: The Nambi Effect (#9)
28	10 July 2022	Thor: Love and Thunder	US$10,807,108	Shareek 2 (#7)
29	17 July 2022	Thor: Love and Thunder	US$4,860,515	Falling for Figaro (#7), The Phantom of the Open (#8), Bajre Da Sitta (#9), Kaduva (#10)
30	24 July 2022	Thor: Love and Thunder	US$2,457,360	Where the Crawdads Sing (#2), The Black Phone (#5), Shamshera (#8)
31	31 July 2022	Thor: Love and Thunder	US$1,498,151	Chhalla Mud Ke Nahi Aya (#7), Lee Kernaghan Boy From The Bush (#9)
32	7 August 2022	Bullet Train	US$2,182,191	Sita Ramam (#9)
33	14 August 2022	Bullet Train	US$1,293,891	Nope (#2), Laal Singh Chaddha (#5)
34	21 August 2022	Bullet Train	US$899,665	Dragon Ball Super: Super Hero (#3), Good Luck to You, Leo Grande (#5)
35	28 August 2022	Nope	US$351,687	Beast (#2)
36	4 September 2022	Bullet Train	US$601,739	Orphan: First Kill (#2), Three Thousand Years of Longing (#3)
37	11 September 2022	Brahmastra Part 1: Shiva	US$618,267	After Ever Happy (#2)
38	18 September 2022	Ticket to Paradise	US$2,041,598	DC League of Super-Pets (#2), Moonage Daydream (#3), Bodies Bodies Bodies (#8)
39	25 September 2022	Ticket to Paradise	US$1,875,801	Fall (#4), Paws of Fury: The Legend of Hank (#5)
40	2 October 2022	DC League of Super-Pets	US$1,782,265	Smile (#3), Ponniyin Selvan: I (#4), See How They Run (#5), Vikram Vedha (#9)
41	9 October 2022	Don't Worry Darling	US$1,359,226	Amsterdam (#4), Wog Boys Forever (#5), Babe Bhangra Paunde Ne (#9)
42	16 October 2022	Halloween Ends	US$905,431	The Legend of Maula Jatt (#7)
43	23 October 2022	Black Adam	US$4,764,010	Barbarian (#6)
44	30 October 2022	Black Adam	US$2,272,984	Mrs. Harris Goes to Paris (#2), The Woman King (#3), Bros (#5), Terrifier 2 (#7), Coldplay: Music of the Spheres: Live Broadcast from Buenos Aires (#10)
45	6 November 2022	Black Adam	US$1,451,583	One Piece Film: Red (#3)
46	13 November 2022	Black Panther: Wakanda Forever	US$6,277,374	
47	20 November 2022	Black Panther: Wakanda Forever	US$3,718,677	She Said (#4), Drishyam 2 (#5), On The Line (#6)
48	27 November 2022	Black Panther: Wakanda Forever	US$1,896,627	The Menu (#2), Strange World (#3), Bones and All (#7), Seriously Red (#8), Bhediya (#10)
49	4 December 2022	Black Panther: Wakanda Forever	US$1,241,304	Violent Night (#3), HIT: The Second Case (#8)
50	11 December 2022	Black Panther: Wakanda Forever	US$880,604	Tad, the Lost Explorer and the Emerald Tablet (#9)
51	18 December 2022	Avatar: The Way of Water	US$9,855,736	
52	25 December 2022	Avatar: The Way of Water	US$4,812,746	Cirkus (#5), Dhamaka (#10)

== Highest-grossing films ==
=== In-year releases ===
Highest-grossing films of 2022
Rank	Title	Distributor	Domestic gross US$
1	Top Gun: Maverick	Paramount	$65,442,577
2	Avatar: The Way of Water	Disney	$63,738,374
3	Thor: Love and Thunder	Disney	$30,349,009
4	Minions: The Rise of Gru	Universal	$29,877,350
5	Doctor Strange in the Multiverse of Madness	Disney	$26,929,688
6	The Batman	Warner Bros.	$25,132,485
7	Jurassic World Dominion	Universal	$24,904,932
8	Elvis	Warner Bros.	$23,029,865
9	Black Panther: Wakanda Forever	Disney	$20,192,782
10	Sonic the Hedgehog 2	Paramount	$15,181,152

Highest-grossing films by ACB rating of 2022
G	TBD
PG	Minions: The Rise of Gru
M	Top Gun: Maverick
MA 15+	Bullet Train
R 18+	TBD

== See also ==
- List of Australian films of 2022
- 2022 in film
- List of 2023 box office number-one films in Australia

Preceded by 2021 Box office number-one films	Box office number-one films 2022	Succeeded by 2023 Box office number-one films
