= List of Australian films of 2023 =

The following is a list of Australian films released in 2023.

== Films ==
Opening		Title	Director	Cast	Genre	Ref
J A N U A R Y	1	Blueback	Robert Connolly	Mia Wasikowska, Radha Mitchell, Eric Bana	Drama	
J A N U A R Y	13	After She Died	Jack Dignan	Liliana de la Rosa, Vanessa Madrid, Paul Talbot, Barbara Bingham, Greg Poppleton	Horror	
J A N U A R Y	26	True Spirit	Sarah Spillane	Teagan Croft, Cliff Curtis, Anna Paquin	Biopic	
M A R	23	Of an Age	Goran Stolevski	Elias Anton, Thom Green, Hattie Hook	Romance drama	
A P R I L	7	The Portable Door	Jeffrey Walker	Christoph Waltz, Sam Neill, Patrick Gibson, Sophie Wilde, Miranda Otto	Fantasy	
M A Y	18	Limbo	Ivan Sen	Simon Baker, Rob Collins, Natasha Wanganeen, Nicholas Hope	Mystery-crime	
J U N E	11	Birdeater	Jack Clark, Jim Weir	Mackenzie Fearnley, Shabana Azeez, Ben Hunter, Jack Bannister, Clementine Anderson	Horror	
J U N E	28	Run Rabbit Run	Daina Reid	Sarah Snook, Lily LaTorre, Damon Herriman, Greta Scacchi	Psychological horror	
J U L Y	6	The New Boy	Warwick Thornton	Aswan Reid, Deborah Mailman, Wayne Blair, Cate Blanchett	Drama	
J U L Y	26	The Appleton Ladies' Potato Race	Lynn Hegarty	Claire van der Boom, Katie Wall, Genevieve Lemon, Robyn Nevin, Olivia Stamboulia	Drama	
A U G U S T	10	Ego: The Michael Gudinski Story	Paul Goldman	Michael Gudinski	Documentary	
S E P T E M B E R	28	Love Is in the Air	Adrian Powers	Delta Goodrem, Joshua Sasse, Steph Tisdell, Roy Billing	Romantic comedy	
O C T O B E R	5	Shayda	Noora Niasari	Zar Amir Ebrahimi, Osamah Sami, Leah Purcell	Drama	
O C T O B E R	21	Emotion Is Dead	Pete Williams	Tatiana Goode, Adam Tuominen, Jude Turner, Brad McCarthy, Gabby Llewelyn, Jaya Suartika, Isi Sweeney	Drama	
N O V E M B E R	2	Bring Him to Me	Luke Sparke	Barry Pepper, Jamie Costa, Liam McIntyre, Rachel Griffiths, Sam Neill	Crime-thriller	
N O V E M B E R	16	A Savage Christmas	Madeleine Dyer	Darren Gilshenan, Helen Thomson, Ryan Morgan, David Roberts, Thea Raveneau, Max Jahufer, Rekha Ryan, Gary Sweet	Comedy	
N O V E M B E R	30	Christmess	Heath Davis	Hannah Joy, Steve Le Marquand, Darren Gilshenan, Aaron Glenane, Nicole Pastor	Comedy drama	

== See also ==
- Love Road
- 2023 in Australia
- 2023 in Australian television
- List of 2023 box office number-one films in Australia
