= List of Australian films of 2024 =

The following is a list of Australian films that have been released in 2024.

== Films ==
Opening		Title	Director	Cast	Genre	Ref
J A N U A R Y	21	The Moogai	Jon Bell	Shari Sebbens, Meyne Wyatt, Tessa Rose, Clarence Ryan, Toby Leonard Moore, Bella Heathcote	Horror	
F E B R U A R Y	8	Force of Nature: The Dry 2	Robert Connolly	Eric Bana, Anna Torv, Deborra-Lee Furness, Robin McLeavy, Jacqueline McKenzie, Tony Briggs, Jeremy Lindsay Taylor, Richard Roxburgh	Mystery–thriller	
F E B R U A R Y	13	Five Blind Dates	Shawn Seet	Shuang Hu, Ilai Swindells, Tiffany Wong, Renee Lim, Tzi Ma, Jon Prasida, Yoson An, Desmond Chiam, Rob Collins	Romantic comedy	
F E B R U A R Y	29	Combat Wombat: Back 2 Back	Ricard Cussó, Tania Vincent	Deborah Mailman, Ed Oxenbould, David Wenham, Elizabeth Cullen, Mark Coles Smith	Children's	
M A R	13	Windcatcher	Tanith Glynn-Maloney	Lennox Monaghan, Jessica Mauboy, Max Turner, Coco Greenstone, Kelton Pell, Pia Miranda, Ngali Shaw, Jessica McNamee, Lisa Maza	Drama	
M A R	14	You'll Never Find Me	Indianna Bell, Josiah Allen	Brendan Rock, Jordan Cowan	Horror	
A P R I L	11	Late Night with the Devil	Colin and Cameron Cairnes	David Dastmalchian, Laura Gordon, Ian Bliss, Fayssal Bazzi, Ingrid Torelli, Rhys Auteri, Georgina Haig, Josh Quong Tart	Horror	
A P R I L	17	Sting	Kiah Roache-Turner	Ryan Corr, Alyla Browne, Penelope Mitchell, Robyn Nevin, Noni Hazelhurst, Silvia Colloca, Danny Kim, Jermaine Fowler	Horror	
M A Y	18	The Surfer	Lorcan Finnegan	Nicolas Cage, Julian McMahon, Nicholas Cassim, Miranda Tapsell, Alexander Bertrand, Justin Rosniak, Rahel Romahn, Finn Little, Charlotte Maggi	Psychological thriller	
M A Y	23	Furiosa: A Mad Max Saga	George Miller	Anya Taylor-Joy, Chris Hemsworth, Alyla Browne, Tom Burke	Post-apocalyptic, Action adventure	
J U N E	11	Kid Snow	Paul Goldman	Billy Howle, Phoebe Tonkin, Tom Bateman, Tasma Walton, Nathan Phillips, Hunter Page-Lochard, Anthony Sharpe	Sports drama	
J U L Y	25	The Sloth Lane	Ricard Cussó, Tania Vincent	Leslie Jones, Teo Vergara, Olivia Vásquez, Ben Gorroño, Facundo Herrera, Remy Hii, Matteo Romaniuk, Dan Brumm	Children's	
S E P T E M B E R	12	Runt	John Sheedy	Jai Courtney, Lily LaTorre, Celeste Barber, Deborah Mailman, Jack Thompson, Genevieve Lemon, Matt Day, Jack LaTorre	Children's	
S E P T E M B E R	15	The Deb	Rebel Wilson	Natalie Abbott, Charlotte MacInnes, Stevie Jean, Tara Morice, Steph Tisdell, Costa D'Angelo, Hal Cumpston, Julian McMahon, Shane Jacobson	Comedy, musical	
O C T O B E R	17	Memoir of a Snail	Adam Elliot	Sarah Snook, Kodi Smit-McPhee, Eric Bana, Magda Szubanski, Dominique Pinon, Tony Armstrong, Paul Capsis, Bernie Clifford	Adult animation, tragicomedy	
O C T O B E R	17	The Hopeful	Kyle Portbury	Tommie-Amber Pirie, Gregory Wilson, Maddy Martin, Bill Lake, Darren Emery, Kate Hurman, Trie Donovan, Michael Mancini, Timothy Paul Coderre	Period drama	
N O V E M B E R	7	Audrey	Natalie Bailey	Jackie van Beek, Jeremy Lindsay Taylor, Josephine Blazier, Hannah Diviney, Aaron Fa'aoso, Fraser Anderson	Comedy	
N O V E M B E R	21	Nugget Is Dead?: A Christmas Story	Imogen McCluskey	Vic Zerbst, Jenna Zerbst, Jenna Owen, Gia Carides, Damien Garvey, Mandy McElhinney	Comedy	
D E C E M B E R	1	How to Make Gravy	Nick Waterman	Hugo Weaving, Daniel Henshall, Brenton Thwaites, Damon Herriman, Kate Mulvany, Agathe Rousselle	Drama	
D E C E M B E R	26	Better Man	Michael Gracey	Robbie Williams, Jonno Davies, Steve Pemberton, Alison Steadman, Kate Mulvany, Frazer Hadfield, Damon Herriman, Raechelle Banno	Biography, musical	

== See also ==
- 2024 in Australia
- 2024 in Australian television
- List of 2024 box office number-one films in Australia
