= List of 2020 box office number-one films in Australia =

This is a list of films which have placed number one at the box office in Australia during 2020.

== Number-one films ==
†	This implies the highest-grossing movie of the year.

#	Weekend end date	Film	Weekend gross	Top 20 openings
1	5 January 2020	Jumanji: The Next Level †	US$5,390,346	The Gentlemen (#3), Spies in Disguise (#5)
2	12 January 2020	1917	US$3,303,026	My Spy (#6), A Shaun the Sheep Movie: Farmageddon (#9), Darbar (#11), Sarileru Neekevvaru (#13), Ala Vaikunthapurramuloo (#15), Tanhaji: The Unsung Warrior (#16), Chhapaak (#17), True History of the Kelly Gang (#18)
3	19 January 2020	Bad Boys for Life	US$3,947,740	Dolittle (#3), Bombshell (#5), Go! (#14), The Biggest Little Farm (#20)
4	26 January 2020	Bad Boys for Life	US$2,387,802	A Beautiful Day in the Neighborhood (#6), Like a Boss (#7), Just Mercy (#10), Underwater (#17), Street Dancer 3D (#19)
5	2 February 2020	Bad Boys for Life	US$1,399,065	Midway (#3), The Grudge (#5)
6	9 February 2020	Birds of Prey	US$2,569,758	André Rieu: 70 Years Young (#4), The Lighthouse (#17)
7	16 February 2020	Sonic the Hedgehog	US$2,603,967	Emma (#4), Fantasy Island (#5), Richard Jewell (#8), Love Aaj Kal (#18)
8	23 February 2020	Sonic the Hedgehog	US$1,841,695	The Call of the Wild (#3), Shubh Mangal Zyada Saavdhan (#13), Brahms: The Boy II (#16), The Professor and the Madman (#17)
9	1 March 2020	The Invisible Man	US$1,645,334	Miss Fisher and the Crypt of Tears (#3), Les Misérables: The Staged Concert (#12), Motherless Brooklyn (#17), Ik Sandhu Hunda Si (#20)
10	8 March 2020	The Invisible Man	US$1,459,517	The Way Back (#6), Downhill (#8), Dark Waters (#12), Baaghi 3 (#13), The Big Trip (#15), Honeyland (#19)
11	15 March 2020	Bloodshot	US$879,030	Chal Mera Putt 2 (#5), I Still Believe (#8), Bethany Hamilton: Unstoppable (#18)
12	22 March 2020	Bloodshot	US$272,963	The Current War: Director's Cut (#4)
22	31 May 2020	Jumanji: The Next Level †	US$17,577	
23	7 June 2020	The Invisible Man	US$41,365	
24	14 June 2020	The Invisible Man	US$36,587	
25	21 June 2020	The Invisible Man	US$33,884	
26	28 June 2020	The Invisible Man	US$44,142	
27	5 July 2020	The Personal History of David Copperfield	US$229,330	Love Sarah (#4), Red Shoes and the Seven Dwarfs (#5), The Booksellers (#19), Romantic Road (#20)
28	12 July 2020	Sonic the Hedgehog	US$207,366	A White, White Day (#11), Shirley (#20)
29	19 July 2020	The King of Staten Island	US$233,579	Follow Me (#3), Where'd You Go, Bernadette (#10)
30	26 July 2020	The King of Staten Island	US$207,088	The Burnt Orange Heresy (#6), Babyteeth (#8)
31	2 August 2020	Unhinged	US$571,489	The Secret: Dare to Dream (#2), 23 Walks (#10)
32	9 August 2020	Unhinged	US$501,753	Peninsula (#4), Nous finirons ensemble (#10)
33	16 August 2020	Unhinged	US$324,477	Made in Italy (#3), Force of Nature (#4)
34	23 August 2020	Unhinged	US$229,217	Saint Judy (#8), Lowdown Dirty Criminals (#11)
35	30 August 2020	Tenet	US$1,832,967	Trolls World Tour (#2), The Eight Hundred (#5)
36	6 September 2020	Tenet	US$1,172,307	The New Mutants (#2), Bill & Ted Face the Music (#6), Fatima (#8), Wild Grass (#15)
37	13 September 2020	Tenet	US$795,145	After We Collided (#5), Paw Patrol: Jet to the Rescue (#7), Break the Silence: The Movie (#8), Slim and I (#9), Becky (#15), Adam (#16)
38	20 September 2020	Tenet	US$625,366	The Secret Garden (#3), An American Pickle (#8), The Broken Hearts Gallery (#9), The Translators (#10), Terra Willy (#15), Impressionisti segreti (#16), The Secrets We Keep (#19), Digimon Adventure: Last Evolution Kizuna (#20)
39	27 September 2020	Trolls World Tour	US$511,938	The High Note (#6), Cats & Dogs 3: Paws Unite! (#7), The Leadership (#15), Leap (#17)
40	4 October 2020	Trolls World Tour	US$767,053	Antebellum (#4), Jiang Ziya: Legend of Deification (#6)
41	11 October 2020	Trolls World Tour	US$564,980	The Oupost (#4), Dirt Music (#6), My People, My Homeland (#8), Savage (#12), Made in Abyss: Dawn of the Deep Soul (#16)
42	18 October 2020	City of Lies	US$197,229	André Rieu: Magical Maastricht (#2), Irresistible (#8), A Night at the Louvre: Leonardo da Vinci (#17)
43	25 October 2020	Honest Thief	US$497,362	Baby Done (#10), Corpus Christi (#11), Stevie Nicks 24 Karat Gold the Concert (#15), Three Tenors: Voice For Eternity (#16), Kajillionaire (#19)
44	1 November 2020	Rams	US$568,722	The Craft: Legacy (#3), The Empty Man (#5)
45	8 November 2020	Rams	US$488,374	Idiot Prayer (#9), Ip Man: Kung Fu Master (#17)
46	15 November 2020	Freaky	US$426,309	The Comeback Trail (#6), Laxmii (#11)
47	22 November 2020	Tenet	US$374,638	All My Life (#4), Fatman (#6), Gekijouban Fate/Stay Night: Heaven's Feel: - III. Spring Song (#9), Pinocchio (#12), Suraj Pe Mangal Bhari (#14), Little Mix: LM5 - The Tour Film (#15)
48	29 November 2020	Happiest Season	US$408,913	Let Him Go (#3), Misbehaviour (#7), American Utopia (#11), SIX60: Till the Lights Go Out (#18)
49	6 December 2020	The War with Grandpa	US$699,602	The Bees Gees: How Can You Mend a Broken Heart (#10), Violet Evergarden: The Movie (#12), A Gift from Bob (#15), The Furnace (#16), Christmas Jars (#17)
50	13 December 2020	The Witches	US$849,351	Words on Bathroom Walls (#5), The End of the Storm (#11), Caught in Time (#14)
51	20 December 2020	The War with Grandpa	US$669,171	Superintelligence (#3), Dreamland (#8), The Rescue (#19)
52	27 December 2020	Wonder Woman 1984	US$3,989,697	The Croods: A New Age (#2), Shock Wave 2 (#6), Solo Brathuke So Better (#7), A Call to Spy (#9), How to Be a Good Wife (#11)

== Highest-grossing films ==
Highest-grossing films of 2020
Rank	Title	Distributor	Domestic gross
1	Jumanji: The Next Level	Sony Pictures / Columbia	$21,185,430
2	1917	Universal	$15,797,280
3	Bad Boys for Life	Sony Pictures / Columbia	$14,912,862
4	Tenet	Warner Bros.	$11,149,729
5	Sonic the Hedgehog	Paramount	$10,676,192
6	The Gentlemen	Roadshow Films	$10,562,717
7	Little Women	Sony Pictures / Columbia	$9,791,006
8	Star Wars: The Rise of Skywalker	Disney	$8,502,187
9	Wonder Woman 1984	Warner Bros.	$8,152,350
10	Birds of Prey	Warner Bros.	$7,537,396

== See also ==
- List of Australian films – Australian films by year
- 2020 in film
