= List of 2023 box office number-one films in Australia =

The following is a list of 2023 box office number-one films in Australia by weekend.

== Number-one films ==
This is a list of films which have placed number one at the box office in Australia during 2023.

| † | This implies the highest-grossing movie of the year. |

| # | Weekend end date | Film | Weekend gross | Top 10 openings |
|---|---|---|---|---|
| 1 | 8 January 2023 | Avatar: The Way of Water | US$5,690,800 | The Fabelmans (#7), Mummies (#9) |
| 2 | 15 January 2023 | Avatar: The Way of Water | US$3,610,712 | M3GAN (#3), Operation Fortune: Ruse de Guerre (#4), Varisu (#9) |
| 3 | 22 January 2023 | Avatar: The Way of Water | US$2,813,811 | |
| 4 | 29 January 2023 | Avatar: The Way of Water | US$2,311,994 | Pathaan (#2), What's Love Got to Do with It? (#4), Tár (#9) |
| 5 | 5 February 2023 | Avatar: The Way of Water | US$1,193,360 | Knock at the Cabin (#2), Andre Rieu in Dublin 2023 (#3), BTS: Yet to Come in Cinemas (#7), The Whale (#8) |
| 6 | 12 February 2023 | Magic Mike's Last Dance | US$1,167,388 | |
| 7 | 19 February 2023 | Ant-Man and the Wasp: Quantumania | US$4,450,321 | Winnie the Pooh: Blood and Honey (#10) |
| 8 | 26 February 2023 | Ant-Man and the Wasp: Quantumania | US$1,993,423 | Cocaine Bear (#2), Fisherman's Friends: One and All (#5), Missing (#6), Aftersun (#8) |
| 9 | 5 March 2023 | Creed III | US$2,266,496 | Demon Slayer: Kimetsu no Yaiba – To the Swordsmith Village (#4), Empire of Light (#7) |
| 10 | 12 March 2023 | Scream VI | US$2,000,000 | 65 (#3), Champions (#6), Tu Jhoothi Main Makkaar (#8) |
| 11 | 19 March 2023 | Shazam! Fury of the Gods | US$1,556,542 | Living (#4), Full River Red (#9) |
| 12 | 26 March 2023 | John Wick: Chapter 4 | US$4,709,631 | |
| 13 | 2 April 2023 | John Wick: Chapter 4 | US$2,681,056 | |
| 14 | 9 April 2023 | The Super Mario Bros. Movie | US$7,018,316 | |
| 15 | 16 April 2023 | The Super Mario Bros. Movie | US$6,611,620 | |
| 16 | 23 April 2023 | The Super Mario Bros. Movie | US$4,459,596 | |
| 17 | 30 April 2023 | The Super Mario Bros. Movie | US$1,839,362 | |
| 18 | 7 May 2023 | Guardians of the Galaxy Vol. 3 | US$7,081,299 | |
| 19 | 14 May 2023 | Guardians of the Galaxy Vol. 3 | US$4,334,968 | Book Club: The Next Chapter (#2) |
| 20 | 21 May 2023 | Fast X | US$4,509,991 | |
| 21 | 28 May 2023 | The Little Mermaid | US$3,995,825 | Renfield (#6) |
| 22 | 4 June 2023 | The Little Mermaid | US$2,688,653 | The Boogeyman (#4) |
| 23 | 11 June 2023 | The Little Mermaid | US$2,082,035 | The Roundup: No Way Out (#6) |
| 24 | 18 June 2023 | Elemental | US$1,092,510 | You Hurt My Feelings (#6) |
| 25 | 25 June 2023 | Elemental | US$936,660 | |
| 26 | 2 July 2023 | Indiana Jones and the Dial of Destiny | US$3,836,259 | |
| 27 | 9 July 2023 | Indiana Jones and the Dial of Destiny | US$2,099,418 | Lost in the Stars (#4), Joy Ride (#5) |
| 28 | 16 July 2023 | Mission: Impossible – Dead Reckoning Part One | US$8,400,000 | |
| 29 | 23 July 2023 | Barbie † | US$14,600,000 | Oppenheimer (#2) |
| 30 | 30 July 2023 | Barbie † | US$11,700,000 | Talk to Me (#3) |
| 31 | 6 August 2023 | Barbie † | US$7,700,000 | About My Father (#5) |
| 32 | 13 August 2023 | Barbie † | US$4,500,000 | Asteroid City (#3) |
| 33 | 20 August 2023 | Barbie † | US$2,600,000 | Strays (#3) |
| 34 | 27 August 2023 | Barbie † | US$1,700,000 | |
| 35 | 3 September 2023 | The Equalizer 3 | US$2,300,000 | Haunted Mansion (#3) |
| 36 | 10 September 2023 | The Nun II | US$1,500,000 | My Big Fat Greek Wedding 3 (#2) |
| 37 | 17 September 2023 | My Big Fat Greek Wedding 3 | US$716,434 | A Haunting in Venice (#2) |
| 38 | 24 September 2023 | PAW Patrol: The Mighty Movie | US$1,100,000 | Ruby Gillman, Teenage Kraken (#4) |
| 39 | 1 October 2023 | The Creator | US$1,010,629 | Saw X (#2) |
| 40 | 8 October 2023 | The Exorcist: Believer | US$774,983 | |
| 41 | 15 October 2023 | The Exorcist: Believer | US$427,303 | |
| 42 | 22 October 2023 | Killers of the Flower Moon | US$1,400,000 | |
| 43 | 29 October 2023 | Five Nights at Freddy's | US$3,792,000 | |
| 44 | 5 November 2023 | Five Nights at Freddy's | US$1,832,319 | |
| 45 | 12 November 2023 | The Marvels | US$1,862,022 | Tiger 3 (#5), Freelance (#7) |
| 46 | 19 November 2023 | The Hunger Games: The Ballad of Songbirds & Snakes | US$3,563,755 | |
| 47 | 26 November 2023 | Napoleon | US$2,656,495 | |
| 48 | 3 December 2023 | The Hunger Games: The Ballad of Songbirds & Snakes | US$1,626,921 | |
| 49 | 10 December 2023 | The Hunger Games: The Ballad of Songbirds & Snakes | US$1,203,117 | |
| 50 | 17 December 2023 | Wonka | US$4,095,982 | |
| 51 | 24 December 2023 | Wonka | US$2,667,680 | |
| 52 | 31 December 2023 | Aquaman and the Lost Kingdom | US$5,800,000 | |

== Highest-grossing films ==
=== In-year releases ===
Highest-grossing films of 2023
| Rank | Title | Distributor | Aus gross US$ | Aus gross AU$ |
|---|---|---|---|---|
| 1 | Barbie | Warner Bros | $58,569,799 | |
| 2 | The Super Mario Bros. Movie | Universal | $34,033,729 | $48,690,000 |
| 3 | Oppenheimer | Universal | $28,452,341 | |
| 4 | Spider-Man: Across the Spider-Verse | Sony Pictures Releasing | $22,367,007 | |
| 5 | Guardians of the Galaxy Vol. 3 | Disney | $21,533,532 | |
| 6 | John Wick: Chapter 4 | Studiocanal | $16,728,590 | $24,170,000 |
| 7 | The Little Mermaid | Disney | $15,424,132 | |
| 8 | Mission: Impossible – Dead Reckoning Part One | Paramount | $14,367,980 | $15,426,596 |
| 9 | The Hunger Games: The Ballad of Songbirds & Snakes | Lionsgate Films | $13,776,080 | |
| 10 | Elemental | Disney | $11,546,810 | |

Highest-grossing films by ACB rating of 2023
| G | Trolls Band Together |
| PG | Barbie |
| M | Guardians of the Galaxy Vol. 3 |
| MA 15+ | Oppenheimer |
| R 18+ | Evil Dead Rise |

== See also ==
- List of Australian films of 2023
- 2023 in film
- List of 2024 box office number-one films in Australia

| Preceded by 2022 Box office number-one films | Box office number-one films 2023 | Succeeded by 2024 Box office number-one films |
