= Married Love (Upstairs, Downstairs) =

- Upstairs, Downstairs episode
- Episode no.: Season 2 Episode 3
- Directed by: Raymond Menmuir
- Written by: Alfred Shaughnessy
- Original air date: 4 November 1972

Guest appearances
- Charles Gray (Sir Edwin Partridge); Ian Ogilvy (Lawrence Kirbridge); Dorothy Frere (Mrs. Fellowes); Brian Osborne (Pearce); James Woolley (Hinton); Peter Myers (Smethurst); Tony Aitken (Mulligan); Edward Harvey (Tomkins)

Episode chronology
← Previous "A Pair of Exiles"	Next → "Whom God Hath Joined..."

"Married Love" is the third episode of the second series of the British television series, Upstairs, Downstairs. The episode is set in 1908. It follows the narrative of Elizabeth and Lawrence's marriage, begun in "The New Man". Uniquely, no scenes in the episode take place in the series' primary location of 165 Eaton Place.

"Married Love" was among the episodes omitted from Upstairs, Downstairs' initial Masterpiece Theatre broadcast in 1974, and was consequently not shown on US television until 1989.

== Plot ==
Elizabeth's marriage to Lawrence Kirbridge remains deeply unhappy, with Lawrence not wishing to consummate the relationship. Lawrence 'arranges' for his publisher, the much older Sir Edwin Partridge, to have sex with Elizabeth at a soiree the couple hosts.

== Cast ==
Regular cast

- Jean Marsh (Rose Buck)
- John Alderton (Thomas Watkins)
- Nicola Pagett (Elizabeth Kirbridge)
- Rachel Gurney (Lady Marjorie Bellamy)
- Ian Ogilvy (Lawrence Kirbridge)

Guest cast

- Charles Gray (Sir Edwin Partridge)
- Dorothy Frere (Mrs. Fellowes)
- Brian Osborne (Pearce)
- James Woolley (Hinton)
- Peter Myers (Smethurst)
- Tony Aitken (Mulligan)
- Edward Harvey (Tomkins)
