= Whom God Hath Joined... =

- Upstairs, Downstairs episode
- Episode no.: Season 2 Episode 4
- Directed by: Raymond Menmuir
- Written by: Alfred Shaughnessy
- Original air date: 10 November 1972

Guest appearances
- Ian Ogilvy (Lawrence Kirbridge); Raymond Huntley (Sir Geoffrey Dillon); Bryan Coleman (Sir William Manning)

Episode chronology
← Previous "Married Love"	Next → "Guest of Honour"

"Whom God Hath Joined..." is the fourth episode of the second series of the British television series, Upstairs, Downstairs. The episode is set in 1909.

== Background ==
In the winter of 1908, Elizabeth becomes involved with a group of socialist poets, and upsets her parents by inviting them to tea. She also, under the influence of one member, Evelyn Larkin, accrues a bill of over four pounds on shoes for street children, but then refuses to pay for them. Her father intervenes and pays for the shoes. After an argument with her parents, Elizabeth runs away from home to stay with her friend Henrietta Winchmore, and is only discovered after Rose is forced to tell Hudson where Elizabeth is staying. Her father visits her, and shortly after, Elizabeth and fellow poet Lawrence Kirbridge have tea at Eaton Place.

Although Elizabeth is reluctant to marry, the head housemaid and friend Rose, persuades her it is the right thing to do. She and Lawrence Kirbridge, the Cambridge-educated grandson of a baronet, marry in June 1909. (Note: According to Series One, she and Lawrence marry in 1909, however in Series Two everything is put back a year, and they are said to marry in 1908. This article follows the Series One date.) They honeymoon in Vienna, and set up home in Greenwich.

The marriage is an unhappy affair from the start, and Lawrence does not wish to consummate the relationship. Lawrence arranges for his publisher, the much older Sir Edwin Partridge, to have sex with Elizabeth at a soiree which the couple host.

== Plot ==
Shortly before Christmas 1909, Elizabeth moves back to her parents' home at Eaton Place. Initially she says that she is coming to stay whilst Lawrence is visiting his aunt in Shropshire. When Lawrence returns home to Greenwich, the only other person in the house is his valet Watkins. After Watkins tells Lawrence what has happened, Lawrence says that he loved his wife, but not in the way she wanted him to, and asks Watkins whether he thinks he is homosexual, to which Watkins replies that he thinks Lawrence is a romantic. Watkins agrees to remain employed as Lawrence's valet.

Elizabeth informs her parents that her marriage has failed. The family solicitor, Sir Geoffrey Dillon, prepares for an annulment of the marriage on the grounds it has not been consummated. However, at an examination by a doctor, it is revealed that Elizabeth is three to four months pregnant; she is forced by her father to divulge the identity of the father. In order to avoid a scandal, it is eventually agreed that Lawrence will be sent abroad with an allowance, and the Greenwich house will be sold. Much to Lawrence's anger, the Bellamy family take on Watkins as their chauffeur.

== Cast ==
Regular cast

- Rachel Gurney (Lady Marjorie Bellamy)
- Gordon Jackson (Mr. Agnus Hudson)
- Angela Baddeley (Mrs. Kate Bridges)
- Jean Marsh (Rose Bucke)
- David Langton (Richard Bellamy)
- John Alderton (Thomas Watkins)
- Nicola Pagett (Elizabeth Kirbridge)
- Patsy Smart (Roberts)

Guest cast

- Ian Ogilvy (Lawrence Kirbridge)
- Raymond Huntley (Sir Geoffrey Dillon)
- Bryan Coleman (Sir William Manning)

== What happens later in the series ==
Later, Elizabeth Kirbridge gives birth to a daughter, Lucy Elizabeth, in a London nursing home. To avoid scandal and since Lawrence is the legal father, he is asked to attend the baby's christening. Following the ceremony, he is never heard from again. Elizabeth, lacking maternal feelings, is indifferent to the baby and content to have Lucy brought up in the nursery by the servants.
