= A Pair of Exiles =

- Upstairs, Downstairs episode
- Episode no.: Series 2 Episode 2
- Directed by: Raymond Menmuir
- Written by: Alfred Shaughnessy
- Original air date: 28 October 1972

Episode chronology
← Previous "The New Man"	Next → "Married Love"

"A Pair of Exiles" is the second episode of the second series of the British television series, Upstairs, Downstairs. The episode is set in 1908.

== Plot ==
James and Sarah have an affair that results in Sarah's pregnancy. James is in debt of around £1350. James's regiment contacts his parents about his debts, and he then confesses everything to them. The family solicitor, Sir Geoffrey Dillon, arranges for Sarah to be sent to Lady Marjorie's family home, Southwold, and for James to be transferred to India with the Sind Horse Regiment, although Lady Marjorie is furious that James has been sent abroad.
