= Thomas Shaughnessy, 1st Baron Shaughnessy =

American-Canadian railway administrator (1853–1923)

The Right Honourable The Lord Shaughnessy KCVO
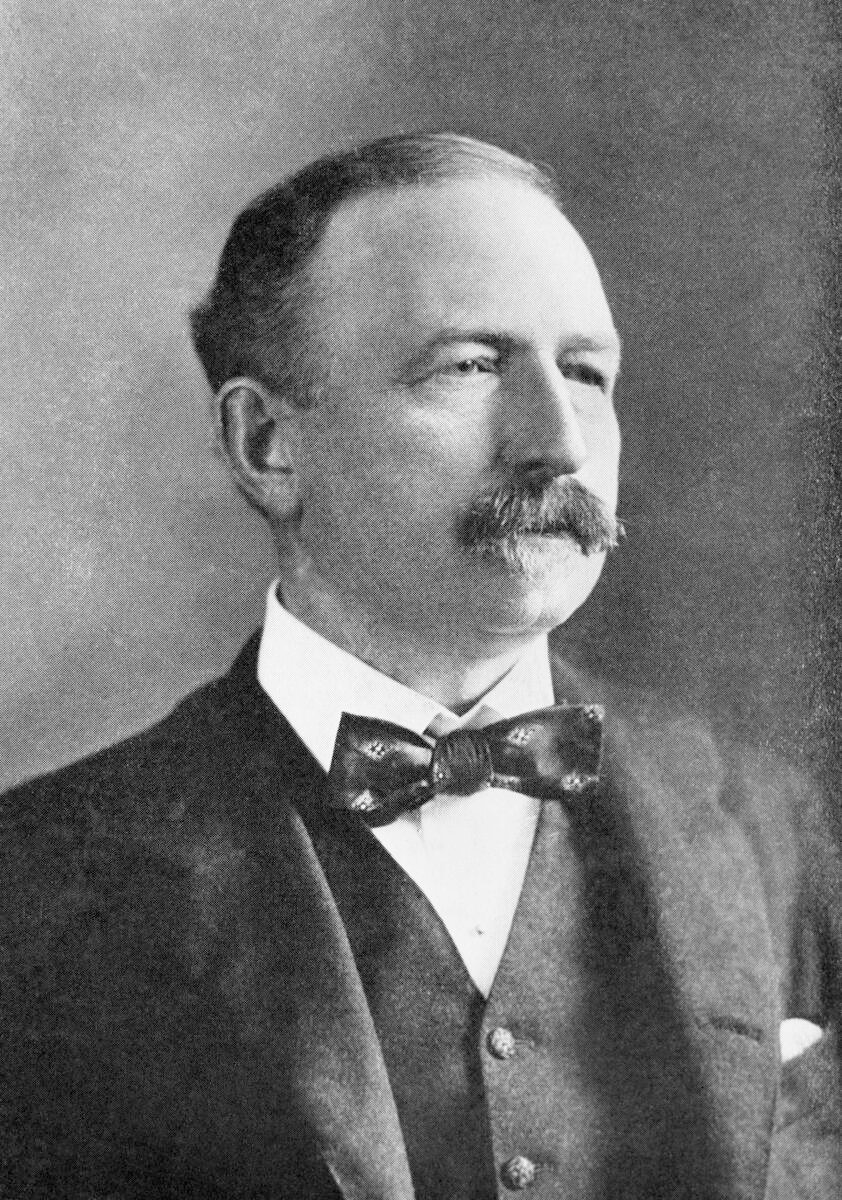
- Thomas George Shaughnessy circa 1910
- Born: Thomas George Shaughnessy; 6 October 1853; Milwaukee, Wisconsin, U.S.
- Died: 10 December 1923 (aged 70); Montreal, Quebec, Canada
- Spouse: Elizabeth Bridget Nagle

Signature
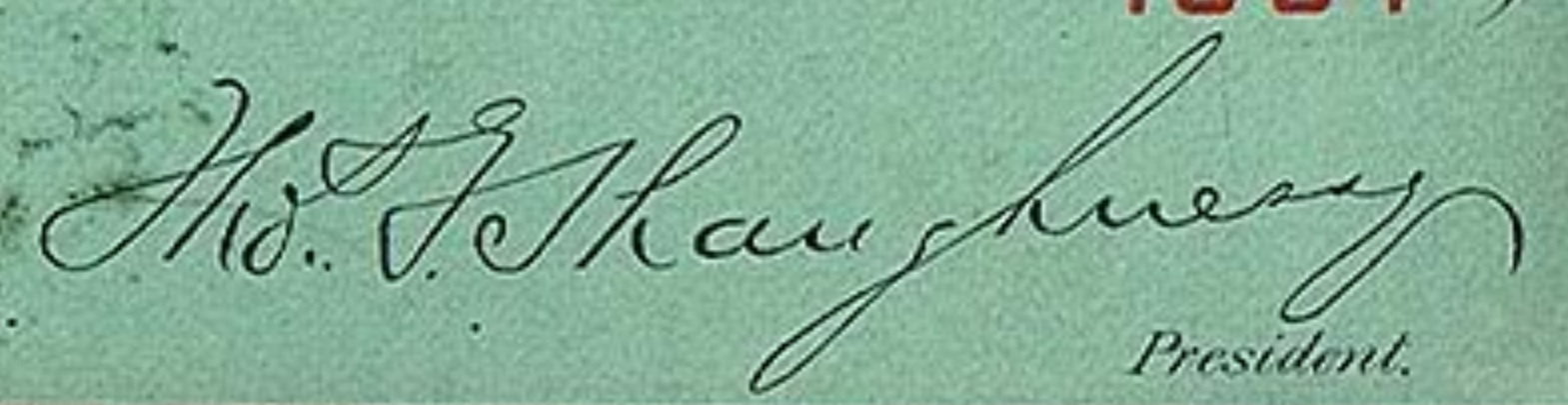

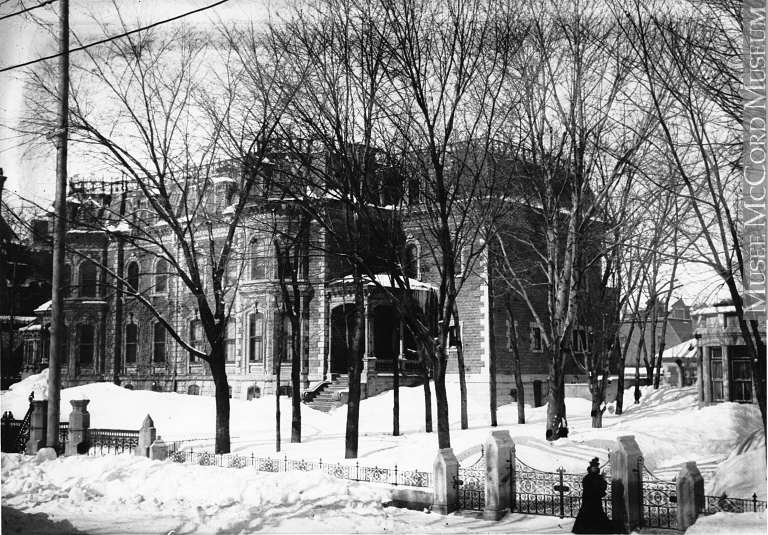
Shaughnessy House, Montreal, circa 1900. Designed by William Thomas

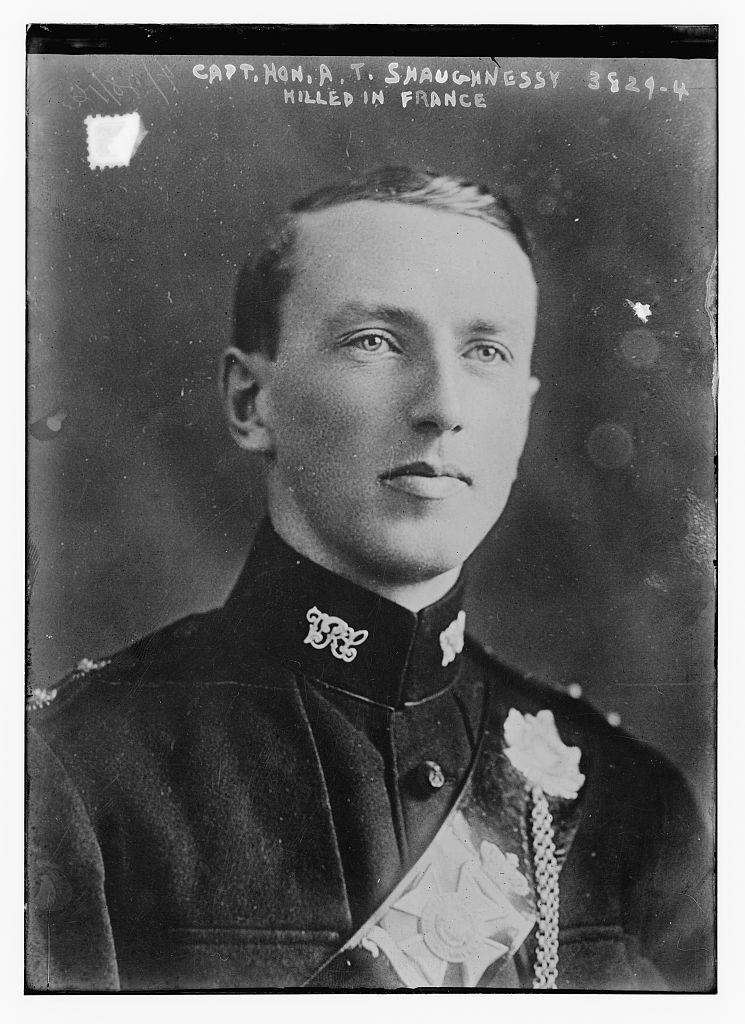
Alfred Thomas Shaughnessy, the son of Thomas Shaughnessy, 1st Baron Shaughnessy

Thomas George Shaughnessy, 1st Baron Shaughnessy, KCVO (6 October 1853 – 10 December 1923) was an American-Canadian railway administrator who rose from modest beginnings as a clerk and bookkeeper for the Milwaukee and St. Paul Railroad (a predecessor of the Chicago, Milwaukee, St. Paul and Pacific Railroad) to become the president of the Canadian Pacific Railway, serving in that capacity from 1899 to 1918. In recognition of his stewardship of the CPR and its contributions to the war effort during the Great War, Shaughnessy was elevated to the Peerage of the United Kingdom on 1 January 1916 as Baron Shaughnessy, of the City of Montreal in the Dominion of Canada and of Ashford in the County of Limerick.

== Biography ==
Shaughnessy was born 6 October 1853, at Milwaukee, Wisconsin. He was the son of Irish Catholics, Lieutenant Tom Shaughnessy (1818–1903), "one of the shrewdest detectives and patrolmen" in the early Milwaukee Police Department, and his wife Mary Kennedy (1826–1905). His father was born at Ashford, in Killeedy, County Limerick, and like his wife they came to the United States before the Great Famine, about 1840.

Shaughnessy briefly attended the Spencerian Business College of Milwaukee, but at the age of 16 went to work for the Milwaukee and St. Paul Railroad, first as a clerk in the purchasing department, then as a bookkeeper.

In 1875, he became the adjutant of the 1st Regiment of the Wisconsin State Militia. That same year he was elected to the Milwaukee Common Council from the Third Ward, at that time heavily Irish-American. He was re-elected from 1875 through 1882, serving in the latter year as President of the Council. and briefly, in 1882, as its president.

In 1880 William Cornelius Van Horne, the new general superintendent of what was now called the Chicago, Milwaukee and St. Paul Railway, appointed him as general purchasing agent. In the wake of a report by Shaughnessy and two colleagues on best practices of stores departments of other large railroads and recommending changes in the Road's own practices, Shaughnessy, was charged with implementing the changes on the Milwaukee Road.

=== Canadian Pacific Railway ===
Shaughnessy arrived in Montreal in November 1882 to work for the Canadian Pacific Railway as general purchasing agent. He is described by E. A. James, Van Horne's private telegrapher, as "a fashionably-dressed, alert young man, sporting a cane and giving general evidence of being what we call a live wire." The perpetually well-dressed perfectionist Shaughnessy (who appears to have been obsessive-compulsive as well; he obsessed over cleanliness, washed his hands repeatedly every day, and as president would refuse to share an elevator with anyone else) became known for tight cost controls and a meticulous scrutiny of purchases and other expenditures. The Dictionary of Canadian Biography states,

Shaughnessy had an essentially pessimistic view of human nature... He was convinced that, given the opportunity, suppliers, contractors, carriers, workers, and anyone else would cheat the company. Constant vigilance was essential. Everything had to be done in accordance with the many rules and regulations he introduced. He delighted in tracing even minor transgressions and then publicly humiliating the perpetrators, usually in writing to ensure that the information became a part of the permanent record. Even the company's most trusted contractors and senior officials were exposed to his wrath if, in their efforts to get necessary work done on time, they paid prices higher than was deemed appropriate or if they failed in any other way to follow his system.

He also managed expenditures by delaying payments as long as possible on whatever excuse, to the extent permitted by law and practicalities: a practice which is credited in most histories of the CPR as being in part responsible for the ability of the line to stay afloat, particularly during the period in the early months of 1885, when the very difficult section of the line along Lake Superior was being financed by the faith and credit of the corporation.

Shaughnessy became CPR's assistant general manager in 1885 and assistant to the president in September 1889. In 1891 Shaughnessy became a director and vice-president of the railroad. He succeeded Van Horne as president on 12 June 1898. He immediately proceeded to centralize financial operations in the Montreal corporation headquarters, taking centralized control over budget, earnings, and allocations, while devolving operational control to divisional heads in the field; a policy he had been urging upon Van Horne for some time. He was a great admirer of Van Horne, and remained grateful for his long-time patron's friendship and help, but was outspoken about what he saw as Van Horne's legacy of a lack of systematic organization and management.

=== CPR under Shaughnessy's presidency ===
During his presidency, the Canadian Pacific's steamship services, first domestic, then from Vancouver to Asia (the Empress Line), then trans-Atlantic, were steadily expanded and upgraded, eventually making this railroad one of the world's major shipping owners as well. To promote tourism and passenger traffic, new or existing CPR-owned hotels, chalets and mountain camps were expanded or built in from the Maritimes to Victoria, each held to Shaughnessy's meticulous standards for cleanliness. The CPR under Shaughnessy controlled the Consolidated Mining and Smelting Company of Canada and the Crow's Nest Pass Railway.

Under Shaughnessy's administration, the CPR's mileage in western Canada almost doubled. The Canadian Northern Railway and the Grand Trunk Pacific Railway sought and often received subsidies in order to compete effectively with the politically-unpopular CPR (which had itself benefitted by federal cash and land subsidies in its early years). Shaughnessy held his own before the newly created Board of Railway Commissioners, successfully arguing that higher rates in Western Canada were justified by the high costs, an argument which would finally be officially accepted by the Board in 1914. It was said of him, "As an operator of railways [he] probably has not a superior on this continent, which is equivalent to saying that he has not an equal in this line in the world."

=== World War I ===
At the outbreak of World War I, Shaughnessy was a strong backer of the Empire's war, and put CPR's resources behind it as well. Shaughnessy's work in support of the war effort was the reason for his elevation to the peerage in 1916. By this point the former Milwaukeean was "an Imperialist's Imperialist, a staunch supporter of Monarch, Empire and Nation", so British in outlook that he is reported to have been offered (but declined) a cabinet post under H. H. Asquith.

The younger of his two sons (both were serving overseas), Alfred Thomas, was killed in action in France on 31 March 1916 while serving in the Canadian Expeditionary Force.

Shaughnessy resigned from the presidency of the CPR in 1918, citing his deteriorating eyesight. He continued to be chairman of the board until his death.

=== Death ===
Shaughnessy died 10 December 1923 after a heart attack the day before. On his deathbed, he instructed his successor as head of the CPR, Edward Wentworth Beatty: "Maintain the property. It is a great Canadian property, and a great Canadian enterprise." His eldest son, William James Shaughnessy, succeeded him as second Baron Shaughnessy. He was entombed at the Notre Dame des Neiges Cemetery in Montreal.

== Business and political leadership ==
Shaughnessy represented the CPR on the boards of major financial institutions with which it had extensive dealings, including the Bank of Montreal, the Royal Trust Company, the Accident Insurance Company of North America, and The Guarantee Company of North America. He was in agreement with most of the Anglophone Canadian corporate élite, (including ex-Americans like Van Horne and himself), in opposing the Liberal government's suggestion of a reciprocal free trade agreement with the United States, and like most of them, joined in providing powerful support for Robert Borden's Conservative opposition in the 1911 election which swept Laurier's Liberals out of power after 15 years in power. When Shaughnessy urged, "Fix the channels of Canadian trade eastward and westward," it was immediately pointed out that this policy was in accordance with the financial interest of his railway.

== Personal life and legacy ==
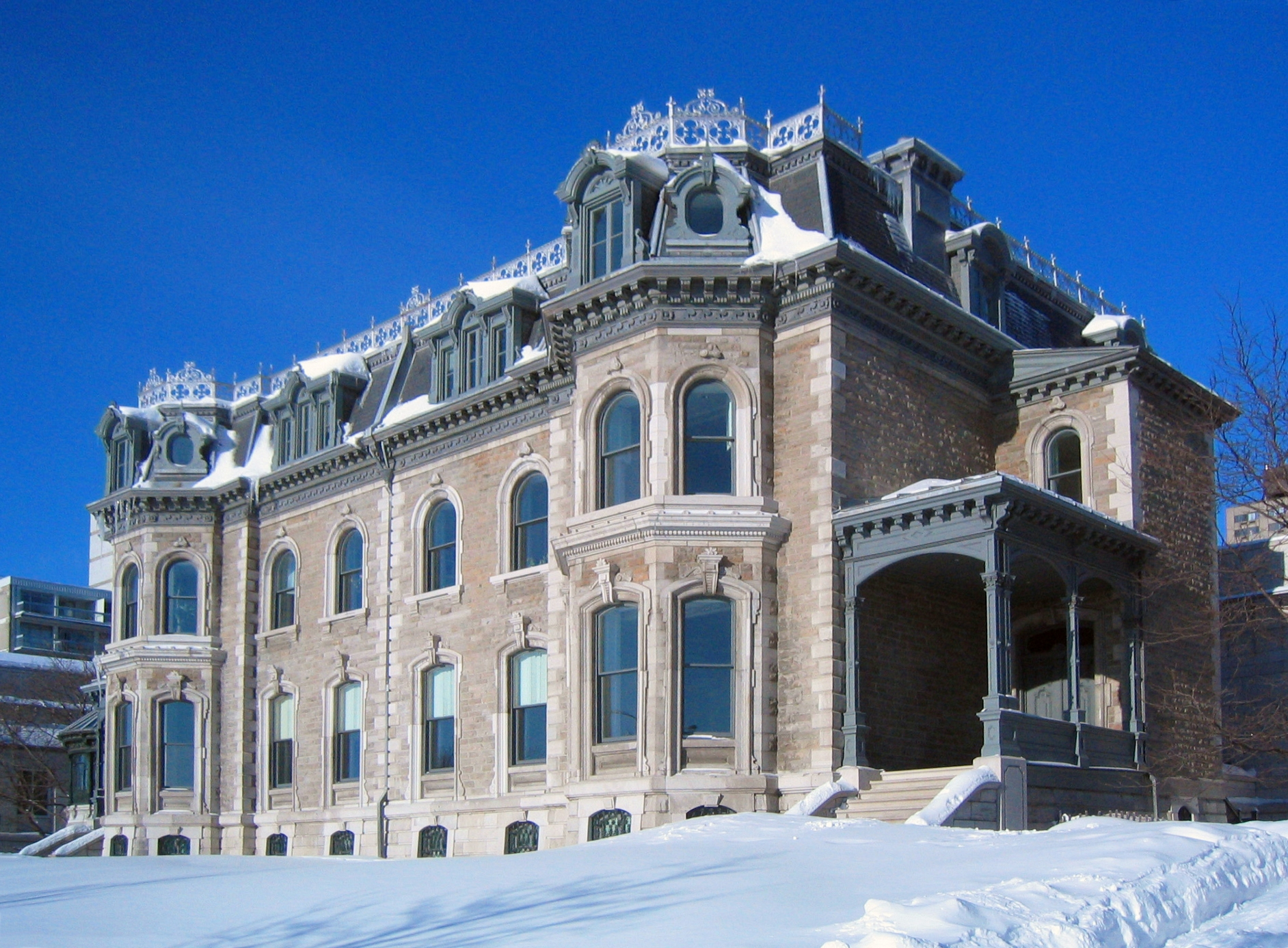
Shaughnessy House today, part of the Canadian Centre for Architecture

Shaughnessy House, his home in Montreal's Golden Square Mile, was designed by Montreal architect William Thomas in 1876. Though reduced from its original size, it was declared a National Historic Site of Canada in 1974 and is now part of the Canadian Centre for Architecture. The surrounding district is named Shaughnessy Village. Vancouver's prestigious neighbourhood of Shaughnessy is also named after him.

He married Elizabeth Bridget Nagle in 1880. The Shaughnessys had two sons (William James Shaughnessy was captain and adjutant of the Duchess of Connaught's Irish-Canadian Rangers, second Baron Shaughnessy; and Alfred Thomas Shaughnessy, killed in action in 1916 while serving as a captain in the Canadian Expeditionary Force in France) and three daughters, including Marguerite Kathleen Shaughnessy, for whom the CPR coastal liner SS Princess Marguerite was named. Alfred Thomas was the father of the writer and producer Alfred Shaughnessy, best known for serving as the script editor of Upstairs, Downstairs and father of director and voice-over actor David Shaughnessy and actor Charles Shaughnessy (Days of Our Lives, The Nanny), who is the fifth and current holder of the title Baron Shaughnessy.

Archives Canada has his papers from later years at the CPR (1913–1922), plus other materials connected with the family, particularly the second Baron Shaughnessy. They are housed in the Glenbow Archives in Calgary, Alberta.

Shaughnessy was the namesake of the steel steamer Sir Thomas Shaughnessy, a 6,276-ton, 500-foot Great Lakes freighter built in 1906 by the Detroit Shipbuilding Company at Wyandotte, Michigan. This vessel was owned by the Jenkins Steamship Company of Cleveland, Ohio. Before the opening of the 1936 season of navigation, Sir Thomas Shaughnessy was sold to the Mohawk Navigation Company, Ltd. of Montreal, which operated the vessel on the Great Lakes for the remainder of its career. The steamer was sold for scrap in 1969.

== Honours and Arms ==
- Knight Bachelor – October 1901 – during the visit to Canada of the Duke and Duchess of Cornwall and York (later King George V and Queen Mary)
- Order of the Sacred Treasure of the 2nd class Japan, 1907
- KCVO: Knight Commander of the Royal Victorian Order – 1907
- Knight of Grace, Order of St. John, 1910
- Baron Shaughnessy, 1916

=== Arms ===
Coat of arms of Thomas Shaughnessy, 1st Baron Shaughnessy
Coronet A Coronet of a Baron Crest Issuing from an Antique Crown Or a Dexter Cubit Arm in Armour and gauntleted grasping a Two-headed Battle-axe all proper Escutcheon Per fess Gules and Azure in chief two Mill-rinds and in base an Ancient Harp Or within a Bordure engrailed Ermine Supporters Dexter: an Irish Wolfhound proper gorged with a Collar Argent charged with three Trefoils Vert; Sinister: a Beaver proper gorged with a Collar Argent charged with three Maple Leaves Gules Motto Manu Forti (Latin for 'With a strong hand') Orders Order of the Sacred Treasure, 2nd class Knight of Grace of the Order of St. John; Knight Commander of the Royal Victorian Order

== See also ==
- Canadian Hereditary Peers

Business positions
Preceded by William Cornelius Van Horne	President of Canadian Pacific Railway Limited; 1899–1918	Succeeded by Edward Wentworth Beatty
Peerage of the United Kingdom
New creation	Baron Shaughnessy; 1916–1923	Succeeded by William James Shaughnessy
