= Brandy for the Parson =

1952 British film by John Eldridge

- British theatrical poster
- Directed by: John Eldridge
- Written by: Walter Meade; John Dighton; Alfred Shaughnessy
- Based on: Brandy for the Parson by Geoffrey Household
- Starring: James Donald; Kenneth More; Jean Lodge
- Cinematography: Martin Curtis
- Edited by: John Trumper
- Music by: John Addison
- Production company: Group 3 Films
- Distributed by: Associated British-Pathé
- Release date: 20 May 1952
- Running time: 79 minutes
- Country: United Kingdom
- Language: English
- Budget: £50,000

Brandy for the Parson is a 1952 British comedy film directed by John Eldridge and starring Kenneth More, Charles Hawtrey, James Donald and Jean Lodge. It was written by Walter Meade, John Dighton and Alfred Shaughnessy based on a short story by Geoffrey Household from Tales of Adventurers (1952). The title is a reference to the refrain of the poem "A Smuggler's Song" by Rudyard Kipling.

== Plot ==
Bill and Petronilla are a young couple on a yachting holiday. They agree to give a lift to friendly Tony and his cargo, who unbeknownst to them is a brandy smuggler. Before they know it, the couple are fleeing cross-country, chased by customs men.

== Cast ==
- James Donald as Bill Harper
- Kenneth More as Tony Rackham
- Jean Lodge as Petronilla Brand
- Frederick Piper as customs inspector
- Charles Hawtrey as George Crumb
- Michael Trubshawe as Redworth
- Alfie Bass as Dallyn
- Wilfrid Caithness as Mr. Minch
- Lionel Harris as Mr. Frost
- Richard Molinas as Massaud
- Reginald Beckwith as scoutmaster
- Stanley Lemin as customs officer
- Arthur Wontner as Major Glockleigh
- Frank Tickle as vicar
- Amy Dalby as postmistress
- Wensley Pithey as circus owner
- Sam Kydd as lorry driver

== Production ==
The screenplay was based on an unused script from Ealing Studios, which was passed on to Group Three Films who produced it on a comparatively small budget. Director John Eldridge had previously worked in the documentary film sector and this was his feature film debut. Filming took seven weeks. It was made at Southall Studios in London. The film's sets were designed by the art director Ray Simm. Location shooting took place around Salcombe and the Kingsbridge Estuary in Devon as well as Dorchester in Dorset. John Grierson, head of Group Three, said "I hope it will be in the Jerome K. Jerome tradition". Audrey Hepburn was originally lined up to play the female lead, but delays in production led to her becoming unavailable and she was replaced by Jean Lodge who was married to the film's screenwriter Alfred Shaughnessy.

Kenneth More said he was cast due to Shaugnessy who had seen a test More made for Scott of the Antarctic.

== Critical reception ==
The Monthly Film Bulletin wrote: "This agreeable comedy is an altogether more hopeful introduction to the work of Group 3 than its first effort, Judgment Deferred: unlike the latter, it was produced under the supervision of John Grierson, and its accent is on young talent both in the direction and the playing. In style, the comedy derives from the Ealing genre, and though not particularly original it has a welcome freshness and intimacy. One would have liked a script with more wit and direction with more humour, but the amusing situations, some excellent playing and the very pleasing location work carry it lightly, unpretentiously through."

Variety said if the film "is a fair sample of" Group 3's "output, the government’s confidence has been fully justified, for this is an amiable entertainment. It should do pleasing business at home despite the absence of prominent marquee names. Pic should also prove a hit in American art houses."

Allmovie called it "wafer-thin comedy."

The New York Times called it "a mild but tasty distillate."

Picture Show magazine found it "well acted against a delightful background of English scenery, beautifully photographed", and the film's executive producer John Grierson described it as "a sweet lemon of a picture" with a feel of "old oak and seaweed".

Filmink said "it isn't very funny but More is... charismatic."

== Bibliography ==
- Chibnall, Steve & McFarlane, Brian. The British 'B' Film. Palgrave MacMillan, 2009.
- Harper, Sue & Porter, Vincent. British Cinema of the 1950s: The Decline of Deference. Oxford University Press, 2007.
