= Kay Alden =

American screenwriter

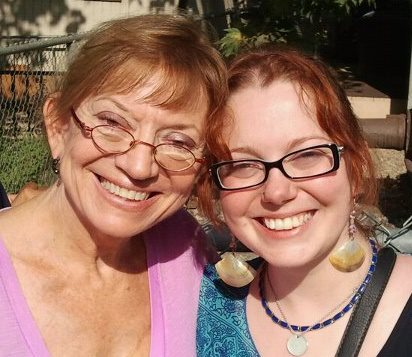
- Alden (left) with daughter, Conci Nelson
- Born: Priscilla Kay Alden; October 24, 1946 (age 79); Hutchinson, Kansas, US
- Occupation: Screenwriter
- Years active: 1974–present
- Children: 3

Priscilla Kay Alden (born October 24, 1946) is an American television writer and the former head writer for the soap opera, The Young and the Restless.

== Career ==
Alden began writing for The Young and the Restless as a script writer in 1974 while researching her dissertation at the University of Wisconsin-Madison. She was promoted to associate head writer in 1987, then to co-head writer in 1997.

She took over as head writer the following year when series co-creator William J. Bell stepped down from the position. With Alden as head writer, the show lost about two million viewers (most of the loss occurred in 2004 when Alden co-wrote the show with longtime Y&R scribe and producer John F. Smith), but all soap operas during that period experienced a similar scale of massive audience erosion.

She quit The Young and the Restless in late 2006, and was then hired by Brian Frons, president of ABC Daytime, to consult on its serials All My Children, General Hospital and One Life to Live. She left ABC Daytime after declining All My Children's head writer position in Spring 2007, and was hired by Bradley Bell in May 2007 to be an associate head writer for another CBS Daytime drama, The Bold and the Beautiful. On July 18, 2008, it was announced that Alden would be appointed co-head writer of The Bold and the Beautiful in the coming weeks.

Alden, formerly a member of Writers Guild of America, East, left and maintained financial core status while working for The Bold and the Beautiful during the 2007–08 Writers Guild of America strike.

In 2012, Alden was spotted on the set of The Young and the Restless for the taping of the show's 10,000th episode, leading many to believe she'd re-joined the show as a writer or story consultant.

However, this never came to pass. On September 21, 2016, Daytime Confidential reported that after ten years since being with the show, Alden had been hired to be story consultant at Y&R, under Sally Sussman's tenure as Head writer.

On July 31, 2017, Daytime Confidential announced that both Alden and Sussman would be departing from the show, with Mal Young being named as the new head writer.

There is a scholarship in Alden's name from Emporia State University, in Emporia, Kansas.

== Personal life ==
She has three children and lives with her husband in Illinois.

== Positions held ==
The Young and the Restless

- Scriptwriter: May 13, 1974–80
- Breakdown writer: 1980–87
- Script editor: 1983–85, 1986–87
- Associate head writer: 1987–97
- Co-head writer: February 14, 1997 –July 3, 1998; February 16 – December 22, 2006
- Head writer: July 6, 1998 – February 15, 2006
- Story Consultant: December 6, 2016 – October 27, 2017

All My Children

- Story Consultant December 2006 – April 2007

One Life to Live

- Story Consultant: December 2006 – April 2007

General Hospital

- Story Consultant December 2006 – April 2007

The Bold and the Beautiful

- Co-head writer: January 2, 2009 – October 2, 2013
- Associate Head Writer: August 13, 2007 – January 28, 2008; April 16, 2008 – December 31, 2008
- Interim Head Writer: February 5, 2008 – April 15, 2008

== Head Writing Tenure ==
Preceded by William J. Bell	Head Writer of The Young and the Restless (with William J. Bell: February 14, 1997 – July 3, 1998) (with John F. Smith: December 23, 2002 – November 10, 2006) (with Trent Jones: August 21, 2000 – August 5, 2004) (with Lynn Marie Latham: February 16 – December 22, 2006) (with Scott Hamner: October 26, 2006 – December 22, 2006); February 14, 1997 – December 22, 2006	Succeeded by Lynn Marie Latham; Scott Hamner
Preceded by WGA Strike	Head Writer of The Bold and the Beautiful; February 5 – April 15, 2008	Succeeded by Bradley Bell
Preceded by Bradley Bell	Head Writer of The Bold and the Beautiful (with Bradley Bell and Michael Minnis); January 2, 2009 – October 2, 2013	Succeeded by Bradley Bell; Michael Minnis

== Awards and nominations ==
Daytime Emmy Award

- Nominations, 2008, 2009, Best Writing The Bold and the Beautiful
- Nominations, 1976, 1979, 1986, 1987, 1990–1995, 1997–2001, 2003–2007, Best Writing, The Young and the Restless
- Wins, 1997, 2000, 2006, Best Writing, The Young and the Restless; 2010, Best Writing, The Bold and the Beautiful

Writers Guild of America Award

- Wins, 2002 & 2005, Best Writing, The Young and the Restless
- Nominations, 1999, 2001, 2006, Best Writing, The Young and the Restless
