= Creative consultant =

Profession in film

Creative consultant is a credit that is given to people who have consulted on a film or television screenplay. They are involved in the writing process (proposing and editing story outlines/scripts). Sometimes they are given the credit of executive consultant, story consultant or script consultant.

"Creative consultant" is not listed by the Writers Guild of America as one of its standard credits to be given in television and film. The WGA discourages the use of credits not included on their list and requires that a waiver be obtained in order to credit someone as a creative consultant in television or film. Tom Mankiewicz's credit as creative consultant for the 1978 film Superman appeared after the writers' credits, leading to a dispute which Mankiewicz ultimately won.

== Notable creative consultants ==
- Guillermo del Toro (Kung Fu Panda 2, Megamind)
- Kay Alden (All My Children, One Life to Live, and General Hospital)
- William J. Bell (Days of Our Lives)
- James L. Brooks (executive creative consultant, The Simpsons)
- Constance M. Burge (Charmed)
- Betty Corday (The Young and the Restless)
- Ted Elliott and Terry Rossio (Antz, Sinbad: Legend of the Seven Seas, Shrek 2)
- Brian Frons (All My Children and One Life to Live)
- Vince Gilligan (The X-Files)
- Matt Groening (The Simpsons)
- Bill Hader (South Park)
- Alex Hirsch (Fish Hooks and The Owl House)
- Kevin James (The King Of Queens)
- Lynn Marie Latham (The Young and the Restless)
- Harding Lemay (Guiding Light)
- George Lucas (Star Wars: The Force Awakens)
- Sally Sussman Morina (The Young and the Restless)
- Agnes Nixon (ABC Daytime Lineup and The City)
- Bob Odenkirk (Tim and Eric Awesome Show Great Job)
- Frank Oz (The Muppet Show)
- Gene Roddenberry (Star Trek: The Animated Series; films Star Trek II: The Wrath of Khan, Star Trek III: The Search for Spock, Star Trek IV: The Voyage Home, Star Trek V: The Final Frontier)
- Tom Mankiewicz (Superman: The Movie, Superman II, Ladyhawke)
