= Jean Lodge =

English actress (1927–2026)

- Born: 4 August 1927; Hull, East Riding of Yorkshire, England
- Died: 5 August 2026 (aged 99)
- Education: Hull High School; Beverley High School
- Occupation: Actress
- Spouse: Alfred Shaughnessy (m. 1948; died 2005)
- Children: Charles Shaughnessy; David Shaughnessy

Jean Margaret Lodge (4 August 1927 – 5 August 2026) was an English stage, film and television actress.

== Early life ==
Lodge was born in Kingston upon Hull, Yorkshire, on 4 August 1927, her parents were George and Florence Lodge. George Lodge was a businessman. She attended Hull High School and Beverley High School, before going to a commercial college.

== Career ==
In 1944 Lodge became a secretary to a fashion house, she also did some modelling work. Her theatrical career started at Windsor Repertoire as an assistant manager. In 1948 Ealing Studios selected her to play a role in Saraband for Dead Lovers. The following year was the first of her three films from Hammer Film Productions, Dick Barton Strikes Back, where she played Tina, a secretary intimately involved with an arms dealer. The other two Hammer productions were The Case of the Missing Heiress (1949), and Death of an Angel (1952).

In 1952, she appeared alongside Claude Hulbert in the West End in Constance Cox's Lord Arthur Savile's Crime. In 1954 she starred in William Douglas Home's The Manor of Northstead.

Lodge played Guinevere in The Black Knight and Lady Netherden in The Hellfire Club.

== Personal life and death ==
Lodge had two children with Alfred Shaughnessy. They are actor Charles and producer/actor David. Charles is best known for his role as Maxwell Sheffield on The Nanny. She and her husband lived in a Georgian house in Hampshire. Alfred Shaughnessy died in 2005.

Lodge died on 5 August 2026, a day after her 99th birthday.

== Selected filmography ==
- Dick Barton Strikes Back (1949)
- Doctor Morelle (1949)
- Blackout (1950)
- White Corridors (1951)
- Death of an Angel (1952)
- Brandy for the Parson (1952)
- Glad Tidings (1953)
- Dangerous Voyage (1954)
- The Black Knight (1954)
- Johnny on the Spot (1954)
- Final Appointment (1954)
- The Hellfire Club (1961)
- Accidental Death (1963)
- The Eyes of Annie Jones (1964)
- Curse of Simba (1965)
- Invasion (1965)
