= Charles Shaughnessy =

British actor (born 1955)

The Right Honourable The Lord Shaughnessy
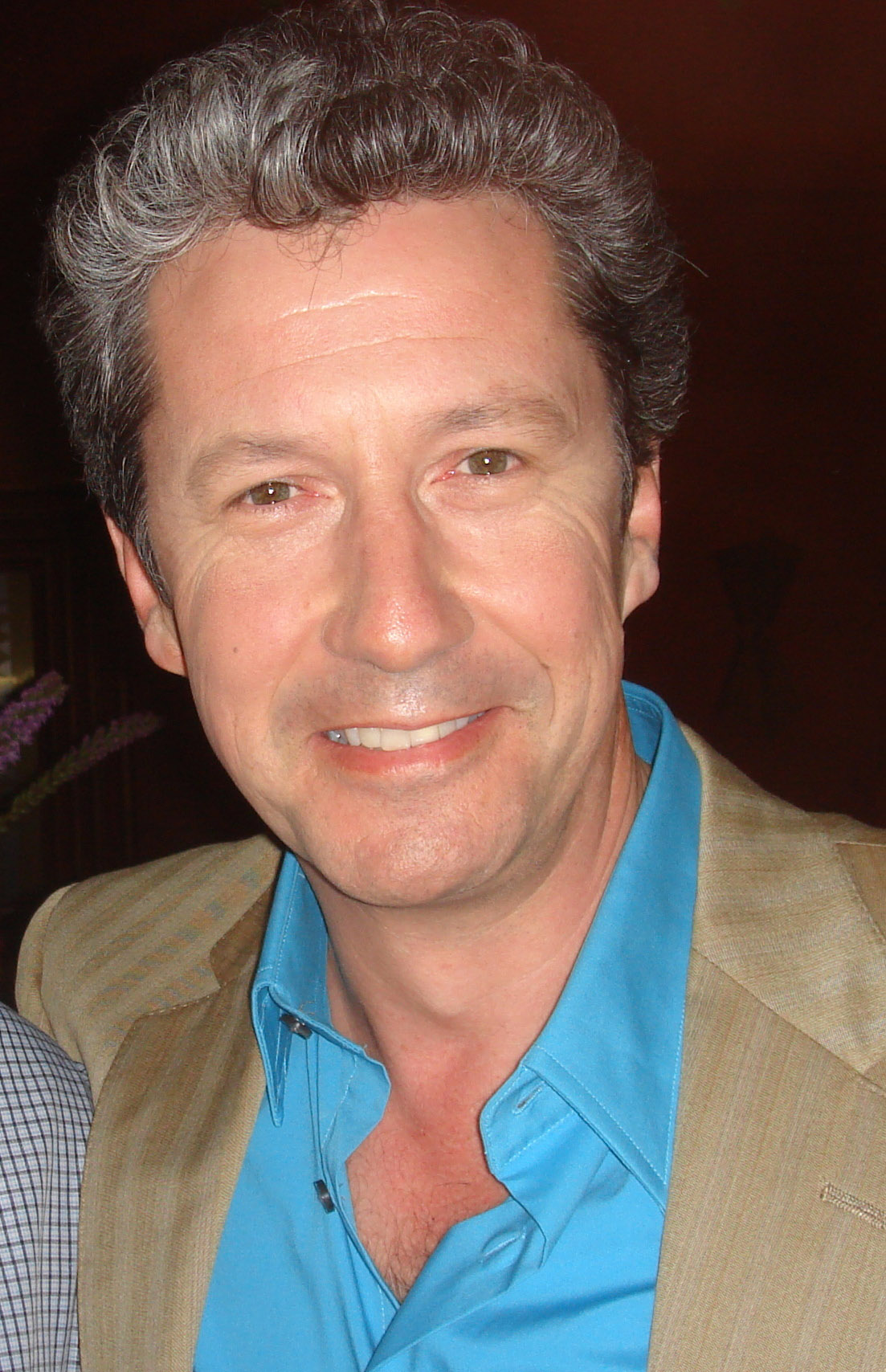
- Shaughnessy in 2007
- Born: Charles George Patrick Shaughnessy; 9 February 1955 (age 71); London, England
- Education: Magdalene College, Cambridge
- Occupation: Actor
- Years active: 1983–present
- Spouse: Susan Fallender (m. 1983)
- Children: 2
- Parents: Alfred Shaughnessy (father); Jean Lodge (mother)
- Relatives: David Shaughnessy (brother)

Charles George Patrick Shaughnessy, 5th Baron Shaughnessy (born 9 February 1955) is a British actor and hereditary peer. His roles on American television include Shane Donovan on the soap opera Days of Our Lives, Maxwell Sheffield on the sitcom The Nanny, and the voice of Dennis the Goldfish on Stanley for which he won a Daytime Emmy Award. He had recurring roles as Christopher Plover on The Magicians and St. John Powell on Mad Men. Shaughnessy was a series regular on ABC daytime soap opera General Hospital in the role of villain Victor Cassadine.

Along with his brother, David Shaughnessy, and Ophelia Soumekh, he is a partner in 3S Media Solutions Inc.

== Early life ==
Shaughnessy was born on 9 February 1955 in London, the son of Alfred Shaughnessy, a television writer who was the scriptwriter for Upstairs, Downstairs, and actress Jean Lodge. His brother, David Shaughnessy, is also an actor and a television producer and director. His great-grandfather Thomas Shaughnessy, the 1st Baron Shaughnessy, was an American–Canadian railway administrator. Charles inherited the title when his second cousin Michael (1946–2007), the 4th Baron Shaughnessy, died without issue.

Having been born into a show-business family, Shaughnessy started appearing in plays during primary school. After attending Eton College, he read for a law degree at Magdalene College, Cambridge, where he wrote a thesis on the House of Lords. While at Cambridge, he joined the Footlights club. After graduating, he decided to return to acting and enrolled in a London drama school, which led to his touring in a repertory company. He moved to the United States and married the actress Susan Fallender in 1983, with whom he has two daughters, Jenny (born 1990) and Maddy (born 1995).

== Career ==
Shaughnessy appeared as Shane Donovan on the soap opera Days of Our Lives from 1984 to 1992. His character's romance with Patsy Pease's character, Kimberly Brady, made the duo into a soap supercouple and revived interest in Days among teenage viewers in the 1980s. In 1986, he appeared with Betty White and Bert Convy on Super Password, and in January 1993, Shaughnessy appeared in an episode of Murphy Brown as the title character's date to the inaugural ball.

Shaughnessy portrayed Maxwell Sheffield opposite Fran Drescher on CBS's The Nanny from 1993 to 1999. He and Drescher resumed acting together in Drescher's next sitcom, Living with Fran, wherein Shaughnessy appeared fairly frequently as her philandering but needy ex-husband, Ted. Living with Fran was cancelled on 17 May 2006, after two seasons.

In 1996, Shaughnessy reunited with another Days of Our Lives co-star—Charlotte Ross, who portrayed Shane's daughter, Eve Donovan—in the TV movie A Kiss So Deadly. Ross played the roommate of Shaughnessy's daughter (Dedee Pfeiffer); Shaughnessy's character, although married, forms an obsessive, Lolita-esque relationship with Ross. When she tries to break it off, Shaughnessy's character murders Ross's character; gradually, his daughter uncovers the truth.

Shaughnessy appeared (in a dual role) in the Disney Channel 2002 made-for-TV movie Get a Clue. He was also in the 2000 made-for-TV Halloween movie Mom's Got a Date with a Vampire starring Caroline Rhea; she guest-starred on The Nanny in 1998 as part of a cross-over with Hollywood Squares. That same year, Shaughnessy made two appearances on The WB's Sabrina (starring Rhea, Melissa Joan Hart, and Beth Broderick), playing two different characters. He played Alec Colson in the 8th-season episode "Covenant" of Stargate SG-1. He also voiced Dr. Quintaine in the PC game Freelancer.

Shaughnessy appeared on an episode of NBC's Law & Order: Special Victims Unit and is also the voice of Dennis the Goldfish on the Disney Channel cartoon series Stanley. On 11 May 2002, Shaughnessy won a Daytime Emmy Award for Outstanding Performer in an Animated Program for his portrayal of Dennis.

On 8 August 2008, Shaughnessy portrayed the murder victim (Samuel, Guru) in Murder 101: The Locked Room Mystery. As of September 2008, his voice was heard in television commercials for Range Rover cars. In December 2008, he provided the voice of Pietro in The Tale of Despereaux. He also portrayed the Cockney English accent for "The Boss" in the game Saints Row 2.

On 5 May 2009, Shaughnessy made a guest appearance in the series The Mentalist episode "Miss Red" as the manager of a private club. He also appeared on the popular TV show Hannah Montana as a talent show judge modeled after Simon Cowell in the episode "Judge Me Tender".

Shaughnessy returned to Days of Our Lives in May 2010, in a storyline associated with the funeral of Alice Horton (played by Frances Reid), briefly reuniting him with his former co-star Patsy Pease (Kimberly). This plot development was necessitated by the real-world death of the actress who had long portrayed Mrs. Horton, as the producers were aware that the audience would not accept the portrayal of the character by anyone else.

In August–September 2010, Shaughnessy appeared as King Arthur in Monty Python's Spamalot! at The Ogunquit Playhouse in Ogunquit, Maine. In January 2011, he won the Broadway World Boston Theater Award for Best Lead Actor in a Musical (Large Theater). Since 2010, Shaughnessy has starred on the soap opera web series The Bay as Elliot Sanders. On 6 December 2010, he reunited with Fran Drescher as a guest on her limited-run daytime show, The Fran Drescher Show.

In June 2011, Shaughnessy appeared as Henry Higgins in My Fair Lady at the North Shore Music Theatre in Beverly, Massachusetts, and returned there to play Georges in La Cage aux Folles in fall 2013 . He made a guest appearance on the first-season finale of Fran Drescher's TV Land sitcom, Happily Divorced, first airing on 17 August 2011.

Shaughnessy returned to Days of Our Lives for a limited run in May 2012 as Shane Donovan, in a storyline involving his return to the ISA and interacting with Hope and Bo Brady and Stefano DiMera. His co-star Patsy Pease did not appear as Shane's wife, Kimberly, in this story arc; nor did Charlotte Ross, who had played Shane's daughter, Eve. He also returned in November 2013 for a three-episode arc, in which Shane and Kimberly deal with their daughter's drug use.

On 23 January 2014, it was announced that Shaughnessy would assume the lead role in the play Harvey at the New Theatre in Overland Park, Kansas, after original star Judge Reinhold was "offered the opportunity to leave the production".

In August 2014, Shaughnessy made a guest appearance on the Disney Channel show Dog with a Blog as business tycoon Tom Fairbanks, a man who wanted to buy Stan, the title character, and use him as the spokes-dog for his animal rescue campaign.

== Filmography ==
=== Television and film ===
Year	Title	Role	Notes
1983	Jury	Julian Spears	13 episodes
1983	Agatha Christie's Partners in Crime	John Rennie	Episode: "The Affair of the Pink Pearl"
1984–1992, 2002, 2010, 2012–2013, 2016–2017, 2023	Days of Our Lives	Shane Donovan / Drew Donovan (1988–1989, 2017)	Main role, 1,177 episodes
1989	Til We Meet Again	Armand Sadowski	TV miniseries
1993	Mad About You	Michael	Episode: "Swept Away"
1993	Murphy Brown	Michael	Episode: "Back to the Ball"
1993–1999	The Nanny	Maxwell Sheffield	Main role, 146 episodes
1994–1995	Duckman	Wolfgang Cracker	Recurring role: 4 episodes
1996	A Kiss So Deadly	Tom Deese	TV film
1996	Everything to Gain	Andrew Keswick	TV film
1996	Can't Hurry Love	Maxwell Sheffield	Episode: "The Rent Strike"
1998	Second Chances	Dr. Hugh Olson	
1999	Hey Arnold!	Scott the Golf Pro (voice)	Episode: "Grudge Match"
2000	Mom's Got a Date with a Vampire	Dimitri Denatos	TV film
2000–2001	Sabrina, the Teenage Witch	Alec / James Hexton	2 episodes
2001	The Painting	Randolph Barrington III	
2001–2004	Stanley	Dennis the Goldfish (voice)	Main role, 60 episodes
2002	Get a Clue	Detective Meaney / Falco	TV film
2002	Liberty's Kids	George III (voice)	Recurring role: 5 episodes
2004	Stargate SG-1	Alec Colson	Episode: "Covenant"
2005	All Grown Up!	Airline Rep (voice)	Episode: "The Finster Who Stole Christmas"
2005	Kids in America	Sergeant Carmichael	
2005	Stanley's Dinosaur Round-Up	Dennis (voice)	TV film
2005	Mystery Woman: Vision of a Murder	Dr. Drummond	TV film
2005–2006	Living with Fran	Ted Reeves	Recurring role: 7 episodes
2006	National Lampoon's Dorm Daze 2: College @ Sea	Professor Rex Cavendish	
2006	Veronica Mars	Budd Rose	Episode: "Lord of the Pi's"
2006	Law & Order: Special Victims Unit	Martin Trenway	Episode: "Recall"
2007	Saints & Sinners	August Martin	Main role, 62 episodes
2008	Polar Opposites	David	TV film
2008	The Tale of Despereaux	Pietro (voice)	
2008–2009	Mad Men	St. John Powell	Recurring role: 5 episodes
2009	Hannah Montana	Byron	Episode: "Judge Me Tender"
2009	The Mentalist	Private Club Manager	Episode: "Miss Red"
2009	The Wishing Well	Bosley	TV film
2009	The Marvelous Misadventures of Flapjack	Mr. Pants (voice)	Episode: "Fancy Pants"
2010	CSI: NY	Mr. Christensen	Episode: "Sanguine Love"
2010	The Suite Life on Deck	Jean-Claude Benoit	Episode: "Rollin' With the Holmies"
2010–2014	The Bay	Capt. Elliot Sanders	Recurring role: 15 episodes
2011	Ricky and Ravi (Are in Between Jobs)	Richard Paddle	Short film
2011	Your Highness	Narrator / Soul of the Maze	
2011	William & Kate: The Movie	Flight Instructor	TV film
2011	Happily Divorced	Gregory Sherwood	Episode: "Torn Between Two Lovetts"
2011	Love's Christmas Journey	Mr. Weaver	TV film
2012	Castle	Nigel Wyndham	Episode: "The Limey"
2012	Scooby-Doo! Mystery Incorporated	Ned Fussbuster / Creepy Voice (voice)	Episode: "The Hodag of Horror"
2012	Victorious	Mason Thornesmith	2 episodes
2012	Liz & Dick	Anthony Asquith	TV film
2013	This Magic Moment	Doyle Duncan	TV film
2013–2014	Sullivan & Son	Darryl	Recurring role: 2 episodes
2014	Audrey	Jacques	
2014	Super Fun Night	Rupert Royce	Episode: "...Till the Fat Lady Sings"
2014	Moontrap: Target Earth	Richard Kontral	
2014	My Dad Is Scrooge	Judge	
2014	Dog with a Blog	Tom Fairbanks	Episode: "The Mutt and the Mogul"
2014	Revenge	Charles Dawson	Episode: "Ambush"
2016–2019	The Magicians	Christopher Plover	Recurring role: 6 episodes
2017	NCIS	Balthazar Kilmeany	Episode: "The Tie That Binds"
2017	Good Behavior	Royce Jasper	Episode: "It's No Fun If It's Easy"
2017	My Christmas Prince	King Frederick	TV film
2018	Ghosted	Kenneth Lenier	2 episodes
2018	Danger One	Akkerman	
2018	The Cool Kids	Murray	Episode: "Thanksgiving At Murray's"
2018	Christmas with a Prince	King Edward	TV film
2018	Buttons: A Christmas Tale	Mr. Browning	
2019	Harry & Meghan: Becoming Royal	Prince Charles	TV film
2019	Modern Family	Dr. Stieglitz	Episode: "Yes-Woman"
2019	Christmas with a Prince: Becoming Royal	King Edward	TV film
2019–2020	Just Roll with It	Sir Liam Gooch	Recurring role: 3 episodes
2021–2023	General Hospital	Victor Cassadine	Recurring role
2021	Days of Our Lives: Beyond Salem	Shane Donovan / Drew Donovan	TV miniseries
2021	Christmas with a Prince: The Royal Baby	King Edward	TV film
2021	The Magic	Tom Kane	
2022	Driven	Andy Westin	Recurring role: 6 episodes
2023	The Winchesters	Jack Wilcox	Episode: "Suspicious Minds"
2025	The Irrational	Charles Earl Raclette	Episode: "Now You Don't"

=== Video games ===
Year	Title	Role	Notes
2003	Freelancer	Professor Roland Quintain	
2006	Saints Row	Radio Voice	
2008	Saints Row 2	Male Character English Voice	
2008	White Knight Chronicles: International Edition	Eldore	
2010	White Knight Chronicles II	Eldore	
2011	Homefront		
2012	Kingdoms of Amalur: Reckoning	Cydan, Additional Voices	

== Awards and nominations ==
=== Soap Opera Digest Awards ===
- Won, 1985, for Outstanding New Actor in a Daytime Serials
- Won, 1986, for Favorite Daytime Super Couple on a Daytime Serial (shared with Patsy Pease)
- Won, 1988, for Outstanding Super Couple: Daytime (shared with Patsy Pease)
- Nominated, 1990, for Outstanding Super Couple: Daytime (shared with Patsy Pease)
- Nominated, 1991, for Outstanding Hero: Daytime
- Nominated, 1992, for Outstanding Lead Actor: Daytime

=== Daytime Emmy Awards ===
- Won, 2002, for Outstanding Performer in an Animated Program (Stanley)

=== Broadway World Boston Theater Awards ===
- Won, 2011, for Best Lead Actor in a Musical (Large Theater)

== Arms ==
Coat of arms of Charles Shaughnessy
Coronet A Coronet of a Baron Crest Issuing from an Antique Crown Or a Dexter Cubit Arm in Armour and gauntleted grasping a Two-headed Battle-axe all proper Escutcheon Per fess Gules and Azure in chief two Mill-rinds and in base an Ancient Harp Or within a Bordure engrailed Ermine Supporters Dexter: an Irish Wolfhound proper gorged with a Collar Argent charged with three Trefoils Vert; Sinister: a Beaver proper gorged with a Collar Argent charged with three Maple Leaves Gules Motto Manu Forti (With a strong hand)

== See also ==
- Canadian Hereditary Peers

Peerage of the United Kingdom
Preceded by Michael Shaughnessy	Baron Shaughnessy; 2007–present	Incumbent; Heir presumptive: David Shaughnessy
