= John F. Smith (writer) =

American soap opera writer and producer

John F. Smith is an American soap opera writer and producer. Smith, formerly a member of Writers Guild of America West, left and maintained financial core status during the 2007–08 Writers Guild of America strike.

Smith is best known for his stints as head writer of The Bold and the Beautiful and The Young and the Restless. Prior to Smith's tenure on Y&R, there was a period of widespread audience erosion. When John Smith was producer, ratings increased substantially by over 2 million viewers. Most of the decrease occurred in 2004 when Smith co-wrote the show with longtime Y&R scribe, Kay Alden.

== Positions held ==
The Bold and the Beautiful

- Script Writer: January 22, 2008 – December 11, 2018
- Breakdown Writer: January 22, 2008 – December 11, 2018
- Executive Story Consultant: June 17, 2002 – May 30, 2003
- Associate Head Writer: March 26, 1987 - June 14, 2002, July 15, 2002, July 22, 2002, July 25-26, 2002

The Young and the Restless

- Co-Executive Producer: June 25, 2003- May 12, 2006
- Co-Head Writer: May 6, 2002 - November 10, 2006
- Associate Head Writer: February 22, 1982 - May 3, 2002
- Script Writer: December 10, 1979 - February 19, 1982

== Awards and nominations ==
Smith has been nominated for and won numerous Daytime Emmy, Writers Guild of America, and Producers Guild of America Awards.

== Head Writing Tenure ==
Preceded by Kay Alden; Trent Jones	Head Writer of The Young and the Restless (with Kay Alden) (with Trent Jones: December 23, 2002 - August 5, 2004); (with Lynn Marie Latham: February 16, 2006 - November 10, 2006); December 23, 2002 - November 10, 2006	Succeeded by Lynn Marie Latham; Kay Alden; Scott Hamner

== Executive Producing Tenure ==
Preceded by William J. Bell; David Shaughnessy	Executive Producer of The Young and the Restless (with William J. Bell: June 25, 2003 - April 29, 2005) (with David Shaughnessy: June 25, 2003- January 9, 2004); June 25, 2003 – May 12, 2006	Succeeded by Lynn Marie Latham; Josh Griffith
