= Birds of a Feather (2019 film) =

- Film poster
- Directed by: Christian Haas; Andrea Block
- Written by: Axel Melzener, Andrea Block, Phil Parker, Christian Haas
- Produced by: Andrea Block; Christian Haas; Gudrun Moritz; Stefan Reissmann; Michael Roesch; Solveig Langeland
- Starring: Kate Winslet; Willem Dafoe; Josh Keaton; Cassandra Steen; David Shaughnessy
- Music by: Frank Schreiber; Steffen Wick
- Production company: LUXX Film
- Distributed by: Sola Media
- Release date: 28 February 2019
- Running time: 90 minutes
- Country: Germany
- Language: English
- Budget: $9.5 million
- Box office: $4.4 million

Birds of a Feather (also known as Manou the Swift or Swift) is a 2019 English-language German animated adventure comedy film directed by Christian Haas and Andrea Block. The film features the voices of Kate Winslet, Willem Dafoe, Josh Keaton, Cassandra Steen and David Shaughnessy.

== Cast ==
- Kate Winslet as Blanche, Yves' wife who is the first to discover Manou and take him in
- Willem Dafoe as Yves, the strong-willed but stubborn leader of the seagull colony
- Josh Keaton as Manou, an orphaned Swift who was adopted and raised by seagulls
- Cassandra Steen as Kalifa, a female Swift and Manou's love interest
- Mikey Kelley as Luc, Manou's adoptive brother with whom he shares a strong bond
- David Shaughnessy as Percival, a flightless bird who lives in a cemetery, and frequently hangs around with the Swifts
- Arif S. Kinchen as Poncho, a short, fat Swift and one of Kalifa's brothers
- Nolan North as Yusuf, a slim, taller Swift and one of Kalifa's brothers
- Julie Nathanson as Francoise, a student at the sailing school and a rival of Manou
- Rob Paulsen as Sandpipers

== Plot ==
The film follows the adventures of Manou, a swift who was raised by seagulls and struggles to fit in with them, as well as his journey to accepting his identity as a swift, fighting rats and earning the respect of seagulls and swifts alike.
