= Baron Shaughnessy =

Barony in the Peerage of the United Kingdom

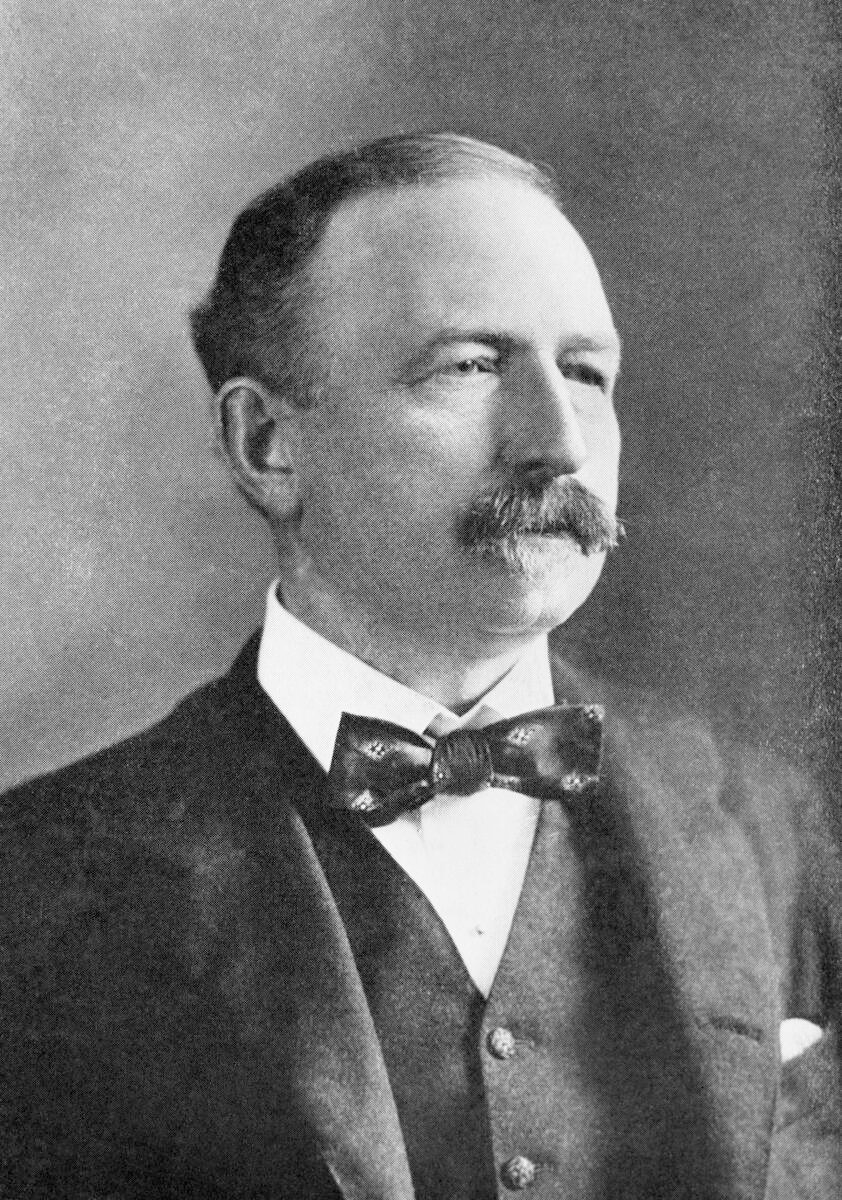
Thomas Shaughnessy, 1st Baron Shaughnessy

Baron Shaughnessy, of the City of Montreal in the Dominion of Canada and of Ashford in the County of Limerick, is a title in the Peerage of the United Kingdom. It was created in 1916 for the Milwaukee-born businessman Thomas Shaughnessy, president of the Canadian Pacific Railway Company. He was succeeded by his eldest son, the second Baron, a Director of the CPR and of the Canadian Bank of Commerce. His son, the third Baron, was a businessman and was also active in the House of Lords. However, he lost his hereditary seat in parliament after the House of Lords Act 1999.

The line of the eldest son of the first Baron failed on the death of the third Baron's son, the fourth Baron, in 2007. The late Baron was succeeded by his second cousin, the fifth Baron and present Lord Shaughnessy, who is better known as the actor Charles Shaughnessy, star of the American TV comedy The Nanny and the soap opera Days of Our Lives. The fifth Baron's late father was Alfred Shaughnessy, a scriptwriter and producer, and son of the Hon. Alfred Shaughnessy, younger son of the first Baron. The heir presumptive to the title is David Shaughnessy, younger brother of the fifth Baron, an actor and producer. No other heir exists, and the fifth baron and his younger brother only have daughters who are not eligible for succession to the title.

== Barons Shaughnessy (1916) ==
- Thomas George Shaughnessy, 1st Baron Shaughnessy (1853–1923)
- William James Shaughnessy, 2nd Baron Shaughnessy (1883–1938)
- William Graham Shaughnessy, 3rd Baron Shaughnessy (1922–2003)
- Michael James Shaughnessy, 4th Baron Shaughnessy (1946–2007)
- Charles George Patrick Shaughnessy, 5th Baron Shaughnessy (b. 1955)

The heir presumptive is the present holder's younger brother David James Bradford Shaughnessy (b. 1957).

There are no further heirs.

== Line of Succession ==
- Thomas George Shaughnessy, 1st Baron Shaughnessy (1853–1923)
  - William James Shaughnessy, 2nd Baron Shaughnessy (1883–1938)
    - William Graham Shaughnessy, 3rd Baron Shaughnessy (1922–2003)
      - Michael James Shaughnessy, 4th Baron Shaughnessy (1946–2007)
  - Hon. Alfred Thomas Shaughnessy (1887–1916)
    - Alfred James Shaughnessy (1916–2005)
      - Charles George Patrick Shaughnessy, 5th Baron Shaughnessy (born 1955)
      - (1) David James Bradford Shaughnessy (b. 1957)

== Arms ==
Coat of arms of Baron Shaughnessy
Coronet A Coronet of a Baron Crest Issuing from an Antique Crown Or a Dexter Cubit Arm in Armour and gauntleted grasping a Two-headed Battle-axe all proper Escutcheon Per fess Gules and Azure in chief two Mill-rinds and in base an Ancient Harp Or within a Bordure engrailed Ermine Supporters Dexter: an Irish Wolfhound proper gorged with a Collar Argent charged with three Trefoils Vert; Sinister: a Beaver proper gorged with a Collar Argent charged with three Maple Leaves Gules Motto Manu Forti (With a strong hand)

== See also ==
- Canadian Hereditary Peers
- O'Shaughnessy
- Uí Fiachrach Aidhne
- Cenél Áeda na hEchtge
- List of Bishop's College School alumni
