= Arthur Hewlett =

British actor (1907–1997)

- Born: Arthur Reginald Hewlett; 12 March 1907; Southampton, Hampshire, England
- Died: 25 February 1997 (aged 89); Camden, London, England
- Spouse(s): Beryl Johnstone (1947–??); Margaret Denyer (1964 - 1997) (his death)

Arthur Reginald Hewlett (12 March 1907 – 25 February 1997) was a British actor.

Hewlett made his stage debut in 1930 at Plymouth Rep, and his theatre work included the original British production of George Bernard Shaw's Buoyant Billions at the Malvern Festival in 1949. In 1954 he appeared in the West End in William Douglas Home's political comedy The Manor of Northstead.

He is perhaps best remembered for his roles on television, including Quatermass and the Pit, Police Surgeon, The Avengers, The Saint, No Hiding Place, The Baron, The Troubleshooters, Follyfoot, The Changes, Blake's 7, Doctor Who (in the serials State of Decay and Terror of the Vervoids), Shoestring, Juliet Bravo, The Black Adder and Moondial. Arthur Hewlett also played Dr Grant in Emmerdale Farm in 1973, and the part of Mr Medwin in an episode of Doctor At Large entitled "Where There's A Will".

== Filmography ==
Year	Title	Role	Notes
1951	Calling Bulldog Drummond	Department Store manager who raises the alarm	Uncredited
1954	Eight O'Clock Walk	Reynolds	Uncredited
1954	Delayed Action	Battersby	Uncredited
1955	The Time of His Life	Prison Governor	
1960	The Price of Silence	Police Commissioner	Uncredited
1960	The Gentle Trap	Sam	
1960	The Professionals	Hoskins	
1961	The Third Alibi	Marshall	
1962	Reach for Glory	Vicar	
1962	Dilemma	Piano Tuner	
1962	The War Lover	Vicar	
1965	City Under the Sea	First Fisherman	Uncredited
1965	The Secret of My Success	Rev. William Haversmith	Uncredited
1967	Three Bites of the Apple	Alfred Guffy	
1967	A Challenge for Robin Hood	Edwin, the castle steward	
1968	A Dandy in Aspic	Moon	Uncredited
1968	Prudence and the Pill	Mr. Ferguson (Chemist)	Uncredited
1969	The Assassination Bureau	Counterman at Lowe's	Uncredited
1971	The Night Visitor	Pop	
1972	The Pied Piper	Otto	
1973	Diamonds on Wheels	Benjy	
1974	The Best of Benny Hill		
1974	Man About the House	Elderly man	
1975	Love Among the Ruins	The Usher	TV movie
1975	One of Our Dinosaurs Is Missing	Old Gatekeeper	Uncredited
1977	The Prince and the Pauper	Fat Man	
1981	Lady Killers	Mr. Biffen	Episode: "A Boy's Best Friend"
1987	Personal Services	Mr. Francis	
1987	Little Dorrit	Physician	
1988	The Love Child	Stan	
