= The Manor of Northstead =

1954 play

- Original language: English
- Written by: William Douglas Home
- Genre: Comedy

Premiere
- Date: 15 March 1954
- Place: Theatre Royal, Nottingham

The Manor of Northstead is a 1954 comedy play by the British writer William Douglas Home. It is a sequel to his 1947 hit The Chiltern Hundreds. The title refers to the Manor of Northstead.

It premiered at the Theatre Royal, Nottingham before transferring to the Duchess Theatre in London's West End where it ran for 307 performances between 28 April 1954 and 22 January 1955. The original London cast included A.E. Matthews, Jean Lodge, Marie Lohr, Charles Heslop, Bryan Coleman, Ronald Adam, Arthur Hewlett and Viola Lyel.

== Original cast ==
- Beecham - Charles Heslop
- Captain Lord Pym, MC (Tony) - Bryan Coleman
- Lady Cleghorn (Caroline) - Viola Lyel
- Lady Pym (June) - Jean Lodge
- Lady Pym (June) (Replacement) - Anne Rawsthorne
- Lord Cleghorn - Ronald Adam
- Mrs Beecham (Bessie) - Lorraine Clewes
- Sir Ronald MacRonald - Arthur Hewlett
- The Countess of Lister - Marie Lohr
- The Earl of Lister - A. E. Matthews

== Bibliography ==
- Wearing, J.P. The London Stage 1950-1959: A Calendar of Productions, Performers, and Personnel. Rowman & Littlefield, 2014.
