= Scott Hamner =

American television writer

Scott Hamner (born May 11, 1956), is an American television writer. He is the son of Earl Hamner Jr., who turned his autobiography into The Waltons.

== Positions held ==
- The Homecoming: A Christmas Story (Actor, television movie: 1971)
- Berrenger's (Writer, 2 episodes: 1985)
- Boone (Writer, 2 episodes: 1983–84)
- Dynasty (Story and/or writer and/or teleplay and/or story editor: Season 6, 1985–86)
- Falcon Crest (Writer, 4 episodes: 1982–86)
- Knots Landing (Writer, 7 episodes: 1982–91. Story editor, 8 episodes: 1991)
- The Waltons (Writer, 3 episodes: 1981)
- Second Chances (Executive Story Editor, entire series: 1993–94)
- As the World Turns (Writer, Script Writer, 6 episodes: 1995)
- Port Charles (Writer, Associate Head Writer, Head Writer: 1997–2000)
- The Young and the Restless (Story and/or writer, Co-Head writer: 2006–12)

== Awards and nominations ==
Hamner, as part of the writing teams that he has worked with, has been nominated six times (As the World Turns: 1996, The Young and the Restless: 2007–08 and 2010–12) for a Daytime Emmy Award in the category Drama Series Writing Team, winning the Emmy in 2011.

Hamner and his writing colleagues were also nominated five times (The Young and the Restless: 2007–08, 2010 and 2012–13) for a Writers Guild of America Award in the category Daytime Serials, winning the award in 2008, 2010 and 2013.

| Preceded by Lynn Marie Latham | Head Writer of Port Charles; May 7, 1999 – February 3, 2000 | Succeeded by Karen Harris; Jonathon Estrin |
| Preceded by Lynn Marie Latham; Kay Alden; John F. Smith | Co-Head Writer of The Young and the Restless (with Lynn Marie Latham: 10/26/06-12/22/07) (with Kay Alden: 10/26/06-12/22/06) (with John F. Smith: 10/26/06-11/10/06); October 26, 2006 - December 22, 2007 | Succeeded by Josh Griffith; Maria Arena Bell |
| Preceded by Josh Griffith; Maria Arena Bell | Co-Head Writer of The Young and the Restless (with Maria Arena Bell) (with Josh Griffith: 04/15/08-04/21/08); April 15 - May 8, 2008 | Succeeded by Maria Arena Bell |
| Preceded by Maria Arena Bell; Hogan Sheffer | Co-Head Writer of The Young and the Restless (with Hogan Sheffer) (with Maria Arena Bell:8/11/08-10/22/12) (with Josh Griffith: 10/22/12-11/2/12); August 11, 2008 - November 2, 2012 | Succeeded by Josh Griffith; Hogan Sheffer |
