= Death of an Angel =

1952 British film by Charles Saunders

- Opening titles
- Directed by: Charles Saunders
- Written by: Frank King (story); Reginald Long (screenplay)
- Produced by: Anthony Hinds
- Starring: Patrick Barr; Jane Baxter; Jean Lodge
- Cinematography: Walter J. Harvey
- Edited by: John Ferris
- Music by: Frank Spencer
- Production company: Hammer Films
- Distributed by: Exclusive Films
- Release date: February 1952; (UK)
- Running time: 64 minutes
- Country: United Kingdom
- Language: English

Death of an Angel is a 1952 British 'B' crime drama directed by Charles Saunders and starring Patrick Barr, Jane Baxter and Jean Lodge. The screenplay was by Reginald Long, based on an original story called This is Mary's Chair by Dr. Frank King. It was filmed at Bray Studios 2 – 27 April 1951. It was trade shown at the Hammer Theatre on 17 January 1952, and opened in February.

== Plot ==
Dr. Welling, a doctor in a small rural town who has been suffering ill-health, asks young Dr. Boswell to move there and become a partner in his medical practice. Later, Dr. Welling's wife is poisoned, and Welling becomes a suspect. Dr. Boswell attempts to find out who killed her, and discovers that Dr. Welling is innocent. He had suspected that his wife was poisoning him in their nightly glasses of milk, and one evening swaps the glasses. When he returns from a night call, he finds his wife on the verge of death, sends her to the hospital, then goes on the run. Eventually it emerges that it was not his wife who was poisoning him, and another life is placed in danger before the real killer is discovered and falls to their death while being pursued by the police.

== Cast ==
- Patrick Barr as Robert Welling
- Jane Baxter as Mary Welling
- Julie Somers as Judy Welling
- Raymond Young as Chris Boswell
- Jean Lodge as Ann Marlow
- Russell Waters as Walter Grannage
- Russell Napier as Supt. Walshaw
- James Mills as Howard
- Frank Tickle as Sam Oddy
- Katie Johnson as Sarah Oddy
- Robert Brown as Jim Pollard
- John Kelly as PC Janes
- Hal Osmond as railway porter
- June Bardsley as nurse
- David Stoll as plainclothesman
- Duggie Ascot as taxi driver

== Critical reception ==
The Monthly Film Bulletin wrote: "Although sometimes disjointed in development, and not too well acted, this murder story manages to sustain a certain suspense."

Picture Show wrote: "Well staged, efficiently directed and acted thriller."

In British Sound Films: The Studio Years 1928–1959 David Quinlan rated the film as "average", writing: "Some suspense; rather slow for a short film."
