= The Young and the Restless =

American daytime television soap opera (since 1973)

- Also known as: Y&R
- Genre: Soap opera
- Created by: William J. Bell; Lee Phillip Bell
- Written by: Various (currently Dan O'Connor and Jamey Giddens)
- Directed by: Various
- Starring: Present cast Former cast
- Opening theme: "Nadia's Theme" by Barry De Vorzon and Perry Botkin Jr.
- Country of origin: United States
- Original language: English
- No. of episodes: 13,000

Production
- Executive producer: Various (currently Sally McDonald)
- Producer: Various
- Production locations: Television City; Los Angeles, California
- Camera setup: Multi-camera
- Running time: 22 to 24 minutes (1973–1980); 37 minutes (1980–present)
- Production companies: Bell Dramatic Serial Company; Corday Productions; Sony Pictures Television (Note: Credited as Screen Gems (1973–1974), Columbia Pictures Television (1974–2000), Columbia TriStar Television (2000–2001) and Columbia TriStar Domestic Television (2001–2002).)

Original release
- Network: CBS
- Release: March 26, 1973 – present

Related
- As the World Turns; Beyond the Gates; The Bold and the Beautiful; The King of Queens

The Young and the Restless (often abbreviated as Y&R) is an American television soap opera created by William J. Bell and Lee Phillip Bell for CBS. The show is set in the fictional Genoa City (named after the real-life Genoa City, Wisconsin). First broadcast on March 26, 1973, The Young and the Restless was originally broadcast as half-hour episodes, five times a week. The show expanded to one-hour episodes on February 4, 1980. On March 17, 2006, the series began airing previous episodes weeknights on Soapnet until its closure on December 31, 2013, after which the series moved to TVGN (now Pop). From July 1, 2013 until 2019, Pop aired previous episodes on weeknights. The series is also syndicated internationally.

The Young and the Restless originally focused on two core families: the wealthy Brooks family and the working class Foster family. After a series of recasts and departures in the early 1980s, all the original characters except Jill Foster Abbott were written out, to be replaced by new core families, the Abbotts and the Williamses. Over the years, other families such as the Newman family, the Barber/Winters family, and the Baldwin-Fishers were introduced. Despite these changes, one of its most enduring storylines was the four-decade feud between Jill Abbott and Katherine Chancellor, the longest rivalry on any American soap opera.

Since its television debut, The Young and the Restless has won 11 Daytime Emmy Awards for Outstanding Drama Series. It is also currently the highest-rated daytime drama on American television, a rank it has held for 34 years as of the end of the 2021–22 season. As of 2008, it had appeared at the top of the weekly Nielsen ratings in that category for more than 1,000 weeks since 1988. As of December 12, 2013, according to Nielsen ratings, The Young and the Restless marked an unprecedented 1,300 weeks, or 25 years, as the highest-rated daytime drama. The serial is also a sister series to The Bold and the Beautiful, as several actors have crossed over between shows. The serial aired its 13,000th episode on November 13, 2024. On February 27, 2024, the series was renewed by CBS to run through the 2027–2028 television season.

Some well-known celebrities got their start on The Young and the Restless, including Eva Longoria, David Hasselhoff, Tom Selleck, Paul Walker, and Shemar Moore. Many other celebrities have made guest appearances on the show, including Katy Perry, Lionel Richie, Wayne Gretzky, Il Divo, and Enrique Iglesias.

== History ==
To compete with the youthful ABC soap operas, All My Children, One Life to Live, and General Hospital, CBS executives wanted a new daytime serial that was youth oriented. William J. Bell and Lee Phillip Bell created The Young and the Restless in 1972 for the network under the working title, The Innocent Years! "We were confronted with the very disturbing reality that young America had lost much of its innocence," Bell said. "Innocence as we had known and lived it all our lives had, in so many respects, ceased to exist." They changed the title of the series to The Young and the Restless because they felt it "reflected the youth and mood of the early seventies". The Bells named the fictional setting for the show after the real Genoa City, Wisconsin, a community on U.S. Route 12 in Wisconsin along the Illinois-Wisconsin state line located between their then-home in Chicago and their annual summer vacation spot in Lake Geneva.

The Young and the Restless began airing on March 26, 1973, replacing the canceled soap opera, Where the Heart Is. Bell worked as head writer from the debut of the series until his retirement in 1998. He wrote from his home in Chicago while production took place in Los Angeles, California. Originally, Bell wanted to shoot the series in New York City; however, CBS executives felt that Los Angeles would be more cost effective. John Conboy acted as the show's first executive producer, staying in the position until 1982. Bell and H. Wesley Kenney became co-executive producers that year, with Edward J. Scott assuming the position in 1989. Bell then became senior executive producer. Other executive producers included David Shaughnessy, John F. Smith, Lynn Marie Latham, Josh Griffith, Maria Arena Bell, and Paul Rauch.

In the mid-1980s, Bell and his family moved to Los Angeles to create a new soap opera. During this time, his three children, William Jr., Bradley Bell, and Lauralee Bell, each became involved in soap operas. Lauralee Bell worked as an actress on The Young and the Restless. Bradley Bell co-created The Bold and the Beautiful with his father. William Bell Jr. became involved in the family's production companies as president of Bell Dramatic Serial Co. and Bell-Phillip Television Productions Inc. "It's worked out very well for us because we really all worked in very different aspects of the show," William Bell Jr. said. "With my father and I, it was a great kind of partnership and pairing in the sense that he had a total control of the creative side of the show and I didn't have even the inclination to interject in what he was doing."

After William J. Bell's 1998 retirement, a number of different head writers took over the position, including Kay Alden, Trent Jones, John F. Smith, Lynn Marie Latham, Scott Hamner, Josh Griffith, Maria Arena Bell, and Hogan Sheffer.

In 2012, former General Hospital executive producer Jill Farren Phelps was hired as the new executive producer of the soap, replacing Bell. Griffith was also named the sole head writer. On August 15, 2013, it was speculated and reported by several online sources that Griffith had resigned as head-writer of the serial. Further speculation adds that Shelly Altman may take over as the new scribe, alongside Tracey Thomson or Jean Passanante may be brought aboard as co-head scribe. On September 12, 2013, it was announced that Passanante and Altman were named head writers of the show, with Thomson promoted to co-head writer.

On September 18, 2014, former All My Children, Santa Barbara and General Hospital head writer Charles Pratt Jr. was named as the new head writer of the show. Passanante, Altman and Thomson have been demoted to breakdown writers. Pratt was also named as co-executive producer sharing the credit with Phelps. On June 7, 2016, Serial Scoop announced that Phelps had been terminated from her position as executive producer; a replacement was not named at the time of their reporting. The following morning, Sony Pictures Television confirmed to several list of soap opera media outlets that Phelps had been let go from her position; British television producer Mal Young was announced as Phelps' replacement. Phelps' last appearance as executive producer was July 12, 2016, while Young's first appearance occurred the following day on July 13. On September 13, 2016, it was announced that Pratt was named as executive producer and show-runner of Lee Daniels' Star. The same day, Daytime Confidential revealed that former Generations and Days of Our Lives head writer Sally Sussman, who previously had positions with the show, such as Associate Head Writer, was in-talks to replace Pratt as Head Writer. On September 15, 2016, it was confirmed that Sussman was named as the soap's new head writer.

On September 21, 2016, Daytime Confidential reported that after ten years since leaving the soap, Alden had been re-hired to be a story consultant under Sussman's regime. Sussman's tenure as head writer began taping on October 20, 2016, and began airing on December 7, 2016. On June 20, 2017, CBS announced its decision to renew the serial for three years. On July 31, 2017, it was announced that both Alden and Sussman would retire from their positions; Young was named as Sussman's successor as head writer. Sussman last aired as head writer on October 24, 2017. Young's tenure as head writer aired on October 25, 2017. In December 2018, Young announced his decision to leave the serial, citing that it was a "good time to move on", and cited his desire to pursue his own project. Anthony Morina was announced as executive producer, while Griffith was named co-executive producer and head writer.

On January 30, 2020, CBS announced it had renewed the serial through 2024. In a statement, CBS Entertainment president Kelly Kahl stated: "It's a remarkable achievement and a testament to the extraordinary cast, gifted writers, talented producers and supremely passionate fans, as well as our tremendous partnership with [Y&R studio] Sony Pictures Television."

On March 20, 2020, after 32 years and over 1,500 consecutive weeks, The Young and the Restless was no longer the number-one soap opera in the United States, having been dethroned by The Bold and the Beautiful, which took 33 years since its 1987 debut to attain that position. The Young and the Restless then reclaimed the number-one spot the following week. On April 20, 2020, CBS announced plans to begin airing a week of vintage episodes, following the soap's shutdown, due to the COVID-19 pandemic; production on the soap would resume in the summer of 2020. On December 1 of the same year, the serial aired its 12,000th episode. On August 19, 2021, it was reported that actress Briana Thomas had filed a lawsuit against Sony Pictures Television and CBS Studios, alleging sexual harassment on the set from showrunner Tony Morina.

On September 29, 2022, a day before the premiere of The Young and the Restless’ 50th season, the show announced that they would be producing showcasts, an audio form of the show’s episodes. Episodes of the showcast will be available on Apple Podcasts, Spotify, Google Podcasts, and Stitcher.

On October 9, 2024, it was announced Scott would return to the soap as a senior producer. The serial aired its 13,000th episode on November 13 of the same year. In September 2025, it was announced long-time director Sally McDonald had been promoted to co-executive producer alongside Griffith.

In May 2026, it was announced that Griffith stepped down as executive producer to concentrate on his role as head writer. McDonald was appointed as the sole executive producer. The following month, it was revealed that Griffith had also resigned as head writer, although this decision was not immediately effective. In July 2026, it was announced Jamey Giddens and Dan O'Connor had been named as head writers. Their material began airing on November 11 of the same year.

== Production ==
=== Videotaping and broadcasting ===
Taped at CBS Television City, studios 41 and 43 in Hollywood since its debut on March 26, 1973, the show was packaged by the distribution company Columbia Pictures Television, which has now been replaced by Sony Pictures Television. The Young and the Restless originally aired as a half-hour series on CBS and was the first soap opera to focus on the visual aspects of production, creating "a look that broke with the visual conventions of the genre". Similar to the radio serials that had preceded them, soap operas at the time primarily focused on dialogue, characters, and story, with details like sets as secondary concerns. The Young and the Restless stood out by using unique lighting techniques and camera angles, similar to Hollywood-style productions. The style of videotaping included using out-of-the-ordinary camera angles and a large number of facial close-ups with bright lighting on the actors' faces. Conboy said he used lighting to create "artistic effects". Those effects made the series look dark, shadowy, and moody. The Young and the Restless' look influenced the taping styles of other soap operas. When H. Wesley Kenney replaced Conboy as executive producer, he balanced the lighting of the scenes.

Due to the success of the series, CBS and its affiliates pressured Bell to lengthen the series from 30 minutes to a full hour. Bell attributed the show's fall from number one in the Nielsen ratings to this change, since the lengthening of the show led to the departure of a number of cast members. "The issue of performing in a one-hour show had not been part of their contracts," Bell said. This forced the show to recast multiple main characters and eventually phase out the original core families in favor of new ones. The show expanded to one hour on February 4, 1980, replacing the long-running serial Love of Life, in a schedule shuffle with As the World Turns, Guiding Light and daytime reruns of One Day at a Time. On June 8, 1981, it moved to 12:30 p.m. Eastern, the slot occupied by Search for Tomorrow since its premiere in 1951, which ultimately led to the latter show moving to NBC after a disastrous experiment in another timeslot, alienating that program's loyal viewers. It airs 11:00 a.m. on most stations in the Central, Mountain and Pacific time zones, usually as a lead-in to local noon newscasts in most CBS stations outside the Eastern Time Zone (though some stations in the Central Time Zone opt to air it at 11:30 a.m.).

Exteriors used in the late 1980s and early 1990s (and reused years later) included locations in and around Pittsburgh, Pennsylvania, including Allegheny General Hospital, One Oxford Centre, the Duquesne Club, Hampton Township, Allegheny County, Pennsylvania and the state correctional institution - Pittsburgh. Phillip Chancellor died in the Richland, Pennsylvania area, where the police chief was not told and believed the accident really happened.

On June 27, 2001, The Young and the Restless became the first daytime soap opera to be broadcast in high-definition. In September 2011, its sister soap The Bold and the Beautiful became the last soap to make the transition from Standard-definition television to High-definition television before One Life to Live ended its ABC run on January 13, 2012, and began its TOLN run online on April 29, 2013. On April 24, 2006, Soapnet began airing same-day episodes of the series. The final airing on SoapNet was on June 28, 2013. The soap has moved from SoapNet to TV Guide Network. The same day episodes begin airing on TVGN (now Pop) weeknights on July 1, 2013.

== Development ==
The cast photo of The Young and the Restless, taken in celebration of the soap's 50th anniversary (2023). Front row (l-r): Christel Khalil, Bryton James, Sharon Case, Amelia Heinle, Joshua Morrow, Melody Thomas Scott, Eric Braeden, Peter Bergman, Eileen Davidson, Beth Maitland, Jason Thompson, Michelle Stafford, Jess Walton Middle row: Kate Linder, Melissa Claire Egan, Sean Dominic, Camryn Grimes, Mark Grossman, Lauralee Bell, Tracey E. Bregman, Christian LeBlanc, Susan Walters, Michael Mealor, Mishael Morgan, Michael Graziadei, Melissa Ordway Back row: Kelsey Wang, Conner Floyd, Cait Fairbanks, Courtney Hope, Brytni Sarpy, Trevor St. John, Greg Rikaart, Elizabeth Hendrickson, Rory Gibson, Zuleyka Silver, Allison Lanier

Co-creators William J. and Lee Phillip Bell centered The Young and the Restless around two core families, the wealthy Brooks' and the poor Fosters. Bell borrowed this technique of soap opera building from his mentor, Irna Phillips.

While casting for the series, Bell and executive producer John Conboy auditioned 540 actors for the 13 main characters. They assembled the youngest group of actors ever cast on a soap opera at the time, hiring mostly unknown actors whom they considered "glamorous model types". Chemistry between actors also factored into the criteria for casting. The stories focused on the younger characters, with an emphasis in fantasy. The fantasy element was reflected in the love story between Jill Foster and the millionaire Phillip Chancellor II; the Leslie Brooks, Brad Elliot, and Lorie Brooks love triangle; and Snapper Foster's romance with Chris Brooks.

When the series lengthened from a half-hour to an hour in 1980, multiple cast members who portrayed characters from the original core families departed because their contracts only bound them to performing in a half-hour show. A number of the characters were recast until one of the few remaining original actors, Jaime Lyn Bauer, who portrayed Lorie Brooks, decided to leave. When she announced her intention not to renew her contract, Bell decided to replace the original core families. "As I studied the remaining cast, I realized I had two characters- Paul Williams, played by Doug Davidson, and Jack Abbott, played by Terry Lester- both of whom had a relatively insignificant presence on the show," Bell said. "They didn't have families. Hell, they didn't even have bedrooms. But these became the two characters I would build our two families around."

The characters from the Abbott and Williams families were integrated into the series while the Brooks and Foster families, with the exception of Jill, were phased out. The continuity of the feud between Jill and Katherine, which began in the early years of the show, smoothed the transition. The relationship between the two characters remained a central theme throughout the series and became the longest lasting rivalry in daytime history.

Another character introduced in the 1980s was Eric Braeden's Victor Newman. Originally, the character was "a despicable, contemptible, unfaithful wife abuser" who was intended to be killed off. Braeden's tenure on the show was meant to last between eight and twelve weeks. "When I saw Eric Braeden's first performance- the voice, the power, the inner strength- I knew immediately that I didn't want to lose this man," Bell said. "He was exactly what the show needed. Not the hateful man we saw on-screen, but the man he could and would become." Bell rewrote the story to save the character and put Braeden on contract. Victor's romance with Nikki Reed became a prominent plot in the series.

With the success of another iconic character, Kimberlin Brown's Sheila Carter, Bell successfully crossed her over from The Young and the Restless to his second soap, The Bold and the Beautiful, in 1992. The success of the crossover was due to the creativity of Bell, as the nefarious character of Sheila was presumed to have died in a fire on The Young and the Restless.

In the 1990s, core black characters were introduced with the Barber and Winters families. Victoria Rowell (Drucilla Barber) and Tonya Williams (Olivia Winters) were cast as the nieces of the Abbotts' maid, Mamie Johnson, in 1990. The brothers Neil Winters (Kristoff St. John) and Malcolm Winters (Shemar Moore) were introduced as love interests for Olivia and Drucilla. The Young and the Restless became popular among black viewers, which Williams and St. John attributed to the writing for the black characters. "I play a CEO at a major corporation, that's something we don't see that often," St. John said. "And the show doesn't use the old African-American stereotypes that we have been seeing on TV, like the hustler, the pimp, the drug dealer. We have come a long way." Though the characters held prominent positions in the fictional work place of Genoa City, they had little interaction with other characters outside of their jobs.

In the 2000s, the serial shared several crossovers with As the World Turns. First, in 2005, Michael Baldwin (Christian LeBlanc) made a two-day guest appearance on As the World Turns, appearing as Keith Morrissey's (Kin Shriner) attorney. Two years later, the characters of Alison (Marnie Schulenburg) and Emily Stewart (Kelley Menighan Hensley) appeared, introducing Schulenburg in the role of Alison; The Bold and the Beautiful's Amber Moore (Adrienne Frantz), who began appearing on The Young and the Restless the year prior, was also involved in the storyline.

In July 2025, it was announced Bryton James would appear on Beyond the Gates as Devon Winters. He appeared during the August 11 episode.

== Themes ==
Sexuality played a major role in the stories. Formerly, soap operas did not delve into the sexual side of their romances. Bell changed that, first during his time as head writer of Days of Our Lives and again on The Young and the Restless. William Gray Espy's Snapper Foster is considered the "first to discover sex on a soap opera". During the story, the character is engaged to Chris Brooks (Trish Stewart) and having a sexual relationship with Sally McGuire (Lee Crawford). Other plots reflected sexual themes as well. For the first time in the genre, the dialogue and the story situations included explicit sexual themes such as premarital intercourse, impotence, and rape. The first two rape storylines that would be told on the serial were controversial at the time as they reflected a more introspective and analytic storytelling style, the first time rape storylines would be addressed in this manner in the genre. The first, in 1973–74, revolved around the rape of Chris Brooks and the aftermath, in which she entertained (and, eventually, rejected) the idea that she was perhaps at fault for her attack. The second, in 1976, involved Chris's sister Peggy (Pamela Peters Solow) and was meant to serve as a cut-and-dried story in which no viewer could justify this attack, committed out of the blue by an authority figure.

The series also explored social issues. Jennifer Brooks underwent the first mastectomy on a soap opera. Other social issue storylines included bulimia, alcoholism, and cancer. Lesbianism was also touched on with Katherine Chancellor, who flirts with Jill while drunk in 1974 and has a brief relationship with Joann Curtis (Kay Heberle) in 1977.

== Staff ==
The Young and the Restless executive producers
Name	Years	Production Notes/Contributions
William J. Bell	1973–2005	Also the show's creator and longtime head writer (until 1998), he served as the main executive producer while working alongside of other executive producers. He wasn't credited as an executive producer until 1982 when his credit began appearing with H. Wesley Kenney. Served as solo EP from 1986 to 1987 after the departure of Kenney. He received the title of "senior executive producer" when Edward Scott became EP and remained credited with the title until 2004 when he returned to the executive producer credit with John F. Smith as co-executive producer. William J. Bell died on April 29, 2005, and on the following Monday, his credit as EP was edited from the show; he was still living when those episodes were filmed.
John Conboy	1973–1982	Served as the show's first executive producer while credited with the "produced by" credit as the title of executive producer was credited hardly on any soaps (other than a small few), until the mid-1970s to 1980s. It was under his run when CBS wanted Y&R expanded from 30 minutes to an hour with the cancellation of Love of Life. Also the show switched from the live-to-tape filming technique to pre-recording episodes, a practice that remains in effect to this date as with all soaps. John departed in 1982 to produce his newly created soap Capitol, which was later cancelled to make room for Y&R's sister show The Bold and the Beautiful.
H. Wesley Kenney	1982–1986	Guided the show with more action-driven story direction inspired in large part by the more action oriented soap General Hospital which was a ratings smash at the time. The change to more action storylines are believed to be what helped the show win Daytime Emmy Award in 1983, 1985 and 1986. Began crediting the show's cast in alphabetical order, a standard that remains to this date. Ceased the fade to next scene transition effect within the show's episodes. Had artist Sandy Dvore, who designed the art drawing photos in the shows main title, to design the show's signature stylized brush stroke logo on Y&R merchandise in 1982, leading to the debut of the logo in the show's main title in January 1984.
Edward J. Scott	1987–2001	Debuted on the show in 1976 as an associate producer eventually becoming the "produced by" producer under John Conboy until 1987. Briefly filled in as EP for H. Wesley Kenney in 1986. Helped the show rise to co-#1 in 1987 with General Hospital in ratings before it solely dethroned GH as #1 in 1988 and has since remained there. Retired the longtime art drawings cast montage of the opening credits in 1988. Began the practice of crediting production principals on opening scenes of the show and adding the cast members' real-life names to the opening credits in 1999. Ceased the last commercial break between the last scene and end credits. Converted the show into HDTV in 2001, making it the first soap in history to do so. Returned from 2004 to 2007 as "supervising producer", a position he previously had briefly in 1987. Real-life husband of actress Melody Thomas Scott (Nikki Reed Newman). In 2024, he returned as a senior producer.
David Shaughnessy	2001–2004	Assumed executive producer position after serving as a producer and supervising producer since 1991. The Bell Dramatic Serial Co. production logo began appearing with end credits under his run. He managed to score brief returns by veteran actors such as Jaime Lyn Bauer, William Gray Espy, Meg Bennett and James Houghton (who wrote on the show between 1991 and 2006), all of whom who left the show back in the 1970s and 1980s, for brief storylines in 2002 and 2003. Debuted "next episode" preview scenes in 2003, a practice started with the ABC soaps in 1998.
John F. Smith	2003–2006	Became co-executive producer with William J. Bell and David Shaughnessy while still serving as co-head writer with Kay Alden and Trent Jones (until 2004). Worked as a writer on the show since the early 1980s. Still maintained the co-EP title after William J. Bell's passing in 2005. Stepped down in 2006 as EP while remaining as co-head writer until November 2006.
Lynn Marie Latham	2006–2007	Brought on as a "creative consultant" under John F. Smith in November 2005; Latham would later fire Smith as co-head writer in 2006. Promoted to head writer with Kay Alden and Smith in February 2006, then promoted to executive producer, becoming the show's first female EP in October 2006, after the show went that summer without an EP. Tenure as EP/HW was criticized by viewers and insiders for damaging the show's history with out-of-text writing, firing several longtime cast and crew members in favor of several unknowns, and doing too much favoritism. She was fired when she abandoned her post as EP to go on strike for the 2007–08 Writers Guide of America strike.
Josh Griffith	2006–2008	Brought on by Lynn Marie Latham as her co-executive producer in 2006. Assumed full producer duties in December 2007, when Latham was fired. He also served as head writer with Maria Arena Bell during the 2007–08 writers strike. Remained as EP when Bell became sole head writer until he was fired when it was learned that he was tampering with Bell's stories; this was also known as former EP Edward J. Scott, who is friends with Griffith, was said to be doing the same thing on Days of Our Lives, leading to his departure from that show.
Paul Rauch	2008–2011	The veteran producer debuted as Maria Arena Bell's co-executive producer in October 2008. It was established that his role as co-executive producer would be to only foresee everything with the production of the show while Bell was solely responsible for the stories. This was the only time Paul ever been a co-EP and his first stop back to soap operas in six years since his 2002 departure from Guiding Light. He opted not to renew his contract with Y&R after three years with the show and stepped down in May 2011.
Maria Arena Bell	2008–2012	Maria is married to William Bell, Jr., the oldest son of William J. Bell and Lee Phillip Bell. Under her run, she brought the show's fictional Jabot Cosmetics to life by teaming up with a real cosmetics marketing company to help distribute the products. Named head writer in December 2007. Bell was named executive producer in October 2008, after Josh Griffith was ousted for tampering with her stories. Bell brought along veteran producer Paul Rauch to help her with the production of the show while she mostly focused on the stories. She was known for steering away from character-driven storylines in favor of plot-driven ones, which was criticized. From 2008 to 2010, she was credited as co-executive producer as well as Rauch, while her credit appeared first. Bell was let go in July 2012; an official reason was never given for her departure, however many sources speculate it was due to the controversial pairing of characters Sharon Newman and Victor Newman (Sharon Case and Eric Braeden). One of the final milestones to happen under Bell's regime was the celebration of the 10,000th episode. The final episode under Bell's direction was broadcast on October 11, 2012; but she was credited until October 22.
Jill Farren Phelps	2012–2016	Named executive producer in July 2012 upon the dismissal of Maria Arena Bell. This marked the second CBS soap opera Phelps executive produced, with the first being Guiding Light from 1991 to 1995. While Maria Arena Bell was still credited, Phelps began her tenure by August as she made several immediate casting changes (such as hiring Robert Adamson and Hunter King, two young actors she worked with on the primetime soap Hollywood Heights, respectively). By October, she was still uncredited as executive producer although her first episode aired on October 12, 2012, and received her first official credit on October 23, 2012. On June 7, 2016, Serial Scoop and Daytime Confidential reported that Phelps had been terminated at that soap, with no confirmation of final airdate made at press time. Phelps' exit was confirmed the following day by Sony Pictures Television. Phelps was last credited as executive producer on July 12, 2016.
Charles Pratt Jr.	2015–2016	Named co-executive producer in September 2014, sharing the position with Phelps, a position he previously served on NBC soap opera Santa Barbara. Pratt's first episode as HW and co-EP aired on January 16, 2015. On September 13, 2016, it was announced that Pratt would no longer co-executive producer the soap, given his new position as show-runner of Lee Daniels' Star. Pratt was last credited as head writer and co-executive producer on December 6, 2016.
Mal Young	2016–2019	Named executive producer in June 2016 upon the dismissal of Jill Farren Phelps. This marks the first American soap opera Young executive produced, having previously been the producer and executive producer of British soap operas Brookside, EastEnders and Holby City. July 13, 2016, marked Young's first appearance as executive producer. Immediate changes made under Young included the return of actress Elizabeth Hendrickson and a return guest appearance from Michael Graziadei in the roles of Chloe Mitchell and Daniel Romalotti, respectively. The series celebrated its 11,000th episode under Young's credit on September 1, 2016. In 2017, it was announced that Young would take on head writer duties after Sally Sussman Morina's retirement. Young's first credit as head writer appeared on October 25, 2017. Young announced his decision to leave the series on December 18, 2018. Young received his last credit as executive producer on February 5, 2019, and on March 20, 2019, began co-writing alongside Griffith; Young's last credit as head writer aired on April 1, 2019.
Sally Sussman	2016–2017	Named co-executive producer in September 2016 upon the dismissal of Pratt, Jr.. Sussman shares the position with Young, a position she previously served on NBC soap opera Generations. Sussman's first credit as head writer and co-executive producer appeared on December 7, 2016. In July 2017, it was announced that Sussman would retire; she received her last credit as head writer and co-executive producer on October 24, 2017.
Anthony Morina	2019–2023	Named executive producer in December 2018 upon the exit of Mal Young. Morina was previously credited as a supervising producer from 2004 until 2019; he received his first credit as executive producer on February 6, 2019. The serial celebrated its 12,000th episode under Morina's credit on December 1, 2020. Morina's last episode as co-executive producer aired on February 6, 2023.
Josh Griffith	2019–2026	Named co-executive producer and head writer in December 2018 upon the exit of Mal Young. Griffith previously returned to the soap in 2018 as a supervising producer; he received his first credit as co-executive producer on February 6, 2019. Griffith first received co-head writing credit, alongside Young, beginning on March 20, 2019, and on April 2, was credited as sole head writer. The serial celebrated its 12,000th episode under Griffith's credit on December 1, 2020. He stepped down as executive producer in May 2026. His last credit as executive producer occurred on May 20 of the same year.
Sally McDonald	since 2025	Named co-executive producer in September 2025. She received her first credit as co-executive producer on October 28 of the same year. Following Griffith's decision to step down in May 2026, McDonald will remain as sole executive producer. Her first credit as sole executive producer occurred on May 21 of the same year.

The Young and the Restless head writers
Duration	Head writer(s)
1973–1997	William J. Bell
1997–1998	William J. Bell; Kay Alden
1998–2000	Kay Alden
2000–2002	Kay Alden; Trent Jones
2002–2004	Kay Alden; John F. Smith; Trent Jones
2004–2006	Kay Alden; John F. Smith
2006	Kay Alden; John F. Smith; Lynn Marie Latham
2006–2007	Lynn Marie Latham; Scott Hamner
2007–2008	Josh Griffith; Maria Arena Bell
2008–2012	Maria Arena Bell; Hogan Sheffer; Scott Hamner
2012–2013	Josh Griffith; Hogan Sheffer; Tracey Thomson; Shelly Altman
2013–2015	Shelly Altman; Jean Passanante; Tracey Thomson
2015–2016	Charles Pratt Jr.
2016–2017	Sally Sussman
2017–2019	Mal Young
2019	Mal Young; Josh Griffith
2019–2026	Josh Griffith
since 2026	Dan O'Connor; Jamey Giddens

== Awards ==
The serial has won 165 Daytime Emmys, among 360 nominations. The following list summarizes 82 Daytime Emmy awards won by The Young and the Restless:

=== Daytime Emmy Awards ===
The Young and the Restless' Daytime Emmy Award wins
Category	Recipient	Role	Year(s) awarded
Outstanding Drama Series			1975, 1983, 1985, 1986, 1993, 2004, 2007 (tied with Guiding Light), 2014, 2015 (tied with Days of Our Lives), 2019, 2020
Outstanding Individual Director in a Daytime Drama Series	Richard Dunlap		1975, 1978
Outstanding Drama Series Directing Team			1986, 1987, 1988, 1989, 1996, 1997, 1998, 1999, 2001, 2002, 2011, 2019, 2021
Outstanding Drama Series Writing Team			1992, 1997, 2000, 2006, 2011, 2014, 2017, 2019, 2021, 2023
Lead Actor	Peter Bergman; Eric Braeden; Christian LeBlanc; Doug Davidson; Billy Miller; Jason Thompson	Jack Abbott; Victor Newman; Michael Baldwin; Paul Williams; Billy Abbott; Billy Abbott	1991, 1992, 2002; 1998; 2005, 2007 2009; 2013; 2014; 2020
Lead Actress	Jess Walton; Michelle Stafford; Jeanne Cooper; Gina Tognoni; Eileen Davidson; Mishael Morgan; Michelle Stafford	Jill Foster Abbott; Phyllis Summers; Katherine Chancellor; Phyllis Summers; Ashley Abbott; Amanda Sinclair; Phyllis Summers	1997; 2004; 2008; 2017; 2018; 2022; 2024
Supporting Actor	Shemar Moore; Greg Rikaart; Kristoff St. John; Billy Miller; Steve Burton; Bryton James	Malcolm Winters; Kevin Fisher; Neil Winters; Billy Abbott; Dylan McAvoy; Devon Hamilton	2000; 2005; 2008; 2010, 2013 (tied with Scott Clifton); 2017; 2020
Supporting Actress	Beth Maitland; Jess Walton; Michelle Stafford; Sharon Case; Amelia Heinle; Jessica Collins; Camryn Grimes; Marla Adams; Courtney Hope; Susan Walters	Traci Abbott Connolly; Jill Foster Abbott; Phyllis Summers; Sharon Newman; Victoria Newman; Avery Bailey Clark; Mariah Copeland; Dina Mergeron; Sally Spectra; Diane Jenkins	1985; 1991; 1997; 1999; 2014, 2015; 2016; 2018; 2021; 2024; 2025
Younger Actress	Tracey E. Bregman; Tricia Cast; Heather Tom; Camryn Grimes; Christel Khalil; Hunter King	Lauren Fenmore; Nina Webster; Victoria Newman; Cassie Newman; Lily Winters; Summer Newman	1985; 1992; 1993, 1999; 2000; 2012; 2014, 2015
Younger Actor	Kristoff St. John; David Tom; David Lago; Bryton James	Neil Winters; Billy Abbott; Raul Guittierez; Devon Hamilton	1992; 2000; 2005; 2007
Lifetime Achievement Award	William J. Bell; Jeanne Cooper; Lee Phillip Bell; Melody Thomas Scott; Edward J. Scott	creator Katherine Chancellor co-creator Nikki Newman executive producer	1992; 2004; 2007; 2024; 2024

=== TV Soap Golden Boomerang Awards ===
- 2006 "Hall of Fame Inductee" Eric Braeden (Victor Newman)

=== Writers Guild of America Awards ===
- 2003 "Best Daytime Serial" Written by Kay Alden, Trent Jones, John F. Smith, Jerry Birn, Jim Houghton, Natalie Minardi, Janice Ferri, Eric Freiwald, Joshua McCaffrey, Michael Minnis, Rex M. Best
- 2006 "Best Daytime Serial" Written by Kay Alden, John F. Smith, Janice Ferri, Jim Houghton, Natalie Minardi Slater, Sally Sussman Morina, Sara Bibel, Eric Freiwald, Linda Schreiber, Joshua S. McCaffrey, Marc Hertz, Sandra Weintraub
- 2008 "Best Daytime Serial" Written by Lynn Marie Latham, Scott Hamner, Bernard Lechowick, Cherie Bennett, Jeff Gottesfeld, Jim Stanley, Natalie Minardi Slater, Lynsey Dufour, Marina Alburger, Sara Bibel, Sandra Weintraub

== International broadcast ==
=== Canada ===
In Canada, the Global Television Network airs new episodes a day ahead of the American broadcast. Most Global stations use The Young and the Restless as a late-afternoon lead-in for their local newscasts, but times vary by market. It also airs on NTV in Newfoundland and Labrador which airs the program on a same-day-as-CBS basis.

=== Caribbean ===
In Belize, Channel 5 Great Belize Television airs the soap, while rival Channel 7 Tropical Vision Limited also airs the soap.

In Jamaica, the show formerly aired on CVMTV.

In Trinidad and Tobago, the show airs weekdays on CBS and has been airing in Trinidad and Tobago since the 1980s. In 1988, 70 percent of Trinidadians and Tobagonians who had access to a television watched daily episodes of The Young and the Restless, a series that emphasized family problems, sexual intrigue, and gossip.

=== Oceania ===
In Australia, The Young and the Restless airs after Days of Our Lives on Arena. It previously aired on the Nine Network from April 1, 1974, to February 23, 2007, before joining the W lineup from April 2, 2007, to August 17, 2012. On July 20, 2012, it was announced that the show would move to Arena on August 20 that year after W rebranded as SoHo. Episodes are approximately one week behind those airing in the US at present.

In New Zealand, The Young and the Restless aired alongside Days of Our Lives on TVNZ 1 from August 25, 1975, to April 1988 where it moved to TVNZ 2, but it returned to TVNZ 1 from 2005 to November 6, 2009. The soap was approximately four seasons behind the CBS season due to being preempted by holiday and sporting programming.

In the Philippines, aired from 1987 to 1989 on ABS-CBN.

=== Europe ===
In the United Kingdom, The Young and The Restless has aired on many TV channels starting in 1990, when episodes from 1987 debuted on Galaxy in a regular weekday timeslot, 14:30-15:30 (and repeated in the early hours of the following morning). When BSB merged with Sky in November 1990 to form BskyB, the soap moved to Sky's flagship channel Sky One and aired at 11:00-12:00 weekdays until the end of 1992. When BskyB's original three-year contract to air the soap expired, Sky chose not to renew it. In 1993, Y&R was picked up by satellite channel, UK Living (then known as simply Living, now Sky Witness) in a primetime timeslot 20:00-21:00, picking up where Sky left off. This lasted until late 1995. In 2007, Zone Romantica, now CBS Drama, began broadcasting the show weekdays [four years behind US]. In 2009, when CBS went into partnership with and took over the Chellozone Channels the show was relegated to just one showing a day [in favor of repeating shows such as Dynasty and Dallas in the daytime]. It was attracting around 18–20,000 viewers at midnight in the last week of its broadcast in the UK in August 2010.

In Italy The Young and the Restless aired as Febbre d'amore from February 1983 to February 1984 on Italia 1, from October 1984 to June 1995 on Rete 4, in the summer of 1995 on Canale 5 and from April 1998 to October 2009 again on Rete 4. They were US episodes shown from autumn 1979 to March 1986, from November 1989 to December 1993 and from November 1998 to January 2007.

In France, The Young and the Restless has aired as Les Feux de l'Amour on free-to-air channel TF1 since August 1989. In Turkey, the show aired on the public broadcast network TRT under the name of Yalan Rüzgarı (meaning The Wind of Lies), utilising the abbreviation of the name of the original show.

== Music ==
"Nadia's Theme" has been the theme music of The Young and the Restless since the show's debut in 1973. The melody, originally titled "Cotton's Dream", was composed by Barry De Vorzon and Perry Botkin Jr. for the 1971 theatrical film Bless the Beasts and Children. The melody was later renamed "Nadia's Theme" after the American Broadcasting Company television network's sports summary program Wide World of Sports lent the music for a montage of Romanian gymnast Nadia Comăneci's routines during the 1976 Summer Olympics; despite the title, Nadia never performed her floor exercises using this piece of music. Instead, she used a piano arrangement of a medley of the songs "Yes Sir, That's My Baby" and "Jump in the Line".

Botkin wrote a rearranged version of the piece specifically for The Young and the Restless' debut. The song remained unchanged, save for a slight remix in 1988 and a three-year stint in the early 2000s, when an alternate, jazzier arrangement of that tune was used, using portions of the longer closing version of the original theme.

An LP album was published in 1976 by A&M Records. The track list contains two titles of the French composer Michel Colombier, Rainbow and Emmanuel, a success track which he wrote in memory of the death of his son.

In late September and early October 2012, upon the show's 10,000th episode, the current form of opening credits were updated. In the years prior, fans criticized them for their lack of updates and cast additions (some contract players, such as Adrienne Frantz, and Kimberlin Brown came and went without being added).

In mid-February 2017, the opening title sequence was updated in anticipation of the soaps's 44th anniversary. In March 2023, the opening title sequence was updated in celebration of the soap's 50th anniversary.

== Ratings ==
The Young and the Restless entered CBS' daytime lineup at 12 noon/11 a.m. Central in March 1973, a timeslot where two popular game shows, NBC's Jeopardy! (original version, hosted by Art Fleming) and ABC's Password (revival of the 1960s hit with Allen Ludden as host), vied for the top spot in the ratings. Quite a number of CBS affiliates in the Eastern Time Zone had for years been running local newscasts at noon, despite CBS giving them a 30-minute break one hour later, at 1 p.m., for that purpose.

With that scenario, at first, The Young and the Restless was at the bottom of the ratings, inheriting Where the Heart Is' low numbers and affiliate clearances. However, the youthful and sexually-driven storylines, which appealed perfectly to CBS' desired key demographic of younger women, helped it to rise rapidly, surging to ninth by 1974–75 and third by 1975–76. This eventually led to both Jeopardy!'s and Password's cancellations during 1975; a succession of shows (of varying formats) on both networks failed to make any significant impact for the next five years, other than perhaps ABC's The $20,000 Pyramid, which aired at noon/11 from 1978 to 1980. Apart from a dip to sixth in 1980-81 (its first full season at a full hour, when the first half went against ABC's then-top-rated Family Feud in the Central Time Zone or the second half against the first part of All My Children in the Eastern), it has been one of the five highest-rated soaps since the 1975–76 season. After Feud's decline beginning in 1984 (it would be canceled the next year) and the eventual plateauing of AMC and NBC's Days of Our Lives, the latter of which did undergo a brief resurgence in the mid-1980s, Y&R widened the ratings lead to the point where ABC and NBC never caught up again, both eventually ceding the Noon/11 time slot back to their local stations by the 1990s. By 1988–89 it had dethroned long-time leader General Hospital as the top-rated soap, a position it held until 2020. In 2010, it marked its 1,000th consecutive week in the top spot for daytime dramas. During the week of December 2, 2013, the series celebrated its 25th consecutive year as the number one daytime drama. The Young and the Restless airs every weeknight on Pop, where it averaged 362,000 viewers from July to September 2013.

On the week ending April 6, 2012, The Young and the Restless was watched by a new low of an average of 3,960,000 viewers for the week, beating its previous low of 4.209 million in October 2011, as well as being the only week to date below 4 million viewers. Currently, the show is still the most-watched daytime drama; and for the season 2011–12, has a household rating of 3.5, and 1.5 for the Women 18–49 demographic. As of 2008, the Tuesday episodes of The Young and the Restless on average is the most-watched daytime drama showing.

=== Ratings history ===
The Young and the Restless ratings history
Season	Rating	Season rank
1972–73^{A}	5.0	15th
1973–74	6.2	13th
1974–75	8.4	9th
1975–76	8.6	3rd
1976–77	8.7	4th
1977–78	7.8	5th
1978–79	8.6	3rd
1979–80	8.8	3rd
1980–81	7.8	6th
1981–82	7.4	5th
1982–83	8.0	4th
1983–84	8.8	3rd
1984–85	8.1	3rd
1985–86	8.3	2nd
1986–87	8.0	2nd
1987–88^{B}	8.1	1st
1988–89	8.1	1st^{C}
1990–91	8.1	1st
1991–92	8.2	1st
1992–93	8.4	1st
1993–94	8.6	1st
1994–95	7.5	1st
1995–96	7.6	1st
1996–97	7.1	1st
1997–98	6.8	1st
1998–99	6.9	1st
1999–00	6.8	1st
2000–01	5.8	1st
2001–02	5.0	1st
2002–03	4.7	1st
2003–04	4.4	1st
2004–05	4.2	1st
2005–06	4.2	1st
2006–07	4.2	1st
2007–08	4.1	1st
2008–09	3.7	1st
2009–10	3.8	1st
2010–11	3.6	1st
2011–12	3.5	1st
2012–13	3.6	1st
2013–14	3.4	1st
2014–15	3.5	1st
2015–16	3.6	1st
2016–17	3.5	1st
2017–18	4.3	1st
2018–19	4.0	1st
2019–20	3.5	1st
2020–21	3.2	1st
2021–22	3.4	1st
2022–23	3.3	1st

- ^A(debut)
- ^BTied in rating (8.1) with General Hospital; however General Hospital drew more viewers in millions.
- ^CThe Young and the Restless was number-one solo (for the first time) for the 1988–89 and retained this position until 2020.

== Media mentions ==
- The show was mentioned in the lyrics of Carlene Carter's "Every Little Thing" song in 1993.

== See also ==
- CBS Daytime
- List of The Young and the Restless cast members
- List of The Young and the Restless characters
- List of longest-serving soap opera actors
