= Generations (American TV series) =

American soap opera (1989–1991)

- Genre: Soap opera
- Created by: Sally Sussman Morina
- Starring: Various
- Theme music composer: Michael Gore
- Country of origin: United States
- Original language: English
- No. of episodes: 470

Production
- Running time: 22–24 minutes
- Production companies: Old Forest Hill Productions; NBC Studios

Original release
- Network: NBC
- Release: March 27, 1989 – January 25, 1991

Generations is an American soap opera that aired on NBC in the United States from March 27, 1989, to January 25, 1991, and in Canada, where it ran on CBC Television. Set in Chicago and its suburbs, Generations centers on three generations of two families, one black and one white. The show was groundbreaking in that it was the first soap opera to feature a Black-American family from its inception. During its run, the series received seven Daytime Emmy Awards nominations.

== Overview ==
Generations was promoted as television's first fully integrated daytime soap. It focused on the relationship between two Chicago families: the Whitmores and the Marshalls. Their association began several decades ago when Vivian Potter (Lynn Hamilton) was housekeeper and nanny for Rebecca Whitmore and her three children: Laura (Gail Ramsey), Stephanie (nicknamed Sam) (Kelly Rutherford), and J.D. Vivian's young daughter, Ruth (Joan Pringle) lived with her in the Whitmore mansion.

The series faced difficult time slot and competition opposite The Young and the Restless and was canceled due to low ratings and high production costs on November 22, 1990. The final episode aired on January 25, 1991.

== Cast ==
- Marla Adams (Helen Mullin)
- Anthony Addabbo (Jason Craig)
- Jonelle Allen (Doreen Jackson)
- Jack Betts (Hugh Gardner)
- Taurean Blacque/James Reynolds (Henry Marshall)
- Sharon Brown/Debbi Morgan (Chantal Marshall)
- Patricia Crowley/Dorothy Lyman (Rebecca Whitmore)
- George Deloy (Rob Donnelly)
- Elinor Donahue (Sylvia Furth)
- Rick Fitts (Martin Jackson)
- Vivica A. Fox (Maya Reubens)
- Bruce Gray (Phillip Webb)
- Lynn Hamilton (Vivian Potter)
- Ron Harper (Peter Whitmore)
- Andrew Masset (Trevor McCallum)
- Joan Pringle (Ruth Marshall)
- Gail Ramsey (Laura McCallum)
- Barbara Rhoades/Linda Gibboney (Jessica Gardner)
- Richard Roundtree (Dr. Daniel Ruebens)
- Kelly Rutherford (Stephanie "Sam" Whitmore)
- George Shannon /Robert Gentry (Jordan Hale)
- Nancy Sorel (Monique McCallum)
- Kristoff St. John (Adam Marshall)
- Robert Torti (Lt. Kyle Masters)
- Joseph Whipp (Charles Mullin)
- Allen Williams (John Spector)

== Ratings ==
- 1988–89 season: 2.7 rating (Ranking: #12 out of 13 soap operas)
- 1989–90 season: 2.6 rating (Ranking: #12 out of 12 soap operas)
- 1990–91 season: 2.4 rating (Ranking: #12 out of 12 soap operas)
  - Final week ratings (January 21–25, 1991): 2.7 rating/8 share (12th out of 12), against Loving (3.2 rating/10 share, 11th) and The Young and the Restless (8.4 rating/26 share, 1st)

== Awards ==
- 1990 Soap Opera Digest Awards for Outstanding Daytime Serial Nomination
- 1990 Creative Arts Emmy Award for Outstanding Graphics and Title Design Win
- 1990 Daytime Emmy Award for Outstanding Supporting Actor in a Drama Series (Kristoff St. John) Nomination
- 1990 Creative Arts Emmy Award for Outstanding Achievement in Art Direction/Set Decoration/Scenic Design for a Drama Series Nomination
- 1990 Creative Arts Emmy Award for Outstanding Achievement in Hairstyling for a Drama Series Nomination
- 1990 Creative Arts Emmy Award for Outstanding Achievement in Technical Direction/Electronic Camera/Video Control for a Drama Series Nomination
- 1990 Soap Opera Digest Award for Outstanding Daytime Serial Nomination
- 1991 Daytime Emmy Award for Outstanding Lead Actor in a Drama Series (James Reynolds) Nomination
- 1991 Daytime Emmy Award for Outstanding Younger Actor in a Drama Series (Kristoff St. John) Nomination
- 1991 Soap Opera Digest Award for Outstanding Daytime Soap Nomination
- 1991 Soap Opera Digest Award for Outstanding Heroine: Daytime (Kelly Rutherford) Nomination
- 1991 Soap Opera Digest Award for Outstanding Male Newcomer: Daytime (Robert Torti) Nomination
- 1991 Soap Opera Digest Award for Outstanding Supporting Actor: Daytime (Richard Roundtree) Nomination
- 1991 Soap Opera Digest Award for Outstanding Supporting Actress: Daytime (Joan Pringle) Nomination
- 1992 Soap Opera Digest Award for Best Love Story: Daytime or Prime Time Kyle and Sam Nomination
- 1992 Soap Opera Digest Award for Outstanding Daytime Serial Nomination
- 1992 Soap Opera Digest Award for Outstanding Villain: Daytime (Robert Gentry) Nomination
