= Sally Sussman Morina =

American screenwriter and producer

Sally Sussman Morina is an American documentary filmmaker, television writer, and producer.

== Personal life ==
She is married to Anthony Morina, a CBS Daytime director and producer. She has gone by her married name Sally Sussman Morina on various projects. She is based in Santa Monica, California.

== Career ==
In May 2016, the feature documentary, Midnight Return: The Story of Billy Hayes and Turkey which was Directed, Written and Produced by Sally Sussman had its World Premiere at the Cannes Film Festival. The film has shown in festivals all over the world and is currently in its theatrical release and available on Sundance Now. https://pro-labs.imdb.com/title/tt3511510/?ref_=sch_int

On September 15, 2016, it was confirmed that Sussman was named as The Young and the Restless's new head writer and Co-Executive Producer. Sussman's tenure as head writer began taping on October 20, 2016, and is aired on December 7, 2016. On July 31, 2017, Daytime Confidential announced that both Kay Alden and Sussman will be departing from the show, with Mal Young being named as the new head writer.

== Positions held ==
Midnight Return: The Story of Billy Hayes and Turkey

- Director/Writer/Producer

The Young and the Restless

- Head Writer: December 7, 2016 – October 24, 2017
- Co-Executive Producer: December 7, 2016 – October 24, 2017
- Associate Head Writer: June 10, 2005 - November 2006
- Breakdown Writer: June 10, 2005 - November 2006
- Writer: 1984 - 1988
- Storyline Consultant: January 3, 1983 – 1987 (hired by William J. Bell), May 17, 2005 - May 12, 2006 (hired by John F. Smith)

The Facts of Life

- Writer

Knots Landing

- Writer

Freshman Dorm

- Writer

Another World

- Script Writer: 1996

Days of Our Lives

- Head Writer: January 8, 1998 - October 15, 1999
- Co-Head Writer: November 21, 1997 - January 5, 1998
- Associate Head Writer: 1996-1997 (hired by James E. Reilly)

Generations

- Creator
- Head Writer: March 27, 1989 - January 25, 1991
- Executive Producer: March 27, 1989 - January 25, 1991

Spyder Games

- Executive Producer: 2001
- Head Writer: 2001

== Awards and nominations ==
Cannes Film Festival

Nominated, Golden Camera

Midnight Return: The Story of Billy Hayes and Turkey

Nominated, Golden Eye

Midnight Return: The Story of Billy Hayes and Turkey

Daytime Emmy Awards

- NOMINATIONS (1998, 1999; Best Writing; Days Of Our Lives) & (1986, 1987 & 2006 Best Writing; The Young And The Restless)
- WIN (2006; Best Writing; The Young And The Restless)

Writers Guild of America Award

- NOMINATIONS: (2005 & 2006 season; The Young And The Restless); (1999 season; Days Of Our Lives)
- WINS: (2005 season; The Young And The Restless); (1999 season; Days Of Our Lives)

== Head writing tenures ==
Preceded by none	Head Writer of Generations (with Thom Racina); March 27, 1989 – January 25, 1991	Succeeded by Show canceled
Preceded by James E. Reilly	Head Writer of Days of Our Lives (with James E. Reilly: November 21, 1997 – January 5, 1998); November 21, 1997 – October 14, 1999	Succeeded by Lorraine Broderick
Preceded by Charles Pratt Jr.	Head writer of The Young and the Restless; December 7, 2016 – October 24, 2017	Succeeded by Mal Young

== Executive Producing Tenure ==
Preceded by none	Executive Producer of Generations; March 27, 1989 – January 25, 1991	Succeeded by Show canceled
Preceded by Charles Pratt Jr. Mal Young	Executive Producer of The Young and the Restless (with Mal Young); December 7, 2016 – October 24, 2017	Succeeded by Mal Young
