= David Shaughnessy =

British actor

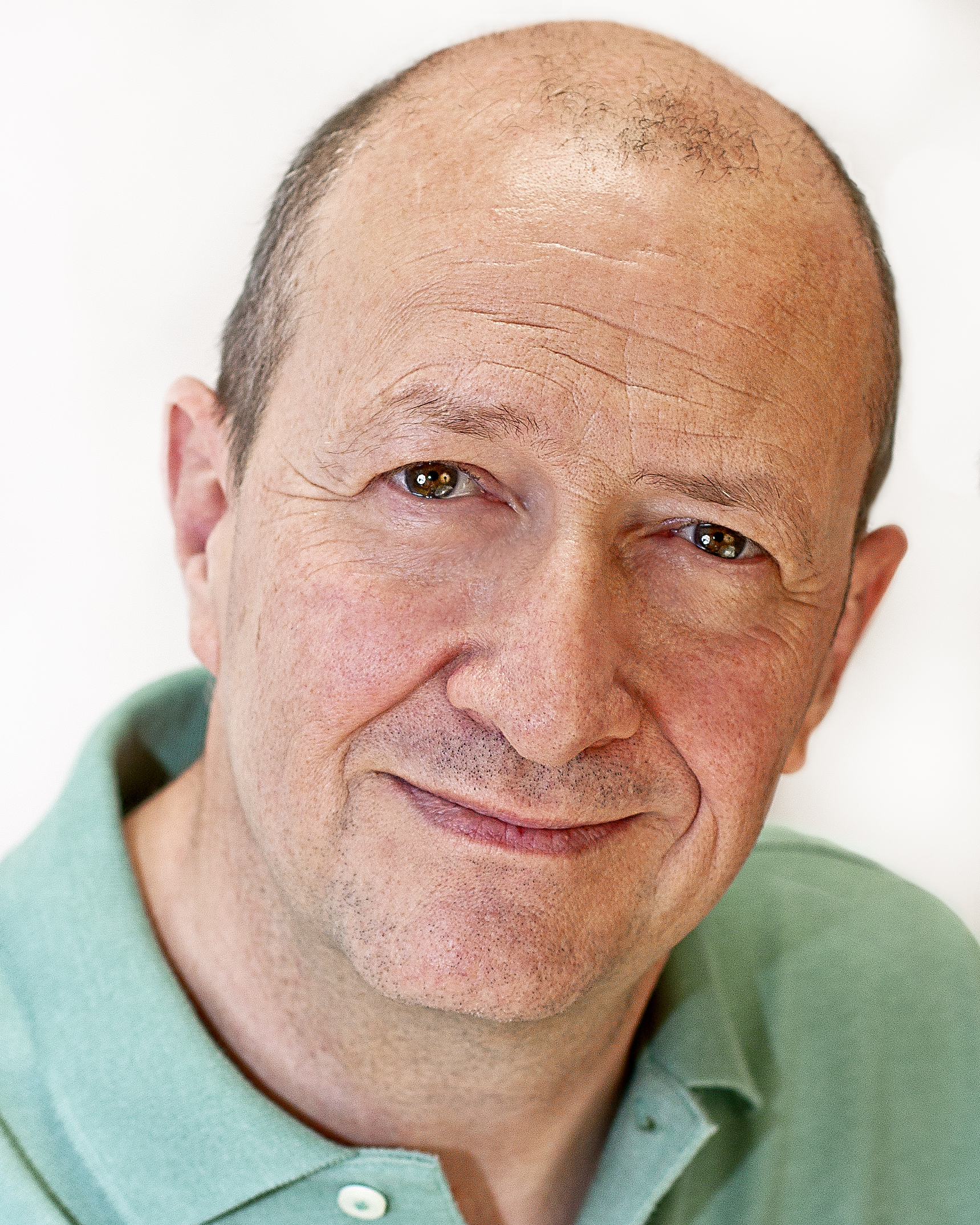
- David Shaughnessy in 2014
- Occupations: Actor; producer; director
- Years active: 1979–present
- Spouse: Anne Schoettle
- Children: 3
- Parents: Alfred Shaughnessy (father); Jean Lodge (mother)
- Relatives: Charles Shaughnessy (brother)
- Website: davidshaughnessy.net

David Shaughnessy is an English actor, producer and director known for his voice-work in Big Hero 6, Big Hero 6: The Series, Fallout 4, Labyrinth, Mass Effect, Peter Pan and the Pirates, Star Wars Rebels, The Darkness II, The Elder Scrolls and Warcraft. He has directed for shows such as Days of Our Lives, The Bold and the Beautiful and The Young and The Restless. He is the brother of actor Charles Shaughnessy and heir to the Barony of Shaughnessy.

== Career ==
As an actor, Shaughnessy started in repertory theatres in the UK and went on to become a principal actor with The Old Vic in London and touring around the world. He went on to perform in national tours, including 18 months in Godspell for producer Cameron Mackintosh and has acted in a number of American and British films and television series.

Shaughnessy later turned to television and theatre directing. He directed the world premiere of Steve Brown's critically acclaimed musical, Elmer Gantry at the Chichester Festival Theatre. In 1985, he made his voice-over debut in Jim Henson's cult classic Labyrinth. He voiced Sir Didymus, the Hat and various goblin characters. After appearing in several American films and television series, he became an executive producer of the daytime drama The Young and the Restless and has directed episodes of Santa Barbara (1987), The Young and the Restless, The Bold and the Beautiful, Days of Our Lives and many other shows. Shaughnessy has also provided voice work for animation, commercials, films and video games.

His father was Alfred Shaughnessy, a scriptwriter best known for his work as head writer and producer of Upstairs, Downstairs. His older brother, Charles Shaughnessy, is also an actor best known as Maxwell Sheffield on The Nanny and Shane Donovan in Days of Our Lives, and currently holder of the title of Baron Shaughnessy; David is his brother's heir presumptive. His wife is former Days of Our Lives head writer Anne Schoettle. The two live in Los Angeles and have three daughters; Amy, Katie and Josie.

== Director ==
- Santa Barbara (1987)
- Trial by Jury (1987)
- The Bold and the Beautiful (1988–2016)
- Tribes (1990)
- The Young and the Restless (1990–2004)
- Days of Our Lives (2019–present)

== Filmography ==
=== Live-action ===
==== Film ====
Year	Title	Role	Notes
1986	The Whistle Blower	Medical Officer	
1989	Death Spa	Freddie	

==== Television ====
Year	Title	Role	Notes
1979	Danger UXB	Lieutenant Carter Brown	5 episodes
1982	The Haunting of Cassie Palmer	Phillip Craven	1 episode
1982	Q.E.D.	Official	Episode: "The Great Motor Race"
1984	The Brief	Adjutant	Episode: "Nickels and Dimes"
1985	Three Up Two Down	Man with Wardrobe	Episode: "Widower's Mite"
1985	Minder	Doctor	Episode: "The Return of the Invincible Man"
1986	The Clairvoyant	Motorist	1 episode
1988	War and Remembrance	RAF Officer (Singapore)	Episode: "Part 1"
1989	Newhart	Charles	Episode: "Home and Jojo"
2012	Guys with Kids	Ian	Episode: "Thanksgiving"

=== Voice acting ===
==== Film ====
Year	Title	Role	Notes
1986	Labyrinth	Sir Didymus, The Hat, Guard #3	
2012	Adventures in Zambezia	Morton	
2014	Big Hero 6	Heathcliff	
2015	Top Cat Begins	Maitre D, Suspicious Guy	
2019	Birds of a Feather	Percival	

==== Television ====
Year	Title	Role	Notes
1990–91	Peter Pan and the Pirates	Gentleman Starkey	17 episodes
2007	Random! Cartoons	Blimey	Episode: "Super John Doe Junior"
2013–2014	Robot Chicken	Hans Gruber, Zordon, Dallas, Farmer Smurf	2 episodes
2014–2017	Star Wars Rebels	Commandant Aresko, Taskmaster Grint	7 episodes
2016–2017	Avengers Assemble	Ulysses Klaue, Secret Service Member	3 episodes
2017, 2019	The Tom and Jerry Show	Cates, Duke	2 episodes
2017–2020	Big Hero 6: The Series	Heathcliff, additional voices	10 episodes
2018–2020	Star Wars Resistance	Drell, Narvin, Stormtrooper	6 episodes
2020	Cleopatra in Space	Msamaki, Chostipher, Nuvillo	2 episodes
2020–2025	Blood of Zeus	Chiron, Dionysus, Hephaestus	7 episodes
2021–2022	Dota: Dragon's Blood	Oracle, Barkeep, Elder, Toothless Citizen	4 episodes
2021	Young Justice	Jason Blood / Etrigan the Demon	Episode: "Nomed Esir!"
2022	Tales of the Jedi	Old Man	Episode: "Resolve"
2024	Star Wars: Young Jedi Adventures	Mayor Brooks	Episode: "The Rustler Roundup"
2024	The Loud House	Muscled Spy, Fancy Male Guest	Episode: "Europe Road Trip: A Knight to Remember"
2024	Barbie Mysteries: The Great Horse Chase	Denholm, Milton	

==== Video games ====
Year	Title	Role	Notes
2006	Destroy All Humans! 2	Additional Voices	
2006	Resistance: Fall of Man	Additional Voices	
2006	Flushed Away	Additional Voices	
2007	Mass Effect	Vigil, Colonist	
2009	The Lord of the Rings: Conquest	Orc Officer #2	
2010	Alice in Wonderland	Absolem the Caterpillar	
2010	Prince of Persia: The Forgotten Sands	Ahihud	
2010	Final Fantasy XIV	Additional Voices	English version
2011	The Elder Scrolls V: Skyrim	Knight Paladin Gelebor	Dawnguard DLC
2012	The Darkness II	Jimmy Wilson	
2012	Kingdoms of Amalur: Reckoning	Additional Voices	
2012	World of Warcraft: Mists of Pandaria	Master Shang Xi	
2013	The Bureau: XCOM Declassified	Quartermaster Webb, Additional Voices	
2013	Grand Theft Auto V	The Local Population	
2014	Hearthstone	Khadgar	
2014	Smite	Jade Rabbit Chang'e	
2014	The Elder Scrolls Online	Hermaeus Mora, Altmer Male, Dunmer Male, Daedric Male, Additional Voices	Also Morrowind
2014	World of Warcraft: Warlords of Draenor	Velen	
2014	Lichdom: Battlemage	Cavassa, Zealot	
2015	The Order: 1886	Lord Hastings	
2015	Fallout 4	General Gage, Mayor	
2015	Rise of the Tomb Raider	Additional Voices	
2016	World of Warcraft: Legion	Various	
2018	World of Warcraft: Battle for Azeroth	Majo	
2018	Call of Duty: Black Ops 4	Disciple	
2019	Crackdown 3	Kuli Ngata	
2019	World War Z	Wolfe	
2019	Marvel Ultimate Alliance 3: The Black Order	Ulysses Klaue / Klaw	
2019	Asgard's Wrath	Valdorf	
2020	World of Warcraft: Shadowlands	Mikanikos	
2021	Rhythm of the Universe: Ionia	Babaton	
2022	Destiny 2: The Witch Queen	Immaru	
2023	Destiny 2: Lightfall	Immaru	
2023	Diablo IV	Tree Whispers	
2024	Indiana Jones and the Great Circle	Marcus Brody	
2025	Dune Awakening	Arsen Demo	

== Awards and nominations ==
Daytime Emmy Award

- Win, 1993, 2004, Drama series, The Young and the Restless and 2013, 2015 Directing Team, The Bold & the Beautiful
- Nomination, 1999–2003, Drama series, The Young and the Restless, 2013 Directing team, The Bold & the Beautiful

== Executive producing tenure ==
Preceded by William J. Bell; Edward J. Scott	Executive Producer of The Young and the Restless (with William J. Bell) (with John F. Smith: June 25, 2003 – January 9, 2004); January 14, 2002 – January 9, 2004	Succeeded by William J. Bell; John F. Smith
