= The New Man (Upstairs, Downstairs) =

- Upstairs, Downstairs episode
- Episode no.: Season 2 Episode 1
- Directed by: Raymond Menmuir
- Written by: Rosemary Anne Sisson
- Original air date: 21 October 1972

Episode chronology
← Previous "For Love of Love"	Next → "A Pair of Exiles"

"The New Man" is the first episode of the second series of the British television series, Upstairs, Downstairs. The episode is set in the summer of 1908.

== Plot ==
Without consulting her daughter, Lady Marjorie has engaged a house cook for Elizabeth and her new husband, the effete show-off and moderately famous (but not financially successful) poet Lawrence. On a flight of fancy, Lawrence insists on engaging a valet, rather than the more economical alternative of a mere boot-boy. Despite not being consulted, and not being given a chance to manage the household budget, Elizabeth has to bear the cost out of her moderate dowry.

Thomas Watkins applies for the job as valet and is engaged to start after a superficial interview by Lawrence, whom he quickly assesses as a complete pushover. Meanwhile, Lawrence increasingly excludes Elizabeth from his daily activities, obviously little interested in his wife's company.

In the new Kirbridge residence, Thomas makes advances towards Rose, who is flattered, and she almost succumbs, but Elizabeth discovers the two flirting. After yelling at the two servants, she retreats to her room and then bursts into tears, clinging to Rose for comfort.

== Cast ==
Guest cast

- Colin Cunningham (Milkman)
- Bill Burridge (Muffin Man)
- Lilian Padmore (Nanny)
- Joanna Robbins (Maid)
- Andrew Pitcher
- Lori Portugal (Children)
