= Bryan Coleman =

British actor (1911–2005)

- Coleman in Crooks Anonymous (1962)
- Born: Bryan Ernest D. B. Coleman; 29 January 1911; London, United Kingdom
- Died: 4 July 2005 (aged 94); Dorset, United Kingdom
- Occupation(s): Television and film actor
- Years active: 1936–1994

Bryan Coleman (29 January 1911 – 4 July 2005) was a British film actor and television actor.

In 1954 he appeared in William Douglas Home's comedy The Manor of Northstead in the West End.

== Selected filmography ==
- Conquest of the Air (1936) – Minor Role (uncredited)
- Sword of Honour (1939) – Unlisted (uncredited)
- A Window in London (1940) – Constable
- Jassy (1947) – Sedley – the Architect
- Train of Events (1949) – Actor (segment "The Actor")
- Landfall (1949) – PO Weaver (uncredited)
- The Lost Hours (1952) – Tom Wrigley
- The Planter's Wife (1952) – Capt. Dell (uncredited)
- When Knighthood Was in Flower (1953) – Earl of Surrey
- You Know What Sailors Are (1954) – Lt. Comdr. Voles
- Loser Takes All (1956) – Elegant Man at Casino (uncredited)
- Suspended Alibi (1957) – Bill Forrest
- The Tommy Steele Story (1957) – Hospital Doctor
- The Truth About Women (1957)
- Blood of the Vampire (1958) – Monsieur Auron
- Life in Danger (1959) – Chief Constable Ryman
- The Hand (1960) – Adams
- Crooks Anonymous (1962) – Holding
- The Longest Day (1962) – Ronald Callen (uncredited)
- Life in Danger (1964) – Chief Constable Ryman
- Mr. Brown Comes Down the Hill (1965) – Bishop
- Give a Dog a Bone (1965) – Lord Swill
- Happy Deathday (1968) – Dr. Oliver Tarquin
- Zeppelin (1971) – Colonel Whippen
- Mona Lisa (1986) – Gentleman in Mirror Room
- Johann Strauss: The King Without a Crown (1987)
- The Crying Game (1992) – Judge
- Chaplin (1992) – Drunk

== Television roles ==
William Tell, 'Boy Slaves', 1958, as the Count Heinemann

- Happily Ever After (1961–1964) – Harry Watkins
- Adam Adamant Lives! (1966) – Major Fitzgibbon
- Upstairs, Downstairs (1972) – Sir William Manning
- The Duchess of Duke Street (1976–1977) – Lord Henry Norton
- Hazell (1978) – Charles Courtney
- The Incredible Mr Tanner (1981)– Commissionaire
