= Trent Jones =

American soap opera writer

Trent Jones is an American soap opera writer, singer, and actor.

== Life and career ==
Jones is a graduate of Choate Rosemary Hall school in Wallingford, Connecticut.

He began playing rock star Ken George Jones on the ABC soap opera Ryan's Hope. As well as acting in the role, Jones sang and composed some of his character's songs. He later was hired to become a script writer for the show, from 1982-83.

He worked as a writer on the CBS soap operas Guiding Light (1983–89; 1991–93), Search for Tomorrow (1986), As the World Turns (2005), and The Young and the Restless (1993-2006). He was also head writer of Tribes in 1990 and co-head writer of The Young and The Restless from 2000–04. Most recently he created the web series Feed Me, produced by Gordon Elliott.

== Personal life ==
He lives in Madison, Connecticut with his wife Francesca Jones, a freelance artist. He has four daughters, one son, and 8 grandchildren.

== Awards and nominations ==
Daytime Emmy Awards

WINS

- (1983; Best Writing; Ryan's Hope)
- (1986, 1990 & 1993; Best Writing; Guiding Light)
- (1997 & 2000; Best Writing; The Young and the Restless)

NOMINATIONS

- (1985, 1989 & 1992; Best Writing; Guiding Light)
- (1994, 1995, 1998, 1999, 2001, 2003, 2004, 2005 & 2007; Best Writing; The Young and the Restless)
- (2006; Best Writing; As the World Turns)

Writers Guild of America Award

WINS

- (2003 season; The Young and the Restless)

NOMINATIONS

- (1985, 1986 & 1989 seasons; Guiding Light)
- (2000, 2002 & 2007 seasons; The Young and the Restless)
- (2006 season; As the World Turns)
