= Alfred Shaughnessy =

English scriptwriter, film director and producer (1916–2005)

- Born: 19 May 1916; London, England
- Died: 2 November 2005 (aged 89); Plymouth, Devon, England
- Occupations: Television producer, scriptwriter, film director
- Spouse: Jean Lodge (m. 1948)
- Children: Charles Shaughnessy; David Shaughnessy

Alfred James Shaughnessy (19 May 1916 – 2 November 2005) was an English scriptwriter, film director and producer best known for being the script editor of Upstairs, Downstairs.

== Early life ==
Alfred Shaughnessy was born in London, his father, the Hon Alfred Thomas Shaughnessy, having died while serving with the Canadian army in France two months before. His grandfather Thomas Shaughnessy was an American-born Canadian railway administrator of Irish descent, who was created Baron Shaughnessy in 1916, and his mother was a second cousin of James K. Polk, the 11th US President. He spent his early years living in Tennessee, and in 1920 his mother, Sarah Polk Bradford, married The Hon Sir Piers Legh who then became Equerry to the Prince of Wales, and the family moved to Norfolk Square in London. The family had a butler, cook, footman, two housemaids, a kitchen maid and a lady's maid. The Prince of Wales later visited the house for dinner, and he drew on this when writing the Upstairs, Downstairs episode Guest of Honour. He also often spent weekends and holidays at Lyme Park, his stepfather's ancestral home. Sir Piers Legh later became Master of the Household.

Shaughnessy was educated at Summer Fields then Eton, and then went to the Royal Military College, Sandhurst, with the intention of joining the Grenadier Guards. However, in 1935 he resigned on grounds of conscience, once stating he didn't wish to have a career dedicated "to learning to kill men". He then had an unsuccessful time at the London Stock Exchange, and had a hectic social life, with debutante balls, shooting parties and country weekends.

== Career ==
In the late 1930s Shaughnessy began to write lyrics and sketches, but at the outbreak of war in 1939 he returned to the Army, and on D-Day landed with the Guards Armoured Division on Gold Beach.

After the war ended, he got a job at Ealing Studios, and he soon began his career as a successful writer, producer and director. In 1956, he directed the film Suspended Alibi and continued to direct and produce during the 1950s and 1960s. In the 1970s, he began to concentrate on script writing. His first major success was Upstairs, Downstairs. He wrote fifteen episodes and was the script editor for 66 episodes, and was meticulous in researching facts about the era.

He later wrote episodes for The Adventures of Sherlock Holmes, The Cedar Tree, The Irish R.M., All Creatures Great and Small, The Saint, Journey to the Unknown and Alleyn Mysteries. Shaughnessy wrote two novels, Dearest Enemy and Hugo.

== Personal life ==
Shaughnessy married the actress Jean Lodge in 1948, and they had two sons, Charles, who is an actor best known for his roles as Shane Donovan on the American television soap opera Days of Our Lives and as Maxwell Sheffield on the American television series The Nanny, and David, an actor and producer. He wrote his autobiography, Both Ends of the Candle, in 1975, and followed this with A Confession in Writing in 1997. He also wrote his mother's memoirs. He died in 2005 aged 89, in Plymouth, Devon, shortly after having recorded an interview with Simon Williams about Upstairs, Downstairs.

Pete Walker, director of two films written by Shaughnessy, described him as "an Eton-educated pillar of the establishment - the Queen's first boyfriend, actually", but there is no evidence to support this.

== Select film credits ==
- Just My Luck (1957) - script writer

== Notes ==
- Shaughnessy, Alfred (1997). A confession in writing. Tabb House.
- The Daily Telegraph Obituary
- The Times Obituary
- The Guardian Obituary
