= The Young and the Restless storylines =

American soap opera storylines

The storylines of the soap opera The Young and the Restless have changed over the years since the show debuted in 1973. Originally examining the lives of the wealthy Brooks and the poor Fosters, a series of recasts and departures in the early 1980s turned the focus of The Young and the Restless to the Abbotts and the Newmans, including the corporate rivalry between their two respective companies. However, one basic plot that has run throughout almost all of the program's history is the rivalry between Jill Foster Abbott and Katherine Chancellor, similar to the show's sister show, The Bold and the Beautiful, regarding Brooke Logan and Stephanie Forrester.

== The Brooks and the Fosters ==
The Young and the Restless co-creator William J. Bell conceived the show to center around the class conflict between two core families: the wealthy Brooks and the poor Fosters. Newspaper publisher Stuart Brooks (played by Robert Colbert) and his socialite wife Jennifer (Dorothy Green) had four daughters: Leslie (Janice Lynde), a pianist; Lauralee "Lorie" (Jaime Lyn Bauer), an author; Christabel "Chris" (Trish Stewart), a journalist; and Peggy (Pamela Peters Solow), a college student. Meanwhile, Elizabeth "Liz" Foster (Julianna McCarthy) was a factory worker and single parent who, after being abandoned by her husband William "Bill" Sr. (Charles H. Gray), was struggling to make ends meet while trying to raise three children: William "Snapper" Jr. (played at first by William Grey Espy, then by David Hasselhoff), a medical student; Greg (James Houghton), a law student; and Jill (Brenda Dickson; later Bond Gideon, Deborah Adair, and currently Jess Walton), a beautician and aspiring model.

In the show's first story there was a love triangle formed between Chris, Snapper, and waitress Sally McGuire (Lee Crawford). Chris and Snapper were a couple, but Chris wanted to not have sex until marriage. Snapper had a sexual relationship with Sally. Desperate to gain an upper hand, Sally threw away her birth control pills and got pregnant by Snapper. Not knowing that he was the father, Snapper proposed to Chris. When they found out he was the father of Sally's child, Chris suffered a miscarriage. Eventually, Sally moved out of town, and Chris and Snapper reconciled.

Sisters, Leslie and Lorie fought over first Brad Eliot (Tom Hallick) and then in another love triangle with Lance Prentiss (John McCook). This love triangle stretched into four after Lance's sea captain brother Lucas (Tom Ligon) arrived in town. Although Lorie was little more than the bad girl who tormented pure sister Leslie, she became a lead in her own right as she battled her sister over custody of Leslie's son Brooks (Andre Gower), and then battled her psychotic mother-in-law Vanessa (K.T. Stevens) (who even killed herself just to frame Lorie for the crime).

Other stories included Bill, dying of cancer, returning to town and remarrying Liz; Jennifer planning to divorce Stuart and marry her former lover and Liz Foster's brother Dr. Bruce Henderson (Paul Stevens), who was revealed to be Lorie's biological father; and Stuart and Liz marrying after Jennifer died of cancer.

== Jill vs. Kay ==
The show's longest-running storyline was the rivalry between a young manicurist Jill Foster Abbott (Brenda Dickson, Jess Walton) and wealthy socialite, Katherine Chancellor (Jeanne Cooper). Cooper was introduced by Bell when the ratings were low; the storyline between Jill and Kay became popular, so Bell decided to exploit this popularity by crafting a storyline putting the two at odds.

Jill went to work as Kay's manicurist and assistant to help her struggling family pay the bills. Kay was a boozy matron trapped in a loveless marriage to Phillip Chancellor II (John Considine later Donnelly Rhodes). Jill and Phillip fell in love, but in 1976, after he returned from obtaining a divorce in the Dominican Republic, Katherine picked him up at the airport and, in an attempt to kill both Phillip and herself, drove the car off a cliff. On his deathbed, Phillip married Jill and bequeathed her and their love child his fortune. At first, Kay offered Jill $1 million for the baby, but ended up getting a judge to declare that Jill and Phillip's marriage was illegal since Kay was drunk when signing her divorce papers. Since neither Jill nor her son had any rights to an inheritance, the baby was legally given the name "Phillip Foster" instead of "Phillip Chancellor III". As a result of the ruling, an embittered Jill became a vixen and the two ladies began an intense rivalry, blaming each other for the death of Phillip II.

First, they fought over beautician Derek Thurston (Joe LaDue) in the late 1970s. In 1982, Jill married tycoon John Abbott (Jerry Douglas), but within a few years, Kay seized the opportunity to break them up after obtaining photos of Jill's one-night-affair with John's son Jack (Terry Lester; currently Peter Bergman); John suffered a stroke after seeing those images and divorced Jill. The two ladies also fought for custody of Phillip Foster (Thom Bierdz) in the late 1980s, with Kay being awarded temporary custody without the right to adopt. Eventually, Kay arranged for his name to be legally changed to Phillip Chancellor III.

In the 1990s, after Phillip III died from a car crash, and after Jill's second marriage to John ended, the two ladies went back to court when some of Phillip II's documents were found in the Chancellor mansion attic; the judge declared that Jill owned half of the Chancellor estate. Jill and Kay fought over this new arrangement as well as Jill's son Billy (David Tom/Ryan Brown/Scott Seymour/Billy Miller) dating Kay's granddaughter Mackenzie "Mac" Browning (Ashley Bashioum/Kelly Kruger/Rachel Kimsey/Clementine Ford).

In 2003, the Jill-Kay rivalry changed forever. Liz Foster, afflicted with a near-terminal illness, informs Jill she was adopted. After much investigation, it is revealed that Kay is Jill's biological mother. Learning the truth on their wedding night, Billy and Mackenzie have their marriage annulled (since they are biological first cousins). Since then, Kay and Jill have made peace and formed a genuine (though sometimes contentious) mother-daughter bond. Their relationship even managed to survive and grow stronger after the 2007 revelation that Jill's son with Phillip II was switched at birth by Kay. A series of DNA tests revealed that new Genoa City resident Ethan "Cane" Ashby (Daniel Goddard) was Jill's son and the mild mannered Aussie helped Jill and Kay come to grips with their feud and the events of the baby switch. Family and friends grew concerned when Katherine began suffering from "senior moments" and, later in 2008, they began to suspect she was drinking again. In fact, it was Marge Cotrooke (Kay's doppelganger) who was drinking and Katherine's cagey behavior was due in part to protecting Marge's secret while supporting her recovery. Everyone believed Kay died in a serious car accident but Marge was actually killed. Jill was devastated by the loss of her mother, admitting openly that she loved her former rival. The real Kay lost her memory, assumed Marge's life as a waitress and was later kidnapped until being reunited with her family.

Jill remained suspect of Katherine, even after she returned, thinking it was really Marge trying to con the family. DNA results proved the woman claiming to be Katherine was not related to Jill, starting a series of events that dramatically reshaped the Chancellor family. In 2009, the true paternity came to light that Jill was not Kay's biological daughter after all. This reignited the feud and helped Billy and Mac rekindle their love for each other. Kay's senior moments were revealed to be caused by lime disease which also caused her to imagine the whole baby switch. The true Phillip Chancellor III returned, revealing he had sent Cane to Genoa City to heal Jill and Kay's pain. Phillip III revealed he had faked his death to hide the fact that he is gay, a plot that did not make sense, and that was very negatively received by long-term fans. Phillip stayed in Genoa City very briefly, to try and rebuild his relationship with his son (Chance Chancellor), mother, and Nina, and then before soon being written out.

Later, Jill helped Katherine track down her real long-lost child. Mogul Tucker McCall was revealed to be Katherine's biological son even though Kay thought she had given birth to a daughter. Tucker had hatched a plan to take over Chancellor Industries while Katherine and Jill were preoccupied with their search for Katherine's daughter. As a result, Katherine lost her company and partially blamed this on Jill who was sleeping with Tucker. Tucker and Katherine have since started to develop a relationship while Jill and Katherine remain at odds.

== The Abbotts and the Newmans ==
By the early 1980s, most members of the Brooks and Foster families had been recast, and when The Young and the Restless expanded to an hour in 1980, many lead actors said they could not sustain themselves on an hour show and quit. Show creator William J. Bell told himself he would wait for one more major departure before making big changes. When Jaime Lyn Bauer, who played Lorie, quit in 1982 due to exhaustion, Bell took the opportunity to write out all of the Brooks and Fosters, save Jill. Gradually, the focus shifted from the Brooks and Foster families to the Williams, Abbott, and Newman families.

The Williams family was introduced in 1978. Police Detective Carl Williams (Brett Hadley) and his wife Mary (Carolyn Conwell) had their hands full with their promiscuous teenage son Paul (Doug Davidson). Paul had a fling with Nikki Reed (Melody Thomas Scott) and gave her a sexually transmitted disease. He then went on to romance prostitute Cindy Lake, as well as April Stevens (Cynthia Eilbacher), who had his daughter, Heather. April left town after Paul ended things with her and without telling Paul she was pregnant. Soon after, Paul marries Lauren Fenmore (Tracy E. Bregman).

Eric Braeden joined the cast in 1980 as sinister tycoon Victor Newman, in what was a short-term role that soon became a permanent fixture. Victor was so menacing to his wife Julia (Meg Bennett) that he locked her boyfriend Michael Scott (Nicholas Benedict) in a bomb shelter constructed in the basement and forced him to watch Victor and Julia's bedroom via closed-circuit camera. Bell saw something in Braeden's performance and since the show had few strong male characters, elevated him to star status. Soon after, Victor went to a strip club and met Nikki, who at the time was working as a stripper. She married Victor in a lavish 1984 wedding and their love-hate relationship has gone through the birth of two children, Victoria (Heather Tom/Sarah Aldrich/Amelia Heinle) and Nicholas (Joshua Morrow), as well as many divorces, affairs, and remarriages.

Bell also expanded the role of the Abbott family. In addition to John and his son Jack, daughters Ashley (Eileen Davidson) and Traci (Beth Maitland) were introduced. Stories were phased in regarding the corporate rivalry between the Abbott's Jabot Cosmetics and the Newman's Newman Enterprises. The personal lives of both the Abbotts and the Newmans also became a major focus. A four-way quadrangle became a major storyline in the 1980s-90s with Victor marrying Ashley and Jack marrying Nikki. Meanwhile, the insecure Traci became involved in a love triangle with her rival Lauren and rock star Danny Romalotti (Michael Damian), before marrying gardener-turned-business executive Brad Carlton (Don Diamont). The Abbott and Newman family rivalry is further put to the test in 2010 after Billy Abbott and Victoria Newman marry.

By the late 1980s, most members of the Williams family had been phased out.

== Lauralee Bell ==
A relatively controversial fixture on the show for several decades was Bell's daughter, Lauralee. Lauralee debuted in 1983 in a bit part as Christine "Cricket" Blair. As Lauralee grew up, her character became more and more prominent, to the point where, in 1988, storylines had four different men in love with her. Longtime fan favorite Terry Lester, who played Jack Abbott, left the show in 1989 and blamed her partly, claiming that the excessive airtime given to Cricket drowned out the other performers.

Chris became the love interest of the character of Danny Romalotti and was involved in a love quadrangle between him, Phillip Chancellor III and Nina Webster throughout most of 1987 and the first half of 1988. Chris, who was saving herself for marriage, then had an unconsummated romance with Scott Grainger (which ended abruptly when he was revealed to be her half-brother) and was later a victim of a "date-rape" where Derek raped Christine. It seemed as if Chase and Chris would become romantically involved during the time she was healing from being raped, but the story never came to fruition, even though Cricket's mother gave her blessing for the two (Cricket and Chase) of them to marry if that's what the future held for them before she died of AIDS. Christine would later marry Danny and then Paul before becoming an attorney and asking people to refer to her as "Chris" and remained a somewhat central heroine. At one point in 1996, the show hinted at a romance between Christine and the much older Victor Newman, but negative viewer reaction killed the story. Later, Christine began to work with Michael Baldwin (Christian LeBlanc) who had stalked her years earlier. After a brief engagement to Michael, Christine and Paul reunited but eventually split again. By 2004 or so, Lauralee Bell's marriage and children, as well as a successful clothing store, diminished her airtime and paved the way for other characters. In early 2005, she announced her move from contract to recurring status. In May 2007, it was announced that Bell would appear as her character on The Young and the Restless's sister soap, The Bold and the Beautiful.

== The Barbers and the Winters ==
The Young and the Restless was one of the first soaps to successfully integrate a number of African American actors into its cast. In the mid-1980s, The Young and the Restless created a storyline which revolved around Tyrone Jackson (Phil Morris), a young black man, being made up in whiteface to bring down a mafia kingpin, but most of the characters were written out within a few years. In 1989, the program Generations earned critical acclaim for casting an entire African American family from the show's inception. Established hits like The Young and the Restless were criticized as the show had a low number of minorities.

As a response, Tonya Lee Williams and Victoria Rowell joined The Young and the Restless in the early 1990s as the Barber sisters, Olivia and Drucilla, nieces of the Abbott's maid Mamie Johnson (Veronica Redd). They proved to be very successful and they interacted fairly well with the established characters. Nathan Hastings (Nathan Purdee/Randy Brooks/Adam Lazarre-White), the only other remaining black character on the show before 1990, was married off to Olivia, before dying in a hit and run car accident in 1996. Two more black characters, Neil Winters, played by former Generations alum Kristoff St. John and his brother Malcolm played by Shemar Moore, would be introduced in 1991 and 1994, respectively.

However, the core black characters largely interacted amongst only themselves; they would most often act as bit parts in scenes with the other characters. In the case of the Winters brothers, and the Barber sisters, they were shown to usually swap each other's partners when a "shake-up" was needed in the romantic scheme of the story. This led to a seemingly never-ending love quadrangle between the four characters. Later actions have proven that this choice was due to the supposition that it was ostensibly "too controversial" to have an interracial pairing. Indeed, a pairing in the late 1990s between Neil Winters and Victoria Newman was axed by CBS executives, who were rumored to have received many angry phone calls and letters by viewers in the South. In 2004, a love affair between Phyllis Summers (Michelle Stafford) and chemist Damon Porter (Keith Hamilton Cobb) was prominently featured, despite concerns that the interracial pairing would be scrapped just like the one that was written before. While the romance between Phyllis and Damon did eventually come to an end, the writers followed up by having Phyllis' son Daniel (Michael Graziadei) become involved with Drucilla and Malcolm's daughter Lily (Christel Khalil). Daniel and Lily married in 2006.

Lily and Daniel's marriage was short-lived. After they divorced, Lily moved on with Cane (the man pretending to be Jill's son). Lily and Cane tried to have a family but complications, including suffering through an ectopic pregnancy and thinking that Cane had fathered a child with another woman, Chloe. Despite these events, the two married in 2009. Lily was diagnosed with cancer. She and Cane asked Mackenzie to act as a surrogate to help them start a family despite Lily's medical condition.

== Other minority characters ==
From 1999 to 2004, David Lago played Raul Guittierez, a member of a Cuban family who became part of a circle of friends that included Billy, Mackenzie, J.T. Hellstrom (Thad Luckinbill), Rianna Miner (Rianna Loving/Alexis Thorpe), and Brittany Hodges (Vanessa Lee Evigan/Lauren Woodland). Raul's brother Diego (Diego Serrano/Greg Vaughan) arrived in town in 2001 after running away from the family several years prior. After helping his younger brother during a difficult time, Diego had flings with Nicholas' wife Sharon (Sharon Case) and Victoria.

The show has been less successful with incorporating Asian American characters. In 1994, the Vietnamese Volien family was introduced to the show, consisting of Luan (Elizabeth Sung) and her two children, Keemo (Philip Moon) and Mai (Marianne Rees). Jack Abbott had fought in Vietnam, and had a love affair with a woman named Luan who, unbeknownst to him, was pregnant with his son when he was forced to leave during the fall of Saigon, By coincidence, twenty plus years later, Luan ends up owning a Vietnamese restaurant that just happens to be in Genoa City, Wisconsin. Luan does not keep up with the news of local prominent citizens and does not know that Jack is also in Genoa City. The character is shown with white hair, appearing to be around 60 years old, however, when Jack and Luan finally reconnect, Luan now has black hair and appears to be around 45. Luan and Jack quickly rekindle their old flame and get married in a ceremony that incorporated Vietnamese and Western traditions, and then she is suddenly diagnosed with a terminal unnamed disease. After her death in 1996, her two children were written out and rarely mentioned since. Keemo was angry with his father for keeping his mother's illness from him and never spoke to him again. Mai, who was born in Vietnam but raised in the US suddenly went back to Vietnam for no apparent reason even though she did not speak the language and was extremely upset at the thought of leaving Genoa City. In short, they disposed of the Asian family.

In 2022, a new attempt to incorporate an Asian actor is being made. Jack receives mysterious messages leading him to find that his son, Keemo, has died. It's believed that Keemo had a daughter who is now anxious to meet her grandfather. Hopefully the production does a better job with this storyline.

Eric Steinberg played Hong Kong business executive Ji Min Kim with business ties to Jack and as a love interest for Jill. The character was killed off in a contrived murder-mystery plot in 2007.

== Recasting ==
While heavy recasting is considered to have doomed some series such as Ryan's Hope and Love Is a Many Splendored Thing, The Young and the Restless' has been successful at replacing some of its lead characters with other actors. Most often, major characters are played by the same actor for decades; if they left the show, the characters left with them. But in the case of The Young and the Restless, their replacements were often popular and remade the character in their own image. When William Grey Espy left the show in 1975, the role of Snapper Foster was given to then-unknown actor David Hasselhoff. Peter Bergman has won three Emmy Awards after replacing Lester as Jack Abbott. And Jess Walton, who took over the role of Jill Foster Abbott after original cast member Brenda Dickson was fired in 1987 amid a fallout with producers, has earned two Emmys.

In 2004, Joan Van Ark joined the cast as Gloria Fisher, Michael Baldwin's mother, remaining until early 2005. She was replaced by Judith Chapman.

The role of Lily Winters was made popular by actress Christel Khalil. The Young and the Restless recast Lily with Davetta Sherwood in 2005 but the role was eventually given back to Khalil in 2006. The 2005 the role of Mackenzie Browning was recast from Ashley Bashioum to Rachel Kimsey. Kimsey was released from her contract in May 2006 and the character returned in 2009 played by Clementine Ford. The recasting of Mac took place shortly after the character of Billy Abbott returned, played by Billy Miller. There have been many recasts of the role of Billy Abbott, Phyllis Newman, and Victoria Newman.

The role of Colleen Carlton, Brad and Traci's daughter, who had been played by Lyndsy Fonseca for several years was recast in January 2006 with Adrianne Leon. Leon was let go in June 2007 and replaced with former Home and Away actress Tammin Sursok, who left in October 2009 after her character died.

In late 2006, The Young and the Restless recast the role of popular daytime villainess, Sheila Carter. Having been played by Kimberlin Brown on both The Young and the Restless and The Bold and the Beautiful, the character was later handed over to Michelle Stafford, who also plays Phyllis. Although this recast was mainly storyline-directed, since Sheila had plastic surgery to look like Phyllis, fans of Sheila have expressed mixed opinions regarding Brown's absence in the role.

== Social issues ==
Unlike other soaps in the 1980s or 1990s, The Young and the Restless avoided preachy social issues. When they did touch on such issues as abortion, the homeless crisis or AIDS, it was only as a plot device with a few facts and statistics thrown in for effect. For example, when Ashley aborted Victor's child in the 1980s, any viewers or scholars who may have looked for a serious story on the pros and cons of abortion would have been disappointed. Ashley only aborted her baby because Victor's wife Nikki was then presumed to be terminally ill, and Ashley did not want to cause her pain. After learning of her abortion, Victor ripped her to shreds, causing a devastated Ashley to lose her mind and wind up in an insane asylum.

One social issue which was too hot for The Young and the Restless audience of the mid-'70s was homosexuality. In the mid-1970s, Kay befriended an overweight, unhappy housewife named Joann Curtis. Kay moved Joann into her home and helped her get a better self-image. Soon, Kay's son Brock wondered about all the time the ladies were spending together, as Kay planned a special vacation to Hawaii for herself and Joann. The ratings dropped and outraged fan letters poured in. Bell quickly dropped the relationship, wrote Joann out, and the show stabilized.

== Glow by Jabot ==
1999 brought forth a new teen scene on The Young and the Restless, including Jill Abbott's now teenage son Billy Abbott, his rich girlfriend Brittany Hodges, his friend Raul Guittierez, Raul's girlfriend Rianna Miner, and the "plain Jane" oddball Mackenzie Browning, later revealed to be Katherine Chancellor's granddaughter. Mackenzie blossomed from quiet girl into the Prom Queen and, on prom night, shared a kiss with the Prom King, Billy. That summer, as Mac and Billy's relationship grew, the whole group moved into the Glow by Jabot house along with J.T. Hellstrom, who began dating Brittany. In 2004, Billy and Mac were married but were interrupted on their wedding night by Jill, who revealed they were first cousins. The marriage was annulled and they each left town. Damaged by their relationship, Billy and Mac returned to Genoa City separately on different occasions. Mac returned and began dating J.T.; she miscarried his baby and left to work with refugees in Darfur. Billy returned with a gambling problem and left again to work for Jabot in New York and Hong Kong.

Brittany Hodges and J.T. broke up after he cheated on her with Brittany's mother. She started dating Raul and, after they were robbed, wound up working for mobster Bobby Marsino at his strip club. She and Raul broke up once he found out about her new job; later Brittany was electrocuted on stage during a performance. Everyone suspected Kevin Fisher was behind the incident but was revealed to be part of Bobby's mob dealings. This made Raul realize he really loved Brittany, however it was too late. She lived through the ordeal, but soon came to realize she loved Bobby, despite Raul's attempts to get her back. The two married and Brittany had a baby boy and left town to be with Bobby who was hiding in witness protection. Raul left town and Bobby was later killed.

== Kevin Fisher and the Baldwin Family ==
Drucilla returned in 2002 with her daughter, Lily Winters. Neil recovered from his dependency on alcohol thanks to Lily and Dru at the same time Lily began an online "relationship" with a guy who claimed to be a 17-year-old. Lily met the man from the internet, Kevin Fisher, at his apartment. The two had sex and Lily got chlamydia. Lily's best friend, Colleen Carlton, tried to convince Lily to stay away from Kevin but Lily was in love. Kevin's dark side emerged, however, when he grew tired of Colleen's treatment of him. Kevin locked Colleen in the refrigerator and set the building on fire. J.T. rescued Colleen and Lily broke it off with Kevin.

The depth of Kevin's darkness was explored after it was revealed he was Michael Baldwin's younger half-brother. Kevin had been abused as a child by his father and locked in closets. He felt that Michael abandoned him and even confronted Michael with a gun. Michael was able to reach out to his misguided brother and heal their relationship. Their mother, trashy Gloria Fisher, moved to Genoa City after Kevin's breakdown. Gloria felt remorse and guilt over letting Kevin's evil father, Tom Fisher, abuse her son.

Gloria was a gold digger but soon fell for John Abbott. She lied to John about her family, even going so far as to hire actors to play her sons. Eventually, Michael and Kevin were revealed to be her sons and John was furious, especially after what Kevin had done to John's granddaughter Colleen. He forgave Gloria and they married, despite strong warnings from his children Jack and Ashley. Ashley and Gloria sparked up a horrid rivalry with each other. In a misguided attempt to discredit Ashley, Gloria poisoned a sample of a Jabot face cream. The plan backfired when a customer, died. The resulting scandal nearly took down Jabot and the entire Abbott family. Gloria kept her role in this a secret despite a judicial order that no Abbott be allowed to run Jabot again.

Shortly afterwards, "Terrible Tom" Fisher came to Genoa City looking for Gloria's new money. Tom's return forced Kevin to confront his demons. Gloria tried to keep Tom at bay but he teamed up with psychopath Sheila Carter, whom he had no idea of how "bad" she was, to bring down Lauren Fenmore. They kidnapped Lauren but Tom ran away when Sheila went through with her plot to blow up Lauren on the yacht. Michael watched the yacht explode and believed his fiancé was dead. However, Lauren showed up at the chapel the night before their wedding. Tom's role in this plot was revealed and he was eventually found dead. Although there was no shortage of suspect (or motives), John Abbott was revealed to be the killer and was sent to prison.

Ashley and Jack blamed Gloria for all that had happened to their family, including John's arrest. They refused to listen to John when he insisted he loved Gloria and his wishes she be taken care of be honored. John died in prison, but not before Jack was able to convince an ailing John to re-write his will. When a new will surfaced, Gloria was kicked out of the Abbott mansion. She moved in with Michael and Lauren, who had just given birth to their son, Fenmore. Kevin, meanwhile, sought redemption and eventually gained forgiveness from Lily and Colleen.

== Victor's downfall ==
Victor found himself at odds with his children - Nicholas and Victoria - as well as Nikki and his longtime rival Jack over his unethical business dealings in his life. Victor went to war against Jabot Cosmetics and nearly put Jabot out of business. Nick discovered Victor's corrupt methods and turned Victor over to federal authorities. Victor was nearly sentenced to prison but was given community service and fined twenty million dollars (which was awarded to Jabot). Victoria was disgusted with Victor's action and left for Italy while Nick's relationship with his father remained severely strained.

Victor's downfall forced him to explore some of his inner demons, including coming face-to-face with his now elderly father, played by veteran character actor George Kennedy. Nick accompanied Victor on his trip to visit his father, essentially restarting their fragile relationship. With the help of Nikki, Victor managed to regain his children's trust and made them co-CEOs of Newman. Victor then joined forces with Nikki and Phyllis to form NVP. His involvement with the upstart company was short-lived, however. Victor was diagnosed with Temporal Lobe Epilepsy, a condition of which Jack took advantage. Victor returned from a spiritual journey he suffered more seizures. He was eventually cured but was touched by how supportive Jack had been during the ordeal. Victor quickly learned of Jack's deception but continued to go along with it, making Jack think that the two rivals had actually grown close and were friends. Victor found out that Jack had secretly obtained control of Jabot, against judicial orders, and set an elaborate plot in motion to bring Jack down - after Victor financed Jack's botched run for State Senate.

Later, two new important figures would enter Victor's life. Victoria's close friend Sabrina came to Genoa City and began a relationship with Victor. Also, Victor brought his son, Victor Jr., to Genoa City after the young man's mother died. Victor Jr. preferred to be called Adam and took a strong dislike to his siblings Nick and Victoria, who he thought were over privileged country-club snobs. Despite his inexperience, Victor was impressed by Adam's educational background and work ethic and brought him into the Newman Enterprises Senior Management team. Victoria and Nick repeatedly disagreed with Adam's ideas, creating a lot of tension. Victor was happy with Sabrina but, in a series of horrific events, she was taken from him in a brutal car accident with Nikki's lover, David Chow. Tortured by the death of his lover and their unborn child, Victor fled to Mexico in search of the mobster responsible for the car accident. Adam used Victor's absence to his advantage and ousted Nick and Victoria from Newman Enterprises, appointing himself CEO while the rest of Victor's family searched for their missing father.

Victor returned to Genoa City thanks to Nikki's help, even though he blamed her for Sabrina's death. Victor was severely upset with Adam's behavior and blackballed him from Newman Enterprises and all other corporations. Adam was angry and teamed up with Jack to frame Victor for murder. The plan nearly worked, forcing Victor to flee into exile where he was later rescued by Ashley Abbott. Adam was the only one punished for involvement in the crime and sent to prison, where his eyesight began to vanish.

== 1994 O.J. Simpson trial impact on ratings ==
Along with every other daytime soap, The Young and the Restless has suffered audience erosion, with very noticeable losses during the O.J. Simpson trial. For many months, The Young and the Restless was not shown at its regularly scheduled time during the televised Simpson trial. A trailer sometimes ran at the bottom of the TV screen informing viewers to use their VCRs to tape Y&R at random hours like 2:27 a.m., 4:26 a.m. There was not a set re-broadcast time after midnight, and this was years before the internet was in homes, which would have allowed viewers to watch online as you can in 2014. Many long-time viewers simply gave up trying to figure out when to set their VCRs, and gave up permanently on the show. Y&R permanently lost millions of viewers as a result. Every year after the Simpson trial, Y&R has mostly lost viewers.

In the 2000s they took some power away from longtime producer Edward J. Scott and head writer Kay Alden, and started to instead rely on head writer John F. Smith and later (in 2006) head writer/executive producer Lynn Marie Latham.

== Malcolm Winters controversy ==
Another highly publicized move was the 2004 rehiring of Shemar Moore to reprise his role as Malcolm for a limited run. Moore was extremely popular with all viewers, particularly African-American viewers, and the show lost a healthy chunk of that demographic upon his 2002 departure. Although fans were happy to see him return, Malcolm's new storyline, exposed him as having sex with his brother's wife while under the influence of prescription drugs. Viewers learned that Malcolm, not his brother Neil, was the biological father of Lily. Viewers were outraged by this, commenting that Malcolm basically raped Dru as she was barely cognizant due to medicine.

Malcolm returned again in the Fall of 2014, for only two days, trying to help his now blind brother Neil. He returned again in 2019 after receiving news of Neil's death.

== Cassie/Mariah ==
In another high-profile storyline, Nicholas and Sharon's teenage daughter Cassie was killed off. In spite of rave reviews from the soap press, the ratings remained consistent. In August 2006, the show killed off patriarch John Abbott. These episodes nudged The Young and the Restless to some of its highest ratings (6.4 million viewers in August 2006) in some time. In 2014, it was revealed that Cassie actually had an identical twin sister named Mariah (played by the same actress as Cassie), who was raised by an unloving woman. It was revealed in the Fall of 2014, that Sharon gave birth to twins, and did not realize it, as both babies were immediately taken away and adopted to two different mothers.

The writers also created a number of retcon storylines during the 2000s. In 2003, it was revealed that Jill was adopted, and Kay was actually her birth mother; Billy and Mac were told about this moments before they consummated their relationship. In 2004, Jill's birth father Arthur Hendricks (David Hedison) briefly visited, and mother and daughter fought over him while Kay again battled her drinking problem. Then it was revealed that Arthur was not Jill's father, but Lauren Fenmore's father was actually Jill's biological dad, making Jill and Lauren half-sisters.

== Brad Carlton/Nazi plot ==
Another controversial storyline involving Brad Carlton was his largely unexplained alter ego named George Kaplan in 2006. Fans had a very negative reaction to the introduction of a plot surrounding Nazis and artwork involving Brad's mother during WWII. Brad's mother supposedly was in her early 20s during World War II, which would make Brad's mother in her mid to late 80s in 2006. However, the actress who played Brad's mother appeared to be around 60, far too young for this role. Fans complained that the Nazi artwork plot made no sense at all, along with Brad's age and the age his mother was supposed to be. The plot was completely dropped without mention, Brad then had an affair with Sharon Newman, and then was killed off trying to save Sharon's son Noah when he fell through ice on a frozen lake. The actor Don Diamont then transferred to Y&R's "sister show" The Bold and the Beautiful as a new character named Bill.

In 2007, the show began to reintroduce infamous story plots to draw back some devoted fans. The infamous Jack vs. Victor war began to surface again in November 2006, with Jack secretly manipulating Victor's new company, NVP Retreats (Nikki, Victor, Phyllis), and Victor wanting revenge. Also, with the death of John, the basic "estate inheritance" storyline, made famous with many characters including Kay and Jill, played out between the Abbott children and Gloria, who was John's wife before he died.

Years 2006 and 2007 also saw two murder-mystery plots, as Carmen Mesta (Marisa Ramirez) and Ji Min Kim (Eric Steinberg) were killed off.

=== Out of the Ashes ===
One highly publicised story was the culmination of a months-long storyline involving the construction of a casino and resort at the fictional city of Clear Springs; this story ended in the so-called "Clear Springs Explosion." This event was marketed as The Young and the Restless: Out of the Ashes, which aired from October 19 to October 26, 2007, in which a building collapsed due to the aforementioned explosion and many central characters were injured somehow. The Out of the Ashes storyline is notable for being the first time The Young and the Restless has used a special title sequence for a particular storyline. However, the extra budget dollars expended on Out of the Ashes - approximately US$2,000,000 - produced little or no bump upward in the ratings.

Victims trapped inside the rubble were: Jack Abbott (Peter Bergman), Sharon Abbott (Sharon Case), Nicholas Newman (Joshua Morrow), a pregnant Victoria Newman (Amelia Heinle), Adrian Korbel (Eyal Podell), Noah Newman (Hunter Allan), Amber Moore (Adrienne Frantz), Paul Williams (Doug Davidson), Lauren Fenmore Baldwin (Tracey E. Bregman), Detective Maggie Sullivan (Tammy Lauren), Katherine Chancellor (Jeanne Cooper), Cane Ashby (Daniel Goddard) and J.T. Hellstrom (Thad Luckinbill).
