= Billy Abbott =

- The Young and the Restless character
- Jason Thompson as Billy Abbott
- Portrayed by: David Tom (1999–2002, 2014); Ryan Brown (2002–2003); Scott Seymour (2006); Billy Miller (2008–2014); Burgess Jenkins (2014–2016); Jason Thompson (2016–present); (and others)
- Duration: 1993–2003; 2006; 2008–present
- First appearance: July 7, 1993
- Created by: William J. Bell
- Introduced by: Edward J. Scott (1993, 1999); David Shaughnessy (2002); Lynn Marie Latham (2006); Josh Griffith (2008)
- David Tom as Billy Abbott
In-universe information
- Other names: William Foster Abbott
- Occupation: Businessman; Restaurant Owner; Editor-in-chief; Magazine Owner; Bartender
- Parents: John Abbott; Jill Abbott
- Siblings: Jack Abbott; Traci Abbott Connelly; Ashley Abbott (legal); Phillip Chancellor III
- Spouse: Mackenzie Browning (2003); Chloe Mitchell (2009); Victoria Newman (2010–2014) (Note: Billy and Victoria have been married three times. The first ceremony on May 14, 2010, was not legal. They legally married for the first time on September 9, 2010. They divorced on November 28, 2011, and remarried a month later on December 24, 2011, (the episode aired on December 26, 2011). The couple divorced again on September 9, 2014. However, they were married consecutively from 2010 to 2014.); Sally Spectra (m. 2026)
- Children: Delia Abbott; Johnny Abbott; Katie Abbott; Ruby Spectra Abbott
- Grandparents: Robert Abbott; Liz Foster (adoptive); Neil Fenmore; Bill Foster (adoptive)
- Aunts and uncles: Snapper Foster (adoptive); Greg Foster (adoptive); Lauren Fenmore
- Nieces and nephews: Keemo Volien Abbott; Scotty Grainger; Chance Chancellor; Colleen Carlton; Kyle Abbott; Abby Newman (legal); Fenmore Baldwin

Billy Abbott is a fictional character from The Young and the Restless, an American soap opera on the CBS network. Created by William J. Bell as the son of John Abbott (Jerry Douglas) and Jill Abbott (Jess Walton), the character is currently portrayed by Jason Thompson. The character is known for being a "spoiled rich boy," a "screw up," and for his gambling addictions and consumption of alcohol.

Billy Abbott was introduced during the July 7, 1993, episode. For the character's first six-year period, he appeared as a minor, portrayed by various child actors. In 1999, David Tom began portraying Billy as a teenager. Tom was acclaimed for his portrayal, winning a Daytime Emmy Award in 2000. In 2002, Tom opted not to renew his deal with the soap and the role was recast with Ryan Brown. Brown only portrayed the role for a year after he was let go in a storyline-dictated departure. In 2006, Scott Seymour began playing the character; however, he too was let go after three months.

Two years later in 2008, Billy Miller took over the role until his exit in 2014. Miller's performance in the role was popular with audiences and critics, and garnered him two wins of the Daytime Emmy Award for Outstanding Supporting Actor in a Drama Series in 2010 and 2013, and one a Daytime Emmy Award for Outstanding Lead Actor in a Drama Series in 2014. In 2014, David Tom returned to the role following Miller's exit; his return was short-lived when he was replaced by Burgess Jenkins the same year. In 2015, Jenkins announced his decision to depart the soap. Thompson first appeared in the role on January 13, 2016. Thompson has received critical acclaim for his performances in the role, winning Outstanding Lead Actor in a Drama Series in 2020, and earning another nomination in 2022.

== Casting ==
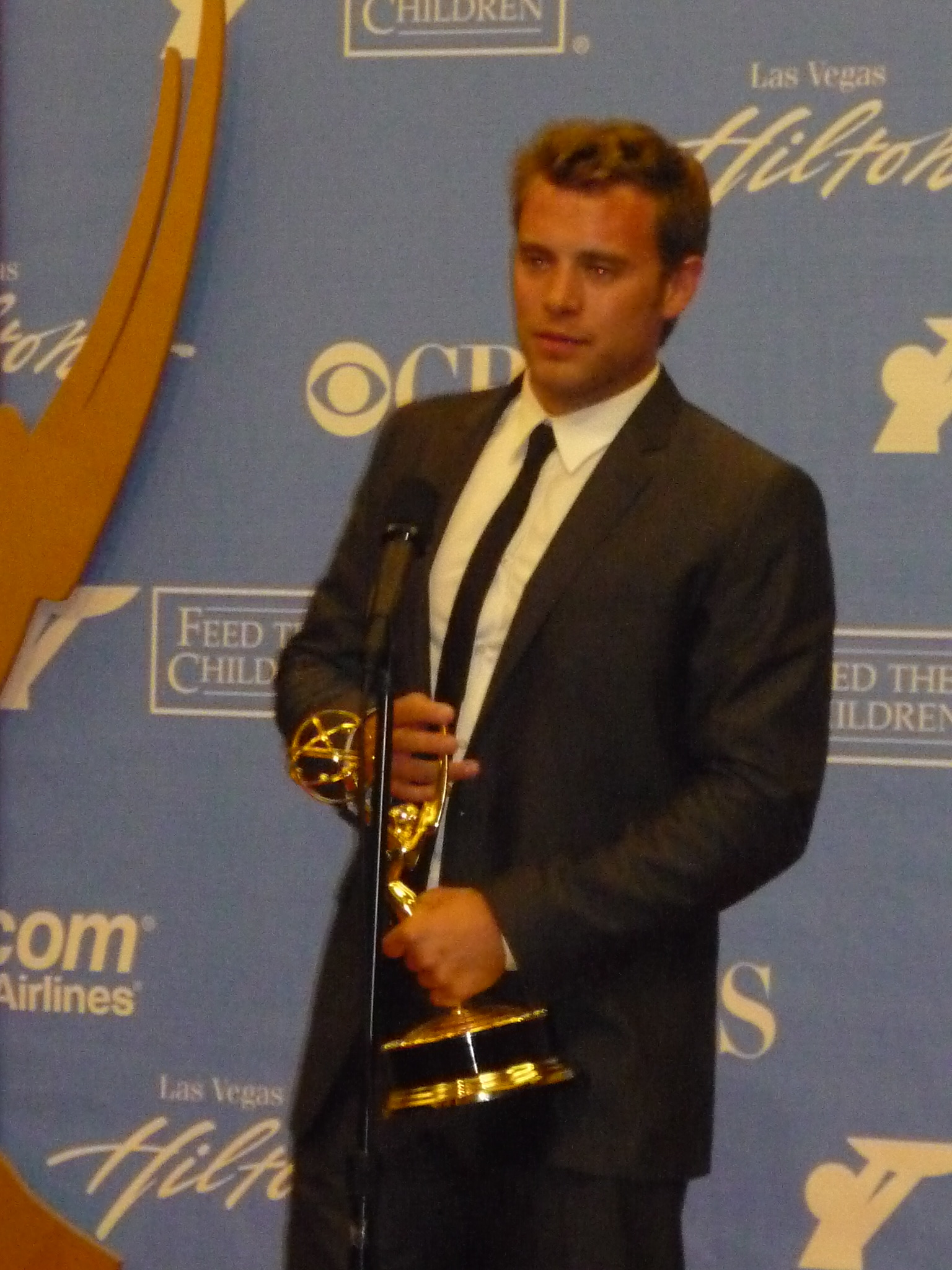
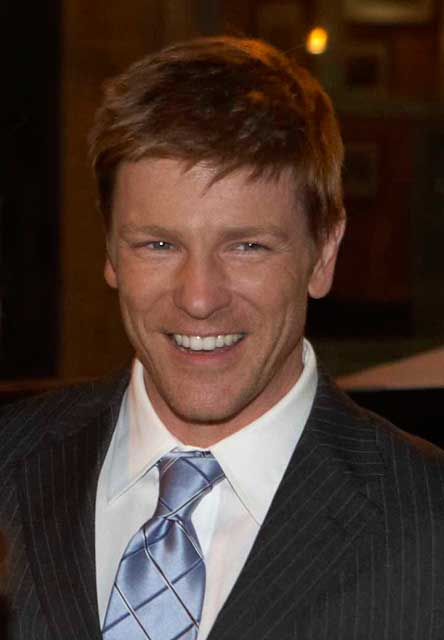
Actor Billy Miller (left) portrayed the role of Billy Abbott for six years, from 2008 to 2014. Burgess Jenkins (right) was the second actor to portray the role of Billy following Miller's exit, from 2014 to 2016.

Billy was introduced in July 1993 and grew up naturally until 1999, when the producers decided to age the character. Up to 1999, the character was portrayed by child actors, first by a set of twins named Katrin and Margret Ingimarsdottir, then by Brett Sherman, Shane Silver, Blake Pontello, Josh Michael Rose and Scotty Leavenworth. When the character was rapidly aged, the character was first portrayed by David Tom, brother of the acclaimed Heather Tom, who first aired on July 23, 1999. "I auditioned five times," said Tom at the time. "Every time, Heather would call and ask, 'How was it? Did you feel good about it?'" When Tom received the role, he said, "She [Heather] was very excited. I probably won't have too many scenes with my sister. But it's great to be on the same show!" Tom went on to receive a Daytime Emmy Award for Outstanding Younger Actor in 2000. In 2002, Tom opted not to renew his contract but agreed to stay until that August when Billy was written out, and was last seen on August 15, 2002. The character was absent from the series from August to December 2002; even though he was supposed to return much sooner, the casting department allegedly had trouble finding a suitable replacement for Tom.

The role was recast with Ryan Brown, who debuted on December 26, 2002. During Brown's portrayal, rumors started circulating about his dismissal, but when Brown was actually fired, the producers said it was storyline dictated. He last aired on July 16, 2003. In 2006, it was announced that newcomer Scott Seymour would assume the role, debuting on August 15, 2006. However, Seymour was let go after only three months, and his final airdate was November 9, 2006. In 2008, Billy Miller assumed the role as the fourth actor to do so. He first aired on September 19, 2008. Miller won a Daytime Emmy Award for Outstanding Supporting Actor for his portrayal in 2010. In 2011, Miller announced that he would like to leave the series by the end of that summer. However, after months of contract negotiations, Miller agreed to one more year on the series. In November 2013, amidst contract negotiations, Miller opted to leave the soap opera, and it was announced that David Tom, who previously played Billy, would be returning to the role. Miller taped his final scenes on December 19, and last aired on January 30, 2014. Tom taped his first scenes back as Billy on January 7, and returned on February 3, 2014.

On May 23, 2014, Daytime Confidential broke news Tom had been released from the series, with the writers taking Billy in a different direction. Tom last aired on June 19, while Burgess Jenkins took over the role on June 24, 2014. Jenkins announced his casting on social media, revealing: "Thanks so much for the outpouring of warm welcome from all the fans!"

In October 2015, Daytime Confidential announced Jenkins had been fired from the show, and former General Hospital actor Jason Thompson was one of the top choices for recast, following another "plastic surgery arc" storyline. Jenkins last appeared on January 5, 2016.

On December 3, 2015, Entertainment Weekly verified reports Thompson had joined the cast, and began appearing on January 13, 2016.

== Development ==
=== Characterization ===
Billy has been known from a young age to be a spoiled rich boy. As he grew up, he became a playboy and a notorious screwup with a penchant for drinking and gambling. When Miller auditioned for The Young and the Restless in 2008, he didn't know that he would be cast as the infamous Billy Abbott. Still, he enjoys playing the resident bad boy: "But this guy definitely has got an edge, and he is a bit of a bad boy. It’s fun, but he is a bad boy you might want to take home, but he is not the kind that will slit your throat before you get there." Miller also sees Peter Bergman's character of older brother Jack Abbott as a father figure to the younger Billy: "Peter is like an older brother, and it’s interesting because Jack is more of a father figure to Billy than a brother. And since John is gone, and Jack is so much older, and the two of them are so much alike, it’s difficult. Billy could be scummy where he could go down the road, but Jack can be really scummy. However, Jack would never do anything to intentionally hurt his family. Billy knows Jack is holding stuff over his head, and he has to help justify it for himself and carry on."

=== Relationship with Victoria Newman ===
After Victoria Newman's (Amelia Heinle) divorce from J.T., Victoria pursued a relationship with Billy, which her father tried to stop on many occasions, to the point of having them arrested on their wedding day. After being unable to conceive a child, Billy presented Victoria with a baby girl that he adopted illegally, whom they named Lucy. On the storyline, Heinle commented that it was a "good way to conflict and drama to the soap", also stating: "It [storyline] worked, and so they liked it and it spun off from there. So now we are stealing babies together!" When the illegal adoption came to light, Victoria and Billy eventually lost custody of Lucy to Phyllis Newman. Following the loss of the child Victoria adored, their marriage fell apart, and eventually Billy abandoned Victoria and left Genoa City, later revealed to be in Myanmar.

Victoria didn't know what was to come of her marriage and went forward with divorce proceedings, just as Billy's daughter, Delia, was diagnosed with leukemia. Victor had Billy released from a prison in Myanmar where Victor had had him jailed on trumped up charges of drug trafficking and rape, and brought him back to town in hopes of Billy becoming a bone marrow donor for Delia. Eventually, after the pair were officially divorced, Victoria and Billy's mother went searching for him but were unsuccessful, and in a turn of events, she found him in a New York City airport bar, and eventually they reunited, with Victoria cutting her father out of her life after the discovery of his role in Billy's absence. "Victoria is going to be absolutely furious at her dad for what he's done, and understandably so. There is a potential for a huge rift between father and daughter and there will be some consequences for Victor with his relationship with Victoria in light of all that he's done to keep her apart from the man she loves," noted then co-head writer Scott Hamner at the time. He also said that, "The impact of [those] secrets coming to light is going to be very serious in Billy and Victoria's ability to move forward together." Soon after, the pair remarried. However, after returning from their honeymoon, Billy's mistress, a woman named Chelsea Lawson, from Myanmar, arrived on their doorstep, claiming to be pregnant with Billy's child. Her claim was proven true.

== Storylines ==
=== 1993–2006 ===
Jill Foster Abbott (Jess Walton) wanted a baby with her then-husband, John Abbott (Jerry Douglas). After she became pregnant, he urged her to have an abortion because he was too old to become a father, but she refused. Thus, William Foster Abbott was born in 1993. John learned to love Billy, and he fought for him when his marriage to Jill fell apart. Jill paid little attention to her son; John then took Billy to New York City where he attended boarding school. When they returned in 1999, Billy (then played by David Tom) was a teenager. He attended Walnut Grove Academy with his friends and enemies, including Brittany Hodges (Lauren Woodland), J.T. Hellstrom (Thad Luckinbill), Mackenzie Browning (then played by Ashley Bashioum) and Raul Guittierez (David Lago).

To make his place in school, Billy bragged to J.T. and Brittany about partying, and he was invited to a party that resulted in him getting alcohol poisoning, but Raul came to Billy's rescue. Billy had a rocky friendship with Mackenzie, but they began to feel romantic feelings for each other when she kept by his bedside while he recovered. At the Junior Prom, they were crowned Prom King and Queen, and they realized that they had feelings for each other. Billy's mother was not pleased to learn that Billy was hanging out with Katherine Chancellor's (Jeanne Cooper) granddaughter, so Billy and Mackenzie met in secret. Brittany wanted Billy for herself, so she tricked Mackenzie into thinking that she and Billy were having sex by drugging him. Eventually, J.T. spilled that Brittany was lying.

Jack Abbott (Peter Bergman) trapped Billy and Mackenzie in an elevator together, and they finally sorted out their feelings. Jill coped with the fact that Mackenzie was better for Billy than Brittany was. At the time, Billy also gave his niece, Colleen Carlton (then played by Lyndsy Fonseca), advice on how to handle her life in Genoa City after she was sent to live with her grandfather there due to her bad behavior in New York City. Mac and Billy stayed together until Billy decided that they should take their relationship to the next level by having sex, but Mac was not ready. They broke up, but they stayed good friends. Billy came to Mac's rescue when her abusive stepfather, Ralph Hunnicutt, tried to molest her. Ralph attacked him, but Larry Warton (David Fralick) saved him.

Billy (then played by Ryan Brown) decided to do something different with his life, so he went to Louisiana to help Mac's father, Brock Reynolds (Beau Kazer), build houses for the poor. Jill was not happy with the idea. Billy returned after a few months, and he reunited with Mac (then played by Kelly Kruger). They decided to share a loft with Raul and Brittany, who were dating at the time. Billy and Mac soon got married in 2003. After their wedding ceremony, they were both shocked to learn that Billy's mother, Jill, was actually Katherine's daughter, meaning that Billy and Mac were first cousins. The marriage between the two was annulled, and they both left town.

Billy spent the next year in New Orleans and Miami. He returned to Genoa City in 2006 for his father's funeral. He flirted with a waitress, Jana Hawkes (Emily O'Brien), making Jana's boyfriend, Kevin Fisher (Greg Rikaart), jealous. Billy decided to attend Genoa City University to study business while he worked his way up in his family's company. Billy developed a gambling addiction while in Miami, and he still owed money to some bookies there. He stole and pawned an antique scrimshaw of Katherine Chancellor's for money after no one would lend him anything but Katherine found out he had pawned it. Luckily, she was able to get it back from the pawn shop but told Billy that he had proven that she could no longer trust him. Jack found out about his addiction; consequently, he relocated Billy to Hong Kong as the NVP/Jabot Liaison for House of Kim. Jack agreed to pay off the bookies if Billy took the job, hoping this would give Billy a fresh start. Although, Billy moving so far away just broke Jill's heart.

=== 2008–present ===
In 2008, Billy returns as Amber Moore's (Adrienne Frantz) boyfriend "Liam". He was revealed to be the father of Chloe Mitchell's (Elizabeth Hendrickson) baby she was carrying. Chloe married his step-brother Cane Ashby (Daniel Goddard). Billy pursued Cane's former fiancée, Lily Winters (Christel Khalil), and began a relationship with her. Chloe gave birth to Cordelia Abbott on Valentines Day 2009. Cane was believed to be father. Billy had an affair with Jack's wife, Sharon Abbott (Sharon Case), and was a candidate in her paternity of her baby, Faith Newman. When Cordelia's paternity was eventually exposed, Chloe and Billy married. Around this time, Mackenzie returned to town. The day before his wedding, he had sex with Sharon. When Sharon ended up pregnant, Jack discovered their affair; however, Sharon's baby was revealed to be Nick's child. Then, Jill and Katherine learned they were not mother and daughter, therefore he wasn't Mackenzie's cousin. Billy began dating Mackenzie again. Chloe and Billy divorced and Chloe took full custody of Delia. After the death of his niece, Colleen, Billy purchased the magazine Restless Style from Nick (Joshua Morrow) and Phyllis Newman (Michelle Stafford), and began publishing scandalous stories, mostly directed at the Newman family. Billy had sex with Heather Stevens.

He later began getting close to one of his enemies, Victoria Newman (Amelia Heinle). They began an affair while she was still married and later in the middle of a divorce. They went to Jamaica and married while intoxicated, and the marriage was invalid. They returned home and decided to continue as a couple. Victoria became pregnant and they bought a house together. However, Victoria lost the baby after arguing with Victor and had difficulty getting pregnant again. Billy paid Primrose Deville (Ellen Greene) $2 million for a newborn baby girl, which he took home to Victoria. They named her Lucy Abbott. It was revealed she was the biological daughter of Daisy Carter (Yvonne Zima) and Daniel Romalotti (Michael Graziadei) as a result of her raping him. Daniel let the couple keep Lucy, however, his mother Phyllis wanted to raise her granddaughter. Phyllis eventually got custody. Billy and Victoria split up. Billy began drinking and gambling again. After going back and forth, they had sex, right before Billy abandoned her again and left for Hong Kong. Later, Delia was diagnosed with acute myeloid leukemia after a prolonged illness sent her to the hospital. Victoria started to track Billy because Delia needed a bone marrow transplant. Billy had been imprisoned in Myanmar on trumped up drug trafficking and rape charges, and Victor agreed to pay off the authorities for his release on the condition that he didn't contact Victoria again. He agreed and returned to Genoa City to be Delia's bone marrow donor in secret.

Victor hired a security guard to escort Billy to New Delhi, India, with a connecting flight in New York City, where Victoria was. The couple reunited and eventually returned home. He bought Restless Style back and regained control of his life. He remarried Victoria. It was later revealed that while Billy was away, he was drugged and taken advantage of by a girl from Myanmar, Chelsea Lawson (Melissa Claire Egan). Chelsea came to Genoa City, pregnant with his child. Chelsea accused Billy of raping her and demanded 3 million dollars for her and the baby to go away. She later professed her love for Billy and asked him to marry her. After catching Chelsea with alcohol, Billy and Victoria invited Chelsea and her mother to live in his home for the duration of her pregnancy. Chelsea tormented Victoria, flaunting her "affair" with Billy and ridiculing Victoria's inability to get pregnant and provide Billy with a child. She called Victoria an "uptight infertile ice queen" and tried to break up her marriage. After the baby was born Chelsea relinquished her parental rights and Billy was given full custody.

In October 2013, Billy leaves Delia and her dog, Dash, alone in his car at night while going into a store to purchase ice-cream after a school play. Dash runs off, causing Delia to run after him. Delia is struck down by a car driven by Adam Newman. She is rushed to the hospital and pronounced dead from her injuries. After Delia's death, Billy embarks on an affair with Kelly Andrews, a woman he meets in his grief support group. In a hostage situation, Billy reveals to Victoria that he cheated on her. Ultimately, Victoria files for legal separation and starts a romance with Stitch Rayburn (Sean Carrigan). When Billy discovers Adam is the driver who killed Delia, he kidnaps him at gunpoint and mentally tortures a confession out of him. Billy and Adam struggle over the gun while they're driving which causes the car to go over a cliff. Billy escapes but Adam is presumed dead after the car explodes in a fiery explosion. Billy and Victoria later welcomed a daughter together, Katherine Rose Abbott named in honor of Victoria's godmother, Katherine Chancellor and Billy's daughter Delia Rose Abbott.

In recent years, Billy has regained closeness with his Abbott siblings, however in early 2016, Billy starts a relationship with Phyllis Summers, although she is married to his half brother, Jack Abbott. This ends up wrecking the relationship between Jack and Billy, and Phyllis ends up breaking up with Billy, although Jack later divorces her. Billy and Phyllis continue to deny their feelings for one another, leading Billy back to his ex-wife, Victoria Newman, however after sharing a passionate kiss with Phyllis, he goes back to her, upsetting Victoria.

In 2017, the closeness of Jack and Phyllis, as well as Jack distancing himself from Billy, leads Billy back to Victoria, but neither one are able to connect on a personal level, so they decide to thrive, as well as they can in a business relationship. As Jack continues to hurt Billy, he also starts to hurt the company he's working for, which is owned by Victoria Newman, Brash and Sassy. Billy manipulates Jacks mother, Dina Mergeron (who is struggling with the early stages of Alzheimer's), and takes a picture of her password, to later hack into Phyllis's Jabot computer. Phyllis finds out about this, and kicks Billy out of the house. After a while, Phyllis and Billy forgive one another, however, Phyllis has a one-night stand with Nick Newman, and in retaliation, Billy sleeps with her daughter Summer Newman, leading to the end of their relationship.

In 2019, Billy rekindles his relationship with Victoria and they end up getting married again. Soon after, Billy appears to start having some mental health issues when Adam returns to town alive. He starts to blame Adam for Delia's death again and begins to have nightmares and dreams about his dead daughter. It becomes evident that Billy is suffering from a split personality disorder and tries to run Adam down with his car but is rescued by Kevin and Chloe from making that mistake. He is placed at the Chancellor boathouse where he finally battles his demons.

== Reception ==
In May 2020, Thompson earned his first (fifth overall) Daytime Emmy Award for Outstanding Lead Actor in a Drama Series for his work as Billy.

Charlie Mason and Richard Simms from Soaps She Knows called the 2023 breakup of Lily and Billy the "Worst Break-Up" in American soap operas of that year, commenting that "The level of commitment — heck, the level of interest — that Young & Restless playboy Billy showed as he and Lily ended their relationship made us wonder anew why we'd ever invested in the pairing in the first place. We've switched from white to red wine with more conflicted feelings (and more feelings, period)."
