= Brittany Hodges =

American soap opera character

- The Young and the Restless character
- Lauren Woodland as Brittany Hodges
- Portrayed by: Vanessa Evigan (1999–2000); Lauren Woodland (2000–2021)
- Duration: 1999–2005; 2018–2021
- First appearance: December 1, 1999
- Last appearance: March 1, 2021
- Created by: Kay Alden
- Introduced by: William J. Bell and Edward J. Scott (1999); Mal Young (2018)
In-universe information
- Other names: Marilyn
- Occupation: Lawyer; Entertainer
- Father: Frederick Hodges
- Mother: Anita Hodges
- Husband: Bobby Marsino (2005); Raul Guittierez (2010–present)
- Sons: Joshua Marsino

Brittany Hodges is a fictional character from the American CBS soap opera The Young and the Restless. Brittany was introduced on December 1, 1999, by former executive producer Edward J. Scott. The role was originated by Vanessa Lee Evigan who departed on February 25, 2000, and was replaced by Lauren Woodland, who debuted on March 7. Brittany's storylines included relationships with Raul Guittierez (David Lago) and J.T. Hellstrom (Thad Luckinbill), as well as marriage to Bobby Marsino (John Enos III) and giving birth to their child, Joshua. Woodland said that the romance with Raul changed the character who was previously manipulative and sexual.

Brittany began working at Bobby's club as a stripper and later a singer, for which she created the stage alter-ego Marilyn. Woodland enjoyed working on this storyline because she is an entertainer in real life. She eventually married Bobby and they had a child together. Bobby died in an accident and Brittany left town on November 2, 2005. The character was well-received; three years after her departure, Luke Kerr of Daytime Confidential said that he missed when the character was on, writing: "It's really too bad that Lauren wasn't snapped up by another soap after leaving Y&R."

== Casting ==
Vanessa Lee Evigan originated the role of Brittany on December 1, 1999, and portrayed the role on a recurring status until February 25, 2000. The role was recast with Lauren Woodland. Woodland first aired in March 2000. She was absent from the series from February to March 2003 when she was in contract negotiations. Dan Kroll of the website SoapCentral noted that Sharon Case, who plays Sharon Newman, was also in contract negotiations so the show could "lose two of its high-profile blonde actresses." That April, it was announced that the actress had opted for a three-year contract. Woodland last appeared in the role of Brittany on November 2, 2005; the character left following her husband's death. Woodland was nominated for a Daytime Emmy Award for her portrayal.

In February 2018, it was reported that Woodland would be returning as Brittany to commemorate with the show's 45th anniversary. Woodland returned on March 28 and 29, 2018. In April 2018, Soap Opera Digest announced that Woodland would return as Brittany for an "indefinite run," the new scenes aired from June 12 to 18, 2018.

Woodland made other appearances on September 12, 2018, and from February 18 to March 13, 2019. She made another appearance on October 1 of the same year. In October 2020, it was announced that Woodland would return to the series in November.

== Development ==
Three years into her duration on the series, Woodland said that Brittany "Started off as this manipulative and very sexual person who would do whatever it took to get what she wanted." She explained that Brittany has always been a "complicated" person but everyone was "able to see that a lot of that behavior came from her insecurities" along with the bad relationship she had with her family, including her parents Frederick (John Martin) and Anita Hodges (Mitzi Kapture). In November 2002, Candace Havens of Zap2It wrote that Brittany had always "been a bit of a schemer" until she found "true love" with the "handsome" Raul Guittierez (David Lago). Woodland stated that Raul is the "First person to give her the love and attention she needs, and she has fallen in love with him because of it. After the car crash, she blamed herself and didn't think she was worthy of his love, but he showed her how much he truly cared about her." However, the relationship didn't work out in the end. Another man Brittany was involved with was J.T. Hellstrom (Thad Luckinbill).

Woodland was thrilled when she found out that her character would be a stripper, because she was an entertainer herself. Nancy Reichardt of Oakland Tribune noted that the storyline was "complete with choreographed song-and-dance routines", the reason for the actress being excited. Woodland explained that "I always wanted to do musical theater" which is why this was a great opportunity. She forms an on-stage alter ego, Marilyn, named after Marilyn Monroe. Her father Frederick attended the club, allured by the new sensation "Marilyn" but is horrified to find out that she is his own daughter. Brittany became involved with the owner of the club she stripped at, Bobby Marsino (John Enos III). She asked Bobby if she could pursue her real passion at the club, singing, instead of stripping, to which he accepted. They became engaged, although she still had feelings for J.T. The show's special eight-thousandth episode was the wedding between Brittany and Bobby.

== Storylines ==
In 1999, Brittany Hodges introduced as part of the new teen scene at Walnut Grove Academy. She was the snobby rich girl, the daughter of a wealthy banker; she was often neglected by her parents. At the time, Brittany had a rich boyfriend, J.T. She soon dumped J.T. when she snagged Billy Abbott (David Tom), an Abbott heir. Brittany wasn't a good influence on Billy, who was trying to make his place in his family's company by pretending to be a party boy. Billy got alcohol poisoning at a party thrown by J.T., and neither J.T. nor Brittany attempted to call the ambulance for fear of getting in trouble themselves. Billy's friend Raul came in time to save him, but his mother, Jill Abbott (Jess Walton), lost respect for Brittany when she didn't help her son.

At the Junior Prom, Brittany realized that Billy was attracted to Mackenzie Browning (Ashley Bashioum), after they won Prom King and Queen. Brittany and Billy were chosen for the Glo By Jabot Kids campaign, and she used the opportunity to keep Billy for herself. She staged having sex with Billy in order for Mac to walk in on them. Billy didn't remember anything, but the truth eventually came out when J.T. accidentally revealed it. Billy and Mac continued to be drawn to one another, and Brittany was left alone, plotting for revenge. Mac began talking to Billy in an Internet chat room under an alias in order to get him to admit to his feelings for her. Brittany found out, and she put Mac's real name on the website. Brittany revealed that Mac was a runaway, but her plan was foiled when Mac's mother, Amanda Browning (Denice Duff), came to Genoa City.

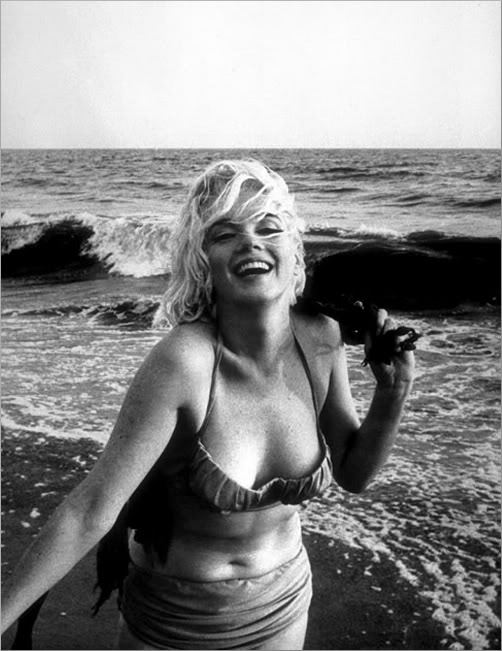
Brittany named her stripper alter ego "Marilyn" after Marilyn Monroe.

Brittany began to spend more time with Raul, who was unlike Brittany's other friends because he did not come from a wealthy background. Brittany shoplifted a sweater for Raul to give to his mother for Christmas. She also helped him with his college applications that he was reluctant to complete. Then, Brittany got the lead role in the school play, Much Ado About Nothing. Raul stepped in to play the male lead when J.T. didn't show up to play his role. Brittany and Raul's feelings culminated when they shared a kiss backstage at the play. Later, Raul supported Brittany when her parents didn't come to see her. In a turn of events, Brittany then dumped Raul after she became afraid by the feeling of being in love. She started dating J.T. again in order to hurt Raul. Raul's ex-girlfriend, Rianna Miner (Alexis Thorpe), returned to town just in time for prom, and she persuaded Brittany and Raul to start dating. After prom, the couple had sex at a campsite. Their lives took different paths when they accepted colleges in different towns. Before they went to school, they got into a car accident where Brittany was driving drunk. She came out of the accident unscathed while Raul was paralyzed for several months. Raul blamed Brittany for the accident, and he told her to go to college and leave him alone. Brittany refused to leave Genoa City, and she stayed with Raul while he recovered. When Brittany and Raul reunited, Brittany's parents, Anita and Frederick, didn't approve of their relationship. They cut Brittany off from their money, and she was forced to live in a cheap apartment with Raul. One night, burglars came into the apartment and held Brittany captive. Luckily, Billy Abbott and Raul arrived in time to save her. After the break-in, Brittany and Raul both moved back in with their families for a short while. During that time, Raul turned down his scholarship from an out-of-town college in order to stay with Brittany and work part-time in Genoa City. Then, Brittany and Raul moved into an apartment with Billy and Mac, who were engaged at the time. In a turn of events, Billy and Mac left town after they were led to believe that they were first cousins. Raul and Brittany rented Mac's room to J.T. in order to make some money.

The peaceful life started to bother Brittany, and she started working as a singer, under the name of "Marilyn", at a club owned by Bobby. She refused to strip, but the crown encouraged her to, and she gave in. She got a lot of money for her performances, and she loved the attention that she was getting. J.T. followed her to work one day, and he discovered what she had been doing. Raul soon found out the truth, and he broke up with Brittany, who thought that Raul would accept her new job. Soon, Brittany and Bobby began to have romantic feelings for each other. Then, Brittany's father went to the club with some of his clients. After discovering Brittany there, he teamed up with Raul in order to get the club shut down. They were successful for a short while, but the club eventually opened again. Bobby Marsino was involved in the mob, and his mobster friends wanted revenge on Brittany's father for shutting the club down. They punished him by electrocuting Brittany when she touched her stripper pole on stage. The right side of her face was severely burned, and Raul and Bobby stayed with her during her recovery. In the end, Brittany found comfort in Bobby, and she left Raul behind. Bobby decided to reopen the club as a cabaret called Marilyn's just for Brittany. His mobster friends were angry with him, but Bobby had the last laugh when he wore a wire to get them to confess to their crimes. They were eventually sent to jail. Meanwhile, Raul found Brittany a plastic surgeon to fix her scars, and he later left town after Brittany rejected him. In 2004, Brittany and Bobby got married at the Chancellor Estate with her parents reluctantly in attendance. After the wedding, Brittany's father gave Bobby a large check and a threat to take care of his little girl. Then, they disowned their daughter.

After the wedding, the newlyweds moved into the Newman Ranch while Bobby's condo was being renovated. During their stay, Bobby became close to Nikki Newman (Melody Thomas Scott). Brittany forced him to move somewhere else away from Nikki. Then, Brittany found out that she was pregnant. Due to complications from her pregnancy, Bobby borrowed money from the mob to pay for Brittany's medical bills. They planned on naming their son Joshua after Bobby's late brother. Before the birth, Bobby and Brittany began to receive anonymous baby gifts that were really from the mob. In order to protect the baby, Brittany told the public that J.T. was the father of the baby. Also, she and Bobby staged a split to throw the mob off course. Nikki found out about Bobby and Brittany's secret, and she was kidnapped by the mob. Bobby rescued Nikki, and J.T. took Brittany to the Newman Ranch for protection, where she gave birth to her son, Joshua Marsino. Mac helped deliver the baby, who was two months premature. Bobby was forced into the Witness Protection Program, and Brittany moved into the Chancellor Estate with baby Joshua, J.T. and Mac. Later, Brittany was able to see Bobby, under heavy security protection, for a short while. Then, she waited for months to hear from him again. Eventually, Brittany received the tragic news that Bobby was killed by a hit-and-run. Distraught, Brittany left Genoa City with Joshua, and they moved back in with her parents in New York City.

Flash forward to 2019, Brittany was hired by Sharon Newman as her lawyer after receiving allegations of the murdering of J.T. Helstrom and disposing of the body with the help of Victoria Newman, Nikki Newman, and Phyllis Summers. In trial, Brittany defended herself against Phyllis, who made a deal with District attorney Christine Williams to work against the other women. Ultimately, Sharon was found guilty and sentenced to 4 years in prison.
