= Luckinbill =

Luckinbill is an English surname. Notable people with the surname include:

- Laurence Luckinbill (born 1934), American actor, playwright, and director
- Thad Luckinbill (born 1975), American actor and producer
