= Mackenzie Browning =

- The Young and the Restless character
- Kelly Kruger as Mackenzie Browning
- Portrayed by: Ashley Bashioum (1999–2002, 2004–2005); Nicole Tarantini (2001); Kelly Kruger (2002–2003, 2018–2019); Rachel Kimsey (2005–2006); Clementine Ford (2009–2010)
- Duration: 1999–2006; 2009–2010; 2018–2019
- First appearance: March 18, 1999
- Last appearance: January 11, 2019
- Created by: Kay Alden
- Introduced by: William J. Bell and Edward J. Scott (1999); William J. Bell, John F. Smith and David Shaughnessy (2004); Maria Arena Bell and Paul Rauch (2009); Mal Young (2018)
- Clementine Ford as Mackenzie Browning
In-universe information
- Other names: Mackenzie Hellstrom; Mackenzie Abbott
- Occupation: Businesswoman; Restaurant owner; Teacher; Waitress; Homeless shelter volunteer
- Family: Chancellor
- Father: Brock Reynolds
- Mother: Amanda Browning
- Husband: Billy Abbott (2003); J.T. Hellstrom (2010–2018)
- Sons: Dylan Hellstrom
- Daughters: Becca Hellstrom
- Stepsons: Reed Hellstrom
- Grandfathers: Gary Reynolds
- Grandmothers: Katherine Chancellor
- Uncles: Tucker McCall
- First cousins: Devon Hamilton

Mackenzie Browning is a fictional character from the CBS soap opera The Young and the Restless. The role was most recently portrayed by Kelly Kruger, who portrayed the role from February 19, 2002, to July 1, 2003, and from March 28, 2018, to January 11, 2019. Previously, the role was portrayed by Ashley Bashioum from 1999 to 2002 and 2004 to 2005, Nicole Tarantini temporarily in 2001, Rachel Kimsey from 2005 to 2006 and Clementine Ford from 2009 to 2010.

Mackenzie is the daughter of Brock Reynolds and granddaughter of Katherine Chancellor. Much of her history revolves around her role in the teen scene of the series, her romance with Billy Abbott, and marriage to J.T. Hellstrom.

== Casting ==
The first actress to portray the character was Ashley Bashioum, who debuted on March 18, 1999. In 2001, while Bashioum had mononucleosis, the role was temporarily portrayed by Nicole Tarantini. The following year, it was announced that Bashioum would be leaving the role after she was unable to reach an agreement with the producers over the negotiation of her contract. Bashioum last aired on February 15, 2002. The role was immediately recast with Kelly Kruger, who took over on February 19, 2002. In 2003, Kruger was one of three actors let go from the soap opera, with her last airdate on July 1, 2003.

In 2004, Bashioum was asked to reprise the role and returned on April 20. However, after an additional year as the character, Bashioum was let go and another immediate recast was named, Rachel Kimsey. Former co-executive producer John F. Smith issued a statement explaining Bashioum's exit, saying they decided to "move the story in a different direction" and "Ashley's school schedule made it difficult". Her final airdate was March 10, 2005, with Kimsey taking over on March 28. In March 2006, it was announced that Kimsey had been let go and there were no plans for another recast. She made her last appearance on May 17, 2006.

"I had come of THE L WORD, which was very creatively open, and to go from something that is so loose and free to a soap opera felt like I walked into a job on Wall Street or some- thing. I think my first scenes that I shot were with Billy [ Miller, ex-Billy]. In the rehears- als, they wanted me to kiss him, which was not something that I [was used to]. And then at one point, they had me in this V-neck, and [former Executive Producer Paul Rauch] called over the loudspeaker that you could see right up my shirt and that it was inappropriate so they sent me back to wardrobe. This was all on my very first day! And then I think it was that day also that I had to wear the chipmunk head and be in Kevin's [nightmare]! Greg [Rikaart, Kevin] and I joke about that because that really was my welcome to daytime. It was really intense and I was not prepared."

— Clementine Ford reflecting on her time on soap (2020)

In March 2009, it was announced that former The L Word star Clementine Ford had been cast as the fourth actress to portray the character. She stated that she knew co-star Greg Rikaart, who portrays Kevin Fisher, and had a "sneaking suspicion" that he had "something to do" with her being cast in the role. She made her debut on April 1, 2009. In September 2010, it was announced that Ford, along with Thad Luckinbill, would be leaving The Young and the Restless. Their final airdate was November 5, 2010. During her time on the soap, Ford was diagnosed with Multiple sclerosis, but initially did not reveal her symptoms as she feared being fired. Ford later called her experience on the soap as "intense" and "like the worst year and a half of [her] life at that point" and quit acting after being let go, but said that she would return to the soap if she was asked to.

In February 2018, it was reported that Kruger would be returning to commemorate with the show's 45th anniversary. Kruger returned on March 28, 2018, and departed April 3, 2018. Kruger reappeared on April 26, 2018. In April 2018, Soap Opera Digest announced that Kruger would remain on the serial for an "indefinite run", Kruger's return aired on June 22, 2018. Kruger made other appearances on November 7, 2018, and January 10 and 11, 2019.

== Storylines ==
=== 1999–2006 ===
Mac runs away from home in St. Louis and befriends Katherine Chancellor (Jeanne Cooper) in a homeless shelter. Mac shows Katherine a letter from her mother, Amanda Browning (Denice Duff) which reveals that Mac's father is actually Katherine's son, Brock Reynolds (Beau Kazer). Mac, Kay and their friend Birdie move into the Chancellor Estate together much to the dismay of co-owner, Jill Abbott (Jess Walton). Mac is arrested when Jill accuses her of stealing but the charges are dropped. Kay fails to find Brock in India and later receives a call that he is dead. A devastated Mac disappears and wanders into the local coffee house, Crimson Lights, and is taken in by Nina Webster (Tricia Cast). Mackenzie returns to the estate to pack her things when she is finally introduced to Brock, who is alive. Mac and Raul Guittierez (David Lago) grow closer, making Billy Abbott (David Tom), Jill's son, jealous. During J.T. Hellstrom (Thad Luckinbill)'s party, Billy collapses from alcohol poisoning. Though Billy and Mackenzie are at odds, she stays at his bedside and prays for his recovery. Billy and Mac are later voted prom king and queen when she beats out Brittany Hodges (Lauren Woodland) for the vote. The two finally admit how much they care for one another, much to Jill's dismay. As Jill threatens to find Amanda to send Mackenzie back home, the two start seeing each other in secret and Billy gives Mac an opal ring as a symbol of their love.

When Billy, Brittany and Raul are chosen to represent Glo by Jabot Kids, Mac helps Phyllis Summers (Michelle Stafford) with running the website. Brittany finds out about Billy and Mac's romance and arranges for Mac to walk in on her and Billy "making love" when she drugs him and fakes it. Billy tries to explain himself to a heartbroken Mac and J.T. reveals that Mac and Billy have been seeing one another and that Brittany set her up. Billy and Brittany reconcile while Raul broke up with Mac for Rianna Miner (Alexis Thorpe). Mac and Billy are drawn together, and with help from his older half-brother, Jack (Peter Bergman), they soon begin dating with Jill's blessing. Afraid that Mac's mother, Amanda, will take Mackenzie back, Katherine petitions and is awarded legal custody of Mac, easing Mac's fears of discovery, and she agrees to join the on-screen Glo by Jabot Kids. Amanda does show up but Mac sends her away, but it is revealed that Amanda has divorced and run away from her husband, Ralph, and living at the same homeless shelter where Mac and her father were volunteers. With Billy's help, Mac and her mother accept each other in their lives again. Billy helps her admit that she ran away from St. Louis because Ralph had molested her and her mother wouldn't believe it. Billy realizes that he is ready for more from his relationship with Mackenzie. When he shares his feelings with her, he tries to avoid pressuring her, but does not accept her insistence that she is not ready. They break up but reconcile as friends.

Mac's stepfather, Ralph, begins stalking her, coercing Amanda into helping him steal from the Chancellor Estate. After Mac unexpectedly catches Ralph in the mansion on her prom night, Billy arrives as Ralph is about to molest Mac again. Billy confronts him and whacks Ralph over the head with a fireplace poker. Thinking he has killed Ralph, Billy takes Mac to hide out in their special place, the old Abbott playhouse. Thinking they are doomed, Billy and Mac realise they still love each other. An alive Ralph tries tracking down Billy and Amanda. Ralph finds at a campsite where Raul and Billy used to play as kids. Ralph knocks out Billy by whacking him over the head with a rock and grabbed Mac, Larry and Ralph fought and both end up going over a cliff. They both survive and Ralph runs away after being scared by the police's arrival. Larry recovers and as Jill has video evidence that Amanda had stolen her jewels, and after Amanda nearly got Mac and Billy killed, Amanda agrees to leave town if Jill drops the charges.

Billy leaves for Louisiana to help Brock build houses for the poor. He and Mac part tearfully, declaring their love and promising each other that it is not the end of them. Mac leaves Genoa City to attend Northwestern University. Both Billy (now Ryan Brown) and Mac returns for Christmas, and decide to attend GCU. Mac and Billy get engaged, but shortly after their wedding, Jill reveals that her birth mother is Katherine. The news devastate them as Mac and Billy realise that they are cousins, and they leave town separately.

Mac returns after spending time in the Southwestern U.S. helping out teaching kindergarten and preschool children on an Indian reservation. Katherine, who has relapsed with her alcoholism, is thrilled to see her, but Mac finds it difficult to live in the same house as Jill, who hates her, and a struggling alcoholic Katherine, so Mac moves back into the loft apartment with J.T., Brittany and Raul. Katherine later becomes sober again. Victor Newman (Eric Braeden) hires Mac as his supervisor on a project. 20-year-old Mac begins to get close with Daniel Romalotti (Michael Graziadei), who has a similar parentless background, but breaks it off when she finds out that Daniel is only 16. Mac begins dating J.T. Mac convinces J.T. that he really loves Brittany, but he isn't able to tell her before Brittany marries Bobby Marsino (John Enos III), so he reverts to his playboy past. Mac is able to get Kevin Fisher (Greg Rikaart) to open up to her and convinces him to go to a psychiatrist. Kevin handles it well when he realizes that Mac is not interested in him as more than a friend.

Mac and J.T. get closer and she loses her virginity to him. In an intricate plot to keep the mob away from Brittany and her unborn baby, they set it up to look like J.T. is the father, with Bobby and Brittany staging a split. For her safety, Mac isn't included in the plot, and this "revelation" breaks her heart. Mac delivers two-month premature baby, Joshua, when Brittany goes into labor. J.T. confesses to Mac it was all a hoax and that he really loves Mac but she is reluctant to trust him again. Katherine convinces J.T., Brittany, and her baby to come live at the Chancellor Estate with Mac for security. They later all move out. Kevin and Mac go into business together, running Crimson Lights. Mac discovered that she is pregnant with J.T.'s baby but cannot bring herself to tell him, telling Kay and Kevin instead. She miscarries and J.T., who is livid that Mac did not tell him but confided in Kevin instead, has a one-night stand with Victoria Newman (Amelia Heinle). Mac and J.T. break up, and Mac begins getting closer with Kevin but returns to the Indian reservation. Mac goes to New Orleans to work with her father and signs a power of attorney turning the coffee house over to Kevin.

=== 2009–10, 2018–19 ===
When Katherine is presumed dead, Mac is unable to attend her funeral as she is ill and living in Darfur, Sudan. After it is revealed that Katherine is alive, Mac shows up at the Chancellor mansion just in time for Billy's marriage to Chloe Mitchell (Elizabeth Hendrickson). Meanwhile, Jill is revealed to not be Katherine's daughter after all, making Billy (now Billy Miller) and Mac not related either. Their reactions to the news makes it obvious that both have never gotten over each other. Mac decides to stay in Genoa City to support Katherine, which makes Chloe concerned for her marriage. Mac visits Kevin when he is committed. Mac is a bridesmaid at Katherine's wedding to Patrick Murphy (Michael Fairman). At the wedding, Billy and Mac dance and share how this wedding reminds them of their own years ago. Mac resists Billy's advances, and when he grabs and kisses her, she slaps him. Mac later tells him that they have both moved on.

Raul returns and reconciles with Mac as a couple, with them having had a year-long relationship that did not work out in Darfur. After Billy reluctantly gives them his blessing, Raul asks Mac to marry him and return to Washington DC with him, which she accepts. Mac begins to doubt their future after spending more time with Billy and later breaks off her engagement to Raul. Billy and Mac get back together, with Mac realizing that he is the man she loves. On the night they attempt to have sex after years apart, they are interrupted by a phone call that Katherine has had another mini-stroke and is in hospital. Cane Ashby (Daniel Goddard) sells Jimmy's Bar to Mackenzie when he decides to leave town. But when Mac heard that Cane's wife Lily Winters (Christel Khalil) is in the hospital with ovarian cancer, and about to undergo surgery, she tracks down Cane and persuades him not to leave town, stashing him in Murphy's trailer home that Billy had bought for them. Mac and Billy finally have sex.

Mac wants to help Lily and Cane by being a surrogate mother for them, but Billy refuses to let her do it, which Billy does not want her to do. They break up and Mac became pregnant with Cane and Lily's twins. Lily's aunt Olivia Winters (Tonya Williams) approaches Lily with an experimental procedure using stem cells from the babies’ placentas that could save her life, but Lily and Mac turn it down, fearing it may harm the babies. Cane decides to sue Mac for the right to take the placenta fluid against their wishes. Mac later gives birth to the twins and Lily survives.

J.T. and Mac reunite as a couple after spending time together and realizing that they have more in common. Mac makes it clear to J.T. that she doesn't approve of constant bashing of Victoria in front of her son with J.T., Reed Hellstrom. Mac and J.T. discover that she is pregnant. Mac reject J.T.'s marriage proposal, but after almost losing him to a tornado incident, she changes her mind and accepts. They get married with Katherine's help and the couple move to Washington, D.C., after Mac receives a job offer there, taking Reed with them. Off-screen, Mackenzie gives birth to a son, Dylan, and they later have a daughter, Becca.

Years later, JT returns to Genoa City and it is revealed that he and Mac are getting divorced and she is suing for full custody of their children. In 2018, Mac returns to Genoa City to attend the Walnut Grove reunion. She get into an argument with J.T. and tries to convince Victoria that she is making a mistake by letting J.T. back into her life. She details how emotionally abusive J.T. was with her and how she managed to get away from him. After J.T. turns up "missing", Mac comes to Victoria wanting answers. Mac attends his funeral, though it is later revealed that he is alive.

== Reception ==
Viewers were reportedly shocked at Bashioum's 2005 exit and against another recast, also citing that Kimsey would have been a better recast for Victoria Newman.
