= Kelly Andrews (The Young and the Restless) =

- The Young and the Restless character
- Cady McClain as Kelly Andrews
- Portrayed by: Cynthia Watros (2013–2014); Cady McClain (2014–2015)
- Duration: 2013–2015
- First appearance: November 15, 2013
- Last appearance: May 22, 2015
- Created by: Shelly Altman and Tracey Thomson
- Introduced by: Jill Farren Phelps
In-universe information
- Other names: Kelly Russell (birth name)
- Occupation: Event planner (2014–15); Teacher
- Parents: Richard Russell; Maureen Russell
- Brothers: Ben Russell
- Husband: Dean Andrews (divorced) (Note: The timeline of Kelly's marriage to Dean is not known as their relationship took place off-screen. They are, however, divorced.)
- Sons: Sam Andrews
- Nephews: Max Kieran

Kelly Andrews is a fictional character on the CBS daytime soap opera The Young and the Restless. The role was originated by actress Cynthia Watros, debuting on November 15, 2013. In 2014, following her booking a pilot on MTV, the role was immediately recast with Daytime Emmy Award winner Cady McClain, who debuted on April 16, 2014. On May 22, 2015, McClain made her final appearance as Kelly, when the character was killed off.

Introduced as a grief support group member in a group attended by Billy Abbott (Billy Miller, David Tom, Burgess Jenkins) and Victoria Newman (Amelia Heinle), she soon becomes involved in an affair with Billy, and reveals a mysterious connection with Stitch Rayburn (Sean Carrigan), who is later revealed to be her brother.

== Casting and creation ==
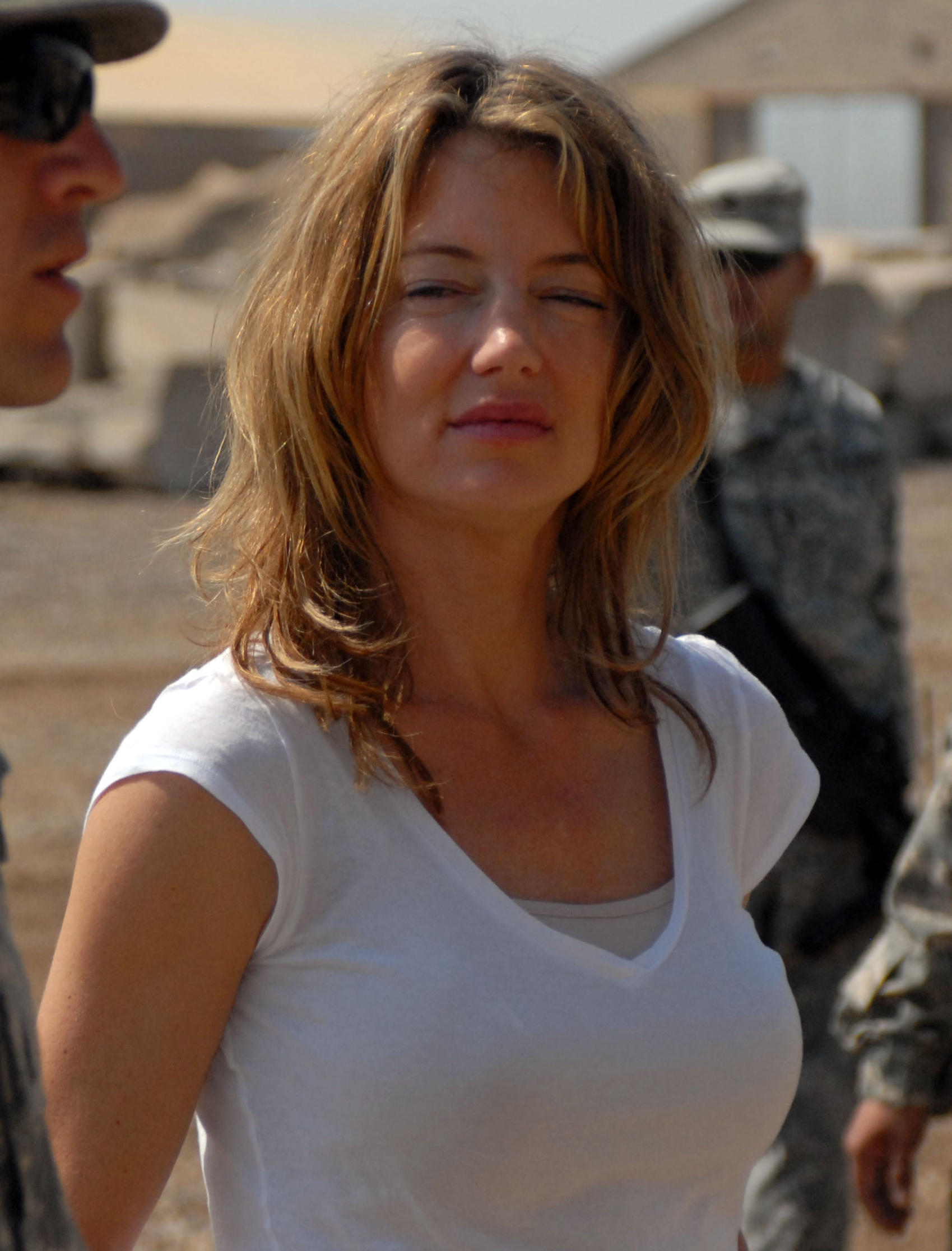
Watros credited her casting in the role to executive producer Jill Farren Phelps, with whom she previously worked on Guiding Light.

In September 2013, Entertainment Weekly broke news that former Guiding Light and Lost actress Cynthia Watros had joined the cast of The Young and the Restless in the recurring role of "Kelly". Watros' arrival was said to have "profound influence" on several of the characters connected to the canvas. Soap Opera Digest confirmed Watros' debut for sometime in November 2013. Entertainment Weekly further confirmed that Kelly was a former school teacher whose son was killed in a hit-and-run car accident, and that she'd interact with Billy Abbott (Billy Miller), whose character recently lost his own child on-screen, and that they would meet in a support group for grieving parents. They further confirmed her first airdate as November 15, 2013. Watros attributed her casting in the role to executive producer Jill Farren Phelps, with whom she previously worked with during her time on Guiding Light. She complimented, "She’s a perfect combination of someone who knows what she’s doing, and she’s a strong woman." Upon accepting the role, Watros knew there was a potential for her to vacate, due to her also being involved in a potential pilot series for MTV.

In January 2014, The Hollywood Reporter confirmed that Watros' pilot Finding Carter had been ordered into a full series by MTV. Immediately following, it was reported a casting call for the role of "Molly" was put out by The Young and the Restless, which a character description that closely described the character of Kelly, causing alarm that Watros may vacate the role. In February 2014, it was confirmed that Watros would depart the series in order to pursue the pilot full-time. In her place, CBS hired former All My Children and As the World Turns actress Cady McClain into the role of Kelly. TV Guide further confirmed that the immediate recasting of the role would likely be due to the potential romantic pairing with Jack Abbott (Peter Bergman). TV Guide further reported that Watros will last tape on March 14, and will last air on April 16, 2014. McClain began shooting on March 26, and made her debut on April 24, 2014. In an interview with On Air, On Soaps with Michael Fairman, McClain spoke on the process of gaining the role of Kelly. She revealed, "I got an email from Y&R casting director, Judy Blye Wilson asking me to send a reel of my work over for the possibility that they may need to recast Cynthia Watros, because it looked like her pilot was going to get picked up. Luckily, Jon Lindstrom had just helped me make a beautiful reel of some of my soap and film work. We sent that over, and then it was quiet for awhile. I know they were looking at a lot of actresses, who of course, wanted to be on Y&R, but I stayed in the running. Then, I sent in another reel of my work from All My Children last year, and I was still in the running (laughs), and then I got the phone call and an offer, and that was pretty much it!" During her first day of work (March 20), McClain worked alongside Bergman, David Tom and Kristoff St. John. McClain further clarified her first airdate to be April 16, 2014, six days earlier than originally reported. In an interview with Michael Logan of TV Guide magazine, McClain spoke on the pressures of replacing Watros, stating, "There's much more pressure being an instant replacement. Boom! Usually when this happens on a soap there's a break of a few months or at least weeks. And Cynthia was mind-bogglingly good and really made her mark with some award-worthy work. So I'm like, 'Oh, s—t!' But I'm bringing my A game and hoping the fans will accept me." Following continued speculation, McClain confirmed her exit in the June 15, 2015 issue of Soap Opera Digest. She made her final appearance on May 22, 2015.

"It’s even faster. You have to make choices really quickly. [...] We used to go in big rehearsal rooms, or we’d participate in big balls and weddings. Everything’s gotten a lot quicker, and there are fewer big events."

— Watros comparing her current return to daytime to that of her work on Guiding Light.

== Development ==
"It’s such a great opportunity. I hope to fit in with the cast and have fun with the fans. I know it’s really hard when the canvas expands or changes. I have some proving of myself to do, and I know that, but I hope I can live up to the fans expectations. All I can say is; I will do my very best."

— McClain's message to the fan of the show following the announcement of her casting as Kelly.

Prior to Kelly's arrival, it was unveiled that she is a recently divorced mother, who also lost her son in a tragic accident. She soon strikes up a close friendship with Billy Abbott (Billy Miller). Her past is later developed when she runs into an old friend, Dr. Ben "Stitch" Rayburn, which whom she continues to taunt a secret from his own past.

With the casting of McClain in the role, she was asked if she'd channel some of the "bitch" from her portrayal of Rosanna during her first-run on As the World Turns. McClain commented, "It’s so much fun to be a “bitch”! At first, it was hard to be so mean. But then I was like, “This is so great.” (Laughs) I have this whole new idea of the character of Kelly in my head. I have this feeling Kelly has this edge to her, but it’s not an edge like a bitch. It’s kind of like raw ambition." McClain also commented on Kelly having "self hate" and being a "complex character", as she tries to put the pieces of the character together for herself.

== Storylines ==
Kelly first appears in Genoa City at a grief support group, telling the story about how her son, Sam, died after being struck by a car, leading it to the end of her marriage to her husband, Dean. She meets Billy (Billy Miller) and Victoria Abbott (Amelia Heinle), who are grieving over the loss of Billy's daughter, Delia Abbott (Sophie Pollono). Billy and Kelly continue to meet and discuss their grief outside of the group, as Billy finds Victoria hard to talk to. Victoria is shown to be jealous of their relationship as she can't give Billy the support he needs. Billy and Kelly later have an affair, leaving them guilt-ridden. Kelly is also revealed to know Stitch Rayburn (Sean Carrigan) and that he is hiding something about who he really is. She is befriended by Lily Winters (Christel Khalil) while working on a fundraising event for a foundation in Delia's name. At the event, she mistakes Billy's brother Jack Abbott (Peter Bergman) for her blind date Lily set her up with; Kelly and the attendees are later held in a hostage situation, which leads to the revelation of Kelly's affair to Billy (David Tom). Kelly is then shunned by a majority of Genoa City after the fundraising event for her involvement with Billy. She meets Jack again, where he offers her money to go somewhere far away from Billy, in which she is deeply insulted and rejects his offer. After resigning from GC Cares, Lily hires her at Jabot Cosmetics. Jack then attempts to rectify his mistake, and takes Kelly out on a dinner date, much to the displeasure of Jack's family, in particularly Billy. As their relationship begins to blossom, Jack and Kelly agree to break things off because of Jack's love for Phyllis Summers, and Phyllis' daughter, Summer Newman (Hunter King); Summer, however, agrees to ease up, which allows the pair to be together. Kelly's connection with Stitch begins to play a part in her relationship with Jack, and when confronted about their closeness, Kelly reveals that she is Stitch's sister, and that she was the cause for his marriage ending to Jenna Kieran (Stephanie Lemelin). In September 2014, Kelly and Stitch's mother, Maureen (Meredith Baxter) arrives in Genoa City, much to their surprise.

== Reception ==
"I had fun, what can I say? It felt soooo good to be acting again. Sometimes acting can be exhausting, but I don’t think that’s going to happen here. I think this is going to be a very fulfilling experience. I am so looking forward to sharing it all with you."

— McClain, in a blog post, about her first day at Y&R.

"In these first scenes, it reminded us of just how great an actress Watros is," Michael Fairman of On Air, On Soaps exclaimed of Cynthia Watros' first episode with the series. For her portrayal of Kelly, Watros received a pre-nomination for the 41st Daytime Emmy Awards in the Daytime Emmy Award for Outstanding Supporting Actress in a Drama Series. Concerning news of Cady McClain's casting in the role, Michael Fairman remarked, "Enter the talented and ever popular, McClain!" Recounting her time with Watros, co-star Amelia Heinle, who portrays Victoria Newman, remarked: "I love Cynthia Watros! She has been doing such a great job. I did not realize how great she is, but she is really good. She is my kind of actress, and she would have been a great cast member to add to the show." She also spoke about the incoming of McClain in the role, stating, "[...] but I know Cady McClain. She’s a great actress too, and a sweetheart! I think we worked briefly together on All My Children."

In the March 31, 2014 issue of Soap Opera Digest, columnist Mara Levinsky applauded and thanked The Young and the Restless for hiring McClain into the role. She remarked, "With only four shows left, casting directors and execs should be turning their eyes to performers like them." She further called the departure of Watros as a "blow" to the series, but that it was "softened" with McClain's arrival into the role.
