= Rachel Kimsey =

American voice actress

- Occupation: Actress
- Years active: 1999–present

Rachel Kimsey is an American actress.

== Career ==
Kimsey portrayed Mackenzie Browning on the soap opera The Young and the Restless (replacing Ashley Bashioum), beginning in March 2005 but she departed after only a year with her last appearance on May 17, 2006. She also portrayed one of Candice Wilmer's many facades in the Heroes episode "Kindred", and had a main voice role as Wonder Woman in Justice League Action.

== Filmography ==
=== Films ===
Year	Title	Role	Source
1999	Fortune Cookie	Doug	
2005	Raw Footage	Pamela	
2008	If It Kills Me	Sadie	
2010	Daylight Fades	Raven	
2011	Just Three Words	Lara	
2012	Apples and Oranges	Debbie	
2023	Justice League: Warworld	Mariah Romanova (voice)	

=== Television ===
Year	Title	Role	Notes	Source
1999	Don't Look Under the Bed	Zoe	Television film (Disney Channel Original Movie)	
2005	Medium	Older Sharona	Episode: "Coming Soon"	
2005–2006	The Young and the Restless	Mackenzie Browning	Main role	
2007	Moonlight	Ilene Spalding	Episode: "Out of the Past"	
2007	Heroes	Michelle	Episode: "Kindred"	
2008	NCIS	Petty Officer Erica Perelli	Episode: "Dog Tags"	
2009	Days of Our Lives	Meredith Hudson	Recurring role	
2012	Consequences	Fight Girl	Episode: "Thorah"	
2013	Masters of Sex	Nessie Lawson	Episode: "Brave New World"	
2015	F'd	Blonde Workboot Girl	Episode: "Strange Days"	
2016–2018	Justice League Action	Wonder Woman, Bleez, Jackie, Sis (voice)	Main cast	
2018–2019	Constantine: City of Demons	Angela (voice)	2 episodes	
2019	Scooby-Doo and Guess Who?	Wonder Woman, Marla, Surley Chef (voice)	2 episodes	
2024–2026	X-Men '97	Ship, Danger, Bella Donna, News Anchor (voice)	8 episodes	
2025	Love, Death & Robots	Margie (voice)	Episode: "The Other Large Thing"	

=== Web ===
Year	Title	Role	Notes
2013	Breaking Belding	Mallgirl Thug	
2013	Failcast	Hospital Director, College Party Girl	
2023	Hullabaloo	Jules	

=== Music video ===
Year	Title	Artist	Role	Notes
2009	Don't Let Her Pull You Down	New Found Glory	Jordan's Girlfriend / Zombie	

=== Video games ===
Year	Title	Role	Notes
2007	Spider-Man 3	Betty Brant	
2013	Call of Duty: Ghosts	Soldier	Uncredited; Downloadable content
2015	The Legend of Heroes: Trails of Cold Steel	Claire Rieveldt	
2015	Call of Duty: Black Ops III	Rachel Kane	
2016	The Legend of Heroes: Trails of Cold Steel II	Claire Rieveldt	
2016	Zero Time Dilemma	Mira	
2019	Days Gone	Additional Voices	
2019	The Legend of Heroes: Trails of Cold Steel III	Claire Rieveldt	
2020	Genshin Impact	Alice	
2020	The Legend of Heroes: Trails of Cold Steel IV	Claire Rieveldt	
2023	The Legend of Heroes: Trails into Reverie	Claire Rieveldt	
2024	Helldivers 2	Eagle Pilot	
