= Vampire Clan =

2002 film by John Webb

- Directed by: John Webb
- Written by: Aaron Pope
- Produced by: Elie Cohn; Keith Walley; John Langley (executive producer)
- Starring: Drew Fuller; Alexandra Breckenridge; Timothy DePriest; Marina Black; Kelly Kruger; Richard Gilliland; Larry Dirk; Mimi Craven; David Wells
- Music by: Guy Harrington
- Release date: July 13, 2002 (U.S.)
- Running time: 87 minutes
- Country: United States
- Language: English

Vampire Clan is a 2002 American drama/horror film directed by John Webb. It received its premiere screening at the 2002 Dances With Films Festival.

== Plot ==
Based on the horrific true story of the 1996 "Vampire Killings" in Murray, Kentucky, the film follows the police investigation of five Goth teenagers who claimed to be real-life vampires. They drank each other's blood and embraced the occult. But they were also ordinary, middle-class kids looking for an outlet for their angst and morbid curiosity. Somewhere along their road trip to New Orleans, their fantasy life became all too real. Now the police have two savagely beaten corpses on their hands—parents of the teenaged vampires. What really happened? And how did these normal kids become such monsters?

== Cast ==
- Drew Fuller as Roderick 'Rod' Justin Farrell
- Alexandra Breckenridge as Charity Lynn Keesee
- Timothy DePriest as Howard Scott Anderson
- Marina Black as Dana Lynn Cooper
- Jennifer Edwards as Jodi Remington
- Kelly Kruger as Heather Ann Wendorf
- Richard Gilliland as Sgt. Ben Odom
- Larry Dirk as Sheriff Mike Dane
- Stacy Hogue as Jeni Wendorf
- Spencer Redford as Jeanine Leclair
- Mimi Craven as Ruth Wendorf
- David Wells as Rick Wendorf

== Reception ==
Critical reception for the film has been mixed. JoBlo.com was also mixed, stating that it "had some decent acting and tunes and at times, slick directing, but on the whole, rubbed me the wrong way from every freaking angle. I just couldn’t find an anchor to the story and I truly, and I mean TRULY, despised the characters in it." Variety panned the film, writing "From its ripped-from-the-headlines topic of teen bloodsuckers to the blandness of a low-budgeter shockingly low on shocks, true story of the murder of a family is translated by scripter Aaron Pope into a woefully standard depiction of wayward youth."
