= Paul Cramer =

- One Life to Live character
- David Tom as Paul Cramer
- Portrayed by: Brock Cuchna (2003–2004); David Tom (2004–2005); Shane McRae (2004)
- Duration: 2003–2005
- First appearance: October 3, 2003
- Last appearance: May 3, 2005
- Created by: Josh Griffith and Michael Malone
- Introduced by: Frank Valentini
- Crossover appearances: All My Children
In-universe information
- Occupation: Pilot
- Family: Cramer
- Parents: Melinda Cramer
- Half-sisters: Kelly Cramer
- Spouse: Babe Carey (2003)
- Grandparents: Lou Cramer; Sonya Roskova
- Aunts and uncles: Dorian Cramer Lord; Addie Cramer
- Nieces and nephews: Kevin Buchanan, Jr. Zane Buchanan
- First cousins: Blair Cramer; Cassie Callison; Adriana Cramer; Langston Wilde (adoptive)

Paul Cramer is a fictional character from the ABC daytime soap opera One Life to Live. Paul was originated on October 3, 2003, by Brock Cuchna, who played the role until March 10, 2004. The character was then recast with David Tom on March 11, 2004. In August 2004, the role was temporarily played by Shane McRae.

Paul crossed over to ABC's All My Children multiple times from December 2003 to October 2004 during a "baby switch" storyline involving both series. The character of Paul was killed off as part of a murder mystery storyline in October 2004, but lingered in newly created flashbacks and other characters' dreams and hallucinations until May 2005.

Tom is the real-life brother of Heather Tom, who played Paul's half-sister Kelly Cramer.

== Storyline ==
=== Beginnings ===
Paul Cramer first appears in Llanview in late 2003 at the re-opening Crossroads, the bar formerly owned by Ben Davidson. In search of Sarah Roberts, the daughter of Tina Lord and Cord Roberts, Paul says he had known Sarah's brother C.J. while serving as a pilot in the Navy and that he had made "the biggest mistake of his life." The nature of this mistake is never revealed as Paul never shares any scenes with Sarah and instead becomes embroiled in a storyline with Dorian Lord and the Cramer family.

A local society maven, Dorian is shocked as Paul arrives on her doorstep and claims to be the son of Dorian's mentally disturbed younger sister Melinda (who had recently confessed to Dorian that she had given birth to another child during her years in Europe) and therefore Kelly's brother. Paul was raised by an upstanding foster family and has only just recently learned of his true heritage. Dorian soon worries that this heretofore unknown Cramer could be the heir to her aging Aunt Betsy's fortune. Aunt Betsy, an eccentric old spinster, has very specific ideas on what a "real Cramer" should be and feels that almost all the women in the family have abdicated their power and self-esteem to men. Dorian and her other niece Blair are desperate to get their hands on Aunt Betsy's inheritance, and the matriarchal family is shocked when man-hating Betsy's favor turns to the dark horse: Paul, the newcomer, who also happens to be a man.

A seemingly agreeable young man with his life in order, Paul is soon targeted for ruin by Dorian and her partner in crime David Vickers. Determined to get Aunt Betsy's inheritance, Dorian and David seek any information they can use against Paul to force him out of Betsy's good graces. They find just that in the discovery of Paul's connection to schemer Babe Carey from Pine Valley, and Paul and Babe's outrageous marriage from the recent past. With Paul out of Betsy's favor, Dorian and David are free and clear to use Carlotta Vega's ward Adriana Colón to gain control of the Cramer wealth once and for all. Paul, meanwhile, begins exhibiting shadier behavior, like working with Dr. William Long, then-Chief of Staff of Llanview Hospital, to sell organs on the black market, and blackmailing Jennifer Rappaport for sex using a tape of Rex Balsom and Jen's mother Lindsay in bed.

=== Crossover to All My Children ===
Paul's December 30, 2003 visit to his estranged secret wife Babe Carey on All My Children ultimately leads to an extensive "baby switch" crossover storyline in 2004. Paul finds himself delivering the babies of both Babe and her friend Bianca Montgomery during a rainstorm in nearby Pine Valley on March 24, 2004. Paul stages a crash with his MEDEVAC helicopter and takes Babe's son for Kelly, who is desperate for a child to save her marriage after miscarrying her own. Paul initially tells Babe that her child had died in the accident; threatened at the scene by the powerful family of the child's father, Paul quickly changes his plan, giving Bianca's daughter to Babe and telling Bianca that her baby had died instead. Unaware of the child's origins, Kelly brings Babe's infant back to Llanview, passing him off as her child with Kevin. Kevin and Kelly name the baby Asa "Ace" Buchanan II after Kevin's grandfather. Babe discovers that "her daughter" is really Bianca's, but remains silent for months and allows Paul to manipulate her and Bianca. Meanwhile, a devastated Kelly discovers that Paul had stolen Ace from his mother; Paul, desperate for cash, blackmails Kelly by threatening to reveal the secret to Kevin and Llanview. Armed with the truth, Kelly realizes they must return the child to his parents; though broken-hearted, they do. Bianca's family resents Babe for the baby switch, seemingly forgetting Paul's role in the incident.

=== Demise ===
After alienating nearly everyone in town, Paul has a mysterious meeting in a cemetery in October 2004; his corpse is later revealed in an open grave, shot to death. In 2005, the killer is revealed to be Daniel Colson. Paul had been blackmailing Daniel, who is secretly gay and carrying on a torrid affair with local college student Mark Solomon. When Paul learned the truth about Daniel's extramarital activities, Daniel eliminated him and attempted to pin the crime on Jennifer Rappaport. During the course of the storyline, Paul appeared to Daniel as a hallucination, warning him that he would be exposed.
