= Kindred (Heroes) =

- Heroes episode
- Episode no.: Season 2 Episode 3
- Directed by: Paul Edwards
- Written by: J. J. Philbin
- Production code: 203
- Original air date: 8 October 2007

Guest appearances
- David Anders as Takezo Kensei; Nicholas D'Agosto as West Rosen; Holt McCallany as Ricky; Eriko as Yaeko; Shalim Ortiz as Alejandro Herrera; Rachel Kimsey as Candice Wilmer; Katie Carr as Caitlin; Dianna Agron as Debbie Marshall; Adair Tishler as Molly Walker; TW Leshner as Derek; Hector Luis Bustamante as Garcia; Nichelle Nichols as Nana Dawson; Stephen Tobolowsky as Bob Bishop; Dominic Keating as Will; Adetokumboh McCormack as Tuko; Mark Colson as Mr. Zern; Tohoru Masumune as Mr. Egami

Episode chronology
| ← Previous "Lizards" | Next → "The Kindness of Strangers" |
- Heroes season 2

"Kindred" is the third episode of the second season of the NBC superhero drama series Heroes. The episode was written by J. J. Philbin and was directed by Paul Edwards. It originally aired on October 8, 2007.

== Plot ==
Sylar awakens on an island beach, disoriented, next to a woman named Michelle. She explains that she is Candice Wilmer in disguise, and that she is creating the illusion of a tropical paradise while he is recovering from surgeries following his injury.

Sylar is dubious, so she dispels the illusion to reveal that they are actually in a small shack in the middle of a forest. While recovering, Sylar discovers that he cannot use any of the abilities he acquired. Michelle explains that his powers will return, with her assistance, but that his wound must heal first.

Peter Petrelli tries to figure out how to control his powers, aiding Ricky and his gang in the theft of a large amount of cash. Ricky's brother Will, however, turns traitor and holds Ricky at gunpoint, demanding the money. He shoots Peter twice when he tries to intervene and continues to demand the money, but is surprised when Peter quickly regenerates and uses telekinesis to hold him against the wall, choking him. Due to Caitlin's pleadings, Peter stops short of killing Will.

Maya and Alejandro are still on the run. It's the next day and the two are in an active search to gain a car to get them to the border. When Alejandro tries to break into a random parked car, he and his sister are caught by the police, and the two make a beeline for the alleyway.

Maya manages to evade the police by getting over the chainlink fence, but her brother isn't so fortunate; he gets arrested and brought down to the station. While at the station, Alejandro sees on a wanted poster that he and his sister are wanted for homicide.

Noah explains to Mohinder he'll protect the latter as long as he's alive. After seeing the subject of the eighth painting, Mohinder takes a snapshot of it with his cellphone and sends it to him, remarking "that's what I'm afraid of."

When the painting is shown, it appears to depict Noah's bloody corpse, complete with a bullet hole through his eye.

In the background, Claire is embracing and kissing a shadowed figure.

Quickly shrinking the image down when Claire comes in the room, he greets her briefly.

After she leaves, the episode ends with Noah still contemplating the ominous painting on his computer screen.

== Production details ==
- This episode marks the first appearance of Niki Sanders, Micah Sanders, and Sylar in the second season.
- As of this episode, Zachary Quinto (Sylar) is now credited as a series regular.

== Critical reception ==
In the 18-49 demographic, "Kindred" earned a 5.1/12 ratings share. This episode was watched by 10.91 million people.

Sean O'Neal of The A.V. Club gave the episode a B.

Robert Canning of IGN scored the episode 5.9 out of 10
