= Clementine Ford =

American actress

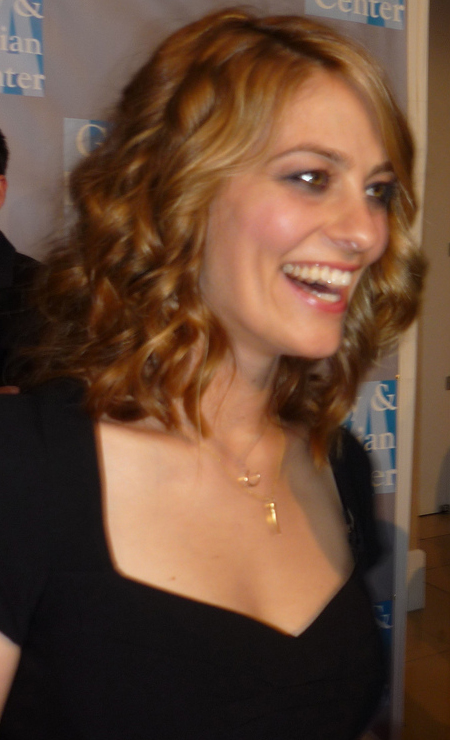
- Ford in 2010
- Other name: Clementine Ford-Wilcox
- Occupation: Actress
- Years active: 1998–2018
- Spouses: Chad Todhunter (m. 2000; div. 2004); Cyrus Wilcox (m. 2013)
- Children: 2
- Parent: Cybill Shepherd (mother)

Clementine Ford is an American actress known for her appearance as Molly Kroll on Showtime's The L Word. In April 2009, she joined the cast of the soap opera The Young and the Restless in the role of Mackenzie Browning. She left the show in 2010.

== Early life and career ==
She is the daughter of actress Cybill Shepherd and nightclub entertainer David Ford. Ford has two half-siblings from her mother's remarriage to chiropractor Bruce Oppenheim.

Ford made her acting debut on her mother's eponymous sitcom in 1998. That same year, she was named Miss Golden Globe and assisted at the 56th Golden Globe Awards ceremony. She made her film debut in a bit role in 1999 in the teen comedy film American Pie. She has since had supporting roles in Bring It On (2000) and Cherry Falls (2000). From 2007 to 2009, she portrayed Molly Kroll (the daughter of Phyllis Kroll, who was played by Shepherd) on the Showtime drama series The L Word. In 2009, she won the role of Mackenzie Browning on the soap opera The Young and the Restless. She left the series in 2010. In June 2011, Ford featured in People magazine for embracing her real body.

In March 2012, it was announced that Ford would star in the stage play Phantoms Go Down. The play was written by Ford's half-sister, Ariel Shepherd-Oppenheim.

== Personal life ==
In 2011, Ford stated that she was a vegan.

According to her mother, Cybill Shepherd, Ford has multiple sclerosis.

=== Relationships and marriages ===
In 2000, Ford married Canadian actor Chad Todhunter. They divorced in 2004.

In March 2009, Ford revealed in an interview with Diva magazine that she is bisexual. In May 2009, Ford told Soap Opera Digest that she was in a relationship with musician and record producer Linda Perry. Their relationship ended in 2011.

In May 2012, Ford announced her engagement to actor Cyrus Wilcox. The couple married in April 2013. She gave birth to the couple's first child in 2014, and to their second child in 2016.

== Stage ==
- Phantoms Go Down (2012) – Rosalind

== Filmography ==
=== Film ===
Year	Title	Role	Notes
1999	American Pie	Computer Girl	
2000	Cherry Falls	Annette Duwald	
2000	Bring It On	New Pope Cheerleader #2	
2004	Last Goodbye	Agnes Shelby	
2010	The Latin & The Gringo	Deb	Short film
2014	Girltrash: All Night Long	Xan	
2016	Skirtchasers	Alicia	Television film
2018	Dear Sister	Caroline	Short film

=== Television ===
Year	Title	Role	Notes
1998	Cybill	Leah Addison	2 episodes
2003	Crossing Jordan	Young Woman	Episode: "Dead Wives' Club"
2004	House	Samantha Campbell	Episode: "Fidelity"
2007–2009	The L Word	Molly Kroll	9 episodes
2009–2010	The Young and the Restless	Mackenzie Browning	63 episodes
