= J. T. Hellstrom =

Fictional character from the American CBS soap opera The Young and the Restless

- The Young and the Restless character
- Portrayed by: Thad Luckinbill
- Duration: 1999–2010; 2017–2019; 2023
- First appearance: August 27, 1999
- Last appearance: May 2, 2023
- Created by: Kay Alden
- Introduced by: William J. Bell and Edward J. Scott (1999); Mal Young (2017); Anthony Morina and Josh Griffith (2019); Josh Griffith (2023)
In-universe information
- Other names: Jeffrey Todd Hellstrom
- Occupation: Forensic accountant; Business executive; Private investigator
- Parents: Tom Hellstrom; Martha Hellstrom
- Wife: Victoria Newman (2008–2010); Mackenzie Browning (2010–2018)
- Sons: Reed Hellstrom; Dylan Hellstrom
- Daughters: Becca Hellstrom
- Aunts: Frieda
- First cousins: Grant

J. T. Hellstrom is a fictional character from The Young and the Restless, an American soap opera on the CBS network. The role was portrayed by actor Thad Luckinbill from August 27, 1999, to November 5, 2010. Luckinbill originally appeared on a recurring basis until he was put on contract in November 2002. On November 3, 2017, it was announced that Luckinbill would reprise the role of J.T., beginning December 12, 2017. Luckinbill exited on April 16, 2018, when the character was presumed dead. In February 2019, it was reported that Luckinbill would once again be returning to the show. He returned during the final moments of the March 19, 2019, episode to reveal he had not died. He later departed on March 28, 2019. In April 2023, it was announced that Luckinbill would reprise the role of J.T. for a special guest appearance on May 2, 2023.

J. T. Hellstrom is introduced as a high school friend of Billy Abbott, Raul Guittierez, Mackenzie Browning, Brittany Hodges and Rianna Miner. He has a reputation as a ladies' man. He is best known for his controversial relationship with Colleen Carlton, as well as his relationships with Mackenzie and Victoria Newman.

== Storylines ==
J. T. Hellstrom first dates Rianna, who he treats poorly and cheats on with Brittany. They break up and Rianna moves on with Raul. J. T. then begins a relationship with Billy's niece, Colleen Carlton. Colleen is heartbroken when J. T. has a one night stand with Brittany's mother, Anita, but they eventually reconcile. When Colleen feels she is getting in the way of J. T.'s budding music career, she leaves Genoa City and a heartbroken J. T.

J. T. develops unrequited feelings for Brittany. After she marries, he begins dating Mackenzie. Though he falls in love with her, he pretends to be the father of Brittany's baby in order to protect Brittany from her husband's enemies. The truth comes out, and he reunites with Mackenzie. Colleen returns to town wanting to reconcile with J. T. He is not interested in her because he is still devoted to Mac. He finds out Mac became pregnant with his baby, yet she did not tell him until she miscarried. He is angry that she confided in Kevin Fisher instead. Angry, he cheats on Mac with Victoria Newman. A broken-hearted Mac leaves town when he tells her. Colleen romantically pursues J. T. and is angry when she finds out he had sex with Victoria, who had recently become Colleen's stepmother. J. T. soon reconciles with Colleen. Their relationship is strained when his work as a private investigator forces him to keep secrets from her. J. T. breaks up with her after she has an affair with Adrian Korbel. He still harbors affection toward Colleen and investigates her disappearance, including breaking into Korbel's apartment where he finds one of Colleen's earrings. J. T. and Korbel save Colleen from a fire, which they falsely believe was started by Kevin Fisher, who previously tried to kill Colleen. They refuse to believe Kevin when he says the fire was started by Jana, his ex-girlfriend, who set him up. Colleen is put on a respirator due to her oxygen level, and J. T. sits with her many times, admitting to her how much he loves her and how he will never stop.

He becomes engaged to Victoria. At the time, Victoria was expecting a baby that may be either J. T.'s child or the child of her estranged husband, and Colleen's father, Brad Carlton. J. T. assures her that the paternity of Victoria's child will make no difference for him and his plans for their life together. When Victoria is hit by a fallen rock during the Clear Springs explosion, she is left comatose. The doctors suggest that they do an emergency C-section to save Victoria, leaving the baby's chances slim. Victor wants to save Victoria and her mother Nikki Newman wants to save the baby. J. T. is left frustrated, as he does not have a say in what happens to his fiancé or "his" son. The decision is made after Victoria's condition takes a turn for the worse, and the baby is delivered via C-section while she is still comatose. A paternity test done when blood is removed for medical tests proved that J. T. is the father of Victoria's son. With Victoria still comatose, J. T. decides that their son needs a name. He names the baby Reed, after Victoria's mother's maiden name, and because a reed is strong and bends with the wind.

Victoria's father, Victor Newman, hires J. T. to investigate Nikki's fiancé David Chow. When J. T. inadvertently tips Nikki off by the way he is questioning her, Victor fires J. T. He has some unease about the strong role Victor plays in the lives of the Newman family, but when Victor offers him a job as head of Newman Enterprises security, J. T. accepts. Victoria wakes up and reunites with J. T. and Reed. He and Victoria are married several days later. Victor then asks J. T. to investigate Colleen in order to take away her seat on the Newman Board. J. T. quits his job at Newman and begins working with Paul. Colleen dies in October 2009 from drowning. J. T. is heartbroken and admits to Colleen that he loves her, which ultimately brings the end to his marriage with Victoria as they decide to divorce. During this time, he relies more and more on the pregnant Mackenzie, his former high school girlfriend for support. He seeks and receives full custody of his son, Reed. He especially does not want Reed to be around his maternal grandfather, Victor. Victoria has vowed to fight and overturn the judge's ruling, with the help of her family. J. T. reunites with Mac, however, J. T.'s current job, spying on Newman Enterprises and gaining information on it for Tucker McCall, puts a strain on their relationship. In September, Mac tells J. T. that she may be pregnant with their second child, the first ending in a miscarriage.

When a powerful storm/tornado hits the Genoa City area, J. T. gets into an accident, as his car hits a tree when he tries to get to Cane Ashby and Lily Winters at the lake retreat. After he regains consciousness, J. T. tries to get moving again but gets electrocuted when a power pole hits his car, causing him to fall back into his car. Mac and Reed are at the Athletic Club waiting for him to return. Lily and Cane discover him on the side of the road when they are returning to Genoa City. Lily goes to call for help, and Cane performs CPR. Earlier in the day, J. T. had proposed to Mac, but she had turned him down. When the tornado was over, while J. T. was hospitalized for electrocution, she realized life's unpredictability. After pleading with him to wake up, she whispers, "I love you," in his ear, and then accepts his proposal. J. T. and Mac move to Washington, D.C., taking Reed with them. In 2011, it's revealed that J. T. and Mackenzie welcomed a son, Dylan Hellstrom. The couple gets well wishes and congratulations from Victoria, Billy and Kevin.

In 2017, J. T. returns to Genoa City to investigate Victor's personal bank accounts, following some "sizable" transfers to off-shore accounts. He finds out that Nikki was stealing money from Victor but does not turn her in. He then reunites with Victoria when it is revealed that he and Mac are divorcing. Mac is suing for full custody of Becca and Dylan in the divorce. J. T. is hired by Victoria as head of security at Newman Enterprises but is also secretly working as a spy for Christine and Paul Williams to dig up incriminating evidence against Victor Newman and Newman Enterprises. He makes a deal that Victoria will be immune from any prosecution if he finds anything.

He starts becoming increasingly abusive towards Victoria emotionally. But it takes a turn when during an argument he violently grabs Victoria by the neck and slams her against the wall. It turns out Victor had been spying on them and he sees what J. T. did to Victoria and finds out J. T. is spying on him. A fight ensues causing J. T. to push Victor down the stairs leaving him unconscious. J. T. leaves and Victor's condition is blamed on Jack. J. T. tries to kill Victor at the hospital by turning off his ventilator, but the problem is resolved by the staff.

Him, Victoria and the kids go on a vacation to Hawaii. He tries convincing Victoria to never go back to Genoa City but she's against it. Things take a turn when Victoria discovers he's been spying on Newman Enterprises. Victoria breaks up with him, leaving him angry. The next night he goes to Victoria's door begging her he'll change but she decides against taking him back. While she tells Nikki, Sharon, and Phyllis about the abuse she endured, J. T. sits at Crimson Lights visibly frustrated Victoria isn't responding to him. Cane notices this and encourages him to not give up. Before leaving J. T. tells him that he may hear some bad things about him and to “believe them or not.”

J. T. sneaks into the house from the upstairs bathroom where Victoria is, appearing behind her startling her, he pleads with her to take him back. Stating he'll get the help she thinks he needs. She refuses to take him back. J. T. gets angry and starts verbally assaulting her while packing his things. He admits to putting Victor in the hospital but says it's justified for what he did to Colleen. She tries to call the police but he stops her and slaps her. Hearing the commotion Nikki, Sharon, and Phyllis make their way upstairs. J. T. is physically assaulting Victoria and yelling at her, the girls come in and Nikki bashes him in the head with a fire poker; J.T. is presumed dead.

J. T. seemingly reappears after his presumed death but was later revealed to be Nicholas Newman wearing a prosthetic mask impersonating J. T. in order to get revenge on Victor and regain custody over Christian by exposing documents regarding Victor's health issues following the attack. In March 2019, Nikki, Victoria, and Sharon were hiding out at the Abbott cabin when they managed to escape their transportation to prison, while Billy and Nick tried to set a trap for J.T. when they grew suspicious that he could possibly be still alive. Much to the women's surprise J.T. showed up to the cabin, revealing himself to be alive. He orders them to tie each other up and holds them at gunpoint as they try to make sense as to how he survived. He tells them that a water pipe had busted in the grave which pushed him into the drain system and he woke up in a river, and grabbed onto a nearby limb for survival. J.T. then starts displaying strange behaviour to the ladies when he appears to be in distress from pain coming from his head. Victoria obviously senses that something is wrong with him and pleads with J.T. to let them all go so she can get him help. J.T. picks up a fire poker and starts smashing things in the room in a fit of rage which busts a gas pipe in the fireplace. A gas leak transpires and J.T. collapses to the floor as Nikki, Victoria and Sharon panic, and eventually pass out while tied up. They are all soon rescued by Victor, Nick, Billy, and Rey, and the women are remanded back into police custody while J.T. is taken to the hospital where it is revealed that he has had a brain tumour pushing against his brain for years. Victoria and the rest of the ladies are released and J.T. apologizes to Victoria for all the pain he had put her through. J.T. is later sent off to prison to do some time.

== J. T. and Colleen ==
J. T.'s relationship with Colleen Carlton is regarded as one of the show's super couples. They were immensely popular despite their controversial age difference. J. T. was most popular when paired with Colleen, the tough yet innately sweet young sophomore.

In August 2009, J. T. and Colleen admit to still having feelings for each other and eventually kiss, leading J. T.'s wife at the time Victoria Newman to sleep with Deacon Sharpe.
