= Kelly Kruger =

Canadian actress

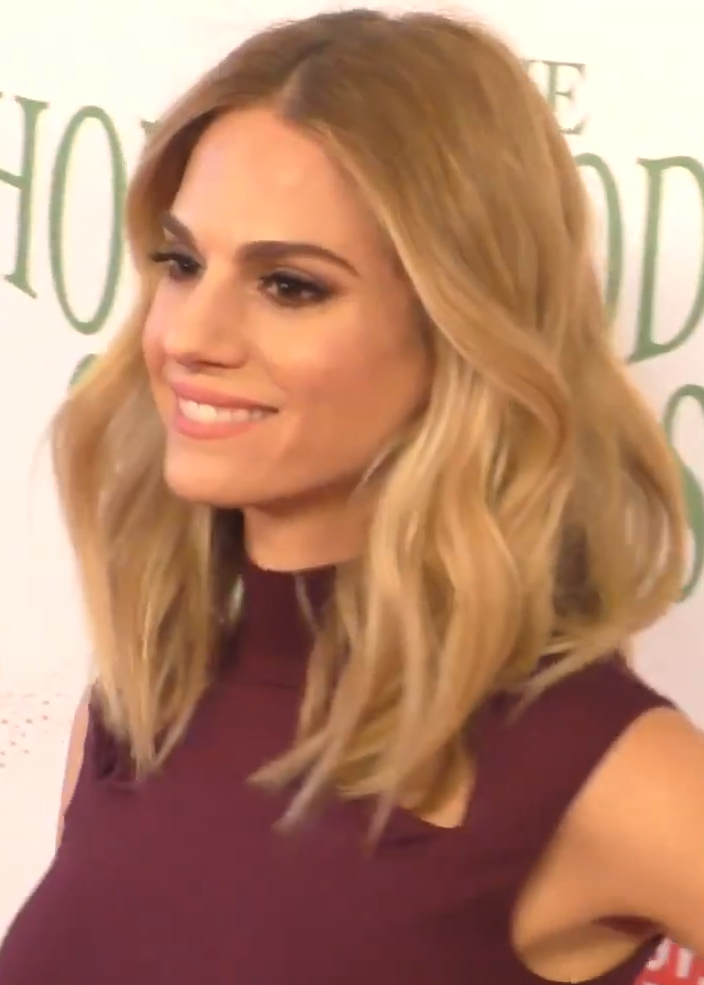
- Kruger in 2016
- Born: November 12, 1982 (age 43); Montreal, Quebec, Canada
- Other name: Kelly Kruger Brooks
- Occupation: Actress
- Years active: 2000–present
- Spouse: Darin Brooks (m. 2016; div. 2026)
- Children: 2

Kelly Kruger (born November 12, 1982) is a Canadian actress. She is best known for playing Mackenzie Browning on The Young and the Restless. She also played the recurring role of Eva on The Bold and the Beautiful and Serena Baldwin on General Hospital.

== Early life ==
She was born and raised in Montreal, Quebec, and speaks French fluently. She was raised Jewish.

== Career ==
At 17, Kelly was discovered by Elite Models while visiting her family in Los Angeles. She worked with multiple teen magazines, Macy’s, Sebastian Hair and others. After working as a model, she began pursuing her real passion of acting. Kelly landed a lead role in the feature film Vampire Clan. Kruger appeared on the CBS daytime soap opera, The Young and the Restless as Mackenzie Browning, from February 2002 to July 2003. Kruger also appeared in several movies, as well as one episode each of the TV series Knight Rider and Blue Mountain State. Kruger has appeared on hit shows such as Entourage, Bones, Criminal Minds, Castle, and Rizzoli & Isles.

In 2014, it was announced that Kruger had joined the cast of The Bold and the Beautiful, as a day player. Kruger made her debut as Eva, in an episode as part of the show's location shoot in Paris, in August 2014. Kelly Kruger continues to recur as Eva. In 2017, she played villainess Joelle in the Lifetime film, Girls Night Out. On March 9, 2018, it was announced by the Soap Opera Digest that Kruger would be returning to The Young and the Restless as Mackenzie.

In June 2026, it was announced Kruger had been cast as Serena Baldwin on General Hospital. Scenes concerning her debut aired on July 30 of the same year.

== Personal life ==
In 2010, Kruger began dating former Days of Our Lives actor Darin Brooks. In February 2014, they partnered with an organization called Aid Still Required. On March 21, 2016, she and Brooks got married. In April 2019, it was announced that she and Brooks are expecting their first child. The couple's first child, Everleigh Jolie, was born on September 22, 2019. In January 2022, their second daughter was born. In March 2026, the couple announced their separation and plans to divorce. Four months later, their divorce was finalized.

== Filmography ==
=== Film ===
Year	Title	Role	Notes
2002	Vampire Clan	Heather Ann Wendorf	
2004	Mysterious Skin	Deborah Lackey	
2005	Self Medicated	Tori	
2008	I Heart Veronica Martin	Virginia	Short film
2008	Infamous	Cowgirl Carrie	Video
2010	Wreckage	Jessica	
2011	1 Out of 7	Tasha	
2013	Nevermind the Dawn	Anne	Short film
2015	Blue Mountain State: The Rise of Thadland	Julia King	Completed
2016	Resurrecting McGinn(s)	Anastasie McGinn	Completed
2016	Broken Strings	Girl	Short film, filming
2017	Girls Night Out	Joelle	TV film
2017	Untitled 3D Horror	Taylor	Announced
2019	From Friend to Fiancé	Kimberley Kentwood	
2019	A Very Corgi Christmas	Lauren	

=== Television ===
Year	Title	Role	Notes
2001	Undressed	Mandy	Regular role
2002–2003, 2018–2019	The Young and the Restless	Mackenzie Browning	Regular role
2006	Criminal Minds	Kelly Seymour	"North Mammon"
2007	Bones	Abigail Sims	"The Girl in the Gator"
2007	Entourage	Lori	"The Young and the Stoned"
2008	Knight Rider	Nikki Childress	"I Wanna Rock and Roll All Knight"
2010	How to Make It in America	Charlie	"Keep on Truck'n"
2011	Prayer Hour	Abby	TV film
2010	Blue Mountain State	Julia King	"Bowl Game"
2011	Blue Mountain State	Julia King	"Riot"
2013	Brodowski & Company	Heather	TV film
2013	Thirtyish	Kelsey Crawford	TV film
2013	Rizzoli & Isles	Jenny Cabot	"Partners in Crime"
2014	Republic of Doyle	Felicity Shepherd	"If the Shoe Fits"
2014	Castle	Laura Westbourne	"Room 147"
2014–2017, 2020–2021	The Bold and the Beautiful	Eva	Recurring role
2019	Home Is Where the Killer Is	Nicole Turner	TV film
2019	From Friend to Fiancé	Kimberly Kentwood	TV film
2026	General Hospital	Serena Baldwin	Recurring role

Preceded by Carly Schroeder	Serena Baldwin (role); 2026–present	Incumbent
