= Ashley Bashioum =

American actress

- Born: December 30, 1983 (age 42)
- Occupation: Retired Actress
- Years active: 1999–2007
- Spouse: Trevor Conner (2013-Present)
- Children: 4

Ashley Bashioum (born December 30, 1983) is a former American actress most notable for her role as Mackenzie Browning in the CBS soap opera series, The Young & The Restless

== Early years ==
The daughter of a plastic surgeon and a former model, Bashioum grew up in Minneapolis with no interest in acting. She became a member of her school's varsity swimming team when she was 13 years old. She began to consider acting when she accompanied her brother to Los Angeles for his auditions. She also auditioned while she was there. Despite receiving no callbacks, her interest in acting grew, and she took classes in that subject after she returned home. She auditioned again in 1999, and a role on The Young and the Restless resulted.

== Career ==
She starred on The Young and the Restless as Mackenzie Browning from 1999 to 2002 and from 2004 to 2005. In 2007, she was in the "B" movie Flight of the Living Dead: Outbreak on a Plane. In 2003, she did an episode of The Shield. She retired from acting in 2013 when she married Trevor Conner.

== Filmography ==
Year	Film	Role	Notes
1999–2002, 2004–2005	The Young and the Restless	Mackenzie Browning	March 18, 1999 – February 19, 2002; April 2, 2004 – March 10, 2005
2003	The Shield	Evette Montano	Episode: "Inferno"
2007	Flight of the Living Dead: Outbreak on a Plane	Jackie	
