= David Tom =

American actor (born 1978)

- Born: Charles David Tom; March 23, 1978 (age 48); Hinsdale, Illinois, U.S.
- Occupation: Actor
- Years active: 1988–present
- Known for: Billy Abbott on The Young and the Restless; Paul Cramer on One Life to Live
- Relatives: Heather Tom (sister); Nicholle Tom (twin sister)

Charles David Tom (born March 23, 1978) is an American actor. He is best known for playing the roles of Billy Abbott on The Young and the Restless (1999 to 2002, 2014) and Paul Cramer on One Life to Live (2004). He won a Daytime Emmy Award for Outstanding Younger Actor in 2000 for his work on The Young and the Restless.

== Early life ==
Tom was born in Hinsdale, Illinois. He is the twin brother of actress Nicholle Tom, who played Maggie Sheffield on The Nanny. He guest-starred with her on an episode of Criminal Minds in 2008. They have one older sibling, Heather Tom, who played Tom's sister on One Life to Live and co-starred with him on The Young and the Restless.

When Tom was eight, his family moved from Chicago, Illinois to Seattle, Washington because of his father's work. A year later, his mother brought all three children to Los Angeles for pilot season. They relocated there permanently, with Tom's father staying behind in Seattle and his parents divorcing. His mother got a job as a speech therapist for the Pasadena school system, while the children pursued acting. Tom studied at the Young Actors Space and worked with acting teacher Diane Hardin.

== Career ==
After appearing in print advertisements and television commercials, Tom made his film debut with an uncredited role in Plain Clothes in 1988. He then landed a regular role as Bart McCray on the NBC series Brand New Life (1989-1990). He made guest starring appearances on Get a Life and Just the Ten of Us. Tom was cast as Sponge in the pilot episode of the Nickelodeon series Salute Your Shorts.

Tom played Andy, a young boy suffering from psychosomatic paralysis, in the 1993 TV Movie Stepfather III. He played Darryl Knable in the film Stay Tuned, co-starring with John Ritter. Tom received Young Artist Award nominations for his roles in both films.

In 1993, Tom played Willi in the historical film Swing Kids, garnering another Young Artist Award nomination. He had recurring roles on Dr. Quinn, Medicine Woman and Quantum Leap. Tom appeared in the TV movies A Place to Be Loved and Summertime Switch.

Tom starred as Jacob McKay, a young boy who gets stranded in the Rocky Mountains, in the 1995 film Walking Thunder. He played a younger version of D.B. Sweeney's character in the comedy-drama film Roommates and guest starred on Sister, Sister.

He appeared as Whitey in the 1998 comedy-drama film Pleasantville, co-starring with Tobey Maguire and Reese Witherspoon. Tom also had a role in the NBC TV mini-series The 60s. He played David Cass in the TV movie Man of Miracles (also known as Holy Joe), co-starring again with John Ritter. In 1999, Tom had recurring roles on Cousin Skeeter and Party of Five.

Tom played the role of Billy Abbott on the CBS soap opera The Young and the Restless, from June 1999 to August 2002, during the same period when his real-life older sister, Heather Tom, was playing the character Victoria Newman on the series, and the characters of Newman and Abbott later married each other in the storyline.

He won a Daytime Emmy Award for Outstanding Younger Actor for his role on The Young and the Restless in 2000. He was nominated again in the same category in 2001. He also won a Soap Opera Digest Award in 2000 for Outstanding Male Newcomer. He received a Soap Opera Digest Award nomination for Outstanding Younger Lead Actor in 2001.

In February 2004, it was announced that he would be joining the cast of One Life to Live as Paul Cramer, replacing Brock Cuchna. His older sister, Heather, played his half-sister, Kelly Cramer. He was involved in a crossover storyline with All My Children, making several appearances on that show. He took a temporary leave of absence from OLTL in July 2004 before a permanent departure was announced in September 2004.

Tom played Jacob Sterling in the 2004 horror film The Hazing. He had a recurring role as Chip Diller on Veronica Mars (2006 to 2007). In 2010, he played Daniel Whittaker in the Hallmark Channel movie Love Begins. He also appeared in the 2013 film Pendejo (Idiot). He had guest starring roles on CSI: Crime Scene Investigation, 90210, Supernatural and Criminal Minds.

It was announced in November 2013 that he would be reprising the role of Billy Abbott on The Young and the Restless, replacing Billy Miller. Four months after his return, he was abruptly fired and replaced with Burgess Jenkins. Tom said he was replaced because he looked too young when paired with his love interest, Cady McClain.

Tom guest-starred in episodes of NCIS: New Orleans and NCIS in 2015. He also played the role of Tobey in the film Chasing Yesterday. In 2019, Tom played Staff Sgt. Kuhn in the film D-Day: Battle of Omaha Beach.

== Filmography ==
=== Film ===
Year	Title	Role	Notes
1988	Plain Clothes		Uncredited
1992	Stay Tuned	Darryl Knable	
1993	Swing Kids	Willi	
1995	Roommates	Michael (age 15)	
1997	Walking Thunder	Jacob McKay	
1998	Pleasantville	Whitey	
2004	The Hazing	Jacob	
2013	Pendejo (Idiot)	George	
2015	Chasing Yesterday	Tobey	
2019	D-Day: Battle of Omaha Beach	Staff Sgt. Kuhn	

=== Television ===
Year	Title	Role	Notes
1989	Just the Ten of Us	Kid	Episode: "A Couple of Swells"
1989–1990	Brand New Life	Bart McCray	Main cast 6 episodes
1990	Get a Life	Otto	Episode: "Dadicus"
1990	Salute Your Shorts	"Sponge" Harris	Episode: "Welcome to Bunk 13" (Pilot)
1993	Stepfather III	Andy Davis	Television film
1993	Quantum Leap	Daniel Burke	2 episodes
1993	Dr. Quinn, Medicine Woman	Lewis Bing	3 episodes
1993	A Place to Be Loved	Brian Russ	Television film
1994	Summertime Switch	Todd	Television film
1995	Sister, Sister	Denny	Episode: "Private School"
1998	Nothing Sacred	Rudy	Episode: "Sex, God and Reality"
1998	Maggie	Billy Dreyer	Episode: "The Other Woman"
1999	Party of Five	Heath	2 episodes
1999	Cousin Skeeter	Joe Steele	2 episodes
1999	The '60s	Tommy	Television mini-series
1999	Holy Joe	David Cass	Television film Also known as: Man of Miracles
1999–2002; 2014	The Young and the Restless	Billy Abbott	Contract role 243 episodes; 57 episodes
2003	Titletown		Unaired pilot
2004–2005	One Life to Live	Paul Cramer	Contract role
2004	All My Children	Paul Cramer	Recurring role 16 episodes
2006–2007	Veronica Mars	Chip Diller	7 episodes
2007	Supernatural	Curtis	Episode: "Tall Tales"
2008	Criminal Minds	Georgie Galen	Episode: "Damaged"
2008	Good Behavior	Cozy Boy	Unaired pilot
2010	Roommates	Brady	6 episodes
2011	CSI: Crime Scene Investigation	Allen Krick	Episode: "73 Seconds"
2011	Love Begins	Daniel Whittaker	Television film
2012	90210	Club Manager	Episode: "Should Old Acquaintance Be Forgot?"
2015	NCIS: New Orleans	Phil Burke	Episode: "Rock-a-Bye-Baby"
2015	NCIS	Maple	Episode: "Lockdown"

== Awards and nominations ==
Year	Award	Category	Title	Result	Ref.
1993	Young Artist Award	Best Young Actor in a Cable Movie	Stepfather III	Nominated	
1993	Young Artist Award	Best Young Actor Co-Starring in a Motion Picture	Stay Tuned	Nominated	
1993	Young Artist Award	Outstanding Youth Ensemble in a Motion Picture (shared with Christian Bale, Robert Sean Leonard, and Frank Whaley)	Swing Kids	Nominated	
2000	Daytime Emmy Award	Outstanding Younger Actor in a Drama Series	The Young and the Restless	Won	
2000	Soap Opera Digest Award	Outstanding Male Newcomer	The Young and the Restless	Won	
2001	Daytime Emmy Award	Outstanding Younger Actor in a Drama Series	The Young and the Restless	Nominated	
2001	Soap Opera Digest Award	Outstanding Younger Lead Actor	The Young and the Restless	Nominated	

First	Billy Abbott (role); 1999–2002; 2014	Succeeded by Ryan Brown
Preceded by Billy Miller	Billy Abbott (role); 1999–2002; 2014	Succeeded by Burgess Jenkins
