= Thad Luckinbill =

American actor (born 1975)

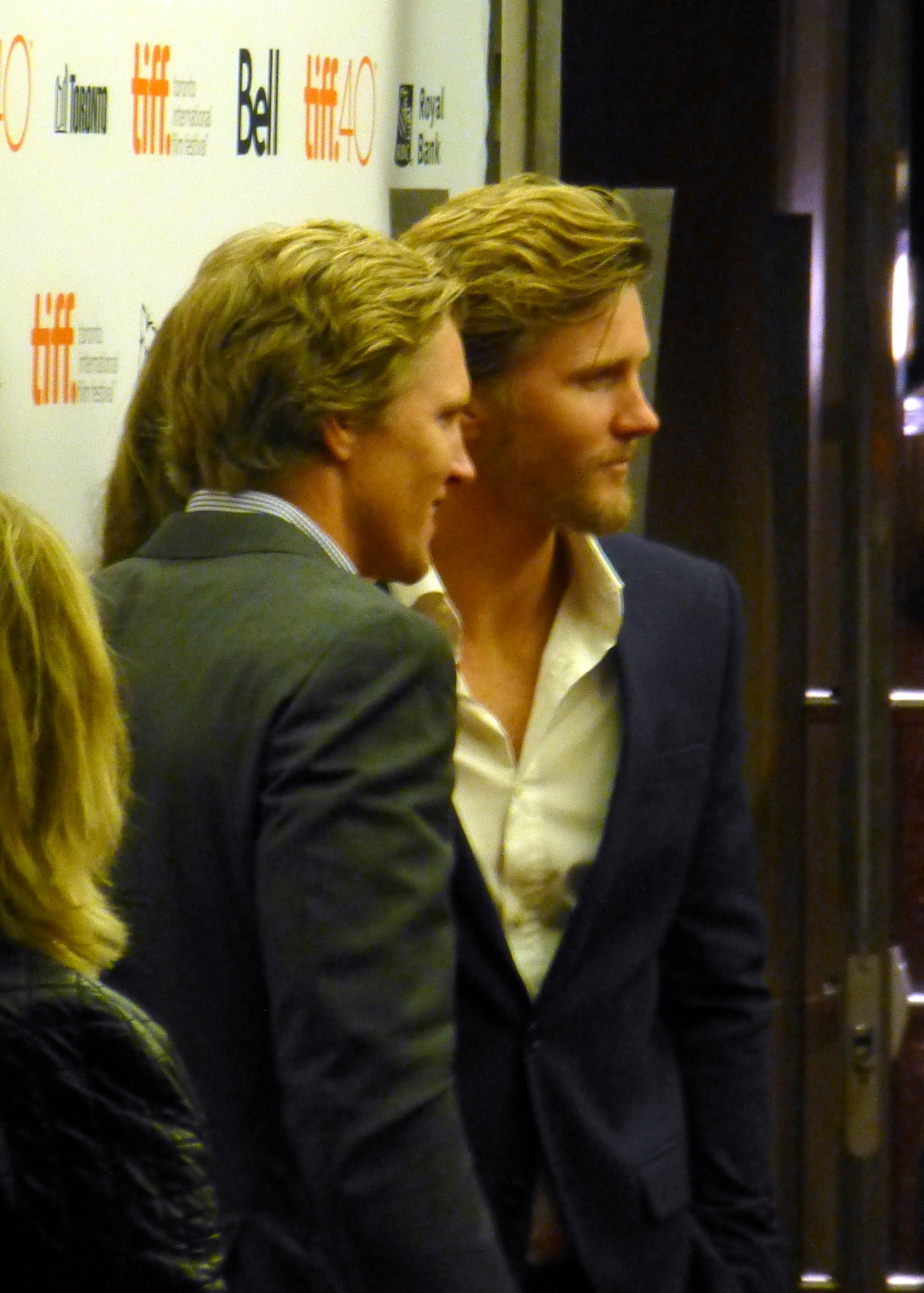
- Luckinbill (right) and his brother Trent in 2015
- Born: Thaddeus Rowe Luckinbill; April 24, 1975 (age 51); Enid, Oklahoma, U.S.
- Occupations: Actor, producer
- Years active: 1999–present
- Spouse: Amelia Heinle (m. 2007)
- Children: 2

Thaddeus Rowe Luckinbill (born April 24, 1975) is an American actor and producer best known for playing J.T. Hellstrom on the CBS soap opera The Young and the Restless, from August 1999 to November 2010. He reprised the role of J.T. from December 2017 to April 2018, again in March 2019, and again in May 2023. Since 2023, he has starred as CIA paramilitary officer Kyle McManus in the Taylor Sheridan spy thriller Lioness.

== Personal life ==
Thad Luckinbill has an identical twin brother, Trent, who is 12 minutes his junior. Trent Luckinbill is a lawyer who lives in Los Angeles. In the final episode of the television series Law & Order: Criminal Intent, "To the Boy in the Blue Knit Cap", Trent briefly appeared as the identical twin murder victim/corpse lying beside the murder victim/corpse of the character played by Thad.

Luckinbill married Young and the Restless co-star Amelia Heinle in March 2007 while their characters were also married on the show. He is stepfather to Heinle's son, August, from her previous marriage to Michael Weatherly. Their first child together, a son, Thaddeus Rowe, was born on November 2, 2007. Their second child, a daughter, Georgia March, was born on December 17, 2009. On March 1, 2017, Luckinbill filed for divorce from Heinle, citing "irreconcilable differences", but as of late 2019, they were not divorced.

Luckinbill enjoys playing volleyball, surfing, boxing, and going to the gym. He occasionally plays for the Hollywood Knights basketball team. He majored in business finance at the University of Oklahoma.

Luckinbill is a cousin to fellow actor Laurence Luckinbill, who was the son-in-law of comedienne Lucille Ball and husband to entertainer Lucie Arnaz, and Luckinbill is more distantly related to film directors Lana and Lilly Wachowski.

== Acting career ==
=== Television ===
In addition to his role as J.T. Hellstrom on The Young and the Restless, Thad Luckinbill has guest-starred on several primetime television shows, including Undressed, Buffy the Vampire Slayer, Providence, Sabrina, the Teenage Witch, Nash Bridges, 8 Simple Rules, Without a Trace, CSI: NY, Nip/Tuck, Ghost Whisperer, CSI: Miami, CSI: Crime Scene Investigation, and Major Crimes. He was a recurring character on The CW show Nikita completing six episodes as Nathan, the neighbor and love interest of Alexandra Udinov (Lyndsy Fonseca), before the show was cancelled after its fourth season. Fonseca was also Luckinbill's former Young and the Restless co-star.

In 2000, Luckinbill was also featured in an episode of the MTV documentary series True Life and appeared in Madonna's "Don't Tell Me" video as the cowboy who was thrown from his horse at the end of the song. On November 3, 2017, it was announced that Luckinbill would reprise his portrayal of J.T. on The Young and the Restless, beginning December 12, 2017. His run ended on April 13, 2018, when J.T. was hit on the back of the head by Nikki Newman with a fireplace poker and presumed dead. In February 2019, Luckinbill was announced to be once again be returning to the show. He returned during the final moments of the March 19, 2019, episode to reveal he had not died. He later departed March 28, 2019. On March 24, 2023, Luckinbill was announced to be reprise the role of J.T. for a one-time special-guest appearance on May 2, 2023.

=== Film ===
In 2023, Thad Luckinbill played the role of home contractor Peter in action thriller Reptile, which he also produced alongside his twin, Trent.

== Producer ==
In 2013, Thad, with Trent and producer Molly Smith (producer of P.S. I Love You and The Blind Side) started a production company called Black Label Media. The production company has worked with A-listers such as Reese Witherspoon, Emily Blunt, and Jake Gyllenhaal, producing films including Sicario starring Blunt, Josh Brolin, and Benicio del Toro, The Good Lie starring Witherspoon, and Demolition starring Gyllenhaal, Naomi Watts, and Chris Cooper.

In 2023, both Thad and Trent Luckinbill produced the film Reptile, teaming up once again with lead actor Benicio del Toro. Thad also plays the character of ‘Peter’, a home contractor, in the movie, alongside Justin Timberlake and Alicia Silverstone.

On October 10, 2023, Reptile earned the number-one spot for English-language films around the world on Netflix with 19.9 million views for the week, that being its second week in a row as the most-viewed English language film globally on Netflix.

== Filmography ==
=== Film ===
Year	Title	Role	Notes
2000	Task Force 2001	Gary	Direct-to-video
2001	Boyz II Men	Faux boy band model	Segment "Crush"
2003	Just Married	Willie McNerney	
2004	Sleepover	Todd	
2005	5 Stages of Grief	Manuel	Short film
2006	The Shadow Effect	Steve Sexly	Short film
2006	Home of the Brave	Soldier #1	
2007	Grampa's Cabin	Older Jake (voice)	Short film
2008	The Essence of Depp	JB	
2014	The Good Lie	Matt	Producer
2015	Breaking a Monster		Documentary; producer
2015	Sicario		Producer
2015	Demolition		Producer
2016	La La Land		Executive producer
2017	Rebel in the Rye		Producer
2017	Only the Brave	Scott Norris	Also producer
2018	12 Strong	Vern Michaels	Also producer
2018	Sicario: Day of the Soldado		Producer
2018	Sierra Burgess Is a Loser		Producer
2021	Broken Diamonds		Producer
2022	Devotion	Peters	Also producer
2022	Whitney Houston: I Wanna Dance with Somebody		Producer
2023	Reptile	Peter	Also producer
2025	Die My Love		Producer
TBA	Copperhead †	TBA	Filming

=== Television ===
Year	Title	Role	Notes
1999	Undressed	Kyle	Recurring role (season 1), 9 episodes
1999–2010, 2017–2019, 2023	The Young and the Restless	J.T. Hellstrom	Role held: August 27, 1999–November 5, 2010; December 12, 2017–April 13, 2018; March 19–28, 2019; May 2, 2023
2001	Sabrina, the Teenage Witch	Sean Hexton	Episode: "Witchright Hall"
2001	Nash Bridges	Young Bobby Bridges	Episode: "Quack Fever"
2002	The Division	Josh Costa	Episode: "A Priori"
2002	Providence	Jack Finch	Episode: "The Whole Truth"
2002	JAG	PO1 Moritz	Episode: "In Thin Air"
2002	Buffy the Vampire Slayer	R.J. Brooks	Episode: "Him"
2003	8 Simple Rules	Donny Doyle	Recurring role (seasons 1–2), 5 episodes
2006	CSI: Crime Scene Investigation	Timothy Johnson	Episode: "Bang-Bang"
2006	Nip/Tuck	Mitchell Skinner	Episode: "Blu Mondae"
2008	Without a Trace	Tim Collier	Episode: "Article 32"
2009	CSI: NY	Connor Dunbrook	Episodes: "The Past, Present and Murder", "Pay Up"
2009	Ghost Whisperer	Grant Harper/Dr. Troy Holdon	Episode: "Stage Fright"
2010	CSI: Miami	Dominic Cross	Episode: "Miami, We Have a Problem"
2010	CSI: Crime Scene Investigation	Michael Wilson	Episode: "Blood Moon"
2011	Nikita	Nathan Colville	Recurring role (season 1), 6 episodes
2011	Law & Order: Criminal Intent	Parker Gaffney/Thomas Gaffney	Episode: "To the Boy in the Blue Knit Cap"
2011	Keeping Up with the Randalls	Will Randall	Television film
2012	Matchmaker Santa	Justin Greene	Television film
2012	Grey's Anatomy	Kevin Banks	Episode: "Moment of Truth"
2013	Rizzoli & Isles	Tucker Franklin	Episode: "Killer in High Heels"
2013	Major Crimes	Hunt Massey	Episode: "Curve Ball"
2015	Criminal Minds	Larry Merrin	Episode: "Mr. Scratch"
2015	Ballers	Stoops	Episode: "Everything Is Everything"
2023–2026	Special Ops: Lioness	Kyle McManus	Recurring role (season 1), Main role (Season 2–3)
