= The Lion in Winter =

Play

The Lion in Winter is a 1966 play by James Goldman, depicting the personal and political conflicts of Henry II of England, his wife Eleanor of Aquitaine, their children and their guests during Christmas 1183. It premiered on Broadway at the Ambassador Theatre on March 3, 1966, starring Robert Preston and Rosemary Harris, who won a Tony Award for her portrayal of Eleanor. It was adapted by Goldman into an Academy Award-winning 1968 film of the same name, starring Peter O'Toole and Katharine Hepburn. The play has been produced numerous times, including Broadway and West End revivals.

== Synopsis ==
Set during Christmas 1183 at Henry II of England's castle in Chinon, Anjou, Angevin Empire, the play opens with the arrival of Henry's wife Eleanor of Aquitaine, whom he has had imprisoned since 1173. The story concerns the gamesmanship between Henry, Eleanor, their three surviving sons Richard, Geoffrey, and John, and their Christmas Court guest, the King of France, Philip II Augustus (French: Philippe Auguste), who was the son of Eleanor's ex-husband, Louis VII of France (by his third wife, Adelaide). Also involved is Philip's half-sister Alais (by Louis VII's second wife Constance), who has been at court since she was betrothed to Richard at age eight, but has since become Henry's mistress.

== Productions ==
The play premiered at the Ambassador Theatre on March 3, 1966, playing for 92 performances and closing on May 21, 1966. Directed by Noel Willman, it starred Robert Preston as Henry, Rosemary Harris as Eleanor, James Rado as Richard, Christopher Walken as Philip, and Suzanne Grossman as Alais. Harris won a Tony Award for Best Performance by a Leading Actress in a Play.

Screen legend Joan Fontaine starred as Eleanor in a 1979 Vienna's English Theatre (VET) production, whose director Cyril Frankel had helmed Fontaine's 1966 vehicle The Witches (which would prove her cinematic swansong). Headlining an otherwise British cast, Fontaine spent a month rehearsing in London prior to the production's October premiere in Vienna for a projected run into the winter with further European engagements TBA, Fontaine hoping the production would afford her a London stage debut. In fact, after her second performance in Vienna, Fontaine would be sidelined by pneumonia: the actress would recall that the production was resultantly canceled although there are indications of further performances with VET regular Mary Martlew stepping into the role of Eleanor. Fontaine had grown enamored of the role of Eleanor to the point of hoping to headline an American tour leading to a Broadway revival: however Fontaine would only be able to headline two regional theatrical productions of the play, firstly at the Fiesta Dinner Playhouse in San Antonio in May/June 1982 followed by a December 1980/January 1981 production at the Beverly Dinner Playhouse in New Orleans, the latter directed by Eric Berry and featuring Andrew Parks as Geoffrey. Nevertheless, in 2008 Fontaine, then aged 91, would advise Vanity Fair that "Eleanor of Aquitaine...was my all-time favorite role".

Veteran screen actor George Peppard (The A-Team) produced and starred in a 1992 production of The Lion in Winter which ran at the Walnut Street Theatre (Philadelphia) from January 11 to February 16; co-starring Susan Clark as Eleanor, the production encored March 24 to April 5 at the Royal Poinciana Playhouse (Palm Beach) and April 7 to April 26 at Parker Playhouse (Fort Lauderdale).

The play made its professional British debut in 1994 with a touring version with David McCallum as Henry and Siân Phillips as Eleanor headlining a cast which included Victor McGuire as Richard, Stephen McGann as Geoffrey, and Christien Anholt as Philip. Subsequent to its January 25 to February 12 premiere engagement at the Churchill Theatre (Bromley), the production played engagements at the Richmond Theatre, affording the play its London area debut with a February 21 to 26 engagement, Darlington Civic Theatre, and New Victoria Theatre (Woking), before wrapping with an April 4 to 9 engagement at Theatre Royal, Bath. The Lion in Winter would not make its West End debut until 2011 when a production directed by Trevor Nunn and headlined by Robert Lindsay as Henry and Joanna Lumley as Eleanor opened at Theatre Royal Haymarket on November 15. Also featuring Tom Bateman as Richard, James Norton as Geoffrey, and Rory Fleck-Byrne as Philip, the production's limited run ended on January 28, 2012.

In 1999 Roundabout Theatre Company returned The Lion in Winter to Broadway for a limited (March 11 to May 30) run at the Olympia Theatre. Starring Laurence Fishburne as Henry and Stockard Channing as Eleanor, the latter earning a Tony nomination, the production was directed by Michael Mayer, and also featured Neal Huff as Geoffrey, Keith Nobbs as John, Roger Howarth as Philip, and Emily Bergl as Alais.

Dee Hoty played Eleanor opposite Randall Duk Kim as Henry at the Cape Playhouse in Dennis, Massachusetts from August 14 to 26, 2000, Hoty stepping in when originally-cast Sharon Gless had a scheduling conflict. Hoty would again play Eleanor in a Two River Theater (Monmouth County NJ) production starring Michael Cumpsty as Henry which ran November 18 to December 4, 2016. The play was produced in 2002 by the Unseam'd Shakespeare Company.

A 2006 production by Theatre West in Hollywood, California, starred Jim Beaver as Henry and Bridget Hanley as Eleanor under the direction of Mark W. Travis.

In 2011 Stephanie Zimbalist and Eric Pierpoint starred as Eleanor and Henry in a Santa Barbara production which ran at the Alcehama Theater December 1 to 18, 2011: co-starring Rick Cosnett as Richard and Daniel David Stewart as John, the production was directed by Jenny Sullivan. The play formed part of the summer and fall 2012 seasons at the American Shakespeare Center's Blackfriars Playhouse, presented in complementary repertory with William Shakespeare's King John. A 2014 production by the Colony Theater Company in Burbank, California starred Mariette Hartley as Eleanor and Ian Buchanan as Henry. Brendan Ford played Richard, and Hartley's daughter Justine as Alais, directed by Stephanie Vlahos.

A 2016 Guthrie Theater (Minneapolis) production starring Laila Robins as Eleanor and Kevyn Morrow as Henry ran from November 19 to December 31. Veteran soap opera stars Robert Newman and Kim Zimmer - supercouple Josh Lewis and Reva Shayne on Guiding Light - played Henry and Eleanor in a 2017 production which ran July 25 to August 6 at the Barn Theatre in Augusta, Michigan. In 2018 Tom Butcher (The Bill) starred as Henry in the English Theatre Frankfurt (August 31 to October 18) production of The Lion in Winter. In 2019 Sheldon Epps directed the Laguna Playhouse (November 10 to 24) production which starred Gregory Harrison as Henry, Frances Fisher as Eleanor, and Burt Grinstead as Richard.

James Goldman’s The Lion in Winter played at Court Theatre, Chicago, Illinois from November 3 to December 3, 2024. John Hoogenakker portrayed King Henry II. Rounding out the talented cast were Rebecca Spence, Kenneth La’Ron Hamilton, Brandon Miller, Shane Kenyon, Netta Walker, and Anthony Baldasare.

== Characters ==
- Henry II, King of England (Male, 50) – Though aging, Henry is still very nearly as vital as he ever was. His manipulations of family and others are portrayed as spontaneous and emotional as opposed to the well-thought-out stratagems of Eleanor, and the cold, calculating machinations of Geoffrey.
- Queen Eleanor (Female, 61) – Eleanor is married to Henry and a beautiful woman of hot temperament, and great authority and presence. She has been a queen for nearly 46 years and is thoroughly capable of holding her own in a man's world. She schemes against Henry and loves him intensely at the same time. She has contempt for her children but is not willing to see them harmed.
- John (Male, 16) – He is the youngest son of Henry and Eleanor. He is sulky and sullen, with a boyish outlook on his position; many in the play describe him as a spoiled brat. He is described in the play as pimply and smelling of compost. He is Henry's favourite, but also the weakest. He vacillates throughout the play, not out of cleverness, but out of fear and weakness. He is easily tricked and manipulated by Geoffrey.
- Geoffrey (Male, 25) – He is a son of Henry and Eleanor, and a man of energy and action. He is attractive, charming and has the strongest intellect of the family; he is also a cold, amoral schemer. His view of himself is of one who yearned greatly for the love of his parents while receiving none. Yet the play leaves open to question whether any of Henry's three sons should be thought to have been truly loved by either Henry or Eleanor, and not merely used by King and Queen as pawns in their ceaseless scheming against one another.
- Richard (Male, 26) – The eldest surviving son of Henry and Eleanor, their second son Henry having recently died. Richard is handsome, graceful and impressive and has been a famous soldier since his middle teens. War is his profession and he is good at it. He is easily the strongest and toughest of the three sons/princes. Richard and Philip II have been sexually involved prior to the action of the play. However, Philip declares that he participated in the affair purely for political purposes, whereas Richard indicates he had genuine affection for Philip.
- Alais Capet (Female, 23) – She is in love with Henry. Everyone underestimates her intellect and power. She is initially portrayed as innocent, but by the end of the play has begun to acquire a ruthless streak of her own, insisting that Henry imprison his three sons for the rest of their lives in the dungeon.
- Philip II, King of France (Male, 18) – He has been King of France for three years. He is not initially as accomplished as Henry in manipulating people, but seems to acquire greater skills at this during the play. He is impressive and handsome without being pretty.

== Historical accuracy ==
The Lion in Winter is fictional, and none of the dialogue and actions is historical. There was not a Christmas Court at Chinon in 1183, but the events leading up to the story are generally accurate. There is no definitive evidence that Alais was Henry's mistress (although Richard later resisted marrying Alais on the basis of that claim). The real Henry had many mistresses (and several illegitimate children). Eleanor had persuaded their sons to rebel against Henry in 1173, and for her role in the rebellion, she was imprisoned by Henry until his death in 1189. While some historians have theorized that Richard was homosexual, historians remain divided on the question.

== Dramatic adaptations ==
=== Films ===
The play was adapted into a 1968 film, with Peter O'Toole as Henry and Katharine Hepburn as Eleanor, and a 2003 television movie with Patrick Stewart and Glenn Close.

=== Pastiches and parodies ===
A radio parody of The Lion in Winter entitled The Leopard in Autumn by Neil Anthony was originally broadcast in BBC Radio 4 in 2001 and 2002 and re-broadcast on BBC Radio 4 Extra in 2011. Broadcast in two series, it starred David Swift as Prince Ludovico, the ambitious and henpecked ruler of Monte Guano (the smallest and most inconsequential city-state in Renaissance Italy), Siân Phillips as his wife Princess Plethora, Graham Crowden as Francesco (Ludovico's perpetually drunken secretary), Saskia Wickham as Countess Rosalie (Ludovico's mistress [with Plethora's full knowledge and approval]), and as Ludovico's perpetually squabbling sons: Nick Romero as the excessively religious Salvatore (whose ambition is to become Pope some day), Paul Bigley as Allesandro (an eternally hopeful would-be artist and inventor) and Christopher Kellen as Guido (a fierce follower of Martin Luther).

The Fox TV drama Empire is explicitly based on The Lion in Winter. It concerns a dysfunctional family that owns a record label named Empire, with all the members scheming and manipulating for power. There are numerous allusions to the play: the family is named Lyon, the father runs an empire while the mother, a very formidable woman, has been imprisoned for many years. Together, they have three sons: a serious, studious, master manipulator son; an intelligent, talented son, who is gay and the mother's favorite but rejected by the father; and a youngest son who is a favorite of the father, but who is spoiled and irresponsible. The recently freed mother schemes with the father and three sons for control of their empire, while at the same time slinging numerous verbal barbs at each other.

== Awards and nominations ==
=== Original Broadway production ===
Year	Award	Category	Nominee	Result
1966	Tony Award	Best Actress in a Play	Rosemary Harris	Won
1966	Tony Award	Best Direction of a Play	Noel Willman	Nominated

=== 1999 Broadway revival ===
Year	Award	Category	Nominee	Result
1999	Tony Award	Best Actress in a Play	Stockard Channing	Nominated

== See also ==
- Middle Ages in film
- Kings of England
