= Soap Opera Digest Award for Outstanding Lead Actress in a Daytime Drama =

Television award category

- Awarded for: Outstanding Performance by a Lead Actress in a Daytime Drama Series
- Country: United States
- Presented by: Soap Opera Digest
- First award: 1984
- Final award: 2005
- Currently held by: Tamara Braun; General Hospital (2005)

The Soap Opera Digest Award for Outstanding Lead Actress in a Daytime Drama is an award held by the daytime television magazine Soap Opera Digest. It was first awarded at the 1st Soap Opera Digest Award ceremony in 1984. It is given to honor an actress who has delivered an outstanding performance in a leading role while working within the soap opera genre industry. The winners are decided by the fans who read the magazine.

Deidre Hall holds the most wins, winning in 1984, 1985 and 1995. Hall is followed by Kim Zimmer who won twice in 1988 and 2000.

== Winners ==
Year	Recipients	Program	Role	Network	Ref
1984	Deidre Hall‡	Days of Our Lives	Marlena Evans	NBC	
1985	Deidre Hall‡	Days of Our Lives	Marlena Evans	NBC	
1986	Patsy Pease‡	Days of Our Lives	Kimberly Brady	NBC	
1988	Kim Zimmer‡	Guiding Light	Reva Shayne	CBS	
1989	Jeanne Cooper‡	The Young and the Restless	Katherine Chancellor	CBS	
1990	Marcy Walker‡	Santa Barbara	Eden Capwell	NBC	
1991	Finola Hughes‡	General Hospital	Anna Devane	ABC	
1992	Anne Heche‡	Another World	Marley Hudson/Vicky Hudson	NBC	
1993	Susan Lucci‡	All My Children	Erica Kane	ABC	
1994	Jess Walton‡	The Young and the Restless	Jill Abbott	CBS	
1995	Deidre Hall‡	Days of Our Lives	Marlena Evans	NBC	
1996	Robin Strasser‡	One Life to Live	Dorian Lord	ABC	
1997	Genie Francis‡	General Hospital	Laura Spencer	ABC	
1998	Vanessa Marcil‡	General Hospital	Brenda Barrett	ABC	
1999	Lynn Herring‡	Port Charles	Lucy Coe	ABC	
2000	Kim Zimmer‡	Guiding Light	Reva Shayne	CBS	
2001	Melody Thomas Scott‡	The Young and the Restless	Nikki Newman	CBS	
2003	Michelle Stafford‡	The Young and the Restless	Phyllis Summers Abbott	CBS	
2005	Tamara Braun‡	General Hospital	Carly Corinthos	ABC	

== Total awards won ==
Wins	Series
4	Days of Our Lives
4	General Hospital
4	The Young and the Restless
2	Guiding Light
1	Santa Barbara
1	Another World
1	All My Children
1	Port Charles
1	One Life to Live

== Multiple wins ==
Wins	Actress
3	Deidre Hall
2	Kim Zimmer
