= Thomas Callaway =

Thomas Callaway may refer to:

- CeeLo Green (born Thomas DeCarlo Callaway, born 1975), American recording artist
- Thomas L. Callaway, American director and cinematographer
- Thomas Callaway (actor and interior designer), American retired actor turned interior designer
