= Reva Shayne =

- Guiding Light character
- Portrayed by: Kim Zimmer
- Duration: 1983–1990, 1995–2009
- First appearance: November 28, 1983
- Last appearance: September 18, 2009
- Created by: Pam Long
- Introduced by: Gail Kobe (1983); Jill Farren Phelps (1995)
In-universe information
- Other names: Princess Catherine Winslow
- Occupation: Volunteer at the Cancer Institute; Executive at Lewis Oil & Construction; Bartender; Telejournalist at WSPR; Host of a talk show on WSPR-TV; Shareholder at Lewis Oil; Nurse's Aide; Photographer
- Parents: Hawk Shayne; Sarah O'Neal Shayne
- Brothers: Russell Shayne
- Sisters: Roxie Shayne
- Half-sisters: Cassie Layne Winslow
- Husband: Billy Lewis (until 1984); H.B. Lewis (1984–1986); Alan Spaulding (1988); Joshua Lewis (1989–1995, 1999–2000, 2002–2007); Richard Winslow (1990); Buzz Cooper (1996); Jeffrey O'Neill (2008–2009)
- Children: Dylan Lewis; Marah Lewis; Shayne Lewis; Jonathan Randall; Colin O'Neill
- Grandchildren: Daisy Lemay; Sarah Randall; Henry Cooper Lewis
- Aunts: June O'Neal
- Other relatives: Tammy Layne Winslow; Roger Joshua Jessup; William Winslow

Reva Shayne is a fictional character from Guiding Light, that was played by four-time Daytime Emmy Award winner Kim Zimmer from November 28, 1983, to July 23, 1990, and then again April 28, 1995, until the show's final episode on September 18, 2009. Zimmer has become such a celebrated performer that she is often considered by some people to be an "icon" in the daytime drama industry.

== Casting and characterization ==
Kim Zimmer is often regarded as one of the most popular performers ever to appear on CBS' Guiding Light and on all of daytime television in history. Zimmer was with the show from 1983-1990 and 1995 until its final episode of 2009, spanning 21 years of storyline for the character. Zimmer's career in daytime soaps outside of her most notable role include Bonnie Harmon on ABC's One Life to Live in 1978, Nola Dancy Aldrich on NBC's The Doctors from 1979-1982 when she took over for her eventual Body Heat co-star Kathleen Turner and Jodie DeWitt Walker on Santa Barbara from 1992-1993. In 1983, Zimmer returned to OLTL as a new character, Echo DiSavoy, but left several months later. She returned in October 2010 after a 27-year absence and remained with the show until the following year. The actress recalled being in conversations to join other soaps when One Life to Live executive producer Frank Valentini asked her to return. Zimmer also appeared in ABC's MacGyver and FOX's Models Inc. and on NBC's Seinfeld in the 1995 episode "The Diplomat's Club". Zimmer's character was celebrated and immortalized in the release of "The Reva Shayne Collection" DVD set by Soap Classics in 2012, which included episodes such as "Reva’s debut on November 28, 1983, the infamous "Slut of Springfield" fountain episode from July 31, 1984, Reva's presumed death in 1990, "Like Mother, Like Son" from November 17, 2004 (Reva and Jonathan's dip in the fountain) and "Reva and Josh 4-Ever", a special episode on the day of Josh and Reva's divorce on April 12, 2006." Zimmer has won the Daytime Emmy Award for Outstanding Lead Actress in a Drama Series four times in 1985, 1987, 1990 and 2006 and has been nominated eleven times in the same category.

Following the end of GL, Zimmer released her autobiography I'm Just Sayin': Three Deaths, Seven Husbands and a Clone! My Life as a Daytime Diva in August 2010. The book followed her career and her own personal struggles over the years. Zimmer believed that the book will make the public see her for who she truly is and said, "When you’re with a character that long, sometimes it makes you wonder, Who am I? The book will correlate Reva to Kim, hopefully with humor." Zimmer has also appeared in numerous stage productions, including Sunset Boulevard, Blood Brothers, Gypsy, The Rainmaker, Love, Loss and What I Wore, Odysseus D.O.A. and Lost Boy Found in Whole Foods, which raised funds for awareness about the genocide in Darfur. Zimmer also participated in ABC Daytime Salutes Broadway Cares in 2010 and appeared with former co-star Robert Newman, who played Josh Lewis in the production of Curtains in 2011. In 2012, Zimmer, along with several other daytime actors, began filming for the movie 23 Blast in Corbin, Kentucky. Zimmer also played Madame Morrible in the First National Tour of the musical Wicked.

== Storylines ==
Reva Shayne has been the focus of various situations throughout her life in and outside of Springfield, Illinois. She has been married nine times to seven different men, has been diagnosed as a manic-depressive, presumed dead various times in which she lost her memory and thought she was an Amish woman and lived the life as a princess, undergone a battle with Dolly, a clone who attempted to overtake her life after her husband allowed a reproduction of his wife after she apparently died and traveled through time. A memorable event that led to her presumed death was when she drove off the Bahia Honda Bridge in the Florida Keys, yelling, "I'm coming, Bud!" in 1990. Some of the more sensible areas of her life has been her career as a business executive and talk show host. Reva's biggest battle was when she was diagnosed with breast cancer and suffered from the ordeal again during her pregnancy with her son Colin although she had since been diagnosed with menopause. Reva's cancer diagnosis sent her through an initial disbelief and hesitancy before treatment. her husband Josh Lewis, was in the dark along with the rest of Springfield until Reva was on her deathbed.

Outside of her adventures and traumatic events that altered the course of her life, Reva has made a name for herself in the game of love. Though she married seven men including Alan Spaulding and Buzz Cooper, her marriages within the Lewis family are most notable. She married H.B. Lewis and his son Billy Lewis II but her greatest love was another man in that family, Joshua Lewis. Their star-crossed relationship lifted them into Supercouple status. Their relationship resulted in the births of two children Shayne Lewis and Marah Lewis. Reva also has three other children including Dylan Lewis with Billy, Jonathan Randall with her ex-husband Richard Winslow and Colin O'Neill with her husband Jeffrey O'Neill, who has since been presumed dead although his current whereabouts are unknown. Reva is also the grandmother of Daisy Lemay through Dylan, Sarah Randall through Jonathan and Henry Lewis through Shayne. Reva closed out the show with Josh and her son Colin as they reunited and drove off to parts unknown in the Ford pickup truck as she said the final word spoken on the show, "Always."

== Reception ==
Kim Zimmer is often called "the most beloved character on the show." One of her most memorable scenes include her jumping into a fountain and baptizing herself the "Slut of Springfield". Zimmer's Reva Shayne and Robert Newman's Josh Lewis are often considered to be one of daytime television's most popular Supercouples. Josh and Reva's story began while they were childhood sweethearts before they reconnected years later and continued their blossoming love story, which weathered her two presumed deaths, three divorces and endless external battles. However, their relationship resulted in two children and countless professions of love. Outside of her emotionally charged pairing with Josh, Reva is known for her acts of selflessness and love. Zimmer compared her character to that of her One Life to Live character of Echo DiSavoy and said, "Echo is devious. Echo doesn’t do anything for anyone but herself. Reva got into a lot of trouble over the years, but it was in the name of love or the defense of someone. She was fighting for her man or children. Echo is selfish."

Regarding her memorable fountain scene, which is often cited as one of the genre's most unforgettable performances, Zimmer recalled filming that day with daytime columnist Michael Fairman.

"All I know is when I finished that scene I did not hear them call “cut” because it was the most I ever lost myself in a scene. Now, I have had a few of those moments since, but not a lot of them. I mean, I was really good if I had emotional scenes, and I used to piss off one of the make-up artists, because they would say, “cut” and I would crack a joke! Or, I would say I just peed in my pants just to get out of it. But that day after that fountain scene I was lost, and then the crew started applauding. And I can tell you that was the first time I ever had applause on a set before. That was rare. Every body was so quiet that you could hear a pin drop."

—Kim Zimmer, Michael Fairman On-Air On-Soaps

Zimmer came in at the second spot on We Love Soaps' list of the "50 Greatest Soap Actresses" in 2010. Her longtime co-star Newman recalled his time working with the actress over the years on Guiding Light.

"Kim is one of the craziest, toughest broads on the planet. This also happens to make her one of the finest actors one could ever hope to work with. She is always honest in her work. Nothing is phoned in. Nothing is manufactured. She is the real deal 24/7. She will fight and argue and scratch and claw in rehearsal, but when that red light goes on, she is 100% committed to whatever the story is at that moment. She is a force to be reckoned with. When you’re on camera with Kim, you’d better bring you’re "A" game. She will. Every time."

In 2024, Charlie Mason from Soaps She Knows placed eighth on his ranked list of Soaps' 40 Most Iconic Characters of All Time, writing, "Kim Zimmer's self-proclaimed “slut of Springfield” was one a kind. That is, unless you count that time that she was cloned. (Don't ask!)"

—Robert Newman, We Love Soaps

== See also ==
- Josh Lewis and Reva Shayne
- Supercouple
