= The Leopard in Autumn =

- Genre: Comedy drama
- Running time: 30 minutes
- Country of origin: United Kingdom
- Language: English
- Home station: BBC Radio 4
- Starring: David Swift; Siân Phillips; Graham Crowden; Saskia Wickham
- Created by: Neil Anthony
- Written by: Neil Anthony, Sue Limb and Roger Danes
- Original release: 4 April 2001 – 12 June 2002
- No. of series: 2
- No. of episodes: 12
- Audio format: Stereophonic sound

The Leopard in Autumn is a BBC comedy-drama radio series by Neil Anthony set in the fictional principality of Monte Guano in Renaissance Italy. Its title was a reference to the 1966 play The Lion in Winter by James Goldman. It ran for twelve episodes between April 2001 and June 2002 on BBC Radio 4 and was repeated on BBC Radio 4 Extra in 2011, 2012 and 2024.

== Synopsis ==
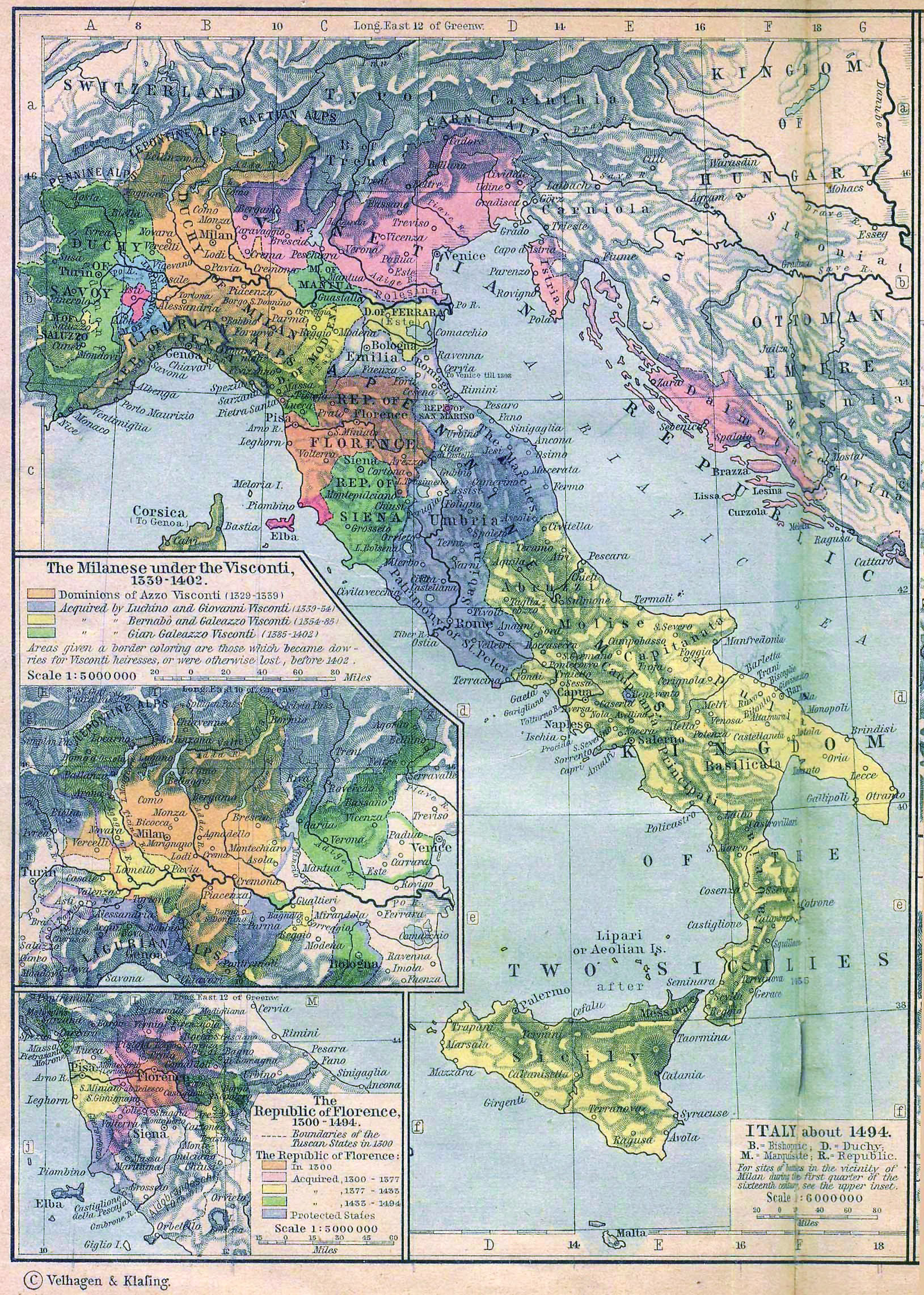
Map of 15th century Italy, showing many of the minor principalities that Monte Guano was based on.

The Leopard in Autumn follows the lives of the ruling family and court of Monte Guano, a small and impoverished Italian principality. Prince Ludovico II ("the Magnificent") is the impious ruler of Monte Guano, but repeatedly finds his political ambitions thwarted, both by the financial demands imposed by the Pope on Monte Guano and by his family. Princess Plethora is a much more intelligent and thoughtful character who is behind many successful ploys to improve Monte Guano's financial clout. She is good friends with Countess Rosalie, Ludovico's "official mistress" who arrived in Monte Guano with the intention of marrying the eldest son of the Prince. Salvatore, the eldest son, wants to go into the church (to become pope) and thus could not marry. Unfortunately for him, his career cannot start because his family do not have enough money to pay to have him ordained priest. His (excessive) private devotion to Catholicism brings him into friction with the youngest brother Guido, a Protestant, and devotee of Martin Luther's works. The middle brother, Allesandro, to the disappointment of his father wishes to be an artist and inventor, and thus requires financial support (and a degree of tolerance) from his father.

Other characters include Francesco, frustrated poet, chronicler and secretary to Ludivico. His constant inebriation and frustrated poetic ambitions are the subject of several jokes.

Throughout the series, Ludivico's speech is characterised by his use of the word "Sneck" as a form of swearing.

Both series are set in the period from 1520 to 1523.

== Cast ==
The Leopard in Autumn starred David Swift as Prince Ludovico, ruler of Monte Guano; Siân Phillips as his wife Princess Plethora; Graham Crowden as Francesco (Ludovico's secretary); Saskia Wickham as Countess Rosalie (Ludovico's mistress) and as Ludovico's perpetually squabbling sons: Nick Romero as the religious Salvatore, Paul Bigley as Allesandro (artist and inventor) and Christopher Kelham as Guido (a staunch Lutheran).

== Episodes ==
=== Series 1 ===
Series	Episode	Title	First broadcast	Description	References
1	1	The Caramba Campaign	4 April 2001	The Prince of Monte Guano is badgered by his wife to wade into war.	
1	2	The Pilgrim Industry	11 April 2001	The ruling family of Renaissance Italy's puniest city-state plot to attract pilgrims.	
1	3	The Coining of the Capricorn	18 April 2001	The ruling family of Italy's puniest city-state aim to introduce a new currency.	
1	4	The Pride and the Peacemaker	25 April 2001	Renaissance Italy's Prince Ludovico buys a cannon, and Princess Plethora wants to confess.	
1	5	The Wild Man of the Woods or The Future Begins Here	2 May 2001	Prince Ludovico battles enemies, as his wife tries reconciling their sons.	
1	6	Plethora Princess Regent	9 May 2001	Awaiting news of a new Pope, Plethora takes over Monte Guano and Ludovico takes to bed.	

=== Series 2 ===
Series	Episode	Title	First broadcast	Description	References
2	1	Considering The Lilies of the Field	8 May 2002	Prince Ludovico must raise the cash for a papal tribute.	Pope Adrian VI features in this episode which was set in January 1522 though his nationality was changed from Dutch to German. Both popes Alexander VI and Leo X are mentioned as fixing the tribute demanded of Monte Guano. Ludivico graphitis a limerick in the 'Lavatorium' - "One would think with all this wit, young Rabelais came here to...", a reference to François Rabelais' Gargantua and Pantagruel in which he suggested using a goose's neck in lieu of toilet paper. Francesco is revealed as a disciple of a "Giovanni Berti" (probably Giovanni Boccaccio) and his book on "Business Management for the Man of Parts". At the end of the episode, the volume is part of a Book burning held by Ludovico.
2	2	An Englishman Abroad	15 May 2002	Renaissance Italy's pettiest state Monte Guano hosts a suspect English lord.	
2	3	Salvatore's Apotheosis	22 May 2002	Plethora decides that son and heir Salvatore must be ordained as a priest.	Salvatore is compared with Girolamo Savonarola.
2	4	The Bonfire of the Sanities	29 May 2002	Plethora plots to get rid of a crowd of peasants, whilst bumping up Monte Guano's coffers.	Title is a parody of Renaissance "Bonfire of the Vanities"
2	5	Confessions	5 June 2002	Salvatore is hell bent on making his family take confession - and cleaning up the cherubs.	
2	6	Royal Wedding Blues	12 June 2002	Countess Rosalie no longer loves Prince Ludovico - can Princess Plethora save the day?	Catherine of Extravaganza (Guido's fiance) is clearly modelled on Catherine of Aragon. Plethora offers Ludivico a glass of "Guano Spumante," a take of the Italian wine "Asti Spumante".

== See also ==
- The Castle, another historical BBC radio comedy.
