= Jeffry Wickham =

English actor (1933–2014)

- Born: 5 August 1933
- Died: 17 June 2014 (aged 80)
- Occupation: Actor

Jeffry Wickham (5 August 1933 – 17 June 2014) was an English stage, film and television actor. He served as President of the actors' trade union Equity from 1992 to 1994 and was the father of the actress Saskia Wickham and Rupert Wickham. His death after a long illness was announced on 18 June 2014.

== Selected filmography ==
- Object Z (1965) - Dr. Baranov
- You Only Live Twice (1967) - Russian Control Room Officer (uncredited)
- Before Winter Comes (1969) - Captain Roots
- Hello-Goodbye (1970) - Dickie
- The Breaking of Bumbo (1970) - Medical Officer
- Waterloo (1970) - Colborne
- Escape to Nowhere (1973)
- Ransom (1974) - Capt. Frank Barnes
- S*P*Y*S (1974) - Seely
- The Sweeney (1975) (Episode: "Faces") - Major Carver
- Thriller (1975) (Episode: "Night is the Time for Killing") - Parker
- Smuga cienia (1976)
- Strangers and Brothers (1984) – Chrystal
- Memed My Hawk (1984) - Captain Faruk
- Another Country (1984) - Arthur
- Plenty (1985) - 1st SOE Man
- Clockwise (1986) - Headmaster #10
- A Man Called Sarge (1990) - Fitzpatrick
- The Remains of the Day (1993) - Viscount Bigge
- The Grotesque (1995) - Justice Congreve
- Marco Polo: Haperek Ha'aharon (1996)
- Ali G Indahouse (2002) - Speaker
- Vera Drake (2004) - Prosecution Barrister
- Brothers of the Head (2005) - Sir Allardyce Stevens
- Space Race (2005) - Nikolai Kuznetsov
- Scoop (2006) - Sid's Co-Passengers
