= Robert Newman (actor) =

American actor

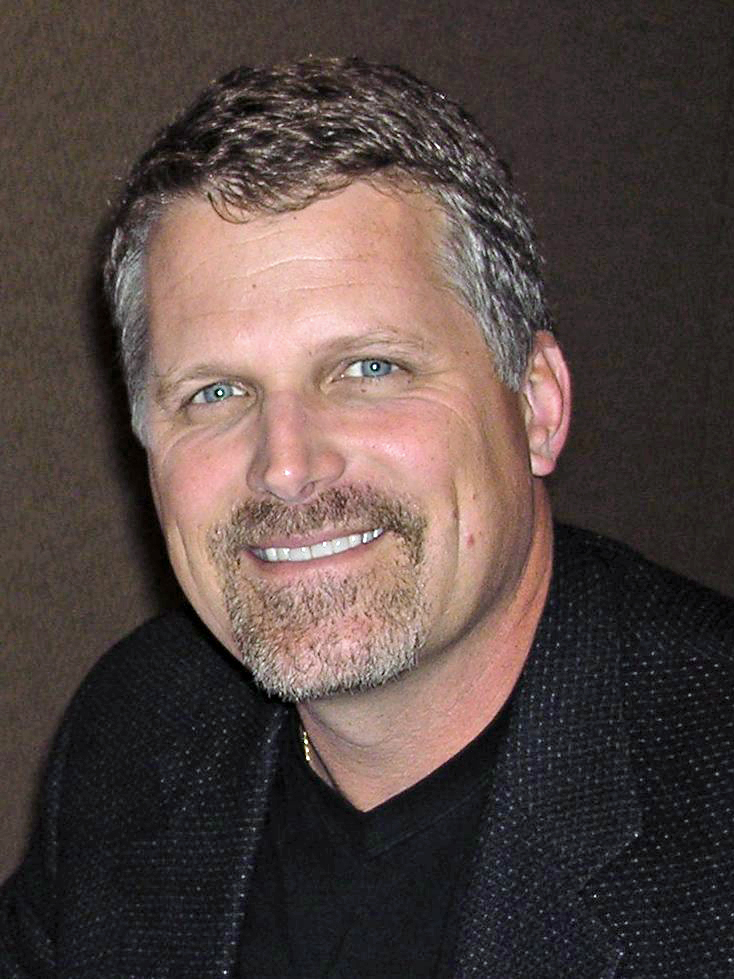
- Newman at New York Fan Fest
- Born: June 27, 1958 (age 67); Los Angeles, California
- Spouse: Britt Helfer (1986–present)
- Children: 2

Robert Newman (born June 27, 1958) is an American television actor.

== Guiding Light ==
Newman is best known for his role as Joshua Lewis on the American soap opera Guiding Light, a role he played from 1981 to 1984, and again from 1986 to 1991, and 1993 to the series finale in September 2009.

The character of Josh was initially introduced as a bad boy of sorts. With the 1983 arrival of Reva Shayne, played by Kim Zimmer, Josh and Reva became a popular "supercouple". Newman and Zimmer's characters became a principal couple on the show. Their characters were reciting the show's final dialogue to one another in the scene's final moments.

During his collective run on the show, Newman was also paired with other actresses, including Michelle Forbes (Sonni), Beth Ehlers (Harley), Marcy Walker (Tangie), Cynthia Watros (Annie), Crystal Chappell (Olivia), and Nicole Forester (Cassie).

== Other daytime roles, accomplishments, and current work ==
In addition to his role on Guiding Light, Newman also played the characters of Prescott Harrell on General Hospital in 1985, and Kirk Cranston, replacing Joseph Bottoms, on Santa Barbara in 1986.

Newman has been nominated for four Soap Opera Digest awards for his role as Josh Lewis. He has also been nominated for three Daytime Emmy Awards in 2002, 2006, and 2023, the first two times in the category of Outstanding Lead Actor in a Drama Series and his most recent nomination was for Outstanding Guest Performance in a Drama Series.

After Guiding Light concluded, Newman focused on stage work, including a production of Peter Pan, in the role of Captain Hook, as Guido Contini in a 2004 production of the musical Nine and in Ira Levin's Death Trap at The Barn Theatre in Augusta, Michigan. Newman has also appeared in several productions of Gypsy as Herbie. In 2011, he played the role opposite Tovah Feldshuh at the Bristol Riverside Theater. He reprised Herbie opposite Guiding Light co-star Kim Zimmer in a 2015 Pittsburgh Civic Light Opera production.

In January 2022, Newman joined the cast of CBS daytime drama The Young and the Restless in the recast role of Ashland Locke, after actor Richard Burgi was terminated from the show.

== See also ==
- Guiding Light
- Josh Lewis and Reva Shayne
- Supercouple
