= Nancy Pinkerton =

American actress

Nancy Pinkerton Peabody
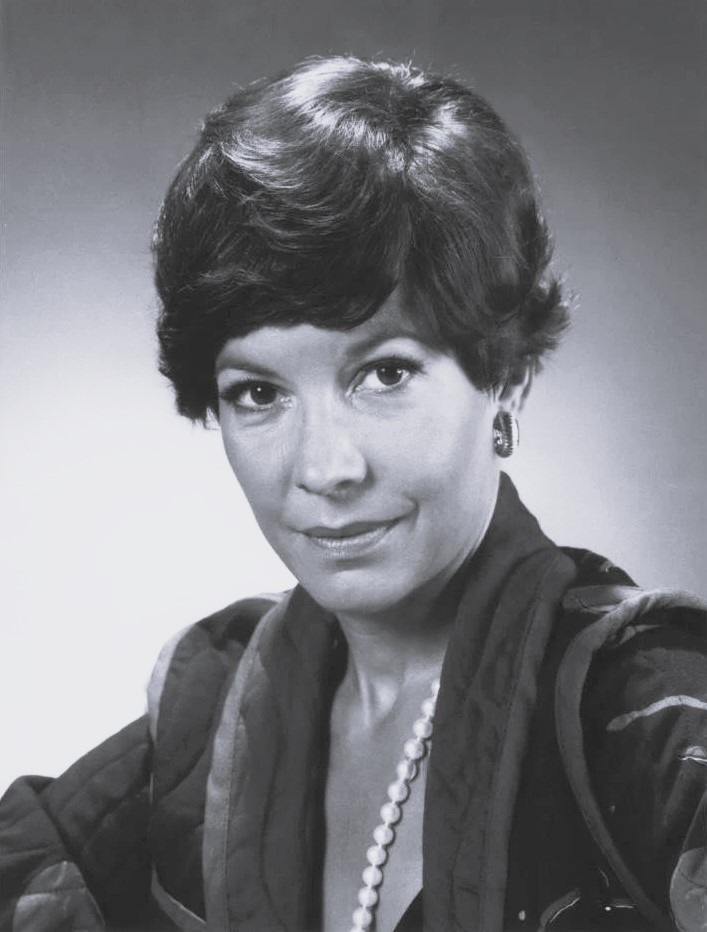
- Pinkerton in The Doctors (1979)
- Born: Nancy Pinkerton; May 7, 1940; Omaha, Nebraska
- Died: March 4, 2010 (aged 69); Westhampton, New York

Nancy Pinkerton Peabody (May 7, 1940 – March 4, 2010) was an American actress.

Pinkerton is perhaps best known as the original actress to play Dr. Dorian Lord on the ABC daytime soap opera One Life to Live from 1973 to 1977, a period which would establish the character as the prime nemesis to the series' long-running heroine, Victoria Lord (portrayed after 1971 by multiple Daytime Emmy-winner Erika Slezak).

Pinkerton had previously appeared on Search for Tomorrow playing Patti Tate briefly in 1961 and then went onto star in The Edge of Night as Beth Moon Anderson Barnes from 1963 to 1967 and as Karen MacMillan on Somerset from 1970 to 1972. After One Life to Live, Pinkerton portrayed Viveca Strand on The Doctors from 1979 to 1981, Dorothy Connors on As the World Turns from 1983 to 1984, and Helen Kennedy on Guiding Light in 1985.

She died March 4, 2010, in Westhampton, New York, of heart failure.
