= The Bride (1973 American film) =

- Theatrical poster
- Directed by: Jean-Marie Pélissié
- Written by: Jean-Marie Pélissié; John Grissmer
- Starring: Robin Strasser; Arthur Roberts; John Beal
- Cinematography: Geoffrey Stephenson
- Edited by: Sam Moore
- Production company: Golden Gate Films
- Distributed by: Unisphere; Bryanston Distributing Company
- Release date: October 26, 1973
- Running time: 85 minutes
- Country: United States
- Language: English

The Bride (also known as The House That Cried Murder or Last House on Massacre Street) is a 1973 American horror film directed by Jean-Marie Pélissié and starring Robin Strasser, Arthur Roberts, and John Beal.

== Plot ==
Barbara, a wealthy 25-year-old socialite, shows her lover, David, the unfinished modernist home she is building for herself in the countryside. The home's construction has been financed by Barbara's wealthy father, who owns an accounting firm where David is an employee. She promises they will soon live there together, despite her father's apprehensions toward David.

Some time later, during the couple's wedding reception at Barbara's familial estate, David sneaks away to have sex with Helen, his former girlfriend. Barbara discovers the two in bed and becomes enraged, attacking David with a pair of scissors. He manages to stop her after she cuts his arm. Barbara proceeds to walk through the reception, covered in blood, and destroys her wedding cake in a rage before fleeing. Barbara disappears, and David goes to meet her father two weeks later, who appears impervious about his daughter's whereabouts or the reason for her fleeing. He tells David that, since childhood, Barbara has possessed a tendency toward cruelty, recounting a story in which she tortured and then butchered her pet chicken.

David continues to carry on his affair with Helen, which is soon discovered by Barbara's father. David receives threatening phone calls from an answering service claiming to be from Barbara. Later, Helen has a nightmare of Barbara trying to kill her, while David dreams of Barbara accosting him in her unfinished home. The next morning, Helen awakens to find a severed chicken head on her pillow, and subsequently discovers its mutilated body in the refrigerator. Upstairs, she discovers a wedding dress hanging on a wall, with a skull mask behind the veil.

Later, David returns home and finds the bloodied bed, but Helen is absent. He receives a phone call from the answering service, claiming to be Barbara, who beckons him to the secluded home she was building. There, he is confronted by Barbara's father, who explains to him that Barbara committed suicide on the wedding day by hanging herself in the house. Her father proceeded to embalm her body, which he has posed in a coffin in the living room, and confesses to terrorizing him and Helen. Barbara's father proceeds to strike David with an axe in the chest.

Some time later, David regains consciousness, and though injured, manages to stand. He finds Barbara still alive, and believes the entire plot was orchestrated by Barbara to get revenge. Barbara demands that David consummate their marriage, but he refuses. Barbara tells David that things will "be much easier once he understands." She then brings him to an open landing to observe the living room below; David looks down, and in horror, sees his own dead body lying next to Barbara's embalmed corpse, still posed in the coffin. David screams in horror, realizing his fate to be trapped in the house with Barbara for all eternity.

== Cast ==
- Robin Strasser as Barbara
- Arthur Roberts as David
- John Beal as Father
- Iva Jean Saraceni as Helen

== Production ==
The film was shot in Connecticut, and released initially by Unisphere, and later by Bryanston Distributing Company, who went on to release the wildly successful The Texas Chain Saw Massacre (1973). The Bride was re-released under various alternate titles, including The House That Cried Murder, No Way Out, and Last House on Massacre Street. Writer John Grissmer went on to write and direct the horror films Scalpel (1977) and Blood Rage (1987), which features a drive-in marquee advertising The House That Cried Murder in its opening scene.

== Release ==
The film premiered in Charlotte, North Carolina on October 26, 1973. It subsequently opened in Boston on November 7, 1973.

== Reception ==
Linda Gross of the Los Angeles Times wrote of the film: "Director Pelisse elicits gloom and good performances from Miss Strasser, Miss Saraceni, Beal and Roberts... The Bride has a lonely, nightmarish quality and the really scary sequences are provided by special effects and Geoffrey Stephenson's creative photography, not from the contrived, hollow narrative."
