= Josh Lewis and Reva Shayne =

Fictional characters of the daytime drama Guiding Light

Josh and Reva played by Robert Newman and Kim Zimmer

Joshua Lewis and Reva Shayne Lewis are fictional characters and one of the signature supercouples from the American CBS daytime drama Guiding Light. Josh is played by Robert Newman and Reva is played by Kim Zimmer. The popular couple has been nicknamed the portmanteau name "Jeva" (for Josh and Reva) on internet message boards.

== See also ==
- List of supercouples
