= Echo DiSavoy =

- One Life to Live character
- Portrayed by: Kim Zimmer
- Duration: 1983, 2010–11
- First appearance: March 15, 1983
- Last appearance: October 14, 2011
- Created by: Henry Slesar
- Introduced by: Joseph Stuart (1983); Frank Valentini (2010)
In-universe information
- Other names: Susan Turner
- Occupation: Photographer; Countess
- Family: French; Stanford
- Parents: Arthur Stanford; Giselle French Stanford
- Brothers: Giles Morgan
- Husband: Maxim DiSavoy (backstory)
- Sons: Rex Balsom
- Grandsons: Shane Morasco
- Aunts: Leda French

Echo DiSavoy is a fictional character on the ABC daytime soap opera One Life to Live. She was portrayed by Kim Zimmer from March to October 1983. After a twenty-seven-year absence, during which Zimmer went on to play the long-running character Reva Shayne on the CBS daytime drama Guiding Light, Zimmer reprised the role on October 1, 2010, staying until October 14 of the following year.

== Storylines ==
=== 1983 ===
Echo and Clint (Clint Ritchie), 1983

In March 1983, Countess Echo DiSavoy arrives in Llanview seeking revenge on newspaper editor Clint Buchanan. She schemes to get close to him and secures a job as a photographer at The Banner. Echo seduces Clint in June 1983, and he is reminded of a woman from his past named Giselle. Though he does not make the connection, Giselle was Echo's mother, and Echo blames him for her death. After telling Clint's wife Viki about the affair, Echo lures Clint into an argument on a bridge. Though she has fallen in love with him, Echo goes through with her plan and jumps into the water in an apparent suicide. Witnessing the argument, Dorian Lord tells the police that Clint had pushed Echo. Clint is indicted for Echo's murder while Viki and Marco Dane search for evidence to clear him. They discover that Echo is alive, and during Clint's trial she confesses the details of her plan to frame him for murder. It is revealed that Echo's father Arthur had actually murdered Giselle. Clint is freed and soon reunited with Viki, who forgives him for his affair. Echo leaves town.

=== 2010–11 ===
Echo returns to town and starts to pay attention to Charlie Banks, Viki's current husband and Echo's old flame. It's revealed that she's the biological mother of Rex Balsom, born as the result of her affair with Clint. Clint, however, wants nothing to do with Rex, and threatens to have him sent to prison if Echo reveals the truth. To protect Rex, Echo claims Charlie is Rex's biological father when confronted by Viki and Rex. A paternity test later confirms this, though Echo realizes that it was changed by Clint. The truth about Rex's paternity is revealed at the double wedding Jessica and Natalie, when Clint's assistant reveals he switched the paternity tests. Charlie falls apart after finding out Rex isn't his son and Echo provides support. Eventually, they start having an affair behind Viki's back. Viki finds out, and demands a divorce from Charlie. Charlie and Echo start to fall in love. Meanwhile, Dorian Lord starts to suspect Echo knows more than she lets on. Echo tells Clint to not let Charlie know that she knew the truth about Rex, which Clint agrees to, but secretly records this conversation. When he later has a heart attack, Dorian refuses to call for help unless he hands over the recording, which he does. Echo finds out about the recording when it's played for her by Niki Smith, Viki's alternate personality. Echo tries to stop Charlie from hearing it, but when Viki returns, Dorian gives her the recording, and Viki gives it to Charlie. Hurt and betrayed, Charlie breaks things off with Echo, and leaves town after officially divorcing Viki. Echo vows revenge on Dorian and Viki for ruining her life.

Echo returns to Llanview trying to ruin Dorian's marriage to David Vickers by making it look like David is cheating on Dorian. She also lets Viki know about Dorian not helping Clint out when he had a heart attack. Dorian realizes Echo set David up, and Echo decides to kidnap Dorian to get her to disappear. However, she is caught by Dorian's great-nephew, Sam Manning, and arrested. Rex blackmails Dorian into dropping the charges, threatening to expose the fact that she almost let Clint die. Echo moves in with Rex and his son, Shane, at the Buchanan Mansion. When Victor Lord, Jr. is murdered, Echo and Rex's adoptive mother, Roxy Balsom, try to protect him by hiding a gun they saw him with, but is later found by Kimberly Andrews. She blackmails Echo into getting Rex to sign over the mansion and Buchanan Enterprises back to Clint. Echo forges Rex's signature on the documents, but Rex later finds out and tells Clint he'd give back the company and mansion to Clint voluntarily. Clint, though, let’s Rex keep the mansion. Echo drops off the canvas, and is revealed later to be on a photography assignment in Mendorra.
