= Robin Strasser =

American actress (born 1945)

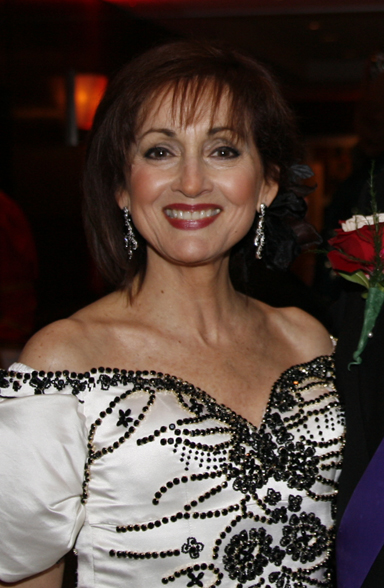
- Strasser in 2008
- Born: Robin Victory in Europe Strasser; May 7, 1945 (age 81); New York City, U.S.
- Education: High School of Performing Arts
- Alma mater: Yale School of Drama
- Occupation: Actress
- Years active: 1964–present
- Known for: Dorian Lord on One Life to Live; Rachel on Another World
- Spouses: Laurence Luckinbill (m. 1965; div. 1976) Richard Hogan (m. 1983; div. 1985)
- Children: 2

Robin Victory in Europe Strasser (born May 7, 1945) is an American actress best known for her roles in several soap operas, especially as Rachel Davis on Another World and Dorian Lord on the ABC daytime soap opera One Life to Live.

== Life and career ==
Strasser's middle name is a tribute to her being born the day Germany surrendered in World War II. She was born in the New York City borough of the Bronx and raised in Manhattan by Martin and Anne Strasser, both Jewish. After graduating from the High School of Performing Arts, on full scholarship, she attended the Yale University School of Drama. She began acting in the early 1960s. Strasser sharpened her acting abilities in theatre, acting on Broadway, where she appeared in The Shadow Box and Chapter Two. Early in her stage career she met her first husband, Laurence Luckinbill; they were married in 1965 and divorced in 1976. They have two sons, Nicholas and Ben. Strasser was also married to Richard Hogan from August 27, 1983, until 1985.

She is a founding member of the American Conservatory Theater, and began her extensive daytime career in 1964. Her first role was as Iris on The Secret Storm. In 1967, she originated the role of Rachel Davis Matthews on NBC's Another World. After leaving the role of Rachel, Strasser played Dr. Christina Karras Martin on All My Children.

Strasser was offered the role of Cathy Craig on One Life to Live, but ended up joining the show as Dorian Lord in 1979, when Claire Malis left the role. Strasser had four stints as Dorian, leaving the show in 1987 and returning to play Dorian again from 1993 to 2000, 2003 to August 25, 2011, and then again in the online revival of the series in 2013. From 2001 to 2002, she appeared as 300-year-old witch Hecuba on the NBC serial Passions. In 2019 she played Vivian Alamain on Days of Our Lives for 15 episodes.

Strasser won a Daytime Emmy Award for Outstanding Actress in a Daytime Drama Series in 1982 for her portrayal of Dorian, and was also nominated for the award in 1981, 1983, and 1985. Strasser has been nominated for Soap Opera Digest Awards for Dorian in various categories in 1986, 1988, 1994, 1995 and 2005, winning in 1996 ("Outstanding Lead Actress" for Dorian) and 2001 ("Outstanding Female Scene Stealer" for Hecuba).

Strasser was an Honorary Chair of the Imperial Court of New York's Annual Charity Coronation Ball, "Night of A Thousand Gowns," on March 21, 2009. She was previously made a Dame of the Imperial Court of New York in March 2007, and attended the 2008 "Night of A Thousand Gowns."

== Filmography ==
Year	Film	Role	Notes
1964–1966	The Secret Storm	Iris Ocasek	Series regular
1967–1972	Another World	Rachel Cory Hutchins	Series regular
1970	Somerset	Rachel Cory Hutchins	Recurring role
1972	The ABC Afternoon Playbreak	Shelley Carr	Episode: "This Child Is Mine"
1973	The Delphi Bureau	Jane	Episode: "The Face That Never Was Project"
1973	And the Bones Came Together	Joyce	TV movie
1973	The Bride	Barbara	
1974	The Wide World of Mystery	Gina	Episode: "Murder Impossible"
1974	The Rookies	Laura Page	Episode: "Legacy of Death"
1974	Paul Sand in Friends and Lovers	Ellen	Episode: "The Groupie"
1976–1979	All My Children	Christina Karras	Series regular
1979–1987, 1993–2000, 2003–2011, 2013	One Life to Live	Dorian Lord	Series regular Daytime Emmy Award for Outstanding Lead Actress in a Drama Series (1982); Soap Opera Digest Award for Outstanding Lead Actress in a Daytime Drama (1996); Nominated - Daytime Emmy Award for Outstanding Lead Actress in a Drama Series (1981, 1983, 1985); Nominated - Soap Opera Digest Award for Outstanding Lead Actress in a Daytime Drama (1988, 1995); Nominated - Soap Opera Digest Award for Outstanding Supporting Actress in a Daytime Drama (1986, 1994)
1988	Highway to Heaven	Kathleen Reynolds	Episode: "Time in a Bottle"
1988	Baby M	Betsy Stern	TV movie
1988	Glitz	Nancy Donovan	TV movie
1988	Annie McGuire	Terry	Episode: "Annie and the Brooklyn Bridge"
1988	Murder, She Wrote	Sylvia Gagliano	Episode: "The Last Flight of the Dixie Damsel"
1989	China Beach	Joan Friedman	Episode: "Women in White"
1989	Murphy Brown	Vladia	Episode: "Moscow on the Potomac"
1990	The Young Riders	Grace Rollins	Episode: "Fall from Grace"
1990	Blind Faith	Felice Richmond	TV movie
1990	Knots Landing	Dianne Kirkwood	Recurring role, 14 episodes
1990	Coach	Elaine Tewksbury	Recurring role, 4 episodes
1990	Dear John	Brooke Collins	Episode: "Matter of Trust: Part 1"
1991	White Hot: The Mysterious Murder of Thelma Todd	Jewel Carmen	TV movie
1991	MacGyver	Queen Morgana	2 episodes
1992	2000 Malibu Road		Episode: "Pilot"
1992	Lady Boss	Abigaile Stolli	TV movie
1992	Civil Wars		Episode: "Devil's Advocate"
1993	Jack's Place	Lucinda Tremayne	Episode: "An Affair to Vaguely Remember"
1993	Bloodlines: Murder in the Family		TV movie
1996	ABC Afterschool Special	Julia	Episode: "Me and My Hormones"
1997	Loose Women	Mrs. Hayes	
1999	Picture This		
2000	Grosse Pointe	Lila Van Guilden	Episode: "Mommy Dearest"
2001–2002	Dharma & Greg	Teensy Manhart	2 episodes
2002	Shoot or Be Shot	Mrs. Steinman	
2000–2003	Passions	Hecuba	Recurring role Soap Opera Digest Award for Outstanding Female Scene Stealer (2001)
2003, 2005	All My Children	Dorian Lord	Guest appearances
2019	Days of Our Lives	Vivian Alamain	15 episodes
