= Claire Malis =

American actress (1943–2012)

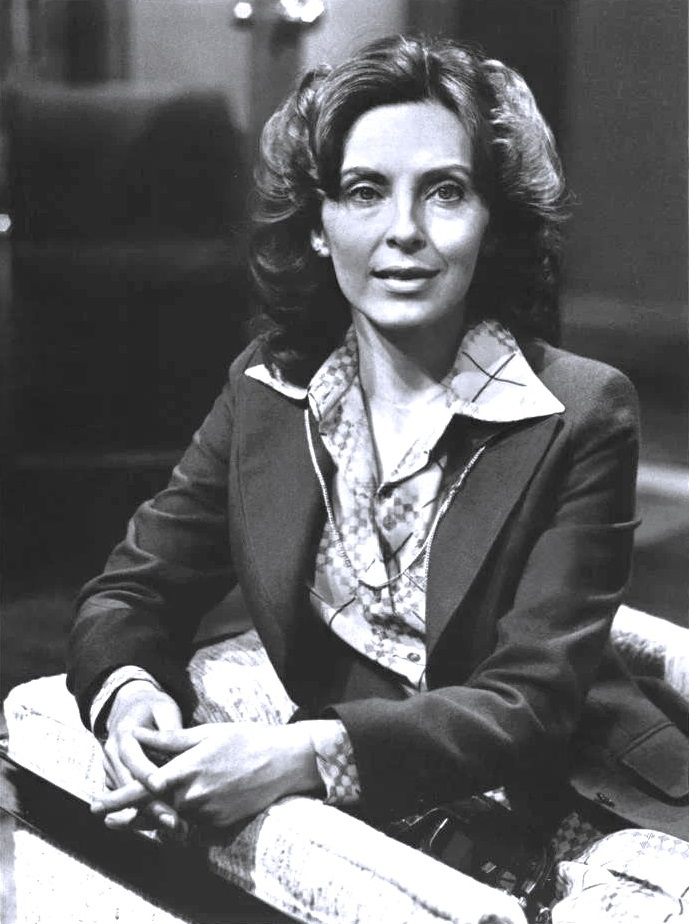
- Malis in One Life to Live (1977)
- Born: February 17, 1943; Gary, Indiana, U.S.
- Died: August 24, 2012 (aged 69); Duarte, California, U.S.
- Other name: Claire Malis Callaway
- Occupation: Actress
- Spouse(s): Thomas Callaway; (her death) 1 child

Claire Malis (February 17, 1943 – August 24, 2012) was an American actress. In later years she was often credited as Claire Malis Callaway.

Malis was perhaps best known as the second actress to play Dr. Dorian Lord on the ABC daytime soap opera One Life to Live from 1977 to 1979. She appeared in the 1980 television series From Here to Eternity as Dr. Anne Brewster. The 13-episode series continued the story of the 1979 miniseries of the same name. Malis went on to guest star on numerous drama and comedy TV series and multiple films. Between 1983 and 1988 Malis portrayed Rose Polniaczek, mother of series regular Jo, in six episodes of the NBC sitcom The Facts of Life.

== Death ==
Malis suffered from non-Hodgkin lymphoma but recovered through a stem cell transplant administered at City of Hope Helford Clinical Research Hospital in Duarte, California, in 2010. She died of congestive heart failure and pneumonia on August 24, 2012, at City of Hope. She was 69. She is survived by her husband, architectural and interior designer Thomas Callaway; their son Catlin; and her brother Lee.
