= Dorian Lord =

- One Life to Live character
- Robin Strasser as Dorian Lord
- Portrayed by: Nancy Pinkerton (1973–1977); Dixie Carter (1974); Claire Malis (1977–1979); Robin Strasser (1979–1987, 1993–2000, 2003-2011, 2013); Elaine Princi (1990–1993)
- Duration: 1973–1987; 1990–2000; 2003–2011; 2013
- First appearance: April 19, 1973
- Last appearance: August 19, 2013
- Created by: Agnes Nixon; Gordon Russell
- Introduced by: Doris Quinlan; Paul Rauch (1990); Frank Valentini (2003); Jennifer Pepperman (2013)
- Crossover appearances: All My Children
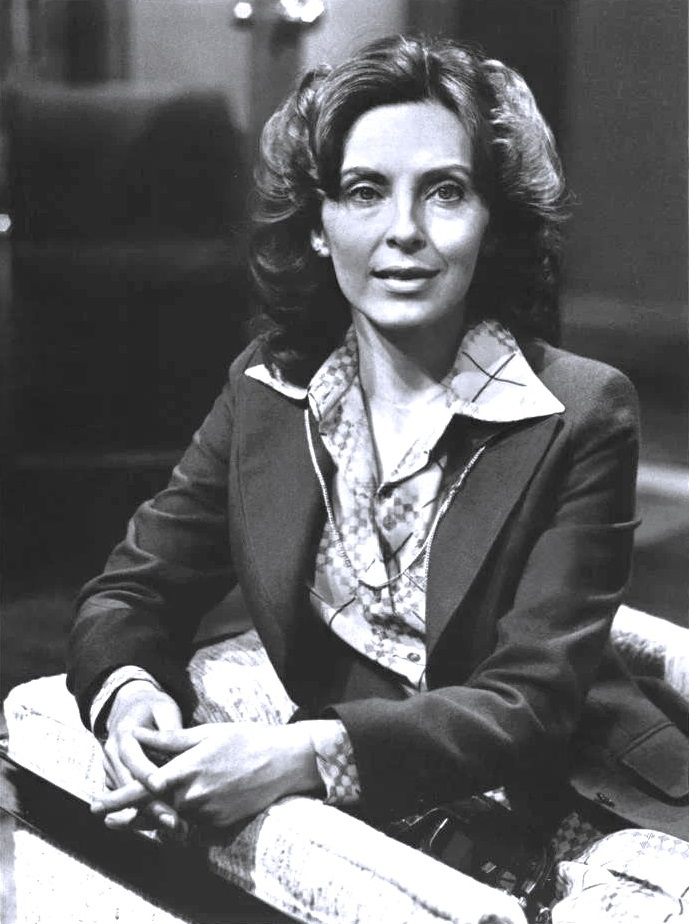
- Claire Malis as Dorian Lord

- Elaine Princi as Dorian Lord
In-universe information
- Other names: Dorian Cramer (maiden name); Claudia Carson; Blair Daimler; Lindsay; Dorian Lord Vickers Buchanan
- Occupation: Physician; Businesswoman; Politician; Executor and trustee to the Lord family estate
- Family: Cramer
- Parents: Lou Cramer; Sonya Roskova
- Sisters: Addie Cramer; Melinda Cramer
- Husband: Victor Lord (1975–1983); Herb Callison (1981–1985); Manuel Santi (1987–89); David Vickers Buchanan (1995–1996, 2009, 2011–Present); Mel Hayes (1998–1999); Mitch Laurence (2003)
- Wife: Amelia Bennett (2009)
- Daughters: Cassie Callison; Adriana Cramer
- Adoptive daughters: Langston Wilde
- Grandsons: River Carpenter
- Aunts: Betsy Cramer
- Nephews: Paul Cramer
- Nieces: Blair Cramer; Kelly Cramer

Dorian Lord is a fictional character and matriarch of the Cramer family on the American daytime drama One Life to Live, played most notably and for the longest duration by actress Robin Strasser. Strasser was cast by series creator Agnes Nixon and debuted on the episode first-aired on April 13, 1979. For most of the show's history, the character is the show's primary antagonist and Byronic hero.

Strasser won the Daytime Emmy Award for Outstanding Lead Actress in a Daytime Drama Series in 1982 for her portrayal of Dorian, and was also nominated for the award in 1981, 1983, and 1985. Strasser has been nominated for Soap Opera Digest Awards for Dorian in various categories in 1986, 1988, 1994, 1995, and 2005, winning in 1996 as "Outstanding Lead Actress." Princi was also nominated for a Soap Opera Digest Award as Dorian for "Outstanding Villainess: Daytime" in 1992.

== Character background ==
=== Casting ===
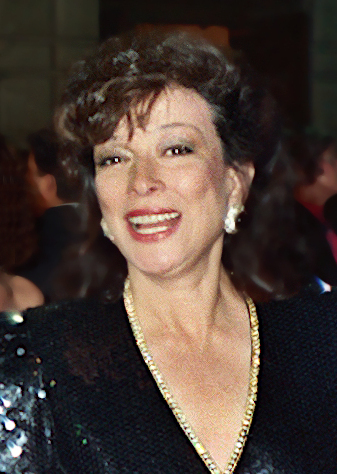
Dixie Carter filled in for Pinkerton briefly in 1974.

The character of Dorian Cramer was originated by Nancy Pinkerton on April 19, 1973 and was subsequently played by Claire Malis from May 1977 to April 12, 1979. Robin Strasser was hired to play Dorian by her former Another World boss Agnes Nixon — who originally hired her to play Erica Kane prototype Rachel Davis on Another World, and previously offered a 1975 recast role as Cathy Craig. Strasser debuted as Dorian on April 13, 1979, and played the role until her departure in 1987. Elaine Princi portrayed Dorian from January 12, 1990 to January 18, 1993, and appeared in episodes of All My Children when Dorian and Adam Chandler conspired against Natalie Marlowe. Strasser returned to the role in December 1992, making her first onscreen appearance on February 19, 1993. She continued in the role until February 23, 2000. After an absence of several years, she reprised the role from April 1, 2003, until August 25, 2011, shortly before the end of the show's run. Strasser also appeared for several episodes on All My Children in 2003 and 2005. Princi and Strasser had earlier appeared on All My Children in other parts before their cross-over. Strasser returned as a regular to the series when new daily episodes of debuted on Hulu, iTunes, and FX Canada via The Online Network April 29, 2013. In 1974, actress Dixie Carter filled in for Pinkerton, who was out on maternity leave.

=== Characterization ===
The role of Dorian was originally created by One Life creator Agnes Nixon and protégé Gordon Russell as the central and primary antagonizing foil to series heroine Victoria "Viki" Lord. Jealous of Viki's wealth and prestige in Llanview, the newly arrived town doctor in 1973 soon becomes the town outcast for several decades after she is oft-suspected of negligent complicity in the apparent death her then-husband, Viki's father, and respected Llanview media mogul Victor Lord in 1976. Despite many truces, Dorian and Viki are considered frenemies, occasionally putting aside their animosity to work toward a shared goal, such as in their personal vendettas against the mistress of two of Viki's husbands, Echo DiSavoy.

Despite her conniving and vindictive nature, she often displays tender and genuine compassion toward family and loved ones. Dorian has claustrophobia, which is explained to be the result of her mother Sonya's child abuse (actress Strasser stated that this character trait was added to mirror her actual illness).

Dorian has a long list of people who she has scorned and fought over the years, ranging from the aforementioned Viki, to other members of the Lord, Buchanan, and Wolek families.

== Storylines ==
=== 1973–1987 ===
A newly minted physician, Dorian Cramer (Pinkerton) arrives in fictional Llanview, Pennsylvania on the episode first-run April 30, 1973, along with her mentally ill sister, Melinda (Patricia Pearcy). Dorian takes a physician position at Llanview Hospital, where she quickly engages in a romantic affair with her married colleague, Dr. Mark Toland (Tommy Lee Jones). Melinda, in the meantime, wants Mark for herself. Upon learning of their affair, she schemes to drive them apart. After attacking Mark with a butcher's knife, Melinda is sent to a mental institution in 1974.

Nancy Pinkerton originated the role of Dorian Cramer in 1973.

Dorian and Mark continue their affair. During an intense exchange between the two, Dorian makes a careless error on a medical chart, resulting in the accidental death of terminally-ill patient Rachel Wilson Farmer (Nancy Barrett). Fearing for their careers, the two covered up the crime; extenuating circumstance, meanwhile, lead Dr. Larry Wolek (Michael Storm) to be arrested instead. With the guilt on her shoulders, Dorian later wants to confess, while Mark is content with allowing Larry to take the fall. As they argued over how to handle the situation, Dorian accidentally falls down a flight of stairs and goes into a coma. Upon waking, Dorian confesses and is immediately fired by the hospital board. An angered Dorian, burgeoning medical career dashed, blames Victoria "Viki" Lord Riley (Erika Slezak), a prominent hospital board member, for her termination. This begins a rivalry that would last for decades. What Dorian didn't know, uncovered in 2004, is that Viki cast the lone vote against her termination.

Swearing revenge on Viki, Dorian becomes the private physician to Viki's ailing father, Victor Lord (Shepperd Strudwick), after she saves him from a near fatal heart-attack while at a party in her home. With dollar signs on her mind, Dorian ended up marrying a grateful Victor in November 1975, to Viki's chagrin. Dorian discovers that the newly arrived Tony Harris (George Reinholt) is Victor's illegitimate son from Viki's maternal aunt. Unable to keep the truth from being revealed, Tony and Victor eventually share an emotional reunion. Wanting to ensure that Tony's presence would not take away from her inheriting Victor's enormous fortune, Dorian succeeds in soon turning Victor and Tony into enemies and keeping them at odds. In the interim, Dorian manipulates Victor into altering his will in her favor. Victor ultimately learned that Dorian was behind his and Tony's contentious relationship, and suffered a massive heart attack during their confrontation on April 30, 1976. Determined to keep her husband from recovering, Dorian springs into action. She has Victor moved from the hospital to Llanfair, her aim being to keep him isolated as much as possible from his children. Caring for Victor with the help of Dr. Peter Janssen (Jeff Pomerantz), she succeeds in preventing Victor from revealing the truth. Soon, a second stroke sends Victor back to the hospital. Victor is then able to summon the strength to ask Dr. Jim Craig (Nat Polen) to bring Viki to his room, much to Dorian's distress. However, once Viki arrives, Victor is only able to utter the words "...Dorian...phone...lawyer..." before collapsing. Under mysterious circumstances, and with Dr. Craig in the room, Victor dies June 16, 1976 without telling children Viki or Tony the truth about his wife's trickery. In the wake of Victor's questionable death, Dorian is named executrix of the Lord family estate. With half of the controlling interest in Lord Enterprises, Dorian is the part-owner of The Banner until Viki assumed control of the newspaper by soon purchasing Dorian's stake.

With their adversarial relationship as heated as ever, Dorian decided to try her hands at Viki's husband, Joe Riley (Lee Patterson). Dorian fueled the fire even more when she told Joe that he was responsible for the hereditary heart condition which afflicted his late daughter with Cathy Craig (Jennifer Harmon), Megan, a secret that Viki kept from him. Dorian's revelation causes a strain on Viki and Joe's relationship and Dorian begins to romance Joe. Joe then begins to suffer blackouts, and Dorian (Strasser on-and-off onward) soon learns Joe has a brain tumor; she then lies, telling him that he got violent with her during his blackouts. Dorian convinces Joe to leave Viki, for Viki's own good. However, Joe becomes wise to Dorian's schemes and swears her out of his life.

Dorian continues to live at the Lord landed estate, Llanfair after Victor's death, while Viki and Joe lived in the carriage house. Joe Riley dies in October 1979, leaving Viki devastated. Joe had brought a new editor for The Banner to take over for himself, a man named Clint Buchanan (Clint Ritchie). Dorian became interested in Clint, and the two engage in a one-night stand. Although Dorian desired a relationship, Clint is then repelled by her unrelenting hatred for Viki. In 1981, a young girl named Cassie (Cusi Cram) came to town claiming to be Dorian's daughter. It is revealed that Dorian had Cassie during medical school, with a man named David "David Renaldi" Reynolds (Michael Zaslow). Dorian, not wanting to give up her career, gave Cassie up to David's mother. Meanwhile, Dorian had her sights on a new man, Llanview District Attorney Herb Callison (Anthony Call). In 1982, Dorian marries Herb at Llanfair, and Herb adopted Cassie and she adopted Herb's surname. Unfortunately for Dorian, Viki seeks to move back into Llanfair, and exploits a clause in Victor's will which states that ownership of Llanfair would revert to Viki if his spouse at death (Dorian) remarried. Dorian refuses to leave, and Viki and new husband Clint kicked her out. In 1984, Herb and Dorian's marriage began to break down. In 1985, Herb and Dorian divorce.

Meanwhile, Dorian is shocked to learn that Victor had another child and was apparently married to a woman other than Viki and sister Meredith's mother, Eugenia Randolph Lord. In 1985, Tina Clayton (Andrea Evans) claims to have been conceived as the result of a love affair-turned-marriage between Victor Lord and Irene Manning. Further, she claims that Dorian and Victor were never married but that Irene was in fact Victor's widow. Tina asserts that she should take over Dorian's half of the Lord estate. Tina showed Dorian the secret room which Victor had built below Llanfair and Dorian then showed Viki, which caused Viki to turn into alter-ego "Niki Smith" for the first time since 1969. Eventually, Viki reemerges again, and Dorian finds an envelope from Victor addressed to her. Inside is a decree certifying that Victor had indeed divorced Irene long before he married Dorian and therefore Dorian, not Irene, was his widow and rightful heir to half of the Lord fortune. A judge gives Tina nothing, but Viki eventually welcomes Tina into the family and as a member of the Lord estate, after which she changes her surname to "Lord".

In 1986 Dorian witnessed Mitch Laurence (Roscoe Born) attempting to rape her daughter Cassie (Ava Haddad). Dorian hit Mitch over the head, apparently killing him. Dorian confesses and is sent to Statesville Prison. While there, she becomes involved in a drug operation headed by (Jamie Sanders) and meets Roberta Coleman. She is later exonerated when a tape surfaces proving she did it in self-defense. In 1987, Dorian receives an appointment to be the U.S. Ambassador to Mendorra and Dorian leaves town.

=== 1990–2000 ===
Dorian returns to town in 1990 (now played by Princi), becoming Herb's campaign manager in his campaign for mayor, running against Viki. Dorian begins a relationship with the much younger Jason Webb (Mark Brettschneider), the nephew of Wanda Webb Wolek (Marilyn Chris). In 1991, a young lady named Blair Daimler (Mia Korf, Kassie DePaiva from 1993 onward) arrives in town and marries Asa Buchanan (Philip Carey). It was later revealed that Blair was in Llanview to seek revenge on Dorian for ignoring Blair's mother, Addie (Pamela Payton-Wright), who was mentally ill. Addie had been Dorian's presumed dead sister. Dorian did not know that Addie was alive or that she had a niece, Blair. Dorian battled other problems in the early 1990s, such as a breast cancer scare.

In 1992, Viki is introduced to a new man, Sloan Carpenter (Roy Thinnes), who admired Viki's father and Dorian's dead husband, Victor. Sloan writes a biography of Victor entitled, "Lord of The Banner", which implicates Dorian (Strasser, onward) in his death. Dorian is deeply offended by this and wages war on Sloan. Sloan plants seeds of intrigue in Viki's mind, and Viki goes to the Llanview police requesting they reopen the investigation on her father's death. An autopsy of Victor finds pillow threads in his lungs, leading them to believe that he was smothered with a pillow. Dorian is then assumed to be guilty and brought to trial for the crime. Dorian is found guilty for the murder of Victor Lord—18 years after the fact. Dorian, however, is aided by a young reporter, David Vickers (Tuc Watkins) who forged an entry into Irene Manning's diary, implicating Irene in the murder. Dorian is freed and plots revenge against Viki. Dorian seduces Viki's son, Joey Buchanan (Nathan Fillion) and causes a rift between Joey and Viki, just as she had caused between Victor and Viki almost 20 years before. Viki is even more disturbed when Sloan dies in early 1995, shortly after their wedding. Viki confronts Dorian and splits into a new personality, "Jean Randolph", when Dorian reveals to Viki that Victor had molested Viki as a child—a fact which was implied throughout the series, that Viki was not consciously aware of, and that Dorian had always known since her marriage to Victor in the 1970s, when he remarked of such events in his sleep. Jean Randolph imprisons Dorian in Victor's secret room for months. Eventually, Dorian is released and blackmailed by Jean into (invalidly) marrying David. Viki eventually undergoes therapy, and it is discovered that Viki, not Dorian, had indeed murdered Victor in 1976. This revelation exonerates Dorian from wrongdoing, though she confesses to Viki that she withheld Victor's medication as he suffered from a heart attack (a fact never shown on-screen). Viki and Dorian reconcile, but only temporarily.

In 1997, Dorian meets a man named Mel Hayes (Stephen Markle). Mel is a reporter who covered her trial and who was previously offered a job at The Banner by Victor Lord in the 1970s. Mel and Dorian hit it off, but she uncovers that he is a recovering alcoholic. Dorian and Mel have their ups-and-downs, and he later investigates Dorian's childhood, causing her great pain. It is revealed that Dorian and her sisters were abused by their mother, Sonya Cramer, who was psychotic. Further, it is revealed that Sonya is still alive, despite being presumed dead at Dorian's original arrival in Llanview in 1973. In a heated confrontation, Sonya (Marian Seldes) tries to kill Cassie, but Dorian picks up a statue and hit her on the head, killing her own mother. Dorian and Mel are briefly apart, but eventually reconcile and marry each other at The Banner. In 1999, however, Mel goes on a trip to a publisher's conference with Viki. Dorian does not want Mel to go and they have a fight. Mel leaves angry and boards the flight. He switches seats with Viki, and Dorian had given the flight attendant a message for Mel saying that his family needs him. The note is given to Viki, and believing the letter to be for her, leaves the plane. The plane crashes, killing Mel. Dorian blames Viki and their age-old feud continues. Dorian later attempts to reconcile with Viki, but then hits her pregnant daughter, Jessica Buchanan (Erin Torpey) with her car, killing her baby. Dorian attempts to cover her crime, though she eventually confesses and seeks Jessica's forgiveness. In early 2000, Drake Faraday (Leigh McCloskey), an old friend of Mel's, comes to town and asks Dorian to leave with him. Dorian agrees and says goodbye to her Cramer women and reconciles with Viki.

=== 2003–2011, 2013 ===
In 2003, it is revealed that Mitch Laurence and Victor (William Stone Mahoney) were both still alive. Stunned, Dorian returns home to find that Mitch had manipulated Victor into changing his will and giving everything to him. Dorian marries Mitch and gains his confidence. Living at Llanfair once again, Dorian plotted to kill Mitch. When Mitch finally died, Dorian leaves Llanfair and has the marriage annulled. The will is also overturned and Victor's original will was reinstated (thus, reinstating Dorian's partial share of the estate). Dorian begins studying for her medical license to be reinstated. In 2004, when Viki needed a heart transplant, Dorian and Viki reconcile once again, and Dorian is given the job of Chief of Staff at Llanview Hospital. Meanwhile, Dorian reveals she had another daughter by unseen mobster Manuel Santi. Adriana Cramer (Melissa Fumero) is revealed as her daughter that she bore while she was in Mendorra but gave her up to protect her from her father. Dorian also begins to reconcile with her ex-husband, David, and the two are to remarry, but David leaves Dorian at the altar. Soon, Dorian begins dating Clint (Jerry verDorn) again. In 2007, Dorian takes in the friend of her great-niece Starr Manning (Kristen Alderson), Langston Wilde (Brittany Underwood), and becomes her foster mother. Buchanan family patriarch Asa dies that year and, at the time of reading of his will, David and Dorian sleep together and Clint breaks up with Dorian. Seeking revenge, Dorian initiated a hostile takeover of Buchanan Enterprises, but she eventually agrees to return it.

In 2009, Dorian runs for Mayor of Llanview against Viki. Dorian runs on a platform of marriage equality and goes so far as to marry a woman on election day. In turn, Dorian is arrested and put in prison, where she discovers Mitch Laurence, who apparently had not died as was previously thought in 1987 and again in 2003. Mitch blackmails Dorian to fire Clint's brother, Bo (Robert S. Woods) as Chief of Police, putting in former mayor and Mitch disciple Stanley Lowell (Kevin O'Rourke) in his place. Dorian then attempts to kill Mitch by bribing Viki's new husband, Charlie Banks (Brian Kerwin), but then attempt to do so herself. Mitch threatens Dorian's girls, and her sister Melinda mysteriously dies in her sleep off-screen.

Dorian continued in her role as Mayor of Llanview throughout 2010 and 2011. She reconciled with Viki after David left her at the altar again and Echo DiSavoy (Kim Zimmer) returns to town and attempted to break up another one of Viki's marriages. Dorian has a sordid history with Echo and tried to destroy her, eventually succeeding by proving that Echo lied to Charlie about the paternity of her biological son, Rex Balsom (John-Paul Lavoisier). Charlie, heartbroken, agrees to Viki's request for a divorce and leaves Llanview. Dorian and David reconcile one last time and marry for the third time, in 2011. In August 2011, Dorian is asked by the governor of Pennsylvania to take over as U.S. senator as the incumbent senator was caught in a sexting scandal. Dorian resigns as mayor, says goodbye to her girls, and reconciled with Viki one final time, leaving Llanview on August 24, 2011. The role of Dorian continues in an off-screen capacity, most notably by talking Blair (Kassie DePaiva) through an impromptu medical procedure on Todd, and pulling strings as a favor to Viki to get an expedited marriage certificate for her sister Tina and Cord Roberts (John Loprieno). After One Life to Live's series finale on January 13, 2012, Dorian's character continued to exist in continuity on sister soap, General Hospital. On the episode first aired on December 3, 2012, it is mentioned that Dorian is still a U.S. Senator and she's on the Senate Intelligence committee, a role in which agents of the CIA refer to her as "the wicked witch of the Intelligence Committee."

In 2013, it is said that Dorian has been involved in a scandal involving the CIA and the delaying of information to fellow committee members; the story was broken by The Banner, the newspaper Dorian's sometimes friend sometimes enemy Viki owns and publishes.
