= Kim Zimmer =

American actress (born 1955)

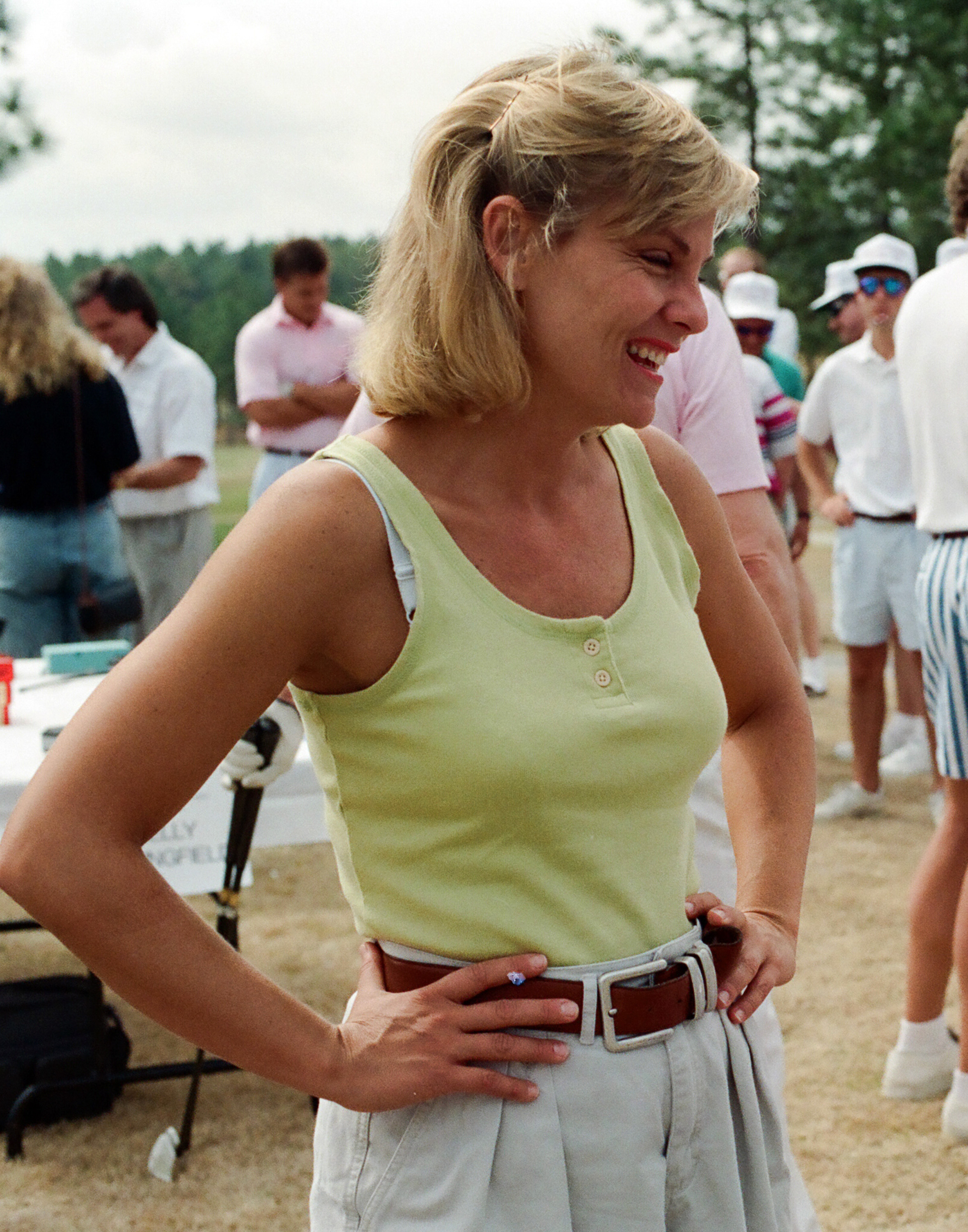
- Zimmer at the 1994 Fayetteville Dogwood Festival
- Born: Kimberly Jo Zimmer; February 2, 1955 (age 71); Grand Rapids, Michigan, U.S.
- Occupation: Actress
- Years active: 1979–present
- Spouse: A.C. Weary (m. 1981)
- Children: 3, including Jake Weary

Kimberly Jo Zimmer (born February 2, 1955) is an American actress, best known for her role as Reva Shayne on the CBS soap opera Guiding Light. For this portrayal, she has won four Daytime Emmy Awards for Outstanding Lead Actress in a Drama Series.

== Career ==
Zimmer's career began with stage work; an early television role was her portrayal of the character of Bonnie Harmer on One Life to Live in 1978. In 1979, she was tapped to replace Kathleen Turner as Nola Dancy Aldrich on The Doctors. (She later appeared opposite Turner in the 1981 film Body Heat in a plot that addressed similarities in their appearance.) For much of her stint, she was the show's leading lady, but left the show in July 1982 on a maternity leave, escorted off the show by her real life husband, A.C. Weary, who played Nola's newest conquest. She would return one last time later in the year for the funeral of her former mother-in-law, Mona Croft. She had a brief return to One Life to Live from February through November 1983 as Echo DiSavoy.

In 1983, Zimmer was cast in the role for which she is best known, the character of Reva Shayne on the television soap opera Guiding Light. Her portrayal of Reva was a focus of the show until Zimmer left in 1990. She returned to Guiding Light in April 1995 and portrayed Reva until the show's conclusion in September 2009. While Zimmer's Reva was paired with several leading men, her work with Robert Newman (Josh) earned them the label of "supercouple."

Zimmer left Guiding Light in July 1990 and moved to the West Coast for five years, during which she played Jodie DeWitt Walker on Santa Barbara from 1992 to 1993. In 1995, Zimmer appeared in an episode of Seinfeld ("The Diplomat's Club"), as Mr. Pitt's attorney, who suspected Elaine and Jerry were trying to kill Mr. Pitt.

In 2010, Zimmer returned to the role of Echo on One Life to Live. Zimmer was featured in a story along with former Guiding Light co-star Jerry verDorn (Clint Buchanan), Robin Strasser (Dorian Cramer) and Erika Slezak (Viki Lord).

Zimmer has also appeared in several episodic television programs, including Designing Women, MacGyver, Models, Inc., University Hospital, and Babylon 5 (episode "And Now For a Word", year 1995). She also appeared in several made-for-television movies.

Zimmer has starred in a number of theater roles, including several at Augusta's Barn Theatre. In 2011, it was announced that Zimmer would be cast in the Off-Broadway international hit Love, Loss, and What I Wore. She starred as Mrs. Hayes in Connecticut Repertory Theatre's production of Odysseus D.O.A., running through March 4, 2012. Zimmer made her musical theatre debut when she joined the first North American tour of Broadway's Wicked. She played the role of Madame Morrible from 14 August 2012 through 13 December 2013. Zimmer returned to the role with the first North American tour on 30 September 2014. Zimmer has also appeared in several productions of the musical Gypsy, first in 2006 at the Barn Theatre in Augusta, Michigan, and in 2015 at the Pittsburgh Civic Light Opera opposite former Guiding Light leading man Robert Newman.

In 2011 she released her memoir called I'm Just Sayin'!: Three Deaths, Seven Husbands and a Clone! My Life as a Daytime Diva.

In 2023, after several years off-screen, Zimmer returned to acting starring in the drama film You Sing Louder, I Sing Louder starring opposite Ewan McGregor and her son Jake Weary.

== Personal life ==
Zimmer was born in Grand Rapids, Michigan, the daughter of Burdina Elva (known as "Dede") Zimmer and Walter Jack Zimmer. She has an older sister Karen Ann (née Zimmer) Witzel. She graduated from Forest Hills Central High School in Ada Township, which is just east of Grand Rapids, and then studied at Hope College in Holland, Michigan, and at American Conservatory Theater in San Francisco. She is married to actor/director A.C. Weary (Allen Cudney Weary), and they have three children: Rachel, Max, and Jake Weary. Jake is also an actor; he appeared on As the World Turns as Luke Snyder in 2005, and has had various guest roles, including on Law and Order: Special Victims Unit and starred as Deran Cody in Animal Kingdom from 2016 to 2022. She resides in Montclair, New Jersey.

On May 16, 2024, during an appearance on a special Stand Up to Cancer benefit episode of the YouTube podcast series The Locher Room, Zimmer revealed that she had been diagnosed with breast cancer in November 2023 and was undergoing treatment.

== Filmography ==
Year	Title	Role	Notes
1978	One Life to Live	Bonnie Harmon	May 3, 1978 – 1978
1979–1982	The Doctors	Nola Dancy Aldrich	Series regular: August 18, 1979 – 1982
1981	Body Heat	Mary Ann	
1983, 2010–2011	One Life to Live	Echo DiSavoy	Series regular, from March to October 1983, October 1, 2010 – October 14, 2011
1983–1990, 1995–2009	Guiding Light	Reva Shayne	Series regular, from November 28, 1983 – August 1990, April 28, 1995 – September 18, 2009; Daytime Emmy Award for Outstanding Lead Actress in a Drama Series (1985, 1987, 1990, 2006); Soap Opera Digest Award for Outstanding Lead Actress in a Daytime Drama (1988, 2000); Nominated - Daytime Emmy Award for Outstanding Lead Actress in a Drama Series (1986, 1998, 1999, 2003, 2004, 2005, 2007); Nominated - Soap Opera Digest Award for Outstanding Lead Actress in a Daytime Drama (1986, 1989, 1990, 1998, 1999, 2003); Nominated — Gold Derby Award for Outstanding Lead Actress in a Drama Series (2004, 2006)
1989	Trenchcoat in Paradise	Claire Hollander	TV movie
1989	Designing Women	Mavis	Episode: "The Rowdy Girls"
1989–1990	MacGyver	Police Lt. Kate Murphy	3 episodes
1991	Hell Hath No Fury	Marlene	TV movie
1991	Keeping Secrets	Maureen	TV movie
1992	FBI: The Untold Stories	Barbara Oswald	Episode: "Lady Skyjacker"
1992–1993	Santa Barbara	Jodie Walker	Series regular Nominated - Soap Opera Digest Award for Outstanding Lead Actress in a Daytime Drama (1993)
1994	The Disappearance of Vonnie	Vonnie Kaczmarek Rickman	TV movie
1994–1995	Models Inc.	Joan	6 episodes
1995	University Hospital	Dr. Karen Hale	Episode: "Shadow of a Doubt"
1995	Babylon 5	Cynthia Torqueman	Episode: "And Now for a Word"
1995	Seinfeld	Lenore	Episode: "The Diplomat's Club"
2003	Shortcut to Happiness	Patty	
2006	Little Secrets	Nico	
2008	The Van Pelt Family	Janet Van Pelt	Short film
2010	Steamboat	Rhonda	Web-series; Nominated — Indie Series Award for Outstanding Supporting Actress
2010	Freshman Father	Dean Frost	TV movie
2013	23 Blast	Mary Freeman	
2019	Venice the Series	Tori	8 episodes
2023	You Sing Louder, I Sing Louder	Elsie	
