= Saskia Wickham =

British actress

- Born: 14 January 1967 (age 59); London, England
- Occupation: Actress
- Spouse(s): Ilya Sapritsky (m. 1991; div. 1995) Robert Bierman (2001 – present)
- Children: 3
- Father: Jeffry Wickham

Saskia Wickham (born 14 January 1967) is a British actress best known for playing Alex Wilton in the drama series Boon, and Dr. Erica Matthews in the ITV television drama series Peak Practice between 1996 and 1998.

== Early and personal life ==
Wickham is the daughter of English actor Jeffry Wickham and Claire Stewart. From an early age, she knew that she wanted to act. Her brother is an actor.

Wickham is married to the television director Robert Bierman, and has three daughters.

== Career ==
At the first annual Ian Charleson Awards in 1991, Wickham received a commendation for her 1990 performance as Sonya in Uncle Vanya at The Old Vic Theatre.

She is best known nationally for playing Dr. Erica Matthews in the ITV television drama series Peak Practice between 1996 and 1998. Other major roles include Gunvor, the love interest of the main character, in Prince of Jutland, who is tragically murdered when pregnant, Clarissa Harlowe in the BBC costume drama mini series Clarissa (1991), Alex Wilton in the ITV series Boon and Claudia Seabrook MP in the BBC drama Our Friends in the North (1996). The actress was cast as a prospective wife for one of the title characters in the one-off The Fast Show spinoff Ted & Ralph. Wickham also appeared in an episode of Midsomer Murders entitled "Last Year's Model".

Between 2001 and 2002, Wickham played a role in the BBC Radio 4 comedy The Leopard in Autumn. She also played chaplain Cordelia Denby in the Channel 4 sitcom Green Wing, and played Luke Rutherford's mother, Jenny Rutherford, in the ITV drama Demons. Wickham appeared in the Channel 4 soap Hollyoaks in March 2013 as Anna Blake.

Wickham also performed as a voice actress, narrating audiobooks such as Anna Karenina, The Two Gentlemen of Verona, and Richard III.

== Filmography ==
Year	Title	Role	Notes
1972	Villains	Saskia	Episode: "Sand Dancer"
1991	Clarissa	Clarissa Harlowe	4 episodes
1992–1995	Boon	Alex Wilton	14 episodes
1994	Prince of Jutland	Gunvor	
1995	Screen Two	Mary Housego	Episode: "The Absence of War"
1995	Angels and Insects	Rowena Alabaster	
1996	Our Friends in the North	Claudia Seabrook	3 episodes
1996	Circles of Deceit: Kalon	Liz Baker	Television film
1996–1998	Peak Practice	Dr. Erica Matthews	38 episodes
1997	Anna Karenina	Dolly	
1998	Ted & Ralph	Wendy Carter	Television film
2002	Stig of the Dump	Caroline	3 episodes
2003	William and Mary	Jemima Harper	Episode: "Episode #1.2"
2003	Waking the Dead	Sally Patterson	2 episodes
2003	Monarch of the Glen	Lizzie MacDonald	Episode: "Episode #5.6"
2004	Green Wing	Chaplain	2 episodes
2005–2011	Holby City	Debbie Green/Jenny Wallis	2 episodes
2006	Judge John Deed	Elaine Brock	Episode: "Lost Youth"
2006	Brief Encounters	Jane Adler	Episode: "Hot or Not"
2006	Midsomer Murders	Annie Woodrow	Episode: "Last Year's Model"
2006–2009	Blue Murder	Det. Supt. Louise Hogg	10 episodes
2009	Demons	Jenny Rutherford	4 episodes
2010	Identity	Caroline Knighton	Episode: "Chelsea Girl"
2012	Victoria Meets	Queen Victoria	Short film
2013	Hollyoaks	Ellie/Anna Blake	27 episodes
2015	Spotless	The Professor	Episode: "Fallowfield"
