= Thomas Callaway (actor) =

American actor and interior designer

Thomas Callaway is an American retired actor, who last performed on screen in 1995. He was also credited as Tom Callaway. He has since become a successful interior designer in the Greater Los Angeles Area.

== Education ==
He graduated from Lawrence University, Appleton, Wisconsin with a bachelor's degree in fine art and architecture. As an undergraduate he was active in campus theatrical productions.

== Career ==
While still working as an actor, he opened a residential and interior design business in 1989 in California, Thomas Callaway and Associates. He created a furniture line in 1990.

== Selected filmography ==
- Falcon Crest as Dr. Otto Foster
- V: The Series as Klaus
- Hart to Hart (episode: "Death Set") as David Craddock
- Murder, She Wrote (episode: "Murder by Twos") as Sam Bryce
- Picket Fences (episode: "The Autumn of Rome") as Paulie Thigpen
- Murphy Brown (episode: "Murphy Buys the Farm") as Mr. Abernathy
- L.A. Law (episode: "The Gods Must Be Lawyers") as Owen Baldwin
- Who's the Boss? (episode: "Your Grandmother's a Bimbo") as Jake Ashby
- Cheers (episode: "Dark Imaginings") as Jack Turner
- Walt Disney's Wonderful World of Color (episode: "The Absent-Minded Professor") as Prof. Donald
- Two Idiots in Hollywood as T. Barry Armstrong
- Young Guns as Texas Joe Grant
- Punky Brewster (episode: "No No, We Won't Go") as Benjamin J. Kramer
- The Alamo: Thirteen Days to Glory (TV Movie) as Col. James W. Fannin
- Cowboy Joe (TV Movie) as "Cowboy Joe Cutler"
- Designing Women (episode: "New Year's Daze") as Shadow
- Washingtoon as Bob Forehead
- WKRP in Cincinnati, ("Jennifer Falls in Love". Season 2, Episode 27, October 29, 1979) as Steel Hawthorne
- M*A*S*H (episode: "Run for the Money") as Captain Sweeney
- Laverne & Shirley (episode: "Watch the Fur Fly" January 19, 1982) as Harold
- The Jeffersons (episodes "Laundry Is a Tough Town" parts 1 & 2) as Steve Winslow.
- Airwolf (1985) Season 2 episode 10 Heros as Senator Gary Wallace
