= Supercouple =

Popular or wealthy pairing

Fictional couple Luke Spencer and Laura Webber are credited with defining the term supercouple.

A supercouple or super couple (also known as a power couple) is a popular and/or wealthy pairing that intrigues and fascinates the public in an intense or obsessive fashion. The term originated in the United States, and it was coined in the early 1980s when intense public interest in fictional soap opera couple Luke Spencer and Laura Webber, from General Hospital, made the pair a popular culture phenomenon.

First applied to fiction, supercouple can be used to refer to couples from television dramas and film, such as Gone with the Wind's Rhett Butler and Scarlett O'Hara. The term was expanded to real-life pairings; tabloids and the mainstream media have focused on wealthy or celebrity couples, such as the romances between Ben Affleck and Jennifer Lopez (which became known by the portmanteau "Bennifer") and of Brad Pitt and Angelina Jolie ("Brangelina").

== Definitions ==
Supercouples are defined as popular or financially wealthy pairings that are widely admired in an intense or obsessive fashion and influence society's expectations of what a great love story or relationship should be; they may or may not be romantic or high-profile, and interest in the pairings may be due to a combination of chemistry, physical attractiveness, or because they seem fated.

The term supercouple first appeared in 1981, with the wedding of General Hospital's Luke and Laura. Thirty million viewers tuned into the event, and the widespread media attention it received from prominent newspapers and magazines set the pairing up as the default model for other soap opera supercouples. The model Luke and Laura originally followed consisted of action stories, romance, and obstacles for the couple to overcome. This paradigm subsequently became ideal of fictional soap opera supercouples in America, and extended to other genres. In Queer TV: Framing Sexualities On US Television, Nancy Martin says, "Actively desiring heterosexual pairs not bent on reproduction became a required advertising device and a narratological mainstay on daytime and primetime." In Russian Television Today, David MacFadyen concludes, "Even the busiest, most rambling soap operas are often neatly and conclusively distilled in the public's mind by a 'supercouple' or tiny, central pair of protagonists." Luke and Laura's popularity resulted in fictional supercouples generally being regarded as soulmates. The pairings have typically overcome numerous obstacles or significant strife in order to be together.

Though a successful model, the concept has been criticized for hindering the growth of characters' relationships with other love interests; this has resulted in alternate definitions for the term. In her essay criticism of the term, The Siren Call of the Super Couple (ed. Suzanne Frentz, 1992), Diana Reep describes the love of a supercouple as "so perfect that they are incapable of having romantic feelings for anyone else under any circumstances. In addition, the two have no personal flaws or idiosyncrasies that could interfere with their perfect love. Only an evil, outside force could disturb their relationship". While Days of Our Lives former supervising producer Al Rabin credited the supercouple aspect as the secret to the show's success, his then-executive producer Ken Corday stated, "By definition, supercouple excludes others on the show. Every time they walk into a room, every other character, no matter how important, becomes window dressing, I've never believed in it." Corday added, "Either people are involved in a good story or they're not. They're an interesting couple or they're not."

Celebrity couples may also be regarded as supercouples. Interest in the pairings ranges from media and public obsession to calculation of the couples' combined finances.

== Internet and media trends ==
Fans often use portmanteau to refer to their favorite couples on online message boards, a significant aspect of the "shipping fandom". The "shipping fandom" scene, whose name is derived from the word "relationship", is a general term for fans' emotional or intellectual involvement with the ongoing development of romance in a work of fiction. Though technically applicable to any such involvement, it refers chiefly to various related social dynamics observable on the Internet, and is seldom used outside of that context. "Shipping" can involve virtually any kind of relationship—from the well-known and established, to the ambiguous or those undergoing development, and even to the highly improbable and the blatantly impossible. People involved in shipping (or shippers) assert that the relationship does exist, will exist, or simply that they would like it to exist.

"Portmanteaux first came about with Lewis Carroll" as a way to blend words, stated Jonathan Gabay, author of the Copywriter's Compendium—a reference guide to the English language. Gabay added that people blend words in this fashion because sometimes there are words an individual wants, but those words do not actually exist. "There's a feeling you are trying to get out", he said. For fictional pairings, examples showcase themselves as Logan and Veronica (Veronica Mars) becomes "LoVe", Josh and Reva (Guiding Light) becomes "Jeva", Jack and Kate (Lost) becomes "Jate", Michael and Sara (Prison Break) becomes "MiSa", and so on. Some couples are given more complex portmanteaux; on How I Met Your Mother, the pairing of Barney and Robin is referred to as "BROTP", incorporating their initials, their platonic status as "bros", and the popular fandom term OTP ("One True Pairing"). Seth Cohen of the show The O.C. parodied name-blending trends when he talked about real couples' overexposure to one another; he wondered whether or not his pairing with Summer Roberts would be called "Summereth" or "Sethummer".

Gabay said portmanteaux "...giv[e] people an essence of who they are within the same name. In double-barrelled names, the hyphen is almost pushing one name away from the other. Meshing says 'I am you and you are me', which is rather romantic". Occasionally, even anti-fans come up with names for couples, such as General Hospital's Sonny Corinthos and Emily Quartermaine. The unpopular pairing of the mob boss and his enforcer's sweet younger sister became known as "Soily". Similarly, name-blending exists with celebrities' first names. Said to be a sign of commitment and togetherness, meshing is also seen by some as an attempt to banish what might be considered a "sexist" tradition of a woman taking her husband's name when she marries.

In other Internet trends, fans often take part in making fan videos (also referred to as fanvids, a compilation of favorite scenes stylishly intercut as music videos or other various forms of entertainment) and writing fanfiction (alternative endings and stories to the original story's outcome) for their favorite pairings. Sites such as YouTube, Archive of Our Own, and Fanfiction.net help to facilitate this.

== Soap operas ==
=== Origins ===
According to American soap opera writer and romance novelist Leah Laiman, soap operas are best known and most remembered for romance. The romances in daytime dramas are significantly characterized by bringing couples together, splitting them up, and starting the cycle over again to ensure that viewers remain invested in the pairings, if popular. This is a strategy that often succeeds within the medium. A supercouple storyline is typically detailed by the couple's facing seemingly insurmountable challenges, such as a difference in social class, strong family interference, simple disagreements, marriages to other people, children with other people, etc.

Two characters comprising a supercouple will usually reunite and marry, while the most significant obstacle for the pairing is the soap opera genre itself; as soap operas typically continue for decades, there is no closure for the pairing unless both characters leave the show together or one of them dies. It is because of this, that after the usual fairytale wedding, if the supercouple remains on the series, writers do not allow the item to live happily ever after as a couple in a fairy tale would but rather subject them to a continual cycle of being separated and reunited. This factor has contributed to two characters of a supercouple normally divorcing and remarrying each other a few or several times. Author Diana Reep argues that the supercouple phenomenon creates "serious storyline problems" for producers and writers due to characters' being destined for only one lover:

The problem supercouples create for storytellers is that, as characters, therefore, they are unchanging in a narrative form that emphasizes evolving characters and relationships... and as ideals, supercouples bring closure to a relationship in a world that is based in continuing expectations of change.

Creators within the medium generally focus more on the benefits of supercouples rather than the potential problems the pairings can produce. Former One Life to Live co-head writer Josh Griffith said that the key to a show's success is "passionate, romantic storytelling and pairings, and that's what creates a supercouple". To him, they embody love and passion.

=== Legends ===
Although the term was not coined until the early 1980s, some couples prior to that point have been retrospectively termed supercouples; for example, Jeff Baker and Penny Hughes and Bob and Lisa Hughes, from As the World Turns. Doug Williams and Julie Olson from Days of Our Lives are sometimes considered the first supercouple. From 1970 until 1976, Doug and Julie's relationship wavers between love and hate. The chemistry the portrayers exhibited became evident offscreen; the real-life couple, Bill Hayes and Susan Seaforth, were married in 1974. This set off a commotion among thousands of fans, who wrote letters to the show asking that the couple also be allowed to marry in the story. Since the actors were already married, they felt this was a valid request. NBC worked the tension and lengthened the anticipation of the wedding but eventually caved into the audience's pressure. Doug and Julie are married in October 1976 within the series. They are the first soap opera characters to appear on the cover of Time.

Luke Spencer and Laura Webber, portrayed by Anthony Geary and Genie Francis from General Hospital, are considered the most famous soap opera supercouple. Their romance enthralled viewers; when they wed on November 16, 1981, American daytime television recorded its highest-ever ratings, with 30 million people tuning in to watch them say "I do". Elizabeth Taylor made a cameo appearance during the wedding, and Princess Diana reportedly sent champagne. The couple was featured on the covers of People and Newsweek, and was credited with having brought "legitimacy to daytime serials" and its fans by crossing boundaries and becoming celebrities in the mainstream media. As a result, Luke and Laura have become regarded as daytime television's quintessential and most iconic couple. While Guiding Light has the smallest number of supercouples, the series still had prominent pairings, notably Quint and Nola, as well as Josh and Reva, one of the central supercouples from the 1980s onward. In 1982, All My Children's Jesse and Angie became the first black supercouple.

"Dirty" Den and Angie Watts, portrayed by Leslie Grantham and Anita Dobson on the British soap opera EastEnders, generated an audience response similar to Luke and Laura's. Den and Angie are renowned as arguably Britain's most iconic soap opera couple, having broken the record for episode ratings to 30.1 million viewers in 1986 on the episode of their divorce, a record that remains unbeaten by any British soap opera episode today.

=== Golden Age: 1980s ===
The 1980s is known as the "Golden Age" of supercouples. Shows such as All My Children, As the World Turns and along with the aforementioned General Hospital and Days of our Lives were well known for their supercouples. Days of our Lives in particular had a significant number of supercouples — Bo and Hope, Shane and Kimberly, Patch and Kayla, and Jack and Jennifer all going on at roughly the same time. The show soon featured John and Marlena. All My Children was represented by Cliff and Nina, Greg and Jenny, Jesse and Angie, and later by Tad and Dixie.

As the World Turns had the popular couples Holden and Lily, Craig and Sierra, Tom and Margo, and Steve and Betsy with Betsy Stewart being portrayed by future film star Meg Ryan. Along with Luke and Laura, General Hospital also boasted Alan and Monica and Frisco and Felicia. At the same time, Santa Barbara introduced another supercouple, Cruz and Eden.

The supercouple phenomenon spread to foreign shores, with Scott and Charlene, portrayed by Jason Donovan and Kylie Minogue on the Australian soap opera Neighbours. The success of their romance prompted a fellow Australian daytime drama Home and Away to shelve out their own supercouple, Shane and Angel, and Den and Angie from EastEnders emerged as Britain's most famous soap opera couple.

Sheraton Kalouria, NBC's Vice President of Daytime Programming, said he believes in the "it" factor regarding fictional couples. "It's hard to imagine Bo and Hope as a supercouple and divorce that from the magnetic chemistry of Peter Reckell and Kristian Alfonso", he stated. "Or Cruz and Eden from Santa Barbara days and A Martinez and Marcy Walker. Or McKenzie Westmore as Sheridan and Galen Gering as Luis, if I might be so bold as to dub them a supercouple. Actors bring a huge excitement to [their pairing]."

=== Decline and remolding: 1990s–2000s ===
==== Popular, traditional, and altered setups ====
Popular couplings on soap operas exist today, but there are few termed supercouples by fans or the soap opera media. Usually, the term is reminiscent of the 1970s and 1980s. As such, supercouples that are still on serials today are mostly from the 1980s, or early 1990s. After the mid-1990s, the supercouple phenomenon slowly faded and the nature of soap operas today allows few couples to define the nature of the show anymore as original supercouples once did.

Days of our Lives executive producer Ken Corday said that while he feels that "love in the afternoon" is still important to the genre, the supercouple title "disappeared from [his] vocabulary when Al Rabin [his supervising producer] left the show". All My Children and One Life to Live creator Agnes Nixon argued, "[Supercouples are] still a vital component whenever possible." She stressed the importance of creating "young love [stories], the Romeo and Juliet" of tomorrow.

Shows have attempted to revive the success of supercouples through modern couples. There are instances when a character becomes a part of two popular pairings, where both couples which include the character develop the same or close to the same amount of positive fan reaction from viewers. This causes a certain rivalry between the two couples, with both vying for the title of supercouple. An example of this was especially evident with the mid-1990s storyline of General Hospital's Sonny Corinthos, Brenda Barrett, and Jasper "Jax" Jacks, often referred to as "the hottest love triangle in soap opera history" by the soap opera media. The couple combinations within the love triangle were equally in demand, and which of the two is a true supercouple remains in dispute. Though debated, both couples are referenced and listed as supercouples by the soap opera medium. The Sonny character eventually acquired second supercouple status in the pairing of Sonny and Carly, becoming a part of two successful on-screen romances.

In other instances, a character is part of two equally popular couplings, but the storyline does not lend itself to the scenario being referred to as a love triangle. Samantha "Sami" Brady of the soap opera Days of our Lives is romantically desired by the two men, Lucas Roberts and EJ Wells. However, she was not considered to be actively involved in a love triangle, and both couples (Lucas and Sami and EJ and Sami) resonate with fans and appear to be at least equal in comparison and popularity.

In today's soap opera medium, there are couples which come close to gaining supercouple status in terms of popularity. Although these pairings have perceived chemistry and potential, the couple's story is cut short, often due to the actors leaving to pursue jobs outside of soap operas or due to the writers changing direction in a storyline. These couples do not last long enough onscreen to garner the long history of what is often considered a genuine supercouple. Such couples include Leo and Greenlee (All My Children), Ryan and Gillian (All My Children), Dusty and Lucy (As the World Turns), Simon and Katie (As the World Turns), Paul and Meg (As the World Turns), Robin and Stone (General Hospital), Jonathan and Tammy (Guiding Light), and Todd and Téa (One Life to Live).

Soap opera columnist Carolyn Aspenson stated that the "supercouple formula" should be redefined. She argued that tragic couples such as Leo and Greenlee are a better love story than if they had stayed together with a "boring" everyday life. "A super couple shouldn't be designed to be a couple that beats the odds and sticks it out no matter what," she said. "We're left with nothing on those terms. Instead, try redefining a super couple by the intensity of their love, their loss and their ability to move on without their other half. It leaves us frustrated, heartbroken and yearning for more. To me, that is the definition of a super couple."

==== Gay and lesbian ====
Soap operas traditionally featured only heterosexual romance. For American soap opera, this began to change with characters Bianca Montgomery, Lena Kundera, and Maggie Stone from All My Children. Bianca's unveiling as a lesbian was unique for daytime television. By being a core character and the daughter of legendary diva Erica Kane, "the show initiated an innovative discourse about the possibility, location, and representation of lesbian and gay characters in a television genre historically predicated on the celebration of heterosexual courtship, romance, and family life".

In 2003, Bianca's relationship with Lena resulted in American daytime's first lesbian kiss. The two became American daytime's first lesbian couple, and received significant press. Though Lena and Bianca's romance was well-received, popular, and the couple became responsible for several historic moments within daytime television, it was Bianca's relationship with close confidante Maggie that thoroughly captivated viewers. The romance was considered unique and especially significant due to the show's insistence that Maggie was not gay; the show's insistence did not deter viewers from wanting the two romantically paired, and they often wrote in to the network (ABC) demanding that Bianca and Maggie become an official item. Eventually, hints that Maggie might not be heterosexual started to appear throughout the series, complicated by Maggie insisting that she is not gay but is rather "into guys" and only guys. Yet fan mail for the Bianca and Maggie pairing was prominent. The couple's popularity grew beyond soap opera press, as newspapers and television magazines became fascinated by the love story as well. TV Guide, The Advocate, and Daily News were among the media taking interest. The pairing eventually became the most popular gay couple in soap opera history, which surprised industry insiders who had not believed that a gay pairing could be as significantly in demand as heterosexual pairings. Though Bianca and Maggie's romance was not made official until both were offscreen, it made clear to writers and executives who had been conflicted about including gay and lesbian love stories that the daytime audience was interested. Bianca and Maggie subsequently became American soap opera's first same-sex supercouple.

Soap opera analyst C. Lee Harrington stated, "While the past decade has witnessed a growing number of lesbian, gay, bisexual, and transgender characters in primetime dramas and situation comedies, daytime soap operas offer unique challenges (and possibilities) regarding the inclusion and 'normalization' of varied sexualities in entertainment television." Daytime television has been ahead of primetime for some time in exploring diverse or controversial storylines and characters, with the one glaring exception being homosexuality. Gay and lesbian issues or characters were invisible in 1950s and early 1960s TV. When it came to the mainstream shows, audiences were built up as "replications of the idealized, middle-class nuclear family, defined as monogamous heterosexual couples with children" (Buxton, 1997, p. 1477). Because of this perception of what was ideal, networks geared programming toward it, feeling that viewers were exactly like these images on their television screens.

In contrast to primetime, daytime dramas have different obstacles to developing innovative programming, with their advertising sponsors being more conservative, their audience smaller and "genre restrictions that emphasize continuity and respect for history over innovation". Soap opera tried its first chance at including a gay character back in 1983 on All My Children. Actress Donna Pescow portrayed Dr. Lynn Carson, who "comes out" as a lesbian to patient and confidante Devon Shepherd McFadden (Tricia Pursley). The two women admit to having romantic feelings for each other, and that is as far as the relationship goes.

A prominent obstacle for gay and lesbian characters on daytime television is interference from television network executives who fear a decline in their ratings. The characters are often denied fulfilling and lasting romances with others of the same sex. "Before Bianca's gay character was written into All My Children, the purpose of gay characters was to make a point or explain homosexuality for the audience—a task handled within the course of a few episodes," said Zach Hudson of Washington Blade. "The distraught parents or angry bullies who caused the early gay characters so much turmoil would suddenly see the light. Then the story—and the character—would simply vanish." It was not until Bianca that prominent gay characters and couples seemed possible within American daytime. Since then, American soap operas have tried to replicate the success of the Bianca character with the introduction of their own gay and lesbian characters. One soap opera in particular, As the World Turns, has been successful in launching the first popular romance between two men on an American daytime drama, Luke Snyder and Noah Mayer. In late 2007, the two make television history by carrying out the first kiss between two male lovers on an American soap opera. The popularity of the pairing borders on the same fascination level that centered around Bianca and Maggie's lesbian romance. Not even months into the romantic aspect of their relationship, TV Guide named the male duo a top power couple.

Noah Mayer became one of the latest soap opera characters to come out as gay, and joined Bianca and others as visible gay characters in daytime. One year before Luke and Noah, the British soap opera Hollyoaks had already embarked on issuing their own gay male supercouple, between characters John Paul McQueen and Craig Dean; the storyline became one of the show's most successful, gaining "legions" of fans. The budding same-sex romance on Guiding Light between Olivia Spencer and Natalia Rivera Aitoro became popular with fans in 2009. That same year, One Life to Live introduced its own male gay supercouple with Oliver Fish and Kyle Lewis. On international television, the German soap opera Verbotene Liebe gained international popularity, with the storylines involving Carla and Stella, and later with the couple of Christian and Oliver.

Beginning in 2011, Days of our Lives broke new ground when it decided to have the character Will Horton come out as gay. The soap chronicled Will's struggle to accept his sexuality. The show also highlighted many obstacles the LGBT community face, such as bullying, hate crimes and gay slurs. The show cast actor Freddie Smith in the role of Jackson "Sonny" Kiriakis, the second openly gay contracted character in a daytime soap opera. Sonny would eventually become Will's ongoing love interest. To the surprise of the actors and writers, Will and Sonny were greeted with fan support, and were eventually titled a supercouple and "power couple". The show pushed the envelope even further when it decided to air Will's first same-sex sexual encounter on-screen (which would become the first of many). Chandler Massey went on receive the 2012 Daytime Emmy Award for Outstanding Younger Actor in a Drama Series, becoming the first actor ever to receive a Daytime Emmy Award for playing a gay character. He won his second consecutive Emmy for the role in the same category in 2013. Smith received his first Daytime Emmy nomination for his role in 2013 pitting him against Massey for the same award. In his acceptance speech, Massey thanked Smith. The show won the GLAAD Media Award for Outstanding Daily Drama in 2013. In August 2013, it was announced that Massey had filmed his final episode as Will Horton, and that a recast had already been made. Days had initially planned not to recast the role, but changed its mind due to fear of advertiser and fan backlash.

In either aspect, fictional gay and lesbian romances have been argued as making an impact. "These stories have the ability to reach the many different generations of viewers who watch daytime and share with them stories of our lives," stated Damon Romine, media entertainment director for the GLAAD organization. "What viewers are seeing is that more and more of their own neighbors and friends are dealing with these issues, and the soaps are merely reflecting the reality of the world we live in."

== Primetime television ==
A paradigm used for primetime couples is the love-hate relationship plotline. In the television series Dynasty, characters Krystle and Blake (Linda Evans and John Forsythe) are seen fighting for years, through ex-lovers and a host of other interferences. Krystle winds up in a coma and Blake spends years in jail, but their love eventually wins out over their problems. This resulted in the couple subsequently becoming one of television's classic supercouples. Other early primetime power couplings include Ricky and Lucy (Desi Arnaz and Lucille Ball) from I Love Lucy, Pam and Bobby (Victoria Principal and Patrick Duffy) from Dallas, and Cliff and Clair Huxtable (Bill Cosby and Phylicia Rashad) from The Cosby Show, among others.

Television shows also produce tragic love stories, such as Buffy and Angel from the series Buffy the Vampire Slayer. The pairing's persistent fight to be together is considered to have cemented their place in supercouple history. Voted #2 on IGN's list of Top 10 Favorite TV Couples, and #5 on AOL's list of Greatest TV Couples of All Time, the sites categorized the pairing as "the ultimate" star-crossed couple. The pairing's main predicament—unable to experience sexual intimacy without Angel losing his humanity—has been summarized by IGN:

After all, when you're a Vampire Slayer, it hardly seems like the appropriate person to fall for would be a Vampire. But fall for Angel Buffy did, setting up one of the most involving and tragic love stories we can remember on TV. After all, it's pretty rare for one half of a great couple to go from gentle and caring to sadistic and murderous in the course of a single night...and spurred on by having sex with the girl he loves no less.

Tragedy comes about when Buffy has to face off with her true love Angel in order to save the world; episode "Becoming, Part Two".

Creator of the series Joss Whedon said, "'Becoming', Parts 1 and 2 ... really sort of charted the main points of the Buffy–Angel relationship in all its difficulty and romance." Buffy's portrayer, Sarah Michelle Gellar, said, "I think deep down Buffy will always love Angel and she will never love anyone the way in which she loves him. I think they found a wonderful supercouple in Buffy and Angel."

Certain shows may not be adequately suited for a tragic-love storyline. For comedies, the approach of pairing mismatched couples is also often applied, and for dramas, there tends to be a "will-they-won't-they" setup. Website Cinemablend states that there are two general formulas for a "will-they-wont-they" setup. "The first one is when one person pursues the other, then finally gives up and dates someone else," the site stated, "and the other scenario is when the two characters are so different and often do not get along with one another, they fight and argue constantly, but then one thing or a series of 'things' happen and they are forced to put up with each other." Examples of popular couples cited for having displayed this formula are Buffy and Spike (of Buffy the Vampire Slayer), Ross and Rachel (of the show Friends), Logan and Veronica (of the show Veronica Mars), among others.

There are numerous shows that tend to pair up two unexpected characters together. For instance, Pacey Witter and Joey Potter from the teen drama Dawson's Creek. Pacey and Joey did not like each other at all first, and Joey was in love with her supposed soulmate Dawson Leery, but they eventually fell in love and became a supercouple of the show. Kurt Hummel and Blaine Anderson and Santana Lopez and Brittany Pierce from Glee are regularly quoted as TV's first LGBTQ supercouples.

A well-known "will-they-won't-they" setup is the relationship of supercouple Agent Fox Mulder and Agent Dana Scully from the science fiction/thriller series The X-Files. Mulder and Scully, two FBI agents investigating cases that involve the paranormal, are showcased as having a relationship which borders on subtle hints of romance throughout the series without the two being heavily romantically involved. Though anticipation for Mulder and Scully to romantically commit to each other had existed for years among the show's fanbase, the pairing's romantic intimacy was not written as soon as fans would have hoped for; when the two are finally shown sharing a kiss in 1999 after seven seasons of buildup, some viewers felt the show waited too long to script the event. Critics state that in such cases, if a series extends sexual tension for "too long" before finally acting on romantic intimacy between the characters, it can result in viewers feeling that the best part of the pairing's buildup was their "will-they-won't-they" status.

With some fictional supercouples from soap opera or primetime, the couple may have started out as an unexpected pairing and with or without a paradigm. Due to viewers becoming excited over the prospect of chemistry between the two, the show's producers and writers later decide to pair them.

== Film ==
Given that films inherently have a shorter amount of time to develop characters and carry out storylines, the task of convincing the audience that the film's couple are adequately suited for each other can be challenging. This is especially evident in cases where there is not enough plot focusing on the buildup of the characters' interaction, which can make the love story seem contrived. A memorable line or catchphrase spoken between the characters has been suggested as a remedy to this, since it can elevate a pairing's popularity.

Films may resort to the notion that romance is a solution to life's problems or is unchangeable, tapping into a "love conquers all" appeal; for example, in "doomed" romances where the underlying message is that the love the couple shared endured even though their time together was cut short. A film supercouple can be a couple appearing with the same actors over the course of few or several films, making the actors the supercouples rather than the characters.

== Celebrity ==
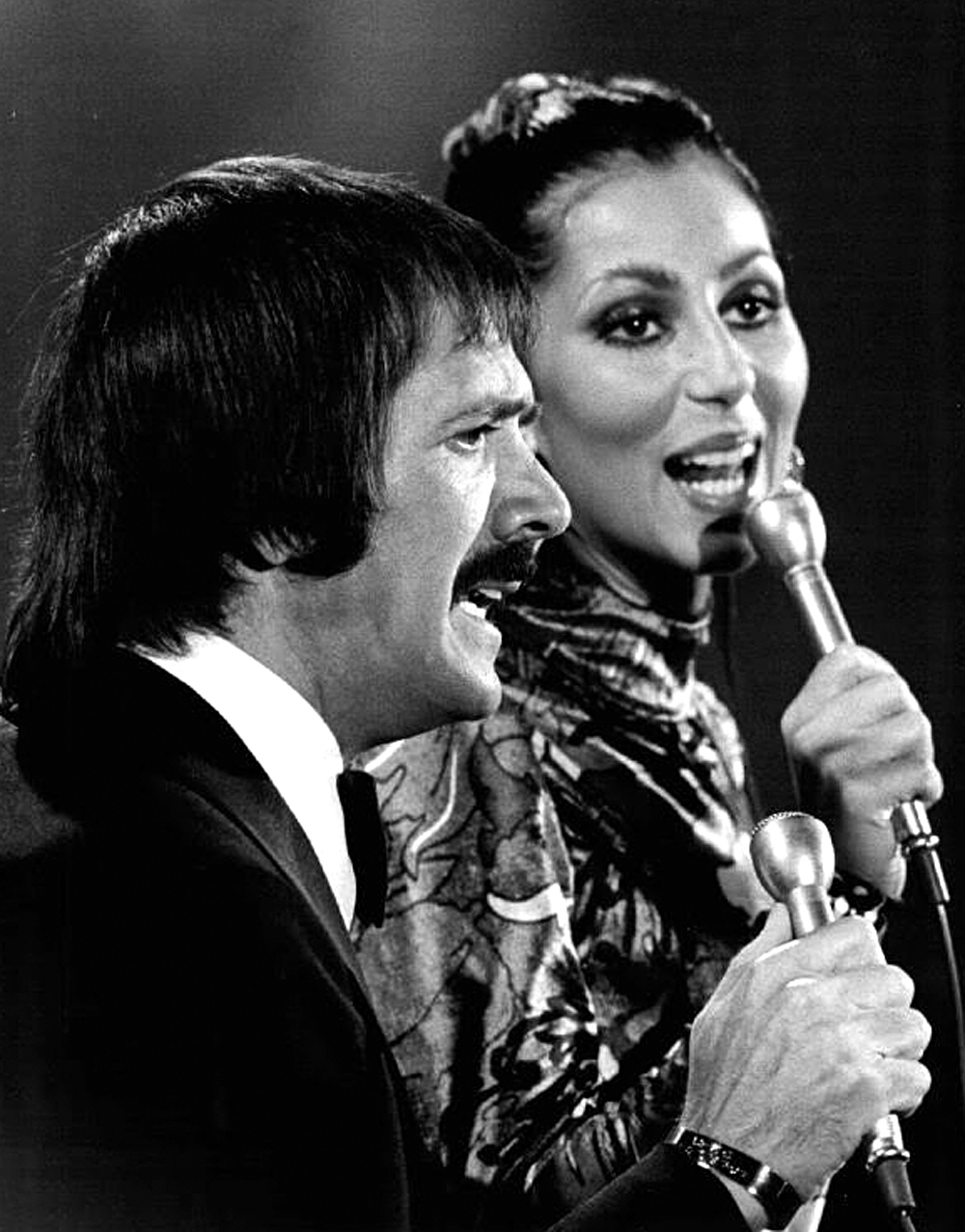
Former supercouple Sonny & Cher at The Sonny & Cher Show

The media often focuses on celebrity pairings. Celebrity couples who are viewed as fascinating or create a power coupling due to finances are singled out as supercouples. Since the term was coined, classic Hollywood couples have been regarded as supercouples, including Clark Gable and Carole Lombard. People magazine stated that Gable and Lombard were "more than just Golden Age window dressing. The love they shared for six years was that Hollywood rarity: the real thing." They were titled "The King of Hollywood and the Queen of Screwball Comedy", respectively, and eloped during a break in production on Gable's Gone with the Wind in 1939. Lombard died three years later in a plane crash on her way home from a war bond rally. Desi Arnaz and Lucille Ball were the stars and producers of I Love Lucy, and have since been credited as an onscreen and offscreen supercouple. They divorced in 1960 after 20 years of marriage. People described Gable and Lombard, Spencer Tracy and Katharine Hepburn, Frank Sinatra and Ava Gardner, and Richard Burton and Elizabeth Taylor, were couples recognized as "the greatest love stories of the century".

The supercouple title has been similarly prolific with modern celebrity pairings. In 1997, rapper/actor Will Smith married actress Jada Pinkett. The couple were titled a supercouple due to their combined film star allure and perceived physical attractiveness. In 2003 and 2008, People magazine categorized them as a supercouple due to their long marriage and widespread celebrity status. Smith spoke of the power of love as a connective force to Essence magazine. "The truth about life is that we're all alone," he said. "But when somebody loves you, that experience is shared. Love is the only real connective tissue that allows you to not live and die by yourself." In 1998, Brad Pitt met Friends actress Jennifer Aniston, and married her in a private wedding ceremony in Malibu on July 29, 2000. They were titled a supercouple, regarded as one of the film industry's most powerful, and their marriage was considered a rare Hollywood success. In January 2005, Pitt and Aniston announced they decided to formally separate after seven years together. Two months later, Aniston filed for divorce, citing irreconcilable differences. In November 2000, Michael Douglas married Welsh actress Catherine Zeta-Jones, and the pair, 25 years apart in age, were considered a supercouple.

Pairing Ben Affleck and Jennifer Lopez incited unprecedented media attention for an American modern-day supercouple during their 2002–2004 relationship. The two were referred to as the first superstar couple of the Internet age, and the couple's popularity resulted in their being known by the portmanteau "Bennifer" (for Ben and Jennifer) to the media, as well as to fans using the name combination. The term Bennifer itself became popular and started the trend of other celebrity couples being referred to by the combination of each other's first names. The pairing eventually succumbed to overexposure, which caused public interest in their romance to result in less admiration and negatively affected their careers. In 2007, Affleck stated:

[The romance] was probably bad for my career. What happens is this sort of bleed-over from the tabloids across your movie work. You go to a movie, you only go once. But the tabloids and Internet are everywhere. You can really subsume the public image of somebody. I ended up in an unfortunate crosshair position where I was in a relationship and [the media] mostly lied and inflated a bunch of salacious stuff for the sake of selling magazines. And I paid a certain price for that. Then, in concert with some movies that didn't work...

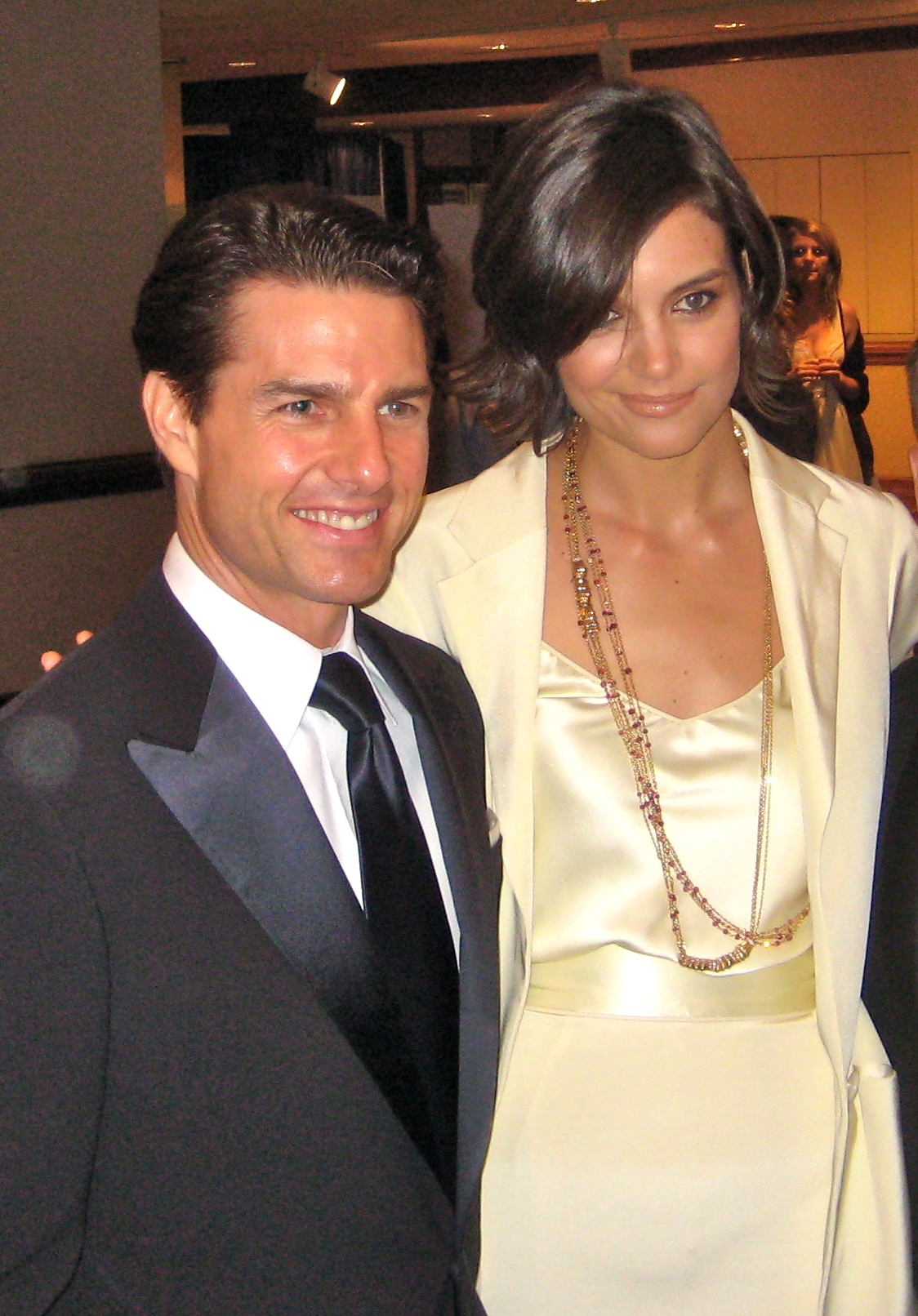
Former supercouple Cruise and Holmes

A celebrity supercouple to emerge after Bennifer was "TomKat" (the coupling of celebrity stars Tom Cruise and Katie Holmes), and other countries had already adopted the supercouple term. The United Kingdom had Hugh Grant and Elizabeth Hurley (Grant 'n' Hurley) and Posh and Becks (Victoria and David Beckham). Japan had Tomonori Jinnai and Norika Fujiwara; Jinnai established himself as a television regular and a "pin-geinin" or solo comedian while Fujiwara, a former Miss Japan, became known as a successful actress and "one of the business's biggest earners with a string of commercial contracts, regular TV and stage roles, and also active in charitable causes". They were titled "one of the 'super couples' of Japanese showbiz" and "held their elaborate traditional wedding on February 17, 2007 at the Ikutajinja shrine in Fujiwara's hometown of Kobe, with hundreds of reporters and thousands of fans craning for a glimpse outside" and "invited 600 guests to the Hotel Okura the following April for a wedding reception that cost over ¥500 million. The event was broadcast live on TV and had a high audience rating of 40% in the Kansai region".

Another American couple regularly titled a supercouple are musicians Jay-Z and Beyoncé, also known as The Carters. Their marriage in New York City in early 2008, was reported by People. Beyoncé and Jay-Z were listed as the most powerful couple for Time magazine's 100 most influential people of 2006. In January 2009, Forbes ranked them as Hollywood's top-earning couple, with a combined total of $162 million. They also made it to the top of the list the following year, with a combined total of $122 million between June 2008 and June 2009. As of 2026, the couple has a combined total net worth of $3.8 billion.

The spotlight and attention given to American celebrity supercouples reached its height in 2006, when the celebrity phenomenon dubbed "Brangelina" triggered media obsession surrounding screen stars Brad Pitt and Angelina Jolie. The two emerged as a prominent supercouple,

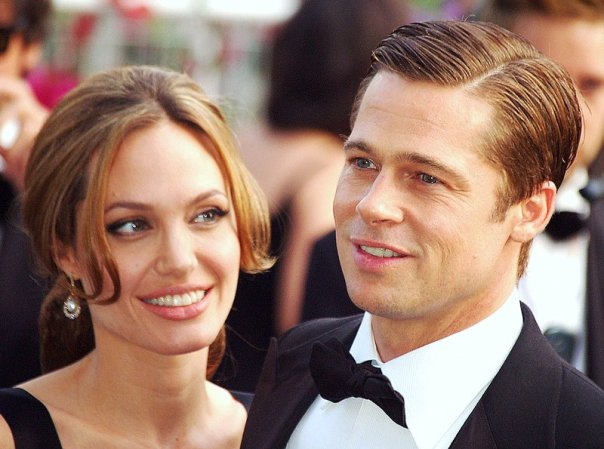
Former supercouple Brad Pitt and Angelina Jolie, dubbed "Brangelina", at the 2007 Cannes Film Festival

Robert Thompson, director of the Centre for the Study of Popular Television, said the coupling of A-list stars like Pitt and Jolie, or in years gone by Elizabeth Taylor and Richard Burton, was "a paparazzi's dream come true". He added that "as silly as it sounds, this new tendency to make up single names for two people, like 'Bennifer' (Ben Affleck and Jennifer Lopez) and 'TomKat' (Tom Cruise and Katie Holmes), is an insightful idea'. 'Brangelina' has more cultural equity than their two star parts."

In India, cricketer Virat Kohli and Bollywood actress Anushka Sharma started dating in 2013, and married in December 2017, forming one of contemporary India's most famous and talked-about supercouple. They have been referred to as 'Virushka', in line with Hollywood pairings such as 'Brangelina'. Similarly, actors John Abraham and Bipasha Basu are a former supercouple. Other Indian power couples, usually associated with the Hindi film industry, include: Amitabh Bachchan and Jaya Bachchan; Abhishek Bachchan and Aishwarya Rai; Mansoor Ali Khan Pataudi (cricketer) and Sharmila Tagore; Dharmendra and Hema Malini; Saif Ali Khan and Kareena Kapoor.

Polly Vernon of the British newspaper The Guardian summed up her analysis of what makes a celebrity supercouple in her May 25, 2000 article:

The basic appeal of the accomplished supercouple can be reduced to this: by hooking up with another, carefully selected celeb, you can eliminate your bad points, compensate for your own shortcomings, and hint at a softer, more vulnerable side. Attach yourself to someone smarter, prettier, more fashionable, hipper, funnier than you are, and you will automatically acquire these missing qualities by osmosis. They, equally, will benefit from your particular brand of star quality. Your public perception will become more complete, more exciting. Together, you are quite literally, the ultimate individual.

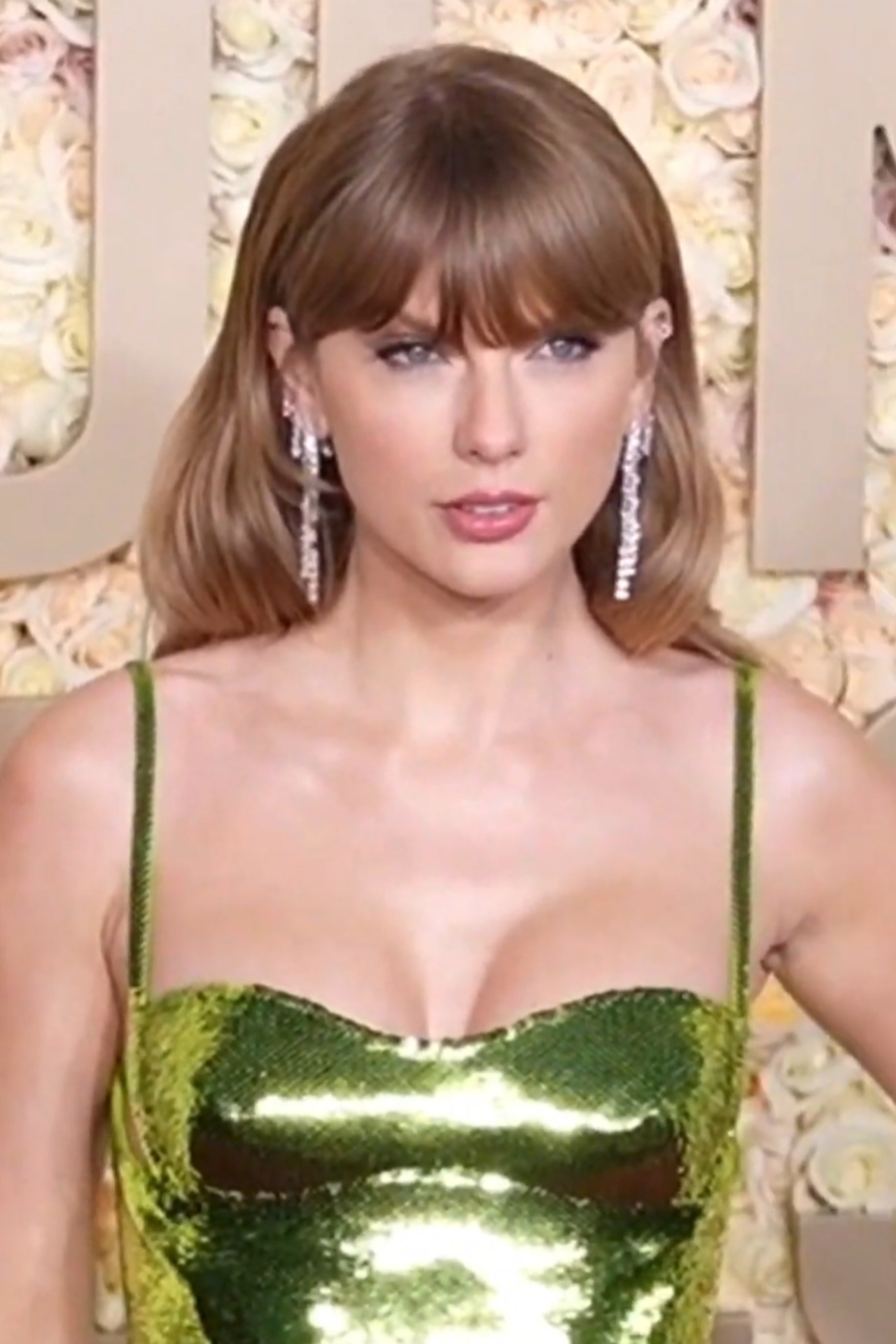
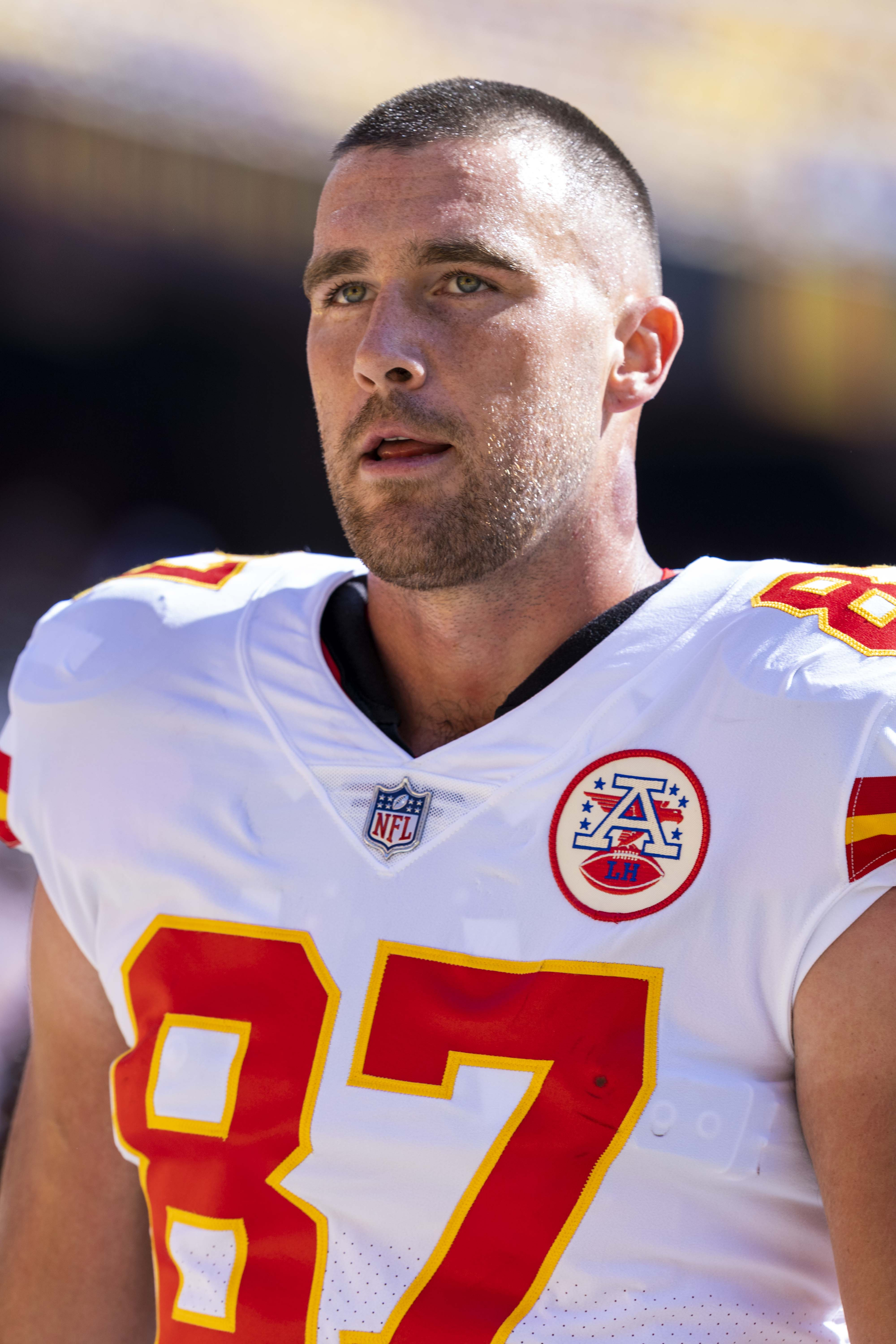
The relationship of Taylor Swift and Travis Kelce attracted significant media attention, with several publications deeming them a supercouple.

In 2023, American singer-songwriter Taylor Swift and football player Travis Kelce began dating, leading media publications to call them a supercouple and "America's royal couple". Billboard's Hannah Dailey opined that Swift and Kelce "are arguably the world's most high-profile couple right now, consistently making headlines on the daily for simply holding hands or enjoying dinner together." The NFL viewership increased dramatically; a Chiefs–Bears game that Swift attended drew the most television viewers of the weekend, while sales of Kelce's jersey and Chiefs game tickets surged. The NFL and NBC used the relationship for social media content and to promote subsequent games. A Chiefs–Jets game that Swift attended averaged 27 million viewers, making it the most-watched Sunday-night television show since Super Bowl LVII. A number of couples dressed up as Swift and Kelce as part of 2023 Halloween. A television special about the relationship and its impact, titled Taylor + Travis, was released on Hulu in November 2023. Andrew Unterbeger of Billboard wrote that Swift and Kelce's romance resulted in a "near-100% public approval" because "it just felt right: the All-American athlete dating the All-American pop star." The couple announced their engagement in August 2025, and got married on July 3rd 2026.

== Video games ==
Video game creators have realized the asset of incorporating supercouple romances within their products by stringing together epic stories of love and intrigue. While writing epic romances into video games is not a new phenomenon, the idea of capturing a video game player through emotionally charged moments via the death of a hero's lover in order to produce feelings of attachment to the fictional environment has expanded, especially within action-adventure/role-playing games (RPGs). The goal is to make the gamer actually become emotionally invested in the characters and their actions, ultimately resulting in heightened gaming experience. Video game designer Peter Molyneux, when speaking of the main component he wanted in his game Fable 2, spoke of more than just the romantic aspect, stating, "We want you to feel loved. You can have sex and you can have a baby. That baby will grow up and will kind of look like you."

In the early days of gaming, the idea of love and romance was used as little more than a plot point to urge the hero to complete the set of tasks put before him. Mario, hero of the Super Mario series of games, has Princess Peach to rescue from the main villain. Link and Princess Zelda from The Legend of Zelda made gamers wonder why the two were not romantically together while rooting for the couple. Double Dragon features the protagonist Billy Lee, as he attempts to rescue his girlfriend (Maria) from his evil twin brother (Jimmy), leader of a sinister street gang. This era of game-playing was not well known for equal opportunity in gender roles.

Eventually, video games grew to become a respectable and rich source of storytelling. "Larger disk space, greater production staffs, and more impressive budgets allowed more fleshed out characters, more elaborate plot points, and greater instances of interaction between characters." The genre that benefited from this the most is the role-playing medium. The medium made romantic themes a prominent element of its story-telling, which became one of its staples. This subplot is featured through the exploits of supercouples, the primary pair of lovers.

"Usually, the 'supercouple' turns out to be the main hero and heroine of the game, though this is not always the case." The Lunar series, for example, has become famous for creating several romantic pairings from the hero's party in addition to the hero and heroine. In a role-playing plot, often the romantic feelings the characters feel for one another somehow becomes entwined with the main plot itself. In Grandia, Justin, the main character, is compelled to fight against seemingly insurmountable odds in order to rescue the girl that he is in love with. In Tales of Legendia, the romantic feelings Shirley Fennes has for main character and brother-in-law Senel Coolidge is a focus of the game, even though the latter seems oblivious of the former's true feelings even after they are accidentally engaged in the ending of the primary story mode. "When the love between the supercouple somehow becomes threatened by the machinations of the antagonist, the heroes fight back with everything they have and usually prove, once and for all, that 'love conquers all'."

The Compilation of Final Fantasy VII has several notable couples, such as Cloud Strife and his relationships with childhood friend Tifa Lockhart and flower girl Aerith Gainsborough. Cloud and Aerith have been called video games' greatest, as well as its most tragic, star-crossed love story. The couple is also one of the most well-known video game couples in the history of video gaming. In 2005, Electronic Gaming Monthly stated that without the game, "Aeris wouldn't have died, and gamers wouldn't have learned how to cry".

Other popular couples from the Final Fantasy games include Squall Leonhart and Rinoa Heartilly from Final Fantasy VIII, Zidane Tribal and Garnet til Alexandros from Final Fantasy IX, Tidus and Yuna from Final Fantasy X, Vincent Valentine and his lost love Lucrecia Crescent, Zack Fair and Aerith Gainsborough in the Final Fantasy VII prequel Crisis Core: Final Fantasy VII, Snow Villiers and Serah Farron from Final Fantasy XIII, and Cecil Harvey and Rosa Farrell from Final Fantasy IV.

Love stories such as Solid Snake and Meryl Silverburgh (from Metal Gear Solid), which takes on more of a subtle approach, and couples defined more by their conflicts than their happiness, have also impacted the gaming industry. Video game insiders state that the need for these love stories within the gaming realm is valid and is a great addition to the gaming experience in most cases.

== Literature and toys ==
Romantic and tragic themes found in modern supercouple stories have often been borrowed from classic literary couples. Romeo and Juliet, due to their enduring legacy and popularity, are considered an ideal supercouple outline for aspects of forbidden or tragic love, and the relationship between Antony and Cleopatra has been described as fitting the power-couple trope.

In the genres of toys and comic books, toys were given their first prominent supercouple with the creation of Ken and Barbie by Mattel, in 1961, and comic book supercouples such as Superman and Lois Lane (created in 1938), and Peter Parker and Mary Jane Watson (created in 1966) are still popular today.

== See also ==
- Bennifer
- Love team
- Sonny & Cher
- Ike & Tina Turner
