= Faith Newman =

- The Young and the Restless character
- Portrayed by: Lutsky twins (2009–2011); Madison & Brynn Bowie (2011); Alyvia Alyn Lind (2011–2021); Mckenna Grace (2013–2015); Reylynn Caster (2021–present)
- Duration: 2009–present
- First appearance: September 30, 2009
- Created by: Maria Arena Bell, Hogan Sheffer and Scott Hamner
- Introduced by: Maria Arena Bell and Paul Rauch (2009, 2011); Anthony Morina and Josh Griffith (2021)
In-universe information
- Other names: Faith Colleen Newman; Faith Cassidy Newman
- Occupation: Heiress; Student
- Family: Newman
- Father: Nicholas Newman
- Mother: Sharon Newman
- Brothers: Noah Newman
- Half-brothers: Christian Newman (legal)
- Half-sisters: Cassie Newman; Mariah Copeland; Summer Newman
- Grandparents: Victor Newman; Nikki Newman; Doris Collins
- Aunts and uncles: Dylan McAvoy; Victoria Newman; John Abbott III; Adam Newman; Abby Newman
- Nephews: Harrison Abbott (adoptive)
- Nieces: Aria Porter-Copeland (adoptive)
- First cousins: Claire Grace; Reed Hellstrom; Johnny Abbott (adoptive); Connor Newman; Katie Newman; Christian Newman; Dominic Abbott Newman Chancellor

Faith Newman is a fictional character in the American CBS soap opera The Young and the Restless. She is currently portrayed by Reylynn Caster, who assumed the role following the departure of Alyvia Alyn Lind, who played Faith for almost ten years from 2011 to 2021. Introduced during the September 30, 2009, episode, Faith is the youngest daughter of supercouple Nick and Sharon Newman.

== Storylines ==
Faith is conceived during an affair between Sharon Abbott (Sharon Case) and Nick Newman (Joshua Morrow). Her paternity is initially in question, with Nick, Jack Abbott (Peter Bergman), and Billy Abbott (Billy Miller) as the possible fathers; a paternity test confirms Nick as Faith's father. Moments after Sharon gives birth to Faith while institutionalized at Fairview Sanitarium, she is kidnapped by Nick's brother Adam Newman (Michael Muhney), who passes her off as Ashley Abbott's (Eileen Davidson) child and leads Sharon to believe her baby died. Adam's deceit is revealed months later, after Sharon had befriended and married him, and Faith is reunited with her biological parents. Sharon and Faith become trapped in a barn during a tornado, and when the barn's beams start to collapse, Adam saves Faith's life by shielding her from the falling beams. Nick later deems Sharon an unfit mother due to her continued involvement with Adam, and successfully obtains full custody of Faith. Sharon is presumed dead after going on the run from the police, having been falsely convicted for the murder of Skye Newman (Laura Stone). After being found alive, Sharon is sentenced to thirty years in prison. Ashley offers to watch Faith several times for Nick, which brings the two of them closer. Faith's brother Noah Newman (Robert Adamson) encourages Nick to bring Faith to visit Sharon in prison, which he reluctantly agrees to do. Sharon reunites with Faith after she is acquitted, and they go to New Mexico together on vacation.

Sharon suffers a nervous breakdown and is diagnosed with bipolar disorder, leaving Nick as Faith's sole carer for several months. The following year, Sharon takes advantage of Faith's disapproval of Nick's girlfriend (and eventual fiancée) Avery Bailey Clark (Jessica Collins), in hopes of undermining Nick and Avery's relationship. Meanwhile, Faith forms a bond with Dylan McAvoy (Steve Burton), who turns out to be Nick's half-brother. Nick and Sharon become engaged again, and Faith meets her sister, Mariah Copeland (Camryn Grimes). The engagement ends when Nick learns that Sharon (while off her medication) had tampered with a DNA test and led him to believe that he was not the father of Summer Newman (Hunter King). Another custody dispute ensues between Nick and Sharon, with Nick using Sharon's mental health struggles to win full custody of Faith. After reverting to joint custody, their relationship turns hostile again when it is revealed that Sharon had been raising what was believed to be Nick's son, Christian Newman (Jamie and Alister Tobias), as her own child with Dylan. Faith runs away from home due to the conflict between her parents. When presented with the chance to return to her parents' shared custody arrangement, Faith rejects both of them, deciding to live with her grandparents instead. The following year, Faith grows resentful at Nick's new relationship with Chelsea Lawson (Melissa Claire Egan). She also witnesses Sharon's boyfriend Scotty Grainger (Daniel Hall) kissing her aunt Abby Newman (Melissa Ordway).

Faith moves away from Genoa City to attend boarding school. Upon returning, she learns that Sharon has been diagnosed with breast cancer, and begins to misbehave at school. After a story about Adam's criminal history is published, which discloses Faith's kidnapping to the public, Faith is cyber-bullied. She befriends Jordan (Madison Thompson), who influences her to drink while underage. Faith learns that Jordan had been sending her text messages as a secret admirer named Tommy. Faith then takes off in a truck, which she ends up crashing; Adam finds Faith and brings her to the hospital. When Faith is diagnosed with acute interstitial nephritis and requires a kidney transplant, Adam is found to be a match for Faith's rare blood type, and donates his kidney to her.

== Development ==
=== Casting and creation ===
The character was introduced on September 30, 2009. As an infant, Faith was played by the Lutsky twins from 2009 to 2011. Beginning 2011, child actress Alyvia Alyn Lind, the daughter of American actress Barbara Alyn Woods, stepped into the role of Faith at the age of three. In June 2013, due to schedule conflicts, the role was recast with Mckenna Grace. Sharon Case, who plays Faith's mother Sharon Newman, described Grace as "not nervous at all," noting her to be "very confident" with a "big personality". In May 2014, Lind returned to the role. In December 2014, Grace started temporarily filling in for Lind, while Lind was filming a pilot for TNT.

Lind continued taking breaks from playing Faith over the years due to other projects, while stating in 2020: "There was one point when I was going off for some movie and by the time I was finished with that, we weren’t positive I would come back to Y&R and it was seriously the hardest thing for me to take. I just couldn’t imagine leaving this family." Lind added her role on the soap opera was "the most stable thing" in her life. The character was said to be attending boarding school while Lind was absent for several months before returning in December 2019.

In March 2021, it was announced Lind was departing The Young and the Restless after being cast in a leading role on the television series Chucky. This left the series' producers in a "casting conundrum," due to Faith being a "pivotal character in a front-burner storyline" at the time. Lind's final episode aired on April 7, 2021, and she was replaced by actress Reylynn Caster, who took over the role on April 12, 2021. Caster's casting marked the first time Faith appears at "an adult-ish age". Caster thought that it was good for her to be "thrown into such a big storyline", stating that: "I had to force myself to get adjusted to everything quickly instead of gradually." Caster added portraying Faith "in this really scary point of her life" allowed her to connect with the character quickly.

=== Childhood ===
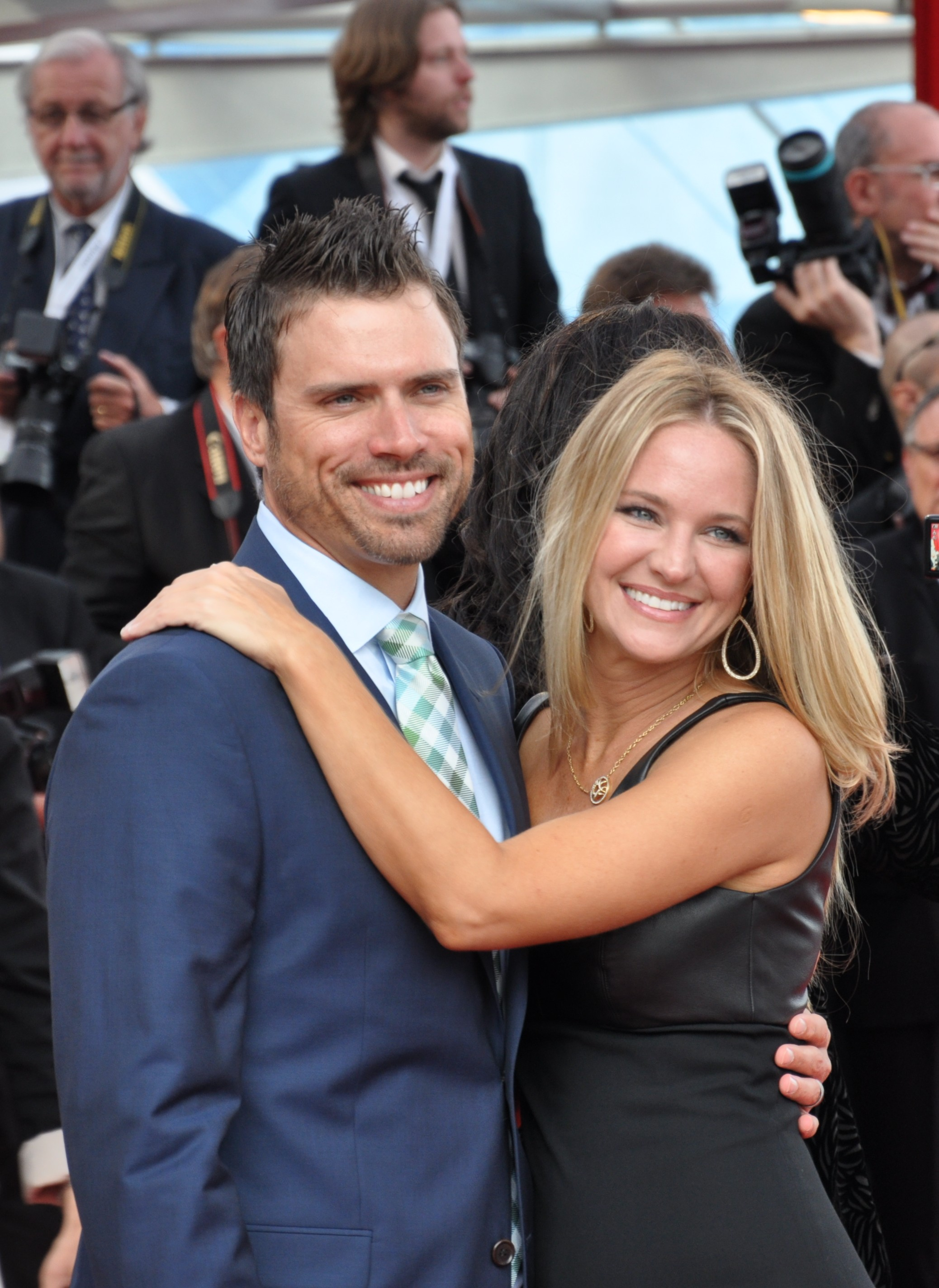
Faith's childhood is complicated by the custody battle between her parents, Nick and Sharon Newman (Joshua Morrow and Sharon Case, pictured).

Faith has been described as an "outspoken girl" who "has always had something to say about the new loves in her parents’ lives". As a child, she has particular disdain for the women her father Nick (Joshua Morrow) is involved with. Soap Opera Digest highlighted the character's "precociousness" as being evident from a very young age. Of the character, Lind has stated: "She’s had a tough life, but she’s always been surrounded by a supporting, loving family. And because of that love, she has always been a survivor." Faith's birth was prophesied by her older sister, Cassie (Camryn Grimes), on her deathbed. Given this, Sharon Case (Sharon) has characterized Faith as an "oracle-type character. She's an old soul, as Cassie was."

Throughout her childhood, Faith is the subject of a recurring custody dispute between her parents. As a result of Sharon's romantic involvement with Faith's kidnapper and uncle Adam Newman (then played by Michael Muhney), Nick deemed himself best-suited for custody. Faith has a strong connection with her grandfather Victor Newman (Eric Braeden), and at one point, opts to live with her grandparents due to her parents' custody war. Lind explained that Faith "realized that she had the power" in the scenes where she chooses to live with her grandparents, contrasting this with the usual writing for child characters: "Usually, in a scene with kids, writers are like, 'Have the kid come in, say, 'Hi, Mommy,' and then run out the door.' I’m so grateful to the writers because they always give me fun and cool storylines and make Faith seem wise beyond her years." According to Case, the decision to make Faith "very wise" was informed by the writers watching Lind.

=== Teenage angst ===
In 2020, Faith's kidnapping as a newborn by her uncle Adam (Mark Grossman) is revealed to the public, causing her to be cyber-bullied. Meanwhile, an older teen and "bad influence" Jordan (Madison Thompson) inspires Faith to sneak out to parties and drink. Lind stated that "Faith is turning into quite the delinquent", noting that she enjoyed playing Faith's rebellious side as the character had "always been a kind of goody two-shoes, so it’s great to play her dealing with becoming a teenager. She’s been going through a lot of stuff, although that doesn’t give her a pass to act out like she’s doing, but it’s really reflecting her pain." Canyon News noted that Faith was "spiraling" and "not so innocent anymore".

Head writer Josh Griffith noted that Faith's behavior worsens as she deals with the trauma of the bullying as well as Sharon's cancer diagnosis the previous year. Speaking of Faith's underage drinking, Lind thanked the writers for giving her "such a great storyline" and stated: "Nobody’s perfect and I loved being able to explore Faith’s dark side. And I’m not sure what’s in store for Faith, but I will always believe that deep down, she’s a good person with a good heart. She just strayed off her path for a beat." During this period, Faith opens up about her alcoholism to her grandmother Nikki (Melody Thomas Scott), due to the latter's own struggles with alcohol. After agreeing to receive help for her issues, Faith learns that the "mysterious texts" she had been receiving from a male admirer were actually from Jordan, who had been catfishing Faith in an effort to publicly humiliate her. In response, Faith runs off with alcohol and becomes involved in a car accident that "eerily" mirrors the fatal car crash that killed Cassie. Scott observed that "all of Faith’s parental figures feel a certain degree of helplessness. Since this form of bullying [catfishing] didn’t exist when they were young, it’s not something that most adults feel they can protect their children from." Scott added that the series was using the storyline to alert parents to the dangers of modern forms of bullying.

After Caster takes over the role, Faith displays her "forceful side" when she rejects Jordan's apology for the bullying. During this storyline, Faith forms a friendship with Moses Winters (Jacob Aaron Gaines), who defends her against bullies at school. Gaines explained that Moses has a "soft spot" for Faith and "won't let anyone push her around", with Canyon News highlighting a possible romance building between the two. Meanwhile, Caster described the twist in which Adam saves Faith's life twice, including by donating his kidney to her, as "very complicated" due to Faith's history with Adam. Caster stated that Faith "feels like she kind of owes him redemption. But also, she's a teenage girl who is still trying to figure out everything", describing Faith's relationship with Adam as something difficult for her to grasp.

== Reception ==
Lind received praise for her performance. In its "Best and Worst of 2014" issue, Soaps In Depth wrote that the actress is "good enough to bring to mind Camryn Grimes' early days as Cassie", while also commending the soap opera for "sensibly playing the youngster as what she is – a kid." For her portrayal, Lind was nominated for the Daytime Emmy Award for Outstanding Younger Actress in a Drama Series in 2017; at age nine, this made her one of the youngest soap opera actors to be nominated for a Daytime Emmy Award. That year, On-Air On-Soaps stated that Lind "can handle any material given to her" and that "her acting chops are well beyond her years." Devin Owens of Soap Opera Digest praised the "emotional nuances" Lind brought to the character, stating that she "delivered in spades" as Faith grew up and became more involved in dramatic storylines. Charlie Mason of Soaps.com also praised Lind's portrayal of Faith's "teenage angst". In April 2020, as Faith reacted to her mother's cancer diagnosis, Soaps In Depth praised the performances of Lind and Case as "powerful" and "heartwarming", writing that they "have always struck the perfect balance in their alter egos' mother-and-child relationship, but as they deal with these dark days, the actresses are shining ever brighter." At the 48th Daytime Emmy Awards in 2021, Lind was nominated for Outstanding Younger Performer in a Drama Series.

Lind's exit from the series was met with disappointment from fans, given that she had grown up on-screen. Janet Di Lauro of the online magazine Soap Hub praised Caster for "fitting into Lind's formidable shoes", stating that she "immediately grasped the character’s essence, connecting with her plight and problems. She’s never tried to do too much in her scenes, instead making her mark with understated performances that allowed viewers to feel her sorrow and embarrassment over Faith’s reckless acts." Di Lauro also spoke positively of Faith's friendship with Moses, finding their banter "real and believable".

Jim Halterman of TV Insider called it a "typically juicy soap opera twist" when Faith needs a kidney transplant and "the one candidate to help save her life with a kidney donation is none other than Adam". However, Canyon News criticized this twist and the writers' efforts to "humanize" Adam, writing: "I mean how many times can Adam be touted as the rescuer for Sharon, Nick and Faith Newman notably?", noting that Adam had already saved Faith twice before.
