= Nick and Sharon =

- The Young and the Restless character
- Joshua Morrow and Sharon Case as Nicholas and Sharon Newman
- Duration: 1994–2010; 2013–14; 2018
- Created by: William J. Bell
- Introduced by: William J. Bell; Edward J. Scott
In-universe information
- Other names: Shick
- Family: Newman
- Spouse: 1995; 1996–2007
- Children: Cassie Newman; Noah Newman; Faith Newman

Nicholas and Sharon Newman are fictional characters and a supercouple from the CBS soap opera The Young and the Restless. Nick is portrayed by Joshua Morrow and Sharon is portrayed by Sharon Case. The characters of Nick and Sharon first met in 1994 and soon became involved. They were faced with a range of problems, such as their different levels of class, Sharon's ex-boyfriend Matt Clark, and Sharon's secret past: she was pregnant three years earlier and gave up the child, Cassie, for adoption. The couple married in February 1996, and after having a son, Noah, Sharon was reunited with Cassie. Nick grew to love Cassie and became her adoptive father. Sharon's best friend Grace Turner developed an obsession with Nick and had sex with him twice. In the following years, the couple dealt with the return of Matt Clark and infidelity on both sides among other obstacles, which Nick and Sharon managed to eventually move past.

In 2005, Cassie was killed off in a car accident, which led to Nick's affair with Phyllis Summers. Nick impregnated Phyllis, who gave birth to a daughter named Summer, which ultimately meant the end of Nick and Sharon's marriage. Despite Nick's marriage to Phyllis and Sharon's marriages to Jack Abbott and Nick's brother Adam Newman, Nick and Sharon's pattern of periodically getting back together and breaking up continued. A 2009 affair (while both were still married to others) resulted in the birth of another daughter, Faith.

The couple's marriage lasted for over ten years, which is considered a rarity in the soap opera genre. The couple is often referred to by the portmanteau "Shick" by fans on social media, message boards and in magazines. The Huffington Post and Soap Opera Digest named them one of soap opera's greatest supercouples. Their 2009 on-screen reunion was a high-profile event on the show which garnered media attention, while lifting the show's ratings by nearly half a million viewers.

== Casting ==
Nick was born on-screen on the episode dated December 31, 1988. In 1994, his birth-date was revised to December 31, 1976, when Joshua Morrow began playing the role. Sharon was initially portrayed by Monica Potter and later Heidi Mark, before Case took over four months into the character's duration. Case was cast as Sharon Collins following a screen test with Morrow, with several other actresses also being screen tested. Morrow said: "They had all these beautiful actresses come in and Sharon was clearly 'The Sharon'! (...) I said, 'She is definitely the best of all of them.' Now my word didn’t mean anything back then, as I was just a kid off the bus from Oklahoma."

== History ==
=== Teenage years (1994–96) ===
Eighteen-year-old Nicholas "Nick" Newman, son of the rich business tycoon Victor Newman (Eric Braeden) and his ex-wife Nikki Abbott (Melody Thomas Scott), met Sharon Collins, a student from modest means who recently relocated from Madison, Wisconsin to Genoa City. Although it was "love at first sight", Nick was dating Amy Wilson (Julianne Morris) and Sharon was dating Matt Clark (Eddie Cibrian). However, they soon broke off their other relations and became a couple. Nikki did not approve of Sharon and her mother Doris Colins (Karen Hensel) because of their lower class status. Nick became increasingly angry at the pressure from his family to break up with Sharon, although Victor fully accepted Sharon. Nick dreamed of running away and eloping with Sharon, but Sharon refused because of the high class status of the Newman family. Matt became extremely jealous of Nick and Sharon, and although he began dating Amy, began scheming to break them up. Matt investigated Sharon's past and found out her deepest secret which she was keeping from Nick; she lost her virginity to her high-school boyfriend from Madison, Frank Barritt (Phil Dozois), which resulted in a pregnancy. Sharon gave her baby up for adoption, unable to provide for it. Nick believed it was a lie and that Sharon was a virgin, and confronted Matt at the Crimson Lights coffeehouse. It turned into a physical altercation in which Nick was badly beaten by Matt. Eventually, Nick and Sharon broke up after he discovered about her lies. Unable to stay apart, Nick and Sharon reunited within weeks. However, Matt became enraged and trapped Sharon in his car where he raped her. Traumatized and humiliated, Sharon kept the rape to herself.

Nick and Sharon decided to elope. However, on their first night together, Sharon pulled away from having sex with Nick and finally confessed that she was raped by Matt. Nick ran to confront Matt at his apartment, only to discover Matt lying in a pool of blood having been shot. Nick's DNA was found on the gun and he was arrested. Victor hired Paul Williams (Doug Davidson) and a range of attorneys to free Nick, who had to go to trial for attempted murder. Nick was found guilty and sent to jail, where he spent Christmas of 1995. However, in February 1996 he was acquitted when Amy came forward as the actual shooter after Matt tried to rape her. Amy was in seclusion after recovering from mental trauma. Matt skipped town after he became in trouble for lying in court, claiming he remembered Nick shooting him. Nick and Sharon then married.

=== Marriage and parenthood (1997–99) ===
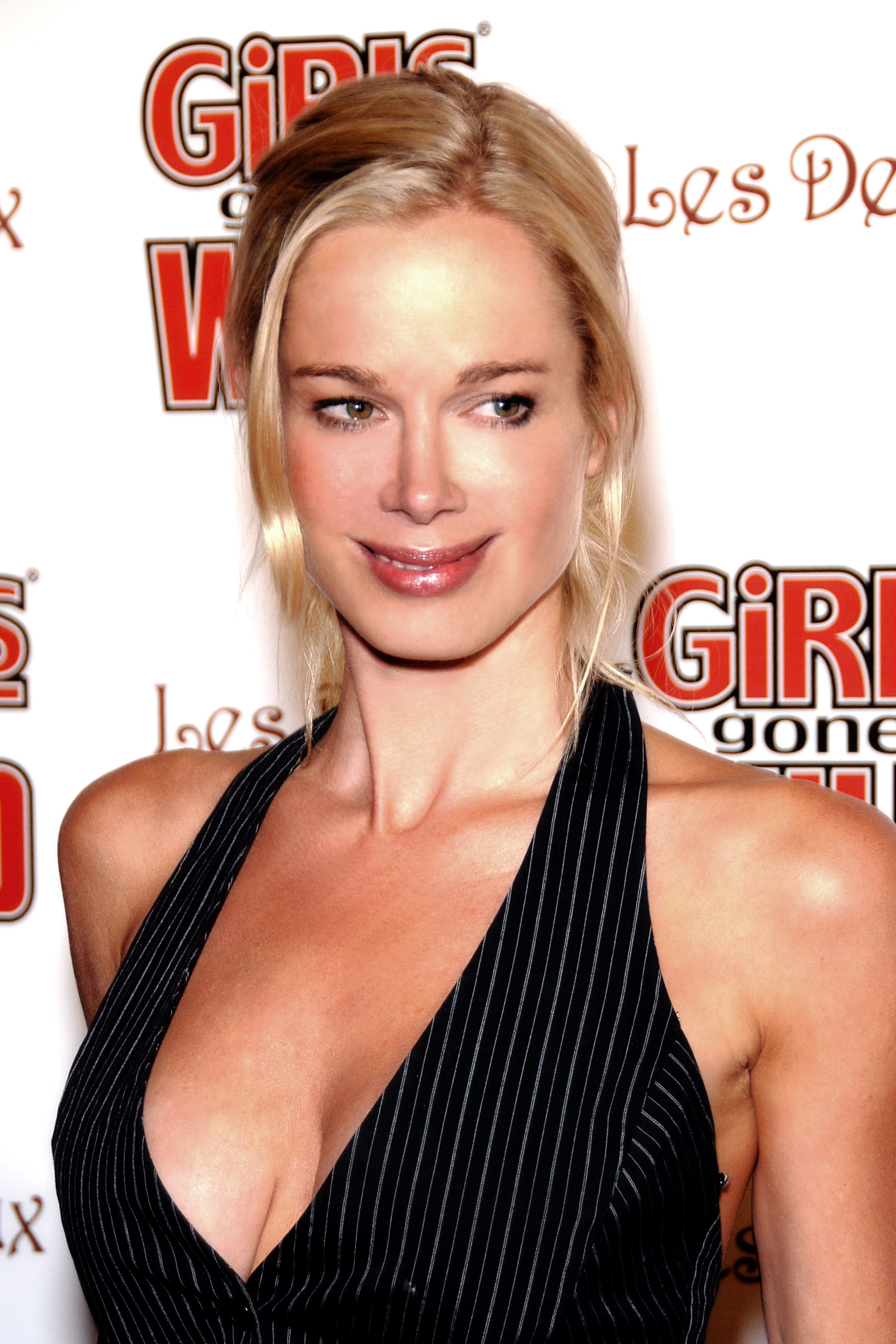
Jennifer Gareis (pictured) played Grace, Sharon's best friend who schemed to break the couple up.

At the beginning of her marriage to Nick, Sharon became insecure and felt like she had to have a child so that Nick would stay tied to her. During this period, Nick hired Sharon's best friend from Madison Grace Turner (Josie Davis) to work at his father's company Newman Enterprises. Sharon became pregnant by deliberately skipping her contraceptive pills, which she confessed to Nikki. Nick asked Sharon to have an abortion. Without his permission, she arranged to have an abortion to save her marriage. However, at the last minute, Nick realized he was wrong and stopped it from happening. Grace's old boyfriend Tony Viscardi (Nick Scotti) arrived in town but she resisted him because she began having fantasies about Nick. Their firstborn baby son Noah Christian Newman was born prematurely on March 3, 1997 after Sharon fell. Noah became ill and nearly died. Believing he would eventually die, Grace (now played by Jennifer Gareis) and Tony tracked down Sharon's long lost eight-year-old daughter Cassie (Camryn Grimes) and brought her to town, believing it would help Sharon get through Noah's death. However, once Noah survived, Grace kept Cassie so she could raise her as her own, as her "pet". She did this despite knowing very well Sharon was definitely Cassie's biological mother. Nick became drunk one night after partying with his college friends, the same night Sharon was sick with a cold and Grace was babysitting Noah. Nick entered the nursery and had sex with Grace who he believed was Sharon, leaving him guilt-ridden after he found out it wasn't.

Sharon eventually found out Cassie was her daughter and Cassie came to live with her and Nick at their home, a refurbished cottage on the Newman Ranch. Despite Grace's engagement to Tony, she continued to dream about Nick and wanted to take him away from his family. During a trip to Denver, Nick cheated on Sharon with Grace after drinking, despite him claiming their relationship was only "professional". Sharon left Nick afterwards, feeling like a fool.

Nick and Sharon remained apart for a number of months. However, they worked together in court to legally adopt Cassie as their own. Nick moved back into the family home, Case explained "Neither knew what the other wanted. So, Sharon went to bed and Nick slept on the couch." During this time, they reconnected and eventually got back together, as Nick grew even closer to Cassie as his own daughter. The show's then head-writer at the time Kay Alden, said "This has been a long time coming for Sharon and Nick [...] For the last several months, there's been a lot of stop-and-go — and mixed messages — between them. But now the feelings they have for each other are definitely clear." Sharon and Nick were awarded custody of Cassie, and Nick adopted Cassie and became her father. Joshua Morrow stated: "Nick has accepted Cassie as his daughter. He loves her as much as he loves Noah. She's an incredible child and Nick is crazy about her". Of their reunion, Case said: "Happiness doesn't just mean lying around in bed saying, 'I love you' everyday for the rest of their lives. Love expresses itself in other ways. One way is getting over the hurdles of life together. So, I'm sure they will be more hurdles to come." Describing Nick's redemption after his infidelity, Case said: "Every time Sharon sees Nick take control, she feels like he's her knight in shining armor. After what happened between Nick and Grace, Nick really needed to prove himself for Sharon to feel better about what happened. Now, time has passed and he has redeemed himself. Nick didn't want to be a father — and look at him now."

=== Infidelities, Cassie's death and divorce (2000–06) ===
Matt Clark was re-introduced by Rick Hearst (pictured) under the identity Carter Mills, having undergone severe plastic surgery.

In 2000, Nick and Sharon experienced a health scare when Cassie nearly had tuberculosis, but ended up being okay. The couple became the new owners of the Crimson Lights coffeehouse, their teenage hang-out spot. Having undergone severe cosmetic surgery, Matt Clark (now played by Rick Hearst) returned to Genoa City under the fake identity 'Carter Mills' and began working at the coffeehouse where he schemed with Larry Warton (David "Shark" Fralick) to frame Nick for selling drugs. Matt became a "beloved" employee and Sharon invited him over to the ranch, where he attempted to drug and date rape her but failed. His plan to have Nick thrown in jail worked, and he lured Sharon to an isolated cabin where he nearly raped her until help showed up and he ran. Matt was driven off a cliff in a car driven by the unstable Tricia Dennison (Sabryn Genet). A dying Matt told Nick that he raped Sharon, and later pulled out his own ventilator and framed Nick for his death; Nick was arrested again but eventually freed. Sharon became pregnant and Nick believed it was Matt's child, and wanted her to give it up for adoption. They argued, causing Sharon to fall and give birth to a stillborn baby-girl which was later confirmed through DNA testing to be, in fact, Nick's child. They drifted apart and the marriage began to breakdown. Sharon became hostile towards Nick, resenting him, and she left him. Months later, they came close to a reunion. Sharon mistakenly believed Nick had sex with Grace again, so she had sex with the Newman handyman, Diego Guittierez (Greg Vaughan). Angry, Nick assaulted Diego and had sex with Grace, which he immediately regretted. Sharon and Nick spent the Christmas of 2002 together for the sake of the kids, but once it was finished, Sharon realized she needed to move on and decided to file for divorce.

In 2003, realizing he needs to fix his marriage, Nick goes to give Sharon flowers but is shocked when he sees Victor kissing Sharon. Humiliated, Sharon leaves town. During this time, Sharon Case was absent for months due to lengthy contract negotiations which left her fate on the show in question. She eventually struck a deal with the producers and returned, after being off-screen from February 17 to May 1. Instead of having the character depart fully or be killed off, executive producer at the time David Shaughnessy chose to have her leave town. While away, Sharon became depressed and on the verge of suicide. During her absence, Cassie nearly dies after falling into an icy pond, and resented Sharon upon her return. Sharon was confronted with her past when a man who she had sex with and who later abused her while she was out of town, Cameron Kirsten (Linden Ashby), came to town with intent of having sex with her; as well as Cassie's biological father Frank arriving in town. He attacks her on New Year's Eve and she throws a bottle at him; Sharon believes that she murdered Cameron. However, he turned out to be alive; Cameron killed Frank and used his dead body to make Sharon believe it was his corpse. Case praised the storyline as one of her favorite, feeling that Sharon was still a hero; stating: "Your romantic lead shouldn't just be a simple romantic lead. Sharon was that for a long time. She was in this love story with Nick and nothing really happened to her. You can only carry that so far." Sharon and Nick was finally solid in their marriage again, after two years of tumultuous events.

In 2005, 14-year-old Cassie was killed in a car accident after attempting to drive drunken Daniel Romalotti (Michael Graziadei) home. Nick became distant from Sharon, causing Sharon to become close to Brad Carlton (Don Diamont), who she worked with while being a spokesperson for Newman Enterprises' Beauty of Nature cosmetics line. Nick also inched closer to a co-worker, Phyllis Summers (Michelle Stafford). Sharon and Brad shared a kiss, but she confessed it to Nick, wanting to work on her marriage. However, Nick was having an affair with Phyllis. When Sharon failed to commit to him, Brad proposed to Nick's sister Victoria Newman (Amelia Heinle) instead. Sharon was furious when she found out about Nick's affair with Phyllis. Despite this, the couple remained together and eventually decided to stay married. Phyllis became pregnant with Nick's child. Sharon asked Nick for a divorce and they ended their marriage; he moved on and married Phyllis. In December 2006, Nick and Phyllis welcomed a baby girl, Summer Newman.

=== Love triangles and Faith's birth (2007–10) ===
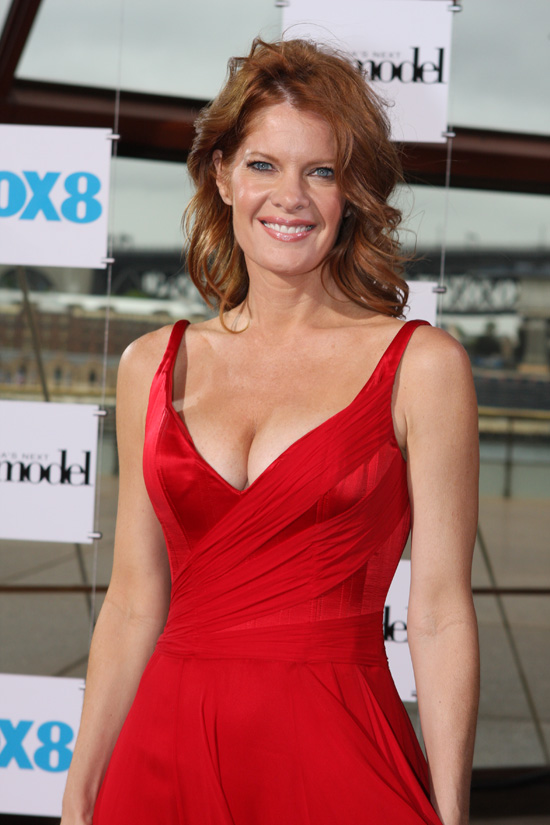
Following the end of his marriage to Sharon, Nick married his former mistress Phyllis, who was played by Michelle Stafford (pictured).

After her divorce from Nick and his marriage to Phyllis, Sharon moved on by marrying a rival to the Newman family, Jack Abbott (Peter Bergman). Bergman said that it was "only appropriate" that the couple found each other, explaining: "Wherever Sharon goes, she is embarrassed. Will Phyllis come walking around the corner? But Sharon doesn't have any reason to be embarrassed with Jack." However, Bergman also noted that Jack's intamicy with her "all happens so quickly" which could indicate he was up to something manipulative. Case praised the marriage as being a good representation of modern-day marriages. Additionally, she felt that Sharon had "lost her identity" after divorcing Nick and Cassie's death, and found a new one in her marriage to Jack. Nick and Sharon remained close despite their separate marriages. In 2007, Nick ended up in a plane crash, losing his memory. When he returned, he thought it was 2005, believing he was married to Sharon and Cassie was alive. He even kissed Sharon; but regained his memory and returned to Phyllis and their infant daughter, Summer. Phyllis became jealous of Sharon's place in Nick's life, prompting her to write an article in their magazine Restless Style, in which she described Sharon as a "needy" "gum-chewing twit" who twirls her hair. Nick was angry at Phyllis for berating the mother of his children, although it was evident that he still loved Sharon and was protective of her. Stafford said: "He [Nick] Freaks. She wrote this scathing thing. But Nick says it's not appropriate for her to go after the mother of his son like that,"

In January 2009, Sharon went to the Abbott cabin to have time for herself after the breakdown of her marriage to Jack. Nick showed up because Noah was ice-skating and fell, suffering hypothermia. After becoming trapped in the cabin during a blizzard, Nick found a letter Sharon wrote to him (but didn't intend to show him) which professed her undying love for him. He confronted her and they had sex. Prior to this, Brad had come to the cabin to profess his love for Sharon. On his way out, he ended up dying by saving Noah from the ice. Discussing the plot, Case said that Sharon wants Nick "more than anyone" but would only have him under "certain terms" which includes him leaving Phyllis. Additionally, she said that she wouldn't want Nick and Sharon reunite if there wasn't any conflict. That April, they were at the cabin again searching for Noah and ended up having sex, resulting in Sharon becoming pregnant. During an interview with The Daily News Case said that Nick constantly changing his mind whether to be with Sharon or Phyllis "throws everything into a spin" and causes Sharon to make her decisions "all over again because she has new information". Also weighing in on the reunion, Morrow told TV Guide: "The fans have wanted this for a long time [...] it is going to be a very messy journey getting these two back together as a solid couple, but I am sure it will happen." Sharon briefly lied about the baby's paternity because of Summer becoming ill, and stated that Jack was the father. The truth came out, but Faith "died" at birth, Nick and Sharon grieved the loss of their child.

In reality, Faith was stolen by Nick's brother Adam Newman (Michael Muhney), who gave her to Ashley Abbott (Eileen Davidson) to raise as her own after he caused Ashley to miscarry. Without knowledge of this, Sharon romanced and married Adam. After reuniting with Faith, Nick and Sharon grew even closer. Nick and Phyllis broke up and got a divorce, leading him to reunite with Sharon. He proposed to her, and she accepted. However, Sharon could not get Adam out of her head and had sex with him in New Orleans. Nick left Sharon after she cheated, and she began to devote her time to get charges against Adam for the murder of his ex-wife Skye Lockhart (Laura Stone).

=== Reunion and custody battles (2011–15) ===
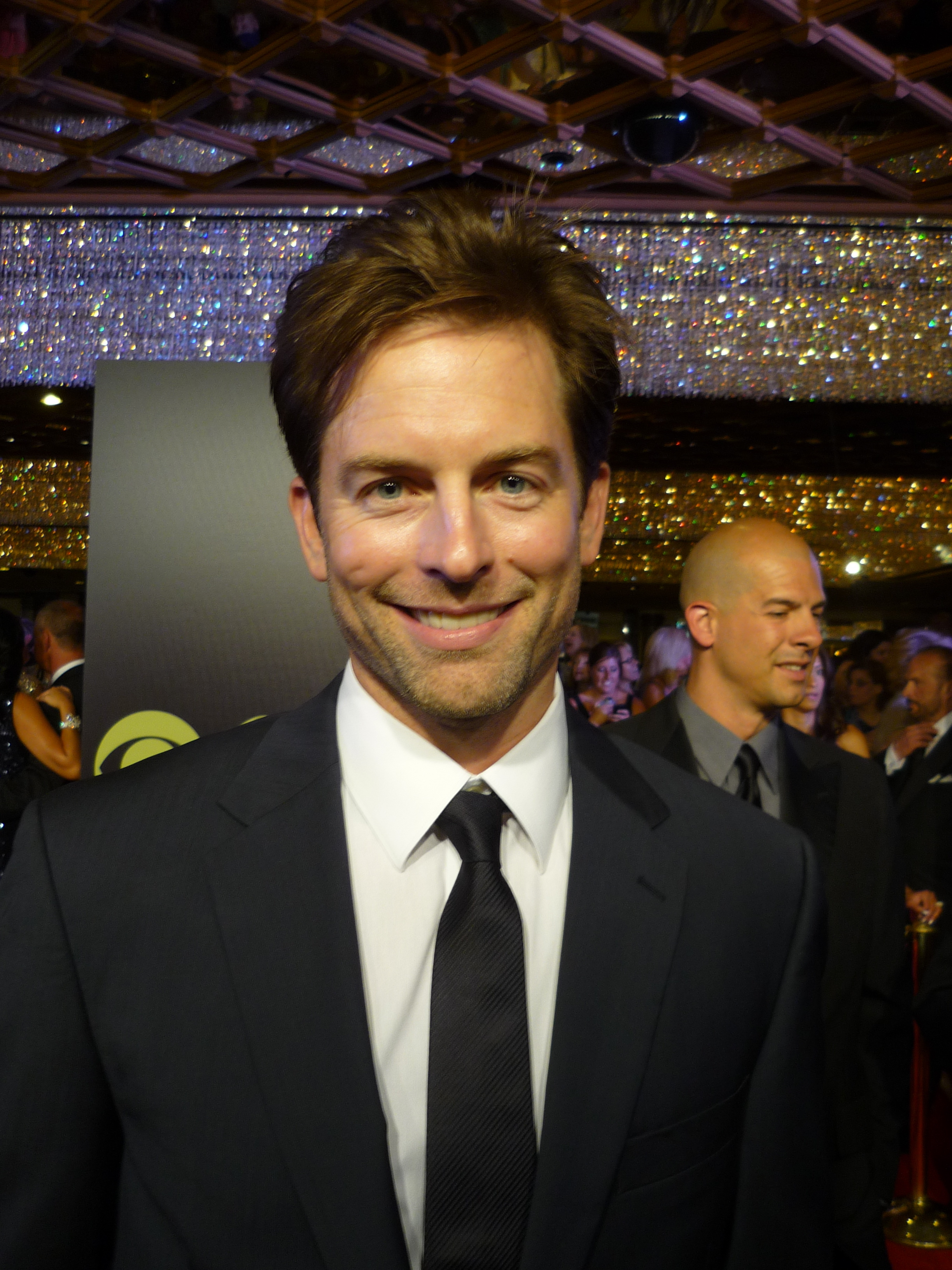
Michael Muhney (pictured) played Nick's half brother Adam, who began a relationship with Sharon after kidnapping Nick and Sharon's baby.

In the process of trying to save Adam from being sent to jail for Skye's death, Sharon tracks down Skye in Hawaii; Skye falls into a volcano and dies. Sharon loses custody of Faith to Nick, who won't accept her relationship with Adam. Sharon is arrested and sentenced to life imprisonment for her murder; she later skips town and poses under the identity 'Sheri Coleman' for months in New Mexico. During this time, Genoa City believed her dead, leaving Nick devastated. Nick had brief romances with Phyllis and his former step-mother Diane Jenkins (Maura West). Sharon eventually returned to town alive and was acquitted. Throughout 2011, Case voiced her support of Sharon being paired with Adam. Commenting on whether Nick and Sharon were "over", Case said she doesn't think they "will ever be over", and they aren't on right now because of her romance with Adam. In January 2012, Sharon regained joint custody of Faith. She also married Victor in a storyline which saw him disappear; and she took over the family company, Newman Enterprises. Nick and Victoria tried to stop Sharon's explosive run as CEO of Newman but failed; at one point, Nick went up against Sharon at the courts. Victor eventually returned and made sure Sharon paid. After heavily drinking, Sharon burned down the main-house at the Newman ranch. Nick forgave Sharon after it was revealed she was suffering from bipolar disorder during the time she did all those things. After two years of being bitter towards one another, Nick and Sharon began co-parenting again and he has vowed to be there for her, so that she can't turn to Adam for support again. Around this time, Morrow stated that as an actor he did not know "how in the world" the writers could reunite Nick and Sharon "anytime" soon, but stated: "I truly believe in my heart they belong together." Discussing who Sharon's "true love" is, Case stated: "Nick came first, so maybe that would hold more weight. But her love for Adam is just as deep."

In mid 2013, a mentally fragile Sharon began feeling nostalgic regarding her relationship with Nick, having been dumped by Adam. In a twist, it is revealed that the original paternity test conducted years earlier to determine whether Summer (now aged to 18 years old) was fathered by Jack or Nick was inconclusive; Nick claimed paternity over Summer, wanting another daughter following Cassie's death. When Summer became involved with Jack's son Kyle Abbott (Hartley Sawyer)—her possible half brother—Nick conducted another paternity DNA test. Sharon learned of this, and switched the results, to make everyone believe Nick wasn't Summer's father, so that she could comfort and win him back. A fight between Phyllis and Sharon (after Phyllis overheard Sharon confessing to switching the results) ended with Phyllis falling down a flight of stairs and into a coma. Speaking of these events Case stated: "Sharon really does feel justified in what she is doing. In fact, she feels she is doing what needs to be done. She feels that hers and Nick’s destinies, and Cassie’s destiny, and everyone’s life was compromised by Phyllis having this baby, because Nick and Phyllis had an affair, and Nick wanted to get back with Sharon." Sharon then began plotting to win her "high school sweetheart" back from his fiancé, Phyllis's sister Avery Bailey Clark (Jessica Collins), to no avail. It was revealed that Sharon was neglecting her bipolar disorder medication the whole time and eventually got her health back on track, but continued to debate whether or not she should tell Nick about Summer's true paternity.

Towards the end of 2013 and beginning of 2014, Nick and Sharon began reconnecting romantically. Speaking of their time apart, Case opined: "I think it’s time for Nick and Sharon to get back together, and I am happy about that", and stated that 2014 was the "Year of Shick". Visions of a Ghost Cassie, who appears to be at the age she would have been had she lived, regularly appeared to Sharon while she was off her medication. A vengeful Victor hired a Cassie lookalike, Mariah Copeland (Camryn Grimes), to gaslight/haunt Sharon, so that Nick will question her sanity once more. Through Mariah, Victor discovers that Sharon is hiding a secret, but fails to discover what it is. To stop having these "visions", Sharon undergoes electroconvulsive therapy (ECT), which causes her to experience missing gaps in her memories, and she forgets changing Summer's DNA results. Morrow dubbed Victor's actions as "evil", and while speaking of Sharon's secret about Summer's paternity, stated: "When it comes out, it’s certainly going to create a problem for Nick and Sharon. In September 2014, Nick proposes to Sharon once again and she accepts. Later that month, a special Nick and Sharon episode aired, where twenty of the show's characters ended up arrested altogether after the couple's Bachelor/Bachelorette party. The Soap Opera Network called this a "first for daytime television". Phyllis ends up waking up from her coma and stops the wedding. Soon afterwards, Phyllis exposes Sharon's memories and secrets. Nick and Sharon break up, and enter another bitter custody battle over Faith. New head writer at the time Charles Pratt, Jr. said, "The first thing I did was take Sharon's child away from her, and I did that because it defines passion in the character", opining that Sharon "shouldn't just be in a monogamous relationship with Nick raising Faith. Maybe that's what some in the audience want but, to me, that would be a great waste of Sharon Case's talent."

=== Recent events (2016–present) ===
After several years apart, Nick and Sharon reunite in May 2018 after moving in together. New head writer Mal Young noted: "Sharon's so different now", and explained that Nick and Sharon's relationship would be investigated, saying: "They’ve been together since they were teenagers and no matter how much they tear themselves apart, something brings them back together. Their path of true love will never run smooth."

== Reception ==
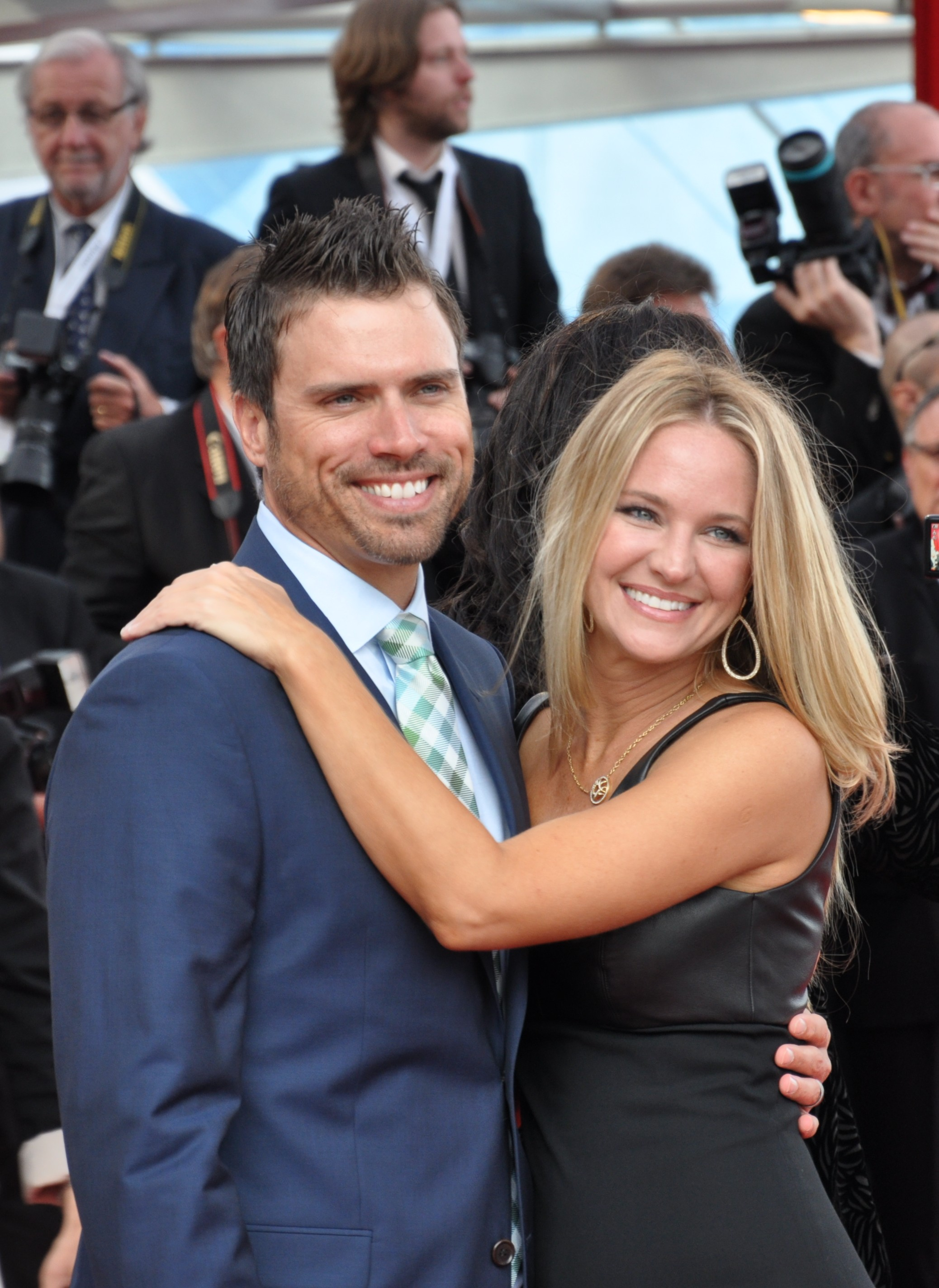
Morrow and Case at the Monte-Carlo Television Festival in 2013.

Nick and Sharon are recognized as a fictional supercouple in the soap opera genre. They are popularly referred to as "Shick", a portmanteau which combines the names Sharon and Nick. On a list of "Greatest Soap Opera Supercouples" compiled by Kim Potts of The Huffington Post, Nick and Sharon were placed 16th. Potts noted, "Young love hasn't turned out to be enduring love for Nick and Sharon, whose multiple affairs and tragic loss of daughter Cassie in a car accident led to the end of their marriage. Nick is now married to Phyllis (who he began an affair with after Cassie's death), but he can't keep his nose out of Sharon's business, much to Phyllis' chagrin, and a Nick/Sharon reunion is always a possibility." On-Air On-Soaps wrote that Nick and Sharon have a "tortured" past together. Nick and Sharon are often compared to Nick's parents, Victor and Nikki Newman, who are considered one of the genre's leading supercouples. Robin Raven of Yahoo! TV noted that "Sharon and Nick Newman are following the footsteps of Victor and Nikki Newman in how many times they break up and get back together." Nick and Sharon were named the "Best Couple" of the year 1996 by Soap Opera Digest. Nick and Sharon were nominated for "Best Chemistry" at the CBS Fan Awards for 2014.

The love triangle of Sharon, Nick and Phyllis garnered attention and was considered one of the genre's most titillating storylines. Soap Opera Digest named it the "Best Love Triangle". Jamaica Gleaner was enthralled by the twists and turns of the love triangle and published an interview with Michelle Stafford; the newspaper asked whether Nick would end his ten-year marriage to Sharon and rather enter into an official romance with her pregnant character Phyllis. Stafford replied, "In a perfect world, she'd wish [the baby was] Nick's. But he's married; he's not going to leave Sharon. And she doesn't want him to." The triangle was also a topic of debate during its run. Daniel R. Coleridge of TV Guide labeled the week Phyllis discovered she was expecting as a "can't-miss week" for the popular triangle. Aubrey Hammack, a writer for AuthorsDen, analysed the storyline and published an article on the matter of adultery. He cited the storyline as realistic, "Men are notorious for saying; I can separate my sexual side from my emotions. Well, unless you are a person without a conscience, this is impossible. Most men just don’t realize that once you have sex with someone, that the emotions kick in not to mention the feelings of being in love and caring about that someone you are having the affair with. When this happens, things spin wildly out of control." With Phyllis and Nick gaining a fan following, On-Air On-Soaps referred to this as the "Phick vs. Shick" fan-base war.

Another notable love triangle formed between Sharon, Nick and his brother, Adam, in later years. Heather Tooley, also of Yahoo! TV, regarded Sharon as having "always been" Nick's damsel in distress, noting that his "undeniable love" led to the end of his marriage to Phyllis. Tooley furthermore noted that once Sharon's relationship with Adam would face trouble, "Nick may find himself on call to help his ex-wife." In September 2012, when Morrow stated on The Talk that he believed Nick and Sharon were "endgame", Jamey Giddens of the website Zap2it wrote: "This revelation caused fans of the "Shick" pairing to rejoice, while "Phick" lovers have been storming social media sites in anger."

Nick and Sharon's highly anticipated 2009 reunion was met with a notable public reaction. SoapNet wrote "the stage was being set for a much-anticipated reunion between first loves Nick Newman and Sharon Collins. Nick's wife, Phyllis, had been scheming to keep them apart for months, and a lot of fans were looking forward to her comeuppance just as much as Nick and Sharon's hookup." Additionally, the Soap Opera Network magazine noted a "sudden boom" in ratings in the episodes surrounding their reunion, which was also attributed to other subplots. The show gained 447,000 total viewers for the week of January 26–30, which was described as "pretty incredible" by SoapNet. Michael Fairman of On-Air On-Soaps said, "Many fans were overjoyed that Nick and Sharon finally reconnected and made love in the cabin." Of working with Joshua Morrow, Case stated: "I feel most comfortable when I am working with him. We have worked together for so many years, and even if I have not worked with him in a long time, I go right back into a groove with him that’s familiar and easy".

== See also ==
- List of supercouples
