= Dylan McAvoy =

Fictional character in The Young and the Restless

- The Young and the Restless character
- Portrayed by: Steve Burton
- Duration: 2013–2017
- First appearance: January 29, 2013
- Last appearance: January 27, 2017
- Created by: Josh Griffith
- Introduced by: Jill Farren Phelps
In-universe information
- Other names: Derek Young
- Occupation: Detective; Police officer; Construction contractor; Bartender; Café owner; Soldier
- Father: Paul Williams
- Mother: Nikki Newman
- Adoptive father: Terry McAvoy
- Adoptive mother: Penelope Harrison
- Stepfather: Victor Newman (2013–present)
- Stepmother: Christine Blair (2013–2023)
- Half-brothers: Nicholas Newman; John Abbott III; Ricky Williams
- Half-sisters: Heather Stevens; Victoria Newman
- Wife: Chelsea Lawson (2013); Sharon Newman (2015–17)
- Stepsons: Noah Newman (2015–17)
- Stepdaughters: Mariah Copeland (2015–17); Faith Newman (2015–17)
- Grandfathers: Nicholas Reed; Carl Williams; Connor McAvoy (adoptive)
- Grandmothers: Mary Williams; Barbara Reed
- Uncles: Todd Williams; Steven Williams
- Aunts: Casey Reed; Patty Williams; Pamela Harrison (adoptive)
- Nephews: Noah Newman; Reed Hellstrom; Johnny Abbott (adoptive)
- Nieces: Eve Nicole Howard; Cassie Newman (adoptive); Summer Newman; Faith Newman; Katie Newman

Dylan McAvoy is a fictional character from The Young and the Restless, an American soap opera on the CBS network, portrayed by Steve Burton. Dylan first appeared on January 29, 2013. He is initially involved in a story arc involving Avery Bailey Clark (Jessica Collins), his former lover who believes he died during the war in Afghanistan. Avery is stunned by Dylan's return, but remains in a relationship with Nicholas Newman (Joshua Morrow). Burton noted the extreme differences between Dylan and his General Hospital character Jason Morgan. The actor was able to have a new wardrobe and look. While Jason was confined and "Stone Cold", Dylan has been credited by Burton as allowing him to portray his lighter side in addition to more of his own personality. The character was later paired with Chelsea Lawson (Melissa Claire Egan); their short-lived romance and marriage received negative reviews from viewers and critics alike.

In October 2013, it was revealed that Dylan is in fact the long-lost son of Nikki Newman (Melody Thomas Scott), Nicholas' mother, making them half-brothers. In June 2014, it was revealed that Dylan's biological father is Nikki's childhood friend, and chief of police, Paul Williams (Doug Davidson). Later, Dylan establishes a relationship with Nicholas' former wife, Sharon Newman (Sharon Case), whom he eventually marries. Burton's performance earned him a Daytime Emmy Award nomination for Outstanding Supporting Actor in a Drama Series in 2014 and 2016, winning the award in 2017. In October 2016, Burton announced his decision to not renew his deal with The Young and the Restless. He made his final appearance on January 27, 2017.

== Casting ==
"It is weird. It is bittersweet in a way. I loved GH. I loved my time there and the people there. But it was also time for something new in my life, a new challenge."

— Burton on joining the show, Entertainment Weekly

In October 2012, Burton departed the role of fan favorite Jason Morgan on ABC Daytime's General Hospital. That November, news broke that The Young and the Restless put out a casting call for a character named Dylan, who was slated to "hit the airwaves" in early 2013. The casting call described him as a "rugged, dynamic, energetic man in his mid-30s" who "comes from humble, blue-collar beginnings, was studying to be an architect when his construction/contractor father was injured and Dylan had to drop out of college to take over the business. He's done two tours of duty in the Middle East, army special ops. The war left a mark on him. He's done his best to bury it with optimism and a wry, sometimes offbeat sense of humor".

After the casting call was issued, there was brief speculation that the character was a recast for Chance Chancellor, who was also a war veteran. Later, Burton's name was attached to the role. During an appearance on The Talk the following January, Burton officially confirmed that he was cast as Dylan. The episode of The Talk was described as "phenomenal"; Burton had no idea it would have been "New Year's Eve kinda crazy." After one of the show's co-hosts Julie Chen made the announcement of his casting and welcomed Burton to the CBS family, confetti dropped while another co-host Sheryl Underwood did a "wild happy dance". Burton said, "I had no idea about the CBS badge or the welcome basket, or anything. That’s not how I think. I understood why CBS did it, because it’s a big deal. I get it. It’s so strange for me, because I have never been one for all this publicity. They have been so gracious to me, and it was so overwhelming that they would do something like that." Burton made his first on-screen appearance during the episode dated January 29, 2013. He attributed much of his success going back to the 1990s when he studied acting at Theater Theater in Hollywood, California, coached by Chris Aable.

Burton's casting attracted a significant amount of media attention. The Hollywood Reporter's Lesley Goldberg noted that it reunited Burton with executive producer Jill Farren Phelps, who was previously the executive producer of General Hospital. Speaking about the decision to cast him, Phelps told TV Guide that the casting department were seeing several actors for the role, and the thought of Burton was "just a dream". She then contacted his manager and together they were "able to make it work out so that Steve could continue to have the life he wants in Nashville."

Discussing his decision to join The Young and the Restless, Burton said on The Talk, "I told my manager if I can keep my family there and I can spend time with them and come back and forth, I would do that in a second. Without hesitation, CBS Daytime made that deal. Really quickly. This is crazy, but I'm just so happy to have the best of both worlds for my family, because before, I couldn't." Burton was happy with the flexibility of his "short term" contract, "I'll get a lot of long weekends and frequent weeks off so I can get back to Nashville. I don't want to work five days a week like I did at GH", he said during a TV Guide interview. The actor said he had "those first-day-of-school jitters" when he first arrived at the CBS building, but was welcomed by everyone. A week before Burton's debut on the series, a promotional ad aired, teasing his arrival with the slogan Daytime's Hottest Soap Just Got Hotter!. In November 2014, Burton announced he had re-signed for another year with the soap.

On October 6, 2016, Burton announced via-social media that he would not renew his deal with the soap, and would exit the role of Dylan.

== Development ==
=== Characterization and portrayal ===
Burton as Jason Morgan, seen wearing a typical black T-shirt, on General Hospital (2010). The actor found Dylan to be more like himself in contrast to Jason.

"I just know I don't want him to be anything like Jason. But, then, I'm even concerned about that. I don't want to go too far away from Jason because that might be pushing it. It might get weird."

— Burton, on trying to contrast Dylan from Jason.

Burton "loved the idea" of playing a character "very different" from Jason Morgan, who was characterized as "Stone Cold". The role of Dylan allowed him to wear colors other than black, which he was famed for at General Hospital. Of returning to daytime television without Jason Morgan's "uniform" and "black T-shirt", Burton described the experience as "refreshing". Explaining his wardrobe process, he said: "I never had to try stuff on. I'm not used to wardrobe fittings. I had to try on about 20 different outfits! That was really grueling. It was important to shake the leather coat and black t-shirt and do my hair different, because I know people are always going to see me as Jason."

Burton revealed that Dylan is "a lot more" like himself. "Jason was so stoic and didn't really get to show a lot of personality, unless it was with Spinelli or Sam," he said. Dylan has a sense of humor, and the actor felt that it would bring out a "lighter side" of his acting. In addition to his "entire makeover" which included a new hairstyle, Burton lost weight to play Dylan, as the costume department wanted him to look younger. Burton admitted during an interview with Entertainment Weekly that he was worried about how Dylan would be received, considering the "persona" of Jason is out there; he hoped "people will buy" Dylan, although some people would say "You are Jason and that's it." Burton told Yahoo! that: "[Dylan is] extremely different. That's the biggest thing for me, that after playing a character, which I loved, for 21 years, coming here and trying to do something different - 'cause I know fans are always gonna see me as that character if they watch the show and if they watch both shows... So, it's definitely a challenge because I was so used to playing that character." Jason's "confined" ways allowed Dylan to have a "little more" of Burton's own personality.

Before his debut, Phelps revealed that Dylan was "greatly traumatized by what happened to him in Afghanistan" and had been "severely injured" but rescued, which is why people believed he had died. Along with being a war veteran, Dylan takes over his family's construction business.

=== Relationships ===
Upon Burton's casting, it was revealed by MSN that Dylan, who was described as "the mysterious ex Avery keeps bringing up" by Jillian Bowe of Zap2it, would be involved in a love triangle with his ex-girlfriend Avery Bailey Clark (Jessica Collins) and her current lover, Nicholas Newman (Joshua Morrow). Of Dylan's storyline and involvement in the love triangle, Phelps said: "Dylan does come to town to find Avery but this story has much more complexity than that [...] What you think is going to happen is not what's going to happen." She noted that Avery was the "great love of his life", though she may not have "the same feelings for him." Avery believed that Dylan died during war; TVLine commented that "such a resurrection" would "surely" derail her romance with Nick. During an interview with MSN, Burton said, "Nick and Dylan will definitely fight for her, but ultimately, it's going to be her choice." Dylan and Avery had an affair while she was still married to her ex-husband, but still had a "great relationship", which was shown through flashbacks. Dylan's primary goal in coming to Genoa City was to make sure she was happy, and if she wanted to get back together. Burton said that Dylan can't get Avery off his mind despite the fact that she had moved on.

Fans of the show speculated that Dylan would be paired with Nick's ex-wife, Sharon Newman (Sharon Case), to which Case responded by stating, "Everybody’s speculating about Dylan, the new character coming to town but, all I can say is, I think it’s fun because it’s a hoot to speculate". Luke Kerr of Zap2it noted how fast Dylan met Sharon, and said they could potentially be a "popular pairing with fans". Of working with Case, Burton stated: "Sharon Case is actually very fun, and she makes me laugh. So half the time in scenes where I am laughing, I am really laughing at Sharon! She has that personality where she makes me laugh." He also noted that fans of the show on Twitter have seen how "comfortable" and "easy" the character's on-screen relationship is. Dylan later shares a one-night stand with Chelsea Lawson (Melissa Claire Egan), who was pregnant with Adam Newman's (Michael Muhney) child; she decides to pass the baby off as Dylan's, and the two later marry. Egan described the character's decision to keep the child's paternity a secret as a "ticking time bomb". Burton stated that Dylan is "not the sharpest tool in the shed", since he believed what Chelsea was telling him. When asked about the child, Burton said: "This kid is everything to him, so once we figure out whose it is, if it’s not his, it’s not going to be a good situation for anybody." When asked if Dylan could forgive Chelsea, Burton added: "That’s a tough one. I don’t know what kind of mental state this is going to put Dylan in, to even think about that."

=== Maternity reveal ===
In October 2013, it was revealed on-screen that Dylan is in fact the long-lost son of Nikki Newman (Melody Thomas Scott). Scott had previously previewed her upcoming storyline in an interview with On-Air On-Soaps, stating: "I love this story! Now, I don’t know how it’s all going to turn out, but the premise, the people I get to work with, and the writing, has been spectacular. That’s all you need; good actors performing a good script, and our fabulous new directing team, and I love them all. I have not been this happy at work in a while." Burton stated in an interview that he enjoyed the plot twist, and compared it to Jason Morgan being Monica Quartermaine's (Leslie Charleson) son on General Hospital. He said that he felt a connection while working with Scott, stating: "There is vulnerability there between us, and it’s not on purpose. It’s just something that is there. It was actually kind of there before it happened that we were on-screen mother and son." In a separate interview with Michael Logan of TV Guide, Scott stated: "Nikki thinks she has come up with a good way of having everyone informed in the kindest way possible. If it were me, I would think, "I can only go through this once. It's too emotional! Let's sit everybody down at the same time and get it over with." Nikki had intended to reveal the news privately to Dylan but that opportunity never comes up." Speaking of how the revelation would affect Nicholas, Scott added, "She feels very badly about Nick losing Avery but not bad enough that she doesn't expect Nick to play nice and accept this man — not necessarily as a brother but still as a member of the family. She expects him to find a way to be civil. She wants everyone to be happy together." Speculation also arose that Nikki's son could be Dylan's best friend Stitch Rayburn (Sean Carrigan), to which Scott teased, "Maybe that's coming. Nikki had cult twins! You never know. I think Sean Carrigan could believably play my son. I think he looks a little like me, probably more like me than Steve Burton does."

== Storylines ==
Dylan McAvoy grew up in Darien, Connecticut, and befriended Phyllis Summers (Michelle Stafford) during his childhood. He moved to Chicago and as a young adult took over his father's construction company after he became injured in an accident. He did construction work for Phyllis' sister, defense attorney Avery Bailey Clark (Jessica Collins). Avery's husband, Joe, neglected her and she began an affair with Dylan. Before being deployed overseas with the U.S. Army, Dylan buys Avery a ring and asks her to leave her husband for him, but she refuses, wanting to work on her marriage. Later, Joe finds out about the affair and divorces Avery. While reading a newspaper months later, Avery discovers that Dylan had been killed in Afghanistan during the war. She moves to Genoa City and begins a relationship with Phyllis' ex-husband, Nicholas Newman (Joshua Morrow). After acting mysterious about her past, Avery admits to Nick that she had an affair with Dylan, who had died.

In 2013, Dylan arrives in Genoa City, having survived the war and wanting to make sure Avery is happy. He runs into Sharon Newman (Sharon Case), Nick's ex-wife who gives him directions to Nick's club, The Underground. While posing under the name "Mack", Dylan gets a job as bartender at The Underground, so he could see Avery from afar. During The Underground's opening night, Avery sees a rock which she gave to Dylan years ago sitting on the bar. She later goes to the basement and comes face to face with Dylan. In a state of confusion, shock and disbelief, Avery hides her emotions when Nick closely follows. Later, she confronts Dylan at his apartment, angry for not telling her he was alive earlier. She tells Nick about this, who fires Dylan. Despite spending a friendly night with Dylan, Avery chooses to remain with Nick, leaving Dylan shattered.

While driving out of town, Dylan's car collides with Sharon's during a major snowstorm. She calls an ambulance, as Dylan shouts for someone named "Sully". Dylan is taken to the hospital where it is revealed Sully was Sullivan, a friend of his who was shot and killed in Afghanistan while trying to shove Dylan a weapon. Sharon hires Dylan as a contractor to fix her roof, and entire kitchen, after it is damaged by the storm. Dylan bonds with Sharon's daughter Faith Newman (Alyvia Alyn Lind). During a hike in the snow with Dylan and Faith, Sharon injures her leg and Faith goes missing briefly; Dylan manages to find her. Sharon and Dylan grow closer.

Later, Dylan's father's (Steve Gagnon) condition worsens, and Dylan brings him to Genoa City so he can keep an eye on him while working on Sharon's kitchen. His father dies, and he finishes Sharon's kitchen, and decides to leave town. However, he has a one-night stand with Chelsea Lawson (Melissa Claire Egan), who is already pregnant and considering finding a fake father for her child, as she was divorcing the child's real father, Adam Newman (Michael Muhney). Dylan comforts Avery when she is being followed by men working for Marcus Wheeler (Mark Pinter), as a result of a dangerous case she is working on. Later, Dylan gets into a fight at Jimmy's Bar and is arrested. Avery pays his bail, but he can't leave town for another month until his hearing date, angering Nick. Chelsea then decides to pass her child off as Dylan's, and the two begin a genuine relationship despite Adam's suspicions that the child is actually his. Dylan later moves Chelsea into his new loft and proposes to her, to which she accepts, and he then arranges an impromptu wedding. Following the ceremony, Chelsea goes into labor and Dylan delivers the child, whom they name Terrence Connor McAvoy, after Dylan's father. However, the marriage ends when Dylan learns that Connor is Adam's son, not his. He also gets another shock when he discovers that he was adopted, and that his birth mother is none other than Nick's mother, Nikki Newman (Melody Thomas Scott).

== Reception ==
=== Casting ===
In December 2012, while Burton's casting was only rumored, Deanna Barnert of MSN's TV Buzz Blog wrote: "Assuming Burton actually comes to The Young and the Restless, the biggest question on everyone's mind is whether the former mob hit man will show up as a good guy, play another a toughie with a heart or go pure villain." Barnert also said it would be "interesting" to see whether "[Burton's] legion of fans from Port Charles will follow him to Genoa City." Jill Farren Phelps developed a reputation and "bad rap" because she "uses people" according to Mark Pinter, an actor and friend of Phelps who had been hired by her to portray Marcus Wheeler on The Young and the Restless. Barnert noted that Burton is "someone who has made his allegiance to Phelps clear" which is why "many fans" had expected him to show up in Genoa City "eventually". TV Guide's Michael Logan had also weighed in on the rumors, calling Burton's "willingness" to work in Los Angeles after leaving General Hospital to live in Nashville a "puzzler". Logan suggested that there could have been more to his decision to quit General Hospital. Stephen Nichols, who had portrayed Tucker McCall on The Young and the Restless for over three years, was fired that December. Logan said Phelps, who was "under orders" to trim the show's budget, may have fired Nichols in order to afford Burton in lieu of him.

Once news of Burton's official casting broke, fans of General Hospital reacted with disappointment and mixed feelings, unaware of his reasoning. While some fans were willing to support his move, others felt "duped". Burton felt that reactions from people who knew the story were "good", but it was at first "difficult".

When asked by TV Guide if he would've remained on General Hospital had the show's producers "tried harder" to accommodate his personal life, Burton stated: "I don't want to point fingers. I know there are a lot of disappointed fans. They don't really understand what goes on behind the doors. They don't understand why I wouldn't go back to play Jason if I'm ready to work again. But what happens at GH should stay at GH." Phelps dismissed rumors that she has "lured" Burton away from General Hospital. While clarifying rumors about him leaving General Hospital because of Phelps' appointment as executive producer of The Young and the Restless, Burton described them as "interesting". He told On-Air On-Soaps that he knew people would try to put "two and two together", but it was never his intention to leave General Hospital purposely, as he just couldn't reach a contractual agreement with the show. "It’s just like a sports player...when a deal does not work out with his team, there might be another team out there that might want him," Burton said. During the week Burton debuted on the series as Dylan, the show experienced an increase of over 105,000 viewers, averaging 4.7 million viewers. Michael Fairman, during an interview with Burton, noted the "significant increase" in viewers, which Burton was a "big reason" for.

=== Performance and storylines ===
"As evidenced here, Burton has improved greatly as an actor since the days when he played Jason Quartermaine Morgan on General Hospital. As Dylan, he has found layers in his character, who has always been a guy almost too good to be true since his introduction last year. Now Burton has many opportunities to add more shades of gray to Dylan, a hero in the war in Afghanistan."

— Journalist Connie Passalacqua Hayman on Burton's portrayal of Dylan (2013)

Burton's portrayal of Dylan has been generally well received. The character's romance with Chelsea Lawson (Melissa Claire Egan), however, garnered a negative response from viewers and critics alike. Luke Kerr of Zap2it wrote that their storyline was "everyone’s favorite storyline for curing insomnia". Despite negative reviews, Burton's portrayal during the storyline was praised, specifically by journalist Connie Passalacqua Hayman, who wrote: "But it was Steve Burton as Dylan who stole the show with Dylan’s tearful and very sensitive reaction to the news, as his character loves what he believed to be his baby very much." When the truth about the paternity of Chelsea's child was revealed, Michael Fairman of On-Air On-Soaps remarked (in reference to Burton), "When the truth came out it provided some meaty material for this fan favorite." Sara Bibel of Xfinity gave a mixed review when Dylan was revealed as Nikki's son, writing: "However, the foreshadowing that Dylan (Steve Burton) is going to turn out to be Nikki’s long-lost son is so heavy-handed that it seems hard to believe that the show is going in any other direction. Dylan is the right age. He looks like he could be related to Nikki. The character is in desperate need of a more ties to the canvas; being Avery’s ex is not enough to keep him in town, much less front-and-center. My big objection to this twist is, what’s the actual story? We have spent months learning every single thing about this character who probably would not exist if Y&R hadn’t jumped at the chance to poach Burton from GH." She added: "Dylan would get a mother to replace his father that passed away. Nikki would get a child who can use his carpentry skills to build her a nice bookcase. That’s sweet, but it’s a situation, not a plot. There really aren’t any consequences. Nick would be angry that the guy he’s convinced Avery still loves is his half-brother, but he already has one half-brother he despises. Another one really isn’t a big deal." Burton's portrayal earned him a nomination for the Daytime Emmy Award for Outstanding Supporting Actor in a Drama Series in 2014 and 2016.
