= Reylynn Caster =

American actress (born 2003)

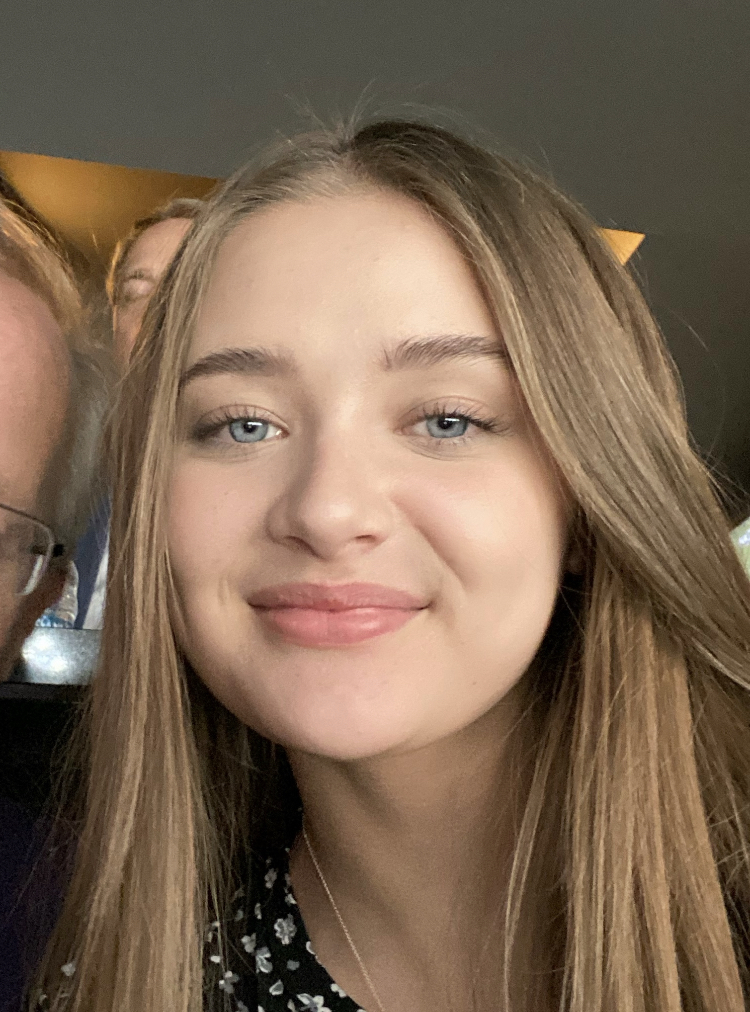
- Reylynn Caster in 2021
- Born: March 3, 2003 (age 23); Wichita, Kansas, U.S.
- Occupation: Actress
- Years active: 2010–present

Reylynn Caster (born March 3, 2003) is an American actress best known for the role of Faith Newman on The Young and the Restless as of April 2021.

== Early life ==
Caster was born March 3, 2003 in Wichita, Kansas. Her family moved to Los Angeles in 2015 so she could pursue her acting career.

== Career ==
After starting her acting career in local music theater, Caster made her first appearance in a national television commercial at the age of 7 with Leif Jonker, director of the cult horror film, Darkness. While in Kansas she appeared in independent films Wichita, Bender, and The Matchbreaker.

An audition for the movie Logan raised the interest of a Los Angeles-based talent agency which signed her to their roster.

Within six months of moving to Los Angeles in the fall of 2015, she appeared in the ABC sitcom Speechless, and the Amazon Prime series Just Add Magic and landed her first series regular role on the CBS sitcom Me, Myself & I as the love interest of Jack Dylan Grazer, opposite veteran actors Bobby Moynihan, Jaleel White, John Larroquette, and Sharon Lawrence.

In 2020, she played Lola Wight, oldest daughter of WWE superstar Big Show (Paul Wight) on The Big Show Show, debuting on April 6, 2020, on Netflix, where she was one of three with ties to Wichita. Paul Wight played college basketball at Wichita State University and showrunner and co-creator of the show, Jason Berger, spent much of his early life in the Midwestern city.

In April 2021, Caster took over the role of Faith Newman on The Young and the Restless replacing Alyvia Alyn Lind.

== Filmography ==
=== Film ===
Year	Title	Role	Notes	Refs
2014	Wichita	Mary		
2016	The Matchbreaker	Lemonade Stand Girl		
2016	Bender	Little Girl		
2019	Adventures of Dally & Spanky	Ella		

=== Television ===
Year	Title	Role	Notes	Refs
2017	Speechless	Zelda	Episode: "O-S-- OSCAR P-A-- PARTY"	
2017	Walk the Prank	Tiffany Spates	Episode: "A Star is Not Born"	
2018	Just Add Magic	Shannon	Recurring role (season 2)	
2017–2018	Me, Myself & I	Nori	Main role	
2019	American Housewife	Brie Witherspoon	Recurring role	
2020	The Big Show Show	Lola Wight	Main role	
2021–present	The Young and the Restless	Faith Newman	Main role	
2024	S.W.A.T.	Tina Carter	Episode: "Escape"	
