= Soap Opera Digest Award for Hottest Male Star =

Television award category

- Awarded for: Hottest Male Star
- Country: United States
- Currently held by: Steve Burton, General Hospital, (1999)

The Soap Opera Digest Award for Hottest Male Star has been given every year since the ninth Soap Opera Digest Award in 1993 until 1999.

In the lists below, the winner of the award for each year is shown first, followed by the other nominees.

== Winners ==
Year	Recipients	Program	Role	Network	Ref
1993	Mark Derwin	Guiding Light	A.C. Mallet	CBS	
1994	Drake Hogestyn	Days of Our Lives	John Black	NBC	
1995	Drake Hogestyn	Days of Our Lives	John Black	NBC	
1996	Peter Reckell	Days of Our Lives	Bo Brady	NBC	
1997	Ingo Rademacher	General Hospital	Jasper Jax	ABC	
1998	Ingo Rademacher	General Hospital	Jasper Jax	ABC	
1999	Steve Burton	General Hospital	Jason Morgan	ABC	

== Total awards won ==
Wins	Series
3	Days of Our Lives
3	General Hospital
1	Guiding Light

== Multiple wins ==
Wins	Actor
2
2	Drake Hogestyn
2	Ingo Rademacher
