= Avery Bailey Clark =

Fictional character

- The Young and the Restless character
- Portrayed by: Jessica Collins
- Duration: 2011–2015
- First appearance: July 27, 2011
- Last appearance: July 21, 2015
- Created by: Maria Arena Bell, Hogan Sheffer and Scott Hamner
- Introduced by: Maria Arena Bell
In-universe information
- Other names: Avery Bailey Summers
- Occupation: Attorney
- Father: George Summers Jr.
- Mother: Lydia Callahan
- Sisters: Phyllis Summers
- Husband: Joe Clark (1996–2001)
- Grandfathers: George Summers Sr.
- Grandmothers: Harriet Summers
- Nephews: Daniel Romalotti
- Nieces: Summer Newman

Avery Bailey Clark is a fictional character from the American CBS Daytime soap opera, The Young and the Restless, portrayed by actress Jessica Collins. She made her appearance as Avery on July 27, 2011, as a high-class attorney. Avery first came to Genoa City after being hired by Victor Newman to be Sharon Newman's lawyer during the character's murder case. She was later revealed to be the estranged sister of Phyllis Summers. Her storylines have predominantly included her legal work, feuding with Phyllis, a romance with Phyllis' ex-husband Nicholas Newman and a history with Dylan McAvoy. Collins left the series on July 21, 2015.

== Casting ==
In June 2011, it was announced that former Loving actress Jessica Collins had been cast in the role of Avery. Collins was previously also known for her roles in television shows such as Beverly Hills, 90210 and American Dreams and guest appearances on Two and a Half Men, CSI: Crime Scene Investigation and Nip/Tuck. Speaking of her casting, Collins said that "I always open to returning to daytime" but it "had to be for the right role". She explained: "This one happened really quickly. Y&R called me and I read the part and I was interested in the character immediately. The timing was right. I felt this was a good fit for me." There were circulating rumors that Collins' character could be related to a previous character, Matt Clark, who had been portrayed by actors Eddie Cibrian and Rick Hearst. Speaking of the rumor, Collins stated: "That’s the first I’ve heard of that. I don’t know much Eddie and I look alike but that’s never stopped anything in daytime".

In May 2015, Soap Opera Digest reported that Collins was leaving the show, with Avery's last appearance on July 21, 2015.

== Development ==
=== Characterization ===
Prior to her debut on the series, it was revealed by soap journalist Michael Fairman that she was a "high-powered attorney who will represent the accused murderess Sharon Newman. Who hires Avery? The Mustache! (And we know how much he likes hot blondes!)". The character is a famous attorney; known for defending the wrongly accused. On whether Avery could get Sharon's (Sharon Case) guilty verdict reversed, Collins said that these types of cases are what "Avery lives for". Collins said "She's dedicated her life to righting the wrongs of the system. She's started up an Innocence Project. She's not in it for the money." Describing the character, she said that she isn't a "glamorous lawyer", but more on the "clunky side". Additionally, the actress describes her "more as a 'broad' than a lady."

In October 2012, after over a year on the series, Avery's residence was shown. The apartment designed by the show's production designer Bill Hultstrom was an "eclectic" home which was made to reflect Collin's real-life background as a professional gourmet chef. In the apartment, Collins stated that Avery mostly "cooks and fantasizes". Avery in her apartment unveiled a different side to the character; Collins said she enjoyed playing the "awkward, goofy, fun side" of Avery who is usually so "serious in her business life". Luke Kerr of Zap2It described Avery as a "cupcake-baking, legal eagle". Michael Logan of TV Guide called her a "Julia Child wannabe".

=== Family and relationships ===
Upon her debut, CBS Soaps In Depth stated that "Any familial dynamics Avery may – or may not – have will unfold over time." In a twist, it was revealed that she was the younger sister of Phyllis Newman (Michelle Stafford). They have a bitter relationship towards one another because of Phyllis leaving her as a child. A few months into Avery's reunion with Phyllis, their dying father George Summers (Ken Howard) is introduced to the series. While interviewing Stafford, soap opera journalist Michael Fairman noted: "All of a sudden members of Phyllis’s family are sprouting up. First up was her sister Avery. And now with this recent storyline, Y&R is bringing back up the sins of the father, with Phyllis and Avery’s dad George, in the picture for just a brief time." Of Phyllis and Avery's relationship, Stafford said that Collins and herself are still "working it out", calling it an "interesting" relationship. She said "we wanted to make it a very complex and odd relationship, and even the scenes where we are at the facility with the dad at the end of the story arc are really interesting. What I like about those scenes, and how they play out, is that nothing has been resolved." Stafford said she enjoyed working with Collins, "Jessica is amazing. She is so professional and so great. She is so willing to work scenes out." Additionally, Stafford said that Phyllis is jealous of Avery being a successful attorney while she had "bounced around" to find a career for herself.

Avery fell in love with Phyllis' ex-husband, Nicholas Newman (Joshua Morrow), their relationship was very complicated due to the fact that he was Phyllis' ex. They overcame all of their problems. Nick then began wondering about her past relationships. She told him that the man she loved, Dylan, died during the war in Afghanistan. However, it was revealed by executive producer Jill Farren Phelps that Dylan "is a war veteran who was greatly traumatized by what happened to him in Afghanistan. He was severely injured and was rescued by a family who helped him recuperate. He's not been heard from for a couple of years, which is why people think he's dead".

In January 2013, soap opera veteran actor Steve Burton joined the show's cast as Dylan McAvoy. TVLine noted that his "resurrection" "surely would derail" Avery's new life with Nick. Jillian Bowe of Zap2it described Dylan as the "mysterious ex Avery keeps bringing up". Additionally, Phelps noted Avery to be "the great love of" Dylan's life, although she wasn't sure if Avery "had the same feelings for him". Flashbacks "to bring the audience into the history of the Dylan-Avery relationship" aired. Dylan came to town, initially posing under the name Mac. He got a job at Nick's nightclub, The Underground, and hoped to see Avery from afar. They eventually came face to face, shocking Avery. She was puzzled, but ultimately chose to remain with Nick instead of reuniting with Dylan. Nick and Avery soon became engaged which upset Phyllis.

== Storylines ==
Avery is the younger sister of Phyllis. She was born in Darien, Connecticut. Growing up, the sisters were close. However their father George was bilking people out of their life savings. Phyllis turned him in and fled the family, leaving Avery behind and "triggering years of estrangement."

Avery first appeared in Genoa City in 2011 after being hired by Victor Newman (Eric Braeden) to help Sharon Newman (Sharon Case), who was wrongfully convicted of murdering Skye Lockhart (Laura Stone). Avery even pretended to flirt with Sharon's ex, Adam Newman (Michael Muhney) to get to the truth to find evidence. Avery was able to create a trial for Sharon, which could be her door to freedom. Her arrival in Genoa City also seemed to disturb Phyllis, as she recognized Avery when she researched her on the internet. They ran into each other, and it was discovered that she was Phyllis's younger sister. Sharon was initially going to plead guilty when offered only 18 months (and then freedom) if she did so, however Avery made sure her children were in the court room, so she wouldn't lie and say she committed murder when she hadn't; and it worked. Months later Sharon was freed.

Avery formed a friendship with Nicholas Newman (Joshua Morrow), who was not only Sharon's ex-husband of eleven years, but involved with Phyllis at the time. Once Nick left Phyllis, he and Avery became involved. To get under Phyllis' skin, Avery agreed to become Daisy Carter (a psychotic person who had given birth to Phyllis' granddaughter, to whom Phyllis managed to get full custody of) lawyer and it also allowed Daisy to spend time with her daughter, Lucy Abbott Summers. Despite this, Avery's reasoning was more personal, as she didn't have full knowledge of Daisy's potential. Sharon was later set free to go and be with her family.

Avery and Nick continued to see each other, but she left him knowing he only loved Phyllis and Sharon. He left her for Phyllis. Avery represented Nick when he was against Sharon's plea to the courts to gain joint custody of their daughter, Faith; but Sharon regained joint custody. It was revealed that their father George was dying. Avery visited him on his dying bed and mended things with him, however, Phyllis didn't. Out of pure spite, Avery helped reduce Daisy's prison sentence and vowed to get her custody of Lucy. Eventually, Phyllis and Avery's rivalry calmed down and they have been cordial to each other. Avery became Victor Newman's personal lawyer, handling business at Newman Enterprises, after Michael Baldwin was sworn in as District Attorney. After Victor went missing following his marriage to Sharon, Sharon burned the prenuptial agreement which Avery had drawn up, and then took over Newman Enterprises.

Nick and his sister Victoria Abbott (Amelia Heinle) initially want Avery's help, however, as Victor's lawyer she was obliged by law to help out Sharon, much to her dismay. Nonetheless, she helped Nick prove Sharon was an unfit leader for the company behind the scenes. Although the judge ruled that Sharon was fit to be CEO of Newman, Victor eventually returned, ending her reign of destruction. Recently following the breakdown of Nick and Phyllis' second marriage, she re-connects with Nick and they start flirting. Despite not wanting to be with him because of her sister, she continues to daydream about them being together. Avery also began connecting with her niece, Summer Newman (Hunter King).

== Reception ==
In 2013 and 2016, Collins received Daytime Emmy Award nominations for Outstanding Supporting Actress in a Drama Series for her portrayal of Avery, winning in 2016.
