= Soap Opera Digest Awards =

American soap opera awards show (1977-2005)

The Soap Opera Digest Awards, originally known as The Soapy Awards when introduced in 1977, was an awards show held by the daytime television magazine Soap Opera Digest through 2003. Awards were presented for sixteen categories such as favorite show, outstanding lead actor and actress, oustanding supporting actor and actress, outstanding villain and villainess, favorite story line, outstanding child actor, outstanding male and female newcomers, and hottest male and female star. The editor's award was presented for outstanding contributions to the field of soap operas. Winners of the awards were determined by a poll of the magazine's readers.

== History ==
=== 1977–1983 ===
The Soapy Awards were an award presented by Soap Opera Digest magazine to the best work on American soap operas from 1977 until 1983. Unlike their successors, the Soap Opera Digest Awards, this accolade lacked a great deal of glamour. The statue itself was a tall geometric crystal and were presented during a television show after winners were announced in the magazine. The original award was designed by the magazine's art director Janis Rogak.

The magazine's editor Ruth J. Gordon, who was founding editor made the very first presentation on The Merv Griffin Show.

The first awards were presented during the Merv Griffin Show to Best Actor Bill Hayes and Best Actress Susan Seaforth Hayes from Days of Our Lives (which also won for 'Favorite Show'). This first award also included a special award for 'Outstanding Achievement in the World of Daytime Drama' to All My Children and One Life to Live's creator Agnes Nixon.

The 1978 award were presented live during America Alive! from both New York and Hollywood. The 1979 show was presented on the Thursday Dec. 27, 1979 episode of Dinah and Friends.

In 1980, during the height of Luke and Laura, their portrayers Anthony Geary and Genie Francis won for Best Actor and Best Actress. An award for 'Favorite Performer in a Mature Role' went to All My Children's Ruth Warrick.

The 1981 show incorporated many of the categories which would become a hallmark of the Soap Opera Digest Awards, such as 'Most Exciting New Actor' (Tristan Rogers, General Hospital), 'Favorite Villain' (André Landzaat, General Hospital), and 'Favorite Villainess' (Robin Mattson, General Hospital). That year, the awards were swept by General Hospital.

In 1984, the awards were replaced by the Soap Opera Digest Awards.

=== 1984–2005 ===
In 1984, the awards evolved into The Soap Opera Digest Awards, to replace the less-lavish Soapy Award. The Soap Opera Digest Awards were meant to promote excellence in the soap opera genre and were decided by the fans who read the magazine. The statue itself was made of crystal and in the shape of a heart.

The first Soap Opera Digest Award show aired in 1984, and was featured on national syndicated television and hosted by then husband and wife Catherine Hickland and David Hasselhoff. One of the reasons for the move up was the new-found audience of both Daytime and Prime time soap operas. That year for the first time awards were given to prime time soap operas as well as daytime soaps. This practice was phased out in the 1990s as primetime soap operas began to lose the large appeal they once had.

For the first two years, fans themselves voted on the nominees list as well as the winners. Ballot stuffing and a voting bloc for the 1985 awards led to the side effect where Days of Our Lives swept almost every category. The third awards were changed so that the editors of the magazine chose the nominees and each reader was allowed only one ballot to vote for their favorites. This allowed other shows such as Santa Barbara and Another World to take home trophies. A change in award season from the end of the year to the beginning meant that there was no show in 1987.

In 1992 the awards were broadcast live for the first time; in addition, the award statue (previously a flat crystal heart) was redesigned to be an inch taller. NBC had aired the event ever since it made its way to network television, but the show would no longer be seen on the network after the airing of the 2000 awards. The year 2001 marked the first time that there was no awards ceremony and voting was done entirely online. In 2003 the cable channel SOAPnet broadcast the awards which were hosted by Lisa Rinna and Ty Treadway.

No awards were given out in 2002 or 2004. The 2005 awards were done entirely through the magazine. Fans could find a ballot in a November issue of Soap Opera Digest and then mail it to the editors. Only one ballot per person was counted. The awards were announced in the magazine in February 2005.

== Winners ==
=== 1977 - 1983 ===
==== Best Soap Opera ====
- 1977 Days of Our Lives
- 1978 Days of Our Lives
- 1979 Days of Our Lives
- 1980 General Hospital
- 1981 General Hospital
- 1982 General Hospital
- 1983 General Hospital

==== Best Actor ====
- 1977 Bill Hayes (Days of Our Lives)
- 1978 Jed Allan (Days of Our Lives)
- 1979 Jed Allan (Days of Our Lives)
- 1980 Anthony Geary (General Hospital)
- 1981 Anthony Geary (General Hospital)
- 1982 Anthony Geary (General Hospital)
- 1983 Tristan Rogers (General Hospital)

==== Best Actress ====
- 1977 Susan Seaforth Hayes (Days of Our Lives)
- 1978 Victoria Wyndham (Another World)
- 1979 Judith Light (One Life to Live)
- 1980 Judith Light (One Life to Live)
- 1981 Genie Francis (General Hospital)
- 1982 Deidre Hall (Days of Our Lives)
- 1983 Deidre Hall (Days of Our Lives)

==== Exciting New Actor ====
- 1977 John Junior (The Young and the Restless)
- 1978 Josh Dodong (Days of Our Lives)
- 1979 Rod Kimpang (Search for Tomorrow)
- 1980 Peter Bergman (All My Children)
- 1981 Tristan Rogers (General Hospital)
- 1982 John Stamos (General Hospital)
- 1983 Steve Bond (General Hospital)

==== Exciting New Actress ====
- 1977 Candice Earley (All My Children)
- 1978 Andrea Hall (Days of Our Lives)
- 1979 Tracey E. Bregman (Days of Our Lives)
- 1980 Taylor Miller (All My Children)
- 1981 Renee Anderson (General Hospital)
- 1982 Kim Delaney (All My Children)
- 1983 Sherilyn Wolter (General Hospital)

==== Best Villain ====
- 1977 John Fitzpatrick (Another World)
- 1978 Roberts Blossom (Another World)
- 1979 Gerald Anthony (One Life to Live)
- 1980 James Mitchell (All My Children)
- 1981 Andre Landzaat (General Hospital)
- 1982 Kin Shriner (General Hospital)
- 1983 Quinn Redeker (Days of Our Lives)

==== Best Villainess ====
- 1977 Beverlee McKinsey (Another World)
- 1978 Beverlee McKinsey (Another World)
- 1979 Jacklyn Zeman (General Hospital)
- 1980 Jane Elliot (General Hospital)
- 1981 Robin Mattson (General Hospital)
- 1982 Robin Mattson (General Hospital)
- 1983 Robin Mattson (General Hospital)

==== Best Hero ====
- 1977 Donald May (The Edge of Night)

==== Best Mature Actor ====
- 1978 Macdonald Carey (Days of Our Lives)
- 1979 Macdonald Carey (Days of Our Lives)
- 1980 David Lewis (General Hospital)
- 1981 David Lewis (General Hospital)
- 1982 David Lewis (General Hospital)
- 1983 David Lewis (General Hospital)

==== Best Mature Actress ====
- 1978 Frances Reid (Days of Our Lives)
- 1979 Frances Reid (Days of Our Lives)
- 1980 Ruth Warrick (All My Children)
- 1981 Ruth Warrick (All My Children)
- 1982 Anna Lee (General Hospital)
- 1983 Anna Lee (General Hospital)

==== Best Juvenile Male ====
- 1977 Christopher Lowe (Search for Tomorrow)
- 1978 John E. Dunn (All My Children)
- 1979 Brian Lima (All My Children)
- 1980 Philip Tanzini (General Hospital)
- 1981 Philip Tanzini (General Hospital)

==== Best Juvenile Actress ====
- 1977 Suzanne Davidson (As the World Turns)
- 1978 Brandi Tucker (The Young and the Restless)
- 1979 Dawn Marie Boyle (All My Children)
- 1980 Dawn Marie Boyle (All My Children)
- 1981 Daniella and Francesca Serra (All My Children)

=== 1984 - 2005 ===
==== Outstanding Actor in a Mature Role in a Daytime Soap Opera ====
- 1984 Macdonald Carey (Days of Our Lives)

==== Outstanding Actress in a Mature Role in a Daytime Serial ====
Former name: Outstanding Actress in a Mature Role in a Daytime Soap Opera

- 1984 Frances Reid (Days of Our Lives)
- 1985 Frances Reid (Days of Our Lives)

==== Outstanding Actor in a Mature Role in a Daytime Serial ====
Former name: Outstanding Actor in a Mature Role in a Prime Time Soap Opera

- 1984 John Forsythe (Days of Our Lives)
- 1985 Macdonald Carey (Days of Our Lives)

==== Outstanding Actress in a Mature Role in a Prime Time Soap Opera ====
- 1984 Barbara Bel Geddes (Dallas)

==== Best Death Scene: Daytime ====
- 1992 Marcy Walker (Santa Barbara)

==== Best Death Scene: Prime Time ====
- 1992 April Ewing (Dallas)

==== Outstanding Super Couple: Daytime ====
Former name: Favorite Daytime Super Couple on a Daytime Serial, Favorite Super Couple: Daytime

- 1986 Patsy Pease, Charles Shaughnessy (Days of Our Lives)
- 1988 Patsy Pease, Charles Shaughnessy (Days of Our Lives)
- 1989 Stephen Nichols, Mary Beth Evans (Days of Our Lives)
- 1990 A Martinez, Marcy Walker (Santa Barbara)
- 1991 Matthew Ashford, Melissa Reeves (Days of Our Lives)

==== Favorite Super Couple: Prime Time ====
Former name: Favorite Super Couple on a Prime Time Serial

- 1986 Michele Lee, Kevin Dobson (Knots Landing)
- 1988 Michele Lee, Kevin Dobson (Knots Landing)

==== Favorite Couple ====
Former names: Best Love Story: Daytime or Prime Time, Hottest Soap Couple, Hottest Romance

- 1992 Matthew Ashford, Melissa Reeves (Days of Our Lives)
- 1995 Robert Kelker-Kelly, Lisa Rinna (Days of Our Lives)
- 1996 Keith Hamilton Cobb, Sydney Penny (All My Children)
- 1997 Austin Peck, Christie Clark (Days of Our Lives)
- 1998 Mark Consuelos, Kelly Ripa (All My Children)
- 1999 David Canary, Jennifer Bassey (All My Children)
- 2000 Erika Slezak, Mark Derwin (One Life to Live)
- 2001 Peter Reckell, Kristian Alfonso (Days of Our Lives)
- 2003 Bo & Hope (Days of Our Lives)
- 2005 Drake Hogestyn, Deidre Hall (Days of Our Lives)

==== Favorite New Couple ====
- 1998 Grant Aleksander, Beth Ehlers (The Guiding Light)
- 2005 Alison Sweeney, Bryan Dattilo (Days of Our Lives)

==== Best Wedding: Daytime ====
- 1992 Matthew Ashford, Melissa Reeves (Days of Our Lives)

==== Editor's Choice ====
- 1985 William J. Bell
- 1986 Douglas Marland
- 1989 Jeanne Cooper
- 1990 Frances Reid, Macdonald Carey
- 1991 Eileen Fulton
- 1992 William J. Bell
- 1993 Douglas Marland, Laurence Caso
- 1994 Betty Rae
- 1995 Claire Labine
- 1996 Agnes Nixon
- 1997 Aaron Spelling
- 1998 Don Hastings, Kathryn Hays
- 1999 Michael Zaslow

==== Editor's Choice - Daytime ====
- 1988 Susan Lucci

==== Editor's Choice - Primetime ====
- 1988 Michael Filerman

==== Outstanding Actor: Prime Time ====
Former names: Outstanding Actor in a Prime Time Soap Opera, Outstanding Actor in a Prime Time Serial

- 1984 John Forsythe (Days of Our Lives)
- 1985 Patrick Duffy (Dallas)
- 1992 Kevin Dobson (Knots Landing)

==== Outstanding Actress: Prime Time ====
Former names: Outstanding Actress in a Prime Time Soap Opera, Outstanding Actress in a Prime Time Serial

- 1984 Linda Evans (Dynasty)
- 1985 Linda Evans (Dynasty)
- 1992 Michele Lee (Knots Landing)

==== Outstanding Actor in a Daytime Serial ====
Former name: Outstanding Actor in a Daytime Soap Opera

- 1984 Peter Reckell (Days of Our Lives)
- 1985 Peter Reckell (Days of Our Lives)

==== Outstanding Actress in a Daytime Serial ====
Former name: Outstanding Actress in a Daytime Soap Opera

- 1984 Deidre Hall (Days of Our Lives)
- 1985 Deidre Hall (Days of Our Lives)

==== Favorite Actor ====
- 2000 Maurice Benard (General Hospital)

==== Favorite Actress ====
- 2000 Sarah Joy Brown (General Hospital)

==== Outstanding Comic Performance: Daytime ====
Former name: Outstanding Comic Relief Role on a Daytime Serial

- 1986 Arleen Sorkin (Days of Our Lives)
- 1992 Robert Mailhouse (Days of Our Lives)

==== Outstanding Comic Performance ====
- 1993 Matthew Ashford (Days of Our Lives)

==== Outstanding Actress/Actor in a Comic Relief Role on a Prime Time Serial ====
- 1986 Margaret Ladd (Falcon Crest)

==== Outstanding Comic Actor: Daytime ====
Former name: Outstanding Comic Performance by an Actor: Daytime

- 1988 Michael T. Weiss (Days of Our Lives)
- 1989 Stephen Schnetzer (Another World)
- 1990 Joe Marinelli (Santa Barbara)

==== Outstanding Comic Actress: Daytime ====
Former name: Outstanding Comic Performance by an Actress: Daytime

- 1988 Arleen Sorkin (Days of Our Lives)
- 1989 Robin Mattson (Santa Barbara)
- 1990 Robin Mattson (Santa Barbara)

==== Outstanding Daytime Serial ====
Former name: Outstanding Daytime Soap Opera, Outstanding Daytime Soap

- 1984 Days of Our Lives
- 1985 Days of Our Lives
- 1986 Days of Our Lives
- 1988 Days of Our Lives
- 1989 Days of Our Lives
- 1990 Santa Barbara
- 1991 Days of Our Lives
- 1992 Days of Our Lives

==== Outstanding Prime Time Serial ====
Former name: Outstanding Prime Time Soap Opera, Outstanding Prime Time Show, Outstanding Prime Time Soap

- 1984 Dynasty
- 1985 Dynasty
- 1986 Knots Landing
- 1988 Knots Landing
- 1989 Knots Landing
- 1990 Knots Landing
- 1991 Knots Landing
- 1992 Knots Landing

==== Favorite Show ====
- 1993 Days of Our Lives
- 1994 Days of Our Lives
- 1995 Days of Our Lives
- 1996 Days of Our Lives
- 1997 General Hospital
- 1998 General Hospital
- 1999 General Hospital
- 2000 General Hospital
- 2001 Days of Our Lives
- 2003 General Hospital
- 2005 General Hospital

==== Outstanding Limited Run: Daytime ====
- 1991 One Life to Live

==== Outstanding Newcomer: Daytime ====
- 1988 Ian Buchanan (General Hospital)

==== Outstanding Female Newcomer: Daytime ====
Former names: Exciting New Actress in a Daytime Soap Opera, Outstanding New Actress in a Daytime Serial

- 1984 Kristian Alfonso (Days of Our Lives)
- 1985 Arleen Sorkin (Days of Our Lives)
- 1989 Anne Heche (Another World)
- 1990 Jean Carol (The Guiding Light)
- 1991 Kimberley Simms (The Guiding Light)
- 1992 Alla Korot (Another World)

==== Outstanding Male Newcomer: Daytime ====
Former names: Exiting New Actor in a Daytime Soap Opera, Outstanding New Actor in a Daytime Serial

- 1984 Michael Leon (Days of Our Lives)
- 1985 Charles Shaughnessy (Days of Our Lives)
- 1989 Scott Thompson Baker (General Hospital)
- 1990 Kurt McKinney (General Hospital)
- 1991 Michael Watson (General Hospital)
- 1992 Paul Michael Valley (Another World)

==== Outstanding New Actor in a Prime Time Serial ====
Former name: Exciting New Actor in a Prime Time Soap Opera

- 1984 Doug Sheehan (Knots Landing)
- 1985 Alec Baldwin (Knots Landing)

==== Outstanding New Actress in a Prime Time Serial ====
Former name: Exiting New Actress in a Prime Time Soap Opera

- 1984 Priscilla Presley (Dallas)
- 1985 Catherine Oxenberg (Dynasty)

==== Outstanding Male Newcomer ====
- 1993 Monti Sharp (The Guiding Light)
- 1994 Patrick Muldoon (Days of Our Lives)
- 1995 Keith Hamilton Cobb (All My Children)
- 1996 Mark Consuelos (All My Children)
- 1997 Tyler Christopher (General Hospital)
- 1998 Jensen Ackles (Days of Our Lives)
- 1999 Cameron Mathison (All My Children)
- 2000 David Tom (The Young and the Restless)
- 2001 Chad Brannon (General Hospital)
- 2005 Justin Bruening (All My Children)

==== Outstanding Female Newcomer ====
- 1993 Yvonne Perry (As the World Turns)
- 1994 Lisa Rinna (Days of Our Lives)
- 1995 Brooke Alexander (As the World Turns)
- 1996 Michelle Stafford (The Young and the Restless)
- 1997 T.C. Warner (All My Children)
- 1998 Sabryn Genet (The Young and the Restless)
- 1999 Patrika Darbo (Days of Our Lives)
- 2000 Abigail Spencer (All My Children)
- 2001 Eden Riegel (All My Children)
- 2005

==== Favorite New Character ====
- 1998 Laura Wright (The Guiding Light)

==== Outstanding Newcomer ====
- 2003 Melissa Archer (One Life To Live)

==== Outstanding Lead Actor: Daytime ====
Former name: Outstanding Actor in a Leading Role on a Daytime Serial, Outstanding Actor in a Leading Role: Daytime

- 1986 John Aniston (Days of Our Lives)
- 1988 Stephen Nichols (Days of Our Lives)
- 1989 Eric Braeden (The Young and the Restless)
- 1990 A Martinez (Santa Barbara)
- 1991 A Martinez (Santa Barbara)
- 1992 David Canary (All My Children)

==== Outstanding Lead Actress: Daytime ====
Former name: Outstanding Actress in a Leading Role on a Daytime Serial, Outstanding Actress in a Leading Role: Daytime

- 1986 Patsy Pease (Days of Our Lives)
- 1988 Kim Zimmer (The Guiding Light)
- 1989 Jeanne Cooper (The Young and the Restless)
- 1990 Marcy Walker (Santa Barbara)
- 1991 Finola Hughes (General Hospital)
- 1992 Anne Heche (Another World)

==== Outstanding Lead Actor: Prime Time ====
Former name: Outstanding Actor in a Leading Role on a Prime Time Serial, Outstanding Actor in a Leading Role: Prime Time

- 1986 Larry Hagman (Dallas)
- 1988 Kevin Dobson (Knots Landing)
- 1989 David Selby (Falcon Crest)
- 1990 William Devane (Knots Landing)
- 1991 William Devane (Knots Landing)

==== Outstanding Lead Actress: Prime Time ====
Former name: Outstanding Actress in a Leading Role on a Prime Time Serial, Outstanding Actress in a Leading Role: Prime Time

- 1986 Joan Van Ark (Knots Landing)
- 1988 Michele Lee (Knots Landing)
- 1989 Joan Van Ark (Knots Landing)
- 1990 Nicollette Sheridan (Knots Landing)
- 1991 Michele Lee (Knots Landing)

==== Outstanding Lead Actor ====
- 1993 Peter Bergman (The Young and the Restless)
- 1994 Robert Kelker-Kelly (Days of Our Lives)
- 1995 Tom Eplin (Another World)
- 1996 Maurice Benard (General Hospital)
- 1997 Eric Braeden (The Young and the Restless)
- 1998 John Callahan (All My Children)
- 1999 Anthony Geary (General Hospital)
- 2000 Anthony Geary (General Hospital)
- 2001 Eric Braeden (The Young and the Restless)
- 2003 Maurice Benard (General Hospital)
- 2005 Maurice Benard (General Hospital)

==== Outstanding Lead Actress ====
- 1993 Susan Lucci (All My Children)
- 1994 Jess Walton (The Young and the Restless)
- 1995 Deidre Hall (Days of Our Lives)
- 1996 Robin Strasser (One Life to Live)
- 1997 Genie Francis (General Hospital)
- 1998 Vanessa Marcil (General Hospital)
- 1999 Lynn Herring (Port Charles)
- 2000 Kim Zimmer (The Guiding Light)
- 2001 Melody Thomas Scott (The Young and the Restless)
- 2003 Michelle Stafford (The Young and the Restless)
- 2005 Tamara Braun (General Hospital)

==== Outstanding Supporting Actor: Daytime ====
Former name Outstanding Actor in a Supporting Role in a Daytime Soap Opera, Outstanding Actor in a Supporting Role in a Daytime Serial, Outstanding Actor in a Supporting Role: Daytime

- 1984 John de Lancie (Days of Our Lives)
- 1985 John de Lancie (Days of Our Lives)
- 1986 Stephen Nichols (Days of Our Lives)
- 1988 Nicolas Coster (Santa Barbara)
- 1989 Quinn K. Redeker (The Young and the Restless)
- 1990 Robert Gentry (All My Children)
- 1991 Jordan Clarke (The Guiding Light)
- 1992 Doug Davidson (The Young and the Restless)

==== Outstanding Supporting Actress: Daytime ====
Former name: Outstanding Actress in a Supporting Role in a Daytime Soap Opera, Outstanding Actress in a Supporting Role in a Daytime Serial, Outstanding Actress in a Supporting Role: Daytime

- 1984 Lisa Trusel (Days of Our Lives)
- 1985 Arleen Sorkin (Days of Our Lives)
- 1986 Harley Jane Kozak (Santa Barbara)
- 1988 Anna Lee (General Hospital)
- 1989 Joy Garrett (Days of Our Lives)
- 1990 Jane A. Rogers (Santa Barbara)
- 1991 Julia Barr (All My Children)
- 1992 Jane Elliot (General Hospital)

==== Outstanding Supporting Actor: Prime Time ====
Former name: Outstanding Actor in a Supporting Role in a Prime Time Soap Opera, Outstanding Actor in a Supporting Role in a Prime Time Serial, Outstanding Actor in a Supporting Role: Prime Time

- 1984 Steve Kanaly (Dallas)
- 1985 Steve Kanaly (Dallas)
- 1986 Doug Sheehan (Knots Landing)
- 1988 Steve Kanaly (Dallas)
- 1989 William Devane (Knots Landing)
- 1990 Ken Kercheval (Dallas)
- 1991 Larry Riley (Knots Landing)

==== Outstanding Supporting Actress: Prime Time ====
Former name: Outstanding Actress in a Supporting Role on a Prime Time Soap Opera, Outstanding Actress in a Supporting Role in a Prime Time Serial, Outstanding Actress in a Supporting Role: Prime Time

- 1984 Lisa Hartman (Knots Landing)
- 1985 Catherine Oxenberg (Dynasty)
- 1986 Susan Howard (Dallas)
- 1988 Tonya Crowe (Knots Landing)
- 1989 Tonya Crowe (Knots Landing)
- 1990 Tonya Crowe (Knots Landing)
- 1991 Lynne Moody (Knots Landing)

==== Outstanding Supporting Actor ====
- 1993 Richard Biggs (Days of Our Lives)
- 1994 Justin Deas (The Guiding Light)
- 1995 Brad Maule (General Hospital)
- 1996 Stuart Damon (General Hospital)
- 1997 Doug Davidson (The Young and the Restless)
- 1998 Michael E. Knight (All My Children)
- 1999 Ian Buchanan (The Bold and the Beautiful)
- 2000 Jon Lindstrom (Port Charles)
- 2001 John Aniston (Days of Our Lives)
- 2003 Steve Burton (General Hospital)
- 2005 Rick Hearst (General Hospital)

==== Outstanding Supporting Actress ====
- 1993 Ellen Dolan (As the World Turns)
- 1994 Deborah Adair (Days of Our Lives)
- 1995 Signy Coleman (The Young and the Restless)
- 1996 Louise Sorel (Days of Our Lives)
- 1997 Marcy Walker (All My Children)
- 1998 Judi Evans (Another World)
- 1999 Lauralee Bell (The Young and the Restless)
- 2000 Nancy Lee Grahn (General Hospital)
- 2001 Nancy Lee Grahn (General Hospital)
- 2003 Nancy Lee Grahn (General Hospital)
- 2005 Alison Sweeney (Days of Our Lives)

==== Outstanding Villain: Daytime ====
Former name: Outstanding Villain in a Daytime Soap Opera, Outstanding Villain in a Daytime Serial

- 1984 Joseph Mascolo (Days of Our Lives)
- 1985 Joseph Mascolo (Days of Our Lives)
- 1986 John Aniston (Days of Our Lives)
- 1988 Justin Deas (Santa Barbara)
- 1989 Matthew Ashford (Days of Our Lives)
- 1990 David Canary (All My Children)
- 1991 Kin Shriner (General Hospital)
- 1992 Michael Zaslow (The Guiding Light)

==== Outstanding Villainess: Daytime ====
Former name: Outstanding Villainess in a Daytime Soap Opera, Outstanding Villainess in a Daytime Serial

- 1984 Nancy Frangione (Another World)
- 1985 Miranda Wilson (Days of Our Lives)
- 1986 Linda Gibboney (Santa Barbara)
- 1988 Brenda Dickson (The Young and the Restless)
- 1989 Lynn Herring (General Hospital)
- 1990 Jane Elliot (Days of Our Lives)
- 1991 Lynn Herring (General Hospital)
- 1992 Lynn Herring (General Hospital)

==== Outstanding Villain: Prime Time ====
Former name: Outstanding Villain in a Prime Time Soap Opera, Outstanding Villain in a PrimeTime Serial, Outstanding Villain on a Prime Time Serial

- 1984 Larry Hagman (Dallas)
- 1985 Larry Hagman (Dallas)
- 1986 Larry Hagman (Dallas)
- 1988 Larry Hagman (Dallas)
- 1989 Larry Hagman (Dallas)
- 1990 Teri Austin (Knots Landing)
- 1991 Sam Behrens (Knots Landing)

==== Outstanding Villainess: Prime Time ====
Former name: Outstanding Villainess in a Prime Time Soap Opera, Outstanding Villainess in a Prime Time Serial

- 1984 Joan Collins (Dynasty)
- 1985 Joan Collins (Dynasty)
- 1986 Donna Mills (Knots Landing)
- 1988 Donna Mills (Knots Landing)
- 1989 Donna Mills (Knots Landing)
- 1991 Michelle Phillips (Knots Landing)

==== Outstanding Villain/Villainess ====
- 1993 Kimberlin Brown (The Bold and the Beautiful) (The Young and the Restless)
- 1994 Louise Sorel (Days of Our Lives)
- 2000 Timothy Stickney (One Life to Live)

==== Favorite Villain ====
Former name: Outstanding Villain

- 1995 Jason Brooks (Days of Our Lives)
- 1996 Mark Pinter (Another World)
- 1997 Joseph Mascolo (Days of Our Lives)
- 1998 Roger Howarth (One Life to Live)
- 1999 Vincent Irizarry (All My Children)
- 2001 Rick Hearst (The Young and the Restless)
- 2005 Ted King (General Hospital)

==== Favorite Villainess ====
Former name: Outstanding Villainess

- 1995 Kimberlin Brown (The Bold and the Beautiful)
- 1996 Alison Sweeney (Days of Our Lives)
- 1997 Michelle Stafford (The Young and the Restless)
- 1998 Alison Sweeney (Days of Our Lives)
- 1999 Alison Sweeney (Days of Our Lives)
- 2001 Arianne Zucker (Days of Our Lives)

==== Outstanding Younger Lead Actor: Daytime ` ====
Former name: Outstanding Youth Actor in a Daytime Soap Opera, Outstanding Youth Actor in a Daytime Serial, Outstanding Young Leading Actor in a Daytime Serial

- 1984 David Mendenhall (General Hospital)
- 1985 Brian Autenrieth (Days of Our Lives)
- 1986 Peter Reckell (Days of Our Lives)
- 1992 Ricky Paull Goldin (Another World)

==== Outstanding Younger Leading Actress: Daytime ====
Former name: Outstanding Youth Actress in a Daytime Soap Opera, Outstanding Youth Actress in a Daytime Serial, Outstanding Young Leading Actress on a Daytime Serial

- 1984 Andrea Barber (Days of Our Lives)
- 1985 Andrea Barber (Days of Our Lives)
- 1986 Ellen Wheeler (Another World)
- 1992 Tricia Cast (The Young and the Restless)

==== Outstanding Youth Actor in Prime Time Soap Opera ====
- 1984 Omri Katz (Dallas)

==== Outstanding Youth Actress in Prime Time Soap Opera ====
- 1984 Shalane McCall (Dallas)

==== Outstanding Youth Actor/Actress in a Prime Time Serial ====
- 1985 Shalane McCall (Dallas)
- 1986 Kimberly McCullough (General Hospital)

==== Outstanding Younger Leading Actor ====
Former name: Outstanding Younger Lead Actor

- 1993 Matt Borlenghi (All My Children)
- 1994 Scott Reeves (The Young and the Restless)
- 1995 Roger Howarth (One Life to Live)
- 1996 Joshua Morrow (The Young and the Restless)
- 1997 Steve Burton (General Hospital)
- 1998 Steve Burton (General Hospital)
- 1999 Jonathan Jackson (General Hospital)
- 2000 Mark Consuelos (All My Children)
- 2001 Jason Cook (Days of Our Lives)
- 2003 Kyle Lowder (Days of Our Lives)
- 2005 Scott Clifton (General Hospital)

==== Outstanding Younger Leading Actress ====
Former name: Outstanding Younger Lead Actress

- 1993 Alicia Coppola (Another World)
- 1994 Melissa Hayden (The Guiding Light)
- 1995 Rena Sofer (General Hospital)
- 1996 Kelly Ripa (All My Children)
- 1997 Heather Tom (The Young and the Restless)
- 1998 Sarah Joy Brown (General Hospital)
- 1999 Rebecca Herbst (General Hospital)
- 2000 Kelly Ripa (All My Children)
- 2001 Alison Sweeney (Days of Our Lives)
- 2003 Rebecca Budig (All My Children)
- 2005 Eden Riegel (All My Children)

==== Favorite ====
Former name: Outstanding Teen Performer, Favorite Teen Star

- 1997 Erin Torpey (One Life to Live)
- 2000 Erin Torpey (One Life to Live)
- 2005 Kristen Alderson (One Life to Live)

==== Outstanding Child Actor ====
- 1993 Kimberly McCullough (General Hospital)
- 1994 Scott Groff (Days of Our Lives)
- 1995 Jonathan Jackson (General Hospital)
- 2001 Kirsten Storms (Days of Our Lives)

==== Outstanding Contribution by an Actor/Actress to the Form of Continuing Drama who is currently on a Daytime Serial ====
- 1986 Deidre Hall (Days of Our Lives)

==== Outstanding Hero: Daytime ====
- 1988 A Martinez (Santa Barbara)
- 1989 Stephen Nichols (Days of Our Lives)
- 1990 Doug Davidson (The Young and the Restless)
- 1991 Doug Davidson (The Young and the Restless)

==== Outstanding Heroine: Daytime ====
- 1988 Robin Wright (Santa Barbara)
- 1989 Marcy Walker (Santa Barbara)
- 1990 Finola Hughes (General Hospital)
- 1991 Cady McClain (All My Children)

==== Outstanding Hero: Prime Time ====
- 1991 Kevin Dobson (Knots Landing)

==== Outstanding Heroine: Prime Time ====
- 1991 Nicollette Sheridan (Knots Landing)

==== Outstanding Hero ====
- 2001 Joshua Morrow (The Young and the Restless)

==== Outstanding Heroine ====
- 2001 McKenzie Westmore (Passions)

==== Favorite Triangle ====
- 2005 Michael Easton, Melissa Archer, Renée Elise Goldsberry (One Life to Live)

==== Outstanding Story Line: Daytime ====
- 1990 Eden's rape (Santa Barbara)
- 1991 Robin, Anna and the alien (General Hospital)

==== Outstanding Story Line: Prime Time ====
- 1990 "Jill"'s descent into madness (Knots Landing)
- 1991 "Paige" and "Tom"'s love story (Knots Landing)

==== Outstanding Social Issue Storyline ====
- 1993 Margo's rape (As the World Turns)

==== Favorite Storyline ====
- 1994 Who Fathered Marlena's Baby? (Days of Our Lives)
- 2001 The baby switch (Days of Our Lives)

==== Favorite Song ====
- 1993 "One Dream" (Bo and Carly's theme) (Days of Our Lives)

==== Favorite Return ====
- 1999 Cady McClain (All My Children)
- 2000 Finola Hughes (All My Children)
- 2003 Vanessa Marcil (General Hospital)
- 2005 Judi Evans (Days of Our Lives)

==== Hottest Female Star ====
- 1993 Crystal Chappell (Days of Our Lives)
- 1994 Melissa Reeves (Days of Our Lives)
- 1995 Kristina Wagner (General Hospital)
- 1996 Lynn Herring (General Hospital)
- 1997 Vanessa Marcil (General Hospital)
- 1998 Sharon Case (The Young and the Restless)
- 1999 Kristian Alfonso (Days of Our Lives)

==== Hottest Male Star ====
- 1993 Mark Derwin (The Guiding Light)
- 1994 Drake Hogestyn (Days of Our Lives)
- 1995 Drake Hogestyn (Days of Our Lives)
- 1996 Peter Reckell (Days of Our Lives)
- 1997 Ingo Rademacher (General Hospital)
- 1998 Ingo Rademacher (General Hospital)
- 1999 Steve Burton (General Hospital)

==== Favorite Scene Stealer ====
Former name: Outstanding Scene Stealer

- 1994 Victoria Rowell (The Young and the Restless)
- 2000 Josh Ryan Evans (Passions)

==== Outstanding Female Scene Stealer ====
Former name: Outstanding Female Showstopper

- 1995 Louise Sorel (Days of Our Lives)
- 1996 Robin Mattson (All My Children)
- 1997 Louise Sorel (Days of Our Lives)
- 1998 Jennifer Bassey (All My Children)
- 1999 Louise Sorel (Days of Our Lives)
- 2001 Robin Strasser (Passions)

==== Outstanding Male Scene Stealer ====
Former name: Outstanding Male Showstopper

- 1995 Michael E. Knight (All My Children)
- 1996 Tuc Watkins (One Life to Live)
- 1997 Tom Eplin (Another World)
- 1998 John Ingle (General Hospital)
- 1999 Kin Shriner (Port Charles)
- 2001 Josh Ryan Evans (Passions)

==== Outstanding Musical Achievement ====
- 1994 Days of Our Lives

==== Favorite Veteran ====
- 1999 Stuart Damon (General Hospital)

==== Soapnet Outstanding Plot Twist Award ====
- Sonny & Alexis have sex (General Hospital)

==== Soapnet Diamond Award ====
- Susan Lucci

== Categories ==
- Soap Opera Digest Award for Hottest Female Star
- Soap Opera Digest Award for Hottest Male Star
- Soap Opera Digest Award for Outstanding Lead Actress in a Daytime Drama
- Soap Opera Digest Award for Outstanding Villainess in a Drama Series – Daytime

== See also ==
- List of American television awards
- List of Soap Opera Digest Awards
