= Steve Burton (actor) =

American actor (born 1970)

- Born: Jack Stephen Burton; June 28, 1970 (age 56); Indianapolis, Indiana, U.S.
- Occupation: Actor
- Years active: 1986–present
- Spouses: Sheree Gustin (m. 1999; div. 2023) Michelle Lundstrom (m. 2025)
- Children: 3
- Awards: Full list

Jack Stephen Burton (born June 28, 1970) is an American television actor. He is best known for his soap opera roles as Jason Morgan on General Hospital (1991–2012, 2017–present) and Dylan McAvoy on The Young and the Restless (2013–2017). For these performances, he has received ten Daytime Emmy Award nominations: one for Outstanding Younger Actor in a Drama Series, five for Outstanding Supporting Actor in a Drama Series (winning twice, in 1998 for General Hospital and 2017 for The Young and the Restless), and four for Outstanding Lead Actor in a Drama Series. In 2022, Burton joined the second and final season of the Days of Our Lives spin-off Beyond Salem, for which he received a nomination for Outstanding Guest Performer in a Drama Series in 2023. In 2019, he played the role of Morgan's twin brother, Drew Cain (Billy Miller) in flashbacks with Shiloh Archer (Coby Ryan McLaughlin). He also voiced Cloud Strife in various Square Enix products, including Final Fantasy VII: Advent Children and the Kingdom Hearts series.

== Early life ==
Jack Stephen Burton was born in Indianapolis, Indiana, on June 28, 1970. He grew up in the Cleveland, Ohio, suburb of Richmond Heights before moving to Hollywood and graduating from Beverly Hills High School in Beverly Hills, California.

== Career ==
Burton's first major role was as surfer Chris Fuller on Out of This World in 1987, later appearing as Harris Michaels on Days of Our Lives in 1988. In the 1990s, he studied acting at Theater Theater in Hollywood, California and was coached by Jon Cedar and Chris Aable. Burton began playing Jason Quartermaine, later renamed Jason Morgan, on the daytime soap opera General Hospital in 1991, and won a Daytime Emmy Award for Outstanding Supporting Actor in a Drama Series in 1998. In 2007, Burton also appeared as Jason in the first season of General Hospital: Night Shift.

In 2001, Burton appeared in the movie The Last Castle as Captain Peretz alongside Robert Redford and James Gandolfini; in 2002, he appeared in the science fiction miniseries Taken as Russell Keys. He was also the voice of Cloud Strife in the Kingdom Hearts and Final Fantasy series, as well as the film Final Fantasy VII: Advent Children.

On August 28, 2012, Burton confirmed that he would exit General Hospital in October. On January 29, 2013, he joined the cast of The Young and the Restless as Dylan McAvoy. On October 6, 2016, Burton announced on social media that he would not renew his deal with the series and would exit the role of Dylan. He was subsequently awarded another Daytime Emmy Award for Outstanding Supporting Actor for the role in 2017. In June 2017, ABC Daytime announced that Burton would be returning to General Hospital. In November 2021, Burton was fired from General Hospital due to his refusal to comply with the production's COVID-19 vaccine mandate. In April 2022, it was announced Burton had joined the cast of Days of Our Lives: Beyond Salem in his former role as Harris Michaels. In January 2024, he announced that he had completed filming for the role the month prior. That same month, it was announced that he would reprise the role of Jason Morgan on General Hospital.

== Personal life ==
Burton married Sheree Gustin on January 16, 1999. They had three children: daughters Makena Grace, born September 5, 2003, and Brooklyn Faith, born July 7, 2014, and son Jack Marshall, born March 26, 2006. In May 2022, Burton announced he and Gustin had separated and that he was not the father of the child Gustin was pregnant with. Burton filed for divorce in July 2022, citing March 1 as their date of separation and 'irreconcilable differences' as the reason for the divorce. The divorce was finalized in December 2023, with the couple sharing legal and joint custody of their three children, and with Burton ordered to pay Gustin child support for their minor children through April 2024. On May 17, 2025, Burton married Michelle Lundstrom after announcing their engagement in January. Lundstrom has two daughters, Lilah, born in 2011, and Hannah, born in 2014, from a previous relationship. Actor Sean Kanan is his second cousin, by marriage.

Burton appeared on High Stakes Poker season three, donating his earnings to his fan club to build a clubhouse.

== Filmography ==
Film performances
Year	Title	Role	Notes	Ref.
1986	The Manhattan Project	Local FBI Agent Ithaca		
1994	Red Sun Rising	Bar Patron		
1994	CyberTracker	Jared	Direct-to-video	
1995	CyberTracker 2	Jared		
2001	The Last Castle	Capt. Peretz		
2001	Semper Fi	Steve Russell		
2006	Final Fantasy VII: Advent Children	Cloud Strife (voice)	English version	
2009	Final Fantasy VII: Advent Children Complete	Cloud Strife (voice)	English version	

Television performances
Year	Title	Role	Notes
1987–1991	Out of This World	Chris Fuller	60 episodes
1988; 2023–2024	Days of Our Lives	Harris Micheals	Series regular
1988	Circus of the Stars	Himself	Episode: #13 Nov 25, 1988
1990	Who's the Boss?	Tim	Episode: "Her Father's Daughter"
1991–2012; 2017–2021; 2024–present	General Hospital	Jason Morgan	Series regular
1991	Secret Bodyguard	Rick	Credited as Stephen Burton
1998	Soaps' Most Unforgettable Love Stories	Jason Morgan	Television film
2002	Taken	Captain Russell Keys	3 episodes
2007	General Hospital: Night Shift	Jason Morgan	Main role (season one)
2013–2017	The Young and the Restless	Dylan McAvoy	Series regular
2022	Days of Our Lives: Beyond Salem	Harris Micheals	Chapter 2

Video games
Year	Title	Role	Notes
2002	Kingdom Hearts	Cloud Strife	English version
2006	Kingdom Hearts II	Cloud Strife	English version
2006	Dirge of Cerberus: Final Fantasy VII	Cloud Strife	English version
2007	Kingdom Hearts II: Final Mix+	Cloud Strife	English version
2008	Kingdom Hearts Re:Chain of Memories	Cloud Strife	English version
2008	Crisis Core: Final Fantasy VII	Cloud Strife	English version
2009	Dissidia Final Fantasy	Cloud Strife	English version
2011	Dissidia 012 Final Fantasy	Cloud Strife	English version
2011	Kingdom Hearts Re:coded	Cloud Strife	English version
2014	Kingdom Hearts HD 2.5 ReMIX	Cloud Strife	English version
2016	Final Fantasy Explorers	Cloud Strife	English version
2016	World of Final Fantasy	Cloud Strife	English version
2017	Mobius Final Fantasy	Cloud Strife	English version
2018	Dissidia Final Fantasy NT	Cloud Strife	English version

As writer
Year	Title	Role
2005	Laws of Gambling	Writer

As director
Year	Title	Role
2005	Laws of Gambling	Director

== Accolades ==
List of awards and nominations for Steve Burton
Year	Award	Category	Work	Result	Ref.
1997	Daytime Emmy Award	Outstanding Younger Actor in a Drama Series	General Hospital	Nominated	
1997	Soap Opera Digest Award	Outstanding Younger Lead Actor	General Hospital	Won	
1998	Daytime Emmy Award	Outstanding Supporting Actor in a Drama Series	General Hospital	Won	
1998	Soap Opera Digest Award	Outstanding Younger Lead Actor	General Hospital	Won	
1999	Soap Opera Digest Award	Hottest Male Star	General Hospital	Won	
2000	Daytime Emmy Award	Outstanding Supporting Actor in a Drama Series	General Hospital	Nominated	
2003	Soap Opera Digest Award	Outstanding Supporting Actor	General Hospital	Won	
2005	Daytime Emmy Award	Outstanding Lead Actor in a Drama Series	General Hospital	Nominated	
2014	Daytime Emmy Award	Outstanding Supporting Actor in a Drama Series	The Young and the Restless	Nominated	
2016	Daytime Emmy Award	Outstanding Supporting Actor in a Drama Series	The Young and the Restless	Nominated	
2017	Daytime Emmy Award	Outstanding Supporting Actor in a Drama Series	The Young and the Restless	Won	
2020	Daytime Emmy Award	Outstanding Lead Actor in a Drama Series	General Hospital	Nominated	
2021	Daytime Emmy Award	Outstanding Lead Actor in a Drama Series	General Hospital	Nominated	
2021	Soap Hub Award	Favorite Actor from General Hospital	General Hospital	Won	
2023	Daytime Emmy Award	Outstanding Guest Performer in a Drama Series	Beyond Salem: Chapter Two	Nominated	
2026	Daytime Emmy Award	Outstanding Lead Actor in a Drama Series	General Hospital	Nominated	

Preceded by Bryan Beck	Jason Morgan (role); 1991–2012; 2017–21; 2024–present	Succeeded by Billy Miller
Preceded by Billy Miller	Jason Morgan (role); 1991–2012; 2017–21; 2024–present	Incumbent
