= Jessica Collins =

American actress (born 1971)

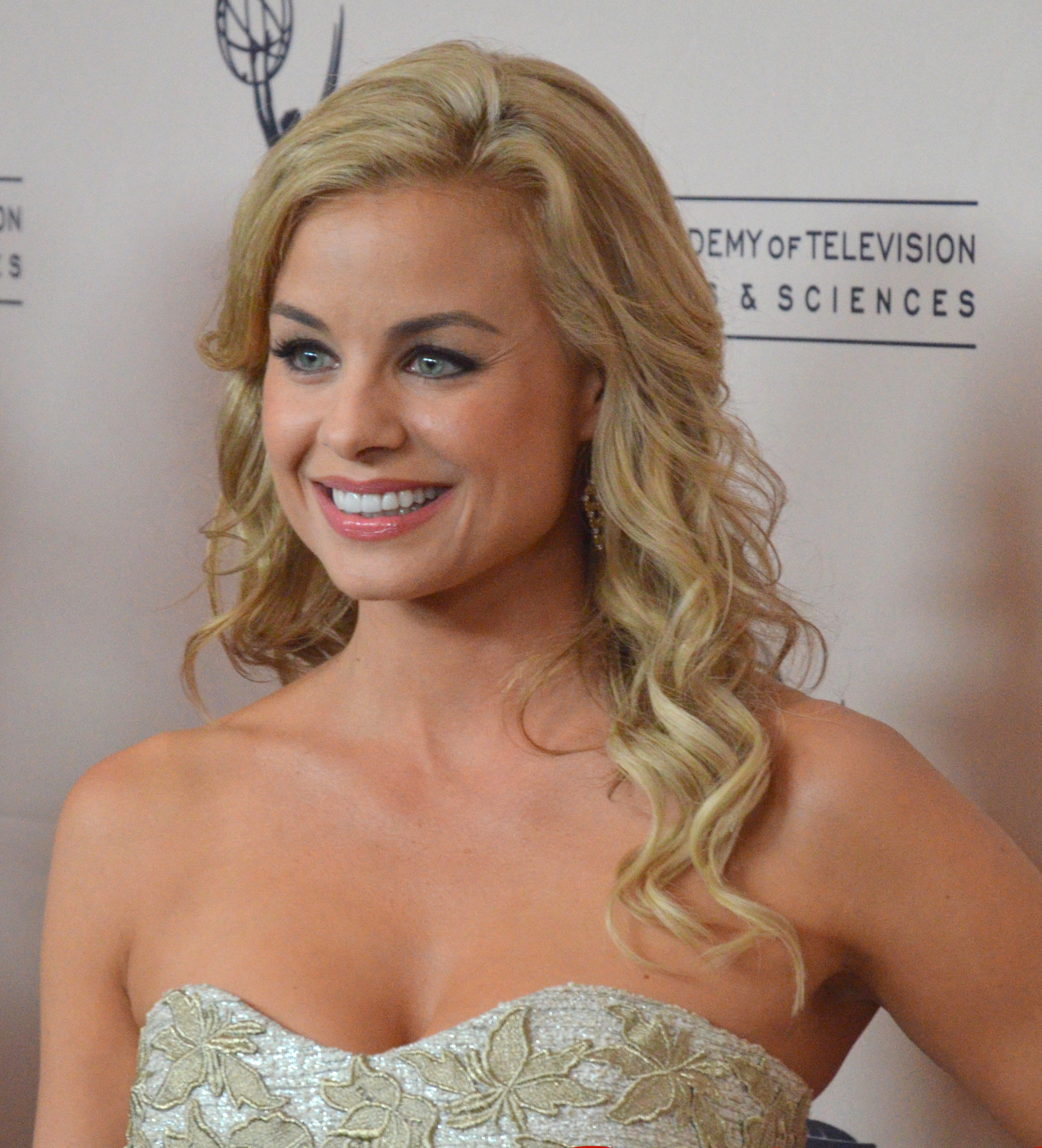
- Collins in 2013
- Born: Jessica Lynn Capogna; April 1, 1971 (age 55); Schenectady, New York, U.S.
- Occupation: Actress
- Years active: 1990-present
- Spouses: Robert Tyler (m. 1996; div. 2002) Michael Cooney (m. 2016)
- Children: 1

Jessica Collins (born Jessica Lynn Capogna; April 1, 1971) is an American actress. She is best known for portraying Dinah Lee Mayberry on the ABC soap opera Loving (1991-1994) and Avery Bailey Clark on the CBS soap opera The Young and the Restless (2011-2015), for which she won a Daytime Emmy. She also starred as Meredith Davies on Fox's Tru Calling, and appeared in recurring and guest roles in many other shows.

== Early life ==
Collins was born in Schenectady, New York. She attended Amsterdam High School in Amsterdam, New York. In 1988, she won the title Miss New York Teen USA and was the first runner-up for the Miss Teen USA Pageant in that same year. Collins later attended London's Royal National Theatre Studio and the Howard Fine Acting Studio in Los Angeles.

== Career ==
Collins starred in ABC daytime soap opera Loving as Dinah Lee Mayberry from 1991 to 1994. After leaving daytime, Collins appeared in the films Leprechaun 4: In Space (1996), Best of the Best: Without Warning (1998), and Beautiful (2000), and guest-starred in primetime shows such as Lois & Clark: The New Adventures of Superman, Star Trek: Voyager, Beverly Hills 90210, and Dawson's Creek.

Collins played Meredith Davies on the Fox Network's Tru Calling from 2003 to 2004. She had a major recurring role in the NBC period drama, American Dreams, and later appeared in the short-lived series Unscripted and Scoundrels. She also starred in the short-lived ABC comedy-drama Big Shots from 2007 to 2008. In film, Collins played roles in Ritual (2002), Catch Me If You Can (2002), Dirty Love (2005), Live! (2007), and Open House (2010). Her other television credits include CSI: Crime Scene Investigation, Two and a Half Men, Nip/Tuck, It's Always Sunny in Philadelphia, and NCIS.

In 2011, Collins returned to soaps with a role as Avery Bailey Clark on CBS's The Young and the Restless. In 2013 and 2016, she was nominated for Daytime Emmy Award for Outstanding Supporting Actress in a Drama Series for her role, winning in 2016. In May 2015, Soap Opera Digest reported that Collins was leaving the show, with Avery's last appearance airing on July 21, 2015.

Collins guest-starred on 9-1-1 and Grey's Anatomy and in 2019 starred in an episode entitled "Cracker Jack" of the Netflix anthology series, Dolly Parton's Heartstrings. In 2021, she began starring in the Apple TV+ comedy series, Acapulco.

== Personal life ==
Collins married Robert Tyler, her co-star from Loving, on November 11, 1996. The couple divorced February 15, 2002, citing irreconcilable differences.

On May 4, 2016, she married writer and producer Michael Cooney. She and Cooney have a daughter, born in January 2016.

== Filmography ==
=== Film ===
Year	Film	Role	Notes
1997	Leprechaun 4: In Space	Dr. Tina Reeves	Direct-to-video
1998	Best of the Best 4: Without Warning	Karina	Direct-to-video
2000	Beautiful	Miss Lawrenceville	
2002	Ritual	Jackie	
2002	Catch Me If You Can	Peggy	
2003	King for a Day	Mother	Short film
2005	Dirty Love	Mandy	
2007	Live!	Starlet	
2010	Open House	Lauren	

=== Television ===
Year	Title	Role	Notes
1991–1994	Loving	Dinah Lee Mayberry Alden	Regular role
1992	All My Children	Dinah Lee Mayberry Alden	Recurring/Guest role: September 23 – October 19, 1992
1994	Robin's Hoods	Celeste Fontaine / Celeste Baxter	Episode: "Unto Thyself Be True"
1994	M.A.N.T.I.S.	Corrine	Episode: "Through the Dark Circle"
1995	Coach	Bridget McDermott	Episode: "Working Girl"
1995	Renegade	Grace	Episode: "Family Ties"
1995	Lois & Clark: The New Adventures of Superman	Mindy Church	Episodes: "We Have a Lot to Talk About", "Home Is Where the Hurt Is"
1996	Diagnosis: Murder	Wendy Windsor	Episode: "A Model Murder"
1996	Life with Roger	Heather	Episode: "The Way We Was"
1997	Star Trek: Voyager	Linnis Paris	Episode: "Before and After"
1997	Beverly Hills, 90210	Jody Carlisle	Episodes: "Friends, Lovers and Children", "Child of the Night", "Deadline"
2000	Dawson's Creek	Sherry Eisler	Episode: "To Green, with Love"
2002	Off Centre	Kristi Lee	Episode: "The Good, the Bad and the Lazy"
2002	Andy Richter Controls the Universe	Leslie	Episode: "Little Andy in Charge"
2002–2003	American Dreams	Colleen	Recurring role (season 1)
2003–2004	Tru Calling	Meredith Davies	Main role (season 1)
2004	The Ranch	Kim	TV film
2005	Everwood	Cameron	Episode: "Giving Up the Girl"
2005	Unscripted	Jessica	Episodes: "1.8", "1.9", "1.10"
2005	CSI: Crime Scene Investigation	Missy	Episode: "Dog Eat Dog"
2006	Two and a Half Men	Gloria	Episode: "Walnuts and Demerol"
2007–2008	Big Shots	Marla	Regular role
2008	Gary Unmarried	Leslie	Episode: "Gary and Allison Brooks"
2009	Nip/Tuck	Tracy Pierce	Episode: "Lola Wlodkowski"
2010	Scoundrels	Valerie Bottoms	Recurring role (season 1)
2010	CSI: Miami	Marcie Westerfield	Episode: "Happy Birthday"
2011	Memphis Beat	Margo	Episode: "Troubled Water"
2011; 2013; 2019	It's Always Sunny in Philadelphia	Jackie Denardo	3 episodes
2011–2015	The Young and the Restless	Avery Bailey Clark	Regular role
2012	NCIS	Judy Ford	Episode: "Recovery"
2014	Perception	Anne-Marie Bishop	Episode: "Prologue"
2018	9-1-1	Christina Gallagher	Episode: "Heartbreaker"
2018	Grey's Anatomy	Denise	Episode: "Flowers Grow Out Of My Grave"
2019	Heartstrings	Monica	Episode: "Cracker Jack"
2021	Acapulco	Diane Davies	Main cast

== Awards and nominations ==
List of acting awards and nominations
Year	Award	Category	Title	Result	Ref.
1994	Soap Opera Digest Award	Hottest Female Star	Loving	Nominated	
1994	Soap Opera Digest Award	Outstanding Younger Lead Actress	Loving	Nominated	
2013	Daytime Emmy Award	Outstanding Supporting Actress in a Drama Series	The Young and the Restless	Nominated	
2016	Daytime Emmy Award	Outstanding Supporting Actress in a Drama Series	The Young and the Restless	Won	
