= 43rd Writers Guild of America Awards =

43rd WGA Awards
- Date: 1991
- Organized by: Writers Guild of America, East and the Writers Guild of America, West

The 43rd Writers Guild of America Awards honored the best television, and film writers of 1990. Winners were announced in 1991.

== Winners and nominees ==
=== Film ===
Winners are listed first highlighted in boldface.

| **Best Screenplay Written Directly for the Screen**: **Avalon, Written by Barry Levinson**; Alice, Written by Woody Allen; Ghost, Written by Bruce Joel Rubin; Green Card, Written by Peter Weir; Pretty Woman, Written by J.F. Lawton | **Best Screenplay Based on Material from Another Medium**: **Dances with Wolves, Screenplay by Michael Blake; based on his novel**; Awakenings, Screenplay by Steven Zaillian; based on the book by Oliver Sacks; Goodfellas, Screenplay by Nicholas Pileggi, and Martin Scorsese; based on his book; Reversal of Fortune, Screenplay by Nicholas Kazan; based on the book by Alan Dershowitz; The Grifters, Screenplay by Donald E. Westlake; based on the novel by Jim Thompson |

=== Television ===
| **Episodic Comedy**: **"Brown Like Me: Part 1 & 2" – Murphy Brown (CBS) – Diane English**; "The First Day of the Last Decade of the Entire Twentieth Century: Part 1 & 2" – Designing Women (CBS) – Linda Bloodworth-Thomason; "The Stakeout" – Seinfeld (NBC) – Larry David, and Jerry Seinfeld; "Rock 'n Roll" – The Wonder Years (ABC) – Bob Stevens; "The Powers That Be" – The Wonder Years (ABC) – David M. Stern; "Goodbye" – The Wonder Years (ABC) – Bob Brush | **Episodic Drama**: **"Souvenirs" – China Beach (ABC) – John Sacret Young**; "Warriors" – China Beach (ABC) – Martin M. Goldstein, Neal Baer, and Dottie Dartland; "Justice Swerved" – L.A. Law (NBC) – David E. Kelley, and Bryce Zabel; "Bang... Zoom... Zap" – L.A. Law (NBC) – David E. Kelley, and William M. Finkelstein; "Strangers" – Thirtysomething (ABC) – Richard Kramer; "I'm Nobody, Who Are You?" – Thirtysomething (ABC) – Winnie Holzman |
| **Daytime Serials**: **Santa Barbara (NBC) – Charles Pratt Jr., Sheri Anderson, Samuel D. Ratcliffe, Maralyn Thoma, Sam Hall, Josh Griffith, Patrick Mulcahey, Robert Guza Jr., Courtney Simon, Lynda Myles, Gary Tomlin, Frank Salisbury, Libby Beers, David J. Ross**; All My Children (ABC) – Agnes Nixon, Lorraine Broderick, Wisner Washam, Megan McTavish, Mary K. Wells, Susan Kirshenbaum Margaret DePriest, Lorraine Broderick, Victor Miller, Gillian Spencer, Elizabeth Page, Karen Lewis, Kathleen Klein, Michelle Patrick, and Elizabeth Smith | **Anthology Episode/Single Program**: **Sisters (CBS) – Shelley List, and Jonathan Estrin**; "The Strange Case of Dr. Jekyll and Mr. Hyde" – Nightmare Classics – J. Michael Straczynski; "The Ventriloquist's Dummy" – Tales from the Crypt (HBO) – Frank Darabont |
| **Original Long Form**: **The Incident (CBS) – James Norell, and Michael Norell**; Heat Wave (TNT) – Michael Lazarou | **Adapted Long Form**: **Voices Within: The Lives of Truddi Chase (ABC) – E. Jack Neuman** |
**Children's Script**: **"The Perfect Date" – ABC Afterschool Special (ABC) – Josef Anderson**; **"American Eyes" – CBS Schoolbreak Special (CBS) – Cynthia A. Cherbak, Elizabeth Hansen, and Herbert Stein**; "The Frog Girl: The Jenifer Graham Story" – CBS Schoolbreak Special (CBS) – Harry Longstreet and Renee Longstreet

==== Documentary ====
**Documentary – Current Events**
- **"Seven Days in Bensonhurst" – Frontline (PBS) – Thomas Lennon, and Shelby Steele**

=== Special awards ===
Laurel Award for Screenwriting Achievement
**Alvin Sargent**
Laurel Award for TV Writing Achievement
**Carol Sobieski**
Valentine Davies Award
**Frank Pierson**
Morgan Cox Award
**Christopher Knopf**
Paul Selvin Award
**Michael Lazarou**
Edmund J. North Award
**Daniel Taradash**
Meltzer Award
**Kirk Douglas** in recognition of his action in 1960 to ensure that Dalton Trumbo received screen credit for writing Spartacus (1960)
