= Writers Guild of America Award for Television: Long Form – Original =

Annual artistic award

- Awarded for: Outstanding Writing for a Long Form – Original
- Country: United States
- Presented by: Writers Guild of America
- First award: 1976
- Currently held by: Mare of Easttown – Brad Ingelsby (2021)
- Website: www.wga.org

The Writers Guild of America Award for Television: Long Form – Original is an award presented by the Writers Guild of America to the writers of the best long-form program not based on the previously published material of the season. It has been awarded since the 49th Annual Writers Guild of America Awards in 1996.

Through the 70s and 80s, numerous categories were presented to recognize writing for long-form programs, some of them were for anthology series or limited series while others also included television films as "long form". The divisions between original and adapted were presented in some of the categories presented during these years, though not all of them.

Since the 39th Writers Guild of America Awards in 1976, two categories are presented to recognize the writing in long form television media, these two categories remain to this day and are: Long Form – Original and Long Form – Adapted.

== Name History ==
- Best Anthology Original (1975, 1978)
- Best Original Comedy Anthology (1982-1983)
- Best Original Drama Anthology (1982-1985)
- Best Original/Adapted Comedy Anthology (1984-1985)
- Best Original/Adapted Multi-Part Long Form Series (1984)
- Best Anthology Episode/Single Program (1986-1990)
- Best Long Form - Original (1986-present)

== Winners and nominees ==
The year indicates when each season aired. Single winner of the years is left unmarked while other winners are highlighted in gold and in bold.

=== 1970s ===
Best Anthology Original

Year	Program	Writer(s)	Network	Ref.
1975
1975	Queen of the Stardust Ballroom	Jerome Kass	CBS	
1978
1978	Scott Joplin	Christopher Knopf	NBC	

=== 1980s ===
Best Original Comedy Anthology

Year	Program	Writer(s)	Network	Ref.
1982
1982	Sidney Shorr: A Girl's Best Friend	Oliver Hailey and Marilyn Canton Baker	NBC	
1983
1983	The Other Woman	Lila Garrett and Anne Meara	CBS	

Best Original Drama Anthology

Year	Program	Writer(s)	Network	Ref.
1982
1982	Skokie	Ernest Kinoy	CBS	
1983
1983	Special Bulletin	Marshall Herskovitz and Edward Zwick	NBC	
1984
1984	**The Day After**	**David Hume**	**ABC**	
1984	Pope John Paul II	Christopher Knopf	CBS	
1985
1985	**Do You Remember Love**	**Vickie Patik**	**CBS**	
1985	Not My Kid	Christopher Knopf and Beth Polson	CBS	

Best Original/Adapted Comedy Anthology

Year	Program	Writer(s)	Source material	Network	Ref.
1984
1984	Hobson's Choice	Burt Prelutsky	Original TV movie	CBS	
1985
1985	The Ratings Game	Michael Barrie and Jim Mulholland	Original TV movie	Showtime	

Best Original/Adapted Multi-Part Long Form Series

Year	Program	Writer(s)	Source material	Network	Ref.
1983
1983	**Blood Feud** **"Part II"**	**Robert Boris**	**Original TV movie**	**Syndicated**	
1983	V "Part I"	Kenneth Johnson	Original miniseries	NBC	
1984
1984	The First Olympics: Athens 1896	Charles Gary Allison and William Bast	Original miniseries	NBC	

Best Anthology Episode/Single Program

Year	Program	Episode	Writer(s)	Network	Ref.
1986
1986	**The Twilight Zone**	**"Teacher's Aide"/"Paladin of the Lost Hour"**	**Harlan Ellison**	**CBS**	
1986	Amazing Stories	"The Doll"	Richard Matheson	NBC	
1986	The Twilight Zone	"A Day in Beaumont"/"The Last Defender of Camelot"	George R. R. Martin	CBS	
1986	The Twilight Zone	"Her Pilgrim Soul"/"I of Newton"	Alan Brennert	CBS	
1987
1987	**There Were Times, Dear**		**Harry Cauley**	**PBS**	
1987	The Twilight Zone	"The Storyteller"/"Nightsong"	Rockne S. O'Bannon	CBS	
1987	The Twilight Zone	"The Card"/"The Junction"	Virginia Aldridge	CBS	
1987	American Playhouse	"A Mistaken Charity"	Lawrence DuKore, C.R. Portz	PBS	
1987	Tales from the Darkside	"Everybody Needs a Little Love"	John Harrison	Syndicated	
1988
1988	**Great Performances**	**"Tales from the Hollywood Hills: Natica Jackson"**	**Andy Wolk**	**PBS**	
1988	Alfred Hitchcock Presents	"There Was a Little Girl..."	Charlie Grant Craig	NBC	
1988	CBS Summer Playhouse	"Mad Avenue"	Christopher Knopf and David A. Simons	CBS	
1989
1989	**Great Performances**	**"Tales from the Hollywood Hills: The Closed Set"**	**Ellen M. Violett**	**PBS**	
1989	The Cosby Show	"The Birth"	John Markus, Carmen Finestra, and Gary Kott	NBC	
1989	The Twilight Zone	"Father and Son Game"	Jeremy Bertrand Finch, and Paul Chitlik	Syndicated	
1989	The Twilight Zone	"Street of Shadows"	Michael Reaves	Syndicated	

Best Long Form - Original

Year	Program	Writer(s)	Network	Ref.
1986
1986	**Nobody's Child**	**Mary Gallagher and Ara Watson**	**CBS**	
1986	**The Execution of Raymond Graham**	**Mel Frohman**	**ABC**	
1986	Unnatural Causes	John Sayles, Martin M. Goldstein, Stephen Doran, Robert Jacobs	NBC	
1986	Miles to Go...	Beverly Levitt, Stuart Fischoff	CBS	
1986	The Return of Sherlock Holmes	Bob Shayne	CBS	
1987
1987	Not awarded			
1988
1988	**God Bless the Child**	**Dennis Nemec**	**ABC**	
1988	My Father, My Son	Jacqueline Feather and David Seidler	CBS	
1988	The Taking of Flight 847: The Uli Derickson Story	Norman Morrill	NBC	
1989
1989	**Nightbreaker**	**T.S. Cook**	**TNT**	

=== 1990s ===
Best Anthology Episode/Single Program

Year	Program	Episode	Writer(s)	Network	Ref.
1990
1990	**Sisters**		**Shelley List, and Jonathan Estrin**	**CBS**	
1990	Nightmare Classics	"The Strange Case of Dr. Jekyll and Mr. Hyde"	J. Michael Straczynski	Showtime	
1990	Tales from the Crypt	"The Ventriloquist's Dummy"	Frank Darabont	HBO	

Best Long Form - Original

Year	Program	Writer(s)	Network	Ref.
1990
1990	**The Incident**	**James Norell, and Michael Norell**	**CBS**	
1990	Heat Wave	Michael Lazarou	TNT	
1991
1991	**Judgment**	**Tom Topor**	**HBO**	
1992
1992	**Homefront** **"S.N.A.F.U."**	**Lynn Marie Latham, and Bernard Lechowick**	**ABC**	
1993
1993	**The Positively True Adventures of the Alleged Texas Cheerleader-Murdering Mom**	**Jane Anderson**	**HBO**	
1994
1994	**Witness to the Execution**	**Thomas Baum, Keith Pierce, and Priscilla Prestwidge**	**NBC**	
1994	Lily in Winter	Julie Moskowitz, Robert Elsele, Gary Stephens, and J. Michael Riva	USA Network	
1995
1995	**ER** **"24 Hours"**	**Michael Crichton**	**NBC**	
1995	A Father for Charlie	H. Haden Yelin	CBS	
1995	Lily in Winter	Julie Moskowitz, Robert Elsele, Gary Stephens, and J. Michael Riva	USA Network	
1995	Serving in Silence: The Margarethe Cammermeyer Story	Alison Cross	NBC	
1996
1996	**Harvest of Fire**	**Susan Nanus and Richard Alfieri**	**CBS**	
1996	Andersonville	David W. Rintels	TNT	
1996	Hidden in Silence	Stephanie Liss	Lifetime	
1996	Stolen Memories: Secrets from the Rose Garden	Tim Cagney	The Family Channel	
1997
1997	**The Summer of Ben Tyler**	**Robert Inman**	**CBS**	
1997	Dark Skies	Bryce Zabel, Brent V. Friedman	NBC	
1997	Hidden in America	Peter Silverman and Michael De Guzma	Showtime	
1998
1998	**Labor of Love**	**Nina Shengold**	**Lifetime**	
1998	Blind Faith	Frank Military	Showtime	
1998	Color of Justice	Lionel Chetwynd	Showtime	
1998	Gia	Jay McInerney and Michael Cristofer	HBO	
1999
1999	**Dash and Lilly**	**Jerry Ludwig**	**A&E**	
1999	Aldrich Ames: Traitor Within	Michael Burton	Showtime	
1999	Freak City	Jane Shepard	Showtime	
1999	Purgatory	Gordon T. Dawson	TNT	

=== 2000s ===
Year	Program	Writer(s)	Network	Ref.
2000
2000	**Freedom Song**	**Phil Alden Robinson and Stanley Weiser**	**TNT**	
2000	**Sally Hemings: An American Scandal** **"Part I"**	**Tina Andrews**	**CBS**	
2000	If You Believe	Anthea Sylbert and Richard Romanus	Lifetime	
2000	The Truth About Jane	Lee Rose	Lifetime	
2001
2001	**Conspiracy**	**Loring Mandel**	**HBO**	
2001	Varian's War	Lionel Chetwynd	Showtime	
2001	61*	Hank Steinberg	HBO	
2001	For Love or Country: The Arturo Sandoval Story	Timothy J. Sexton	HBO	
2002
2002	**The Gathering Storm**	**Larry Ramin and Hugh Whitemore**	**HBO**	
2002	Door to Door	William H. Macy and Steven Schachter	TNT	
2002	My Beautiful Son	Tim Kazurinsky	Showtime	
2002	Sins of the Father	John Pielmeier	FX	
2003
2003	**And Starring Pancho Villa as Himself**	**Larry Gelbart**	**HBO**	
2003	Julius Caesar	Peter Pruce and Craig Warner	TNT	
2003	Wilder Days	Jeff Stockwell	TNT	
2003	Taken "Beyond the Sky", "Jacob and Jesse"	Leslie Bohem	Sci-Fi Channel	
2004
2004	**Something the Lord Made**	**Peter Silverman and Robert Caswell**	**HBO**	
2004	Redemption: The Stan Tookie Williams Story	J.T. Allen	FX	
2004	Spinning Boris	Yuri Zeltser and Grace Cary Bickley	Showtime	
2005
2005	**Warm Springs**	**Margaret Nagle**	**HBO**	
2005	Dirt	Richard Guay and Nancy Savoca	Showtime	
2005	The Librarian: Quest for the Spear	David Titcher	TNT	
2005	The Reading Room	Randy Feldman	Hallmark Channel	
2006
2006	**Flight 93**	**Nevin Schreiner**	**A&E**	
2006	Broken Trail	Alan Geoffrion	AMC	
2006	The Ron Clark Story	Annie deYoung and Max Enscoe	TNT	
2007
2007	**Pandemic**	**Bryce Zabel and Jackie Zabel**	**Hallmark Channel**	
2007	The Lost Room	Christopher Leone, Laura Harkcom and Paul Workman	Syfy Channel	
2008
2008	**Recount**	**Danny Strong**	**HBO**	
2008	An American Crime	Tommy O'Haver	Showtime	
2008	Fringe "Pilot"	J. J. Abrams, Alex Kurtzman and Roberto Orci	Fox	
2009
2009	**Georgia O’Keeffe**	**Michael Cristofer**	**Lifetime**	
2009	Grey Gardens	Michael Sucsy and Patricia Rozema	HBO	
2009	Pedro	Dustin Lance Black and Paris Barclay	MTV	

=== 2010s ===
Year	Program	Writer(s)	Network	Ref.
2010
2010	**The Special Relationship**	**Peter Morgan**	**HBO**	
2010	You Don't Know Jack	Adam Mazer	HBO	
2011
2011	**Cinema Verite**	**David Seltzer**	**HBO**	
2011	Five	Deirdre O'Connor, Stephen Godchaux, Howard Morris, Jill Gordon, Wendy West	Lifetime	
2012
2012	**Hatfields & McCoys** **"Part 2", "Part 3"**	**Bill Kerby, Ted Mann, and Ronald Parker**	**History**	
2012	Hemingway & Gellhorn	Jerry Stahl and Barbara Turner	HBO	
2012	Political Animals "Pilot"	Greg Berlanti	USA	
2013
2013	Not awarded			
2014
2014	**Deliverance Creek**	**Melissa Carter**	**Lifetime**	
2014	Return to Zero	Sean Hanish	Lifetime	
2015
2015	**Saints & Strangers**	**Seth Fisher, Walon Green, Chip Johannessen, and Eric Overmyer**	**Nat Geo**	
2015	American Horror Story: Hotel	Brad Falchuk, John J. Gray, Todd Kubrak, Crystal Liu, Ned Martel, Tim Minear, Ryan Murphy, Jennifer Salt, and James Wong	FX	
2015	Flesh and Bone	Bronwyn Garrity, Jami O'Brien, Adam Rapp, Moira Walley-Beckett, and David Wiener	Starz	
2015	Sons of Liberty	Stephen David, Kirk Ellis, and David C. White	History	
2016
2016	**Confirmation**	**Susannah Grant**	**HBO**	
2016	American Crime	Julie Hébert, Sonay Hoffman, Keith Huff, Stacy A. Littlejohn, Kirk A. Moore, Davy Perez and Diana Son	ABC	
2016	Harley and the Davidsons	Seth Fisher, Nick Schenk and Evan Wright	Discovery Channel	
2016	Surviving Compton: Dre, Suge & Michel'le	Dianne Houston	Lifetime	
2017
2017	**Flint**	**Barbara Stepansky**	**Lifetime**	
2017	American Horror Story: Cult	Brad Falchuk, John J. Gray, Joshua Green, Todd Kubrak, Crystal Liu, Ned Martel, Tim Minear, Ryan Murphy, Adam Penn and James Wong	FX	
2017	Feud: Bette and Joan	Jaffe Cohen, Sonay Hoffman, Tim Minear, Ryan Murphy, Gina Welch and Michael Zam	FX	
2017	Godless	Scott Frank	Netflix	
2017	Manhunt: Unabomber	Jim Clemente, Tony Gittelson, Max Hurwitz, Steven Katz, Nick Schenk, Andrew Sodroski and Nick Towne	Discovery	
2018
2018	**Castle Rock**	**Marc Bernardin, Scott Brown, Lila Byock, Mark Lafferty, Sam Shaw, Dustin Thomason, Gina Welch and Vinnie Wilhelm**	**Hulu**	
2018	My Dinner with Hervé	Sacha Gervasi and Sean Macaulay	HBO	
2018	Paterno	Debora Cahn and John C. Richards	HBO	
2019
2019	**Chernobyl**	**Craig Mazin**	**HBO**	
2019	True Detective	Nic Pizzolatto, David Milch, Alessandra DiMona, Graham Gordy and Gabriel Hobson	HBO	
2019	The Terror: Infamy	Max Borenstein, Naomi Iizuka, Tony Tost, Alexander Woo, Alessandra DiMona, Shannon Goss, Steven Hanna, Benjamin Klein and Danielle Roderick	AMC	
2019	Togo	Tom Flynn	Disney+	

=== 2020s ===
Year	Program	Writer(s)	Network	Ref.
2020
2020	**Mrs. America**	**Tanya Barfield, Joshua Allen Griffith, Sharon Hoffman, Boo Killebrew, Micah Schraft, April Shih, Dahvi Waller**	**FX**	
2020	Dirty John: The Betty Broderick Story	Aaron Carew, Alexandra Cunningham, Lex Edness, Kevin J. Hynes, Juliet Lashinsky-Revene, Stacy A. Littlejohn, Katherine B. McKenna	USA Network	
2020	Hollywood	Ian Brennan, Janet Mock, Ryan Murphy, Reilly Smith	Netflix	
2020	Safety	Nick Santora	Disney+	
2020	Uncle Frank	Alan Ball	Amazon	
2021
2021	**Mare of Easttown**	**Brad Ingelsby**	**HBO**	
2021	American Horror Story: Double Feature	Brad Falchuk, Manny Coto, Ryan Murphy, Kristen Reidel, Reilly Smith	FX	
2021	The White Lotus	Mike White	HBO	
2021	Midnight Mass	James Flanagan, Mike Flanagan, Elan Gale, Jeff Howard, Dani Parker	Netflix	
2021	Them: Covenant	Christina Ham, Little Marvin, David Matthews, Dominic Orlando, Seth Zvi Rosenfeld, Francine Volpe	Prime Video	
