= 39th Writers Guild of America Awards =

39th WGA Awards
- Date: 1987
- Organized by: Writers Guild of America, East and the Writers Guild of America, West

The 39th Writers Guild of America Awards honored the best television, and film writers of 1986. Winners were announced in 1987.

== Winners and nominees ==
=== Film ===
Winners are listed first highlighted in boldface.

**Best Screenplay Written Directly for the Screen**: **Hannah and Her Sisters, Written by Woody Allen**; Blue Velvet, Written by David Lynch; Mona Lisa, Written by Neil Jordan, and David Leland; Platoon, Written by Oliver Stone; Salvador, Written by Oliver Stone, and Richard Boyle	**Best Screenplay Based on Material from Another Medium**: **A Room with a View, Screenplay by Ruth Prawer Jhabvala; based on the novel by E.M. Forster**; Children of a Lesser God, Screenplay by Hesper Anderson, and Mark Medoff; based on the stage play by Mark Medoff; Down and Out in Beverly Hills, Screenplay by Paul Mazursky, and Leon Capetanos; based on the play by René Fauchois; Little Shop of Horrors, Screenplay by Howard Ashman; based on his musical play, and the 1960 screenplay by Charles B. Griffith; Stand by Me, Screenplay by Raynold Gideon, and Bruce A. Evans; based on the novel by Stephen King

=== Television ===
**Episodic Comedy**: **"Allie's Affair" – Kate & Allie (CBS) – Bob Randall**; "I Can't Say No" – All Is Forgiven (NBC) – Ian Praiser, and Howard Gewirtz; "Best of Friends" – Night Court (NBC) – Howard Ostroff; "Theo's Holiday" – The Cosby Show (NBC) – John Markus, Carmen Finestra, and Matt Williams; "Blanche and the Younger Man" – The Golden Girls (NBC) – James Berg, and Stan Zimmerman	**Episodic Drama**: **"The Dream Sequence Always Rings Twice" – Moonlighting (ABC) – Debra Frank, and Carl Sautter**; **Remembrance of Things Past" – St. Elsewhere (NBC) – John Masius, Bruce Paltrow, and Tom Fontana**; "What Are Friends For?" – Hill Street Blues (NBC) – Dick Wolf; "Remembrance of Hits Past" – Hill Street Blues (NBC) – Walon Green, Jeffrey Lewis, and David Milch; "Every Daughter's Father Is a Virgin" – Moonlighting (ABC) – Bruce Franklin Singer
**Daytime Serials**: **Ryan's Hope (ABC) – Tom King, Millee Taggart, William Burritt, Mardee Kravit, Eleanor Mancusi, Maura Penders, B.K. Perlman, Dorothy Ann Purser, Erik Wiklund, Claire Labine**; One Life to Live (ABC) – Peggy O'Shea, S. Michael Schnessel, Craig Carlson, Lanie Bertram, Ethel Brez, Mel Brez, Lloyd 'Lucky' Gold, George Lefferts, Peter Swet, Don Wallace	**Anthology Episode/Single Program**: **"Teacher's Aide/Paladin of the Lost" – The Twilight Zone (CBS) – Harlan Ellison**; "The Doll" – Amazing Stories (NBC) – Richard Matheson; "A Day in Beaumont/The Last Defender of Camelot" – The Twilight Zone (CBS) – George R.R. Martin; "Her Pilgrim Soul/I of Newton – The Twilight Zone (CBS) – Alan Brennert
**Long Form – Original**: **Nobody's Child (CBS) – Mary Gallagher, and Ara Watson**; **The Execution of Raymond Graham (ABC) – Mel Frohman**; Unnatural Causes (NBC) – John Sayles, Martin M. Goldstein, Stephen Doran, and Robert Jacobs; Miles to Go... (CBS) – Beverly Levitt, and Stuart Fischoff; The Return of Sherlock Holmes (CBS) – Bob Shayne	**Long Form – Adapted**: **Peter the Great (NBC) – Edward Anhalt**; Trapped in Silence – Vickie Patik
**Children's Show**: **"Maricela" – Wonderworks (PBS) – Nancy Audley, Christine Burrill, and Richard Soto**; "Babies Having Babies" – CBS Schoolbreak Special (CBS) – Kathryn J. Montgomery, and Jeffrey Auerbach; "Fuzz Bucket" – Wonderful World of Disney (ABC) – Mick Garris; "Time Flyer" – Wonderful World of Disney (ABC) – Mark Rosman

=== Special awards ===
Laurel Award for Screenwriting Achievement
**Woody Allen**
Laurel Award for TV Writing Achievement
**Reginald Rose**
Valentine Davies Award
**William Froug**
Morgan Cox Award
**Jean Rouverol**
