= 40th Writers Guild of America Awards =

40th WGA Awards
- Date: 1988
- Organized by: Writers Guild of America, East and the Writers Guild of America, West

The 40th Writers Guild of America Awards honored the best television, and film writers of 1987. Winners were announced in 1988.

== Winners and nominees ==
=== Film ===
Winners are listed first highlighted in boldface.

**Best Screenplay Written Directly for the Screen**: **Moonstruck, Written by John Patrick Shanley**; Broadcast News, Written by James L. Brooks; Hope and Glory, Written by John Boorman; Radio Days, Written by Woody Allen; The Last Emperor, Written by Mark Peploe, and Bernardo Bertolucci	**Best Screenplay Based on Material from Another Medium**: **Roxanne, Screenplay by Steve Martin; based on the play by Edmond Rostand**; Full Metal Jacket, Screenplay by Stanley Kubrick, Michael Herr, and Gustav Hasford; based on the novel "The Short Timers" by Gustav Hasford; Fatal Attraction, Screenplay by James Dearden; based on his short film; The Princess Bride, Screenplay by William Goldman; based on the book by William Goldman; The Untouchables, Screenplay by David Mamet; based on the book by Oscar Fraley, and Eliot Ness

=== Television ===
**Episodic Comedy**: **"A, My Name Is Alex" – Family Ties (NBC) – Gary David Goldberg, and Alan Uger**; **"Here's Why Cosmetics Should Come in Unbreakable Bottles" – The Days and Nights of Molly Dodd (NBC) – Jay Tarses**; **"Twas the Nightmare Before Christmas" – The Golden Girls (NBC) – Barry Fanaro, and Mort Nathan**; "Never Love a Goalie: Part I – Cheers (NBC) – Ken Levine, and David Isaacs; "My Back Pages" – Family Ties (NBC) – Ruth Bennett; "Contempt of Courting" – Night Court (NBC) – Tom Straw; "A Piece of Cake" – The Golden Girls (NBC) – Kathy Speer, Terry Grossman, Mort Nathan, and Barry Fanaro	**Episodic Drama**: **"Turn, Turn, Turn: Part 1" – Cagney & Lacey (CBS) – Georgia Jeffries**; **"It's a Wonderful Job" – Moonlighting (ABC) – Debra Frank, and Carl Sautter**; "More Skinned Against Than Skinning" – Hill Street Blues (NBC) – David Black; "Fathers and Guns" – Hill Street Blues (NBC) – Jeffrey Lewis, and Jerry Patrick Brown; "The Venus Butterfly" – L.A. Law (NBC) – Steven Bochco, and Terry Louise Fisher; "Fry Me to the Moon" – L.A. Law (NBC) – Jacob Epstein, Marshall Goldberg, and David E. Kelley; "Big Man on Mulberry Street" – Moonlighting (ABC) – Karen Hall; "Atomic Shakespeare" – Moonlighting (ABC) – Ron Osborn, and Jeff Reno; "A Room with a View" – St. Elsewhere (NBC) – Channing Gibson, John Masius, and Tom Fontana
**Daytime Serials**: **Ryan's Hope (ABC) – Claire Labine, Eleanor Mancusi, William Burritt, Madeline B. David, Steve Lehrman, David Appel**; Days of Our Lives (NBC) – Sheri Anderson, Leah Laiman, Anne Schoettle, Thom Racina, M.M. Shelly Moore, Dena Higley, Richard J. Allen, Linda Campanelli, Maralyn Thoma, Michelle Poteet Lisanti, Peggi Schibi, Penina Spiegel, Ted Kubiak	**Anthology Episode/Single Program**: **There Were Times, Dear – Harry Cauley**; "A Mistaken Charity" – American Playhouse (PBS) – Lawrence DuKore, and C.R. Portz; "Everybody Needs a Little Love" – Tales from the Darkside (Paramount Television) – John Harrison; "The Storyteller/Nightsong" – The Twilight Zone (CBS) – Rockne S. O'Bannon; "The Card/The Junction" – The Twilight Zone (CBS) – Virginia Aldridge
**Long Form – Original**	**Adapted Long Form**: **Escape from Sobibor (CBS) – Reginald Rose**; Prison for Children (CBS) – Christopher Knopf
**Children's Show**: **"An Enemy Among Us" – CBS Schoolbreak Special (CBS) – Joseph Maurer**; "Juvi" – CBS Schoolbreak Special (CBS) – Joanna Lee; "Young Harry Houdini" – Wonderful World of Disney (ABC) – James Orr	**Variety – Musical, Award, Tribute, Special Event**: **Will Rogers: Look Back in Laughter – Bennet Tramer**; 19th Annual NAACP Image Award – Daryl G. Nickens, Rita Cash, and Royce Osborn Jr.

==== Documentary ====
**Documentary – Other than Current Events**
- **The Grizzlies (PBS) – Theodore Thomas**

=== Special awards ===
Laurel Award for Screenwriting Achievement
**Harriet Frank Jr., and Irving Ravetch**
Laurel Award for TV Writing Achievement
**Bob Schiller, and Bob Weiskopf**
Valentine Davies Award
**Lois Preyser**
Morgan Cox Award
**Daniel Taradash**
