= 41st Writers Guild of America Awards =

41st WGA Awards
- Date: 1989
- Organized by: Writers Guild of America, East and the Writers Guild of America, West

The 41st Writers Guild of America Awards honored the best television, and film writers of 1988. Winners were announced in 1989.

== Winners and nominees ==
=== Film ===
Winners are listed first highlighted in boldface.

**Best Screenplay Written Directly for the Screen**: **Bull Durham, Written by Ron Shelton**; A Fish Called Wanda, Written by John Cleese, and Charles Crichton; Big, Written by Gary Ross, and Anne Spielberg; Rain Man, Written by Ronald Bass, and Barry Morrow; story by Barry Morrow; Working Girl, Written by Kevin Wade	**Best Screenplay Based on Material from Another Medium**: **Dangerous Liaisons, Screenplay by Christopher Hampton; based on the novel by Choderlos de Laclos**; Gorillas in the Mist, Screenplay by Anna Hamilton Phelan, and Tan Murphy; based on the work by Dian Fossey, and the article of Harold T.P. Hayes; The Accidental Tourist, Screenplay by Frank Galati, and Lawrence Kasdan; based on the book by Anne Tyler; The Unbearable Lightness of Being, Screenplay by Jean-Claude Carrière, and Philip Kaufman; based on the novel by Milan Kundera; Who Framed Roger Rabbit, Screenplay by Jeffrey Price, and Peter S. Seaman; based on the novel by Gary K. Wolf

=== Television ===
**Episodic Comedy**: **"My Father's Office" – The Wonder Years (ABC) – Carol Black, and Neal Marlens**; "The Way We Were" – Family Ties (NBC) – Gary David Goldberg; "No Hard Feelings" – Night Court (NBC) – Tom Straw; "Old Friends" – The Golden Girls (NBC) – Kathy Speer, and Terry Grossman; "Episode #1.1." – The Slap Maxwell Story (ABC) – Jay Tarses; "Pilot" – The Wonder Years (ABC) – Neal Marlens, and Carol Black	**Episodic Drama**: **"Therapy" – Thirtysomething (ABC) – Susan Shilliday**; "Thirtysomething" – Thirtysomething (ABC) – Marshall Herskovitz, and Edward Zwick; "Home" – China Beach (ABC) – William Broyles Jr.; "Full Marital Jacket" – L.A. Law (NBC) – Terry Louise Fisher, David E. Kelley, and Steven Bochco; "A Moon for the Misbegotten" – St. Elsewhere (NBC) – Tom Fontana, John Tinker, and Channing Gibson; "Nice Work If You Can Get It" – Thirtysomething (ABC) – Paul Haggis, and Jean Vallely
**Daytime Serials**: **Ryan's Hope (ABC) – Claire Labine, Eleanor Mancusi, William Burritt, Madeline B. David, Dave Appell, Rocco Bufano, Matt Labine**; Guiding Light (CBS) – Pamela K. Long, Nancy Williams Watt, Stephen Demorest, Trent Jones, Melissa Salmons, Pete T. Rich, Nancy Curlee, N. Gail Lawrence, Richard Culliton, Nancy Franklin	**Anthology Episode/Single Program**: **"Tales from the Hollywood Hills: Natica Jackson" – Great Performances – Andy Wolk**; "There Was a Little Girl (Daddy's Girl) – Alfred Hitchcock Presents (NBC) – Charles Grant Craig; "Mad Avenue" – CBS Summer Playhouse (CBS) – Christopher Knopf, and David A. Simons
**Original Long Form**: **God Bless the Child (ABC) – Dennis Nemec**; My Father, My Son (CBS) – Jacqueline Feather, and David Seidler; The Taking of Flight 847: The Uli Derickson Story (NBC) – Norman Morrill	**Adapted Long Form**: **"Foxfire" – Hallmark Hall of Fame (CBS) – Susan Cooper**; **"Part 1" – Onassis: The Richest Man in the World (ABC) – Jacqueline Feather, and David Seidler**; A Friendship of Vienna (NBC) – Richard Alfieri
**Children's Show**: **"The Secret Garden" – Hallmark Hall of Fame (CBS) – Blanche Hanalis**; "Just a Regular Kid: An AIDS Story" – ABC Afterschool Special (ABC) – Victoria Hochberg; "The Kid Who Wouldn't Quit: The Brad Silverman Story" – ABC Afterschool Special (ABC) – Joanna Lee; "Gangs" – CBS Schoolbreak Special (CBS) – Paul W. Cooper; "Home Sweet Homeless" – CBS Schoolbreak Special (CBS) – Kathryn J. Montgomery; A Mouse, A Mystery and Me (NBC) – Everett Greenbaum, Harvey Bullock, Jim Shorts and Chris Solada	**Variety – Musical, Award, Tribute, Special Event**: **A Muppet Family Christmas – Jerry Juhl**; Family Comedy Hour – Jack Elinson, Jay Leno, Marvin Silbermintz, Jay Teitzell, Ted Herrmann, Wayne Kline

==== Documentary ====
**Documentary – Current Events**: **"Apartheid Part 5: 1987" – Frontline (PBS) – Irv Drasnin**	**Documentary – Other than Current Events**: **George Stevens: A Filmmaker's Journey (ABC) – George Stevens Jr.**

=== Special awards ===
Laurel Award for Screenwriting Achievement
**Ring Lardner Jr.**
Laurel Award for TV Writing Achievement
**Hal Kanter**
Valentine Davies Award
**Garson Kanin, and Michael Kanin**
Morgan Cox Award
**Robert I. Holt**
