= Writers Guild of America Award for Television: Long Form – Adapted =

- Awarded for: Outstanding Writing for a Long Form – Adapted
- Country: United States
- Presented by: Writers Guild of America
- First award: 1976
- Currently held by: Maid – Bekah Brunstetter, Marcus Gardley, Michelle Denise Jackson, Colin McKenna, Molly Smith Metzler (2021)
- Website: www.wga.org

The Writers Guild of America Award for Television: Long Form – Adapted is an award presented by the Writers Guild of America to the writers of the best long form program based on the previously published material or work of the season. It has been awarded since the 50th Annual Writers Guild of America Awards in 1996.

Through the 70s and 80s, numerous categories were presented to recognize writing for long-form programs, some of them were for anthology series or limited series while others also included television films as "long form". The divisions between original and adapted were presented in some of the categories presented during these years, though not all of them.

Since the 39th Writers Guild of America Awards in 1976, two categories are presented to recognize the writing in long form television media, these two categories remain to this day and are: Long Form – Original and Long Form – Adapted.

== Name history ==
- Best Anthology Adaptation (1979)
- Best Multi-Part Long Form Series and/or Any Production of More Than Two Parts (1978-1979)
- Best Adapted Drama Anthology (1082-1985)
- Best Original/Adapted Comedy Anthology (1984-1985)
- Best Original/Adapted Multi-Part Long Form Series (1984)
- Best Long Form - Adapted (1986-present)

== Winners and nominees ==
The year indicates that each ceremony honored the programs of that year. Single winner of the year is left unmarked, while other winners which also have nominees are highlighted in gold and in bold.

=== 1970s ===
Best Anthology Adaptation

Year	Program	Writer(s)	Source material	Network	Ref.
1978
1978	A Christmas to Remember	Stewart Stern	The novel The Melodeon by Glendon Swarthout	CBS	
1978	A Woman Called Moses	Lonne Elder III	The book by Marcy Heidish	NBC	

Best Multi-Part Long Form Series and/or Any Production of More Than Two Parts

Year	Program	Writer(s)	Source material	Network	Ref.
1978
1978	Centennial "Only The Rocks Live Forever"	John Wilder	The novel by James A. Michener	NBC	
1979
1979	Backstairs at the White House	Gwen Bagni and Paul Dubov	The novel My Thirty Years Backstairs at the White House by Lillian Rogers Parks	NBC	

=== 1980s ===
Best Adapted Drama Anthology

Year	Program	Writer(s)	Source material	Network	Ref.
1982
1982	Of Mice and Men	E. Nick Alexander	The novel by John Steinbeck	NBC	
1983
1983	For Us the Living: The Medgar Evers Story	Ossie Davis and Ken Rotcop	The book by Myrlie Evers-Williams and William Peters	PBS	
1984
1984	The Dollmaker	Susan Cooper and Hume Cronyn	The novel by Harriette Simpson Arnow	ABC	
1985
1985	The Burning Bed	Rose Leiman Goldemberg	The novel by Faith McNulty	NBC	

Best Original/Adapted Comedy Anthology

Year	Program	Writer(s)	Source material	Network	Ref.
1984
1984	Hobson's Choice	Burt Prelutsky	Original TV movie	CBS	
1985
1985	The Ratings Game	Michael Barrie and Jim Mulholland	Original TV movie	Showtime	

Best Original/Adapted Multi-Part Long Form Series

Year	Program	Writer(s)	Source material	Network	Ref.
1983
1983	**Blood Feud** **"Part II"**	**Robert Boris**	**Original TV movie**	**Syndicated**	
1983	V "Part I"	Kenneth Johnson	Original miniseries	NBC	
1984
1984	The First Olympics: Athens 1896	Charles Gary Allison and William Bast	Original miniseries	NBC	

Best Long Form - Adapted

Year	Program	Writer(s)	Source material	Network	Ref.
1986
1986	**Peter the Great**	**Edward Anhalt**	**The book Peter the Great: His Life and World by Robert K. Massie**	**NBC**	
1986	Trapped in Silence	Vickie Patik	The book Murphy's Boy by Torey Hayden	CBS	
1987
1987	**Escape from Sobibor**	**Reginald Rose**	**Various sources (Note: Escape from Sobibor was based on the book of the same name by Richard Rashke, the manuscript "From the Ashes of Sobibor" by Thomas Blatt and the book Inferno in Sobibor by Stanisław Szmajzner.)**	**CBS**	
1987	Prison for Children	Christopher Knopf		CBS	
1988
1988	**Onassis: The Richest Man in the World** **"Part 1"**	**Jacqueline Feather and David Seidler**	**The book Ari: The Life and Times of Aristotle Socrates Onassis by Peter Evans**	**ABC**	
1988	**Hallmark Hall of Fame: Foxfire**	**Susan Cooper**	**The play by Cooper, Hume Cronyn and Jonathan Brielle**	**CBS**	
1988	A Friendship in Vienna	Richard Alfieri	The book The Devil in Vienna by Doris Orgel	Disney Channel	
1989
1989	**Lonesome Dove** **"Part I: Leaving"**	**William D. Wittliff**	**The novel by Larry McMurtry**	**CBS**	

=== 1990s ===
Best Long Form - Adapted

Year	Program	Writer(s)	Source material	Network	Ref.
1990
1990	**Voices Within: The Lives of Truddi Chase**	**E. Jack Neuman**	**The book When Rabbit Howls by Truddi Chase**	**ABC**	
1991
1991	**Long Road Home**	**Jane-Howard Hammerstein**	**The novel by Ronald B. Taylor**	**NBC**	
1992
1992	**The Broken Cord**	**Ann Beckett**	**The book by Michael Dorris**	**ABC**	
1992	Miss Rose White	Anna Sandor	The play A Shayna Maidel by Barbara Lebow	NBC	
1993
1993	**Barbarians at the Gate**	**Larry Gelbart**	**The book by Bryan Burrough and John Helyar**	**HBO**	
1993	**Silent Cries**	**Walter Halsey Davis, and Vickie Patik**	**The book Guests of the Emperor by Janice Young Brooks**	**NBC**	
1994
1994	**A Family Torn Apart**	**Matthew Bombeck**	**The book Sudden Fury: A True Story of Adoption and Murder by Leslie Walker**	**NBC**	
1995
1995	**Citizen X**	**Chris Gerolmo**	**The book The Killer Department by Robert Cullen**	**HBO**	
1995	Joseph	Lionel Chetwynd	The novel by James Carrington	TNT	
1996
1996	**The Boys Next Door**	**William Blinn**	**The play by Tom Griffin**	**CBS**	
1996	Homecoming	Christopher Carlson and Mark Jean	The novel by Cynthia Voigt	Showtime	
1996	Kissinger and Nixon	Lionel Chetwynd	The book Kissinger: A Biography by Walter Isaacson	TNT	
1997
1997	**Bastard Out of Carolina**	**Anne Meredith**	**The novel by Dorothy Allison**	**Showtime**	
1997	George Wallace	Paul Monash and Marshall Frady	The book Wallace: The Classic Portrait of Alabama Governor George Wallace by Frady	TNT	
1997	The Hunchback	John Fasano	The novel The Hunchback of Notre-Dame by Victor Hugo	TNT	
1997	In the Gloaming	Will Scheffer	A New Yorker short story by Alice Elliott Dark	HBO	
1998
1998	**The Love Letter**	**James Henerson**	**The short story by Jack Finney**	**CBS**	
1998	Don King: Only in America	Kario Salem	The book Only in America: The Life and Crimes of Don King by Jack Newfield	HBO	
1998	Thicker Than Blood	Bill Cain	The play Stand-Up Tragedy by Cain	TNT	
1999
1999	**The Confession**	**David Black**	**The novel Fertig by Sol Yurick**	**Cinemax**	
1999	A Cooler Climate	Marsha Norman	The book by Zena Collier	Showtime	
1999	Having Our Say: The Delany Sisters' First 100 Years	Emily Mann	The book by Sarah Louise Delany, Annie Elizabeth Delany and Amy Hill Hearth	CBS	
1999	The Devil's Arithmetic	Robert J. Avrech	The novel by Jane Yolen	Showtime	

=== 2000s ===
Year	Program	Writer(s)	Source material	Network	Ref.
2000
2000	**RKO 281**	**John Logan**	**The film The Battle Over Citizen Kane by Richard Ben Cramer and Thomas Lennon from American Experience**	**HBO**	
2000	**Tuesdays with Morrie**	**Thomas Rickman**	**The book by Mitch Albom**	**ABC**	
2000	Deliberate Intent	Andy Wolk and Lisa Mohan	The book by Rod Smolla	FX	
2000	A House Divided	Paris Qualles	The book Woman of Color, Daughter of Privilege: Amanda Dickson by Kent Anderson Leslie	Showtime	
2001
2001	**Anne Frank: The Whole Story**	**Kirk Ellis**	**The book Anne Frank: The Biography by Melissa Müller**	**ABC**	
2001	Baby	David Manson, Kerry Kennedy and Patricia MacLachlan	The novel by MacLachlan	TNT	
2001	The Mists of Avalon	Gavin Scott	The novel by Marion Zimmer Bradley	TNT	
2001	Life with Judy Garland: Me and My Shadows	Robert L. Freedman	The memoir by Lorna Luft	ABC	
2001	The Song of the Lark	Joseph Maurer	The novel by Willa Cather	PBS	
2002
2002	**Band of Brothers** **"Bastogne"**	**Bruce C. McKenna**	**The book by Stephen E. Ambrose**	**HBO**	
2002	Last Call	Henry Bromell	The memoir Against the Current: As I Remember F. Scott Fitzgerald by Frances Kroll Ring	Showtime	
2002	Hysterical Blindness	Laura Cahill	The book by Cahill	HBO	
2002	Roughing It	Steven H. Berman	The book by Mark Twain	Hallmark	
2003
2003	**Out of the Ashes**	**Anne Meredith**	**The book I Was a Doctor in Auschwitz by Gisella Perl**	**Showtime**	
2003	Normal	Jane Anderson	The play Looking for Normal by Anderson	HBO	
2003	Rudy: The Rudy Giuliani Story	Stanley Weiser	The book Rudy!: An Investigative Biography of Rudy Giuliani by Wayne Barrett	USA Network	
2003	The Stranger Beside Me	Matthew McDuffie and Matthew Tabak	The book by Ann Rule	USA Network	
2004
2004	**Angels in America**	**Tony Kushner**	**The play by Kushner**	**HBO**	
2004	Cavedweller	Anne Meredith	The novel by Dorothy Allison	Showtime	
2004	The Wool Cap	William H. Macy and Steven Schachter	The film Gigot by Gene Kelly	TNT	
2005
2005	**The Life and Death of Peter Sellers**	**Christopher Markus and Stephen McFeely**	**The book by Roger Lewis**	**HBO**	
2005	The Colt	Stephen Harrigan	The short story by Mikhail Sholokhov	Hallmark	
2005	Lackawanna Blues	Ruben Santiago-Hudson	The play by Santiago-Hudson	HBO	
2005	Our Fathers	Thomas Michael Donnelly	The book by David France	Showtime	
2006
2006	Not awarded				
2007
2007	**The Company**	**Ken Nolan**	**The novel by Robert Littell**	**TNT**	
2007	Bury My Heart at Wounded Knee	Daniel Giat	The book by Dee Brown	HBO	
2007	The Starter Wife	Josann McGibbon and Sara Parriott	The novel by Gigi Levangie	USA Network	
2008
2008	**John Adams** **"Join or Die", "Independence"**	**Kirk Ellis**	**The book by David McCullough**	**HBO**	
2008	Generation Kill "Stay Frosty", "Bomb in the Garden"	Ed Burns and David Simon	The book by Evan Wright	HBO	
2008	The Memory Keeper's Daughter	John Pielmeier	The novel by Kim Edwards	Lifetime	
2009
2009	**Taking Chance**	**Michael Strobl and Ross Katz**	**The journal by Strobl**	**HBO**	
2009	America	Joyce Eliason and Rosie O'Donnell	The novel by E. R. Frank	Lifetime	

=== 2010s ===
Year	Program	Writer(s)	Source material	Network	Ref.
2010
2010	**The Pacific** **"Part Eight: Iwo Jima"**	**Robert Schenkkan and Michelle Ashford**	**Various sources (Note: The Pacific is based on the memoirs Helmet for My Pillow by Robert Leckie and With the Old Breed by Eugene Sledge, with additional material from Red Blood, Black Sand by Chuck Tatum and China Marine by Eugene Sledge.)**	**HBO**	
2010	The Pillars of the Earth	John Pielmeier	The novel by Ken Follet	Starz	
2010	Temple Grandin	Christopher Monger and William Merritt Johnson	The memoirs Emergence by Temple Grandin and Margaret Scariano, and Thinking in Pictures by Grandin	HBO	
2010	The Pacific "Part Four: Gloucester/Pavuvu/Banika"	Robert Schenkkan and Graham Yost	Various sources	HBO	
2011
2011	**Too Big to Fail**	**Peter Gould**	**The book by Andrew Ross Sorkin**	**HBO**	
2011	Mildred Pierce	Todd Haynes and Jon Raymond	The novel by James M. Cain	HBO	
2012
2012	**Game Change**	**Danny Strong**	**The book by Mark Halperin and John Heilemann**	**HBO**	
2012	Coma "Part 1", "Part 2"	John J. McLaughlin	The novel by Robin Cook	A&E	
2013
2013	**Muhammad Ali's Greatest Fight**	**Shawn Slovo**	**The book by Howard Bingham and Max Wallace**	**HBO**	
2013	Killing Kennedy	Kelly Masterson	The book by Bill O'Reilly and Martin Dugard	Nat Geo	
2014
2014	**Olive Kitteridge**	**Jane Anderson**	**The novel by Elizabeth Strout**	**HBO**	
2014	Houdini	Nicholas Meyer	The book Houdini: A Mind in Chains: A Psychoanalytic Portrait by Bernard C. Meyer	History	
2014	Klondike	Paul Scheuring, Josh Goldin, Rachel Abramowitz	The book Gold Diggers: Striking It Rich in the Klondike by Charlotte Gray	Discovery	
2014	The Normal Heart	Larry Kramer	The play by Kramer	HBO	
2014	The Leftovers "Pilot"	Damon Lindelof and Tom Perrotta	The novel by Perrotta	HBO	
2015
2015	**Fargo**	**Steve Blackman, Bob DeLaurentis, Noah Hawley, Ben Nedivi, and Matt Wolpert**	**The film by Joel Coen and Ethan Coen**	**FX**	
2015	The Red Tent	Elizabeth Chandler and Anne Meredith	The novel by Anita Diamant	Lifetime	
2015	Show Me a Hero	David Simon and William F. Zorzi	The book by Lisa Belkin	HBO	
2016	**The People v. O. J. Simpson: American Crime Story**	**Scott Alexander, Joe Robert Cole, D.V. DeVincentis, Maya Forbes, Larry Karaszewski and Wally Wolodarsky**	**The book The Run of His Life: The People v. O.J. Simpson by Jeffrey Toobin**	**FX**	
2016	11.22.63	Bridget Carpenter, Brigitte Hales, Joe Henderson, Brian Nelson and Quinton Peeples	The novel by Stephen King	Hulu	
2016	Madoff	Ben Robbins	The book The Madoff Chronicles: Inside the Secret World of Bernie and Ruth by Brian Ross	ABC	
2016	The Night Of	Richard Price and Steven Zaillian	The television series Criminal Justice by Peter Moffat	HBO	
2016	Roots	Lawrence Konner, Alison McDonald, Charles Murray and Mark Rosenthal	The novel Roots: The Saga of an American Family by Alex Haley	History	
2017	**Big Little Lies**	**David E. Kelley**	**The novel by Liane Moriarty**	**HBO**	
2017	Fargo	Monica Beletsky, Bob DeLaurentis, Noah Hawley, Ben Nedivi and Matt Wolpert	The film by Joel Coen and Ethan Coen	FX	
2017	The Immortal Life of Henrietta Lacks	Peter Landesman, Alexander Woo and George C. Wolfe	The book by Rebecca Skloot	HBO	
2017	The Wizard of Lies	Sam Levinson, John Burnham Schwartz and Samuel Baum	The book by Diana B. Henriques and Truth and Consequences by Laurie Sandell	HBO	
2018	**The Assassination of Gianni Versace: American Crime Story**	**Maggie Cohn and Tom Rob Smith**	**The book Vulgar Favors by Maureen Orth**	**FX**	
2018	The Looming Tower	Bash Doran, Dan Futterman, Alex Gibney, Shannon Houston, Adam Rapp, Ali Selim and Lawrence Wright	The novel by Lawrence Wright	Hulu	
2018	Maniac	Nick Cuse, Cary Joji Fukunaga, Amelia Gray, Danielle Henderson, Mauricio Katz, Patrick Somerville and Caroline Williams	The television series by Espen PA Lervaag, Håakon Bast Mossige, Kjetil Indregard and Ole Marius Araldsen	Netflix	
2018	Sharp Objects	Ariella Blejer, Scott Brown, Vince Calandra, Gillian Flynn, Dawn Kamoche, Alex Metcalf and Marti Noxon	The novel by Flynn	HBO	
2019	**Fosse/Verdon**	**Debora Cahn, Joel Fields, Ike Holter, Thomas Kail, Steven Levenson, Charlotte Stoudt, Tracey Scott Wilson**	**The book Fosse by Sam Wasson**	**FX**	
2019	El Camino: A Breaking Bad Movie	Vince Gilligan	The television series Breaking Bad by Vince Gilligan	Netflix	
2019	Unbelievable	Michael Chabon, Susannah Grant, Becky Mode, Jennifer Schuur and Ayelet Waldman	Various source (Note: Unbelievable is based on the ProPublica and The Marshall Project article "An Unbelievable Story of Rape" by T. Christian Miller and Ken Armstrong and This American Life radio episode “Anatomy of Doubt".)	Netflix	
2019	The Loudest Voice	John Harrington Bland, Laura Eason, Tom McCarthy, Alex Metcalf, Gabriel Sherman and Jennifer Stahl	The book The Loudest Voice in the Room by Gabriel Sherman	Showtime	

=== 2020s ===
Year	Program	Writer(s)	Source material	Network	Ref.
2020	**The Queen's Gambit**	**Scott Frank and Allan Scott**	**The novel by Walter Travis**	**Netflix**	
2020	Bad Education	Mike Makowsky	The New York Magazine article "The Bad Superintendent' by Robert Kolker	HBO	
2020	Clouds	Kara Holden, Casey La Scala & Patrick Kopka	The book Fly A Little Higher by Laura Sobiech	Disney+	
2020	The Good Lord Bird	Jeff Augustin, Ethan Hawke, Erika L. Johnson, Mark Richard, Kristen SaBerre, Lauren Signorino	The novel by James McBride	Showtime	
2020	Little Fires Everywhere	Harris Danow, Rosa Handelman, Shannon Houston, Attica Locke, Raamla Mohamed, Amy Talkington, Liz Tigelaar, Nancy Won	The novel by Celeste Ng	Hulu	
2021	**Maid**	**Bekah Brunstetter, Marcus Gardley, Michelle Denise Jackson, Colin McKenna, Molly Smith Metzler**	**The book Maid: Hard Work, Low Pay, and a Mother's Will to Survive by Stephanie Land**	**Netflix**	
2021	Impeachment: American Crime Story	Flora Birnbaum, Sarah Burgess, Halley Feiffer, Daniel Pearle	The book A Vast Conspiracy by Jeffrey Toobin	FX	
2021	The Underground Railroad	Jihan Crowther, Allison Davis, Jacqueline Hoyt, Barry Jenkins, Nathan C. Parker, Adrienne Rush	The novel by Colson Whitehead	Prime Video	
2021	Halston	Ian Brennan, Ted Malawer, Ryan Murphy, Tim Pinckney, Sharr White, Kristina Woo	The book Simply Halston by Steven Gaines	Netflix	
2021	WandaVision	Peter Cameron, Mackenzie Dohr, Laura Donney, Bobak Esfarjani, Chuck Hayward, Megan McDonnell, Jac Schaeffer, Cameron Squires	The Marvel Comics	Disney+	
