= Writers Guild of America Award for Television: Daytime Serials =

American television award

Writers Guild of America Award for Television: Daytime Drama
- Awarded for: Outstanding Writing for a New Series
- Country: United States
- Presented by: Writers Guild of America
- First award: 1972
- Currently held by: Days of Our Lives (2021)
- Website: www.wga.org

The Writers Guild of America Award for Best Television Writing in Daytime Serials is an award presented by the Writers Guild of America to the best written television daytime serials since the 25th annual Writers Guild of America Awards in 1973. The winners are indicated in bold.

== Winners and nominees ==
=== 1970s ===
Year	Program	Writer(s)	Network
1972 (25th)
1972 (25th)	**Love of Life**	**Loring Mandel, Nancy Ford, Louis Ringwald, Mac McClelland**	**CBS**
1972 (25th)	The Secret Storm	Gabrielle Upton, Joe Fifield	CBS
1972 (25th)	Where the Heart Is	Claire Wood Labine, Paul Avila Mayer, Charles J. Dizenzo, Patricia E. Dizenzo	CBS
1973 (26th)
1973 (26th)	**Search for Tomorrow**	**Ralph Ellis & Eugenie Hunt, Bib Wein, Jane Chambers**	**CBS**
1973 (26th)	Love Is a Many Splendored Thing	Ann Marcus, Ken Hartman, Jerry Adelman	CBS
1973 (26th)	Love of Life	Claire Wood Labine, Paul Avila Mayer	CBS
1974 (27th)
1974 (27th)	**Search for Tomorrow**	**Ann Marcus, Joyce Perry, Pamela Wylie, Ray Goldstone**	**CBS**
1974 (27th)	Days of Our Lives	William J. Bell, Patricia F. Smith, William Rega, Margaret Stewart	NBC
1974 (27th)	Love of Life	Claire Wood Labine, Paul Avila Mayer, Nancy Ford, Clarice Blackburn	CBS
1975 (28th)
1975 (28th)	**Ryan's Hope**	**Claire Wood Labine, Paul Avila Mayer, Mary Ryan Munisteri, Allan Leicht**	**ABC**
1975 (28th)	Days of Our Lives	Patricia F. Smith, William J. Bell, William Rega, Margaret Stewart, Kay Lenard, Sheri Anderson	NBC
1975 (28th)	The Edge of Night	Henry Slesar	CBS
1976 (29th)
1976 (29th)	**Ryan's Hope**	**Claire Wood Labine, Paul Avila Mayer, Mary Ryan Munisteri, Jeffrey Lane**	**ABC**
1976 (29th)	Days of Our Lives	William J. Bell, Patricia Falken Smith, Bill Rega, Margaret Stewart and Kay Lenard	NBC
1976 (29th)	The Edge of Night	Henry Slesar	
1977 (30th)
1977 (30th)	**Ryan's Hope**	**Claire Wood Labine, Paul Avila Mayer, Mary Ryan Munisteri**	**ABC**
1977 (30th)	Days of Our Lives	Patricia F. Smith, William J. Bell, William Rega, Margaret Stewart, Kay Lenard	NBC
1977 (30th)	Love of Life	Gabrielle Upton	CBS
1978 (31st)
1978 (31st)	**Ryan's Hope**	**Claire Wood Labine, Jeffrey Lane, Paul Avila Mayer, Mary Ryan Munisteri, Judith Pinsker**	**ABC**
1978 (31st)	Love of Life	Gabrielle Upton	CBS
1978 (31st)	One Life to Live	Lanie Bertram, Margaret DePriest, Marisa Gioffre, Sam Hall, Peggy O'Shea, Gordon Russell, Don Wallace	ABC
1979 (32nd)
1979 (32nd)	**Guiding Light**	**Jerome Dobson, Bridget Dobson, Charles J. Dizenzo, Patricia E. Dizenzo, Robert White, Phyllis White, Robert Soderberg, Jean Rouverol**	**CBS**
1979 (32nd)	Days of Our Lives	Ann Marcus, Joyce Perry, Ray Goldstone, Laura Olsher, Rocci Chatfield, Michael Robert David	NBC
1979 (32nd)	Ryan's Hope	Claire Wood Labine, Paul Avila Mayer, Mary Ryan Munisteri, Judith Pinsker, Jeffrey Lane	ABC

=== 1980s ===
Year	Program	Writer(s)	Network
1980 (33rd)
1980 (33rd)	**Ryan's Hope**	**Claire Wood Labine, Paul Avila Mayer, Mary Ryan Munisteri, Jeffrey Lane**	**ABC**
1980 (33rd)	The Doctors	Eugenie Hunt, A. M. Barlow, Heather Matthews, Kate Brooks, Ralph Ellis, Eugenie Hunt	NBC
1980 (33rd)	Texas	John William Corrington, Joyce Hooper Corrington, Ralph Adamo, Carole Berlin, Harry Boehm, Elizabeth Boehm, Patrick Mulcahey, John Saffron	NBC
1981 (34th)
1981 (34th)	**Ryan's Hope**	**Claire Wood Labine, Paul Avila Mayer, Mary Ryan Munisteri, Jeffrey Lane**	**ABC**
1981 (34th)	The Doctors	Dennis Brite, Elizabeth Levin	NBC
1981 (34th)	Texas	John W. Corrington, Joyce Corrington, Ralph Adamo, Harry Boehm, Elizabeth Boehm, Carole Berlin, Patrick Mulcahey	NBC
1982 (35th)
1982 (35th)	**Ryan's Hope**	**Claire Wood Labine, Mary Ryan Munisteri, Eugene Price, Barbara Perlman, Rory Metcalf**	**ABC**
1982 (35th)	The Edge of Night	Henry Slesar	ABC
1983 (36th)
1983 (36th)	**Ryan's Hope**	**Claire Wood Labine, Paul Avila Mayer, Mary Ryan Munisteri, Nancy Ford**	**ABC**
1983 (36th)	Capitol	Peggy O'Shea, Craig Carlson, Granville Burgess, Richard Camp, Peggy Sloane, John Sedlak, Steve Hayes, John Williams Corrington, Joyce Corrington, Shirley Hartman, Steve Hayes, Susan Goldberg, David Bennett Carren, Carly Mary Cady, Stephen Karpf, Elinor Karpf	CBS
1984 (37th)
1984 (37th)	**Search for Tomorrow**	**Gary Tomlin, Jeanne Glynn, Courtney Simon, Robin Amos, Norman Borisoff, Louisa Burns-Bisogno, Judy Lewis, Juliet Law Packer, Jule Selbo, Diane Silver, Noreen Stone, Emily Squires, Leslie Thomas, Phyllis White, Robert White, Stephen Wardwell**	**NBC**
1984 (37th)	Guiding Light	Pamela Long Hammer, Stephanie Braxton, Trent Jones, John Kuntz, Jeff Ryder, Addie Walsh, Robin Amos, Carolyn Culliton, Charles Jay Hammer, Nancy Gail Lawrence, Michelle Poteet Lisanti, Samuel D. Ratcliffe, Pete T. Rich, Emily Squires, Christopher Whitesell	CBS
1985 (38th)
1985 (38th)	**One Life to Live**	**Peggy O'Shea, Sam Hall, S. Michael Schnessel, Lanie Bertram, Ethel Brez, Mel Brez, Barbara Morgenroth, Don Wallace, Peter Swet, Eugenie Hunt**	**ABC**
1985 (38th)	Guiding Light	Jeff Ryder, Addie Walsh, John Kuntz, Christopher Whitesell, Trent Jones, Megan McTavish, Stephen Demorest, Pete T. Rich & Nancy Gail Lawrence, Emily Squires, Robin Amos, Elaine Potwardowski	CBS
1985 (38th)	The Edge of Night	Lee Sheldon, David Snell, Marty Ross, Eric Rubinton	ABC
1986 (39th)
1986 (39th)	**Ryan's Hope**	**Thomas King, Millee Taggart, William Burritt, Mardee Kravit, Eleanor Mancusi, Maura Penders, Barbara Perlman, Dorothy Ann Purser, Eric Wiklund, Claire Wood Labine**	**ABC**
1986 (39th)	One Life to Live	Peggy O'Shea, S. Michael Schnessel, Craig G. Carlson, Lanie Bertram, Ethel M. Brez, Melvin E. Brez, Lloyd Gold, George Lefferts, Peter Swet, Don Wallace	ABC
1987 (40th)
1987 (40th)	**Ryan's Hope**	**Claire Wood Labine, Eleanor Mancusi, William Burritt, Madeline B. David, Steve Lehrman, David Appell**	**ABC**
1987 (40th)	Days of Our Lives	Sheri Anderson, Leah Laiman, Anne M. Schoettle, Thom Racina, Shelly Moore, Dena Breshears, Richard J. Allen, Linda Campanelli, Maralyn Thoma, Michelle Poteet Lisanti, Peggy Schibi, Penina Spiegel, Ted Kubiak	NBC
1988 (41st)
1988 (41st)	**Ryan's Hope**	**Claire Wood Labine, Eleanor Mancusi, William Burritt, Madeline B. David, David Appell, Rocco Bufano, Matthew Labine**	**ABC**
1988 (41st)	Guiding Light	Pamela K. Long, Trent Jones, Nancy Curlee, Stephen Demorest, Nancy Williams, Nancy Franklin, Richard E. Culliton, Nancy Gail Lawrence, Pete T. Rich, Melissa Salmons	CBS
1989 (42nd)
1989 (42nd)	**Ryan's Hope**	**Claire Wood Labine, Matthew Labine, Eleanor Mancusi, William Burritt, Louise T. Shaffer, Paul Balido**	**ABC**
1989 (42nd)	As the World Turns	Douglas Marland, John Kuntz, Stephanie Braxton, Juliet Law Packer, Meredith Post, Nancy Ford, Penelope Koechl, Richard Backus, Caroline Franz, Patricia E. Dizenzo	CBS
1989 (42nd)	All My Children	Agnes Nixon, Margaret DePriest, Lorraine Broderick, Victor Miller, Peggy Sloane, Megan McTavish, Gillian Spencer, Mary K. Wells, Susan Kirshenbaum, Elizabeth Page, Karen Lewis, Elizabeth Wallace, Kathleen Klein	ABC

=== 1990s ===
Year	Program	Writer(s)	Network
1990 (43rd)
1990 (43rd)	**Santa Barbara**	**Charles Pratt Jr., Sheri Anderson, Samuel D. Ratcliffe, Maralyn Thoma, Sam Hall, Josh Griffith, Patrick Mulcahey, Robert Guza Jr., Courtney Simon, Lynda Myles, Gary Tomlin, Frank Salisbury, Libby Beers, David J. Ross**	**NBC**
1990 (43rd)	All My Children	Agnes Nixon, Lorraine Broderick, Wisner Washam, Megan McTavish, Mary K. Wells, Susan Kirshenbaum, Karen Lewis, Elizabeth Smith, Kathleen Klein LeStrange, Gillian Spencer, Michelle Patrick, Margaret DePriest, Victor Miller, Elizabeth Page	ABC
1991 (44th)
1991 (44th)	**Guiding Light**	**Nancy Curlee, Stephen Demorest, James E. Reilly, Nancy Williams, Michael Conforti, Bill Elverman, Nancy Gail Lawrence, Pete T. Rich, Melissa Salmons, Peggy Schibi, Sybil Rosen, Pamela K. Long**	**CBS**
1991 (44th)	All My Children	Lorraine Broderick, Agnes Nixon, Wisner Washam, Megan McTavish, Hal Corley, Mary K. Wells, Susan Kirshenbaum, Karen Lewis, Elizabeth Smith, Kathleen Klein LeStrange, Gillian Spencer, Michelle Patrick	ABC
1991 (44th)	Days of Our Lives	Anne M. Schoettle, Richard J. Allen, Gene Palumbo, Leah Laiman, Dena Higley, Marcia E. Greenlaw, Roberto Loiederman, Beth Milstein, Sheri Anderson, Michelle Poteet Lisanti, Mike Cohen, Maura Penders, Mary Jeannett, Penina Spiegel, Marlene Clark Poulter, Dwight D. Smith	NBC
1991 (44th)	Santa Barbara	Bridget Dobson, Jerome Dobson, Samuel D. Ratcliffe, Maralyn Thoma, Linda Hamner, Josh Griffith, Gary Tomlin, Courtney Simon, Robert O. Guza, Jr., Richard E. Culliton, Lynda Myles, Michele Val Jean, Bettina F. Bradbury, Christopher Dunn, Mary Dobson-Collier, Frank Salisbury, Patrick Mulcahey, Meg Bennett	NBC
1992 (45th)
1992 (45th)	**One Life to Live**	**Michael Malone, Josh Griffith, Jean Passanante, Dorothy Goldstone, Kate Rogin, Alan Bernstein, Eleanor Mancusi, Juliette Mann, Neal Bell, Lloyd Gold, Becky Cole, David Smilow, Fran Newman, Roger Newman, Bill Hoffman, Jeffrey Sweet, Alan Gelb**	**ABC**
1992 (45th)	Santa Barbara	Pamela K. Long, Samuel D. Ratcliffe, Michele Val Jean, Christopher Dunn, Meg Bennett, Thom Racina, Bettina F. Bradbury, Millee Taggart, Jerome Dobson, Bridget Dobson, Mary Dobson-Collier, Lynda Myles, Gary Tomlin	NBC
1993 (46th)
1993 (46th)	**Loving**	**Millee Taggart, Robert Guza Jr., Laurie McCarthy, Addie Walsh, Craig Carlson, John Kuntz, Eugenie Hunt, Dana Herko, Lewis Arlt, Tony Lang, Lynda Myles, Juliette Mann, Andrew Gottlieb, Nancy Maxwell**	**ABC**
1993 (46th)	Another World	Peggy Sloane, Victor Miller, Craig Carlson, Samuel D. Ratcliffe, Lisa Kern, Janet Stampfl, Kathleen Kennedy, Judith Pinsker, Kathleen Klein, Janet Iacobuzio, Sharon Epstein, Matthew Lombardo, Mimi Leahey, Elizabeth Page, Peter Brash	NBC
1993 (46th)	Days of Our Lives	James E. Reilly, Maura Penders, Sheri Anderson, Dena Higley, Melvin E. Brez, Ethel M. Brez, Marlene Clark Poulter, Dorothy Ann Purser, Frances Myers, Maralyn Thoma, Michelle Poteet Lisanti, Mary Jeannett LeDonne, Elizabeth Harrower, Pete T. Rich, Nancy Gail Lawrence, Peggy Schibi	NBC
1993 (46th)	General Hospital	Michele Val Jean, William G. Levinson, Tom Citrano, Ralph Ellis, Linda Hamner, Cynthia M. Jervey & Elizabeth F. Snyder, Carol Saraceno, Meg Bennett, Linda Campanelli, Kimmer Ringwald, Gillian Spencer, Karen Harris, Doris Silverton	ABC
1993 (46th)	All My Children	Megan McTavish, Agnes Nixon, Richard E. Culliton, Hal Corley, Carolyn Culliton, Karen Lewis, Janet Iacobuzio, Elizabeth Smith, Michelle Patrick, Jeffrey Beldner, Bettina F. Bradbury, Ralph Wakefield, Judith Donato, Susan Kirshenbaum, Kathleen Klein LeStrange	ABC
1994 (47th)
1994 (47th)	**General Hospital**	**Claire Wood Labine, Matthew Labine, Eleanor Mancusi, Ralph Ellis, Meg Bennett, Michele Val Jean, Stephanie Braxton, Lewis Arlt, Karen Harris**	**ABC**
1994 (47th)	Another World	Peggy Sloane, Victor Miller, Lorraine Broderick, Craig G. Carlson, Samuel D. Ratcliffe, Carolyn Culliton, Judith Pinsker, Janet Iacobuzio, Kathleen Klein LeStrange, Mimi Leahey, Peter Brash, Kathleen Kennedy, Elizabeth Page, Sofia Landon Geier, Sharon Epstein	NBC
1994 (47th)	Guiding Light	Nancy Curlee, Stephen Demorest, Patrick Mulcahey, Millee Taggart, Nancy Williams Watt, Leah Laiman, Jane Atkins, James Harmon Brown, Michael Conforti, Barbara Esensten, Jeanne Glynn, Lynda Myles, Roger Newman, Courtney Simon	CBS
1994 (47th)	One Life to Live	Michael Malone, Josh Griffith, Jean Passanante, Susan Bedsow-Horgan, Chris Whitesell, David Colson, Matt Gannon, David Smilow, Becky Cole, Lloyd Gold, Mike Cohen	ABC
1995 (48th)
1995 (48th)	**General Hospital**	**Claire Wood Labine, Matthew Labine, Eleanor Mancusi, Meg Bennett, Ralph Ellis, Michele Val Jean, Stephanie Braxton, Karen Harris, Lewis Arlt, Judith Pinsker**	**ABC**
1995 (48th)	Another World	Carolyn Culliton, Janet Iacobuzio, Samuel D. Ratcliffe, Lorraine Broderick, Victor Miller, Mimi Leahey, Peter Brash, Sharon Epstein, Sofia Landon Geier, Kathy Ebel, Elizabeth Page, Kathleen Kennedy	NBC
1995 (48th)	All My Children	Agnes Nixon, Hal Corley, Frederick Johnson, Nancy Gail Lawrence, Jeffrey Beldner, Karen Lewis, Elizabeth Smith, Michelle Patrick, Bettina F. Bradbury, Ralph Wakefield, Pete T. Rich, Judith Donato, Megan McTavish	ABC
1995 (48th)	Guiding Light	Douglas Anderson, James Harmon Brown, Craig G. Carlson, Michael Conforti, Stephen Demorest, Barbara Esensten, Jeanne Glynn, Judith Jenkins, Thomas King, Kathleen Klein LeStrange, Megan McTavish, Lynda Myles, Roger Newman, Courtney Simon, Peggy Sloane, Betsy Tooker Transom, Nancy Williams Watt	CBS
1996 (49th)
1996 (49th)	**All My Children**	**Agnes Nixon, Lorraine Broderick, Hal Corley, Frederick Johnson, Nancy Gail Lawrence, Jeffrey Beldner, Christina Covino, Courtney Simon, Millee Taggart, Karen Lewis, Elizabeth Smith, Michelle Patrick, Bettina F. Bradbury, Judith Donato, Kathleen Klein LeStrange, Jane Owen Murphy**	**ABC**
1996 (49th)	General Hospital	Claire Wood Labine, Matthew Labine, Robert O. Guza, Jr., Karen Harris, Michele Val Jean, Meg Bennett, Ralph Ellis, Mary Ryan, Jane Atkins, Stephanie Braxton, Judith Pinsker, Lynda Myles, Elizabeth Korte, Patrick Mulcahey, Lisa Lieberman	ABC
1997 (50th)
1997 (50th)	**General Hospital**	**Meg Bennett, Richard E. Culliton, Karen Harris, Craig Heller, Janet Iacobuzio, Elizabeth Korte, William G. Levinson, Eleanor Mancusi, Patrick Mulcahey, Lynda Myles, Judith Pinsker, Mary Ryan, Courtney Simon, Michele Val Jean, Christopher Whitesell, Garin Wolf**	**ABC**
1997 (50th)	Another World	Michael Malone, Thomas King, Craig G. Carlson, Elizabeth Page, Margaret DePriest, Shelly Altman, Peter Brash, Christopher Whitesell, Sofia Landon Geier, Mary Sue Price, Gillian Spencer, Lewis Arlt, Richard J. Allen, Joanna Kosloff, Michael Slade, Susan McMartin, Thomas Babe, Mimi Leahey, Juliet Law Packer	NBC
1997 (50th)	Sunset Beach	Robert Guza, Jr., Charles Pratt Jr., Josh Griffith, Meg Bennett, Shelly Moore, Michelle Poteet Lisanti, Christopher Dunn, Dana Herko, Lisa Seidman, Elizabeth Snyder, Mick Curran, Deborah Zoe Dawson, J. Robert Langston, Beth Milstein, Anne M. Schoettle, Linda Schreyer, Sandy Siegel, Bruce Singer, Robert Zimmer Jr.	NBC
1997 (50th)	All My Children	Agnes Nixon, Lorraine Broderick, Millee Taggart, Hal Corley, Frederick Johnson, Peggy Sloane, Jeffrey Beldner, Christina Covino, Courtney Simon, Karen Lewis, Elizabeth Smith, Michelle Patrick, Bettina F. Bradbury, Judith Donato, Kathleen Klein LeStrange, Jane Owen Murphy, Caroline Franz, Charlotte Gibson	ABC
1997 (50th)	As the World Turns	Addie Walsh, Melvin E. Brez, Stephen Demorest, Lisa K. Connor, Patricia E. Dizenzo, Ralph Ellis, Susan Kirshenbaum, John Kuntz, Mary Sue Price, Louise T. Shaffer, Melissa Salmons, Leah Laiman, Penelope Koechl	CBS
1997 (50th)	Guiding Light	Barbara Esensten, James Harmon Brown, Michael Conforti, Victor Miller, Megan McTavish, Nancy Williams Watt, Kathleen Kennedy, Nancy Gail Lawrence, Jeanne Glynn, Tita Bell, Sharon Epstein, Roger Newman, Pete T. Rich, Loren Segan, Ralph Wakefield	CBS
1998 (51st)
1998 (51st)	**All My Children**	**Agnes Nixon, Megan McTavish, Lorraine Broderick, Hal Corley, Frederick Johnson, Peggy Sloane, Victor Miller, Craig G. Carlson, Nancy Gail Lawrence, Juliet Law Packer, Karen Lewis, Michelle Patrick, Bettina F. Bradbury, Judith Donato, Kathleen Klein LeStrange, Caroline Franz, Charlotte Gibson, Elizabeth Page, Sharon Epstein**	**ABC**
1998 (51st)	As the World Turns	Hal Corley, Addie Walsh, Lisa K. Connor, Jeffrey Beldner, Christina Covino, Leah Laiman, David Cherrill, Patricia E. Dizenzo, Penelope Koechl, Melissa Salmons, Louise T. Shaffer, Peter Webb, Jessica Klein, Melvin E. Brez, Lorraine Broderick	CBS
1998 (51st)	Guiding Light	James Harmon Brown, Barbara Esensten, Tita Bell, Michael Conforti, Sharon Epstein, Jeanne Glynn, Jill Lorie Hurst, Frederick Johnson, Kathleen Kennedy, David Kreizman, Tony Lang, Nancy Gail Lawrence, Roger Newman, Pete T. Rich, Loren Segan, Donna Swajeski, Nancy Williams Watt	CBS
1998 (51st)	General Hospital	Stephen Demorest, Robert O. Guza, Jr., Craig Heller, Janet Iacobuzio, Elizabeth Korte, William G. Levinson, Shelly Moore, Patrick Mulcahey, Lynda Myles, Michael Quinn, Mary Ryan, Courtney Simon, Michele Val Jean, Christopher Whitesell, Garin Wolf	ABC
1999 (52nd)
1999 (52nd)	**Days of Our Lives**	**Sally Sussman Morina, Dena Higley, Marlene Clark Poulter, Dorothy Ann Purser, Victor Gialanella, Meredith Post, Peter Brash, Peggy Schibi, Frances Myers, Maralyn Thoma, Joyce Rosenblad, Bruce Neckels and Sofia Landon Geier**	**NBC**
1999 (52nd)	All My Children	Agnes Nixon, Elizabeth Page, Megan McTavish, Victor Miller, Craig G. Carlson, Nancy Gail Lawrence, Frederick Johnson, Juliet Law Packer, Mimi Leahey, Karen Lewis, Bettina F. Bradbury, Kathleen Klein LeStrange, Caroline Franz, Charlotte Gibson, Sharon Epstein, John Piroman	ABC
1999 (52nd)	The Young and the Restless	Kay Alden, William J. Bell, Trent Jones, Jerry Birn, John F. Smith, Natalie Minardi, Jim Houghton, Eric Freiwald, Janice Ferri, Rex M. Best, Michael Minnis, Randy Holland	CBS

=== 2000s ===
Year	Program	Writer(s)	Network
2000 (53rd)
2000 (53rd)	**All My Children**	**Agnes Nixon, Jean Passanante, Craig G. Carlson, Frederick Johnson, Nancy Gail Lawrence, Victor Miller, Juliet Law Packer, Addie Walsh, Mimi Leahey, Bettina F. Bradbury, Caroline Franz, Charlotte Gibson, David Hiltbrand, Janet Iacobuzio, Royal Miller, John Piroman, Rebecca Taylor**	**ABC**
2000 (53rd)	Passions	James E. Reilly, Ethel M. Brez, Melvin E. Brez, Shawn Morrison, Marlene Clark Poulter, Darrell Ray Thomas, Jr., Peggy Schibi, Roger Newman, Pete T. Rich, Maralyn Thoma, Nancy Williams Watt	NBC
2001 (54th)
2001 (54th)	**All My Children**	**Agnes Nixon, Jean Passanante, Craig G. Carlson, Frederick Johnson, Nancy Gail Lawrence, Victor Miller, Juliet Law Packer, Addie Walsh, Mimi Leahey, Bettina F. Bradbury, Charlotte Gibson, David Hiltbrand, Janet Iacobuzio, Royal Miller, John Piroman, Rebecca Taylor, Neal Bell**	**ABC**
2001 (54th)	Guiding Light	Claire Wood Labine, Matthew Labine, Eleanor Labine, Tita Bell, Stephanie Braxton, Christopher Dunn, Jill Lorie Hurst, David Kreizman, Penelope Koechl, Danielle Paige, Melissa Salmons, David Smilow	CBS
2001 (54th)	The Young and the Restless	Kay Alden, Trent Jones, Jerry Birn, John F. Smith, Natalie Minardi Slater (as Natalie Minardi), Jim Houghton, Eric Freiwald, Rex M. Best, Janice Ferri, Michael Minnis, Joshua McCaffrey	CBS
2001 (54th)	Days of Our Lives	Tom Langan, Dena Higley, Dorothy Ann Purser, Victor Gialanella, Peter Brash, Paula Cwikly, Frances Myers, Sofia Landon Geier, Jeanne Marie Grunwell, Randy Holland, Edwin Klein, Richard E. Culliton, Christopher Whitesell, Joyce Rosenblad, Cydney Kelley	NBC
2002 (55th)
2002 (55th)	**The Young and the Restless**	**Kay Alden, Trent Jones, John F. Smith, Jerry Birn, Jim Houghton, Natalie Minardi Slater (as Natalie Minardi), Janice Ferri, Eric Freiwald, Joshua McCaffrey, Michael Minnis, Rex M. Best**	**CBS**
2002 (55th)	Guiding Light	Millee Taggart, Lloyd "Lucky" Gold, Christopher Dunn, Tita Bell, Jill Lorie Hurst, Penelope Koechl, David Kreizman, Eleanor Labine, Alan Madison, Danielle Paige, A. J. Pierce, Janet Reed Ahearn, Susan Rice, David Rupel, Melissa Salmons, Eddie Sanchez, Lisa Seidman, David Smilow	CBS
2003 (56th)
2003 (56th)	**All My Children**	**Agnes Nixon, Megan McTavish, Gordon Rayfield, Anna Theresa Cascio, Frederick Johnson, Jeffrey Beldner, Janet Iacobuzio, Lisa K. Connor, Addie Walsh, Victor Miller, Mimi Leahey, Bettina F. Bradbury, John Piroman, Karen Lewis, Amanda Robb, Rebecca Taylor, Christina Covino, David A. Levinson**	**ABC**
2003 (56th)	One Life to Live	Josh Griffith, Michael Malone, Shelly Altman, Lorraine Broderick, Richard Backus, Ron Carlivati, Anna Theresa Cascio, David Colson, Leslie Nipkow, Michelle Poteet Lisanti, Becky Cole, James Fryman, Katherine Schock, Ginger Redmon, Daniel Griffin	ABC
2004 (57th)
2004 (57th)	**Guiding Light**	**David Kreizman, Tita Bell, Joyce Brotman, Christopher Dunn, Lloyd Gold, Kimberly Hamilton, Jill Lorie Hurst, Penelope Koechl, Eleanor Labine, Royal Miller, Casandra Morgan, Danielle Paige, David Smilow, Gillian Spencer, Brett Staneart, Donna Swajeski, Ellen Weston**	**CBS**
2005 (58th)
2005 (58th)	**The Young and the Restless**	**Kay Alden; Head writer: John F. Smith; Written by: Janice Ferri, Jim Houghton, Natalie Minardi Slater, Sally Sussman Morina, Sara Bibel, Eric Freiwald, Linda Schreiber, Joshua S. McCaffrey, Marc Hertz, Sandra Weintraub**	**CBS**
2005 (58th)	As the World Turns	Jean Passanante; Co-Head writers: Christopher Whitesell, Leah Laiman; Written by: Hogan Sheffer, Lisa K. Connor, Paula Cwikly, Charlotte Gibson, Frederick Johnson, Trent Jones, Courtney Simon, Susan Dansby, Elizabeth Page, Melissa Salmons, Judy Tate, Judy Donato, Meg Kelly, Lynn Martin, Josh Griffith	CBS
2005 (58th)	One Life to Live	Dena Higley; Written by: Leslie Nipkow, Shelly Altman, Ron Carlivati, Anna Cascio, Tom Casiello, Janet Iacobuzio, Mark Christopher, Carolyn Culliton, Daniel Griffin, Michelle Poteet Lisanti, Fran Myers, Ginger Redmon, Chris VanEtten, John Loprieno, James Harmon Brown, Barbara Esensten	ABC
2006 (59th)
2006 (59th)	**As the World Turns**	**Jean Passanante, Leah Laiman, Christopher Whitesell, Courtney Simon, Anna Cascio, Lisa Connor, Paula Cwikly, Hogan Sheffer, Judy Tate, Bettina Bradley, Richard Culliton, Susan Dansby, Judy Donato, Josh Griffith, Elizabeth Page, Melissa Salmons, Charlotte Gibson**	**CBS**
2006 (59th)	All My Children	Megan McTavish, Addie Walsh, Victor Miller, Chip Hayes, Stephen Demorest, Michelle Patrick, Jeff Beldner, Bettina F. Bradbury, Karen Lewis, Rebecca Taylor, Amanda L. Beall, Marla Kanelos, Courtney Bugler	ABC
2006 (59th)	The Young and the Restless	Lynn Marie Latham, Kay Alden, John F. Smith, Scott Hamner, Josh Griffith, Sally Sussman Morina, Sara Bibel, Paula Cwikly, Jim Houghton, Trent Jones, Natalie Minardi Slater, Lynsey Dufour, Janice Ferri Esser, Eric Freiwald, Marc Hertz, Bernard Lechowick, Joshua McCaffrey, Linda Schreiber, Sandra Weintraub, Sherman Magidson	CBS
2006 (59th)	Guiding Light	David Kreizman, Donna Swajeski, Jill Lorie Hurst, Christopher Dunn (as Chris Dunn), Lloyd Gold, Dave Rupel, Charlotte Gibson, Rebecca Hanover, Tita Bell, David Smilow, Penelope Koechl, Royal Miller, Brett Staneart, Kimberly Hamilton, Mike Cohen	CBS
2007 (60th)
2007 (60th)	**The Young and the Restless**	**Lynn Marie Latham, Scott Hamner, Jeff Gottesfeld & Cherie Bennett, Bernard Lechowick, James Stanley, Natalie Minardi Slater, Lynsey Dufour, Marina Alburger, Sara Bibel, Paula Cwikly, Janice Ferri Esser, Eric Freiwald & Linda Schreiber, Joshua McCaffrey, Sandra Weintraub**	**CBS**
2007 (60th)	All My Children	James Harmon Brown, Megan McTavish, Addie Walsh, Chip Hayes, Stephen Demorest, Michelle Patrick, Amanda L. Beall, Jeff Beldner, Karen Lewis, Rebecca Taylor, Marla Kanelos, Courtney Bugler, Joanna Cohen, Kate Hall	ABC
2007 (60th)	As the World Turns	Jean Passanante, Leah Laiman, Christopher Whitesell, Courtney Simon, Anna Theresa Cascio, Lisa Connor, David A. Levinson, Gary Sunshine, Bettina Bradbury, Richard Culliton, Susan Dansby, Judy Donato, Mimi Leahey, Elizabeth Page, Judy Tate	CBS
2007 (60th)	General Hospital	Robert Guza, Jr., Elizabeth Korte, Michael Conforti, David Goldschmid, Michele Val Jean, Mary Sue Price, Karen Harris, Susan Wald, Tracey Thompson	ABC
2008 (61st)
2008 (61st)	**As the World Turns**	**Jean Passanante, Leah Laiman, Courtney Simon, Lisa Connor, David A. Levinson, Peter Brash, Richard Culliton, Susan Dansby, Cheryl Davis, Leslie Nipkow**	**CBS**
2008 (61st)	One Life to Live	Ron Carlivati, Carolyn Culliton, Elizabeth Page, Aida Croal, Shelly Altman, Janet Iacobuzio, Christopher Van Etten, Anna Theresa Cascio	ABC
2009 (62nd)
2009 (62nd)	**The Young and the Restless**	**Amanda L. Beall, Tom Casiello, Lisa Connor, Janice Ferri Esser, Eric Freiwald, Jay Gibson, Scott Hamner, Marla Kanelos, Beth Milstein, Natalie Minardi Slater, Melissa Salmons, Linda Schreiber, James Stanley, Sandra Weintraub, Teresa Zimmerman**	**CBS**
2009 (62nd)	All My Children	Jeffrey Beldner, Joanna Cohen, Kate Hall, Chip Hayes, Michelle Patrick, Charles Pratt, Jr., Rebecca Taylor, Tracey Thomson, Addie Walsh	ABC
2009 (62nd)	One Life to Live	Shelly Altman, Ron Carlivati, Anna Theresa Cascio, Aida Croal, Carolyn Culliton, Janet Iacobuzio, Frederick Johnson, Sharon Lennon, Elizabeth Page, Melissa Salmons, Katherine Schock, Scott Sickles, Chris VanEtten	ABC
2009 (62nd)	As the World Turns	Peter Brash, Lisa Connor, Susan Dansby, Cheryl Davis, Leah Laiman, David A. Levinson, Leslie Nipkow, Jean Passanante, Gordon Rayfield, Courtney Simon	CBS

=== 2010s ===
Year	Program	Writer(s)	Network
2010 (63rd)
2010 (63rd)	**As the World Turns**	**Susan Dansby, Lucky Gold, Janet Iacobuzio, Penelope Koechl, David Kreizman, Leah Laiman, David A. Levinson, Leslie Nipkow, Jean Passanante, Gordon Rayfield, David Smilow**	**CBS**
2010 (63rd)	General Hospital	Meg Bennett, Nathan Fissell, David Goldschmid, Robert O. Guza, Jr., Karen Harris, Elizabeth Korte, Mary Sue Price, David F. Ryan, Tracey Thomson, Michele Val Jean, Susan Wald	ABC
2010 (63rd)	One Life to Live	Shelly Altman, Ron Carlivati, Anna Theresa Cascio, Aida Croal, Carolyn Culliton, Frederick Johnson, Elizabeth Page, Gordon Rayfield, Melissa Salmons, Katherine Schock, Scott Sickles, Courtney Simon, Chris VanEtten	ABC
2011 (64th)
2011 (64th)	**General Hospital**	**Meg Bennett, Nathan Fissell, David Goldschmid, Robert O. Guza Jr., Karen Harris, Elizabeth Korte, Mary Sue Price, Michele Val Jean, Susan Wald, Tracey Thomson**	**ABC**
2011 (64th)	The Young and the Restless	Amanda L. Beall, Tom Casiello, Susan Dansby, Janice Ferri Esser, Jay Gibson, Scott Hamner, Marla Kanelos, Natalie Minardi Slater, Beth Milstein, Michael Montgomery, Anne Schoettle, Linda Schreiber, Sarah Smith, Sandra Weintraub, Chris Whitesell, Teresa Zimmerman	CBS
2011 (64th)	All My Children	Jeff Beldner, Lorraine Broderick, Joanna Cohen, Lisa K. Connor, Chris Dunn, Lucky Gold, Kate Hall, Chip Hayes, David Kreizman, Dave Ryan, Donna Swajeski, Rebecca Taylor, Addie Walsh	ABC
2012 (65th)
2012 (65th)	**The Young and the Restless**	**Amanda L. Beall, Jeffrey Beldner, Susan Dansby, Janice Ferri Esser, Jay Gibson, Scott M. Hamner, Marla Kanelos, Natalie Minardi Slater, Beth Milstein, Michael Montgomery, Anne M. Schoettle, Linda Schreiber, Sarah K. Smith, Christopher J. Whitesell, Teresa Zimmerman**	**CBS**
2012 (65th)	Days of Our Lives	Lorraine Broderick, Carolyn Culliton, Richard E. Culliton, Rick Draughon, Christopher Dunn, Lacey Dyer, Janet Iacobuzio, David A. Levinson, Ryan Quan, Dave Ryan, Melissa Salmons, Roger Schroeder, Elizabeth F. Snyder, Christopher J. Whitesell, Nancy Williams Watt	NBC
2012 (65th)	One Life to Live	Lorraine Broderick, Ron Carlivati, Anna Theresa Cascio, Daniel James O'Connor, Elizabeth Page, Jean Passanante, Melissa Salmons, Katherine Schock, Scott Sickles, Courtney Simon, Chris Van Etten	ABC
2013 (66th)
2013 (66th)	**Days of Our Lives**	**Lorraine Broderick, David Cherrill, Carolyn Culliton, Richard Culliton, Rick Draughon, Christopher Dunn, Janet Iacobuzio, David A. Levinson, Ryan Quan, Dave Ryan, Melissa Salmons, Christopher J. Whitesell**	**NBC**
2013 (66th)	General Hospital	Shelly Altman, Ron Carlivati, Anna Theresa Cascio, Suzanne Flynn, Kate Hall, Elizabeth Korte, Daniel James O'Connor, Jean Passanante, Elizabeth Page, Katherine Schock, Scott Sickles	ABC
2013 (66th)	The Young and the Restless	Shelly Altman, Tracey Thompson, Amanda Beall, Jeff Beldner, Brent Boyd, Susan Dansby, Janice Ferri Esser, Jay Gibson, Beth Milstein, Lisa Seidman, Natalie Minardi Slater, Anne Schoettle, Linda Schreiber, Teresa Zimmerman	CBS
2014 (67th)
2014 (67th)	**General Hospital**	**Ron Carlivati, Anna Theresa Cascio, Suzanne Flynn, Kate Hall, Elizabeth Korte, Daniel James O'Connor, Elizabeth Page, Katherine Schock, Scott Sickles, Chris Van Etten**	**ABC**
2014 (67th)	Days of Our Lives	Lorraine Broderick, David Cherrill, Carolyn Culliton, Richard Culliton, Rick Draughon, Christopher Dunn, Janet Iacobuzio, Ryan Quan, Dave Ryan, Melissa Salmons, Christopher Whitesell	NBC
2015 (68th)
2015 (68th)	**General Hospital**	**Ron Carlivati, Anna Theresa Cascio, Andrea Archer Compton, Suzanne Flynn, Kate Hall, Elizabeth Korte, Daniel James O'Connor, Elizabeth Page, Jean Passanante, Katherine Schock, Scott Sickles, Chris Van Etten**	**ABC**
2015 (68th)	The Bold and the Beautiful	Bradley P. Bell, Michael Minnis Writers: Rex M. Best, Shannon Bradley, Adam Dusevoir, Tracey Ann Kelly, Patrick Mulcahey, Mark Pinciotti, Michele Val Jean	CBS
2016 (69th)
2016 (69th)	**General Hospital**	**Shelly Altman, Anna Theresa Cascio, Andrea Archer Compton, Suzanne Flynn, Janet Iacobuzio, Elizabeth Korte, Daniel James O'Connor, Jean Passanante, Dave Rupel, Katherine Schock, Scott Sickles, Chris Van Etten, Christopher Whitesell**	**ABC**
2017 (70th)
2017 (70th)	**General Hospital**	**Shelly Altman, Jean Passanante; Writers: Anna Theresa Cascio, Suzanne Flynn, Charlotte Gibson, Lucky Gold, Kate Hall, Elizabeth Korte, Daniel James O'Connor, Dave Rupel, Katherine Schock, Scott Sickles, Christopher Van Etten, Christopher Whitesell**	**ABC**
2017 (70th)	Days of Our Lives	Ron Carlivati, Sheri Anderson, Lorraine Broderick, David Cherrill, Lisa Connor, Carolyn Culliton, Richard Culliton, Rick Draughon, Cydney Kelley, David Kreizman, David A. Levinson, Rebecca McCarty, Ryan Quan, Dave Ryan, Elizabeth Snyder, Tyler Topits	NBC
2018 (71st)
2018 (71st)	**General Hospital**	**Shelly Altman, Christopher Van Etten, Barbara Bloom, Anna Theresa Cascio, Suzanne Flynn, Charlotte Gibson, Lucky Gold, Kate Hall, Elizabeth Korte, Daniel James O'Connor, Donny Sheldon, Scott Sickles**	**ABC**
2018 (71st)	Days of Our Lives	Ron Carlivati, Sheri Anderson, Lorraine Broderick, David Cherrill, Joanna Cohen, Lisa Connor, Carolyn Culliton, Richard Culliton, Rick Draughon, Cydney Kelley, David Kreizman, David A. Levinson, Rebecca McCarty, Ryan Quan, Dave Ryan, Katherine Schock, Elizabeth Snyder, Tyler Topits	NBC
2019 (72nd)
2019 (72nd)	**The Young and the Restless**	**Amanda L. Beall, Jeff Beldner, Sara Bibel, Matt Clifford, Annie Compton, Christopher Dunn, Sara Endsley, Janice Ferri Esser, Mellinda Hensley, Anne Schoettle, Natalie Minardi Slater, Teresa Zimmerman**	**CBS**
2019 (72nd)	Days of Our Lives	Lorraine Broderick, Ron Carlivati, Joanna Cohen, Carolyn Culliton, Richard Culliton, Rick Draughon, David Kreizman, Rebecca McCarty, Ryan Quan, Dave Ryan, Betsy Snyder, Katie Schock	NBC
2019 (72nd)	General Hospital	Shelly Altman, Christopher Van Etten, Anna T. Cascio, Dan O'Connor, Barbara Bloom, Suzanne Flynn, Charlotte Gibson, Lucky Gold, Kate Hall, Elizabeth Korte, Donny Sheldon, Scott Sickles	ABC

=== 2020s ===
Year	Program	Writer(s)	Network
2020 (73rd)
2020 (73rd)	**Days of Our Lives**	**Ron Carlivati, Lorraine Broderick, Joanna Cohen, Carolyn Culliton, Richard Culliton, Rick Draughon, David Kreizman, Rebecca McCarty, Ryan Quan, Dave Ryan, Katherine D. Schock, Elizabeth Snyder**	**NBC**
2020 (73rd)	General Hospital	Dan O'Connor, Christopher Van Etten, Anna Theresa Cascio; Writers: Barbara Bloom, Suzanne Flynn, Charlotte Gibson, Lucky Gold, Kate Hall, Elizabeth Korte, David Rupel, Lisa Seidman, Donny Sheldon, Scott Sickles	ABC
2021 (74th)
2021 (74th)	**Days of Our Lives**	**Ron Carlivati, Lorraine Broderick, Joanna Cohen, Carolyn Culliton, Richard Culliton, Jamey Giddens, David Kreizman, Rebecca McCarty, Ryan Quan, Dave Ryan, Katherine D. Schock, Elizabeth Snyder**	**NBC**
2021 (74th)	General Hospital	Chris Van Etten, Dan O'Connor, Anna T. Cascio; Writers: Barbara Bloom, Suzanne Flynn, Charlotte Gibson, Lucky Gold, Kate Hall, Elizabeth Korte, Shannon Peace, David Rupel, Lisa Seidman, Scott Sickles	ABC
2021 (74th)	The Young and the Restless	Amanda L. Beall, Susan Banks, Jeff Beldner, Sara A. Bibel, Brent Boyd, Susan Dansby, Christopher Dunn, Sara Endsley, Janice Ferri Esser, Marin Gazzaniga, Lynn Martin, Natalie Minardi Slater, Teresa Zimmerman	CBS

== Programs with multiple awards ==
12 awards

- Ryan's Hope (ABC)

9 awards

- General Hospital (ABC)

6 awards

- The Young and the Restless (CBS)

5 awards

- All My Children (ABC)

4 awards

- Days of Our Lives (NBC)

3 awards

- Search for Tomorrow (NBC)
- Guiding Light (CBS)
- As the World Turns (CBS)

2 awards

- One Life to Live (ABC)

== Programs with multiple nominations ==
18 nominations

- Days of Our Lives (NBC)
- General Hospital (ABC)

16 nominations

- All My Children (ABC)

13 nominations

- Ryan's Hope (ABC)
- Guiding Light (CBS)

12 nominations

- The Young and the Restless (CBS)

11 nominations

- One Life to Live (ABC)

9 nominations

- As the World Turns (CBS)

4 nominations

- Love of Life (CBS)
- The Edge of Night (CBS)
- Another World (NBC)

3 nominations

- Search for Tomorrow (NBC)
- Santa Barbara (NBC)

2 nominations

- The Doctors (NBC)
- Texas (NBC)
