= 37th Writers Guild of America Awards =

37th WGA Awards
- Date: 1985
- Organized by: Writers Guild of America, East and the Writers Guild of America, West

The 37th Writers Guild of America Awards honored the best television, and film writers of 1984. Winners were announced in 1985.

== Winners and nominees ==
=== Film ===
Winners are listed first highlighted in boldface.

**Best Screenplay Written Directly for the Screen**: **Broadway Danny Rose, Written by Woody Allen**; El Norte, Written by Gregory Nava and Anna Thomas; Places in the Heart, Written by Robert Benton; Romancing the Stone, Written by Diane Thomas; Splash, Written by Lowell Ganz, Babaloo Mandel and Bruce Jay Friedman; Story by Brian Grazer	**Best Screenplay Based on Material from Another Medium**: **The Killing Fields, Screenplay by Bruce Robinson**; A Passage to India, Screenplay by David Lean; Based on the novel by E.M. Forster and the play by Santha Rama Rau; A Soldier's Story, Screenplay by Charles Fuller; Based on his play; Greystoke: The Legend of Tarzan, Screenplay by Robert Towne and Michael Austin; Based on the novel by Edgar Rice Burroughs; The Natural, Screenplay by Phil Dusenberry, and Roger Towne; Based on the novel by Bernard Malamud

=== Television ===
**Episodic Comedy**: **"Summer's Return" – Cheers (NBC) – Michael J. Weithorn**; "Night Shift" – AfterMASH (CBS) – Everett Greenbaum and Elliott Reid; "Affairs of the Heart" – Cheers (NBC) – Heide Perlman; "Old Flames" – Cheers (NBC) – David Angell; "Not an Affair to Remember" – Family Ties (NBC) – Gary David Goldberg and Ruth Bennett; "Once in Love with Harry" – Night Court (NBC) – Reinhold Weege; "Goodbye Buddy, Hello Skip" – The Duck Factory (NBC) – Allan Burns; "Shipmates" – Too Close for Comfort (ABC) – Arne Sultan and Earl Barret	**Episodic Drama**: **"Grace Under Pressure" – Hill Street Blues (NBC) – Jeffrey Lewis, Michael Wagner, Karen Hall, Mark Frost, Steven Bochco and David Milch**; "Victimless Crime" – Cagney & Lacey (CBS) – Peter Lefcourt; "Parting In Such Sweep Sorrow" – Hill Street Blues (NBC) – Jeffrey Lewis, Michael Wagner, David Milch, Mark Frost and Steven Bochco; "Death by Kiki" – Hill Street Blues (NBC) – David Milch and Mark Frost; "The Women" – St. Elsewhere (NBC) – John Ford Noonan, John Masius and Tom Fontana; "Hello, Goodbye" – St. Elsewhere (NBC) – John Masius and Tom Fontana; "Turnaround" – Trauma Center (ABC) – Harry Longstreet and Renee Longstreet
**Daytime Serials**: **Search for Tomorrow (NBC) – Gary Tomlin, Jeannie Glynn, Courtney Simon, Robin Amos, Norman Borisoff, Louisa Burns-Bisogno, Judy Lewis, Juliet Law Packer, Jule Selbo, Diane Silver, Noreen Stone, Emily Squires, Leslie Thomas, Phyllis White and Robert White**; Guiding Light (CBS) – Trent Jones, Christopher Whitesell, Pamela K. Long, Emily Squires, Pete T. Rich, Samuel D. Ratcliffe, Michelle Poteet Lisanti, Stephanie Braxton, Jay Hammer, Carolyn Culliton, Robin Amos, Addie Walsh, John Kuntz, Jeff Ryder and N. Gail Lawrence	**Adapted Drama Anthology**: **The Dollmaker – Susan Cooper and Hume Cronyn**
**Original/Adapted Comedy Anthology**: **Hobson's Choice (CBS) – Burt Prelutsky**	**Original Drama Anthology**: **The Day After (ABC) – Edward Hume**; Pope John Paul II (CBS) – Christopher Knopf
**Original/Adapted Multi-Part Long Form Series**: **The First Olympics: Athens 1896 (NBC) – Charles Gary Allison and William Bast**	**Children's Show**: **"The Greta Love Experiment" – ABC Afterschool Special (ABC) – Jeffrey Kindley**; "Cougar" – ABC Afterschool Special (ABC) – Stephen H. Foreman; "A Different Twist" – ABC Afterschool Special (ABC) – Dianne Dixon; "Goodbye Mr. Hooper" – Sesame Street (PBS) – Norman Stiles

=== Special awards ===
Laurel Award for Screenwriting Achievement
**William Goldman**
Laurel Award for TV Writing Achievement
**Danny Arnold**
Valentine Davies Award
**Charles Champlin**
Morgan Cox Award
**Edmund L. Hartmann**
Edmund J. North Award
**Mary C. McCall Jr.**
