= Writers Guild of America Award for Best Original Screenplay =

Writers Guild of America Award for Original Screenplay
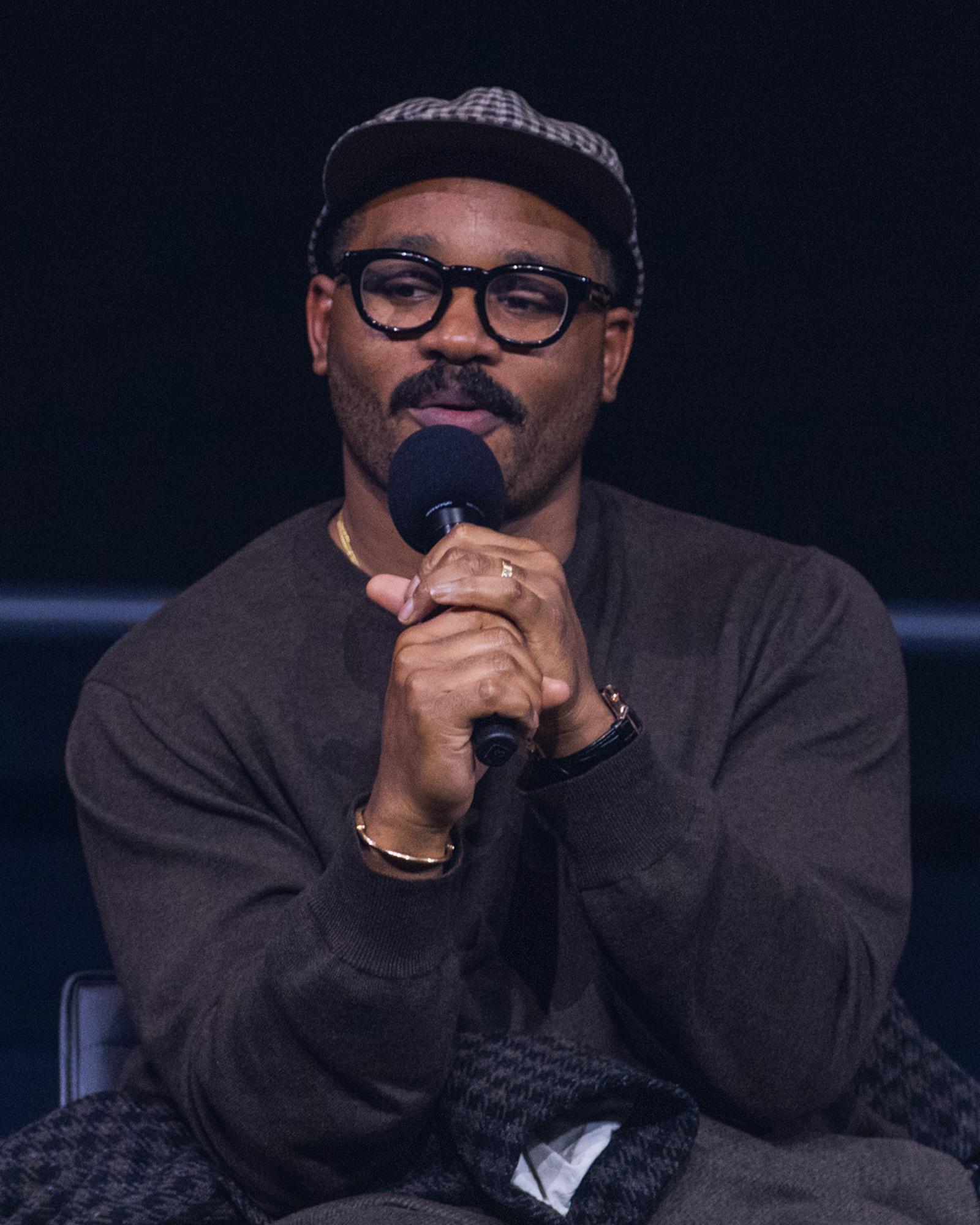
- The 2025 winner: Ryan Coogler
- Awarded for: Outstanding Writing for a Film Written Directly for the Screen
- Country: United States
- Presented by: Writers Guild of America
- First award: 1970
- Currently held by: Ryan Coogler, Sinners (2025)
- Website: http://www.wga.org/

The Writers Guild of America Award for Best Original Screenplay is one of the three film writing awards given by the Writers Guild of America.

Woody Allen holds the record for most wins and nominations for the award, with five wins out of twenty nominations.

== Notes ==
- † indicates an Academy Award for Best Original Screenplay winner
- ‡ indiates an Academy Award for Best Adapted Screenplay winner

== Winners and nominees ==
=== 1960s ===
Year	Film	Writer(s)
1969 (22nd)	Best Drama Written Directly for the Screen	
1969 (22nd)	Butch Cassidy and the Sundance Kid †	William Goldman
1969 (22nd)	Alice's Restaurant	Venable Herndon and Arthur Penn
1969 (22nd)	Downhill Racer	James Salter
1969 (22nd)	Easy Rider	Peter Fonda, Dennis Hopper, and Terry Southern
1969 (22nd)	Me, Natalie	A. Martin Zwelback
1969 (22nd)	Best Comedy Written Directly for the Screen	
1969 (22nd)	Bob & Carol & Ted & Alice	Paul Mazursky and Larry Tucker
1969 (22nd)	If It's Tuesday, This Must Be Belgium	David Shaw
1969 (22nd)	Popi	Tina Pine and Lester Pine
1969 (22nd)	Support Your Local Sheriff	William Bowers
1969 (22nd)	Take the Money and Run	Woody Allen and Mickey Rose

=== 1970s ===
Year	Film	Writer(s)
1970 (23rd)	Best Drama Written Directly for the Screen	
1970 (23rd)	Patton †	Francis Ford Coppola and Edmund H. North
1970 (23rd)	Five Easy Pieces	Carole Eastman (as Adrien Joyce)
1970 (23rd)	Love Story	Erich Segal
1970 (23rd)	Best Comedy Written Directly for the Screen	
1970 (23rd)	The Out-of-Towners	Neil Simon
1970 (23rd)	The Private Life of Sherlock Holmes	Billy Wilder and I.A.L. Diamond
1970 (23rd)	Quackser Fortune Has a Cousin in the Bronk	Gabriel Walsh
1970 (23rd)	Start the Revolution Without Me	Fred Freeman and Lawrence J. Cohen
1970 (23rd)	The Cheyenne Social Club	James Lee Barrett
1971 (24th)	Best Drama Written Directly for the Screen	
1971 (24th)	Sunday Bloody Sunday	Penelope Gilliatt
1971 (24th)	Klute	Andy Lewis and David E. Lewis
1971 (24th)	Summer of '42	Hernan Raucher
1971 (24th)	The Hellstrom Chronicle	David Seltzer
1971 (24th)	Best Comedy Written Directly for the Screen	
1971 (24th)	The Hospital †	Paddy Chayefsky
1971 (24th)	Bananas	Woody Allen and Mickey Rose
1971 (24th)	Carnal Knowledge	Jules Feiffer
1971 (24th)	Made for Each Other	Renée Taylor and Joseph Bologna
1971 (24th)	Taking Off	Miloṡ Forman, Jean-Claude Carrière, John Guare, and Jon Klein
1972 (25th)	Best Drama Written Directly for the Screen	
1972 (25th)	The Candidate †	Jeremy Larner
1972 (25th)	Bad Company	David Newman and Robert Benton
1972 (25th)	Images	Robert Altman
1972 (25th)	The Culpepper Cattle Co.	Eric Bercovici and Gregory Prentiss
1972 (25th)	The Great Northfield Minnesota Raid	Philip Kaufman
1972 (25th)	Best Comedy Written Directly for the Screen	
1972 (25th)	What’s Up, Doc?	Peter Bogdanovich, Buck Henry, David Newman, and Robert Benton
1972 (25th)	Get to Know Your Rabbit	Jordan Crittenden
1972 (25th)	Hammersmith Is Out	Stanford Whitmore
1972 (25th)	Minnie and Moskowitz	John Cassavetes
1972 (25th)	The War Between Men and Women	Melville Shavelson and Danny Arnold
1973 (26th)	Best Drama Written Directly for the Screen	
1973 (26th)	Save the Tiger	Steve Shagan
1973 (26th)	Mean Streets	Martin Scorsese and Mardik Martin
1973 (26th)	Payday	Don Carpenter
1973 (26th)	The Sting †	David S. Ward
1973 (26th)	The Way We Were	Arthur Laurents
1973 (26th)	Best Comedy Written Directly for the Screen	
1973 (26th)	A Touch of Class	Melvin Frank and Jack Rose
1973 (26th)	American Graffiti	George Lucas, Gloria Katz, and Willard Huyck
1973 (26th)	Blume in Love	Paul Mazursky
1973 (26th)	Sleeper	Woody Allen and Marshall Brickman
1973 (26th)	Slither	W.D. Richter
1974 (27th)	Best Drama Written Directly for the Screen	
1974 (27th)	Chinatown †	Robert Towne
1974 (27th)	A Woman Under the Influence	John Cassavetes
1974 (27th)	Alice Doesn't Live Here Anymore	Robert Getchell
1974 (27th)	Harry and Tonto	Paul Mazursky and Josh Greenfeld
1974 (27th)	The Conversation	Francis Ford Coppola
1974 (27th)	Best Comedy Written Directly for the Screen	
1974 (27th)	Blazing Saddles	Mel Brooks, Norman Steinberg, Andrew Bergman, Richard Pryor, and Alan Uger
1974 (27th)	California Split	Joseph Walsh
1974 (27th)	Claudine	Tina Pine and Lester Pine
1974 (27th)	Phantom of the Paradise	Brian de Palma
1974 (27th)	The Sugarland Express	Hal Barwood, Matthew Robbins, and Steven Spielberg
1975 (28th)	Best Drama Written Directly for the Screen	
1975 (28th)	Dog Day Afternoon †	Frank Pierson
1975 (28th)	French Connection II	Alexander Jacobs, Robert Dillon, and Laurie Dillon
1975 (28th)	Nashville	Joan Twekesbury
1975 (28th)	The Wind and the Lion	John Milius
1975 (28th)	Best Comedy Written Directly for the Screen	
1975 (28th)	Shampoo	Robert Towne and Warren Beatty
1975 (28th)	Heats of the West	Rob Thompson
1975 (28th)	Smile	Jerry Belson
1975 (28th)	The Return of the Pink Panther	Frank Waldman and Blake Edwards
1976 (29th)	Best Drama Written Directly for the Screen	
1976 (29th)	Network †	Paddy Chayefsky
1976 (29th)	The Omen	David Seltzer
1976 (29th)	Rocky	Sylvester Stallone
1976 (29th)	Taxi Driver	Paul Schrader
1976 (29th)	The Front	Walter Bernstein
1976 (29th)	Best Comedy Written Directly for the Screen	
1976 (29th)	The Bad News Bears	Bill Lancaster
1976 (29th)	Murder by Death	Neil Simon
1976 (29th)	Next Stop, Greenwich Village	Paul Mazursky
1976 (29th)	Silent Movie	Mel Brooks, Ron Clark, Rudy De Luca, and Barry Levinson
1976 (29th)	Silver Streak	Colin Higgins
1977 (30th)	Best Drama Written Directly for the Screen	
1977 (30th)	The Turning Point	Arthur Laurents
1977 (30th)	Close Encounters of the Third Kind	Steven Spielberg
1977 (30th)	Saturday Night Fever	Norman Wexler
1977 (30th)	The Late Show	Robert Benton
1977 (30th)	Best Comedy Written Directly for the Screen	
1977 (30th)	Annie Hall †	Woody Allen and Marshall Brickman
1977 (30th)	Star Wars	George Lucas
1977 (30th)	Slap Shot	Nancy Dowd
1977 (30th)	The Goodbye Girl	Neil Simon
1978 (31st)	Best Drama Written Directly for the Screen	
1978 (31st)	Coming Home †	Nancy Dowd, Robert C. Jones, and Waldo Salt
1978 (31st)	An Unmarried Woman	Paul Mazursky
1978 (31st)	Days of Heaven	Terrence Malick
1978 (31st)	Interiors	Woody Allen
1978 (31st)	The Deer Hunter	Deric Washburn, Michael Cimino, Louis Garfinkle, and Quinn K. Redeker
1978 (31st)	Best Comedy Written Directly for the Screen	
1978 (31st)	Movie Movie	Larry Gelbart and Sheldon Keller
1978 (31st)	A Wedding	John Considine, Patricia Resnick, Allan F. Nicholls, and Robert Altman
1978 (31st)	Animal House	Harold Ramis, Douglas Kenney, and Chris Miller
1978 (31st)	House Calls	Max Shulman, Julius J. Epstein, Alan Mandel, and Charles Shyer
1978 (31st)	Once in Paris...	Frank D. Gilroy
1979 (32nd)	Best Drama Written Directly for the Screen	
1979 (32nd)	The China Syndrome	Mike Gray, T. S. Cook, and James Bridges
1979 (32nd)	Apocalypse Now	John Milius and Francis Ford Coppola
1979 (32nd)	Best Comedy Written Directly for the Screen	
1979 (32nd)	Breaking Away †	Steve Tesich
1979 (32nd)	10	Blake Edwards
1979 (32nd)	Manhattan	Woody Allen and Marshall Brickman

=== 1980s ===
Year	Film	Writer(s)
1980 (33rd)	Best Drama Written Directly for the Screen	
1980 (33rd)	Melvin and Howard †	Bo Goldman
1980 (33rd)	Fame	Christopher Gore
1980 (33rd)	My Bodyguard	Alan Ornsby
1980 (33rd)	Best Comedy Written Directly for the Screen	
1980 (33rd)	Private Benjamin	Nancy Meyers, Harvey Miller, and Charles Shyer
1980 (33rd)	Nine to Five	Colin Higgins and Patricia Resnick
1980 (33rd)	Return of the Secaucus 7	John Sayles
1980 (33rd)	Stardust Memories	Woody Allen
1981 (34th)	Best Drama Written Directly for the Screen	
1981 (34th)	Reds	Warren Beatty and Trevor Griffiths
1981 (34th)	Absence of Malice	Kurt Luedtke
1981 (34th)	Atlantic City	John Guare
1981 (34th)	Body Heat	Lawrence Kasdan
1981 (34th)	Best Comedy Written Directly for the Screen	
1981 (34th)	Arthur	Steve Gordon
1981 (34th)	Raiders of the Lost Ark	Lawrence Kasdan, George Lucas, and Philip Kaufman
1981 (34th)	S.O.B.	Blake Edwards
1981 (34th)	The Four Seasons	Alan Alda
1982 (35th)	Best Drama Written Directly for the Screen	
1982 (35th)	E.T. the Extra-Terrestrial	Melissa Mathison
1982 (35th)	An Officer and a Gentleman	Douglas Day Stewart
1982 (35th)	Shoot the Moon	Bo Goldman
1982 (35th)	Best Comedy Written Directly for the Screen	
1982 (35th)	Tootsie	Don McGuire, Larry Gelbart, and Murray Schisgal
1982 (35th)	Diner	Barry Levinson
1982 (35th)	My Favorite Year	Norman Steinberg and Dennis Palumbo
1983 (36th)	Best Drama Written Directly for the Screen	
1983 (36th)	Tender Mercies †	Horton Foote
1983 (36th)	Silkwood	Nora Ephron and Alice Arlen
1983 (36th)	WarGames	Lawrence Lasker and Walter F. Parkes
1983 (36th)	Best Comedy Written Directly for the Screen	
1983 (36th)	The Big Chill	Lawrence Kasdan and Barbara Benedek
1983 (36th)	Risky Business	Paul Brickman
1983 (36th)	Zelig	Woody Allen
1984 (37th)	Broadway Danny Rose	Woody Allen
1984 (37th)	El Norte	Gregory Nava and Anna Thomas
1984 (37th)	Places in the Heart †	Robert Benton
1984 (37th)	Romancing the Stone	Diane Thomas
1984 (37th)	Splash	Lowell Ganz, Babaloo Mandel, Bruce Jay Friedman and Brian Grazer
1985 (38th)	Witness †	William Kelley and Earl W. Wallace
1985 (38th)	Back to the Future	Robert Zemeckis and Bob Gale
1985 (38th)	Cocoon	Tom Benedek
1985 (38th)	Mask	Anna Hamilton Phelan
1985 (38th)	The Purple Rose of Cairo	Woody Allen
1986 (39th)	Hannah and Her Sisters †	Woody Allen
1986 (39th)	Blue Velvet	David Lynch
1986 (39th)	Mona Lisa	Neil Jordan and David Leland
1986 (39th)	Platoon	Oliver Stone
1986 (39th)	Salvador	Richard Boyle and Oliver Stone
1987 (40th)	Moonstruck †	John Patrick Shanley
1987 (40th)	Broadcast News	James L. Brooks
1987 (40th)	Hope and Glory	John Boorman
1987 (40th)	The Last Emperor	Bernardo Bertolucci and Mark Peploe
1987 (40th)	Radio Days	Woody Allen
1988 (41st)	Bull Durham	Ron Shelton
1988 (41st)	Big	Gary Ross and Anne Spielberg
1988 (41st)	A Fish Called Wanda	John Cleese and Charles Crichton
1988 (41st)	Rain Man †	Ronald Bass and Barry Morrow
1988 (41st)	Working Girl	Kevin Wade
1989 (42nd)	Crimes and Misdemeanors	Woody Allen
1989 (42nd)	Dead Poets Society †	Tom Schulman
1989 (42nd)	The Fabulous Baker Boys	Steve Kloves
1989 (42nd)	Sex, Lies, and Videotape	Steven Soderbergh
1989 (42nd)	When Harry Met Sally...	Nora Ephron

=== 1990s ===
Year	Film	Writer(s)
1990 (43rd)	Avalon	Barry Levinson
1990 (43rd)	Alice	Woody Allen
1990 (43rd)	Ghost †	Bruce Joel Rubin
1990 (43rd)	Green Card	Peter Weir
1990 (43rd)	Pretty Woman	J. F. Lawton
1991 (44th)	Thelma & Louise †	Callie Khouri
1991 (44th)	Boyz n the Hood	John Singleton
1991 (44th)	Bugsy	James Toback
1991 (44th)	The Fisher King	Richard LaGravenese
1991 (44th)	Grand Canyon	Lawrence and Meg Kasdan
1992 (45th)	The Crying Game †	Neil Jordan
1992 (45th)	Husbands and Wives	Woody Allen
1992 (45th)	Lorenzo's Oil	Nick Enright and George Miller
1992 (45th)	Passion Fish	John Sayles
1992 (45th)	Unforgiven	David Webb Peoples
1993 (46th)	The Piano †	Jane Campion
1993 (46th)	Dave	Gary Ross
1993 (46th)	In the Line of Fire	Jeff Maguire
1993 (46th)	Philadelphia	Ron Nyswaner
1993 (46th)	Sleepless in Seattle	Jeff Arch, Nora Ephron, and David S. Ward
1994 (47th)	Four Weddings and a Funeral	Richard Curtis
1994 (47th)	The Adventures of Priscilla, Queen of the Desert	Stephan Elliott
1994 (47th)	Bullets over Broadway	Woody Allen and Douglas McGrath
1994 (47th)	Ed Wood	Scott Alexander and Larry Karaszewski
1994 (47th)	Heavenly Creatures	Peter Jackson and Fran Walsh
1995 (48th)	Braveheart	Randall Wallace
1995 (48th)	The American President	Aaron Sorkin
1995 (48th)	Clueless	Amy Heckerling
1995 (48th)	Mighty Aphrodite	Woody Allen
1995 (48th)	Muriel's Wedding	P. J. Hogan
1996 (49th)	Fargo †	Joel Coen and Ethan Coen
1996 (49th)	Jerry Maguire	Cameron Crowe
1996 (49th)	Lone Star	John Sayles
1996 (49th)	Secrets & Lies	Mike Leigh
1996 (49th)	Shine	Scott Hicks and Jan Sardi
1997 (50th)	As Good as It Gets	James L. Brooks and Mark Andrus
1997 (50th)	Boogie Nights	Paul Thomas Anderson
1997 (50th)	The Full Monty	Simon Beaufoy
1997 (50th)	Good Will Hunting †	Ben Affleck and Matt Damon
1997 (50th)	Titanic	James Cameron
1998 (51st)	Shakespeare in Love †	Marc Norman and Tom Stoppard
1998 (51st)	Bulworth	Warren Beatty and Jeremy Pikser
1998 (51st)	The Opposite of Sex	Don Roos
1998 (51st)	Saving Private Ryan	Robert Rodat
1998 (51st)	The Truman Show	Andrew Niccol
1999 (52nd)	American Beauty †	Alan Ball
1999 (52nd)	Being John Malkovich	Charlie Kaufman
1999 (52nd)	Magnolia	Paul Thomas Anderson
1999 (52nd)	The Sixth Sense	M. Night Shyamalan
1999 (52nd)	Three Kings	John Ridley and David O. Russell

=== 2000s ===
Year	Film	Writer(s)
2000 (53rd)	You Can Count on Me	Kenneth Lonergan
2000 (53rd)	Almost Famous †	Cameron Crowe
2000 (53rd)	Best in Show	Christopher Guest and Eugene Levy
2000 (53rd)	Billy Elliot	Lee Hall
2000 (53rd)	Erin Brockovich	Susannah Grant
2001 (54th)	Gosford Park †	Julian Fellowes
2001 (54th)	The Man Who Wasn't There	Joel Coen and Ethan Coen
2001 (54th)	Monster's Ball	Milo Addica and Will Rokos
2001 (54th)	Moulin Rouge!	Baz Luhrmann and Craig Pearce
2001 (54th)	The Royal Tenenbaums	Wes Anderson and Owen Wilson
2002 (55th)	Bowling for Columbine	Michael Moore
2002 (55th)	Antwone Fisher	Antwone Fisher
2002 (55th)	Far from Heaven	Todd Haynes
2002 (55th)	Gangs of New York	Jay Cocks, Kenneth Lonergan, and Steven Zaillian
2002 (55th)	My Big Fat Greek Wedding	Nia Vardalos
2003 (56th)	Lost in Translation †	Sofia Coppola
2003 (56th)	Bend It Like Beckham	Paul Mayeda Berges, Guljit Bindra, and Gurinder Chadha
2003 (56th)	Dirty Pretty Things	Steven Knight
2003 (56th)	In America	Jim Sheridan, Naomi Sheridan, and Kirsten Sheridan
2003 (56th)	The Station Agent	Thomas McCarthy
2004 (57th)	Eternal Sunshine of the Spotless Mind †	Pierre Bismuth, Michel Gondry, Charlie Kaufman
2004 (57th)	The Aviator	John Logan
2004 (57th)	Garden State	Zach Braff
2004 (57th)	Hotel Rwanda	Terry George and Keir Pearson
2004 (57th)	Kinsey	Bill Condon
2005 (58th)	Crash †	Paul Haggis and Bobby Moresco
2005 (58th)	The 40-Year-Old Virgin	Judd Apatow and Steve Carell
2005 (58th)	Cinderella Man	Akiva Goldsman and Cliff Hollingsworth
2005 (58th)	Good Night, and Good Luck.	George Clooney and Grant Heslov
2005 (58th)	The Squid and the Whale	Noah Baumbach
2006 (59th)	Little Miss Sunshine †	Michael Arndt
2006 (59th)	Babel	Guillermo Arriaga
2006 (59th)	The Queen	Peter Morgan
2006 (59th)	Stranger than Fiction	Zach Helm
2006 (59th)	United 93	Paul Greengrass
2007 (60th)	Juno †	Diablo Cody
2007 (60th)	Knocked Up	Judd Apatow
2007 (60th)	Lars and the Real Girl	Nancy Oliver
2007 (60th)	Michael Clayton	Tony Gilroy
2007 (60th)	The Savages	Tamara Jenkins
2008 (61st)	Milk †	Dustin Lance Black
2008 (61st)	Burn After Reading	Joel Coen and Ethan Coen
2008 (61st)	Vicky Cristina Barcelona	Woody Allen
2008 (61st)	The Visitor	Tom McCarthy
2008 (61st)	The Wrestler	Robert Siegel
2009 (62nd)	The Hurt Locker †	Mark Boal
2009 (62nd)	(500) Days of Summer	Scott Neustadter and Michael H. Weber
2009 (62nd)	Avatar	James Cameron
2009 (62nd)	The Hangover	Jon Lucas and Scott Moore
2009 (62nd)	A Serious Man	Joel Coen and Ethan Coen

=== 2010s ===
Year	Film	Writer(s)
2010 (63rd)	Inception	Christopher Nolan
2010 (63rd)	Black Swan	Mark Heyman, Andres Heinz, and John McLaughlin
2010 (63rd)	The Fighter	Scott Silver, Paul Tamasy, Eric Johnson, and Keith Dorrington
2010 (63rd)	The Kids Are All Right	Lisa Cholodenko and Stuart Blumberg
2010 (63rd)	Please Give	Nicole Holofcener
2011 (64th)	Midnight in Paris †	Woody Allen
2011 (64th)	50/50	Will Reiser
2011 (64th)	Bridesmaids	Annie Mumolo and Kristen Wiig
2011 (64th)	Win Win	Tom McCarthy
2011 (64th)	Young Adult	Diablo Cody
2012 (65th)	Zero Dark Thirty	Mark Boal
2012 (65th)	Flight	John Gatins
2012 (65th)	Looper	Rian Johnson
2012 (65th)	The Master	Paul Thomas Anderson
2012 (65th)	Moonrise Kingdom	Wes Anderson and Roman Coppola
2013 (66th)	Her †	Spike Jonze
2013 (66th)	American Hustle	Eric Warren Singer and David O. Russell
2013 (66th)	Blue Jasmine	Woody Allen
2013 (66th)	Dallas Buyers Club	Craig Borten and Melisa Wallack
2013 (66th)	Nebraska	Bob Nelson
2014 (67th)	The Grand Budapest Hotel	Wes Anderson and Hugo Guinness
2014 (67th)	Boyhood	Richard Linklater
2014 (67th)	Foxcatcher	E. Max Frye and Dan Futterman
2014 (67th)	Nightcrawler	Dan Gilroy
2014 (67th)	Whiplash	Damien Chazelle
2015 (68th)	Spotlight †	Tom McCarthy and Josh Singer
2015 (68th)	Bridge of Spies	Matt Charman, Joel Coen, and Ethan Coen
2015 (68th)	Sicario	Taylor Sheridan
2015 (68th)	Straight Outta Compton	Jonathan Herman, Andrea Berloff, S. Leigh Savidge, and Alan Wenkus
2015 (68th)	Trainwreck	Amy Schumer
2016 (69th)	Moonlight ‡	Barry Jenkins and Tarell Alvin McCraney
2016 (69th)	Hell or High Water	Taylor Sheridan
2016 (69th)	La La Land	Damien Chazelle
2016 (69th)	Loving	Jeff Nichols
2016 (69th)	Manchester by the Sea †	Kenneth Lonergan
2017 (70th)	Get Out †	Jordan Peele
2017 (70th)	The Big Sick	Emily V. Gordon & Kumail Nanjiani
2017 (70th)	I, Tonya	Steven Rogers
2017 (70th)	Lady Bird	Greta Gerwig
2017 (70th)	The Shape of Water	Guillermo del Toro & Vanessa Taylor
2018 (71st)	Eighth Grade	Bo Burnham
2018 (71st)	Green Book †	Nick Vallelonga, Brian Currie & Peter Farrelly
2018 (71st)	A Quiet Place	Bryan Woods & Scott Beck and John Krasinski
2018 (71st)	Roma	Alfonso Cuarón
2018 (71st)	Vice	Adam McKay
2019 (72nd)	Parasite †	Bong Joon-ho and Han Jin-won
2019 (72nd)	1917	Sam Mendes & Krysty Wilson-Cairns
2019 (72nd)	Booksmart	Emily Halpern & Sarah Haskins and Susanna Fogel and Katie Silberman
2019 (72nd)	Knives Out	Rian Johnson
2019 (72nd)	Marriage Story	Noah Baumbach

=== 2020s ===
Year	Film	Writer(s)
2020 (73rd)	Promising Young Woman †	Emerald Fennell
2020 (73rd)	Judas and the Black Messiah	Will Berson & Shaka King and Kenny Lucas & Keith Lucas
2020 (73rd)	Palm Springs	Andy Siara & Max Barbakow
2020 (73rd)	Sound of Metal	Darius Marder & Abraham Marder & Derek Cianfrance
2020 (73rd)	The Trial of the Chicago 7	Aaron Sorkin
2021 (74th)	Don't Look Up	Adam McKay & David Sirota
2021 (74th)	Being the Ricardos	Aaron Sorkin
2021 (74th)	The French Dispatch	Wes Anderson & Roman Coppola & Hugo Guinness & Jason Schwartzman
2021 (74th)	King Richard	Zach Baylin
2021 (74th)	Licorice Pizza	Paul Thomas Anderson
2022 (75th)	Everything Everywhere All at Once †	Daniel Kwan & Daniel Scheinert
2022 (75th)	The Fabelmans	Steven Spielberg & Tony Kushner
2022 (75th)	The Menu	Seth Reiss & Will Tracy
2022 (75th)	Nope	Jordan Peele
2022 (75th)	Tár	Todd Field
2023 (76th)	The Holdovers	David Hemingson
2023 (76th)	Air	Alex Convery
2023 (76th)	Barbie	Greta Gerwig & Noah Baumbach
2023 (76th)	May December	Samy Burch & Alex Mechanik
2023 (76th)	Past Lives	Celine Song
2024 (77th)	Anora †	Sean Baker
2024 (77th)	A Real Pain	Jesse Eisenberg
2024 (77th)	Challengers	Justin Kuritzkes
2024 (77th)	Civil War	Alex Garland
2024 (77th)	My Old Ass	Megan Park
2025 (78th)	Sinners †	Ryan Coogler
2025 (78th)	Black Bag	David Koepp
2025 (78th)	If I Had Legs I'd Kick You	Mary Bronstein
2025 (78th)	Marty Supreme	Ronald Bronstein & Josh Safdie
2025 (78th)	Weapons	Zach Cregger

== Writers with multiple awards ==
5 Awards

- Woody Allen

2 Awards

- Warren Beatty
- Mark Boal
- Paddy Chayefsky
- Larry Gelbart
- Robert Towne

== Writers with multiple nominations ==
20 Nominations

- Woody Allen

5 Nominations

- Ethan Coen
- Joel Coen
- Paul Mazursky

4 Nominations

- Paul Thomas Anderson
- Wes Anderson
- Robert Benton
- Lawrence Kasdan
- Thomas McCarthy

3 Nominations

- Noah Baumbach
- Warren Beatty
- Marshall Brickman
- Francis Ford Coppola
- Blake Edwards
- Nora Ephron
- Barry Levinson
- Kenneth Lonergan
- George Lucas
- John Sayles
- Neil Simon
- Aaron Sorkin
- Steven Spielberg

2 Nominations

- Judd Apatow
- Mark Boal
- James L. Brooks
- James Cameron
- Paddy Chayefsky
- Damien Chazelle
- Diablo Cody
- Roman Coppola
- Cameron Crowe
- Larry Gelbart
- Greta Gerwig
- Hugo Guinness
- Rian Johnson
- Neil Jordan
- Charlie Kaufman
- Adam McKay
- Jordan Peele
- Gary Ross
- David O. Russell
- Taylor Sheridan
- Oliver Stone
- Robert Towne

== See also ==
- Academy Award for Best Original Screenplay
- BAFTA Award for Best Original Screenplay
- Critics' Choice Movie Award for Best Screenplay
