= Lois Dwight Cole =

American editor and children's author (1903–1979)

Lois Dwight Cole Taylor (1903 – 20 July 1979) was an American editor and writer of children's literature. She wrote with her husband Allan Taylor as Allan Dwight. Their most successful novel was Drums in the Forest, first printed in 1936 and up to a 22nd printing in 1970. Most of her own novels were written as Anne Elliot. She also wrote as Anne Lattin, Nancy Dudley, Lynn Avery and Caroline Arnett.

When working at Macmillan Publishers, she met Margaret Mitchell. Lois Cole was the first person outside the Mitchell family to read Gone with the Wind.

== Biography ==
Lois Dwight Cole was born in 1903 in New York City. She received her BA at Smith College in Northampton, Massachusetts in 1924. She worked at Macmillan Publishers, who sent her from New York to Atlanta in 1927. There she met Peggy Mitchell Marsh (who became better known by her pen-name Margaret Mitchell), and they became lifelong friends. Peggy introduced her to Turney Allan Taylor, a bachelor journalist, who later became Cole's husband. Cole and Taylor had two children.

When Cole learned that Mitchell was writing a novel, she asked to see it, but Mitchell refused to let her or anyone else read it. Macmillan sent Lois back to New York in 1930, and promoted her to associate editor. Cole continued inquiring after Mitchell's novel, and in 1933 Mitchell replied that Lois would be the first to read it if it ever got finished. Cole introduced her boss, editor Harold Latham, to Mitchell in 1935. In April 1935, Mitchell gave him the manuscript to read, and Latham sent it on to Cole after having read the first few chapters. Mitchell later said that "John and Lois are the only persons I ever discussed it with in any detail" before she gave the manuscript to Latham. She continued to assist Mitchell and her husband John on one hand, and Latham on the other hand, in getting the book to a finished state. She edited the blurb, written by John, to its final state. Cole also promoted the book before its release, making sure that it was included in the Book of the Month Club selection. Finally, in April 1936, Macmillan produced the first printing of Gone with the Wind by Margaret Mitchell.

She then worked as editor at Whittlesey House and G. P. Putnam's Sons, before becoming the senior editor at first William Morrow and Company and finally Walker and Company. Cole died in 1979.

== Bibliography ==
- 1932: Timothy's Shoes and Two Other Stories by Juliana Horatio Ewing, adapted by Lois Dwight Cole
- 1933: Spaniard's Mark (as Allan Dwight)
- 1934: Linn Dickson Confederate (as Allan Dwight)
- 1936: Drums in the Forest (as Allan Dwight, pseudonym of Cole and her husband Allan Taylor) (reprinted 1967; translated into French in 1958)
- 1936: The First Virginians (as Allan Dwight) (reprinted 1938)
- 1939: Kentucky Cargo (as Allan Dwight)
- 1943: Linda Goes to the Hospital (as Nancy Dudley)
- 1953: Peter Liked to Draw (as Anne Lattin)
- 1955: Linda Travels Alone (as Nancy Dudley)
- 1956: Linda's First Flight (as Nancy Dudley)
- 1957: Linda Goes to a TV Studio (as Nancy Dudley)
- 1958: Linda Goes on a Cruise (as Nancy Dudley)
- 1958: Peter's Policeman (as Anne Lattin)
- 1959: The Silver Dagger (as Allan Dwight)
- 1962: Dorie of Dogtown Common (as Anne Elliot)
- 1962: Guns at Quebec (as Allan Dwight)
- 1963: The mystery of the vanishing horses (as Lynn Avery)
- 1965: Soldier and Patriot: The Life of General Israel Putnam (as Allan Dwight)
- 1967: Return to Aylforth (as Anne Elliot)
- 1967: To the Walls of Cartagena (as Allan Dwight)
- 1968: Sparky's Fireman (as Anne Lattin)
- 1969: Shadows Waiting (as Anne Elliot)
- 1971: Stranger at Pembroke (as Anne Elliot)
- 1972: Incident at Villa Rahmana (as Anne Elliot) (reprinted in 1975: translated in German in 1974)
- 1974: The Dark Beneath the Pines (as Anne Elliot)
