= Jeanne Glynn =

American screenwriter

Jeanne Glynn (1932 – June 8, 2007) was a writer. Jeanne Glynn died of cancer at age 75. Glynn was an actress who turned to writing. Her writing earned her five Daytime Emmy Award nominations. Glynn's nominations came for her work on General Hospital, Guiding Light, As the World Turns, One Life to Live and Port Charles. Other writing credits include Search for Tomorrow.

== Acting career ==
Glynn appeared in the 1957 TV version of Oedipus, The King which starred Christopher Plummer. The show was part of the Omnibus TV series. Plummer reprised his role in a 1967 feature film.
