= Michael Lazarou =

American screenwriter and producer

Michael Lazarou (born March 17, 1960, in Los Angeles, California) is an American film and television writer/producer.

== Biography ==
Lazarou began his career as story editor for the half-hour television comedy Doogie Howser, M.D. and the one-hour drama The Untouchables. He wrote the screenplays for the TV movies Heat Wave and Possessed, and for feature films Take the A Train and Satin Doll.

He adapted his semi-autobiographical novel Criminal Law into a film for HBO. This was followed up with The Stanford Prison Experiment, originally developed for television for HBO, but later acquired by Artisan Entertainment as a motion picture.

Lazarou, is dyslexic and dysgraphic and was unable to read or write until he was nearly ten years old. He is a graduate of UCLA, New York University and the AFI Center For Advanced Film Studies.

After a four-year career absence due to a near-fatal kidney ailment, he returned to establish High Road Productions with wife Charisse McGhee, a former Vice President of Primetime Series at NBC and Lifetime Television.

=== Personal life ===
Lazarou was married to Melissa Tucker in 1981. They divorced in 1983. In 1991 he married Charisse McGhee. Lazarou and McGhee have since had four children together.

== Awards ==
For his script for Heat Wave, a fact-based drama about the 1965 Watts Riots, Lazarou won the Writers Guild of America (WGA) Paul Selvin Award, and was nominated for the WGA Award for Outstanding Achievement in Original Long Form.

== Sources ==
- Michael Lazarou at IMDb
- Michael Lazarou videography at Niad Management
- Michael Lazarou articles at Variety

== Videography ==
- Heat Wave (1990) at IMDb
- Take the 'A' Train (1990) at IMDb
- Satin Doll (1994) at IMDb
- Possessed (2000) at IMDb
