= Laurel Award for TV Writing Achievement =

Honorary award by the Writers Guild of America

The Laurel Award for TV Writing Achievement is an honorary award presented by the Writers Guild of America for the greatest achievement in television writing. Along with the Laurel Award for Screenwriting Achievement, it is one of two lifetime achievement awards rewarded each year at the Writers Guild of America Awards.

== Winners ==
Year	Recipient(s)
1976	Rod Serling
1977	James Fritzell & Everett Greenbaum
1978	Ernest Kinoy
1979	James Costigan
1980	Howard Rodman
1981	Larry Gelbart
1982	John McGreevey
1983	Herbert Baker
1984	John Gay
1985	Danny Arnold
1986	Richard Levinson & William Link
1987	Reginald Rose
1988	Bob Schiller & Bob Weiskopf
1989	Hal Kanter
1990	David Shaw
1991	Carol Sobieski
1992	Madelyn Davis, Bob Carroll, Jr. & Jess Oppenheimer
1993	Norman Lear
1994	Steven Bochco
1995	Carl Reiner
1996	Paul Henning
1997	David W. Rintels
1998	James L. Brooks & Allan Burns
1999	David Milch
2000	Paul Monash
2001	David Lloyd
2002	Glen Charles & Les Charles
2003	David E. Kelley
2004	Loring Mandel
2005	Susan Harris
2006	Stephen J. Cannell
2007	John Wells
2008	David Chase
2009	William Blinn
2010	Larry David
2011	Diane English
2012	Marshall Herskovitz & Edward Zwick
2013	Joshua Brand & John Falsey
2014	Garry Marshall
2015	Shonda Rhimes
2016	Marta Kauffman & David Crane
2017	Aaron Sorkin
2018	Alison Cross
2019	Jenji Kohan
2020	Merrill Markoe
2021	No award
2022	No award
2023	Yvette Lee Bowser
2024	Linda Bloodworth Thomason
2025	Vince Gilligan
2026	Don Reo
