= Laurel Award for Screenwriting Achievement =

Lifetime achievement award given by the Writers Guild of America

Writers Guild of America Laurel Award for Screenwriting Achievement
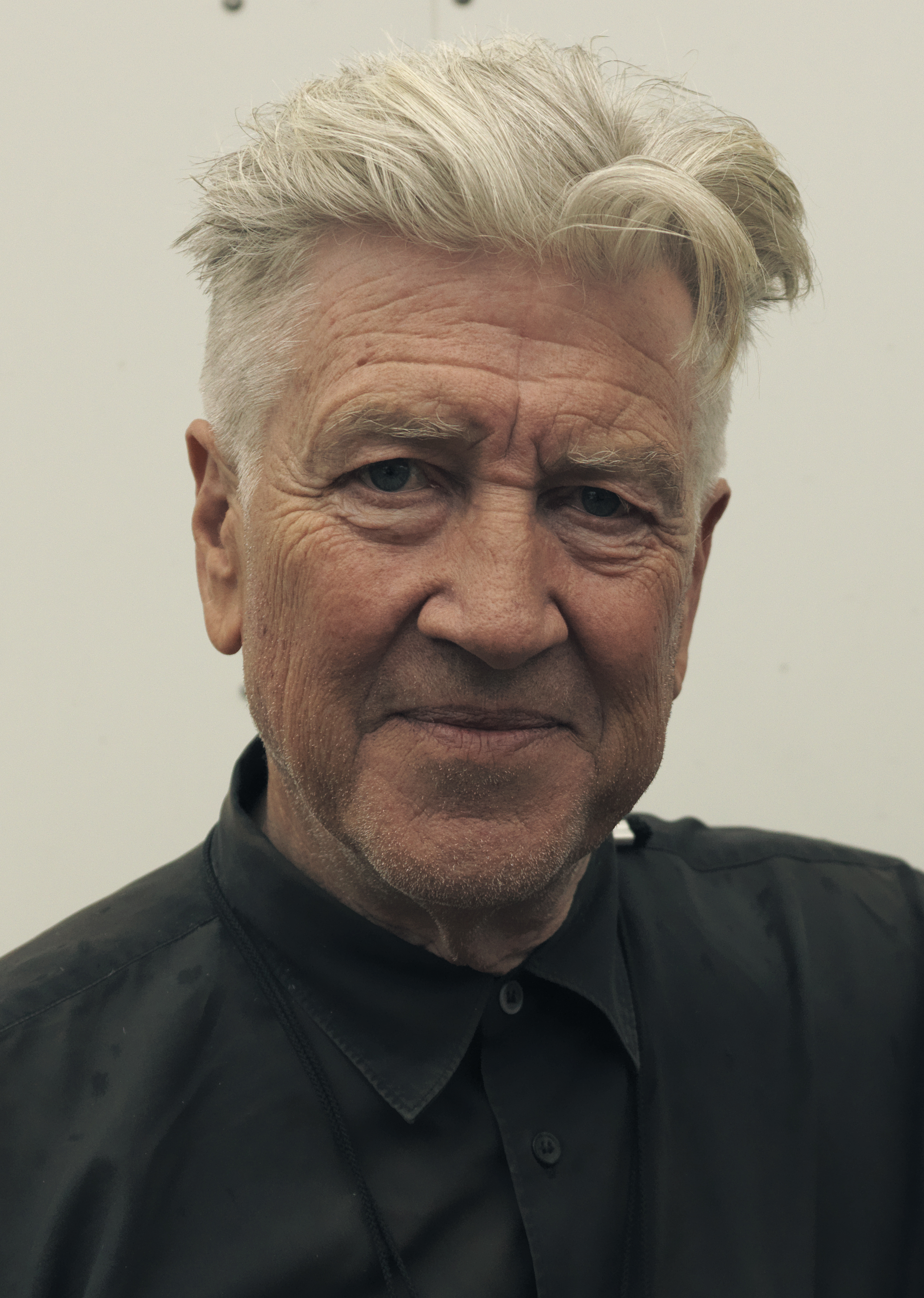
- 2025 recipient: David Lynch
- Country: United States
- Presented by: Writers Guild of America
- First award: 1953
- Most recent recipient(s): James Cameron
- Website: https://www.wga.org

The Laurel Award for Screenwriting Achievement (also known as the Screen Laurel Award) is a lifetime achievement award given by the Writers Guild of America. It is given "to that member of the Guild who, in the opinion of the current Board of Directors, has advanced the literature of the motion picture through the years, and who has made outstanding contributions to the profession of the screen writer." With the exception of 2009, 2021, and 2022 in which no awards were given, it has been presented annually since the 6th Writers Guild of America Awards in 1953. Billy Wilder is the only person to win the award multiple times, winning in 1957 and 1980 (both as part of a partnership).

== Recipients ==
=== 1950s ===
Year	Recipient(s)
1953	Sonya Levien
1954	Dudley Nichols
1955	Robert Riskin
1956	Julius Epstein & Philip Epstein and Albert Hackett & Frances Goodrich
1957	Charles Brackett & Billy Wilder
1958	John Lee Mahin
1959	Nunnally Johnson

=== 1960s ===
Year	Recipient(s)
1960	Norman Krasna
1961	George Seaton
1962	Philip Dunne
1963	Joseph L. Mankiewicz
1964	John Huston
1965	Sidney Buchman
1966	Isobel Lennart
1967	Richard Brooks
1968	Casey Robinson
1969	Carl Foreman

=== 1970s ===
Year	Recipient(s)
1970	Dalton Trumbo
1971	James Poe
1972	Ernest Lehman
1973	William Rose
1974	Paddy Chayefsky
1975	Preston Sturges
1976	Michael Wilson
1977	Samson Raphaelson
1978	Edward Anhalt
1979	Neil Simon

=== 1980s ===
Year	Recipient(s)
1980	Billy Wilder & I. A. L. Diamond
1981	Ben Hecht
1982	Paul Osborn
1983	Lamar Trotti
1984	Melville Shavelson, Jack Rose, Norman Panama, and Melvin Frank
1985	William Goldman
1986	Waldo Salt
1987	Woody Allen
1988	Irving Ravetch & Harriet Frank Jr.
1989	Ring Lardner Jr.

=== 1990s ===
Year	Recipient(s)
1990	Donald Ogden Stewart
1991	Alvin Sargent
1992	Frank Pierson
1993	Horton Foote
1994	Ruth Prawer Jhabvala
1995	Charles Bennett
1996	Daniel Taradash
1997	Robert Towne
1998	Bo Goldman
1999	Paul Schrader

=== 2000s ===
Year	Recipient(s)
2000	Jean-Claude Carrière
2001	Betty Comden and Adolph Green
2002	Blake Edwards
2003	Mel Brooks
2004	John Michael Hayes
2005	David Mamet
2006	Lawrence Kasdan
2007	Robert Benton
2008	Budd Schulberg
2009	No award given

=== 2010s ===
Year	Recipient(s)
2010	Barry Levinson
2011	Steven Zaillian
2012	Eric Roth
2013	Tom Stoppard
2014	Paul Mazursky
2015	Harold Ramis
2016	Elaine May
2017	Oliver Stone
2018	James L. Brooks
2019	Lowell Ganz and Babaloo Mandel

=== 2020s ===
Year	Recipient(s)
2020	Nancy Meyers
2021	No Award
2022	No Award
2023	Charlie Kaufman
2024	Walter Hill
2025	David Lynch
2026	James Cameron
