= Christopher Knopf =

American screenwriter and union executive (1927–2019)

- Born: Christopher Edwin Knopf; December 20, 1927; New York City, U.S.
- Died: February 13, 2019 (aged 91)
- Education: University of California, Los Angeles; University of California, Berkeley
- Occupations: Screenwriter, union executive
- Spouse(s): Betty McKeehan (m. 1951; div. 1969); Elaine Dabich (m. 1972; div. 1974); Lorraine Curry (m. 1975)
- Children: 3
- Parent: Edwin H. Knopf

Christopher Edwin Knopf (December 20, 1927 – February 13, 2019) was an American screenwriter and union executive. He served as the president of the Writers Guild of America West (WGAW) and the International Affiliation of Writers Guilds (IAWG). He won two awards from the WGAW: the Morgan Cox Award in 1991 and the Edmund H. North Award in 2002.

== Works ==
- Knopf, Christopher (2010). Will the Real Me Please Stand Up?. Albany, Georgia: BearManor Media. ISBN 978-1-59393-525-2. OCLC 711185216.
