= Sterling Jerins =

American actress

- Occupation: Actress
- Years active: 2011–present
- Relatives: Ruby Jerins (sister)

Sterling Jerins is an American actress known for playing Lily Bowers on the NBC series Deception, Constance Lane in World War Z, Judy Warren in The Conjuring, The Conjuring 2 and The Conjuring: The Devil Made Me Do It, and Lila DuFresne on HBO's comedy series Divorce.

== Career ==
In 2012, Jerins was added to the cast of the zombie apocalypse film World War Z, directed by Marc Forster, to play the role of Constance Lane, the younger daughter of Gerry (Brad Pitt) and Karen Lane (Mireille Enos). The film was released on June 21, 2013. She then appeared in The Conjuring, a supernatural horror film directed by James Wan, which was released on July 19, 2013. Jerins played Judy Warren, the daughter of Ed and Lorraine Warren (Patrick Wilson and Vera Farmiga).

Jerins co-starred in the romantic comedy And So It Goes, directed by Rob Reiner, playing the supporting role of Michael Douglas' character's granddaughter. In 2015, Jerins co-starred in the mystery thriller Dark Places, based on the novel of same name written by Gillian Flynn. Jerins played a young version of Charlize Theron's lead character Libby Day. Also that same year, she co-starred with Owen Wilson and Lake Bell in the action thriller film No Escape.

In 2016, she reprised her role as Judy Warren in the supernatural horror film sequel The Conjuring 2. She also co-starred in the HBO comedy series Divorce, with Sarah Jessica Parker and Thomas Haden Church.

== Filmography ==
=== Film ===
Year	Title	Role	Notes
2013	Butterflies of Bill Baker	Annie	
2013	World War Z	Constance Lane	
2013	The Conjuring	Judy Warren	
2014	Lullaby	Young Karen	
2014	And So It Goes	Sarah Little	
2014	5 Flights Up	Zoe	
2015	Dark Places	Young Libby Day	
2015	No Escape	Lucy Dwyer	
2016	Paterson	Young Poet	
2016	The Conjuring 2	Judy Warren	
2017	Daisy Winters	Daisy Winters	
2018	Boarding School	Christine	
2021	The Conjuring: The Devil Made Me Do It	Judy Warren	
2023	The Nun II	Judy Warren	Cameo

=== Television ===
Year	Title	Role	Notes
2011	Royal Pains	Gina	Episode: "A Man Called Grandpa"
2013	Deception	Lily Bowers	5 episodes
2016–2019	Divorce	Lila DuFresne	Main role
2020	Almost Family	Olivia	3 Episodes
