= The Grownup =

2014 short story by Gillian Flynn

- First stand-alone edition (US)
- Author: Gillian Flynn
- Original title: What Do You Do?
- Language: English
- Publisher: Crown (US); Weidenfeld & Nicolson (UK)
- Publication date: 2014 (in collection); 3 Nov 2015 (stand-alone)
- Publication place: United States
- Media type: Print
- Pages: 64

The Grownup is a short story by Gillian Flynn, initially published as What Do You Do? in the 2014 anthology Rogues, edited by George R. R. Martin and Gardner Dozois. It won the 2015 Edgar Award for Best Short Story. It was published as a stand-alone book that year by Crown in the US and by Weidenfeld & Nicolson in the UK.

== Plot ==
The narrator, a con artist, previously worked as a sex worker giving handjobs behind an associated fortune-telling establishment called Spiritual Palms. She shifted her focus to fake fortune-telling, psychic reading, and aura reading.

She meets wealthy housewife Susan Burke, who believes that the Victorian house she has recently moved into, Carterhook Manor, is inhabited by a malevolent spirit. Susan has a strained relationship with her disturbed 15-year-old stepson, Miles, while her husband is usually away for business. During her fake cleansing sessions of Carterhook Manor, the narrator feels threatened by Miles. As Susan and the narrator experience more strange events and Miles grows more aggressive, the narrator begins to believe the house is really haunted. She admits to Susan that she cannot provide psychic guidance and the family should get real help.

However, Miles then reveals to the narrator that Susan's husband is a man whom the narrator often serviced at Spiritual Palms. As revenge, Susan has lured the narrator with fake stories and is planning to kill the narrator and Miles, then frame the narrator as the aggressor. Miles asks the narrator to help him flee in her car.

Later, in the car, Miles reveals that he lied: Susan had no idea of her husband's infidelity. Instead, Miles has framed the narrator as a thief and a kidnapper, and threatens to turn her in to the police if she does not comply with his orders. He needs her to help him travel the country as he wishes by posing as his adult guardian. Trapped in the arrangement and suspecting that Miles is a violent sociopath, the narrator begins a cross-country road trip with Miles to a convention for fans of the supernatural.

== Reception ==
Natasha Tripney writing in The Guardian has some reservations: "Flynn plays around with the conventions of the ghost story, albeit in a rather heavy-handed way. Given how slim a thing this is, she squeezes in several wrong turns, but it all feels a bit mechanical. It's her evocation of the main character's grimy life that is, in the end, more intriguing than all the haunted house business."

Other critics were positive, however. Doug Johnstone writes in The Independent, "Flynn handles the throbbing suspense and horror build-up as expertly as ever. As you might expect, there are a couple of big twists and reveals, although this reviewer spotted them coming down the tracks. The problem here, I think, is down to simple length and depth of story. In this shortened, condensed format, it’s harder to embed the background and clues to a twist without the reader noticing, though that doesn’t stop them being a lot of macabre fun when they arrive.'

Katie Law praises the story in Evening Standard: "The good news for Flynnies is that in its way this is another mini-Gone Girl: once again she employs unreliable narrators and re-introduces us to the idea that women can be nastier and more vengeful than men, especially when powered by corrosive sexual jealousy. The con girl may be unpleasant, but she’s the least of it. The bad news is that at just under 80 pages, it’s gone girl too quickly."

It 2016, it was reported that Universal Pictures was adapting the story, with the author and Michael De Luca to produce the film, and Natalie Krinsky to write the screenplay.
