= Gilles Paquet-Brenner =

French film director and screenwriter

- Born: 14 September 1974 (age 50); Paris, France
- Occupation(s): Film director, screenwriter
- Years active: 1998–present

Gilles Paquet-Brenner (born 14 September 1974) is a French director and screenwriter. He is the son of the opera singer Ève Brenner. Paquet-Brenner's first feature film in 2001, Pretty Things, won an award at the Deauville American Film Festival. In 2007, Paquet-Brenner directed the low-budget and direct-to-DVD but generally positively received film, Walled In.

In 2015, he directed the mystery film Dark Places starring Charlize Theron and based on the novel written by Gillian Flynn.

== Filmography ==
Year	Title	Credited as		Notes
Year	Title	Director	Screenwriter	Notes
1998	13 Minutes in the Life of Josh and Anna	Yes		Short film
2000	Le Marquis	Yes		Short film; also as cinematographer
2001	Pretty Things	Yes	Yes	Deauville American Film Festival - Prix Michel d'Ornano
2003	Payoff	Yes	Yes	
2007	U.V.	Yes	Yes	
2007	Gomez vs Tavarès	Yes	Yes	
2007	Walled In	Yes	Yes	
2010	Sarah's Key	Yes	Yes	Tokyo International Film Festival - Best Director; Tokyo International Film Festival - Audience Award
2015	Dark Places	Yes	Yes	
2017	Crooked House	Yes	Yes	
