= Sharp Objects (miniseries) =

2018 American psychological thriller miniseries

- Genre: Psychological thriller; Drama; Mystery; Southern Gothic
- Created by: Marti Noxon
- Based on: Sharp Objects by Gillian Flynn
- Directed by: Jean-Marc Vallée
- Starring: Amy Adams; Patricia Clarkson; Chris Messina; Eliza Scanlen; Matt Craven; Henry Czerny; Taylor John Smith; Madison Davenport; Miguel Sandoval; Will Chase; Jackson Hurst; Sophia Lillis; Lulu Wilson; Elizabeth Perkins
- Opening theme: "Dance and Angela" by Franz Waxman
- Country of origin: United States
- Original language: English
- No. of episodes: 8

Production
- Executive producers: Charles Layton; Marci Wiseman; Jessica Rhoades; Gregg Fienberg; Nathan Ross; Jean-Marc Vallée; Amy Adams; Gillian Flynn; Jason Blum; Marti Noxon
- Producer: David Auge
- Cinematography: Yves Bélanger; Ronald Plante
- Editors: Véronique Barbe; David Berman; Maxime Lahaie; Émile Vallée; Jai M. Vee (Note: Jean-Marc Vallée's pseudonym as an editor.)
- Running time: 55–61 minutes
- Production companies: HBO Entertainment; Crazyrose; Fourth Born; Blumhouse Productions; Tiny Pyro; Entertainment One

Original release
- Network: HBO
- Release: July 8 – August 26, 2018

Sharp Objects is an American Southern Gothic psychological thriller television miniseries based on Gillian Flynn's 2006 debut novel of the same name that premiered on July 8, 2018, on HBO. Created by Marti Noxon and directed by Jean-Marc Vallée, it stars Amy Adams, Patricia Clarkson, Chris Messina, Eliza Scanlen, Matt Craven, Henry Czerny, Taylor John Smith, Madison Davenport, Miguel Sandoval, Will Chase, Jackson Hurst, Sophia Lillis, Lulu Wilson, and Elizabeth Perkins. It follows Camille Preaker (Adams), an emotionally troubled reporter who returns to her hometown to cover the murders of two young girls.

The series received widespread critical acclaim for its visuals, dark atmosphere, directing, and acting (particularly that of Adams and Clarkson). Among its accolades, Clarkson won the Golden Globe Award for Best Supporting Actress – Series, Miniseries or Television Film and Adams received a nomination for the Golden Globe Award for Best Actress – Miniseries or Television Film. It also received eight nominations at the 71st Primetime Emmy Awards, including Outstanding Limited Series and acting nominations for Adams and Clarkson. It is the final directorial work of Vallée before his sudden death in 2021.

== Premise ==
Crime reporter Camille Preaker, suffering from alcoholism and recently discharged from a psychiatric hospital after years of self-harming, returns to her hometown of Wind Gap, Missouri, to investigate the murders of two young girls. Upon arriving at her childhood home, she finds herself once again under the critical eye of her mother, Adora, a small-town socialite, which forces Camille to confront her personal demons.

== Cast and characters ==
=== Main ===
- Amy Adams as Camille Preaker, an alcoholic reporter recently discharged from a psychiatric hospital
  - Sophia Lillis as young Camille Preaker
- Patricia Clarkson as Adora Crellin, Camille and Amma's overbearing socialite mother
- Chris Messina as Detective Richard Willis, a detective from Kansas City who arrives in Wind Gap to assist with the murder investigations
- Eliza Scanlen as Amma Crellin, Camille's half-sister and Adora and Alan's daughter
- Matt Craven as Bill Vickery, the police chief of Wind Gap
- Henry Czerny as Alan Crellin, Camille's stepfather, Adora's husband, and Amma's father
- Taylor John Smith as John Keene, the brother of Wind Gap's second murder victim, Natalie Keene
- Madison Davenport as Ashley Wheeler, John's girlfriend
- Miguel Sandoval as Frank Curry, the editor of the St. Louis Chronicle who sends Camille back to Wind Gap on the assignment that leads her to confront her "issues"
- Will Chase as Bob Nash, the father of Wind Gap's first murder victim, Ann Nash
- Jackson Hurst as Kirk Lacey, a teacher at Wind Gap Middle School
- Lulu Wilson as Marian Crellin, Camille's half-sister who died in front of her when they were children, Adora and Alan's first child together, and Amma's sister
- Elizabeth Perkins as Jackie O'Neill, the town gossip and longtime family friend of the Crellins

=== Recurring ===
- David Sullivan as Chris, the owner of the bar where Camille frequently goes to in Wind Gap and an old friend of hers
- Violet Brinson as Kelsey
- April Brinson as Jodes
- Barbara Eve Harris as Eileen, Frank Curry's wife and friend of Camille
- Emily Yancy as Gayla, Adora's and Alan's housekeeper
- Sydney Sweeney as Alice, Camille's teenage roommate at the psychiatric hospital
- Jessica Treska as Natalie Keene
- Beth Broderick as Annie B
- Catherine Carlen as Deeanna
- Loretta Fox as Melissa
- Aaron Holliday as Damon
- London Vanovan as Amanda Nash
- Ryan James Nelson as Nolan
- Jennifer Aspen as Jeannie Keene, the mother of John and Natalie Keene
- D. B. Sweeney as Mr. Keene, father of John and Natalie Keene
- Randy Oglesby as Pastor
- Betsy Baker as Jocelyn Vickery
- Cody Sullivan as Nathan
- Evan Castelloe as Teen Kirk Lacey
- Gunnar Koehler as Bobby Nash
- Gracie Prewitt as Tiffanie Nash
- Daisy Garcia as Bar Waitress
- Reagan Pasternak as Katie Lacey
- Lauran September as Angie
- Jean Villepique as Gretchen
- Ericka Kreutz as Lisa
- Guy Boyd as Clyde
- Sonny Shah as Cashier
- Kaegan Baron as Ann Nash

== Episodes ==
No.	Title	Directed by	Written by	Original release date	U.S. viewers (millions)
1	"Vanish"	Jean-Marc Vallée	Marti Noxon	July 8, 2018	1.54
Camille Preaker, a St. Louis-based reporter, is struggling with alcoholism and self-harm. She has flashbacks to her troubled childhood in the small town of Wind Gap, Missouri. Her editor, Frank Curry, orders her to return to Wind Gap, where a 13-year-old girl, Ann Nash, was murdered the previous summer, and another, 14-year-old Natalie Keene, is missing. Camille's flashbacks intensify when she returns, and after a couple days, she goes to live with her socialite mother Adora Crellin, stepfather Alan, and teenaged half-sister Amma. She meets Detective Richard Willis during a search party. She then talks with Bob Nash about the disappearance of his daughter. Later that day Natalie Keene's body is discovered in the alley behind the police station. Amma and Camille talk about their middle sister Marian, who had died when Camille was younger, and Amma secretly admits to disliking her mother's treatment of her and behaves like a child to hide her rebellious side. During a bath, it is revealed that not only has Camille carved the word "vanish" into her arm, but she has words carved all over her body.
2	"Dirt"	Jean-Marc Vallée	Gillian Flynn	July 15, 2018	1.10
Richard wonders why Ann was found in the woods on the spot where she was killed, yet Natalie was discovered posed in the middle of town with all of her teeth yanked out, seemingly with pliers. Camille sees Richard taking soil samples from Bob Nash's tires. Adora, who has kept Marian's room like a shrine, continues to belittle Camille, whom she accuses of embarrassing the family through her investigation. Camille thinks Natalie's older brother, high school senior John, stands out in Wind Gap, and is told by neighborhood kids that the "woman in white", a local legend, took Natalie. Police Chief Bill Vickery implies that the boy who saw this is "trash" and can't be trusted. Camille says they used to scare each other with stories about the Woman in White abducting children, but Vickery and Richard insist that Natalie and Ann were murdered by a man. Adora accuses Camille of being drunk at Natalie's funeral and says that Natalie reminded her of Camille when she was young, and that she tried to help Natalie.
3	"Fix"	Jean-Marc Vallée	Alex Metcalf	July 22, 2018	1.03
After a party, a drunk Amma crashes a golf cart into her mother's rosebushes. Camille flashes back to her recent stay in a psychiatric facility, where she shared a room with a young woman named Alice. They become friends listening to Alice’s music, but Alice dies by suicide after drinking drain cleaner and a devastated Camille slashes her own wrists. In the present, Camille interviews Bob Nash, who thinks John Keene was involved. Vickery calls Adora, who arrives and reprimands Camille while comforting Bob. Later, John Keene accuses Bob Nash of being involved. John's girlfriend, Ashley Wheeler, is one of the few people friendly to Camille. After a conversation between Adora and Vickery, Adora warns Amma about Camille and that she is dangerous. Richard is frustrated by lack of cooperation from the public in Wind Gap and by Vickery belittling his belief that the murderer is from within the town. He tells Camille to stay out of his way. It is revealed that Adora also knew Ann and tutored her.
4	"Ripe"	Jean-Marc Vallée	Vince Calandra	July 29, 2018	0.93
Camille attends a luncheon with Jackie and her other friends, where they discuss Bob Nash and John Keene. Afterwards, she shows Richard around old crime scenes in Wind Gap before taking him to a hunting shed in the woods where high school jocks have sex with cheerleaders. A flashback shows Camille as a cheerleader being chased by a group of boys before seemingly being raped. In the present, Camille and Richard have a sexual encounter in the woods. John Keene is fired from his job at Adora's hog factory. For Calhoun Day, a local holiday celebrating a Confederate victory during the Civil War, Amma practices for a ceremonial play and flirts with her teacher. Alan tells Adora he feels under-appreciated. Camille learns from John Keene that Amma was once friends with Ann and Natalie. She has a disturbing vision of Amma dead in the hunting shed.
5	"Closer"	Jean-Marc Vallée	Scott Brown	August 5, 2018	1.17
Workers begin setting up Adora’s backyard for the Calhoun Day celebrations as Amma discovers Camille's article about the murders. Angry, Amma steals Camille's clothes in the dressing room of a shop, forcing Camille to reveal her scars, which her mother claims she self-inflicted out of spite. During Calhoun Day, Richard notices Bob Nash drinking at the party while Ashley confronts Camille for not including her in the article. Adora notices Camille talking with Richard, and warns him that Camille is dangerous. During the play, a fight breaks out between Bob and John. Frightened and high, Amma flees into the woods, and a search party goes out after her. Camille finds her injured in the shed and brings her home. Later that night, Adora tells Camille that she never loved her. A distraught Camille goes to Richard's motel and has sex with him, in the dark and fully clothed.
6	"Cherry"	Jean-Marc Vallée	Dawn Kamoche & Ariella Blejer	August 12, 2018	1.13
Alan blames Camille for her mother's illness and threatens to kick her out. Flashbacks show Camille as a cheerleader back in high school, during which her friends make nasty remarks about her period; Becca helps her and notices the word "cherry" carved on her thigh. In present day, Camille joins her old friends for brunch, and reconnects with Becca. Richard digs into Camille's and Marion’s past, looking into their medical history. Camille runs into Amma and her friends, who invite her to a party. There, John and Ashley show up, but leave when Amma and her friends drunkenly abuse them. Amma convinces Camille to take oxycontin and ecstasy and the two of them roller skate through Wind Gap. The two return home and Amma begs to go with Camille to St. Louis. Amma and Camille pass out in Camille's bedroom.
7	"Falling"	Jean-Marc Vallée	Gillian Flynn & Scott Brown	August 19, 2018	1.25
Camille wakes up to find herself in bed and being treated by Adora. Meanwhile, Richard continues his investigation of Marian Crellin, meeting a nurse who suspected Adora of Munchausen syndrome by proxy. Adora gives a home-made cocktail of drugs to Amma for her hangover, causing her to fall ill. As the police search for him, Camille discovers John Keene at a bar where the two talk before leaving for a motel room. Camille allows him to see her scars, and they have intimate sex. Soon afterward, the police arrive to arrest John, and Richard berates Camille after seeing her in bed with John. Camille learns of her mother's suspected condition from Jackie, and that Marian's body was cremated. Camille breaks down in tears in her car while calling Curry, who pleads for her to return home to St. Louis; Camille instead decides to confront her mother.
8	"Milk"	Jean-Marc Vallée	Marti Noxon & Gillian Flynn	August 26, 2018	1.76
Camille returns home to find her family seated for dinner. She pretends to be sick to divert Adora's attention away from Amma. Adora poisons Camille to the point of near-death. After being turned away by Alan, Richard comes back with Curry and Chief Vickery and arrests Adora for poisoning her daughters. In the house, Richard finds bloody pliers that match the murders of Ann Nash and Natalie Keene. While Camille is recovering at the hospital, Richard tells her that her mother fed them rat poison, with Amma building a tolerance over the years; he apologizes before leaving. Adora is convicted for all the murders and the poisoning, while Amma moves with Camille to St. Louis. There, she befriends a neighbor girl named Mae, who makes a good impression on Camille and Curry. While Amma is out with Mae, Camille discovers that the floor of a room in Amma’s dollhouse is actually made of human teeth, resembling the ivory floor of a room of their Wind Gap family home, implying that Amma is the murderer. In a mid-credits scene, Amma is shown strangling Mae, alongside flashbacks of brutally killing Ann with the help of her friends, and attacking Natalie in John’s bedroom where her blood was found. In a post-credits scene, it is revealed that the "woman in white" was Amma.

== Production ==
=== Development ===
In 2008, it was reported that an adaptation of Gillian Flynn's debut novel, Sharp Objects, was in development by French production company Pathé with Andrea Arnold set to direct. By 2012, it was reported that the novel had been optioned by Alliance Films with Jason Blum expected to serve as a producer. Subsequently, Marti Noxon approached Blum with her vision for an eight episode television series.

On July 8, 2014, it was announced that Blumhouse Productions and Entertainment One would be developing and producing a drama based on the novel. Marti Noxon would serve as the showrunner, writer and executive producer, while Jean-Marc Vallée would serve as the director and executive producer.

On April 1, 2016, it was announced that HBO had given the production an eight episode straight-to-series order. On May 15, 2018, it was announced that the series would premiere on July 8, 2018. On July 25, 2018, HBO president of programming, Casey Bloys, confirmed that, unlike another HBO series, Big Little Lies, which was originally ordered as a limited series before being renewed for a second season, Sharp Objects will not return for more episodes following its limited run.

=== Casting ===
On February 19, 2016, Variety reported that Amy Adams had joined the project as its lead. In March 2017, it was announced that Patricia Clarkson, Eliza Scanlen, Elizabeth Perkins, Madison Davenport, Chris Messina, Matt Craven, and Taylor John Smith had been cast in series regular roles. It was also announced that Will Chase, Jackson Hurst, and Jennifer Aspen had joined the cast in a recurring capacity. On May 22, 2017, it was announced that David Sullivan, Reagan Pasternak, Sydney Sweeney, Hilary Ward, and Sophia Lillis had been cast in recurring roles.

=== Filming ===
Principal photography for the series commenced on March 6, 2017. Filming locations included Barnesville, Georgia; Los Angeles, California; Redwood Valley, California; Santa Clarita, California; and Mendocino, California.

It was reported that there was a fair amount of turmoil on the set of the series. Showrunner Noxon described the alleged "toe-to-toe screaming matches" she and the other producers would get into with director Vallée over his refusal to adhere closely to the series' scripts. Noxon has described Vallée as "much more interested in imagery and telling stories through pictures, and he's brilliant at that...but I love language...I studied theatre at Wesleyan before I became a writer, and the beauty of language, particularly in the Southern Gothic tradition, is so important to me." Noxon together with Gillian Flynn, Jessica Rhoades, Amy Adams, and another (male) producer would reportedly have to pressure Vallée to include the dialogue of the script in his scenes, to his displeasure.

=== Music ===
Each episode features a title sequence with a different interpretation of the song "Dance and Angela" by Franz Waxman from the score of the 1951 film A Place in the Sun. An electronic treatment of the song, by Jeffrey Brodsky, was used for the second episode. All music featured in the series is diegetic, coming from a source (a stereo, headphones, etc.) within the scene. The series secured the rights to four songs by Led Zeppelin, a band for which it is notoriously hard to obtain rights. Music supervisor Susan Jacobs stated, "We were trying to explain the importance of what music really does and how it plays a really pivotal role in this girl's life" and "also the escapism idea of music." The band liked the idea and approved the usage of their music.

Promotional poster featuring Camille Preaker (Amy Adams), Amma Crellin (Eliza Scanlen), and Adora Crellin (Patricia Clarkson).

== Release ==
=== Marketing ===
On April 22, 2018, a teaser trailer for the series was released. On June 5, 2018, the official trailer was released.

=== Premiere ===
On June 7, 2018, the series held its world premiere during the opening night screening at the annual ATX Television Festival in Austin, Texas. Following the premiere, a question-and-answer panel took place featuring Amy Adams, Marti Noxon, Gillian Flynn, Jean-Marc Vallée, and Jason Blum.

=== Home media ===
Sharp Objects was released on Blu-ray and DVD on November 27, 2018.

== Reception ==
=== Critical response ===
Sharp Objects received critical acclaim. On review aggregator Rotten Tomatoes, the series has an approval rating of 92% based on 289 reviews, with an average rating of 8.15/10. The website's critics consensus reads: "A nearly unbearable slow burn, Sharp Objects maintains its grip with an unshakably grim atmosphere and an outstanding cast led by a superb Amy Adams." On Metacritic, it has a weighted average score of 78 out of 100, based on 41 critics, indicating "generally favorable reviews".

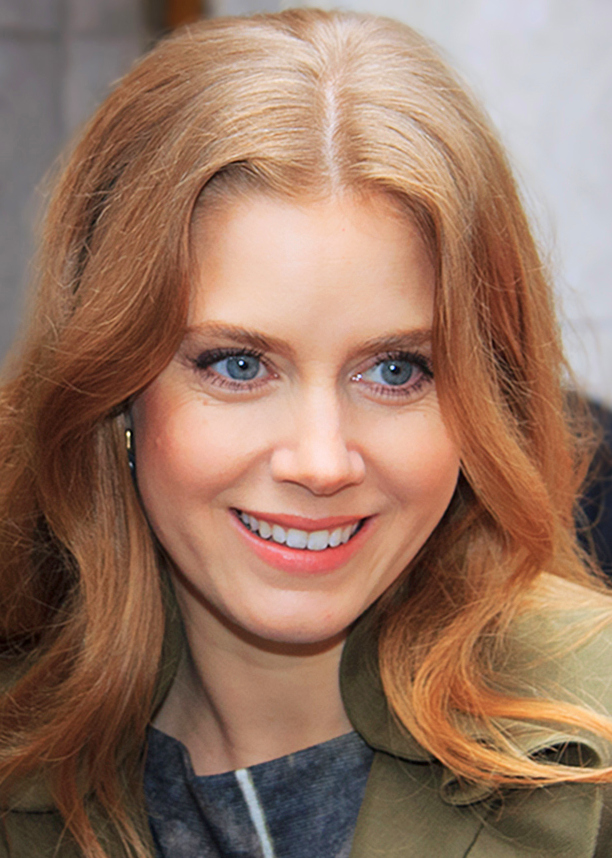
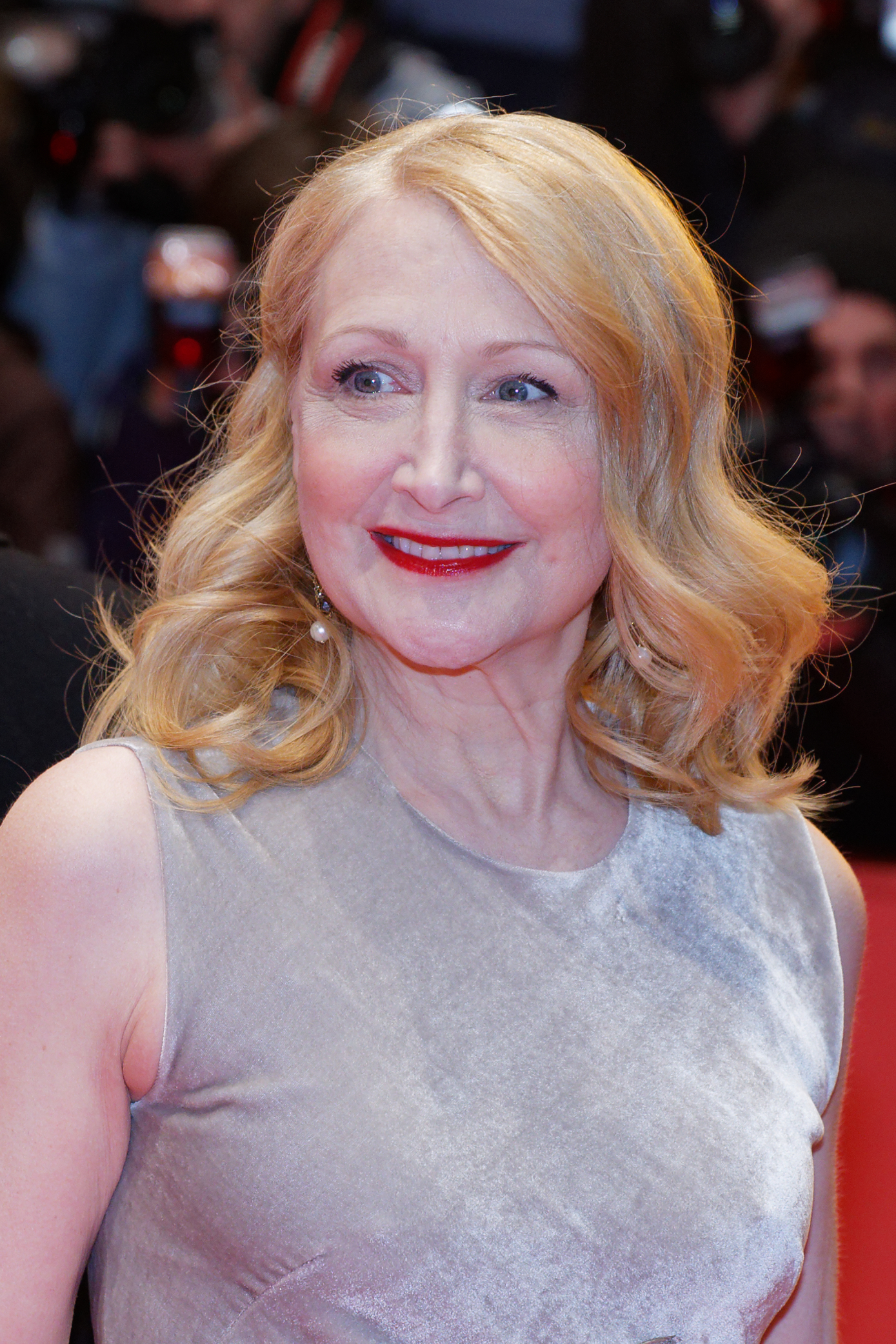
Amy Adams and Patricia Clarkson's performances garnered widespread critical acclaim and earned them Primetime Emmy Award nominations for Outstanding Lead Actress and Outstanding Supporting Actress in a Limited Series or Movie, respectively.

In a positive review, the Chicago Sun Times's Richard Roeper awarded the series four stars and praised it saying, "Graced with some of the best performances Amy Adams and Patricia Clarkson have ever given, directed with sure-handed and sometimes flamboyant style by Jean-Marc Vallee and dripping with honey-coated but often barbed dialogue, Sharp Objects is flat-out great television. In another encouraging criticism, The Hollywood Reporter's Daniel Fienberg was similarly complimentary saying, "On TV, Sharp Objects can't precisely capture Flynn's prose and the internalized descent into disorientation taken page-by-page, but series director Jean-Marc Vallee finds his own visual language that, driven by a ferociously wounded performance by Amy Adams, makes this eight-hour limited series haunting and riveting — both prestige and pulp." In a further approving editorial, The New York Times's James Poniewozik described the series as "mesmerizing" and commended it saying, "There's no cat-and-mouse game going on, no taunts from a genius criminal. Sharp Objects instead relies on internal drama and a transfixing Ms. Adams, who lays Camille’s ragged soul bare with sardonicism and self-loathing."

In a more mixed assessment, USA Today's Kelly Lawler gave the series a rating of two stars out of four and said, "Although the eight-episode series eventually perks up, in the seven parts made available for review it's often a lazy, dreary summer mystery that feels exploitative of the violence it depicts. It's a disappointing adaptation of its source material, with all the gravitas of a trashy beach read." In a further ambivalent editorial, TVLine's Dave Nemetz gave the series a "B−" grade and said, "There's enough intriguing material in Sharp Objects to keep me watching until the end; at the very least, it’s still an artfully shot showcase for some fine acting, which isn’t the worst thing in the world. But considering the big names involved and the promising source material, it can’t help but feel like a letdown."

=== Ratings ===
Viewership and ratings per episode of Sharp Objects
No.	Title	Air date	Rating (18–49)	Viewers (millions)	DVR (18–49)	DVR viewers (millions)	Total (18–49)	Total viewers (millions)
1	"Vanish"	July 8, 2018	0.5	1.54	0.1	0.59	0.6	2.13 (Note: Live +7 ratings were not available, so Live +3 ratings have been used instead.)
2	"Dirt"	July 15, 2018	0.3	1.10	—N/a	0.74	—N/a	1.84
3	"Fix"	July 22, 2018	0.3	1.03	—N/a	0.79	—N/a	1.82
4	"Ripe"	July 29, 2018	0.2	0.93	0.3	—N/a	0.5	—N/a
5	"Closer"	August 5, 2018	0.4	1.17	0.1	0.62	0.5	1.79
6	"Cherry"	August 12, 2018	0.3	1.13	0.2	0.57	0.5	1.70
7	"Falling"	August 19, 2018	0.4	1.25	0.3	0.94	0.7	2.19
8	"Milk"	August 26, 2018	0.5	1.76	0.2	0.71	0.7	2.47

=== Accolades ===
Year	Award	Category	Nominee(s)	Result	Ref.
2018	California on Location Awards	Location Manager of the Year – One Hour Television	Gregory Alpert	Won	
2019	American Cinema Editors Awards	Best Edited Miniseries or Motion Picture for Television	Véronique Barbe, Dominique Champagne, Justin Lachance, Maxime Lahaie, Émile Vallée, and Jai M. Vee (for "Milk")	Nominated	
2019	Art Directors Guild Awards	Excellence in Production Design for a Television Movie or Limited Series	John Paino, Austin Gorg, Wes Hottman, Jason Perrine, Tom Taylor, Steven Light-Orr, Amy Wells, and Joanna Bush (for "Vanish", "Closer", and "Milk")	Nominated	
2019	Banff World Media Festival	Grand Jury Prize		Won	
2019	Banff World Media Festival	Best Limited Series		Won	
2019	Blogos de Oro	Best Actress in a Series	Amy Adams	Won	
2019	Canadian Cinema Editors Awards	Best Editing in TV Drama	Justin Lachance, Véronique Barbe, Dominique Champagne, Maxime Lahaie, Émile Vallée, and Jai M. Vee (for "Milk")	Nominated	
2019	Costume Designers Guild Awards	Excellence in Contemporary Television	Alix Friedberg	Nominated	
2019	Critics' Choice Television Awards	Best Movie/Miniseries		Nominated	
2019	Critics' Choice Television Awards	Best Actress in a Movie/Miniseries	Amy Adams	Won (Note: Tied with Patricia Arquette for Escape at Dannemora.)	
2019	Critics' Choice Television Awards	Best Supporting Actress in a Movie/Miniseries	Patricia Clarkson	Won	
2019	Critics' Choice Television Awards	Best Supporting Actress in a Movie/Miniseries	Elizabeth Perkins	Nominated	
2019	Directors Guild of America Awards	Outstanding Directorial Achievement in Movies for Television and Limited Series	Jean-Marc Vallée	Nominated	
2019	Dorian Awards	TV Performance of the Year — Actress	Amy Adams	Nominated	
2019	Globe de Cristal Awards	Best Foreign Series / Mini-Series		Won	
2019	Golden Globe Awards	Best Limited/Anthology Series or TV Film		Nominated	
2019	Golden Globe Awards	Best Actress – Miniseries or TV Film	Amy Adams	Nominated	
2019	Golden Globe Awards	Best Supporting Actress – Television	Patricia Clarkson	Won	
2019	Golden Trailer Awards	Best Drama/Action Poster for a TV/Streaming Series		Nominated	
2019	Gotham Independent Film Awards	Breakthrough Series – Long Form		Nominated	
2019	Guild of Music Supervisors Awards	Best Music Supervision – Television Movie	Susan Jacobs	Won (Note: Tied with Lindsay Wolfington and Laura Webb for To All the Boys I've Loved Before.)	
2019	Primetime Emmy Awards	Outstanding Limited or Anthology Series	Marti Noxon, Jason Blum, Gillian Flynn, Amy Adams, Jean-Marc Vallée, Nathan Ross, Gregg Fienberg, Jessica Rhoades, Marci Wiseman, Jeremy Gold, Vince Calandra, and David Auge	Nominated	
2019	Primetime Emmy Awards	Outstanding Lead Actress in a Limited/Anthology Series or Movie	Amy Adams	Nominated	
2019	Primetime Emmy Awards	Outstanding Supporting Actress in a Limited/Anthology Series or Movie	Patricia Clarkson	Nominated	
2019	Primetime Creative Arts Emmy Awards	Outstanding Casting for a Limited/Anthology Series or Movie	David Rubin	Nominated	
2019	Primetime Creative Arts Emmy Awards	Outstanding Contemporary Costumes	Alix Friedberg and Shawn Barry (for "Closer")	Nominated	
2019	Primetime Creative Arts Emmy Awards	Outstanding Hairstyling for a Limited/Anthology Series or Movie	Jose Zamora, Michelle Ceglia, Jocelyn Mulhern, Patti Dehaney, Melissa Yonkey, and Stacey K. Black (for "Closer")	Nominated	
2019	Primetime Creative Arts Emmy Awards	Outstanding Makeup (Non-Prosthetic)	Michelle Radow, Eric Rosenmann, Kate Biscoe, and Karen Rentrop	Nominated	
2019	Primetime Creative Arts Emmy Awards	Outstanding Single-Camera Picture Editing for a Limited/Anthology Series or Movie	Véronique Barbe, Justin Lachance, Maxime Lahaie, Émile Vallée, and Jai M. Vee (for "Fix")	Nominated	
2019	Producers Guild of America Awards	David L. Wolper Award for Outstanding Producer of Long-Form Television	Marti Noxon, Jason Blum, Gillian Flynn, Amy Adams, Jean-Marc Vallée, Nathan Ross, Gregg Fienberg, Jessica Rhoades, Vince Calandra, and David Auge	Nominated	
2019	Satellite Awards	Best Miniseries		Nominated	
2019	Satellite Awards	Best Actress in a Miniseries or a Motion Picture Made for Television	Amy Adams	Won	
2019	Screen Actors Guild Awards	Outstanding Performance by a Female Actor in a Miniseries or Television Movie	Amy Adams	Nominated	
2019	Screen Actors Guild Awards	Outstanding Performance by a Female Actor in a Miniseries or Television Movie	Patricia Clarkson	Nominated	
2019	Television Critics Association Awards	Outstanding Achievement in Movies, Miniseries and Specials		Nominated	
2019	Television Critics Association Awards	Individual Achievement in Drama	Amy Adams	Nominated	
2019	USC Scripter Awards	Television	Marti Noxon (for "Vanish"); Based on the novel by Gillian Flynn	Nominated	
2019	Writers Guild of America Awards	Long Form – Adapted	Ariella Blejer, Scott Brown, Vince Calandra, Gillian Flynn, Dawn Kamoche, Alex Metcalf, and Marti Noxon; Based on the novel by Gillian Flynn	Nominated	
2020	Artios Awards	Outstanding Achievement in Casting – Limited Series	David Rubin, Chase Paris, Tara Feldstein Bennett, and Andrea Bunker	Nominated	

== See also ==
- List of Primetime Emmy Awards received by HBO
