= Gone Girl (novel) =

2012 novel by Gillian Flynn

- Front cover
- Author: Gillian Flynn
- Audio read by: Julia Whelan; Kirby Heyborne
- Language: English
- Genre: Thriller
- Publisher: Crown Publishing Group
- Publication date: June 5, 2012
- Publication place: United States
- Pages: 432 (first edition)
- ISBN: 978-0307588364

Gone Girl is a psychological thriller novel by American writer Gillian Flynn, published by Crown Publishing Group on June 5, 2012. The book became popular, making the New York Times Best Seller list.

The sense of suspense in the novel comes from whether Nick Dunne is responsible for the disappearance of his wife Amy. Critics acclaimed the book for its use of unreliable narration, plot twists, and suspense.

A film adaptation, with a screenplay by Flynn herself, was released on October 3, 2014. Directed by David Fincher, with Ben Affleck and Rosamund Pike in lead roles, the film achieved both commercial success and critical acclaim.

== Plot summary ==
=== Part 1 ===
The narrative alternates between the point of view of Nick and Amy Dunne (née Elliott). Nick's narration begins shortly after arriving home on his fifth wedding anniversary to find Amy is missing from their home; there are signs of a struggle. Amy's narration comes in the form of her diaries and follows the earlier stages of their relationship.

The diary entries describe how Amy met Nick in New York City, where they both worked as writers. Nick was a journalist who wrote movie and TV reviews, while Amy wrote personality quizzes for women's magazines. After two years of dating, they married. The couple lived in a beautiful brownstone home in Brooklyn where they were happy.

In 2009, both Nick and Amy lost their jobs following the Great Recession. Amy's parents Rand and Marybeth, meanwhile, had written a successful children's book series called "Amazing Amy," based on Amy's life experiences. However, when sales from the books declined and Rand and Marybeth didn't curb their spending, they also started facing financial issues. Their solution was to ask Amy for money from her trust fund, which made Nick unhappy.

Eventually, Amy and Nick relocate to Nick's hometown of North Carthage, Missouri, to care for Nick's sick mother, Maureen. With permission, Nick uses what remains of Amy's trust fund to open a bar with his twin sister, Margo or "Go". Nick also finds work teaching journalism at a local college. Their marriage deteriorates; Amy describes how she hates being a housewife in the suburbs and resents Nick for making her move. Her diary comes to portray Nick as an aggressive, moody, idle, and threatening husband, and indicates that she fears for her life.

In Nick's narrative, he views Amy as a needlessly difficult, antisocial, controlling perfectionist, and an unwelcome obligation, but he is concerned about her disappearance. Nick becomes a suspect in the investigation, led by Detectives Rhonda Boney and Jim Gilpin, and Nick downplays their relationship issues. During the investigation, Nick faces intense media scrutiny, exacerbated by his lack of obvious emotion and apparent flippant attitude. It is also revealed by Amy's supposed best friend from the neighborhood, Noelle Hawthorne, that Amy was pregnant, which Nick was unaware of. Nick has serious credit card debt, which he claims to have been unaware of, and Amy's life insurance was recently increased by Nick, which he claims was her idea. It becomes apparent to Nick that his wife had hidden secrets from him.

=== Part 2 ===
It is revealed that Nick and Amy are unreliable narrators. Nick has admitted that he is cheating on his wife with Andie, his former college student, and intended to divorce Amy; he hid this from investigators to avoid suspicion. Amy's narration shifts to the present day, revealing that she is alive and staged her own disappearance to go into hiding. After discovering Nick's affair, she became angry at his disregard for her and planned extensively for a year to fake her death and frame Nick as revenge for wasting her life. Her pregnancy, years of diary entries, and other evidence were fabricated in order to incriminate Nick.

Nick becomes aware of Amy's plan based on vague clues that she has left under the guise of their traditional anniversary treasure hunt. He is led to Go's woodshed where he discovers exorbitant purchases that Amy made with credit cards in his name to further incriminate him. The shed also contains Amy's anniversary gift of Punch and Judy puppets (one missing a handle), indicating that she expects Nick to receive the death penalty for her murder.

Amy's plan to monitor the investigation through the news media is foiled when she is robbed at the motel where she has holed up. Desperate, she seeks help from her wealthy ex-boyfriend, Desi Collings, with whom she had a manipulative relationship in her youth. Desi, still enamored, hides her in his lake house but becomes possessive and controlling, making Amy feel trapped.

Nick and his new lawyer, Tanner Bolt, work to change public perception of Nick through an interview with a popular talk show host, during which Nick pretends to be apologetic about his infidelity and failings as a husband. He is well-received, but the police have discovered the woodshed. Amy's faked diary chronicling abuse from Nick is also found in his father's old house. The police find the missing handle from the puppets, bearing Amy's blood. Nick is arrested.

At Desi's house, Amy sees the TV interview and is impressed by Nick's performance of a perfect husband, and is convinced that the two of them uniquely understand and are matched to each other. She mutilates her own body so that it appears Desi has been holding her captive, then seduces him and murders him.

=== Part 3 ===
Amy returns to North Carthage, where Nick is recently out on bond. She fabricates a story for investigators that she was kidnapped from home and imprisoned by Desi before killing him to escape; her diary entries were melodramatic and she is glad to be back with Nick. Nick, Detective Boney, and Go know she is lying but have no proof. Nick is forced to return to married life with Amy as the media storm dies down.

Amy begins writing her memoir of the fabricated events, and Nick privately begins writing an exposé of Amy's deceptions. Amy uses Nick's semen, which they had saved at a fertility clinic, to inseminate herself, and forces him to delete his book by threatening to keep him from their unborn child. Nick complies, dedicating himself to the role of a perfect husband. On the eve of Amy's due date, Nick momentarily drops the act and reveals the pity he feels for Amy, deeply unsettling her.

== Characters ==
- Amy Elliott Dunne: The title character, who vanishes from her home at the start of the novel. She was the source of inspiration for her psychologist parents' "Amazing Amy" children's book series, and she enjoyed a wealthy childhood. She made a living in New York as a writer of personality quizzes. She is intelligent, beautiful, charming, strategic, and has a history of manipulating and incriminating those around her and posing herself as a victim. She places great importance in the appearance and perception of things, and knows how to manipulate others using this. After they moved to Missouri, Amy began resenting Nick and her isolated, reduced, lifestyle. Upon realizing that Nick was being unfaithful, Amy was enraged at his disregard for the effort she had made to become the perfect "cool girl" wife he wanted to keep him happy in their relationship. Amy feels that he wasted her life and wants to walk away consequence free after taking advantage of Amy and not holding up his side of the bargain. Amy then spent a year developing a complex revenge plan to frame him for her murder. She planned to wait until Nick was found guilty before drowning herself in the Gulf of Mexico, so it would appear her body floated down the Mississippi River. After seeing on TV that Nick acknowledges his wrongdoing and that he is aware of what she has done, Amy decides that he is capable of acting as the perfect husband for her in return, and wants to return to their marriage. She kills Desi Collings, her old boyfriend, in order to return home and convince the public that she was kidnapped and raped by Desi. Amy ultimately blackmails Nick into staying with her by inseminating herself with his sperm, and is satisfied to maintain their image as a perfect couple.
- Lance Nicholas ("Nick") Dunne: Raised in a working-class household with a verbally abusive father, a mother who eventually divorced his father, and a twin sister, Margo, with whom he is close. Nick worries about the influence his misogynistic father has had on his personality, and is very concerned with being likable. He worked as a journalist after moving to New York City. He and Amy returned to his hometown, where he became increasingly distant from Amy and depressed from the stress of his mother's cancer and father's Alzheimer's disease. Amy gave him money to open "The Bar" with his twin sister. All of these hardships and responsibilities cause Nick to grow lazy and check out of his marriage. He became apathetic with Amy and had an affair with one of his students, Andie. Nick's lack of reciprocal effort to please Amy in their marriage enrages her. After Amy's disappearance, Nick realizes her plan to frame him, and grasps the extent of her sociopathy. He manipulates her into coming home by saying what he knows she wants to hear during television interviews. When Amy returns, Nick tried to convince her to divorce him, but she refuses, requiring him to maintain the image of their healed marriage and permanently keep up efforts to appear as the perfect husband. He ultimately resigns to stay with her after she threatens to make his child hate him or falsely accuse him of abuse.
- Jim Gilpin: A detective who participated in Nick's investigation. He is described by Nick as having "fleshy bags under his eyes" and "scraggly white whiskers in his mustache."
- Rhonda Boney: A detective who participated in Nick's investigation. She has a younger brother whom she "dotes on," and is the mother of a teenaged daughter, Mia. She is described by Nick as "ugly," although he says he has an "affinity" for "ugly women." She does not want to believe Nick is really guilty despite the seeming evidence piling on the case and gives him the benefit of the doubt until things really take a turn for the worse. When Amy returns, Nick tells Boney about Amy's confession but nobody is able to find enough evidence against her.
- Tanner Bolt: Nick's lawyer, a defense attorney who specializes in defending husbands accused of murdering their spouses.
- Betsy Bolt: Tanner's wife who helps condition Nick to perform better during media interviews. Her main way of conditioning him is by throwing jelly beans at him when he seems stiff and unnatural.
- Andie Hardy: A woman in her early 20s, who has a sexual dalliance with Nick. Andie met Nick as a student in his magazine-writing class and their affair began 15 months before Amy's disappearance. She appears genuinely in love with Nick and becomes resentful when he abandons her due to Amy's disappearance, as the affair would make him appear obviously suspect. Andie tells the story of their affair at a press conference at the same time that Nick confesses to his infidelity during a separate interview.
- Margo ("Go") Dunne: Nick's twin sister, with whom he owns a bar and has a close relationship. She remains loyal to Nick throughout the murder investigation, despite her suspicions.
- Hilary Handy: Amy's former friend and "Sidekick Suzy" during freshman year of high school. She was accused of pushing Amy down a flight of stairs.
- Tommy O'Hara: A humor columnist that casually dated Amy seven years ago. He shares his side of the story to Nick about Amy's rape charge against him.
- Desi Collings: Amy's boyfriend in high school, who is wealthy and was obsessed with Amy. In their youth, she manipulated her parents into thinking that he was stalking her and overdosed in her bedroom, but has privately stayed in touch with him for years. When Amy is robbed of all her money, she reaches out to Desi for financial help and manipulates him into falling in love with her by using his pompous nature against him. However, rather than giving her money, he brings her to a summer home where he does not give her keys or security codes; there is evidence that he had been previously planning or waiting for her to move in. Desi is not as easy to manipulate nor as generously in love with her as hoped and controls Amy's diet and exercise to return her to the polished appearance he prefers, while requiring her to indulge his petty savior complex fantasies. Amy quickly grows resentful of his controlling disguised as caring behavior. Her last night at Desi's house, she seduces him, puts sleeping pills in his cocktail, and kills him. She later revealed that she had been abusing herself with a wine bottle and tying twine around her wrists to leave marks in order to make it look like Desi kidnapped and raped her. Desi's mother remained convinced of his innocence, but nobody is able to find evidence of Amy's guilt.
- Jeff: Amy's neighbor in Ozark that she meets first. She describes him as a nice guy who keeps odd hours and returns with a lot of fish. She later discovers that he resells stolen fish.
- Greta: Ozark resident that moved in after Amy to get away from an abusive relationship. Amy describes Greta, Jeff and herself as an odd crew in a strange place that have become fast friends. This is short lived and she attacks Amy while Jeff stands in the back. They both call her bluff about calling the cops and take off with all her money.

== Themes and interpretations ==
A main theme of the novel is dishonesty and the superficial nature of appearance, particularly within marriage and romantic relationships. The characters lie to each other and to the reader about affairs and disappearances. Amy fabricates a fake diary to implicate her husband for her disappearance and murder. Flynn says that, in writing the book, she wanted to examine how people within a marriage lie to each other: "Marriage is sort of like a long con, because you put on display your very best self during courtship, yet at the same time the person you marry is supposed to love you warts and all. But your spouse never sees those warts really until you get deeper into the marriage and let yourself unwind a bit."

Reviewers noted the novel's portrayal of the effects of media representation and the blood thirst of the news industry. Nick seems guilty due to media coverage before a trial occurs. Salon.com notes that "Flynn, a former staff writer for Entertainment Weekly, is especially good on the infiltration of the media into every aspect of the missing-person investigation, from Nick's cop-show-based awareness that the husband is always the primary suspect to a raving tabloid-TV Fury, who is out to avenge all wronged women and obviously patterned on Nancy Grace." Entertainment writer Jeff Giles notes that the novel plays on reader expectations that the husband will be the murderer, expectations that have been shaped by the media: "The first half of Gone Girl is a nimble, caustic riff on our Nancy Grace culture and the way in which 'The butler did it' has morphed into 'The husband did it.'" A New York Daily News review notes the novel's interest in how quickly a husband can be convicted in the media: "In a media society informed by Nancy Grace, when a wife goes missing, the husband murdered her. There's no need for a body to arrive at a verdict." A San Francisco Chronicle review notes the book's recurring commentary on media influence: "Flynn pokes smart fun at cable news, our collective obsession with social media and reality TV."

Characters in the novel are strongly affected by the Great Recession and the troubled economy. Flynn said that she wanted this novel to capture the sense of bankruptcy that both individuals and communities feel when the economy spirals. Not only have both her main characters lost their jobs, they have also moved to a town that is blighted by unsold houses and failed businesses. "I wanted the whole thing to feel bankrupt ... I wanted it to really feel like a marriage that had been hollowed out in a city that had been hollowed out and a country that was increasingly hollowed out," said Flynn.

An underlying theme is feminism, most notably represented in Amy's "Cool Girl" speech. Despite her otherwise villainous character, this monologue has been praised for articulating the pressure that women face to morph into the male's ideal. Flynn is a self-identified feminist and has stated that Amy's "just pragmatically evil" character and non-conformity to the traditional perception of women as innately good characters are the embodiment of feminism, which she defined as "the ability to have women who are bad characters."

Amy's "Cool Girl" speech, and Nick's performing for his media spectators, highlight the importance of establishing and maintaining public appearances, however false. Flynn said: "The whole point is that these are two people pretending to be other people, better people, versions of the dream guy and dream girl, but each one couldn't keep it up, so they destroy each other". Amy creates her plan to frame her husband when Nick fails to maintain the false image that Amy married, which she feels she is owed for keeping her side of the bargain by pretending to be his "cool girl" fantasy. She only returns to him after he gives a convincing public performance in the role of perfect husband. However, it is not his sincerity she is attracted to, but the appearance of it; she knows he is putting on an act. Amy views Nick as her ideal husband in the end because she knows he must appear to be her ideal husband, permanently, due to her blackmail and the risk of public condemnation. In exchange, she will appear as an ideal wife and mother, a trade which Nick accepts. Both prefer the appearance projected by the other over the reality of who they are and the person they married.

== Genre ==
Gone Girl is an example of mystery, suspense, and crime genres. A Reader's Digest review noted that the book is "more than just a crime novel"; the reviewer describes it as a "masterful psychological thriller" which offers "an astute and thought-provoking look into two complex personalities". A Chicago Tribune review notes that Gone Girl uses many of the devices common to thrillers—a cast of viable suspects, unfolding secrets, and red herrings. However, the novel does more with these devices than the thriller genre requires: "While serving their usual functions, they also do much more, launching us into an unnerving dissection of the fallout of failed dreams."

In her New York Times review, Janet Maslin writes that the elements of Gone Girl that "sound like standard-issue crime story machinations" are not, because both narrators are also consummate liars and cannot be trusted to convey the truth about their own stories. Salon.com writes that Gone Girl has literary features that enhance the crime genre features, adding that Flynn is "kicking the genre into high gear." Flynn herself says that, in writing Gone Girl, she employed the mystery genre as a "thru-lane" to explore what she was really interested in: relationships.

== Composition and publication ==
Gillian Flynn is a former writer for Entertainment Weekly who wrote two popular novels prior to Gone Girl — Sharp Objects, and Dark Places. Gone Girl is her best selling book to date. Her other two books were about people incapable of making commitments, but in this novel, she tried to depict the ultimate commitment, marriage: "I liked the idea of marriage told as a he-said, she-said story, and told by two narrators who were perhaps not to be trusted." Flynn has also described marriage as "the ultimate mystery."

Ty Burr, a former coworker at Entertainment Weekly, asserts that Flynn "was really hung up on" the film, Leave Her to Heaven (1945), and it was a direct inspiration for the story.

Flynn admits to putting some of herself in the character of Nick Dunne. Like Dunne, she was a popular culture writer. Also, like Dunne, she was laid off after many years at the same job. Flynn said, "I certainly wove that experience, that sense of having something that you were going to do for the rest of your life and seeing that possibility taken away... I definitely wove that sense of unrest and nervousness into Nick's character."

Asked how she can write so believably about a man's inner life, Flynn says, "I'm kind of part guy myself." When she needs to understand something about how men think, she asks her husband or a male friend. Flynn's autobiographical essay "I Was Not a Nice Little Girl..." invites readers to believe she took inspiration for Amy Dunne from her own interior monologue. In that essay, Flynn confesses to sadistic childhood impulses like "stunning ants and feeding them to spiders." A favorite indoor game called "Mean Aunt Rosie" allowed Flynn to cast herself as a "witchy caregiver" who exercised malevolent influence over her cousins. The same essay argues that women fail to acknowledge their own violent impulses and incorporate them into their personal narratives, though men tend to cherish stories of their childhood meanness.

Flynn identified Zoë Heller's Notes on a Scandal and Edward Albee's Who's Afraid of Virginia Woolf? as influences on her writing and, in particular, on the plot and themes of Gone Girl. Flynn said she admired the "ominous" ending of Notes on a Scandal and the pathology of a bad marriage from Who's Afraid of Virginia Woolf?. For the conclusion of Gone Girl, Flynn drew from Rosemary's Baby; she said: "I love that it just ends with, you know, 'Hey, the devil's in the world, and guess what? Mom kind of likes him!'".

Flynn said that she was influenced by mystery writers Laura Lippman, Karin Slaughter, George Pelecanos, Dennis Lehane, and Harlan Coben. However, she tries not to read any one genre exclusively, and she also admires Joyce Carol Oates, Margaret Atwood, T. C. Boyle, and Arthur Phillips, who are better known as realistic contemporary writers.

Gone Girl is also the title of a Lew Archer story, in the 1955 collection The Name is Archer, by Ross Macdonald, whom Flynn has also cited as a favorite author.

Flynn has refuted the notion that she was inspired to write the novel by the 2002 murder of Laci Peterson in California, saying that although she saw parallels between that real-life case and her story, she makes a point not to rely on specific true accounts for her stories. Portraying her principal characters as out-of-work writers, she made use of her own experience being laid off from her job as a writer for Entertainment Weekly.

== Reception ==
Entertainment Weekly describes it as "an ingenious and viperish thriller". The New Yorker describes it as a "mostly well-crafted novel," praising its depiction of an "unraveling" marriage and a "recession-hit Midwest," while finding its conclusion somewhat "outlandish".

The New York Times likens Gillian Flynn to suspense novelist Patricia Highsmith: "Gone Girl is Flynn's dazzling breakthrough; the novel is wily, mercurial, subtly layered and populated by characters so well imagined that they're hard to part with." A USA Today review focuses on bookseller enthusiasm for the book, quoting a Jackson, Mississippi store manager saying, "It will make your head spin off." People Magazine's review found the novel "a delectable summer read" that burrows "deep into the murkiest corners of the human psyche." A Chatelaine review commends the novel's suspense, its intricately detailed plot and the way it keeps the reader "unnervingly off balance".

Many reviewers have noted the difficulty of writing about Gone Girl, because so little in the first half of the novel is what it seems to be. In his Time review, Lev Grossman describes the novel as a "house of mirrors." He said, "its content may be postmodern, but it takes the form of a thoroughbred thriller about the nature of identity and the terrible secrets that can survive and thrive in even the most intimate relationships."

In an article in Salon, Laura Miller laments that Gone Girl was conspicuously absent from the winning ranks of prestigious literary awards, like the National Book Awards, and the Pulitzer Prize. The same article argues that Gone Girl was snubbed because it belongs to the mystery genre. Judges awarding top literary prizes "have all refrained from honoring any title published within the major genres." Gone Girl was No. 7 on the inaugural Salon What To Read Awards in 2012. The novel has also been short-listed for the Women's Prize for Fiction. Natasha Walter, one of the Women's Prize judges in 2013, told the Independent that there was considerable debate among the judges about the inclusion of Gone Girl in the finalists' circle. Walter indicated that crime fiction is often "overlooked" by those in a position to make literary commendations. In 2026, Gone Girl was voted as the #1 Best Thriller Book of the 21st Century by The New York Times.

Gone Girl was No. 1 on the New York Times Hardcover Fiction Bestseller list for eight weeks. It was also twenty-six weeks on National Public Radio's hardcover fiction bestseller list. Culture writer Dave Itzkoff wrote that the novel was, excepting books in the Fifty Shades trilogy, the biggest literary phenomenon of 2012. By the end of its first year in publication, Gone Girl had sold over two million copies in print and digital editions, according to the book's publisher. In 2016, the book had sold more than 15 million copies. In 2019, it was reported that the book had sold 20 million copies.

== Adaptations ==
=== Audiobook ===
Gone Girl was recorded as a Random House audiobook, featuring the voices of Julia Whelan as Amy Dunne and Kirby Heyborne as Nick Dunne. It is an unabridged edition on fifteen compact discs and takes 19.25 hours to listen to in its entirety.

=== Film adaptation ===
American actress Reese Witherspoon's film production company and 20th Century Fox bought the screen rights to Gone Girl, for which they paid US$1.5 million. The novel's author Gillian Flynn was engaged to write the screenplay. Witherspoon produced the film version along with Leslie Dixon, Bruna Papandrea, and Ceán Chaffin. Witherspoon was drawn to the script because of its strong female character and its use of multiple perspectives and non-linear structure. In May 2013, it was announced that David Fincher was brought on as director, with Ben Affleck cast as Nick and Rosamund Pike in the role of Amy. New Regency and Fox agreed to co-finance the film. The film was released on October 3, 2014.
