= Rogues (anthology) =

2014 anthology edited by George R. R. Martin and Gardner Dozois

- First edition cover
- Editors: George R. R. Martin; Gardner Dozois
- Author: Various
- Cover artist: Oleg Zhevelev
- Language: English
- Genre: Science fiction/Fantasy
- Published: 17 June 2014
- Publisher: Bantam Spectra
- Publication place: United States
- Media type: Print (hardcover)
- Pages: 832
- ISBN: 978-0-345-53726-3
- OCLC: 866615115
- Preceded by: Dangerous Women

Rogues is a cross-genre anthology featuring 21 original short stories from various authors, edited by George R. R. Martin and Gardner Dozois, and released on June 17, 2014.

Of the book Martin said, "We’ve got something for everyone in Rogues … SF, mystery, historical fiction, epic fantasy, sword and sorcery, comedy, tragedy, crime stories, mainstream. And rogues, cads, scalawags, con men, thieves, and scoundrels of all descriptions. If you love Harry Flashman and Cugel the Clever, as I do, this is the book for you."

== Contents ==
“Everybody Loves a Rogue” (Introduction) by George R. R. Martin

1. “Tough Times All Over” by Joe Abercrombie
  In the city of Sipani, a package goes through multiple owners, each with a different viewpoint, starting with a courier who gets robbed.
2. “What Do You Do?” by Gillian Flynn
  An unnamed sex worker and fortune teller is hired to spiritually cleanse a wealthy woman's house but soon comes to believe she is in way over her head.
3. “The Inn of the Seven Blessings” by Matt Hughes
  A thief is interrupted in a haul when he touches an idol and soon finds himself rescuing its owner.
4. “Bent Twig” by Joe R. Lansdale
  Hap takes the law into his own hands to rescue a young woman from criminals in Tyler, Texas.
5. “Tawny Petticoats” by Michael Swanwick
  In a surreal Post-Utopian New Orleans full of zombies, two tricksters, named Darger and Surplus, attempt a huge con.
6. “Provenance” by David W. Ball
  The journey of a newly resurfaced Caravaggio through war and bloodshed to arrive in the present day.
7. “The Roaring Twenties” by Carrie Vaughn
  A tense confrontation in a speakeasy frequented by the magical crowd.
8. “A Year and a Day in Old Theradane” by Scott Lynch
  A retired thief is blackmailed into stealing an entire street within a year and a day.
9. “Bad Brass” by Bradley Denton
  When a group of high school students tries to sell stolen tubas, their substitute teacher plans on stealing their profits to teach them a lesson.
10. “Heavy Metal” by Cherie Priest
  A monster hunter is called in to a small town which is still recovering from a 150 year old ecological disaster
11. “The Meaning of Love” by Daniel Abraham
  In the slums a prince is in hiding - but now he has fallen in love with a young woman about to be sold as a slave.
12. “A Better Way to Die” by Paul Cornell
13. “Ill Seen in Tyre” by Steven Saylor
  A Greek poet and his apprentice stop in Tyre to purchase a magical tome
14. “A Cargo of Ivories” by Garth Nix
15. “Diamonds From Tequila” by Walter Jon Williams
16. “The Caravan to Nowhere” by Phyllis Eisenstein
17. “The Curious Affair of the Dead Wives” by Lisa Tuttle
18. “How the Marquis Got His Coat Back” by Neil Gaiman
  Following Neverwhere, the Marquis de Carabas seeks to recover his lost signature coat somewhere in London Below.
19. “Now Showing” by Connie Willis
20. “The Lightning Tree” by Patrick Rothfuss Follows an average day in the life of Bast, the mysterious innkeeper's even more mysterious assistant.
21. "The Rogue Prince, or, a King’s Brother" by George R. R. Martin, set in the Westeros of Martin's A Song of Ice and Fire series, hundreds of years before the events of A Game of Thrones
  This is a prequel to The Princess and the Queen (2013) and focuses on the actions of King Viserys I Targaryen's brother, Prince Daemon Targaryen.

== Reception ==
The anthology as a whole was nominated for the 2015 World Fantasy Award for Best Anthology and won the 2015 Locus Award for best anthology. Gillian Flynn's contribution to this anthology -- "What Do You Do?"—won the Edgar Award for short story, 2015. It was later republished in hardcover, under the title "The Grownup".
