= Sharp Objects =

Novel by Gillian Flynn

- First paperback edition cover
- Author: Gillian Flynn
- Language: English
- Genre: Domestic noir; mystery; psychological thriller; Southern gothic
- Published: Shaye Areheart Books (2006); Broadway Books (2013)
- Publication place: United States
- Pages: 254
- ISBN: 0307341550

Sharp Objects is the 2006 debut novel by American author Gillian Flynn. It is told from the perspective of Camille Preaker, a newspaper journalist who returns to her hometown in Missouri to report on a series of murders. There, she reconnects with her estranged mother and 13-year-old half sister. The domestic noir, mystery, psychological thriller, and Southern Gothic novel explores femininity, trauma, and abuse.

Flynn began writing Sharp Objects in 2001; she wanted to explore female violence and to deviate from the popular chick lit novels of the time. It was first published by Shaye Areheart Books on September 26, 2006; critics acclaimed the novel, and praised its prose, atmosphere, characters, and depth. Initial sales were perceived as modest, but sales increased following the publication of Flynn's third novel, Gone Girl (2012), and that same year, Sharp Objects sold over 230,000 copies. A television miniseries adaptation aired on HBO in 2018, and became a critical and commercial success.

== Plot ==
Camille Preaker works as a journalist at The Daily Post, a small newspaper in Chicago. She is dissatisfied with her job, which involves covering stories about crime and human suffering. Camille has a complicated relationship with her boss, Frank Curry, who supported her after a recent hospitalization for self-harm. Camille has a history of carving words into her skin.

Curry assigns Camille to cover the child murder of Ann Nash and the missing-child case of Natalie Keene in her hometown, Wind Gap, Missouri. Camille stays with her estranged mother, Adora; her stepfather, Alan; and her 13-year-old half sister, Amma); all of whom live in Adora's Victorian mansion. Adora is the heir to the town's central industry of pork farming; her relationship with Camille has always been troubled, especially after the death of Marian, Adora's younger daughter, during Camille's youth.

Camile gathers information from the residents of Wind Gap, including Ann's family. The local police offer little insight but Chief Vickery, the town sheriff, tells her, off the record, he believes the perpetrator is a local resident. When Natalie is found strangled with her teeth removed, Curry asks Camille to stay in town to continue reporting unfolding events.

After reconnecting with Adora and Amma, Adora tells Camille she does not love her because she reminds Adora of her emotionally withdrawn mother, Joya. Amma, who was born after Marian's death, is a manipulative teenager who hides her rebellious behavior from Adora. Camille also forms a relationship with Richard Willis, a detective from Kansas City who is investigating the possibility of a serial killer.

As Camille continues her investigation, she enters into a sexual relationship with Richard but avoids revealing her scars. She also grows closer to Amma, who takes her to a party where they drink and use drugs. Afterward, Camille wakes to find Adora giving her medication that makes her ill. Camille soon realizes Adora suffers from Munchausen syndrome by proxy (Note: Later known as factitious disorder imposed on another) and was responsible for Marian's death. A letter from a nurse who cared for Marian confirms these suspicions. Camille also learns Richard suspects Adora of murdering Ann and Natalie .

Camille returns to her Adora's house, where she poisons Camille and tries to "care for" her. Camille loses consciousness, but is rescued when Richard and the police arrive to arrest Adora. Richard is shocked by Camille's scars and their relationship ends. Adora is charged with the murders of Marian, Ann, and Natalie, and Amma is sent to live with Camille in Chicago. Initially, Amma seems to adjust well, doting on Camille. Camille forms a bond with one of Amma's classmates, who is later found murdered with six of her teeth pulled. It is revealed Amma is responsible for the murders of Ann and Natalie: jealous of the attention Adora gave to the victims, she killed the girls in partnership with three of her friends. Before Adora's arrest, Amma and one of the friends were plotting to kill the fourth, who was feeling guilt for the crimes she had committed. Amma is arrested. Distraught, Camille resumes self-harming but is stopped by Curry and his wife, who take her in as their own daughter.

== Themes ==
=== Femininity ===
Sharp Objects explores the dark side of femininity and how women treat each other. Wind Gap is described as a town that "demands utmost femininity in its fairer sex", and where marriage and motherhood are key parts of a woman's social standing. The novel depicts femininity as a conscious performance that hides female anger, with an emphasis on the contrasts between outward feminine performance and concealed transgressions. For example, Amma acts like a young girl in her mother's presence, but sexualizes herself and murders others while she is with her friends. Similarly, Adora is seen as the epitome of femininity and maternity due to her perceived sophistication, care for Marian, and empathy. She, however, has Munchausen syndrome by proxy and uses her children's illnesses to elicit praise from others. In contrast, Camille has difficult relationships with her femininity and sexual identity. Other characters are disturbed by Camille's presence since she, according to philologist Agnieszka Gawron, epitomizes a form of femininity the patriarchy views as "inappropriate and threatening". The Australian academic Eleanore Gardner said Camille reflects anxieties about women who do not fit ideals of femininity because she is always associated with self-harm, sexual desire, and maternal control. (Note: According to Gardner, Camille is associated with self-harm, sexual desire, and maternal control because her cutting begins around the time she started masturbating; she experiences sexual abuse as a teenager; she has sexual relationships with Richard and John; and her mother's mistreatment plays a role in her self-harm.)

Scholars typically interpret the novel's portrayal of violence and self-harm as a feminist or postfeminist critique of submission and inequality. The depiction of femininity has been linked to violence, criminality, and monstrosity by Maysaa Jaber, and to oppression and subjugation by Gawron. Gardner and the literature professor Bernice M. Murphy regard the pigs' slaughter as an allegory for patriarchal violence and societal mistreatment of women, respectively. Gardner interprets Amma's fascination with the slaughter as a indicator of her internalization of methods of patriarchal violence. According to the author Leigh Redhead, both Amma and Camille are shown to have "absorbed" Wind Gap's misogynistic values and manifest them through violent actions.

Amma murders Ann and Natalie because of their tomboyish personalities, with the intention of regaining her mother's affection. According to Redhead, the novel critiques postfeminist empowerment by portraying Amma, the most-autonomous character, as a "psychopathic" killer. According to Gawron, Amma's murders reveal an "internalization of patriarchal methods of gender control based on objectification and violence", likening the character to a colonizer who punishes female otherness. Similarly, communication studies associate professor Alyson Miller writes that the murders exemplify the patriarchal ideas of exterminating the other and silencing women, and that they reveal a compulsive abhorrence for female bodies. Amma removes her victims' teeth, paints their fingernails, shaves their legs, and applies makeup to them. According to Miller, she makes their bodies "docile" and they are "returned to a place of submission within the domestic sphere, forced back into line with the ideologies they have so flagrantly transgressed".

=== Trauma and abuse ===
Sharp Objects examines cycles of abuse and trauma. As a child, Adora's emotionally withdrawn mother, Joya, left her in a forest and forced her to find her way back home alone. As a result of Joya's cold treatment, Adora is unable to properly love and care for her children, and has Munchausen syndrome by proxy. She craves admiration, leading her to become controlling to ensure her image as the perfect mother remains intact. Miller compares Adora's behavior to the folk tale tradition vagina dentata and Julia Kristeva's interpretation of the symbolic figure of the archaic mother.

Adora's mistreatment results in her daughters becoming violent in different ways, which Gardner and Miller interpret as attempts to gain control. Amma becomes dissociative and later murderous; Jaber describes her as a "monstrous double of the mother", since both she and Adora killed girls. Jaber states the ubiquity of Adora's influence makes her partially responsible for Amma's murders. According to the literature assistant professor Soheila Farhani Nejad, Adora's treatment makes her daughters unable to cross into Kristeva's symbolic stage, in which a child develops the ability to consciously express themself and communicate. She says because they are forced to depend on Adora, Amma and Camille cannot simultaneously maintain their relationships with their mother and form their own separate identities. Nejad states Camille's self-harm and Amma's behavioral shifts are rooted in their inability to separate their identities from Adora.

Camille's behavior is shaped by her childhood trauma, including Marian's death and Adora's mistreatment. Unable to process these incidents in a healthy manner, she begins engaging in self-harm, which Nejad interprets as an act of self-punishment for her guilt and self-loathing. She likens the simultaneous care and abuse in Camille's self-harm—she tends to her wounds after cutting herself—to her relationship with her mother. Camille also develops what the literature academics Mehrgan Rezaeian, Behzad Pourgharib, and Abdolbaghi Rezaei Talarposhti identify as post-traumatic stress disorder; she has nightmares after returning to her childhood home and feels anxious around Adora. At the end of Sharp Objects, Curry and his wife take in Camille after she relapses; according to Gawron, this highlights family should be based on "care and empathy" rather than "blood and tradition".

=== Commentary on the American South ===
Sharp Objects takes place in southeastern Missouri, near the border with Tennessee. According to Miller, through its focus on a family of troubled women, the novel "exposes the complex rendering of femininity in relation to the social rules of Southern etiquette". The literature professor Mattias Pirholt says elements of Southern U.S. history are "inconspicuously yet deeply present". He regards the architecture of the Crellin home—including Adora's ivory floors—and the pigs' slaughter as metaphors for slavery and racism. According to Pirholt, by portraying Wind Gap as "both the south and not the south", Flynn highlights the region's issues are prevalent across the United States. The literature assistant professor Marco Petrelli said Sharp Objects depicts the American South as a region caught between its modern, industrialized reality and its idealized antebellum past. According to Petrelli, Wind Gap's attempts to preserve its distorted vision of the past led the town to "devour itself in an effort to get out of this cul-de-sac".

== Genre and style ==
Sharp Objects is a domestic noir, mystery, psychological thriller, and Southern Gothic novel. It contains plot twists, suspense, and misdirection. The novel's author, Gillian Flynn, describes it as "a murder mystery wrapped around a character study"; it shifts its focus between the whodunit plot and Camille's struggles with her familial relationships. The story is told from the first-person perspective. According to Gawron, because the narrative is filtered through Camille's consciousness, the suspense is dependent on her experiences and perspectives, shifting the mystery's focus from the identity of the girls' killer to the reasons for Camille's suffering.

Academics have noted the novel's Gothic elements, including the depiction of Camille's body—interpreted as abject—the resurfacing of traumatic pasts, the eerie atmosphere of Adora's house, and the explorations of motherhood and the monstrous feminine. They view Adora's simultaneous care for and violence toward children as emblematic of a Gothic vampire. Gawron says Flynn blends the Southern Gothic and female Gothic subgenres by exploring female experiences and oppression within the culture and history of the American South. According to Pirholt, Flynn uses physical spaces and architecture to connect the American South's present with its past; for example, Adora's Victorian mansion is juxtaposed with the nearby pig farm, highlighting both the romanticized and problematic elements of the South's past. According to the scholar Antoine Dechêne, Wind Gap, a town populated with "haunted houses and dark forests", is characteristic of Southern Gothic. Female Gothic elements include the subjective narrative viewpoint, and the depiction of the home as a place that evokes anxiety and dread.

Camille's scars are a key literature device. In several scenes, she feels certain words on her skin when memories resurface. Jaber describes Camille's scars as a "vehicle" to express the trauma she cannot verbalize.

== Background ==
Flynn took inspiration from the fairy tales of the Brothers Grimm (illustration of "Hansel and Gretel" pictured).

Flynn began writing her debut novel in 2001. At the time, she was a writer for Entertainment Weekly; she had initially pursued a career as a crime reporter because she was interested in "turning over a rock and seeing what's underneath". Flynn wrote Sharp Objects after work during evenings, nights, and weekends; she found transitioning between writing styles difficult. Flynn credited Sharp Objects's dark tone to her avoidance of the "humorous, conversational" tone she used for her Entertainment Weekly pieces. She aimed for the novel to be "as dark as possible", and for it to discuss female violence, a topic she thought was under-represented in literature.

Sharp Objects underwent several rewrites and Flynn abandoning it many times. Her initial draft featured women discussing violence and rage in many rooms, a version she felt was more akin to an essay. After reading the 2001 police procedural novel Mystic River by Dennis Lehane, Flynn was inspired incorporate a mystery as Sharp Objects's "engine". She eventually conceived the premise of a journalist writing about a crime in her hometown. Flynn cited her real-life experiences with depression and self-destructive behavior, and the fairy tales of the Brothers Grimm as influences. She also took inspiration from V. C. Andrews's Gothic novel Flowers in the Attic (1979), and referenced the psychological horror film Rosemary's Baby (1968) and the surrealist mystery horror television series Twin Peaks (1990–1991).

Flynn wanted to write about "darker side of the female psyche", exploring why women act immorally; this became the genesis for Camille's character. At the time, chick lit novels that drove Flynn "slowly insane", such as Bridget Jones's Diary (1996), were popular. According to Flynn, male characters had been depicted as "dark, damaged, screwed-up, [and] troubled" for centuries, but their female counterparts did not display the same degree of dysfunctionality. She wanted her protagonist to be "the opposite" of the characters in chick lit novels, so she characterized Camille as unstable and disturbed. Flynn was particularly interested in a toxic relationship between a mother and daughter, saying that it had been insufficiently depicted in literature.

Flynn did not use an outline, and consulted doctors and dentists about the novel's medical passages; she said she limited the amount of research she conducted to maintain Sharp Objects' "gothic-fairy-tale-gone-wrong tone", not wanting it to read as though it were a police procedural novel. The novel began to take shape once she was around halfway through the writing process. Originally, Amma did not appear and the killer was a cheerleader. Initial versions included occasional appearances by a group of girls; Flynn began integrating them into more passages before realizing she wanted to incorporate Amma as Camille's sister.

== Publication history ==
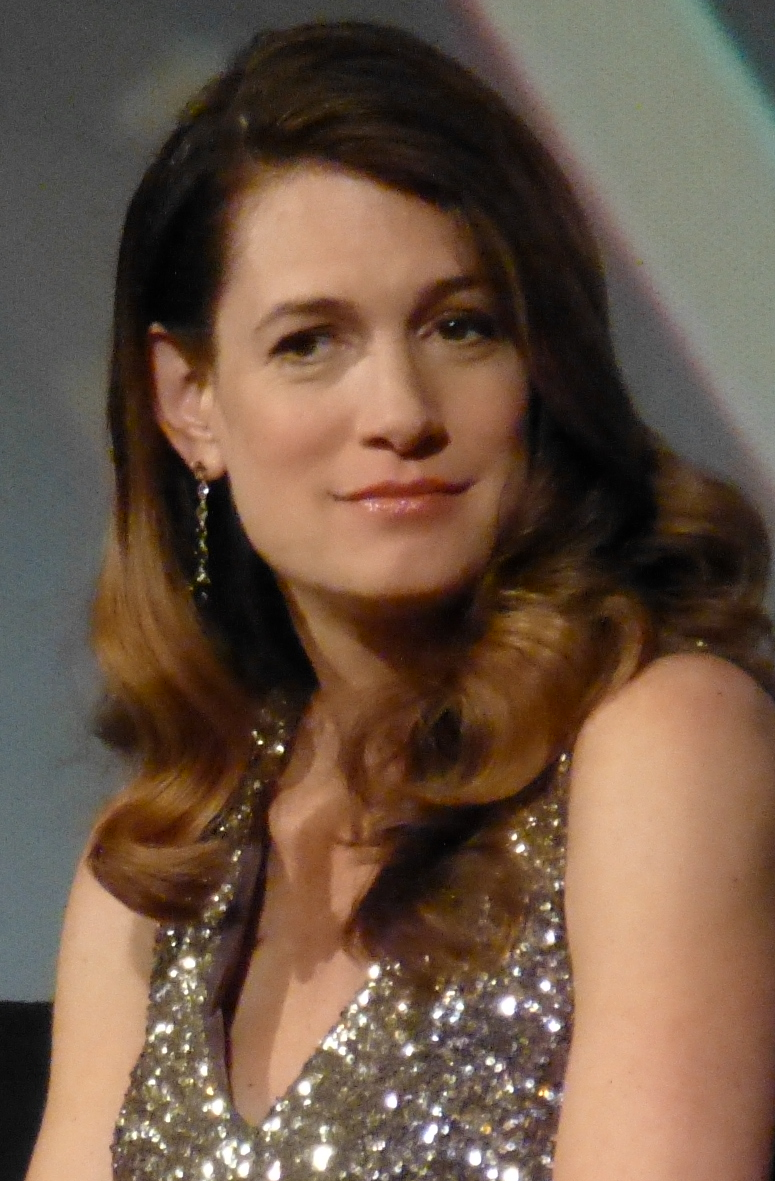
Gillian Flynn (pictured in 2014) began submitting Sharp Objects to publishers in 2005.

In 2005, Flynn began unsuccessfully submitting Sharp Objects to publishers; they believed readers would find its focus on flawed female characters unappealing. Eventually, Crown Publishing Group took interest, and Shaye Areheart Books first published the novel in the United States on September 26, 2006, as a hardcover. The novel had a first printing of 100,000 copies and Flynn promoted it with a five-city tour. It was also published in ebook and audiobook formats; the latter of which was narrated by Ann Marie Lee, whose delivery Publishers Weekly lauded as "chillingly effective". Crown published a paperback edition on July 31, 2007. Newspapers characterized the novel's initial sales as "modest", "solid but unspectacular", and "fine; nothing remotely blockbustery". By mid-June 2012, Sharp Objects had sold 96,251 copies.

Following the publication of Flynn's third novel, Gone Girl (2012), sales of Sharp Objects increased, selling more than 160,000 copies by July and over 310,000 by November. Also in 2012, the novel sold over 130,000 paperback copies and over 100,000 ebook copies. In April 2013, Broadway Books published a repackaged edition with a print run of 50,000 copies. By that month, the novel had spent 28 weeks on The New York Times Best Seller list, and it sold over 200,000 paperback copies in 2013. Following the release of Gone Girl's film adaptation in 2014, Sharp Objects experienced another resurgence in sales. To support the 2018 television miniseries adaptation of Sharp Objects, Broadway Books published a tie-in edition in June that year, and the following month, the novel re-entered and topped The New York Times Best Seller list. As of October 2018, it had spent 57 weeks on the list.

== Reception ==
Sharp Objects has received critical acclaim. Critics praised the novel as a "chilling", "terrific", "haunting", "skillful and disturbing", and "savage" debut. Alan Cheuse of Chicago Tribune and Les Roberts of The Plain Dealer considered its quality characteristic of the work of a seasoned writer. The horror author Stephen King described Sharp Objects as an "admirably nasty piece of work". In 2026, the staff and readers of The New York Times ranked Sharp Objects as the 19th-best and 77th-best thriller novel of the 21st century, respectively; and users of the social cataloging website Goodreads voted it one of the "100 Thrillers to Read in a Lifetime".

Several reviewers emphasized the novel's unsettling qualities. The Kansas City Star writer Leslie McGill described Sharp Objects as "one of the best and most disturbing books I have read in a long time", adding its darkness and cruelty created characters that lingered in her mind well after she finished reading. San Francisco Chronicle's David Lazarus, Chicago Sun-Times's Joe Kolina, and Publishers Weekly lauded the novel's use of misdirection, suspense, and dread, respectively; the latter also highlighted the "shocking, dreadful and memorable double ending". Other critics singled out Flynn's prose; The Washington Post writer Patrick Anderson deemed it one of the novel's strongest attributes, especially its alternations between "acidic" writing and lyricism. Likewise, Roberts lauded Flynn's writing style as anguished and lyrical, and likened it to that of a literary novel. In contrast, Tom Walker of Denver Post gave attention to Flynn's dialogue and pacing, favorably comparing them to King's.

The characters were praised; Roberts guaranteed they would "worm their way uncomfortably beneath your skin". Kolina commented Camille's "sensitive yet disturbing" characterization and Flynn's "emphatic understanding" of her characters produced an "especially engrossing story" and "sure and true" storytelling, respectively. Similarly, Kirkus Reviews lauded the "appalling, heartbreaking" examination of the darkness of womanhood. Critics also said the novel possesses depth; The Guardian described it as "[r]elentless, often creepy, but never less than real", while Anderson highlighted Flynn's "unsparing eye for human imperfection and for the evil that moves among us". According to Cheuse, Sharp Objects combines the storytelling style of genre fiction with the psychological depth of a character study. Publishers Weekly was less positive, calling several characters "clichés hiding behind secrets". Some critics have objected to the violence, child abuse, and self-harm perpetrated by the female characters, accusing Flynn of misogyny. In response, Flynn said the criticisms are themselves misogynistic because they police a woman's writing, and deny female characters the capacity for malice and depth.

=== Accolades ===
| Award | Year | Category | Result | Ref. |
|---|---|---|---|---|
| Crime Writers' Association Awards | 2007 | Gold Dagger | Shortlisted | |
| Crime Writers' Association Awards | 2007 | Ian Fleming Steel Dagger | Won | |
| Crime Writers' Association Awards | 2007 | New Blood Dagger | Won | |
| Edgar Awards | 2007 | Best First Novel | Shortlisted | |

== Adaptation ==
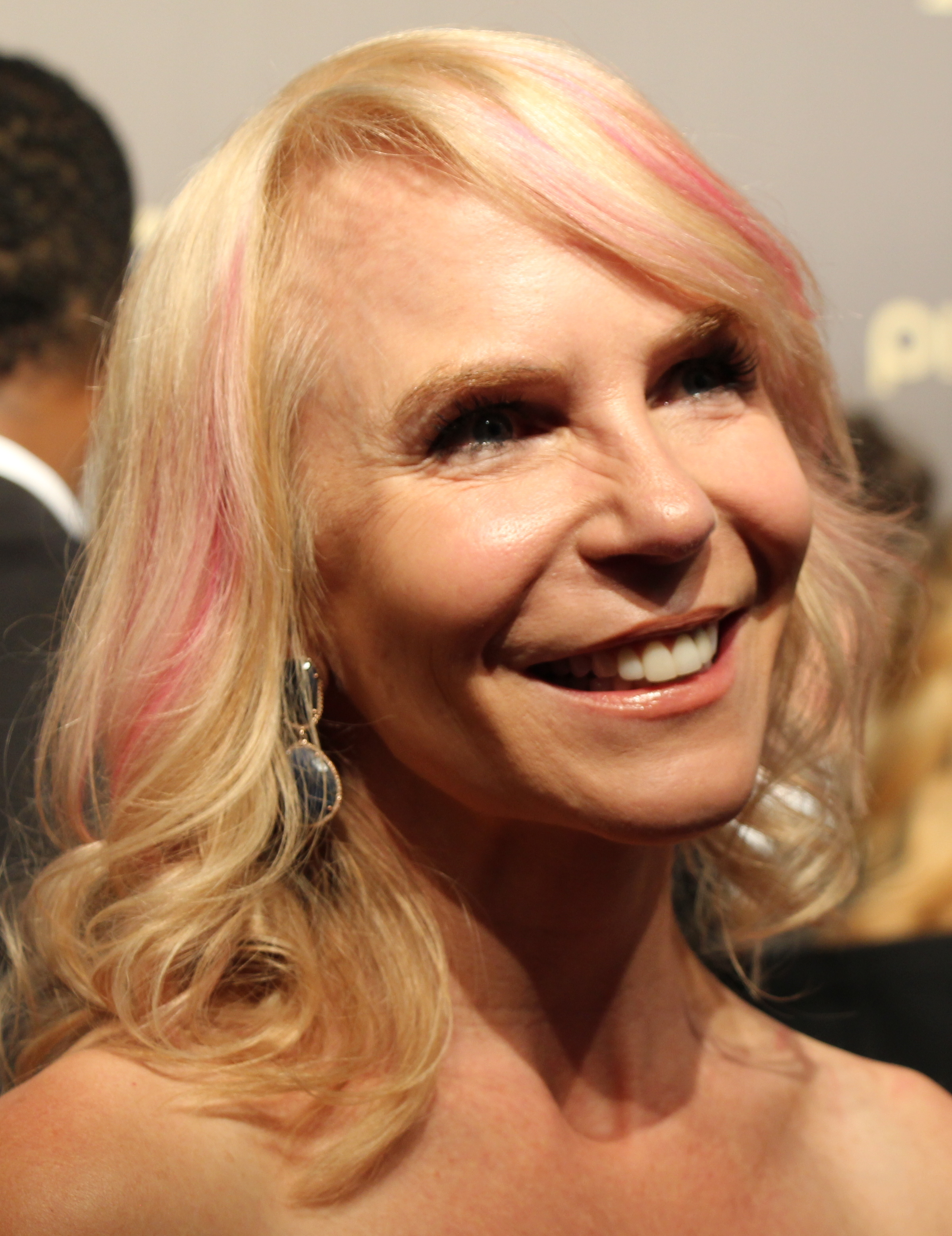
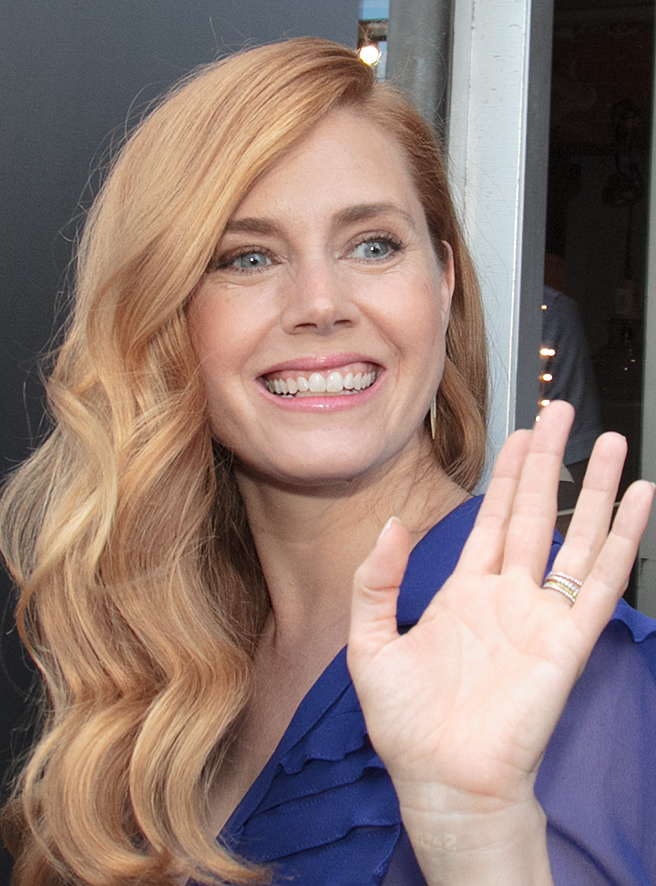
The miniseries adaptation of Sharp Objects was created by Marti Noxon (left) and stars Amy Adams (right) as Camille.

Since 2006, the rights for Sharp Objects were purchased several times before an adaptation materialized. In 2008, the British filmmaker Andrea Arnold was set to direct a film adaptation produced by the French company Pathé, but she later abandoned it. In 2012, Alliance Films purchased the rights for Jason Blum, who intended to produce a film. The writer Marti Noxon persuaded Blum to adapt the novel as a miniseries instead, because she believed Camille's complexity needed a longer runtime. After the first episode was written, Amy Adams was cast as Camille. She recruited Jean-Marc Vallée to direct the series. Flynn wrote or co-wrote three episodes, and was involved with the entire creative process.

The miniseries has the same premise as the novel, though it occasionally deviates from its source material. For example, the show places greater emphasis on the impact of Marian's death on Camille and expands Richard's role. The writers decided against using a voice-over for Camille; instead, the series incorporates flashbacks and what Vallée described as a "visual internal voice-over" (Note: Valleé intended to use the visuals to give audiences glimpses into Camille's thoughts. For example, when she walks toward a car in the first episode, the scene briefly cuts to her imagining the word "dirty" written on the trunk.) to explore Camille's perspective and thoughts. Sharp Objects originally aired on HBO between July 6 and August 26, 2018, and received critical acclaim, and praise for its atmosphere and performances. It was a ratings success, averaging over seven million viewers per episode across all platforms. At the 71st Primetime Emmy Awards, the show received eight nominations, including Outstanding Limited or Anthology Series.
