= Ève Brenner =

French opera singer (born 1941)

- Born: 11 September 1941 (age 84); Saint-Chartier, Indre, France
- Occupation: Opera singer
- Known for: Le Matin sur la rivière (1976)
- Children: 2, including Gilles Paquet-Brenner

Ève Brenner (born 11 September 1941) is a French opera singer notable for her voice that spanned five octaves.

== Early life ==
Brenner was born in Saint-Chartier in central France where her parents who were both musicians and refugees were living. Her father, Ludwig Brenner, who was of Jewish-German descent, was captured and deported during World War II. He died in captivity in 1942 leaving her mother Jeanne alone to raise their children.

When the family returned to Paris at the end of the war, her mother rejoined her orchestra and left her children in the care of their grandparents. Aged 14, Brenner left school to join her mother's orchestra.

== Music career ==
Brenner studied opera at the Conservatoire de Paris from the age of 20. She sang in films, including Manon des Sources. She released several singles and EPs from the 1970s onward. Her single "Le matin sur la rivière" peaked at number 8 in the Dutch Top 40. In 1979 it peaked at number 96 in Australia under the English title "Morning at the river".

=== Singles and EPs ===
- Le matin sur la rivière, 1976, Pathé
- La sicilienne, 1977, Pathé
- L'enfant, 1979, Pathé
- A comme Amour, 1979, Delphine Records
- Memories, 1980, Pathé
- "Hymne", 1980, Kébec-Disque
- Amoureuse, 1981, Philips/Phonogram
- Au nom de l'amour, Delphine Records
- Le rêve d’Ève, 1984, Philips/Phonogram
- Ave Maria Norma, 1985, Carrier
- Keep going, 1987, CBS
