= Divorce (TV series) =

American television series

- Genre: Comedy drama
- Created by: Sharon Horgan
- Starring: Sarah Jessica Parker; Thomas Haden Church; Molly Shannon; Talia Balsam; Tracy Letts; Sterling Jerins; Charlie Kilgore; Becki Newton
- Composer: Keegan DeWitt
- Country of origin: United States
- Original language: English
- No. of seasons: 3
- No. of episodes: 24

Production
- Executive producers: Sharon Horgan; Paul Simms; Aaron Kaplan; Sarah Jessica Parker; Alison Benson; Jenny Bicks; Liz Tuccillo
- Camera setup: Single-camera
- Running time: 30 minutes
- Production companies: Merman Films; Pretty Matches Productions; Kapital Entertainment; 343 Incorporated (season 1); Perkins Street Productions (season 2); Tuccillo (season 3); HBO Entertainment

Original release
- Network: HBO
- Release: October 9, 2016 – August 5, 2019

Divorce (styled as Divorce.) is an American comedy-drama television series created by Sharon Horgan, set in Hastings-on-Hudson, New York, and starring Sarah Jessica Parker and Thomas Haden Church as a middle-aged divorcing couple. The series premiered on HBO on October 9, 2016. The pilot episode was written by Horgan and directed by Jesse Peretz. On November 14, 2016, HBO renewed the show for a second season, which premiered on January 14, 2018. On November 2, 2018, HBO renewed the show for a third season, which was later announced on its premiere date to be the final season.

== Cast ==
=== Main ===
- Sarah Jessica Parker as Frances Dufresne, a married woman who has an affair which precipitates her divorce
- Thomas Haden Church as Robert Dufresne, Frances' hapless husband who discovers the affair and divorces her
- Molly Shannon as Diane, Frances' high-strung friend
- Talia Balsam as Dallas Holt, Frances' close friend
- Tracy Letts as Nick, Diane's husband (seasons 1–2; guest season 3)
- Sterling Jerins as Lila Dufresne, Frances and Robert's daughter
- Charlie Kilgore as Tom Dufresne, Frances and Robert's son
- Becki Newton as Jackie Giannopolis, Robert's new girlfriend and later wife (season 3; recurring season 2)

=== Recurring ===
- Jemaine Clement as Julian Renaut
- Alex Wolff (seasons 1-2), Isaac Josephthal (season 3) as Cole Holt
- Dean Winters as Tony Silvercreek
- Jeffrey DeMunn as Max Brodkin
- Roslyn Ruff as Sylvia
- Yul Vazquez as Craig Anders
- Keisha Zollar as Grace
- Jorge Chapa as Sebastian
- Danny Garcia as Gabriel
- James Lesure as Henry

== Production ==
In December 2014, it was announced Sarah Jessica Parker had been cast in the pilot and would also serve as an executive producer. In February 2015, Molly Shannon, Thomas Haden Church and Jemaine Clement joined the series. In November 2015, Alex Wolff joined the cast. In December 2015, Sterling Jerins joined the cast.

== Episodes ==
| Season | Episodes | Originally released | |
| Season | Episodes | First released | Last released |
|---|---|---|---|
| 1 | 10 | October 9, 2016 | December 11, 2016 |
| 2 | 8 | January 14, 2018 | March 4, 2018 |
| 3 | 6 | July 1, 2019 | August 5, 2019 |

=== Season 1 (2016) ===
| No. overall | No. in season | Title | Directed by | Written by | Original release date | U.S. viewers (millions) |
|---|---|---|---|---|---|---|
| 1 | 1 | "Pilot" | Jesse Peretz | Sharon Horgan | October 9, 2016 (Note: The first episode was released online on October 7, 2016, two days before the series premiere.) | 0.570 |
| 2 | 2 | "Next Day" | Jesse Peretz | Sharon Horgan & Paul Simms | October 16, 2016 | 0.849 |
| 3 | 3 | "Counseling" | Jesse Peretz | Sharon Horgan & Paul Simms | October 23, 2016 | 0.637 |
| 4 | 4 | "Mediation" | Ben Taylor | Patricia Breen | October 30, 2016 | 0.518 |
| 5 | 5 | "Gustav" | Adam Bernstein | Cindy Chupack | November 6, 2016 | 0.530 |
| 6 | 6 | "Christmas" | Jamie Babbit | Tom Scharpling | November 13, 2016 | 0.512 |
| 7 | 7 | "Weekend Plans" | Adam Bernstein | Adam Resnick | November 20, 2016 | 0.622 |
| 8 | 8 | "Church" | Beth McCarthy-Miller | Hayes Davenport | November 27, 2016 | 0.631 |
| 9 | 9 | "Another Party" | Jesse Peretz | Gabrielle Allan & Jennifer Crittenden | December 4, 2016 | 0.638 |
| 10 | 10 | "Detente" | Jesse Peretz | Hayes Davenport & Sharon Horgan & Adam Resnick & Tom Scharpling & Paul Simms | December 11, 2016 | 0.497 |

=== Season 2 (2018) ===
| No. overall | No. in season | Title | Directed by | Written by | Original release date | U.S. viewers (millions) |
|---|---|---|---|---|---|---|
| 11 | 1 | "Night Moves" | Adam Bernstein | Jenny Bicks | January 14, 2018 | 0.647 |
| 12 | 2 | "Happy Now?" | Adam Bernstein | Julie Rottenberg & Elisa Zuritsky | January 21, 2018 | 0.565 |
| 13 | 3 | "Worth It" | Wendey Stanzler | Liz Tuccillo | January 28, 2018 | 0.431 |
| 14 | 4 | "Ohio" | Janicza Bravo | Adam Resnick | February 2, 2018 (online); February 4, 2018 (HBO) | 0.229 |
| 15 | 5 | "Breaking the Ice" | Beth McCarthy-Miller | Stuart Zicherman | February 11, 2018 | 0.572 |
| 16 | 6 | "Losing It" | Scott Ellis | Kristen Lange | February 18, 2018 | 0.528 |
| 17 | 7 | "Going, Going... Gone" | Adam Bernstein | Julie Rottenberg & Elisa Zuritsky | February 25, 2018 | 0.537 |
| 18 | 8 | "Alone Again, Naturally" | Adam Bernstein | Jenny Bicks | March 4, 2018 | 0.452 |

=== Season 3 (2019) ===
| No. overall | No. in season | Title | Directed by | Written by | Original release date | U.S. viewers (millions) |
|---|---|---|---|---|---|---|
| 19 | 1 | "Charred" | Ryan Case | Liz Tuccillo | July 1, 2019 | 0.369 |
| 20 | 2 | "Miami" | Shira Piven | Mark Steilen | July 8, 2019 | 0.328 |
| 21 | 3 | "Gaps & Bunches" | Ryan Case | Adam Resnick | July 15, 2019 | 0.281 |
| 22 | 4 | "Bad Manners" | So Yong Kim | Lisa Albert & Liz Tuccillo | July 22, 2019 | 0.330 |
| 23 | 5 | "Away Games" | Rachel Lee Goldenberg | Adam Resnick | July 29, 2019 | 0.311 |
| 24 | 6 | "Knock Knock" | Ryan Case | Liz Tuccillo & Mark Steilen | August 5, 2019 | 0.251 |

== Broadcast ==
The series premiered in the United Kingdom on Sky Atlantic on October 11, 2016. It premiered in Australia on Showcase on October 12, 2016.

== Reception ==
=== Critical response ===
Divorce has received mixed to positive reviews from television critics. On Rotten Tomatoes the first season has a rating of 63%, based on 51 reviews, with an average rating of 5.8/10. The site's critical consensus reads, "While the execution borders on superficial, the dark humor and character chemistry in Divorce hit the mark." On Metacritic, the first season has a score of 60 out of 100, based on 37 critics, indicating "mixed or average reviews".

=== Accolades ===
| Year | Award | Category | Recipients | Result | Ref. |
|---|---|---|---|---|---|
| 2017 | Golden Globe Awards | Best Actress – Television Series Musical or Comedy | Sarah Jessica Parker | Nominated | |
| 2017 | Primetime Emmy Awards | Outstanding Cinematography for a Single-Camera Series (Half-Hour) | Reed Morano (for "Pilot") | Nominated | |
