= And So It Goes (film) =

- Theatrical release poster
- Directed by: Rob Reiner
- Written by: Mark Andrus
- Produced by: Alan Greisman; Mark Damon; Jared Ian Goldman; Rob Reiner
- Starring: Michael Douglas; Diane Keaton; Sterling Jerins
- Cinematography: Reed Morano
- Edited by: Dorian Harris
- Music by: Marc Shaiman
- Production companies: Castle Rock Entertainment; Foresight Unlimited; Envision Entertainment
- Distributed by: Clarius Entertainment Freestyle Releasing
- Release date: July 25, 2014
- Running time: 94 minutes
- Country: United States
- Language: English
- Budget: $18 million
- Box office: $25.4 million

And So It Goes is a 2014 American comedy drama film directed by Rob Reiner and written by Mark Andrus. The film stars Michael Douglas, Diane Keaton and Sterling Jerins.

Self-absorbed realtor Oren enlists the help of his neighbor Leah when he is suddenly left in charge of Sarah, the granddaughter he suddenly meets, when his estranged son Luke drops her off at his home. In the process, the pair is able to heal emotionally.

The film was released on July 25, 2014, received mostly negative reviews from critics, and performed modestly at the box office. The film was the second collaboration between Reiner and Douglas, after The American President (1995). This film was also Frances Sternhagen's final feature film role before her death on November 27, 2023.

== Plot ==
Oren Little, a realtor by trade, develops self-absorption, turning his back on his neighbors and shunning the notion of kindness to others. After his wife dies, part of his self-absorption is having no patience for children, not even his own now-adult estranged son. His next-door neighbor, Leah, whose own husband has likewise died, never had any children of her own, which leads her to throw her soul and her tears into reviving a singing career that had stagnated.

One day, Oren's estranged son Luke suddenly leaves his father in charge of his own ten-year-old daughter Sarah, a granddaughter who Oren never knew existed. When Luke drops Sarah off at his home, needing his father to take care of her, neither Oren nor Leah, each of whom are lonely souls, have any reason to suspect that Sarah's involvement with their lives will enable them to heal their emotional wounds.

== Cast ==
- Michael Douglas as Oren Little
- Diane Keaton as Leah
- Sterling Jerins as Sarah Little
- Annie Parisse as Kate
- Rob Reiner as Artie
- Albert Jones as Reggie
- Yaya DaCosta as Kennedy
- Paloma Guzmán as Selena
- Scott Shepherd as Luke Little
- Frances Sternhagen as Claire
- Andy Karl as Ted Westburg
- Frankie Valli as Club Owner
- David Aaron Baker as David Shaw
- Theo Stockman as Russell
- Meryl Williams as Rita

== Production ==
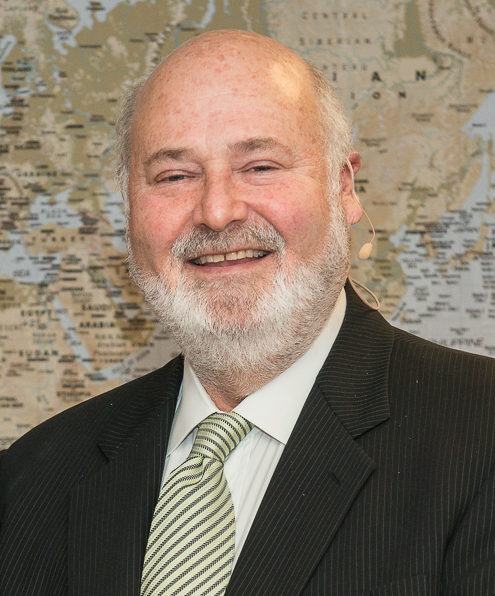
Rob Reiner in 2013

Filming began in June 2013 in Connecticut. Shooting also took place in California and Greater Manchester.

== Music ==
On December 17, 2013, it was announced that Marc Shaiman had composed the music for the film.

== Release ==
The first trailer for the film was released on May 9, 2014.

Released on July 25, 2014, the film earned $4.6 million in its opening weekend. Over its 10-week run, And So It Goes earned a gross in the U.S. of $15.2 million and a gross in other markets of $10.3 million for a total box-office of $25.4 million, against a production budget of $18 million, not including marketing costs.

== Reception ==
And So It Goes received negative reviews from critics. On Rotten Tomatoes, it has an approval rating of 16% based on 86 reviews with the consensus: "And So It Goes aims for comedy, but with two talented actors stuck in a half-hearted effort from a once-mighty filmmaker, it ends in unintentional tragedy". On Metacritic, it has a weighted average score of 38 out 100 based on 31 reviews, indicating "generally unfavorable" reviews. Audiences surveyed by CinemaScore gave the film a grade B+ on scale of A to F.

Film critic Leonard Maltin gave the film a positive review, saying the film "offers juicy leading roles to stars Michael Douglas and Diane Keaton." Christy Lemire of Roger Ebert.com also commended the caliber of Douglas' and Keaton's performances, but gave the film 1.5 stars for its storyline, saying: "Nothing here is a spoiler. The outcome is evident from the poster alone". A review in The Washington Post review credits "the film's most alive moments" to Keaton, who channels her Annie Hall character in both her wardrobe and her singing jazz ballads in a local pub. While a review in The Guardian is happy to see "retirement-age characters" being featured in a film, it criticizes the "banal" plot, saying: "the story structure is so fake and so plodding". Film critic Richard Corliss also gave the film a negative review, saying: "And So It Goes may touch the frayed heartstrings of some older viewers, but it's pretty bad — the failed attempt to Heimlich a venerable movie genre."
