= No Escape (2015 film) =

2015 film by John Erick Dowdle

- Theatrical release poster
- Directed by: John Erick Dowdle
- Written by: John Erick Dowdle; Drew Dowdle
- Produced by: Mitchel Litvak; David Lancaster; Drew Dowdle
- Starring: Owen Wilson; Lake Bell; Sterling Jerins; Claire Geare; Pierce Brosnan
- Cinematography: Léo Hinstin
- Edited by: Elliot Greenberg
- Music by: Marco Beltrami; Buck Sanders
- Production companies: Brothers Dowdle Productions; Bold Films; Living Films
- Distributed by: The Weinstein Company
- Release dates: August 17, 2015 (Los Angeles); August 26, 2015 (United States)
- Running time: 103 minutes (Original Release); 123 minutes (Extended Uncut)
- Country: United States
- Languages: English; Khmer
- Budget: $5 million
- Box office: $54.4 million

No Escape is a 2015 American action thriller film directed by John Erick Dowdle, who co-wrote the screenplay with his brother, Drew Dowdle. The film stars Owen Wilson, Lake Bell, and Pierce Brosnan, and tells the story of an American expat engineer trapped with his family in Cambodia during a violent uprising.

The movie was filmed in Thailand in the Chiang Mai and Lampang tourist-friendly North regions, and while the country's name was not explicitly stated, they used the Khmer script as well as a mention to Kampuchea Krom, implying that the film might take place in a fictionalized version of Cambodia. The only country mentioned in the film, as a safe haven, is Vietnam.

The film was subsequently banned in Cambodia; it also received mixed to negative reviews from critics.

The film was released on August 26, 2015, by The Weinstein Company. It had special sneak previews in the Philippines on August 16 and 17, 2015, as well as multiple pre-screenings throughout the United States before its official release.

== Plot ==
In an unnamed Southeast Asian country, the Prime Minister closes a deal with a representative of Cardiff, an American company specializing in water systems. After the representative leaves, a group of armed rebels initiate a coup d'état and assassinate the Prime Minister.

Seventeen hours earlier, Jack Dwyer, a new Cardiff employee, is already airborne en route to the country with his wife Annie and their young daughters Lucy and Briegel "Beeze", where they meet British traveller Hammond. 11 hours later after touchdown Hammond and his local friend, nicknamed Kenny Rogers, give the Dwyers a ride to their hotel.

The next morning, Jack leaves the hotel to buy a newspaper and inadvertently finds himself in the middle of a confrontation between armed protesters and riot police. The two forces clash violently as Jack makes his escape, and the protestors gain the upper hand. Jack witnesses rebels executing an American outside his hotel. A rebel soldier then spots Jack, forcing him to quickly climb a fire escape and enter the hotel through a window. The rebels break through the main hotel entrance and begin slaughtering the staff and guests.

Jack makes it back to the room but learns that Lucy is downstairs in the swimming pool. He goes back down to get her just as the rebels force their way into the pool area, Jack returns with Lucy and they all make their way up to the roof to join the other surviving guests. Hundreds of rebels are gathered at the base of the hotel chanting "Blood for water", and Jack learns the rebels are protesting against foreign corporations' control of their water supply. Suddenly, a helicopter appears holding armed rebels who immediately open fire. The Dwyers run for cover as the helicopter becomes entangled in electrical wires and crashes. As another group of rebels break through the barricaded door onto the roof, Jack and his family jump onto the roof of another building next to the hotel.

The Dwyers hide in the building until nightfall. Annie finds a map of the city and decides they need to make their way to the American embassy. They take clothes from the dead office workers to disguise themselves as locals and then make their way through the anarchy ridden streets on a stolen moped. Upon arriving at the embassy, they discover it has been overrun and seemingly deserted. A small group of rebels spot the family and they flee, taking shelter in a Buddhist shrine garden nearby.

The rebels enter the compound and, as Jack attempts to take one of their guns, Annie comes out of hiding to draw attention away from him. Jack tries to shoot the leader, Samnang, but the gun is unloaded. The rebels then beat and restrain Jack as Samnang prepares to rape Annie. Hammond and Kenny arrive and shoot most of the rebels, though Samnang escapes. The two men then take the Dwyers to a nearby safe house; Jack asks Hammond if he is 'British CIA', he responds, "something like that." Hammond had been tasked with convincing poor governments to make expensive infrastructure deals with Western companies. Unable to repay their debts, the companies would then be able to control the poorer governments, leaving the citizens to rebel in anger.

Hammond tells Jack they must get to the nearby river where they can float downstream to the Vietnamese border and claim their right of asylum. During the night, the group is attacked by rebels from a nearby guard tower; Kenny is killed and Hammond is severely wounded. Hammond then sacrifices himself to stop a rebel following them in a truck. Near the riverbank, Annie hides with the children while Jack finds a fisherman, and trades his watch and shoes for a boat. Samnang reappears leading another small group. They capture Jack and prepare to execute him. Lucy runs to her father and Samnang catches her; he puts a gun in her hands and another to her head, ordering her to kill Jack or he will kill her. Annie attacks the group, bludgeoning Samnang to death with an oar. Jack takes the gun from Lucy and kills the remaining rebels.

The Dwyers paddle downriver toward the Vietnamese border. They are spotted by another group of rebels, but since the border is in sight, they keep paddling. The Vietnamese border guards challenge them, ordering them not to cross the border, but as soon the boat crosses the border marker, the Vietnamese border guards turn their guns on the rebels, warning them that any acts of aggression will be interpreted as an act of war; the rebels relent and walk away. The Dwyers embrace one another, having finally survived their ordeal, and Jack later recovers in a local hospital.

== Cast ==
- Owen Wilson as Jack Dwyer, a new Cardiff employee (formerly American civil engineer) and Annie's husband
- Lake Bell as Annie Dwyer, Jack's wife
- Sterling Jerins as Lucy Dwyer, Jack and Annie's older daughter
- Claire Geare as Briegel "Beeze" Dwyer, Jack and Annie's younger daughter
- Pierce Brosnan as Hammond, an implied British government operative
- Sahajak Boonthanakit as Kenny, a local driver running a Kenny Rogers-themed taxi service, also Hammond's associate
- Thanawut Ketsaro as Samnang, leader of the violent rebels

== Production ==
=== Development ===
In 2012, it was reported that Owen Wilson would star in an action film called The Coup, and the tone of the film was described as akin to Taken (2009), centering on an American family that moves to Southeast Asia and finds themselves "embroiled in a violent coup where rebels mercilessly attack the city." Later, during the Cannes Film Festival, it was reported that Pierce Brosnan had joined the project, with his role being a "mysterious and ultimately heroic government operative," a nod to his role as James Bond. John Erick Dowdle, known for several horror films, and who wrote the script with his brother, Drew Dowdle, was set to direct the film. The two brothers based the script on a near-miss of political upheaval when the Dowdle family were going on a trip to Thailand, in real life. John explains, "Right before we got to Thailand, a coup overthrew the prime minister. There'd been no previous warning. There was a feeling of anxiety in the air. So I started thinking about that. If it went badly, what would I do?" Michelle Monaghan had joined the cast, playing the wife of Wilson's character.

In August 2013, it was reported that Bold Films would finance the film, replacing Crime Scene Pictures. Later that year, it was reported that Lake Bell had replaced Monaghan, and her character was said to be named Annie Dwyer, described as a beloved woman appearing to have the perfect family life. Principal photography began on October 31, 2013 in Thailand. After Thailand's military staged a coup in May 2014, the movie was retitled from "The Coup" to "No Escape".

=== Filming ===
No Escape was filmed in Chiang Mai, Thailand. Principal photography began on October 31, 2013, with Thai-based production company, Living Films, facilitating the shoot. "The producers of the film had a wide choice of countries in which they could have based this production," said Living Films founder and executive director Chris Lowenstein. "The fact that they chose Thailand is a great testament to the skills of the Thai crews and the resources that Thailand offers. We are delighted to help bring this project to the screen." Sierra/Affinity handled international sales of the film. Brosnan joined the crew in December after finishing his work on How to Make Love Like an Englishman, moving to Cambodia where production was held.

On June 10, 2014, it was announced that the film would be released on March 6, 2015. On February 6, 2015, it was announced that the film was retitled No Escape and its release was delayed to September 2, 2015. Its release date was changed again to August 26, 2015.

The film was approved for release in Thailand after the film-makers agreed not to identify the country where it was filmed or to portray it negatively. In an interview for The Straits Times, co-writer Drew Dowdle explained, "We were very careful not to make it Thailand in the movie, so there was no Thai language used... None of the signage is Thai and most of the language that the native population is speaking is a combination of Laotian, hill-tribe languages and other languages." The film-makers were also instructed not to use images of the Thai monarchy and to "never show the king or the colour yellow because that's the colour of the king". Director John Dowdle added that they were also told "no Buddhas... don't do anything bad in front of a Buddha."

== Reception ==
=== Box office ===
No Escape grossed $27.3 million in North America and $27.1 million in other territories for a worldwide total of $54.4 million, against a budget of $5 million. The film grossed $1.2 million on its opening day and $8.1 million in its opening weekend, finishing 4th at the box office.

=== Critical response ===
Review aggregation website Rotten Tomatoes gives the film a rating of 46% based on 157 reviews and an average rating of 4.98/10. The site's critical consensus reads, "No Escape's talented cast and taut B-movie thrills are unfortunately offset by its one-dimensional characters and uncomfortably retrograde worldview." On Metacritic, the film has a score of 38 out of 100, based on 33 critics, indicating "generally unfavorable reviews". The film received an average "B+" CinemaScore from audiences, on an A+ to F scale.

Toronto Star's Peter Howell questioned the film for its "lack of moral considerations", but overall praised it as being suspenseful and "great entertainment." The Washington Post's Stephanie Merry wrote that "every Asian character is either a ruthless murderer or anonymous collateral damage." Seattle Times' Moira Macdonald criticized No Escape as offensive and concluded: "Just like the Dwyer family, I found myself looking for escape; you might, too." Rogerebert.com's Peter Sobczynski criticized No Escape for its "borderline xenophobia", but ultimately panned the film for John Erick Dowdle's film direction and "unintentionally comedic" slow motion scenes. He concluded that it was "one of the most unpleasant films of the year".

=== Ban in Cambodia ===
After trailers for the film were released, a social uproar occurred in Cambodia over the use of upside down Khmer lettering on the police shields. The Ministry of Culture and Fine Arts has since prohibited the film from being shown in Cambodia. Sin Chanchaya, director of the Department of Film said that the decision to ban the film had come solely based on the trailer and was also informed that in order to receive permission to shoot in Thailand, where several real coups d'état had just taken place, the production team had to arrange that no scenes would directly identify Thailand as the setting. Chanchaya also said that the Cambodian Ministry had approached the film producers to edit the Khmer lettering out of the film but they had not replied by the time of the decision.

"When people see that movie, they will think that our country is incredibly violent...The characters are wearing Cambodian clothes, and made to look like the Cambodian military." (He added that the outcry on Facebook encouraged the Ministry of Culture to ban the movie.) — Sin Chanchaya, director of the department of film at the Ministry of Culture.
