= Dark Places (2015 film) =

2015 film directed by Gilles Paquet-Brenner

- International release poster
- Directed by: Gilles Paquet-Brenner
- Screenplay by: Gilles Paquet-Brenner
- Based on: Dark Places by Gillian Flynn
- Produced by: Stéphane Marsil; Azim Bolkiah; Matthew Rhodes; Cathy Schulman; Charlize Theron; Rob Weston
- Starring: Charlize Theron; Christina Hendricks; Nicholas Hoult; Chloë Grace Moretz; Corey Stoll; Tye Sheridan; Sterling Jerins; Andrea Roth; Sean Bridgers
- Cinematography: Barry Ackroyd
- Edited by: Douglas Crise; Billy Fox
- Music by: BT; Gregory Tripi
- Production companies: Denver and Delilah Productions; Hugo Productions; Mandalay Pictures
- Distributed by: Mars Distribution (France); A24 (United States)
- Release dates: April 8, 2015 (France); August 7, 2015 (United States)
- Running time: 112 minutes
- Countries: France; United States
- Language: English
- Budget: $11.9 million
- Box office: $5.1 million

Dark Places is a 2015 mystery film written and directed by Gilles Paquet-Brenner, based on Gillian Flynn's 2009 novel of the same name and stars Charlize Theron, Christina Hendricks, Nicholas Hoult, and Chloë Grace Moretz.

The film was released in France on April 8, 2015, and in the United States on August 7, 2015, by A24. The film received mostly negative reviews.

== Plot ==
In 1985 in rural Kinnakee, Kansas, 8-year-old Libby Day is the sole survivor after her mother and older sisters are murdered. Responding to the police's leading questions, she says that her teenage brother, Ben, committed the crime.

In the present, Libby has made a living from donations sent by strangers to "the little girl on the news"; donations are less frequent now that she is an adult and is low on money. Lyle Wirth approaches Libby to make a personal appearance at his "True Crime" club. She reluctantly agrees to go for $700.

In 1985 – prior to the murders – Ben comes to the breakfast table with dyed black hair. He has a tense relationship with his mother, Patty, and his eldest sister, Michelle, who taunts Ben about being a loner. Ben hangs out with Trey Teepano, a Satanist bookie. Meanwhile, their mother Patty learns that her farm is being foreclosed on, despite her best efforts.

In the present, most of the members of Wirth's club believe that Ben is innocent as his conviction was based entirely on Libby's testimony. Though she still believes in Ben's guilt, Libby agrees to work with the club in return for much-needed money. Urged by Wirth to visit Ben in prison, Libby's curiosity about what motivated him to kill their family prods her to keep researching the case.

In 1985, Ben plans to run away with his pregnant girlfriend Diondra. Meanwhile, some young girls have accused Ben of molesting them. When Patty learns of the charges, she visits the main accuser, Krissi Cates, whose father is irate and wants to harm Ben. Patty is distraught and feels that she has failed her kids.

At home, Runner, the estranged, alcoholic father of Patty's kids, is waiting to ask Patty for money to leave town; he owes Trey the bookie more than he can repay. Runner attempts to rip Patty's heirloom ruby necklace from her neck but, unable to do so, intimidates her and steals money from her wallet.

In the present, Libby locates Runner in an abandoned factory where he lives with other homeless addicts and learns of Diondra's pregnancy from him. She also locates Krissi Cates, who eventually confesses to inventing the molestation accusations against Ben.

In 1985, Patty learns of a possible answer to her problems and meets with a stranger in the park late at night. The stranger is later revealed as Calvin Diehl, a serial killer known as the Angel of Debt, who murders people so that their families can collect on their life insurance policies. Unable to see another solution, Patty goes home and hides some money for Diehl as payment.

At the same time, Diondra learns about the accusations against Ben and convinces him to flee with her immediately. They go to Ben's house to steal some money, but Michelle overhears them and threatens to tell Patty. Diondra suddenly attacks Michelle, choking her. Meanwhile, Diehl has also entered the house and stabs Patty in the hallway. When her middle daughter, Debby, rushes from the bedroom seeking help for Michelle, Diehl grabs the family shotgun and kills the young girl. The shot distracts Ben from his efforts to defend Michelle, whom Diondra strangles while Ben investigates the noise.

In the present, Libby finds Diondra and Crystal, the daughter she had with Ben. Libby finds her mother's ruby necklace in Diondra's bathroom and realizes she is in danger. Crystal attacks her, but Libby escapes. She then learns Diehl's involvement from Wirth, whose club has been working on the Angel of Debt case.

Libby visits Ben again in prison and they apologize to each other. She realizes he was trying to protect his unborn daughter by taking the blame for their family's murders. A news report confirms that Diondra has been arrested. Libby returns to the family farm where she grew up and Ben is exonerated and released from prison. Libby states that she does not intend to press charges against Crystal, who is yet to be found, as she understands her actions.

== Cast ==
- Charlize Theron as Libby Day
  - Sterling Jerins as young Libby Day
- Nicholas Hoult as Lyle Wirth
- Christina Hendricks as Patty Day
- Corey Stoll as Ben Day
  - Tye Sheridan as young Ben Day
- Andrea Roth as Diondra Wertzner
  - Chloë Grace Moretz as young Diondra Wertzner
- Sean Bridgers as Runner Day
- J. LaRose as Trey Teepano
  - Shannon Kook as young Trey Teepano
- Natalie Precht as Michelle Day
- Madison McGuire as Debby Day
- Jennifer Pierce Mathus as Diane
- Denise Williamson as Crystal
- Jeff Chase as Calvin Diehl
- Drea de Matteo as Krissi Cates
  - Addy Miller as young Krissi Cates
- Dan Hewitt Owens as Robert
- Glenn Morshower as Jim Jeffreys

== Production ==
Principal photography commenced in late August 2013 in Shreveport and Minden, Louisiana.

== Release ==
Dark Places was released in France on April 8, 2015. In November 2014, it was announced A24 and DirecTV Cinema had acquired rights to the film. The film began airing on DirecTV Cinema on June 18, 2015, and was released in limited release and through video on demand on August 7, 2015.

== Reception ==
=== Box office ===
The film grossed a total of $208,588 in the United States from 151 venues over the course of two weeks. Overseas, the film earned $4,882,264 for a worldwide total of $5,090,852.

=== Critical response ===
On Rotten Tomatoes, the film has an approval rating of 23% based on 82 reviews, with an average rating of 4.7/10. The site's critics' consensus reads: "Dark Places has a strong cast and bestselling source material, but none of it adds up to more than a mediocre thriller that gets tripped up on its own twists." Metacritic, which uses a weighted average, assigns a score of 39 out of 100 based on 19 critics, indicating "generally unfavorable" reviews.

Peter Bradshaw's review in The Guardian wrote, "There are moments of macabre horror here, and interesting nods to Capote’s In Cold Blood, as well as America’s satanic abuse scare and the Robin Hood Hills case", but summed up the film as "a middling screen adaptation". Katie Walsh wrote in The Chicago Tribune, "It feels like the film doesn't want to commit to either pure camp or stoic darkness, fluctuating between the two...The twists, turns and reveals in the mystery sustain interest in the film, which hops between present day to the day of the murders, interspersed with Libby's flashback of fleeing the house that night. But despite all the shocking developments, the resolution is rushed, and therefore farfetched and confounding." David Lewis, in the San Francisco Chronicle, expressed the film "could have taken us to some more interesting places."

The Observer critic Mark Kermode wrote, "Gilles Paquet-Brenner invests the split-time action with some brooding menace and the cinematographer, Barry Ackroyd, does his best to lend some urgency, even as things spiral from suspense into outright silliness." Bilge Ebiri of Vulture was complimentary of the film's use of atmosphere, but said the movie gets weighed down by its plot and structure.

Writing in the Toronto Star, Bruce DeMara gave the film a positive review, citing Theron's performance. He called the film "a reasonably suspenseful tale populated by a slew of sordid players, bringing an outsider’s view to the seamier side of middle America that actually comes across as both gritty and fresh." Peter Debruge of Variety wrote: "As heroines go, it’s refreshing to get one as complex as this: When psychologically scarred female characters do turn up in thrillers, they're usually little more than shivering victims who set a group of male cops in motion, but here, Libby does her own detective work, while Hendricks lends star power to the flashback scenes." However, he called the film as a whole "a relative disappointment". Chris Nashawaty's review in Entertainment Weekly stated Dark Places "isn’t terrible, exactly, but disappointing considering its cast and source…[It] just becomes an overstuffed, low-simmer potboiler with too many improbable detours and overly convenient twists".

== Upcoming limited television series ==
In January 2024, it was announced that Flynn would serve as co-creator, writer, and co-showrunner on a new limited series based on Dark Places for HBO.
