= Daisy Winters =

Drama film

- Film poster
- Directed by: Beth LaMure
- Screenplay by: Beth LaMure
- Produced by: Beth LaMure
- Starring: Sterling Jerins; Brooke Shields; Carrie Preston; Iwan Rheon; Nick Gore; Paul Blackthorne
- Cinematography: Shawn Maurer
- Edited by: Cari Coughlin
- Music by: Paul Grabowsky
- Production companies: Daisy Force Pictures; Hannover House; Me Jane
- Release date: October 5, 2017 (New York premiere)
- Language: English

Daisy Winters is a 2017 American independent drama film written and directed by Beth LaMure. The film follows an 11-year-old girl named Daisy Winters, played by Sterling Jerins. Daisy's mother Sandy (Brooke Shields) has been losing a fight with cancer for years. This has made Daisy obsessed with everything to do with death.

Director Beth LaMure took her own life on October 2, 2016, during the post-production phase of the film but the project was carried on by producers Jane Badler, Deborah Moore and Sean E. Demott. It premiered on October 5, 2017, reaching public theatres on December 1, 2017. Rotten Tomatoes gave a rating of 60% positive based on five critic's reviews.

== Cast ==
- Sterling Jerins as Daisy Winters
- Brooke Shields as Sandy Winters
- Carrie Preston as Aunt Margaret
- Iwan Rheon as Doug
- Paul Blackthorne as Robert Stergen
- Nick Gore as Jackson Kumar

== Background ==
From the time that LaMure finished writing Daisy Winters to the time that it was produced it took 13 years to be put together. LaMure placed a lot of emphasis on having a strong female cast to support her feminist stance and wanted to make up for the lack of young, adventurous and strong female leads in the film industry

In 2003, it was reported that Emma Roberts and Rachel Weisz were cast in the lead roles, and John Wells and Peyton Reed were producing. Filming was expected to begin a week from this announcement in Vancouver, but no further development had been reported, and neither Wells nor Reed were involved in the final product.

It took LaMure a long time to find her idea of the strong female lead that she was looking for, taking time with her casting was important for her as Sterling Jerins auditioned three years before filming took place.

Despite raising awareness for topics of depression and suicide in the film, LaMure took her own life towards the latter end of post-production. Production was continued by producers Jane Badler, Deborah Moore and Sean E. Demott. Sterling Jerins commented that "it was one of the saddest moments of my life" after having found out about her director's passing.

== Cinematography ==
Shawn Maurer was in charge of cinematography and focused on "warm and bright" lighting to give a childish essence to the film. He used handheld camerawork throughout the scenes displaying fear.

Final Cut Pro X was used to edit the film, primarily because of its low cost.

== Critical reception ==
As of February 2020, 60% of the 5 critic's reviews compiled by Rotten Tomatoes are positive, and have an average score of 4 out of 10, with no consensus. In her review for the Los Angeles Times, Kimber Myers criticized the plot as unconvincing and contrived with an overly pat ending while praising the performances, technical proficiency and production values. She commented: " ... other than its performances everything it offers feels inorganic". Amy Nicholson, in her review for Variety, praised the performance by Jerins and the cinematography while criticizing the character of Doug as unconvincing and out of place. The review concluded: " ... even in its strangest moments, there's something refreshing in LaMure's insistence that human behaviour does not fit in tidy boxes and that kids are stronger than adults expect". Jeffrey M Anderson for Common Sense Media rated the film two stars from five, criticizing the direction as lifeless, awkward and detached with thin characterizations apart from the central character, praising the performance of Jerins. Bob Strauss of The Los Angeles Daily News praised Jerins' performance but criticized the other performances.
