= Dark Places (Flynn novel) =

2009 mystery novel by Gillian Flynn

- Front cover of US first edition
- Author: Gillian Flynn
- Cover artist: Lynne Amft
- Language: English
- Genre: Mystery
- Publisher: Shaye Areheart Books
- Publication date: 5 May 2009 (1st edition)
- Publication place: United States
- Media type: Print (hardcover)
- Pages: 349 (hardcover edition)
- ISBN: 978-0-307-34156-3
- OCLC: 249137284

Dark Places is a mystery novel by Gillian Flynn published in 2009. The novel deals with class issues in rural America, intense poverty and the Satanic cult hysteria that swept the United States in the 1980s. Dark Places was shortlisted for the Crime Writers' Association Ian Fleming Steel Dagger Award and won Dark Scribe Magazine's Black Quill Award for Dark Genre Novel of the Year. It was also listed on The New York Times Best Seller list for hardcover fiction for two consecutive weeks. A film adaptation of the novel starring Charlize Theron was released on August 7, 2015.

== Plot ==
Libby Day, the novel's narrator and protagonist, is the sole survivor of a massacre in Kinnakee, Kansas, a fictional rural town. On January 3, 1985, somewhere around 2 A.M., Libby overhears the murders of her 10-year-old sister Michelle, 9-year-old sister Debby, and mother, Patty, in what appears to be a Satanic cult ritual. Libby escapes through a window, experiences severe frostbite that leaves her with missing fingers and toes, and later testifies in court against her teenage brother, Ben.

Twenty-four years after the massacre, Libby, in need of money, meets with a group of amateur investigators led by a man named Lyle Wirth who believe that her brother is innocent of the crime. At their coaxing, she meets her brother, Ben for the first time in jail. She also meets with her father Runner, who is now homeless and is constantly asking for money; a girl named Krissi Cates, a stripper who accused Ben of molesting her as a child; Trey Teepano, a former acquaintance of Ben's who was accused of being a Satanist as a teenager; and Diondra Wertzner, Ben's former girlfriend who may have had a hand in the massacre. Through her investigation, Libby learns of her brother's secrets and how the murders unfolded that evening.

Interspersed with the modern day investigation are flashbacks to the day of the massacre. These flashbacks are told from the points of view of Libby's mother, Patty, and her convicted brother, Ben. Patty's viewpoints discuss the difficulties of trying to keep the family farm while raising four children alone; Ben tells the story of a troubled teenager as he falls in with a bad crowd. These viewpoints paint a picture of a grim life of desperate poverty, marital abuse, and abandonment that characterize life on the farm prior to the murders.

== Reception ==
Dark Places was listed on The New York Times Best Seller list for hardcover fiction on May 29, 2009, where it was ranked #15 for the week ending May 23. It was included in an expanded listing of the top 35 best sellers that appeared only online (Only the top ten best sellers are included in the print edition). It remained on the best seller list for two weeks; the June 5 listing of Hardcover Best Sellers ranked Dark Places #25 for the week ending May 30.

IndieBound, an independent booksellers section of the American Booksellers Association, included Dark Places in their May 2009 "Indie Next List" of recommendations by independent sellers.

== Awards and nominations ==
The novel was nominated for Dark Scribe Magazine's Black Quill Award in the category of Dark Genre Novel of the Year on November 29, 2009. The award, which recognizes a "novel-length work of horror, suspense, or thriller from [a] mainstream publisher," was awarded to Gillian Flynn on February 7, 2010. Dark Places was the Editor's Pick for the category, where it was one of six nominees.

== Film adaptation ==
In 2015, the novel was adapted into a film directed by Gilles Paquet-Brenner. The cast includes Charlize Theron, Nicholas Hoult, Christina Hendricks, Drea de Matteo, Chloë Grace Moretz, and Sean Bridgers. The film was released on August 7, 2015.

== Upcoming limited television series ==
In January 2024, it was announced that Flynn would serve as co-creator, writer, and co-showrunner on a new limited series based on Dark Places for HBO.
