= Gillian Flynn =

American writer (born 1971)

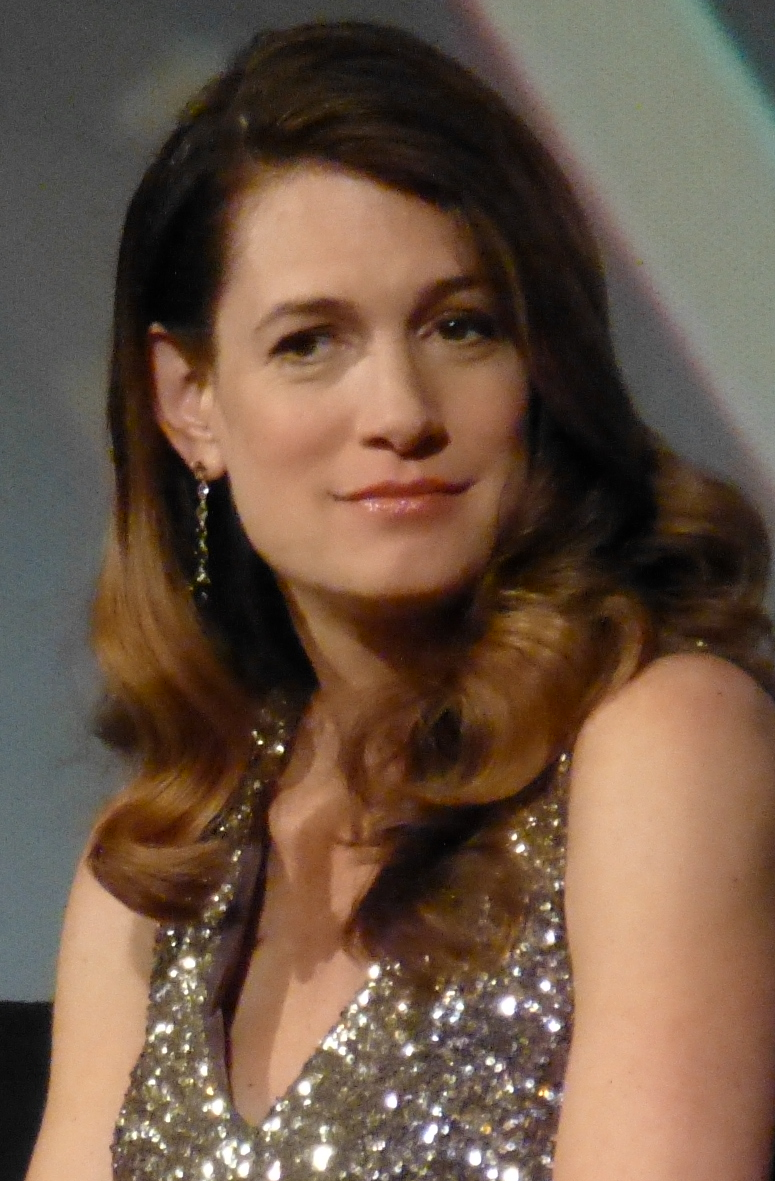
- Flynn at the 52nd New York Film Festival, September 2014
- Born: February 24, 1971 (age 55); Kansas City, Missouri, U.S.
- Education: University of Kansas (BFA); Northwestern University (MSJ)
- Occupations: Author; screenwriter; showrunner; producer
- Spouse: Brett Nolan (m. 2007)
- Children: 2
- Writing career
- Period: 2006–present
- Genres: Fiction; thriller; mystery
- Notable works: Gone Girl; Sharp Objects
- Website: gillian-flynn.com

Gillian Schieber Flynn (/ˈɡɪliən/; born February 24, 1971) is an American author, screenwriter, and producer, best known for her thriller and mystery novels Sharp Objects (2006), Dark Places (2009), and Gone Girl (2012). Her works have been published in 40 languages, and by 2016, Gone Girl had sold over 15 million copies worldwide.

== Early life and education ==
Flynn was born in Kansas City, Missouri, and grew up in the Coleman Highlands neighborhood. Both of her parents were educators: her mother, Judith Ann (née Schieber), was a reading-comprehension professor, and her father, Edwin Matthew Flynn, taught film. Flynn has an older brother, Travis, who works as a railroad machinist. She has described herself as a "painfully shy" child, finding refuge in reading and writing. Her interest in storytelling was further cultivated by her father's love of horror films.

As a young woman, Flynn worked assorted jobs, including selling honey-baked ham and giving out yoghurt samples in the mall, dressed as "a tuxedo-clad cone." She attended Bishop Miege High School, graduating in 1989, and went on to earn undergraduate degrees in English and journalism from the University of Kansas.

After spending two years in California writing at a trade magazine for human resources professionals, Flynn moved to Chicago. She attended Northwestern University's Medill School of Journalism, where she completed a master's degree in 1997. Initially aspiring to become a crime reporter, she ultimately chose to pursue a career in creative writing.

== Career ==
After graduating from Northwestern, Flynn worked freelance briefly at U.S. News & World Report before joining Entertainment Weekly in 1998 as a feature writer, eventually becoming a television critic. She was made redundant in December 2008. Flynn credits her years in journalism with helping to hone her writing skills, stating that journalism taught her the discipline of writing without waiting for inspiration. She said, "I could not have written a novel if I hadn't been a journalist first, because it taught me that there's no muse that's going to come down and bestow upon you the mood to write. You just have to do it. I'm definitely not precious."

Flynn's portrayal of complex, morally ambiguous, and often unflattering female characters has drawn criticism from some critics, who have accused her of misogyny. However, Flynn identifies as a feminist, and has defended her choice to write female characters who defy conventional expectations of women as inherently nurturing or morally virtuous. She states, "the one thing that really frustrates me is this idea that women are innately good, innately nurturing." To her, people will dismiss "trampy, vampy, bitchy types – but there's still a big pushback against the idea that women can be just pragmatically evil, bad, and selfish."

In 2021, Flynn was appointed to lead a new book imprint – Gillian Flynn Books – for the independent publisher Zando. As of May 2025, she was working on her fourth novel, another psychological thriller, to be published by Penguin Random House.

=== Books ===
As of 2025, Flynn had published three novels and one short story.

While working at Entertainment Weekly, she wrote her first novel, Sharp Objects (2006), a psychological thriller about a reporter investigating a series of murders in her hometown. Partly inspired by Dennis Lehane's Mystic River, the book was shortlisted for the Mystery Writers of America's Edgar for Best First Novel, and won the Crime Writers' Association's New Blood and Ian Fleming Steel Dagger. Sharp Objects was later adapted into a celebrated 2018 television miniseries starring Amy Adams.

Flynn's second novel, Dark Places (2009), follows a woman who begins to question whether her incarcerated brother was truly responsible for the murder of their family during the Satanic panic era of the 1980s, when she was a child. The novel garnered positive reviews, though its 2015 feature film adaptation, starring Charlize Theron, was criticized as "dull" and "implausible." Flynn made a cameo appearance in the film. As of 2024, Flynn is developing a limited series for HBO based on the book, where she will serve as co-creator, writer, and co-showrunner.

Her third novel, Gone Girl (2012), centers on Nick Dunne, a small-town Missouri creative writing professor, and his wife Amy Elliott, who mysteriously disappears on their fifth wedding anniversary. Gone Girl topped The New York Times Bestseller list for eight weeks, with over two million copies sold by the end of 2012. Flynn adapted the novel into a successful 2014 film directed by David Fincher, starring Ben Affleck and Rosamund Pike.

Flynn's short story The Grownup won the Edgar Award for Best Short Story. Originally published under the title What Do You Do? in the 2014 anthology Rogues, edited by George R. R. Martin and Gardner Dozois, it was later released as a standalone publication in 2015. The narrative follows a sex worker turned fake psychic, hired by a woman to cleanse her Victorian home, which is troubled by a deteriorating marriage and a disturbing stepson.

=== Comic book short story ===
An avid reader of comic and graphic novels when she was a child, Flynn collaborated with illustrator Dave Gibbons and wrote a comic book short story called Masks. Part of the anthology series Dark Horse Presents, it was published by Dark Horse Comics in February 2015.

=== Screen adaptations ===
==== Television ====
Alongside Marti Noxon, Flynn co-wrote and served as an executive producer for HBO's 2018 adaptation of Sharp Objects, for which she received nominations for the Primetime Emmy and the Writers Guild of America Award.

In 2014, it was announced that Flynn would write the scripts for an HBO adaptation of the British series Utopia. Initially, the HBO series was to be directed and executive produced by David Fincher, but budget issues between Fincher and the network led to its cancellation in 2015. The project was later revived by Amazon, which ordered it to series with a 2020 release. Flynn wrote all eight episodes and served as the project's showrunner. Utopia premiered on Prime Video on September 25, 2020, drawing mixed reviews. The series was canceled in November 2020 after one season.

In 2025 it was shared that Flynn started work on an upcoming HBO limited series adapting Dark Places.

==== Film ====
Flynn wrote the screenplay for the 2014 film adaptation of Gone Girl, directed by David Fincher, for which she won the Critics' Choice Movie Award for Best Adapted Screenplay and which was nominated for the Writers Guild of America awards, as well as the Golden Globe, and BAFTA Award for Best Adapted Screenplay.

She also co-wrote, along with filmmaker Steve McQueen, the film adaptation of the ITV series Widows, Starring Viola Davis, Elizabeth Debicki, Michelle Rodriguez, Cynthia Erivo, Colin Farrell, Brian Tyree Henry, Daniel Kaluuya, and Liam Neeson. The film was released in November 2018 to high praise from movie critics.

== Upcoming projects ==
Flynn is working on her fourth novel, which is set to be published by Penguin Random House. As discussed in the Chanel Connects podcast in June 2022, Flynn is currently writing the film adaptation for her short story, The Grownup.

She is also developing a limited series for HBO based on her novel Dark Places. Flynn retains the rights to the novel, with Brett Johnson and Guerrin Gardner joining her as co-showrunners, co-creators, and writers. Furthermore, she is collaborating with Tim Burton on a remake of Nathan H. Juran's classic Attack of the 50 Foot Woman film for Warner Bros.

== Personal life ==
Flynn married lawyer Brett Nolan in 2007, when she was 36, having met him during graduate school at Northwestern. Their relationship developed in their thirties. They have two children: a son, born in 2010, and a daughter, born in 2014. The family resides in Chicago.

== Awards and nominations ==
=== Literature ===
Year	Award	Category	Work	Result	Ref
2007	Crime Writers' Association	Gold Dagger	Sharp Objects	Shortlisted	
2007	Crime Writers' Association	Ian Fleming Steel Dagger	Sharp Objects	Won	
2007	Crime Writers' Association	New Blood Dagger	Sharp Objects	Won	
2007	Mystery Writers of America	Edgar Award for Best First Novel	Sharp Objects	Shortlisted	
2009	Crime Writers' Association	Ian Fleming Steel Dagger	Dark Places	Shortlisted	
2010	Dark Scribe magazine	Dark Genre Novel of the Year	Dark Places	Won	
2013	Mystery Writers of America	Edgar Award for Best Novel	Gone Girl	Shortlisted	
2013	Women's Prize for Fiction	Women's Prize for Fiction	Gone Girl	Longlisted	
2015	Mystery Writers of America	Edgar Award for Best Short Story	The Grownup	Won	

=== Film ===
Year	Award	Category	Work	Result	Ref
2014	Austin Film Critics Association Award	Best Adapted Screenplay	Gone Girl	Won	
2014	Awards Circuit Community Award	Best Adapted Screenplay	Gone Girl	Won	
2014	Black Film Critics Circle Award	Best Adapted Screenplay	Gone Girl	Won	
2014	Chicago Film Critics Association Award	Best Adapted Screenplay	Gone Girl	Won	
2014	Florida Film Critics Circle Award	Screenwriter of the Year Award	Gone Girl	Won	
2014	IndieWire Critics Poll	Best Screenplay	Gone Girl	Nominated	
2014	Golden Schmoes Award	Best Screenplay of the Year	Gone Girl	Won	
2014	Hollywood Film Award	Best Screenplay	Gone Girl	Won	
2014	NewNowNext Award	Best New Screenwriter	Gone Girl	Won	
2014	Online Film Critics Society Award	Best Adapted Screenplay	Gone Girl	Won	
2014	Phoenix Critics Circle Award	Best Screenplay	Gone Girl	Nominated	
2014	Phoenix Film Critics Society Award	Best Screenplay Adapted from Another Medium	Gone Girl	Won	
2014	San Diego Film Critics Society Award	Best Adapted Screenplay	Gone Girl	Won	
2014	San Francisco Bay Area Film Critics Circle Award	Best Adapted Screenplay	Gone Girl	Nominated	
2014	Screenwriters Choice Awards, Online	Best Adapted Screenplay	Gone Girl	Won	
2014	Southeastern Film Critics Association Award	Best Adapted Screenplay	Gone Girl	Won	
2014	St. Louis Film Critics Association Award	Best Adapted Screenplay	Gone Girl	Won	
2014	Washington D.C. Area Film Critics Association Award	Best Adapted Screenplay	Gone Girl	Won	
2015			Gone Girl		
2015	Alliance of Women Film Journalists Award	Best Woman Screenwriter	Gone Girl	Won	
2015	Alliance of Women Film Journalists Award	Best Writing, Adapted Screenplay	Gone Girl	Won	
2015	BAFTA Award	Best Adapted Screenplay	Gone Girl	Nominated	
2015	Central Ohio Film Critics Association Award	Best Adapted Screenplay	Gone Girl	Nominated	
2015	Cinema Bloggers Award, Portugal	Best Screenplay	Gone Girl	Won	
2015	Critics' Choice Movie Award	Best Adapted Screenplay	Gone Girl	Won	
2015	Denver Film Critics Society Award	Best Adapted Screenplay	Gone Girl	Nominated	
2015	Georgia Film Critics Association Award	Best Adapted Screenplay	Gone Girl	Won	
2015	Gold Derby Award	Adapted Screenplay	Gone Girl	Won	
2015	Golden Globe Award	Best Screenplay	Gone Girl	Nominated	
2015	Italian Online Movie Award	Best Adapted Screenplay	Gone Girl	Nominated	
2015	International Cinephile Society Award	Best Adapted Screenplay	Gone Girl	Nominated	
2015	International Online Cinema Award	Best Adapted Screenplay	Gone Girl	Won	
2015	North Carolina Film Critics Association Award	Best Adapted Screenplay	Gone Girl	Nominated	
2015	Oklahoma Film Critics Circle Award	Best Adapted Screenplay	Gone Girl	Won	
2015	Online Film & Television Association Award	Best Feature Debut	Gone Girl	Won	
2015	Satellite Award	Best Adapted Screenplay	Gone Girl	Nominated	
2015	Seattle Film Critics Society Award	Best Screenplay, Adapted	Gone Girl	Nominated	
2015	USC Scripter Award	USC Scripter Award	Gone Girl	Nominated	
2015	Writers Guild of America Award	Best Adapted Screenplay	Gone Girl	Nominated	
2018	Greater Western New York Film Critics Association Award	Best Adapted Screenplay	Widows	Nominated	
2018	Online Association of Female Film Critics Award	Best Adapted Screenplay	Widows	Nominated	
2018	St. Louis Film Critics Association Award	Best Adapted Screenplay	Widows	Nominated	
2019	Black Reel Award	Outstanding Screenplay, Adapted or Original	Widows	Nominated	
2019	Columbus Film Critics Association Award	Best Adapted Screenplay	Widows	Nominated	
2019	London Critics Circle Film Award	Screenwriter of the Year	Widows	Nominated	
2019	Online Film Critics Society Award	Best Adapted Screenplay	Widows	Nominated	
2020	Gold Derby Award	Best Screenplay of the Decade	Gone Girl	Nominated	

=== TV ===
Year	Award	Category	Work	Result	Ref
2018	Gotham Independent Film Award	Breakthrough Series – Long Form	Sharp Objects	Nominated	
2018	USC Scripter Award	USC Scripter Award (shared with Marti Noxon; for the episode "Vanish")	Sharp Objects	Nominated	
2019	Producers Guild of America Award	Best Limited Series Television	Sharp Objects	Nominated	
2019	Primetime Emmy Award	Outstanding Limited or Anthology Series	Sharp Objects	Nominated	
2019	Writers Guild of America Award for Television Award	Long Form – Adapted	Sharp Objects	Nominated	

== Published works ==
=== Fiction ===
- Sharp Objects (2006)
- Dark Places (2009)
- Gone Girl (2012)
- "Masks" (comic book short story) (2014)
- "The Grownup" (short story) (2014)

=== Non-fiction ===
- "Gillian Flynn: A Howl". Time. Ideas. Dec 6, 2017. "The outrages and allegations flash through my brain like a nasty, ludicrous slide show of twisted male power."
- "Gillian Flynn on Emma Thompson Reading The Turn of the Screw". The New York Times. Audiobooks. May 18, 2016. "The Turn of the Screw is one of the most chilling ghost stories ever, largely because it is so deliciously elusive."
- "Be kind to people dressed as food ("Costume drama")". The New Yorker. Work for Hire. Oct 10, 2016. p. 78. "In the late eighties, my job involved going out in public dressed as a tuxedoed dairy product. Children ran from me."
- "I Was Not a Nice Little Girl". Powell’s Books. Jul 17, 2015. "I was not a nice little girl. My favorite summertime hobby was stunning ants and feeding them to spiders. My preferred indoor diversion was a game called Mean Aunt Rosie, in which I pretended to be a witchy caregiver and my cousins tried to escape me."
- "Why Gillian Flynn Buys Her Purses from the Liquor Store". Elle. Personal Style. Oct 24, 2013. "Let me give you an idea of my personal aesthetic: Until last year, I had no purse. I carried a wine bag."
- Gillian Flynn's Entertainment Weekly articles

== Filmography ==
=== Film ===
Year	Title	Credited as	
Year	Title	Writer	Notes
2014	Gone Girl	Yes	Directed by David Fincher
2018	Widows	Yes	Co-writer with director Steve McQueen

=== TV ===
Year	Title	Credited as				
Year	Title	Writer	Executive producer	Creator	Showrunner	Notes
2018	Sharp Objects	Yes	Yes	No	No	Network: HBO
2020	Utopia	Yes	Yes	Yes	Yes	Network: Amazon Prime Video
