= 71st Writers Guild of America Awards =

71st WGA Awards
- Date: February 17, 2019
- Organized by: Writers Guild of America, East and the Writers Guild of America West

The 71st Writers Guild of America Awards honored the best in film, television, radio and video-game writing of 2018. Winners were announced on February 17, 2019, at the Beverly Hilton Hotel, Beverly Hills, California and the Edison Ballroom, New York City, New York. The nominations for Television, New Media, Radio, News and Promotional Writing were announced on December 6, 2018. The Theatrical, Documentary Screenplay and Videogame Writing nominees were announced on January 7, 2019.

== Winners and nominees ==
=== Film ===
Best Original Screenplay

Eighth Grade (A24) – Bo Burnham

- Green Book (Universal Pictures) – Nick Vallelonga, Brian Currie & Peter Farrelly†
- A Quiet Place (Paramount Pictures) – Bryan Woods & Scott Beck and John Krasinski; story by Bryan Woods & Scott Beck
- Roma (Netflix) – Alfonso Cuarón
- Vice (Annapurna Pictures) – Adam McKay
Best Adapted Screenplay

Can You Ever Forgive Me? (Fox Searchlight) – Nicole Holofcener and Jeff Whitty; based on the book by Lee Israel

- Black Panther (Walt Disney Studios Motion Pictures) – Ryan Coogler and Joe Robert Cole; based on the Marvel Comics by Stan Lee and Jack Kirby
- BlacKkKlansman (Focus Features) – Charlie Wachtel & David Rabinowitz and Kevin Willmott & Spike Lee; based on the book by Ron Stallworth †
- If Beale Street Could Talk (Annapurna Pictures) – Barry Jenkins; based on the novel by James Baldwin
- A Star Is Born (Warner Bros.) – Eric Roth and Bradley Cooper & Will Fetters; based on the 1954 screenplay by Moss Hart and the 1976 screenplay by John Gregory Dunne & Joan Didion and Frank Pierson, based on a story by William A. Wellman and Robert Carson
Best Documentary Screenplay

Bathtubs Over Broadway (Focus Features) – Ozzy Inguanzo & Dava Whisenant

- Fahrenheit 11/9 (Briarcliff Entertainment) – Michael Moore
- Generation Wealth (Amazon Studios) – Lauren Greenfield
- In Search of Greatness (Art of Sport) – Gabe Polsky

=== Television ===
Drama Series

The Americans (FX) – Peter Ackerman, Hilary Bettis, Joshua Brand, Joel Fields, Sarah Nolen, Stephen Schiff, Justin Weinberger, Joe Weisberg, Tracey Scott Wilson

- Better Call Saul (AMC) – Ann Cherkis, Vince Gilligan, Peter Gould, Gennifer Hutchison, Heather Marion, Bob Odenkirk, Thomas Schnauz, Gordon Smith, Alison Tatlock
- The Crown (Netflix) – Tom Edge, Amy Jenkins, Peter Morgan
- The Handmaid's Tale (Hulu) – Yahlin Chang, Nina Fiore, Dorothy Fortenberry, John Herrera, Lynn Renee Maxcy, Bruce Miller, Kira Snyder, Eric Tuchman
- Succession (HBO) – Jesse Armstrong, Simon Blackwell, Jon Brown, Jonathan Glatzer, Anna Jordan, Lucy Prebble, Georgia Pritchett, Tony Roche, Susan Soon He Stanton, Daniel Zelman
Comedy Series

The Marvelous Mrs. Maisel (Prime Video) – Kate Fodor, Noah Gardenswartz, Jen Kirkman, Sheila Lawrence, Daniel Palladino, Amy Sherman-Palladino

- Atlanta (FX) – Ibra Ake, Donald Glover, Stephen Glover, Taofik Kolade, Jamal Olori, Stefani Robinson, Paul Simms
- Barry (HBO) – Alec Berg, Duffy Boudreau, Bill Hader, Emily Heller, Liz Sarnoff, Ben Smith, Sarah Solemani
- GLOW (Netflix) – Liz Flahive, Tara Herrmann, Nick Jones, Jenji Kohan, Carly Mensch, Marquita Robinson, Kim Rosenstock, Sascha Rothchild, Rachel Shukert
- The Good Place (NBC) – Megan Amram, Christopher Encell, Kate Gersten, Cord Jefferson, Andrew Law, Joe Mande, Kassia Miller, Dylan Morgan, Matt Murray, Rae Sanni, Daniel Schofield, Michael Schur, Josh Siegal, Jen Statsky, Tyler Straessle
New Series

Barry (HBO) – Alec Berg, Duffy Boudreau, Bill Hader, Emily Heller, Liz Sarnoff, Ben Smith, Sarah Solemani

- The Haunting of Hill House (Netflix) – Meredith Averill, Charise Castro Smith, Mike Flanagan, Jeff Howard, Rebecca Leigh Klingel, Scott Kosar, Liz Phang
- Homecoming (Prime Video) – Micah Bloomberg, Cami Delavigne, Eli Horowitz, Shannon Houston, Eric Simonson, David Wiener
- Pose (FX) – Steven Canals, Brad Falchuk, Todd Kubrak, Janet Mock, Ryan Murphy, Our Lady J
- Succession (HBO) – Jesse Armstrong, Simon Blackwell, Jon Brown, Jonathan Glatzer, Anna Jordan, Lucy Prebble, Georgia Pritchett, Tony Roche, Susan Soon He Stanton, Daniel Zelman
Long Form – Original

Castle Rock (Hulu) – Marc Bernardin, Scott Brown, Lila Byock, Mark Lafferty, Sam Shaw, Dustin Thomason, Gina Welch, Vinnie Wilhelm

- My Dinner with Hervé (HBO) – Teleplay by Sacha Gervasi; Story by Sacha Gervasi and Sean Macaulay
- Paterno (HBO) – Debora Cahn and John C. Richards
Long Form – Adapted

The Assassination of Gianni Versace: American Crime Story (FX) – Maggie Cohn and Tom Rob Smith; Based on the book Vulgar Favors by Maureen Orth

- The Looming Tower (Hulu) – Bash Doran, Dan Futterman, Alex Gibney, Shannon Houston, Adam Rapp, Ali Selim, Lawrence Wright; Based on the book by Lawrence Wright
- Maniac (Netflix) – Nick Cuse, Cary Joji Fukunaga, Amelia Gray, Danielle Henderson, Mauricio Katz, Patrick Somerville, Caroline Williams; Based on the Norwegian television series by Espen PA Lervaag, Håakon Bast Mossige, Kjetil Indregard and Ole Marius Araldsen
- Sharp Objects (HBO) – Ariella Blejer, Scott Brown, Vince Calandra, Gillian Flynn, Dawn Kamoche, Alex Metcalf, Marti Noxon; Based on the novel by Gillian Flynn
Short Form New Media – Original

Class of Lies (Snapchat) – Tessa Leigh Williams

- After Forever (Vimeo) – Michael Slade and Kevin Spirtas
- Love Daily (go90) – Lauren Ciaravalli, Andrew Eisen, Aaron Eisenberg, Will Eisenberg, Alexis Jacknow, Nathaniel Katzman, Yulin Kuang, Nathan Larkin-Connolly, Alexis Roblan, Bennet D. Silverman, Ryan Wood
- West 40s (West40s.com) – Mark Sam Rosenthal and Brian Sloan
Short Form New Media – Adapted

The Walking Dead: Red Machete (AMC.com) – Nick Bernardone

Animation

"Bart's Not Dead" – The Simpsons (Fox) – Stephanie Gillis

- "Boywatch" – Bob's Burgers (Fox) – Rich Rinaldi
- "Just One of the Boyz 4 Now for Now" – Bob's Burgers (Fox) – Lizzie Molyneux and Wendy Molyneux
- "Krusty the Clown" – The Simpsons (Fox) – Ryan Koh
- "Mo Mommy, Mo Problems" – Bob's Burgers (Fox) – Steven Davis
- "Send in Stewie, Please" – Family Guy (Fox) – Gary Janetti
Episodic Drama

"Paean to the People" – Homeland (Showtime) – Alex Gansa

- "Camelot" – Narcos: Mexico (Netflix) – Eric Newman and Clayton Trussell
- "The Car" – This Is Us (NBC) – Isaac Aptaker, Elizabeth Berger
- "Episode 407" – The Affair (Showtime) – Teleplay by Lydia Diamond and Sarah Sutherland, Story by Jaquen Tee Castellanos and Sarah Sutherland
- "First Blood" – The Handmaid's Tale (Hulu) – Eric Tuchman
- "The Precious Blood of Jesus" – Ozark (Netflix) – David Manson
Episodic Comedy

"Chapter One: Make Your Mark" – Barry (HBO) – Alec Berg and Bill Hader

- "Another Place" – Forever (Prime Video) – Teleplay by Alan Yang and Matt Hubbard, Story by Aniz Adam Ansari
- "Halibut!" – Santa Clarita Diet (Netflix) – Victor Fresco
- "Kimmy and the Beest!" – Unbreakable Kimmy Schmidt (Netflix) – Robert Carlock
- "Pilot" – The Kids Are Alright (ABC) – Tim Doyle
- "Who Knows Better Than I" – Orange Is the New Black (Netflix) – Jenji Kohan
Comedy/Variety – Talk Series

Last Week Tonight with John Oliver (HBO) – Tim Carvell, Raquel D'Apice, Josh Gondelman, Dan Gurewitch, Jeff Maurer, Daniel O'Brien, John Oliver, Brian Parise, Ben Silva, Will Tracy, Jill Twiss, Seena Vali, Juli Weiner

- Full Frontal with Samantha Bee (TBS) – Kristen Bartlett, Samantha Bee, Ashley Nicole Black, Pat Cassels, Mike Drucker, Eric Drysdale, Mathan Erhardt, Joe Grossman, Miles Kahn, Nicole Silverberg, Melinda Taub
- Late Night with Seth Meyers (NBC) – Supervising Writers: Sal Gentile, Seth Reiss; Writers: Jermaine Affonso, Alex Baze, Bryan Donaldson, Matt Goldich, Dina Gusovsky, Jenny Hagel, Allison Hord, Mike Karnell, John Lutz, Seth Meyers, Ian Morgan, Amber Ruffin, Mike Scollins, Mike Shoemaker
- The Late Show with Stephen Colbert (CBS) – Jay Katsir, Opus Moreschi, Emmy Blotnick, Mike Brumm, Aaron Cohen, Stephen Colbert, Cullen Crawford, Paul Dinello, Ariel Dumas, Glenn Eichler, Django Gold, Gabe Gronli, Greg Iwinski, Barry Julien, Daniel Kibblesmith, Matt Lappin, Michael Pielocik, Jen Spyra, Brian Stack, John Thibodeaux
Comedy/Variety – Sketch Series

Nathan For You (Comedy Central) – Leo Allen, Nathan Fielder, Carrie Kemper, Adam Locke-Norton, Eric Notarnicola

- At Home with Amy Sedaris (truTV) – Cindy Caponera, Paul Dinello, Jodi Lennon, Meredith Scardino, Amy Sedaris
- I Love You, America (Hulu) – Head Writer: Dave Ferguson; Writers: Glenn Boozan, Leann Bowen, Raj Desai, Kyle Dunnigan, John Haskell, Tim Kalpakis, Opeyemi Olagbaju, Gavin Purcell, Diona Reasonover, Jocelyn Richard, Christopher J. Romano, Sarah Silverman, Beth Stelling, Dan Sterling, Nick Wiger
- Portlandia (IFC) – Fred Armisen, Carrie Brownstein, Karen Kilgariff, Jonathan Krisel, Karey Dorentto, Megan Neuringer, Phoebe Robinson, Graham Wagner
- Saturday Night Live (NBC) – Head Writers: Michael Che, Colin Jost, Kent Sublette, Bryan Tucker; Supervising Writers: Fran Gillespie, Sudi Green, Streeter Seidell; Writers: James Anderson, Kristen Bartlett, Megan Callahan, Steve Castillo, Andrew Dismukes, Anna Drezen, Claire Friedman, Alison Gates, Steve Higgins, Sam Jay, Erik Kenward, Rob Klein, Nick Kocher, Michael Koman, Alan Linic, Eli Coyote Mandal, Erik Marino, Dave McCary, Brian McElhaney, Dennis McNicholas, Lorne Michaels, Nimesh Patel, Josh Patten, Katie Rich, Simon Rich, Gary Richardson, Marika Sawyer, Pete Schultz, Mitch Silpa, Will Stephen, Julio Torres, Bowen Yang
Comedy/Variety (Music, Awards, Tributes) – Specials

The Fake News with Ted Nelms (Comedy Central) – John Aboud, Andrew Blitz, Michael Colton, Ed Helms, Elliott Kalan, Joseph Randazzo, Sara Schaefer

- 2018 Rose Parade Hosted by Cord & Tish (Prime Video) – Will Ferrell, Jake Fogelnest, Andrew Steele
- Drew Michael Stand-Up Special (HBO) – Drew Michael
- The Oscars 2018 (ABC) – Dave Boone, Carol Leifer, Jon Macks; Special Material Written by Megan Amram, Tony Barbieri, Jonathan Bines, Joelle Boucai, Gonzalo Cordova, Adam Carolla, Devin Field, Gary Greenberg, Josh Halloway, Sal Iacono, Eric Immerman, Jesse Joyce, Bess Kalb, Jimmy Kimmel, Molly McNearney, Danny Ricker, Joe Strazzullo
Quiz and Audience Participation

Who Wants to Be a Millionaire (Disney/ABC Syndication) – Head Writer: Stephen A. Melcher Jr.; Writers: Kyle Beakley, Tom Cohen, Patricia A. Cotter, Ryan Hopak, Gary Lucy, James Rowley, Ann Slichter, Dylan Snowden

- Hollywood Game Night (NBC) – Head Writers: Ann Slichter, Grant Taylor; Writers: Michael Agbabian, Alexandra Kokesh, Dwight D. Smith
- Jeopardy! (ABC) – Matthew Caruso, John Duarte, Harry Friedman, Mark Gaberman, Deborah Griffin, Michele Loud, Robert McClenaghan, Jim Rhine, Steve D. Tamerius, Billy Wisse
- Paid Off with Michael Torpey (truTV) – Head Writer: Ethan Berlin; Writers: John Chaneski, Rosemarie DiSalvo, Leigh Hampton, Katie Hartman, Amanda Melson, Larry Owens, Jennie Sutton, Michael Torpey, Jeremy Weiner; truTV
Daytime Drama

General Hospital (ABC) – Head Writers: Shelly Altman, Christopher Van Etten; Writers: Barbara Bloom, Anna Theresa Cascio, Suzanne Flynn, Charlotte Gibson, Lucky Gold, Kate Hall, Elizabeth Korte, Daniel James O'Connor, Donny Sheldon, Scott Sickles

- Days of Our Lives (NBC) – Head Writer: Ron Carlivati; Writers: Sheri Anderson, Lorraine Broderick, David Cherrill, Joanna Cohen, Lisa Connor, Carolyn Culliton, Richard Culliton, Rick Draughon, Cydney Kelley, David Kreizman, David A. Levinson, Rebecca McCarty, Ryan Quan, Dave Ryan, Katherine Schock, Elizabeth Snyder, Tyler Topits
Children's Script – Episodic and Specials

"The Ersatz Elevator: Part One" – A Series of Unfortunate Events (Netflix) – Daniel Handler

- "Carnivorous Carnival: Part One" – A Series of Unfortunate Events (Netflix) – Joe Tracz
- "For the Last Time" – Andi Mack (Disney Channel) – Jonathan S. Hurwitz
- "Picture Day" – Alexa & Katie (Netflix) – Ray Lancon
- "Warehouse Towel Fight" (Netflix) – Marty Donovan

==== Documentary ====
Documentary Script – Current Events

"Trump's Takeover" – Frontline (PBS) – Michael Kirk and Mike Wiser

- "Black Hole Apocalypse" – Nova (PBS) – Rushmore DeNooyer
- "Blackout in Puerto Rico" – Frontline (PBS) – Rick Young
- "The Gang Crackdown" – Frontline (PBS) – Marcela Gaviria
Documentary Script – Other than Current Events

"The Eugenics Crusade" – American Experience (PBS) – Michelle Ferrari

- "Bitter Rivals: Iran and Saudi Arabia – Part 1" – Frontline (PBS) – David Fanning, Linda Hirsch and Martin Smith
- "The Circus, Part One" – American Experience (PBS) – Sharon Grimberg
- "Into the Amazon" – American Experience (PBS) – John Maggio

==== News ====
TV News Script – Regularly Scheduled, Bulletin, or Breaking Report

"Catastrophe" – 60 Minutes (CBS) – Scott Pelley, Katie Kerbstat, Nicole Young

- "Las Vegas Massacre" – CBS Evening News with Anthony Mason (CBS News) – Jerry Cipriano and Joe Clines
- "The Spotted Pig" – 60 Minutes (CBS) – Anderson Cooper and Oriana Zill de Granados
TV News Script – Analysis, Feature, or Commentary

"Wounds of War" – 60 Minutes (CBS) – Scott Pelley, Katie Kerbstat, and Nicole Young

- "100,000 Women" – 60 Minutes (CBS) – Scott Pelley and Oriana Zill de Granados
- "On Broadway: Rodgers and Hammerstein" – CBS Sunday Morning (CBS News) – Mo Rocca and Kay M. Lim
- "War Crime" – 60 Minutes (CBS) – Scott Pelley, Katie Kerbstat, and Nicole Young
Digital News

"Inside the Culture of Sexism at Riot Games" (Kotaku.com) – Cecilia D'Anastasio

- "D.C.'s Biggest Homeless Shelter is About to Close. Will Amazon Take Its Place?" (Splinter) – Emma Roller
- "How to Not Die in America" (Splinter) – Molly Osberg

=== Radio ===
Radio Documentary

"RFK: 50 Years After Shots Rang Out at the Ambassador Hotel" (ABC News Radio) – Andrew Evans

- "2017 Year in Review" (CBS Radio News) – Gail Lee
Radio News Script – Regularly Scheduled, Bulletin, or Breaking Report

"Remembering The Good, The Bad and the Brilliant" (CBS Radio News) – Gail Lee

- "5pm CBS News Radio Glor Newscast" (CBS Radio News) – James Hutton
- "ABC News 6p Hourly 9-27-2018" (ABC News Radio) – Stephanie Pawlowski
- "World News This Week: 9-21-2018" (ABC News Radio) – Joan B. Harris
Radio News Script – Analysis, Feature or Commentary

"John McCain: A Life of Service" (CBS Radio News) – Gail Lee

- "A Tribute to Le Grand Orange" (CBS Radio News) – Thomas A. Sabella

=== Promotional Writing ===
On-Air Promotion – Television or Radio

"Tribute to Star Trek for the 2018 Creative Arts Emmys" (CBS) – Sean Brogan

- "FBI 2018 Promo Reel" (CBS) – Ralph Buado
- "Westworld: Season 2 Promo (Super Bowl spot)" (HBO) – Jonathan Nolan

=== Videogame Writing ===
Outstanding Achievement in Videogame Writing

God of War (Sony Interactive Entertainment) – Matt Sophos, Richard Zangrande Gaubert, Cory Barlog; Story and Narrative Design Lead: Matt Sophos; Story and Narrative Design: Richard Zangrande Gaubert; Narrative Design: Orion Walker, Adam Dolin

- Assassin's Creed Odyssey (Ubisoft Quebec) – Associate Narrative Directors: Matthew Zagurak, Joel Janisse, James Richard Mittag; Narrative Director: Melissa MacCoubrey; Story by Jonathan Dumont, Melissa MacCoubrey, Hugo Giard; Scriptwriters: Madeleine Hart, Betty Robertson, Jesse Scoble, Diana Sherman, Kelly Bender, Jojo Chia, Ian Fun, Zachary M. Parris, Ken Williamson, Daniel Bingham, Jordan Lemos, Simon Mackenzie, Katelyn MacMullin, Susan Patrick, Alissa Ralph, Stephen Rhodes; Team Lead Writer: Sam Gill; AI Writers: Jonathan Flieger, Kimberly Ann Sparks
- Batman: The Enemy Within, Episode 5 – Same Stitch (Telltale Games) – Lead Writer: James Windeler; Written by Meghan Thornton, Ross Beeley, Lauren Mee; Story by: Meghan Thornton, Michael Kirkbride
- Marvel's Spider-Man (Insomniac Games and Sony Interactive Entertainment) – Story Lead: Jon Paquette; Writers: Benjamin Arfmann, Kelsey Beachum; Co-Written by Christos Gage; Additional Story Contributions by Dan Slott
- Pillars of Eternity II: Deadfire (Obsidian Entertainment) – Narrative Designers: Alex Scokel, Eric Fenstermaker, Kate Dollarhyde, Megan Starks, Olivia Veras, Paul Kirsch; Additional Writing: Tony Evans, John Schmautz, Casey Hollingshead, Nitai Poddar; Narrative Design Leads: Carrie Patel, Josh Sawyer

=== Special awards ===
Paul Selvin Award

Vice – Adam McKay

Laurel Award for Screenwriting Achievement

Lowell Ganz and Babaloo Mandel

Laurel Award for TV Writing Achievement

Jenji Kohan
