= Writers Guild of America Award for Best Documentary Screenplay =

Annual screenwriting award

Writers Guild of America Award for Documentary Screenplay
- Awarded for: Outstanding Writing for a Documentary Film
- Country: United States
- Presented by: Writers Guild of America
- First award: 2005
- Currently held by: Mstyslav Chernov for 2000 Meters to Andriivka (2026)
- Website: https://www.wga.org/

The Writers Guild of America Award for Best Documentary Screenplay is one of three screenwriting Writers Guild of America Awards focused specifically for film. The award is presented to the best screenplay of the year for a documentary feature. It has been presented annually since the 57th Writers Guild of America Awards in 2005. Alex Gibney is the only person to win multiple awards, winning four. Gibney also holds the record for nominations with eleven. Ari Folman's Waltz with Bashir remains the only animated film to ever won a WGA award.

== Winners and nominees ==
=== Notes ===
- The year indicates when the film was released. The awards are presented the following year.

=== 2000s ===
| Year | Film | Writer(s) |
|---|---|---|
| 2004 (57th) | Super Size Me | Morgan Spurlock |
| 2004 (57th) | Bright Leaves | Ross McElwee |
| 2004 (57th) | Control Room | Julia Bacha and Jehane Noujaim |
| 2004 (57th) | Home of the Brave | Paola di Florio |
| 2004 (57th) | The Hunting of the President | Harry Thomason and Nickolas Perry |
| 2004 (57th) | In the Realms of the Unreal | Jessica Yu |
| 2005 (58th) | Enron: The Smartest Guys in the Room | Alex Gibney; based on the book The Smartest Guys in the Room: The Amazing Rise and Scandalous Fall of Enron by Bethany McLean and Peter Elkind |
| 2005 (58th) | Cowboy del Amor | Michèle Ohayon |
| 2005 (58th) | March of the Penguins | Luc Jacquet and Michel Fessler (narration written by Jordan Roberts); based on the story by Luc Jacquet |
| 2005 (58th) | Street Fight | Marshall Curry |
| 2005 (58th) | The Fall of Fujimori | Ellen Perry, Zack Anderson, and Kim Roberts |
| 2006 (59th) | Deliver Us from Evil | Amy J. Berg |
| 2006 (59th) | Once in a Lifetime: The Extraordinary Story of the New York Cosmos | Mark Monroe; story by Mark Monroe and John Dower |
| 2006 (59th) | The Heart of the Game | Ward Serrill |
| 2006 (59th) | Who Killed the Electric Car? | Chris Paine |
| 2006 (59th) | Why We Fight | Eugene Jarecki |
| 2007 (60th) | Taxi to the Dark Side | Alex Gibney |
| 2007 (60th) | Nanking | Bill Guttentag, Dan Sturman, and Elisabeth Bentley; story by Bill Guttentag and Dan Sturman |
| 2007 (60th) | No End in Sight | Charles Ferguson |
| 2007 (60th) | The Camden 28 | Anthony Giacchino |
| 2007 (60th) | The Rape of Europa | Richard Berge, Nicole Newnham, and Bonni Cohen |
| 2007 (60th) | Sicko | Michael Moore |
| 2008 (61st) | Waltz with Bashir | Ari Folman |
| 2008 (61st) | Boogie Man: The Lee Atwater Story | Stefan Forbes and Noland Walker |
| 2008 (61st) | Chicago 10 | Brett Morgen |
| 2008 (61st) | Fuel | Johnny O'Hara |
| 2008 (61st) | Gonzo: The Life and Work of Dr. Hunter S. Thompson | Alex Gibney; from the words of Hunter S. Thompson |
| 2009 (62nd) | The Cove | Mark Monroe |
| 2009 (62nd) | Against the Tide | Richard Trank; based on original material written by Richard Trank and Rabbi Marvin Hier |
| 2009 (62nd) | Capitalism: A Love Story | Michael Moore |
| 2009 (62nd) | Earth Days | Robert Stone |
| 2009 (62nd) | Good Hair | Chris Rock, Jeff Stilson, Lance Crouther, and Chuck Sklar |
| 2009 (62nd) | Soundtrack for a Revolution | Bill Guttentag and Dan Sturman |

=== 2010s ===
| Year | Film | Writer(s) |
|---|---|---|
| 2010 (63rd) | Inside Job | Charles Ferguson; co-written by Chad Beck and Adam Bolt |
| 2010 (63rd) | Enemies of the People | Rob Lemkin and Thet Sambath |
| 2010 (63rd) | Freedom Riders | Stanley Nelson Jr.; based in part on the book Freedom Riders: 1961 and the Struggle for Racial Justice by Raymond Arsenault |
| 2010 (63rd) | Gasland | Josh Fox |
| 2010 (63rd) | The Two Escobars | Michael Zimbalist and Jeff Zimbalist |
| 2010 (63rd) | Who Is Harry Nilsson (And Why Is Everybody Talkin' About Him)? | John Scheinfeld |
| 2011 (64th) | Better This World | Katie Galloway and Kelly Duane de la Vega |
| 2011 (64th) | If a Tree Falls: A Story of the Earth Liberation Front | Marshall Curry and Matthew Hamachek |
| 2011 (64th) | Nostalgia for the Light | Patricio Guzmán |
| 2011 (64th) | Pina | Wim Wenders |
| 2011 (64th) | Position Among the Stars | Hetty Naaijkens-Retel Helmrich and Leonard Retel Helmrich |
| 2011 (64th) | Senna | Manish Pandey |
| 2012 (65th) | Searching for Sugar Man | Malik Bendjelloul |
| 2012 (65th) | Mea Maxima Culpa: Silence in the House of God | Alex Gibney |
| 2012 (65th) | The Central Park Five | Sarah Burns, David McMahon, and Ken Burns |
| 2012 (65th) | The Invisible War | Kirby Dick |
| 2012 (65th) | We Are Legion: The Story of the Hacktivists | Brian Knappenberger |
| 2012 (65th) | West of Memphis | Amy J. Berg and Billy McMillin |
| 2013 (66th) | Stories We Tell | Sarah Polley |
| 2013 (66th) | Dirty Wars | Jeremy Scahill and David Riker |
| 2013 (66th) | Herblock: The Black & The White | Sara Lukinson and Michael Stevens |
| 2013 (66th) | No Place on Earth | Janet Tobias and Paul Laikin |
| 2013 (66th) | We Steal Secrets: The Story of WikiLeaks | Alex Gibney |
| 2014 (67th) | The Internet's Own Boy: The Story of Aaron Swartz | Brian Knappenberger |
| 2014 (67th) | Finding Vivian Maier | John Maloof and Charlie Siskel |
| 2014 (67th) | Last Days in Vietnam | Mark Bailey and Kevin McAlester |
| 2014 (67th) | Red Army | Gabe Polsky |
| 2015 (68th) | Going Clear: Scientology and the Prison of Belief | Alex Gibney |
| 2015 (68th) | Being Canadian | Robert Cohen |
| 2015 (68th) | Kurt Cobain: Montage of Heck | Brett Morgen |
| 2015 (68th) | Prophet's Prey | Amy J. Berg |
| 2016 (69th) | Command and Control | Robert Kenner, Brian Pearle, Kim Roberts, and Eric Schlosser; based on the book Command and Control: Nuclear Weapons, the Damascus Accident, and the Illusion of Safety by Eric Schlosser |
| 2016 (69th) | Author: The JT LeRoy Story | Jeff Feuerzeig |
| 2016 (69th) | Zero Days | Alex Gibney |
| 2017 (70th) | Jane | Brett Morgen |
| 2017 (70th) | Betting on Zero | Ted Braun |
| 2017 (70th) | No Stone Unturned | Alex Gibney |
| 2017 (70th) | Oklahoma City | Barak Goodman |
| 2018 (71st) | Bathtubs Over Broadway | Ozzy Inguanzo & Dava Whisenant |
| 2018 (71st) | Fahrenheit 11/9 | Michael Moore |
| 2018 (71st) | Generation Wealth | Lauren Greenfield |
| 2018 (71st) | In Search of Greatness | Gabe Polsky |
| 2019 (72nd) | The Inventor: Out for Blood in Silicon Valley | Alex Gibney |
| 2019 (72nd) | Citizen K | Alex Gibney |
| 2019 (72nd) | Foster | Mark Jonathan Harris |
| 2019 (72nd) | Joseph Pulitzer: Voice of the People | Robert Seidman and Oren Rudavsky |
| 2019 (72nd) | The Kingmaker | Lauren Greenfield |

=== 2020s ===
| Year | Film | Writer(s) |
|---|---|---|
| 2020 (73rd) | The Dissident | Mark Monroe & Bryan Fogel |
| 2020 (73rd) | All In: The Fight for Democracy | Jack Youngelson |
| 2020 (73rd) | Herb Albert Is... | John Scheinfeld |
| 2020 (73rd) | Red Penguins | Gabe Polsky |
| 2020 (73rd) | Totally Under Control | Alex Gibney |
| 2021 (74th) | Exposing Muybridge | Marc Shaffer |
| 2021 (74th) | Becoming Cousteau | Mark Monroe & Pax Wasserman |
| 2021 (74th) | Like a Rolling Stone: The Life & Times of Ben Fong-Torres | Suzanne Joe Kai |
| 2022 (75th) | Moonage Daydream | Brett Morgen |
| 2022 (75th) | 2nd Chance | Ramin Bahrani |
| 2022 (75th) | Downfall: The Case Against Boeing | Mark Bailey and Keven McAlester |
| 2022 (75th) | Last Flight Home | Ondi Timoner |
| 2022 (75th) | ¡Viva Maestro! | Theodore Braun |
| 2023 (76th) | The Pigeon Tunnel | Errol Morris |
| 2023 (76th) | Bella! | Jeff L. Lieberman |
| 2023 (76th) | It Ain't Over | Sean Mullin |
| 2023 (76th) | Stamped from the Beginning | David Teague; based on the book Stamped from the Beginning by Ibram X. Kendi |
| 2023 (76th) | What the Hell Happened to Blood, Sweat & Tears? | John Scheinfeld |
| 2024 (77th) | Jim Henson: Idea Man | Mark Monroe |
| 2024 (77th) | Kiss the Future | Bill S. Carter and Nenad Cicin-Sain |
| 2024 (77th) | Martha | R.J. Cutler |
| 2024 (77th) | War Game | Tony Gerber and Jesse Moss |
| 2025 (78th) | 2000 Meters to Andriivka | Mstyslav Chernov |
| 2025 (78th) | Becoming Led Zeppelin | Bernard MacMahon and Allison McGourty |
| 2025 (78th) | White with Fear | Andrew Goldberg |

== Writers with multiple awards ==
4 awards

- Alex Gibney

3 awards

- Mark Monroe

2 awards

- Brett Morgen

== Writers with multiple nominations ==
11 nominations

- Alex Gibney

5 Nominations

- Mark Monroe

3 nominations

- Amy J. Berg
- Michael Moore
- Brett Morgen

2 nominations

- Marshall Curry
- Charles Ferguson
- Lauren Greenfield
- Bill Guttentag
- Brian Knappenberger
- Gabe Polsky
- Kim Roberts
- Dan Sturman
