= Richmond Fontaine =

American four-piece rock and alternative country band, based in Portland, Oregon, U.S.

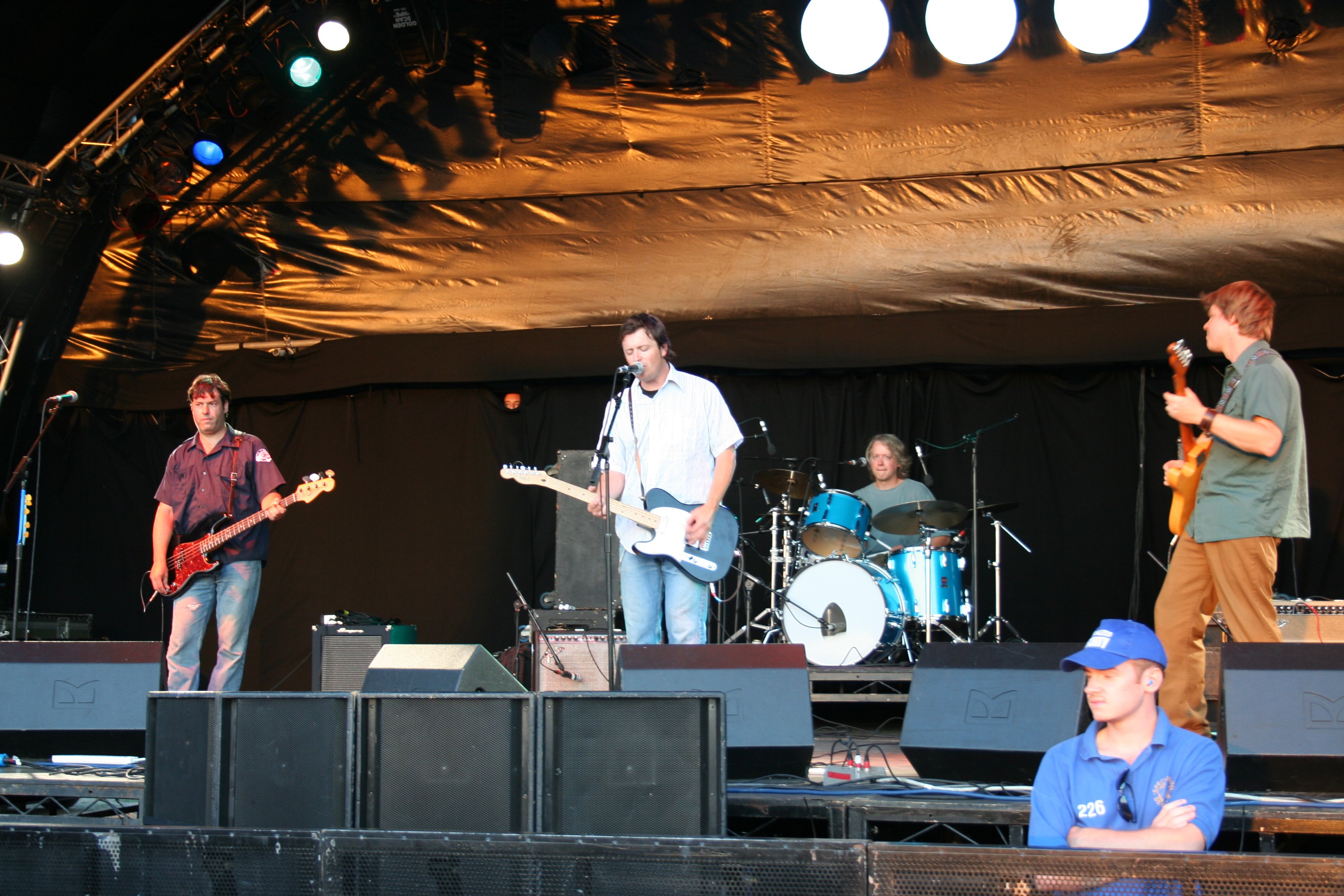

Background information
- Origin: Portland, Oregon, U.S.
- Genres: Rock, Alternative country, punk rock (first three albums)
- Years active: 1994–2016
- Labels: Cavity Search, Decor Records, Fluff And Gravy Records
- Past members: Willy Vlautin; Freddy Trujillo; Sean Oldham; Dan Eccles; Dave Harding; Paul Brainard; Joe Davis; Stuart Gaston; Matt Gilley

Richmond Fontaine was an American four-piece rock and alternative country band, based in Portland, Oregon. They were active between 1994 and 2016 and recorded eleven studio albums, four live albums and two EPs.

Underpinned by lead singer and songwriter Willy Vlautin's lyrics, Richmond Fontaine songs often evoke imagery of Reno, Nevada, Portland, the Western United States, and Mexico, while telling stories in a style that critics have compared to Raymond Carver. The group has cited influences such as Gram Parsons, X, Green on Red and Dave Alvin.

== History ==
Formed in 1994, Richmond Fontaine started touring the Pacific Northwest live circuit to support their first three albums released on Cavity Search Records. Gradually gaining attention in the UK and Europe the band began regularly touring there. Most of the core musicians and producer J. D. Foster have worked together for a decade, and produced several albums. The band is named after an American expat, "a burned out hippy", who helped bassist Dave Harding when his car was stuck in the desert in the Baja California Peninsula.

Richmond Fontaine first gained exposure outside the United States through a song that was included on a Vinyl Junkie Records 'Loose' compilation released in the UK. This was followed by the band's self-released fourth album, Winnemucca. The band signed with Decor Records in Europe during 2003 with their next two releases proving pivotal to the band's success. Both were made "Albums of the Month" in influential magazine, Uncut, which named both their fifth album Post to Wire (2004) and sixth The Fitzgerald (2005) "masterpieces". U.S. critics have been generally complimentary but have also cited the band's musical similarity to Uncle Tupelo.

The band's 2007 album, Thirteen Cities, received positive reviews across Europe. This was followed by We Used to Think the Freeway Sounded Like a River in August 2009, The High Country in September 2011, and You Can't Go Back If There's Nothing To Go Back To in March 2016.

== Other projects ==
Lead singer and songwriter Vlautin is also a novelist, with five books published since his debut, The Motel Life, in 2006. He formed new group The Delines, along with fellow Richmond Fontaine members Freddy Trujillo and Sean Oldham, in 2014.

== Members ==
- Willy Vlautin: vocals, acoustic and electric guitars
- Freddy Trujillo: bass, vocals
- Sean Oldham: drums, percussion, vibes, vocals
- Dan Eccles: lead guitar
- Dave Harding: bass, guitars, vocals
- Paul Brainard: pedal steel guitar, piano, electric guitar, vibes, acoustic guitar, Trumpet, vocals
- Joe Davis: drums
- Stuart Gaston: drums
- Matt Gilley: drums (one live performance in 1997)

== Selected discography ==
Studio albums

- Safety (1996)
- Miles From (1997)
- Lost Son (1999)
- Winnemucca (2002)
- Post to Wire (2003)
- The Fitzgerald (2005)
- Obliteration by Time (2006)
- Thirteen Cities (2007)
- We Used to Think the Freeway Sounded Like a River (2009)
- The High Country (2011) (UK Albums Chart peak: No. 115)
- You Can't Go Back If There's Nothing To Go Back To (2016) (UK Albums Chart peak: No. 65) (UK Country Chart peak: No.1)
- Don't Skip Out On Me (2018) - Instrumental soundtrack to the Willy Vlautin book of the same name. (2018)
