= Su nombre es Fujimori =

Documentary film directed by Fernando Vílchez

- Directed by: Fernando Vílchez
- Release date: May 30, 2016
- Running time: 105 minutes
- Country: Peru
- Language: Spanish

Su nombre es Fujimori (Spanish: His name is Fujimori) is a documentary film directed by Peruvian Fernando Vílchez that shows a retrospective criticism of Fujimorato. It was part of the campaign for Anti-Fujimorism during the 2016 Peruvian general election.

== Synopsis ==
The documentary tours the history of the government of Alberto Fujimori (1990-2001), reviewing the most controversial incidents, establishing parallels with the possible return of Fujimorism embodied in Fujimori's daughter, Keiko, who ran in 2016 for the presidency of Peru and who had ties in the father's government. Among other things, the film denounces the forced sterilizations during the Fujimorist regime, and shows the Four Quarters March, a national popular mobilization that took place in 2000.

== Production ==
The documentary started production only twelve days before the premiere, on April 30, 2016, six days before the celebration of the second round of elections between the candidates Keiko Fujimori of Popular Force and Pedro Pablo Kuczynski of Peruvians for Change.

It was produced by Bergman Was Right Films, premiered online and for free, and was viewed by 700 million people.

== See also ==
- The Fall of Fujimori
