= Maniac (miniseries) =

American psychological black comedy-drama television miniseries

- Genre: Black comedy; Psychological drama; Science fiction; Surrealism
- Created by: Patrick Somerville
- Based on: Maniac by: Espen PA Lervaag; Håakon Bast Mossige; Kjetil Indregard; Ole Marius Araldsen
- Developed by: Cary Joji Fukunaga; Patrick Somerville
- Directed by: Cary Joji Fukunaga
- Starring: Emma Stone; Jonah Hill; Justin Theroux; Sonoya Mizuno; Gabriel Byrne; Sally Field
- Composer: Dan Romer
- Country of origin: United States
- Original language: English
- No. of episodes: 10

Production
- Executive producers: Patrick Somerville; Cary Joji Fukunaga; Michael Sugar; Doug Wald; Jonah Hill; Emma Stone; Pal Kristiansen; Anne Kolbjørnsen; Espen Huseby
- Producers: Carol Cuddy; Jessica Levin; Jon Mallard
- Cinematography: Darren Lew
- Editors: Tim Streeto; Pete Beaudreau
- Camera setup: Single-camera
- Running time: 26–47 minutes
- Production companies: Parliament of Owls; Rubicon TV; Anonymous Content; Paramount Television

Original release
- Network: Netflix
- Release: September 21, 2018

Related
- Maniac (Norwegian TV series)

Maniac is an American psychological black comedy drama television miniseries that premiered on Netflix on September 21, 2018, after being announced in 2016. Patrick Somerville created the series and Cary Joji Fukunaga directed, basing it very loosely on the 2015 Norwegian television series of the same name (starring co-creator Espen PA Lervaag) while drawing inspiration from many more famous films. The 10-episode series stars Emma Stone, Jonah Hill, Justin Theroux, Sonoya Mizuno, Gabriel Byrne, and Sally Field. The plot follows two strangers who connect during a mind-bending pharmaceutical trial set in a retro-future New York City.

The series received positive reviews from critics upon release, with many praising its visuals, direction, and acting, particularly the performances of Stone and Hill. The series received multiple accolades, including nominations for Stone's performance—both at the 23rd Satellite Awards and the 25th Screen Actors Guild Awards—and for the series's overall writing—at the 71st Writers Guild of America Awards.

== Premise ==
Maniac follows Annie Landsberg and Owen Milgrim, two strangers who connect during a risky, psychologically intense, twelve-person, mind-bending pharmaceutical trial conducted by Neberdine Pharmaceutical Biotech (NPB). The experiment, originally overseen by Dr. Robert Muramoto and Dr. Azumi Fujita, later falls under the purview of the study's original designer, the eccentric Dr. James K. Mantleray. Together, Annie and Owen go on a mind-bending odyssey through various hallucinatory worlds.

== Languages ==
In addition to English, the original voicework features spoken Japanese and Icelandic, and (to a lesser extent) French. Netflix offers at least five different dubbings and five different subtitle options in different languages.

== Cast and characters ==
=== Main ===
- Emma Stone as Annie Landsberg, a woman with borderline personality disorder who dwells unhealthily on her relationships. Stone also portrays Landsberg's alternate forms: Linda Marino, Arlie Kane, Annia, and Ruth in the B and C pill-induced fantasies.
- Jonah Hill as Owen Milgrim, the son of a wealthy family who potentially has schizophrenia. Having decided to make his way without his family's assistance, Milgrim struggles to hold a job and provide for himself. Hill also portrays Milgrim's alternate representations: Bruce Marino, Oliver "Ollie" Hightower, and Snorri in the B and C pill-induced fantasies.
- Justin Theroux as Dr. James K. Mantleray, a scientist working on the Neberdine Pharmaceutical Biotech (NPB) experiment. Previously removed from the experiment's team, Mantleray is brought back on following the death of Dr. Robert Muramoto.
- Sonoya Mizuno as Dr. Azumi Fujita, a scientist who runs the NPB experiment. She feels immense pressure to provide results from the experiment to her superiors.
- Gabriel Byrne as Porter Milgrim, a wealthy industrialist and father of Owen and his siblings.
- Sally Field as Dr. Greta Mantleray, a famous therapist and the mother of Dr. James K. Mantleray. Field also portrays Lady Neberdine and Queen Gertrude in the B and C pill-induced dreams respectively, and provides the voice and embodiment of GRTA, a smart computer used in the NPB experiment that has a deep emotional relationship with Dr. Muramoto and reacts strongly to his death.

=== Recurring ===
- Kathleen Choe as Soo, test subject #3 in the NPB Phase III experiment
- Danny Hoch as Alexander, test subject #5
- Stephen Hill as D'Nail, test subject #7
- Allyce Beasley as Amelia, test subject #11
- James Monroe Iglehart as Carl, an orderly at NPB
- Dai Ishiguro as Head Control Tech, an NPB employee
- Sejal Shah as First Medical Tech, an NPB employee
- Billy Magnussen as Jed Milgrim, one of Owen's brothers. Magnussen also portrays Grimsson, a man whom Owen hallucinates.
- Julia Garner as Ellie Landsberg, Annie's deceased younger sister
- Nate Craig as Phil
- Jemima Kirke as Adelaide, Jed's fiancée whom Owen has feelings for.
- Jesse Magnussen
- Alexandra Curran as Holly Milgrim
- Rome Kanda as Dr. Robert Muramoto, a colleague of Dr. Fujita.
- Aaralyn Anderson as Belle Milgrim / Danielle Marino / Australia
- Hannah and Cailin Loesch as the Ladies of Arquesta, who first appear as guests at the Full Moon Séance. They also portray two of the McMurphies.
- Trudie Styler as Angelica Milgrim, Owen's mother and Porter's wife.
- Christian DeMarais as Mike Milgrim, one of Owen's brothers.
- Geoffrey Cantor as Frank, the Milgrim family's lawyer that is representing Jed.
- Josh Pais as Andy
- Ariel Kavoussi as Audra, an AdBuddy employee that Annie considers signing up with. Kavoussi also portrays Bianca Forsythe and provides the voice of Dragonfly.
- Grace Van Patten as Olivia Meadows, Owen's former crush whom he yelled at while experiencing his first BLIP (brief and limited psychosis) in college.
- Lev Gorn as Sokolov
- Hank Azaria as Hank Landsberg, Annie's father
- Selenis Leyva as Patricia Lugo, the intake director at Neberdine Pharmaceutical and Biotech whom Annie blackmails into getting into NBD's drug study.
- Leo Fitzpatrick as Lance, a smuggler of exotic wildlife for use in clothing and one of Sebastian's two sons.
- Jojo Gonzalez as Agent Lopez, a New York Fish and Wildlife officer searching for a ring-tailed lemur taken from the nursing home that Linda works at.
- Maxine Prescott as Mrs. Finklestein, an elderly woman that lives in Owen's apartment building. Prescott also portrays Harriet, a resident of the old folks home that Linda works at.
- Joseph Sikora as JC, a smuggler of exotic wildlife for use in clothing and one of Sebastian's two sons.
- David Fierro as Bobby, Olliver Hightower's driver. Fierro also portrays an AdBuddy employee that Owen hires.
- Glenn Wein as Lord Jopling, a guest at the Full Moon Séance. Wein also portrays an AdBuddy employee with halitosis that Owen hires.
- Jonathan Rentler as Greg Nazlund, a truck driver who crashed into Annie's car five years ago, killing her sister Ellie. Rentler also portrays a ranger that Annia encounters.

=== Guest ===
- Marcus Toji as Calvin Muramoto (episode: "Windmills"), Dr. Robert Muramoto's son and also Annie's drug dealer that initially supplies her with NPB's "A" pills, to which she is addicted. She goes to him for more and, after informing her that he is all out, suggests that she sign up for one of NPB's drug studies.
- Glenn Fleshler as Sebastian (episode: "Furs by Sebastian"), the owner of a fur shop, Furs by Sebastian, that is creating clothing out of exotic animals. Linda and Bruce attempt to take back a ring-tailed lemur that he had stolen from them.
- Jennifer Ikeda as Therapist (episode: "Option C"), Owen's therapist at the Horton Psychiatric Facility where he is sent after condemning his brother in court.
- Ben Sinclair as “friend” (episode: “Option C”), Annie's friend proxy for Owen before visiting him in the asylum.

== Episodes ==
Maniac features 10 episodes, each running between 26–47 minutes. All episodes to the miniseries were released simultaneously on September 21, 2018.

No.	Title	Directed by	Written by	Original release date
1	"The Chosen One!"	Cary Joji Fukunaga	Patrick Somerville	September 21, 2018
In an alternate reality New York City, where advertising is omnipresent, Owen Milgrim is a man suffering from schizophrenia, but hiding his symptoms from his family, including seeing an imaginary brother named Grimsson (who resembles his brother Jed with a moustache) who keeps reminding him that he is on a mission of some kind. His family runs a successful industrial business and are protecting Jed from accusations of sexual misconduct, something Owen plans on defending him from by providing a false alibi. Eventually, Owen is laid off from his job and refuses his father's offer of working with his company and accepting his money. He hears about Neberdine, a pharmaceutical company, and signs on to test their new drug which can supposedly cure all disorders. While there, he meets the anti-social Annie Landsberg, who Grimsson explains is the agent he needs to see. When he speaks to her, Annie keeps him from getting them both in trouble by "confirming" her association to him, but tells him not to "blow [their] cover". Owen complies as he prepares for the tests.
2	"Windmills"	Cary Joji Fukunaga	Patrick Somerville	September 21, 2018
In a flashback, Annie smokes in her apartment by herself, crushing up one of NPB's "A" pills while cursing "This is it, this is the last one." Upon waking from her sober dream, Annie gathers her possession, a photo of a young woman, and reveals she will be going to Salt Lake City in a conversation with an AdBuddy, a person who reads off advertisements to a person in exchange for goods. With her last $20, Annie visits her father who now resides in an A-Void pod, and informs him that she will be going to Salt Lake City, leaving with all his cash and a revolver. Suffering from drug withdrawal and unable to get more from her contact, Annie visits a "DOX STOP", which is an agency that advertises to scrub personal records for a fee and blackmails these "scrubbed" personal records for a fee. Annie decides to pay for Patricia Lugo's (an NPB employee) personal information and intercept her latest appointment as her friend proxy. Even though Annie fails to maintain her act, Patricia decides to help her. When Patricia is unable to help her get in, however, Annie threatens her until Patricia takes another subject's badge and gives it to Annie. At the drug trial, after taking the "A" pill, Annie relives the traumatic death of her sister Ellie in a car accident.
3	"Having a Day"	Cary Joji Fukunaga	Patrick Somerville & Caroline Williams	September 21, 2018
Annie, Owen, and test subject 5 are removed from the group for questioning after the "A" pill test. Annie's results showed prior experience with the pills, and Owen's indicated he did not take the pill at all. Outside project director Dr. Muramoto's office, Owen confides to Annie that he refrained in case she needed to activate him, and Annie confesses that she lied about being his contact. Muramoto has Owen recount his core trauma during the session. Insisting he ingested a pill, Owen describes a family gathering that led to his attempted suicide. Muramoto disbelieves Owen and forces him to take an "A" pill. Later while questioning Annie, Muramoto falls forward and dies abruptly. Fearing dismissal, Annie and Owen remove negative indicators from their files and leave Muramoto at his desk. Owen tells Annie his actual trauma experience: a "BLIP" (psychotic break) and meeting Grimsson for the first time. After Muramoto is found dead, Dr. Fujita reenlists Dr. James Mantleray to lead the project. Mantleray created the drug but was removed due to personal issues. Mantleray informs GRTA, the super computer controlling the experiment, that Muramoto has died, and GRTA's reaction causes a hardware malfunction that links Annie and Owen during the next phase of "B" pill testing.
4	"Furs by Sebastian"	Cary Joji Fukunaga	Patrick Somerville & Nick Cuse	September 21, 2018
Annie and Owen have a shared fantasy that they are a married couple, Linda and Bruce. Linda works at a hospice and enlists Bruce's aid in tracking down Wendy, a ring-tailed lemur belonging to one of her patients, Nan. Wendy was stolen by furriers to make into a hat. Linda and Bruce are caught by the furrier and his sons who plan to make them watch them skin Wendy. The Fish and Wildlife Service arrive and get into a shootout with the furrier and his sons while Bruce and Lin escape with Wendy. Linda delivers Wendy to Nan's estranged daughter, Paula Nazlund, as instructed. Linda realizes that she gave Paula the lemur out of hate rather than love as Nan loved Wendy more than Paula. Paula informs Linda she is pregnant with a son she will call "Greg 'Fuck U Nan' Nazlund", the name of the man driving the truck that hit Annie and her sister, killing Ellie and causing Annie to blame herself. Returning home, Linda recounts a memory of her and her sister that is actually from Annie's life. At home Bruce is arrested by Fish and Wildlife, claiming he is solely responsible for stealing Wendy. He sees Grimsson watching from the street.
5	"Exactly Like You"	Cary Joji Fukunaga	Caroline Williams & Mauricio Katz	September 21, 2018
Under the influence of the "B" pill, Annie and Owen then transition into a shared fantasy where they are Arlie and Ollie, two con artist magicians in the 1940s invited to a séance at an exclusive house party. They have an ulterior motive: to find the long lost 53rd chapter of Cervantes' Don Quixote, believed to possess the power to hold people in their fantasies for an eternity. The séance, led by a humanized GRTA computer, provides a distraction for the two to search the house. All the while, Arlie's character has been randomly "zapping" out of the fantasy and into the NPB lab, where she sees visions of the real Annie's past. Back at the NPB lab, Azumi begins to notice the inconsistencies between subjects 1 and 9, realizing their unusual connection under the influence of the drugs. Annie is subsequently taken into questioning by James about her experiences with the "B" pill to see if she should continue her participation in the trial, while Owen and the rest of the subjects wake up from their tests.
6	"Larger Structural Issues"	Cary Joji Fukunaga	Patrick Somerville & Nick Cuse	September 21, 2018
Annie realizes that her experiences with Owen on the "B" pill are unique, causing her to feel close to him. Owen, however, worries that being connected to Annie in his dreams is a symptom of his schizophrenia, causing him to doubt the study. Azumi fears that Annie and Owen's connection is being caused by the GRTA computer and reveals to James that GRTA is depressed because, after Azumi coded her with basic empathy, GRTA began a workplace romance with Dr. Muramoto and is now in grief over his death. At the behest of Azumi and GRTA, James reluctantly calls in his mother, pop psychologist Dr. Greta Mantleray, with whom he has a contentious and difficult relationship, so that she can treat GRTA, whose intelligence and virtual appearance are modeled after Greta. The subjects are given the "C" pill and begin the final phase of the trial.
7	"Ceci N'est Pas Une Drill"	Cary Joji Fukunaga	Amelia Gray & Danielle Henderson	September 21, 2018
Annie dreams she is in a fantasy epic with her sister where she is a hard-drinking half-elf ranger called Annia and her sister is an elf princess named Ellia. Annia is being paid by a dying Ellia to take her to the Lake of the Clouds where the waters are rumored to cure her. Along the way they are taken to a mysterious queen who allows Annia to look in a mirror, where she sees an image of her and Ellie when they are children. Annie remembers who she is in the real world and tearfully hugs Ellia. Meanwhile, Owen dreams that he and his family are mobsters and that he is being forced to wear a wire by the police. He meets Olivia, a fellow student who also works as a waitress and a virtual version of the girl he suffered the BLIP towards, and agrees to study with her later.
8	"The Lake of the Clouds"	Cary Joji Fukunaga	Mauricio Katz & Nick Cuse	September 21, 2018
Annie is still trapped in the fantasy sequence, though now she realizes the world is a dream. She and Ellia continue their quest to find the Lake of Clouds. Ellia begins to remember things from Annie and Ellie's past as well. Owen the mobster accidentally discovers that his brother, Jed, has been working undercover for the police, but Jed is killed, leading Owen to go into witness protection. He asks Olivia to come with him, but seven children later he leaves her by jumping out a window. Remembering who he is and remembering Annie, he transforms into a hawk and travels into Annie's fantasy realm. Annia and Ellia arrive at the Lake of Clouds, which is actually the place where Ellie was killed. GRTA as Queen Gertrude arrives and offers to let Annie stay forever. Annie accepts believing that she will be able to stay with Ellie but is instead spirited away from her. Greta meanwhile learns from GRTA that she has lost faith in the value of human life after her love died and plans on keeping the subjects prisoners in their own minds, before Greta violently wakes up.
9	"Utangatta"	Cary Joji Fukunaga	Patrick Somerville	September 21, 2018
Greta tries to warn James and Azumi of the threat GRTA poses, but they do not believe her and the stress makes James go blind, which they believe to be psychosomatic. Soon after, GRTA takes control by taking over the system, locking the staff in the control room and electrocuting orderly Carl when he tries to pull the override switch. Meanwhile, Owen and Annie are in a new shared dream, where Owen is Snorri, an Icelandic UN agent accused of murdering a seemingly friendly Extraterrestrial whose family wants revenge. Before he is executed, he is saved by Annie, a CIA sleeper agent who reveals the alien was always hostile. As they go to stop the threat, they encounter Grimsson, who helps them remember who they are. Owen goes with Grimsson while Annie goes on her own to find Ellie. On the way, she meets GRTA's projection, who she convinces to live with her pain instead of lashing out. In doing so, she is able to say goodbye to Ellie, who leaves with GRTA. Owen completes his mission by solving a Rubik's Cube, which frees the controllers in the real world. This makes Grimsson disappear, seemingly for good, and allows Azumi and James, whose eyesight comes back, to shut GRTA down permanently.
10	"Option C"	Cary Joji Fukunaga	Patrick Somerville & Cary Joji Fukunaga	September 21, 2018
After the subjects wake up, the experiment ends and they are allowed to go home with their payment. As they say goodbye, Owen assures a confused Annie that he will not pursue a relationship with her. For the mistakes they have made, James and Azumi are fired from Neberdine and told off by both Greta and Neberdine's CEO. While leaving, they rekindle their former relationship. Annie decides to go to Salt Lake City and makes amends with her father, who has decided to leave the A-Void pod. Realizing how fond she has become of him, she decides to invite Owen along. However, she learns from a newspaper that he told the truth at Jed's trial and has been subsequently committed to a mental asylum. Owen can only see two options for their relationship: Option A, in which Annie will turn out to not be real, and Option B, which he does not elaborate on. Annie sneaks into the asylum, finds him, and smuggles him out of the institution. Owen is convinced the treatment did not work and is certain that he will have another BLIP and cause her to leave (Option B). Annie tells him she will never do that, and they head to Salt Lake together.

== Production ==
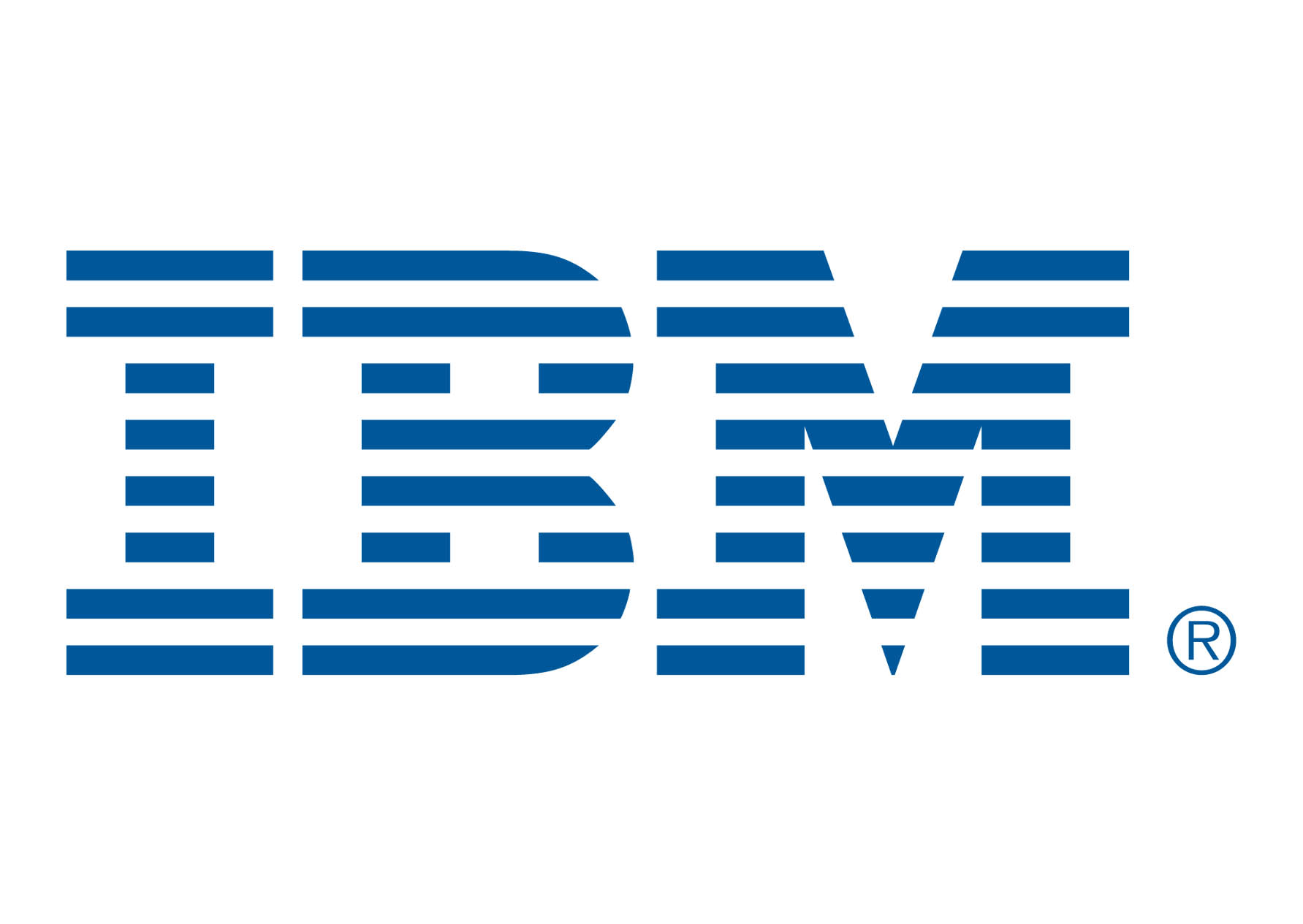
The IBM logo, which was the inspiration for the Maniac logo as well as the fictional Neberdine Pharmaceutical Biotech company.

=== Development ===
The series was officially announced in March 2016, with Netflix ordering the production straight-to-series that same month. On March 18, 2016, it was announced that Paramount Television and Anonymous Content were producing a television series to be directed by Cary Joji Fukunaga. The half-hour dark comedy series was reported to be executive produced by Fukunaga, Emma Stone, Jonah Hill, Michael Sugar, and Doug Wald. Ashley Zalta was also announced as a co-executive producer. At the time, the series was being shopped to various networks and was searching for a writer. Less than a week later, it was announced that Netflix was finalizing a deal for a straight-to-series order for a first season consisting of ten episodes. On October 21, 2016, it was announced that Patrick Somerville would write the series. On July 29, 2018, it was announced during the annual Television Critics Association's summer press tour that the series would premiere on September 21, 2018.

=== Casting ===
Alongside the initial series announcement, it was reported that Emma Stone and Jonah Hill were finalizing deals to star in the series. In August 2017, it was announced that Sonoya Mizuno had been cast as a series regular and that Justin Theroux and Julia Garner would appear in a recurring capacity. On September 13, 2017, it was reported that Jemima Kirke had been cast in a recurring role. On October 5, 2017, it was announced that Sally Field had joined the cast in a recurring role. On February 23, 2018, it was reported Billy Magnussen had been cast in the series.

=== Filming ===
Principal photography for the series began on August 15, 2017, in New York City and was expected to conclude by the end of November 2017.

=== Music ===
Dan Romer composed the soundtrack to Maniac with collection of orchestral and electronic musical pieces. The soundtrack was released on a double LP by Waxwork Records on January 10, 2020.

== Release ==
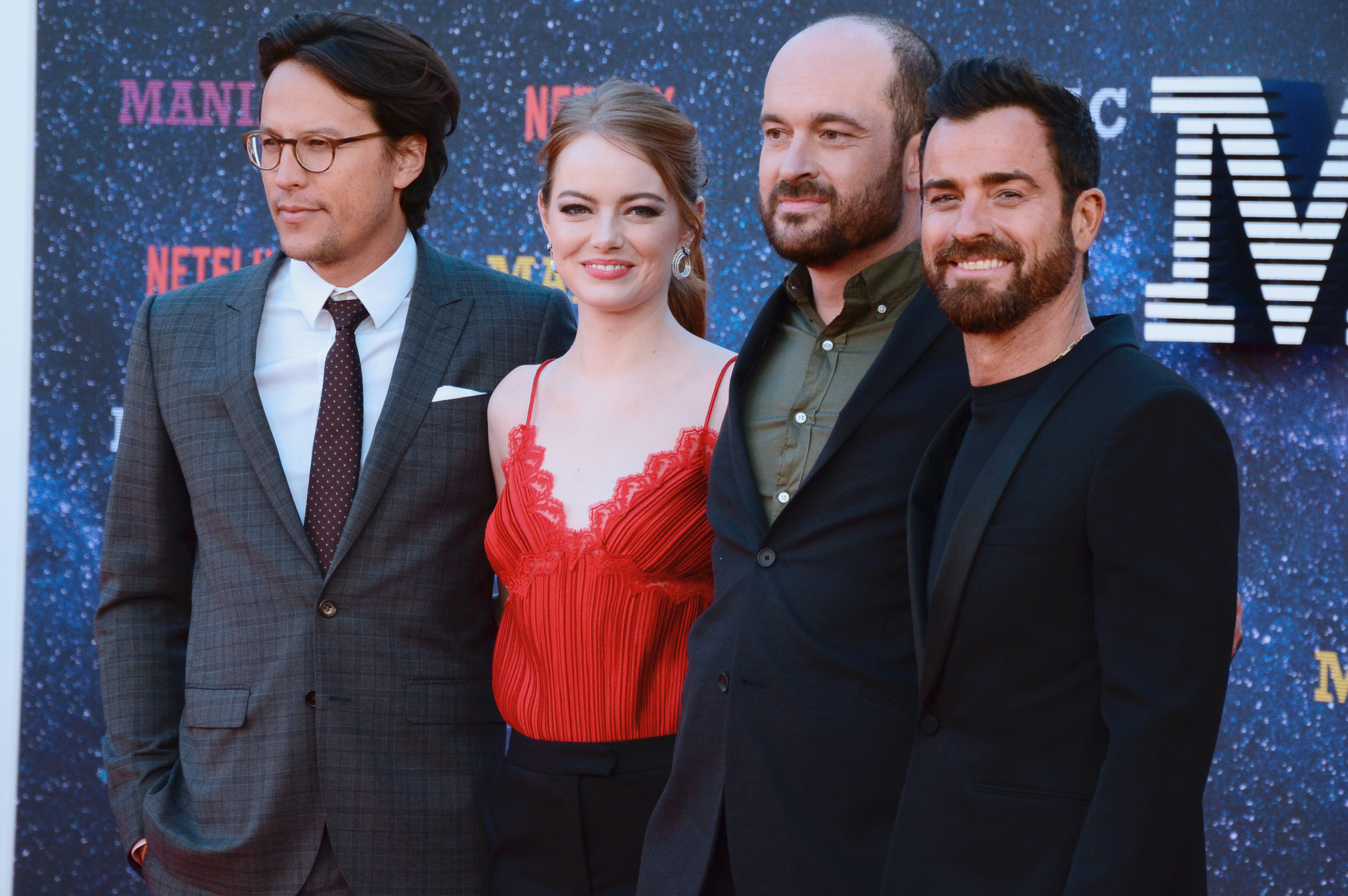
Cary Joji Fukunaga (director), Emma Stone (lead actress), Patrick Somerville (creator), and Justin Theroux (actor) at the premiere of Maniac in London

On September 13, 2018, the series held its world premiere at the Southbank Centre in London, England. On September 20, 2018, the series held its American premiere at Center 415 in Manhattan, New York.

== Reception ==
=== Critical response ===
The series was met with a positive response from critics. On the review aggregation website Rotten Tomatoes, the series holds an 85% approval rating, with an average rating of 7.6 out of 10 based on 104 reviews. The website's critical consensus reads, "Maniac enthralls with its dazzling visuals, adventurous narrative, and striking performances from both Emma Stone and Jonah Hill." Metacritic, which uses a weighted average, assigned the series a score of 76 out of 100 based on 24 critics, indicating "generally favorable reviews".

In a positive review, Variety's Daniel D'Addario commended the series saying, "The beautifully made Maniac plunges viewers into a fictional world that's both divergent from our own and instantly recognizable—and then reinvents itself several times over, skittering across time, space and genre to tell a story of connection that feels urgent and deeply, painfully human...As a trial of something new, Maniac passes every test, and ascends instantly to take its place among the very best TV of the year." In another favorable assessment, The Washington Post's Hank Stuever described the series as "oddly mesmerizing" and offered it qualified praise saying, "Maniac starts off too absorbed in its own complicated structure, but once Owen and Annie are strapped in at the lab (and experience an accidental melding of their subconscious states), the show becomes a visually compelling romp through highly detailed dreams and personal discoveries." Describing it as "exhilarating to watch and a lot to process", Vulture's Jen Chaney called the series "one of the fall season's best".

In a more negative critique, Darren Franich of Entertainment Weekly awarded the series a grade of "C−", saying, "For all its manic poses and deflationary snark, it's ultimately patronizingly sentimental. [...] Maniac asks big questions about reality, and then settles for the limpest possible cinematic representations of that reality."

=== Awards and nominations ===
Award	Category	Nominee(s)	Result	Ref.
Art Directors Guild Awards	Excellence in Production Design for a Television Movie or Limited Series	Alex Digerlando	Nominated	
Directors Guild of America Awards	Outstanding Directorial Achievement in Movies for Television and Limited Series	Cary Joji Fukunaga	Nominated	
Golden Reel Awards	Broadcast Media: Short Form Music / Musical	Episode 2: "Windmills"	Nominated	
Producers Guild of America Awards	Outstanding Producer of Limited Series Television	Patrick Somerville, Cary Joji Fukunaga, Michael Sugar, Doug Wald, Jonah Hill, Emma Stone, Pal Kristiansen, Anne Kolbjørnsen, Espen Huseby, Carol Cuddy, Mauricio Katz, Caroline Williams, Ashley Zalta, Jessica Levin & Jon Mallard	Nominated	
Satellite Awards	Best Actress – Miniseries or Television Film	Emma Stone	Nominated	
Screen Actors Guild Awards	Outstanding Performance by a Female Actor in a Miniseries or Television Movie	Emma Stone	Nominated	
Writers Guild of America Awards	Television: Long Form – Adapted	Nick Cuse, Cary Joji Fukunaga, Amelia Gray, Danielle Henderson, Mauricio Katz, Patrick Somerville & Caroline Williams	Nominated	
