= Ellen Perry =

American film director

- Born: , U.S.
- Education: USC School of Cinematic Arts
- Occupations: Film director; screenwriter; producer
- Years active: 2000–present
- Awards: Berkeley Film Festival

Ellen Perry is an American film director, writer, producer and cinematographer. She attended the USC School of Cinematic Arts.

Her first feature documentary, Great Wall Across the Yangtze, aired nationally on PBS in 2000. Narrated by Martin Sheen, the film investigates the Three Gorges Dam project, on China's Yangtze River. It won the Grand Festival Award at the Berkeley Film Festival.

Her documentary film on the Peruvian president Alberto Fujimori, The Fall of Fujimori, garnered much acclaim. The film premiered at the Sundance Film Festival in 2005. The Fall of Fujimori was nominated for an Emmy for Best Feature Documentary in 2006.

It was also nominated for the Writers Guild of America Award for Best Documentary Screenplay in 2005 and was an official selection at over 30 film festivals worldwide. The Fall of Fujimori was awarded the CINE Golden Eagle, Grand Jury Prize at the Independent Film Festival of Boston, Special Jury Prize at the Milan International Film Festival, Director's Choice at the Biografilm Festival and Audience Choice at the Toronto International Latin Film Festival.

In making the film, she achieved personal access to Alberto Fujimori, despite his living in exile for his being wanted on criminal charges in Peru in regard to human rights violations. It was characterized by one critic as "brilliant, revelatory and entertaining".

== Selected filmography ==
- Will (2011)
- Great Wall Across the Yangtze (2000)
- The Fall of Fujimori (2005)
