= Butcher's Crossing (film) =

2022 film by Gabe Polsky

- Theatrical release poster
- Directed by: Gabe Polsky
- Screenplay by: Gabe Polsky; Liam Satre-Meloy
- Based on: Butcher's Crossing by John Edward Williams
- Produced by: Gabe Polsky; Molly Conners; Amanda Bowers; Will Clarke; Andy Mayson; Jeri Rafter
- Starring: Nicolas Cage; Fred Hechinger; Xander Berkeley; Rachel Keller; Jeremy Bobb; Paul Raci
- Cinematography: David Gallego
- Edited by: Nick Pezzillo
- Music by: Leo Birenberg
- Production companies: Altitude Film Entertainment; Gabe Polsky Productions; Phiphen Pictures; Ingenious Media; Saturn Films
- Distributed by: Saban Films
- Release dates: September 9, 2022 (TIFF); October 20, 2023 (United States)
- Running time: 107 minutes
- Country: United States
- Language: English
- Box office: $15,648

Butcher's Crossing is a 2023 American Western film directed by Gabe Polsky in his narrative feature film debut, based on the 1960 novel by John Edward Williams. It stars Nicolas Cage, Fred Hechinger, Xander Berkeley, Rachel Keller, Jeremy Bobb, and Paul Raci.

It had its world premiere at the Toronto International Film Festival on September 9, 2022 and was released in the United States on October 20, 2023 by Saban Films.

== Plot ==
In 1874, Will Andrews, the naive and idealistic son of a pastor, has dropped out of Harvard and travelled to Butcher's Crossing, a tiny frontier town in Kansas built on the buffalo hide trade. Sold on the romanticism of going on a buffalo hunt, Will falls in with Miller, an intense and stoic but experienced buffalo hunter who spins him a tale of a remote Colorado pass where one of the few remaining massive herds can be found. Though warned about Miller and the folly of this enterprise, Will puts up all of his money to fund the expedition.

With Will's money, they purchase supplies and hire Charlie Hoge, a drunk, one armed, bible-thumper, to be wagon driver and camp cook, and Fred Schneider, a brash, but pragmatic, 'skinner' who insists on being paid a salary due to his doubts about Miller's stories.

After an arduous journey that takes them to the brink of death, the party eventually reach the mountain pass to discover an untouched herd with thousands of buffalo.

Miller begins his hunt and kills hundreds of buffalo a day, leaving Will and Schneider scrambling to skin the carcasses. Despite advisement against this, Miller refuses to slow down, while Will becomes numb to the methodical slaughter.

After three weeks of constant butchery, Schneider points out that they have overstayed their intended time and already have more hides than they can carry. He proposes they stop and return before the weather turns and they become trapped. Miller refuses and Will sides with him.

As a result of this, the team become trapped by a blizzard. They are now forced to live out the winter in the mountains for several months. Frustrated, Schneider lashes out at Hoge and burns his bible. In revenge, Hoge poisons Schneider's food. Will's sanity slips further and Miller obsesses over the triumph of returning to town with the largest haul ever seen once he's killed every single buffalo. The team settles in to endure a long, boring slog of survival as they wait the winter out.

When spring comes, Schneider realizes that Hoge was poisoning him and kills him. Unable to haul all of the 4,600 hides they have collected, they pile 1,600 in their wagon and leave the remaining 3,000 with the intent to return for them. During the journey back, their damaged wagon falls off a cliff, taking Schneider and the 1,600 hides with it, as Miller and Will numbly stare on.

Will and Miller return to town, only to find it largely abandoned and derelict. The two are horrified to learn that the bottom has fallen out of the buffalo hide market while they were trapped for the winter and the hides were now completely worthless.

Robbed of his victory, Miller sets the old buffalo exchange building on fire. When asked if the experience was worth it, a dishevelled Will says that he has "seen what [he] needed to see" on the buffalo hunt and rides into the wilderness, alone.

== Cast ==
- Nicolas Cage as Miller
- Fred Hechinger as Will Andrews
- Jeremy Bobb as Fred Schneider
- Paul Raci as McDonald
- Xander Berkeley as Charlie Hoge
- Rachel Keller as Francine

== Production ==
Principal photography began in Montana in October 2021.

== Release ==
In September 2021, it was announced that Saban Films had acquired North American, Australia, New Zealand, South Africa, France, Germany, Austria, Switzerland and Scandinavia distribution rights to the film, while Altitude Film Distribution was handling international sales and distributing the film in the UK and Ireland.

Butcher's Crossing had its world premiere at the Toronto International Film Festival on September 9, 2022. It was theatrically released in the United States on October 20, 2023.

=== Box office ===
As of January 26, 2024, Butcher's Crossing grossed $15,648, in the United Arab Emirates.

=== Critical response ===
On the review aggregator website Rotten Tomatoes, 74% of 61 critics' reviews are positive, with an average rating of 5.9/10. The website's consensus reads: "Butcher's Crossing benefits from Nicolas Cage's lead turn, which helps make this largely boilerplate Western more compelling than not." Metacritic, which uses a weighted average, assigned the film a score of 55 out of 100, based on 14 critics, indicating "mixed or average" reviews.
