= The Imperial (The Delines album) =

Studio album by the Delines
- Released: January 11, 2019
- Genres: Country, soul
- Length: 41:29
- Label: Decor

The Delines chronology
Scenic Sessions (2015)	The Imperial (2019)	The Sea Drift (2022)

Professional ratings
Aggregate scores
Source	Rating
AnyDecentMusic?	7.9/10
Metacritic	84/100
Review scores
Source	Rating
AllMusic	4/5 stars
Financial Times	4/5 stars
The Line of Best Fit	8/10
Mojo	4/5 stars
Q	4/5 stars
Uncut	8/10
Vice (Expert Witness)	A−

The Imperial is the second studio album by American band the Delines. It was released on January 11, 2019 though Decor Records.

== Track listing ==
No.	Title	Length
1.	"Cheer Up Charley"	3:26
2.	"The Imperial"	5:23
3.	"Where Are You Sonny?"	3:58
4.	"Let's Be Us Again"	4:00
5.	"Roll Back My Life"	3:30
6.	"Eddie & Polly"	4:05
7.	"Holly the Hustle"	5:46
8.	"That Old Haunted Place"	3:05
9.	"He Don't Burn for Me"	5:13
10.	"Waiting on the Blue"	3:03

== Charts ==
Chart (2019)	Peak position
Dutch Albums (Album Top 100)	92
