= Danielle Henderson (writer) =

American writer

- Born: Warwick, New York, United States
- Occupation: Writer
- Years active: 2011― present
- Known for: Feminist Ryan Gosling
- Notable work: The Ugly Cry: A Memoir (2021)

Danielle Henderson is an American writer. She is best known as the creator of the "Feminist Ryan Gosling" blog and book of the same name. Henderson has written for the television shows Difficult People, Maniac, Divorce, and others.

== Early life and education ==
Henderson was raised in Warwick, New York, first by her mother and then from age 10, by her grandmother. She and her brother were some of the only Black children in the predominantly white village.

Henderson attended college for a year before dropping out. She spent time living in Anchorage, Alaska and also worked for the United Nations. In 2008 she went back to school and received her bachelor's degree from University of Rhode Island in 2011. She received her master's degree in women and gender studies from the University of Wisconsin-Madison. She briefly enrolled in a doctoral program before dropping out.

== Career ==
In October 2011, Henderson created a Tumblr called "Feminist Ryan Gosling" after seeing the popular "hey girl" meme that featured actor Ryan Gosling. Each post included a picture of the actor with the greeting "hey girl" at the top and a block of text related to feminist theory or scholarship that Henderson was studying in her master's degree program. The day after she published the debut post, the blog went viral after receiving coverage first from Jezebel, and later from outlets such as GQ, Mother Jones, IndieWire, Time, and Newsweek. She published a book version of the blog in August 2012 and retired the project in April 2013.

Henderson was a writer and editor for Rookie from 2012 to 2013 and also recapped television programs for Vulture. In 2014 she worked as the arts and culture editor for The Stranger and later worked as a culture editor for Fusion.

Henderson was contacted by a television agent who read her Vulture recaps and encouraged her to consider television writing. She transitioned to screenwriting and has written for the television shows Difficult People, Divorce, Maniac, and Dare Me.

She released her memoir The Ugly Cry on June 8, 2021, under Penguin/Viking. The book centers much of her upbringing by her non-traditional grandmother, as well as other life experiences up to the age of 18.

== Personal life ==
Henderson resides in upstate New York as of 2021.

== Works ==
- 2012. Feminist Ryan Gosling: Feminist Theory (as Imagined) from Your Favorite Sensitive Movie Dude, publication date 14 August 2012, Running Press. ISBN 978-0762447367
- 2021. The Ugly Cry: A Memoir, publication date 8 June 2021, Viking Press. ISBN 978-0525559351

== Awards and nominations ==
- 2019 – Nominee, Writers Guild of America Award for Television: Long Form – Adapted (for Maniac)
