= In Search of Greatness =

2018 American sports documentary film by Gabe Polsky

- Theatrical release poster
- Directed by: Gabe Polsky
- Written by: Gabe Polsky
- Produced by: Gabe Polsky
- Starring: Wayne Gretzky; Pelé; Jerry Rice
- Cinematography: Svetlana Cvetko
- Edited by: Marco Capalbo
- Music by: Leo Birenberg
- Production companies: Gabriel Polsky Productions; IMG Films
- Distributed by: Art of Sport
- Release dates: October 19, 2018 (Chicago International Film Festival); November 2, 2018 (United States)
- Running time: 79 minutes
- Country: United States
- Language: English

In Search of Greatness is a 2018 American sports documentary film produced, written and directed by Gabe Polsky. It premiered at the Chicago International Film Festival, and was released in the United States on November 2, 2018, by Art of Sport. Featuring original interviews with famous sporting-world figures Wayne Gretzky, Jerry Rice, and Pelé, In Search of Greatness explores the role of creativity in the careers of the world's greatest athletes, both historical and contemporary. The movie also features interviews with authors and creativity experts Ken Robinson and David Epstein.

Some well-known sports personalities spotlighted in the film are Serena Williams, Tom Brady, Muhammad Ali, Rocky Marciano, Red Auerbach, and Michael Jordan. A number of major cultural figures' careers are also highlighted for comparison to those of top athletes, including The Beatles, David Bowie and Jimi Hendrix.

In April 2018, The Hollywood Reporter published an article upon the release of the film's first trailer, calling In Search of Greatness "an early contender for the best documentary feature Oscar." The film was later nominated for Best Documentary Screenplay from the Writers Guild of America.

During an April 2018 interview with Sports Illustrated discussing what inspired the film, Polsky said "Every boy and girl has their own variables, their own creative abilities. And I think everyone needs to find their own creative abilities because that's what separates you from everybody else. That's your competitive advantage...Kids who have potential are often put to the side, and we leave a lot on the table."

In Search of Greatness is a co-production with IMG Films.
