= The Delines =

American band

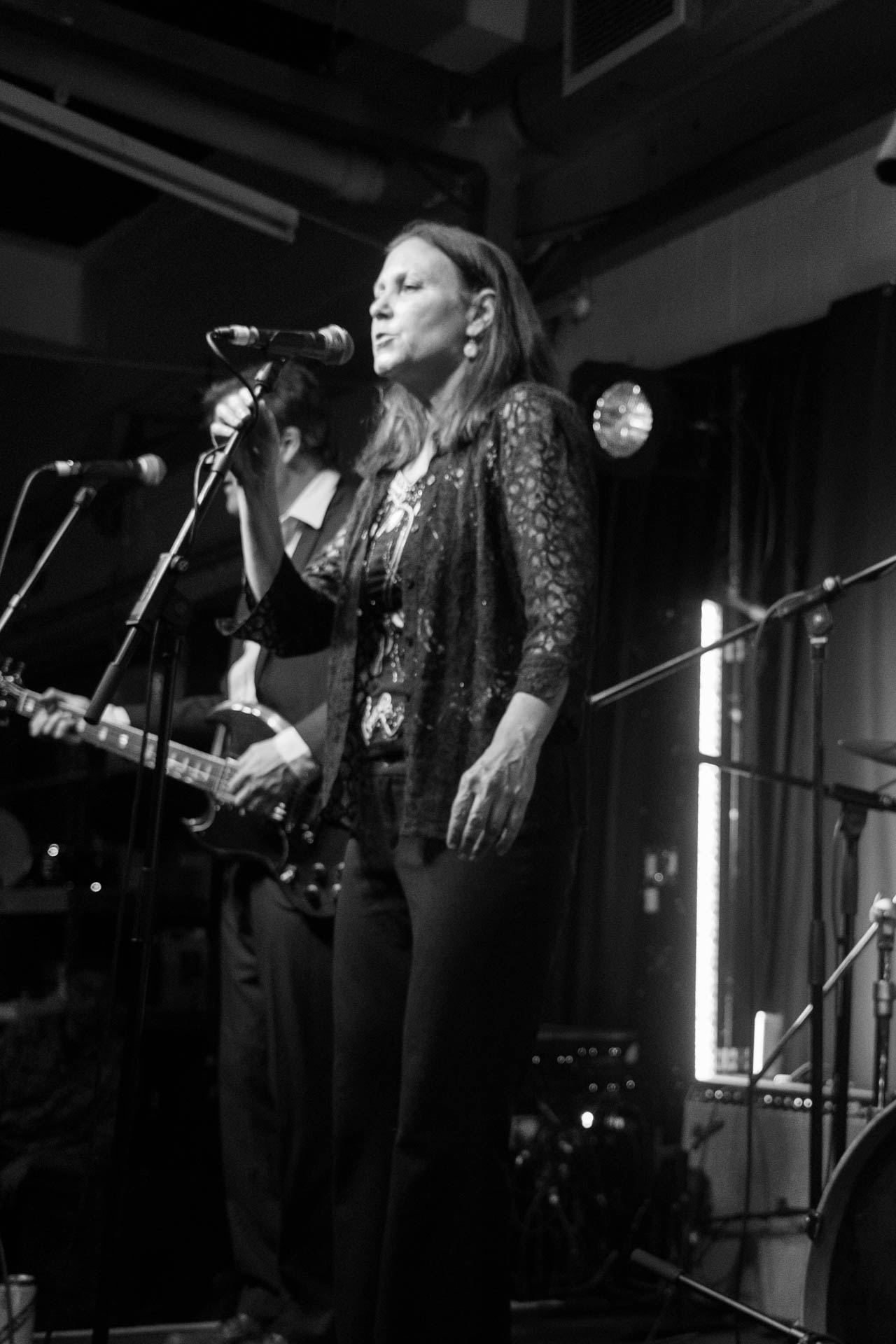
- at Rough Trade East in 2022

Background information
- Origin: Portland, Oregon, United States
- Genres: Alternative country, country soul, Americana
- Years active: 2012–present
- Labels: Decor, El Cortez
- Website: TheDelines.com

The Delines are an American band from Portland, Oregon. Their original line-up was vocalist Amy Boone, Jenny Conlee (The Decemberists) on keyboards, Sean Oldham, Freddy Trujillo, Willy Vlautin (Richmond Fontaine) and pedal steel player Tucker Jackson (Minus 5). The band was formed in 2012 and is self-described as a "retro country soul band".

== History ==
The Delines were formed when singer Amy Boone was touring with Richmond Fontaine and singing the female parts from that band's 2003 album, Post to Wire, which had been performed by her sister Deborah Kelly. Kelly and Boone had been in the Texas band the Damnations. Vlautin then formed the Delines, centred on Boone's evocative world-weary and vulnerable vocals. They gathered in Portland, Oregon with producer John Askew to cut the band's debut album, Colfax. The songs on Colfax, which was released in June 2014, combined Vlautin's admired lyrics about characters from America's hinterland and their everyday struggles, with Boone's vocals, the emotion of which wrings out the pain of the characters. Colfax was well received by the critics and scored 87 on Metacritic with seven positive reviews.

Following the release of Colfax the band embarked on a European tour including shows at the End Of The Road and Kilkenny Festivals. They have since toured in North America and Australasia, and returned to Europe. A second album, Scenic Sessions, was released as a limited edition CD for sale only on the 2015 European tour and from the band's website. This ten-song album had seven songs by Vlautin, a song written by Cory Gray and another by Amy Boone, as well as a cover of Sunshine by Sparklehorse. Amy Boone was involved in a car accident in March 2016 and the band planned to record again when she had recovered.

The band's second album proper, The Imperial, and a single from the album, "Eddie and Polly", were both released in January 2019. They also announced a European tour for the beginning of 2019 including a sold out show at the Union Chapel in London . The Imperial debuted at number 1 for two weeks in the UK official Americana charts and was nearly as well received as their debut album, scoring 84 on Metacritic from six reviews.

The band released their third album The Sea Drift in January 2022, which topped year-end polls in many countries including Heaven magazine in the Netherlands, Americana UK, number 11 in Uncut, top 20 in Rolling Stone France, El Pais and a host of others. They toured the UK three times over that year as well as dates across Europe and Australia including performances at Crossing Border, Kilkenny and Into the Great Wide Open Festivals.

== Members ==
The current members of The Delines are:

- Amy Boone – vocals, guitar
- Cory Gray – keyboards, trumpet
- Sean Oldham – percussion, vocals
- Freddy Trujillo – bass, vocals
- Willy Vlautin – guitar, vocals

== Discography ==
- Colfax (2014)
- Scenic Sessions (2015)
- The Imperial (2019)
- The Sea Drift (2022)
- The Night Always Comes (2023)
- Mr. Luck and Ms. Doom (2025)
- The Set Up (2026)
