= Amelia Gray =

American writer (born 1982)

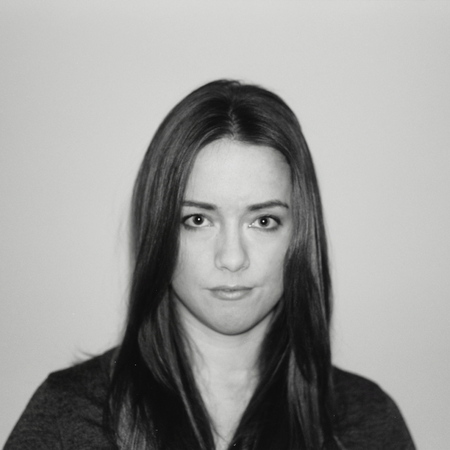
- Gray in 2011
- Born: August 17, 1982 (age 44); Tucson, Arizona, U.S.
- Education: Arizona State University (BA); Texas State University (MFA)
- Occupations: Novelist; Screenwriter
- Spouse: Lee Shipman (2019-present)
- Writing career
- Period: 2009–present
- Website: www.ameliagray.com

Amelia Gray (born August 17, 1982) is an American writer. She is the author of the short story collections AM/PM (Featherproof Books), Museum of the Weird (Fiction Collective Two), and Gutshot (Farrar, Straus and Giroux), and the novels THREATS (Farrar, Straus and Giroux), and Isadora (Farrar, Straus and Giroux). Gray has been shortlisted for the PEN/Faulkner Award for Fiction and her television writing has been nominated for a WGA Award.

The New York Times called Gray's stories "leaps of faith, brave excursions into the realms of the unreal." while the Los Angeles Times defined her style as "akin to the alternately seething and absurd moods of David Lynch and Cronenberg." Of THREATS, NPR said: "Amelia Gray's psychological thriller takes us to the brink between reality and delusion."

== Bibliography ==
=== Novels ===
- THREATS (Farrar, Straus and Giroux, 2012)
- Isadora (Farrar, Straus and Giroux, 2017)

=== Short story collections ===
- AM/PM (Featherproof Books, 2009)
- Museum of the Weird (Fiction Collective Two, 2010)
- Gutshot (Farrar, Straus and Giroux, 2015)

=== Other short stories ===
- "Labyrinth"
- "How He Felt"
- "Device"
- "The Swan as Metaphor for Love"
- "These Are the Fables"
- "The Inheritance"
- "The Odds"

== Filmography ==
=== Television ===
- Mr. Robot (2017–2018)
- Maniac (2018)
- Gaslit (2022)

=== Short films ===
- "Curated" (dir. Gillian Jacobs) (2018)
- "Waste" (dir. Justine Raczkiewicz) (2017)

== Video games ==
- Telling Lies (2019)
- Immortality (2022)

== Awards and honors ==
=== Winner ===
- 2010: Ronald Sukenick Innovative Fiction Award
- 2016: New York Public Library Young Lions Fiction Award
- 2023: BAFTA Immortality (video game)

=== Nominated ===
- 2008: Amanda Davis Highwire shortlist
- 2008: DIAGRAM Innovative Fiction finalist
- 2012: Dylan Thomas Prize longlist
- 2012: PEN/Faulkner Award for Fiction shortlist
- 2016: Shirley Jackson Award for Collection
- 2019: WGA Award (Adapted Long Form) with Nick Cuse, Cary Joji Fukunaga, Danielle Henderson, Mauricio Katz, Patrick Somerville, and Caroline Williams
