= Gabe Polsky =

American film producer (born 1979)

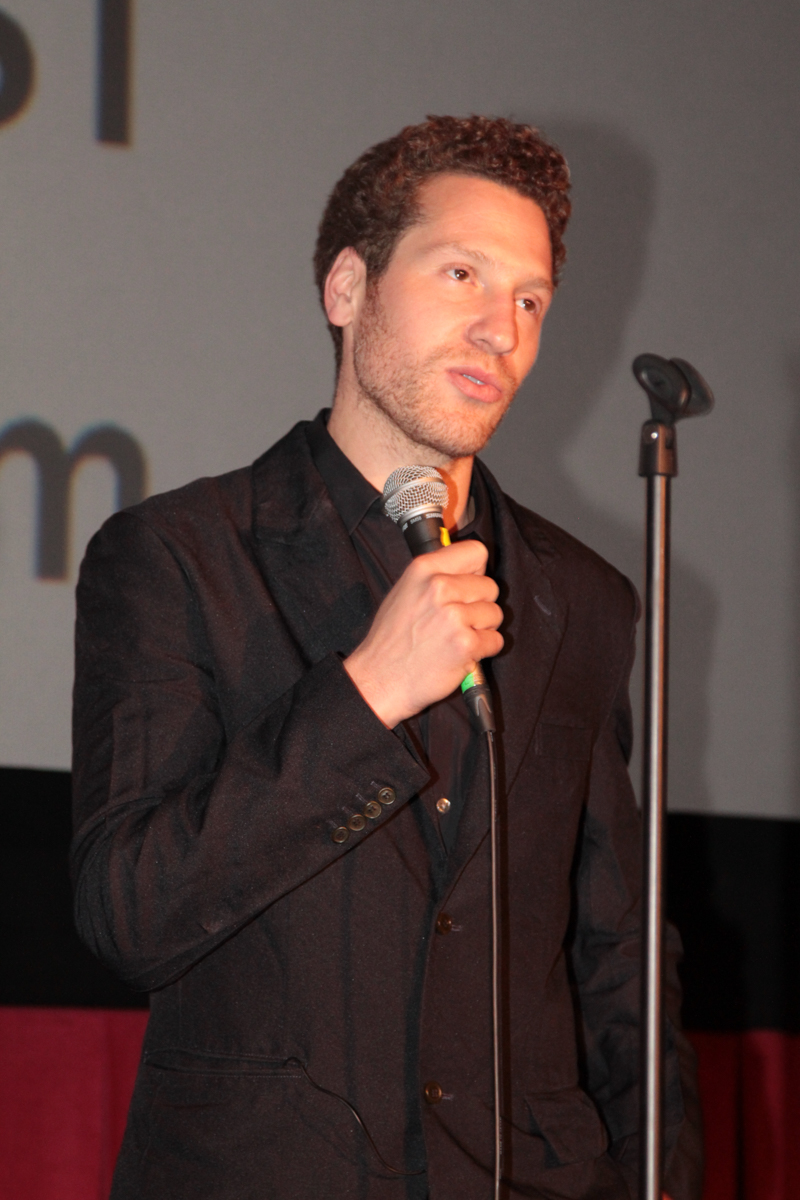
- Gabe Polsky speaking at the premiere of Red Army at the 2014 AFI Film Festival
- Born: May 3, 1979 (age 46)
- Occupations: Film director; writer; producer
- Website: gabepolskyproductions.com

Gabe Polsky (born May 3, 1979) is an American film director, producer, and writer best known for the documentaries Red Army (2014) and In Search of Greatness (2018). His work has premiered at major international festivals including the Cannes Film Festival, the Toronto International Film Festival (TIFF), the Telluride Film Festival, and the New York Film Festival.

== Early life ==
Gabe Polsky was born on May 3, 1979, to Ukrainian immigrants in Illinois, and he was primarily raised in the Chicago area. He attended the Hotchkiss School. After graduating, he attended Yale University, where he played NCAA hockey. He competed on Team USA in hockey at the 1997 Maccabiah Games in Israel, winning a silver medal.

== Career ==
In 2009, Polsky was among the producers on the Werner Herzog film Bad Lieutenant: Port of Call New Orleans. In 2011, he and his brother Alan Polsky were among the producers of Little Birds, an indie/drama film loosely based on the 1979 short story collection Little Birds by Anaïs Nin. Later that year, Polsky produced His Way, a documentary about film producer Jerry Weintraub that was released on HBO.

Polsky and his brother Alan co-directed and produced The Motel Life (2012), based on the 2007 novel The Motel Life by Willy Vlautin. Polsky then wrote, directed, and produced Red Army (2014), a documentary about the Soviet Union men's national ice hockey team, which premiered at the Cannes Film Festival.

Polsky and his brother Alan acquired the rights to the Einstein estate and the book Einstein: His Life and Universe by Walter Isaacson, and they were among the executive producers of the Genius series on National Geographic in 2017. Polsky wrote, directed, and produced the sports documentaries In Search of Greatness (2018), Red Penguins (2019), and the episode "Red Penguins: Murder, Money and Ice Hockey" in season 24 of Storyville.

With Liam Satre Meloy, Polsky directed Butcher's Crossing (2022), an adaptation of the John Williams novel, Butcher's Crossing, starring Nicolas Cage alongside Fred Hechinger. The film premiered at the Toronto International Film Festival.

Polsky directed, wrote, and produced the documentary The Man Who Saves the World? in 2025.

== Filmography ==
Year	Title	Role(s)	Notes
2009	Bad Lieutenant: Port of Call New Orleans	Producer	Producer credit confirmed in trade databases.
2011	Little Birds	Producer	Sundance title; producers include Jamie Patricof, Alan Polsky, Gabe Polsky.
2011	His Way (TV documentary)	Producer	HBO documentary about Jerry Weintraub; producer credit includes Gabe Polsky
2012	The Motel Life	Co-director, producer	Feature co-directed by Alan and Gabe Polsky.
2014	Red Army	Writer, director, producer	Premiered in Cannes Special Screenings; won audience awards at AFI Fest, Chicago, and Middleburg.
2017	Genius (TV series)	Executive producer	Series received 10 Primetime Emmy nominations (season 1).
2018	In Search of Greatness	Writer, director, producer	Nominated for WGA Documentary Screenplay.
2019	Red Penguins	Writer, director, producer	World premiere at TIFF 2019; U.S. release via Universal (2020).
2022	Butcher's Crossing	Director	World premiere at TIFF 2022; U.S. theatrical release October 20, 2023 (Saban Films).
2025	The Man Who Saves the World?	Director, writer, producer	Limited U.S. theatrical release scheduled for October 17, 2025 (Area 23a).
