= Will (2011 film) =

2011 British film by Ellen Perry

- Theatrical release poster
- Directed by: Ellen Perry
- Written by: Zack Anderson; Ellen Perry
- Starring: Damian Lewis; Jane March; Bob Hoskins; Kristian Kiehling
- Cinematography: Oliver Stapleton
- Edited by: Derek Burgess; Lesley Walker
- Music by: Nigel Clarke; Michael Csányi-Wills
- Release date: 4 November 2011
- Running time: 98 minutes
- Country: United Kingdom
- Language: English
- Budget: £8 million
- Box office: £24 million

Will is a 2011 British sports drama directed by Ellen Perry and starring Damian Lewis, Perry Eggleton and Bob Hoskins.

== Plot ==
The film centres on the trials and tribulations in the lives of two main fictional characters: eleven-year-old Will Brennan and Bosnian footballer Alek, and their trek to see Liverpool play Milan in the 2005 Champions League Final at the Atatürk Olympic Stadium in Istanbul.

Brennan is Liverpool's number one fan, able to recite facts ad infinitum about the club. He attends and boards at a public school in the south of England since his father Gareth (Damian Lewis) is emotionally unable to care for him following the death of Will's mother. Gareth appears one day out of the blue with tickets for Liverpool's trip to the Champions League Final.

Unknown to Will, his father has health problems and suddenly dies. Will thinks that the adults in his life are conspiring to quash his wish to get to the match to honour his father. Two of his mates at school decided to start Will on his way for reason of their own.

The school reports Will missing, which becomes worldwide news. along the way, he encounters others who support Liverpool or the game of football. One of these is Alek, in Paris. The Bosnian man had stopped playing the sport following a tragic incident because of his actions in his hometown during the Bosnian War.

Alek is initially reluctant to get involved, but a friend encourages him to recover from his personal demons by helping Will reach his destination. The two are off on the final leg of the journey, stopping along the way in Alek's hometown, where they elude police.

They reach Istanbul but do not have tickets for the match. Liverpool stars Kenny Dalglish, Steven Gerrard and Jamie Carragher recognise Alek and come to the rescue, making it possible for Will to realise his dream. His experiences have been even larger than he could have imagined, given his father's original plans. At the end of the movie, it was revealed that Liverpool won the tournament after winning 3–2 on penalties after a 3–3 draw in 90 minutes and extra time.

== Partial cast ==
- Damian Lewis as Gareth
- Perry Eggleton as Will
- Kieran Wallbanks as Simon
- Brandon Robinson as Richie
- Jane March as Sister Noell
- Bob Hoskins as Davey
- Kristian Kiehling as Alek
- Alice Krige as Sister Carmel
- Rebekah Staton as Nancy
- Mark Dymond as Detective
- Ralph Amoussou as Serge
- Branko Tomović as Avdo Bilic
- Canan Ergüder as Mina Bilic
- Malcolm Storry as Finch
- Neil Fitzmaurice as Fitzy
- John May as Barney
- Jamie Carragher as Himself
- Steven Gerrard as Himself
- Kenny Dalglish as Himself

== Filming locations ==
The production filmed in Kent in May 2010 at the Port of Ramsgate, the Port of Dover and the White Cliffs of Dover. These locations are featured at the start of Will's journey to Istanbul. He smuggles onto a freight lorry in order to cross the sea to France.

== Reception ==
On Rotten Tomatoes, the film has a score of 0% based on 5 critic reviews.

== See also ==
- List of association football films
