= The Motel Life (film) =

- Theatrical release poster
- Directed by: Alan Polsky; Gabriel Polsky
- Screenplay by: Noah Harpster; Micah Fitzerman-Blue
- Based on: The Motel Life by Willy Vlautin
- Produced by: Alan Polsky; Gabriel Polsky; Ann Ruark
- Starring: Emile Hirsch; Stephen Dorff; Dakota Fanning; Kris Kristofferson
- Cinematography: Roman Vasyanov
- Edited by: Hughes Winborne
- Music by: Keefus Ciancia; David Holmes
- Production company: Polsky Films
- Distributed by: Random Media
- Release dates: November 16, 2012 (Roma Film Festival); November 8, 2013
- Running time: 90 minutes
- Country: United States
- Language: English

The Motel Life is a 2012 American drama film starring Emile Hirsch, Stephen Dorff, Dakota Fanning, and Kris Kristofferson. Directed and produced by brothers Alan and Gabriel Polsky, the screenplay was adapted by Noah Harpster and Micah Fitzerman-Blue from Willy Vlautin's novel of the same name. The film was shot in Gardnerville, Minden, Reno, and Virginia City, Nevada, and also features animated sequences drawn by Mike Smith.

== Plot ==
In 1990, Frank and Jerry Lee Flannigan, brothers who drift aimlessly between odd jobs, attempt to escape their seemingly hopeless lives through their creativity, and excessive drinking. When Jerry Lee strikes and kills a child in a hit-and-run car accident, the two immediately pack up their belongings and leave Reno. However, Jerry Lee abandons his brother at a diner, burns up the car, and steals his sometime girlfriend Polly's pistol. Very depressed, Jerry Lee loses his nerve before he can commit suicide, and instead shoots himself in the leg, which was already amputated at the knee. Subsequent flashbacks reveal that the boys' mother died when they were young, and, with their father missing, the two set off on their own; Jerry Lee's leg is injured when they attempt to stow away on a train.

When Polly alerts Frank that Jerry Lee is in the Reno hospital, Frank rushes to be with his brother. Although Frank attempts to reassure Jerry Lee that the boy was an unloved drifter like them, Jerry Lee remains dubious and guilt-ridden. When the police begin to piece together clues, the brothers once again decide to flee town, though Jerry Lee's wounded leg has become infected. Frank meets with his friends, who suggest he invest his meager savings in the Tyson vs Douglas boxing match. Flush with cash after Buster Douglas' upset victory, Frank donates some of his winnings to the dead boy's family, and purchases a car from childhood father figure Earl Hurley, who advises him not to think of himself as a loser.

Frank sneaks his brother out of the hospital, just as the police arrive. Jerry Lee is excited to find that Frank has rescued an abused dog, and the three of them head to a small town. Although Frank professes there to be no reason to head there, he later reveals that his former girlfriend, Annie James, lives there. She has sent him postcards asking for forgiveness for an unspecified action. When Jerry Lee presses Frank to discuss his thoughts and feelings, Frank explains that he caught Annie's forced prostitution by her abusive mother. Encouraged by Jerry Lee, Annie and Frank slowly rekindle their relationship. Meanwhile, Jerry Lee sinks further into depression, claiming that no woman will love a man with one leg, especially after he has killed a child.

Frank's alcoholism and apparent ulcers begin to worry Jerry Lee. At the same time, Jerry Lee's infected leg begins to grow worse. Unable to take care of himself, Jerry Lee is forced to request aid from Frank when he takes a shower and urinates. The brothers bond further over their hardships, but Frank remains cautiously noncommittal about his relationship with Annie. As Jerry Lee becomes more ill, he states that Frank's stories often feature tragic endings, especially for the women. When Jerry Lee is once again hospitalized, Frank recounts a new story with a happy ending, but before he can finish it, Jerry Lee dies from the infection. In the film's final scene, Frank meets Annie at her workplace, and he commits to her.

== Cast ==
- Emile Hirsch as Frank Flannigan
  - Andrew Lee as 14-year-old Frank
- Stephen Dorff as Jerry Lee Flannigan
  - Garrett Backstrom as 16-year-old Jerry Lee
- Dakota Fanning as Annie James
- Kris Kristofferson as Earl Hurley
- Joshua Leonard as Tommy
- Dayton Callie as Uncle Gary
- Noah Harpster as Al Casey
- Jenica Bergere as Polly Flynn

== Production ==
The Polskys first cast Emile Hirsch but were unsure Stephen Dorff fit the role of Jerry Lee. Dorff convinced them when he agreed to test with Emile, whom he had met years before at a party with the premonition: "I think we're going to play brothers one day."

Portland, Oregon-based artist Mike Smith performed the film's animated sequences, which director Werner Herzog praised.

== Release ==
The Motel Life premiered at the Rome Film Festival in 2012 where it won the Audience Award, Best Screenplay, Best Editing, and the Critics Award. It went on to play at the Mill Valley Film Festival, the Chicago International Film Festival, the Philadelphia Film Festival, and the Woodstock Film Festival. The film opened in select theaters, on iTunes, and Video on Demand on November 8, 2013.

== Reception ==
Rotten Tomatoes, a review aggregator, reports that 70% of 43 surveyed critics gave the film a positive review; the average rating is 6.19/10. The general consensus states: "The Motel Life transcends its frustratingly uneven screenplay with some outstanding work from a talented cast." Metacritic rated it 61/100 based on 19 reviews. Peter Travers of Rolling Stone wrote, "Striking. Tinged with humor and heartbreak. Emile Hirsch and Stephen Dorff are outstanding, engaged and enthralling." Sheila O'Malley of RogerEbert.com wrote, "A beautifully warm film with a very kind heart. Every frame feels right, every choice feels thought-out, considered. All adds up to a heartbreaking whole. Stephen Dorff's performance is a damn near masterpiece of pathos." Andy Webster of The New York Times wrote, "The story may be slight, but the performances and ambience resonate." Jessica Kiang of Indiewire wrote, "But while it doesn't reinvent the wheel, or revolutionize the genre, it achieves its modest ambitions affectingly well, in no small part due to a clutch of cherishable performances, especially from leads Emile Hirsch and Stephen Dorff". Roman Vasyanov's cinematography was praised by The New York Daily News and The Wall Street Journal, who called him "a shooter to keep our eyes on".

Drew Hunt of Slant Magazine wrote that "the film flatlines at a messy pace because of the frequent shifts in time and space". Boyd van Hoeij of Variety described it as "a film so full of explanatory flashbacks and animated sequences visualizing its characters' invented yarns that their real dramas are almost obscured." Peter Bradshaw of The Guardian wrote, "Alan and Gabe Polsky's film about two hobo brothers on the run labours with heroes who are neither sympathetic or interesting". Mick LaSalle of the San Francisco Chronicle wrote that of the protagonists that "you'd have to be a very, very nice person to care about how it all works out for them."

=== Awards ===
In 2012, The Motel Life received three awards out of four nominations at the Rome Film Festival. Hughes Winborne and Fabienne Rawley won Associazione Italiana Montaggio Cinematografico e Televisivo (AMC) Award, Gabe and Alan Polsky won the Audience Award and Noah Harpster and Micah Fitzerman-Blue won Best Screenplay. Gabe and Allan Polsky were also nominated for the Golden Marc'Aurelio Award.

Werner Herzog hosted a special screening of the film at The Academy of Motion Pictures Arts and Sciences and expressed his admiration for the Polskys' directorial debut, stating, "It's really an accomplishment of two young filmmakers...You see a portion of America you have never seen in movies." Kristofferson said that The Motel Life is the finest film he has ever been in.

== Soundtrack ==
1. "Fit to Be Tied" by Jonathan Clay
2. "Roll 'Em Dice" by Lee Silver
3. "Oil Can" by Joe D'Augustine
4. "Drifting Apart" by Marty Stuart
5. "They Killed John Henry" by Justin Townes Earle
6. "250 Miles" by Parker Griggs (Radio Moscow)
7. "Wait" by Jamie Hince & Alison Mosshart (The Kills)
8. "In Cold Blood" by Jack Shaindlin
9. "Mr. Mudd & Mr. Gold" by Townes Van Zandt
10. "Give 'Em Hell" by Anthony Catalano, Celeste Spina (Little Hurricane)
11. "Prairie Saga" by Raymond Beaver
12. "Reverse Harmonics" by Joe D'Augustine
13. "Dark Horse" by Brandy St. John
14. "Girl from the North Country" by Bob Dylan
15. "The Boyfriends" by Willy Vlautin, Sean Oldham, Dave Harding (Richmond Fontaine)
