= Red Penguins =

2019 sports documentary film by Gabe Polsky

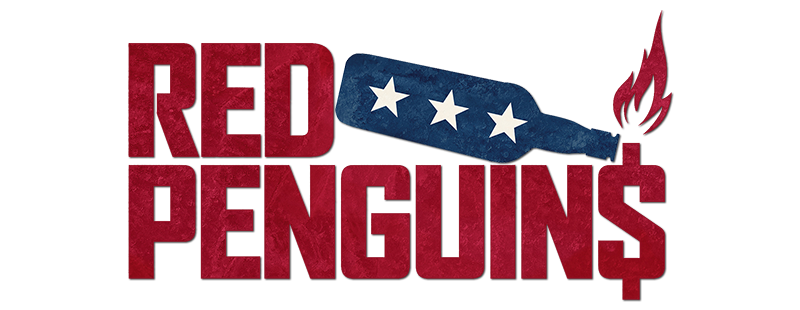
- Directed by: Gabe Polsky
- Written by: Gabe Polsky
- Produced by: Gabe Polsky
- Cinematography: Alexey Elagin
- Edited by: Christina Stiles
- Music by: Leo Birenberg
- Production companies: Gabriel Polsky Productions; Norddeutscher Rundfunk; Studio Hamburg Enterprises
- Distributed by: Universal Pictures (United States); Norddeutscher Rundfunk (Germany)
- Release dates: September 5, 2019 (TIFF); August 4, 2020 (United States); March 6, 2021 (Germany)
- Running time: 80 minutes
- Countries: United States; Germany
- Languages: English; Russian

Red Penguins is a 2019 sports documentary film written, produced and directed by Gabe Polsky, in co-production with Studio Hamburg Enterprises and Norddeutscher Rundfunk. The film premiered on September 5, 2019 at the Toronto International Film Festival. It received Writers Guild of America and Critics Choice awards nominations.

Red Penguins tells the story of opportunism run amok in 1990s Moscow. Shortly after the collapse of the Soviet Union, ice hockey teams Pittsburgh Penguins and the CSKA Moscow (also known in the West as the Red Army team) formed a joint venture. American marketer Steve Warshaw was sent to Moscow and was tasked to transform the team into the greatest show in Russia, attracting some of the biggest names in Hollywood and advertising along the way.

The film uses archival footage and features the 2006 Gogol Bordello song "Start Wearing Purple".

== Background ==
The film highlights the link between sports and politics in United States–Russia relations. The project came about after Steven Warshaw, the main subject of the film, sent Polsky a large box of documents and videotapes about the marketing venture after seeing Polsky's previous film, Red Army.

== Cast ==
The film features interviews with people involved with the Russian Penguins team, and early 1990s Russian culture. Production occurred in both the U.S. and Russia.

- Steven Warshaw – was the Pittsburgh Penguins marketing man in charge on the ground in Moscow.
- Howard Baldwin – is the former owner and president of the Pittsburgh Penguins. Baldwin got into the business of ice hockey in the 1970s, when he founded the Hartford Whalers at 28. He is also an Oscar-nominated film producer of films including Ray, Sudden Death, and Mystery, Alaska.
- Tom Ruta – was the CFO and co-owner of the Pittsburgh Penguins during the Russian Penguins venture.
- Valery Gushin – is the former General Manager of the Russian Penguins ice hockey team. He had a reputation as a heavy drinking man.
- Viktor Tikhonov – was a famed Soviet ice hockey player and coach, best known as the head coach of the Soviet national team in the 1980s. He was the head coach of CSKA Moscow during the Red Penguins venture.
- Viktor Gusev – was the Vice President of Media and Public Relations for the Russian Penguins. He is now one of the lead anchor men for Channel 1 in Moscow.
- Alimzhan Tokhtakhunov – is a Russian businessman who has been suspected of involvement in organized crime and is sought by United States law enforcement.
- Alexander Lyubimov – one of the most prominent TV personalities in Russia. His show Vzglyad broke from the traditional Soviet news format and offered a more progressive view on Post-Soviet Russia.
- Vladislav Listyev – was a well-known Russian journalist and head of the ORT TV Channel (now Channel One).

== Release ==
Red Penguins made its international debut at the 2019 Toronto International Film Festival. It was also screened at the Philadelphia International Film Festival, DOC NYC, Palm Springs Film Festival, and the Santa Barbara International Film Festival. It was released in the United States via video on demand on August 4, 2020, by Universal Pictures.

== Reception ==
Pete Hammond of Deadline called the film "A remarkable – and funny – documentary that seems ripe for a quick pickup and entry into this year's documentary feature race". Dennis Harvey of Variety called it"A very entertaining feature ... Its assembly is always lively, aimed at engaging viewers with or without any interest in hockey. It's a fun movie." Red Penguins was mentioned as an awards contender by Variety, The Hollywood Reporter and The Wrap. In October 2020 the film was nominated for a Critics Choice Award. In February 2021 the film was nominated for a WGA Award for "Best Documentary Screenplay".

== See also ==
- List of films about ice hockey
