= Maniac (Norwegian TV series) =

2015 comedy-drama series

- Genre: Comedy drama
- Created by: Espen PA Lervaag; Håkon Bast Mossige; Ingeborg Raustøl
- Directed by: Kjetil Indregard
- Starring: Espen PA Lervaag; Håkon Bast Mossige; Ingeborg Raustøl
- Country of origin: Norway
- Original language: Norwegian
- No. of seasons: 1
- No. of episodes: 10

Production
- Executive producers: Anne Kolbjørnsen; Pal Kruke Kristiansen
- Producers: Terje Strømstad; Ole Marius Araldsen
- Cinematography: Matthew Weston
- Editor: Christopher Gibb
- Running time: 23 minutes
- Production company: Rubicon TV

Original release
- Release: December 1, 2015

Related
- Maniac (miniseries)

Maniac is a Norwegian comedy-drama series that was released by TV 2 in 2015. It stars Espen PA Lervaag. Håkon Bast Mossige and Ingeborg Raustøl have supporting roles. Kjetil Indregard directs. The series is produced for Rubicon TV by producer Terje Strømstad, creative producer Ole Marius Araldsen and executive producers Anne Kolbjørnsen and Pal Kruke Kristiansen.

== Development ==
Maniac was developed as an experiment by TV 2 Zebra in the spring of 2013, where viewers helped select the best concepts for new television series. The entire series was released on streaming service TV 2 Sumo on December 1, 2015. This was the first time TV 2 released its own production for streaming before it was broadcast. It was broadcast on TV 2 in 2016.

== Premise ==
Espen is a man in his thirties who is beloved by all. He experiences each day as a party with limitless opportunities. All this, however, happens only in his imagination. In reality, Espen is a patient in a psychiatric hospital where he has not yet expressed a single word.

== US remake ==
In 2018, Netflix released a miniseries of the same name starring Jonah Hill and Emma Stone that is loosely based on the Norwegian production.
