= Willy Vlautin =

American author, musician and songwriter (born 1967)

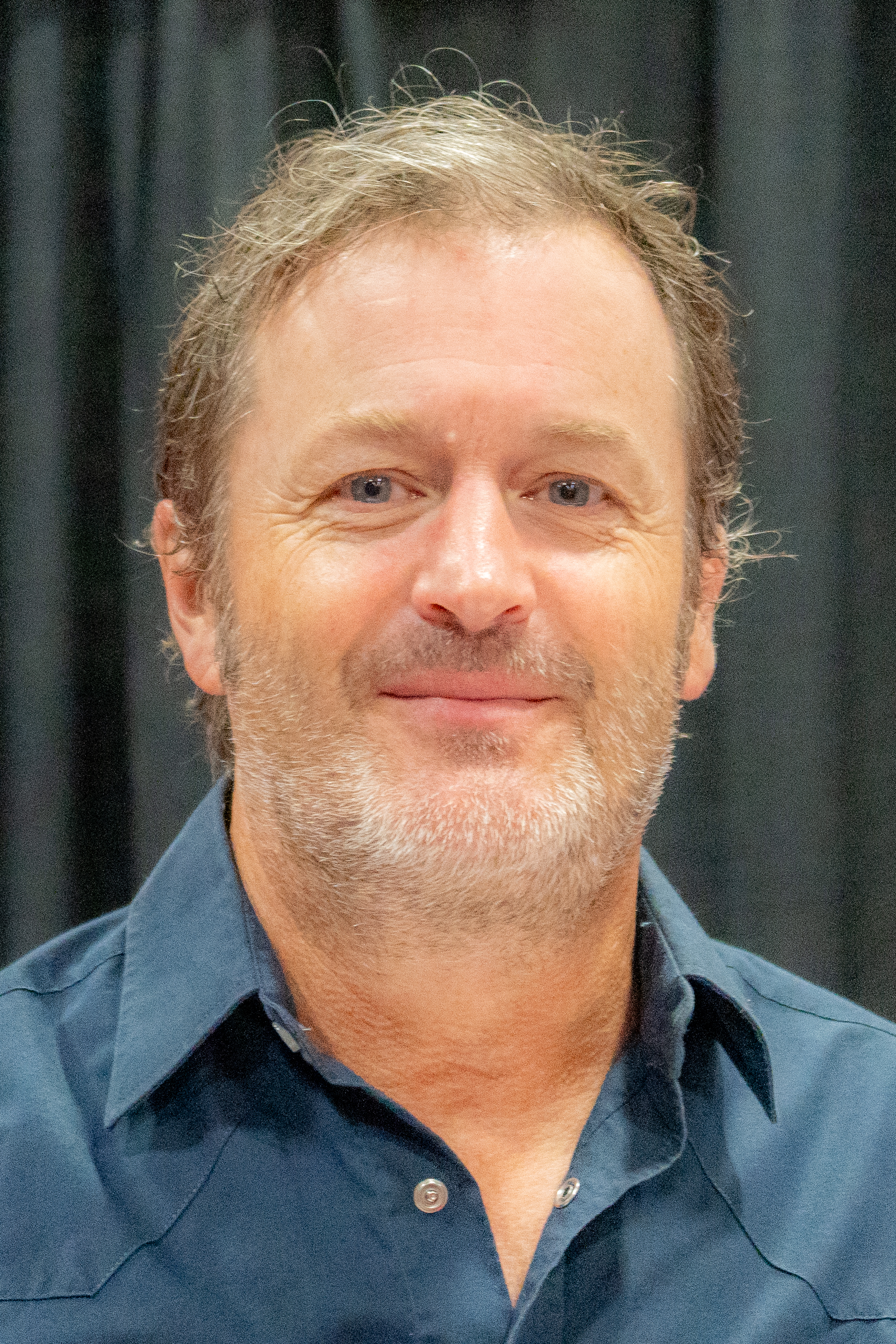
- Vlautin at the National Book Festival 2025
- Born: Willy C. Vlautin; 1967 (age 58–59); Reno, Nevada, U.S.
- Occupations: Writer, musician
- Writing career
- Genre: social novel
- Notable works: The Motel Life, Don't Skip Out On Me,The night always comes
- Website: www.willyvlautin.com

Willy C. Vlautin (born 1967) is an American author, musician and songwriter. He was the lead singer, guitarist and songwriter of Portland, Oregon rock band Richmond Fontaine (1994–2016) and is currently a member of The Delines. Born and raised in Reno, Nevada, he has released 14 studio albums since the mid-nineties with Richmond Fontaine. He is the author of several novels, including The Motel Life, Northline, Lean on Pete, The Free, Don't Skip Out On Me, The Night Always Comes, and The Horse.

== Career ==
=== Music ===
Vlautin first found success as the lead singer, guitarist, and songwriter in alt-country group Richmond Fontaine. They recorded eleven studio albums and toured extensively in Europe, where they have a particularly strong following, as well as in Australia and the US, before splitting in 2016. Vlautin is currently a member of The Delines. In December 2008 he had released the spoken word EP A Jockey's Christmas, followed by his debut solo album, The Kill Switch, in October 2019.

Numerous references to Richmond Fontaine songs later appeared in Vlautin's prose work. His novel Northline is named after a song from their Winnemucca album, and the protagonist is named for "Allison Johnson", the title of a song on Post to Wire. Both his lyrics and fiction feature Reno's Fitzgerald Hotel as a recurring location.

=== Writing ===
Vlautin's first book, The Motel Life was published in 2007 and received critical acclaim. It was an editor's choice in the New York Times Book Review and named one of the top 25 books of the year by the Washington Post. Polsky Films released a film adaptation, starring Emile Hirsch, Stephen Dorff, Dakota Fanning and Kris Kristofferson, in November 2013. The film was praised by critics across the US and won three prizes at the Rome International Film Festival: Audience Choice, Best Screenplay, and Editing.

His second novel, Northline, was also critically hailed. George Pelecanos chose it as his favorite book of the decade. The first edition of this novel came with an original instrumental soundtrack, performed by Vlautin and Richmond Fontaine bandmate Paul Brainard. Like his songwriting, Vlautin's fiction is highly evocative of the American West; all three of his novels being set in and around Oregon, Nevada and New Mexico. His books explore the circumstances and relationships of people near the bottom of America's social and economic spectrum, itinerant and often alcoholic.

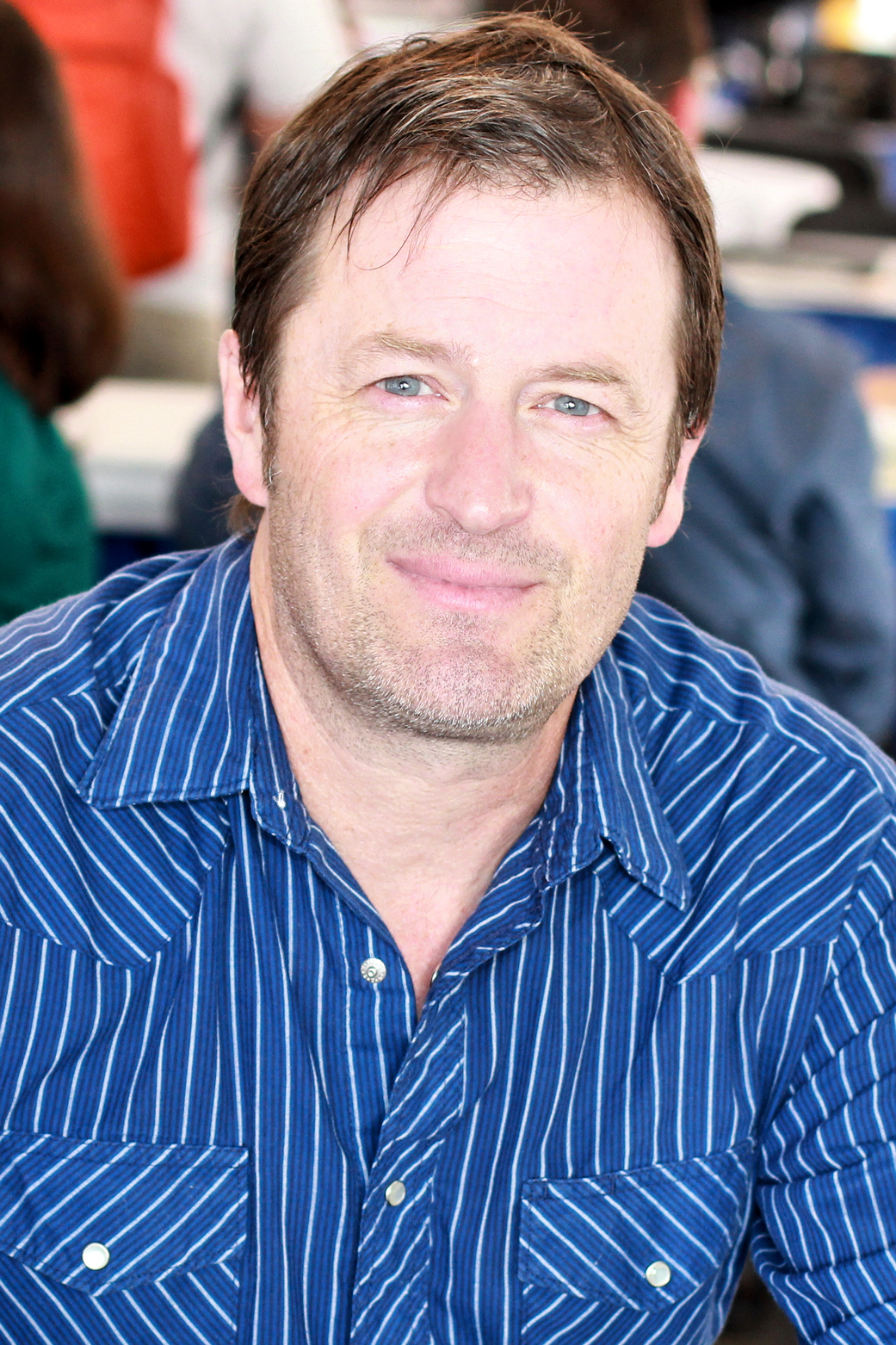
Vlautin at the 2018 Texas Book Festival

Vlautin's third novel, Lean on Pete, is the story of a 15-year-old boy who works and lives on a rundown race track in Portland, Oregon, and befriends a failed race horse. The Sunday Herald stated, "Lean on Pete confirms his status as one of the most emotionally charged writers in America..." Eileen Battersby of the Irish Times stated "As one boy’s journey, Lean on Pete is as real as blood: as a novel it is remarkable. Willy Vlautin, romantic and realist, has written something special that will make you shudder, weep, rage and wonder at how such things happen and do, and how some individuals such as Charley can suffer them, absorb the grief, and somehow survive. How good is contemporary US fiction? This good: catch your breath good.” Cheryl Strayed of The Oregonian states "By the time ‘Lean on Pete’ reaches its sweet but unsentimental end, Charley Thompson isn't a character in a novel, but a boy readers have come to love. ‘Lean on Pete’ riveted me. Reading it, I was heartbroken and moved; enthralled and convinced. This is serious American literature." Lean on Pete won two Oregon Book Awards: the Ken Kesey Award for Fiction and the Peoples Choice Award. A movie based on the book was released in 2017.

=== Influences ===
Vlautin has cited writers such as John Steinbeck, Raymond Carver, Barry Gifford, Sam Shepard, and William Kennedy as influences. As a songwriter, he has been inspired by the work of Tom Waits, Shane MacGowan, John Doe, and Australian musician Paul Kelly.

== Accolades ==
He received the Silver Pen Award from the University of Nevada, Reno Friends of the University Library in 2007 and was inducted into the Nevada Writers Hall of Fame in 2016.

Don't Skip Out on Me was a finalist for the 2019 PEN/Faulkner Award.

Vlautin won the 2025 Joyce Carol Oates Prize issued by the New Literary Project.

== Selected bibliography ==
- The Motel Life (2006)
- Northline (2008)
- Lean on Pete (2010)
- The Free (2014)
- Don't Skip Out On Me (2018)
- The Night Always Comes (2021)
- The Horse (2024)
- The Left and the Lucky (2026)
