= Red Army (film) =

2014 film directed by Gabe Polsky

- Theatrical release poster
- Directed by: Gabe Polsky
- Written by: Gabe Polsky
- Produced by: Gabe Polsky; Jerry Weintraub; Werner Herzog; Liam Satre Meloy
- Cinematography: Peter Zeitlinger; Svetlana Svetko
- Edited by: Eli B. Despres; Kurt Engfehr
- Music by: Christophe Beck; Leo Birenberg
- Production company: Gabriel Polsky Productions
- Distributed by: Sony Pictures Classics
- Release dates: May 16, 2014 (Cannes); September 9, 2014 (TIFF); January 23, 2015 (United States)
- Running time: 84 minutes
- Countries: United States; Russia
- Languages: English; Russian
- Box office: $694,600

Red Army is a 2014 American-Russian documentary film directed, produced, and written by Gabe Polsky, executive produced by Jerry Weintraub and Werner Herzog. It premiered at the 2014 Cannes Film Festival and was released in limited theaters by Sony Pictures Classics on January 23, 2015. The film tells the story of the Soviet Union national ice hockey team through the eyes of team captain Slava Fetisov, in particular the famed 1990s five-man unit known as The Russian Five.

The film details the link between sports and politics. The film also narrates how players were wooed by National Hockey League scouts and eventually flooded NHL rosters. The film is particularly harsh on the ruthless tactics of coach Viktor Tikhonov about whom none of the players have a kind word. Tikhonov died in November 2014.

The movie uses rare archival footage, including children singing "No Coward Plays Hockey."

== Background ==
The film relates the Soviet Union's dominance of ice hockey during the Cold War.

== Release ==
Red Army made its North American debut at the 2014 Toronto International Film Festival, following which Sony Pictures Classics acquired rights to the film in North America, Eastern Europe and Asia. The film is about the Soviet-Russian game from the 1950s to the dominance of the 1970s and 1980s and then gradual deterioration in the 1990s. The film was screened in the Special Screenings section of the 2014 Cannes Film Festival.

The film was included in the official selections at the 2014 Telluride, Toronto and New York film festivals. Red Army won Audience Awards at the 2014 AFI, Chicago and Middleburg film festivals. The film was also selected as the Opening Ceremony film of the 2014 Moscow International Film Festival.

== Reception ==
Red Army is one of the best reviewed films of 2014, maintaining a 97% rating on Rotten Tomatoes with an average rating of 7.9/10 based on 92 reviews. The site's consensus reads: "Fun and fascinating, Red Army delivers absorbing documentary drama for hockey fans and sports novices alike." On Metacritic, the film has an 83 out of 100 rating based on 33 critics, indicating "universal acclaim".

A. O. Scott of The New York Times called the film a "stirring, crazy story—a Russian novel of Tolstoyan sweep and Gogl-esque absurdity". Time magazine said: "this playful, poignant film presents a human story that transcends decades, borders and ideologies". Scott Feinberg of The Hollywood Reporter called the film "one of the best documentaries that I have ever seen".

The film was nominated for Best Documentary Screenplay from the Writers Guild of America.

== See also ==
- List of films about ice hockey
