= The Fall of Fujimori =

- Directed by: Ellen Perry
- Written by: Ellen Perry; Kim Roberts; Zack Anderson
- Produced by: Ellen Perry
- Cinematography: Junji Aoki; Mel Henry; Ellen Perry
- Edited by: Kim Roberts
- Release date: 2005
- Running time: 83 minutes
- Country: United States
- Language: English

The Fall of Fujimori is a 2005 documentary film about Peruvian President Alberto Fujimori, who fled the country for Japan in 2000 to avoid facing 21 charges of corruption, murder and human rights abuses. Five years later, Fujimori flew into Chile and declared his intention of once again running for president in 2006. He was promptly arrested.

The Fall of Fujimori was produced and directed by Ellen Perry and aired on PBS as part of its Point of View series in 2006.

== Reception ==
On the review aggregator website Rotten Tomatoes, 92% of 12 critics' reviews are positive, with an average rating of 7.1/10. The film was nominated for Best Documentary Screenplay from the Writers Guild of America.
