= Espen PA Lervaag =

Norwegian actor (born 1977)

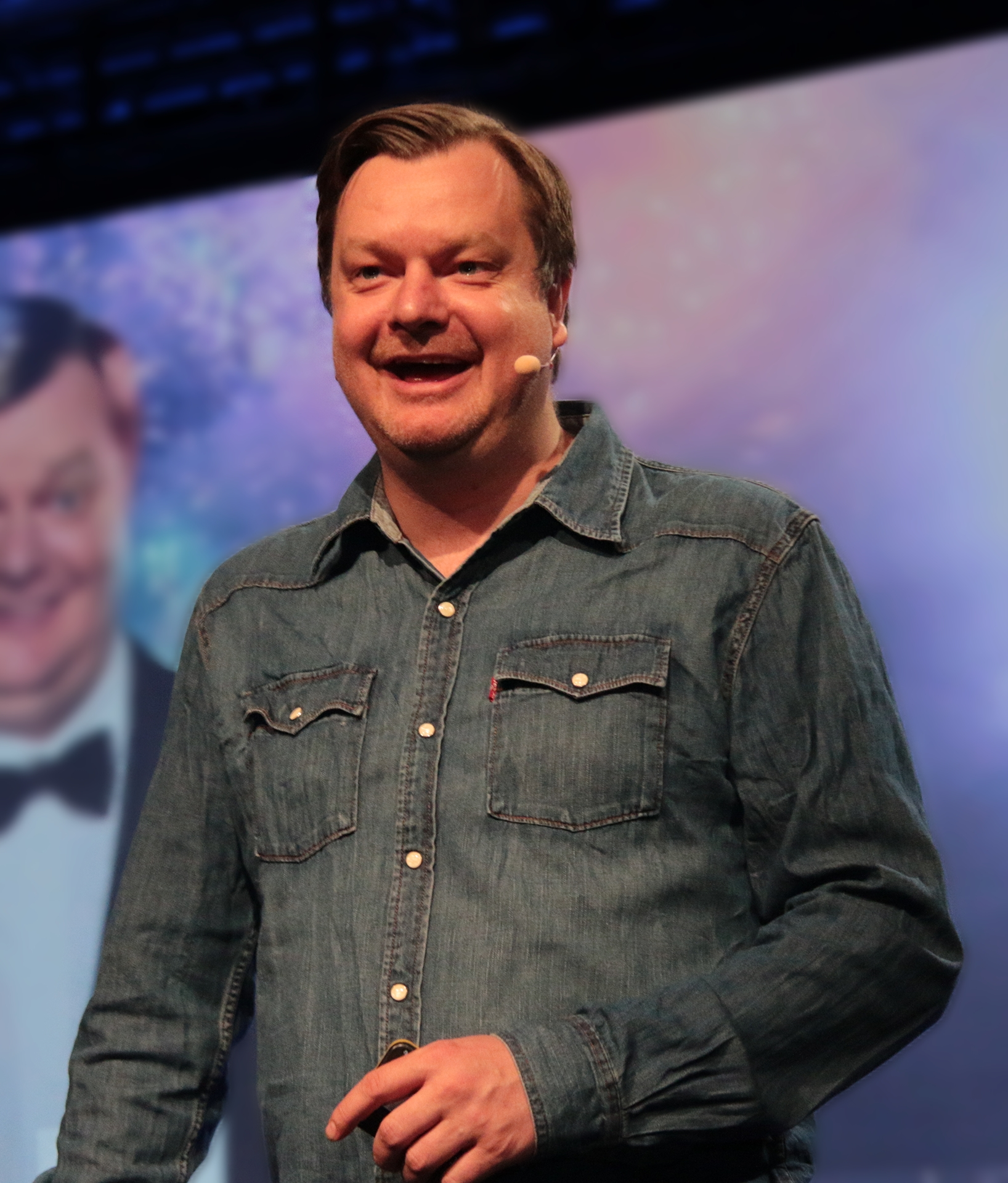
Espen PA Lervaag, 2016

Espen PA Lervaag (Espen Petrus Andersen Lervaag), born 10 July 1977, is a Norwegian writer, comedian and actor.

He is the creator and lead actor in the Norwegian TV-series Maniac.

He was nominated for a Golden Nymph Award in the category "Outstanding Actor in a Comedy TV Series" at the 2016 Monte-Carlo Television Festival.

The TV series Maniac was nominated in the category "Best Comedy TV Series" at the Monte-Carlo Television Festival.
