= The Motel Life =

2007 novel by Willy Vlautin

- Paperback cover
- Author: Willy Vlautin
- Illustrator: Nate Beaty
- Language: English
- Publisher: Faber and Faber
- Publication date: April 5, 2007
- Publication place: United States
- Media type: Print (Paperback)
- Pages: 224 pp
- ISBN: 978-0-571-22808-9
- OCLC: 76798237
- Followed by: 'Northline'

The Motel Life (2006) is the debut novel by musician and writer Willy Vlautin. It tells the story of two brothers from Reno, Nevada, whose lives are thrown into turmoil following a tragic accident. It was made into a movie starring Emile Hirsch, Stephen Dorff, and Dakota Fanning, and released in November 2013.

== Plot ==
Frank and Jerry Lee Flannigan are two down-and-out brothers who live a meager existence in Reno, Nevada. Both men are high school dropouts who live in cheap motel rooms, work at odd jobs for money, and drink heavily. One night, while driving drunk during a blizzard, Jerry Lee accidentally hits and kills a teenage boy on a bicycle. Although the accident is the boy's fault, there are no witnesses, and Jerry Lee is certain that the police will put the blame on him. He convinces Frank to leave town with him and flee to Montana. Along the way, Jerry Lee abandons Frank in Wyoming and then burns the car in a secluded Idaho forest. Both men return separately to Reno.

The police seem to take no interest in the case, so both men attempt to settle back into their Reno lives. Frank adopts an abused, half-frozen dog he finds during a snowstorm. Acting on a tip from a friend, he scrapes together $400 and bets it on the Tyson-Douglas boxing match, winning more than $5,000. He also tracks down the family of the dead teenager and stands outside their home, watching them come and go. Jerry Lee, meanwhile, becomes consumed by guilt and attempts suicide, shooting himself in the leg. He survives and lands in the hospital. On the day of the Tyson-Douglas fight, the police come to question Jerry Lee; they have discovered the burned-out wreck of his car in Idaho. Once again, Jerry Lee convinces Frank to flee Reno.

Frank uses his winnings to buy a used car. He leaves $1,000 at the home of the dead teenager, sneaks Jerry Lee out of the hospital, and heads to the town of Elko, Nevada, to hide from the police. Frank's ex-girlfriend Annie lives in Elko, and he secretly hopes to run into her. But Jerry Lee's wounds are far from healed and he quickly becomes very sick.

== Characters ==
- Frank Flannigan – Protagonist and the novel's narrator. A gifted storyteller, he was once a promising baseball talent but dropped out of high school soon after the death of his mother. He drinks heavily and has ulcers.
- Jerry Lee Flannigan – Protagonist. Frank's older brother and a talented artist. As a teenager, he lost the lower half of one leg in a train accident. He is depressed and feels that he is a failure, feelings which are greatly magnified after he hits and kills the teenager.
- Mrs. Flannigan – Frank and Jerry Lee's mother. She dies from an unspecified disease when the boys are 16 and 14, respectively.
- Jimmy Flannigan – Frank and Jerry Lee's father. He has a gambling addiction and eventually walks out on the family after rendering them penniless.
- Earl Hurley – A used-car dealer and Frank's ex-employer. He tries to mentor Frank, although it is often in vain.
- Tommy Locowane – Frank and Jerry Lee's long-time friend. He saves Jerry Lee's life after the train accident. He has a terrible gambling addiction and, in desperation, gets Frank to wager heavily on the Tyson-Douglas fight in an attempt to erase a $2,000 gambling debt.
- Annie James – Frank's old girlfriend. Annie's mother forces her into prostitution; when Frank catches Annie in the act, he breaks up with her. He later travels to Elko in the hopes of meeting her again.
- Wes Johnson Denny – A teenager who rides his bicycle into the path of Jerry Lee's car during a blinding snowstorm. He is killed in the ensuing collision.
- Old Man Jenkins (The dog) – Tango Hecklin

== Reception ==
"The Motel Life" received a favorable review from New York Times critic John Wray, who wrote: "Slighter than Carver, less puerile than Bukowski, Vlautin nevertheless manages to lay claim to the same bleary-eyed territory, and surprisingly – perhaps even unintentionally – to make it new.". Johnathan Gibbs of The Independent noted: "The brothers' relationship is at the centre of the book. Vlautin is clearly reaching back past Bukowski and the others to the granddaddy of all tragic road stories, that of Lenny and George in Of Mice and Men.".

== Adaptation ==
The novel was adapted into a film by Alan Polsky and Gabriel Polsky. It debuted in the United States on 8 November 2013 in select theatres.
