= List of awards and nominations received by Passions =

List of accolades received by Passions
Awards and nominations
Award	Wins	Nominations
ALMA Award	0	4
Artios Awards	0	6
Daytime Emmy Awards	5	38
GLAAD Media Award	1	2
Imagen Awards	3	3
NAACP Image Awards	1	12
Soap Opera Digest Awards	4	9
Writers Guild of America Awards	0	1
Young Artist Award	1	5
YoungStar Award	1	2

Totals (Note: Certain award groups do not simply award one winner. They acknowledge several different recipients, have runners-up, and have third place. Since this is a specific recognition and is different from losing an award, runner-up mentions are considered wins in this award tally. For simplification and to avoid errors, each award in this list has been presumed to have had a prior nomination.)
- Wins: 16
- Nominations: 71

The American soap opera Passions has been honored with numerous awards and nominations during its run:

== Awards and nominations ==
Accolades received by Passions
Award	Date of Ceremony	Category	Recipient(s)	Result	Ref.
ALMA Award	2001	Outstanding Daytime Drama	Passions	Nominated	
ALMA Award	2002	Outstanding Actress in a Daytime Drama	Eva Tamargo as Pilar Lopez-Fitzgerald	Nominated	
ALMA Award	2008	Outstanding Performance in a Daytime Drama Series	Galen Gering as Luis Lopez-Fitzgerald	Nominated	
ALMA Award	2008	Outstanding Performance in a Daytime Drama Series	Eva Tamargo as Pilar Lopez-Fitzgerald	Nominated	
Artios Awards	2000	Best Daytime Episodic Casting	Jacklynn Briskey	Nominated	
Artios Awards	2003	Best Daytime Episodic Casting	Jacklynn Briskey	Nominated	
Artios Awards	2004	Best Daytime Episodic Casting	Jacklynn Briskey	Nominated	
Artios Awards	2005	Best Daytime Episodic Casting	Jacklynn Briskey	Nominated	
Artios Awards	2006	Best Daytime Episodic Casting	Jacklynn Briskey	Nominated	
Artios Awards	2007	Best Daytime Episodic Casting	Jacklynn Briskey	Nominated	
Daytime Emmy Awards	2001	Outstanding Drama Series Directing Team	Peter Brinckerhoff, Grant Johnson, Jim Sayegh, Gary Tomlin, Karen Wilkens, Tina Keller, Robbin Phillips, Ann Rogerson, Paul Antonelli, Steven Vincent, Mary Ann Benson, Bret Warren, and Roy Friedland	Nominated	
Daytime Emmy Awards	2001	Achievement in Music Direction And Composition For A Drama Series	Paul F. Antonelli, Ed O’Donnell, John Henry Kreitler, and Wesley B. Boatman, Jr.	Nominated	
Daytime Emmy Awards	2001	Outstanding Original Song	Wesley B. Boatman, Jr., Steven J. Snyder, and John Henry Kreitler for "Brown-Eyed Beauty"	Nominated	
Daytime Emmy Awards	2001	Outstanding Original Song	Patsy Meyer, John Henry Kreitler, and R. Jay Flippin for "I Could Live Without You"	Nominated	
Daytime Emmy Awards	2001	Outstanding Original Song	John Henry Kreitler, Grant Geissman, and Ali B. Olmo for "No Puedo Olvidar"	Nominated	
Daytime Emmy Awards	2001	Outstanding Younger Actor in a Drama Series	Josh Ryan Evans as Timmy Lenox	Nominated	
Daytime Emmy Awards	2001	Achievement in Live & Direct to Tape Sound Mixing for a Drama Series	Bruce Bottone, Ricky Alvarez, Carol Benedetti, Anthony Dalferes, Scott Heflin, Carol Silverman, Walter New, and Dan Bosworth	Nominated	
Daytime Emmy Awards	2001	Outstanding Drama Series Writing Team	James E. Reilly, Peggy Schibi, Roger Newman, Pete Rich, Maralyn Thoma, Nancy Williams Watt, Ethel Brez, Mel Brez, Shawn Morrison, Marlene Clark Poulter, Darrell Ray Thomas, Jr., Kathleen R. Robinson, and Chris J. Robinson	Nominated	
Daytime Emmy Awards	2002	Outstanding Achievement for a Casting Director for a Drama Series	Jacklynn Briskey	Nominated	
Daytime Emmy Awards	2002	Outstanding Drama Series Writing Team	James E. Reilly, Peggy Schibi, Roger Newman, Pete Rich, Maralyn Thoma, Nancy Williams Watt, Ethel Brez, Mel Brez, Shawn Morrison, Marlene Clark Poulter, Darrell Ray Thomas, Jr., Kathleen R. Robinson, and Chris J. Robinson	Nominated	
Daytime Emmy Awards	2003	Outstanding Achievement for a Casting Director for a Drama Series	Jacklynn Briskey	Nominated	
Daytime Emmy Awards	2003	Outstanding Drama Series Directing Team	Peter Brinckerhoff, Grant Johnson, Jim Sayegh, Karen Wilkens, Phideaux Xavier, Tina Keller, Robbin Phillips, Paul Antonelli, Mary Ann Benson, Steven Vincent, Roy Friedland, Michael Caron, and Michelle Azenzer	Nominated	
Daytime Emmy Awards	2003	Outstanding Achievement in Music Direction and Composition for a Drama Series	John Henry Kreitler, Wesley B. Boatman, Jr., Ed O'Donnell, and Paul F. Antonelli	Nominated	
Daytime Emmy Awards	2003	Outstanding Drama Series Writing Team	James E. Reilly, Peggy Schibi, Roger Newman, Pete T. Rich, Maralyn Thoma, Nancy Williams Watt, N. Gail Lawrence, Shawn Morrison, Marlene Clark Poulter, Darrell Ray Thomas, Jr., Kathleen R. Robinson, and Chris J. Robinson	Nominated	
Daytime Emmy Awards	2003	Outstanding Original Song	John Henry Kreitler and Faith Rivera for "Forever Near"	Won	
Daytime Emmy Awards	2004	Outstanding Drama Series Directing Team	Peter Brinckerhoff, Grant Johnson, Jim Sayegh, Karen Wilkens, Phideaux Xavier, Tina Keller, Dania L. Guthrie, Paul Antonelli, Mary Ann Benson, Steven Vincent, Roy Friedland, Michael Caron, and Jay Zabriskie	Nominated	
Daytime Emmy Awards	2004	Outstanding Achievement in Lighting Direction for a Drama Series	John R. Nance, Mark Torromeo, and Craig Chaddick	Nominated	
Daytime Emmy Awards	2004	Outstanding Original Song	John Henry, Lauren Evans, Cecil Thomas, Jr., and Michael Sechrest for "Last Piece of My Heart"	Nominated	
Daytime Emmy Awards	2004	Outstanding Original Song	John Henry Kreitler, Lauren Evans, and Grant Geissman for "Momma, Gotta Let Her Go"	Nominated	
Daytime Emmy Awards	2004	Outstanding Original Song	John Henry Kreitler and Monte Seward for "Something About Him"	Nominated	
Daytime Emmy Awards	2004	Outstanding Achievement in Music Direction and Composition for a Drama Series	Ed O'Donnell, Paul F. Antonelli, John Henry Kreitler, and Wesley B. Boatman, Jr.	Won	
Daytime Emmy Awards	2004	Outstanding Original Song	John Henry Kreitler and Pete T. Rich for "I Ain't Sorry"	Won	
Daytime Emmy Awards	2005	Outstanding Lead Actress in a Drama Series	Juliet Mills as Tabitha Lenox	Nominated	
Daytime Emmy Awards	2005	Outstanding Achievement in Multiple Camera Editing For A Drama Series	Mary Ann Benson, Paul Hartel, and Steven Vincent	Nominated	
Daytime Emmy Awards	2005	Most Irresistible Combination	Sam Bennett and Ivy Winthrop	Nominated	
Daytime Emmy Awards	2005	Most Irresistible Combination	Luis Lopez-Fitzgerald and Sheridan Crane	Nominated	
Daytime Emmy Awards	2006	Outstanding Achievement in Makeup for a Drama Series	Toby Lamm, Natasja Hewitson, Amy Sparks, and Victoria Doering	Nominated	
Daytime Emmy Awards	2006	Outstanding Achievement in Live & Direct to Tape Sound Mixing for a Drama Series	Bruce Bottone, Anthony Dalferes, Walter New, Daniel Bosworth, Ricardo Alvarez, Greg Ferrara, Carol Silverman, and Al Taddeo	Won	
Daytime Emmy Awards	2007	Outstanding Younger Actor in a Drama Series	James Stevenson as Jared Casey	Nominated	
Daytime Emmy Awards	2007	Outstanding Achievement in Costume Design for a Drama Series	Diana Eden	Nominated	
Daytime Emmy Awards	2007	Outstanding Achievement in Hairstyling for a Drama Series	Bobby Grayson, Shelly Scanlon, Christopher O. Smith, and Jeanie Duronslet	Nominated	
Daytime Emmy Awards	2007	Outstanding Achievement in Makeup for a Drama Series	Toby Lamm, Natasja Hewitson, Amy Sparks, and Victoria Doering	Nominated	
Daytime Emmy Awards	2007	Outstanding Original Song	John Henry Kreitler and Wesley B. Boatman, Jr. for "Love is Ectasy"	Won	
Daytime Emmy Awards	2008 (Note: For the 35th Daytime Emmy Awards, the National Academy of Television Arts and Sciences did not credit individuals for the Creative Arts Emmy Awards, instead using only the show titles for the nominations.)	Outstanding Achievement for in Costume Design for a Drama Series	Passions	Nominated	
Daytime Emmy Awards	2008	Outstanding Achievement in Hairstyling for a Drama Series	Passions	Nominated	
Daytime Emmy Awards	2008	Outstanding Achievement in Makeup for a Drama Series	Passions	Nominated	
Daytime Emmy Awards	2008	Outstanding Achievement in Live & Direct to Tape Sound Mixing for a Drama Series	Passions	Nominated	
Daytime Emmy Awards	2009	Outstanding Achievement in Hairstyling for a Drama Series	Bobby H. Grayson, Diane Martinous, and Kristine Tac	Nominated	
GLAAD Media Award	2006	Outstanding Daily Drama	Passions	Won	
GLAAD Media Award	2007	Outstanding Daily Drama	Passions	Nominated	
Imagen Awards	2001	Daytime Drama	Passions	Won	
Imagen Awards	2002	Daytime Drama	Passions	Won	
Imagen Awards	2004	Daytime Drama	Passions	Won	
NAACP Image Awards	2000	Outstanding Actress in a Daytime Drama Series	Tracey Ross as Eve Russell	Nominated	
NAACP Image Awards	2001	Outstanding Actress in a Daytime Drama Series	Tracey Ross as Eve Russell	Nominated	
NAACP Image Awards	2002	Outstanding Actress in a Daytime Drama Series	Tracey Ross as Eve Russell	Nominated	
NAACP Image Awards	2003	Outstanding Actress in a Daytime Drama Series	Tracey Ross as Eve Russell	Nominated	
NAACP Image Awards	2004	Outstanding Actress in a Daytime Drama Series	Tracey Ross as Eve Russell	Nominated	
NAACP Image Awards	2005	Outstanding Actress in a Daytime Drama Series	Marla Gibbs as Irma Johnson	Nominated	
NAACP Image Awards	2005	Outstanding Actress in a Daytime Drama Series	Tracey Ross as Eve Russell	Nominated	
NAACP Image Awards	2006	Outstanding Actress in a Daytime Drama Series	Marla Gibbs as Irma Johnson	Nominated	
NAACP Image Awards	2006	Outstanding Actress in a Daytime Drama Series	Tracey Ross as Eve Russell	Nominated	
NAACP Image Awards	2007	Outstanding Actress in a Daytime Drama Series	Tracey Ross as Eve Russell	Won	
NAACP Image Awards	2008	Outstanding Actress in a Daytime Drama Series	Brook Kerr as Whitney Russell	Nominated	
NAACP Image Awards	2008	Outstanding Actress in a Daytime Drama Series	Tracey Ross as Eve Russell	Nominated	
Soap Opera Digest Awards	2000	Favorite Show	Passions	Nominated	
Soap Opera Digest Awards	2000	Outstanding Villain	Juliet Mills as Tabitha Lenox	Nominated	
Soap Opera Digest Awards	2000	Outstanding Female Newcomer	Lindsay Korman as Theresa Lopez-Fitzgerald	Nominated	
Soap Opera Digest Awards	2000	Outstanding Male Newcomer	Donn Swaby as Chad Harris-Crane	Nominated	
Soap Opera Digest Awards	2000	Favorite Teen Star	Jesse Metcalfe as Miguel Lopez-Fitzgerald	Nominated	
Soap Opera Digest Awards	2000	Outstanding Scene Stealer	Josh Ryan Evans as Timmy Lenox	Won	
Soap Opera Digest Awards	2001	Outstanding Heroine	McKenzie Westmore as Sheridan Crane	Won	
Soap Opera Digest Awards	2001	Outstanding Male Scene Stealer	Josh Ryan Evans as Timmy Lenox	Won	
Soap Opera Digest Awards	2001	Outstanding Female Scene Stealer	Robin Strasser as Hecuba	Won	
Writers Guild of America Awards	2001	Daytime Serials	James E. Reilly, Ethel Brez, Mel Brez, Shawn Morrison, Marlene Clark Poulter, Darrell Ray Thomas Jr., Peggy Schibi, Roger Newman, Pete T. Rich, Maralyn Thoma, and Nancy Williams Watt	Nominated	
Young Artist Award	2000	Best Performance in a Soap Opera: Young Actor	Josh Ryan Evans as Timmy Lenox	Nominated	
Young Artist Award	2000	Best Performance in a Daytime TV Series – Young Actress	Chea Courtney as Little Angel Girl	Nominated	
Young Artist Award	2000	Best Performance in a Daytime TV Series – Young Actress	Taylor Anne Mountz as Kay Bennett	Won	
Young Artist Award	2001	Best Performance in a Daytime TV Series – Young Actress	Mary Elizabeth Winstead as Jessica Bennett	Nominated	
Young Artist Award	2002	Best Performance in a Daytime TV Series – Young Actress	Chea Courtney as Little Angel Girl	Nominated	
YoungStar Award	2000	Best Young Actress/Performance in a Daytime TV Series	Mary Elizabeth Winstead as Jessica Bennett	Nominated	
YoungStar Award	2000	Best Young Actor/Performance in a Daytime TV Program	Josh Ryan Evans as Timmy Lenox	Won	
