= List of Passions crew =

List of writers, producers and directors who have worked on the American soap opera Passions.

== B ==
Ethel Brez
Associate head writer (1999-2002)

Mel Brez
Associate head writer (1999-2002)

Peter Brinckerhoff
Director (entire run)

== C ==
Lisa de Cazotte
Executive producer (entire run)

== E ==
Clem Egan
Script writer (2004-2008, 2008)

== J ==
Grant A. Johnson
Director (2000-2003)

== G ==
N. Gail Lawrence
Associate head writer (2001-2007)

== M ==
Shawn Morrison
Associate head writer (1999-2003, 2007-2008)
Script writer (2007)

== N ==
Roger Newman
Script writer (1999-2004)

== P ==
Cynthia J. Popp
Director (1999)

Marlene Clark Poulter
Associate head writer (entire run)

== R ==
James E. Reilly
Head writer (entire run)
Consulting producer (entire run)

Pete T. Rich
Script writer (entire run)

Kathleen Robinson

== S ==
Jim Sayegh
Director (entire run)

Peggy Schibi
Script writer (1999-2007)

Richard R. Schilling III
Producer (entire run)

Michael Slade
Script writer (2004-2005)

== T ==
Maralyn Thoma
Script writer (1999-2007)

Darrell Ray Thomas Jr.
Associate head writer (entire run)

Gary Tomlin
Director (2000-2001, 2003-2008)

== W ==
Nancy Williams Watt
Script writer (1999-2007)

Mary-Kelly Weir
Producer (2000-2008)

Karen Wilkens
Director (entire run)

== X ==
Phideaux Xavier
Director (1999, 2001-2008)
