= 46th Writers Guild of America Awards =

46th WGA Awards
- Date: 1994
- Organized by: Writers Guild of America, East and the Writers Guild of America, West

The 46th Writers Guild of America Awards honored the best television, and film writers of 1993. Winners were announced on 13 March 1994. It was the first time that a writer had been nominated four times in the same category.

== Winners and nominees ==
=== Film ===
Winners are listed first highlighted in boldface.

**Best Screenplay Written Directly for the Screen**: **The Piano, Written by Jane Campion**; Dave, Written by Gary Ross; In the Line of Fire, Written by Jeff Maguire; Philadelphia, Written by Ron Nyswaner; Sleepless in Seattle, Written by Jeff Arch, Nora Ephron, and David S. Ward	**Best Screenplay Based on Material Previously Produced or Published**: **Schindler's List, Screenplay by Steven Zaillian; based on the book by Thomas Keneally**; The Fugitive, Screenplay by Jeb Stuart, and David Twohy; story by David Twohy, and the characters by Roy Huggins; In the Name of the Father, Screenplay by Terry George, and Jim Sheridan; based on the autobiographical book "Proved Innocent"; The Joy Luck Club, Screenplay by Ronald Bass, and Amy Tan; based on the novel by Amy Tan; The Remains of the Day, Screenplay by Ruth Prawer Jhabvala; based on the novel by Kazuo Ishiguro

=== Television ===
**Episodic Comedy**: **"The Contest" – Seinfeld (NBC) – Larry David**; "Wait till Your Father Gets Home" – Roseanne (CBS) – Amy Sherman-Paladino; "The Dark Ages" – Roseanne (CBS) – Mike Gandolfi, and Eric Gilliland; "The Outing" – Seinfeld (NBC) – Larry Charles	**Episodic Drama**: **"The Night of the Dead Living" – Homicide: Life on the Street (NBC) – Frank Pugliese, and Tom Fontana**; "Gone for Goode" – Homicide: Life on the Street (NBC) – Paul Attanasio; "Comfort and Joy" – I'll Fly Away (NBC) – Barbara Hall; "Last Wish" – Life Goes On (ABC) – Toni Graphia; "Thanksgiving" – Picket Fences (CBS) – David E. Kelley; "Thank God, It's Friday" – Reasonable Doubts (NBC) – Ed Zuckerman; "The Box" – Tribeca (FOX) – David J. Burke, and Hans Tobeason
**Daytime Serials**: **Loving (Millee Taggart, Robert Guza, Jr., Laurie McCarthy, Addie Walsh, Craig Carlson, John Kuntz, Eugenie Hunt, Dana Herko, Lewis Arlt, Tony Lang, Lynda Myles, Juliette Mann, Andrew Gottlieb, Nancy Maxwell)**; All My Children (Megan McTavish, Agnes Nixon, Richard Culliton, Hal Corley, Carolyn Culliton, Karen Lewis, Janet Iacobuzio, Elizabeth Smith, Michelle Patrick, Jeff Beldner, Bettina F. Bradbury, Ralph Wakefield, Judith Donato, Susan Kirshenbaum, Kathleen Klein); Another World (Peggy Sloane, Victor Miller, Craig Carlson, Samuel D. Ratcliffe, Lisa Kern, Janet Stampfl, Kathleen Kennedy, Judith Pinsker, Kathleen Klein, Janet Iacobuzio, Sharon Epstein, Matthew Lombardo, Mimi Leahey, Elizabeth Page, Peter Brash); Days of Our Lives (James E. Reilly, Maura Penders, Sheri Anderson, Dena Higley, Mel Brez, Ethel M. Brez, Marlene Clark Poulter, Dorothy Ann Purser, Fran Myers, Maralyn Thoma, Michelle Poteet Lisanti, Mary Jeannett LeDonne, Elizabeth Harrower, Pete T. Rich, N. Gail Lawrence, Peggy Schibi); General Hospital (Michele Val Jean, Bill Levinson, Tom Citrano, Ralph Ellis, Linda Hamner, Cynthia M. Jervey, Elizabeth F. Snyder, Carol Saraceno, Meg Bennett, Linda Campanelli, Kimmer Ringwald, Gillian Spencer, Karen Harris, Doris Silverton)	**Children's Script**: **"A Deadly Secret: The Robert Bierer Story" – Lifestories: Families in Crisis (HBO) – Robert L. Freedman**; "Dinner Fit for a Queen" – Adventures in Wonderland (The Disney Channel) – Daryl Busby, and Deborah Raznick; "Fiesta Time" – Adventures in Wonderland (The Disney Channel) – Daryl Busby, and Tom J. Astle; "On a Roll" – Adventures in Wonderland (The Disney Channel) – Daryl Busby, and Phil Baron; "The Red Queen Crown Affair" – Adventures in Wonderland (The Disney Channel) – Daryl Busby, and Daniel Benton; "Love Off Limits" – CBS Schoolbreak Special (CBS) – Bruce Harmon; "Blood Brothers: The Joey DiPaola Story" – Lifestories: Families in Crisis (HBO) – Willy Holtzman; "Sneaky Peeks" – Square One TV (PBS) – Michael Winship
**Adapted Long Form**: **Barbarians at the Gate (HBO) – Larry Gelbart** – **tie**; **Silent Cries (NBC) – Walter Halsey Davis, and Vickie Patik** – **tie**; Family Pictures (Part 1) (ABC) – Jennifer Miller	**Original Long Form**: **The Positively True Adventures of the Alleged Texas Cheerleader-Murdering Mom (HBO) – Jane Anderson**; The Fire Next Time (Part 1) (CBS) – James Henerson; Last Light (Showtime) – Robert Eisele
**Variety - Musical, Award, Tribute, Special Event**: **"Show #2" – This Just In – Matt Neuman, Larry Arnstein, Jon Ross, Lane Sarasohn, and John Derevlany**; Bob Hope: The First 90 Years (NBC) – Buz Kohan, Linda Perret, Martha Bolton, and Gene Perret

==== Documentary ====
**Documentary – Current Events**: **"The Choice '92" – Frontline – Richard Ben Gramer, Thomas Lennon, and Michael Epstein** (PBS); "Brain Transplant" – Nova – Jon Palfreman (PBS); The Patriot Missile: Hero or Hoax? – Fred Warshofsky (A&E); "The Arming of Saudi Arabia" – Frontline – Rory O’Connor (PBS)	**Documentary – Other Than Current Events**: **"The Donner Party" – American Experience (PBS) – Ric Burns** – **tie**; **Degenerate Art (PBS) – David Grubin** – **tie**; "Inside Japan Inc." – The Pacific Century (PBS) – Carl Byker, Alex Gibney, Andrea Malin; Orson Welles: What Went Wrong? (Cinemax) – Robert Guenette; "The Fight for Democracy" – The Pacific Century (PBS) – Carl Byker; "The Smallest Survivors" – 48 Hours (CBS) – Thomas F. Flynn; "The End of Innocence" – 48 Hours (CBS) – Greg Kandra

==== News writing ====
**Television spot news script**
- **"CBS News Special Report: World Trade Center Bomb" (CBS) – Paul Fischer, Tom Harris, Jerry Cipriano**
  - "CBS Evening News: Fire at Waco" (CBS) – Jerry Cipriano, Thomas Phillips

==== Promotional writing ====
**On-air promotion**
- **"CBS Sports On-Air Promotions" (CBS) – Joseph DiPietro**
  - "CBS On-Air Promotions" – Barry Fitzsimmons

==== Animation ====
**Television graphic art animation**
- **"CBS Animation" (CBS) – Karen McInnis, Lou Palisano**
  - "4 Geist Animations" (CBS) – Linda Griffin, Bruce Jensen
  - "Inauguration Day" (CBS) – Lou Palisano

=== Radio ===
**Radio documentary**: **Out of Poverty (CBS) – Jill Landes, Evalyn Lee**; **With Liberty and Access for All** (WCBS-AM) – Roslyn Bareaux	**Radio spot news script**: **"World News This Week" (ABC) – Stuart H. Chamberlain Jr.**; "Dan Rather Reporting: Somalia Landing" (CBS) – Thomas Phillips

=== Special awards ===
Laurel Award for Screenwriting Achievement
**Ruth Prawer Jhabvala**
Laurel Award for TV Writing Achievement
**Steven Bochco**
Valentine Davies Award
**Phil Alden Robinson**
Morgan Cox Award
**Richard Powell**
Paul Selvin Award
**Gary Ross**
Edmund J. North Award
**John Furia**
