= 53rd Writers Guild of America Awards =

53rd WGA Awards
- Date: March 4, 2001
- Organized by: Writers Guild of America, East and the Writers Guild of America, West

The 53rd Writers Guild of America Awards honored the best writing in film, television and radio of 2000. Nominees for television and radio were announced on January 10, 2001, while nominees for film were announced on February 7, 2001. Winners were announced on March 4, 2001, in joint ceremonies at The Beverly Hilton hotel in Beverly Hills, California, and at the Plaza Hotel in New York City. The ceremonies were hosted by Geoffrey Rush, Greg Kinnear, Kelsey Grammer, and Stockard Channing.

== Winners and nominees ==
=== Notes ===
- Nominees for television and radio were originally broadcast between September 1, 1999, and August 31, 2000.
- Winners are in bold (some categories resulted in a tie, allowing two winners for some awards).

=== Film ===
Best Original Screenplay

**You Can Count on Me (Paramount Classics) – Kenneth Lonergan**

- Almost Famous (DreamWorks Pictures) – Cameron Crowe †
- Best in Show (Warner Bros.) – Christopher Guest and Eugene Levy
- Billy Elliot (Universal Pictures) – Lee Hall
- Erin Brockovich (Universal Pictures) – Susannah Grant
Best Adapted Screenplay

**Traffic (USA Films) – Stephen Gaghan; Based on the British series Traffik created by Simon Moore** †

- Chocolat (Miramax Films) – Robert Nelson Jacobs; Based on the novel by Joanne Harris
- Crouching Tiger, Hidden Dragon (Sony Pictures Classics) – Hui-Ling Wang, James Schamus, and Kuo Jung Tsai; Based on the novel by Wang Dulu
- High Fidelity (Buena Vista Pictures) – D.V. DeVincentis, Steve Pink, John Cusack, and Scott Rosenberg; Based on the novel by Nick Hornby
- Wonder Boys (Paramount Pictures) – Steve Kloves; Based on the novel by Michael Chabon

=== Television ===
Episodic Drama

**"In Excelsis Deo" – The West Wing (NBC) – Aaron Sorkin and Rick Cleveland**

- "Strangers and Brothers" – Once and Again (NBC) – Richard Kramer
- "The Knight in White Satin Armor" – The Sopranos (HBO) – Mitchell Burgess and Robin Green
- "Big Girls Don't Cry" – The Sopranos (HBO) – Terence Winter
- "Enemies" – The West Wing (NBC) – Rick Cleveland and Lawrence O'Donnell
- "Take This Sabbath Day" – The West Wing (NBC) – Lawrence O'Donnell, Paul Redford, and Aaron Sorkin
Episodic Comedy

**"Something Borrowed, Someone Blue" – Frasier (NBC) – Christopher Lloyd & Joe Keenan**

- "Out With Dad" – Frasier (NBC) – Joe Keenan
- "Attack of the 5'10" Woman" – Sex and the City (HBO) – Cindy Chupack
- "Ex and the City" – Sex and the City (HBO) – Michael Patrick King
- "Hey La, Hey La, My Ex-Boyfriend's Back" – Will & Grace (NBC) – Jeff Greenstein
Long Form – Original

Tie between the following two programs:
**Freedom Song (TNT) – Phil Alden Robinson and Stanley Weiser**
**"Part 1" – Sally Hemings: An American Scandal (CBS) – Tina Andrews**

- If You Believe (Lifetime) – Anthea Sylbert & Richard Romanus
- The Truth About Jane (Lifetime) – Lee Rose
Long Form – Adapted

Tie between the following two programs:
**RKO 281 (HBO) – John Logan; Based in part on the documentary The Battle Over Citizen Kane from American Experience**
**Tuesdays With Morrie (ABC) – Tom Rickman; Based on the book by Mitch Albom**

- Deliberate Intent (FX) – Andy Wolk & Lisa Mohan; Based on the book by Rod Smolla
- A House Divided (Showtime) – Paris Qualles; Based on the book Woman of Color, Daughter of Privilege: Amanda Dickson by Kent Anderson Leslie
Comedy/Variety – Talk Series

**Dennis Miller Live (HBO) – Writing supervised by Eddie Feldmann, written by Jose Arroyo, David Feldman, Jim Hanna, Leah Krinsky Atkins, Dennis Miller, Jacob Sager Weinstein, David Weiss**

- Late Night with Conan O'Brien (NBC) – Jonathan Groff, Mike Sweeney, Jon Glaser, Roy Jenkins, Michael Gordon, Brian Kiley, Brian Stack, Chris Albers, Brian McCann, Ellen Barancik, Janine Ditullio, Andy Blitz, Andy Richter, Conan O'Brien
- Late Show with David Letterman (CBS) – Bill Scheft, Carter L. Bays, Chris Harris, David Letterman, Eric Stangel, Gabe Abelson, Gerry Mulligan, Jim Mulholland, Joe Toplyn, Justin Stangel, Lee H. Ellenberg, Michael Barrie, Rob Burnett, Rodney Rothman, Steve Young, Tom Ruprecht, Craig Thomas
- Politically Incorrect (ABC) – Writing supervised by Chris Kelly, Billy Martin, written by Kevin Bleyer, Brian Jacobsmeyer, Bill Kelley, Bill Maher, Jerry Nachman, Ned Rice, Danny Vermont, Douglas M. Wilson, Scott Carter
- Saturday Night Live (NBC) – Writing supervised by Tina Fey, written by Kevin Brennan, Cindy Caponera, Robert Carlock, Jerry Collins, Steven Cragg, Tony Daro, Ali Farahnakian, Tina Fey, Hugh Fink, Richard Francese, Tim Herlihy, Steve Higgins, Adam McKay, Dennis McNicholas, Lorne Michaels, Paula Pell, J.J. Philbin, Matt Piedmont, Michael Schur, T. Sean Shannon, Andrew Steele, Scott Wainio
Comedy/Variety (Music, Awards, Tributes) – Specials

**Saturday Night Live: The 25th Anniversary Special (NBC) – Writing supervised by Tina Fey, written by Anne Beatts, Tom Davis, Tina Fey, Steve Higgins, Lorne Michaels, Marilyn Suzanne Miller, Paula Pell, Paul Shaffer, T. Sean Shannon, Michael Shoemaker, Robert Smigel**

- Evening at Pops Special Featuring the Cast of "Sesame Street" (PBS) – Christine Ferraro
Daytime Serials

**All My Children (ABC) – Agnes Nixon, Jean Passanante, Craig Carlson, Frederick Johnson, N. Gail Lawrence, Victor Miller, Juliet Law Packer, Addie Walsh, Mimi Leahey, Bettina F. Bradbury, Caroline Franz, Charlotte Gibson, David Hiltbrand, Janet Iacobuzio, Royal Miller, John PiRoman, Rebecca Taylor**

- Passions (NBC) – James E. Reilly, Ethel M. Brez, Melvin E. Brez, Shawn Morrison, Marlene Clark Poulter, Darrell Ray Thomas Jr., Peggy Schibi, Roger Newman, Pete T. Rich, Maralyn Thoma, Nancy Williams Watt
Children's Script

Tie between the following two programs:
**The Color of Friendship (Disney Channel) – Paris Qualles**
**A Storm In Summer (Showtime) – Rod Serling**

- "A Beary Bear Christmas" – Bear in the Big Blue House (Disney Channel) – Mitchell Kriegman
- Miracle in Lane 2 (Disney Channel) – Joel Kauffmann and Donald C. Yost
- "The Big Bad Wolf Fills in for Goldilocks" – Sesame Street (PBS) – Christine Ferraro

=== Documentary ===
Documentary Script – Current Events

**"John Paul II: The Millennial Pope" – Frontline (PBS) – Helen Whitney & Jane Barnes**

- "Holiday Inn Attempts to Deport Its Mexican Housekeepers for Organizing a Union" – The Awful Truth (Bravo) – Michael Moore & Nick McKinney
- "Justice for Sale" – Frontline (PBS) – Stephen Talbot & Sheila Kaplan
- "The Killer at Thurston High" – Frontline (PBS) – Michael J. Kirk & Peter J. Boyer
Documentary Script – Other than Current Events

**"George Wallace: Settin' the Woods on Fire" – American Experience (PBS) – Steve Fayer and Daniel McCabe & Paul Stekler**

- "Apocalypse!" – Frontline (PBS) – William Cran & Ben Loeterman
- "Born to Trouble: Adventures of Huckleberry Finn" – Culture Shock (PBS) – Jill Janows & Leslie Lee
- "Hitchcock, Selznick & the End of Hollywood" – American Masters (PBS) – Michael Epstein
- "Without Lying Down: Frances Marion and the Power of Women in Hollywood" – (TCM) – Based in part on the book Without Lying Down: Frances Marion and the Powerful Women of Early Hollywood written by Bridget Terry & Cari Beauchamp

=== News ===
TV News Script – Regularly Scheduled, Bulletin, or Breaking Report

**Sunday Morning Headlines (CBS) – Gail Lee**

TV News Script – Analysis, Feature, or Commentary

**Hurricane: Eyewitness to a Storm (ABC) – Glenn Steinfast & Darcy Bonfils**

- "Part II" – How To Survive A Plane Crash (ABC) – Darcy Bonfils
- Rudolph's 60th Birthday (CBS) – Jonathan W. Kaplan

=== Radio ===
Radio Documentary

**"CBS News 20th Century Roundup" (CBS Radio Network) – Paul Farry & Steve Kathan**

Radio News Script – Regularly Scheduled, Bulletin, or Breaking Report

Tie between the following two programs:
**"CBS News on the Hour" (CBS Radio Network) – Steven Gosset**
**"World News this Week" (ABC News Radio) – Michelle Gillan Fisher**

- "Romeo" (1010 Wins) – Amy Nay
- "Tom Landry: The Original Cowboy" (CBS Radio Network) – Tom Sabella
Radio News Script – Analysis, Feature or Commentary

**"The Wedding Dress" (ABC News Radio) – Mike Silverstein**

- "Dan Rather Reporting: Housing.com" (CBS Radio Network) – Paul Farry
- "Diabetes Breakthrough, No More Needles" (ABC News Radio) – Scott L. Anderson

=== Promotional writing ===
On-Air Promotion

**"NBC Promotions" (NBC) – Lori Sunshine**

- "ABC Promotions" (ABC) – Scott V. Thompson
- "NBC Promotions" (NBC) – Judie Henninger
- "NBC Promotions" (NBC) – Miranda Patterson
- "WCBS Promotions" (WCBS) – William Tynan III

=== Special awards ===
Animation Writers Caucus Animation Award

**Alan Burnett**

Laurel Award for Screenwriting Achievement

**Betty Comden and Adolph Green**

Paddy Chayefsky Laurel Award for Television Writing Achievement

**David Lloyd**

Morgan Cox Award

**George Kirgo**

Paul Selvin Award

**Quills (Fox Searchlight Pictures) – Doug Wright**

Valentine Davies Award

**Paul Haggis**
