= List of The Young and the Restless crew =

List of writers, directors and producers who have worked on the American soap opera The Young and the Restless.

== A ==
Chris Abbott
Breakdown/script writer (2006-2007)

Jill Ackles
Occasional director (2007-2008)

Valerie Ahern
Script writer (2007, 2008)

Marina Alburger
Story coordinator (2006)
Associate head writer (2007)
Script writer (2007)

Kay Alden
Script writer (1974-1980)
Breakdown writer (1980-1987)
Script editor (1983-1985, 1986-1987)
Associate head writer (1987-1997)
Co-head writer (1997-1998, 2006)
Head writer (1998-2006)
Story Consultant (2016 - present)

== B ==
Amanda L. Beall
Script writer (2008-present)
Breakdown writer (2009-present)

Bradley Bell
Script writer (1984-1986)

Maria Arena Bell
Co-head writer (2007-2008)
Head writer (2008-2012)
Co-executive producer (2008-2012)

William J. Bell
Executive producer (1973-2005)
Head writer (1973-1998)
Executive story consultant (1998-2005)

Cherie Bennett
Script writer (2006-2007, 2008)
Associate head writer (2007, 2008)

Meg Bennett
Script writer (1981-1987)

Rex M. Best
Script writer (1990-2004)

Sara A. Bibel
Story co-ordinator (2003)
Associate head writer (2004-2006)
Breakdown/script writer (2006-2007)

Jerry Birn
Associate head writer (1989-2004)

Barbara Bloom
Breakdown writer (2007)

Brent Boyd
Script Editor (2012-present)

Peter Brinckerhoff
Occasional director (2009-2011)

== C ==
Tom Casiello
Associate head writer (2006, 2009-present)

Mike Cohen
Script writer (2009)

John Conboy
Producer (1973-1976)
Executive producer (1976-1982)

Lisa Connor
Breakdown writer (2009-present)
Script writer (2009-present)

Paula Cwikly
Associate head writer (2006-2007)
Breakdown writer (2007, 2008-present)
Script writer (2007, 2008)

Camille St. Cyr
Casting Director

== D ==
Mike Denney
Director (1989-2007, 2008-present)

Rick Draughon
Associate head writer (2006)

Lynsey DuFour
Script writer (2006)
Associate head writer (2007)
Script editor (2007)

== E ==
Janice Ferri Esser
Script writer (1989-2007, 2008-present)
Script editor (2004-2007)

== F ==
John Fisher
Coordinating producer (2004-2008)
Supervising producer (2008-present)

Kathryn Foster
Production associate (1988)
Associate director (1988-1993)
Director (1993-2006)
Producer (2002-2006)

Eric Freiwald
Script writer (1982-2007, 2008-present)

== G ==
Jay Gibson
Writer (2008-2012)
Consulting Producer (2011-2012)

Bill Glenn
Director (1977-1980)

Darin Goldberg
Writer (2007, 2008)

Jeff Gottesfeld
Script writer (2006-2007, 2008)
Associate head writer (2007, 2008)

Josh Griffith
Creative consultant (2006)
Breakdown writer (2006)
Co-executive producer (2006-2008)
Head writer (2007-2008, 2012-2013, 2019-2026)
Executive producer (2008)

== H ==
Scott Hamner
Story consultant (2006)
Breakdown writer (2006)
Associate head writer (2008)
Co-head writer (2006-2007, 2008, 2008-2012)

Chip Hayes
Breakdown writer (1983-1985)

Marc Hertz
Script writer (2003-2006)

Jim Houghton
Associate head writer (1991-2006)
Script writer (2006)

== J ==
Frederick Johnson
Story consultant (1988-1989)
Script writer (1989-1993)

Grant A. Johnson
Occasional director (2008)

Trent Jones
Associate head writer (1993-2000, 2005-2006)
Co-head writer (2000-2004)

== K ==
Marla Kanelos
Writers' assistant (1990-1999)
Script writer (2008-present)

Deveney Kelly
Occasional director (2008, 2009)

H. Wesley Kenney
Co-executive producer (1982-1984)

== L ==
Dean LaMont
Camera operator (1999-2008)
Director (2005-present)

Neil Landau
Script writer (2007)

Lynn Marie Latham
Creative consultant (2005-2006)
Co-head writer (2006)
Head writer (2006-2007)
Executive producer (2006-2007)

Bernard Lechowick
Script writer (2006, 2007)
Creative consultant (2007)
Breakdown writer (2007)

Vincent Latham Lechowick
Script writer (2007)

Andrew Lee
Director (2005-present)

Jenelle Lindsay
Script writer (2007)

== M ==
Noel Maxam
Associate director (1997-2002)
Post production supervisor (2000-2002)
Director (1999-2007)

Joshua S. McCaffrey
Assistant to the producers (1997-2000)
Script writer (2000-2003, 2004-2007)

Sally McDonald
Production supervisor (1990-1993)
Associate director (1993-1997)
Director (1997-present)
Producer (2008)

Christian McLaughlin
Script writer (2007, 2008)

Shelley Meals
Writer (2007, 2008)

Beth Milstein
Script editor (2008-present)

Michael Minnis
Production staff (1990-1993)
Script writer (1994-2002)

Michael Montgomery
Occasional writer (2005-2006)
Writers' assistant (2006)
Story coordinator (2006-2007)
Script writer (2007, 2008)
Script Editor (2016-present)

Anthony Morina
Occasional director (2004, 2007-2008)
Producer (2007-2008)
Supervising producer (2008-present)

Sally Sussman Morina
Storyline consultant (1983-1986, 2005-2006)
Writer (1984-1988)
Associate head writer (2005-2006)
Head Writer (2016 - present)

== P ==
Marc Parent
Script writer (2008)
Jill Farren Phelps
Executive Producer (2012-2016)

== R ==
Thom Racina
Script writer (2008)

Paul Rauch
Story consultant (2008)
Co-executive producer (2008-present)

James E. Reilly
Breakdown writer (mid 80s)

Karen Rea
Casting director (2006-2008)

== S ==
Melissa Salmons
Script writer (2008-2009)

Jim Sayegh
Occasional director (2008)

Anne Schoettle
Story Consultant (1994)

Linda Schreiber
Script writer (1996-1998, 2003-2004, 2004-2005, 2005-2006, 2006-2007, 2008-present)

Edward J. Scott
Associate producer (1976-1978)
Producer (1978-1984)
Executive producer (1984-2001)
Supervising producer (2004-2007)

Lisa Seidman
Breakdown writer (2008)

David Shaughnessy
Producer (1992-2001)
Executive producer (2001-2004)

Hogan Sheffer
Co-head writer (2008-2012)

Natalie Minardi Slater
Production staff (1993-1997)
Breakdown writer/script editor (1998-2007, 2008, 2008-present)

John F. Smith
Script writer (1982-1986)
Associate head writer (1986-2002)
Co-head writer (2002-2006)
Co-executive producer (2003-2005)
Executive producer (2005-2006)

Brett Staneart
Writer (2007, 2008)

Diane Messina Stanley
Breakdown writer (2009)

James Stanley
Associate head writer (2006-2007, 2008-2009)

Susan Strickler
Director (2007-2009)

== W ==
Sandra Weintraub
Script writer (2004-2007, 2008-present)

== X ==
Phideaux Xavier
Director (2007-2008)

== Y ==
Mal Young
Executive Producer and Head Writer (2016-2019)

== Z ==
Teresa Zimmerman
Script writer (2009-present)
