= List of Santa Barbara crew =

List of writers, directors and producers who have worked on the American soap opera Santa Barbara.

== A ==
Sheri Anderson
Co-head writer (1989-1990)

Jane Atkins
Script writer (1989)

== B ==
Anne Howard Bailey
Co-head writer (1987-1989)

Meg Bennett
Associate head writer (1991-1993)

Rick Bennewitz
Director

Bettina F. Bradbury
Script writer (1991-1993)

Mary-Ellis Bunim
Co-executive producer (1985-1987)

== C ==
John Conboy
Co-executive producer (1991)
Executive producer (1991)

Richard Culliton
Script writer (1990-1991)

== D ==
Charlotte M. Dobbs
Script writer (1984)

Bridget and Jerome Dobson
Head writers (1984-1987, 1991-1992)
Co-executive producers (1984-1987)
Executive producers (1991-1992)

Christopher Dunn
Script writer (1991)
Associate head writer (1992-1993)

== G ==
Josh Griffith
Script writer (1988-1991)
Associate head writer (1988-1991)

Robert Guza, Jr.
Writer (1988-1991)

== H ==
Norman Hall
Director (1983-1984)
Jeffrey Hayden
Co-executive producer (1983-1984)

== J ==
Michele Val Jean
Script writer (1991)
Associate head writer (1992-1993)

== L ==
Victoria Lane
Script writer (1986)

N. Gail Lawrence
Script writer (1992-1993)

Pam Long
Head writer (1992-1993)

== M ==
Patrick Mulcahey
Script writer (1984-1990)

== P ==
Jill Farren Phelps
Executive producer (1987-1991)
Co-executive producer (1991)

Charles Pratt, Jr.
Script writer (1985-1986)
Co-head writer (1987-1989, 1989-1990)
Head writer (1989)

== R ==
Thom Racina
Associate head writer (1992-1993)

Robin Raphalian
Script Writer (1984-1993)

Paul Rauch
Executive producer (1992-1993)

Pete T. Rich
Script writer (1992-1993)

Gordon Rigsby
Director (1982-1983)

== S ==
Courtney Simon
Script writer (1986-1991)

== T ==
Millee Taggart
Writer (1992)

Maralyn Thoma
Head writer (1990-1991)
Associate head writer (1991-1992)

Gary Tomlin
Script writer (1987-1990)
