= List of Sunset Beach crew =

List of writers, directors and producers who have worked on the American soap opera Sunset Beach.

== A ==
Jane Atkins
Associate head writer (1999)

== B ==
Meg Bennett
Associate head writer (1997)
Head Writer (1997-1998)
Co-head writer (1998)

Rick Bennewitz
Director (1997-1999)

Peter Brinckerhoff
Director (entire run)

== C ==
Mike Cohen
Script writer (1998-1999)

Mick Curran
Script writer (1996-1998)

https://www.imdb.com/name/nm0192860/

Paula Cwikly
Associate head writer (1998-1999)

== D ==
Debbie Dawson
Script writer (1996-1997)

Margaret DePriest
Co-head writer (1998-1999)

Rick Draughon
Occasional associate head writer (1998-1999)
Associate head writer (1999)

Christopher Dunn
Associate head writer (entire run)

== G ==
Robert Guza, Jr.
Head writer (1996-1999)

== H ==
Dana Herko
Associate head writer (1997-1999)

== I ==
Janet Iacobuzio
Script writer (1998-1999)

Roger W. Inman
Director (1997-1998)

== J ==
Grant A. Johnson
Director (1998-1999)

== L ==
J. Robert Langston
Script writer (1997-1998)

Mary Jeannett LeDonne
Script writer (1997-1998)

Andrew Lee
Director (1999)

Michelle Poteet Lisanti
Associate head writer (entire run)

== M ==
Beth Milstein
Script editor (1996-1998)
Occasional Script writer (1997-1998)

Shelly Moore
Associate head writer (1996-1998)

Anthony Morina
Director (1999)

== R ==
James E. Reilly
Executive Story Consultant (1997-1998)

Scott Riggs
Director (1997-1998)

== S ==
Anne Schoettle
Script editor (1997-1998)
Occasional Script writer (1997-1998)

Jodie Scholz
Script writer (1998-1999)

Linda Schreyer
Script writer (1997-1998)

Lisa Seidman
Script writer (1997-1999)
Associate head writer (1997-1999)

Carla Mangia Sherwood
Associate director (1997-1998)
Director (1998-1999)

Sandy Siegel
Script writer (1997-1998)

Stuart Silver
Director (1997-1998)

Elizabeth Snyder
Associate head writer (1997-1999)

Aaron Spelling
Executive Producer (entire run)

Dennis Steinmetz
Director (1999)

== T ==
Gary Tomlin
Executive producer (entire run)
Director (entire run)

Ian Toporoff
Associate director (1997-1999)
Director (1999)

== V ==
E. Duke Vincent
Executive Producer (entire run)

== W ==
Christopher Whitesell
Co-head writer (1998-1999)

== X ==
Phideaux Xavier
Director (1998-1999)

== Z ==
Robert A. Zimmer, Jr.
Script writer (1997-1998)
