= 32nd Daytime Emmy Awards =

- Date: May 20, 2005 (Ceremony); May 14, 2005 (Creative Arts Awards)
- Location: Radio City Music Hall, New York City
- Presented by: National Academy of Television Arts and Sciences; Procter & Gamble
- Hosted by: Deidre Hall; Eric Braeden; Susan Lucci

Highlights
- Outstanding Drama Series: General Hospital
- Outstanding Game Show: Jeopardy!

Television/radio coverage
- Network: CBS
- Produced by: Dick Clark

The 32nd Daytime Emmy Awards, commemorating excellence in American daytime programming from the 2004 calendar year, was held on Friday, May 20, 2005, at Radio City Music Hall in New York City & Sponsored by Procter & Gamble. CBS televised the ceremonies in the United States. Creative Arts Emmy Awards were presented on May 14, 2005, while nominations were announced on March 2.

CBS also conducted an online viewer poll to decide the "Most Irresistible Combination".

== Nominations and winners ==
The following is a partial list of nominees, with winners in bold:

=== Outstanding Drama Series ===
- All My Children: Julie Hanan Carruthers, executive producer; Ginger Smith, producer; Karen Johnson, producer; Casey Childs, producer
- As the World Turns: Christopher Goutman, executive producer; Carole Shure, senior producer; Vivian Gundaker, producer; Kelsey Bay, coordinating producer
- **General Hospital**: Jill Farren Phelps, executive producer; Mary O'Leary, producer; Carol Scott, producer; Mercer Barrows, producer; Michelle Henry, producer; Deborah A. Genovese, coordinating producer; Charles Pratt Jr., consulting producer; Robert Guza Jr., consulting producer
- The Young and the Restless: William J. Bell, executive producer; John F. Smith, co-executive producer; Edward J. Scott, supervising producer; Kathryn Foster, producer; John Fisher, coordinating producer

=== Outstanding Lead Actor in a Drama Series ===
- Grant Aleksander (Phillip Spaulding, Guiding Light)
- Steve Burton (Jason Morgan, General Hospital)
- Roger Howarth (Paul Ryan, As the World Turns)
- Michael E. Knight (Tad Martin, All My Children)
- **Christian LeBlanc (Michael Baldwin, The Young and the Restless)**
- Jack Wagner (Nick Marone, The Bold and the Beautiful)

=== Outstanding Lead Actress in a Drama Series ===
- Martha Byrne (Lily Walsh Snyder, As the World Turns)
- Kassie DePaiva (Blair Cramer, One Life to Live)
- Susan Flannery (Stephanie Douglas Forrester, The Bold and the Beautiful)
- Nancy Lee Grahn (Alexis Davis, General Hospital)
- Juliet Mills (Tabitha Lenox, Passions)
- **Erika Slezak (Victoria Lord, One Life to Live)**
- Michelle Stafford (Phyllis Summers Abbott, The Young and the Restless)
- Kim Zimmer (Reva Shayne Lewis, Guiding Light)

=== Outstanding Supporting Actor in a Drama Series ===
- Jeff Branson (Jonathan Lavery, All My Children)
- Tyler Christopher (Nikolas Cassadine, General Hospital)
- Justin Deas (Buzz Cooper, Guiding Light)
- Rick Hearst (Ric Lansing, General Hospital)
- Cameron Mathison (Ryan Lavery, All My Children)
- **Greg Rikaart (Kevin Fisher, The Young and the Restless)**

=== Outstanding Supporting Actress in a Drama Series ===
- Crystal Chappell (Olivia Spencer, Guiding Light)
- Robin Christopher (Skye Chandler, General Hospital)
- Jeanne Cooper (Katherine Chancellor, The Young and the Restless)
- Ilene Kristen (Roxy Balsom, One Life to Live)
- **Natalia Livingston (Emily Quartermaine, General Hospital)**
- Heather Tom (Kelly Cramer, One Life to Live)

=== Outstanding Younger Actor in a Drama Series ===
- Scott Clifton (Dillon Quartermaine, General Hospital)
- Michael Graziadei (Daniel Romalotti, The Young and the Restless)
- **David Lago (Raul Guittierez, The Young and the Restless)**
- Tom Pelphrey (Jonathan Randall, Guiding Light)
- Jacob Young (JR Chandler, All My Children)

=== Outstanding Younger Actress in a Drama Series ===
- Jennifer Ferrin (Jennifer Munson, As the World Turns)
- Alexa Havins (Babe Carey, All My Children)
- Crystal Hunt (Lizzie Spaulding, Guiding Light)
- Adrianne Leon (Brook Lynn Ashton, General Hospital)
- **Eden Riegel (Bianca Montgomery, All My Children)**

=== Outstanding Drama Series Writing Team ===
- **As the World Turns**: Hogan Sheffer, head writer; Jean Passanante, co-head writer; Christopher Whitesell, associate head writer; Charlotte Gibson, associate head writer; Paula Cwikly, associate head writer; Frederick Johnson, associate head writer; Carolyn Culliton, associate head writer; Courtney Simon, associate writer; Judith Donato, associate writer; Lynn Martin, associate writer; Judy Tate, associate writer; Susan Dansby, associate writer; Meg Kelly, associate writer; Elizabeth Page, associate writer; Melissa Salmons, associate writer; Craig Heller, associate writer
- General Hospital: Robert Guza Jr., head writer; Charles Pratt Jr., head writer; Elizabeth Korte, associate head writer; Michael Conforti, writer; Michelle Patrick, writer; Garin Wolf, writer; Mary Sue Price, writer; Michele Val Jean, writer; Susan Wald, writer; Michael J. Cinquemani, writer
- Guiding Light: David Kreizman, head writer; Ellen Weston, head writer; Donna Swajeski, co-head writer; Jill Lorie Hurst, writer; Christopher Dunn, writer; Lloyd Gold, writer; Kimberly Hamilton, writer; Brett Staneart, writer; David Smilow, writer; Penelope Koechl, writer; Royal Miller, writer; Gillian Spencer, writer; Casandra Morgan, writer; Joyce Brotman, writer; Eleanor Labine, writer; Tita Bell, writer; Danielle Paige, writer
- The Young and the Restless: Kay Alden, head writer; John F. Smith, head writer; Trent Jones, co-head writer; Jerry Birn, writer; Natalie Minardi Slater, writer; Jim Houghton, writer; Marc Hertz, writer; Joshua S. McCaffrey, writer; Janice Ferri Esser, writer; Eric Freiwald, writer

=== Outstanding Drama Series Directing Team ===
- All My Children
- **General Hospital**: Joseph Behar, director; Grant A. Johnson, director; William Ludel, director; Scott McKinsey, director; Owen Renfroe, director; Christine Magarian, associate director; Ron Cates, associate director; Penny Pengra, associate director; Peter Fillmore, associate director; Ronald C. Cates, associate director; Dave MacLeod, associate director; Kathy Ladd, Stage Manager; Craig McManus, stage manager
- Guiding Light
- The Young and the Restless: Mike Denney, director; Kathryn Foster, director; Noel Maxam, director; Sally McDonald, director; Marc Beruti, associate director; Christopher Mullen, associate director; Robbin Phillips, associate director; Jennifer Scott, associate director; Tom McDermott, stage manager; Herbert A. Weaver Jr., stage manager

=== Outstanding Game/Audience Participation Show ===
- **Jeopardy!**
- The Price is Right
- Who Wants to be a Millionaire

=== Outstanding Game Show Host ===
- Bob Barker, The Price is Right
- Alex Trebek, Jeopardy!
- **Meredith Vieira, Who Wants to be a Millionaire**

=== Outstanding Talk Show ===
- Dr. Phil: Carla Pennington Stewart, executive producer
- **The Ellen DeGeneres Show**: Ellen DeGeneres, executive producer; Mary Connelly, executive producer; Ed Glavin, executive producer; Andy Lassner, co-executive producer
- Live With Regis and Kelly: Regis Philbin, executive producer; Michael Gelman, executive producer
- Soap Talk: Kari Sagin, executive producer
- The View: Bill Geddie, executive producer; Barbara Walters, executive producer; Alexandra Cohen, supervising producer; Patrick Ignozzi, coordinating producer; Matthew J. Strauss, coordinating producer; Jennifer Brookman, producer; Jonathan Faulhaber, producer; Dana Goodman, producer; Audrey Jones, producer; Jamie Kotkin-Hammer, producer; Gregory Piccioli, producer; Rachel Weintraub, producer

=== Outstanding Talk Show Host ===
- **Ellen DeGeneres, The Ellen DeGeneres Show**
- Phil McGraw, Dr. Phil
- Regis Philbin and Kelly Ripa, Live With Regis and Kelly
- Lisa Rinna and Ty Treadway, Soap Talk
- Barbara Walters, Meredith Vieira, Star Jones Reynolds, Joy Behar and Elisabeth Hasselbeck, The View

=== Outstanding Service Show ===
- 30 Minute Meals
- Barefoot Contessa
- Great Hotels
- **Martha Stewart Living**
- This Old House

=== Outstanding Service Show Host ===
Two winners were recorded in the Outstanding Service Show Host category, as a tie was recorded in the race between Michael Chiarello and Bobby Flay.

- **Michael Chiarello, Easy Entertaining with Michael Chiarello**
- **Bobby Flay, Boy Meets Grill**
- Emeril Lagasse, Essence of Emeril
- Martha Stewart, Martha Stewart Living
- Bob Vila, Bob Vila's Home Again

=== Outstanding Special Class Series ===
- Animal Rescue with Alex Paen
- A Baby Story
- Breakfast With The Arts
- Judge Judy
- **Starting Over**

=== Outstanding Children's Animated Program ===
- **Peep and the Big Wide World**
- Arthur
- Dora the Explorer
- Kim Possible
- Toddworld

=== Outstanding Special Class Animated Program ===
- The Batman
- Duck Dodgers
- **Rolie Polie Olie**

=== Outstanding Performer In An Animated Program ===
- Mel Brooks (Wiley, Jakers! The Adventures of Piggley Winks)
- Joan Cusack (The Narrator, Peep and the Big Wide World)
- Kevin Michael Richardson (The Joker, The Batman)
- Christy Carlson Romano, (Kim, Kim Possible)
- **Henry Winkler (Norville, Clifford's Puppy Days)**

=== Outstanding Pre-School Children's Series ===
- Blue's Clues
- **Sesame Street**
- Paz the Penguin
- Hi-5

=== Outstanding Children's Series ===
- Endurance: Hawaii
- Jeff Corwin Unleashed
- Postcards from Buster
- **Reading Rainbow**
- ZOOM
- Dark Oracle

=== Outstanding Performer In A Children's Series ===
- LeVar Burton (Himself, Reading Rainbow)
- **Kevin Clash (Elmo, Sesame Street)**
- Jeff Corwin (Himself, Jeff Corwin Unleashed)
- Donovan Patton (Joe, Blue's Clues)

=== Outstanding Sound Editing - Live Action and Animation ===
- **Roy Braverman, Daisuke Sawa, Thomas Syslo, Mike Garcia, Mark Howlett, Timothy Borquez, Mark Keefer, Mark Keatts, Eric Freeman, Keith Dickens, Jeff Hutchins and Doug Andham (The Batman)**
- **Doug Andham, Daisuke Sawa, Mark Keefer, Roy Braverman, Jeff Hutchins, Mark Howlett, Eric Freeman, Timothy Borquez, Mike Garcia, Brian F. Mars, Kerry K. Brody, Mark Keatts and Thomas Syslo (Xiaolin Showdown)**
- George Brooks, Mark Keatts, Mark Keefer, Tim Isle, Kerry K. Brody and Robert Hargreaves (Duck Dodgers)
- Rick Hinson, Elizabeth Hinson and Jeffrey Kettle (Jakers! The Adventures of Piggley Winks)
- Paca Thomas and Robbi Smith (Kim Possible)

=== Outstanding Sound Mixing - Live Action and Animation ===
- **Melissa Ellis and Fil Brown (Kim Possible)**
- Christopher Maddalone and Dirk Sciarrotta (115th Annual Tournament of Roses Parade)
- Juan Aceves (Dora the Explorer)
- Blake Norton, Bob Schott, Dick Maitland, and Carla Bandini-Lory (Sesame Street)
- Christopher Allan and Dan Lesiw (ZOOM)

=== Lifetime Achievement Award ===
- **Merv Griffin**

== Most Irresistible Combination ==
CBS conducted an online viewer poll to decide the "Most Irresistible Combination". The winners were announced live during the Emmys broadcast.

- Ryan and Greenlee Lavery, All My Children
- Jack and Carly Snyder, As the World Turns
- Nick Marone and Bridget Forrester, The Bold and the Beautiful
- Shawn Brady and Belle Black, Days of Our Lives
- Bo and Hope Brady, Days of Our Lives
- Nikolas and Emily Cassadine, General Hospital
- Gus and Harley Aitoro, Guiding Light
- Todd and Blair Manning, One Life to Live
- Sam Bennett and Ivy Winthrop, Passions
- Luis and Sheridan Lopez-Fitzgerald, Passions
- Jack and Phyllis Abbott, The Young and the Restless
