= 38th Writers Guild of America Awards =

38th WGA Awards
- Date: 1986
- Organized by: Writers Guild of America, East and the Writers Guild of America, West

The 38th Writers Guild of America Awards honored the best television, and film writers of 1985. Winners were announced in 1986.

== Winners and nominees ==
=== Film ===
Winners are listed first highlighted in boldface.

**Best Screenplay Written Directly for the Screen**: **Witness, Written by Earl W. Wallace and William Kelley; Story by Earl W. Wallace, Pamela Wallace and William Kelley**; Back to the Future, Written by Robert Zemeckis and Bob Gale; Cocoon, Written by Tom Benedek; Story by David Saperstein; Mask, Written by Anna Hamilton Phelan; The Purple Rose of Cairo, Written by Woody Allen	**Best Screenplay Based on Material from Another Medium**: **Prizzi's Honor, Screenplay by Richard Condon and Janet Roach; Based on the novel by Richard Condon**; Agnes of God, Screenplay by John Pielmeier; Based on his play; The Color Purple, Screenplay by Menno Meyjes; Based on the novel by Alice Walker; Out of Africa, Screenplay by Kurt Luedtke; Based on the book Isak Dinesen: The Life of a Story Teller by Judith Thurman and the book Silence Will Speak by Errol Trzebinski; The Trip to Bountiful, Screenplay by Horton Foote; Based on his play

=== Television ===
**Episodic Comedy**: **"Pilot" – Moonlighting (ABC) – Glenn Gordon Caron** (Tie with Steambath); **"Madison Avenue Madness" – Steambath (Showtime) – David Pollock and Elias Davis** (Tie with Moonlighting); "Fairy Tales Can Come True" – Cheers (NBC) – Sam Simon; "The Executive's Executioner" – Cheers (NBC) – Heide Perlman; "Goodbye, Mr. Fish" – The Cosby Show (NBC) – Earl Pomerantz; "The Uh-Oh Feeling" – Webster (ABC) – Steven Sunshine and Madeline Sunshine	**Episodic Drama**: **"Unusual Occurrence" – Cagney & Lacey (CBS) – Georgia Jeffries**; "Brother's Keeper" – Miami Vice (NBC) – Anthony Yerkovich; "Who Says It's Fair" – Cagney & Lacey (CBS) – Patricia Green; "Child Witness" – Cagney & Lacey (CBS) – Deborah Arakelian; "A Wind from the East" – Call to Glory (ABC) – Josef Anderson; "Watt a Way to Go" – Hill Street Blues (NBC) – David Milch, Roger Director, Steven Bochco and Jeffrey Lewis; "Sweet Dreams" – St. Elsewhere (NBC) – John Masius and Tom Fontana
**Daytime Serials**: **One Life to Live (ABC) – Peggy O'Shea, Sam Hall, S. Michael Schnessel, Lanie Bertram, Ethel Brez, Mel Brez, Barbara Morgenroth, Don Wallace, Peter Swet and Eugenie Hunt**; Guiding Light (CBS) – Pete T. Rich, Elaine Potwardoski, Emily Squires, John Kuntz, N. Gail Lawrence, Stephen Demorest, Christopher Whitesell, Megan McTavish, Trent Jones, Jeff Ryder, Addie Walsh and Robin Amos; The Edge of Night (ABC) – Lee Sheldon, David Snell, Marty Ross and Eric Rubinton	**Adapted Drama Anthology**: **The Burning Bed (NBC) – Rose Leiman Goldemberg**
**Original/Adapted Comedy Anthology**: **The Ratings Game (Showtime) – Michael Barrie and Jim Mulholland**	**Original Drama Anthology**: **Do You Remember Love (CBS) – Vickie Patik**; Not My Kid (CBS) – Christopher Knopf and Beth Polson
**Children's Show**: **"Booker" – WonderWorks (PBS) – Charles Johnson, John Allman and Avon Kirkland**; "Babies Having Babies" – CBS Schoolbreak Special (CBS) – Kathryn J. Montgomery and Jeffrey Auerbach; "Fuzz Bucket" – Wonderful World of Disney (ABC) – Mick Garris; "Time Flyer" – Wonderful World of Disney (ABC) – Mark Rosman

=== Special awards ===
Laurel Award for Screenwriting Achievement
**Waldo Salt**
Laurel Award for TV Writing Achievement
**Richard Levinson, and William Link**
Valentine Davies Award
**Ronald Austin**
Morgan Cox Award
**Arthur E. Orloff**
