= Brez =

Brez may refer to:

== People ==
- Ethel Brez, American television soap opera writer
- Karina Brez, Miss Florida USA
- Mel Brez, American television soap opera writer

== Places ==
- Brez, Trentino, Italy

== Other ==
- Brez (clothing)
