= Birn =

Birn or variants may refer to:

== BIRN ==
- Biomedical Informatics Research Network (BIRN), a geographically distributed virtual community of shared resources relating to diagnosis and treatment of disease
- Balkan Investigative Reporting Network
- Berklee College of Music Internet Radio Network

== Birn or Birns ==
- Alex Birns (1907–1975), Jewish American mobster
- Jack Birns (1919-2008), American photographer
- Jerry Birn (1923-2009), American television writer
- Laura Birn (born 1981), Finnish actress
- Laura Bryan Birn (born 1965), American actress

== Other uses ==
- Dál Birn
- Lóegaire Birn Búadach, Óengus Osrithe's son
- Nem Moccu Birn (died 654), Irish saint
