= Biren =

Biren and Biron is an English and Indian given name and an English surname. Notable people with the name include:

== Given name ==
- Biren Kumar Basak (born 1951), Indian weaver
- Biren Basnet (born 1994), Bhutanese footballer
- Biren De (1926–2011), Indian painter
- Biren Deka (born 1947), Indian politician
- Biren Dutta (1910–1992), Indian politician
- Biren Ealy (born 1984), American football player
- Biren Sing Engti (born 1945), Indian politician
- Biren Mitra (1917–1978), Indian politician
- Biren Jyoti Mohanty, Indian film editor
- Biren Nag, Indian film director
- Biren Roy (1909–1996), Indian politician
- Biren Sikder (born 1949), Bengali politician
- Biron House (1884–1930), English cricketer

=== Middle name ===
- N. Biren Singh (born 1961), Indian politician

== Surname ==
- Huang Biren (born 1969), Singaporean actress
- Joan E. Biren (born 1944), American artist

== See also ==
- Papestra biren, a moth of the family Noctuidae
- Biren Technology, a Chinese semiconductor company
- Bireuën
- Birken (disambiguation)
- Birn (disambiguation)
