= Nancy Williams Watt =

American writer (born 1948)

Nancy Williams Watt is an American writer known for her work on television soap operas. She was born in Brooklyn, New York on June 9, 1948, to Associated Press editor Edward Williams and newswoman Sheila O'Brien Williams Barnes.

== Positions held ==
All My Children

- Secretary to Agnes Nixon, Wisner Washam, Jack Wood, Lorraine Broderick, Caroline Franz et al. (1979–1981)

Days of Our Lives

- Script Writer (April 2, 2012 – July 27, 2012)
- Associate Head Writer (September 13, 2011 – March 30, 2012)

Search for Tomorrow

- Script Writer/Breakdown Writer (1983–1985)

Passions (hired by James E. Reilly)

- Script Writer (1999 – September 2007)

Guiding Light

- Script Writer/Outline Writer (1986–1993)
- Co-Head Writer (1994 – November 1994)
- Script Editor/Associate Headwriter (1993–1999)

== Awards and nominations ==
She has been nominated for nine Daytime Emmy awards in the category Outstanding Drama Series Writing Team from 1989 to 2003, and won three times, twice for Guiding Light in 1990 and 1993 and also for Days of Our Lives in 2011–2012. Her first nomination was shared with Pamela K. Long, Trent Jones, Nancy Curlee, Stephen Demorest, Richard Culliton, Pete T. Rich, Melissa Salmons, and N. Gail Lawrence, while her first win was shared with the previous plus Jeff Ryder, Garret Foster, Peter Brash, and Patty Gideon Sloan.

Williams Watt has also been nominated for seven Writers Guild of America Awards, in the Daytime Serials category, from 1989 to 2001, and won once in 1992. Her first nomination was shared with Pamela K. Long, Stephen Demorest, Trent Jones, Melissa Salmons, Pete T. Rich, Nancy Curlee, N. Gail Lawrence, Richard Culliton, and Nancy Franklin, while her win was shared with the latter, minus Jones, Culliton and Franklin, and including James E. Reilly, Bill Elverman, and Michael Conforti.

Daytime Emmy Awards

WINS

- (1990 & 1993; Best Writing; Guiding Light)
- (2012; Best Writing; Days of Our Lives)

NOMINATIONS

- (1989, 1992 & 1999; Best Writing; Guiding Light)
- (2001, 2002 & 2003; Best Writing; Passions)

Writers Guild of America Award

WINS

- (1992 season; Guiding Light)
- (2014 season; Days of Our Lives)

NOMINATIONS

- (1989, 1995, 1996, 1998 & 1999 seasons; Guiding Light)
- (2001 season; Passions)
- (2013 season; Days of Our Lives)

== Head writing tenure ==
| Preceded by Patrick Mulcahey | Head writer of Guiding Light (with Stephen Demorest: April 18, 1994 – October 25, 1994) (with Leah Laiman and Millee Taggart: June 6, 1994 – October 25, 1994) (with Patrick Mulcahey: March 17, 1994 - September 2, 1994); March 17, 1994 - October 25, 1994 | Succeeded by Stephen Demorest and Millee Taggart |
| Preceded by Douglas Anderson | Head writer of Guiding Light (with Douglas Anderson and Peggy Sloane); April 1995 - July 14, 1995 | Succeeded by Megan McTavish |
| Preceded by Megan McTavish | Head writer of Guiding Light (with Michael Conforti and Victor Miller); October 25, 1996 - March 28, 1997 | Succeeded by James Harmon Brown and Barbara Esensten |
