= Lynsey DuFour =

American television writer

Lynsey DuFour is an American television soap opera writer.

== Positions held ==
All My Children

- Script Writer: 2009

Keeping up with the Kardashians

- Story Editor

The Young and the Restless

- Script Editor: October 2007 - December 24, 2007
- Associate Head Writer: 2007 - December 24, 2007
- Breakdown Writer: January 2007 - 2007
- Script Writer: September 2006 - January 2007
- Production Staff : 2004 – August 2006

Daytime Dish

- Talk show about soap operas that was created in the spring of 2003 by Erica Meyer and Lynsey DuFour. Previous hosts include Hadley Klein and Katie Pelton.

== Awards and nominations ==
Writers Guild of America Award

- Nomination, 2006 season, Best Writing, The Young And The Restless (Lynn Marie Latham, Kay Alden, John F. Smith, Scott Hamner, Josh Griffith, Sally Sussman Morina, Sara A. Bibel, Paula Cwikly, Jim Houghton, Trent Jones, Natalie Minardi Slater, Lynsey DuFour, Janice Ferri Esser, Eric Freiwald, Marc Hertz, Bernard Lechowick, Joshua McCaffrey, Linda Schreiber, Sandra Weintraub, and Sherman Magidson.)

Daytime Emmy Award

- Nomination, 2006 season, Best Writing, "The Young And The Restless"
