= Lewis Arlt =

American director, actor, and writer

Lewis Arlt is an American director, actor, and writer. He has been nominated for Daytime Emmys (Outstanding Supporting Actor in a Daytime, 1979, and Outstanding Drama Series Writing Team, 1995), and four Writers Guild of America Awards (he has won three times: 1993 (Loving), 1994 (General Hospital), and 1995).

== Acting credits ==
- Confessions of A Dangerous Mime
- Fuck
- Hamlet
- Trinity
- Law & Order
- Drug Wars: The Cocaine Cartel
- Orpheus Descending
- The Littlest Victims
- See You In The Morning
- Guiding Light
- Tales From The Darkside (as Michael Nelson in Payment Overdue - 1988)
- Ryan's Hope
- Another World (as David Thatcher from 1983-1984 & Ken Jordan from 1990–1991)
- He Knows You're Alone
- The Andros Targets (1977)
- Search for Tomorrow

== Writing credits ==
He has written on Loving, Ryan's Hope, General Hospital and Another World.
