= Form LM-2 =

Form filed by labor unions in the USA

Form LM-2 is filed with the Office of Labor-Management Standards (OLMS) by unions in the United States that details how a union spent funds in the past year. It is the most detailed report labor organizations are required to file.

== History ==
Form LM-2, along with several other forms, was developed by the OLMS to fulfill the Labor Management Reporting and Disclosure Act of 1959 reporting requirements. In 2002, the OLMS rewrote parts of LM-2 in an effort to increase transparency. Since 2005, all organizations have been required to file the form electronically.
