= Bettina F. Bradbury =

American screenwriter (1955–2019)

- Born: Bettina Francion Bradbury; July 22, 1955
- Died: January 13, 2019 (aged 63)
- Education: University of Southern California
- Occupation: Screenwriter
- Children: 1
- Father: Ray Bradbury

Bettina Francion Bradbury (July 22, 1955 – January 13, 2019) was an American television soap opera screenwriter. She was the daughter of American science fiction writer Ray Bradbury.

== Career ==
Bettina Bradbury attended the Westlake School for Girls in Los Angeles, California, and went on to enroll at the USC School of Cinematic Arts. Her first venture into daytime television was as a writer on Santa Barbara from 1987 to 1993. She went on to write episodes of All My Children between 1995 and 2003, for which she won three Daytime Emmy Awards. She then wrote for One Life to Live in 2006 before joining Days of our Lives as a writer in 2007. She was also an assistant to John Conboy.

== Positions held ==
- All My Children (hired by Megan McTavish)
  - Screenwriter: 1993 – 2006
- As the World Turns (hired by Jean Passanante)
  - Screenwriter: 2006 – 2007
- Capitol
  - Screenwriter: 1984 – 1987
- Days of Our Lives (hired by Hogan Sheffer)
  - Screenwriter: 2007 – 2008
- One Life to Live (hired by Dena Higley)
  - Screenwriter: 2006
- Santa Barbara
  - Screenwriter: 1991 – 1993

== Awards and nominations ==
- Daytime Emmy Award
  - Nominations, 1995, 1999, 2001–2003, 2006 Best Writing, All My Children
  - Wins, 1996–1998, Best Writing, All My Children
  - First nomination shared with: Agnes Nixon, Megan McTavish, Hal Corley, Frederick Johnson, N. Gail Lawrence, Jeff Beldner, Karen Lewis, Elizabeth Smith (writer), Michelle Patrick, Ralph Wakefield, and Pete T. Rich
- Writers Guild of America Award
  - Wins, 1996, 1998, 2000, 2001, 2003, 2012 seasons, All My Children
  - Nominations, 1992, 1995–2001, and 2003 seasons, All My Children
  - Win, 1991 season, Santa Barbara

== Personal life ==
Bettina Bradbury had one son, actor Danny Karapetian.
