= Fran Myers =

American actress

- Born: Frances Myers; 1950 (age 76); New York, New York, U.S.
- Other names: Francie Myers
- Education: Professional Children's School; Hunter College
- Occupations: Actress, writer
- Years active: 1959–1969
- Spouse(s): Roger Newman (m. 1975; died 2010)

Frances Myers (born 1950) (credited initially as Francie Myers and later Fran Myers) is an American television soap opera writer and actress. She has written for soaps for nearly 25 years. She also had a contract role on CBS soap opera Guiding Light as Peggy Scott Fletcher from 1965 to 1979.

== Early life and career ==
Born and raised in New York, Myers attended city public schools, the Professional Children's School (class of 1967), and later Hunter College, where she studied Russian and Italian.

In 1958 Myers made her professional debut as Betsy in the radio serial The Couple Next Door, followed, in December 1959, by her TV show on CBS as Bertha—the newly gender-shifted version of Bertie's younger brother—in Camera Three's holiday-themed Saki adaptation, "The Toys of Peace".

During her extended Guiding Light stint, Myers made at least two off Broadway appearances: most notably, a featured role in Margaret Webster's 1968 revival of Graham Greene's Carving a Statue, at the Gramercy Theatre; she also appeared in the 1975 Playwrights Horizons production of Roma Greth's Quality of Mercy.

Myers also had a recurring role on The White Shadow in the latter half of Season 2 as Kathy Plunkett, a dating interest of Coach Ken Reeves (Ken Howard). Formerly a member of Writers Guild of America, East, Myers later left and maintained financial core status.

== Personal life ==
From 1975 until his death in 2010, Myers was married to fellow actor-turned-writer—and Guiding Light castmate—Roger Newman, with whom she had two sons, John Howard and Charles Andrew.
