= Jack Birns =

American photographer

Jack Birns (1919–2008) was an American photographer. He was an award-winning foreign correspondent for Life magazine, and the President of BIRNS Incorporated.

== Early experiences ==
Jack Birns was born to Russian immigrants Morris and Becky Birnbaum, in Cleveland, Ohio March 22, 1919. After graduating from Ohio Northern University in 1941 with a degree in English Literature and Journalism, he entered the newspaper business as a cub reporter working for the Scripps-Howard feature service (NEA), United Press, and the International News Service, all in Cleveland. After a brief departure from journalism to manage newsreel theaters in Cleveland and Buffalo, Birns returned as a photographer-writer for NEA-ACME (Scripps-Howard photo service) and became the bureau chief of the five-state Acme photo bureau headquartered in Cleveland.

== Photojournalism ==
In 1946 Birns moved to Los Angeles, California, and free-lanced as a magazine photographer for a year, during which time he set a record for free-lancers working for LIFE: 30 pages and a cover in 6-months’ work. LIFE hired Birns to cover the Civil war in China and during 1947 he set another record for LIFE staff photographers for pictures and pages, as he captured on film a vast country undergoing fundamental changes, and a society characterized by poverty, petty crime, homelessness and military rule. During this time, Birns was paired with journalist Roy Rowan. This energetic war coverage (China, Burma, India, Philippines, and Malaysia) won for Birns a coveted recognition from the Overseas Press Club of America. For the first time in its history the OPC established a special award for photographers to honor Birns's work, and the award was given to Birns by General George C. Marshall, chief of staff during WWII and, later, Secretary of State.

== Business ==
After returning to the USA, Birns established the motion picture firm of Birns & Sawyer, along with Clifford Sawyer. In 1954 Birns & Sawyer built the first underwater motion picture camera housings for the US Navy and, in 1961, the Navy’s first underwater lights. Birns supplied the underwater lighting for the US Man-in-the-Sea program, and for Sea Labs I, II, and III. He also established a separate Birns & Sawyer lens grinding facility in Riverside County to make telephoto lenses for the US Air Force and Navy. In 1979 Birns left Birns & Sawyer to start BIRNS, Inc., devoted to all types of energy-related underwater and high-performance lighting. BIRNS's lights are now used by the navies of more than 23 countries, 83% of USA-based commercial nuclear power stations, NASA at KSC, and many others.

In 1985 the oldest shipwreck ever found (approximately 3,500 years old) was excavated using BIRNS lights; among other underwater archaeological finds he illuminated were the Civil War Ironclad "Monitor", the "Hamilton", the "Scourge", the "Andrea Doria", and the "Titanic". In March 1984 the Los Angeles City Council passed a resolution honoring Birns’s 30 years of work there, and in October 1984 his photos hung in New York and Washington as part of a LIFE magazine exhibit of the best pictures of the 1950–1960 decade.

== Retirement ==
Birns retired from active involvement in business in 1987, to spend more time with his family. He continued to be a guest speaker on pre-revolutionary China and artistic photography. He published a book, Assignment: Shanghai; Pictures on the Eve of Revolution, a picture-chronicle of life in Pre-Communist China, and he donated his services to teach adult swimming at the YMCA and, later, to teach photography to the blind and sight-impaired at the Braille Institute (Los Angeles.)

== Death ==
Jack Birns died in Los Angeles on February 10, 2008. He was predeceased by his wife and oldest son. He was survived by six children.

== Sources ==
- BBC article on Jack Birns
- Obituary: Jack Birns
