= Patrick Ignozzi =

American television executive

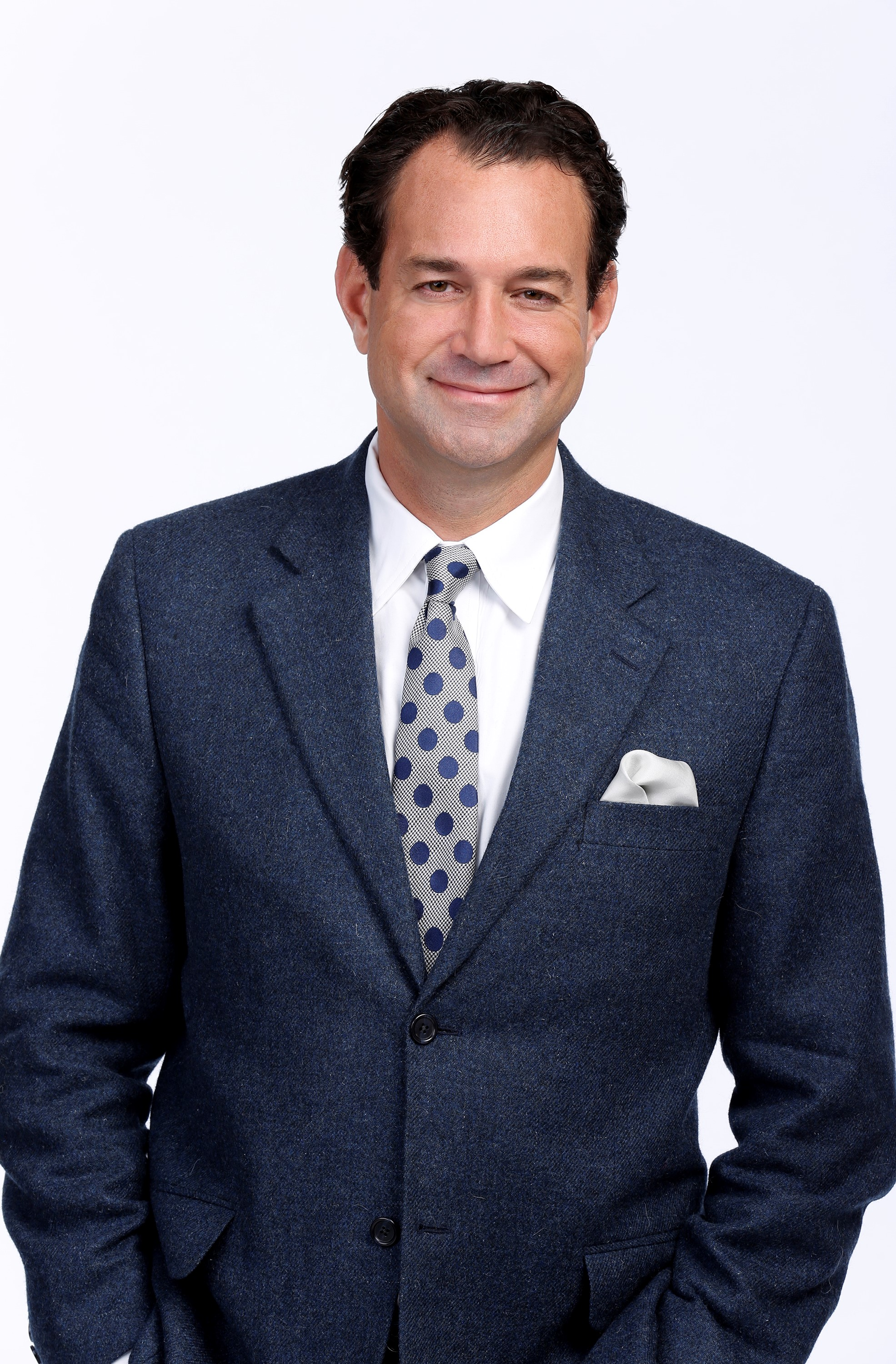
Patrick Ignozzi

Patrick Michael Ignozzi is an American television executive who was most recently the executive producer of Maria Bartiromo’s Mornings with Maria program on the Fox Business channel.

Prior to joining Fox, Ignozzi was vice president of development and syndication for the ABC Daytime Media Group. He also served as vice president of current programming for the programs ”The Chew” and “Who Wants to Be a Millionaire”.

Ignozzi served for 16 years as senior producer for “The View” on the ABC Television Network. Ignozzi also served as supervising producer for “The View”. In 2002, he won a Daytime Emmy Award for Outstanding Producing for that show. Ignozzi also produced several segments for “The View” that earned him his 16th Daytime Emmy Award nomination for “Outstanding Talk Show.”

Before joining ABC, Ignozzi was a producer for King World Productions. He was also a traveling booker and researcher for NBC Television’s “Today Show.” A graduate of Seton Hall University, Ignozzi holds a B.A. in criminal law with a minor in Spanish literature.
