= Biron House =

English cricketer (1884–1930)

Personal information
- Full name: Biron Howe House
- Born: 18 December 1884; Langport, Somerset, England
- Died: 3 June 1930 (aged 45); Langaller, Creech St Michael, Somerset, England

Domestic team information
- Years: Team
- 1912–1914: Somerset

Career statistics
Competition	FC
Matches	3
Runs scored	30
Batting average	10.00
100s/50s	0/0
Top score	19*
Catches/stumpings	3/–
- Source: CricketArchive, 22 December 2015

Biron Howe House (18 December 1884 – 3 June 1930), played first-class cricket for Somerset in three matches between 1912 and 1914. He was born at Langport, Somerset and died at Creech St Michael, also in Somerset.

House was a wicketkeeper and a lower-order batsman. He made only 30 runs in first-class innings and took just three catches. In his first-ever match, he batted at No 11 and scored an unbeaten 19 out of a last-wicket partnership of 34 with Elliot Tillard in the match against Gloucestershire. This was his highest first-class score.
