= Rick Bennewitz =

American television soap opera director

Rick Bennewitz (November 10, 1936 – January 9, 1999) was an American television soap opera director, best known for shooting location sequences for various soap operas. The last episode of Sunset Beach he directed was dedicated to his memory.

== Positions held ==
Land of the Lost

- Director (September 18 - November 27, 1976)

Santa Barbara

- Director (September 28, 1984 - January 15, 1993)

Sunset Beach

- Director (January 6, 1997 - February 5, 1999)

== Awards and nominations ==
Daytime Emmy Award

- Win, 1991, Directing, Santa Barbara (shared with Peter Brinckerhoff, Michael Gliona, Rob Schiller, Jeanine Guarneri-Frons (wife of Brian Frons), Pamela Fryman, Robin Raphaelian)
- Win, 1990, Directing, Santa Barbara

Emmy Award

- Win, 1971, Directing, The Andersonville Trial
