= Casandra Morgan =

American soap opera script writer

Casandra Morgan is an American television soap opera script writer.

== Positions held ==
General Hospital

- Occasional Script Writer (January–March 2004)

Guiding Light

- Associate Head Writer (June 25, 2004 – October 21, 2005)

Port Charles

- Associate Head Writer (1998–2003)

== Awards and nominations ==
Daytime Emmy Award

- Nomination, 2005, Best Writing, Guiding Light

Writers Guild of America Award

- Win, 2004, Best Writing, Guiding Light
