= John PiRoman =

American writer (1951–2014)

John Faro PiRoman (July 10, 1951 – March 11, 2014) was an American television writer. He was born in Havana, Cuba and immigrated to the United States in 1961. Besides working on the daytime series, All My Children, PiRoman also wrote one episode of St. Elsewhere and several episodes of HBO's Happily Ever After: Fairy Tales for Every Child. His stage plays Sons of Don Juan, The Palace of Amateurs, Holy Mary and Amerikanski Toileti have been produced in theaters throughout the country. His translation of Anton Chekhov's The Cherry Orchard has also been widely produced. He is a graduate of Georgetown University, where he was active in the Mask & Bauble Dramatic Society where he wrote, directed and acted.. On March 11, 2014, he died at his home in Miami, Florida, at the age of 62.

== Positions held ==
All My Children

- Script Writer (1998–2004)

== Awards and nominations ==
Daytime Emmy Award

- Nomination, 1999, 2001–2004, Best Writing, All My Children

Writers Guild of America Award

- Win, 2000–2003, Best Writing, All My Children
- Nomination, 1999, Best Writing, All My Children
