= Laura Bryan Birn =

American actress (born 1965)

Laura Bryan Birn (born April 3, 1965, in Chicago) is an American actress known for her role as Paul Williams' assistant, Lynne Bassett, in the soap opera, The Young and the Restless. On contract from 1988 to 2005, it was then stated she had been dropped to recurring, though she never appeared again.

She is the daughter of television writer Jerry Birn.
