= Elizabeth Snyder =

American television writer

Elizabeth Snyder (formerly known as Betsy Snyder) was an American television soap opera writer. She turned down the position of co-Head Writer of One Life to Live in November 2012. That position was accepted by Thom Racina. Died November 16, 2021, at age 60.

== Positions held ==
All My Children (hired by Ginger Smith & Marlene McPherson)

- Co-Head Writer: April 29, 2013 – September 2, 2013

Another World (hired by Michael Malone)

- Breakdown Writer: 1996
- Script Writer: 1995

The Bold and the Beautiful (CBS Daytime; hired by Bradley Bell)

- Associate Head Writer: June 9, 2006 - January 21, 2008, April 16, 2008 - March 2010
- Storyline Consultant: November 22, 2004 - June 8, 2006, December 21, 2009 - March 9, 2010

Dangerous Women (hired by Reg Watson)

- Breakdown Writer: 1991

Days of Our Lives (hired by Christopher Whitesell)

- Breakdown Writer: February 2011-August 2012, September 14, 2016 – 2021

General Hospital (ABC Daytime)(hired by Gene Palumbo)

- Breakdown Writer: 1989 - 1993

Poor Nastya (Bednaya Nastya; suggested by Paul Rauch)

- Co-Head Writer (2003 - 2004)

Port Charles (spin-off of GH; hired by Lynn Marie Latham)

- Associate Head Writer: 1998 - 2000

Sunset Beach (NBC Daytime) (hired by Josh Griffith)

- Breakdown Writer: January 6, 1997 – 1999

== Awards and nominations ==
Snyder was nominated a total of seven times for a Daytime Emmy Award. She won in 2010 (shared with Bradley P. Bell, Head Writer; Kay Alden (ex HW of Y&R), Co-Head Writer; Michael Minnis, Co-Head Writer; Tracey Ann Kelly, Writer; Patrick Mulcahey; Rex M. Best; John F. Smith; Adam Dusevoir; Shannon Bradley; Jerry Birn) and 2012.

Daytime Emmy Award

- Nomination, 2006 & 2010, Best Writing, The Bold and The Beautiful
- Nomination, 1996, Best Writing, Another World

Writers Guild of America Award

- Nomination, 2011 season, DOOL
- Nomination, 1997 season, Sunset Beach
- Nomination, 1993 season, General Hospital

Preceded by Lorraine Broderick	Head Writer of All My Children (with Marlene McPherson); April 29, 2013 - September 2, 2013	Succeeded by Show cancelled
