= Jane Atkins =

American screenwriter

Jane Atkins is an American film & television writer and actress. She is a native of Florida. As an actress, she has performed with the American Conservatory Theater, the Actors’ Theatre of Louisville, South Coast Repertory, the Oregon Shakespeare Festival and the London Young Vic. Atkins is a member of the Writers Guild of America and the Academy of Television Arts and Sciences. She has worked for Disney, ABC, NBC, CBS, and Lifetime TV as well as penning several nature documentaries which aired on PBS. She served as Director of Playmaking for the Virginia Avenue Project.

== Positions held ==
Days of Our Lives

- Script Writer (2002–December 28, 2004)

General Hospital

- Associate Head Writer (1996-1997)

Guiding Light

- Associate Head Writer (1994)

One Life to Live

- Script Writer (1998)

Santa Barbara

- Script Writer (1989)

Sunset Beach

- Associate Head Writer (1999 - December 31, 1999)

== Awards and nominations ==
Daytime Emmy Award

- Nomination, 1997, Best Writing, General Hospital
- Win, 1989, Best Writing, Santa Barbara

Writers Guild of America Award

- Nomination, 1996, Best Writing, General Hospital
- Nomination, 1994, Best Writing, Guiding Light
