= Office of Labor-Management Standards =

U.S. federal agency

Agency overview
- Formed: 1959
- Jurisdiction: Federal government of the United States
- Headquarters: Frances Perkins Building Washington, D.C.
- Employees: ~200
- Agency executives: Elisabeth Messenger, Director; Acting Deputy Director, Andrew R. Davis
- Website: www.dol.gov/olms

The Office of Labor-Management Standards (OLMS) is an agency of the U.S. Department of Labor that promotes standards for democracy and fiscal responsibility in labor organizations. It was formed in 1959.

== Activities ==
OLMS administers and enforces most provisions of the Labor-Management Reporting and Disclosure Act of 1959 (LMRDA).The LMRDA was enacted primarily to ensure basic standards of democracy and fiscal responsibility in labor organizations which represent employees in private industry. Unions representing U.S. Postal Service employees became subject to the LMRDA with the passage of the Postal Reorganization Act of 1970.

OLMS also enforces standards on officers of unions representing U.S. government workers defined by the Civil Service Reform Act of 1978.

== History ==
The agency was originally formed as the Bureau of Labor-Management Reports in 1959. It was renamed the Labor-Management Services Administration in 1963, and the Office of Labor-Management Standards in 1984.
