= Shawn Morrison =

American television soap opera writer

Shawn Morrison is an American television soap opera writer. During the writers' strike of 2007-08, he chose financial core status with the Writers Guild of America and continued working.

== Positions held ==
Days of Our Lives

- Associate Head Writer (1995–1998)

Passions

- Script Editor (2007–2008)
- Outline Writer (2003–2007)
- Associate Head Writer (1999–2003)

== Awards and nominations ==
Daytime Emmy Award

- Nomination, 2003, Best Writing, Passions
- Nomination, 2002, Best Writing, Passions
- Nomination, 2001, Best Writing, Passions
- Nomination, 1998, Best Writing, Days of our Lives
- Nomination, 1997, Best Writing, Days of our Lives

Writers Guild of America Award

- Nomination, 2000, Best Writing, Passions
