= John Kuntz =

American dramatist

John Kuntz is an American actor, playwright, director, and solo performer. Kuntz is the author of 14 full-length plays, a founding company member at Actors' Shakespeare Project, has taught at Emerson College, Suffolk University, and Concord Academy, and is currently an associate professor of theater at the Boston Conservatory at Berklee. He was an inaugural playwriting fellow with the Huntington Theatre Company and a fellow at the Eugene O'Neill Theatre Center in 2007. Kuntz is the recipient of six Elliot Norton Awards, two Independent Reviewers of New England (IRNE) Awards, and New York International Fringe Festival Award, among others.

== Background ==
Kuntz earned a Bachelors in Arts in acting from Emerson College and a Masters of Arts in playwriting from Boston University, studying at Boston Playwrights' Theater.

== Plays ==
Kuntz is the author of 14 full-length plays, including The Superheroine Monologues (co-written with Rick Park), Sing Me to Sleep, Freaks, Starfuckers, After School Special, My Life with the Kringle Kult, Miss Price, The Hotel Nepenthe, Glitterati, Emerald City, Jasper Lake, Jump/Rope and Actorz with a Z, The Salt Girl, The Annotated History of the American Muskrat, and Necessary Monsters.

Kuntz has collaborated multiple times with director David R. Gammons; three times on his plays The Salt Girl, The Hotel Nepenthe, and Necessary Monsters, and as an actor on an all-male production of Titus Andronicus for Actors Shakespeare Project and The Whale with Speakeasy Stage. In an interview with Speakeasy Stage for the production of The Whale, Kuntz was asked what he thought the reason the writer/director team of Kuntz and Gammons works so well. He answered, "I think we love working together because we have so much in common: We're both about the same age. We're both gay. We both love The Smiths and candy and have really dark senses of humor. We get excited by similar stage aesthetics, but from very different perspectives: I'm primarily an actor/playwright, while David is a director as well as a very talented designer and visual artist. So we inspire each other from different angles."

== Acting career ==
As an actor, Kuntz has performed in New York at the Ohio Theatre, Urban Stages, and the New York Fringe Festival. In Boston, Kuntz has performed with Actors Shakespeare Project, American Repertory Theatre (ART), Apollinaire Theatre, Modern Theatre, Boston Playwrights Theatre, Company One, New Repertory Theatre, Nora Theatre Company, and Commonwealth Shakespeare.

Film credits include Roger in The Red Right Hand and Neil in Anathema.

== Professional Awards and Recognitions ==
- The SantaLand Diaries (IRNE Award: Best Solo Performance)
- Starfuckers (Elliott Norton Award, New York International Fringe Festival Award)
- Sing Me to Sleep and Freaks (Elliot Norton Award: Outstanding Fringe Production)
- Freaks (Elliot Norton Award: Outstanding Fringe Production)
- Jasper Lake (2005 Michael Kanin National Playwriting Award, 2005 Paula Vogel National Playwriting Award)
- The Salt Girl (2010 Elliot Norton Award: Best New Play)
- The Hotel Nepenthe (Elliot Norton Award: Best Ensemble; Elliot Norton: Best New Play; IRNE: Best New Play)
- Anathema (film: Festival Du Cinema du Bruxelles: Best Actor)
