= Roger Newman =

British-born American soap opera actor and writer (1940–2010)

- Born: Roger Stuart Newman; 31 August 1940; London, England
- Died: 4 March 2010 (aged 69); New York City, United States
- Citizenship: United States (naturalized 1968)
- Education: Columbia University
- Occupations: actor, writer
- Years active: c. 1945 – 2010
- Known for: Ken Norris on the Guiding Light and Passions
- Spouse: Fran Myers
- Awards: Daytime Emmy Award for Outstanding Drama Series Writing Team 1993 (member of writing team)

Roger Newman (31 August 1940 – 4 March 2010) was a British born-American soap opera actor and writer. He was born in London, and died in New York City.

Newman began his career as a child in radio. He moved with his family to Montréal after World War II, and he eventually settled in the United States. He served in the US Army and attended Columbia University.

His credits included Guiding Light, where he met his wife, the actor and writer Frances Myers. He also had a short role as Joe on The Edge of Night. He was a member of a team of writers who received an Emmy Award in 1993 for "The Guiding Light."

== Positions held ==
The Edge of Night

- Actor: 1967

Guiding Light

- Actor: April 20, 1970 – October 30, 1972; February 26, 1973 – April 25, 1975; September 1, 1998 – February 22, 1999
- Script Writer: 1992 – 1999

Another World

- Script Writer: 1983 – 1988

One Life to Live

- Script Writer: 1991 – 1992

Passions

- Script Writer: 1999 – 2004

== Awards and nominations ==
Daytime Emmy Awards

WINS

- (1993; Best Writing; Guiding Light)

NOMINATIONS

- (1985 & 1989; Best Writing; Another World)
- (1999; Best Writing; Guiding Light)
- (2001, 2002 & 2003; Best Writing; Passions)

Writers Guild of America Award

WINS

- (1993 season; One Life to Live)

NOMINATIONS

- (1995, 1996, 1998 & 1999 seasons; Guiding Light)
- (2001 seasons; Passions)
