= Jim Sayegh =

American television soap opera director

James Sayegh is an American television soap opera director.

== Directing Credits ==
One Life to Live

- Associate Director (1988–1995)
- Director (1996–1998)

Passions

- Director (entire run, 1999–2008)

The Young and the Restless

- Occasional Director (2008)

== Awards and nominations ==
Daytime Emmy Award

- Nomination, 2001, 2003–2004, Directing, Passions
- Nomination, 1988–1989, 1995, Directing, One Life to Live

Directors Guild of America Award

- Win, 1998, Directing, One Life to Live, (episode #7572)
- Nomination, 1993, Directing, One Life to Live, (episode #6356)
