= Marc Hertz =

American soap opera writer

Marc Hertz is an American soap opera writer.

== Positions held ==
The Young and the Restless

- Script Writer (October 16, 2003 - May 10, 2006)

== Awards and nominations ==
Daytime Emmy Awards WIN: 2006; Best Writing; Y&R NOMINATIONS: 2005 & 2006; Best Writing; Y&R Writers Guild of America Award WIN: 2005 season; Y&R
