= Millee Taggart =

American actress and writer

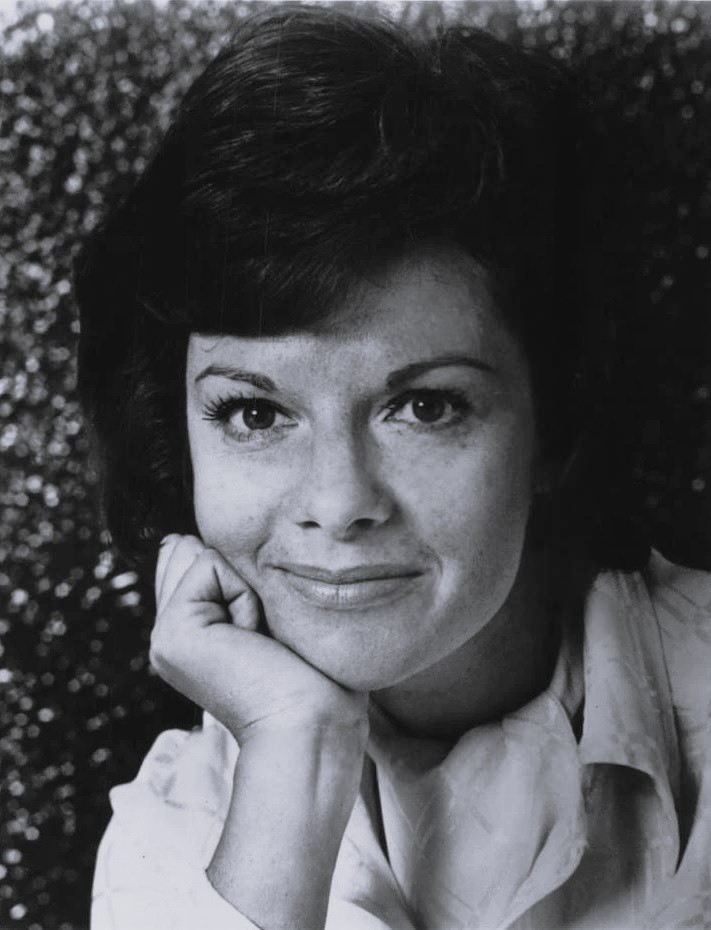
- Taggart in Search for Tomorrow (1980)
- Born: September 2, 1940 (age 85); Ottawa, Illinois, U.S.
- Occupations: Actress, writer, producer

Millee Taggart (born September 2, 1940, Ottawa, Illinois) is an American actress, writer, and producer. She is best known for her role as Janet Bergman Collins on Search for Tomorrow. She portrayed the character from 1971 to 1982. Her other acting roles on soaps include Gerry McGrath Pollock #3 on The Edge of Night and Millie Parks on One Life to Live.

She is also known for writing both comedic and dramatic series, which first started when the executives at Search for Tomorrow hired her as a writer in 1980 using the name Lenny Carr, while she was still playing the role of Janet. Around the same time she wrote for The Doctors under the pseudonym Heather Matthews. From there, she wrote sitcoms such as The New Odd Couple and Joanie Loves Chachi. She was co-creator and Co-Executive Producer of The Thornes, which starred Tony Roberts, who had played her husband, Lee Pollock, in the 1960s on the soap opera The Edge of Night (in which played Gerry McGrath Pollock).

She briefly wrote for Santa Barbara in 1984. She then joined As the World Turns from 1984 - 1985. She served as head writer of Ryan's Hope from 1985 - 1987. She later served on the All My Children writing team from 1996 - 1997. Her most famous writing achievements have been a three-year stint on Loving from 1988–1991 and a recent stint for Guiding Light from 2002 - 2003.

Taggart was a co-executive producer of the reality TV series, Starting Over. She is also sometimes credited as Millee Taggart-Ratcliffe.

Taggart and novelist Barbara Taylor Bradford wrote a "bible" for a new daytime serial which was titled, Saints And Sinners. Ms Taggart-Ratcliffe is currently Co-Executive Producer of Emmy Award winning series, Born This Way, on A&E.

== Positions held ==
All My Children

- Co-head writer: September 30, 1996 – January 17, 1997

As the World Turns

- Head Writer: April 24 – November 9, 1984

The City

- Writer: 1995–1996

Guiding Light

- Co-Head Writer: June 6 – November 28, 1994, November 18, 2002 – September 12, 2003

Loving

- Script writer: June 27, 1995, July 10-November 10, 1995
- Head writer: September 1, 1988 – August 2, 1991, January 18 – September 17, 1993

Ryan's Hope

- Head writer: February 18, 1985 – January 30, 1987

Santa Barbara

- Writer: 1980s

Search for Tomorrow

- Writer: 1980–1981

Starting Over

- Executive Producer: 2004–2006

== Awards and nominations ==
Daytime Emmy Awards

WINS

- (1997; Best Writing; All My Children)
- (2005; Outstanding Special Class Series; Starting Over)

NOMINATIONS

- (2003; Best Writing; Guiding Light)
- (2006 & 2007; Outstanding Special Class Series; Starting Over)

Writers Guild of America Award

WINS

- (1987 season; Ryan's Hope)
- (1994 season; Loving)
- (1997 season; All My Children)

NOMINATIONS

- (1993 season; Santa Barbara)
- (1995 & 2003 seasons; Guiding Light)
- (1998 season; All My Children)
