= Marlene Clark Poulter =

American television soap opera writer

Marlene Clark Poulter McPherson is an American television soap opera writer. McPherson, formerly a member of Writers Guild of America West, left and maintained financial core status during the 2007–08 Writers Guild of America strike.

== Positions held ==
All My Children

- Co-head writer: April 29, 2013 – September 2, 2013

Days of Our Lives

- Co head writer: August 26, 2011 – August 16, 2012
- Associate head writer: 1993 - 1999
- Script writer: 1991 - 1993

General Hospital

- Script continuity (1989)

Passions

- Associate head writer: 1999 - August 7, 2008

Swiss Family Robinson

- Co-creator/writer 2009

== Awards and nominations ==
Daytime Emmy Award

- Win, 2012 (for 2011 season), Best Writing, Days of Our Lives
- Nomination, 2001–2003, Best Writing, Passions
- Nomination, 1994, 1997–1999, Best Writing, Days of our Lives

Writers Guild of America Award

- Nomination, 2000, Best Writing, Passions
- Win, 1999, Best Writing, Days of our Lives
- Nomination, 1991, 1993, Best Writing, Days of our Lives

Preceded by Dena Higley	head writer of Days of Our Lives (with Darrell Ray Thomas, Jr.); August 26, 2011 - August 16, 2012	Succeeded by Gary Tomlin; Christopher Whitesell
Preceded by Lorraine Broderick	head writer of All My Children (with Elizabeth Snyder); April 29, 2013 - September 2, 2013	Succeeded by Show cancelled
