= Financial core =

Type of labor union membership

Financial core (also known as ficore or fi-core) refers to a legal carve-out that permits workers opposed to participating in a labor union to be employed under the benefits of a union's contracts without compelling them to be a member of that union.

The term "financial core" was first used in the 1963 United States Supreme Court decision National Labor Relations Board v. General Motors. The court determined that while workers cannot be compelled to be a union "member" as a condition of employment, they would be compelled to pay their share of a union's collective bargaining activities. The court referred to these collective bargaining costs as a union's financial core.

The worker who chooses financial core status is not a union member, cannot run or vote in union elections, and is referred to by the National Labor Relations Board (NLRB) as an "objector" or "union objector".

The court's decision requiring all workers in a union facility or profession to pay toward collective bargaining costs stemmed from its determination that all workers employed in a union environment—even those opposed to being union members—benefit from the union's collective bargaining which improves wages, working conditions, safety, and protections.

While union members pay "dues" toward collective bargaining, the decision required workers who elect financial core status pay an equal amount to the union which the court referred to as "fees". Twenty-five years later, in 1988, a subsequent Supreme Court decision allowed FiCore workers a slight reduction in fees if they opted out of the portion of fees paid toward union organizing and lobbying. This optional fee reduction is known as Beck Rights.

Labor unions list the number of objectors who refuse union membership as "fee paying non members" or an "agency fee payers" in the union's annual Office of Labor-Management Standards, LM-2 filing. On the job, objectors are often referred to as financial core workers, or ficore workers. Union slang refers to ficore workers as "scabs" since they work outside the union's membership rules and refuse to stand in solidarity with their coworkers.

While the financial core ruling came out of General Motors's (GM) dispute with the United Auto Workers (UAW), this Supreme Court ruling applies to all unions in the United States.

Although GM sought to undermine the UAW, the court's ruling that collective bargaining led to better working conditions for all workers was a win for unions. The court's carve-out for financial core status has had a limited effect on unions in most cases.

The exception is the entertainment unions with contracts in the film, television, and television commercial industry, which in some cases have been negatively affected. Ficore status allows fee paying non-members to circumvent entertainment union rules that require members only accept work under union contracts. Since ficore workers are not bound by union regulations and rules, they can accept work from non-union employers outside union contracts.

== Origin ==
The Supreme Court's 1963 financial core decision was one chapter in a series of ongoing corporate challenges to discount and even break Labor Unions since the 1930s rise of workers' rights in the labor movement.

Specifically, the case grew out of General Motors Corporation's (GM) refusal to recognize and negotiate with the United Auto Workers (UAW) in Indiana.

GM claimed it would not recognize the UAW since its opinion was the union was violating labor law by compelling workers to join the UAW as a condition of employment with GM.

GM's argument followed several states including Indiana's emerging right-to-work laws which said workers could not be compelled to join a union and pay union dues. The motivation was seen by legal observers as a bid to limit and even eliminate unions and collective bargaining.

GM's bid to weaken the UAW was largely unsuccessful. Even with the court's ficore carve out, as of December 2020 a mere .24% of workers affiliated with the UAW have elected FiCore status.

The fees paid by ficore workers are equal to the amount a union member pays in initiation fees and ongoing dues, but in keeping with the anti-union stance of the non-member, the payments are called "agency fees" as opposed to "member dues". In subsequent years, ongoing challenges to unions before the Supreme Court resulted in an optional and slight reductions to agency fees when compared to member dues in some cases. This optional reduction is dues are known as Beck Rights.

The financial core agency fees amount to the non-member's portion of the actual costs to staff and manage union operations including contract negotiations that protect workers interests and improve the working conditions.

Ficore surrender their union membership and card, cannot claim to be a union member, cannot run or vote for union office, cannot vote on contracts, and are not subject to any rules regulations set forth by the union.

== Beck rights, fee reduction for union political and organizing activities ==
Since the 1963 Supreme Court decision, corporations continue to work to weaken and eliminate unions and issues surrounding the Financial Core ruling continue to be litigated.

In 1988, the Supreme Court again addressed the financial core issue in Communications Workers of America v. Beck. The question this time was whether an employee who is ficore and not a union member can be required to pay a fee equal to full union dues if a portion of those fees are used for purposes beyond collective bargaining: contract negotiations, contract administration, grievance adjustment, and the like. The court ruled in a 5 to 3 decision, with Justice William Brennan writing for the majority, that the financial core obligation does not include "the obligation to support union activities beyond those germane to collective bargaining, contract administration, and grievance adjustment."

These adjustments are commonly known as "Beck rights". This additional carve out to the financial core ruling determined workers can opt out of paying toward union spending on "non-representational" activities. In most unions a so-called "Beck objector" is required to claim financial core status before that worker can benefit from the fee reduction offered by Beck rights.

This ruling grew out of a complaint by ficore employee Harry Beck, who protested the Communication Workers of America's support of 1968 Democratic presidential candidate Hubert Humphrey. Beck and a few additional ficore workers who joined him wanted refunds of the portion of their agency fees that went to supporting the Democrat, because Humphrey was a gun control supporter.

Beck rights state the ficore worker cannot be required to pay toward a union's support of non-representational activities such as contributions to political candidates, political agendas, political lobbying, and money spent on union organizing endeavors. Since unions have decades of history supporting Democratic candidates and agendas, the 1988 decision has been seen as a slight win for often Republican-leaning corporate interests. The discount in fees for these non-representational activities is minimal since unions generally only spend between 1–4% of their budget for political activities and organizing.

More recently, agency fees have been litigated as "fair share fees".

== Non membership ==
The process to claim ficore status requires the worker to first meet the threshold for joining a specific union, join that union paying all initiation fees, then notifying that union they will be withdrawing and surrendering their union card in favor of electing financial core status.

Since ficore workers have chosen to quit the union, union workers often use negative slang terms to refer to ficore. The most common slang term for ficore historically is "scab". Ficore workers are generally seen by union members as siding with management and corporate interests instead of supporting the employees they work beside and the union that represents and protects them.

Controversy continues as to the definition of financial core and the impact it has in the workplace.

Under the National Labor Relations Act (Sec. 8(a)(3)) an employer and a labor organization may agree to condition employment upon membership in the union. The 1963 ruling limited the burdens of membership upon which employment may be conditioned to the payment of initiation fees and monthly dues. In the words of the court, "Membership as a condition of employment is whittled down to its financial core." Or, in other words, "If an employee in a union shop unit refuses to respect any union-imposed obligations other than the duty to pay dues and fees, and membership in the union is therefore denied or terminated, the condition of membership for 8(a)(3) purposes is nevertheless satisfied and the employee may not be discharged for nonmembership even though he is not a formal member."

== Impact ==
In every private sector union the percentage of workers who elect financial core status is minimal.

The workers who do elect ficore status cannot run for union elected office, cannot vote in union elections, cannot claim to be union members, and are not entitled to member perks that vary depending on the industry. Ficore are entitled to the same wages and benefits as union workers in a union workplace. Finally, the ficore worker cannot be held accountable to any union guidelines, rules, and regulations since they are no longer union members. Being a worker who operates outside union rules has greater impact in some industries than in others.

== Entertainment industry unions ==
A unique impact of the ficore ruling can be seen in the entertainment industry unions including the American professional actors' union, SAG-AFTRA, professional writers' union Writers Guild of America (WGA), and the professional film directors union Directors Guild of America (DGA). The entertainment industry in film, television and other media platforms is largely composed of unionized gig workers. Entertainment Union workers pledge to only work for union productions. In essence, the unions have created a virtual strike line around productions refusing to honor union contracts.

However, the Supreme Court's ruling allows union-eligible workers to declare as fee paying non-members or ficore, allowing them to cross the virtual strike line and work in both union and non-union productions, weakening the collective bargaining power of the unions.

SAG-AFTRA members, for example, agree to adhere to Global Rule One which states, "No member shall render any services or make an agreement to perform services for any employer who has not executed a basic minimum agreement with the union, which is in full force and effect, in any jurisdiction in which there is a SAG-AFTRA national collective bargaining agreement in place. This provision applies worldwide." Simply put, a SAG-AFTRA member must always work under a union contract around the globe. The FiCore, viewed as anti-union or "scabs" by the union, makes a choice not to honor this pledge.

Occasions when an entertainment union worker does not quit that union via FiCore, but crosses the virtual strike line to accept work in a non-union project, is referred to as working "off the card". Unions take disciplinary action against members if they are found to be working off the card. However, workers who have claimed ficore status are not subject to any union disciplinary action, and cannot be prohibited from accepting work in non-union productions.

Despite the heavy union busting push by some production companies and brands, only a small percentage of talent union members choose to leave their unions to claim ficore status. The most recent numbers available show performers affiliated with SAG-AFTRA (4/30/2025) who choose ficore status is 3.06%,

Directors affiliated with the DGA (12/31/2020) who choose ficore status is 1.29% and Writers affiliated with the WGA East (3/31/2021) is 0.2% and WGA West (3/31/2021) is 0.15%.

=== SAG-AFTRA ===
In recent years some ad agencies and brands that produce TV commercials have opposed the professional performers' union, SAG-AFTRA, in an effort to pay less than union contracts provide.

Professional talent agents representing performers in commercials in Los Angeles claim SAG-AFTRA has lost ground in what was a 90% union foothold in 1999 to a mere 50% and possibly only 30% of commercials produced under union contracts in 2020. Those numbers are estimates since SAG-AFTRA does not publicly release commercial production figures and non-union production figures are not compiled.

SAG-AFTRA does report the number of Financial Core union objectors in an annual filing to the Labor Department. In the last decade, annual FiCore withdrawals have grown steadily with a few hundred members leaving the union each year. 2025 marks the highest number of FiCore withdrawals at 373 bringing the total to 5,484 union objectors.

When compared to the 179,119 active members in 2025, the number of FiCore withdrawals represents a number equal to 3.06% of those who are card carrying union members. 3.06% is by far the highest percentage of union objectors in any of the American entertainment unions.

The efforts by advertisers and ad agencies aim to produce non-union commercials at less expense by paying performers less than union minimums. SAG-AFTRA commercials contract sets minimum day rates, reuse rates, and provides protections, and benefits through mutual bargaining with the Joint Policy Committee (JPC). The JPC represents advertisers and ad agencies, as their collective bargaining trade association in negotiations with SAG-AFTRA.

Non-union commercial productions are produced outside the JPC's collectively-bargained union agreements. Non-union shoots for performers in some platforms pay as little as nothing, instead offering the performer "exposure". Non-union commercials may also pay a one-time buyout to performers who waive their personality rights. Personality rights provide a person control over commercial use of their identity, name, likeness, and image.

When performers join SAG-AFTRA they take a pledge not to perform in any non-union projects within the union's jurisdiction. Workers who cross this de facto strike line are referred to as "union busters" or "scabs". Performers who object to working only under union contracts can claim ficore status and avoid any union membership and its ramifications. This option allows performers to circumvent any SAG-AFTRA obligations, rules, guidelines, and discipline including union actors' pledge to refuse to work non-union jobs.

Most unions, including SAG-AFTRA, frown on the ficore choice as it reduces unions' power in collectively bargaining by undermining the unions solidarity and strength.

The non-union, anti-SAG-AFTRA commercial route comes with downsides for most performers. Non-union TV commercials offer a much lower one-time payment. The SAG-AFTRA contract offer compensation and reuse payments to the performer as the spot runs.

Every state recognizes personality rights, which regard a person's name, likeness and image as their property. As such, SAG-AFTRA contracts require ongoing payments whenever a performer's image airs in a TV spot or streams in other media. The payment schedule, known as residuals, is spelled out in the union contract where professional performers are paid per use or for blocks of use of their image and performance.

Ficore workers in non-union commercials do not receive residuals, and often face the ire of union members who consider ficore union objectors as union busters and scabs.

As ad agencies hire talent through talent agencies, union busting tactics needed to be set up between ad agencies, talent agencies, and professional actors willing to work for less compensation.

Since the professional performers union was founded in the 1930s, the actors' union (at that time, the Screen Actors Guild) had a collectively bargained franchise agreement with the Association of Talent Agents (ATA) who represented most Film, Television, and similar media union performers. The franchise agreement, known as "Rule 16(g)", prohibited agents from taking commissions in excess of 10% and strictly regulated talent agents' fiduciary duties to their union clients.

In 2002, however, negotiations between then-SAG and the ATA broke down and the Rule 16(g) contract between the two expired. Without union regulations, talent agents have been able to build significant anti-SAG-AFTRA performer rosters with Ficore and non-union performers. When booking their nonunion clients, talent agents can keep more of the money paid toward the performers' performance via much higher non-union commissions and non-union fees talent agents collect. The larger non-union commissions and fees is seen by observers to be a motivation for Talent agents to grow departments representing ficore actors. Although the actor earns much less, talent agents generally take 40% of the money budgeted for the actors' performance in the nonunion commercial arena.

Offering ficore actors to ad agencies and brands for much lower wages and much higher talent agency commissions than performers working union contracts was not permitted under Rule 16(g).

While Rule 16g expired, some talent agents are catalogued by SAG-AFTRA as so-called "Franchised Talent Agents." To be listed on the current Franchised Talent Agent roster at SAG-AFTRA , Talent Agents agree to a largely-unenforcible pledge to honor the wishes of SAG-AFTRA.

For example, under the standard SAG-AFTRA contract, talent agents are not permitted to take more than 10% commissions from any performers. But where a performer is ficore and not represented by the union, talent agents are free to collect 20% commissions, the maximum allowed by California labor law.

In most cases that 20% commission is doubled, allowing talent agents to receive 40% of the money budgeted for the actor's performance. To achieve this, the brand or ad agency parses out the money budgeted for the actors' performance by taking 20% off the top and forwarding that directly to the talent agent, calling it a "agent fee". The talent agent then grabs the second 20% as a commission from the money sent to the actor as wages. These two 20% payments are known in the industry as "double-dipping".

These outsized commissions and fees are seen to incentivize some talent agents to encourage their clients to choose non-union work. Some of the top talent agencies representing commercial talent began to either accept or encourage their SAG-AFTRA clients to take ficore status, fostering a growth in non-union TV commercials.

Some non-union performers have pushed back against double-dipping talent agents, filing charges with the California Department of Industrial Relations where the 40% commission has been found to be a violation of California Labor Code. Since Labor Code limits agent commissions to 20%, some actors filing charges have received restitution and monetary penalties from offending talent agents. In the nonunion arena, however, ficore performers do not have access to the union's contract enforcement or the union's legal team, meaning all attorney costs and legal fees are their own responsibility. Whatever the reason, few ficore and non-union actors protest the often illegal 40% commissions.

With these downsides for performers, most professional performers stick with the union for fair wages, benefits, and protections that go with it. As of SAG-AFTRA's 2023 filing with the Office of Labor Management, the union's active membership was 175,747. At that time, 4,802 performers had opted out of the union through ficore status. Combining those two figures adds up to a total number of performers affiliated with SAG-AFTRA at 180,549. Of workers affiliated with SAG-AFTRA, 2.65% of the total have elected ficore status.

In recent years, SAG-AFTRA has stepped up its educational campaign to share the upside of union work and the pitfalls of working in commercials without union protections. Part of the educational outreach was the launch of the Ads Go Union campaign that visits improv comedy houses and non-union commercial sets.

A grassroots group of SAG-AFTRA performers calling themselves Union Working—many members recognizable from union TV campaigns—banded together to educate performers on the drawbacks of ficore non-union ads. Union Working has produced videos highlighting the advantages and importance of union work and the downside of ficore. The videos have included some high-profile SAG-AFTRA members. Some of the pro union videos include SAG-AFTRA members; Jon Hamm, Allison Janney, J.K. Simmons, Eric Stonestreet, George Lopez, Marion Ross, Nick Offerman, Mindy Sterling, Zoey Deutch, Mayim Bialik, Dermot Mulroney, and more.

=== WGA ===
The Writers Guild of America takes an aggressive stance against writers who choose financial core status.

At one time, then-WGA West president Patric Verrone and his then-WGA East counterpart, Michael Winship, put out a joint statement naming members who chose to break solidarity by claiming financial core status as writers "who consciously and selfishly decided to place their own narrow interests over the greater good."

=== The Animation Guild ===
Financial core became a problem for The Animation Guild during the 1982 animators' strike when several members changed to financial core status during the strike, which allowed them to go back to work and undercut the strike.
