= Peggy Schibi =

Peggy Schibi (also known as Peggi Schibi) is an American television soap opera script writer.

== Positions held ==
Another World

- Script Writer: 1987–1988

Days of Our Lives

- Script Editor: February 1997 – February 1999
- Script Writer: October 1986 – January 1987, September 1993 – February 1997

General Hospital

- Script Writer: 1983–1984, 1989

Guiding Light

- Script Writer: 1991–1993

Passions

- Script Writer: 1999–2007

== Awards and nominations ==
Daytime Emmy Awards

WINS

- (1993; Best Writing; Guiding Light)

NOMINATIONS

- (1984; Best Writing; General Hospital)
- (1992; Best Writing; Guiding Light)
- (1994, 1997, 1998, and 1999; Best Writing; Days of Our Lives)
- (2001, 2002, and 2003; Best Writing; Passions)

Writers Guild of America Award

WINS

- (2000 season; Days of Our Lives)

NOMINATIONS

- (1988 and 1994 seasons; Days of Our Lives)
- (2001 season; Passions)
