= Frederick Johnson (writer) =

American writer

Frederick Johnson is an American writer known for his work on television soap operas. He has won five Emmy Awards and five Writers Guild of America Awards. He is an alumnus of Cornell University.

== Positions held ==
All My Children

- Associate Head Writer (1993 - 1998: hired by Agnes Nixon & Megan McTavish; 1999 - 2003: hired by Agnes Nixon)

As the World Turns (hired by Hogan Sheffer)

- Associate Head Writer (2004 - 2005)

The Bold and the Beautiful

- Script Writer (1989; 2006 - 2006: hired by William J. Bell & Bradley Bell)
- Story Consultant (1988–1989; hired by William J. Bell)

Days of Our Lives

- Associate Head Writer (2006 - 2008: hired by Hogan Sheffer)

Guiding Light (hired by James Harmon Brown & Barbara Esensten)

- Associate Head Writer (1998–1999)

One Life to Live (hired by Frank Valentini & Brian Frons)

- Associate Head Writer (2008 - 2010)

The Young and the Restless

- Script Writer (1989–1993)
- Story Consultant (1988–1989: hired by William J. Bell)

== Awards and nominations ==
Emmy Awards

NOMINATION

- (2005 & 2006; Best Writing; As The World Turns)
- (1995, 1996, 1997, 1998, 1999, 2001–2004; Best Writing; All My Children)
- (1999; Best Writing; Guiding Light)
- (1992 & 1993; Best Writing; Y&R)

WIN

- (2005; Best Writing; As The World Turns)
- (1996, 1997, 1998; Best Writing; All My Children)
- (1992; Best Writing; The Young And The Restless)

Writers Guild of America Award

NOMINATION

- (2009, 2010 seasons; One Life to Live)
- (2005 season; As The World Turns)
- (1995, 1996, 1997, 1998, 1999, 2000, 2001 & 2003 seasons; All My Children)
- (1998 season; Guiding Light)

WIN

- (1996, 1998, 2000, 2001, 2003 season; All My Children)
