= Jerry Birn =

American television soap opera writer

Jerry Birn (1923 – December 5, 2009) was an American television soap opera writer. He was married to actress Patty Weaver from 1994 until his death aged 86; his daughter is Laura Bryan Birn.

Both his wife and his daughter appeared on The Young and the Restless. Birn's wife portrayed Gina Roma from 1982 to 2006 (with additional guest appearances afterwards) and his daughter Laura Bryan Birn played Lynne Bassett from 1988 to 2004.

== Positions held ==
Jerry Birn was the former writer and consultant for "The Bold and the Beautiful" and "The Young and the Restless."

The Bold and the Beautiful

- Story Consultant (September 2004 - January 9, 2008; April 2008 - 2009)

The Young and the Restless (Hired by William J. Bell)

- Breakdown Writer (1993 - August 5, 2004)
- Script Writer (1989–1993)

== Awards and nominations ==
Daytime Emmy Award

- 12 Nominations: 2006, Best Writing, The Bold And The Beautiful; 1990–1991, 1993–1995, 1998–1999, 2001, 2003–2005, Best Writing, The Young And The Restless
- 3 Wins: 1992, 1997 and 2000, Best Writing, The Young And The Restless

Writers Guild of America Award

- 1 Win: 2002 season, The Young And The Restless
- 2 Nominations: 1999 and 2001 season, The Young And The Restless
