= Ethel Brez =

American television soap opera writer (1937–2021)

Ethel Brez (August 12, 1937 – August 25, 2021) was an American television soap opera writer.

== Positions held ==
Another World (hired by Harding Lemay)

- Script Writer (1974)

Days of Our Lives

- Associate Head Writer (1993–1994)

One Life to Live

- Associate Head Writer (1985–1992)

Passions (hired by James E. Reilly)

- Associate Head Writer (1999–2002)

Search for Tomorrow

- Script Writer (1982–1984)

== Awards and nominations ==
Daytime Emmy Award

- Nomination, 2002, Best Writing, Passions
- Nomination, 2001, Best Writing, Passions
- Nomination, 1994, Best Writing, Days of our Lives
- Nomination, 1992, Best Writing, One Life to Live
- Nomination, 1990, Best Writing, One Life to Live
- Win, 1987, Best Writing, One Life to Live

Writers Guild of America Award

- Nomination, 2000, Best Writing, Passions
- Nomination, 1993, Best Writing, Days of our Lives
- Nomination, 1986, Best Writing, One Life to Live
- Win, 1985, Best Writing, One Life to Live
