= Maralyn Thoma =

American television soap opera writer

Maralyn Thoma is an American television soap opera writer.

== Early life ==
Thoma was born in Memphis, Tennessee and was raised in Houston, Texas. At age 15 she moved to Las Vegas and became a chorus girl at the Sahara Hotel. A year later, she returned to Houston to finish school and worked as one of eight summer stock theatre dancers. She pursued a dancer career in New York where she worked for 10 years performing in 5 Broadway shows. She relocated to Los Angeles along with her two children assuming that California is better for her and them.

== Career ==
In 1980, Thoma became a secretary for Columbia Pictures. A year later, she was hired as the secretary to the head writer of General Hospital. Eventually, she became a writer for the show, earning 30 million viewers. Her favorite writing was for the episode where General Hospital's Anna fell in love with a man from another planet. While she was a writer for the show, she also did writing for the Days of Our Lives and Emmy-winning Santa Barbara before moving to James E. Reilly as a screenwriter for Passions in 1999.

In 1995, Thoma moved to Bend, Oregon where she founded 2nd Street Theater. In 2008, she produced Helen on Wheels. In that play, she played the lead role of Helen Wheeler, an old, drunk, and armed lady. In 2009, she was a co-host of Bend Follies, a comedy play which raised money for the Tower Theatre Foundation.

== Positions held ==
Days of Our Lives

- Breakdown writer: 1983 - 1985 (hired by Margaret DePriest)
- Script writer: 1993 - 1999

General Hospital

- Script writer: 1985-1988 (hired by Pat Falken Smith)
- Associate head writer: 1989 - 1990
- Head writer: 1992 - 1993

Santa Barbara

- Associate head writer: 1991 - 1992
- Head writer: 1990 - 1991

Man from Atlantis

- Actress

== Awards and nominations ==
Daytime Emmy Award: Her first nomination in 1984 was shared with Margaret DePriest, Sheri Anderson, Michael Robert David, Susan Goldberg, Bob Hansen, Leah Markus, and Dana Soloff.

- Won, 1990, Best Writing,"Santa Barbara"
- Won, 1991, Best Writing, "Santa Barbara"
- Nomination, 2003, Best Writing, Passions
- Nomination, 2002, Best Writing, Passions
- Nomination, 2001, Best Writing, Passions
- Nomination, 1999, Best Writing, Days of our Lives
- Nomination, 1998, Best Writing, Days of our Lives
- Nomination, 1997, Best Writing, Days of our Lives
- Nomination, 1994, Best Writing, Days of our Lives

Writers Guild of America Awards

- Won 1990, Best Writing, "Santa Barbara" *
- Won, 1991, Best Writing, "Santa Barbara"
- Nomination, 2000, Best Writing, Passions
- Won, 1999, Best Writing, Days of our Lives
- Nomination, 1993, Best Writing, Days of our Lives
- Nomination, 1987, Best Writing, Days of our Lives
