= Peter Brinckerhoff =

American television director

Peter Andrew Brinckerhoff (born around 1948), also stylized as Peter Brinkerhoff, is an American television director who primarily directed soap operas. Brinckerhoff received six Daytime Emmy Award nominations and won once in 1991 for co-directing Santa Barbara. His other notable credits include Sunset Beach, Spyder Games, Passions, General Hospital, and The Young and the Restless.

== Positions held ==
Another World

- Director (1989)

As the World Turns

- Director (1983)

Capitol

- Director (1984)

Passions

- Director (entire run, 1999–2008)

Santa Barbara

- Director (1991–1993)

Search for Tomorrow

- Stage Manager (1980)

Spyder Games

- Director (entire run, 2001)

Sunset Beach

- Director (entire run, 1997–1999)

General Hospital

- Director (1993–2009)

General Hospital: Night Shift

- Director (all eps of season two)

Days of Our Lives

- Director (December 23, 2008–present)

The Young and the Restless

- Director (May 5, 2009–present)

== Awards and nominations ==
Daytime Emmy Award

- Nomination, 2004, Directing, Passions
- Nomination, 2003, Directing, Passions
- Nomination, 2002, Special Class Directing, Spyder Games
- Nomination, 2001, Directing, Passions
- Nomination, 2000, Directing, Sunset Beach
- Win, 1991, Directing, Santa Barbara
