= Mel Brez =

American television soap opera writer (1936–2020)

Mel Brez (September 19, 1936 – November 18, 2020) was an American television soap opera writer.

== Positions held ==
The Doctors

- Head Writer: October 3, 1977 - April 10, 1978 (with Ethel Brez)

Another World

- Script Writer: 1974, 1995

As the World Turns

- Co-Head Writer: 1997
- Associate Head Writer: 1997, 1998

Days of Our Lives

- Associate Head Writer: 1993 - 1994

One Life to Live

- Associate Head Writer: 1985 - 1992

Passions

- Associate Head Writer: 1999 - 2002

== Awards and nominations ==
Daytime Emmy Award

- Nomination, 2002, Best Writing, Passions
- Nomination, 2001, Best Writing, Passions
- Nomination, 1994, Best Writing, Days of our Lives
- Nomination, 1992, Best Writing, One Life to Live
- Nomination, 1990, Best Writing, One Life to Live
- Win, 1987, Best Writing, One Life to Live

Writers Guild of America Award

- Nomination, 2000, Best Writing, Passions
- Nomination, 1998, Best Writing, As the World Turns
- Nomination, 1997, Best Writing, As the World Turns
- Nomination, 1993, Best Writing, Days of our Lives
- Nomination, 1986, Best Writing, One Life to Live
- Win, 1985, Best Writing, One Life to Live

== Death ==
Brez died on 18 November 2020 at the age of 84.
