= Grant A. Johnson =

American television soap opera director

Grant A. Johnson is an American television soap opera director.

== Positions held ==
Days of Our Lives

- Director (2007–Present)

General Hospital

- Director (January 15, 2004 - November 16, 2004)

Passions

- Director (2000–2003)

Santa Barbara

- Associate Director (1989–1993)
- Production Assistant

Sunset Beach

- Director (1998–1999)
- Offline Editor (1998)
- Associate Director (1997)

The Young and the Restless

- Occasional Director (2008, 2009)
- Production Associate (1986–1988)

== Awards and nominations ==
Daytime Emmy Award

- Win, 2018, Directing, Days of Our Lives
- Win, 2005, Directing, General Hospital
- Win, 1999, Editing, Sunset Beach
- Nomination, 2001, 2003, 2004, Directing, Passions
- Nomination, 2000, Directing, Sunset Beach
