= N. Gail Lawrence =

American television soap opera writer

N. Gail Lawrence (also known as Gail Lawrence) is an American television soap opera writer.

== Positions held ==
All My Children (hired by Megan McTavish)

- Associate Head Writer: 1994 - 1996, 1998–2001, 2013

Days of Our Lives

- Writer: 1993

General Hospital

- Script Writer: 1993

Guiding Light

- Associate Head Writer: 1996 - 1998
- Script Writer: 1984 - 1993

Passions (hired by James E. Reilly)

- Associate Head Writer: 2001 - 2007

Santa Barbara

- Script Writer: 1993

== Awards and nominations ==
Daytime Emmy Awards

WINS

- (1986, 1990 & 1993; Best Writing; Guiding Light)
- (1996; Best Writing; All My Children)

NOMINATIONS

- (1985, 1989, 1992 & 1999; Best Writing; Guiding Light)
- (1995, 1999, 2001 & 2002; Best Writing; All My Children)
- (2003; Best Writing; Passions)

Writers Guild of America Award

WINS

- (1992 season; Guiding Light)
- (1999, 2001 & 2002 seasons; All My Children)

NOMINATIONS

- (1985, 1986, 1989, 1998 & 1999 seasons; Guiding Light)
- (1994 season; Days of Our Lives)
- (1996 & 2000 seasons; All My Children)
