= Pete T. Rich =

American soap opera script writer

Pete T. Rich is an American television soap opera script writer. Rich, formerly a member of Writers Guild of America, East, left and maintained financial core status during the 2007–08 Writers Guild of America strike.

== Positions held ==
All My Children

- Script Writer: 1994 - 1995

Days of Our Lives

- Script Writer: 1993, 2011 – 2012

Guiding Light

- Script Writer: 1984 - 1993, 1997–1999

Passions

- Script Writer: 1999 - 2008

Santa Barbara

- Script Writer: 1993

== Awards and nominations ==
Daytime Emmy Awards

WINS

- (1986, 1990 & 1993; Best Writing; Guiding Light)
- (1996; Best Writing; All My Children)
- (2004; Best Original Song; Passions)
- (2012; Best Writing; Days of Our Lives)

NOMINATIONS

- (1985, 1989, 1992 & 1999; Best Writing; Guiding Light)
- (1995; Best Writing; All My Children)
- (2001, 2002 & 2003; Best Writing; Passions)

Writers Guild of America Award

WINS

- (1992 season; Guiding Light)
- (2014 season; Days of Our Lives)

NOMINATIONS

- (1985, 1986, 1989, 1998 & 1999 seasons; Guiding Light)
- (1994 season; Days of Our Lives)
- (1996 season; All My Children)
- (2001 season; Passions)
