= James E. Reilly =

American screenwriter

- Born: July 15, 1948; Bountiful, Utah, United States
- Died: October 12, 2008 (aged 60)
- Occupation: Television writer

James E. Reilly (July 15, 1948 – October 12, 2008) was an American soap opera writer. He was the head writer of NBC's Days of Our Lives and creator/head writer of Passions. Reilly won a Daytime Emmy Award for Outstanding Drama Series Writing as co-head writer for Guiding Light in 1993.

Reilly died in October 2008 while recovering from cardiac surgery.

== Career ==
Reilly created the NBC Daytime soap opera Passions in 1999, and served as the series' head writer until its cancellation in 2008. He was previously the co-head writer of Guiding Light from 1990 to 1992 and Days of our Lives from 1992 to 1997. Reilly also worked as a staff writer for other daytime dramas prior to that, including The Young and the Restless and General Hospital.

Though Passions was historically top-rated in key demographics, the series was plagued since its inception by low overall Nielsen ratings and the final episode aired on August 7, 2008.

During his run on Passions, Reilly returned to Days of our Lives as head writer from August 18, 2003 until August 9, 2006, and was succeeded by former As the World Turns head writer Hogan Sheffer.

Reilly was one of 20 writers who chose financial core status with the Writers Guild of America during the 2007–2008 Writers Guild of America strike; after the strike, the WGA wrote a letter releasing the names of these individuals, inviting accusations of blacklisting.

James E. Reilly had a triple major in psychology, social anthropology and biology.

=== Departure from traditional stories ===
In 1993, Reilly gained attention immediately after taking over as head writer on Days of our Lives for a storyline in which heroine Carly Manning (Crystal Chappell) is buried alive by villainess Vivian Alamain (Louise Sorel) for weeks, and taunted through speakers. Reilly began what is arguably his most infamous storyline in 1995 when the show's central heroine, Marlena Evans (Deidre Hall), becomes possessed by Satan. The storyline played out for a year, with Marlena's lover finally exorcising the demon, but not before garnering the show increased ratings — despite frequent interruptions by the O.J. Simpson murder trial going on at the time, and the criticism of longtime fans upset by "liberties" Reilly took with the characters and continuity. Finally, in 1996 Reilly gave Eileen Davidson, who had played Kristen Blake since 1993, a second role as Kristen's lookalike Susan Banks, and between 1997 and 1998 added three more — including a man — with Davidson ultimately receiving a Daytime Emmy nomination for Outstanding Lead Actress in 1998.

Reilly left Days of our Lives in 1997 and created Passions in 1999, freed of a pre-existing fan base to please. The series featured veteran actress Juliet Mills as Tabitha Lenox, a 300-year-old witch (with a doll-come-to-life sidekick) using magic and manipulation to wreak havoc on the citizens of a New England town. Standard soap opera melodrama was juxtaposed with sorcery, supernatural creatures and closet doors leading to Hell.

In an attempt to boost ratings, Reilly was asked to return to Days of our Lives as head writer in the summer of 2003. Days executive producers gave Reilly carte blanche to "fix" the show (while simultaneously remaining as head writer for Passions). What followed was a controversial and attention-getting storyline in which multiple long-running characters on the series are brutally murdered by a serial killer dubbed the Salem Stalker. The story grew increasingly graphic (and ironic) as recovering alcoholic Maggie Horton is bludgeoned by a liquor bottle and original cast member and town matriarch Alice Horton chokes to death on a donut, her culinary specialty, forced down her throat. The reveal that heroine Marlena Evans was somehow the killer made the February 3, 2004 cover of Soap Opera Digest. This was not all; shortly after Marlena died after being exposed as the killer, all the victims were discovered alive on the island of Melaswen (New Salem backwards), which revealed that Marlena had in fact been mind controlled to believe she was the killer. Reilly left the series again in 2006.

== Death ==
After Reilly's October 2008 death, Executive Producer Ken Corday of Days of our Lives said of him, "The DAYS OF OUR LIVES family is deeply saddened by the recent passing of James E. Reilly. Our thoughts and prayers are with his family. Jim was not only an ingenious storyteller who changed the landscape of daytime drama, but he celebrated life with passion, humor, and an appreciation for the best it has to offer. He was an inspiration for us all...and will be greatly missed." Passions Executive Producer Lisa de Cazotte said, "Jim Reilly was not only a legend in our industry, but he was a great friend and mentor. His creativity, sense of humor and genius will be sorely missed. There will never be another like him and I am deeply grateful for the years we spent working together on PASSIONS and for the joy he brought to my life."

== Positions held ==
Capitol

- Associate Head writer: 1982

Ryan's Hope

- Associate Head writer: May 1984 - February 1985

General Hospital

- Outline Writer: 1985 - 1988

The Young and the Restless

- Script Writer: 1990

The Bold and the Beautiful

- Consultant: April 24 – August 22, 1990

Guiding Light

- Co-Head writer: 1990 - 1992

Days of Our Lives

- Head writer: December 21, 1992 - January 5, 1998; August 11, 2003 - August 9, 2006
- Associate Head writer: 1989

Sunset Beach

- Executive Story Consultant: 1997 - 1998

Passions

- Creator
- Head writer: 1999 - 2008
- Consulting Producer: 1999 - 2008

== Awards and nominations ==
Daytime Emmy Awards

WINS

- (1993; Best Writing; Guiding Light)

NOMINATIONS

- (1986; Best Writing; General Hospital)
- (1991; Best Writing; The Young and the Restless)
- (1992; Best Writing; Guiding Light)
- (1994, 1997 & 1998; Best Writing; Days of Our Lives)
- (2001, 2002 & 2003; Best Writing; Passions)

Writers Guild of America Award

WINS

- (1992 season; Guiding Light)

NOMINATIONS

- (1994 season; Days of Our Lives)
- (2001 season; Passions)
