= Daytime Emmy Award for Outstanding Drama Series Writing Team =

Television award category

- Awarded for: Outstanding Drama Series Writing Team
- Country: United States
- Presented by: NATAS; ATAS
- First award: 1974
- Currently held by: General Hospital (2025)

Highlights
- Most awards: The Young and the Restless (10)
- Most nominations: The Young and the Restless (35)
- Website: emmyonline.org/daytime

The Daytime Emmy Award for Outstanding Drama Series Writing Team is an award presented annually by the National Academy of Television Arts and Sciences (NATAS) and Academy of Television Arts & Sciences (ATAS). It was first awarded at the 1st Daytime Emmy Awards ceremony, held in 1974, and it is given to honor the performances of the entire writing team participating in a form of a daytime drama.

The award was previously called Outstanding Writing for a Drama Series between 1974 and 1986, where the category had various names and honored different members of the writing team. Therefore, since then, the category began to start using its current title years.

The Young and the Restless holds the record for most wins with nine. The Young and the Restless have also received the most nominations, with a total of twenty-seven. ABC has been the network the most successful, with a total of eighteen wins. In 1997, All My Children and The Young and the Restless tied, which was the first tie in this category.

As of the 2025 ceremony, General Hospital is the most recent recipient of the award.

== Winners and nominees ==
Listed below are the winners of the award for each year, as well as the other nominees.

Table key
‡	Indicates the winner

=== 1970s ===
Year	Program	Network	Ref
1974 (1st)	The Edge of Night‡	CBS	
1974 (1st)	The Doctors	NBC	
1974 (1st)	General Hospital	ABC	
1975 (2nd)	Another World‡	NBC	
1975 (2nd)	Days of Our Lives	NBC	
1975 (2nd)	The Young and the Restless	CBS	
1976 (3rd)	Days of Our Lives‡	NBC	
1976 (3rd)	All My Children	ABC	
1976 (3rd)	The Edge of Night	ABC	
1976 (3rd)	Guiding Light	CBS	
1976 (3rd)	The Young and the Restless	CBS	
1977 (4th)	Ryan's Hope‡	ABC	
1977 (4th)	All My Children	ABC	
1977 (4th)	Another World	NBC	
1977 (4th)	As the World Turns	CBS	
1977 (4th)	Days of Our Lives	NBC	
1978 (5th)	Ryan's Hope‡	ABC	
1978 (5th)	All My Children	ABC	
1978 (5th)	Days of Our Lives (Note: Days of our Lives was nominated for two episodes, each under a different head writer.)	NBC	
1978 (5th)	Guiding Light	CBS	
1979 (6th)	Ryan's Hope‡	ABC	
1979 (6th)	All My Children	ABC	
1979 (6th)	Days of Our Lives	NBC	
1979 (6th)	The Young and the Restless	CBS	

=== 1980s ===
Year	Program	Network	Ref
1980 (7th)	Ryan's Hope‡	ABC	
1980 (7th)	All My Children	ABC	
1980 (7th)	The Edge of Night	ABC	
1980 (7th)	One Life to Live	ABC	
1981 (8th)	Guiding Light‡	CBS	
1981 (8th)	All My Children	ABC	
1981 (8th)	General Hospital	CBS	
1981 (8th)	One Life to Live	ABC	
1982 (9th)	Guiding Light‡	CBS	
1982 (9th)	All My Children	ABC	
1982 (9th)	The Edge of Night	ABC	
1982 (9th)	One Life to Live	ABC	
1983 (10th)	Ryan's Hope‡	ABC	
1983 (10th)	All My Children	ABC	
1983 (10th)	General Hospital	ABC	
1983 (10th)	One Life to Live	ABC	
1984 (11th)	Ryan's Hope‡	ABC	
1984 (11th)	All My Children	ABC	
1984 (11th)	General Hospital	ABC	
1984 (11th)	One Life to Live	ABC	
1985 (12th)	All My Children‡	ABC	
1985 (12th)	Another World	NBC	
1985 (12th)	Days of Our Lives	NBC	
1985 (12th)	Guiding Light	CBS	
1986 (13th)	Guiding Light‡	CBS	
1986 (13th)	As the World Turns	CBS	
1986 (13th)	General Hospital	ABC	
1986 (13th)	The Young and the Restless	CBS	
1987 (14th)	One Life to Live‡	ABC	
1987 (14th)	Days of Our Lives	NBC	
1987 (14th)	The Young and the Restless	CBS	
1988 (15th)	All My Children‡	ABC	
1988 (15th)	The Judge	Syndication	
1988 (15th)	Santa Barbara	NBC	
1988 (15th)	Superior Court	Syndication	
1989 (16th)	Santa Barbara‡	NBC	
1989 (16th)	Another World	NBC	
1989 (16th)	As the World Turns	CBS	
1989 (16th)	Guiding Light	CBS	

=== 1990s ===
Year	Program	Network	Ref
1990 (17th)	Guiding Light‡	CBS	
1990 (17th)	All My Children	ABC	
1990 (17th)	One Life to Live	ABC	
1990 (17th)	Santa Barbara	NBC	
1990 (17th)	The Young and the Restless	CBS	
1991 (18th)	Santa Barbara‡	NBC	
1991 (18th)	All My Children	ABC	
1991 (18th)	As the World Turns	CBS	
1991 (18th)	The Young and the Restless	CBS	
1992 (19th)	The Young and the Restless‡	CBS	
1992 (19th)	All My Children	ABC	
1992 (19th)	Guiding Light	CBS	
1992 (19th)	One Life to Live	ABC	
1993 (20th)	Guiding Light‡	CBS	
1993 (20th)	All My Children	ABC	
1993 (20th)	As the World Turns	CBS	
1993 (20th)	The Young and the Restless	CBS	
1994 (21st)	One Life to Live‡	ABC	
1994 (21st)	Another World	NBC	
1994 (21st)	Days of Our Lives	NBC	
1994 (21st)	The Young and the Restless	CBS	
1995 (22nd)	General Hospital‡	ABC	
1995 (22nd)	All My Children	ABC	
1995 (22nd)	One Life to Live	ABC	
1995 (22nd)	The Young and the Restless	CBS	
1996 (26th)	All My Children‡	ABC	
1996 (26th)	Another World	NBC	
1996 (26th)	As the World Turns	CBS	
1996 (26th)	One Life to Live	ABC	
1997 (27th)	All My Children‡	ABC	
1997 (27th)	The Young and the Restless‡	CBS	
1997 (27th)	Days of Our Lives	NBC	
1997 (27th)	General Hospital	ABC	
1998 (27th)	All My Children‡	ABC	
1998 (27th)	Days of Our Lives	NBC	
1998 (27th)	General Hospital	ABC	
1998 (27th)	The Young and the Restless	CBS	
1999 (26th)	General Hospital‡	ABC	
1999 (26th)	All My Children	ABC	
1999 (26th)	Days of Our Lives	NBC	
1999 (26th)	Guiding Light	CBS	
1999 (26th)	The Young and the Restless	CBS	

=== 2000s ===
Year	Program	Network	Re
2000 (27th)	The Young and the Restless‡	CBS	
2000 (27th)	As the World Turns	CBS	
2000 (27th)	The Bold and the Beautiful	CBS	
2000 (27th)	General Hospital	ABC	
2001 (28th)	As the World Turns‡	CBS	
2001 (28th)	All My Children	ABC	
2001 (28th)	General Hospital	ABC	
2001 (28th)	Passions	NBC	
2001 (28th)	The Young and the Restless	CBS	
2002 (29th)	As the World Turns‡	CBS	
2002 (29th)	All My Children	ABC	
2002 (29th)	One Life to Live	ABC	
2002 (29th)	Passions	NBC	
2003 (30th)	General Hospital‡	ABC	
2003 (30th)	All My Children	ABC	
2003 (30th)	As the World Turns	CBS	
2003 (30th)	The Bold and the Beautiful	CBS	
2003 (30th)	Guiding Light	CBS	
2003 (30th)	Passions	NBC	
2003 (30th)	The Young and the Restless	CBS	
2004 (31st)	As the World Turns‡	CBS	
2004 (31st)	All My Children	ABC	
2004 (31st)	General Hospital	ABC	
2004 (31st)	The Young and the Restless	CBS	
2005 (32nd)	As the World Turns‡	CBS	
2005 (32nd)	General Hospital	ABC	
2005 (32nd)	Guiding Light	CBS	
2005 (32nd)	The Young and the Restless	CBS	
2006 (33rd)	The Young and the Restless‡	CBS	
2006 (33rd)	As the World Turns	CBS	
2006 (33rd)	The Bold and the Beautiful	CBS	
2006 (33rd)	One Life to Live	ABC	
2007 (34th)	Guiding Light‡	CBS	
2007 (34th)	The Bold and the Beautiful	CBS	
2007 (34th)	General Hospital	ABC	
2007 (34th)	The Young and the Restless	CBS	
2008 (35th)	One Life to Live‡	ABC	
2008 (35th)	The Bold and the Beautiful	CBS	
2008 (35th)	General Hospital	ABC	
2008 (35th)	Guiding Light	CBS	
2008 (35th)	The Young and the Restless	CBS	
2009 (36th)	General Hospital‡	ABC	
2009 (36th)	All My Children	ABC	
2009 (36th)	The Bold and the Beautiful	CBS	
2009 (36th)	One Life to Live	ABC	

=== 2010s ===
Year	Program	Network	Ref
2010 (37th)	The Bold and the Beautiful‡	CBS	
2010 (37th)	All My Children	ABC	
2010 (37th)	As the World Turns	CBS	
2010 (37th)	The Young and the Restless	CBS	
2011 (38th)	The Young and the Restless‡	CBS	
2011 (38th)	As the World Turns	CBS	
2011 (38th)	The Bold and the Beautiful	CBS	
2011 (38th)	Days of Our Lives	NBC	
2012 (39th)	Days of Our Lives‡	NBC	
2012 (39th)	All My Children	ABC	
2012 (39th)	General Hospital	ABC	
2012 (39th)	The Young and the Restless	CBS	
2013 (40th)	The Bold and the Beautiful‡ (Note: Head Writer: Bradley Bell Co-Head Writers: Kay Alden, Michael Minnis, Writers: Rex M. Best, Shannon Bradley, Adam Dusevoir, Tracey Ann Kelly, Patrick Mulcahey, John F. Smith, Michele Val Jean)	CBS	
2013 (40th)	General Hospital (Note: Head Writer: Ron Carlivati, Breakdown Writers: Shelly Altman, Jean Passanante, Chris Van Etten, Anna Theresa Cascio, Breakdown Writers: Kate Hall, Elizabeth Page, Scott Sickles, Katherine Schock, Editor: Elizabeth Korte)	ABC	
2013 (40th)	One Life to Live (Note: Head Writer: Ron Carlivati, Breakdown Writer: Lorraine Broderick, Associate Head Writers: Anna Cascio, Chris Van Etten, Script Writers: Elizabeth Page, Jean Passanante, Melissa Salmons, Scott Sickles, Courtney Simon, Script Writers, Breakdown Writer and Script Writer: Daniel J. O'Connor, Script Editor: Katherine Schock)	ABC	
2013 (40th)	The Young and the Restless (Note: Head Writers: Maria Arena Bell and Josh Griffith, Co-Head Writers: Scott Hamner, Hogan Sheffer, Associate Head Writers: Beth Milstein, Amanda Beall, Script Editor: Brent Boyd, Associate Writer/Script Editor: Beth Milstein, Associate Writers: Amanda L. Beall, Paula Cwikly, Susan Dansby, Janice Ferri Esser, Jay Gibson, Marla Kanelos, Anne Schoettle, Linda Schreiber, Natalie Minardi Slater, Teresa Zimmerman)	CBS	
2014 (41st)	The Young and the Restless‡ (Note: Head Writers: Shelly Altman, Josh Griffith, Co-Head Writer: Tracey Thomson, Associate Writers: Amanda Beall, Jeff Beldner, Brent Boyd, Susan Dansby, Janice Ferri Esser, Beth Milstein, Natalie Minardi Slater, Anne Schoettle, Lisa Seidman)	CBS	
2014 (41st)	The Bold and the Beautiful (Note: Head Writer: Bradley Bell Co-Head Writers: Kay Alden, Michael Minnis, Writers: Rex M. Best, Shannon Bradley, Adam Dusevoir, Tracey Ann Kelly, Patrick Mulcahey, John F. Smith, Michele Val Jean)	CBS	
2014 (41st)	Days of Our Lives (Note: Head Writer: Gary Tomlin, Christopher Whitesell, Breakdown Writers: Lorraine Broderick, Rick Draughon, Christopher Dunn, Ryan Quan, Dave Ryan, Writer: Fran Myers, Script Writers: David Cherrill, Carolyn Culliton, Richard Culliton, Jeanne Marie Ford, Janet Iacobuzio, David A. Levinson, Melissa Salmons)	NBC	
2015 (42nd)	The Bold and the Beautiful (Note: Head Writer: Bradley Bell Co-Head Writers: Michael Minnis, Writers: Rex M. Best, Shannon Bradley, Adam Dusevoir, Tracey Ann Kelly, Patrick Mulcahey, Jack F. Smith, Michele Val Jean)‡	CBS	
2015 (42nd)	Days of Our Lives (Note: Head Writer: Gary Tomlin, Christopher Whitesell, Script Editor: Fran Myers, Breakdown Writers: Lorraine Broderick, Rick Draughon, Christopher Dunn, Ryan Quan, Dave Ryan, Script Writers: David Cherrill, Carolyn Culliton, Richard Culliton, Jeanne Marie Ford, Janet Iacobuzio, Melissa Salmons)	NBC	
2015 (42nd)	General Hospital (Note: Head Writer: Ron Carlivati, Writers: Anna Theresa Cascio, Elizabeth Korte, Daniel James O'Connor, Chris Van Etten, Script Writers: Suzanne Flynn, Kate Hall, Elizabeth Page, Katherine Schock, Scott Sickles)	ABC	
2015 (42nd)	The Young and the Restless (Note: Head Writers: Shelly Altman, Jean Passanante, Script Editor: Brent Boyd, Co-Head Writer: Tracey Thomson, Writers: Amanda Beall, Jeff Beldner, Susan Dansby, Janice Ferri Esser, Beth Milstein, Natalie Minardi Slater, Anne Schoettle, Lisa Seidman)	CBS	
2016 (43rd)
2016 (43rd)	The Bold and the Beautiful ‡	CBS	
2016 (43rd)	General Hospital	ABC	
2016 (43rd)	The Young and the Restless	CBS	
2017 (44th)
2017 (44th)	The Young and the Restless ‡	CBS	
2017 (44th)	The Bold and the Beautiful	CBS	
2017 (44th)	Days of Our Lives	NBC	
2017 (44th)	General Hospital	ABC	
2018 (45th)	Days of Our Lives ‡	NBC	
2018 (45th)	The Bold and the Beautiful	CBS	
2018 (45th)	General Hospital	ABC	
2018 (45th)	The Young and the Restless	CBS	
2019 (46th)	The Young and the Restless‡	CBS	
2019 (46th)	The Bold and the Beautiful	CBS	
2019 (46th)	Days of Our Lives	NBC	
2019 (46th)	General Hospital	ABC	

=== 2020s ===
Year	Program	Network	Ref
2020 (47th)	The Bold and the Beautiful ‡	CBS	
2020 (47th)	Days of Our Lives	NBC	
2020 (47th)	General Hospital	ABC	
2020 (47th)	The Young and the Restless	CBS	
2021 (48th)	The Young and the Restless ‡	CBS	
2021 (48th)	The Bold and the Beautiful	CBS	
2021 (48th)	General Hospital	ABC	
2022 (49th)	Days of Our Lives ‡	NBC	
2022 (49th)	Beyond Salem	Peacock	
2022 (49th)	General Hospital	ABC	
2022 (49th)	The Young and the Restless	CBS	
2023 (50th)	The Young and the Restless ‡	CBS	
2023 (50th)	The Bay	Popstar! TV	
2023 (50th)	The Bold and the Beautiful	CBS	
2023 (50th)	Beyond Salem: Chapter Two	Peacock	
2023 (50th)	Days of Our Lives	NBC/Peacock	
2023 (50th)	General Hospital	ABC	
2024 (51st)	General Hospital ‡	ABC	
2024 (51st)	The Bay	Popstar! TV	
2024 (51st)	The Bold and the Beautiful	CBS	
2024 (51st)	Days of Our Lives	Peacock	
2024 (51st)	The Young and the Restless	CBS	
2025 (52nd)	General Hospital ‡	ABC	
2025 (52nd)	Days of Our Lives	Peacock	
2025 (52nd)	The Young and the Restless	CBS	
2026 (53rd)	General Hospital ‡	ABC	
2026 (53rd)	Beyond the Gates	CBS	
2026 (53rd)	The Bold and the Beautiful	CBS	
2026 (53rd)	Days of Our Lives	Peacock	

== Series with multiple wins ==
10 wins

- The Young and the Restless

7 wins

- General Hospital

6 wins

- Ryan's Hope
- Guiding Light

5 wins

- All My Children
- The Bold and the Beautiful

4 wins

- As the World Turns
- Days of our Lives

3 wins

- One Life to Live

2 wins

- Santa Barbara
