= 51st Daytime Emmy Awards =

- Date: June 7, 2024
- Location: Westin Bonaventure Hotel; Los Angeles, California, U.S.
- Presented by: National Academy of Television Arts and Sciences (NATAS)
- Hosted by: Kevin Frazier; Nischelle Turner
- Most awards: General Hospital (7)
- Most nominations: Main: The Bold and the Beautiful (10); All: The Bold and the Beautiful / The Young and the Restless (12)

Television/radio coverage
- Network: CBS; Paramount+
- Produced by: Adam Sharp (NATAS); Lisa Armstrong (NATAS); David McKenzie (ATI)

The 51st Daytime Emmy Awards, presented by the National Academy of Television Arts and Sciences, honored the best in U.S. daytime television programming in 2023. The award ceremony was held on June 7, 2024, at the Westin Bonaventure Hotel in Los Angeles.

Kevin Frazier and Nischelle Turner, co-anchors of the syndicated entertainment news magazine Entertainment Tonight, hosted the ceremony for the third consecutive year.

The full list of nominations were announced on April 19, 2024, with some of the top key categories being unveiled on April 18 on programs such as Access Hollywood, Entertainment Tonight, Extra and E! News.

CBS holds the U.S. rights to broadcast the ceremony and stream it on Paramount+ under the final year of two-year deal.

== Category and rule changes ==
The award for Outstanding Younger Performer in a Drama Series was retired, and younger performers will now have to enter into the regular lead, supporting or guest acting categories.

== Winners and nominees ==
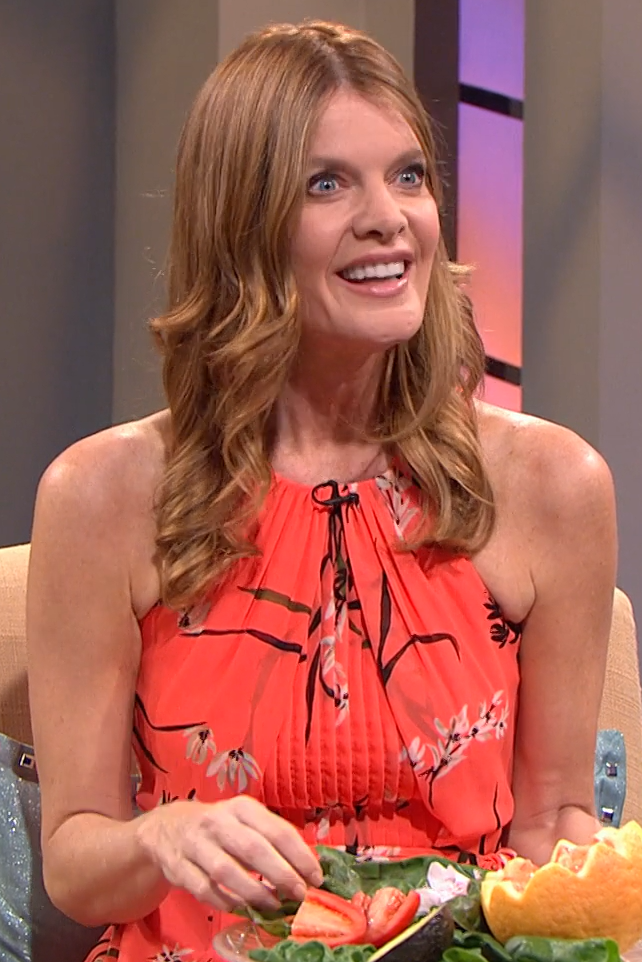
Michelle Stafford, Outstanding Lead Actress in a Drama Series winner

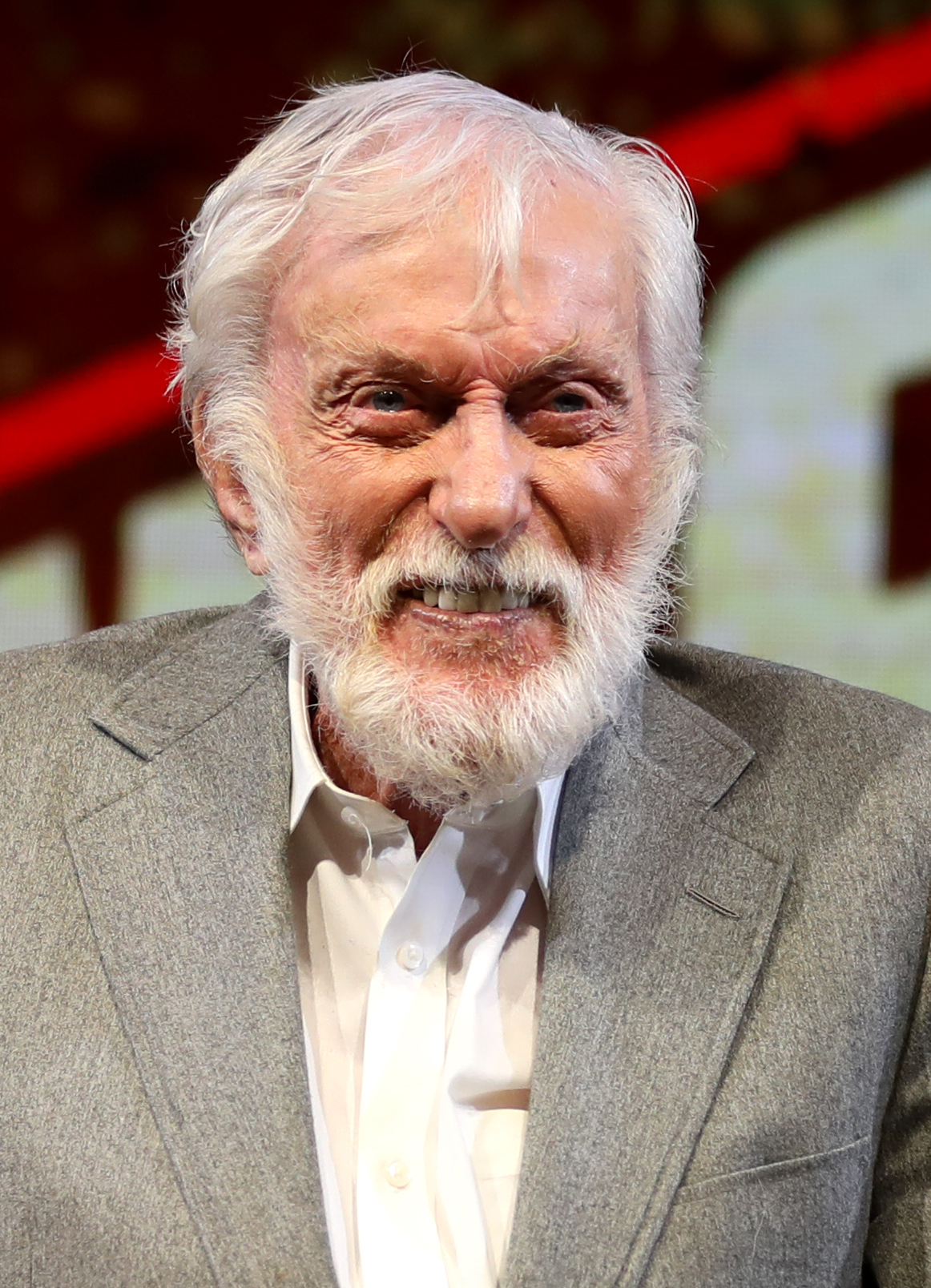
Dick Van Dyke, Outstanding Guest Performer in a Drama Series winner

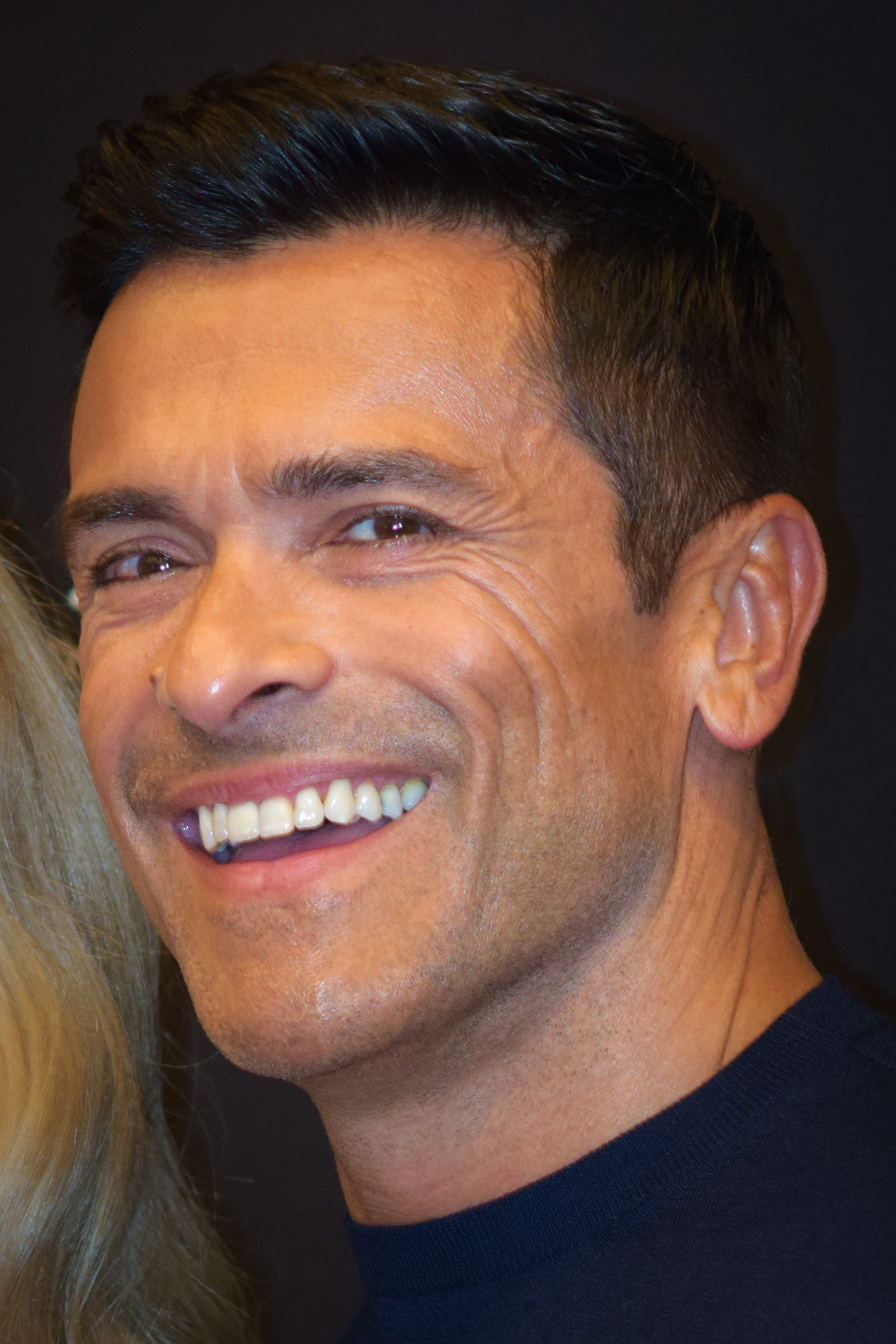
Mark Consuelos, Outstanding Daytime Talk Series Host co-winner

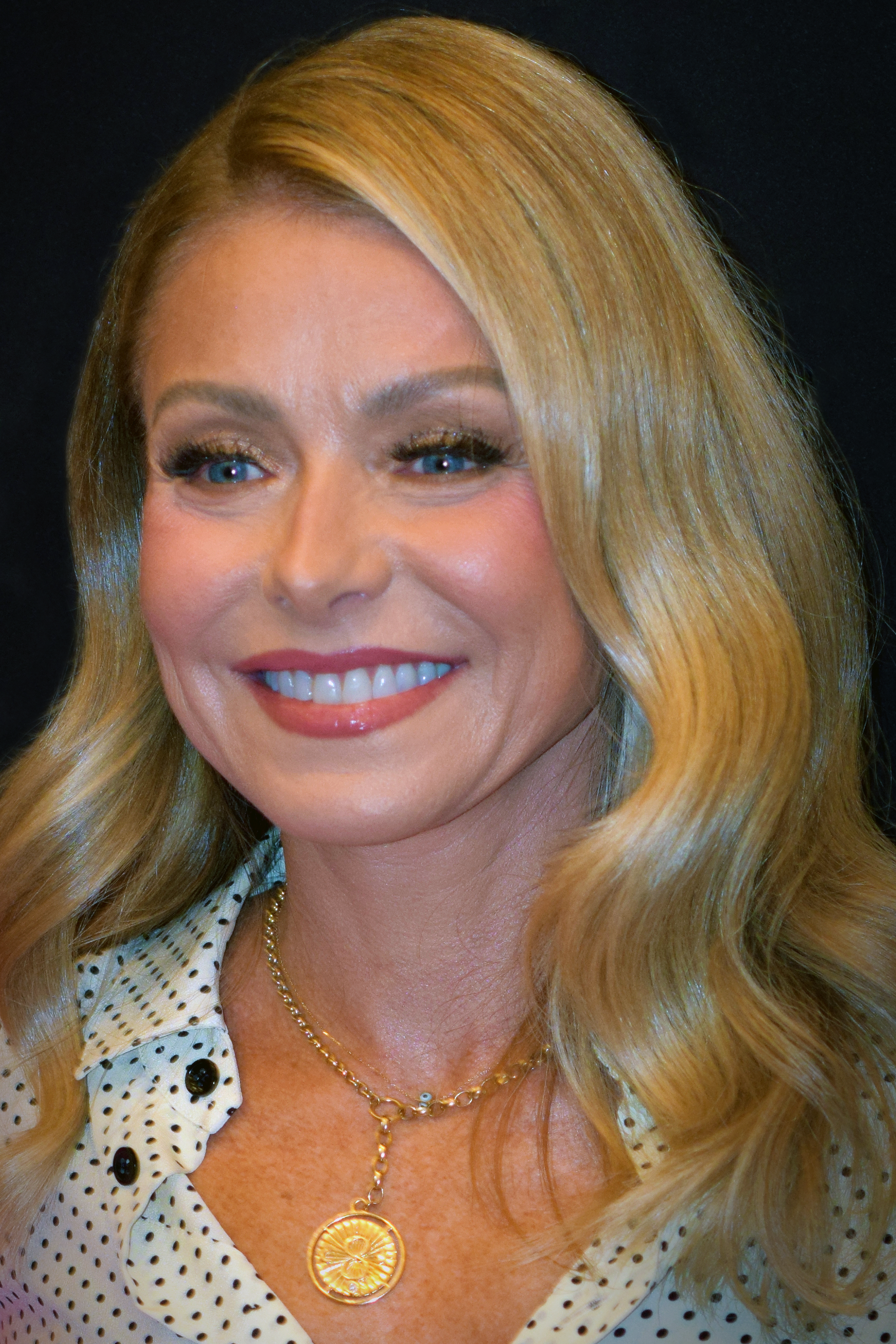
Kelly Ripa, Outstanding Daytime Talk Series Host co-winner

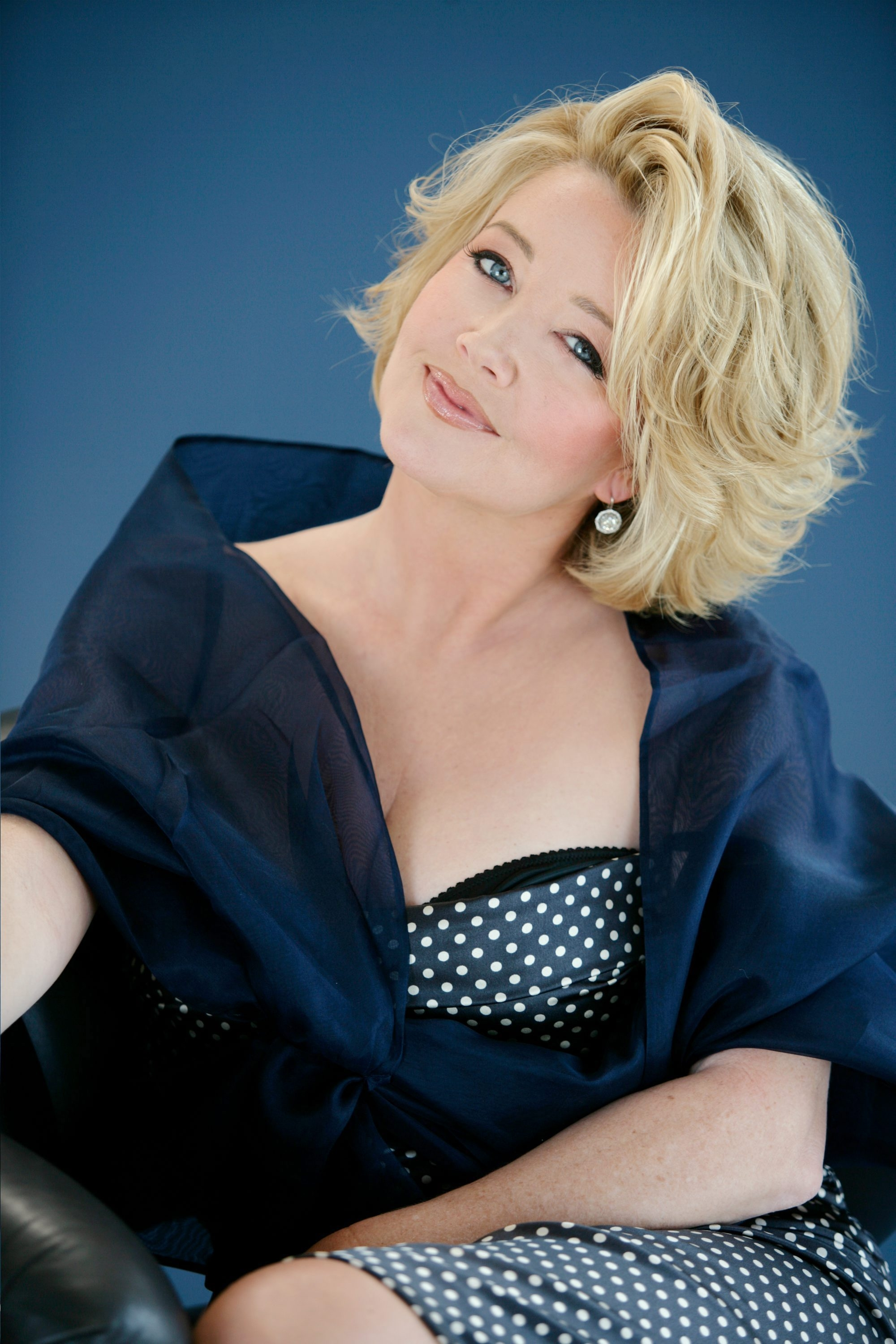
Melody Thomas Scott, Lifetime Achievement Award recipient

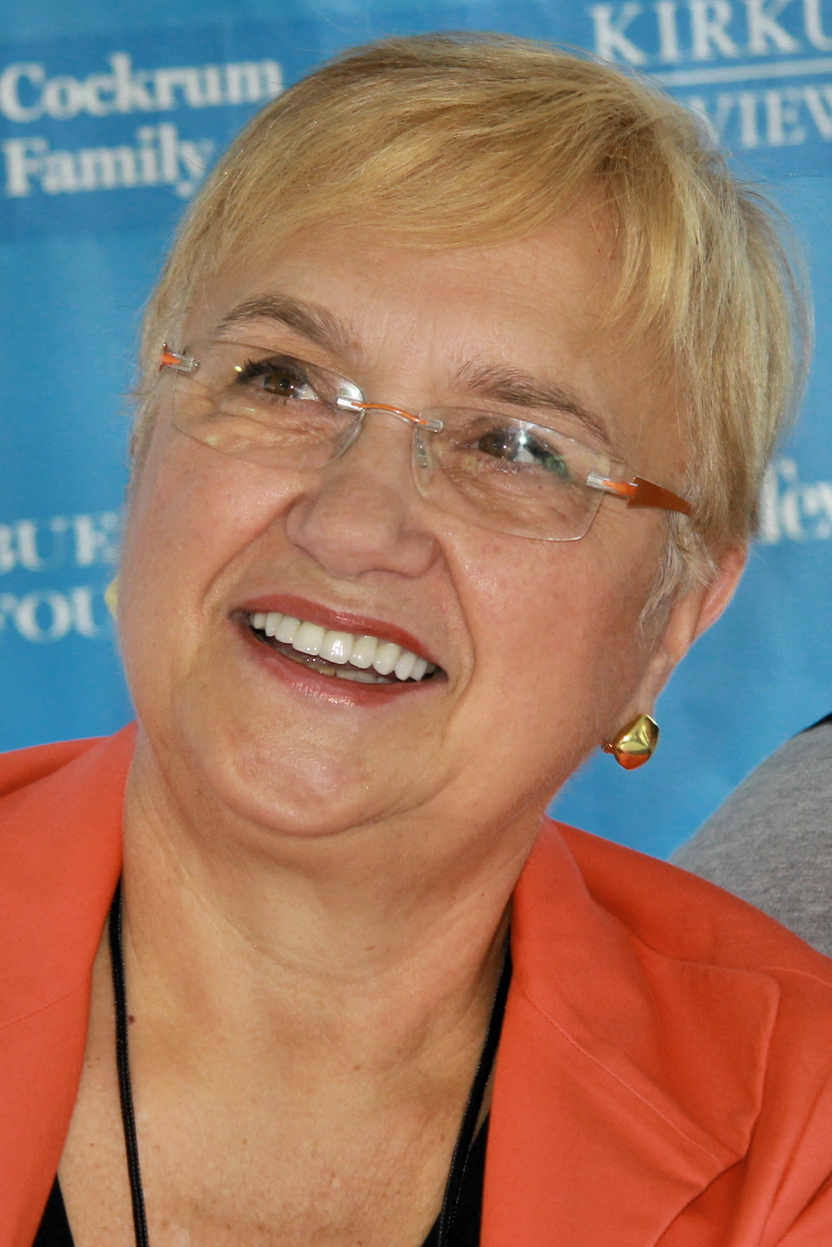
Lidia Bastianich, Lifetime Achievement Award recipient

The first five categories were announced on April 18, 2024, the rest were announced the following day.

=== Programming ===
Programming
Outstanding Drama Series: General Hospital (ABC); The Bay (Popstar! TV); The Bold and the Beautiful (CBS); Days of Our Lives (Peacock); Neighbours (Freevee); The Young and the Restless (CBS)	Outstanding Daytime Talk Series: The Kelly Clarkson Show (Syndicated); The Jennifer Hudson Show (Syndicated); Tamron Hall (Syndicated); Turning the Tables with Robin Roberts (Disney+); The View (ABC)
Outstanding Entertainment News Series: Entertainment Tonight (Syndicated); Access Hollywood (Syndicated); Extra (Syndicated)	Outstanding Culinary Series: Be My Guest with Ina Garten (Food Network); Family Dinner (Magnolia Network); Selena + Chef: Home for the Holidays (Max); Valerie's Home Cooking (Food Network); What Am I Eating? with Zooey Deschanel (Max)

=== Acting ===
Acting
Outstanding Lead Actor in a Drama Series: Thorsten Kaye as Ridge Forrester on The Bold and the Beautiful (CBS); Eric Braeden as Victor Newman on The Young and the Restless (CBS); Scott Clifton as Liam Spencer on The Bold and the Beautiful (CBS); Eric Martsolf as Brady Black on Days of Our Lives (Peacock); John McCook as Eric Forrester on The Bold and the Beautiful (CBS)	Outstanding Lead Actress in a Drama Series: Michelle Stafford as Phyllis Summers on The Young and the Restless (CBS); Tamara Braun as Ava Vitali on Days of Our Lives (Peacock); Finola Hughes as Anna Devane on General Hospital (ABC); Katherine Kelly Lang as Brooke Logan on The Bold and the Beautiful (CBS); Annika Noelle as Hope Logan Spencer on The Bold and the Beautiful (CBS); Cynthia Watros as Nina Reeves on General Hospital (ABC)
Outstanding Supporting Actor in a Drama Series: Robert Gossett as Marshall Ashford on General Hospital (ABC); Bryton James as Devon Winters on The Young and the Restless (CBS); Wally Kurth as Justin Kiriakis on Days of Our Lives (Peacock); A Martinez as Nardo Ramos on The Bay (Popstar! TV); Mike Manning as Caleb McKinnon on The Bay (Popstar! TV)	Outstanding Supporting Actress in a Drama Series: Courtney Hope as Sally Spectra on The Young and the Restless (CBS); Jennifer Gareis as Donna Logan on The Bold and the Beautiful (CBS); Linsey Godfrey as Sarah Horton on Days of Our Lives (Peacock); Allison Lanier as Summer Newman on The Young and the Restless (CBS); Emily O'Brien as Gwen Rizczech on Days of Our Lives (Peacock)
Outstanding Guest Performer in a Drama Series: Dick Van Dyke as Mystery Man/Timothy Robicheaux on Days of Our Lives (Peacock); Linden Ashby as Cameron Kirsten on The Young and the Restless (CBS); Ashley Jones as Dr. Bridget Forrester on The Bold and the Beautiful (CBS); Alley Mills as Heather Webber on General Hospital (ABC); Guy Pearce as Mike Young on Neighbours (Freevee)

=== Hosting & Daytime Personality ===
Hosting
Outstanding Daytime Talk Series Host: Mark Consuelos and Kelly Ripa – Live with Kelly and Mark (Syndicated); Joy Behar, Whoopi Goldberg, Alyssa Farah Griffin, Sara Haines, Sunny Hostin, Ana Navarro – The View (ABC); Kelly Clarkson – The Kelly Clarkson Show (Syndicated); Akbar Gbajabiamila, Amanda Kloots, Natalie Morales, Jerry O'Connell, Sheryl Underwood – The Talk (CBS); Tamron Hall – Tamron Hall (Syndicated)	Outstanding Daytime Personality – Daily: Kevin Frazier, Nischelle Turner, Matt Cohen, Cassie DiLaura, Denny Directo, Will Marfuggi, Rachel Smith – Entertainment Tonight (Syndicated); Frank Caprio – Caught in Providence (Facebook Watch); Deborah Norville, Steven Fabian, Lisa Guerrero, Ann Mercogliano, Jim Moret, Les Trent – Inside Edition (Syndicated); Robert Hernandez, Star Jones – Divorce Court (FOX); Judge Judy Sheindlin, Whitney Kumar, Kevin Rasco, Sarah Rose – Judy Justice (Freevee)

=== Directing/Writing ===
Directing/Writing
Outstanding Directing Team for a Drama Series: General Hospital – Tina Keller, Robert Markham, Allison Reames Smith, Gary Tomlin, Frank Valentini, Denise Van Cleave, Phideaux Xavier, Teresa Cicala, Jillian Dedote, Peter Fillmore, Paul Glass, Marika Kushel, Dave MacLeod, Christine Magarian Ucar, Kyle Bell, Craig McManus, Nate Hapke, Kelli Kuschman (ABC); The Bay – Gregori J. Martin (Popstar! TV); The Bold and the Beautiful – Jennifer Howard, Anthony Pascarelli, Cynthia J. Popp, Marc Beruti, Brian Connell, Erica Ginger Briton, Jennifer Scott Christenson, Cathy Sedwick, Jason Galland, Herbert Weaver, Lisa Winther Huston, Robin Harvey Adams (CBS); Days of Our Lives – Albert Alarr, Sonia Blangiardo, Noel Maxam, Scott McKinsey, Kevin Church, Michael Fiamingo, Joseph Lumer, Sara Peterson McCormick, Holly Metts, Jessie Harrison, Lucy Yalenian, Adriana Alvarado, Alexis Straiten, Jennifer Werwage (Peacock); The Young and the Restless – Michael Eilbaum, Sally McDonald, Nancy Ortenberg, Owen Renfroe, Steven Williford, Derek Berlatsky, Andrew Hachem, Robbin Phillips, Martin Fritz Brekeller, Kristin Doherty, Alexandra Jensen, Andrew Wells (CBS)	Outstanding Writing Team for a Drama Series: General Hospital – Dan O'Connor, Chris Van Etten, Elizabeth Korte, Ashley D. Cook, Emily Culliton, Suzanne Flynn, Lucky Gold, Shannon Peace, Charlotte Gibson, Kate Hall, Dave Rupel, Lisa Seidman, Scott Sickles (ABC); The Bay – Gregori J. Martin, Wendy Riche, Kristos Andrews, Precious V. Mayes (Popstar! TV); The Bold and the Beautiful – Bradley P. Bell, Michael Minnis, Rex M. Best, Shannon B. Bradley, Adam Dusevoir, Tracey Ann Kelly, Mark Pinciotti, Lawrence Saint-Victor, Michele Val Jean (CBS); Days of Our Lives – Ron Carlivati, Ryan Quan, Christopher Dunn, Jeanne Marie Ford, Jamey Giddens, Dave Ryan, Katherine Schock, Sonja Alarr, Joanna Cohen, Richard Culliton, Kirk Doering, David Kreizman, Fran Myers, Henry Newman (Peacock); The Young and the Restless – Josh Griffith, Amanda L. Beall, Jeff Beldner, Susan Banks, Sara Bibel, Brent Boyd, Sara Endsley, Janice Ferri Esser, Marin Gazzaniga, Simone Hawthorne, Lynn Martin, Rebecca McCarthy, Natalie Minardi Slater (CBS)

== Lifetime Achievement Awards ==
The NATAS announced the following recipients of the Lifetime Achievement Awards on May 13, 2024:

- Melody Thomas Scott, long-running actress on The Young and the Restless who portrays Nikki Newman since 1979.
- Edward J. Scott, long-running soap opera producer.
- Lidia Bastianich, celebrity chef.
