= Kate Hall (soap opera writer) =

American television soap opera writer

Kate Hall is an American television soap opera writer. She is the daughter of veteran soap opera writer and actor Courtney Simon and soap opera actor Peter Simon.

Hall won a Daytime Emmy Award as a member of the writing team on The Young and the Restless in 2017, and three as a member of the writing team on General Hospital: in 2024, 2025, and 2026.

Hall has also won a Writers Guild of America award for Daytime Serials for her work on General Hospital in 2015, 2016, 2018, and 2019.

== Career ==
Hall wrote scripts for All My Children from 2007 to 2011. She joined General Hospital in 2011, writing for them until 2015. She left in 2016 to write scripts for The Young and the Restless. During her time with General Hospital, she also wrote for General Hospital: Night Shift. Hall left The Young and the Restless and returned to General Hospital in 2017.

== Accolades ==
Hall was nominated for the Daytime Emmy Award for Outstanding Drama Series Writing Team fifteen (Note: The press release for the 50th Daytime Emmy Awards in 2023 listed only the show titles, so that year is not counted.) times. She received nominations for her work on All My Children in 2009, 2010, and 2012. For her work on General Hospital, she was nominated in 2013, 2015, 2016, 2018, 2019, 2020, 2021, 2022, 2024, 2025, and 2026. She won the Emmy in 2024, 2025, and 2026.

She also won an Emmy as part of the writing team for The Young and the Restless in 2017.

Hall has also been nominated for the Writer's Guild of America awards fourteen times. She was nominated as part of the writing team for All My Children in 2008, 2010, and 2012. As part of the General Hospital writing team, she received nominations in 2014, 2015, 2016, 2018, 2019, 2020, 2021, 2022, 2024,, 2025, and 2026.

She won the award in 2015, 2016, 2018, and 2019.

Daytime Emmys
Year	Work	Recipients	Result	Ref.
2009	All My Children	Amanda Beall; Jeff Beldner; James Harmon Brown; Joanna Cohen; Barbara Esensten; Kate Hall; Chip Hayes; Daran Little; Agnes Nixon; Charles Pratt Jr.; Rebecca Taylor; Tracey Thomson; Addie Walsh	Nominated	
2010	All My Children	Jeff Beldner; Joanna Cohen; Christopher Dunn; Kate Hall; Chip Hayes; James Kahn; Daran Little; Agnes Nixon; Michelle Patrick; Charles Pratt Jr.; Rebecca Taylor; Tracey Thomson; Addie Walsh	Nominated	
2012	All My Children	Jeff Beldner; Lorraine Broderick; James Harmon Brown; Joanna Cohen; Lisa K. Connor; Christopher Dunn; Barbara Esensten; Lucky Gold; Kate Hall; Chip Hayes; David Kreizman; Agnes Nixon; Dave Ryan; Donna Swajeski; Rebecca Taylor; Addie Walsh	Nominated	
2013	General Hospital	Head writer: Ron Carlivati; Breakdown writers: Shelly Altman; Jean Passanante; Chris Van Etten; Anna Theresa Cascio; Script writers: Kate Hall; Elizabeth Page; Scott Sickles; Katherine Schock; Editor: Elizabeth Korte	Nominated	
2015	General Hospital	Head writer: Ron Carlivati; Writers: Anna Theresa Cascio; Elizabeth Korte; Daniel James O'Connor; Chris Van Etten; Script writers: Suzanne Flynn; Kate Hall; Elizabeth Page; Katherine Schock; Scott Sickles	Nominated	
2016	General Hospital	Head writers: Shelly Altman; Ron Carlivati; Jean Passanante; Breakdown writers: Anna Theresa Cascio; Daniel James O'Connor; Chris Van Etten; Writer: Elizabeth Korte; Script writers: Andrea Archer Compton; Suzanne Flynn; Kate Hall; Katherine Schock; Scott Sickles	Nominated	
2017	The Young and the Restless	Head writer: Charles Pratt Jr.; Co-head writer: Tracey Thomson; Script editor: Brent Boyd; Writers: Amanda L. Beall; Jeff Beldner; Michael Conforti; Susan Dansby; Christopher Dunn; Janice Ferri Esser; Lloyd Gold; Kate Hall; Rebecca Taylor McCarty; Michael Montgomery; Natalie Minardi Slater	Won	
2018	General Hospital	Head writers: Shelly Altman; Jean Passanante; Co-head writer: Chris Van Etten; Associate head writers: Anna Cascio; Elizabeth Korte; Dan O'Connor; Writers: Lucky Gold; Christopher Whitesell; Script writers: Suzanne Flynn; Charlotte Gibson; Kate Hall; Dave Rupel; Katherine Schock; Scott Sickles	Nominated	
2019	General Hospital	Head writer: Shelly Altman; Co-head writer: Chris Van Etten; Associate head writers: Anna Cascio; Dan O'Connor; Writers: Barbara Bloom; Lucky Gold; Elizabeth Korte; Script writers: Suzanne Flynn; Charlotte Gibson; Kate Hall; Donny Sheldon; Scott Sickles	Nominated	
2020	General Hospital	Head writers: Shelly Altman; Daniel James O'Connor; Chris Van Etten; Writers: Barbara Bloom; Anna Theresa Cascio; Suzanne Flynn; Charlotte Gibson; Lucky Gold; Kate Hall; Elizabeth Korte; Donny Sheldon; Scott Sickles	Nominated	
2021	General Hospital	Head writers: Dan O'Connor; Chris Van Etten; Associate head writer: Anna Theresa Cascio; Writers: Barbara Bloom; Suzanne Flynn; Charlotte Gibson; Lucky Gold; Kate Hall; Elizabeth Korte; Lisa Seidman; Dave Rupel; Donny Sheldon; Scott Sickles	Nominated	
2022	General Hospital	Head writers: Dan O'Connor; Chris Van Etten; Associate head writer: Anna Theresa Cascio; Writers: Barbara Bloom; Suzanne Flynn; Charlotte Gibson; Lucky Gold; Kate Hall; Elizabeth Korte; Shannon Peace; Dave Rupel; Lisa Seidman; Scott Sickles	Nominated	
2024	General Hospital	Head writers: Dan O'Connor; Chris Van Etten; Writer: Elizabeth Korte; Breakdown writers: Ashley D. Cook; Emily Culliton; Suzanne Flynn; Lucky Gold; Shannon Peace; Script writers: Charlotte Gibson; Kate Hall; Stacey Pulwer; Dave Rupel; Lisa Seidman; Scott Sickles	Won	
2025	General Hospital	Head writers: Elizabeth Korte; Patrick Mulcahey; Dan O'Connor; Chris Van Etten; Breakdown writers: Emily Culliton; Suzanne Flynn; Writers: Cathy LePard; Anne Schoettle; Script writers: Charlotte Gibson; Kate Hall; Stacey Pulwer; Scott Sickles	Won	
2026	General Hospital	Head writers: Elizabeth Korte; Chris Van Etten; Writers: Nigel Campbell; Emily Culliton; Suzanne Flynn; Charlotte Gibson; Kate Hall; Cathy LePard; Stacey Pulwer; Ryan Quan; Scott Sickles; Micah Steinberg	Won	

Writer's Guild of America
Year	Work	Recipients	Result	Ref.
2008	All My Children	Amanda L. Beall; Jeff Beldner; James Harmon Brown; Courtney Bugler; Joanna Cohen; Stephen Demorest; Barbara Esensten; Kate Hall; Chip Hayes; Marla Kanelos; Karen Lewis; Megan McTavish; Michelle Patrick; Rebecca Taylor; Addie Walsh	Nominated	
2010	All My Children	Jeff Beldner; Joanna Cohen; Kate Hall; Chip Hayes; Michelle Patrick; Charles Pratt Jr.; Rebecca Taylor; Tracey Thomson; Addie Walsh	Nominated	
2012	All My Children	Jeff Beldner; Lorraine Broderick; Joanna Cohen; Lisa K. Connor; Chris Dunn; Lucky Gold; Kate Hall; Chip Hayes; David Kreizman; Dave Ryan; Donna Swajeski; Rebecca Taylor; Addie Walsh	Nominated	
2014	General Hospital	Shelly Altman; Ron Carlivati; Anna Theresa Cascio; Suzanne Flynn; Kate Hall; Elizabeth Korte; Daniel James O'Connor; Jean Passanante; Elizabeth Page; Katherine Schock; Scott Sickles; Chris Van Etten	Nominated	
2015	General Hospital	Ron Carlivati; Anna Theresa Cascio; Suzanne Flynn; Kate Hall; Elizabeth Korte; Daniel James O'Connor; Elizabeth Page; Katherine Schock; Scott Sickles; Chris Van Etten	Won	
2016	General Hospital	Ron Carlivati; Anna Theresa Cascio; Andrea Archer Compton; Suzanne Flynn; Kate Hall; Elizabeth Korte; Daniel James O'Connor; Elizabeth Page; Jean Passanante; Katherine Schock; Scott Sickles; Chris Van Etten	Won	
2018	General Hospital	Head Writers: Shelly Altman; Jean Passanante; Writers: Anna Theresa Cascio; Suzanne Flynn; Charlotte Gibson; Lucky Gold; Kate Hall; Elizabeth Korte; Daniel James O'Connor; Dave Rupel; Katherine Schock; Scott Sickles; Christopher Van Etten; Christopher Whitesell	Won	
2019	General Hospital	Head Writers: Shelly Altman; Chris Van Etten; Writers: Barbara Bloom; Anna Theresa Cascio; Suzanne Flynn; Charlotte Gibson; Lucky Gold; Kate Hall; Elizabeth Korte; Daniel James O'Connor; Donny Sheldon; Scott Sickles	Won	
2020	General Hospital	Head Writers: Shelly Altman; Chris Van Etten; Associate head writers: Anna T. Cascio; Dan O'Connor; Writers: Barbara Bloom; Suzanne Flynn; Charlotte Gibson; Lucky Gold; Kate Hall; Elizabeth Korte; Donny Sheldon; Scott Sickles	Nominated	
2021	General Hospital	Head Writers: Dan O'Connor; Chris Van Etten; Associate head writer: Anna Theresa Cascio; Writers: Barbara Bloom; Suzanne Flynn; Charlotte Gibson; Lucky Gold; Kate Hall; Elizabeth Korte; David Rupel; Lisa Seidman; Donny Sheldon; Scott Sickles	Nominated	
2022	General Hospital	Head Writers: Dan O'Connor; Chris Van Etten; Writers: Barbara Bloom; Suzanne Flynn; Charlotte Gibson; Lucky Gold; Kate Hall; Elizabeth Korte; Shannon Peace; David Rupel; Lisa Seidman; Scott Sickles	Nominated	
2024	General Hospital	Head Writers: Dan O'Connor; Chris Van Etten; Writers: Ashley Cook; Emily Culliton; Suzanne Flynn; Charlotte Gibson; Lucky Gold; Kate Hall; Elizabeth Korte; Shannon Peace; Stacey Pulwer; Dave Rupel; Lisa Seidman; Scott Sickles	Nominated	
2025	General Hospital	Head writers: Elizabeth Korte; Chris Van Etten; Writers: Nigel Campbell; Ashley Cook; Emily Culliton; Suzanne Flynn; Charlotte Gibson; Lucky Gold; Kate Hall; Catherine LePard; Patrick Mulcahy; Dan O'Connor; Shannon Peace; Stacey Pulwer; Anne Schoettle; Scott Sickles; Micah Steinberg	Nominated	
2026	General Hospital	Head writers: Elizabeth Korte; Chris Van Etten; Writers: Nigel Campbell; Emily Culliton; Suzanne Flynn; Charlotte Gibson; Kate Hall; Cathy LePard; Stacey Pulwer; Ryan Quan; Louise Rozett; Scott Sickles; Micah Steinberg	Nominated	
