= Joanna Cohen =

American television soap opera writer

Joanna B. Cohen
- Education: Columbia University, Master of Fine Arts
- Occupation: Screenwriter
- Years active: 2006 – present
- Notable credits: All My Children; Days of Our Lives; Beyond Salem
- Awards: For Days of Our Lives: Daytime Emmy; 2022; Writers Guild of America; 2021; 2022; 2023; 2024

Joanna Cohen is an American television soap opera writer and former Sports Illustrated journalist who has been nominated for nine Daytime Emmy Awards and nine Writers Guild of America Awards for her work as part of the writing teams on All My Children, Days of Our Lives, and Days of Our Lives: Beyond Salem. She won one Daytime Emmy for Days in 2022, and four Writers Guild Awards for Days: in 2021, 2022, 2023, and 2024.

== Career ==
Cohen started her writing career as a reporter for Sports Illustrated. She served as a project coordinator for the magazine with CNN in New York City and as a special projects editor for SI.com. She also published the juvenile nonfiction book Baseball Superstars under the Sports Illustrated Kids label in 1997. Cohen has also contributed writing to The New York Times and The Wall Street Journal.

She started writing for soaps in 2006. She has written for All My Children, Days of Our Lives, and Beyond Salem.

== Personal life ==
Cohen is married to Evan Kanew and has a daughter. They live in New York City. Cohen graduated from Columbia University with an MFA, and has self-published a novel titled Sweet Child.

== Accolades ==
Cohen was nominated for the Daytime Emmy Award for Outstanding Drama Series Writing Team nine times: (Note: The press release for the 50th Daytime Emmy Awards in 2023 listed only the show titles, so that year is not counted; she worked on both Days and Beyond Salem that year, and both shows were nominated.) in 2009; 2010; 2012; 2019; 2020; 2022, for both Days of Our Lives – which she won – and Beyond Salem; 2024; and 2026.

Cohen has been nominated for the Writers Guild of America award for Daytime Serials three times for her work on All My Children in 2008, 2010, 2012; and six times for her work on Days, in 2019, 2020, 2021, 2022, 2023, and 2024. She won the award four times: in 2021, 2022, 2023, and 2024.

Daytime Emmy nominations and awards for Joanna Cohen
Year	Work	Recipients	Result	Ref.
2009	All My Children	Amanda Beall; Jeff Beldner; James Harmon Brown; Joanna Cohen; Barbara Esensten; Kate Hall; Chip Hayes; Daran Little; Agnes Nixon; Charles Pratt Jr.; Rebecca Taylor; Tracey Thomson; Addie Walsh	Nominated	
2010	All My Children	Jeff Beldner; Joanna Cohen; Christopher Dunn; Kate Hall; Chip Hayes; James Kahn; Daran Little; Agnes Nixon; Michelle Patrick; Charles Pratt Jr.; Rebecca Taylor; Tracey Thomson; Addie Walsh	Nominated	
2012	All My Children	Jeff Beldner; Lorraine Broderick; James Harmon Brown; Joanna Cohen; Lisa K. Connor; Christopher Dunn; Barbara Esensten; Lucky Gold; Kate Hall; Chip Hayes; David Kreizman; Agnes Nixon; Dave Ryan; Donna Swajeski; Rebecca Taylor; Addie Walsh	Nominated	
2019	Days of Our Lives	Head writer: Ron Carlivati; Writer: Ryan Quan; Breakdown writers: Lorraine Broderick; Rick Draughon; Jeanne Marie Ford; Dave Ryan; Elizabeth Snyder; Script editor: Fran Myers; Script writers: Sheri Anderson; Joanna Cohen; Lisa Connor; Carolyn Culliton; Richard Culliton; David Kreizman; Rebecca McCarty; Katherine Schock	Nominated	
2020	Days of Our Lives	Head writer: Ron Carlivati; Creative consultant: Ryan Quan; Script editor: Fran Myers; Script writers: Joanna Cohen; Carolyn Culliton; Richard Culliton; David Kreizman; Rebecca McCarty; Katherine Schock; Associate writers: Lorraine Broderick; Rick Draughon; Jeanne Marie Ford; Dave Ryan; Elizabeth Snyder	Nominated	
2022	Days of Our Lives	Head writer: Ron Carlivati; Associate writer: Ryan Quan; Writer: Fran Myers; Breakdown writers: Lorraine Broderick; Jeanne Marie Ford; Jamey Giddens; Dave Ryan; Katherine Schock; Elizabeth Snyder; Script writers: Joanna Cohen; Carolyn Culliton; Richard Culliton; David Kreizman; Rebecca McCarty	Won	
2022	Days of Our Lives: Beyond Salem	Head writer: Ron Carlivati; Associate writer: Ryan Quan; Writer: Fran Myers; Breakdown writers: Lorraine Broderick; Jeanne Marie Ford; Jamey Giddens; Dave Ryan; Katherine Schock; Script writers: Joanna Cohen; Carolyn Culliton; Richard Culliton; David Kreizman; Rebecca McCarty	Nominated	
2024	Days of Our Lives	Head writer: Ron Carlivati; Associate head writer: Ryan Quan; Breakdown writers: Christopher Dunn; Jeanne Marie Ford; Jamey Giddens; Dave Ryan; Katherine Schock; Script writers: Sonja Alarr; Joanna Cohen; Richard Culliton; Kirk Doering; David Kreizman; Fran Myers; Henry Newman	Nominated	
2026	Days of Our Lives	Head writers: Ron Carlivati; Paula Cwikly; Jeanne Marie Ford; Writers: Joanna Cohen; Kate Culliton; Kirk Doering; David Kreizman; Henry Newman; Dan O'Connor; Isaac Francis Tackman; Story editor: Frances Myers; Breakdown writers: Rick Draughon; Jamey Giddens; Ryan Quan; Katherine Schock; Tyler Topits	Nominated	

Writers Guild of America nominations and awards for Joanna Cohen
Year	Work	Recipients	Result	Ref.
2008	All My Children	Amanda L. Beall; Jeff Beldner; James Harmon Brown; Courtney Bugler; Joanna Cohen; Stephen Demorest; Barbara Esensten; Kate Hall; Chip Hayes; Marla Kanelos; Karen Lewis; Megan McTavish; Michelle Patrick; Rebecca Taylor; Addie Walsh	Nominated	
2010	All My Children	Jeff Beldner; Joanna Cohen; Kate Hall; Chip Hayes; Michelle Patrick; Charles Pratt Jr.; Rebecca Taylor; Tracey Thomson; Addie Walsh	Nominated	
2012	All My Children	Jeff Beldner; Lorraine Broderick; Joanna Cohen; Lisa K. Connor; Chris Dunn; Lucky Gold; Kate Hall; Chip Hayes; David Kreizman; Dave Ryan; Donna Swajeski; Rebecca Taylor; Addie Walsh	Nominated	
2019	Days of Our Lives	Head writer: Ron Carlivati; Writers: Sheri Anderson; Lorraine Broderick; David Cherrill; Joanna Cohen; Lisa Connor; Carolyn Culliton; Richard Culliton; Rick Draughon; Cydney Kelley; David Kreizman; David A. Levinson; Rebecca McCarty; Ryan Quan; Dave Ryan; Katherine Schock; Elizabeth Snyder; Tyler Topits	Nominated	
2020	Days of Our Lives	Lorraine Broderick; Ron Carlivati; Joanna Cohen; Carolyn Culliton; Richard Culliton; Rick Draughon; Dave Kreizman; Rebecca McCarty; Ryan Quan; Dave Ryan; Katie Schock; Betsy Snyder	Nominated	
2021	Days of Our Lives	Head Writer: Ron Carlivati; Writers: Lorraine Broderick; Joanna Cohen; Carolyn Culliton; Richard Culliton; Rick Draughon; David Kreizman; Rebecca McCarty; Ryan Quan; Dave Ryan; Katherine D. Schock; Elizabeth Snyder	Won	
2022	Days of Our Lives	Head Writer: Ron Carlivati; Writers: Lorraine Broderick; Joanna Cohen; Carolyn Culliton; Richard Culliton; Jamey Giddens; David Kreizman; Rebecca McCarty; Ryan Quan; Dave Ryan; Katherine D. Schock; Elizabeth Snyder	Won	
2023	Days of Our Lives	Head writer: Ron Carlivati; Writers: Lorraine Broderick; Jazmen Darnell Brown; Joanna Cohen; Carolyn Culliton; Richard Culliton; Cheryl Davis; Kirk Doering; Christopher Dunn; Jamey Giddens; David Kreizman; Ryan Quan; Dave Ryan; Katherine D. Schock	Won	
2024	Days of Our Lives	Head writer: Ron Carlivati; Creative consultant: Ryan Quan; Writers: Sonja Alar; Jazmen Darnell Brown; Joanna Cohen; Carolyn Culliton; Richard Culliton; Cheryl Davis; Kirk Doering; Christopher Dunn; Jamey Giddens; David Kreizman; Henry Newman; Dave Ryan; Katherine D. Schock	Won	

== Bibliography ==
=== Books ===
- Cohen, Joanna (1997). Baseball Superstars. New York: Sports Illustrated for Kids. ISBN 1-886-74920-5.
- Cohen, Joanna (October 21, 2014). Sweet Child. Amazon. ASIN B00OSHCC48.

=== Select New York Times articles ===
- Cohen, Joanna (November 5, 2010). "So, Runner, What's on Your iPod?". The New York Times. Archived from the original on October 25, 2026.
- Cohen, Joanna (February 4, 2013). "Love and Lessons From the Niners". The New York Times. p. SP9. ProQuest 1815056794. Archived from the original on February 3, 2013.
