= 66th Writers Guild of America Awards =

66th WGA Awards
- Date: February 1, 2014
- Organized by: Writers Guild of America, East and the Writers Guild of America, West

The 66th Writers Guild of America Awards honor the best film, television, radio and video-game writers of 2013. The television and radio nominees were announced on December 5, 2013. Film nominees were announced on January 3, 2014. All winners were announced on February 1, 2014, at the JW Marriott hotel in the L.A. Live entertainment complex.

== Winners and nominees ==
=== Film ===
==== Original ====
Her — Spike Jonze; Warner Bros. Pictures †

- American Hustle — Eric Warren Singer and David O. Russell; Columbia Pictures
- Blue Jasmine — Woody Allen; Sony Picture Classics
- Dallas Buyers Club — Craig Borten and Melisa Wallack; Focus Features
- Nebraska — Bob Nelson; Paramount Pictures

==== Adapted ====
Captain Phillips — Screenplay by Billy Ray, based on the book A Captain's Duty: Somali Pirates, Navy SEALS, and Dangerous Days at Sea by Richard Phillips with Stephan Talty; Columbia Pictures

- August: Osage County — Screenplay by Tracy Letts, based on his play; The Weinstein Company
- Before Midnight — Written by Richard Linklater & Julie Delpy & Ethan Hawke, based on characters created by Richard Linklater & Kim Krizan; Sony Picture Classics
- Lone Survivor — Screenplay by Peter Berg, based on the book by Marcus Lutrell with Patrick Robinson; Universal Pictures
- The Wolf of Wall Street — Screenplay by Terence Winter, based on the memoir by Jordan Belfort; Paramount Pictures

==== Documentary ====
Stories We Tell — Written by Sarah Polley; Roadside Attractions

- Dirty Wars — Written by Jeremy Scahill and David Riker; Sundance Selects
- Herblock – The Black & The White — Written by Sara Lukinson & Michael Stevens; The Stevens Company
- No Place on Earth — Written by Janet Tobias & Paul Laikin; Magnolia Pictures
- We Steal Secrets: The Story of WikiLeaks — Written by Alex Gibney; Focus Features

=== Television ===
==== Drama series ====
Breaking Bad — Sam Catlin, Vince Gilligan, Peter Gould, Gennifer Hutchison, George Mastras, Thomas Schnauz, Moira Walley-Beckett; AMC

- The Good Wife —Meredith Averill, Leonard Dick, Keith Eisner, Jacqueline Hoyt, Ted Humphrey, Michelle King, Robert King, Erica Shelton Kodish, Matthew Montoya, J.C. Nolan, Luke Schelhaas, Nichelle Tramble Spellman, Craig Turk, Julia Wolfe; CBS
- Homeland — Henry Bromell, William E. Bromell, Alexander Cary, Alex Gansa, Howard Gordon, Barbara Hall, Patrick Harbinson, Chip Johannessen, Meredith Stiehm, Charlotte Stoudt, James Yoshimura; Showtime
- House of Cards — Kate Barnow, Rick Cleveland, Sam Forman, Gina Gionfriddo, Keith Huff, Sarah Treem, Beau Willimon; Netflix
- Mad Men — Lisa Albert, Semi Chellas, Jason Grote, Jonathan Igla, Andre Jacquemetton, Maria Jacquemetton, Janet Leahy, Erin Levy, Michael Saltzman, Tom Smuts, Matthew Weiner, Carly Wray; AMC

==== Comedy Series ====
Veep — Simon Blackwell, Roger Drew, Sean Gray, Armando Iannucci, Ian Martin, Georgia Pritchett, David Quantick, Tony Roche, Will Smith; HBO

- 30 Rock — Jack Burditt, Robert Carlock, Tom Ceraulo, Luke Del Tredici, Tina Fey, Lang Fisher, Matt Hubbard, Colleen McGuinness, Sam Means, Dylan Morgan, Nina Pedrad, Josh Siegal, Tracey Wigfield; NBC
- Modern Family — Paul Corrigan, Bianca Douglas, Megan Ganz, Abraham Higginbotham, Ben Karlin, Elaine Ko, Steven Levitan, Christopher Lloyd, Becky Mann, Dan O’Shannon, Jeffrey Richman, Audra Sielaff, Emily Spivey, Brad Walsh, Bill Wrubel, Danny Zuker; ABC
- Orange Is the New Black — Liz Friedman, Sian Heder, Tara Herrmann, Sara Hess, Nick Jones, Jenji Kohan, Gary Lennon, Lauren Morelli, Marco Ramirez; Netflix
- Parks and Recreation — Megan Amram, Donick Cary, Greg Daniels, Nate DiMeo, Emma Fletcher, Rachna Fruchbom, Daniel J. Goor, Norm Hiscock, Matt Hubbard, Dave King, Greg Levine, Joe Mande, Sam Means, Aisha Muharrar, Matt Murray, Amy Poehler, Alexandra Rushfield, Michael Schur, Jen Statsky, Harris Wittels, Alan Yang; NBC

==== New Series ====
House of Cards — Kate Barnow, Rick Cleveland, Sam Forman, Gina Gionfriddo, Keith Huff, Sarah Treem, Beau Willimon; Netflix

- The Americans — Michael Batistick, Joshua Brand, Joel Fields, Melissa James Gibson, Sneha Koorse, Joe Weisberg, Bradford Winters; FX
- Masters of Sex — Michelle Ashford, Tyler Bensinger, Michael Cunningham, Lyn Greene, Richard Levine, Amy Lippman, Sam Shaw, Noelle Valdivia; Showtime
- Orange Is the New Black — Liz Friedman, Sian Heder, Tara Herrmann, Sara Hess, Nick Jones, Jenji Kohan, Gary Lennon, Lauren Morelli, Marco Ramirez; Netflix
- Ray Donovan — Ann Biderman, Sean Conway, David Hollander, Brett Johnson, Ron Nyswaner; Showtime

==== Episodic Drama ====
"Confessions" (Breaking Bad) — Gennifer Hutchison; AMC

- "Buried" (Breaking Bad) — Thomas Schnauz; AMC
- "Chapter 1" (House of Cards) — Beau Willimon; Netflix
- "Granite State" (Breaking Bad) — Peter Gould; AMC
- "Hitting the Fan" (The Good Wife) — Robert King and Michelle King; CBS
- "Pilot" (Masters of Sex) — Michelle Ashford; Showtime

==== Episodic Comedy ====
"Hogcock!" (30 Rock) — Jack Burditt and Robert Carlock; NBC

- "Career Day" (Modern Family) — Paul Corrigan and Brad Walsh; ABC
- "Farm Strong" (Modern Family) — Elaine Ko; ABC
- "I Wasn't Ready" (Orange Is the New Black), Liz Friedman and Jenji Kohan; Netflix
- "Lesbian Request Denied" (Orange Is the New Black), Sian Heder; Netflix
- "Leslie and Ben" (Parks and Recreation), Michael Schur and Alan Yang; NBC

==== Long Form – Adaptation ====
Muhammad Ali's Greatest Fight — Shawn Slovo, based on the book by Howard Bingham and Max Wallace; HBO

- Killing Kennedy — Kelly Masterson, based on the book by Bill O'Reilly and Martin Dugard; National Geographic

==== Animation ====
"A Test Before Trying" (The Simpsons) — Joel H. Cohen; Fox

- "Game of Tones" (Futurama) — Michael Rowe; Comedy Central
- "Hardly Kirk-ing" (The Simpsons) — Tom Gammill and Max Pross; Fox
- "Murder on the Planet Express" (Futurama) — Lew Morton; Comedy Central
- "Saturday Morning Fun Pit" (Futurama) — Patric M. Verrone; Comedy Central
- "YOLO" (The Simpsons) — Michael Nobori; Fox

==== Comedy/Variety (including talk) series ====
The Colbert Report — Stephen Colbert, Tom Purcell, Michael Brumm, Nate Charny, Rich Dahm, Paul Dinello, Eric Drysdale, Rob Dubbin, Glenn Eichler, Dan Guterman, Barry Julien, Jay Katsir, Frank Lesser, Opus Moreschi, Bobby Mort, Meredith Scardino, Max Werner; Comedy Central

- Conan — Jose Arroyo, Andres du Bouchet, Scott Chernoff, Deon Cole, Josh Comers, Dan Cronin, Scott Gairdner, Michael Gordon, Brian Kiley, Laurie Kilmartin, Rob Kutner, Todd Levin, Conan O'Brien, Matt O'Brien, Jesse Popp, Andy Richter, Brian Stack, Mike Sweeney; TBS
- The Daily Show — Rory Albanese, Steve Bodow, Tim Carvell, Travon Free, Hallie Haglund, J.R. Havlan, Elliott Kalan, Matt Koff, Dan McCoy, Jo Miller, John Oliver, Zhubin Parang, Daniel Radosh, Jason Ross, Lauren Sarver, Jon Stewart; Comedy Central
- Jimmy Kimmel Live! — Tony Barbieri, Jonathan Bines, Joelle Boucai, Gary Greenberg, Josh Halloway, Sal Iacono, Eric Immerman, Bess Kalb, Jimmy Kimmel, Jeff Loveness, Molly McNearney, Bryan Paulk, Danny Ricker, Rick Rosner; ABC
- Portlandia — Fred Armisen, Carrie Brownstein, Jonathan Krisel, Bill Oakley; IFC
- Saturday Night Live — Seth Meyers, Colin Jost; Writers: James Anderson, Alex Baze, Neil Casey, James Downey, Steve Higgins, Zach Kanin, Chris Kelly, Joe Kelly, Erik Kenward, Rob Klein, Lorne Michaels, John Mulaney, Mike O’Brien, Josh Patten, Paula Pell, Marika Sawyer, Sarah Schneider, Pete Schultz, John Solomon, Kent Sublette, Bryan Tucker; NBC

==== Comedy/Variety (including music, awards, tributes ) specials ====
- Blake Shelton’s Not So Family Christmas, Head Writers: Jay Martel, Ian Roberts; Writers: Alex Rubens, Charlie Sanders; NBC

==== Daytime Drama ====
Days of Our Lives — Lorraine Broderick, David Cherrill, Carolyn Culliton, Richard Culliton, Rick Draughon, Christopher Dunn, Janet Iacobuzio, David A. Levinson, Ryan Quan, Dave Ryan, Melissa Salmons, Christopher J. Whitesell; NBC

- General Hospital — Shelly Altman, Ron Carlivati, Anna Theresa Cascio, Suzanne Flynn, Kate Hall, Elizabeth Korte, Daniel James O’Connor, Jean Passanante, Elizabeth Page, Katherine Schock, Scott Sickles, Chris Van Etten; ABC
- The Young and the Restless — Associate Head Writers: Shelly Altman, Tracey Thomson; Written by Amanda Beall, Jeff Beldner, Brent Boyd, Susan Dansby, Janice Ferri Esser, Jay Gibson, Beth Milstein, Lisa Seidman, Natalie Minardi Slater, Anne Schoettle, Linda Schreiber, Teresa Zimmerman; CBS

==== Children's - Episodic and Specials ====
"influANTces" (A.N.T. Farm) — Vincent Brown; Disney Channel

- "The Haunted Cave" (Spooksville) — Jim Krieg; Hub Network
- "Simon Says" (Sesame Street) — Christine Ferraro; PBS

==== Documentary – Current Events ====
"Egypt in Crisis" (Frontline) — Marcela Gaviria & Martin Smith; PBS

- "Cliffhanger" (Frontline) — Michael Kirk & Mike Wiser; PBS

==== Documentary – Other than Current Events ====
"The Choice 2012" (Frontline) — Michael Kirk; PBS (tie)
*"Silicon Valley" (American Experience) — Telescript by Randall MacLowry and Michelle Ferrari; Story by Randall MacLowry; PBS (tie)

- "The Abolitionists" (American Experience) — Rob Rapley; PBS
- "Episode 1" (The Dust Bowl) — Dayton Duncan; PBS

==== News – regularly scheduled, bulletin, or breaking report ====
"Tragedy at Newtown" Special Edition (ABC World News with Diane Sawyer) — Lisa Ferri and Matt Negrin; ABC

- "The Election of Pope Francis" (CBS Evening News with Scott Pelley) — Jerry Cipriano, Joe Clines and Scott Pelley; CBS
- "The Fall of Lance Armstrong"(60 Minutes) — Michael Radutzky, Michael Rey, Oriana Zill de Granados; CBS
- "The Inauguration of the President" (CBS Evening News with Scott Pelley) — Jerry Cipriano and Joe Clines; CBS

==== News – analysis, feature, or commentary ====
"Lethal Medicine" (60 Minutes) — Michael Rey, Oriana Zill de Granados, Michael Radutzky; CBS

- "Throwback Thursday – Happy Birthday, Michael Jackson" (ABC World News Now) — Matt Nelko; ABC
- "Vinyl Revival" (CBS News) — Polly Leider; CBS

=== Radio ===
==== Documentary ====
- "2012 Year in Review" — Gail Lee; CBS Radio News

==== News – regularly scheduled or breaking report ====
"Afternoon Drive" — Bill Spadaro; CBS Radio/1010 WINS

- "George McGovern: A Look Back" — Gail Lee; CBS Radio News

==== News – analysis, feature, or commentary ====
"Remembering C. Everett Koop" — Scott Saloway; CBS Radio News

- "Remembrances" — Gail Lee; CBS Radio News
- "Tributes" — Thomas A. Sabella; CBS Radio News

=== Promotional Writing and Graphic Animation ===
==== On-Air Promotion (Radio or Television) ====
"The Crazy Ones – Building a Better Comedy" — Erial Tompkins; CBS

- "48 Hours: 2013 Fall Preview" — Jay Pedinoff; CBS News Marketing

==== Television Graphic Animation ====
"CBS News Animations" — David Rosen; CBS News

=== Video games ===
The Last of Us — Neil Druckmann; Sony Computer Entertainment

- Assassin's Creed IV: Black Flag — Story by Darby McDevitt, Mustapha Mahrach, Jean Guesdon; Lead Scriptwriter Darby McDevitt; Scriptwriter Jill Murray; AI Scriptwriter Nicholas Grimwood; Scriptwriter Singapore Mark Llabres Hill; Ubisoft
- Batman: Arkham Origins — Narrative Director Dooma Wendschuh; Writer & Senior Narrative Designer Ryan Galletta; Writer Corey May; Warner Bros. Interactive
- God of War: Ascension — Marianne Krawczyk; Additional Writing Ariel Lawrence; Sony Computer Entertainment
- Lost Planet 3 — Head Writer Richard Gaubert; Writers Orion Walker, Matt Sophos; Capcom

=== Lifetime Achievement Awards ===
==== Laurel Award for Screenwriting Achievement ====
- Paul Mazursky

==== Laurel Award for TV Writing Achievement ====
- Garry Marshall
