= 65th Writers Guild of America Awards =

65th WGA Awards
- Date: February 17, 2013
- Organized by: Writers Guild of America, East and the Writers Guild of America, West

The 65th Writers Guild of America Awards honor the best film, television, radio and video-game writers of 2012. The television and radio nominees were announced on December 6, 2012. Film nominees were announced on January 4, 2013. All winners were announced on February 17, 2013, at the JW Marriott Hotel in the L.A. Live entertainment complex.

== Winners and nominees ==
=== Film ===
==== Original ====
Zero Dark Thirty — Mark Boal; Columbia Pictures

- Flight — John Gatins; Paramount Pictures
- Looper — Rian Johnson; TriStar Pictures
- The Master — Paul Thomas Anderson; The Weinstein Company
- Moonrise Kingdom — Wes Anderson and Roman Coppola; Focus Features

==== Adapted ====
Argo — Screenplay by Chris Terrio, based on a selection from The Master of Disguise by Tony Mendez and the Wired magazine article "The Great Escape" by Joshuah Bearman; Warner Bros. Pictures †

- Life of Pi — Screenplay by David Magee, based on the novel by Yann Martel; 20th Century Fox
- Lincoln — Screenplay by Tony Kushner, based in part on the book Team of Rivals: The Political Genius of Abraham Lincoln by Doris Kearns Goodwin; DreamWorks Pictures, 20th Century Fox, and Touchstone Pictures
- The Perks of Being a Wallflower — Screenplay by Stephen Chbosky, based on his novel; Summit Entertainment
- Silver Linings Playbook — Screenplay by David O. Russell, based on the novel by Matthew Quick; The Weinstein Company

==== Documentary ====
Searching for Sugar Man — Malik Bendjelloul; Sony Pictures Classics

- The Central Park Five — Sarah Burns, David McMahon and Ken Burns; Sundance Selects
- The Invisible War — Kirby Dick; Cinedigm Entertainment Group
- Mea Maxima Culpa: Silence in the House of God — Alex Gibney; HBO Films
- We Are Legion — Brian Knappenberger; Cinetic Media
- West of Memphis — Amy J. Berg and Billy McMillin; Sony Pictures Classics

=== Television ===
==== Drama series ====
Breaking Bad — Sam Catlin, Vince Gilligan, Peter Gould, Gennifer Hutchison, George Mastras, Thomas Schnauz, Moira Walley-Beckett; AMC

- Boardwalk Empire — Dave Flebotte, Diane Frolov, Chris Haddock, Rolin Jones, Howard Korder, Steve Kornacki, Andrew Schneider, David Stenn, Terence Winter; HBO
- Game of Thrones — David Benioff, Bryan Cogman, Jane Espenson, George R. R. Martin, D. B. Weiss; HBO
- Homeland — Henry Bromell, Alexander Cary, Alex Gansa, Howard Gordon, Chip Johannessen, Gideon Raff, Meredith Stiehm; Showtime
- Mad Men — Lisa Albert, Semi Chellas, Jason Grote, Jonathan Igla, Andre Jacquemetton, Maria Jacquemetton, Brett Johnson, Janet Leahy, Victor Levin, Erin Levy, Frank Pierson, Michael Saltzman, Tom Smuts, Matthew Weiner; AMC

==== Comedy Series ====
Louie — Pamela Adlon, Vernon Chatman, Louis C.K.; FX

- 30 Rock — Jack Burditt, Kay Cannon, Robert Carlock, Tom Ceraulo, Vali Chandrasekaran, Luke Del Tredici, Tina Fey, Lauren Gurganous, Matt Hubbard, Colleen McGuinness, Sam Means, Dylan Morgan, Nina Pedrad, John Riggi, Josh Siegel, Ron Weiner, Tracey Wigfield; NBC
- Girls — Judd Apatow, Lesley Arfin, Lena Dunham, Sarah Heyward, Bruce Eric Kaplan, Jenni Konner, Deborah Schoeneman, Dan Sterling; HBO
- Modern Family — Cindy Chupack, Paul Corrigan, Abraham Higginbotham, Ben Karlin, Elaine Ko, Steven Levitan, Christopher Lloyd, Dan O’Shannon, Jeffrey Richman, Audra Sielaff, Brad Walsh, Bill Wrubel, Danny Zuker; ABC
- Parks and Recreation — Megan Amram, Greg Daniels, Nate Dimeo, Katie Dippold, Daniel J. Goor, Norm Hiscock, Dave King, Greg Levine, Joe Mande, Aisha Muharrar, Nick Offerman, Chelsea Peretti, Amy Poehler, Alexandra Rushfield, Mike Scully, Michael Schur, Harris Wittels, Alan Yang; NBC

==== New Series ====
Girls — Judd Apatow, Lesley Arfin, Lena Dunham, Sarah Heyward, Bruce Eric Kaplan, Jenni Konner, Deborah Schoeneman, Dan Sterling; HBO

- The Mindy Project — Ike Barinholtz, Jeremy Bronson, Linwood Boomer, Adam Countee, Harper Dill, Mindy Kaling, Chris McKenna, B.J. Novak, David Stassen, Matt Warburton; Fox
- Nashville — Wendy Calhoun, Jason George, David Gould, David Marshall Grant, Dee Johnson, Todd Ellis Kessler, Callie Khouri, Meredith Lavender, Nancy Miller, James Parriott, Liz Tigelaar, Marcie Ulin; ABC
- The Newsroom — Brendan Fehily, David Handelman, Cinque Henderson, Paul Redford, Ian Reichbach, Amy Rice, Aaron Sorkin, Gideon Yago; HBO
- Veep — Jesse Armstrong, Simon Blackwell, Roger Drew, Sean Gray, Armando Iannucci, Ian Martin, Tony Roche, Will Smith; HBO

==== Episodic Drama ====
"The Other Woman" (Mad Men) — Semi Chellas and Matthew Weiner; AMC

- "Buyout" (Breaking Bad) — Gennifer Hutchison; AMC
- "Dead Freight" (Breaking Bad) — George Mastras; AMC
- "Fifty-One" (Breaking Bad) — Sam Catlin; AMC
- "Say My Name" (Breaking Bad) — Thomas Schnauz; AMC
- "New Car Smell" (Homeland) — Meredith Stiehm; Showtime

==== Episodic Comedy ====
"Virgin Territory" (Modern Family) — Elaine Ko; ABC

- "The Debate" (Parks and Recreation) — Amy Poehler; NBC
- "Episode Nine" (Episodes) — David Crane and Jeffrey Klarik; Showtime
- "Leap Day" (30 Rock) — Luke Del Tredici; NBC
- "Little Bo Bleep" (Modern Family) — Cindy Chupack; ABC
- "Mistery Date" (Modern Family) — Jeffrey Richman; ABC

==== Long Form – Original ====
Hatfields & McCoys, Nights Two and Three — Teleplay by Ted Mann and Ronald Parker, story by Bill Kerby and Ted Mann; History Channel

- Hemingway & Gellhorn — Jerry Stahl and Barbara Turner; HBO
- Political Animals, Pilot — Greg Berlanti; USA

==== Long Form – Adaptation ====
Game Change — Danny Strong, based on the book by Mark Halperin and John Heilemann; HBO

- Coma, Nights 1 and 2 — Teleplay by John McLaughlin, based on the book by Robin Cook; A&E

==== Animation ====
"Ned 'n' Edna's Blend Agenda" (The Simpsons) — Jeff Westbrook; Fox

- "A Farewell to Arms" (Futurama) — Josh Weinstein; Comedy Central
- "Forget-Me-Not" (Family Guy) — David A. Goodman; Fox
- "Holidays of Future Passed" (The Simpsons) — J. Stewart Burns; Fox
- "Treehouse of Horror XXIII" (The Simpsons) — David Mandel & Brian Kelley; FOX

==== Comedy/Variety (including talk) series ====
Portlandia — Fred Armisen, Carrie Brownstein, Karey Dornetto, Jonathan Krisel, Bill Oakley; IFC

- The Colbert Report — Michael Brumm, Stephen Colbert, Rich Dahm, Paul Dinello, Eric Drysdale, Rob Dubbin, Glenn Eichler, Dan Guterman, Peter Gwinn, Barry Julien, Jay Katsir, Frank Lesser, Opus Moreschi, Tom Purcell, Meredith Scardino, Scott Sherman, Max Werner; Comedy Central
- Conan — Jose Arroyo, Andres du Bouchet, Deon Cole, Josh Comers, Dan Cronin, Michael Gordon, Brian Kiley, Laurie Kilmartin, Rob Kutner, Todd Levin, Brian McCann, Conan O'Brien, Matt O'Brien, Jesse Popp, Andy Richter, Brian Stack, Mike Sweeney; TBS
- The Daily Show — Rory Albanese, Kevin Bleyer, Richard Blomquist, Steve Bodow, Tim Carvell, Hallie Haglund, J.R. Havlan, Elliott Kalan, Dan McCoy, Jo Miller, John Oliver, Zhubin Parang, Daniel Radosh, Jason Ross, Lauren Sarver, Jon Stewart; Comedy Central
- Jimmy Kimmel Live! — Tony Barbieri, Jonathan Bines, Joelle Boucai, Sal Iacono, Eric Immerman, Gary Greenberg, Josh Halloway, Bess Kalb, Jimmy Kimmel, Jeff Loveness, Molly McNearney, Bryan Paulk, Danny Ricker, Rick Rosner; ABC
- Key & Peele — Jay Martel, Ian Roberts, Keegan-Michael Key, Jordan Peele, Sean Conroy, Colton Dunn, Charlie Sanders, Alex Rubens, Rebecca Drysdale; Comedy Central
- Real Time with Bill Maher — Scott Carter, Adam Felber, Matt Gunn, Brian Jacobsmeyer, Jay Jaroch, Chris Kelly, Mike Larsen, Bill Maher, Billy Martin; HBO
- Saturday Night Live — Seth Meyers, Writers: James Anderson, Alex Baze, Neil Casey, Jessica Conrad, James Downey, Shelly Gossman, Steve Higgins, Colin Jost, Zach Kanin, Chris Kelly, Joe Kelly, Erik Kenward, Rob Klein, Lorne Michaels, John Mulaney, Christine Nangle, Mike O’Brien, Josh Patten, Paula Pell, Marika Sawyer, Sarah Schneider, Pete Schultz, John Solomon, Kent Sublette, Bryan Tucker, Emily Spivey, Jorma Taccone, Frank Sebastiano; NBC

==== Comedy/Variety (including music, awards, tributes ) specials ====
66th Tony Awards — Written by Dave Boone; Special Material by Paul Greenberg; Opening and Closing Songs by David Javerbaum, Adam Schlesinger; CBS

- 27th Independent Spirit Awards — Billy Kimball, Wayne Federman; IFC
- After the Academy Awards — Gary Greenberg, Molly McNearney, Tony Barbieri, Jonathan Bines, Sal Iacono, Eric Immerman, Jimmy Kimmel, Jeffrey Loveness, Bryan Paulk, Danny Ricker, Richard G. Rosner; ABC
- National Memorial Day Concert — Joan Meyerson; PBS

==== Daytime Drama ====
The Young and the Restless — Amanda Beall, Jeff Beldner, Susan Dansby, Janice Ferri Esser, Jay Gibson, Scott Hamner, Marla Kanelos, Natalie Minardi Slater, Beth Milstein, Michael Montgomery, Anne Schoettle, Linda Schreiber, Sarah K. Smith, Christopher J. Whitesell, Teresa Zimmerman; CBS

- Days of Our Lives — Lorraine Broderick, Carolyn Culliton, Richard Culliton, Rick Draughon, Christopher Dunn, Lacey Dyer, Janet Iacobuzio, David A. Levinson, Ryan Quan, Dave Ryan, Melissa Salmons, Roger Schroeder, Elizabeth Snyder, Christopher J. Whitesell, Nancy Williams Watt; NBC
- One Life to Live — Lorraine Broderick, Ron Carlivati, Anna Theresa Cascio, Daniel J. O'Connor, Elizabeth Page, Jean Passanante, Melissa Salmons, Katherine Schock, Scott Sickles, Courtney Simon, Chris Van Etten; ABC

==== Children's - Episodic and Specials ====
"The Good Sport" (Sesame Street) — Christine Ferraro; PBS

==== Children's - Long Form or Special ====
Girl vs. Monster — Story by Annie DeYoung, Teleplay by Annie DeYoung and Ron McGee; Disney Channel

==== Documentary – Current Events ====
"Money, Power and Wall Street: Episode One" (Frontline) — Martin Smith and Marcela Gaviria; PBS

- "The Anthrax Files" (Frontline) — Michael Kirk; PBS
- "Lost in Detention" (Frontline) — Rick Young; PBS
- "Money, Power and Wall Street: Episode Three" (Frontline) — Michael Kirk & Mike Wiser; PBS
- "Money, Power and Wall Street: Episode Four" (Frontline) — Marcela Gaviria and Martin Smith; PBS
- "A Perfect Terrorist" (Frontline) — Thomas Jennings; PBS

==== Documentary – Other than Current Events ====
"The Fabric of the Cosmos: The Illusion of Time" (Nova) — Telescript by Randall MacLowry, story by Joseph McMaster and Randall MacLowry; PBS

- "The Amish" (American Experience) — David Belton; PBS
- "Clinton" (American Experience) — Barak Goodman; PBS
- "Death and the Civil War" (American Experience) — Ric Burns; PBS
- "The Fabric of the Cosmos: Quantum Leap" (Nova) — Telescript by Josh Rosen and Julia Cort, story by Joseph McMaster and Josh Rosen; PBS
- "Johnny Carson: King of Late Night" (American Masters) — Peter T. Jones; PBS

==== News – regularly scheduled, bulletin, or breaking report ====
"Tragedy In Colorado: The Movie Theatre Massacre" (ABC News) — Lisa Ferri, Joel Siegel; ABC

==== News – analysis, feature, or commentary ====
"The Ghost of Joe McCarthy" (Moyers & Company) — Bill Moyers, Michael Winship; Thirteen/WNET

- "Making History at Ole Miss" (CBS News) — Polly Leider; CBS
- "The Regime Responds" (Frontline) — Marcela Gaviria; PBS
- "Stem Cell Fraud" (60 Minutes) — Scott Pelley, Michael Rey and Oriana Zill de Granados, CBS

=== Radio ===
==== News – regularly scheduled or breaking report ====
"World News This Year 2011" — Darren Reynolds; ABC News Radio

- "CBS Radio News" — Duane Tollison; CBS Radio News
- "Local and National News" — Mark Hugh Miller; CBS Radio News
- "Remembering Andy Williams" — Arlene Lebe; CBS Radio News

==== News – analysis, feature, or commentary ====
"Dishin Digital" — Robert Hawley; WCBS-AM

- "Pre-existing Conditions and the Affordable Care Act" — Scott J. Saloway; CBS Radio News
- "Tributes" — Gail Lee, CBS Radio News

=== Promotional Writing and Graphic Animation ===
==== On-Air Promotion (Radio or Television) ====
"Partners" — Dan A. Greenberger; CBS

==== Television Graphic Animation ====
"The Oscars" (CBS News Sunday Morning) — Bob Pook; CBS

- "CBS News Animations" — David Rosen; CBS News
