= 67th Writers Guild of America Awards =

67th WGA Awards
- Date: February 14, 2015
- Organized by: Writers Guild of America, East and the Writers Guild of America, West

The 67th Writers Guild of America Awards honor the best film, television, radio and video-game writers of 2014. The nominations for television, new media, and radio categories were announced on December 4, 2014. The nominations for original, adapted, and documentary screenplay nominations were announced on January 7, 2015. The winners were announced in simultaneous ceremonies in Los Angeles and New York on February 14, 2015.

== Winners and nominees ==
=== Film ===
Best Original Screenplay
- The Grand Budapest Hotel (Fox Searchlight Pictures) – Wes Anderson; story by Wes Anderson & Hugo Guinness
  - Boyhood (IFC Films) – Richard Linklater
  - Foxcatcher (Sony Pictures Classics) – E. Max Frye and Dan Futterman
  - Nightcrawler (Open Road Films) – Dan Gilroy
  - Whiplash (Sony Pictures Classics) – Damien Chazelle
Best Adapted Screenplay
- The Imitation Game (The Weinstein Company) – Graham Moore; based on the book, Alan Turing: The Enigma, by Andrew Hodges †
  - American Sniper (Warner Bros.) – Jason Dean Hall; based on the book by Chris Kyle with Scott McEwen and Jim DeFelice
  - Gone Girl (20th Century Fox) – Gillian Flynn; based on her novel
  - Guardians of the Galaxy (Walt Disney Studios Motion Pictures) – James Gunn and Nicole Perlman; based on the Marvel comic by Dan Abnett and Andy Lanning
  - Wild (Fox Searchlight Pictures) – Nick Hornby; based on the book by Cheryl Strayed
Best Documentary Screenplay
- The Internet's Own Boy: The Story of Aaron Swartz (FilmBuff) – Brian Knappenberger
  - Finding Vivian Maier (Sundance Selects) – John Maloof & Charlie Siskel
  - Last Days in Vietnam (American Experience Films) – Mark Bailey & Kevin McAlester
  - Red Army (Sony Pictures Classics) – Gabe Polsky

=== Television ===
Drama Series
- True Detective (HBO) – Nic Pizzolatto
  - Game of Thrones (HBO) – David Benioff, Bryan Cogman, George R. R. Martin, D. B. Weiss
  - The Good Wife (CBS) – Leonard Dick, Keith Eisner, Ted Humphrey, Michelle King, Robert King, Erica Shelton Kodish, Matthew Montoya, Luke Schelhaas, Nichelle Tramble Spellman, Craig Turk, Julia Wolfe
  - House of Cards (Netflix) – Bill Cain, Laura Eason, Sam R. Forman, William Kennedy, Kenneth Lin, John Mankiewicz, David Manson, Beau Willimon
  - Mad Men (AMC) – Lisa Albert, Heather Jeng Bladt, Semi Chellas, Jonathan Igla, David Iserson, Janet Leahy, Erin Levy, Patricia Resnick, Tom Smuts, Matthew Weiner, Carly Wray
Comedy Series
- Louie (FX) – Pamela Adlon, Louis C.K.
  - Orange Is the New Black (Netflix) – Stephen Falk, Sian Heder, Tara Herrmann, Sara Hess, Nick Jones, Jenji Kohan, Lauren Morelli, Alex Regnery, Hartley Voss
  - Silicon Valley (HBO) – John Altschuler, Alec Berg, Matteo Borghese, Jessica Gao, Mike Judge, Dave Krinsky, Carson Mell, Dan O'Keefe, Clay Tarver, Rob Turbovsky, Ron Weiner
  - Transparent (Amazon) – Bridget Bedard, Micah Fitzerman-Blue, Noah Harpster, Ethan Kuperberg, Ali Liebegott, Faith Soloway, Jill Soloway
  - Veep (HBO) – Simon Blackwell, Kevin Cecil, Roger Drew, Sean Gray, Armando Iannucci, Ian Martin, Georgia Pritchett, David Quantick, Andy Riley, Tony Roche, Will Smith
New Series
- True Detective (HBO) – Nic Pizzolatto
  - The Affair (Showtime) – Dan LeFranc, Hagai Levi, Melanie Marnich, Eric Overmyer, Kate Robin, Sarah Treem
  - The Knick (Cinemax) – Jack Amiel, Michael Begler, Steven Katz
  - Silicon Valley (HBO) – John Altschuler, Alec Berg, Matteo Borghese, Jessica Gao, Mike Judge, Dave Krinsky, Carson Mell, Dan O'Keefe, Clay Tarver, Rob Turbovsky, Ron Weiner
  - Transparent (Amazon) – Bridget Bedard, Micah Fitzerman-Blue, Noah Harpster, Ethan Kuperberg, Ali Liebegott, Faith Soloway, Jill Soloway
Long Form Original
- Deliverance Creek (Lifetime) – Melissa Carter
  - Return to Zero (Lifetime) – Sean Hanish
Long Form Adapted
- Olive Kitteridge (HBO) – Jane Anderson, based on the novel by Elizabeth Strout
  - Houdini (History) – Nicholas Meyer, based on the book, Houdini: A Mind in Chains: A Psychoanalytic Portrait, by Bernard C. Meyer, M.D.
  - Klondike (Discovery Channel)– Paul T. Scheuring, Josh Goldin & Rachel Abramowitz, based on the book, Gold Diggers, by Charlotte Gray
  - The Normal Heart (HBO) – Larry Kramer, based on his play, The Normal Heart
  - "Pilot" – The Leftovers (HBO) – Damon Lindelof & Tom Perrotta, based on the book by Tom Perrotta
Short Form New Media – Original
- "Episode 113: Rachel" – High Maintenance – Katja Blichfeld & Ben Sinclair
  - "Apocalypse No" – Bad Shorts – Ben Zelevansky
  - "City of Angles" – Caper (Hulu) – Amy Berg & Mike Sizemore
  - "Episode 1 – Nurture" – F To 7th – Ingrid Jungermann
  - "Episode 204" – Vicky and Lysander – Damon Cardasis and Shannon Walker
  - "Episode 207" – Vicky and Lysander – Damon Cardasis and Shannon Walker
Animation
- "Brick Like Me" – The Simpsons (Fox) – Brian Kelley
  - "Bob and Deliver" – Bob's Burgers (Fox) – Greg Thompson
  - "Covercraft" – The Simpsons (Fox) – Matt Selman
  - "Pay Pal" – The Simpsons (Fox) – David H. Steinberg
  - "Steal This Episode" – The Simpsons (Fox) – J. Stewart Burns
  - "Work Hard or Die Trying, Girl" – Bob’s Burgers (Fox) – Nora Smith
Episodic Drama
- "The Last Call" – The Good Wife (CBS) – Robert King & Michelle King
  - "A Day’s Work" – Mad Men (AMC) – Jonathan Igla and Matthew Weiner
  - "Devil You Know" – Boardwalk Empire (HBO) – Howard Korder
  - "Donald the Normal" – Rectify (SundanceTV) – Kate Powers & Ray McKinnon
  - "Friendless Child" – Boardwalk Empire (HBO) – Riccardo DiLoreto & Cristine Chambers and Howard Korder
  - "The Lion and the Rose" – Game of Thrones (HBO) – George R. R. Martin
Episodic Comedy
- "So Did the Fat Lady" – Louie (FX) – Louis C.K.
  - "The Cold" – Modern Family (ABC) – Rick Wiener & Kenny Schwartz
  - "Landline" – New Girl (Fox) – Rob Rosell
  - "Low Self Esteem City" – Orange Is the New Black (Netflix) – Nick Jones
  - "Three Dinners" – Modern Family (ABC) – Abraham Higginbotham & Steven Levitan & Jeffrey Richman
  - "The Wilderness" – Transparent (Amazon) – Written by Ethan Kuperberg
Comedy/Variety (including Talk) – Series
- Last Week Tonight with John Oliver (HBO) – Kevin Avery, Tim Carvell, Dan Gurewitch, Geoff Haggerty, Jeff Maurer, John Oliver, Scott Sherman, Will Tracy, Jill Twiss, Juli Weiner
  - The Daily Show with Jon Stewart (Comedy Central) – Rory Albanese, Dan Amira, Steve Bodow, Tim Carvell, Travon Free, Hallie Haglund, JR Havlan, Elliott Kalan, Matt Koff, Adam Lowitt, Dan McCoy, Jo Miller, John Oliver, Zhubin Parang, Owen Parsons, Daniel Radosh, Lauren Sarver, Jon Stewart, Delaney Yeager
  - Inside Amy Schumer (Comedy Central) – Jessi Klein, Emily Altman, Jeremy Beiler, Neil Casey, Kyle Dunnigan, Kurt Metzger, Christine Nangle, Dan Powell, Amy Schumer
  - The Colbert Report (Comedy Central) – Michael Brumm, Nate Charny, Aaron Cohen, Stephen Colbert, Rich Dahm, Paul Dinello, Eric Drysdale, Rob Dubbin, Ariel Dumas, Glenn Eichler, Gabe Gronli, Barry Julien, Jay Katsir, Sam Kim, Matt Lappin, Opus Moreschi, Tom Purcell, Meredith Scardino, Max Werner
  - Jimmy Kimmel Live! (ABC) – Molly McNearney, Danny Ricker, Gary Greenberg, Jack Allison, Tony Barbieri, Jonathan Bines, Joelle Boucai, Josh Halloway, Sal Iacono, Eric Immerman, Bess Kalb, Jimmy Kimmel, Jeff Loveness, Bryan Paulk, Rick Rosner, Bridger Winegar
  - Saturday Night Live (NBC) – Seth Meyers, Colin Jost, Rob Klein, Bryan Tucker, James Anderson, Alex Baze, Michael Che, Mikey Day, Steve Higgins, Leslie Jones, Zach Kanin, Chris Kelly, Erik Kenward, Lorne Michaels, Claire Mulaney, Josh Patten, Paula Pell, Katie Rich, Tim Robinson, Sarah Schneider, Pete Schultz, John Solomon, Kent Sublette, LaKendra Tookes
  - Real Time with Bill Maher (HBO) – Billy Martin, Scott Carter, Adam Felber, Matt Gunn, Brian Jacobsmeyer, Jay Jaroch, Chris Kelly, Bill Maher, Danny Vermont
Comedy/Variety (Music, Awards, Tributes) – Specials
- 71st Golden Globe Awards (NBC) – Barry Adelman; special material by Alex Baze, Dave Boone, Robert Carlock, Tina Fey, Jon Macks, Sam Means, Seth Meyers, Amy Poehler, Mike Shoemaker
  - 68th Tony Awards (CBS) – Dave Boone; special material by Jon Macks
  - 2014 Film Independent Spirit Awards (IFC) – Gerry Duggan, Wayne Federman, Patton Oswalt, Erik Weiner
  - Bill Maher: Live from D.C. (HBO) – Bill Maher
  - Sarah Silverman: We Are Miracles (HBO) – Sarah Silverman
Quiz and Audience Participation
- Hollywood Game Night (NBC) – Grant Taylor; Alex Chauvin, Ann Slichter
  - Jeopardy! (ABC) – John Duarte, Harry Friedman, Mark Gaberman, Debbie Griffin, Michele Loud, Robert McClenaghan, Jim Rhine, Steve D. Tamerius, Billy Wisse
Daytime Drama
- General Hospital (ABC) – Ron Carlivati, Anna Theresa Cascio, Suzanne Flynn, Kate Hall, Elizabeth Korte, Daniel James O'Connor, Elizabeth Page, Katherine Schock, Scott Sickles, Chris Van Etten
  - Days of Our Lives (NBC) – Lorraine Broderick, David Cherrill, Carolyn Culliton, Richard Culliton, Rick Draughon, Christopher Dunn, Janet Iacobuzio, Ryan Quan, Dave Ryan, Melissa Salmons, Christopher Whitesell
Children's Script – Episodic and Specials
- "Haunted Heartthrob" – The Haunted Hathaways (Nickelodeon) – Bob Smiley
  - "Girl Meets 1961" – Girl Meets World (Disney Channel) – Matthew Nelson
  - "Haunted Sisters" – The Haunted Hathaways (Nickelodeon) – Boyce Bugliari & Jamie McLaughlin
Documentary Script – Current Events
- "United States of Secrets: The Program (Part One)" – Frontline (PBS) – Michael Kirk & Mike Wiser
  - "Losing Iraq" – Frontline (PBS) – Michael Kirk & Mike Wiser
  - "United States of Secrets: Privacy Lost (Part Two)" – Frontline (PBS) – Martin Smith
Documentary Script – Other than Current Events
- "League of Denial: The NFL's Concussion Crisis" – Frontline (PBS) – Michael Kirk & Mike Wiser
  - "Episode Five: The Rising Road (1933–1939)" – The Roosevelts: An Intimate History (PBS) – Geoffrey C. Ward
  - "Standing Up in the Milky Way" – Cosmos: A Spacetime Odyssey (Fox) – Ann Druyan and Steven Soter
TV News Script – Regularly Scheduled, Bulletin, or Breaking Report
- "Nelson Mandela: A Man Who Changed the World" – World News with Diane Sawyer (ABC News) – Diane Sawyer, Lisa Ferri, Dave Bloch
  - "50th Anniversary of JFK’s Assassination" – CBS Evening News with Scott Pelley (CBS News) – Jerry Cipriano, Joe Clines
  - CBS This Morning (CBS News) – Duane Tollison, Chip Sorrentino, Bruce Meyer, Bill Crowley
TV News Script – Analysis, Feature, or Commentary
- "Nowhere to Go" – 60 Minutes (CBS) – Scott Pelley, Oriana Zill de Granados & Michael Rey

=== Radio ===
Radio Documentary
- "Three Shots Rang Out: The JFK Assassination 50 Years Later," (ABC News Radio) – Darren Reynolds
Radio News Script – Regularly Scheduled, Bulletin, or Breaking Report
- "World News This Week" (ABC News Radio) – Andrew Evans
  - "6AM News" (1010 WINS Radio) – Philip Pilato
  - "8PM Hour" (WCBS-AM – Robert Hawley
  - "New York City Loses a Radio News Legend" (CBS Radio/1010 WINS) – Bill Spadaro
Radio News Script – Analysis, Feature, or Commentary
- "Civil Rights at 50" (WCBS-AM) – Jane Tillman Irving
  - "Remembering Nelson Mandela" (CBS Radio News) – Gail Lee

=== Promotional Writing ===
On-Air Promotion – Television, New Media, or Radio
- "How I Met Your Mother" (CBS) – Dan Greenberger
  - "WABC-TV On-Air Promos" (WABC-TV) – Brandon Nelson

=== Videogames ===
Outstanding Achievement in Videogame Writing
- The Last of Us: Left Behind (Sony Computer Entertainment) – Neil Druckmann
  - Alien: Isolation (SEGA) – Dan Abnett, Dion Lay, Will Porter
  - Assassin's Creed: Freedom Cry (Ubisoft) – Lead Scriptwriter Jill Murray; Scriptwriter Melissa MacCoubrey; Story by Jill Murray, Hugo Giard, Wesley Pincombe
  - Assassin's Creed: Unity (Ubisoft) – Story by Alexandre Amancio, Sylvain Bernard, Travis Stout; Scriptwriting Alexandre Amancio, Travis Stout, Russell Lees, Darby McDevitt, Ceri Young; Additional Scriptwriting Jeffrey Yohalem
