= Michelle Patrick =

American screenwriter

Michelle Patrick (born November 20, 1949) is an African-American television soap opera writer.

== Positions held ==
All My Children

- Associate Head Writer (2005 - 2007)
- Script Writer (1990 - 1998; 2007 - 2009)

General Hospital (hired by Robert Guza Jr.)

- Associate Head Writer Writer (2001 - 2005)
- Script Writer (1998 - 2001)

== Awards and nominations ==
Daytime Emmy Award

- Nomination, 2000, 2003, 2004, 2005, Best Writing, General Hospital
- Won, 2003, Best Writing, General Hospital
- Nomination, 1991-1993, 1995-1999, Best Writing, All My Children
- Won, 1998, Best Writing, All My Children
- Won, 1997, Best Writing, All My Children
- Won, 1996, Best Writing, All My Children

Writers Guild of America Award

- Nomination, 2006, Best Writing, All My Children
- Win, 1998, Best Writing, All My Children
- Nomination, 1997, Best Writing, All My Children
- Win, 1996, Best Writing, All My Children
- Nomination, 1995, Best Writing, All My Children
- Nomination, 1993, Best Writing, All My Children
- Nomination, 1991, Best Writing, All My Children
