= Charlotte Gibson =

American television soap opera writer

- Education: New York University (MFA)

Charlotte Gibson is an American television soap opera writer. Gibson was hired as a breakdown writer on Days of Our Lives by Hogan Sheffer. She attended New York University's Graduate Acting Program at the Tisch School of the Arts, graduating in 1990.

== Positions held ==
All My Children

- Script writer (1997 – 2001)

As the World Turns

- Breakdown writer, headwriting team (2002 – 2005)

Days of Our Lives

- Breakdown writer (2007 – 2008)

General Hospital

- Script writer (2016 – present)

Guiding Light (hired by David Kreizman)

- Breakdown writer, headwriting team (2005 – 2006)

== Awards and nominations ==
Daytime Emmy Award

- Win, 2007, Best Writing, Guiding Light
- Nomination, 2003-2006, Best Writing, As the World Turns
- Wins, 2004 & 2005, Best Writing, As the World Turns
- Nomination, 1998, 1999, 2001 & 2002, Best Writing, All My Children
- Win, 1998, Best Writing, All My Children

Writers Guild of America Award

- Win, 2006, Best Writing, As the World Turns
- Nomination, 2006, Best Writing, Guiding Light
- Nomination, 2005, Best Writing, As the World Turns
- Win, 2001, Best Writing, All My Children
- Win, 2000, Best Writing, All My Children
- Nomination, 1999, Best Writing, All My Children
- Win, 1998, Best Writing, All My Children
- Nomination, 1997, Best Writing, All My Children
