= Josh Griffith =

American soap opera writer and producer

Joe Shelby "Josh" Griffith (born August 15, 19??) is an American soap opera writer and producer.

== Personal life ==
Born on August 15, in New York, Josh is the son of Joe (Rip) Griffith and Sue Estes Griffith, both teachers and artists.

== Career ==
Griffith began his writing career on Santa Barbara in 1988 and continued writing for the show until 1991 when he moved over to One Life to Live, where he began as an associate head writer under Michael Malone before being promoted to co-head writer in early 1992. Under his and Malone's tenure at One Life to Live, the show won a Daytime Emmy Award for Outstanding Writing in 1994. Griffith left the show in early 1995. After that, he co-created with Michael Malone, the soap 13 Bourbon Street for Fox, but it never aired.

In 1997, Griffith was co-creator of the NBC Daytime soap opera Sunset Beach along with Robert Guza Jr. The show ran for nearly three years before being cancelled in December 1999. In the spring of 2003, Griffith and Michael Malone returned to One Life to Live for a second stint as head writers, however they remained with the show for just a year. After leaving, Griffith became a script writer on CBS Daytime's As the World Turns under head writer Hogan Sheffer, who shortly afterwards stepped down as head writer. He would later return to the show briefly between 2009 and 2010.

In 2006, vice president of CBS Daytime, Barbara Bloom, brought Griffith over to The Young and the Restless as a creative consultant and breakdown writer under executive producer and head writer Lynn Marie Latham; within three months, he was promoted to co-executive producer to work alongside of Latham.

Griffith assumed full executive producer duties after Latham was fired for joining the 2007-2008 Writers Guild of America strike. During the strike, Griffith became a strikebreaker, adopting financial core status so that he could work while Guild members were on strike.

In December 2007, Maria Arena Bell became his co-head writer.

In August 2008, Griffith was fired from his executive producer duties by Barbara Bloom and Steven Kent of Sony Pictures Television, leading to Bell becoming executive producer and head writer and later replacing him with Paul Rauch. In 2009, Griffith briefly worked as a writer on General Hospital. In July 2012, it was announced that Griffith had been rehired on The Young and the Restless as the sole head writer following Bell's dismissal; he would work alongside new executive producer Jill Farren Phelps. Episodes under their direction began airing on October 12, 2012.

In August 2013, speculation and reports indicated that Griffith had resigned as head writer, reportedly due to "creative differences" with Phelps. Further speculation adds that Shelly Altman may take over as the new head writer, alongside Tracey Thomson or Jean Passanante may be brought aboard as a new co-head writer. In February 2015, Griffith was hired as co-head writer of Days of Our Lives, alongside re-hired former head, Dena Higley. Griffith began his role as co-head scribe on February 16, 2015, with the material airing on August 19, 2015.

In February 2016, it was reported that Griffith would be departing Days of Our Lives as co-head writer, with Ryan Quan serving as his replacement. Griffith's last episode aired on September 2, 2016.

In August 2018, it was reported that Griffith would be returning to The Young and the Restless this time as supervising producer. Griffith's first episode as supervising producer aired on September 14, 2018.

In December 2018, Daytime Confidential reported that Griffith would once again act as The Young and the Restless's Head Writer following the departure of Mal Young.

Griffith, formerly a member of Writers Guild of America, East, left and maintained financial core status during the 2007–08 Writers Guild of America strike.

== Positions held ==
As the World Turns (hired by Hogan Sheffer)

- Script Writer: 2005 – 2006; 2009 – 2010

Days of Our Lives

- Co-Head Writer: 2015 – 2016

General Hospital (hired by Brian Frons; fired by Robert Guza, Jr.)

- Story Consultant: 2009 – 2009
- Breakdown Writer: 2009
- Script Writer: 2009

One Life to Live

- Associate Head Writer: 1991–1994, 2004
- Co-Head Writer: 1992 – 1995, 2003 – 2004
- Head Writer: 2003 – 2003

Santa Barbara

- Breakdown Writer: 1988–1991
- Script Writer: 1988–1991

Sunset Beach

- Co-Creator: (with Robert Guza, Jr.) 1997

The Young and the Restless (hired by Barbara Bloom)

- Breakdown Writer: 2006
- Creative Consultant: 2006
- Co-Executive Producer: 2006 – 2007; 2019 – 2023
- Head writer: 2007 – 2008; 2012 – 2013; 2019 – 2026
- Executive Producer: 2006 – 2008; 2023 – 2026
- Supervising Producer: 2018 – 2019

== Awards and nominations ==
| Year | Award | Category | Nominated work | Result |
|---|---|---|---|---|
| 1989 | Daytime Emmy Award | Best Writing | Santa Barbara | Nominated |
| 1989 | Daytime Emmy Award | Best Writing | Santa Barbara | Won |
| 1990 | Daytime Emmy Award | Best Writing | Santa Barbara | Nominated |
| 1990 | Writers Guild of America | Daytime Serial | Santa Barbara | Won |
| 1990 | Writers Guild of America | Daytime Serial | Santa Barbara | Nominated |
| 1991 | Daytime Emmy Award | Best Writing | Santa Barbara | Won |
| 1991 | Writers Guild of America | Daytime Serial | One Life to Live | Nominated |
| 1991 | Writers Guild of America | Daytime Serial | One Life to Live | Won |
| 1991 | Writers Guild of America | Daytime Serial | Santa Barbara | Won |
| 1992 | Daytime Emmy Award | Best Writing | One Life to Live | Nominated |
| 1992 | Writers Guild of America | Daytime Serial | One Life to Live | Nominated |
| 1994 | Daytime Emmy Award | Best Writing | One Life to Live | Won |
| 1994 | Writers Guild of America | Daytime Serial | One Life to Live | Nominated |
| 1995 | Daytime Emmy Award | Best Writing | One Life to Live | Nominated |
| 1996 | Daytime Emmy Award | Best Writing | One Life to Live | Nominated |
| 1997 | Writers Guild of America | Daytime Serial | Sunset Beach | Nominated |
| 2003 | Writers Guild of America | Daytime Serial | One Life to Live | Nominated |
| 2005 | Writers Guild of America | Daytime Serial | As the World Turns | Nominated |
| 2006 | Daytime Emmy Award | Best Writing | As the World Turns | Nominated |
| 2006 | Writers Guild of America | Daytime Serial | The Young and the Restless | Won |
