= Michael Minnis =

American television soap opera writer

Michael Minnis is an American television writer.

== Positions held ==
The Bold and the Beautiful

- Script Writer: April 4, 1996 – December 10, 2003
- Storyline Consultant: December 22, 2003 – May 19, 2004
- Associate Head Writer: May 31, 2004 – January 28, 2008, April 16, 2008 – December 31, 2008
- Co-Head Writer: January 2, 2009 – July 3, 2023, November 8, 2023 - present
- Head Writer: July 5, 2023 – November 7, 2023

The Young and the Restless

- Production Crew: 1988 – 1993
- Script Writer: 1993 – February 13, 2003

== Awards and nominations ==
Daytime Emmy Award

- 7 Time Emmy Winner: Win, 1997 Best Writing, "The Young and the Restless", 2000 Best Writing, The Young and the Restless, 2010 Best Writing, "The Bold and the Beautiful", 2013 Best Writing, "The Bold and the Beautiful", 2015 Best Writing, "The Bold and the Beautiful", 2016 Best Writing, "The Bold and the Beautiful," 2019 Best Writing, "The Bold and the Beautiful"
- Nomination, 2006 & 2007, Best Writing, The Bold and the Beautiful
- Nomination, 1995, 1997-2001, 2003, Best Writing, The Young and the Restless

Writers Guild of America Award

- Win, 2002, Best Writing, The Young and the Restless
- Nomination, 1999 & 2001, Best Writing, The Young and the Restless
