= Barbara Bloom (television executive) =

American television executive and writer

- Education: Skidmore College
- Occupation: television executive
- Known for: Port Charles, One Life to Live
- Spouse: Frank Clem
- Children: 3

Barbara Bloom is an American television executive and writer best known for her work in daytime television.

== Career ==
Barbara got her start at Grey Entertainment and Media as a Copywriter and Account Executive, working on the ABC Television account, creating print, radio and television advertising for ABC.

In 1992, Bloom was hired by ABC to be the associate director of Advertising for their Daytime division. Later that year she was promoted to Director of Advertising and Promotion where she worked closely with Marla Provencio. Under Pat Fili-Krushel's leadership as President of ABC Daytime, Bloom's role expanded to include Programming Executive on the Daytime Drama One Life to Live. In 1994, Bloom relocated to Los Angeles as Vice President Daytime Programming West Coast. In this capacity she was responsible for General Hospital, initiating and overseeing the GH companion book, NYTIMES best seller Robin’s Diary. Bloom and General Hospital Producer Wendy Riche developed the half hour General Hospital spin-off, Port Charles, launched in 1997. In 2000 Bloom was recruited by Port Charles Executive Producer Julie Carruthers and ABC Daytime President Angela Shapiro to become Head Writer of Port Charles. That year she transitioned to Co-Headwriter under leadership of Barbara Esenstein and Jim Brown. Along with EP Julie Carruthers, the trio evolved the format of Port Charles to mirror the novella approach of Latin soap operas, with a new chapter beginning every thirteen weeks.

In 2003, Bloom was hired by CBS's Leslie Moonves and Nancy Tellem to be Senior VP of Daytime and Children's Programming for CBS. In addition to the CBS soaps, The Young and the Restless, The Bold and the Beautiful, As the World Turns and Guiding Light, CBS's line-up included The Price Is Right. Bloom successfully guided the transition of Drew Carey as Bob Barker's successor and installed Mike Richards as Executive Producer. Bloom extended Daytime's reach with the original digital series Inturn, a realized version of The Young and the Restless’s Jabot Cosmetics.

Bloom steered CBS away from its soap-centric roots and introduced the division's first development slate, launching Let's Make a Deal with Wayne Brady in 2009 and developing The Talk, the network's first owned daytime show. In recognition of her work reimagining CBS Daytime, Bloom was honored with Ad Age's Media Maven Award in 2010.

Bloom left CBS when her contract expired in 2011. In subsequent years, she focused on her family and on applying her strategic and narrative skills to the non-profit arena. Bloom returned to television in 2017, penning with Jenny Lynn episode 5014 "The Sin Eater" of the CW's hit show Arrow. She continues to work as a writer and Non-Profit Narrative Consultant in Los Angeles.

In 2017, it was revealed via Daytime Confidential that Barbara Bloom had been hired to write Breakdown at ABC's last remaining soap opera General Hospital.

== Education and personal life ==
A graduate of Skidmore College (1983) Barbara also attended Circle in the Squares Professional Program where she met her husband, actor Frank Clem. The two were married in 1992 and have three children.

== Television credits ==
- The Young and the Restless (Breakdown writer: 2007)
- Port Charles (co-Head Writer: May 2000-November 9, 2000 (hired by Angela Shapiro); associate head writer: November 10, 2000 – August 7, 2003)
- One Life to Live (Program Executive: 1993)
- General Hospital (Breakdown Writer: December 18, 2017 – June 28, 2021)
