= Tracey Ann Kelly =

American soap opera script writer

Tracey Ann Kelly is an American television soap opera script writer.

== Positions held ==
The Bold and the Beautiful

- Script writer: July 2, 1992 – June 28, 1995, September 15, 1998–present

== Awards and nominations ==
Daytime Emmy Awards:

Year	Nominated work	Category	Result
2000	The Bold and The Beautiful	Best Drama Series Writing Team	Nominated
2003	The Bold and The Beautiful	Best Drama Series Writing Team	Nominated
2006	The Bold and The Beautiful	Best Drama Series Writing Team	Nominated
2007	The Bold and The Beautiful	Best Drama Series Writing Team	Nominated
2008	The Bold and The Beautiful	Best Drama Series Writing Team	Nominated
2009	The Bold and The Beautiful	Best Drama Series Writing Team	Nominated
2010	The Bold and The Beautiful	Best Drama Series Writing Team	Won
2011	The Bold and The Beautiful	Best Drama Series Writing Team	Nominated
2013	The Bold and The Beautiful	Best Drama Series Writing Team	Won
2014	The Bold and The Beautiful	Best Drama Series Writing Team	Nominated
2015	The Bold and The Beautiful	Best Drama Series Writing Team	Won
