= Paula Cwikly =

American screenwriter

- Education: University of Dayton
- Occupation: television writer
- Known for: As the World Turns, Days of Our Lives
- Awards: Daytime Emmy Award

Paula Cwikly is an American soap opera writer for the Daytime television serial The Young and the Restless. She was NBC Daytime's director of daytime programming.

She is a 1982 graduate of the University of Dayton.

== Career ==
As the World Turns

- Associate Head Writer: Fall 2003 - March 2, 2005, August 5, 2005 - January 6, 2006

Days of Our Lives

- Co-Head Writer (with Peter Brash): March 29, 2002 - March 6, 2003
- Co-Head Writer (with Jeanne Marie Ford): since April 24, 2025
- Associate Head Writer: 2000 - March 28, 2002, March 6, 2003 - September 3, 2003

Sunset Beach

- Writer: 1998 - 1999

The Young and the Restless

- Breakdown Writer: January 4, 2008 – April 17, 2013
- Associate Head Writer: August 7, 2006 - August 3, 2007

== Awards and nominations ==
- Daytime Emmy Awards

- Nominated for Best Writing; As The World Turns, 2004-06
- Winner for Best Writing; As The World Turns, 2005

- Writers Guild of America Award

- Nomination for 2006 Season, The Young And The Restless); 2005 Season; As The World Turns; 2001 Season; Days of our Lives

Preceded by Tom Langan	Head writer of Days of Our Lives; March 29, 2002 – March 6, 2003; With: Peter Brash	Succeeded by Dena Higley
Preceded by Ron Carlivati	Head writer of Days of Our Lives since April 24, 2025; With: Jeanne Marie Ford	Succeeded by Incumbent
