= Rex M. Best =

American soap opera writer

Rex M. Best is an American soap opera writer. He was a staff script writer on "The Young and the Restless" for fifteen years (1987-2002). He currently writes scripts for Y&R's sister soap, "The Bold and the Beautiful." He has won eight Emmys for Best Writing (three for Y&R and five for B&B) and a Writers Guild Award. He currently lives in Greensboro, North Carolina. Prior to his daytime writing career, he taught students with autism in the Greensboro school system.

== Positions held ==
The Bold and the Beautiful

- Script Writer (October 2, 2003 - June 28, 2005; October 12, 2005 - January 7, 2008; December 8, 2008 – Present)
- Script Editor (July 25, 2005 - September 8, 2005)

The Young and the Restless

- Script Writer (September 1987 - July 2002) (15 years)

== Awards and nominations ==
Daytime Emmy Awards

- WINS: (1992, 1997 & 2000: Best Writing, The Young And The Restless); 2010: Best Writing, The Bold and the Beautiful; 2012: Best Writing, The Bold and the Beautiful; 2015: Best Writing, The Bold and the Beautiful,
- NOMINATIONS: (2007: Best Writing, The Bold and the Beautiful; 2006: Best Writing, The Bold And The Beautiful); (1990-1991, 1993–1995, 1998–1999, 2001 & 2003; Best Writing; The Young And The Restless)

Writers Guild of America Award

- WIN: (2002 Season; The Young and The Restless)
- NOMINATIONS: (1999 & 2001 Season; The Young and The Restless)
