= Lloyd Gold =

American screenwriter and playwright (born 1950)

Lloyd "Lucky" Gold (born September 6, 1950) is an American screenwriter and playwright.

Gold's plays have been produced at the Eugene O'Neill Theatre, the Seattle Repertory Theatre, the McCarter Theater and others. He wrote numerous film scripts for Miramax and was script doctor on Marvin's Room and Shakespeare in Love. He is co-creator of the PBS American Mystery Series, produced by Robert Redford and Rebecca Eaton. Gold has written both series and long form for television including USA Network's Stealing Christmas. He is the recipient of an NEA grant, 5 Emmys and 3 WGA Awards.

== Positions held ==
All My Children

- Breakdown Writer: May 19, 2011 - September 23, 2011

Another World

- Script Writer: 1982 - 1985

As the World Turns (hired by Jean Passanante)

- Co-Head Writer: June 7, 2010 - September 17, 2010
- Breakdown Writer: October 6, 2009 - June 4, 2010

General Hospital

- Breakdown Writer: April 10, 2017 – June 21, 2024

Guiding Light

- Co-Head Writer: July 2001 - November 2002; August 22, 2008 - September 18, 2009
- Script Writer: July 24, 2007 - February 29, 2008; April 14, 2008 - August 21, 2008
- Breakdown Writer: November 2002 - July 23, 2007

One Life to Live

- Script Writer: 1985 - 1997

The Young and the Restless

- Breakdown Writer: January 9, 2014 - February 24, 2017

== Awards and nominations ==
Daytime Emmy Awards

WINS

- (1987 & 1994; Best Writing; One Life to Live)
- (2007; Best Writing; Guiding Light)

NOMINATIONS

- (1985; Best Writing; Another World)
- (1990, 1992, 1995 & 1996; Best Writing; One Life to Live)
- (2003, 2005 & 2008; Best Writing; Guiding Light)
- (2010 & 2011; Best Writing; As the World Turns)
- (2012; Best Writing; All My Children)

Writers Guild of America Award

WINS

- (1993 season; One Life to Live)
- (2005 season; Guiding Light)
- (2011 season; As the World Turns)

NOMINATIONS

- (1987 & 1995 seasons; One Life to Live)
- (2003 & 2007 seasons; Guiding Light)
- (2012 season; All My Children)

== Head writing tenure ==
Preceded by Claire Labine	Head Writer of Guiding Light (with Christopher Dunn); July 2001 - November 2002	Succeeded by Millee Taggart; Carolyn Culliton
Preceded by David Kreizman; Donna Swajeski	Head Writer of Guiding Light (with David Kreizman, Christopher Dunn, and Jill Lorie Hurst); August 22, 2008 - September 18, 2009	Succeeded by Show canceled
Preceded by Jean Passanante; David Kreizman	Head Writer of As the World Turns (with Jean Passanante); June 7 - September 17, 2010	Succeeded by Show canceled
