= Shelly Altman =

American soap opera writer

Michelle "Shelly" Altman is an American soap opera writer who is known as breakdown and associate head writer of American daytime soap operas, including Another World, General Hospital and One Life to Live.

== Career ==
In 1987, Altman co-wrote a screenplay for Sweet Lorraine. From 1995 to 1999, Altman and Jean Passanante were associate head writers of Another World and, from 1999 to 2011, held the same position while doing One Life to Live.

From 2013 to 2015, Altman was a co-head writer of The Young and the Restless along with Jean Passanante. In 2015, Altman and Passanante replaced Ron Carlivati, who was the head writer of General Hospital since 2012. Altman had been the show's associate head co-writer since 2011, prior to which she was its breakdown writer.

== Awards and nominations ==
Daytime Emmy Awards

Win

- (2008; Best Writing; One Life To Live)
- (2014; Best Writing; The Young and the Restless)

Nominations

- (1996; Best Writing; Another World)
- (2002, 2006, 2009; Best Writing; One Life To Live)
- (2012, 2013; Best Writing; General Hospital)

Writers Guild of America Award

Win

- (2016; Best Writing; General Hospital)

Nominations

- (2003 and 2005 season; One Life To Live)
- (1997 season; Another World)

== Head writer history ==
Preceded by Garin Wolf	Head writer of General Hospital (with Garin Wolf); January 9 – February 20, 2012	Succeeded by Ron Carlivati
Preceded by Josh Griffith; Tracey Thomson	Head writer of The Young and the Restless (with Josh Griffith: 3/18/13-11/1/13) (with Tracey Thomson) (with Jean Passanante: 12/23/13-3/18/15) (with Charles Pratt Jr.: 1/16/15-3/18/15); March 18, 2013 – March 18, 2015	Succeeded by Charles Pratt Jr.
Preceded by Jean Passanante	Head writer of General Hospital (with Jean Passanante: 10/7/15-10/6/17) (with Chris Van Etten: 10/9/17-10/28/19); October 7, 2015 – October 28, 2019	Succeeded by Dan O'Connor; Chris Van Etten
