= David A. Levinson =

- Born: United States
- Education: Emerson College
- Occupation: Television writer

David A. Levinson is an American television and soap opera writer, originally from Falmouth, Massachusetts. He is a 1997 graduate of Emerson College in Boston.

== Career ==
All My Children (hired by Gordon Rayfield)

- Script Writer: March 2003 - January 14, 2004

As the World Turns (hired by Jean Passanante)

- Breakdown Writer: April 4, 2007 - January 24, 2008, April 18, 2008 - June 20, 2008
- Script Writer: November 27, 2006 - April 3, 2007, June 23, 2008 - November 24, 2009
- Script Editor: November 25, 2009 - June 25, 2010

Days of Our Lives (hired by Marlene Clark Poulter & Darrell Ray Thomas, Jr)

- Script Writer: June 2011 - 2013, 2017

One Life to Live (hired by Lorraine Broderick)

- Script Writer: 2001 - 2002

Sunset Beach (hired by Gary Tomlin)

- Research and Continuity Supervisor: 1998 - 1999
- Production Assistant: 1997 - 1998

The Young and the Restless (hired by Josh Griffith)

- Sub Script Writer: June 21, 2013

Live Through This

- Staff Writer, 2 out of 13 episodes: 1999-2000

== Awards and nominations ==
Daytime Emmy Awards

Winner

- 2013 - Best Writing; Days of Our Lives

Nominations

- 2011 - Best Writing; As the World Turns
- 2010 - Best Writing; As the World Turns
- 2004 - Best Writing; All My Children
- 2002 - Best Writing; One Life to Live

Writers Guild of America Award

- 2014 (win - "Days of Our Lives")
- 2010 (win - "As the World Turns")
- 2009 (win - "As the World Turns")
- 2008 (nomination - "As the World Turns")
- 2007 (nomination - "As the World Turns")
- 2003 (win - "All My Children")
