= Jeanne Marie Ford =

American television soap opera writer

Jeanne Marie Ford (previously known as Jeanne Marie Grunwell) is an American television soap opera writer. She is also an English teacher at Hagerstown Community College. Ford, formerly a member of Writers Guild of America West, left and maintained financial core status during the 2007–08 Writers Guild of America strike.

== Positions held ==
As the World Turns

- Script Writer: July 30, 2007 - October 18, 2007

Days of Our Lives

- Co-Head Writer (with Paula Cwikly): since April 24, 2025
- Script Writer: June 30, 1999 - December 24, 2004, August 16, 2006 – April 27, 2007, December 11, 2008 - June 23, 2010; August 17, 2012 – April 23, 2025
- Associate Head Writer: January 2, 2003 – May 15, 2005, October 24, 2008 - August 25, 2011
- Script Editor: September 17, 2004 – January 4, 2007; August 26, 2011 - August 16, 2012
- Occasional Script Writer: 2004
- Continuity Coordinator: 1999 - 2000
- Writer's Assistant: 1992 - 1996

One Life to Live (hired by Ron Carlivati)

- Script Writer: November 26, 2007 - September 2008

== Awards and nominations ==
Writers Guild of America Award

- Nomination, 2001, Best Writing, Days of our Lives

Preceded by Ron Carlivati	Head writer of Days of Our Lives since April 24, 2025; With: Paula Cwikly	Succeeded by Incumbent
