= Linda Schreiber =

American television soap opera writer

Linda Schreiber is an American television soap opera writer. Her writing partner was her father Eric Freiwald.

== Positions held ==
The Young and the Restless: Script Writer (1996–1998; November 2003-February 2004; December 2004-February 2005; November 2005- December 2007; April 2, 2008 – 2013)

== Awards ==
- 2006 - Daytime Emmy Award winner in the Outstanding Drama Series Writing Team category for The Young and The Restless
- 2005 - Writers Guild Of America Award winner for The Young and The Restless
