= Melissa Salmons =

American writer

- Occupation: writer
- Notable work: Days of Our Lives

Melissa Salmons is an American writer known for her work on television soap operas, known for her work on Days of Our Lives.

== Positions held ==
Another World

- Script Writer (1999 – June 25, 1999)

As the World Turns

- Script Writer (1997–1998, July 21, 2004 – August 4, 2006)

Days of Our Lives

- Script Writer (August 17, 2012 – November 1, 2016)

Guiding Light

- Script Writer (1987–1991, 2000 – July 2004)

One Life to Live

- Script Writer (May 26, 2009 – January 13, 2012)

The Young and the Restless

- Script Writer (October 22, 2008 – March 23, 2009)

== Awards and nominations ==
Daytime Emmy Awards

WINS

- (1990; Best Writing; Guiding Light)
- (2005; Best Writing; As the World Turns)

NOMINATIONS

- (1989, 1992 & 2003; Best Writing; Guiding Light)
- (2006; Best Writing; As the World Turns)
- (2014; Best Writing; Days of Our Lives)

Writers Guild of America Award

WINS

- (1992 season; Guiding Light)
- (2007 season; As the World Turns)
- (2010 season; The Young and the Restless)
- (2014 season; Days of Our Lives)

NOMINATIONS

- (1989, 2002 & 2003 seasons; Guiding Light)
- (1998, 1999 & 2006 seasons; As the World Turns)
- (2010, 2011 & 2013 seasons; One Life to Live)
- (2013 & 2015 seasons; Days of Our Lives)
