= Marla Kanelos =

American television soap opera writer (born 1968)

Marla Kanelos (born December 15, 1968) is an American television soap opera writer.

== Positions held ==
All My Children

- Script Writer: March 8, 2005 - January 2, 2008
- Occasional Script Writer: 2004, 2005
- Associate Head Writer: June 4, 2004 - October 8, 2004

Days of Our Lives

- Writers' Assistant: 1990s

General Hospital

- Script Writer: 1998
- Production Coordinator: 1997 - 1998

Port Charles

- Associate Head Writer: 1998 - October 3, 2003
- Production Coordinator: 1997 - 1998

The Young and the Restless

- Associate Head Writer: April 11, 2008 - November 2, 2012
- Writers' Assistant: 1990s

Wild Card

- Script Writer: 2003

== Awards and nominations ==
Writers Guild of America Award

- Nomination, 2006, Best Writing, All My Children
