= Elizabeth Korte =

American television writer

Elizabeth Korte is an American television writer for the ABC Daytime soap opera General Hospital.

== Positions held ==
General Hospital

- Occasional breakdown writer: 2005–2008
- Script editor: 2002 – January 3, 2008, March 17, 2008– March 14, 2024
- Associate head writer: 1998–2000, 2001 – January 3, 2008, March 17, 2008– March 14, 2024
- Co-Head writer (with Michele Val Jean): February 5 – April 27, 2001
- Head Writer (with Patrick Mulcahey): March 15, 2024 – August 6, 2024; (with Chris Van Etten): August 7, 2024 – present
- Script writer: 1996–2000, 2001 – 2006
- Script Continuity: 1991 – 1996

General Hospital: Night Shift

- Head writer/co-creator (with Robert Guza Jr.): July 12, 2007 – October 4, 2007
- Script: Frayed Anatomies

== Awards and nominations ==
Korte has been nominated for eight Daytime Emmy Awards, winning twice and three Writers Guild of America Awards, with one win.

== Head writer history ==
Preceded by Robert Guza Jr.	Head writer of General Hospital (with Michele Val Jean); February 5 – April 27, 2001	Succeeded by Megan McTavish
Preceded by none	Co-Head Writer of General Hospital: Night Shift (with Robert Guza Jr.); July 12, 2007 – October 4, 2007	Succeeded by Sri Rao
Preceded by Dan O'Connor; Chris Van Etten	Co-Head Writer of General Hospital (with Patrick Mulcahey: March 15 – August 6, 2024) (with Chris Van Etten: August 7, 2024 – present); March 15, 2024 – present	Succeeded by Incumbent

== See also ==
- History of General Hospital
- List of General Hospital characters
