= Chris Van Etten =

American television soap opera writer

Chris Van Etten is an American television soap opera writer from Rochester, New York. Chris resides in New York, New York with his husband.

Van Etten is best known as a writer on ABC soap opera General Hospital. In 2017, he was promoted as co-head writer of the series, replacing Jean Passanante. Following Shelly Altman's retirement in 2019, Van Etten was joined with Dan O'Connor as co-head writer. Both Van Etten and O'Connor were dismissed from their positions as co-head writers in early 2024; former associate head writer Patrick Mulcahey and present script editor Elizabeth Korte were named as their replacements. That May, Chris returned to the series as co-head writer with Elizabeth Korte following the departure of Patrick Mulcahey.

He, along with David Ozanich and David Levithan, created young adult novel series Likely Story for Random House.

== Positions held ==
General Hospital

- Breakdown Writer (May 10, 2012 – October 6, 2017; May 14, 2024 – August 6, 2024)
- Co-Head Writer (October 9, 2017 – March 14, 2024; August 7, 2024 – present)

One Life to Live

- Breakdown Writer (November 8, 2006 - February 22, 2008; May 2, 2008 - January 13, 2012)
- Occasional Associate Head Writer (August 15, 2005 - November 2006)
- Continuity Supervisor (2004)
- Writers' Associate (2003)
- Assistant to the Executive Producer (January 2001 - 2003)

== Awards and nominations ==
Daytime Emmy Awards

- Nomination, 2009, Best Writing, One Life to Live

Daytime Emmy Awards

- Win, 2008, Best Writing, One Life to Live
- Nomination, 2006, Best Writing, One Life to Live

Writers Guild of America Awards

- Nomination, 2005, Best Writing, One Life to Live

== Works ==
- Likely Story, co-written with David Levithan and David Ozanich (2010)
- All That Glitters, co-written with David Levithan and David Ozanich (2008)
- Red Carpet Riot, co-written with David Levithan and David Ozanich (2009)

== Head writer history ==
| Preceded by Jean Passanante; Shelly Altman | Head writer of General Hospital (with Shelly Altman: 10/9/17–10/28/19) (with Dan O'Connor: 10/29/19 – 7/24/23); October 9, 2017 – July 24, 2023 | Succeeded by WGA Strike |
| Preceded by WGA Strike | Head writer of General Hospital (with Dan O'Connor); December 18, 2023 – March 14, 2024 | Succeeded by Elizabeth Korte; Patrick Mulcahey |
| Preceded by Elizabeth Korte; Patrick Mulcahey | Head writer of General Hospital (with Elizabeth Korte); August 7, 2024 – present | Succeeded by Incumbent |
