= Ron Carlivati =

American screenwriter

Ronald David Carlivati (born November 25, 1968) is an American screenwriter. He is best known for his tenures as head writer on the ABC Daytime soap operas One Life to Live and General Hospital. He served as head writer for the Peacock soap opera Days of Our Lives until his departure in July 2024.

== Career ==
It was announced in the February 27, 2007, edition of Soap Opera Digest that Carlivati was promoted to Co-Head Writer of One Life to Live alongside Dena Higley. On June 4, 2007, Frank Valentini announced that Carlivati would be promoted to head writer effective immediately. The first episode with Carlivati as Head Writer aired September 11, 2007.

Due to One Life to Live's cancellation on ABC, and later the show's abandoned transition to online distribution via production company Prospect Park, it was announced on December 1, 2011, that Carlivati would be taking over as head-writer on ABC's one remaining soap, General Hospital effective January 9, 2012. The first episode with Carlivati as head writer aired February 21, 2012.

=== One Life to Live ===
In the months that followed Carlivati's promotion to head writer, the show experienced a creative resurgence, receiving great critical acclaim for revitalizing characters, routinely incorporating and honoring the show's long history, and improving dialogue. However, the show's ratings continued to slide, a problem that all daytime soap operas have been experiencing in recent years.

Carlivati's work aired until February 14, 2008, when the WGA strike forced a new headwriter (Gary Tomlin) to take over. Once the WGA strike was settled, Carlivati returned as headwriter, with his post-strike episodes hitting the air waves on May 2, 2008.

On June 20, 2008, Carlivati and his writing team won the Daytime Emmy for Outstanding Writing in a Drama Series for his work on OLTL.

With the end of One Live to Live's television run in January 2012, Carlivati joined the writing team at General Hospital.

=== General Hospital ===
Following the end of One Life to Live in January 2012, Carlivati was appointed head writer of General Hospital, and his material began airing towards the end of February.

In an effort to bring over fans of One Life to Live, who were now without a soap to call their own, Carlivati brought over Kristen Alderson (Starr Manning), Kassie DePaiva (Blair Cramer), Michael Easton (John McBain), Roger Howarth (Todd Manning) and Florencia Lozano (Tea Delgado) to bring their signature roles to General Hospital. While DePaiva and Lozano only appeared in a guest capacity, the other three became contract cast members. When copyright issues intervened, dictating that the show could not use the characters of Starr Manning, Todd Manning, and John McBain; the three actors under contract at the time were recast as Kiki Jerome, Robert "Franco" Frank, and Silas Clay.

In addition to casting the former One Life to Live actors shortly after his arrival, Carlivati also made a point of re-introducing a wide variety of fan favorite veterans to the canvas, including Tristan Rogers (Robert Scorpio) Genie Francis (Laura Spencer), Lynn Herring (Lucy Coe), Finola Hughes (Anna Devane), Sean Kanan (A.J. Quartermaine) and Kin Shriner (Scott Baldwin) for extended runs. Many of them helped make the 50th anniversary a success during the aforementioned transitional absence of the contracted actors brought over from One Life to Live. On July 24, 2015, ABC announced their decision to replace Carlivati as head-writer of General Hospital with Shelly Altman and Jean Passanante.

=== Days of Our Lives ===
On January 23, 2017, Carlivati was announced as the newly appointed head writer for Days of Our Lives, replacing former co-head writers Dena Higley and Ryan Quan. Per reports, this change is said to be "effective immediately". Carlivati's first credit as head writer began on July 19, 2017.

On July 19, 2024, it was announced Carlivati had departed the soap as head writer, with his material to air until April 2025. Paula Cwikly and Jeanne Marie Ford were named as his successors "effective immediately".

== Personal life ==
Carlivati was born in Rochester, New York, and attended McQuaid Jesuit High School. After graduating high school in 1986, Carlivati attended College of the Holy Cross for undergraduate studies and later went to George Washington University for graduate school, earned a Juris Doctor degree, and currently lives in Manhattan. He is openly gay.

== Awards and nominations ==
Daytime Emmy Award

- WINS: (2008 ~ Outstanding Writing in a Drama Series, One Life to Live)
- WINS: (2018 - Outstanding Writing in a Drama Series, Days of Our Lives)
- NOMINATIONS: (2002 and 2006 ~ Best Writing, One Life to Live)

Writers Guild of America Award

- Wins: (2016; Daytime Drama Writing)
- Wins: (2014 and 2015; Outstanding Writing in a Drama Series, General Hospital)
- NOMINATIONS: (2003 and 2006 ~ One Life to Live)

== Positions held ==
Show	Occupation	Duration
Days of Our Lives	Head Writer	July 19, 2017, to April 23, 2025
General Hospital	Head Writer	February 21, 2012, to October 5, 2015
One Life to Live	Head Writer	September 11, 2007, to January 13, 2012
One Life to Live	Co-Head Writer (with Dena Higley)	May 8, 2007, to September 10, 2007
One Life to Live	Breakdown Writer	2001 to 2007
One Life to Live	Script Writer	1998 to 2001
One Life to Live	Writer's Assistant	1996 to 1998
Beyond the Gates	Breakdown Writer	March 3, 2025, to Present
