= Lynn Martin (writer) =

American television soap opera writer

Lynn Martin (born in Washington, D.C.) is an American television soap opera writer. She is a graduate of Georgetown University and Columbia University. Martin has been nominated for ten Daytime Emmy Awards, winning five times. She has also been nominated for the Writers Guild of America Award four times, winning in 2020.

== Career ==
Martin has worked as a script writer for the series Another World, As the World Turns, Beyond the Gates, The City, Days of Our Lives, Port Charles, and The Young and the Restless.

== Accolades ==
Martin was nominated for seven Daytime Emmy Awards as a member of the writing team for As the World Turns. She won four of those nominations. As a member of the writing team for The Young and the Restless, Martin was nominated for and won the Daytime Emmy for Outstanding Drama Series Writing Team in 2023. She was nominated again for her work with The Young and the Restless in 2024, and for her work with Beyond the Gates in 2026.

She was also nominated for the Writers Guild of America Award for Best Writing in a Daytime Drama in 2006 as part of the writing team on As the World Turns. She was nominated for and won the award for her part as a member of the writing team for The Young and the Restless in 2020, with another nomination in 2022 for the same series. In 2026, she was nominated as a part of the writing team on Beyond the Gates.

Daytime Emmys
Year	Work	Recipients	Result	Ref.
2000	As the World Turns	Head writers: Lorraine Broderick; Leah Laiman; Co-head writer: Carolyn Culliton; Associate head writers: Hal Corley; Stephen Demorest; Addie Walsh; Script editor: Karen Lewis; Writers: Jeff Beldner; Lisa Connor; Christina Covino; Susan Dansby; Judith Donato; Susan Kirshenbaum; Lynn Martin; Lynda Myles; Louise Shaffer; Peggy Sloane; Ted Sullivan	Nominated	
2001	As the World Turns	Head writers: Leah Laiman; Hogan Sheffer; Co-head writer: Carolyn Culliton; Associate head writers: Stephanie Braxton; Hal Corley; Stephen Demorest; Writers: Richard J. Allen; Jeff Beldner; Tom Casiello; Laura Maria Censabella; Susan Dansby; Judith Donato; Karen Lewis; Lynn Martin; Marie Masters; Courtney Simon; Judy Tate	Won	
2002	As the World Turns	Head writer: Hogan Sheffer; Co-head writers: Carolyn Culliton; Jean Passanante; Associate head writers: Jeff Beldner; Tom Casiello; Susan Dansby; Tom Reilly; Writers: Richard J. Allen; Laura Maria Censabella; Judith Donato; Craig Heller; Meg Kelly; Lynn Martin; Marie Masters; Royal Miller; Elizabeth Page; Courtney Simon; Judy Tate	Won	
2003	As the World Turns	Head writer: Hogan Sheffer; Co-head writer: Jean Passanante; Associate head writers: Carolyn Culliton; Susan Dansby; Charlotte Gibson; Tom Reilly; Mary Ryan; Writers: Judy Donato; Craig Heller; Meg Kelly; Lynn Martin; Royal Miller; Elizabeth Page; Courtney Simon; Judy Tate	Nominated	
2004	As the World Turns	Head writer: Hogan Sheffer; Co-head writer: Jean Passanante; Associate head writers: Susan Dansby; Charlotte Gibson; Tom Reilly; Mary Ryan; Christopher Whitesell; Writers: Judith Donato; Craig Heller; Meg Kelly; Lynn Martin; Elizabeth Page; Courtney Simon; Judy Tate	Won	
2005	As the World Turns	Head writer: Hogan Sheffer; Co-head writer: Jean Passanante; Associate head writers: Carolyn Culliton; Paula Cwikly; Charlotte Gibson; Frederick Johnson; Christopher Whitesell; Writers: Susan Dansby; Judith Donato; Craig Heller; Meg Kelly; Lynn Martin; Elizabeth Page; Melissa Salmons; Courtney Simon; Judy Tate	Won	
2006	As the World Turns	Head writer: Jean Passanante; Co-head writers: Leah Laiman; Christopher Whitesell; Associate head writers: Lisa Connor; Paula Cwikly; Charlotte Gibson; Frederick Johnson; Trent Jones; Hogan Sheffer; Writers: Susan Dansby; Judy Donato; Josh Griffith; Lynn Martin; Elizabeth Page; Melissa Salmons; Courtney Simon; Judy Tate	Nominated	
2023	The Young and the Restless	Head writer: Josh Griffith; Associate head writer: Amanda L. Beall; Writers: Susan Banks; Jeff Beldner; Sara A. Bibel; Brent Boyd; Michael Conforti; Sara Endsley; Janice Ferri Esser; Marin Gazzaniga; Simone Hawthorne; Lynn Martin; Natalie Minardi Slater; Teresa Zimmerman	Won	
2024	The Young and the Restless	Head writer: Josh Griffith; Co-head writer: Amanda L. Beall; Associate head writer: Jeff Beldner; Writers: Susan Banks; Sara Bibel; Brent Boyd; Sara Endsley; Janice Ferri Esser; Marin Gazzaniga; Simone Hawthorne; Lynn Martin; Rebecca McCarthy; Natalie Minardi Slater	Nominated	
2026	Beyond the Gates	Head writer: Michele Val Jean; Co-head writers: Robert Guza Jr.; Tracey Thomson; Writers: Sara A. Bibel; Jazmen Darnell Brown; Ron Carlivati; Cheryl L. Davis; Christopher Dunn; Jamey Giddens; Gregori J. Martin; Lynn Martin; Danielle Paige; Judy Tate; Teresa Zimmerman; Story editor: Susan Dansby	Nominated	

Writers Guild of America
Year	Work	Recipients	Result	Ref.
2006	As the World Turns	Head writer: Jean Passanante; Co-head writers: Leah Laiman; Christopher Whitesell; Writers: Lisa Connor; Paula Cwikly; Susan Dansby; Judy Donato; Charlotte Gibson; Josh Griffith; Frederick Johnson; Trent Jones; Lynn Martin; Elizabeth Page; Melissa Salmons; Hogan Sheffer; Courtney Simon; Judy Tate	Nominated	
2020	The Young and the Restless	Writers: Amanda L. Beall; Jeff Beldner; Sara Bibel; Matt Clifford; Annie Compton; Christopher Dunn; Sara Endsley; Janice Ferri Esser; Mellinda Hensley; Lynn Martin; Anne Schoettle; Natalie Minardi Slater; Teresa Zimmerman	Won	
2022	The Young and the Restless	Head writer: Amanda L. Beall; Writers: Susan Banks; Jeff Beldner; Sara A. Bibel; Brent Boyd; Susan Dansby; Christopher Dunn; Sara Endsley; Janice Ferri Esser; Marin Gazzaniga; Lynn Martin; Natalie Minardi Slater; Teresa Zimmerman	Nominated	
2026	Beyond the Gates	Writers: Sara A. Bibel; Jazmen Darnell Brown; Ron Carlivati; Susan Dansby; Cheryl L. Davis; Christopher Dunn; Robert Guza Jr.; Gregori J. Martin; Lynn Martin; Danielle Paige; Judy Tate; Michele Val Jean; Teresa Zimmerman	Nominated	
