= 60th Writers Guild of America Awards =

60th WGA Awards
- Date: February 9, 2008
- Organized by: Writers Guild of America, East and the Writers Guild of America, West

The 60th Writers Guild of America Awards honored the best film, television, and videogame writers of 2007. Winners were announced on February 9, 2008.

== Winners and nominees ==
=== Film ===
==== Best Adapted Screenplay ====
No Country for Old Men - Joel Coen and Ethan Coen (screenplay); Cormac McCarthy (author) †

- Into the Wild - Sean Penn (screenplay); Jon Krakauer (author)
- Le scaphandre et le papillon (The Diving Bell and the Butterfly) - Ronald Harwood (screenplay); Jean-Dominique Bauby (author)
- There Will Be Blood - Paul Thomas Anderson (screenplay); Upton Sinclair (author)
- Zodiac - James Vanderbilt (screenplay); Robert Graysmith (author)

==== Best Original Screenplay ====
Juno - Diablo Cody †

- Knocked Up - Judd Apatow
- Lars and the Real Girl - Nancy Oliver
- Michael Clayton - Tony Gilroy
- The Savages - Tamara Jenkins

==== Best Documentary Feature Screenplay ====
Taxi to the Dark Side - Alex Gibney

- The Camden 28 - Anthony Giacchino
- Nanking - Elisabeth Bentley, Bill Guttentag, Dan Sturman, and Elisabeth Bentley; story by Bill Guttentag and Dan Sturman
- No End in Sight - Charles Ferguson
- The Rape of Europa - Richard Berge, Nicole Newnham, and Bonni Cohen
- Sicko - Michael Moore

=== Television ===
==== Dramatic Series ====
| Title | Writers | Network |
|---|---|---|
| Dexter | Scott Buck, Daniel Cerone, Drew Greenberg, Lauren Gussis, Kevin Maynard, Clyde Phillips, Melissa Rosenberg, and Timothy Schlattman | Showtime |
| Friday Night Lights | Bridget Carpenter, Kerry Ehrin, Carter Harris, Elizabeth Heldens, David Hudgins, Jason Katims, Patrick Massett, Andy Miller, Aaron Rahsaan Thomas, and John Zinman | NBC |
| Mad Men | Lisa Albert, Bridget Bedard, Andre Jacquemetton, Maria Jacquemetton, Tom Palmer, Chris Provenzano, Robin Veith, and Matthew Weiner | AMC |
| The Sopranos | David Chase, Diane Frolov, Andrew Schneider, Matthew Weiner, and Terence Winter | HBO |
| The Wire | Ed Burns, Chris Collins, Dennis Lehane, David Mills, Eric Overmyer, George Pelecanos, Richard Price, David Simon, and William F. Zorzi | HBO |

==== Comedy Series ====
| Title | Writers | Network |
|---|---|---|
| 30 Rock | Brett Baer, Jack Burditt, Kay Cannon, Robert Carlock, Tina Fey, Dave Finkel, Daisy Gardner, Donald Glover, Matt Hubbard, Jon Pollack, John Riggi, Tami Sagher, and Ron Weiner | NBC |
| Curb Your Enthusiasm | Larry David | HBO |
| Entourage | Marc Abrams, Lisa Alden, Michael Benson, Brian Burns, Doug Ellin, Alex Gansa, Tim Griffin, Dusty Kay, Stephen Levinson, Ally Musika, Wes Nickerson, and Rob Weiss | HBO |
| Flight of the Conchords | Damon Beesley, James Bobin, Jemaine Clement, Eric Kaplan, Bret McKenzie, Iain Morris, Duncan Sarkies, Pauls Simms, and Taika Waititi | HBO |
| The Office | Steve Carell, Jennifer Celotta, Greg Daniels, Lee Eisenberg, Anthony Farrell, Brent Forrester, Ricky Gervais, Mindy Kaling, Ryan Koh, Lester Lewis, Paul Lieberstein, Stephen Merchant, B. J. Novak, Michael Schur, Justin Spitzer, Gene Stupnitsky, Caroline Williams, and Larry Wilmore | NBC |

==== New Series ====
| Title | Writers | Network |
|---|---|---|
| Damages | Jeremy Doner, Mark Fish, Davey Holmes, Glenn Kessler, Todd A. Kessler, Willie Reale, Adam Stein, Aaron Zelman, and Daniel Zelman | FX |
| Flight of the Conchords | Damon Beesley, James Bobin, Jemaine Clement, Eric Kaplan, Bret McKenzie, Iain Morris, Duncan Sarkies, Pauls Simms, and Taika Waititi | HBO |
| Mad Men | Lisa Albert, Bridget Bedard, Andre Jacquemetton, Maria Jacquemetton, Tom Palmer, Chris Provenzano, Robin Veith, and Matthew Weiner | AMC |
| Pushing Daisies | Chad Gomez Creasey, Dara Resnik Creasey, Bryan Fuller, Abby Gewanter, Jim Danger Gray, Lisa Joy, Kath Lingenfelter, Rina Mimoun, Jack Monaco, Scott Nimerfro, and Peter Ocko | ABC |
| The Sarah Silverman Program | Dan Fybel, Rich Rinaldi, Rob Schrab, Jon Schroeder, Sarah Silverman, Dan Sterling, and Harris Wittels | Comedy Central |

==== Episodic Drama ====
| Title | Series | Writers | Network |
|---|---|---|---|
| "The Dark Defender" | Dexter | Tim Schlattmann | Showtime |
| "Final Grades" | The Wire | Teleplay by David Simon; Story by David Simon & Ed Burns | HBO |
| "Flashes Before Your Eyes" | Lost | Damon Lindelof & Drew Goddard | ABC |
| "The Hobo Code" | Mad Men | Chris Provenzano | AMC |
| "The Round File" | The Closer | Michael Alaimo | TNT |
| "The Second Coming" | The Sopranos | Terence Winter | HBO |

==== Episodic Comedy ====
| Title | Series | Writers | Network |
|---|---|---|---|
| "The Job" | The Office | Paul Lieberstein & Michael Schur | NBC |
| "Local Ad" | The Office | B. J. Novak | NBC |
| "Hard Ball" | 30 Rock | Matt Hubbard | NBC |
| "Pie-lette" | Pushing Daisies | Bryan Fuller | ABC |
| "Phyllis' Wedding" | The Office | Caroline Williams | NBC |
| "Sally Returns" | Flight of the Conchords | James Bobin & Jemaine Clement & Bret McKenzie | HBO |

==== Long Form - Original ====
| Title | Writers | Network |
|---|---|---|
| Pandemic | Bryce Zabel & Jackie Zabel | Hallmark Channel |
| The Lost Room | "Night One" Teleplay by Laura Harkcom & Christopher Leone; Story by Christopher Leone & Paul Workman. "Night Two" and "Night Three" written by Laura Harkcom & Christopher Leone | Sci-Fi |

==== Long Form - Adaptation ====
| Title | Writers | Network |
|---|---|---|
| Bury My Heart at Wounded Knee | Teleplay by Daniel Giat, based on the book by Dee Alexander Brown | HBO |
| The Company: A Story of the CIA | Teleplay by Ken Nolan, based on the novel by Robert Littell | TNT |
| The Starter Wife | Teleplay by Sara Parriott & Josann McGibbon, based on the book by Gigi Levangie Grazer | USA |

==== Animation ====
| Title | Series | Writers | Network |
|---|---|---|---|
| "The Haw-Hawed Couple" | The Simpsons | Matt Selman | Fox |
| "The Homer of Seville" | The Simpsons | Carolyn Omine | Fox |
| "Kill Gil, Volumes I & II" | The Simpsons | Jeff Westbrook | Fox |
| "Stop! Or My Dog Will Shoot" | The Simpsons | John Frink | Fox |
| "The Passion of Dauterive" | King of the Hill | Tony Gama-Lobo & Rebecca May | Fox |
| "Lucky's Wedding Suit" | King of the Hill | Jim Dauterive | Fox |

==== Comedy/Variety (Including Talk) Series ====
| Title | Writers | Network |
|---|---|---|
| The Daily Show with Jon Stewart | Head Writer Steve Bodow, Written by Rachel Axler, Kevin Bleyer, Rich Blomquist, Tim Carvell, J. R. Havlan, Scott Jacobson, D.J. Javerbaum, Rob Kutner, Josh Lieb, Sam Means, Jason Reich, Jason Ross and Jon Stewart | Comedy Central |
| The Colbert Report | Written by Bryan Adams, Michael Brumm, Stephen Colbert, Rich Dahm, Eric Drysdale, Rob Dubbin, Glenn Eichler, Peter Grosz, Peter Gwinn, Barry Julien, Jay Katsir, Laura Krafft, Frank Lesser, Tom Purcell, and Allison Silverman | Comedy Central |
| Late Night with Conan O'Brien | Writers Mike Sweeney, Chris Albers, Jose Arroyo, Dan Cronin, Kevin Dorff, Daniel J. Goor, Michael Gordon, Tim Harrod, Berkley Johnson, Brian Kiley, Michael Koman, Brian McCann, Guy Nicolucci, Conan O'Brien, Robert Smigel, Brian Stack, and Andrew Weinberg | NBC |
| Penn & Teller: Bullshit! | Written by Penn Jillette, Teller, David Weiss, Jon Hotchkiss, Michael Goudeau, Star Price, Sheryl Zohn, Cliff Schoenberg | Showtime |
| Real Time with Bill Maher | Written by Scott Carter, David Feldman, Lance Crouther, Adam Felber, Matt Gunn, Brian Jacobsmeyer, Jay Jaroch, Chris Kelly, Bill Maher, Billy Martin, Jonathan Schmock, Danny Vermont | HBO |
| Saturday Night Live | Head Writers Seth Meyers, Paula Pell, Andrew Steele, Writers Doug Abeles, James Anderson, Alex Baze, James Downey, Charlie Grandy, Steve Higgins, Colin Jost, Erik Kenward, John Lutz, Seth Meyers, Lorne Michaels, Matt Murray, Paula Pell, Marika Sawyer, Akiva Schaffer, Robert Smigel, John Solomon, Emily Spivey, Andrew Steele, Jorma Taccone, Bryan Tucker, Additional Sketch By Jim Cashman | NBC |

==== Daytime Serials ====
| Title | Writers | Network |
|---|---|---|
| All My Children | James Harmon Brown, Barbara Esensten, Megan McTavish, Addie Walsh, Chip Hayes, Stephen Demorest, Michelle Patrick, Amanda L. Beall, Jeff Beldner, Karen Lewis, Rebecca Taylor, Marla Kanelos, Courtney Bugler, Joanna Cohen, Kate Hall | ABC |
| As the World Turns | Jean Passanante, Leah Laiman, Christopher Whitesell, Courtney Simon, Anna Cascio, Lisa Connor, David A. Levinson, Gary Sunshine, Bettina F. Bradbury, Richard Culliton, Susan Dansby, Judith Donato, Mimi Leahey, Elizabeth Page Judy Tate | CBS |
| General Hospital | Robert Guza Jr., Elizabeth Korte, Michael Conforti, Garin Wolf, David Goldschmid, Michele Val Jean, Mary Sue Price, Karen Harris, Susan Wald, Tracey Thompson | ABC |
| The Young and the Restless | Lynn Marie Latham, Scott Hamner, Jeff Gottesfeld, Cherie Bennett, Bernard Lechowick, James Stanley, Natalie Minardi Slater, Lynsey DuFour, Marina Alburger, Sara A. Bibel, Paula Cwikly, Janice Ferri Esser, Eric Freiwald, Linda Schreiber, Joshua S. McCaffrey, Sandra Weintraub | CBS |

==== Children's ====
===== Episodic & specials =====
| Title | Series | Writers | Network |
|---|---|---|---|
| "Look Whose Not Talking" | Flight 29 Down | D. J. MacHale | Discovery Kids |
| "Nat is a Stand Up Guy" | The Naked Brothers Band | Polly Draper | Nickelodeon |

===== Script - long form or special =====
| Title | Writers | Network |
|---|---|---|
| The Haunting Hour: Don't Think About It | Billy Brown, and Dan Angel | Cartoon Network |
| Johnny Kapahala: Back on Board | Teleplay by Ann Austen & Douglas Sloan and Max Enscoe & Annie DeYoung, story by Ann Austen & Douglas Sloan | Disney Channel |

==== Documentary ====
===== Current events =====
| Title | Series | Writers | Network |
|---|---|---|---|
| "The Enemy Within" | Frontline | Lowell Bergman & Oriana Zill De Granados | PBS |
| "News War Part 1: Secrets Sources and Spin" | Frontline | Written by Raney Aronson-Rath and Lowell Bergman & Seth Bomse | PBS |
| "News War Part 3: What's Happening to the News?" | Frontline | Stephen Talbot & Lowell Bergman | PBS |
| "Return of the Taliban" | Frontline | Martin Smith | PBS |
| "Security vs. Liberty: The Other War" | America at a Crossroads | Edward Gray | PBS |
| "Spying on the Home Front" | Frontline | Hedrick Smith & Rick Young | PBS |

===== Other than current events =====
| Title | Series | Writers | Network |
|---|---|---|---|
| "Alexander Hamilton" | American Experience | Ronald Blumer | PBS |
| "Billy Strayhorn: Lush Life" | Independent Lens | Robert Levi and Robert Seidman | PBS |
| "Forgotten Genius" | Nova | Stephen Lyons & Llewellyn M. Smith | PBS |
| "Episode Four: Pride of Our Nation" | The War | Geoffrey C. Ward | PBS |

==== News ====
===== Regularly scheduled, bulletin or breaking report =====
| Title | Series | Writers | Network |
|---|---|---|---|
| "Amish School Shooting" | World News with Charles Gibson | Josh Landis, Joel Siegel, Julia Kathan, and Charles Gibson | ABC |
| "The Battle for Iraq: Four Years After the Invasion" | Up to the Minute | J. Craig Wilson | CBS |

===== Analysis, feature, or commentary =====
| Title | Series | Writers | Network |
|---|---|---|---|
| "The 7 New Wonders of the World: The Internet" | Good Morning America | Laura Zaccaro | ABC |
| "To Bee or Not To Bee" | Good Morning America | Mary Pflum | ABC |

=== Video games ===
==== Videogame Writing ====
Dead Head Fred - Dave Ellis and Adam Cogan

- Crash of the Titans - Christopher Mitchell
- The Simpsons Game - Lead writer Matt Selman, written by Tim Long and Matt Warburton, dialogue by Jeff Poliquin
- The Witcher - Lead story designer Artur Ganszyniec, dialogue by Sebastian Stepien, additional dialogue by Marcin Blacha, writers Sande Chen and Anne Toole
- World in Conflict - Story design by Christofer Emgard, story consultant Larry Bond, script consultant Ed Zuckerman
