= 54th Writers Guild of America Awards =

54th WGA Awards
- Date: March 2, 2002
- Organized by: Writers Guild of America, East and the Writers Guild of America, West

The 54th Writers Guild of America Awards honored the best writing in film, television and radio of 2001. Nominees for television and radio were announced on January 16, 2002, while nominees for film were announced on February 7, 2002. Winners were announced on March 2, 2002, in joint ceremonies at the Beverly Hilton Hotel in Beverly Hills, California and at The Pierre Hotel in New York City, New York. The ceremonies were hosted by Jeffrey Ross (Beverly Hilton) and Mort Sahl (The Pierre).

== Winners and nominees ==
=== Notes ===
- Nominees for television and radio were originally broadcast between September 1, 2000, and August 31, 2001.
- Winners are in bold (some categories resulted in a tie, allowing two winners for some awards).

=== Film ===
Best Original Screenplay

**Gosford Park (USA Films) – Julian Fellowes** †

- The Man Who Wasn't There (USA Films) – Joel and Ethan Coen
- Monster's Ball (Lions Gate Films) – Milo Addica and Will Rokos
- Moulin Rouge! (20th Century Fox) – Baz Luhrmann and Craig Pearce
- The Royal Tenenbaums (Buena Vista Pictures) – Wes Anderson and Owen Wilson
Best Adapted Screenplay

**A Beautiful Mind (Universal Pictures) – Akiva Goldsman; Based on the book by Sylvia Nasar** †

- Black Hawk Down (Columbia Pictures) – Ken Nolan; Based on the book by Mark Bowden
- Bridget Jones's Diary (Miramax Films) – Richard Curtis, Andrew Davies, and Helen Fielding; Based on the book by Helen Fielding
- Ghost World (United Artists) – Daniel Clowes and Terry Zwigoff; Based on the graphic novel by Daniel Clowes
- The Lord of the Rings: The Fellowship of the Ring (New Line Cinema) – Fran Walsh, Philippa Boyens, and Peter Jackson; Based on the book by J.R.R. Tolkien

=== Television ===
Episodic Drama

**"Pine Barrens" – The Sopranos (HBO) – Teleplay by Terence Winter; Story by Tim Van Patten & Terence Winter**

- "Blood Drops" – CSI: Crime Scene Investigation (CBS) – Teleplay by Ann Donahue; Story by Tish McCarthy
- "Proshai, Livushka" – The Sopranos (HBO) – David Chase
- "Employee of the Month" – The Sopranos (HBO) – Robin Green & Mitchell Burgess
- "Somebody's Going to Emergency, Somebody's Going to Jail" – The West Wing (NBC) – Paul Redford & Aaron Sorkin
- "Two Cathedrals" – The West Wing (NBC) – Aaron Sorkin
Episodic Comedy

**"Italy" – Everybody Loves Raymond (CBS) – Philip Rosenthal**

- "The Grandparents" – Malcolm in the Middle (Fox) – Gary Murphy & Neil Thompson
- "Bowling" – Malcolm in the Middle (Fox) – Alex Reid
- "Just Say Yes" – Sex and the City (HBO) – Cindy Chupack
- "My Motherboard, My Self" – Sex and the City (HBO) – Julie Rottenberg & Elisa Zuritsky
- "The Pendulum" – Titus (Fox) – Christopher Titus
Long Form – Original

**Conspiracy (HBO) – Loring Mandel**

- 61* (HBO) – Hank Steinberg
- For Love or Country: The Arturo Sandoval Story (HBO) – Timothy J. Sexton
- Varian's War (Showtime) – Lionel Chetwynd
Long Form – Adapted

**Anne Frank: The Whole Story (ABC) – Teleplay by Kirk Ellis; Based on the book by Melissa Müller**

- Baby (TNT) – Teleplay by David Manson, Kerry Kennedy, and Patricia MacLachlan; Based on the book by Patricia MacLachlan
- Life with Judy Garland: Me and My Shadows (ABC) – Teleplay by Robert L. Freedman; Based on the memoir by Lorna Luft
- The Mists of Avalon (TNT) – Teleplay by Gavin Scott; Based on the book by Marion Zimmer Bradley
- The Song of the Lark (PBS) – Teleplay by Joseph Maurer; Based on the book by Willa Cather
Comedy/Variety – Talk Series

**Late Night with Conan O'Brien (NBC) – Mike Sweeney, Chris Albers, Ellie Barancik, Andy Blitz, Kevin Dorff, Jon Glaser, Michael Gordon, Brian Kiley, Michael Koman, Brian McCann, Guy Nicolucci, Conan O'Brien, Andrew Secunda, Robert Smigel, Brian Stack, and Andrew Weinberg**

- Late Show with David Letterman (CBS) – Eric Stangel, Justin Stangel, Gerard Mulligan, Joe Toplyn, Michael Barrie, Jim Mulholland, Steve Young, Gabe Abelson, Carter Bays, Craig Thomas, Chris Harris, Tom Ruprecht, Bill Scheft, Lee H. Ellenberg, and David Letterman
- Politically Incorrect (ABC) – Supervising Writer: Billy Martin; Writers: Kevin Bleyer, Brian Jacobsmeyer, Bill Kelley, Bill Maher, Ned Rice, Kevin Rooney, Danny Vermont, and Eric Weinberg
- Saturday Night Live (NBC) – Tina Fey, Dennis McNicholas, James Anderson, Robert Carlock, Tony Daro, James Downey, Hugh Fink, Melanie Graham, Steve Higgins, Erik Kenward, Adam McKay, Lorne Michaels, Jerry Minor, Matt Murray, Paula Pell, Matt Piedmont, Jon Rosenfeld, Frank Sebastiano, Michael Schur, T. Sean Shannon, Robert Smigel, Barry Sobel, Andrew Steele, and Scott Wainio
Comedy/Variety (Music, Awards, Tributes) – Specials

**The Kennedy Center Honors (CBS) – Don Baer and George Stevens Jr.; Film sequences written by Sara Lukinson and Harry Miles Muheim**

- Saturday Night Live: Presidential Bash 2000 (NBC) – James Downey and Al Franken
Daytime Serials

**All My Children (ABC) – Agnes Nixon, Jean Passanante, Craig Carlson, Frederick Johnson, N. Gail Lawrence, Victor Miller, Juliet Law Packer, Addie Walsh, Mimi Leahey, Bettina F. Bradbury, Charlotte Gibson, David Hiltbrand, Janet Iacobuzio, Royal Miller, John PiRoman, Rebecca Taylor, and Neal Bell**

- Days of Our Lives (NBC) – Tom Langan, Dena Higley, Dorothy Ann Purser, Victor Gialanella, Peter Brash, Paula Cwikly, Frances Myers, Sofia Landon Geier, Jeanne Marie Grunwell, Randy Holland, Edwin Klein, Richard Culliton, Christopher Whitesell, Joyce Rosenblad, and Cydney Kelley
- The Guiding Light (CBS) – Claire Labine, Matt Labine, Eleanor Labine, Tita Bell, Stephanie Braxton, Christopher Dunn, Jill Lorie Hurst, David Kreizman, Penelope Koechl, Danielle Paige, Melissa Salmons, and David Smilow
- The Young and the Restless (NBC) – Kay Alden, Trent Jones, Jerry Birn, John F. Smith, Natalie Minardi, Jim Houghton, Eric Freiwald, Rex M. Best, Janice Ferri, Michael Minnis, and Joshua McCaffrey
Children's Script

**My Louisiana Sky (Showtime) – Teleplay by Anna Sandor; Based on the book by Kimberly Willis Holt**

- By Dawn's Early Light (Showtime) – Jacqueline Feather & David Seidler
- Dragonheart: A New Beginning (Sci-Fi Channel) – Shari Goodhartz; Based on characters created by Patrick Read Johnson and Charles Edward Pogue
- "Have Your Cake" – Just Deal (NBC) – Julie Nathanson
- "Pilot" – Lizzie McGuire (Disney Channel) – Terri Minsky

=== Documentary ===
Documentary Script – Current Events

**"Drug Wars, Part 2" – Frontline (PBS) – Lowell Bergman & Kenneth Levis and Doug Hamilton & Oriana Zill**

- "Drug Wars, Part 1" – Frontline (PBS) – Martin Smith and Brooke Runnette & Oriana Zill
Documentary Script – Other than Current Events

Tie between the following two programs:
**"Scottsboro: An American Tragedy" – American Experience (PBS) – Barak Goodman**
**"Hitler's Lost Sub" – Nova (PBS) – Rushmore DeNooyer**

- "Stephen Foster" – American Experience (PBS) – Ken Emerson & Randy MacLowry
- "Finding Lucy" – American Masters (PBS) – Thomas Wagner
- "Medicating Kidgs" – Frontline (PBS) – Martin Smith
- "Dedicated to Class" – Jazz (PBS) – Geoffrey C. Ward

=== News ===
TV News Script – Regularly Scheduled, Bulletin, or Breaking Report

**"Wedding Disaster" (CBS) – Jonathan Kaplan**

TV News Script – Analysis, Feature, or Commentary

**"The Cruelty Connection" (CBS) – Jonathan Kaplan**

- "Eyewitness to Summer, Sun & Storms" (ABC) – Glenn Steinfast

=== Radio ===
Radio Documentary

**"Eye on Death Row" – Weekend Roundup (CBS Radio Network) – Wendy Zentz**

Radio News Script – Regularly Scheduled, Bulletin, or Breaking Report

**"The Recount" (CBS Radio Network) – Paul Farry**

Radio News Script – Analysis, Feature or Commentary

**"Preserving American Sound" – Perspective (ABC News Radio) – Scott L. Anderson**

- "Condemned No More: Life After Death Row" (CBS Radio Network) – Wendy Zentz
- "Dan Rather Reporting: Obscene Journal" (CBS Radio Network) – Paul Farry
- "Hogs" – Perspective (ABC News Radio) – Janice Kirkel
- "Reserved for Father" – Perspective (ABC News Radio) – Elizabeth Dribben

=== Promotional writing ===
On-Air Promotion

**"NBC Promotions" (NBC) – Lori Sunshine**

- "NBC Promotions" (NBC) – Judie Henninger

=== Special awards ===
Animation Writers Caucus Animation Award

**Alan Burnett**

Edmund H. North Award

**Christopher Knopf**

Evelyn F. Burkey Award

**Colin Callender**

Ian McLellan Hunter Award

**Donald E. Westlake**

Laurel Award for Screenwriting Achievement

**Blake Edwards**

Paddy Chayefsky Laurel Award for Television Writing Achievement

**Glen and Les Charles**

Morgan Cox Award

**D.C. Fontana**

Paul Selvin Award

**For Love or Country: The Arturo Sandoval Story (HBO) – Timothy J. Sexton**

Valentine Davies Award

**David Angell**
