= 62nd Writers Guild of America Awards =

62nd WGA Awards
- Date: February 20, 2010
- Organized by: Writers Guild of America, East and the Writers Guild of America, West

The 62nd Writers Guild of America Awards honored the best film, television, and videogame writers of 2009. Winners were announced on February 20, 2010.

== Nominees ==
Names in bold denote the winners.

=== Film ===
==== Best Adapted Screenplay ====
- Crazy Heart
- Julie & Julia
- Precious: Based on the novel "Push" by Sapphire †
- Star Trek
- **Up in the Air**

==== Best Original Screenplay ====
- (500) Days of Summer
- Avatar
- The Hangover
- **The Hurt Locker** †
- A Serious Man

==== Best Documentary Feature Screenplay ====
- Against the Tide – Richard Trank; based on original material written by Richard Trank and Rabbi Marvin Hier
- Capitalism: A Love Story – Michael Moore
- **The Cove** – Mark Monroe
- Earth Days – Robert Stone
- Good Hair – Chris Rock, Jeff Stilson, Lance Crouther, and Chuck Sklar
- Soundtrack for a Revolution – Bill Guttentag and Dan Sturman

=== Television ===
==== Dramatic Series ====
| Title | Writers | Network |
|---|---|---|
| Breaking Bad | Sam Catlin, Vince Gilligan, Peter Gould, George Mastras, J. Roberts, John Shiban, and Moira Walley-Beckett | AMC |
| Dexter | Scott Buck, Charles H. Eglee, Lauren Gussis, Clyde Phillips, Scott Reynolds, Melissa Rosenberg, Timothy Schlattman, and Wendy West | Showtime |
| Friday Night Lights | Bridget Carpenter, Kerry Ehrin, Ron Fitzgerald, Brent Fletcher, Etan Frankel, Jason Gavin, Elizabeth Heldens, David Hudgins, Rolin Jones, Jason Katims, Patrick Massett, Derek Santos Olson, and John Zinman | NBC |
| Lost | Carlton Cuse, Adam Horowitz, Melinda Hsu Taylor, Edward Kitsis, Damon Lindelof, Greggory Nations, Kyle Pennington, Elizabeth Sarnoff, Brian K. Vaughan, and Paul Zbyszewski | ABC |
| **Mad Men** | **Lisa Albert, Andrew Colville, Kater Gordon, Cathryn Humphris, Andre Jacquemetton, Maria Jacquemetton, Brett Johnson, Erin Levy, Marti Noxon, Frank Pierson, Robin Veith, Dahvi Waller, and Matthew Weiner** | AMC |

==== Comedy Series ====
| Title | Writers | Network |
|---|---|---|
| **30 Rock** | **Jack Burditt, Kay Cannon, Robert Carlock, Tom Ceraulo, Vali Chandrasekaran, Tina Fey, Donald Glover, Steve Hely, Matt Hubbard, Dylan Morgan, Paula Pell, Jon Pollack, John Riggi, Tami Sagher, Josh Siegal, Ron Weiner, and Tracey Wigfield** | NBC |
| Curb Your Enthusiasm | Larry David | HBO |
| Glee | Ian Brennan, Brad Falchuk, and Ryan Murphy | Fox |
| Modern Family | Paul Corrigan, Sameer Gardezi, Joe Lawson, Steven Levitan, Christopher Lloyd, Dan O'Shannon, Brad Walsh, Caroline Williams, Bill Wrubel, and Danny Zuker | ABC |
| The Office | Jennifer Celotta, Danny Chun, Greg Daniels, Lee Eisenberg, Anthony Q. Farrell, Brent Forrester, Dan Goor, Charlie Grandy, Mindy Kaling, Ryan Koh, Lester Lewis, Paul Lieberstein, Warren Lieberstein, B. J. Novak, Michael Schur, Aaron Shure, Justin Spitzer, Gene Stupnitsky, and Halsted Sullivan | NBC |

==== New Series ====
| Title | Writers | Network |
|---|---|---|
| Glee | Ian Brennan, Brad Falchuk, and Ryan Murphy | Fox |
| The Good Wife | Angela Amato Velez, Corinne Brinkerhoff, Ted Humphrey, Dee Johnson, Todd E. Kessler, Michelle King, and Robert King | CBS |
| Hung | Colette Burson, Ellie Herman, Emily Kapnek, Brett C. Leonard, Dmitry Lipkin, and Angela Robinson | HBO |
| **Modern Family** | **Paul Corrigan, Sameer Gardezi, Joe Lawson, Steven Levitan, Christopher Lloyd, Dan O'Shannon, Brad Walsh, Caroline Williams, Bill Wrubel, and Danny Zuker** | ABC |
| Nurse Jackie | Taii K. Austin, Liz Brixius, Rick Cleveland, Evan Dunsky, Nancy Fichman, Liz Flahive, Jennifer Hoppe, Mark Hudis, John Hilary Shepherd, Linda Wallem, and Christine Zander | Showtime |

==== Episodic Drama ====
| Title | Series | Writers | Network |
|---|---|---|---|
| **"Broken"** | **House** | **David Foster, Russel Friend, Garrett Lerner, and David Shore** | Fox |
| "Come, Ye Saints" | Big Love | Melanie Marnich | HBO |
| "The Grown-Ups" | Mad Men | Brett Johnson and Matthew Weiner | AMC |
| "Guy Walks Into an Advertising Agency" | Mad Men | Robin Veith and Matthew Weiner | AMC |
| "I Will Rise Up" | True Blood | Nancy Oliver | HBO |
| "Phoenix" | Breaking Bad | John Shiban | AMC |

==== Episodic Comedy ====
| Title | Series | Writers | Network |
|---|---|---|---|
| **"Apollo, Apollo"** | **30 Rock** | **Robert Carlock** | NBC |
| "Broke" | The Office | Charlie Grandy | NBC |
| "Chapter 1" | Eastbound & Down | Jody Hill, Ben Best, and Danny R. McBride | HBO |
| "Gossip" | The Office | Paul Lieberstein | NBC |
| **"Pilot"** | **Modern Family** | **Steven Levitan and Christopher Lloyd** | ABC |
| "Reunion" | 30 Rock | Matt Hubbard | NBC |

==== Long Form – Original ====
| Title | Writers | Network |
|---|---|---|
| **Georgia O'Keeffe** | **Michael Cristofer** | Lifetime |
| Grey Gardens | Teleplay by Michael Sucsy and Patricia Rozema; Story by Michael Sucsy | HBO |
| Pedro | Screenplay by Dustin Lance Black; Story by Paris Barclay and Dustin Lance Black | MTV |

==== Long Form – Adaptation ====
| Title | Writers | Network |
|---|---|---|
| America | Teleplay by Joyce Eliason and Rosie O'Donnell, Based upon the novel by E.R. Frank | Lifetime |
| **Taking Chance** | **Teleplay by Lieutenant Colonel Michael R. Strobl, USMC (Ret.) and Ross Katz, Based on the short story by Lieutenant Colonel Michael R. Strobl, USMC (Ret.)** | HBO |

==== Animation ====
| Title | Series | Writers | Network |
|---|---|---|---|
| "The Burns and the Bees" | The Simpsons | Stephanie Gillis | Fox |
| "Eeny Teeny Maya Moe" | The Simpsons | John Frink | Fox |
| "Gone Maggie Gone" | The Simpsons | Billy Kimball and Ian Maxtone-Graham | Fox |
| "Take My Life, Please" | The Simpsons | Don Payne | Fox |
| **"Wedding for Disaster"** | **The Simpsons** | **Joel H. Cohen** | Fox |

==== Comedy/Variety (Including Talk) Series ====
| Title | Writers | Network |
|---|---|---|
| The Colbert Report | Head Writers Barry Julien, Thomas Purcell, Writers Michael Brumm, Stephen Colbert, Richard Dahm, Rob Dubbin, Glenn Eichler, Peter Grosz, Peter Gwinn, Jay Katsir, Frank Lesser, Opus Moreschi, Meredith Scardino, Allison Silverman, and Max Werner | Comedy Central |
| **The Daily Show with Jon Stewart** | **Head Writer Steve Bodow, Writers Rory Albanese, Rachel Axler, Kevin Bleyer, Rich Blomquist, Tim Carvell, Wyatt Cenac, Hallie Haglund, J.R. Havlan, DJ Javerbaum, J. R. Havlan, David Javerbaum, Elliott Kalan, Josh Lieb, Sam Means, Jo Miller, John Oliver, Daniel Radosh, Jason Ross, and Jon Stewart** | Comedy Central |
| Real Time with Bill Maher | Head writer: Billy Martin, Writers: Scott Carter, Adam Felber, Matt Gunn, Brian Jacobsmeyer, Jay Jaroch, Chris Kelly, Bill Maher, Jonathan Schmock, and Danny Vermont | HBO |
| **Saturday Night Live** | **Head Writer: Seth Meyers, Writers: Doug Abeles, James Anderson, Alex Baze, Jessica Conrad, James Downey, Steve Higgins, Colin Jost, Erik Kenward, Rob Klein, John Lutz, Lorne Michaels, John Mulaney, Paula Pell, Simon Rich, Marika Sawyer, Akiva Schaffer, John Solomon, Emily Spivey, Kent Sublette, Jorma Taccone, and Bryan Tucker; Additional Sketches by Adam McKay and Andrew Steele** | NBC |
| The Tonight Show with Conan O'Brien | Head Writer: Mike Sweeney, Writers Chris Albers, Jose Arroyo, Josh Comers, Dan Cronin, Kevin Dorff, Andres du Bouchet, Michael Gordon, Berkley Johnson, Brian Kiley, Rob Kutner, Todd Levin, Brian McCann, Guy Nicolucci, Conan O'Brien, Matt O'Brien, Andy Richter, Brian Stack, and Andrew Weinberg | NBC |

==== Comedy/Variety – Music, Awards, Tributes – Specials ====
| Title | Writers | Network |
|---|---|---|
| **25th Independent Spirit Awards** | **Billy Kimball and Neal MacLennan** | AMC / IFC |
| We Are One: The Obama Inaugural Celebration at the Lincoln Memorial | George Stevens Jr., Michael Stevens, and Sara Lukinson | HBO |

==== Daytime Serials ====
| Title | Writers | Network |
|---|---|---|
| All My Children | Jeff Beldner, Joanna Cohen, Kate Hall, Chip Hayes, Michelle Patrick, Charles Pratt Jr., Rebecca Taylor, Tracey Thomson, and Addie Walsh | ABC |
| As the World Turns | Peter Brash, Lisa Connor, Susan Dansby, Cheryl L. Davis, Leah Laiman, David A. Levinson, Leslie Nipkow, Jean Passanante, Gordon Rayfield, and Courtney Simon | CBS |
| One Life to Live | Shelly Altman, Ron Carlivati, Anna Theresa Cascio, Aida Croal, Carolyn Culliton, Janet Iacobuzio, Frederick Johnson, Sharon Lennon, Elizabeth Page, Melissa Salmons, Katherine Schock, Scott Sickles, and Chris Van Etten | ABC |
| **The Young and the Restless** | **Amanda L. Beall, Tom Casiello, Lisa Connor, Janice Ferri Esser, Eric Freiwald, Jay Gibson, Scott Hamner, Marla Kanelos, Beth Milstein, Natalie Minardi Slater, Melissa Salmons, Linda Schreiber, James Stanley, Sandra Weintraub, and Teresa Zimmerman** | CBS |

==== Children's ====
===== Episodic and Specials =====
| Title | Series | Writers | Network |
|---|---|---|---|
| "A Monster Problem" | Imagination Movers | Randi Barnes, Rick Gitelson, and Scott Gray | Disney Channel |
| "Frankly, It's Becoming a Habitat" | Sesame Street | Joseph Mazzarino | PBS |
| "Mouse and Home" | Imagination Movers | Michael G. Stern, Randi Barnes, Rick Gitelson, and Scott Gray | Disney Channel |
| "The Rival" | True Jackson, VP | Dan Kopelman | Nickelodeon |
| **"Welcome to the Jungle"** | **The Troop** | **Max Burnett** | Nickelodeon |
| "Wild Nature Survivor Guy" | Sesame Street | Christine Ferraro | PBS |

===== Long Form or Special =====
| Title | Writers | Network |
|---|---|---|
| **Another Cinderella Story** | **Written by Erik Patterson and Jessica Scott** | ABC Family |

==== Documentary ====
===== Current events =====
| Title | Series | Writers | Network |
|---|---|---|---|
| "Black Money" | Frontline | Lowell Bergman and Oriana Zill de Granados | PBS |
| "Heat" | Frontline | Martin Smith | PBS |
| "The Hugo Chávez Show" | Frontline | Ofra Bikel | PBS |
| "Inside the Meltdown" | Frontline | Michael Kirk | PBS |
| **"The Madoff Affair"** | **Frontline** | **Marcela Gaviria and Martin Smith** | PBS |
| "Poisoned Waters" | Frontline | Hedrick Smith and Rick Young | PBS |

===== Other than Current Events =====
| Title | Series | Writers | Network |
|---|---|---|---|
| "The Assassination of Abraham Lincoln" | American Experience | Written by Barak Goodman | PBS |
| "Episode Two: 1890–1915: The Last Refuge" | The National Parks: America's Best Idea | Written by Dayton Duncan | PBS |
| **"The Trials of J. Robert Oppenheimer"** | **American Experience** | **Written by David Grubin** | PBS |
| Soul of a People: Writing America's Story | | Written by David A. Taylor, Olive Emma Bucklin, and Andrea Kalin | Smithsonian Channel |
| "We Shall Remain: Episode Three: Trail of Tears" | American Experience | Written by Mark Zwonitzer | PBS |
| "We Shall Remain: Episode Two: Tecumseh's Vision" | American Experience | Written by Ric Burns | PBS |

==== News ====
===== Regularly scheduled, bulletin, or breaking report =====
| Title | Series | Writers | Network |
|---|---|---|---|
| CBS Evening News | | Joe Clines, Jerry Cipriano, and Jared Crawford | CBS |
| Recession Candy | | R. Polly Leider | CBS |
| **World News with Charles Gibson** | | **Lee Kamlet, Julia Kathan, and Joel Siegel** | ABC |

===== Analysis, Feature, or Commentary =====
| Title | Series | Writers | Network |
|---|---|---|---|
| "All Night Long" | Good Morning America | Mary Pflum | ABC |
| **"A Private War: Expose: America's Investigative Reports"** | **Bill Moyers Journal** | **Thomas M. Jennings** | PBS |
| "Election Day" | Bill Moyers Journal | Bill Moyers and Michael Winship | PBS |
| "Financial Fingers" | CBS News | R. Polly Leider | CBS |
| "The Words That Won the White House" | Good Morning America | Lisa Ferri | ABC |

=== Radio ===
==== Documentary ====
- **2008 Year in Review – Written by Gail Lee**; CBS

==== News – Regularly Scheduled or Breaking ====
- So Many Goodbyes – Written by Gail Lee; CBS Radio
- WCBS News Radio – Written by Robert Hawley; CBS Radio
- **World News This Week − July 11, 2009 – Written by Darren Reynolds**; ABC Radio

==== News – Analysis, Feature or Commentary ====
- Black History Month – Written by Arleen Lebe; CBS Radio
- End of Summer – Written by Duane Tollison; CBS Radio
- Farewells – Written by Gail Lee; CBS Radio
- **Paul Harvey: An American Life – Written by Stu Chamberlain**; ABC Radio

=== Promotional Writing and Graphic Animation ===
==== On-Air Promotion (Radio or Television) ====
- How I Learned To Stop Worrying and Love the Promo Process – Written by Michelle Straebler; WNBC
- **"Vegas" (Dateline), "The Wanted" Promo, NBC Nightly News Promo, "Iran" (Dateline), "Cheat" (Dateline) – Written by Barry Fitzsimmons**; NBC

==== Television Graphic Animation ====
- **"Hudson Splashdown" (CBS Evening News with Katie Couric) – Written by David M. Rosen and Shannon L. Toma**; CBS

=== Video games ===
==== Videogame Writing ====
- Assassin's Creed II – Story by Corey May, Script Writers Corey May, Joshua Rubin, Jeffrey Yohalem; Ubisoft
- Call of Duty: Modern Warfare 2 – Written by Jesse Stern; Additional Writing Steve Fukuda; Story by Todd Alderman, Steve Fukuda, Mackey McCandlish, Zied Rieke, Jesse Stern, Jason West, Battlechatter Dialogue, and Sean Slayback; Activision
- **Uncharted 2: Among Thieves – Written by Amy Hennig; Sony Computer Entertainment**
- Wet – Written by Duppy Demetrius and Bethesda Softworks
- X-Men Origins: Wolverine – Written by Marc Guggenheim; Activision
