= 50th Writers Guild of America Awards =

50th WGA Awards
- Date: 21 February 1998
- Organized by: Writers Guild of America, East and the Writers Guild of America, West

The 50th Writers Guild of America Awards, given on 21 February 1998, honored the best writers in film and television of 1997.

== Film ==
=== Best Adapted Screenplay ===
L.A. Confidential – Curtis Hanson and Brian Helgeland †

- Donnie Brasco – Paul Attanasio
- The Ice Storm – James Schamus
- Wag the Dog – Hilary Henkin and David Mamet
- The Wings of the Dove – Hossein Amini

=== Best Original Screenplay ===
As Good as It Gets – Mark Andrus and James L. Brooks

- Boogie Nights – Paul Thomas Anderson
- The Full Monty – Simon Beaufoy
- Good Will Hunting – Matt Damon and Ben Affleck †
- Titanic – James Cameron

== Television ==
=== Best Episodic Drama ===
"Entrapment" - Law & Order - Rene Balcer and Richard Sweren

- "Whose Appy Now?" - ER - Neal Baer
- "Deadbeat" - Law & Order - Ed Zuckerman and I. C. Rapoport

=== Best Episodic Comedy ===
"The Fatigues" - Seinfeld - Gregg Kavet and Andy Robin

- "The Puppy Episode" - Ellen - Mark Driscoll, Dana Savel, Tracey Newman, Jonathan Stark and Ellen DeGeneres
- "The Impossible Dream" - Frasier - Rob Greenberg
- "The Chicken Roaster" - Seinfeld - Alec Berg and Jeff Schaffer
- "The Bizarro Jerry" - Seinfeld - David Mandel
- "Ellen, Or Isn't She?" - The Larry Sanders Show - Judd Apatow, John Markus and Garry Shandling
- "The Book" - The Larry Sanders Show - Maya Forbes

1997 Daytime Serials Winner- General Hospital: Claire Labine; Matthew Labine; Robert Guza, Jr.; Karen Harris; Michele Val Jean; Meg Bennett; Ralph Ellis; Mary Ryan; Jane Atkins; Stephanie Braxton; Judith Pinsker; Lynda Myles; Elizabeth Korte; Patrick Mulcahey; Lisa Lieberman

Other Nominees: All My Children: Agnes Nixon; Lorraine Broderick; Hal Corley; Fredrick Johnson; Gail Lawrence; Jeff Beldner; Christina Covino; Courtney Sherman; Millee Taggart; Karen Lewis; Elizabeth Smith; Michelle Patrick; Bettina F. Bradbury; Judith Donato; Kathleen Klein; Jane Owen Murphy
