= 47th Daytime Emmy Awards =

- Awarded for: Outstanding achievement in daytime television
- Date: June 26, 2020 (rescheduled date due to the COVID-19 pandemic)
- Location: Pasadena, California (original planned location); Various locations via video-conferencing
- Country: United States
- Presented by: NATAS; ATAS
- Hosted by: Carrie Ann Inaba, Eve, Sharon Osbourne, Sheryl Underwood, and Marie Osmond

Highlights
- Most awards: The Young and the Restless (3)
- Most nominations: General Hospital (23)
- Outstanding Drama Series: The Young and the Restless
- Outstanding Game Show: Jeopardy!
- Website: theemmys.tv/daytime/

Television/radio coverage
- Network: CBS
- Viewership: 3.324 million

The 47th Daytime Emmy Awards, presented by the National Academy of Television Arts and Sciences (NATAS), honored the best in U.S. daytime television programming in 2019. The winners in leading categories were presented in a remotely-produced special aired by CBS on June 26, hosted by the panel of the network's daytime talk show The Talk.

The NATAS originally planned to hold a ceremony over three nights for the first time on June 12–14, 2020, at the Pasadena Civic Auditorium in Pasadena, California. Due to the COVID-19 pandemic, the ceremony was cancelled. The nominations, originally scheduled to be announced on April 27, 2020, were also delayed to May 21.

== Ceremony information ==
The 47th Daytime Emmy Awards were originally scheduled for the first time to be presented over three nights, instead of the traditional main ceremony and the separate Creative Arts ceremony, to honor its ever expanding set of award categories. On March 19, 2020, the NATAS postponed the ceremonies due to the COVID-19 pandemic. The NATAS then announced on April 28 that the awards would be presented at a date to be determined later, in a remotely-produced "virtual" format.

On May 20, the NATAS announced that the winners in leading categories would be presented in a special airing June 26 on CBS. It marked the first time that the Daytime Emmys were broadcast on U.S. TV since 2015 (after being relegated to a webcast), and the ceremony's return to both CBS and broadcast television for the first time since 2011. The special was produced by Associated Television International, which had produced previous Daytime Emmys ceremonies for CBS. The nominees were announced the next day on CBS's daytime talk show The Talk, whose panel would later be announced as hosts of the special.

Some of the additional award categories were announced simultaneously on Twitter, while others are planned to be announced separately later in July 2020. The Spanish language winners have yet to be announced and no clear date has been set.

=== Award changes ===
As part of several initiatives regarding gender identity, the NATAS decided to replace both the younger actor and younger actress drama categories with a single gender-neutral Outstanding Younger Performer in a Drama Series.

== Winners and nominees ==
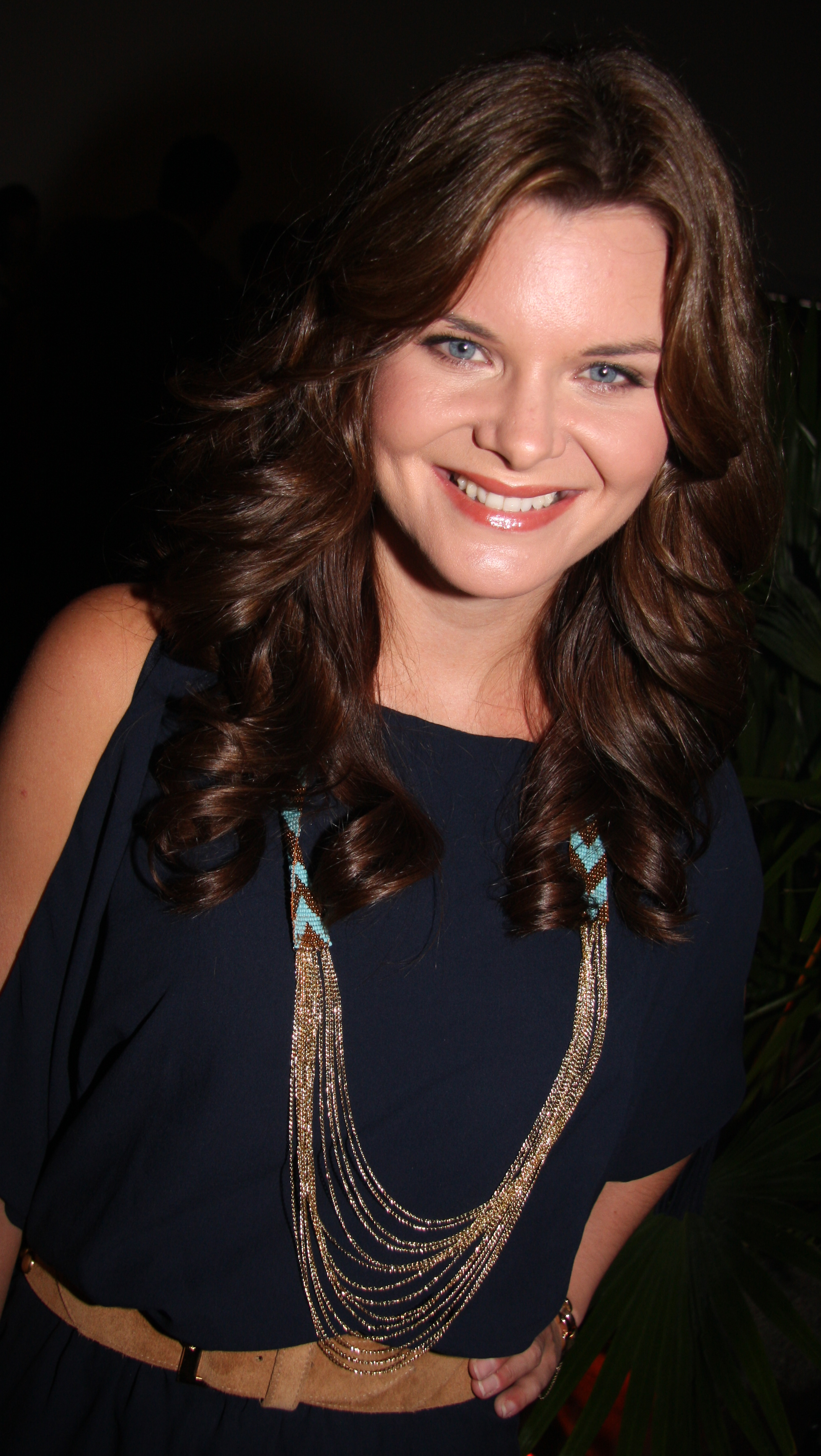
Heather Tom, Outstanding Lead Actress in a Drama Series winner

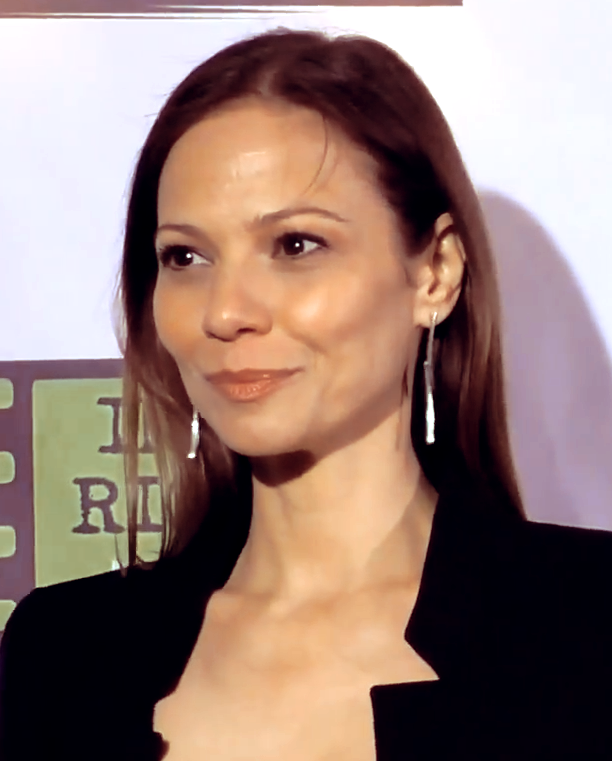
Tamara Braun, Outstanding Supporting Actress in a Drama Series.

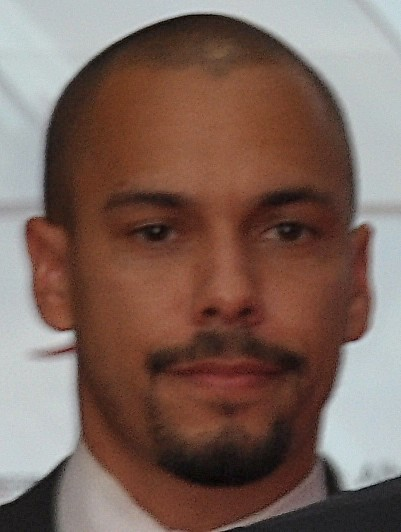
Bryton James, Outstanding Supporting Actor in a Drama Series.

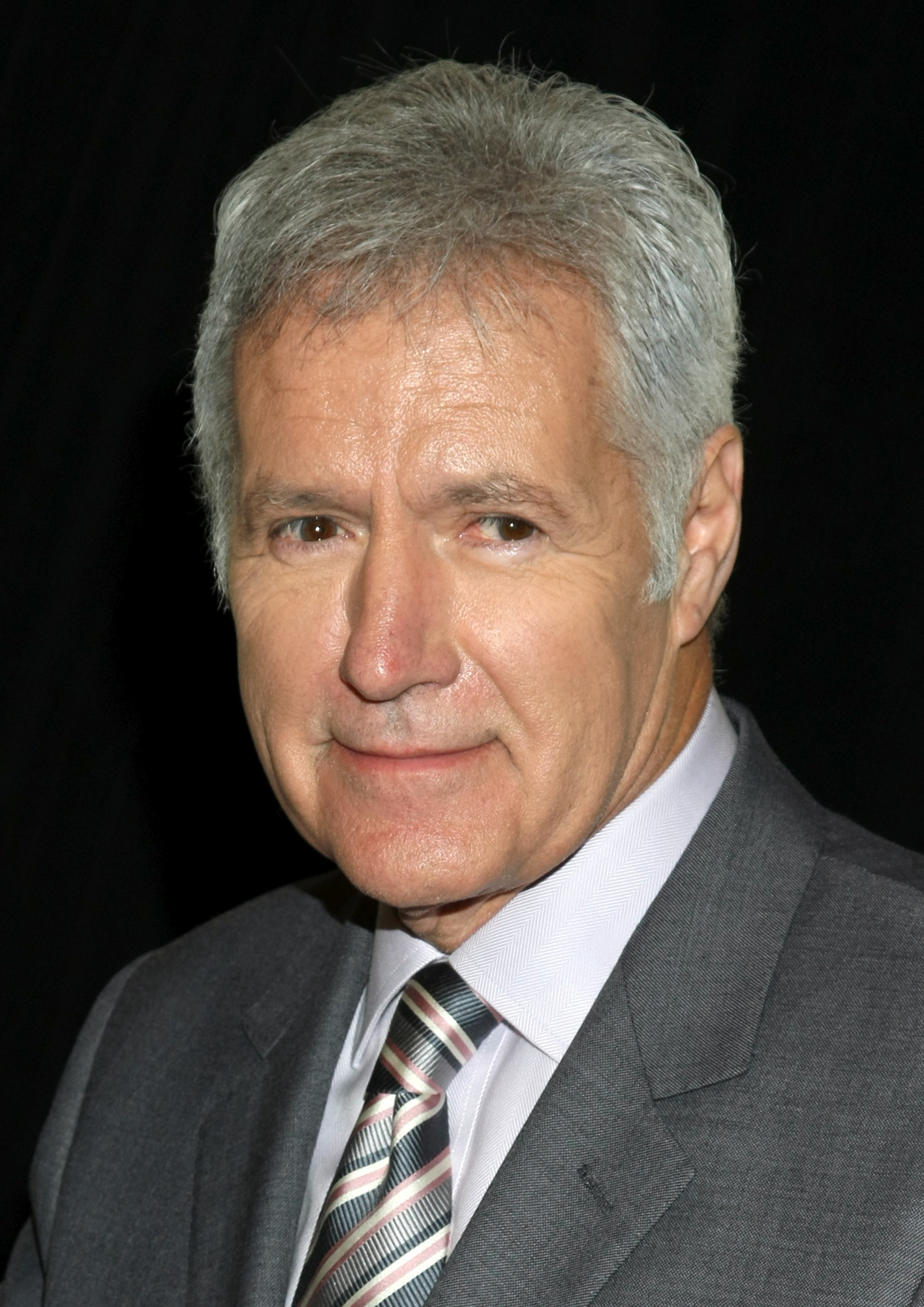
Alex Trebek, Outstanding Game Show Host winner

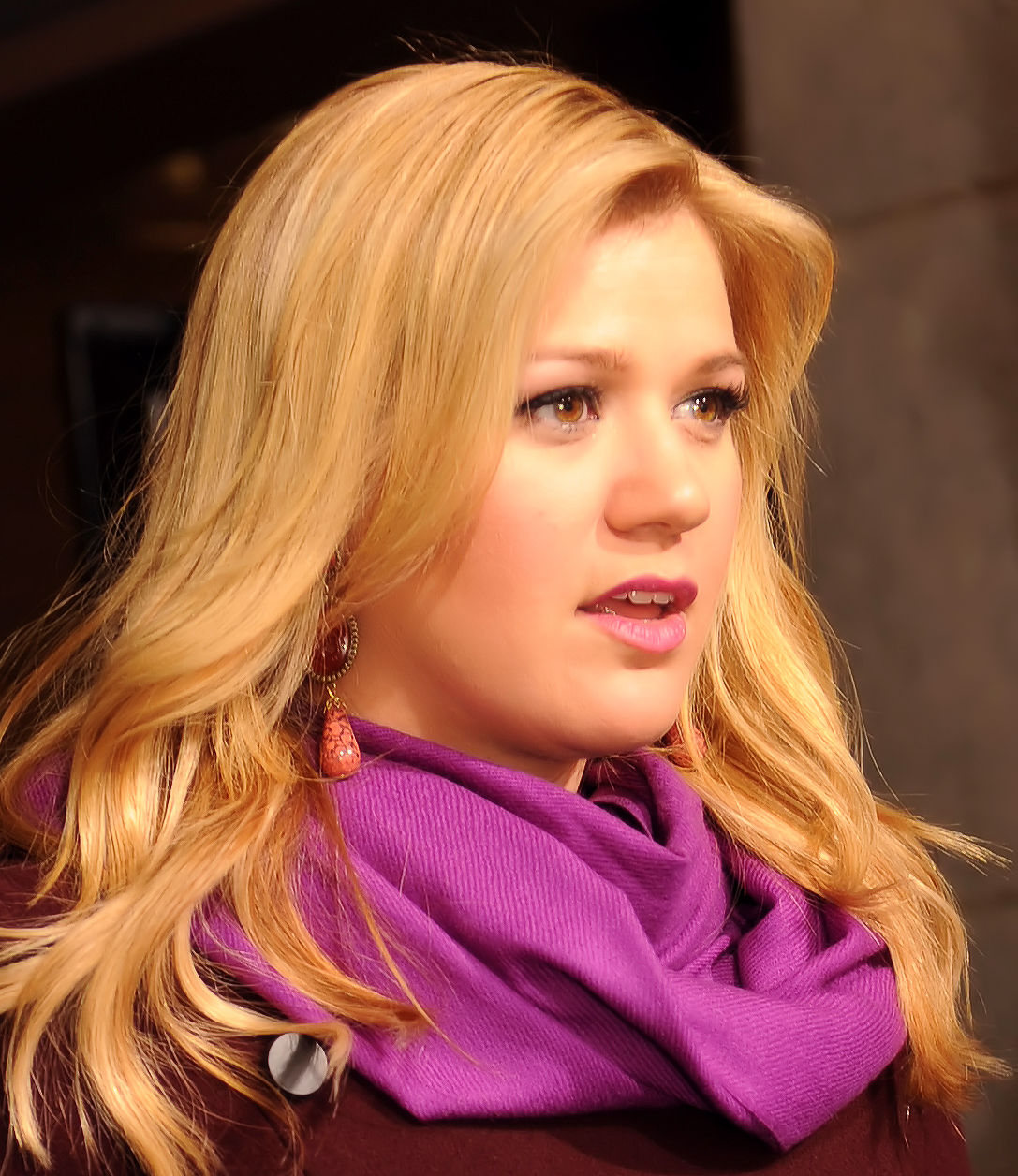
Kelly Clarkson, Outstanding Entertainment Talk Show Host winner

Nominations were announced on May 21, 2020. Winners in each category are listed first, in boldface.

Category	Nominees
Outstanding Drama Series	**The Young and the Restless (CBS)**; The Bold and the Beautiful (CBS); Days of Our Lives (NBC); General Hospital (ABC)
Outstanding Digital Daytime Drama Series	**The Bay: The Series (Tubi)**; After Forever (Amazon Prime); Dark/Web (Amazon Prime); EastSiders (Netflix); Studio City (Amazon Prime)
Outstanding Game Show	**Jeopardy! (Syndication)**; Are You Smarter Than A 5th Grader? (Nickelodeon); Double Dare (Nickelodeon); Family Feud (Syndication); The Price Is Right (CBS)
Outstanding Legal/Courtroom Program	**The People's Court (Syndication)**; Hot Bench (Syndication); Judge Judy (Syndication); Judge Mathis (Syndication); Lauren Lake's Paternity Court (Syndication)
Outstanding Morning Program	**Today (NBC)**; CBS Sunday Morning (CBS); CBS This Morning (CBS); Good Morning America (ABC); Sunday Today with Willie Geist (NBC)
Outstanding Talk Show/Informative	**The View (ABC)**; The 3rd Hour of Today (NBC); Rachael Ray (Syndication); Red Table Talk (Facebook Watch); Today with Hoda & Jenna (NBC)
Outstanding Talk Show/Entertainment	**The Ellen DeGeneres Show (Syndication)**; GMA3: Strahan, Sara and Keke (ABC); The Kelly Clarkson Show (Syndication); Live with Kelly and Ryan (Syndication); The Talk (CBS)
Outstanding Entertainment News Program	**Entertainment Tonight (Syndication)**; Access Hollywood (Syndication); E! News (E!); Extra (Syndication); Inside Edition (Syndication)
Outstanding Culinary Program	**Giada Entertains (Food Network)**; Barefoot Contessa (Food Network); Milkstreet (PBS); 30 Minute Meals (Food Network); Valerie's Home Cooking (Food Network)
Outstanding Lead Actress in a Drama Series	**Heather Tom as Katie Logan, The Bold and the Beautiful (CBS)**; Finola Hughes as Anna Devane, General Hospital (ABC); Katherine Kelly Lang as Brooke Logan, The Bold and the Beautiful (CBS); Maura West as Ava Jerome, General Hospital (ABC); Arianne Zucker as Nicole Walker, Days of Our Lives (NBC)
Outstanding Lead Actor in a Drama Series	**Jason Thompson as Billy Abbott, The Young and the Restless (CBS)**; Steve Burton as Jason Morgan, General Hospital (ABC); Thorsten Kaye as Ridge Forrester, The Bold and the Beautiful (CBS); Jon Lindstrom as Kevin Collins/Ryan Chamberlain, General Hospital (ABC); Thaao Penghlis as Tony DiMera, Days of Our Lives (NBC)
Outstanding Supporting Actress in a Drama Series	**Tamara Braun as Dr Kim Nero, General Hospital (ABC)**; Rebecca Budig as Hayden Barnes, General Hospital (ABC); Susan Seaforth Hayes as Julie Williams, Days of Our Lives (NBC); Christel Khalil as Lily Winters, The Young and the Restless (CBS); Annika Noelle as Hope Logan, The Bold and the Beautiful (CBS)
Outstanding Supporting Actor in a Drama Series	**Bryton James as Devon Hamilton, The Young and the Restless (CBS)**; Mark Grossman as Adam Newman, The Young and the Restless (CBS); Wally Kurth as Justin Kiriakis, Days of Our Lives (NBC); Chandler Massey as Will Horton, Days of Our Lives (NBC); James Patrick Stuart as Valentin Cassadine, General Hospital (ABC); Paul Telfer as Xander Kiriakis, Days of Our Lives (NBC)
Outstanding Younger Performer in a Drama Series	**Olivia Rose Keegan as Claire Brady, Days of Our Lives (NBC)**; Sasha Calle as Lola Rosales, The Young and the Restless (CBS); Katelyn MacMullen as Willow Tait, General Hospital (ABC); Eden McCoy as Josslyn Jacks, General Hospital (ABC); Thia Megia as Haley Chen, Days of Our Lives (NBC)
Outstanding Guest Performer in a Drama Series	**Eva LaRue as Celeste Rosales, The Young and the Restless (CBS)**; Elissa Kapneck as Sasha, The Young and the Restless (CBS); Michael E. Knight as Martin Grey, General Hospital (ABC); Jeffrey Vincent Parise as Simon Black, The Young and the Restless (CBS); Chrishell Stause as Jordan Ridgeway, Days of Our Lives (NBC)
Outstanding Principal Performance in a Daytime Program	**Ryan Dillon as Elmo, Lefty the Salesman, Don Music, Sesame Street’s 50th Anniversary Celebration (HBO)**; Liana Liberato as McKenna Brady, Light as a Feather (Hulu); Damian Toofeek Raven as Chadwick Williams, The Chadwick Journals, Season 3: Oren (Amazon Prime Video); Jordan Rodrigues as Trey Emory, Light as a Feather (Hulu); Brianne Tju as Alex Portnoy, Light as a Feather (Hulu)
Outstanding Game Show Host	**Alex Trebek, Jeopardy! (Syndication)**; Wayne Brady, Let's Make a Deal (CBS); Steve Harvey, Family Feud (Syndication); Alfonso Ribeiro, Catch 21 (Game Show Network); Pat Sajak, Wheel of Fortune (Syndication)
Outstanding Informative Talk Show Host	**Tamron Hall, Tamron Hall (Syndication)**; Whoopi Goldberg, Joy Behar, Sunny Hostin, Meghan McCain, Abby Huntsman, and Ana Navarro, The View (ABC); Larry King, Larry King Now (Ora TV); Hoda Kotb and Jenna Bush Hager, Today with Hoda & Jenna (NBC); Jada Pinkett Smith, Willow Smith, and Adrienne Banfield-Norris, Red Table Talk (Facebook Watch)
Outstanding Entertainment Talk Show Host	**Kelly Clarkson, The Kelly Clarkson Show (Syndication)**; Michael Strahan, Sara Haines, and Keke Palmer, GMA3: Strahan, Sara and Keke (ABC); Kelly Ripa and Ryan Seacrest, Live with Kelly and Ryan (Syndication); Maury Povich, Maury (Syndication); Sara Gilbert, Sharon Osbourne, Sheryl Underwood, Eve, Carrie Ann Inaba, and Marie Osmond, The Talk (CBS)
Outstanding Drama Series Writing Team	The Bold and the Beautiful (CBS): Head writer: Bradley P. Bell; Co-head writer: Michael Minnis; Writers: Rex M. Best; Shannon Bradley; Adam Dusevoir; Tracey Ann Kelly; Patrick Mulcahey; Mark Pinciotti; Michele Val Jean; Days of Our Lives (NBC): Head writer: Ron Carlivati; Creative consultant: Ryan Quan; Script editor: Fran Myers; Script writers: Joanna Cohen; Carolyn Culliton; Richard Culliton; David Kreizman; Rebecca McCarty; Katherine Schock; Associate writers: Lorraine Broderick; Rick Draughon; Jeanne Marie Ford; Dave Ryan; Elizabeth Snyder; General Hospital (ABC): Head writers: Shelly Altman; Chris Van Etten; Daniel James O'Connor; Writers: Barbara Bloom; Anna Theresa Cascio; Suzanne Flynn; Charlotte Gibson; Lucky Gold; Kate Hall; Elizabeth Korte; Donny Sheldon; Scott Sickles; The Young and the Restless (CBS): Head writers: Josh Griffith; Mal Young; Writers: Amanda Beall; Jeff Beldner; James Harmon Brown; Sara Bibel; Matt Clifford; Annie Compton; Michael Conforti; Christopher Dunn; Sara Endsley; Janice Ferri Esser; Mellinda Hensley; Daran Little; Lynn Martin; Anne Schoettle; Natalie Minardi Slater; Teresa Zimmerman
Outstanding Drama Series Directing Team	General Hospital (ABC): Directors: Larry Carpenter; Tina Keller; William Ludel; Scott McKinsey; Gary Tomlin; Frank Valentini; Denise Van Cleave; Phideaux Xavier; Associate directors: Teresa Cicala; Peter Fillmore; Paul Glass; Marika Kushel; Dave MacLeod; Allison Reames Smith; Christine Magarian Ucar; Stage managers: Kyle Bell; Rob Markham; Craig McManus; Production associates: Jillian Dedote; Nate Hapke; The Bold and the Beautiful (CBS): Directors: Jennifer Howard; Anthony Pascarelli; Cynthia J. Popp; Associate directors: Jennifer Scott Christenson; Brian Connell; Clyde Kaplan; Catherine Sedwick; Stage managers: Jason Galland; Herbert Weaver; Lisa Winther-Huston; Production associates: Robin Adams; Erica Ginger; Rachel Herman; Days of Our Lives (NBC): Directors: Albert Alarr; Sonia Blangiardo-Goins; Grant Johnson; Noel Maxam; Scott McKinsey; Steven Williford; Associate directors: Kevin K. Church; Michael Fiamingo; Joseph H. Lumer; Jenée Muyeau; Lugh Powers; Stage managers: Francesca Bellini De Simone; Stuart W. Howard; Lucy Yalenian; Production associates: Jessie Harrison; Sara McCormick; Holly Metts; Alexis Straiten; The Young and the Restless (CBS): Directors: Michael Eilbaum; Sally McDonald; Owen Renfroe; Steven Williford; Associate directors: Derek Berlatsky; Andrew Hachem; Robbin Phillips; Stage managers: Fritz Brekeller; Brendan Higgins; Tom McDermott; Production associates: Ericka Chavez; Rebekah McCurry; Nancy Ortenberg
