= Laura Maria Censabella =

American playwright and screenwriter

- Occupation: Playwright
- Known for: Abandoned in Queens; Three Italian Women

Laura Maria Censabella is an American playwright and screenwriter. She has been awarded three grants from the New York Foundation for the Arts; two in playwriting for Abandoned in Queens and Three Italian Women, and The Geri Ashur Award in Screenwriting for her original screenplay Truly Mary. She is the Director of The Playwrights Unit of the Ensemble Studio Theatre

== Works and awards ==
Her short play Posing was nominated for a Pushcart Prize, and The Actual Footage won the 2000 Tennessee Chapbook Prize for Drama. Both plays are published in Poems & Plays. She has written the short film adaptation Physics for HBO's Women: Breaking The Rules series, and she has won two Daytime Emmy Awards for her work on As the World Turns. Her first Emmy win in 2001 was shared with Hogan Sheffer (head writer), Leah Laiman (head writer), Carolyn Culliton (co-head writer), Stephen Demorest, Hal Corley, Stephanie Braxton, Jeff Beldner, Tom Casiello, Susan Dansby, Judith Donato, Lynn Martin, Marie Masters, Richard J. Allen, Judy Tate, Courtney Sherman, and Karen Lewis.

Censabella's half-hour independent film Last Call (directed by Robert Bailey) has been an official selection in festivals throughout the world, including the Avignon Film Festival, Other Venice Film Festival, Hermosa Shorts Film Festival, Sedona International Film Festival, Anthology Film Archives, and the Breckenridge Film Festival where it won the Best Short Drama award.

Paradise, a two-actor play by Censabella, was a finalist for the 2016 Saroyan/Paul Playwriting Prize for Human Rights. In 2021, L.A. Theatre Works released an audio recording of Paradise, which was based on the 2019 Odyssey Theatre production produced by Viola Davis’ JuVee Productions in collaboration with American Oasis.

== Education ==
Censabella's teaching experience includes The New School for Drama, The Actors Studio Drama School (where she developed the playwriting program with Romulus Linney), Columbia University School of the Arts, Columbia College's Undergraduate Writing Program, City University's MFA Writing Program, The Sewanee Writers' Conference, and Summer Literary Seminars.

She is a member of the Dramatists Guild and the Writers Guild of America, East, and graduated from Yale University.
