= 72nd Writers Guild of America Awards =

72nd WGA Awards
- Date: February 1, 2020
- Organized by: Writers Guild of America, East and the Writers Guild of America, West

The 72nd Writers Guild of America Awards honored the best writing in film, television and radio of 2019. Nominees for television and radio were announced on December 5, 2019, while nominees for film were announced on January 6, 2020. Winners were announced on February 1, 2020 in joint ceremonies at the Beverly Hilton Hotel in Beverly Hills, California and in the Edison Ballroom at the Hotel Edison in New York City, New York. The ceremonies were hosted by Ana Gasteyer (Beverly Hilton) and John Fugelsang (Edison Ballroom).

== Nominees ==
=== Film ===
Best Original Screenplay

Parasite (Neon) — Bong Joon-ho and Han Jin-won; story by Bong Joon-ho †

- 1917 (Universal Pictures) – Sam Mendes & Krysty Wilson-Cairns
- Booksmart (United Artists Releasing) – Emily Halpern & Sarah Haskins and Susanna Fogel and Katie Silberman
- Knives Out (Lionsgate) – Rian Johnson
- Marriage Story (Netflix) – Noah Baumbach
Best Adapted Screenplay

Jojo Rabbit (Fox Searchlight) – Taika Waititi; based on the book Caging Skies by Christine Leunens †

- A Beautiful Day in the Neighborhood (TriStar Pictures) – Micah Fitzerman-Blue & Noah Harpster; inspired by the article "Can You Say...Hero?" by Tom Junod
- The Irishman (Netflix) – Steven Zaillian; based on the book I Heard You Paint Houses by Charles Brandt
- Joker (Warner Bros. Pictures) – Todd Phillips & Scott Silver; based on characters from DC Comics
- Little Women (Sony Pictures) — Greta Gerwig; based on the novel by Louisa May Alcott
Best Documentary Screenplay

The Inventor: Out for Blood in Silicon Valley (HBO Documentary Films) – Alex Gibney

- Citizen K (Greenwich Entertainment) – Alex Gibney
- Foster (HBO Documentary Films) – Mark Jonathan Harris
- Joseph Pulitzer: Voice of the People (First Run Features) – Robert Seidman & Oren Rudavsky
- The Kingmaker (Showtime Documentary Films) – Lauren Greenfield

=== Television ===
Drama Series

Succession (HBO) – Jesse Armstrong, Alice Birch, Jon Brown, Jonathan Glatzer, Cord Jefferson, Mary Laws, Lucy Prebble, Georgia Pritchett, Tony Roche, Gary Shteyngart, Susan Soon He Stanton, and Will Tracy

- The Crown (Netflix) – James Graham, David Hancock, Peter Morgan
- The Handmaid's Tale (Hulu) – Marissa Jo Cerar, Yahlin Chang, Nina Fiore, Dorothy Fortenberry, Jacy Heldrich, John Herrera, Lynn Renee Maxcy, Bruce Miller, Kira Snyder, and Eric Tuchman
- Mindhunter (Netflix) – Pamela Cederquist, Joshua Donen, Marcus Gardley, Shaun Grant, Liz Hannah, Phillip Howze, Jason Johnson, Doug Jung, Colin Louro, Alex Metcalf, Courtenay Miles, Dominic Orlando, Joe Penhall, and Ruby Rae Spiegel
- Watchmen (HBO) – Lila Byock, Nick Cuse, Christal Henry, Branden Jacobs-Jenkins, Cord Jefferson, Jeff Jensen, Claire Kiechel, Damon Lindelof, Stacy Osei-Kuffour, Tom Spezialy, and Carly Wray
Comedy Series

Barry (HBO) – Alec Berg, Duffy Boudreau, Bill Hader, Emily Heller, Jason Kim, Taofik Kolade, and Elizabeth Sarnoff

- The Marvelous Mrs. Maisel (Amazon Prime Video) – Kate Fodor, Noah Gardenswartz, Daniel Goldfarb, Alison Leiby, Daniel Palladino, Sono Patel, Amy Sherman-Palladino, and Jordan Temple
- PEN15 (Hulu) – Jeff Chan, Maya Erskine, Anna Konkle, Gabe Liedman, Stacy Osei-Kuffour, Andrew Rhymer, Jessica Watson, and Sam Zvibleman
- Russian Doll (Netflix) – Jocelyn Bioh, Flora Birnbaum, Cirocco Dunlap, Leslye Headland, Natasha Lyonne, Amy Poehler, Tami Sagher, and Allison Silverman
- Veep (HBO) – Gabrielle Allan-Greenberg, Rachel Axler, Emilia Barrosse, Ted Cohen, Jennifer Crittenden, Alex Gregory, Steve Hely, Peter Huyck, Dan O'Keefe, Erik Kenward, Billy Kimball, David Mandel, Ian Maxtone-Graham, Dan Mintz, Lew Morton, Georgia Pritchett, and Leila Strachan
New Series

Watchmen (HBO) – Lila Byock, Nick Cuse, Christal Henry, Branden Jacobs-Jenkins, Cord Jefferson, Jeff Jensen, Claire Kiechel, Damon Lindelof, Stacy Osei-Kuffour, Tom Spezialy, and Carly Wray

- Dead to Me (Netflix) – Rebecca Addelman, Njeri Brown, Liz Feldman, Kelly Hutchinson, Anthony King, Emma Rathbone, Kate Robin, and Abe Sylvia
- PEN15 (Hulu) – Jeff Chan, Maya Erskine, Anna Konkle, Gabe Liedman, Stacy Osei-Kuffour, Andrew Rhymer, Jessica Watson, and Sam Zvibleman
- Russian Doll (Netflix) – Jocelyn Bioh, Flora Birnbaum, Cirocco Dunlap, Leslye Headland, Natasha Lyonne, Amy Poehler, Tami Sagher, and Allison Silverman
- What We Do in the Shadows (FX) – Jesse Armstrong, Sam Bain, Jemaine Clement, Josh Lieb, Iain Morris, Stefani Robinson, Duncan Sarkies, Marika Sawyer, Tom Scharpling, Paul Simms, and Taika Waititi
Long Form – Original

Chernobyl (HBO) – Craig Mazin

- The Terror (AMC) – Max Borenstein, Alessandra DiMona, Shannon Goss, Steven Hanna, Naomi Iizuka, Benjamin Klein, Danielle Roderick, Tony Tost, and Alexander Woo
- Togo (Disney+) – Tom Flynn
- True Detective (HBO) – Alessandra DiMona, Graham Gordy, Gabriel Hobson, David Milch, and Nic Pizzolatto
Long Form – Adapted

Fosse/Verdon (FX) – Debora Cahn, Joel Fields, Ike Holter, Thomas Kail, Steven Levenson, Charlotte Stoudt, Tracey Scott Wilson; Based on the book Fosse by Sam Wasson

- El Camino: A Breaking Bad Movie (Netflix) – Vince Gilligan
- The Loudest Voice (Showtime) – John Harrington Bland, Laura Eason, Tom McCarthy, Alex Metcalf, Gabriel Sherman, Jennifer Stahl; Source material: Gabriel Sherman
- Unbelievable (Netflix) – Michael Chabon, Susannah Grant, Becky Mode, Jennifer Schuur, Ayelet Waldman; Source material: Various (Note: Based on the ProPublica and The Marshall Project article "An Unbelievable Story of Rape" and This American Life radio episode "Anatomy of Doubt".)
Short Form New Media – Original

Special (Netflix) – Ryan O'Connell

- After Forever (Amazon Prime Video) – Michael Slade and Kevin Spirtas
Animation

"Thanksgiving of Horror" – The Simpsons (Fox) – Dan Vebber

- "Bed, Bob & Beyond" – Bob's Burgers (Fox) – Kelvin Yu
- "The Gene Mile" – Bob's Burgers (Fox) – Steven Davis
- "Go Big or Go Homer" – The Simpsons (Fox) – John Frink
- "A Horse Walks Into a Rehab" – BoJack Horseman (Netflix) – Elijah Aron
- "Livin La Pura Vida" – The Simpsons (Fox) – Brian Kelley
Episodic Drama

"Tern Haven" – Succession (HBO) – Will Tracy

- "407 Proxy Authentication Required" – Mr. Robot (USA Network) – Sam Esmail
- "A Good Man is Hard to Find" – Ray Donovan (Showtime) – Joshua Marston
- "Mirror Mirror" – The OA (Netflix) – Dominic Orlando and Claire Kiechel
- "Moondust" – The Crown (Netflix) – Peter Morgan
- "Our Little Island Girl" – This Is Us (NBC) – Eboni Freeman
Episodic Comedy

"Pilot" – Dead to Me (Netflix) – Liz Feldman

- "Here's Where We Get Off" – Orange Is the New Black (Netflix) – Jenji Kohan
- "It's Comedy or Cabbage" – The Marvelous Mrs. Maisel (Amazon Prime Video) – Amy Sherman-Palladino
- "Nice Knowing You" – Living with Yourself (Netflix) – Timothy Greenberg
- "The Stinker Thinker" – On Becoming a God in Central Florida (Showtime) – Robert F. Funke and Matt Lutsky
- "Veep" – Veep (HBO) – David Mandel
Comedy/Variety – Talk Series

Last Week Tonight with John Oliver (HBO) – Senior writers: Dan Gurewitch, Jeff Maurer, Jill Twiss, Juli Weiner; Writers: Daniel O'Brien, Tim Carvell, John Oliver, Owen Parsons, Charlie Redd, Joanna Rothkopf, Ben Silva, and Seena Vali

- Conan (TBS) – Head writer: Matt O'Brien; Writers: Jose Arroyo, Glenn Boozan, Daniel Cronin, Andres du Bouchet, Conan O'Brien, Jessie Gaskell, Brian Kiley, Laurie Kilmartin, Todd Levin, Levi MacDougall, Andy Richter, Frank Smiley, and Mike Sweeney
- Full Frontal with Samantha Bee (TBS) – Head writer: Melinda Taub; Supervising writers: Joe Grossman, Nicole Silverberg; Writers: Samantha Bee, Kristen Bartlett, Pat Cassels, Sean Crespo, Mike Drucker, Mathan Erhardt, Miles Kahn, Sahar Rizvi; Special contributor: Allison Silverman
- The Late Late Show with James Corden (CBS) – Writers: Demi Adejuyigbe, James Corden, Rob Crabbe, Lawrence Dai, Nate Fernald, Caroline Goldfarb, Olivia Harewood, David Javerbaum, Ian Karmel, John Kennedy, Kayleigh Lamb, James Longman, Jared Moskowitz, CeCe Pleasants, Tim Siedell, Benjamin Stout, Tom Thriveni, Louis Waymouth, and Ben Winston
- Late Night with Seth Meyers (NBC) – Supervising Writers: Sal Gentile, Seth Reiss; Writers: Jermaine Affonso, Alex Baze, Karen Chee, Bryan Donaldson, Matt Goldich, Dina Gusovsky, Jenny Hagel, Allison Hord, Mike Karnell, John Lutz, Seth Meyers, Ian Morgan, Amber Ruffin, Mike Scollins, Mike Shoemaker, and Ben Warheit
- The Late Show with Stephen Colbert (CBS) – Head Writers: Jay Katsir, Opus Moreschi; Writers: Michael Brumm, River Clegg, Aaron Cohen, Stephen Colbert, Paul Dinello, Ariel Dumas, Glenn Eichler, Django Gold, Gabe Gronli, Greg Iwinski, Barry Julien, Daniel Kibblesmith, Eliana Kwartler, Matt Lappin, Asher Perlman, Tom Purcell, Kate Sidley, Jen Spyra, Brian Stack, and John Thibodeaux
Comedy/Variety – Specials

Full Frontal with Samantha Bee Presents: Not the White House Correspondents' Dinner Part 2 (TBS) – Head writer: Melinda Taub; Supervising writers: Joe Grossman, Nicole Silverberg; Writers: Samantha Bee, Kristen Bartlett, Pat Cassels, Sean Crespo, Mike Drucker, Mathan Erhardt, Miles Kahn, Sahar Rizvi; Special contributor: Allison Silverman

- Desi Lydic: Abroad (Comedy Central) – Devin Delliquanti and Lauren Sarver
- The Late Late Show Carpool Karaoke Primetime Special 2019 (CBS) – Head writers: Lauren Greenberg, Ian Karmel; Writers: Demi Adejuyigbe, James Corden, Rob Crabbe, Lawrence Dai, Nate Fernald, Caroline Goldfarb, John Kennedy, James Longman, Jared Moskowitz, CeCe Pleasants, Tim Siedell, Benjamin Stout, Tom Thriveni, Louis Waymouth, and Ben Winston
- Ramy Youssef: Feelings (HBO) – Ramy Youssef
Comedy/Variety – Sketch Series

I Think You Should Leave with Tim Robinson (Netflix) – Jeremy Beiler, Zach Kanin, Tim Robinson, and John Solomon

- At Home with Amy Sedaris (truTV) – Cole Escola, Amy Sedaris, and Allison Silverman
- Saturday Night Live (NBC) – Head writers: Michael Che, Colin Jost, Kent Sublette; Supervising writers: Anna Drezen, Fran Gillespie, Sudi Green, Streeter Seidell; Senior writer: Bryan Tucker; Weekend Update Head writer: Pete Schultz; Writers: James Anderson, Neal Brennan, Andrew Briedis, Megan Callahan, Steve Castillo, Emma Clark, Andrew Dismukes, Alison Gates, Tim Herlihy, Steve Higgins, Sam Jay, Erik Kenward, Steve Koren, Rob Klein, Michael Koman, Dan Licata, Alan Linic, Eli Coyote Mandal, Dave McCary, Dennis McNicholas, Lorne Michaels, John Mulaney, Jasmin Pierce, Josh Patten, Katie Rich, Simon Rich, Gary Richardson, Marika Sawyer, Robert Smigel, Mark Steinbach, Will Stephen, Julio Torres, and Bowen Yang
Quiz and Audience Participation

Are You Smarter Than a 5th Grader? (Nickelodeon) – Head writer: Bret Calvert; Writers: Seth Harrington and Rosemarie DiSalvo

- Hollywood Game Night (NBC) – Head writers: Ann Slichter, Grant Taylor; Writers: Michael Agbabian, Marshall Davis, Allie Kokesh, and Dwight D. Smith
- Jeopardy! (ABC) – Matthew Caruso, John Duarte, Harry Friedman, Mark Gaberman, Debbie Griffin, Michele Loud, Robert McClenaghan, Jim Rhine, Steve D. Tamerius, and Billy Wisse
- Who Wants to Be a Millionaire (Disney/ABC Syndication) – Head writer: Stephen A. Melcher Jr.; Writers: Kyle Beakley, Patricia A. Cotter, Ryan Hopak, Gary Lucy, James Rowley, and Ann Slichter
Daytime Drama

The Young and the Restless (CBS) – Writers: Amanda L. Beall, Jeff Beldner, Sara Bibel, Matt Clifford, Annie Compton, Christopher Dunn, Sara Endsley, Janice Ferri Esser, Mellinda Hensley, Lynn Martin, Anne Schoettle, Natalie Minardi Slater, and Teresa Zimmerman

- Days of Our Lives (NBC) – Writers: Lorraine Broderick, Ron Carlivati, Joanna Cohen, Carolyn Culliton, Richard Culliton, Rick Draughon, David Kreizman, Rebecca McCarty, Ryan Quan, Dave Ryan, Betsy Snyder, and Katie Schock
- General Hospital (ABC) – Head writers: Shelly Altman, Christopher Van Etten; Associate head writers: Anna T. Cascio, Dan O'Connor; Writers: Barbara Bloom, Suzanne Flynn, Charlotte Gibson, Lucky Gold, Kate Hall, Elizabeth Korte, Donny Sheldon, and Scott Sickles

==== Children's ====
Children's Script – Episodic, Long form and Specials

"Remember Black Elvis?" – Family Reunion (Netflix) – Howard Jordan Jr.

- "It's Just... Weird" – Alexa & Katie (Netflix) – Romi Barta
- "Remember How This All Started?" – Family Reunion (Netflix) – Meg DeLoatch
- "Stupid Binder" – Alexa & Katie (Netflix) – Nancy Cohen
- "Time to Make... My Move" – Jim Henson's The Dark Crystal: Age of Resistance (Netflix) – Javier Grillo-Marxuach

==== Documentary ====
Documentary Script – Current Events

"Trump's Trade War" – Frontline (PBS) – Marcela Gaviria

- "Coal's Deadly Dust" – Frontline (PBS) – Elaine McMillion Sheldon
- "The Mueller Investigation" – Frontline (PBS) – Michael Kirk and Mike Wiser
Documentary Script – Other than Current Events

"Chasing The Moon Part One: A Place Beyond The Sky" – American Experience (PBS) – Robert Stone

- "Right To Fail" – Frontline (PBS) – Tom Jennings
- "Supreme Revenge" – Frontline (PBS) – Michael Kirk and Mike Wiser

==== News ====
News Script – Regularly Scheduled, Bulletin, or Breaking Report

"Terror in America: The Massacres in El Paso and Dayton" – Special Edition of the CBS Evening News (CBS News) – Jerry Cipriano, Joe Clines, and Bob Meyer

News Script – Analysis, Feature, or Commentary

"Fly like an Eagle" – 60 Minutes (CBS News) – Scott Pelley, Katie Kerbstat, and Nicole Young

- "Atlanta, EP. 3" – A King's Place (TheRoot.com) – Jessica Moulite
- "Tis the Season: Here's How Jesus Became So Widely Accepted as White" – (TheRoot.com) – Joon Chung, Felice León, and Ashley Velez
- "Toxic Water Crisis Still This Haunts New York Town" – (HuffPost.com) – Lena Jackson
Digital News

"Stories About My Brother" (Jezebel.com) – Prachi Gupta

- "A Gridiron of Their Own" (Deadspin.com) – Kelsey McKinney

=== Radio ===
Radio News Script – Regularly Scheduled, Bulletin, or Breaking Report

"Hail and Farewell: Remembering Some Headline Makers" (CBS News Radio) – Gail Lee

- "CBS News on the Hour with Norah O'Donnell – El Paso, Texas and Dayton, Ohio – Communities in Mourning" (CBS News Radio) – James Hutton
- "World News This Week, August 9, 2019" (ABC News Radio) – Stephanie Pawlowski and Jim Ryan
- "World News This Week, September 13, 2019" (ABC News Radio) – Joan B. Harris
Radio News Script – Analysis, Feature, or Commentary

"The Enduring Legacy of Jackie Kennedy Onassis" (CBS News Radio) – Dianne E. James and Gail Lee

- "Woodstock: Back to the Garden" (CBS News Radio) – Gail Lee

=== Promotional writing ===
On-Air Promotion – Television or Radio

"Star Trek: Picard" and "All Rise Promos" (CBS) – Jessica Katzenstein

- "CBS Promos" (CBS) – Molly Neylan
- "Star. Kill. Evil. FBI." (CBS) – Ralph Buado

=== Special awards ===
Paul Selvin Award

Charles Randolph

Laurel Award for Screenwriting Achievement

Nancy Meyers

Laurel Award for TV Writing Achievement

Merrill Markoe
