= Leah Laiman =

American screenwriter

- Born: August 29, 1946 (age 79); Tel Aviv, Israel
- Occupations: Writer, novelist

Leah Laiman (born August 29, 1946 in Tel Aviv, Israel) is an American soap opera writer and romance novelist.

== Career ==
Laiman got her start on daytime television during the early 1980s at General Hospital. Laiman succeeded former Head Writer, Pat Falken Smith, along with novelist Thom Racina. The pair began working on the show during its heyday, including Luke Spencer and Laura Webber's widely publicized 1981 wedding, which included notable Hollywood legend Elizabeth Taylor. After three years on GH, Laiman followed Racina to Days of Our Lives to work with Sheri Anderson where the three wrote several stories, including Bo and Hope's wedding in England, and co-created the characters of Steve "Patch" Johnson and John Black. In 1986, Laiman became the sole head writer and creator of the Jack Deveraux character, and further developed the popular romance of Steve Johnson and Kayla Brady.

After Days of our Lives, Laiman moved to One Life to Live, where she stayed as staff writer from 1990 through 1997 and served as head writer from 1990 to 1991, and again from 1996 to 1997. In 1998, she took a job at the ailing NBC Daytime serial Another World. The show was cancelled in June 1999. Her next job was at As the World Turns. In 2000, Laiman was fired from ATWT and turned to writing novels for five years. Laiman was rehired on As the World Turns in 2005 as an associate head writer.

In 2020 she was one of the recruits for a fiction app named "Radish" which had $63m of funding and it was opening an office in LA. The soap writers recruited included Laiman, Addie Walsh, Lisa Connor and Jean Passanante.

== Positions held ==
Another World

- Co-Head Writer (1998–25 June 1999)
- The Last AW Writing Team: Leah Laiman (Head Writer, Jean Passanante (co-Head Writer), Stephen Demorest, Melissa Salmons, Laura Maria Censabella, Judy Tate, Tom Wiggin, Tom King, Maura Penders, Richard Culliton, Shelly Altman, Carolyn Culliton, Richard J. Allen, Sofia Landon Geier, Lynn Martin, Gillian Spencer, Mary Sue Price, Edwin Klein, Gordon Rayfield, Courtney Simon, Eleanor Labine

As the World Turns

- Associate Head Writer (1997 - 1998; March 3, 2005 - 2005; October 6, 2009 - September 17, 2010)
- Co-Head Writer (2005 - January 24, 2008; April 18, 2008 - October 5, 2009)
- Head Writer (August 1999 - August 2000)

Days of Our Lives

- Associate Head Writer (1991)
- Head Writer (1988–1989)
- Co-Head Writer (1986–1988)

General Hospital

- Writer (1981–1984)

Guiding Light

- Associate Head Writer (1993)
- Co-Head Writer (1994 – November 1994)

One Life to Live

- Co-Head Writer (1996–1998)

== Awards and nominations ==
=== Daytime Emmy Awards ===
WINS

- (2001; Best Writing; As the World Turns)

NOMINATIONS

- (1983 & 1984; Best Writing; General Hospital)
- (1985 & 1987; Best Writing; Days of Our Lives)
- (1990; Best Writing; One Life to Live)
- (2000, 2006, 2010 & 2011; Best Writing; As the World Turns)

=== Writers Guild of America Award ===
WINS

- (2007, 2009 & 2011 seasons; As the World Turns)

NOMINATIONS

- (1988 & 1992 seasons; Days of Our Lives)
- (1995 season; Guiding Light)
- (2006, 2008 & 2010 seasons; As the World Turns)

== Head writing tenure ==
Preceded by Sheri Anderson; Thom Racina	Head Writer of Days of Our Lives (with Sheri Anderson: December 3, 1984 – November 10, 1986) (with Thom Racina: December 3, 1984 – November 18, 1986); December 3, 1984 – March 16, 1989	Succeeded by Anne Howard Bailey
Preceded by Stephen Demorest; Patrick Mulcahey; Nancy Williams Watt	Head Writer of Guiding Light (with Stephen Demorest, Millee Taggart, and Nancy Williams Watt) (with Patrick Mulcahey: June 6, 1994 – September 2, 1994); June 6, 1994 – October 25, 1994	Succeeded by Stephen Demorest and Millee Taggart
Preceded by Jean Passanante	Head Writer of Another World (with Jean Passanante); July 1998 – June 25, 1999	Succeeded by none
Preceded by Lorraine Broderick; Hal Corley; Addie Walsh	Head Writer of As the World Turns (with Carolyn Culliton); June 1999 – June 12, 2000	Succeeded by Hogan Sheffer; Carolyn Culliton; Hal Corley; Stephen Demorest
Preceded by Michael Malone	Head Writer of One Life to Live (with Jean Passanante and Peggy Sloane); April 1996 – December 1996	Succeeded by Jean Passanante; Peggy Sloane
Preceded by Hogan Sheffer; Jean Passanante	Head Writer of As the World Turns (with Jean Passanante) (with Christopher Whitesell: May 25, 2005 – October 17, 2007); May 25, 2005 – January 24, 2008	Succeeded by Christopher Goutman (WGA Strike)
Preceded by Christopher Goutman (WGA Strike)	Head Writer of As the World Turns (with Jean Passanante); April 18, 2008 – October 5, 2009	Succeeded by Jean Passanante; David Kreizman
