= Covino =

Covino is an Italian surname. Notable people with the surname include:

- Christina Covino, American screenwriter
- Michael Angelo Covino (born 1984), American actor, filmmaker, and producer
- Steve Covino (born 1989), American soccer player
