= Jean Passanante =

American television screenwriter

- Born: June 26, 1953 (age 73); St. Louis, Missouri, U.S.
- Education: Dartmouth College
- Occupations: Actress; screenwriter
- Years active: 1980–2017
- Known for: Head writer for: All My Children; Another World; One Life to Live; As The World Turns; The Young & The Restless
- Spouse: Jack Shannon (m. 1985)
- Children: 1
- Writing career
- Genre: Soap opera

Jean Passanante (born June 26, 1953) is an American television screenwriter, best known for her work in daytime soap operas. Passanante got her start as an actress doing bit parts in the 1980s, including the John Sayles' films Return of the Secaucus 7 and Lianna. She later became a soap opera writer.

== Early life ==
Passanante was born on June 26, 1953, in St. Louis, Missouri, one of three daughters born to Bart, a physician, and Alberta Passanante. Her sisters are Joy and Judy.

She graduated from Ladue Horton Watkins High School in 1971. She attended Dartmouth College.

== Career ==
=== Acting ===
Passanante was in Return of the Secaucus 7 (1980) and Lianna (1983), both John Sayles films.

Passanante had met Sayles through their theatre collaborations. She continued producing, including a four-year stint in the mid-80s as artistic director of the New York Theatre Workshop.

=== Writing ===
Passanante got her start on soaps working as a staff writer on the ABC Daytime drama One Life to Live from 1992 to 1996. In 1996, she was promoted to the top position of Head Writer, only to be replaced in 1997. She remained as a staff writer until 1998, at which time she was made co-Head Writer of the ailing soap opera Another World.

Passanante wrapped up the show's 35-year run in June 1999. The next month, she relieved All My Children creator Agnes Nixon of head writing duties after Nixon was called in to temporarily replace Megan McTavish.

Passanante's contract with All My Children expired in 2001, and she was replaced by Richard Culliton. She was then hired by CBS' As the World Turns in 2001, where she served as co-Head Writer (second in command to Hogan Sheffer) until she was promoted to Head Writer in early 2005; she continued in that role through the show's 2010 cancellation.

Following the cancellation of As the World Turns, Passanante returned to One Life to Live as Associate Head Writer, a role she held until 1998, until its television cancellation in January 2012. From January 25, 2008, through April 17, 2008, ATWT episodes were written by non-union writers due to Passanante and her team participating in the WGA strike. Passanante's post-strike episodes hit the airwaves on April 18, 2008.

Passanante was one of the writers who followed Ron Carlivati to General Hospital as breakdown writer from May 3, 2012, until November 25, 2013, when Passanante was named head writer of The Young and the Restless, working alongside Shelly Altman. Passanante's tenure was from December 23, 2013, to March 18, 2015, Passanante was also a breakdown writer for the show under Charles Pratt, Jr. from March 23, 2015, to June 18, 2015.

In July 2015, Passanante and Altman returned to General Hospital as its co-head writers, replacing Carlivati.

On June 6, 2017, Passanante announced her decision to retire from General Hospital, stating: "It gets to be a time when it’s just time. [...] And it seemed like the right time. I do have other things that I’m interested in pursuing and I have a daughter who lives in Europe, who I want to visit whenever I can. I have been pondering it for a long time. It’s a pretty consuming kind of job and you need to get your head clear of it every once in a while. It’s been a great 27 years, or something like that — it’s a long time!". Her retirement was reported in 2017, but in 2020 she was one of the recruits for a fiction app named "Radish" which had $63m of funding and it was opening an office in LA. The soap writers recruited included Passanante, Janet Iacobuzio, Addie Walsh, Lisa Connor and Leah Laiman.

== Personal life ==
In 1985, Passanante married writer Jack Shannon. They have one daughter, Ruth Shannon.

== Filmography ==
=== Acting ===
==== Film ====
Year	Title	Role	Notes	Ref.
1980	Return of the Secaucus 7	Irene	Drama film written and directed by John Sayles	
1983	Lianna	Rose	Drama film written and directed by John Sayles	

=== Writing ===
==== Television ====
Years held	Title	Position held	Notes	Ref.
1993–96	One Life to Live	Associate Head Writer		
1996–97	One Life to Live	Co-Head Writer	with Leah Laiman and Peggy Sloane	
1997–98	One Life to Live	Associate Head Writer		
1998 – 1999	Another World	Co-Head Writer	The Last AW Writing Team: Leah Laiman (Head Writer), Jean Passanante (Co-Head Writer), Stephen Demorest, Melissa Salmons, Laura Maria Censabella, Judy Tate, Tom Wiggin, Tom King, Maura Penders, Richard Culliton, Shelly Altman, Carolyn Culliton, Richard J. Allen, Sofia Landon Geier, Lynn Martin, Gillian Spencer, Mary Sue Price, Edwin Klein, Gordon Rayfield, Courtney Simon, Eleanor Labine	
1999 – 2001	All My Children	Co-Head Writer		
2001	All My Children	Head Writer		
2001 – 2005	As the World Turns	Co-Head Writer		
2005 – 2008	As the World Turns	Head writer		
2008 – 2009	As the World Turns	Head writer	with Leah Laiman	
2009 – 2010	As the World Turns	Head writer	with David Kreizman	
2010	As the World Turns	Head writer	with Lloyd Gold	
2010 - 2012	One Life to Live	Associate Head Writer		
2012 – 2013	General Hospital	Associate Head Writer		
2013 – 2015	The Young and the Restless	Co-Head Writer		
2015	The Young and the Restless	Breakdown Writer		
2015 – 2017	General Hospital	Co-Head Writer	with Shelly Altman	

== Awards and nominations ==
Daytime Emmy Awards:

- Win, 2014, Outstanding Drama Series Writing Team for The Young and the Restless
- Wins, 2002, 2004 and 2005, Outstanding Drama Series Writing Team for As the World Turns
- Nomination, 2003, Outstanding Drama Series Writing Team for As the World Turns
- Nomination, 2001 and 2002, Outstanding Drama Series Writing Team for All My Children
- Win, 1994, Outstanding Drama Series Writing Team for One Life to Live

Writers Guild of America Awards (WGA)

- Win, 2015 and 2016, Best Daytime Serial for General Hospital
- Win, 2007, Best Daytime Serial for As the World Turns
- Nominations, 2005 and 2006, Daytime Serials for As the World Turns
- Win, 2001 and 2002, Daytime Serials for All My Children
- Win, 1992 for "One Life to Live"

Preceded by Michael Malone	Co-Head Writer of One Life to Live (with Peggy Sloane) (with: Leah Laiman: April 1 — December 27, 1996); April 1, 1996 – June 27, 1997	Succeeded by Claire Labine; Matthew Labine
Preceded by Richard Culliton	Co-Head Writer of Another World (with Richard Culliton: May 18 – July 10, 1998) (with: Leah Laiman: July 27, 1998 – June 25, 1999); May 18, 1998 – June 25, 1999	Succeeded by Show Canceled
Preceded by Agnes Nixon; Elizabeth Page	Head Writer of All My Children (with Agnes Nixon: June 22, 1999 – December 15, 2000) (with Elizabeth Page: June 21, 1999 – November 25, 1999) (with Michael Conforti: May 1 – June 29, 2001); July 26, 1999 – August 17, 2001	Succeeded by Richard Culliton
Preceded by Hogan Sheffer; Carolyn Culliton; Hal Corley; Stephen Demorest	Head Writer of As the World Turns (with Hogan Sheffer: July 16, 2001 – May 24, 2005) (with Carolyn Culliton: July 16, 2001 – September 20, 2002) (with Leah Laiman: May 25, 2005 – January 24, 2008) (with Christopher Whitesell: May 25, 2005 – October 17, 2007); July 16, 2001 – January 24, 2008	Succeeded by WGA Strike
Preceded by WGA Strike	Head Writer of As the World Turns (with Leah Laiman: April 18, 2008 - October 5, 2009) (with David Kreizman: October 6, 2009 - June 4, 2010) (with Lloyd Gold: June 7, 2010 - September 17, 2010); April 18, 2008 – September 17, 2010	Succeeded by Show Canceled
Preceded by Shelly Altman; Tracey Thomson	Head Writer of The Young and the Restless (with Shelly Altman and Tracey Thomson) (with Charles Pratt Jr.: January 16, 2015 - March 18, 2015); December 23, 2013 – March 18, 2015	Succeeded by Charles Pratt Jr.
Preceded by Ron Carlivati	Co-Head Writer of General Hospital (with Shelly Altman: October 7, 2015 – October 6, 2017); October 6, 2015 – October 6, 2017	Succeeded by Shelly Altman & Chris Van Etten
