= Karen Lewis (disambiguation) =

Karen Lewis was an American labor leader who served as president of the Chicago Teachers Union from 2010 to 2014.

Karen Lewis may also refer to:

- Karen Lewis (screenwriter) (born 1950s), American television soap opera writer
- Karen Lewis Young (born 1951), member of the Maryland Senate since 2023
- Karen Lewis, actress and spouse of Michael Attenborough
