= Jan Leighton =

American actor (1921–2009)

- Born: Milton Lichtman; December 27, 1921; The Bronx, New York, U.S.
- Died: November 16, 2009 (aged 87); Manhattan, New York, U.S.
- Occupation: Actor
- Years active: 1949–2009
- Spouse: Lynda Myles
- Children: 2

Jan Leighton (December 27, 1921 - November 16, 2009) was an American actor and model who appeared in more than 3,000 roles. He specialized in portraying historic characters, but also worked as a voice actor and hand model. He was credited by the Guinness Book of World Records with having played more roles than any other actor.

== Life and career ==
=== Early years ===
Leighton was born in The Bronx, New York as Milton Lichtman in 1921. He would later change his professional name to Jan Leighton in 1949 to de-emphasize his Jewish heritage in order to get more work. His father owned a fleet of taxis, and his mother was a housewife. He attended Aviation High School, but left school at age 17 to work as a mechanic for an aeronautics firm. He joined the U.S. military during World War II, working as a physical training instructor. He briefly attended the University of Mexico in Mexico City after the war, but moved to El Paso, Texas after six months. While living in Texas, he received government funding to attend an acting workshop in New York.

=== Stage and television actor ===
Leighton began his acting career appearing in live television dramas and in theater. He was described as "a large, broad-shouldered man with an amiable face." He won a small role in the Broadway production, Home Is Tomorrow and roles in the television series, Robert Montgomery Presents, Kraft Television Theater, Studio One and Man Against Crime. In 1960, he appeared on Broadway with Lucille Ball in Wildcat.

=== Portrayal of historic characters ===
Leighton later developed a career as an impersonator of historic characters in numerous media—television and print advertisements, industrial and training films, radio, personal appearances and at least one feature film. To prepare for a role, Leighton read biographies on the subject and studied any available reproductions of the subject's appearance and voice.

In 1988, Leighton told The New York Times that "getting" the voice was the key to unlocking the rest of the personality. He said, "By adjusting my face, body and voice, I can be anyone in history. It's my calling." Leighton also created his own costumes. He maintained a prop and wardrobe collection arranged by character and period in his crammed Manhattan apartment; the collection included 121 pairs of shoes, 203 wigs, 197 hats, 71 pairs of glasses, 36 pipes, ten togas, and three inkwells.

He was credited by the Guinness Book of World Records as the actor who had played the most roles. In 1988, Guinness credited him as the man with the most disguises, having played 1,200 famous people in television and print advertisements, and 1,800 more on radio. At a gathering of 32 Guinness record-holders in 1988, Leighton appeared in full costume as General George Patton.

In May 1989, New York magazine published a feature story on Leighton, calling him the "Man of a Thousand Faces." He told the magazine that he avoided costume parties:

"I never go to costume parties. That's a busman's holiday. Heaven for me is to lie in bed stark naked with no costume -- living in my own face and not someone else's -- and luxuriate in my own skin."

By the end of his career, Leighton had reportedly professionally portrayed 3,372 historic notables. In its obituary of Leighton, The New York Times called him the "Actor Who Played Everyone."

An acting publication, SAGWatch, wrote of Leighton: "You'd never know it from his IMDB page, but the Guinness Book of Records says Jan Leighton played more different roles than any other actor in history. ... He was known as an actor who would go anywhere to do any role, in any medium. His website noted 'If you call Jan Leighton at 10 in the morning from New York City, he can show up and play the person before lunch–in full costume!'"

=== Hand model and voice actor ===
In addition to his work portraying historic figures, Leighton also worked as a hand model and voice actor. His hands were transformed into the Ford logo in a long-running advertisement for the automobile company. He was also the trilling voice of the "R-r-r-olling Wr-r-r-iter" pen. He also provided the voice for a talking Spalding golfball, "I'm a Spalding dot ... and this guy can hit me a helluva long way if he wants to."

=== Representative roles ===
Some of the historic and fictional figures Leighton portrayed:

- Leonardo da Vinci and Henry Kissinger on covers of New York magazine
- Uncle Sam on the cover of Time magazine
- William Shakespeare in a skit on Late Night with David Letterman
- Confucius and others on the jacket of Gore Vidal's book Creation
- Fidel Castro, lighting a cigar, in a commercial for Bic lighters
- Alexander Hamilton in a commercial for Cheerios
- Mr. Whipple's twin in a commercial for Charmin toilet paper
- Johann Sebastian Bach in a beer commercial
- Albert Einstein in a commercial for a California Toyota dealership
- Dracula in a commercial for a mobile telephone company
- Frankenstein's monster in a commercial for cough syrup
- John Wayne on the 1981 hit disco single "Get Tough" by Kleeer
- Abraham Lincoln in a commercial for a Minnesota bank
- Robert E. Lee in a commercial for an Arizona department store
- Clark Gable, Groucho Marx, Theodore Roosevelt and Franklin Roosevelt, complaining about check charges, in a series of commercials for a bank
- Albert Einstein in the 1982 motion picture Zapped!

=== Author ===
Leighton and his daughter, Hallie, co-authored the book Rare Words and Ways to Master Their Meanings: 500 Arcane But Useful Words for Language Lovers in 2003, and a 2008 sequel titled Rare Words II and Ways to Master Their Meanings. Charles Osgood called the first book "both rare and well done". The books' publisher also issued a series of flash cards, "Rare Fare," with words and rhymes from Rare Words II.

=== Family and death ===
Leighton was married four times, including actress/Emmy Award-winning writer Lynda Myles, his co-star in The World Turned Upside Down. His first marriage ended with an annulment, and the others ended in divorce. In November 2009, Leighton died due to complications from a stroke at age 87. Leighton was survived by a daughter, Hallie Leighton, and a son, Ross Leighton.
