= Victor Gialanella =

American television soap opera writer (born 1949)

Victor Gialanella (born October 29, 1949) is an American television soap opera writer. Besides his work in daytime, he wrote the Broadway play Frankenstein in 1981, and served as a story editor for Wavelength in 1997. Gialanella, formerly a member of Writers Guild of America, East, left and maintained financial core status during the 2007–08 Writers Guild of America strike.

== Positions held ==
Days of Our Lives (hired by James E. Reilly)

- Breakdown Writer (1997 - June 19, 2006; February 9, 2012 – August 16, 2012)
- Script Editor/Writer (July 1, 2008 - October 10, 2008)
- Co-Head Writer (April 23, 2008 - June 30, 2008)
- Script Writer (October 1994 – June 1997)

General Hospital

- Script Writer (1989 - 1991)

Guiding Light

- Script Writer: 1985 - 1987

One Life to Live

- Associate Head Writer: July 20, 2006 - December 18, 2007

== Awards and nominations ==
Daytime Emmy Award

- Nomination, 1997–1999, Best Writing, Days of our Lives
- Win, 1986, Best Writing, Guiding Light

Writers Guild of America Award

- Nomination, 2001, Best Writing, Days of our Lives
- Win, 1999, Best Writing, Days of our Lives

Preceded by Hogan Sheffer; Meg Kelly	Head Writer of Days of Our Lives; Dena Higley (co-head writer); 2008	Succeeded by Dena Higley; Christopher Whitesell
