= Thomas Wagner (writer) =

American writer, composer, and film producer

Thomas Wagner is an American writer, producer and composer working primarily in documentary films. He is known for his work on Finding Lucy, an American Masters PBS documentary about actress Lucille Ball. Wagner won a prime-time Emmy Award for writing and producing that film. His script for Finding Lucy was also nominated for Best Documentary Script by the Writers Guild of America. Wagner also co-produced another PBS American Masters documentary, Rod Serling: Submitted for your Approval, and his script for that film bio, co-written with John Goff, was again nominated for Best Documentary Script by the Writers Guild of America. The Serling documentary also won a Bronze Plaque at the Columbus Film Festival and a Cine Gold Eagle. Wagner also composed the music for the Academy Award-nominated film, Daughter of The Bride which aired on HBO.

In 2005 Wagner received another Emmy nomination for his musical score for the film, Patrick directed by Pamela Mason Wagner for the Hallmark Channel. Wagner has been composing music for films for over 25 years.

Thomas Wagner and director/producer, Pamela Mason Wagner, started Turtle Rock Productions in 1993 to further their desire to create documentaries and advance the art of nonfiction storytelling.

== Film Scores ==
A partial list Thomas Wagner's film and television composing credits is extensive and dates back to 1986.

- Trailblazers in Habits (2012) (original score)
- Carol Burnett: A Woman of Character (2007) TV episode (composer: series theme)
- Christmas and the Civil War (2006) (Discovery HD Theater)
- John Ford/John Wayne: The Filmmaker and the Legend (2006) (PBS)
- Finding Lucy (2000) (PBS)
- Joan of Arc (2005) (Hallmark)
- Judy Garland: By Myself (2004) (PBS) (composer: series theme)
- Patrick (2004) (Hallmark)
- None Without Sin (2003) (PBS) (composer: theme music)
- Reluctant Saint: Francis of Assisi (2003) (Hallmark)
- Clint Eastwood: Out of the Shadows (2000) (PBS) (composer: series theme)
- Sidney Poitier: One Bright Light (2000) (PBS) (composer: series theme)
- Isaac Stern: Life's Virtuoso (2000) (PBS) (composer: theme music)
- "100 Years of Terror" (2000) TV series
- Leonard Bernstein, Reaching for the Note (1998) (PBS) (composer: series theme)
- Norville and Trudy (1997) (Walkabout Productions)
- Family Video Diaries: Daughter of the Bride (1997) (HBO)
- Hasten Slowly: The Journey of Sir Laurens van der Post (1997) (PBS)
- "The Wisdom of Faith with Huston Smith: A Bill Moyers Special" (1996) TV mini-series (PBS)
- "American Cinema" (1995) (PBS TV series) (The Star, The Hollywood Style, Film Noir, The Western, Film in the Television Age, The Edge of Hollywood)
- What Kids Want to Know About Sex and Growing Up (1992) (Children's Television Workshop)
- Eyes of War (1989) (Vestron)
- USSR Art (1988) (PBS)
- Japan Reaches for the 21st Century (1986) (PBS)

== Writing and Producing credits ==
Wagner has been writing and producing television since 1994; his most recent work is for PBS through their Nova Science Now series.

- Nova Science Now: Can We Make It to Mars (2011) (PBS) (co-producer)
- Finding Lucy (2000) (PBS) (writer & producer)
- Rod Serling: Submitted for Your Approval (1995) (PBS) (co-writer & co-producer)
