= Meg Kelly =

American television soap opera screenwriter

Marguerite "Meg" Kelly Rizzoli is an American television soap opera screenwriter who has received three Daytime Emmy Awards.

== Biography ==
Kelly was born as one of four children to journalists Thomas and Marguerite Kelly. Her brother was Michael Kelly, a magazine editor and journalist who was killed in 2003 while covering the Iraq War, and one of her sisters is Katie Kelly, a journalist and children's book writer. A former actress, she joined Arena Stage at the age of about twelve or thirteen, touring Russia with them. In 1978 she began studying at the Catholic University of America before dropping out to attend the Circle in the Square Theatre School in New York City from 1980 to 1982. In New York she landed a Broadway role from 1988 to 1989 in a run of the play The Devil's Disciple. She moved to Los Angeles with her husband, actor Tony Rizzoli. She began writing screenplays and was a finalist for the Nicholl Fellowship, turning to screenwriting for daytime TV shows because she could easily integrate that job with raising her children. Kelly, formerly a member of Writers Guild of America West, left and maintained financial core status during the 2007–08 Writers Guild of America strike.

== Positions held ==
As the World Turns

- Script Writer: 2000 - April 6, 2005

Days of Our Lives

- Co-Head Writer (with Hogan Sheffer): October 5, 2006 - January 24, 2008
- Script Writer: September 6, 2006 - January 24, 2008

One Life to Live

- Breakdown Writer: July 12, 2005 - Nov 21, 2006

== Awards and nominations ==
Daytime Emmy Award

- Win, 2002, 2004 and 2005, Best Writing, As the World Turns
- Nomination, 2003, Best Writing, As the World Turns

| Preceded by James E. Reilly (2003 - May 2006) (Beth Milstein: Interim Head Writer) | Co-Head Writer of Days of Our Lives (Hogan Sheffer as Head Writer); October 5, 2006 - January 24, 2008 | Succeeded by Dena Higley, Victor Gialanella |
