= David Goldschmid =

American television writer and producer

David Goldschmid (sometimes credited as Dave Goldschmid) is an American television writer and producer, currently writing for the daytime drama General Hospital.

== Personal life ==
He was raised in Los Angeles, California, where he currently resides.

== Positions held ==
At ABC's General Hospital

- Staff Writer: October 17, 2005 – present
- Occasional Breakdown Writer: April 28, 2005 - October 16, 2005

== Awards and nominations ==
Daytime Emmy Award

- Won: 2009
- Nominated: 2007, 2008

Writers Guild of America Award

- Won: 2012
- Nominated: 2007, 2011
