= Royal Miller =

- Born: June 30, 1966 (age 59); Hamilton AFB (Novato, CA)
- Education: Brown University (BA); New York University (MFA)

Royal E. Miller is an Emmy winning American television soap opera script writer. He earned a B.A. in Literature & Society and Semiotics (honors) from Brown University, an M.F.A. in film direction and screenwriting from New York University, Tisch School of the Arts. He has also been the recipient of an ABC/Disney Daytime Writing Fellowship and served an appointment as a lecturer for two years in the undergraduate college at Harvard University.

== Positions held ==
All My Children

- Script writer: 2000 - 2001

As the World Turns

- Script writer: 2001 - 2002

The City

- Script writer: 1996 - 1997

Guiding Light

- Script writer: 2003 - 2007

Port Charles

- Script writer: 1997 - 1999

== Awards and nominations ==
Daytime Emmy Award

- Win, 2007, Best Writing, Guiding Light
- Nomination, 2005, Best Writing, Guiding Light
- Nomination, 2003, Best Writing, As the World Turns
- Win, 2002, Best Writing, As the World Turns
- Nomination, 2001 & 2002, Best Writing, All My Children

Writers Guild of America Award

- Nomination, 2006, Best Writing, Guiding Light
- Win, 2005, Best Writing, Guiding Light
- Win, 2001 & 2002, Best Writing, All My Children
