= Karen Lewis (screenwriter) =

American television soap opera writer (born 1950)

Karen Lewis (born 1950s) is an American television soap opera writer.

== Positions held ==
All My Children

- Screenwriter: 1985 - 1997, October 2001 - October 17, 2007
- Script editor: 1997 - 1999

As the World Turns

- Script editor: 1999 - 2000

== Awards and nominations ==
Daytime Emmy Award

- Nominations; 1988, 1990–1993, 1995–1999, 2003 and 2004; Best Writing; All My Children
- Wins; 1988, and 1996–1999; Best Writing; All My Children
- Nominations; 2000 and 2001; Best Writing; As The World Turns
- Win; 2001; Best Writing; As the World Turns

Writers Guild of America Award

- Nominations; 1989–1991, 1993, and 1995–1999 seasons; All My Children
- Wins; 1996, 1998 and 2003 seasons; All My Children
