= Maura Penders =

American television soap opera writer

- Occupation: Television soap opera writer

Maura Penders is an American television soap opera writer.

== Positions held ==
Another World

- Associate Head Writer (1998– June 25, 1999)
- Script Writer (1998)

Days of Our Lives (hired by Anne Howard Bailey, then by Tom Langan)

- Associate Head Writer (1989–1997, 2000–2002)
- Occasional Script Writer (1989–1997, 2000–2002)

Guiding Light

- Associate Writer (2000)

Port Charles

- Associate Head Writer (1997)

Ryan's Hope

- Script Writer (1984–1986)

== Awards and nominations ==
Daytime Emmy Award

- Nomination, 1994 and 1997, Best Writing, Days of our Lives

Writers Guild of America Award

- Nomination, 1991 and 1993, Best Writing, Days of our Lives
- Nomination, 1986, Best Writing, Ryan's Hope
