= Lynda Myles (American writer) =

American dramatist (1939–2023)

- Born: July 22, 1939; New York City, New York, U.S.
- Died: April 15, 2023 (aged 83); New York City, New York, U.S.
- Occupations: Writer; Actress
- Years active: 1972–2023

Lynda Myles (July 22, 1939 – April 15, 2023) was an American television writer, actress, playwright, memoirist, and short fiction writer. She attended Michigan State University and was known for her Broadway plays such as Two Gentlemen of Verona, Iphigenia in Aulis, No Exit, Rocking Chair, Trojan Women and Neil Simon's Plaza Suite.

== Career ==
=== Actress ===
Myles made her Broadway debut in Neil Simon's Plaza Suite with Maureen Stapleton and George C. Scott.

As an actress, Ms. Myles was featured as George Washington's friend Sally Fairfax in the David L. Wolper's TV drama The World Turned Upside Down opposite her first husband Jan Leighton.

=== Writer ===
Her first play Wives was selected for the Eugene O'Neill National Playwright's Conference at the Eugene O'Neill Theater Center in 1979 and was performed at Theatre Row.

Her short story A Lucky Man was featured in the inaugural issue of The Creative Writer, the book series from J.D. Vine Publications. As a playwright, her play Thirteen has been performed in New York and at the ACT Theatre in Seattle.

Myles wrote for General Hospital, Santa Barbara, Guiding Light, As the World Turns, Loving, and One Life to Live.

Myles was an editor and contributor to TheMemoirGroup.com.

== Personal life and death ==
Myles was married to actor Jan Leighton. They had a daughter, Hallie Leighton.

Myles died in New York City on April 15, 2023, at the age of 83.

== Awards and nominations ==
- Two Daytime Emmy Awards, Santa Barbara
- Six Daytime Emmy Award Nominations, Santa Barbara
- Writers Guild of America Award for Scriptwriting
- 2007: John Gardner Memorial Prize for Fiction for short story The Blue Dress
