= Hogan Sheffer =

American screenwriter (1958–2019)

Hogan Sheffer (June 12, 1958 – September 28, 2019) was an American screenwriter.

== Personal life ==
Sheffer was born in York, Pennsylvania. His full birth name was Mark Wayne Sheffer; his nickname of Hogan came from younger brother Craig, who thought he looked like pianist/composer Hoagy Carmichael.

== Film career ==
From 1986 to 1994, he worked as a freelancer and did script analysis for various production companies. He also worked for Mary Stuart Masterson at her production company. From 1997 to 2000, he was employed by DreamWorks as the Director of Screenplay Development under producers Mark Johnson and Elizabeth Cantillon. He was in charge of developing screenplays for films like My Dog Skip, Galaxy Quest, Home Fries, and What Lies Beneath.

== As the World Turns ==
Sheffer is perhaps best known for his time as head writer of the CBS Daytime drama As the World Turns from 2000 to 2005.

When Procter & Gamble, the company that produces As the World Turns, hired Sheffer, it came as a surprise to both industry figures and viewers. Some fans became concerned when, in an interview, he admitted he had never seen As the World Turns or sister soap Guiding Light before he was asked to watch them. P&G gave Sheffer a choice of which show he'd like to write for, and although he commented that ATWT had been "boring as hell", he saw potential in the show.

=== Praise ===
Sheffer's take on As the World Turns, an aging show in one of the oldest genres in television, was perceived by some as reinvigorating the program. During Sheffer's writing regime, the show won many Daytime Emmy Awards; Sheffer and his team received four Emmys for Outstanding Drama Series Writing Team in 2001, 2002, 2004, and 2005. ATWT's loss in 2003 was blamed on technical difficulties with their Emmy reel, as the clips judges watched had either bad or no sound and were tinted green. Also, Sheffer became a favorite of reporters for his comical one-liners.

=== Criticism ===
Sheffer's writing style alienated a number of longtime fans of ATWT, who complained that he rewrote characters to suit the purposes of a given storyline. In particular, he and his team were criticized for departing from history and/or established character motivation and behavior. While some storylines for veteran characters worked well (turning Barbara Ryan into a villainess), others seemed inappropriate for the character, like Margo's flirtation with misogynistic football player Doc.

Throughout its run, As the World Turns had perhaps the largest group of veterans still active in the cast; during the Sheffer's tenure, a dozen actors were on contract to the show (or were recurring in their roles) who had been with the show for 20 or more years. Some of the veteran actors on the show (most vocally Eileen Fulton who played longtime heroine Lisa Grimaldi) also complained that their characters' airtime diminished dramatically during Sheffer's tenure.

=== Departure from ATWT ===
In March 2005, Sheffer took what was referred to a "17-week sabbatical" from ATWT, at which time other writers like Leah Laiman, Christopher Whitesell, and Jean Passanante took over. P&G initially indicated that he would return at the end of his sabbatical, but announced a few weeks later that Sheffer would not be returning to his position as Head Writer; the company promoted Jean Passanante to the position permanently, a position she held until the show ended in 2010.

Reasons for his leave and subsequent firing were unclear. There were suggestions that Sheffer was ill; there were also suggestions that he had taken a leave to undergo gastric bypass surgery. However, no statements confirming the reason for his leave were made. Before being placed on a 17-week sabbatical, Sheffer was unhappy at ATWT, as a planned two-year storyline was cut short by higher-ups.

When he won his fourth Daytime Emmy for ATWT in 2005, he did not attend the ceremony. Jean Passanante accepted the award. Passanante thanked Sheffer for "his big heart and brilliant imagination" and said the entire writing staff at the show would "miss him".

In 2002, when Richard Culliton was fired from the ABC Daytime soap opera All My Children, it was speculated that Sheffer would leave ATWT to take over that soap. After Sheffer was fired in 2005, speculation again circulated that Sheffer would head to One Life to Live to join Dena Higley as head writer, or to help out the low-rated Guiding Light as an Executive Consultant.

ATWT fans were shocked when in the summer of 2005, Sheffer was asked to return as head writer. He declined, but agreed to take a lesser position on the writing staff, much like Leah Laiman did in early 2005 when she returned to writing for the show. In October 2005, Sheffer returned to ATWT as a breakdown writer.

== Other shows ==
=== Days of Our Lives ===
On June 12, 2006, Sheffer confirmed he was joining Days of Our Lives as the new Head Writer with Meg Kelly Sheffer's stories began airing in October 2006. Sheffer's last episode aired January 24, 2008.

Sheffer appeared with DAYS star Mary Beth Evans on the SOAPnet show I Wanna Be a Soap Star in 2007.

=== The Young and the Restless ===
On May 21, 2008, it was announced that Sheffer had joined The Young and the Restless as co-Head writer. He worked closely with Maria Arena Bell and Scott Hamner. His episodes began airing July 15, 2008 Formerly a member of Writers Guild of America West, left and maintained financial core status during the 2007–08 Writers Guild of America strike.

In late July 2012 due to the firings of Maria Arena Bell and Scott Hamner, it was announced that Sheffer's contract was up as of that November, and it wouldn't be extended. He remained credited as co-head writer on air shows until February 1, 2013.

== Positions held ==
As the World Turns

- Associate Head Writer: 2005 – 2006
- Head Writer: 2000 – 2005

Days of Our Lives

- Head Writer: 2006 – 2008

The Young and the Restless

- Co-Head Writer: 2008 – 2013

== Awards and nominations ==
=== Daytime Emmy Awards ===
==== Wins ====
- (2001, 2002, 2004 & 2005; Best Writing; As the World Turns)
- (2011; The Young and the Restless)

==== Nominations ====
- (2003 & 2006; Best Writing; As the World Turns)
- (2010 & 2012; Best Writing; The Young and the Restless)

=== Writers Guild of America Award ===
==== Wins ====
- (2007 season; As the World Turns)

==== Nominations ====
- (2006 season; As the World Turns)

== HW history ==
Preceded by Leah Laiman; Carolyn Culliton	Head writer of As the World Turns (with Carolyn Culliton: June 13, 2000 – September 20, 2002) (with Hal Corley: June 13, 2000 – July 13, 2001) (with Stephen Demorest: June 13, 2000 – July 13, 2001) (with Jean Passanante: July 16, 2001 – May 24, 2005); June 13, 2000 – May 24, 2005	Succeeded by Jean Passanante; Leah Laiman; Christopher Whitesell
Preceded by Beth Milstein	Head writer of Days of Our Lives (with Meg Kelly); October 5, 2006 – January 24, 2008	Succeeded by WGA Strike
Preceded by Maria Arena Bell	Co-head writer of The Young and the Restless (with Maria Arena Bell: 7/15/08-10/22/12) (with Scott Hamner: 8/11/08-11/2/12) (with Josh Griffith: 10/11/12-2/1/13) (with Tracey Thomson: 12/7/12-2/1/13); July 15, 2008 – February 1, 2013	Succeeded by Josh Griffith; Tracey Thomson
