= Christina Covino =

American television soap opera writer

Christina Covino is an American television soap opera writer.

== Positions held ==
All My Children

- Script Writer (2002-2003)
- Breakdown Writer (1996 - 1997) (Hired by Lorraine Broderick)

As the World Turns

- Script Writer (1995, 1999)
- Breakdown Writer (1995-1996; 1998-1999)

== Awards and nominations ==
Daytime Emmy Award

- Nomination, 2004, Best Writing, All My Children
- Nomination, 2003, Best Writing, All My Children
- Nomination, 2000, Best Writing, As the World Turns
- Win, 1998, Best Writing, All My Children
- Win, 1997, Best Writing, All My Children

Writers Guild of America Award

- Win, 2003, Best Writing, All My Children
- Nomination, 1998, Best Writing, As the World Turns
- Nomination, 1997, Best Writing, All My Children
- Win, 1996, Best Writing, All My Children
