= Mary Sue Price =

American screenwriter

Mary Sue Price is an American playwright and scriptwriter for the ABC Daytime soap opera General Hospital. She has won two Emmys as a member of the General Hospital writing team.

== Education ==
Price holds an undergraduate degree from New York University and an MFA in Dramatic Writing from NYU.

== Positions held ==
Another World

- Scriptwriter: 1997 - 1999

As the World Turns

- Scriptwriter: 1997

General Hospital (hired by Robert Guza Jr.)

- Screenwriter: 1999 - December 24, 2007; March 14, 2008 - September 9, 2012)

== Plays ==
- Back In Jesus Days
- That Midnight Rodeo
- Streets of Gold

Running Quarter Horses

== Awards and nominations ==
Price has been nominated for six Daytime Emmy Awards (won twice) and 2 Writers Guild of America Awards.

== See also ==
- History of General Hospital
- List of General Hospital characters
