= Teresa Zimmerman =

American television soap opera writer

Teresa Zimmerman is an American television soap opera writer.

== Positions held ==
The Bold and the Beautiful (hired by William J. Bell)

- Production Personnel (July 14, 1991 – December 14, 1994)
- Script Writer (December 26, 1994 –October 13, 2003)
- Associate Head Writer (May 31, 2004–May 27, 2005)

The Young and the Restless (hired by Maria Arena Bell)

- Script Writer (March 2, 2009–January 29, 2013)
- Breakdown Writer (August 31, 2018–September 5, 2022)

Beyond the Gates

- Breakdown Writer (March 5, 2025–present)

== Awards and nominations ==
Daytime Emmy Award

- Nomination, 2003, Best Writing, The Bold and the Beautiful
- Nomination, 2000, Best Writing, The Bold and the Beautiful
