= Stephanie Braxton =

American actress

- Occupations: Television writer, actress, playwright

Stephanie Braxton is an American television writer and actress.

== Acting credits ==
- Love Is a Many Splendored Thing (Blind student)
- The Secret Storm (Laurie Hollister Stevens Reddin #2)
- All My Children (Tara Martin #2)
- The Edge of Night (Winter Austen #2)
- Quincy M.E. (Donna)
- Eight is Enough (Doris)
- Dallas (Alisha Ogden)
- King's Crossing (Carol Hadary)
- Hill Street Blues (Fowler)
- The Jeffersons (Leontyne Farrell)
- The Lilac Papers (Jean)
- Caught in the Act (Herself)

== Writing credits ==
- One Life to Live
- Guiding Light
- Search for Tomorrow (co-head writer with Paul Avila Mayer)
- General Hospital (hired by Claire Labine)
- As the World Turns (Hired by Douglas Marland)
