= Hal Corley =

American television writer

- Education: Bradley University (1973 B.A. English)
- Occupations: Television writer, playwright
- Notable work: Finding Donis Anne
- Awards: Five Emmy awards Two Writers Guild awards Playwriting awards

Hal Corley is an American television writer and playwright. He was associate head writer for All My Children and As The World Turns, for which he won five Daytime Emmy Awards and two Writers Guild of America Awards. His plays have been developed with the Seattle Repertory Theatre, Syracuse Stage, Walnut Street Theatre, Premiere Stages, Atlanta's Alliance Theatre, New York's Westbeth, San Francisco's New Conservatory Theatre Center, Adirondack Theatre Festival, Washington DC's Source, Stageworks/Hudson, Los Angeles' New American Theatre, and Ontario's Flush Ink. Three full-length scripts, Easter Monday, Mama and Jack Carew, and ODD, are published by Samuel French/Concord Theatricals. His Fanny Otcott, an adaptation of a sketch by Thornton Wilder, is published by YouthPLAYS; his Treed is in Playscripts' Great Short Plays Volume 10; and his Dolor is included in Applause's Best American Short Plays for 2014-2015. His work is excerpted in Smith & Krause's Best Stage Scenes of 2008 and Best Men's/Women's Stage Scenes and Monologues of 2011, 222 More Comedy Monologues (2017), and in Samuel French's Exceptional Monologues 2. He is a member of the Dramatists Guild and the Writers Guild of America, East.

== Awards and nominations ==
=== Television ===
Year	Award	Category	Show	Result	Notes
1992	Daytime Emmy Awards	Best writing	All My Children	Nominated	
1992	Writers Guild of America Award	Best writing	All My Children	Nominated	
1993	Daytime Emmy Awards	Best writing	All My Children	Nominated	
1994	Writers Guild of America Award	Best writing	All My Children	Nominated	
1995	Daytime Emmy Awards	Best writing	All My Children	Nominated	
1996	Daytime Emmy Awards	Best writing	All My Children	Won	
1996	Writers Guild of America Award	Best writing	All My Children	Nominated	
1997	Daytime Emmy Awards	Best writing	All My Children	Won	
1997	Writers Guild of America Award	Best writing	All My Children	Won	
1998	Daytime Emmy Awards	Best writing	All My Children	Won	
1998	Daytime Emmy Awards	Best writing	All My Children	Nominated	
1999	Writers Guild of America Award	Best writing	All My Children	Won	
1999	Writers Guild of America Award	Best writing	As the World Turns	Nominated	
2000	Daytime Emmy Awards	Best writing	As the World Turns	Nominated	
2001	Daytime Emmy Awards	Best writing	As the World Turns	Won	
2002	Daytime Emmy Awards	Best writing	As the World Turns	Won	

=== Playwriting awards ===
Year	Play	Venue	Award	Notes
2007	ODD	2007 Premiere Stages Play Festival	Winner	
2011	The Imaginary Orange	FirstStage LA	First Prize Winner	
2011	Treed	Belhaven University	One-Act Contest Winner	
2018	Married North	The Arch and Bruce Brown Foundation; HRC Showcase Award	Honorable Mention	
