= Janice Ferri Esser =

American writer

Janice Ferri Esser (sometimes credited only as Janice Ferri) is an American writer known for her work on the daytime television serials The Young and the Restless and The Bold and the Beautiful.

== Positions held ==
The Young and the Restless

- Script Writer: July 20, 1989 – May 4, 2007; August 27, 2008 – March 20, 2024
- Script Editor: 2004 - 2007; 2008-2017 (as backup)

The Bold and the Beautiful

- Story Consultant: June 4, 2007 - April 16, 2008
- Script Writer: June 5, 2007 - October 21, 2008

== Awards and nominations ==
Daytime Emmy Awards

- Nominations (1991–1995, 1997–2001, 2003–2006, 2009-2024 – Outstanding Drama Series Writing Team, The Young and the Restless; and 2007–2008 – Outstanding Drama Series Writing Team, The Bold & the Beautiful)
- Wins (1992, 1997, 2000, 2006, 2011, 2014, 2017, 2019, 2021 & 2023 – Outstanding Drama Series Writing Team, The Young and the Restless)

Writers Guild of America Award

- Nominations (1999, 2001–2002, 2005–2006, 2008–2009, 2010–2011, 2012–2013, 2013–2014, 2021–2022 seasons; The Young and the Restless)
- Wins (2002, 2005, 2008, 2010, 2013, 2020; The Young and the Restless)
