= Courtney Simon =

American writer and actress (born 1946)

- Born: June 23, 1946 (age 80)
- Other names: Courtney Sherman, Courtney Sherman Simon, Kate Brooks
- Occupations: Writer, actress
- Known for: Search for Tomorrow
- Spouse: Peter Simon (m. 1975)

Courtney Simon (born June 23, 1946) is an American writer and actress. Simon is sometimes credited as Kate Brooks or Courtney Sherman or Courtney Sherman Simon. Simon is best known for having created the role of Kathy Phillips on the long-running soap opera Search for Tomorrow.

== Career ==
=== Acting roles ===
Simon is best known for having created the role of Kathy Phillips on the long-running soap opera Search for Tomorrow.

She has also played roles on Guiding Light (Dinah Buckley), All My Children, and Another World. Her more recent acting work has been on a recurring basis. As a featured actress, she is best known for playing Dr. Lynn Michaels on As the World Turns.

=== Writing work ===
Simon began to contribute to shows as a writer while she was still a cast member at Search for Tomorrow. She has worked steadily as a breakdown script writer ever since. With recurring, part-time acting roles, she has occasionally worked at a show as a writer and as an actor; she has also worked on one show as a writer while appearing on another program as an actor.

Simon wrote at The Doctors under the pseudonym Kate Brooks.

=== Positions held ===
All My Children (hired by Lorraine Broderick)

- Script Writer: 1996 - 1997

Another World

- Script Writer: 1998 - June 25, 1999

As the World Turns (hired by Susan Bedsow Horgan)

- Script Writer: 1984 - 1985, 2000 - 2001
- Script Editor: 2001 - January 24, 2008, April 18, 2008 - September 2010

General Hospital

- Script Writer: 1997 - 1998

Guiding Light (hired by Nancy Curlee)

- Writer: 1992 - 1993

Loving

- Writer: 1991

Santa Barbara

- Script Writer: 1986 - 1991

Search for Tomorrow

- Script Writer: 1982 - 1984

=== Awards and nominations ===
Daytime Emmy Awards

WINS

- (1989; Best Writing; Santa Barbara)
- (1993; Best Writing; Guiding Light)
- (1997; Best Writing; All My Children)
- (2001, 2002, 2004 & 2005; Best Writing; As the World Turns)

NOMINATIONS

- (1986; Best Writing; As the World Turns)
- (1988 & 1990; Best Writing; Santa Barbara)
- (1998; Best Writing; General Hospital)
- (2003, 2006 & 2010; Best Writing; As the World Turns)

Writers Guild of America Award

WINS

- (1985 season; Search for Tomorrow)
- (1991 & 1992 seasons; Santa Barbara)
- (1997 season; All My Children)
- (1998 season; General Hospital)
- (2007 & 2009 seasons; As the World Turns)

NOMINATIONS

- (1995 & 1996 seasons; Guiding Light)
- (1998 season; All My Children)
- (1999 season; General Hospital)
- (2008 & 2010 seasons; As the World Turns)
- (2011 & 2013 seasons; One Life to Live)

== Personal life ==
Simon's first marriage, to Ed Easton, ended in divorce. She met actor Peter Simon while they were both part of the cast on Search for Tomorrow. The couple married in 1975 and have raised five children (some from previous marriages, as well as one born to the couple, Kate Hall, who is also a daytime soap writer).
