= Jeff Beldner =

American soap opera writer

Jeff Beldner is an American soap opera writer.

== Positions held ==
All My Children (hired by Agnes Nixon)

- Script Editor: 2004 - 2011
- Associate Head Writer: 1994 - 1997, 2001 - 2004
- Script Writer: 1991 - 1994
- Writer's Assistant: 1990 - 1992

As the World Turns (hired by Lorraine Broderick)

- Breakdown Writer (1998 - 2001)

The Young and the Restless (hired by Maria Arena Bell)

- Breakdown Writer: 2012 – Present

== Awards and nominations ==
- Daytime Emmy NOMINATIONS (1992 & 1993, 1995, 2002–2004; Best Writing; All My Children)
- Daytime Emmy WINS (2001 & 2002; Best Writing; As the World Turns)
- Daytime Emmy NOMINATION (2000; Best Writing; As the World Turns)
- Daytime Emmy WINS (1996–1998; Best Writing; All My Children)
- Writers Guild of America Award WINS (For 1996, 1997 & 2003 Season; All My Children)
- Writers Guild of America Award NOMINATION (For 1998 Season; As the World Turns)
- Writers Guild of America Award NOMINATION (For 1995 Season; All My Children)
