= Whitesell =

Whitesell is a surname. Notable people with the surname include:

- Brian Whitesell (born 1964), American auto racing team manager
- Christopher Whitesell, American television soap opera writer
- Jim Whitesell (born 1959), American college basketball coach
- John Whitesell (born 1961), American television and film director
- Jonathan Whitesell (born 1991), Canadian actor
- Josh Whitesell (born 1982), American major league baseball player
- Kenneth R. Whitesell (born 1961), American Navy admiral
- Patrick Whitesell (born 1965), American talent agent and co-CEO of WME Entertainment
- Pia Whitesell (born 1983), Australian model, actress and television presenter
- Sean Whitesell (1963–2015), American film and television actor
