= The Mailroom: Hollywood History from the Bottom Up =

2003 book by David Rensin

The Mailroom: Hollywood History From the Bottom Up
- Author: David Rensin
- Language: English
- Subject: Entertainment, Hollywood, interviews, tell-all
- Publisher: Ballantine Books (U.S.)
- Publication date: 4 February 2003 (U.S.)
- Publication place: United States
- Media type: Print (Hardback & Paperback) also AudioBook
- Pages: 464 pp (US hardback edition)
- ISBN: 0-345-44234-2 (US hardback edition)
- OCLC: 51565606
- Dewey Decimal: 791.43/09794/93 21
- LC Class: PN1993.5.U65 R45 2003
- Preceded by: Where Did I Go Right?: You're No One in Hollywood Unless Someone Wants You Dead

The Mailroom: Hollywood History from the Bottom Up is a 2003 book by David Rensin that recounts what it is like to work in the mailroom in Hollywood’s most prestigious talent agencies. Rensin interviewed over 200 mailroom graduates from agencies like William Morris Agency and Creative Artists Agency. Mailroom employees often aspire to become agents themselves.

Rensin was already a successful ghostwriter for celebrities, including Tim Allen and Chris Rock. Ballantine Books bought The Mailroom for six figures in 2000 and the original title was reportedly The Mailroom: Big Dreams and Raw Ambition in Hollywood's Power Boot Camp.

At the time of publication, graduates of Harvard Business School were known to turn down high-paying corporate jobs to instead work for less than $400 a week at major agencies. During an interview with USA Today, Rensin was asked how competitive it was to obtain jobs in mailrooms, to which he replied, "They say it's tougher to get into the mailroom at a place like William Morris than to get into the Harvard Law School, Columbia University Graduate School of Journalism, or Stanford Business School. A New York Times story placed the ratio at 30-1, and EW said 10-1, so it's somewhere in there."

== List of notable interviewees ==
- Bernie Brillstein is the founding partner of Brillstein-Grey Entertainment, a preeminent management and production company.
- Norman Brokaw is the current chairman of the William Morris Agency. He started as the first West Coast trainee in 1943. He has made the business both his career and life. He has represented clients such as Marilyn Monroe, Kim Novak, Clint Eastwood, and, for over 35 years, Bill Cosby.
- Rob Carlson is a senior vice president and head of the Motion Picture Literary and Directors Department at the William Morris Agency.
- Barry Diller is currently chairman and CEO of the Universal entertainment group, with responsibility for Universal Studios, the film and TV operations, and theme parks. He is also chairman and senior executive of InterActiveCorp. Diller has headed Paramount and Fox, invented TV’s “movie of the week.”
- Hilly Elkins, film and stage producer and talent manager.
- Brian Medavoy, co-founder of More/Medavoy Management. His former and current clients include Jimmy Fallon, Jason Bateman, Kristen Bell, Ryan Reynolds, and Bella Heathcote.
- David Geffen is one of the entertainment industry’s most prolific leaders. As an agent, manager, record mogul, art connoisseur, political contributor, film producer, and most notably the “G” in DreamWorks SKG.
- Sam Haskell is the executive vice president, worldwide head of television, for the William Morris Agency. He’s been with the company for over twenty five years.
- Judy Hofflund formed InterTalent Agency, part of which later merged with United Talent Agency, where she ran the Talent Department. She is now one of the two owners of ‘’’Hofflund/Polone’’’, a management and production company representing clients such as Kevin Kline, Kenneth Branagh, Sally Field, Julia Louis-Dreyfus, and Alan Rickman.
- Kevin Huvane is a managing director of Creative Artists Agency.
- Ronald Meyer is one of the agents who left William Morris Agency to form Creative Artists Agency. After leaving CAA, Meyer joined Universal and is currently chairman of Universal Pictures.
- Rowland Perkins co-founded the Creative Artists Agency with four others who left William Morris Agency in 1975. After leaving CAA in 1995 he became an independent producer of feature, TV, network, and cable films. Currently Mr. Perkins is chairman and also sits on the board of ieProducer.com, an integrated Internet company, and is president of ieProducer.com’s wholly owned subsidiary ‘’’Talentclick’’’, an Internet company servicing the casting needs of the motion picture, television, legitimate theater, and commercial worlds.
- Jack Rapke is a partner in ImageMovers, a film and TV production company affiliated with DreamWorks SKG. His productions include Cast Away and What Lies Beneath.
- Stan Rosenfield is the owner and president of Stan Rosenfield and Associates, the entertainment industry’s leading public relations company.
- Tom Strickler is a founding partner at The Endeavor Agency.
- Jeremy Zimmer is a partner and board member at United Talent Agency.

== Reception ==
Kirkus Reviews praised the book for containing "edgy, frenetic, and entertaining reports from the room that launched a thousand deals."

Publishers Weekly wrote "Rensin...captures the ambition, manipulative plotting and hustler mentality of a few Hollywood mailroom employees in this series of raunchy, realistic interviews."

David Freeman of the Los Angeles Times "[grew] weary of prideful tales of half-baked banditry" and noted that "Agents live by a code: Never say no to the talent. Consequently, they tend to be very demanding of their own servants."

In 2003, Variety reported that HBO and Brad Grey planned to make a documentary based on The Mailroom. Grey also considered creating a scripted series.
