= Mailroom =

Place where mail of an organization or building is sorted

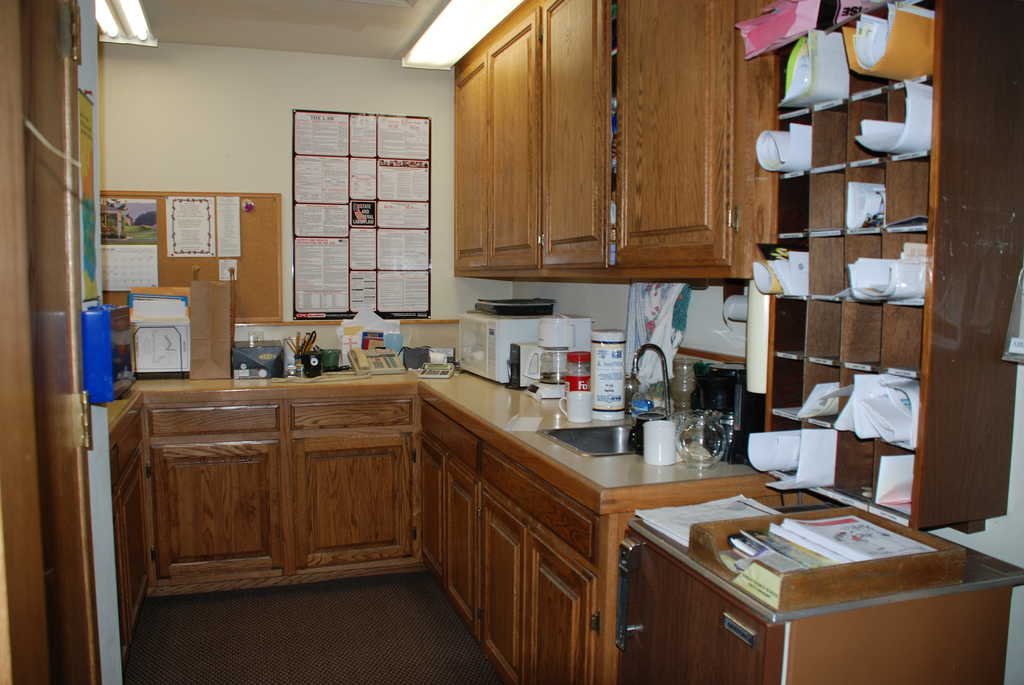
Office mailroom and kitchenette, Holy Trinity Lutheran Church, March 2007, Thousand Oaks, CA

A mailroom (US) or post room (UK) is a room in which internal, incoming, and outgoing mail is processed and sorted. Mailrooms are commonly found in schools, offices, apartment buildings, and the generic post office. A person who works in a mailroom is known as a mailroom clerk or mailboy and the head person (sometimes the only person) is called the postmaster. The mailroom is responsible for a company's incoming and outgoing mail. A mailroom clerk prepares outgoing mail and packages prior to their being sent out via the post office or other carrier.

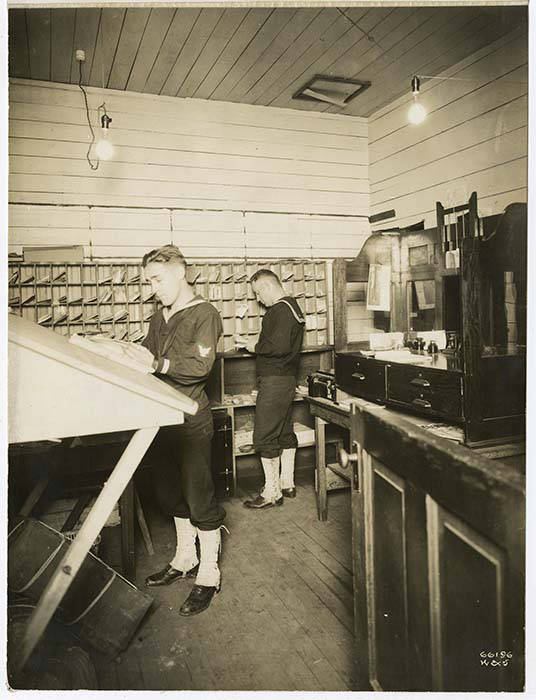
Mailroom at Naval Training Station - Seattle, Washington (United States), circa 1918

In a large organization, the mailroom is the central hub of the internal mail system and the interface with external mail. The postmaster manages the department, clerks assist them and mailboys deliver mail for other employees in different departments using a mail cart or a trolley doing regular rounds throughout the day. Sometimes the mailboys will trolley sort using the departmental slots on the trolley to reduce work at the central hub and to speed internal mail.

Working in the mailroom as a mail clerk or in dated parlance, mailboy, was a stereotypical male gender oriented entry-level job in an organization, and working one's way up the corporate ladder "from the mailroom" is a common idiom. At a few companies the mailroom is the basis or metonym for a training program for highly promising early-career hires. U.S. talent agency mailrooms, starting with the William Morris Agency mailroom, became famous for alumni rising to the highest levels in the entertainment industry, documented in the book The Mailroom: Hollywood History from the Bottom Up.

== See also ==
- Digital mailroom
- Internal mail
