= Message box =

Message box may refer to:

- Pigeon-hole messagebox, a method for communicating in organizations
- Dialog box, a kind of window in graphical user interfaces
