= Johnny Hyde =

Hollywood talent agent (1895–1950)

- Born: Ivan Haidabura; 23 April 1895; Poltava, Ukraine, Russian Empire
- Died: 18 December 1950 (aged 55); Los Angeles County, California, United States
- Spouses: Florence Harper; Mozelle Cravens
- Children: 4 sons
- Relatives: Norman Brokaw (nephew)

Johnny Hyde (born Ivan Haidabura; 23 April 1895 – 18 December 1950) was an American talent agent who developed the career of Marilyn Monroe.

== Early life ==
Hyde was born to a Ukrainian Jewish family and moved to the United States in April 1898. His father, Nicholas, was an actor.

== Career ==
Hyde was the vice-president of the William Morris Agency's West Coast office during the 1930s and 1940s and represented some of the biggest names in the entertainment industry. In 1949 he met then-unknown actress and model Marilyn Monroe when she was being photographed by Hollywood pin-up photographer Bruno Bernard at the Racquet Club of Palm Springs. Taking her on as a client, he arranged for Monroe to undergo multiple cosmetic surgeries, including a full rhinoplasty and the insertion of a cartilage chin implant. and used his influence to help her land the roles of Angela in The Asphalt Jungle and Miss Caswell in All About Eve. The buzz generated by her performances enabled Hyde to negotiate a contract for Monroe with 20th Century Fox. Just a few days after securing the contract, Hyde died of a heart attack aged 55.

Hyde eventually left his wife for Monroe. He wanted to marry her, but she repeatedly refused his marriage proposals; she said she loved Hyde, but was not actually in love with him. Monroe was his mistress when he died.

== Death and legacy ==
Hyde died on 18 December 1950.

He was survived by his third wife, actress Mozelle Cravens (1914–2004), and his four sons, two from his first marriage to Florence Harper and two from Cravens.

Hyde was played by Ron Rifkin in Norma Jean & Marilyn, Richard Basehart in the TV movie Marilyn: The Untold Story, Joel Grey in the TV movie Marilyn and Me, and Lloyd Bridges in the TV miniseries Moviola episode "This Year's Blonde" And Tony Nardi in the 2015 Lifetime® Two part biographical Drama miniseries The Secret Life of Marilyn Monroe.
