= Bite Club (TV series) =

Australian television series

- Genre: Crime thriller
- Written by: John Ridley; Sarah Smith
- Directed by: Peter Andrikidis; Geoff Bennett; Wayne Blair; Jennifer Leacey
- Starring: Todd Lasance; Ash Ricardo; Dominic Monaghan; Damian Walshe-Howling; Deborah Mailman; Robert Mammone; Pia Miller; Marny Kennedy; Darcie Irwin-Simpson
- Country of origin: Australia
- Original language: English
- No. of episodes: 8

Production
- Executive producers: Andy Ryan; Jo Rooney; David Maher; David Taylor; Sarah Smith
- Producer: Sue Seeary
- Production location: Sydney, Australia
- Running time: 44 minutes
- Production company: Playmaker Media

Original release
- Network: Nine Network
- Release: 15 August – 3 October 2018

Bite Club is an Australian crime thriller television series which aired on the Nine Network from 15 August to 3 October 2018. The show centres around a group of shark attack survivors, named the "Bite Club", who are being targeted by a serial killer. It stars Todd Lasance and Ash Ricardo as Detectives Dan Cooper and Zoe Rawlings, along with Dominic Monaghan as Senior Constable Stephen Langley.

== Production ==
On 4 October 2017, the series was announced, with Dominic Monaghan set to star in a lead role. On 11 October, the series was officially confirmed at Nine's upfronts set to air in 2018. The eight-part series began airing on 15 August 2018.

The show centres around a group of shark attack survivors, named the "Bite Club", who are being targeted by a serial killer. Todd Lasance and Ash Ricardo play Detectives Dan Cooper and Zoe Rawlings, who are trying to catch the killer. Monaghan plays Senior Constable Stephen Langley. The rest of the cast includes, Damian Walshe-Howling as psychologist Kristof Olsen, Deborah Mailman as Superintendent Anna Morton, Robert Mammone as Detective Sergeant Jim Russo, Marny Kennedy as semi-pro surfer Amber Wells, Darcie Irwin-Simpson as Detective Claire Hobson, Arka Das as Forensic Specialist Depak Chaudhary, and Pia Miller as Zoe's best friend Kate Summers. Actress Jessica Falkholt will make a posthumous appearance, following her death on 17 January 2018.

Bite Club is written by Sarah Smith and John Ridley, and directed by Peter Andrikidis, Geoff Bennett, Wayne Blair and Jennifer Leacey.

Bite Club began filming on-location in the suburb of Manly in September 2017. Filming took place at Dee Why, Curl Curl Beach and The Steyne pub. The Manly Pavilion became the outside of a police station, while the interior rooms were built at North Head. Other locations considered for the show's setting included Bondi and Maroubra. Filming for the series ended on 7 December 2017.

== Cast ==
- Todd Lasance as Detective Constable Dan Cooper
- Ash Ricardo as Detective Senior Constable Zoe Rawlings
- Dominic Monaghan as Senior Constable Stephen Langley
- Deborah Mailman as Superintendent Anna Morton
- Damian Walshe-Howling as Kristof Olsen
- Robert Mammone as Detective Sergeant Jim Russo
- Pia Miller as Kate Summers
- Marny Kennedy as Amber Wells
- Darcie Irwin-Simpson as Detective Claire Hobson
- Arka Das as Depak Chaudhary
- Jessica Falkholt as Emma Bailey
- Susan Prior as Tricia
- Jessica Napier as Pia

== Episodes ==
No.	Title	Directed by	Original release date	Prod. code	Aus. viewers
1	Episode 1	Geoff Bennett	15 August 2018	306489-1	509,000
2	Episode 2	Jennifer Leacey	22 August 2018	306489-2	443,000
3	Episode 3	Jennifer Leacey	29 August 2018	306489-3	490,000
4	Episode 4	Geoff Bennett	5 September 2018	306489-4	456,000
5	Episode 5	Wayne Blair	12 September 2018	306489-5	469,000
6	Episode 6	Wayne Blair	19 September 2018	306489-6	449,000
7	Episode 7	Peter Andrikidis	26 September 2018	306489-7	435,000
8	Episode 8	Peter Andrikidis	3 October 2018	306489-8	505,000

== Reception ==
=== Critical reception ===
David Knox of TV Tonight gave the opening episode two and a half stars out of five. He wrote, "Melodrama is part of the problem of this drama which needs to commit to one of the two genres it straddles. For a crime about a serial killer the travelogue shots and warm hues is pretty confusing." Knox disliked Leacey's "sluggish" direction, and felt that the episode was lacking in energy. He added that the first episode needed to be stronger, with "a bit more teeth to take hold."

In 2020, Fiona Byrne of the Herald Sun included Bite Club in her feature about "long forgotten Australian TV dramas that made viewers switch off." Byrne called the premise "ridiculous", but said the drama "looked good" with its location shots and the cast were "impressive." She continued: "But the audience simply did not buy the storyline and did not care about the show. It came and went very quickly as a blink-and-you-miss-it one season wonder."

=== Ratings ===
No.	Title	Air date	Overnight ratings		Consolidated ratings		Total viewers	Ref(s)
No.	Title	Air date	Viewers	Rank	Viewers	Rank	Total viewers	Ref(s)
1	Episode 1	15 August 2018	509,000	17	90,000	15	599,000	
2	Episode 2	22 August 2018	443,000	19	105,000	17	548,000	
3	Episode 3	29 August 2018	490,000	17	104,000	13	594,000	
4	Episode 4	5 September 2018	456,000	17	108,000	13	564,000	
5	Episode 5	12 September 2018	469,000	17	104,000	16	573,000	
6	Episode 6	19 September 2018	449,000	20	103,000	17	552,000	
7	Episode 7	26 September 2018	435,000	18	124,000	14	559,000	
8	Episode 8	3 October 2018	505,000	16	3,000	16	508,000	

== Home media ==
The complete series of Bite Club is available on 9Now and Stan in Australia.

Title	Format	Ep #	Release date	Expiry Date	Special features	Distributor
Bite Club	Streaming	08	2019		Interviews With Cast; Best Moments	9Now
