= Internal mail =

Intraorganizational mail delivery

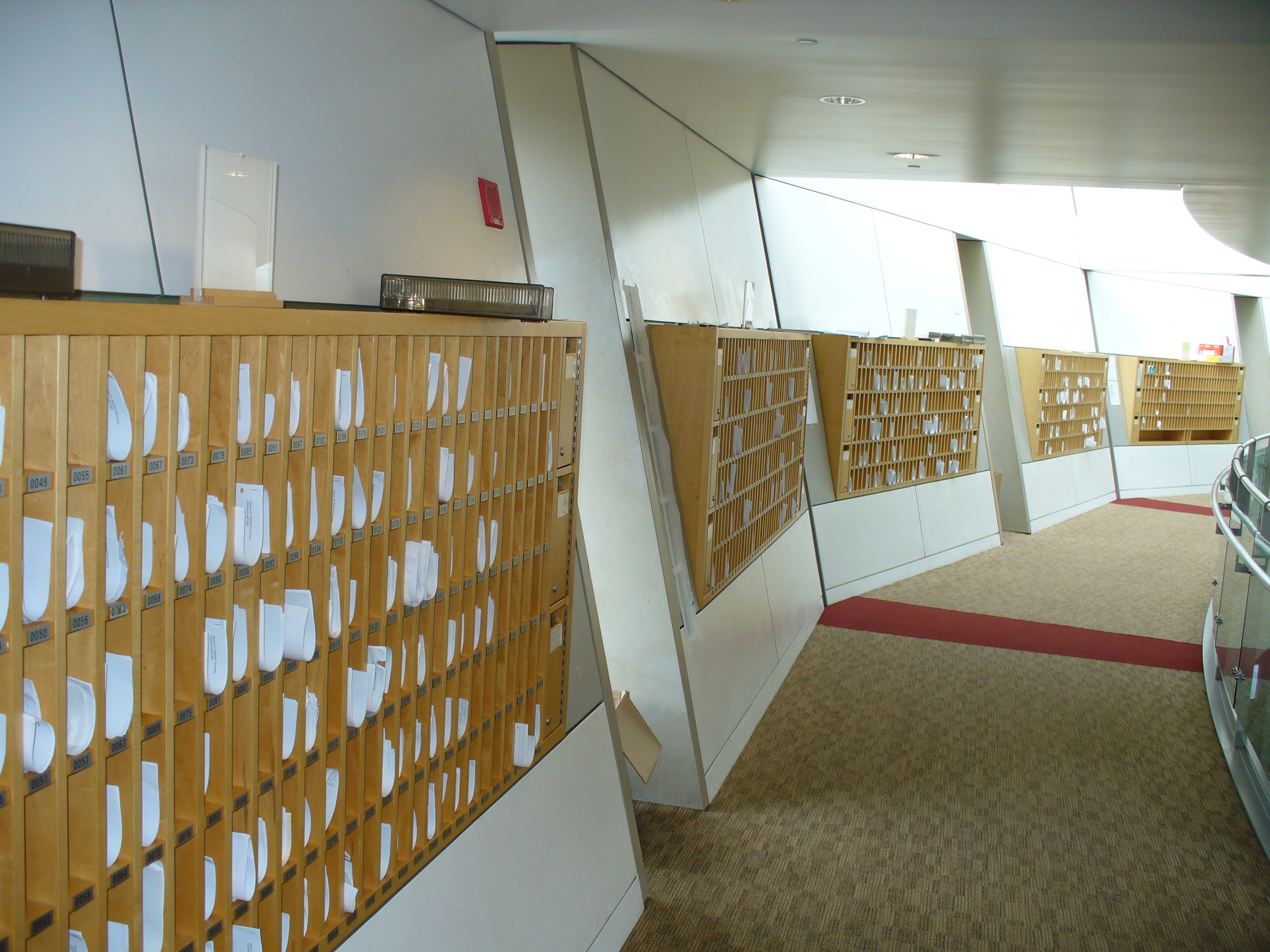
Pigeon-hole messageboxes at Stanford University, California, USA

In a large organization with many employees, there is frequently an internal mail system. The post room or mail room sorts the incoming mail and the 'mailboy' or 'mail clerk' takes it around on a trolly to the various pigeon-holes and direct to the desks of other colleagues.

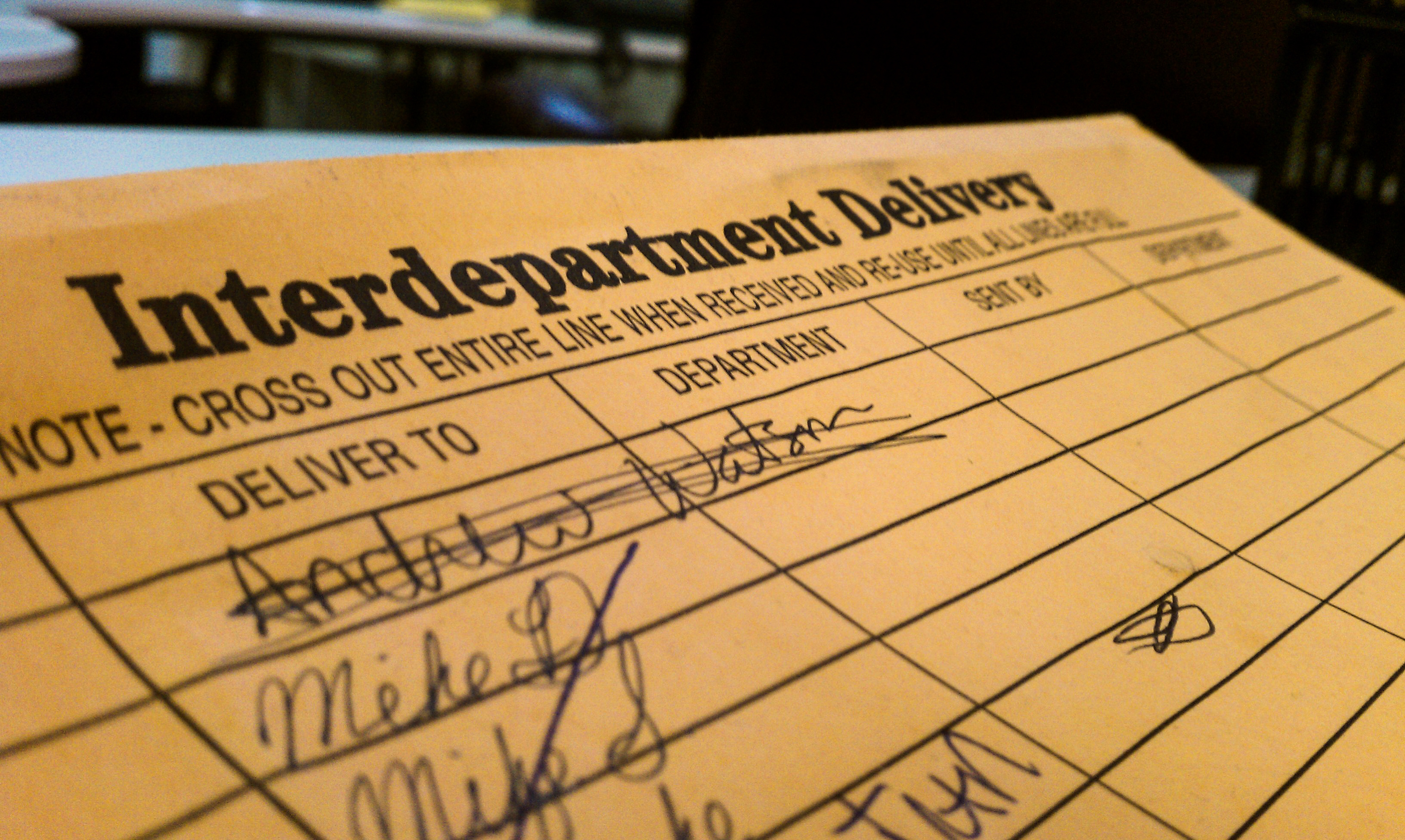
Interdepartment Delivery inter-office envelope

== Mailroom ==
This is the name of the department or the room where mail is sorted internally within a large organisation. Mailroom is used primarily by US companies and Post room by UK companies and organisations (e.g. hospitals and universities.)

== Central distribution ==
This is where goods as opposed to letters are delivered to and distributed from. Small packets and letters in bulk (e.g. mailsacks) would be sent on to the mailroom. Goods are often heavy and bulky and may require specialist handling (e.g. fragile), lifting equipment (forklifts for pallets) and transportation devices (sacktrucks, motorised trollies, vans and flatbeds) and are therefore rarely handled by the mailroom.

== Internal mail ==
This is the name for mail which is sent and received between employees and departments. Internal mail will often use a special envelope which can be reused. It is common for them to have many address boxes that are used in order. The most recent box is the current delivery address.

1. An employee with a desk places mail in their out tray.
2. An employee without a desk places mail in the pigeonhole for the recipient of the mail or the one marked internal mail.
3. The post room worker collects mail from the out tray of every desk and also the internal mail pigeonhole of every department
4. The post room worker sorts the mail by department using the wallets on their trolley
5. The post room worker visits every department
6. The mail is placed in the in tray of the intended employee or in their pigeonhole

== External mail ==
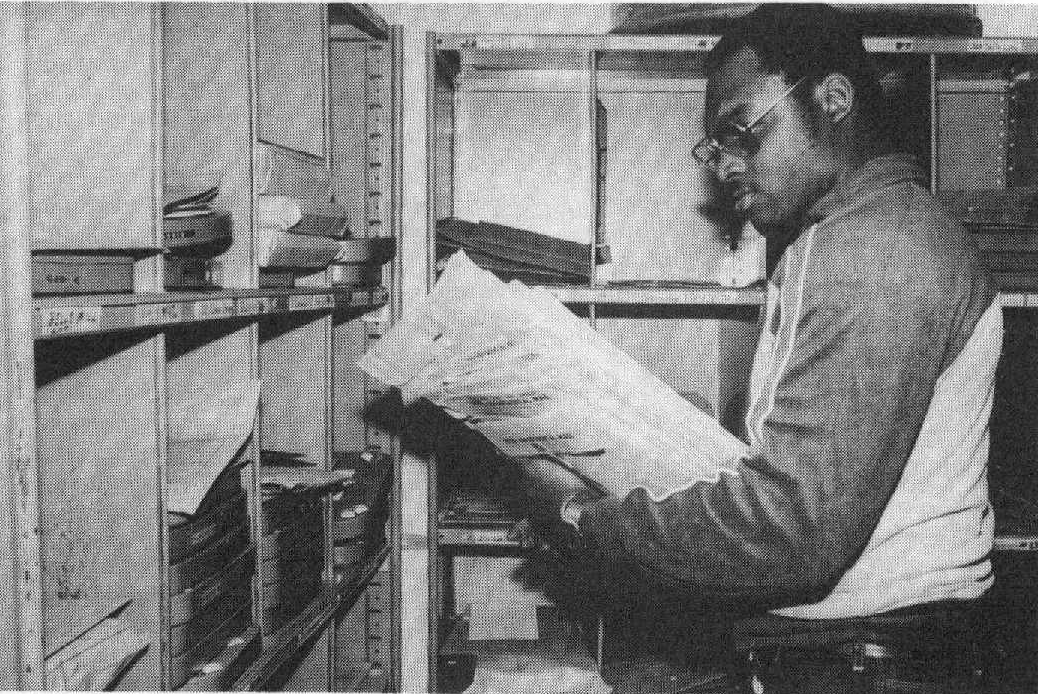
Mail clerk sorting mail. (1992)

This is the name used to describe mail which comes from or is going to another organisation.

=== Outgoing mail ===
1. An employee with a desk places mail in their out tray or in the pigeonhole marked external mail.
2. The mailboy collects the mail from the out tray and collects mail from the departmental pigeonholes marked external mail
3. The mailboy places external mail in the external mail wallet on his trolly.
4. The mailboy visits the mail room
5. External mail is passed to the postmaster or another mail clerk
6. The mail is weighed, stamped, franked etc. and is collected by the national mail service

=== Incoming mail ===
1. The national mail service deliver the mail once or more per day.
2. The postmaster or a mail clerk sorts the mail by department.
3. The mailboy collects the mail from the mailroom and places it in the appropriate departmental wallet on his trolley.
4. The mailboy visits every department.
5. The mail is delivered to the employee's desk or their pigeonhole.

== Pigeon-hole ==
This is the departmental system of mail delivery for employees that don't have a desk.

== Letter trays ==
This is where mail is delivered to or received from when an employee has a desk. Each desk has a minimum of three letter trays labelled, in, out and pending. The in tray is where mail is received. The out tray is mail that is waiting to be collected. The pending tray is for documents that cannot be worked on at present because input from another person is required, or the requests are low priority. Sometimes additional trays are used for post, filing, dictation, etc. according to the needs of the individual or organisation.

== Postmaster ==
This person usually works independently and is responsible for a company's incoming and outgoing mail. They are in charge of the mailroom and all of the employees that work there.

== Mailroom clerk ==
A person who works in a mailroom is known as a mailroom clerk, mailroom operator or post room operator. A mailroom clerk deals with the preparation of packaged goods, letters, and other mail for shipping by the local post office or by an independent shipping service. A mailroom clerk's job may be with a private firm, government agency, non-profit group, or a military operation. In some small companies, the pigeonholes are in the reception area so the receptionist may take on this role.

== Mailboy ==
Mailboy is an American traditional name for the mailroom clerk who collects and delivers mail within a large organization. A 'mailboy', delivers mail for other employees in different departments using a mail cart or a trolley often sorting as he goes using the pouches or wallets that are part of the trolley. It is typically the most junior of roles and many employees start here so they can get a feel for the entire organization, get to know everyone rapidly, and then to decide where in an organization they would like to train for and work within. In the modern workplace it is a role suitable for people with learning difficulties and helps an organization meet legislative quotas. A trolley with many slots is frequently used so that sorting can take place while the trolley does its rounds thereby reducing the amount of mail that has to be sorted in the mailroom.

== Automated systems ==
Some companies use an automated system to assist with mail. Tracks which loop around the building carry the mail between the mailroom and the departmental mailrooms or reception areas. The mail and small packets are placed on "trucks" or "trollies" which are programmed with the destination.

== See also ==
- Mail services center
- Digital mailroom
- Post office
- Postal services
- Mail
- Sorting office
