= Christopher Whitesell =

American television soap opera writer

- Born: Iowa Falls, Iowa, U.S.
- Occupation: Television writer
- Family: Sean Whitesell (brother); Patrick Whitesell (brother); John Whitesell (brother); Jim Whitesell (brother); Maria Quiban (sister-in-law)

Christopher Whitesell is an American television soap opera writer. He has served as either co-head writer, associate head writer, or a breakdown writer on the shows he has worked. In April 2012, he was named co-head writer of Days of Our Lives with Gary Tomlin, replacing Marlene Clark McPherson and Darrell Ray Thomas who had been let go.

== Biography ==
Whitesell is the son of Patricia and John Patrick "Jack" Whitesell. His brothers are the late film and television actor Sean Whitesell, Thomas Whitesell, talent agent Patrick Whitesell, college basketball coach James Whitesell, and director John Whitesell.

== Positions held ==
Another World

- Associate head writer: 1988–1991, 1995–1996

As the World Turns

- Breakdown writer: 1987–1988 (hired by Douglas Marland), 2003–2005 (hired by Hogan Sheffer)
- Co-head writer: May 25, 2005 – October 17, 2007 (with Jean Passanante & Leah Laiman)

Days of Our Lives

- Associate head writer: 2000–2001
- Co-head writer: October 13, 2008 – June 13, 2011 (with Dena Higley, hired by Gary Tomlin)
- Co-headwriter: August 17, 2012 – August 18, 2015 (with Gary Tomlin, hired by Ken Corday)

General Hospital

- Co-head writer: May – December 5, 1997
- Associate head writer: 1997
- Breakdown writer: November 20, 2015 – December 1, 2017

Guiding Light

- Associate head writer: 1984–1986

One Life to Live

- Co-head writer: 2001 – January 31, 2003
- Associate head writer: 1993–1995 (hired by Michael Malone)

Sunset Beach

- Co-head writer: January 8, 1998 – December 31, 1999 (with Meg Bennett: till October 8, 1998; then Margaret DePriest)

The Young and the Restless

- Breakdown writer: June 21, 2011 – June 11, 2012

== Awards and nominations ==
Daytime Emmy Awards

NOMINATIONS

- (2006; Best Writing; As the World Turns)
- (1995 & 2002; Best Writing; One Life to Live)
- (1989; Best Writing; Another World)
- (1985; Best Writing; Guiding Light)

WINS

- (2004–2005; Best Writing; As the World Turns)
- (1994; Best Writing; One Life to Live)
- (1986; Best Writing; Guiding Light)

Writers Guild of America Award

NOMINATIONS

- 2005 season; As the World Turns
- 2001 season; Days of Our Lives
- 1997 & 1998 season; General Hospital
- 1997 season; Another World
- 1994 season; One Life to Live
- 1984 & 1985 season; Guiding Light
