= William Morris Agency =

American talent agency (1898–2009)

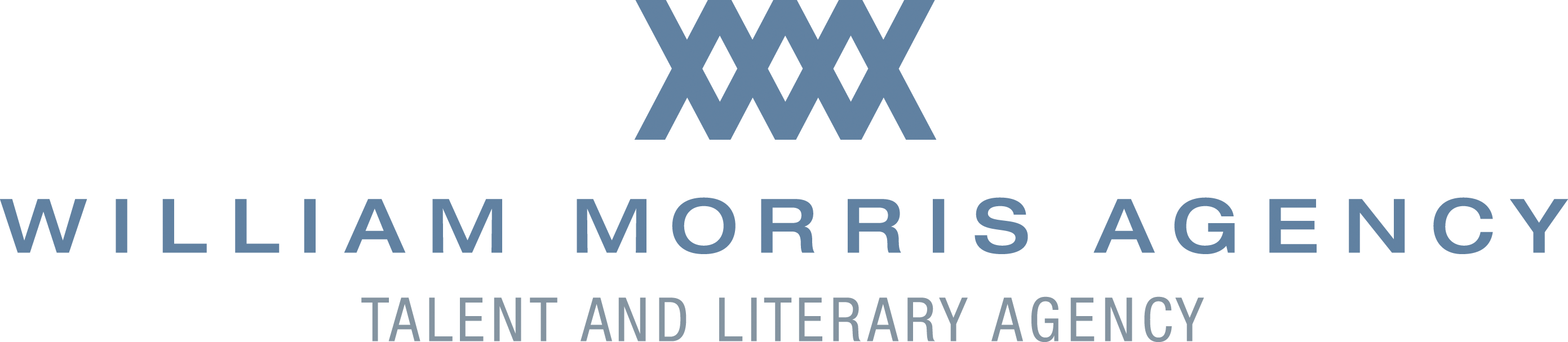
- Industry: Talent and literary agencies
- Founded: 1898; 128 years ago in New York City, U.S.
- Founder: William Morris
- Defunct: April 27, 2009; 17 years ago
- Fate: Merged with Endeavor Talent Agency
- Successor: WME Group
- Headquarters: Beverly Hills, California, U.S.

The William Morris Agency (WMA) was an American talent agency, that represented some of the best-known 20th-century entertainers in film, television, and music. During its 109-year tenure it came to be regarded as the "first great talent agency in show business".

In April 2009, WMA announced it would merge with the Endeavor Talent Agency to form William Morris Endeavor. William Morris Endeavor was renamed WME-IMG in 2013, then Endeavor in October 2017.

== History ==
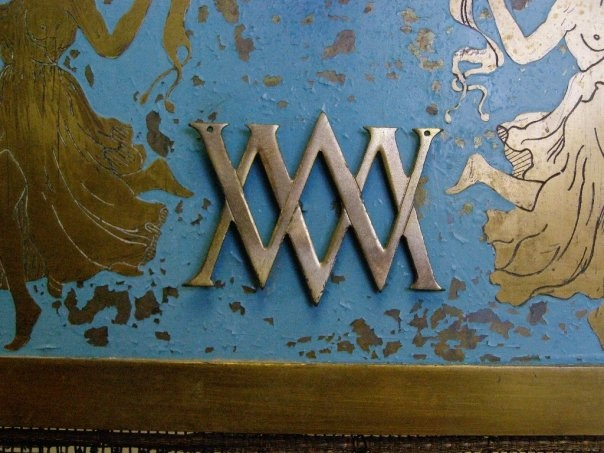
William Morris Fireplace Screen with monogram

=== Early history ===
In 1898, William Morris (born Zelman Moses), a German-Jewish immigrant to the US, posted a cross-hatch trademark above an office door in New York City – four "X's", representing a W superimposed on an M – and went into business as William Morris, Vaudeville Agent. By the time WMA formally incorporated in New York State on January 31, 1918, Morris' son William Morris Jr. and his assistant Abraham Lastfogel, who after working as Morris Jr.'s office boy and establishing his own talent/employment agency, partnered with Morris Sr.

As silent film grew into widely viewed entertainment, Morris encouraged his clients to experiment in the new medium. Stars such as Charlie Chaplin, Al Jolson, the Marx Brothers, and Mae West were all represented by the company.

By 1930, Morris had turned over leadership of the agency to his son and Lastfogel. In 1932, five years after his retirement, William Morris Sr. died from heart failure. By that time, the Agency had begun the process of relocating from Hollywood and Vine to Canon Drive in Beverly Hills. William Morris Jr. succeeded his father as president of the company and was co-owner with Lastfogel.

=== 1945–2000 ===
In December 1949, the William Morris Agency acquired the Berg-Allenberg Agency (founded by Phil Berg and Bert Allenberg). The senior agent in the motion picture department during the 1950s was Mike Zimring. In 1952, William Morris Jr. retired as president. He remained a director until 1969. Lastfogel succeeded William Morris Jr. as president and, under him, the agency moved into the television industry. In the 1950s, Morris Stoller set up an international division and by 1980, the agency had offices in London, Rome and Munich.

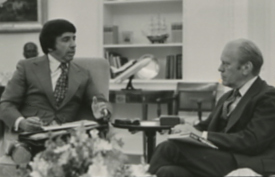
President Gerald Ford (right) meets in the Oval Office with a representative of the William Morris Agency to discuss advertising for his 1976 campaign.

By 1965, WMA's Music Department was representing several clients including the Rolling Stones, Sonny & Cher, the Beach Boys and the Byrds. In 1969 Lastfogel relinquished his job as president and became chairman. Nat Lefkowitz became president. In 1973, the Agency's newly established Nashville office provided another significant boost to the operations of William Morris, extending the Agency's reach into country music and beyond. In 1976, Sam Weisbord, who had been with the agency since 1929, replaced Lefkowitz as president. Lefkowitz was named as co-chairman of the firm (in 1936, Lefkowitz hired his nephew, Ted Ashley, at William Morris, who would go on to found the Ashley-Famous talent agency). In 1980, Stoller, who had joined the agency in 1937, was named chairman. Lastfogel and Lefkowitz became chairmen emeritus.

In the early 1980s, WMA built the William Morris Plaza located at 150 El Camino Drive, directly across the street from its main building at 151 El Camino. In 1984, Lee Stevens became president and chief executive officer, replacing Weisbord, who became chairman with Stoller.

In 1989, WMA acquired the Jim Halsey Company.

In the early 1990s, WMA's Literary Department announced the largest book-to-screen deal ever inked when it sold the television rights for Scarlett, the sequel to Margaret Mitchell's Gone With the Wind. In 2000, WMA acquired The Writers Shop, which was owned by Jennifer Rudolph Walsh.

=== 2000–2009 ===
In 2003, WMA opened an office in Miami Beach, and in 2004 they opened an office in Shanghai. In 2007, the Agency expanded its London music operation, underscoring WMA's continued commitment to the international marketplace. Along with the addition of new personnel, the London office moved into Centre Point Tower.

In 2003, a seismic shift occurred in the agency landscape when WMA's SVP and Theatre topper, George Lane, and fellow agent in charge of foreign rights, Michael Cardonick, left WMA to open Creative Artists Agency's New York City office and Theatrical Department.

==== Merger with Endeavor ====
On April 27, 2009, WMA and the Endeavor Talent Agency announced that they were merging to form William Morris Endeavor. Endeavor executives Ari Emanuel and Patrick Whitesell were widely recognized as the architects of the deal and ultimately took the roles of WME Co-CEOs. Following the official announcement of the merger, nearly 100 WMA employees and former board members were let go. One of those leaving was Jim Wiatt, who came to WMA in 1999 from International Creative Management, where he was vice-chairman. He had joined WMA as president and co-chief executive officer, and had risen to board chairman.

After the merger, WMA relocated its offices to the Endeavor building at 9601 Wilshire Boulevard in Beverly Hills, California.

== WMA Agent Training Program ==
The WMA Agent Training Program, often referred to as the "mailroom", was established in the 1940s and is well known for its roster of successful alumni. Since the 1970s the program has been replicated at other talent agencies and studios, many of which were headed by former mailroom trainees. Once accepted, trainees rotate through different departments, starting with the mailroom, before becoming a full-time assistant or coordinator.

WMA's longtime competitor, Creative Artists Agency, was founded in 1975 by Michael Ovitz, Ronald Meyer, William Haber, Michael S. Rosenfeld, and Rowland Perkins, all former WMA agent trainees. David Geffen once called the WMA Agent Training Program "The Harvard School of Show Business – only better: no grades, no exams, a small stipend and great placement opportunities." Graduates from the Training Program were perceived at a high level of prestige within the entertainment industry, because of the caliber of notable alums that have graduated from the program.

Future chairman Norman Brokaw became the first mailboy in the Beverly Hills Mailroom at age 15. The Agent Training program still exists today at William Morris Endeavor. It was famously documented in David Rensin's 2003 book, The Mailroom: Hollywood History from the Bottom Up.
