= Pigeon-hole messagebox =

Method for communicating in organizations

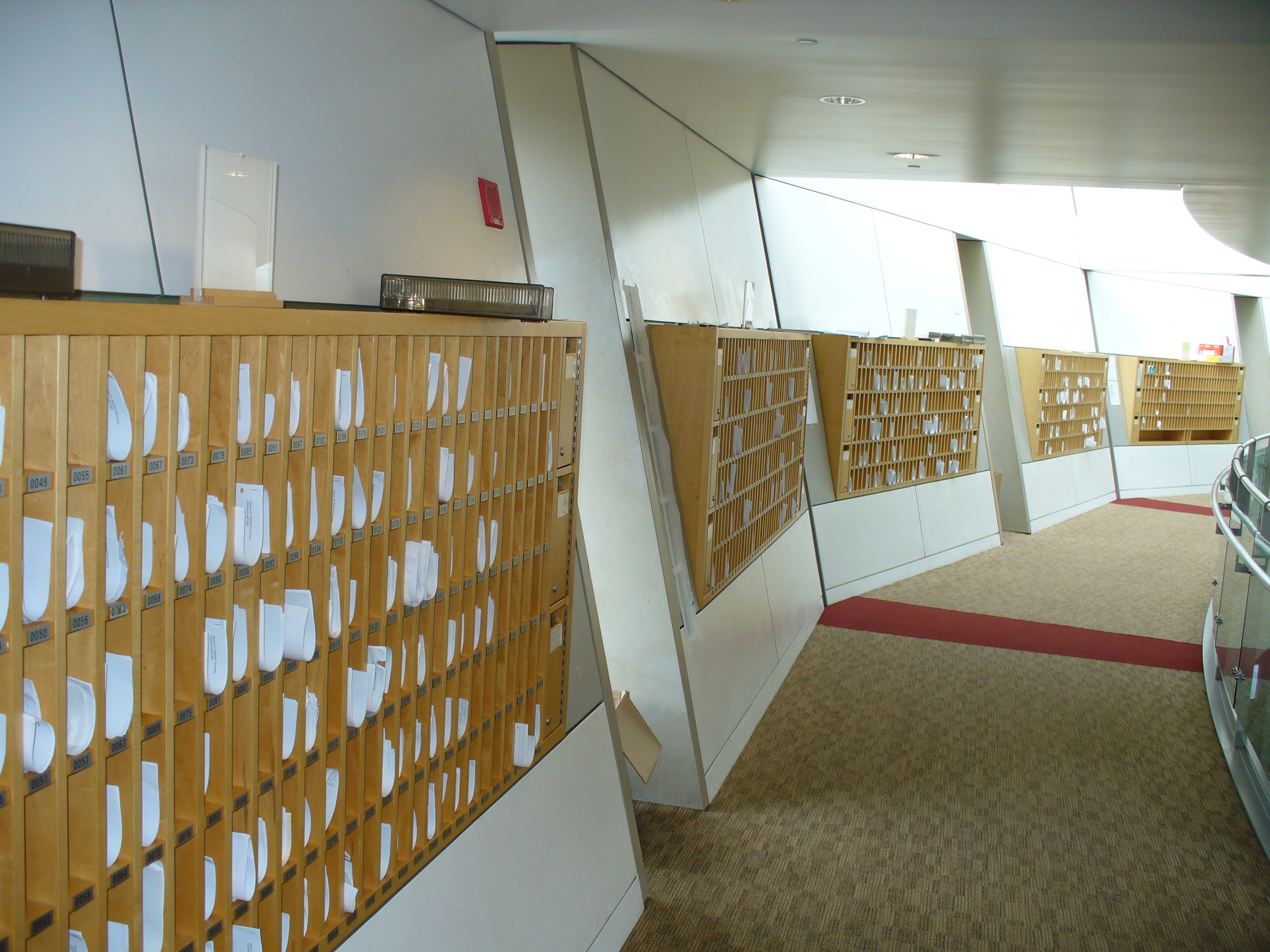
Pigeon-hole messageboxes at Stanford University

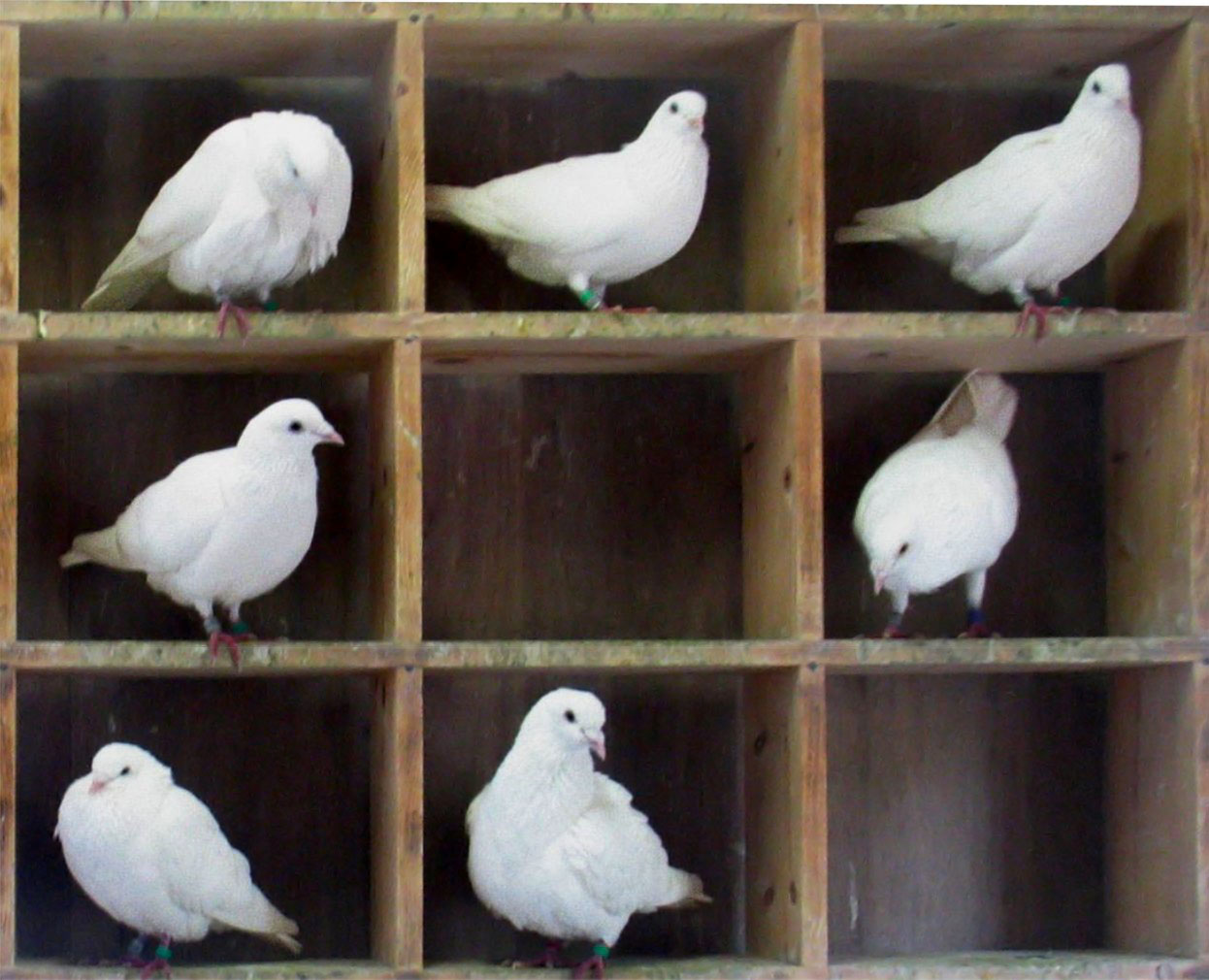
The inspiration for the name: racing pigeons being held in compartments

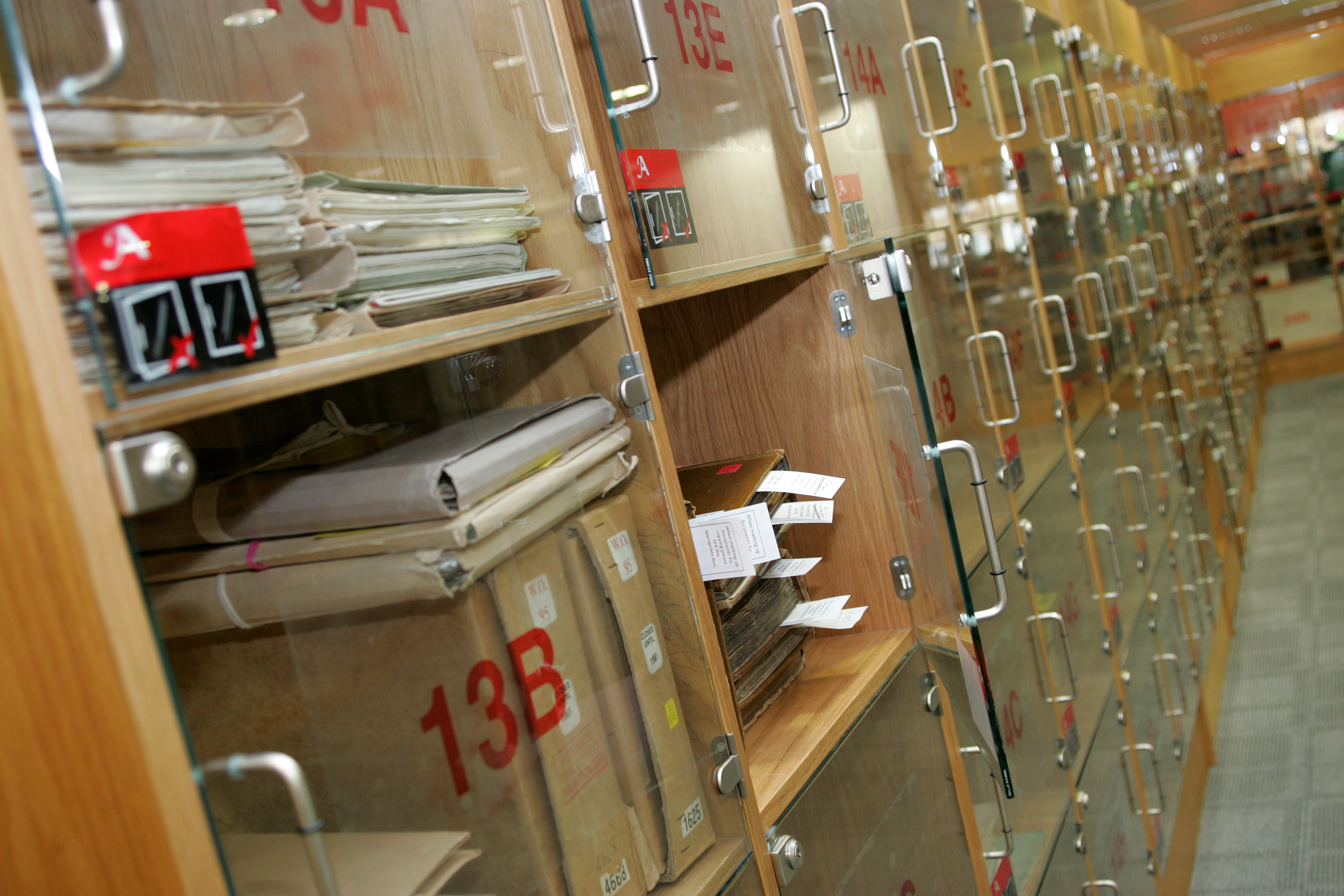
Documents ordered by readers at The National Archives

A pigeon-hole messagebox (commonly referred to as a pigeon-hole, pidge, cubbyhole (often shortened to "cubby") or simply as a mailbox) is an internal mail system commonly used for communication in organisations, workplaces and educational institutes. Documents and messages are placed in a person's pigeon-hole for them to collect; they can reply by putting a response inside the sender's pigeon-hole. In large organisations the mailboy delivers mail to departmental pigeon holes from the postroom (UK) or mailroom (US). Pigeon-hole message boxes are also used in research institutions, libraries, and archives to provide researchers with secure access to archival records, rare books, and other unique material that cannot be removed from the premises.

In medieval times pigeons were kept as domestic birds, not for racing but for their meat. Pigeon holes were the openings set in a wall or a purpose-built pigeon cote in which the birds nested. By 1789, the arrangement of compartments in writing cabinets and offices used to sort and file documents had come to be known as pigeon holes because of their resemblance to the pigeon cote. By the mid 19th century, pigeon hole was being used as a verb meaning either to put a matter to one side with the intention of coming back to it later, or to classify information. It is possible the name has stuck because of the simple word association with pigeon post.

Cubbies are also used in American preschools and kindergartens as places to store backpacks, lunchboxes, and jackets.

Pigeon hole mail boxes are used by postal offices in the United Kingdom, as they allow for easy categorising of mail for later preparation of items ready for dispatch. Boxes are grouped in postcode areas with identification tabs usually fixed onto the top-left hand corner of the box allowing for easy entry and retrieval of items. Pigeon hole mail boxes can be mounted upon caster feet allowing for rearrangement of boxes to meet current processing demands.

In the 1960s, under Court Postmaster William King, Buckingham Palace's Post Office branch included pigeon holes for Master of the Household, Equerry in Waiting, Privy Purse Door, and Sergeant Footman.

== See also ==
- Pigeonhole principle
- Pigeonhole sort
