= Ash Ricardo =

Australian actress

- Born: Ashley Vivienne Ricardo; Sydney, Australia
- Occupation: Actress
- Years active: 2003–present

Ash Ricardo is an Australian actress. She is best known for playing Kerry Green in Network Ten's Offspring and Detective Zoe Rawlings in the Channel Nine crime thriller Bite Club.

== Early life ==
Ricardo was born in Sydney to an Italian family. She studied acting at the National Institute of Dramatic Art.

== Career ==
Ricardo's first big role of her career was when she played Kerry Green in Offspring with Asher Keddie. She then played a minor role in the 2017 Marvel superhero Thor sequel Thor: Ragnarok, alongside Chris Hemsworth, before landing one of the lead roles in the crime thriller series Bite Club, with Todd Lasance and Dominic Monaghan. She has most recently played the role of Jennifer Falk in 2014 mystery thriller film Force of Nature: The Dry 2, opposite Eric Bana.

Ricardo has also appeared in many theatre productions for Sydney Theatre Company such as Noises Off and Les Liaisons Dangereuses along with Hugo Weaving.

== Personal life ==
Ricardo revealed she has suffered miscarriages. Since she was 16, she has been battling excruciating period pain. When she was 26, she had three ovarian cysts that exploded. At the age of 32, she and her partner decided they wanted children. She then underwent surgery to find out if she had endometriosis, which she had long expected. When the results showed she had it, she got it cleared out. Soon afterwards, she had a son named Jameson. Ricardo gave birth to a second son named Holden Ricardo Meadows on 28 September 2023.

== Filmography ==
=== Film ===
Year	Title	Role	Notes
2003	Pretentious	KC	
2004	Coffee, Tea, or Me?	Ebony	Short
2005	The Rules	Brie	Short
2006	Convictions	Mel Johnson	
2011	Snobs	Amber	
2012	Grace	Grace	Short
2012	Ravage	Annabelle	Short
2013	Around the Block	TV journalist	
2013	Caught on Camera	Ana	Short
2013	Between Us	Juliet	Short
2015	Now Add Honey	Mindi	
2015	Observance	Receptionist	
2015	Mary: The Making of a Princess	Patricia Donaldson	
2017	Event Zero	Leyla Nassar	
2022	Thor: Ragnarok	Odin's assistant	
2023	Contagion of Fear	Leyla Nassar	
2024	Force of Nature: The Dry 2	Jennifer Falk	

=== Television ===
Year	Title	Role	Notes
2009	Packed to the Rafters	Tarsha McNeil	Episode: Look into my Eyes
2009	Rescue: Special Ops	Abigal	Episode: Building Site
2012	Tricky Business	Natasha Campbell	Episode: Opportunity Knocks
2014	Old School	Diane Cavendish	Episode: Tiny Dancer
2014	Party Tricks	Charlotte Wynn	6 episodes
2016	Molly	Joy	2 episodes
2016	Home and Away	Danika Kulevski	7 episodes
2016	The Wild Adventures of Blinky Bill	Claude	2 episodes
2016-2017	Offspring	Kerry Green	15 episodes
2018	Bite Club	Zoe Rawlings	8 episodes
2020	Colour Blind	Alisha	Miniseries
2020-2021	Space Nova	Aubrina Eridani	Voice, 11 episodes
2021	Clickbait	Dakota King	Episode: The Reporter
2021-present	RFDS	Mira Ortez	24 episodes
