= John Whitesell =

American television and film director

- Born: John Patrick Whitesell; Iowa Falls, Iowa, U.S.
- Education: Simpson College
- Occupations: Television and film director
- Spouse: Jolie Barnett
- Family: Sean Whitesell (brother); Patrick Whitesell (brother); Chris Whitesell (brother); Jim Whitesell (brother); Maria Quiban (sister-in-law)

John Patrick Whitesell is an American television and film director. He has directed numerous films such as Calendar Girl, Big Momma's House 2 and Holidate. He started his career as a film director in 1993.

== Early life and education ==
Whitesell is the son of Patricia and John Patrick "Jack" Whitesell. He has five brothers Sean Whitesell, Christopher Whitesell, Thomas, Patrick Whitesell, and James Whitesell. Originally from Iowa Falls, Iowa, Whitesell attended Simpson College, before moving to New York City to study acting and directing at Circle in The Square.

== Career ==
His credits include Law & Order, Roseanne, Doctor, Doctor, A Different World, Baby Boom, Costello, Coach and Tattingers.

He won a Daytime Emmy Award (Outstanding Direction For A Daytime Drama Series - John Whitesell, Bruce S. Barry, Matthew Diamond, Irene M. Pace, Robert D. Kochman, Joanne Rivituso, and Joanne Sedwick) for his work on CBS Daytime's Guiding Light, and worked on Another World (NBC Daytime), Texas and Search for Tomorrow (as executive producer from November 1985 - December 1986)."

== Theatre ==
His theater credits include Happily Ever After, And That's the Way It Was, Solo for Two Voices, Towards Zero, and The Glass Menagerie.

== Personal life ==
He is married to Jolie Barnett. They are members of Kehillat Israel.

== Filmography as director ==
- Calendar Girl (1993)
- See Spot Run (2001)
- House Blend (2002 CBS unaired pilot)
- Malibu's Most Wanted (2003)
- Big Momma's House 2 (2006)
- Deck the Halls (2006)
- Big Mommas: Like Father, Like Son (2011)
- Thunderstruck (2012)
- Holidate (2020)
