= Sean Whitesell =

American actor (1963–2015)

- Born: March 11, 1963; Iowa Falls, Iowa, U.S.
- Died: December 28, 2015 (aged 52); Los Angeles, California, U.S.
- Education: University of Northern Iowa (BA); University of California, San Diego (MFA)
- Occupations: Actor; writer; producer
- Spouse: Maria Quiban
- Children: 1
- Family: John Whitesell (brother); Chris Whitesell (brother); Patrick Whitesell (brother); Jim Whitesell (brother)

Sean Whitesell (March 11, 1963 – December 28, 2015) was an American film and television actor, writer and producer.

== Early life and education ==
Whitesell was born in Iowa Falls, Iowa, the son of Patricia and John Patrick "Jack" Whitesell. He had five brothers: John II, Christopher, Thomas, Patrick, and James. He graduated from the University of Northern Iowa where he played for the Northern Iowa Panthers men's basketball team before transferring to Mount Marty College. He later studied acting at the University of California, San Diego, where he received an MFA in acting.

== Career ==
Whitesell is best known for his portrayal of cannibalistic inmate Donald Groves, the initial cellmate of Miguel Alvarez (Kirk Acevedo), in season one of HBO's Oz, on which he was a regular until his character's execution.

In 2002, Whitesell returned to the show, but not to act; he wrote and produced several episodes in the show's later seasons. Whitesell acted almost exclusively in television, aside from some early minor film roles, such as in Calendar Girl opposite Jason Priestley. He also served as both a writer and a recurring guest actor on Homicide: Life on the Street, in addition to appearing in the television movie that concluded the series in 2000. Although Whitesell did no further acting after the end of Homicide ended, he was a producer for most of the fourth season of House, and also wrote one episode, "Ugly". He also produced and wrote for several other successful series, including The Black Donnellys, Boston Public and Cold Case.

== Personal life ==
Whitesell was married to KTTV weather anchor and morning meteorologist Maria Quiban Whitesell; they had one son, Gus. Whitesell died on December 28, 2015, in Los Angeles from glioblastoma multiforme, aged 52. Services were held at Saint Paul the Apostle Catholic Church in Los Angeles.

== Filmography ==
=== Film ===
Year	Title	Role	Notes
1993	Ghost Brigade	Raider	
1993	Calendar Girl	Officer	

=== Television ===
Year	Title	Role	Notes
1990	Law & Order	Intern	Episode: "Prescription for Death"
1991	N.Y.P.D. Mounted	2nd Jogger	Television film
1992	Silk Stalkings	James Vannoker	Episode: "Curtain Call"
1992	Flying Blind	Waiter	Episode: "Crazy for You... and You"
1993	Hangin' with Mr. Cooper	Mountie	Episode: "Boyz in the Woodz"
1993	Johnny Bago	Officer #1	Episode: "Johnny Saves the World"
1993	And the Band Played On	Country Club Attendant	Television film
1993–1997	Homicide: Life on the Street	Dr. Eli Devilbiss	8 episodes; also producer and writer
1994	The Adventures of Brisco County, Jr.	Squad Sgt.	Episode: "High Treason: Part 1"
1994	The John Larroquette Show	Man	Episode: "A Bird in the Hand"
1997	Oz	Donald Groves	8 episodes; also producer and writer
2000	Homicide: The Movie	Dr. Eli Devilbliss	Television film
