= Calendar Girl (1993 film) =

1993 film by John Whitesell

- Theatrical release poster
- Directed by: John Whitesell
- Written by: Paul W. Shapiro
- Produced by: Debbie Robins
- Starring: Jason Priestley; Joe Pantoliano
- Cinematography: Tom Priestley Jr.
- Edited by: Wendy Greene Bricmont
- Music by: Hans Zimmer
- Production companies: Columbia Pictures; Parkway Productions
- Distributed by: Columbia Pictures
- Release date: September 3, 1993
- Running time: 90 minutes
- Language: English
- Box office: $2.5 million

Calendar Girl is a 1993 American comedy-drama film starring Jason Priestley, Gabriel Olds, and Jerry O'Connell. The film was directed by John Whitesell and written by Paul W. Shapiro. Set in 1962, it tells the story of three young men who go on a trip to Hollywood to fulfill their dream of meeting Marilyn Monroe. It has similarities to the real-life story of Gene Scanlon, who in 1953 crossed America with a friend and had a date with Marilyn Monroe for which she paid the bill.

== Plot ==
As kids three friends, Roy, Scott and Ned, obtain suggestive photographs of the celebrity Marilyn Monroe and develop an obsession. Now older, Roy sets his eyes on joining the Military despite a strained relationship with his father. Scott, is set to marry his sweet heart Becky. Ned, known affectionately as "Bleuer," works at a small town store. The three decide to go on a trip to California and fufil their lifelong dream of meeting Monroe.

Chaos ensues as they arrange over the top ideas to win over their idol. One includes corralling a "sad" cow to moo outside of Miss Monroe's luxurious residence. Another idea has them speeding after her towards a nude beach.

While an entirely separate subplot has them dodging some bad guys that are after Roy.

Nearing the end of their trip, they devise one final scheme. Roy asks Miss Monroe for a date. This leads to further despair amongst the trio. They begin to regret coming out for the trip and they decide to go out on the town one last time.

But, in a twist, Monroe finally agrees to a date upon the Californian beach. While initially resentment has grown between the three friends, Roy is eventually designated to be the lucky one that gets to meet Miss Monroe. He decides to pass off the opportunity to Bleuer. Bleuer treats the lovely Miss Monroe, but the night remains platonic. While Roy is disappointed by Bleuer's effort. The boys return home and learn the news that Marilyn has abruptly died of a drug overdose.

Back home, Scott continues his plans to marry his love, Becky. Roy tussles with his father in the gym, leading to one last moment before Roy shippes out to boot camp. In the last scene, Bleuer embraces his wild side, joining a party where he falls in love with a local college girl.

== Cast ==
- Jason Priestley as Roy "Bad Ass" Darpinian
- Gabriel Olds as Ned Bleuer
- Jerry O'Connell as Scott "Dood" Foreman
- Joe Pantoliano as Harvey Darpinian
- Steve Railsback as Mr. Darpinian
- Kurt Fuller as Arturo Gallo
- Lisa Stahl Sullivan as Delphine
- Stephen Tobolowsky as Antonio Gallo
- Emily Warfield as Becky O'Brien
- Leslie Wing as Mrs. Bleuer
- Christine Taylor as Melissa Smock
- Liz Vassey as Sylvia
- Maxwell Caulfield as Man in Bathrobe
- Chubby Checker as himself
- Stephanie Anderson as Marilyn Monroe
- Cortney Page as voice of Marilyn Monroe
- Tuesday Knight as Nude Woman
- Curt Truman as Bobby Kennedy, Jr.
- Joe Dietl as Usher

== Production ==
Producer Debbie Robins first brought the script, originally titled Me and Monroe, to Penny Marshall with the intent of Marshall directing. However, Marshall decided to direct the film Awakenings instead. Marshall retained executive producer credits through her production company, Parkway Productions.

Filming began on March 23, 1992, and concluded that May.

=== Casting controversy ===
Columbia Pictures did a nationwide search for a hearing-impaired actor to portray the deaf character Arturo Gallo, with thousands of deaf actors auditioning for the part. Ultimately the role went to Kurt Fuller, a hearing actor. Producers reasoned they could not find a deaf actor who fit the character's description as "6 foot 3 and Italian-looking". Columbia hired a sign language interpreter to train Fuller and ensure accuracy in his portrayal. The decision to cast a hearing actor as a deaf character ignited criticism in the deaf community, and the National Association of the Deaf organized protests in several cities across the country to coincide with the film's release date. In conjunction with these protests, a poster was commissioned with caricatures of Penny Marshall and Kurt Fuller; Marshall is acting as a puppeteer controlling Fuller's movements, while Fuller signs "I lie".

== Release ==
Calendar Girl film was originally planned for a release in April 1993, but this was delayed to August. It premiered on September 3, 1993, and grossed $2,570,550 domestically.

== Reception ==
The film received mostly negative reviews, with criticisms centered on some of the plot's improbabilities, particularly when the boys arrive in Hollywood and begin tracking down Monroe, in addition to the contrivances of the script. Owen Gleiberman of Entertainment Weekly wrote, "The film revives the voyeuristic smarminess of early-’80s spring-break comedies, only now it’s passed off as soulful nostalgia." Johanna Steinmetz of the Chicago Tribune commented the film "is all surface, with no depth of emotional field. We are told that each boy matures as a result of this caper, but we can't see it happen."

In a positive review, John Hartl of The Seattle Times wrote, "Sweet and airy and pleasantly nostalgic, Jason Priestley's first starring vehicle is cotton-candy entertainment for summer's end", and praised the chemistry of the three leads, saying they "form a natural ensemble". Emanuel Levy of Variety gave a largely negative review, but conceded "what Shapiro and first-time director John Whitesell do get right is the dynamics of the group, specifically Priestley’s leadership as a combination of persuasion, intimidation and manipulation".

Hartl said the film's glaring point is its script, which he said "never goes far enough". Writing for the Los Angeles Times, Michael Wilmington wrote, "And that's one of the things that's a little off about it: the suggestion that the dream isn't much different than the truth, that real-life Marilyn was exactly as she seemed in the movies."

On review aggregate website Rotten Tomatoes, Calendar Girl has an approval rating of 11% based on 19 reviews.

Audiences polled by CinemaScore gave the film an average grade of "C+" on an A+ to F scale.

== Home media ==
Calendar Girl was released on DVD by Sony Pictures Home on August 7, 2012.
