= Pia Whitesell =

Australian actress, model and television presenter (born 1983)

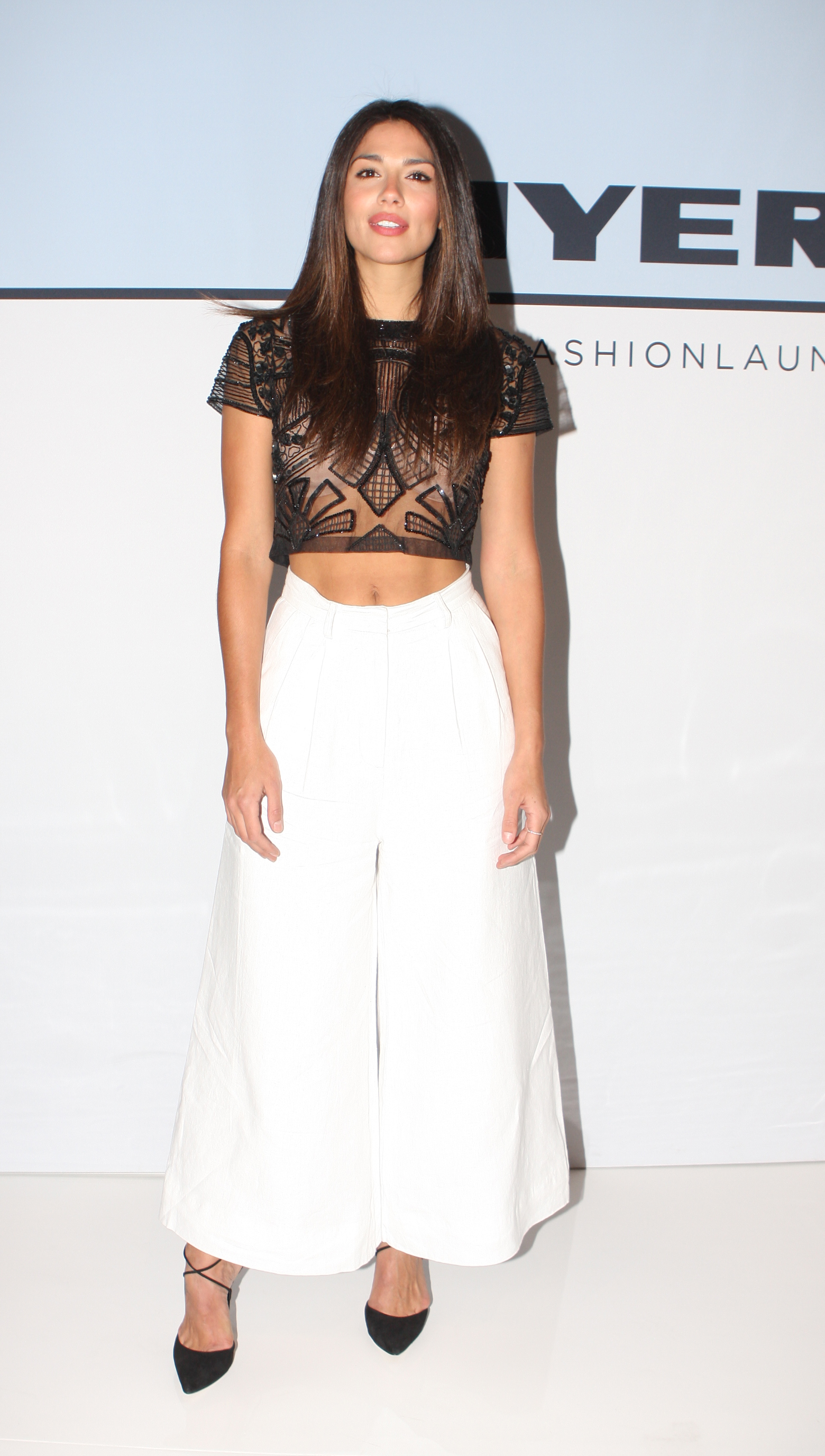
- Whitesell in 2015
- Born: Pia Loyola Blanco; 2 November 1983 (age 43); Viña del Mar, Chile
- Other name: Pia Miller
- Citizenship: Chile; Australia
- Occupations: Model, actress, television presenter
- Years active: 1998–present (modelling); 2010–present (acting)
- Spouses: Brad Miller (m. 2007; div. 2016) Patrick Whitesell (m. 2021)
- Children: 2
- Modelling information
- Height: 5 ft 9 in (1.75 m)
- Hair colour: Brown
- Eye colour: Brown
- Agency: Chadwick Models

Pia Whitesell (Piya Loyola Blanco; born 2 November 1983) is an Australian model, actress and television presenter. Whitesell came to prominence after winning Dolly's annual modelling competition. She later competed in the second series of Search for a Supermodel. Whitesell has appeared in various advertising campaigns for brands such as Myer and Mossimo. She became the co-host of Qantas' in-flight entertainment programs in 2010 and was named the first Australian celebrity tourism ambassador for Chile in 2014.

After taking acting lessons and presentation classes at the National Institute of Dramatic Art in 2009, Whitesell became a presenter on the travel show Postcards Victoria and made guest appearances in several television shows, including East West 101 and Neighbours. From 2015 until 2018, Whitesell portrayed Kat Chapman in the Australian soap opera Home and Away. She received a nomination for the Logie Award for Best New Talent. After leaving Home and Away, Whitesell starred in Nine Network's Bite Club.

== Early life ==
Pia Loyola Blanco was born on 2 November 1983 in Viña del Mar, to Angélica Blanco. She left Chile for Australia when she was four years old, along with her mother, brother and sister. Her grandmother later joined the family. When she was seven, Whitesell’s mother enrolled her in a modelling school.

== Career ==
=== Modelling ===
In 1998, when she was fourteen, Whitesell won a modelling competition run by teen magazine Dolly and was given a contract with Chadwick Models. By the time she was sixteen, Whitesell had travelled around the world for catwalk shows. She finished secondary school by correspondence. Whitesell appeared on the second series of Search for a Supermodel in 2001. After Search for a Supermodel, Whitesell secured a contract with L'Oréal to appear in a 2003 campaign. Whitesell has featured in advertising campaigns for Myer, Mossimo, Midas, Australian Unity, Crown Casino and Jump. She has also been cast in various television commercials and endorsed brands such as Samsung and Cadbury.

In 2009, Whitesell's image was featured on a T-shirt by designer Nick Bowes for the fashion label KRMA. Actors Adrian Grenier and John Stamos were later spotted wearing the T-shirt. Both Whitesell and Bowes was surprised by the attention it got, saying "When he asked if he could use the headshot, I thought nothing of it. The success of the T-shirt has caught both of us by surprise. I am really flattered and humbled by it." The following year, Whitesell was named the official ambassador for the 2010 Australian Grand Prix.

In July, Whitesell replaced Deborah Hutton as the co-host of Qantas' in-flight entertainment programs. She became the face of Megan Gale's swimwear line for Summer 2012/2013. In 2014, Whitesell became the first Australian celebrity tourism ambassador for Chile. She also became a brand ambassador for the Mazda CX-5 in January 2015. Later that year, Whitesell starred in a video for Maybelline promoting their new mascara and eyeliner products. In 2017, Whitesell became the first Australian ambassador for the Gillette Venus brand. The following year, she was named as the official ambassador for Melbourne Fashion Week. She also modelled for Caltrate vitamins.

=== Acting and presenting ===
In 2009, Whitesell began taking acting lessons, and attended voice and presentation classes at the National Institute of Dramatic Art (NIDA). The following year, she became a presenter on Nine Network's travel show Postcards Victoria. She left the show in 2012. Whitesell made several appearances on the Network Ten talk show The Circle discussing red carpet fashions. In 2011, Whitesell appeared in the romantic comedy film Big Mamma's Boy and television crime drama East West 101. The following year, she was cast in Conspiracy 365 and guest starred as Monica Wetherby in an episode of Neighbours. Whitesell made a guest appearance in Wonderland in 2013.

In August 2014, Whitesell joined the cast of Home and Away in the regular role of Katarina "Kat" Chapman. Whitesell began shooting her first scenes two weeks after her audition. She initially commuted to and from Sydney for filming. Kat was introduced as Summer Bay's new policewoman. Whitesell said she was proud to play a strong character and added "I saw the character breakdown and what excited me the most about this character was that she isn't, in any way, sexualised." Whitesell made her first screen appearance as Kat on 5 February 2015. She earned a nomination for Best New Talent at the 2016 Logie Awards. News outlets published photos in August 2017 of the cast filming Kat's funeral. Whitesell confirmed her departure from the show in October 2017. Her final scenes aired during the 2017 season finale broadcast on 18 December.

In 2018, Whitesell was cast in the eight-part crime thriller Bite Club on Nine Network. She plays Kate Summers, a former nurse and best friend of Detective Senior Constable Zoe Rawlings (Ash Ricardo), a shark-attack survivor hunting a serial killer. The series also stars Todd Lasance and Dominic Monaghan. In 2019, Whitesell co-starred in the Dora and the Lost City of Gold, the live action film adaptation of Dora the Explorer, as Dora's aunt Mami.

== Personal life ==
Whitesell gave birth to her first son, Izzy, when she was nineteen. In 2005, she began a relationship with AFL footballer Brad Miller. She gave birth to their son in October 2006, and they married in 2007. In 2010, Whitesell became an Australian citizen. In October 2015, the couple announced their separation. From November 2017 to April 2019, she was engaged to film producer Tyson Mullane. Pia announced her engagement to businessman Patrick Whitesell in early November 2020, and the couple married in May 2021.

== Filmography ==
Year	Title	Role	Notes
2011	East West 101	Ximena	
2011	Big Mamma's Boy	Maria	
2011	Project Runway Australia	Herself/guest judge	
2012	Conspiracy 365	Belinda Scott	Episode: "February"
2012	Neighbours	Monica Wetherby	Season 28 (Episode: "6535")
2013	Wonderland	Attractive Woman	Episode: "Motherhood"
2015–2018	Home and Away	Katarina Chapman	Seasons 28–31; Nominated – Logie Award for Best New Talent
2018	Bite Club	Kate Summers	
2019	Dora and the Lost City of Gold	Sabrina	
