= Digital mailroom =

Automation of incoming mail processes

Digital mailroom is the automation of incoming mail processes. Using document scanning and document capture technologies, companies can digitise incoming mail and automate the classification and distribution of mail within the organization. Both paper and electronic mail (email) can be managed through the same process allowing companies to standardize their internal mail distribution procedures and adhere to company compliance policies.

Many companies still believe that they are legally bound to archive some documents as paper for a certain time, such as accounting documents or contracts. According to a recent survey by AIIM, legal admissibility of scanned documents is still seen as an issue in over a quarter of businesses. However, the reality is that these rules only apply to a small minority of documents. Most digitized documents are now legally admissible in a court of law. The new British Standard, BS 10008 "Evidential weight and legal admissibility of electronic information" covers this in detail. The culture of 'avoiding risk at all cost' is what compels companies to print and archive thousands of documents every day.

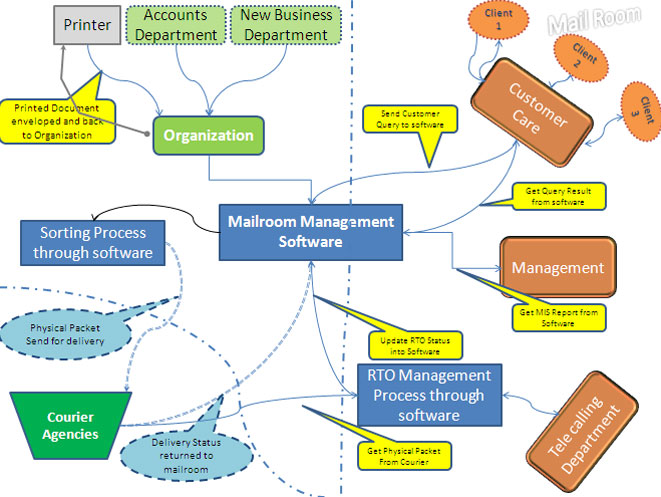
Digital Mailroom

== Reasons for implementation ==
Mail volumes continue to grow exponentially, stimulated by business growth and mobile workforces. For example, medium-sized companies now process 100,000 pieces of mail a month and service over 200 departments. In addition, the corporate mailroom, a vital link in the corporate information system, is struggling to keep abreast of this paper flow. Meanwhile, today's organisations demand instant, accurate information; US businesses spend over $500 billion annually turning the information on the documents they receive every day into useful data that they can use to run their business.

The need for corporate compliance and accountability has also forced large corporations to invest heavily in information backup, storage systems, and compliance solutions. Some corporate mailrooms have benefited from the development of high-speed automation equipment designed for moving physical mail more efficiently through the system. However, the challenges are daunting, considering that most mailrooms are using one-piece-at-a-time visual identification and manual sorting methods.

By digitizing the incoming mail process, and indexing the documents on the fly, companies can not only gain control of their mail processes internally (no more efficiency losses, gaps in document control and loss of valuable mail), but will have the opportunity to combine electronic mail formats (e-mail, fax) in the same document processing flow. A digital mailroom designed as a central platform for information allows an organization to bring rationality to mail processing and significant gains in productivity and customer service.

== Benefits ==
=== Reducing the decision cycle ===
One major benefit of turning all incoming paper mail into images as soon as it is received is the extent to which it shortens the decision cycle. Employees can access images more quickly, regardless of where the documents were physically acquired. Files can then be processed very rapidly according to their level of urgency. Just as digital mailrooms facilitate the exchange of company information, they also facilitate the coordination of several people around the same document. The decision-making process becomes quicker and more accurate.

=== Rationalising the circulation of information ===
The various technologies at the heart of digital mailrooms help companies rationalise their processes, e.g. it allows companies to reduce costs associated with resending documents between sites.

=== Reducing paper costs ===
Mailroom costs not only include staff costs involved in the distribution of letters, but also the costs associated with the resending, loss or deterioration of documents. A digital mailroom implementation has a direct effect on all those costs and becomes a key element of competitiveness for the company. Another source of paper costs is the one associated with the physical storage of documents. Encouraging employees "to do without paper" will quickly lead to the reduction in the cost of excessive printing and copying of documents. The aim is obviously not to ban the paper from the work environment but rather to set up a new coherent and secure organisation that makes the use of paper superfluous.

=== Ensuring data tracking ===
Ensuring incoming mail tracking has become a necessity for the majority of companies, with compliance regulation being a major factor. The earlier a document is transformed into an image file, the more reliably it can be tracked throughout its life cycle. Furthermore, a scanned document becomes accessible by all authorised users (as a PDF, TIFF or JPEG file). The file created includes more than simply images; it references one or more documents in the archive database and records all the actions carried out by the people responsible for the file. The security of the process guarantees the authenticity and integrity of the document, which aligns with the records management policy of the company.

=== Improving customer service ===
The electronic management of incoming mail improves the handling of documents within service oriented companies and agencies. It enhances the quality of the service offered to customers by allowing staff to instantly access customer files and answer questions immediately. The improvement of customer service is considered to be of fundamental importance by the majority of companies.

=== Reduce dependency on physical office locations ===
Digitizing mail upon its entry into an organization coupled with content management systems allows mail to be routed to appropriate staff members regardless of their physical location. The growing trend of remote work has lessened the overall need for real estate for the company mailroom. Many companies are now opting for mailroom software to automate their entire inbound and outbound mail operations.

== Technologies ==
=== Document capture ===
"Document capture" is the act of scanning paper documents so they can be archived and retrieved in their original image format. It is the most widespread imaging technology used by companies today. Software improvements now make it possible to capture paper documents while importing electronic files and to process them together through the same production platform. Both incoming paper and electronic mail can now be archived together at the same storage location. Another major change is the ability to scan documents from remote locations and to retrieve them through a web interface. This is known as distributed capture and provides many cost benefits to companies with multiple branch offices or remotely located staff.

=== Data capture ===
Originally, forms processing technologies were only able to extract and validate data from structured documents such as administrative forms. The improvements in OCR technology now make it possible to automatically extract all data from semi-structured documents (e.g. Invoices) – the technical acronym for this is Intelligent Document Capture (IDC). For fully unstructured documents (e.g. legal contracts, customer correspondence, and white mail), it is not yet possible to locate and extract all information. However, technologies have improved enough to identify the document type and automatically extract key information that can be used to index the document and/or route the document to the right department or recipient.

=== Document classification ===
Software using a graphical approach can analyze and classify mixed batches of structured or semi-structured documents in order to build a library of templates. Using this auto-generated library of templates, the software can then identify and extract data from any scanned document in a single flow. This image-based classification approach, combined with a full-text analysis of certain documents (based on a keyword search), are the main technologies used today to process semi- or unstructured documents. These innovative automatic classification technologies reduce the need for pre-sorting documents before the scanning process. As a result, companies receiving high volumes of paper mail can make significant cost reductions every year.

=== Workflow ===
Workflow applications enable electronic documents and information to circulate inside the company. They might have to manage very complex processes related to multiple locations due to the globalization of companies. The increasing importance of security is another vital challenge. One of the key developments in workflow technologies is around making company processes and workflow processes more consistent in order to avoid organizational changes when implementing these tools. Although company organizations tend to become increasingly complex, these software solutions are becoming simpler in terms of implementation and interfaces.

=== Archiving ===
Due to the high volume of documents that need to be archived by organizations today, it is critical that the documents can be stored rapidly, securely managed and quickly retrieved through a common user interface. Documents can usually be archived on a variety of electronic storage media and easily retrieved through a Web interface (thin client). There are many archiving solutions on the market today, some as a component of an ECM or document management solution and some as a stand-alone system specifically designed for the purpose of high volume, high speed archiving.

=== Document and content management ===
A document can be an image, a file stored and compressed in a tiff, gif or jpg electronic exchange format, or an MS Office file or a PDF file (Acrobat exchange format). Content generally includes all the above combined with any data/information as well as other electronic files such as e-mails and web pages. Content Management solutions need back-end repositories or databases (e.g. Oracle or MS SQL Server) to store the files and retrieval data. During the last decade, these software solutions have benefited from the universal XML standard used to index, store and access files to and from any repository. Relative to the other systems, content management systems manage more complex administrative, access and workflow rules in relation to the number of files and file formats it needs to support.

== Evolution of hardware ==
The range of hardware available to turn paper documents into digital images has increased considerably in the last 10 years. Although desktop scanners and multi-function devices (MFDs) are now very affordable and well suited to a small office or departmental scanning requirements, the need for high speed, high volume document scanners is still evident. The speed, reliability and increased functionality of these high-end scanners can save considerable time and money in the long term.

Today, it is possible to scan documents of different dimensions and formats in the same flow, scan colour documents, sort them physically and read data from them using OCR and barcode technologies during the scanning process. Processing speed has also significantly increased. This evolution, together with the existence of machines able to completely automate mail processing – opening envelopes, removing staples, scanning, sorting – play a significant role in the development of large volume paper processing such as mail processing.

The next step for companies is to rationalize their mail processing to be as consistent as possible with their organizational structure, e.g. choosing between the implementation of a centralized digital mailroom and the implementation of decentralized mail scanning facilities or a combination of the two.

== Adoption ==
According to a survey conducted by AIIM in 2009, centralized in-house scanning and mailroom scanning are set for considerable growth in take-up compared to outsourced scanning and capture. 48% of the survey respondents have a centralized, in-house scanning service, citing better indexing and closer integration with the process as the main benefits.
