= Jim Whitesell =

American college basketball coach (born 1959)

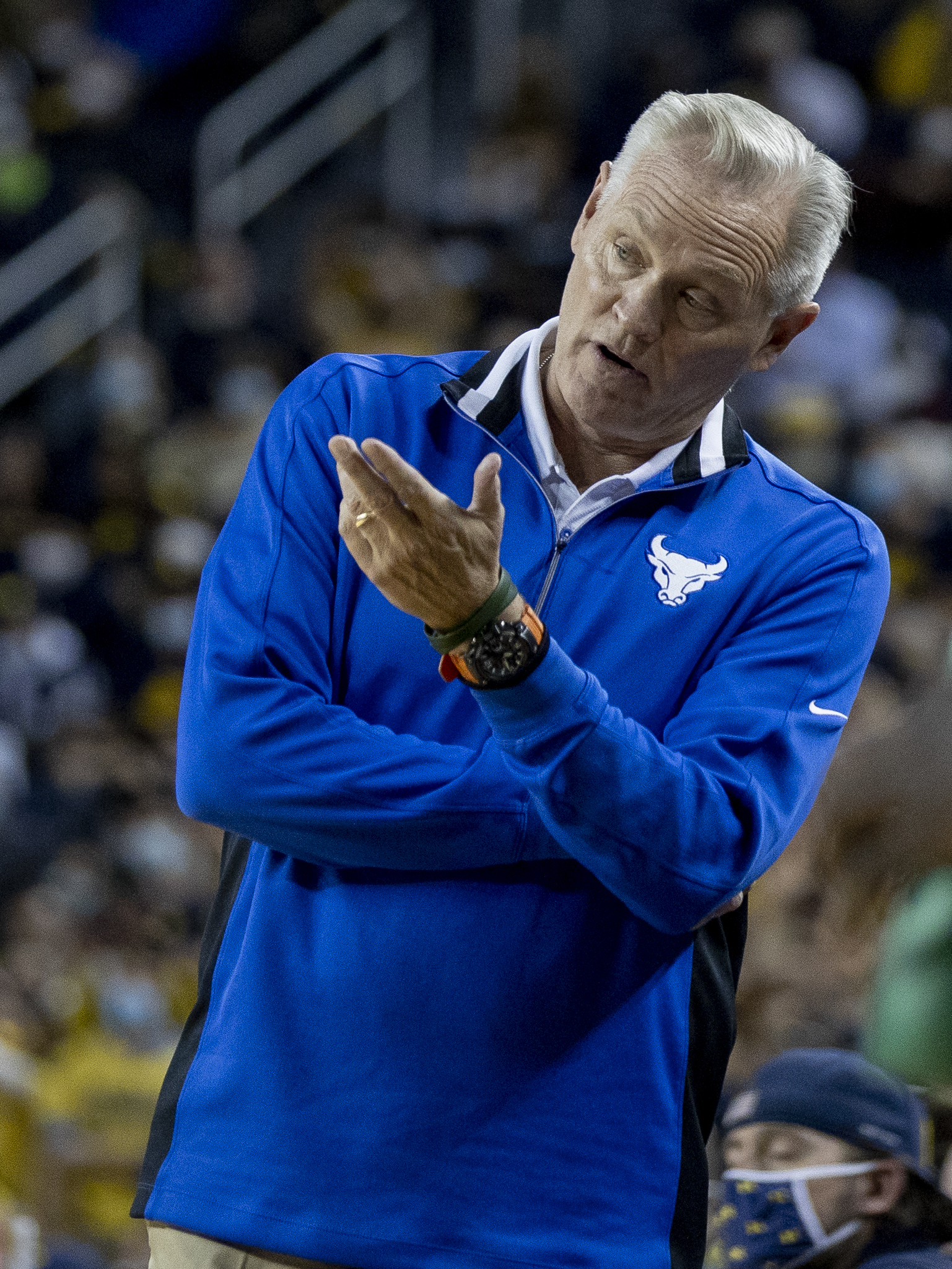
- Whitesell with Buffalo in 2021

Current position
- Title: Assistant coach
- Team: Albany
- Conference: America East

Biographical details
- Born: December 27, 1959 (age 66); Iowa Falls, Iowa, U.S.
- Education: Luther

Coaching career (HC unless noted)
- 1982–1983: North Dakota (assistant)
- 1983–1984: Ellsworth CC (assistant)
- 1984–1985: Wabash Valley (assistant)
- 1985–1987: Mankato State (assistant)
- 1987–1992: Elmhurst
- 1992–2004: Lewis
- 2004–2011: Loyola–Chicago
- 2011–2013: Saint Louis (assistant)
- 2013–2015: St. John's (assistant)
- 2015–2019: Buffalo (associate HC)
- 2019–2023: Buffalo
- 2023–present: Albany (assistant)

Head coaching record
- Overall: 445–357 (.555)

James Whitesell (born December 27, 1959) is an American college basketball coach who is an assistant coach for the Albany Great Danes men's basketball team. Prior to Albany, he was the head men's coach for the Buffalo Bulls. Previously he coached at the Division I level as a head coach at Loyola University Chicago and an assistant at St. John's and Saint Louis. Whitesell replaced Larry Farmer as head coach of the Ramblers on April 14, 2004. Whitesell was fired as head coach of the Ramblers on March 14, 2011, after seven seasons, posting a 109–106 record in that time. Whitesell was hired in August 2013 as an assistant coach at St. John's to fill the void left by former director of basketball operations Moe Hicks. On April 16, 2015, he was named associate head coach of men's basketball at the University at Buffalo. On April 6, 2019, Whitesell was named the 14th head coach of men's basketball at the University at Buffalo, filling the void left by Nate Oats when he resigned to take the head coach position at the University of Alabama. On March 11, 2023, after four seasons and a 70–49 record he was fired as the Buffalo head coach. He was named an assistant coach at Albany on September 14, 2023.

Several of Whitesell's brothers work in the entertainment industry, including director John Whitesell, writer Chris Whitesell, writer/actor Sean Whitesell, and agent Patrick Whitesell.

== Head coaching record ==
Record table
Season	Team	Overall	Conference	Standing	Postseason
Elmhurst Bluejays (College Conference of Illinois and Wisconsin) (1987–1992)
1987–88	Elmhurst	6–20	3–13	9th	
1988–89	Elmhurst	12–14	6–10	T–6th	
1989–90	Elmhurst	15–11	8–8	5th	
1990–91	Elmhurst	12–14	6–10	6th	
1991–92	Elmhurst	19–9	11–5	T–2nd	NCAA Division III Second Round
Elmhurst:		64–68 (.485)	34–46 (.425)		
Lewis Flyers (Great Lakes Valley Conference) (1992–2004)
1992–93	Lewis	6–21			
1993–94	Lewis	18–9			
1994–95	Lewis	14–13			
1995–96	Lewis	18–9			
1996–97	Lewis	16–11			
1997–98	Lewis	19–9			NCAA Division II First Round
1998–99	Lewis	21–8			NCAA Division II First Round
1999–00	Lewis	19–8			
2000–01	Lewis	11–16			
2001–02	Lewis	11–16			
2002–03	Lewis	25–7			NCAA Division II First Round
2003–04	Lewis	24–7			NCAA Division II First Round
Lewis:		202–134 (.601)			
Loyola Ramblers (Horizon League) (2004–2011)
2004–05	Loyola–Chicago	13–17	8–8	T–4th	
2005–06	Loyola–Chicago	19–11	8–8	T–3rd	
2006–07	Loyola–Chicago	21–11	10–6	3rd	
2007–08	Loyola–Chicago	12–18	6–12	7th	
2008–09	Loyola–Chicago	14–18	6–12	8th	
2009–10	Loyola–Chicago	14–16	5–13	8th	
2010–11	Loyola–Chicago	16–15	7–11	8th	
Loyola–Chicago:		109–106 (.507)	50–70 (.417)		
Buffalo Bulls (Mid-American Conference) (2019–2023)
2019–20	Buffalo	20–12	11–7	3rd (East)	
2020–21	Buffalo	16–9	12–5	2nd	NIT First Round
2021–22	Buffalo	19–11	13–6	5th	
2022–23	Buffalo	15–17	9–9	T–6th	
Buffalo:		70–49 (.588)	45–27 (.625)		
Total:		445–357 (.555)			
National champion Postseason invitational champion Conference regular season champion Conference regular season and conference tournament champion Division regular season champion Division regular season and conference tournament champion Conference tournament champion
