= Norman Brokaw =

American talent agent

- Born: Norman Robert Brokaw; April 21, 1927; New York City, U.S.
- Died: October 29, 2016 (aged 89); Beverly Hills, California, U.S.
- Occupation: Talent agent
- Employer: William Morris Agency
- Title: CEO of William Morris Agency
- Board member of: Helped start St. Jude, The Betty Ford Clinic, and Life Trustee of Cedars Sinai Hospital.
- Spouse: Marguerite Longley Brokaw
- Children: 6
- Relatives: Johnny Hyde (maternal uncle)

Norman Robert Brokaw (April 21, 1927 – October 29, 2016) was an American talent agent. He served as the president, chief executive officer, and chairman of the William Morris Agency. He represented Marilyn Monroe, Donna Summer, Bill Cosby, Mark Spitz, Warren Beatty, Clint Eastwood, and many more.

== Early life ==
Norman Brokaw was born in 1927 in New York City, the son of Maria Hyde (née Haidabura) and Isidore Brokaw. His parents were Ukrainian Jewish immigrants from Poltava and Odesa, respectively. His mother performed with her father, Nicholas; her brother Victor, and sister Nettie, in the Haidabura Family Russian Peasant Quartette, which was "the first Russian acrobatic dance troupe to appear on the American vaudeville stage". Another uncle, Johnny Hyde, was the vice president of the William Morris Agency.

Brokaw relocated to Los Angeles when he was a teenager.

== Career ==
Brokaw delivered mail for the William Morris Agency in 1943, at the age of 15. By the 1950s, he encouraged William Morris to get into the television business. He helped create such series as Racket Squad and The Public Defender by moving 1950s film stars to television. Brokaw would go on to represent producers of Gomer Pyle, U.S.M.C., The Dick Van Dyke Show, and The Andy Griffith Show.

Brokaw was appointed as the president and CEO of the William Morris Agency in 1989. He became its CEO and chairman in 1991.

== Philanthropy ==
Brokaw was the co-founder of the Betty Ford Cancer Center. He also served as its president. Additionally, he served on the boards of trustees of the Cedars-Sinai Medical Center and the St. Jude Children's Research Hospital.

== Personal life and death ==
Brokaw married three times. He had six children: David Brokaw, Sanford Brokaw and Joel Brokaw with his first wife; Barbara Brokaw and Wendy Brokaw Kretchmer with his second wife; and Lauren Brokaw with his third wife, Marguerite Longley.

Brokaw died on October 29, 2016, in Beverly Hills, California. He was 89.
