= Patrick Whitesell =

American businessman (born 1965) and former executive chairman of Endeavor

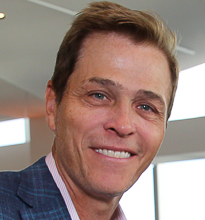
- Whitesell in 2016
- Born: February 4, 1965 (age 61); Iowa Falls, Iowa, U.S.
- Education: Luther College
- Occupation: CEO Businessman
- Spouses: Lauren Sánchez (m. 2005; div. 2019) Pia Miller (m. 2021)
- Children: 2
- Family: John Whitesell (brother); Chris Whitesell (brother); Sean Whitesell (brother); Jim Whitesell (brother); Maria Quiban (sister-in-law)

Patrick Whitesell (born February 4, 1965) is an American businessman who was executive chairman of Endeavor, an entertainment and media agency. He joined the Endeavor Talent Agency as a partner in February 2001, where he was a member of the company's executive committee.

== Early life ==
Whitesell was born on February 4, 1965, in Iowa Falls, Iowa. He is the son of Patricia and John Patrick "Jack" Whitesell. His brothers include the late film and television actor Sean Whitesell, Thomas Whitesell, writer Christopher Whitesell, college basketball coach Jim Whitesell, and director John Whitesell. Whitesell graduated from Iowa Falls High School in 1983. He graduated from Luther College in Iowa in 1987.

== Career ==
Whitesell worked at InterTalent from 1990 to 1992. He was an agent at United Talent Agency (UTA), from 1992 to 1995. Whitesell served as head of the talent department of Creative Artists Agency (CAA), from 1995 to 2001.

Whitesell and WME co-CEO Ari Emanuel have been characterized as "rewriting the Hollywood script," and they have been named to Fortune's Businessperson of the Year list.

Whitesell is an appointed member of the Governor's California Film Commission and an associate member of the Academy of Motion Picture Arts & Sciences.

Endeavor went public in 2021 with Whitesell owning a stake worth around $480 million according to Bloomberg.

He and Ari Emanuel are also co-CEO of IMG, a global sports, events and talent management company headquartered in New York City.

After Endeavor was sold to private equity firm Silver Lake in 2025, Whitesell relinquished his positions of executive chairman in the Endeavor and IMG and left both companies.

== Personal life ==
Whitesell resides in Beverly Hills, California. He is divorced from Lauren Sanchez, and has two children. On November 28, 2020, he became engaged to Australian-Chilean actress Pia (née Loyola) Miller. In May 2021, it was reported that they had married.
