= Endeavor Talent Agency =

Defunct American talent agency

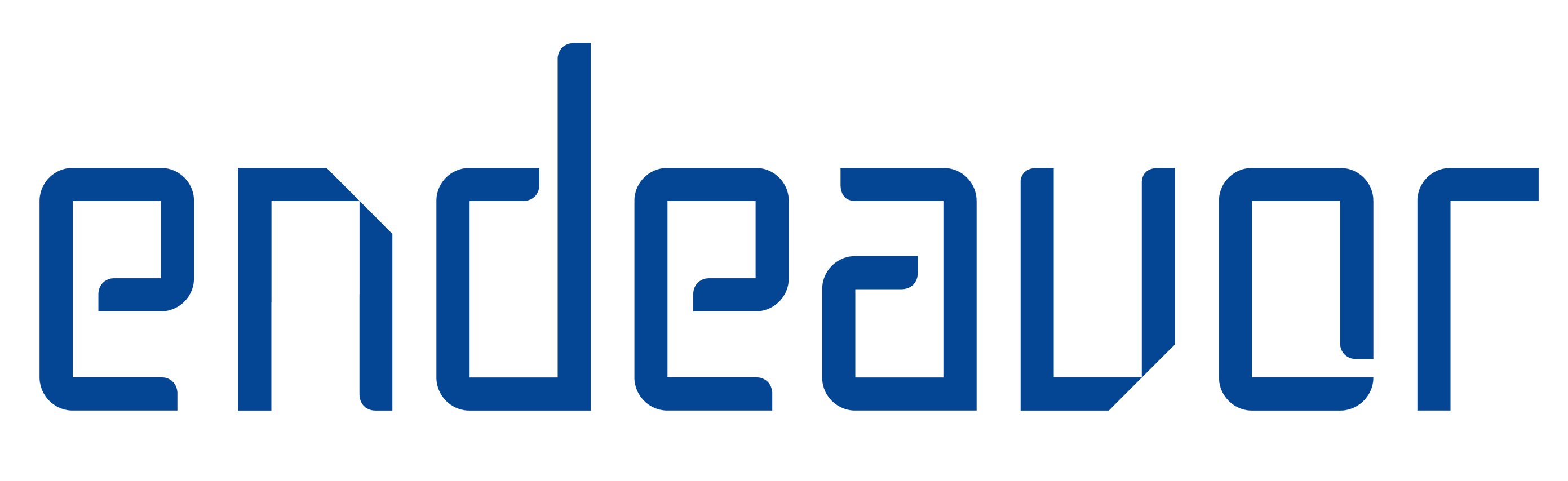
- Industry: Talent and Literary Agencies
- Founded: 1995; 31 years ago in Beverly Hills, California, United States
- Defunct: July 2009; 17 years ago
- Fate: Corporate merger
- Successor: William Morris Endeavor
- Headquarters: Beverly Hills, California, United States
- Key people: Ari Emanuel; Patrick Whitesell; Rick Rosen; Tom Strickler; David Greenblatt
- Website: www.wmeentertainment.com

The Endeavor Talent Agency was an American talent agency founded by Ari Emanuel, Rick Rosen, Tom Strickler, and David Greenblatt. It was launched in March 1995 and went on to represent a wide variety of acclaimed film and television stars. In April 2009, Emanuel and Endeavor executive Patrick Whitesell orchestrated a merger with the William Morris Agency, resulting in William Morris Endeavor. William Morris Endeavor was renamed Endeavor in October 2017.

== History ==
=== Formation ===
The roots of Endeavor can be traced to ICM Partners, where founders Emanuel, Rosen, Strickler, and Greenblatt were all top television agents. Emanuel was motivated to start his own company after starting a year and a half in recovery after being hit by a flatbed truck. In early 1995, they formed a plan to start their own agency, which was ultimately discovered by ICM Chairman Jeff Berg.

On March 29, the four agents were fired from ICM and immediately formed Endeavor. The agency began operations on March 30, working mainly with television clients from an office above the former Islands Restaurant in South Beverly Hills. Co-founder Ari Emanuel and the Endeavor Agency were the basis for the character Ari Gold, and his Miller Gold Agency, on HBO's Entourage.

=== 1996–2003: Expansion / Whitesell joins ===
In 1996, Endeavor moved to a new high-rise building at 9601 Wilshire Boulevard in Beverly Hills. Three new partners from CAA quickly joined the company: David Lonner, Doug Robinson, and Adam Venit. Lonner's clientele included the feature directors that Endeavor needed to solidify its standing as a full service agency. Robinson and Venit were the first actors' agents and had a client list that included Hank Azaria, Adam Sandler, and David Spade (all of whom are now represented by WME).

The Endeavor talent department grew dramatically during the next eight years, mainly with the 2001 addition of former CAA talent head, Patrick Whitesell. Whitesell led the development of the agency's list of feature film headliners, with a talent pool that included Ben Affleck, Christian Bale, Matt Damon, Hugh Jackman, and Jude Law. The group also signed several comedy stars during that period, including Sacha Baron Cohen, Kevin James, and Charlie Sheen.

=== 2003–2009: Continued growth ===
By 2003, Endeavor had become one of the industry's fastest-growing talent agencies. In June of that year, they relocated to 9601 Wilshire Boulevard in Beverly Hills, which is now the current headquarters of WME. The Wilshire office was designed by UCLA professor and architect Neil Denari with wall graphics by 2x4 of New York City. For this project, NMDA Inc., the company of Neil Denari, and associate architect Interior Architects received the 2007 Institute Honor Award for Interior Architecture from the American Institute of Architects (AIA).

In 2006, agent Nancy Josephson left ICM after the company went through an ownership change. Endeavor quickly brought in Josephson and her clients – Friends creators Marta Kauffman and David Crane, Craig Ferguson, Tyra Banks, and director David Frankel. Soon after, ICM agents Matt Solo and Robert Newman joined as well. Solo's roster included The Shield creator Shawn Ryan, while Newman's brought esteemed film directors Guillermo del Toro, Baz Luhrmann, Danny Boyle and Robert Rodriguez.

2008 brought four key additions from UTA, including talent agents Sharon Jackson and Nick Stevens. Their clients, Will Arnett, Jack Black, Jonah Hill, Amy Poehler, and Ben Stiller, bolstered the agency's comedy department.

=== 2009–present ===
In 2008, Emanuel and Whitesell began preliminary discussions with the William Morris Agency about a company merger. By April 2009, the announcement was made and William Morris Endeavor was formed. WMA relocated to Endeavor's Beverly Hills office and Emanuel and Whitesell retained the titles of Co-CEOs. Their successful partnership led Fortune to name Emanuel and Whitesell on their 2010 "Businessperson of the Year" list.

Following the disappearance of Washington Post journalist Jamal Khashoggi on 2 October 2018, and reports that a Saudi hit squad had assassinated him, Endeavor vowed to sever its ties with Saudi Arabia. Emanuel reportedly called White House senior adviser and Trump son-in-law Jared Kushner to relay his frustration and discuss withdrawing the agency from a $400 million financial deal with the regime in Saudi Arabia.
