= WME Group =

American talent agency

WME Group, LLC
- Trade name: WME Group
- Formerly: William Morris Endeavor (2009–2013); WME-IMG (2013–2017); Endeavor (2017–2026)
- Type: Private
- Traded as: NYSE: EDR (2021–2025)
- Industry: Talent and literary agencies
- Predecessors: William Morris Agency; Endeavor Talent Agency
- Founded: 2009; 17 years ago in Beverly Hills, California, United States
- Headquarters: Beverly Hills, California, United States
- Key people: Ari Emanuel Executive chairman
- Revenue: ▲US$7.11 billion (2024)
- Operating income: ▼US$−153 million (2024)
- Net income: ▼US$−782 million (2024)
- Total assets: ▼US$20.6 billion (2024)
- Total equity: ▼US$9.85 billion (2024)
- Number of employees: c. 10,000 (2024)
- Parent: Silver Lake
- Subsidiaries: Endeavor Streaming; TKO Group Holdings (61.72%); Pantheon Media Group; Fifth Season (15%)
- Website: wmegrp.com

WME Group, LLC (d.b.a. WME Group), formerly known as William Morris Endeavor, WME-IMG, and Endeavor, is an American holding company for talent and media agencies with its primary offices in Beverly Hills, California. The company was founded in April 2009 after the merger of the William Morris Agency and Endeavor Talent Agency. The WME Group represents artists in film, television, music, theater, digital media, and publishing. It also represents the NFL and NHL. The WME Group is the majority owner of World Wrestling Entertainment (WWE) and the Ultimate Fighting Championship (UFC) through TKO Group. In collegiate athletics Endeavor-Learfield IMG represents The American, A10, Big 12, Conference USA, Horizon League, MAC, MEAC, OVC, SEC and WCC.

The group additionally owns a 20% stake in film and television production company Fifth Season (formerly Endeavor Content), with 55% owned by South Korean entertainment and retail company CJ ENM., and the remaining 25% owned by Japanese film production, distribution, and theatrical exhibition company Toho. As of 2026, the WME Group is headed by executive chairman Ari Emanuel.

On March 24, 2025, private equity firm Silver Lake completed a deal to take Endeavor private. Then executive chairman Patrick Whitesell relinquished his position and left the company in the aftermath of the deal. In 2026, Endeavor was rebranded as "WME Group".

== History ==
=== Beginnings ===
The Endeavor Talent Agency launched in 1995. By 2009, it was one of the fastest-growing Hollywood talent agencies, with The New York Times singling out its reputation for "quick thinking, ferocity and barely bridled ambition".

=== William Morris Endeavor ===
On April 27, 2009, William Morris Agency (WMA) and the Endeavor Talent Agency announced that they were forming William Morris Endeavor, or "WME". Endeavor executives Ari Emanuel and Patrick Whitesell were widely seen as the architects of the merger and quickly became the Co-CEOs of WME. After the official announcement of the merger, nearly 100 WMA employees and former board members were let go. One of those leaving was Jim Wiatt, who came to WMA in 1999 from International Creative Management, where he was vice-chairman. He had joined WMA as president and co-chief executive officers, and had risen to board chairman. After the merger, WME moved its headquarters into the offices of Endeavor at 9601 Wilshire Boulevard in the heart of Beverly Hills.

In 2011, Emanuel was quoted in a Financial Times profile about the company saying, "We built a culture where people are rewarded for taking risks." Emanuel and Whitesell implemented several leadership strategies to boost the productivity of their agents, most notably, the "Farmhouse" training program.

In September 2022, Richard Weitz and Christian Muirhead were named co-chairmen of the agency.

=== Expansion ===
Endeavor grew to include several subsidiary companies and expanded divisions. Fortune named co-CEOs Ari Emanuel and Patrick Whitesell in their 2010 "Businessperson of the Year" list, acknowledging their corporate growth strategies. Emanuel had previously been recognized as a 21st-century "super agent" by both The Wall Street Journal and The Guardian, as well as an Advertising Age "Influencer." In July 2011, the company and its foundation created Camp Summer Eagle, which provides donations and activities for schoolchildren at Foster Elementary in Compton, California.

Shortly after the merger, WME helped launch the investment group Raine, which aligned the company with properties like Vice Media and Zumba Fitness. In 2010, WME partnered with RED Interactive, a digital advertising agency. Two years later, they formed an alliance with the social media management firm TheAudience, partnering with digital entrepreneur Sean Parker and executing social campaigns for properties like the Seth MacFarlane motion picture Ted and the Coachella Music Festival. 2013 brought a strategic partnership between WME and creative music agency Jingle Punks, which creates, publishes and licenses music. WME is also an investor in the e-commerce platform [OpenSky], which was named one of America's "Most Promising Companies" by Forbes. In 2013, Whitesell and Emanuel were profiled in Fast Company, highlighting the company's digital growth.

On May 2, 2012, WME and Silver Lake Partners, a technology-focused private equity firm based in Silicon Valley, signed an agreement for Silver Lake to acquire a 31.25% minority stake in the agency for $250 million. A new executive committee, consisting of Co-CEOs Ari Emanuel and Patrick Whitesell and Silver Lake Managing Director Egon Durban, was formed to lead the company's growth strategy and investment activities. In July 2013, WME acquired a minority stake in the creative agency Droga5. The partnership combines the companies’ advertising and entertainment resources.

=== WME-IMG ===
On December 18, 2013, WME and Silver Lake announced the acquisition of IMG for $2.4 billion. WME's Ari Emanuel and Patrick Whitesell took over as co-CEOs. On January 21, 2015, it was announced that WME had acquired Global eSports Management (GEM), an international agency representing various esports and professional video game players and personalities. In April 2015, they bought the Professional Bull Riders (PBR). On September 23, 2015, it was announced that WME-IMG would be partnering with Turner Broadcasting to create a televised esports league, the ELeague.

On September 14, 2015, WME-IMG acquired from Donald Trump the Miss Universe Organization, which produces the Miss Universe, Miss USA and Miss Teen USA beauty pageants and related content. The organization sells television rights to the pageants in other countries. Financial details were not disclosed. Softbank and Fidelity Investments in early 2016 invested in WME-IMG. The company formed a joint venture in June 2016 for China with Sequoia Capital, Tencent and FountainVest Partners.

On July 9, 2016, Zuffa, LLC, the parent company of Ultimate Fighting Championship, was sold to a group led by WME-IMG, its owner Silver Lake Partners, Kohlberg Kravis Roberts, and MSD Capital, for $4.025 billion, the largest-ever acquisition in the sports industry. On August 22, 2016, WME acquired the literary agency Rabineau Wachter Sanford & Gillett (RWSG); its co-founders, Sylvie Rabineau and Jill Holwager Gillett, head a division of WME involved in the coordination of screen adaptations of literature. WME/IMG purchased in August 2017 a majority stake in Bloom, a film finance and sales company led by Ken Kao and Alex Walton.

=== Endeavor ===
WME-IMG reorganized in October 2017 with the parent company being renamed from WME-IMG to Endeavor. Ari Emanuel became Endeavor CEO and Patrick Whitesell became Endeavor executive chairman. The general talent agency retained the WME name as the sports agency retained the IMG name. In October 2017, Endeavor Content was formed from the WME's and IMG's film financing and scripted TV sales units, WME's advisory group for film financiers and content producers and Bloom, which will continue to operate autonomously. Graham Taylor and Chris Rice were appointed as co-presidents and additional hires were Negeen Yazdi as senior vice president of film and Joe Hipps as senior vice president of television.

On November 15, 2017, actor Terry Crews said on Good Morning America that Adam Venit, head of WME's motion picture department, had squeezed Crews' genitals with his hand at an industry party in February 2016. WME responded they had suspended Venit following an internal investigation, on November 27, 2017, it was announced Venit would return to work after a month's unpaid leave. On December 4, 2017, lawyers acting on behalf of Terry Crews filed suit against WME and Venit stating "It is now time to hold Venit accountable for his sexual predatory behavior and to hold WME accountable for its conduct in condoning, ratifying, and encouraging Venit's sexual predatory behavior".

Endeavor acquired 160over90, a branding and marketing agency in Philadelphia for about $200 million in January 2018. The CEO of 160over90, John Campanella, said that Endeavor took less than two months to complete the purchase.

Third Coast Content, a faith and family audiences production and publishing company, was founded in February 2018 by veteran film executive Ben Howard as CEO with Endeavor Content as an investor and as its provider of sales and advisory services. In April 2019, Droga5 was acquired by Accenture.

==== Initial public offering ====
On May 24, 2019, Endeavor filed forms for an initial public offering (IPO) with the Securities and Exchange Commission (SEC) that would have valued the company at $7.6 billion. The form detailed Endeavor's revenue was $3.61 billion in 2018 with a net income of $100.1 million after adjustments, and potential risks involved of being potentially sued “over alleged long-term neurocognitive impairment arising from concussions”, "collective bargaining to unionize the MMA athletes", and "five related class-action lawsuits filed against it alleging that UFC violated Section 2 of the Sherman Antitrust Act of 1890 by monopolizing the alleged market for elite professional MMA athletes' services". Also included in the filing was the statement that subsidiary WME Dragon Holdings LLC, which bought 49 percent of advertising agency Droga5 in 2013, agreed to sell its interest in Droga5 to Accenture Interactive for $233 million.

On September 26, 2019, a day before it planned to go public, Endeavor Group announced that the IPO had been postponed in order to "evaluate the timing for the proposed offering as market conditions develop." Contributing factors were reported to be the under-performance of the recent IPO for Peloton, and an ongoing lawsuit with several former UFC fighters.

On March 30, 2021, Endeavor Group announced a new planned IPO for later in 2021, with Elon Musk and Fawn Weaver nominated to join its board of directors. On April 28, 2021, Endeavor Group went public on the New York Stock Exchange. Endeavor subsequently used some of the proceeds from the IPO to buy out Zuffa's other shareholders at a value of $1.7 billion, making Zuffa a wholly owned subsidiary of Endeavor. On July 19, 2021, Ursula Burns joined the board of directors. On September 27, 2021, Endeavor announced that it would acquire OpenBet for $1.2 billion in cash and stock. In March 2022, Musk resigned from the board.

==== Divestment of Endeavor Content ====
In 2019, the Writers Guild of America (WGA) filed a lawsuit against the four major Hollywood talent agencies, including WME, Creative Artists Agency (CAA), United Talent Agency (UTA) and ICM Partners, over their usage of packaging deals (under which a talent agency offers a production utilizing its represented writers, directors, and/or actors as a "package" to prospective studios), which the WGA asserted to be an illegal conflict of interest under state and federal law.

As part of agreements which would allow them to resume representing writers, the WGA called for talent agencies to reduce their interest in co-owned production companies, as they considered talent agencies owning their own production companies to be a conflict of interest. In February 2021, Endeavor agreed to a new franchising deal with the WGA, under which it must cease the use of packaging deals, and not hold more than a 20% stake in production companies affiliated with the agency, thus necessitating that it divest at least 80% of Endeavor Content.

On June 8, 2021, Endeavor began to seek a partner for the division in compliance with the agreement, with the whole sales team returning to the company to start the process. On October 28, 2021, Endeavor started to solicit second-round bids for more than $750 million, with three equity firms and two strategic companies among those in the running. On November 19, 2021, South Korean conglomerate CJ ENM reached a deal to acquire the stake for $775 million. The acquisition primarily covers the company's scripted business, with Endeavor retaining its non-scripted, documentary, and film consulting businesses. The sale is CJ ENM's largest acquisition to-date. The $785 million purchase was completed in January 2022. In September 2022, the company was renamed Fifth Season; the name stems from Eastern medicine, which recognizes the so-called "fifth season" as a celebratory time of harvest in late summer, thus representing the company's focus on global ideas and content. On October 26, 2022, JKN Global Group acquired Miss Universe Organization (MUO) from Endeavor for $14 million.

On March 7, 2023, Endeavor acquired unscripted production company Pantheon Media Group (formerly known as Asylum Entertainment Group). On June 2, 2023, Endeavor acquired literary agency Ross Yoon Agency.

==== UFC–WWE merger ====
In January 2023, professional wrestling promotion WWE stated it was exploring a potential sale, with Endeavor being among potential suitors. Its founder Vince McMahon had stepped down as chairman and CEO in mid-2022 amidst a misconduct investigation. Endeavor Streaming had been providing backend services for WWE's streaming platform WWE Network since 2019.

On April 2, CNBC reported via sources that a deal between WWE and Endeavor was imminent and could be announced the next day. On April 3, Endeavor and WWE officially announced the deal, under which WWE will merge with UFC parent company Zuffa to form a new publicly traded company; the name of the new entity was not announced, but it was stated that it will trade under the symbol "TKO". Endeavor will hold a 51% stake in "TKO", with WWE's shareholders having a 49% stake, marking the first time that WWE has not been controlled by the McMahon family. Vince McMahon will serve as executive chairman of the new entity, Emanuel as CEO, and Mark Shapiro as president and chief operating officer. As with Endeavor's ownership of UFC, Emanuel will not take on any creative roles, with current WWE CEO Nick Khan being named president of WWE (in a similar capacity to Dana White's role in UFC). Emanuel said that the merger would "bring together two leading pureplay sports and entertainment companies" and provide "significant operating synergies", while McMahon stated that "given the incredible work that Ari and Endeavor have done to grow the UFC brand—nearly doubling its revenue over the past seven years—and the immense success we’ve already had in partnering with their team on a number of ventures, I believe that this is without a doubt the best outcome for our shareholders and other stakeholders." The deal was expected to be completed on September 12, 2023. WWE and the UFC will continue to run as separate divisions of the newly merged company as per statements made by WWE CEO Nick Khan. Hours after the sale, law firm Ademi LLP launched an investigation into the sale, looking for "possible breaches of fiduciary duty and other violations of law". WWE's stock price additionally decreased following the announcement of the sale. On May 16, it was reported that the new entity would operate under the name TKO Group Holdings. The merger was finalized on September 12, 2023.

=== Privatization, divestment of sports assets ===
The logo of the Endeavor Group, used by the company prior to their sale to Silver Lake

In April 2024, private equity firm Silver Lake announced a deal to take Endeavor private, offering $27.50 per share in cash, valuing the company at $13 billion. As part of the buyout, Endeavor began to divest some of its assets; in August 2024, Endeavor announced plans to put its sports betting businesses OpenBet and IMG Arena up for sale, and in October 2024, announced plans to divest IMG, PBR, and On Location Experiences to TKO Group in an all-stock deal valued at $3.25 billion. The deal was completed on February 28, 2025. On November 11, 2024, it was announced that OpenBet and IMG Arena would be sold to OB Global Holdings, LLC for $450 million, in a management buyout led by Emanuel. The selling of Endeavor to Silver Lake was completed on March 24, 2025. Following the sale to Silver Lake, Endeavor began branding itself as "the WME Group".

== Holdings ==
International

- Endeavor (founded in June 2016) – a Chinese subsidiary formed with the investments from Sequoia Capital, Tencent and FountainVest

Talent agencies

- WME – talent agency representing entertainers, athletes, and fashion designers
- Dixon Talent – talent agency representing late-night and other television (TV) hosts
- The Wall Group – talent agency representing stylists and designers
- Global eSports Management – talent agency representing professional video game players and personalities
- Rabineau Wachter Sanford & Gillett – literary agency
- Ross Yoon Agency – literary agency

Branding, promotions, advertising

- 160 over 90, (acquired in January 2018) – a company specializing in PR and advertising for entertainment and experiential events
- Wonderful Union (acquired in August 2018) – a company that develops and executes promotions, contests, brand sponsorships and advertisements

Movies

- Fifth Season (known as Endeavor Content from October 2017 – September 2022) – a company specializing in film financing and scripted TV sales
- Bloom (acquired a majority stake in August 2017) – a film finance and sales company

Broadcasting and publications

- Endeavor Streaming – a digital video technology company
- Pantheon Media Group (acquired majority stake in March 2023) – an unscripted production company
  - 45Live
  - Asylum Entertainment
  - Audity
  - Big City TV
  - BreakLight Pictures
  - DARE Entertainment
  - Done and Dusted
  - Film45
  - Ladywell Films
  - Moon&Back Media
  - Pantheon Studios
  - Pantheon Studios International
  - Soho Studios Entertainment
  - Texas Crew Productions
  - Tyler Perry Studios Unscripted
- Third Coast Content (made investment in February 2018) – a film, television and publishing company

Sports and camping

- Camp Summer Eagle – Endeavor's summer camp donations, volunteering and activities arm
- EuroLeague – a basketball league operated as a joint venture between Endeavor and EuroLeague Basketball
- ELeague – an eSports league that initially operated as a joint venture between Endeavor and Turner Broadcasting System
- TKO Group Holdings (63.9%) – a sports and entertainment media conglomerate
  - WWE – a professional wrestling organization
    - WWE's divisions and subsidiaries
  - UFC – a mixed martial arts organization
    - UFC BJJ
    - PRIDE
    - WEC
    - WFA
    - Strikeforce
  - PBR – a professional bull riding organization
  - IMG – talent agency representing entertainers, athletes, and fashion designers
    - Learfield IMG College
      - 120 Sports
      - Campus Insiders
      - Longhorn Network
  - On Location Experiences (acquired in January 2020) – a company specializing in ticket sales and live experience management for sporting events
  - Zuffa Boxing – a professional boxing organization
