= Maria Quiban =

American weather anchor

- Born: Cebu City, Philippines
- Citizenship: United States
- Education: Mississippi State University (BS)
- Occupation: Meteorologist/TV Anchor
- Years active: 1991–present
- Employer: KTTV/KCOP-TV 2000–present
- Spouse(s): Brian Messner (m. 1999; div. 2001) Sean Whitesell (m. 2009; died 2015)
- Children: 2
- Website: mariaquiban.com

Maria Quiban is an American weather anchor for KTTV in Los Angeles, California.

== Early life ==
Quiban was born in Cebu City, Philippines, and moved to Hawaii at age 10 with her mother and her brother. She graduated from Aiea High School, studied journalism at the University of Hawaii at Manoa, and earned a degree in meteorology from Mississippi State University.

== Career ==
Quiban worked for the local NBC affiliate KHNL in Honolulu before moving in 1998 to Los Angeles to work as the weather anchor for the Orange County Newschannel. In 2000, she accepted employment as the weather anchor/meteorologist for KTTV.

Quiban has appeared in numerous television shows and films playing a reporter including Bruce Almighty, Cold Case, Everybody Hates Chris, Criminal Minds and Ryan's Mystery Playdate. She played the role of a murder victim in the film Blood Work.

In 2020, Quiban released her book You Can't Do It Alone: A Widow's Journey Through Loss, Grief, and Life After.

== Personal life ==
Quiban had a son when she was in high school. On September 9, 1999, she married Brian Messner. Her third husband, Sean Whitesell, died of glioblastoma multiforme on December 28, 2015. They had one son, Gus Whitesell.
