= Writers Guild of America Award for Television: Documentary Script – Current Events =

- Awarded for: Outstanding Writing in Documentaries – Current Events
- Country: United States
- Presented by: Writers Guild of America
- First award: 1988
- Final award: 2022
- Website: www.wga.org

The Writers Guild of America Award for Television: Documentary Script – Current Events was an award presented by the Writers Guild of America to the best writing in a documentary about current events. It was first awarded at the 41st Writers Guild of America Awards, being the episode "Apartheid Part 5: 1987" from the American program Frontline the inaugural winner of the category. After the 75th Writers Guild of America Awards, the award was combined with Documentary Script – Other Than Current Events into one Documentary Script category.

== Winners and nominees ==
=== 1980s ===
Year	Program	Episode	Writer(s)	Network	Ref.
1988 (41st)	Frontline	"Apartheid Part 5: 1987"	Irv Drasnin	PBS	
1989 (42nd)	Secret Intelligence		Joseph Angier and Blaine Baggett	PBS	

=== 1990s ===
Year	Program	Episode	Writer(s)	Network	Ref.
1990 (43rd)	Frontline	"Seven Days in Bensonhurst"	Thomas Lennon and Shelby Steele	PBS	
1991 (44th)	Power in the Pacific		Joseph Angier and Carl Byker	PBS	
1992 (45th)	No award given				
1993 (46th)	Frontline	"The Choice '92"	Richard Ben Gramer, Thomas Lennon and Michael Epstein	PBS	
1993 (46th)	Frontline	"The Arming of Saudi Arabia"	Rory O’Connor	PBS	
1993 (46th)	Nova	"Brain Transplant"	Jon Palfreman	PBS	
1993 (46th)	The Patriot Missile: Hero or Hoax?		Fred Warshofsky	A&E	
1994 (47th)	No award given				
1995 (48th)	The Human Quest	"The Nature of Human Nature"	Roger Bingham and Carl Byker	PBS	
1995 (48th)	48 Hours	"The Rage Over Welfare"	Greg Kandra	CBS	
1995 (48th)	Frontline	"Rush Lumbaugh's America"	Stephen Talbot	PBS	
1995 (48th)	Frontline	"Currents of Fear"	Jon Palfreman	PBS	
1996 (49th)	Frontline	"The Pilgrimage of Jesse Jackson"	Marshall Frady and Mark Zwonitzer	PBS	
1996 (49th)	Primetime Live	"Judgement at Midnight"	Mark Zwonitzer	ABC	
1996 (49th)	Nova	"Bombing of America"	Nancy Linde	PBS	
1997 (50th)	Dateline NBC	"Why Can't We Live Together?"	Craig Leake	NBC	
1997 (50th)	Frontline	"The Choice 1996"	Helen Whitney and Jane Barnes	PBS	
1998 (51st)	Frontline	"Once Upon a Time in Arkansas"	Michael Kirk and Peter J. Boyer	PBS	
1998 (51st)	Primetime Live	"The McCaughey Seven: A Homecoming"	Lori A. Bores	ABC	
1998 (51st)	Frontline	"Busted: America's War on Marijuana"	Elena Mannes	PBS	
1999 (52nd)	Frontline	"Give War A Chance"	Michael Kirk and Peter J. Boyer	PBS	
1999 (52nd)	Dateline NBC	"The Greatest Generation"	Tom Brokaw and Craig Leake	NBC	
1999 (52nd)	Frontline	"Surviving Aids"	Martin Smith and Lowell Bergman	PBS	
1999 (52nd)	Nova	"Surviving Aids"	Elizabeth Arledge		
1999 (52nd)	The Awful Truth	"Funeral in a HMO"	Annie Cohen, Francis Gasparini, Henriette Mantel, Jay Martel, Nick McKinney and Michael Moore	Bravo	

=== 2000s ===
Year	Program	Episode	Writer(s)	Network	Ref.
2000 (53rd)	Frontline	"John Paul II: The Millennial Pope"	Helen Whitney and Jane Barnes	PBS	
2000 (53rd)	The Awful Truth	"Holiday Inn Attempts to Deport Its Mexican Housekeepers for Organizing a Union"	Michael Moore and Nick McKinney	Bravo	
2000 (53rd)	Frontline	"Justice for Sale"	Stephen Talbot and Sheila Kaplan	PBS	
2000 (53rd)	Frontline	"The Killer at Thurston High"	Michael J. Kirk and Peter J. Boyer	PBS	
2001 (54th)	Frontline	"Drug Wars: Part 2"	Lowell Bergman, Kenneth Levism, Doug Hamilton and Oriana Zill	PBS	
2001 (54th)	Frontline	"Drug Wars, Part 1"	Martin Smith, Brooke Runnette and Oriana Zill	PBS	
2002 (55th)	9/11		Tom Forman and Greg Kandra	CBS	
2002 (55th)	Frontline	"The Man Who Knew"	Michael Kirk	PBS	
2002 (55th)	Frontline	"Rollover: The Hidden Story of the SUV"	Marc Shaffer and Barak Goodman	PBS	
2002 (55th)	Nova	"Bioterror"	Matthew Collins	PBS	
2003 (56th)	Frontline	"Truth, War and Consequences"	Martin Smith	PBS	
2003 (56th)	Frontline	"The War Behind Closed Doors"	Michael Kirk	PBS	
2004 (57th)	Frontline	"From China With Love"	Michael Kirk	PBS	
2004 (57th)	Last Man Standing: Politics Texas Style	"P.O.V."	Paul Stekler	PBS	
2005 (58th)	Frontline	"The Torture Question"	Edward Grey	PBS	
2005 (58th)	Someone's Watching		Michael Kirk	PBS	
2005 (58th)	Frontline	"Is Wal-Mart Good for America?"	Hedrick Smith	PBS	
2005 (58th)	Frontline	"The Soldier's Heart"	Raney Aronson	PBS	
2006 (59th)	Frontline	"The Dark Side"	Michael Kirk	PBS	
2006 (59th)	Frontline	"The Meth Epidemic"	Cark Byker	PBS	
2006 (59th)	Frontline	"The Age of AIDS"	William Cran and Renata Simone	PBS	
2006 (59th)	Frontline	"Can You Afford to Retire?"	Hedrick Smith and Rick Young	PBS	
2007 (60th)	Frontline	"Return of the Taliban"	Martin Smith	PBS	
2007 (60th)	America at a Crossroads	"Security vs. Liberty: The Other War"	Edward Gray	PBS	
2007 (60th)	Frontline	"The Enemy Within"	Lowell Bergman and Oriana Zill De Granados	PBS	
2007 (60th)	Frontline	"News War Part 1: Secrets Sources and Spin"	Raney Aronson-Rath, Lowell Bergman and Seth Bomse	PBS	
2007 (60th)	Frontline	"News War Part 3: What's Happening to the News?"	Stephen Talbot and Lowell Bergman	PBS	
2007 (60th)	Frontline	"Spying on the Home Front"	Hedrick Smith and Rick Young	PBS	
2008 (61st)	Frontline	"Bush's War: Part One"	Michael Kirk	PBS	
2008 (61st)	Nova	"Judgment Day: Intelligent Design on Trial"	Joseph McMaster	PBS	
2008 (61st)	Depression: Out of the Shadows		Larkin McPhee	PBS	
2008 (61st)	Frontline	"Rules of Engagement"	Arun Rath	PBS	
2008 (61st)	Frontline	"The Medicated Child"	Marcela Gaviria	PBS	
2009 (62nd)	Frontline	"The Madoff Affair"	Marcela Gaviria and Martin Smith	PBS	
2009 (62nd)	Frontline	"Black Money"	Lowell Bergman and Oriana Zill de Granados	PBS	
2009 (62nd)	Frontline	"Heat"	Martin Smith	PBS	
2009 (62nd)	Frontline	"The Hugo Chávez Show"	Ofra Bikel	PBS	
2009 (62nd)	Frontline	"Inside the Meltdown"	Michael Kirk	PBS	
2009 (62nd)	Frontline	"Poisoned Waters"	Hedrick Smith and Rick Young	PBS	

=== 2010s ===
Year	Program	Episode	Writer(s)	Network	Ref.
2010 (63rd)	Frontline	"Flying Cheap"	Rick Young	PBS	
2010 (63rd)	Frontline	"College, Inc."	Martin Smith and John Maggio	PBS	
2010 (63rd)	Frontline	"The Card Game"	Lowell Bergman and Oriana Zill de Granados	PBS	
2010 (63rd)	Frontline	"The Quake"	Martin Smith and Marcela Gaviria	PBS	
2010 (63rd)	Frontline	"The Vaccine War"	Jon Palfreman	PBS	
2010 (63rd)	Frontline	"The Warning"	Michael Kirk	PBS	
2011 (64th)	Frontline	"Top Secret America"	Michael Kirk and Mike Wiser	PBS	
2011 (64th)	Nova	“Smartest Machine on Earth”	Julia Cort and Michael Bicks	PBS	
2011 (64th)	Frontline	“The Spill”	Marcela Gaviria and Martin Smith	PBS	
2012 (65th)	Frontline	"Money, Power and Wall Street: Episode One"	Marcela Gaviria and Martin Smith	PBS	
2012 (65th)	Frontline	"The Anthrax Files"	Michael Kirk	PBS	
2012 (65th)	Frontline	"Lost in Detention"	Rick Young	PBS	
2012 (65th)	Frontline	"Money, Power and Wall Street: Episode Three"	Michael Kirk and Mike Wiser	PBS	
2012 (65th)	Frontline	"Money, Power and Wall Street: Episode Four"	Marcela Gaviria and Martin Smith	PBS	
2012 (65th)	Frontline	"A Perfect Terrorist"	Thomas Jennings	PBS	
2013 (66th)	Frontline	"Egypt in Crisis"	Marcela Gaviria and Martin Smith	PBS	
2013 (66th)	Frontline	"Cliffhanger"	Michael Kirk and Mike Wiser	PBS	
2014 (67th)	Frontline	"United States of Secrets: The Program (Part One)"	Michael Kirk and Mike Wiser	PBS	
2014 (67th)	Frontline	"United States of Secrets: Privacy Lost (Part Two)"	Martin Smith	PBS	
2014 (67th)	Frontline	"Losing Iraq"	Michael Kirk and Mike Wiser	PBS	
2015 (68th)	Frontline	"American Terrorist"	Thomas Jennings	PBS	
2015 (68th)	Frontline	"Gunned Down: The Power of the NRA"	Michael Kirk and Mike Wiser	PBS	
2016 (69th)	Frontline	"The Choice 2016"	Michael Kirk and Mike Wiser	PBS	
2016 (69th)	Frontline	"Inside Assad's Syria"	Martin Smith	PBS	
2016 (69th)	Frontline	"Chasing Heroin"	Marcela Gaviria	PBS	
2017 (70th)	Frontline	"Confronting ISIS"	Martin Smith	PBS	
2017 (70th)	Unseen Enemy		Janet Tobias	CNN	
2017 (70th)	Frontline	"Poverty, Politics and Profit"	Rick Young	PBS	
2018 (71st)	Frontline	"Trump's Takeover"	Michael Kirk and Mike Wiser	PBS	
2018 (71st)	Nova	"Black Hole Apocalypse"	Rushmore DeNooyer	PBS	
2018 (71st)	Frontline	"Blackout in Puerto Rico"	Rick Young	PBS	
2018 (71st)	Frontline	"The Gang Crackdown"	Marcela Gaviria	PBS	
2019 (72nd)	Frontline	"Trump's Trade War"	Marcela Gaviria	PBS	
2019 (72nd)	Frontline	"Coal's Deadly Dust"	Elaine McMillion Sheldon	PBS	
2019 (72nd)	Frontline	"The Mueller Investigation"	Michael Kirk and Mike Wiser	PBS	

=== 2020s ===
Year	Program	Episode	Writer(s)	Network	Ref.
2020 (73rd)	Agents of Chaos	"Part II"	Alex Gibney and Michael J. Palmer	HBO	
2020 (73rd)	Frontline	"The Choice 2020: Trump vs. Biden"	Michael Kirk and Mike Wiser	PBS	
2020 (73rd)	Frontline	"Whose Vote Counts"	Jelani Cobb, June Cross and Tom Jennings	PBS	
2020 (73rd)	Agents of Chaos	"Part I"	Alex Gibney and Michael J. Palmer	HBO	
2021 (74th)	Frontline	"The Healthcare Divide"	Rick Young	PBS	
2021 (74th)	Frontline	"The Jihadist"	Martin Smith and Marcela Gaviria	PBS	
2022 (75th)	Frontline	"Lies, Politics and Democracy"	Michael Kirk & Mike Wiser	PBS	
2022 (75th)	Hiding in Plain Sight: Youth Mental Illness	"Episode Two: Resilience"	David Blistein	PBS	
2022 (75th)	Vice News Tonight	"Inside the Alleged Sexual Assault Cover Up in Charlotte Schools"	Arlissa Norman, Carter Sherman, Gilad Thaler	Vice.com	

== Programs with multiple awards ==
27 awards

- Frontline (PBS)

== Programs with multiple nominations ==
78 nominations

- Frontline (PBS)

6 nominations

- Nova (PBS)

2 nominations

- Primetime Live (ABC)
- The Awful Truth (Bravo)
- Agents of Chaos (HBO)
- Dateline NBC (NBC)

== See also ==
- Primetime Emmy Award for Outstanding Writing for a Nonfiction Programming
