= 73rd Writers Guild of America Awards =

73rd WGA Awards
- Date: March 21, 2021
- Organized by: Writers Guild of America, East and the Writers Guild of America West

The 73rd Writers Guild of America Awards honored the best writing in film, television and radio of 2020. Nominees for television and radio were announced on February 3, 2021, while nominees for film were announced on February 16, 2021. The winners were announced in a virtual ceremony on March 21, 2021.

== Winners and Nominees ==
=== Film ===
Best Original Screenplay
- Promising Young Woman (Focus Features) — Emerald Fennell †
  - Judas and the Black Messiah (Warner Bros. Pictures) – Will Berson & Shaka King; story by Will Berson & Shaka King and Kenny Lucas & Keith Lucas
  - Palm Springs (Hulu) — Andy Siara; story by Andy Siara & Max Barbakow
  - Sound of Metal (Amazon Studios) — Darius Marder & Abraham Marder; story by Darius Marder & Derek Cianfrance
  - The Trial of the Chicago 7 (Netflix) — Aaron Sorkin
Best Adapted Screenplay
- Borat Subsequent Moviefilm (Amazon Studios) — Sacha Baron Cohen & Anthony Hines & Dan Swimer & Peter Baynham & Erica Rivinoja & Dan Mazer & Jena Friedman & Lee Kern; story by Sacha Baron Cohen & Anthony Hines & Dan Swimer & Nina Pedrad; based on characters created by Sacha Baron Cohen
  - Ma Rainey's Black Bottom (Netflix) — Ruben Santiago-Hudson; based on the play by August Wilson
  - News of the World (Universal Pictures) — Paul Greengrass and Luke Davies; based upon the novel by Paulette Jiles
  - One Night in Miami... (Amazon Studios) — Kemp Powers; based on the stage play by Kemp Powers
  - The White Tiger (Netflix) — Ramin Bahrani; based on the book by Aravind Adiga
Best Documentary Screenplay
- The Dissident (Briarcliff Entertainment) — Mark Monroe and Bryan Fogel
  - All In: The Fight for Democracy (Amazon Studios) — Jack Youngelson
  - Herb Alpert Is... (Abramorama) — John Scheinfeld
  - Red Penguins (Universal Pictures) — Gabe Polsky
  - Totally Under Control (Neon) — Alex Gibney

=== Television ===
Drama Series
- The Crown (Netflix) – Peter Morgan and Jonathan Wilson
  - Better Call Saul (AMC) – Ann Cherkis, Vince Gilligan, Peter Gould, Ariel Levine, Heather Marion, Thomas Schnauz, Gordon Smith, Alison Tatlock
  - The Boys (Amazon Studios) – Eric Kripke, Ellie Monahan, Anslem Richardson, Craig Rosenberg, Michael Saltzman, Rebecca Sonnenshine
  - The Mandalorian (Disney+) – Rick Famuyiwa, Jon Favreau, Dave Filoni
  - Ozark (Netflix) – Laura Deeley, Bill Dubuque, Paul Kolsby, Miki Johnson, Chris Mundy, John Shiban, Ning Zhou, Martin Zimmerman
Comedy Series
- Ted Lasso (Apple TV+) – Jane Becker, Leann Bowen, Brett Goldstein, Brendan Hunt, Joe Kelly, Bill Lawrence, Jamie Lee, Jason Sudeikis, Phoebe Walsh, Bill Wrubel
  - Curb Your Enthusiasm (HBO) – Larry David, Justin Hurwitz, Steve Leff, Carol Leifer, Jeff Schaffer
  - The Great (Hulu) – Vanessa Alexander, Tony McNamara, Tess Morris, Amelia Roper, Gretel Vella, James Wood
  - PEN15 (Hulu) – Alyssa DiMari, Maya Erskine, Anna Konkle, Josh Levine, Gabe Liedman, Rachele Lynn, Vera Santamaria, Diana Tay, Sam Zvibleman
  - What We Do in the Shadows (FX) – Jake Bender, Jemaine Clement, Zach Dunn, Joe Furey, Shana Gohd, Sam Johnson, Chris Marcil, William Meny, Sarah Naftalis, Stefani Robinson, Marika Sawyer, Paul Simms
New Series
- Ted Lasso (Apple TV+) – Jane Becker, Leann Bowen, Brett Goldstein, Brendan Hunt, Joe Kelly, Bill Lawrence, Jamie Lee, Jason Sudeikis, Phoebe Walsh, Bill Wrubel
  - Dave (FX) – Dave Burd, Vanessa McGee, Saladin Patterson, Luvh Rakhe, Alex Russell, Jeff Schaffer, Max Searle, Yamara Taylor
  - The Flight Attendant (HBO Max) – Kara Lee Corthron, Michael Foley, Ryan Jennifer Jones, Ticona S. Joy, Meredith Lavender, Jess Meyer, Daniele Nathanson, Marcie Ulin, Ian Weinreich, Steve Yockey
  - The Great (Hulu) – Vanessa Alexander, Tony McNamara, Tess Morris, Amelia Roper, Gretel Vella, James Wood
  - Lovecraft Country (HBO) – Misha Green, Shannon Houston, Jonathan Kidd, Kevin Lau, Ihuoma Ofordire, Wes Taylor, Sonya Winton
Long Form – Original
- Mrs. America (FX) – Tanya Barfield, Joshua Allen Griffith, Sharon Hoffman, Boo Killebrew, Micah Schraft, April Shih, Dahvi Waller
  - Dirty John: The Betty Broderick Story (USA Network) – Aaron Carew, Alexandra Cunningham, Lex Edness, Kevin J. Hynes, Juliet Lashinsky-Revene, Stacy A. Littlejohn, Katherine B. McKenna
  - Hollywood (Netflix) – Ian Brennan, Janet Mock, Ryan Murphy, Reilly Smith
  - Safety (Disney+) – Nick Santora
  - Uncle Frank (Amazon Studios) – Alan Ball
Long Form – Adapted
- The Queen's Gambit (Netflix) – Written by Scott Frank, Allan Scott, Based on the novel by Walter Tevis
  - Bad Education (HBO) – Written by Mike Makowsky, Based on the New York Magazine article "The Bad Superintendent' by Robert Kolker
  - Clouds (Disney+) – Screenplay by Kara Holden; Story by Casey La Scala & Patrick Kopka and Kara Holden, Based on the book entitled "Fly A Little Higher' by Laura Sobiech
  - The Good Lord Bird (Showtime) – Written by Jeff Augustin, Ethan Hawke, Erika L. Johnson, Mark Richard, Kristen SaBerre, Lauren Signorino, Based on the Novel by James McBride
  - Little Fires Everywhere (Hulu) – Written by Harris Danow, Rosa Handelman, Shannon Houston, Attica Locke, Raamla Mohamed, Amy Talkington, Liz Tigelaar, Nancy Won, Based on the book by Celeste Ng
Short Form New Media – Original
- #freerayshawn (Quibi) – Written by Marc Maurino
  - Better Call Saul Employee Training: Legal Ethics with Kim Wexler (AMC Digital on YouTube) – Written by Ariel Levine
  - Most Dangerous Game (Quibi) – Written by Nick Santora, Story by Josh Harmon and Scott Elder
Animation
- "Xerox of a Xerox" – BoJack Horseman (Netflix) – Written by Nick Adams
  - "A Springfield Summer Christmas for Christmas" – The Simpsons (Fox) – Written by Jessica Conrad
  - "Bart The Bad Guy" – The Simpsons (Fox) – Written by Dan Vebber
  - "I, Carumbus" – The Simpsons (Fox) – Written by Cesar Mazariegos
  - "Three Dreams Denied" – The Simpsons (Fox) – Written by Danielle Weisberg
  - "Prank You for Being A Friend" – Bob's Burgers (Fox) – Written by Katie Crown
Episodic Drama
- "Fire Pink" – Ozark (Netflix) – Written by Miki Johnson
  - "Bad Choice Road" – Better Call Saul (AMC) – Written by Thomas Schnauz
  - "JMM" – Better Call Saul (AMC) – Written by Alison Tatlock
  - "Raised by Wolves" – Raised by Wolves (HBO Max) – Written by Aaron Guzikowski
  - "Something Unforgivable" – Better Call Saul (AMC) – Written by Peter Gould & Ariel Levine
  - "Trouble Don't Last Always" – Euphoria (HBO) – Written by Sam Levinson
Episodic Comedy
- "The Great" – The Great (Hulu) – Written by Tony McNamara
  - "Grandma & Chill" – Awkwafina Is Nora from Queens (Comedy Central) – Written by Kyle Lau
  - "It's Not You, It's Me" – Dead to Me (Netflix) – Written by Liz Feldman & Kelly Hutchinson
  - "Pilot" – Ted Lasso (Apple TV+) – Teleplay by Jason Sudeikis & Bill Lawrence, Story by Jason Sudeikis & Bill Lawrence & Brendan Hunt & Joe Kelly
  - "The Tank" – Grace and Frankie (Netflix) – Written by Alex Kavallierou
  - "Trick" – High Maintenance (HBO) – Written by Isaac Oliver
Comedy/Variety – Talk Series
- Desus & Mero (Showtime) – Writers: Daniel "Desus Nice" Baker, Claire Friedman, Ziwe Fumudoh, Josh Gondelman, Robert Kornhauser, Joel "The Kid Mero" Martinez, Heben Nigatu, Mike Pielocik, Julia Young
  - Full Frontal with Samantha Bee (TBS) – Writers: Kristen Bartlett, Samantha Bee, Pat Cassels, Sean Crespo, Mike Drucker, Mathan Erhardt, Joe Grossman, Miles Kahn, Sahar Rizvi, Chris Thompson, Holly Walker, Allison Silverman
  - Last Week Tonight with John Oliver (HBO) – Writers: Johnathan Appel, Ali Barthwell, Tim Carvell, Liz Hynes, Greg Iwinski, Mark Kramer, Daniel O'Brien, John Oliver, Owen Parsons, Charlie Redd, Joanna Rothkopf, Chrissy Shackelford, Ben Silva, Seena Vali
  - Late Night with Seth Meyers (NBC) – Head Writer: Alex Baze; Writing Supervised by: Seth Reiss; Closer Look Writing Supervised by: Sal Gentile; Writers: Jermaine Affonso, Karen Chee, Bryan Donaldson, Matt Goldich, Dina Gusovsky, Jenny Hagel, Allison Hord, Mike Karnell, John Lutz, Seth Meyers, Ian Morgan, John Mulaney, Amber Ruffin, Mike Scollins, Mike Shoemaker, Ben Warheit, Jeff Wright
  - The Late Show with Stephen Colbert (CBS) – Head Writers: Ariel Dumas, Jay Katsir; Writers: Delmonte Bent, Michael Brumm, River Clegg, Aaron Cohen, Nicole Conlan, Stephen T. Colbert, Paul Dinello, Glenn Eichler, Django Gold, Gabe Gronli, Barry Julien, Michael Cruz Kayne, Eliana Kwartler, Matt Lappin, Felipe Torres Medina, Opus Moreschi, Asher Perlman, Tom Purcell, Kate Sidley, Brian Stack, John Thibodeaux, Steve Waltien
Comedy/Variety – Specials
- Stephen Colbert's Election Night 2020: Democracy's Last Stand: Building Back America Great Again Better 2020 (Showtime) – Head Writers: Ariel Dumas, Jay Katsir; Writers: Delmonte Bent, Michael Brumm, River Clegg, Aaron Cohen, Nicole Conlan, Stephen T. Colbert, Paul Dinello, Glenn Eichler, Django Gold, Gabe Gronli, Barry Julien, Michael Cruz Kayne, Eliana Kwartler, Matt Lappin, Felipe Torres Medina, Opus Moreschi, Asher Perlman, Tom Purcell, Kate Sidley, Brian Stack, John Thibodeaux, Steve Waltien
  - 30 Rock: A One-Time Special (NBC) – Written by Tina Fey & Robert Carlock
  - Father of the Bride Part 3 (ish) (YouTube) – Written by Nancy Meyers
  - Yearly Departed (Amazon Studios) – Head Writer: Bess Kalb Writers: Karen Chee, Akilah Green, Franchesca Ramsey, Jocelyn Richard
Comedy/Variety – Sketch Series
- At Home with Amy Sedaris (truTV) – Writers: Jeremy Beiler, Cole Escola, Peter Grosz, Amy Sedaris
  - The Amber Ruffin Show (Peacock) – Head Writer: Jenny Hagel Writers: Demi Adejuyigbe, Shantira Jackson, Dewayne Perkins, Amber Ruffin Additional Material by John Lutz
  - How To with John Wilson (HBO) – Writers: Michael Koman, John Wilson
Quiz and Audience Participation
- Weakest Link (NBC) – Head Writer: Ann Slichter Writers: Chip Dornell, Paul Greenberg, Joyce Ikemi, Stuart Krasnow, Jon Macks, Mona Mira, Scott Saltzburg, Aaron Solomon, Chris Sturgeon, Grant Taylor
  - Hollywood Game Night (NBC) – Head Writers: Ann Slichter, Grant Taylor Writers: Michael Agbabian, Allie Kokesh, Dwight D. Smith
  - Jeopardy! (ABC) – Writers: Matthew Caruso, John Duarte, Harry Friedman, Mark Gaberman, Debbie Griffin, Michele Loud, Robert McClenaghan, Jim Rhine, Billy Wisse
  - Who Wants to Be a Millionaire Celebrity Season (Disney/ABC Syndication) – Head Writer: Bobby Patton Writers: Alan Bailey, Josh Halloway, Seth Harrington, Shawn Kennedy
Daytime Drama
- Days of Our Lives (NBC) – Head Writer: Ron Carlivati; Writers: Lorraine Broderick, Joanna Cohen, Carolyn Culliton, Richard Culliton, Rick Draughon, David Kreizman, Rebecca McCarty, Ryan Quan, Dave Ryan, Katherine D. Schock, Elizabeth Snyder
  - General Hospital (ABC) – Head Writers: Dan O'Connor, Christopher Van Etten; Associate Head Writer: Anna Theresa Cascio; Writers: Barbara Bloom, Suzanne Flynn, Charlotte Gibson, Lucky Gold, Kate Hall, Elizabeth Korte, David Rupel, Lisa Seidman, Donny Sheldon, Scott Sickles

==== Children's ====
Children's Script – Episodic, Long form and Specials
- The Sleepover (Netflix) – Written by Sarah Rothschild
  - "Countdown" – The Astronauts (Nickelodeon) – Written by Dan Knauf
  - Mo Willems And The Storytime All Stars Present: Don't Let The Pigeon Do Storytime (HBO Max) – Written by Mo Willems, Based on the children's books and published by Hyperion: Leonard the Terrible Monster; Knuffle Bunny: A Cautionary Tale; A Busy Creature's Day Eating!; Elephant and Piggy's Waiting is Not Easy!; and Don't Let the Pigeon Drive the Bus!
  - The Not-Too-Late Show with Elmo (HBO Max) – Writers: Geri Cole, Scott Gray, Benjamin Lehmann, Wendy Marston, Andrew Moriarty, Ken Scarborough, Moujan Zolfaghari
  - The Power of We: A Sesame Street Special (HBO Max) – Written by Geri Cole
  - "Speaking of Cancer" – Alexa & Katie (Netflix) – Written by Leo Chu & Eric S. Garcia & Julia Miranda

==== Documentary ====
Documentary Script – Current Events
- "Agents of Chaos, Part II" (HBO) – Written by Alex Gibney & Michael J. Palmer
  - "Agents of Chaos, Part I" (HBO) – Written by Alex Gibney & Michael J. Palmer
  - "The Choice 2020: Trump vs. Biden" – Frontline (PBS) – Written by Michael Kirk & Mike Wiser
  - "Whose Vote Counts" – Frontline (PBS) – Written by Jelani Cobb, June Cross & Tom Jennings
Documentary Script – Other than Current Events
- "Opioids, Inc." – Frontline (PBS) – Written by Tom Jennings
  - "The Poison Squad" – American Experience (PBS) – Written by John Maggio
  - "The Violence Paradox" – Nova (PBS) – Written by Michael Bicks and Anna Lee Strachan

==== News ====
News Script – Regularly Scheduled, Bulletin, or Breaking Report
- "Anger in America" – World News Tonight with David Muir (ABC News) – Written by Dave Bloch, David Muir, Karen Mooney, David Schoetz
  - "Critical Condition" – 60 Minutes (CBS News) – Written by Katie Kerbstat Jacobson, Scott Pelley, Nicole Young
  - "Gale Sayers Obit" (WCBS-TV) – Written by Joe McLaughlin
  - "The Wild West of Covid Testing" – 60 Minutes (CBS News) – Written by Sharyn Alfonsi, Oriana Zill de Granados
News Script – Analysis, Feature, or Commentary
- "Juneteenth: A Celebration of Overcoming" (ABC News) – Written by Dave Bloch
  - "Exhume the Truth" – 60 Minutes (CBS News) – Written by Katie Kerbstat Jacobson, Scott Pelley, Nicole Young
  - "The African Basketball Trail" – 60 Minutes (CBS News) – Written by Oriana Zill de Granados
Digital News
- "The Store That Called the Cops on George Floyd" (Slate.com) – Written by Aymann Ismail
  - "Pornhub Doesn't Care" (Vice.com) – Written by Samantha Cole and Emanuel Maiberg
  - "This Week Has Happened Before" (Slate.com) – Written by Julia Craven
  - "Why Did the Government Separate This Family?" (Slate.com) – Written by Jeremy Stahl

=== Radio ===
Radio News Script – Regularly Scheduled, Bulletin, or Breaking Report
- "Changemakers: Leaders Who Made a Difference" (CBS News Radio) – Written by Gail Lee
  - "CBS News on the Hour with Norah O'Donnell, March 10, 2020″ (CBS News Radio) – Written by James Hutton
  - "World News This Week, November 13, 2020″ (ABC News Radio/WNTW Podcasts) – Written by Joan Harris
Radio News Script – Analysis, Feature, or Commentary
- "Against Those Thugs: Delores Tucker and Bill Bennett" (Slow Burn) (Slate Podcasts) – Written by Joel Anderson, Christopher Johnson
  - "The Gist: Spiel, April 3, 2020″ (Slate Podcasts) – Written by Mike Pesca
  - "Instrument of Hope" (ABC News Radio) – Written by Christopher Barry

=== Promotional writing ===
On-Air Promotion – Television or Radio
- "Get Out The Vote – Check Out Those Moves" (Facebook, Instagram, YouTube) – Written by Meghana Reddy and Angad Bhalla
  - "Can You See It?" (Facebook) – Written by Meghana Reddy and Angad Bhalla
  - "Launch Trailers" (CBS All Access) – Written by Molly Neylan

=== Special awards ===
Paul Selvin Award

Will Berson, Shaka King, and Kenny and Keith Lucas, for Judas and the Black Messiah

Laurel Award for Screenwriting Achievement

Laurel Award for TV Writing Achievement
