= Heist: Who Stole the American Dream? =

Heist
- Directed by: Donald Goldmacher; Frances Causey
- Written by: Frances Causey; Hollis Rich
- Produced by: Donald Goldmacher; Frances Causey
- Starring: Bernie Sanders; Donna Edwards; Robert Crandall; David Brock; Van Jones; David Cay Johnston; Elizabeth Warren
- Narrated by: Thom Hartmann
- Cinematography: Rogelio Garcia
- Music by: David Raiklen
- Distributed by: Connecting the Dots
- Release date: October 13, 2011 (Mill Valley Film Festival)
- Running time: 75 minutes
- Country: United States
- Language: English

Heist: Who Stole the American Dream? is a 2011 documentary film, which argues that government deregulation led to the Great Recession. It was directed and produced by Donald Goldmacher and journalist and former CNN Senior National Assignment Editor Frances Causey. Narrated by Thom Hartmann. The documentary is partially based on Jeff Faux's 2006 book The Global Class War. The film traces the roots of the Great Recession to Virginia lawyer Lewis F. Powell, Jr., whose 1971 memo to the United States Chamber of Commerce urged corporate America to become more aggressive in molding politics and law.

Filmmakers Goldmacher and Causey started work on Heist in 2006 after they had been investigating the exploitation of undocumented workers near the Arizona border. Heist explores the premise that Roosevelt's New Deal is being dismantled piecewise. It documents the aggressive push for free trade agreements such as the North American Free Trade Agreement as well as the deregulation of financial products as evidenced by the repeal of the Glass–Steagall Act and the passage of the Commodity Futures Modernization Act of 2000. Heist lays the blame for the crisis on the cozy relationship between politicians and corporations, citing the Reagan administration as well as the actions of Presidents Clinton and Obama. The documentary ends with suggestions for how people might organize, including tactics employed by Occupy Wall Street.

Heist includes interviews and commentary from Senator Bernie Sanders, Representative Donna Edwards, former American Airlines president Robert Crandall, Media Matters for America founder David Brock, Nomi Prins, Van Jones, Robert Kuttner, Elizabeth Warren, and journalist David Cay Johnston. The documentary premiered at the Mill Valley Film Festival on October 13, 2011.

== Critical reception ==
Heist received generally positive reviews from critics. Slant Magazine called the documentary "remarkably balanced and even-toned." It was designated a Critics' Pick by The New York Times, with Stephen Holden remarking that the film "has the virtue of taking the long view of a crisis that recent films like Inside Job and Too Big to Fail have only sketchily explored." Nick Schager, in The Village Voice, criticized the film's structure, writing that "Combining archival news broadcasts and photos, contemporary protest footage, talking-head interviews, and graphical and cartoon interludes, it's a work that continues the liberal-political documentary subgenre's own war against aesthetic maturity and inventiveness." Kam Williams of AALBC.com called the film "A persuasive case for the swift reinstatement of watchdog laws to prevent bailed-out Wall Street from turning the American Dream into a neverending nightmare for folks on Main Street."

== See also ==
- Who Stole the American Dream?, 2012 book by Hedrick Smith
