= Sharon Tiller =

American film maker

Sharon Tiller is an American film maker who has numerous film and television credits as a writer, director, and producer. She is the WGBH-TV executive-in-charge for the American documentary television series Frontline, which she first joined in 1995 as a senior producer for special projects. She is married to journalist and news producer Lowell Bergman.

== Awards and nominations ==
- 1991: George Polk Awards for National Television
- 2008: News & Documentary Emmy Award – New Approaches to News and Documentary Programming: Arts, Lifestyle and Culture for the Frontline/World episode "Moscow's Sex and the City" (nominated)
