= Agents of Chaos =

Agent(s) of Chaos may refer to:

- The New Jedi Order: Agents of Chaos, a two-part Star Wars story arc
- Agent of Chaos (Norman Spinrad novel)
- Agents of Chaos (miniseries), a 2020 documentary by HBO Documentary Films
