= Russell Smith =

Russell or Russ Smith may refer to:

== Sports ==
- Russ Smith (guard) (1893–1958), American football player
- Russ Smith (running back) (1944–2001), American football player
- Russ Smith (basketball) (born 1991), American basketball player
- Russell Smith (baseball) (born 1998), American baseball player
- Russell Smith (canoeist) (active since 1987), British slalom canoer
- Russell Smith (referee) (active since 1990), rugby league referee

== Law and politics ==
- Russell Evans Smith (1908–1990), US federal judge
- Russell Smith (Australian politician) (born 1946), Australian politician
- Russell Smith (New York politician) (1822–1866), New York politician

== Media and the arts ==
- Russell Smith, American founder of 1998 film production company Mr. Mudd
- Russell Smith (artist) (1812-1896) 18th century artist
- Russell Smith (writer) (born 1963), South African-born Canadian novelist and nonfiction writer
- Russell Smith (producer) (active since 1998), American film producer
- Russell Smith (singer) (1949–2019), American country music singer-songwriter
- Russ Smith (publisher) (born 1955), American newspaper publisher
- Russell Smith (trumpeter) (1890–1966), American jazz musician

== Others ==
- J. Russell Smith (1874–1966), American geographer
- H. Russell Smith (1914–2014), American business executive
- Russell L. Smith, United States Navy sailor
- Russell Lee Smith (1947–1975), American spree killer
