= The Choice 2020 =

2020 television documentary film

- Also known as: The Choice 2020: Trump vs. Biden
- Genre: Documentary
- Directed by: Michael Kirk
- Country of origin: United States
- Original language: English

Production
- Producers: Michael Kirk; Mike Wiser; Philip Bennett; Jim Gilmore; Gabrielle Schonder
- Running time: 120 minutes
- Production companies: Frontline; Kirk Documentary Group

Original release
- Network: PBS
- Release: September 22, 2020

The Choice 2020: Trump vs. Biden is a 2020 television documentary film about the Republican and Democratic Party nominees for the 2020 United States presidential election: President Donald Trump and former Vice President Joe Biden respectively. Produced by the investigative journalism program Frontline for PBS, it aims to better inform American voters in their choice by recounting the two major nominees' character and past deeds. Co-produced and directed by Michael Kirk, the film premiered on PBS and simultaneously made available to stream on the broadcaster's website and YouTube channel on September 22, 2020. Biden would ultimately be elected President of the United States that November, setting a record for the most votes ever received by a presidential candidate. He also became the first man to defeat an incumbent president in 28 years and received the highest percentage of the popular vote over an incumbent president since Franklin Roosevelt in 1932.

== Interviewees ==
- Yamiche Alcindor, PBS NewsHour
- Peter Baker, journalist
- Jill Biden, wife of Joe Biden
- John Bolton, former National Security Advisor
- Carol Moseley Braun, former senator
- Rep. Jim Clyburn, since 1993
- Rudy Giuliani, Donald Trump's lawyer
- Valerie Jarrett, fmr. Obama adviser
- Rep. Jim Jordan, since 2007
- Corey Lewandowski, fmr. Trump campaign manager
- David Marcus, cousin of Roy Cohn
- Peggy Noonan, The Wall Street Journal political columnist
- Valerie Biden Owens, Joe Biden's sister
- Anthony Scaramucci, fmr. Trump campaign adviser
- Yusef Salaam, Central Park jogger case
- Bakari Sellers, CNN political analyst
- Mary Trump, Donald Trump's niece
- Angela Wright, Clarence Thomas accuser

== Production ==
The Choice 2020 is the ninth installment of The Choice, a series of television films produced by the American investigative journalism program Frontline beginning in 1988, with each film aiming to better inform American voters about the two major candidates of a respective presidential election. The installment was first discussed at a Television Critics Association press tour by director Michael Kirk and Frontline executive producer Raney Aronson-Rath on July 28, 2020, and was later formally announced on August 7. A three-minute trailer was released on the same day of its announcement.

Kirk explained that he approached the film seeking a new way of telling the stories of President Donald Trump and former Vice President Joe Biden, as they are "two people who have been in the public eye for a half century". Due to the COVID-19 pandemic afflicting the United States during the 2020 election season, the film's production team could not fully conduct face-to-face interviews as done in previous installments of The Choice. Kirk stated that the team had to use the videotelephony software program Zoom for most of their interviews, stating that "I’m used to interviewing people for hours at a time. Doing that over Zoom is a challenge in its own." At the same time, Kirk considers The Choice 2020 to be the "most important and essential" out of the five installments he has made so far due to the nation's deep political divide, along with the pandemic, a weakened economy, and renewed grievances against systemic racism.

As the film was aired during what Rath described as a "perilous time" for the United States, Frontline decided to release some of its interviews in advance of the film's premiere as part of the program's ongoing Transparency Project, beginning on September 14 with Mary Trump's interview.

== Reception ==
The Daily Beast wrote, "Beyond spin...thoughtful [and] in-depth."
