= Who Stole the American Dream? =

2012 book by Hedrick Smith

- First edition
- Author: Hedrick Smith
- Language: English
- Publisher: Random House
- Publication date: 2012
- Publication place: United States
- Media type: Print (hardback & paperback)
- Pages: 557 pp
- ISBN: 9781400069668
- OCLC: 769990419
- Dewey Decimal: 973.91
- LC Class: E839.5 .S59 2012

Who Stole the American Dream? is a non-fiction book by the American author and journalist Hedrick Smith published in 2012 by Random House.

It describes the consolidation of wealth in the United States, and the dismantling of the middle class. As a result, the American Dream—a national ethos, or a set of ideals in which freedom includes the opportunity for prosperity and success, and an upward social mobility achieved through hard work—is becoming increasingly unattainable.

Although Smith's distinguished journalistic career includes covering the Vietnam War, the Pentagon Papers, and the civil rights movement, serving as the Moscow Bureau Chief for the New York Times, writing a #1 bestseller, and working on 26 prime-time specials for PBS, he views this book as "'absolutely' his most significant achievement."

== Summary and reception ==
A positive review in USA Today summarized the book as follows:

Smith shows how corporate chieftains in cahoots with their stockholders rather than their employees sold out those employees — sold them out with the blessing of U.S. senators, U.S. representatives, U.S. presidents, presidential appointees at executive branch agencies and a bare majority of U.S. Supreme Court Justices validating the decisions of mostly Republican-appointed lower court judges.

Smith suggests that The Powell Memorandum, a widely circulated memo written by Lewis F. Powell, Jr. was instrumental in setting this new political direction for US business leaders. The result was the development of "wedge economics" in the 1980s, in which CEOs no longer balanced the needs of all stakeholders—workers, customers, and investors—but rather maximized profits of investors and executives only.

The book's ten-point plan for reform was described as "familiar territory" by MinnPost:

"revitalize an aging transportation system; invest more in research; embrace industrial policy to spur a manufacturing renaissance; overhaul the tax system; pressure China to trade more fairly; cut defense spending; strengthen safety nets in the housing market and for Social Security and Medicare; rebuild the political center; mobilize the middle class."

Kirkus Reviews called the book a "remarkably comprehensive and coherent analysis of and prescriptions for America's contemporary economic malaise." Washington, D.C.'s Politics and Prose bookstore suggested that "This book is essential reading for all of us who want to understand America today, or why average Americans are struggling to keep afloat." The book also received positive reviews from The Seattle Times, Reuters, and the Huffington Post.

In contrast, Publishers Weekly called the book "depressing", saying that it "doesn't deal adequately with structural and institutional barriers to reform." The Washington Post called the book "rambling, a bit disorganized and crowded with an almost overwhelming number of topics," declaring that "Smith's saga of economic and political polarization is so downbeat and devastating that there seems little hope for his modest blueprint for change." The Columbus Dispatch said "His analysis of the problem is more compelling — if biased — than his solution."

The book was the topic of discussion in several different programs and presentations aired on the C-SPAN networks.

A reviewer in the Tampa Bay Times declared that Smith's "hopefulness that the indomitable American spirit can turn things around through grass roots efforts akin to the recent Arab Spring should make lobbyists and power brokers in Washington nervous, and that's not a bad thing."

== See also ==
- American Dream
- Heist: Who Stole the American Dream?, 2011 documentary film
