= Martin Smith (documentarian) =

American documentary filmmaker (born 1949)

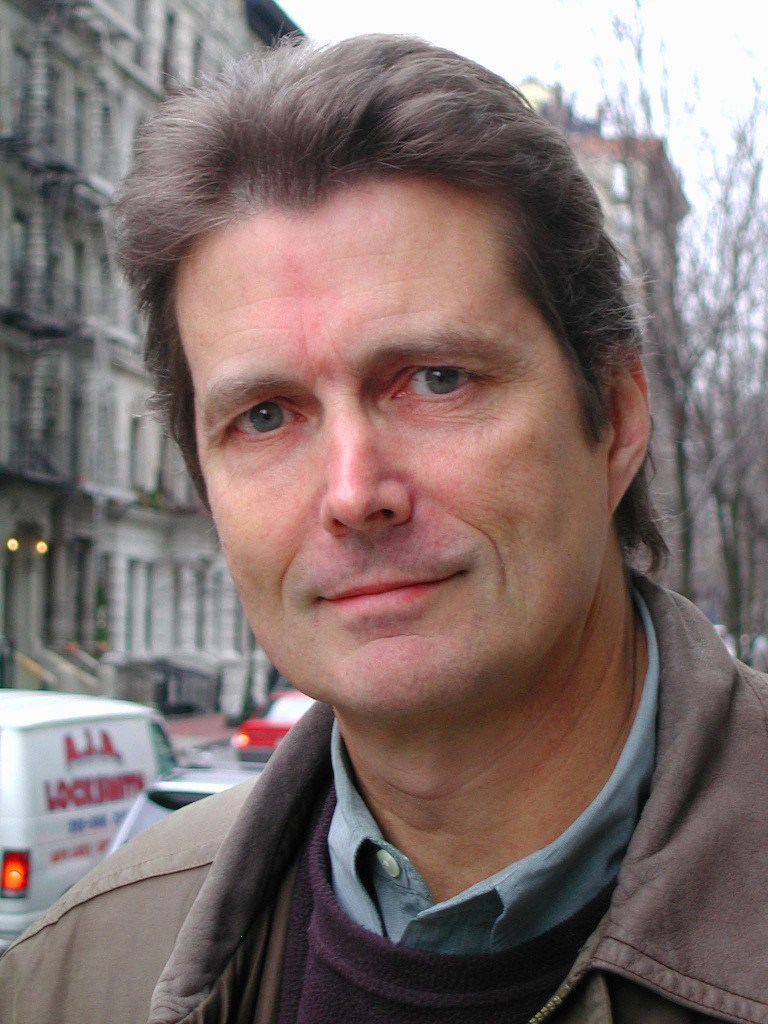
- Smith in New York City (2007)
- Born: Martin Elder Smith; January 28, 1949 (age 77); South Pasadena, California, U.S.
- Education: Brown University (attended); New York University Tisch School of the Arts (BFA, 1975)
- Occupations: Director; writer; producer; correspondent
- Employer: Rain Media
- Known for: Producer and correspondent for FRONTLINE
- Spouse: Marcela Gaviria (2012–present)
- Children: 5
- Website: RainMedia.net

Martin Smith (born January 28, 1949) is an American producer, writer, director and correspondent. Smith has produced dozens of nationally broadcast documentaries for CBS News, ABC News and PBS Frontline. His films range in topic from war in the Middle East to the 2008 financial crisis. He is a member of the Overseas Press Club and the Council on Foreign Relations.

== Early life and education ==
Martin Elder Smith was born on January 28, 1949 in Los Angeles County, California, to Elden Smith, as the nephew of H. Russell Smith.

He was raised on a citrus farm in Riverside, California until his family moved to Los Angeles when he was ten years old. He graduated from The Harvard School for Boys in 1967. He studied Comparative Literature at Brown University and has a BFA (1975) from the Institute of Film & Television at the Tisch School of the Arts of New York University.

== Career ==
In 1976, Smith was a film editor at CBS News. In 1982, Smith directed and wrote "Guatemala", a documentary, which won a George Polk Award and an Emmy. In 1983, Smith produced for the PBS series NOVA and FRONTLINE.

In 1986 he produced "Who's Running This War" for FRONTLINE, it cited a Colonel North who was operating out of the basement of the Reagan White House". It won a George Polk Award. In 1989 he was executive producer of "Inside Gorbachev's USSR" with Hedrick Smith, winning a George Polk Award and DuPont-Columbia Gold Baton. In 1990, he was hired as a senior producer at FRONTLINE.

Between 1994 and 1998, Smith worked with Peter Jennings, the ABC News anchor, as a senior producer for Peter Jennings Reporting, including "Hiroshima: Why the Bomb was Dropped", recipient of a 1995 Edward R. Murrow Award in and a n.d. Peabody Award.

In 1998 Smith founded an independent production company, as RAIN Media. It produced programs for FRONTLINE, including: "The Terrorist and the Superpower", which was produced three years before the attacks on the World Trade Towers and the Pentagon.

After the September 11 attacks, Smith produced films on the attacks – "Looking for Answers" (2001), and "Saudi Time Bomb?" (2001). They won a DuPont-Columbia Gold Baton, jurors said: "the series never flinches from showing why terrorist groups harbor such hate for America and includes people whose attitudes toward the United States are undoubtedly offensive to many viewers. Yet all of the programs are balanced and never sensationalized."

In three films, "In Search of Al Qaeda", (2002), "Return of the Taliban" (2006) and "Obama's War" (2008), Smith twice interviewed President Pervez Musharaff on Pakistan's duplicitous Afghanistan policy. This work had a major impact on US policy at the time, revealing Pakistan's double dealing. Excerpts from "Return of the Taliban" were used by US commander Karl Eikenberry in high level briefings of Bush administration officials.

After the 2003 invasion of Iraq, Smith produced four films on Iraq for FRONTLINE: "Gangs of Iraq" (2007), "Private Warriors" (2005), "Beyond Baghdad" (2004) and "Truth, War and Consequences" (2003).

Smith has produced films about business and finance: "HEAT" (international business leaders reacting to calls for carbon reduction in the face of climate change), "The Madoff Affair" (world's biggest Ponzi scheme). "Money, Power and Wall Street" (causes of the 2008 financial crisis) won a George Polk Award

Smith completed "The Untouchables" which examined the Justice Department's failure to hold Wall Street bankers accountable for mortgage fraud in the run-up to the 2008 collapse. "The Untouchables" sparked an enormous reaction after its initial airing. Two Senators, citing Smith's interview with a senior Justice Department official in the documentary, demanded that Attorney General Eric Holder explain the department's position regarding not investigating big banks for alleged crimes for fear of collateral consequences. Several US attorneys' offices have screened the film and redoubled their efforts to investigate cases of fraud on Wall Street.

Smith produced "The Rise of ISIS," "Life in Baghdad," "Inside Assad's Syria," "Confronting ISIS," "Inside Yemen," "Bitter Rivals: Iran and Saudi Arabia" and "The Crown Prince of Saudi Arabia."

In 2020, with his wife Marcela Gaviria, Smith produced, wrote and directed "The Virus: What Went Wrong?" for FRONTLINE.

== Personal life ==
After living in New York City for many years with his wife and producing partner Marcela Gaviria of Bogotá, Colombia and raising a family, they moved to the Western Catskills area of New York State. He has five children and six grandchildren.

== Filmography ==
sources:

- CBS Reports: "Guatemala" (1982) Producer, Writer
- CBS Reports: "Central America in Revolt" (1982) Producer, Writer
- CBS Our Town with Bill Moyers: "Toxic" (1983) Producer, Writer
- FRONTLINE: "Crisis in Central America" (1984) Producer, Writer
- FRONTLINE: "Who's Running This War" (18 March 1986) Producer, Writer, Correspondent
- FRONTLINE: "The Bombing of West Philly" (5 May 1987) Producer, Writer
- NOVA: "How Good is Soviet Science?" (20 October 1987) Producer, Writer
- FRONTLINE: "Who Pays for AIDS?" (7 June 1988) Producer, Writer, Correspondent
- FRONTLINE: "The Real Life of Ronald Reagan" (18 January 1989) Producer, Writer
- WGBH: "Inside Gorbachev's USSR" (April-May 1990) four hour mini-series) Executive Producer, Writer
- FRONTLINE: "After Gorbachev's USSR" (25 February 1992) Senior Producer
- ABC NEWS: "Peter Jennings Reporting: In the Name of God" (1995) Producer, Writer
- ABC NEWS: "Peter Jennings Reporting: Why the Bomb was Dropped" (1995) Senior Producer
- ABC NEWS: "Peter Jennings Reporting: Pot of Gold" (1996) Producer, Writer
- ABC NEWS: "Peter Jennings Reporting: The American Game" (1997) Producer, Writer
- FRONTLINE: "The Terrorist and the Superpower" (April 1999) Producer, Writer, Correspondent
- FRONTLINE: "Return of the Czar" (2000) Senior Producer
- FRONTLINE: "Drug Wars" (October 2000) Producer, Writer, Correspondent
- FRONTLINE: "Medicating Kids" (10 April 2001) Writer, Producer
- FRONTLINE: "Hunting Bin Laden" (September 2001) Producer, Writer, Correspondent
- FRONTLINE: "Looking for Answers" (October 2001) Producer, Writer, Correspondent
- FRONTLINE: "Saudi Time Bomb?" (November 2001) Producer, Writer, Correspondent
- FRONTLINE: "Dot Con" (January 2002) Producer, Writer, Correspondent
- ABC NEWS: "Divided States of America" (September 2002) Producer, Writer
- FRONTLINE: "In Search of Al Queda" (November 2002) Producer, Writer, Correspondent
- FRONTLINE: "Kim's Nuclear Gamble" (April 2003) Producer, Writer, Correspondent
- FRONTLINE: "Truth, War and Consequences" (October 2003) Producer, Writer, Correspondent
- FRONTLINE: "Beyond Baghdad" (February 2004) Producer, Writer, Correspondent
- FRONTLINE: "The Choice 2004" (October 2004) Producer, Writer
- FRONTLINE: "House of Saud" (February 2005) Co-Producer, Writer
- FRONTLINE: "Private Warriors" (June 2005) Producer, Writer, Correspondent
- FRONTLINE: "The Storm" (November 2005) Producer, Writer, Correspondent
- Columbia University: "Telling the Truth I" (January 2006)
- FRONTLINE: "Return of the Taliban" (June 2006) Producer, Writer, Correspondent
- Columbia University: "Telling the Truth II" (October 2006)
- FRONTLINE: "Gangs of Iraq" (April 2007) Producer, Writer, Correspondent
- Columbia University: "Telling the Truth III" (January 2008)
- FRONTLINE World:"Living on the Edge" (June 2008) Producer, Writer, Correspondent
- FRONTLINE: "Heat" (21 October 2008) Producer, Writer, Correspondent
- FRONTLINE: "The War Briefing" (October 2008)
- FRONTLINE: "The Madoff Affair" (May 2009) Producer, Writer, Correspondent
- FRONTLINE: "Obama's War" (October 2009) Producer, Writer, Correspondent
- FRONTLINE: "The Quake" (March 2010) Producer, Writer, Correspondent
- FRONTLINE: "College Inc." (May 2010) Producer, Writer, Correspondent
- FRONTLINE: "The Spill" (October 2010) Producer, Writer, Correspondent
- FRONTLINE: "The Spy Who Quit" (January 2011) Producer, Writer, Correspondent
- FRONTLINE: "The Private Life of Bradley Manning" (May 2011) Producer, Writer, Correspondent
- FRONTLINE: "WikiSecrets" (May 2011) Producer, Writer, Correspondent
- FRONTLINE: "Educating Sgt. Pantzke" (June 2011) Producer, Writer, Correspondent
- FRONTLINE: "The Interrogator" (September 2011) Producer, Writer, Correspondent
- FRONTLINE: "The Regime" (8 November 2011) Senior Producer
- FRONTLINE: "Cell Tower Deaths" (May 2012) Senior Producer, Correspondent
- FRONTLINE: "Money, Power and Wall Street" (April 2012) Producer, Writer, Correspondent
- FRONTLINE: "Six Billion Dollar Bet" (June 2012) Producer, Reporter
- FRONTLINE: "The Untouchables" (January 2013) Producer, Writer, Correspondent
- FRONTLINE: "The Retirement Gamble" (23 April 2013) Writer, Correspondent
- FRONTLINE: "Obama at War" (26 May 2013) Producer, Writer, Correspondent
- FRONTLINE: "To Catch a Trader" (7 January 2014) Writer, Correspondent
- FRONTLINE: "The Rise of ISIS" (28 October 2014) Producer, Writer, Correspondent
- FRONTLINE: "Life in Baghdad" (12 March 2015) Producer, Writer, Correspondent
- FRONTLINE: "Inside Assad's Syria" (October 2015) Producer, Writer, Correspondent
- FRONTLINE: "Confronting ISIS" (11 October 2016) Producer, Writer, Correspondent
- . FRONTLINE: "Inside Yemen" (18 October 2017) Correspondent
- FRONTLINE: "Bitter Rivals: Iran and Saudi Arabia" (20 & 27 February 2018) Producer, Writer, Correspondent
- FRONTLINE: "Separated: Children at the Border" (31 July 2018) Writer, Correspondent
- FRONTLINE: "The Pensión Gamble" (23 October 2018) Writer, Correspondent
- FRONTLINE: "The Crown Prince of Saudi Arabia" (1 October 2019) Producer, Writer, Correspondent
- FRONTLINE: "Targeting El Paso" (7 January 2020) Correspondent
- FRONTLINE: "The Virus" (16 June 2020) Producer, Director, Writer, Correspondent

== Awards and honors ==
Cf. RainMedia Inc. listing.

=== Emmy ===
- Winner - Outstanding Background/Analysis of a Single Current Story - "Guatemala" (1982)
- Winner - Outstanding Background/Analysis of a Single Current Story - "Drug Wars" (2000)
- Winner - Outstanding Continuing Coverage of a News Story - "The Storm" (2005)
- Winner - Outstanding Documentary on a Business Topic - "The Madoff Affair" (2009)
- Winner - Outstanding Coverage of a News Story - "Money, Power and Wall Street" (2013)
- Winner - Outstanding Business and Economic Reporting - "Money, Power and Wall Street" (2012)
- Winner - Outstanding Documentary - "United States of Secrets" (2015)
- Winner - Outstanding Coverage of A Current News Story - "United States of Secrets" (2015)

=== Writers Guild of America ===
- Winner - Outstanding Script: Television Documentary – Current Events - "Truth War and Consequences" (2003)
- Winner - Outstanding Script: Television Documentary – Current Events - "Return of the Taliban" (2008)
- Winner - Outstanding Script: Television Documentary – Current Events - "The Madoff Affair" (2009)
- Winner - Outstanding Script: Television Documentary – Other Than Current Events - "WikiSecrets" (2012)
- Winner - Outstanding Script: Television News – Regularly Scheduled, Bulletin or Breaking News - "Educating Sergeant Pantzke" (2012)
- Winner - Outstanding Script: Television Documentary – Current Events - "Money Power and Wall Street" (2013)
- Winner - Outstanding Script: Television Documentary – Current Events - "Egypt In Crisis" (2014)
- Winner - Outstanding Script: Television Documentary – Current Events - Confronting ISIS (2018)

=== The George Foster Peabody Award ===
- George Foster Peabody Award FRONTLINE - "Crisis in Central America" 1985
- George Foster Peabody Award FRONTLINE - "Drug Wars" 2000
- George Foster Peabody Award FRONTLINE - "The Madoff Affair" 2009
- George Foster Peabody Award FRONTLINE - "The United States of Secrets" 2014
- George Foster Peabody Award FRONTLINE - "Confronting ISIS" 2016
- George Foster Peabody Award FRONTLINE - "Separated: Children at the Border" 2019

=== Alfred I. duPont-Columbia Award ===
==== Gold Baton ====
- "Inside Gorbachev's USSR" (1990)
- "Hunting bin Laden" (2002)
- "Looking for Answers" (2002)
- "Saudi Time Bomb?" (2002)
- "Bitter Rivals: Iran and Saudi Arabia" (2019)

==== Silver Baton ====
- "Truth War and Consequences" - (2003)
- "The United States of Secrets" (2015)

=== George Polk Award ===
- George Polk Award for Network Television Reporting - CBS Reports: "Guatemala", 1983
- George Polk Award for International Television Reporting - FRONTLINE: "Who's Running This War", 1986
- George Polk Award for Documentary Television Reporting - WGBH: "Inside Gorbachev's USSR" 1990
- George Polk Award for Documentary Television Reporting - FRONTLINE: "Money, Power and Wall Street", 2012

=== The Overseas Press Club Awards ===
- Whitman Bassow Award for Best Reporting in Any Medium on International Environmental Issues - "Heat" (2008)
- Edward R. Murrow Award for Best Television Interpretation or Documentary on International Affairs - "Obama's War" (2009)

=== Prix Italia Award ===
- Documentary of the Year FRONTLINE - "The Bombing of West Philly" - 1987

=== Nancy Dickerson Whitehead Award for Excellence in Reporting on Drug and Alcohol Problems ===
- "Drug Wars", 2001

=== Society of Environmental Journalists' Award ===
- Kevin Carmody Award for Outstanding In-depth Reporting, "The Spill", 2011

=== Career honors ===
- Selected Recipient for the Top 100 Journalism Works of the Decade awarded by New York University (2000–2010) for "Truth, War and Consequences"
- The Edward Weintal Special Citation in recognition of a career of distinguished reporting on foreign policy and diplomacy by the Institute for the Study of Diplomacy at Georgetown University. Awarded to Martin Smith 2007.
- John Chancellor Award for Excellence in Journalism Columbia University Awarded to Martin Smith 2014
