= Raney Aronson-Rath =

American journalist

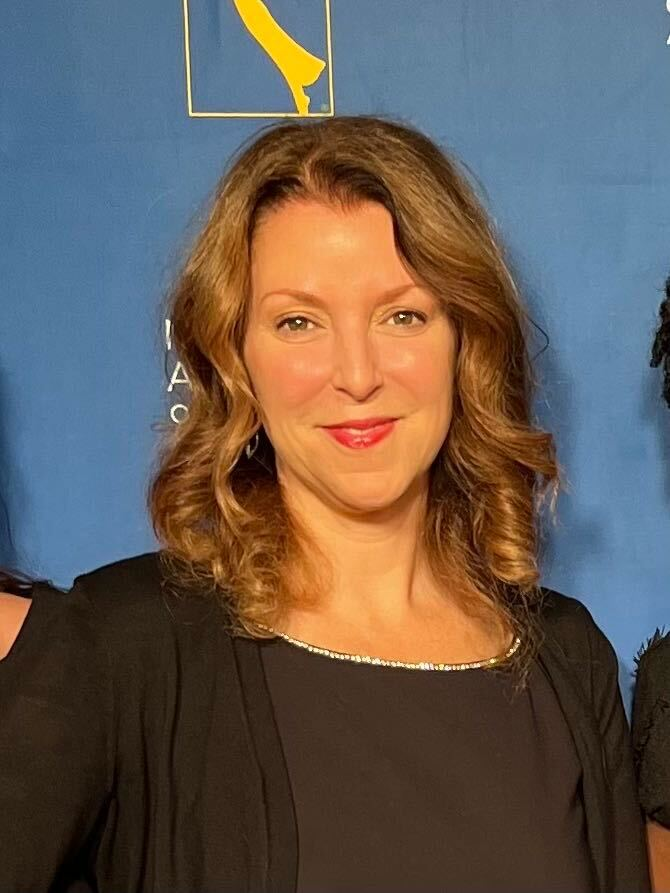
- Raney Aronson-Rath at the News & Documentary Emmys in New York, NY. September 2022.
- Education: University of Wisconsin (B A., 1992); Columbia University Graduate School of Journalism (M.A.)
- Occupation: Filmmaker
- Title: Executive Producer, Frontline
- Spouse: Arun Rath

Raney Aronson-Rath produces Frontline, PBS's flagship investigative journalism series. She has been internationally recognized for her work to expand the PBS series' original investigative journalism and directs the editorial development and execution of the series. Aronson-Rath joined Frontline in 2007 as a senior producer. She was named deputy executive producer by David Fanning, the series’ founder, in 2012, and then became executive producer in 2015.

== Education ==
Aronson-Rath earned a bachelor's degree in South Asian studies and history from the University of Wisconsin. She received her master's from the Columbia University Graduate School of Journalism.

== Career ==
Early in her professional life, Aronson-Rath worked in Taipei, Taiwan, for a small, English-language daily newspaper, The China Post, where she decided to commit to a career in journalism. Later, Aronson-Rath developed and managed more than a dozen journalistic partnerships with news outlets, including ProPublica, Marketplace, PBS NewsHour, The New York Times, CBC Television, and Univision.

Moving to TV news production, Aronson-Rath worked on award-winning series at ABC News, The Wall Street Journal, and MSNBC. She also produced, directed, and wrote several award-winning Frontline films, including News War, The Last Abortion Clinic, and The Jesus Factor.

Aronson-Rath officially joined Frontline in 2007. In 2012, she was named Deputy Editor of Frontline by David Fanning, and Executive Producer in 2015, the position she holds today. She has earned new funding to expand Frontline’s investigative capacity, including the launch of a YouTube channel with original content, a commitment to interactive projects, as well as a film initiative focused on accountability for institutions and public officials called the Transparency Project.

Aronson-Rath currently serves on the Knight Commission on Trust, Media, and Democracy, the Board of Visitors for Columbia University’s Journalism school, and the advisory board of Columbia Global Reports.

She has received numerous accolades for producing the documentary feature film 20 Days in Mariupol, which premiered at the 2023 Sundance Film Festival and won the Best Documentary Feature Award at the 96th Academy Awards. At Sundance, the film won the Sundance World Cinema Documentary Competition. It was also selected as the Ukrainian submission for the Best International Feature Film Oscar, but was not ultimately nominated in this category.

== Awards and honors ==
Aronson-Rath was a 2014-2015 Fellow at the MIT Open Doc Lab. Aronson-Rath has been a speaker at the Skoll World Forum, the Aspens Ideas Summit, The National Scholastic Press Association's High School Journalism Convention, the Columbia University Graduate School of Journalism, and The Power of Narrative Journalism Conference.

Since 2015, Frontline has won many accolades under her direction, including the Academy Award for Best Documentary Feature Film, The Alfred I. duPont–Columbia University Award, IRE Awards, The George Foster Peabody Award, Peabody-Facebook Futures of Media Award, the National Academy of Television Arts and Sciences Emmy Award, the Robert F. Kennedy Journalism Award, the Overseas Press Club Awards, The Scripps Howard Award, and Writer's Guild Awards, and the 2019 dupont-Columbia Gold Baton award, among others.

She was elected a Fellow of the American Academy of Arts and Sciences in 2024.

=== Academy Awards ===
Year	Category	Work	Result	Ref.
2024	Best Documentary Feature Film	20 Days in Mariupol	Won	

=== Emmy Awards ===
Year	Category	Work	Result	Ref.
News & Documentary Emmy Awards
2009	Outstanding Investigative Journalism - Long Form	Frontline (for ep. "Rules of Engagement")	Nominated	
2010	Outstanding Continuing Coverage of a News Story - Long Form	Frontline (for ep. "A Death in Tehran")	Won	
2010	Outstanding Investigative Journalism - Long Form	Frontline (for ep. "The Warning")	Won	
2011	Outstanding Business and Economic Reporting - Long Form	Frontline (for ep. "The Spill")	Nominated	
2011	Outstanding Informational Programming - Long Form	Frontline (for ep. "The Confessions")	Nominated	
2011	Outstanding Investigative Journalism - Long Form	Frontline (for ep. "Law & Disorder")	Nominated	
2011	Outstanding Continuing Coverage of a News Story - Long Form	Frontline (for ep. "The Wounded Platoon")	Nominated	
2011	Outstanding Continuing Coverage of a News Story - Long Form	Frontline (for ep. "The Quake")	Nominated	
2012	Outstanding Interview	Frontline (for ep. "The Spy Who Quit")	Nominated	
2012	Outstanding Interview	Frontline (for ep. "The Interrogator")	Nominated	
2012	Outstanding Investigative Journalism - Long Form	Frontline (for ep. "The Anthrax Files")	Nominated	
2012	Outstanding Investigative Journalism - Long Form	Frontline (for ep. "A Perfect Terrorist")	Nominated	
2012	Outstanding Investigative Journalism in a News Magazine	Frontline (for ep. "The Child Cases")	Nominated	
2012	Outstanding Continuing Coverage of a News Story - Long Form	Frontline (for ep. "Wikisecrets")	Nominated	
2012	Outstanding Coverage of a Breaking News Story in a News Magazine	Frontline (for ep. "Syria Undercover") (Tied)	Won	
2012	Outstanding Coverage of a Breaking News Story in a News Magazine	Frontline (for ep. "Revolution in Cairo") (Tied)	Won	
2013	Outstanding Informational Programming - Long Form	Frontline (for ep. "The Suicide Plan")	Nominated	
2013	Outstanding Informational Programming - Long Form	Frontline (for ep. "The Suicide Plan")	Nominated	
2013	Outstanding Informational Programming - Long Form	Frontline (for ep. "The Interrupters")	Won	
2013	Outstanding Investigative Journalism - Long Form	Frontline (for ep. "Dollars and Dentists")	Nominated	
2013	Outstanding Investigative Journalism - Long Form	Frontline (for ep. "Big Sky, Big Money")	Won	
2013	Outstanding Continuing Coverage of a News Story - Long Form	Frontline (for ep. "Inside Japan's Nuclear Meltdown")	Won	
2013	Outstanding Continuing Coverage of a News Story - Long Form	Frontline (for ep. "Poor Kids")	Nominated	
2013	Outstanding Continuing Coverage of a News Story - Long Form	Frontline (for ep. "Climate of Doubt")	Nominated	
2013	Outstanding Business and Economic Reporting in a News Magazine	Frontline (for ep. "Cell Tower Deaths")	Nominated	
2013	Outstanding Business and Economic Reporting in a News Magazine	Frontline (for ep. "Six Billion Dollar Bet")	Nominated	
2013	Outstanding Investigative Journalism in a News Magazine	Frontline (for ep. "Opium Brides")	Won	
2013	Outstanding Feature Story in a News Magazine	Frontline (for ep. "Opium Brides")	Nominated	
2013	Outstanding Business and Economic Reporting - Long Form	Frontline (for ep. "Money, Power and Wall Street")	Won	
2013	Outstanding Continuing Coverage of a News Story in a News Magazine	Frontline (for ep. "Al Qaeda in Yemen")	Nominated	
2013	Outstanding Continuing Coverage of a News Story in a News Magazine	Frontline (for ep. "The Regime Responds")	Nominated	
2013	Outstanding Coverage of a Breaking News Story in a News Magazine	Frontline (for ep. The Battle for Syria")	Won	
2014	Outstanding Business and Economic Reporting - Long Form	Frontline (for ep. "The Retirement Gamble")	Won	
2014	Outstanding Coverage of a Current News Story - Long Form	Frontline (for ep. "Egypt in Crisis")	Nominated	
2014	Outstanding Coverage of a Current News Story - Long Form	Frontline (for ep. "Syria Behind the Lines")	Won	
2014	Outstanding Investigative Journalism - Long Form	Frontline (for ep. "League of Denial: The NFL's Concussion Crisis")	Nominated	
2014	Outstanding Investigative Journalism - Long Form	Frontline (for ep. "A Death in St. Augustine")	Nominated	
2014	Outstanding Investigative Journalism - Long Form	Frontline (for ep. "Rape in the Fields")	Nominated	
2014	Outstanding Informational Programming - Long Form	Frontline (for ep. "Outlawed in Pakistan")	Nominated	
2014	Outstanding Business and Economic Reporting - Long Form	Frontline (for ep. "The Untouchables")	Nominated	
2015	Outstanding Documentary	Frontline (for ep. "United States of Secrets")	Won	
2015	Outstanding Business and Economic Reporting - Long Form	Frontline (for ep. "To Catch a Trader")	Nominated	
2015	Outstanding Investigative Journalism - Long Form	Frontline (for ep. "Firestone and the Warlord")	Won	
2015	Outstanding Coverage of a Current News Story - Long Form	Frontline (for ep. "United States of Secrets: Part 1 & 2")	Won	
2015	Outstanding Coverage of a Current News Story - Long Form	Frontline (for ep. "The Rise of ISIS")	Nominated	
2015	Outstanding Investigative Journalism in a News Magazine	Frontline (for ep. "Hunting Boko Haram")	Won	
2015	Outstanding Coverage of a Breaking News Story in a News Magazine	Frontline (for ep. "The Battle for Ukraine")	Won	
2015	Outstanding Coverage of a Breaking News Story in a News Magazine	Frontline (for ep. "Ebola Outbreak")	Nominated	
2016	Outstanding New Approaches - Current News Coverage	Frontline	Nominated	
2016	Outstanding Documentary	Frontline (for ep. "Growing Up Trans")	Nominated	
2016	Outstanding Report in a News Magazine	Frontline (for ep. "ISIS in Afghanistan")	Nominated	
2016	Outstanding Continuing Coverage of a News Story in a News Magazine	Frontline (for ep. "ISIS in Afghanistan")	Won	
2016	Outstanding Investigative Journalism - Long Form	Frontline (for ep. "Terror in Little Saigon")	Nominated	
2016	Outstanding Investigative Journalism - Long Form	Frontline (for ep. "Rape on the Night Shift")	Nominated	
2016	Outstanding Investigative Journalism - Long Form	Frontline (for ep. "My Brother's Bomber")	Won	
2016	Outstanding Informational Programming - Long Form	Frontline (for ep. "Gunned Down: The Power of the NRA")	Won	
2016	Outstanding Informational Programming - Long Form	Frontline (for ep. "Being Mortal")	Nominated	
2016	Outstanding Continuing Coverage of a News Story in a News Magazine	Frontline (for ep. "Secrets, Politics and Torture")	Nominated	
2016	Outstanding Continuing Coverage of a News Story in a News Magazine	Frontline (for ep. "Inside Assad's Syria")	Nominated	
2016	Outstanding Continuing Coverage of a News Story in a News Magazine	Frontline (for ep. "Outbreak")	Won	
2017	Outstanding Documentary	Frontline (for ep. "Children of Syria")	Nominated	
2017	Outstanding Current Affairs Documentary	Frontline (for ep. "Children of Syria")	Won	
2017	Outstanding Current Affairs Documentary	Frontline (for ep. "Confronting ISIS")	Nominated	
2017	Outstanding Story in a Newsmagazine	Frontline (for ep. "Yemen Under Siege")	Won	
2017	Outstanding Continuing Coverage of a News Story in a News Magazine	Frontline (for ep. "Yemen Under Siege")	Won	
2017	Outstanding Politics and Government Documenta	Frontline (for ep. "The Choice 2016")	Won	
2017	Outstanding Investigative Documentary	Frontline (for ep. "The Secret History of ISIS")	Nominated	
2017	Outstanding Social Issue Documentary	Frontline (for ep. "Chasing Heroin")	Nominated	
2017	Outstanding Social Issue Documentary	Policing the Police	Nominated	
2017	Outstanding Feature Story in a News Magazine	A Subprime Education/The Education of Omarina	Nominated	
2017	Outstanding Business and Economic Documentary	The Fantasy Sports Gamble	Nominated	
2018	Outstanding Story in a Newsmagazine	Frontline (for ep. "Inside Yemen")	Nominated	
2018	Outstanding Story in a Newsmagazine	Frontline (for ep. "Battle for Iraq")	Nominated	
2018	Outstanding Documentary	Frontline (for ep. "Putin's Revenge")	Nominated	
2018	Outstanding Short Documentary	Frontline (for ep. "Mosul")	Nominated	
2018	Outstanding Business and Economic Documentary	Frontline (for ep. "Abacus: Small Enough to Jail")	Won	
2018	Outstanding Investigative Documentary	Frontline (for ep. "Iraq Uncovered")	Nominated	
2018	Outstanding Investigative Documentary	Frontline (for ep. "War on the EPA")	Nominated	
2018	Outstanding Politics and Government Documentary	Frontline (for ep. "Abacus: Small Enough to Jail")	Nominated	
2018	Outstanding Continuing Coverage of a News Story in a News Magazine	Frontline (for ep. "Bannon's War")	Nominated	
2019	Outstanding Politics and Government Documentary	Frontline (for ep. "Separated: Children at the Border")	Nominated	
2019	Outstanding Business and Economic Documentary	Frontline (for ep. "The Pension Gamble")	Nominated	
2019	Outstanding Investigative Documentary	Frontline (for ep. Documenting Hate")	Won	
2019	Outstanding Investigative Documentary	Frontline (for ep."UN Sex Abuse Scandal")	Nominated	
2019	Outstanding Investigative Documentary	Frontline (for ep. "Myanmar's Killing Fields")	Nominated	
2019	Outstanding Current Affairs Documentary	Frontline (for ep. "The Facebook Dilemma")	Nominated	
2019	Outstanding Documentary	Frontline (for ep. "Exodus: The Journey Continues")	Nominated	
2020	Outstanding Historical Documentary	Frontline	Nominated	
2021	Outstanding Business and Economic Reporting - Long Form	Amazon Empire: The Rise and Reign of Jeff Bezos	Won	
2021	Outstanding Investigative Documentary	Return from ISIS	Nominated	
2022	Outstanding Business, Consumer or Economic Coverage	Frontline (for ep. "Boeing's Fatal Flaw")	Won	
2022	Outstanding Business and Economic Documentary	Frontline (for ep. "tt14875370")	Nominated	
2024	Best Documentary	Frontline	Nominated	
2024	Outstanding Business and Economic Documentary	Frontline (for ep. "#42.4")	Nominated	

=== Other awards and nominations ===
Award	Year	Category	Work(s)	Result	Ref.
Peabody Awards	2019	Documentary Honor	For Sama	Won	
Peabody Awards	2023	Documentary Honor	20 Days in Mariupol	Won	
Peabody Awards	2023	News Honor	Clarence and Ginni Thomas: Politics, Power and the Supreme Court	Won	
Peabody Awards	2023	Public Service Honor	America and the Taliban	Won	
Peabody Awards	2024	Public Service Honor	Frontline	Won	
Writers Guild of America Awards	2006	Outstanding Television Documentary Script – Current Events	Frontline (for ep. "The Soldier's Heart")	Nominated	
Writers Guild of America Awards	2006	Outstanding Television Documentary Script – Current Events	Frontline (for ep. "News War Part 1: Secrets Sources and Spin")	Nominated	
