= H. Russell Smith =

American business executive

- Born: 15 August 1914; Clark County, Ohio
- Died: 7 September 2014 (aged 100)

Howard Russell Smith (August 15, 1914 – September 7, 2014) was an American business executive.

== Early life ==
Howard Russell Smith was born August 15, 1914 in Clark County, Ohio and lived on his families citrus farm in El Cajon Valley near El Cajon, California.

== Education ==
He attended Pomona College in Claremont, California.

== Career ==
In 1946, R. Stanton Avery, his college friend, invited Smith to join the Avery Adhesive Label Co. as one-third owner, director, vice president and general manager.

Smith was president of the sticker manufacturer Avery Dennison from 1956 to 1975. He remained involved with the company as chair of its board of trustees and later its executive committee until his retirement in 1995.

== Personal life ==
Smith was a chairman of the board of trustees for 18 years as well as serving as the chairman of the boards of the Los Angeles Philharmonic Assn., Children’s Hospital Los Angeles and public television station KCET (Channel 28).

Martin Elder Smith is his nephew.
