= Lowell Bergman =

American journalist (born 1945)

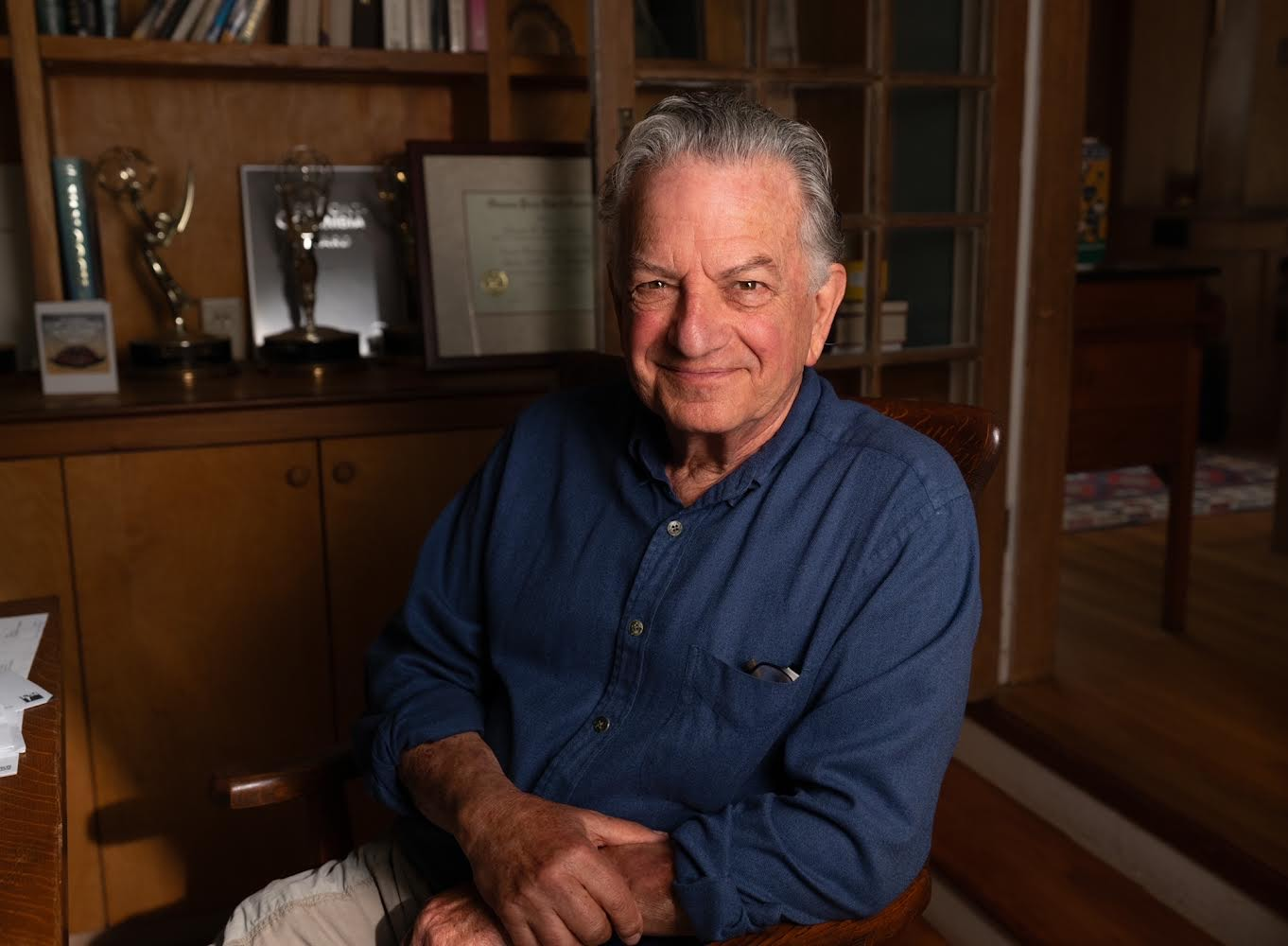
- Born: July 24, 1945 (age 81); New York City, New York, U.S.
- Education: University of Wisconsin, Madison (BA); University of California, San Diego
- Occupations: Journalist, television and documentary film producer, professor
- Known for: Reporting (earning a Pulitzer, multiple Emmys, and numerous other awards)
- Spouse: Sharon Tiller
- Website: University website

Lowell Bergman (born July 24, 1945) is an American journalist, television producer, and professor of journalism. Bergman was a producer, reporter, and director of investigative reporting at ABC News. Later a producer for CBS’s 60 Minutes, he left that network in 1999 as the senior producer of investigations for CBS News. He founded the investigative reporting program at the Graduate School of Journalism at UC Berkeley, where he taught for 28 years. He was also a producer and correspondent for the PBS documentary series Frontline. Bergman retired from his teaching position in 2019.

Bergman's investigation into the tobacco industry was depicted in Michael Mann’s The Insider, which was nominated for seven Academy Awards and featured Al Pacino as Bergman. From 1999 to 2008, Bergman was an investigative correspondent for The New York Times. He also formed a partnership between the Times and Frontline, leading to award-winning investigative projects across broadcast, print, and web platforms. Bergman was awarded the Pulitzer Prize for Public Service in 2004 for "A Dangerous Business," a New York Times investigation into worker safety and environmental law violations in the cast-iron sewer and water pipe industry.

Through the non-profit production company Investigative Studios, Bergman has continued to work on documentaries and documentary series, serving as co-executive producer with Brian Knappenberger on Netflix’s The Trials of Gabriel Fernandez and as executive producer and reporter on Agents of Chaos, a co-production with Alex Gibney’s Jigsaw Productions.

== Early life and career ==
Bergman grew up in Brooklyn and Queens and graduated from New Rochelle High School in 1963. He graduated with honors in sociology and history from the University of Wisconsin–Madison and was a graduate fellow in philosophy at the University of California, San Diego, where he studied under Herbert Marcuse. In 1968, he co-founded the San Diego Free Press (later renamed the San Diego Street Journal), an alternative newspaper, with several fellow students. He and others instigated the probe that led to the downfall of the San Diego financial empire of C. Arnholt Smith, president and chief executive officer of U.S. National Bank in San Diego. Bergman went on to contribute to Ramparts, The San Francisco Examiner, Rolling Stone, and The New York Times.

In 1975, Bergman became an associate editor at Rolling Stone magazine. He was part of the reporting team that continued the work of Arizona Republic reporter Don Bolles, who was assassinated in 1976 while investigating organized crime. After Rolling Stone moved to New York in 1977, Bergman cofounded the Center for Investigative Reporting.

== Television career ==
From 1978 until 1983, Bergman was a producer and reporter at ABC News, where he was one of the original producers of 20/20. In 1983, he joined CBS News as a producer for the weekly newsmagazine 60 Minutes, where he worked with its lead correspondent, Mike Wallace. Over 14 years, he produced more than 50 stories, including exposes of organized crime, international arms dealing, and international drug trafficking in Venezuela involving the CIA. His stories about California’s prison system revealed the conditions of solitary confinement and the staging of “gladiator” matches by correctional officers. He also produced the first U.S. television interviews with Lebanon’s Hezbollah leadership in 1993.

Bergman's investigation of the tobacco industry for 60 Minutes was featured in the 1999 feature film The Insider, in which Bergman was played by Al Pacino.

== Reporting across multiple platforms ==
Bergman established an alliance between The New York Times and Frontline after leaving network news in the late 1990s. This collaboration resulted in a series of stories, including coverage of California’s energy crisis, the country’s war on drugs, the rise of Islamic fundamentalism, the roots of 9/11, the credit card and gold industries, the post-9/11 hunt for “sleeper cells” in America, and recent Al Qaeda’s attacks in Europe. The collaboration also produced a number of award-winning projects with print, broadcast, and online components. Websites prepared in large part by Bergman's students accompanied many of these projects, including “Secret History of the Credit Card”, “Al Qaeda's New Front”, “The Enemy Within”, “The Real CSI,” and “News War.” “News War,” which examined the challenges facing the mainstream news media, drew on more than 80 interviews with key figures and behind-the-scenes access to news organizations.

Collaborating with other New York Times reporters, Bergman helped produce a series of articles detailing the financial arrangements between Vice President Dick Cheney and Halliburton, both before and after Cheney's retirement as chief executive officer of that firm.

== Awards and honors ==
Bergman has received honors for both print and broadcasting reporting. The New York Times won the 2004 Pulitzer Prize for Public Service for “the work of David Barstow and Lowell Bergman that relentlessly examined death and injury among American workers and exposed employers who break basic safety rules.” The series, "A Dangerous Business", detailed a record of worker safety violations and environmental law violations in the iron sewer and water pipe industry.

Bergman is the recipient of numerous Emmys and other honors, including six Alfred I. duPont-Columbia University Silver and Golden awards, three Peabodys, a Writers Guild Award, the National Press Club's Consumer Journalism Award for Television on the credit card industry, a George Polk Award, a Sidney Hillman award for labor reporting, and the James Madison Freedom of Information Award for Career Achievement from the Society of Professional Journalists.

== Interviews ==
- "Smoke In The Eye: a Talk With Lowell Bergman", PBS Frontline (1999). "There's a major difference between All The President's Men and The Insider", Lowell Bergman said of the comparison between the 1976 film on Watergate and Hollywood's version of the events depicted in Frontline's report, "Smoke in the Eye". "In All the President's Men, the editors and reporters are heroes. That's not the case here."
- "Long March through the Institution" of Television Journalism; Conversation with Lowell Bergman. Part of the "Conversations with History" series, Institute of International Studies, UC Berkeley with Harry Kreisler, (2001)
- On September 27, 2006, Bergman appeared on The Colbert Report.
- On February 27, 2007, Bergman was interviewed by Terry Gross of WHYY's Fresh Air about the Frontline documentary "News War: Secrets, Spin and the Future of the News." The four-part series, which Bergman co-produced, is about the mainstream news media and the political, legal, and economic forces acting on it. The third installment looks at how the pressure for profits and shifting advertising dollars are affecting the news business.
- On February 27, 2007, Bergman was interviewed by Marketplace's Kai Ryssdal about how the Internet has changed journalism.
- On June 11, 2007, Bergman was interviewed by George Stroumboulopoulos for CBC Television's news magazine, The Hour.
- On January 26, 2009, Bergman discussed Halliburton's record $560 million settlement with the Justice Department and the SEC for violations of the Foreign Corrupt Practices Act with NPR's All Things Considered. Bergman's documentary on bribery in international commerce aired on PBS's Frontline. Frontline/World: The Business of Bribes | PBS April 7, 2009.
