= Hedrick Smith =

American journalist, producer, and author

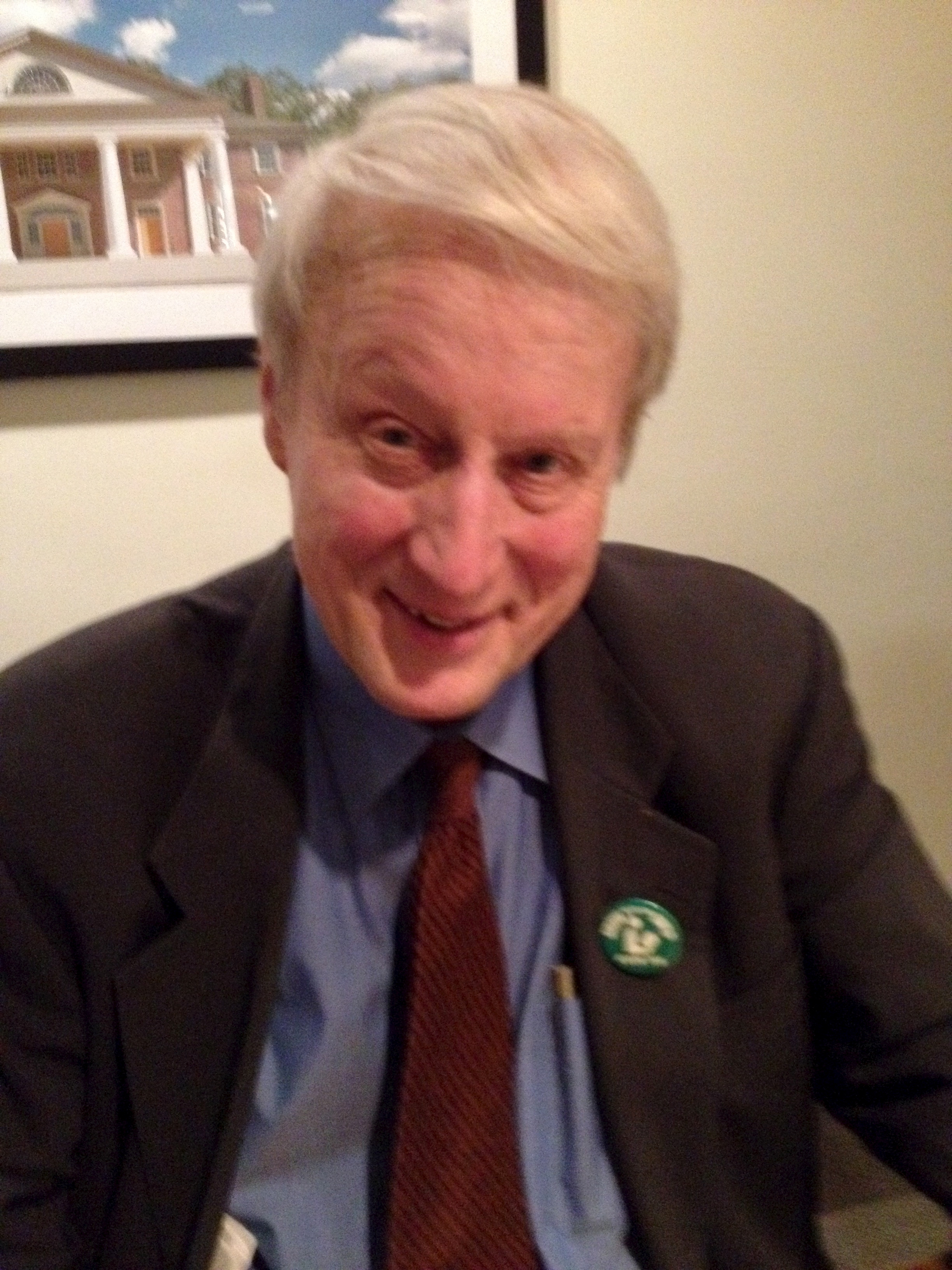
- Born: July 9, 1933 (age 92); Kilmacolm, Scotland
- Education: Williams College; Balliol College, Oxford; Harvard University
- Years active: 1959 - present
- Employer(s): The New York Times (1962-1988); Hedrick Smith Productions (1989-2012)
- Notable work: The Russians, The Power Game: How Washington Works, The Pentagon Papers (co-authored), The New Russians, Rethinking America, Who Stole the American Dream?
- Awards: Pulitzer Prize for International Reporting; Pulitzer Prize for Public Service; 2x Emmy award winner Alfred I. duPont-Columbia University Award (1991)
- Honours: Nieman Fellow at Harvard (1969-1970); Fulbright Scholar at Oxford University (1955-56)
- Website: ReclaimTheAmericanDream.org

Hedrick Smith is a Pulitzer Prize-winning former New York Times reporter and Emmy award-winning producer and correspondent. After serving 26 years with The New York Times from 1962 to 1988 as correspondent, editor and bureau chief in both Moscow and Washington, Smith moved into television in 1989, reporting and producing more than 50 hours of long-form documentaries for PBS over the next 25 years on topics from the inside story of the terrorists who mounted the 9/11 attacks and Gorbachev's perestroika to Wall Street, Walmart and The Democracy Rebellion of grassroots citizen reform movements. Smith has authored five best-selling books including The Russians, The Power Game: How Washington Works, and Who Stole the American Dream?, and co-authored several other books, including The Pentagon Papers and Reagan: The Man, the President. Smith is currently Executive Editor of the website ReclaimTheAmericanDream.org and the YouTube channel The People vs. The Politicians.

== Early life and education ==
Smith was born on July 9, 1933, in Kilmacolm, Scotland. He was educated at The Choate School (now Choate Rosemary Hall) in Wallingford, Connecticut, and at Williams College, where he earned a B.A. in American history and literature in 1955. From 1955 to 1956, Smith did graduate work in PPE (Politics, Philosophy, and Economics) as a Fulbright Scholar at Oxford University. He served in the U.S. Air Force from 1956 to 1959. In 1969, he won a Nieman Fellowship to study at Harvard University, concentrating in Russian studies.

== Newspaper career ==
Smith's career in print journalism began in the 1950s, with summer jobs as a cub reporter for The Greenville (S.C.) News. After college and serving three years in the U.S. Air Force, Smith joined United Press International in 1959, serving in bureaus in Memphis, Nashville, and Atlanta. In the early 1960s, Smith began his long tenure with The New York Times covering Martin Luther King Jr., John Lewis, and the civil rights struggle, including hot spots such as Birmingham, the desegregation of Ole Miss, and the March on Washington.

As a foreign correspondent, Smith reported on the Vietnam War in Saigon (1963–64), on the Middle East region based in Cairo (1964–66), and on the Cold War from both Washington (1967–70) and Moscow (1971–74). Smith won the Pulitzer Prize for International Reporting from Russia and Eastern Europe in 1974.

In 1971, Smith and fellow New York Times journalist Neil Sheehan were members of the Pulitzer Prize-winning team that produced the Pentagon Papers series, based on Defense Secretary Robert McNamara's top secret history of the Vietnam War under four U.S. presidents. Prior to publishing, Smith and Sheehan spent over three months studying 7,000 pages of classified documents and history, hiding from the government in New York's 6th Avenue Hilton hotel under an assumed name.

Recalling his work with Sheehan on the Pentagon Papers, Smith said: "What Neil Sheehan did was bring to the public a reckoning with the truth.. It was a real pleasure and real honor for me to have had the fun and the accomplishment of sharing the experience with Neil Sheehan."

In 1975, Smith became deputy national editor of the Times and then moved on to serve as Washington Bureau Chief (1976–79) and Chief Washington Correspondent (1979–88). During his Washington tours he covered five American presidents and their administrations.

== Books ==
Smith's book The Russians (1975), based on his years as the New York Times Moscow Bureau Chief from 1971 to 1974, was a No. 1 American best-seller. It has been translated into 16 languages and widely used in university courses. His next book, The Power Game: How Washington Works (1988), was another major best-seller. In a video tour of the White House, C-SPAN filmed the book sitting on President Clinton's bedside table. It became a political bible for many newly elected members of Congress and their staff.

Nearly three decades after his first Moscow tour, Smith returned to Russia to witness the crumbling of Soviet Communism and the breakup of the old Soviet Union. In The New Russians (1990), Smith gave a first-hand account of president Mikhail Gorbachev's dramatic political and economic reforms known as perestroika.

Over the past 25 years, Smith has focused on the American domestic scene, producing two books - Rethinking America (1995) and Who Stole the American Dream? (2012) that provide extended reporting and analysis on the causes of sharply rising economic inequality in the United States and its increasingly dysfunctional political system as well as efforts to restore greater fairness, transparency and inclusion in both the American economy and American politics.

== Television productions ==
In 1989–90, Smith converted his best-selling book, The Power Game, into a four-hour documentary series giving his inside analysis of how power politics work - or don't work - in Washington and launched a 25-year television production career that generated 26 prime-time specials and mini-series for PBS.

Smith followed up with a pioneering PBS four-hour documentary series Inside Gorbachev's USSR, exploiting his knowledge of Russia history and his ability to conduct TV interviews in Russian to get American television's first broad inside look at Gorbachev's perestroika reform campaign. That series won the prestigious Columbia - Dupont Gold Baton, or grand prize, for the best public affairs program on U.S. television in 1991. Smith has won all of television's major awards with other PBS programs. He earned national Emmys for The Wall Street Fix (2003) and Can You Afford to Retire? (2006) which he created for PBS Frontline. Two more of his programs won Emmy nominations - Critical Condition (2000), a three-hour examination of the U.S. health care system, and Tax Me If You Can (2004), a one-hour investigation of the tax dodges of corporations and the wealthy. In 2002, Smith shared the prestigious duPont-Columbia Gold Baton for Inside the Terror Network, his in-depth account of the al Qaeda bombers organizing, training and preparing for their attack on the U.S. on September 11, 2001.

Coupled with Frontline investigative exposes like Bigger Than Enron (2002), Is Wal-Mart Good for America? (2004) Spying on the Home Front (2007), and Poisoned Waters (2009), one distinctive feature of Smith's television reporting is his focus not just on examining problems but in Seeking Solutions (1999), his mini-series on teen violence and hate crime, used by the Justice Department and Congressional committees; Making Schools Work (2005), a two-hour special on effective educational programs boosting student success; and Surviving the Bottom Line (1998) a four-hour report comparing the fairness of America's economy with Germany, Japan and China.

Those programs earned Smith and his production team public service awards from the Sidney Hillman foundation and from Sigma Delta Chi, the national honor society of journalists.

His most recent PBS documentary The Democracy Rebellion (2020) shows how grass roots citizen movements have challenged entrenched politicians and power brokers to win election law reforms against dark money, gerrymandering or vote suppression and to make America's broken democracy fairer, more open and more inclusive. It is now featured 24/7 on Smith's YouTube channel, "The People vs the Politicians".

Over 25 years, PBS viewers also came to know Hedrick Smith as a regular panelist on Washington Week in Review and as a special correspondent for The NewsHour with Jim Lehrer.

== Awards, honors, and organizations ==
Smith received a Fulbright Scholarship to study Politics, Philosophy, and Economics (PPE) at Oxford University in 1955. In 1969, he won a Nieman Fellowship to study at Harvard University, concentrating in Russian studies.

In 1971, he was a member of the team that won the Pulitzer Prize for its work on the Pentagon Papers. He won the Pulitzer Prize for International Reporting in 1974 for stories from Russia and Eastern Europe.

Smith has also won many television awards. His Frontline shows, The Wall Street Fix and Can You Afford to Retire? won Emmys and two other awards and his Frontline shows, Critical Condition and Tax Me If You Can were nominated. He has won or shared the Columbia-Dupont Gold Baton for the year's best public affairs program on U.S. television twice. He has also won the George Polk, George Peabody and Hillman awards for his excellence in reporting along with two national public service awards.

Smith is a member of Phi Beta Kappa and the Gridiron Club.

== List of PBS productions ==
Smith has produced 24 programs and miniseries, four one-hour PBS specials, 11 Frontline productions, and nine NewsHour segments. His most recent work, the feature-length documentary "The Democracy Rebellion", is featured on his YouTube channel.

PBS programs, specials, and miniseries

- The Power Game: How Washington Works (4 hours, 1989)
- Transition to Power - George HW Bush: Election to Inauguration (1989)
- Inside Gorbachev’s USSR (4 hours, 1990)
  - (Hosted) Soviets (1991)
  - (Hosted) Baltic Requiem (1991)
- Challenge to America (4 hours, 1994)
- Pathways to Success (1995)
- Across the River (1995)
- The People and the Power Game (4 hours, 1996)
- Surviving the Bottom Line (4 hours, 1998)
- Seeking Solutions to Hate Crimes and Prejudice (4 hours, 1999)
- Duke Ellington’s Washington (2000)
- Critical Condition: The State of US Health Care (3 hours, 2000)
- Juggling Work and Family (2001)
- Rediscovering Dave Brubeck (2001)
- Making Schools Work (2 hours, 2005)
- The Democracy Rebellion (2020)

PBS Frontline productions

- After Gorbachev's USSR (1992)
- Guns, Tanks and Gorbachev (1992)
- Dr. Solomon's Dilemma (2000)
- Inside the Terror Network (2002)
- Bigger Than Enron (2002)
- The Wall Street Fix (2003)
- Tax Me If You Can (2004)
- Is Wal-Mart Good for America? (2004)
- Can You Afford to Retire? (2006)
- Spying on the Home Front (2007)
- Poisoned Waters (2009)

PBS NewsHour segments

- Issue of Control - The Greening of the Republican Class of 1994 (1996)
- Surviving the Revolution - How Republicans fared in the Election (1996)
- The Money Trail (3 segments, 1997)
- Surviving the Bottom Line (2 segments, 1998)
- "Grow-Your-Own" Workers (2 segments, 1998)

== In popular culture ==
Mr. Smith appears in episode 17 of the anime series Tiger Mask II, where he is the chief editor of the New York Post.

== Bibliography ==
- The Russians (1975), ISBN 978-0-8129-0521-2
- The Pentagon Papers: The Secret History of the Vietnam War (co-authored with Neil Sheehan, 1971), ISBN 0-552-64917-1
- Reagan: The Man, the President (1980)
- The Power Game: How Washington Works (1987)
- The New Russians (1990)
- The Media and the Gulf War (1992)
- Rethinking America (1995)
- Who Stole the American Dream? (2012)
