= Agents of Chaos (miniseries) =

2020 American documentary miniseries

- Directed by: Alex Gibney; Javier Alberto Botero
- Composers: Ivor Guest & Robert Logan
- Original language: English
- No. of episodes: 2

Production
- Executive producers: Lowell Bergman; Stacey Offman; Richard Perello; Nancy Abraham; Lisa Heller
- Producers: Alex Gibney; Javier Alberto Botero; Kara Elverson
- Editors: Michael J. Palmer; Aleks Gezentsvey; Ben Sozanski
- Production companies: HBO Documentary Films; Jigsaw Productions; Investigative Studios

Original release
- Network: HBO
- Release: September 23 – September 24, 2020

Agents of Chaos is an American documentary miniseries directed by Alex Gibney and Javier Alberto Botero, revolving around alleged Russian interference in the 2016 United States elections. It premiered on September 23, 2020, on HBO.

== Plot ==
It follows Russian interference in the 2016 United States elections. Andrew Weissmann, Andrew McCabe, John Brennan, Carter Page, Felix Sater, Margarita Simonyan, Celeste Wallander and Camille François appear in the series.

== Episodes ==
| No. | Title | Directed by | Original release date | U.S. viewers (millions) |
|---|---|---|---|---|
| 1 | "Part One" | Alex Gibney | September 23, 2020 | N/A |
| 2 | "Part Two" | Javier Alberto Botero | September 24, 2020 | N/A |

== Reception ==
On Rotten Tomatoes, the series holds an approval rating of 80% based on 15 reviews, with an average rating of 7.8/10. On Metacritic, the series has a weighted average score of 79 out of 100, based on 10 critics, indicating "generally favorable" reviews.
