= Michael Kirk =

Documentary filmmaker

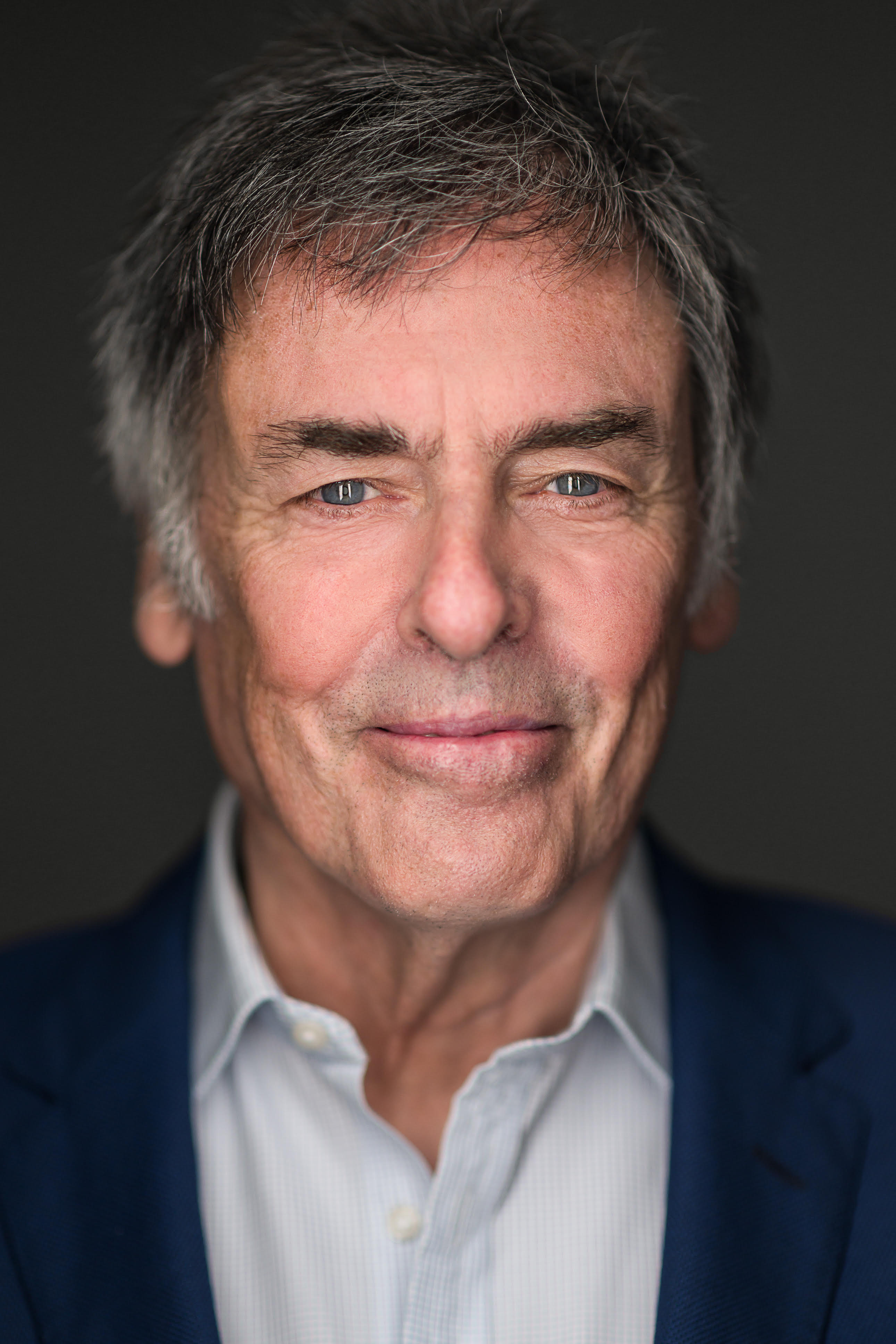
- Born: Denver, Colorado, U.S.
- Occupations: Film director, writer, producer

Michael Kirk is a documentary filmmaker and the original senior producer of Frontline, PBS' flagship documentary series, from its inception in 1983 until the fall of 1987, when he created his own production company: the Kirk Documentary Group. He is a former Nieman Fellow in Journalism at Harvard University and has produced more than 200 national television programs covering salient stories in America's history for just over 4 decades.

Kirk was born in Denver, Colorado and later grew up in Boise, Idaho where he attended Bishop Kelly High School. He received a degree in journalism from the University of Idaho in 1971 and was a Harvard University Nieman Fellow in 1980.

== Early life and education ==
Kirk was born in Denver and later moved to Boise, Idaho, where he attended Bishop Kelly High School.

He received a degree in journalism from the University of Idaho in 1971 and was a Harvard University Nieman Fellow in 1980.

== Career ==
Kirk's history with PBS's FRONTLINE dates back to its inception and debut in 1983. He has since continued to produce a series of films through his own production company, Kirk Documentary Group. Kirk has produced more than 200 national television programs, winning every major award in broadcast journalism, including six Peabody Awards, four duPont-Columbia Awards, two George Polk awards, 17 Emmy Awards, 14 Writers Guild of America Awards, and a Cronkite Award. He has directed and written more than 100 hours of FRONTLINE - including five installments of "The Choice," the acclaimed election-year series profiling the two major-party presidential candidates.

Some of his award-winning documentaries include Clarence and Ginni Thomas: Politics, Power, and the Supreme Court Money, Power and Wall Street, League of Denial: The NFL's Concussion Crisis, United States of Secrets, Gunned Down: The Power of the NRA, The Choice 2016, Trump's Takeover, and Putin's Revenge. He produced films about the 2008 financial crisis, Inside the Meltdown; Bush's War, about the Iraq War under George W. Bush; and The Way the Music Died, about the dire straits of the record industry.

Kirk has made upwards of 20 films on the Obama and Trump presidencies, including Trump's Comeback, The Choice 2024: Harris vs. Trump, The Choice 2020: Trump vs. Biden, Supreme Revenge, Zero Tolerance, Trump's Takeover, Divided States of America, The Choice 2016, United States of Secrets, Putin's Revenge, The Choice 2012, The Warning and many others. Kirk's most recent films-- Democracy on Trial, The Choice 2024: Harris vs. Trump, and Biden's Decision—were the top three most streamed FRONTLINE documentaries in 2024.

== Recognition and awards ==
Kirk was inducted into the University of Idaho Alumni Hall of Fame in 2000 and given an honorary degree in 2013. He is a former Nieman Fellow in Journalism at Harvard University.

Since 1984, Kirk has notably received every major award in broadcast journalism: six Peabody Awards, four duPont-Columbia Awards, two George Polk awards, 17 Emmy Awards, 13 Writers Guild of America Awards. More recently, in 2023 and 2024, Kirk won a Peabody Award and an Emmy Award for Clarence and Ginni Thomas: Politics, Power and the Supreme Court. Kirk's 2019 film Putin's Revenge shared a Gold Baton from the duPont-Columbia Awards. That same year, Kirk and Mike Wiser then won a Writers Guild Award in the Documentary Scripts – Current Events category, for Trump's Takeover. In 2015, 2016, and 2017, Kirk had consecutive Emmy wins for United States of Secrets, Gunned Down: The Power of the NRA, and The Choice 2016.

Michael Kirk's body of work has been widely acknowledged throughout his career. Philip Kennicott described Kirk's documentary style in The Washington Post as "rigorous, even obsessive about getting the chronology straight" and added "if newspapers do the rough draft of history, Kirk does a very smooth and fascinating second draft."

As reported by critic Robert Lloyd in The Los Angeles Times, Kirk's multi-award-winning film, United States of Secrets is "nuanced" and "compelling". Variety's Sonia Saraiya wrote that his four-hour mini-series Divided States of America "may well be the most important piece of journalism about this tumultuous era of identity politics and populist backlash."

== Filmography ==
- The Rise of RFK Jr. (1 October 2025)
- Trump's Comeback (21 January 2025)
- The Choice 2024: Harris vs. Trump (24 September 2024)
- Biden's Decision (6 August 2024)
- Democracy on Trial (30 January 2024)
- McConnell, the GOP & the Court (31 October 2023)
- Putin's Crisis (11 July 2023)
- Clarence and Ginni Thomas: Politics, Power and The Supreme Court (9 May 2023)
- Putin and the Presidents (31 January 2023)
- Lies, Politics and Democracy (6 September 2022)
- Pelosi's Power (22 March 2022)
- Putin's Road To War (15 March 2022)
- America After 9/11 (7 September 2021)
- Trump's American Carnage (26 January 2021)
- President Biden (19 January 2021)
- United States of Conspiracy (12 January 2021)
- The Choice 2020: Trump vs. Biden (22 September 2020)
- United States of Conspiracy (28 July 2020)
- America's Great Divide (Part 1: 13 January 2020 & Part 2: 14 January 2020)
- Zero Tolerance (22 October 2019)
- Supreme Revenge (21 May 2019)
- The Mueller Investigation (22 March 2019)
- Trump's Showdown (2 October 2018)
- McCain (17 April 2018)
- Trump's Takeover (10 April 2018)
- Putin's Revenge (Part 1: 25 October 2017 & Part 2: 1 November 2017)
- Bannon's War (23 May 2017)
- Trump's Road to the White House (24 January 2017)
- Divided States of America Part 1: (17 January 2017 & Part 2: 18 January 2017)
- President Trump (3 January 2017)
- The Choice 2016 (27 September 2016)
- The Secret History of ISIS (17 May 2016)
- Netanyahu at War (5 January 2016)
- Secrets, Politics and Torture (19 May 2015)
- Gunned Down: The Power of the NRA (6 January 2015)
- Losing Iraq (29 July 2014)
- United States of Secrets (13 May 2014)
- League of Denial: The NFL's Concussion Crisis (8 October 2013)
- Cliffhanger (12 February 2013)
- Inside Obama's Presidency (15 January 2013)
- The Choice 2012 (9 October 2012)
- Money, Power & Wall Street (Part 1 & 2: 24 April 2012, Part 3 & 4: 1 May 2012)
- The Anthrax Files (11 October 2011)
- Top Secret America (6 September 2011)
- Revolution in Cairo (22 February 2011)
- Are We Safer? (18 January 2011)
- Obama's Deal (13 April 2010)
- The Warning (13 October 2009)
- Breaking the Bank (16 June 2009)
- Inside the Meltdown (17 February 2009)
- Dreams of Obama (20 January 2009)
- The Choice 2008 (14 October 2008)
- Caring for Your Parents (2 April 2008)
- Bush's War (24 and 25 March 2008)
- Cheney's Law (14 October 2007)
- Endgame (19 June 2007)
- The Lost Year in Iraq (17 October 2006)
- The Dark Side (20 June 2006)
- The Torture Question (18 October 2005)
- Karl Rove the Architect (12 April 2005)
- Rumsfeld's War (26 October 2004)
- The Way the Music Died (27 May 2004)
- From China With Love (15 January 2004)
- Cyber Wars! (24 April 2003)
- The Long Road to War (17 March 2003)
- The War Behind Closed Doors (20 February 2003)
- The Man Who Knew (3 October 2002)
- Did Daddy Do It? (25 April 2002)
- Battle for the Holy Land (4 April 2002)
- Misunderstood Minds (27 March 2002)
- American Porn (7 February 2002)
- Gunning For Saddam (November 8, 2001)
- Target America (4 October 2001)
- LAPD Blues (15 May 2001)
- The Clinton Years (January 16, 2001)
- The Choice 2000 (2 October 2000)
- The War in Europe (22 February 2000)
- Killer at Thurston High (18 January 2000)
- Give War a Chance (1999)
- The Child Terror (1998)
- Secrets of an Independent Counsel (1998)
- Once Upon a Time in Arkansas (1997)
- The Fixers (1997)
- The Navy Blues (1996)
- The Kevorkian Verdict (1996)
- So You Want to Buy A President (1996)
- Waco: The Inside Story (1995)
- Hot Money (1994)
- The Kevorkian File (1994)
- The Trouble with Baseball (1993)
- Clinton Takes Over (1993)
- To the Brink of War (1991)
- Indian Country (1988)
- AIDS: A National Inquiry (1986)
- Poison and the Pentagon (1988)
- Mount St. Helens: Why They Died (1982)
- Boeing vs. the World: The Jet Set (1981)
- Do I Look Like I Want to Die? (1979)
- Backstreets (1978)
- Some of the Presidents' Men (1978)
- Sweet Land of Liberty: the Moscow Pullman Gay Community (1976)
- The Press (1976)
- Teton: Decision and Disaster (1976)
- Kellogg: The Best to You Each Morning (1974)
